= 2020–21 Cheltenham Town F.C. season =

Cheltenham Town
2020–21 season
- Chairman: Andy Wilcox
- Manager: Michael Duff
- Stadium: Whaddon Road
- League Two: 1st (Promoted)
- FA Cup: Fourth round
- EFL Cup: Second round
- EFL Trophy: Second round
- Top goalscorer: League: Alfie May (9); All: Alfie May (13)
| Home colours | Away colours |

The 2020–21 season was Cheltenham Town's 134th season in their history and the fifth consecutive season in EFL League Two, Along with League Two, the club also participated in the FA Cup, the EFL Trophy, and the EFL Cup.

The season covers the period from 1 July 2020 to 30 June 2021.

== Transfers ==
=== Transfers in ===
| Date | Position | Nationality | Name | From | Fee | Ref. |
|---|---|---|---|---|---|---|
| 29 July 2020 | CF | (England) | Andy Williams | (England) Northampton Town | Free transfer | |
| 1 August 2020 | LB | (England) | Lewis Freestone | (England) Brighton & Hove Albion | Free transfer | |
| 4 August 2020 | CM | (England) | Liam Sercombe | (England) Bristol Rovers | Free transfer | |
| 3 September 2020 | GK | (England) | Max Harris | (England) Oxford United | Free transfer | |
| 8 September 2020 | RM | (England) | Matty Blair | (England) Doncaster Rovers | Free transfer | |
| 15 October 2020 | CM | (England) | Ellis Chapman | (England) Lincoln City | Free transfer | |

=== Loans in ===
| Date from | Position | Nationality | Name | From | Date until | Ref. |
|---|---|---|---|---|---|---|
| 1 August 2020 | AM | (England) | Finn Azaz | (England) West Bromwich Albion | End of season | |
| 13 August 2020 | GK | (England) | Joshua Griffiths | (England) West Bromwich Albion | End of season | |
| 20 August 2020 | CM | (Guyana) | Elliot Bonds | (England) Hull City | End of season | |
| 22 September 2020 | DM | (England) | Tom Sang | (Wales) Cardiff City | 4 January 2021 | |
| 29 January 2021 | CF | (England) | Sam Smith | (England) Reading | End of season | |
| 29 January 2021 | LW | (United States) | Indiana Vassilev | (England) Aston Villa | End of season | |
| 1 February 2021 | CM | (England) | Callum Wright | (England) Leicester City | End of season | |

=== Loans out ===
| Date from | Position | Nationality | Name | To | Date until | Ref. |
|---|---|---|---|---|---|---|
| 23 October 2020 | MF | (England) | Felix Miles | (England) Tuffley Rovers | | |
| 18 November 2020 | CB | (England) | Grant Horton | (England) Bath City | 9 January 2021 | |
| 18 November 2020 | CF | (England) | Alex Addai | (England) Maidenhead United | December 2020 | |
| 27 November 2020 | CF | (England) | Tahvon Campbell | (England) Gloucester City | January 2021 | |
| 8 April 2021 | CF | (England) | Alex Addai | (England) Solihull Moors | End of season | |

=== Transfers out ===
| Date | Position | Nationality | Name | To | Fee | Ref. |
|---|---|---|---|---|---|---|
| 1 July 2020 | RM | (England) | Archie Brennan | (England) Cirencester Town | Released | |
| 1 July 2020 | LB | (Nigeria) | Josh Debayo | Unattached | Rejected contract | |
| 1 July 2020 | DM | (England) | Rohan Ince | (England) Maidenhead United | Released | |
| 1 July 2020 | GK | (England) | Rhys Lovett | (England) Gloucester City | Released | |
| 1 July 2020 | CF | (Bermuda) | Jonté Smith | (England) Woking | Released | |
| 1 July 2020 | LW | (England) | Luke Varney | (England) Burton Albion | Released | |
| 23 July 2020 | CF | (England) | Aaron Basford | (England) Evesham United | Free transfer | |
| 24 August 2020 | RM | (Wales) | Ryan Broom | (England) Peterborough United | Undisclosed | |
| 5 January 2021 | CF | (England) | Reuben Reid | (England) Yeovil Town | Free transfer | |

== Pre-season ==
Cheltenham Town announced pre-season friendlies against Bristol City, Evesham United and Stratford Town.

| 15 August 2020 Friendly | Evesham United | 1–3 | Cheltenham Town | Evesham |
| 15:00 BST | Ebanks | Report | Campbell x2 Williams | Stadium: The Spiers & Hartwell Jubilee Stadium; Attendance: 0 |

| 18 August 2020 Friendly | Stratford Town | 0–3 | Cheltenham Town | Tiddington |
| 16:00 BST | | Report | Sercombe 9'; Bowry 31'; May 53' | Stadium: Knights Lane; Attendance: 0 |

| 21 August 2020 Friendly | Bristol City | 4–0 | Cheltenham Town | Ashton Gate |
| 12:00 BST | Wells 8', 44', 45'; Weimann 87' | Report | | Stadium: Ashton Gate Stadium; Attendance: 0 |

| 29 August 2020 Friendly | Cheltenham Town | 2–1 | Wolverhampton Wanderers U23 | Lilleshall |
| 12:00 BST | Sercombe 20'; Azaz 28' | Report | Campbell 64' | Attendance: 0 |

== Competitions ==
=== EFL League Two ===
==== League table ====
| Pos | Team | Pld | W | D | L | GF | GA | GD | Pts | Promotion, qualification or relegation |
|---|---|---|---|---|---|---|---|---|---|---|
| 1 | Cheltenham Town (C, P) | 46 | 24 | 10 | 12 | 61 | 39 | +22 | 82 | Promotion to the EFL League One |
| 2 | Cambridge United (P) | 46 | 24 | 8 | 14 | 73 | 49 | +24 | 80 | Promotion to the EFL League One |
| 3 | Bolton Wanderers (P) | 46 | 23 | 10 | 13 | 59 | 50 | +9 | 79 | Promotion to the EFL League One |
| 4 | Morecambe (O, P) | 46 | 23 | 9 | 14 | 69 | 58 | +11 | 78 | Qualification for League Two play-offs |
| 5 | Newport County | 46 | 20 | 13 | 13 | 57 | 42 | +15 | 73 | Qualification for League Two play-offs |
| 6 | Forest Green Rovers | 46 | 20 | 13 | 13 | 59 | 51 | +8 | 73 | Qualification for League Two play-offs |
| 7 | Tranmere Rovers | 46 | 20 | 13 | 13 | 55 | 50 | +5 | 73 | Qualification for League Two play-offs |
| 8 | Salford City | 46 | 19 | 14 | 13 | 54 | 34 | +20 | 71 | |

Updated to match(es) played on 31 May 2021. Source: EFL Official Website
Rules for classification: 1) Points; 2) Goal difference; 3) Number of goals scored; 4) Head-to-head results; 5) Wins; 6) Away goals; 7) Penalty points (sec 9.5); 8) 12-point sending off offences
(C) Champions; (O) Play-off winners; (P) Promoted

==== Results summary ====
| Overall | | | | | | | | Home | | | | | | Away | | | | | |
| Pld | W | D | L | GF | GA | GD | Pts | W | D | L | GF | GA | GD | W | D | L | GF | GA | GD |
|---|---|---|---|---|---|---|---|---|---|---|---|---|---|---|---|---|---|---|---|
| 46 | 24 | 10 | 12 | 61 | 39 | +22 | 82 | 13 | 5 | 5 | 37 | 21 | +16 | 11 | 5 | 7 | 24 | 18 | +6 |

Last updated: 8 May 2021.
Source: BBC

==== Results by matchday ====
| Matchday | 1 | 2 | 3 | 4 | 5 | 6 | 7 | 8 | 9 | 10 | 11 | 12 | 13 | 14 | 15 | 16 | 17 | 18 | 19 | 20 | 21 | 22 | 23 | 24 | 25 | 26 | 27 | 28 | 29 | 30 | 31 | 32 | 33 | 34 | 35 | 36 | 37 | 38 | 39 | 40 | 41 | 42 | 43 | 44 | 45 | 46 |
|---|---|---|---|---|---|---|---|---|---|---|---|---|---|---|---|---|---|---|---|---|---|---|---|---|---|---|---|---|---|---|---|---|---|---|---|---|---|---|---|---|---|---|---|---|---|---|
| Ground | H | A | A | H | H | A | H | H | A | H | A | A | H | H | A | H | A | H | A | H | A | A | H | H | A | A | A | H | A | A | H | H | A | A | H | H | A | H | A | H | A | A | H | H | A | H |
| Result | L | W | W | W | L | W | W | D | L | W | L | W | W | D | W | W | D | L | L | D | D | D | D | W | D | W | W | L | W | W | W | W | L | W | L | W | L | W | D | W | L | W | W | D | L | W |
| Position | 18 | 11 | 8 | 4 | 5 | 3 | 3 | 3 | 5 | 3 | 6 | 3 | 2 | 2 | 2 | 2 | 2 | 3 | 4 | 4 | 4 | 6 | 6 | 4 | 4 | 3 | 3 | 3 | 3 | 3 | 1 | 1 | 1 | 1 | 1 | 1 | 2 | 2 | 2 | 1 | 2 | 2 | 1 | 1 | 1 | 1 |

Updated to match(es) played on 8 May 2021. Source: 11v11 for league tables and fixtures
A = Away; H = Home; W = Win; D = Draw; L = Loss

==== Matches ====
Win Draw Loss Postponed

The 2020–21 season fixtures were released on 21 August.

| 12 September 2020 1 | Cheltenham Town | 1–2 | Morecambe | Cheltenham |
| 15:00 BST | May 28' | Report | Davis (yellow card) 40'; Phillips 78' (pen.); Mendes Gomes 90+1' | Stadium: Jonny-Rocks Stadium; Attendance: 0 Referee: Carl Brook |

| 19 September 2020 2 | Tranmere Rovers | 0–3 | Cheltenham Town | Birkenhead |
| 15:00 BST | Vaughan (yellow card) 44'; Lewis (yellow card) 90+1' | Report | Raglan 6'; Williams 20'; Lewis 39' (o.g.); Sercombe (yellow card) 88'; Blair (yellow card) 88' | Stadium: Prenton Park; Attendance: 0 Referee: Carl Boyeson |

| 3 October 2020 3 | Leyton Orient | 0–2 | Cheltenham Town | Leyton |
| 15:00 BST | Brophy (yellow card) 82'; McAnuff (yellow card) 83'; Cissé (yellow card) 85'; Sotiriou (yellow card) 90+1'; Coulson (yellow card) 90+2' | Report | Ling 16' (o.g.); Azaz 29'; Boyle (yellow card) 57'; Bonds (yellow card) 82' | Stadium: The Breyer Group Stadium; Attendance: 0 Referee: Peter Wright |

| 10 October 2020 4 | Cheltenham Town | 2–0 | Crawley Town | Cheltenham |
| 15:00 BST | Craig 33' (o.g.); Thomas (yellow card) 37'; Williams 48' | Report | Nadesan (yellow card) 90+1' | Stadium: Whaddon Road; Attendance: 0 Referee: Trevor Kettle |

| 13 October 2020 5 | Cheltenham Town | 1–3 | Grimsby Town | Cheltenham |
| 19:00 BST | Williams 28'; Bonds (yellow card) 49' | Report | Edwards 23'; Tilley 39'; Pollock (yellow card) 67'; Hendrie (yellow card) 84'; Windsor 90+4' | Stadium: Whaddon Road; Attendance: 0 Referee: Paul Howard |

| 17 October 2020 6 | Southend United | 0–2 | Cheltenham Town | Southend-on-Sea |
| 15:00 BST | Demetriou (yellow card) 67' | Report | Sercombe 10' (pen.); Lloyd 52' | Stadium: Roots Hall; Attendance: 0 Referee: James Oldham |

| 20 October 2020 7 | Cheltenham Town | 1–0 | Scunthorpe United | Cheltenham |
| 18:00 BST | Reid 5' (pen.); Boyle (yellow card) 27'; Raglan (yellow card) 60' | Report | Spence (yellow card) 35' | Stadium: Whaddon Road; Attendance: 0 Referee: Sam Allison |

| 24 October 2020 8 | Cheltenham Town | 0–0 | Mansfield Town | Cheltenham |
| 15:00 BST | | Report | Perch (yellow card) 16'; McLaughlin (yellow card) 55'; Menayese (yellow card) 62' | Stadium: Whaddon Road; Attendance: 0 Referee: Neil Hair |

| 27 October 2020 9 | Port Vale | 2–1 | Cheltenham Town | Burslem |
| 19:00 GMT | Legge 52'; Worrall 68' | Report | Williams 48' | Stadium: Vale Park; Attendance: 0 Referee: Dean Whitesone |

| 31 October 2020 10 | Cheltenham Town | 2–1 | Forest Green Rovers | Cheltenham |
| 15:00 GMT | Boyle 11' (yellow card) 14'; May (yellow card) 26'; Williams 57'; Sercombe (yellow card) 58'; Clements (yellow card) 73' | Report | Collins 73' (pen.); Adams (yellow card) 76' | Stadium: Whaddon Road; Attendance: 0 Referee: Graham Salisbury |

| 3 November 2020 11 | Oldham Athletic | 2–1 | Cheltenham Town | Oldham |
| 18:00 GMT | Blackwood 34'; Bahamboula (yellow card) 82'; Clarke 85' | Report | Thomas (yellow card) 26'; Reid 30'; Clements (yellow card) 55'; May (yellow card) 77' | Stadium: Boundary Park; Attendance: 0 Referee: Will Finnie |

| 14 November 2020 12 | Carlisle United | 1–2 | Cheltenham Town | Carlisle |
| 15:00 GMT | Mellish 45+3' | Report | Boyle 15'; Thomas 36' (pen.) | Stadium: Brunton Park; Attendance: 0 Referee: Andy Haines |

| 21 November 2020 13 | Cheltenham Town | 3–0 | Walsall | Cheltenham |
| 15:00 GMT | Scarr 50' (o.g.); Blair 58'; May (yellow card) 86'; Tozer 88' | Report | Kinsella (yellow card) 10'; Holden (yellow card) 44'; Lavery (yellow card) 81'; Jules (yellow card) 86' | Stadium: Whaddon Road; Attendance: 0 Referee: Sam Purkiss |

| 24 November 2020 14 | Cheltenham Town | 1–1 | Cambridge United | Cheltenham |
| 19:00 GMT | Tozer 45+4'; Chapman (yellow card) 58'; Lloyd (yellow card) 90+3' | Report | Digby (yellow card) 90+3'; Mullin 90+5' | Stadium: Whaddon Road; Attendance: 0 Referee: Craig Hicks |

| 1 December 2020 15 | Bradford City | 1–2 | Cheltenham Town | Bradford |
| 19:00 GMT | Donaldson 23' | Report | May 45'; Clements 76' | Stadium: Utilita Energy Stadium; Attendance: 0 Referee: Seb Stockbridge |

| 5 December 2020 16 | Cheltenham Town | 5–3 | Exeter City | Cheltenham |
| 15:00 GMT | Sercombe 7', 45+3' (pen.); May 13' (yellow card) 47'; Blair (yellow card) 40' Williams 77'; Boyle 90+1' | Report | Collins 4'; Sweeney (yellow card) 45+3'; Jay 56'; Law 88' | Stadium: Whaddon Road; Attendance: 2000; Referee: Bobby Madley |

| 12 December 2020 17 | Salford City | 0–0 | Cheltenham Town | Salford |
| 15:00 GMT | Henderson (yellow card) 58' | Report | | Stadium: Moor Lane; Attendance: 0 Referee: Ben Toner |

| 15 December 2020 18 | Cheltenham Town | 0–1 | Bolton Wanderers | Cheltenham |
| 19:45 GMT | Sang (yellow card) 80'; Raglan (yellow card) 90+5' | Report | Delaney 90+1' | Stadium: Whaddon Road Ground; Attendance: 1,685; Referee: Antony Coggins |

| 19 December 2020 19 | Barrow | 3–0 | Cheltenham Town | Barrow-in-Furness |
| 15:00 GMT | Quigley 43' (pen.); James 52'; Brown (yellow card) 73'; Biggins 74' | Report | Clements (yellow card) 19'; Boyle (yellow card) 41'; Hussey (yellow card) 76' | Stadium: Furness Building Society Stadium; Attendance: 1,363; Referee: Marc Edwards |

| 26 December 2020 20 | Cheltenham Town | 1–1 | Stevenage | Cheltenham |
| 15:00 GMT | Sercombe 28' | Report | Vancooten (yellow card) 61'; Aitchison 80' | Stadium: Whaddon Road Ground; Attendance: 0 Referee: Chris Sarginson |

| 29 December 2020 21 | Colchester United | 0–0 | Cheltenham Town | Colchester |
| 19:45 GMT | Lapslie (yellow card) 89' | Report | Clements (yellow card) 75' | Stadium: JobServe Community Stadium; Attendance: 0 Referee: David Rock |

| 16 January 2021 22 | Bolton Wanderers | 1–1 | Cheltenham Town | Horwich |
| 15:00 GMT | Isgrove (yellow card) 78'; Doyle 86' | Report | May 54' | Stadium: University of Bolton Stadium; Attendance: 0 Referee: Andy Haines |

| 19 January 2021 23 | Cheltenham Town | 1–1 | Newport County | Cheltenham |
| 19:00 GMT | Blair 45+5'; Raglan (yellow card) 56'; Tozer (yellow card) 64' | Report | King 12' | Stadium: Whaddon Road Ground; Attendance: 0 Referee: Peter Wright |

| 26 January 2021 24 | Cheltenham Town | 2–0 | Oldham Athletic | Cheltenham |
| 19:00 GMT | Williams 54'; May (yellow card) 62', (goal) 83' | Report | | Stadium: Whaddon Road Ground; Attendance: 0 Referee: Carl Brook |

| 30 January 2021 25 | Forest Green Rovers | 0–0 | Cheltenham Town | Nailsworth |
| 15:00 GMT | Adams (yellow card) 44' (yellow-red card) 69' | Report | Clements (yellow card) 32'; Boyle (yellow card) 49' | Stadium: The Innocent [Insert Name Here] Stadium; Attendance: 0 Referee: Ollie Yates |

| 9 February 2021 26 | Harrogate Town | 0–1 | Cheltenham Town | Harrogate |
| 18:00 GMT | | Report | Boyle 43' | Stadium: The EnviroVent Stadium; Attendance: 0 Referee: Graham Salisbury |

| 16 February 2021 27 | Walsall | 1–2 | Cheltenham Town | Bescot |
| 19:00 GMT | Lavery 3'; Norman (yellow card) 75'; Bates (yellow card) 79' | Report | Smith 35'; Wright 43' | Stadium: Banks's Stadium; Attendance: 0 Referee: David Webb |

| 20 February 2021 28 | Cheltenham Town | 0–2 | Bradford City | Cheltenham |
| 15:00 GMT | Thomas (yellow card) 2'; May (yellow card) 85' | Report | Cook 12', 51'; Watt (yellow card) 63' | Stadium: Whaddon Road Ground; Attendance: 0 Referee: Matt Donohue |

| 23 February 2021 29 | Cambridge United | 0–1 | Cheltenham Town | Cambridge |
| 19:00 GMT | Hannant (yellow card) 66'; Boateng (yellow card) 83' | Report | Long (yellow card) 60', (goal) 63'; Azaz (yellow card) 79' | Stadium: The Abbey Stadium; Attendance: 0 Referee: James Oldham |

| 27 February 2021 30 | Scunthorpe United | 0–2 | Cheltenham Town | Scunthorpe |
| 15:00 GMT | | Report | Smith 25'; Wright 41'; Thomas (yellow card) 61' | Stadium: Sands Venue Stadium; Attendance: 0 Referee: Christopher Pollard |

| 2 March 2021 31 | Cheltenham Town | 1–0 | Southend United | Cheltenham |
| 19:00 GMT | Thomas 53' (pen.) | Report | | Stadium: Whaddon Road Ground; Attendance: 0 Referee: Will Finnie |

| 6 March 2021 32 | Cheltenham Town | 3–2 | Port Vale | Cheltenham |
| 15:00 GMT | May 14'; Brown 18' (o.g.); Sercombe 75' | Report | Guthrie (yellow card) 65'; Crookes (yellow card) 74'; Swan 83'; Hurst 85' | Stadium: Whaddon Road Ground; Attendance: 0 Referee: Robert Lewis |

| 9 March 2021 33 | Mansfield Town | 3–1 | Cheltenham Town | Mansfield |
| 19:00 GMT | Bowery 55', 65'; Reid 63' | Report | Griffiths (yellow card) 10'; Smith 51' | Stadium: One Call Stadium; Attendance: 0 Referee: Scott Oldham |

| 13 March 2021 34 | Exeter City | 0–1 | Cheltenham Town | Exeter |
| 15:00 GMT | Taylor (yellow card) 81' | Report | Williams 90+1' | Stadium: St James Park; Attendance: 0 Referee: Josh Smith |

| 16 March 2021 35 | Cheltenham Town | 0–2 | Barrow | Cheltenham |
| 19:00 GMT | | Report | Jones 2'; Kay (yellow card) 28'; Davies (yellow card) 61'; Long 66' (o.g.) | Stadium: Whaddon Road Ground; Attendance: 0 Referee: James Bell |

| 20 March 2021 36 | Cheltenham Town | 2–0 | Salford City | Cheltenham |
| 15:00 GMT | Long 3'; Sercombe (yellow card) 16', (goal) 41'; Thomas (yellow card) 64' | Report | | Stadium: Whaddon Road Ground; Attendance: 0 Referee: Lee Swabey |

| 27 March 2021 37 | Morecambe | 1–0 | Cheltenham Town | Morecambe |
| 15:00 GMT | McAlinden 20' | Report | | Stadium: Mazuma Stadium; Attendance: 0 Referee: Marc Edwards |

| 2 April 2021 38 | Cheltenham Town | 4–0 | Tranmere Rovers | Cheltenham |
| 15:00 BST | Thomas 4'; Boyle 14'; Sercombe (yellow card) 35'; May 42'; Smith (yellow card) 52'; Wright 57' | Report | O'Connor (yellow card) 45+3' | Stadium: Whaddon Road Ground; Attendance: 0 Referee: John Busby |

| 5 April 2021 39 | Grimsby Town | 1–1 | Cheltenham Town | Cleethorpes |
| 15:00 BST | John-Lewis 8' | Report | Boyle 34' | Stadium: Blundell Park; Attendance: 0 Referee: Andy Davies |

| 10 April 2021 40 | Cheltenham Town | 1–0 | Leyton Orient | Cheltenham |
| 15:00 BST | Thomas (yellow card) 17', (goal) 31' (pen.) | Report | Vigouroux (yellow card) 30'; Turley (yellow card) 60' | Stadium: Whaddon Road Ground; Attendance: 0 Referee: Thomas Bramall |

| 16 April 2021 41 | Crawley Town | 1–0 | Cheltenham Town | Crawley |
| 18:30 BST | Maguire-Drew 77'; Nichols (yellow card) 87' | Report | Wright (yellow card) 45+4' | Stadium: The People's Pension Stadium; Attendance: 0 Referee: Sam Purkiss |

| 20 April 2021 42 | Stevenage | 0–1 | Cheltenham Town | Stevenage |
| 19:00 BST | | Report | Lloyd 43' | Stadium: Lamex Stadium; Attendance: 0 Referee: Trevor Kettle |

| 24 April 2021 43 | Cheltenham Town | 1–0 | Colchester United | Cheltenham |
| 15:00 BST | Long (yellow card) 20'; Thomas 82'; Blair (yellow card) 86' | Report | Pell (yellow card) 40'; Smith (yellow card) 89' | Stadium: Whaddon Road Ground; Attendance: 0 Referee: Paul Howard |

| 27 April 2021 44 | Cheltenham Town | 1–1 | Carlisle United | Cheltenham |
| 19:00 BST | Hussey 56' | Report | Kayode 33'; Hayden (yellow card) 72'; Mellish (yellow card) 87'; Anderton (yellow card) 90+4' | Stadium: Whaddon Road Ground; Attendance: 0 Referee: Kevin Johnson |

| 1 May 2021 45 | Newport County | 1–0 | Cheltenham Town | Newport |
| 15:00 BST | Labadie 4'; Bennett (yellow card) 55' | Report | May (yellow card) 56'; Tozer (yellow card) 88'; Long (yellow card) 90+5' | Stadium: Rodney Parade; Attendance: 0 Referee: Scott Oldham |

| 8 May 2021 46 | Cheltenham Town | 4–1 | Harrogate Town | Cheltenham |
| 15:00 BST | Sercombe 11'; Smith 22'; May 34'; Wright 56' | Report | Muldoon 7' | Stadium: Whaddon Road; Attendance: 0 Referee: Ben Speedie |

=== FA Cup ===
The draw for the first round was made on Monday 26, October. The second round draw was revealed on Monday, 9 November by Danny Cowley. The third round draw was made on 30 November, with Premier League and EFL Championship clubs all entering the competition. The draw for the fourth and fifth round were made on 11 January, conducted by Peter Crouch.

Win Draw Loss

| 7 November 2020 First round | Cheltenham Town | 3–1 | South Shields | Cheltenham |
| 15:00 GMT | May 12', 53'; Sercombe 62' | Report | Osei 18' | Stadium: Whaddon Road; Attendance: 0 Referee: Martin Woods |

| 28 November 2020 Second round | Cheltenham Town | 2–1 (a.e.t.) | Crewe Alexandra | Cheltenham |
| 15:00 GMT | Azaz 2'; Freestone (yellow card) 30'; May (yellow card) 80'; Lloyd 94' | Report | Porter 63' | Stadium: Whaddon Road Ground; Attendance: 0 Referee: James Adcock |

| 10 January 2021 Third round | Cheltenham Town | 2–1 (a.e.t.) | Mansfield Town | Cheltenham |
| 13:30 GMT | May 73'; Boyle 110' | Report | McLaughlin 3'; O'Keeffe (yellow card) 69'; Sweeney (yellow card) 101' | Stadium: Whaddon Road Ground; Attendance: 0 Referee: Tom Nield |

| 23 January 2021 Fourth round | Cheltenham Town | 1–3 | Manchester City | Cheltenham |
| 17:30 GMT | Boyle (yellow card) 24'; Raglan (yellow card) 48'; May 59'; Tozer (yellow card) 85' | Report | Laporte (yellow card) 60'; Foden 81'; Gabriel Jesus 84'; Torres 90+4' | Stadium: Whaddon Road Ground; Attendance: 0 Referee: Stuart Attwell |

=== EFL Cup ===
Win Draw Loss

The first round draw was made on 18 August, live on Sky Sports, by Paul Merson. The draw for both the second and third round were confirmed on September 6, live on Sky Sports by Phil Babb.

| 5 September 2020 First round | Peterborough United | 0–1 | Cheltenham Town | Peterborough |
| 15:00 BST | Thompson (yellow card) 38' | Report | Thomas (yellow card) 26'; Sercombe 59' | Stadium: Weston Homes Stadium; Attendance: 0 Referee: Alan Young |

| 15 September 2020 Second round | Millwall | 3–1 | Cheltenham Town | Bermondsey |
| 18:00 BST | Leonard 19'; Mahoney 49'; Smith 62' | Report | Boyle (yellow card) 17'; Azaz 69' | Stadium: The Den; Attendance: 0 Referee: John Busby |

=== EFL Trophy ===
Win Draw Loss

The regional group stage draw was confirmed on 18 August. The second round draw was made by Matt Murray on 20 November, at St Andrew's.

| Pos | Div | Team | Pld | W | PW | PL | L | GF | GA | GD | Pts | Qualification |
|---|---|---|---|---|---|---|---|---|---|---|---|---|
| 1 | L2 | Cheltenham Town | 3 | 3 | 0 | 0 | 0 | 4 | 0 | +4 | 9 | Advance to Round 2 |
| 2 | ACA | Norwich City U21 | 3 | 2 | 0 | 0 | 1 | 8 | 3 | +5 | 6 | Advance to Round 2 |
| 3 | L1 | Plymouth Argyle | 3 | 1 | 0 | 0 | 2 | 5 | 6 | −1 | 3 | |
| 4 | L2 | Newport County | 3 | 0 | 0 | 0 | 3 | 1 | 9 | −8 | 0 | |

Source: EFL.com

| 8 September 2020 Group stage | Newport County | 0–1 | Cheltenham Town | Newport |
| 19:00 BST | Willmott (yellow card) 56' | Report | Reid 70'; Chamberlain (yellow card) 90' | Stadium: Rodney Parade; Attendance: 0 Referee: James Adcock |

| 6 October 2020 Group stage | Cheltenham Town | 2–0 | Plymouth Argyle | Cheltenham |
| 19:45 BST | Reid 56', 77'; May (yellow card) 81' | Report | Cooper (yellow card) 87' | Stadium: Whaddon Road; Attendance: 0 Referee: Chris Sarginson |

| 10 November 2020 Group stage | Cheltenham Town | 1–0 | Norwich City U21 | Cheltenham |
| 18:00 GMT | Lloyd 67'; Addai (yellow card) 68'; Freestone (yellow card) 82'; Ebanks (yellow card) 87' | Report | Omotoye (yellow card) 73' | Stadium: Whaddon Road; Attendance: 0 Referee: Ollie Yates |

| 8 December 2020 Second round | Cheltenham Town | 0–3 | Portsmouth | Cheltenham |
| 19:00 GMT | Tozer (yellow card) 43' | Report | Mnoga 15' (yellow card) 26'; Hiwula 29', 50' | Stadium: Whaddon Road; Attendance: 0 Referee: Neil Hair |
