= 2019–20 Cheltenham Town F.C. season =

Cheltenham Town F.C.
2019–20 season
- Chairman: Andy Wilcox
- Manager: Michael Duff
- Stadium: Whaddon Road
- League Two: 4th
- FA Cup: Second round
- EFL Cup: First round
- EFL Trophy: Group stage
- EFL play-offs: Semi-finals
- Top goalscorer: League: Ryan Broom (8); All: Ryan Broom (8)
Home colours	Away colours

The 2019–20 season was Cheltenham Town's 133rd season in existence and their fourth consecutive season in League Two. Along with competing in League Two, the club also participated in the FA Cup, EFL Cup and EFL Trophy.

The season covered the period from 1 July 2019 to 30 June 2020.

== Pre-season ==
The Robins announced pre-season friendlies against Stratford Town, Hereford, Taunton Town, Leicester City, Shrewsbury Town, and Bromsgrove Sporting.

13 July 2019 Friendly	Stratford Town	2–1	Cheltenham Town	Tiddington
15:00 BST	Shariff 18'; Morrison 75'	Report	Varney 88'	Stadium: Knights Lane; Attendance: 434

17 July 2019 Friendly	Hereford	2–2	Cheltenham Town	Hereford
19:45 BST	Styche 41'; Cullinane-Liburd 53'	Report	Boyle 19'; Lloyd 45'	Stadium: Edgar Street; Attendance: 648

19 July 2019 Friendly	Taunton Town	7–0	Cheltenham Town	Taunton
19:45 BST	Neal 11', 26', 64'; Price 57'; Short 80'; Sullivan 85'; Cohen 90'	Report		Stadium: The Viridor Stadium; Attendance: 300

20 July 2019 Friendly	Cheltenham Town	1–2	Leicester City	Cheltenham
15:00 BST	Varney 17'	Report	Vardy 69'; Albrighton 76'	Stadium: Jonny-Rocks Stadium; Attendance: 3,707; Referee: John Busby

23 July 2019 Friendly	Cheltenham Town	2–2	Shrewsbury Town	Cheltenham
19:45 BST	Campbell 43', 60'	Report	Whalley 24'; Eisa 80'	Stadium: Jonny-Rocks Stadium; Attendance: 841; Referee: John Busby

27 July 2019 Friendly	Cheltenham Town	2–3	Burnley U23	Cheltenham
15:00 BST	Varney 9', 28'	Report	Trialist 4'; Trialist 11'; Thomas 51'	Stadium: Jonny-Rocks Stadium; Referee: John Busby

30 July 2019 Friendly	Bromsgrove Sporting	Abandoned	Cheltenham Town	Bromsgrove
19:45 BST		Report; Match abandoned before kick-off due to a waterlogged pitch.		Stadium: Victoria Ground

== Competitions ==
=== League Two ===
==== League table ====
Pos	Team	Pld	W	D	L	GF	GA	GD	Pts	PPG	Promotion, qualification or relegation
1	Swindon Town (C, P)	36	21	6	9	62	39	+23	69	1.92	Promotion to EFL League One
2	Crewe Alexandra (P)	37	20	9	8	67	43	+24	69	1.86	Promotion to EFL League One
3	Plymouth Argyle (P)	37	20	8	9	61	39	+22	68	1.84	Promotion to EFL League One
4	Cheltenham Town	36	17	13	6	52	27	+25	64	1.78	Qualification for League Two play-offs (Note: Four teams play for one spot and promotion to EFL League One.)
5	Exeter City	37	18	11	8	53	43	+10	65	1.76	Qualification for League Two play-offs
6	Colchester United	37	15	13	9	52	37	+15	58	1.57	Qualification for League Two play-offs
7	Northampton Town (O, P)	37	17	7	13	54	40	+14	58	1.57	Qualification for League Two play-offs
8	Port Vale	37	14	15	8	50	44	+6	57	1.54	

Source: EFL Official Website
Rules for classification: 1) Points per game; 2) Goal difference; 3) Number of goals scored; 4) Head-to-head results; 5) Wins; 6) Away goals; 7) Penalty points (sec 9.5); 8) 12-point sending off offences
(C) Champions; (O) Play-off winners; (P) Promoted

==== Results summary ====
Overall								Home						Away					
Pld	W	D	L	GF	GA	GD	Pts	W	D	L	GF	GA	GD	W	D	L	GF	GA	GD
36	17	13	6	52	27	+25	64	11	5	2	35	17	+18	6	8	4	17	10	+7

Last updated: 7 March 2020.
Source: BBC

==== Results by matchday ====
Matchday	1	2	3	4	5	6	7	8	9	10	11	12	13	14	15	16	17	18	19	20	21	22	23	24	25	26	27	28	29	30	31	32	33	34	35	36
Ground	A	H	A	H	H	A	H	A	H	A	H	A	A	H	H	A	H	A	A	H	A	H	A	A	H	H	A	A	H	A	A	H	H	H	A	H
Result	L	W	D	W	D	L	W	W	W	W	D	D	W	W	L	D	D	D	W	D	D	L	D	D	W	W	L	D	W	L	W	W	W	W	W	D
Position	17	7	11	5	8	11	6	6	3	3	3	5	5	2	6	6	6	5	4	3	4	7	8	8	5	3	7	8	7	7	7	5	5	5	4	5

Updated to match(es) played on 7 March 2020. Source: Statto.com
A = Away; H = Home; W = Win; D = Draw; L = Loss

==== Matches ====
On Thursday, 20 June 2019, the EFL League Two fixtures were revealed.

3 August 2019 1	Leyton Orient	1–0	Cheltenham Town	Leyton
15:00 BST	Wright 68'	Report	Varney (yellow card) 7' (yellow-red card) 70'; Ince (red card) 72'	Stadium: The Breyer Group Stadium; Attendance: 6,534; Referee: Michael Salisbury

10 August 2019 2	Cheltenham Town	4–1	Scunthorpe United	Cheltenham
15:00 BST	Broom 68'; Raglan 72'; Addai 74'; Thomas 90+4' (pen.)	Report	Songo'o (yellow card) 42'; Novak 55'; McGahey (yellow card) 90+1'	Stadium: Whaddon Road; Attendance: 2,742; Referee: Leigh Doughty

17 August 2019 3	Morecambe	0–0	Cheltenham Town	Morecambe
15:00 BST	Roche (yellow card) 79'	Report	Long (yellow card) 58'	Stadium: Globe Arena; Attendance: 1,692; Referee: David Rock

20 August 2019 4	Cheltenham Town	2–0	Carlisle United	Cheltenham
19:45 BST	Tozer (yellow card) 7'; Reilly 15'; Varney 45'	Report	Scougall (yellow card) 35'; Iredale (yellow card) 43'; Thomas (yellow card) 56'	Stadium: Jonny-Rocks Stadium; Attendance: 2,634; Referee: Will Finnie

24 August 2019 5	Cheltenham Town	2–2	Swindon Town	Cheltenham
15:00 BST	Hussey 19'; Broom (yellow card) 25'; Varney 41'	Report	Doyle 6', 33'; Isgrove (yellow card) 19'; Doughty (red card) 71'; Lyden (yellow card) 78'	Stadium: Jonny-Rocks Stadium; Attendance: 4,401; Referee: Trevor Kettle

31 August 2019 6	Crawley Town	1–0	Cheltenham Town	Crawley
15:00 BST	Doherty (yellow card) 82'; Palmer (yellow card) 90+1' (goal) 90+1'	Report	Clements (yellow card) 77'	Stadium: The People's Pension Stadium; Attendance: 2,095; Referee: Ben Toner

7 September 2019 7	Cheltenham Town	4–2	Stevenage	Cheltenham
15:00 BST	Reilly 22'; Long 57'; Broom 80'; Addai 90+1'	Report	Newton 48', 72'	Stadium: Jonny-Rocks Stadium; Attendance: 2,708; Referee: James Oldham

14 September 2019 8	Salford City	0–2	Cheltenham Town	Salford
15:00 BST	Burgess (yellow card) 66'	Report	Broom 32', 82' (yellow card) 83'	Stadium: The Peninsula Stadium; Attendance: 2,389; Referee: Craig Hicks

17 September 2019 9	Cheltenham Town	3–2	Bradford City	Cheltenham
19:45 BST	Reilly 59'; Doyle-Hayes 69'; Tozer 80'; Addai (yellow card) 90+7'	Report	Anderson (yellow card) 19' (goal) 51'; Vaughan (yellow card) 45+1'; Richards-Everton 76' (yellow card) 85'; Mellor (yellow card) 90+1'	Stadium: Jonny-Rocks Stadium; Attendance: 2,702; Referee: Sam Purkiss

21 September 2019 10	Plymouth Argyle	0–2	Cheltenham Town	Plymouth
15:00 BST		Report	Doyle-Hayes (yellow card) 18'; Varney 40' (yellow card) 50'; Raglan (yellow card) 88'; Aimson 90+1' (o.g.)	Stadium: Home Park; Attendance: 8,956; Referee: Scott Oldham

28 September 2019 11	Cheltenham Town	1–1	Crewe Alexandra	Cheltenham
15:00 BST	Reilly 9'; Doyle-Hayes (yellow card) 40'; Hussey (yellow card) 54'; Varney (yellow card) 66'	Report	Hunt (yellow card) 17'; Powell (yellow card) 44'; Porter 45+1'; Ng (yellow card) 49' (yellow-red card) 70'; Jones (yellow card) 58'	Stadium: Jonny-Rocks Stadium; Attendance: 3,549; Referee: Lee Swabey

5 October 2019 12	Oldham Athletic	1–1	Cheltenham Town	Oldham
15:00 BST	Morais 9'; Maouche (yellow card) 24'; Hamer (yellow card) 59'; Sylla (yellow card) 82'	Report	Hussey (yellow card) 41'; Broom (yellow card) 66' (goal) 71'; Addai (yellow card) 86'; Greaves (yellow card) 89'	Stadium: Boundary Park; Attendance: 3,496; Referee: Alan Young

12 October 2019	Cheltenham Town	v	Newport County	Cheltenham
15:00 BST		Report		Stadium: Jonny-Rocks Stadium
Note: On 5 October 2019, the match was postponed due to international call-ups.

19 October 2019 13	Walsall	1–2	Cheltenham Town	Bescot
15:00 BST	Gordon 52' (pen.); Kinsella (yellow card) 66'; Clarke (yellow card) 77'	Report	Broom (yellow card) 30'; Tozer 35'; Varney 58'; Flinders (yellow card) 81'	Stadium: Banks's Stadium; Attendance: 4,494; Referee: Darren Drysdale

22 October 2019 14	Cheltenham Town	3–0	Macclesfield Town	Cheltenham
19:45 BST	Varney 45'; Thomas 59'; Broom 76'	Report	Archibald (yellow card) 58'	Stadium: Jonny-Rocks Stadium; Attendance: 2,632; Referee: Brett Huxtable

26 October 2019	Grimsby Town	v	Cheltenham Town	Cleethorpes
15:00 BST		Report		Stadium: Blundell Park
Note: Fixture was postponed due to a waterlogged pitch.

2 November 2019 15	Cheltenham Town	1–2	Forest Green Rovers	Cheltenham
15:00 GMT	Raglan (yellow card) 23'; Varney 67'; Clements (yellow card) 86'; Ince (yellow card) 90'; Tozer (yellow card) 90+3'	Report	Aitchison 15'; Frear 40'; Collins (yellow card) 89'	Stadium: Jonny-Rocks Stadium; Attendance: 5,788; Referee: Kevin Johnson

16 November 2019 16	Exeter City	0–0	Cheltenham Town	Exeter
15:00 GMT	Jay (yellow card) 87'; Martin (yellow card) 90+3'	Report	Varney (yellow card) 72'; Thomas (yellow card) 81'	Stadium: St James Park; Attendance: 4,956; Referee: Alan Young

23 November 2019 17	Cheltenham Town	1–1	Colchester United	Cheltenham
15:00 GMT	Hussey (yellow card) 62'; Greaves (yellow card) 66'; Thomas 70' (pen.)	Report	Nouble (yellow card) 21'; Norris 28'; Gerken (yellow card) 70'; Eastman (yellow card) 79'	Stadium: Jonny-Rocks Stadium; Attendance: 3,045; Referee: Ben Toner

26 November 2019 18	Grimsby Town	0–0	Cheltenham Town	Cleethorpes
19:45 GMT	Whitehouse (yellow card) 37'; Davis (yellow card) 72'	Report		Stadium: Blundell Park; Attendance: 2,508; Referee: Christopher Pollard

7 December 2019 19	Mansfield Town	0–3	Cheltenham Town	Mansfield
15:00 GMT	MacDonald (yellow card) 25'; Maynard (yellow card) 65'	Report	Doyle-Hayes (yellow card) 23'; Smith 32'; Greaves (yellow card) 38'; Boyle 52' (yellow card) 65'; Addai 86'	Stadium: One Call Stadium; Attendance: 3,715; Referee: Sam Purkiss

14 December 2019 20	Cheltenham Town	1–1	Cambridge United	Cheltenham
15:00 GMT	Boyle 53'	Report	Ward (yellow card) 25'; Lewis 27'; Lambe (yellow card) 51'	Stadium: Jonny-Rocks Stadium; Attendance: 2,813; Referee: Robert Lewis

21 December 2019 21	Port Vale	1–1	Cheltenham Town	Burslem
15:00 GMT	Tozer 39' (o.g.); Montaño (yellow card) 89'	Report	Addai 24'; Greaves (yellow card) 33'; Tozer (yellow card) 88'; Clements (yellow card) 90+4'	Stadium: Vale Park; Attendance: 4,404; Referee: Leigh Doughty

26 December 2019 22	Cheltenham Town	0–1	Plymouth Argyle	Cheltenham
15:00 GMT		Report	Rudden 33'; Sawyer (yellow card) 45+2'	Stadium: Jonny-Rocks Stadium; Attendance: 5,192; Referee: Charles Breakspear

29 December 2019 23	Northampton Town	1–1	Cheltenham Town	Northampton
15:00 GMT	Turnbull (yellow card) 2' (goal) 38'; Hoskins (yellow card) 14'	Report	Thomas 3' (pen.); Greaves (yellow card) 55'; Sheaf (yellow card) 58'; Addai (yellow card) 90+5' (yellow-red card) 90+6'	Stadium: PTS Academy Stadium; Attendance: 5,090; Referee: Martin Coy

1 January 2020 24	Newport County	1–1	Cheltenham Town	Newport
15:00 GMT	Inniss (yellow card) 45+4'; Abrahams 47' (yellow card) 70'; Dolan (yellow card) 74'	Report	Campbell (yellow card) 6'; Tozer 86'; Raglan (yellow card) 90+2'	Stadium: Rodney Parade; Attendance: 3,913; Referee: Peter Wright

4 January 2020 25	Cheltenham Town	3–0	Oldham Athletic	Cheltenham
15:00 GMT	Sheaf 32'; May 76'; Broom 90+5'	Report	Mills (yellow card) 53'	Stadium: Jonny-Rocks Stadium; Attendance: 3,029; Referee: Brett Huxtable

11 January 2020 26	Cheltenham Town	3–1	Walsall	Cheltenham
15:00 GMT	Sheaf 18' (yellow card) 52'; Thomas 48'; May 72' (yellow card) 72'	Report	Clarke (yellow card) 57'; Adebayo 78'	Stadium: Jonny-Rocks Stadium; Attendance: 3,868; Referee: Paul Marsden

18 January 2020 27	Crewe Alexandra	1–0	Cheltenham Town	Crewe
15:00 GMT	Ng 69'	Report	Long (yellow card) 78'; Greaves (yellow card) 84'; May (yellow card) 90+3'	Stadium: Alexandra Stadium; Attendance: 4,478; Referee: Scott Oldham

25 January 2020	Cheltenham Town	v	Northampton Town	Cheltenham
15:00 GMT		Report		Stadium: Jonny-Rocks Stadium
Note: Fixture was postponed due to Northampton's involvement in the FA Cup.

28 January 2020 28	Bradford City	1–1	Cheltenham Town	Bradford
19:45 GMT	Donaldson 11' (pen.); Devitt (yellow card) 25' (yellow-red card) 45'; Wood (yellow card) 40'; Connolly (yellow card) 82'	Report	May 84'	Stadium: Northern Commercials Stadium; Attendance: 12,731; Referee: Sebastian Stockbridge

1 February 2020 29	Cheltenham Town	2–1	Morecambe	Cheltenham
15:00 GMT	Thomas 32' (pen.); May 35'; Raglan (yellow card) 44'; Varney (yellow card) 64'; Broom (yellow card) 90+1'; Doyle-Hayes (yellow card) 90+5'	Report	Kenyon (yellow card) 71'; Leitch-Smith 84'; Wildig (yellow card) 87'; Stockton (yellow card) 90+7'	Stadium: Jonny-Rocks Stadium; Attendance: 3,044; Referee: David Rock

8 February 2020 30	Scunthorpe United	1–0	Cheltenham Town	Scunthorpe
15:00 GMT	McAtee 17' (yellow card) 53'; Perch (yellow card) 61'	Report	Long (yellow card) 82'	Stadium: Sands Venue Stadium; Attendance: 3,159; Referee: Christopher Pollard

11 February 2020 31	Carlisle United	0–1	Cheltenham Town	Carlisle
19:45 GMT	Jones (yellow card) 46'	Report	Reid 26'; Broom (yellow card) 30'	Stadium: Brunton Park; Attendance: 3,088; Referee: Andy Haines

15 February 2020 32	Cheltenham Town	2–1	Leyton Orient	Cheltenham
15:00 GMT	May 18'; Broom (yellow card) 32'; Reid (yellow card) 80' (goal) 88'	Report	Wilkinson 17' (yellow card) 67'	Stadium: Jonny-Rocks Stadium; Attendance: 3,527; Referee: Jeremy Simpson

22 February 2020 33	Cheltenham Town	1–0	Mansfield Town	Cheltenham
15:00 GMT	Nichols (yellow card) 32'; Reid 65'; May (yellow card) 90'; Doyle-Hayes (yellow card) 90+1'	Report		Stadium: Jonny-Rocks Stadium; Attendance: 3,274; Referee: John Busby

25 February 2020 34	Cheltenham Town	2–1	Northampton Town	Cheltenham
19:45 GMT	Broom 19'; Boyle (yellow card) 31'; Varney 85' (yellow card) 87'	Report	Watson 3'; Harriman (yellow card) 33'; Lines (yellow card) 64'; Wharton (yellow card) 77'; Morton (yellow card) 84'	Stadium: Jonny-Rocks Stadium; Attendance: 2,934; Referee: Craig Hicks

29 February 2020 35	Colchester United	0–2	Cheltenham Town	Colchester
15:00 GMT	Pell (yellow card) 19'; Harriott (yellow card) 45'; Prosser (yellow card) 51'; Sowunmi (yellow card) 76' (yellow-red card) 90+9'	Report	May (yellow card) 20' (goal) 39'; Hussey 79'; Smith (yellow card) 90+5'	Stadium: JobServe Community Stadium; Attendance: 3,698; Referee: Sam Purkiss

7 March 2020 36	Cheltenham Town	0–0	Port Vale	Cheltenham
15:00 GMT	Raglan (yellow card) 69'	Report	Legge (yellow card) 29'	Stadium: Jonny-Rocks Stadium; Attendance: 3,741; Referee: Scott Duncan

14 March 2020	Cambridge United	v	Cheltenham Town	Cambridge
15:00 GMT				Stadium: Abbey Stadium
Note: Season was suspended until 3 April 2020, due to the COVID-19 pandemic.

17 March 2020	Macclesfield Town	v	Cheltenham Town	Macclesfield
19:45 GMT				Stadium: Moss Rose
Note: Season was suspended until 3 April 2020, due to the COVID-19 pandemic.

21 March 2020	Cheltenham Town	v	Grimsby Town	Cheltenham
15:00 GMT				Stadium: Jonny-Rocks Stadium
Note: Season was suspended until 3 April 2020, due to the COVID-19 pandemic.

24 March 2020	Cheltenham Town	v	Newport County	Cheltenham
19:45 GMT				Stadium: Jonny-Rocks Stadium
Note: Season was suspended until 3 April 2020, due to the COVID-19 pandemic.

28 March 2020	Forest Green Rovers	v	Cheltenham Town	Nailsworth
15:00 GMT				Stadium: The New Lawn
Note: Season was suspended until 3 April 2020, due to the COVID-19 pandemic.

4 April 2020	Cheltenham Town	v	Exeter City	Cheltenham
15:00 BST				Stadium: Jonny-Rocks Stadium
Note: On 3 April, the English Football League decided to postpone all football until safe to do so due to the COVID-19 pandemic.

10 April 2020	Swindon Town	v	Cheltenham Town	Swindon
15:00 BST				Stadium: County Ground
Note: On 3 April, the English Football League decided to postpone all football until safe to do so due to the COVID-19 pandemic.

13 April 2020	Cheltenham Town	v	Crawley Town	Cheltenham
13:00 BST				Stadium: Jonny-Rocks Stadium
Note: On 3 April, the English Football League decided to postpone all football until safe to do so due to the COVID-19 pandemic.

18 April 2020	Stevenage	v	Cheltenham Town	Stevenage
15:00 BST				Stadium: The Lamex Stadium
Note: On 3 April, the English Football League decided to postpone all football until safe to do so due to the COVID-19 pandemic.

25 April 2020	Cheltenham Town	v	Salford City	Cheltenham
15:00 BST				Stadium: Jonny-Rocks Stadium
Note: On 3 April, the English Football League decided to postpone all football until safe to do so due to the COVID-19 pandemic.

==== Play-offs ====
18 June 2020 Semi-final first leg	Northampton Town	0–2	Cheltenham Town	Northampton
19:45 BST	Goode (yellow card) 20'	Report	Raglan 26'; Hussey (yellow card) 45+5'; Thomas 86'	Stadium: Sixfields Stadium; Attendance: 0 Referee: Marc Edwards

22 June 2020 Semi-final second leg	Cheltenham Town	0–3 (2–3 agg.)	Northampton Town	Cheltenham
20:00 BST		Report	Oliver 9'; Morton 57', 77', (yellow card) 90+4'; Olayinka (yellow card) 79'	Stadium: Whaddon Road; Attendance: 0 Referee: Leigh Doughty

=== FA Cup ===
The first round draw was made on 21 October 2019. The second round draw was made live on 11 November from Chichester City's stadium, Oaklands Park.

9 November 2019 First round	Cheltenham Town	1–1	Swindon Town	Cheltenham
15:00 GMT	Thomas (yellow card) 57'; Boyle (yellow card) 76'; Addai 90+3'; Long (yellow card) 90+5'	Report	Hunt (yellow card) 80'; Yates 90+1'	Stadium: Jonny-Rocks Stadium; Attendance: 3,456; Referee: Scott Oldham

19 November 2019 First round replay	Swindon Town	0–1	Cheltenham Town	Swindon
19:45 GMT	Doughty (penalty missed) 3'; Jaiyesimi (yellow card) 71'	Report	Raglan (yellow card) 38'; Addai 50'; Doyle-Hayes (yellow card) 71'; Lloyd (yellow card) 84'	Stadium: County Ground; Referee: Darren Drysdale

30 November 2019 Second round	Cheltenham Town	1–3	Port Vale	Cheltenham
15:00 GMT	Reid 3' (pen.); Long (yellow card) 66'; Ince (yellow card) 81'	Report	Pope 60', 63', 68'	Stadium: Jonny-Rocks Stadium; Attendance: 2,725; Referee: Ross Joyce

=== EFL Cup ===
The first round draw was made on 20 June.

13 August 2019 First round	Bristol Rovers	3–0	Cheltenham Town	Horfield
19:45 BST	Smith 38', 49'; Clarke-Harris 67'	Report	Thomas (yellow card) 45+2'	Stadium: Memorial Stadium; Attendance: 2,909; Referee: Graham Salisbury

=== EFL Trophy ===
On 9 July 2019, the pre-determined group stage draw was announced with Invited clubs to be drawn on 12 July 2019.

Pos	Div	Team	Pld	W	PW	PL	L	GF	GA	GD	Pts	Qualification
1	L2	Exeter City	3	3	0	0	0	6	1	+5	9	Advance to Round 2
2	L2	Newport County	3	1	0	0	2	11	11	0	3	Advance to Round 2
3	ACA	West Ham United U21	3	1	0	0	2	9	11	−2	3	
4	L2	Cheltenham Town	3	1	0	0	2	8	11	−3	3	

Source: EFL.com

3 September 2019 Group stage	Exeter City	1–0	Cheltenham Town	Exeter
19:45 BST	Ajose 5'; Warren (yellow card) 32'	Report		Stadium: St James Park; Attendance: 786; Referee: Darren Drysdale

8 October 2019 Group stage	Cheltenham Town	4–3	West Ham United U21	Cheltenham
19:45 BST	Smith 25', 55', 64'; Lloyd 67'; Evans-Harriot (yellow card) 90+3'	Report	Kemp 11', 31'; Da Rosa 34' (yellow card) 47'	Stadium: Jonny-Rocks Stadium; Attendance: 1,020; Referee: Chris Sarginson

12 November 2019 Group stage	Cheltenham Town	4–7	Newport County	Cheltenham
19:45 GMT	Sheaf 17'; Lovett (yellow card) 26'; Addai (penalty missed) 34' 34'; Long 37'; Clements (yellow card) 50'; Tozer 84'	Report	Maloney 8', 45+2', 53'; Dolan 27' (pen.); Abrahams 30', 43', 68'	Stadium: Jonny-Rocks Stadium; Attendance: 774; Referee: Andy Woolmer

== Transfers ==
=== Transfers in ===
Date	Position	Nationality	Name	From	Fee	Ref.
1 July 2019	CF	(England)	Tahvon Campbell	(England) Forest Green Rovers	Free transfer	
1 July 2019	CB	(England)	Charlie Raglan	(England) Oxford United	Free transfer	
1 July 2019	CF	(England)	Reuben Reid	(England) Forest Green Rovers	Free transfer	
2 July 2019	DM	(England)	Rohan Ince	Free agent	Free transfer	
4 July 2019	CB	(Antigua and Barbuda)	Daniel Bowry	(England) Charlton Athletic	Free transfer	
3 September 2019	CF	(Bermuda)	Jonte Smith	(England) Oxford United	Free transfer	
3 January 2020	FW	(England)	Alfie May	(England) Doncaster Rovers	Undisclosed	

=== Loans in ===
Date	Position	Nationality	Name	From	Date until	Ref.
29 July 2019	CM	(England)	Max Sheaf	(England) Hull City	30 June 2020	
1 August 2019	CM	(Republic of Ireland)	Jake Doyle-Hayes	(England) Aston Villa	30 June 2020	
1 August 2019	CF	(Scotland)	Gavin Reilly	(England) Bristol Rovers	January 2020	
8 August 2019	DF	(England)	Jacob Greaves	(England) Hull City	30 June 2020	
9 January 2020	GK	(Wales)	Owen Evans	(England) Wigan Athletic	30 June 2020	
31 January 2020	CF	(England)	Tom Nichols	(England) Bristol Rovers	30 June 2020	

=== Loans out ===
Date	Position	Nationality	Name	To	Date until	Ref.
16 August 2019	DF	(England)	Grant Horton	(England) Bromsgrove Sporting	Work experience	
6 September 2019	DF	(England)	Isaac Lawrence	(England) Tuffley Rovers		
13 September 2019	DF	(England)	Grant Horton	(England) Yate Town		
10 October 2019	RM	(England)	Archie Brennan	(England) Alvechurch	November 2019	
18 October 2019	CB	(Antigua and Barbuda)	Daniel Bowry	(England) Bath City	November 2019	
25 October 2019	FW	(England)	Charlie Stanton	(England) Sutton Coldfield Town		
22 November 2019	GK	(England)	Freddie Lapworth	(England) North Leigh	December 2019	
29 November 2019	CF	(England)	Aaron Basford	(England) Evesham United	January 2020	
29 November 2019	MF	(England)	Tom Chamberlain	(England) Evesham United	January 2020	
17 December 2019	DF	(England)	Grant Horton	(England) Chippenham Town	January 2020	
28 December 2019	FW	(England)	Callum Ebanks	(England) Worcester City	January 2020	
4 January 2020	CF	(England)	Aaron Basford	(England) Cinderford Town	February 2020	
28 February 2020	RM	(England)	Archie Brennan	(England) Slimbridge	30 June 2020	

=== Transfers out ===
Date	Position	Nationality	Name	To	Fee	Ref.
1 July 2019	DM	(France)	Nigel Atangana	(England) Exeter City	Rejected contract	
1 July 2019	CF	(England)	Tyrone Barnett	(England) Eastleigh	Released	
1 July 2019	CF	(England)	Rakish Bingham	(England) Doncaster Rovers	Released	
1 July 2019	CB	(England)	Matt Bower	(England) Bath City	Released	
1 July 2019	MF	(England)	Will Dawes	Free agent	Released	
1 July 2019	RM	(Republic of Ireland)	Kevin Dawson	(England) Forest Green Rovers	Free transfer	
1 July 2019	CF	(Netherlands)	Manny Duku	(England) Torquay United	Free transfer	
1 July 2019	FW	(England)	Camden Duncan	(Wales) Merthyr Town	Released	
1 July 2019	CB	(Scotland)	Jordon Forster	(Scotland) Dundee	Rejected contract	
1 July 2019	MF	(England)	Tom Handley	Free agent	Released	
1 July 2019	CF	(Republic of Ireland)	Liam McAlinden	(England) FC Halifax Town	Mutual consent	
1 July 2019	CB	(England)	Johnny Mullins	Retired		
2 July 2019	CM	(England)	Tom Smith	(England) Bath City	Free transfer	
