= Dan Crane (footballer) =

English footballer

Personal information
- Full name: Daniel Peter Crane
- Date of birth: 27 May 1984 (age 42)
- Place of birth: Birmingham, England
- Position: Goalkeeper

Team information
- Current team: Bedworth United

Youth career
- 2002–2004: West Bromwich Albion

Senior career*
Years	Team	Apps	(Gls)
2004–2006	Burton Albion	48	(0)
2005	→ Moor Green (loan)	10	(0)
2006	Rushden & Diamonds	8	(0)
2006–2007	Lewes		
2007	Cambridge United	0	(0)
2007–2008	Corby Town		
2008–2010	Solihull Moors	56	(0)
2010–2015	Hednesford Town	209	(0)
2015	Brackley Town	13	(0)
2015–2016	Hednesford Town		
2018	Bedworth United		
2018	Bromsgrove Sporting	8	(0)
2018–2019	Alvechurch	21	(0)
2019	Gresley	2	(0)
2019–	Bedworth United	19	(0)

Managerial career
- 2019: Gresley (player-assistant manager)
- * Club domestic league appearances and goals as of 20:30, 27 January 2020 (UTC)

Daniel Peter Crane (born 27 May 1984) is an English footballer who plays as a goalkeeper for Northern Premier League Division One Midlands side Bedworth United.

== Club career ==
=== Rushden & Diamonds ===
Crane signed for League Two side Rushden & Diamonds on 7 January 2006, and made his debut in a 2–0 away defeat to Peterborough United. Crane made eight appearances for Rushden & Diamonds during the 2005–06 season, in which the club finished bottom of League Two and were relegated to the Conference, despite this Crane signed a new one-year contract with the club.

=== Bromsgrove Sporting ===
Crane signed for Southern League Division One Central side Bromsgrove Sporting on 9 October 2018.

=== Gresley ===
Crane was confirmed as player-assistant manager of Midland League Premier Division side Gresley on 21 May 2019, working alongside manager Gavin Hurren. Dan made two league appearances for Gresley, a 4–2 away defeat to Walsall Wood on 3 August 2019, and a 2–0 away defeat to Romulus on 5 August 2019. Crane departed the club in August 2019.

=== Bedworth United ===
On 27 August 2019, Crane was confirmed as re-signing for Southern League Division One Central side Bedworth United.
