= Daniel Bowry =

Antigua and Barbuda footballer (b. 1998)

Personal information
- Full name: Daniel Robert Bowry
- Date of birth: 29 April 1998 (age 28)
- Place of birth: London, England
- Height: 1.90 m (6 ft 3 in)
- Position: Defender

Team information
- Current team: Whitehawk

Youth career
- –2018: Charlton Athletic

Senior career*
Years	Team	Apps	(Gls)
2018–2019	Charlton Athletic	0	(0)
2018	→ Kingstonian (loan)	7	(0)
2018	→ Hampton & Richmond Borough (loan)	5	(0)
2019–2021	Cheltenham Town	1	(0)
2019–2020	→ Bath City (loan)	22	(0)
2021	→ Wealdstone (loan)	3	(0)
2021–2022	King's Lynn Town	21	(0)
2022–2023	Worthing	21	(1)
2023–2024	St Albans City	40	(0)
2024–2025	Cray Valley Paper Mills	30	(2)
2025	Lewes	6	(0)
2025–2026	Cray Valley Paper Mills	21	(0)
2026-	Whitehawk	12	(0)

International career^{‡}
2018–	Antigua and Barbuda	23	(1)
- * Club domestic league appearances and goals as of 19:50 24 October 2026 (UTC) ‡ National team caps and goals as of 17:30, 30 April 2025 (UTC)

Daniel Robert Bowry (born 29 April 1998) is a professional footballer who plays as a defender for Whitehawk in the Isthmian League Premier Division. Born in England, he has represented Antigua and Barbuda at international level.

== Club career ==
After joining Charlton Athletic at the age of 16, Bowry signed his first professional contract on 22 April 2016.

In April 2018, Bowry joined Kingstonian on loan until the end of the season. He made his debut for the club in a 1–0 win over Wingate & Finchley.

On 27 July 2018, Bowry joined Hampton & Richmond Borough on loan until 1 January 2019. On 19 September 2018 he was recalled from his loan.

On 4 July 2019, Bowry joined Cheltenham Town after being released by Charlton Athletic at the end of the 2018–19 season.

On 18 October, Bowry joined Bath City on an initial month's loan.

On 5 March 2021, Bowry joined National League side Wealdstone on an initial one-month loan. Bowry made his debut against FC Halifax Town on 6 March 2021, being sent off in stoppage time of that game

Following a season in the National League with King's Lynn Town in which the side were relegated, Bowry joined newly promoted National League South club Worthing on 30 July 2022. He scored his first goal for the club, after coming on as substitute against Slough Town on 29 October 2022.

In October 2025, Bowry returned to Isthmian League Premier Division club Cray Valley Paper Mills, following a short spell with Lewes, before signing for Whitehawk for the start of the 2026-27 season.

== International career ==
On 20 March 2018, Bowry was called up to the Antigua and Barbuda for a pair of friendlies against Bermuda and Jamaica. He made his debut in a 3–2 win over Bermuda on 21 March 2018.

== Personal life ==
Bowry's paternal grandfather was born in Saint Kitts and Nevis while his paternal grandmother was born in Antigua, Antigua and Barbuda. His father, Bobby Bowry, was born in England and was also a professional footballer who represented the Saint Kitts and Nevis national team.

== Career statistics ==
=== Club ===
As of match played 18 October 2025

Appearances and goals by club, season and competition
Club	Season	League			FA Cup		EFL Cup		Other		Total	
Club	Season	Division	Apps	Goals	Apps	Goals	Apps	Goals	Apps	Goals	Apps	Goals
Charlton Athletic	2017–18	League One	0	0	0	0	0	0	0	0	0	0
Charlton Athletic	2018–19	League One	0	0	0	0	0	0	0	0	0	0
Charlton Athletic	Total		0	0	0	0	0	0	0	0	0	0
Kingstonian (loan)	2017–18	Isthmian League Premier Division	7	0	0	0	—		0	0	7	0
Hampton & Richmond Borough (loan)	2018–19	National League South	5	0	0	0	—		0	0	5	0
Cheltenham Town	2019–20	League Two	1	0	0	0	1	0	2 (Note: Appearance(s) in the EFL Trophy)	0	4	0
Cheltenham Town	2020–21	League Two	0	0	0	0	0	0	4	0	4	0
Cheltenham Town	Total		1	0	0	0	1	0	6	0	8	0
Bath City (loan)	2019–20	National League South	22	0	0	0	—		3 (Note: Appearance(s) in the FA Trophy)	0	25	0
Wealdstone (loan)	2020–21	National League	3	0	0	0	—		0	0	3	0
King's Lynn Town	2021–22	National League	21	0	1	0	—		1	0	23	0
Worthing	2022–23	National League South	21	1	1	0	—		1	0	23	1
St Albans City	2023–24	National League South	32	0	0	0	—		1	0	33	0
St Albans City	2024–25	National League South	8	0	0	0	—		0	0	8	0
St Albans City	Total		40	0	0	0	0	0	1	0	41	0
Cray Valley Paper Mills	2024–25	Isthmian League Premier Division	30	2	0	0	—		2 (Note: One appearance in the Velocity Cup) (Note: One appearance in the Isthmian Premier League Play-Offs)	0	32	2
Lewes	2025–26	Isthmian League Premier Division	6	0	0	0	—		0	0	6	0
Career total			156	3	2	0	1	0	14	0	173	3

=== International ===
As of 15 October 2024

Appearances and goals by national team and year
National team	Year	Apps	Goals
Antigua and Barbuda	2018	4	0
Antigua and Barbuda	2019	4	1
Antigua and Barbuda	2020	0	0
Antigua and Barbuda	2021	2	0
Antigua and Barbuda	2022	4	0
Antigua and Barbuda	2023	5	0
Antigua and Barbuda	2024	4	0
Total		23	1

Scores and results Antigua and Barbuda's goal tally first, score column indicates score after each Bowry goal.

List of international goals scored by Daniel Bowry
No.	Date	Venue	Opponent	Score	Result	Competition	Ref.
1	18 November 2019	Ergilio Hato Stadium, Willemstad, Curaçao	Aruba	3–2	3–2	2019–20 CONCACAF Nations League B	

== Honours ==
Cheltenham Town

- League Two Champions: 2020-21
