= Chris Hussey =

English footballer (born 1989)

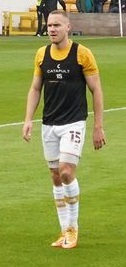
- Hussey warming up with Port Vale in 2022

Personal information
- Full name: Christopher Ian Hussey
- Date of birth: 2 January 1989 (age 37)
- Place of birth: Hammersmith, England
- Height: 5 ft 11 in (1.80 m)
- Position: Left-back

Team information
- Current team: Bromsgrove Sporting

Youth career
- Brentford
- 2005–2006: Woking
- 2006–2007: AFC Wimbledon

Senior career*
Years	Team	Apps	(Gls)
2007–2010	AFC Wimbledon	70	(3)
2007	→ Windsor & Eton (loan)	11	(0)
2009	→ Coventry City (loan)	4	(0)
2010–2013	Coventry City	54	(0)
2010	→ Crewe Alexandra (loan)	0	(0)
2013	AFC Wimbledon	19	(0)
2013–2014	Burton Albion	27	(1)
2014	→ Bury (loan)	11	(2)
2014–2016	Bury	79	(1)
2016–2018	Sheffield United	7	(0)
2017–2018	→ Swindon Town (loan)	18	(1)
2018–2022	Cheltenham Town	133	(4)
2022	Port Vale	22	(0)
2022–2023	Stockport County	30	(2)
2023	Walsall	5	(1)
2023–2025	Stratford Town	47	(1)
2025–2026	Hednesford Town	37	(1)
2026–	Bromsgrove Sporting	0	(0)

Managerial career
- 2024–2025: Stratford Town (caretaker)
- * Club domestic league appearances and goals as of 20:29, 26 April 2026 (UTC)

Christopher Ian Hussey (born 2 January 1989) is an English professional footballer who plays as a left-back for Southern League Premier Division Central club Bromsgrove Sporting.

Hussey spent his youth with Brentford and Woking before earning a professional contract with AFC Wimbledon in 2007. He spent time on loan at Windsor & Eton. He helped Wimbledon to progress from the Isthmian League Premier Division to the Conference Premier with two successive promotions. Hussey was signed by Championship club Coventry City in January 2010 and managed to become a regular starter for the team. He rejoined AFC Wimbledon in January 2013, who had by then won a place in the English Football League.

Hussey left Wimbledon and signed with Burton Albion in June 2013. He ended the 2013–14 season on loan at Bury and joined the club on a free transfer in May 2014. Hussey was promoted out of League Two with Bury in 2014–15 and was sold to League One rivals Sheffield United in June 2016. He struggled for game time in the 2016–17 title-winning season and spent the 2017–18 season in League Two on loan at Swindon Town, before he joined Cheltenham Town on a free transfer in May 2018. Hussey helped Cheltenham to reach the play-offs at the end of the 2019–20 season; they won promotion the following season as League Two champions. He was named on the EFL League Two Team of the Season for the 2020–21 season. He was sold to Port Vale in January 2022 and joined Stockport County nine months later. He signed with Walsall in June 2023, only to announce his retirement three months later. He later played non-League football for Stratford Town, becoming caretaker manager in November 2024, before he joined Hednesford Town as a player in January 2025. He won the Northern Premier League Division One West play-offs and the Premier Division play-offs with the club in 2025 and 2026, then moved on to play for Bromsgrove Sporting.

== Career ==
=== Youth career ===
Hussey was a schoolboy with Brentford and joined Woking after being released from Brentford. He was released by Woking after failing to complete his college work, later admitting he was "a bit of a problem".

=== AFC Wimbledon ===
==== Early career (2006–2008) ====
Hussey joined AFC Wimbledon as a semi-professional in 2006 and worked as a carpet fitter alongside his father. After some impressive performances for Wimbledon's under-19 and reserve teams, he signed a contract at the end of the 2006–07 season. He suffered a twisted ankle during the club's pre-season tour of summer 2007 that saw him sidelined briefly. Hussey had a short stint on loan at Windsor & Eton, where he made 11 appearances in the Southern League Division One South & West.

After returning from his loan spell, Hussey made his debut for the "Dons" in a 4–0 win at Tonbridge Angels on 14 January 2008. Manager Terry Brown initially called Hussey up to the first-team to provide cover for injuries, before he went on to establish himself as the club's first-choice left-back. He scored his first career goal on 8 March, in a 2–0 win over Hendon. He scored again on 29 March, in a 4–2 win over Horsham at Kingsmeadow. Wimbledon were promoted into the Conference South with a 2–1 victory over Staines Town in the play-off final; Hussey was an unused substitute in the game. He made a total of 15 appearances and scored two goals in the 2007–08 season.

==== Conference (2008–09) ====
Hussey started the 2008–09 season well when he scored in a 1–0 win over Braintree Town on 2 September. He continued to be in the first-team, playing in the wing-back position, and made a total of 47 appearances as Wimbledon secured a second-successive promotion into the Conference Premier. In addition to winning a second-consecutive AFC Wimbledon Young Player of the Year Award for the 2008–09 season, he was named in the Conference South All Star Team of the Year. He started every match of the 2009–10 season until his departure in October, making a total of 79 league and cup appearances for Wimbledon.

=== Coventry City ===
==== Injury struggles (2009–2011) ====
On 16 October 2009, Hussey signed a loan deal with Championship side Coventry City until January 2010. He made his Football League debut four days later, in a 2–0 defeat to Cardiff City, replacing Patrick van Aanholt as a substitute in the 68th-minute. Manager Chris Coleman praised him for his performance after the match. On 1 January 2010, the move was made permanent for an undisclosed fee, reported as between £150,000 and 200,000 he signed a contract to run until 2013. He spent most of the 2009–10 season on the bench, playing a total of eight times for the "Sky Blues".

Before the start of the 2010–11 season, Hussey suffered a foot injury during a friendly with West Bromwich Albion. Hussey remained on the sidelines until he returned to training in late-October. After returning from injury, he joined Crewe Alexandra on loan until 1 January 2011. Manager Aidy Boothroyd said that he hoped Hussey would benefit from Crewe manager Dario Gradi's vast experience. However, Hussey suffered a metatarsal injury during only his second training session at Crewe Alexandra, leading him to return to his parent club and spend three months in recovery. After returning from injury, he made his first appearance on 5 March, in a 4–1 loss against Bristol City. He was then given a handful of first-team appearances towards the end of the season, bringing Hussey's final seasonal appearance tally to 12. In the last game of the season, he set up both of Coventry's goals in a 2–2 draw with Norwich City.

==== Regular starter (2011–2013) ====
Hussey received more playing time at the start of the 2011–12 season under the management of Andy Thorn. However, in a 2–0 defeat to Barnsley on 1 October, Hussey gave away a penalty for handball and was substituted in the first half as a result. Despite this, he managed to regain his first-team place until he suffered another foot injury. After returning to the first-team, he assisted one of the goals in a 2–0 win over Portsmouth on 24 March. After returning from injury, Hussey featured in every match towards the end of the season as Coventry suffered relegation into League One. Despite struggling with injuries he made a total of 31 appearances in all competitions.

Other clubs made transfer enquiries for Hussey ahead of the 2012–13 season. He stayed at Coventry though and maintained a place in the first-team. He struggled for form, however, and was defended by manager Richard Shaw after being booed by home fans at the Ricoh Arena. Under the new management of Mark Robins though, Hussey soon lost his first-team place and was demoted to the substitute bench. Hussey's first, and only, goal for Coventry came in a 4–0 win against York City in the Football League Trophy on 9 October. His last appearance for the club came on 23 October, where he provided the assist for one of the goals in a 2–1 loss against Brentford. Hussey departed the club by mutual consent on 8 January 2013.

=== Return to AFC Wimbledon ===
On 10 January 2013, Hussey rejoined AFC Wimbledon, who had won promotion to the Football League during his absence. He made his second debut for Wimbledon on 12 January, when he came on as a second-half substitute in a 2–2 draw with Wycombe Wanderers. He soon established himself in the starting eleven and made 19 appearances in the second half of the 2012–13 season.

However, he was released in May 2013 after helping the club retain its Football League status. Shortly after his departure, Hussey said that the club released him for "footballing reasons." Manager Neal Ardley said that "he's a good player with fantastic quality... [but] I asked him to do things that didn't play to his strengths" and that "he wasn't palmed off. We said at the moment we couldn't afford him".

=== Burton Albion ===
Hussey remained in League Two after signing with Burton Albion on 27 June 2013. He started for the "Brewers" on the opening game of the new season, a 2–2 draw with Cheltenham Town. He scored his first two goals for Burton in a 2–1 League Cup win over Sheffield United on 6 August. Eleven days later, he scored again in a 3–2 win over Fleetwood Town. In a match against Premier League club Fulham at the Pirelli Stadium on 27 August, in the second round of the League Cup, he set up both of Burton's goals in a 2–2 draw; the game ended in a 5–4 penalty shoot-out defeat despite Hussey successfully converting his penalty. However, as the season progressed, he soon lost his first-team place and struggled with injuries.

Hussey left the club on loan but returned to Burton when Gary Rowett's squad was hit with injuries. He made his return in the last game of the season, in a 1–0 loss against Southend United. He featured in all three games of the League Two play-offs, including in the 1–0 defeat to Fleetwood Town in the final at Wembley Stadium. After having made a total of 36 appearances in the 2013–14 season, scoring three goals, Hussey decided to leave the club after the two parties mutually agreed to waive his contract extension for a second season.

=== Bury ===
==== League Two (2014–15) ====
On 13 March 2014, Hussey joined League Two side Bury on loan for the remainder of the 2013–14 season. He made his debut for the "Shakers" two days later in a 0–0 draw with Southend United. On 22 March, he scored his first goal at Gigg Lane, in a 1–1 draw with Dagenham & Redbridge. After setting up one of the goals in a 2–1 win over Bristol Rovers on 1 April, he scored again four days later, in a 2–0 win over Exeter City. Hussey established himself in the starting eleven at Bury, until he was recalled by Burton Albion in late-April.

Hussey joined Bury on a free transfer following his release from Burton Albion, signing a two-year contract on 30 May 2014. His first game after signing for the club on a permanent basis came on the opening game of the 2014–15 season, in a 1–0 loss to Cheltenham Town. He established himself in the left-back position despite facing competition from other full-backs. Having provided 10 assists in 42 appearances throughout the season, Hussey helped the club to secure an automatic promotion place out of League Two.

==== League One (2015–16) ====
Hussey retained his left-back spot in the starting eleven for the 2015–16 League One campaign. He set up two goals in a 3–3 draw with Crewe Alexandra on 22 August. His contribution in the first half of the season won him praise from manager David Flitcroft. Hussey started every match until he was suspended in October for being sent off after receiving two yellow cards in a 2–2 home draw with Wigan Athletic. After returning from suspension, Hussey scored his first goal of the season, in a 4–3 win over Blackpool on 31 October. Flitcroft praised Hussey for his improvement as a defender, saying it had "improved by 60%" since his arrival at the club.

In November, Hussey signed a contract extension with Bury, keeping him at the club until 2018. He provided assists against Wigan Athletic in both the League Cup and FA Cup. He remained in the left-back position throughout the season despite "struggling for form and confidence" and made a total of 50 appearances for the Greater Manchester side, scoring one goal and providing nine assists. Overall he played 103 games for Bury, scoring three goals.

=== Sheffield United ===
Hussey was sold to fellow League One club Sheffield United for an undisclosed fee on 2 June 2016. Along with Mark Duffy, Hussey was one of Chris Wilder's first two signings as manager. Hussey said the move was difficult to turn down. He made his debut for the "Blades" on the opening game of the 2016–17 season, in a 1–0 loss to Bolton Wanderers. He provided an assist for Billy Sharp in the following match against Rochdale, to give the club their first point of the season with a 1–1 draw at Bramall Lane. Hussey went on to lose his place at left-back in favour of Daniel Lafferty, and featured just seven times in the league.

==== Loan spell at Swindon Town (2017–18) ====
After being placed on a transfer list by Sheffield United, Hussey joined League Two side Swindon Town on a season-long loan on 7 July 2017. The move saw him reunited with former Bury manager David Flitcroft. He started the opening game of the 2017–18 season against Carlisle United when he set up one of the "Robins" goals in a 2–1 win. He then scored his first goal for the club on 9 September, in a 3–0 win over Luton Town. The goal was nominated for the League Two Goal of the Month award for September.

He was an ever-present in the side until he suffered a groin injury during a 2–0 win over Forest Green Rovers on 22 September. He was sidelined for six months and came back to fitness as Phil Brown was appointed to replace interim manager Matthew Taylor. On 3 May, following an alleged altercation with a fan after a defeat at Newport County, Hussey's loan spell at Swindon was terminated early and he was fined £4,000 by the FA and given a five-match suspension. He had played 20 games during his time at the County Ground. Hussey was released by Sheffield United at the end of the 2017–18 season.

=== Cheltenham Town ===
==== A strong start (2018–2020) ====
Hussey signed for Cheltenham Town on a two-year deal on 29 May 2018; manager Gary Johnson said that Hussey had "good age, good experience" and was "a good defender". Town struggled in the 2018–19 season, finishing 16th in League Two, with Hussey featuring 39 times in all competitions. He signed a contract extension in October 2019 to extend his contract until the summer of 2021. He was nominated for the League Two Player of the Month award the following February after helping the "Robins" to record six wins in seven games, and scoring a free kick in a 2–0 win at Colchester United. The goal went on to be voted as the club's goal of the season following an online poll by supporters. At the end of the 2019–20 season he helped the club reach the League Two play-offs, only to lose 3–2 on aggregate in the semi-finals against Northampton Town.

==== Promotion into League One (2020–2022) ====
In January 2021, Hussey signed a two-and-a-half-year contract extension. He was named on the Football Manager League Two Team of the Year for the 2020–21 season, along with teammate Will Boyle and manager Michael Duff. He missed just three league games during the campaign, making 48 appearances playing at left-wing-back in a 3–5–2 formation in all competitions, as Cheltenham secured promotion into League One as champions of League Two. He scored one goal, a free kick against Carlisle United that sealed an automatic promotion place. On 29 April 2021, Hussey was named in the 2020–21 EFL League Two Team of the Season at the league's annual awards ceremony.

He made 28 appearances in the first half of the 2021–22 season and picked up a man of the match award in his final game for the "Robins", in a 1–1 draw with Burton Albion at Whaddon Road. Hussey played 155 games in three and a half seasons at Cheltenham, scoring four goals. Upon leaving the club, Hussey stated: "Cheltenham is where I've enjoyed my football the most and everyone has treated me unbelievably, this is the most a club has accepted me as a person and a player and every day I gave my all".

=== Port Vale ===
On 10 January 2022, Hussey signed for League Two club Port Vale, who paid Cheltenham an undisclosed fee. Manager Darrell Clarke said: "I've always been an admirer of his work, he's a proper professional and a proper winner", whilst director of football David Flitcroft had worked with Hussey at Bury and Swindon. Hussey told supporters the following month that "it took a couple of games for me to get into a rhythm which I think is normal for a new player", before he would help his new side go unbeaten in five games. Port Vale were promoted out of the play-offs at the end of the 2021–22 season. He had his contract terminated on 1 September 2022 after finding a new club.

=== Stockport County ===
On 2 September 2022, he was announced as having signed with newly promoted League Two side Stockport County until the end of the 2022–23 season; he had scored against the club in the EFL Trophy just three days previously. Manager Dave Challinor stated that "his experience, know how and previous success in the Football League will be really important for us going forward now". He featured 36 times across the 2022–23 campaign, including three appearances in the play-offs, including the penalty shoot-out defeat to Carlisle United in the final. He was released in the summer.

=== Walsall ===
On 22 June 2023, Hussey agreed to join League Two club Walsall on a one-year deal from the expiration of his Stockport County contract. Manager Mat Sadler emphasised that personal character and playing experience were key factors in stimulating his interest in bringing Hussey to the Bescot Stadium. He was sent off in the last game of his career, having received two yellow cards in stoppage time of a 1–1 draw with Grimsby Town on 26 August. Hussey announced his retirement from football on 13 September 2023, at the age of 34, citing a wish to "pursue a new and exciting opportunity outside of the sport".

=== Stratford Town ===
On 22 September 2023, Hussey joined Southern League Premier Division Central club Stratford Town. He played 30 games in the 2023–24 campaign as the club missed out on the play-offs due to an inferior goal difference. He went on to be made a player-coach at the club. He became caretaker manager on 17 November 2024 following the departure of Gavin Hurren.

=== Hednesford Town ===
On 10 January 2025, Hussey joined Hednesford Town in the Northern Premier League Division One West after being signed by former Stratford manager Gavin Hurren for an undisclosed fee. He made 15 appearances in the second half of the 2024–25 season, including in the play-off final victory over Congleton Town at Keys Park that secured promotion. He played 31 games in the 2025–26 season, including the play-off final victory over Warrington Rylands 1906.

=== Bromsgrove Sporting ===
On 30 May 2026, Hussey signed with Southern League Premier Division Central club Bromsgrove Sporting.

== International career ==
In February 2009, Hussey was called up to the England national C team as a standby.

== Style of play ==
Hussey was a left-footed defender who could play at full-back or wing-back and could also fill in on the left-side of midfield. He always had good crossing and general attacking abilities and worked to improve his defending skills throughout his career. He was also an accomplished set-piece taker.

== Personal life ==
Hussey was described by the Coventry Telegraph as "a shy character". He worked with a clinical psychologist to overcome mental health struggles with anxiety and obsessive–compulsive disorder (OCD), which had left him addicted to sleeping tablets.

In June 2020, he graduated from Manchester Metropolitan University with a first-class honours degree in exercise and sport science. He opened a mobile app-based discount business called Local & Loyal in July 2021, which aimed to support independently owned businesses in Worcestershire and Gloucestershire.

He has two children with his fiancée Cavella Dutson.

== Career statistics ==
As of match played 21 February 2026

Appearances and goals by club, season and competition
Club	Season	League			FA Cup		League Cup		Other		Total	
Club	Season	Division	Apps	Goals	Apps	Goals	Apps	Goals	Apps	Goals	Apps	Goals
AFC Wimbledon	2007–08	Isthmian League; Premier Division	15	2	1	0	—		1 (Note: Appearance(s) in FA Trophy)	0	17	2
AFC Wimbledon	2008–09	Conference South	40	1	5	0	—		2	0	47	1
AFC Wimbledon	2009–10	Conference Premier	15	0	0	0	—		0	0	15	0
AFC Wimbledon	Total		70	3	6	0	—		3	0	79	3
Windsor & Eton (loan)	2007–08	Southern League; Division One South & West	11	0	0	0	—		0	0	11	0
Coventry City (loan)	2009–10	Championship	4	0	0	0	—		—		4	0
Coventry City	2009–10	Championship	4	0	0	0	0	0	—		4	0
Coventry City	2010–11	Championship	11	0	0	0	1	0	—		12	0
Coventry City	2011–12	Championship	29	0	1	0	1	0	—		31	0
Coventry City	2012–13	League One	10	0	0	0	2	0	2 (Note: Appearance(s) in Football League Trophy)	1	14	1
Coventry City	Total		58	0	1	0	4	0	2	1	65	1
Crewe Alexandra (loan)	2010–11	League Two	0	0	0	0	0	0	0	0	0	0
AFC Wimbledon	2012–13	League Two	19	0	—		—		—		19	0
Burton Albion	2013–14	League Two	27	1	4	0	2	2	3 (Note: Appearance(s) in League Two play-offs)	0	36	3
Bury (loan)	2013–14	League Two	11	2	—		—		—		11	2
Bury	2014–15	League Two	38	0	2	0	1	0	1	0	42	0
Bury	2015–16	League One	41	1	5	0	2	0	2	0	50	1
Bury	Total		90	3	7	0	3	0	3	0	103	3
Sheffield United	2016–17	League One	7	0	1	0	1	0	2 (Note: Appearance(s) in EFL Trophy)	0	11	0
Swindon Town (loan)	2017–18	League Two	18	1	0	0	1	0	1	0	20	1
Cheltenham Town	2018–19	League Two	34	1	3	0	0	0	2	0	39	1
Cheltenham Town	2019–20	League Two	33	2	3	0	0	0	4 (Note: Two appearances in EFL Trophy, two appearances in League Two play-offs)	0	40	2
Cheltenham Town	2020–21	League Two	43	1	3	0	2	0	0	0	48	1
Cheltenham Town	2021–22	League One	23	0	3	0	1	0	1	0	28	0
Cheltenham Town	Total		133	4	12	0	3	0	7	0	155	4
Port Vale	2021–22	League Two	19	0	0	0	0	0	0	0	19	0
Port Vale	2022–23	League One	3	0	0	0	0	0	1	1	4	1
Port Vale	Total		22	0	0	0	0	0	1	1	23	1
Stockport County	2022–23	League Two	30	2	3	1	0	0	3	0	36	3
Walsall	2023–24	League Two	5	1	0	0	1	0	0	0	6	1
Stratford Town	2023–24	Southern League; Premier Division Central	29	0	0	0	—		1	0	30	0
Stratford Town	2024–25	Southern League; Premier Division Central	18	1	0	0	—		2 (Note: One appearances in FA Trophy, one appearance in Birmingham Senior Cup)	0	20	1
Stratford Town	Total		47	1	0	0	—		3	0	50	1
Hednesford Town	2024–25	Northern Premier League; Division One West	13	1	—		—		2 (Note: Appearance(s) in play-offs)	0	15	1
Hednesford Town	2025–26	Northern Premier League; Premier Division	24	0	4	0	—		3 (Note: One appearance in FA Trophy, two appearances in play-offs)	0	31	0
Hednesford Town	Total		37	1	4	0	—		5	0	46	1
Bromsgrove Sporting	2026–27	Southern League; Premier Division Central	0	0	0	0	—		0	0	0	0
Career total			574	19	38	1	15	2	33	2	660	24

== Honours ==
AFC Wimbledon

- Conference South: 2008–09
- Isthmian League Premier Division play-offs: 2007–08

Bury

- Football League Two third-place promotion: 2014–15

Sheffield United

- EFL League One: 2016–17

Cheltenham Town

- EFL League Two: 2020–21

Hednesford Town

- Northern Premier League Division One West play-offs: 2025
- Northern Premier League Premier Division play-offs: 2026

Individual

- EFL League Two Team of the Season: 2020–21
