= Alex Addai =

English footballer

Personal information
- Full name: Alexander Sena Kudjoe Addai
- Date of birth: 20 December 1993 (age 32)
- Place of birth: Stepney, England
- Height: 1.78 m (5 ft 10 in)
- Position: Winger

Team information
- Current team: Leatherhead

Youth career
- –2010: Tottenham Hotspur
- 2010–2013: Blackpool

Senior career*
Years	Team	Apps	(Gls)
2013	Carshalton Athletic	11	(1)
2013–2014	Whitehawk	10	(2)
2014	→ Crawley Down Gatwick (loan)	4	(0)
2014–2015	Kingstonian	28	(1)
2015–2016	Grays Athletic	10	(0)
2016	→ Wingate & Finchley (loan)	15	(3)
2016–2018	Merstham	58	(12)
2018–2021	Cheltenham Town	56	(4)
2020–2021	→ Maidenhead United (loan)	5	(1)
2021	→ Solihull Moors (loan)	10	(1)
2021	Torquay United	4	(0)
2021–2022	Hemel Hempstead Town	9	(1)
2022	Kingstonian	11	(0)
2022–2023	Sittingbourne	9	(0)
2022	→ Margate (loan)	3	(0)
2022–2023	→ Faversham Town (loan)	5	(0)
2023–	Leatherhead	0	(0)
- * Club domestic league appearances and goals as of 13:57, 28 February 2023 (UTC)

Alexander Sena Kudjoe Addai (born 20 December 1993) is an English professional footballer who plays for Leatherhead as a winger.

== Club career ==
Addai started his career in the Tottenham Hotspur youth system. He joined Blackpool in 2010 and was given his first professional deal ahead of the 2012–13 season. He then played for a number of non-league sides Carshalton Athletic, Whitehawk, Crawley Down Gatwick, Kingstonian, Grays Athletic and Wingate & Finchley before joining Merstham in July 2016. In his final season at the club, Addai racked up nine goals in thirty-nine league appearances.

Addai returned to league football with a move to League Two side Cheltenham Town in May 2018, on a one-year contract. He made his professional home debut against Crawley Town, however Cheltenham lost the game 1–0. Addai played frequently throughout the season and signed a new one-year deal in April 2019, with an option for a further year that would be triggered by appearances, when then led to his contract being extended into the 2020-21 season. On 20 November 2020, Addai joined Maidenhead United on a one-month loan. In April 2021, he joined Solihull Moors on loan until the end of the season. He made 10 appearances on loan at Solihull Moors, scoring 1 goal. He was released by Cheltenham Town at the end of the season. He signed for Torquay United in September 2021. On 10 December 2021, Addai joined Hemel Hempstead Town after his short-term contract with Torquay United came to an end. On 22 February 2022, Addai returned to former club Kingstonian. In June 2022, Addai joined Sittingbourne. On 26 November 2022, Addai joined Margate on a one-month loan deal, before joining Faversham Town on loan in December. In February 2023, he joined Leatherhead.

== Personal life ==
Born in England, Addai is of Ghanaian descent.

== Career statistics ==
As of 4 July 2021

Appearances and goals by club, season and competition
Club	Season	League			FA Cup		League Cup		Other		Total	
Club	Season	Division	Apps	Goals	Apps	Goals	Apps	Goals	Apps	Goals	Apps	Goals
Carshalton Athletic	2013–14	Isthmian League Premier Division	11	1	0	0	—		0	0	11	1
Whitehawk	2013–14	Conference South	10	2	0	0	—		0	0	10	2
Crawley Down Gatwick (loan)	2013–14	Isthmian League Division One South	4	0	0	0	—		0	0	4	0
Kingstonian	2014–15	Isthmian League Premier Division	28	1	4	0	—		4 (Note: Three appearances in the Alan Turvey Trophy, one in the FA Trophy)	0	36	1
Grays Athletic	2015–16	Isthmian League Premier Division	10	0	2	1	—		6 (Note: Three appearances in the Alan Turvey Trophy, two appearances in the FA Trophy, one in the Essex Senior Cup)	1 (Note: One goal in the FA Trophy)	18	2
Wingate & Finchley (loan)	2015–16	Isthmian League Premier Division	15	3	0	0	—		0	0	15	3
Merstham	2016–17	Isthmian League Premier Division	19	3	6	1	—		6 (Note: Three appearances in the Alan Turvey Trophy, three in the FA Trophy)	0	31	4
Merstham	2017–18	Isthmian League Premier Division	39	9	0	0	—		4 (Note: Two appearances in the Alan Turvey Trophy, two in the FA Trophy)	0	43	9
Merstham	Total		68	12	8	2	0	0	16	1	92	15
Cheltenham Town	2018–19	League Two	21	0	3	2	2	0	4 (Note: Appearances in EFL Trophy)	1	30	3
Cheltenham Town	2019–20	League Two	25	4	3	2	1	0	4 (Note: Three appearances and one goal in EFL Trophy, one appearance in League Two playoffs)	1	33	7
Cheltenham Town	2020–21	League Two	10	0	3	0	2	0	3	0	18	0
Cheltenham Town	Total		56	4	9	4	5	0	11	2	81	10
Maidenhead United (loan)	2020–21	National League	5	1	0	0	0	0	1 (Note: Appearances in FA Trophy)	0	6	1
Solihull Moors (loan)	2020–21	National League	10	1	0	0	0	0	0	0	10	1
Career total			207	25	20	7	5	0	32	3	265	34
