= Max Sheaf =

English footballer

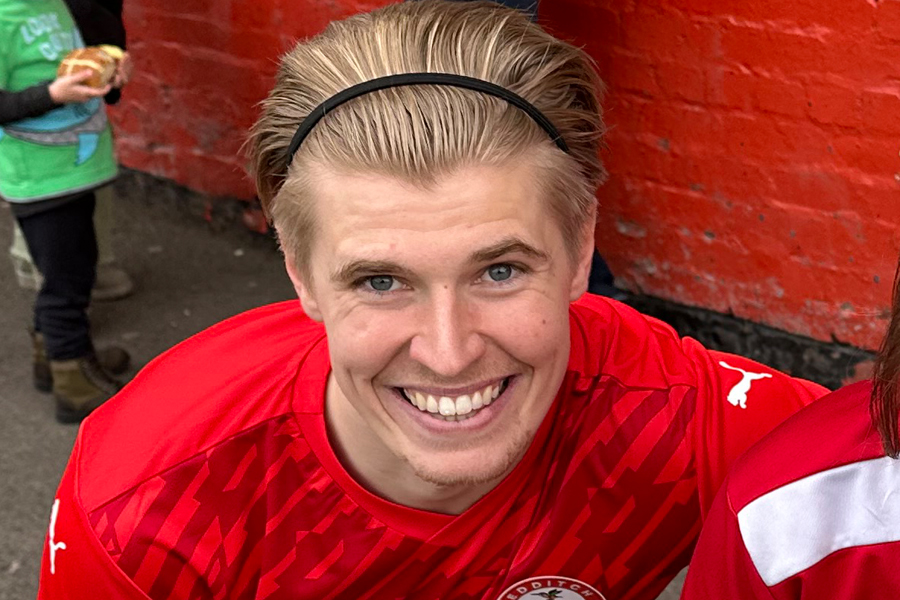
- Sheaf with Redditch United in April 2023

Personal information
- Full name: Max Daniel Sheaf
- Date of birth: 10 March 2000 (age 26)
- Place of birth: Gravesend, Kent, England
- Position: Midfielder

Team information
- Current team: Eastbourne Borough
- Number: 8

Senior career*
Years	Team	Apps	(Gls)
2018–2021	Hull City	1	(0)
2019–2020	→ Cheltenham Town (loan)	19	(2)
2021	→ Torquay United (loan)	3	(0)
2021–2022	Gloucester City	19	(0)
2022	→ Hungerford Town (loan)	7	(0)
2022–2023	Redditch United	42	(7)
2023–2025	Ross County	14	(0)
2025	Gateshead	13	(0)
2025–2026	Hednesford Town	18	(1)
2026–	Eastbourne Borough	15	(0)
- * Club domestic league appearances and goals as of 23:31, 21 November 2026 (UTC)

Max Daniel Sheaf (born 10 March 2000) is an English footballer who plays as a midfielder for Isthmian League Premier Division club Eastbourne Borough.

== Career ==
Born in Gravesend, he made his league debut in the final match of the 2018–19 season when he came on in the 54th-minute as a substitute for Fraizer Campbell against Bristol City.

On 29 July 2019, Sheaf joined Cheltenham Town on loan until January 2020. He made his debut for the Robins in the first match of the 2019–20 season playing 75 mins in a 1–0 loss to Leyton Orient. He scored his first professional in an EFL Trophy tie against Newport County on 12 November 2019.

Sheaf's loan at Cheltenham was extended until the end of the season on 8 January 2020.

On 18 January 2021, Sheaf joined National League side Torquay United on loan for the remainder of the 2020–21 season.

Sheaf was released by Hull City at the end of the 2020–21 season.

On 27 August 2021, Sheaf signed a one-year contract with Gloucester City. He was released at the end of the 2021–22 season.

On 18 February 2022, Sheaf was sent on a month-long loan spell to Hungerford Town.

On 5 August 2022, Redditch United announced the signing of Sheaf on a free transfer following his release from Gloucester City.

Sheaf joined Scottish Premiership side Ross County on 28 June 2023 on a two-year deal after County paid an undisclosed fee to Redditch United.

On 10 January 2025, Sheaf joined National League side Gateshead on an eighteen-month deal.

In October 2025, Sheaf joined Northern Premier League Premier Division club Hednesford Town.

On 31 May 2026, Sheaf was announced as a new signing for Eastbourne Borough following their relegation from the National League South.

== Personal life ==
Sheaf's older brother Ben is also a footballer. He went to The Anthony Roper Primary School, then moved on to Wilmington Grammar School for Boys in 2011.

== Career statistics ==
As of match played 21 November 2026

Appearances and goals by club, season and competition
Club	Season	League			FA Cup		League Cup		Other		Total	
Club	Season	Division	Apps	Goals	Apps	Goals	Apps	Goals	Apps	Goals	Apps	Goals
Hull City	2018–19	Championship	1	0	1	0	1	0	0	0	3	0
Hull City	2019–20	Championship	0	0	0	0	0	0	0	0	0	0
Hull City	2020–21	League One	0	0	0	0	0	0	3 (Note: Appearance(s) in EFL Trophy)	0	3	0
Hull City	Total		1	0	1	0	1	0	3	0	6	0
Cheltenham Town (loan)	2019–20	League Two	19	2	2	0	0	0	1	1	22	3
Torquay United (loan)	2020–21	National League	3	0	—		—		2 (Note: Appearance(s) in FA Trophy)	0	5	0
Gloucester City	2021–22	National League North	19	0	2	0	—		2	1	23	1
Hungerford Town (loan)	2021–22	National League South	7	0	—		—		0	0	7	0
Redditch United	2022–23	SFL Premier Division Central	42	7	3	0	—		9 (Note: Three appearances and one goal in FA Trophy, three appearances in Birmingham Senior Cup, three appearance in Worcestershire Senior Cup)	1	54	8
Ross County	2023–24	Scottish Premiership	14	0	—		3	0	1 (Note: Appearance(s) in Scottish Cup)	0	18	0
Ross County	2024–25	Scottish Premiership	0	0	—		0	0	0	0	0	0
Ross County	Total		14	0	0	0	3	0	1	0	18	0
Gateshead	2024–25	National League	6	0	—		—		0	0	6	0
Gateshead	2025–26	National League	7	0	0	0	—		1 (Note: Appearance(s) in National League Cup)	0	8	0
Gateshead	Total		13	0	0	0	0	0	1	0	14	0
Hednesford Town	2025–26	NPL Premier Division	18	1	—		—		3 (Note: One appearance in Northern Premier League Premier Division playoffs, two appearances in Birmingham Senior Cup)	0	21	1
Eastbourne Borough	2026–27	IL Premier Division	15	0	4	0	—		5 (Note: Three appearances and one goal in FA Trophy, two appearances and one goal in Sussex Senior Cup)	2	24	2
Career total			151	10	12	0	4	0	27	5	194	15
