= Alfie May =

English footballer (born 1993)

Personal information
- Full name: Alfie Ben May
- Date of birth: 3 July 1993 (age 33)
- Place of birth: Gravesend, England
- Height: 5 ft 9 in (1.76 m)
- Position: Striker

Team information
- Current team: Doncaster Rovers (on loan from Huddersfield Town)
- Number: 10

Youth career
- Millwall

Senior career*
Years	Team	Apps	(Gls)
2012–2013	Corinthian		
2013	Billericay Town	2	(0)
2013–2014	Chatham Town	19	(9)
2014	→ Bromley (dual registration)	0	(0)
2014	VCD Athletic	14	(2)
2014–2015	Erith & Belvedere	45	(38)
2014	→ Farnborough (loan)	2	(0)
2015–2017	Hythe Town	45	(37)
2017–2020	Doncaster Rovers	92	(10)
2020–2023	Cheltenham Town	141	(58)
2023–2024	Charlton Athletic	43	(23)
2024–2025	Birmingham City	44	(16)
2025–	Huddersfield Town	34	(7)
2026–	→ Doncaster Rovers (loan)	13	(2)
- * Club domestic league appearances and goals as of 13:21, 22 November 2026 (UTC)

Alfie Ben May (born 3 July 1993) is an English professional footballer who plays as a striker for Doncaster Rovers, on loan from EFL League One club Huddersfield Town.

After playing in non-League with Corinthian, Billericay Town, Chatham Town, Bromley, VCD Athletic, Erith & Belvedere, Farnborough and Hythe Town, May turned professional in 2017 with Doncaster Rovers, later also playing in the Football League for Cheltenham Town, Charlton Athletic, and Birmingham City, with whom he won the EFL League One title.

== Career ==
=== Early career ===
Born in Gravesend, May began his career in the youth team at Millwall where he stayed from age 9 until 14, being released due to his size. He began his senior career with Corinthian, then Billericay Town and Chatham Town, before joining Bromley on a dual-registration basis in January 2014. After a spell with VCD Athletic, May signed for Erith & Belvedere in August 2014. After a trial at League One club Crewe Alexandra in September 2014, May signed for Farnborough in October 2014. He left the club after just two weeks. After returning to previous club Erith & Belvedere, he moved to Hythe Town in October 2015. In September 2016, his manager said he was good enough to play in the Football League, and he had a trial with League Two club Stevenage in October 2016.

=== Doncaster Rovers ===
After the club made an approach for him, May turned professional with Doncaster Rovers (also in League Two) in January 2017, signing a 2 1/2-year contract. May made his debut for Doncaster on 14 January 2017, coming on as a substitute against Barnet. He scored his first professional goal on 18 February 2017, in a 1–1 home draw with Luton Town. Doncaster Rovers went on to secure automatic promotion from League Two at the end of the 2016–17 season, finishing third in the table. The club narrowly missed out on the league title, finishing just one point behind champions Portsmouth, having been in contention for first place until the final day of the season.

On 20 November 2018, May scored four goals in a 7–0 victory over Chorley in an FA Cup first-round replay, his first professional hat-trick. Doncaster Rovers finished sixth in League One, qualifying for the play-offs. May featured throughout the campaign as Rovers pushed for a second successive promotion. Doncaster faced Charlton Athletic in the semi-finals, where they were eliminated over two legs, ending the club’s promotion bid. Despite the disappointment, the season marked one of Doncaster’s strongest League One finishes during May’s time at the club.

In January 2020, May left Doncaster to join Cheltenham Town, ending a three-year spell at the club. Across his spell at Doncaster Rovers, May made over 117 appearances in all competitions, scoring 23 goals.

=== Cheltenham Town ===
On 3 January 2020, May signed for Cheltenham Town on a two-and-a-half-year contract for an undisclosed fee. On 19 February 2022, May scored four goals against Wycombe Wanderers in a match that would end 5–5; May scored the equalising goal to share the points. May was awarded the EFL League One Player of the Month award for February 2022 after scoring eight goals in six matches across the month. He was voted Cheltenham Town Supporters' Player of the Year for the 2021–22 season.

He won the League One Player of the Month award for a second time for March 2023 having scored five goals and registered an assist, including a strike from his own half against Peterborough United. May became Cheltenham's highest EFL goalscorer with a goal in a win against Cambridge United in September 2022. May was voted Cheltenham's Player of the Year for the second consecutive season. At the end of the 2022–23 season, May left Cheltenham having scored 67 times in 165 games.

=== Charlton Athletic ===
On 7 July 2023, May joined Charlton Athletic on a two-year contract with the option to extend for a further 12 months. Charlton paid Cheltenham a reported fee in the region of £250,000. On the same day, Charlton announced that May would wear the number nine shirt for the 2023–24 season. Having scored seven goals in six league matches, he was awarded the League One Player of the Month award for October 2023. In November 2023, May told Sky Sports it was his intention to score more league goals than Premier League Golden Boot holder Erling Haaland, after May brought his goal tally to one behind Haaland's at the same point in the season. He would go on to overtake Haaland's league goal tally in December. On 29 February 2024, May was voted EFL Player of the Year at the 2024 London Football Awards. May was named in the EFL League One Team of the Season at the 2024 EFL Awards that took place on 14 April 2024. His 23 league goals also saw him pick up the League One Golden Boot. He was voted PFA League One Player of the Year and was named in the PFA League One Team of the Year, as well as being awarded Charlton's Player of the Year with 82% of fans’ votes.

=== Birmingham City ===
On 2 July 2024, May joined Birmingham City on a three-year contract for an undisclosed fee. He stated he left Charlton as he wanted to move closer to his family. He made his debut in the starting eleven for the opening fixture of the season, at home to Reading; with little time remaining and Birmingham trailing 1–0, Emil Hansson's cross was handled by an opponent and May tied the scores from the resultant penalty. He went on to score in each of his next three league matches.

=== Huddersfield Town ===
On 22 July 2025, May signed for EFL League One club Huddersfield Town for an undisclosed fee. On 2 August 2025, May scored on his Huddersfield Town debut, scoring a penalty in a 3–0 victory over Leyton Orient.

==== Doncaster Rovers (loan) ====
On 19 June 2026, May returned to EFL League One club Doncaster Rovers on a season-long loan. After six years away from Doncaster, May scored against Stockport County on his second debut for the club in a EFL Cup first round match on 8 August 2026, with Doncaster winning on penalties after a 1–1 draw. On 5 September 2026, May scored his first league goal for Doncaster since his return to the club, with a penalty in a 3–2 defeat to Plymouth Argyle.

== Career statistics ==
As of match played 21 November 2026

Appearances and goals by club, season and competition
Club	Season	League			FA Cup		EFL Cup		Other		Total	
Club	Season	Division	Apps	Goals	Apps	Goals	Apps	Goals	Apps	Goals	Apps	Goals
Billericay Town	2012–13	Conference South	2	0	0	0	–		0	0	2	0
Chatham Town	2013–14	Isthmian League Division One North	19	9	4	2	–		6 (Note: Three appearances in FA Trophy, three appearances and six goals in Alan Turvey Trophy)	6	29	17
VCD Athletic	2013–14	Isthmian League Division One North	14	2	0	0	–		0	0	14	2
Erith & Belvedere	2014–15	Southern Counties East League	36	34	0	0	–		2	1	38	35
Erith & Belvedere	2015–16	Southern Counties East League	9	4	0	0	–		0	0	9	4
Erith & Belvedere	Total		45	38	0	0	0	0	2	1	47	39
Farnborough (loan)	2014–15	Conference South	2	0	0	0	–		0	0	2	0
Hythe Town	2015–16	Isthmian League Division One South	23	19	0	0	–		2 (Note: One appearance in FA Trophy, one appearance in Isthmian League play-offs)	0	25	19
Hythe Town	2016–17	Isthmian League Division One South	22	18	4	1	–		4 (Note: Appearance(s) in FA Trophy)	5	30	24
Hythe Town	Total		45	37	4	1	0	0	6	5	55	43
Doncaster Rovers	2016–17	League Two	16	3	0	0	0	0	0	0	16	3
Doncaster Rovers	2017–18	League One	27	4	1	0	3	2	0	0	31	6
Doncaster Rovers	2018–19	League One	34	2	6	4	2	1	5 (Note: Three appearances and four goals in EFL Trophy, two appearances in League One play-offs)	4	47	11
Doncaster Rovers	2019–20	League One	15	1	3	0	1	0	4 (Note: Appearances in EFL Trophy)	2	23	3
Doncaster Rovers	Total		92	10	10	4	6	3	9	6	117	23
Cheltenham Town	2019–20	League Two	12	6	0	0	0	0	2 (Note: Appearances in League Two play-offs)	0	14	6
Cheltenham Town	2020–21	League Two	44	9	4	4	2	0	2	0	52	13
Cheltenham Town	2021–22	League One	46	23	3	1	3	2	1	0	53	26
Cheltenham Town	2022–23	League One	39	20	1	0	1	0	5	2	46	22
Cheltenham Town	Total		141	58	8	6	5	2	10	2	165	67
Charlton Athletic	2023–24	League One	43	23	3	2	1	0	3	2	50	27
Birmingham City	2024–25	League One	44	16	3	0	2	0	8	1	57	17
Huddersfield Town	2025–26	League One	34	7	0	0	2	0	4	0	40	7
Huddersfield Town	2026–27	League One	0	0	0	0	0	0	0	0	0	0
Huddersfield Town	Total		34	7	0	0	2	0	4	0	40	7
Doncaster Rovers (loan)	2026–27	League One	13	2	1	0	2	1	1	1	17	4
Career total			494	202	33	14	19	6	49	24	595	246

== Honours ==
Doncaster Rovers

- EFL League Two third-place promotion: 2016–17

Cheltenham Town

- EFL League Two: 2020–21

Birmingham City

- EFL League One: 2024–25
- EFL Trophy runner-up: 2024–25

Individual

- EFL League One Player of the Month: February 2022, March 2023, October 2023
- Cheltenham Town Players' Player of the Year: 2021–22, 2022–23
- Cheltenham Town Supporters' Player of the Year: 2021–22, 2022–23
- EFL League One Team of the Season: 2023–24
- EFL League One Golden Boot: 2023–24
- Charlton Athletic Player of the Year: 2023–24
- PFA League One Player of the Year: 2023–24
- PFA Team of the Year: 2023–24 League One
- London Football Awards EFL Player of the Year: 2024
