= Luke Varney =

English footballer (born 1982)

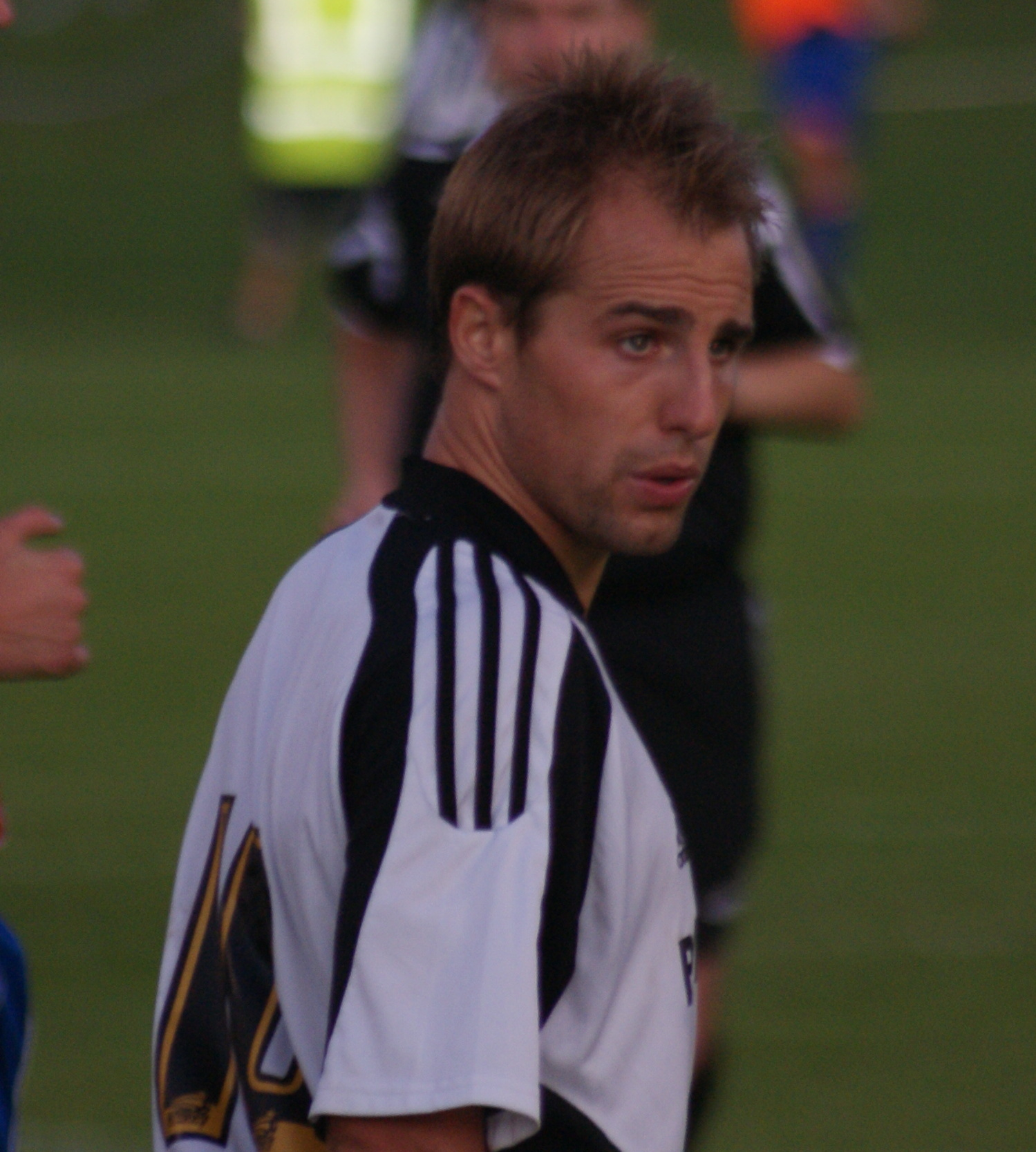
- Varney playing for Derby County in 2009

Personal information
- Full name: Luke Ivan Varney
- Date of birth: 28 September 1982 (age 44)
- Place of birth: Leicester, England
- Height: 5 ft 11 in (1.80 m)
- Positions: Forward; winger

Youth career
- Quorn

Senior career*
Years	Team	Apps	(Gls)
2000–2003	Quorn		
2003–2007	Crewe Alexandra	95	(27)
2007–2009	Charlton Athletic	57	(10)
2008–2009	→ Derby County (loan)	7	(1)
2009–2011	Derby County	5	(0)
2009	→ Sheffield Wednesday (loan)	4	(2)
2009–2010	→ Sheffield Wednesday (loan)	19	(4)
2010	→ Sheffield Wednesday (loan)	20	(5)
2010–2011	→ Blackpool (loan)	30	(5)
2011–2012	Portsmouth	30	(6)
2012–2014	Leeds United	45	(6)
2014	→ Blackburn Rovers (loan)	12	(0)
2014–2015	Blackburn Rovers	11	(0)
2015	→ Ipswich Town (loan)	10	(1)
2015–2016	→ Ipswich Town (loan)	18	(1)
2016–2017	Ipswich Town	15	(3)
2017–2018	Burton Albion	33	(1)
2018–2020	Cheltenham Town	56	(21)
2020–2021	Burton Albion	4	(0)
2021	Quorn	9	(0)
Total		480	(93)
- * Club domestic league appearances and goals

Luke Ivan Varney (born 28 September 1982) is an English former professional footballer who played as a striker. Across his career he had spells with 11 different teams.

He began his career with non-League club Quorn, a club in his home county of Leicestershire, before moving to league football with Crewe Alexandra. His performances during Crewe's 2006–07 campaign, where he was named in the League One "Team of the Year" despite Crewe's finishing only mid-table and scoring against Manchester United in the League Cup saw him come to the attentions of bigger clubs and consecutive £1m-plus transfers to the Championship followed, as he joined Charlton Athletic and then Derby County. He had made over 200 league appearances, and scored his 50th career league goal, and career first top-flight goal, in the Premier League, with a 76th-minute strike against Fulham on his debut for Blackpool.

== Career ==
=== Crewe Alexandra ===
Varney was born in Leicester and played for Leicester youth up front and began his career as a semi-professional footballer at non-league level with Quorn before being spotted by Crewe's scout Darryl Finney. The Englishman signed for the Railwaymen in 2003 and spent four years at the club, appearing in 95 league games and scoring 27 goals. Varney signed for Crewe Alexandra from non-league Quorn in 2003 for £50,000. Varney's deal also had a 20% sell-on clause with the Leicestershire club. Whilst at Quorn, he worked as a quality controller at a factory. Varney made his Crewe debut five months later in a 3–1 away defeat to Wimbledon. The young Englishman also managed to get his first goal for the club four games after his debut in Crewe's 3–1 away win over Crystal Palace, Dean Ashton scoring the other two goals for The Railwaymen. Unfortunately, Varney picked up a shoulder injury during January 2004, denying him a chance of making any further appearances during the rest of the 2003–04 season.

Varney recovered from his injury in time for the following season, making 26 appearances for Crewe, scoring four goals in those appearances. The striker also picked up two yellow cards during the course of the year. He became more involved in the first team during the 2004–05 season, making 27 appearances and scoring five goals.

In 2006, Crewe Alexandra were relegated to League One. Varney would make his name during the 2006–07 season, scoring 25 goals in all competitions during the season, which saw the Englishman take the honour of the League's third top goalscorer. Varney also formed a notable partnership with Nicky Maynard, as the two became League One's most productive partnership, scoring a total of 44 goals between them.

However, it was Varney's performance against Manchester United in the League Cup that gained attention from the bigger clubs as during the weeks following the game, which saw Varney score the goal that forced extra time, FA Premier League clubs such as Portsmouth were reported to be interested in signing him. On the contrary, however, Varney himself played down any talk of him moving clubs. Varney's season however was cut short in March 2007 after breaking his toe in Crewe's 1–1 draw with Brighton & Hove Albion.

=== Charlton Athletic ===
Varney completed a move to Charlton Athletic for £2 million in May 2007 with a percentage of the fee going to Quorn, rising to £2.5 million depending on appearances. Charlton manager Alan Pardew commented that "Luke is an exciting young player and perfectly fits the mould of a Charlton player". "The deal was done very quickly" Dario Gradi recalled, "Alan [Pardew] rang me out of the blue really and asked me about Luke. It was a surprise because I had no indication that they were interested before. I said what we wanted for him and then we discussed his strengths and his weaknesses" he added. Varney's first goal for the Addicks came against Leicester City in September 2007, the club he had supported as a boy. Varney scored eight goals in 39 league appearances. In the 2008–09 season, Varney made a further 18 league appearances, scoring twice, joining Derby County on loan.

=== Derby County ===
He signed for Derby County on loan on 27 November 2008 with a view to a £1m transfer in January 2009. On 6 December he scored on his home debut for Derby in a match against Crystal Palace. The move became permanent in January 2009 for a fee of just over £1 million. After suffering from various niggling injuries, illness and a loss of form, Varney joined Sheffield Wednesday on a month's loan on 20 March 2009. Varney made four appearances at Wednesday, scoring two goals – a brace against Southampton. He returned to Derby on 21 April 2009, saying that "The loan was enjoyable and now I'm fit and ready to put my all into the last few games with Derby. It feels like a fresh start, a clean slate. When you go out on loan you do think "am I needed here [at Derby]?", but the manager said I was 100% in his plans for next season. It has been an unsettling season as a whole coming from Charlton, the quick change of manager at Derby, and the injuries and illness. But I wish the season was not about to end because I've come into a bit of form and I'm enjoying my football." He rejoined Sheffield Wednesday on a four-month loan on 21 August 2009. On his return to Derby he hinted at a return to Sheffield Wednesday either on loan or permanently, Sheffield Wednesday caretaker manager Sean Mcauley also hinted at this. New permanent Wednesday manager Alan Irvine signed Varney on loan for the remainder of the season on 21 January 2010. Despite Varney's goals he was unable to prevent Sheffield Wednesday slipping to relegation on the final day of the 2009–10 season and returned to Derby his future still very much up in the air.

Prior to the 2010–11 season, Varney was linked with a move to Southampton but remained at Derby and played a part in the club's pre-season preparations, albeit often employed out of position at right back. When employed up front, he put in a Man of the Match display during Derby's 3–1 Bass Charity Vase, scoring twice. Despite this, he was still linked with a move away from the club, with Queens Park Rangers and Crewe Alexandra amongst those expressing an interest before he made a surprise return to the Derby side with his first Derby appearance since 18 August 2010, and his first start since May 2009, in a 1–2 defeat to Cardiff City on 14 August 2010, in which he provided Tomasz Cywka for the Derby goal.

==== Blackpool (loan) ====
On 27 August 2010, Varney joined newly promoted Premier League club Blackpool on a season-long loan with a view to a permanent deal in the region of £500,000. The following day he scored on his debut in the Seasiders' first Premier League match at Bloomfield Road, a 2–2 draw with Fulham. He scored his second league goal on 3 October 2010 as Blackpool defeated Liverpool 2–1 at Anfield with Varney's first half goal proving to be the winner, In a performance which saw him named in the week seven 2010–11 Premier League Team of the Week, alongside teammate Charlie Adam. In November, after Varney scored four times in his opening 11 appearances, Blackpool confirmed their desire to sign Varney on a permanent deal in the January 2011 transfer window. Manager Ian Holloway claimed that Blackpool had a "massive clause" in the loan deal which meant they could sign Varney for just £250,000 in the January 2011 transfer window, though Derby denied this saying Varney could be sold to any club and that no deal is in place with Blackpool.

Varney scored his fifth for the club with the second in a 2–2 draw at Bolton Wanderers on 22 November 2010 before embarking on a fifteen match goalless run which saw him dropped to the bench for the 1–1 draw at home to Newcastle United on 23 April 2011. After appearing as a substitute versus Newcastle, and the following game against Stoke City, Varney made just one appearance in the remaining three games of the campaign, coming on for the last 15 minutes in a 4–2 defeat against Manchester United which confirmed Blackpool's relegation from the Premier League after one season. Varney ended the season with five goals from 30 appearances, but enduring an 18-game goalless streak.

=== Portsmouth ===
After lengthy speculation, it was confirmed on 6 July 2011, that Varney would join Portsmouth for a fee of £750,000. Varney scored his first league goal for Portsmouth on 6 August 2011 against Middlesbrough. He then scored his second goal for the club in a 4–3 away defeat to West Ham, deflecting in off Carlton Cole, after he volleyed Liam Lawrence's corner. He was then moved up front in a 4–4–2 formation after the departure of Steve Cotterill, where scored three goals in three games, once in a televised home 2–0 victory over Barnsley, and then a brace, again at home, in a 3–1 victory over Doncaster.

=== Leeds United ===
After a number of weeks of rumours his signing for Leeds United was confirmed by manager, Neil Warnock on 23 July 2012.

Varney scored his first Leeds United goal in his debut against Bodmin Town to make it 1–0 to Leeds and the game finished 4–0. Varney was allocated the number 11 shirt for the 2012–13 season on 3 August.

Varney made one and scored one in his competitive debut for Leeds in the first game of the season against Shrewsbury Town in the League Cup on 11 August. Varney made his league debut for Leeds in their 1–0 victory against Wolverhampton Wanderers. In Leeds' 3–0 League Cup win against Southampton, Varney was famous for a miss which was described by Neil Warnock as 'miss of the century', when he missed a wide open goal from 2–3 yards out. Warnock later apologised for coming across "as a dinosaur, although I'm not sure which one."

Varney was sent off for a deliberate elbow against Millwall on 18 November. Varney scored his second goal for Leeds in their 2–1 victory over Tottenham Hotspur in the Fourth Round of the FA Cup in January.

Varney scored in consecutive games against two of his former clubs, scoring a goal in a 2–1 loss to Charlton Athletic before following it up with a brace against Sheffield Wednesday in Brian McDermott's first game in charge in a 2–1 win on 13 April.

Following Leeds 1–1 draw with Ipswich on 28 January 2014, then Leeds manager Brian McDermott revealed that Varney had refused to play for Leeds for the game, due to an offer coming in from league rivals Blackburn and him not wanting to get injured.

On 8 February 2014, Varney joined Blackburn Rovers on loan until 11 May 2014 with a view to a permanent move. On 16 May 2014, Varney was released by Leeds United.

=== Blackburn Rovers ===
On 1 July 2014, Varney signed a one-year deal with former loan club Blackburn Rovers after his release from Leeds United.

=== Ipswich Town ===
On 20 February 2015, Varney joined Ipswich Town on loan for an initial one-month period with the option to extend this loan until the end of the season, having made 11 appearances for Blackburn Rovers, all from the bench.

He was injured in the Playoff Semi-Final game against Norwich City but remained at the club before signing permanently in December 2015, taking the number 42 shirt. Varney went on to make 18 appearances for Ipswich in the Championship in 2015–16, most as a substitute. He scored once, a last-minute winner in his final game for the club, a 3–2 home win over MK Dons on 30 April 2016.

He signed a new contract in August 2016 as cover for the injured Brett Pitman. His contract with Ipswich was cancelled in January 2017, allowing him to join Burton Albion.

=== Burton Albion ===
Varney scored his first goal for Burton in a 1–1 draw with Barnsley on 29 April 2017. He was released by the club at the end of the 2017–18 season, following their relegation.

=== Cheltenham Town ===
Varney joined League Two side Cheltenham Town on 28 September 2018 after appearing on trial and scoring in a reserve team friendly against Hartpury College a few days earlier. Varney made his Cheltenham Town debut as a sub against Lincoln City on 29 September 2018.

Despite scoring 7 goals in 23 games across the 2019–20 season, he was released by Cheltenham Town at the end of the season.

=== Return to Burton Albion ===
On 12 August 2020, he returned to Burton Albion as a player-fitness coach on a one-year deal. On 12 May 2021 it was announced that he would be one of 12 players leaving Burton at the end of the season.

=== Return to Quorn ===
On 23 June 2021, Quorn announced that he had re-signed for the club he began his career at.

In November 2021, having made nine league appearances on his return to Quorn, he announced his retirement from his playing career, aged 39.

== Controversy ==
Ian Holloway criticised him for a dive in a game between Crystal Palace and Leeds United in the 2012–13 season, stating in a post-match interview: "He got a booking for a complete waste-of-time of a dive and he was laughing about it but he basically tried to get a penalty and that ain't funny". Playing for Blackburn Rovers against Leeds in the 2014–15 season, Varney dived to win a penalty that proved to be decisive in the match. The decision was called a "joke" by Leeds manager Neil Redfearn. Varney has also been accused of diving by Gus Poyet in a game between Brighton and Hove Albion and Leeds in the 2012–13 season.

== Career statistics ==
As of match played 7 November 2021

Appearances and goals by club, season and competition
Club	Season	League			FA Cup		League Cup		Other		Total	
Club	Season	Division	Apps	Goals	Apps	Goals	Apps	Goals	Apps	Goals	Apps	Goals
Crewe Alexandra	2003–04	First Division	8	1	1	0	1	0	—		10	1
Crewe Alexandra	2004–05	Championship	26	4	1	0	0	0	—		27	4
Crewe Alexandra	2005–06	Championship	27	5	1	0	1	0	—		29	5
Crewe Alexandra	2006–07	League One	34	17	0	0	3	1	5 (Note: Appearances in Football League Trophy)	7	42	25
Crewe Alexandra	Total		95	27	3	0	5	1	5	7	108	35
Charlton Athletic	2007–08	Championship	39	8	2	0	1	0	—		42	8
Charlton Athletic	2008–09	Championship	18	2	0	0	1	0	—		19	2
Charlton Athletic	Total		57	10	2	0	2	0	0	0	61	10
Derby County (loan)	2008–09	Championship	7	1	0	0	0	0	—		7	1
Derby County	2008–09	Championship	3	0	2	0	0	0	—		5	0
Derby County	2009–10	Championship	1	0	0	0	1	0	—		2	0
Derby County	2010–11	Championship	1	0	0	0	0	0	—		1	0
Derby County	Total		12	1	2	0	1	0	0	0	15	1
Sheffield Wednesday (loan)	2008–09	Championship	4	2	0	0	0	0	—		4	2
Sheffield Wednesday (loan)	2009–10	Championship	39	9	0	0	0	0	—		39	9
Sheffield Wednesday (loan)	Total		43	11	0	0	0	0	0	0	43	11
Blackpool (loan)	2010–11	Premier League	30	5	0	0	0	0	—		30	5
Portsmouth	2011–12	Championship	30	6	0	0	1	0	—		31	6
Leeds United	2012–13	Championship	34	4	3	1	2	1	—		39	6
Leeds United	2013–14	Championship	11	2	0	0	0	0	—		11	2
Leeds United	Total		45	6	3	1	2	1	0	0	50	8
Blackburn Rovers (loan)	2013–14	Championship	12	0	0	0	0	0	—		12	0
Blackburn Rovers	2014–15	Championship	11	0	2	0	1	0	—		14	0
Blackburn Rovers	Total		23	0	2	0	1	0	0	0	26	0
Ipswich Town	2014–15	Championship	10	1	0	0	0	0	1	0	11	1
Ipswich Town	2015–16	Championship	18	1	2	0	0	0	—		20	1
Ipswich Town	2016–17	Championship	15	3	0	0	0	0	—		15	3
Ipswich Town	Total		43	5	2	0	0	0	1	0	46	5
Burton Albion	2016–17	Championship	15	1	1	0	0	0	—		16	1
Burton Albion	2017–18	Championship	18	0	0	0	2	1	—		20	1
Burton Albion	Total		33	1	1	0	2	1	0	0	36	2
Cheltenham Town	2018–19	League Two	35	14	3	0	0	0	1 (Note: Appearance in EFL Trophy)	0	39	14
Cheltenham Town	2019–20	League Two	21	7	1	0	1	0	0	0	23	7
Cheltenham Town	Total		56	21	4	0	1	0	1	0	62	21
Burton Albion	2020–21	League One	4	0	0	0	0	0	0	0	4	0
Quorn	2021–22	United Counties League Premier Division	9	0	0	0	—		0	0	9	0
Career total			480	93	19	1	15	3	7	7	521	104

== Honours ==
Individual

- PFA Team of the Year: 2006–07 League One
- Crewe Alexandra Fans' Player of the Year: 2006–07
- Cheltenham Town Player of the Year: 2018–19
