= Ryan Broom =

Welsh footballer (born 1996)

Personal information
- Full name: Ryan James Broom
- Date of birth: 4 September 1996 (age 30)
- Place of birth: Newport, Wales
- Height: 1.77 m (5 ft 10 in)
- Positions: Right midfielder; right winger

Team information
- Current team: Cheltenham Town
- Number: 14

Youth career
- 2013–2015: Bristol Rovers

Senior career*
Years	Team	Apps	(Gls)
2015–2018	Bristol Rovers	9	(0)
2015–2016	→ Taunton Town (loan)	8	(4)
2016	→ Bath City (loan)	6	(1)
2018	→ Eastleigh (loan)	13	(3)
2018–2020	Cheltenham Town	73	(10)
2020–2022	Peterborough United	15	(1)
2021	→ Burton Albion (loan)	11	(2)
2021–2022	→ Plymouth Argyle (loan)	43	(4)
2022–2023	Cheltenham Town	40	(2)
2023–2025	Fleetwood Town	63	(4)
2025–	Cheltenham Town	42	(2)
- * Club domestic league appearances and goals as of 16:13, 15 November 2026 (UTC)

Ryan James Broom (born 4 September 1996) is a Welsh professional footballer who plays as a right midfielder or right winger for EFL League Two club Cheltenham Town.

== Playing career ==
=== Bristol Rovers ===
Broom graduated from Bristol Rovers' youth set-up in 2015 and made his professional football debut in August 2015 as a second-half substitute during a League Cup defeat to Birmingham City. On 19 March 2016 he made his Football League debut as a second-half substitute against his home town club and local rivals Newport County which Rovers won 4–1. He scored his first goals for Bristol Rovers when he scored twice in an EFL Trophy tie against Wycombe Wanderers on 29 August 2017.

On 7 October 2016, Broom joined Bath City on a one-month loan. He made his debut for the club the following day where he scored in a 1–1 draw with Eastbourne Borough.

He was released by Bristol Rovers at the end of the 2017–18 season.

=== Cheltenham Town ===
On 18 May 2018, Broom joined League Two side Cheltenham Town on a one-year deal. On 17 May 2019, after making 48 appearances in his debut season with the club, Broom signed a new two-year contract with the club. The 2019–20 season ended in disappointment for the club when they lost in the play-offs semi-final to eventual winners Northampton Town. After winning the first leg 2–0 away from home, a 3–0 home defeat saw Cheltenham knocked out. On a personal level, Broom won three awards in the club's end of season awards, winning the Mira Showers' Player of the Year, Norwegian Robins' Player of the Year and Players' Player of the Year.

=== Peterborough United ===
On 24 August 2020, Broom joined League One club Peterborough United for an undisclosed fee, signing a three-year deal. On 5 September 2020, Broom made his Peterborough debut against former club Cheltenham as his former club knocked his new team out of the EFL Cup. His first goal for the club came when he scored the third goal in a 3–1 victory over Swindon Town just 4 minutes after coming off of the bench.

==== Burton Albion (loan) ====
On 1 February 2021, Broom joined League One side Burton Albion on loan for the remainder of the 2020–21 season. His first goal came on 17 April 2021, a 90+3 minute equaliser against Plymouth Argyle.

==== Plymouth Argyle (loan) ====
On 29 July 2021, Broom joined League One side Plymouth Argyle on loan for the 2021–22 season with a view to a permanent move. However, despite a successful period on loan, a fee for a permanent transfer could not be agreed between the two clubs..

=== Cheltenham Town return ===
On 1 September 2022 Broom returned to League One side Cheltenham Town signing a one-year deal. He was offered a new contract at the end of the 2022–23 season.

=== Fleetwood Town ===
On 26 June 2023, Broom signed for League One club Fleetwood Town on a two-year deal having rejected the offer of a new contract at Cheltenham.

=== Third spell at Cheltenham Town ===
On 25 July 2025, Broom returned for a third spell at Cheltenham Town after his Fleetwood contract expired, signing a one-year contract.

== Career statistics ==
As of match played 14 November 2026

Appearances and goals by club, season and competition
Club	Season	League			FA Cup		League Cup		Other		Total	
Club	Season	Division	Apps	Goals	Apps	Goals	Apps	Goals	Apps	Goals	Apps	Goals
Bristol Rovers	2015–16	League Two	1	0	0	0	1	0	0	0	2	0
Bristol Rovers	2016–17	League One	5	0	0	0	0	0	0	0	5	0
Bristol Rovers	2017–18	League One	3	0	0	0	1	0	2 (Note: Appearance(s) in EFL Trophy)	2	6	2
Bristol Rovers	Total		9	0	0	0	2	0	2	2	13	2
Bath City (loan)	2016–17	National League South	6	1	0	0	—		0	0	6	1
Eastleigh	2017–18	National League	13	3	0	0	—		0	0	13	3
Cheltenham Town	2018–19	League Two	39	2	3	0	2	1	4	1	48	4
Cheltenham Town	2019–20	League Two	34	8	3	0	0	0	3 (Note: One appearance in EFL Trophy and two appearances in League Two play-offs)	0	40	8
Cheltenham Town	Total		73	10	6	0	2	1	7	1	88	12
Peterborough United	2020–21	League One	15	1	2	0	1	0	0	0	18	1
Peterborough United	2021–22	League One	0	0	0	0	0	0	0	0	0	0
Peterborough United	Total		15	1	2	0	1	0	0	0	18	1
Burton Albion (loan)	2020–21	League One	11	2	0	0	0	0	0	0	11	2
Plymouth Argyle (loan)	2021–22	League One	43	4	4	0	1	0	0	0	48	4
Cheltenham Town	2022–23	League One	40	2	1	0	0	0	5	3	46	5
Fleetwood Town	2023–24	League One	36	2	2	0	1	0	4	2	43	4
Fleetwood Town	2024–25	League Two	27	2	1	0	3	0	3	0	34	2
Fleetwood Town	Total		63	4	3	0	4	0	7	2	77	6
Cheltenham Town	2025–26	League Two	30	0	2	0	2	1	2	0	36	1
Cheltenham Town	2026–27	League Two	12	2	0	0	1	0	2	0	15	2
Cheltenham Town	Total		42	2	2	0	3	1	4	0	51	3
Career total			315	29	18	0	13	2	25	8	371	39
