= Bromsgrove Sporting F.C. =

Association football club in Bromsgrove, England

Coordinates: 52.3396°N 2.0564°W

Bromsgrove Sporting
- Full name: Bromsgrove Sporting Football Club
- Nickname: The Rouslers
- Founded: 2009; 17 years ago
- Ground: Victoria Ground
- Capacity: 3,500
- Owner: Bromsgrove Sporting Ltd
- Chairman: Rod Brown
- Manager: Tim Flowers
- League: Southern League Premier Division Central
- 2025–26: Southern League Premier Division Central, 18th of 22
- Website: bromsgrovesporting.co.uk
Home colours	Away colours

Bromsgrove Sporting Football Club is a football club based in Bromsgrove, Worcestershire, England. The club was founded in 2009 and played their first season, 2010–11, in Midland Football Combination Division Two, where they ended third. The club currently play in the Southern League Premier Division Central.

== History ==
Bromsgrove Sporting club was founded in 2009 as a supporters consortium with the plan to buy Bromsgrove Rovers, and to take that football club out of administration. The supporters trust had become dissatisfied with the ownership and chairmanship of Tom Herbert, who had taken the club into administration. The administrator identified and preferred another potential buyer for the Rovers club (who it had been suggested had links to Tom Herbert, and who subsequently failed to pay the agreed purchase money and was later made bankrupt by the administrator). The consortium took it upon themselves to create a team to safeguard non-league football in Bromsgrove. On 2 June 2010 Sporting were offered the lease of the Victoria Ground, after they had promised to make the ground available for Bromsgrove Rovers fixtures too. In August 2010, Bromsgrove Rovers were expelled from the Southern League, despite Sporting agreeing to make the Victoria Ground available, and the Rovers club was subsequently dissolved. Bromsgrove Sporting thus inherited sole use of the Victoria Ground.

After high finishes in their first few seasons, and league re-organisations which led to their elevation from Midland Football Combination Division Two and Division One, for season 2012–13 Bromsgrove Sporting were promoted to the Midland Football Combination Premier Division.

On 10 May 2014, in front of a crowd of 414 at the Victoria Ground, Bromsgrove, Sporting's first team lifted their first piece of silverware, recording a 4–1 victory over Paget Rangers in the final of the Smedley Crooke Memorial Charity Cup with goals by Danny Ludlow (2) & Billy Russell (2).

As of the 2014-15 season, the league was rebranded Midland Football League (MFL) after the Midland Football Combination merged with the Midland Alliance. Sporting played that season in the First Division of the MFL.

Bromsgrove gained a reputation for being the perennial bridesmaids, finishing second for three consecutive years prior to the 2016–17 season, in a league that offers just the one promotion place. However, the 2016–17 season saw the club finish as champions and thus gaining promotion to the MFL Premier Division at last, becoming 'invincibles' in the process as the side remained unbeaten in the league. Sporting also reached the semi-finals of the F.A. Vase, before being edged out 2–1 on aggregate by Cleethorpes Town one game from Wembley. The 2017–18 season saw Sporting become champions of the MFL Premier Division at their first attempt, thus achieving back to back promotions and securing a place in the Southern League Division One Central for the 2018-19 season. The club also won The Worcestershire FA Senior Urn for the second successive season.

The 2018-19 season saw The Rouslers finish in second place behind Peterborough Sports, but after winning the Division One Central Play-Off semi-final against Sutton Coldfield Town 3-2 AET and the final against Corby Town 4-3 AET in front of a crowd of 2,943 at the Victoria Ground, Sporting were once again promoted, to the Southern League Premier Central Division, for the 2019-20 season. The Southern League curtailed fixtures for that season following the outbreak of the Covid-19 pandemic in March 2020. Sporting were in fourth place in the Division at that point, with ten matches remaining unplayed. The 2020-21 season was also curtailed, after just eight league matches, for the same reason. However, Sporting did manage to secure the Red Recruitment Trophy, a one-off local initiative played between Worcestershire-based Non-League Step 3 teams, beating Alvechurch 1-0 in the final in May 2021.

The 2021-22 season (the club's 12th season and the first completed in full after the lifting of pandemic restrictions) saw a dramatic reversal in Sporting's fortunes on the field. Mixed results in the team's Southern League matches saw them in eleventh position by mid-October. However, a heavy home defeat by National League Grimsby Town in a televised FA Cup 4th qualifying round fixture was followed by a run of adverse league results such that, by mid-March 2022, after a home defeat by Biggleswade Town, Sporting slid into the relegation zone - something never experienced before by a club used to continued success on the field. The team rallied, however, and gained enough points in subsequent matches to move to safety, finishing the league season in 18th position. Some 40 different players had turned out for the club at some point during the season, with an almost constant turnover in playing personnel.

The following season, in 2022–23, saw early departures from the cup competitions, and the club focussed on the minimum objective of consolidating its position at Step 3 Southern League Premier level in the non-league pyramid. Mixed league results saw Sporting handily placed in eighth position in the table by the halfway point in the season, but only four wins in the remaining 21 fixtures led to Sporting gradually sliding down the table. Despite finishing nine points above the relegation places, the club occupied 18th position after the last match, the same position as the previous season. It was a similar story too in terms of constant turnover in players, some 38 making at least one appearance in the team during the season. Several young loanees from EFL clubs featured in various league matches, but were generally unable to improve the team's results.

In January 2024, Tim Flowers took interim charge of the club as first team manager securing their status in the league. The club formally announced the return of Paul Smith as first team manager for the 2024/25 campaign, but was replaced midway through by Scott Adey Linforth. Scott secured step 3 status for the club along with overseeing Sporting reach their highest league position and points tally for a season.

== Attendances ==
Being the in-spirit replacement of Bromsgrove Rovers, Sporting had a much higher average attendance than the other teams in the Midland Football League. Their inaugural season had a home average attendance of 293 and their average for 2016–17 was 671. This increased again in 2017–18 (league and cup combined) to 721.

Sporting's record home attendance was on 11 March 2017 where 3,349 attended the FA Vase Semi-final first leg match against Cleethorpes Town. The return leg a week later at Cleethorpes attracted a crowd of 1,154. Sporting's record home league attendance at the Victoria Ground to date was on 11 January 2020 when a crowd of 1,764 saw them beat Tamworth 1–0 in a Southern League Premier Central Division fixture. An away fixture in the MFL against ground tenants Worcester City on 26 December 2017 (also played at the Victoria Ground) attracted 1,672 fans. As mentioned above, although not strictly a 'home' fixture the Southern League Division One Central play-off final on 6 May 2019 attracted 2,943 supporters to the Victoria Ground. Before the Cleethorpes FA Vase match the best attended match Sporting had been involved in away from the Victoria Ground was 550 in the final of the Les James Challenge Cup on 6 May 2015 at the Bescot Stadium, where they beat Southam United 3–2, with "The Rouslers" taking approximately 450 fans to Walsall.. In 2017–18, the Worcestershire FA Senior Urn final against Lye Town at Kidderminster's Aggborough Stadium, won by Bromsgrove on penalties, attracted 642 spectators.

In the 2016–17 season, Sporting played at Step Six of the non-league pyramid, and had the highest average league attendance of any team at that level in the country. This achievement was repeated in 2017–18 at pyramid Step Five level with home league attendances averaging 777, and again in 2018-19 at Step Four level with home league gates averaging 952 (boosted to 1,090 with the inclusion of the play-off games), making Bromsgrove Sporting the 43rd best-supported team in non-League football. In the curtailed 2019-20 season at Step Three level (Southern League Premier Central Division), Sporting's 17 home league matches attracted an average of 979 supporters.

Despite the team's adverse results, the completed 2021-22 season saw only a modest reduction in home attendances, with the 27 league and cup matches at the Victoria Ground attracting an average of 849 supporters. The highest attendance was 3,219 for the televised FA Cup match against Grimsby Town. The continuing trend in adverse results in the 2022-23 season did however see a notable decline in home attendances, with the 21 league matches at the Victoria Ground averaging just 636, the lowest for some seasons. Ten defeats in those 21 matches seemed to be an influencing factor.

== Players ==
=== Current squad ===
As of 7 November 2026

Position	Nation	Player
GK	ENG	Tony Breeden
GK	BER	Dale Eve
DF	ENG	Josh Dugmore
DF	ENG	Brad Bood
DF	ENG	Chris Hussey
DF	ENG	Ollie Harrison
DF	WAL	Kieron Freeman
DF	IRL	Jaden Charles
DF	ENG	Hayden Reeves
DF	ENG	Jak Hickman
MF	ENG	Simeon Maye
MF	ENG	Billy Shaw
MF	ENG	Daniel Trickett-Smith
MF	AUS	Jordan Lyden
MF	ENG	Joe Doyle-Charles
MF	GAM	Lamin Barrow
FW	ENG	Jake Jervis
FW	JAM	Jamille Matt
FW	ENG	Jermaine Hylton

The Southern Football League does not use a squad numbering system.

== Management and coaching staff ==
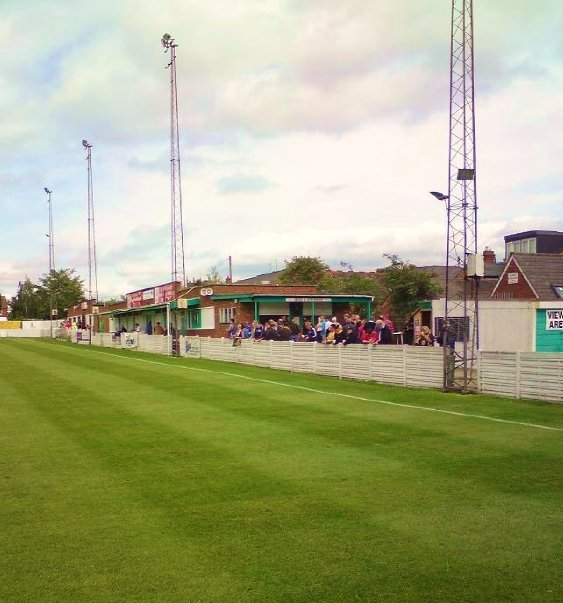
Victoria Ground clubhouse

=== Club Officials ===
As of 3 August 2025

Position	Name
Chairman	Rod Brown
Football Secretary	Dave Stephens
Vice Chairman	Graham Scott
President	Jeff Rea
Operations Director	Simon Cadwallader
Joint Commercial Manager	Joe Amess
Maintenance	David Sheppard
Director of Football	Iain Queen
Matchday Operations/Safety & Security Director	Rob McLaren
Residents	Benito Di Luca
Head of Media	Max Banner, Chris “Concept man” Jepson
Head of Commercial & Hospitality	Anita Gemmell

=== Staff ===
As of 24 August 2026

Position	Name
Manager	Tim Flowers
Assistant Manager	Leon Broadhurst
Goalkeeping Coach	Dan Price
Coach	Gary Whild
First Team Analyst	Kevin Bunting
Sports Therapist	Auz Shah
Kit Manager	Dean Ashford

=== Managerial history ===
Period	Manager
2010	(England) Myles Day
2010–2011	(England) Stewart Brighton
2011–2013	(England) Keith Draper
2013	(England) Graham Scott
2013–2014	(England) Adrian Mander
2014	(England) Graham Scott (Caretaker Manager)
2014–2018	(England) Paul Smith
2018–2021	(Republic of Ireland) Brendan Kelly
2021–2022	(England) Gavin Hurren
2022	(England) Thomas Baillie
2022–2024	(England) Michael McGrath
2024	(England) Tim Flowers (Interim Manager)
2024	(England) Paul Smith
2024-2025	(England) Scott Adey-Linforth
2025–	(England) Tim Flowers

== Records ==
- Best FA Cup performance: 4th qualifying round (2021–22)
- Best FA Trophy performance: Third round (2026–27)
- Best FA Vase performance: Semi-finals (2016–17)

== Seasons ==
Season	∆	Division	Pos	P	W	D	L	F	A	GD	Pts	FA Cup	FA Vase/Trophy	Other Cups	Notes	Manager
2010–11	12	Midland Football Combination Division 2	3rd	30	20	4	6	82	27	+55	64			R1 R1 R2	Inaugural season. Promoted to Division 1 after League reorganisation	Myles Day / Stewart Brighton
2011–12	11	Midland Football Combination Division 1	3rd	34	19	8	7	94	44	+50	65			R2 Final R2 SF R2	Promoted to Premier Division after League reorganisation	Stewart Brighton / Keith Draper
2012–13	10	Midland Football Combination Premier Division	6th	34	18	6	10	73	54	+19	57			R3 SF R3 SF		Keith Draper / Graham Scott
2013–14	10	Midland Football Combination Premier Division	2nd	34	23	3	8	92	35	+57	72		R1	SF SF Won		Graham Scott / Adrian Mander
2014–15	10	Midland Football League Division 1	2nd	38	27	5	6	121	41	+80	86	PR	R3	Won R2 R1		Adrian Mander / Paul Smith
2015–16	10	Midland Football League Division 1	2nd	38	29	4	5	102	41	+61	91	PR	R1	R2 Final Final		Paul Smith
2016–17	10	Midland Football League Division 1	1st	38	33	5	0	132	23	+109	104	PR	SF	R1 Won SF	Promoted to Midland Football League Premier Division	Paul Smith
2017–18	9	Midland Football League Premier	1st	42	31	5	6	110	50	+60	98	PR	R5	R2 R3 Won	Promoted to Southern Football League Division One Central	Paul Smith / Brendan Kelly
2018–19	8	Southern Division One Central	2nd	38	27	6	5	108	44	+64	87	PR	R5 EPR	SF R1	Promoted to Southern Football League Premier Division	Brendan Kelly
2019–20	7	Premier Division Central	4th	32	17	6	9	80	43	+37	57	QR1	QR1	R2 SF	Southern Football League Premier Division	Brendan Kelly
2020–21	7	Premier Division Central	n/a	8	2	2	4	9	17	-8	8		W	The 2020/21 season was officially ended on 19 March 2021, with the last matches being played on Wednesday 4 November 2020 due to the Coronavirus pandemic.	Southern Football League Premier Division	Brendan Kelly
2021–22	7	Premier Division Central	18th	40	10	12	18	36	59	-23	42	QR4	R1	R3 QF	Southern Football League Premier Division	Brendan Kelly / Gavin Hurren
2022–23	7	Premier Division Central	18th	42	13	9	20	58	78	-20	48	QR2	QR3	QF	Southern Football League Premier Division	Thomas Baillie / Michael McGrath
2023–24	7	Premier Division Central	17th	40	12	8	20	44	51	-7	44	QR3	QR3	QF	Southern Football League Premier Division	Michael McGrath / Tim Flowers / Paul Smith
2024–25	7	Premier Division Central	14th	42	15	6	21	57	61	-4	44	QR3	QR3	SF	Southern Football League Premier Division	Paul Smith / Scott Adey-Linforth
2025–26	7	Premier Division Central	18th	42	12	8	22	52	73	-21	44	QR1	R1	SF	Southern Football League Premier Division	Scott Adey-Linforth / Tim Flowers

== See also ==
- Bromsgrove Sporting F.C. players
- List of fan-owned sports teams
