= Tom Chamberlain (footballer, born 2002) =

English footballer

Personal information
- Full name: Thomas Jack Chamberlain
- Date of birth: 1 June 2002 (age 24)
- Place of birth: Cheltenham, England
- Height: 6 ft 2 in (1.87 m)
- Position: Midfielder

Team information
- Current team: Stratford Town

Youth career
- Leckhampton Rovers
- 2009–2019: Cheltenham Town

Senior career*
Years	Team	Apps	(Gls)
2019–2021	Cheltenham Town	0	(0)
2019	→ Worcester City (loan)		
2019	→ Evesham United (loan)		
2020	→ Alvechurch (loan)		
2021–2022	Evesham United		
2022–	Stratford Town		
- * Club domestic league appearances and goals as of 20:00, 9 December 2019 (UTC)

Thomas Jack Chamberlain (born 1 June 2002) is an English professional footballer who plays as a midfielder for Stratford Town.

== Career ==
Born in Cheltenham, Chamberlain joined hometown club Cheltenham Town in 2009 from local club Leckhampton Rovers. Following a loan at Worcester City in the second half of the 2018–19 season, Chamberlain made his Cheltenham debut on 3 September 2019 in a 1–0 EFL Trophy defeat against Exeter City. Chamberlain subsequently became the club's second youngest player in Cheltenham's Football League era, falling short of Kyle Haynes' record by ten days. On 29 November 2019 it was announced that Chamberlain would join Evesham United on loan along with fellow academy graduate Aaron Basford.

In the summer of 2020 he signed his first professional contract to become a member of the first team squad at Cheltenham Town. In the early part of the 2020-21 season he joined Alvechurch on loan in the Southern Premier Central Division.

He was released by Cheltenham at the end of the club's 2020-21 League Two title victory.

In August 2021, he joined Southern League Division One South side Evesham United. In March 2022 he stepped up a level to sign for Southern Premier Central side Stratford Town.

== Honours ==
=== Cheltenham Town ===
- League Two Champions: 2020-21
