= 2023–24 Cheltenham Town F.C. season =

137th season in existence of Cheltenham Town FC

Cheltenham Town
2023–24 season
- Chairman: David Bloxham
- Head Coach: Wade Elliott (until 20 September); Kevin Russell (caretaker); Darrell Clarke (from 29 September)
- Stadium: Whaddon Road
- League One: 21st (relegated)
- FA Cup: First round
- EFL Cup: First round
- EFL Trophy: Group stage

The 2023–24 season was the 137th season in the history of Cheltenham Town and their third consecutive season in League One. The club participated in League One, the FA Cup, the EFL Cup, and the 2023–24 EFL Trophy.

== Current squad ==
As of 16 March 2024

No.	Name	Position	Nationality	Place of birth	Date of birth (age)	Previous club	Date signed	Fee	Contract end
Goalkeepers
1	Luke Southwood	GK	(Northern Ireland)	(England) Oxford	6 December 1997 (age 28)	Reading	11 July 2023	Free	30 June 2024
21	Jamie Pardington	GK	(England)		20 July 2000 (age 26)	(Northern Ireland) Larne	1 July 2023	Free	30 June 2024
31	Jude Franks	GK	(England)			Academy	5 September 2023	Trainee	30 June 2024
Defenders
2	Sean Long	RB	(Republic of Ireland)	Dublin	2 May 1995 (age 31)	Lincoln City	1 July 2018	Free	30 June 2024
3	Ben Williams	LB	(Wales)	(England) Preston	31 March 1999 (age 27)	Barnsley	5 January 2022	Undisclosed	30 June 2024
4	Tom Bradbury	CB	(England)	Aylesbury	27 February 1998 (age 28)	FC Halifax Town	1 July 2022	Free	30 June 2024
5	Andy Smith	CB	(England)	Banbury	11 September 2001 (age 25)	Hull City	24 January 2024	Loan	31 May 2024
6	Lewis Freestone	CB	(England)	King's Lynn	26 October 1999 (age 27)	Brighton & Hove Albion	1 August 2020	Free	30 June 2025
14	Jack Shepherd	CB	(England)		6 March 2001 (age 25)	Barnsley	1 February 2024	Loan	31 May 2024
24	Grant Horton	CB	(England)	Colchester	13 September 2001 (age 25)	Academy	5 August 2020	Trainee	30 June 2024
33	Curtis Davies	CB	(England)	Leytonstone	15 March 1985 (age 41)	Derby County	1 July 2023	Free	30 June 2024
40	Cameron Walters	CB	(England)		9 October 2006 (age 20)	Academy	6 November 2023	Trainee	30 June 2024
Midfielders
7	Liam Kinsella	DM	(Republic of Ireland)	(England) Colchester	23 February 1996 (age 30)	Swindon Town	24 January 2024	Free	30 June 2025
8	Liam Sercombe	CM	(England)	Exeter	25 April 1990 (age 36)	Bristol Rovers	4 August 2020	Free	30 June 2024
15	Will Ferry	LM	(Republic of Ireland)	(England) Bury	7 December 2000 (age 25)	Southampton	9 August 2022	Undisclosed	30 June 2024
17	James Olayinka	CM	(England)	Lambeth	5 October 2000 (age 26)	Arsenal	1 September 2022	Undisclosed	30 June 2024
23	Elliot Bonds	CM	(Guyana)	(England) Brent	23 March 2000 (age 26)	Hull City	1 July 2021	Free	30 June 2025
25	Josh Harrop	AM	(England)	Stockport	15 December 1995 (age 30)	Northampton Town	22 January 2024	Free	30 June 2024
29	Tom King	CM	(England)		20 September 2006 (age 20)	Academy	1 July 2023	Trainee	30 June 2026
30	Freddy Willcox	CM	(England)		11 December 2005 (age 20)	Academy	5 September 2023	Trainee	30 June 2024
32	Greg Sloggett	CM	(Republic of Ireland)	Gormanston	3 July 1996 (age 30)	(Republic of Ireland) Dundalk	2 February 2024	Free	30 June 2024
34	Tom Pett	CM	(England)	Potters Bar	3 December 1991 (age 34)	Port Vale	2 November 2023	Free	30 June 2024
35	Brandon Liggett	CM	(England)		6 June 2006 (age 20)	Academy	6 November 2023	Trainee	30 June 2024
Forwards
9	Matty Taylor	CF	(England)	Kidlington	30 March 1990 (age 36)	Forest Green Rovers	1 February 2024	Free	30 June 2026
10	Aidan Keena	CF	(Republic of Ireland)	Mullingar	25 April 1999 (age 27)	(Republic of Ireland) Sligo Rovers	29 January 2023	£80,000	30 June 2026
11	Rob Street	CF	(England)	Oxford	26 September 2001 (age 25)	Crystal Palace	1 July 2023	Free	30 June 2026
19	George Lloyd	CF	(England)	Gloucester	11 February 2000 (age 26)	Academy	1 July 2018	Trainee	30 June 2024
26	Joe Nuttall	CF	(England)	Bury	27 January 1997 (age 29)	Oldham Athletic	1 February 2024	Loan	31 May 2024
27	Jordan Thomas	CF	(England)		2 May 2001 (age 25)	Bath City	1 February 2024	Undisclosed	30 June 2026
39	Sopuruchukwu Obieri	CF	(England)			Academy	6 November 2023	Trainee	30 June 2024
Out on Loan
16	Daniel Adshead	CM	(England)	Manchester	2 September 2001 (age 25)	Norwich City	1 July 2022	Undisclosed	30 June 2024
20	Max Harris	GK	(England)	Gloucester	14 September 1999 (age 27)	Oxford United	3 September 2020	Free	30 June 2024
22	Liam Smith	RB	(Scotland)	Dalgety Bay	10 April 1996 (age 30)	(Scotland) Dundee United	20 July 2023	Free	30 June 2024
28	Adulai Sambu	RB	(Portugal)	(Portugal) Lisbon	28 June 2004 (age 22)	Academy	1 July 2022	Trainee	30 June 2024

== Transfers ==
=== In ===
Date	Pos	Player	Transferred from	Fee	Ref
1 July 2023	CB	Curtis Davies (ENG)	Derby County (ENG)	Free transfer	
1 July 2023	GK	Jamie Pardington (ENG)	Larne (NIR)	Free transfer	
1 July 2023	CF	Rob Street (ENG)	Crystal Palace (ENG)	Free transfer	
11 July 2023	GK	Luke Southwood (NIR)	Reading (ENG)	Free transfer	
20 July 2023	RB	Liam Smith (SCO)	Dundee United (SCO)	Free transfer	
3 August 2023	CM	Curtis Thompson (ENG)	Wycombe Wanderers (ENG)	Free transfer	
2 November 2023	CM	Tom Pett (ENG)	Free agent	—N/a	
22 January 2024	AM	Josh Harrop (ENG)	Free agent	—N/a	
24 January 2024	DM	Liam Kinsella (IRL)	Swindon Town (ENG)	Free transfer	
1 February 2024	CF	Matty Taylor (ENG)	Forest Green Rovers (ENG)	Free transfer	
1 February 2024	RW	Jordan Thomas (ENG)	Bath City (ENG)	Undisclosed	
2 February 2024	CM	Gregory Sloggett (IRL)	Dundalk (IRL)	Free transfer	

=== Out ===
Date	Pos	Player	Transferred to	Fee	Ref
16 May 2023	LB	Reece Hutchinson (ENG)	Sligo Rovers (IRL)	Undisclosed	
30 June 2023	DM	Dylan Barkers (ENG)	Hereford (ENG)	Released	
30 June 2023	RM	Ryan Broom (WAL)	Fleetwood Town (ENG)	Free transfer	
30 June 2023	CF	Charlie Brown (ENG)	Morecambe (ENG)	Released	
30 June 2023	CF	Callum Ebanks (ENG)	Free agent	Released	
30 June 2023	CF	Zac Guinan (ENG)	Free agent	Released	
30 June 2023	RB	Ryan Jackson (ENG)	Sutton United (ENG)	Rejected Contract	
30 June 2023	GK	Shaun MacDonald (ENG)	Exeter City (ENG)	Released	
30 June 2023	CF	Christian Norton (ENG)	Free agent	Released	
30 June 2023	CB	Charlie Raglan (ENG)	Oldham Athletic (ENG)	Mutual Consent	
7 July 2023	CF	Alfie May (ENG)	Charlton Athletic (ENG)	Undisclosed	
19 January 2024	CF	Will Goodwin (ENG)	Oxford United (ENG)	Undisclosed	
1 February 2024	CM	Curtis Thompson (ENG)	Grimsby Town (ENG)	Free transfer	
14 February 2024	CB	Grant Horton (ENG)	Waterford (IRL)	Free transfer	
15 February 2024	CM	Ellis Chapman (ENG)	Sligo Rovers (IRL)	Free transfer	

=== Loaned in ===
Date	Pos	Player	Loaned from	Until	Ref
1 August 2023	CM	Oliver Hammond (WAL)	Nottingham Forest (ENG)	2 January 2024 (Note: On 2 January, Hammond returned to Nottingham Forest early.)	
18 August 2023	RB	Luciano D'Auria-Henry (ENG)	Fulham (ENG)	2 January 2024 (Note: On 2 January, D'Auria-Henry returned to Fulham early.)	
25 August 2023	CB	Owen Bevan (WAL)	Bournemouth (ENG)	2 January 2024 (Note: On 2 January, Bevan returned to Bournemouth early due to injury.)	
29 August 2023	AM	Cameron Peupion (AUS)	Brighton & Hove Albion (ENG)	2 January 2024 (Note: On 2 January, Peupion returned to Brighton early.)	
1 September 2023	CF	Nathan Butler-Oyedeji (ENG)	Arsenal (ENG)	1 February 2024 (Note: On 1 February, Butler-Oyedeji returned to Arsenal early.)	
1 September 2023	CF	Jovan Malcolm (ENG)	West Bromwich Albion (ENG)	2 January 2024 (Note: On 2 January, Malcolm returned to West Bromwich Albion early.)	
1 September 2023	RB	Josh Williams (ENG)	Birmingham City (ENG)	1 January 2024	
24 January 2024	CB	Andy Smith (ENG)	Hull City (ENG)	End of season	
1 February 2024	CF	Joe Nuttall (ENG)	Oldham Athletic (ENG)	End of season	
1 February 2024	CB	Jack Shepherd (ENG)	Barnsley (ENG)	End of season	

=== Loaned out ===
Date	Pos	Player	Loaned to	Until	Ref
18 August 2023	GK	Jamie Pardington (ENG)	Truro City (ENG)	15 September 2023	
12 September 2023	RB	Adulai Sambu (POR)	Hungerford Town (ENG)	End of Season (Note: On 4 December, Sambu's loan at Hungerford was extended until the end of the season.)	
1 December 2023	GK	Max Harris (ENG)	Weston-super-Mare (ENG)	End of season	
16 December 2023	CM	Daniel Adshead (ENG)	AFC Fylde (ENG)	End of Season (Note: On 30 January, Adshead's loan at Fylde was extended until the end of season.)	
1 January 2024	CM	Ellis Chapman (ENG)	Sligo Rovers (IRL)	15 February 2024 (Note: On 15 February, Chapman's loan at Sligo ended early and joined then permanently.)	
1 February 2024	RB	Liam Smith (SCO)	Grimsby Town (ENG)	End of season	

== Pre-season and friendlies ==
On 19 May, Cheltenham Town announced their first batch of pre-season friendlies, against Evesham United, Swindon Supermarine, Weston-super-Mare and Bristol City. A fifth friendly fixture was later added, against Birmingham City. The club announced a sixth friendly on June 12, against West Bromwich Albion.

Win Draw Loss Fixtures

8 July 2023 Friendly	Evesham United	2–4	Cheltenham Town	Evesham
15:00 BST	Steele 16'; Walters 45+1' (o.g.)	Report	Walters 21'; Sercombe 22', 34'; Freestone 66'	Stadium: The Spiers & Hartwell Stadium; Attendance: 710; Referee: Neil Pratt

11 July 2023 Friendly	Swindon Supermarine	0–6	Cheltenham Town	South Marston
19:45 BST		Report	Willcox 15', 24'; Ferry 23'; Horton 40'; King 62'; Olayinka 67'	Stadium: Hunts Copse; Attendance: 269; Referee: Mitchell Terry

15 July 2023 Friendly	Weston-super-Mare	1–2	Cheltenham Town	Weston-super-Mare
15:00 BST	Grubb 90' (pen.)	Report	Davies 7'; Street 22' (pen.)	Stadium: Woodspring Stadium; Attendance: 684; Referee: Savvas Yianni

18 July 2023 Friendly	Cheltenham Town	1–0	West Bromwich Albion	Cheltenham
19:45 BST	Keena 60'	Report		Stadium: Whaddon Road; Attendance: 2,015; Referee: John Busby

22 July 2023 Friendly	Cheltenham Town	2–3	Birmingham City	Cheltenham
15:00 BST	Chapman 15'; Lloyd 30'	Report	Anderson 25'; James 35'; Bacuna 41'	Stadium: Whaddon Road; Attendance: 2,581 (1,276 from Birmingham); Referee: Sam Allison

25 July 2023 Friendly	Cheltenham Town	1–1	Bristol City	Cheltenham
19:45 BST	Keena 63' (pen.)	Report	Tanner 41'	Stadium: Whaddon Road; Attendance: 2,305 (1,115 from Bristol City); Referee: Sam Allison

28 July 2023 Friendly	Newport County	1–1	Cheltenham Town	Newport
14:00 BST	Palmer-Houlden 60'	Report	Keena 86'	Stadium: Rodney Parade; Attendance: 1,163 (76 Robins fans); Referee: Jordan Harman

== Competitions ==
=== Overall record ===
Competition	Starting round	Final position	Record							
Competition	Starting round	Final position	Pld	W	D	L	GF	GA	GD	Win %
League One	Matchday 1	21st	46	12	8	26	41	65	−24	26.09
FA Cup	First round	First round	1	0	0	1	1	5	−4	0.00
EFL Cup	First round	First round	1	0	0	1	0	2	−2	0.00
EFL Trophy	Group stage	Group stage	3	0	0	3	1	10	−9	0.00
Total			51	12	8	31	43	82	−39	23.53

Last updated: 29 April 2024
Source: Soccerway

=== League One ===
==== League table ====
Pos	Team	Pld	W	D	L	GF	GA	GD	Pts	Promotion, qualification or relegation
18	Cambridge United	46	12	12	22	39	61	−22	48	
19	Shrewsbury Town	46	13	9	24	35	67	−32	48	
20	Burton Albion	46	12	10	24	39	67	−28	46	
21	Cheltenham Town (R)	46	12	8	26	41	65	−24	44	Relegation to EFL League Two
22	Fleetwood Town (R)	46	10	13	23	49	72	−23	43	Relegation to EFL League Two
23	Port Vale (R)	46	10	11	25	41	74	−33	41	Relegation to EFL League Two
24	Carlisle United (R)	46	7	9	30	41	81	−40	30	Relegation to EFL League Two

Source: EFL Official Website
Rules for classification: 1) Points; 2) Goal difference; 3) Number of goals scored; 4) Head-to-head results; 5) Wins; 6) Away goals; 7) Penalty points (sec 9.5); 8) 12-point sending off offences
(R) Relegated

==== Results summary ====
Overall								Home						Away					
Pld	W	D	L	GF	GA	GD	Pts	W	D	L	GF	GA	GD	W	D	L	GF	GA	GD
46	12	8	26	41	65	−24	44	7	4	12	24	34	−10	5	4	14	17	31	−14

Last updated: 29 April 2024.
Source: Soccerway

==== Results by round ====
Round	1	2	3	4	5	6	8	7^{1}	9	10	11	12	14	15	16	17	19	20	21	20	23	24	25	26	27	28^{4}	30	31	32	33	34	35	13^{2}	36	37	38	39	41	42	43	29^{5}	44	18^{3}	45	40^{6}	46
Ground	A	H	A	A	H	H	A	A	H	A	H	H	H	A	A	H	H	A	A	H	A	H	H	A	H	A	A	H	A	H	H	A	A	H	H	A	A	A	H	A	H	H	A	H	H	A
Result	L	L	L	D	L	L	L	L	L	L	L	D	W	L	W	D	W	L	D	L	W	W	D	L	W	L	L	L	W	W	W	D	L	D	L	L	D	W	L	L	L	L	W	L	W	L
Position	15	20	21	22	24	24	23	23	24	24	24	24	24	24	23	23	23	24	24	24	24	22	22	23	22	22	22	22	22	22	21	21	21	21	21	21	21	22	22	22	22	22	21	21	21	21

Updated to match(es) played on 23 April 2024. Source: Soccerway
A = Away; H = Home; W = Win; D = Draw; L = Loss; P = Postponed
Notes:
- ^{1} Matchday 7 (vs Peterborough United) was postponed due to the international call-ups.
- ^{2} Matchday 13 (vs Wycombe Wanderers) was postponed due to the international call-ups.
- ^{3} Matchday 18 (vs Burton Albion) was postponed due to the international call-ups.
- ^{4} Matchday 28 (vs Bolton Wanderers) was abandoned due to a medical emergency in the crowd.
- ^{5} Matchday 29 (vs Carlisle United) was postponed due to a frozen pitch.
- ^{6} Matchday 40 (vs Peterborough United) was postponed due to the international call-ups.

==== Matches ====
On 22 June, the EFL League One fixtures were released.

Win Draw Loss Fixtures

5 August 2023 1	Shrewsbury Town	1–0	Cheltenham Town	Shrewsbury
15:00 BST	Bowman (yellow card) 3' (goal) 50'; Anderson (yellow card) 13'; Kenneh (yellow card) 65'	Report	Thompson (yellow card) 45+3'; Hammond (yellow card) 87'	Stadium: New Meadow; Attendance: 6,599; Referee: Christopher Pollard

12 August 2023 2	Cheltenham Town	0–3	Bolton Wanderers	Cheltenham
15:00 BST	Davies (yellow card) 29'; Smith (yellow card) 39'	Report	Charles 15', 33'; Smith 30' (o.g.); Adeboyejo (yellow card) 57'	Stadium: Whaddon Road; Attendance: 4,898; Referee: David Rock

15 August 2023 3	Reading	1–0	Cheltenham Town	Reading
20:00 BST	Ferry 33' (o.g.); Carson (yellow card) 49'; McIntyre (yellow card) 90+6'	Report	Long (yellow card) 38'; Street (yellow card) 90+5'	Stadium: Madejski Stadium; Attendance: Ben Speedie

19 August 2023 4	Portsmouth	0–0	Cheltenham Town	Portsmouth
15:00 BST		Report	Sercombe (yellow card) 30'; Thompson (yellow card) 54'; Southwood (yellow card) 84'	Stadium: Fratton Park; Attendance: 17,454; Referee: Ben Toner

26 August 2023 5	Cheltenham Town	0–1	Northampton Town	Cheltenham
15:00 BST	Freestone (yellow card) 82'	Report	Bowie (yellow card) 14'; Guthrie (yellow card) 64'; Hoskins 88'	Stadium: Whaddon Road; Attendance: 3,907; Referee: Tom Nield

2 September 2023 6	Cheltenham Town	0–2	Barnsley	Cheltenham
15:00 BST	Williams (yellow card) 14'; Freestone (yellow card) 66'; Bevan (yellow card) 70'	Report	McAtee (yellow card) 33'; Kane (yellow card) 45+4'; Cole 54'; Shepherd (yellow card) 78'; Watters 90+2'	Stadium: Whaddon Road; Attendance: 3,923; Referee: Sunny Gill

16 September 2023 8	Exeter City	1–0	Cheltenham Town	Exeter
15:00 BST	Wildschut (yellow card) 38'; Watts 68'; Scott (yellow card) 75'; Carroll (yellow card) 87'	Report	B. Williams (yellow card) 18'; J. Williams (yellow card) 61'	Stadium: St James Park; Attendance: 6,312 (332 away); Referee: Martin Woods

19 September 2023 7	Peterborough United	3–0	Cheltenham Town	Peterborough
19:45 BST	Burrows 54'; Clarke-Harris 61'; Kioso 90+4'	Report	Olayinka (red card) 5'; Butler-Oyedeji (yellow card) 87' (yellow-red card) 88'	Stadium: London Road Stadium; Attendance: 5,083; Referee: Scott Oldham
Note: Fixture was previous postponed due to international call-ups.

23 September 2023 9	Cheltenham Town	0–3	Stevenage	Cheltenham
15:00 BST	Keena (yellow card) 30'	Report	Roberts 7'; Thompson (yellow card) 45+3'; List 69', 73'	Stadium: Whaddon Road; Attendance: 3,947; Referee: Leigh Doughty

30 September 2023 10	Lincoln City	2–0	Cheltenham Town	Lincoln
15:00 BST	Sørensen 5', 21'; Jackson (yellow card) 11'; Bishop (yellow card) 44'; Hamilton (yellow card) 81'; Erhahon (yellow card) 89'	Report	Bevan (yellow card) 81'	Stadium: Sincil Bank; Attendance: 7,220; Referee: Ben Atkinson

3 October 2023 11	Cheltenham Town	0–2	Fleetwood Town	Cheltenham
19:45 BST	Street (yellow card) 55'; Freestone (yellow card) 65'; Davies (red card) 70'	Report	Omochere (yellow card) 9'; Quitirna 19'; Lawal (yellow card) 39'; Robertson (yellow card) 59'; Broom (yellow card) 72'; Marriott 80'; Stockley (yellow card) 90+9'	Stadium: Whaddon Road; Attendance: 3,104; Referee: Sam Purkiss

7 October 2023 12	Cheltenham Town	1–1	Derby County	Cheltenham
15:00 BST	Street 39'; Bradbury (yellow card) 70'	Report	Nelson 45+7'	Stadium: Whaddon Road; Attendance: 5,292; Referee: Peter Wright

21 October 2023 14	Cheltenham Town	1–0	Cambridge United	Cheltenham
15:00 GMT	Sercombe 5'; Goodwin (yellow card) 64'; Bonds (yellow card) 66'; Freestone (yellow card) 85'; Williams (yellow card) 90+2'	Report	Bennett (yellow card) 54'	Stadium: Whaddon Road; Attendance: 3,900; Referee: Edward Duckworth

24 October 2023 15	Blackpool	3–2	Cheltenham Town	Blackpool
19:45 GMT	Lavery 18'; Rhodes 32'; Dembélé 41'	Report	Long (yellow card) 36'; Goodwin 44', 86'; Freestone (yellow card) 75'	Stadium: Bloomfield Road; Attendance: 9,288; Referee: Adam Herczeg

28 October 2023 16	Port Vale	1–2	Cheltenham Town	Burslem
15:00 GMT	Devine 32'; Debrah (yellow card) 66'; Thomas (yellow card) 90+1'	Report	Ferry (yellow card) 31'; Davies (yellow card) 34'; Long 42', 66'; Williams (yellow card) 45+4'; Goodwin (yellow card) 59'	Stadium: Vale Park; Attendance: 6,471; Referee: Matthew Corlett

11 November 2023 17	Cheltenham Town	1–1	Wigan Athletic	Cheltenham
15:00 GMT	Pett (yellow card) 27'; Sercombe 32' (pen.) (yellow card) 45+4'	Report	Freestone 6' (o.g.); Rekik (yellow card) 39'; Jones (yellow card) 58'; Humphrys (penalty missed) 64'; Shaw (yellow card) 65'	Stadium: Whaddon Road; Referee: Carl Brook

25 November 2023 19	Cheltenham Town	2–0	Oxford United	Cheltenham
15:00 GMT	Street 34' (red card) 45+2'; Williams (yellow card) 48'; Bevan (yellow card) 72'; Goodwin 76'; Pett (yellow card) 86'	Report	Thorniley (yellow card) 32'; Rodrigues (yellow card) 55' (yellow-red card) 68'; Brannagan (yellow card) 72'	Stadium: Whaddon Road; Referee: Scott Simpson

28 November 2023 20	Charlton Athletic	2–1	Cheltenham Town	Charlton
19:45 GMT	May 17' (pen.), 86' (pen.); Edun (yellow card) 90+1'	Report	Goodwin 10' (yellow card) 55'; Chapman (yellow card) 45+1'; Southwood (yellow card) 69'; Long (yellow card) 83'; Bevan (yellow card) 85'	Stadium: The Valley; Attendance: 10,623; Referee: Gavin Ward

9 December 2023 21	Bristol Rovers	1–1	Cheltenham Town	Horfield
15:00 GMT	Hunt (yellow card) 45+4' (goal) 50'	Report	Goodwin 28'; Lloyd (yellow card) 59'; Freestone (yellow card) 78'; Butler-Oyedeji (yellow card) 90+1'	Stadium: Memorial Stadium; Attendance: 8,346; Referee: Craig Hicks

16 December 2023 22	Cheltenham Town	1–2	Leyton Orient	Cheltenham
15:00 GMT	Williams (yellow card) 17' (yellow-red card) 18'; Smith (yellow card) 47'; Goodwin 68' (pen.); Freestone (yellow card) 85'	Report	Beckles (yellow card) 3'; Sotiriou (yellow card) 32'; Brown (yellow card) 58'; Pratley (yellow card) 67'; Forde 89'; Galbraith 90+4'	Stadium: Whaddon Road; Attendance: 3,887; Referee: Tom Reeves

23 December 2023 23	Carlisle United	0–1	Cheltenham Town	Carlisle
15:00 GMT	Lavelle (yellow card) 38'; Moxon (yellow card) 67'	Report	Sercombe 27'; Bonds (yellow card) 40'; Freestone (yellow card) 82'; Long (yellow card) 90+5'	Stadium: Brunton Park; Attendance: 7,814; Referee: Declan Bourne

26 December 2023 24	Cheltenham Town	2–0	Shrewsbury Town	Cheltenham
15:00 GMT	Street (yellow card) 9'; Lloyd 34', 85'; Thompson (yellow card) 36'	Report	Maroši (yellow card) 9'; Anderson (yellow card) 34'; Pierre (yellow card) 58'; Dunkley (yellow card) 65'; Sobowale (yellow card) 80'	Stadium: Whaddon Road; Attendance: 5,146; Referee: Paul Howard

29 December 2023 25	Cheltenham Town	2–2	Reading	Cheltenham
19:45 GMT	Sercombe 29'; Button 37' (o.g.); Pett (yellow card) 67'; Smith (yellow card) 79'	Report	Mbengue (yellow card) 27'; Smith (yellow card) 32'; Dorsett (yellow card) 36', (goal) 45'; Mukairu 45+2'; Knibbs (yellow card) 89'	Stadium: Whaddon Road; Attendance: 5,941; Referee: Scott Tallis

1 January 2024 26	Northampton Town	1–0	Cheltenham Town	Northampton
15:00 GMT	Willis (yellow card) 53'; Bowie 66' (pen.); Simpson (yellow card) 90+1'	Report	Smith (yellow card) 26'; Freestone (yellow card) 66'; Long (yellow card) 90'	Stadium: Sixfields Stadium; Attendance: 6,467; Referee: Neil Hair

6 January 2024 27	Cheltenham Town	2–1	Portsmouth	Cheltenham
15:00 GMT	Ferry (yellow card) 37'; Pett (yellow card) 45+3'; Sercombe 51', 54'; Bradbury (yellow card) 72'; Long (yellow card) 75'	Report	Kamara (yellow card) 34'; Bradbury 49' (o.g.); Bishop (yellow card) 87'; Rafferty (yellow card) 90+1'; Lane (yellow card) 90+4'; Scully (yellow card) 90+5'	Stadium: Whaddon Road; Attendance: 5,561; Referee: Simon Mather

23 January 2024 28	Bolton Wanderers	1–0	Cheltenham Town	Horwich
19:45 GMT	Adeboyejo 24'; Thomason (yellow card) 90+6'	Report	Bradbury (yellow card) 45'; Harrop (yellow card) 87'	Stadium: University of Bolton Stadium; Referee: Ben Speedie
Note: Fixture was originally scheduled for 13 January, but was abandoned due to a medical emergency in the crowd.

27 January 2024 30	Derby County	2–1	Cheltenham Town	Derby
15:00 GMT	Bird 60'; Collins 81'; Wilson (yellow card) 89'	Report	Sercombe 50'; Freestone (yellow card) 55'; Long (yellow card) 70'	Stadium: Pride Park Stadium; Attendance: 27,040 (712 from Cheltenham); Referee: Leigh Doughty

3 February 2024 31	Cheltenham Town	1–3	Wycombe Wanderers	Cheltenham
15:00 GMT	Taylor 58' (yellow card) 87'	Report	Grimmer 20' (yellow card) 37'; McCleary 29' (penalty missed) 49'; Davies 49' (o.g.); Butcher (yellow card) 60'	Stadium: Whaddon Road; Attendance: 4,181; Referee: Martin Coy

10 February 2024 32	Cambridge United	0–1	Cheltenham Town	Cambridge
15:00 GMT	Bennett (yellow card) 36'; Cousins (yellow card) 88'; Thomas (yellow card) 90'	Report	Taylor (yellow card) 54' (goal) 65'; Pett (yellow card) 70'; Nuttall (yellow card) 80'	Stadium: Abbey Stadium; Attendance: 7,047; Referee: Ben Atkinson

13 February 2024 33	Cheltenham Town	2–0	Blackpool	Cheltenham
19:45 GMT	Bonds 31', 85'; Keena (penalty missed) 74'	Report		Stadium: Whaddon Road; Attendance: 3,865; Referee: Matthew Corlett

17 February 2024 34	Cheltenham Town	3–2	Port Vale	Cheltenham
15:00 GMT	Taylor 45+2'; Shepherd 69'; Ferry 73'	Report	Smith 25'; Davies 65' (o.g.)	Stadium: Whaddon Road; Attendance: 5,600; Referee: Sam Purkiss

23 February 2024 35	Wigan Athletic	1–1	Cheltenham Town	Wigan
19:45 GMT	Bonds 52' (o.g.); McManaman (yellow card) 90+3'	Report	Taylor 9'	Stadium: DW Stadium; Attendance: 9,326; Referee: David Rock
Note: Fixture was originally scheduled for 24 February, but was moved due to the Rugby League World Club Challenge taking priority.

27 February 2024 13	Wycombe Wanderers	2–0	Cheltenham Town	High Wycombe
19:45 BST	Potts (penalty missed) 52'; Low 86'; Lubala 89'	Report	Smith (yellow card) 85'	Stadium: Adams Park; Attendance: 3,477; Referee: Peter Wright
Note: Fixture was originally scheduled for 14 October, but was postponed due to international call-ups within the Wycombe squad.

2 March 2024 36	Cheltenham Town	0–0	Burton Albion	Cheltenham
15:00 GMT	Ferry (yellow card) 88'	Report	Sweeney (yellow card) 35'; Powell (yellow card) 44'; Oshilaja (yellow card) 50'; Crocombe (yellow card) 71'	Stadium: Whaddon Road; Attendance: 4,133; Referee: Thomas Parsons

5 March 2024 37	Cheltenham Town	1–3	Charlton Athletic	Cheltenham
19:45 GMT	Sercombe 70'	Report	Kanu 19'; Bakinson 86' (yellow card) 88'; May (yellow card) 86' (goal) 90'	Stadium: Whaddon Road; Attendance: 4,392; Referee: Scott Jackson

9 March 2024 38	Oxford United	2–1	Cheltenham Town	Littlemore
15:00 GMT	Murphy 45+3'; Brown (yellow card) 76'; Leigh 88'	Report	Sercombe (yellow card) 20'; Davies (yellow card) 61'; Harrop (yellow card) 73'; Ferry 80'	Stadium: Kassam Stadium; Attendance: 8,738; Referee: Marc Edwards

16 March 2024 39	Barnsley	0–0	Cheltenham Town	Barnsley
15:00 GMT	Earl (yellow card) 55'	Report	Ferry (yellow card) 90+1'	Stadium: Oakwell; Attendance: 12,056; Referee: Daniel Middleton

29 March 2024 41	Fleetwood Town	1–2	Cheltenham Town	Fleetwood
15:00 GMT	Sarpong-Wiredu (yellow card) 65'; Graydon 79'	Report	Sercombe 30'; Ferry (yellow card) 42'; Pett (yellow card) 56'; Keena 82'	Stadium: Highbury Stadium; Attendance: 3,642; Referee: Ollie Yates

1 April 2024 42	Cheltenham Town	1–2	Exeter City	Cheltenham
15:00 BST	Kinsella (yellow card) 38'; Williams 51'; Thomas (yellow card) 59'; Nuttall (yellow card) 60'; Long (yellow card) 84'; Harrop (yellow card) 86'	Report	Sweeney (yellow card) 42'; Harris 56'; Cole 90' (pen.)	Stadium: Whaddon Road; Attendance: 5,657; Referee: Stephen Martin

6 April 2024 43	Leyton Orient	3–1	Cheltenham Town	Leyton
15:00 BST	Galbraith 34', (yellow card) 59'; O'Neill 44', (yellow card) 65'; Brown (yellow card) 53'; Sotiriou 85'	Report	Freestone (yellow card) 35'; Nuttall 90+7'	Stadium: Brisbane Road; Attendance: 7,804; Referee: Simon Mather

9 April 2024 29	Cheltenham Town	0–1	Carlisle United	Cheltenham
19:45 BST		Report	Huntington (yellow card) 7'; Lavelle 42', (yellow card) 85'; Robinson (yellow card) 78'	Stadium: Whaddon Road; Attendance: 4,682; Referee: David Rock
Note: Fixture was originally scheduled for 20 January, but was postponed due to a frozen pitch.

13 April 2024 44	Cheltenham Town	1–3	Bristol Rovers	Cheltenham
15:00 BST	Smith (yellow card) 7'; Shepherd (yellow card) 13'; Ferry (yellow card) 90+2'; Sercombe 90+4'	Report	Sinclair 12'; Evans (penalty missed) 35'; Aguilera 56'; Hunt (yellow card) 62'; Baggott 77'	Stadium: Whaddon Road; Attendance: 5,501; Referee: Paul Howard

16 April 2024 18	Burton Albion	1–2	Cheltenham Town	Burton upon Trent
19:45 BST	Moon (yellow card) 34'; Seddon 45+4'; Nsiala (yellow card) 50'; Crocombe (yellow card) 86'	Report	Taylor 51'; Davies 71'; Ferry (yellow card) 84'	Stadium: Pirelli Stadium; Attendance: 3,020; Referee: Ben Speedie
Note: Fixture was originally scheduled for 18 November and 5 February, but was postponed due to international call-ups and a waterlogged pitch respectively.

20 April 2024 45	Cheltenham Town	1–2	Lincoln City	Cheltenham
15:00 BST	Sercombe 15' (pen.); Bonds (yellow card) 53'; Davies (yellow card) 75'; Harrop (yellow card) 86'; Long (yellow card) 87'	Report	Taylor 40'; Draper 52'	Stadium: Whaddon Road; Attendance: 5,323; Referee: Thomas Kirk

23 April 2024 40	Cheltenham Town	2–0	Peterborough United	Cheltenham
19:45 BST	Nuttall 11'; Taylor 21', (yellow card) 74'	Report		Stadium: Whaddon Road; Attendance: 3,873; Referee: Edward Duckworth
Note: Fixture was originally scheduled for 23 March, but was postponed due to international call-ups.

27 April 2024 46	Stevenage	2–1	Cheltenham Town	Stevenage
15:00 BST	Hemmings 45+1' (pen.); Roberts (yellow card) 50'; Thompson (yellow card) 74'; Freeman 90'	Report	Nuttall (yellow card) 45+3'; Thomas (yellow card) 51'; Taylor 53'; Shepherd (yellow card) 84'	Stadium: Broadhall Way; Attendance: 5,441; Referee: Lee Swabey

==== Postponed matches ====
9 September 2023 7	Peterborough United	P–P	Cheltenham Town	Peterborough
15:00 BST				Stadium: London Road Stadium
Note: Fixture was previous postponed due to international call-ups.

14 October 2023 13	Wycombe Wanderers	P-P	Cheltenham Town	High Wycombe
15:00 BST				Stadium: Adams Park; Referee: Peter Wright
Note: Fixture was originally scheduled for 14 October, but was postponed due to international call-ups within the Wycombe squad.

18 November 2023 18	Burton Albion	P-P	Cheltenham Town	Burton upon Trent
15:00 GMT		Report		Stadium: Pirelli Stadium
Note: Fixture postponed due to international call-ups

23 January 2024 18	Burton Albion	P-P	Cheltenham Town	Burton upon Trent
19:45 GMT		Report		Stadium: Pirelli Stadium
Note: Fixture postponed due to fixture congestion.

5 February 2024 18	Burton Albion	P-P	Cheltenham Town	Burton upon Trent
19:45 GMT		Report		Stadium: Pirelli Stadium
Note: Fixture postponed due to a waterlogged pitch.

20 January 2024 29	Cheltenham Town	P-P	Carlisle United	Cheltenham
15:00 GMT				Stadium: Whaddon Road
Note: Fixture was originally scheduled for 20 January, but was postponed due to a frozen pitch.

23 March 2024 40	Cheltenham Town	P-P	Peterborough United	Cheltenham
19:45 GMT		Report		Stadium: Whaddon Road
Note: Fixture postponed due to international call-ups.

==== Abandoned match with Bolton Wanderers ====
On 13 January 2024, during the away at home against Bolton Wanderers, Iain Purslow, a spectator supporting Bolton suffered a cardiac arrest. The match was suspended in the 29th minute resulting in the players leaving the pitch. The match was abandoned 30 minutes later. It was subsequently confirmed that Purslow died later in hospital. On 15 January 2024, it was announced the match would be replayed in full on 23 January 2024. This necessitated rearranging the Burton Albion v Cheltenham fixture, originally scheduled for 23 January 2024.

13 January 2024 28	Bolton Wanderers	0–0; Abandoned	Cheltenham Town	Horwich
15:00 GMT		Report		Stadium: Toughsheet Community Stadium; Referee: Sunny Singh Gill
Note: Match abandoned due to a medical emergency in the crowd.

=== FA Cup ===
Town were drawn away to AFC Wimbledon in the first round.

Win Draw Loss Fixtures

4 November 2023 First Round	AFC Wimbledon	5–1	Cheltenham Town	Wimbledon
15:00 GMT	Al-Hamadi 23'; Tilley 45+2', 61'; Little (yellow card) 59'; Davison 65'; Lemonheigh-Evans 70'	Report	Thompson (yellow card) 59'; Street 76'; Keena (penalty missed) 86'; Williams (yellow card) 90+1'	Stadium: Plough Lane; Attendance: 4,975; Referee: Ross Joyce

=== EFL Cup ===
Cheltenham were drawn at home to Birmingham City in the first round.

Win Draw Loss Fixtures

8 August 2023 First round	Cheltenham Town	0–2	Birmingham City	Cheltenham
19:45 BST	Davies (yellow card) 31'; Southwood (yellow card) 63'; Chapman (yellow card) 71'; Freestone (yellow card) 75'	Report	Bacuna 24', 32' (yellow card) 43'; James (yellow card) 63'	Stadium: Whaddon Road; Attendance: 4,026; Referee: Craig Hicks

=== EFL Trophy ===
In the group stage, Cheltenham Town were drawn into Southern Group H alongside Newport County, Bristol Rovers and West Ham United U21.

Pos	Div	Team	Pld	W	PW	PL	L	GF	GA	GD	Pts	Qualification
1	ACA	West Ham United U21	3	3	0	0	0	8	1	+7	9	Advance to Round 2
2	L1	Bristol Rovers	3	2	0	0	1	6	4	+2	6	Advance to Round 2
3	L2	Newport County	3	1	0	0	2	2	2	0	3	
4	L1	Cheltenham Town	3	0	0	0	3	1	10	−9	0	

Updated to match(es) played on 14 November 2023. Source: EFL.com

Win Draw Loss Fixtures

5 September 2023 Group stage	Bristol Rovers	4–1	Cheltenham Town	Horfield
19:45 BST	Gibbons 9'; Evans 27'; Collins 40'; McCormick (yellow card) 48'; Street 68' (o.g.)	Report	Gibbons 50' (o.g.); Adshead (yellow card) 63'; Willcox (yellow card) 72'; Chapman (yellow card) 84'	Stadium: Memorial Stadium; Attendance: 1,184; Referee: Daniel Middleton

10 October 2023 Group stage	Cheltenham Town	0–2	Newport County	Cheltenham
19:30 BST		Report	Wood 26'; Evans 53'	Stadium: Whaddon Road; Attendance: 1,175; Referee: Matthew Russell

7 November 2023 Group stage	Cheltenham Town	0–4	West Ham United U21	Cheltenham
19:30 GMT	Horton (yellow card) 29'; Adshead (yellow card) 58'; Willcox (yellow card) 90+1'	Report	Scales 23'; Mubama 24'; Earthy 35'; Marshall 80'	Stadium: Whaddon Road; Referee: Tom Reeves
