= 2022–23 Cheltenham Town F.C. season =

Cheltenham Town FC
2022–23 season
- Chairman: David Bloxham
- Head Coach: Wade Elliott
- Stadium: Whaddon Road
- League One: 16th
- FA Cup: First round
- EFL Cup: First round
- EFL Trophy: Semi-finals
- Top goalscorer: League: Alfie May (20); All: Alfie May (22)

The 2022–23 season was the 136th season in the existence of Cheltenham Town Football Club and the club's second consecutive season in League One. In addition to the league, they also competed in the 2022–23 FA Cup, the 2022–23 EFL Cup and the 2022–23 EFL Trophy.

== Transfers ==
=== In ===
Date	Pos	Player	Transferred from	Fee	Ref
21 June 2022	CM	(England) Daniel Adshead	(England) Norwich City	Undisclosed	
1 July 2022 (Note: The transfer was announced on 22 June, and would become official on July 1, once his FC Halifax Town contract expired)	CB	(England) Tom Bradbury	(England) FC Halifax Town	Free Transfer	
8 July 2022	GK	(England) Shaun MacDonald	(England) Torquay United	Free Transfer	
21 July 2022	RB	(England) Ryan Jackson	(England) Gillingham	Free Transfer	
9 August 2022	LM	(Republic of Ireland) Will Ferry	(England) Southampton	Undisclosed	
12 August 2022	CF	(Wales) Christian Norton	(England) Stoke City	Free Transfer	
1 September 2022	RM	(Wales) Ryan Broom	(England) Peterborough United	Undisclosed	
1 September 2022	CM	(England) James Olayinka	(England) Arsenal	Undisclosed	
9 January 2023	CF	(England) Will Goodwin	(England) Stoke City	Undisclosed	
29 January 2023	CF	(Republic of Ireland) Aidan Keena	(Republic of Ireland) Sligo Rovers	Undisclosed	

=== Out ===
Date	Pos	Player	Transferred to	Fee	Ref
21 June 2022	GK	(Wales) Owen Evans	(England) Walsall	Undisclosed	
30 June 2022	CM	(England) Josh Aldridge	(England) Evesham United	Released	
30 June 2022	CB	(England) Will Boyle	(England) Huddersfield Town	Rejected contract	
30 June 2022	CM	(England) Charlie Colkett	(England) Crewe Alexandra	Released	
30 June 2022	MF	(England) Charlie Dashfield	Unattached	Released	
30 June 2022	MF	(England) Brennan Denness-Barrett	Unattached	Released	
30 June 2022	GK	(England) Scott Flinders	(England) Mansfield Town	Released	
30 June 2022	RB	(England) Joe Hunt	Unattached	Released	
30 June 2022	LB	(England) Connor Jakeways	Unattached	Released	
30 June 2022	AM	(England) Felix Miles	(England) Stratford Town	Released	
30 June 2022	GK	(England) Jake Parsisson	Unattached	Released	
30 June 2022	DF	(England) Will Ramsey	Unattached	Released	
30 June 2022	LB	(England) Harvey Skurek	(England) Slimbridge	Released	
30 June 2022	DF	(England) Will Taylor	Unattached	Released	
30 June 2022	DM	(England) Conor Thomas	(England) Crewe Alexandra	Released	
30 June 2022	CF	(England) Andy Williams	(England) Walsall	Released	
30 June 2022	CM	(England) Archie Woodall	(United States) Central Arkansas Bears	Released	
1 July 2022	DF	(England) George Clark	(England) Gresley Rovers	Free Transfer	
12 September 2022	RB	(England) Matty Blair	Retired		

=== Loans in ===
Date	Pos	Player	Loaned from	On loan until	Ref
4 July 2022	CF	(England) Dan Nlundulu	(England) Southampton	1 January 2023	
14 July 2022	CM	(England) Taylor Perry	(England) Wolverhampton Wanderers	End of Season	
22 July 2022	GK	(Northern Ireland) Luke Southwood	(England) Reading	End of Season	
22 July 2022	CB	(England) Caleb Taylor	(England) West Bromwich Albion	End of Season	
22 July 2022	DF	(England) James Taylor	(England) Bristol City	3 January 2023 (Note: On 3 January, Taylor's loan from Bristol City was cut short)	
19 January 2023	CB	(Indonesia) Elkan Baggott	(England) Ipswich Town	End of Season	
31 January 2023	DM	(Republic of Ireland) Glen Rea	(England) Luton Town	End of Season	

=== Loans out ===
Date	Pos	Player	Loaned to	On loan until	Ref
25 July 2022	GK	(England) Max Harris	(England) Weston-super-Mare	End of Season	
20 August 2022	CF	(England) Callum Ebanks	(England) Eastleigh	19 November 2022 (Note: On 19 November, Ebanks was recalled back and loaned to Bath City.)	
20 September 2022	LB	(England) Reece Hutchinson	(England) Ilkeston Town	20 December 2022	
30 September 2022	DM	(England) Dylan Barkers	(England) Maidstone United	30 October 2022	
11 November 2022	MF	(Portugal) Adulai Sambu	(England) Redditch United	End of Season	
17 November 2022	CM	(England) Ellis Chapman	(England) Oldham Athletic	18 January 2023 (Note: On 16 December, Chapman's loan at Oldham was extended, On 18 January it was extended again until the end of the season)	
19 November 2022	CF	(England) Callum Ebanks	(England) Bath City	1 January 2023	
20 December 2022	CB	(England) Grant Horton	(Republic of Ireland) Bohemian	End of Season	
26 December 2022	FW	(England) Zac Guinan	(England) Cirencester Town	26 January 2023	
13 January 2023	CF	(England) Callum Ebanks	(England) Stratford Town	End of Season (Note: On 13 February, Ebanks' loan at Stratford was extended until March. Then on March 3, it was extended until the end of the season)	
31 January 2023	CM	(England) Daniel Adshead	(England) Rochdale	End of Season	
31 January 2023	CF	(England) George Lloyd	(England) Grimsby Town	End of Season	
1 February 2023	LB	(England) Reece Hutchinson	(Republic of Ireland) Sligo Rovers	End of Season	
16 March 2023	CF	(England) Zac Guinan	(England) Swindon Supermarine	End of Season	
16 March 2023	RB	(England) Adulai Sambu	(England) Cirencester Town	End of Season	

== Pre-season and friendlies ==
On 16 May 2022, National League South side Bath City announced that a pre-season fixture at home to Cheltenham had been scheduled for 9 July. Cheltenham Town then confirmed their first set of pre-season fixtures on June 3. A second home friendly fixture, against Birmingham City was added. On June 16, a home fixture against Northampton Town was added to the pre-season schedule.

Win Draw Loss Fixtures

2 July 2022 Friendly	Evesham United	0–4	Cheltenham Town	Evesham
15:00 BST		Report	Guinan 15'; Williams 41'; Lloyd 84'; Sercombe 88'	Stadium: The Spiers & Hartwell Stadium; Attendance: 680; Referee: Ash Clarke

6 July 2022 Friendly	Bristol City	2–0	Cheltenham Town	Failand
TBA BST	Tanner 70'; Conway 90'	Report		Stadium: Robins High Performance Centre; Attendance: 0 (behind-closed-doors)

9 July 2022 Friendly	Bath City	0–0	Cheltenham Town	Bath
15:00 BST		Report		Stadium: Twerton Park

12 July 2022 Friendly	Stratford Town	1–2	Cheltenham Town	Tiddington
19:30 BST	Dawes (?)	Report	Barkers (?); Nlundulu (?)	Stadium: Arden Garages Stadium; Referee: Callum Fisk

16 July 2022 Friendly	Cheltenham Town	1–2	Cardiff City	Cheltenham
15:00 BST	Sercombe 42'	Report	Harris 59' (pen.); Watters 88'	Stadium: The Completely-Suzuki Stadium; Attendance: 1,788; Referee: Simon Hooper

19 July 2022 Friendly	Cheltenham Town	1–0	Birmingham City	Cheltenham
19:45 BST	May 85'	Report		Stadium: The Completely-Suzuki Stadium; Attendance: 1,429; Referee: John Brooks

23 July 2022 Friendly	Cheltenham Town	2–0	Northampton Town	Cheltenham
15:00 BST	May 34'; Nlundulu (?)	Report		Stadium: The Completely-Suzuki Stadium; Attendance: 781; Referee: Andy Woolmer

== Competitions ==
=== Overall record ===
Competition	First match	Last match	Starting round	Record							
Competition	First match	Last match	Starting round	Pld	W	D	L	GF	GA	GD	Win %
League One	30 July 2022	6 May 2023	Matchday 1	26	8	4	14	23	34	−11	30.77
FA Cup	5 November 2022	5 November 2022	First round	1	0	0	1	1	2	−1	0.00
EFL Cup	9 August 2022	9 August 2022	First round	1	0	0	1	0	7	−7	0.00
EFL Trophy	30 August 2022	Ongoing	Group stage	6	4	1	1	13	6	+7	66.67
Total				34	12	5	17	37	49	−12	35.29

Last updated: 21 January 2023
Source: [ Soccerway]

=== League One ===
==== League table ====
Pos	Team	Pld	W	D	L	GF	GA	GD	Pts
13	Fleetwood Town	46	14	16	16	53	51	+2	58
14	Exeter City	46	15	11	20	64	68	−4	56
15	Burton Albion	46	15	11	20	57	79	−22	56
16	Cheltenham Town	46	14	12	20	45	61	−16	54
17	Bristol Rovers	46	14	11	21	58	73	−15	53
18	Port Vale	46	13	10	23	48	71	−23	49
19	Oxford United	46	11	14	21	49	56	−7	47

Source: EFL Official Website
Rules for classification: 1) Points; 2) Goal difference; 3) Number of goals scored; 4) Head-to-head results; 5) Wins; 6) Away goals; 7) Penalty points (sec 9.5); 8) 12-point sending off offences

==== Results summary ====
Overall								Home						Away					
Pld	W	D	L	GF	GA	GD	Pts	W	D	L	GF	GA	GD	W	D	L	GF	GA	GD
45	14	11	20	43	59	−16	53	8	7	7	23	25	−2	6	4	13	20	34	−14

Last updated: 29 April 2023.
Source: [ Soccerway]

==== Results by round ====
Round	1	2	3	4	5	6	7	8	9	10	11	12	13	14	15	16	17	18	19	20	21	22	23	24	25	26	27	28	29	30	31	32	33	34	35	36	37	38	39	40	41	42	43	44	45
Ground	H	A	H	A	A	H	A	H	A	H	H	A	H	A	H	H	A	H	A	A	H	A	A	A	H	A	H	A	H	A	H	A	A	H	H	A	H	H	H	A	H	A	H	A	A
Result	L	L	L	D	W	L	D	W	L	W	W	L	L	L	W	D	D	W	W	L	L	W	L	L	L	L	D	L	D	W	L	L	L	W	D	W	W	D	D	L	D	D	W	L	W
Position	18	22	23	23	21	21	21	19	20	17	14	17	20	20	18	19	19	18	16	17	18	16	18	18	18	18	18	18	19	18	19	19	19	18	17	17	17	17	16	16	16	17	16	17	17

Updated to match(es) played on 29 April 2023. Source: [ Soccerway]
A = Away; H = Home; W = Win; D = Draw; L = Loss; P = Postponed

==== Matches ====
Win Draw Loss Fixtures

On 23 June, the league fixtures were announced.

30 July 2022 1	Cheltenham Town	2–3	Peterborough United	Cheltenham
15:00 BST	Kent 30' (o.g.); May 39'; Jackson (yellow card) 48'; Freestone (yellow card) 89'	Report	Fuchs (yellow card) 45+1'; Marriott 59'; Kent (yellow card) 61'; Clarke-Harris 66', 72'	Stadium: Completely-Suzuki Stadium; Attendance: 4,425; Referee: Tom Nield

6 August 2022 2	Barnsley	1–0	Cheltenham Town	Barnsley
15:00 BST	Thomas 66'	Report	Long (yellow card) 9'; Sercombe (yellow card) 16'; Bonds (yellow card) 44'; Adshead (yellow card) 69'	Stadium: Oakwell Stadium; Attendance: 10,289; Referee: Carl Brook

13 August 2022 3	Cheltenham Town	0–2	Portsmouth	Cheltenham
15:00 BST	Nlundulu (yellow card) 25'; Bonds (yellow card) 59'	Report	Bishop 30', 56' (pen.); Dale (yellow card) 78'	Stadium: Whaddon Road Ground; Referee: Alan Young

16 August 2022 4	Fleetwood Town	0–0	Cheltenham Town	Fleetwood
19:45 BST	Vela (yellow card) 35'; Andrew (yellow card) 60'; Rooney (yellow card) 68'; Hayes (yellow card) 81'; Earl (yellow card) 90+6'; Garner (yellow card) 90+8'	Report	Nlundulu (yellow card) 36'; Freestone (yellow card) 82'; Adshead (yellow card) 90'	Stadium: Highbury Stadium; Attendance: 2,510; Referee: Andrew Kitchen

20 August 2022 5	Exeter City	0–1	Cheltenham Town	Exeter
15:00 BST		Report	Nlundulu 56'; Long (yellow card) 77'; Southwood (yellow card) 79'; Williams (yellow card) 80'; Freestone (yellow card) 90+3'	Stadium: St James Park; Attendance: 5,927; Referee: Robert Lewis

27 August 2022 6	Cheltenham Town	1–2	Oxford United	Cheltenham
15:00 BST	Chapman (yellow card) 43' (yellow-red card) 90+3'; Perry 63'; Taylor (yellow card) 84'; Ferry (yellow card) 90'; Lloyd (yellow card) 90+3'; Norton (yellow card) 90+4'	Report	Joseph (yellow card) 61'; Brannagan 66', 86' (pen.), (yellow card) 90+4'; Bodin (yellow card) 70' (yellow-red card) 74'; Taylor (yellow card) 90'	Stadium: Whaddon Road Ground; Attendance: 4,554; Referee: Charles Breakspear

3 September 2022 7	Port Vale	2–2	Cheltenham Town	Burslem
15:00 BST	Odubeko 37'; Perry 40' (o.g.)	Report	Nlundulu 24'; Brown 90+2'	Stadium: Vale Park; Attendance: 6,949; Referee: Rebecca Welch

10 September 2022	Cheltenham Town	Postponed	Bolton Wanderers	Cheltenham
15:00 BST				Stadium: Whaddon Road Ground
Note: Fixture was postponed as a mark of respect following the passing of Queen Elizabeth II.

13 September 2022 8	Cheltenham Town	2–1	Cambridge United	Cheltenham
19:45 BST	Nlundulu 59' (yellow card) 88'; Broom (yellow card) 77'; May 83'; Southwood (yellow card) 90+4'	Report	May 28'; Knibbs (yellow card) 45+1'; Brophy (yellow card) 90+3'	Stadium: Whaddon Road Ground; Attendance: 3,004; Referee: Keith Stroud

17 September 2022 9	Accrington Stanley	1–0	Cheltenham Town	Accrington
15:00 BST	McConville 1'; Astley (yellow card) 76'; Pritchard (yellow card) 81'; Jensen (yellow card) 89'	Report	Jackson (yellow card) 53'; Perry (yellow card) 81'	Stadium: Wham Stadium; Attendance: 1,996; Referee: Steve Martin

24 September 2022	Derby County	Postponed	Cheltenham Town	Derby
15:00 BST				Stadium: Pride Park Stadium
Note: Fixture was postponed due to international call-ups within the Derby County squad.

1 October 2022 10	Cheltenham Town	2–0	Shrewsbury Town	Cheltenham
15:00 BST	Sercombe (yellow card) 24'; Long 45'; May 46'	Report	Flanagan (yellow card) 18'	Stadium: Whaddon Road Ground; Attendance: 3,842; Referee: Carl Brook

4 October 2022 11	Cheltenham Town	1–0	Bolton Wanderers	Cheltenham
19:45 BST	Norton (yellow card) 70'; Broom 87'; Jackson (yellow card) 90+1'	Report	Williams (yellow card) 65'; Thomason (yellow card) 70'	Stadium: Whaddon Road Ground; Attendance: 3,988; Referee: Gavin Ward

8 October 2022 12	Sheffield Wednesday	3–0	Cheltenham Town	Owlerton
15:00 BST	Windass 3'; Bannan 83'; Dele-Bashiru 85'	Report	Freestone (yellow card) 58'; Nlundulu (yellow card) 67'; Perry (yellow card) 74'; Long (yellow card) 88'	Stadium: Hillsborough; Attendance: 22,375; Referee: Ben Speedie

15 October 2022 13	Cheltenham Town	1–4	Bristol Rovers	Cheltenham
15:00 BST	Sercombe 54' (pen.)	Report	Collins 15' 45+2'; Evans 23'; Thomas 42'; Gibson (yellow card) 71'	Stadium: Whaddon Road Ground; Attendance: 5,145; Referee: Sam Barrott

22 October 2022 14	Burton Albion	1–0	Cheltenham Town	Burton upon Trent
15:00 BST	Keillor-Dunn (penalty missed) 45'; Adeboyejo 77'; Taylor (yellow card) 90+5'	Report	Perry (yellow card) 68'; Jackson (yellow card) 90+5'	Stadium: Pirelli Stadium; Attendance: 2,269; Referee: Peter Wright

25 October 2022 15	Cheltenham Town	1–0	Morecambe	Cheltenham
19:45 BST	Williams 35'	Report	Connolly (yellow card) 60'; Rawson (yellow card) 62'; Fané (yellow card) 77'	Stadium: Whaddon Road Ground; Attendance: 3,515; Referee: Scott Oldham

29 October 2022 16	Cheltenham Town	0–0	Milton Keynes Dons	Cheltenham
15:00 BST	Sercombe (yellow card) 70'	Report	Johnson (yellow card) 52'; Harvie (yellow card) 55'; Jules (yellow card) 73'	Stadium: Whaddon Road Ground; Attendance: 3,655; Referee: Darren Drysdale

12 November 2022 17	Ipswich Town	1–1	Cheltenham Town	Ipswich
15:00 GMT	Woolfenden 8'; Morsy (yellow card) 89'	Report	Broom 34'; Southwood (yellow card) 39'; Adshead (yellow card) 86'; Freestone (yellow card) 88'	Stadium: Portman Road; Attendance: 25,400; Referee: Geoff Eltringham

19 November 2022 18	Cheltenham Town	1–0	Wycombe Wanderers	Cheltenham
15:00 GMT	May 26'	Report	Scowen (yellow card) 50'	Stadium: Whaddon Road Ground; Attendance: 4,078; Referee: Marc Edwards

2 December 2022 19	Charlton Athletic	0–1	Cheltenham Town	Charlton
19:45 GMT		Report	Bonds (yellow card) 38'; May 84'; Southwood (yellow card) 90+5'	Stadium: The Valley; Attendance: 12,566; Referee: Alan Young

10 December 2022 20	Forest Green Rovers	1–0	Cheltenham Town	Nailsworth
14:00 GMT	Peart-Harris 75'	Report	Williams (yellow card) 16'; Sercombe (yellow card) 45+1'; Freestone (yellow card) 54'	Stadium: The Bolt New Lawn; Attendance: 4,077; Referee: Tom Reeves

17 December 2022	Cheltenham Town	Postponed	Lincoln City	Cheltenham
15:00 GMT				Stadium: Completely-Suzuki Stadium
Note: Fixture was postponed due to a frozen pitch.

26 December 2022 21	Cheltenham Town	0–1	Plymouth Argyle	Cheltenham
15:00 GMT	Long (yellow card) 38'	Report	Lonwijk (yellow card) 41'; Whittaker 78'	Stadium: Completely-Suzuki Stadium; Attendance: 5,975; Referee: Tom Nield

29 December 2022 22	Shrewsbury Town	0–1	Cheltenham Town	Shrewsbury
19:45 GMT	Shipley (yellow card) 58'; Leahy (red card) 69'	Report	Nlundulu 38', (yellow card) 60'; Raglan (red card) 69'; Norton (yellow card) 87'; Freestone (yellow card) 88'; Bonds (yellow card) 90+6'	Stadium: Montgomery Waters Meadow; Attendance: 6,149; Referee: Sam Purkiss

1 January 2023 23	Bristol Rovers	2–1	Cheltenham Town	Horfield
15:00 GMT	Collins 25'; Coburn 39'; Loft (yellow card) 90+7'	Report	May 48'; Ferry (yellow card) 79'	Stadium: Memorial Stadium; Attendance: 9,649; Referee: Ollie Yates

7 January 2023 24	Morecambe	2–1	Cheltenham Town	Morecambe
15:00 GMT	Weir 20'; Phillips 47'; Cooney (yellow card) 87'; Mayor (yellow card) 90+3'	Report	May 39'; Taylor (yellow card) 80'	Stadium: The Mazuma Stadium; Attendance: 4,677; Referee: Martin Woods

14 January 2023 25	Cheltenham Town	2–3	Derby County	Cheltenham
15:00 GMT	Taylor 2'; Ferry (yellow card) 57'; Williams (yellow card) 68'; May 77'	Report	Hourihane 8'; Bird 11'; Forsyth (yellow card) 19'; Barkhuizen 55'; Collins (yellow card) 84'	Stadium: The Completely Suzuki Stadium; Attendance: 5,666; Referee: Neil Hair

21 January 2023 26	Plymouth Argyle	4–2	Cheltenham Town	Plymouth
15:00 GMT	Scarr 26'; Hardie (yellow card) 28'; Wright 64'; Cosgrove 83'	Report	Perry 40'; May 70'	Stadium: Home Park; Attendance: 16,097

24 January 2023	Cheltenham Town	Postponed	Sheffield Wednesday	Cheltenham
19:45 GMT				Stadium: Completely-Suzuki Stadium
Note: Fixture was postponed due to a frozen pitch.

28 January 2023 27	Cheltenham Town	0–0	Port Vale	Cheltenham
15:00 GMT		Report		Stadium: Completely-Suzuki Stadium; Attendance: 3,929; Referee: Martin Coy

4 February 2023 28	Bolton Wanderers	1–0	Cheltenham Town	Horwich
15:00 GMT	Dempsey 80'; Bradley (yellow card) 84'	Report	Broom (yellow card) 31'; Williams (yellow card) 59'; Keena (yellow card) 86'	Stadium: University of Bolton Stadium; Attendance: 17,736; Referee: Sunny Gill

11 February 2023 29	Cheltenham Town	0–0	Accrington Stanley	Cheltenham
15:00 GMT	Broom (yellow card) 25'; Raglan (yellow card) 90+2'; Taylor (yellow card) 90+8'	Report	Whalley (yellow card) 56'; Coyle (yellow card) 90+6'; Fernandes (yellow card) 90+8'	Stadium: The Completely Suzuki Stadium; Attendance: 4,325; Referee: Will Finnie

14 February 2023 30	Cambridge United	1–2	Cheltenham Town	Cambridge
19:45 GMT	Ironside 61' (pen.); Morrison (yellow card) 72'	Report	Perry (yellow card) 51'; Bonds 57'; Long (yellow card) 60'; Olayinka 79'; May (yellow card) 90+3'	Stadium: Abbey Stadium; Attendance: 5,018 (126 away fans); Referee: Andy Woolmer

18 February 2023 31	Cheltenham Town	0–4	Barnsley	Cheltenham
15:00 GMT		Report	Norwood 8'; Kane 15'; Phillips 36'; Williams 74'	Stadium: The Completely Suzuki Stadium; Attendance: 4,626 (1,021 away); Referee: Declan Bourne

25 February 2023 32	Portsmouth	4–0	Cheltenham Town	Milton
15:00 GMT	Tunnicliffe 5'; Jacobs 20'; Curtis 26'; Ogilvie (yellow card) 60'; Thompson 90+1'	Report	Bonds (yellow card) 14'; Long (yellow card) 29'; Raglan (yellow card) 33'; Keena (yellow card) 41'; Taylor (yellow card) 45+2'	Stadium: Fratton Park; Attendance: 17,504 (366 away); Referee: Lee Swabey

28 February 2023 33	Derby County	2–0	Cheltenham Town	Derby
19:45 GMT	McGoldrick 43'; White (yellow card) 59'; Dobbin 67'; Sibley (yellow card) 87'	Report	Jackson (yellow card) 26'; Rea (yellow card) 55'; Bonds (yellow card) 56'	Stadium: Pride Park Stadium; Attendance: 23,982; Referee: Rebecca Welch

4 March 2023 34	Cheltenham Town	1–0	Fleetwood Town	Cheltenham
15:00 GMT	May 56'; Southwood (yellow card) 90+2'	Report	Warrington (yellow card) 45'; Nsiala (yellow card) 70'; Vela (yellow card) 78'	Stadium: Completely-Suzuki Stadium; Attendance: 3,323 (114 away); Referee: Sam Allison

7 March 2023 35	Cheltenham Town	0–0	Lincoln City	Cheltenham
19:45 GMT	Long (yellow card) 17'; Rea (yellow card) 69'	Report	Diamond (yellow card) 22'	Stadium: Completely-Suzuki Stadium; Attendance: 3,385 (255 away); Referee: Darren Handley

11 March 2023 36	Peterborough United	0–3	Cheltenham Town	Peterborough
15:00 GMT	Kent (yellow card) 72'; Taylor (yellow card) 82'; Poku (yellow card) 86'	Report	Bradbury 15'; May 21', 74'; Bonds (yellow card) 53'; Broom (yellow card) 67'	Stadium: Weston Homes Stadium; Attendance: 8,947 (203 away); Referee: Alan Young

18 March 2023 37	Cheltenham Town	3–1	Exeter City	Cheltenham
15:00 GMT	Keena 17'; Taylor (yellow card) 35', (goal) 74'; Bonds (yellow card) 41'; Southwood (yellow card) 61'; Ferry (yellow card) 65'; May 79'; Broom (yellow card) 90+3'	Report	Nombe (penalty missed) 12', (yellow card) 90+2'; Key 69'; Aimson (yellow card) 90+3'	Stadium: The Completely Suzuki Stadium; Attendance: 5,102 (1,330 away); Referee: Anthony Backhouse

25 March 2023	Oxford United	Postponed	Cheltenham Town	Littlemore
15:00 GMT				Stadium: The Kassam Stadium
Note: Fixture was postponed due to international call-ups in the squad.

29 March 2023 38	Cheltenham Town	2–2	Sheffield Wednesday	Cheltenham
19:45 GMT	Taylor (yellow card) 45'; Broom (yellow card) 52'; Keena 62'; May 69'	Report	Palmer (yellow card) 39'; Flint 76'; Gregory 87'	Stadium: The Completely Suzuki Stadium; Attendance: 5,433, (1,487 away); Referee: Paul Howard

1 April 2023 39	Cheltenham Town	0–0	Burton Albion	Cheltenham
15:00 BST	Ferry (yellow card) 2'; Rea (yellow card) 69'; Bradbury (yellow card) 80'	Report		Stadium: The Completely Suzuki Stadium; Attendance: 3,864 (322 away); Referee: Ollie Yates

7 April 2023 40	Lincoln City	2–0	Cheltenham Town	Lincoln
15:00 BST	House 42', 79'	Report	Long (yellow card) 90+5'	Stadium: LNER Stadium; Attendance: 8,178 (213 away); Referee: Andrew Kitchen

10 April 2023 41	Cheltenham Town	1–1	Ipswich Town	Cheltenham
15:00 BST	Bradbury (yellow card) 7'; May 84'; Elliott (yellow card) off pitch'	Report	Morsy (yellow card) 36'; Chaplin 64'	Stadium: The Completely Suzuki Stadium; Attendance: 5,445 (1,509 away); Referee: Seb Stockbridge

15 April 2023 42	Milton Keynes Dons	2–2	Cheltenham Town	Denbigh
15:00 BST	Eisa 45+2', 59' (pen.); Lewington (yellow card) 90+2'	Report	Bonds 12'; Long (yellow card) 32'; May (penalty missed) 70', 90+7', (yellow card) 90+8'	Stadium: Stadium MK; Attendance: 6,974; Referee: Ben Toner

22 April 2023 43	Cheltenham Town	3–1	Forest Green Rovers	Cheltenham
15:00 BST	May 14', 38', (yellow card) 74'; Keena 32'; Long (yellow card) 50'; Bonds (yellow card) 71'; Freestone (yellow card) 76'	Report	Cooper (yellow card) 26'; Garrick 48'; McGeouch (yellow card) 55'	Stadium: The Completely Suzuki Stadium; Attendance: 5,901 (700 away); Referee: Neil Hair

25 April 2023 44	Oxford United	4–0	Cheltenham Town	Littlemore
19:45 BST	Goodrham 38'; Joseph 52'; Browne 60', 65'	Report	Broom (yellow card) 45+3'; Ferry (yellow card) 75'; Rea (yellow card) 86'	Stadium: The Kassam Stadium; Attendance: 7,757 (426 away); Referee: Will Finnie

29 April 2023 45	Wycombe Wanderers	0–3	Cheltenham Town	High Wycombe
15:00 BST	Forino-Joseph (yellow card) 78'	Report	Keena 37' (pen.), (yellow card) 78', (goal) 88'; Rea (yellow card) 61'; May 68'; Ferry (yellow card) 86'	Stadium: Adams Park; Attendance: 5,188 (391 away); Referee: Ross Joyce

7 May 2023 46	Cheltenham Town	2–2	Charlton Athletic	Cheltenham
12:00 BST	Keena 50'; May 88'	Report	Fraser 34'; Payne 83'	Stadium: Completely-Suzuki Stadium; Attendance: 5,336; Referee: Tom Nield

=== FA Cup ===
The Robins were drawn at home to Alvechurch in the first round.

Win Draw Loss Fixtures

5 November 2022 First round	Cheltenham Town	1–2	Alvechurch	Cheltenham
15:00 GMT	Jackson 54'; Sercombe (yellow card) 62'; Long (yellow card) 75'; Nlundulu (yellow card) 82'; May (yellow card) 87'	Report	Waldron 19', 50' (yellow card) 21'; Willets (yellow card) 69'; Sephton (yellow card) 90'	Stadium: Whaddon Road Ground; Attendance: 4,406; Referee: Robert Lewis

=== EFL Cup ===
Win Draw Loss Fixtures

9 August 2022 First round	Cheltenham Town	0–7	Exeter City	Cheltenham
19:45 BST	Lloyd (yellow card) 38'; Horton (yellow card) 63'	Report	Nombe 23', 35'; Collins 26'; Jay 28'; Sparkes 45+1'; Kite 50'; Coley 84'	Stadium: Whaddon Road Ground; Attendance: 2,552; Referee: Will Finnie

=== EFL Trophy ===
On 20 June, the initial Group stage draw was made, grouping Cheltenham Town with Milton Keynes Dons and Walsall.

Pos	Div	Team	Pld	W	PW	PL	L	GF	GA	GD	Pts	Qualification
1	L1	Milton Keynes Dons	3	2	0	0	1	5	2	+3	6	Advance to Round 2
2	L1	Cheltenham Town	3	2	0	0	1	5	4	+1	6	Advance to Round 2
3	ACA	West Ham United U21	3	2	0	0	1	3	3	0	6	
4	L2	Walsall	3	0	0	0	3	1	5	−4	0	

Source: EFL.com

Win Draw Loss Fixtures

30 August 2022 Group stage	Milton Keynes Dons	1–2	Cheltenham Town	Denbigh
19:00 BST	Oyegoke (yellow card) 7'; Gyamfi (yellow card) 17'; Jules 43'	Report	May 8' (pen.); Raglan (yellow card) 12'; Horton (yellow card) 33'; Barkers (yellow card) 42'; Brown 54'	Stadium: Stadium:mk; Attendance: 1,626; Referee: Lee Swabey

20 September 2022 Group stage	Cheltenham Town	2–1	Walsall	Cheltenham
19:00 BST	Perry (yellow card) 9'; Nlundulu 38', (yellow card) 46'; Sercombe 43'; May (yellow card) 89'	Report	White (yellow card) 46'; Johnson 86'	Stadium: Whaddon Road Ground; Attendance: 1,275; Referee: Tom Reeves

18 October 2022 Group stage	Cheltenham Town	1–2	West Ham United U21	Cheltenham
19:00 BST	Brown 16'; Chapman (yellow card) 83'; Bonds (yellow card) 90+2'	Report	Greenidge 34'; Casey (yellow card) 45+1'; Potts 49' (yellow card) 65'; Forson (yellow card) 90+4'	Stadium: Whaddon Road Ground; Attendance: 1,526; Referee: Thomas Kirk

22 November 2022 Second round	Forest Green Rovers	1–1 (3–4 p)	Cheltenham Town	Nailsworth
19:00 GMT	Peart-Harris (yellow card) 17'; March 24' (yellow card) 32'	Report	Taylor (yellow card) 32'; Broom 69'	Stadium: The innocent New Lawn Stadium; Attendance: 1,425; Referee: Sunny Gill
	Penalties
	Peart-Harris (penalty scored); Wickham (penalty missed); O'Keeffe (penalty scored); Bunker (penalty scored); March (penalty missed)		Sercombe (penalty scored); Bonds (penalty scored); Brown (penalty scored); Broom (penalty scored)

13 December 2022 Third round	Cheltenham Town	4–0	Chelsea U21	Cheltenham
19:00 GMT	Brown 4', (yellow card) 80', (goal) 90'; Raglan (yellow card) 9'; Broom (yellow card) 59', (goal) 90+4'; Sercombe 87'	Report	Flower (yellow card) 29'; Brooking (yellow card) 90+2'	Stadium: The Completely Suzuki Stadium; Attendance: 1,058; Referee: Simon Mather

10 January 2023 Quarter-final	Cheltenham Town	3–1	Salford City	Cheltenham
19:45 GMT	Southwood (yellow card) 36'; Broom 45'; Bradbury (yellow card) 45+3'; Taylor (yellow card) 55'; Sercombe 65'; Goodwin 66'	Report	Hendry 13'; Vassell (yellow card) 45+3'	Stadium: The Completely Suzuki Stadium; Attendance: 1,874; Referee: Carl Brook

22 February 2023 Semi-final	Plymouth Argyle	1–1 (3–2 p)	Cheltenham Town	Plymouth
20:00 GMT	Galloway (yellow card) 24'; Hardie 63'; Bolton (yellow card) 90+2'	Report	May 49', (yellow card) 53'; Keena (yellow card) 64'; Jackson (yellow card) 75'; Long (yellow card) 80'	Stadium: Home Park; Attendance: 12,047 (236 away); Referee: Robert Lewis
	Penalties
	Hardie (penalty scored); Cosgrove (penalty scored); Azaz (penalty missed); Gillesphey (penalty scored); Houghton (penalty missed)		Sercombe (penalty scored); Brown (penalty scored); Broom (penalty missed); Bonds (penalty missed); May (penalty missed)
