= Adulai Sambu =

Portuguese footballer

Personal information
- Date of birth: 28 June 2004 (age 22)
- Place of birth: Lisbon, Portugal
- Position: Midfielder

Team information
- Current team: Bishop's Cleeve

Youth career
- Cheltenham Town

Senior career*
| Years | Team | Apps | (Gls) |
| 2022–2024 | Cheltenham Town | 3 | (0) |
| 2022 | → Cirencester Town (loan) | 7 | (5) |
| 2022 | → Redditch United (loan) | 4 | (0) |
| 2023 | → Stratford Town (loan) | 2 | (0) |
| 2023 | → Cirencester Town (loan) | 20 | (15) |
| 2023–2024 | → Hungerford Town (loan) | 28 | (9) |
| 2024 | Rushall Olympic | 1 | (0) |
| 2024 | → Hungerford Town (dual-registration) | 3 | (0) |
| 2025–2026 | Merthyr Town | 28 | (1) |
| 2025–2026 | Yate Town | 5 | (0) |
| 2026– | Bishop's Cleeve | 0 | (0) |
- * Club domestic league appearances and goals as of 12:14, 7 January 2025 (UTC)

Adulai Sambu (born 28 June 2004) is a Portuguese professional footballer who plays as a midfielder for Southern League Division One South club Bishop's Cleeve.

== Early life ==
Sambu was born in Lisbon, Portugal to Bissau-Guinean parents, and moved to England at the age of 4.

== Playing career ==
Sambu made his first-team debut for Cheltenham Town on 30 August 2022, coming on as an 81st-minute substitute for Charlie Brown in a 2–1 win away at Milton Keynes Dons.

Sambu then went on to make his first team full debut for Cheltenham Town on 18 October 2022, His strong performance against the Hammers West ham United encouraged fans to vote for him as their Man of the match Which he comfortably won.

In March 2023, Sambu joined Cirencester Town on a work-experience loan until the end of the season.

In September 2023, Sambu joined Hungerford Town on an initial one-month loan deal.

On 30 April 2024 Cheltenham announced he would be leaving the club at the end of the season.

On 3 October 2024 it was rumoured that Sambu had signed with National League North club Rushall Olympic to combine part time football with a role within the Cheltenham Town academy.

In January 2025, Sambu joined Merthyr Town.

In February 2026, he joined Bishop's Cleeve.

== Honours ==
Merthyr Town

- Southern League Premier Division South Champion: 2024-2025

== Career statistics ==
As of match played 26 August 2023

Appearances and goals by club, season and competition
| Club | Season | League | | | FA Cup | | EFL Cup | | Other | | Total | |
| Club | Season | Division | Apps | Goals | Apps | Goals | Apps | Goals | Apps | Goals | Apps | Goals |
|---|---|---|---|---|---|---|---|---|---|---|---|---|
| Cheltenham Town | 2022–23 | League One | 1 | 0 | 0 | 0 | 0 | 0 | 2 (Note: Appearance(s) in EFL Trophy) | 0 | 3 | 0 |
| Cheltenham Town | 2023–24 | League One | 2 | 0 | 0 | 0 | 1 | 0 | 0 | 0 | 3 | 0 |
| Cheltenham Town | Total | | 3 | 0 | 0 | 0 | 1 | 0 | 2 | 0 | 6 | 0 |
| Cirencester Town (loan) | 2022–23 | Southern League; Division One Central | 14 | 10 | 3 | 1 | — | | 3 (Note: Appearances in FA Trophy) | 4 | 20 | 15 |
| Redditch United (loan) | 2022–23 | Southern League; Premier Division Central | 4 | 0 | — | | — | | — | | 4 | 0 |
| Stratford Town (loan) | 2022–23 | Southern League; Premier Division Central | 2 | 0 | — | | — | | — | | 2 | 0 |
| Career total | | | 23 | 10 | 3 | 1 | 1 | 0 | 5 | 4 | 32 | 15 |
