= James Olayinka =

English footballer

Personal information
- Full name: Olujimi James Ayodele Olayinka
- Date of birth: 5 October 2000 (age 26)
- Place of birth: Lambeth, England
- Height: 5 ft 9 in (1.75 m)
- Position: Midfielder

Team information
- Current team: Derry City
- Number: 28

Youth career
- –2019: Arsenal

Senior career*
| Years | Team | Apps | (Gls) |
| 2019–2022 | Arsenal | 0 | (0) |
| 2020 | → Northampton Town (loan) | 1 | (0) |
| 2020–2021 | → Southend United (loan) | 20 | (2) |
| 2022–2024 | Cheltenham Town | 38 | (1) |
| 2025 | Waterford | 31 | (1) |
| 2026– | Derry City | 26 | (1) |
- * Club domestic league appearances and goals as of 16:10, 9 November 2026 (UTC)

Olujimi James Ayodele Olayinka (born 5 October 2000) is an English professional footballer who plays as a midfielder for League of Ireland Premier Division club Derry City.

== Career ==
=== Arsenal ===
Olayinka began his career with Arsenal. He signed his first professional contract with the club in January 2019.

On 29 August 2020, Olayinka was named an unused substitute in the 2020 FA Community Shield, with Arsenal clinching a 5–4 victory over Liverpool in the penalty shootout after the match finished 1–1 after 90 minutes.

==== Loan to Northampton Town ====
In January 2020, Olayinka moved on loan to League Two side Northampton Town until the end of the season, making his debut in a 3–0 win over Scunthorpe United on 28 January. He helped Northampton Town to secure promotion to League One by winning the play-off final.

==== Loan to Southend United ====
In October 2020 he joined Southend United on loan until January 2021. He scored his first goal for the club, and his first professional goal, in an FA Cup tie against Boreham Wood on 7 November 2020. On 1 February 2021, Olayinka extended his loan with Southend United to the end of the 2020–21 season.

=== Cheltenham Town ===
He signed a two-year contract with Cheltenham Town on 1 September 2022. On 2 January 2024, manager Darrell Clarke announced that Olayinka had been made available for transfer. He was released by the club at the end of the 2023–24 season.

=== Waterford ===
On 14 November 2024, it was announced that Olayinka would be joining League of Ireland Premier Division club Waterford ahead of their 2025 season. On 21 November 2025, it was announced that he would be departing the club at the end of his contract, having made 33 appearances and scored one goal in all competitions.

=== Derry City ===
On 15 December 2025, League of Ireland Premier Division club Derry City announced that Olayinka would join the club on a free transfer ahead of the 2026 season, signing a two-year contract. On 9 July 2026 he scored Derry's second goal in a 3–2 defeat away to CSKA Sofia in the UEFA Europa League, the first European goal of his career.

== Personal life ==
Olayinka is of Nigerian descent.

== Career statistics ==
As of match played 30 October 2026

Appearances and goals by club, season and competition
| Club | Season | League | | | National Cup (Note: Includes FA Cup & FAI Cup) | | League Cup (Note: Includes EFL Cup) | | Other | | Total | |
| Club | Season | Division | Apps | Goals | Apps | Goals | Apps | Goals | Apps | Goals | Apps | Goals |
|---|---|---|---|---|---|---|---|---|---|---|---|---|
| Arsenal U21 | 2018–19 | | — | | — | | — | | 4 (Note: Appearance(s) in the EFL Trophy.) | 0 | 4 | 0 |
| Arsenal U21 | 2019–20 | | — | | — | | — | | 2 | 1 | 2 | 1 |
| Arsenal U21 | 2020–21 | | — | | — | | — | | 2 | 0 | 2 | 0 |
| Arsenal U21 | 2021–22 | | — | | — | | — | | 3 | 2 | 3 | 2 |
| Arsenal U21 | 2022–23 | | — | | — | | — | | 1 | 0 | 1 | 0 |
| Arsenal U21 | Total | | — | | — | | — | | 12 | 3 | 12 | 3 |
| Arsenal | 2019–20 | Premier League | 0 | 0 | 0 | 0 | 0 | 0 | 0 | 0 | 0 | 0 |
| Arsenal | 2020–21 | Premier League | 0 | 0 | 0 | 0 | 0 | 0 | 0 | 0 | 0 | 0 |
| Arsenal | 2021–22 | Premier League | 0 | 0 | 0 | 0 | 0 | 0 | 0 | 0 | 0 | 0 |
| Arsenal | Total | | 0 | 0 | 0 | 0 | 0 | 0 | 0 | 0 | 0 | 0 |
| Northampton Town (loan) | 2019–20 | League Two | 1 | 0 | 0 | 0 | 0 | 0 | 3 (Note: Appearances in the League Two play-offs.) | 0 | 4 | 0 |
| Southend United (loan) | 2020–21 | League Two | 20 | 2 | 1 | 1 | 0 | 0 | 0 | 0 | 21 | 3 |
| Cheltenham Town | 2022–23 | League One | 27 | 1 | 1 | 0 | 0 | 0 | 0 | 0 | 28 | 1 |
| Cheltenham Town | 2023–24 | League One | 11 | 0 | 0 | 0 | 1 | 0 | 3 | 0 | 15 | 0 |
| Cheltenham Town | Total | | 38 | 1 | 1 | 0 | 1 | 0 | 3 | 0 | 43 | 1 |
| Waterford | 2025 | LOI Premier Division | 31 | 1 | 1 | 0 | – | | 1 (Note: Appearance in the 2025 League of Ireland Premier Division Promotion/Relegation play-off) | 0 | 33 | 1 |
| Derry City | 2026 | LOI Premier Division | 26 | 1 | 4 | 0 | – | | 1 (Note: Appearances in the UEFA Europa League) | 1 | 31 | 2 |
| Career total | | | 116 | 5 | 7 | 1 | 1 | 0 | 20 | 4 | 144 | 10 |

== Honours ==
Northampton Town

- EFL League Two play-offs: 2020

Arsenal

- FA Community Shield: 2020

Derry City

- FAI Cup: 2026
