= Will Ferry =

Irish footballer

- Ferry with Dundee United in 2026

Personal information
- Full name: William Ferry
- Date of birth: 7 December 2000 (age 25)
- Place of birth: Bury, England
- Height: 5 ft 9 in (1.76 m)
- Position: Full-back

Team information
- Current team: Dundee United
- Number: 11

Youth career
- Bury
- 2017–2021: Southampton

Senior career*
Years	Team	Apps	(Gls)
2021–2022	Southampton	0	(0)
2021–2022	→ Crawley Town (loan)	36	(1)
2022–2024	Cheltenham Town	75	(2)
2024–	Dundee United	74	(5)

International career^{‡}
2017	Republic of Ireland U18	3	(0)
2018–2019	Republic of Ireland U19	5	(2)
2020–2021	Republic of Ireland U21	9	(0)
2026–	Republic of Ireland	1	(0)
- * Club domestic league appearances and goals as of 16:13, 19 September 2026 (UTC) ‡ National team caps and goals as of 19:11, 16 May 2026 (UTC)

William Ferry (born 7 December 2000) is a professional footballer who plays as a full-back for Scottish Premiership club Dundee United. Born in England, he plays for the Republic of Ireland national team.

== Club career ==
Born in Bury, Ferry spent his early career with Bury and Southampton, turning professional in 2017. He signed a new two-year contract with Southampton in August 2021 and immediately moved on loan to Crawley Town.

In August 2022 he signed for Cheltenham Town on a two-year contract. Following relegation at the end of the 2023–24 season, Ferry was offered a new contract to remain with the club.

On 6 June 2024, Ferry agreed to join Scottish Premiership club Dundee United on a three-year deal from the expiration of his contract with Cheltenham Town. He scored his first professional goal for United on 22 March 2026 in a 2–0 win against Celtic.

== International career ==
Ferry is a former Republic of Ireland under-18, under-19 and under-21 international. On 6 October 2025, he received his first senior Republic of Ireland call-up, replacing the injured Callum O'Dowda in the squad for the 2026 FIFA World Cup qualifiers against Portugal and Armenia. On 16 May 2026, Ferry made his senior Republic of Ireland debut, replacing Tayo Adaramola from the bench in a 5–0 win over Grenada in a friendly.

== Career statistics ==
=== Club ===
As of 19 September 2026

Appearances and goals by club, season and competition
Club	Season	League			National cup (Note: Includes FA Cup, Scottish Cup)		League cup (Note: Includes EFL Cup, Scottish League Cup)		Other		Total	
Club	Season	Division	Apps	Goals	Apps	Goals	Apps	Goals	Apps	Goals	Apps	Goals
Southampton U21	2020–21	—			—		—		1 (Note: Appearance(s) in EFL Trophy)	0	1	0
Southampton	2021–22	Premier League	0	0	0	0	0	0	0	0	0	0
Crawley Town (loan)	2021–22	League Two	36	1	1	0	1	0	0	0	38	1
Cheltenham Town	2022–23	League One	32	0	0	0	1	0	3	0	36	0
Cheltenham Town	2023–24	League One	43	2	1	0	0	0	2	0	46	2
Cheltenham Town	Total		75	2	1	0	1	0	5	0	82	2
Dundee United	2024–25	Scottish Premiership	35	0	1	0	6	0	0	0	42	0
Dundee United	2025–26	Scottish Premiership	33	4	3	0	1	0	4 (Note: Appearances in the UEFA Conference League)	0	41	4
Dundee United	2026–27	Scottish Premiership	6	1	0	0	2	0	0	0	8	1
Dundee United	Total		74	5	4	0	9	0	4	0	91	5
Career total			185	8	6	0	11	0	10	0	212	8

=== International ===
As of match played on 16 May 2026

Appearances and goals by national team and year
National team	Year	Apps	Goals
Republic of Ireland
Republic of Ireland	2026	1	0
Total		1	0
