= Nathan Butler-Oyedeji =

English footballer (born 2003)

Personal information
- Full name: Nathan Jerome Chatoyer Butler-Oyedeji
- Date of birth: 4 January 2003 (age 23)
- Place of birth: Waltham Forest, England
- Height: 1.77 m (5 ft 10 in)
- Position: Striker

Team information
- Current team: Lausanne-Sport
- Number: 11

Youth career
- 2011–2022: Arsenal

Senior career*
Years	Team	Apps	(Gls)
2022–2025	Arsenal	1	(0)
2023	→ Accrington Stanley (loan)	11	(0)
2023–2024	→ Cheltenham Town (loan)	13	(0)
2025–	Lausanne-Sport	41	(5)
- * Club domestic league appearances and goals as of 28 September 2026

Nathan Jerome Chatoyer Butler-Oyedeji (born 4 January 2003) is an English professional footballer who plays as a striker for Swiss Super League side Lausanne-Sport.

== Career ==
Born in London, Butler-Oyedeji joined Arsenal at the age of 8, turning professional in 2021. He spent time training with the Arsenal first team, before moving on loan to Accrington Stanley in January 2023.

On 1 September 2023, he signed with EFL League One club Cheltenham Town on a season-long loan.

He made his senior debut for Arsenal on 22 January 2025, replacing Gabriel Martinelli as a late substitute in a 3–0 win over Dinamo Zagreb in the UEFA Champions League. Butler-Oyedeji made his Premier League debut on 20 April 2025, coming off the bench in a 4–0 win away to Ipswich Town.

Provided limited playing opportunities, he was released by Arsenal at the end of their 2024–25 campaign.

On 2 July 2025, he signed for Lausanne-Sport on a three-year contract with the Swiss club.

== Personal life ==
Butler-Oyedeji is of Nigerian descent through his father, and Vincentian descent through his mother.

== Career statistics ==
As of 2 October 2025

Appearances and goals by club, season and competition
Club	Season	League			National cup		League cup		Other		Total	
Club	Season	Division	Apps	Goals	Apps	Goals	Apps	Goals	Apps	Goals	Apps	Goals
Arsenal	2022–23	Premier League	0	0	0	0	0	0	0	0	0	0
Arsenal	2023–24	Premier League	0	0	0	0	0	0	0	0	0	0
Arsenal	2024–25	Premier League	1	0	0	0	0	0	1 (Note: Appearance in UEFA Champions League)	0	2	0
Arsenal	Total		1	0	0	0	0	0	1	0	2	0
Accrington Stanley (loan)	2022–23	League One	11	0	0	0	0	0	0	0	11	0
Cheltenham Town (loan)	2023–24	League One	13	0	1	0	0	0	0	0	14	0
Lausanne-Sport	2025–26	Swiss Super League	7	0	1	0	0	0	7 (Note: Appearances in UEFA Conference League)	1	15	1
Career total			32	0	2	0	0	0	8	1	42	1
