= Tom Bradbury =

English footballer (born 1998)

Personal information
- Full name: Thomas Garry James Bradbury
- Date of birth: 27 February 1998 (age 28)
- Place of birth: Aylesbury, England
- Height: 6 ft 3 in (1.90 m)
- Position: Centre-back

Team information
- Current team: Harrogate Town
- Number: 5

Youth career
- Milton Keynes Dons

Senior career*
Years	Team	Apps	(Gls)
2016–2017	Ware	26	(0)
2017–2018	Banbury United	46	(3)
2018–2019	Dundee	0	(0)
2019	→ York City (loan)	3	(0)
2019–2020	Yeovil Town	19	(1)
2020–2022	FC Halifax Town	68	(5)
2022–2025	Cheltenham Town	74	(2)
2025–	Harrogate Town	9	(0)
- * Club domestic league appearances and goals as of 19:05, 26 December 2025 (UTC)

Thomas Garry James Bradbury (born 27 February 1998) is an English professional footballer who plays as a centre-back for National League club Harrogate Town.

== Career ==
Born in Aylesbury, Bradbury played youth football with Milton Keynes Dons, and in non-league football for Ware and Banbury United. He turned professional with Scottish club Dundee in July 2018. He then played for York City, Yeovil Town and FC Halifax Town.

Bradbury signed for Cheltenham Town in June 2022, and scored his first EFL goal in a 3–0 away win against Peterborough United.

He rejected a new contract with Cheltenham at the end of the 2024–25 season, and it was announced that he would join Harrogate Town on 1 July 2025.

== Personal life ==
Bradbury is a Christian.

== Career statistics ==
As of match played 26 December 2025

Appearances and goals by club, season and competition
Club	Season	League			National Cup		League Cup		Other		Total	
Club	Season	Division	Apps	Goals	Apps	Goals	Apps	Goals	Apps	Goals	Apps	Goals
Ware	2016–17	Isthmian League; Division One North	26	0	0	0	—		12	1	38	1
Banbury United	2016–17	Southern League; Premier Division	12	0	0	0	—		2 (Note: Appearances in Oxfordshire Senior Cup)	0	14	0
Banbury United	2017–18	Southern League; Premier Division	34	3	1	0	—		8 (Note: Four appearances in FA Trophy, three appearances and one goal Oxfordshire Senior Cup, one appearance in Southern Football League Cup)	1	43	4
Banbury United	Total		46	3	1	0	—		10	1	57	4
Dundee	2018–19	Scottish Premiership	0	0	0	0	0	0	—		0	0
Dundee U21	2018–19	—			—		—		2 (Note: Appearances in Scottish Challenge Cup)	1	2	1
York City (loan)	2018–19	National League North	3	0	0	0	—		0	0	3	0
Yeovil Town	2019–20	National League	19	1	1	0	—		3 (Note: Two appearances in FA Trophy, one in Somerset Premier Cup)	1	23	2
FC Halifax Town	2020–21	National League	35	3	0	0	—		1 (Note: Appearance in FA Trophy)	0	36	3
FC Halifax Town	2021–22	National League	33	2	2	0	—		3	1	38	3
FC Halifax Town	Total		68	5	2	0	—		4	1	74	6
Cheltenham Town	2022–23	League One	13	1	0	0	1	0	4 (Note: Appearance(s) in the EFL Trophy)	0	18	1
Cheltenham Town	2023–24	League One	22	0	0	0	0	0	3	0	25	0
Cheltenham Town	2024–25	League Two	39	1	2	0	0	0	4	0	45	1
Cheltenham Town	Total		74	2	2	0	1	0	11	0	88	2
Harrogate Town	2025–26	League Two	9	0	0	0	0	0	1	0	10	0
Career total			245	11	6	0	1	0	43	5	295	16
