= Elliot Bonds =

Footballer (born 2000)

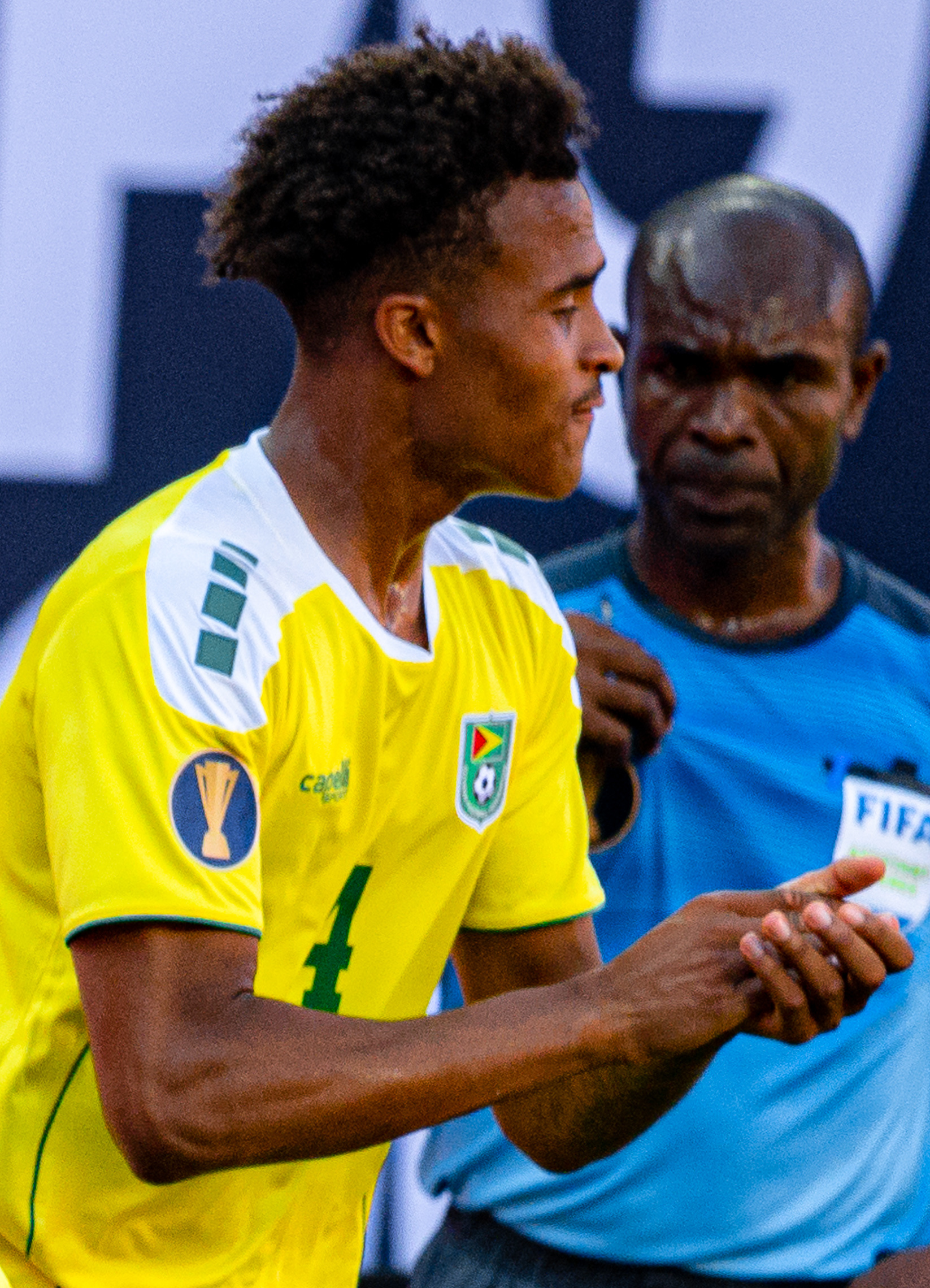
- Bonds with Guyana at the 2019 CONCACAF Gold Cup

Personal information
- Full name: Elliot Michael Bonds
- Date of birth: 23 March 2000 (age 26)
- Place of birth: Brent, England
- Height: 6 ft 4 in (1.93 m)
- Position: Defensive midfielder

Team information
- Current team: Salford City
- Number: 16

Youth career
- Reading
- Brentford
- 2016–2018: Dagenham & Redbridge

Senior career*
Years	Team	Apps	(Gls)
2018–2019	Dagenham & Redbridge	6	(0)
2018–2019	→ Farnborough (loan)	18	(1)
2019–2021	Hull City	0	(0)
2020–2021	→ Cheltenham Town (loan)	5	(0)
2021–2024	Cheltenham Town	98	(5)
2021	→ Kidderminster Harriers (loan)	7	(0)
2024–2026	Fleetwood Town	43	(2)
2026–	Salford City	0	(0)

International career^{‡}
2018–	Guyana	27	(2)
- * Club domestic league appearances and goals as of 23:16, 12 October 2025 (UTC) ‡ National team caps and goals as of 11:54, 1 December 2025 (UTC)

Elliot Michael Bonds (born 23 March 2000) is a professional footballer who plays as a defensive midfielder for EFL League Two club Salford City. Born in England, he plays for the Guyana national team.

== Club career ==
Bonds originates from Kensal Rise, London and attended Oakington Manor School in Wembley. He has represented Middlesex and the Brent Schools' FA at various levels and was scouted by Eamonn Dolan for Reading. He also had a spell in the youth team of Brentford. In the summer of 2016 he signed a two-year scholarship with Dagenham & Redbridge. He was a part of the side that reached the FA Youth Cup fourth-round in the 2017–18 season.

He was rewarded with his first team debut in February 2018 when he replaced Fejiri Okenabirhie as a substitute in the 3–0 win over Torquay United, becoming the club's youngest ever senior player, aged 18. He made his first senior start in the 5–3 away win at Guiseley in April 2018. He made five first team appearances that season despite being a second-year scholar. In June 2018 he signed his first professional contract, a two-year deal until 2020. In December 2018, he was sent out on loan to Southern Football League Premier Division side Farnborough.

On 20 August 2019, Bonds joined Hull City on a one-year deal, with the club holding the option of a further year and initially joined up with the under-23 squad.

On 20 August 2020, Bonds joined Cheltenham Town on a season-long loan.

Bonds returned to Hull after rupturing his anterior cruciate ligament that put at end to his Cheltenham loan.

On 29 June 2021, Bonds signed a two-year contract with Cheltenham Town. On 20 October 2021, Bonds joined National League North side Kidderminster Harriers on loan until December. On 3 December 2021, the loan was extended by a further month until January 2022. In July 2022, Bonds signed a contract extension with Cheltenham until 2025.

On 28 June 2024, Bonds signed a three-year deal with Fleetwood Town.

=== Salford City ===
On July 14, 2026, Bonds joined fellow EFL League Two club Salford City for an undisclosed fee.

== International career ==
Bonds received his first call-up to the Guyana national team in November 2018 for the 2019–20 CONCACAF Nations League qualifier against French Guiana. He played the full ninety-minutes in the 2–1 defeat.

== Career statistics ==
=== Club ===
As of match played 3 May 2025

Appearances and goals by club, season and competition
Club	Season	League			FA Cup		EFL Cup		Other		Total	
Club	Season	Division	Apps	Goals	Apps	Goals	Apps	Goals	Apps	Goals	Apps	Goals
Dagenham & Redbridge	2017–18	National League	5	0	0	0	—		0	0	5	0
Dagenham & Redbridge	2018–19	National League	1	0	0	0	—		0	0	1	0
Dagenham & Redbridge	Total		6	0	0	0	—		0	0	6	0
Farnborough (loan)	2018–19	SL Premier Division	18	1	0	0	—		0	0	18	1
Hull City	2019–20	Championship	0	0	0	0	0	0	—		0	0
Hull City	2020–21	League One	0	0	0	0	0	0	0	0	0	0
Hull City	Total		0	0	0	0	0	0	0	0	0	0
Cheltenham Town (loan)	2020–21	League Two	5	0	0	0	1	0	2 (Note: Appearance(s) in EFL Trophy)	0	8	0
Cheltenham Town	2021–22	League One	23	1	0	0	1	0	2	0	26	1
Cheltenham Town	2022–23	League One	37	2	—		1	0	4	0	42	2
Cheltenham Town	2023–24	League One	38	2	—		—		—		38	2
Cheltenham Town	Total		103	5	0	0	3	0	8	0	114	5
Kidderminster Harriers (loan)	2021–22	National League North	7	0	2	0	—		2 (Note: Appearance(s) in FA Trophy)	0	11	0
Fleetwood Town	2024–25	League Two	33	0	1	0	3	0	0	0	37	0
Career total			167	6	3	0	6	0	10	0	186	6

=== International ===
As of match played 25 March 2025

Appearances and goals by national team and year
National team	Year	Apps	Goals
Guyana	2018	1	0
Guyana	2019	6	0
Guyana	2023	8	0
Guyana	2024	6	0
Guyana	2025	2	0
	2026	4	2
Total		23	0
