= Daniel Adshead =

English footballer (born 2001)

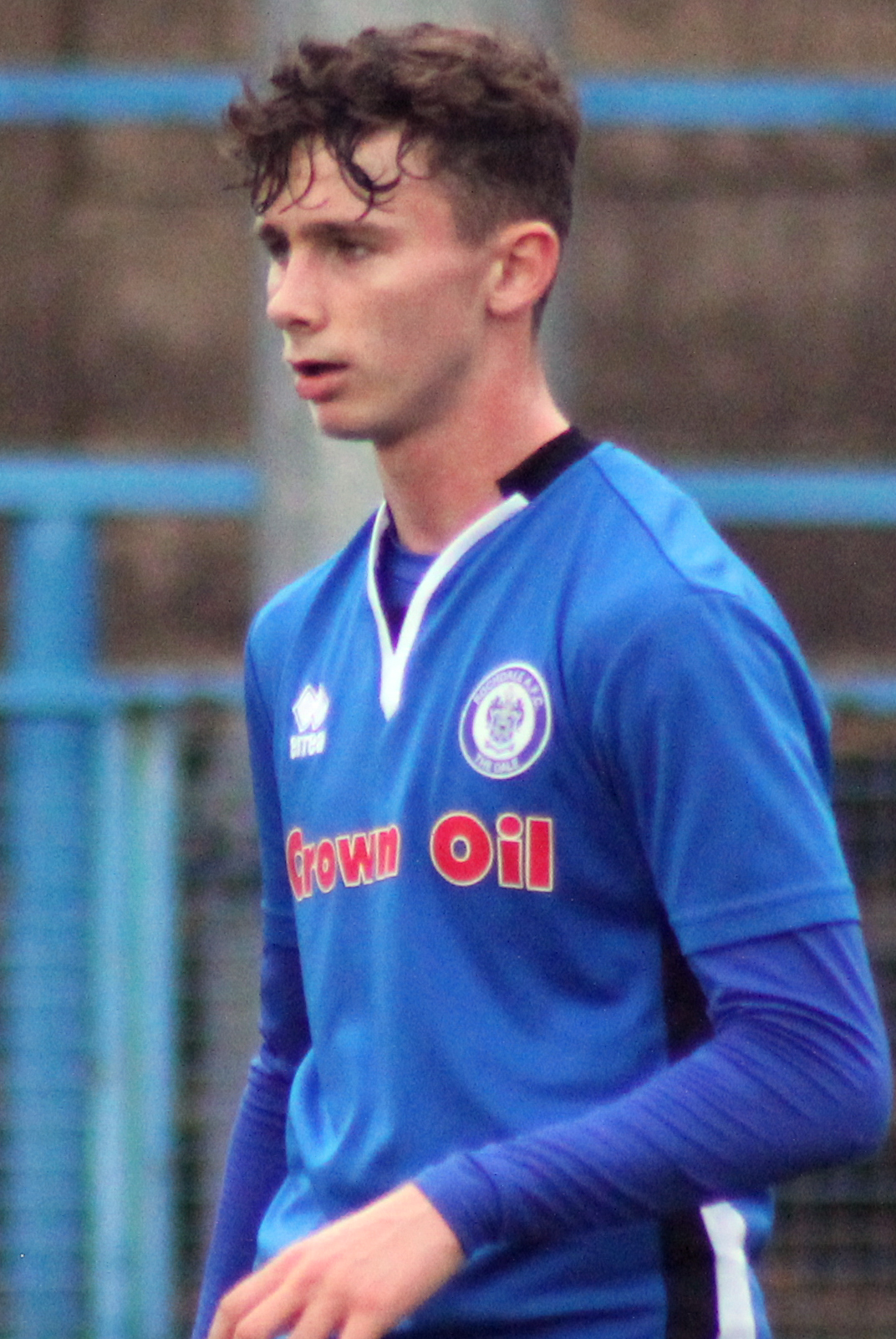
- Adshead playing for Rochdale in 2017

Personal information
- Full name: Daniel Adshead
- Date of birth: 2 September 2001 (age 25)
- Place of birth: Manchester, England
- Height: 1.78 m (5 ft 10 in)
- Position: Midfielder

Team information
- Current team: Boston United
- Number: 25

Youth career
- –2017: Rochdale

Senior career*
Years	Team	Apps	(Gls)
2017–2019	Rochdale	11	(0)
2019–2022	Norwich City	0	(0)
2020–2021	→ Telstar (loan)	28	(0)
2021	→ Gillingham (loan)	15	(0)
2022–2024	Cheltenham Town	15	(0)
2023	→ Rochdale (loan)	0	(0)
2023–2024	→ AFC Fylde (loan)	19	(0)
2024–	Boston United	3	(0)

International career^{‡}
2018–2019	England U18	3	(1)
2019	England U19	1	(1)
- * Club domestic league appearances and goals as of 21:16, 1 September 2025 (UTC) ‡ National team caps and goals as of 18:47, 5 September 2019 (UTC)

Daniel Adshead (born 2 September 2001) is an English professional footballer who plays as a midfielder for National League club Boston United.

== Club career ==
=== Rochdale ===
Born in Manchester, Adshead is a product of the Rochdale Academy. He began training with the first team at the age of 14. He attracted scouts from Manchester City, Manchester United, Chelsea, Arsenal, Liverpool, Tottenham Hotspur, Barcelona and Bayern Munich.

In 2016, he made his debut for Rochdale under-18s aged just 15. Adshead travelled with the first team during a pre-season camp to Tenerife in July 2017.

In September 2017, he became the club's youngest ever player with an appearance in the EFL Trophy aged 16 years, 17 days. Due to child protection regulations, Adshead had to change away from his teammates.

On 5 April 2019, Adshead was announced as the LFE Apprentice Of The Year for the 2018–19 League One season. He was described as "a model apprentice and a fine young man with the potential of a great future in the game".

=== Norwich City ===
On 18 June 2019, Adshead signed for newly promoted Premier League club Norwich City for £750,000.

==== Loan to Telstar ====
On 26 August 2020, Adshead joined Dutch second-tier club SC Telstar on loan for the 2020–21 season.

==== Loan to Gillingham ====
On 19 August 2021, Adshead joined League One club Gillingham on loan. Having suffered an injury that had prevented him featuring for the Kent side since November, it was confirmed on 11 February 2022 that he had returned to his parent club.

=== Cheltenham Town ===
On 21 June 2022, Adshead joined League One club Cheltenham Town for an undisclosed fee, signing a two-year contract. In January 2023, he returned to Rochdale on loan until the end of the season, knee surgery preventing him from making an appearance as the club were relegated.

In December 2023, Adshead joined National League club AFC Fylde on a short-term loan until the end of January 2024. His loan was then extended until the end of the season.

Adshead was released by Cheltenham at the end of the 2023–24 season.

=== Boston United ===
On 12 December 2024, Adshead joined National League club Boston United.

== International career ==
On 9 November 2018, Adshead was called up to the England U18 team for the first time for a tournament in Spain. He scored on his debut against the Netherlands.

On 5 September 2019, Adshead scored on his England U19s debut during a 3–1 victory over Greece at St. George's Park

== Career statistics ==
As of match played 11 January 2025

Appearances and goals by club, season and competition
Club	Season	Division	League		National cup (Note: Includes FA Cup, KNVB Cup)		League cup (Note: Includes EFL Cup)		Other		Total	
Club	Season	Division	Apps	Goals	Apps	Goals	Apps	Goals	Apps	Goals	Apps	Goals
Rochdale	2017–18	League One	1	0	3	0	0	0	5 (Note: Appearances in the EFL Trophy)	0	9	0
Rochdale	2018–19	League One	10	0	1	0	0	0	5	1	16	1
Rochdale	Total		11	0	4	0	0	0	10	1	25	1
Norwich City U21	2019–20	—			—		—		2	0	2	0
Norwich City	2019–20	Premier League	0	0	0	0	0	0	0	0	0	0
Telstar (loan)	2020–21	Eerste Divisie	28	0	1	0	—		—		29	0
Gillingham (loan)	2021–22	League One	15	0	2	0	1	0	1	0	19	0
Cheltenham Town	2022–23	League One	11	0	1	0	1	0	2	0	15	0
Cheltenham Town	2023–24	League One	4	0	1	0	1	0	3	0	9	0
Cheltenham Town	Total		15	0	2	0	2	0	5	0	24	0
Rochdale (loan)	2022–23	League Two	0	0	—		—		—		0	0
Fylde (loan)	2023–24	National League	19	0	—		—		0	0	19	0
Boston United	2024–25	National League	3	0	—		—		1 (Note: Appearance in FA Trophy)	0	4	0
Career total			91	0	9	0	3	0	19	1	122	1

== Honours ==
Individual

- EFL League One Apprentice of the Year: 2019
