= Will Goodwin =

English footballer (born 2002)

Personal information
- Full name: William Neil Goodwin
- Date of birth: 7 May 2002 (age 24)
- Place of birth: Tarporley, England
- Height: 6 ft 1 in (1.85 m)
- Position: Forward

Team information
- Current team: Gillingham
- Number: 9

Youth career
- –2020: Chester

Senior career*
Years	Team	Apps	(Gls)
2020–2021	Chester	6	(0)
2020	→ Stalybridge Celtic (loan)	2	(1)
2021–2023	Stoke City	0	(0)
2021–2022	→ Hartlepool United (loan)	10	(1)
2022–2023	→ Torquay United (loan)	24	(6)
2023–2024	Cheltenham Town	28	(6)
2024–2026	Oxford United	11	(1)
2025	→ Wigan Athletic (loan)	6	(0)
2025–2026	→ Colchester United (loan)	28	(4)
2026–	Gillingham	7	(0)
- * Club domestic league appearances and goals as of 13:08, 27 September 2026 (UTC)

William Neil Goodwin (born 7 May 2002) is an English professional footballer who plays as a forward for EFL League Two club Gillingham.

== Career ==
Goodwin began his career with Chester at the age of 9, making his first-team debut in January 2020 aged 17. He moved on loan to Stalybridge Celtic in October 2020.

He signed for Stoke City in February 2021, having previously been a child mascot for the club. He moved on loan to Hartlepool United in August 2021, making his professional debut on 14 August 2021 against Barrow and scoring in a 3–2 defeat. In July 2022, he joined National League side Torquay United on a six-month loan.

On 9 January 2023, he signed for League One side Cheltenham Town on a two-and-a-half-year deal.

On 19 January 2024, Goodwin signed a permanent deal with Oxford United, then in League One. He scored his first goal for the club in a 2–2 home draw with Northampton Town on 20 February 2024, during his third substitute appearance. On 5 January 2025, he joined Wigan Athletic on loan until the end of the 2024–25 season. On 9 July 2025 it was announced that he would join Colchester United on loan for the 2025–26 season.

On 11 May 2026 Oxford said the player would leave in the summer when his contract expired. In June 2026 it was announced that he would sign for Gillingham on 1 July 2026.

== Career statistics ==
As of match played 26 September 2026

Appearances and goals by club, season and competition
Club	Season	League			FA Cup		League Cup		Other		Total	
Club	Season	Division	Apps	Goals	Apps	Goals	Apps	Goals	Apps	Goals	Apps	Goals
Chester	2019–20	National League North	0	0	0	0	—		3 (Note: Two appearances in Cheshire Senior Cup, one appearance in FA Trophy)	0	3	0
Chester	2020–21	National League North	6	0	0	0	—		2 (Note: Appearance(s) in FA Trophy.)	1	8	1
Chester	Total		6	0	0	0	—		5	1	11	1
Stalybridge Celtic (loan)	2020–21	NPL Premier Division	2	1	0	0	—		0	0	2	1
Stoke City	2020–21	Championship	0	0	0	0	0	0	—		0	0
Stoke City	2021–22	Championship	0	0	0	0	0	0	—		0	0
Stoke City	2022–23	Championship	0	0	0	0	0	0	—		0	0
Stoke City	Total		0	0	0	0	0	0	0	0	0	0
Hartlepool United (loan)	2021–22	League Two	10	1	1	0	0	0	4 (Note: Appearance(s) in EFL Trophy.)	1	15	2
Torquay United (loan)	2022–23	National League	24	6	4	1	—		1	0	29	7
Cheltenham Town	2022–23	League One	12	0	0	0	0	0	1	1	13	1
Cheltenham Town	2023–24	League One	16	6	1	0	0	0	2	0	19	6
Cheltenham Town	Total		28	6	1	0	0	0	3	1	32	7
Oxford United	2023–24	League One	8	1	0	0	0	0	0	0	8	1
Oxford United	2024–25	Championship	3	0	0	0	0	0	0	0	3	0
Oxford United	2025–26	Championship	0	0	0	0	0	0	0	0	0	0
Oxford United	Total		11	1	0	0	0	0	0	0	11	1
Wigan Athletic (loan)	2024–25	League One	6	0	2	0	0	0	0	0	8	0
Colchester United (loan)	2025–26	League Two	28	4	0	0	0	0	2	0	30	4
Gillingham	2026–27	League Two	7	0	0	0	1	0	1	0	9	0
Career total			122	19	8	1	1	0	16	3	147	23
