= Ben Williams (footballer, born 1999) =

Welsh footballer

Personal information
- Full name: Benjamin Joseph Williams
- Date of birth: 31 March 1999 (age 27)
- Place of birth: Hesketh Bank, England
- Height: 1.78 m (5 ft 10 in)
- Position: Left-back

Team information
- Current team: Morecambe
- Number: 3

Youth career
- –2017: Blackburn Rovers
- 2015–2016: → Morecambe (loan)
- 2017–2018: Barnsley

Senior career*
Years	Team	Apps	(Gls)
2018–2022	Barnsley	36	(0)
2022–2024	Cheltenham Town	68	(3)
2024–2025	Carlisle United	8	(0)
2025–	Morecambe	23	(0)

International career^{‡}
2014	Wales U16	2	(0)
- * Club domestic league appearances and goals as of 26 October 2025 (UTC) ‡ National team caps and goals as of 12:05, 17 November 2019 (UTC)

Benjamin Joseph Williams (born 31 March 1999) is a professional footballer who plays as a left-back for Morecambe.

== Club career ==
Originating from Preston, Williams had spells with Blackburn Rovers and Morecambe before joining Barnsley in June 2017, following a successful trial period. On 4 September 2018, he made his first-team debut during their EFL Trophy victory over Oldham Athletic, featuring for the entire 90 minutes in the 2–1 win.

Williams made his first league appearance for Barnsley against Peterborough United on 6 October.

On 5 January 2022, Williams joined Cheltenham Town for an undisclosed fee. After the conclusion of the 2023/24 season, Williams was one of 9 players released by Cheltenham, following their relegation to League Two.

On 10 August 2024, Williams joined League Two side Carlisle United on a deal until January 2025. He made his debut later that day, starting in a 4–1 loss to Gillingham. On 5 January 2025, Williams left Carlisle following the expiration of his short-term contract.

On 21 August 2025, Williams signed for Morecambe.

== Career statistics ==
As of match played 30 November 2024

Appearances and goals by club, season and competition
Club	Season	League			FA Cup		League Cup		Other		Total	
Club	Season	Division	Apps	Goals	Apps	Goals	Apps	Goals	Apps	Goals	Apps	Goals
Barnsley	2017–18	Championship	0	0	0	0	0	0	—		0	0
Barnsley	2018–19	League One	11	0	1	0	0	0	3 (Note: Appearances in EFL Trophy)	0	15	0
Barnsley	2019–20	Championship	20	0	1	0	0	0	—		21	0
Barnsley	2020–21	Championship	0	0	0	0	0	0	—		0	0
Barnsley	2021–22	Championship	5	0	0	0	0	0	—		5	0
Barnsley	Total		36	0	2	0	0	0	3	0	41	0
Cheltenham Town	2021–22	League One	11	1	0	0	0	0	—		11	1
Cheltenham Town	2022–23	League One	30	1	1	0	0	0	5	0	36	1
Cheltenham Town	2023–24	League One	27	1	0	0	1	0	2	0	30	1
Cheltenham Town	Total		68	3	1	0	1	0	7	0	77	3
Carlisle United	2024–25	League Two	8	0	0	0	1	0	2	1	11	1
Career total			112	3	3	0	2	0	12	1	129	4

== Honours ==
Barnsley

- EFL League One runner-up: 2018–19
