= Max Harris (footballer) =

English footballer (born 1999)

Personal information
- Full name: Max James Harris
- Date of birth: 14 September 1999 (age 27)
- Place of birth: Gloucester, England
- Height: 6 ft 2 in (1.88 m)
- Position: Goalkeeper

Team information
- Current team: Weston-super-Mare
- Number: 1

Youth career
- Pegasus Juniors
- Hereford

Senior career*
Years	Team	Apps	(Gls)
2016–2017	Hereford	1	(0)
2017	→ Lydney Town (loan)	2	(0)
2017–2020	Oxford United	0	(0)
2018	→ Staines Town (loan)		
2018	→ A.F.C. Totton (loan)		
2020	→ Oxford City (loan)	4	(0)
2020–2025	Cheltenham Town	0	(0)
2021	→ Cinderford Town (loan)	3	(0)
2021	→ Redditch United (loan)	2	(0)
2021–2022	→ Weston-super-Mare (loan)	30	(0)
2022–2023	→ Weston-super-Mare (loan)	18	(0)
2023	→ Bath City (loan)	22	(0)
2023–2024	→ Weston-super-Mare (loan)	28	(0)
2024–2025	→ Weston-super-Mare (loan)	38	(0)
2025–	Weston-super-Mare	46	(0)
- * Club domestic league appearances and goals as of 21:17, 29 April 2026 (UTC)

Max James Harris (born 14 September 1999) is an English semi-professional footballer who plays for National League South club Weston-super-Mare.

== Career ==
=== Hereford ===
Harris was born in Gloucester, and started his career in the youth systems at Pegasus Juniors and Hereford. Whilst with Hereford, he made 3 appearances for the first team - two of these in the Herefordshire FA Challenge Cup, with a debut against Holme Lacy and his final appearance being his Southern League Division One South and West debut against Barnstaple Town He also spent time on loan at Lydney Town in 2017.

=== Oxford United ===
He joined Oxford United on a two-year scholarship in 2017. He spent time on loan at A.F.C. Totton.

He signed his first professional contract with Oxford United in July 2019.

On 3 January 2020, Harris joined National League South side Oxford City on a month-long loan. He appeared in four league matches for Oxford City.

He combined his time at Oxford United with studying at Hartpury University, and he captained the England Colleges team.

=== Cheltenham Town ===
Following a trial with the club, in September 2020 Harris signed for League Two side Cheltenham Town after his contract at Oxford United expired. He made his debut for Cheltenham Town on 6 October 2020 as a half-time substitute for Scott Flinders in a 2–0 EFL Trophy victory over Plymouth Argyle.

He signed a new contract with Cheltenham in May 2021. Ahead of the 2021–22 season he appeared in pre-season friendlies for Bishop's Cleeve and Stourbridge. During the season he spent time on loan at Cinderford Town, Redditch United and Weston-super-Mare. Harris returned to Weston-super-Mare on loan for the 2022–23 season.

He moved on loan to Bath City in January 2023, after being recalled from his loan with Weston.

In December 2023, Harris returned to Weston-super-Mare on loan until the end of the season.

Ahead of the 2024–25 season, Harris was reported to have been on trial with both Swindon Town and Bristol Rovers, neither of which resulted in a move materialising. In September 2024, he returned to Weston-super-Mare on a season-long loan deal. He was released by Cheltenham in May 2025.

=== Weston-super-Mare ===
After leaving Cheltenham, Harris returned to Weston-super-Mare permanently, in what would be his fifth spell with the club.

== Career statistics ==
As of match played 2 May 2026

Appearances and goals by club, season and competition
Club	Season	League			FA Cup		League Cup		Other		Total	
Club	Season	Division	Apps	Goals	Apps	Goals	Apps	Goals	Apps	Goals	Apps	Goals
Hereford	2016–17	SL Division One S&W	1	0	0	0	—		0	0	1	0
Hereford	2017–18	SL Premier Division	0	0	0	0	—		0	0	0	0
Hereford	Total		1	0	0	0	—		0	0	1	0
Lydney Town (loan)	2017–18	Hellenic Premier Division	2	0	—		—		0	0	2	0
Oxford United	2017–18	League One	0	0	0	0	0	0	0	0	0	0
Oxford United	2018–19	League One	0	0	0	0	0	0	0	0	0	0
Oxford United	2019–20	League One	0	0	0	0	0	0	0	0	0	0
Oxford United	Total		0	0	0	0	0	0	0	0	0	0
Oxford City (loan)	2019–20	National League South	4	0	—		—		0	0	4	0
Cheltenham Town	2020–21	League Two	0	0	0	0	0	0	1 (Note: Appearance(s) in EFL Trophy)	0	1	0
Cheltenham Town	2021–22	League One	0	0	0	0	0	0	0	0	0	0
Cheltenham Town	2022–23	League One	0	0	0	0	0	0	0	0	0	0
Cheltenham Town	2023–24	League One	0	0	0	0	0	0	3	0	3	0
Cheltenham Town	2024–25	League Two	0	0	0	0	0	0	0	0	0	0
Cheltenham Town	Total		0	0	0	0	0	0	4	0	4	0
Cinderford Town (loan)	2021–22	SL Division One South	3	0	0	0	—		—		3	0
Redditch United (loan)	2021–22	SL Premier Division Central	2	0	—		—		2 (Note: One appearance in Southern League Cup; one appearance in Birmingham Senior Cup)	0	4	0
Weston-super-Mare (loan)	2021–22	SL Premier Division South	30	0	—		—		3 (Note: Two appearances in FA Trophy; one appearance in Southern League play-offs)	0	33	0
Weston-super-Mare (loan)	2022–23	SL Premier Division South	18	0	4	0	—		2 (Note: Appearance(s) in FA Trophy)	0	24	0
Bath City (loan)	2022–23	National League South	22	0	—		—		—		22	0
Weston-super-Mare (loan)	2023–24	National League South	28	0	—		—		3 (Note: Two appearances in FA Trophy; one appearance in Somerset Premier Cup)	0	31	0
Weston-super-Mare (loan)	2024–25	National League South	38	0	5	0	—		1	0	44	0
Weston-super-Mare	2025–26	National League South	46	0	7	0	—		4 (Note: Two appearances in FA Trophy; two appearances in National League South play-offs)	0	57	0
Career total			194	0	16	0	0	0	19	0	229	0
