= Callum Ebanks =

English footballer (born 2002)

Personal information
- Date of birth: 8 October 2002 (age 24)
- Place of birth: Birmingham, England
- Position: Forward

Team information
- Current team: Halesowen Town

Youth career
- Cheltenham Town

Senior career*
Years	Team	Apps	(Gls)
2020–2023	Cheltenham Town	2	(0)
202?–201?	→ Worcester City (loan)		
202?–201?	→ Tuffley Rovers (loan)		
2021	→ Evesham United (loan)	13	(9)
2021–2022	→ Bromsgrove Sporting (loan)	16	(3)
2022	→ Eastleigh (loan)	9	(1)
2022–2023	→ Bath City (loan)	7	(1)
2023–2025	Stratford Town	82	(39)
2025–	Buxton	12	(0)
2025–	→ Bedford Town (loan)	1	(0)
- * Club domestic league appearances and goals as of 18:41, 10 December 2025 (UTC)

Callum Ebanks (born 8 October 2002) is an English professional footballer who plays as a forward for Bedford Town on loan from National League North club Buxton.

== Career ==
Ebanks started playing football at the age of twelve and earned trials with Walsall and Birmingham City after joining Oldbury-based Sunday side Legion Lions. He joined Cheltenham Town on a scholarship deal, and signed his first three-year professional contract with the club at the age of 17 in September 2020. He played on loan at Worcester City, Tuffley Rovers, Evesham United and Bromsgrove Sporting. He made his EFL League One debut for Cheltenham on 30 July 2022, in a 3–2 defeat to Peterborough United at Whaddon Road.

On 20 August 2022, he joined National League club Eastleigh on loan for the first half of the 2022–23 season. He was released by Cheltenham at the end of the 2022–23 season.

He signed for Stratford Town in summer 2023.

On 27 June 2025, Ebanks signed for National League North club Buxton, making his debut on the opening day of the season against Radcliffe. In December 2025, he joined Bedford Town on loan for the remainder of the season.

== Career statistics ==
As of match played 16 August 2025

Appearances and goals by club, season and competition
Club	Season	League			FA Cup		EFL Cup		Other		Total	
Club	Season	Division	Apps	Goals	Apps	Goals	Apps	Goals	Apps	Goals	Apps	Goals
Cheltenham Town	2019–20	League Two	0	0	0	0	0	0	0	0	0	0
Cheltenham Town	2020–21	League Two	0	0	0	0	0	0	1	0	1	0
Cheltenham Town	2021–22	League One	0	0	0	0	0	0	0	0	0	0
Cheltenham Town	2022–23	League One	2	0	0	0	1	0	0	0	3	0
Cheltenham Town	Total		2	0	0	0	1	0	1	0	4	0
Evesham United (loan)	2021–22	SL Division One South	13	9	0	0	—		1 (Note: Appearance(s) in FA Trophy)	1	14	10
Bromsgrove Sporting (loan)	2021–22	SL Premier Division Central	16	3	0	0	—		1 (Note: Appearance in Worcestershire Senior Cup)	1	17	4
Eastleigh (loan)	2022–23	National League	9	1	1	0	—		0	0	10	1
Bath City (loan)	2022–23	National League South	7	1	0	0	—		2	0	9	1
Stratford Town (loan)	2022–23	SL Premier Division Central	15	4	0	0	—		0	0	15	4
Stratford Town	2023–24	SL Premier Division Central	32	23	0	0	—		1	0	33	23
Stratford Town	2024–25	SL Premier Division Central	35	12	1	0	—		1 (Note: Appearance in Birmingham Senior Cup)	0	37	12
Stratford Town	Total		82	39	1	0	—		2	0	85	39
Buxton	2025–26	National League North	2	0	0	0	—		0	0	2	0
Career total			131	53	2	0	1	0	7	2	141	55
