= Charlie Raglan =

English footballer (born 1993)

Personal information
- Full name: Charles Jordan Clark Raglan
- Date of birth: 28 April 1993 (age 33)
- Place of birth: Wythenshawe, England
- Height: 6 ft 0 in (1.83 m)
- Position: Defender

Team information
- Current team: Radcliffe
- Number: 27

Youth career
- UD Guargacho
- Juan Migue
- CD Marino
- 2008–2011: Port Vale

Senior career*
| Years | Team | Apps | (Gls) |
| 2011–2012 | Port Vale | 0 | (0) |
| 2011 | → Hinckley United (loan) | 6 | (1) |
| 2012–2013 | Hinckley United | 24 | (0) |
| 2013 | Nantwich Town | 17 | (1) |
| 2013–2014 | FC United of Manchester | 38 | (5) |
| 2014–2017 | Chesterfield | 46 | (1) |
| 2016–2017 | → Oxford United (loan) | 16 | (0) |
| 2017–2019 | Oxford United | 1 | (0) |
| 2018 | → Port Vale (loan) | 10 | (0) |
| 2019 | → Cheltenham Town (loan) | 19 | (2) |
| 2019–2023 | Cheltenham Town | 126 | (3) |
| 2023–2025 | Oldham Athletic | 73 | (5) |
| 2025–2026 | Barrow | 34 | (1) |
| 2026– | Radcliffe | 0 | (0) |
- * Club domestic league appearances and goals as of 11:08, 5 May 2026 (UTC)

Charles Jordan Clark Raglan (born 28 April 1993) is an English professional footballer who plays as a defender for National League North club Radcliffe.

Raglan began his career at Port Vale but was allowed to join non-League Hinckley United in 2012 following a loan spell at the club. He went on to join Nantwich Town in February 2013 and then F.C. United of Manchester later in the year. He returned to the English Football League with Chesterfield in April 2014 and joined Oxford United in June 2017 following a loan spell. He returned to Port Vale on loan in January 2018 and was loaned to Cheltenham Town in January 2019 before joining the club permanently five months later. He helped Cheltenham to win promotion as champions of League Two in the 2020–21 season. Having been released by Cheltenham, he signed with Oldham Athletic in July 2023. He was promoted out of the National League play-offs with the club in 2025, before he moved on to Barrow. Barrow were relegated from the EFL and he switched to Radcliffe in August 2026.

== Career ==
=== Port Vale ===
Raglan was born in Wythenshawe, England, but grew up in Tenerife and spent his youth associated with UD Guargacho, Juan Miguel, and CD Marino. He returned to England and came through the Port Vale youth academy to sign professional forms with the club in June 2011, having just been voted Youth Player of the Year. He spent October 2011 on loan at Conference North club Hinckley United; the deal was later extended to cover the month of November. He scored for Hinckley in a 3–3 draw at Blyth Spartans. He helped the "Knitters" to the First round of the FA Cup, after playing in all five qualifying matches. He then gave away a penalty against Tamworth in a 2–2 draw at De Montfort Park, before a 90th-minute strike from Kieron St Aimie won the tie for Tamworth at The Lamb Ground. He returned to Vale Park in December, having played 14 games for Hinckley, half of which were in the FA Cup. He joined Hinckley permanently in the summer after Vale manager Micky Adams 'reluctantly' opted not to offer him a new contract at the club.

=== Non-League ===
He signed with Nantwich Town in February 2013, manager Jimmy Quinn stating that "he is ambitious and wants to fulfil his potential and realise dream of playing league football." He joined Northern Premier League Premier Division club FC United of Manchester for the 2013–14 season, helping Karl Marginson's "Red Rebels" to a second-place finish in the league; they reached the play-off semi-finals, where they were beaten by Ashton United at Gigg Lane.

=== Chesterfield ===
Raglan signed with Chesterfield in April 2014, with the manager Paul Cook describing him as "very much one for the future". He made his League One debut on 30 August, coming on for Sam Hird 29 minutes into a 2–1 victory over former club Port Vale at Vale Park. He marked another milestone against his former club, scoring his first Football League goal in a 3–0 win over Port Vale in the return fixture at the Proact Stadium on 10 January. He made a total of 25 appearances in the 2014–15 season and helped the "Spireites" to the play-offs, where they were beaten by Preston North End at the semi-final stage. He signed a new contract extension at the start of the 2015–16 season, keeping him tied to the club until summer 2017. He underwent hernia surgery in February 2016.

=== Oxford United ===
He joined Oxford United on a five-month loan deal on 31 August 2016. Manager Michael Appleton said that "we were looking for someone to cover us at centre-half with Curtis Nelson, Aaron Martin and Joe Skarz all struggling right now and he fits the bill perfectly." In January he extended his loan deal until the end of the season despite being kept out of the first-team by the form of Chey Dunkley and Curtis Nelson. He played a total of 16 games for the "U's" during the 2016–17 campaign before being released by Chesterfield in May 2017. He signed a two-year contract with Oxford the following month after stating that "I thoroughly enjoyed last season".

He ruptured two ligaments on the eve of the new season and was ruled out of action for three months. His injury left him unable to feature under manager Pep Clotet, and with the arrival of Robert Dickie, caretaker manager Derek Fazackerley felt that he had enough cover at centre-back to allow Raglan to look for game time elsewhere. On 30 January 2018, he re-joined former club Port Vale in League Two on loan until the end of the 2017–18 season; manager Neil Aspin had quickly needed a centre-back to replace the recalled loanee Tom Anderson. He made an excellent debut by helping the "Valiants" to keep a clean sheet in a 0–0 draw with Morecambe at Vale Park on 4 February. However, he was dropped after a poor performance in a 5–1 defeat to Cheltenham Town six days later, before making a good impression upon his return to the team four weeks later in place of the injured Kyle Howkins.

=== Cheltenham Town ===
On 15 January 2019, he joined League Two side Cheltenham Town on loan until the end of the 2018–19 season, having played against the "Robins" earlier in the season in the EFL Trophy. Oxford head coach Karl Robinson said that "we can't offer him that on a regular basis right now [because] we have Curtis Nelson and Rob Dickie playing regularly plus John Mousinho and Sam Long". He went on to make 19 appearances for Cheltenham, being utilised on the right of a back three alongside Ben Tozer and Will Boyle by manager Michael Duff, helping the club to a 16th-place finish. He was released by Oxford on 9 May and signed a two-year deal with Cheltenham five days later.

He had a strong 2019–20 season and was named in five out of eleven journalists 'League Two team of the season (so far)' after the COVID-19 pandemic in England caused the season to be put on hiatus on 15 March. The season was ended early with Cheltenham in the play-offs and Raglan scored the opening goal of the semi-finals, a 2–0 first leg victory at Northampton Town on 18 June. However, Cheltenham went on to lose the second leg at Whaddon Road by three goals to nil and were eliminated from the play-offs.

Raglan signed a new two-and-a-half-year contract with Town in January 2021. He featured 47 times throughout the 2020–21 campaign, mainly as a right-sided centre-half, as Cheltenham secured promotion as League Two champions. He played alongside Will Boyle and Ben Tozer at centre-back, with Matty Blair and Chris Hussey at wing-back, and praised his defensive teammates and manager Duff for the club's excellent defensive record. He missed two-and-a-half months of the 2021–22 campaign with injury, but nevertheless featured 30 times as Cheltenham finished comfortably in mid-table. He was sent off for making a late tackle on Jordan Shipley during a 1–0 defeat at Shrewsbury Town on 29 December 2022. He made thirty appearances during the 2022–23 campaign, only half of which were league starts, having found himself mainly on the bench as head coach Wade Elliott preferred defensive a line-up of Sean Long, Caleb Taylor and Lewis Freestone. He was released at the end of the season.

=== Oldham Athletic ===
On 3 July 2023, Raglan signed for National League club Oldham Athletic on a two-year deal. Manager David Unsworth said that Raglan had turned down a two-year deal with Cheltenham to return to the North-West as his partner had recently given birth to twins. Raglan was dropped from the first XI and made his return under new manager Micky Mellon, helping Melon to win his first game in charge with a 1–0 win away at Woking on 18 November. This was the start of a good run of form for Oldham, during which time he partnered Liam Hogan and Shaun Hobson in a back three. He played 32 times in the league in the 2023–24 campaign.

He was named as vice-captain by Mellon in August 2024. He scored five goals in 41 league games in the 2024–25 season to help to secure the Latics a place in the play-offs. He captained Oldham to victory over Southend United in the final at Wembley to secure the club a place back in the English Football League. He left Oldham after he chose not to trigger an option within his contract to remain at the club for an additional season.

=== Barrow ===
On 27 June 2025, Raglan signed a two-year contract with League Two club Barrow, reuniting with manager Andy Whing, who had been a teammate at Oxford. The team went six games unbeaten in November and Raglan said the side still had "a lot more to give". However, Whing was sacked after a spell of poor results and new manager Dino Maamria dropped Raglan from the first XI. Raglan featured 37 times in the 2025–26 campaign, which ended in relegation back into non-League. He left the club following a mutual agreement on 20 August 2026.

=== Radcliffe ===
On 22 August 2026, Raglan joined National League North club Radcliffe on a one-year deal. On 10 October, he scored a headed goal in a 4–1 win over Scarborough Athletic to help give new manager Grant Shenton his first win in charge.

== Career statistics ==
As of match played 2 May 2026

Appearances and goals by club, season and competition
| Club | Season | League | | | FA Cup | | League Cup | | Other | | Total | |
| Club | Season | Division | Apps | Goals | Apps | Goals | Apps | Goals | Apps | Goals | Apps | Goals |
|---|---|---|---|---|---|---|---|---|---|---|---|---|
| Port Vale | 2011–12 | League Two | 0 | 0 | 0 | 0 | 0 | 0 | 0 | 0 | 0 | 0 |
| Hinckley United | 2011–12 | Conference North | 6 | 1 | 7 | 0 | — | | 1 | 0 | 14 | 1 |
| Hinckley United | 2012–13 | Conference North | 24 | 0 | 0 | 0 | — | | 0 | 0 | 24 | 0 |
| Hinckley United | Total | | 30 | 1 | 7 | 0 | 0 | 0 | 1 | 0 | 38 | 1 |
| F.C. United of Manchester | 2013–14 | Northern Premier League; Premier Division | 38 | 5 | 0 | 0 | — | | 4 (Note: Appearances in the FA Trophy and Northern Premier League Challenge Cup) | 0 | 42 | 5 |
| Chesterfield | 2014–15 | League One | 18 | 1 | 6 | 0 | 0 | 0 | 1 (Note: Appearances in the Football League Trophy / EFL Trophy) | 0 | 25 | 1 |
| Chesterfield | 2015–16 | League One | 27 | 0 | 3 | 0 | 1 | 0 | 1 | 0 | 32 | 0 |
| Chesterfield | 2016–17 | League One | 1 | 0 | 0 | 0 | 1 | 0 | 1 | 0 | 3 | 0 |
| Chesterfield | Total | | 46 | 1 | 9 | 0 | 2 | 0 | 3 | 0 | 60 | 1 |
| Oxford United | 2016–17 | League One | 16 | 0 | 0 | 0 | — | | 0 | 0 | 16 | 0 |
| Oxford United | 2017–18 | League One | 0 | 0 | 0 | 0 | 0 | 0 | 1 | 0 | 1 | 0 |
| Oxford United | 2018–19 | League One | 1 | 0 | 0 | 0 | 0 | 0 | 4 | 0 | 5 | 0 |
| Oxford United | Total | | 17 | 0 | 0 | 0 | 0 | 0 | 5 | 0 | 22 | 0 |
| Port Vale (loan) | 2017–18 | League Two | 10 | 0 | — | | — | | — | | 10 | 0 |
| Cheltenham Town (loan) | 2018–19 | League Two | 19 | 2 | — | | — | | — | | 19 | 2 |
| Cheltenham Town | 2019–20 | League Two | 35 | 1 | 2 | 0 | 1 | 0 | 4 (Note: 2 Appearances in the EFL Trophy and 2 appearances and 1 goal in the play-offs) | 1 | 42 | 2 |
| Cheltenham Town | 2020–21 | League Two | 40 | 1 | 3 | 0 | 2 | 0 | 2 | 0 | 47 | 1 |
| Cheltenham Town | 2021–22 | League One | 28 | 1 | 1 | 0 | 1 | 0 | 0 | 0 | 30 | 1 |
| Cheltenham Town | 2022–23 | League One | 23 | 0 | 0 | 0 | 1 | 0 | 6 | 0 | 30 | 0 |
| Cheltenham Town | Total | | 145 | 5 | 6 | 0 | 5 | 0 | 12 | 1 | 168 | 6 |
| Oldham Athletic | 2023–24 | National League | 32 | 0 | 0 | 0 | — | | 2 (Note: Appearance(s) in the FA Trophy) | 0 | 34 | 0 |
| Oldham Athletic | 2024–25 | National League | 41 | 5 | 3 | 0 | — | | 5 (Note: 1 appearance in the FA Trophy, 1 appearance in the National League Cup and 3 appearances in the play-offs) | 0 | 49 | 3 |
| Oldham Athletic | Total | | 73 | 5 | 3 | 0 | 0 | 0 | 7 | 0 | 83 | 5 |
| Barrow | 2025–26 | League Two | 34 | 1 | 2 | 0 | 1 | 0 | 0 | 0 | 37 | 1 |
| Barrow | 2026–27 | National League | 0 | 0 | 0 | 0 | — | | 0 | 0 | 0 | 0 |
| Barrow | Total | | 34 | 1 | 2 | 0 | 1 | 0 | 0 | 0 | 37 | 1 |
| Radcliffe | 2026–27 | National League North | 0 | 0 | 0 | 0 | — | | 0 | 0 | 0 | 0 |
| Career total (Note: Statistics for Nantwich Town not recorded) | | | 393 | 18 | 27 | 0 | 8 | 0 | 32 | 1 | 460 | 19 |

== Honours ==
Cheltenham Town

- EFL League Two: 2020–21

Oldham Athletic

- National League play-offs: 2025
