= Dylan Barkers =

Dutch footballer (born 2000)

Personal information
- Full name: Dylan Kwesi Kobia Barkers
- Date of birth: 4 June 2000 (age 26)
- Place of birth: Rotterdam, Netherlands
- Height: 1.93 m (6 ft 4 in)
- Position: Midfielder

Team information
- Current team: Rushall Olympic

Youth career
- Solihull Moors

Senior career*
Years	Team	Apps	(Gls)
2018–2019	Solihull Moors	0	(0)
2019–2020	Guiseley	24	(0)
2020–2021	Alvechurch	9	(0)
2021–2023	Cheltenham Town	9	(0)
2022	→ Leamington (loan)	2	(0)
2022	→ Gloucester City (loan)	10	(0)
2022	→ Maidstone United (loan)	6	(0)
2023	Hereford	3	(0)
2023–2024	Stratford Town	19	(0)
2024	Stafford Rangers	9	(0)
2024–	Rushall Olympic	11	(0)
- * Club domestic league appearances and goals as of 19:33, 24 February 2025 (UTC)

Dylan Kwesi Kobia Barkers (born 4 June 2000) is a Dutch footballer who plays as a midfielder for Southern League Premier Division Central club Rushall Olympic.

== Career ==
On 2 August 2021, he signed a one-year contract with Cheltenham Town after impressing on trial.

On 14 January 2022, he joined Leamington on an initial one-month loan.

On 11 February 2022, he joined Gloucester City on a one-month loan.

On 30 September 2022, Barkers signed for National League club Maidstone United on a one-month loan deal.

He was released by Cheltenham at the end of the 2022–23 season.

On 5 August 2023, Barkers joined National League North club Hereford. He made his debut the same day, appearing as a substitute in Hereford's opening game of the season. He made his full debut in their sixth league fixture of the season, a 4–0 defeat against Tamworth, after which he was released by the club on 30 August 2023.

In October 2023, Barkers joined Southern League Premier Division Central club Stratford Town.

In August 2024, Barkers joined Northern Premier League Division One West club Stafford Rangers. In November 2024, he joined National League North side Rushall Olympic.

== Career statistics ==
As of match played 15 February 2025

Club	Season	League			FA Cup		EFL Cup		Other		Total	
Club	Season	Division	Apps	Goals	Apps	Goals	Apps	Goals	Apps	Goals	Apps	Goals
Solihull Moors	2018–19	National League	0	0	0	0	—		2	0	2	0
Guiseley	2018–19	National League North	6	0	0	0	—		0	0	6	0
Guiseley	2019–20	National League North	18	0	0	0	—		0	0	18	0
Guiseley	Total		24	0	0	0	—		0	0	24	0
Alvechurch	2020–21	Southern Premier Central	2	0	0	0	—		0	0	2	0
Alvechurch	2021–22	Southern Premier Central	7	0	0	0	—		1 (Note: Appearance(s) in Southern League Cup)	0	8	0
Alvechurch	Total		9	0	0	0	—		1	0	10	0
Cheltenham Town	2021–22	League One	5	0	2	0	1	0	2 (Note: Appearance(s) in EFL Trophy)	0	10	0
Cheltenham Town	2022–23	League One	4	0	0	0	1	0	3	0	8	0
Cheltenham Town	Total		9	0	2	0	2	0	5	0	18	0
Leamington (loan)	2021–22	National League North	2	0	0	0	—		0	0	2	0
Gloucester City (loan)	2021–22	National League North	10	0	0	0	—		0	0	10	0
Maidstone United (loan)	2022–23	National League	6	0	1	0	—		0	0	7	0
Hereford	2023–24	National League North	3	0	—		—		—		3	0
Stratford Town	2023–24	Southern Premier Central	19	0	—		—		2 (Note: One appearance in FA Trophy; one appearance in Birmingham Senior Cup)	0	21	0
Stafford Rangers	2024–25	Northern Division One West	9	0	2	0	—		3 (Note: Appearances in FA Trophy)	0	14	0
Rushall Olympic	2024–25	National League North	11	0	—		—		—		11	0
Career total			102	0	5	0	2	0	13	0	122	0
