= Christian Norton =

Welsh footballer

Personal information
- Full name: Christian Anthony Norton
- Date of birth: 21 May 2001 (age 25)
- Place of birth: London, England
- Position: Forward

Team information
- Current team: Bala Town
- Number: 22

Youth career
- 2017–2020: Southampton
- 2020–2021: Stoke City

Senior career*
Years	Team	Apps	(Gls)
2021–2022	Stoke City	6	(0)
2021–2022	→ Cheltenham Town (loan)	9	(0)
2022–2023	Cheltenham Town	23	(0)
2023–2024	Chester	19	(2)
2024–2025	Bala Town	6	(1)

International career^{‡}
2018–2019	Wales U19	11	(3)
2021–2022	Wales U21	1	(0)
- * Club domestic league appearances and goals as of 11:35, 22 July 2025 (UTC) ‡ National team caps and goals as of 19:09, 30 November 2023 (UTC)

Christian Anthony Norton (born 21 May 2001) is a professional footballer who plays as a forward. Born in England, he has represented Wales at under-19 and under-21 levels.

== Career ==
=== Stoke City ===
Norton began his career at Southampton and made his senior debut with the under-23 team on 9 October 2018 in the EFL Trophy against Cambridge United. He was released at the end of the 2019–20 season. Norton went on trial at Stoke City in October 2020 and joined their U23 squad in November 2020. Norton made his English Football League debut on 16 March 2021 in a 0–0 draw against Cardiff City. He was give his first start by Michael O'Neill on 17 April against Preston North End.

On 31 August 2021, Norton joined EFL League One side Cheltenham Town on loan until January 2022. Norton made 14 appearances for the Robins before returning to Stoke. He was released by Stoke at the end of the 2021–22 season.

=== Cheltenham Town ===
On 12 August 2022, Norton signed a one-year contract with Cheltenham Town. He was released after one season with the club.

=== Chester ===
On 9 November 2023, Norton joined Chester of the National League North.

== International career ==
He was selected for the Wales under-21 squad for the friendly match against Republic of Ireland on 25 March 2021.

== Career statistics ==
As of match played 22 July 2025

Appearances and goals by club, season and competition
Club	Season	League			National Cup		League Cup		Other		Total	
Club	Season	Division	Apps	Goals	Apps	Goals	Apps	Goals	Apps	Goals	Apps	Goals
Southampton U21	2018–19	—	—		—		—		1 (Note: Appearance(s) in EFL Trophy)	0	1	0
Southampton U21	2019–20	—	—		—		—		2	0	2	0
Southampton U21	Total		—		—		—		3	0	3	0
Stoke City	2020–21	Championship	6	0	0	0	0	0	0	0	6	0
Stoke City	2021–22	Championship	0	0	0	0	2	0	0	0	2	0
Stoke City	Total		6	0	0	0	2	0	0	0	8	0
Cheltenham Town (loan)	2021–22	EFL League One	9	0	3	0	0	0	2	0	14	0
Cheltenham Town	2022–23	EFL League One	23	0	1	0	0	0	6	0	30	0
Cheltenham Town	Total		32	0	4	0	0	0	8	0	44	0
Chester	2023–24	National League North	19	2	0	0	—		1 (Note: Appearance(s) in FA Trophy)	0	20	2
Bala Town	2024–25	Cymru Premier	6	1	0	0	1	0	0	0	7	1
Career total			63	3	4	0	3	0	12	0	82	3
