= Grant Horton =

English footballer

Personal information
- Full name: Grant Dean Horton
- Date of birth: 13 September 2001 (age 25)
- Place of birth: Colchester, England
- Height: 1.88 m (6 ft 2 in)
- Position: Defender

Team information
- Current team: Harrogate Town
- Number: 26

Youth career
- –2018: Cheltenham Town

Senior career*
Years	Team	Apps	(Gls)
2018–2024	Cheltenham Town	4	(0)
2018–2019	→ Worcester City (loan)	10	(0)
2019	→ Bromsgrove Sporting (loan)	1	(0)
2019	→ Yate Town (loan)	11	(0)
2019	→ Chippenham Town (loan)	4	(0)
2020	→ Bath City (loan)	7	(0)
2022	→ Bohemians (loan)	11	(1)
2023	→ Bohemians (loan)	20	(2)
2024–2025	Waterford	67	(1)
2026–	Harrogate Town	0	(0)
- * Club domestic league appearances and goals as of 19:06, 29 December 2025 (UTC)

Grant Dean Horton (born 13 September 2001) is an English professional footballer who plays as a defender for EFL League Two club Harrogate Town.

== Career ==
=== Cheltenham Town ===
Grant made his EFL League Two debut for Cheltenham Town on 7 December 2019, coming on as a 93rd minute substitute for Sean Long in a 3–0 away win against Mansfield Town. He signed his first professional contract with the club after graduating from the youth team in the summer of 2020. In May 2021 he signed a new two-year contract with Cheltenham after the club won promotion as League Two champions.

==== Bromsgrove Sporting (loan) ====
Horton joined newly promoted Southern League Premier Central side Bromsgrove Sporting on 16 August 2019.

He played one game for Bromsgrove Sporting, which came in the FA Cup, in a 2–1 home victory against Leicester Road on 24 August 2019. Horton came on as a half time substitute for Will Shorrock.

He returned to Cheltenham Town on 29 August 2019, following the return from injury of Tom Taylor.

==== Yate Town (loan) ====
On 13 September 2019, Horton joined Yate Town on loan.

==== Chippenham Town (loan) ====
In December 2019, he joined Chippenham Town on loan until the end of the season.

==== Bath City (loan) ====
After featuring in Cheltenham's EFL Trophy squad at the start of the 2020-21 season, Horton joined Bath City of the National League South on loan on 18 November 2020.

==== Bohemians (loans) ====
On 21 January 2022, Horton joined League of Ireland Premier Division club Bohemians on loan for their 2022 season. On 12 July 2022, Horton was recalled by Cheltenham after making 11 appearances for Bohemians, scoring 1 goal. Horton returned to Bohemians on loan for the 2023 League of Ireland season. He scored the first goal in a 2-1 victory for Bohemians against Cork City in the opening game of the season. He returned to Cheltenham Town after the completion of this loan on 30 June 2023.

=== Waterford ===
On 14 February 2024, it was announced that Horton had signed a permanent contract with newly promoted League of Ireland Premier Division club Waterford. In his first season, Horton appeared in every single league game for the club. On 21 November 2025, it was announced that Horton would be departing the club at the end of his contract.

=== Harrogate Town ===
On 29 December 2025, Horton agreed to join League Two strugglers Harrogate Town on a short-term deal until the end of the season, joining on 1 January 2026.

== Honours ==
Cheltenham Town

- EFL League Two: 2020–21
