= 2026–27 Shrewsbury Town F.C. season =

141st season in existence of Shrewsbury Town FC

Shrewsbury Town
2026–27 season
- Chairman: Roland Wycherley
- Head Coach: Gavin Cowan
- Stadium: New Meadow
Home colours	Away colours

The 2026–27 season is the 141st season in the history of Shrewsbury Town Football Club and their second consecutive season in League Two. In addition to the domestic league, the club would also participate in the FA Cup, the EFL Cup, and the 2026–27 EFL Trophy.

== Transfers and contracts ==
=== In ===
Date	Pos.	Player	From	Fee	Ref.
15 June 2026	CM	(England) Isaac Fletcher	(England) Barrow	Undisclosed	
30 June 2026	RB	(England) Byron Pendleton	(England) Birmingham City	Undisclosed	
1 July 2026 (Note: The transfer was announced on 5 June, and would become official on July 1 once Jude-Boyd's contract at Cheltenham Town had expired.)	RB	(Saint Lucia) Arkell Jude-Boyd	(England) Cheltenham Town	Free	
1 July 2026 (Note: The transfer was announced on 26 June, and would become official on July 1 once Davison's contract at Tranmere Rovers had expired.)	CF	(England) Josh Davison	(England) Tranmere Rovers	Free	
2 July 2026	CM	(England) Jack Price	(England) Brackley Town	Free	
4 July 2026	CAM	(England) Jay Turner-Cooke	(England) FC Halifax Town	Free	
18 September 2026	GK	(England) Cameron Gregory	(England) Brackley Town	Free	

=== Loaned in ===
Date	Pos.	Player	From	Date until	Ref.
13 July 2026	CF	(England) Joe Gbodé	(England) Luton Town	End of Season	
17 July 2026	GK	(England) Sam Proctor	(England) Aston Villa	End of Season	
28 August 2026	CM	(England) Michael Golding	(England) Leicester City	End of Season	
31 August 2026	RW	(Republic of Ireland) Kian McMahon-Brown	(England) Burnley	End of Season	
31 August 2026	LB	(England) Lino Sousa	(England) Aston Villa	End of Season	

=== Loaned out ===
Date	Pos.	Player	To	Loaned until	Ref.
3 August 2026	CF	(England) Jay Snook	(England) Nuneaton Town	End of Season	
5 August 2026	CB	(England) Reuben Falding	(England) Kidsgrove Athletic	End of Season	
7 August 2026	CF	(England) Callum Stewart	(England) Kidderminster Harriers	7 November 2026	
8 August 2026	CF	(Republic of Ireland) Ricardo Dinanga	(England) The Spartans	10 January 2027	
4 September 2026	RM	(England) Jeval Thompson-McKenzie	(England) Redditch United	30 January 2027	
29 September 2026	CB	(England) Tom Anderson	(England) Carlisle United	31 December 2026	
9 October 2026	CDM	Isaac England	(England) AFC Telford United	6 November 2026	
14 October 2026	RB	(England) Byron Pendleton	(England) Brackley Town	3 January 2027	

=== Released / Out of Contract ===
Date	Pos.	Player	Subsequent club	Joined date	Ref.
30 June 2026	CM	(England) Harrison Biggins	(Wales) Newport County	1 July 2026	
30 June 2026	LB	(England) Isaac Godwin	(Wales) The New Saints	6 July 2026	
30 June 2026	CM	(England) Taylor Perry	(England) Exeter City	July 17 2026	
30 June 2026	CM	(England) Nick Freeman	(England) Gillingham	28 July 2026	
30 June 2026	CM	(England) Simba Nyamwanza	(Wales) Caernarfon Town	August 2026	
30 June 2026	CAM	(England) Jack Loughran	(England) Prescot Cables	August 3 2026	
30 June 2026	CM	(England) Sam Clucas	(England) Bradford City	August 27 2026	
30 June 2026	CF	(England) John Marquis	(England) Woking	September 1 2026	
30 June 2026	LB	(England) Mal Benning	(England) AFC Telford United	4 September 2026	
30 June 2026	LW	(Republic of Ireland) Anthony Scully	(England) Exeter City	3 October 2026	
30 June 2026	GK	(England) JJ Male			
30 June 2026	CB	(England) Karsten Cairns			
30 June 2026	CB	(England) William Hardeman			
30 June 2026	CB	(England) Joe Morris			
30 June 2026	CM	(England) Leon Hughes			
30 June 2026	CM	(England) Arnold Manseya			
30 June 2026	CM	(Wales) Jayden Valentine			
30 June 2026	CAM	(England) Haydn Lewis			
30 June 2026	CM	(England) Alex Gilliead			

=== New Contract ===
Date	Pos.	Player	Contract Expiry	Ref.
9 May 2026	CF	(England) George Lloyd	30 June 2027	
29 May 2026	LB	(England) Josh Ruffels	Undisclosed	
8 June 2026	RB	(Wales) Luca Hoole	30 June 2028	
28 July 2026	CM	(England) Will Gray	30 June 2029	
6 November 2026	CB	(England) Ollie Hall	30 June 2029 (Note: First professional contract)	

== Pre-season and friendlies ==
On 27 April, The Shrews announced a pre-season tour to the Isle of Man for a friendly tournament alongside FC Isle of Man and Radcliffe. On 4 June, a third fixture was confirmed against Hereford. Twenty days later, a home friendly against Everton U21 was added. On 26 June, a home friendly against West Bromwich Albion was confirmed. Four days later, the pre-season opener against Stafford Rangers was announced. On 24 July, a friendly against Aston Villa was also added.

Win Draw Loss

14 July 2026 Friendly	Stafford Rangers	0–0	Shrewsbury Town	Stafford
19:15 BST		Report		Stadium: Marston Road
Note: Fixture was initially scheduled for a 19:45 kick-off, but was later brought forward half an hour.

17 July 2026 Friendly	Radcliffe	0–0 (4–2 p)	Shrewsbury Town	Ramsey, Isle of Man
15:00 BST		Report		Stadium: Ballacloan Stadium

19 July 2026 Friendly	FC Isle of Man	0–4	Shrewsbury Town	Ramsey, Isle of Man
11:00 BST		Report	Gbodé 61', 76'; Gray 64', 85'	Stadium: Ballacloan Stadium

21 July 2026 Friendly	Shrewsbury Town	1–0	Everton U21	Shrewsbury
19:30 BST	Ruffels 58'	Report		Stadium: Croud Meadow

25 July 2026 Friendly	Shrewsbury Town	1-4	West Bromwich Albion	Shrewsbury
15:00 BST	Isaac Fletcher 35'		Harry Whitwell 17'; Jimmy Jay Morgan 26', 45'; Aune Heggebø 78'	Stadium: Croud Meadow

28 July 2026 Friendly	Hereford	1–1	Shrewsbury Town	Hereford
19:45 BST	Phillips 4'	Report	Lloyd 66'	Stadium: MandM Edgar Street Stadium

1 August 2026 Friendly	Shrewsbury Town	3–2	Aston Villa XI	Shrewsbury
15:00 BST	Davison 8', 15'; Fletcher 87'	Report	Boyle 20' (o.g.); Broggio 54'	Stadium: Croud Meadow

== Competitions ==
=== League Two ===
==== League table ====
Pos	Team	Pld	W	D	L	GF	GA	GD	Pts
11	Gillingham	16	5	6	5	23	24	−1	21
12	Cheltenham Town	16	6	3	7	23	29	−6	21
13	Shrewsbury Town	16	6	3	7	20	27	−7	21
14	Accrington Stanley	16	4	8	4	26	22	+4	20
15	Fleetwood Town	16	5	5	6	20	20	0	20

Updated to match(es) played on 21 November 2026. Source: EFL Official Website
Rules for classification: 1) Points; 2) Goal difference; 3) Number of goals scored; 4) Head-to-head results; 5) Wins; 6) Away goals; 7) Penalty points (sec 9.5); 8) 12-point sending off offences

==== Results summary ====
Overall								Home						Away					
Pld	W	D	L	GF	GA	GD	Pts	W	D	L	GF	GA	GD	W	D	L	GF	GA	GD
16	6	3	7	20	27	−7	21	4	1	3	10	9	+1	2	2	4	10	18	−8

Last updated: 14 November 2026.
Source: Soccerway

==== Results by round ====
Round	1	2	3	4	5	6	7	8	9	10	11	12	13	14	15	16	17	18	19	20	21	22	23	24	25
Ground	A	H	H	A	A	H	A	H	A	H	H	A	A	H	H	A	H	A	H	A	H	A	A	H	A
Result	L	L	W	L	L	W	D	D	W	L	W	W	D	L	W	L									
Position	22	24	18	22	23	18	18	18	14	18	14	8	10	15	10	13									
Points	0	0	3	3	3	6	7	8	11	11	14	17	18	18	21	21									

Source: EFL
A = Away; H = Home; W = Win; D = Draw; L = Loss; P = Postponed

==== Matches ====
On 25 June, the League Two fixtures were revealed.

Win Draw Loss Fixtures

15 August 2026 1	Tranmere Rovers	2–0	Shrewsbury Town	Birkenhead
15:00 BST	Davies 35'; Whitaker 63', (yellow card) 87'; Senior (yellow card) 76'; Okoro (yellow card) 90+1'	Report	Davison (yellow card) 80'; England (yellow card) 87'	Stadium: Prenton Park; Attendance: 7,826; Referee: Jamie O'Connor

22 August 2026 2	Shrewsbury Town	1–3	Barnet	Shrewsbury
15:00 BST	Davison 41'; Turner-Cooke (yellow card) 68'	Report	Reeves 13'; Lakin 83'; Knowles 90'	Stadium: Croud Meadow; Attendance: 5,129; Referee: William Davis

29 August 2026 3	Shrewsbury Town	1–0	Salford City	Shrewsbury
15:00 BST	Boyle 74'; Anderson (yellow card) 86'	Report		Stadium: Croud Meadow; Attendance: 4,638 (284 away); Referee: Alan Dale

1 September 2026 4	Rochdale	3–0	Shrewsbury Town	Spotland
19:45 BST	Adeeko 33'; Hannant 43'; Adebayo-Rowling (yellow card) 74'; Smith 80'	Report	Anderson (yellow card) 27'; Boyle (yellow card) 50'; Gbodé (yellow card) 69'; Gray (yellow card) 83'	Stadium: Crown Oil Arena; Attendance: 3,241; Referee: Simon Mather

5 September 2026 5	Fleetwood Town	2–0	Shrewsbury Town	Fleetwood
12:30 BST	Coughlan 39'; McCann (yellow card) 55'; Neal (yellow card) 63'; Loupalo-Bi 86'; Evans (yellow card) 90'	Report	Hoole (yellow card) 25'; Stubbs (yellow card) 32'; Berkoe (yellow card) 48'; Davison (yellow card) 66'; Gbodé (yellow card) 90'	Stadium: Highbury Stadium; Attendance: 2,698 (267 away); Referee: Edward Duckworth
Note: Fixture was initially scheduled for a 15:00 kick-off, but was brought forward for live Sky Sports.

12 September 2026 6	Shrewsbury Town	2–0	Northampton Town	Shrewsbury
15:00 BST	McMahon-Brown 8', (yellow card) 57'; Berkoe 45'		Chambers (yellow card) 81'	Stadium: Croud Meadow; Referee: Emily Heaslip

19 September 2026 7	Crewe Alexandra	1–1	Shrewsbury Town	Crewe
15:00 BST	White (yellow card) 5'; Gibson 24'; Offord (yellow card) 54'	Report	Lee (yellow card) 22'; Sang (yellow card) 29'; Gray (yellow card) 37'; Lloyd 39'; Boyle (yellow card) 64'	Stadium: Mornflake Stadium; Attendance: 6,493 (1,312 away); Referee: Alex Chilowicz

26 September 2026 8	Shrewsbury Town	2–2	Colchester United	Shrewsbury
15:00 BST	Hoole (yellow card) 10', (goal) 29'; Turner-Cooke (yellow card) 89'; Fletcher 90+2'	Report	Sesay 19', 90+5'	Stadium: Croud Meadow; Attendance: 4,931; Referee: Jamie Robinson

3 October 2026 9	Grimsby Town	1–2	Shrewsbury Town	Cleethorpes
15:00 BST	Doyle (yellow card) 58'; Cartwright 75'	Report	Lloyd 19', (yellow card) 75'; Berkoe (yellow card) 26'; Fletcher (yellow card) 50'; McMahon-Brown (yellow card) 56', (goal) 60'; Ruffels (yellow card) 74'; Davison (yellow card) 90+4'	Stadium: Blundell Park; Attendance: 7,429 (249 away); Referee: Matt Corlett

10 October 2026 10	Shrewsbury Town	0–1	Exeter City	Shrewsbury
15:00 BST	Sang (yellow card) 11'; Hoole (yellow card) 65'; Gray (yellow card) 76'; Turner-Cooke (yellow card) 90'		Doyle-Hayes (yellow card) 43'; Perry (yellow card) 77'; Cox 86'	Stadium: Croud Meadow; Attendance: 5,095; Referee: Declan Brown

17 October 2026 11	Shrewsbury Town	1–0	Bristol Rovers	Shrewsbury
15:00 BST	Ruffels (yellow card) 16'; Lloyd (yellow card) 43', (goal) 77' (pen.); Turner-Cooke (red card) 80'; Fletcher (red card) 90+4'	Report	Forde (yellow card) 10'; Gough (yellow card) 64'; Purrington (yellow card) 88'	Stadium: Croud Meadow; Attendance: 5,329 (inc. 891 from Bristol Rovers); Referee: Ben Toner
Note: Fixture was initially scheduled for a 15:00 kick-off, but was brought forward for live Sky Sports broadcasting.

20 October 2026 12	Crawley Town	2–3	Shrewsbury Town	Crawley
19:45 BST	Adeyemo 4'; Russell (yellow card) 37'; Morgan (yellow card) 84', (goal) 85'	Report	Hoole (yellow card) 3'; Davison (yellow card) 43', (goal) 62', 90+4'; Lloyd 82', (yellow card) 90+5'	Stadium: Broadfield Stadium; Referee: Isaac Searle

24 October 2026 13	Rotherham United	3–3	Shrewsbury Town	Rotherham
15:00 BST	Mullin 16', 18'; Spence (red card) 21'; Bradshaw 76'; Hall (yellow card) 90+4'	Report	Davison 24'; Ruffels 59'; Boyle 67'; McMahon-Brown (red card) 83'	Stadium: AESSEAL New York Stadium; Attendance: 7,562; Referee: James Oldham

31 October 2026 14	Shrewsbury Town	1–2	Gillingham	Shrewsbury
15:00 GMT	Boyle (yellow card) 52'; Lloyd 59' (pen.); Hoole (yellow card) 82'	Report	Waldock 3'; Coleman (yellow card) 22'; Coleman (yellow card) 57'; Smith 80'; Little (yellow card) 87'	Stadium: Croud Meadow; Attendance: 5,255; Referee: Neil Hair

14 November 2026 15	Shrewsbury Town	2–1	Oldham Athletic	Shrewsbury
15:00 GMT	Berkoe 73'; Davison 77'; Brook (yellow card) 90+3'	Report	Daniels (yellow card) 82'; Fawunmi 90+3'; Appiah-Forson (yellow card) 90+3'	Stadium: Croud Meadow; Attendance: 7,004 (1,063 away); Referee: Ross Martin

21 November 2026 16	Chesterfield	4–1	Shrewsbury Town	Whittington Moor
15:00 GMT	Duffy 11', (yellow card) 35', (goal) 37'; Randall 18'; Stirk (yellow card) 53'; Markanday 66'; Simpson (yellow card) 88'	Report	McMahon-Brown 33'; Sang (yellow card) 45+3'; Golding (yellow card) 90'	Stadium: SMH Group Stadium; Attendance: 8,022; Referee: George Laflin

28 November 2026 17	Shrewsbury Town	v	Cheltenham Town	Shrewsbury
15:00 GMT				Stadium: Croud Meadow

1 December 2026 18	York City	v	Shrewsbury Town	Huntington
19:45 GMT				Stadium: LNER Community Stadium

12 December 2026 19	Shrewsbury Town	v	Port Vale	Shrewsbury
15:00 GMT				Stadium: Croud Meadow

19 December 2026 20	Walsall	v	Shrewsbury Town	Bescot
15:00 GMT				Stadium: Pallet-Track Bescot Stadium

26 December 2026 21	Shrewsbury Town	v	Swindon Town	Shrewsbury
15:00 GMT				Stadium: Croud Meadow

29 December 2026 22	Newport County	v	Shrewsbury Town	Newport
19:45 GMT				Stadium: Rodney Parade

1 January 2027 23	Accrington Stanley	v	Shrewsbury Town	Accrington
15:00 GMT				Stadium: Wham Stadium

9 January 2027 24	Shrewsbury Town	v	Walsall	Shrewsbury
12:30 GMT				Stadium: Croud Meadow
Note: Fixture was initially scheduled for a 15:00 kick-off, but was brought forward for live Sky Sports broadcasting.

16 January 2027 25	Bristol Rovers	v	Shrewsbury Town	Horfield
12:30 GMT				Stadium: Memorial Stadium
Note: Fixture was initially scheduled for a 15:00 kick-off, but was brought forward for live Sky Sports broadcasting.

=== FA Cup ===
Shrewsbury were drawn away to Eastleigh in the first round and home to Burton Albion in the second round.

Win Draw Loss Fixtures

7 November 2026 First round	Eastleigh	1–2	Shrewsbury Town	Eastleigh
15:00 GMT	Randall 79'	Report	Lloyd 38' (pen.); Turner-Cooke (yellow card) 45+1'; Boyle (yellow card) 72'; Fletcher 87'	Stadium: Silverlake Stadium; Attendance: 1,770 (446 away); Referee: Craig Hicks

5 December 2026 Second round	Shrewsbury Town	v	Burton Albion	Shrewsbury
15:00 GMT				Stadium: Croud Meadow

=== EFL Cup ===
Shrewsbury were drawn away to Salford City in the first round and to Fleetwood Town in the second round.

Win Draw Loss Fixtures

8 August 2026 First round	Salford City	1–1 (3–4 p)	Shrewsbury Town	Kersal
15:00 BST	Butcher (yellow card) 13'; Oluwo (yellow card) 68'; Malcolm 77'; Aimson (red card) 90+7'	Report	Davison 47'; Stubbs (yellow card) 60' (yellow-red card) 74'; Jude-Boyd (yellow card) 90+1'; Lloyd (yellow card) 90+7'	Stadium: Moor Lane; Attendance: 1,439 (497 away); Referee: Oliver Mackey
	Penalties
	Langstaff (penalty missed); Grant (penalty scored); Powell (penalty scored); Udoh (penalty missed); Graydon (penalty missed); Odoh (penalty missed); Oluwo (penalty scored); Turton (penalty scored)		Sang (penalty missed); Gbodé (penalty scored); Turner-Cooke (penalty scored); Price (penalty missed); Ruffels (penalty missed); Hoole (penalty missed); Boyle (penalty scored); Jude-Boyd (penalty scored)

25 August 2026 Second round	Fleetwood Town	4–0	Shrewsbury Town	Fleetwood
19:45 BST	Boyle 8' (o.g.); Evans 28', 35'; Rooney (yellow card) 48'; Davies 90'	Report	Jude-Boyd (yellow card) 37'; Gbodé (yellow card) 54'; Berkoe (yellow card) 74'	Stadium: Highbury Stadium; Attendance: 1,066 (179 away); Referee: Thomas Parsons

=== EFL Trophy ===
==== Group stage ====
Shrewsbury were drawn against Tranmere Rovers, Stockport County and Everton U21 into Northern Group E.

Pos	Div	Team	Pld	W	PW	PL	L	GF	GA	GD	Pts	Qualification
1	L1	Stockport County (A)	3	2	1	0	0	8	3	+5	8	Advance to Round 2
2	L2	Tranmere Rovers (A)	2	1	0	1	0	1	0	+1	4	Advance to Round 2
3	L2	Shrewsbury Town (E)	3	1	0	0	2	2	4	−2	3	
4	ACA	Everton U21 (E)	2	0	0	0	2	4	8	−4	0	

Updated to match(es) played on 10 November 2026. Source: EFL
(A) Advances to a further round; (E) Eliminated

Win Draw Loss Fixtures

22 September 2026 Group stage	Tranmere Rovers	1–0	Shrewsbury Town	Birkenhead
19:00 BST	Scott (yellow card) 50'; Jones 69'	Report	Anderson (yellow card) 42'; Jude-Boyd (yellow card) 65'; Gray (yellow card) 90+2'	Stadium: Prenton Park; Attendance: 1,339 (74 away); Referee: Paul Marsden

6 October 2026 Group stage	Shrewsbury Town	0–2	Stockport County	Shrewsbury
19:00 BST	Gray (yellow card) 90+5'		Adigun 75'; Gardner 85'	Stadium: Croud Meadow; Attendance: 1,918; Referee: Richie Watkins

27 October 2026 Group stage	Shrewsbury Town	2–1	Everton U21	Shrewsbury
19:00 GMT	Golding 51'; Thompson-McKenzie 90+2'	Report	Matos (yellow card) 15'; Benjamin 84'; Bates (yellow card) 90+4'	Stadium: Croud Meadow; Attendance: 1,563 (74 away); Referee: Rob Massey-Ellis

== Statistics ==
=== Appearances and goals ===
As of match played 21 November 2026

Players with no appearances are not included on the list; italics indicate a loaned in player

No.	Pos	Nat	Player	Total		League Two		FA Cup		EFL Cup		EFL Trophy	
No.	Pos	Nat	Player	Apps	Goals	Apps	Goals	Apps	Goals	Apps	Goals	Apps	Goals
1	GK	(England) ENG	Will Brook	19	0	16+0	0	1+0	0	2+0	0	0+0	0
2	DF	(Wales) WAL	Luca Hoole	19	1	15+0	1	1+0	0	1+1	0	0+1	0
3	DF	(England) ENG	Josh Ruffels	16	1	13+0	1	1+0	0	2+0	0	0+0	0
4	MF	(England) ENG	Isaac England	4	0	0+1	0	0+0	0	1+0	0	2+0	0
5	DF	(England) ENG	Will Boyle	19	2	16+0	2	1+0	0	2+0	0	0+0	0
6	DF	(England) ENG	Sam Stubbs	17	0	12+1	0	1+0	0	1+0	0	2+0	0
7	MF	(England) ENG	Jay Turner-Cooke	16	0	9+3	0	1+0	0	1+1	0	1+0	0
8	MF	(England) ENG	Isaac Fletcher	18	2	8+4	1	0+1	1	2+0	0	1+2	0
9	FW	(England) ENG	George Lloyd	20	6	13+3	5	1+0	1	1+1	0	1+0	0
10	DF	(England) ENG	Tom Sang	20	0	16+0	0	1+0	0	1+1	0	1+0	0
11	DF	(England) ENG	Kevin Berkoe	19	2	16+0	2	1+0	0	2+0	0	0+0	0
12	GK	(England) ENG	Sam Proctor	1	0	0+0	0	0+0	0	0+0	0	1+0	0
13	FW	(England) ENG	Josh Davison	19	6	13+2	5	1+0	0	2+0	1	1+0	0
17	DF	(Saint Lucia) LCA	Arkell Jude-Boyd	13	0	4+5	0	0+0	0	2+0	0	2+0	0
18	FW	(Republic of Ireland) IRL	Kian McMahon-Brown	12	3	10+1	3	1+0	0	0+0	0	0+0	0
19	MF	(England) ENG	Jack Price	1	0	0+0	0	0+0	0	0+1	0	0+0	0
20	MF	(England) ENG	Michael Golding	10	1	1+7	0	0+0	0	0+0	0	2+0	1
21	MF	(England) ENG	Will Gray	19	0	9+7	0	0+0	0	1+0	0	1+1	0
22	DF	(England) ENG	Byron Pendleton	3	0	0+0	0	0+0	0	0+1	0	1+1	0
23	DF	(South Korea) KOR	Isaac Lee	5	0	1+1	0	0+0	0	0+0	0	3+0	0
24	DF	(England) ENG	Lino Sousa	6	0	0+3	0	0+0	0	0+0	0	3+0	0
26	DF	(England) ENG	Tom Anderson	5	0	3+0	0	0+0	0	0+1	0	1+0	0
27	FW	(England) ENG	Joe Gbodé	13	0	1+8	0	0+0	0	1+1	0	2+0	0
28	FW	(England) ENG	Jay Snook	1	0	0+0	0	0+0	0	0+0	0	1+0	0
29	DF	(England) ENG	Reuben Falding	1	0	0+0	0	0+0	0	0+0	0	0+1	0
30	MF	(England) ENG	Jeval Thompson-McKenzie	3	1	0+1	0	0+0	0	0+0	0	0+2	1
32	GK	(England) ENG	Cameron Gregory	3	0	0+0	0	0+0	0	0+0	0	3+0	0
33	DF	(England) ENG	Ollie Hall	2	0	0+0	0	0+0	0	0+0	0	2+0	0
35	FW	(England) ENG	Harry Fallon	1	0	0+0	0	0+0	0	0+0	0	0+1	0
36	MF	(England) ENG	Jayden Rattray	1	0	0+0	0	0+0	0	0+0	0	0+1	0
46	FW	(England) ENG	Hugo Aiston	4	0	0+1	0	0+0	0	0+0	0	2+1	0
