= 2025–26 Shrewsbury Town F.C. season =

140th season in existence of Shrewsbury Town FC

Shrewsbury Town
2025–26 season
- Chairman: Roland Wycherley
- Head Coach: Michael Appleton (until 28 January); Gavin Cowan (from 29 January)
- Stadium: New Meadow
- Highest home attendance: 7,879(vs Walsall)
- Lowest home attendance: 4,116(vs Barrow)

The 2025–26 season is the 140th season in the history of Shrewsbury Town Football Club and their first season back in League Two since the 2014–15 season following their relegation from League One in the preceding season. In addition to the domestic league, the club would also participate in the FA Cup, the EFL Cup, and the 2025–26 EFL Trophy.

== Managerial changes ==
On 28 January, Michael Appleton was sacked as the club's head coach after forty three matches in charge and a win ratio of 20.93%. A day later, Gavin Cowan was appointed as the new head coach after a compensation agreement was made with Brackley Town.

== Transfers and contracts ==
=== In ===
Date	Pos.	Player	From	Fee	Ref.
1 July 2025 (Note: The transfer was announced on 16 May, and would become official on 1 July once his contract at Doncaster had ended)	CB	(England) Tom Anderson	(England) Doncaster Rovers	Free	
1 July 2025 (Note: The transfer was announced on 29 May, and would become official on 1 July once his contract at Lincoln had ended)	CM	(England) Sam Clucas	(England) Lincoln City	Free	
25 June 2025	CB	(England) Sam Stubbs	(England) Bradford City	Free	
26 June 2025	CB	(England) Will Boyle	(Wales) Wrexham	Undisclosed	
27 June 2025	CM	(England) Tom Sang	(England) Port Vale	Free	
24 July 2025	LW	(Republic of Ireland) Anthony Scully	(England) Portsmouth	Free	
29 August 2025	GK	(England) Will Brook	(England) Leamington	Free	
8 September 2025	CF	(England) Chuks Aneke	(England) Charlton Athletic	Free	
17 October 2025	LB	(England) Josh Ruffels	(England) Huddersfield Town	Free	
13 January 2026	CM	(England) Nick Freeman	(England) Stevenage	Free	
22 January 2026	CB	(South Korea) Isaac Lee	(Wales) Flint Town United	Undisclosed	
2 February 2026	LB	(England) Kevin Berkoe	(England) Salford City	Undisclosed	

=== Loaned in ===
Date	Pos.	Player	From	Date until	Ref.
22 July 2025	GK	(England) Elyh Harrison	(England) Manchester United	15 January 2026 (Note: On 15 January, Harrison's initial season-long loan from Manchester United was terminated)	
11 August 2025	CAM	(England) Tommy McDermott	(England) Burnley	31 May 2026	
29 August 2025	RW	(Netherlands) Ismeal Kabia	(England) Arsenal	31 May 2026	
31 August 2025	CF	(England) Bradley Ihionvien	(England) Peterborough United	31 May 2026	
1 January 2026	CF	(Wales) Iwan Morgan	(England) Brentford	31 May 2026	
9 January 2026	CF	(Belgium) Trey Samuel-Ogunsuyi	(England) Sunderland	31 May 2026	
15 January 2026	GK	(England) Matthew Cox	(England) Brentford	31 May 2026	
23 January 2026	CB	(Italy) Temple Ojinnaka	(England) Wolverhampton Wanderers	31 May 2026	

=== Loaned out ===
Date	Pos.	Player	To	Date until	Ref.
1 August 2025	CB	(England) Joe Morris	(England) Stourbridge	7 September 2025	
1 August 2025	FW	(England) Jay Snook	(England) Kidsgrove Athletic	17 October 2025	
1 August 2025	CB	(England) Reuben Falding	(England) Newcastle Town	October 2025	
1 August 2025	CAM	(England) Jack Loughran	(England) Shifnal Town	November 2025	
1 August 2025	CM	(England) Shayne Byrne	(England) Romulus		
1 August 2025	CB	(England) Karsten Cairns	(England) Darlaston Town (1874)		
19 August 2025	CF	(Republic of Ireland) Ricardo Dinanga	(England) AFC Telford United	31 May 2026	
1 September 2025	CM	(England) Alex Gilliead	(England) Carlisle United	31 May 2026 (Note: On 8 January, Gilliead's loan at Carlisle United was extended until the end of the season)	
9 September 2025	CB	(England) Joe Morris	(England) Kidsgrove Athletic	October 2025	
14 October 2025	CF	(England) Callum Stewart	(England) Brackley Town	5 January 2026	
16 October 2025	LB	(England) George Nurse	(England) Yeovil Town	15 November 2025	
October 2025	CB	(England) Reuben Falding	(England) Kidsgrove Athletic	Work Experience	
25 November 2025	CAM	(England) Jack Loughran	(England) Redditch United	Work Experience	
5 December 2025	LB	(England) George Nurse	(England) Solihull Moors	3 January 2026	
19 December 2025	CF	(England) Haydn Lewis	(England) Kidsgrove Athletic	Work Experience	
3 January 2026	CM	(England) Harrison Biggins	(Wales) Newport County	31 May 2026	
5 March 2026	CF	(England) Callum Stewart	(England) Aldershot Town	31 May 2026	

=== Released / Out of Contract ===
Date	Pos.	Player	Subsequent club	Join date	Ref.
30 June 2025	RM	(England) David Wheeler	Retired		
30 June 2025	CB	(England) Morgan Feeney	(England) Carlisle United	1 July 2025	
30 June 2025	DM	(England) Dominic Gape	(England) Colchester United	1 July 2025	
30 June 2025	LM	(Republic of Ireland) Jordan Shipley	(England) Port Vale	1 July 2025	
30 June 2025	DM	(England) Jordan Rossiter	(Republic of Ireland) Waterford	14 July 2025	
30 June 2025	CB	(Grenada) Aaron Pierre	(England) Eastleigh	17 July 2025	
30 June 2025	CF	(England) Luca Whitney	(England) Newcastle Town	1 August 2025	
30 June 2025	GK	(England) Joe Young	(England) Buxton	3 August 2025	
30 June 2025	GK	(England) Jamal Blackman	(England) Morecambe	9 October 2025	
1 September 2025	GK	(England) Toby Savin	(England) Wigan Athletic	1 September 2025	
1 September 2025	CF	(New Zealand) Max Mata	(Republic of Ireland) St Patrick's Athletic	1 December 2025	
15 October 2025	CB	(Democratic Republic of the Congo) Aristote Nsiala	(England) Bury	23 January 2026	
8 January 2026	LB	(England) George Nurse	(England) Cheltenham Town	8 January 2026	
19 January 2026	CF	(England) Chuks Aneke			

=== New Contract ===
Date	Pos.	Player	Contract Expiry	Ref.
4 August 2025	CM	Isaac England	30 June 2028 (Note: First professional contract)	
28 November 2025	GK	(England) Will Brook	30 June 2028	
14 January 2026	LB	(England) Josh Ruffels	30 June 2026	

== Pre-season and friendlies ==
On 20 May, Shrewsbury Town announced their first pre-season friendly, against Bolton Wanderers. In June, a further five friendlies were confirmed against Leamington, AFC Telford United, Stoke City, Burnley and Kidderminster Harriers.

Win Draw Loss

9 July 2025 Friendly	Stoke City	0–1	Shrewsbury Town	Newcastle-under-Lyme
13:00 BST		Report	Stewart	Stadium: Clayton Wood; Attendance: 0 (Behind-closed-doors)

12 July 2025 Friendly	Leamington	0–2	Shrewsbury Town	Leamington Spa
15:00 BST		Report	England 32'; Lloyd 83'	Stadium: New Windmill Ground

15 July 2025 Friendly	AFC Telford United	1–2	Shrewsbury Town	Wellington
19:30 BST				Stadium: New Bucks Head

19 July 2025 Friendly	Shrewsbury Town	3–0	Kidderminster Harriers	Shrewsbury
15:00 BST				Stadium: New Meadow

22 July 2025 Friendly	Shrewsbury Town	2–5	Bolton Wanderers	Shrewsbury
19:00 BST				Stadium: New Meadow

26 July 2025 Friendly	Shrewsbury Town	2–2	Burnley	Shrewsbury
15:00 BST				Stadium: New Meadow

== Competitions ==
=== League Two ===
==== League table ====
Pos	Team	Pld	W	D	L	GF	GA	GD	Pts
17	Gillingham	46	13	14	19	53	72	−19	53
18	Cheltenham Town	46	14	10	22	53	79	−26	52
19	Shrewsbury Town	46	13	10	23	42	69	−27	49
20	Newport County	46	12	7	27	48	77	−29	43
21	Tranmere Rovers	46	10	11	25	54	79	−25	41

Source: EFL Official Website
Rules for classification: 1) Points; 2) Goal difference; 3) Number of goals scored; 4) Head-to-head results; 5) Wins; 6) Away goals; 7) Penalty points (sec 9.5); 8) 12-point sending off offences

==== Results summary ====
Overall								Home						Away					
Pld	W	D	L	GF	GA	GD	Pts	W	D	L	GF	GA	GD	W	D	L	GF	GA	GD
46	13	10	23	42	69	−27	49	9	6	8	21	27	−6	4	4	15	21	42	−21

Last updated: 28 March 2026.
Source: Soccerway

==== Results by round ====
Round	1	2	3	4	5	6	7	8	9	10	11	12	13	14	15	16	17	18	19	20	21	22	23	24	27	28	29	30	31	26^{1}	32	33	34	25^{1}	35	36	37	38	39	40	41	42	43	44	45	46
Ground	H	A	H	A	A	H	A	H	A	H	A	H	H	A	A	H	A	H	H	A	H	A	A	H	H	A	A	H	A	H	H	H	A	A	H	A	H	A	H	A	H	A	H	A	H	A
Result	D	L	L	L	L	D	W	L	L	L	D	W	W	D	L	W	L	D	D	D	L	L	L	L	W	L	L	D	L	W	W	W	W	W	L	W	L	L	L	L	W	L	W	D	D	L
Position	14	19	20	23	23	23	21	23	23	23	23	22	21	21	23	21	22	20	20	20	20	21	21	22	20	21	21	21	22	21	19	19	18	17	17	17	18	18	19	19	18	18	18	19	19	19
Points	1	1	1	1	1	2	5	5	5	5	6	9	12	13	13	16	16	17	18	19	19	19	19	19	22	22	22	23	23	26	29	32	35	38	38	41	41	41	41	41	44	44	47	48	49	49

Source: EFL
A = Away; H = Home; W = Win; D = Draw; L = Loss; P = Postponed
Notes:
- ^{1} Matchday 25 (vs. Salford City) was postponed due to a frozen pitch.
- ^{2} Matchday 26 (vs. Barrow) was rearranged due to FA Cup progression.

==== Matches ====
On 26 June, the League Two fixtures were announced.

Win Draw Loss Fixtures

2 August 2025 1	Shrewsbury Town	0–0	Bromley	Shrewsbury
15:00 BST				Stadium: New Meadow

9 August 2025 2	Tranmere Rovers	4–0	Shrewsbury Town	Birkenhead
12:30 BST	Harris 19'; Davison 22'; Patrick 74'; Brough (yellow card) 85'; Dennis 88'	Report	Boyle (yellow card) 57' (yellow-red card) 58'; Perry (yellow card) 84'	Stadium: Prenton Park; Attendance: 7,626 (1,128 away); Referee: Jamie O'Connor
Note: Fixture was originally scheduled for a 15:00 kick-off, but was moved live Sky Sports broadcasting.

16 August 2025 3	Shrewsbury Town	0–2	Colchester United	Shrewsbury
15:00 BST	Boyle (yellow card) 22'; McDermott (red card) 65'; Perry (yellow card) 79'	Report	Tovide 57'; Payne (yellow card) 70'; Lisbie 83'	Stadium: New Meadow; Attendance: 4,718 (291 away); Referee: Michael Barlow

20 August 2025 4	Notts County	4–1	Shrewsbury Town	Nottingham
19:45 BST	Dennis 8'; Norburn (yellow card) 12'; Aljofree 20'; Tsaroulla 47'; Grant (yellow card) 78', (goal) 82'; Gordon (yellow card) 81'	Report	Marquis 32', (yellow card) 90'; Stubbs (yellow card) 41'; Nurse (yellow card) 90+3'	Stadium: Meadow Lane; Attendance: 8,810 (527 away); Referee: Darren Drysdale
Note: Fixture was originally scheduled for 19 August, but was moved due to a clash with cricket at Trent Bridge.

23 August 2025 5	Swindon Town	2–1	Shrewsbury Town	Swindon
15:00 BST	Drinan 7'; Bodin 90+3'; Ripley (yellow card) 90+6'	Report	Benning (yellow card) 35'; Sang (yellow card) 45+3'; Stewart 90'	Stadium: County Ground; Attendance: 7,498 (370 away); Referee: Lee Swabey

30 August 2025 6	Shrewsbury Town	0–0	Accrington Stanley	Shrewsbury
15:00 BST	Kabia (yellow card) 43'; Perry (yellow card) 66'; Boyle (yellow card) 67'	Report	Matthews (yellow card) 39'; Love (yellow card) 61'; Henderson (yellow card) 76'	Stadium: New Meadow; Attendance: 4,795; Referee: Oliver Mackey

6 September 2025 7	Barnet	1–3	Shrewsbury Town	Edgware
15:00 BST	Shelton 14'; High (yellow card) 33'	Report	Anderson (yellow card) 6'; Collinge 15' (o.g.); Ihionvien 25', (yellow card) 26'; Clucas 42'; Marquis (yellow card) 44'; McDermott (yellow card) 84'; Lloyd (yellow card) 88'	Stadium: The Hive Stadium; Attendance: 3,009 (490 away); Referee: Kirsty Dowle

13 September 2025 8	Shrewsbury Town	1–3	Salford City	Shrewsbury
15:00 BST	Clucas 47'; Harrison (yellow card) 71'	Report	Mnoga (yellow card) 1'; Udoh 28', 90+2'; Cooper (yellow card) 59'; Woodburn 82'	Stadium: New Meadow; Attendance: 5,054 (229 away); Referee: Peter Wright

20 September 2025 9	Harrogate Town	2–0	Shrewsbury Town	Harrogate
12:30 BST	Taylor (yellow card) 31'; Evans (yellow card) 62'; Muldoon 65'; Slater (yellow card) 71'; McAleny 87'	Report	Perry (yellow card) 2'; Sang (yellow card) 39'; Ihionvien (yellow card) 39'	Stadium: Wetherby Road; Attendance: 2,819 (629 away); Referee: Ross Joyce
Note: Fixture was originally scheduled for a 15:00 kick-off, but was moved live Sky Sports broadcasting.

27 September 2025 10	Shrewsbury Town	1–2	Milton Keynes Dons	Shrewsbury
15:00 BST	Ihionvien (yellow card) 38'; Hoole (yellow card) 45'; Aneke 76'	Report	Hogan 3'; Collar 39'	Stadium: New Meadow; Attendance: 4,854 (456 away); Referee: Martin Coy

4 October 2025 11	Barrow	0–0	Shrewsbury Town	Barrow-in-Furness
15:00 BST	Gordon (yellow card) 74'; Fletcher (yellow card) 90+1'	Report	Kabia (yellow card) 90+3'; Aneke (yellow card) 90+6'	Stadium: Holker Street; Attendance: 3,047 (376 away); Referee: Ross Martin

11 October 2025 12	Shrewsbury Town	2–0	Cambridge United	Shrewsbury
15:00 BST	Lloyd 12'; Boyle 36'; Sang (yellow card) 54'; Scully (yellow card) 57'	Report	Smith (yellow card) 55'	Stadium: New Meadow; Attendance: 4,827 (370 away); Referee: Matthew Russell

18 October 2025 13	Shrewsbury Town	1–0	Crawley Town	Shrewsbury
15:00 BST	Sang (yellow card) 38'; Lloyd (yellow card) 82'; Boyle 84'; Aneke (yellow card) 90+8'	Report	McKirdy (yellow card) 31' (yellow-red card) 65'; Flint (yellow card) 44'; Anderson (yellow card) 72'; Conroy (yellow card) 90+6'	Stadium: New Meadow; Attendance: 4,743 (166 away); Referee: Ben Atkinson

25 October 2025 14	Oldham Athletic	2–2	Shrewsbury Town	Oldham
15:00 BST	Pett 51'; Garner (yellow card) 87', (goal) 90+5'	Report	Brook (yellow card) 26'; Scully 46'; Hoole (yellow card) 81'; Stubbs (yellow card) 87'; McDermott 90+1', (yellow card) 90+1'	Stadium: Boundary Park; Attendance: 7,361 (815 away); Referee: Abigail Byrne

8 November 2025 15	Crewe Alexandra	3–1	Shrewsbury Town	Crewe
12:30 GMT	Lunt 21'; O'Reilly 56'; Sanders (yellow card) 90+1'; Bogle 90+3', (yellow card) 90+4'	Report	Ruffels 29'; Stubbs (yellow card) 36'; Boyle (yellow card) 43'; Hoole (yellow card) 50'; Sang (yellow card) 90+1'	Stadium: Gresty Road; Attendance: 6,614 (1,674 away); Referee: Tom Reeves
Note: Fixture was originally scheduled for a 15:00 kick-off, but was rescheduled for live Sky Sports broadcasting.

15 November 2025 16	Shrewsbury Town	1–0	Newport County	Shrewsbury
15:00 GMT	McDermott (yellow card) 49'; Scully 51'; Anderson (yellow card) 62'; Ruffels (yellow card) 77'; Sang (yellow card) 90+4'	Report	Braybrooke (yellow card) 57'; Garner (yellow card) 84'	Stadium: New Meadow; Attendance: 6,120 (759 away); Referee: Elliott Swallow

22 November 2025 17	Fleetwood Town	3–1	Shrewsbury Town	Fleetwood
15:00 GMT	Bolton (yellow card) 19' (yellow-red card) 90+4'; Graydon 24'; McCann 56'; Virtue 72'	Report	Kabia 83'; Aneke (yellow card) 90+4'	Stadium: Highbury Stadium; Attendance: 2,731 (446 away); Referee: Martin Coy

29 November 2025 18	Shrewsbury Town	3–3	Gillingham	Shrewsbury
15:00 GMT	Lloyd 10', 45+4'; Hoole 22'; Boyle (yellow card) 34'; Kabia (yellow card) 61'	Report	Stubbs 37' (o.g.); Andrews (yellow card) 57'; McKenzie 66' (pen.); Cirino (yellow card) 81'; Nevitt 86'	Stadium: New Meadow; Attendance: 5,217 (484 away); Referee: Aaron Farmer

9 December 2025 19	Shrewsbury Town	1–1	Grimsby Town	Shrewsbury
19:45 GMT	Marquis 45+2'; Stubbs (yellow card) 78'; Aneke (yellow card) 82'	Report	Vernam 38' (pen.); Burns (yellow card) 72'; Rodgers (yellow card) 90+5'	Stadium: New Meadow; Attendance: 4,389 (336 away); Referee: Sam Mulhall

13 December 2025 20	Walsall	1–1	Shrewsbury Town	Bescot
15:00 GMT	Kanu 3'; Jellis (yellow card) 86'	Report	Perry (yellow card) 35'; Kabia (yellow card) 58'; Anderson 65', (yellow card) 90+4'; McDermott (yellow card) 85'	Stadium: Bescot Stadium; Attendance: 7,342 (1,199 away); Referee: Isaac Searle

20 December 2025 21	Shrewsbury Town	0–1	Chesterfield	Shrewsbury
15:00 GMT		Report	Bonis 61', (yellow card) 75'; McFadzean (yellow card) 67'; Naylor (yellow card) 82'	Stadium: New Meadow; Attendance: 5,890 (991 away)

26 December 2025 22	Cheltenham Town	3–1	Shrewsbury Town	Cheltenham
15:00 GMT	Adelakun 14'; Bickerstaff 31'; Hutchinson 54' (pen.); Day (yellow card) 70'; Jude-Boyd (yellow card) 89'	Report	Marquis 63'; Boyle (yellow card) 73'; Perry (yellow card) 90'; McDermott (yellow card) 90+2'	Stadium: Whaddon Road; Attendance: 5,553 (621 away); Referee: Richard Eley

29 December 2025 23	Grimsby Town	1–0	Shrewsbury Town	Cleethorpes
19:45 GMT	Tharme (yellow card) 48'; Khouri (yellow card) 68'; Amaluzor 83'	Report	Marquis (yellow card) 69'; Perry (yellow card) 90+1'	Stadium: Blundell Park; Attendance: 5,386 (154 away); Referee: Steven Copeland

1 January 2026 24	Shrewsbury Town	0–3	Bristol Rovers	Shrewsbury
15:00 GMT	Boyle (yellow card) 43'; England (yellow card) 67'	Report	Cavegn 63', 88', 90+3'; Moore (yellow card) 68'	Stadium: New Meadow; Attendance: 5,872 (611 away); Referee: Rob Massey-Ellis

17 January 2026 27	Shrewsbury Town	1–0	Harrogate Town	Shrewsbury
15:00 GMT	Perry 62'; Clucas (yellow card) 90+4'; Marquis (yellow card) 90+4'; McDermott (yellow card) 90+5'	Report	Evans (yellow card) 3' (yellow-red card) 51'; Headman (yellow card) 23'; Smith (yellow card) 70'; O'Connor (yellow card) 89'; Thomson (yellow card) 90+5'; Cass (yellow card) 90+6'	Stadium: New Meadow; Attendance: 4,638 (121 away); Referee: Peter Wright

24 January 2026 28	Milton Keynes Dons	5–1	Shrewsbury Town	Denbigh
15:00 GMT	Paterson 8', 11' (pen.), 34'; Nemane (yellow card) 31'; Offord 81'; Crowley 88'	Report	Morgan (yellow card) 7'; Hoole (yellow card) 10'; Perry (yellow card) 40'; Sang 83'; Clucas (yellow card) 90+3'	Stadium: Stadium MK; Attendance: 7,336 (485 away); Referee: Alan Dale

27 January 2026 29	Cambridge United	1–0	Shrewsbury Town	Cambridge
19:45 GMT	Appéré (yellow card) 59'; Knight 90+1' (pen.)	Report	Clucas (yellow card) 90+1'	Stadium: Abbey Stadium; Attendance: 5,347 (168 away); Referee: Abigail Byrne

31 January 2026 30	Shrewsbury Town	0–0	Barnet	Shrewsbury
15:00 GMT				Stadium: New Meadow

7 February 2026 31	Colchester United	2–0	Shrewsbury Town	Colchester
15:00 GMT	Goodwin 4'; Read 37'; Lisbie (yellow card) 53'; Hunt (yellow card) 78'; Macey (yellow card) 84'; Vincent-Young (yellow card) 90'	Report	Freeman (yellow card) 10'; Ruffels (yellow card) 54'	Stadium: Colchester Community Stadium; Attendance: 4,932 (251 away); Referee: James Oldham

10 February 2026 26	Shrewsbury Town	2–1	Barrow	Shrewsbury
19:45 GMT	Scully 47'; Hoole 54'; Benning (yellow card) 80'; Lloyd (yellow card) 89'	Report	Newby (yellow card) 57'; Walker 75'	Stadium: New Meadow; Attendance: 4,116 (84 away); Referee: Matthew Corlett
Note: Fixture was initially scheduled for 10 January, but was rearranged due to FA Cup progression.

14 February 2026 32	Shrewsbury Town	3–1	Swindon Town	Shrewsbury
15:00 GMT	Morgan 7', (yellow card) 45+5'; Hoole (yellow card) 22'; Berkoe (yellow card) 32'; Lloyd 58'; Freeman 82'	Report	Clarke (yellow card) 31'; Kirkman 45+2'; Ball (yellow card) 45+5'; Borland (yellow card) 88'	Stadium: New Meadow; Attendance: 7,403 (1,323 away); Referee: Harry Wager

17 February 2026 33	Shrewsbury Town	1–0	Notts County	Shrewsbury
19:45 GMT	Perry 54'	Report	Enoru (yellow card) 63'; Macari (yellow card) 90+5'; Bedeau (yellow card) 90+5'	Stadium: New Meadow; Attendance: 6,554 (932 away); Referee: William Davis

21 February 2026 34	Accrington Stanley	0–2	Shrewsbury Town	Accrington
15:00 GMT	Heath (yellow card) 52'; Conneely (yellow card) 61'; Smith (yellow card) 74'	Report	Morgan 1'; Hoole 48'	Stadium: Crown Ground; Attendance: 2,342 (547 away); Referee: Ross Joyce

24 February 2026 25	Salford City	1–2	Shrewsbury Town	Kersal
19:4 GMT	Hoole 45+2' (o.g.); N'Mai (yellow card) 87'	Report	Sang 51'; Boyle 76'; Benning (yellow card) 90+4'	Stadium: Moor Lane; Attendance: 2,540 (574 away); Referee: Andrew Humphries
Note: Fixture was originally scheduled for 4 January, but it was postponed due to a frozen pitch.

28 February 2026 35	Shrewsbury Town	1–2	Walsall	Shrewsbury
12:30 GMT	Morgan 45+6'; Boyle (yellow card) 61'; Ruffels (red card) 90+2'	Report	Farquharson 28', 62'; Hornby (yellow card) 85'	Stadium: New Meadow; Attendance: 7,879 (1,640 away); Referee: Richard Eley
Note: Fixture was initially scheduled for a 15:00 kick-off, but was rescheduled for live Sky Sports broadcasting.

7 March 2026 36	Chesterfield	2–3	Shrewsbury Town	Chesterfield
15:00 GMT	Naylor 31'; Pearce 85'; Dobra (yellow card) 90+2'	Report	Samuel-Ogunsuyi 45+2', 70', (yellow card) 84'; Cox (yellow card) 80'; Stubbs 90+3'	Stadium: SMH Group Stadium; Attendance: 8,118 (653 away); Referee: Alan Dale

14 March 2026 37	Shrewsbury Town	0–2	Cheltenham Town	Shrewsbury
15:00 GMT	Perry (yellow card) 35'; Berkoe (yellow card) 90+8'	Report	Cundy (yellow card) 17'; Young (yellow card) 19'; Thomas 63'; Sherring 71'; Day (yellow card) 90+2'	Stadium: New Meadow; Attendance: 5,786 (415 away); Referee: Lewis Sandoe

17 March 2026 38	Bristol Rovers	1–0	Shrewsbury Town	Horfield
19:45 GMT	Harbottle (yellow card) 38'; Leigh 79'	Report	McDermott (yellow card) 90+11'	Stadium: Memorial Stadium; Attendance: 6,834 (353 away)

21 March 2026 39	Shrewsbury Town	0–4	Crewe Alexandra	Shrewsbury
15:00 GMT		Report	Cox 5' (o.g.); March 8', 63', (yellow card) 64'; Lankester (yellow card) 45+1'; Tezgel 70', (yellow card) 71'	Stadium: New Meadow; Attendance: 7,041 (1,648 away); Referee: Jamie O'Connor

28 March 2026 40	Newport County	1–0	Shrewsbury Town	Newport
15:00 GMT	Evans (yellow card) 45+4'; Kamwa 68'; Garner (yellow card) 90+1'	Report	Benning (yellow card) 29'; Boyle (yellow card) 71'; Perry (yellow card) 90+3'	Stadium: Rodney Parade; Attendance: 4,806 (766 away); Referee: Elliot Bell

3 April 2026 41	Shrewsbury Town	1–0	Tranmere Rovers	Shrewsbury
15:00 BST	Stubbs 55'	Report	Brough (yellow card) 86'	Stadium: New Meadow; Attendance: 7,012 (1,650 away); Referee: Oliver Yates

7 April 2026 42	Bromley	2–1	Shrewsbury Town	Bromley
20:00 BST	Ifill 38'; Cameron 49'	Report	Ihionvien 6', (yellow card) 45+1'; Berkoe (yellow card) 48'; Stubbs (yellow card) 84'	Stadium: Hayes Lane; Attendance: 4,780 (307 away); Referee: Abigail Byrne
Note: Fixture was initially scheduled for 6 April, but was moved for Sky Sports broadcasting.

11 April 2026 43	Shrewsbury Town	1–0	Oldham Athletic	Shrewsbury
15:00 BST	Boyle 30'; Morgan (yellow card) 47'; Ihionvien (yellow card) 77'	Report	Garner (yellow card) 62'; Jaló (yellow card) 87'	Stadium: New Meadow; Attendance: 6,609 (1,638 away); Referee: Emily Heaslip

18 April 2026 44	Crawley Town	0–0	Shrewsbury Town	Crawley
15:00 BST	Malone (yellow card) 17'	Report	Sang (yellow card) 88'	Stadium: Broadfield Stadium; Attendance: 3,602; Referee: Craig Hicks

25 April 2026 45	Shrewsbury Town	2–2	Fleetwood Town	Shrewsbury
15:00 BST	Gray (yellow card) 61'; Ruffels 72'; Kabia 90+6'	Report	Perry 40' (o.g.); McLean 59'; Davies (yellow card) 61'; Cirino (yellow card) 90+4'	Stadium: New Meadow; Attendance: 5,665; Referee: Harrison Blair

2 May 2026 46	Gillingham	1–0	Shrewsbury Town	Gillingham
15:00 BST	Hale (yellow card) 37'; McCleary 90+2'	Report	Perry (yellow card) 31'; Gray (yellow card) 57'	Stadium: Priestfield Stadium; Attendance: 6,145 (inc. 541 away); Referee: David Rock

=== FA Cup ===
Shrewsbury were drawn away to South Shields in the first round, to Sutton United in the second round and to Wolverhampton Wanderers in the third round.

Win Draw Loss Fixtures

2 November 2025 First round	South Shields	1–3	Shrewsbury Town	Jarrow
12:00 GMT	Morse (yellow card) 45+5'; Woolston 67'; Carson (yellow card) 71'	Report	Scully 23' (pen.), 34'; Marquis (yellow card) 41'; Sang 44'; McDermott (yellow card) 70'	Stadium: Mariners Park; Attendance: 3,570; Referee: Thomas Parsons

6 December 2025 Second round	Sutton United	1–2 (a.e.t.)	Shrewsbury Town	Sutton
17:15 GMT	Pruti (yellow card) 9'; Ogbonna (yellow card) 12' (yellow-red card) 90+3'; Muller (yellow card) 31'; Jennings 69'; Taylor (yellow card) 74'; Eccleston (red card) 111'; Simper (yellow card) 120+3'	Report	Stubbs (yellow card) 1'; Ruffels (yellow card) 50' (yellow-red card) 79'; Kabia 90+1'; Marquis 92'; Clucas (yellow card) 90+6'; Aneke (yellow card) 119'	Stadium: Gander Green Lane; Attendance: 2,504 (369 away); Referee: Jacob Miles

10 January 2026 Third round	Wolverhampton Wanderers	6–1	Shrewsbury Town	Wolverhampton
12:15 GMT	Larsen 9', 41', 58'; Arias 11'; Gomes 86'; André (yellow card) 90+1'; Arokodare 90+2'	Report	Ruffels (yellow card) 14'; Marquis 26' (pen.); Anderson (yellow card) 69'	Stadium: Molineux Stadium; Attendance: 24,258 (2,982 away); Referee: Stephen Martin

=== EFL Cup ===
Shrewsbury were drawn away to Grimsby Town in the first round.

Win Draw Loss Fixtures

12 August 2025 First round	Grimsby Town	3–1	Shrewsbury Town	Cleethorpes
19:45 BST	Amaluzor 15'; Walker (penalty missed) 27'; Gardner 50'; Kabia 90+2' (pen.)	Report	Benning (yellow card) 4'; Anderson (yellow card) 26'; Clucas (yellow card) 47'; Sang 63'; Hoole (yellow card) 81'	Stadium: Blundell Park; Attendance: 3,156 (134 away); Referee: Seb Stockbridge

=== EFL Trophy ===
Shrewsbury were drawn against Northampton Town, Walsall and Chelsea U21 in the group stage.

Pos	Div	Team	Pld	W	PW	PL	L	GF	GA	GD	Pts	Qualification
1	L1	Northampton Town	3	3	0	0	0	6	1	+5	9	Advance to Round 2
2	L2	Walsall	3	1	1	0	1	3	2	+1	5	Advance to Round 2
3	L2	Shrewsbury Town	3	1	0	0	2	5	6	−1	3	
4	ACA	Chelsea U21	3	0	0	1	2	1	6	−5	1	

Source: EFL

Win Draw Loss Fixtures

26 August 2025 South Group C	Shrewsbury Town	3–1	Chelsea U21	Shrewsbury
19:00 BST	McDermott 14', (yellow card) 61'; Perry (yellow card) 29'; Marquis 65'; Boyle 72', (yellow card) 88'; Clucas (yellow card) 79'	Report	Mheuka 10'; Cardoso (yellow card) 21'; Tauriainen (yellow card) 27'	Stadium: New Meadow; Attendance: 1,714 (134 away); Referee: Garreth Rhodes

2 September 2025 South Group C	Shrewsbury Town	1–3	Walsall	Shrewsbury
19:00 BST	Ihionvien 10'; Boyle (yellow card) 75'; Gray (yellow card) 90+1'	Report	Finnigan 5', (yellow card) 27'; Comley (yellow card) 31'; Maher (yellow card) 67'; Adomah 67'; Okeke 80'	Stadium: New Meadow; Attendance: 2,004 (551 away); Referee: Declan Bourne

11 November 2025 South Group C	Northampton Town	2–1	Shrewsbury Town	Northampton
19:00 GMT	Swyer (yellow card) 27', (goal) 29'; Taylor (yellow card) 75'; McCarthy 78'; Eaves (yellow card) 83'	Report	Anderson (yellow card) 23'; McDermott 37'; Benning (yellow card) 45+1'	Stadium: Sixfields Stadium; Attendance: 802 (85 away); Referee: Wayne Cartmel

== Statistics ==
=== Appearances and goals ===
Players with no appearances are not included on the list; italics indicate a loaned in player

No.	Pos	Nat	Player	Total		League Two		FA Cup		EFL Cup		EFL Trophy	
No.	Pos	Nat	Player	Apps	Goals	Apps	Goals	Apps	Goals	Apps	Goals	Apps	Goals
1	GK	(England) ENG	Matthew Cox	18	0	18+0	0	0+0	0	0+0	0	0+0	0
2	DF	(Wales) WAL	Luca Hoole	41	3	28+6	3	2+1	0	1+0	0	2+1	0
3	DF	(England) ENG	Mal Benning	21	0	8+8	0	0+1	0	1+0	0	2+1	0
4	DF	(England) ENG	Tom Anderson	35	1	25+3	1	3+0	0	1+0	0	3+0	0
5	DF	(England) ENG	Will Boyle	48	5	42+1	4	3+0	0	0+0	0	2+0	1
6	MF	(England) ENG	Sam Clucas	40	2	31+3	2	3+0	0	1+0	0	1+1	0
7	MF	(England) ENG	Tommy McDermott	41	3	17+17	1	2+1	0	0+1	0	3+0	2
8	MF	(England) ENG	Harrison Biggins	9	0	4+2	0	0+1	0	0+0	0	1+1	0
9	FW	(England) ENG	George Lloyd	47	4	25+18	4	1+1	0	1+0	0	0+1	0
10	DF	(England) ENG	Tom Sang	42	4	28+8	2	1+1	1	1+0	1	2+1	0
11	FW	(Republic of Ireland) IRL	Anthony Scully	35	5	23+8	3	2+0	2	0+1	0	1+0	0
12	GK	(England) ENG	Will Brook	24	0	20+0	0	2+0	0	0+0	0	2+0	0
14	MF	(England) ENG	Taylor Perry	49	2	34+8	2	1+2	0	1+0	0	2+1	0
16	MF	(England) ENG	Nick Freeman	16	1	8+8	1	0+0	0	0+0	0	0+0	0
17	MF	(England) ENG	Alex Gilliead	4	0	2+1	0	0+0	0	0+1	0	0+0	0
19	FW	(Wales) WAL	Iwan Morgan	22	3	19+2	3	1+0	0	0+0	0	0+0	0
20	FW	(Netherlands) NED	Ismeal Kabia	43	3	34+4	2	3+0	1	0+0	0	1+1	0
21	FW	(Belgium) BEL	Trey Samuel-Ogunsuyi	13	2	6+6	2	0+1	0	0+0	0	0+0	0
22	DF	(Italy) ITA	Temple Ojinnaka	4	0	3+1	0	0+0	0	0+0	0	0+0	0
23	DF	(South Korea) KOR	Isaac Lee	3	0	3+0	0	0+0	0	0+0	0	0+0	0
24	FW	(England) ENG	Callum Stewart	8	1	1+4	1	0+0	0	1+0	0	1+1	0
25	DF	(England) ENG	Josh Ruffels	32	2	25+3	2	3+0	0	0+0	0	1+0	0
26	DF	(England) ENG	Sam Stubbs	33	2	28+1	2	2+0	0	0+0	0	2+0	0
27	FW	(England) ENG	John Marquis	43	6	29+7	3	2+1	2	0+1	0	2+1	1
30	DF	(England) ENG	Kevin Berkoe	18	0	17+1	0	0+0	0	0+0	0	0+0	0
38	MF	(England) ENG	Isaac England	20	0	4+12	0	1+0	0	0+0	0	2+1	0
42	MF	(England) ENG	Jack Loughran	1	0	0+0	0	0+1	0	0+0	0	0+0	0
43	MF	(England) ENG	Will Gray	8	0	4+2	0	0+0	0	0+0	0	0+2	0
46	MF	(England) ENG	Hugo Aiston	1	0	0+1	0	0+0	0	0+0	0	0+0	0
48	FW	(England) ENG	Bradley Ihionvien	13	3	8+4	2	0+0	0	0+0	0	1+0	1
Players who featured but departed the club during the season:
1	GK	(England) ENG	Elyh Harrison	9	0	6+0	0	1+0	0	1+0	0	1+0	0
13	GK	(England) ENG	Toby Savin	2	0	2+0	0	0+0	0	0+0	0	0+0	0
15	FW	(England) ENG	Chuks Aneke	15	1	0+13	1	0+1	0	0+0	0	0+1	0
22	DF	(Democratic Republic of the Congo) COD	Aristote Nsiala	5	0	2+1	0	0+0	0	1+0	0	1+0	0
23	DF	(England) ENG	George Nurse	5	0	2+2	0	0+0	0	1+0	0	0+0	0
