= Tom Anderson (footballer) =

English footballer (born 1993)

Personal information
- Full name: Thomas Robert Anderson
- Date of birth: 2 September 1993 (age 33)
- Place of birth: Burnley, England
- Height: 6 ft 4 in (1.93 m)
- Position: Defender

Team information
- Current team: Carlisle United (on loan from Shrewsbury Town)
- Number: 31

Youth career
- 2000–2012: Burnley

Senior career*
Years	Team	Apps	(Gls)
2012–2018	Burnley	0	(0)
2012–2013	→ Barrow (loan)	18	(0)
2013	→ Hyde (loan)	4	(0)
2013–2014	→ FC Halifax Town (loan)	1	(0)
2014	→ Lincoln City (loan)	6	(1)
2014–2015	→ Carlisle United (loan)	8	(0)
2016	→ Chesterfield (loan)	18	(0)
2016–2017	→ Chesterfield (loan)	35	(2)
2017–2018	→ Port Vale (loan)	20	(0)
2018	→ Doncaster Rovers (loan)	7	(2)
2018–2025	Doncaster Rovers	208	(8)
2025–	Shrewsbury Town	28	(1)
2026–	→ Carlisle United (loan)	0	(0)
- * Club domestic league appearances and goals as of 19:22, 3 May 2026 (UTC)

Thomas Robert Anderson (born 2 September 1993) is an English footballer who plays as a defender for National League club Carlisle United, on loan from EFL League Two club Shrewsbury Town.

Having been associated with Burnley from the age of seven, he became a professional at the club in May 2012. He spent the first half of the 2012–13 season on loan at Barrow and had a brief stay on loan at Hyde in the second half of the campaign. He joined FC Halifax Town and Lincoln City on loan in November 2013 and September 2014 respectively, before making his debut in the English Football League on loan at Carlisle United in November 2014. He spent the second half of the 2015–16 season and the 2016–17 campaign on loan at Chesterfield. He joined Port Vale on loan for the first half of the 2017–18 season and was then loaned to Doncaster Rovers for the second half of the season before he joined Doncaster Rovers permanently in May 2018. He won the League Two title with the club at the end of the 2024–25 season and then signed with Shrewsbury Town. He was loaned to Carlisle United in September 2026.

== Career ==
=== Burnley ===
Anderson started his career in the Centre of Excellence at Burnley, joining the club as a seven-year-old. He progressed through the Centre of Excellence and went on to join the under-18 side, signing a two-year scholarship in the summer of 2010. He was captain of the Burnley side that reached the semi-finals of the 2011–12 FA Youth Cup, however, he missed the tail end of the season due to a bout of Infectious mononucleosis. In May 2012, on completion of his scholarship he signed his first professional contract on a one-year deal.

==== Conference loans ====
In August 2012, he signed for Conference Premier side Barrow on loan until January 2013, along with fellow Burnley player Joe Jackson. He made his first-team debut in a 0–0 draw with AFC Telford United at Holker Street on 11 August. He established himself as a first-team regular as the "Bluebirds" struggled towards the bottom end of the table. Barrow manager David Bayliss looked into extending his loan deal but Anderson returned to Burnley in January, having made 21 appearances for the club. In January 2013 upon his return to Turf Moor, he made first-team bench for the 2–0 away win at Millwall, remaining an unused substitute.

A month later, he joined Conference Premier side Hyde on a one-month loan deal. His debut came against Kidderminster Harriers in a 4–0 away defeat on 16 February, when he replaced Josh Brizell as a second-half substitute. His first start for the club came three days later in a 1–0 defeat to Mansfield Town at Ewen Fields. He returned to Burnley late in February, having only made four appearances for Scott McNiven's "Tigers", after his loan was cut short due to a knee ligament injury he picked up in a 5–1 defeat at Alfreton Town. In April 2013, he signed a new one-year contract extension with Burnley despite having not recovered from his knee injury.

In November 2013, after recovering from his injury, he signed up for Conference Premier side FC Halifax Town on loan until January 2014. He played in a West Riding County Cup game defeat at Harrogate Town on 4 December, partnering 16-year-old Jack Bradle at centre-back, and after the game was praised by manager Neil Aspin. He made his league debut for the club three days later in a 4–3 defeat to Woking at The Shay. It proved to be his only league appearance for the "Shaymen" as he struggled to get into the team due to the good form of other players, and he returned to Burnley in January.

In July 2014, he signed another one-year extension with Burnley following the club's promotion to the Premier League. In September 2014, he was sent out on loan again, joining Conference Premier side Lincoln City on a one-month loan deal. He went straight into Gary Simpson's first-team, making his debut in a 1–0 defeat at Aldershot Town on 20 September. He scored his first senior goal ten days later in a 1–1 draw with Gateshead at Sincil Bank, scoring the opener with a header. In October 2014, he returned to Burnley having made six appearances for the "Imps" after a loan extension could not be agreed between the two clubs.

==== Carlisle United loan ====
Later in the month, he joined League Two club Carlisle United on an initial one-month loan deal. He made his debut for the "Cumbrians" in a 3–0 defeat at Portsmouth on 1 November, and earned praise from boss Keith Curle despite the heavy defeat. His loan was extended for a further month after he impressed in his first four appearances for the "Blues". In January 2015, he returned to Burnley following the 2–1 defeat to Newport County, having made nine appearances during his stay at Brunton Park.

==== Chesterfield loans ====
On 1 February 2016, he joined League One side Chesterfield on loan until the end of the 2015–16 season. Speaking the following month, manager Danny Wilson said that "he has made a big, big difference to us at the back" and that "nobody notices him because it's just been so seamless with what he's been doing". At the end of the season, he returned to Burnley having played 18 games for the "Spireites", who posted an 18th-place finish.

On 31 August 2016, Anderson re-signed for Chesterfield on loan until the end of the 2016–17 season. He was named on the EFL Team of the Week for his performance in a 0–0 draw at Oldham Athletic on 10 September. On 6 December, he was sent off for the first time in his career for a foul on Aaron Morley in a 2–0 EFL Trophy victory at Rochdale. On 14 February, he scored an injury-time equaliser to secure a point in a 1–1 draw away at relegation rivals Gillingham. However, four days later he received his second red card of the season in a 2–1 defeat by Bury at the Proact Stadium; after the match manager Gary Caldwell said that "you're a defender, it's going to happen". On 17 April, he scored a late consolation goal in a 3–1 defeat at Scunthorpe United, a result which relegated Chesterfield into League Two. He was a regular starter for Chesterfield, making 39 appearances in all competitions across the campaign.

==== Port Vale loan ====
On 31 August 2017, Anderson joined newly relegated League Two side Port Vale on a season-long loan. He said he was looking forward to linking up again with defensive coach Chris Morgan, who had previously coached at Chesterfield. He made his debut for the "Valiants" on 12 September as captain Antony Kay was dropped, and Anderson was praised for his performance despite the team suffering a 2–0 defeat at Luton Town. Despite being signed to the "Valiants" by Michael Brown, Anderson initially struggled for games and only actually went on to establish himself as an important part of the first-team under new manager Neil Aspin, forming an effective centre-back partnership with Nathan Smith. However, he was recalled by Burnley on 29 January, much to Aspin's surprise and disappointment.

=== Doncaster Rovers ===
On 31 January 2018, Anderson joined League One side Doncaster Rovers on loan until the end of the 2017–18 season. After scoring twice in Doncaster's 3–0 victory over Fleetwood Town at the Keepmoat Stadium on 17 February, he made the EFL Team of the Week. However, he was sidelined for two months after fracturing his cheekbone in a 2–1 defeat at Rotherham United seven days later; "Donny" manager Darren Ferguson said that "It's a bad injury but it could've been worse in many ways. He's a tough boy, he'll get on with it". He signed a two-year contract with Doncaster on 17 May 2018. He scored two goals in 33 appearances during the 2018–19 season, having battled with Joe Wright and loanee Paul Downing to partner Andy Butler in central defence; manager Grant McCann had signed Downing in the January transfer window.

He was sent off for a foul on Matt Bloomfield in a 1–0 defeat at Wycombe Wanderers on 23 November 2019. He signed a new contract on New Year's Day to keep him at the club until summer 2022, and was described as a "tower of strength" by manager Darren Moore. The 2019–20 campaign was described as a "breakout season" for Anderson by Doncaster Free Press reporter Liam Hoden, who wrote that he had "rarely been unduly troubled by an opposition forward" and was unmatched in aerial duels whilst his positioning skills had greatly improved.

Anderson performed excellently throughout the 2020–21 campaign, improving his distribution skills whilst maintaining his tackling and positional ability. Speaking in March, he said that he wanted the team to get interim manager Andy Butler's career off to a good start as he was well-liked and respected in the dressing room. He scored two goals in 51 games as Doncaster posted a 14th-place finish, though admitted that veteran midfielder James Coppinger was right to question the squad's desire after a late play-off push was ended with a run of just two wins in 14 games.

Speaking in July 2021, manager Richie Wellens confirmed that Anderson and Ro-Shaun Williams would be Doncaster's starting centre-back pairing for the new season, hailing Anderson as the "best centre half in the league". He went on to tell his squad to emulate Anderson in his determination to stick to the basics. However, Anderson missed the second half of the 2021–22 season, with new manager Gary McSheffrey confirming that a plantar fascia injury in his foot kept causing him to break down. Nevertheless, the club activated an option to extend his expiring contract for a further year as they adjusted to life in League Two following relegation.

Following the departure of Adam Clayton in January 2023, Anderson was made first-team captain. Manager Danny Schofield said that he wanted to build the squad around Anderson, who signed a new two-and-a-half-year contract the following month. He made 26 appearances in the 2022–23 campaign. In September 2023, Anderson spoke about the mental struggle he suffered over the previous two years as he battled with various injury problems. Speaking again two months later, with the club 19th in League Two, he said that he was confident the team would begin to pick up results. Manager Grant McCann called him a "tremendous servant to the club" after Anderson made his 200th club appearance. He missed eight matches mid-season with a back injury. He played 34 league games in the 2023–24 season as Doncaster secured a play-off place. He was the only centre-half to score for Rovers in the campaign.

He was sent off on 28 September 2024 following an off-the-ball incident with Chey Dunkley in a 3–0 defeat at Chesterfield. He was suspended for six matches for the incident and fined £3,000 after admitting to using threatening and abusive language to a match official following his dismissal. McCann said that the decision was "unfair" and only warranted a yellow card. It left Anderson to spend two months on the sidelines as Jay McGrath and Joseph Olowu developed a centre-back partnership. He played 29 league games in the 2024–25 season as Doncaster won the League Two title.

=== Shrewsbury Town ===
On 16 May 2025, Anderson was announced to have signed a two-year contract with Shrewsbury Town, due to start on 1 July. The club were looking to rebuild under director of football Micky Moore and manager Michael Appleton following the club's relegation into League Two. Speaking in December, Anderson said the Shrews feared no-one in the division after he scored the equalising goal against league leaders Walsall. He ended the 2025–26 season with 35 appearances to his name, and was transfer listed by new manager Gavin Cowan.

On 30 September 2026, he returned to Carlisle United, now struggling in the National League, on loan until the end of December. Head coach Rob Elliot said that he would "add quality and competition to the squad".

== Style of play ==
The Sheffield Star described Anderson as a "straightforward 'kick it and head it' defender". Speaking in March 2017, Burnley manager Sean Dyche praised his mentality, will and desire.

== Career statistics ==
As of match played 25 April 2026

Appearances and goals by club, season and competition
Club	Season	League			FA Cup		League Cup		Other		Total	
Club	Season	Division	Apps	Goals	Apps	Goals	Apps	Goals	Apps	Goals	Apps	Goals
Burnley	2012–13	Championship	0	0	—		—		—		0	0
Burnley	2013–14	Championship	0	0	—		0	0	—		0	0
Burnley	2014–15	Premier League	0	0	—		0	0	—		0	0
Burnley	2015–16	Championship	0	0	0	0	0	0	—		0	0
Burnley	2016–17	Premier League	0	0	—		0	0	—		0	0
Burnley	2017–18	Premier League	0	0	—		0	0	—		0	0
Burnley	Total		0	0	0	0	0	0	—		0	0
Barrow (loan)	2012–13	Conference Premier	18	0	2	0	—		1 (Note: Appearance in FA Trophy)	0	21	0
Hyde (loan)	2012–13	Conference Premier	4	0	—		—		—		4	0
FC Halifax Town (loan)	2013–14	Conference Premier	1	0	—		—		1 (Note: Appearance in West Riding County Cup)	0	2	0
Lincoln City (loan)	2014–15	Conference Premier	6	1	—		—		—		6	1
Carlisle United (loan)	2014–15	League Two	8	0	1	0	—		—		9	0
Chesterfield (loan)	2015–16	League One	18	0	—		—		—		18	0
Chesterfield (loan)	2016–17	League One	35	2	2	0	—		3 (Note: Appearance(s) in EFL Trophy)	0	40	2
Chesterfield (loan)	Total		53	2	2	0	—		3	0	58	2
Port Vale (loan)	2017–18	League Two	20	0	3	0	—		1	0	24	0
Doncaster Rovers (loan)	2017–18	League One	7	2	—		—		—		7	2
Doncaster Rovers	2018–19	League One	23	1	6	1	1	0	3	0	33	2
Doncaster Rovers	2019–20	League One	32	1	2	1	1	0	2	0	37	2
Doncaster Rovers	2020–21	League One	44	2	4	0	1	0	2	0	51	2
Doncaster Rovers	2021–22	League One	19	1	2	0	1	0	2	0	24	1
Doncaster Rovers	2022–23	League Two	25	1	0	0	0	0	1	0	26	1
Doncaster Rovers	2023–24	League Two	36	1	2	0	1	0	3 (Note: 1 appearance in EFL Trophy and 2 appearances in play-offs)	0	40	1
Doncaster Rovers	2024–25	League Two	29	1	2	0	0	0	2	0	33	1
Doncaster Rovers	Total		206	10	18	2	5	0	15	0	251	12
Shrewsbury Town	2025–26	League Two	28	1	3	0	1	0	3	0	35	1
Shrewsbury Town	2026–27	League Two	0	0	0	0	0	0	0	0	0	0
Shrewsbury Town	Total		28	1	3	0	1	0	3	0	35	1
Carlisle United (loan)	2026–27	National League	0	0	0	0	—		0	0	0	0
Career total			53	14	27	2	6	0	24	0	410	16

== Honours ==
Doncaster Rovers

- EFL League Two: 2024–25
