= Isaac England =

English footballer

Personal information
- Full name: Isaac Samuel England
- Date of birth: 29 April 2008 (age 18)
- Place of birth: Shrewsbury, England
- Position: Midfielder

Team information
- Current team: AFC Telford United (on loan from Shrewsbury Town)

Senior career*
| Years | Team | Apps | (Gls) |
| 2025– | Shrewsbury Town | 19 | (0) |
| 2026– | → AFC Telford United (loan) | 0 | (0) |
- * Club domestic league appearances and goals as of 09:40, 10 October 2026 (UTC)

Isaac Samuel England (born 29 April 2008) is an English footballer who plays as a midfielder for AFC Telford United on loan from EFL League Two club Shrewsbury Town.

== Career ==
Born in Shrewsbury, England joined hometown club Shrewsbury Town's pre-academy aged five, before officially joining the academy aged eight.

On 21 April 2025, he made his first-team debut for the club as a late substitute in a 4–1 defeat to Northampton Town. Having also featured on the final day of the season, he was part of the under-17s side which won the Professional Development League Trophy.

On 4 August 2025, England signed a first professional three-year contract with the club. Following the previous season's relegation, he broke into the first-team picture during the early weeks of the 2025–26 season, drawing praise from manager Michael Appleton for both his maturity and potential. Persistent ankle injuries limited his game time in the second half of the season, however he did impress new manager Gavin Cowan upon his return to first-team action in April.

On 9 October 2026, England joined National League North club AFC Telford United on an initial one-month loan deal.

== Career statistics ==
As of match played 6 October 2026

Appearances and goals by club, season and competition
| Club | Season | League | | | FA Cup | | League Cup | | Other | | Total | |
| Club | Season | Division | Apps | Goals | Apps | Goals | Apps | Goals | Apps | Goals | Apps | Goals |
|---|---|---|---|---|---|---|---|---|---|---|---|---|
| Shrewsbury Town | 2024–25 | League One | 2 | 0 | 0 | 0 | 0 | 0 | 0 | 0 | 2 | 0 |
| Shrewsbury Town | 2025–26 | League Two | 16 | 0 | 1 | 0 | 0 | 0 | 3 (Note: Appearance(s) in EFL Trophy) | 0 | 20 | 0 |
| Shrewsbury Town | 2026–27 | League Two | 1 | 0 | 0 | 0 | 1 | 0 | 2 | 0 | 4 | 0 |
| Career total | | | 19 | 0 | 1 | 0 | 1 | 0 | 5 | 0 | 26 | 0 |
