= Callum Stewart =

English footballer (born 2001)

Personal information
- Full name: Callum Stewart
- Date of birth: 14 December 2001 (age 24)
- Place of birth: Leamington Spa, England
- Position: Forward

Team information
- Current team: Kidderminster Harriers (on loan from Shrewsbury Town)

Youth career
- Leamington

Senior career*
Years	Team	Apps	(Gls)
2021–2023	Coventry Sphinx	71	(65)
2023–2025	Leamington	63	(31)
2025–	Shrewsbury Town	20	(1)
2025–2026	→ Brackley Town (loan)	7	(0)
2026	→ Aldershot Town (loan)	10	(1)
2026–	→ Kidderminster Harriers (loan)	5	(1)
- * Club domestic league appearances and goals as of 17:11, 1 September 2026 (UTC)

Callum Stewart (born 14 December 2001) is an English professional footballer who plays as a forward for Kidderminster Harriers, on loan from EFL League Two club Shrewsbury Town.

== Career ==
Stewart was born in Leamington Spa, growing up in the town and playing for local club Leamington at youth level. After playing for Coventry Sphinx, he re-signed for Leamington in July 2023. Stewart signed for Shrewsbury Town in January 2025, turning professional and giving up his day job, with Stewart saying he had to "adapt" to the challenge of playing at a higher level.

On 14 October 2025, he joined National League club Brackley Town on loan until January 2026. Brackley had been monitoring Stewart for some time prior to his signing. In March 2026, he returned to the National League on loan, joining Aldershot Town for the remainder of the season.

On 7 August 2026, the eve of the new season, he joined newly promoted National League side Kidderminster Harriers on loan until November.

== Career statistics ==
As of end of 2025–26 season

Appearances and goals by club, season and competition
Club	Season	League			FA Cup		EFL Cup		Other		Total	
Club	Season	Division	Apps	Goals	Apps	Goals	Apps	Goals	Apps	Goals	Apps	Goals
Coventry Sphinx	2021–22	United Counties League Premier Division South	37	31	1	0	—		5 (Note: Appearances in the FA Vase)	9	43	40
Coventry Sphinx	2022–23	United Counties League Premier Division South	34	34	1	0	—		6 (Note: Two appearances and two goals in the United Counties League Cup, four appearances and three goals in the FA Vase)	5	41	39
Coventry Sphinx	Total		71	65	2	0	0	0	11	14	84	79
Leamington	2023–24	Southern League Premier Division Central	40	17	1	1	—		6 (Note: One appearance in the FA Trophy; three appearances and four goals in the Birmingham Senior Cup; two appearances in the play-offs)	4	47	22
Leamington	2024–25	National League North	23	14	0	0	—		2 (Note: Appearances in the FA Trophy)	1	25	15
Leamington	Total		63	31	1	1	0	0	7	5	72	37
Shrewsbury Town	2024–25	League One	15	0	0	0	0	0	0	0	15	0
Shrewsbury Town	2025–26	League Two	5	1	0	0	1	0	2 (Note: Appearances in the EFL Trophy)	0	8	1
Shrewsbury Town	2026–27	League Two	0	0	0	0	0	0	0	0	0	0
Shrewsbury Town	Total		20	1	0	0	1	0	2	0	23	1
Brackley Town (loan)	2025–26	National League	7	0	1	1	—		2 (Note: Appearances in National League Cup)	1	10	2
Aldershot Town (loan)	2025–26	National League	10	1	0	0	—		0	0	10	1
Kidderminster Harriers (loan)	2026–27	National League	0	0	0	0	—		0	0	0	0
Career total			171	98	4	2	1	0	22	20	197	120
