= Ismeal Kabia =

Dutch footballer (born 2005)

Personal information
- Date of birth: 10 December 2005 (age 20)
- Place of birth: Hengelo, Netherlands
- Height: 1.75 m (5 ft 9 in)
- Position: Winger

Team information
- Current team: St Mirren (on loan from Arsenal)
- Number: 19

Youth career
- Chatham Riverside FC
- Sittingbourne Lions FC
- Arsenal

Senior career*
Years	Team	Apps	(Gls)
2024–	Arsenal	0	(0)
2025–2026	→ Shrewsbury Town (loan)	38	(2)
2026–	→ St Mirren (loan)	7	(0)
- * Club domestic league appearances and goals as of 23:22, 19 October 2026 (UTC)

Ismeal Kabia (born 10 December 2005) is a Dutch professional footballer who plays as a winger for Scottish Premiership club St Mirren, on loan from the Premier League club Arsenal.

== Early life ==
Kabia was born on 10 December 2005 in Hengelo, the Netherlands. He is eligible to represent Sierra Leone internationally through his parents. He moved with his family to England at the age of nine. A right-footed player, he mainly operates as a left or right-sided winger.

== Career ==
As a youth player, Kabia spent time at Chatham Riverside and Sittingbourne Lions before joining the youth academy of English side Arsenal. He made his first senior matchday squad during a 1–0 win over rivals Tottenham Hotspur on 15 September 2024. On 25 September, he made his senior debut as a substitute for Raheem Sterling in a 5–1 win over Bolton Wanderers in the EFL Cup.

On 29 August 2025, Kabia joined League Two club Shrewsbury Town on loan until the end of the 2025–26 season.

== Career statistics ==
As of match played 10 September 2026

Appearances and goals by club, season and competition
Club	Season	League			National cup (Note: Includes FA Cup)		League cup (Note: Includes Scottish League Cup)		Continental		Other		Total	
Club	Season	Division	Apps	Goals	Apps	Goals	Apps	Goals	Apps	Goals	Apps	Goals	Apps	Goals
Arsenal U21	2024–25	—			—		—		—		3 (Note: Appearance(s) in EFL Trophy)	1	3	1
Arsenal	2024–25	Premier League	0	0	0	0	1	0	0	0	—		1	0
Arsenal	2025–26	Premier League	0	0	0	0	0	0	0	0	—		0	0
Arsenal	Total		0	0	0	0	1	0	0	0	—		1	0
Shrewsbury Town (loan)	2025–26	League Two	38	2	3	1	0	0	—		2	0	43	3
St Mirren (loan)	2026–27	Scottish Premiership	4	0	0	0	1	0	—		0	0	5	0
Career total			42	2	3	1	2	0	0	0	5	1	52	4
