= Sam Stubbs =

English footballer (born 1998)

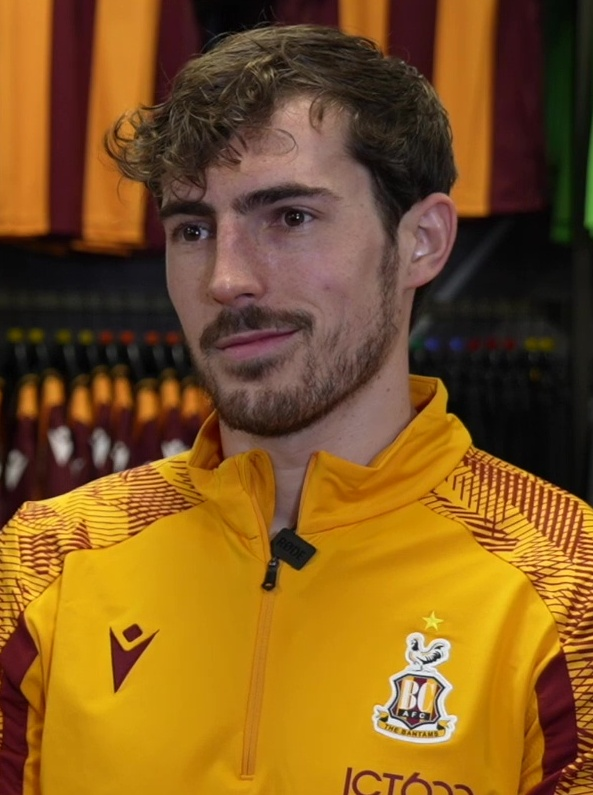

Personal information
- Full name: Samuel Alan Stubbs
- Date of birth: 20 November 1998 (age 27)
- Place of birth: Liverpool, England
- Height: 6 ft 3 in (1.90 m)
- Position: Centre-back

Team information
- Current team: Shrewsbury Town
- Number: 6

Youth career
- –2013: Everton
- 2013–2017: Wigan Athletic

Senior career*
Years	Team	Apps	(Gls)
2017–2018	Wigan Athletic	0	(0)
2017–2018	→ Crewe Alexandra (loan)	5	(0)
2018	→ AFC Fylde (loan)	7	(0)
2018–2020	Middlesbrough	0	(0)
2019	→ Notts County (loan)	17	(0)
2019–2020	→ Hamilton Academical (loan)	19	(0)
2020	→ ADO Den Haag (loan)	8	(0)
2020–2021	Fleetwood Town	5	(1)
2021–2023	Exeter City	24	(2)
2023–2025	Bradford City	45	(1)
2024–2025	→ Cheltenham Town (loan)	41	(2)
2025–	Shrewsbury Town	40	(2)
- * Club domestic league appearances and goals as of 18:53, 2 November 2026 (UTC)

Samuel Alan Stubbs (born 20 November 1998) is an English professional footballer who plays as a centre-back for EFL League Two side Shrewsbury Town.

== Club career ==
=== Wigan Athletic ===
Stubbs joined Wigan Athletic in 2013, after progressing through the Everton youth ranks. On 8 August 2017, Stubbs made his Wigan debut during their EFL Cup tie against Blackpool, which resulted in a 2–1 victory for the Latics.

=== Crewe Alexandra ===
On 29 August 2017, Stubbs joined Crewe Alexandra on a six-month loan deal, and made his League debut at Exeter City on 16 September 2017. At the end of his loan spell in January 2018, Stubbs returned to Wigan, before joining AFC Fylde for a month-long loan.

=== Middlesbrough ===
He was released by Wigan at the end of the 2017–18 season, and subsequently joined Middlesbrough on 1 July 2018. On 31 January 2019, Stubbs joined League Two strugglers Notts County on loan until the end of the season.

In August 2019, he signed on loan for Scottish club Hamilton Academical. Middlesbrough ended the loan in January 2020, with the intention of sending Stubbs to Dutch club ADO Den Haag.

=== Fleetwood Town ===
On 9 September 2020, Stubbs joined League One side Fleetwood Town on a two-year deal. He scored his first goal for Fleetwood in a 4–1 win against Hull City on 9 October 2020.

=== Exeter City ===
On 21 January 2021, Stubbs signed for League Two side Exeter City. He scored his first goals for City on 26 March 2022, a brace in a 2–1 win over Stevenage FC. Stubbs won promotion with Exeter City to EFL League One in the 2021–22 season.

=== Bradford City ===
In January 2023, he signed for Bradford City. Stubbs' first goal for the Bantams came on 15 April 2023, the opener in a 3–0 away victory against Rochdale AFC.

At the end of the 2023–24 season, he triggered a contract extension.

In August 2024, Stubbs joined fellow League Two side Cheltenham Town on a season-long loan.

He was released by Bradford City at the end of the 2024–25 season.

== Personal life ==
Stubbs is the son of former Bolton Wanderers, Celtic and Everton defender Alan Stubbs.

== Career statistics ==
As of match played 31 October 2026

Appearances and goals by club, season and competition
Club	Season	League			FA Cup		EFL Cup		Other		Total	
Club	Season	Division	Apps	Goals	Apps	Goals	Apps	Goals	Apps	Goals	Apps	Goals
Wigan Athletic	2015–16	League One	0	0	0	0	0	0	0	0	0	0
Wigan Athletic	2016–17	Championship	0	0	0	0	0	0	0	0	0	0
Wigan Athletic	2017–18	League One	0	0	0	0	1	0	0	0	1	0
Wigan Athletic	Total		0	0	0	0	1	0	0	0	1	0
Crewe Alexandra (loan)	2017–18	League Two	5	0	1	0	0	0	2 (Note: Appearance(s) in EFL Trophy)	0	8	0
AFC Fylde (loan)	2017–18	National League	7	0	0	0	0	0	0	0	7	0
Middlesbrough	2018–19	Championship	0	0	0	0	0	0	3 (Note: Appearances for Middlesbrough under-23s in EFL Trophy)	0	3	0
Middlesbrough	2019–20	Championship	0	0	0	0	0	0	0	0	0	0
Middlesbrough	Total		0	0	0	0	0	0	3	0	3	0
Notts County (loan)	2018–19	League Two	17	0	0	0	0	0	0	0	17	0
Hamilton Academical (loan)	2019–20	Scottish Premiership	19	0	0	0	1	0	0	0	20	0
ADO Den Haag (loan)	2019–20	Eredivisie	8	0	0	0	0	0	0	0	8	0
Fleetwood Town	2020–21	League One	5	1	0	0	2	0	2	0	9	1
Exeter City	2020–21	League Two	0	0	0	0	0	0	0	0	0	0
Exeter City	2021–22	League Two	22	2	1	0	0	0	2	0	25	2
Exeter City	2022–23	League One	2	0	0	0	2	0	0	0	4	0
Exeter City	Total		24	2	1	0	2	0	2	0	29	2
Bradford City	2022–23	League Two	19	1	0	0	0	0	2 (Note: Appearances in League Two play-offs)	0	21	1
Bradford City	2023–24	League Two	26	0	1	0	3	0	4	1	34	1
Bradford City	2024–25	League Two	0	0	0	0	0	0	0	0	0	0
Bradford City	Total		45	1	1	0	3	0	6	1	55	2
Cheltenham Town (loan)	2024–25	League Two	41	2	2	0	0	0	3	0	46	2
Shrewsbury Town	2025–26	League Two	29	2	2	0	0	0	2	0	33	2
Shrewsbury Town	2026–27	League Two	11	0	0	0	1	0	2	0	14	0
Shrewsbury Town	Total		40	2	2	0	1	0	4	0	47	2
Career total			211	8	7	0	10	0	22	1	250	9

== Honours ==
Exeter City

- EFL League Two runner-up: 2021–22

Individual

- Cheltenham Town Football Club Player Of The Year: 2024-25
