= George Lloyd (footballer, born 2000) =

English footballer (born 2000)

Personal information
- Full name: George Robert Lawrence Lloyd
- Date of birth: 11 February 2000 (age 26)
- Place of birth: Gloucester, England
- Height: 1.72 m (5 ft 8 in)
- Position: Forward

Team information
- Current team: Shrewsbury Town
- Number: 9

Youth career
- 2009–2017: Cheltenham Town

Senior career*
| Years | Team | Apps | (Gls) |
| 2017–2024 | Cheltenham Town | 111 | (8) |
| 2018–2019 | → Hereford (loan) | 12 | (2) |
| 2019 | → Hereford (loan) | 7 | (1) |
| 2021–2022 | → Port Vale (loan) | 7 | (0) |
| 2023 | → Grimsby Town (loan) | 21 | (5) |
| 2024– | Shrewsbury Town | 102 | (14) |
- * Club domestic league appearances and goals as of 23:12, 17 November 2026 (UTC)

George Robert Lawrence Lloyd (born 11 February 2000) is an English professional footballer who plays as a forward for EFL League Two club Shrewsbury Town.

Lloyd made his first-team debut at Cheltenham Town during the 2017–18 season and spent much of the following campaign on loan at Hereford. He played 18 games for Cheltenham in the 2019–20 season before scoring four goals in 40 games as they won promotion as champions of League Two in 2020–21. He joined Port Vale on loan for the 2021–22 season, but the loan was terminated halfway through after he sustained a stomach injury. He was loaned out to Grimsby Town for the second half of the 2022–23 campaign. He signed a permanent deal with Shrewsbury Town in June 2024.

== Career ==
=== Cheltenham Town ===
After progressing through the academy, Lloyd made his first-team debut during Cheltenham Town's EFL Trophy tie against Swansea City U23s at Whaddon Road on 15 August 2017, which resulted in a 2–1 defeat for Cheltenham, with Lloyd featuring for the entire 90 minutes. He scored a club record-equalling eight goals in an FA Youth Cup win over A.F.C. Totton in November. He turned professional at the club in December 2017, when he was also given a League Football Education award, which was given to "highlight the achievements and progression of talented young footballers who apply themselves to all aspects of their apprenticeship". He made his League Two debut on New Year's Day, coming on for Kyle Storer 79 minutes into a 4–1 defeat at Stevenage. Manager Gary Johnson handed him his first start in the English Football League on 7 April, in a 3–0 home win over Morecambe during which Lloyd picked up an assist. He scored his first goal for the "Robins" on 21 April, in a 4–3 defeat at Cambridge United. He scored another goal against Crewe Alexandra to end the 2017–18 season with two goals from eight appearances.

On 9 October 2018, Lloyd joined National League North side Hereford on a three-month loan, who were managed by former Cheltenham Town player Marc Richards. He scored his first goal for the "Bulls" during their 3–1 defeat to Boston United on 27 October. Lloyd was recalled by Cheltenham on 4 January, however, was loaned back out to Hereford for the remainder of the 2018–19 season on 17 January. He scored four goals from 20 games during his time at Edgar Street before being recalled to Cheltenham for a second time on 19 February. On 13 April, he scored an equalising goal against Lincoln City, which was later voted as 'Goal of the Season' by the club's supporters. Speaking the following month, he said that "working under [manager] Michael Duff has been great for me... as someone who has come through the youth system like me here at Cheltenham I look up to him a huge amount and am looking forward to having another season working and learning from him again".

Lloyd made 18 appearances across the course of the 2019–20 campaign, scoring once in the EFL Trophy. He scored four goals from 40 games in the 2020–21 campaign as Cheltenham secured promotion into League One as champions of League Two; he started 18 league games and made 14 substitute appearances in the league. One of his goals helped to secure a 2–1 victory over Crewe Alexandra in the second round of the FA Cup, with his header earning him plaudits from Duff for his bravery.

On 30 August 2021, Lloyd joined League Two side Port Vale on a season-long loan deal after playing six times for Cheltenham earlier in the month. Manager Darrell Clarke said: "he's a striker that optimises what I want in my centre-forwards, he works hard, he's a grafter". Limited to only one league start and five substitute appearances in his first two months with the "Valiants", assistant manager Andy Crosby nevertheless stated that "George impressed us from the day he walked into the football club with his enthusiasm, his endeavour and his willingness to run, chase, harry and upset defenders". He scored his first goal for the club in a 5–1 victory over Accrington Stanley in an FA Cup first round match on 6 November. However, he was sidelined with a stomach injury at the end of the month and was prescribed three months of complete rest in order to recover. On 13 January 2022, his loan was terminated and he returned to Cheltenham Town. He started three games and made five substitute appearances for Cheltenham in the second half of the 2021–22 season, scoring a goal against AFC Wimbledon upon his return to fitness.

He made 13 League One appearances in the first half of the 2022–23 season, including six starts under new head coach Wade Elliott, though struggled to find regular gametime due to the form of Alfie May and Dan Nlundulu. On 31 January 2023, Lloyd joined League Two side Grimsby Town on loan for the remainder of the 2022–23 season as manager Paul Hurst looked to add options to his front line. He scored on his debut four days later in a 3–0 win away at Crewe Alexandra. He finished the loan spell with five goals and four assists in 21 games. He proved to be a popular player with fans at Blundell Park. However, Hurst admitted it was unlikely that Cheltenham would allow him to return to Grimsby the following season.

He scored both Cheltenham's goals in a 2–0 win over Shrewsbury Town on Boxing Day 2023. Assistant manager Adam Murray described him as "unplayable". Lloyd was voted as the club's Player of the Month for December. He was offered a new contract by manager Darrell Clarke despite Cheltenham being relegated at the end of the 2023–24 season, though was expected to depart after reported interest from other clubs.

=== Shrewsbury Town ===
On 7 June 2024, Lloyd signed a two-year contract with League One club Shrewsbury Town. He said he was excited to work with management duo Paul Hurst and Chris Doig, whom he described as "fundamentally honest people". The club rejected two six-figure bids in the January transfer window. He was subsequently praised for his work ethic by manager Gareth Ainsworth. He scored five goals in 49 appearances throughout the 2024–25 campaign, which culminated in relegation down to League Two.

Manager Michael Appleton said that Lloyd and John Marquis could be relied upon to provide the goals in League Two. On 29 November, Lloyd scored a brace in one of the best performances of his career, in a 3–3 draw with Gillingham. Appleton said in December that he was open to the idea of playing Lloyd at wing-back following a series of injuries in the position. The club had struggled for form, though Lloyd said "I don't feel we're a million miles away" from rising up the table and that personally he needed to "add a bit of selfishness" to his game. He scored four goals in 47 games in the 2025–26 season.

== Style of play ==
Lloyd is a brave and hard-working forward who can also play wide on the right or as an advanced midfielder. Writing in January 2023, Gloucestershire Live reporter Jon Palmer described him as a "genuine all-rounder" due to his athleticism, heading skills and pace.

== Career statistics ==
As of match played 14 November 2026

Appearances and goals by club, season and competition
| Club | Season | League | | | FA Cup | | League Cup | | Other | | Total | |
| Club | Season | Division | Apps | Goals | Apps | Goals | Apps | Goals | Apps | Goals | Apps | Goals |
|---|---|---|---|---|---|---|---|---|---|---|---|---|
| Cheltenham Town | 2017–18 | League Two | 7 | 2 | 0 | 0 | 0 | 0 | 1 (Note: Appearance(s) in EFL Trophy) | 0 | 8 | 2 |
| Cheltenham Town | 2018–19 | League Two | 7 | 1 | 0 | 0 | 2 | 0 | 0 | 0 | 9 | 1 |
| Cheltenham Town | 2019–20 | League Two | 13 | 0 | 1 | 0 | 1 | 0 | 3 | 1 | 18 | 1 |
| Cheltenham Town | 2020–21 | League Two | 32 | 2 | 3 | 1 | 1 | 0 | 4 | 1 | 40 | 4 |
| Cheltenham Town | 2021–22 | League One | 12 | 1 | 0 | 0 | 2 | 0 | 0 | 0 | 14 | 1 |
| Cheltenham Town | 2022–23 | League One | 13 | 0 | 1 | 0 | 1 | 0 | 3 | 0 | 18 | 0 |
| Cheltenham Town | 2023–24 | League One | 27 | 2 | 1 | 0 | 0 | 0 | 1 | 0 | 29 | 2 |
| Cheltenham Town | Total | | 111 | 8 | 6 | 1 | 7 | 0 | 12 | 2 | 136 | 11 |
| Hereford (loan) | 2018–19 | National League North | 19 | 3 | 0 | 0 | — | | 1 (Note: Appearance(s) in FA Trophy) | 1 | 20 | 4 |
| Port Vale (loan) | 2021–22 | League Two | 7 | 0 | 1 | 1 | — | | 3 | 1 | 11 | 2 |
| Grimsby Town (loan) | 2022–23 | League Two | 21 | 5 | — | | — | | — | | 21 | 5 |
| Shrewsbury Town | 2024–25 | League One | 44 | 5 | 1 | 0 | 2 | 0 | 2 | 0 | 49 | 5 |
| Shrewsbury Town | 2025–26 | League Two | 43 | 4 | 2 | 0 | 1 | 0 | 1 | 0 | 47 | 4 |
| Shrewsbury Town | 2026–27 | League Two | 15 | 5 | 1 | 1 | 2 | 0 | 1 | 0 | 19 | 6 |
| Shrewsbury Town | Total | | 102 | 14 | 4 | 1 | 5 | 0 | 4 | 0 | 115 | 15 |
| Career total | | | 260 | 30 | 11 | 3 | 12 | 0 | 20 | 4 | 303 | 37 |

== Honours ==
Cheltenham Town

- EFL League Two: 2020–21
