= Michael Golding (footballer) =

English footballer (born 2006)

Personal information
- Full name: Michael Heinz Golding
- Date of birth: 23 May 2006 (age 20)
- Place of birth: Kingston upon Thames, England
- Height: 1.78 m (5 ft 10 in)
- Position: Midfielder

Team information
- Current team: Shrewsbury Town (on loan from Leicester City)
- Number: 20

Youth career
- –2018: AFC Wimbledon
- 2018–2024: Chelsea

Senior career*
Years	Team	Apps	(Gls)
2024	Chelsea	0	(0)
2024–	Leicester City	1	(0)
2026–	→ Shrewsbury Town (loan)	1	(0)

International career^{‡}
2021	Republic of Ireland U16	2	(1)
2021–2022	England U16	11	(1)
2022–2023	England U17	19	(4)
2023–2024	England U18	8	(1)
2024	England U19	2	(0)
- * Club domestic league appearances and goals as of 20:51, 1 September 2026 (UTC) ‡ National team caps and goals as of 22:16, 7 September 2024 (UTC)

Michael Heinz Golding (born 23 May 2006) is an English professional footballer who plays as a midfielder for EFL League Two club Shrewsbury Town, on loan from EFL League One club Leicester City.

== Club career ==
Born in Kingston, Golding started his career at the academy of AFC Wimbledon, before joining Chelsea in 2018. He signed his first professional contract in July 2023. Golding started training with the first team squad in 2023–24 season. On 6 January 2024, he made his first team debut against Preston North End at Stamford Bridge in the FA Cup.

On 7 July 2024, Golding signed for Leicester City.

On 28 August 2026, Golding signed for EFL League Two club Shrewsbury Town on a season-long loan.

== International career ==
In September 2021, Golding made two appearances for the Republic of Ireland under-16 team, both in friendly matches against Malta, scoring in a 6–0 win on 23 September 2021.

Golding had represented England at under-16, under-17 and under-18 level. He had captained England at the 2023 UEFA European Under-17 Championship. Golding is also eligible to represent Republic of Ireland through his family.

On 2 November 2023, Golding was included in the England squad for the 2023 FIFA U-17 World Cup.

== Personal life ==
Golding is the brother of fellow professional footballer James Golding and scholar Aidan Golding.

== Honours ==
England U18s

- 2024 U18 Pinatar Super Cup

== Career statistics ==
As of match played 27 October 2026

Appearances and goals by club, season and competition
Club	Season	League			FA Cup		EFL Cup		Other		Total	
Club	Season	Division	Apps	Goals	Apps	Goals	Apps	Goals	Apps	Goals	Apps	Goals
Chelsea U21	2022–23	—			—		—		1 (Note: Appearance in EFL Trophy)	0	1	0
Chelsea U21	2023–24	—			—		—		1	1	1	1
Chelsea U21	Total		0	0	0	0	0	0	2	1	2	1
Chelsea	2023–24	Premier League	0	0	1	0	0	0	—		1	0
Leicester City	2024–25	Premier League	1	0	0	0	0	0	—		1	0
Leicester City	2025–26	Championship	0	0	0	0	0	0	—		0	0
Shrewsbury Town (loan)	2026–27	League Two	5	0	0	0	—		2	1	7	1
Career total			6	0	1	0	0	0	4	2	11	2
