= Jay Turner-Cooke =

English footballer (born 2003)

Personal information
- Full name: Jay Turner-Cooke
- Date of birth: 31 December 2003 (age 22)
- Place of birth: South Shields, England
- Height: 1.79 m (5 ft 10 in)
- Position: Midfielder

Team information
- Current team: Shrewsbury Town
- Number: 7

Youth career
- –2021: Sunderland
- 2021–2023: Newcastle United

Senior career*
Years	Team	Apps	(Gls)
2023–2025	Newcastle United	0	(0)
2023	→ Tranmere Rovers (loan)	12	(0)
2023–2024	→ St Johnstone (loan)	6	(0)
2025–2026	FC Halifax Town	37	(4)
2026–	Shrewsbury Town	12	(0)
- * Club domestic league appearances and goals as of 13:52, 22 November 2026 (UTC)

Jay Turner-Cooke (born 31 December 2003) is an English professional footballer who plays as a midfielder for EFL League Two club Shrewsbury Town.

== Career ==
Turner-Cooke began his career with Sunderland, moving to Newcastle United in January 2021. He spent time training with the Newcastle first-team.

Turner-Cooke moved on loan to Tranmere Rovers in January 2023. He also signed a new contract with Newcastle.

On 24 August 2023, Turner-Cooke joined Scottish Premiership club St Johnstone on a season-long loan.

He was released by Newcastle at the end of the 2024–25 season.

In August 2025 he signed for FC Halifax Town.

On 4 July 2026, he signed for EFL League Two club Shrewsbury Town.

== Career statistics ==
As of match played 21 November 2026

Appearances and goals by club, season and competition
Club	Season	League			National cup		League cup		Other		Total	
Club	Season	Division	Apps	Goals	Apps	Goals	Apps	Goals	Apps	Goals	Apps	Goals
Newcastle United	2022–23	Premier League	0	0	0	0	0	0	—		0	0
Newcastle United	2023–24	Premier League	0	0	0	0	0	0	—		0	0
Newcastle United	2024–25	Premier League	0	0	0	0	0	0	—		0	0
Newcastle United	Total		0	0	0	0	0	0	0	0	0	0
Tranmere Rovers (loan)	2022–23	League Two	12	0	0	0	0	0	0	0	12	0
St Johnstone (loan)	2023–24	Scottish Premiership	6	0	0	0	0	0	—		6	0
FC Halifax Town	2025–26	National League	37	4	1	0	0	0	1 (Note: Appearance in FA Trophy)	1	39	5
Shrewsbury Town	2026–27	League Two	12	0	1	0	2	0	1 (Note: Appearance in EFL Trophy)	0	16	0
Career total			67	4	2	0	2	0	2	1	73	5

== Personal life ==
His father is former player John Cooke, who was later Sunderland's kit man.
