= Kevin Berkoe =

English footballer

Personal information
- Full name: Kevin Nana Yaw Berkoe
- Date of birth: 5 July 2001 (age 25)
- Height: 1.78 m (5 ft 10 in)
- Position: Defender

Team information
- Current team: Shrewsbury Town
- Number: 11

Youth career
- Chelsea
- 2017–2019: Wolverhampton Wanderers

Senior career*
Years	Team	Apps	(Gls)
2019–2020	Oxford United	0	(0)
2019–2020	→ Oxford City (loan)	17	(2)
2020–2026	Salford City	32	(1)
2021	→ AFC Telford United (loan)	8	(0)
2022	→ Altrincham (loan)	3	(0)
2023	→ Maidstone United (loan)	10	(0)
2024	→ Woking (loan)	8	(3)
2025	→ Rochdale (loan)	9	(0)
2026–	Shrewsbury Town	34	(2)
- * Club domestic league appearances and goals as of 13:53, 22 November 2026 (UTC)

Kevin Nana Yaw Berkoe (born 5 July 2001) is an English professional footballer who plays as a defender for Shrewsbury Town.

Berkoe began his career in the youth academies of Chelsea and Wolverhampton Wanderers, before making his professional debut for Oxford United in 2019. He had a loan spell with non-league club Oxford City during the same season, and in 2020 joined Salford City following his release. At Salford he spent loan spells at non-league clubs AFC Telford United, Altrincham and Maidstone United. He joined Woking on loan in March 2024.

== Career ==
After playing for Chelsea and Wolverhampton Wanderers as a youth, and having a trial with Sunderland in March 2019, he signed for Oxford United in May of the same year. Upon signing for the club, Oxford manager Karl Robinson described him as "quick, technically very good", and said it was encouraging to have competition for his position. Berkoe made his Oxford debut as a substitute in an EFL Cup first-round tie against Peterborough United on 13 August, and said he was "honoured" to make the step-up to first-team football. On 22 November, Berkoe joined Oxford City on a 28-day loan. On 17 December, he scored his first goal for the club, putting his team 3–2 ahead in an eventual 3–3 draw with bottom of the table St Albans City. and the following week the loan was extended until the end of January 2020. In January 2020, it was extended for a further month.

He was released by Oxford United at the end of the 2019–20 season. He signed with Salford City for the 2020–21 season. On 10 November, Berkoe made his début for Salford in an EFL Trophy group stage match against Rochdale. On 25 September 2021, he moved on loan to National League North team AFC Telford United for one month. Due to several defensive injuries and suspensions, he made his debut the same day, with local newspaper Shropshire Star describing him as one of Telford's "few successes" in a 2–0 defeat to Brackley Town, putting in a "fine display". He was recalled by Salford City on 12 November 2021.

In January 2022 he joined Altrincham on loan for a month. He moved on loan to Maidstone United in March 2023. On 8 March 2024, Berkoe joined Woking on loan for the remainder of the season.

In July 2024, Berkoe signed a new two-year contract with Salford City.

In September 2025, he joined National League side Rochdale on a loan deal that would initially last until the following January.

He signed for Shrewsbury Town in February 2026.

== Career statistics ==
As of match played on 21 November 2026

Appearances and goals by club, season and competition
Club	Season	League			FA Cup		League Cup		Other		Total	
Club	Season	Division	Apps	Goals	Apps	Goals	Apps	Goals	Apps	Goals	Apps	Goals
Oxford United	2019–20	League One	0	0	0	0	2	0	1 (Note: Appearance(s) in the EFL Trophy)	0	3	0
Oxford City (loan)	2019–20	National League South	17	2	0	0	—		2 (Note: Appearances in FA Trophy)	0	19	2
Salford City	2020–21	League Two	0	0	1	0	0	0	2	0	3	0
Salford City	2021–22	League Two	0	0	0	0	0	0	0	0	0	0
Salford City	2022–23	League Two	4	0	1	0	1	0	3	1	9	1
Salford City	2023–24	League Two	7	1	0	0	1	0	1	0	9	1
Salford City	2024–25	League Two	15	0	2	0	0	0	1	0	18	0
Salford City	2025–26	League Two	6	0	1	0	0	0	2	0	9	0
Salford City	Total		32	1	5	0	2	0	9	1	48	2
AFC Telford United (loan)	2021–22	National League North	8	0	0	0	—		0	0	8	0
Altrincham (loan)	2021–22	National League	3	0	0	0	—		0	0	3	0
Maidstone United (loan)	2022–23	National League	10	0	0	0	—		0	0	10	0
Woking (loan)	2023–24	National League	8	3	0	0	—		0	0	8	3
Rochdale (loan)	2025–26	National League	9	0	0	0	—		0	0	9	0
Shrewsbury Town	2025–26	League Two	18	0	0	0	0	0	0	0	18	0
Shrewsbury Town	2026–27	League Two	16	2	1	0	2	0	0	0	19	2
Shrewsbury Town	Total		34	2	1	0	2	0	0	0	37	2
Career total			121	8	6	0	6	0	12	1	145	9
