= Isaac Fletcher (footballer) =

English footballer

Personal information
- Full name: Isaac Andrew Fletcher
- Date of birth: 1 June 2002 (age 24)
- Height: 6 ft 4 in (1.93 m)
- Position: Midfielder

Team information
- Current team: Shrewsbury Town
- Number: 8

Youth career
- 2012–2020: Middlesbrough

Senior career*
Years	Team	Apps	(Gls)
2020–2023	Middlesbrough	0	(0)
2022	→ Hartlepool United (loan)	14	(1)
2022	→ Scunthorpe United (loan)	3	(0)
2024–2025	Spennymoor Town	33	(11)
2025–2026	Barrow	42	(8)
2026–	Shrewsbury Town	12	(1)
- * Club domestic league appearances and goals as of 13:53, 22 November 2026 (UTC)

Isaac Andrew Fletcher (born 1 June 2002) is an English professional footballer who plays as a midfielder for Shrewsbury Town.

== Career ==
Fletcher began his career with Middlesbrough at under-10 level before turning professional in November 2020. He moved on loan to Hartlepool United in January 2022. In February 2022, Fletcher scored his first professional goal in a 2–1 win at Colchester United.

On 26 August 2022, Fletcher signed for National League club Scunthorpe United on loan until January 2023, however he was recalled early, on 28 September 2022.

He was released by Middlesbrough at the end of 2023 and in February 2024, it was announced Fletcher had signed for National League North side Spennymoor Town. Fletcher started the 2024–25 season brightly, scoring his tenth goal in all competitions on 5 October 2024 in a 1–1 draw against Kidderminster Harriers.

On 2 January 2025, Fletcher signed for League Two side Barrow on a two-and-a-half year deal for an undisclosed fee.

On 15 June 2026, Fletcher returned to League Two following Barrow's relegation, signing for Shrewsbury Town on a two-year deal for an undisclosed fee.

== Personal life ==
His father Andy played semi-professionally for Spennymoor. Isaac is also the older brother of Oscar Fletcher who played for Hartlepool's youth team.

== Honours ==
Individual

- National League Player of the Month: September 2024

== Career statistics ==
As of match played 21 November 2026

Appearances and goals by club, season and competition
Club	Season	League			FA Cup		League Cup		Other		Total	
Club	Season	Division	Apps	Goals	Apps	Goals	Apps	Goals	Apps	Goals	Apps	Goals
Middlesbrough	2020–21	Championship	0 (Note: Soccerbase has wrongly attributed a league appearance to Isaac Fletcher. It was Ashley Fletcher who started in Middlesbrough's 2-1 win against Huddersfield in February 2021 - not Isaac. See BBC and Soccerway.)	0	0	0	0	0	0	0	0	0
Middlesbrough	2021–22	Championship	0	0	0	0	0	0	0	0	0	0
Middlesbrough	2022–23	Championship	0	0	0	0	1	0	0	0	1	0
Middlesbrough	Total		0	0	0	0	1	0	0	0	1	0
Hartlepool United (loan)	2021–22	League Two	14	1	1	0	0	0	0	0	15	1
Scunthorpe United (loan)	2022–23	National League	3	0	0	0	—		0	0	3	0
Spennymoor Town	2023–24	National League North	11	0	0	0	—		0	0	11	0
Spennymoor Town	2024–25	National League North	22	11	3	2	—		1 (Note: Appearance(s) in FA Trophy)	0	26	13
Spennymoor Town	Total		33	11	3	2	0	0	1	0	37	13
Barrow	2024–25	League Two	11	1	0	0	0	0	0	0	11	1
Barrow	2025–26	League Two	31	7	2	0	0	0	2	0	35	7
Barrow	Total		42	8	2	0	0	0	2	0	46	8
Shrewsbury Town	2026–27	League Two	12	1	1	1	2	0	3 (Note: Appearances in the EFL Trophy)	0	18	2
Career total			104	21	7	3	3	0	6	0	120	24
