= Will Boyle =

English footballer (born 1995)

Personal information
- Full name: William Sam Douglas Harry Boyle
- Date of birth: 1 September 1995 (age 31)
- Place of birth: Garforth, England
- Height: 6 ft 3 in (1.91 m)
- Position: Centre back

Team information
- Current team: Shrewsbury Town
- Number: 5

Youth career
- –2010: Garforth Villa
- 2010–2015: Huddersfield Town

Senior career*
Years	Team	Apps	(Gls)
2015–2017	Huddersfield Town	2	(0)
2015	→ Kidderminster Harriers (loan)	2	(0)
2015	→ Macclesfield Town (loan)	0	(0)
2015–2016	→ York City (loan)	6	(0)
2016	→ York City (loan)	6	(0)
2016–2017	→ Kilmarnock (loan)	11	(0)
2017–2022	Cheltenham Town	166	(23)
2022–2023	Huddersfield Town	16	(0)
2023–2025	Wrexham	24	(3)
2025–	Shrewsbury Town	45	(4)
- * Club domestic league appearances and goals as of 14:31, 26 August 2026 (UTC)

William Sam Douglas Harry Boyle (born 1 September 1995) is an English professional footballer who plays as a centre back for EFL League Two club Shrewsbury Town.

== Early life and club career ==
=== Huddersfield Town ===
William Sam Douglas Harry Boyle was born on 1 September 1995 in Garforth, West Yorkshire. He attended Garforth Community College (now Garforth Academy) before joining Huddersfield Town's academy at under-15 level from his local club Garforth Villa in October 2010. With a youth stint at Sheffield Wednesdays Academy. He was nearly ever-present for the under-18 team in the 2012–13 season. He made his first-team debut for Huddersfield as a late substitute in the 3–0 win against Reading on 24 February 2015.

On 26 March 2015, he joined Conference Premier (now National League) club Kidderminster Harriers on loan for the rest of the 2014–15 season, and made two appearances for the club. On 5 August, he joined National League club Macclesfield Town on loan for two months.

On 18 November 2015, Boyle joined League Two club York City on a youth loan until 3 January 2016. He made his debut on 21 November 2015 when starting York's 3–2 away to Leyton Orient, in which he struggled to cope with the physicality of opponent striker Ollie Palmer. He struck up a partnership at centre-back with Dave Winfield, and despite York wanting to extend his loan Boyle returned to Huddersfield in January 2016. Having made only one appearance as a late substitute after returning to Huddersfield, he rejoined York on loan until the end of the 2015–16 season on 26 February 2016.

In June 2016, Boyle joined Scottish Premiership club Kilmarnock on a six-month loan. He scored on his debut, as Kilmarnock beat Clyde 2–1 in the Scottish League Cup on 16 July 2016. The goal came after he had earlier conceded a penalty, which was saved by Kilmarnock goalkeeper Jamie MacDonald. Boyle returned to Huddersfield in January 2017, having made 14 appearances and scored 1 goal for Kilmarnock.

=== Cheltenham Town ===
Boyle signed for League Two club Cheltenham Town on 9 January 2017 on a one-and-a-half-year contract. He made his debut in a 3–0 home victory over Accrington Stanley on 14 January 2017. In April 2018, he signed a new contract to keep him at the club until June 2020.

Boyle signed a new two-year contract at Cheltenham in May 2020. Following an impressive 2020–21 season, Boyle was named in the League Two Team of the Season and the PFA Team of the Year for League Two.

=== Huddersfield Town return and Wrexham ===
On 6 June 2022, Boyle agreed to return to Championship club Huddersfield Town on a free transfer. He signed a two-year contract, effective from 1 July upon the expiration of his contract with Cheltenham.

Boyle signed for newly promoted League Two club Wrexham on 13 July 2023 on a three-year contract. He made his debut on 12 August when starting Wrexham's 1–1 draw away to AFC Wimbledon before scoring his first goal three days with a header in a 4–2 home win over Walsall.

=== Shrewsbury ===
On 26 June 2025, Shrewsbury announced they had signed Boyle on a two-year deal.

== International career ==
Boyle's father is Scottish, and he attended a training camp for the Scotland national under-18 team in October 2012.

== Career statistics ==
As of match played 24 February 2026

Appearances and goals by club, season and competition
Club	Season	League			National Cup (Note: Includes FA Cup)		League Cup (Note: Includes Scottish League Cup, EFL Cup)		Other		Total	
Club	Season	Division	Apps	Goals	Apps	Goals	Apps	Goals	Apps	Goals	Apps	Goals
Huddersfield Town	2014–15	Championship	1	0	0	0	0	0	—		1	0
Huddersfield Town	2015–16	Championship	1	0	0	0	0	0	—		1	0
Huddersfield Town	2016–17	Championship	0	0	0	0	—		—		0	0
Huddersfield Town	Total		2	0	0	0	0	0	—		2	0
Kidderminster Harriers (loan)	2014–15	Conference Premier	2	0	—		—		—		2	0
Macclesfield Town (loan)	2015–16	National League	0	0	—		—		—		0	0
York City (loan)	2015–16	League Two	12	0	—		—		—		12	0
Kilmarnock (loan)	2016–17	Scottish Premiership	11	0	—		3	1	—		14	1
Cheltenham Town	2016–17	League Two	21	2	—		—		2 (Note: Appearances in EFL Trophy)	0	23	2
Cheltenham Town	2017–18	League Two	34	5	1	0	2	0	3	0	40	5
Cheltenham Town	2018–19	League Two	38	4	1	0	2	0	4	2	45	6
Cheltenham Town	2019–20	League Two	13	2	2	0	0	0	4 (Note: Two appearances in EFL Trophy, two in League Two play-offs)	0	19	2
Cheltenham Town	2020–21	League Two	29	6	4	1	2	0	1	0	36	7
Cheltenham Town	2021–22	League One	31	4	0	0	2	0	0	0	33	4
Cheltenham Town	Total		166	23	8	1	8	0	14	2	196	26
Huddersfield Town	2022–23	Championship	16	0	1	0	1	0	—		18	0
Wrexham	2023–24	League Two	24	3	0	0	1	1	3	0	28	4
Wrexham	2024–25	League One	0	0	0	0	1	1	3	1	4	2
Wrexham	Total		24	3	0	0	2	2	6	1	32	6
Shrewsbury Town	2025–26	League Two	33	3	3	0	0	0	2	1	38	4
Career total			266	29	12	1	14	3	22	4	314	37

== Honours ==
Cheltenham Town

- EFL League Two: 2020–21

Wrexham

- EFL League Two runner-up: 2023–24
- EFL League One runner up: 2024-25

Individual

- EFL League Two Team of the Season: 2020–21
- PFA Team of the Year: 2020–21 League Two
