= Luca Hoole =

Welsh footballer

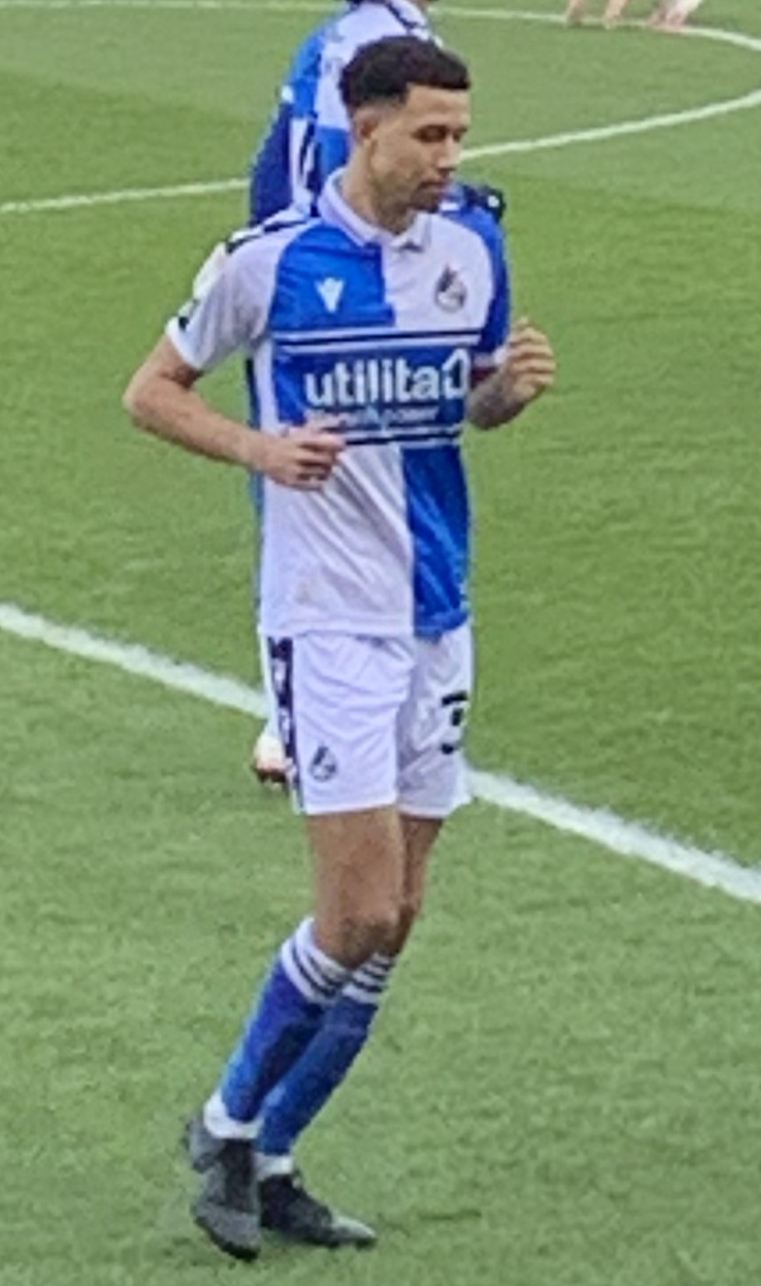
- Hoole playing for Bristol Rovers in 2022.

Personal information
- Full name: Luca Anthony Hoole
- Date of birth: 2 June 2002 (age 24)
- Place of birth: Newport, Wales
- Height: 1.78 m (5 ft 10 in)
- Positions: Full-back; centre-back

Team information
- Current team: Shrewsbury Town
- Number: 2

Youth career
- 2014–2019: Bristol Rovers

Senior career*
Years	Team	Apps	(Gls)
2019–2024	Bristol Rovers	89	(3)
2020	→ Taunton Town (loan)	0	(0)
2024–	Shrewsbury Town	70	(4)

International career^{‡}
2019	Wales U19	1	(0)
2020	Wales U20	1	(0)
2022–2024	Wales U21	12	(1)
- * Club domestic league appearances and goals as of 18:36, 21 February 2026 (UTC) ‡ National team caps and goals as of 10:10, 15 October 2024 (UTC)

Luca Anthony Hoole (born 2 June 2002) is a Welsh professional footballer who plays as a full-back or centre-back for EFL League Two club Shrewsbury Town. He is a Wales under-21 international.

== Club career ==
=== Bristol Rovers ===
Hoole attended Ysgol Gyfun Gwynllyw, a Welsh language school in Pontypool. In 2014, Hoole joined the Bristol Rovers academy. In April 2018, Bristol Rovers confirmed Hoole had signed a scholarship with the club. On 3 September 2019, Hoole made his debut for Bristol Rovers in a 1–1 EFL Trophy draw against Plymouth Argyle.

==== Taunton Town (loan) ====
On 30 October 2020, Hoole joined Taunton Town on a one-month loan deal. Taunton played one match, a match that Hoole was not registered in time to feature in, before football was suspended on account of the lockdown measures brought in for COVID-19.

==== Breakthrough at Bristol Rovers ====
After impressing for the club in pre-season, Hoole made his league debut on the opening day of the 2021–22 season, impressing in the right-back position during a 2–1 away defeat to Mansfield Town. On 29 January 2022, Hoole received a first sending off of his career as he received two bookings in the space of five first-half minutes as ten-man Rovers scored a last-minute winner to defeat Walsall. In February 2022, Hoole signed a new two-year extension to his contract. Following a 4–0 thrashing of Stevenage, Rovers' manager Joey Barton said that Hoole had made the right-back position his own having dipped in and out of the team earlier in the season. On 26 February 2022, Hoole scored a first senior goal with the opener in a 1–1 draw with Exeter City. Hoole's first senior season ended with Rovers overtaking Northampton Town on the final day of the season to gain automatic promotion by goals scored, a dramatic 7–0 victory over Scunthorpe United securing this feat.

Ahead of the 2022–23 season, Hoole featured for the club in pre-season in a less familiar centre-back role, impressing as Rovers defeated Championship side Stoke City. For the first match of the new season, Hoole continued in this role with defensive partner James Connolly as Rovers fell to a late 2–1 defeat against Forest Green Rovers. As the season developed, he began to find himself out of favour at the club and suffered from low confidence, however an impressive return to the first-team in December leading manager Barton to claim that he could one day captain the side. His improvement in form continued into the second half of the season despite a rocky time for the team, impressing in a 3–0 victory over Oxford United that saw the team claim a first victory in seven weeks, Hoole scoring the third goal.

Hoole was offered a new contract at the end of the 2023–24 season. Following the start of pre-season, manager Matt Taylor confirmed that with Hoole still yet to return to the club, they had moved on from expecting him to sign the contract and were instead focusing on how much compensation the club could recoup.

=== Shrewsbury Town ===
On 16 July 2024, Hoole signed a two-year contract with fellow League One club Shrewsbury Town after a compensation package was agreed between the two clubs. Following the transfer, he claimed the desire of a new challenge to be key in his reasoning behind the switch.

Hoole was named both Supporters' Player of the Year and Players' Player of the Year for the 2025–26 season at the club's End of Season Awards. On 8 June 2026, he signed a new two-year deal with the club.

== International career ==
On 13 November 2019, Hoole made his debut for Wales under-19's in a 3–0 win against Poland U19.

In May 2022, Hoole was called up to the Wales U21 team for the first time for the final 2023 U21 European Championship qualifiers against the Netherlands and Gibraltar. Hoole made his debut in the second of the two matches, coming off of the bench with fifteen minutes left as Wales finished their campaign with a 2–0 win.

== Career statistics ==
As of end of 2023–24 season

Appearances and goals by club, season and competition
Club	Season	League			FA Cup		League Cup		Other		Total	
Club	Season	Division	Apps	Goals	Apps	Goals	Apps	Goals	Apps	Goals	Apps	Goals
Bristol Rovers	2019–20	League One	0	0	0	0	0	0	1 (Note: Appearance(s) in the Football League Trophy)	0	1	0
Bristol Rovers	2020–21	League One	0	0	0	0	0	0	0	0	0	0
Bristol Rovers	2021–22	League Two	29	1	2	0	0	0	1	0	32	1
Bristol Rovers	2022–23	League One	37	2	0	0	1	0	6	1	44	3
Bristol Rovers	2023–24	League One	23	0	0	0	1	0	1	0	25	0
Career total			89	3	2	0	2	0	9	1	102	4

== Honours ==
Individual

- Shrewsbury Town Player of the Year: 2025–26
