= Josh Davison =

English footballer (born 1999)

Personal information
- Full name: Joshua Michael Blainey Davison
- Date of birth: 16 September 1999 (age 27)
- Place of birth: Enfield, England
- Height: 6 ft 2 in (1.88 m)
- Position: Forward

Team information
- Current team: Shrewsbury Town
- Number: 13

Youth career
- –2017: Peterborough United

Senior career*
Years	Team	Apps	(Gls)
2017–2018	Peterborough United	0	(0)
2017	→ St Neots Town (loan)	1	(0)
2018	→ Wisbech Town (loan)	5	(3)
2018–2019	Enfield Town	21	(16)
2018	→ Barking (loan)	5	(1)
2019–2022	Charlton Athletic	24	(3)
2020–2021	→ Woking (loan)	11	(3)
2021	→ Forest Green Rovers (loan)	20	(3)
2022	→ Swindon Town (loan)	21	(9)
2022–2024	AFC Wimbledon	73	(13)
2024–2026	Tranmere Rovers	56	(5)
2026	→ Cheltenham Town (loan)	16	(1)
2026–	Shrewsbury Town	11	(3)
- * Club domestic league appearances and goals as of 22:10, 20 October 2026 (UTC)

Joshua Michael Blainey Davison (born 16 September 1999) is an English professional footballer who plays as a forward for EFL League Two club Shrewsbury Town.

== Club career ==
Davison began his career with Peterborough United and enjoyed loan spells at both St Neots Town and Wisbech Town, before making a permanent move to Isthmian League side, Enfield Town ahead of the 2018–19 campaign. He made his debut during Enfield's 2–1 victory in the Alan Turvey Trophy, against Ware in September 2018. Following a brief loan spell with Barking, Davison returned to the club and went on to score his first goals for the club during a 4–1 victory over Burgess Hill Town in the Alan Turvey Trophy, netting a 76-minute hat-trick. Davison then went on to net three more times for the club before leaving Enfield in June 2019.

On 18 October 2019, following a trial period with the under-23s, Davison sealed a move to Championship side Charlton Athletic until the end of the season and made his first-team debut during a 2–2 draw with West Bromwich Albion, just a week after signing for the Addicks.

On 24 October 2020, Davison joined Woking until January 2021. On 13 January 2021, it was reported that Davison's loan had expired at Woking and he had returned to Charlton Athletic with the view to a loan move to a League Two club. Six days later, he joined Forest Green Rovers on loan until the end of the season.

On 24 January 2022, Davison joined Swindon Town on loan for the rest of the 2021–22 season.

On 18 July 2022, Davison joined AFC Wimbledon on a permanent deal. He scored his first goals for Wimbledon when he scored twice in a 5–2 defeat to Mansfield Town on 16 August 2022.

On 19 June 2024, Davison joined League Two side Tranmere Rovers on a 2-year permanent deal.

On 27 January 2026, he joined fellow League Two side Cheltenham Town on loan for the remainder of the season. On 12 May 2026, Tranmere announced he would be leaving in the summer once his contract expired.

On 26 June 2026, Davison agreed to join League Two club Shrewsbury Town on a two-year deal.

== Career statistics ==
As of match played 20 October 2026

Appearances and goals by club, season and competition
Club	Season	League			FA Cup		League Cup		Other		Total	
Club	Season	Division	Apps	Goals	Apps	Goals	Apps	Goals	Apps	Goals	Apps	Goals
Peterborough United	2017–18	League One	0	0	0	0	0	0	0	0	0	0
St Neots Town (loan)	2017–18	Southern League; Premier Division	1	0	0	0	—		1 (Note: Appearance in Southern League Cup)	0	2	0
Wisbech Town (loan)	2017–18	Northern Premier League; Division One South East	5	3	0	0	—		0	0	5	3
Enfield Town	2018–19	Isthmian League; Premier Division	21	16	0	0	—		4 (Note: Appearances in Alan Turvey Trophy)	5	25	21
Barking (loan)	2018–19	Isthmian League; North Division	5	1	0	0	—		0	0	5	1
Charlton Athletic	2019–20	Championship	9	1	1	0	0	0	—		10	1
Charlton Athletic	2020–21	League One	0	0	0	0	0	0	2 (Note: Appearances in EFL Trophy)	0	2	0
Charlton Athletic	2021–22	League One	15	2	3	1	1	0	4	2	23	5
Charlton Athletic	Total		24	3	4	1	1	0	6	2	35	6
Woking (loan)	2020–21	National League	11	3	2	2	—		1 (Note: Appearance in FA Trophy)	0	14	5
Forest Green Rovers (loan)	2020–21	League Two	20	3	—		—		2 (Note: Appearances in League Two play-offs)	0	22	3
Swindon Town (loan)	2021–22	League Two	21	9	—		—		2	0	23	9
AFC Wimbledon	2022–23	League Two	37	9	3	0	1	0	4	1	45	10
AFC Wimbledon	2023–24	League Two	36	4	3	1	2	0	6	3	47	8
AFC Wimbledon	Total		73	13	6	1	3	0	10	4	92	18
Tranmere Rovers	2024–25	League Two	32	3	0	0	2	0	4	1	38	4
Tranmere Rovers	2025–26	League Two	24	2	0	0	1	0	4	1	29	3
Tranmere Rovers	Total		56	5	0	0	3	0	8	2	67	7
Cheltenham Town (loan)	2025–26	League Two	16	1	0	0	0	0	0	0	16	1
Shrewsbury Town	2026–27	League Two	11	3	0	0	2	1	1	0	14	4
Career total			264	60	12	4	9	1	35	13	320	78
