= Will Brook =

English footballer (born 2003)

Personal information
- Full name: William Michael Brook
- Date of birth: 9 November 2003 (age 23)
- Place of birth: Pontefract, England
- Height: 1.90 m (6 ft 3 in)
- Position: Goalkeeper

Team information
- Current team: Shrewsbury Town
- Number: 1

Youth career
- Leeds United
- 2023–2024: Nottingham Forest

Senior career*
Years	Team	Apps	(Gls)
2024–2025	Nottingham Forest	0	(0)
2025	→ Farsley Celtic (loan)	16	(0)
2025	Leamington	2	(0)
2025–	Shrewsbury Town	36	(0)
- * Club domestic league appearances and goals as of 13:52, 22 November 2026 (UTC)

William Michael Brook (born 9 November 2003) is an English professional footballer who plays as a goalkeeper for Shrewsbury Town.

== Career ==
Born in Pontefract, Brook began his career at Leeds United, where he turned professional in July 2022, before moving to Nottingham Forest in summer 2023. He had a loan spell at Farsley Celtic in the second half of the 2024–25 season. Brook signed for Leamington in August 2025. He moved to Shrewsbury Town later that month. Head coach Michael Appleton said that Brook had been signed to compete with Elyh Harrison for the starting spot. He made his debut in the next game, a 3–1 victory away at Barnet. Brook credited his non-league experience for helping him challenge for the first-team place, and he kept his first clean sheet in his fourth appearance for the club.
