= Elyh Harrison =

English footballer (born 2006)

Personal information
- Full name: Elyh Samuel Harrison
- Date of birth: 19 February 2006 (age 20)
- Place of birth: Redbridge, England
- Height: 6 ft 0 in (1.82 m)
- Position: Goalkeeper

Team information
- Current team: Greenock Morton (on loan from Manchester United)
- Number: 1

Youth career
- West Ham United
- –2022: Stevenage
- 2022–: Manchester United

Senior career*
Years	Team	Apps	(Gls)
2024–	Manchester United	0	(0)
2024–2025	→ Chester (loan)	18	(0)
2025–2026	→ Shrewsbury Town (loan)	6	(0)
2026–	→ Greenock Morton (loan)	7	(0)

International career^{‡}
2023–2024	England U18	2	(0)
2023	England U19	1	(0)
2025–	England U20	2	(0)
- * Club domestic league appearances and goals as of 11:01, 1 October 2026 (UTC) ‡ National team caps and goals as of 13:00, 9 October 2025 (UTC)

Elyh Samuel Harrison (born 19 February 2006) is an English footballer who plays as a goalkeeper for Scottish Championship club Greenock Morton on loan from Premier League club Manchester United.

== Club career ==
As a youth player, Harrison joined the youth academy of Premier League side West Ham. Subsequently, he joined the youth academy of Stevenage. In 2022, he joined the youth academy of Premier League side Manchester United and helped the under-18 team win the 2024 Premier League Cup. Two years later, he was sent on loan to Chester, where he made eighteen league appearances.

On 22 July 2025, Harrison joined League Two club Shrewsbury Town on a season-long loan deal.

On 28 July 2026, Harrison joined Scottish Championship side Greenock Morton on a season-long loan deal.

== International career ==
Harrison played for the England national under-18 football team and the England national under-19 football team. English newspaper Manchester Evening News wrote in 2024 that he was "one of the most promising homegrown goalkeepers of his generation". Through his parents, he is eligible to play for the South Africa national soccer team.

== Career statistics ==
=== Club ===
As of match played 13 September 2025

Appearances and goals by club, season and competition
Club	Season	League			FA Cup		EFL Cup		Other		Total	
Club	Season	Division	Apps	Goals	Apps	Goals	Apps	Goals	Apps	Goals	Apps	Goals
Manchester United U21	2023–24	—			—		—		2 (Note: Appearance(s) in EFL Trophy)	0	2	0
Manchester United U21	2024–25	—			—		—		0	0	0	0
Manchester United U21	2025–26	—			—		—		0	0	0	0
Manchester United U21	Total		—		—		—		2	0	2	0
Chester (loan)	2024–25	National League North	18	0	4	0	0	0	1 (Note: Appearance(s) in FA Trophy)	0	23	0
Shrewsbury Town (loan)	2025–26	League Two	5	0	0	0	1	0	1	0	7	0
Greenock Morton (loan)	2026–27	Scottish Championship	0	0	0	0	0	0	0	0	0	0
Career total			23	0	4	0	1	0	4	0	32	0

== Honours ==
Individual

- Denzil Haroun Reserve Team Player of the Year: 2023–24
