= Isaac Lee (footballer) =

South Korean footballer (born 2003)

Personal information
- Date of birth: 3 September 2003 (age 23)
- Place of birth: Seoul, South Korea
- Height: 1.95 m (6 ft 5 in)
- Position: Centre-back

Team information
- Current team: Shrewsbury Town
- Number: 23

Youth career
- Stoke City
- AFC Fylde
- Tottington United

Senior career*
Years	Team	Apps	(Gls)
2023	Ramsbottom United	5	(0)
2023–2025	Radcliffe	0	(0)
2023	→ Prestwich Heys (loan)	4	(0)
2023	→ Widnes (loan)	2	(0)
2024	→ Stafford Rangers (loan)	9	(0)
2024–2025	→ Flint Town United (loan)	28	(1)
2025–2026	Flint Town United	19	(1)
2026–	Shrewsbury Town	3	(0)
- * Club domestic league appearances and goals as of 23:59, 2 May 2026 (UTC)

Isaac Lee, also known as Lee Isaac, (born 3 September 2003) is a South Korean professional footballer who plays as a centre-back for EFL League Two club Shrewsbury Town.

== Career ==
Lee was born in South Korea and moved to England for his education, aged 11. He joined the Stoke City academy; he also played for the academy of AFC Fylde, Tottington United, and Radcliffe. He joined Ramsbottom United from Tottington United and made five appearances in 2023, debuting during the 3–0 loss against Witton Albion on 4 March 2023.

He then joined Radcliffe ahead of the 2023–24 season after impressing on trial in pre-season and his only appearance for the club was during the 2–1 loss against Padiham during the Lancashire FA Challenge Trophy second round on 5 December 2023; he won the Northern Premier League Premier Division in his first season at the club. During the 2023–24 season, he was loaned out to Prestwich Heys, Widnes, and Stafford Rangers.

He was loaned out to Flint Town United in August 2024 and debuted during the 4–1 loss against The New Saints on 18 August. He scored his first goal for the club during the 4–2 victory against Newtown on 4 October. He joined Flint Town United on a permanent deal in January 2025.

He joined EFL League Two club Shrewsbury Town on 22 January 2026. He debuted for Shrewsbury Town on 18 April 2026 during the 0–0 draw against Crawley Town.

== Career statistics ==
As of match played 2 May 2026

Appearances and goals by club, season and competition
Club	Season	League			National cup (Note: Includes FA Cup, Welsh Cup)		League cup (Note: Includes EFL Cup, Welsh League Cup)		Other		Total	
Club	Season	Division	Apps	Goals	Apps	Goals	Apps	Goals	Apps	Goals	Apps	Goals
Ramsbottom United	2022–23	Northern Premier League Division One West	5	0	—		—		—		5	0
Radcliffe	2023–24	Northern Premier League Premier Division	0	0	—		—		1 (Note: Appearance in Lancashire FA Challenge Trophy.)	0	1	0
Radcliffe	2024–25	National League North	0	0	—		—		—		0	0
Prestwich Heys (loan)	2023–24	North West Counties Football League Premier Division	4	0	2	0	—		0	0	6	0
Widnes (loan)	2023–24	Northern Premier League Division One West	2	0	—		—		0	0	2	0
Stafford Rangers (loan)	2023–24	Northern Premier League Premier Division	9	0	—		—		0	0	9	0
Flint Town United (loan)	2024–25	Cymru Premier	28	1	2	0	0	0	—		30	1
Flint Town United	2025–26	Cymru Premier	19	1	3	0	—		—		22	0
Shrewsbury Town	2025–26	EFL League Two	3	0	—		—		—		3	0
Career total			70	2	7	0	0	0	1	0	78	2

== Honours ==
Radcliffe

- Northern Premier League Premier Division: 2023–24
