= Hugo Aiston =

English footballer (born 2010)

Personal information
- Date of birth: 27 August 2010 (age 16)
- Position: Midfielder

Team information
- Current team: Shrewsbury Town
- Number: 46

Youth career
- 2018–: Shrewsbury Town

Senior career*
Years	Team	Apps	(Gls)
2026–	Shrewsbury Town	1	(0)
- * Club domestic league appearances and goals as of 16:39, 30 May 2026 (UTC)

Hugo Aiston (born 27 August 2010) is an English footballer who plays as a midfielder for EFL League Two club Shrewsbury Town.

== Early life ==
Hugo is the son of former professional footballer Sam Aiston.

== Career ==
Aged eight, Aiston joined the Shrewsbury Town academy at under-9s level.

On 2 May 2026, Aiston made his first-team debut as a late substitute in a 1–0 defeat to Gillingham. Aged 15 years and 248 days, he broke the record for Shrewsbury Town's youngest ever player. Following the match, manager Gavin Cowan said that Aiston had deserved the opportunity and that they 'couldn't put it [making his debut] off' any longer.
