= Gavin Cowan (footballer) =

English footballer (born 1981)

Personal information
- Date of birth: 24 May 1981 (age 45)
- Place of birth: Hanover, West Germany
- Position: Defender

Team information
- Current team: Shrewsbury Town (manager)

Senior career*
| Years | Team | Apps | (Gls) |
| 2001–2003 | Braintree Town | 43 | (5) |
| 2003–2005 | Canvey Island | 44 | (4) |
| 2005 | → Nuneaton Borough (loan) | 13 | (2) |
| 2005–2007 | Shrewsbury Town | 24 | (1) |
| 2006 | → Kidderminster Harriers (loan) | 5 | (0) |
| 2007 | Grays Athletic | 8 | (0) |
| 2007 | → Nuneaton Borough (loan) | 8 | (2) |
| 2007–2008 | Nuneaton Borough | 30 | (1) |
| 2008–2010 | AFC Telford United | 89 | (5) |
| 2010 | Fleetwood Town | | |
| 2010–2012 | Gainsborough Trinity | | |
| 2012–2015 | Nuneaton Town | 88 | (4) |
| 2015–2016 | Solihull Moors | 6 | (1) |
| 2016–2018 | AFC Telford United | 0 | (0) |

Managerial career
- 2018–2021: AFC Telford United
- 2023–2026: Brackley Town
- 2026–: Shrewsbury Town
- * Club domestic league appearances and goals

Gavin Cowan (born 24 May 1981) is an English football manager and former player who is the manager of EFL League Two club Shrewsbury Town.

As a player he was a footballer and a centre-back. He notably played as a professional in the Football League for Shrewsbury Town. He has also played for Braintree Town, Canvey Island, Nuneaton Borough, Kidderminster Harriers, Grays Athletic, AFC Telford United, Fleetwood Town and Gainsborough Trinity.

== Career ==
Cowan began his career at non-League club Braintree Town and moved to Canvey Island in 2003. He fell out of favour with Canvey Island manager Jeff King and in early 2005 was sent out on loan to Nuneaton Borough.

Impressing for the Football Conference side, he was spotted by Shrewsbury Town who signed him on a permanent deal in March 2005.

Shrewsbury did not use him regularly, with Cowan playing 15 times in the 2005–06 season. Early into the 2006–07 season he was sent out on loan to Kidderminster Harriers to gain more experience. He was recalled from this loan a few days short of the agreed month, in order to give him more preparation time for Shrewsbury's next league game, for which he appeared on the bench.

Shrewsbury Town cancelled his contract on 1 January 2007, allowing him to join Grays Athletic. In March 2007, Cowan returned to Nuneaton Borough on one-month loan. Cowan was released by Grays Athletic by mutual consent on 9 June 2007.

Finally after two loan previous spells in his career, he returned to Nuneaton Borough signing a two-year contract on 17 June 2007 ready for the club's Conference North promotion campaign ahead. Cowan's contract with Nuneaton was however announced to have been cancelled by mutual consent on 30 May 2008.

After returning to Essex briefly Cowan decided Shropshire was the place for him and so returned opting to come out of full-time football signing a two-year at Nuneaton Borough while looking to pursue a career in sports development.

He studied for a sports science degree at Shrewsbury College and had taken his coaching badges. He had also been involved with the Football Association helping to coach children of all ages and abilities. Cowan then signed for AFC Telford which enabled him to combine football with studying and coaching which he is hoping will all benefit him in his desire to give something back into a game that has been so good to him.

In January 2010, Cowan signed for Conference North rivals Fleetwood Town following his release by Telford, making his debut on 7 February away at Corby. He joined Gainsborough Trinity in March 2010.

Cowan left Gainsborough after the 2011/12 season to join Nuneaton Town, the club that reformed from Cowan's former team Nuneaton Borough, after they were promoted to the Conference Premier. Coincidentally Nuneaton had been promoted by beating Cowan's Gainsborough in the playoff final the previous season (although Cowan did not play in the final due to injury).

On 18 May 2015, Cowan signed for National League North side Solihull Moors as player/coach. He left at the end of the 2015–2016 season.

== Coaching career ==
In May 2023, Cowan was appointed manager of the defeated National League North play-off final club Brackley Town.

Following a second consecutive play-off final defeat for Brackley in the 2023–24 season, Cowan finally led Brackley to promotion in the 2024–25 season, defeating Farsley Celtic on the final day of the season to lift the title. Following his side's title success, he was named as National League North Manager of the Season

On 29 January 2026, Cowan resigned as Brackley manager and was appointed head coach of his former club Shrewsbury Town, then 21st in League Two. Having won his first five matches in charge, he was named EFL League Two Manager of the Month for February.

== Outside football ==
Cowan is both founder, and head coach of his own Football Academy, The Crossbar Group, coaching Children on Football, life skills and general guidance on a healthy life style.

In December 2021 Cowan, along with his ex Shrewsbury Town teammates Dave Edwards and Sam Aiston, launched the podcast, In The Stiffs.

== Managerial statistics ==
As of match played 21 November 2026

Managerial record by team and tenure
| Team | From | To | Record | | | | | Ref. |
| Team | From | To | P | W | D | L | Win % | Ref. |
|---|---|---|---|---|---|---|---|---|
| AFC Telford United | 11 May 2018 | 5 October 2021 | 116 | 42 | 31 | 43 | 36.2 | |
| Brackley Town | 16 May 2023 | 29 January 2026 | 144 | 70 | 31 | 43 | 48.6 | |
| Shrewsbury Town | 29 January 2026 | Present | 42 | 17 | 6 | 19 | 40.5 | |
| Total | | | 302 | 129 | 68 | 105 | 42.7 | |

== Honours ==
=== Player ===
AFC Telford United

- Conference League Cup: 2008–09

=== Manager ===
Brackley Town

- National League North: 2024–25

Individual

- National League North Manager of the Season: 2024–25
- EFL League Two Manager of the Month: February 2026
