= Kalala =

Kalala may refer to:

== Entertainment ==
- Kalala (film), a 2006 Chadian documentary film
- "Kalala", song by Ilaiyaraaja from the soundtrack of the 1987 film Sri Kanaka Mahalakshmi Recording Dance Troupe

== Geography ==
- Kalala Island, an island on the Kafue River in the Itezhi-Tezhi region of Zambia
- Kalala Station, a pastoral lease and cattle station in the Northern Territory of Australia
- Calala, New South Wales (formerly anglicized as "Kalala"), a suburb of Tamworth in Australia

== People ==
=== Given name ===
- Kalala Ilunga (born 16th century), a king and emperor of the Luba Empire
- Pierre Kalala Mukendi (1939–2015), DR Congolese football forward
- Jean Kalala N'Tumba (1949–2021), DR Congolese football forward
- Jean-Philippe Omotunde (Nioussérê Kalala Omotunde; 1967–2022), Guadeloupean writer

=== Surname ===
- Désiré Kalala, DR Congolese keyboardist in Wenge Musica
- Eric Kalala (born 1979), DR Congolese transportation and logistics executive
- Hamza Kalala, Tanzanian musician in Vijana Jazz
- Jacques Kalala, DR Congolese politician; mayor of Gombe, Kinshasa 1970–1971
- Jean Goubald Kalala (born 1961), DR Congolese guitarist and singer from Lemba, Kinshasa
- Jean-Paul Kalala (born 1982), DR Congolese football midfielder
- Souhaib Kalala (born 1991), Syrian swimmer
- Tshisungu Kalala, DR Congolese swimmer in the Men's 50 metre breaststroke at the 2013 World Aquatics Championships
- Makassy (Alrick Kalala; born 1984), French footballer and singer-songwriter of Congolese origin
- Lu Kala (Lusamba Kalala; born 1995), DR Congolese-Canadian singer
- Fiston Mayele (Mayele Fiston Kalala; born 1994), DR Congolese football forward
- Kalvin Lumbombo-Kalala (born 1998), French football winger

== Other uses ==
- Cedusa kalala, an insect species of planthoppers; see List of Cedusa species
