= 2018–19 Cheltenham Town F.C. season =

Cheltenham Town F.C
2018–19 season
- Chairman: Andy Wilcox
- Manager: Gary Johnson (Until 21 August 2018); Michael Duff (From 10 September)
- Stadium: Whaddon Road
- League Two: 16th
- FA Cup: Second round
- EFL Cup: Second round
- EFL Trophy: Third round
| Home colours | Away colours |

The 2018–19 season was Cheltenham Town's 132nd season in existence and their third consecutive season in League Two. Along with competing in League Two, the club participated in the FA Cup, EFL Cup and EFL Trophy.

The season covered the period from 1 July 2018 to 30 June 2019.

== Players ==
=== First team squad ===
As of 26 July 2018

| No. | Name | Nat | Position | Since | Date of birth (age) | Signed from | Games | Goals |
Goalkeepers
| 1 | Scott Flinders | (England) | GK | 2017 | 12 June 1986 (age 40) | (England) Macclesfield Town | 43 | 0 |
| 22 | Rhys Lovett | (England) | GK | 2015 | 15 June 1997 (age 29) | (England) Rochdale | 2 | 0 |
Defenders
| 2 | Sean Long | (Republic of Ireland) | RB | 2018 | 2 May 1995 (age 31) | (England) Lincoln City | 0 | 0 |
| 3 | Chris Hussey | (England) | LB | 2018 | 2 January 1989 (age 37) | (England) Sheffield United | 0 | 0 |
| 5 | Johnny Mullins | (England) | CB | 2018 | 6 November 1985 (age 41) | (England) Luton Town | 0 | 0 |
| 15 | Will Boyle | (England) | CB | 2017 | 1 September 1995 (age 31) | (England) Huddersfield Town | 63 | 7 |
| 17 | Joshua Debayo | (Nigeria) | LB | 2018 | 17 October 1996 (age 30) | (England) Leicester City | 0 | 0 |
| 18 | Matt Bower | (England) | CB | 2016 | 11 December 1998 (age 27) | Academy | 7 | 0 |
| 23 | Jordon Forster | (Scotland) | CB | 2017 | 23 September 1993 (age 33) | (Scotland) Hibernian | 6 | 0 |
Midfielders
| 4 | Ben Tozer | (England) | DM | 2018 | 1 March 1990 (age 36) | (Wales) Newport County | 0 | 0 |
| 6 | Nigel Atangana | (France) | CM | 2017 | 9 September 1989 (age 37) | (England) Leyton Orient | 35 | 1 |
| 7 | Conor Thomas | (England) | DM | 2018 | 29 October 1993 (age 33) | (India) ATK | 0 | 0 |
| 8 | Kevin Dawson | (Republic of Ireland) | RW | 2017 | 30 June 1990 (age 36) | (England) Yeovil Town | 37 | 6 |
| 11 | Ryan Broom | (Wales) | RW | 2018 | 4 September 1996 (age 30) | (England) Bristol Rovers | 0 | 0 |
| 14 | Tom Smith | (England) | CM | 2018 | 25 February 1998 (age 28) | (England) Swindon Town | 0 | 0 |
| 16 | Alex Addai | (England) | RW | 2018 | 20 December 1993 (age 32) | (England) Merstham | 0 | 0 |
| 20 | Jacob Maddox | (England) | CM | 2018 | 3 November 1998 (age 28) | (England) Chelsea | 0 | 0 |
Forwards
| 9 | Manny Duku | (Netherlands) | CF | 2018 | 28 December 1992 (age 33) | (England) Hayes & Yeading United | 0 | 0 |
| 19 | George Lloyd | (England) | CF | 2017 | 11 February 2000 (age 26) | Academy | 8 | 2 |
| 21 | Brian Graham | (Scotland) | CF | 2017 | 23 November 1987 (age 38) | (Scotland) Hibernian | 31 | 6 |

== Competitions ==
=== Pre-season friendlies ===
The Robins revealed friendlies with Bristol City, Cirencester Town, Reading U23s, Evesham United, Birmingham City, Weston-super-Mare and Walsall.

| 10 July 2018 Friendly | Bristol City | 4–2 | Cheltenham Town | Weston-super-Mare |
| 19:30 BST | Taylor 5'; Eliasson 34', 37'; Webster 39' | Report | Mullins 43'; Dawes 62' | Stadium: Woodspring Stadium; Referee: Kevin Friend |

| 13 July 2018 Friendly | Cirencester Town | 0–4 | Cheltenham Town | Cirencester |
| 19:45 BST | | Report | Eisa 7', 8', 43'; Trialist 27' | Stadium: Corinium Stadium; Referee: Derek Eaton |

| 17 July 2018 Friendly | Reading U23s | 4–1 | Cheltenham Town | Finchampstead |
| 13:00 BST | | | | Stadium: Hogwood Park |

| 19 July 2018 Friendly | Evesham United | 0–3 | Cheltenham Town | Evesham |
| 19:45 BST | | | | Stadium: Jubilee Stadium |

| 21 July 2018 Friendly | Cheltenham Town | 0–3 | Birmingham City | Cheltenham |
| 15:00 BST | | Report | Lakin 26'; Lubabla 52'; N'Doye 89' (pen.) | Stadium: Jonny-Rocks Stadium; Attendance: 2,234; Referee: Kevin Johnson |

| 24 July 2018 Friendly | Weston-super-Mare | 4–1 | Cheltenham Town | Weston-super-Mare |
| 19:45 BST | Lucas 18' (pen.), 54'; Hill 35'; Welch 43' | Report | Clift 65' | Stadium: Woodspring Stadium |

| 28 July 2018 Friendly | Cheltenham Town | 1–2 | Walsall | Cheltenham |
| 15:00 BST | Graham 89' (pen.) | Report | Devlin 45+1'; Cook 80' | Stadium: Jonny-Rocks Stadium; Attendance: 1,130; Referee: John Busby |

=== League Two ===
==== League table ====
| Pos | Team | Pld | W | D | L | GF | GA | GD | Pts |
|---|---|---|---|---|---|---|---|---|---|
| 14 | Oldham Athletic | 46 | 16 | 14 | 16 | 67 | 60 | +7 | 62 |
| 15 | Northampton Town | 46 | 14 | 19 | 13 | 64 | 63 | +1 | 61 |
| 16 | Cheltenham Town | 46 | 15 | 12 | 19 | 57 | 68 | −11 | 57 |
| 17 | Grimsby Town | 46 | 16 | 8 | 22 | 45 | 56 | −11 | 56 |
| 18 | Morecambe | 46 | 14 | 12 | 20 | 54 | 70 | −16 | 54 |

Source: EFL Official Website
Rules for classification: 1) Points; 2) Goal difference; 3) Number of goals scored; 4) Head-to-head results

==== Results summary ====
| Overall | | | | | | | | Home | | | | | | Away | | | | | |
| Pld | W | D | L | GF | GA | GD | Pts | W | D | L | GF | GA | GD | W | D | L | GF | GA | GD |
|---|---|---|---|---|---|---|---|---|---|---|---|---|---|---|---|---|---|---|---|
| 46 | 15 | 12 | 19 | 57 | 68 | −11 | 57 | 10 | 7 | 6 | 34 | 29 | +5 | 5 | 5 | 13 | 23 | 39 | −16 |

Last updated: 4 May 2019.
Source: BBC

==== Results by matchday ====
| Matchday | 1 | 2 | 3 | 4 | 5 | 6 | 7 | 8 | 9 | 10 | 11 | 12 | 13 | 14 | 15 | 16 | 17 | 18 | 19 | 20 | 21 | 22 | 23 | 24 | 25 | 26 | 27 | 28 | 29 | 30 | 31 | 32 | 33 | 34 | 35 | 36 | 37 | 38 | 39 | 40 | 41 | 42 | 43 | 44 | 45 | 46 |
|---|---|---|---|---|---|---|---|---|---|---|---|---|---|---|---|---|---|---|---|---|---|---|---|---|---|---|---|---|---|---|---|---|---|---|---|---|---|---|---|---|---|---|---|---|---|---|
| Ground | H | A | H | A | A | H | A | H | A | H | H | A | A | A | H | H | A | H | A | H | A | A | H | H | A | A | H | A | H | H | A | A | H | H | A | H | H | A | H | A | H | A | H | A | H | A |
| Result | L | L | L | D | W | L | W | D | L | L | D | L | D | L | L | D | W | W | L | W | D | D | W | D | W | L | L | L | W | W | L | L | W | W | L | D | W | L | W | W | D | D | D | L | W | L |
| Position | 17 | 22 | 22 | 22 | 20 | 21 | 18 | 18 | 18 | 19 | 20 | 21 | 22 | 23 | 23 | 23 | 22 | 22 | 22 | 21 | 21 | 21 | 19 | 19 | 18 | 18 | 18 | 21 | 18 | 18 | 18 | 19 | 18 | 17 | 17 | 17 | 17 | 17 | 17 | 16 | 16 | 16 | 16 | 16 | 16 | 16 |

Updated to match(es) played on 4 May 2019. Source: Statto.com
A = Away; H = Home; W = Win; D = Draw; L = Loss

==== Matches ====
On 21 June 2018, the League Two fixtures for the forthcoming season were announced.

| 4 August 2018 1 | Cheltenham Town | 0–1 | Crawley Town | Cheltenham |
| 15:00 BST | | Report | Palmer 63' | Stadium: Whaddon Road; Attendance: 2,719; Referee: Thomas Bramall |

| 11 August 2018 2 | Tranmere Rovers | 1–0 | Cheltenham Town | Birkenhead |
| 15:00 BST | Norwood 13' | Report | | Stadium: Prenton Park; Attendance: 6,736; Referee: Ben Toner |

| 18 August 2018 3 | Cheltenham Town | 0–1 | Carlisle United | Cheltenham |
| 15:00 BST | | Report | Bennett 39' | Stadium: Whaddon Road; Attendance: 2,455; Referee: Peter Wright |

| 21 August 2018 4 | Macclesfield Town | 1–1 | Cheltenham Town | Macclesfield |
| 19:45 BST | Whitaker 19' | Report | Duku 85' | Stadium: Moss Rose; Attendance: 1,496; Referee: Paul Marsden |

| 25 August 2018 5 | Cambridge United | 0–1 | Cheltenham Town | Cambridge |
| 15:00 BST | | Report | Jones 66' | Stadium: Abbey Stadium; Attendance: 3,660; Referee: Matt Donohue |

| 1 September 2018 6 | Cheltenham Town | 1–3 | Colchester United | Cheltenham |
| 15:00 BST | Dawson 56' | Report | Norris 12' (pen.), 26'; Pell 88' (pen.) | Stadium: Whaddon Road; Attendance: 2,789; Referee: Ollie Yates |

| 8 September 2018 7 | Northampton Town | 1–3 | Cheltenham Town | Northampton |
| 15:00 BST | van Veen 62' (pen.) | Report | Boyle 36'; Thomas 77' (pen.); Mooney 83' | Stadium: Sixfields Stadium; Attendance: 4,608; Referee: Lee Collins |

| 15 September 2018 8 | Cheltenham Town | 0–0 | Crewe Alexandra | Cheltenham |
| 15:00 BST | | Report | | Stadium: Whaddon Road; Attendance: 2,921; Referee: Brett Huxtable |

| 22 September 2018 9 | Exeter City | 3–1 | Cheltenham Town | Exeter |
| 15:00 BST | Sweeney 46'; Stockley 80'; Forte 88' | Report | Broom 42' | Stadium: St James Park; Attendance: 3,723; Referee: Michael Salisbury |

| 29 September 2018 10 | Cheltenham Town | 0–2 | Lincoln City | Cheltenham |
| 15:00 BST | | Report | Alcock 74' (o.g.); McCartan 80' | Stadium: Whaddon Road; Attendance: 3,202; Referee: Dean Whitestone |

| 2 October 2018 11 | Cheltenham Town | 2–2 | Morecambe | Cheltenham |
| 19:45 BST | Varney 44', 90+4' | Report | Cranston 32'; Oates 54' | Stadium: Whaddon Road; Attendance: 2,095; Referee: Neil Hair |

| 6 October 2018 12 | MK Dons | 3–0 | Cheltenham Town | Milton Keynes |
| 15:00 BST | Aneke 34'; Healey 84'; Simpson 90+9' (pen.) | Report | Maddox (yellow card) 90' | Stadium: Stadium MK; Attendance: 6,503; Referee: Tom Nield |

| 20 October 2018 13 | Forest Green Rovers | 1–1 | Cheltenham Town | Nailsworth |
| 15:00 BST | Mills 75' | Report | Barnett 26' | Stadium: The New Lawn; Attendance: 3,582; Referee: Kevin Johnson |

| 23 October 2018 14 | Oldham Athletic | 2–0 | Cheltenham Town | Oldham |
| 19:45 BST | Benteke 75'; Lang 90+3' | Report | Jones (red card) 45' | Stadium: Boundary Park; Attendance: 2,865; Referee: Ben Toner |

| 27 October 2018 15 | Cheltenham Town | 0–2 | Stevenage | Cheltenham |
| 15:00 BST | | Report | Guthrie 18'; Seddon 45+1'; Cuthbert (yellow card) 56'; Hunt (yellow card) 67' | Stadium: Whaddon Road; Attendance: 2,382; Referee: Matt Donohue |

| 3 November 2018 16 | Cheltenham Town | 2–2 | Mansfield Town | Cheltenham |
| 15:00 GMT | Tozer 10'; Boyle 45' | Report | Walker 7', 90+3' | Stadium: Whaddon Road; Attendance: 2,828; Referee: Neil Hair |

| 17 November 2018 17 | Notts County | 0–3 | Cheltenham Town | Nottingham |
| 15:00 GMT | | Report | Varney 35', 66'; Barnett 87' | Stadium: Meadow Lane; Attendance: 6,109; Referee: Darren Drysdale |

| 24 November 2018 18 | Cheltenham Town | 2–1 | Newport County | Cheltenham |
| 15:00 GMT | Boyle 18'; Barnett 44' | Report | Semenyo 89' | Stadium: Whaddon Road; Attendance: 3,672; Referee: Alan Young |

| 27 November 2018 19 | Bury | 4–1 | Cheltenham Town | Bury |
| 19:45 GMT | Stokes 14'; Maynard 39', 79'; Moore 72' | Report | Clements 25' | Stadium: Gigg Lane; Attendance: 2,779; Referee: Carl Boyeson |

| 8 December 2018 20 | Cheltenham Town | 2–1 | Grimsby Town | Cheltenham |
| 15:00 GMT | Broom 29'; Thomas 90+2' (pen.) | Report | Embleton 63' | Stadium: Whaddon Road; Attendance: 2,775; Referee: Paul Marsden |

| 15 December 2018 21 | Port Vale | 2–2 | Cheltenham Town | Burslem |
| 15:00 GMT | Montaño 13'; Vassell (yellow card) 60'; Legge (yellow card) 81'; Kay 90+3' | Report | Jones 26'; Atangana 89' | Stadium: Vale Park; Attendance: 3,109; Referee: Graham Salisbury |

| 22 December 2018 22 | Swindon Town | 0–0 | Cheltenham Town | Swindon |
| 15:00 GMT | Dunne (yellow card) 56'; Nelson (yellow card) 78' | Report | Clements (yellow card) 6'; Boyle (yellow card) 47'; Forster (yellow card) 57'; Atangana (yellow card) 90+4' | Stadium: County Ground; Attendance: 7,026; Referee: Lee Collins |

| 26 December 2018 23 | Cheltenham Town | 3–1 | Milton Keynes Dons | Cheltenham |
| 15:00 GMT | Atangana 14'; Barnett 44'; Clements (yellow card) 50' (goal) 86' | Report | Aneke 22' (yellow card) 33'; Cissé (yellow card) 57' | Stadium: Whaddon Road; Attendance: 3,266; Referee: Dean Whitestone |

| 29 December 2018 24 | Cheltenham Town | 2–2 | Forest Green Rovers | Cheltenham |
| 15:00 GMT | Varney 78'; Thomas 80'; Maddox (yellow card) 90' | Report | McGinley (yellow card) 44'; Campbell 61'; Williams 67' | Stadium: Whaddon Road; Attendance: 5,125; Referee: Robert Lewis |

| 1 January 2019 25 | Yeovil Town | 1–4 | Cheltenham Town | Yeovil |
| 15:00 GMT | Zoko (yellow card) 15'; James 47'; Dickinson (yellow card) 76'; Gafaiti (yellow card) 79' | Report | Varney 24'; Thomas 34' (pen.); Forster (yellow card) 47' (goal) 77'; Dawson 87' | Stadium: Huish Park; Attendance: 2,883; Referee: Trevor Kettle |

| 5 January 2019 26 | Crawley Town | 1–0 | Cheltenham Town | Crawley |
| 15:00 GMT | Palmer 39' (pen.) | Report | | Stadium: Broadfield Stadium; Attendance: 2,623; Referee: Chris Sarginson |

| 12 January 2019 27 | Cheltenham Town | 1–3 | Tranmere Rovers | Cheltenham |
| 15:00 GMT | Broom (yellow card) 24'; Varney 42' | Report | Banks (yellow card) 39'; Norwood 46'; Miller 61'; McCullough (yellow card) 69'; Banks 72'; Harris (yellow card) 83' | Stadium: Whaddon Road; Attendance: 3,104; Referee: Anthony Coggins |

| 19 January 2019 28 | Carlisle United | 2–0 | Cheltenham Town | Carlisle |
| 15:00 GMT | Devitt 49'; Hope 56' | Report | | Stadium: Brunton Park; Attendance: 4,458; Referee: Carl Boyeson |

| 26 January 2019 29 | Cheltenham Town | 3–2 | Macclesfield Town | Cheltenham |
| 15:00 GMT | Broom (yellow card) 2'; Varney 54'; Maddox 61'; Raglan 79' | Report | Rose 11' (pen.) (yellow card) 19'; Cameron (red card) 20'; Wilson 23'; Smith (yellow card) 31'; Lowe (yellow card) 74'; Welch-Hayes (yellow card) 82' | Stadium: Whaddon Road; Attendance: 3,041; Referee: Anthony Backhouse |

| 2 February 2019 P | Cheltenham Town | P–P | Cambridge United | Cheltenham |
| 15:00 GMT | | Report | | Stadium: Whaddon Road |
Note: Fixture was postponed due to the freezing temperatures.

| 5 February 2019 30 | Cheltenham Town | 1–0 | Yeovil Town | Cheltenham |
| 19:45 GMT | Bingham (yellow card) 44'; Maddox (yellow card) 56'; Varney 59' | Report | James (red card) 21'; Worthington (yellow card) 52'; Gafaiti (yellow card) 55' | Stadium: Whaddon Road; Attendance: 2,457; Referee: Tim Robinson |

| 9 February 2019 31 | Colchester United | 3–0 | Cheltenham Town | Colchester |
| 15:00 GMT | Vincent-Young 30'; Nouble 43'; Eisa 56'; Stevenson (yellow card) 83' | Report | Dawson (yellow card) 79'; Forster (yellow card) 90+1' | Stadium: Colchester Community Stadium; Attendance: 3,026; Referee: Craig Hicks |

| 16 February 2019 32 | Grimsby Town | 1–0 | Cheltenham Town | Cleethorpes |
| 15:00 GMT | Thomas 41' (pen.) | Report | Raglan (yellow card) 44'; Tillson (yellow card) 80' | Stadium: Blundell Park; Attendance: 4,940; Referee: Trevor Kettle |

| 19 February 2019 33 | Cheltenham Town | 2–0 | Cambridge United | Cheltenham |
| 19:45 GMT | Taft 23' (o.g.); Thomas 58' (pen.); Tozer (yellow card) 73'; Waters (penalty missed) 82' | Report | Carroll (red card) 58'; Doyle-Hayes (yellow card) 82' | Stadium: Whaddon Road; Attendance: 2,339; Referee: Paul Marsden |

| 23 February 2019 34 | Cheltenham Town | 1–0 | Port Vale | Cheltenham |
| 15:00 GMT | Varney 34'; Broom (yellow card) 62'; Hussey (yellow card) 90+3' | Report | Montaño (yellow card) 60'; Legge (yellow card) 80' | Stadium: Whaddon Road; Attendance: 3,079; Referee: Nick Kinseley |

| 2 March 2019 35 | Mansfield Town | 4–2 | Cheltenham Town | Mansfield |
| 15:00 GMT | Hamilton 42', 45'; Benning (yellow card) 58'; Atkinson 77'; MacDonald 90+2'; Tomlinson (yellow card) 90+5' | Report | Dawson (yellow card) 30'; Thomas (yellow card) 47'; Hussey 59'; Raglan 68'; Waters (yellow card) 90+5' | Stadium: Field Mill; Attendance: 5,276; Referee: Alan Young |

| 5 March 2019 36 | Cheltenham Town | 1–1 | Bury | Cheltenham |
| 19:45 GMT | Waters 33'; Pring (yellow card) 70'; Tillson (yellow card) 73' | Report | Wharton 13' | Stadium: Whaddon Road; Attendance: 2,409; Referee: Paul Tierney |

| 9 March 2019 37 | Cheltenham Town | 4–1 | Notts County | Cheltenham |
| 15:00 GMT | Boyle 29'; Varney 36' (pen.); Waters 55'; Barnett 88' | Report | Hemmings 69' (pen.); Rose (yellow card) 72' | Stadium: Whaddon Road; Attendance: 3,514; Referee: Thomas Bramall |

| 15 March 2019 38 | Newport County | 1–0 | Cheltenham Town | Newport |
| 19:45 GMT | Hussey 54' (o.g.); Sheehan (yellow card) 86'; Matt (yellow card) 87' | Report | Tozer (yellow card) 33'; Clements (yellow card) 52'; Tillson (yellow card) 70'; Boyle (red card) 75' | Stadium: Rodney Parade; Attendance: 3,192; Referee: Lee Swabey |

| 23 March 2019 39 | Cheltenham Town | 3–1 | Northampton Town | Cheltenham |
| 15:00 GMT | Varney 18', 41' (pen.) (yellow card) 30'; Barnett 73' | Report | Goode (yellow card) 11'; Hughes (yellow card) 41'; Taylor (yellow card) 51'; Foley (yellow card) 72'; Bowditch 89' | Stadium: Whaddon Road; Attendance: 3,513; Referee: Charles Breakspear |

| 30 March 2019 40 | Crewe Alexandra | 1–3 | Cheltenham Town | Crewe |
| 15:00 GMT | Ray (yellow card) 27' (red card) 53'; Taylor-Sinclair 34'; Ng (yellow card) 45+1'; Miller (yellow card) 90+6' | Report | Dawson 45+1'; Waters 74'; Varney 83' (yellow card) 90+6' | Stadium: Gresty Road; Attendance: 3,495; Referee: Trevor Kettle |

| 6 April 2019 41 | Cheltenham Town | 1–1 | Exeter City | Cheltenham |
| 15:00 BST | Thomas 60' (pen.); Tozer (yellow card) 65' | Report | Moxey 36'; Taylor (yellow card) 47'; Pym (yellow card) 54' (yellow-red card) 90+10'; Boateng (yellow card) 90+7' | Stadium: Whaddon Road; Attendance: 4,079; Referee: Brett Huxtable |

| 13 April 2019 42 | Lincoln City | 1–1 | Cheltenham Town | Lincoln |
| 15:00 BST | McCartan 18' (yellow card) 64' | Report | Tillson (yellow card) 37'; Lloyd 73' | Stadium: Sincil Bank; Attendance: 9,820; Referee: Nick Kinseley |

| 19 April 2019 43 | Cheltenham Town | 0–0 | Oldham Athletic | Cheltenham |
| 15:00 BST | Maddox (yellow card) 79' | Report | Edmundson (yellow card) 78' | Stadium: Whaddon Road; Attendance: 4,022; Referee: Ben Toner |

| 22 April 2019 44 | Morecambe | 4–0 | Cheltenham Town | Morecambe |
| 15:00 BST | Collins (penalty missed) 21' 85'; Oliver 49'; Ellison 53'; Lavelle 81' | Report | Thomas (yellow card) 75'; Bingham (yellow card) 80' | Stadium: Globe Arena; Attendance: 3,066; Referee: Jarred Gillett |

| 27 April 2019 45 | Cheltenham Town | 3–2 | Swindon Town | Cheltenham |
| 15:00 BST | Woolfenden 26' (o.g.); Waters 30'; Dawson 37'; Tozer (yellow card) 41'; Boyle (yellow card) 90+2'; Raglan (yellow card) 90+4' | Report | Robinson 84'; Richards 90'; Woolfenden (yellow card) 90+1' | Stadium: Whaddon Road; Attendance: 4,306; Referee: Tom Nield |

| 4 May 2019 46 | Stevenage | 2–0 | Cheltenham Town | Stevenage |
| 15:00 BST | Guthrie (penalty missed) 15'; Martin 56'; Gibson 58' | Report | Maddox (yellow card) 69' | Stadium: Broadhall Way; Attendance: 3,071; Referee: Dean Whitestone |

=== FA Cup ===
The first round draw was made live on BBC by Dennis Wise and Dion Dublin on 22 October. The draw for the second round was made live on BBC and BT by Mark Schwarzer and Glenn Murray on 12 November.

| 10 November 2018 First round | Ebbsfleet United | 0–0 | Cheltenham Town | Northfleet |
| 15:00 GMT | | Report | | Stadium: Stonebridge Road; Attendance: 1,624; Referee: John Busby |

| 20 November 2018 First round replay | Cheltenham Town | 2–0 | Ebbsfleet United | Cheltenham |
| 19:45 GMT | Barnett 66'; Addai 90+4' | Report | Magri (red card) 83' | Stadium: Whaddon Road; Attendance: 1,435; Referee: Chris Sarginson |

| 1 December 2018 Second round | Accrington Stanley | 3–1 | Cheltenham Town | Accrington |
| 15:00 GMT | Zanzala 49'; Kee 66' (pen.); Clark 78' | Report | Addai 73' | Stadium: Crown Ground; Attendance: 1,066; Referee: Andy Haines |

=== EFL Cup ===
On 15 June 2018, the draw for the first round was made in Vietnam. The second round draw was made from the Stadium of Light on 16 August.

| 14 August 2018 First round | Cheltenham Town | 2–2 (6–5 p) | Colchester United | Cheltenham |
| 19:45 BST | Broom 1'; Thomas 71' (pen.) | Report | Szmodics 79'; Norris 80' | Stadium: Whaddon Road; Attendance: 1,179; Referee: Chris Sarginson |
| | Penalties |
| | Thomas (penalty scored); Tozer (penalty scored); Smith (penalty missed); Broom (penalty scored); Kalala (penalty scored); Mullins (penalty scored); Forster (penalty scored) | | Norris (penalty missed); Pell (penalty scored); Szmodics (penalty scored); Nouble (penalty scored); Kent (penalty scored); Dickenson (penalty scored); Senior (penalty missed) |

| 28 August 2018 Second round | Brentford | 1–0 | Cheltenham Town | Brentford |
| 19:45 BST | Jeanvier 40' | Report | | Stadium: Griffin Park; Attendance: 4,384; Referee: Ross Joyce |

=== EFL Trophy ===
On 13 July 2018, the initial group stage draw bar the U21 invited clubs was announced. The draw for the second round was made live on Talksport by Leon Britton and Steve Claridge on 16 November. On 8 December, the third round draw was drawn by Alan McInally and Matt Le Tissier on Soccer Saturday.

| Pos | Lge | Team | Pld | W | PW | PL | L | GF | GA | GD | Pts | Qualification |
|---|---|---|---|---|---|---|---|---|---|---|---|---|
| 1 | L2 | Cheltenham Town | 3 | 2 | 0 | 0 | 1 | 8 | 6 | +2 | 6 | Round 2 |
| 2 | ACA | Arsenal U21 | 3 | 2 | 0 | 0 | 1 | 8 | 7 | +1 | 6 | Round 2 |
| 3 | L2 | Forest Green Rovers | 3 | 1 | 0 | 1 | 1 | 6 | 4 | +2 | 4 | |
| 4 | L1 | Coventry City | 3 | 0 | 1 | 0 | 2 | 1 | 6 | −5 | 2 | |

Source: EFL.com

| 4 September 2018 Group stages | Forest Green Rovers | 4–0 | Cheltenham Town | Nailsworth |
| 19:30 BST | Grubb 14'; Campbell 48'; Williams 85'; Pearce 90+2' | Report | | Stadium: The New Lawn; Attendance: 1,074; Referee: Lee Swabey |

| 30 October 2018 Group stages | Cheltenham Town | 6–2 | Arsenal U21 | Cheltenham |
| 19:45 BST | Clements 8'; Boyle 32'; Maddox 48', 50'; Mooney 84'; Broom 90' | Report | Burton (red card) 7'; John-Jules 35'; Gilmour 62' (pen.) | Stadium: Whaddon Road; Attendance: 1,431 |

| 13 November 2018 Group stages | Cheltenham Town | 2–0 | Coventry City | Cheltenham |
| 19:45 GMT | Maddox 33'; Boyle 48' | Report | | Stadium: Whaddon Road; Attendance: 1,296 |

| 4 December 2018 Second round | Cheltenham Town | 1–1 (7–6 p) | Newport County | Cheltenham |
| 19:45 GMT | Addai 68' | Report | Amond 18' | Stadium: Whaddon Road; Attendance: 739 |
| | Penalties |
| | Thomas (penalty scored); Forster (penalty scored); Tozer (penalty scored); Clements (penalty scored); Jones (penalty scored); Mooney (penalty scored); Field (penalty scored) | | Amond (penalty scored); Butler (penalty scored); Labadie (penalty scored); Sheehan (penalty scored); Semenyo (penalty scored); Demetriou (penalty scored); Harris (penalty missed) |

| 8 January 2019 Third round | Cheltenham Town | 1–1 (1–4 p) | Oxford United | Cheltenham |
| 19:45 GMT | Varney (yellow card) 39'; Alcock (yellow card) 50'; Dawson 64' | Report | Brannagan (yellow card) 36' (goal) 45+1' | Stadium: Whaddon Road; Referee: Ollie Yates |
| | Penalties |
| | Thomas (penalty missed); Clements (penalty missed); Hussey (penalty scored) | | Mousinho (penalty scored); Henry (penalty scored); Graham (penalty scored); Brannagan (penalty scored) |

== Transfers ==
=== Transfers in ===
| Date from | Position | Nationality | Name | From | Fee | Ref. |
|---|---|---|---|---|---|---|
| 1 July 2018 | RW | ENG | Alex Addai | Merstham | Undisclosed | |
| 1 July 2018 | RM | WAL | Ryan Broom | Bristol Rovers | Free transfer | |
| 1 July 2018 | LB | ENG | Chris Hussey | Sheffield United | Free transfer | |
| 1 July 2018 | RB | IRL | Sean Long | Lincoln City | Free transfer | |
| 1 July 2018 | CB | ENG | Johnny Mullins | Luton Town | Free transfer | |
| 1 July 2018 | CM | ENG | Tom Smith | Swindon Town | Free transfer | |
| 1 July 2018 | DM | ENG | Conor Thomas | ATK | Free transfer | |
| 1 July 2018 | DM | ENG | Ben Tozer | Newport County | Free transfer | |
| 10 July 2018 | LB | NGA | Josh Debayo | Leicester City | Free transfer | |
| 26 July 2018 | ST | NED | Manny Duku | Hayes & Yeading United | Undisclosed | |
| 28 July 2018 | CF | IRL | Liam McAlinden | Exeter City | Free transfer | |
| 3 August 2018 | CM | FRA | Kalvin Lumbombo-Kalala | Savona | Free transfer | |
| 27 August 2018 | CM | ENG | Chris Clements | Grimsby Town | Free transfer | |
| 7 September 2018 | RB | ENG | Craig Alcock | Doncaster Rovers | Free transfer | |
| 28 September 2018 | LW | ENG | Luke Varney | Burton Albion | Free transfer | |
| 7 January 2019 | CF | ENG | Tyrone Barnett | Port Vale | Free transfer | |
| 31 January 2019 | CF | ENG | Rakish Bingham | Hamilton Academical | Free transfer | |

=== Transfers out ===
| Date from | Position | Nationality | Name | To | Fee | Ref. |
|---|---|---|---|---|---|---|
| 1 July 2018 | LB | WAL | Jordan Cranston | Morecambe | Released | |
| 1 July 2018 | CB | AUS | Aaron Downes | Retired | —N/a | |
| 1 July 2018 | CF | ENG | Jaanai Gordon | Tamworth | Released | |
| 1 July 2018 | CB | ENG | Jamie Grimes | Macclesfield Town | Released | |
| 1 July 2018 | CF | ENG | Dan Holman | Aldershot Town | Released | |
| 1 July 2018 | LW | ENG | Sanmi Odelusi | FC Halifax Town | Released | |
| 1 July 2018 | DM | ENG | Adam Page | Gloucester City | Released | |
| 1 July 2018 | CM | ENG | Harry Pell | Colchester United | Undisclosed | |
| 1 July 2018 | LW | ENG | Jerell Sellars | Östersunds | Rejected contract | |
| 1 July 2018 | CM | ENG | Josh Thomas | Gloucester City | Released | |
| 1 July 2018 | RM | NIR | Carl Winchester | Forest Green Rovers | Free transfer | |
| 1 July 2018 | CF | ENG | Danny Wright | Solihull Moors | Released | |
| 16 July 2018 | WG | ENG | Ben Hailwood | Bishop's Cleeve | Free transfer | |
| 23 July 2018 | CF | SUD | Mohamed Eisa | Bristol City | £1,500,000 | |
| 1 August 2018 | GK | ENG | Lewis Clayton | Bishop's Cleeve | Free transfer | |
| 1 August 2018 | MF | ENG | Lee Llewelyn | Bishop's Cleeve | Free transfer | |
| 2 August 2018 | CF | ENG | Brian Graham | Ross County | Free transfer | |
| 12 October 2018 | AM | FRA | Kalvin Lumbombo Kalala | Torquay United | Free transfer | |
| 29 November 2018 | GK | ENG | Tom Middlehurst | Queens Park Rangers | Free transfer | |
| 1 February 2019 | RB | ENG | Craig Alcock | Yeovil Town | Free transfer | |

=== Loans in ===
| Start date | Position | Nationality | Name | From | End date | Ref. |
|---|---|---|---|---|---|---|
| 26 July 2018 | CM | ENG | Jacob Maddox | Chelsea | 31 May 2019 | |
| 3 August 2018 | CB | ENG | Aden Baldwin | Bristol City | 1 January 2019 | |
| 24 August 2018 | AM | WAL | Sam Jones | Shrewsbury Town | 1 January 2019 | |
| 30 August 2018 | CF | ENG | Tyrone Barnett | Port Vale | 1 January 2019 | |
| 31 August 2018 | LB | IRL | Tom Field | Brentford | 1 January 2019 | |
| 31 August 2018 | CF | ENG | Kelsey Mooney | Aston Villa | 1 January 2019 | |
| 3 January 2019 | LB | ENG | Cameron Pring | Bristol City | 31 May 2019 | |
| 11 January 2019 | SS | ENG | Billy Waters | Northampton Town | 31 May 2019 | |
| 15 January 2019 | CB | ENG | Charlie Raglan | Oxford United | 31 May 2019 | |
| 29 January 2019 | DM | ENG | Jordan Tillson | Exeter City | 31 May 2019 | |

=== Loans out ===
| Start date | Position | Nationality | Name | To | End date | Ref. |
|---|---|---|---|---|---|---|
| 24 August 2018 | CB | ENG | Matt Bower | Weston-super-Mare | 1 January 2019 | |
| 20 September 2018 | CM | ENG | Tom Smith | Bath City | 20 January 2019 | |
| 5 October 2018 | CF | NED | Manny Duku | Barnet | 1 January 2019 | |
| 9 October 2018 | CF | ENG | George Lloyd | Hereford | 4 January 2019 | |
| 11 October 2018 | LB | NGA | Josh Debayo | Dover Athletic | 31 May 2019 | |
| 6 November 2018 | MF | ENG | Will Dawes | Yate Town | Work experience | |
| 19 November 2018 | CM | ENG | Archie Brennan | Lydney Town | Work experience | |
| 19 November 2018 | DF | ENG | Tom Handley | Lydney Town | Work experience | |
| 23 November 2018 | CF | ENG | Aaron Basford | Worcester City | Work experience | |
| 3 December 2018 | DF | ENG | Grant Horton | Worcester City | January 2019 | |
| 6 December 2018 | DF | ENG | Will Dawes | Tuffley Rovers | Work experience | |
| 15 December 2018 | CF | IRL | Liam McAlinden | Brackley Town | 15 January 2019 | |
| 17 December 2018 | MF | ENG | Olly Price | Westfields | Work experience | |
| 21 December 2018 | CM | ENG | Archie Brennan | Slimbridge | Work experience | |
| 21 December 2018 | CF | ENG | Fin Clift | Malvern Town | Work experience | |
| 21 December 2018 | CF | ENG | Camden Duncan | Lydney Town | Work experience | |
| 21 December 2018 | DF | ENG | Ioan Richards | Slimbridge | Work experience | |
| 24 December 2018 | MF | ENG | Tyreece Briscoe | Tuffley Rovers | January 2019 | |
| 17 January 2019 | CF | IRL | Liam McAlinden | Kidderminster Harriers | 18 February 2019 | |
| 18 January 2019 | CF | ENG | George Lloyd | Hereford | 31 May 2019 | |
| 6 February 2019 | GK | ENG | Freddie Lapworth | Gloucester City | Work experience | |
| 27 February 2019 | CF | NED | Manny Duku | FC Halifax Town | April 2019 | |
| 12 March 2019 | CB | ENG | Matt Bower | Weston-super-Mare | April 2019 | |
