= Noa Boutin =

French footballer (born 2003)

Personal information
- Full name: Noa Boutin
- Date of birth: 10 September 2003 (age 23)
- Place of birth: Paris, France
- Height: 1.84 m (6 ft 0 in)
- Position: Left back

Team information
- Current team: Inverness Caledonian Thistle
- Number: 3

Youth career
- 2017–2020: AC Boulogne-Billancourt
- 2020–2022: AFC Bournemouth

Senior career*
Years	Team	Apps	(Gls)
2022–2026	AFC Bournemouth	0	(0)
2022	→ Poole Town (loan)		
2022	→ Weymouth (loan)	8	(0)
2023	→ Gosport Borough (loan)		
2024–2025	→ Eastleigh (loan)	34	(1)
2025–2026	→ Sutton United (loan)	8	(0)
2026–	Inverness Caledonian Thistle	7	(0)
- * Club domestic league appearances and goals as of 21:05, 19 September 2026 (UTC)

Noa Boutin (born 10 September 2003) is a French professional footballer who currently plays for Scottish Championship side, Inverness Caledonian Thistle.

== Early life and career ==
Born in Paris, Boutin played for the footballing division of Parisian sports club AC Boulogne-Billancourt, before being scouted by recently relegated Premier League side, AFC Bournemouth.

In February 2022, Boutin was sent out on loan to Southern League Premier Division side, Poole Town, until the end of the season.

In August 2022, Boutin was sent on loan to National League South side, Weymouth, before returning to Bournemouth in October. Later that season, in January 2023, Boutin returned to the Southern League Premier Division, joining Gosport Borough, on loan until the end of the season.

In August 2024, Boutin joined National League side, Eastleigh, on loan for a season, before returning to the National League again the following August with Sutton United.

On 16 June 2026, Boutin was released by Bournemouth, and moved to Scotland, signing a pre-contract agreement with Scottish Championship side, Inverness Caledonian Thistle.
