= 2018–19 EFL Cup =

Carabao Cup, League Cup

Tournament details
- Country: England; Wales
- Dates: 14 August 2018 – 24 February 2019
- Teams: 92

Final positions
- Champions: Manchester City (6th title)
- Runners-up: Chelsea

Tournament statistics
- Matches played: 93
- Goals scored: 285 (3.06 per match)
- Attendance: 1,277,957 (13,741 per match)
- Top goal scorer(s): Gabriel Jesus (5 goals)

The 2018–19 EFL Cup was the 59th season of the EFL Cup. Also known as the Carabao Cup for sponsorship reasons, the competition was open to all 92 clubs participating in the Premier League and the English Football League. The first round was played on 14 August 2018, ten days after the start of the Football League season. Manchester City successfully defended their title, their first step in becoming the first English team to complete a domestic treble for the football season, as they later won the 2018–19 Premier League and the 2018–19 FA Cup. The final was held at Wembley Stadium in London on 24 February 2019.

== Format ==
In June 2018, it was announced that there would be a number of changes to the competition after a vote by all of the English Football League clubs at their annual EFL Summer Conference in Portugal. Extra time would be scrapped for all rounds except for the final with the tie progressing straight to a penalty shoot-out in the event of a draw after 90 minutes. This was introduced in order to reduce "additional fatigue issues". The ABBA penalty system trial would also be scrapped and the format for a penalty shoot-out would return to the ABAB format. Seeding was removed for the first two rounds however the first two rounds remained organised on a regional basis. Video assistant referees (VAR) were also authorised for use at matches played at Premier League club grounds.

== Access ==
All 92 clubs in the Premier League and English Football League entered the season's EFL Cup. Access was distributed across leagues.

In the first round, the draw was regionalised into northern and southern clubs with 22 Championship clubs and all League One and League Two clubs entering in this round.

The following round, the two remaining Championship clubs Swansea City and Stoke City (who finished 18th and 19th respectively in the 2017–18 Premier League season), and the Premier League clubs not involved in either the Champions League or Europa League entered.

Arsenal, Burnley, Chelsea, Liverpool, Manchester City, Manchester United and Tottenham Hotspur all received byes to the third round owing to their participation in European competitions.

The first round draw was held on 15 June 2018 in Vietnam. The second round draw was held on 16 August 2018 in England, drawn by Mick McCarthy and Chris Waddle.

	Clubs entering in this round	Clubs advancing from previous round	No of games
First round (70 clubs)	24 clubs from EFL League Two; 24 clubs from EFL League One; 22 clubs from EFL Championship	N/A	35
Second round (50 clubs)	2 clubs from EFL Championship; 13 Premier League clubs (not involved in European competition)	35 winners from first round	25
Third round (32 clubs)	7 Premier League clubs (involved in European competition)	25 winners from second round	16
Fourth round (16 clubs)	No other entries	16 winners from third round	8
Quarter-finals (8 clubs)	No other entries	8 winners from fourth round	4
Semi-finals (4 clubs)	No other entries	4 winners from quarter-finals	2 (over 2 legs each)
Final (2 clubs)	No other entries	2 winners from semi-finals	1

== First round ==
A total of 70 clubs played in the first round: 24 from League Two (tier 4), 24 from League One (tier 3), and 22 from the Championship (tier 2). The draw for this round was split on a geographical basis into 'northern' and 'southern' sections. Teams were drawn against a team from the same section. The draw was made on 15 June 2018.

=== Northern section ===
14 August 2018	Blackpool (3)	3–1	Barnsley (3)	Blackpool
19:45 BST	Nottingham 50'; Pritchard 56'; Gnanduillet 80'	Report	Moncur 19'	Stadium: Bloomfield Road; Attendance: 1,937; Referee: Mark Heywood

14 August 2018	Carlisle United (4)	1–5	Blackburn Rovers (2)	Carlisle
19:45 BST	Hope 22'	Report	Armstrong 2', 54'; Dack 6', 34'; Palmer 40'	Stadium: Brunton Park; Attendance: 3,156; Referee: Ross Joyce

14 August 2018	Crewe Alexandra (4)	1–1 (3–4 p)	Fleetwood Town (3)	Crewe
19:45 BST	Wintle 32'	Report	Holt 52'	Stadium: Gresty Road; Attendance: 1,783; Referee: Trevor Kettle
	Penalties
	Jones (penalty missed); Nicholls (penalty scored); Reilly (penalty scored); Pickering (penalty scored); Ng (penalty missed)		(penalty scored) Madden; (penalty scored) Long; (penalty scored) Holt; (penalty missed) Biggins; (penalty scored) Hunter

14 August 2018	Grimsby Town (4)	0–2	Rochdale (3)	Cleethorpes
19:45 BST		Report	Rathbone 39', 79'	Stadium: Blundell Park; Attendance: 1,781; Referee: Darren England

14 August 2018	Leeds United (2)	2–1	Bolton Wanderers (2)	Leeds
19:45 BST	Bamford 27'; Sáiz 35'	Report	Oztumer 52'	Stadium: Elland Road; Attendance: 19,617; Referee: Andy Haines

14 August 2018	Macclesfield Town (4)	1–1 (4–2 p)	Bradford City (3)	Macclesfield
19:45 BST	Kelleher 60'	Report	Colville 62'	Stadium: Moss Rose; Attendance: 1,422; Referee: Jeremy Simpson
	Penalties
	Whitaker (penalty scored); Smith (penalty missed); Fitzpatrick (penalty scored); Rose (penalty scored); Marsh (penalty scored)		(penalty missed) O'Connor; (penalty scored) Akpan; (penalty missed) Riley; (penalty scored) Payne

14 August 2018	Mansfield Town (4)	6–1	Accrington Stanley (3)	Mansfield
19:45 BST	Walker 9' (pen.), 13' (pen.), 45+2'; Khan 16'; Rose 66'; Hamilton 90+4'	Report	Finley 6'	Stadium: Field Mill; Attendance: 1,565; Referee: Sebastian Stockbridge

14 August 2018	Middlesbrough (2)	3–3 (4–3 p)	Notts County (4)	Middlesbrough
19:45 BST	Fletcher 27', 74'; Mahmutovic 44'	Report	Crawford 20'; Stead 34', 63'	Stadium: Riverside Stadium; Attendance: 9,942; Referee: Anthony Backhouse
	Penalties
	Leadbitter (penalty scored); McNair (penalty scored); Walker (penalty scored); Tavernier (penalty scored)		(penalty missed) Stead; (penalty scored) Alessandra; (penalty scored) Hawkridge; (penalty scored) Patching; (penalty missed) Jones

14 August 2018	Nottingham Forest (2)	1–1 (10–9 p)	Bury (4)	Nottingham
19:30 BST	Cash 90+3'	Report	O'Connell 2'	Stadium: City Ground; Attendance: 8,172; Referee: Scott Duncan
	Penalties
	Lolley (penalty scored); Osborn (penalty scored); Dawson (penalty scored); Murphy (penalty scored); Watson (penalty scored); Cash (penalty missed); Hefele (penalty scored); Robinson (penalty scored); Byram (penalty scored); Steele (penalty scored); Lolley (penalty scored)		(penalty scored) O'Connell; (penalty scored) O'Shea; (penalty scored) Bunn; (penalty scored) Omotayo; (penalty scored) Stokes; (penalty missed) Miller; (penalty scored) Moore; (penalty scored) Thompson; (penalty scored) Dawson; (penalty scored) Murphy; (penalty missed) O'Connell

14 August 2018	Oldham Athletic (4)	0–2	Derby County (2)	Oldham
19:45 BST		Report	Tomori 36'; Mount 70'	Stadium: Boundary Park; Attendance: 3,376; Referee: Darren Bond

14 August 2018	Port Vale (4)	0–4	Lincoln City (4)	Stoke-on-Trent
19:45 BST		Report	Shackell 5'; Green 48' (pen.); O'Connor 80'; Akinde 82'	Stadium: Vale Park; Attendance: 2,440; Referee: Robert Lewis

14 August 2018	Preston North End (2)	3–1	Morecambe (4)	Preston
19:45 BST	Barker 14'; Moult 33'; Burke 58'	Report	Mandeville 45+2'	Stadium: Deepdale; Attendance: 6,077; Referee: Tom Nield

14 August 2018	Rotherham United (2)	3–1	Wigan Athletic (2)	Rotherham
19:45 BST	Proctor 37', 64'; Ajayi 42'	Report	Vaughan 74'	Stadium: New York Stadium; Attendance: 3,017; Referee: Peter Bankes

14 August 2018	Scunthorpe United (3)	1–2	Doncaster Rovers (3)	Scunthorpe
19:45 BST	Humphrys 90+2'	Report	Wilks 36'; Andrew 56'	Stadium: Glanford Park; Attendance: 3,272; Referee: Geoff Eltringham

14 August 2018	Sheffield United (2)	1–1 (4–5 p)	Hull City (2)	Sheffield
19:45 BST	Sharp 75'	Report	Toral 18'	Stadium: Bramall Lane; Attendance: 6,327; Referee: Martin Coy
	Penalties
	Norwood (penalty missed); Sharp (penalty scored); Woodburn (penalty scored); O'Connell (penalty scored); Basham (penalty scored)		Toral (penalty scored); Keane (penalty scored); Grosicki (penalty scored); Fleming (penalty scored); Stewart (penalty scored)

14 August 2018	Shrewsbury Town (3)	1–2	Burton Albion (3)	Shrewsbury
19:45 BST	Whalley 27'	Report	Templeton 45'; Akins 64' (pen.)	Stadium: New Meadow; Attendance: 2,708; Referee: Graham Salisbury

14 August 2018	Tranmere Rovers (4)	1–3	Walsall (3)	Birkenhead
19:45 BST	Cole 80'	Report	Ferrier 29'; Ginnelly 64'; Ismail 68'	Stadium: Prenton Park; Attendance: 3,817; Referee: Michael Salisbury

16 August 2018	Sunderland (3)	0–2	Sheffield Wednesday (2)	Sunderland
19:45 BST		Report	Matias 29'; Reach 79'	Stadium: Stadium of Light; Attendance: 13,890

=== Southern section ===
14 August 2018	Bristol City (2)	0–1	Plymouth Argyle (3)	Bristol
19:45 BST		Report	Songo'o 27'	Stadium: Ashton Gate; Attendance: 9,865; Referee: Kevin Johnson

14 August 2018	Bristol Rovers (3)	2–1	Crawley Town (4)	Bristol
19:45 BST	Kyle Bennett 32'; Ollie Clarke 84'	Report	Mark Connolly 88'	Stadium: Memorial Stadium; Attendance: 2,336; Referee: Lee Swabey

14 August 2018	Cambridge United (4)	1–4	Newport County (4)	Cambridge
19:45 BST	Azeez 90' (pen.)	Report	Amond 18', 22'; Matt 49'; Semenyo 86'	Stadium: Abbey Stadium; Attendance: 1,618; Referee: Andrew Davies

14 August 2018	Cheltenham Town (4)	2–2 (6–5 p)	Colchester United (4)	Cheltenham
19:45 BST	Broom 1'; Thomas 71' (pen.)	Report	Szmodics 79'; Norris 80'	Stadium: Whaddon Road; Attendance: 1,179; Referee: Chris Sarginson
	Penalties
	Thomas (penalty scored); Tozer (penalty scored); Smith (penalty missed); Broom (penalty scored); Kalala (penalty scored); Mullins (penalty scored); Forster (penalty scored)		Norris (penalty missed); Pell (penalty scored); Szmodics (penalty scored); Nouble (penalty scored); Kent (penalty scored); Dickenson (penalty scored); Senior (penalty missed)

14 August 2018	Exeter City (4)	1–1 (4–2 p)	Ipswich Town (2)	Exeter
19:45 BST	Brown 64'	Report	Jackson 37'	Stadium: St James Park; Attendance: 3,675; Referee: Brett Huxtable
	Penalties
	Taylor (penalty missed); Sweeney (penalty scored); Abrahams (penalty scored); Collins (penalty scored); Martin (penalty scored)		Bishop (penalty missed); Chambers (penalty scored); Jackson (penalty scored); Chalobah (penalty missed)

14 August 2018	Millwall (2)	0–0 (3–1 p)	Gillingham (3)	Bermondsey, London
19:45 BST		Report		Stadium: The Den; Attendance: 4,401; Referee: Charles Brakespear
	Penalties
	J. Wallace (penalty missed); Elliott (penalty scored); Webster (penalty scored); Ferguson (penalty scored)		Byrne (penalty missed); O'Neill (penalty scored); Parker (penalty missed); Hanlan (penalty missed)

14 August 2018	Milton Keynes Dons (4)	3–0	Charlton Athletic (3)	Milton Keynes
19:45 BST	Asonganyi 7'; Watson 16'; Cummings 71' (o.g.)	Report		Stadium: Stadium MK; Attendance: 3,052; Referee: John Busby

14 August 2018	Norwich City (2)	3–1	Stevenage (4)	Norwich
19:45 BST	Stiepermann 27'; Zimmermann 83'; Pukki 89'	Report	Ball 40'	Stadium: Carrow Road; Attendance: 11,687; Referee: Craig Hicks

14 August 2018	Oxford United (3)	2–0	Coventry City (3)	Oxford
19:45 BST	Browne 39'; Whyte 50'	Report		Stadium: Kassam Stadium; Attendance: 3,551; Referee: James Linington

14 August 2018	Portsmouth (3)	1–2	AFC Wimbledon (3)	Portsmouth
19:45 BST	Burgess 49'	Report	Pigott 76'; Walkes 88' (o.g.)	Stadium: Fratton Park; Attendance: 6,588; Referee: Ollie Yates

14 August 2018	Queens Park Rangers (2)	2–0	Peterborough United (3)	Shepherd's Bush, London
19:45 BST	Freeman 3'; Wszołek 6'	Report		Stadium: Loftus Road; Attendance: 4,021; Referee: Gavin Ward

14 August 2018	Reading (2)	2–0	Birmingham City (2)	Reading
20:00 BST	Méïté 11'; Swift 72'	Report		Stadium: Madejski Stadium; Attendance: 6,934

14 August 2018	Southend United (3)	2–4	Brentford (2)	Southend-on-Sea
19:45 BST	Robinson 62'; McCoulsky 72'	Report	Forss 42'; Jeanvier 64'; Benrahma 67'; Mokotjo 85'	Stadium: Roots Hall; Attendance: 3,055

14 August 2018	Swindon Town (4)	0–1	Forest Green Rovers (4)	Swindon
19:45 BST		Report	Campbell 60'	Stadium: County Ground; Attendance: 3,451

14 August 2018	West Bromwich Albion (2)	1–0	Luton Town (3)	West Bromwich
20:00 BST	Burke 62'	Report		Stadium: The Hawthorns; Attendance: 10,404

14 August 2018	Wycombe Wanderers (3)	1–1 (7–6 p)	Northampton Town (4)	High Wycombe
19:45 BST	Williams 50'	Report	Hoskins 82'	Stadium: Adams Park; Attendance: 1,999
	Penalties
	Jacobson (penalty scored); Morris (penalty scored); McCarthy (penalty scored); Mackail-Smith (penalty missed); Kashket (penalty scored); Thompson (penalty scored); Gape (penalty scored); El-Abd (penalty scored)		Bowditch (penalty scored); Hoskins (penalty missed); Waters (penalty scored); Foley (penalty scored); Taylor (penalty scored); Bridge (penalty scored); Facey (penalty scored); Turnbull (penalty missed)

14 August 2018	Yeovil Town (4)	0–1	Aston Villa (2)	Yeovil
19:45 BST		Report	Hourihane 77'	Stadium: Huish Park; Attendance: 6,123

== Second round ==
A total of 50 clubs played in the second round with 13 teams from the Premier League joining in this round (teams without international liabilities), also the 2 remaining Championship teams entered. The draw for this round was split on a geographical basis into 'northern' and 'southern' sections. Teams were drawn against a team from the same section.

=== Northern section ===
28 August 2018	Leicester City (1)	4–0	Fleetwood Town (3)	Leicester
19:45 BST	Fuchs 8'; Iborra 39'; Iheanacho 46'; Ghezzal 71'	Report		Stadium: King Power Stadium; Attendance: 10,671; Referee: Lee Mason

28 August 2018	Leeds United (2)	0–2	Preston North End (2)	Leeds
19:45 BST		Report	Johnson 2' (pen.); Barker 45+1'	Stadium: Elland Road; Attendance: 18,652; Referee: Tony Harrington

28 August 2018	Sheffield Wednesday (2)	0–2	Wolverhampton Wanderers (1)	Sheffield
19:45 BST		Report	Bonatini 53'; Costa 85' (pen.)	Stadium: Hillsborough Stadium; Attendance: 13,597; Referee: Robert Jones

28 August 2018	Doncaster Rovers (3)	1–2	Blackpool (3)	Doncaster
19:45 BST	May 23'	Report	Nottingham 38'; Pritchard 60'	Stadium: Keepmoat Stadium; Attendance: 3,188; Referee: Anthony Backhouse

28 August 2018	Burton Albion (3)	1–0	Aston Villa (2)	Burton upon Trent
19:45 BST	Boyce 52'	Report		Stadium: Pirelli Stadium; Attendance: 3,411; Referee: Darren Bond

28 August 2018	Hull City (2)	0–4	Derby County (2)	Hull
19:45 BST		Report	Waghorn 24'; Jozefzoon 39'; Fleming 73' (o.g.); Mount 89'	Stadium: KCOM Stadium; Attendance: 4,666; Referee: Oliver Langford

28 August 2018	Middlesbrough (2)	2–1	Rochdale (3)	Middlesbrough
19:45 BST	Johnson 37'; Hugill 53'	Report	Delaney 83'	Stadium: Riverside Stadium; Attendance: 10,344; Referee: Ben Toner

28 August 2018	Blackburn Rovers (2)	4–1	Lincoln City (4)	Blackburn
19:45 BST	Nuttall 4'; Graham 49'; Downing 61'; Palmer 77'	Report	Luque 28'	Stadium: Ewood Park; Attendance: 5,211; Referee: Geoff Eltringham

28 August 2018	West Bromwich Albion (2)	2–1	Mansfield Town (4)	West Bromwich
19:45 BST	Leko 26'; Edwards 75'	Report	Bishop 69'	Stadium: The Hawthorns; Attendance: 13,046; Referee: Steve Martin

28 August 2018	Walsall (3)	3–3 (1–3 p)	Macclesfield Town (4)	Walsall
19:45 BST	Morris 33'; Cook 63'; Gordon 64'	Report	Grimes 10'; Smith 25'; Marsh 90+1'	Stadium: Bescot Stadium; Attendance: 2,352; Referee: Darren Drysdale
	Penalties
	Cook (penalty missed); Leahy (penalty missed); Kouhyar (penalty scored); Morris (penalty missed)		(penalty scored) Whitaker; (penalty scored) Smith; (penalty scored) Fitzpatrick

28 August 2018	Stoke City (2)	2–0	Huddersfield Town (1)	Stoke-on-Trent
19:45 BST	Berahino 53'; Bacuna 90+7' (o.g.)	Report		Stadium: Bet365 Stadium; Attendance: 7,290; Referee: Peter Bankes

29 August 2018	Everton (1)	3–1	Rotherham United (2)	Liverpool
19:45 BST	Sigurðsson 28'; Calvert-Lewin 61', 87'	Report	Vaulks 86'	Stadium: Goodison Park; Attendance: 31,972; Referee: Graham Scott

29 August 2018	Nottingham Forest (2)	3–1	Newcastle United (1)	Nottingham
19:45 BST	Murphy 2'; Cash 90+4'; Dias 90+7'	Report	Rondón 90+2'	Stadium: City Ground; Attendance: 13,942; Referee: Jeremy Simpson

=== Southern section ===
28 August 2018	Brighton & Hove Albion (1)	0–1	Southampton (1)	Brighton
19:45 BST		Report	Austin 88'	Stadium: Falmer Stadium; Attendance: 13,651; Referee: Andre Marriner

28 August 2018	Queens Park Rangers (2)	3–1	Bristol Rovers (3)	London
19:45 BST	Osayi-Samuel 4'; Wszołek 18'; Smith 64'	Report	Upson 87'	Stadium: Loftus Road; Attendance: 5,007; Referee: Charles Breakspear

28 August 2018	AFC Wimbledon (3)	1–3	West Ham United (1)	London
19:45 BST	Pigott 2'	Report	Diop 63'; Ogbonna 83'; Hernández 90+2'	Stadium: Kingsmeadow; Attendance: 3,962; Referee: Tim Robinson

28 August 2018	Fulham (1)	2–0	Exeter City (4)	London
19:45 BST	Kamara 4', 48'	Report		Stadium: Craven Cottage; Attendance: 9,333; Referee: Kevin Friend

28 August 2018	Wycombe Wanderers (3)	2–2 (4–3 p)	Forest Green Rovers (4)	High Wycombe
19:45 BST	Kashket 55'; Stewart 74'	Report	Grubb 57'; Winchester 86'	Stadium: Adams Park; Attendance: 1,934; Referee: Antony Coggins
	Penalties
	Jacobson (penalty scored); Freeman (penalty scored); McCarthy (penalty scored); Stewart (penalty scored); Saunders (penalty missed)		(penalty missed) Doidge; (penalty scored) Gunning; (penalty scored) Grubb; (penalty scored) Brown; (penalty missed) Digby

28 August 2018	Cardiff City (1)	1–3	Norwich City (2)	Cardiff
19:45 BST	Ecuele Manga 77'	Report	Srbeny 26', 64'; Aarons 69'	Stadium: Cardiff City Stadium; Attendance: 6,953; Referee: Andrew Madley

28 August 2018	Brentford (2)	1–0	Cheltenham Town (4)	London
19:45 BST	Jeanvier 40'	Report		Stadium: Griffin Park; Attendance: 4,384; Referee: Ross Joyce

28 August 2018	Swansea City (2)	0–1	Crystal Palace (1)	Swansea
19:45 BST		Report	Sørloth 70'	Stadium: Liberty Stadium; Attendance: 9,122; Referee: John Brooks

28 August 2018	Newport County (4)	0–3	Oxford United (3)	Newport
19:45 BST		Report	Demetriou 2' (o.g.); Baptiste 4'; Whyte 90+1'	Stadium: Rodney Parade; Attendance: 2,228; Referee: Scott Duncan

28 August 2018	Bournemouth (1)	3–0	Milton Keynes Dons (4)	Bournemouth
19:45 BST	Mousset 15'; Fraser 37'; Ibe 90+1'	Report		Stadium: Dean Court; Attendance: 9,747; Referee: James Linington

29 August 2018	Reading (2)	0–2	Watford (1)	Reading
20:00 BST		Report	Success 37'; Quina 62'	Stadium: Madejski Stadium; Attendance: 9,265; Referee: Andy Davies

29 August 2018	Millwall (2)	3–2	Plymouth Argyle (3)	London
19:45 BST	Williams 64' (pen.); Gregory 83'; O'Brien 89'	Report	Ness 41'; Ladapo 67'	Stadium: The Den; Attendance: 3,645; Referee: Darren England

== Third round ==
A total of 32 teams played in this round. The seven remaining Premier League clubs involved in European competition joined the 25 match-winners from the second round. The draw was held on 30 August 2018.

25 September 2018	West Bromwich Albion (2)	0–3	Crystal Palace (1)	West Bromwich
20:00 BST		Report	Townsend 6', 81'; Van Aanholt 76'	Stadium: The Hawthorns; Attendance: 10,818; Referee: Peter Bankes

25 September 2018	Burton Albion (3)	2–1	Burnley (1)	Burton-upon-Trent
19:45 BST	Boyce 62'; Allen 83'	Report	Long 40'	Stadium: Pirelli Stadium; Attendance: 2,449; Referee: Robert Jones

25 September 2018	Wycombe Wanderers (3)	3–4	Norwich City (2)	High Wycombe
19:45 BST	Cowan-Hall 17'; Saunders 61' (pen.); McCarthy 75'	Report	Rhodes 12', 14', 51'; Trybull 41'	Stadium: Adams Park; Attendance: 3,947; Referee: Jeremy Simpson

25 September 2018	Oxford United (3)	0–3	Manchester City (1)	Oxford
19:45 BST		Report	Gabriel Jesus 36'; Mahrez 78'; Foden 90+3'	Stadium: Kassam Stadium; Attendance: 11,956; Referee: Roger East

25 September 2018	Millwall (2)	1–3	Fulham (1)	London
19:45 BST	Elliott 61'	Report	Bryan 7'; De la Torre 52'; Christie 68'	Stadium: The Den; Attendance: 5,839; Referee: Darren Bond

25 September 2018	Bournemouth (1)	3–2	Blackburn Rovers (2)	Bournemouth
19:45 BST	Stanislas 14'; Ibe 58' (pen.); Wilson 90+5'	Report	Conway 63'; Armstrong 72' (pen.)	Stadium: Dean Court; Attendance: 9,715; Referee: Simon Hooper

25 September 2018	Preston North End (2)	2–2 (3–4 p)	Middlesbrough (2)	Preston
19:45 BST	Robinson 27'; Barkhuizen 66'	Report	Fletcher 34'; Tavernier 69'	Stadium: Deepdale; Attendance: 5,095; Referee: Oliver Langford
	Penalties
	Ledson (penalty scored); Robinson (penalty missed); Moult (penalty scored); Pearson (penalty scored); Burke (penalty missed)		(penalty scored) Leadbitter; (penalty scored) Gestede; (penalty scored) McNair; (penalty scored) Tavernier

25 September 2018	Wolverhampton Wanderers (1)	0–0 (1–3 p)	Leicester City (1)	Wolverhampton
19:45 BST		Report		Stadium: Molineux; Attendance: 21,562; Referee: Paul Tierney
	Penalties
	Saïss (penalty missed); Jota (penalty missed); Ashley-Seal (penalty scored); Traoré (penalty missed)		(penalty missed) Fuchs; (penalty scored) Ghezzal; (penalty missed) Choudhury; (penalty scored) Iborra; (penalty scored) Iheanacho

25 September 2018	Blackpool (3)	2–0	Queens Park Rangers (2)	Blackpool
19:45 BST	Gnanduillet 28'; Spearing 90+1'	Report		Stadium: Bloomfield Road; Attendance: 1,910; Referee: Tim Robinson

25 September 2018	Manchester United (1)	2–2 (7–8 p)	Derby County (2)	Old Trafford, Manchester
20:00 BST	Mata 3'; Fellaini 90+5'	Report	Wilson 59'; Marriott 85'	Stadium: Old Trafford; Attendance: 55,227; Referee: Stuart Attwell
	Penalties
	Lukaku (penalty scored); Young (penalty scored); Fellaini (penalty scored); Fred (penalty scored); Martial (penalty scored); Dalot (penalty scored); Matić (penalty scored); Jones (penalty missed)		(penalty scored) Mount; (penalty scored) Jozefzoon; (penalty scored) Wilson; (penalty scored) Marriott; (penalty scored) Johnson; (penalty scored) Bryson; (penalty scored) Forsyth; (penalty scored) Keogh

26 September 2018	Nottingham Forest (2)	3–2	Stoke City (2)	Nottingham
19:45 BST	Osborn 19'; Murphy 40'; Lolley 50'	Report	Afobe 60'; Berahino 83'	Stadium: City Ground; Attendance: 12,915; Referee: Darren England

26 September 2018	Arsenal (1)	3–1	Brentford (2)	Holloway, London
19:45 BST	Welbeck 5', 37'; Lacazette 90+3'	Report	Judge 58'	Stadium: Emirates Stadium; Attendance: 49,586; Referee: Mike Dean

26 September 2018	Liverpool (1)	1–2	Chelsea (1)	Liverpool
19:45 BST	Sturridge 58'	Report	Emerson 79'; Hazard 85'	Stadium: Anfield; Attendance: 45,503; Referee: Kevin Friend

26 September 2018	Tottenham Hotspur (1)	2–2 (4–2 p)	Watford (1)	Milton Keynes (Note: This match was moved to Stadium MK in Milton Keynes, as neither Wembley Stadium nor Tottenham Hotspur Stadium were available to host.)
20:00 BST	Alli 82'; Lamela 86'	Report	Success 46'; Capoue 89'	Stadium: Stadium MK; Attendance: 23,650; Referee: Lee Mason
	Penalties
	Son Heung-min (penalty scored); Lamela (penalty scored); Llorente (penalty scored); Alli (penalty scored)		(penalty scored) Success; (penalty missed) Capoue; (penalty scored) Hughes; (penalty missed) Quina

26 September 2018	West Ham United (1)	8–0	Macclesfield Town (4)	Stratford, London
19:45 BST	Antonio 29'; Snodgrass 32', 60'; Pérez 39'; Fredericks 51'; Ogbonna 54'; Diangana 67', 82'	Report		Stadium: London Stadium; Attendance: 24,833; Referee: Craig Pawson

2 October 2018	Everton (1)	1–1 (3–4 p)	Southampton (1)	Liverpool
19:45 BST	Walcott 85'	Report	Ings 44'	Stadium: Goodison Park; Attendance: 30,545; Referee: Chris Kavanagh
	Penalties
	Baines (penalty scored); Tosun (penalty scored); Richarlison (penalty missed); Zouma (penalty scored); Walcott (penalty missed)		(penalty scored) Ings; (penalty scored) Davis; (penalty scored) Højbjerg; (penalty missed) Targett; (penalty scored) Cédric

== Fourth round ==
The fourth round draw took place on 29 September 2018.

30 October 2018	Bournemouth (1)	2–1	Norwich City (2)	Bournemouth
19:45 GMT	Stanislas 39'; S. Cook 72'	Report	Hernández 70'	Stadium: Dean Court; Attendance: 10,331; Referee: Lee Mason

30 October 2018	Burton Albion (3)	3–2	Nottingham Forest (2)	Burton-upon-Trent
19:45 GMT	Janko 52' (o.g.); Fraser 64'; Hesketh 82'	Report	Grabban 70'; Appiah 90+1'	Stadium: Pirelli Stadium; Attendance: 4,284; Referee: John Brooks

31 October 2018	Arsenal (1)	2–1	Blackpool (3)	Holloway, London
19:45 GMT	Lichtsteiner 33'; Smith Rowe 50'	Report	O'Connor 66'	Stadium: Emirates Stadium; Attendance: 48,168; Referee: David Coote

31 October 2018	Chelsea (1)	3–2	Derby County (2)	Fulham
19:45 GMT	Tomori 5' (o.g.); Keogh 21' (o.g.); Fàbregas 41'	Report	Marriott 9'; Waghorn 27'	Stadium: Stamford Bridge; Attendance: 39,564; Referee: Jonathan Moss

31 October 2018	West Ham United (1)	1–3	Tottenham Hotspur (1)	Stratford, London
19:45 GMT	Pérez 71'	Report	Son Heung-min 16', 54'; Llorente 75'	Stadium: London Stadium; Attendance: 50,270; Referee: Stuart Attwell

31 October 2018	Middlesbrough (2)	1–0	Crystal Palace (1)	Middlesbrough
20:00 GMT	Wing 45+3'	Report		Stadium: Riverside Stadium; Attendance: 11,850; Referee: Paul Tierney

1 November 2018	Manchester City (1)	2–0	Fulham (1)	Manchester
19:45 GMT	Brahim 18', 65'	Report		Stadium: City of Manchester Stadium; Attendance: 35,271; Referee: Martin Atkinson

27 November 2018 (Note: This match was postponed on 28 October, following the 2018 Leicester helicopter crash and death of Leicester City's chairman Vichai Srivaddhanaprabha.)	Leicester City (1)	0–0 (6–5 p)	Southampton (1)	Leicester
19:45 GMT		Report		Stadium: King Power Stadium; Attendance: 22,150; Referee: Roger East
	Penalties
	Fuchs (penalty scored); Albrighton (penalty scored); Söyüncü (penalty scored); Gray (penalty scored); Vardy (penalty scored); Mendy (penalty scored)		(penalty scored) Davis; (penalty scored) Højbjerg; (penalty scored) Redmond; (penalty scored) Vestergaard; (penalty scored) Cédric; (penalty missed) Gabbiadini

== Quarter-finals ==
The quarter-final draw took place on 31 October and was made by Jamie Redknapp and Jimmy Floyd Hasselbaink.

18 December 2018	Leicester City (1)	1–1 (1–3 p)	Manchester City (1)	Leicester
19:45 GMT	Albrighton 73'	Report	De Bruyne 14'	Stadium: King Power Stadium; Attendance: 24,644; Referee: Lee Mason
	Penalties
	Maguire (penalty scored); Fuchs (penalty missed); Maddison (penalty missed); Söyüncü (penalty missed)		(penalty scored) Gündoğan; (penalty missed) Sterling; (penalty scored) Gabriel Jesus; (penalty scored) Zinchenko

18 December 2018	Middlesbrough (2)	0–1	Burton Albion (3)	Middlesbrough
19:45 GMT		Report	Hesketh 48'	Stadium: Riverside Stadium; Attendance: 17,342; Referee: Michael Oliver

19 December 2018	Arsenal (1)	0–2	Tottenham Hotspur (1)	Holloway, London
19:45 GMT		Report	Son 20'; Alli 59'	Stadium: Emirates Stadium; Attendance: 59,016; Referee: Jonathan Moss

19 December 2018	Chelsea (1)	1–0	Bournemouth (1)	Fulham, London
19:45 GMT	Hazard 84'	Report		Stadium: Stamford Bridge; Attendance: 40,432; Referee: Anthony Taylor

== Semi-finals ==
The semi-final draw took place on 19 December and was made by Peter Crouch and Piers Morgan.

=== First leg ===
8 January 2019	Tottenham Hotspur (1)	1–0	Chelsea (1)	Wembley, London
20:00 GMT	Kane 26' (pen.)	Report		Stadium: Wembley Stadium; Attendance: 44,371; Referee: Michael Oliver

9 January 2019	Manchester City (1)	9–0	Burton Albion (3)	Manchester
19:45 GMT	De Bruyne 5'; Gabriel Jesus 30', 34', 57', 65'; Zinchenko 37'; Foden 62'; Walker 70'; Mahrez 83'	Report		Stadium: City of Manchester Stadium; Attendance: 32,089; Referee: Mike Dean

=== Second leg ===
23 January 2019	Burton Albion (3)	0–1 (0–10 agg.)	Manchester City (1)	Burton upon Trent
19:45 GMT		Report	Agüero 26'	Stadium: Pirelli Stadium; Attendance: 6,519; Referee: Kevin Friend

24 January 2019	Chelsea (1)	2–1 (2–2 agg.) (4–2 p)	Tottenham Hotspur (1)	Fulham, London
19:45 GMT	Kanté 27'; Hazard 38'	Report	Llorente 50'	Stadium: Stamford Bridge; Attendance: 38,610; Referee: Martin Atkinson
	Penalties
	Willian (penalty scored); Azpilicueta (penalty scored); Jorginho (penalty scored); David Luiz (penalty scored)		(penalty scored) Eriksen; (penalty scored) Lamela; (penalty missed) Dier; (penalty missed) Lucas

== Final ==
The final was played at Wembley Stadium.

24 February 2019
16:30 GMT

Chelsea	0–0 (a.e.t.)	Manchester City
	Report
Penalties
Jorginho (penalty missed); Azpilicueta (penalty scored); Emerson (penalty scored); David Luiz (penalty missed); Hazard (penalty scored)	3–4	(penalty scored) Gündoğan; (penalty scored) Agüero; (penalty missed) Sané; (penalty scored) B. Silva; (penalty scored) Sterling

Wembley Stadium, London
Attendance: 81,775
Referee: Jon Moss (West Yorkshire)

== Broadcasting ==
These matches were televised live in the UK and Ireland by Sky Sports:

Round	Matches
First round	Yeovil Town vs Aston Villa, Sunderland vs Sheffield Wednesday
Second round	AFC Wimbledon vs West Ham United, Nottingham Forest vs Newcastle United
Third round	Manchester United vs Derby County, Liverpool vs Chelsea
Fourth round	Burton Albion vs Nottingham Forest, Chelsea vs Derby County
Quarter-finals	Leicester City vs Manchester City, Arsenal vs Tottenham Hotspur
Semi-finals	All games
Final	All games
