= Cedusa striata =

Scientific classification
- Kingdom: Animalia
- Phylum: Arthropoda
- Class: Insecta
- Order: Hemiptera
- Suborder: Auchenorrhyncha
- Infraorder: Fulgoromorpha
- Family: Derbidae
- Genus: Cedusa
- Species: C. striata

Binomial name
- Cedusa striata (Van Stalle, 1984)

Species of insect

Cedusa striata is a species of derbid in the genus Cedusa, first described by Van Stalle in 1984. The species is native to Nigeria.
