= List of Cedusa species =

These species belong to Cedusa, a genus of derbid planthoppers in the family Derbidae.

== Cedusa species ==
- Cedusa albolineata Fennah, 1952
- Cedusa alexanderi Flynn & Kramer, 1983
- Cedusa andara Kramer, 1986
- Cedusa angolensis (Van Stalle, 1984)
- Cedusa apicata Caldwell, 1944
- Cedusa arizonensis Flynn & Kramer, 1983
- Cedusa australis (Metcalf, 1923)
- Cedusa aziza Kramer, 1986
- Cedusa balli Flynn & Kramer, 1983
- Cedusa balloui Flynn & Kramer, 1983
- Cedusa beameri Flynn & Kramer, 1983
- Cedusa bedusa Mc Atee, 1924
- Cedusa belma Kramer, 1986
- Cedusa bicolor (Van Stalle, 1984)
- Cedusa blantoni Flynn & Kramer, 1983
- Cedusa bolopa Kramer, 1986
- Cedusa borneensis Muir, 1913
- Cedusa brachycara (Van Stalle, 1986)
- Cedusa brazilensis Flynn & Kramer, 1983
- Cedusa bruneri Flynn & Kramer, 1983
- Cedusa caldwelli Flynn & Kramer, 1983
- Cedusa californica (Van Duzee, 1891)
- Cedusa caribbensis Caldwell, 1950
- Cedusa carolinensis Flynn & Kramer, 1983
- Cedusa carranzensis Caldwell, 1944
- Cedusa carropia Kramer, 1986
- Cedusa catasia Kramer, 1986
- Cedusa cedusa Mc Atee, 1924
- Cedusa chuluota Ball, 1928
- Cedusa cocos (Van Stalle, 1984)
- Cedusa coerulea (Van Stalle, 1984)
- Cedusa colona Caldwell, 1950
- Cedusa complicata (Van Stalle, 1982)
- Cedusa consimilis (Van Stalle, 1984)
- Cedusa costaricensis Flynn & Kramer, 1983
- Cedusa cubensis Flynn & Kramer, 1983
- Cedusa cyanea Fennah, 1945
- Cedusa cydippe (Linnavuori, 1973)
- Cedusa dampfi Caldwell, 1944
- Cedusa delongi Caldwell, 1944
- Cedusa dietzi Flynn & Kramer, 1983
- Cedusa digitata Caldwell, 1944
- Cedusa dilbata Kramer, 1986
- Cedusa drilda Kramer, 1986
- Cedusa dubiata Caldwell, 1944
- Cedusa ecuadorensis Flynn & Kramer, 1983
- Cedusa edentula (Van Duzee, 1912)
- Cedusa edox Kramer, 1986
- Cedusa elongata Caldwell, 1944
- Cedusa enosala Kramer, 1986
- Cedusa exiqua (Van Stalle, 1984)
- Cedusa febora Kramer, 1986
- Cedusa fennahi Flynn & Kramer, 1983
- Cedusa fitchiella Flynn & Kramer, 1983
- Cedusa flava (Van Stalle, 1984)
- Cedusa flavescens (Van Stalle, 1984)
- Cedusa flavicephala (Van Stalle, 1984)
- Cedusa flavida (Van Duzee, 1907)
- Cedusa flynni Kramer, 1986
- Cedusa fowleri Flynn & Kramer, 1986
- Cedusa funesta Fowler, 1904
- Cedusa furcata Caldwell, 1944
- Cedusa furcifera (Van Stalle, 1984)
- Cedusa fuscata Caldwell, 1944
- Cedusa gedusa Mc Atee, 1924
- Cedusa gonuga Kramer, 1986
- Cedusa grancara Kramer, 1986
- Cedusa hampora Kramer, 1986
- Cedusa hedusa Mc Atee, 1924
- Cedusa hyola Kramer, 1986
- Cedusa impada Kramer, 1986
- Cedusa incisa (Metcalf, 1923)
- Cedusa inflata (Ball, 1902)
- Cedusa insularis Flynn & Kramer, 1983
- Cedusa irengana Fennah, 1944
- Cedusa isinara Kramer, 1986
- Cedusa isinica (Dlabola, 1986)
- Cedusa isthmusensis Flynn & Kramer, 1983
- Cedusa jacobii Jacobi, 1928
- Cedusa janola Kramer, 1986
- Cedusa jarata Kramer, 1986
- Cedusa jinwista Kramer, 1986
- Cedusa kalala Kramer, 1986
- Cedusa kedusa Mc Atee, 1924
- Cedusa kilisica (Dlabola, 1986)
- Cedusa kinoxa Kramer, 1986
- Cedusa kivuensis (Van Stalle, 1984)
- Cedusa kulashi Flynn & Kramer, 1983
- Cedusa kulia (Kirkaldy, 1906)
- Cedusa ledusa (Mc Atee, 1924)
- Cedusa licea (Dlabola, 1979)
- Cedusa lineata Caldwell, 1944
- Cedusa lugubrina (Stål, 1862)
- Cedusa lumeda Kramer, 1986
- Cedusa macateei Flynn & Kramer, 1983
- Cedusa maculata (Van Duzee, 1912)
- Cedusa maculosa (Van Duzee, 1912)
- Cedusa mallochi Mc Atee, 1924
- Cedusa marlota Kramer, 1986
- Cedusa martini Flynn & Kramer, 1983
- Cedusa masirica (Dlabola, 1986)
- Cedusa medusa Mc Atee, 1924
- Cedusa mesasiatica (Dubovskiy, 1965)
- Cedusa metcalfi Flynn & Kramer, 1983
- Cedusa mexicana Caldwell, 1944
- Cedusa minuenda Ball, 1928
- Cedusa minuta (Van Stalle, 1984)
- Cedusa montana (Van Stalle, 1984)
- Cedusa monticola (Van Stalle, 1984)
- Cedusa morrisoni Flynn & Kramer, 1983
- Cedusa muiri Flynn & Kramer, 1983
- Cedusa mutilata Caldwell, 1944
- Cedusa nedusa Caldwell, 1944
- Cedusa neodigitata Caldwell, 1944
- Cedusa neomaculata Caldwell, 1944
- Cedusa nortoma Kramer, 1986
- Cedusa noxora Kramer, 1986
- Cedusa obscura (Ball, 1902)
- Cedusa olasca Kramer, 1986
- Cedusa olseni Flynn & Kramer, 1983
- Cedusa ozda Kramer, 1986
- Cedusa pacuta Kramer, 1986
- Cedusa panamensis Flynn & Kramer, 1983
- Cedusa pedusa Mc Atee, 1924
- Cedusa peruensis Flynn & Kramer, 1983
- Cedusa pipsewa Kramer, 1986
- Cedusa plaumanni Flynn & Kramer, 1983
- Cedusa plummeri Caldwell, 1944
- Cedusa poochia Kramer, 1986
- Cedusa praecox (Van Duzee, 1912)
- Cedusa pseudomaculata Caldwell, 1944
- Cedusa pseudonigripes (Van Stalle, 1984)
- Cedusa quimata Kramer, 1986
- Cedusa quinteca Kramer, 1986
- Cedusa redusa Mc Atee, 1924
- Cedusa remettei Flynn & Kramer, 1983
- Cedusa reota Kramer, 1986
- Cedusa roseifrons (Kramer, 1986)
- Cedusa sanctaecatharinae Flynn & Kramer, 1983
- Cedusa senbara Kramer, 1986
- Cedusa serrata Caldwell, 1944
- Cedusa shawi Flynn & Kramer, 1983
- Cedusa similis Caldwell, 1944
- Cedusa simplex Flynn & Kramer, 1983
- Cedusa siopa Kramer, 1986
- Cedusa spinosa (Metcalf, 1945)
- Cedusa stali Flynn & Kramer, 1983
- Cedusa striata (Van Stalle, 1984)
- Cedusa tincta Caldwell, 1944
- Cedusa turkestanica (Dubovskiy, 1965)
- Cedusa tuvaga Kramer, 1986
- Cedusa ulora Kramer, 1986
- Cedusa unsera Kramer, 1986
- Cedusa ussurica (Anufriev, 1968)
- Cedusa uzama Kramer, 1986
- Cedusa vanduzeei Flynn & Kramer, 1983
- Cedusa varopa Kramer, 1986
- Cedusa vedusa Mc Atee, 1924
- Cedusa venosa Fowler, 1904
- Cedusa vidola Kramer, 1986
- Cedusa vulgaris (Fitch, 1851)
- Cedusa whitei Flynn & Kramer, 1983
- Cedusa widisca Kramer, 1986
- Cedusa wolcotti Muir, 1924
- Cedusa wontula Kramer, 1986
- Cedusa woodsholensis Flynn & Kramer, 1983
- Cedusa woodyga Kramer, 1986
- Cedusa xenga Kramer, 1986
- Cedusa xipola Kramer, 1986
- Cedusa xumara Kramer, 1986
- Cedusa yarosa Kramer, 1986
- Cedusa yipara Kramer, 1986
- Cedusa yowza Kramer, 1986
- Cedusa zantata Kramer, 1986
- Cedusa zaxoza Kramer, 1986
- Cedusa zedusa Caldwell, 1944
- Cedusa zeteki Flynn & Kramer, 1983
- † Cedusa baylissae Szwedo & Ross, 2003
- † Cedusa credula Emeljanov & Shcherbakov, 2000
