= Jordon Forster =

Scottish footballer

Personal information
- Full name: Jordon John Forster
- Date of birth: 23 September 1993 (age 33)
- Place of birth: Edinburgh, Scotland
- Height: 1.87 m (6 ft 2 in)
- Position: Defender

Youth career
- –2010: Celtic
- 2010–2012: Hibernian

Senior career*
Years	Team	Apps	(Gls)
2012–2017	Hibernian	79	(6)
2012	→ Berwick Rangers (loan)	10	(2)
2012–2013	→ East Fife (loan)	12	(0)
2016	→ Plymouth Argyle (loan)	12	(0)
2017–2019	Cheltenham Town	30	(1)
2019–2021	Dundee	26	(1)
2021–2023	Kelty Hearts	43	(2)
2023	Tranent Juniors	0	(0)
- * Club domestic league appearances and goals as of 23:11, 23 June 2023 (UTC)

Jordon John Forster (born 23 September 1993) is a Scottish professional footballer who plays as a defender. Forster has previously played for Hibernian, Berwick Rangers, East Fife, Plymouth Argyle, Cheltenham Town, Dundee and Kelty Hearts.

== Career ==
Forster was in the Celtic youth system, but moved to Hibernian in 2010 after he was advised by Celtic that he would be unlikely to earn a professional contract with them. Hibs loaned Forster to Berwick Rangers during the second half of the 2011–12 season. Forster and Hibs agreed a one-year contract in May 2012 and he was loaned to East Fife for the first part of the 2012–13 season.

Manager Pat Fenlon said that younger players, including Forster, would feature more in the 2013–14 season. Forster made his debut appearance for Hibs in a 2–1 win against Hearts on 12 May 2013. Fenlon praised the way that Forster had dealt with the physical presence that Hearts had in their attacking line. Forster also played in the 2013 Scottish Cup Final defeat by Celtic, replacing injured captain James McPake. He signed a new one-year contract with Hibs in June 2013. Six months later, Forster signed a contract with Hibs that is due to run until 2016.

On 12 January 2016, Forster moved on loan to Football League Two side Plymouth Argyle until the end of the season. After returning from Plymouth, Forster signed a two-year contract with Hibernian in July 2016. He helped them win the 2016–17 Scottish Championship and promotion to the Premiership.

Seeking more regular first team appearances, Forster moved to EFL League Two club Cheltenham Town in July 2017.

In June 2019, Forster signed with Dundee on a two-year deal with an option of a further year. He featured often early on in his first season, but frequent mistakes eventually cost him his place in the team for a while. Upon his return to the first team and forming a back 3 partnership with Christophe Berra and Josh Meekings, Forster quickly became a key player in for Dundee, helping the side to 5 consecutive clean sheets, as well as his first goal for the Dark Blues away to Queen of the South on 22 February 2020. The team's momentum was unfortunately cut short however by the COVID-19 pandemic. Forster would leave the club in April 2021.

In May 2021, Forster signed with Scottish League Two side Kelty Hearts. He would score his first goal for the club in a league match against Stirling Albion, and would score an own goal in the same game. Forster would be on the pitch for Kelty when they were confirmed as League Two champions.

On 7 June 2023, Forster signed for Lowland League club Tranent Juniors. On 22 June, following public backlash after Forster had pleaded guilty to domestic abuse charges involving a former partner, Tranent announced that they had terminated his contract with immediate effect.

== Career statistics ==
=== Club ===
As of 14 January 2023

Appearances and goals by club, season and competition
Club	Season	League			Cup		League Cup		Other		Total	
Club	Season	Division	Apps	Goals	Apps	Goals	Apps	Goals	Apps	Goals	Apps	Goals
Hibernian	2011–12	Scottish Premier League	0	0	0	0	0	0	0	0	0	0
Hibernian	2012–13	Scottish Premier League	3	0	1	0	0	0	0	0	4	0
Hibernian	2013–14	Scottish Premiership	26	4	2	0	0	0	2 (Note: Appearances in the Europa League)	0	30	4
Hibernian	2014–15	Scottish Championship	17	1	1	0	2	0	1 (Note: Appearances in the Scottish Challenge Cup)	0	21	1
Hibernian	2015–16	Scottish Championship	0	0	0	0	0	0	1	0	1	0
Hibernian	2016–17 (Note: Soccerbase did not record an appearance made by Forster against Brondby IF on 21 July 2016.)	Scottish Championship	16	0	3	1	1	0	3 (Note: Two appearances in the Scottish Challenge Cup and one in the Europa League)	0	23	1
Hibernian	Total		62	5	7	1	3	0	7	0	79	6
Berwick Rangers (loan)	2011–12	Scottish Third Division	10	2	0	0	0	0	0	0	10	2
East Fife (loan)	2012–13	Scottish Second Division	12	0	0	0	0	0	0	0	12	0
Plymouth Argyle (loan)	2015–16	League Two	12	0	0	0	0	0	1 (Note: Appearance in the League Two play-offs)	0	13	0
Cheltenham Town	2017–18	League Two	4	0	0	0	2	0	0	0	6	0
Cheltenham Town	2018–19	League Two	26	1	3	0	1	0	5 (Note: Appearances in the EFL Trophy)	0	35	1
Cheltenham Town	Total		30	1	3	0	3	0	5	0	41	1
Dundee	2019–20	Scottish Championship	23	1	0	0	4	0	0	0	27	1
Dundee	2020–21	Scottish Championship	3	0	1	0	1	0	0	0	5	0
Dundee	Total		26	1	1	0	5	0	0	0	32	1
Kelty Hearts	2021–22	Scottish League Two	23	2	3	0	3	0	0	0	29	2
Kelty Hearts	2022–23	Scottish League One	20	0	1	0	3	0	4	0	28	0
Kelty Hearts	Total		43	2	4	0	6	0	4	0	57	2
Career total			195	11	15	1	17	0	17	0	244	12

== Honours ==
Hibernian

- Scottish Championship: 2016–17

Kelty Hearts

- Scottish League Two: 2021–22
