= Eric Kalala =

Congolese businessman

Eric Kalala Nsantu is a Congolese transportation and logistics executive who has been the chief executive officer of Bolloré Transport & Logistics in the Democratic Republic of the Congo since January 2019. In May 2023, Kalala was appointed by the Congolese president as head of Entreprise Générale de Cobalt (EGC), a subsidiary of Gecamines, and the world’s largest producer of cobalt.

== Education ==
Kalala received his university degree in business engineering at the Administration and Management Institute of Université catholique de Louvain from 1997 until 2002. Thereafter, he attended the prestigious HEC Paris for his master's degree in International Management, completing the course in 2003. Additionally, Kalala is also a graduate of the General Management Program diploma from Harvard Business School, which he completed in 2016.

== Career ==
Kalala began his career at Bollore in 2003. After holding various positions in the Finance and Operations Division, in 2012, he was promoted as head of the Katanga region, the Democratic Republic of Congo's richest province that produces 60 percent of the annual government revenue.

In January 2019, Kalala was promoted to the position of Chief Executive Officer, replacing Yves Debiesme who retired. Since the beginning of his tenure, Kalala has created over 100 jobs within the company, oversaw a steady increase in revenue in one of the most important landlocked countries in Africa, and expanded annual exports to over 400,000 tons of goods per year.

In August 2021, Éric Kalala Nsantu was appointed CEO of Bolloré Transport & Logistics.

In May 2023, Kalala became head of Entreprise Générale de Cobalt (EGC), the world’s largest producer of cobalt. In this role, he will oversee the establishment and maintenance of safe and strictly controlled artisanal cobalt mining zones in the Democratic Republic of the Congo (DRC), where the company would purchase, process and sell cobalt produced by artisanal miners or companies involved in artisanal and small-scale mining.

== Personal life ==
Kalala is married to Nadine Tshiamala since 2005. Together, they have three children and currently reside in Kinshasa, in the neighborhood of Ngaliema.
