= Matt Bower =

English footballer

Personal information
- Full name: Matthew Joseph Bower
- Date of birth: 11 December 1998 (age 27)
- Place of birth: Cheltenham, England
- Height: 1.98 m (6 ft 6 in)
- Position: Defender

Team information
- Current team: Yate Town

Youth career
- –2010: Charlton Rovers
- 2010–2016: Cheltenham Town

Senior career*
Years	Team	Apps	(Gls)
2016–2019	Cheltenham Town	5	(0)
2016	→ Cirencester Town (loan)	10	(0)
2018	→ Weston-super-Mare (loan)	17	(1)
2019	→ Weston-super-Mare (loan)	5	(1)
2019–2020	Bath City	7	(0)
2019	→ Stratford Town (loan)	11	(0)
2020	Cinderford Town	7	(0)
2020–	Yate Town	?	(?)
- * Club domestic league appearances and goals as of 07:30 10 Aug 2021 (UTC)

Matt Bower (born 11 December 1998) is an English professional footballer who plays as a defender for Yate Town.

== Club career ==
Bower joined Cheltenham Town in 2010, and signed his first professional deal in July 2016 following the Robins promotion back to the Football League. Prior to this, Bower made his first-team debut for Cheltenham during their FA Trophy tie against Oxford City, replacing Cian Harries in their 2–2 draw. Bower also enjoyed a short-term loan spell at Cirencester Town between March and April 2016, where he featured ten times for the Southern League Premier Division side. On 19 August 2017, Bower made his League Two debut for Cheltenham during their 3–0 away defeat against Carlisle United, replacing Will Boyle in the 85th minute. After playing in a trial game for Stoke City in late September he then signed a new contract for the 2018–19 season on 6 February.

On 28 June 2019, Bower joined Bath City on a one-year contract. On 15 October 2019, he was loaned out to Stratford Town. On 30 January 2020, he joined Cinderford Town.

On 28 July 2020 he signed for Yate Town.

== Career statistics ==
As of match played 5 May 2018.

Appearances and goals by club, season and competition
Club	Season	League			FA Cup		EFL Cup		Other		Total	
Club	Season	Division	Apps	Goals	Apps	Goals	Apps	Goals	Apps	Goals	Apps	Goals
Cheltenham Town	2015–16	National League	0	0	0	0	—		2 (Note: Appearance(s) in FA Trophy)	0	2	0
Cheltenham Town	2016–17	League Two	0	0	0	0	0	0	0	0	0	0
Cheltenham Town	2017–18	League Two	3	0	0	0	0	0	2 (Note: Appearance(s) in EFL Trophy)	0	5	0
Cheltenham Town	Total		3	0	0	0	0	0	4	0	7	0
Cirencester Town (loan)	2015–16	Southern League Premier Division	10	0	0	0	—		0	0	10	0
Career total			13	0	0	0	0	0	4	0	17	0
