= Archie Brennan =

English footballer

Personal information
- Full name: Archie Noel Brennan
- Date of birth: 16 October 2000 (age 26)
- Place of birth: Gloucester, England
- Position: Midfielder

Team information
- Current team: Cirencester Town

Youth career
- Brockworth
- Abbeymead Rovers
- 2008–2018: Cheltenham Town

Senior career*
Years	Team	Apps	(Gls)
2018–2020	Cheltenham Town	0	(0)
2018	→ Lydney Town (loan)	3	(0)
2019	→ Slimbridge (loan)	12	(0)
2019	→ Alvechurch (loan)		
2020–	Cirencester Town		
- * Club domestic league appearances and goals as of 16:43, 5 September 2020 (UTC)

Archie Noel Brennan (born 16 October 2000) is an English professional footballer who plays as a midfielder for Cirencester Town.

== Career ==
Brennan joined Cheltenham Town at under-9 level, previously playing for Brockworth and Abbeymead Rovers. In May 2019, Brennan signed a professional contract with Cheltenham, after playing on loan for non-league sides Lydney Town and Slimbridge during the 2018–19 season, making three and twelve appearances respectively. On 3 September 2019, Brennan made his Cheltenham debut in a 1–0 EFL Trophy defeat against Exeter City.

In October 2019, Brennan moved on loan to Worcestershire-based side Alvechurch.
