= Kalvin Lumbombo-Kalala =

French footballer (born 1998)

Personal information
- Date of birth: 16 February 1998 (age 28)
- Place of birth: Paris, France
- Height: 1.84 m (6 ft 0 in)
- Position: Winger

Team information
- Current team: Taunton Town
- Number: 18

Youth career
- Boulogne-Billancourt

Senior career*
Years	Team	Apps	(Gls)
2016–2017	Jolly Montemurlo	17	(0)
2017	Carpi	0	(0)
2017	→ Savona (loan)	26	(3)
2018	Cheltenham Town	7	(0)
2018–2020	Torquay United	63	(12)
2021	Entente Feignies Aulnoye	6	(0)
2021–2022	Dartford	21	(4)
2022–2023	Dulwich Hamlet	3	(0)
2023–2024	Lewes	38	(14)
2024–2025	Chelmsford City	20	(1)
2025	Carshalton Athletic	6	(0)
2025–	Taunton Town	1	(0)
- * Club domestic league appearances and goals as of 17:10, 7 May 2025 (UTC)

Kalvin Lumbombo-Kalala (born 16 February 1998) is a French footballer who plays as a winger for Taunton Town.

== Career ==
Born in Paris, Kalala played for Boulogne-Billancourt, before moving to Italy to sign for Jolly Montemurlo, Carpi and Savona.

He signed for English club Cheltenham Town in August 2018, making his debut on 4 August 2018. On 5 October 2018, Kalala left Cheltenham after his contract was cancelled by mutual consent.

On 11 October 2018, Kalala signed for Torquay United of the National League South on a contract until January 2019; Torquay manager Gary Johnson had also been Kalala's manager at Cheltenham. He scored his first Torquay United goal with the opener against Winchester City on 20 October 2018 in a 4–1 FA Cup qualifying match victory. Kalala scored his first league goals for Torquay with a brace in a 3–0 win at Hampton & Richmond on 22 December 2018. In January 2019, Kalala signed an extension to his Torquay contract, believed to be until May 2020. On 27 April 2019, Kalala scored the fastest goal in Torquay United history, scoring after ten seconds in a 4–0 win against St Albans City. He left the club at the end of the 2019–20 season, with Torquay announcing that they would be seeking compensation if he signed for another club as he was under 24.

In July 2021, he underwent a trial with German club FSV Zwickau. He later returned to France and signed for Entente Feignies Aulnoye.

He returned to England in December to play with Dartford. On 22 June 2022, it was confirmed that Kalala had left Dartford.

On 13 July 2022, it was announced that Kalala had signed for Dulwich Hamlet after a successful trial. He signed for Lewes on 9 August 2023.

On 18 June 2024, Kalala signed for Chelmsford City.

On 27 March 2025, Kalala joined Isthmian League side Carshalton Athletic.

On 10 September 2025, Kalala joined Taunton Town.

== Personal life ==
Born in France, Kalala is of Congolese descent.

== Career statistics ==
As of 26 April 2025.

Appearances and goals by club, season and competition
Club	Season	League			National Cup		League Cup		Other		Total	
Club	Season	Division	Apps	Goals	Apps	Goals	Apps	Goals	Apps	Goals	Apps	Goals
Jolly Montemurlo	2016–17	Serie D	17	0	0	0	0	0	0	0	17	0
Carpi	2016–17	Serie B	0	0	0	0	0	0	0	0	0	0
Carpi	2017–18	Serie B	0	0	0	0	0	0	0	0	0	0
Carpi	Total		0	0	0	0	0	0	0	0	0	0
Savona (loan)	2016–17	Serie D	10	2	0	0	0	0	2 (Note: Two appearances in the Serie D Play-Off.)	0	12	2
Savona (loan)	2017–18	Serie D	16	1	0	0	0	0	0	0	17	1
Savona (loan)	Total		26	3	0	0	0	0	2	0	28	3
Cheltenham Town	2018–19	League Two	7	0	0	0	1	0	1 (Note: One appearance in the EFL Trophy.)	0	9	0
Torquay United	2018–19	National League South	31	9	2	1	0	0	1 (Note: One appearance in the FA Trophy.)	0	33	10
Torquay United	2019–20	National League	32	3	1	0	0	0	0	0	33	3
Torquay United	Total		63	12	3	1	0	0	1	0	67	13
Entente Feignies Aulnoye	2021–22	Championnat National 3 Group I	6	0	1	0	0	0	0	0	7	0
Dartford	2021–22	National League South	21	4	0	0	0	0	5 (Note: Two appearances in the FA Trophy.) (Note: Two appearances in the London Senior Cup) (Note: One appearance in the National League South Play-Offs)	1	26	5
Dulwich Hamlet	2022–23	National League South	3	0	0	0	0	0	0	0	3	0
Lewes	2023–24	Isthmian League Premier Division	38	14	3	2	0	0	2 (Note: Two appearances in the FA Trophy.)	0	43	16
Chelmsford City	2024–25	National League South	20	1	1	0	0	0	1 (Note: One appearance in the FA Trophy.)	0	22	1
Carshalton Athletic	2024–25	Isthmian League Premier Division	6	0	0	0	0	0	0	0	6	0
Taunton Town	2025–26	Southern Premier League	1	0	0	0	0	0	0	0	1	0
Career total			208	34	8	3	1	0	12	1	229	38
