= Kalala Island =

Island in Zambia

Kalala Island is the southernmost island on the Kafue River in the Itezhi-Tezhi region. The Island retained a small permanent population throughout antiquity.

== Environment and wild fauna ==
The island lays between two different ecological zones, on the western bank lies the northern edge of the Puku flats and dambo wetlands. The flats and wetlands support populations of large and small game. The eastern bank of the Kafue features a miombo woodlands.

Archeological evidence shows that Kalala Island has had a consistently large Wild Micromammal populations from prehistory to today, consisting primarily of several taxa of bovids, warthogs, bushpigs, and zebras.

== Iron Age settlements and excavations ==
Much of the initial archaeological excavations at Kalala Island were conducted on the island's highest point, this point is not a naturally occurring hill but rather a manmade mound created by successive layers of human settlements. The settlements were made up of several circular daga style structures made of mud and grass. Radiocarbon dating has shown that the earliest settlements on the island date back to around 770 ad during the Middle Iron Age.

Excavations found a total of 8 burials, some dating to the mid 18th century, in almost all of them the deceased were buried along with ceremonial items such as iron bands and glass beads.

=== Stone tools ===
Excavations found that iron-age inhabitants of Kalala island used large pink granite grindstones and grinders with smooth and concave working surfaces. Aside from grindstones, the inhabitants also crafted hammerstones out of quartzite and quartz, pitted anvils out of granite, and pitted stones out of granite.

=== Glass beads ===
The inhabitants of Kalala island used beads as jewelry and for ornamental purposes. The majority of the beads were snapped off from large canes to facilitate mass production. Some beads were reheated to smooth their surface after the snapping process. Most Kalala island beads were an opaque red on the outside and a translucent green on the inside, however white, blues, and other reds were common as well.
