= Jean-Philippe Omotunde =

Guadeloupean writer

Nioussérê Kalala Omotunde
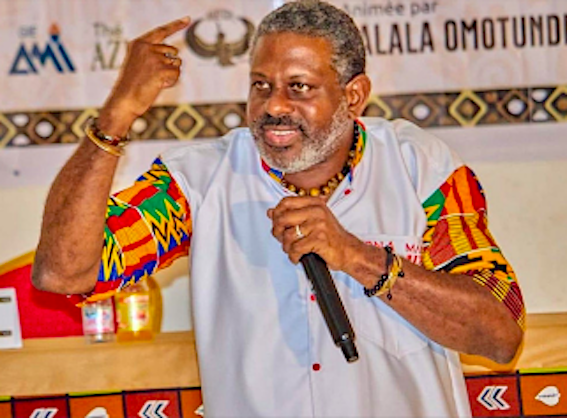
- Born: Jean-Philippe Corvo c. 1967
- Died: 14 November 2022 (aged 55); Guadeloupe
- Education: École de publicité de Paris
- Occupation: Writer
- Known for: African classical humanities, African mathematics, and sciences
- Notable work: Anyjart

Nioussérê Kalala Omotunde, born Jean-Philippe Corvo, (19 July 1967 – 14 November 2022) was a Guadeloupean independent writer. He founded the Anyjart Institute of African History based in Guadeloupe, as well as satellite institutes in Canada, Guyana, Martinique, and Haiti. Omotunde was also a Project Manager at UNESCO, and was influenced by Cheikh Anta Diop.

== Biography ==
Omotunde earned a degree from the École de publicité de Paris and became a teacher at the Institut Africamaat. He made an appearance at the UNESCO event "Africa Week" on 22 May 2017 with the theme "Investing in African Youth through Mathematics".

Omotunde rejected his French name to affirm his African roots, taking the name Nioussérê Kalala Omotunde, with Egyptian and Congolese roots. In December 2000, the Regional Council of Île-de-France paid Street Spirit Culture 650,000 CFA francs to organize a Hip-Hop World Cup in Paris.

As head of the Héliopolis association, Omotunde organized a commemoration of the 154th anniversary of the Proclamation of the Abolition of Slavery in the French Colonies in Garges-lès-Gonesse in the presence of deputy Dominique Strauss-Kahn and mayor Nelly Olin. He expressed his attachment to republican values at the festivities, which took place between the two rounds of the 2002 French presidential election.

Omotunde's works were favored towards Afrocentricité, which sought to counteract the philosophy of Négritude, put forth by Léopold Sédar Senghor and Aimé Césaire.

Nioussérê Kalala Omotunde died in Guadeloupe on 14 November 2022, at the age of 55.

== Publications and Media ==
- L'origine négro-africaine du savoir grec (2000)
- La traite négrière européenne: vérité & mensonges (2003)
- Les racines africaines de la civilisation européenne. (2004)
- Les racines africaines de la civilisation européenne. Volume 2 (2004)
- Discours afrocentriste sur l'aliénation culturelle (2006)
- Les humanités classiques africaines pour les enfants: Volume 1 (2006)
- Initiation aux humanités classiques africaines pour les enfants de 7 à 17 ans et + (2006)
- Manuel d'études des humanités classiques africaines (2007)
- Histoire de l'esclavage: critique du discours eurocentriste (2008)
- Qu'est-ce qu'être Kamit(e)? (2010)
- L'Afrique Noire : Initiatrice des législateurs antiques (2014)
- Le Papyrus D'Ahmès (2015)
- Cosmogénèse Kamite - Tome 1 (2015)
- Cosmogénèse Kamite - Tome 2 (2015)
- La Monnaie au temps des Pharaons: Une antéoriorité africaine (2016)
- Cosmogénèse Kamite - Fascicule (2018)
- Pélasgia - L'histoire Africaine de l'Europe (2020)

He never studied formally any subject of his publications and was never peer-reviewed.
