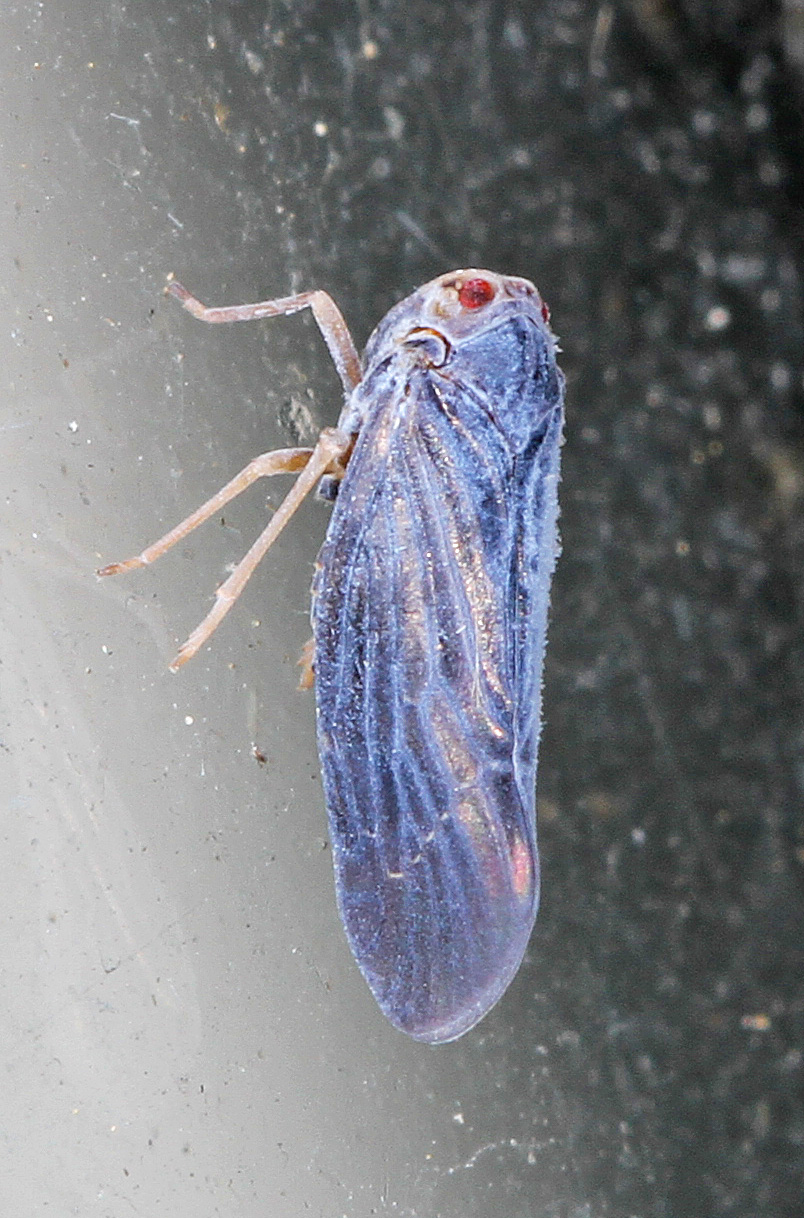
- Cedusa, Virginia

Scientific classification
- Domain: Eukaryota
- Kingdom: Animalia
- Phylum: Arthropoda
- Class: Insecta
- Order: Hemiptera
- Suborder: Auchenorrhyncha
- Infraorder: Fulgoromorpha
- Family: Derbidae
- Tribe: Cedusini
- Genus: Cedusa; Fowler, 1904

Diversity
- at least 170 species

= Cedusa =

Genus of true bugs

Cedusa is a genus of derbid planthoppers in the family Derbidae. There are more than 170 described species in Cedusa.

Around 114 of the species are found in North, Central, and South America. Those species found in Africa may actually be members of the genus Malenia.

== See also ==
- List of Cedusa species
