= AC Boulogne-Billancourt (football) =

- Full name: Athletic Club de Boulogne-Billancourt
- Nickname: ACBB
- Founded: 1943; 83 years ago
- Stadium: Stade Alphonse Le Gallo; Stade Marcel Bec; Parc sportif du Pré Saint-Jean
- Capacity: Le Gallo: 3,000 (500 seated)
- Manager: Quentin Thoreau
- League: Régional 2, Ligue Paris-Ile-de-France, Group D
- 2022–23: Régional 2, Paris-Île-de-France, Group D, 9th of 12th
- Website: https://www.acbbfoot.com/

AC Boulogne-Billancourt shortened ACBB is a French association football club based in Boulogne-Billancourt. Playing his matches in many grounds, including Stade Alphonse Le Gallo or Stade Marcel Bec. ACBB completes in Régional 2 of Ligue Paris-Ile-de-France, the seventh level of French football league system and is managed by Quentin Thoreau.

== History ==
ACBB were founded in 1942.

=== Promotion to national level (2014–2018) ===
In 2014, ACBB were promoted in CFA 2, the next year, the club was promoted in CFA.

Between 2015 and 2019, ACBB spent these seasons in Championnat National 2, achieving their remaining in each season.

=== Back to regional level (2018–present) ===
At the end of the 2018–19 Championnat National 2, ACBB were relegated to National 3.

Beginning in March 2020, the club could no longer played matches due to the COVID-19 pandemic in France which affected all French competitions. On 28 April 2020, the Prime Minister Édouard Philippe announced the end of sports competitions in France, and as a result the ACBB was relegated to Régional 1.

The 2021–22 season is considered the worst season for ACBB due to poor results performances, without be able to perform a win for 2021, who resulted as a sackment of the manager, despite the recruitment of a new manager, the club cannot afford to win. On 14 May 2022, ACBB were relegated to Régional 2 after a 0–2 loss against CO Vincennes.

For their 2022–23 season, despite starting by a 8–3 away win against Sucy-en-Brie, ACBB will down in the next fixtures, falling in the relegation zone because of poor results. However, ACBB won many league matches in 2023 and escaped from a terrible relegation to Régional 3 by finished ninth, with three points above the first relegable, Francoville.

== Players ==
=== Seniors ===
As of 21 September 2024

Note: Flags indicate national team as defined under FIFA eligibility rules; some limited exceptions apply. Players may hold more than one non-FIFA nationality.

| No. | Pos. | Nation | Player |
|---|---|---|---|
| 1 | GK | FRA | Adem Boussif |
| 12 | GK | FRA | Arnaud Guilbert |
| 31 | GK | FRA | Louis Pouplard |
| 41 | GK | FRA | Rémy Lecomte |
| — | DF | FRA | Mathis Kissanga |
| — | DF | FRA | Gaston Westhingolo |
| — | DF | FRA | Tristan Envuli |
| — | DF | FRA | Jeffrey Manzongani |
| — | DF | FRA | Uche Ozazuwa |
| — | DF | FRA | Tom Faral |
| — | DF | FRA | Julien Afronso |
| — | DF | FRA | Wael Zehhar |
| — | DF | FRA | Lassana Dembélé |
| — | DF | FRA | Karim Doumbia |
| — | MF | FRA | Oumar Wané |

| No. | Pos. | Nation | Player |
|---|---|---|---|
| — | MF | FRA | Nathan Durand |
| — | MF | FRA | Pierre Potel |
| — | MF | FRA | Emile Sireau |
| — | MF | FRA | Grégory Soupramanien |
| — | MF | FRA | Soufian Redissi |
| — | MF | FRA | Guillaume Ebongue |
| — | FW | CIV | Wilfried Tagbo |
| — | FW | FRA | Sounkalo Traoré |
| — | FW | FRA | Dan Maurizi |
| — | FW | FRA | Corentin Barreteau |
| — | FW | FRA | Kylian Dossat |
| — | FW | FRA | Abdou Karim Dramé |
| — | FW | FRA | Sabri Haddadou |
| — | FW | FRA | Abdoulaye Haidara |
| — | FW | FRA | Loïc Assen A Zang |

=== Young system ===
==== U18 ====
As of 25 October 2024

Note: Flags indicate national team as defined under FIFA eligibility rules; some limited exceptions apply. Players may hold more than one non-FIFA nationality.

| No. | Pos. | Nation | Player |
|---|---|---|---|
| 1 | GK | FRA | Malo Boleda |
| 12 | GK | FRA | Romain Peridelle |
| 31 | GK | FRA | Malik Marrakchi |
| — | | FRA | Abdoulaye Sackhone |
| — | | FRA | Ziyad Nazar |
| — | | FRA | Envel Amardeilh |
| — | | FRA | Hadi Kleit |
| — | | FRA | Thomas Caban |
| — | | ISL | Sverrir Ögmundsson |
| — | | FRA | Sonko Moustapha |
| — | | FRA | Samuel de Almeida |
| — | | FRA | Rayan Afilal |
| — | | FRA | Rafaël Guerin |
| — | | FRA | Mathieu Oulouma |
| — | | FRA | Mathis Tulasne |
| — | | FRA | Mouhamed Mboup |
| — | | FRA | Muhammad Beego |
| — | | FRA | Noab Belhari |
| — | | FRA | Patrick Ngalle Mouelle |

| No. | Pos. | Nation | Player |
|---|---|---|---|
| — | | FRA | Kyllian Briandet |
| — | | FRA | Mael Quince |
| — | | FRA | Lorvens Racine |
| — | | FRA | Leyri Diawara |
| — | | FRA | Lenny Edo |
| — | | FRA | Julein Ruiz Castro |
| — | | FRA | Erwan Zadi |
| — | | FRA | Ekollo Noham Lewis |
| — | | FRA | Cheickne Deme |
| — | | FRA | Adan Boutoustous |
| — | | FRA | Amene Kridane |
| — | | FRA | Aylan Baha |
| — | | FRA | Balthazar Louis Entraygues |
| — | | FRA | Balthazar Wiberg |
| — | | FRA | Chadrak Kone |
| — | | FRA | Adam Boulahna |
| — | | FRA | Adam Bidja |
| — | | FRA | Labib Aatman |
| — | | FRA | Samuel Aman |
| — | | FRA | Nathan Joret |

== Seasons ==
=== Key ===
This section is a list of ACBB seasons.

Key to league record:

- P – Played
- W – Games won
- D – Games drawn
- L – Games lost
- F – Goals for
- A – Goals against
- Pts – Points
- Pos – Final position

Key to colours and symbols:

| 1st or W | Winners |
| 2nd or F | Runners-up |
| ↑ | Promoted |
| ↓ | Relegated |

Key to divisions:

- N2– National 2
- N3– National 3
- R1– Régional 1
- R2– Régional 2

Key to stages of competitions:

- R1 - First round
- R2 - Second round
- R3 - Third round
- R4 - Fourth round
- R5 - Fifth round
- R6 - Sixth round
- R7 - Seventh round
- R8 - Eighth round
- R64 - Round of 64
- R32 - Round of 32
- R16 – Round of 16
- QF – Quarter-final
- SF – Semi-final
- F – Runners-up
- W – Winners
- (A, B, C) – Group section of regionalised stage

=== List ===
List of seasons, including league division and statistics, cup results, and top league scorer(s)
| Season | League | Group | Level | Results | | | | | | | | | Coupe de France | Coupe de Paris-Île-de-France |
| Season | League | Group | Level | P | W | D | L | F | A | Diff. | Pts | Pos | Coupe de France | Coupe de Paris-Île-de-France |
|---|---|---|---|---|---|---|---|---|---|---|---|---|---|---|
| 2014–15 ↑ | CFA 2 | Group C | 5 | 26 | 15 | 2 | 9 | 51 | 39 | +12 | 73 | 1st | - | DNP |
| 2015–16 | CFA | Group A | 4 | 30 | 10 | 2 | 12 | 43 | 40 | +3 | 68 | 10th | R6 | DNP |
| 2016–17 | CFA | Group B | 4 | 30 | 15 | 4 | 11 | 48 | 42 | +6 | 49 | 4th | - | DNP |
| 2017–18 | National 2 | Group D | 4 | 30 | 9 | 10 | 11 | 44 | 58 | -14 | 34 | 13th | - | DNP |
| 2018–19 ↓ | National 2 | Group C | 4 | 30 | 8 | 5 | 17 | 36 | 51 | -15 | 29 | 15th | - | DNP |
| 2019–20 ↓ | National 3 - Paris-IDF | - | 5 | 18 | 2 | 6 | 10 | 8 | 29 | -21 | 7 | 14th | - | DNP |
| 2020–21 | Régional 1 - Paris-IDF | Group B | 6 | 6 | 0 | 0 | 4 | 2 | 7 | -5 | 0 | 14th | - | - |
| 2021–22 ↓ | Régional 1 - Paris-IDF | Group B | 6 | 26 | 2 | 7 | 17 | 18 | 44 | -26 | 13 | 14th | R4 | SF |
| 2022–23 | Régional 2 - Paris-IDF | Group B | 7 | 27 | 8 | 3 | 11 | 39 | 44 | -5 | 22 | 9th | R2 | - |

== Grounds ==
AC Boulogne-Billancourt have many grounds due to high amount of squads, it includes: Veterans, Seniors, Young sector, Women and their reserves.

=== Stade Alphonse Le Gallo ===
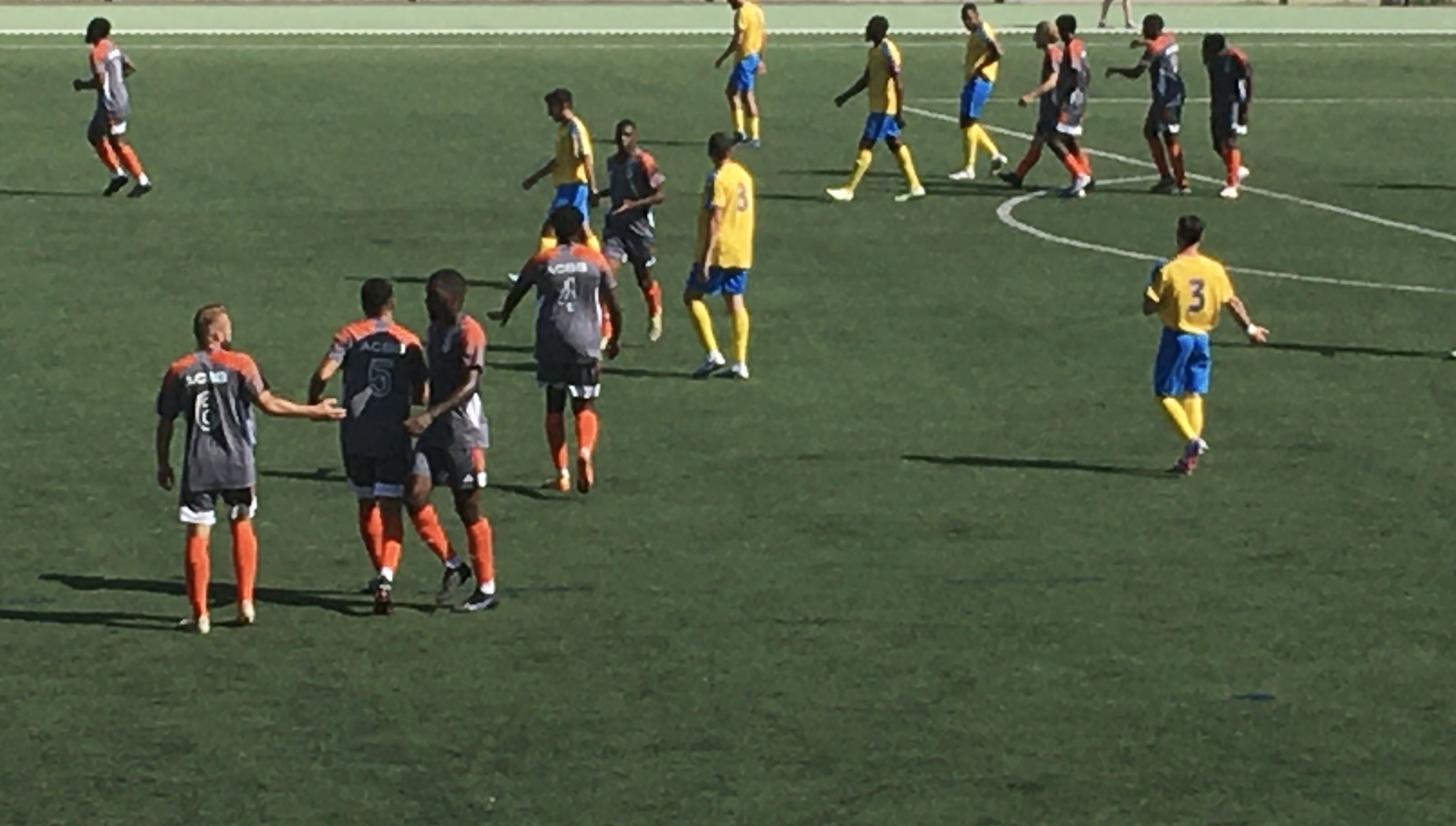
ACBB v. JS Suresnes during 2023–24 Régional 2, Paris-IDF, Group D season

Stade Alphonse Le Gallo is located at Rue de Sèvres, Boulogne-Billancourt.

The ground is connected with RATP bus route, 467 at Stade, remotely with routes 52 72 126 160 175 260 at Rhin-et-Danube and Paris Métro station, Boulogne–Pont de Saint-Cloud with line,

=== Complexe sportif de Marcel Bec ===
Complexe sportif de Marcel Bec is located at Meudon, Due to high amount of senior and youth sector teams played on Saturdays/Sundays, AC Boulogne-Billancourt played these matches at Complexe Sportif de Marcel Bec, this ground is split with other Hauts-de-Seine association football sides.

This ground is along with Stade Alphonse Le Gallo' one of many grounds mostly used for matches of ACBB, but this ground is also used when Stade Alphonse Le Gallo is unavailable due to technical incidents, renovation or due to a neutral venue of another association football side, likely in 2010s while the stadium was renovated with an expansion of the capacity or during the 2023–24 Championnat National 2 season, when RC France moved to Boulogne-Billancourt due to renovation of their main groundn Stade Yves du Manoir.

This ground is connected with RATP bus route 569 or TIM , and remotely with 179 at Rond-point des Bruyères.

=== Parc sportif du Pré Saint-Jean ===
Parc sportif du Pré Saint-Jean is located at Saint-Cloud, the ground is rarely used.

This ground is connected with 471 at Parc du Pré Saint-Jean.

=== Other teams ===
==== Youth Sector ====
ACBB have a Youth Sector composed of high amount of Under-18, Under-17, Under-16, Under-15 and Under-14 teams, the number of teams is variable according the seasons. the club is also one of the best Development team, many players pass through the academy/youth sector for achieve high experience before their departure for other French or European association football teams.

===== U18 =====
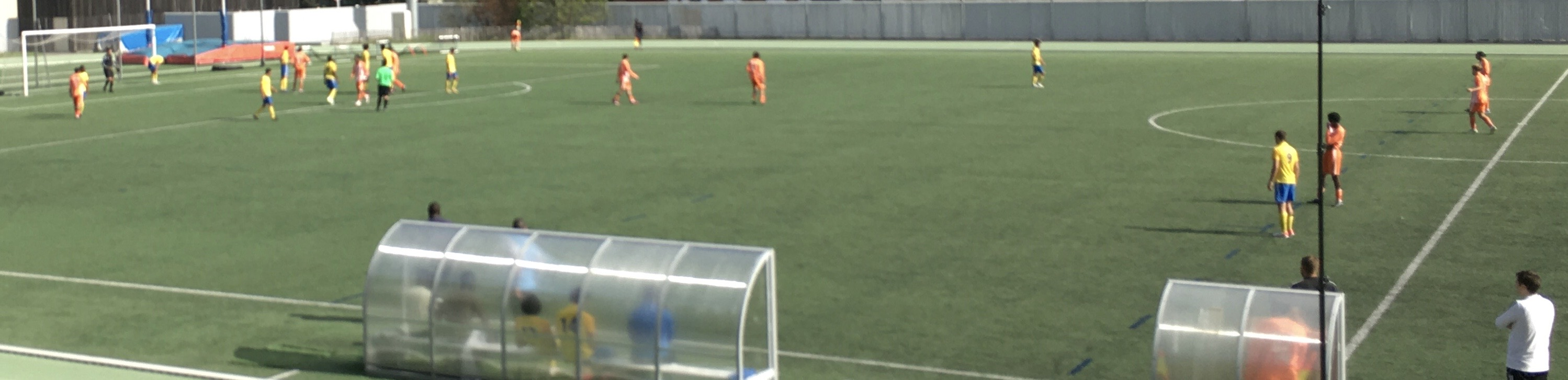
ACBB Under-18's side playing against US Fontenay-sous-Bois during a U18 Régional 3 match.

ACBB Under-18s is an under-18 team of AC Boulogne-Billancourt. Two squads are engaged for the 2024–25 season.

- The first U18 squad completes the Régional 3 and Coupe de Paris-Île-de-France de football organized by Ligue de Paris-Île-de-France, it also completes the Coupe Gambardella.
- The reserve U18 squad completes the Départemental 1 and Coupe des Hauts-de-Seine organized by District des Hauts-de-Seine.

===== U16 =====
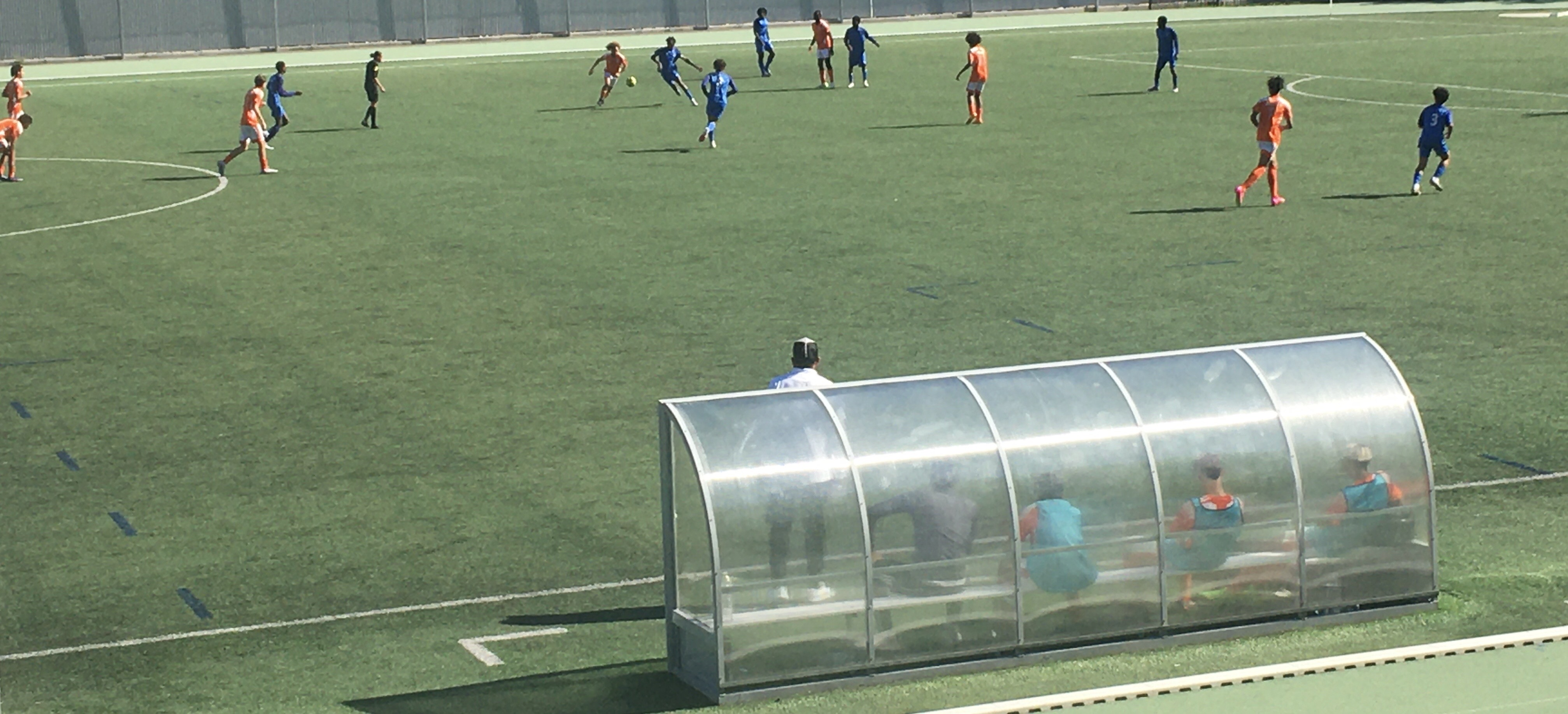
ACBB Under-16's side playing against Sénart-Moissy during a U16 Régional 1 match.

ACBB Under-16s is an under-16 team of the club. Four teams are engaged for the 2024–25 season.

- The first and reserve squads completes respectively the Régional 1, Régional 3 and Coupe de Paris-Île-de-France de football organized by Ligue de Paris-Île-de-France.
- The third and fourth squads completes respectively the Départemental 2, Départemental 3 and Coupe des Hauts-de-Seine of District des Hauts-de-Seine.

The first squad has previously playing for the Championnat National U17, consisting of under-17 players prior suffering a relegation to U16 Régional 1 at the end of the 2021–22 season.

===== U14 =====
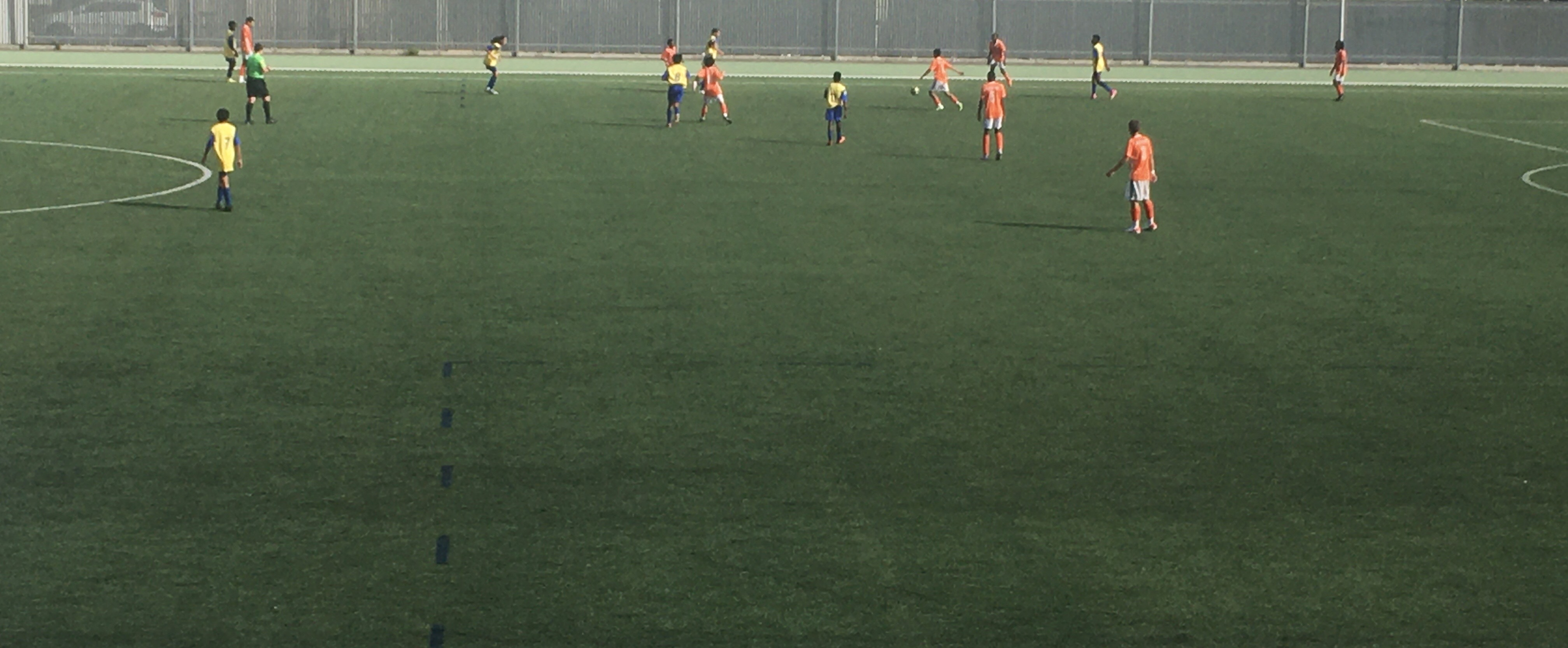
ACBB Under-14's side playing against Entente SSG during a U14 Régional 2 match.

ACBB Under-14s is an under-14 team at the club. Six teams are engaged for the 2024–25 season.

- The first squad is the only under-14 team who play in the Ligue de Paris-Île-de-France, completing the Régional 2 and Coupe de Paris-Île-de-France. The five other teams completes in the District des Hauts-de-Seine.

===== U13 and below =====
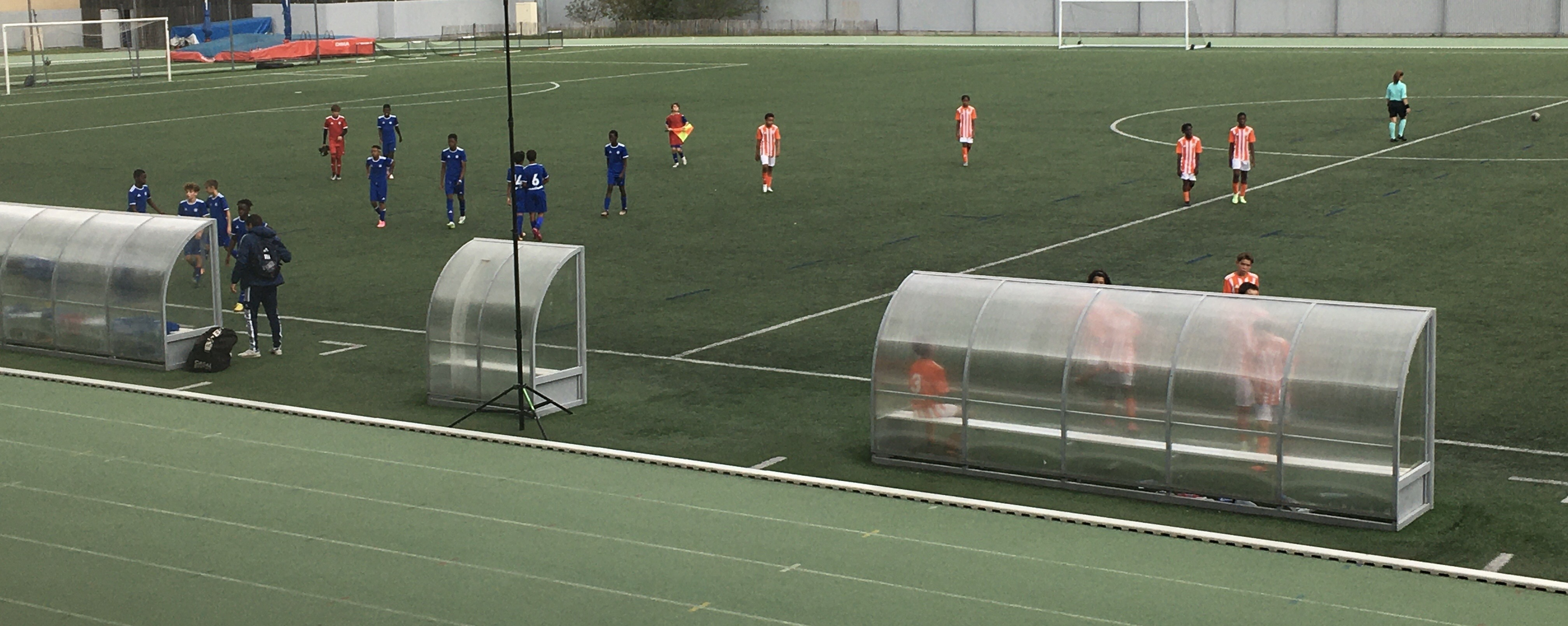
ACBB Under-13's side playing against FC Versailles during a U13 Criterium Interdépartemental match.

ACBB's Academy is the academy of AC Boulogne-Billancourt, consisting of Under-13s to Under-6s teams, completing the Critérium, Plateaux or Challenges organized by Ligue de Paris-Île-de-France or District des Hauts-de-Seine.

=== Women ===
==== Seniors ====
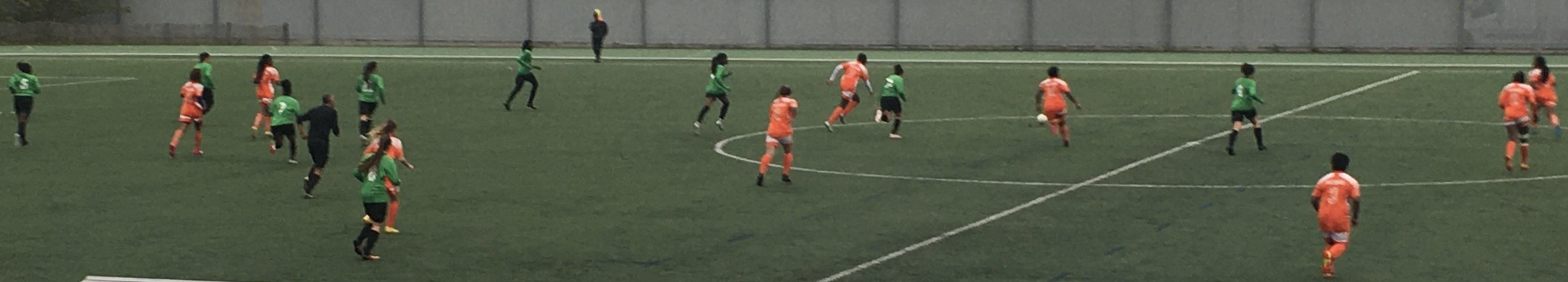
ACBB Women playing against Paris 13 Atletico Women during a Régional 3 match hosted by Ligue de Paris-Île-de-France

AC Boulogne-Billancourt also operate a women's football team including their women's academy, founded in the mid-2010s, completing in the Régional 3, Coupe de Paris-Île-de-France Féminine hosted by Ligue de Paris-Île-de-France, Coupe de France Féminine hosted by Fédération Française de Football, ACBB Women also completes Coupe des Hauts-de-Seine Féminine due to lack of teams.

Due to lack of sides in Hauts-de-Seine, ACBB Women who completes in Régional 3, Paris-Île-de-France is allow to be engaged in the Coupe des Hauts-de-Seine Féminine, they reached three times in a row the final between 2022 and 2024, facing Départemental 1 sides, losing 0–1 against FC Rueil-Malmaison Women 2 in 2022. winning 4–3 against GPSO 92 Issy 3 in 2023. and 1–0 against RC France in 2024.

On November 2, 2024, AC Boulogne-Billancourt advanced for the first of their history at first round proper of the Coupe de France féminine after defeating Mitry-Compans Goëlly on penalties.

==== Young sector ====
AC Boulogne-Billancourt also operates a women's development academy with Under-18s, Under-15s, Under-13s, Under-11s and 8-a-side.

In 2024, Under-18s were crowned champions of Régional 3, Ligue Paris-Île-de-France, granting a promotion to Régional 2.
