= 2017–18 Ipswich Town F.C. season =

Ipswich Town
2017–18 season
- Owner: Marcus Evans
- Manager: Mick McCarthy (left 10 April 2018); Bryan Klug (caretaker) (from 10 April 2018)
- Stadium: Portman Road
- Championship: 12th
- FA Cup: Third round
- EFL Cup: Second round
- Top goalscorer: League: Martyn Waghorn (16); All: Martyn Waghorn (16)
- Highest home attendance: 24,928 (vs Norwich City, 22 Oct 17, EFL Championship)
- Lowest home attendance: 12,057 (vs Sheffield United, 6 Jan 18, FA Cup)
- Average home league attendance: 16,272
Home colours	Away colours	Third colours

The 2017–18 season was Ipswich Town's 16th consecutive season in the second tier of English football and 140th year in existence. Along with competing in the Championship, the club also participated in the FA Cup and League Cup.

The season covers the period from 1 July 2017 to 30 June 2018.

== Kits ==
Supplier: Adidas / Sponsor: Marcus Evans Group (chest), East Anglian Children's Hospices (back)

Home	Away	Away alt.1	Away alt.2	Third

== First-team squad ==
Note: Flags indicate national team as defined under FIFA eligibility rules; some limited exceptions apply. Players may hold more than one non-FIFA nationality.

No.	Pos.	Nation	Player
1	GK	ENG	Dean Gerken
2	DF	ENG	Dominic Iorfa (on loan from Wolverhampton Wanderers)
3	DF	DEN	Jonas Knudsen
4	DF	ENG	Luke Chambers (captain)
6	DF	ENG	Adam Webster
7	MF	ENG	Teddy Bishop
8	MF	ENG	Cole Skuse (vice-captain)
9	FW	ENG	Martyn Waghorn
10	FW	IRL	David McGoldrick
11	MF	KOS	Bersant Celina (on loan from Manchester City)
12	DF	ENG	Jordan Spence
14	FW	ENG	Joe Garner
15	MF	ENG	Tom Adeyemi
16	DF	ENG	Callum Connolly (on loan from Everton)

No.	Pos.	Nation	Player
18	MF	ENG	Grant Ward
19	MF	ENG	Luke Hyam
20	FW	ENG	Freddie Sears
22	MF	ENG	Tristan Nydam
23	MF	ENG	Andre Dozzell
24	GK	WAL	Michael Crowe
25	MF	IRL	Stephen Gleeson
27	DF	USA	Cameron Carter-Vickers (on loan from Tottenham Hotspur)
28	MF	MRI	Kévin Bru
30	DF	ENG	Myles Kenlock
32	MF	GAM	Mustapha Carayol
33	GK	POL	Bartosz Białkowski
44	MF	WAL	Emyr Huws

=== Left club during season ===
Note: Flags indicate national team as defined under FIFA eligibility rules; some limited exceptions apply. Players may hold more than one non-FIFA nationality.

No.	Pos.	Nation	Player
5	DF	NZL	Tommy Smith (To Colorado Rapids)
17	MF	ENG	Danny Rowe (Loaned to Lincoln City)

No.	Pos.	Nation	Player
21	MF	ENG	Flynn Downes (Loaned to Luton Town)

== First-team coaching staff ==
Position	Name
Manager	(Republic of Ireland) Mick McCarthy
Assistant Manager	(England) Terry Connor
Goalkeeping Coach	(England) Malcolm Webster
Fitness Coach	(Scotland) Andy Liddell
Head Physiotherapist	(England) Matt Byard
Assistant Head Physiotherapist	(England) Alex Chapman
Kitman	(England) James Pullen

== Pre-season ==
On 10 May 2017, Ipswich Town announced a pre-season friendly against Charlton Athletic. The club confirmed Peterborough United as a second confirmed pre-season fixture, with the match split into two games of 60 minutes each. Mick McCarthy's men will travel to Republic of Ireland for a week and play Drogheda United whilst on tour. Colchester United were also confirmed for pre-season opposition. Four days later, Gillingham was added to the list of oppositions to face.

8 July 2017	Drogheda United	0–5	Ipswich Town	Drogheda, Ireland
14:00 IST		Report	Pitman 14'; Sears 37', 40'; Moore 47'; Garner 87'	Stadium: United Park

12 July 2017	Ipswich Town	4–1	Southend United	Ipswich
15:00 BST	Garner x2' Sears; McKendry	Report	Trialist	Stadium: Playford Road

18 July 2017	Peterborough United	1–3	Ipswich Town	Peterborough
19:00 BST (120 min match)	Marriott	Report	McGoldrick; Garner x2'	Stadium: ABAX Stadium

22 July 2017	Gillingham	2–1	Ipswich Town	Gillingham
15:00 BST	Eaves 53' (pen.); Wagstaff 78'	Report	Rowe 80'	Stadium: Priestfield Stadium

25 July 2017	Colchester United	0–1	Ipswich Town	Colchester
19:30 BST		Report	Garner 57'	Stadium: Weston Homes Community Stadium

29 July 2017	Charlton Athletic	6–1	Ipswich Town	Charlton
15:00 BST	Bauer 11'; Fosu 27'; Magennis 31', 39'; Holmes 51', 77'	Report	Dozzell 73'	Stadium: The Valley

== Competitions ==
=== EFL Championship ===
==== League table ====
Pos	Team	Pld	W	D	L	GF	GA	GD	Pts
10	Sheffield United	46	20	9	17	62	55	+7	69
11	Bristol City	46	17	16	13	67	58	+9	67
12	Ipswich Town	46	17	9	20	57	60	−3	60
13	Leeds United	46	17	9	20	59	64	−5	60
14	Norwich City	46	15	15	16	49	60	−11	60

Source: English Football League
Rules for classification: 1) Points; 2) Goal difference; 3) Number of goals scored

==== Result summary ====
Overall								Home						Away					
Pld	W	D	L	GF	GA	GD	Pts	W	D	L	GF	GA	GD	W	D	L	GF	GA	GD
46	17	9	20	57	60	−3	60	9	6	8	29	27	+2	8	3	12	28	33	−5

Last updated: 23 April 2019.

==== Results by matchday ====
Matchday	1	2	3	4	5	6	7	8	9	10	11	12	13	14	15	16	17	18	19	20	21	22	23	24	25	26	27	28	29	30	31	32	33	34	35	36	37	38	39	40	41	42	43	44	45	46
Ground	H	A	A	H	H	A	H	A	H	H	A	H	A	A	H	A	H	A	A	H	A	H	A	H	H	A	H	A	H	A	H	A	H	A	A	H	H	A	A	H	A	H	A	H	A	H
Result	W	W	W	W	L	L	W	L	W	L	L	L	W	L	W	D	D	L	W	W	L	W	L	D	L	L	W	D	L	W	D	D	L	W	W	D	L	L	L	D	L	W	L	L	W	D
Position	5	4	3	2	2	4	5	6	5	8	10	11	10	11	8	9	9	10	9	7	9	8	10	10	11	12	11	12	12	12	12	13	13	13	12	12	12	12	12	13	14	12	12	14	13	12

Source: Statto.com
A = Away; H = Home; W = Win; D = Draw; L = Loss

==== Matches ====
On 21 June 2017, the league fixtures were announced.

5 August 2017 1	Ipswich Town	1–0	Birmingham City	Ipswich
15:00 BST	Spence (yellow card) 48'; Garner 50'	Report	Roberts (yellow card) 90'	Stadium: Portman Road; Attendance: 18,153; Referee: Tim Robinson

12 August 2017 2	Barnsley	1–2	Ipswich Town	Barnsley
15:00 BST	Jackson (yellow card) 47'; Bradshaw 15'	Report	Iorfa (yellow card) 52'; McGoldrick 53'; Waghorn 70'	Stadium: Oakwell; Attendance: 12,009; Referee: Geoff Eltringham

15 August 2017 3	Millwall	3–4	Ipswich Town	Bermondsey
19:45 BST	Wallace 1'; O'Brien 36'; Elliott 80'	Report	Garner 4'; Waghorn 34', 45+3'; Spence 88'	Stadium: The Den; Attendance: 11,919; Referee: James Linington

19 August 2017 4	Ipswich Town	2–0	Brentford	Ipswich
15:00 BST	Kenlock (yellow card) 80'; Waghorn 35'; Garner 51'	Report	Sawyers (yellow card) 40'; Maupay (yellow card) 45+3'	Stadium: Portman Road; Attendance: 15,348; Referee: Oliver Langford

26 August 2017 5	Ipswich Town	0–2	Fulham	Ipswich
15:00 BST	Iorfa (yellow card) 31'	Report	Kebano 35'; Fonte 51'	Stadium: Portman Road; Attendance: 16,844; Referee: Paul Tierney

9 September 2017 6	Queens Park Rangers	2–1	Ipswich Town	Shepherd's Bush
15:00 BST	Mackie 43'; Freeman 49' (yellow card) 90'	Report	Downes (yellow card) 34'; Celina 89'; Connolly (yellow card) 90+4'	Stadium: Loftus Road; Attendance: 14,060; Referee: Andy Davies

12 September 2017 P	Derby County	P–P	Ipswich Town	Derby
19:45 BST				Stadium: Pride Park Stadium
Note: Match postponed on 31 August due to Derby County's second round EFL Cup match against Barnsley being moved to the same date.

16 September 2017 7	Ipswich Town	2–0	Bolton Wanderers	Ipswich
15:00 BST	Skuse 48'; McGoldrick 89'; Garner (yellow card) 90+3'	Report	Madine (yellow card) 48'; Wheater (yellow card) 67'; Noone (yellow card) 82'	Stadium: Portman Road; Attendance: 14,164; Referee: Andy Madley

23 September 2017 8	Leeds United	3–2	Ipswich Town	Leeds
15:00 BST	Lasogga 13'; Phillips 32'; Białkowski 67' (o.g.)	Report	McGoldrick 30'; Garner 71'	Stadium: Elland Road; Attendance: 34,002; Referee: Geoff Eltringham

26 September 2017 9	Ipswich Town	5–2	Sunderland	Ipswich
19:45 BST	Waghorn 6'; Spence 27'; Celina 55'; McGoldrick 60'; Nydam (yellow card) 85'; Ward 89'	Report	Jones 10'; Vaughan (yellow card) 44'; McGeady 65', (yellow card) 67'	Stadium: Portman Road; Attendance: 14,907; Referee: Tim Robinson

30 September 2017 10	Ipswich Town	1–3	Bristol City	Ipswich
15:00 BST	Knudsen (yellow card) 17'; Waghorn 41'; Garner (yellow card) 81'	Report	Brownhill 2'; Bryan (yellow card) 28'; Diedhiou 31'; Reid 82', (yellow card) 88'	Stadium: Portman Road; Attendance: 15,256; Referee: Simon Hooper

14 October 2017 11	Sheffield United	1–0	Ipswich Town	Sheffield
15:00 BST	Clarke (yellow card) 33'; Basham 49'; Carter-Vickers (yellow card) 90+1'	Report	Knudsen (yellow card) 69'	Stadium: Bramall Lane; Attendance: 25,799; Referee: Tony Harrington

22 October 2017 12	Ipswich Town	0–1	Norwich City	Ipswich
12:00 BST	Spence (yellow card) 32'; Chambers (yellow card) 71'; Downes (yellow card) 73'	Report	Maddison 59'	Stadium: Portman Road; Attendance: 24,928; Referee: Tim Robinson

28 October 2017 13	Burton Albion	1–2	Ipswich Town	Burton upon Trent
15:00 BST	Turner 57'; Warnock (yellow card) 89'	Report	Chambers (yellow card) 53'; Waghorn 66' (yellow card) 79'; Celina 89' (yellow card) 90'	Stadium: Pirelli Stadium; Attendance: 4,110; Referee: Simon Hooper

31 October 2017 14	Cardiff City	3–1	Ipswich Town	Cardiff
19:45 GMT	Hoilett 12'; Bogle 46'; Morrison (yellow card) 83'; Ward 90+1'	Report	Smith (yellow card) 60'; Celina 90'	Stadium: Cardiff City Stadium; Attendance: 15,951; Referee: Oliver Langford

4 November 2017 15	Ipswich Town	3–0	Preston North End	Ipswich
15:00 GMT	McGoldrick (yellow card) 25' (goal) 49'; Waghorn 45+1'; Celina 64'	Report	Hugill (yellow card) 23'; Welsh (yellow card) 45'; Pearson (yellow card) 84'	Stadium: Portman Road; Attendance: 14,390; Referee: Andrew Madley

18 November 2017 16	Hull City	2–2	Ipswich Town	Kingston upon Hull
15:00 GMT	Bowen 34' (yellow card) 54'; Larsson (yellow card) 46'; Dicko 51'; Stewart (yellow card) 90+1'	Report	McGoldrick 6'; Webster (yellow card) 40'; Connolly (yellow card) 58'; Garner (yellow card) 64'; Knudsen (yellow card) 68'; Spence 88'; Ward (yellow card) 90+1'	Stadium: KCOM Stadium; Attendance: 15,516; Referee: David Coote

22 November 2017 17	Ipswich Town	2–2	Sheffield Wednesday	Ipswich
19:45 GMT	Garner 48'; Skuse (yellow card) 60'; Waghorn 70'	Report	Hooper 64' (pen.); Lee (yellow card) 77'; Hunt (yellow card) 81'; Nuhiu 90+3'	Stadium: Portman Road; Attendance: 15,702; Referee: Keith Stroud

25 November 2017 18	Aston Villa	2–0	Ipswich Town	Aston
15:00 GMT	Adomah 36', 66'	Report	Connolly (yellow card) 56'; Huws (yellow card) 73'	Stadium: Villa Park; Attendance: 30,427; Referee: Tony Harrington

28 November 2017 19	Derby County	0–1	Ipswich Town	Derby
19:45 GMT	Lawrence (yellow card) 33'; Russell (yellow card) 90'; Baird (yellow card) 90+5'	Report	Connolly 5'; Chambers (yellow card) 58'; Webster (yellow card) 64'; Downes (yellow card) 82'	Stadium: Pride Park Stadium; Attendance: 24,475; Referee: Scott Duncan

2 December 2017 20	Ipswich Town	4–2	Nottingham Forest	Ipswich
15:00 GMT	Connolly 7' (yellow card) 86'; Iorfa 37'; Waghorn 53' (yellow card) 82'; Celina 67'	Report	Dowell 29' (yellow card) 45'; Walker 43'; Bridcutt (yellow card) 90+4'	Stadium: Portman Road; Attendance: 16,808; Referee: Darren Bond

9 December 2017 21	Middlesbrough	2–0	Ipswich Town	Middlesbrough
15:00 GMT	Leadbitter (yellow card) 21'; Ayala (yellow card) 32'; Braithwaite 44' (yellow card) 90'; Bamford 51'	Report	Celina (yellow card) 59'	Stadium: Riverside Stadium; Attendance: 22,989; Referee: Robert Jones

16 December 2017 22	Ipswich Town	2–0	Reading	Ipswich
15:00 GMT (UTC)	Connolly 3'; Garner 27'; Waghorn (yellow card) 34'; Knudsen (yellow card) 69'; Webster (yellow card) 88'	Report	Barrow (yellow card) 8'; Bacuna (yellow card) 9'; McShane (yellow card) 52'; Edwards (yellow card) 66'	Stadium: Portman Road; Attendance: 13,832; Referee: Peter Bankes

23 December 2017 23	Wolverhampton Wanderers	1–0	Ipswich Town	Wolverhampton
15:00 GMT	Cavaleiro 40'	Report		Stadium: Molineux; Attendance: 30,218; Referee: David Coote

26 December 2017 24	Ipswich Town	0–0	Queens Park Rangers	Ipswich
15:00 GMT	Knudsen (yellow card) 24'	Report	Scowen (yellow card) 18' (yellow-red card) 86'	Stadium: Portman Road; Attendance: 18,696; Referee: Andy Davies

30 December 2017 25	Ipswich Town	1–2	Derby County	Ipswich
15:00 GMT	Garner 66'	Report	Winnall 13', 49'	Stadium: Portman Road; Attendance: 17,267; Referee: Oliver Langford

2 January 2018 26	Fulham	4–1	Ipswich Town	Fulham
19:45 GMT	Sessegnon 69', 74'; Kamara 72', 76'	Report	Garner 45'; Spence (red card) 54'	Stadium: Craven Cottage; Attendance: 17,415; Referee: Keith Stroud

13 January 2018 27	Ipswich Town	1–0	Leeds United	Ipswich
15:00 GMT	Connolly (yellow card) 55'; Iorfa (yellow card) 60'; Celina 67'	Report	O'Kane (red card) 37'; Jansson (yellow card) 80'; Phillips (yellow card) 87'	Stadium: Portman Road; Attendance: 18,638; Referee: Robert Jones

20 January 2018 28	Bolton Wanderers	1–1	Ipswich Town	Horwich
15:00 GMT	Madine (yellow card) 37', (goal) 53'	Report	Iorfa (yellow card) 73'; Garner 82'	Stadium: Macron Stadium; Attendance: 13,870; Referee: Peter Bankes

27 January 2018 29	Ipswich Town	0–1	Wolverhampton Wanderers	Ipswich
15:00 GMT	Gleeson (yellow card) 24'; Connolly (yellow card) 75'	Report	Doherty 15'; N'Diaye (yellow card) 84'	Stadium: Portman Road; Attendance: 15,971; Referee: Simon Hooper

3 February 2018 30	Sunderland	0–2	Ipswich Town	Sunderland
15:00 GMT	Asoro (yellow card) 19'	Report	Garner 35' (yellow card) 54'; Matthews 45+1' (o.g.)	Stadium: Stadium of Light; Attendance: 27,909; Referee: Darren England

10 February 2018 31	Ipswich Town	0–0	Burton Albion	Ipswich
15:00 GMT		Report	Dyer (yellow card) 25'	Stadium: Portman Road; Attendance: 13,815; Referee: David Webb

18 February 2018 32	Norwich City	1–1	Ipswich Town	Norwich
12:00 GMT	Leitner (yellow card) 58'; Klose 90+4'	Report	Garner (yellow card) 55'; Skuse (yellow card) 64'; Connolly (yellow card) 66'; Waghorn (yellow card) 79'; Spence (yellow card) 81'; Chambers 88'	Stadium: Carrow Road; Attendance: 27,100; Referee: David Coote

21 February 2018 33	Ipswich Town	0–1	Cardiff City	Ipswich
19:45 GMT		Report	Zohore 65'; Bryson (yellow card) 90+1'	Stadium: Portman Road; Attendance: 13,205; Referee: Andy Davies

24 February 2018 34	Preston North End	0–1	Ipswich Town	Preston
15:00 GMT		Report	Carayol 21'	Stadium: Deepdale; Attendance: 11,511; Referee: Scott Duncan

6 March 2018 35	Sheffield Wednesday	1–2	Ipswich Town	Owlerton, Sheffield
19:45 GMT	Boyd (yellow card) 33'; João 69'	Report	Carter-Vickers (yellow card) 41'; Waghorn 51', 83'; Chambers (yellow card) 83'	Stadium: Hillsborough Stadium; Attendance: 22,733; Referee: Oliver Langford

10 March 2018 36	Ipswich Town	0–0	Sheffield United	Ipswich
15:00 GMT	Skuse (yellow card) 40'; Gleeson (yellow card) 84'	Report	Stearman (yellow card) 9'	Stadium: Portman Road; Attendance: 15,152; Referee: John Brooks

13 March 2018 37	Ipswich Town	0–3	Hull City	Ipswich
19:45 GMT	Celina (yellow card) 44'	Report	Henriksen 18'; Wilson 40'; Bowen 47'	Stadium: Portman Road; Attendance: 13,031; Referee: Jeremy Simpson

17 March 2018 38	Bristol City	1–0	Ipswich Town	Bristol
15:00 GMT	Đurić 64'; Smith (yellow card) 84'	Report	Knudsen (yellow card) 87'	Stadium: Ashton Gate; Attendance: 21,509; Referee: Darren England

31 March 2018 39	Birmingham City	1–0	Ipswich Town	Birmingham
15:00 BST	Jota 21' (pen.); Dean (yellow card) 61'; Davis (yellow card) 78'	Report	Skuse (yellow card) 68'; Webster (yellow card) 89'; Waghorn (yellow card) 89'	Stadium: St Andrew's; Attendance: 20,555; Referee: Roger East

2 April 2018 40	Ipswich Town	2–2	Millwall	Ipswich
15:00	Waghorn 52', 54' (yellow card) 90'; Carayol (yellow card) 61'; Spence (yellow card) 80'; Gleeson (yellow card) 82'	Report	Cooper 27'; Saville 60'	Stadium: Portman Road; Attendance: 16,010; Referee: Steve Martin

7 April 2018 41	Brentford	1–0	Ipswich Town	Brentford
15:00 BST	McEachran (yellow card) 51'; Maypay 72'; Canós (yellow card) 90+1'	Report	Carter-Vickers (yellow card) 17'; Connolly (yellow card) 51'; Knudsen (yellow card) 72'	Stadium: Griffin Park; Attendance: 10,939; Referee: Robert Jones

10 April 2018 42	Ipswich Town	1–0	Barnsley	Ipswich
19:45 BST	Knudsen 54', (yellow card) 72'	Report	Yiadom (yellow card) 90'	Stadium: Portman Road; Attendance: 13,271; Referee: James Linington

14 April 2018 43	Nottingham Forest	2–1	Ipswich Town	West Bridgford
15:00 BST	Brereton (yellow card) 81', (goal) 89' (pen.); Lolley 90+5'	Report	Ward 38', (yellow card) 73'	Stadium: The City Ground; Attendance: 25,093; Referee: Darren England

21 April 2018 44	Ipswich Town	0–4	Aston Villa	Ipswich
15:00 BST	Ward (red card) 42'	Report	Hourihane 25'; Grabban 57', 78'; Lansbury 82'	Stadium: Portman Road; Attendance: 20,034; Referee: Simon Hooper

28 April 2018 45	Reading	0–4	Ipswich Town	Reading
15:00 BST (UTC+1)		Report	Waghorn 71'; Spence 79'; Sears 90+1'; Connolly 90+3'	Stadium: Madejski Stadium; Attendance: 17,683; Referee: Keith Stroud

6 May 2018 46	Ipswich Town	2–2	Middlesbrough	Ipswich
12:30 BST	Sears 8' (yellow card) 45+2'; Skuse (yellow card) 12'; Nydam (yellow card) 45+1'; Waghorn 83' (pen)	Report	Downing 71'; Bamford 90'; Gibson (yellow card) 90+4'	Stadium: Portman Road; Attendance: 18,829; Referee: David Coote

=== FA Cup ===
In the FA Cup, Ipswich Town entered the competition in the third round and were drawn at home against Sheffield United.

6 January 2018 Third round	Ipswich Town	0–1	Sheffield United	Ipswich
	Chambers (yellow card) 24'	Report	Thomas 25'; Basham (yellow card) 45+2'; Wright (yellow card) 81'; Carter-Vickers (yellow card) 90+3'	Stadium: Portman Road; Attendance: 12,057; Referee: Mike Jones

=== EFL Cup ===
On 16 June 2017, the first round draw took place with a trip to Luton Town confirmed. Another away tie was announced, when they were drawn away to Crystal Palace in the second round.

8 August 2017 First round	Luton Town	0–2	Ipswich Town	Luton
19:45 BST		Report	McGoldrick 34', 90+3'	Stadium: Kenilworth Road; Attendance: 4,610; Referee: Andy Haines

22 August 2017 Second round	Crystal Palace	2–1	Ipswich Town	Selhurst
19:30 BST	McArthur 76', 84'	Report	Downes (yellow card) 56'; Celina 90+1'	Stadium: Selhurst Park; Attendance: 9,837; Referee: Andy Davies

== Transfers ==
=== Transfers in ===
Date from	Position	Nationality	Name	From	Fee	Ref.
1 July 2017	CM	(England)	Tom Adeyemi	(Wales) Cardiff City	Free transfer	
1 July 2017	CF	(England)	Joe Garner	(Scotland) Rangers	Undisclosed (Note: Fee reported as £750,000)	
1 July 2017	DM	(Wales)	Emyr Huws	(Wales) Cardiff City	Undisclosed (Note: Fee reported as £1,000,000)	
7 August 2017	CF	(England)	Martyn Waghorn	(Scotland) Rangers	Undisclosed (Note: Fee reported as £250,000)	
4 January 2018	CF	(Republic of Ireland)	Aaron Drinan	(Republic of Ireland) Warterford	Undisclosed (Note: Fee reported as £90,000)	
19 January 2018	CM	(Republic of Ireland)	Stephen Gleeson	(England) Birmingham City	Free transfer	
24 January 2018	CB	(France)	Chris Goteni	(France) Saint-Apollinaire	Free transfer	
31 January 2018	RB	(Republic of Ireland)	Barry Cotter	(Republic of Ireland) Limerick	Undisclosed (Note: Fee reported as £70,000)	
31 January 2018	RM	(The Gambia)	Mustapha Carayol	(England) Nottingham Forest	Free transfer	

=== Loans in ===
Start date	Position	Nationality	Name	From	End date	Ref.
3 July 2017	AM	(Kosovo)	Bersant Celina	(England) Manchester City	30 June 2018	
14 July 2017	RB	(England)	Dominic Iorfa	(England) Wolverhampton Wanderers	30 June 2018	
31 August 2017	CB	(England)	Callum Connolly	(England) Everton	30 June 2018	
19 January 2018	CB	(United States)	Cameron Carter-Vickers	(England) Tottenham Hotspur	30 June 2018	

=== Transfers out ===
Date from	Position	Nationality	Name	To	Fee	Ref.
29 June 2017	CM	(England)	Kundai Benyu	(Scotland) Celtic	Compensation	
1 July 2017	CB	(Scotland)	Christophe Berra	(Scotland) Heart of Midlothian	Mutual consent	(Note: Christophe Berra joined Heart of Midlothian following his departure.)
1 July 2017	CF	(Republic of Ireland)	Leon Best	(England) Charlton Athletic	Free transfer	(Note: Leon Best joined Charlton Athletic following his release from the club.)
1 July 2017	CM	(England)	Giles Coke	Free agent	Released	
1 July 2017	CB	(England)	Paul Digby	(England) Mansfield Town	Free transfer	(Note: Paul Digby joined Mansfield Town following his release from the club.)
1 July 2017	CM	(Republic of Ireland)	Jonathan Douglas	Retired		
1 July 2017	GK	(England)	Jacob Marsden	Free agent	Released	
1 July 2017	CB	(England)	Joe Robinson	Free agent	Released	
1 July 2017	RB	(England)	Kieron Cathline	(England) Enfield Town	Free transfer	
1 July 2017	CM	(Scotland)	Ross Meldrum	Free agent	Released	
1 July 2017	CB	(Nigeria)	Kolade Salaudeen	Free agent	Released	
14 July 2017	CF	(Jersey)	Brett Pitman	(England) Portsmouth	Undisclosed	
17 July 2017	CB	(England)	Steven Taylor	(England) Peterborough United	Free transfer	(Note: Steven Taylor joined Peterborough United following his release.)
8 January 2018	CF	(England)	Kieffer Moore	(England) Barnsley	£750,000	
22 January 2018	CB	(New Zealand)	Tommy Smith	(United States) Colorado Rapids	Undisclosed	
26 January 2018	CM	(Republic of Ireland)	Adam McDonnell	(England) Aldershot Town	Free transfer	
31 January 2018	RB	(England)	George Fowler	(England) Aldershot Town	Free transfer	

=== Loans out ===
Start date	Position	Nationality	Name	To	End date	Ref.
10 July 2017	CF	(England)	Kieffer Moore	(England) Rotherham United	30 June 2018	
13 July 2017	RB	(England)	Josh Emmanuel	(England) Rotherham United	30 June 2018	
30 August 2017	CM	(Republic of Ireland)	Adam McDonnell	(England) Aldershot Town	29 November 2017	(Note: On 1 November, Adam McDonnell extended his loan spell at Aldershot Town for a further month.)
30 August 2017	RB	(England)	George Fowler	(England) Aldershot Town	29 November 2017	(Note: On 1 November, George Fowler extended his loan spell at Aldershot Town for a further month.)
2 November 2017	GK	(England)	Harry Wright	(England) East Thurrock United	2 December 2017	
23 December 2017	CB	(England)	Luke Woolfenden	(England) Bromley	30 June 2018	
2 January 2018	AM	(England)	Danny Rowe	(England) Lincoln City	30 June 2018	
31 January 2018	CM	(England)	Flynn Downes	(England) Luton Town	30 June 2018	
17 March 2018	RW	(England)	Jack Lankester	(England) Bury Town	1 May 2018	
17 March 2018	DM	(England)	Brett McGavin	(England) Bury Town	1 May 2018	
20 March 2018	AM	(Republic of Ireland)	Shane McLoughlin	(England) Bromley	1 May 2018	

== Squad statistics ==
All statistics updated as of end of season

=== Appearances and goals ===
No.	Pos	Nat	Player	Total		Championship		FA Cup		League Cup	
No.	Pos	Nat	Player	Apps	Goals	Apps	Goals	Apps	Goals	Apps	Goals
Goalkeepers
1	GK	(England) ENG	Dean Gerken	3	0	1	0	0	0	2	0
24	GK	(Wales) WAL	Michael Crowe	0	0	0	0	0	0	0	0
33	GK	(Poland) POL	Bartosz Białkowski	46	0	45	0	1	0	0	0
Defenders
2	DF	(England) ENG	Dominic Iorfa	25	1	20+3	1	1	0	1	0
3	DF	(Denmark) DEN	Jonas Knudsen	44	1	42	1	1	0	1	0
4	DF	(England) ENG	Luke Chambers	39	1	37	1	1	0	1	0
6	DF	(England) ENG	Adam Webster	29	0	25+3	0	0	0	1	0
12	DF	(England) ENG	Jordan Spence	40	4	37+3	4	0	0	0	0
16	DF	(England) ENG	Callum Connolly	34	4	29+4	4	1	0	0	0
27	DF	(United States) USA	Cameron Carter-Vickers	17	0	17	0	0	0	0	0
30	DF	(England) ENG	Myles Kenlock	18	0	15+1	0	1	0	1	0
37	DF	(Republic of Ireland) IRL	Barry Cotter	2	0	1+1	0	0	0	0	0
38	DF	(England) ENG	Patrick Webber	1	0	0	0	0	0	1	0
39	DF	(England) ENG	Luke Woolfenden	4	0	1+1	0	0	0	1+1	0
40	DF	(England) ENG	Chris Smith	1	0	0	0	0	0	0+1	0
Midfielders
7	MF	(England) ENG	Teddy Bishop	4	0	1+3	0	0	0	0	0
8	MF	(England) ENG	Cole Skuse	40	1	39	1	0	0	1	0
11	MF	(Kosovo) KOS	Bersant Celina	38	8	23+12	7	1	0	2	1
15	MF	(England) ENG	Tom Adeyemi	5	0	4+1	0	0	0	0	0
18	MF	(England) ENG	Grant Ward	37	2	25+12	2	0	0	0	0
19	MF	(England) ENG	Luke Hyam	18	0	6+11	0	1	0	0	0
22	MF	(England) ENG	Tristan Nydam	20	0	12+6	0	0	0	2	0
23	MF	(England) ENG	Andre Dozzell	1	0	1	0	0	0	0	0
25	MF	(Republic of Ireland) IRL	Stephen Gleeson	10	0	5+5	0	0	0	0	0
28	MF	(Mauritius) MRI	Kévin Bru	10	0	3+6	0	1	0	0	0
32	MF	(The Gambia) GAM	Mustapha Carayol	8	1	5+3	1	0	0	0	0
42	MF	(Republic of Ireland) IRL	Shane McLoughlin	2	0	0+1	0	0	0	1	0
44	MF	(Wales) WAL	Emyr Huws	5	0	3+2	0	0	0	0	0
Forwards
9	FW	(England) ENG	Martyn Waghorn	46	16	39+5	16	0+1	0	0+1	0
10	FW	(Republic of Ireland) IRL	David McGoldrick	24	8	18+4	6	1	0	1	2
14	FW	(England) ENG	Joe Garner	32	10	29+3	10	0	0	0	0
20	FW	(England) ENG	Freddie Sears	37	2	15+21	2	1	0	0	0
26	FW	(Republic of Ireland) IRL	Aaron Drinan	0	0	0	0	0	0	0	0
34	FW	(Australia) AUS	Ben Folami	5	0	1+3	0	0	0	1	0
35	FW	(England) ENG	Ben Morris	4	0	1+2	0	0	0	0+1	0
36	FW	(New Zealand) NZL	Monty Patterson	1	0	0	0	0	0	0+1	0
Players transferred out during the season
5	DF	(New Zealand) NZL	Tommy Smith	3	0	3	0	0	0	0	0
17	MF	(England) ENG	Danny Rowe	3	0	0+2	0	0	0	1	0
21	MF	(England) ENG	Flynn Downes	12	0	3+7	0	0	0	2	0
37	MF	(Republic of Ireland) IRL	Adam McDonnell	3	0	0+1	0	0	0	1+1	0
43	DF	(England) ENG	George Fowler	1	0	0	0	0	0	1	0

Last updated: end of season
Source: Competitions

=== Goalscorers ===
No.	Pos	Nat	Player	Championship	FA Cup	EFL Cup	Total
9	FW	(England)	Martyn Waghorn	16	0	0	16
14	FW	(England)	Joe Garner	10	0	0	10
10	FW	(Republic of Ireland)	David McGoldrick	6	0	2	8
11	MF	(Kosovo)	Bersant Celina	7	0	1	8
12	DF	(England)	Jordan Spence	4	0	0	4
16	DF	(England)	Callum Connolly	4	0	0	4
18	MF	(England)	Grant Ward	2	0	0	2
20	FW	(England)	Freddie Sears	2	0	0	2
2	DF	(England)	Dominic Iorfa	1	0	0	1
3	DF	(Denmark)	Jonas Knudsen	1	0	0	1
4	DF	(England)	Luke Chambers	1	0	0	1
8	MF	(England)	Cole Skuse	1	0	0	1
32	MF	(The Gambia)	Mustapha Carayol	1	0	0	1
Own goal				1	0	0	1
Total				57	0	3	60

=== Assists ===
No.	Pos	Nat	Player	Championship	FA Cup	EFL Cup	Total
9	FW	(England)	Martyn Waghorn	11	0	0	11
3	DF	(Denmark)	Jonas Knudsen	7	0	0	7
18	MF	(England)	Grant Ward	5	0	0	5
10	FW	(Republic of Ireland)	David McGoldrick	4	0	0	4
12	DF	(England)	Jordan Spence	4	0	0	4
14	FW	(England)	Joe Garner	3	0	0	3
2	DF	(England)	Dominic Iorfa	1	0	1	2
6	DF	(England)	Adam Webster	2	0	0	2
8	MF	(England)	Cole Skuse	1	0	0	1
11	MF	(Kosovo)	Bersant Celina	0	0	1	1
16	MF	(England)	Callum Connolly	1	0	0	1
30	DF	(England)	Myles Kenlock	1	0	0	1
32	MF	(The Gambia)	Mustapha Carayol	1	0	0	1
35	FW	(England)	Ben Morris	0	0	1	1
44	MF	(Wales)	Emyr Huws	1	0	0	1
Total				42	0	3	45

=== Clean sheets ===
Number	Nation	Name	Championship	FA Cup	EFL Cup	Total
1	(England)	Dean Gerken	1	0	1	2
33	(Poland)	Bartosz Białkowski	13	0	0	13
Total			14	0	1	15

=== Disciplinary record ===
No.	Pos.	Name	Championship		FA Cup		EFL Cup		Total	
No.	Pos.	Name	Booked	Sent off (straight red)	Booked	Sent off (straight red)	Booked	Sent off (straight red)	Booked	Sent off (straight red)
2	DF	(England) Dominic Iorfa	5	0	0	0	0	0	5	0
3	DF	(Denmark) Jonas Knudsen	10	0	0	0	0	0	10	0
4	DF	(England) Luke Chambers	6	0	1	0	1	0	8	0
5	DF	(New Zealand) Tommy Smith	1	0	0	0	0	0	1	0
6	DF	(England) Adam Webster	6	0	0	0	0	0	6	0
8	MF	(England) Cole Skuse	7	0	0	0	0	0	7	0
9	FW	(England) Martyn Waghorn	10	0	0	0	1	0	11	0
10	FW	(Republic of Ireland) David McGoldrick	1	0	0	0	1	0	2	0
11	MF	(Kosovo) Bersant Celina	3	0	0	0	0	0	3	0
12	DF	(England) Jordan Spence	5	1	0	0	0	0	5	1
14	FW	(England) Joe Garner	8	0	0	0	0	0	8	0
16	DF	(England) Callum Connolly	10	0	0	0	0	0	10	0
18	MF	(England) Grant Ward	3	1	0	0	0	0	3	1
20	FW	(England) Freddie Sears	1	0	0	0	0	0	1	0
21	MF	(England) Flynn Downes	3	0	0	0	2	0	5	0
22	MF	(England) Tristan Nydam	2	0	0	0	0	0	2	0
25	MF	(Republic of Ireland) Stephen Gleeson	3	0	0	0	0	0	3	0
27	DF	(United States) Cameron Carter-Vickers	3	0	1	0	0	0	4	0
30	DF	(England) Myles Kenlock	1	0	0	0	0	0	1	0
32	MF	(The Gambia) Mustapha Carayol	2	0	0	0	0	0	2	0
44	MF	(Wales) Emyr Huws	1	0	0	0	0	0	1	0
Total			91	2	2	0	5	0	98	2

== Awards ==
=== Player awards ===
Award	Player	Ref
Player of the Year	(Poland) Bartosz Białkowski	
Players' Player of the Year	(Poland) Bartosz Białkowski	
Young Player of the Year	(England) Flynn Downes	
Goal of the Season	(Kosovo) Bersant Celina	
