= Danny Rowe (footballer, born 1992) =

British footballer

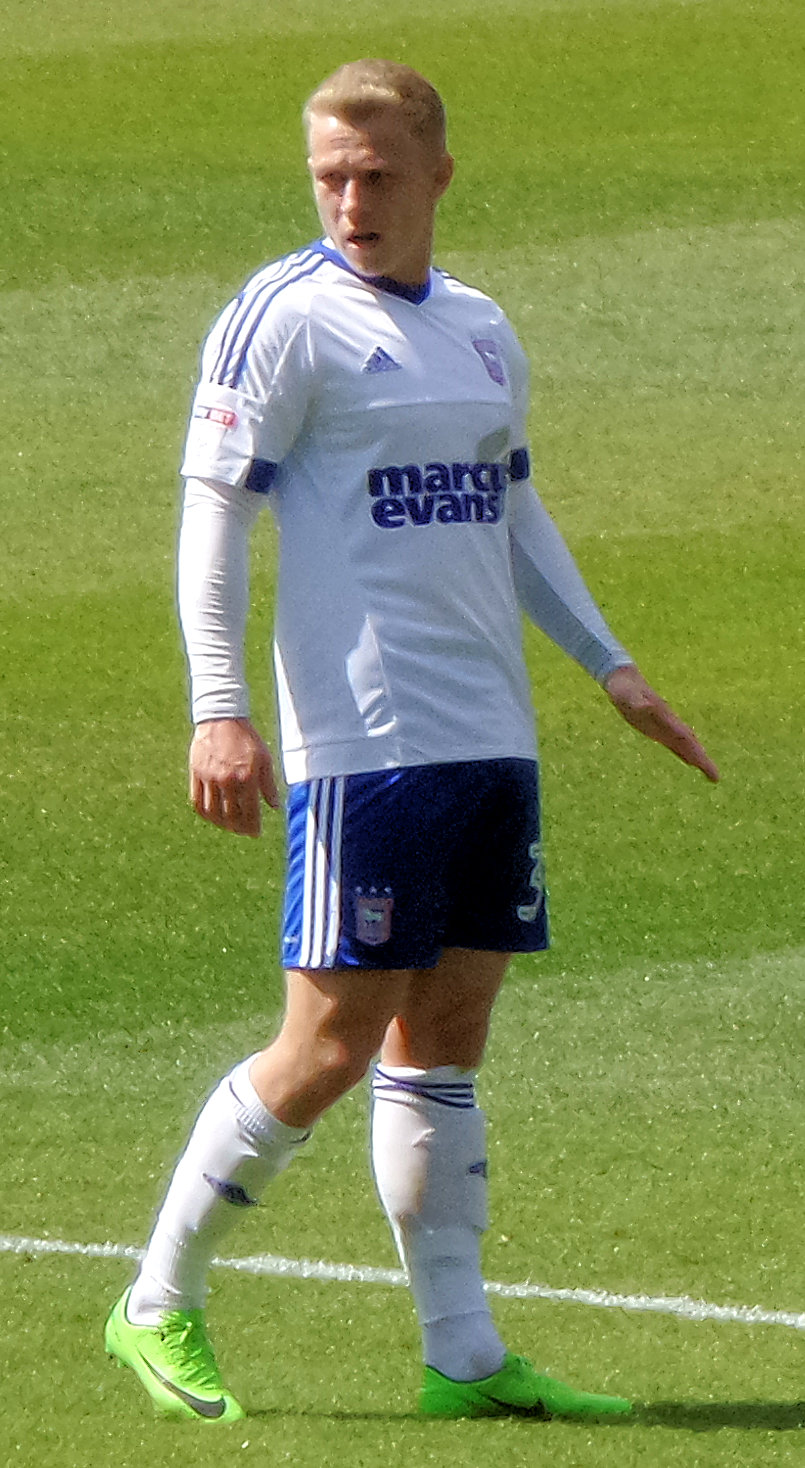
- Danny Rowe playing for Ipswich Town in 2017

Personal information
- Full name: Daniel Martin Rowe
- Date of birth: 9 March 1992 (age 34)
- Place of birth: Wythenshawe, England
- Height: 6 ft 0 in (1.83 m)
- Position: Winger

Youth career
- –2008: Bolton Wanderers
- 2008–2009: Stockport County

Senior career*
Years	Team	Apps	(Gls)
2009–2012	Stockport County	50	(1)
2010	→ Northwich Victoria (loan)	0	(0)
2012–2013	Barrow	40	(7)
2013–2014	Macclesfield Town	28	(1)
2015–2017	Macclesfield Town	75	(11)
2017–2020	Ipswich Town	23	(1)
2018	→ Lincoln City (loan)	12	(1)
2019	→ Lincoln City (loan)	17	(4)
2021–2022	Burton Albion	17	(0)
Total		262	(26)
- * Club domestic league appearances and goals

Daniel Martin Rowe (born 9 March 1992) is an English former footballer who played as a winger. He is the younger brother of Tommy Rowe.

He began his career at Stockport County in 2009, and made 56 appearances in four seasons at the club either side of a brief loan spell at Northwich Victoria. He spent the 2012–13 season with Barrow, before joining Macclesfield Town in 2013. He left Macclesfield, before rejoining them in January 2015 and then moving on to Ipswich Town in January 2017. In January 2018 he joined Lincoln City on loan till the rest of the season, a move that he repeated in January 2019. Rowe was released by Ipswich in 2020 and went on to sign for Burton Albion in February 2021.

== Club career ==
=== Stockport County ===
Rowe joined Stockport County after leaving the youth academy at Bolton Wanderers. He made his first team debut as a 60th-minute substitute for Paul Turnbull in a 1–0 defeat to Leeds United in a League One match at Elland Road on 11 April 2009. He made two further appearances in the 2008–09 season and played four games in the 2009–10 relegation campaign. On 11 November 2010, he joined Andy Preece's Northwich Victoria on loan, and made his debut for the "Vics" two days later in a 1–0 victory over F.C. United of Manchester at the Victoria Stadium. He made three appearances, including one in the FA Trophy, in which he scored his first goal in senior football. He returned to Edgeley Park, and after having struggled to establish himself under Gary Ablett, Paul Simpson or Peter Ward, managed to earn himself a run in the first team under Ray Mathias after impressing for the reserves in the Manchester Senior Cup. He played 21 games in the 2010–11 campaign as the "Hatters" were relegated out of League Two after finishing bottom of the Football League. He scored his first professional goal in County's 2–1 win over Southend United on 26 March 2011. He was only one of five of 16 out-of-contract players to be offered a new one-year deal by the club in May 2011. He ended the 2011–12 campaign with 28 appearances to his name as County finished 16th in the Conference Premier under the stewardship of Jim Gannon.

=== Non-league ===
Rowe signed for David Bayliss's Barrow in July 2012. He scored five goals in 38 appearances in the 2012–13 season as the "Bluebirds" were relegated out of the Conference Premier.

Rowe joined Macclesfield Town after impressing on trial in the 2013 pre-season. On 26 October, he scored a hat-trick in a 7–0 win over Vauxhall Motors in an FA Cup fourth round qualifying tie at Moss Rose. Macclesfield finished the 2013–14 season in 15th-place, with Rowe totalling 33 league and cup appearances.

Having taken some time out of the game, Rowe rejoined Macclesfield Town five months later. He made ten appearances in the second half of the 2014–15 season as Macclesfield narrowly missed out on a place in the play-offs. He signed a new contract with the "Silkmen" in June 2015. He became a key player in the 2015–16 campaign, scoring five goals from 47 games. In January 2017, he was reported to be closely monitored by Derby County, Walsall, Port Vale and Barnet.

=== Ipswich Town ===
Rowe signed for Ipswich Town under Mick McCarthy in January 2017 for an undisclosed fee. On 18 March 2017 Rowe made his debut away to Cardiff City when he came on as substitute for Toumani Diagouraga.

==== Lincoln City (loans) ====
On 2 January 2018, Rowe joined League Two side Lincoln City on loan for the remainder of the 2017–18 season. He made 16 appearances in all competitions during his loan spell at Lincoln, scoring twice.

On 17 January 2019, Rowe once again joined Lincoln City on loan for the remainder of the 2018–19 season. Rowe again impressed during his second loan spell at Sincil Bank, scoring 4 goals in 17 appearances as Lincoln won the League Two title and promotion to League One.

==== Return to Ipswich ====
Following the club's relegation to League One, Rowe returned to the club after a successful loan spell away at Lincoln, and became a regular player for the side during the first few months of the 2019–20 season, making 14 appearances and netting his first goal for the club on 5 November 2019, the winner in a 0–1 away win over Rochdale. However, this run was cut short after he sustained a knee injury in December, which put him out for more than five months.

With football suspended due to the COVID-19 pandemic and with his contract expiring, on 18 May 2020 the club announced they had decided against taking up the 12-month extension in his contract and he left the club.

=== Burton Albion ===
On 13 February 2021, Rowe signed for League One side Burton Albion on a short-term contract until the end of the 2020–21 season. Rowe was released by the club at the end of the 2021–22 season.

== Style of play ==
Speaking in April 2016, Macclesfield Town manager John Askey said that Rowe was "brave, strong, quick, good on the ball and has a good shot on him".

== Personal life ==
His older brother, Tommy, is also a professional footballer.

== Career statistics ==
As of end of 2021–22 season

Appearances and goals by club, season and competition
Club	Season	League			FA Cup		League Cup		Other		Total	
Club	Season	Division	Apps	Goals	Apps	Goals	Apps	Goals	Apps	Goals	Apps	Goals
Stockport County	2008–09	League One	3	0	0	0	0	0	0	0	3	0
Stockport County	2009–10	League One	4	0	0	0	0	0	0	0	4	0
Stockport County	2010–11	League Two	17	1	0	0	2	0	2 (Note: Appearances in Football League Trophy)	0	21	1
Stockport County	2011–12	Conference Premier	26	0	0	0	—		2 (Note: Appearance(s) in FA Trophy)	0	28	0
Stockport County	Total		50	1	0	0	2	0	4	0	56	1
Barrow	2012–13	Conference Premier	40	7	3	0	—		2	1	45	8
Macclesfield Town	2013–14	Conference Premier	28	1	3	0	—		1	0	32	1
Macclesfield Town	2014–15	Conference Premier	9	0	0	0	—		0	0	9	0
Macclesfield Town	2015–16	National League	41	5	1	0	—		4	0	46	5
Macclesfield Town	2016–17	National League	25	6	3	0	—		1	1	29	7
Macclesfield Town	Total		103	12	7	0	0	0	6	1	116	13
Ipswich Town	2016–17	Championship	4	0	0	0	0	0	—		4	0
Ipswich Town	2017–18	Championship	2	0	0	0	1	0	—		3	0
Ipswich Town	2018–19	Championship	3	0	0	0	1	0	—		4	0
Ipswich Town	2019–20	League One	14	1	2	0	1	0	1 (Note: Appearance(s) in EFL Trophy)	0	18	1
Ipswich Town	Total		23	1	2	0	3	0	1	0	29	1
Lincoln City (loan)	2017–18	League Two	12	1	0	0	0	0	4	1	16	2
Lincoln City (loan)	2018–19	League Two	17	4	0	0	0	0	0	0	17	4
Burton Albion	2020–21	League One	15	0	0	0	0	0	0	0	15	0
Burton Albion	2021–22	League One	2	0	0	0	1	0	2	0	5	0
Burton Albion	Total		17	0	0	0	1	0	2	0	20	0
Career total			262	26	12	0	6	0	19	3	299	29

== Honours ==
Lincoln City

- EFL League Two: 2018–19
- EFL Trophy: 2017–18
