= Jonas Knudsen =

Danish footballer (born 1992)

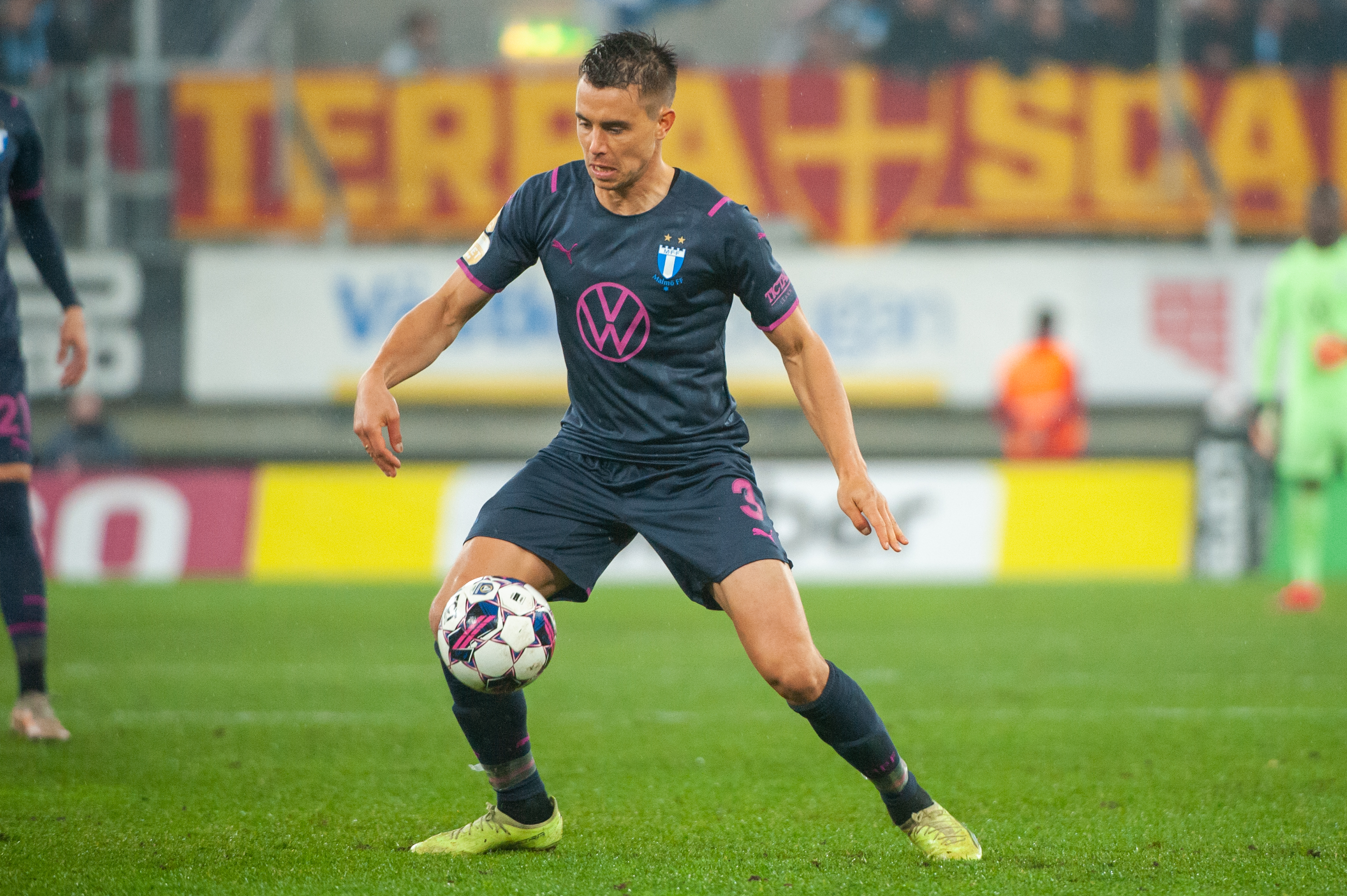
- Knudsen playing for Malmö FF in 2022

Personal information
- Full name: Jonas Hjort Knudsen
- Date of birth: 16 September 1992 (age 34)
- Place of birth: Esbjerg, Denmark
- Height: 1.87 m (6 ft 2 in)
- Position: Left back

Youth career
- 2004–2006: Hjerting IF
- 2006–2009: Esbjerg fB

Senior career*
Years	Team	Apps	(Gls)
2009–2015	Esbjerg fB	123	(5)
2015–2019	Ipswich Town	148	(4)
2019–2023	Malmö FF	63	(1)

International career
2009–2010	Denmark U18	6	(0)
2010–2011	Denmark U19	9	(0)
2011–2012	Denmark U20	3	(0)
2013–2015	Denmark U21	17	(0)
2013–2019	Denmark	7	(0)
- * Club domestic league appearances and goals as of 25 January 2024

Jonas Hjort Knudsen (born 16 September 1992) is a Danish former professional footballer who played as a defender.

He played for Esbjerg fB from 2009 before signing with Ipswich Town in 2015. He is known for his long throws and in Denmark his throws have been compared to Rory Delap's.

== Club career ==
=== Esbjerg fB ===
In November 2009 he signed his first professional contract with Esbjerg, and following the winter break of the Danish Superliga, he made his professional debut in a 0–4 home loss against Randers FC, becoming the second youngest Esbjerg debutant ever second only to Andreas Sørensen who made his debut aged 16 years.

Following the departure of Kevin Conboy to NEC, Knudsen established himself as the first choice left back for the club. In the 2012–13 season, the Esbjerg team finished fourth in the Danish Superliga and won the Danish Cup, and Knudsen was given a new contract in April 2013.

=== Ipswich Town ===
Knudsen signed for Ipswich Town on 31 July 2015 on a three-year deal. He debuted for the club on 8 August 2015, in a 2–2 draw with Brentford. He scored his first goal on 19 April 2016, scoring a late equaliser in a 1–1 draw with Fulham at Portman Road. He went on to make 43 appearances during his first season at Portman Road, scoring once.

He continued to feature as a first-team regular during his second season at the club, making his first appearance on the opening day of the season in a 4–2 win over Barnsley. During the season he memorably scored in both East Anglian derbies, which both finished 1–1. He made 36 appearances over the course of the season, scoring twice.

His first appearance of the 2017–18 season came on the opening day of the season in a 1–0 win over Birmingham City. On 21 December 2017, Ipswich took up the option to extend Knudsen's contract until 2019. He scored his first goal of the season on 10 April, netting the winner in a 1–0 home win over Barnsley. Knudsen took on the captain's armband for the final few games of the season, following injuries to club captain Luke Chambers. He made 44 appearances during the season, scoring once.

After returning from the 2018 FIFA World Cup, Knudsen was linked with moves from multiple clubs including Stoke City and Middlesbrough. He kept his place in the team once again, featuring as a first-team regular throughout the season. In January 2019 he informed the club that he would not be signing a new contract, and he was released at the end of the 2018–19 season following the expiration of his contract. Despite rejecting a new contract, Knudsen posted a farewell message on social media, thanking the fans for their support during his tenure.

=== Malmö FF ===
On 20 June 2019, Knudsen signed for Swedish club Malmö FF on a free transfer. He made his debut on 21 July 2019 in a 1–1 draw with IK Sirius.

== International career ==
Knudsen has represented Denmark at various youth levels. He made his senior international debut as a substitute in a 1–0 friendly win over Sweden on 28 June 2014.

In May 2018 he was named in Denmark's preliminary 35-man squad for the 2018 FIFA World Cup in Russia. On 17 June, the Danish squad allowed Knudsen to fly home to meet his newborn daughter, as the Danish squad clubbed together to pay for a private flight as a paternity present for their team-mate. Following his return to Russia, he made his first and only appearance of Denmark's World Cup campaign on 1 July, starting and playing the full 120 minutes as Denmark drew 1–1 with Croatia, before exiting the tournament on penalties after extra time, with Knudsen playing his part in creating Denmark's opening goal following a long throw into the Croatian box.

He was included in Denmark's squad for the 2018–19 UEFA Nations League, featuring in the Dane's 0–0 draw with the Republic of Ireland in the group stages on 13 November 2018 at the Aarhus Idrætspark, Aarhus.

== Career statistics ==
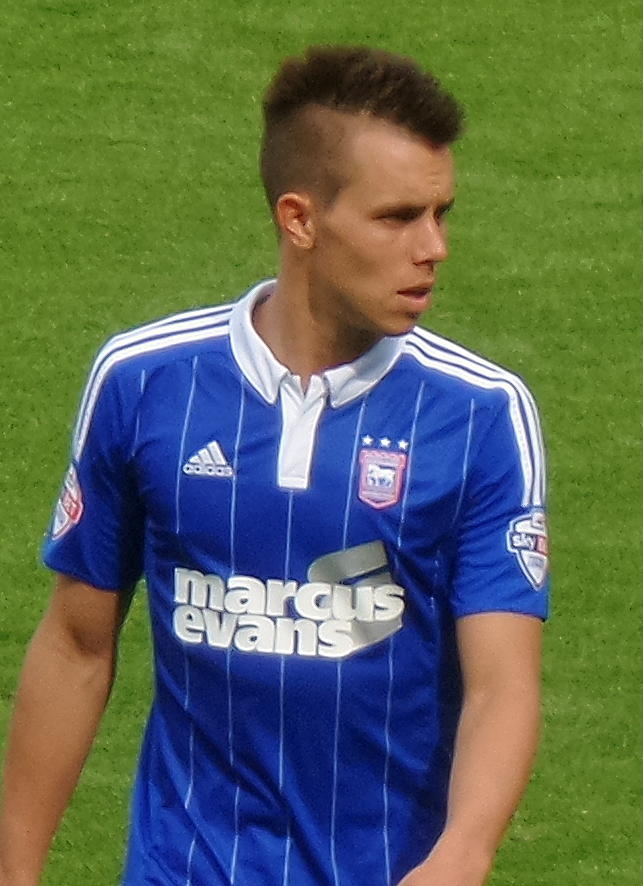
Knudsen playing for Ipswich Town in 2015.

=== Club ===
As of match played 12 November 2023

Appearances and goals by club, season and competition
Club	Season	League			National Cup		League Cup		Europe		Total	
Club	Season	Division	Apps	Goals	Apps	Goals	Apps	Goals	Apps	Goals	Apps	Goals
Esbjerg fB	2009–10	Superligaen	7	0	0	0	—		—		7	0
Esbjerg fB	2010–11	Superligaen	5	0	2	0	—		—		7	0
Esbjerg fB	2011–12	1. Division	18	1	1	0	—		—		19	1
Esbjerg fB	2012–13	Superligaen	32	1	5	1	—		—		37	2
Esbjerg fB	2013–14	Superligaen	31	1	1	0	—		8 (Note: Appearances in UEFA Europa League)	0	40	1
Esbjerg fB	2014–15	Superligaen	28	2	4	0	—		0	0	32	2
Esbjerg fB	2015–16	Superligaen	2	0	0	0	—		—		2	0
Esbjerg fB	Total		123	5	13	1	0	0	8	0	144	6
Ipswich Town	2015–16	Championship	42	1	1	0	0	0	—		43	1
Ipswich Town	2016–17	Championship	36	2	2	0	1	0	—		39	2
Ipswich Town	2017–18	Championship	42	1	1	0	1	0	—		44	1
Ipswich Town	2018–19	Championship	28	0	0	0	1	0	—		29	0
Ipswich Town	Total		148	4	4	0	3	0	0	0	155	4
Malmö FF	2019	Allsvenskan	11	0	1	0	—		8	0	20	0
Malmö FF	2020	Allsvenskan	30	0	5	1	—		4	0	39	1
Malmö FF	2021	Allsvenskan	12	1	0	0	—		2 (Note: Appearances in UEFA Champions League)	0	14	1
Malmö FF	2022	Allsvenskan	10	0	0	0	—		6 (Note: Two appearances in UEFA Champions League, four appearances in UEFA Europa League)	0	16	0
Malmö FF	2023	Allsvenskan	0	0	0	0	—		—		0	0
Malmö FF	Total		63	1	6	1	0	0	20	0	89	2
Career total			334	10	23	2	3	0	28	0	388	12

=== International ===
Appearances and goals by national team and year
National team	Year	Apps	Goals
Denmark	2014	2	0
Denmark	2018	4	0
Denmark	2019	1	0
Total		7	0

== Honours ==
Esbjerg fB

- Danish Cup: 2012–13
- Danish 1st Division: 2011–12

Malmö FF

- Allsvenskan: 2020, 2021, 2023
- Svenska Cupen: 2021–22

Individual

- Esbjerg fB Player of the Year: 2014–15
