= Freddie Sears =

English footballer (born 1989)

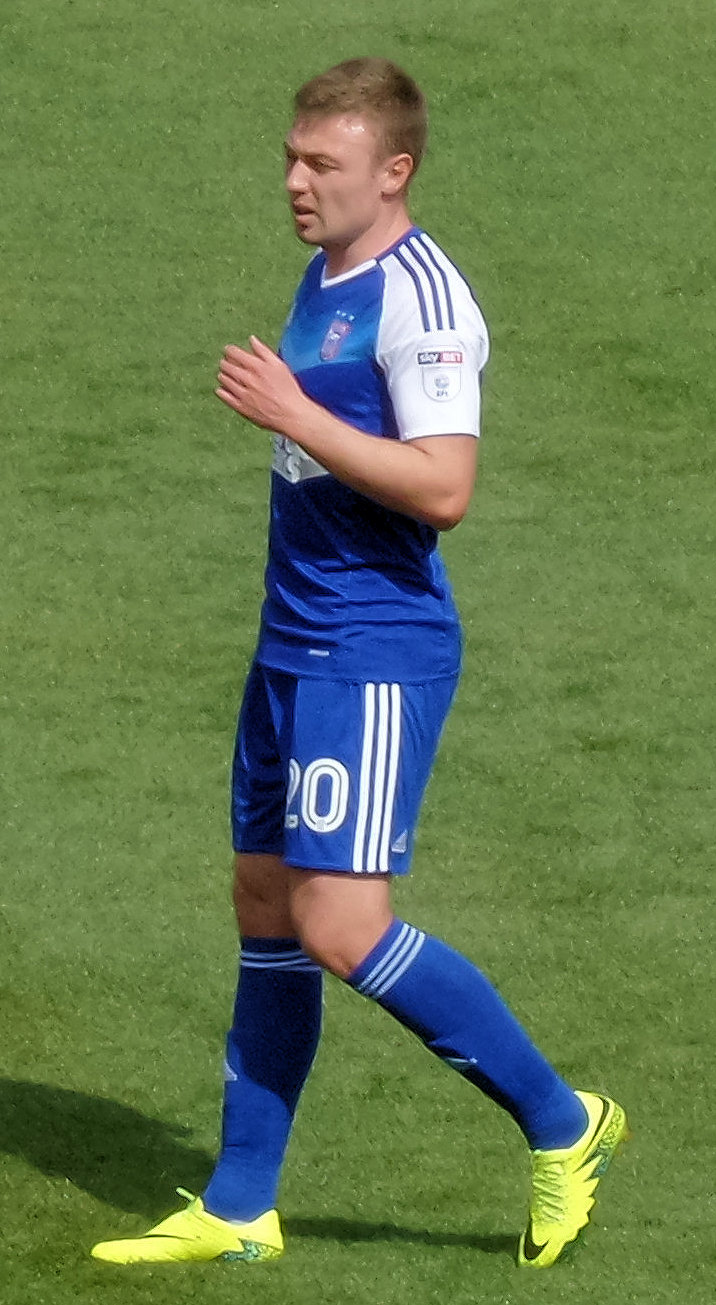
- Sears in 2016

Personal information
- Full name: Frederick David Sears
- Date of birth: 27 November 1989 (age 36)
- Place of birth: Hornchurch, England
- Height: 5 ft 7 in (1.70 m)
- Position: Forward

Team information
- Current team: Brentwood Town

Youth career
- 2000–2007: West Ham United

Senior career*
Years	Team	Apps	(Gls)
2007–2012	West Ham United	46	(2)
2009	→ Crystal Palace (loan)	18	(0)
2010	→ Coventry City (loan)	10	(0)
2010	→ Scunthorpe United (loan)	9	(0)
2012	→ Colchester United (loan)	11	(2)
2012–2015	Colchester United	91	(29)
2015–2021	Ipswich Town	203	(32)
2021–2023	Colchester United	76	(16)
2023–2024	Dagenham & Redbridge	21	(1)
2024	Braintree Town	10	(1)
2024–2025	Chatham Town	39	(21)
2025–2026	Maldon & Tiptree	44	(29)
2026–	Brentwood Town	0	(0)

International career^{‡}
2007–2008	England U19	8	(3)
2009	England U20	1	(0)
2009	England U21	3	(1)
- * Club domestic league appearances and goals as of 16:19, 7 August 2026 (UTC) ‡ National team caps and goals as of 19:27, 7 January 2013 (UTC)

Frederick David Sears (born 27 November 1989) is an English professional footballer who plays as a forward for Isthmian League Premier Division club Brentwood Town.

He started his career with his local club West Ham United at the age of eleven, progressing through the West Ham United Academy. He made a scoring first-team debut in March 2008 when he netted the winner against Blackburn Rovers after coming on as a second-half substitute. Sears made over 50 first-team appearances for West Ham, but never held down a regular starting position.

Sears had loan spells with Crystal Palace, Coventry City and Scunthorpe United, before joining Colchester United for the latter half of the 2011–12 season. He scored two goals in 11 appearances for the U's, prompting the club to sign him on a permanent basis from the Hammers in July 2012. After joining the Essex club, Sears rediscovered his scoring form, scoring 34 goals in 99 games in his two-and-a-half-year stay before departing for Ipswich. Sears has also represented England at under-19, under-20 and under-21 levels.

== Club career ==
=== West Ham United ===
Born in Hornchurch, East London, Sears scored his first goal in the Premier Reserve League South on 20 November 2006 when West Ham drew 1–1 with Portsmouth. He scored a further three goals in 14 reserve appearances, making ten starts. In addition, Sears made 28 appearances in the Academy League, where he netted nine goals and started 19 games.

==== 2007–08 season ====
Sears began the 2007–08 season in good scoring form during a prolific run with the clubs' under-18 side, which included a hat-trick against Millwall in early October 2007. Having been consistent and scoring 20 goals in 15 games to February 2008, Academy coach Tony Carr warned Sears that he needed to remain focused in order to achieve his goal of breaking into the first-team squad. Sears had already been asked on a frequent basis to train alongside the first-team under Alan Curbishley's stewardship. Sears managed a total of 17 under-18 games, starting 16 matches scoring 22 goals. He also appeared in one FA Youth Cup game, and started four reserve games, appearing in six and scoring three goals.

On the back of his excellent form at both Reserve and Academy levels, Sears was first handed a new contract on 11 March 2008 to tie him to the club until 2010, and he was then handed his first-team debut on 15 March, aged 18, in a Premier League game against Blackburn Rovers. With both sides deadlocked at 1–1, Sears came on for Nolberto Solano in the 75th minute and scored the winner, also his debut goal, just five minutes and 16 seconds into his first-team career, heading in the rebound from his initial attempt at goal. Sears said that he was buzzing following his debut, and it was made even sweeter as a West Ham fan with his friends and family in the stands at the Boleyn Ground. Sears again appeared as a substitute one week later as West Ham secured a draw at Everton. He had a chance to win the game in the 90th minute, but his effort clipped the post.

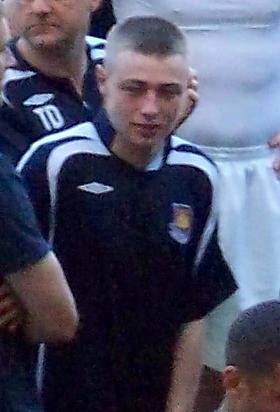
Sears with West Ham United in 2008

Sears made his first senior start for West Ham on 19 April in a match with Derby County. After featuring for 75 minutes, manager Alan Curbishley was verbally abused by the home fans when he withdrew Sears and replaced him with Carlton Cole. However, Curbishley's decision was justified just two minutes later when Cole scored the winner for the Hammers. Sears ended the season with a total of seven first-team appearances.

==== 2008–09 season ====
Sears missed 2008–09 pre-season with West Ham due to international duty with the England under-19s in the European Under-19 Championship. He featured in his first game of pre-season in a youthful Hammers side that beat Thurrock on 27 July. He made his first appearance of the season for the first-team in West Ham's 2–1 win over Wigan Athletic on 16 August 2008. Sears signed a new five-year contract in November 2008. Sears played 17 Premier League games during the season, alongside three FA Cup and two League Cup appearances. He also featured for the Reserve side, making seven appearances and scoring five goals. He scored all four goals for the Hammers in a 4–3 win over West Bromwich Albion on 30 September 2008.

==== 2009–10 season ====
Prior to the beginning of the 2009–10 season, Hammers manager Gianfranco Zola announced his intention to send Sears out on loan to 'prove himself'. Leyton Orient manager Geraint Williams expressed an interest in signing Sears on loan, but showed concern that he may but put off in signing for a League One club. Crystal Palace manager Neil Warnock also showed his interest in taking Sears on loan, before confirming his signing on a season-long loan deal on 22 June 2009.

==== Crystal Palace (loan) ====
Warnock said he was "delighted" to have Sears on board at the club following his loan signing, praising the player for agreeing to the switch despite late interest from Queens Park Rangers. Sears scored in his first appearance in Palace colours on 14 July, scoring in a 5–2 win in Baltimore, US, against Crystal Palace's American affiliates Crystal Palace Baltimore. He made it two goals in two pre-season games, netting a 20-yard shot in their 3–1 win against Harrisburg City Islanders on 17 July. Sears later told Warnock that he was happy to play where his manager wanted following his positive start to his Crystal Palace career. He scored his third goal in four games in a 3–0 friendly win over Bristol Rovers on 24 July, before starting in Palace's Championship opening fixture against Plymouth Argyle on 8 August. Sears admitted that he should have scored a debut goal but was confident he would be on the scoresheet before too long.

Sears started in Palace's next match against Bristol City at Ashton Gate, and looked to have scored his first goal for the club in the fixture on 15 August. However, the match officials failed to see the ball cross the line and the goal was not awarded after Sears shot had flown into the back of the net, hit the stanchion at the back of the goal and bounced back out. Palace went on to lose 1–0 to a late goal from Nicky Maynard. Following his appearances for England under-21s and a goal against Macedonia, Neil Warnock hoped that Sears' goal for his country would help to break his duck at Crystal Palace. He returned to first-team action as a second-half substitute in Palace's 4–0 defeat by Scunthorpe United on 12 September, where he missed a penalty despite wrestling the ball from usual penalty taker Neil Danns with the intention of scoring his first goal for the club. Sears injured his ankle late in the game, and left Selhurst Park wearing a cast. He returned to action as a substitute for the injured Victor Moses in the Eagles 1–1 draw at Cardiff City on 17 October.

In November 2009, Warnock confirmed that Sears was not able to be recalled by West Ham before January, with his parent club struggling for forwards following an injury to Carlton Cole, although Warnock later said that he was aiming to get Sears scoring for the team, with West Ham now reportedly willing to allow Sears to join Palace on a permanent basis in January. In December, despite still failing to find the back of the net for the club, West Ham announced their intention to recall Sears from his loan to attempt to ease their injury troubles. Warnock confirmed that following Crystal Palace's game with Swansea City on 28 December, Sears would return to the Hammers. After making 19 appearances in the league and League Cup, Sears completed his loan spell without making the scoresheet.

==== First return to West Ham ====
Sears returned to West Ham after his Crystal Palace loan and went into the squad to face Arsenal in the third round of the FA Cup on 3 January 2010. He came on as a substitute for Frank Nouble in the 2–1 home defeat to a warm reception from the Hammers faithful. He played just once more for the club during the season, with his last appearance coming in the Premier League, once again as a late substitute for Nouble in a 0–0 home draw with Blackburn Rovers on 30 January. He did however score twice in the Premier Reserve League 4–2 defeat to Arsenal on 12 January. He made two appearances in the Reserve League across the season.

==== Coventry City (loan) ====
Coventry City signed Sears on 11 February 2010 in a 93-day loan deal to see him spend the rest of the season at the Ricoh Arena, while Sears was reassured by West Ham manager Gianfranco Zola that he still had a future at Upton Park. Sears said that City manager Chris Coleman was a major influence in his decision to join the club based on his past achievements with Fulham, and that Bristol City had made a late attempt to sign the player. He made his City debut on 13 February, replacing Clinton Morrison after 67 minutes in a 1–0 win over Queens Park Rangers.

Despite making only substitute appearances for his first six games for the Sky Blues, Sears hoped to push for a starting position, and confirmed that there was a possibility that he could return to the Ricoh Arena for the 2010–11 season. He then made his first start for the club on 27 March in a 1–1 home draw with Sheffield Wednesday. After starting for Coventry in their 1–0 away defeat to Sheffield United on 10 April, Sears suffered an ankle injury in training, ruling him out of action briefly, but a set-back in his recovery effectively ruled him out of contention for the remainder of the season. Sears' loan spell ended with ten league appearances for the Sky Blues, once again failing to find the back of the net. At the end of the campaign, Coleman admitted that it would be unlikely that Sears would return to the club for the 2010–11 season.

==== 2010–11 season ====
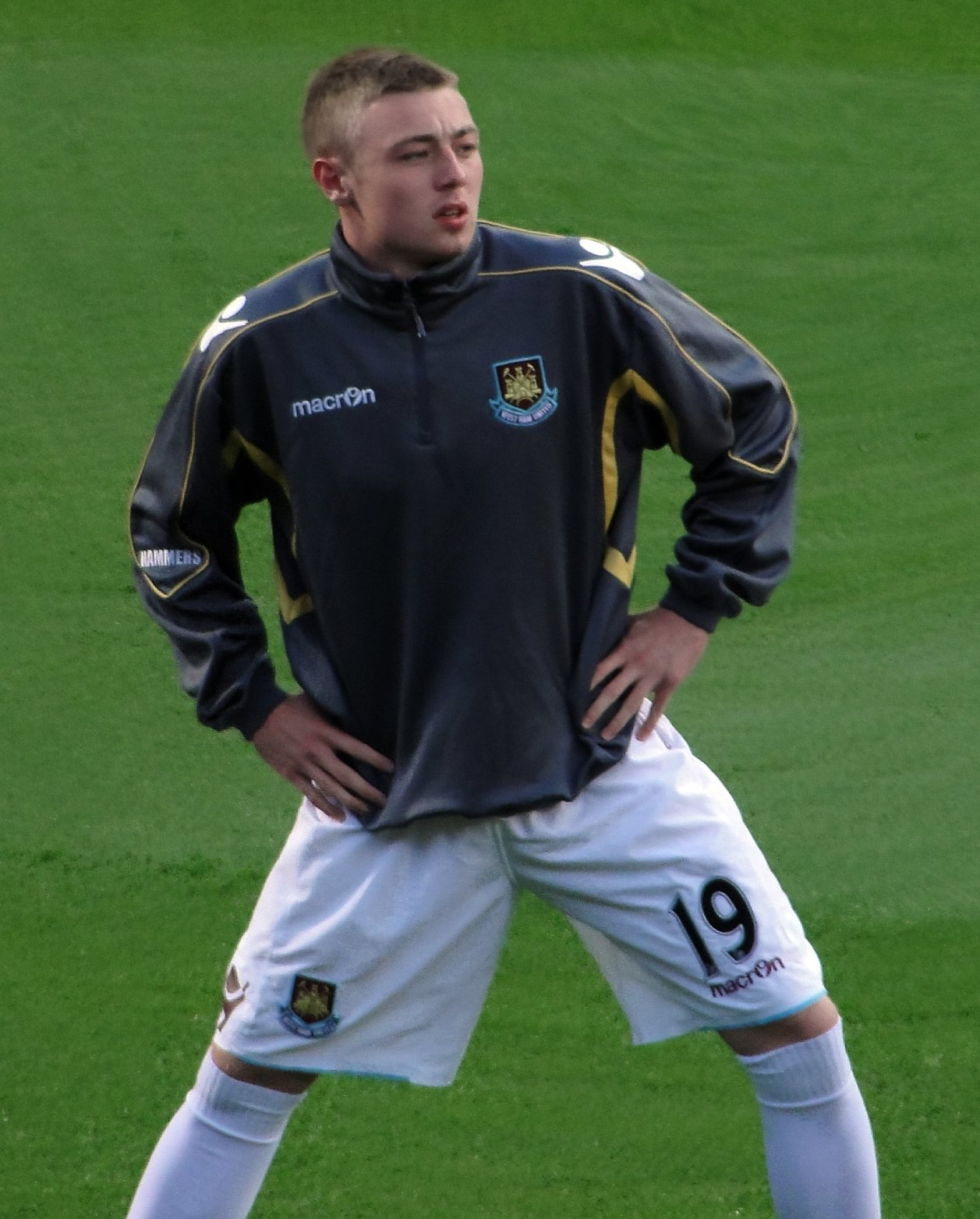
Sears warming up for West Ham United in 2010

Sears returned to West Ham in May 2010 following his loan stint with Coventry, where he played in Academy director Tony Carr's testimonial match, scoring West Ham's fourth goal in their 5–1 win against an Academy All-Star team. On 30 July, Sears scored all four goals in a pre-season game for the reserves against Bishop's Stortford in his quest to earn a place in the West Ham first team. He made a late substitute appearance against Bolton Wanderers on 21 August, replacing Carlton Cole with three minutes remaining of the Hammers' 3–1 home loss. Sears then made his first start since 16 March 2009 three days later when West Ham faced Oxford United in the League Cup. Sears played for 78 minutes in the 1–0 victory before being replaced by Benni McCarthy.

==== Scunthorpe United (loan) ====
Sears returned to the Championship on loan once again on 19 October 2010, joining Scunthorpe United for one month ahead of their clash with Preston North End the same day. He made his debut in the match, playing the full 90 minutes as the Iron emerged 3–2 victors. Manager Ian Baraclough was pleased with the impact Sears had in the game, with his 83rd minute shot hitting the post, allowing Martyn Woolford to score. The club extended Sears loan stay in November ahead of their clash with Cardiff City, keeping him with Scunthorpe until January. After making nine starts but failing to score for the club, Sears was recalled by his parent club in December 2010 following another injury crisis at Upton Park.

==== Second return to West Ham ====
On his return to West Ham, Sears was thrust into the starting line-up for the Hammers' Boxing Day clash with Fulham at Craven Cottage, a game in which he played the full 90 minutes and West Ham won 3–1. Manager Avram Grant opted to play Sears in a right midfield role for the games against Fulham and a 1–1 draw with Everton on 28 December, games in which Sears put in solid performances. Sears said that his loan spell away with Scunthorpe left him feeling "refreshed" and he felt "like a new man". Sears then scored his second-ever goal for the club on New Year's Day 2011 in the basement battle against Wolverhampton Wanderers, sealing their 2–0 victory with a 15-yard strike eleven minutes from the full-time whistle.

Sears featured in all of West Ham's January 2011 fixtures, but fell out of favour, before returning to action for the Hammer's 5–1 FA Cup win against Burnley on 21 February. Having started the game, Sears scored in the 90th minute to complete the scoring for his side and seal their place in the quarter-finals. West Ham were relegated from the Premier League, finishing the season in 20th position. Sears ended his season with two goals in 15 games for the Hammers.

==== 2011–12 season ====
In spite of the Hammers' relegation to the Championship, Sears remained with the club, where he scored the only goal of the game in a pre-season friendly victory over F.C. Copenhagen in Denmark. He also scored in their 2–0 friendly home win against Real Zaragoza on 30 July. New West Ham manager Sam Allardyce handed Sears a start for their opening Championship fixture on 7 August, a 1–0 home defeat to Cardiff City. However, after making twelve first team appearances, Sears began to find his chances limited by new arrivals in the January transfer window.

==== Colchester United (loan) ====
League One side Colchester United signed Sears in an emergency loan signing from West Ham on 17 February 2012 for one month. He made his debut the following day in a 3–2 away defeat to Yeovil Town. The U's extended Sears loan stay until the end of the season, but the striker had only started three games until that point, with Sears targeting a run in the team when his next opportunity arose.

Sears scored his first goal in over a year with an 81st minute penalty which secured a 1–1 draw with Hartlepool United on 6 April. Two games later, Sears netted again in Colchester's 4–2 defeat of Tranmere Rovers in their final home game of the 2011–12 season. Sears' solo effort ended a streak of eleven League One matches without a win. He ended his loan stint with the U's having scored twice in eleven appearances.

In June 2012, Sears left West Ham United by mutual consent. He had made 58 appearances in all competitions, scoring three goals.

=== Colchester United ===
==== 2012–13 season ====
On 4 July 2012, Colchester United confirmed the permanent signing of Sears from West Ham United on a three-year deal following his release from the Hammers. His U's career got off to a goalscoring start, with a brace in Colchester's 6–0 opening pre-season friendly against Heybridge Swifts on 14 July. He scored his third goal in two games in their 3–2 win against Vitesse Arnhem in the Netherlands on 18 July, before facing his former club West Ham for the first time since leaving in a friendly at the Colchester Community Stadium, a game which the Hammers edged 2–1. He described the experience of playing against his former employers as "a bit surreal". Sears was on target again in Colchester's 2–1 win at Maldon & Tiptree on 28 July and then scored a further brace against Derby County on 3 August in a 2–2 draw.

Sears made his full-time debut for Colchester on 18 August in their 0–0 away draw with Preston North End. He scored his first goal in his second stint with the club in the Football League Trophy defeat to Northampton Town on 9 October, scoring Colchester's goal in the 2–1 loss, with his first league goal arriving as the opener in Colchester's 3–2 defeat to Crewe Alexandra at Gresty Road on 10 November. Sears netted in the following game to bring his tally to three for the season when the U's hosted Bury on 17 November, scoring the second goal in a 2–0 victory. His next goal came in the U's 2–1 home defeat to his former club Scunthorpe United on 12 January 2013, a game in which the club set a record with their ninth consecutive league defeat. However, Sears netted in the 89th minute of their next game, a 2–0 win against Walsall to earn his fifth of the season, converting a low cross from George Porter. He scored from the penalty spot to help Colchester on their way to another three points in their next match against Portsmouth in their 3–2 win at Fratton Park on 2 February. Sears form continued on 9 February with his fourth goal in five matches, his close range effort proving decisive in their 1–0 home victory against Preston. He scored his eighth and final goal of the season on 26 February in a 2–0 home win against Yeovil Town. Sears said of his good form that "this is the first time in a long while I've really been enjoying it [playing]". A short time after, he suffered a knee injury that kept him out of action for seven games, making his return as a substitute in a 3–1 defeat to Notts County on 13 April as Colchester battled for League One survival. Sears ended his first full season with the club with eight goals in 37 appearances in all competitions.

==== 2013–14 season ====
Sears scored his first pre-season goal for Colchester in their 2–1 win against Maldon & Tiptree, having scored in the same fixture with the same result last season. Sears opened his League One account for the 2013–14 season in a 1–1 draw with Sheffield United at Bramall Lane on 17 August and followed this up by scoring an equaliser in another 1–1 draw with Carlisle United at home six days later. Sears missed two games with a groin injury in September, but he returned to action on 14 September in Colchester's trip to Bradford City. Sears scored his third goal of the season with the opening goal in Colchester's 1–1 draw with Crawley Town on 21 September, and then scored his fourth goal in a 1–1 draw at home to Walsall on 12 October.

A hamstring problem forced Sears to limp from the pitch after just 30 minutes of their 1–1 away draw with Shrewsbury Town on 22 October, Having seemingly recovered from the hamstring injury, Sears was selected to face Preston North End on 23 November, but he broke down after just 28 minutes in the game. The recurrence of that injury kept him out of the side until 11 January 2014, where he featured as a late substitute in a 3–0 victory over Gillingham. He scored with the last kick of the game after five minutes of injury time to bring his goal count to five for the season. His sixth goal came as the opener in a 2–1 home victory against his former club Coventry on 8 March, netting after five minutes, before collecting his seventh of the season against Bristol City on 22 March with a levelling goal in the sides' 2–2 draw, securing a point with an effort from 20-yards after being brought on when the U's had a two-goal deficit. He scored again on 5 April as his side fell to a 2–1 defeat at home to Tranmere Rovers, and scored twice in Colchester's relegation-battle tie with Stevenage on 12 April. Sears scored on the stroke of half-time to level the scores at 1–1, before following up a goal from Jabo Ibehre to hand the U's a 3–1 lead in the game, which eventually ended 3–2. He again scored twice to bring his total number for the season to twelve goals, as Colchester won 4–1 against already-promoted Brentford on 26 April.

==== 2014–15 season ====
2014–15 pre-season began with an opening fixture goal for Sears in the U's 4–1 win at Brantham Athletic on 12 July 2014, before scoring a brace in the 8–0 rout at Heybridge Swifts three days later. He scored again on 17 July with a penalty against Sudbury, before scoring in his fourth consecutive match with four goals in an 8–1 win over Leiston on 19 July. He scored his first goal of the campaign in League One during a 2–1 defeat to Notts County at Meadow Lane on 19 August. He scored his second goal of the season in a 3–1 home defeat to Peterborough United on 30 August, reducing the U's deficit at 2–1, and then secured his third goal of the season on 13 September when Colchester defeated Leyton Orient 2–0 at Brisbane Road. He continued his good scoring form when he tapped home a spilled save from Sheffield United goalkeeper Mark Howard in an eventual 3–2 defeat to the Blades on 16 September. His fifth goal of the season began proceedings in a 3–0 win away to Crewe Alexandra on 27 September when he converted a Sanchez Watt cross from six yards. In the Football League Trophy, Sears scored his sixth goal of the season with a late equaliser in a 3–3 draw with Gillingham on 8 October, slotting home Elliott Hewitt's low cross. He scored the equaliser from the edge of the box in a 1–1 draw with Scunthorpe United at Glanford Park on 18 October, before scoring his eighth of the season with an 87th-minute winner at the Community Stadium against Chesterfield on 21 October. He earned a consolation goal for his side in their 2–1 home reverse by Port Vale on 1 November, but took his goal tally into double figures for the season in the next match on 9 November when Colchester faced Gosport Borough in the FA Cup first round. Having already provided an assist for Sanchez Watt and with Colchester 2–0 up, Sears converted a penalty kick after he was brought down in the area. He scored again in the 78th minute to restore a three-goal cushion for his side, tapping home into an empty net in a match that eventually ended 6–3. He scored his fourth goal in three games in the U's 3–2 away defeat to Barnsley on 14 November. After not scoring for all of December as Colchester fell into the relegation positions, Sears' 13th goal of the campaign finally arrived as a consolation in the U's 3–1 FA Cup defeat to Cardiff City at the Cardiff City Stadium on 2 January 2015 following a neat passing move. He scored his tenth League One goal and 14th of the season with the opener in Colchester's 2–0 away victory over Peterborough on 10 January.

=== Ipswich Town ===
With his deal at Colchester set to expire in the summer of 2015, Sears signed a 2 1/2-year contract with Championship side Ipswich Town for a transfer fee of £100,000 on 16 January 2015. After making his debut on 17 January in Ipswich's 3–1 win over Millwall at The Den, where he came on as a substitute and provided the assist for Jonathan Parr's goal. He scored his first goal for the Blues in their 3–2 defeat to Brighton & Hove Albion from the bench on 21 January. Sears finished with nine goals in his debut season and formed a partnership with League top-scorer Daryl Murphy as Town reached the play-offs.

His pace and versatility was at the fore at the beginning of the 2015–2016 season as he scored four goals in his first six games. In December, he scored after 16 seconds as Fulham were defeated 2–1 at Craven Cottage on 15 December 2015. He scored 6 goals in 47 appearances during the 2015–2016 season.

He scored his first goal of the 2016–2017 season on the 18 October 2016, in a 2–0 win over Burton Albion, ending a run of 38 matches without a goal. His goal scoring form improved during the second half of the season. He scored 7 goals in 43 appearances over the course of the 2016–2017 season.

Sears continued to feature as a regular in the first-team during the 2017–2018 season. Primarily playing out wide, he experienced another goal drought over the majority of the season. He scored his first goal of the season on the 28 April 2018, in a 4–0 win over Reading at the Madejski Stadium. He scored his second goal in as many games on the final day of the season, netting the opening goal in a 2–2 draw with Middlesbrough at Portman Road.

After the arrival of new manager Paul Lambert during the 2018–19 season, following the departure of former manager Paul Hurst, Sears enjoyed a good run of form, including winning the Championship goal of the month for his 30-yard strike against Aston Villa at Villa Park on 26 January 2019, a goal which also won him Ipswich's goal of the season award for the 2018–19 season. Sears was stretchered off in an East Anglian derby against Norwich in February 2019, and was expected to be out for up to twelve months with a cruciate ligament injury. On 31 July 2019, Sears signed a new two-year contract at Portman Road, with the option of a further year extension.

After 10 months out due to injury, Sears made his return to the first team on 26 December 2019, coming on as a second-half substitute in a 0–0 home draw to Gillingham. He scored his first goal of the season on his first league start, netting in a 1–2 away loss to Blackpool at Bloomfield Road. He made 12 appearances during the season following his return from injury.

Sears scored a brace in the opening game of the 2020–21 season in a 3–0 win against Bristol Rovers in an EFL Cup first round tie. After five and a half seasons at the club, Sears was released at the end of the season. He finished his Ipswich career having scored 34 goals in 218 appearances.

=== Return to Colchester United ===
On 15 June 2021, Sears returned to former club Colchester United following his release from Ipswich, signing a two-year contract. He made his third debut for the U's on 7 August 2021 in a 0–0 draw away at Carlisle United. He scored his first goal since his return to the club on 17 August in Colchester's 1–1 draw with Mansfield Town.

In that 2021/22 season, Sears ended with 17 goals from 53 appearances.

In the 2022/23 season Sears was mostly restricted to appearances off the bench, scoring just four goals as Colchester struggled near the bottom of the table. In a rare start Sears missed a 91st-minute penalty in a 0–1 defeat against relegation rivals Rochdale.

At the end of the season Sears was released by Colchester.

=== Dagenham & Redbridge ===
In September 2023, Sears signed for National League team Dagenham & Redbridge on a contract until the end of the 2023–24 season. He departed the club by mutual consent in March 2024.

=== Braintree Town ===
Later that month, after leaving Dagenham & Redbridge, Sears opted to join National League South side, Braintree Town.

=== Chatham Town ===
On 19 July 2024, Sears joined Isthmian League Premier Division side Chatham Town.

=== Maldon & Tiptree ===
On 17 June 2025, Sears agreed to join Isthmian League North Division side Maldon & Tiptree. In his first season at the club, he scored 33 goals in all competitions, including 29 goals in the league as he won the Golden Boot, helping the Jammers to lift the league title.

=== Brentwood Town ===
On 6 August 2026, Sears joined Isthmian League Premier Division club Brentwood Town.

== International career ==
Sears made his England under-19s debut on 11 September 2007 when the Young Lions defeated Belarus 4–0. He came on as a substitute for Andy Carroll in the tie held at the City Ground, Nottingham. He was once again called up to the England under-19 side in February 2008 for a friendly with Croatia at the County Ground, Swindon. He again came on as substitute in the 2–0 victory held on 5 February, replacing Febian Brandy. Sears made his first start for the under-19s in England's elite qualification group win against Poland on 26 May, opening the scoring after 29 minutes and sealing the victory with an 85th minute penalty. He also appeared in England's 1–0 win over Serbia on 28 May. Sears again made an appearance in their 0–0 draw with Belarus to seal qualification for the 2008 UEFA European Under-19 Championship. Sears then featured in the finals held in Czech Republic, starting in the Young Lions 2–0 defeat to the host nation on 14 July 2008. He started for England in their 0–0 draw with Italy on 17 July, before scoring a penalty in his final under-19s appearance on 20 July as England beat Greece 3–0, a result which was not enough to see England qualify for the competition semi-finals. Sears scored three goals in eight appearances for the under-19 side.

Alongside teammates Junior Stanislas and James Tomkins, Sears was called up to the England under-20 team on 31 March 2009 to face Italy. He played his one and only under-20 game in the match held at Loftus Road on 1 April as England won 2–0.

Sears was named in Stuart Pearce's England under-21 squad to face Netherlands in a friendly in Groningen on 11 August 2009, having impressed Pearce with his early season displays during his loan with Crystal Palace. He made his debut at the age of nineteen in the 0–0 draw with the Jong Oranje, coming on as a second-half substitute for fellow West Ham player Junior Stanislas and playing for seven minutes.

Sears made his second appearance in a competitive qualifying fixture for the 2011 European Under-21 Championship against Macedonia on 4 September 2009. He came on as a half-time substitute for Fabrice Muamba, and later scored from six yards to level the scores at 1–1, with the match eventually ending 2–1 to England. He made his third and final appearance at under-21 level on 8 September in England's 1–1 qualifying draw with Greece, replacing Danny Welbeck after 75 minutes. Sears was provisionally selected for the 2011 Finals in Denmark, but did not make the final squad.

== Career statistics ==
As of end of 2025–26 season

Appearances and goals by club, season and competition
Club	Season	League			FA Cup		League Cup		Other		Total	
Club	Season	Division	Apps	Goals	Apps	Goals	Apps	Goals	Apps	Goals	Apps	Goals
West Ham United	2007–08	Premier League	7	1	0	0	0	0	—		7	1
West Ham United	2008–09	Premier League	17	0	3	0	2	0	—		22	0
West Ham United	2009–10	Premier League	1	0	1	0	—		—		2	0
West Ham United	2010–11	Premier League	11	1	2	1	2	0	—		15	2
West Ham United	2011–12	Championship	10	0	1	0	1	0	—		12	0
West Ham United	Total		46	2	7	1	5	0	0	0	58	3
Crystal Palace (loan)	2009–10	Championship	18	0	—		1	0	—		19	0
Coventry City (loan)	2009–10	Championship	10	0	—		—		—		10	0
Scunthorpe United (loan)	2010–11	Championship	9	0	—		—		—		9	0
Colchester United (loan)	2011–12	League One	11	2	—		—		—		11	2
Colchester United	2012–13	League One	35	7	1	0	0	0	1 (Note: Appearance in Football League Trophy)	1	37	8
Colchester United	2013–14	League One	32	12	0	0	0	0	0	0	32	12
Colchester United	2014–15	League One	24	10	3	3	1	0	1	1	29	14
Colchester United	Total		102	31	4	3	1	0	2	2	109	36
Ipswich Town	2014–15	Championship	21	9	0	0	0	0	2 (Note: Appearances in Championship play-offs)	0	23	9
Ipswich Town	2015–16	Championship	45	6	1	0	1	0	—		47	6
Ipswich Town	2016–17	Championship	40	7	2	0	1	0	—		43	7
Ipswich Town	2017–18	Championship	36	2	1	0	0	0	—		37	2
Ipswich Town	2018–19	Championship	24	6	1	0	1	0	—		26	6
Ipswich Town	2019–20	League One	11	1	0	0	0	0	1 (Note: Appearance(s) in EFL Trophy)	0	12	1
Ipswich Town	2020–21	League One	26	1	1	0	1	2	1	0	29	3
Ipswich Town	Total		203	32	6	0	4	2	4	0	218	34
Colchester United	2021–22	League Two	45	14	2	2	1	0	5	1	53	17
Colchester United	2022–23	League Two	31	2	1	0	0	0	2	2	33	4
Colchester United	Total		76	16	3	2	1	0	7	3	86	21
Dagenham & Redbridge	2023–24	National League	21	1	1	0	—		1 (Note: Appearance in FA Trophy)	0	23	1
Braintree Town	2023–24	National League South	10	1	—		—		3 (Note: Appearances in National League South play-offs)	1	13	2
Chatham Town	2024–25	Isthmian League Premier Division	39	21	3	2	—		6	1	48	24
Maldon & Tiptree	2025–26	Isthmian League North Division	41	29	6	4	—		1	0	48	33
Career total			575	133	30	12	12	2	29	7	641	154

== Honours ==
Braintree Town

- National League South play-offs: 2024

Maldon & Tiptree

- Isthmian League North Division: 2025–26

Individual

- West Ham United Young Player of the Year: 2010–11
- EFL Championship Goal of the Month: January 2019
- Ipswich Town Goal of the Season: 2018–19
