= Chris Smith (footballer, born 1998) =

English footballer

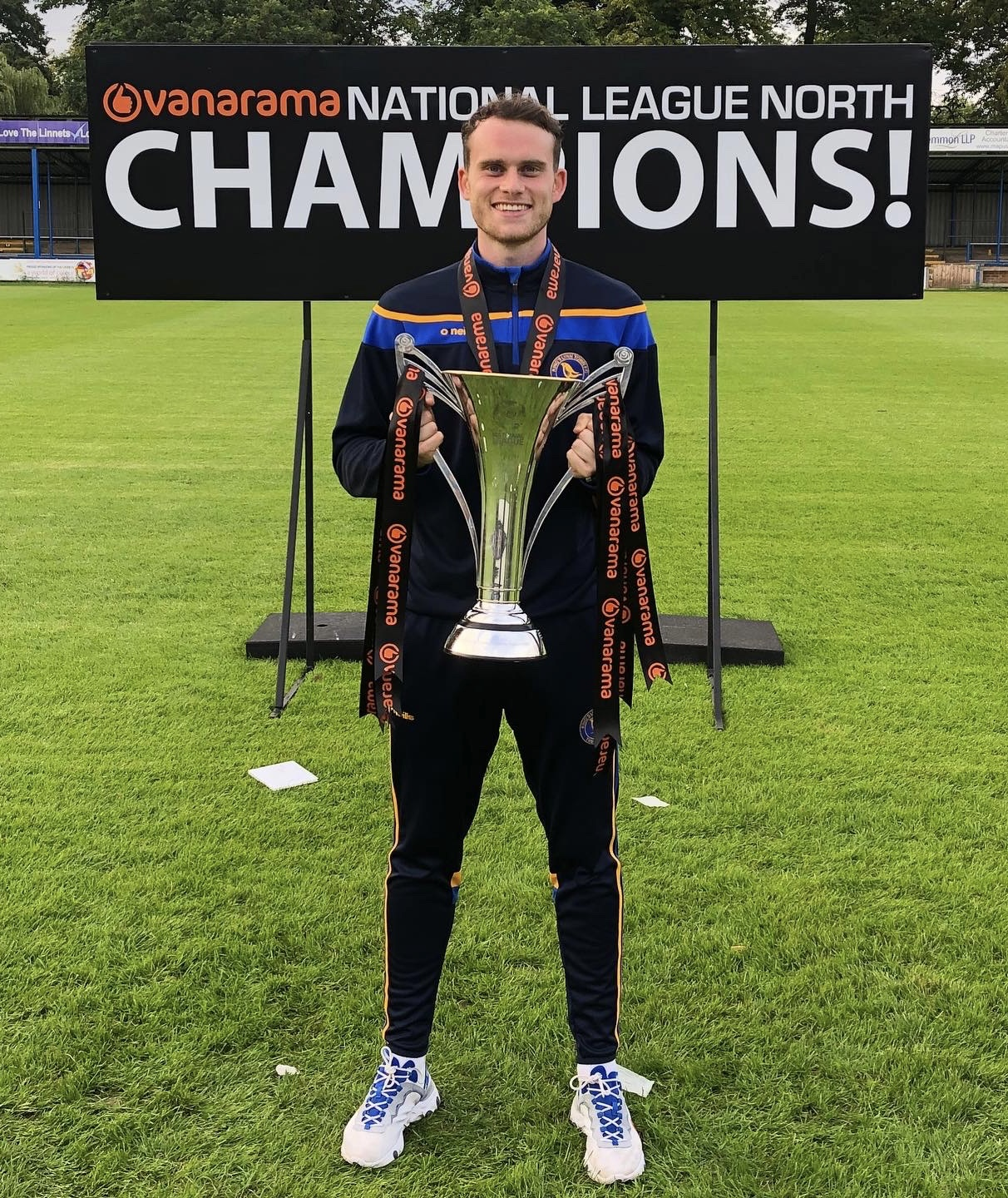

Personal information
- Full name: Christopher David Rawes Smith
- Date of birth: 21 February 1998 (age 28)
- Place of birth: Ipswich, England
- Position: Centre-back

Team information
- Current team: Hemel Hempstead Town

Youth career
- 2006–2017: Ipswich Town

Senior career*
Years	Team	Apps	(Gls)
2017–2019	Ipswich Town	0	(0)
2017–2018	→ Chelmsford City (loan)	19	(0)
2018	→ Aldershot Town (loan)	5	(0)
2019–2021	King's Lynn Town	27	(0)
2021–2022	Kettering Town		
2023–	Hemel Hempstead Town	51	(2)
- * Club domestic league appearances and goals

Christopher David Rawes Smith (born 21 February 1998) is an English professional footballer who plays as a defender for Hemel Hempstead Town.

== Club career ==
=== Ipswich Town ===
Born in Ipswich, Smith became a schoolboy player with Ipswich Town in 2006 and then became a full academy player with Town in July 2014, signing a two-year scholarship, before he signed a one-year pro deal in July 2016, and then signed another one-year deal for the 2017–18 season. He made his Ipswich Town debut on 22 August 2017 as a second-half substitute in an EFL Cup match at Crystal Palace. He was released by Ipswich at the end of the 2018–19 season.

==== Chelmsford City (loan) ====
On 21 September 2017, Smith joined Chelmsford City. He was recalled from his loan period in January 2018. After featuring on the bench twice upon his return to Ipswich, Smith returned on loan to Chelmsford until the end of the season. On 13 April 2018, after making 28 appearances in all competitions for Chelmsford, Smith was once again recalled from loan by Ipswich.

==== Aldershot Town (loan) ====
On 26 July 2018, Smith joined National League side Aldershot Town on a short-term loan deal until December 2018.

=== King's Lynn Town ===
He signed for King's Lynn Town on 19 July 2019, following his release by Ipswich.

=== Kettering Town ===
On 21 June 2021, Smith signed for Kettering Town.

=== Hemel Hempstead Town ===
Ahead of the 2023–24 season, Smith joined Hemel Hempstead Town.

== Personal life ==
Smith attended Kesgrave High School, later going onto study mechanical engineering at Loughborough University.

== Career statistics ==
As of match played 12 December 2020

Appearances and goals by club, season and competition
Club	Season	League			FA Cup		League Cup		Other		Total	
Club	Season	Division	Apps	Goals	Apps	Goals	Apps	Goals	Apps	Goals	Apps	Goals
Ipswich Town	2017–18	Championship	0	0	0	0	1	0	—		1	0
Ipswich Town	2018–19	Championship	0	0	0	0	0	0	—		0	0
Ipswich Town	Total		0	0	0	0	1	0	0	0	1	0
Chelmsford City (loan)	2017–18	National League South	19	0	4	0	—		5 (Note: Appearance(s) in FA Trophy)	0	28	0
Aldershot Town (loan)	2018–19	National League	5	0	0	0	—		0	0	5	0
King's Lynn Town	2019–20	National League North	16	0	0	0	—		1	0	17	0
King's Lynn Town	2020–21	National League	11	0	2	0	—		0	0	13	0
King's Lynn Town	Total		27	0	2	0	1	0	1	0	30	0
Career total			51	0	6	0	1	0	6	0	64	0

== Honours ==
King's Lynn Town

- National League North: 2019–20
