= 2018–19 Ipswich Town F.C. season =

Ipswich Town
2018–19 season
- Owner: Marcus Evans
- Manager: Paul Hurst (until 25 October 2018); Bryan Klug (caretaker) (25–27 October 2018); Paul Lambert (from 27 October 2018)
- Stadium: Portman Road
- Championship: 24th (relegated)
- FA Cup: Third round
- EFL Cup: First round
- Top goalscorer: League: Gwion Edwards / Freddie Sears (6); All: Gwion Edwards / Freddie Sears (6)
- Highest home attendance: 25,690 (vs Norwich City, 2 Sep 2018, EFL Championship)
- Lowest home attendance: 13,612 (vs Middlesbrough, 2 Oct 2018, EFL Championship)
- Average home league attendance: 17,760
Home colours	Away colours

The 2018–19 season was Ipswich Town's 17th consecutive season in the second tier of English football and 141st year in existence. Along with competing in the Championship, the club also participated in the FA Cup, going out in the third round, and League Cup, in which they were eliminated in the first round.

The season covers the period from 1 July 2018 to 30 June 2019.

== Kits ==
Supplier: Adidas / Sponsor: Magical Vegas (chest), East Anglian Children's Hospices (back), Nicholas Estates (shorts)

Home	Away	Away alt.1	Away alt.2

== First-team squad ==
Note: Flags indicate national team as defined under FIFA eligibility rules; some limited exceptions apply. Players may hold more than one non-FIFA nationality.

No.	Pos.	Nation	Player
1	GK	ENG	Dean Gerken
3	DF	DEN	Jonas Knudsen
4	DF	ENG	Luke Chambers (captain)
5	DF	ENG	Matthew Pennington (on loan from Everton)
6	MF	ENG	Trevoh Chalobah (on loan from Chelsea)
7	MF	WAL	Gwion Edwards
8	MF	ENG	Cole Skuse (vice-captain)
9	FW	ENG	Kayden Jackson
10	FW	WAL	Ellis Harrison
11	MF	ENG	Jon Nolan
12	DF	ENG	Jordan Spence
14	FW	ENG	Will Keane (on loan from Hull City)
15	MF	ENG	Teddy Bishop
16	MF	ENG	Tristan Nydam
18	MF	ENG	Grant Ward
20	FW	ENG	Freddie Sears
21	MF	ENG	Flynn Downes

No.	Pos.	Nation	Player
22	DF	COD	Aristote Nsiala
23	MF	ENG	Andre Dozzell
24	MF	ENG	Tom Adeyemi
25	DF	AUS	Callum Elder (on loan from Leicester City)
27	DF	ENG	Josh Emmanuel
30	DF	ENG	Myles Kenlock
31	MF	IRL	Alan Judge
33	GK	POL	Bartosz Białkowski
35	FW	ENG	Ben Morris
36	MF	ENG	Jack Lankester
39	DF	WAL	James Collins
41	DF	ENG	James Bree (on loan from Aston Villa)
42	MF	TUN	Idris El Mizouni
44	MF	WAL	Emyr Huws
45	FW	GER	Collin Quaner (on loan from Huddersfield Town)
49	MF	JAM	Simon Dawkins

=== Left club during season ===
Note: Flags indicate national team as defined under FIFA eligibility rules; some limited exceptions apply. Players may hold more than one non-FIFA nationality.

No.	Pos.	Nation	Player
2	DF	LCA	Janoi Donacien (on loan to Accrington Stanley)
14	MF	ENG	Jordan Graham (loan return to Wolverhampton Wanderers)
17	MF	ENG	Danny Rowe (on loan to Lincoln City)
19	MF	ENG	Jordan Roberts (on loan to Lincoln City)

No.	Pos.	Nation	Player
25	MF	ENG	Tayo Edun (loan return to Fulham)
32	DF	ENG	Luke Woolfenden (on loan to Swindon Town)
39	FW	IRL	Jonathan Walters (loan return to Burnley)

== First-team coaching staff ==
Until 25 October:

Position	Name
Manager	(England) Paul Hurst
Assistant manager	(Scotland) Chris Doig
Goalkeeping coach	(England) Darren Smith
Fitness Coach	(England) Nathan Winder
Head physiotherapist	(England) Matt Byard
Assistant Head Physiotherapist	(England) Alex Chapman
First-team Physiotherapist	(England) Chris Skitt
Kitman	(England) James Pullen

From 27 October:

Position	Name
Manager	(Scotland) Paul Lambert
Assistant manager	(Scotland) Stuart Taylor
First-team Coach	(England) Matt Gill
Goalkeeping coach	(England) Jimmy Walker
Head of Athletic Performance & Sports Science	(Scotland) Jim Henry
Strength & conditioning Coach	(England) Tom Walsh
Head physiotherapist	(England) Matt Byard
Assistant Head Physiotherapist	(England) Alex Chapman
Head of performance Analysis	(England) Will Stephenson
First-team Assistant Analyst	(England) George Buckley
Recruitment Analyst	(England) Alex Hood
Kitman	(England) James Pullen

== Pre-season ==
A pre-season friendly with Milton Keynes Dons was announced on 17 May 2018. Further matches with Braintree Town and Crawley Town were announced a day later.

8 July 2018 Friendly	Kilmarnock	0–1	Ipswich Town	La Manga, Spain
BST		Report	Garner	Attendance: 0

14 July 2018 Friendly	Braintree Town	2–0	Ipswich Town	Braintree
15:00 BST	Tajbakhsh 12', 64'	Report		Stadium: Cressing Road; Attendance: 581; Referee: Rob Whitton

17 July 2018 Friendly	Crawley Town	0–1	Ipswich Town	East Grinstead
19:30 BST		Report	Ward 5'	Stadium: East Court

21 July 2018 Friendly	Barnet	0–1	Ipswich Town	Canons Park
15:00 BST		Report	Kenlock 68'	Stadium: The Hive Stadium

24 July 2018 Friendly	Milton Keynes Dons	0–1	Ipswich Town	Milton Keynes
19:45 BST		Report	Sears 57' (pen.)	Stadium: Stadium MK

28 July 2018 Friendly	Ipswich Town	1–2	West Ham United	Ipswich
15:00 BST	Harrison 16'	Report	Anderson 4'; Arnautović 70'	Stadium: Portman Road; Attendance: 15,246

== Competitions ==
=== EFL Championship ===
==== League table ====
Pos	Team	Pld	W	D	L	GF	GA	GD	Pts	Promotion, qualification or relegation
19	Queens Park Rangers	46	14	9	23	53	71	−18	51	
20	Reading	46	10	17	19	49	66	−17	47	
21	Millwall	46	10	14	22	48	64	−16	44	
22	Rotherham United (R)	46	8	16	22	52	83	−31	40	Relegation to EFL League One
23	Bolton Wanderers (R)	46	8	8	30	29	78	−49	32 (Note: Brentford were awarded a 1–0 win over Bolton due to Bolton's inability to hold the fixture.)	Relegation to EFL League One
24	Ipswich Town (R)	46	5	16	25	36	77	−41	31	Relegation to EFL League One

Source: Sky Sports Archived 25 September 2019 at the Wayback Machine
Rules for classification: 1) Points; 2) Goal difference; 3) Number of goals scored; 4) Head-to-head results
(R) Relegated

==== Results summary ====
Overall								Home						Away					
Pld	W	D	L	GF	GA	GD	Pts	W	D	L	GF	GA	GD	W	D	L	GF	GA	GD
46	5	16	25	36	77	−41	31	3	11	9	22	31	−9	2	5	16	14	46	−32

Last updated: 5 May 2019.
Source: BBC

==== Results by matchday ====
Matchday	1	2	3	4	5	6	7	8	9	10	11	12	13	14	15	16	17	18	19	20	21	22	23	24	25	26	27	28	29	30	31	32	33	34	35	36	37	38	39	40	41	42	43	44	45	46
Ground	H	A	H	A	A	H	A	H	H	A	H	A	H	A	A	H	A	H	H	A	A	H	H	A	A	H	H	A	A	H	A	H	H	A	H	A	A	H	H	A	A	H	A	H	A	H
Result	D	L	D	L	L	D	L	D	D	D	L	W	L	L	L	D	D	L	L	L	L	W	D	L	L	L	W	L	L	L	L	D	D	D	L	D	D	D	L	W	L	D	L	L	L	W
Position	9	20	16	20	24	23	24	24	23	22	23	23	24	24	24	24	24	24	24	24	24	24	24	24	24	24	24	24	24	24	24	24	24	24	24	24	24	24	24	24	24	24	24	24	24	24

Updated to match(es) played on 27 April 2019. Source: Statto.com
A = Away; H = Home; W = Win; D = Draw; L = Loss

==== Matches ====
4 August 2018 1	Ipswich Town	2–2	Blackburn Rovers	Ipswich
15:00 BST	Edwards 5'; Harrison (yellow card) 35'; Chambers (yellow card) 72'; Edun 90+1'	Report	Graham 20'; Dack 29'; Bennett (yellow card) 53'; Lenihan (yellow card) 88'; Smallwood (yellow card) 90'	Stadium: Portman Road; Attendance: 18,940; Referee: Andy Davies

11 August 2018 2	Rotherham United	1–0	Ipswich Town	Rotherham
15:00 BST	Palmer (yellow card) 42'; Vaulks (yellow card) 71'; Smith 90'	Report		Stadium: New York Stadium; Attendance: 9,460; Referee: David Webb

18 August 2018 3	Ipswich Town	1–1	Aston Villa	Ipswich
15:00 BST	Chalobah 36'; Edun (yellow card) 29' (yellow-red card) 39'; Donacien (yellow card) 49'	Report	Kodjia 21'; Hutton (yellow card) 65'; McGinn (yellow card) 80'	Stadium: Portman Road; Attendance: 17,824; Referee: Tim Robinson

21 August 2018 4	Derby County	2–0	Ipswich Town	Derby
19:45 BST	Ledley 59'; Lawrence 68'	Report		Stadium: Pride Park Stadium; Attendance: 24,362; Referee: Scott Duncan

25 August 2018 5	Sheffield Wednesday	2–1	Ipswich Town	Owlerton
15:00 BST	João 16', 77'	Report	Nsiala 40' (red card) 75'	Stadium: Hillsborough Stadium; Attendance: 22,499; Referee: Jeremy Simpson

2 September 2018 6	Ipswich Town	1–1	Norwich City	Ipswich
12:00 BST	Edwards 57'	Report	Leitner 71'	Stadium: Portman Road; Attendance: 25,690; Referee: Robert Jones

15 September 2018 7	Hull City	2–0	Ipswich Town	Kingston-upon-Hull
15:00 BST	Bowen 3'; Irvine 89'	Report		Stadium: KCOM Stadium; Attendance: 11,650; Referee: Tony Harrington

18 September 2018 8	Ipswich Town	1–1	Brentford	Ipswich
19:45 BST	Jackson 73'	Report	Maupay 31'	Stadium: Portman Road; Attendance: 14,897; Referee: Darren Bond

22 September 2018 9	Ipswich Town	0–0	Bolton Wanderers	Ipswich
15:00 BST		Report	Wilson (red card) 34'	Stadium: Portman Road; Attendance: 14,755; Referee: Steve Martin

29 September 2018 10	Birmingham City	2–2	Ipswich Town	Birmingham
15:00 BST	Jutkiewicz 48', 68'	Report	Nolan 26'; Pennington 41' (red card) 88'	Stadium: St Andrew's; Attendance: 21,612; Referee: John Brooks

2 October 2018 11	Ipswich Town	0–2	Middlesbrough	Ipswich
19:45 BST		Report	Besic 12'; Downing 16'	Stadium: Portman Road; Attendance: 13,612; Referee: Andrew Madley

6 October 2018 12	Swansea City	2–3	Ipswich Town	Swansea
15:00 BST	Donacien 9' (o.g.); Celina 79'	Report	Edwards 27' van der Hoorn 31' (o.g.); Chalobah 84'	Stadium: Liberty Stadium; Attendance: 18,810; Referee: Oliver Langford

20 October 2018 13	Ipswich Town	0–2	Queens Park Rangers	Ipswich
15:00 BST		Report	Gerken 13' (o.g.); Hemed 45+2' (pen.)	Stadium: Portman Road; Attendance: 18,345; Referee: Geoff Eltringham

24 October 2018 14	Leeds United	2–0	Ipswich Town	Leeds
19:45 BST	Roofe 22'; Cooper 65'	Report		Stadium: Elland Road; Attendance: 29,082; Referee: Craig Pawson

27 October 2018 15	Millwall	3–0	Ipswich Town	Millwall
15:00 BST	Gregory 26', 51'; Leonard 70'	Report	Pennington (yellow card) 57'	Stadium: The Den; Attendance: 15,386; Referee: Robert Jones

3 November 2018 16	Ipswich Town	1–1	Preston North End	Ipswich
15:00 GMT	Chambers (yellow card) 36'; Sears 45' (pen.); Edwards (yellow card) 51'; Roberts (yellow card) 62'; Pennington (yellow card) 90+6'	Report	Maxwell (yellow card) 44' (yellow-red card) 75'; Johnson (yellow card) 45'; Pearson (yellow card) 57'; Gallagher 73'	Stadium: Portman Road; Attendance: 15,129; Referee: Andy Woolmer

10 November 2018 17	Reading	2–2	Ipswich Town	Reading
15:00 BST	Meite 7', 84'	Report	Edwards 5'; Sears 11'	Stadium: Madjeski Stadium; Attendance: 14,952; Referee: Darren Bond

23 November 2018 18	Ipswich Town	1–2	West Bromwich Albion	Ipswich
19:45 GMT	Jackson 85'	Report	Rodriguez 26'; Barnes 77'	Stadium: Portman Road; Attendance: 22,995; Referee: Keith Stroud

28 November 2018 19	Ipswich Town	2–3	Bristol City	Ipswich
19:45 GMT	Sears 32', 58'	Report	Bialkowski 55' (o.g.); Paterson 59'; Diedhiou 64'	Stadium: Portman Road; Attendance: 13,726; Referee: David Webb

1 December 2018 20	Nottingham Forest	2–0	Ipswich Town	West Bridgford
15:00 GMT	Grabban 9', 38'; Hefele (yellow card) 54'; Pantilimon (yellow card) 82'	Report	Skuse (yellow card) 45'	Stadium: The City Ground; Attendance: 27,873; Referee: James Linington

8 December 2018 21	Stoke City	2–0	Ipswich Town	Stoke-on-Trent
15:00 GMT	Ince 45+2'; Allen 60'	Report		Stadium: Bet365 Stadium; Attendance: 24,694; Referee: Geoff Eltringham

15 December 2018 22	Ipswich Town	1–0	Wigan Athletic	Ipswich
15:00 GMT	Chalobah (yellow card) 49'; Sears 67'; Chambers (yellow card) 73'; Roberts (yellow card) 84'	Report	Connolly (yellow card) 50'; Burn (yellow card) 90+3'	Stadium: Portman Road; Attendance: 14,640; Referee: Scott Duncan

22 December 2018 23	Ipswich Town	1–1	Sheffield United	Ipswich
15:00 GMT	Harrison 38'; Chalobah (yellow card) 40'; Spence (yellow card) 90+2'	Report	Sharp 47'; Basham (yellow card) 70'; Norwood (yellow card) 84'	Stadium: Portman Road; Attendance: 17,942; Referee: Andy Woolmer

22 December 2018 24	Queens Park Rangers	3–0	Ipswich Town	Shepherd's Bush
15:00 GMT	Wszołek 30'; Lynch 34'; Wells 74'	Report		Stadium: Loftus Road; Attendance: 14,584; Referee: Keith Stroud

29 December 2018 25	Middlesbrough	2–0	Ipswich Town	Middlesbrough
15:00 GMT	Hugill 37' (pen.); Tavernier (yellow card) 65' (goal) 72'	Report	Chalobah (yellow card) 18'; Downes (yellow card) 39'	Stadium: Riverside Stadium; Attendance: 23,334; Referee: Jeremy Simpson

1 January 2019 26	Ipswich Town	2–3	Millwall	Ipswich
15:00 GMT	Lankaster 2'; Jackson 89'	Report	Ferguson 60' (pen.); Morison (yellow card) 66'; Cooper 68'; Elliott 76'	Stadium: Portman Road; Attendance: 16,957; Referee: Steve Martin

12 January 2019 27	Ipswich Town	1–0	Rotherham United	Ipswich
15:00 GMT	Keane 31'	Report		Stadium: Portman Road; Attendance: 20,893; Referee: James Linington

19 January 2019 28	Blackburn Rovers	2–0	Ipswich Town	Blackburn
15:00 GMT	Graham 65' (pen.); Nuttall 74'	Report		Stadium: Ewood Park; Attendance: 12,762; Referee: Darren England

26 January 2019 29	Aston Villa	2–1	Ipswich Town	Aston
15:00 GMT	Abraham 6', 61' (pen.)	Report	Sears 76'	Stadium: Villa Park; Attendance: 33,653; Referee: Keith Stroud

2 February 2019 30	Ipswich Town	0–1	Sheffield Wednesday	Ipswich
15:00 GMT	Downes (yellow card) 64'	Report	Hutchinson (yellow card) 54'; Bannan (yellow card) 61'; João 90'	Stadium: Portman Road; Attendance: 16,888; Referee: Oliver Langford

10 February 2019 31	Norwich City	3–0	Ipswich Town	Norwich
12:00 GMT	Hernández 2'; Lewis (yellow card) 60'; Pukki 65', 80'; Trybull (yellow card) 76'; Stiepermann (yellow card) 79'; Cantwell (yellow card) 90'	Report	Skuse (yellow card) 32'; Nolan (yellow card) 45+4'; Downes (yellow card) 90'	Stadium: Carrow Road; Attendance: 27,040; Referee: Peter Bankes

13 February 2019 32	Ipswich Town	1–1	Derby County	Ipswich
19:45 GMT	Nolan 55'; Bishop (yellow card) 57'; Chalobah (yellow card) 63'; Pennington (yellow card) 90+4'	Report	Lawrence 2'; Waghorn (yellow card) 21'; Holmes (yellow card) 57'; Bennett (yellow card) 85'; Johnson (yellow card) 90+4'	Stadium: Portman Road; Attendance: 18,604; Referee: Andrew Madley

16 February 2019 33	Ipswich Town	1–1	Stoke City	Ipswich
15:00 GMT	Keane 90+2'	Report	McClean (yellow card) 33' (goal) 42'	Stadium: Portman Road; Attendance: 15,924; Referee: Scott Duncan

23 February 2019 34	Wigan Athletic	1–1	Ipswich Town	Wigan
15:00 GMT	Garner 90+1'	Report	Knudsen (red card) 25'; Keane 32' (pen.)	Stadium: DW Stadium; Attendance: 10,835; Referee: Lee Probert

2 March 2019 35	Ipswich Town	1–2	Reading	Ipswich
15:00 GMT	Edwards 83'	Report	Oliveira 19'; Barrow 90'	Stadium: Portman Road; Attendance: 23,003; Referee: Geoff Eltringham

9 March 2019 36	West Bromwich Albion	1–1	Ipswich Town	West Bromwich
15:00 GMT	Johansen 4'; Murphy (yellow card) 70'; Field (yellow card) 87'; Morrison (yellow card) 90'	Report	Knudsen (yellow card) 33'; Edwards (yellow card) 47'; Nolan 48'	Stadium: The Hawthorns; Attendance: 23,973; Referee: Andy Woolmer

12 March 2019 37	Bristol City	1–1	Ipswich Town	Bristol
19:45 GMT	Webster 32'; Hunt (yellow card) 90'	Report	Dozzell (yellow card) 30'; Kelly 68' (o.g.); Edwards (yellow card) 76'; El Mizouni (yellow card) 83'	Stadium: Ashton Gate Stadium; Attendance: 18,411; Referee: Darren Bond

16 March 2019 38	Ipswich Town	1–1	Nottingham Forest	Ipswich
15:00 GMT	Quaner 5'	Report	Nolan 31' (o.g.); Colback (yellow card) 84'; Benalouane (yellow card) 90+4'	Stadium: Portman Road; Attendance: 16,709; Referee: Keith Stroud

30 March 2019 39	Ipswich Town	0–2	Hull City	Ipswich
15:00 GMT	Edwards (yellow card) 29'	Report	Grosicki 14', 49'; Marshall (yellow card) 64' de Wijs (yellow card) 79'	Stadium: Portman Road; Attendance: 15,720; Referee: John Brooks

6 April 2019 40	Bolton Wanderers	1–2	Ipswich Town	Bolton
15:00 BST	Emmanuel 90+4' (o.g.)	Report	Quaner 33', 44'	Stadium: University of Bolton Stadium; Attendance: 17,811; Referee: Peter Bankes

10 April 2019 41	Brentford	2–0	Ipswich Town	Brentford
19:45 BST	Maupay 20'; Watkins 28'; Sørensen (yellow card) 74'	Report	Nsiala (yellow card) 54'	Stadium: Griffin Park; Attendance: 10,039; Referee: Andy Davies

13 April 2019 42	Ipswich Town	1–1	Birmingham City	Ipswich
15:00 BST	Edwards (yellow card) 31' (goal) 46'; Collins (yellow card) 42'; Skuse (yellow card) 44'; Chambers (yellow card) 45+2'; Nsiala (yellow card) 81'	Report	Jutkiewicz 7'; Davis (yellow card) 80'	Stadium: Portman Road; Attendance: 17,248; Referee: Jeremy Simpson

19 April 2019 43	Preston North End	4–0	Ipswich Town	Preston
15:00 BST	Robinson 6', 22'; Nmecha 56', 75'	Report	Kenlock (yellow card) 78'	Stadium: Deepdale; Attendance: 12,546; Referee: Stephen Martin

22 April 2019 44	Ipswich Town	0–1	Swansea City	Ipswich
15:00 BST	Nsiala (yellow card) 29'; Bree (yellow card) 61'	Report	Byers (yellow card) 16'; Fulton (yellow card) 20'; Routledge 57'; Dyer (yellow card) 90'	Stadium: Portman Road; Attendance: 17,247; Referee: Darren England

27 April 2019 45	Sheffield United	2–0	Ipswich Town	Sheffield
17:15 BST	Hogan 24'; O'Connell 71'	Report	Judge (yellow card) 45+2'	Stadium: Bramall Lane; Attendance: 30,140; Referee: Tim Robinson

5 May 2019 46	Ipswich Town	3–2	Leeds United	Ipswich
12:30 BST	Downes 30'; Dozzell 47'; Jackson (yellow card) 75'; Chambers (red card) 79'; Nsiala (yellow card) 84'; Quaner 90'	Report	Casilla (yellow card) 28'; Klich 45'; Dallas 76'	Stadium: Portman Road; Attendance: 20,895; Referee: Gavin Ward

=== FA Cup ===
The third round draw was made live on BBC by Ruud Gullit and Paul Ince from Stamford Bridge on 3 December 2018.

5 January 2019 Third round	Accrington Stanley	1–0	Ipswich Town	Accrington
15:00 GMT	Kee 76'	Report	Downes (yellow card) 25'	Stadium: Crown Ground; Attendance: 2,869; Referee: Dean Whitestone

=== EFL Cup ===
On 15 June 2018, the draw for the first round was made in Vietnam.

14 August 2018 First round	Exeter City	1–1 (4–2 p)	Ipswich Town	Exeter
19:45 BST	Brown 64'; Taylor (yellow card) 67'	Report	Jackson 37'; Knudsen (yellow card) 82'; Nsiala (yellow card) 83'	Stadium: St James Park; Attendance: 3,675; Referee: Brett Huxtable
	Penalties
	Taylor (penalty missed); Sweeney (penalty scored); Abrahams (penalty scored); Collins (penalty scored); Martin (penalty scored)		Bishop (penalty missed); Chambers (penalty scored); Jackson (penalty scored); Chalobah (penalty missed)

== Transfers ==
=== Transfers in ===
Date from	Position	Nationality	Name	From	Fee	Ref.
1 July 2018	LM	(England)	Jordan Roberts	(England) Crawley Town	Free transfer	
17 July 2018	LW	(Wales)	Gwion Edwards	(England) Peterborough United	Undisclosed (Note: Fee reported as £700,000)	
23 July 2018	CF	(Wales)	Ellis Harrison	(England) Bristol Rovers	Undisclosed (Note: Initial fee reported as £750,000, could potentially rise to £1,250,000 with add-ons)	
8 August 2018	CM	(England)	Jon Nolan	(England) Shrewsbury Town	Undisclosed (Note: Combined fee reported as £2,000,000 for Jon Nolan and Aristote Nsiala)	
8 August 2018	CB	(Democratic Republic of the Congo)	Aristote Nsiala	(England) Shrewsbury Town	Undisclosed	
9 August 2018	CF	(England)	Kayden Jackson	(England) Accrington Stanley	Undisclosed (Note: Initial fee reported as £1,600,000, could potentially rise to £2,000,000 with add-ons)	
3 January 2019	CB	(Saint Lucia)	Janoi Donacien	(England) Accrington Stanley	Undisclosed (Note: Fee reported as £750,000)	
9 January 2019	LW	(Jamaica)	Simon Dawkins	Free agent	Free transfer	
11 January 2019	CB	(Wales)	James Collins	Free agent	Free transfer	
14 January 2019	AM	(Republic of Ireland)	Alan Judge	(England) Brentford	Undisclosed	

=== Loans in ===
Start date	Position	Nationality	Name	From	End date	Ref.
1 July 2018	CB	(England)	Trevoh Chalobah	(England) Chelsea	31 May 2019	
31 July 2018	CB	(Saint Lucia)	Janoi Donacien	(England) Accrington Stanley	3 January 2019	
3 August 2018	DM	(England)	Tayo Edun	(England) Fulham	31 December 2018	
28 August 2018	LW	(England)	Jordan Graham	(England) Wolverhampton Wanderers	2 January 2019	
30 August 2018	RW	(Republic of Ireland)	Jonathan Walters	(England) Burnley	31 December 2018	
31 August 2018	CB	(England)	Matthew Pennington	(England) Everton	31 May 2019	
2 January 2019	LB	(Australia)	Callum Elder	(England) Leicester City	31 May 2019	
4 January 2019	CF	(England)	Will Keane	(England) Hull City	31 May 2019	
8 January 2019	CF	(Germany)	Collin Quaner	(England) Huddersfield Town	31 May 2019	
31 January 2019	RB	(England)	James Bree	(England) Aston Villa	31 May 2019	

=== Transfers out ===
Date from	Position	Nationality	Name	To	Fee	Ref.
28 June 2018	CB	(England)	Adam Webster	(England) Bristol City	£3,500,000 (Note: Fee could potentially rise to £8,000,000 with add-ons)	
1 July 2018	CM	(England)	James Blanchfield	(England) Dagenham & Redbridge	Free transfer	
1 July 2018	CM	(Mauritius)	Kévin Bru	(Cyprus) Apollon Limassol	Free transfer	
1 July 2018	LW	(The Gambia)	Mustapha Carayol	(Cyprus) Apollon Limassol	Free transfer	
1 July 2018	GK	(Wales)	Michael Crowe	(England) Preston North End	Free transfer	
1 July 2018	CM	(Republic of Ireland)	Stephen Gleeson	(Scotland) Aberdeen	Free transfer	
1 July 2018	GK	(England)	Nicholas Hayes	Free agent	Released	
1 July 2018	CM	(England)	Luke Hyam	(England) Southend United	Free transfer	
1 July 2018	CF	(Republic of Ireland)	David McGoldrick	(England) Sheffield United	Free transfer	
1 July 2018	LW	(New Zealand)	Monty Patterson	(United States) OKC Energy	Free transfer	
1 July 2018	AM	(England)	Mohammed Sagaf	(England) Barking	Free transfer	
1 July 2018	CB	(France)	Chris Goteni	Free agent	Released	
1 July 2018	AM	(England)	Ben Knight	(England) Manchester City	Undisclosed (Note: Initial fee reported as £700,000, could potentially rise to £1,000,000 with add-ons)	
8 August 2018	CF	(England)	Martyn Waghorn	(England) Derby County	£5,000,000 (Note: Fee could potentially rise to £7,500,000 with add-ons)	
9 August 2018	CF	(England)	Joe Garner	(England) Wigan Athletic	£1,250,000	
31 January 2019	AM	(Republic of Ireland)	Shane McLoughlin	(England) AFC Wimbledon	Free transfer	
11 March 2019	CM	(Mexico)	Marcelo Flores	(England) Arsenal	Compensation	

=== Loans out ===
Start date	Position	Nationality	Name	To	End date	Ref.
26 July 2018	CB	(England)	Chris Smith	(England) Aldershot Town	21 September 2018	
1 August 2018	CF	(Republic of Ireland)	Aaron Drinan	(England) Sutton United	1 January 2019	
2 August 2018	LB	(England)	Patrick Webber	(England) Braintree Town	29 December 2018	
28 August 2018	CM	(England)	Tristan Nydam	(Scotland) St Johnstone	1 January 2019	
31 August 2018	RB	(England)	Josh Emmanuel	(England) Shrewsbury Town	31 May 2019	
31 August 2018	CF	(England)	Ben Morris	(England) Forest Green Rovers	3 January 2019	
31 August 2018	CB	(England)	Luke Woolfenden	(England) Swindon Town	31 May 2019	
13 September 2018	LW	(Northern Ireland)	Conor McKendry	(England) Lowestoft Town	14 November 2018	
14 November 2018	RB	(Gibraltar)	Kian Ronan	(England) Mildenhall Town	15 December 2018	
17 January 2019	LW	(England)	Danny Rowe	(England) Lincoln City	31 May 2019	
18 January 2019	CB	(Saint Lucia)	Janoi Donacien	(England) Accrington Stanley	31 May 2019	
23 January 2019	LM	(England)	Jordan Roberts	(England) Lincoln City	31 May 2019	
13 February 2019	CF	(Republic of Ireland)	Aaron Drinan	(Republic of Ireland) Waterford	31 May 2019	
22 March 2019	GK	(England)	Harry Wright	(England) Chelmsford City	31 May 2019	

== Squad statistics ==
All statistics updated as of end of season

=== Appearances and goals ===
No.	Pos	Nat	Player	Total		Championship		FA Cup		League Cup	
No.	Pos	Nat	Player	Apps	Goals	Apps	Goals	Apps	Goals	Apps	Goals
Goalkeepers
1	GK	(England) ENG	Dean Gerken	18	0	18	0	0	0	0	0
33	GK	(Poland) POL	Bartosz Białkowski	30	0	28	0	1	0	1	0
Defenders
3	DF	(Denmark) DEN	Jonas Knudsen	29	0	27+1	0	0	0	1	0
4	DF	(England) ENG	Luke Chambers	44	0	43	0	0	0	1	0
5	DF	(England) ENG	Matthew Pennington	24	1	23	1	1	0	0	0
12	DF	(England) ENG	Jordan Spence	19	0	16+1	0	1	0	0+1	0
22	DF	(Democratic Republic of the Congo) COD	Aristote Nsiala	24	1	17+5	1	1	0	1	0
25	DF	(Australia) AUS	Callum Elder	5	0	3+1	0	1	0	0	0
27	DF	(England) ENG	Josh Emmanuel	4	0	4	0	0	0	0	0
30	DF	(England) ENG	Myles Kenlock	19	0	18+1	0	0	0	0	0
39	DF	(Wales) WAL	James Collins	6	0	6	0	0	0	0	0
41	DF	(England) ENG	James Bree	14	0	13+1	0	0	0	0	0
Midfielders
6	MF	(England) ENG	Trevoh Chalobah	44	2	35+8	2	0	0	1	0
7	MF	(Wales) WAL	Gwion Edwards	34	6	24+9	6	1	0	0	0
8	MF	(England) ENG	Cole Skuse	34	0	32+2	0	0	0	0	0
11	MF	(England) ENG	Jon Nolan	28	3	23+3	3	1	0	1	0
15	MF	(England) ENG	Teddy Bishop	20	0	13+5	0	0+1	0	0+1	0
16	MF	(England) ENG	Tristan Nydam	1	0	0+1	0	0	0	0	0
18	MF	(England) ENG	Grant Ward	15	0	11+3	0	0	0	1	0
21	MF	(England) ENG	Flynn Downes	30	1	21+8	1	1	0	0	0
23	MF	(England) ENG	Andre Dozzell	20	1	10+9	1	1	0	0	0
24	MF	(England) ENG	Tom Adeyemi	0	0	0	0	0	0	0	0
31	MF	(Republic of Ireland) IRL	Alan Judge	19	0	19	0	0	0	0	0
42	MF	(Tunisia) TUN	Idris El Mizouni	4	0	1+3	0	0	0	0	0
44	MF	(Wales) WAL	Emyr Huws	0	0	0	0	0	0	0	0
49	MF	(Jamaica) JAM	Simon Dawkins	2	0	0+2	0	0	0	0	0
Forwards
9	FW	(England) ENG	Kayden Jackson	38	4	14+22	3	1	0	1	1
10	FW	(Wales) WAL	Ellis Harrison	17	1	9+7	1	0+1	0	0	0
14	FW	(England) ENG	Will Keane	12	3	9+2	3	0+1	0	0	0
20	FW	(England) ENG	Freddie Sears	24	6	19+3	6	1	0	1	0
35	FW	(England) ENG	Ben Morris	1	0	0+1	0	0	0	0	0
36	FW	(England) ENG	Jack Lankester	11	1	5+6	1	0	0	0	0
45	FW	(Germany) GER	Collin Quaner	16	4	13+3	4	0	0	0	0
Players transferred out during the season
2	DF	(Saint Lucia) LCA	Janoi Donacien	11	0	9+1	0	0	0	1	0
32	DF	(England) ENG	Luke Woolfenden	1	0	0+1	0	0	0	0	0
14	MF	(England) ENG	Jordan Graham	4	0	3+1	0	0	0	0	0
17	MF	(England) ENG	Danny Rowe	4	0	0+3	0	0	0	0+1	0
19	MF	(England) ENG	Jordan Roberts	12	0	6+6	0	0	0	0	0
25	MF	(England) ENG	Tayo Edun	7	1	3+3	1	0	0	1	0
39	FW	(Republic of Ireland) IRL	Jonathan Walters	3	0	2+1	0	0	0	0	0

Last updated: end of season
Source: Competitions

=== Goalscorers ===
No.	Pos	Nat	Player	Championship	FA Cup	EFL Cup	Total
7	MF	(Wales)	Gwion Edwards	6	0	0	6
20	FW	(England)	Freddie Sears	6	0	0	6
9	FW	(England)	Kayden Jackson	3	0	1	4
45	FW	(Germany)	Collin Quaner	4	0	0	4
11	MF	(England)	Jon Nolan	3	0	0	3
14	FW	(England)	Will Keane	3	0	0	3
6	MF	(England)	Trevoh Chalobah	2	0	0	2
5	DF	(England)	Matthew Pennington	1	0	0	1
10	FW	(Wales)	Ellis Harrison	1	0	0	1
21	MF	(England)	Flynn Downes	1	0	0	1
22	DF	(Democratic Republic of the Congo)	Aristote Nsiala	1	0	0	1
23	MF	(England)	Andre Dozzell	1	0	0	1
25	DF	(England)	Tayo Edun	1	0	0	1
36	FW	(England)	Jack Lankester	1	0	0	1
Own goal				2	0	0	2
Total				36	0	1	37

=== Assists ===
No.	Pos	Nat	Player	Championship	FA Cup	EFL Cup	Total
20	FW	(England)	Freddie Sears	4	0	0	4
45	FW	(Germany)	Collin Quaner	3	0	0	3
4	DF	(England)	Luke Chambers	2	0	0	2
7	MF	(Wales)	Gwion Edwards	2	0	0	2
9	FW	(England)	Kayden Jackson	2	0	0	2
18	MF	(England)	Grant Ward	2	0	0	2
25	DF	(England)	Tayo Edun	1	0	1	2
6	MF	(England)	Trevoh Chalobah	1	0	0	1
8	MF	(England)	Cole Skuse	1	0	0	1
10	FW	(Wales)	Ellis Harrison	1	0	0	1
19	MF	(England)	Jordan Roberts	1	0	0	1
21	MF	(England)	Flynn Downes	1	0	0	1
30	DF	(England)	Myles Kenlock	1	0	0	1
31	MF	(Republic of Ireland)	Alan Judge	1	0	0	1
33	GK	(Poland)	Bartosz Białkowski	1	0	0	1
39	FW	(Republic of Ireland)	Jonathan Walters	1	0	0	1
41	DF	(England)	James Bree	1	0	0	1
Total				25	0	1	26

=== Clean sheets ===
Number	Nation	Name	Championship	FA Cup	EFL Cup	Total
1	(England)	Dean Gerken	3	0	0	3
Total			3	0	0	3

=== Disciplinary record ===
No.	Pos.	Name	Championship		FA Cup		EFL Cup		Total	
No.	Pos.	Name	Booked	Sent off (straight red)	Booked	Sent off (straight red)	Booked	Sent off (straight red)	Booked	Sent off (straight red)
2	DF	(Saint Lucia) Janoi Donacien	1	0	0	0	0	0	1	0
3	DF	(Denmark) Jonas Knudsen	4	1	0	0	1	0	5	1
4	DF	(England) Luke Chambers	8	1	0	0	0	0	8	1
5	DF	(England) Matthew Pennington	5	1	0	0	0	0	5	1
6	MF	(England) Trevoh Chalobah	6	0	0	0	0	0	6	0
7	MF	(Wales) Gwion Edwards	7	0	0	0	0	0	7	0
8	MF	(England) Cole Skuse	6	0	0	0	0	0	6	0
9	FW	(England) Kayden Jackson	2	0	0	0	0	0	2	0
10	FW	(Wales) Ellis Harrison	2	0	0	0	0	0	2	0
11	MF	(England) Jon Nolan	3	0	0	0	0	0	3	0
12	DF	(England) Jordan Spence	4	0	0	0	0	0	4	0
14	MF	(England) Jordan Graham	1	0	0	0	0	0	1	0
15	MF	(England) Teddy Bishop	1	0	0	0	0	0	1	0
19	MF	(England) Jordan Roberts	2	0	0	0	0	0	2	0
20	FW	(England) Freddie Sears	2	0	0	0	0	0	2	0
21	MF	(England) Flynn Downes	4	0	1	0	0	0	5	0
22	DF	(Democratic Republic of the Congo) Aristote Nsiala	6	1	0	0	1	0	7	1
23	MF	(England) Andre Dozzell	2	0	0	0	0	0	2	0
25	MF	(England) Tayo Edun	2	1	0	0	0	0	2	1
30	DF	(England) Myles Kenlock	3	0	0	0	0	0	3	0
31	MF	(Republic of Ireland) Alan Judge	1	0	0	0	0	0	1	0
39	DF	(Wales) James Collins	1	0	0	0	0	0	1	0
41	DF	(England) James Bree	1	0	0	0	0	0	1	0
42	MF	(Tunisia) Idris El Mizouni	1	0	0	0	0	0	1	0
Total			74	5	1	0	2	0	77	5

== Awards ==
=== Player awards ===
Award	Player	Ref
Player of the Year	(England) Luke Chambers	
Young Player of the Year	(England) Jack Lankester	
Goal of the Season	(England) Freddie Sears	

=== EFL Championship Goal of the Month ===
Award	Player	Ref
January	(England) Freddie Sears	
