= George Fowler (footballer) =

English footballer (born 1997)

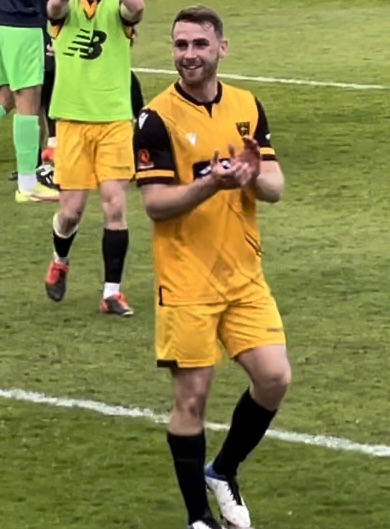

Personal information
- Full name: George Ryan Fowler
- Date of birth: 20 December 1997 (age 28)
- Place of birth: Chelmsford, England
- Height: 1.83 m (6 ft 0 in)
- Position: Defender

Team information
- Current team: Maidstone United
- Number: 5

Youth career
- 2011–2017: Ipswich Town

Senior career*
Years	Team	Apps	(Gls)
2017–2018	Ipswich Town	0	(0)
2017–2018	→ Aldershot Town (loan)	19	(0)
2018–2021	Aldershot Town	76	(2)
2021	→ Maidstone United (loan)	5	(0)
2021–	Maidstone United	20	(1)
- * Club domestic league appearances and goals as of 19:41, 26 November 2021 (UTC)

George Ryan Fowler (born 20 December 1997) is an English professional footballer who plays as a centre-back for National League club Maidstone United.

== Club career ==
Born in Chelmsford, Fowler attended Debenham High School in Suffolk. He captained the school team, playing as a central midfielder in the same side as his twin brother.

Fowler first joined Ipswich Town during the 2011–12 campaign as a schoolboy and signed his first scholarship in July 2014. He played for the under-18 team while he was still an under-15, and earned a one-year professional contract in the summer of 2016. The following year, his contract was extended by a further 12 months.

He went on to make his full senior debut in a 2–1 defeat against Crystal Palace in the EFL Cup second round on 22 August 2017.

On 30 August 2017, along with teammate Adam McDonnell, Fowler joined National League side Aldershot Town on a one-month loan. Three days later, he made his debut during their 1–0 home victory over Solihull Moors, featuring for the entire 90 minutes. Following several extensions to his loan, Fowler agreed to join Aldershot permanently on 31 January 2018.

On 26 October 2021, Fowler joined National League South side, Maidstone United on an initial one-month loan. Following five first-team appearances, Fowler's loan was made permanent a month later for an undisclosed fee, ending his three-year affiliation with the Hampshire-based side.

== Career statistics ==
As of match played 26 October 2021

Appearances and goals by club, season and competition
Club	Season	League			FA Cup		League Cup		Other		Total	
Club	Season	Division	Apps	Goals	Apps	Goals	Apps	Goals	Apps	Goals	Apps	Goals
Ipswich Town	2017–18	Championship	0	0	0	0	1	0	—		1	0
Aldershot Town (loan)	2017–18	National League	19	0	2	0	—		1 (Note: Appearance in the FA Trophy)	0	22	0
Aldershot Town	2017–18	National League	5	0	—		—		0	0	5	0
Aldershot Town	2018–19	National League	19	0	3	1	—		0	0	22	1
Aldershot Town	2019–20	National League	17	2	0	0	—		0	0	17	2
Aldershot Town	2020–21	National League	30	0	1	0	—		1	0	32	0
Aldershot Town	2021–22	National League	5	0	1	1	—		0	0	6	1
Aldershot Town	Total		76	2	5	2	—		1	0	82	4
Maidstone United (loan)	2021–22	National League South	5	0	—		—		0	0	5	0
Maidstone United	2021–22	National League South	20	1	—		—		0	0	0	0
Career total			100	2	7	2	1	0	2	0	109	4
