= Tristan Nydam =

Association football player (born 1999)

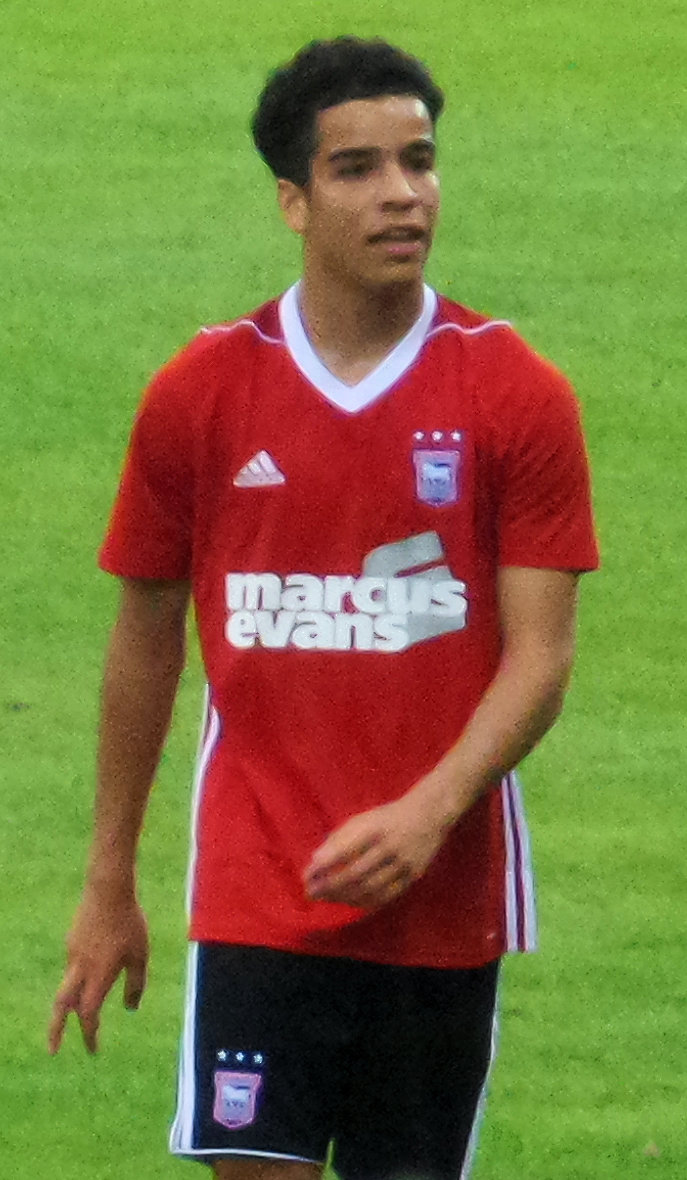
- Nydam playing for Ipswich Town in 2017

Personal information
- Full name: Tristan Ryan Nydam
- Date of birth: 6 November 1999 (age 26)
- Place of birth: Harare, Zimbabwe
- Height: 5 ft 7 in (1.70 m)
- Positions: Midfielder; left back

Youth career
- 2008–2017: Ipswich Town

Senior career*
Years	Team	Apps	(Gls)
2017–2021	Ipswich Town	20	(0)
2018–2019	→ St Johnstone (loan)	5	(0)
Total		25	(0)

International career
2017	England U18	1	(0)
2017	England U19	1	(0)
- * Club domestic league appearances and goals

Tristan Ryan Nydam (born 6 November 1999) is a former professional footballer who played as a midfielder or left back. Nydam represented England at under-18 and under-19 levels.

== Club career ==
=== Ipswich Town ===
Nydam was born in Zimbabwe and moved to England with his family when he was only 10, growing up in Colchester. He became a schoolboy player with Ipswich Town in 2008, before signing a two-year scholarship at Town in July 2016, and then went on to sign his first two-year professional contract in November 2016. He went on to make his full senior debut in the 2–0 win over Luton Town in the first round of the League Cup on 8 August 2017. In November 2017, Nydam signed a new contract with Ipswich until 2021, with the option of an additional year extension. He made 20 appearances during his debut season for the Ipswich first-team.

==== St Johnstone (loan) ====
On 28 August 2018, Nydam signed a loan deal through to January 2019 with Scottish Premiership side St Johnstone. He made his debut for St Johnstone as a sub in a 2–1 away win over Hamilton Academical on 1 September. Nydam found his first team chances limited during his loan spell in Scotland, only making 5 appearances before being recalled in January following the end of his loan deal.

==== Return to Ipswich Town ====
Nydam made 1 substitute appearance for the first-team during the 2018–19 season after returning from loan in January, coming on as a substitute in a 0–2 loss away at Brentford on 10 April 2019.

In July 2019 he broke his ankle during a pre-season Friendly away at Notts County, ruling him out for 6 months.

On 10 April 2021, two years to the day since his last competitive appearance, Nydam made his return from injury as a second-half substitute in a home match against Milton Keynes Dons. On 10 May 2021, Ipswich announced that Nydam would be released following the end of his contract.

== Retirement ==
On 20 March 2022, Nydam announced his retirement from football at the age of 22.

== International career ==
Nydam made his debut for the England under-18 national team in a 2–1 win against Qatar on 24 March 2017.

He was named in the England under-19 squad for friendlies against Poland and Germany in September 2017. He made his debut in the game against Poland, starting the game in a 7–1 win.

== Career statistics ==
As of match played 10 April 2021

Appearances and goals by club, season and competition
Club	Season	Division	League		National Cup		League Cup		Other		Total	
Club	Season	Division	Apps	Goals	Apps	Goals	Apps	Goals	Apps	Goals	Apps	Goals
Ipswich Town	2017–18	Championship	18	0	0	0	2	0	—		20	0
Ipswich Town	2018–19	Championship	1	0	0	0	0	0	—		1	0
Ipswich Town	2019–20	League One	0	0	0	0	0	0	0	0	0	0
Ipswich Town	2020–21	League One	1	0	0	0	0	0	0	0	1	0
Ipswich Town	Total		20	0	0	0	2	0	0	0	22	0
St Johnstone (loan)	2018–19	Scottish Premiership	5	0	0	0	0	0	—		5	0
Career total			25	0	0	0	2	0	0	0	27	0

== Honours ==
Individual

- Ipswich Town Young Player of the Year: 2016–17
