= 2016–17 Ipswich Town F.C. season =

Ipswich Town
2016–17 season
- Owner: Marcus Evans
- Manager: Mick McCarthy
- Stadium: Portman Road
- Championship: 16th
- FA Cup: Third round
- EFL Cup: First round
- Top goalscorer: League: Tom Lawrence (9); All: Tom Lawrence (11)
- Highest home attendance: 25,684 (vs Newcastle United, 17 Apr 2017, EFL Championship)
- Lowest home attendance: 6,858 (vs Stevenage, 9 Aug 2016, EFL Cup)
- Average home league attendance: 16,291
Home colours	Away colours	Third colours

The 2016–17 season was Ipswich Town's 15th consecutive season in the second tier of English football and 139th year in existence. Along with competing in the Championship, the club will also participate in the FA Cup and League Cup.

The season covers the period from 1 July 2016 to 30 June 2017.

== Kits ==
Supplier: Adidas / Sponsor: Marcus Evans Group

Home	Away	Away alt.1	Away alt.2	Third

== First-team squad ==
Note: Flags indicate national team as defined under FIFA eligibility rules; some limited exceptions apply. Players may hold more than one non-FIFA nationality.

No.	Pos.	Nation	Player
1	GK	ENG	Dean Gerken
3	DF	DEN	Jonas Knudsen
4	DF	ENG	Luke Chambers (captain)
5	DF	NZL	Tommy Smith
6	DF	SCO	Christophe Berra
7	MF	ENG	Teddy Bishop
8	MF	ENG	Cole Skuse (vice-captain)
9	FW	IRL	Leon Best
10	FW	IRL	David McGoldrick
11	FW	Jersey	Brett Pitman
12	DF	ENG	Jordan Spence
14	MF	ENG	Paul Digby
15	DF	ENG	Adam Webster
17	MF	MRI	Kévin Bru
18	MF	ENG	Grant Ward

No.	Pos.	Nation	Player
19	MF	ENG	Luke Hyam
20	FW	ENG	Freddie Sears
21	MF	WAL	Jonny Williams (on loan from Crystal Palace)
22	MF	IRL	Jonathan Douglas
23	MF	ENG	Andre Dozzell
27	MF	WAL	Tom Lawrence (on loan from Leicester City)
28	FW	ENG	Kieffer Moore
29	DF	ENG	Josh Emmanuel
30	DF	ENG	Myles Kenlock
33	GK	POL	Bartosz Białkowski
35	MF	ENG	Danny Rowe
39	MF	FRA	Toumani Diagouraga (on loan from Leeds United)
42	FW	ENG	Dominic Samuel (on loan from Reading)
44	MF	WAL	Emyr Huws (on loan from Cardiff City)
47	DF	ENG	Steven Taylor

=== Left club during season ===
Note: Flags indicate national team as defined under FIFA eligibility rules; some limited exceptions apply. Players may hold more than one non-FIFA nationality.

No.	Pos.	Nation	Player
9	FW	IRL	Daryl Murphy (to Newcastle United)
12	FW	ENG	Luke Varney (to Burton Albion)

No.	Pos.	Nation	Player
28	MF	ENG	Conor Grant (loan return to Everton)

== First-team coaching staff ==
Position	Name
Manager	(Republic of Ireland) Mick McCarthy
Assistant Manager	(England) Terry Connor
Goalkeeping Coach	(England) Malcolm Webster
Fitness Coach	(Scotland) Andy Liddell
Head Physiotherapist	(England) Matt Byard
Assistant Head Physiotherapist	(England) Alex Chapman
Kitman	(England) James Pullen

== Pre-season ==
9 July 2015 Friendly	Shelbourne	1–2	Ipswich Town	Dublin, Ireland
15:00 IST	Grimes 77'	Report	Pitman 28'; Sears 63'	Stadium: Tolka Park

13 July 2016 Friendly	Barnet	1–0	Ipswich Town	Edgware, London
15:00 IST	Akinde 69'	Report		Stadium: The Hive Stadium

20 July 2016 Friendly	Colchester United	0–1	Ipswich Town	Colchester, Essex
15:00 IST		Report	Pitman 39'	Stadium: Colchester Community Stadium

23 July 2016 Friendly	Cambridge United	1–1	Ipswich Town	Cambridge, Cambridgeshire
15:00 IST	Pigott 89'	Report	Dozzell 83'	Stadium: Abbey Stadium

26 July 2016 Friendly	Charlton Athletic	0–0	Ipswich Town	Charlton, London, Greater London
15:00 IST		Report		Stadium: The Valley

30 July 2016 Friendly	Ipswich Town	1–2	Royale Union Saint-Gilloise	Ipswich, Suffolk
15:00 IST	Murphy 61'	Report	Fixelles 72'; Rajsel 76'	Stadium: Portman Road

== Competitions ==
=== EFL Championship ===
==== League table ====
Pos	Team	Pld	W	D	L	GF	GA	GD	Pts
14	Barnsley	46	15	13	18	64	67	−3	58
15	Wolverhampton Wanderers	46	16	10	20	54	58	−4	58
16	Ipswich Town	46	13	16	17	48	58	−10	55
17	Bristol City	46	15	9	22	60	66	−6	54
18	Queens Park Rangers	46	15	8	23	52	66	−14	53

Source: English Football League, Soccerway
Rules for classification: 1) Points; 2) Goal difference; 3) Number of goals scored; 4) Points in head-to-head matches; 5) Goal difference in head-to-head matches; 6) Goals scored in head-to-head matches; 7) Play-off.

==== Results summary ====
Overall								Home						Away					
Pld	W	D	L	GF	GA	GD	Pts	W	D	L	GF	GA	GD	W	D	L	GF	GA	GD
46	13	16	17	48	58	−10	55	8	10	5	30	24	+6	5	6	12	18	34	−16

Last updated: 7 May 2017.
Source: Football League Championship

==== Results by matchday ====
Round	1	2	3	4	5	6	7	8	9	10	11	12	13	14	15	16	17	18	19	20	21	22	23	24	25	26	27	28	29	30	31	32	33	34	35	36	37	38	39	40	41	42	43	44	45	46
Ground	H	A	A	H	H	A	A	H	A	H	H	A	H	A	H	A	H	H	A	H	A	A	H	H	A	H	A	A	H	H	A	A	H	A	H	H	A	A	H	H	A	A	H	A	H	A
Result	W	L	D	D	W	L	W	D	L	D	L	D	W	L	D	W	L	W	L	D	L	W	L	W	L	W	L	D	L	D	W	D	D	D	D	D	D	L	D	W	L	W	W	L	L	L
Position	2	13	12	13	11	13	8	11	14	13	16	17	12	17	15	15	17	14	16	17	17	15	16	14	15	14	14	14	17	16	13	13	13	15	15	16	16	17	17	17	17	15	15	16	16	16

A = Away; H = Home; W = Win; D = Draw; L = Loss

==== Matches ====
6 August 2016 1	Ipswich Town	4–2	Barnsley	Ipswich
15:00 BST	Bishop (yellow card) 20'; Bru (yellow card) 37'; Ward 46', 61', 84'; McGoldrick 63' (pen.)	Report	Watkins (yellow card) 27' (goal) 74'; Kent (yellow card) 42'; Hourihane 49' (yellow card) 58'	Stadium: Portman Road; Attendance: 17,370; Referee: Keith Stroud

13 August 2016 2	Brentford	2–0	Ipswich Town	Brentford
15:00 BST	Egan 48', 56'	Report	Webster (yellow card) 38'	Stadium: Griffin Road; Attendance: 10,089; Referee: Steve Martin

16 August 2016 3	Wolverhampton Wanderers	0–0	Ipswich Town	Wolverhampton
19:45 BST	Hause (yellow card) 20'; Saville (yellow card) 75'	Report	Bishop (yellow card) 54'; Knudsen (yellow card) 72'; Chambers (yellow card) 82'; Bru (yellow card) 90+1'; Berra (yellow card) 90+4'	Stadium: Molineux; Attendance: 19,991; Referee: Peter Bankes

21 August 2016 4	Ipswich Town	1–1	Norwich City	Ipswich
12:00 BST	Knudsen 45+1'	Report	Jerome 26'; Tettey (yellow card) 64'	Stadium: Portman Road; Attendance: 23,350; Referee: David Coote

27 August 2016 5	Ipswich Town	1–0	Preston North End	Ipswich
15:00 BST	Ward 15'; Skuse (yellow card) 45'	Report	Spurr (yellow card) 38'	Stadium: Portman Road; Attendance: 15,296; Referee: Tim Robinson

9 September 2016 6	Reading	2–1	Ipswich Town	Reading
20:00 BST	Moore (yellow card) 29'; Gunter (yellow card) 38'; Evans (yellow card) 41'; McCleary 45+2' (pen.); Blackett (yellow card) 49' van den Berg (yellow card) 90+4'; Williams 90+5' (pen.)	Report	Pitman 50' (pen.); Chambers (yellow card) 52'; Berra (yellow card) 90+4'	Stadium: Madejski Stadium; Attendance: 15,146; Referee: Jeremy Simpson

13 September 2016 7	Derby County	0–1	Ipswich Town	Derby
19:45 BST		Report	Skuse (yellow card) 36'; Berra (yellow card) 40'; Varney (yellow card) 48' (goal) 53'; Pitman (yellow card) 90'	Stadium: iPro Stadium; Attendance: 26,425; Referee: Stuart Attwell

17 September 2016 8	Ipswich Town	0–0	Aston Villa	Ipswich
15:00 BST	Lawrence (yellow card) 52'	Report	Kodjia (yellow card) 74'	Stadium: Portman Road; Attendance: 19,249; Referee: Tony Harrington

24 September 2016 9	Leeds United	1–0	Ipswich Town	Leeds
15:00 BST	Wood 35'	Report	Bru (yellow card) 76'; Berra (yellow card) 81'	Stadium: Elland Road; Attendance: 22,554; Referee: Steve Martin

27 September 2016 10	Ipswich Town	0–0	Brighton & Hove Albion	Ipswich
19:45 BST	Lawrence (yellow card) 24'; Chambers (yellow card) 59'; Douglas (yellow card) 61'; Emmanuel (yellow card) 84'	Report	Norwood (yellow card) 37'; Stephens (yellow card) 42' (yellow-red card) 82'; Murray (yellow card) 90+4'	Stadium: Portman Road Stadium; Attendance: 15,228; Referee: Andrew Davies

1 October 2016 11	Ipswich Town	0–1	Huddersfield Town	Ipswich
15:00 BST	Douglas (yellow card) 52'	Report	Hogg (yellow card) 50'; Schindler 58'	Stadium: Portman Road; Attendance: 16,146; Referee: Chris Kavanagh

15 October 2016 12	Blackburn Rovers	0–0	Ipswich Town	Blackburn
15:00 BST	Gallagher (yellow card) 87'	Report		Stadium: Ewood Park; Attendance: 10,820; Referee: Geoff Eltringham

18 October 2016 13	Ipswich Town	2–0	Burton Albion	Ipswich
19:45 BST	Chambers 15'; Skuse (yellow card) 35'; Sears 88'	Report	Irvine (yellow card) 21'; Mousinho (yellow card) 80'	Stadium: Portman Road; Attendance: 15,816; Referee: Oliver Langford

22 October 2016 14	Newcastle United	3–0	Ipswich Town	Newcastle upon Tyne
15:00 BST	Pérez 1', 73'; Colback (yellow card) 27'; Ritchie 78'; Dummett (yellow card) 86'	Report	Knudsen (yellow card) 41'	Stadium: St. James' Park; Attendance: 51,963; Referee: James Adcock

29 October 2016 15	Ipswich Town	2–2	Rotherham United	Ipswich
15:00 BST	Sears 3'; McGoldrick 90+5'	Report	Ward 7', 48'	Stadium: Portman Road; Attendance: 15,247; Referee: Darren Bond

5 November 2016 16	Sheffield Wednesday	1–2	Ipswich Town	Sheffield
15:00 GMT	Hooper 36'; Fletcher (yellow card) 59'	Report	Lawrence 32'; Chambers (yellow card) 56' (goal) 87'; Ward (yellow card) 88'	Stadium: Hillsborough Stadium; Attendance: 25,851; Referee: Andrew Madley

19 November 2016 17	Ipswich Town	0–2	Nottingham Forest	Ipswich
17:30 GMT	McGoldrick (yellow card) 44'	Report	Assombalonga 1', 45+1'; Vellios (yellow card) 57'; Lansbury (yellow card) 69'	Stadium: Portman Road; Attendance: 15,417; Referee: Peter Bankes

26 November 2016 18	Ipswich Town	3–0	Queens Park Rangers	Ipswich
15:00 GMT	Ward 13'; Varney 54'; Lawrence 61' (yellow card) 71'	Report	Perch (yellow card) 25'; Chery (yellow card) 71'	Stadium: Portman Road Stadium; Attendance: 16,510; Referee: Andy Woolmer

3 December 2016 19	Bristol City	2–0	Ipswich Town	Bristol
15:00 GMT	Wilbraham (yellow card) 7'; Tomlin 31' (pen.) (yellow card) 38'; Freeman 72'	Report		Stadium: Ashton Gate Stadium; Attendance: 18,309; Referee: Stuart Attwell

10 December 2016 20	Ipswich Town	1–1	Cardiff City	Ipswich
15:00 GMT	Lawrence (yellow card) 37'; Varney 52'; Chambers (yellow card) 90+1'	Report	Connolly (yellow card) 27'; Gunnarsson 38' (yellow card) 87'; Bamba (red card) 70'; Pilkington (yellow card) 90'; Hoilett (yellow card) 90+3'	Stadium: Portman Road; Attendance: 15,042; Referee: James Adcock

13 December 2016 21	Birmingham City	2–1	Ipswich Town	Birmingham
19:45 GMT	Cotterill (yellow card) 38'; Donaldson 41' (pen.); Shotton (yellow card) 43'; Morrison 53'; Kieftenbeld (yellow card) 90+1'	Report	Chambers (yellow card) 39'; Webster 69'; Berra (yellow card) 90+5'	Stadium: St Andrew's; Attendance: 15,212; Referee: Darren Bond

17 December 2016 22	Wigan Athletic	2–3	Ipswich Town	Wigan
15:00 GMT	Wildschut 35', 62'; Kellett (yellow card) 44'; Burn (yellow card) 45+1'; Jääskeläinen (yellow card) 45+3'	Report	Pitman 7' (pen.), 68', (yellow card) 13'; Dozzell (yellow card) 15'; McGoldrick 88'; Lawrence (yellow card) 90+3'	Stadium: The DW Stadium; Attendance: 10,071; Referee: Keith Stroud

26 December 2016 23	Ipswich Town	0–2	Fulham	Ipswich
15:00 GMT	Lawrence (yellow card) 69'; McGoldrick (yellow card) 76'	Report	Martin 36'; McDonald (yellow card) 64'; Sigurðsson 78'	Stadium: Portman Road; Attendance: 19,723; Referee: Oliver Langford

30 December 2016 24	Ipswich Town	2–1	Bristol City	Ipswich
19:45 GMT	Bru 39'; Pitman (yellow card) 43' (goal) 87'	Report	Abraham 52'; Magnússon (yellow card) 55'; Brownhill (yellow card) 58'	Stadium: Portman Road Stadium; Attendance: 15,640; Referee: David Coote

2 January 2017 25	Queens Park Rangers	2–1	Ipswich Town	Shepherd's Bush, London
15:00 GMT	Sylla 30'; Wszołek 83'	Report	Lawrence 48'	Stadium: Loftus Road Stadium; Attendance: 15,136; Referee: Tony Harrington

14 January 2017 26	Ipswich Town	3–2	Blackburn Rovers	Ipswich
15:00 GMT	Lawrence 38', 57', (yellow card) 42'; Berra 53'; Dozzell (yellow card) 65'	Report	Akpan 43'; Graham 74' (pen.)	Stadium: Portman Road Stadium; Attendance: 15,009; Referee: James Linington

21 January 2017 27	Huddersfield Town	2–0	Ipswich Town	Huddersfield
15:00 GMT	Brown 41'; Schindler 57'	Report	Bru (yellow card) 56'; Douglas (yellow card) 71'; Digby (yellow card) 76'; Berra (yellow card) 83'; Lawrence (yellow card) 85'	Stadium: The John Smith's Stadium; Attendance: 19,113; Referee: Andy Davies

28 January 2017 28	Preston North End	1–1	Ipswich Town	Preston
15:00 GMT	Vermijl (yellow card) 14'; Hugill 89'; McGeady (yellow card) 90+2'	Report	Lawrence 16'	Stadium: Deepdale Stadium; Attendance: 10,656; Referee: Steve Martin

31 January 2017 29	Ipswich Town	0–3	Derby County	Ipswich
19:45 GMT		Report	Bryson 9'; Ince 12'; Bent 45+4'	Stadium: Portman Road; Attendance: 14,719; Referee: Andrew Madley

4 February 2017 30	Ipswich Town	2–2	Reading	Ipswich
15:00 GMT	Lawrence 43', 61'; Knudsen (yellow card) 90+4'	Report	Mutch 52'; Obita 78'; Grabban (yellow card) 85'; Evans (yellow card) 89'	Stadium: Portman Road; Attendance: 15,091; Referee: Geoff Eltringham

11 February 2017 31	Aston Villa	0–1	Ipswich Town	Birmingham
15:00 GMT		Report	Knudsen (yellow card) 76'; Diagouraga (yellow card) 79'; Huws 83'	Stadium: Villa Park; Attendance: 30,796; Referee: Tim Robinson

14 February 2017 32	Brighton & Hove Albion	1–1	Ipswich Town	Brighton
19:45 GMT	Hemed 29' (pen.); Baldock (yellow card) 31'; Dunk (yellow card) 56'	Report	Kenlock (yellow card) 2'; Chambers 9'; Emmanuel (yellow card) 21'; Lawrence (yellow card) 29'; McGoldrick (yellow card) 35'; Huws (yellow card) 90+5'	Stadium: Amex Stadium; Attendance: 26,360; Referee: Roger East

18 February 2017 33	Ipswich Town	1–1	Leeds United	Ipswich
15:00 GMT	Sears 9'; Knudsen (yellow card) 85'	Report	Dallas 42'	Stadium: Portman Road; Attendance: 18,748; Referee: Keith Stroud

26 February 2017 34	Norwich City	1–1	Ipswich Town	Norwich
12:00 GMT	Murphy 69'	Report	Sears (yellow card) 59'; Knudsen 63'; Spence (yellow card) 87'	Stadium: Carrow Road; Attendance: 27,107; Referee: Oliver Langford

4 March 2017 35	Ipswich Town	1–1	Brentford	Ipswich
15:00 GMT	Huws 26'	Report	Yennaris 44'	Stadium: Portman Road; Attendance: 15,863; Referee: Scott Duncan

7 March 2017 36	Ipswich Town	0–0	Wolverhampton Wanderers	Ipswich
19:45 GMT	Knudsen (yellow card) 21'	Report	Batth (yellow card) 47'	Stadium: Portman Road; Attendance: 15,076; Referee: Darren Deadman

11 March 2017 37	Barnsley	1–1	Ipswich Town	Barnsley
15:00 GMT	Watkins 58'	Report	Skuse (yellow card) 45'; Lawrence 90+2' (yellow card) 90+2'	Stadium: Oakwell; Attendance: 11,836; Referee: Stephen Martin

18 March 2017 38	Cardiff City	3–1	Ipswich Town	Cardiff
15:00 GMT	Zohore 36', 50'; Bennett 63'	Report	Chambers 23'; Berra (yellow card) 53'; Pitman (yellow card) 68'	Stadium: Cardiff City Stadium; Attendance: 15,182; Referee: James Linington

1 April 2017 39	Ipswich Town	1–1	Birmingham City	Ipswich
15:00 BST	Ward 72'	Report	Grounds 48'; Bielik (yellow card) 69'	Stadium: Portman Road; Attendance: 16,667; Referee: Andrew Madley

4 April 2017 40	Ipswich Town	3–0	Wigan Athletic	Ipswich
19:45 BST	McGoldrick 22'; Sears 30', 85'; Kenlock (yellow card) 55'; Diagouraga (yellow card) 60'; Ward (yellow card) 68'	Report	Burn (yellow card) 59'; Power (yellow card) 81'	Stadium: Portman Road; Attendance: 14,661; Referee: Andy Davies

8 April 2017 41	Fulham	3–1	Ipswich Town	Fulham
15:00 BST	Ayité 17'; Malone 30' (yellow card) 90'; McDonald (yellow card) 37'; Johansen 61'; Ream (yellow card) 74'	Report	Chambers (yellow card) 52'; Berra 90+1'	Stadium: Craven Cottage; Attendance: 20,959; Referee: Geoff Eltringham

14 April 2017 42	Burton Albion	1–2	Ipswich Town	Burton upon Trent
19:45 BST	Akins 86' (pen.)	Report	Varney 52' (o.g.); Sears 79' (yellow card) 90+4'	Stadium: Pirelli Stadium; Attendance: 5,236; Referee: Oliver Langford

17 April 2017 43	Ipswich Town	3–1	Newcastle United	Ipswich
15:00 BST	Sears 42'; McGoldrick (yellow card) 60' (goal) 69'; Lawrence (yellow card) 65'; Huws 90+3'	Report	Hayden (yellow card) 50'; Yedlin (yellow card) 51'; Murphy 62'	Stadium: Portman Road; Attendance: 25,684; Referee: Tim Robinson

22 April 2017 44	Rotherham United	1–0	Ipswich Town	Rotherham
15:00 BST	Bray (yellow card) 64'; Mattock (yellow card) 74'; Adeyemi 79'	Report	Diagouraga (yellow card) 54'	Stadium: New York Stadium; Attendance: 8,266; Referee: Jeremy Simpson

29 April 2017 45	Ipswich Town	0–1	Sheffield Wednesday	Ipswich
15:00 BST	Skuse (yellow card) 39'	Report	Lee 77'	Stadium: Portman Road; Attendance: 19,000; Referee: James Adcock

7 May 2017 46	Nottingham Forest	3–0	Ipswich Town	Nottingham
12:00 BST	Assombalonga 43' (pen.), 69'; Cohen 57'	Report	Emmanuel (yellow card) 66'; Berra (yellow card) 84'	Stadium: City Ground; Attendance: 28,249; Referee: Andy Davies

=== FA Cup ===
7 January 2017 Third round	Ipswich Town	2–2	Lincoln City	Ipswich
15:00 GMT	Lawrence 12', 86'	Report	Robinson 7', 65' (yellow card) 65'; Habergham (yellow card) 90+3'	Stadium: Portman Road Stadium; Attendance: 16,027; Referee: Lee Probert

17 January 2017 Third round replay	Lincoln City	1–0	Ipswich Town	Lincoln
20:05 GMT	Rhead (yellow card) 49'; Arnold 90'	Report	Douglas (yellow card) 64'	Stadium: Sincil Bank; Attendance: 9,069; Referee: Ben Toner

=== EFL Cup ===
9 August 2016 First round	Ipswich Town	0–1	Stevenage	Ipswich
19:45 BST	Smith (yellow card) 51'	Report	Kennedy 53'; Lee (yellow card) 77'; Henry (yellow card) 81'	Stadium: Portman Road; Attendance: 6,858; Referee: Charles Breakspear

== Transfers ==
=== Transfers in ===
Date from	Position	Nationality	Name	From	Fee	Ref.
1 July 2016	DM	(England)	Paul Digby	(England) Barnsley	Free transfer	
1 July 2016	LB	(England)	Patrick Webber	(England) Worthing	Free transfer	
1 July 2016	CB	(England)	Adam Webster	(England) Portsmouth	Undisclosed + player swap (Note: Fee reported as £750,000 + player swap with Matthew Clarke moving to Portsmouth)	
1 August 2016	RM	(England)	Grant Ward	(England) Tottenham Hotspur	Undisclosed (Note: Fee reported as £600,000)	
30 August 2016	CF	(Republic of Ireland)	Leon Best	(England) Rotherham United	Free transfer	
16 January 2017	CF	(England)	Kieffer Moore	(England) Forest Green Rovers	Undisclosed (Note: Fee reported as £10,000)	
16 January 2017	RB	(England)	Jordan Spence	Free agent	Free transfer	
26 January 2017	CB	(England)	Steven Taylor	(United States) Portland Timbers	Free transfer	
27 January 2017	LM	(England)	Danny Rowe	(England) Macclesfield Town	Undisclosed	

=== Loans in ===
Date from	Position	Nationality	Name	From	Date until	Ref.
4 August 2016	CM	(England)	Conor Grant	(England) Everton	18 November 2016 (Note: Conor Grant returned to Everton on 18 November 2016, cutting his loan deal short.)	
30 August 2016	SS	(Wales)	Tom Lawrence	(England) Leicester City	End of Season	
31 August 2016	AM	(Wales)	Jonny Williams	(England) Crystal Palace	End of Season	
23 January 2017	DM	(France)	Toumani Diagouraga	(England) Leeds United	End of Season	
31 January 2017	DM	(Wales)	Emyr Huws	(Wales) Cardiff City	End of Season	
31 January 2017	CF	(England)	Dominic Samuel	(England) Reading	End of Season	

=== Transfers out ===
Date from	Position	Nationality	Name	To	Fee	Ref.
1 July 2016	CB	(England)	Matthew Clarke	(England) Portsmouth	Player swap (Note: Matthew Clarke's move to Portsmouth was part of the deal for Adam Webster)	
1 July 2016	RB	(England)	Kyle Hammond	Free agent	Released	
1 July 2016	GK	(Scotland)	Jonathan Henly	(England) Hemel Hempstead Town	Free transfer	
1 July 2016	CF	(Republic of Ireland)	Cemal Ramadan	(England) Royston Town	Free transfer	
1 July 2016	LM	(Republic of Ireland)	Jay Tabb	Retired		
1 July 2016	RW	(Guinea)	Larsen Touré	Free agent	Released	
1 July 2016	CB	(Wales)	Josh Yorwerth	(England) Crawley Town	Free transfer	
9 July 2016	CF	(England)	Charlie Brown	(England) Chelsea	Compensation	
5 August 2016	RB	(Republic of Ireland)	Kevin Foley	(England) Charlton Athletic	Free transfer	
11 August 2016	CM	(Denmark)	Victor Guldbrandsen	(Denmark) HB Køge	Free transfer	
28 August 2016	CF	(Republic of Ireland)	Daryl Murphy	(England) Newcastle United	£3,000,000	
31 August 2016	CB	(Poland)	Piotr Malarczyk	(Poland) Cracovia	Free transfer	
4 January 2017	LW	(England)	Luke Varney	(England) Burton Albion	Free transfer	

=== Loans out ===
Date from	Position	Nationality	Name	To	Date until	Ref.
25 August 2016	CB	(England)	Joe Robinson	(England) Boston United	1 January 2017	
23 September 2016	GK	(England)	Jacob Marsden	(England) Leiston	30 June 2017	
26 October 2016	SS	(New Zealand)	Monty Patterson	(England) Braintree Town	1 January 2017	
7 December 2016	CM	(England)	Kundai Benyu	(England) Aldershot Town	3 March 2017	
3 March 2017	CB	(England)	Joe Robinson	(England) St Albans City	31 May 2017	
11 March 2017	CF	(England)	Ben Morris	(England) Woking	1 June 2017	
23 March 2017	AM	(Republic of Ireland)	Shane McLoughlin	(England) Bromley	30 June 2017	

== Squad statistics ==
All statistics updated as of end of season

=== Appearances and goals ===
No.	Pos	Nat	Player	Total		Championship		FA Cup		League Cup	
No.	Pos	Nat	Player	Apps	Goals	Apps	Goals	Apps	Goals	Apps	Goals
Goalkeepers
1	GK	(England) ENG	Dean Gerken	5	0	2	0	2	0	1	0
33	GK	(Poland) POL	Bartosz Białkowski	44	0	44	0	0	0	0	0
Defenders
3	DF	(Denmark) DEN	Jonas Knudsen	39	2	35+1	2	2	0	1	0
4	DF	(England) ENG	Luke Chambers	48	4	46	4	1	0	1	0
5	DF	(New Zealand) NZL	Tommy Smith	11	0	6+4	0	0	0	1	0
6	DF	(Scotland) SCO	Christophe Berra	46	2	44	2	2	0	0	0
12	DF	(England) ENG	Jordan Spence	17	0	15+2	0	0	0	0	0
15	DF	(England) ENG	Adam Webster	24	1	21+2	1	1	0	0	0
29	DF	(England) ENG	Josh Emmanuel	17	0	11+4	0	2	0	0	0
30	DF	(England) ENG	Myles Kenlock	18	0	16+2	0	0	0	0	0
47	DF	(England) ENG	Steven Taylor	3	0	3	0	0	0	0	0
Midfielders
7	MF	(England) ENG	Teddy Bishop	20	0	7+12	0	0	0	0+1	0
8	MF	(England) ENG	Cole Skuse	41	0	40	0	1	0	0	0
14	MF	(England) ENG	Paul Digby	6	0	2+2	0	1	0	1	0
17	MF	(Mauritius) MRI	Kévin Bru	28	1	14+12	1	1	0	1	0
18	MF	(England) ENG	Grant Ward	46	6	34+9	6	2	0	1	0
19	MF	(England) ENG	Luke Hyam	0	0	0	0	0	0	0	0
21	MF	(Wales) WAL	Jonny Williams	8	0	1+7	0	0	0	0	0
22	MF	(Republic of Ireland) IRL	Jonathan Douglas	23	0	17+4	0	1	0	1	0
23	MF	(England) ENG	Andre Dozzell	9	0	6	0	1+1	0	1	0
27	MF	(Wales) WAL	Tom Lawrence	36	11	32+2	9	0	0	2	2
35	MF	(England) ENG	Danny Rowe	4	0	2+2	0	0	0	0	0
37	MF	(France) FRA	Toumani Diagouraga	12	0	10+2	0	0	0	0	0
44	MF	(Wales) WAL	Emyr Huws	13	3	13	3	0	0	0	0
Forwards
9	FW	(Republic of Ireland) IRL	Leon Best	12	0	5+6	0	1	0	0	0
10	FW	(Republic of Ireland) IRL	David McGoldrick	31	5	25+5	5	0	0	0+1	0
11	FW	Jersey	Brett Pitman	23	4	13+9	4	1	0	0	0
20	FW	(England) ENG	Freddie Sears	43	7	30+10	7	1+1	0	1	0
28	FW	(England) ENG	Kieffer Moore	11	0	0+11	0	0	0	0	0
42	FW	(England) ENG	Dominic Samuel	6	0	2+4	0	0	0	0	0
Players transferred out during the season
9	FW	(Republic of Ireland) IRL	Daryl Murphy	4	0	4	0	0	0	0	0
12	FW	(England) ENG	Luke Varney	15	3	4+11	3	0	0	0	0
28	MF	(England) ENG	Conor Grant	7	0	3+3	0	0	0	1	0

Last updated: end of season
Source: Competitions

=== Goalscorers ===
No.	Pos	Nat	Player	Championship	FA Cup	EFL Cup	Total
27	MF	(Wales)	Tom Lawrence	9	2	0	11
20	FW	(England)	Freddie Sears	7	0	0	7
18	MF	(England)	Grant Ward	6	0	0	6
10	FW	(Republic of Ireland)	David McGoldrick	5	0	0	5
4	DF	(England)	Luke Chambers	4	0	0	4
11	FW	(England)	Brett Pitman	4	0	0	4
12	FW	(England)	Luke Varney	3	0	0	3
44	MF	(Wales)	Emyr Huws	3	0	0	3
3	DF	(Denmark)	Jonas Knudsen	2	0	0	2
6	DF	(Scotland)	Christophe Berra	2	0	0	2
15	DF	(England)	Adam Webster	1	0	0	1
17	MF	(Mauritius)	Kévin Bru	1	0	0	1
Own goal				1	0	0	1
Total				48	2	0	50

=== Assists ===
No.	Pos	Nat	Player	Championship	FA Cup	EFL Cup	Total
27	MF	(Wales)	Tom Lawrence	9	0	0	9
8	MF	(England)	Cole Skuse	4	0	0	4
18	MF	(England)	Grant Ward	3	1	0	4
20	FW	(England)	Freddie Sears	4	0	0	4
10	FW	(Republic of Ireland)	David McGoldrick	3	0	0	3
11	FW	(England)	Brett Pitman	3	0	0	3
6	DF	(Scotland)	Christophe Berra	1	0	0	1
9	FW	(Republic of Ireland)	Daryl Murphy	1	0	0	1
12	DF	(England)	Jordan Spence	1	0	0	1
15	DF	(England)	Adam Webster	1	0	0	1
17	MF	(Mauritius)	Kévin Bru	1	0	0	1
30	DF	(England)	Myles Kenlock	1	0	0	1
42	FW	(England)	Dominic Samuel	1	0	0	1
44	MF	(Wales)	Emyr Huws	1	0	0	1
Total				32	1	0	33

=== Clean sheets ===
No.	Nat	Name	Championship	EFL Cup	FA Cup	Total
33	(Poland)	Bartosz Białkowski	9	0	0	9
Total			9	0	0	9

=== Disciplinary record ===
No.	Pos.	Name	Championship		FA Cup		EFL Cup		Total	
No.	Pos.	Name	Booked	Sent off (straight red)	Booked	Sent off (straight red)	Booked	Sent off (straight red)	Booked	Sent off (straight red)
3	DF	(Denmark) Jonas Knudsen	7	0	0	0	0	0	7	0
4	DF	(England) Luke Chambers	7	0	0	0	0	0	7	0
5	DF	(New Zealand) Tommy Smith	6	0	1	0	0	0	7	0
6	DF	(Scotland) Christophe Berra	8	0	0	0	0	0	8	0
7	MF	(England) Teddy Bishop	2	0	0	0	0	0	2	0
8	MF	(England) Cole Skuse	6	0	0	0	0	0	6	0
10	FW	(Republic of Ireland) David McGoldrick	4	0	0	0	0	0	4	0
11	FW	(England) Brett Pitman	4	0	0	0	0	0	4	0
12	FW	(England) Luke Varney	1	0	0	0	0	0	1	0
12	DF	(England) Jordan Spence	1	0	0	0	0	0	1	0
14	DF	(England) Paul Digby	1	0	0	0	0	0	1	0
15	DF	(England) Adam Webster	1	0	0	0	0	0	1	0
17	MF	(Mauritius) Kévin Bru	4	0	0	0	0	0	4	0
18	MF	(England) Grant Ward	2	0	0	0	0	0	2	0
20	FW	(England) Freddie Sears	1	0	0	0	0	0	1	0
22	MF	(Republic of Ireland) Jonathan Douglas	3	0	1	0	0	0	4	0
23	MF	(England) Andre Dozzell	2	0	0	0	0	0	2	0
27	MF	(Wales) Tom Lawrence	11	0	0	0	0	0	11	0
29	DF	(England) Josh Emmanuel	3	0	0	0	0	0	3	0
30	DF	(England) Myles Kenlock	2	0	0	0	0	0	2	0
37	MF	(France) Toumani Diagouraga	3	0	0	0	0	0	3	0
44	MF	(Wales) Emyr Huws	1	0	0	0	0	0	1	0
Total			80	0	1	0	1	0	82	0

== Awards ==
=== Player awards ===
Award	Player	Ref
Player of the Year	(Poland) Bartosz Białkowski	
Players' Player of the Year	(Wales) Tom Lawrence	
Young Player of the Year	(England) Tristan Nydam	
Goal of the Season	(Wales) Tom Lawrence	
