= 2015–16 Ipswich Town F.C. season =

Ipswich Town
2015–16 season
- Owner: Marcus Evans
- Manager: Mick McCarthy
- Stadium: Portman Road
- Championship: 7th
- FA Cup: Third round
- League Cup: Third round
- Top goalscorer: League: Daryl Murphy / Brett Pitman (10); All: Brett Pitman (11)
- Highest home attendance: 23,615 (vs QPR, 26 December 2015, Championship)
- Lowest home attendance: 16,488 (vs Blackburn Rovers, 15 March 2016, Championship)
- Average home league attendance: 18,989
Home colours	Away colours	Third colours

The 2015–16 season was Ipswich Town's 14th consecutive season in the second tier of English football and 138th year in existence. Along with competing in the Championship, the club also participated in the FA Cup and League Cup. The season covered the period from 1 July 2015 to 30 June 2016.

This was to be Mick McCarthy's third full season as manager, having taken charge in November 2012. In January both McCarthy and his assistant Terry Connor extended their contracts with the club until the summer of 2018.

== Kits ==
Supplier: Adidas / Sponsor: Marcus Evans Group

Home	Away	Away alt.1	Third

== First-team squad ==
Note: Flags indicate national team as defined under FIFA eligibility rules; some limited exceptions apply. Players may hold more than one non-FIFA nationality.

No.	Pos.	Nation	Player
1	GK	ENG	Dean Gerken
3	DF	DEN	Jonas Knudsen
4	DF	ENG	Luke Chambers (captain)
5	DF	NZL	Tommy Smith
6	DF	SCO	Christophe Berra
7	MF	ENG	Ainsley Maitland-Niles (on loan from Arsenal)
8	MF	ENG	Cole Skuse (vice-captain)
9	FW	IRL	Daryl Murphy
10	FW	IRL	David McGoldrick
11	FW	Jersey	Brett Pitman
12	MF	ENG	Liam Feeney (on loan from Bolton Wanderers)
14	MF	SCO	Ryan Fraser (on loan from Bournemouth)
15	MF	ENG	Ben Pringle (on loan from Fulham)
16	MF	ENG	Giles Coke
17	MF	MRI	Kévin Bru

No.	Pos.	Nation	Player
18	MF	IRL	Jay Tabb
19	MF	ENG	Luke Hyam
20	FW	ENG	Freddie Sears
22	MF	IRL	Jonathan Douglas
25	DF	WAL	Josh Yorwerth
26	MF	IRL	Adam McDonnell
27	MF	ENG	Teddy Bishop
29	DF	ENG	Josh Emmanuel
30	DF	ENG	Myles Kenlock
33	GK	POL	Bartosz Białkowski
37	MF	ENG	Paul Digby (on loan from Barnsley)
39	MF	GUI	Larsen Touré
41	MF	ENG	Andre Dozzell
42	FW	ENG	Luke Varney
44	DF	IRL	Kevin Foley

=== Left club during season ===
Note: Flags indicate national team as defined under FIFA eligibility rules; some limited exceptions apply. Players may hold more than one non-FIFA nationality.

No.	Pos.	Nation	Player
2	DF	NOR	Jonathan Parr (to Strømsgodset)
12	FW	ENG	James Alabi (released)
15	MF	AUS	Tommy Oar (to Brisbane Roar)

No.	Pos.	Nation	Player
21	DF	POL	Piotr Malarczyk (on loan to Southend United)
34	DF	ENG	Joe Robinson (on loan to Woking)

== First-team coaching staff ==
Position	Name
Manager	(Republic of Ireland) Mick McCarthy
Assistant Manager	(England) Terry Connor
Goalkeeping Coach	(England) Malcolm Webster
Fitness Coach	(Scotland) Andy Liddell
Head Physiotherapist	(England) Matt Byard
Assistant Head Physiotherapist	(England) Alex Chapman
Kitman	(England) James Pullen

== Pre-season ==
On 27 May 2015, Ipswich Town announced they will travel to Ireland to face Shelbourne on 11 July 2015. A second friendly was announced a day later when the club confirmed they will travel to face Cambridge United. Also confirmed on 28 May 2015 was friendlies against Fortuna Düsseldorf and Colchester United. On 29 May 2015, Ipswich Town announced a friendly against Peterborough United. On 9 July 2015, Ipswich announced a home friendly against Dutch side Utrecht. On 23 July 2015, Ipswich announced a XI side will travel to face Bishop's Stortford; the match was subsequently postponed following torrential rain.

11 July 2015 Friendly	Shelbourne	0–6	Ipswich Town	Dublin, Ireland
15:00 IST		Report	Henshall 2'; Ambrose 23'; Skuse 38'; Pitman 57' (pen.), 90'; Tabb 82'	Stadium: Tolka Park

17 July 2015 Friendly	Fortuna Düsseldorf	4–3	Ipswich Town	Düsseldorf, Germany
18:30 CEST	Liendl 33' (pen.); Pohjanpalo 45'; Strohdiek 74'; Sararer 83'	Report	Sears 35'; Pitman 62'; Maitland-Niles 72'	Stadium: Paul-Janes-Stadion; Attendance: 5,700

21 July 2015 Friendly	Cambridge United	2–3	Ipswich Town	Cambridge
19:45 BST	Corr 39'; Berry 54'	Report	Maitland-Niles 3'; Pitman 29'; McGoldrick 61'	Stadium: Abbey Stadium; Attendance: 3,608

25 July 2015 Friendly	Peterborough United	0–0	Ipswich Town	Peterborough
15:00 BST		Report		Stadium: London Road

28 July 2015 Friendly	Colchester United	3–2	Ipswich Town	Colchester
19:45 BST	Gilbey (?); Massey (?)	Report	Bru 45'; McGoldrick (?)	Stadium: Colchester Community Stadium; Attendance: 4,647

1 August 2015 Friendly	Ipswich Town	1–1	Utrecht	Ipswich
15:00 BST	McGoldrick 90+' (pen.)	Report	Ramselaar 15'	Stadium: Portman Road

== Competitions ==
=== Football League Championship ===
==== League table ====
Pos	Team	Pld	W	D	L	GF	GA	GD	Pts	Promotion, qualification or relegation
5	Derby County	46	21	15	10	66	43	+23	78	Qualification for the Championship play-offs (Note: Four teams play for one spot and promotion to the Premier League.)
6	Sheffield Wednesday	46	19	17	10	66	45	+21	74	Qualification for the Championship play-offs
7	Ipswich Town	46	18	15	13	53	51	+2	69	
8	Cardiff City	46	17	17	12	56	51	+5	68	
9	Brentford	46	19	8	19	72	67	+5	65	

Source: BBC Sport
Rules for classification: 1) Points; 2) Goal difference; 3) Number of goals scored

==== Results summary ====
Overall								Home						Away					
Pld	W	D	L	GF	GA	GD	Pts	W	D	L	GF	GA	GD	W	D	L	GF	GA	GD
46	18	15	13	53	51	+2	69	9	8	6	28	24	+4	9	7	7	25	27	−2

Last updated: 20 April 2016.
Source: Table

==== Results by round ====
Round	1	2	3	4	5	6	7	8	9	10	11	12	13	14	15	16	17	18	19	20	21	22	23	24	25	26	27	28	29	30	31	32	33	34	35	36	37	38	39	40	41	42	43	44	45	46
Ground	A	H	H	A	H	A	A	H	H	A	H	A	A	H	H	A	H	A	H	A	A	H	H	A	A	H	H	A	H	A	A	H	A	H	A	A	H	H	A	H	H	A	H	A	H	A
Result	D	W	W	W	L	L	W	D	D	L	D	L	D	D	W	W	D	W	L	W	W	L	W	W	D	W	D	L	W	L	L	L	W	W	D	L	W	L	D	D	L	D	D	D	W	W
Position	9	6	1	1	3	8	5	4	7	11	10	12	13	14	10	10	10	7	8	6	6	6	6	6	6	5	7	9	6	7	8	10	9	8	8	8	8	8	8	8	8	8	8	8	8	7

Updated to match(es) played on 20 April 2016. Source: Fixtures Table
A = Away; H = Home; W = Win; D = Draw; L = Loss

==== Matches ====
On 17 June 2015, the fixtures for the forthcoming season were announced.

8 August 2015 1	Brentford	2–2	Ipswich Town	Brentford
15:00 BST	Gray 90'; Tarkowski 90'	Report	Bru 45'; Fraser 50'	Stadium: Griffin Park; Attendance: 10,789; Referee: David Coote

15 August 2015 2	Ipswich Town	2–1	Sheffield Wednesday	Ipswich
15:00 BST	Sears 21'; Smith 53'	Report	Wallace 19'	Stadium: Portman Road; Attendance: 20,081; Referee: James Linington

18 August 2015 3	Ipswich Town	2–0	Burnley	Ipswich
19:45 BST	Sears 66'; McGoldrick 71'	Report		Stadium: Portman Road; Attendance: 18,353; Referee: Simon Hooper

22 August 2015 4	Preston North End	1–2	Ipswich Town	Preston
15:00 BST	Johnson 35'	Report	Pitman 24'; Fraser 67'	Stadium: Deepdale; Attendance: 12,330; Referee: Mark Brown

29 August 2015 5	Ipswich Town	2–3	Brighton & Hove Albion	Ipswich
15:00 BST	Sears 54'; McGoldrick 65' (pen.)	Report	Lua Lua 10'; Hemed 12', 67'	Stadium: Portman Road; Attendance: 21,034; Referee: Keith Hill

11 September 2015 6	Reading	5–1	Ipswich Town	Reading
20:00 BST	Sá 7', 14', 63'; Blackman 49'; Norwood 87'	Report	Sears 11'	Stadium: Madejski Stadium; Attendance: 16,809; Referee: Roger East

15 September 2015 7	Leeds United	0–1	Ipswich Town	Leeds
19:45 BST		Report	Smith 32'	Stadium: Elland Road; Attendance: 21,312; Referee: James Adcock

18 September 2015 8	Ipswich Town	1–1	Birmingham City	Ipswich
19:45 BST	Pitman 32' (pen.)	Report	Cotterill 22'	Stadium: Portman Road; Attendance: 18,973; Referee: Keith Stroud

26 September 2015 9	Ipswich Town	2–2	Bristol City	Ipswich
15:00 BST	Chambers 46'; Fraser 86'	Report	Freeman 53'; Kodjia 56'	Stadium: Portman Road; Attendance: 20,347; Referee: Peter Bankes

3 October 2015 10	Blackburn Rovers	2–0	Ipswich Town	Blackburn
15:00 BST	Rhodes 12', 16'	Report		Stadium: Ewood Park; Attendance: 12,672; Referee: Andre Marriner

17 October 2015 11	Ipswich Town	0–0	Huddersfield Town	Ipswich
15:00 BST	Chambers (yellow card) 21'; Smith (yellow card) 58'; Douglas (yellow card) 62'	Report	Whitehead (yellow card) 37'; Vaughan (red card)	Stadium: Portman Road; Attendance: 17,937; Referee: Martin Atkinson

21 October 2015 12	Hull City	3–0	Ipswich Town	Hull
19:45 BST	Bruce (yellow card) 25' (goal) 36'; Dawson (yellow card) 40'; Akpom 43'; Meyler 58'	Report	Coke (yellow card) 33'	Stadium: KC Stadium; Attendance: 15,942; Referee: Kevin Friend

24 October 2015 13	Nottingham Forest	1–1	Ipswich Town	Nottingham
15:00 BST	Trotter 90'	Report	Skuse (yellow card) 31'; Smith (yellow card) 44'; Parr (yellow card) 50' (goal) 74'; Berra (yellow card) 59'	Stadium: City Ground; Attendance: 19,616; Referee: Roger East

31 October 2015 14	Ipswich Town	0–0	Cardiff City	Ipswich
15:00 GMT	Smith (yellow card) 45'; Bru (yellow card) 79'; Skuse (yellow card) 87'	Report	Ameobi (yellow card) 11'; Connolly (yellow card) 34'; Ralls (yellow card) 43'; Revell (yellow card) 82'; Whittingham (yellow card) 85'	Stadium: Portman Road; Attendance: 17,169; Referee: David Coote

3 November 2015 15	Ipswich Town	2–0	Bolton	Ipswich
19:45 BST	Maitland-Niles 13'; Knudsen (yellow card) 26'; Pitman 70'; Chambers (yellow card) 80'	Report	Casado (yellow card) 7'; Madine (yellow card) 57'	Stadium: Portman Road; Attendance: 17,071; Referee: Darren Deadman

7 November 2015 16	Rotherham United	2–5	Ipswich Town	Rotherham
15:00 BST	Toffolo (yellow card) 40'; Barker 56'; Derbyshire 59'	Report	Pitman 8'; Douglas 22'; Murphy 43', 48', 72'	Stadium: AESSEAL New York Stadium; Attendance: 9,162; Referee: Darren Drysdale

21 November 2015 17	Ipswich Town	2–2	Wolverhampton Wanderers	Ipswich
15:00 GMT	Douglas 16'; Murphy 54'; Chambers (yellow card) 90'	Report	Henry (yellow card) 11', (goal) 38'; Afobe 75'; Le Fondre (yellow card) 90'	Stadium: Portman Road; Attendance: 19,227; Referee: Gavin Ward

28 November 2015 18	Charlton Athletic	0–3	Ipswich Town	Charlton
12:30 GMT	Fox (yellow card) 45'; Makienok (yellow card) 63'	Report	Murphy 28', 68'; Sears 45'	Stadium: The Valley; Attendance: 15,870; Referee: Scott Duncan

4 December 2015 19	Ipswich Town	0–2	Middlesbrough	Ipswich
19:45 BST	Berra (yellow card) 58'	Report	Gibson (yellow card) 40'; Leadbitter (yellow card) 52'; Stuani 54'; Nugent 74'	Stadium: Portman Road; Attendance: 17,662; Referee: Tim Robinson

12 December 2015 20	Milton Keynes Dons	0–1	Ipswich	Denbigh
12:30 GMT		Report	Pitman 10'; Douglas (yellow card) 21'; Chambers (yellow card) 61'; Sears (yellow card) 74'	Stadium: Stadium mk Attendance: 13,520; Referee: Gavin Ward

15 December 2015 21	Fulham	1–2	Ipswich Town	Fulham
19:45 GMT	McCormack 14'	Report	Sears 1'; Pitman 57'	Stadium: Craven Cottage; Attendance: 15,245; Referee: Trevor Kettle

19 December 2015 22	Ipswich Town	0–1	Derby County	Ipswich
15:00 GMT	Berra (yellow card) 26'; Douglas (yellow card) 68'	Report	Ince 40', (yellow card) 82'; Jacob Butterfield (yellow card) 76'	Stadium: Portman Road; Attendance: 20,161; Referee: Keith Hill

26 December 2015 23	Ipswich Town	2−1	Queens Park Rangers	Ipswich
15:00 GMT	Douglas 77'; Oar (yellow card) 88'; Chambers 90+2'	Report	Hoilett 45+3'; Konchesky (yellow card) 66'; Onuoha (yellow card) 90'	Stadium: Portman Road; Attendance: 23,615; Referee: Darren Drysdale

29 December 2015 24	Brighton & Hove Albion	0–1	Ipswich Town	Brighton
19:45 GMT	Calderón (yellow card) 82'	Report	Murphy 32'; Bru (yellow card) 34'	Stadium: Falmer Stadium; Attendance: 27,689; Referee: Stuart Attwell

2 January 2016 25	Burnley	0–0	Ipswich Town	Burnley
15:00 GMT	Lowton (yellow card) 59'; Barton (yellow card) 90'	Report		Stadium: Turf Moor; Attendance: 16,307; Referee: Peter Bankes

12 January 2016 26	Ipswich Town	2–1	Leeds United	Ipswich
19:45 GMT	Chambers 50' (yellow card) 81'; Pitman 90+2'; Douglas (yellow card) 58'	Report	Doukara 1'; Phillips (yellow card) 83'	Stadium: Portman Road; Attendance: 19,146; Referee: Fred Graham

16 January 2016 27	Ipswich Town	1–1	Preston North End	Ipswich
15:00 GMT	Murphy 38'; Pitman (yellow card) 90'	Report	Johnson 7' (yellow card) 84'; Woods (yellow card) 40'; Garner (yellow card) 69'	Stadium: Portman Road; Attendance: 21,108; Referee: Simon Hooper

23 January 2016 28	Birmingham City	3–0	Ipswich Town	Birmingham
15:00 GMT	Buckley 23'; Gleeson (yellow card) 29'; Robinson (yellow card) 49'; Toral 54'; Kieftenbeld 70'	Report	Douglas (red card) 45+2'; Smith (yellow card) 78'	Stadium: St Andrew's; Attendance: 18,272; Referee: Michael Bull

2 February 2016 29	Ipswich Town	2–1	Reading	Ipswich
19:45 GMT	Fraser 57'; Berra (yellow card) 65'; Pitman 89'	Report	Obita (yellow card) 19'; Norwood (yellow card) 45+4'; McCleary 69' (pen.)	Stadium: Portman Road; Attendance: 16,616; Referee: Tim Robinson

6 February 2016 30	Queens Park Rangers	1–0	Ipswich Town	London
15:00 GMT	Faurlín (yellow card) 34'; Onuoha (yellow card) 60'; Phillips 88'	Report	Bru (yellow card) 8'	Stadium: Loftus Road; Attendance: 17,044; Referee: Charles Breakspear

13 February 2016 31	Bristol City	2–1	Ipswich Town	Bristol
15:00 GMT	Flint 20', 35'; O'Donnell (yellow card) 90+2'	Report	Pitman 61'; Foley (yellow card) 73'	Stadium: Ashton Gate Stadium; Attendance: 15,736; Referee: Tony Harrington

23 February 2015 32	Ipswich Town	0–1	Hull City	Ipswich
19:45 GMT	Smith (yellow card) 88'	Report	Diamé 48'	Stadium: Portman Road; Attendance: 17,630; Referee: Brendan Malone

27 February 2016 33	Huddersfield Town	0–1	Ipswich Town	Huddersfield
15:00 GMT	Smith (yellow card) 74'	Report	Pringle 19'; Chambers (yellow card) 51'; Sears (yellow card) 71'; Maitland-Niles (yellow card) 90'	Stadium: John Smith's Stadium; Attendance: 12,644; Referee: Darren Bond

5 March 2016 34	Ipswich Town	1–0	Nottingham Forest	Ipswich
15:00 BST	Pringle 63'	Report		Stadium: Portman Road; Attendance: 20,658; Referee: Andy Woolmer

8 March 2016 35	Bolton Wanderers	2–2	Ipswich Town	Bolton
19:45 GMT	Wilson 73'; Spearing (yellow card) 83'; Wellington (yellow card) 90+2'; Dobbie 90+7' (pen.)	Report	Bru 24'; Berra 72'	Stadium: Macron Stadium; Attendance: 12,681; Referee: Mark Haywood

12 March 2016 36	Cardiff City	1–0	Ipswich Town	Cardiff
15:00 GMT	Ecuele 18'	Report		Stadium: Cardiff City Stadium; Attendance: 15,175; Referee: Andy Madley

15 March 2016 37	Ipswich Town	2–0	Blackburn Rovers	Ipswich
19:45 GMT	Murphy 67' (pen.), 87'	Report		Stadium: Portman Road; Attendance: 16,488; Referee: Iain Williamson

19 March 2016 38	Ipswich Town	0–1	Rotherham United	Ipswich
15:00 GMT	Knudsen (yellow card) 54'	Report	Best 44'; Halford (yellow card) 61'	Stadium: Portman Road; Attendance: 20,318; Referee: Steve Martin

2 April 2016 39	Wolverhampton Wanderers	0–0	Ipswich Town	Wolverhampton
15:00 GMT	Lenihan (yellow card) 37'; Grimes (yellow card) 60'; Bennett (yellow card) 87'	Report	Iorfa (yellow card) 72'	Stadium: Molineux; Attendance: 19,538; Referee: Mark Brown

5 April 2016 40	Ipswich Town	0–0	Charlton Athletic	Ipswich
19:45 GMT	Knudsen (yellow card) 16'	Report	Teixeira (yellow card) 46'; Cousins (yellow card) 85'	Stadium: Portman Road; Attendance: 17,787; Referee: Oliver Langford

9 April 2016 41	Ipswich Town	1–3	Brentford	Ipswich
15:00 BST	Hyam (yellow card) 3' (yellow-red card) 45+5'; Varney (yellow card) 57'; Feeney 88'	Report	Saunders 29'; Woods (yellow card) 45+5'; Vibe 64', 68'	Stadium: Portman Road; Attendance: 18,845; Referee: Phil Gibbs

16 April 2016 42	Sheffield Wednesday	1–1	Ipswich Town	Sheffield
15:00 BST	Forestieri 42'; Wallace (yellow card) 69'	Report	Bru (yellow card) 69'; Dozzell 71'; Pitman (yellow card) 79'; Chambers (yellow card) 90+3'	Stadium: Hillsborough; Attendance: 25,082; Referee: Robert Madley

19 April 2016 43	Ipswich Town	1–1	Fulham	Ipswich
19:45 BST	Knudsen 90+1'; Smith (yellow card) 90+4'	Report	Dembélé 66'; Parker (yellow card) 86'	Stadium: Portman Road; Attendance: 16,953; Referee: Paul Tierney

23 April 2016 44	Middlesbrough	0–0	Ipswich Town	Middlesbrough
	Leadbitter (yellow card) 84'	Report	Hyam (yellow card) 30'	Stadium: Riverside Stadium; Attendance: 30,505; Referee: Darren Bond

30 April 2016 45	Ipswich Town	3–2	Milton Keynes Dons	Ipswich
	McGoldrick 16'; Pitman 68'; Smith (yellow card) 87'; Varney 90'	Report	Powell (yellow card) 35'; Revell 45', 74'	Stadium: Portman Road; Attendance: 19,631; Referee: Keith Stroud

7 May 2016 46	Derby County	0–1	Ipswich Town	Derby
	Keogh (yellow card) 44'; Martin (yellow card) 65'	Report	Chambers (yellow card) 31'; McGoldrick 34'; McDonnell (yellow card) 39'	Stadium: Pride Park Stadium; Attendance: 29,854; Referee: Tim Robinson

=== FA Cup ===
9 January 2016 Third round	Ipswich Town	2–2	Portsmouth	Ipswich
15:00 GMT	Skuse (yellow card) 45'; Oar 53'; Fraser 88'	Report	Bennett 55'; Chaplin 86'; Barton (yellow card) 90+1'	Stadium: Portman Road; Attendance: 17,020; Referee: David Coote

19 January 2016 Third round replay	Portsmouth	2–1	Ipswich Town	Portsmouth
19:45 GMT	Roberts 32' (pen.); McNulty 37'	Report	Malarczyk (yellow card) 14' (yellow-red card) 77'; Maitland-Niles 60'	Stadium: Fratton Park; Attendance: 15,179; Referee: Andy Woolmer

=== League Cup ===
On 16 June 2015, the first round draw was made, Ipswich Town were drawn at home against Stevenage. Ipswich Town were drawn away to Doncaster Rovers in the second round. The third round draw was made on 25 August 2015 live on Sky Sports by Charlie Nicholas and Phil Thompson. Ipswich Town were drawn away to Manchester United.

11 August 2015 First round	Ipswich Town	2–1	Stevenage	Ipswich
19:45 BST	Yorwerth 55'; Tabb 76'	Report	Berra 34' (o.g.)	Stadium: Portman Road; Attendance: 10,449; Referee: Fred Graham

25 August 2015 Second round	Doncaster Rovers	1–4 (a.e.t.)	Ipswich Town	Doncaster
19:45 BST	Williams 23'	Report	Pitman 58'; McGoldrick 102'; Alabi 105'; Fraser 113'	Stadium: Keepmoat Stadium; Attendance: 3,729; Referee: Scott Duncan

23 September 2015 Third round	Manchester United	3–0	Ipswich Town	Greater Manchester
19:45 BST	Rooney 23'; Pereira 60'; Martial 90'	Report		Stadium: Old Trafford; Attendance: 56,607; Referee: Simon Hooper

== Transfers ==
=== Transfers in ===
Date from	Position	Nationality	Name	From	Fee	Ref.
23 June 2015	CB	WAL	Josh Yorwerth	(Wales) Cardiff City	Free transfer	
26 June 2015	CF	JER	Brett Pitman	(England) Bournemouth	Undisclosed	
31 July 2015	LB	DEN	Jonas Knudsen	(Denmark) Esbjerg	Undisclosed (Note: Fee reported as £350,000)	
3 August 2015	CM	ENG	Giles Coke	(England) Sheffield Wednesday	Free transfer	
3 August 2015	RW	GUI	Larsen Touré	(France) Arles-Avignon	Free transfer	
4 August 2015	CM	IRL	Jonathan Douglas	(England) Brentford	Free transfer	
20 August 2015	GK	SCO	Jonathan Henly	(England) Reading	Free transfer	
24 August 2015	CF	ENG	James Alabi	(England) Stoke City	Free transfer	
28 August 2015	CB	POL	Piotr Malarczyk	(Poland) Korona Kielce	Undisclosed (Note: Fee reported as £8,500)	
28 August 2015	LW	AUS	Tommy Oar	(Netherlands) Utrecht	Free transfer	
22 January 2016	RB	IRL	Kevin Foley	Free agent	Free transfer	

=== Loans in ===
Date from	Position	Nationality	Name	From	Until	Ref.
25 June 2015	RM	SCO	Ryan Fraser	(England) Bournemouth	End of season	(Note: Fraser's loan to Ipswich Town was included with the £8,000,000 sale of Tyrone Mings.)
2 July 2015	RM	ENG	Ainsley Maitland-Niles	(England) Arsenal	End of Season	
2 January 2016	CM	ENG	Paul Digby	(England) Barnsley	End of Season	
12 February 2016	LW	ENG	Ben Pringle	(England) Fulham	24 April 2016	
17 March 2016	RW	ENG	Liam Feeney	(England) Bolton Wanderers	End of Season	

=== Transfers out ===
Date from	Position	Nationality	Name	To	Fee	Ref.
1 July 2015	LM	ENG	Darren Ambrose	(England) Colchester United	Released	
1 July 2015	RW	ENG	Paul Anderson	(England) Bradford City	Released	(Note: Following Anderson's release he joined Bradford City.)
1 July 2015	RB	WAL	Elliott Hewitt	(England) Notts County	Released	(Note: Following Hewitt's release he joined Notts County.)
1 July 2015	CF	ENG	Jack Marriott	(England) Luton Town	Free transfer	(Note: Following Marriott's release he joined Luton Town.)
1 July 2015	CF	IRL	Noel Hunt	(England) Southend United	Free transfer	(Note: Following Hunt's release he joined Southend United.)
1 July 2015	LM	IRL	Stephen Hunt	(England) Coventry City	Released	
1 July 2015	GK	IRE	Paddy Kenny	Free agent	Released	
24 June 2015	CB	ENG	Omar Sowunmi	(England) Yeovil Town	Free transfer	
25 June 2015	LB	ENG	Tyrone Mings	(England) Bournemouth	£8,000,000 (Note: Fee could potentially rise to £10,000,000 with add-ons)	
3 July 2015	LM	ENG	Anthony Wordsworth	(England) Southend United	Free transfer	
28 August 2015	CB	ENG	Harry Clarke	(England) Arsenal	Compensation	
21 December 2015	AM	IRL	Dylan Connolly	(Republic of Ireland) Bray Wanderers	Free transfer	
1 January 2016	CM	WAL	Jack Collison	Free agent	Released	
13 January 2016	LB	NOR	Jonathan Parr	(Norway) Strømsgodset	Undisclosed (Note: Fee reported as £70,000)	
22 January 2016	LW	AUS	Tommy Oar	(Australia) Brisbane Roar	Released	
28 January 2016	CF	ENG	James Alabi	Free agent	Mutual consent	
1 February 2016	LM	ENG	Alex Henshall	Free agent	Mutual consent	
1 March 2016	CF	ENG	Sam Ford	(England) West Ham United	Free transfer	

=== Loans out ===
Date from	Position	Nationality	Name	To	Date until	Ref.
3 August 2015	CB	ENG	Matthew Clarke	(England) Portsmouth	3 January 2016	
28 August 2015	LW	ENG	Cameron Stewart	(England) Doncaster Rovers	2 January 2016	
29 September 2015	CB	WAL	Josh Yorwerth	(England) Crawley Town	25 October 2015	
25 November 2015	CF	ENG	James Alabi	(England) Grimsby Town	1 January 2016	
26 November 2015	CM	ENG	Luke Hyam	(England) Rotherham United	20 December 2015	
26 November 2015	RB	ENG	Josh Emmanuel	(England) Crawley Town	3 January 2016	
26 November 2015	GK	WAL	Michael Crowe	(England) Stevenage	10 January 2016	
22 February 2016	CB	ENG	Joe Robinson	(England) Woking	1 June 2016	
11 January 2016	GK	WAL	Michael Crowe	(England) Braintree Town	11 March 2016	
24 March 2016	CB	POL	Piotr Malarczyk	(England) Southend United	1 June 2016	

== Squad statistics ==
All statistics updated as of end of season

=== Appearances and goals ===
No.	Pos	Nat	Player	Total		Championship		FA Cup		League Cup	
No.	Pos	Nat	Player	Apps	Goals	Apps	Goals	Apps	Goals	Apps	Goals
Goalkeepers
1	GK	(England) ENG	Dean Gerken	28	0	26	0	0	0	2	0
33	GK	(Poland) POL	Bartosz Białkowski	23	0	20	0	2	0	1	0
Defenders
3	DF	(Denmark) DEN	Jonas Knudsen	43	1	42	1	1	0	0	0
4	DF	(England) ENG	Luke Chambers	48	3	45	3	1	0	1+1	0
5	DF	(New Zealand) NZL	Tommy Smith	48	2	45	2	0+1	0	1+1	0
6	DF	(Scotland) SCO	Christophe Berra	44	1	43	1	0	0	1	0
25	DF	(Wales) WAL	Josh Yorwerth	3	1	0	0	0	0	3	1
29	DF	(England) ENG	Josh Emmanuel	7	0	3+1	0	1	0	2	0
30	DF	(England) ENG	Myles Kenlock	5	0	2	0	1	0	2	0
44	DF	(Republic of Ireland) IRL	Kevin Foley	8	0	6+2	0	0	0	0	0
Midfielders
7	MF	(England) ENG	Ainsley Maitland-Niles	32	2	21+9	1	2	1	0	0
8	MF	(England) ENG	Cole Skuse	40	0	39	0	1	0	0	0
12	MF	(England) ENG	Liam Feeney	9	1	7+2	1	0	0	0	0
14	MF	(Scotland) SCO	Ryan Fraser	21	6	15+3	4	0+1	1	0+2	1
15	MF	(England) ENG	Ben Pringle	10	2	9+1	2	0	0	0	0
16	MF	(England) ENG	Giles Coke	14	0	1+9	0	0+1	0	3	0
17	MF	(Mauritius) MRI	Kévin Bru	29	2	20+8	2	0	0	1	0
18	MF	(Republic of Ireland) IRL	Jay Tabb	4	1	0	0	1	0	3	1
19	MF	(England) ENG	Luke Hyam	17	0	9+6	0	2	0	0	0
22	MF	(Republic of Ireland) IRL	Jonathan Douglas	39	3	32+6	3	0	0	1	0
26	MF	(Republic of Ireland) IRL	Adam McDonnell	2	0	1	0	0	0	1	0
27	MF	(England) ENG	Teddy Bishop	4	0	2+2	0	0	0	0	0
37	MF	(England) ENG	Paul Digby	4	0	1+3	0	0	0	0	0
39	MF	(Guinea) GUI	Larsen Touré	11	0	3+4	0	0+1	0	2+1	0
41	MF	(England) ENG	Andre Dozzell	2	1	1+1	1	0	0	0	0}
42	MF	(England) ENG	Luke Varney	20	1	2+16	1	2	0	0	0
Forwards
9	FW	(Republic of Ireland) IRL	Daryl Murphy	35	10	30+4	10	0	0	1	0
10	FW	(Republic of Ireland) IRL	David McGoldrick	27	5	9+15	4	0	0	3	1
11	FW	Jersey	Brett Pitman	47	11	24+18	10	2	0	2+1	1
20	FW	(England) ENG	Freddie Sears	47	6	44+1	6	0+1	0	0+1	0
Players transferred out during the season
2	DF	(Norway) NOR	Jonathan Parr	10	1	3+6	1	0	0	1	0
12	FW	(England) ENG	James Alabi	1	1	0	0	0	0	0+1	1
15	MF	(Australia) AUS	Tommy Oar	9	1	1+5	0	2	1	1	0
21	DF	(Poland) POL	Piotr Malarczyk	6	0	0+3	0	2	0	1	0
34	DF	(England) ENG	Joe Robinson	1	0	0	0	0+1	0	0	0

Last updated: end of season
Source: Competitions

=== Goalscorers ===
No.	Pos	Nat	Player	Championship	FA Cup	League Cup	Total
11	FW	(Jersey)	Brett Pitman	10	0	1	11
9	FW	(Republic of Ireland)	Daryl Murphy	10	0	0	10
14	MF	(Scotland)	Ryan Fraser	4	1	1	6
20	FW	(England)	Freddie Sears	6	0	0	6
10	FW	(Republic of Ireland)	David McGoldrick	4	0	1	5
4	DF	(England)	Luke Chambers	3	0	0	3
22	MF	(Republic of Ireland)	Jonathan Douglas	3	0	0	3
5	DF	(New Zealand)	Tommy Smith	2	0	0	2
7	MF	(England)	Ainsley Maitland-Niles	1	1	0	2
15	MF	(England)	Ben Pringle	2	0	0	2
17	MF	(Mauritius)	Kévin Bru	2	0	0	2
2	DF	(Norway)	Jonathan Parr	1	0	0	1
3	DF	(Denmark)	Jonas Knudsen	1	0	0	1
6	DF	(Scotland)	Christophe Berra	1	0	0	1
12	FW	(England)	James Alabi	0	0	1	1
12	MF	(England)	Liam Feeney	1	0	0	1
15	DF	(Australia)	Tommy Oar	0	1	0	1
18	MF	(Republic of Ireland)	Jay Tabb	0	0	1	1
25	DF	(Wales)	Josh Yorwerth	0	0	1	1
41	MF	(England)	Andre Dozzell	1	0	0	1
42	MF	(England)	Luke Varney	1	0	0	1
Total				53	3	6	62

=== Assists ===
No.	Pos	Nat	Player	Championship	FA Cup	League Cup	Total
20	FW	(England)	Freddie Sears	9	0	0	9
4	DF	(England)	Luke Chambers	5	0	0	5
10	FW	(Republic of Ireland)	David McGoldrick	1	0	4	5
9	FW	(Republic of Ireland)	Daryl Murphy	4	0	0	4
5	DF	(New Zealand)	Tommy Smith	3	0	0	3
11	FW	(England)	Brett Pitman	3	0	0	3
14	MF	(Scotland)	Ryan Fraser	2	0	1	3
3	DF	(Denmark)	Jonas Knudsen	2	0	0	2
7	MF	(England)	Ainsley Maitland-Niles	2	0	0	2
20	FW	(Mauritius)	Kévin Bru	2	0	0	2
42	FW	(England)	Luke Varney	2	0	0	2
6	DF	(Scotland)	Christophe Berra	1	0	0	1
12	MF	(England)	Liam Feeney	1	0	0	1
22	MF	(Republic of Ireland)	Jonathan Douglas	1	0	0	1
29	DF	(England)	Josh Emmanuel	1	0	0	1
30	DF	(England)	Myles Kenlock	1	0	0	1
39	MF	(Guinea)	Larsen Touré	0	0	1	1
44	DF	(Republic of Ireland)	Kevin Foley	1	0	0	1
Total				41	0	6	47

=== Clean sheets ===
No.	Nat	Player	Championship	FA Cup	League Cup	Total
1	(England)	Dean Gerken	8	0	0	8
33	(Poland)	Bartosz Białkowski	8	0	0	8
Total			16	0	0	16

=== Disciplinary record ===
No.	Pos	Nat	Player	Championship		FA Cup		League Cup		Total	
No.	Pos	Nat	Player	Yellow card	Red card	Yellow card	Red card	Yellow card	Red card	Yellow card	Red card
2	DF	(Norway)	Jonathan Parr	2	0	0	0	1	0	3	0
3	DF	(Denmark)	Jonas Knudsen	5	0	0	0	0	0	5	0
4	DF	(England)	Luke Chambers	9	0	0	0	0	0	9	0
5	DF	(New Zealand)	Tommy Smith	7	0	0	0	0	0	7	0
6	DF	(Scotland)	Christophe Berra	6	0	0	0	0	0	6	0
7	MF	(England)	Ainsley Maitland-Niles	3	0	0	0	0	0	3	0
8	MF	(England)	Cole Skuse	3	0	1	0	0	0	4	0
11	FW	(Jersey)	Brett Pitman	3	0	0	0	0	0	3	0
14	MF	(Scotland)	Ryan Fraser	3	0	0	0	0	0	3	0
15	MF	(Australia)	Tommy Oar	1	0	0	0	0	0	1	0
16	MF	(England)	Giles Coke	1	0	0	0	1	0	2	0
17	MF	(Mauritius)	Kévin Bru	4	0	0	0	0	0	4	0
19	DF	(England)	Luke Hyam	3	1	0	0	0	0	3	1
20	FW	(England)	Freddie Sears	2	0	0	0	0	0	2	0
21	DF	(Poland)	Piotr Malarczyk	0	0	0	1	0	0	0	1
22	MF	(Republic of Ireland)	Jonathan Douglas	7	1	0	0	0	0	7	1
24	MF	(Republic of Ireland)	Adam McDonnell	1	0	0	0	0	0	1	0
30	DF	(England)	Myles Kenlock	0	0	0	0	2	0	2	0
39	MF	(Guinea)	Larsen Touré	1	0	0	0	1	0	2	0
42	MF	(England)	Luke Varney	1	0	0	0	0	0	1	0
44	DF	(Republic of Ireland)	Kevin Foley	1	0	0	0	0	0	1	0
Total				63	2	1	1	5	0	69	3

== Awards ==
=== Player awards ===
Award	Player	Ref
Player of the Year	(Poland) Bartosz Białkowski	
Players' Player of the Year	(Poland) Bartosz Białkowski	
Young Player of the Year	(England) Andre Dozzell	
Goal of the Season	(Mauritius) Kévin Bru	

=== Football League Championship Manager of the Month ===
Month	Manager	Ref
November	(Republic of Ireland) Mick McCarthy	

=== Football League Championship Player of the Month ===
Month	Player	Ref
November	(Republic of Ireland) Daryl Murphy	
