= Joe Robinson (footballer, born 1996) =

English footballer

Personal information
- Full name: Joe Alan Robinson
- Date of birth: 10 August 1996 (age 30)
- Place of birth: Haverhill, England
- Position: Centre back

Team information
- Current team: Newmarket Town

Youth career
- 2008–2015: Ipswich Town

Senior career*
Years	Team	Apps	(Gls)
2015–2017	Ipswich Town	0	(0)
2016	→ Woking (loan)	6	(0)
2016	→ Boston United (loan)	13	(1)
2017	→ St Albans City (loan)	6	(0)
2017–2018	Bishop's Stortford	44	(5)
2018–2019	Cambridge City	18	(1)
2019	King's Lynn Town	10	(0)
2019–	Newmarket Town	78	(9)
2024	→ Haverhill Borough (loan)	6	(0)
- * Club domestic league appearances and goals as of 21:27, 4 March 2025 (UTC)

Joe Alan Robinson (born 10 August 1996) is an English footballer who plays as a defender for Newmarket Town.

== Playing career ==
In 2008, Robinson joined Championship side Ipswich Town at the age of 12. After rapidly progressing through the Ipswich Town youth sides since his arrival, Robinson has captained both under-18 and under-21 sides. On 28 November 2015, after some fine form in the under-21 side, Robinson was named on the bench in Ipswich Town's 3–0 away victory over Charlton Athletic, however he failed to feature. On 19 January 2016, Robinson made his senior debut in a 2–1 defeat to Portsmouth in the FA Cup, replacing Ainsley Maitland-Niles in the 89th minute.

On 22 February 2016, Robinson joined National League side Woking on a one-month loan deal until 28 March 2016. On 23 February 2016, Robinson made his Woking debut in a 3–1 away defeat against Grimsby Town, playing the full 90 minutes. On 1 April 2016, Robinson's loan spell at Woking was extended until the end of the 2015/16 campaign. However, Robinson's loan spell at Woking was cut short in mid April.

On 25 August 2016, Robinson joined National League North side Boston United on a one-month loan deal, to gain first-team experience. Two days later, Robinson made his Boston United debut in a 1–1 home draw against Kidderminster Harriers, scoring an own goal to give the visitors the lead.

On 3 March 2017, Robinson joined National League South side St Albans City on a one-month loan deal. A day later, Robinson made his St Albans debut in their 1–0 home defeat against Bishop's Stortford, featuring for the entire 90 minutes. Robinson went onto feature in five more games for St Albans before returning to Ipswich at the end of the campaign.

On 18 May 2017, it was announced that Robinson would leave Ipswich at the end of the 2016–17 campaign upon the expiry of his current deal.

Following his release from Ipswich, Robinson joined Southern League Premier Division side Bishop's Stortford. Following an impressive first season with the Blues, in which he featured in forty-four league games all season, scoring five times, Robinson signed a new one-year deal ahead of the 2018–19 campaign.

Despite signing a new one-year deal with Bishop's Stortford, Robinson opted to re-unite with his brother Ben, at Cambridge City.

On 2 January 2019, Robinson joined Southern League Premier Central side King's Lynn Town.

On 31 May 2019, after finishing the campaign with King's Lynn Town, Robinson agreed to join Newmarket Town ahead of the 2019–20 campaign. On 20 July 2020, despite signing a new one-year deal, Robinson was banned from all footballing activities for 10 months due to betting breaches.

== Career statistics ==
As of match played 4 March 2025.

Appearances and goals by club, season and competition
Club	Season	League			FA Cup		League Cup		Other		Total	
Club	Season	Division	Apps	Goals	Apps	Goals	Apps	Goals	Apps	Goals	Apps	Goals
Ipswich Town	2015–16	Championship	0	0	1	0	0	0	—		1	0
Ipswich Town	2016–17	Championship	0	0	0	0	0	0	—		0	0
Ipswich Town	Total		0	0	1	0	0	0	—		1	0
Woking (loan)	2015–16	National League	6	0	0	0	—		1 (Note: Appearance(s) in FA Trophy)	0	7	0
Boston United (loan)	2016–17	National League North	13	1	2	0	—		1	0	16	1
St Albans City (loan)	2016–17	National League South	6	0	—		—		—		6	0
Bishop's Stortford	2017–18	Southern League Premier Division	44	5	1	0	—		3 (Note: One appearance in Southern League Cup, two in FA Trophy)	0	48	5
Cambridge City	2018–19	Southern League Division One Central	18	1	2	0	—		3 (Note: One appearance in Southern League Cup, two in FA Trophy)	0	23	1
King's Lynn Town	2018–19	Southern League Premier Division	10	0	—		—		0	0	10	0
Newmarket Town	2019–20	Eastern Counties League Premier Division	23	4	2	1	—		4 (Note: Three appearances in the FA Vase, one in the Eastern Counties League Premier Division League Cup)	0	29	5
Newmarket Town	2020–21	Eastern Counties League Premier Division	0	0	0	0	—		0	0	0	0
Newmarket Town	2021–22	Eastern Counties League Premier Division	30	4	2	0	—		3 (Note: Appearances in the FA Vase)	1	35	5
Newmarket Town	2022–23	Eastern Counties League Premier Division	7	0	2	0	—		1	0	10	0
Newmarket Town	2023–24	Eastern Counties League Premier Division	0	0	0	0	—		0	0	0	0
Newmarket Town	2024–25	Isthmian League North Division	18	1	0	0	—		1 (Note: Appearance in the Alan Turvey Trophy)	0	19	1
Newmarket Town	Total		78	9	6	1	—		9	1	93	11
Haverhill Borough (loan)	2024–25	Eastern Counties League Division One North	6	0	—		—		3 (Note: Two appearances and one goal in the Eastern Counties League First Division League Cup, one appearance in the FA Vase)	1	9	1
Career total			181	16	12	1	0	0	20	2	213	19
