= Kévin Bru =

Association football player (born 1988)

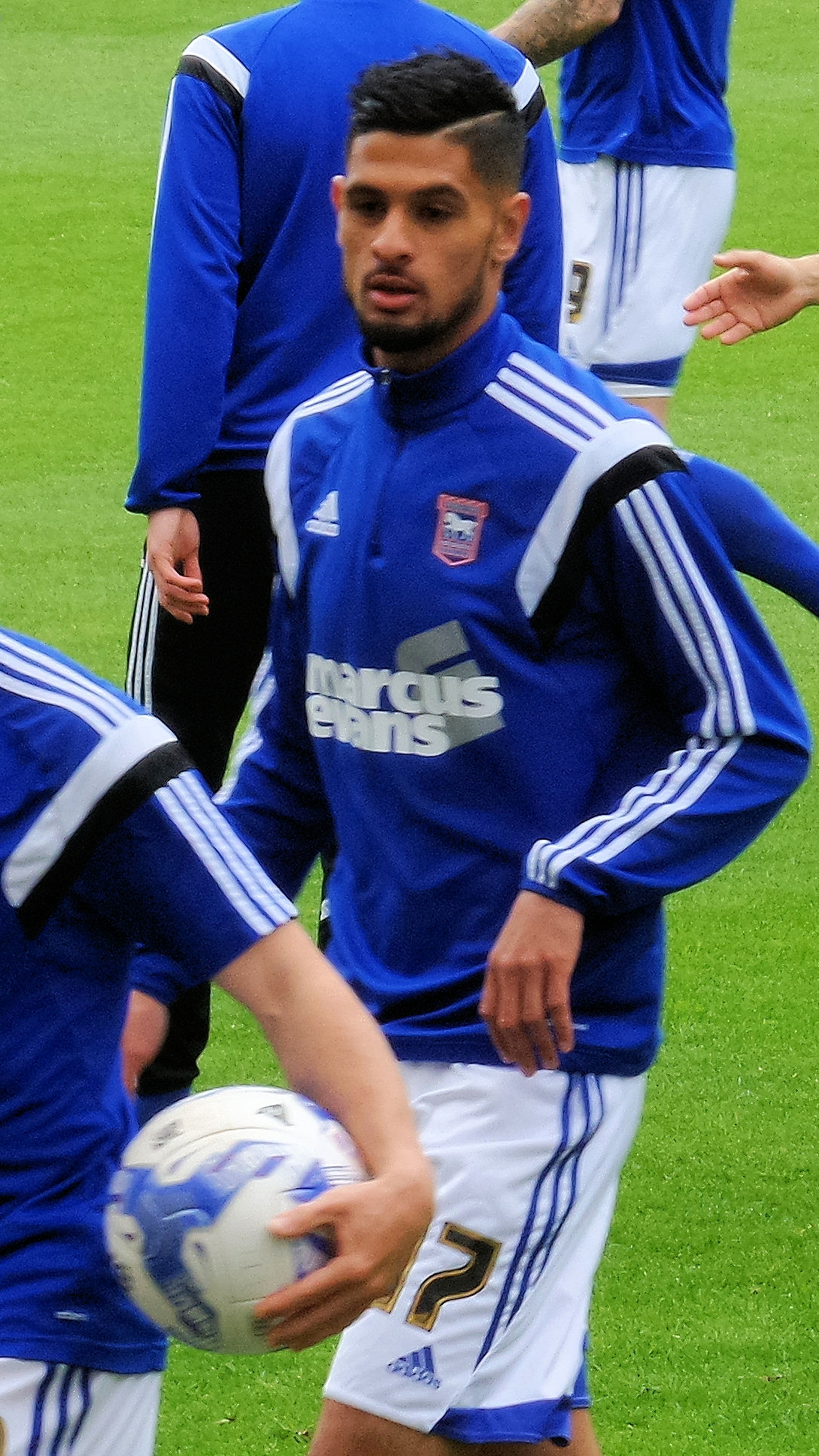
- Bru with Ipswich Town in 2015

Personal information
- Full name: Kévin Bru
- Date of birth: 12 December 1988 (age 37)
- Place of birth: Paris, France
- Height: 1.84 m (6 ft 0 in)
- Position: Midfielder

Youth career
- 2001-2003: INF Clairefontaine
- 2003–2006: Rennes

Senior career*
Years	Team	Apps	(Gls)
2004–2010	Rennes	2	(0)
2007–2008	→ Châteauroux (loan)	10	(0)
2008–2009	→ Clermont (loan)	25	(2)
2010–2011	Dijon	25	(2)
2011–2012	Boulogne	28	(3)
2012–2013	Istres	31	(2)
2013–2014	Levski Sofia	20	(1)
2014–2018	Ipswich Town	94	(4)
2018–2019	Apollon Limassol	17	(4)
2019	Dinamo București	8	(0)
2020–2021	Créteil	13	(1)
2021–2022	Versailles	1	(0)
2022–2023	C'Chartres	18	(1)
2023–2024	ÍBV	8	(0)

International career^{‡}
2005	France U18	3	(0)
2007	France U19	4	(0)
2011–2026	Mauritius	32	(3)
- * Club domestic league appearances and goals as of 10 November 2023 ‡ National team caps and goals as of 29 June 2024

Kévin Bru (born 12 December 1988) is a professional footballer who plays as a midfielder. Born in France, he represented France at youth international level before playing for Mauritius national football team.

== Club career ==
=== Rennes ===
Born in Paris, Bru initially played for the youth teams of US Paris 11th and Paris FC before training at the INF Clairefontaine academy (France national Football team Centre). He then moved to Rennes, like his brother Jonathan Bru in 2003. Bru started out at the reserve side and helped them win the reserve league. Bru later revealed that Premier League side Tottenham Hotspur offered him a contract, but rejected the move, opting to stay in France instead.

Bru made his Stade Rennais debut on 6 January 2007, where he came on as a substitute for Sylvain Marveaux in the second half, in a 3–1 loss against Romorantin in the first round of Coupe de France. Thirteen days later, he signed his first professional contract with the club, for three years. On 24 January, he made his league debut for the club, as a late substitute in a 2–0 win over Monaco. Bru made another appearance for the side in the league, also coming on as a late substitute, in a 2–0 loss against Sedan on 24 February. At the end of the 2006–07 season, Bru went on to make three appearances in all competitions for Rennes.

Ahead of the 2007–08 season, Bru was named as one of four youngsters to watch by Stade Rennais Online. He also signed a contract extension with the club, keeping him until 2011. It wasn't until on 31 October 2007 when Bru made his first appearance for Stade Rennais, starting a match and played 64 minutes before substituted, in a 2–0 loss against Valenciennes in the round of 16 of Coupe de la Ligue. However, he spent the first half of the season on the substitutes' bench in a number of matches before being loaned out in January.

On 4 January 2008, Bru was loaned out to Châteauroux for the rest of the 2007–08 season. He made his Châteauroux debut, starting the whole game and played 77 minutes before being substituted, in a 2–1 loss against Nantes on 11 January. He was named Player of the Month by the club's supporters. Bru went on to make 10 appearances for Châteauroux.

Bru was loaned out again to Clermont for the rest of the 2008–09 season, along with teammate Lhadji Badiane. He made his debut for the club as a substitute for Guillaume Loriot in the 23rd minute, in a 1–0 loss against Vannes in the opening game of the season, and in his second appearance he set up a goal for Badiane in a 2–2 draw against Brest. Bru became a first team regular at Clermont, where he played in the midfield position. He then scored two goals on 9 and 16 January against Bastia and Brest. However, injuries restricted his appearances. Bru went on to make 26 appearances and scored once in all competitions.

Ahead of the 2009–10 season, Bru was expected to be loaned out again, having been dropped from the first team training in the pre–season. This led to him to leave the club to pursue first team football.

=== Dijon ===
On 7 January 2010, Dijon signed Bru from Rennes until June 2011. He made his debut 12 days later as a 25th-minute substitute in a 1–2 draw against Caen. He scored his first Dijon goal on 29 January, in a 2–1 loss against Nîmes. Bru went on to make 14 appearances for the side.

In the 2010–11 season, Bru continued to feature in the first team despite being behind in the pecking order at the start of the season. After making 11 appearances for the side, his contract with Dijon was terminated early.

=== Boulogne ===
Bru signed with fellow Ligue 2 team Boulogne on a two-year contract on 1 February 2011. He came on as a substitute for Mustapha Yatabaré, in a 1–0 win over Istres on his debut on 12 February. At the end of the 2010–11 season, Bru had made nine appearances for the club.

Ahead of the 2011–12 season, Bru missed the first four months due to an injury. He made 20 appearances and scored twice over all competitions. Bru was linked a move away from the club, with Novara Calcio and ChievoVerona after he said that he wanted to leave the club.

=== Istres ===
Despite visiting the infrastructures of the Bulgarian club Levski Sofia in the summer 2012, Bru decided to stay in France by joining Ligue 2 side Istres, thus giving up on hopes of playing in the Europa League in the following season.

Bru made Istres debut in the opening game of the season, where he started the whole game and set up the equaliser by Nassim Akrour in a 1–1 draw against Nantes. In a follow–up match against Gazélec Ajaccio on 2 August 2012, Bru scored his first Istres goal, in a 2–0 win. Two months later on 26 October 2012 against Tours, he played an important in the match, setting up first goal of the game before scoring a goal for himself, in a 4–1 win. Although Bru became a first team regular at Istres, he, however, was soon plagued by injuries. This also combined with suspension when Bru missed the last game of the season after picking up six yellow cards in the league this season. At the end of the 2012–13 season, Bru had made 33 appearances and scored twice over all competitions.

=== Levski Sofia ===
Bru signed a three-year contract with First Professional Football League side PFC Levski Sofia on 10 June 2013. The move was reported to have cost €250,000. Prior to this, Bru was on the verge of joining Levski Sofia but rejected the move, citing family reasons.

Bru made his Levski Sofia debut in the opening game of the season, where he started in a 2–1 loss against Botev Plovdiv. He established himself in the starting eleven for the side, playing in the midfield position under manager Slaviša Jokanović. Following the departure of Jokanović, Bru then suffered an injury in late October. He returned on 8 November 2013 as a late substitute, in a 1–0 loss against Beroe Stara Zagora. Against Litex Lovech on 23 November, Bru scored his first goal for the club in a 4–1 win.

Bru suffered another injury on two occasions that kept him out for two months. After returning, he struggled to regain his first team place. When the club blocked his international call–up with Mauritius, Bru threatened to take his case to FIFA, leading the club to reverse their decision. Upon returning, Bru was removed from the first team, which was welcomed by the club's supporters. Bru made a total of 26 appearances and scored once in his first season at Levski Sofia.

It was announced on 27 May 2014 that Bru had left the club by mutual consent despite having two years contract left. After his departure from the club, Bru reflected his time at Levski Sofia and adapting in Bulgaria.

=== Ipswich Town ===
On 31 July 2014, Ipswich Town manager Mick McCarthy confirmed that Bru had signed for the club following a successful trial.

Bru made his Ipswich Town debut, where he came on as a late substitute, in a 2–1 win over Fulham in the opening game of the season. Four days later, he made his first start for the side, in the first round of the League Cup, in a 1–0 loss against Crawley Town after the game went extra time. At the start of the 2014–15 season, Bru "quickly got to grips with the EFL Championship slightly quicker" and soon established himself in the first team. Bru also became the club's fan favourite and was chant of "shouting Bru rather than boo!" He signed a contract with the club, keeping him until 2018. In addition, Bru was named the club's Player of the Month for January. He scored his first goal for the club in a 4–2 victory against Birmingham City on 24 February 2015. Shortly, Bru conducted an interview with SO FOOT.com, where he spoke about playing under manager Mick McCarthy and compared the Championship to Ligue 1. Bru later helped the club reach the play-offs but was unsuccessful after losing to local rival Norwich City 4–2 on aggregate. However, injuries restricted his appearances, as the 2014–15 season was coming towards the end. Despite this, Bru finished his first season at Ipswich Town with 36 appearances and one goal across all competitions.

In the opening game of the 2015–16 season, Bru scored Ipswich Town's first goal of the season "when he – in acres of space – was producing a fine scissor kick finish from 10 yards out", in a 2–2 draw against Brentford. Bru was sidelined after suffering a hamstring injury in training in the same month and was sidelined for a month. He returned on 20 October when he played the entirety of a 3–0 loss against Hull City. After returning from injury, Bru started in the next five matches for the club until another injury occurred in late November. After returning to the first team from injury in mid–December, Bru regained his first team place, rotating in either the attacking midfield and central-midfield positions. On 8 March 2016 he scored a "sensational first-half strike", in a 2–2 draw against Bolton Wanderers, named the club's Goal of the Year. At the end of the 2015–16 season, Bru had made 29 appearances and scored two goals in all competitions.

Bru continued to play in the midfield position despite facing competition in 2016–17, and then found himself behind the pecking order and appeared on the substitutes' bench. He scored his first goal of the season on 30 December 2016, in a 2–1 win over Bristol City. However, his form and place soon dropped, which resulted in him having less playing time. Bru made 28 appearances and scored once across all competitions.

Ahead of the 2017–18 season, Bru was placed on the transfer list and told that he could leave the club. At one point, Bru was involved in a transfer move, which involved Rotherham United's Danny Ward, but the move never happened and Ward went to Cardiff City. He also revealed that his potential move to Toulouse fell through at the last minute. Bru was not given a shirt number by Ipswich, and found himself behind the pecking order for the side at the start of the season. With his first team opportunities limited and having failed to find a club, Bru trained with the first team to keep himself fit. He made his first appearance of the season on 28 October 2017, as a substitute in a 2–1 win over Burton Albion. Bru's return to the first team in the next three matches was praised by manager McCarthy. After suffering from a rib injury in December 2017, Bru then made his 100th appearance for the side, in a 1–0 loss against Wolverhampton Wanderers on 23 December. Although he remained on the transfer list, Bru stayed at the club for the rest of the season, due to injury crisis in the midfield section and ultimately being pushed to leave the club in January. At the end of the 2017–18 season, Bru had made 10 appearances over all competitions. Bru left the club in April 2018. By the time of his departure, Bru made 103 appearances and scored 4 times during his time at Ipswich Town.

=== Later career ===
On 14 June 2018, Bru signed for Cypriot First Division club Apollon Limassol. A year later, he signed a contract with Romanian club Dinamo București. He was released in November 2019, after nine games for Dinamo, eight in Liga I and one in Cupa României.

After nine months without a club, Bru returned to France with Créteil in October 2020. He made his debut in a Coupe de France fifth-round game, and scored a goal in his first Championnat National game against Boulogne on 23 October 2020.

On 17 January 2022, Bru signed for Championnat National 2 side Versailles. He was part of the club's squad that reached the Coupe de France semi-finals.

On 21 June 2022, Bru signed with C'Chartres, also in Championnat National 2. On 17 August 2023, Icelandic club ÍBV signed Bru.

== International career ==
Bru made several appearances for the France under-18 and under-19 team, but never represented the senior team.

Due to his Mauritian parentage, Bru chose to represent their national team in 2011. He earned his first cap on 5 June 2011, in their AFCON qualifying match against DR Congo. Three years later, Bru was called up to the national team again and played his first match on 20 April 2014, a 2–0 loss against Mauritania. On 28 March 2017, Bru captained Mauritius for the first time in his career and set up a goal for Walter Duprey St. Martin, in a 1–1 draw against Comoros. He has captained the country. On 22 March 2018, he scored his first goal for Mauritius in a 1–0 win over Macau.

== Personal life ==
Bru's parents are from Mauritius. His brother Jonathan is also a former footballer and also represented Mauritius internationally with the Mauritius national football team. Growing up in Paris, France, Bru reflected on his childhood, saying: "It was a hard, tough area where I grew up and I have got friends who have been in prison and are still in prison, Who knows what would have happened to me if I didn't make it as a footballer? Maybe I would have got dragged down that road that some of my friends have gone, I don't know. From the age of six though, I always wanted to play football and my brother and I would play every minute that we had that was free."

In addition to speaking French, Bru learned Bulgarian and English while playing in those countries. His agent is Antoine Sibierski, who recommended his move to Ipswich Town.

In February 2015, Bru's dog Grizzler went missing in Claydon, and was found after he appealed on Twitter. In June 2017, Bru was convicted of a series of motoring offences, resulting in him being banned from driving for 12 months.

== Career statistics ==
=== Club ===
As of 1 July 2021

Appearances and goals by club, season and competition
Club	Season	League			National cup		League cup		Other		Total	
Club	Season	Division	Apps	Goals	Apps	Goals	Apps	Goals	Apps	Goals	Apps	Goals
Rennes	2006–07	Ligue 1	2	0	1	0	0	0	0	0	3	0
Rennes	2007–08	Ligue 1	0	0	0	0	1	0	0	0	1	0
Rennes	2008–09	Ligue 1	0	0	0	0	0	0	0	0	0	0
Rennes	2009–10	Ligue 1	0	0	0	0	0	0	0	0	0	0
Rennes	Total		2	0	1	0	1	0	0	0	4	0
Châteauroux (loan)	2007–08	Ligue 2	10	0	0	0	0	0	0	0	10	0
Clermont (loan)	2008–09	Ligue 2	25	2	1	0	0	0	0	0	26	2
Dijon	2009–10	Ligue 2	14	2	0	0	0	0	0	0	14	2
Dijon	2010–11	Ligue 2	11	0	1	0	1	0	0	0	13	0
Dijon	Total		25	2	1	0	1	0	0	0	27	2
Boulogne	2010–11	Ligue 2	9	0	0	0	0	0	0	0	9	0
Boulogne	2011–12	Ligue 2	19	3	2	0	0	0	0	0	21	3
Boulogne	Total		28	3	2	0	0	0	0	0	30	3
Istres	2012–13	Ligue 2	31	2	3	0	0	0	0	0	34	2
Levski Sofia	2013–14	A Group	20	1	4	0	0	0	2 (Note: Appearances in UEFA Europa League)	0	26	1
Ipswich Town	2014–15	EFL Championship	31	1	2	0	1	0	2 (Note: Appearances in Championship play-offs)	0	36	1
Ipswich Town	2015–16	EFL Championship	28	2	0	0	1	0	—		29	2
Ipswich Town	2016–17	EFL Championship	26	1	1	0	1	0	—		28	1
Ipswich Town	2017–18	EFL Championship	10	0	0	0	0	0	—		10	0
Ipswich Town	Total		95	4	3	0	3	0	2	0	103	4
Apollon Limassol	2018–19	Cypriot First Division	17	4	5	1	0	0	7	0	29	5
Dinamo București	2019–20	Liga I	8	0	1	0	0	0	0	0	9	0
Créteil	2020–21	Championnat National	13	1	2	0	—		—		15	1
Versailles	2021–22	Championnat National 2	1	0	0	0	—		—		1	0
Career total			265	19	23	1	5	0	11	0	304	20

=== International ===
As of match played 11 June 2024

Appearances and goals by national team and year
National team	Year	Apps	Goals
Mauritius	2011	1	0
Mauritius	2014	1	0
Mauritius	2015	3	0
Mauritius	2016	2	0
Mauritius	2017	6	0
Mauritius	2018	2	1
Mauritius	2019	4	0
Mauritius	2022	2	1
Mauritius	2023	5	0
Mauritius	2024	4	1
Total		30	3

As of match played 6 June 2024
Scores and results list Mauritius goal tally first, score column indicates score after each Bru goal.

List of international goals scored by Kévin Bru
No.	Date	Venue	Opponent	Score	Result	Competition
1	22 March 2018	Estádio Campo Desportivo, Taipa, Macau	Macau	1–0	1–0	Friendly
2	27 March 2022	Complexe Sportif de Côte d'Or, Saint Pierre, Mauritius	São Tomé and Príncipe	1–0	3–3	2023 Africa Cup of Nations qualification
3	6 June 2024	Martyrs of February Stadium, Benina, Libya	Libya	1–1	1–2	2026 FIFA World Cup qualification

== Honours ==
Versailles

- Championnat National 2: 2021–22

Individual

- Ipswich Town Goal of the Season: 2015–16
