= Tommy Smith (footballer, born 1990) =

New Zealand footballer

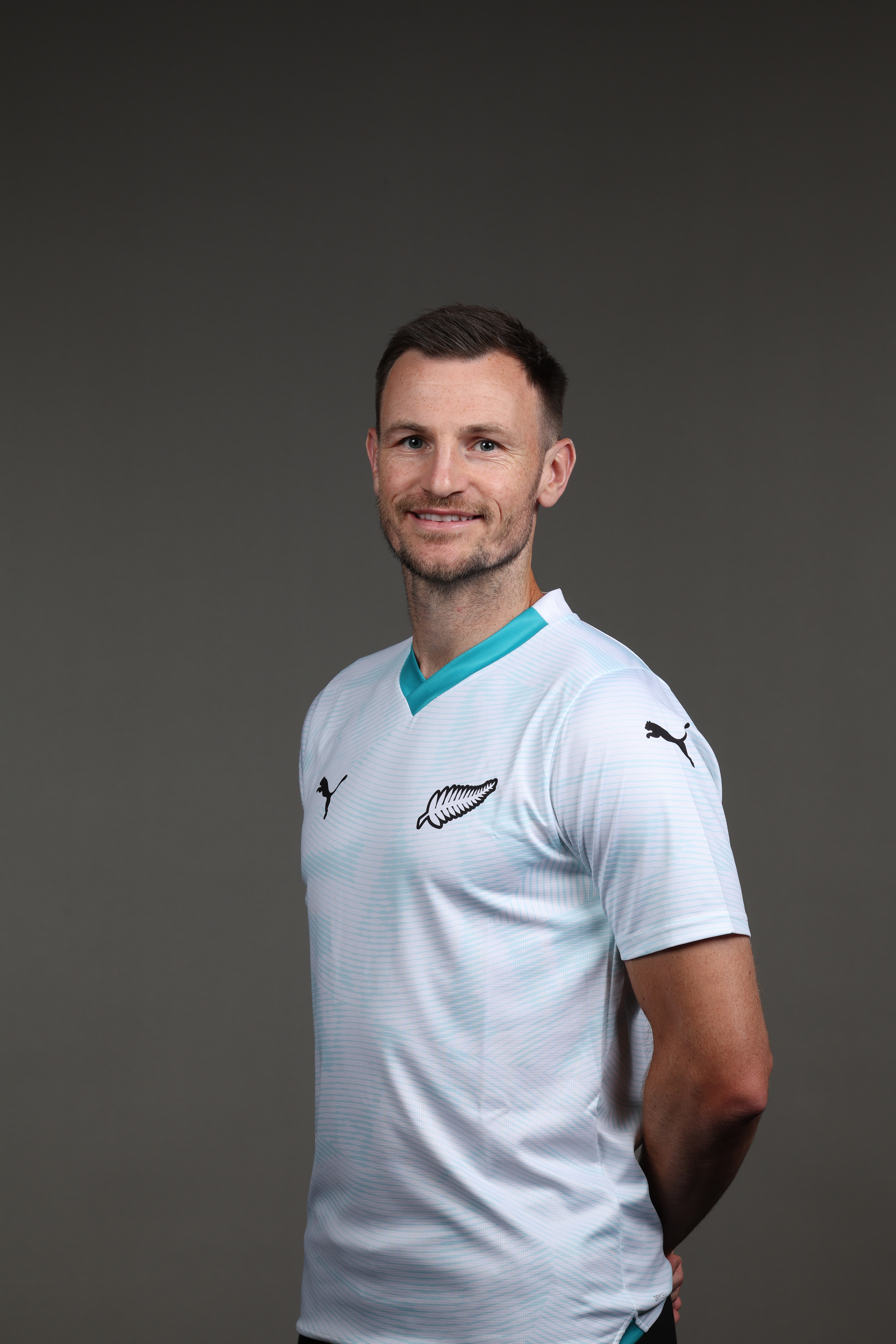
- Smith in 2024

Personal information
- Full name: Thomas Jefferson Smith
- Date of birth: 31 March 1990 (age 36)
- Place of birth: Macclesfield, England
- Height: 1.88 m (6 ft 2 in)
- Position: Centre-back

Team information
- Current team: Bury Town

Youth career
- Crewe Alexandra
- –2006: North Shore United
- 2006–2007: Ipswich Town

Senior career*
Years	Team	Apps	(Gls)
2007–2018	Ipswich Town	247	(21)
2008	→ Stevenage Borough (loan)	15	(0)
2010	→ Brentford (loan)	8	(0)
2011	→ Colchester United (loan)	6	(0)
2018–2019	Colorado Rapids	60	(7)
2020	Sunderland	0	(0)
2020–2023	Colchester United	88	(3)
2023–2024	Milton Keynes Dons	10	(0)
2024	Macarthur FC	8	(1)
2024–2025	Auckland FC	25	(0)
2025–2026	Braintree Town	14	(0)
2026–	Bury Town	10	(4)

International career^{‡}
2007	England U17	1	(0)
2008	England U18	3	(0)
2012	New Zealand U23	3	(0)
2010–2026	New Zealand	56	(2)
Medal record
Men's football
Representing New Zealand
OFC Nations Cup
Winner	2024 Fiji/Vanuatu
Third place	2012 Solomon Islands
- * Club domestic league appearances and goals as of 23 October 2026 ‡ National team caps and goals as of 20:04, 30 September 2024 (UTC)

Thomas Jefferson Smith (born 31 March 1990) is a professional footballer who plays as a defender for National League South club Bury Town. Born in England, he plays for the New Zealand national team.

A graduate of the Ipswich Town academy, he plays primarily as a centre back, but can also play as a left back. Smith spent 11 years at Ipswich, making over 240 appearances before leaving in January 2018 to join MLS side Colorado Rapids. He later joined Sunderland in February 2020 after being released by Colorado. Later in 2020, he signed for Colchester United.

== Club career ==
=== Ipswich Town ===
Born in Macclesfield, Cheshire, Smith is a product of the Ipswich Town academy. He won the club's Young Player of the Year award for the 2006–07 season. He signed a three-year professional contract in August 2007. He was on the shortlist for the 2008 Wickes Young Apprentice Trophy, given to the best youth player in the Championship, but Mark Beevers won the award.

==== Stevenage Borough (loan) ====
In February 2008, Smith joined Stevenage Borough in the Conference National on a one-month emergency loan. He made his debut for the club on 23 February in a 0–0 draw with Grays Athletic. Later the loan was extended until the end of the season. He played 15 games for the club before returning to Ipswich.

==== Return to Ipswich ====
Smith's form for Stevenage led to him getting his opportunity in the Ipswich first-team, he made his debut on 9 August 2008, in a 2–1 home loss to Preston North End at Portman Road.

That season, Smith broke his ankle in training, and missed the majority of the season. However, by the time he made his return to first team action, manager Jim Magilton had left the club and been replaced by Roy Keane. Smith featured heavily in Keane's early games as Ipswich manager, with the former Manchester United midfielder opting to give some of the club's younger talent – such as Connor Wickham and Smith – a chance to prove themselves.

However, injury stalled Smith's progress once again, when he suffered another training ground injury – this time to his hand. In his absence Gareth McAuley and Damien Delaney formed a solid defensive partnership ahead of deputizing goalkeeper Arran Lee-Barrett. Smith was unable to force his way back into the first team in the short-term.

==== Brentford (loan) ====
On 7 January 2010, Smith joined Brentford on a temporary basis. In doing so, Smith replaced Pim Balkestein at Griffin Park, who had been on loan at the club from Ipswich too. He made his debut on 16 January in a 3–1 win over Carlisle United. Smith played eight games during his brief spell at Brentford, before being recalled by Ipswich on 15 March.

==== Return to Ipswich ====
Smith scored his first professional goal for Ipswich away against Middlesbrough in the first game of the 2010–11 Championship season, which Ipswich won 3–1. He made 26 appearances over the course of the season, scoring 3 goals.

==== Colchester United (loan) ====
On 17 March 2011, Smith signed for Colchester United on loan for the rest of the 2010–11 season. He made his debut two days later in a 1–0 away loss to Tranmere Rovers. He made six appearances during his loan spell before returning to Ipswich.

==== Return to Ipswich ====
After an impressive 2011–12 season, in which he scored 3 goals in 28 appearances, Smith signed a two-year contract extension in May 2012.

He scored in his first appearance of the 2012–13 season in a 3–1 home win over Bristol Rovers at Portman Road in a League Cup first round tie, on 14 August. He established himself as a first-team starter over the course of the season, making 41 appearances in all competitions and scoring 4 goals. Smith's performances earned him the Ipswich Town Player of the Year award for the season.

Smith formed a strong defensive partnership with new signing Christophe Berra during the 2013–14 season. He scored his first goal of the season on 10 August, in a 3–0 home win over Millwall. He made 47 appearances during the season, scoring 6 goals, his highest goal return in a season to date.

He continued to feature as a first-team regular during the 2014–15 season as Ipswich finished 6th and qualified for the Championship play-offs. He played 46 games over the course of the season, scoring 5 goals, including scoring against Norwich City in an East Anglian Derby on 16 May 2015.

He scored his first goal of the 2015–16 season on 15 August, netting the winner in a 2–1 home win over Sheffield Wednesday at Portman Road. He scored his second goal of the season on 15 September, scoring the winning goal in a 0–1 away win over Leeds United at Elland Road. He made a total of 48 appearances during the season, scoring 2 goals.

Injury hampered Smith's 2016–17 season, on 16 September he was ruled out for 12 weeks due to a back injury. He continued to suffer with injury over the course of the season, making just 11 appearances during the campaign.

He continued to suffer injury problems during the 2017–18 season, he made his first appearance of the season on the opening day 1–0 win over Birmingham City, but only made a further two appearances between August and January. On 6 January 2018 it was reported that Smith was close to joining Major League Soccer side Colorado Rapids.

=== Colorado Rapids ===
On 22 January 2018, Smith signed with Colorado Rapids. He made his debut for the club on 21 February, in a 2–0 loss to Toronto FC in a CONCACAF Champions League tie. He scored his first goal for the club on 14 June 2018 in a 2–2 draw with Chicago Fire. During a match against Minnesota United on 13 October 2018, he partially provoked a brawl after the team scored their second goal. He was red carded as a result. He made 36 appearances during his first season at the club, scoring 4 goals, including late winners over Minnesota United and Dallas.

He scored in the opening game of the 2019 season in a 2–1 loss to Dallas. He went on to make a total of 28 appearances over the course of the season, netting 3 goals.

On 22 November 2019, it was announced that Smith's contract would not be extended and he left the club. Following his release from Colorado, Smith returned to England and began training with former club Ipswich, leading to speculation of a return to the club. However, manager Paul Lambert ruled out this possibility.

=== Sunderland ===
On 21 February 2020, Smith joined League One club Sunderland on a contract until the end of the season. With the suspension of the 2019–20 season due to the COVID-19 pandemic, he did not make an appearance for the club. He left Sunderland at the end of the season following the end of his short-term contract.

=== Colchester United ===
On 25 August 2020, Smith joined League Two side Colchester United on a two-year deal. He had previously appeared for Colchester on loan from Ipswich during the 2010–11 season and had featured in a number of Colchester's 2020–21 pre-season friendlies. He made his second debut for the club on 5 September 2020 in Colchester's 3–1 EFL Cup defeat to Reading. He scored his first goal for the club in their 2–1 win over Grimsby Town on 5 December 2020. On 5 July 2021, Smith signed a two-year contract extension with the club. He was named club captain ahead of the 2021–22 season.

=== Milton Keynes Dons ===
On 28 July 2023, Smith joined League Two club Milton Keynes Dons on a free transfer following a successful trial period with the club in pre-season. He made his debut for the club in the opening game of the 2023–24 season on 5 August 2023, in a 5–3 away win over Wrexham. On 6 February 2024, Smith's contract was terminated by mutual consent.

=== Macarthur FC ===
On 6 February 2024, Smith signed for Macarthur FC, making the move to Australia to play in the A-League. Joining mid-way through the season, Smith signed to the end of the active 2023–24 season.

=== Auckland FC ===
Smith joined Auckland FC ahead of their debut A-League Men season.

He was appointed vice-captain as part of the club’s leadership group under captain Hiroki Sakai.

During the 2024–25 season, Auckland FC secured the A-League Men premiers plate, marking the first piece of club silverware of Smith’s career.

On 17 July 2025, the club announced that Smith had departed Auckland FC to return to England with his family.

=== Braintree Town ===
On 2 August 2025, Smith returned to England, joining National League club Braintree Town.

== International career ==
Born in England, Smith resided in New Zealand during his youth and as a result holds dual nationality. This gave him the opportunity to declare himself eligible for the New Zealand national football team ("All Whites"), though he has also represented England at U-17 and U-18 level. Smith played in the 2007 FIFA U-17 World Cup in Korea during September 2007 despite not playing a part in England's qualification for the tournament.

In December 2009, after the New Zealand national football team had qualified for the 2010 FIFA World Cup, Smith declared that he wanted to play for New Zealand and made himself available for All Whites selection, having been offered the opportunity by the Kiwi's boss, Ricki Herbert. He made his full international debut on 3 March 2010, starting in a 2–0 friendly defeat to Mexico in Los Angeles, USA on 3 March 2010. Smith was named in New Zealand's final 23-man squad to compete at the 2010 FIFA World Cup and made his first World Cup Finals appearance in New Zealand's opening game, a 1–1 draw against Slovakia. He also went on play every minute of New Zealand's World Cup campaign, which achieved a historic three points at the tournament.

Smith became the youngest captain in All Whites history after leading the team in a 2–2 draw versus El Salvador on 23 May 2012. On 2 June 2012, Smith scored his first goal for his country in 1–0 win versus Fiji in a 2014 FIFA World Cup Qualifier. He represented New Zealand at the 2012 Summer Olympics, playing in all three of New Zealand's games. In May 2016, coach Anthony Hudson suggested Smith would not be called up for the national team in the future, citing a perceived lack of commitment.

Smith returned to the All Whites squad for the 2026 World Cup.

== Career statistics ==
=== Club ===
As of 23 October 2026

Appearances and goals by club, season and competition
Club	Season	League			Cup (Note: Includes the FA Cup and U.S. Open Cup)		League Cup (Note: Includes the EFL Cup and National League Cup)		Other		Total	
Club	Season	Division	Apps	Goals	Apps	Goals	Apps	Goals	Apps	Goals	Apps	Goals
Ipswich Town	2007–08	Championship	0	0	0	0	0	0	―		0	0
Ipswich Town	2008–09	Championship	2	0	0	0	0	0	―		2	0
Ipswich Town	2009–10	Championship	14	0	0	0	1	0	―		15	0
Ipswich Town	2010–11	Championship	22	3	0	0	4	0	―		26	3
Ipswich Town	2011–12	Championship	26	3	1	0	1	0	―		28	3
Ipswich Town	2012–13	Championship	38	3	1	0	2	1	―		41	4
Ipswich Town	2013–14	Championship	45	6	1	0	1	0	―		47	6
Ipswich Town	2014–15	Championship	42	4	2	0	0	0	2 (Note: Appearances in the Championship play-offs)	1	46	5
Ipswich Town	2015–16	Championship	45	2	1	0	2	0	―		48	2
Ipswich Town	2016–17	Championship	10	0	0	0	1	0	―		11	0
Ipswich Town	2017–18	Championship	3	0	0	0	0	0	―		3	0
Ipswich Town	Total		247	21	6	0	12	1	2	1	267	23
Stevenage Borough (loan)	2007–08	Conference Premier	15	0	―		―		―		15	0
Brentford (loan)	2009–10	League One	8	0	―		―		―		8	0
Colchester United (loan)	2010–11	League One	6	0	―		―		―		6	0
Colorado Rapids	2018	Major League Soccer	33	4	1	0	―		2 (Note: Appearances in CONCACAF Champions League)	0	36	4
Colorado Rapids	2019	Major League Soccer	27	3	1	0	―		―		28	3
Colorado Rapids	Total		60	7	2	0	0	0	2	0	64	7
Sunderland	2019–20	League One	0	0	―		―		―		0	0
Colchester United	2020–21	League Two	45	2	1	0	1	0	0	0	47	2
Colchester United	2021–22	League Two	32	1	1	0	1	0	2 (Note: Appearance(s) in EFL Trophy)	0	36	1
Colchester United	2022–23	League Two	11	0	0	0	0	0	1	0	11	0
Colchester United	Total		88	3	2	0	2	0	3	0	95	3
Milton Keynes Dons	2023–24	League Two	10	0	1	0	0	0	1	0	12	0
Macarthur	2023–24	A-League Men	7	1	0	0	—		2 (Note: One appearance in AFC Cup; one appearances in A-League Men finals series)	0	9	1
Auckland FC	2024–25	A-League Men	22	0	—		—		1 (Note: Appearances in A-League Men finals series)	0	23	0
Braintree Town	2025–26	National League	14	0	1	0	3	0	0	0	18	0
Bury Town	2026–27	SFL Premier Division Central	10	4	2	0	—		0	0	12	4
Career total			462	32	12	0	17	1	11	1	498	31

=== International ===
As of match played 7 September 2024

Appearances and goals by national team and year
National team	Year	Apps	Goals
New Zealand	2010	7	0
New Zealand	2011	1	0
New Zealand	2012	13	1
New Zealand	2013	6	1
New Zealand	2014	2	0
New Zealand	2015	0	0
New Zealand	2016	0	0
New Zealand	2017	7	0
New Zealand	2018	0	0
New Zealand	2019	2	0
New Zealand	2020	0	0
New Zealand	2021	3	0
New Zealand	2022	8	0
New Zealand	2023	2	0
New Zealand	2024	5	0
Total		56	2

As of match played 22 March 2013
Scores and results list New Zealand's goal tally first, score column indicates score after each Smith goal.

List of international goals scored by Tommy Smith
No.	Date	Venue	Opponent	Score	Result	Competition
1	2 June 2012	Lawson Tama Stadium, Honiara, Solomon Islands	Fiji	1–0	1–0	2012 OFC Nations Cup
2	22 March 2013	Forsyth Barr Stadium, Dunedin, New Zealand	New Caledonia	2–1	2–1	2014 FIFA World Cup qualification

== Honours ==
Auckland FC

- A-League Premiership: 2024-25

New Zealand

- OFC Nations Cup: 2024

Individual

- Ipswich Town Young Player of the Year: 2006–07
- Ipswich Town Player of the Year: 2012–13
- IFFHS OFC Men's Team of the Decade 2011–2020
- IFFHS Oceania Men's Team of All Time: 2021

== See also ==
- List of New Zealand international footballers
