= Daryl Murphy =

Irish footballer (born 1983)

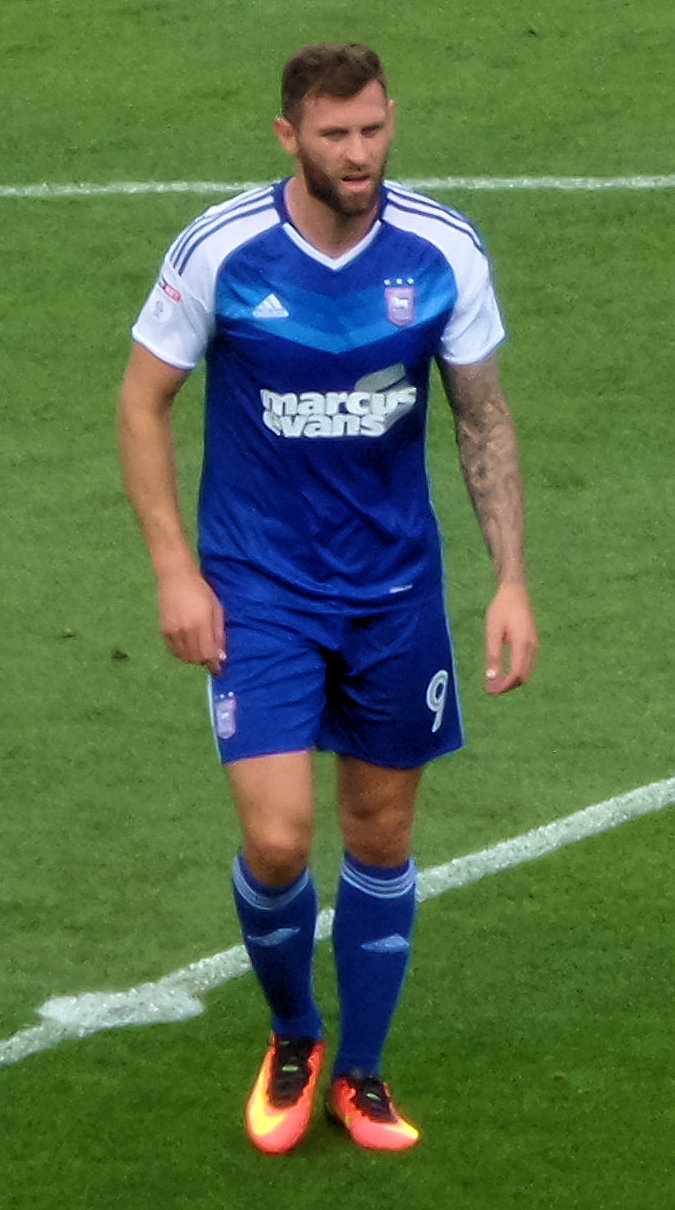
- Murphy playing for Ipswich Town in 2016

Personal information
- Full name: Daryl Michael Murphy
- Date of birth: 15 March 1983 (age 43)
- Place of birth: Waterford, Ireland
- Height: 1.91 m (6 ft 3 in)
- Position: Striker

Youth career
- –2000: Southend United
- 2000–2001: Luton Town

Senior career*
Years	Team	Apps	(Gls)
2001–2002	Luton Town	0	(0)
2001-2002	→ Harrow Borough (loan)	3	(0)
2002–2005	Waterford United	75+	(29)
2005–2010	Sunderland	110	(14)
2005–2006	→ Sheffield Wednesday (loan)	4	(0)
2009-2010	→ Ipswich Town (loan)	18	(6)
2010–2013	Celtic	19	(3)
2011–2012	→ Ipswich Town (loan)	33	(4)
2012–2013	→ Ipswich Town (loan)	39	(7)
2013–2016	Ipswich Town	127	(50)
2016–2017	Newcastle United	15	(5)
2017–2019	Nottingham Forest	55	(11)
2019–2020	Bolton Wanderers	24	(8)
2020–2021	Waterford	9	(0)
Total		456+	(137)

International career
2004–2005	Republic of Ireland U21	9	(3)
2007–2017	Republic of Ireland	32	(3)
- * Club domestic league appearances and goals

Daryl Michael Murphy (born 15 March 1983) is an Irish former professional footballer who played as a striker.

Murphy began his career at Waterford United, having previously played youth football for Waterford-based side Southend United and English side Luton Town, whilst also spending a brief spell on loan at Harrow Borough in 2002. After a three-year spell at Waterford he signed for Sunderland in 2005. Murphy went on to make over 100 appearances for Sunderland, whilst also spending time out on loan with Sheffield Wednesday and Ipswich Town, before joining Scottish side Celtic in 2010. He spent much of his time at Celtic on loan at former loan club Ipswich Town, where he spent two consecutive season on loan before making the move permanent in June 2013. He spent the following three seasons at Portman Road, making over 200 appearances and scoring over 60 goals before moving to Newcastle United in 2016. He spent one season at Newcastle before leaving to join Nottingham Forest. He made 60 appearances over two seasons at Forest before joining Bolton Wanderers in 2019. He returned to Waterford in August 2020.

Murphy made his debut for the Republic of Ireland in 2007, and went on to make over 30 appearances for his country, including representing Ireland at the UEFA Euro 2016. He announced his retirement from international football in January 2018.

== Club career ==
=== Early career ===
Murphy was born in Waterford, County Waterford. He played youth football for local side Southend United before joining English club Luton Town on 14 November 2000. He spent a brief spell on loan at Harrow Borough in 2002. He was released on 18 April 2002 before signing for hometown club Waterford United. He scored his first League of Ireland goal in a 3–1 away win over rivals Kilkenny City on 19 September. He scored eight league goals in that last "winter" season as the Blues won the League of Ireland First Division title. In the 2004 season, he notched 14 league goals in the Premier Division which earned him the PFAI Young Player of the Year award.

=== Sunderland ===
In May 2005, Murphy signed a two-year contract with Premier League side Sunderland. He made his Premier League debut in a 1–1 home draw with West Ham United at the Stadium of Light on 1 October 2005. Murphy had a one-month loan spell at Sheffield Wednesday during the 2005–06 season, making 4 appearances before being recalled by Sunderland. On 12 February 2006, he scored his first Premier League goal after coming off the bench at home to Tottenham Hotspur, equalising with minutes to go.

In the 2006–07 season, Murphy scored 10 goals in the Championship despite being used sparingly for the early weeks. He netted one goal each on the opening day of the season against Coventry City and on 12 August against Plymouth Argyle though both matches were lost. Murphy scored his third goal of the season in the Black Cats' 2–1 away win over Queens Park Rangers on 28 November, and then notched in successive games against Norwich City and Luton Town. On the final day of the season, he scored two goals against Luton Town in a 5–0 away win, while also setting up Anthony Stokes for his goal.

Murphy scored in a pre-season friendly against Juventus in August 2007. He made his first appearance of the 2007–08 season in Sunderland's opening day victory over Tottenham Hotspur. He scored his first goal of the season on 29 December in a 3–1 win over Bolton Wanderers. His third goal of the 2007–08 season came against Wigan Athletic on 9 February 2008 at The Stadium of Light, with the goal later being chosen by Match of the Day pundits as the Goal of the Month for February. On 26 April 2008, Murphy came on as a substitute and scored the winning goal in a 3–2 victory over local rivals Middlesbrough, securing Sunderland's status in the Premier League for the following season. He made 28 appearances during the 2007–08 season, scoring 3 goals.

==== Ipswich Town (loan) ====
On 1 February 2010, Murphy signed for Ipswich Town on loan for the remainder of the 2009–10 season, once again joining up with Roy Keane, his former manager at Sunderland. He marked his first appearance against Middlesbrough with a goal after 23 seconds. He then scored the crucial second goal at Queens Park Rangers on 9 February, and another in his third appearance against Peterborough, making his record 3 in 3 for Ipswich. Murphy continued his scoring form for Ipswich by scoring a brace against Cardiff City on 9 March 2010, handing the Tractor Boys three points. Murphy made 18 appearances during his loan spell at Portman Road, scoring 6 goals.

=== Celtic ===
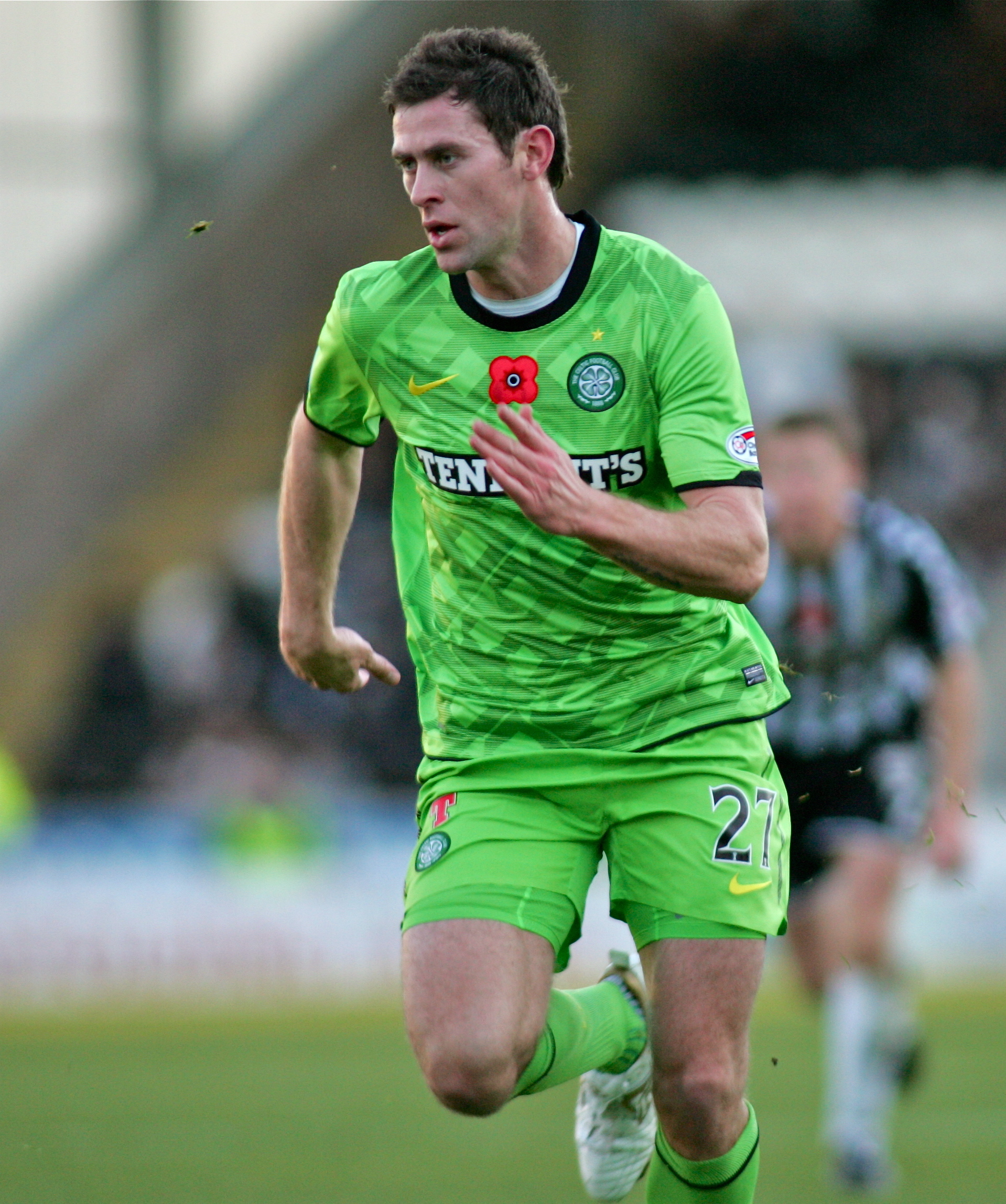
Murphy playing for Celtic in 2010

On 16 July 2010, Celtic signed Murphy on a three-year contract for £1 million. He made his debut the following week in a friendly against Lincoln City, scoring his first goal for the club in a 4–1 win. He scored his second pre-season goal against Arsenal in the Emirates Cup on 1 August. Murphy made his competitive debut for the club on 28 July 2010, coming on as a second-half substitute in a 3–0 away defeat to Braga in a third-round UEFA Champions League qualifying match. He came off the bench to make his Scottish Premier League debut in a 4–0 victory over St Mirren on 22 August 2010. The following week, Murphy scored his first goal for Celtic, netting the match-winner from the penalty spot in a 1–0 victory over Motherwell on 29 August. He scored his second goal for the club again from the penalty spot away to Kilmarnock on 19 September, helping the team to a 2–1 away win. On 1 May 2011, Murphy scored his first goal at Celtic Park in a 4–1 victory against Dundee United. He made 21 appearances during his first season at Celtic, scoring 3 goals.

=== Return to Ipswich Town ===
Murphy returned to Ipswich on a season-long loan on 25 August 2011. He made his first appearance of the season on 27 August, starting in a 2–1 home win over Leeds United at Portman Road. He scored his first goal of the season in a 2–3 loss to Reading on 26 November. He made 34 appearances during his second loan spell with the club, scoring 4 goals.

On 30 August 2012, Murphy signed for Ipswich Town on a season-long loan. He made his first appearance following his return to the club on 1 September, in a 2–2 draw with Huddersfield Town. He scored his first goal of the season on 2 October, netting in a 1–1 draw with Brighton & Hove Albion. He went on to make 40 appearances in all competitions over the course of the 2012–13 season, scoring 7 goals, before returning to Celtic at the end of the season.

On 7 June 2013, Murphy agreed a two-year deal with Ipswich, finally making his move permanent after several loan spells with the club. He made his first appearance for the club following his permanent move to Suffolk on 3 August, in a 2–1 away loss to Reading. His first goal of the season came on 17 September 2013, netting in a 2–1 win over Yeovil Town. Murphy formed a strong partnership with fellow new signing David McGoldrick, the duo netting 29 goals between them during the season, with Murphy scoring 13 of those.

Murphy went into the 2014–15 season continuing his good form, scoring on the opening day of the season in a 2–1 home win against Fulham. On 17 September 2014, Murphy netted a wonder goal against Brighton & Hove Albion; Tyrone Mings played a long ball to Murphy which he struck on the volley from the left edge of the 18-yard box. He scored 6 goals during December, including braces in victories over Leeds United and Brentford, with his impressive form earning him the Football League Championship Player of the Month award for December. On 14 February 2015, he scored a brace in a 2–1 away win over Fulham at Craven Cottage, bringing his goal tally to 21 in the league. Thus, Murphy became the first Ipswich player since Darren Bent in the 2004–05 season to score 20 league goals in a season. He finished the 2014–15 season as the top scorer in the Championship with 27 league goals as Ipswich finished 6th and qualified for the Championship play-offs, while also earning a place in the 2014–15 Championship PFA Team of the Year and being named Ipswich's Player of the Year and Players' Player of the Year.

On 15 July 2015, it was announced that Murphy had signed a two-year contract extension with the club. After a comparatively slow start to the 2015–16 season in which he failed to score in his first 13 appearances of the league campaign, Murphy ended his drought by netting his first hat-trick in English football in a 2–5 away victory over Rotherham United on 7 November 2015. He went on to score 6 goals during November, earning him another Championship Player of the Month award. He made 35 appearances during the season, scoring 10 goals.

=== Newcastle United ===
On 28 August 2016, Murphy signed for Championship club Newcastle United on a two-year contract for an undisclosed fee. A calf injury prevented Murphy from making his debut for the club until 1 January 2017. He scored his first goal for Newcastle in an FA Cup tie with Birmingham City on 7 January. He then scored in the next two matches for Newcastle, in wins against Brentford and Rotherham United. In March, he also scored in matches against Huddersfield Town and Fulham. On 17 April, he scored an equalising goal in a 3–1 loss against his former club, Ipswich Town. He scored 6 goals in 18 appearances as Newcastle won the Championship title and promotion to the Premier League.

In an interview with the Shields Gazette, Murphy said that although it was expected he would leave the club, he knew he was brought in to do a specific job, and praised Rafael Benítez for his man-management skills.

=== Nottingham Forest ===
On 21 July 2017, Murphy joined Nottingham Forest on a three-year deal for an undisclosed fee. He made his debut on the opening day of the 2017–18 season in a 1–0 home win over Millwall at the City Ground. He scored his first goal for Forest in a 4–3 win at Brentford on 12 August 2017. He netted 7 goals in 28 appearances during his first season at the City Ground.

Murphy scored on the opening day of the 2018–19 season, scoring the equalising goal in a 1–1 draw with Bristol City at Ashton Gate. He scored 4 goals in his first 6 appearances of the season, including scoring the opening goal after 2 minutes in a 3–1 EFL Cup victory over former club Newcastle United. He made 32 appearances in all competitions during the 2018–19 season, scoring 6 goals.

In late 2018, Murphy was banned for six weeks for failing a drugs test, testing positive for cocaine.

On 2 September 2019, Nottingham Forest and Murphy mutually agreed to terminate his contract, allowing him to become a free agent.

=== Bolton Wanderers ===
On 2 September 2019, Murphy joined Bolton Wanderers on a contract until the end of the season, following his release from Nottingham Forest and made his debut in a 1–0 defeat at Portsmouth on 28 September. He scored his first goal for the club on in a 2–0 away win over Bristol Rovers, helping Bolton to their first win of the season. He then scored in Bolton's next four league games, a 2–1 win against Fleetwood Town, a 1–0 win against MK Dons, a 7–1 defeat against Accrington Stanley, and a 2–2 draw against AFC Wimbledon. On 26 June it was announced Murphy would be one of 14 senior players released at the end of his contract on 30 June.

=== Return to Waterford ===
On 4 September 2020, Murphy rejoined home town team Waterford.

== International career ==
Having previously represented the Republic of Ireland at under-23 level, Murphy won his first call-up to the senior Republic of Ireland national team in 2006 due to the absence of Robbie Keane through injury, but only featured as an unused substitute. He made his senior debut against Ecuador at the Giants Stadium on 24 May 2007. He made his first competitive appearance as a second-half substitute in a Euro 2008 qualifier away to Slovakia in September 2008.

He did not receive another call up until 2014, when Ireland manager Martin O'Neill called him up for a friendly against Serbia on 5 March 2014. He was included in the Republic of Ireland squad for the UEFA Euro 2016 tournament, featuring in the 1–0 group stage victory over Italy, while also starting in the 2–1 knockout stage defeat to France on 26 June 2016.

He scored his first goal for the Republic of Ireland in his 23rd appearance, netting in a 2–2 draw away to Serbia in a 2018 World Cup Qualifier on 5 September 2016. On 6 October 2017, Murphy scored a brace in a 2–0 victory over Moldova in a 2018 FIFA World Cup qualification match at the Aviva Stadium in Dublin.

In January 2018, Murphy announced his retirement from international football.

== Career statistics ==
=== Club ===
As of match played 16 April 2021

Appearances and goals by club, season and competition
Club	Season	League			National cup		League cup		Other		Total	
Club	Season	Division	Apps	Goals	Apps	Goals	Apps	Goals	Apps	Goals	Apps	Goals
Luton Town	2001–02	Third Division	0	0	0	0	0	0	0	0	0	0
Harrow Borough (loan)	2001–02	Isthmian League Premier Division	3	0	0	0	—		0	0	3	0
Waterford	2002–03	League of Ireland First Division		8						2		10
Waterford	2003	League of Ireland Premier Division	34	7	2	0	1	0	—		37	9
Waterford	2004	League of Ireland Premier Division	35	13	6	8			—		41	21
Waterford	2005	League of Ireland Premier Division	6	1	1	0			—		7	1
Waterford	Total		75+	29	9	8+	1	0		2+	85+	39+
Sunderland	2005–06	Premier League	18	1	1	0	1	0	—		20	1
Sunderland	2006–07	Championship	38	10	1	0	1	0	—		40	10
Sunderland	2007–08	Premier League	28	3	1	0	1	0	—		30	3
Sunderland	2008–09	Premier League	23	0	1	0	3	0	—		27	0
Sunderland	2009–10	Premier League	3	0	1	0	3	0	—		7	0
Sunderland	Total		110	14	5	0	9	0	0	0	124	14
Sheffield Wednesday (loan)	2005–06	Championship	4	0	0	0	0	0	—		4	0
Ipswich Town (loan)	2009–10	Championship	18	6	0	0	0	0	—		18	6
Celtic	2010–11	Scottish Premier League	18	3	0	0	1	0	2 (Note: Appearance(s) in UEFA Champions League)	0	21	3
Celtic	2011–12	Scottish Premier League	0	0	0	0	0	0	0	0	0	0
Celtic	2012–13	Scottish Premier League	1	0	0	0	0	0	1	0	2	0
Celtic	Total		19	3	0	0	1	0	3	0	23	3
Ipswich Town (loan)	2011–12	Championship	33	4	1	0	0	0	—		34	4
Ipswich Town (loan)	2012–13	Championship	39	7	1	0	0	0	—		40	7
Ipswich Town (loan)	Total		72	11	2	0	0	0	0	0	74	11
Ipswich Town	2013–14	Championship	45	13	0	0	1	0	—		46	13
Ipswich Town	2014–15	Championship	44	27	2	0	0	0	2 (Note: Appearances in Championship play-offs)	0	48	27
Ipswich Town	2015–16	Championship	34	10	0	0	1	0	—		35	10
Ipswich Town	2016–17	Championship	4	0	0	0	0	0	—		4	0
Ipswich Town	Total		127	50	2	0	2	0	2	0	133	50
Newcastle United	2016–17	Championship	15	5	1	1	2	0	—		18	6
Nottingham Forest	2017–18	Championship	27	7	0	0	1	0	—		28	7
Nottingham Forest	2018–19	Championship	28	4	1	0	3	2	—		32	6
Nottingham Forest	Total		55	11	1	0	4	2	0	0	60	13
Bolton Wanderers	2019–20	League One	24	8	1	0	0	0	1 (Note: Appearance in EFL Trophy)	0	26	8
Waterford	2020	League of Ireland Premier Division	4	0	0	0	—		—		4	0
Waterford	2021	League of Ireland Premier Division	5	0	0	0	—		0	0	5	0
Waterford	Total		9	0	0	0	—		0	0	9	0
Career total			456	137	21	9	19	2	6	2	502	152

=== International ===
As of match played 14 November 2017

Appearances and goals by national team and year
National team	Year	Apps	Goals
Republic of Ireland	2007	5	0
Republic of Ireland	2008	3	0
Republic of Ireland	2014	5	0
Republic of Ireland	2015	5	0
Republic of Ireland	2016	5	1
Republic of Ireland	2017	9	2
Total		32	3

As of match played 6 October 2017

Republic of Ireland score listed first, score column indicates score after each Murphy goal.

International goals by date, venue, cap, opponent, score, result and competition
No.	Date	Venue	Cap	Opponent	Score	Result	Competition	Ref
1	5 September 2016	Red Star Stadium, Belgrade, Serbia	23	Serbia	2–2	2–2	2018 FIFA World Cup qualification	
2	6 October 2017	Aviva Stadium, Dublin, Ireland	27	Moldova	1–0	2–0	2018 FIFA World Cup qualification	
3	6 October 2017	Aviva Stadium, Dublin, Ireland	27	Moldova	2–0	2–0	2018 FIFA World Cup qualification	

== Honours ==
Waterford United

- League of Ireland First Division: 2002–03

Sunderland

- Football League Championship: 2006–07

Newcastle United

- EFL Championship: 2016–17

Individual

- PFAI Young Player of the Year: 2004
- Football League Championship Player of the Month: December 2014, November 2015
- Football League Championship Golden Boot: 2014–15
- PFA Team of the Year: 2014–15 Championship
- Ipswich Town Player of the Year: 2014–15
- Ipswich Town Players' Player of the Year: 2014–15
