= Larsen Touré =

Guinean footballer (born 1984)

Personal information
- Date of birth: 20 July 1984 (age 42)
- Place of birth: Brest, France
- Height: 1.83 m (6 ft 0 in)
- Positions: Winger; forward

Team information
- Current team: Schiltigheim
- Number: 33

Youth career
- Lille

Senior career*
Years	Team	Apps	(Gls)
2005–2010	Lille	27	(1)
2006–2007	→ Gueugnon (loan)	28	(5)
2008	→ Grenoble (loan)	14	(3)
2009	→ Grenoble (loan)	14	(1)
2010–2013	Brest	52	(7)
2013–2014	Levski Sofia	14	(4)
2014–2015	Arles-Avignon	24	(5)
2015–2016	Ipswich Town	7	(0)
2017–2018	US Choisy au Bac		
2018	Engordany	4	(0)
2019–2021	Schiltigheim	7	(0)

International career^{‡}
2008–2013	Guinea	7	(0)
- * Club domestic league appearances and goals as of 15:48, 23 November 2020 (UTC) ‡ National team caps and goals as of 21:07, 22 November 2020 (UTC)

Larsen Touré (born 20 July 1984) is a former professional footballer who played as a winger or forward for SC Schiltigheim. Born in France, he represented the Guinea national team at international level.

== Club career ==
Touré was born in Brest, France. After playing several seasons with Lille OSC, he returned to his hometown club Stade Brestois 29 in summer 2010 where he gained a starting spot.

In September 2013 he signed a two-year contract with Bulgarian side Levski Sofia, and made 23 appearances for the club, scoring four times. He was released at the end of his contract.

On 1 August 2015, Touré signed for Ipswich Town after spending his pre-season on trial there and making appearances in a number of friendlies. Touré made his debut on 11 August 2015 against Stevenage. He received a knock in the first half, requiring the physio to come on. He finished the first half, but was taken off at half time. Touré left Ipswich Town at the end of his one-year contract.

In November 2017, Touré signed for French lower-league side US Choisy au Bac.

== International career ==
Touré made his debut for Guinea in a friendly against Ivory Coast on 20 August 2008. Between 2008 and 2013, he made seven appearances for the Guinea national team.

== Career statistics ==
As of match played 24 October 2020

Appearances and goals by club, season and competition
Club	Season	League			National Cup		League Cup		Other		Total	
Club	Season	Division	Apps	Goals	Apps	Goals	Apps	Goals	Apps	Goals	Apps	Goals
Lille	2005–06	Ligue 1	2	0	1	0	0	0	0	0	3	0
Lille	2006–07	Ligue 1	0	0	0	0	0	0	0	0	0	0
Lille	2007–08	Ligue 1	9	0	0	0	1	0	—		10	0
Lille	2008–09	Ligue 1	3	0	0	0	0	0	—		3	0
Lille	2009–10	Ligue 1	13	1	1	0	2	0	7 (Note: Appearances in UEFA Europa League)	0	23	1
Lille	Total		27	1	2	0	3	0	7	0	39	1
Gueugnon (loan)	2006–07	Ligue 2	28	5	1	0	1	0	—		30	5
Grenoble (loan)	2007–08	Ligue 2	14	3	0	0	0	0	—		14	3
Grenoble (loan)	2008–09	Ligue 1	14	1	5	1	1	0	—		20	2
Grenoble (loan)	Total		28	4	5	1	1	0	0	0	34	5
Brest	2010–11	Ligue 1	22	4	1	0	1	0	—		24	4
Brest	2011–12	Ligue 1	11	1	1	0	0	0	—		12	1
Brest	2012–13	Ligue 1	19	2	1	0	1	0	—		21	2
Brest	Total		52	7	3	0	2	0	0	0	57	7
Levski Sofia	2013–14	Bulgarian First League	14	4	4	0	0	0	4	0	22	4
Arles-Avignon	2014–15	Ligue 2	24	5	1	0	3	0	—		28	5
Ipswich Town	2015–16	Championship	7	0	1	0	3	0	—		11	0
Engordany	2018–19	Primera Divisió	4	0	0	0	0	0	3	0	7	0
Schiltigheim	2019–20	Championnat National	3	0	0	0	0	0	—		3	0
Schiltigheim	2020–21	Championnat National	4	0	0	0	0	0	—		4	0
Schiltigheim	Total		7	0	0	0	0	0	0	0	7	0
Career total			191	26	17	1	13	0	14	0	235	27

=== International ===
As of match played 5 February 2013

Appearances and goals by national team and year
National team	Year	Apps	Goals
Guinea
Guinea	2008	3	0
Guinea	2009	1	0
Guinea	2011	2	0
Guinea	2013	1	0
Total		7	0
