= Piotr Malarczyk =

Polish footballer (born 1991)

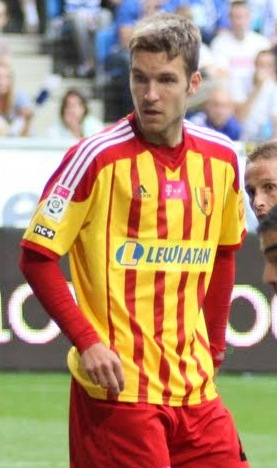
- Malarczyk playing for Korona Kielce in 2013

Personal information
- Full name: Piotr Kamil Malarczyk
- Date of birth: 1 August 1991 (age 35)
- Place of birth: Kielce, Poland
- Height: 1.89 m (6 ft 2 in)
- Position: Centre-back

Team information
- Current team: Korona Kielce (assistant coach)

Youth career
- 2001–2008: Korona Kielce

Senior career*
Years	Team	Apps	(Gls)
2008–2009	Korona Kielce II	14	(2)
2009–2015	Korona Kielce	125	(8)
2015–2016	Ipswich Town	3	(0)
2016	→ Southend United (loan)	2	(0)
2016–2018	Cracovia	36	(1)
2018–2019	Korona Kielce	23	(0)
2018–2019	Korona Kielce II	9	(2)
2019–2021	Piast Gliwice	25	(2)
2021–2025	Korona Kielce	73	(4)
2022	Korona Kielce II	1	(0)
Total		311	(19)

International career
2009–2010	Poland U19	3	(0)
2010–2011	Poland U20	5	(0)
2011–2012	Poland U21	8	(0)
- * Club domestic league appearances and goals

Piotr Kamil Malarczyk (born 1 August 1991) is a Polish former professional footballer who played as a centre-back.

Malarczyk began his career with Polish club Korona Kielce. After coming through the club’s youth system, he went on to make over 100 appearances for the Korona senior team. In 2015 he moved to English club Ipswich Town, where he spent a single season, including a short loan at Southend United, before returning to Poland to join Cracovia. He spent two years at Cracovia before returning to Korona Kielce in 2018. In 2019, Malarczyk joined Piast Gliwice.

He has won caps for Poland at U19, U20 and U21 levels.

== Club career ==
Malarczyk made his debut for Korona in a 3–2 defeat to Wisła Kraków on 30 October 2009.

Malarczyk joined English Football League Championship club Ipswich Town on 28 August 2015, after Ipswich triggered a buy-out clause inserted into a new one-year deal he had signed in June, which meant he could move on if a foreign club made an offer of 50,000 Polish Zloty, just over £8,500. He made his debut a day later coming on as a substitute in the 2–3 home defeat to Brighton & Hove Albion. He made six appearances for the Championship club during the 2015–16 season.

On 24 March, Malarczyk joined Southend United on loan until the end of the 2015–16 season. He made his debut for Southend in a 0–1 defeat to Bradford City on 30 April. Malarczyk made one further appearance during his loan spell before returning to Ipswich at the end of the season.

== International career ==
Malarczyk has won caps for Poland at U19, U20 and U21 levels.

== Career statistics ==
Appearances and goals by club, season and competition
Club	Season	League			National cup (Note: Includes Polish Cup, FA Cup)		League cup (Note: Includes EFL Cup)		Other		Total	
Club	Season	Division	Apps	Goals	Apps	Goals	Apps	Goals	Apps	Goals	Apps	Goals
Korona Kielce II	2008–09	III liga, gr. G	14	2	—		—		—		14	2
Korona Kielce	2009–10	Ekstraklasa	6	0	2	0	—		—		8	0
Korona Kielce	2010–11	Ekstraklasa	11	0	1	0	—		—		12	0
Korona Kielce	2011–12	Ekstraklasa	16	1	1	0	—		—		17	1
Korona Kielce	2012–13	Ekstraklasa	25	2	2	0	—		—		27	2
Korona Kielce	2013–14	Ekstraklasa	27	3	1	0	—		—		28	3
Korona Kielce	2014–15	Ekstraklasa	35	2	1	0	—		—		36	2
Korona Kielce	2015–16	Ekstraklasa	5	0	0	0	—		—		5	0
Korona Kielce	Total		125	8	8	0	—		—		133	8
Ipswich Town	2015–16	Championship	3	0	2	0	1	0	—		6	0
Southend United (loan)	2015–16	League One	2	0	0	0	0	0	0	0	2	0
Cracovia	2016–17	Ekstraklasa	20	0	0	0	—		0	0	20	0
Cracovia	2017–18	Ekstraklasa	16	1	0	0	—		—		16	1
Cracovia	Total		36	1	0	0	—		—		36	1
Korona Kielce	2017–18	Ekstraklasa	7	0	0	0	—		—		7	0
Korona Kielce	2018–19	Ekstraklasa	16	0	1	0	—		—		17	0
Korona Kielce	Total		23	0	1	0	—		—		24	0
Korona Kielce II	2018–19	IV liga Holy Cross	8	2	—		—		—		8	2
Korona Kielce II	2019–20	III liga, gr. IV	1	0	—		—		—		1	0
Korona Kielce II	Total		9	2	—		—		—		9	2
Piast Gliwice	2019–20	Ekstraklasa	11	0	1	0	—		0	0	12	0
Piast Gliwice	2020–21	Ekstraklasa	14	2	2	0	—		1 (Note: Appearance in UEFA Europa League)	0	17	2
Piast Gliwice	Total		25	2	3	0	—		1	0	29	2
Korona Kielce	2021–22	I liga	28	1	1	1	—		2 (Note: Appearances in I liga promotion play-offs)	0	31	2
Korona Kielce	2022–23	Ekstraklasa	17	3	1	0	—		—		18	3
Korona Kielce	2023–24	Ekstraklasa	22	0	2	0	—		—		24	0
Korona Kielce	2024–25	Ekstraklasa	4	0	0	0	—		—		4	0
Korona Kielce	Total		71	4	4	1	—		2	0	77	5
Korona Kielce II	2022–23	III liga, gr. IV	1	0	—		—		—		1	0
Career total			309	19	18	1	1	0	3	0	331	20

== Honours ==
Korona Kielce II

- IV liga Świętokrzyskie: 2018–19
