= Malcolm Webster (footballer) =

English footballer

Personal information
- Date of birth: 12 November 1950 (age 75)
- Place of birth: Doncaster, England
- Position: Goalkeeper

Youth career
- 1966–1969: Arsenal

Senior career*
Years	Team	Apps	(Gls)
1969–1970	Arsenal	3	(0)
1970–1974	Fulham	94	(0)
1974–1976	Southend United	96	(0)
1976–1984	Cambridge United	256	(0)
Total		449	(0)
- * Club domestic league appearances and goals

Malcolm Webster (born 12 November 1950 in Doncaster) is an English former professional footballer who made 449 appearances in the Football League playing as a goalkeeper for Arsenal, Fulham, Southend United and Cambridge United. At Arsenal he contributed to their victory in the 1969–70 Inter-Cities Fairs Cup by making one appearance in the cup run. He was assistant manager to Chris Turner at Cambridge United between 1986 and 1988 before taking a break from football. He then became a goalkeeping coach, and has worked for clubs including Norwich City, Colchester United, Ipswich Town, Heart of Midlothian, Southampton and Crystal Palace, he also runs a goalkeeping school with business partner, Bolton Wanderers goalkeeping coach, Fred Barber.
