= Myles Kenlock =

English footballer (born 1996)

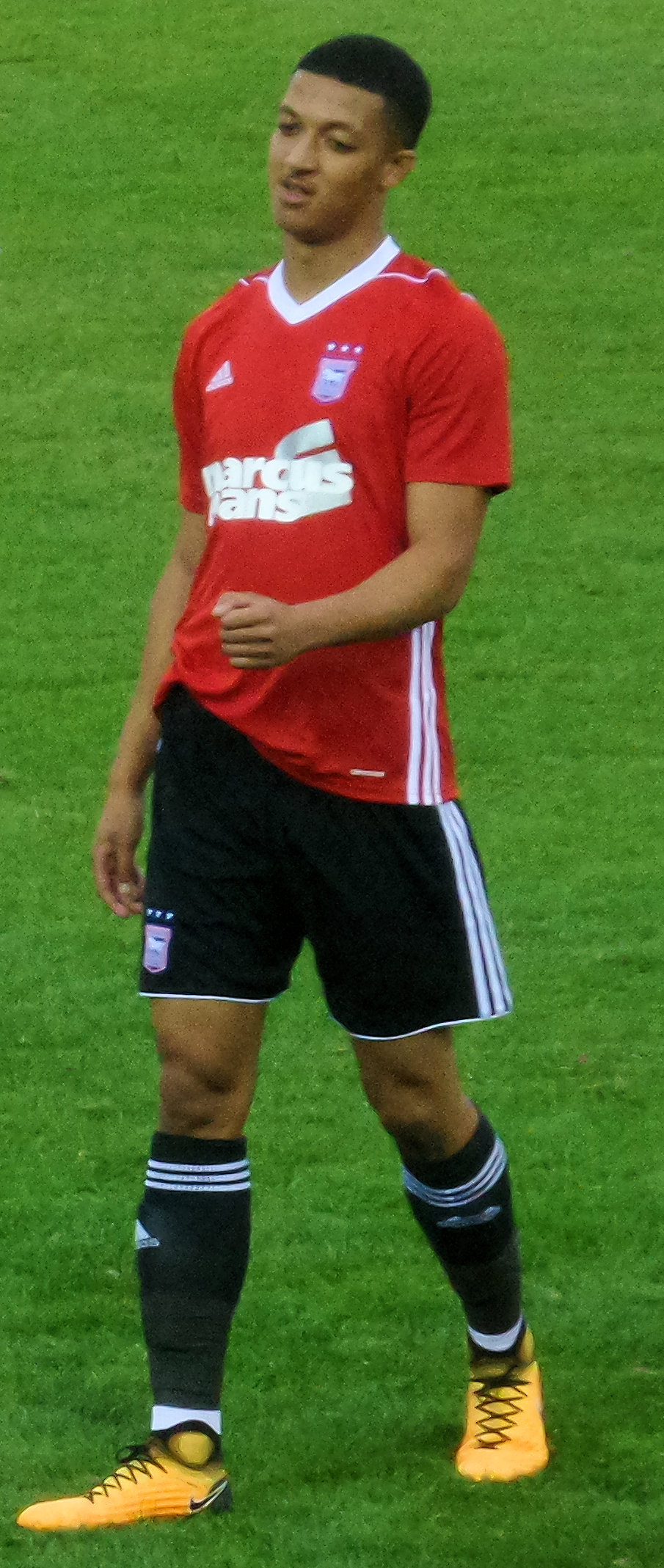
- Kenlock playing for Ipswich Town in 2017

Personal information
- Full name: Myles Lewis George Kenlock
- Date of birth: 26 November 1996 (age 29)
- Place of birth: Lambeth, England
- Height: 6 ft 1 in (1.85 m)
- Position: Left back

Team information
- Current team: Barnet
- Number: 30

Youth career
- –2013: Crystal Palace
- 2013–2014: Kinetic Academy
- 2014–2015: Ipswich Town

Senior career*
Years	Team	Apps	(Gls)
2015–2022	Ipswich Town	85	(0)
2022	→ Colchester United (loan)	20	(3)
2022–2023	Barrow	8	(0)
2023	Aldershot Town	9	(0)
2023–2024	Ebbsfleet United	28	(0)
2024–	Barnet	43	(1)

International career
2024	England C	1	(0)
- * Club domestic league appearances and goals as of 19:14, 18 August 2026 (UTC)

Myles Lewis George Kenlock (born 26 November 1996) is an English professional footballer who plays as a left-back for Barnet.

== Club career ==
=== Ipswich Town ===
Born in Lambeth, Kenlock was a schoolboy at Crystal Palace before leaving the club and becoming a graduate of Croydon-based charity Kinetic Foundation. He joined the Ipswich Town Academy in April 2014.

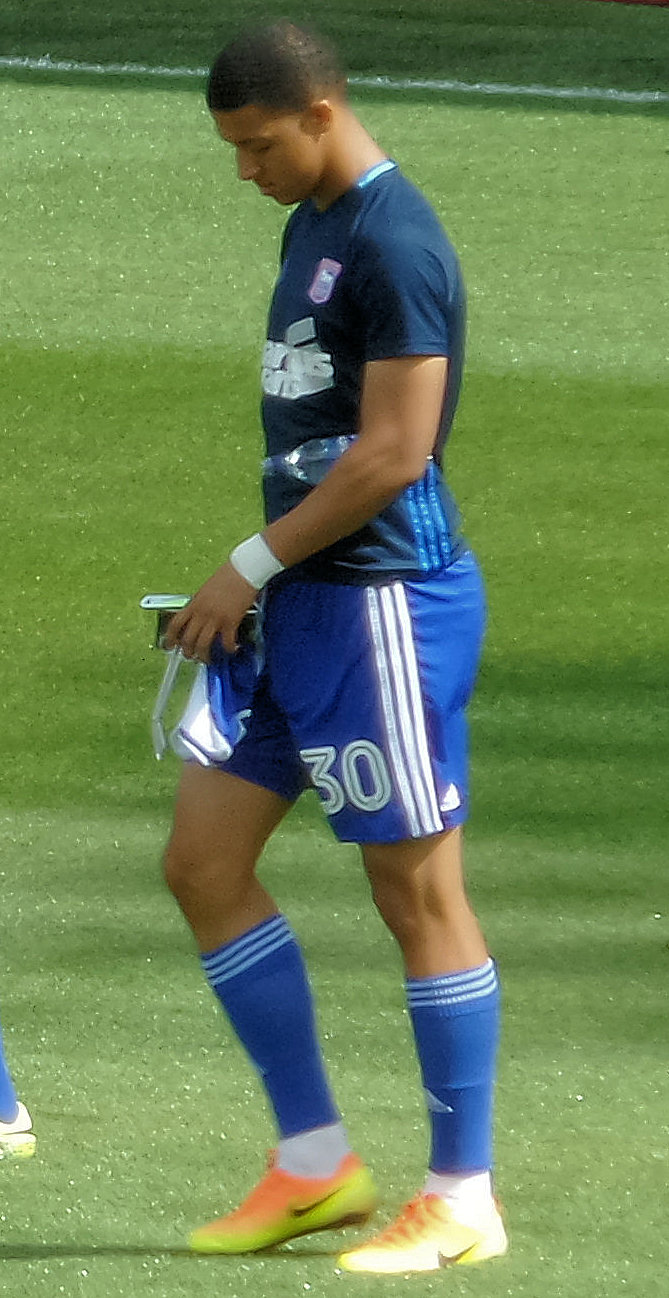
Kenlock warming up for Ipswich Town in 2016

On 24 August 2015, Kenlock signed a two-year professional contract with Ipswich Town, with an option for a further 12 months. Kenlock made his competitive Ipswich debut against Stevenage on 11 August 2015 in the first round of the Football League Cup. He made his league debut for Ipswich on 30 April, starting in a 3–2 home win over Milton Keynes Dons at Portman Road. Kenlock made 5 appearances during his first season in professional football.

Kenlock managed to break into the first team squad during the 2016–17 season. In March 2017, Kenlock signed a new contract with Ipswich, keeping him at the club until 2019, with the option of an additional one-year extension. Although primarily being behind first choice left back Jonas Knudsen in the starting lineup, he made 18 appearances over the course of the season.

He made his first appearance of the 2017–18 season on 8 August, starting in a 2–0 away win over Luton Town in an EFL Cup first round tie. He continued to feature for the first-team as a squad player during the 2017–18 season, making 18 appearances across all competitions.

Following the arrival of Paul Hurst in 2018, Kenlock saw game time limited, only making a single substitute appearance during Hurst's time in charge of the club. Following the departure of Paul Hurst and the arrival of Paul Lambert, he saw more involvement in the first team squad. He was given a consistent run of games towards the second half of the 2018–19 season, making 19 appearances over the course of the season. His improvement throughout the season earned him a one-year extension on his contract, keeping him at the club until 2020.

On 17 July 2019, Kenlock signed a new three-year contract with the club, with the option of a further year extension. He started at left back in the first game of the 2019–20 season as Ipswich won 1–0 away at Burton Albion. Despite starting the first 7 games of the season, Kenlock struggled for consistent game time during the second-half of the season, only making two further league appearances before the season was suspended in March due to the Coronavirus outbreak. He made 17 appearances in all competitions over the course of the season. Kenlock made his 100th appearance for Ipswich on 4 May 2021, playing the full match in a 0–0 draw with Shrewsbury Town.

During the summer of 2021, Kenlock was told by new manager Paul Cook that he was not in his plans for the upcoming season, and was instructed to train with the club's U23s alongside multiple other first team players such as Flynn Downes. Kenlock was subsequently not allocated a squad number for the 2021–22 season, leaving him ineligible to play a league game for the club until January 2022.

==== Colchester United (loan) ====
On 20 January 2022, having made only two appearances for Ipswich during the season, all of which came in the EFL Trophy, Kenlock joined Colchester United on loan for the rest of the 2021–22 season. He made his debut two days later where he scored his first senior goal in a 3–0 win over Salford City.

On 5 May 2022, Ipswich confirmed that Kenlock would be released following the expiration of his contract, ending his 8-year association with the club.

=== Barrow ===
On 4 August 2022, Kenlock joined League Two side Barrow on a free transfer.

=== Aldershot Town ===
On 10 March 2023, Kenlock signed for National League club Aldershot Town on a contract till the end of the season.

=== Ebbsfleet United ===
On 31 October 2023, Kenlock joined National League side Ebbsfleet United.

=== Barnet ===
On 24 June 2024, Kenlock joined National League side Barnet on a three-year deal. He scored one goal in 44 games in his first season, but after sustaining a knee injury, he did not play at all in his second season. The Bees announced that Kenlock was to leave the club at the end of the 2025-26 campaign, but he trained with the club in 2026-27 pre-season and, on 3 August 2026, it was announced that he had signed a new one-year deal with Barnet.

== International career ==
Kenlock was called up to represent the England C team in March 2024. On 19 March, he made his debut in the 1–0 defeat to the Wales C team at Stebonheath Park.

== Career statistics ==
As of match played 18 August 2026

Appearances and goals by club, season and competition
Club	Season	Division	League		FA Cup		League Cup		Other		Total	
Club	Season	Division	Apps	Goals	Apps	Goals	Apps	Goals	Apps	Goals	Apps	Goals
Ipswich Town	2015–16	Championship	2	0	1	0	2	0	—		5	0
Ipswich Town	2016–17	Championship	18	0	0	0	0	0	—		18	0
Ipswich Town	2017–18	Championship	16	0	1	0	1	0	—		18	0
Ipswich Town	2018–19	Championship	19	0	0	0	0	0	—		19	0
Ipswich Town	2019–20	League One	9	0	3	0	0	0	5 (Note: Appearance(s) in EFL Trophy)	0	17	0
Ipswich Town	2020–21	League One	21	0	1	0	1	0	1	0	24	0
Ipswich Town	2021–22	League One	0	0	0	0	0	0	2	0	2	0
Ipswich Town	Total		85	0	6	0	4	0	8	0	103	0
Colchester United (loan)	2021–22	League Two	20	3	0	0	0	0	0	0	20	3
Barrow	2022–23	League Two	8	0	1	0	1	0	3	0	13	0
Aldershot Town	2022–23	National League	9	0	0	0	—		1 (Note: Appearance(s) in FA Trophy)	0	10	0
Ebbsfleet United	2023–24	National League	28	0	0	0	—		1	0	29	0
Barnet	2024–25	National League	42	1	2	0	—		0	0	44	1
Barnet	2025–26	League Two	0	0	0	0	0	0	0	0	0	0
Barnet	2026–27	League Two	1	0	0	0	1	0	1	0	3	0
Barnet	Total		43	1	2	0	1	0	0	0	47	1
Career total			193	4	9	0	6	0	14	0	222	4

== Honours ==
Barnet

- National League: 2024–25
