= Emyr Huws =

Welsh football player (born 1993)

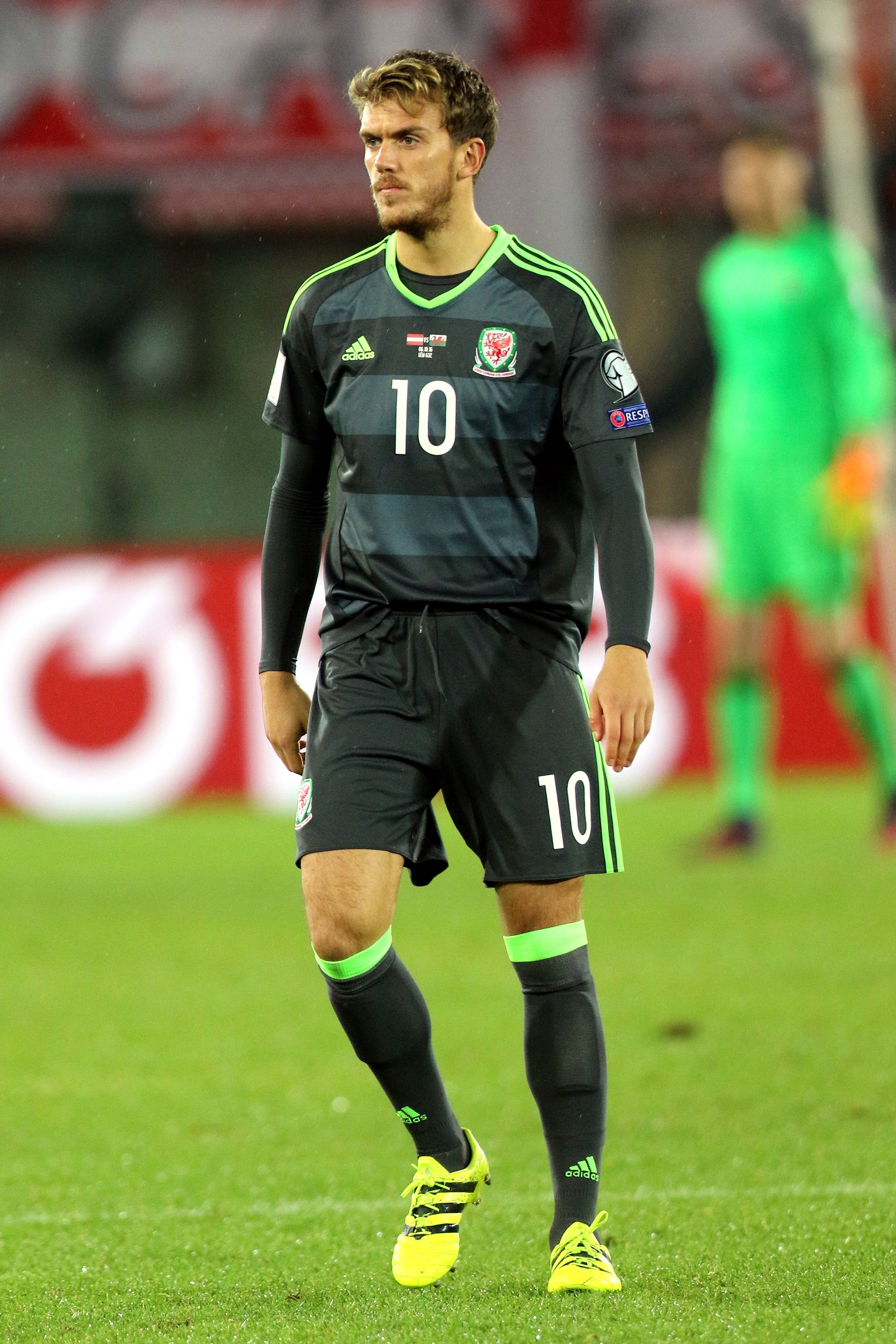
- Huws playing for Wales in 2016

Personal information
- Full name: Emyr Wyn Huws
- Date of birth: 30 September 1993 (age 33)
- Place of birth: Llanelli, Wales
- Height: 1.85 m (6 ft 1 in)
- Position: Midfielder

Youth career
- 2004–2009: Swansea City
- 2009–2012: Manchester City

Senior career*
Years	Team	Apps	(Gls)
2012–2014	Manchester City	0	(0)
2012–2013	→ Northampton Town (loan)	10	(0)
2014	→ Birmingham City (loan)	17	(2)
2014	→ Wigan Athletic (loan)	5	(0)
2014–2016	Wigan Athletic	11	(0)
2015–2016	→ Huddersfield Town (loan)	30	(5)
2016–2017	Cardiff City	3	(0)
2017	→ Ipswich Town (loan)	13	(3)
2017–2021	Ipswich Town	31	(1)
2022–2023	Colchester United	18	(1)
Total		138	(12)

International career^{‡}
2008–2009	Wales U17	11	(0)
2011	Wales U19	4	(0)
2012–2013	Wales U21	6	(1)
2014–2017	Wales	11	(1)
- * Club domestic league appearances and goals as of 16:51, 15 May 2022 (UTC) ‡ National team caps and goals as of 10:20, 17 November 2019 (UTC)

Emyr Wyn Huws (born 30 September 1993) is a Welsh former professional footballer who played as a midfielder for the Wales national team. He retired in December 2023.

He came through the youth systems of Swansea City and Manchester City before turning professional with the latter. He spent time on loan at Northampton Town and Birmingham City, and signed for Wigan Athletic in 2014 after a brief loan spell. During his time at Wigan Athletic, he spent time on loan at Huddersfield Town, before signing for Cardiff City in 2016. He spent one season at Cardiff, spending most of his time at the club out on loan at Ipswich Town. He signed permanently for Ipswich in 2017.

After representing his country at youth levels up to under-21, Huws made his debut for the Wales senior team in 2014.

== Club career ==
=== Manchester City ===
Huws started his career with a five-year spell at Swansea City, since he was seven, before he was signed by Premier League club Manchester City in 2009. He developed to become captain of the club's under-21 side.

He scored for City in the 2012–13 season of the NextGen Series youth tournament, in a 3–1 win over Fenerbahçe at Ewen Fields. After returning from a loan spell at Northampton Town, Huws made his debut for Manchester City on 15 January 2014, coming on as a substitute against Blackburn Rovers in an FA Cup third-round replay. On 5 August 2014, Huws signed a two-year contract with the club, keeping him until 2016.

==== Northampton Town (loan) ====
He joined Northampton Town of League Two on a three-month loan deal in October 2012. He made his debut for the "Cobblers" on 13 October, in 3–0 win over Exeter City at Sixfields. He received public praise from manager Aidy Boothroyd and captain Kelvin Langmead. After making ten appearances, Huws' loan spell at Northampton Town came to an end.

==== Birmingham City (loan) ====
On 28 January 2014, Huws joined Football League Championship club Birmingham City on an initial one-month youth loan. He went straight into the starting eleven for the match at home to Derby County on 1 February, and his stoppage-time shot rebounded off the post for Federico Macheda's equaliser. The loan spell was extended until the end of the season, and Huws was voted Birmingham's player of the month for February. After 69 minutes of the home match with Burnley on 12 March, Huws chested the ball down and volleyed past the goalkeeper from 25 yards (23 m) for his first goal for the club, and Birmingham's second in a 3–3 draw. He scored his second goal in a 3–1 loss away to Middlesbrough, with a stunning thirty-five yard shot that led to the club's 'Goal of the Season' voting to be relaunched, with Huws' goal becoming a contender and ultimately winning it.

=== Wigan Athletic ===
On 22 July 2014, Huws signed for Wigan Athletic on a six-month loan. Huws made his Wigan Athletic debut in the opening game of the season, in a 2–2 draw against Reading.

After making five appearances in the first month to the season, Huws' move was then made permanent on 1 September 2014, with Huws signing a four-year contract. Because of his move to Wigan was made permanent, Swansea City, his first youth club, received £250,000, due to a ten per cent sell-on clause agreed. Huws' first game after signing for the club on a permanent basis came on 13 September 2014, in a 3–1 loss against Blackburn Rovers. However, Huws made sixteen appearances for the club after being on the sidelines with injuries for most of the time. By May, Huws was making progress of recovering from injury.

However, ahead of the 2015–16 season, Huws suffered a knee injury during a pre-season friendly match and was sidelined for another month.

==== Huddersfield Town (loan) ====
On 27 August 2015, Huws joined Football League Championship side Huddersfield Town on loan for the 2015–16 season in a move which saw Jordy Hiwula go in the other direction. However, Huws' decision to join Huddersfield Town was criticised by Manager Gary Caldwell, though he welcomed him to play for the club again.

He made his début as a substitute for Jonathan Hogg in the 2–0 loss to Cardiff City on 12 September. He made his first start three days later in the 2–1 win against Charlton Athletic at The Valley, in which he scored a free-kick for the Terriers. On 19 September, he scored a brace against Bolton Wanderers helping them win from 1–0 down at the John Smiths's stadium where Town won 4–1. Five days, Huws' goalscoring form continued when he scored his fourth goal in 3 starts as Huddersfield drew 1–1 with Nottingham Forest at home. As a result, Huws was named the club's player of the month for September. Huws continued to be in the first team regular at the club and ended his thirteen games without scoring when he scored on his return from injury, in a 3–1 win over Preston. Despite another injury in February, Huws went on to make thirty appearances for the club and scoring five times before returning to his parent club.

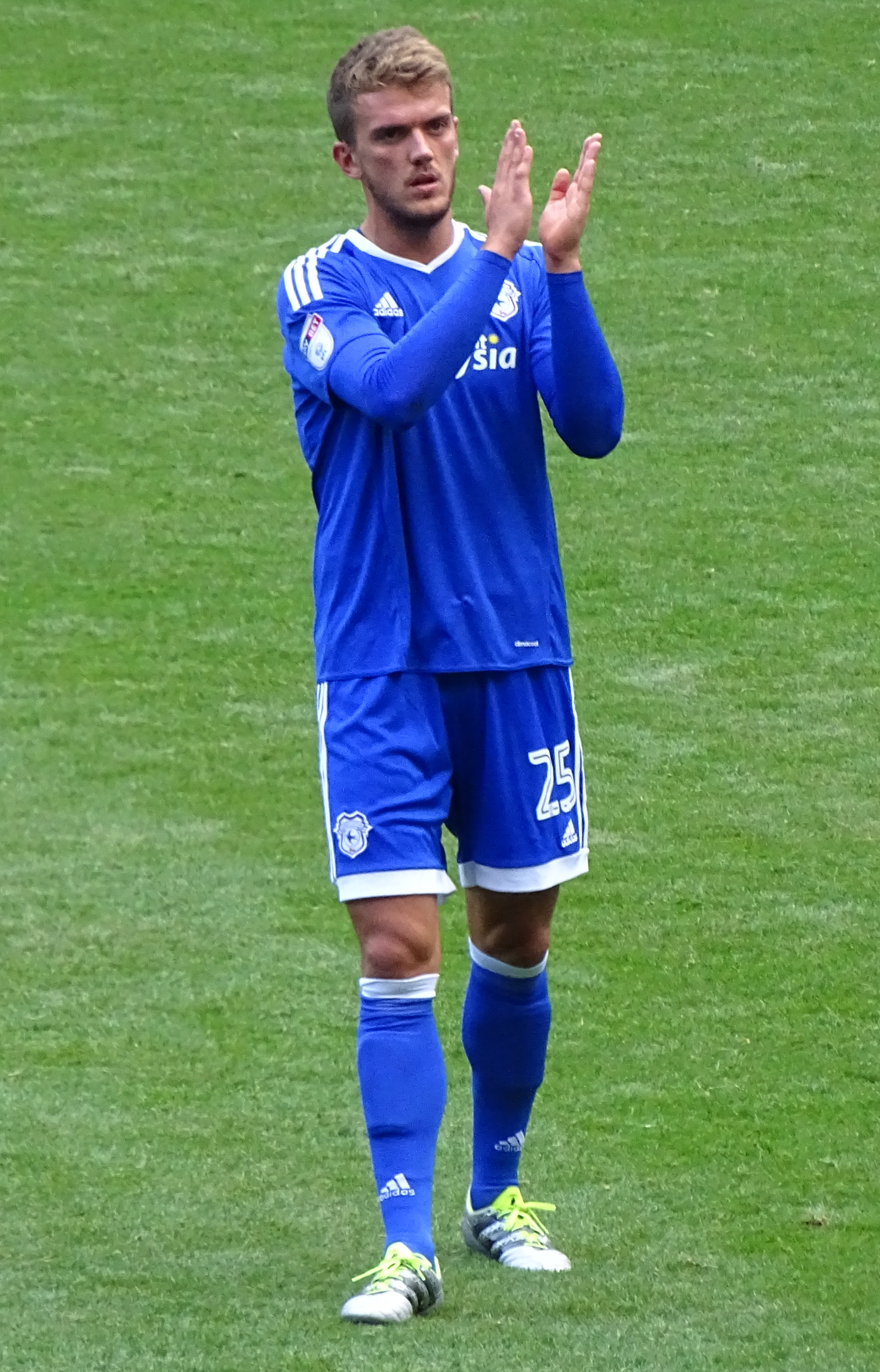
Huws playing for Cardiff City in 2016

=== Cardiff City ===
On 12 August 2016, Huws joined Football League Championship side Cardiff City for an undisclosed fee on a three-year deal. He made his debut two days later as a substitute, replacing Lex Immers during a 2–0 defeat against Queens Park Rangers.

=== Ipswich Town ===
On 31 January 2017, Huws joined Championship side Ipswich Town on loan until the end of the 2016–17 season. He scored his first Ipswich goal during an away match against Aston Villa on 11 February 2017. He made 18 appearances during his loan spell at Portman Road, scoring 3 goals. In July 2017, Huws completed a permanent transfer to Ipswich, signing a four-year deal for an undisclosed fee.

He suffered from injury during his full season at Portman Road. After missing the start of the 2017–18 season due to an Achilles injury he picked up during pre-season, he only managed to make 5 appearances before suffering a cartilage tear in his knee during a 2–0 defeat to Middlesbrough on 9 December 2017, ruling him out for the remainder of the season.

Huws remained on the sidelines for the entire 2018–19 season, due to a reoccurring problem with the knee injury he suffered in December 2017. He featured infrequently for Ipswich's under-23 side whilst undergoing rehabilitation. He only featured in a single matchday squad during the season, being named on the bench, in a 1–0 win over Rotherham United at Portman Road on 12 January 2019, but did not make an appearance.

Huws made his first return to competitive first-team football since December 2017 on the opening day of the 2019–20 season, coming on as a 79th-minute substitute in a 1–0 win against Burton Albion at the Pirelli Stadium. He scored his first goal following his return to the first-team on 8 October 2019, opening the scoring in a 4–0 home win over Gillingham in a group stage match of the EFL Trophy.

He was in and out of the team during the early part of the 2020–21 season. On 15 December 2020, Huws scored the winner in a 2–1 home win over Burton Albion, his first league goal since signing permanently for Ipswich in 2017. On 10 May 2021, Ipswich announced that Huws would be released following the end of his contract.

=== Colchester United ===
On 15 January 2022, Huws joined EFL League Two side Colchester United on a short-term contract until the end of the 2021–22 season. The move reunited Huws with several former Ipswich teammates, including Luke Chambers, Cole Skuse, Alan Judge and Freddie Sears. Huws was released at the end of the 2022–23 season.

=== Retirement ===
On 18 December 2023, Huws announced his retirement from professional football at the age of 30 after being unattached since his release from Colchester United.

== International career ==
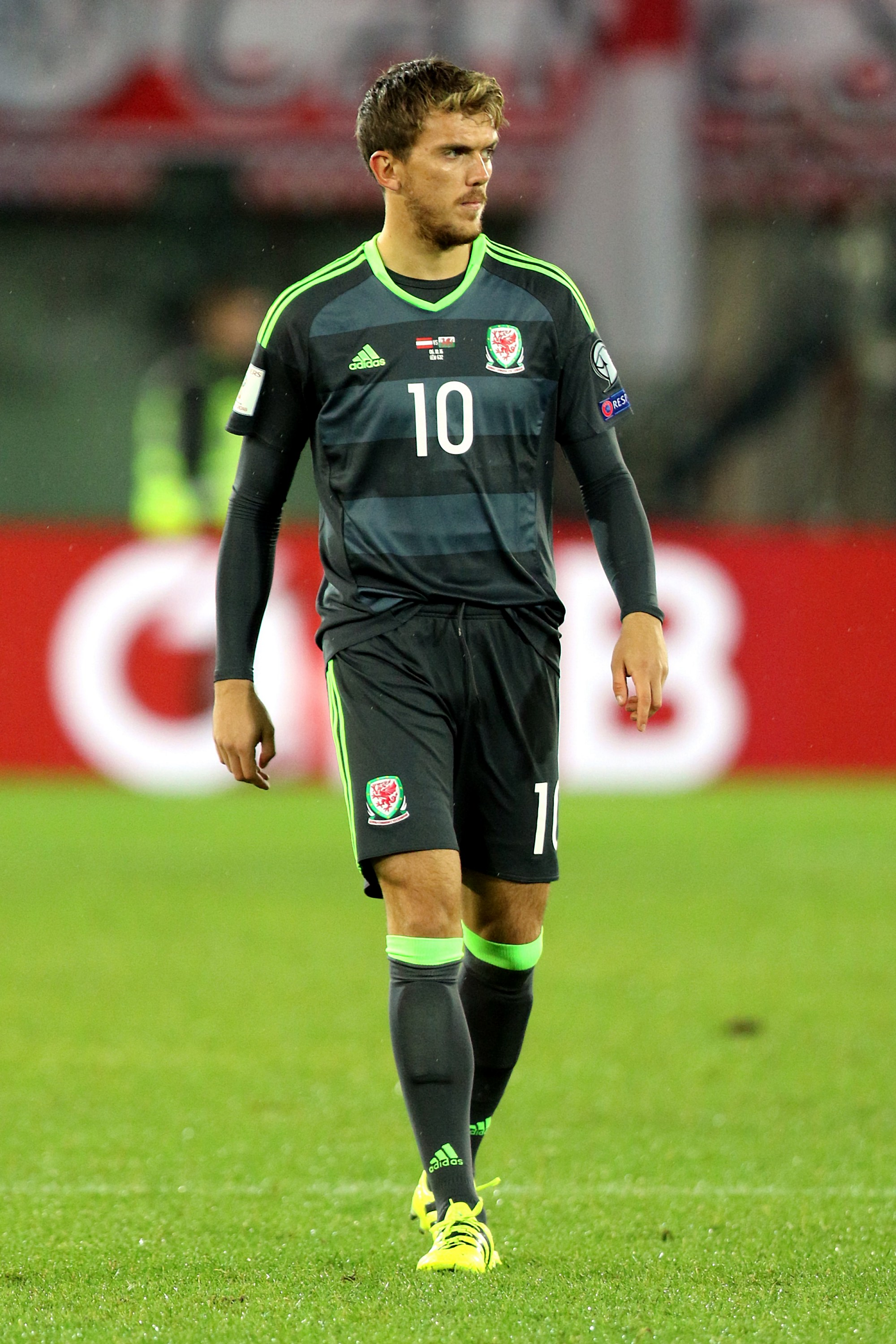
Huws in action for Wales in 2016

Huws won his first cap for the Wales U21 team in 2012, having previously won caps for Wales at under-17 and under-19 levels. He made his debut for Wales' under-21 side on 10 September 2012 in a 5–0 defeat to the Czech Republic. He scored his first international goal on 14 August 2013, scoring Wales' only goal in a 5–1 loss to Finland.

Huws made his senior debut for Wales in a friendly against Iceland on 5 March 2014. In the absence of fellow midfielders Aaron Ramsey, Joe Ledley and David Vaughan, Huws took on the holding midfield role and played the whole match as Wales won 3–1. He won 3 further caps in 2014, including appearances against Moldova and Belgium in the 2016 UEFA European Championship qualifiers.

He scored his first international goal on 13 November 2015, coming on as a second-half substitute for Joe Ledley, he converted a Joe Allen cross to bring Wales back to 2–2 against the Netherlands. However Wales went on to lose the game 3–2.

In May 2016, Huws was listed for the 29-man squad for a pre-Euro 2016 training camp. He made 2 appearances in friendlies against Ukraine on 6 March and against Sweden on 5 June. Huws was among six players to be cut for the Euro 2016 squad. Later that year, he was included in the Wales squad for the 2018 FIFA World Cup qualification. He won 4 caps during the group stages of Wales' qualifying campaign, as Wales finished 3rd in Group D, failing to qualify for the 2018 FIFA World Cup as a result.

Huws was called up to the Wales squad in 2017 for friendlies against France and Panama, but had to withdraw from the squad on 17 November due to injury.

== Personal life ==
Born in Llanelli, Emyr Huws attended Ysgol Gynradd Pum Heol and Ysgol y Strade. He is a fluent Welsh speaker.

== Career statistics ==
=== Club ===
Appearances and goals by club, season and competition
Club	Season	League			FA Cup		League Cup		Other		Total	
Club	Season	Division	Apps	Goals	Apps	Goals	Apps	Goals	Apps	Goals	Apps	Goals
Manchester City	2012–13	Premier League	0	0	0	0	0	0	—		0	0
Manchester City	2013–14	Premier League	0	0	1	0	0	0	—		1	0
Manchester City	2014–15	Premier League	0	0	0	0	0	0	—		0	0
Manchester City	Total		0	0	1	0	0	0	0	0	1	0
Northampton Town (loan)	2012–13	League Two	10	0	2	0	0	0	1 (Note: Appearance in Football League Trophy)	0	13	0
Birmingham City (loan)	2013–14	Championship	17	2	0	0	0	0	—		17	2
Wigan Athletic	2014–15 (Note: Huws played for Wigan 5 times on loan during 2014–15 before signing for the club permanently on 1 September)	Championship	16	0	0	0	0	0	—		16	0
Wigan Athletic	2015–16	Championship	0	0	0	0	0	0	—		0	0
Wigan Athletic	Total		16	0	0	0	0	0	0	0	16	0
Huddersfield Town (loan)	2015–16	Championship	30	5	1	0	0	0	—		31	5
Cardiff City	2016–17	Championship	3	0	1	0	0	0	—		4	0
Ipswich Town (loan)	2016–17	Championship	13	3	0	0	0	0	—		13	3
Ipswich Town	2017–18	Championship	5	0	0	0	0	0	—		5	0
Ipswich Town	2018–19	Championship	0	0	0	0	0	0	—		0	0
Ipswich Town	2019–20	League One	17	0	3	0	1	0	4 (Note: Appearance(s) in EFL Trophy)	1	25	1
Ipswich Town	2020–21	League One	9	1	1	0	1	0	1	0	12	1
Ipswich Town	Total		44	4	4	0	2	0	5	1	55	5
Colchester United	2021–22	League Two	12	1	—		—		—		12	1
Colchester United	2022–23	League Two	6	0	0	0	0	0	1	0	7	0
Colchester United	Total		18	1	0	0	0	0	1	0	19	1
Career total			138	12	9	0	2	0	7	1	156	13

=== International ===
Appearances and goals by national team and year
National team	Year	Apps	Goals
Wales	2014	4	0
Wales	2015	1	1
Wales	2016	5	0
Wales	2017	1	0
Total		11	1

=== International goals ===
Wales score listed first, score column indicates score after each Huws goal.

International goals by date, venue, cap, opponent, score, result and competition
No.	Date	Venue	Cap	Opponent	Score	Result	Competition	Ref
1	13 November 2015	Cardiff City Stadium, Cardiff, Wales	5	Netherlands	2–2	2–3	Friendly	

== Honours ==
Individual

- Birmingham City Goal of the Season: 2013–14
