= Cole Skuse =

English footballer (born 1986)

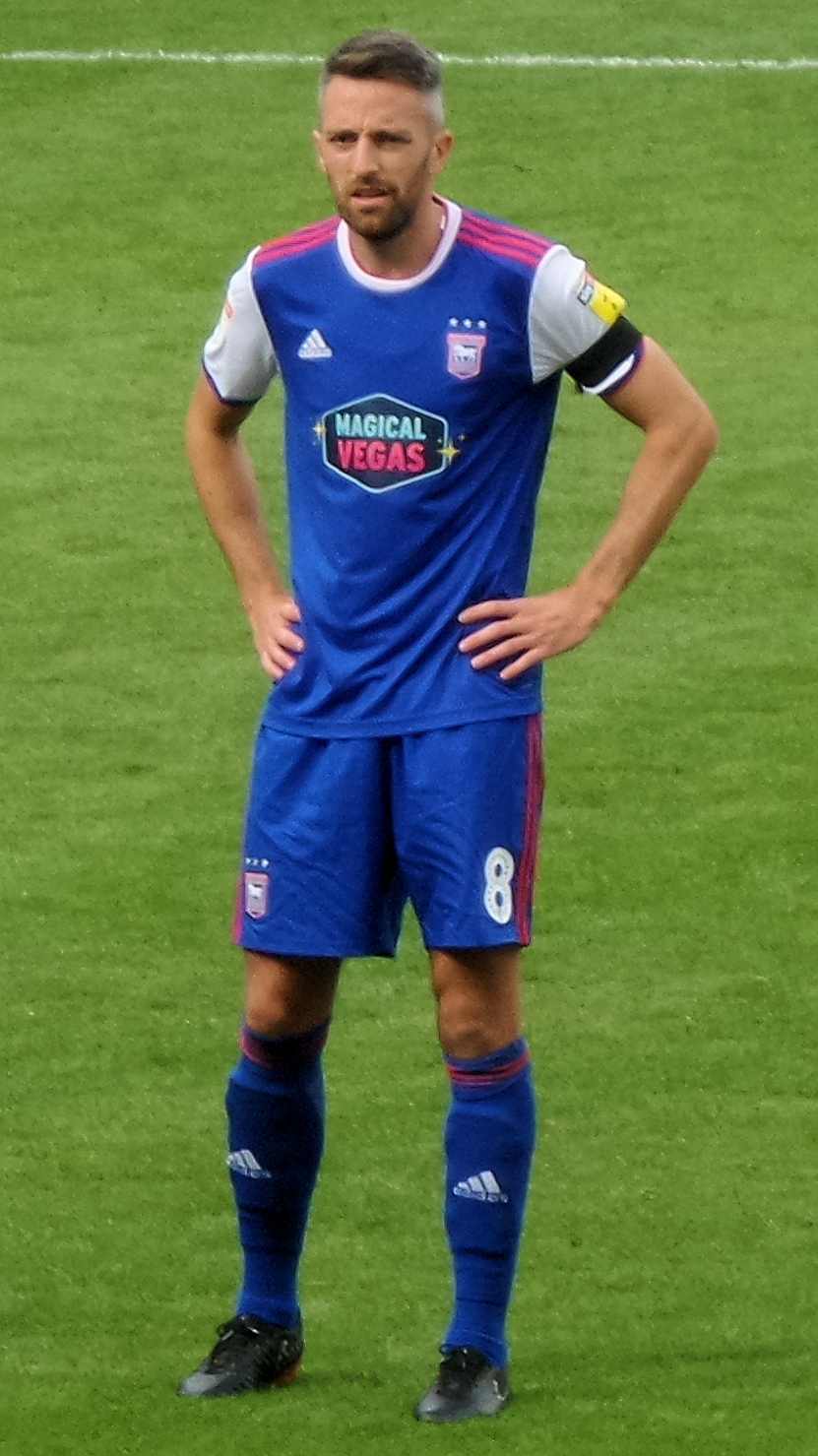
- Skuse playing for Ipswich Town in 2018

Personal information
- Full name: Cole Skuse
- Date of birth: 29 March 1986 (age 40)
- Place of birth: Yate, England
- Height: 6 ft 1 in (1.85 m)
- Position: Defensive midfielder

Team information
- Current team: Bury Town (manager)

Youth career
- 1996–2004: Bristol City

Senior career*
Years	Team	Apps	(Gls)
2004–2013	Bristol City	279	(9)
2013–2021	Ipswich Town	268	(2)
2021–2023	Colchester United	68	(1)
Total		615	(12)

Managerial career
- 2023–: Bury Town
- * Club domestic league appearances and goals

Cole Skuse (born 29 March 1986) is an English former footballer who played as a midfielder. He is currently the manager of Bury Town.

He started his footballing career at Bristol City, where he graduated from the club's academy and went on to make over 300 appearances in all competitions in a nine-year spell with the club. He joined Ipswich Town on a free transfer in 2013, going on to spend eight years at Ipswich before departing in 2021. He joined fellow East Anglian club Colchester United later the same year. A defensive midfielder, Skuse also has experience at both right-back and centre-back. He is also a PE teacher at St Joseph's College, Ipswich.

== Club career ==
=== Bristol City ===
As an academy graduate, Skuse was given his senior debut by player-manager Brian Tinnion as a substitute away at Colchester United on 19 February 2005. He later described the moment as the best of his career. He signed his first professional contract, a two-year deal, in April 2005, amidst interest from Premiership sides Charlton and Bolton. Skuse started the last four games of the season, replacing Jamie Smith in defense. The club was in contention for the promotion play-offs until a draw with Doncaster on the penultimate match-day.

Skuse spent the first three months of the 2005–06 season in the team of new manager Gary Johnson, but was in and out of the team the rest of the season. He signed a new deal in January 2006, this time a four-year contract keeping him tied to the club until the summer of 2009. Skuse scored his first goal for his club, a penalty in the 6–0 win over Gillingham on 18 March 2006. His first goal from open play came the following week away to Rotherham. Skuse finished the season having made 29 starts in the league, as the club finished in 9th position, six points shy of the promotion play-offs.

Skuse began the 2006–07 season in the starting eleven, but was dropped after being substituted off at half-time against Blackpool on 19 August. His next start came nearly two months later, setting off a run of 27 starts in 29 league matches. The club finished the season in second place, earning their first participation in the second-tier in eight seasons. Skuse made 42 appearances in the league, as well as 5 in the FA Cup, in which the Robins were eliminated in a fourth-round replay by Middlesbrough.

On 18 August 2007, Skuse received his EFL Championship debut, replacing Alex Russell in a draw with Blackpool. His full debut came on 24 November in a defeat to Leicester City. Skuse was used mostly off the bench in his first season in the Championship, making 25 appearances in the league, but just 5 starts. However, Skuse had a run of four starts in March and April, replacing winter signing Nick Carle in the team. In May 2007, Skuse was watched closely by Reading. However, claims that Reading had made an offer for the player were dismissed by Bristol City, who had Skuse under contract until the end of the 2008–09 season. The club finished the season in fourth, five points off an automatic promotion place, and lost in the promotion final to Hull, with Skuse absent from the squad. At the end of the campaign, Skuse was tipped by many City fans to be voted as the club's young player of the year, but this was instead awarded to Nicky Maynard.

Skuse began the 2008–09 season in the team for the first time since the club's promotion to the Championship, and started the club's first nine games, playing both in midfield and at right-back. After that, Skuse was out injured for nearly two months. He returned to enter as a half-time substitute for Jamie McCombe against Nottingham Forest, but missed the next three games, before returning again on 8 December against Swansea City. His first goal in the Championship came against Norwich on 7 February, and he scored again two weeks later against Reading. In total, Skuse made 29 starts in the league that season, as well as starting all four cup games, as the club finished in 10th.

After signing a new deal at City in summer 2009, Skuse scored his first goal of the 2009–10 season in a 1–1 home draw with Peterborough. Skuse's second of the campaign, and sixth for Bristol City, came away at Leicester City, to help his team to a 3–1 victory. He wound up making a career-high 43 appearances in the league, and started every match bar one after September, playing alongside Marvin Elliott in midfield. Skuse was voted the club's player of the season for the 2009–10 season, as well as young player of the year. At the time, only Matt Hill had won both awards in the same season. After the season, new manager Steve Coppell offered Skuse a new extended contract until 2013, which he signed. He also started all four cup games for the club that season, including an FA Cup third-round replay defeat to rivals Cardiff City. Skuse has not played in multiple matches in either cup competition in a single season since.

Skuse made 30 appearances in the 2010–11 season, again partnered with Elliott. He picked up an injury on 25 January against Nottingham Forest, missing the next two months. Involved in the relegation battle, the club climbed five positions in the table during his injury, and finished the season in 15th. His only goal of the season came on the penultimate match-day against Derby County.

Skuse started the first eight games of the 2011–12 season, but was left out of the squad for the next two, which proved to be the final matches for Keith Millen in charge. The club hired new manager Derek McInnes from St Johnstone, who played Skuse in the full-back position on the right hand side. After picking up another toe injury against Crystal Palace on 14 February, Skuse missed the next month and a half. Upon his return, Skuse was returned to the midfield, and winter transfer Ricky Foster was used at right-back. Skuse scored the first goal in a 2–0 win at home to Barnsley on 21 April, securing the club's Championship status for next season. He also scored in a 1–1 draw with West Ham a few days earlier, and finished the season with two goals in 36 starts, as the club finished in 20th, nine points clear of relegation.

Skuse returned to his more familiar midfield position ahead of the 2012–13 season. On 6 November, he picked up an injury away to Birmingham, and missed the next month and a half. The club were in the relegation zone, in the middle of a seven match losing streak. He missed the whole month of February with a separate injury picked up against Watford. At the end of his last season with the club, Bristol City could not avoid relegation to League One, and Skuse left the club on a free transfer, although he later said the two were not related. His final appearance for the club came on 1 April 2013, in a draw against Sheffield Wednesday, and Skuse made 25 appearances in the league in his last season. He represented Bristol City 307 times across all competitions during his tenure, scoring 9 goals.

=== Ipswich Town ===
On 14 May 2013, Skuse signed a three-year deal with Ipswich Town. His professional debut with the club came in against Reading on 3 August, scoring an own-goal in the 3–1 defeat. He became an integral part of the Ipswich midfield during his first season at Portman Road, making a career-high 43 starts in the league, and was mostly partnered with Luke Hyam.

Skuse continued to serve as a first team regular during the 2014–15 season. He scored his first goal for Ipswich against Cardiff City on 14 April 2015, in his 82nd game for the club, with the strike eventually winning him the club's goal of the season award for the 2014–15 season. Skuse helped guide Ipswich to a 6th-place finish in the Championship table in the 2014–2015 season, qualifying for the play-offs as a result, their first appearance since 2005. However, Ipswich remained in the Championship following defeat to rivals Norwich in the play off semi-finals. Skuse made 40 starts during the regular season, partnering Hyam for the first half of the season, and mostly Teddy Bishop for the second half.

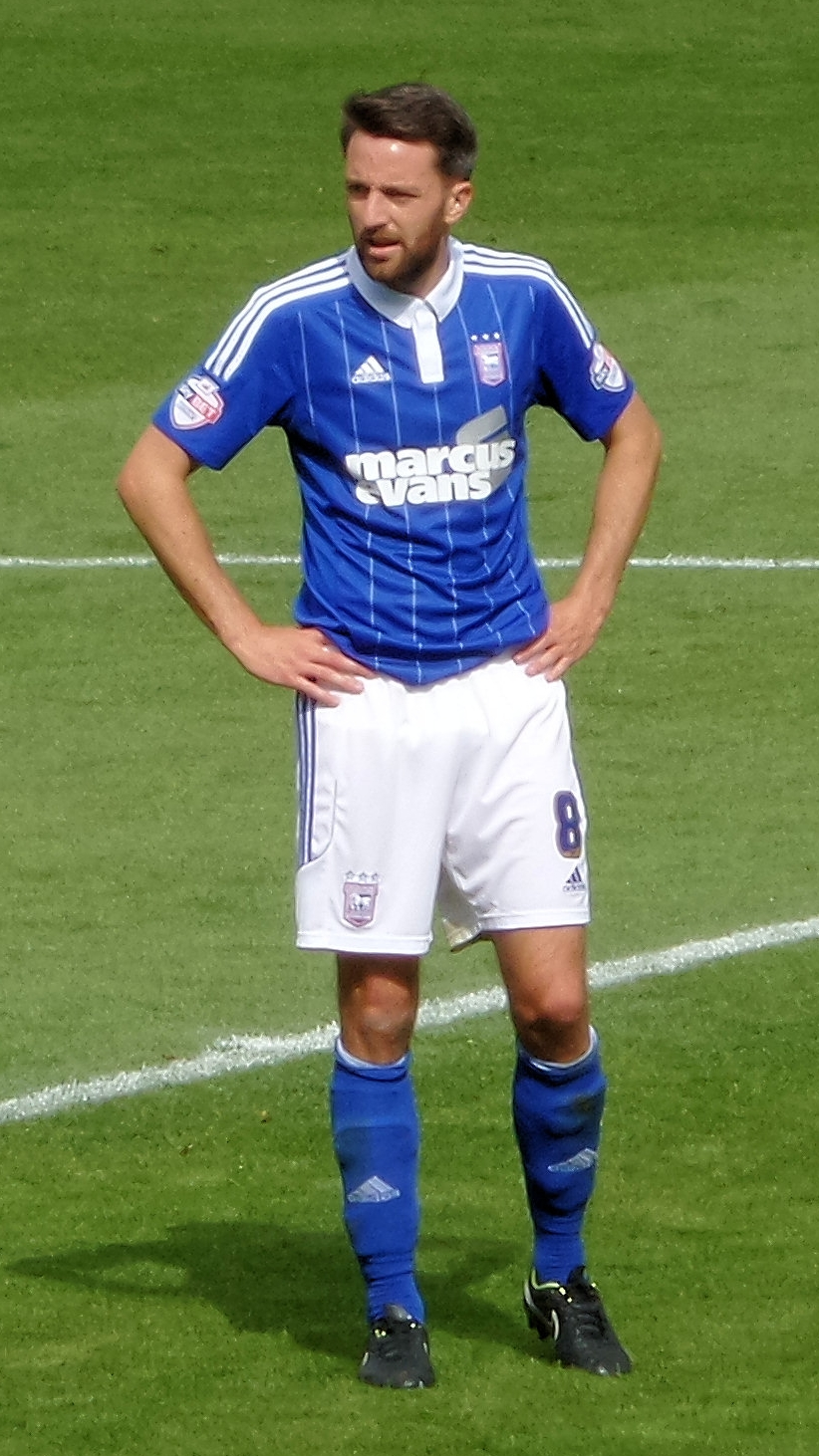
Skuse playing for Ipswich Town in 2015

Skuse was partnered with Brentford signing Jonathan Douglas during the 2015–16 season. On 19 October, Skuse signed a new contract, keeping him at Ipswich until 2018 with a year's option. He made his 100th appearance with the club two-weeks later against Cardiff. After a draw against Wolverhampton on 21 November, manager McCarthy spoke of Skuse as a "Premier League footballer". Skuse made 39 starts in the league that season, missing a month after sustaining a toe injury on 6 February against QPR. He wore the captain's armband from the start for the first time on 30 April, in a win over MK Dons. Ipswich finished the season in 7th, five points off the promotion play-offs.

Having missed the previous season's clash through injury, Skuse made his return to Ashton Gate on 3 December 2016 in a 2–0 defeat. Skuse made 40 starts in 2016–17, missing six games due to injury during the long Championship season. He also tallied four assists, matching his career high achieved with Bristol in 2012. Skuse began the season partnering Douglas in midfield, but spent most of the second half of the season alongside Cardiff City spring loanee Emyr Huws, with Grant Ward just in front of them.

Skuse started the club's first 22 matches in the league in 2017–18, until he left a win against Reading at half-time on 16 December with an ankle injury. He scored his second goal for the club on 16 September 2017, producing a strike from the edge of the box in a 2–0 win over Bolton Wanderers at Portman Road. Skuse didn't find a consistent midfield partner until November, when Everton loanee Callum Connolly was given his first start there of the season. On 8 February 2018, Skuse signed a new two-year deal at Portman Road, keeping him at the club until the summer of 2020, with the option of a further year. His 200th appearance in all competitions for Ipswich came on 6 March against Sheffield Wednesday, and he was the only player signed by manager Mick McCarthy to have reached the benchmark during his tenure. Skuse made 39 starts that season, captaining the side on eight occasions through the absence of Luke Chambers, as Ipswich finished in mid-table.

Skuse spent most of the 2018–19 season alongside Chelsea loanee Trevoh Chalobah in midfield, starting 19 of the club's first 20 matches in the league. He was stretchered off against East Anglian rivals Norwich on 2 September after a clash of heads with Timm Klose, but returned for the club's next game against Hull two weeks later. Having impressed for new manager Paul Lambert in the six matches since his takeover, Skuse suffered a knee injury in training and missed most of the month of December, being replaced in the team by Jon Nolan. His return to the team came on 12 January against fellow relegation strugglers Rotherham. Skuse made just 13 starts in 2019, as Ipswich were relegated to the third-tier for their first participation since 1957.

Skuse captained the side on the opening day of his first campaign in League One in 12 seasons, with regular captain Luke Chambers out through suspension. Skuse started the club's opening 17 games of the season in the league, mostly alongside Flynn Downes in midfield. After captaining the side in a goalless draw against Gillingham, which saw Ipswich go winless in six matches and drop out of first place around the turn of the year, Skuse was dropped from the side by manager Lambert and replaced by Emyr Huws. He made his first start in seven matches against Peterborough on 1 February. At the time of the suspension of the season due to the COVID-19 pandemic in England, Ipswich were on a run of four defeats and had fallen to 10th in the table. Skuse had made 25 starts and four substitute appearances in the league. He captained the side in both matches in the EFL Trophy after the group stage, which ended for Ipswich in Round 3 against Exeter. He also captained the side in the club's final match in the FA Cup that season, against Coventry in a second round replay, his only appearances in cup football that season.

With his contract expiring at the end of the season, Skuse signed a new one-year contract, with the option of an additional 12 months, on 18 May 2020, keeping him at the club until at least 2021. In October 2020, Skuse suffered a knee injury in training, with the injury expected to rule him of action for three months. After being out of action for five months due to injury, he made his first appearance of the season as a second-half substitute in a 1–0 home win over Plymouth Argyle on 13 March 2021. On 10 May 2021, Ipswich announced that Skuse would be leaving the club following the end of his contract, after making 278 appearances over 8 seasons with the club.

=== Colchester United ===
On 25 May 2021, Skuse joined Colchester United on a free transfer. He signed a two-year deal with the club. He made his debut for Colchester on 7 August 2021 in their 0–0 draw away at Carlisle United.

== Managerial career ==
=== Bury Town ===
On 12 May 2023, Skuse announced his retirement from football to become manager of Isthmian League North club Bury Town.

On 3 May 2025, Skuse guided the club to promotion to the Isthmian League Premier .

== Career statistics ==
As of match played 8 May 2023

Appearances and goals by club, season and competition
Club	Season	League			FA Cup		League Cup		Other		Total	
Club	Season	Division	Apps	Goals	Apps	Goals	Apps	Goals	Apps	Goals	Apps	Goals
Bristol City	2004–05	League One	7	0	0	0	0	0	0	0	7	0
Bristol City	2005–06	League One	38	2	1	0	1	0	1 (Note: Appearance(s) in Football League Trophy)	0	41	2
Bristol City	2006–07	League One	42	0	5	0	1	0	4	0	52	0
Bristol City	2007–08	Championship	25	0	0	0	1	0	0	0	26	0
Bristol City	2008–09	Championship	33	2	2	0	2	0	—		37	2
Bristol City	2009–10	Championship	43	2	2	0	2	0	—		47	2
Bristol City	2010–11	Championship	30	1	1	0	1	0	—		32	1
Bristol City	2011–12	Championship	36	2	1	0	1	0	—		38	2
Bristol City	2012–13	Championship	25	0	1	0	1	0	—		27	0
Bristol City	Total		279	9	13	0	10	0	5	0	307	9
Ipswich Town	2013–14	Championship	43	0	0	0	1	0	—		44	0
Ipswich Town	2014–15	Championship	40	1	1	0	0	0	2 (Note: Appearances in Championship play-offs)	0	43	1
Ipswich Town	2015–16	Championship	39	0	1	0	0	0	—		40	0
Ipswich Town	2016–17	Championship	40	0	1	0	0	0	—		41	0
Ipswich Town	2017–18	Championship	39	1	0	0	1	0	—		40	1
Ipswich Town	2018–19	Championship	34	0	0	0	0	0	—		34	0
Ipswich Town	2019–20	League One	29	0	1	0	0	0	2 (Note: Appearances in EFL Trophy)	0	32	0
Ipswich Town	2020–21	League One	4	0	0	0	0	0	0	0	4	0
Ipswich Town	Total		268	2	4	0	2	0	4	0	278	2
Colchester United	2021–22	League Two	41	0	2	0	1	0	2	0	46	0
Colchester United	2022–23	League Two	27	1	0	0	2	0	0	0	29	1
Colchester United	Total		68	1	2	0	3	0	2	0	75	1
Career total			615	12	19	0	15	0	11	0	660	12

== Honours ==
Bristol City

- Football League One runner-up: 2006–07

Individual

- Bristol City Player of the Year: 2009–10
- Ipswich Town Goal of the Season: 2014–15
