= 2019–20 Ipswich Town F.C. season =

Ipswich Town
2019–20 season
- Owner: Marcus Evans
- Manager: Paul Lambert
- Stadium: Portman Road
- EFL League One: 11th
- FA Cup: Second round
- EFL Cup: First round
- EFL Trophy: Third round
- Top goalscorer: League: Kayden Jackson / James Norwood (11); All: Kayden Jackson / James Norwood (11)
- Highest home attendance: 24,051 (vs Sunderland, 10 August 2019, EFL League One)
- Lowest home attendance: 5,271 (vs Gillingham, 8 October 2019, EFL Trophy)
- Average home league attendance: 19,549
Home colours	Away colours

The 2019–20 season was Ipswich Town's first season back in the third tier of English football after relegation in the 2018–19 season and 142nd year in existence. Along with competing in EFL League One, the club also participated in the FA Cup, EFL Cup and EFL Trophy. The season covers the period from 1 July 2019 to 30 June 2020.

On 1 January 2020, Paul Lambert signed a new 5-year contract with the club until 2025.

On 13 March the season was suspended due to the COVID-19 pandemic. The season ultimately never resumed, and the final table was determined on a points-per-game basis after the club's voted to end the season on 9 June 2020.

== Season summary ==
=== Pre-season ===
The 2019–20 season saw Ipswich compete in the third tier of English football for the first time since 1957. Ipswich started the 2019–20 season as one of the promotion favorites following relegation from the EFL Championship in the 2018–19 season. The club's pre-season began in Germany with a 12-day training camp from 4 to 15 July. After returning from Germany Ipswich scheduled pre-season friendlies with a number of English sides. New signings including Tomáš Holý and James Norwood saw a change to the first-team squad, following the departure of a number of first team players at the end of the previous season.

=== August to December ===
The season began on the 3 August, with Ipswich traveling away to face Burton Albion at the Pirelli Stadium. Ipswich made a positive start to the season with a 1–0 victory in the season opener away at Burton. The following week saw Ipswich host Sunderland in the club's first home game of the season at Portman Road. After being in control for the majority of the game Ipswich conceded a second-half equalizer to cancel out a first-half goal from new loan signing Luke Garbutt, drawing the game 1–1. Ipswich exited the EFL Cup in the first round, following a 1–3 away loss to Luton Town on 13 August. Ipswich began the season in exceptional form, going on an eleven-game unbeaten run during the first quarter of the season, reaching the top of the table following a 5–0 win away at Bolton Wanderers on 24 August. Ipswich went the first two months of the season unbeaten in the league, with a 1–0 win away at Fleetwood Town keeping the team top of the league going into the first international break of the season, while manager Paul Lambert also won the EFL League One Manager of the Month award for August. Ipswich suffered their first defeat of the season after returning from the international break, suffering a 0–2 away loss to Accrington Stanley. A first home defeat of the season against Rotherham United saw a stutter in form, although back-to-back away wins over Southend United and Rochdale kept Ipswich top of the division going into November. Summer signing Kane Vincent-Young picked up a groin injury during the win away at Fleetwood, which forced him to leave the field. Despite early expectation that the injury would be minor, it was announced that Vincent-Young would require surgery on the injury, ruling him out for an estimated three months. Ipswich began their 2019–20 FA Cup campaign on 9 November after being drawn at home to divisional rivals Lincoln City, with the first-round match ending in a 1–1 draw, setting up a replay as a result. The replay took place on 20 November at Sincil Bank. A 94th-minute winner from Alan Judge saw Ipswich win their first FA Cup match since January 2010. Ipswich were drawn away at Coventry City in the second round, which was scheduled to take place on 3 December.

Ipswich suffered from a poor run of form over November and December, starting with a 2–2 draw at home to Blackpool followed by a 0–0 draw with then league leaders Wycombe Wanderers, with a goal by Ipswich captain Luke Chambers being controversially ruled out for offside. Ipswich did however progress in the EFL Trophy, with the 2019–20 season being the first time Ipswich had entered the competition in the club's history. After finishing second in the group stage, Ipswich were drawn away to Peterborough United on 4 December. Ipswich progressed into the third round after beating Peterborough 6–5 on penalties following a 1–1 draw, with debutante Adam Przybek saving two penalties in the shoot-out. Despite progression in the EFL Trophy, the poor league run continued as Ipswich failed to win in eight consecutive league games from mid November to New Year's Day, including an FA Cup exit to Coventry City on 10 December following a replay after a 1–1 draw. Ipswich also exited the EFL Trophy in the third round, following a 1–2 away loss to Exeter City.

=== January to March ===
Despite the poor run of results, on 1 January it was announced that Paul Lambert had signed a four-year contract extension with the club, extending his contract until 2025. Ipswich's next league win did not come until 11 January, with a 4–1 win at home to Accrington Stanley. January saw an upturn in form, with a draw away at Oxford United being followed by a 2–1 away win over Tranmere Rovers at Prenton Park, in which Ipswich came from behind in the second half to win the match. The following match saw Ipswich beat Lincoln City 1–0 at Portman Road, returning Ipswich to the top of the League One table for the first time since November. The following league match was a top of the table clash between Ipswich and second-placed Rotherham United. Ipswich suffered a 0–1 defeat at the New York Stadium. The following run saw a huge decline in results for Ipswich, defeats to promotion rivals Peterborough United and Sunderland followed by a 0–0 draw away to AFC Wimbledon. Ipswich suffered another injury blow on 21 February, when it was announced that James Norwood would require surgery on an adductor injury, adding to long term first-team injuries to Kane Vincent-Young, Danny Rowe, Jack Lankester and Tristan Nydam. A 4–1 win at home to Burton Albion followed four league defeats in a row to see Ipswich drop to 10th in the table, after being in the top six of the league from August through to February.

=== Season postponement ===
On 13 March the season was suspended due to the COVID-19 pandemic. After months of uncertainty, it was announced on 9 June that the season would ultimately not resume, with the final league table being determined on a points-per-game basis after the League One club's voting to end the season. Ipswich dropped a further place to 11th in League One, representing the club's lowest league finish since the 1952–53 season.

== Kits ==
Supplier: Adidas / Sponsor: Magical Vegas (chest), East Anglian Air Ambulance (back), Nicholas Estates (shorts)

Home	Away	Away alt.1	Away alt.2	Away alt.3

== First-team squad ==
Age listed below are accurate as of 4 May 2020

Number	Position(s)	Nationality	Name	Age
Goalkeepers
1	GK	(Czech Republic)	Tomáš Holý	10 December 1991 (aged 28)
12	GK	(England)	Will Norris	12 August 1993 (aged 26)
Defenders
2	CB / RB / LB	(Saint Lucia)	Janoi Donacien	3 November 1993 (aged 26)
3	LB / CB	(England)	Josh Earl	24 October 1998 (aged 21)
4	CB	(England)	Luke Chambers (C)	28 September 1985 (aged 34)
5	CB	(Wales)	James Wilson	26 February 1989 (aged 31)
24	RB / LB	(England)	Kane Vincent-Young	15 March 1996 (aged 24)
28	CB / RB	(England)	Luke Woolfenden	21 October 1998 (aged 21)
29	LB / LW	(England)	Luke Garbutt	21 May 1993 (aged 26)
30	LB	(England)	Myles Kenlock	26 November 1996 (aged 23)
Midfielders
7	RW / LW	(Wales)	Gwion Edwards	1 March 1993 (aged 27)
8	DM	(England)	Cole Skuse (VC)	29 March 1986 (aged 34)
11	CM	(England)	Jon Nolan	22 April 1992 (aged 28)
14	RW / LW / AM / SS	(England)	Jack Lankester	19 January 2000 (aged 20)
15	CM	(England)	Teddy Bishop	15 July 1996 (aged 23)
16	CM / LB	(England)	Tristan Nydam	6 November 1999 (aged 20)
17	LW / RW / AM	(England)	Danny Rowe	1 June 1992 (aged 27)
18	AM / LW / RW	(Republic of Ireland)	Alan Judge	11 November 1988 (aged 31)
21	CM / DM	(England)	Flynn Downes	20 January 1999 (aged 21)
23	CM	(England)	Andre Dozzell	2 May 1999 (aged 21)
36	AM / RW / LW	(Albania)	Armando Dobra	14 April 2001 (aged 19)
44	CM	(Wales)	Emyr Huws	30 September 1993 (aged 26)
Forwards
9	CF	(England)	Kayden Jackson	22 February 1994 (aged 26)
10	CF	(England)	James Norwood	5 September 1990 (aged 29)
20	SS / LW / CF	(England)	Freddie Sears	27 November 1989 (aged 30)
48	CF	(England)	Will Keane	11 January 1993 (aged 27)
Players transferred/loaned out during the season
19	LW / CF	(England)	Jordan Roberts	5 January 1994 (aged 26)
22	CB	(Democratic Republic of the Congo)	Aristote Nsiala	25 March 1992 (aged 28)
26	AM / CM	(Tunisia)	Idris El Mizouni	26 September 2000 (aged 19)
27	RB	(England)	Josh Emmanuel	18 August 1997 (aged 22)
38	LW / LB	(Cyprus)	Anthony Georgiou	24 February 1997 (aged 23)

== First-team coaching staff ==
Position	Name
Manager	(Scotland) Paul Lambert
Assistant manager	(Scotland) Stuart Taylor
First-team Coach	(England) Matt Gill
Goalkeeping coach	(England) Jimmy Walker
Head of Athletic Performance & Sports Science	(Scotland) Jim Henry
Strength & conditioning Coach	(England) Tom Walsh
Head physiotherapist	(England) Matt Byard
Assistant Head Physiotherapist	(England) Alex Chapman
Head of performance Analysis	(England) Will Stephenson
First-team Assistant Analyst	(England) George Buckley
Recruitment Analyst	(England) Alex Hood
Kitman	(England) James Pullen

== Pre-season ==
The club's pre-season schedule was confirmed in June 2019. The club's pre-season schedule also included a 12-day training camp in Germany, from 4 to 15 July.

=== Friendlies ===
6 July 2019 Friendly	SC Paderborn 07	3–2	Ipswich Town	Delbrück, Germany
15:00 CET	Pröger 8'; Guèye 18', 34'	Report	Roberts 36'; Jackson 76' (pen.)	Stadium: Stadion Laumeskamp

19 July 2019 Friendly	Colchester United	0–5	Ipswich Town	Colchester, England
19:30 BST		Report	Norwood 17' (pen.), 62', 71'; Jackson 47', 73'	Stadium: Colchester Community Stadium

23 July 2019 Friendly	Notts County	1–1	Ipswich Town	Nottingham, England
19:00 BST	Tyson 41'	Report	Jackson 67'	Stadium: Meadow Lane

27 July 2019 Friendly	Cambridge United	0–0	Ipswich Town	Cambridge, England
13:00 BST		Report		Stadium: Abbey Stadium

=== Interwetten Cup ===
The Interwetten Cup is a four team pre-season friendly tournament hosted by German side SV Meppen at their home ground, the Hänsch-Arena in Meppen, Germany. The tournament features four teams, including hosts SV Meppen, with teams playing 45 minute semi-finals, with the winner of each semi-final progressing into another 45 minute final. The two losing teams then take part in a 45-minute 3rd place play-off to decide the final position for each team. The teams competing in the 2019 Interwetten Cup included Ipswich Town, Fortuna Düsseldorf, SV Meppen and FC Utrecht. The two semi-finals featured Fortuna Düsseldorf against Ipswich Town, with Fortuna emerging 4–1 winners, and SV Meppen against FC Utrecht, with Utrecht winning 5–4 on penalties, after the semi-final match finished in a 0–0 draw. The final of the tournament was contested by FC Utrecht and Fortuna Düsseldorf, with Utrecht winning the Interwetten Cup following a 1–0 win over Fortuna in the tournament final. Hosts SV Meppen finished third following a 3–1 penalty shootout win over Ipswich Town, after the 3rd place play-off match finished in a 0–0 draw.

14 July 2019 Interwetten Cup Semi-finals	Fortuna Düsseldorf	4–1	Ipswich Town	Meppen, Germany
14:00 CET	Fink 3'; Thommy 10', 14'; Tekpetey 27'	Report	Norwood 4'	Stadium: Hänsch-Arena

14 July 2019 Interwetten Cup 3rd place play-off	SV Meppen	0–0 (3–1 p)	Ipswich Town	Meppen, Germany
15:00 CET		Report		Stadium: Hänsch-Arena
	Penalties
	Vidović (penalty scored); El-Helwe (penalty scored); Komenda (penalty scored)		Jackson (penalty scored); Dozzell (penalty missed); Chambers (penalty missed); Roberts (penalty missed)

== Competitions ==
=== EFL League One ===
==== League table ====
Pos	Team	Pld	W	D	L	GF	GA	GD	Pts	PPG
7	Peterborough United	35	17	8	10	68	40	+28	59	1.69
8	Sunderland	36	16	11	9	48	32	+16	59	1.64
9	Doncaster Rovers	34	15	9	10	51	33	+18	54	1.59
10	Gillingham	35	12	15	8	42	34	+8	51	1.46
11	Ipswich Town	36	14	10	12	46	36	+10	52	1.44
12	Burton Albion	35	12	12	11	50	50	0	48	1.37
13	Blackpool	35	11	12	12	44	43	+1	45	1.29
14	Bristol Rovers	35	12	9	14	38	49	−11	45	1.29
15	Shrewsbury Town	34	10	11	13	31	42	−11	41	1.21

Source: EFL Official Website
Rules for classification: 1) Points per game; 2) Goal difference; 3) Number of goals scored; 4) Head-to-head results; 5) Wins; 6) Away goals; 7) Penalty points (sec 9.5); 8) 12-point sending-off offences

==== Results summary ====
Overall								Home						Away					
Pld	W	D	L	GF	GA	GD	Pts	W	D	L	GF	GA	GD	W	D	L	GF	GA	GD
36	14	10	12	46	36	+10	52	6	5	6	23	18	+5	8	5	6	23	18	+5

Last updated: 7 March 2020.
Source: BBC

==== Results by matchday ====
Matchday	1	2	3	4	5	6	7	8	9	10	11	12	13	14	15	16	17	18	19	20	21	22	23	24	25	26	27	28	29	30	31	32	33	34	35	36	37	38	39	40	41	42	43	44	45
Ground	A	H	A	H	A	H	H	A	A	H	A	A	H	A	A	H	H	A	H	A	H	A	A	H	A	A	H	A	H	A	A	H	H	A	H	A	H	H	H	A	H	A	H	A	H
Result	W	D	D	W	W	W	D	W	W	W	W	L	L	W	W	D	D	D	L	L	D	L	D	W	D	W	W	L	L	L	D	W	L	L	L	L									
Position	8	6	8	5	1	1	2	2	1	1	1	1	2	1	1	2	2	2	2	3	2	4	5	3	3	3	1	3	4	7	7	7	8	9	9	10									

Updated to match(es) played on 7 March 2020. Source: Statto.com
A = Away; H = Home; W = Win; D = Draw; L = Loss

==== Matches ====
3 August 2019 1	Burton Albion	0–1	Ipswich Town	Burton upon Trent
15:00 BST	Quinn (yellow card) 27' (yellow-red card) 78'; Edwards (yellow card) 36'; Fraser (yellow card) 90+2'	Report	Garbutt 11'; Norwood (yellow card) 53'; Downes (yellow card) 58'; Judge (yellow card) 88'	Stadium: Pirelli Stadium; Attendance: 4,565; Referee: Ross Joyce

10 August 2019 2	Ipswich Town	1–1	Sunderland	Ipswich
15:00 BST	Jackson (yellow card) 6'; Garbutt 15'	Report	Dobson (yellow card) 61'; Gooch 64'	Stadium: Portman Road; Attendance: 24,051; Referee: Neil Hair

17 August 2019 3	Peterborough United	2–2	Ipswich Town	Peterborough
15:00 BST	Toney 29'; Eisa 62'; Kent (yellow card) 65'; Knight (yellow card) 73'; Mason (yellow card) 90'	Report	Norwood 4' (penalty missed) 66'; Kenlock (yellow card) 73'; Chambers 90+4'	Stadium: London Road Stadium; Attendance: 10,071; Referee: Martin Coy

20 August 2019 4	Ipswich Town	2–1	AFC Wimbledon	Ipswich
19:45 BST	Donacien (yellow card) 47'; Norwood 81'; Jackson 90+4'	Report	Guinness-Walker 41'; O'Neill (yellow card) 50'; Kalambayi (yellow card) 63'; Wagstaff (yellow card) 81'; Pigott (yellow card) 90+4'	Stadium: Portman Road; Attendance: 18,778; Referee: Antony Coggins

24 August 2019 5	Bolton Wanderers	0–5	Ipswich Town	Bolton
15:00 BST	Brockbank (yellow card) 19'	Report	Norwood 19' (pen.), 72'; Edwards 50' (yellow card) 69'; Jackson 60', 64'	Stadium: University of Bolton Stadium; Attendance: 5,454; Referee: Kevin Johnson

31 August 2019 6	Ipswich Town	3–0	Shrewsbury Town	Ipswich
15:00 BST	Jackson 2'; Norwood 10' (pen.); Downes 69' (yellow card) 87'	Report	Whalley (yellow card) 5' (yellow-red card) 38'; Love (yellow card) 38'; Pierre (yellow card) 76'; Goss (yellow card) 85'	Stadium: Portman Road; Attendance: 19,161; Referee: Trevor Kettle

14 September 2019 7	Ipswich Town	0–0	Doncaster Rovers	Ipswich
15:00 BST	Downes (yellow card) 47'	Report	James (yellow card) 35'; Sheaf (yellow card) 62'; Whiteman (yellow card) 65'; Coppinger (yellow card) 69'; Halliday (yellow card) 82'	Stadium: Portman Road; Attendance: 18,928; Referee: Ollie Yates

17 September 2019 8	Milton Keynes Dons	0–1	Ipswich Town	Milton Keynes
19:45 BST	Poole (yellow card) 58'	Report	Nolan 12'; Huws (yellow card) 58'; Downes (yellow card) 90+2'	Stadium: Stadium MK; Attendance: 10,167; Referee: Lee Swabey

21 September 2019 9	Gillingham	0–1	Ipswich Town	Gillingham
15:00 BST	Byrne (yellow card) 43'	Report	Vincent-Young 32'; Wilson (yellow card) 87'; Judge (yellow card) 90'	Stadium: Priestfield Stadium; Attendance: 7,214; Referee: Chris Sarginson

28 September 2019 10	Ipswich Town	4–1	Tranmere Rovers	Ipswich
15:00 BST	Garbutt 35'; Jackson 48'; Nolan 62'; Norwood (yellow card) 68'; Vincent-Young 70'	Report	Payne 39' (yellow card) 47'; Potter (yellow card) 33'	Stadium: Portman Road; Attendance: 19,785; Referee: Ben Toner

5 October 2019 11	Fleetwood Town	0–1	Ipswich Town	Fleetwood
15:00 BST	Coutts (yellow card) 21'; Evans (yellow card) 72'; Andrew (yellow card) 74'; Dunne (yellow card) 88'	Report	Norwood (yellow card) 20'; Skuse (yellow card) 43'; Wilson (yellow card) 50' (yellow-red card) 90+3'; Jackson 58' (penalty missed) 87'; Edwards (yellow card) 74'; Nolan (yellow card) 90+5'	Stadium: Highbury Stadium; Attendance: 4,312; Referee: Carl Boyeson

20 October 2019 12	Accrington Stanley	2–0	Ipswich Town	Accrington
12:00 BST	Bishop 17', 41' (pen.); Opoku (yellow card) 49'; McConville (yellow card) 74'; Sykes (red card) 78'	Report	Nsiala (yellow card) 19'; Edwards (yellow card) 45'; Nolan (yellow card) 59'; Dobra (yellow card) 72' (red card) 79'	Stadium: Wham Stadium; Attendance: 3,567; Referee: Sebastian Stockbridge

23 October 2019 13	Ipswich Town	0–2	Rotherham United	Ipswich
19:45 BST	Edwards (yellow card) 78'	Report	Crooks 11', 48'; Clarke (yellow card) 29'; Jones (yellow card) 43'; Mattock (yellow card) 76'	Stadium: Portman Road; Attendance: 20,550; Referee: John Busby

26 October 2019 14	Southend United	1–3	Ipswich Town	Southend-on-Sea
15:00 BST	Humphrys (yellow card) 38'; Cox (yellow card) 75'; Acquah 83'	Report	Norwood 8', 70'; Downes (yellow card) 10'; Jackson (yellow card) 48' (goal) 76'	Stadium: Roots Hall; Attendance: 8,632; Referee: Andy Davies

5 November 2019 15	Rochdale	0–1	Ipswich Town	Rochdale
19:45 BST		Report	Norwood (yellow card) 43'; Rowe 53'	Stadium: Spotland Stadium; Attendance: 3,150; Referee: Scott Oldham

23 November 2019 16	Ipswich Town	2–2	Blackpool	Ipswich
15:00 GMT	Edwards 8'; Garbutt 58' (pen.)	Report	Nuttall 22'; Spearing 53' (pen.), (yellow card) 90'; Edwards (yellow card) 69'	Stadium: Portman Road; Attendance: 19,503; Referee: Steve Martin

26 November 2019 17	Ipswich Town	0–0	Wycombe Wanderers	Ipswich
19:45 BST	Nolan (yellow card) 31'; Garbutt (yellow card) 34'; Norwood (yellow card) 44'; Donacien (yellow card) 45+4'; Woolfenden (yellow card) 81'	Report	Smyth (yellow card) 45+1'; Stewart (yellow card) 61'; Allsop (yellow card) 79'; Thompson (yellow card) 83'; Jacobson (penalty missed) 87'; Kashket (yellow card) 87'; Akinfenwa (yellow card) 90+2'	Stadium: Portman Road; Attendance: 19,215; Referee: Alan Young

7 December 2019 18	Coventry City	1–1	Ipswich Town	Birmingham
15:00 BST	Biamou 56'; Kastaneer (yellow card) 59'	Report	Keane 31'; Edwards (yellow card) 59'; Woolfenden (yellow card) 76'; Jackson (yellow card) 90+2'	Stadium: St Andrew’s; Attendance: 8,085; Referee: Darren Drysdale

14 December 2019 19	Ipswich Town	1–2	Bristol Rovers	Ipswich
15:00 BST	Norwood 37'; Downes (yellow card) 45+1'; Woolfenden (yellow card) 51'	Report	Smith 4'; Nichols 23'; Upson (yellow card) 14'; Clarke (yellow card) 45+1' (yellow-red card) 77'; Jaakkola (yellow card) 49'	Stadium: Portman Road; Attendance: 18,806; Referee: James Adcock

21 December 2019 20	Portsmouth	1–0	Ipswich Town	Milton
15:00 GMT	Harrison (yellow card) 1'; Burgess (yellow card) 32'; Curtis 50'; Williams (yellow card) 84'	Report	Nsiala (yellow card) 7'; Edwards (yellow card) 28'; Chambers (yellow card) 56' (yellow-red card) 88'; Nolan (yellow card) 62'; Woolfenden (yellow card) 88'; Jackson (yellow card) 90+2'	Stadium: Fratton Park; Attendance: 18,801; Referee: Brett Huxtable

26 December 2019 21	Ipswich Town	0–0	Gillingham	Ipswich
15:00 BST	Norwood (yellow card) 27'; Nsiala (yellow card) 45+2'; Judge (yellow card) 90+1'; Edwards (yellow card) 90+2'	Report	Tucker (yellow card) 90+3'	Stadium: Portman Road; Attendance: 22,082; Referee: Craig Hicks

29 December 2019 22	Lincoln City	5−3	Ipswich Town	Lincoln
15:00 BST	Anderson 6'; Walker 45+2', 72'; Bostwick (yellow card) 45+1' (goal) 79'; Hesketh 90+2'; Vickers (yellow card) 90+4'	Report	Garbutt 32'; Edwards (yellow card) 43'; Sears (yellow card) 47'; Dozzell (yellow card) 48'; Toffolo 59' (o.g.); Keane 83'	Stadium: Sincil Bank; Attendance: 10,012; Referee: James Oldham

1 January 2020 23	Wycombe Wanderers	1–1	Ipswich Town	High Wycombe
15:00 BST	Wheeler 66'	Report	Norwood 54'; Wilson (yellow card) 35'; Woolfenden (yellow card) 78'	Stadium: Adams Park; Attendance: 8,523; Referee: Robert Lewis

11 January 2020 24	Ipswich Town	4–1	Accrington Stanley	Ipswich
15:00 BST	Jackson 12'; Norwood 29'; Judge 44'; Keane 90+2'; Chambers (yellow card) 90+4'	Report	Zanzala 86' (pen.); Alese (yellow card) 72'	Stadium: Portman Road; Attendance: 17,536; Referee: Charles Breakspear

14 January 2020 25	Oxford United	0–0	Ipswich Town	Oxford
19:45 GMT	Browne (yellow card) 72'	Report	Edwards (yellow card) 63'	Stadium: The Kassam Stadium; Attendance: 8,191; Referee: Tom Nield

18 January 2020 26	Tranmere Rovers	1–2	Ipswich Town	Birkenhead
15:00 BST	Monthé 32' (yellow card) 71'; Perkins (yellow card) 36'; Danns (yellow card) 65'	Report	Norris (yellow card) 32'; Downes 55'; Huws (yellow card) 68'; Jackson 79'	Stadium: Prenton Park; Attendance: 7,921; Referee: John Busby

25 January 2020 27	Ipswich Town	1–0	Lincoln City	Ipswich
15:00 BST	Woolfenden (yellow card) 41' (goal) 44'; Huws (yellow card) 71'; Downes (yellow card) 88'	Report	Morrell (yellow card) 40'; Bolger (yellow card) 69'	Stadium: Portman Road; Attendance: 18,795; Referee: Lee Swabey

28 January 2020 28	Rotherham United	1–0	Ipswich Town	Rotherham
15:00 BST	Wood 42'; Morrell (yellow card) 37'; Mattock (yellow card) 83'	Report	Huws (yellow card) 43'; Woolfenden (yellow card) 78'	Stadium: New York Stadium; Attendance: 9,327; Referee: Antony Coggins

1 February 2020 29	Ipswich Town	1–4	Peterborough United	Ipswich
15:00 BST	Edwards (yellow card) 77'; Norwood 79' (pen.); Skuse (yellow card) 90+3'	Report	Toney 23' (pen.); Szmodics 33', 74'; Dembélé 50'; Butler (yellow card) 65'; Knight (yellow card) 67'	Stadium: Portman Road; Attendance: 21,351; Referee: Andy Woolmer

8 February 2020 30	Sunderland	1–0	Ipswich Town	Sunderland
15:00 BST	O'Nien (yellow card) 21'; Flanagan (yellow card) 75'; Maguire 81'	Report	Downes (yellow card) 23'; Chambers (yellow card) 54'	Stadium: Stadium of Light; Attendance: 32,726; Referee: Jeremy Simpson

11 February 2020 31	AFC Wimbledon	0–0	Ipswich Town	Norbiton
19:45 BST	Reilly (yellow card) 39'	Report	Downes (yellow card) 69'	Stadium: Kingsmeadow; Attendance: 4,745; Referee: Craig Hicks

15 February 2020 32	Ipswich Town	4–1	Burton Albion	Ipswich
15:00 BST	Garbutt (yellow card) 23'; Judge 29', 63'; Jackson 45+1', 52'; Nolan (yellow card) 67'	Report	Murphy 6'	Stadium: Portman Road; Attendance: 19,922; Referee: Charles Breakspear

22 February 2020 33	Ipswich Town	0–1	Oxford United	Ipswich
15:00 BST	Garbutt (yellow card) 38'; Jackson (red card) 90+3'; Woolfenden (yellow card) 90+4'	Report	Taylor 44'; Browne (yellow card) 64'	Stadium: Portman Road; Attendance: 19,363; Referee: Scott Oldham

29 February 2020 33	Blackpool	2–1	Ipswich Town	Blackpool
15:00 GMT	Dewsbury-Hall 26', (yellow card) 81'; Macdonald (yellow card) 86'; Nuttall 90+3' (yellow card) 90+3'	Report	Sears 54'; Downes (yellow card) 59'	Stadium: Bloomfield Road; Attendance: 9,500; Referee: Chris Sarginson

3 March 2020 35	Ipswich Town	0–1	Fleetwood Town	Ipswich
19:45 BST	Chambers (yellow card) 66'	Report	Evans 40'; Madden (yellow card) 70'	Stadium: Portman Road; Attendance: 15,678; Referee: Neil Hair

7 March 2020 36	Ipswich Town	0–1	Coventry City	Ipswich
15:00 BST	Norris (yellow card) 45+3'; Sears (yellow card) 62'; Dozzell (yellow card) 76'	Report	Godden 16'; Walsh (yellow card) 30'; McFadzean (yellow card) 59'; McCallum (yellow card) 90+1'	Stadium: Portman Road; Attendance: 18,825; Referee: Trevor Kettle

14 March 2020 37	Bristol Rovers	v	Ipswich Town	Horfield
15:00 GMT				Stadium: Memorial Stadium
Note: Season was suspended due to the COVID-19 pandemic.

21 March 2020 38	Ipswich Town	v	Portsmouth	Ipswich
15:00 GMT				Stadium: Portman Road
Note: Season was suspended due to the COVID-19 pandemic.

4 April 2020 39	Ipswich Town	v	Southend United	Ipswich
15:00 BST				Stadium: Portman Road
Note: Season was suspended due to the COVID-19 pandemic.

10 April 2020 40	Ipswich Town	v	Bolton Wanderers	Ipswich
15:00 BST				Stadium: Portman Road
Note: Season was suspended due to the COVID-19 pandemic.

13 April 2020 41	Shrewsbury Town	v	Ipswich Town	Shrewsbury
15:00 BST				Stadium: New Meadow
Note: Season was suspended due to the COVID-19 pandemic.

18 April 2020 42	Ipswich Town	v	Rochdale	Ipswich
15:00 BST				Stadium: Portman Road
Note: Season was suspended due to the COVID-19 pandemic.

25 April 2020 43	Doncaster Rovers	v	Ipswich Town	Doncaster
15:00 BST				Stadium: Keepmoat Stadium
Note: Season was suspended due to the COVID-19 pandemic.

3 May 2020 44	Ipswich Town	v	MK Dons	Ipswich
15:00 BST				Stadium: Portman Road
Note: Season was suspended due to the COVID-19 pandemic.

=== FA Cup ===
The first round draw was made on 21 October 2019. The second round draw was made live on 11 November from Chichester City's stadium, Oaklands Park.

9 November 2019 First round	Ipswich Town	1–1	Lincoln City	Ipswich
15:00 BST	Dobra (yellow card) 33'; Downes (yellow card) 45'; Dozzell 79'	Report	Hesketh (yellow card) 30'; Walker 37' (penalty missed) 74'	Stadium: Portman Road; Attendance: 11,598; Referee: Kevin Johnson

20 November 2019 First round replay	Lincoln City	0–1	Ipswich Town	Lincoln
19:45 GMT		Report	Donacien (yellow card) 26'; Judge 90+4'	Stadium: Sincil Bank; Attendance: 6,781; Referee: Andy Haines

1 December 2019 Second round	Coventry City	1–1	Ipswich Town	Birmingham
14:00 GMT	Walsh (yellow card) 79'; O'Hare 90+4'	Report	Keane 51'; Dozzell (yellow card) 67'; Downes (yellow card) 81'	Stadium: St Andrew's; Attendance: 2,878; Referee: Anthony Backhouse

10 December 2019 Second round replay	Ipswich Town	1–2	Coventry City	Ipswich
19:45 GMT	Garbutt 84'	Report	Shipley 18'; Biamou 33'	Stadium: Portman Road; Attendance: 6,515; Referee: Chris Sarginson

=== EFL Cup ===
The first round draw was made on 20 June 2019.

13 August 2019 First round	Luton Town	3–1	Ipswich Town	Luton
19:45 BST	Jones 8'; Lee 17' (pen.), (yellow card) 85'; Shinnie 55'	Report	Dobra 74', (yellow card) 85'; Judge (yellow card) 56'; Roberts (yellow card) 79'; Emmanuel (yellow card) 90'	Stadium: Kenilworth Road; Attendance: 5,435; Referee: Brett Huxtable

=== EFL Trophy ===
On 9 July 2019, the pre-determined group stage draw was announced with Invited clubs to be drawn on 12 July 2019. The draw for the second round was made on 16 November 2019 live on Sky Sports. The draw for the third round was made on 5 December 2019 live on Sky Sports.

==== Group stage ====
Pos	Div	Team	Pld	W	PW	PL	L	GF	GA	GD	Pts	Qualification
1	L2	Colchester United	3	2	0	1	0	5	3	+2	7	Advance to Round 2
2	L1	Ipswich Town	3	2	0	0	1	6	2	+4	6	Advance to Round 2
3	L1	Gillingham	3	1	0	0	2	4	7	−3	3	
4	ACA	Tottenham Hotspur U21	3	0	1	0	2	2	5	−3	2	

Source: EFL.com

3 September 2019 Group A	Ipswich Town	2–1	Tottenham Hotspur U21	Ipswich
19:45 BST	Roberts 47', 66'	Report	Shashoua 8'; Okedina (yellow card) 77'	Stadium: Portman Road; Attendance: 5,377; Referee: Craig Hicks

8 October 2019 Group A	Ipswich Town	4–0	Gillingham	Ipswich
19:45 BST	Huws 8' (yellow card) 67'; Roberts 21'; Mandron 61' (o.g.); Keane 87'	Report	Mandron (yellow card) 21'; Woods (yellow card) 26'	Stadium: Portman Road; Attendance: 5,271; Referee: Tom Nield

12 November 2019 Group A	Colchester United	1–0	Ipswich Town	Colchester
19:30 BST	Norris (yellow card) 35'; Sowunmi (yellow card) 38'; Clampin 80'	Report	Wilson (yellow card) 45+3'	Stadium: Colchester Community Stadium; Attendance: 5,104; Referee: Sam Purkiss

==== Second round ====
4 December 2019 Second round	Peterborough United	1–1 (5–6 p)	Ipswich Town	Peterborough
19:30 GMT	Jones 32'; Tasdemir (yellow card) 37'; Butler (yellow card) 85'	Report	El Mizouni 23'; Smith (yellow card) 59'; Huws (yellow card) 71'; Roberts (yellow card) 85'	Stadium: Weston Homes Stadium; Attendance: 2,310; Referee: Graham Salisbury
	Penalties
	Eisa (penalty scored); Toney (penalty scored); Dembélé (penalty missed); Butler (penalty scored); Mason (penalty scored); Barker (penalty scored); Kent (penalty missed)		Roberts (penalty scored); McGavin (penalty missed); Kenlock (penalty scored); El Mizouni (penalty scored); Norwood (penalty scored); Huws (penalty scored); Cotter (penalty scored)

==== Third round ====
4 January 2020 Third round	Exeter City	2–1	Ipswich Town	Exeter
15:00 GMT	Jay (yellow card) 35'; Ajose 45'; Martin 90+3'	Report	Keane (yellow card) 41' (goal) 57'; Woolfenden (yellow card) 60'; Nsiala (yellow card) 90+1'	Stadium: St James Park; Attendance: 2,299; Referee: Josh Smith

== Transfers ==
=== Transfers in ===
Date	Position	Nationality	Name	From	Fee	Ref.
1 July 2019	GK	(Czech Republic)	Tomáš Holý	(England) Gillingham	Free transfer	
1 July 2019	GK	(Wales)	Adam Przybek	(England) West Bromwich Albion	Free transfer	
1 July 2019	CF	(England)	James Norwood	(England) Tranmere Rovers	Free transfer	
2 August 2019	CB	(Wales)	James Wilson	(England) Lincoln City	Free transfer	
19 August 2019	RB	(England)	Kane Vincent-Young	(England) Colchester United	£500,000	
20 August 2019	CF	(England)	Will Keane	(England) Hull City	Free transfer	
1 January 2020	DF	(Netherlands)	Levi Andoh	(England) Worcester City	Free transfer	

=== Loans in ===
Date from	Position	Nationality	Name	From	Date until	Ref.
12 July 2019	LB	(England)	Luke Garbutt	(England) Everton	30 June 2020	
30 July 2019	GK	(England)	Will Norris	(England) Wolverhampton Wanderers	30 June 2020	
19 August 2019	LM	(Cyprus)	Anthony Georgiou	(England) Tottenham Hotspur	28 December 2019	
13 January 2020	LB	(England)	Josh Earl	(England) Preston North End	4 May 2020	

=== Transfers out ===
Date	Position	Nationality	Name	To	Fee	Ref.
21 June 2019	CF	(Wales)	Ellis Harrison	(England) Portsmouth	Undisclosed (Note: Fee reported as £450,000)	
1 July 2019	CM	(England)	Tom Adeyemi	Free agent	Released	
1 July 2019	CB	(Wales)	James Collins	Free agent	Released	
1 July 2019	LW	(Jamaica)	Simon Dawkins	Free agent	Released	
1 July 2019	GK	(England)	Dean Gerken	(England) Colchester United	Free transfer	
1 July 2019	RB	(England)	Ashton Henry	Free agent	Released	
1 July 2019	LB	(Denmark)	Jonas Knudsen	(Sweden) Malmö	Free transfer	
1 July 2019	CB	(England)	Ross Marshall	(England) Maidstone United	Free transfer	
1 July 2019	LW	(Northern Ireland)	Conor McKendry	(Northern Ireland) Larne	Free transfer	
1 July 2019	MF	(Gibraltar)	Kian Ronan	(Gibraltar) Manchester 62	Free transfer	
1 July 2019	MF	(England)	Ryley Scott	Free agent	Released	
1 July 2019	MF	(England)	Henry Barley	(England) Felixstowe & Walton United	Free transfer	
1 July 2019	CB	(England)	Chris Smith	(England) King's Lynn Town	Free transfer	
1 July 2019	RB	(England)	Jordan Spence	Free agent	Released	
1 July 2019	CB	(England)	Luca Vega	(England) Charlton Athletic	Free transfer	
1 July 2019	RM	(England)	Grant Ward	Free agent	Released	
1 July 2019	GK	(England)	Mitchell Ware	Free agent	Released	
12 August 2019	LB	(England)	Patrick Webber	(England) Wigan Athletic	Free transfer	
2 September 2019	RB	(England)	Josh Emmanuel	(England) Bolton Wanderers	Free transfer	
27 January 2020	GK	(Poland)	Bartosz Białkowski	(England) Millwall	Undisclosed	

=== Loans out ===
Date from	Position	Nationality	Name	To	Date until	Ref.
30 July 2019	GK	(Poland)	Bartosz Białkowski	(England) Millwall	27 January 2020	
5 August 2019	GK	(England)	Toby Egan	(England) Haverhill Rovers	September 2019	
8 August 2019	CF	(Republic of Ireland)	Aaron Drinan	(Sweden) GAIS	1 January 2020	
17 August 2019	MF	(England)	Brett McGavin	(England) Concord Rangers	September 2019	
26 September 2019	RB	(Republic of Ireland)	Barry Cotter	(England) Chelmsford City	3 December 2019 (Note: On 31 October 2019, Cotter's loan spell was extended until 3 December 2019.)	
8 November 2019	CB	(Republic of Ireland)	Corrie Ndaba	(England) Hemel Hempstead Town	8 December 2019	
8 November 2019	LB	(England)	Bailey Clements	(England) Hemel Hempstead Town	8 December 2019	
30 November 2019	LB	(England)	Tommy Smith	(England) Bury Town	30 February 2020	
30 November 2019	CB	(England)	Alex Henderson	(England) Bury Town	30 February 2020	
6 December 2019	CB	(Republic of Ireland)	Corrie Ndaba	(England) Chelmsford City	6 January 2020	
9 January 2020	LW	(England)	Jordan Roberts	(England) Gillingham	6 May 2020	
9 January 2020	CF	(England)	Zak Brown	(England) Leiston	9 February 2020	
10 January 2020	CB	(Democratic Republic of the Congo)	Aristote Nsiala	(England) Bolton Wanderers	30 June 2020	
17 January 2020	CF	(Republic of Ireland)	Aaron Drinan	(Scotland) Ayr United	30 June 2020	
17 January 2020	FW	(England)	Kai Brown	(England) East Thurrock United	February 2020	
23 January 2020	MF	(Tunisia)	Idris El Mizouni	(England) Cambridge United	2 March 2020 (Note: On 2 March 2020, El Mizouni's loan spell was ended due to an injury.)	
25 January 2020	MF	(France)	Lounes Foudil	(England) Bury Town	25 February 2020	
31 January 2020	CF	(Australia)	Ben Folami	(England) Stevenage	30 June 2020	

=== New contracts ===
==== Coaching staff ====
Date signed	Nationality	Name	Contract length	Expiry	Ref.
1 January 2020	(Scotland)	Paul Lambert	5 years	2025	

==== Players ====
Date signed	Number	Position	Nationality	Name	Contract length	Expiry	Ref.
1 July 2019	–	CF	(England)	Zak Brown	2 years	2021	
17 July 2019	30	LB	(England)	Myles Kenlock	3 years	2022	
26 July 2019	–	RB	(England)	Dylan Crowe	3 years	2022	
31 July 2019	20	CF	(England)	Freddie Sears	2 years	2021	
24 October 2019	5	CB	(Wales)	James Wilson	18 Months	2021	
25 February 2020	53	LB	(England)	Tommy Smith	2 years	2022	
2 March 2020	47	CF	(England)	Tyreece Simpson	2 years	2022	
18 May 2020	8	DM	(England)	Cole Skuse	1 year	2021	
20 May 2020	36	AM	(Albania)	Armando Dobra	3 years	2023	

== Squad statistics ==
All statistics updated as of end of season

=== Appearances and goals ===
No.	Pos	Nat	Player	Total		League One		FA Cup		EFL Cup		EFL Trophy	
No.	Pos	Nat	Player	Apps	Goals	Apps	Goals	Apps	Goals	Apps	Goals	Apps	Goals
Goalkeepers
1	GK	(Czech Republic) CZE	Tomáš Holý	25	0	21	0	2	0	0	0	2	0
12	GK	(England) ENG	Will Norris	20	0	15	0	2	0	1	0	2	0
31	GK	(Wales) WAL	Adam Przybek	1	0	0	0	0	0	0	0	1	0
Defenders
2	DF	(Saint Lucia) LCA	Janoi Donacien	19	0	12+1	0	3	0	0	0	3	0
3	DF	(England) ENG	Josh Earl	7	0	5+2	0	0	0	0	0	0	0
4	DF	(England) ENG	Luke Chambers	32	1	31	1	0	0	1	0	0	0
5	DF	(Wales) WAL	James Wilson	31	0	21+2	0	3	0	1	0	4	0
24	DF	(England) ENG	Kane Vincent-Young	9	2	9	2	0	0	0	0	0	0
28	DF	(England) ENG	Luke Woolfenden	36	1	31	1	2	0	0	0	3	0
29	DF	(England) ENG	Luke Garbutt	30	6	28	5	1+1	1	0	0	0	0
30	DF	(England) ENG	Myles Kenlock	17	0	8+1	0	3	0	0	0	5	0
37	DF	(Republic of Ireland) IRL	Barry Cotter	2	0	0	0	1	0	0	0	1	0
46	DF	(England) ENG	Bailey Clements	1	0	0	0	0	0	1	0	0	0
52	DF	(England) ENG	Alex Henderson	1	0	0	0	0	0	0	0	1	0
53	DF	(England) ENG	Tommy Smith	1	0	0	0	0	0	0	0	0+1	0
Midfielders
7	MF	(Wales) WAL	Gwion Edwards	35	2	22+5	2	1+2	0	1	0	3+1	0
8	MF	(England) ENG	Cole Skuse	32	0	25+4	0	1	0	0	0	2	0
11	MF	(England) ENG	Jon Nolan	25	2	17+5	2	1+1	0	0	0	1	0
14	MF	(England) ENG	Jack Lankester	0	0	0	0	0	0	0	0	0	0
15	MF	(England) ENG	Teddy Bishop	10	0	2+7	0	0	0	0	0	1	0
16	MF	(England) ENG	Tristan Nydam	0	0	0	0	0	0	0	0	0	0
17	MF	(England) ENG	Danny Rowe	18	1	9+5	1	1+1	0	0+1	0	1	0
18	MF	(Republic of Ireland) IRL	Alan Judge	34	4	21+9	3	3	1	1	0	0	0
21	MF	(England) ENG	Flynn Downes	32	2	29	2	2	0	0+1	0	0	0
23	MF	(England) ENG	Andre Dozzell	15	1	8+2	0	3	1	1	0	1	0
36	MF	(Albania) ALB	Armando Dobra	8	1	0+3	0	1	0	1	1	2+1	0
40	MF	(England) ENG	Tommy Hughes	3	0	0	0	0+1	0	0	0	0+2	0
42	MF	(England) ENG	Brett McGavin	4	0	1	0	1	0	0	0	2	0
44	MF	(Wales) WAL	Emyr Huws	25	1	11+6	0	3	0	1	0	4	1
50	MF	(England) ENG	Liam Gibbs	1	0	0	0	0	0	0	0	1	0
51	MF	(Zimbabwe) ZIM	Tawanda Chirewa	1	0	0	0	0	0	0	0	0+1	0
Forwards
9	FW	(England) ENG	Kayden Jackson	36	11	28+4	11	1+1	0	0+1	0	0+1	0
10	FW	(England) ENG	James Norwood	32	11	22+6	11	1+1	0	0	0	1+1	0
20	FW	(England) ENG	Freddie Sears	12	1	2+9	1	0	0	0	0	1	0
47	FW	(England) ENG	Tyreece Simpson	4	0	0+3	0	0	0	0	0	0+1	0
48	FW	(England) ENG	Will Keane	29	6	14+9	3	3+1	1	0	0	2	2
Players transferred out during the season
19	MF	(England) ENG	Jordan Roberts	5	3	0+1	0	0	0	1	0	3	3
22	DF	(Democratic Republic of the Congo) COD	Aristote Nsiala	9	0	3	0	3	0	0	0	3	0
26	MF	(Tunisia) TUN	Idris El Mizouni	9	1	1+2	0	0+1	0	0	0	4+1	1
27	DF	(England) ENG	Josh Emmanuel	1	0	0	0	0	0	1	0	0	0
34	FW	(Australia) AUS	Ben Folami	1	0	0	0	0	0	0	0	1	0
38	MF	(Cyprus) CYP	Anthony Georgiou	13	0	0+10	0	2	0	0	0	1	0

Last updated: end of season
Source: Competitions

=== Goalscorers ===
No.	Pos	Nat	Player	League One	FA Cup	EFL Cup	EFL Trophy	Total
9	FW	(England)	Kayden Jackson	11	0	0	0	11
10	FW	(England)	James Norwood	11	0	0	0	11
29	DF	(England)	Luke Garbutt	5	1	0	0	6
48	FW	(England)	Will Keane	3	1	0	2	6
18	MF	(Republic of Ireland)	Alan Judge	3	1	0	0	4
19	MF	(England)	Jordan Roberts	0	0	0	3	3
7	MF	(Wales)	Gwion Edwards	2	0	0	0	2
11	MF	(England)	Jon Nolan	2	0	0	0	2
21	MF	(England)	Flynn Downes	2	0	0	0	2
24	DF	(England)	Kane Vincent-Young	2	0	0	0	2
4	DF	(England)	Luke Chambers	1	0	0	0	1
17	MF	(England)	Danny Rowe	1	0	0	0	1
20	FW	(England)	Freddie Sears	1	0	0	0	1
23	MF	(England)	Andre Dozzell	0	1	0	0	1
26	MF	(Tunisia)	Idris El Mizouni	0	0	0	1	1
28	DF	(England)	Luke Woolfenden	1	0	0	0	1
36	MF	(Albania)	Armando Dobra	0	0	1	0	1
44	MF	(Wales)	Emyr Huws	0	0	0	1	1
Own goal				1	0	0	1	2
Total				46	4	1	8	59

=== Assists ===
No.	Pos	Nat	Player	League One	FA Cup	EFL Cup	EFL Trophy	Total
9	FW	(England)	Kayden Jackson	7	0	0	0	7
18	MF	(Republic of Ireland)	Alan Judge	4	1	0	0	5
26	MF	(Tunisia)	Idris El Mizouni	1	1	0	1	3
29	DF	(England)	Luke Garbutt	3	0	0	0	3
36	MF	(Albania)	Armando Dobra	0	0	0	3	3
1	GK	(Czech Republic)	Tomáš Holý	2	0	0	0	2
10	FW	(England)	James Norwood	2	0	0	0	2
21	MF	(England)	Flynn Downes	1	0	1	0	2
28	DF	(England)	Luke Woolfenden	2	0	0	0	2
44	MF	(Wales)	Emyr Huws	2	0	0	0	2
4	DF	(England)	Luke Chambers	1	0	0	0	1
7	MF	(Wales)	Gwion Edwards	1	0	0	0	1
20	FW	(England)	Freddie Sears	0	0	0	1	1
30	DF	(England)	Myles Kenlock	0	1	0	0	1
48	FW	(England)	Will Keane	1	0	0	0	1
Total				26	3	1	5	35

=== Clean sheets ===
No.	Nat	Player	League One	FA Cup	EFL Cup	EFL Trophy	Total
1	(Czech Republic)	Tomáš Holý	9	1	0	0	10
12	(England)	Will Norris	4	0	0	1	5
Total			13	1	0	1	15

=== Disciplinary record ===
No.	Pos	Nat	Player	League One		FA Cup		EFL Cup		EFL Trophy		Total	
No.	Pos	Nat	Player	Booked	Sent off (straight red)	Booked	Sent off (straight red)	Booked	Sent off (straight red)	Booked	Sent off (straight red)	Booked	Sent off (straight red)
2	DF	(Saint Lucia)	Janoi Donacien	2	0	1	0	0	0	0	0	3	0
4	DF	(England)	Luke Chambers	4	1	0	0	0	0	0	0	4	1
5	DF	(Wales)	James Wilson	3	1	0	0	0	0	1	0	4	1
7	MF	(Wales)	Gwion Edwards	10	0	0	0	0	0	0	0	10	0
8	MF	(England)	Cole Skuse	2	0	0	0	0	0	0	0	2	0
9	FW	(England)	Kayden Jackson	4	1	0	0	0	0	0	0	4	1
10	FW	(England)	James Norwood	6	0	0	0	0	0	0	0	6	0
11	MF	(England)	Jon Nolan	5	0	0	0	0	0	0	0	5	0
12	GK	(England)	Will Norris	2	0	0	0	0	0	0	0	2	0
18	MF	(Republic of Ireland)	Alan Judge	3	0	0	0	1	0	0	0	4	0
19	MF	(England)	Jordan Roberts	0	0	0	0	1	0	1	0	2	0
20	FW	(England)	Freddie Sears	2	0	0	0	0	0	0	0	2	0
21	MF	(England)	Flynn Downes	10	0	2	0	0	0	0	0	12	0
22	DF	(Democratic Republic of the Congo)	Aristote Nsiala	3	0	0	0	0	0	1	0	4	0
23	MF	(England)	Andre Dozzell	2	0	1	0	0	0	0	0	3	0
27	DF	(England)	Josh Emmanuel	0	0	0	0	1	0	0	0	1	0
28	DF	(England)	Luke Woolfenden	8	0	0	0	0	0	1	0	9	0
29	DF	(England)	Luke Garbutt	3	0	0	0	0	0	0	0	3	0
30	DF	(England)	Myles Kenlock	1	0	0	0	0	0	0	0	1	0
36	MF	(Albania)	Armando Dobra	1	1	1	0	1	0	0	0	3	1
44	MF	(Wales)	Emyr Huws	4	0	0	0	0	0	2	0	6	0
48	FW	(England)	Will Keane	0	0	0	0	0	0	1	0	1	0
53	DF	(England)	Tommy Smith	0	0	0	0	0	0	1	0	1	0
Total				74	4	5	0	4	0	8	0	90	4

=== Suspensions ===
No.	Position	Player	Suspension	Start date	Reason	Source
5	DF	(Wales) James Wilson	1 game	5 October 2019 (vs Fleetwood Town)	Red card - second yellow card	
36	MF	(Albania) Armando Dobra	3 games	20 October 2019 (vs Accrington Stanley)	Red card - dangerous play	
21	MF	(England) Flynn Downes	1 game	26 October 2019 (vs Southend United)	5 yellow cards	
10	FW	(England) James Norwood	1 game	26 November 2019 (vs Wycombe Wanderers)	5 yellow cards	
7	MF	(Wales) Gwion Edwards	1 game	7 December 2019 (vs Coventry City)	5 yellow cards	
4	DF	(England) Luke Chambers	1 game	21 December 2019 (vs Portsmouth)	Red card - second yellow card	
7	MF	(Wales) Gwion Edwards	2 games	1 February 2020 (vs Peterborough United)	10 yellow cards	
9	FW	(England) Kayden Jackson	3 games	22 February 2020 (vs Oxford United)	Red card - dangerous play	

=== Captains ===
No.	Nat	Player	League One	FA Cup	EFL Cup	EFL Trophy	Total	Notes
4	(England)	Luke Chambers	31	0	1	0	32	Club captain
8	(England)	Cole Skuse	4	1	0	2	7	Vice-captain
5	(Wales)	James Wilson	0	1	0	1	2	
21	(England)	Flynn Downes	1	1	0	0	2	
11	(England)	Jon Nolan	0	0	0	1	1	
22	(Democratic Republic of the Congo)	Aristote Nsiala	0	0	0	1	1	
44	(Wales)	Emyr Huws	0	1	0	0	1	

== Awards ==
=== Greene King Player of the Month ===
Ipswich Town official player of the month award.

Month	Player
August	(England) Flynn Downes
September	(England) Kane Vincent-Young
October	(England) Kayden Jackson
November	(England) Luke Woolfenden
December	(England) Luke Garbutt
January	(England) Luke Woolfenden

=== EFL League One Manager of the Month ===
Month	Manager	Ref
August	(Scotland) Paul Lambert	

=== PFA Fans' League One Player of the Month ===
Month	Player	Ref
August	(England) James Norwood	
September	(England) Kane Vincent-Young	
