= Alex Henderson (footballer, born 2001) =

English footballer

Personal information
- Full name: Alexander Martin George Henderson
- Date of birth: 3 November 2001 (age 24)
- Place of birth: Boxford, England
- Position: Centre back

Team information
- Current team: Georgia State Panthers
- Number: 6

Youth career
- 2012–2020: Ipswich Town

College career
Years	Team	Apps	(Gls)
2020–	Georgia State Panthers	13	(1)

Senior career*
Years	Team	Apps	(Gls)
2019–2020	Ipswich Town	0	(0)
2019–2020	→ Bury Town (loan)	12	(0)
- * Club domestic league appearances and goals as of 05:48, 8 November 2020 (UTC)

Alexander Martin George Henderson (born 3 November 2001) is an English footballer who plays college soccer for Georgia State University.

== College career ==
Ahead of the 2020 NCAA Division I men's soccer season, Henderson signed a National Letter of Intent to play college soccer for Georgia State University. He made his college soccer debut on 18 September 2020, playing 90 minutes in a 2–1 victory over Mercer University, contributing to one assist. Henderson was named to the TopDrawer Soccer Team of the Week for September 22. Henderson scored his first collegiate goal on 13 November 2020 in a 1-1 draw against Central Arkansas.

Following the conclusion of the 2020 season, Henderson was named a freshman (first year) All-American by TopDrawer Soccer, for being one of the top first year college soccer players in the United States.

== Club career ==
=== Ipswich Town ===
Henderson made his first-team debut for the club on 4 December 2019, starting in a 1–1 away draw with Peterborough United in an EFL Trophy second round match, which Ipswich went on to win 5–6 on penalties. He was offered a one-year extension to his scholarship at the end of the 2019–20 season, however he turned the deal down in order to take up an offer for a place at Georgia State University in the United States.

== Career statistics ==
As of match played 7 March 2020

Appearances and goals by club, season and competition
Club	Season	Division	League		FA Cup		EFL Cup		Other		Total	
Club	Season	Division	Apps	Goals	Apps	Goals	Apps	Goals	Apps	Goals	Apps	Goals
Ipswich Town	2019–20	League One	0	0	0	0	0	0	1 (Note: Appearance in EFL Trophy)	0	1	0
Bury Town (loan)	2019–20	IL North Division	12	0	0	0	—		0	0	12	0
Career total			12	0	0	0	0	0	1	0	13	0
