= Tommy Smith (footballer, born 2001) =

English footballer

Personal information
- Full name: Thomas Ryan Smith
- Date of birth: 18 November 2001 (age 24)
- Place of birth: Bury St Edmunds, England
- Position: Left back

Team information
- Current team: Needham Market

Youth career
- 2009–2022: Ipswich Town

Senior career*
Years	Team	Apps	(Gls)
2019–2022	Ipswich Town	0	(0)
2019–2020	→ Bury Town (loan)	18	(0)
2021	→ Lowestoft Town (loan)	11	(0)
2022	Stowmarket Town (loan)	7	(0)
2022–2023	Stowmarket Town	35	(0)
2023–	Needham Market	39	(0)
- * Club domestic league appearances and goals as of 08:29, 27 May 2024 (UTC)

Thomas Ryan Smith is an English semi-professional footballer who plays as a left back for Southern League Premier Division Central club Needham Market.

== Club career ==
=== Ipswich Town ===
Smith joined Ipswich Town's academy aged 8. He made his first-team debut for the club on 4 December 2019, appearing as a second-half substitute in a 1–1 away draw with Peterborough United in an EFL Trophy second round match, which Ipswich went on to win 6–5 on penalties.

In November 2019, Smith joined Isthmian League Division One North side Bury Town on loan. He made 19 appearances for his hometown club before returning to parent club Ipswich Town.

While on loan at Bury Town, Smith signed his first professional contract with Ipswich Town on 25 February 2020.

Smith started the 2021/22 season on loan at Southern Premier Central side Lowestoft Town, making 13 appearances. He finished the season at Isthmian League Division One North side Stowmarket Town, where he made a further 8 appearances.

=== Stowmarket Town ===
At the end of that season, Smith was released by Ipswich Town. On 16 June 2022, Smith returned to Stowmarket Town on a permanent deal. Smith made 44 appearances in the 2022/23 season.

=== Needham Market ===
On 3 June 2023, Smith joined Southern Premier Central side Needham Market. He made 49 appearances in the 2023/24 season as Needham Market were crowned champions and promoted to the National League North for the first time in their history.

== Career statistics ==
As of match played 10 November 2020

Appearances and goals by club, season and competition
Club	Season	League			FA Cup		EFL Cup		Other		Total	
Club	Season	Division	Apps	Goals	Apps	Goals	Apps	Goals	Apps	Goals	Apps	Goals
Ipswich Town	2019–20	League One	0	0	0	0	0	0	1 (Note: Appearances in EFL Trophy)	0	1	0
Ipswich Town	2020–21	League One	0	0	0	0	0	0	1	0	1	0
Ipswich Town	Total		0	0	0	0	0	0	2	0	2	0
Bury Town (loan)	2019–20	Isthmian League North Division	18	0	0	0	—		1	0	19	0
Lowestoft Town (loan)	2021–22	Southern League Premier Central Division	11	0	1	0	—		1	0	13	0
Stowmarket Town (loan)	2021-22	Isthmian League North Division	7	0	0	0	—		1	0	8	0
Stowmarket Town	2022-23	Isthmian League North Division	35	0	1	0	—		8	0	44	0
Needham Market	2023-24	Southern League Premier Central Division	39	0	6	0	—		4	0	49	0
Career total			110	0	8	0	0	0	17	0	135	0
