= Luke Chambers =

English footballer (born 1985)

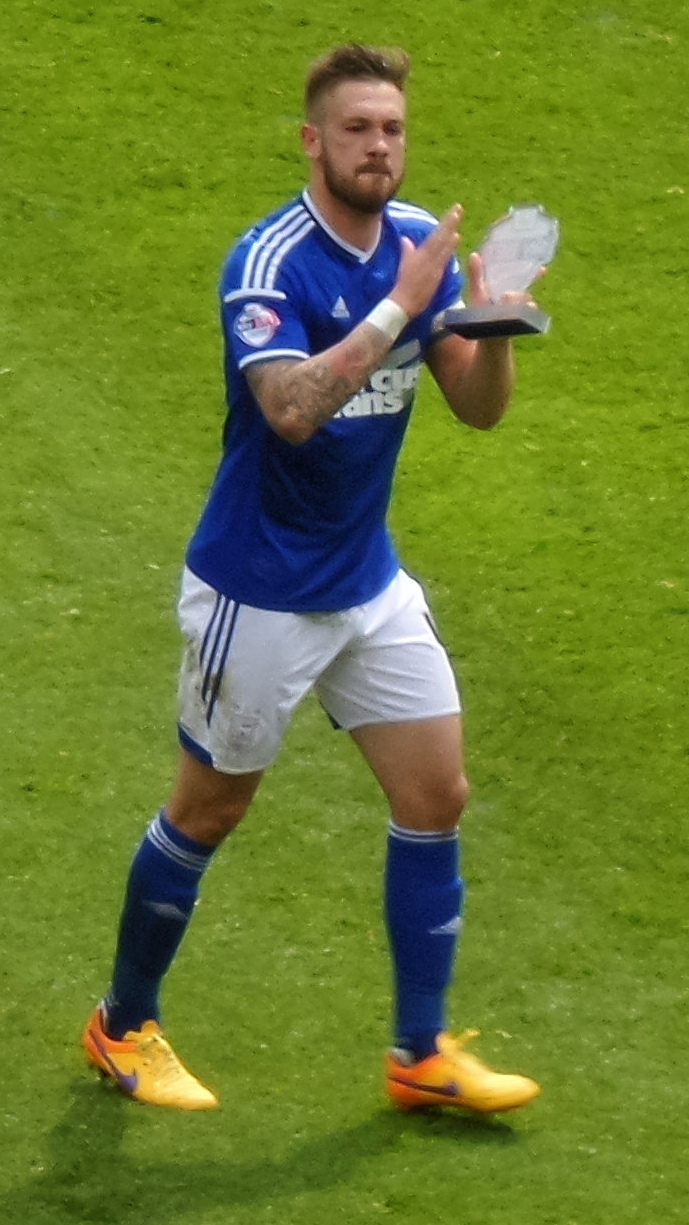
- Chambers playing for Ipswich Town in 2015

Personal information
- Full name: Luke Chambers
- Date of birth: 28 September 1985 (age 41)
- Place of birth: Kettering, England
- Height: 6 ft 1 in (1.85 m)
- Positions: Centre back; right back

Youth career
- 2001–2003: Northampton Town

Senior career*
Years	Team	Apps	(Gls)
2003–2007	Northampton Town	125	(1)
2007–2012	Nottingham Forest	205	(17)
2012–2021	Ipswich Town	376	(18)
2021–2023	Colchester United	86	(2)
Total		792	(38)
- * Club domestic league appearances and goals as of 12:20, 29 September 2023 (UTC)

Luke Chambers (born 28 September 1985) is an English former professional footballer who played as a defender. Primarily a centre back, he could also play at right back. Chambers made 792 appearances in the English Football League, placing him in the top ten list of all time.

Chambers began his career at Northampton Town, for whom he made over 100 appearances in five years, and Nottingham Forest where he made over 200 appearances. He joined Ipswich Town in July 2012 on a free transfer, and was appointed club captain in 2014. He went on to make over 370 appearances for the club before departing in 2021. He joined Colchester United in June 2021 where he remained until his retirement in 2023. In 2025 he became a baller league coach for N5.

== Club career ==
=== Northampton Town ===
Born in Kettering, Northamptonshire, Chambers started his career at local side Northampton Town. After coming through the youth system at Northampton, made first-team his debut for the club against Mansfield in May 2003. He quickly became a regular in the first-team at Northampton, making 29 appearances during his first full season at the club. He was named captain by then Northampton manager Colin Calderwood, who later signed him for Nottingham Forest.

He helped Northampton win promotion to League One in 2006 after finishing second in League Two during the 2005–06 season, following two consecutive seasons in the play-offs. He continued to serve as a first-team regular following Northampton's promotion to League One. His only goal as a Northampton player came against Swansea City in October 2006. He made 34 appearances for Northampton across all competitions during the first half of the 2006–07 season before joining Nottingham Forest in January 2007.

=== Nottingham Forest ===
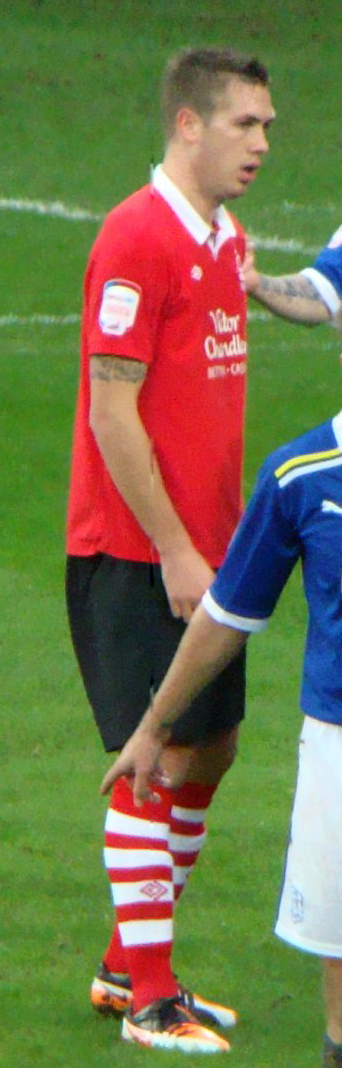
Chambers playing for Nottingham Forest in 2011

Chambers signed for Forest for an undisclosed fee on 30 January 2007, rejoining former Northampton manager Calderwood. His league debut came away against Bradford City. In his first season, he was mainly used as a substitute. During the 2007–08 season, Chambers was played regularly at right-back as part of a Forest defence that kept a record 24 clean sheets, eventually earning them promotion to the Championship. He scored eight goals in total, six of them in the league.

On 4 August 2008, Chambers signed a new three-year contract, keeping him at the City Ground until 2011. He began the 2008–09 season again selected at right-back. Criticism was expressed at his ability to fulfill that position at Championship level. It wasn't until the arrival of new manager Billy Davies in January 2009 that Chambers was finally selected at centre-back. In the 2008–09 season he scored two goals: the first was the decider in a 2–1 home win against Sheffield Wednesday and the second came in the last game of the season in a 3–1 home win against relegated Southampton.

Chambers started the 2009–10 season as he had ended the last and scoring two goals in the process. This was not enough to keep him in the team however, and the return of Kelvin Wilson from injury, combined with the presence of Chris Gunter at right-back, saw Chambers end the season with a limited number of appearances.

At the start of the 2010–11 season, Chambers signed a new two-year contract to keep him at the club until 2012. Chambers started the 2010–11 season mainly as a substitute, however due to injuries and the poor form of Kelvin Wilson, he was given an opportunity at centre-back. On 18 December, Chambers scored his first goal of the season in a 3–0 home win against Crystal Palace. He impressed with consistent performances, keeping Wilson out of the first team and becoming a first choice, alongside Wes Morgan, in the centre of Forest's defence. He made 45 league starts, scoring 6 goals including two in the 5–1 win over Scunthorpe United. He was voted Player of the Year for the 2010–11 season.

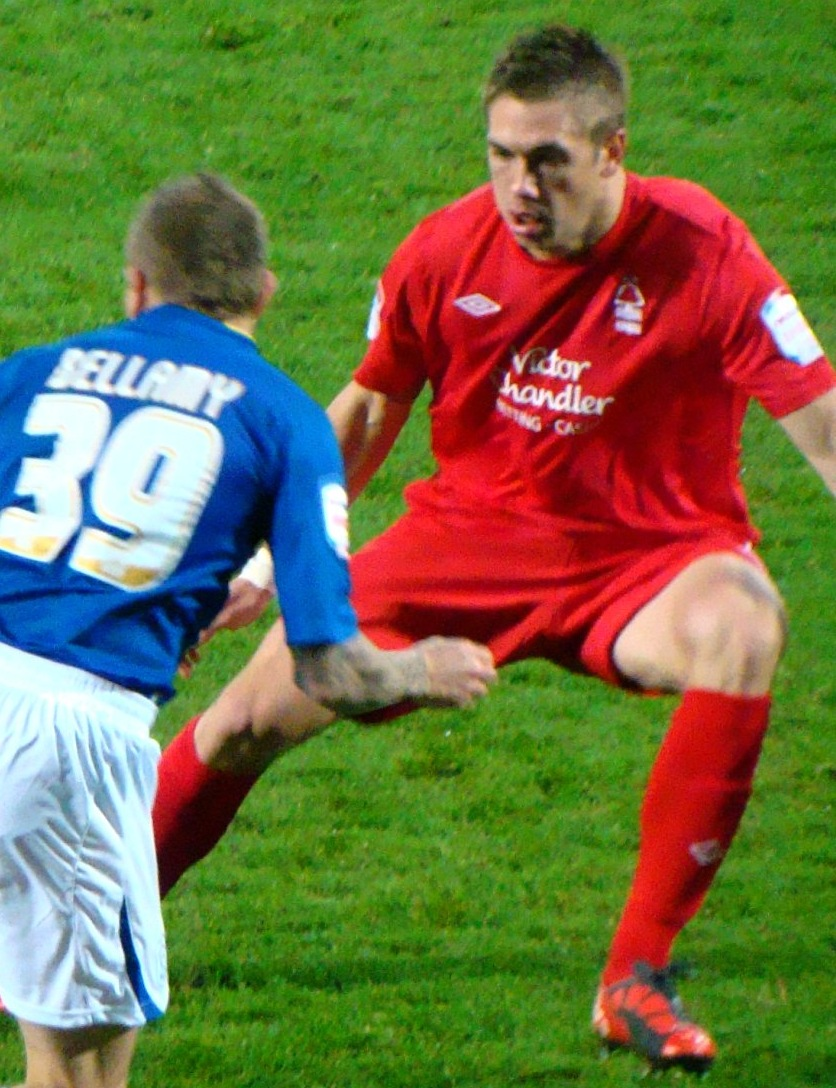
Chambers (right) playing for Nottingham Forest in 2010

Chambers' form in the 2010–11 season resulted in interest from the Republic of Ireland national team that Chambers qualifies for through his grandfather. On 5 August 2011, just before the start of the 2011–12 season, he was appointed as Nottingham Forest captain by new manager Steve McClaren, and continued to skipper the side under the leadership of McClaren's replacement Steve Cotterill. However, at the end of a difficult season for Forest, he turned down the offer of a new contract, and at midnight on 30 June 2012 Chambers became a free agent.

=== Ipswich Town ===
==== 2012–2014: Arrival and debut seasons ====
With his contract at Forest set to expire, Chambers was approached by several other Championship sides, before undertaking a medical at Portman Road on 3 July 2012. Chambers signed a three-year deal at Ipswich Town on a free transfer on 9 July 2012. He made his debut on 14 August 2012, in a 3–1 home win against Bristol Rovers in the League Cup. He made his league debut four days later, in a 1–1 draw at home to Blackburn Rovers. On 1 September, he scored his first goal for the club in a 2–2 draw at home to Huddersfield Town. He also captained the club for the first time during the game due to the absence of regular captain Carlos Edwards through injury. Playing as a central defender, Chambers was part of an Ipswich defence that kept 12 clean sheets in the last 22 games of the 2012–13 season. Chambers impressed in his debut season at Portman Road, being named Town's Players' Player of the year.

The 2013–14 season saw Chambers moved to right back, following the arrival of Christophe Berra. Chambers kept his starting place at right back for the entire 2013–14 season, making 48 appearances in all competitions, scoring 3 goals. Chambers captained the Blues through the majority of the 2013–14 season, with the current club captain Carlos Edwards out of favour for most of the season.

==== 2014–2017: Assuming the captaincy ====
He continued to be a first team regular during the 2014–15 season. Chambers officially took over the role of club captain following the departure of Carlos Edwards. He made 50 appearances in all competitions across the 2014–15 season, scoring once, as Ipswich finished 6th in the Championship, qualifying for the Championship play-offs as a result.

Chambers continued to play primarily as a right back during the 2015–16 season. He made 48 appearances across all competitions, scoring 3 goals, including a 90th-minute winner over Queens Park Rangers at Portman Road on Boxing Day 2015.

He once again kept his place at right back for the 2016–17 season, making 48 appearances across the course of the season, scoring 4 goals, his highest goal return in a single season during his time at the club. In May 2017 Chambers signed a new two-year deal with the club, keeping him at Portman Road until 2019. This was announced following speculation on his future at the club, with Chambers' former club Nottingham Forest offering him a new contract following the end of the 2016–17 season.

==== 2017–2019: Ipswich Player of the season ====
The 2017–18 season saw Chambers return to the centre of defense, primarily playing alongside Adam Webster. He made a total of 39 appearances in all competitions during the season, including scoring in a 1–1 draw against local rivals Norwich City at Carrow Road on 18 February 2018. He was forced to miss out on the final five games of the season due to suffering a cracked rib, following a collision with Ipswich goalkeeper Bartosz Białkowski during a 1–0 loss to Brentford at Griffin Park on 7 April 2018. He worked alongside caretaker manager Bryan Klug following the departure of Mick McCarthy towards the end of the 2017–18 season, during this time he expressed his desire to manage Ipswich at some point in the future, he stated "I'd love to have that opportunity here one day. It's a great club. I'd like to think I have given good service here as a player and I want that to continue. It's also a great place to gain experience and progress as a coach."

Chambers retained his captaincy following the arrival of Paul Hurst in 2018. On 11 August 2018, in a match against Rotherham United at Portman Road, Chambers became Ipswich Town's highest appearance maker this century, having played 281 games for the club. Later that year on 30 November 2018, Chambers made his 300th appearance for the club in a 2–0 loss to Nottingham Forest. He made 44 appearances during the 2018–19 season. Despite rumors of a potential move to the MLS, in March 2019 Chambers committed his future to the club and signed a new two-year deal, keeping him at the club until 2021. Hurst was sacked and replaced by Paul Lambert, who was unable to reverse Ipswich's poor form, and the club was relegated to EFL League One. The relegation ended Ipswich's 17-year stay in the Championship. Chambers won the club's Player of the Year award for the 2018–19 season.

==== 2019–2021: Final seasons and departure ====
He scored his first goal of the 2019–20 season on 17 August, netting a 94th-minute equaliser in a 2–2 draw with Peterborough United at the London Road Stadium. He became the first Ipswich player since 1957 to have scored goals in both the second and third tiers of English football for the club. Ipswich finished 11th in League One, despite being tipped as promotion contenders.

He scored in the opening game of the 2020–21 season, scoring a header in a 3–0 win over Bristol Rovers in an EFL Cup match at Portman Road. On 20 October 2020, Chambers moved into the top 10 league appearance makers of all time for Ipswich Town, making his 344th appearance for the club away at Doncaster Rovers and moving into joint 10th place in the list alongside Jimmy Leadbetter, before becoming the 10th highest appearance maker outright in the following game away to Lincoln City on 24 October. On 6 March, Chambers scored on his 386th appearance for Ipswich in a match against Gillingham, moving him outright into the top 10 all-time appearance makers for Ipswich Town.

On 10 May 2021, Ipswich announced that Chambers would be leaving the club after nine years at Portman Road. His 396th and final appearance came the previous day, where he captained the side to a 3–1 victory against Fleetwood Town.

=== Colchester United and retirement ===
On 20 June 2021, Chambers joined fellow East Anglian club Colchester United on a free transfer, reuniting him with former teammates Cole Skuse, Tommy Smith and Dean Gerken. He signed a two-year deal with the club. He made his Colchester debut on 7 August 2021 in a 0–0 draw away at Carlisle United.

On 4 February 2023, Chambers made his 779th league appearance, moving him into the top ten for the most appearances in English league football. On 12 May 2023, Colchester confirmed that Chambers would be released upon the expiration of his contract, having made 96 appearances for the club in all competitions during his two year spell.

On 3 August 2023, Chambers announced his retirement from football at the age of 37.

Chambers was awarded the Sir Tom Finney Award at the 2024 EFL Awards, recognising players who made an outstanding contribution to football and the league.

== Career statistics ==
As of match played 8 May 2023

Appearances and goals by club, season and competition
Club	Season	League			FA Cup		League Cup		Other		Total	
Club	Season	Division	Apps	Goals	Apps	Goals	Apps	Goals	Apps	Goals	Apps	Goals
Northampton Town	2002–03	Second Division	1	0	0	0	0	0	0	0	1	0
Northampton Town	2003–04	Third Division	24	0	2	0	2	0	1 (Note: Appearance in Football League Trophy)	0	29	0
Northampton Town	2004–05	League Two	27	0	2	0	2	0	4 (Note: Two appearances in Football League Trophy, Two appearance in League Two play-offs)	0	35	0
Northampton Town	2005–06	League Two	43	0	4	0	2	0	1	0	50	0
Northampton Town	2006–07	League One	29	1	3	0	1	0	1	0	34	1
Northampton Town	Total		124	1	11	0	7	0	7	0	149	1
Nottingham Forest	2006–07	League One	14	0	0	0	0	0	2 (Note: Appearances in League One play-offs)	0	16	0
Nottingham Forest	2007–08	League One	42	6	3	0	2	0	1	2	48	8
Nottingham Forest	2008–09	Championship	39	2	3	0	2	0	—		44	2
Nottingham Forest	2009–10	Championship	23	3	2	0	1	1	—		26	4
Nottingham Forest	2010–11	Championship	44	6	2	1	1	0	2 (Note: Appearances in Championship play-offs)	0	49	7
Nottingham Forest	2011–12	Championship	43	0	1	0	2	0	—		46	0
Nottingham Forest	Total		205	17	11	1	8	1	5	2	229	21
Ipswich Town	2012–13	Championship	44	3	0	0	2	0	—		46	3
Ipswich Town	2013–14	Championship	46	3	1	0	1	0	—		48	3
Ipswich Town	2014–15	Championship	45	1	2	0	1	0	2	0	50	1
Ipswich Town	2015–16	Championship	45	3	1	0	2	0	—		48	3
Ipswich Town	2016–17	Championship	46	4	1	0	1	0	—		48	4
Ipswich Town	2017–18	Championship	37	1	1	0	1	0	—		39	1
Ipswich Town	2018–19	Championship	43	0	0	0	1	0	—		44	0
Ipswich Town	2019–20	League One	31	1	0	0	1	0	0	0	32	1
Ipswich Town	2020–21	League One	39	2	0	0	1	1	1	0	41	3
Ipswich Town	Total		376	18	6	0	11	1	3	0	396	19
Colchester United	2021–22	League Two	43	1	2	0	0	0	4	2	49	3
Colchester United	2022–23	League Two	43	1	1	0	2	0	2	0	48	1
Colchester United	Total		86	2	3	0	2	0	6	2	97	4
Career total			791	38	31	1	28	2	21	4	871	45

== Honours ==
Northampton Town

- Football League Two runner-up: 2005–06

Nottingham Forest

- Football League One runner-up: 2007–08

Individual

- Nottingham Forest Player of the Year: 2010–11
- Ipswich Town Players' Player of the Year: 2012–13
- Ipswich Town Player of the Year: 2018–19
- Sir Tom Finney Award: 2024
