= Flynn Downes =

English footballer (born 1999)

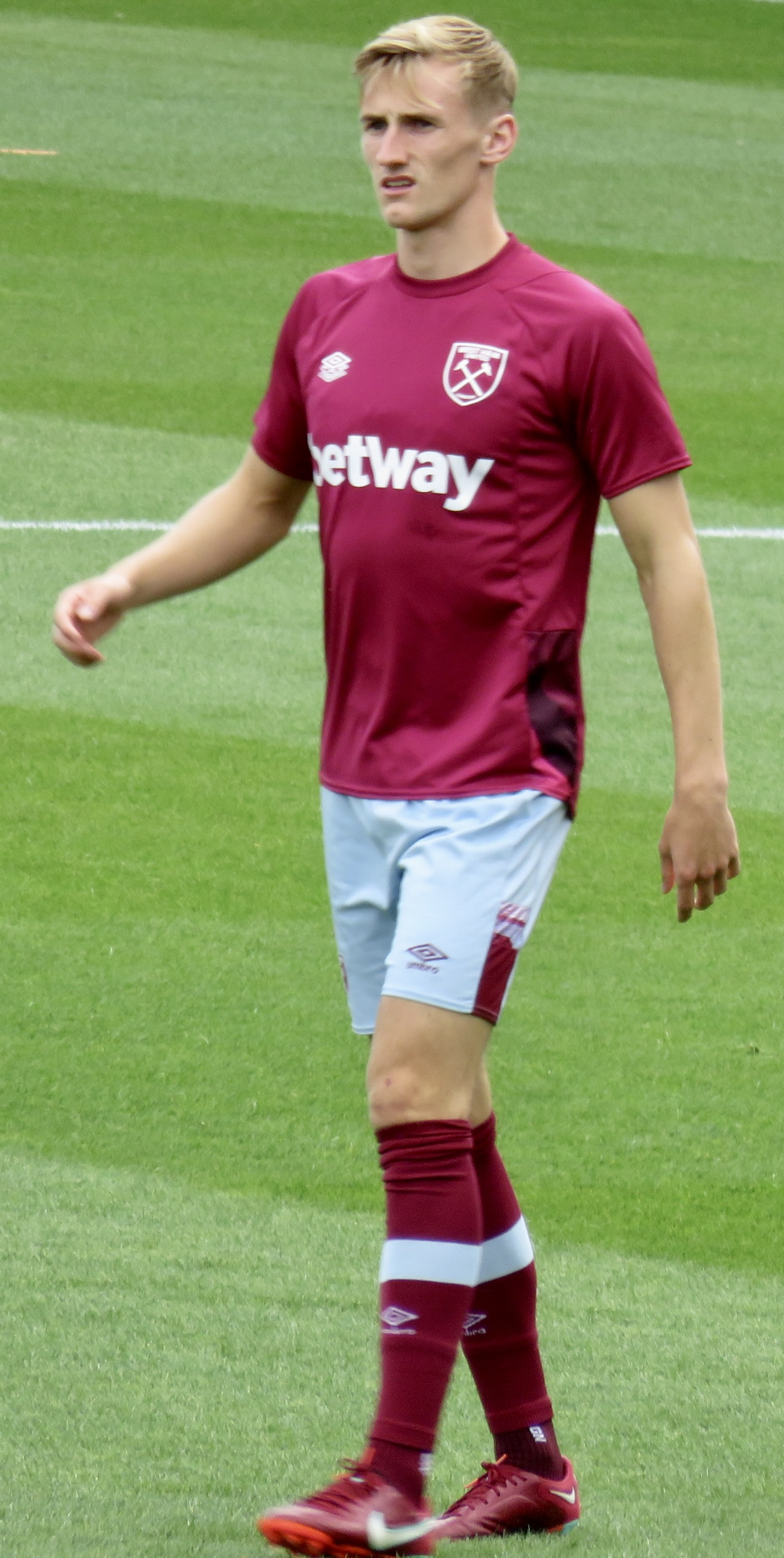
- Downes with West Ham United in 2022

Personal information
- Full name: Flynn Downes
- Date of birth: 20 January 1999 (age 27)
- Place of birth: Brentwood, England
- Height: 5 ft 8 in (1.73 m)
- Position: Defensive midfielder

Team information
- Current team: Southampton
- Number: 4

Youth career
- 2005–2006: Ongar Town
- 2006–2017: Ipswich Town

Senior career*
| Years | Team | Apps | (Gls) |
| 2017–2021 | Ipswich Town | 92 | (3) |
| 2018 | → Luton Town (loan) | 10 | (0) |
| 2021–2022 | Swansea City | 37 | (1) |
| 2022–2024 | West Ham United | 21 | (0) |
| 2023–2024 | → Southampton (loan) | 33 | (2) |
| 2024– | Southampton | 77 | (4) |

International career
| 2017–2018 | England U19 | 5 | (0) |
| 2018–2019 | England U20 | 6 | (0) |
- * Club domestic league appearances and goals as of 15:29, 21 November 2026 (UTC)

Flynn Downes (born 20 January 1999) is an English professional footballer who plays as a defensive midfielder for EFL Championship club Southampton.

A product of the Ipswich Town academy, which he joined in 2006, Downes made his debut for the club in 2017. After spending some time on loan at Luton Town in 2018, Downes returned to Ipswich and firmly established himself in the first team for the next few seasons. After much speculation surrounding his future starting in summer 2020, Downes joined Swansea City in August 2021, moving on to West Ham United the following year. In his first season at West Ham, he won the UEFA Europa Conference League. He spent the 2023–24 season on loan at EFL Championship club Southampton before joining the club permanently in 2024. He has represented his country at youth levels.

== Club career ==
=== Ipswich Town ===
==== 2017–18 season ====
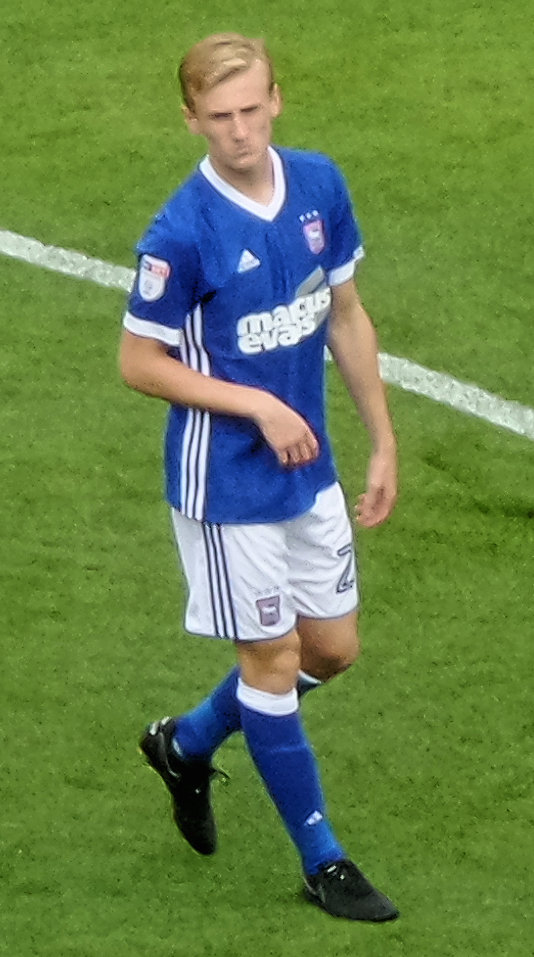
Downes playing for Ipswich Town in 2017

Downes was born in Brentwood, Essex and attended Brentwood School. He signed for Ipswich Town at the age of seven, after joining from Ongar Town, signing a two-year scholarship in May 2015. Downes penned a one-year professional contract with the club on 29 June 2017, with the option of a further year. However, after impressing manager Mick McCarthy during pre-season, he signed a new three-year contract with Ipswich on 19 July to keep him at the club until summer 2020. He made his professional debut on the opening day of 2017–18, coming on as a substitute for the injured Andre Dozzell in first-half stoppage time in a 1–0 home victory over Birmingham City.

===== Luton Town (loan) =====
On 31 January 2018, Downes joined League Two leaders Luton Town on loan until the end of 2017–18. He made his debut three days later, starting in Luton's 1–0 home win over Exeter City. Following the match, manager Nathan Jones said "He was outstanding. It's as if he lives here in terms of the way he went about the pitch, the confidence he played with, the security and everything he had". Downes finished the loan with ten appearances, as Luton were promoted to League One after finishing second in League Two.

==== 2018 to 2020 ====
Following his return from loan, Downes played regularly for the first team during the 2018–19 season, making 30 appearances across all competitions – ending in the team being relegated to League One. He signed a new three-year contract with the club in March 2019, with the option of a further year, and scored his first professional goal in a 3–2 home victory over Leeds United on the final day of the season.

Downes remained a regular player for Ipswich following relegation to League One during the 2019–20 season. He scored his first goal of the season in a 3–0 home win over Shrewsbury Town on 31 August. On 1 December 2019, Downes captained Ipswich for the first time in an FA Cup second round tie against Coventry City, which ended as a 1–1 draw. Aged 20, he became the club's youngest ever captain.

==== 2020–21 season ====
Following his impressive performances for the Blues, Downes was linked with a move away from the club during summer 2020. On 1 September, the club confirmed that it had rejected two bids for Downes from a Premier League club, widely reported to be Crystal Palace. After the second bid was rejected, Downes reportedly handed in a transfer request and subsequently was left out of the squad for the club's opening three games.

Downes returned to the first-team on 16 September, coming on as a second-half substitute in an EFL Cup second round tie against Fulham. He continued to feature from the bench for the next few matches, before suffering a knee injury in a 1–1 draw with MK Dons on 3 October, with the injury expected to rule him out of action for two months. Downes made 25 appearances during an injury hit 2020–21 season.

During the summer of 2021, Downes was told by new manager Paul Cook that he was not in his plans for the upcoming season, and was told to train with the club's U23s. He was subsequently not allocated a squad number for the 2021–22 season and continued to be linked with a move away from the club, with Championship clubs such as AFC Bournemouth, Barnsley and Swansea City being reportedly interested.

=== Swansea City ===
On 10 August 2021, Downes joined Swansea City on a four-year deal, for a fee reportedly around £1.5 million. This ended his 15-year association with Ipswich Town. In the 2021–22 season, Downes completed 92.6% of his 2,465 attempted passes achieving the highest pass-completion rate in the top four divisions in English football for 2021–22.

=== West Ham United ===
On 7 July 2022, Downes signed for West Ham United on a five-year contract, with a further one-year option, for an undisclosed fee, reported by the BBC to be around £12 million. On 7 August 2022, Downes made his Premier League debut as a 92nd-minute substitute for Jarrod Bowen in a 2–0 home defeat to Manchester City. On 7 June 2023, Downes was part of the squad in the 2023 UEFA Europa Conference League final, against Fiorentina in Prague. West Ham won their first trophy in 43 years with a 2–1 victory.

=== Southampton ===
On 21 August 2023, Downes joined Southampton on a season-long loan. Downes made his debut for the club on 26 August 2023 in a 2–1 victory against Queens Park Rangers, coming on as a substitute for Jack Stephens in the 25th minute. On 20 January 2024, he scored his first goal for Southampton in a 3–1 away victory against Swansea City. At the end of the season Downes' performances for Southampton were praised by United Kingdom Prime Minister, Rishi Sunak, himself a Southampton supporter. Downes ended the season having made 37 appearances in all competitions. He scored two goals and made three assists and on 26 May was a member of the team which won promotion back to the Premier League having beaten Leeds United 1–0 in the Championship play-off final at Wembley.

On 16 July 2024, Downes joined Southampton permanently on a four-year contract for a fee undisclosed by the clubs but reported to be an initial fee of £15 million. He scored his first Premier League goal on 29 November 2024, the equaliser in a 1–1 draw at Brighton.

On 23 April 2026, Downes was given a retrospective three-match suspension by the Football Association for violent conduct after an incident against Swansea City where he elbowed Liam Cullen during a challenge.

== International career ==
Downes was called up to the England under-19 team on 24 August 2017 for two friendly matches against Poland and Germany. He made his debut on 5 September against the latter, starting in a 3–1 defeat, in which he was substituted in the 60th minute. He was capped five times by England at under-19 level. Downes was named on standby for the England under-20 team on 9 November 2018 for a match against Germany. He was called into the squad three days later and earned his first cap as an 89th-minute substitute in a 2–0 victory the following week.

== Personal life ==
He attended Brentwood School, Essex. Downes supports West Ham United. His family also supports the club.

== Career statistics ==
As of match played 21 November 2026

Appearances and goals by club, season and competition
| Club | Season | League | | | FA Cup | | EFL Cup | | Other | | Total | |
| Club | Season | Division | Apps | Goals | Apps | Goals | Apps | Goals | Apps | Goals | Apps | Goals |
|---|---|---|---|---|---|---|---|---|---|---|---|---|
| Ipswich Town | 2017–18 | Championship | 10 | 0 | 0 | 0 | 2 | 0 | — | | 12 | 0 |
| Ipswich Town | 2018–19 | Championship | 29 | 1 | 1 | 0 | 0 | 0 | — | | 30 | 1 |
| Ipswich Town | 2019–20 | League One | 29 | 2 | 2 | 0 | 1 | 0 | 0 | 0 | 32 | 2 |
| Ipswich Town | 2020–21 | League One | 24 | 0 | 0 | 0 | 1 | 0 | 0 | 0 | 25 | 0 |
| Ipswich Town | Total | | 92 | 3 | 3 | 0 | 4 | 0 | 0 | 0 | 99 | 3 |
| Luton Town (loan) | 2017–18 | League Two | 10 | 0 | — | | — | | — | | 10 | 0 |
| Swansea City | 2021–22 | Championship | 37 | 1 | 1 | 0 | 1 | 0 | — | | 39 | 1 |
| West Ham United | 2022–23 | Premier League | 21 | 0 | 2 | 0 | 1 | 0 | 11 (Note: Appearances in UEFA Europa Conference League) | 0 | 35 | 0 |
| Southampton (loan) | 2023–24 | Championship | 33 | 2 | 1 | 0 | 0 | 0 | 3 (Note: Appearances in Championship play-offs) | 0 | 37 | 2 |
| Southampton | 2024–25 | Premier League | 27 | 1 | 0 | 0 | 2 | 0 | — | | 29 | 1 |
| Southampton | 2025–26 | Championship | 36 | 3 | 2 | 0 | 3 | 0 | 2 | 0 | 43 | 3 |
| Southampton | 2026–27 | Championship | 14 | 0 | 0 | 0 | 2 | 0 | — | | 16 | 0 |
| Southampton | Total | | 77 | 4 | 2 | 0 | 7 | 0 | 2 | 0 | 88 | 4 |
| Career total | | | 270 | 10 | 9 | 0 | 13 | 0 | 16 | 0 | 308 | 10 |

== Honours ==
West Ham United

- UEFA Europa Conference League: 2022–23

Southampton

- EFL Championship play-offs: 2024

Individual

- Ipswich Town Young Player of the Year: 2017–18
- Southampton Southern Daily Echo Player of the Year: 2023–24
