= 2022–23 Ipswich Town F.C. season =

Ipswich Town
2022–23 season
- Owner: Gamechanger 20 Ltd.
- Chairman: Mike O'Leary
- Manager: Kieran McKenna
- Stadium: Portman Road
- League One: 2nd (promoted)
- FA Cup: Fourth round
- EFL Cup: First round
- EFL Trophy: Second round
- Top goalscorer: League: Conor Chaplin (26); All: Conor Chaplin (29)
- Highest home attendance: 29,334, (vs Exeter City, 29 April 2023)
- Lowest home attendance: 21,948, (vs Morecambe, 24 Jan 2023)
- Average home league attendance: 26,184
Home colours	Away colours	Third colours

The 2022–23 season was the 145th season in the existence of Ipswich Town Football Club and the club's fourth consecutive season in League One. In addition to the league, they also competed in the FA Cup, the EFL Cup and the EFL Trophy.

Following a successful league campaign which saw the team score 101 goals and finish in second place, they were promoted to the Championship for the 2023–24 season.

== First-team squad ==
Number	Position(s)	Nationality	Name	Age
Goalkeepers
1	GK	(England)	Christian Walton	9 November 1995 (age 30)
13	GK	(England)	Joel Coleman	26 September 1995 (age 30)
31	GK	(Czech Republic)	Václav Hladký	14 November 1990 (age 35)
Defenders
2	CB	(Republic of Ireland)	Richard Keogh	11 August 1986 (age 40)
3	LB	(England)	Leif Davis	31 December 1999 (age 26)
4	CB	(England)	George Edmundson	15 August 1997 (age 29)
6	CB / RB	(England)	Luke Woolfenden	21 October 1998 (age 27)
15	CB	(Australia)	Cameron Burgess	21 October 1995 (age 30)
21	LB	(Jamaica)	Greg Leigh	30 September 1994 (age 31)
24	RB / LB	(England)	Kane Vincent-Young	15 March 1996 (age 30)
34	CB / RB	(England)	Harry Clarke	2 March 2001 (age 25)
44	CB / RB / LB	(Saint Lucia)	Janoi Donacien	3 November 1993 (age 32)
Midfielders
5	DM	(Egypt)	Sam Morsy (C)	10 September 1991 (age 34)
7	RW / RB	(Wales)	Wes Burns	23 November 1994 (age 31)
8	CM	(Wales)	Lee Evans	24 July 1994 (age 32)
11	RW / AM	(Republic of Ireland)	Marcus Harness	24 February 1996 (age 30)
12	DM	(England)	Dominic Ball	2 August 1995 (age 31)
25	CM	(Australia)	Massimo Luongo	25 September 1992 (age 33)
28	CM	(Guinea-Bissau)	Panutche Camará	28 February 1997 (age 29)
29	LW / RW	(England)	Kyle Edwards	17 February 1998 (age 28)
30	CM	(England)	Cameron Humphreys	30 October 2003 (age 22)
Forwards
9	CF	(England)	Freddie Ladapo	1 February 1993 (age 33)
10	SS / LW	(England)	Conor Chaplin	16 February 1997 (age 29)
14	CF	(England)	Tyreece John-Jules	14 February 2001 (age 25)
19	CF	(England)	Kayden Jackson	22 February 1994 (age 32)
23	SS / LW / RW	(Nigeria)	Sone Aluko	19 February 1989 (age 37)
27	CF	(England)	George Hirst	15 February 1999 (age 27)
33	CF	(Wales)	Nathan Broadhead	5 April 1998 (age 28)
Players transferred/loaned out during the season
16	CM	(England)	Rekeem Harper	8 March 2000 (age 26)
20	LB	(England)	Matt Penney	11 February 1998 (age 28)
22	CM	(Tunisia)	Idris El Mizouni	26 September 2000 (age 25)
26	CB	(Republic of Ireland)	Corrie Ndaba	25 December 1999 (age 26)
18	CF	(Morocco)	Gassan Ahadme	17 November 2000 (age 25)
N/A	CF	(England)	Joe Pigott	24 November 1993 (age 32)
N/A	CB	(Indonesia)	Elkan Baggott	23 October 2002 (age 23)

== First-team coaching staff ==
Position	Name
Manager	(Northern Ireland) Kieran McKenna
Assistant Manager	(England) Martyn Pert
First-team Coach	(England) Lee Grant
Goalkeeping Coach	(Republic of Ireland) Rene Gilmartin
Director of Performance	(England) Andy Rolls
Head of Sports Science	(Australia) Andy Costin
Head of Strength & Conditioning	(England) Ivan Mukandi
First-team Fitness Coach	(England) Jon Ashton
Head Physiotherapist	(England) Matt Byard
Assistant Head Physiotherapist	(England) Alex Chapman
Head of Analysis	(England) Charlie Turnbull
Head of Performance Analysis	(England) Will Stephenson
Head of Recruitment	(England) Sam Williams
Recruitment Analyst	(England) Alex Hood
Recruitment Analyst	(England) Jacob Ashton
Kit Manager	(England) James Pullen
Assistant Kit Manager	(England) Lee Owen

== Transfers ==
=== In ===
Date	Pos	Player	Transferred from	Fee	Ref
1 July 2022 (Note: The transfer was announced on 30 May, and would become official on July 1, once his Rotherham United contract expired)	CF	(England) Freddie Ladapo	(England) Rotherham United	Free Transfer	
1 July 2022 (Note: The transfer was announced on 1 June, and would become official on July 1, once his Queens Park Rangers contract expired)	DM	(England) Dominic Ball	(England) Queens Park Rangers	Free Transfer	
1 July 2022 (Note: The transfer was announced on 20 June, and would become official on July 1, once his Morecambe contract expired)	LB	(Jamaica) Greg Leigh	(England) Morecambe	Free Transfer	
16 July 2022	RW	(Republic of Ireland) Marcus Harness	(England) Portsmouth	Undisclosed (Note: Fee reported as £600,000)	
25 July 2022	LB	(England) Leif Davis	(England) Leeds United	Undisclosed (Note: Fee reported as £1,000,000, potentially rising to £1,500,000 with add-ons)	
10 August 2022	CB	(Republic of Ireland) Richard Keogh	(England) Blackpool	Undisclosed	
1 September 2022	CF	(Morocco) Gassan Ahadme	(England) Burton Albion	Undisclosed (Note: Fee reported as £300,000)	
1 September 2022	CM	(Guinea-Bissau) Panutche Camará	(England) Plymouth Argyle	Undisclosed (Note: Fee reported as £500,000)	
4 November 2022	GK	(England) Joel Coleman	(England) Rochdale	Free Transfer	
5 January 2023	CM	(Australia) Massimo Luongo	(England) Middlesbrough	Free Transfer	
9 January 2023	CF	(Wales) Nathan Broadhead	(England) Everton	Undisclosed (Note: Fee reported as £1,500,000)	
19 January 2023	CB	(England) Harry Clarke	(England) Arsenal	Undisclosed (Note: Fee reported as £1,000,000)	
31 January 2023	FW	(Republic of Ireland) Leon Ayinde	(Republic of Ireland) Cork City	Undisclosed	
31 January 2023	MF	(England) Ryan Carr	(England) Carlisle United	Undisclosed	
31 January 2023	MF	(Republic of Ireland) Michael Lavin	(Republic of Ireland) Galway United	Undisclosed	
31 January 2023	MF	(Republic of Ireland) Daniel O'Connor	(Republic of Ireland) Galway United	Undisclosed	

=== Out ===
Date	Pos	Player	Transferred to	Fee	Ref
30 June 2022	CB	(Netherlands) Levi Andoh	(England) Buxton	Released	
30 June 2022	CF	(England) Ola Bello	Unattached	Released	
30 June 2022	CM	(England) Tom Carroll	Unattached	Released	
30 June 2022	LB	(England) Bailey Clements	(England) Chesterfield	Released	
30 June 2022	LW	(England) Ross Crane	(England) Needham Market	Released	
30 June 2022	RB	(England) Dylan Crowe	(England) Torquay United	Released	
30 June 2022	GK	(Czech Republic) Tomáš Holý	(England) Carlisle United	Released	
30 June 2022	LB	(England) Myles Kenlock	(England) Barrow	Released	
30 June 2022	DM	(England) Brett McGavin	(England) Torquay United	Released	
30 June 2022	CF	(England) James Norwood	(England) Barnsley	Released	
30 June 2022	LB	(England) Tommy Smith	(England) Stowmarket Town	Released	
30 June 2022	GK	(England) Bert White	(England) Weymouth	Released	
4 July 2022	AM	(Albania) Armando Dobra	(England) Chesterfield	Mutual Consent	
1 September 2022	CF	(England) Tyreece Simpson	(England) Huddersfield Town	Undisclosed (Note: Fee reported as £500,000)	
1 January 2023	CM	(England) Tommy Hughes	(England) King's Lynn Town	Released	
15 February 2023	CF	(England) Ben Morris	(United States) Detroit City	Free Transfer	

=== Loans in ===
Date	Pos	Player	Loaned from	On loan until	Ref
22 June 2022	CF	(England) Tyreece John-Jules	(England) Arsenal	End of Season	
8 January 2023	CF	(England) George Hirst	(England) Leicester City	End of Season	

=== Loans out ===
Date	Pos	Player	Loaned to	On loan until	Ref
8 July 2022	CB	(Indonesia) Elkan Baggott	(England) Gillingham	19 January 2023 (Note: On 19 January, Baggott was recalled back from Gillingham and loaned to Cheltenham)	
16 July 2022	CF	(England) Joe Pigott	(England) Portsmouth	End of Season (Note: Pigott's loan transfer to Portsmouth was part of the deal for Marcus Harness)	
3 August 2022	CB	(England) Albie Armin	(England) Braintree Town	1 January 2023	
12 August 2022	CM	(Tunisia) Idris El Mizouni	(England) Leyton Orient	End of Season	
19 August 2022	CB	(Republic of Ireland) Corrie Ndaba	(England) Burton Albion	31 January 2023 (Note: On 31 January, Ndaba was recalled back from Burton and loaned to Fleetwood)	
24 August 2022	CM	(England) Rekeem Harper	(England) Exeter City	End of Season	
25 August 2022	LB	(England) Matt Penney	(Scotland) Motherwell	25 January 2023	
6 January 2023	CM	(Republic of Ireland) Matt Healy	(Republic of Ireland) Cork City	End of Season	
19 January 2023	CB	(Indonesia) Elkan Baggott	(England) Cheltenham Town	End of Season	
21 January 2023	LB	(England) Matt Penney	(England) Charlton Athletic	End of Season	
27 January 2023	RB	(Republic of Ireland) Edwin Agbaje	(England) Yeovil Town	End of Season	
31 January 2023	CF	(Morocco) Gassan Ahadme	(England) Burton Albion	End of Season	
31 January 2023	CB	(Republic of Ireland) Corrie Ndaba	(England) Fleetwood Town	End of Season	
31 January 2023	CF	(Australia) Tete Yengi	(England) Northampton Town	End of Season	

=== New contracts ===
==== Coaching staff ====
Date signed	Nationality	Name	Contract length	Expiry	Ref.
16 June 2023	(Northern Ireland)	Kieran McKenna	4 years	2027	

==== First-team ====
Date signed	Number	Position	Nationality	Name	Contract length	Expiry	Ref.
27 July 2022	26	CB	(Republic of Ireland)	Corrie Ndaba	3 years	2025	
5 January 2023	13	GK	(England)	Joel Coleman	6 months	2023	
13 January 2023	30	CM	(England)	Cameron Humphreys	3.5 years	2026	
12 June 2023	10	SS	(England)	Conor Chaplin	3 years	2026	
13 June 2023	25	CM	(Australia)	Massimo Luongo	1 year	2024	
21 June 2023	23	RW	(Nigeria)	Sone Aluko	1 year	2024	

==== Academy ====
Date signed	Number	Position	Nationality	Name	Contract length	Expiry	Ref.
1 July 2022	–	CB	(Northern Ireland)	Cameron Stewart	2 years	2024	
1 July 2022	–	FB	(Republic of Ireland)	Edwin Agbaje	1 year	2023	
1 July 2022	–	CB	(England)	Zak Bradshaw	1 year	2023	
1 July 2022	–	FW	(England)	Jesse Nwabueze	1 year	2023	
1 July 2022	–	GK	(Wales)	Lewis Ridd	1 year	2023	
8 December 2022	–	CM	(England)	Emmanuel Okunowo	2.5 years	2025	
2 March 2023	–	LB	(England)	Harry Barbrook	–	–	
2 March 2023	–	CM	(England)	Finley Barbrook	–	–	

== Pre-season and friendlies ==
In May 2022, Ipswich announced that the first-team would take part in a pre-season training camp at Loughborough University as part of the club's preparations for the 2022–23 season. On 31 May, Ipswich announced that they would play AFC Wimbledon in a pre-season friendly at Plough Lane on 16 July. The Tractor Boys confirmed their pre-season schedule on June 8, with friendly matches against Needham Market, West Ham United, Millwall and Southend United being added to the already confirmed fixture against AFC Wimbledon. Ipswich also played a behind closed doors friendly against Arsenal at the London club's training ground on 2 July.

Win Draw Loss Fixtures

25 June 2022 Friendly	Needham Market	0–7	Ipswich Town	Needham Market
13:00 BST		Report	Penney 18'; Hughes 33'; Chaplin 49', 54', 60'; Ladapo 50'; Leigh 58'	Stadium: Bloomfields
Note: 60-minute match

2 July 2022 Friendly	Arsenal	5–1	Ipswich Town	London Colney
12:30 BST	Nketiah 1', 30', 36'; Lokonga 24'; Balogun 74'	Report	Aluko 77'	Stadium: Arsenal Training Centre; Attendance: 0 (behind-closed-doors)

12 July 2022 Friendly	Ipswich Town	1–2	West Ham United	Ipswich
19:00 BST	Vincent-Young 75'	Report	Zouma 31'; Chesters 63'	Stadium: Portman Road; Attendance: 15,129

16 July 2022 Friendly	Crystal Palace	4–2	Ipswich Town	Beckenham
11:00 BST	Plange 9', 12', 57'; Benteke 42'	Report	Ball 70'; Aluko 79'	Stadium: Crystal Palace FC Training Ground; Attendance: 0 (behind-closed-doors)

16 July 2022 Friendly	AFC Wimbledon	0–3	Ipswich Town	Wimbledon
14:30 BST		Report	Morsy 12', 57'; John-Jules 48'	Stadium: Plough Lane

23 July 2022 Friendly	Millwall	1–1	Ipswich Town	Bermondsey
15:00 BST	Afobe 16'	Report	Ladapo 54'	Stadium: The Den; Attendance: 2,430

26 July 2022 Friendly	Ipswich Town	3–1	Southend United	Ipswich
19:00 BST	John-Jules 6'; Leigh 57'; Ladapo 90'	Report	Powell 77'	Stadium: Portman Road; Attendance: 4,616

== Competitions ==
=== Overall record ===
Competition	First match	Last match	Starting round	Record							
Competition	First match	Last match	Starting round	Pld	W	D	L	GF	GA	GD	Win %
League One	August 2022	May 2023	Matchday 1	46	28	14	4	101	35	+66	60.87
FA Cup	November 2022	February 2023	First round	5	3	1	1	12	3	+9	60.00
EFL Cup	August 2022	August 2022	First round	1	0	0	1	0	1	−1	0.00
EFL Trophy	August 2022	November 2022	Group stage	4	2	0	2	8	3	+5	50.00
Total				56	33	15	8	121	42	+79	58.93

Last updated: 7 May 2023
Source: [Soccerway]

=== League One ===
==== League table ====
Pos	Team	Pld	W	D	L	GF	GA	GD	Pts	Promotion, qualification or relegation
1	Plymouth Argyle (C, P)	46	31	8	7	82	47	+35	101	Promotion to EFL Championship
2	Ipswich Town (P)	46	28	14	4	101	35	+66	98	Promotion to EFL Championship
3	Sheffield Wednesday (O, P)	46	28	12	6	81	37	+44	96	Qualification for League One play-offs
4	Barnsley	46	26	8	12	80	47	+33	86	Qualification for League One play-offs
5	Bolton Wanderers	46	23	12	11	62	36	+26	81	Qualification for League One play-offs
6	Peterborough United	46	24	5	17	75	54	+21	77	Qualification for League One play-offs

Source: EFL Official Website
Rules for classification: 1) Points; 2) Goal difference; 3) Number of goals scored; 4) Head-to-head results; 5) Wins; 6) Away goals; 7) Penalty points (sec 9.5); 8) 12-point sending off offences
(C) Champions; (O) Play-off winners; (P) Promoted

==== Results summary ====
Overall								Home						Away					
Pld	W	D	L	GF	GA	GD	Pts	W	D	L	GF	GA	GD	W	D	L	GF	GA	GD
46	28	14	4	101	35	+66	98	16	6	1	60	13	+47	12	8	3	41	22	+19

Last updated: 7 May 2023.
Source: [ Soccerway]

==== Results by round ====
Round	1	2	3	4	5	6	7	8	9	10	11	12	13	14	15	16	17	18	19	20	21	22	23	24	25	26	27	28	29	30	31	32	33	34	35	36	37	38	39	40	41	42	43	44	45	46
Ground	H	A	H	A	A	H	A	H	A	A	H	H	A	H	H	A	A	H	A	H	H	A	H	A	A	H	A	H	A	H	A	H	A	H	H	A	H	A	H	A	H	H	A	A	H	A
Result	D	W	W	W	W	D	W	W	D	L	W	W	W	L	W	W	D	D	W	D	W	L	W	D	D	D	L	W	D	D	D	W	W	W	W	W	W	W	W	D	W	W	W	W	W	D
Position	14	7	1	1	1	2	1	1	1	2	2	2	2	2	2	2	2	2	2	2	1	2	2	2	3	3	3	3	3	3	4	3	3	3	3	3	3	3	2	3	2	2	2	2	2	2

Updated to match(es) played on 7 May 2023. Source: [ Soccerway]
A = Away; H = Home; W = Win; D = Draw; L = Loss; P = Postponed

==== Matches ====
Win Draw Loss Fixtures

On 23 June, the league fixtures were announced.

30 July 2022 1	Ipswich Town	1–1	Bolton Wanderers	Ipswich
15:00 BST	Evans 38'; Davis (yellow card) 43'; Woolfenden (yellow card) 74'	Report	Morley 25' (pen.); John (yellow card) 33'; Bradley (yellow card) 64'	Stadium: Portman Road; Attendance: 26,688; Referee: Sam Barrott

6 August 2022 2	Forest Green Rovers	1–2	Ipswich Town	Nailsworth
15:00 BST	Stevenson (yellow card) 50'; March 64'; Brown (yellow card) 78'	Report	Harness 37'; Morsy 45+4'; Burgess (yellow card) 90+1'	Stadium: The New Lawn; Attendance: 4,015; Referee: Craig Hicks

13 August 2022 3	Ipswich Town	3–0	Milton Keynes Dons	Ipswich
15:00 BST	Burns 5'; Harness 28'; Chaplin 60'	Report	Robson (yellow card) 59'	Stadium: Portman Road; Attendance: 23,045; Referee: Carl Brook

16 August 2022 4	Burton Albion	0–1	Ipswich Town	Burton upon Trent
19:45 BST	Ahadme (yellow card) 90+1'	Report	Edmundson (yellow card) 45'; Harness 60'; Leigh (yellow card) 90+6'	Stadium: Pirelli Stadium; Attendance: 3,562; Referee: Ben Toner

20 August 2022 5	Shrewsbury Town	0–3	Ipswich Town	Shrewsbury
15:00 BST	Bayliss (yellow card) 51'	Report	Morsy (yellow card) 16'; John-Jules 22'; Chaplin 52'; Jackson 90+2'	Stadium: Montgomery Waters Meadow; Attendance: 6,556; Referee: Will Finnie

27 August 2022 6	Ipswich Town	2–2	Barnsley	Ipswich
15:00 BST	Chaplin 27', (yellow card) 71'; Edmundson (yellow card) 68'; Morsy 70'	Report	Aitchison 33'; Styles (yellow card) 59', (goal) 75'; Wolfe (yellow card) 81'; Norwood (yellow card) 87'; Andersen (yellow card) 90'	Stadium: Portman Road; Attendance: 25,001; Referee: Steve Martin

3 September 2022 7	Accrington Stanley	0–2	Ipswich Town	Accrington
15:00 BST	Leigh (yellow card) 56'; Tharme (yellow card) 79'; Hamilton (yellow card) 85'	Report	Woolfenden (yellow card) 14'; Davis (yellow card) 20'; Burns (yellow card) 73', Chaplin 76', 87'	Stadium: Wham Stadium; Attendance: 3,069; Referee: Anthony Backhouse

13 September 2022 8	Ipswich Town	2–0	Bristol Rovers	Ipswich
19:45 BST	Morsy (yellow card) 15'; Chaplin 24'; Harness (yellow card) 50'; Evans 55'; John-Jules (yellow card) 86'	Report	Hoole (yellow card) 66'; Thomas (yellow card) 81' (yellow-red card) 85'; Kilgour (red card) 90+2'	Stadium: Portman Road; Attendance: 22,209; Referee: Tom Nield

17 September 2022 9	Sheffield Wednesday	2–2	Ipswich Town	Owlerton
15:00 BST	Bannan (yellow card) 24'; Byers 75'; James (yellow card) 79'; Smith 89'	Report	Jackson 4'; Woolfenden (yellow card) 43'; Davis (yellow card) 52'; Leigh (yellow card) 62'; Iorfa 71' (o.g.); Burns (yellow card) 74'; Morsy (yellow card) 76'; Harness (yellow card) 82'	Stadium: Hillsborough; Attendance: 26,281; Referee: Peter Wright

25 September 2022 10	Plymouth Argyle	2–1	Ipswich Town	Plymouth
12:30 BST	Mumba 69'; Whittaker 75'	Report	Harness (yellow card) 20'; Morsy (yellow card) 22'; Ladapo 39'; Edmundson (yellow card) 66'; Evans (yellow card) 71'	Stadium: Home Park; Attendance: 15,480; Referee: Scott Oldham

1 October 2022 11	Ipswich Town	3–2	Portsmouth	Ipswich
15:00 BST	Harness 25'; Walton (yellow card) 31'; Ladapo 74'; Burns 80'	Report	Scarlett (yellow card) 10'; Bishop 32' (pen.) 79' (pen.); Robertson (yellow card) 85'	Stadium: Portman Road; Attendance: 28,434; Referee: Charles Breakspear

4 October 2022 12	Ipswich Town	3–0	Cambridge United	Ipswich
19:45 BST	John-Jules 72' (yellow card) 90+4'; Edwards 75' 86'	Report		Stadium: Portman Road; Attendance: 26,414; Referee: Robert Lewis
Note: Fixture was originally scheduled for 10 September but was postponed as a mark of respect following the passing of Queen Elizabeth II.

8 October 2022 13	Morecambe	1–2	Ipswich Town	Morecambe
15:00 BST	Fané (yellow card) 23'; Delaney (yellow card) 32'; Phillips 34'; Bedeau (yellow card) 62'; Rawson (yellow card) 72'; Love (yellow card) 90+8'	Report	Edmundson 54'; Chaplin (penalty missed) 58'; Evans 65' (pen.) (yellow card) 71'	Stadium: Mazuma Stadium; Attendance: 4,776; Referee: Thomas Kirk

15 October 2022 14	Ipswich Town	0–1	Lincoln City	Ipswich
15:00 BST	Evans (yellow card) 44'	Report	House 24'	Stadium: Portman Road; Attendance: 27,608; Referee: Andy Davies

21 October 2022 15	Ipswich Town	1–0	Derby County	Ipswich
20:00 BST	Morsy (yellow card) 10'; Burns 67'; Jackson (penalty missed) 85'	Report	Chester (yellow card) 23'; Mendez-Laing (yellow card) 51'	Stadium: Portman Road; Attendance: 28,415; Referee: Lee Swabey

25 October 2022 16	Port Vale	2–3	Ipswich Town	Burslem
19:45 BST	Massey 45+6'; Smith 47'	Report	Ladapo 34', 51'; Humphreys 38'	Stadium: Vale Park; Attendance: 7,928; Referee: Andrew Kitchen

29 October 2022 17	Charlton Athletic	4–4	Ipswich Town	Charlton
15:00 BST	Clare (yellow card) 17'; Dobson (yellow card) 50' (goal) 90+9'; Rak-Sakyi 63'; Morgan 76'; Thomas 90+6'	Report	Ball (yellow card) 11'; Edmundson 45+3'; John-Jules (yellow card) 45+3' (goal) 52'; Morsy (yellow card) 58' (goal) 90+4'; Walton (yellow card) 63'; Burns (yellow card) 83'; Ladapo 90+1'	Stadium: The Valley; Attendance: 16,645; Referee: Josh Smith

12 November 2022 18	Ipswich Town	1–1	Cheltenham Town	Ipswich
15:00 GMT	Woolfenden 8'; Morsy (yellow card) 89'	Report	Broom 34'; Southwood (yellow card) 39'; Adshead (yellow card) 86'; Freestone (yellow card) 88'	Stadium: Portman Road; Attendance: 25,400; Referee: Geoff Eltringham

19 November 2022 19	Exeter City	0–2	Ipswich Town	Exeter
12:00 GMT	Sparkes (yellow card) 45+1'	Report	Ladapo 11'; Harness 68' (yellow card) 86'; Burns (yellow card) 90'	Stadium: St James Park; Attendance: 7,232; Referee: Alan Young

2 December 2022 20	Ipswich Town	1–1	Fleetwood Town	Ipswich
19:45 GMT	Woolfenden 2'; Burns (yellow card) 21'	Report	Rooney (yellow card) 5'; Batty (yellow card) 66'; Hayes 90+6'; Earl (red card) 90+6'	Stadium: Portman Road; Attendance: 22,801; Referee: Sam Purkiss

10 December 2022 21	Ipswich Town	2–1	Peterborough United	Ipswich
12:30 GMT	Chaplin 21', 58'; Morsy (yellow card) 62'; Vincent-Young (yellow card) 66'; Jackson (yellow card) 71'	Report	Kent 31'	Stadium: Portman Road; Attendance: 24,849; Referee: Ollie Yates

17 December 2022 22	Wycombe Wanderers	1–0	Ipswich Town	High Wycombe
15:00 GMT	Wing (yellow card) 28'; Hanlan 40'; Mehmeti (yellow card) 61'; McCleary (yellow card) 73'; Mawson (yellow card) 88'	Report		Stadium: Adams Park; Attendance: 7,602; Referee: Ben Toner

26 December 2022 23	Ipswich Town	3–0	Oxford United	Ipswich
15:00 GMT	Ladapo 39'; Burns 45'; Chaplin 81'; Vincent-Young (yellow card) 90+1'	Report	Taylor (yellow card) 36'; Henry (yellow card) 51'	Stadium: Portman Road; Attendance: 28,072; Referee: Will Finnie

29 December 2022 24	Portsmouth	2–2	Ipswich Town	Milton
19:45 GMT	Pack 4' (yellow card) 78'; Bishop 60'	Report	Burgess 11' (yellow card) 16'; Chaplin 87'	Stadium: Fratton Park; Attendance: 18,849; Referee: Sam Allison

2 January 2023 25	Lincoln City	1–1	Ipswich Town	Lincoln
15:00 GMT	Jackson (red card) 45'; Sanders (yellow card) 58'; Diamond 64' (pen.); Rushworth (yellow card) 69'	Report	Evans (yellow card) 21'; Humphreys 81'	Stadium: Sincil Bank; Attendance: 10,115; Referee: Declan Bourne

14 January 2023 26	Ipswich Town	1–1	Plymouth Argyle	Ipswich
15:00 GMT	Burns (yellow card) 11' (goal) 63'; Hirst (yellow card) 87'	Report	Wilson (yellow card) 38'; Mumba 90+3'	Stadium: Portman Road; Attendance: 29,069; Referee: Andy Woolmer

21 January 2023 27	Oxford United	2–1	Ipswich Town	Littlemore
15:00 GMT	Wildschut 34'; Brannagan 83'	Report	Davis 38'; Donacien (yellow card) 81'	Stadium: The Kassam Stadium; Attendance: 9,830; Referee: Bobby Madden

24 January 2023 28	Ipswich Town	4–0	Morecambe	Ipswich
19:45 GMT	Ladapo 1', 16'; Chaplin 38', 45+6' (yellow card) 70'	Report	Bedeau (yellow card) 49'; Crowley (yellow card) 65'	Stadium: Portman Road; Attendance: 21,948; Referee: David Rock

4 February 2023 29	Cambridge United	1–1	Ipswich Town	Cambridge
15:00 GMT	Knibbs 24'; Ironside (penalty missed) 32'; Smith (yellow card) 90'; Digby (yellow card) 90+4'	Report	Edmundson (yellow card) 31'; Morsy (yellow card) 41'; Ladapo 54'	Stadium: Abbey Stadium; Attendance: 7,154; Referee: Sam Barrott

11 February 2023 30	Ipswich Town	2–2	Sheffield Wednesday	Ipswich
15:00 GMT	Chaplin (penalty missed) 19'; Broadhead 43'; Davis 51'	Report	Smith 27'; Vaulks (yellow card) 33'; Byers 34', (yellow card) 50'	Stadium: Portman Road; Attendance: 29,072; Referee: Geoff Eltringham

14 February 2023 31	Bristol Rovers	0–0	Ipswich Town	Horfield
19:45 GMT		Report	Clarke (yellow card) 86'	Stadium: Memorial Stadium; Attendance: 8,542; Referee: Paul Howard

18 February 2023 32	Ipswich Town	4–0	Forest Green Rovers	Ipswich
15:00 GMT	Chaplin 3', 60'; Broadhead 41'; Ladapo 79'	Report	Stevenson (yellow card) 78'; Cooper (yellow card) 90+3'	Stadium: Portman Road; Attendance: 24,804; Referee: Carl Brook

25 February 2023 33	Milton Keynes Dons	0–1	Ipswich Town	Denbigh
15:00 GMT	McEachran (yellow card) 41'; Burns (yellow card) 86'	Report	Morsy 26'; Humphreys (yellow card) 45+1'; Chaplin (yellow card) 88'	Stadium: Stadium MK; Attendance: 14,046; Referee: Rebecca Welch

4 March 2023 34	Ipswich Town	4–0	Burton Albion	Ipswich
15:00 GMT	Clarke (yellow card) 15'; Chaplin 31', 69'; Broadhead 38'; Ladapo 42'	Report	Moon (yellow card) 18'; Brayford (yellow card) 19'; Hamer (yellow card) 42'; Shaughnessy (yellow card) 65'	Stadium: Portman Road; Attendance: 25,003; Referee: Carl Boyeson

7 March 2023 35	Ipswich Town	3–0	Accrington Stanley	Ipswich
19:45 GMT	Broadhead 12'; Burgess (yellow card) 42'; Jackson 56'; Edwards 90+4'	Report	Jensen (red card) 90+1'; Fernandes (yellow card) 90+4'	Stadium: Portman Road; Attendance: 22,413; Referee: Lee Swabey

11 March 2023 36	Bolton Wanderers	0–2	Ipswich Town	Horwich
15:00 GMT	Morley (yellow card) 29'; Charles (penalty missed) 52'; Dempsey (yellow card) 82'	Report	Hirst 44' (yellow card) 65'; Luongo (yellow card) 45+1'; Walton (yellow card) 50'; Woolfenden (yellow card) 52'; Broadhead (yellow card) 64'; Burgess 68'	Stadium: University of Bolton Stadium; Attendance: 20,532; Referee: Neil Hair

18 March 2023 37	Ipswich Town	2–0	Shrewsbury Town	Ipswich
15:00 GMT	Hirst 15'; Luongo 51'; Broadhead (yellow card) 68'; Davis (yellow card) 90+3'	Report	Shipley (yellow card) 21'; Pyke (yellow card) 43'; Pennington (yellow card) 56'; Saydee (yellow card) 83'; Moore (yellow card) 89'	Stadium: Portman Road; Attendance: 26,432; Referee: Ollie Yates

1 April 2023 38	Derby County	0–2	Ipswich Town	Derby
15:00 GMT	Cashin (yellow card) 3'; McGoldrick (yellow card) 23'; Smith (yellow card) 60'; White (yellow card) 85'	Report	Chaplin 17'; Clarke (yellow card) 41'; Walton (yellow card) 51'; Hirst 76'; Burns (yellow card) 90+1'	Stadium: Pride Park Stadium; Attendance: 29,691; Referee: Anthony Backhouse

7 April 2023 39	Ipswich Town	4–0	Wycombe Wanderers	Ipswich
15:00 GMT	Hirst 38'; Chaplin 45'; Burns 57'; Ladapo 76' (pen.)	Report	Forino-Joseph (yellow card) 52'; Tafazolli (yellow card) 89'	Stadium: Portman Road; Attendance: 28,511; Referee: David Rock

10 April 2023 40	Cheltenham Town	1–1	Ipswich Town	Cheltenham
15:00 GMT	Bradbury (yellow card) 7'; May 84'	Report	Morsy (yellow card) 36'; Chaplin 64'	Stadium: The Completely Suzuki Stadium; Attendance: 5,445; Referee: Seb Stockbridge

15 April 2023 41	Ipswich Town	6–0	Charlton Athletic	Ipswich
15:00 GMT	Chaplin 7', 14', 70'; Woolfenden (yellow card) 45+3'; Ladapo 75', 84'; Davis 90+5'	Report	Hector (yellow card) 57'; Dobson (yellow card) 64'; Inniss (yellow card) 69' (red card) 87'	Stadium: Portman Road; Attendance: 29,011; Referee: Sam Barrott

18 April 2023 42	Ipswich Town	2–1	Port Vale	Ipswich
19:45 GMT	Broadhead 53', 84' (pen.); Chaplin (yellow card) 83'	Report	Stone (yellow card) 38'; Benning 45+2'; Forrester (yellow card) 68'; Plant (yellow card) 73'	Stadium: Portman Road; Attendance: 27,696; Referee: Robert Lewis

22 April 2023 43	Peterborough United	0–3	Ipswich Town	Peterborough
15:00 GMT	Norburn (yellow card) 11'	Report	Burns 17' (yellow card) 74'; Morsy (yellow card) 44'; Chaplin 57' (yellow card) 69'; Ladapo 82'	Stadium: London Road Stadium; Attendance: 12,785; Referee: Gavin Ward

25 April 2023 44	Barnsley	0–3	Ipswich Town	Barnsley
19:45 GMT	Russell (yellow card) 25'; Cole (yellow card) 64'; Benson (yellow card) 90+1'	Report	Hirst (yellow card) 9', (goal) 45+2'; Broadhead 44', (penalty missed) 55'; Morsy (yellow card) 80'; Chaplin 81'; Walton (yellow card) 83'	Stadium: Oakwell Stadium; Attendance: 17,018; Referee: Ben Toner

29 April 2023 45	Ipswich Town	6–0	Exeter City	Ipswich
15:00 BST	Chaplin 8', 32'; Luongo 16'; Hirst 22'; Broadhead 28' (pen.); Burns 47'; Clarke (yellow card) 57'; Burgess (yellow card) 88'	Report	Mitchell (yellow card) 59'	Stadium: Portman Road; Attendance: 29,334 (919 away fans); Referee: Scott Oldham

7 May 2023 46	Fleetwood Town	2–2	Ipswich Town	Fleetwood
12:00 GMT	Marriott 57', 69'	Report	Ladapo 50'; Luongo (yellow card) 54'; Harness 73', (yellow card) 75'; Ball (yellow card) 79'; Clarke (yellow card) 85' (yellow-red card) 90+2'	Stadium: Highbury Stadium; Attendance: 4,979; Referee: Ross Joyce

=== FA Cup ===
Town were drawn away to Bracknell Town in the first round and at home to Buxton in the second round, Rotherham United in the third round and to Burnley in the fourth round.

Win Draw Loss Fixtures

7 November 2022 First round	Bracknell Town	0–3	Ipswich Town	Sandhurst
19:45 GMT	Dean (yellow card) 24'	Report	Bayliss 66' (o.g.); Ladapo 73'; Camará 81'	Stadium: Bottom Meadow; Attendance: 1,950; Referee: Charles Breakspear

27 November 2022 Second round	Ipswich Town	4–0	Buxton	Ipswich
17:00 GMT	Davis (yellow card) 27'; Chaplin 33', 73'; Ahadme 38'; Chirewa (yellow card) 49'; Morsy (yellow card) 55'; Jackson 90+2'	Report	Brisley (yellow card) 23'; McKay (yellow card) 28'	Stadium: Portman Road; Attendance: 9,817; Referee: Ross Joyce

7 January 2023 Third round	Ipswich Town	4–1	Rotherham United	Ipswich
15:00 GMT	Humphreys 43'; Keogh (yellow card) 47'; Chaplin 74' (pen.); Ladapo 79'; Burns 87' (pen.)	Report	Washington 47' (pen.); Rathbone (yellow card) 54'; Wood (yellow card) 89'	Stadium: Portman Road; Attendance: 15,728; Referee: Seb Stockbridge

28 January 2023 Fourth round	Ipswich Town	0–0	Burnley	Ipswich
15:00 GMT	Harness (yellow card) 26'; Morsy (yellow card) 71'	Report	Beyer (yellow card) 13'; Cork (yellow card) 88'	Stadium: Portman Road; Attendance: 25,420; Referee: Tom Nield

7 February 2023 Fourth round replay	Burnley	2–1	Ipswich Town	Burnley
19:45 GMT	Tella 2', 90+4'; Cork (yellow card) 33'; Vitinho (yellow card) 36'	Report	Hirst 3', (yellow card) 52'; Aluko (yellow card) 60'; Chaplin (yellow card) 90+7'	Stadium: Turf Moor; Attendance: 11,543; Referee: Scott Oldham

=== EFL Cup ===
Ipswich were drawn at home to Colchester United in the first round.

Win Draw Loss Fixtures

9 August 2022 First round	Ipswich Town	0–1	Colchester United	Ipswich
19:45 BST	Woolfenden (yellow card) 90+3'	Report	Hannant 29'; Skuse (yellow card) 38'; Ashley (yellow card) 56'; Hannant (yellow card) 76'	Stadium: Portman Road; Attendance: 11,654; Referee: Sam Purkiss

=== EFL Trophy ===
On 20 June, the initial Group stage draw was made, grouping Ipswich Town with Cambridge United and Northampton Town. Three days later, Arsenal U21s joined Southern Group H. In the second round, Town were drawn against Portsmouth at home.

Pos	Div	Team	Pld	W	PW	PL	L	GF	GA	GD	Pts	Qualification
1	L1	Ipswich Town	3	2	0	0	1	8	1	+7	6	Advance to Round 2
2	ACA	Arsenal U21	3	2	0	0	1	5	3	+2	6	Advance to Round 2
3	L1	Cambridge United	3	2	0	0	1	3	2	+1	6	
4	L2	Northampton Town	3	0	0	0	3	1	11	−10	0	

Source: EFL.com

Win Draw Loss Fixtures

30 August 2022 Group stage	Ipswich Town	6–0	Northampton Town	Ipswich
19:45 BST	Harness 11', 16'; Leigh 26'; Ball (yellow card) 44'; Burgess 58'; Edmundson 83'; Ladapo 90+1'	Report		Stadium: Portman Road; Attendance: 5,342; Referee: Tom Reeves

20 September 2022 Group stage	Ipswich Town	2–0	Arsenal U21	Ipswich
19:45 BST	Ball 3', (yellow card) 80'; Edwards (yellow card) 21'; Edmundson (yellow card) 71'; Ladapo 85'	Report		Stadium: Portman Road; Attendance: 5,236; Referee: James Oldham

18 October 2022 Group stage	Cambridge United	1–0	Ipswich Town	Cambridge
19:00 BST	Taylor (yellow card) 29'; Simper 79'; Brophy (yellow card) 85'	Report	Edwards (yellow card) 7' (yellow-red card) 17'; Woolfenden (yellow card) 45+3'; Chirewa (yellow card) 73'	Stadium: The Abbey Stadium; Attendance: 2,548; Referee: Thomas Parsons

22 November 2022 Second round	Ipswich Town	0–2	Portsmouth	Ipswich
19:45 GMT	Morsy (yellow card) 45+3'	Report	Scarlett 43'; Morrison (yellow card) 60'; Dale (yellow card) 61'; Koroma (yellow card) 81'; Swanson 90+4'	Stadium: Portman Road; Attendance: 5,686; Referee: Tom Nield

== Squad statistics ==
All statistics updated as of end of season

=== Appearances and goals ===
No.	Pos	Nat	Player	Total		League One		FA Cup		EFL Cup		EFL Trophy	
No.	Pos	Nat	Player	Apps	Goals	Apps	Goals	Apps	Goals	Apps	Goals	Apps	Goals
Goalkeepers
1	GK	(England) ENG	Christian Walton	47	0	46	0	1	0	0	0	0	0
13	GK	(England) ENG	Joel Coleman	0	0	0	0	0	0	0	0	0	0
31	GK	(Czech Republic) CZE	Václav Hladký	10	0	0+1	0	4	0	1	0	4	0
Defenders
2	DF	(Republic of Ireland) IRL	Richard Keogh	16	0	4+5	0	3	0	0	0	4	0
3	DF	(England) ENG	Leif Davis	46	3	43	3	2	0	0	0	1	0
4	DF	(England) ENG	George Edmundson	25	3	17+1	2	3	0	0	0	2+2	1
6	DF	(England) ENG	Luke Woolfenden	47	2	41	2	2+1	0	1	0	2	0
15	DF	(Australia) AUS	Cameron Burgess	38	3	30+3	2	2	0	1	0	1+1	1
21	DF	(Jamaica) JAM	Greg Leigh	20	1	3+11	0	2+1	0	1	0	2	1
24	DF	(England) ENG	Kane Vincent-Young	26	0	2+16	0	3	0	1	0	4	0
34	DF	(England) ENG	Harry Clarke	20	0	16+4	0	0	0	0	0	0	0
36	DF	(England) ENG	Albie Armin	3	0	0	0	0+1	0	0	0	0+2	0
39	DF	(Republic of Ireland) IRL	Edwin Agbaje	2	0	0	0	0+1	0	0	0	1	0
44	DF	(Saint Lucia) LCA	Janoi Donacien	42	0	29+9	0	3	0	0	0	0+1	0
Midfielders
5	MF	(Egypt) EGY	Sam Morsy	49	4	44	4	4	0	0	0	1	0
7	MF	(Wales) WAL	Wes Burns	48	9	41+1	8	1+2	1	0+1	0	0+2	0
8	MF	(Wales) WAL	Lee Evans	27	3	21+2	3	2	0	0+1	0	1	0
11	MF	(Republic of Ireland) IRL	Marcus Harness	46	8	21+18	6	2+1	0	0+1	0	3	2
12	MF	(England) ENG	Dominic Ball	19	1	4+12	0	1	0	0	0	2	1
25	MF	(Australia) AUS	Massimo Luongo	16	2	13+2	2	0+1	0	0	0	0	0
28	MF	(Guinea-Bissau) GNB	Panutche Camará	4	1	0+1	0	0+1	1	0	0	1+1	0
29	MF	(England) ENG	Kyle Edwards	41	3	3+29	3	2+3	0	1	0	3	0
30	MF	(England) ENG	Cameron Humphreys	26	3	10+7	2	4	1	1	0	4	0
37	MF	(England) ENG	Fraser Alexander	1	0	0	0	0	0	0	0	0+1	0
38	MF	(England) ENG	Zanda Siziba	2	0	0	0	0	0	0	0	0+2	0
41	MF	(England) ENG	Matt Ward	1	0	0	0	0+1	0	0	0	0	0
42	MF	(England) ENG	Tawanda Chirewa	2	0	0	0	0+1	0	0	0	1	0
Forwards
9	FW	(England) ENG	Freddie Ladapo	53	21	23+23	17	2+2	2	0	0	1+2	2
10	FW	(England) ENG	Conor Chaplin	52	29	41+4	26	2+3	3	0+1	0	1	0
14	FW	(England) ENG	Tyreece John-Jules	21	3	8+9	3	0	0	1	0	1+2	0
19	FW	(England) ENG	Kayden Jackson	48	4	11+27	3	4+1	1	1	0	3+1	0
23	FW	(Nigeria) NGA	Sone Aluko	19	0	4+10	0	3	0	1	0	1	0
27	FW	(England) ENG	George Hirst	23	7	14+7	6	2	1	0	0	0	0
33	FW	(Wales) WAL	Nathan Broadhead	21	8	17+2	8	0+2	0	0	0	0	0
40	FW	(England) ENG	Gerard Buabo	2	0	0	0	0+1	0	0	0	0+1	0
Players transferred out during the season
16	MF	(England) ENG	Rekeem Harper	1	0	0	0	0	0	1	0	0	0
18	FW	(Morocco) MAR	Gassan Ahadme	8	1	0+6	0	1+1	1	0	0	0	0
22	MF	(Tunisia) TUN	Idris El Mizouni	1	0	0	0	0	0	0+1	0	0	0

Last updated: end of season
Source: Competitions

=== Goalscorers ===
No.	Pos	Nat	Player	League One	FA Cup	EFL Cup	EFL Trophy	Total
10	FW	(England)	Conor Chaplin	26	3	0	0	29
9	FW	(England)	Freddie Ladapo	17	2	0	2	21
7	MF	(Wales)	Wes Burns	8	1	0	0	9
11	MF	(Republic of Ireland)	Marcus Harness	6	0	0	2	8
33	FW	(Wales)	Nathan Broadhead	8	0	0	0	8
27	FW	(England)	George Hirst	6	1	0	0	7
5	MF	(Egypt)	Sam Morsy	4	0	0	0	4
19	FW	(England)	Kayden Jackson	3	1	0	0	4
3	DF	(England)	Leif Davis	3	0	0	0	3
4	DF	(England)	George Edmundson	2	0	0	1	3
8	MF	(Wales)	Lee Evans	3	0	0	0	3
14	FW	(England)	Tyreece John-Jules	3	0	0	0	3
15	DF	(Australia)	Cameron Burgess	2	0	0	1	3
29	MF	(England)	Kyle Edwards	3	0	0	0	3
30	MF	(England)	Cameron Humphreys	2	1	0	0	3
6	DF	(England)	Luke Woolfenden	2	0	0	0	2
25	MF	(Australia)	Massimo Luongo	2	0	0	0	2
12	MF	(England)	Dominic Ball	0	0	0	1	1
18	FW	(Morocco)	Gassan Ahadme	0	1	0	0	1
21	DF	(Jamaica)	Greg Leigh	0	0	0	1	1
28	MF	(Guinea-Bissau)	Panutche Camará	0	1	0	0	1
Own goal				1	1	0	0	2
Total				101	12	0	8	121

=== Assists ===
No.	Pos	Nat	Player	League One	FA Cup	EFL Cup	EFL Trophy	Total
3	DF	(England)	Leif Davis	14	0	0	0	14
7	MF	(Wales)	Wes Burns	11	2	0	0	13
29	MF	(England)	Kyle Edwards	1	1	0	4	6
33	FW	(Wales)	Nathan Broadhead	6	0	0	0	6
5	MF	(Egypt)	Sam Morsy	5	0	0	0	5
10	FW	(England)	Conor Chaplin	5	0	0	0	5
12	MF	(England)	Dominic Ball	2	0	0	2	4
44	DF	(Saint Lucia)	Janoi Donacien	4	0	0	0	4
19	FW	(England)	Kayden Jackson	1	2	0	0	3
8	MF	(Wales)	Lee Evans	2	0	0	0	2
9	FW	(England)	Freddie Ladapo	2	0	0	0	2
11	MF	(Republic of Ireland)	Marcus Harness	2	0	0	0	2
27	FW	(England)	George Hirst	2	0	0	0	2
6	DF	(England)	Luke Woolfenden	1	0	0	0	1
15	DF	(Australia)	Cameron Burgess	1	0	0	0	1
21	DF	(Jamaica)	Greg Leigh	1	0	0	0	1
23	FW	(Nigeria)	Sone Aluko	1	0	0	0	1
24	DF	(England)	Kane Vincent-Young	0	1	0	0	1
30	DF	(England)	Cameron Humphreys	0	0	0	1	1
34	DF	(England)	Harry Clarke	1	0	0	0	1
Total				63	6	0	7	76

=== Clean sheets ===
No.	Nat	Player	League One	FA Cup	EFL Cup	EFL Trophy	Total
1	(England)	Christian Walton	23	1	0	0	24
31	(Czech Republic)	Václav Hladký	0	2	0	2	4
Total			23	3	0	2	28

=== Disciplinary record ===
No.	Pos	Nat	Player	League One		FA Cup		EFL Cup		EFL Trophy		Total	
No.	Pos	Nat	Player	Booked	Sent off (straight red)	Booked	Sent off (straight red)	Booked	Sent off (straight red)	Booked	Sent off (straight red)	Booked	Sent off (straight red)
1	GK	(England)	Christian Walton	5	0	0	0	0	0	0	0	5	0
2	DF	(Republic of Ireland)	Richard Keogh	0	0	1	0	0	0	0	0	1	0
3	DF	(England)	Leif Davis	3	0	1	0	0	0	0	0	4	0
4	DF	(England)	George Edmundson	4	0	0	0	0	0	0	0	4	0
5	MF	(Egypt)	Sam Morsy	12	0	2	0	0	0	1	0	15	0
6	DF	(England)	Luke Woolfenden	5	0	0	0	1	0	1	0	7	0
7	MF	(Wales)	Wes Burns	8	0	0	0	0	0	0	0	8	0
8	MF	(Wales)	Lee Evans	4	0	0	0	0	0	0	0	4	0
10	FW	(England)	Conor Chaplin	5	0	1	0	0	0	0	0	6	0
11	MF	(Republic of Ireland)	Marcus Harness	5	0	1	0	0	0	0	0	6	0
12	MF	(England)	Dominic Ball	2	0	0	0	0	0	2	0	4	0
14	FW	(England)	Tyreece John-Jules	3	0	0	0	0	0	0	0	3	0
15	DF	(Australia)	Cameron Burgess	4	0	0	0	0	0	0	0	4	0
19	FW	(England)	Kayden Jackson	1	0	0	0	0	0	0	0	1	0
21	DF	(Jamaica)	Greg Leigh	2	0	0	0	0	0	0	0	2	0
23	FW	(Nigeria)	Sone Aluko	0	0	1	0	0	0	0	0	1	0
24	DF	(England)	Kane Vincent-Young	2	0	0	0	0	0	0	0	2	0
25	MF	(Australia)	Massimo Luongo	2	0	0	0	0	0	0	0	2	0
27	FW	(England)	George Hirst	3	0	1	0	0	0	0	0	4	0
29	MF	(England)	Kyle Edwards	0	0	0	0	0	0	2	1	2	1
30	MF	(England)	Cameron Humphreys	1	0	0	0	0	0	0	0	1	0
33	FW	(Wales)	Nathan Broadhead	2	0	0	0	0	0	0	0	2	0
34	DF	(England)	Harry Clarke	5	1	0	0	0	0	0	0	5	1
42	MF	(England)	Tawanda Chirewa	0	0	1	0	0	0	1	0	2	0
44	DF	(Saint Lucia)	Janoi Donacien	1	0	0	0	0	0	0	0	1	0
Total				78	1	9	0	1	0	7	1	95	2

=== Captains ===
No.	Nat	Player	League One	FA Cup	EFL Cup	EFL Trophy	Total	Notes
1	(England)	Christian Walton	1	0	0	0	1	
2	(Republic of Ireland)	Richard Keogh	0	0	0	1	1	
5	(Egypt)	Sam Morsy	44	4	0	1	49	Club captain
8	(Wales)	Lee Evans	0	1	0	1	2	
23	(Nigeria)	Sone Aluko	0	0	1	1	2	
44	(Saint Lucia)	Janoi Donacien	1	0	0	0	1	

== Awards ==
=== Player awards ===
Award	Player	Ref
Player of the Year	(England) Conor Chaplin	
Players' Player of the Year	(England) Conor Chaplin	
Young Player of the Year	(Republic of Ireland) Edwin Agbaje	
Goal of the Season	(England) Conor Chaplin	

=== EFL League One Manager of the Month ===
Month	Manager	Ref
March	(Northern Ireland) Kieran McKenna	
April	(Northern Ireland) Kieran McKenna	

=== EFL League One Player of the Month ===
Month	Player	Ref
December	(England) Conor Chaplin	
April	(England) Conor Chaplin	

=== PFA Fans' League One Player of the Month ===
Month	Player	Ref
August	(England) Conor Chaplin	
September	(England) Conor Chaplin	

=== EFL League One Goal of the Month ===
Award	Player	Ref
February	(Wales) Nathan Broadhead	

=== EFL League One Golden Boot ===
Player	Ref
(England) Conor Chaplin	

=== EFL League One Golden Glove ===
Player	Ref
(England) Christian Walton	

=== EFL League One Team of the Season ===
Player	Ref
(England) Leif Davis	
(England) Conor Chaplin	
