= Albie Armin =

English footballer (born 2004)

Personal information
- Full name: Albie Armin
- Date of birth: 12 April 2004 (age 22)
- Place of birth: Colchester, England
- Positions: Defender; midfielder

Team information
- Current team: Aveley

Youth career
- 2012–2022: Ipswich Town

Senior career*
Years	Team	Apps	(Gls)
2022–2023	Ipswich Town	0	(0)
2022	→ Braintree Town (loan)	1	(0)
2023–2025	Leiston	69	(3)
2025–	Aveley	0	(0)
- * Club domestic league appearances and goals as of 12:56, 6 June 2025 (UTC)

Albie Armin (born 12 April 2004) is an English semi-professional footballer who plays as a midfielder for Aveley.

== Career ==
Born in Colchester, Armin joined the Ipswich Town academy as an Under-8 in 2012. He signed a two-year professional contract in July 2021.

Armin made his senior debut for Ipswich Town on 14 September 2021 in a 2-1 home defeat to West Ham United Under-21s in the EFL Trophy group stage.

On 3 August 2022, he joined National League South club Braintree Town on loan for the first half of the 2022–23 season. He made his debut for Braintree Town on 6 August 2022, coming on as a substitute in a 2-1 away league defeat at Dulwich Hamlet. That was his only appearance for Braintree Town, and he soon returned to parent club Ipswich Town.

Armin made his first appearance for Ipswich Town against senior opposition on 18 October 2022, coming on as an 87th-minute substitute for Edwin Agbaje in a 1–0 away defeat at Cambridge United in the EFL Trophy group stage. The East Anglian Daily Times reported that "within seconds he had produced a perfectly-timed slide tackle to prevent a dangerous Cambridge counter-attack".

Armin made a total of 4 first team appearances for Ipswich Town, before being released at the end of the 2022-23 season. After unsuccessful trials at professional clubs West Bromwich Albion and Brentford, Armin signed for Southern Premier Central side Leiston on 11 September 2023.

Despite playing as a defender during his time at Ipswich Town, Armin played predominantly as a midfielder during his first season at Leiston, scoring 2 goals in 33 league appearances.

== Style of play ==
Armin's agency describes him as a left-sided "marauding centre-half with an excellent range of both short and long passing with the ability to shift and unlock teams". He's a midfielder, with good feet, calmness and control on the ball, and the ability to drive forward to get the team up the pitch. Also possesses a good shot.

== Career statistics ==
As of match played 27 April 2024

Appearances and goals by club, season and competition
Club	Season	League			FA Cup		EFL Cup		Other		Total	
Club	Season	Division	Apps	Goals	Apps	Goals	Apps	Goals	Apps	Goals	Apps	Goals
Ipswich Town	2021–22	EFL League One	0	0	0	0	0	0	1 (Note: Appearance(s) in EFL Trophy)	0	1	0
Ipswich Town	2022–23	EFL League One	0	0	1	0	0	0	2	0	3	0
Ipswich Town	Total		0	0	1	0	0	0	3	0	4	0
Braintree Town (loan)	2022–23	National League South	1	0	0	0	0	0	0	0	1	0
Leiston	2023-24	Southern Premier Central	33	2	0	0	0	0	0	0	33	2
Career total			34	2	1	0	0	0	3	0	38	2
