= 2021–22 Professional U23 Development League =

Premier League 2
- Season: 2021-22
- Champions: Manchester City U23s (2nd Title); Division 2 Fulham U23s (1st Title)
- Promoted: Fulham U23s; Wolverhampton Wanderers U23s
- Relegated: Leeds United U23s; Derby County U23s
- Matches: 395 (392 RS, 3 PO)
- Goals: 1,289 (3.26 per match) (1,283 RS, 6 PO)
- Best player: (England) James McAtee Manchester City U23s
- Top goalscorer: Overall (England) James McAtee Manchester City U23s, (Ghana) Jesurun Rak-Sakyi Crystal Palace U23s (18 Goals Each); Division 1 (England) James McAtee Manchester City U23s, (Ghana) Jesurun Rak-Sakyi Crystal Palace U23s (18 Goals Each); Division 2 (England) Abu Kamara Norwich City U23s (15 Goals)
- Biggest home win: Nottingham Forest U23s 7–0 Reading U23s (21 February 2022); Manchester City U23s 7–0 Everton U23s (29 April 2022)
- Biggest away win: Stoke City U23s 0–8 Aston Villa U23s (27 September 2021)
- Highest scoring: Leeds United U23s 4–4 Blackburn Rovers U23s (24 September 2021); Stoke City U23s 0–8 Aston Villa U23s (27 September 2021); Arsenal U23s 3–5 Derby County U23s (26 November 2021); Blackburn Rovers U23s 3–5 Manchester City U23s (9 January 2022); Liverpool U23s 7–1 Tottenham Hotspur U23s (12 March 2022); Fulham U23s 5–3 Burnley U23s (1 May 2022)
- Longest winning run: 6 Matches Manchester City U23s
- Longest unbeaten run: 12 Matches Manchester City U23s
- Longest winless run: 13 Matches Derby County U23s
- Longest losing run: 6 Matches Derby County U23s
- Highest attendance: 21,321 Leeds United U23s 1–3 Manchester City U23s (22 April 2022) League Record
- Lowest attendance: 31 Crystal Palace U23s 1–1 Arsenal U23s (19 March 2022)

The 2021–22 Professional U23 Development League was the tenth season of the Professional Development League system.

Nottingham Forest U23s and Birmingham City U23s both gained category one status. Manchester City U23s were the defending champions and successfully defend the title. Leeds United U23s and Crystal Palace U23s were both promoted and Southampton U23s were relegated.

== Premier League 2 ==
=== Division 1 ===
==== Table ====
Pos	Team	Pld	W	D	L	GF	GA	GD	Pts
1	Manchester City U23s (C)	26	16	6	4	65	32	+33	54
2	West Ham United U23s	26	15	3	8	59	39	+20	48
3	Arsenal U23s	26	10	11	5	56	48	+8	41
4	Liverpool U23s	26	11	7	8	47	37	+10	40
5	Manchester United U23s	26	11	6	9	46	43	+3	39
6	Tottenham Hotspur U23s	26	10	7	9	49	45	+4	37
7	Leicester City U23s	26	10	7	9	38	53	−15	37
8	Crystal Palace U23s	26	12	3	11	54	50	+4	39
9	Blackburn Rovers U23s	26	9	8	9	50	56	−6	35
10	Brighton & Hove Albion U23s	26	9	7	10	41	41	0	34
11	Everton U23s	26	8	5	13	33	54	−21	29
12	Chelsea U23s	26	7	7	12	39	47	−8	28
13	Leeds United U23s (R)	26	7	6	13	44	49	−5	27
14	Derby County U23s (R)	26	4	3	19	31	58	−27	15

(C) Champions; (R) Relegated

==== Results ====
Home \ Away	ARS	BLA	BHA	CHE	CRY	DER	EVE	LEE	LEI	LIV	MNC	MNU	TOT	WHU
Arsenal U23s		2–2	3–0	3–1	4–2	3–5	4–0	1–1	3–3	1–4	3–3	3–1	2–1	1–1
Blackburn Rovers U23s	2–3		6–0	4–3	2–1	2–1	2–2	4–0	1–1	2–2	3–5	0–4	3–3	2–0
Brighton & Hove Albion U23s	1–1	4–1		1–2	2–1	5–1	4–2	1–0	2–1	3–0	1–1	1–2	1–1	4–2
Chelsea U23s	1–6	0–1	1–1		1–2	2–0	1–1	1–0	5–0	4–3	0–1	1–1	2–1	1–1
Crystal Palace U23s	1–1	1–2	2–0	3–2		3–1	3–1	1–3	3–2	0–2	1–2	2–2	4–3	2–4
Derby County U23s	1–1	6–0	0–2	3–1	2–3		0–2	2–3	0–0	0–1	0–5	1–1	0–1	3–1
Everton U23s	2–0	0–2	2–1	2–0	2–2	1–0		4–2	1–2	1–3	3–2	0–1	1–0	3–4
Leeds United U23s	2–4	4–4	1–1	1–3	4–0	2–0	0–0		1–3	3–0	1–3	3–0	2–4	2–2
Leicester City U23s	1–1	4–1	2–1	1–1	1–6	2–1	3–1	1–0		0–4	0–0	3–2	1–4	2–1
Liverpool U23s	3–0	1–1	1–1	2–2	0–3	3–1	1–1	0–4	3–0		0–0	3–1	7–1	3–0
Manchester City U23s	2–2	4–2	3–1	4–1	4–2	1–0	7–0	3–2	5–0	0–0		3–1	1–3	2–0
Manchester United U23s	1–1	3–0	2–1	1–0	1–2	5–2	3–0	3–2	2–2	3–0	2–4		1–1	3–1
Tottenham Hotspur U23s	1–2	1–1	0–0	2–2	1–4	3–1	4–0	1–1	3–1	2–1	3–0	1–0		3–4
West Ham United U23s	6–1	1–0	3–2	2–1	1–0	5–0	3–1	3–0	1–2	3–0	1–0	6–0	3–1	

Legend: Blue = home team win; Yellow = draw; Red = away team win.

=== Division 2 ===
==== Table ====
Pos	Team	Pld	W	D	L	GF	GA	GD	Pts
1	Fulham U23s (C, P)	26	20	2	4	64	27	+37	62
2	Wolverhampton Wanderers U23s (P)	26	14	5	7	46	37	+9	47
3	Stoke City U23s	26	12	7	7	34	36	−2	43
4	Nottingham Forest U23s	26	12	6	8	52	31	+21	42
5	Norwich City U23s	26	12	3	11	64	52	+12	39
6	Burnley U23s	26	11	6	9	46	39	+7	39
7	Southampton U23s	26	12	3	11	45	42	+3	39
8	Newcastle United U23s	26	12	2	12	51	56	−5	38
9	West Bromwich Albion U23s	26	10	5	11	44	54	−10	35
10	Aston Villa U23s	26	9	5	12	53	51	+2	32
11	Birmingham City U23s	26	7	5	14	34	51	−17	26
12	Middlesbrough U23s	26	8	2	16	31	50	−19	26
13	Sunderland U23s	26	7	3	16	35	49	−14	24
14	Reading U23s	26	5	8	13	32	56	−24	23

(C) Champions; (P) Promoted

==== Results ====
Home \ Away	AST	BIR	BUR	FUL	MID	NEW	NOR	NOT	REA	STK	SOU	SUN	WBA	WOL
Aston Villa U23s		3–3	4–1	1–1	1–2	1–2	2–0	5–2	4–1	1–4	2–2	2–3	4–2	0–0
Birmingham City U23s	1–2		1–2	1–3	4–2	0–4	2–1	0–3	0–0	1–1	3–2	1–0	3–2	1–2
Burnley U23s	2–1	1–1		1–2	2–0	5–1	4–3	1–1	3–1	0–1	2–1	2–3	3–2	1–1
Fulham U23s	2–1	3–0	5–3		2–0	3–1	1–2	2–1	3–0	3–0	3–0	2–0	3–0	4–2
Middlesbrough U23s	1–2	0–3	0–3	0–0		4–2	3–2	0–1	2–1	2–0	2–1	3–2	1–2	0–3
Newcastle United U23s	2–0	1–0	2–0	1–6	4–1		2–2	0–1	1–1	2–3	2–4	2–0	4–3	2–3
Norwich City U23s	4–2	2–1	2–1	0–2	4–0	3–4		4–2	5–2	0–1	4–3	1–1	2–5	0–2
Nottingham Forest U23s	4–1	5–0	1–1	1–2	1–1	1–3	3–2		7–0	2–0	0–0	3–0	2–2	1–0
Reading U23s	2–2	1–1	2–1	3–1	2–1	1–4	3–3	0–2		1–1	0–1	0–3	1–1	3–0
Stoke City U23s	0–8	2–1	0–0	0–1	1–0	2–1	0–4	1–0	1–2		3–0	2–2	2–1	2–0
Southampton U23s	4–0	2–3	0–2	2–1	1–0	5–0	0–3	4–2	2–1	1–1		1–0	3–1	2–4
Sunderland U23s	1–3	2–1	0–2	3–4	1–3	1–2	3–4	1–1	2–0	0–3	3–2		0–1	1–2
West Bromwich Albion U23s	2–1	3–2	3–2	2–4	3–2	2–0	3–2	0–5	1–1	1–1	0–1	1–0		0–4
Wolverhampton Wanderers U23s	3–0	2–0	1–1	2–1	2–1	4–2	0–5	1–0	4–3	2–2	0–1	1–3	1–1	

Legend: Blue = home team win; Yellow = draw; Red = away team win.

===== Play-offs =====
Semi-finals
2	Wolverhampton Wanderers U23s	1 (p)
5	Norwich City U23s	1
3	Stoke City U23s	2
4	Nottingham Forest U23s	0

Final
Wolverhampton Wanderers U23s	2
Stoke City U23s	0

==== Semifinals ====
15 May 2022
13:00

Stoke City U23s	2–0	Nottingham Forest U23s
Griffiths 75'; Goodwin 90+4'

Bet365 Stadium, Stoke-on-Trent
Attendance: 1,846
Referee: Steven Copeland

17 May 2022
9:00

Wolverhampton Wanderers U23s	1–1	Norwich City U23s
Bueno 28'		Omotoye 68'
Penalties
Campbell (penalty scored); Bueno (penalty scored); Griffiths (penalty scored); Perry (penalty scored); Tipton (penalty scored)	5–4	(penalty scored) Springett; (penalty scored) Omotoye; (penalty scored) Mumba; (penalty scored) Rowe; (penalty missed) Clarke

Molineux Stadium, Wolverhampton
Attendance: 1,375
Referee: Daniel Middleton

==== Final ====
23 May 2022
13:00

Wolverhampton Wanderers U23s	2–0	Stoke City U23s
Cundle 17', 39'	Report

Molineux Stadium, Wolverhampton
Attendance: 4,936
Referee: Thomas Kirk

== Top goalscorers ==
=== Division 1 ===
As of 23 May 2022

Rank	Player	Club	Goals
1	(England) James McAtee	Manchester City U23s	18
1	(Ghana) Jesurun Rak-Sakyi	Crystal Palace U23s	18
3	(United States) Folarin Balogun	Arsenal U23s	13
3	(Wales) Jack Vale	Blackburn Rovers U23s	13
5	(England) Dilan Markanday	Tottenham Hotspur U23s	12
5	(Republic of Ireland) Armstrong Okoflex	West Ham United U23s	12
5	(England) Sonny Perkins	West Ham United U23s	12
8	(Denmark) Mika Biereth	Arsenal U23s	11
9	(Scotland) Scott Banks	Crystal Palace U23s	10
9	(Zimbabwe) Tawanda Maswanhise	Leicester City U23s	10
11	(England) Alfie Devine	Tottenham Hotspur U23s	9

=== Division 2 ===
As of 23 May 2022

Rank	Player	Club	Goals
1	(England) Abu Kamara	Norwich City U23s	15
2	(Scotland) Thomas Dickson-Peters	Norwich City U23s	13
2	(Wales) Luke Harris	Fulham U23s	13
4	(Belgium) Kazeem Olaigbe	Leeds United U23s	12
4	(Wales) Will Swan	Nottingham Forest U23s	12
6	(England) Dylan Stephenson	Newcastle United U23s	11
7	(England) Will Harris	Sunderland U23s	10
8	(Wales) Chem Campbell	Wolverhampton Wanderers U23s	10
8	(Scotland) Flynn Clarke	Norwich City U23s	10
8	(England) Sonny Hilton	Fulham U23s	10
8	(England) Douglas James-Taylor	Stoke City U23s	10
8	(Sweden) Julian Larsson	Nottingham Forest U23s	10
8	(England) Jonathan Rowe	Norwich City U23s	10

=== Hat-tricks ===
As of 23 May 2022

Player	For	Against	Result	Date	Division	Ref.
(England) Abu Kamara	Norwich City U23s	Southampton U23s	0–3 (A)	15 August 2021	Division 2	
(Republic of Ireland) Armstrong Okoflex	West Ham United U23s	Arsenal U23s	6–1 (H)	16 August 2021	Division 1	
(England) James McAtee	Manchester City U23s	Blackburn Rovers U23s	4–2 (H)	20 August 2021	Division 1	
(England) Dilan Markanday	Tottenham Hotspur U23s	Leeds United U23s	2–4 (A)	23 August 2021	Division 1	
(England) James McAtee	Manchester City U23s	Manchester United U23s	2–4 (A)	28 August 2021	Division 1	
(Austria) Caleb Chukwuemeka	Aston Villa U23s	West Bromwich Albion U23s	4–2 (H)	17 September 2021	Division 2	
(Denmark) Mika Biereth	Arsenal U23s	Chelsea U23s	1–6 (A)	19 September 2021	Division 1	
(England) Will Harris	Sunderland U23s	Wolverhampton Wanderers U23s	1–3 (A)	27 September 2021	Division 2	
(England) Jaden Philogene-Bidace	Aston Villa U23s	Stoke City U23s	0–8 (A)	27 September 2021	Division 2	
(England) Cole Palmer	Manchester City U23s	Leicester City U23s	5–0 (H)	16 October 2021	Division 1	
(England) Will Harris	Sunderland U23s	Aston Villa U23s	2–3 (A)	22 October 2021	Division 2	
(Sweden) Benjamin Mbunga-Kimpioka	Sunderland U23s	Reading U23s	2–3 (A)	1 November 2021	Division 2	
(Republic of Ireland) Jack Stretton	Derby County U23s	Blackburn Rovers U23s	6–0 (H)	5 November 2021	Division 1	
(England) Elliot Anderson	Newcastle United U23s	Nottingham Forest U23s	1–3 (A)	22 November 2021	Division 2	
(United States) Folarin Balogun	Arsenal U23s	Derby County U23s	3–5 (H)	26 November 2021	Division 1	
(Scotland) Thomas Dickson-Peters	Norwich City U23s	Reading U23s	5–2 (H)	3 December 2021	Division 2	
(Republic of Ireland) Armstrong Okoflex	West Ham United U23s	Crystal Palace U23s	2–4 (A)	6 December 2021	Division 1	
(England) Reyes Cleary	West Bromwich Albion U23s	Middlesbrough U23s	3–2 (H)	6 December 2021	Division 2	
(Wales) Jack Vale	Blackburn Rovers U23s	Brighton & Hove Albion U23s	6–0 (H)	4 February 2022	Division 1	
(Wales) Luke Harris	Fulham U23s	Newcastle United U23s	1–6 (A)	21 February 2022	Division 2	
(England) Will Swan	Nottingham Forest U23s	Reading U23s	7–0 (H)	21 February 2022	Division 2	
(Wales) Chem Campbell	Wolverhampton Wanderers U23s	Reading U23s	4–3 (H)	28 February 2022	Division 2	
(England) Ben Woods	Burnley U23s	Newcastle United U23s	5–1 (H)	8 April 2022	Division 2	
(England) Tyler Dibling	Southampton U23s	Newcastle United U23s	2–4 (A)	25 April 2022	Division 2	
(Wales) Luke Harris^{4}	Fulham U23s	Burnley U23s	6–1 (H)	29 April 2022	Division 2	
(Wales) Jack Vale^{4}	Blackburn Rovers U23s	Chelsea U23s	4–3 (H)	1 May 2022	Division 1	
(Ghana) Jesurun Rak-Sakyi	Crystal Palace U23s	Derby County U23s	3–1 (H)	9 May 2022	Division 1	

Note

(H) – Home; (A) – Away
^{4} – player scored 4 goals

=== Awards ===
Player of the season: (England) James McAtee (Manchester City U23s)

=== Player of the Month ===
Month	Player	Club	Ref.
August	(England) James McAtee	Manchester City U23s	
September	(Austria) Caleb Chukwuemeka	Aston Villa U23s	
October	(England) Dilan Markanday	Tottenham Hotspur U23s	
November	(United States) Folarin Balogun	Arsenal U23s	
December	(Scotland) Tom Dickson-Peters	Norwich City U23s	
January	(Republic of Ireland) Calum Kavanagh	Middlesbrough U23s	
February	(Ghana) Jesurun Rak-Sakyi	Crystal Palace U23s	
March	(Portugal) Christian Marques	Wolverhampton Wanderers U23s	
April	(England) Sonny Perkins	West Ham United U23s	

== Professional Development League ==
U23 Professional Development League
- Season: 2021–22
- Champions: Coventry City U23s (1st Title)
- Regular Season Champions: Ipswich Town U23s (1st Title)
- Matches: 203 (200 RS, 3 PO)
- Goals: 682 (3.36 per match) (667 RS, 15 PO)
- Top goalscorer: (Portugal) Fabio Tavares Coventry City U23s (17 Goals)
- Biggest home win: Hull City U23s 6–0 Coventry City U23s (20 November 2021)
- Biggest away win: Barnsley U23s 0–7 Charlton Athletic U23s (24 August 2021)
- Highest scoring: Bristol City U23s 6–2 Hull City U23s (1 September 2021); Coventry City U23s 5–3 Wigan Athletic U23s (18 October 2021)
- Longest winning run: 8 Matches Ipswich Town U23s
- Longest unbeaten run: 11 Matches Ipswich Town U23s
- Longest winless run: 7 Matches Sheffield Wednesday U23s; Queens Park Rangers U23s
- Longest losing run: 5 Matches Queens Park Rangers U23s

The Professional Development League season is the tenth campaign of post-EPPP Under-23 football's second tier, designed for those academies with Category 2 status. A total of 17 teams are split regionally into north and south divisions, with each team facing opponents in their own region twice both home and away and opponents in the other region once resulting in 23 games for the North Division, and 24 games for the South Division. The sides finishing in the top two positions in both regions at the end of the season will progress to a knockout stage to determine the overall league champion. Birmingham City U23s are the defending national champions.

17 Teams competed in the league this season, a record low for the competition with 1 fewer team than last season. Birmingham City U23s, the defending national champions would leave the league after 9 seasons alongside Nottingham Forest U23s to join the Premier League 2 as Category One Academies. Both founding members of the league left after 9 seasons. Peterborough United U23s joined as a Category Two Academy joining the North Division.

=== Tables ===
==== North Division ====
Pos	Team	Pld	W	D	L	GF	GA	GD	Pts	Qualification
1	Sheffield United U23s	23	15	3	5	47	23	+24	48	Qualification for Knock-out stage
2	Coventry City U23s	23	13	4	6	57	39	+18	43	Qualification for Knock-out stage
3	Hull City U23s	23	12	4	7	44	41	+3	40	
4	Wigan Athletic U23s	23	7	4	12	31	39	−8	25	
5	Crewe Alexandra U23s	23	7	2	14	27	50	−23	23	
6	Peterborough United U23s	23	5	7	11	36	41	−5	22	
7	Barnsley U23s	23	5	7	11	22	42	−20	22	
8	Sheffield Wednesday U23s	23	4	8	11	21	32	−11	20	

==== South Division ====
Pos	Team	Pld	W	D	L	GF	GA	GD	Pts	Qualification
1	Ipswich Town U23s	24	16	3	5	58	27	+31	51	Qualification for Knock-out stage
2	Bristol City U23s	24	15	5	4	60	31	+29	50	Qualification for Knock-out stage
3	Cardiff City U23s	24	15	2	7	44	30	+14	47	
4	Charlton Athletic U23s	24	10	6	8	55	46	+9	36	
5	Millwall U23s	24	9	3	12	34	45	−11	30	
6	Colchester United U23s	24	8	5	11	35	44	−9	29	
7	Watford U23s	24	6	7	11	28	43	−15	25	
8	Swansea City U23s	24	5	9	10	34	41	−7	24	
9	Queens Park Rangers U23s	24	7	3	14	34	53	−19	24	

=== Knock-out stage ===
Semi-finals

9 May 2022
19:00

Sheffield United U23s	0–1	Bristol City U23s
	Report	Edwards 89'

LNER Community Stadium, York

10 May 2022
20:00

Coventry City U23s	5–4 (a.e.t.)	Ipswich Town U23s
Bapaga 7'; Rus 55'; Ngandu 99' (pen.), 113' (pen.); Howley 115'	Report	Hughes 15', 91'; Humphreys 29'; Chirewa 105'

CBS Arena, Coventry
Attendance: 350

Final

17 May 2022
19:00

Bristol City U23s	2–3	Coventry City U23s
Edwards 37'; Conway 60'	Report	Rus 4'; Howley 8'; Burroughs 75'

Ashton Gate, Bristol
Attendance: 2,337

=== Top goalscorers ===
As of 17 May 2022

Rank	Player	Club	Goals
1	(Portugal) Fábio Tavares	Coventry City U23s	17
2	(Zimbabwe) Tawanda Chirewa	Ipswich Town U23s	12
2	(Scotland) Tommy Conway	Bristol City U23s	12
4	(England) Chay Cooper	Colchester United U23s	11
5	(England) Sam Bell	Bristol City U23s	9
5	(England) Thomas Hughes	Ipswich Town U23s	9
5	(Sierra Leone) Daniel Kanu	Charlton Athletic U23s	9
5	(Zambia) Chanka Zimba	Cardiff City U23s	9
9	(England) Will Jarvis	Hull City U23s	8
9	(England) McCauley Snelgrove	Hull City U23s	8
9	(Bermuda) Nahki Wells	Bristol City U23s	8
11	(Nigeria) Korede Adedoyin	Sheffield Wednesday U23s	7
11	(England) David Bremang	Barnsley U23s	7
11	(England) Tom Costello	Wigan Athletic U23s	7

=== Hat-tricks ===
As of 17 May 2022

Player	For	Against	Result	Date	Ref.
(Bermuda) Nahki Wells^{4}	Bristol City U23s	Hull City U23s	6–2 (H)	1 September 2021	
(Nigeria) Korede Adedoyin^{4}	Sheffield Wednesday U23s	Peterborough United U23s	5–1 (H)	15 October 2021	
(England) Matty Godden	Coventry City U23s	Wigan Athletic U23s	5–3 (H)	18 October 2021	
(Wales) James Crole	Cardiff City U23s	Charlton Athletic U23s	4–1 (H)	19 October 2021	
(Portugal) Fábio Tavares	Coventry City U23s	Barnsley U23s	1–3 (A)	2 November 2021	
(United States) Charlie Kelman	Queens Park Rangers U23s	Ipswich Town U23s	4–2 (H)	9 November 2021	
(England) Will Jarvis^{4}	Hull City U23s	Coventry City U23s	6–0 (H)	20 November 2021	
(England) Tommy Hughes	Ipswich Town U23s	Queens Park Rangers U23s	4–2 (H)	17 January 2022	
(England) Prince Henry	Bristol City U23s	Millwall U23s	4–0 (H)	22 February 2022	
(Scotland) Kyle Joseph^{4}	Swansea City U23s	Queens Park Rangers U23s	5–1 (H)	14 March 2022	
(Scotland) Tommy Conway	Bristol City U23s	Crewe Alexandra U23s	0–4 (A)	21 March 2022	
(Denmark) William Osula^{4}	Sheffield United U23s	Colchester United U23s	5–1 (H)	22 March 2022	
(England) Miles Leaburn	Charlton Athletic U23s	Queens Park Rangers U23s	0–3 (A)	29 March 2022	
(Sierra Leone) Daniel Kanu	Charlton Athletic U23s	Queens Park Rangers U23s	6–1 (H)	19 April 2022	

Note

(H) – Home; (A) – Away
^{4} – player scored 4 goals

== See also ==
- 2021–22 in English football
