= 2020–21 Ipswich Town F.C. season =

Ipswich Town
2020–21 season
- Owner: Marcus Evans (until 7 April 2021); Gamechanger 20 Ltd. (from 7 April 2021)
- Manager: Paul Lambert (until 28 February 2021); Matt Gill (caretaker) (from 28 February to 2 March 2021); Paul Cook (from 2 March 2021)
- Stadium: Portman Road
- League One: 9th
- FA Cup: First round
- EFL Cup: Second round
- EFL Trophy: Group stage
- Top goalscorer: League: James Norwood (9); All: James Norwood (10)
Home colours	Away colours	Third colours

The 2020–21 season was Ipswich Town's 143rd year in existence. Along with competing in EFL League One, the club also participated in the FA Cup, EFL Cup and EFL Trophy. The season covers the period from 1 July 2020 to 30 June 2021.

== Kits ==
Supplier: Adidas / Sponsor: Carers Trust (chest), Thank You NHS (back), Mortgagemove (shorts)

Home	Away	Third	Third alt.1	Goalkeeper 1	Goalkeeper 2

== First-team squad ==
Age listed below are accurate as of 10 May 2021

Number	Position(s)	Nationality	Name	Age
Goalkeepers
1	GK	(Czech Republic)	Tomáš Holý	10 December 1991 (aged 29)
28	GK	(Wales)	David Cornell	28 March 1991 (aged 30)
Defenders
2	CB	(Republic of Ireland)	Mark McGuinness	5 January 2001 (aged 20)
3	LB	(Republic of Ireland)	Stephen Ward	20 August 1985 (aged 35)
4	CB	(England)	Luke Chambers (C)	28 September 1985 (aged 35)
5	CB	(Wales)	James Wilson	26 February 1989 (aged 32)
6	CB / RB	(England)	Luke Woolfenden	21 October 1998 (aged 22)
22	CB	(Democratic Republic of the Congo)	Aristote Nsiala	25 March 1992 (aged 29)
24	RB / LB	(England)	Kane Vincent-Young	15 March 1996 (aged 25)
30	LB	(England)	Myles Kenlock	26 November 1996 (aged 24)
41	RB	(England)	Luke Matheson	3 October 2002 (aged 18)
Midfielders
7	RW / LW	(Wales)	Gwion Edwards	1 March 1993 (aged 28)
8	DM	(England)	Cole Skuse (VC)	29 March 1986 (aged 35)
11	CM	(England)	Jon Nolan	22 April 1992 (aged 29)
14	RW / LW / AM / SS	(England)	Jack Lankester	19 January 2000 (aged 21)
15	CM	(England)	Teddy Bishop	15 July 1996 (aged 24)
16	CM / LB	(England)	Tristan Nydam	6 November 1999 (aged 21)
18	AM / LW / RW	(Republic of Ireland)	Alan Judge	11 November 1988 (aged 32)
21	CM / DM	(England)	Flynn Downes	20 January 1999 (aged 22)
23	CM	(England)	Andre Dozzell	2 May 1999 (aged 22)
27	RW	(England)	Luke Thomas	19 February 1999 (aged 22)
33	AM / SS	(England)	Josh Harrop	15 December 1995 (aged 25)
36	AM / RW / LW	(Albania)	Armando Dobra	14 April 2001 (aged 20)
44	CM	(Wales)	Emyr Huws	30 September 1993 (aged 27)
Forwards
9	CF	(England)	Kayden Jackson	22 February 1994 (aged 27)
10	CF	(England)	James Norwood	5 September 1990 (aged 30)
17	LW	(England)	Keanan Bennetts	9 March 1999 (aged 22)
20	SS / LW / CF	(England)	Freddie Sears	27 November 1989 (aged 31)
25	CF	(Republic of Ireland)	Aaron Drinan	6 May 1998 (aged 23)
32	CF / CB	(England)	Oliver Hawkins	8 April 1992 (aged 29)
40	CF / SS	(Republic of Ireland)	Troy Parrott	4 February 2002 (aged 19)
Players transferred/loaned out during the season
12	CB / RB / LB	(Saint Lucia)	Janoi Donacien	3 November 1993 (aged 27)
19	CB / LB	(Republic of Ireland)	Corrie Ndaba	25 December 1999 (aged 21)
26	AM / CM	(Tunisia)	Idris El Mizouni	26 September 2000 (aged 20)

== First-team coaching staff ==
Until 28 February:

Position	Name
Manager	(Scotland) Paul Lambert
Assistant Manager	(Scotland) Stuart Taylor
First-team Coach	(England) Matt Gill
Goalkeeping Coach	(England) Jimmy Walker
Head of Athletic Performance & Sports Science	(Scotland) Jim Henry
Strength & Conditioning Coach	(England) Tom Walsh
Head Physiotherapist	(England) Matt Byard
Assistant Head Physiotherapist	(England) Alex Chapman
Head of Performance Analysis	(England) Will Stephenson
First-team Assistant Analyst	(England) George Buckley
Recruitment Analyst	(England) Alex Hood
Opposition Analyst	(Republic of Ireland) Gerard Nash
Kitman	(England) James Pullen

From 2 March:

Position	Name
Manager	(England) Paul Cook
First-team Coach	(England) Matt Gill
First-team Coach	(England) Gary Roberts
Goalkeeping Coach	(England) Jimmy Walker
Head of Athletic Performance & Sports Science	(Scotland) Jim Henry
Strength & Conditioning Coach	(England) Tom Walsh
Head Physiotherapist	(England) Matt Byard
Assistant Head Physiotherapist	(England) Alex Chapman
Head of Performance Analysis	(England) Will Stephenson
First-team Assistant Analyst	(England) George Buckley
Recruitment Analyst	(England) Alex Hood
Opposition Analyst	(Republic of Ireland) Gerard Nash
Kitman	(England) James Pullen

== Pre-season ==
18 August 2020 Friendly	Colchester United	0–4	Ipswich Town	Colchester, England
18:00 BST		Report	Drinan 6', 24' (pen.); Edwards 31'; El Mizouni 52'	Stadium: Colchester Community Stadium; Attendance: 0

18 August 2020 Friendly	Colchester United	0–1	Ipswich Town	Colchester, England
20:00 BST		Report	Judge 23'	Stadium: Colchester Community Stadium; Attendance: 0

22 August 2020 Friendly	Tottenham Hotspur	3–0	Ipswich Town	Tottenham, England
15:00 BST	Sessegnon 6'; Son Heung-min 10', 29'	Report		Stadium: Tottenham Hotspur Stadium; Attendance: 0

25 August 2020 Friendly	Ipswich Town	1–4	West Ham United	Ipswich, England
14:00 BST	Sears 62'	Report	Haller 45', 60', 64'; Souček 63'	Stadium: Portman Road; Attendance: 0

29 August 2020 Friendly	Cambridge United	1–0	Ipswich Town	Cambridge, England
13:00 BST	Digby 56'	Report		Stadium: Abbey Stadium; Attendance: 0

== Competitions ==
=== EFL League One ===
==== League table ====
Pos	Team	Pld	W	D	L	GF	GA	GD	Pts	Promotion, qualification or relegation
5	Lincoln City	46	22	11	13	69	50	+19	77	Qualification for League One play-offs
6	Oxford United	46	22	8	16	77	56	+21	74	Qualification for League One play-offs
7	Charlton Athletic	46	20	14	12	70	56	+14	74	
8	Portsmouth	46	21	9	16	65	51	+14	72	
9	Ipswich Town	46	19	12	15	46	46	0	69	
10	Gillingham	46	19	10	17	63	60	+3	67	
11	Accrington Stanley	46	18	13	15	63	68	−5	67	
12	Crewe Alexandra	46	18	12	16	56	61	−5	66	
13	Milton Keynes Dons	46	18	11	17	64	62	+2	65	

Source: EFL Official Website
Rules for classification: 1) Points; 2) Goal difference; 3) Number of goals scored; 4) Head-to-head results; 5) Wins; 6) Away goals; 7) Penalty points (sec 9.5); 8) 12-point sending off offences

==== Results summary ====
Overall								Home						Away					
Pld	W	D	L	GF	GA	GD	Pts	W	D	L	GF	GA	GD	W	D	L	GF	GA	GD
46	19	12	15	46	46	0	69	12	5	6	25	18	+7	7	7	9	21	28	−7

Last updated: 9 May 2021.
Source: BBC

==== Results by round ====
Round	1	2	3	4	5	6	7	8	9	10	11	12	13	14	15	16	17	18	19	20	21	22	23	24	25	26	27	28	29	30	31	32	33	34	35	36	37	38	39	40	41	42	43	44	45	46
Ground	H	A	H	A	A	H	A	A	H	H	A	H	H	H	A	A	H	H	H	A	H	H	A	H	A	H	H	A	H	A	A	H	H	A	A	A	H	A	H	A	A	A	H	A	A	H
Result	W	W	W	D	W	W	L	L	W	W	L	W	L	L	D	W	L	W	L	W	L	L	D	W	L	D	D	W	W	W	L	D	W	L	L	D	W	D	D	L	D	L	D	W	D	W
Position	5	1	1	3	1	1	2	4	3	2	2	3	5	6	5	3	6	5	8	7	9	10	11	10	11	11	12	10	8	7	8	7	6	7	9	11	9	8	8	9	9	11	11	10	9	9

Updated to match(es) played on 9 May 2021. Source:
A = Away; H = Home; W = Win; D = Draw; L = Loss

==== Matches ====
The 2020–21 season fixtures were released on 21 August.

13 September 2020 1	Ipswich Town	2–0	Wigan Athletic	Ipswich
12:00 BST	Bishop 11'; Chambers (yellow card) 61'; Edwards 80'	Report	Perry (yellow card) 90+3'	Stadium: Portman Road; Attendance: 0 Referee: Thomas Bramall

19 September 2020 2	Bristol Rovers	0–2	Ipswich Town	Horfield
15:00 BST	Upson (yellow card) 42'; Grant (yellow card) 90+1'	Report	Norwood (yellow card) 53'; Edwards (yellow card) 66'; Ehmer 80' (o.g.); Nolan 89'	Stadium: Memorial Stadium; Attendance: 0 Referee: Craig Hicks

26 September 2020 3	Ipswich Town	2–0	Rochdale	Ipswich
15:00 BST	Bishop 53'; Edwards 59'; Nolan (yellow card) 65'	Report	Ryan (yellow card) 8'; O'Connell (yellow card) 50'	Stadium: Portman Road; Referee: John Busby

3 October 2020 4	Milton Keynes Dons	1–1	Ipswich Town	Milton Keynes
15:00 BST	Harvie (yellow card) 36' (goal) 54'; Kasumu (yellow card) 77'	Report	Nolan 7'; Downes (yellow card) 65'	Stadium: Stadium MK; Attendance: 0 Referee: David Rock

10 October 2020 5	Blackpool	1–4	Ipswich Town	Blackpool
15:00 BST	Robson (yellow card) 37'; Lawrence-Gabriel (yellow card) 45+2'; Madine 60'	Report	Chambers 16'; Edwards 36', 80'; Bishop 45'; Kenlock (yellow card) 50'; Dozzell (yellow card) 67'	Stadium: Bloomfield Road; Attendance: 0 Referee: Chris Sarginson

10 October 2020	Ipswich Town	v	Charlton Athletic	Ipswich
15:00 BST				Stadium: Portman Road

17 October 2020 6	Ipswich Town	2–0	Accrington Stanley	Ipswich
15:00 BST	Edwards 55'; Sears 71'; Chambers (yellow card) 81'	Report	Burgess (yellow card) 80'	Stadium: Portman Road; Attendance: 0 Referee: Robert Lewis

20 October 2020 7	Doncaster Rovers	4–1	Ipswich Town	Doncaster
19:00 BST	John 28'; Whiteman 37' 62' (pen.); Okenabirhie 64'	Report	Wright 15' (o.g.); Dozzell (yellow card) 46'; Nsiala (yellow card) 61'; Wilson (yellow card) 82'	Stadium: Keepmoat Stadium; Referee: Scott Oldham

24 October 2020 8	Lincoln City	1–0	Ipswich Town	Lincoln
15:00 BST	Grant 77' (pen.); McGrandles (yellow card) 90+2'; Edun (yellow card) 90+6'	Report	Nolan (red card) 90+5'; Bishop (yellow card) 90+6'	Stadium: Sincil Bank; Attendance: 0 Referee: Kevin Johnson

27 October 2020 9	Ipswich Town	1–0	Gillingham	Ipswich
19:00 BST	Dozzell (yellow card) 57'; Bishop 86' (yellow card) 88'	Report	MacDonald (yellow card) 27'	Stadium: Portman Road; Attendance: 0 Referee: Antony Coggins

31 October 2020 10	Ipswich Town	1–0	Crewe Alexandra	Ipswich
15:00 BST	Dozzell (yellow card) 55'; Hawkins 62'; Judge (yellow card) 66'; Jackson (yellow card) 86'; Edwards (yellow card) 88'	Report	Mandron (yellow card) 63'	Stadium: Portman Road; Attendance: 0 Referee: Trevor Kettle

3 November 2020 11	Sunderland	2–1	Ipswich Town	Monkwearmouth
19:30 BST	Wyke 8'; Leadbitter (yellow card) 78' (goal) 84' (pen.); Hume (yellow card) 82'	Report	Lankester 38'; Dozzell (red card) 72'; Hawkins (yellow card) 84'	Stadium: Stadium of Light; Attendance: 0 Referee: Peter Wright

21 November 2020 12	Ipswich Town	2–1	Shrewsbury Town	Ipswich
15:00 BST	Lankester (yellow card) 62' (goal) 90+7'; Ebanks-Landell 75' (o.g.)	Report	Norburn 4' (pen.) (yellow card) 33'; Ebanks-Landell (yellow card) 90+3'	Stadium: Portman Road; Attendance: 0 Referee: Tim Robinson

24 November 2020 13	Ipswich Town	0–3	Hull City	Ipswich
19:00 BST	Jackson (yellow card) 79'	Report	Wilks 2'; Magennis 45+1'; Eaves 77'	Stadium: Portman Road; Attendance: 0 Referee: Lee Swabey

28 November 2020 14	Ipswich Town	0–2	Charlton Athletic	Ipswich
15:00 BST	Judge (yellow card) 43'; Ward (yellow card) 90+7'	Report	Morgan 21'; Bogle 68'; Maatsen (yellow card) 90+7'	Stadium: Portman Road; Attendance: 0 Referee: Craig Hicks

1 December 2020 15	Oxford United	0–0	Ipswich Town	Oxford
19:00 BST		Report	Dozzell (yellow card) 85'	Stadium: Kassam Stadium; Attendance: 0 Referee: Bobby Madley

5 December 2020 16	Plymouth Argyle	1–2	Ipswich Town	Plymouth
15:00 GMT	Jephcott 14'; Mayor (yellow card) 52' (yellow-red card) 70'; Nouble (yellow card) 71'; Watts (yellow card) 79'	Report	McGavin (yellow card) 50'; Nolan 73'; Jackson 74'; Cornell (yellow card) 90+2'	Stadium: Home Park; Attendance: 1,808; Referee: Ollie Yates

12 December 2020 17	Ipswich Town	0–2	Portsmouth	Ipswich
15:00 BST	Lankester (yellow card) 70'; McGuinness (yellow card) 72'; McGavin (yellow card) 74'	Report	Williams 29' 44'; Curtis (yellow card) 70'; Raggett (yellow card) 79'; Whatmough (yellow card) 88'	Stadium: Portman Road; Attendance: 2,000; Referee: Thomas Bramall

15 December 2020 18	Ipswich Town	2–1	Burton Albion	Ipswich
19:45 BST	Bennetts 4'; McGuinness (yellow card) 51'; Jackson (yellow card) 53'; Huws 80'; Dobra (yellow card) 90+3'	Report	Powell 21'; Daniel (yellow card) 51'; Bostwick (yellow card) 53'; Brayford (yellow card) 90+3'; Edwards (yellow card) 90+3'	Stadium: Portman Road; Attendance: 2,000; Referee: Darren Bond

19 December 2020	Peterborough United	v	Ipswich Town	Peterborough
15:00 BST				Stadium: London Road Stadium

26 December 2020	Ipswich Town	v	Northampton Town	Ipswich
15:00 BST				Stadium: Portman Road

29 December 2020	AFC Wimbledon	v	Ipswich Town	Wimbledon
19:45 BST				Stadium: Plough Lane

2 January 2021	Fleetwood Town	v	Ipswich Town	Fleetwood
15:00 BST				Stadium: Highbury Stadium

9 January 2021 19	Ipswich Town	2–3	Swindon Town	Ipswich
17:30 GMT	Downes (yellow card) 53'; Norwood 62', (yellow card) 71'; Judge 87'	Report	Caddis (yellow card) 10'; Jaiyesimi 16', 74'; Twine 67'	Stadium: Portman Road; Attendance: 0 Referee: Seb Stockbridge

16 January 2021 20	Burton Albion	0–1	Ipswich Town	Burton upon Trent
15:00 GMT	Brayford (yellow card) 62'; Gallacher (yellow card) 75'	Report	Chambers (yellow card) 29'; Norwood (yellow card) 54'; McGuinness 73'; Dozzell (yellow card) 83'; Drinan (yellow card) 85'	Stadium: Pirelli Stadium; Attendance: 0 Referee: Neil Hair

23 January 2021 21	Ipswich Town	0–1	Peterborough United	Ipswich
15:00 GMT	Ward (yellow card) 60'; Edwards (yellow card) 71'	Report	Clarke-Harris (penalty missed); Taylor (yellow card) 45+1'; McGuinness 69' (o.g.)	Stadium: Portman Road; Attendance: 0 Referee: Antony Coggins

26 January 2021 22	Ipswich Town	0–1	Sunderland	Ipswich
19:45 BST	Jackson (red card) 10'; Ward (yellow card) 70'; Dozzell (yellow card) 82'	Report	Winchester (yellow card) 40'; Wyke 45+1'	Stadium: Portman Road; Attendance: 0 Referee: Charles Breakspear

30 January 2021 23	Crewe Alexandra	1–1	Ipswich Town	Crewe
15:00 BST	Beckles (yellow card) 39'; Kirk 59' (yellow card) 73'	Report	Kenlock (yellow card) 33'; Sears (yellow card) 36'; Bishop (yellow card) 70' (yellow-red card) 82'; Drinan 75'	Stadium: Gresty Road; Attendance: 0 Referee: Ross Joyce

6 February 2021 24	Ipswich Town	2–0	Blackpool	Ipswich
15:00 BST	Kenlock (yellow card) 22'; Judge 43'; Woolfenden 49'; Matheson (yellow card) 67'	Report	Maxwell (yellow card) 57'; Kaikai (yellow card) 64'	Stadium: Portman Road; Attendance: 0 Referee: John Busby

9 February 2021 25	Peterborough United	2–1	Ipswich Town	Peterborough
19:00 GMT	Clarke-Harris 38'; Ward 50'	Report	Norwood 6'; Downes (yellow card) 14'; Dozzell (yellow card) 76'	Stadium: Weston Homes Stadium; Attendance: 0 Referee: Ben Toner

13 February 2021	Shrewsbury Town	v	Ipswich Town	Shrewsbury
15:00 BST				Stadium: New Meadow

16 February 2021 26	Ipswich Town	0–0	Northampton Town	Ipswich
19:00 BST	Woolfenden (yellow card) 45'; Judge (yellow card) 90'; Downes (red card) 90+3'	Report	Morris (yellow card) 28'; McWilliams (yellow card) 48'; Mills (yellow card) 66'	Stadium: Portman Road; Attendance: 0 Referee: Darren Drysdale

20 February 2021 27	Ipswich Town	0–0	Oxford United	Ipswich
15:00 BST	Kenlock (yellow card) 76'	Report	Rodríguez (yellow card) 28'; Forde (yellow card) 48'; Winnall (yellow card) 90+4'	Stadium: Portman Road; Attendance: 0 Referee: Marc Edwards

23 February 2021 28	Hull City	0–1	Ipswich Town	Kingston upon Hull
19:45 BST	Wilks (yellow card) 56'; Elder (yellow card) 89'	Report	Norwood 15'; Nsiala (yellow card) 41'; Bennetts (yellow card) 58'; Kenlock (yellow card) 77'	Stadium: KCOM Stadium; Attendance: 0 Referee: Tom Nield

27 February 2021 29	Ipswich Town	2–1	Doncaster Rovers	Ipswich
15:00 GMT	Judge 24'; Kenlock (yellow card) 47'; Norwood 54'	Report	Taylor 73'	Stadium: Portman Road; Referee: Martin Coy

2 March 2021 30	Accrington Stanley	1–2	Ipswich Town	Accrington
19:45 BST	Charles 4' (yellow card) 48'; Conneely (red card) 16'; Burgess (yellow card) 45+6'; McConville (yellow card) 67'	Report	Wilson 41' (yellow card) 79'; Norwood (penalty missed) 16' 45+6'	Stadium: Crown Ground; Attendance: 0 Referee: Bobby Madley

6 March 2021 31	Gillingham	3–1	Ipswich Town	Gillingham
13:00 GMT	Tucker 7'; Oliver 73', 80'	Report	Chambers 65'; Norwood (yellow card) 82'	Stadium: Priestfield Stadium; Attendance: 0 Referee: Graham Salisbury

9 March 2021 32	Ipswich Town	1–1	Lincoln City	Ipswich
19:45 BST	Bishop (yellow card) 50'; Wilson 72'; Downes (yellow card) 84'	Report	Rogers 29'; Edun (yellow card) 43'; Montsma (yellow card) 63'	Stadium: Portman Road; Attendance: 0 Referee: James Oldham

13 March 2021 33	Ipswich Town	1–0	Plymouth Argyle	Ipswich
15:00 BST	Parrott 4'	Report		Stadium: Portman Road; Attendance: 0 Referee: Sam Purkiss

16 March 2021 34	Fleetwood Town	2–0	Ipswich Town	Fleetwood
19:45 GMT	Connolly 9'; Garner 57'; Batty (yellow card) 80'; Cairns (yellow card) 90'	Report	Edwards (yellow card) 45+4'	Stadium: Highbury Stadium; Attendance: 0 Referee: Gavin Ward

20 March 2021 35	Portsmouth	2–1	Ipswich Town	Milton
13:00 GMT	Whatmough (yellow card) 18'; Naylor 41'; Curtis (yellow card) 52'; Cannon (yellow card) 56'; Harness 72'; Jacobs (yellow card) 82'	Report	Norwood 32'; Edwards (yellow card) 66'; Chambers (yellow card) 66'; Bishop (yellow card) 71'	Stadium: Fratton Park; Attendance: 0 Referee: Alan Young

27 March 2021 36	Wigan Athletic	0–0	Ipswich Town	Wigan
15:00 GMT	Aasgaard (yellow card) 14'; Darikwa (yellow card) 64'; Lang (yellow card) 69'	Report	Woolfenden (yellow card) 68'; Chambers (yellow card) 87'	Stadium: DW Stadium; Attendance: 0 Referee: James Bell

2 April 2021 37	Ipswich Town	2–1	Bristol Rovers	Ipswich
15:00 BST	Leahy 1' (o.g.); Jugde 11'; Holý (yellow card) 24'; Drinan (yellow card) 65'	Report	McCormick 18'; Oztumer (yellow card) 77'	Stadium: Portman Road; Attendance: 0 Referee: Stephen Martin

5 April 2021 38	Rochdale	0–0	Ipswich Town	Rochdale
15:00 BST		Report	Harrop (yellow card) 89'	Stadium: Spotland; Attendance: 0 Referee: Robert Lewis

10 April 2021 39	Ipswich Town	0–0	Milton Keynes Dons	Ipswich
15:00 BST	Dobra (yellow card) 2'; Downes (yellow card) 80'	Report		Stadium: Portman Road; Attendance: 0 Referee: Tom Nield

13 April 2021 40	AFC Wimbledon	3–0	Ipswich Town	Wimbledon
18:30 BST	Nightingale 21'; Rudoni 25', (yellow card) 45+1'; Longman 86'	Report	Harrop (red card) 28'; Judge (yellow card) 58'	Stadium: Plough Lane; Attendance: 0 Referee: Antony Coggins

17 April 2021 41	Charlton Athletic	0–0	Ipswich Town	Charlton
12:30 BST	Jaiyesimi (yellow card) 45+1'; Watson (yellow card) 68'	Report	Dozzell (yellow card) 43'	Stadium: The Valley; Attendance: 0 Referee: Craig Hicks

20 April 2021 42	Northampton Town	3–0	Ipswich Town	Northampton
19:00 BST	Kioso 8', 32'; Watson 84'; Rose (yellow card) 90'	Report		Stadium: PTS Academy Stadium; Attendance: 0 Referee: James Bell

24 April 2021 43	Ipswich Town	0–0	AFC Wimbledon	Ipswich
15:00 BST	Edwards (yellow card) 44'	Report	Pigott (penalty missed) 22'	Stadium: Portman Road; Attendance: 0 Referee: Ollie Yates

1 May 2021 44	Swindon Town	1–2	Ipswich Town	Swindon
15:00 BST	Thompson (yellow card) 34'; Grounds (yellow card) 43'; Pitman 71'; Curran (yellow card) 73'	Report	Norwood 44' (pen.) 58' (penalty missed) 73'; Downes (yellow card) 81'	Stadium: County Ground; Attendance: 0 Referee: Kevin Johnson

4 May 2021 45	Shrewsbury Town	0–0	Ipswich Town	Shrewsbury
19:00 BST	Pennington (yellow card) 27'; Pennington (yellow card) 55'	Report	Norwood (yellow card) 44'; Woolfenden (yellow card) 61'	Stadium: New Meadow; Attendance: 0 Referee: Lee Swabey

9 May 2021 46	Ipswich Town	3–1	Fleetwood Town	Ipswich
12:00 BST	Norwood 3'; Edwards 9'; Parrott 29'	Report	Finley (yellow card) 51'; Burns 72'; Rossiter (yellow card) 80'	Stadium: Portman Road; Attendance: 0 Referee: John Busby

=== FA Cup ===
The draw for the first round of the FA Cup took place on 26 October.

7 November 2020 First round	Ipswich Town	2–3	Portsmouth	Ipswich
15:00 BST	Hawkins (yellow card) 27'; Nolan 43'; Norwood 66' (yellow card) 112'; Donacien (yellow card) 110'	Report	Curtis 11'; Naylor 13'; Pring (yellow card) 27'; Raggett 111'	Stadium: Portman Road; Attendance: 0 Referee: Andy Haines

=== EFL Cup ===
The first round draw was made on 18 August, live on Sky Sports, by Paul Merson. The draw for both the second and third round were confirmed on September 6, live on Sky Sports by Phil Babb.

5 September 2020 First round	Ipswich Town	3–0	Bristol Rovers	Ipswich
15:00 BST	Dozzell (yellow card) 24'; Sears 29', 68'; Chambers 44'; Woolfenden (yellow card) 73'	Report	Grant (yellow card) 86'	Stadium: Portman Road; Attendance: 0 Referee: Will Finnie

16 September 2020 Second round	Ipswich Town	0–1	Fulham	Ipswich
19:00 BST		Report	Mitrović 38'	Stadium: Portman Road; Attendance: 0 Referee: Dean Whitestone

=== EFL Trophy ===
The regional group stage draw was confirmed on 18 August.

==== Group stage ====
Pos	Div	Team	Pld	W	PW	PL	L	GF	GA	GD	Pts	Qualification
1	ACA	Arsenal U21	3	2	1	0	0	5	3	+2	8	Advance to Round 2
2	L1	Gillingham	3	1	0	1	1	3	4	−1	4	Advance to Round 2
3	L2	Crawley Town	3	1	0	0	2	4	4	0	3	
4	L1	Ipswich Town	3	1	0	0	2	3	4	−1	3	

Source: EFL.com

8 September 2020 Group B	Ipswich Town	1–2	Arsenal U21	Ipswich
19:45 BST	Nolan 26' (yellow card) 90+2'	Report	Lewis 45+1'; Balogun 54'; Akinola (yellow card) 79'	Stadium: Portman Road; Attendance: 0

6 October 2020 Group B	Ipswich Town	2–0	Gillingham	Ipswich
19:00 BST	Dobra 57'; Folami (yellow card) 68' (goal) 75'; Gibbs (yellow card) 83'	Report	Maghoma (yellow card) 53'; Akinde (yellow card) 56'; Eccles (yellow card) 89'	Stadium: Portman Road; Attendance: 0

10 November 2020 Group B	Crawley Town	2–0	Ipswich Town	Crawley
19:00 BST	Galach 17', 55'; Khaleel (yellow card) 84'	Report	Bennetts (yellow card) 84'	Stadium: Broadfield Stadium; Attendance: 0

== Transfers ==
=== Transfers in ===
Date	Position	Nationality	Name	From	Fee	Ref.
1 July 2020	LW	(England)	Ross Crane	(England) Bury Town	Free transfer	
17 August 2020	GK	(Wales)	David Cornell	(England) Northampton Town	Free transfer	
17 August 2020	CF	(England)	Oliver Hawkins	(England) Portsmouth	Free transfer	
17 August 2020	LB	(Republic of Ireland)	Stephen Ward	(England) Stoke City	Free transfer	
9 September 2020	GK	(England)	Albert White	(England) AFC Wimbledon	Free transfer	

=== Loans in ===
Date from	Position	Nationality	Name	From	Date until	Ref.
22 September 2020	CB	(Republic of Ireland)	Mark McGuinness	(England) Arsenal	End of season	
2 October 2020	LW	(England)	Keanan Bennetts	(Germany) Borussia Mönchengladbach	End of season	
19 January 2021	RW	(England)	Luke Thomas	(England) Barnsley	End of season	
20 January 2021	AM	(England)	Josh Harrop	(England) Preston North End	End of season	
1 February 2021	CF	(Republic of Ireland)	Troy Parrott	(England) Tottenham Hotspur	End of season	
1 February 2021	RB	(England)	Luke Matheson	(England) Wolverhampton Wanderers	End of season	

=== Transfers out ===
Date	Position	Nationality	Name	To	Fee	Ref.
1 July 2020	CF	(England)	Will Keane	(England) Wigan Athletic	Released	
1 July 2020	LM	(England)	Jordan Roberts	(Scotland) Heart of Midlothian	Free transfer	
1 July 2020	LW	(England)	Danny Rowe	(England) Burton Albion	Released	
1 July 2020	CB	(England)	Alex Henderson	(United States) Georgia State Panthers	Free transfer	
22 March 2021	RB	(Republic of Ireland)	Barry Cotter	Free agent	Mutual consent	

=== Loans out ===
Date from	Position	Nationality	Name	To	Date until	Ref.
27 August 2020	GK	(England)	Harry Wright	(Sweden) GAIS	31 December 2020	
4 September 2020	LB	(England)	Bailey Clements	(England) Dagenham & Redbridge	1 January 2021	
4 September 2020	CF	(England)	Kai Brown	(England) Dagenham & Redbridge	1 January 2021	
22 September 2020	AM	(Tunisia)	Idris El Mizouni	(England) Cambridge United	3 January 2021	
30 September 2020	FW	(England)	Colin Oppong	(England) Lowestoft Town		
4 October 2020	GK	(Wales)	Adam Przybek	(England) Braintree Town	31 October 2020	
9 October 2020	CB	(Netherlands)	Levi Andoh	(England) Lowestoft Town	9 November 2020	
16 October 2020	RB	(Republic of Ireland)	Barry Cotter	(England) Chelmsford City	2 January 2021	
28 October 2020	CF	(Australia)	Ben Folami	(Australia) Melbourne Victory	End of season	
4 December 2020	GK	(Wales)	Adam Przybek	(England) Concord Rangers	3 January 2021	
7 January 2021	CB	(Republic of Ireland)	Corrie Ndaba	(Scotland) Ayr United	End of season	
21 January 2021	GK	(Wales)	Adam Przybek	(England) Chesterfield	End of season	
22 January 2021	RB	(Saint Lucia)	Janoi Donacien	(England) Fleetwood Town	End of season	
29 January 2021	AM	(Tunisia)	Idris El Mizouni	(England) Grimsby Town	End of season	
1 February 2021	DM	(England)	Brett McGavin	(Scotland) Ayr United	End of season	
22 March 2021	CB	(Indonesia)	Elkan Baggott	(England) King's Lynn Town	End of season	

=== New contracts ===
Date signed	Number	Position	Nationality	Name	Contract length	Expiry	Ref.
1 July 2020	40	AM	(England)	Tommy Hughes	1 year	2021	
1 July 2020	28	CB	(England)	Luke Woolfenden	4 years	2024	
9 September 2020	42	DM	(England)	Brett McGavin	2 years	2022	
2 November 2020	51	CM	(Zimbabwe)	Tawanda Chirewa	2 years	2022	
4 December 2020	23	CM	(England)	Andre Dozzell	3 years	2024	
28 January 2021	46	CB	(Indonesia)	Elkan Baggott	2 years	2023	

== Squad statistics ==
All statistics updated as of end of season

=== Appearances and goals ===
No.	Pos	Nat	Player	Total		League One		FA Cup		EFL Cup		EFL Trophy	
No.	Pos	Nat	Player	Apps	Goals	Apps	Goals	Apps	Goals	Apps	Goals	Apps	Goals
Goalkeepers
1	GK	(Czech Republic) CZE	Tomáš Holý	37	0	36	0	0	0	1	0	0	0
28	GK	(Wales) WAL	David Cornell	15	0	10	0	1	0	1	0	3	0
Defenders
2	DF	(Republic of Ireland) IRL	Mark McGuinness	25	1	23+1	1	1	0	0	0	0	0
3	DF	(Republic of Ireland) IRL	Stephen Ward	31	0	29+1	0	0	0	1	0	0	0
4	DF	(England) ENG	Luke Chambers	41	3	39	2	0	0	1	1	1	0
5	DF	(Wales) WAL	James Wilson	18	2	17	2	0	0	1	0	0	0
6	DF	(England) ENG	Luke Woolfenden	28	1	24+1	1	0	0	1	0	2	0
22	DF	(Democratic Republic of the Congo) COD	Aristote Nsiala	30	0	27	0	1	0	2	0	0	0
24	DF	(England) ENG	Kane Vincent-Young	7	0	6+1	0	0	0	0	0	0	0
30	DF	(England) ENG	Myles Kenlock	24	0	17+4	0	1	0	1	0	1	0
41	DF	(England) ENG	Luke Matheson	2	0	2	0	0	0	0	0	0	0
49	DF	(England) ENG	Dylan Crowe	1	0	0	0	0	0	0	0	1	0
50	DF	(England) ENG	Tommy Smith	1	0	0	0	0	0	0	0	1	0
57	DF	(Netherlands) NED	Levi Andoh	1	0	0	0	0	0	0	0	1	0
Midfielders
7	MF	(Wales) WAL	Gwion Edwards	40	6	29+7	6	0+1	0	1+1	0	0+1	0
8	MF	(England) ENG	Cole Skuse	4	0	1+3	0	0	0	0	0	0	0
11	MF	(England) ENG	Jon Nolan	17	5	11+2	3	1	1	2	0	1	1
14	MF	(England) ENG	Jack Lankester	19	2	7+10	2	0+1	0	0	0	1	0
15	MF	(England) ENG	Teddy Bishop	38	4	28+8	4	0	0	1	0	1	0
16	MF	(England) ENG	Tristan Nydam	1	0	0+1	0	0	0	0	0	0	0
18	MF	(Republic of Ireland) IRL	Alan Judge	38	4	29+5	4	0+1	0	1+1	0	1	0
21	MF	(England) ENG	Flynn Downes	25	0	17+7	0	0	0	0+1	0	0	0
23	MF	(England) ENG	Andre Dozzell	46	0	42+1	0	0	0	2	0	1	0
27	MF	(England) ENG	Luke Thomas	5	0	4+1	0	0	0	0	0	0	0
33	MF	(England) ENG	Josh Harrop	15	0	3+12	0	0	0	0	0	0	0
36	MF	(Albania) ALB	Armando Dobra	19	1	8+9	0	0	0	1	0	1	1
44	MF	(Wales) WAL	Emyr Huws	12	1	6+3	1	1	0	1	0	0+1	0
48	MF	(England) ENG	Liam Gibbs	3	0	1	0	0	0	0	0	2	0
52	MF	(England) ENG	Ross Crane	2	0	0	0	0	0	0	0	1+1	0
55	MF	(England) ENG	Zanda Siziba	2	0	0	0	0	0	0	0	1+1	0
56	MF	(France) FRA	Allan Viral	2	0	0	0	0	0	0	0	1+1	0
Forwards
9	FW	(England) ENG	Kayden Jackson	25	1	12+13	1	0	0	0	0	0	0
10	FW	(England) ENG	James Norwood	29	10	19+7	9	1	1	0+1	0	0+1	0
17	FW	(England) ENG	Keanan Bennetts	30	1	13+15	1	1	0	0	0	1	0
20	FW	(England) ENG	Freddie Sears	29	3	15+11	1	1	0	1	2	1	0
25	FW	(Republic of Ireland) IRL	Aaron Drinan	24	1	6+16	1	0	0	1	0	1	0
32	FW	(England) ENG	Oliver Hawkins	23	1	8+12	1	1	0	1+1	0	0	0
40	FW	(Republic of Ireland) IRL	Troy Parrott	18	2	13+5	2	0	0	0	0	0	0
47	FW	(England) ENG	Tyreece Simpson	2	0	0+1	0	0	0	0	0	1	0
53	FW	(England) ENG	Zak Brown	1	0	0	0	0	0	0	0	1	0
59	FW	(England) ENG	Jack Manly	1	0	0	0	0	0	0	0	1	0
Players transferred out during the season
12	DF	(Saint Lucia) LCA	Janoi Donacien	3	0	0	0	1	0	1	0	1	0
19	DF	(Republic of Ireland) IRL	Corrie Ndaba	4	0	0	0	0	0	0+1	0	3	0
42	MF	(England) ENG	Brett McGavin	7	0	4+1	0	1	0	0	0	1	0
45	FW	(Australia) AUS	Ben Folami	1	1	0	0	0	0	0	0	1	1
46	DF	(Indonesia) IDN	Elkan Baggott	1	0	0	0	0	0	0	0	1	0

Last updated: end of season
Source: Competitions

=== Goalscorers ===
No.	Pos	Nat	Player	League One	FA Cup	EFL Cup	EFL Trophy	Total
10	FW	(England)	James Norwood	9	1	0	0	10
7	MF	(Wales)	Gwion Edwards	6	0	0	0	6
11	MF	(England)	Jon Nolan	3	1	0	1	5
15	MF	(England)	Teddy Bishop	4	0	0	0	4
18	MF	(Republic of Ireland)	Alan Judge	4	0	0	0	4
4	DF	(England)	Luke Chambers	2	0	1	0	3
20	FW	(England)	Freddie Sears	1	0	2	0	3
5	DF	(Wales)	James Wilson	2	0	0	0	2
14	MF	(England)	Jack Lankester	2	0	0	0	2
40	FW	(Republic of Ireland)	Troy Parrott	2	0	0	0	2
2	DF	(Republic of Ireland)	Mark McGuinness	1	0	0	0	1
6	DF	(England)	Luke Woolfenden	1	0	0	0	1
9	FW	(England)	Kayden Jackson	1	0	0	0	1
17	FW	(England)	Keanan Bennetts	1	0	0	0	1
25	FW	(Republic of Ireland)	Aaron Drinan	1	0	0	0	1
32	FW	(England)	Oliver Hawkins	1	0	0	0	1
36	MF	(Albania)	Armando Dobra	0	0	0	1	1
44	MF	(Wales)	Emyr Huws	1	0	0	0	1
45	FW	(Australia)	Ben Folami	0	0	0	1	1
Own goal				4	0	0	0	4
Total				43	2	3	3	51

=== Assists ===
No.	Pos	Nat	Player	League One	FA Cup	EFL Cup	EFL Trophy	Total
7	MF	(Wales)	Gwion Edwards	4	0	0	0	4
18	MF	(Republic of Ireland)	Alan Judge	2	0	1	1	4
10	FW	(England)	James Norwood	3	0	0	0	3
15	MF	(England)	Teddy Bishop	2	0	1	0	3
30	DF	(England)	Myles Kenlock	3	0	0	0	3
3	DF	(Republic of Ireland)	Stephen Ward	2	0	0	0	2
4	DF	(England)	Luke Chambers	2	0	0	0	2
32	FW	(England)	Oliver Hawkins	2	0	0	0	2
9	FW	(England)	Kayden Jackson	1	0	0	0	1
14	MF	(England)	Jack Lankester	1	0	0	0	1
20	FW	(England)	Freddie Sears	0	1	0	0	1
23	MF	(England)	Andre Dozzell	1	0	0	0	1
25	FW	(Republic of Ireland)	Aaron Drinan	0	0	1	0	1
33	MF	(England)	Josh Harrop	1	0	0	0	1
36	MF	(Albania)	Armando Dobra	1	0	0	0	1
48	MF	(England)	Liam Gibbs	0	0	0	1	1
Total				22	1	3	2	28

=== Clean sheets ===
No.	Nat	Player	League One	FA Cup	EFL Cup	EFL Trophy	Total
1	(Czech Republic)	Tomáš Holý	16	0	1	0	17
28	(Wales)	David Cornell	3	0	0	1	4
Total			19	0	1	1	21

=== Disciplinary record ===
No.	Pos	Nat	Player	League One		FA Cup		EFL Cup		EFL Trophy		Total	
No.	Pos	Nat	Player	Booked	Sent off (straight red)	Booked	Sent off (straight red)	Booked	Sent off (straight red)	Booked	Sent off (straight red)	Booked	Sent off (straight red)
1	GK	(Czech Republic)	Tomáš Holý	1	0	0	0	0	0	0	0	1	0
2	DF	(Republic of Ireland)	Mark McGuinness	2	0	0	0	0	0	0	0	2	0
3	DF	(Republic of Ireland)	Stephen Ward	3	0	0	0	0	0	0	0	3	0
4	DF	(England)	Luke Chambers	5	0	0	0	0	0	0	0	5	0
5	DF	(Wales)	James Wilson	2	0	0	0	0	0	0	0	2	0
6	DF	(England)	Luke Woolfenden	3	0	0	0	1	0	0	0	4	0
7	MF	(Wales)	Gwion Edwards	6	0	0	0	0	0	0	0	6	0
9	FW	(England)	Kayden Jackson	3	1	0	0	0	0	0	0	3	1
10	FW	(England)	James Norwood	5	0	1	0	0	0	0	0	6	0
11	MF	(England)	Jon Nolan	1	1	0	0	0	0	1	0	2	1
12	DF	(Saint Lucia)	Janoi Donacien	0	0	1	0	0	0	0	0	1	0
14	MF	(England)	Jack Lankester	2	0	0	0	0	0	0	0	2	0
15	MF	(England)	Teddy Bishop	5	1	0	0	0	0	0	0	5	1
17	FW	(England)	Keanan Bennetts	1	0	0	0	0	0	1	0	2	0
18	MF	(Republic of Ireland)	Alan Judge	4	0	0	0	0	0	0	0	4	0
20	FW	(England)	Freddie Sears	1	0	0	0	0	0	0	0	1	0
21	MF	(England)	Flynn Downes	6	1	0	0	0	0	0	0	6	1
22	DF	(Democratic Republic of the Congo)	Aristote Nsiala	2	0	0	0	0	0	0	0	2	0
23	MF	(England)	Andre Dozzell	9	1	0	0	1	0	0	0	10	1
25	DF	(Republic of Ireland)	Aaron Drinan	2	0	0	0	0	0	0	0	2	0
29	GK	(Wales)	David Cornell	1	0	0	0	0	0	0	0	1	0
30	DF	(England)	Myles Kenlock	5	0	0	0	0	0	0	0	5	0
32	FW	(England)	Oliver Hawkins	1	0	1	0	0	0	0	0	2	0
33	MF	(England)	Josh Harrop	1	1	0	0	0	0	0	0	1	1
36	MF	(Albania)	Armando Dobra	2	0	0	0	0	0	0	0	2	0
41	DF	(England)	Luke Matheson	1	0	0	0	0	0	0	0	1	0
42	MF	(England)	Brett McGavin	2	0	0	0	0	0	0	0	2	0
48	MF	(England)	Liam Gibbs	0	0	0	0	0	0	1	0	1	0
Total				76	6	3	0	2	0	3	0	84	6

=== Captains ===
No.	Nat	Player	League One	FA Cup	EFL Cup	EFL Trophy	Total	Notes
3	(Republic of Ireland)	Stephen Ward	3	0	0	0	3	
4	(England)	Luke Chambers	38	0	1	1	40	Club captain
10	(England)	James Norwood	2	0	0	0	2	
21	(England)	Flynn Downes	2	0	0	0	2	
22	(Democratic Republic of the Congo)	Aristote Nsiala	0	1	1	0	2	
28	(Wales)	David Cornell	0	0	0	2	2	

== Awards ==
=== Player awards ===
Award	Player	Ref
Player of the Year	(Wales) James Wilson	

=== Greene King Player of the Month ===
Ipswich Town official player of the month award.

Month	Player
September	(England) Andre Dozzell
October	(England) Teddy Bishop

=== EFL League One Manager of the Month ===
Month	Manager	Ref
September	(Scotland) Paul Lambert	
