= Edwin Agbaje =

Irish footballer (born 2004)

Personal information
- Full name: Edwin Olamide Agbaje
- Date of birth: 25 January 2004 (age 22)
- Place of birth: Edenderry, Republic of Ireland
- Position: Defender

Team information
- Current team: Drogheda United
- Number: 2

Youth career
- Edenderry Town
- –2020: Shamrock Rovers
- 2020–2022: Ipswich Town

Senior career*
Years	Team	Apps	(Gls)
2022–2025	Ipswich Town	0	(0)
2023	→ Yeovil Town (loan)	10	(0)
2024–2025	→ Sutton United (loan)	1	(0)
2025	Sligo Rovers	9	(0)
2026–	Drogheda United	36	(2)

International career^{‡}
2019	Republic of Ireland U15	3	(0)
2020	Republic of Ireland U16	4	(1)
2021	Republic of Ireland U18	3	(0)
- * Club domestic league appearances and goals as of 17:35, 10 November 2026 (UTC) ‡ National team caps and goals as of 00:00, 18 October 2022 (UTC)

Edwin Olamide Agbaje (born 25 January 2004) is an Irish professional footballer who plays as a defender for League of Ireland First Division club Drogheda United.

== Career ==
=== Early career ===
A native of Edenderry, County Offaly, Agbaje began playing football with his local side Edenderry Town. He later joined League of Ireland club Shamrock Rovers before moving to Ipswich Town's Academy in 2020.

=== Ipswich Town ===
He made his first-team debut for the club on 18 October 2022, when he was described as being "impressive and composed" starting on the right side of the defence in a 1–0 defeat at Cambridge United in the EFL Trophy. The East Anglian Daily Times reported that he "grew in confidence and contributed to the attack". Manager Kieran McKenna described him as a "really hungry and determined young man".

==== Yeovil Town loan ====
On 27 January 2023, Agbaje joined National League side Yeovil Town on loan until the end of the season. On 22 March 2023, after suffering a season-ending injury Agbaje returned to Ipswich Town having made 10 appearances for Yeovil.

==== Sutton United loan ====
On 3 September 2024, Agbaje joined National League side Sutton United on loan until January 2025. On 16 January 2025, Agbaje returned to parent club Ipswich Town following the conclusion of his loan spell, having featured just once for Sutton United due to a hamstring injury.

=== Sligo Rovers ===
On 15 August 2025 he signed for League of Ireland Premier Division club Sligo Rovers on a short-term deal until the end of their season in November. He made 11 appearances in all competitions by the end of the season, helping them to preserve their Premier Division status on the final day of the season.

=== Drogheda United ===
On 15 December 2025, it was announced that Agbaje had signed for fellow League of Ireland Premier Division club Drogheda United on a two-year-contract. He scored 2 goals in 42 appearances in all competitions in 2026, as the club was relegated following a 2–1 defeat to UCD in the Promotion/Relegation Playoff.

== Style of play ==
Agbaje is an athletic right-back. He has also played as a centre back.

== Career statistics ==
As of match played 8 November 2026

Appearances and goals by club, season and competition
Club	Season	League			National Cup (Note: Includes FA Cup & FAI Cup)		League Cup (Note: Includes EFL Cup)		Other		Total	
Club	Season	Division	Apps	Goals	Apps	Goals	Apps	Goals	Apps	Goals	Apps	Goals
Ipswich Town	2022–23	League One	0	0	1	0	0	0	1 (Note: Appearance in the EFL Trophy)	0	2	0
Ipswich Town	2023–24	Championship	0	0	0	0	0	0	—		0	0
Ipswich Town	2024–25	Premier League	0	0	0	0	0	0	—		0	0
Ipswich Town	Total		0	0	1	0	0	0	1	0	2	0
Yeovil Town (loan)	2022–23	National League	10	0	—		—		0	0	10	0
Sutton United (loan)	2024–25	National League	1	0	0	0	—		0	0	1	0
Sligo Rovers	2025	LOI Premier Division	9	0	2	0	—		—		11	0
Drogheda United	2026	LOI Premier Division	36	2	3	0	—		3 (Note: 2 appearances in the Leinster Senior Cup; 1 appearance in the 2026 League of Ireland Play-offs)	0	42	2
Career total			56	2	6	0	0	0	4	0	66	2

== Honours ==
Individual

- Ipswich Town Young Player of the Year: 2022–23
