= Levi Andoh =

Dutch footballer (born 2000)

Personal information
- Full name: Levi Leslie Andoh
- Date of birth: 12 March 2000 (age 26)
- Place of birth: Amsterdam, Netherlands
- Height: 1.91 m (6 ft 3 in)
- Position: Defender

Team information
- Current team: Matlock Town

Youth career
- Aston Villa

College career
Years	Team	Apps	(Gls)
2018	Thompson Rivers University		

Senior career*
Years	Team	Apps	(Gls)
–2018	Cradley Town		
2019	Worcester City		
2019	Solihull United		
2020–2022	Ipswich Town	0	(0)
2020	→ Lowestoft Town (loan)	3	(0)
2021	→ Hereford (loan)	11	(0)
2022	Buxton	5	(0)
2022–2023	Hednesford Town	3	(0)
2023	Hereford	18	(1)
2023–2025	York City	4	(0)
2024	→ Darlington (loan)	5	(0)
2024–2025	→ Truro City (loan)	5	(0)
2025	→ Hereford (loan)	12	(1)
2025–2026	Kettering Town	9	(0)
2026–	Matlock Town	0	(0)
- * Club domestic league appearances and goals as of 06:40, 13 August 2025 (UTC)

Levi Leslie Andoh (born 12 March 2000) is a Dutch semi-professional footballer who plays as a defender for Northern Premier League Division One East side Matlock Town.

== Early and personal life ==
His parents are Ghanaian, but he was born in Amsterdam and moved to England at the age of 6.

== Career ==
Andoh joined Aston Villa's academy at the age of 6, before being released at the age of 14. He subsequently had trial spells at Port Vale, Walsall and Wolverhampton Wanderers, but was rejected by all three.

During the 2017–18 season, he played for Cradley Town, before playing for Thompson Rivers University between September 2018 and December 2018. He joined Worcester City in February 2019, before joining Solihull United later that year.

Following a trial spell at the club, in December 2019, he agreed to join EFL League One club Ipswich Town on a two-year contract from January 2020.

On 9 October 2020, he joined Lowestoft Town on loan for a month. He made 3 league appearances in the Southern League Premier Division Central and one appearance in the FA Trophy.

He made his debut for Ipswich on 10 November 2020, starting in a 2–0 EFL Trophy defeat away to Crawley Town. In August 2021, he went on trial with Dartford.

On 17 September 2021, it was announced that Andoh had joined Hereford, initially on a one-month loan. His loan was later extended, and he made 11 league appearances before returning to Ipswich in January 2022. Andoh was released at the end of the 2021–22 season.

In July 2022, Andoh had unsuccessful trials with both Portsmouth and Harrogate Town.

After short spells with both Buxton and Hednesford Town, Andoh re-joined Hereford on a permanent basis on 1 January 2023. That same day, he scored on his second Hereford debut, the equaliser in a 1–1 draw against Kidderminster Harriers. On 24 March 2023, it was announced that Andoh had left Hereford.

On 2 July 2023, Andoh signed for National League club York City, making his debut in the opening league fixture of the season. After just four games for the Minstermen, he suffered a spinal fracture which was to rule him out for the rest of the season.

In a bid to regain match fitness, in August 2024, Andoh joined National League North club Darlington on loan for a month, during which time he made six appearances. Andoh then began a period on loan to Truro City in the National League South in November 2024. He returned to Hereford for a third spell on 29 January 2025, joining on loan for the remainder of the season. He was ruled out for the remainder of the season after making 12 appearances, after breaking his collarbone against Scarborough Athletic on 15 March.

It was announced in May 2025 that his contract with York would not be extended and he would leave the club at the end of the 2024–25 season.

On 20 July, Andoh signed for Kettering Town.

Andoh signed for Northern Premier League Division One East side Matlock Town ahead of the 2026–27 season.

== Career statistics ==
As of match played 12 August 2025

Appearances and goals by club, season and competition
Club	Season	League			FA Cup		League Cup		Other		Total	
Club	Season	Division	Apps	Goals	Apps	Goals	Apps	Goals	Apps	Goals	Apps	Goals
Ipswich Town	2020–21	League One	0	0	0	0	0	0	1 (Note: Appearance(s) in EFL Trophy)	0	1	0
Ipswich Town	2021–22	League One	0	0	0	0	0	0	0	0	0	0
Ipswich Town	Total		0	0	0	0	0	0	1	0	1	0
Lowestoft Town (loan)	2020–21	SL Premier Division Central	3	0	0	0	—		1 (Note: Appearance(s) in FA Trophy)	0	4	0
Hereford (loan)	2021–22	National League North	11	0	4	0	—		1	0	16	0
Buxton	2022–23	National League North	5	0	0	0	—		0	0	5	0
Hednesford Town	2022–23	SL Premier Division Central	3	0	0	0	—		2 (Note: One appearance in FA Trophy; one appearance in Birmingham Senior Cup)	0	5	0
Hereford	2022–23	National League North	18	1	0	0	—		0	0	18	1
York City	2023–24	National League	4	0	0	0	—		1	0	5	0
York City	2024–25	National League	0	0	0	0	—		0	0	0	0
York City	Total		4	0	0	0	—		1	0	5	0
Darlington (loan)	2024–25	National League North	5	0	1	0	—		0	0	6	0
Truro City (loan)	2024–25	National League South	5	0	—		—		1	0	6	0
Hereford	2024–25	National League North	12	1	—		—		0	0	12	1
Kettering Town	2025–26	SL Premier Division Central	2	0	0	0	—		0	0	2	0
Career total			68	2	5	0	0	0	7	0	80	2
