= Brett McGavin =

English footballer

- McGavin with Yeovil Town in 2026

Personal information
- Full name: Brett McGavin
- Date of birth: 21 December 1999 (age 26)
- Place of birth: Bury St Edmunds, England
- Height: 1.83 m (6 ft 0 in)
- Position: Midfielder

Team information
- Current team: Yeovil Town
- Number: 14

Youth career
- 2009–2019: Ipswich Town

Senior career*
Years	Team	Apps	(Gls)
2019–2022	Ipswich Town	6	(0)
2018	→ Bury Town (loan)	5	(0)
2019	→ Concord Rangers (loan)	6	(1)
2021	→ Ayr United (loan)	1	(0)
2021–2022	→ King's Lynn Town (loan)	36	(3)
2022–2024	Torquay United	74	(11)
2024–	Yeovil Town	92	(13)
- * Club domestic league appearances and goals as of 19:36, 31 October 2026 (UTC)

Brett McGavin (born 21 December 1999) is an English professional footballer who plays as a midfielder for National League club Yeovil Town.

== Club career ==
=== Ipswich Town ===
McGavin progressed through the Ipswich Town's youth system having joined the Ipswich Town academy in 2009. He signed his first professional contract with the club on 8 February 2019. Following short loan spells at Bury Town and Concord Rangers, he made his debut for the club on 12 November 2019, starting in an EFL Trophy group stage match against Colchester United. On 6 May 2020, Ipswich took up the option to extend McGavin's contract by a further year, keeping him at the club until 2021. McGavin made four appearances during the 2019–20 season. He signed a new contract with Ipswich on 9 September 2020, signing a two-year deal with the option of an additional year extension. At the end of the 2021–22 season, McGavin left the club having reached the end of his contract.

==== Ayr United (loan) ====
On 1 February 2021 McGavin joined Scottish side Ayr United on loan for the remainder of the 2020–21 season. On 5 February 2021, McGavin made his debut for the club, coming on as a second-half substitute in a 1-0 defeat to Hearts. In March 2021, McGavin's loan spell ended.

==== King's Lynn Town (loan) ====
In August 2021 McGavin signed on loan for King's Lynn Town for the 2021–22 season. He made his debut for King's Lynn on 28 August, coming on as a second-half substitute in a game against Yeovil Town.

=== Torquay United ===
In 2022 McGavin was released by Ipswich, and signed a three-year deal for Torquay United.

=== Yeovil Town ===
On 4 June 2024, McGavin joined newly promoted National League side Yeovil Town on a two-year deal. He signed a new contract with Yeovil at the end of 2025–26 season, signing a two-year deal.

== Personal life ==
Brett is the son of former professional footballer Steve McGavin.

== Career statistics ==
As of match played 31 October 2026

Appearances and goals by club, season and competition
Club	Season	Division	League		FA Cup		EFL Cup		Other		Total	
Club	Season	Division	Apps	Goals	Apps	Goals	Apps	Goals	Apps	Goals	Apps	Goals
Ipswich Town	2019–20	League One	1	0	1	0	0	0	2 (Note: Appearance(s) in EFL Trophy)	0	4	0
Ipswich Town	2020–21	League One	5	0	1	0	0	0	1	0	7	0
Ipswich Town	2021–22	League One	0	0	0	0	0	0	0	0	0	0
Ipswich Town	Total		6	0	2	0	0	0	3	0	11	0
Bury Town (loan)	2017–18	IL North Division	5	0	0	0	—		0	0	5	0
Concord Rangers (loan)	2019–20	National League South	6	1	0	0	—		0	0	6	1
Ayr United (loan)	2020–21	Scottish Championship	1	0	0	0	0	0	—		1	0
King's Lynn Town (loan)	2021–22	National League	36	3	2	1	—		2 (Note: Appearance(s) in FA Trophy)	0	40	4
Torquay United	2022–23	National League	33	3	3	1	—		2	0	38	4
Torquay United	2023–24	National League South	41	8	3	1	—		3	0	47	9
Torquay United	Total		74	11	6	2	—		5	0	85	13
Yeovil Town	2024–25	National League	39	7	1	0	—		1	0	41	7
Yeovil Town	2025–26	National League	37	2	1	0	—		4	0	42	2
Yeovil Town	2026–27	National League	16	4	2	1	—		0	0	18	5
Yeovil Town	Total		92	13	4	1	—		5	0	101	14
Career total			220	28	14	4	0	0	15	0	249	32
