= Dylan Crowe =

English footballer (born 2001)

Personal information
- Full name: Dylan Crowe
- Date of birth: 13 April 2001 (age 25)
- Place of birth: Lambeth, England
- Position: Defender

Team information
- Current team: FC Halifax Town
- Number: 23

Youth career
- 2013–2020: Ipswich Town

Senior career*
Years	Team	Apps	(Gls)
2020–2022	Ipswich Town	0	(0)
2021	→ Leiston (loan)	1	(0)
2022–2024	Torquay United	33	(1)
2023	→ Havant & Waterlooville (loan)	2	(0)
2024–2025	King's Lynn Town	62	(0)
2025–	FC Halifax Town	0	(0)

International career^{‡}
- England U15
- England U16
2018	England U17	7	(0)
2018–2019	England U18	4	(0)
- * Club domestic league appearances and goals as of 18:33, 29 June 2025 (UTC) ‡ National team caps and goals as of 22:50, 22 June 2022 (UTC)

Dylan Crowe (born 13 April 2001) is an English professional footballer who plays as a defender for National League club FC Halifax Town.

== Club career ==
Crowe joined Ipswich Town's academy at the age of 12. He signed as a full-time scholar in 2017. Crowe signed his first professional contract with Ipswich in July 2019, signing a three-year contract.

He made his debut on 10 November 2020 in a 2–0 EFL Trophy defeat to Crawley Town.

Dylan signed for Leiston on loan.

Crowe was released by the club at the end of the 2021–22 season.

On 30 June 2022, following his release from Ipswich, Crowe signed for National League club Torquay United. In September 2023, he joined Havant & Waterlooville on loan.

On 12 January 2024, it was announced he had left National League South side Torquay United to join King's Lynn Town on a permanent deal. He made his debut the following day, coming off the bench in a 2–2 away draw to Buxton in the National League North.

On 28 June 2025, Crowe joined National League side FC Halifax Town, following manager Adam Lakeland from the Linnets.

== International career ==
He has represented England at under-15, under-16, under-17 and under-18 levels.

== Career statistics ==
As of match played 15 January 2024

Appearances and goals by club, season and competition
Club	Season	League			FA Cup		EFL Cup		Other		Total	
Club	Season	Division	Apps	Goals	Apps	Goals	Apps	Goals	Apps	Goals	Apps	Goals
Ipswich Town	2020–21	League One	0	0	0	0	0	0	1 (Note: Appearance(s) in EFL Trophy)	0	1	0
Leiston (loan)	2021–22	Southern League Premier Division Central	1	0	2	0	—		0	0	3	0
Torquay United	2022–23	National League	22	1	4	0	—		3 (Note: Appearance(s) in FA Trophy)	0	29	1
Torquay United	2023–24	National League South	11	0	0	0	—		2	0	13	0
Torquay United	Total		33	1	4	0	0	0	5	0	42	1
Havant & Waterlooville (loan)	2023–24	National League South	2	0	1	0	—		0	0	3	0
King's Lynn Town	2023–24	National League North	2	0	0	0	—		0	0	2	0
Career total			38	1	7	0	0	0	6	0	51	1
