= Tommy Hughes (footballer, born 2000) =

English footballer

Thomas Hughes
Personal information
- Full name: Thomas Hughes
- Date of birth: 28 October 2000 (age 26)
- Place of birth: Ipswich, England
- Height: 1.75 m (5 ft 9 in)
- Position: Midfielder

Team information
- Current team: Bury Town

Youth career
- 2017–2019: Ipswich Town

Senior career*
Years	Team	Apps	(Gls)
2019–2023	Ipswich Town	0	(0)
2018	→ Bury Town (loan)	5	(0)
2019	→ Lowestoft Town (loan)	3	(1)
2019	→ Leiston (loan)	2	(1)
2022	→ Torquay United (loan)	2	(0)
2023-2025	King's Lynn Town	71	(7)
2025–	Bury Town	9	(0)
- * Club domestic league appearances and goals as of 02:56, 12 July 2025 (UTC)

Thomas Hughes (born 28 October 2000) is an English semi-professional footballer who plays as a midfielder for Bury Town.

== Club career ==
He made his debut for the club on 8 October 2019 coming on as a substitute in a 4–0 win over Gillingham in the EFL Trophy. He made 3 substitute appearances in both the EFL Trophy and FA Cup during the season. On 12 June 2020 it was announced that Hughes would sign his first professional contract with Ipswich on 1 July 2020, signing a one-year deal with the option of a further year extension. Hughes left the club in January 2023 at the end of his contract and joined King's Lynn Town F.C

== Career statistics ==
As of match played 20 November 2019

Appearances and goals by club, season and competition
Club	Season	League			FA Cup		EFL Cup		Other		Total	
Club	Season	Division	Apps	Goals	Apps	Goals	Apps	Goals	Apps	Goals	Apps	Goals
Ipswich Town	2019–20	League One	0	0	1	0	0	0	2 (Note: Appearances in EFL Trophy)	0	3	0
Career total			0	0	1	0	0	0	2	0	3	0
