= 2017–18 EFL Cup =

Carabao Cup, League Cup

Tournament details
- Country: England; Wales
- Dates: 8 August 2017 – 25 February 2018
- Teams: 92

Final positions
- Champions: Manchester City (5th title)
- Runners-up: Arsenal

Tournament statistics
- Matches played: 87
- Goals scored: 258 (2.97 per match)
- Attendance: 1,454,812 (16,722 per match)
- Top goal scorer(s): Josh Murphy; Samuel Sáiz; Islam Slimani (4 goals each)

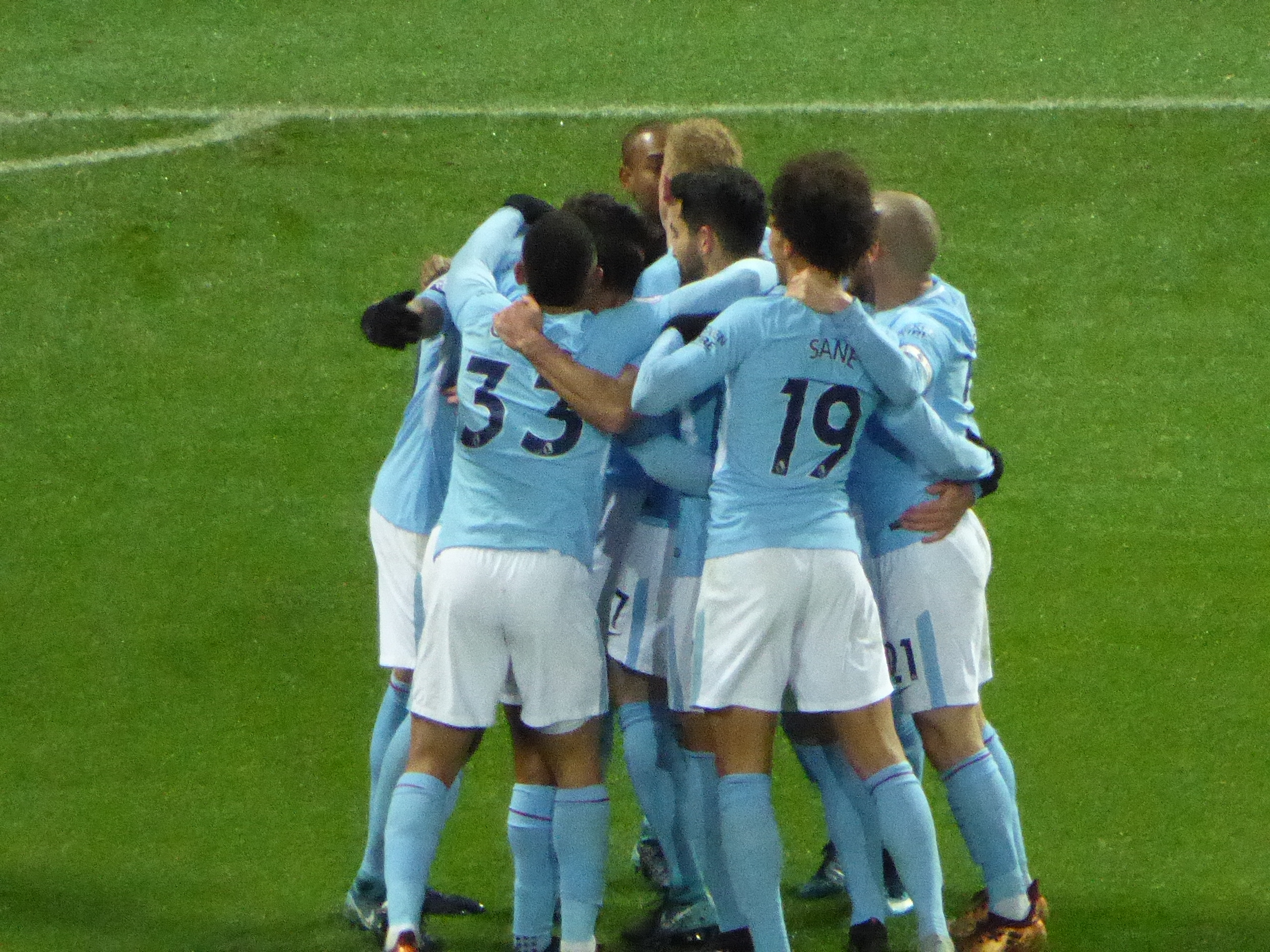
Winning team Manchester City (pictured)

The 2017–18 EFL Cup was the 58th season of the EFL Cup. The competition was open to all 92 clubs participating in the Premier League and the English Football League. It was known as the Carabao Cup due to the start of a sponsorship deal with Carabao Energy Drinks after the tournament was unsponsored the previous year. The final took place at Wembley Stadium in London.

Manchester City won their fifth title after a 3–0 win over Arsenal in the final.

Manchester United were the defending champions, but were eliminated by Bristol City in the fifth round.

== Access ==
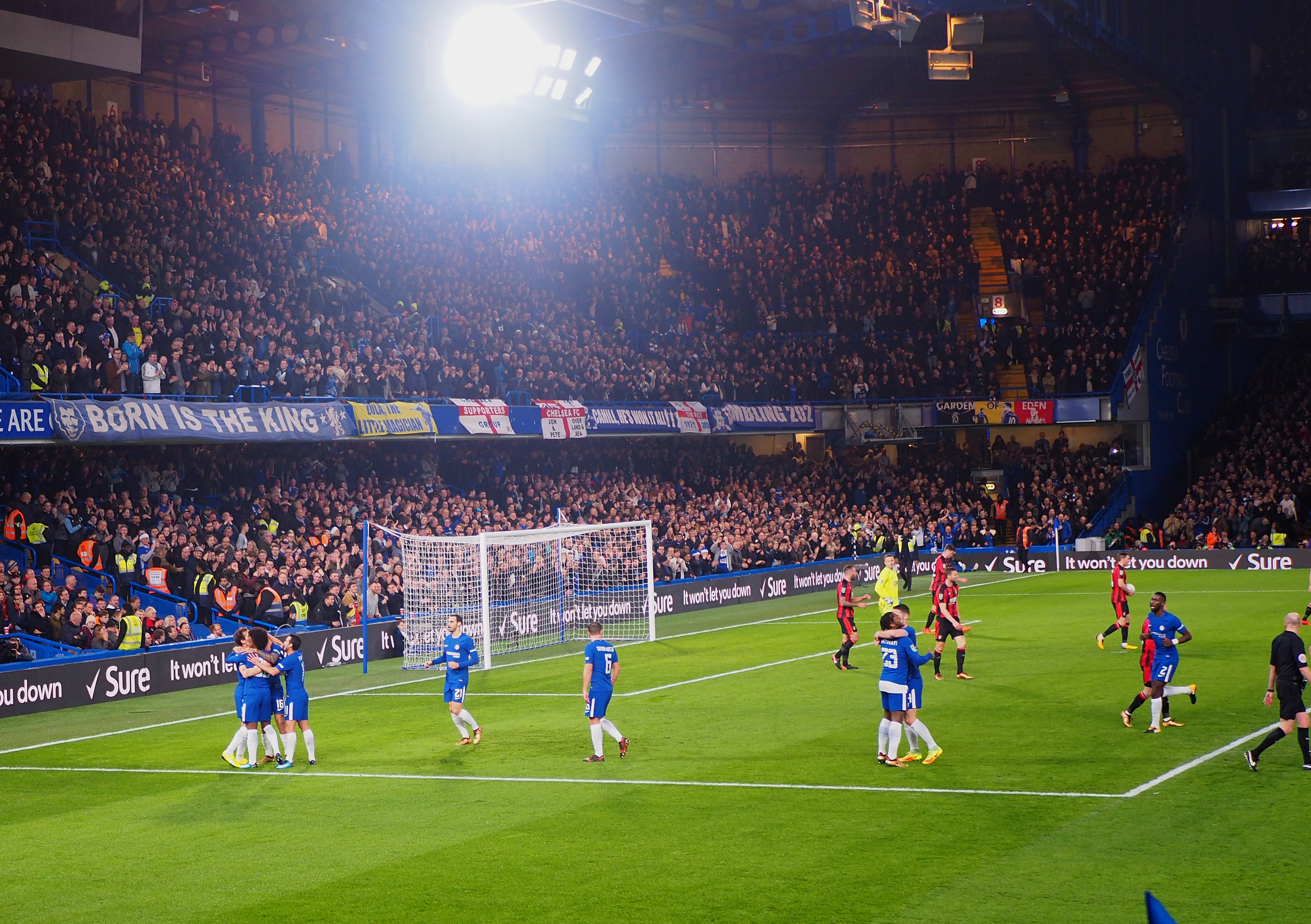
Chelsea v Bournemouth (20 Dec 2017)

All 92 clubs in the top four divisions of English football participate. In the first round, all the clubs in EFL League Two and EFL League One will enter alongside 22 of the 24 EFL Championship teams except for Hull City and Middlesbrough who received byes to the next round as the highest finishing teams relegated from the 2016–17 Premier League. In the second round, all Premier League clubs not involved in European competition enter. Arsenal, Chelsea, Everton, Liverpool, Manchester City, Manchester United and Tottenham Hotspur all received byes to the third round owing to their participation in the UEFA Champions League and UEFA Europa League.

In June 2017, the English Football League announced that the draw for the first round of the competition would be held in Bangkok, Thailand, as a result of their new sponsorship deal with Thai company Carabao. There were plans for the 2017–18 EFL Cup to trial video assistant referees during matches in their first use in England. However the plans were scrapped due to a delay and would instead be trialled in the 2017–18 FA Cup from the third round instead.

=== Distribution ===
- Clubs involved in European competition entered at the third round.
- The remaining Premier League clubs and two Championship clubs who finished 18th and 19th in Premier League the previous season entered at the second round.
- The remaining English Football League clubs entered at the first round.

| | Clubs entering in this round | Clubs advancing from previous round |
|---|---|---|
| First round (70 clubs) | 24 clubs from EFL League Two; 24 clubs from EFL League One; 22 clubs from EFL Championship | N/A |
| Second round (50 clubs) | 2 clubs from EFL Championship; 13 Premier League clubs (not involved in European competition) | 35 winners from first round |
| Third round (32 clubs) | 7 Premier League clubs (involved in European competition) | 25 winners from second round |
| Fourth round (16 clubs) | No other entries | 16 winners from third round |
| Quarter-finals (8 clubs) | No other entries | 8 winners from fourth round |
| Semi-finals (4 clubs) | No other entries | 4 winners from quarter-finals |
| Final (2 clubs) | No other entries | 2 winners from semi-finals |

== First round ==
=== Entry ===
A total of 70 clubs played in the first round: 24 from League Two (tier 4), 24 from League One (tier 3), and 22 from the Championship (tier 2). The draw for this round was split on a geographical basis into 'northern' and 'southern' sections. Teams were drawn against a team from the same section.

=== Matches ===
The first round draw was made as follows:

==== Northern section ====
| 8 August 2017 | Accrington Stanley (4) | 3–2 | Preston North End (2) | Accrington |
| 19:45 BST | Richards-Everton 20'; Clark 86'; Kee 90+3' | Report | Hugill 70', 90+1' | Stadium: Crown Ground; Attendance: 2,879; Referee: Eddie Ilderton |

| 8 August 2017 | Barnsley (2) | 4–3 | Morecambe (4) | Barnsley |
| 19:45 BST | Bradshaw 2', 46'; Lund 22' (o.g.); Hedges 90+5' | Report | Lavelle 45+1'; Rose 49' (pen.); Oliver 82' | Stadium: Oakwell; Attendance: 4,062; Referee: Darren Bond |

| 8 August 2017 | Bradford City (3) | 2–3 | Doncaster Rovers (3) | Bradford |
| 19:45 BST | Poleon 35'; Jones 84' | Report | May 8'; Kongolo 71'; Whiteman 88' | Stadium: Valley Parade; Attendance: 3,175; Referee: Darren Drysdale |

| 8 August 2017 | Coventry City (4) | 1–3 | Blackburn Rovers (3) | Rowleys Green, Coventry |
| 19:45 BST | Nazon 22' | Report | Evans 16'; Smallwood 33'; Samuel 56' | Stadium: Ricoh Arena; Attendance: 5,372; Referee: Darren England (England) |

| 8 August 2017 | Fleetwood Town (3) | 1–2 (a.e.t.) | Carlisle United (4) | Fleetwood |
| 19:45 BST | Hiwula 69' | Report | S. Miller 22'; T. Miller 101' | Stadium: Highbury Stadium; Attendance: 1,711; Referee: Graham Salisbury |

| 8 August 2017 | Mansfield Town (4) | 0–1 | Rochdale (3) | Mansfield |
| 19:45 BST | | Report | Camps 17' | Stadium: Field Mill; Attendance: 1,457; Referee: Andy Madley |

| 8 August 2017 | Nottingham Forest (2) | 2–1 | Shrewsbury Town (3) | Nottingham |
| 19:45 BST | Carayol 29' (pen.); Cummings 75' | Report | Whalley 79' (pen.) | Stadium: City Ground; Attendance: 7,546; Referee: John Busby |

| 8 August 2017 | Rotherham United (3) | 2–1 | Lincoln City (4) | Rotherham |
| 19:45 BST | Proctor 39'; Forde 78' | Report | Knott 64' | Stadium: New York Stadium; Attendance: 5,489; Referee: Seb Stockbridge |

| 8 August 2017 | Scunthorpe United (3) | 3–3 (a.e.t.) (6–5 p) | Notts County (4) | Scunthorpe |
| 19:45 BST | Madden 69' (pen.), 105+1'; Holmes 86' | Report | Grant 22'; Brisley 90+2'; Yates 117' | Stadium: Glanford Park; Attendance: 1,874; Referee: David Webb |
| | Penalties |
| | Madden (penalty scored); Van Veen (penalty scored); Adelakun (penalty scored); Townsend (penalty scored); Redmond (penalty scored); Holmes (penalty scored) | | (penalty scored) Smith; (penalty scored) Thompson; (penalty scored) Milsom; (penalty scored) Brisley; (penalty scored) Forte; (penalty missed) Toolte |

| 8 August 2017 | Sheffield Wednesday (2) | 4–1 | Chesterfield (4) | Owlerton, Sheffield |
| 19:45 BST | Fletcher 45+2'; Hooper 43'; Bannan 75'; Hutchinson 83' | Report | Dennis 38' (pen.) | Stadium: Hillsborough Stadium; Attendance: 11,682; Referee: Ross Joyce |

| 8 August 2017 | Wigan Athletic (3) | 2–1 | Blackpool (3) | Wigan |
| 19:45 BST | Laurent 17'; Flores 45+1' | Report | Gnanduillet 59' | Stadium: DW Stadium; Attendance: 3,391; Referee: Chris Sarginson |

| 9 August 2017 | Crewe Alexandra (4) | 1–2 | Bolton Wanderers (2) | Crewe |
| 19:45 BST | Porter 42' | Report | Armstrong 70'; Derik 81' | Stadium: Gresty Road; Attendance: 3,167; Referee: Mark Heywood |

| 9 August 2017 | Leeds United (2) | 4–1 | Port Vale (4) | Leeds |
| 19:45 BST | Sáiz 13', 60', 62'; Ekuban 83' | Report | Tonge 36' | Stadium: Elland Road; Attendance: 15,431; Referee: Peter Bankes |

| 9 August 2017 | Oldham Athletic (3) | 2–3 | Burton Albion (2) | Oldham |
| 19:45 BST | Green 55'; Davies 67' (pen.) | Report | Varney 47'; Lund 69'; Akins 86' (pen.) | Stadium: Boundary Park; Attendance: 2,176; Referee: Scott Duncan |

| 9 August 2017 | Sheffield United (2) | 3–2 | Walsall (3) | Sheffield |
| 19:45 BST | Roberts 74' (o.g.); Thomas 79'; Lafferty 82' | Report | Bakayoko 13'; Oztumer 90+1' (pen.) | Stadium: Bramall Lane; Attendance: 5,210; Referee: Kevin Friend |

| 10 August 2017 | Bury (3) | 0–1 | Sunderland (2) | Bury, Greater Manchester |
| 19:45 BST | | Report | Honeyman 69' | Stadium: Gigg Lane; Attendance: 3,470; Referee: Robert Jones |

| 22 August 2017 (Note: Fixture rearranged after the original tie on 8 August was abandoned due to torrential rain.) | Grimsby Town (4) | 0–1 | Derby County (2) | Cleethorpes |
| 19:45 BST | | Report | Vydra 53' (pen.) | Stadium: Blundell Park; Attendance: 3,033; Referee: Trevor Kettle |

==== Southern section ====
| 8 August 2017 | AFC Wimbledon (3) | 1–3 (a.e.t.) | Brentford (2) | Kingston upon Thames, London |
| 19:45 BST | Robinson 25' | Report | Sawyers 69'; Watkins 105+1'; Shaibu 119' | Stadium: Kingsmeadow; Attendance: 3,229; Referee: Dean Whitestone |

| 8 August 2017 | Birmingham City (2) | 5–1 | Crawley Town (4) | Bordesley, Birmingham |
| 19:45 BST | Adams 27', 42', 66'; Davis 38'; Tesche 49' | Report | Camara 86' | Stadium: St Andrew's; Attendance: 7,814; Referee: Michael Salisbury |

| 8 August 2017 | Bristol City (2) | 5–0 | Plymouth Argyle (3) | Ashton Gate, Bristol |
| 19:45 BST | Hegeler 2'; Baker 14'; Smith 19'; Hinds 39'; Paterson 79' | Report | | Stadium: Ashton Gate Stadium; Attendance: 9,838; Referee: Oliver Langford |

| 8 August 2017 | Bristol Rovers (3) | 4–1 | Cambridge United (4) | Horfield, Bristol |
| 19:45 BST | Bodin 13', 42'; Harrison 61'; Sercombe 70' | Report | Ikpeazu 66' | Stadium: Memorial Stadium; Attendance: 4,114; Referee: Kevin Johnson |

| 8 August 2017 | Cardiff City (2) | 2–1 (a.e.t.) | Portsmouth (3) | Cardiff |
| 19:45 BST | Mendez-Laing 48'; Halford 113' | Report | Morrison 32' (o.g.) | Stadium: Cardiff City Stadium; Attendance: 6,592; Referee: Steve Martin |

| 8 August 2017 | Exeter City (4) | 1–2 | Charlton Athletic (3) | Exeter |
| 19:45 BST | Holmes 54' | Report | Clarke 72'; Charles-Cook 79' | Stadium: St James Park; Attendance: 2,699; Referee: Tim Robinson |

| 8 August 2017 | Forest Green Rovers (4) | 0–1 (a.e.t.) | Milton Keynes Dons (3) | Nailsworth |
| 19:45 BST | | Report | Ariyibi 110' | Stadium: The New Lawn; Attendance: 1,608; Referee: Anthony Backhouse |

| 8 August 2017 | Luton Town (4) | 0–2 | Ipswich Town (2) | Luton |
| 19:45 BST | | Report | McGoldrick 34', 90+3' | Stadium: Kenilworth Road; Attendance: 4,610; Referee: Andy Haines |

| 8 August 2017 | Millwall (2) | 2–0 | Stevenage (4) | Bermondsey, London |
| 19:45 BST | Elliott 54', 67' | Report | | Stadium: The Den; Attendance: 3,096; Referee: Simon Hooper |

| 8 August 2017 | Norwich City (2) | 3–2 | Swindon Town (4) | Norwich |
| 19:45 BST | Jerome 27'; Hoolahan 39'; Maddison 42' | Report | Lancashire 25'; Mullin 62' | Stadium: Carrow Road; Attendance: 13,166; Referee: Geoff Eltringham |

| 8 August 2017 | Oxford United (3) | 3–4 (a.e.t.) | Cheltenham Town (4) | Oxford |
| 19:45 BST | Johnson 21' (pen.); Obika 31'; Xemi 42' | Report | Eisa 9', 99'; Wright 66', 90' | Stadium: Kassam Stadium; Attendance: 3,179; Referee: Graham Horwood |

| 8 August 2017 | Peterborough United (3) | 1–3 | Barnet (4) | Peterborough |
| 19:45 BST | Edwards 30' | Report | Akpa Akpro 22'; Vilhete 39'; Coulthirst 58' | Stadium: London Road Stadium; Attendance: 2,725; Referee: Tony Harrington |

| 8 August 2017 | Queens Park Rangers (2) | 1–0 | Northampton Town (3) | Shepherd's Bush, London |
| 19:45 BST | N'Gbakoto 36' | Report | | Stadium: Loftus Road; Attendance: 4,317; Referee: Charles Breakspear |

| 8 August 2017 | Southend United (3) | 0–2 | Newport County (4) | Southend-on-Sea (Note: Although these matches were originally drawn as home ties for Newport County, it was agreed to reverse the fixtures due to ongoing works at Rodney Parade.) |
| 19:45 BST | | Report | McCoulsky 52', 58' | Stadium: Roots Hall; Attendance: 2,998; Referee: Antony Coggins |

| 8 August 2017 | Wolverhampton Wanderers (2) | 1–0 | Yeovil Town (4) | Wolverhampton |
| 19:45 BST | Dicko 76' | Report | | Stadium: Molineux Stadium; Attendance: 9,478; Referee: Robert Lewis |

| 8 August 2017 | Wycombe Wanderers (4) | 0–2 | Fulham (2) | High Wycombe |
| 19:45 BST | | Report | Piazon 67'; Odoi 81' | Stadium: Adams Park; Attendance: 3,639; Referee: Gavin Ward |

| 8 August 2017 | Reading (2) | 2–0 | Gillingham (3) | Reading |
| 20:00 BST | Kelly 71', 86' | Report | | Stadium: Madejski Stadium; Attendance: 5,936; Referee: Brett Huxtable |

| 9 August 2017 | Colchester United (4) | 1–2 | Aston Villa (2) | Colchester |
| 19:45 BST | Kent 39' | Report | Hogan 7'; Kent 19' (o.g.) | Stadium: Colchester Community Stadium; Attendance: 6,603; Referee: John Brooks |

Note: The numbers in parentheses are the tier for the team during the 2017–18 season.

== Second round ==
=== Entry ===
A total of 50 clubs played in the second round: 15 that entered in this round and the 35 winners from the first round. The 15 clubs entering this round were the 13 clubs from the 2017–18 Premier League not involved in any European competition, plus two clubs from the EFL Championship. The two clubs from the Championship are the two clubs that finished 18th and 19th in the 2016–17 Premier League. The draw for the second round was held on 10 August 2017 and was split on a geographical basis into 'northern' and 'southern' sections. Teams were drawn against a team from the same section.

=== Matches ===
The second round draw was made as follows:

==== Northern section ====
| 22 August 2017 | Accrington Stanley (4) | 1–3 | West Bromwich Albion (1) | Accrington |
| 19:45 BST | Dallison 86' | Report | Rondón 11'; Phillips 31'; Rodriguez 64' | Stadium: Crown Ground; Attendance: 2,699; Referee: Jeremy Simpson |

| 22 August 2017 | Aston Villa (2) | 4–1 | Wigan Athletic (3) | Birmingham |
| 19:45 BST | Hogan 19', 44'; Adomah 36'; Bjarnason 74' | Report | Colclough 43' | Stadium: Villa Park; Attendance: 18,108; Referee: Darren Drysdale |

| 22 August 2017 | Bolton Wanderers (2) | 3–2 | Sheffield Wednesday (2) | Bolton |
| 20:00 BST | Dervite 42'; Armstrong 57' (pen.); Karacan 64' | Report | Rhodes 76', 83' | Stadium: Macron Stadium; Attendance: 6,385; Referee: David Webb |

| 22 August 2017 | Carlisle United (4) | 1–2 | Sunderland (2) | Carlisle |
| 19:45 BST | Grainger 60' | Report | Love 25'; Gooch 80' | Stadium: Brunton Park; Attendance: 8,187; Referee: Darren Bond |

| 22 August 2017 | Doncaster Rovers (3) | 2–0 | Hull City (2) | Doncaster |
| 19:45 BST | May 48'; Rowe 54' | Report | | Stadium: Keepmoat Stadium; Attendance: 7,139; Referee: Graham Salisbury |

| 22 August 2017 | Leeds United (2) | 5–1 | Newport County (4) | Leeds |
| 19:45 BST | Roofe 44', 49', 65'; Sáiz 78'; Vieira 89' | Report | Labadie 33' | Stadium: Elland Road; Attendance: 17,098; Referee: Ross Joyce |

| 22 August 2017 | Middlesbrough (2) | 3–0 | Scunthorpe United (3) | Middlesbrough |
| 19:45 BST | Fábio 17'; Baker 30'; Fletcher 55' | Report | | Stadium: Riverside Stadium; Attendance: 12,679; Referee: Andrew Madley |

| 22 August 2017 | Sheffield United (2) | 1–4 | Leicester City (1) | Sheffield |
| 19:45 BST | Lavery 83' | Report | Gray 52'; Slimani 63', 67'; Musa 90+3' | Stadium: Bramall Lane; Attendance: 11,280; Referee: Tony Harrington |

| 23 August 2017 | Blackburn Rovers (3) | 0–2 | Burnley (1) | Blackburn |
| 19:45 BST | | Report | Cork 27'; Brady 45+4' | Stadium: Ewood Park; Attendance: 16,313; Referee: Simon Hooper |

| 23 August 2017 | Huddersfield Town (1) | 2–1 | Rotherham United (3) | Huddersfield |
| 19:45 BST | Billing 52' (pen.); Lolley 54' | Report | Ajayi 1' | Stadium: Kirklees Stadium; Attendance: 8,290; Referee: Peter Bankes |

| 23 August 2017 | Newcastle United (1) | 2–3 (a.e.t.) | Nottingham Forest (2) | Newcastle upon Tyne |
| 19:45 BST | Mitrović 3'; Aarons 45+1' | Report | Cummings 29', 31'; Walker 97' | Stadium: St. James' Park; Attendance: 27,709; Referee: Darren England |

| 23 August 2017 | Stoke City (1) | 4–0 | Rochdale (3) | Stoke-on-Trent |
| 19:45 BST | Allen 16', 42'; Crouch 29'; Sobhi 80' | Report | | Stadium: Bet365 Stadium; Attendance: 9,930; Referee: Scott Duncan |

| 12 September 2017 | Barnsley (2) | 3–2 | Derby County (2) | Barnsley |
| 19:45 BST | Jackson 18'; Bradshaw 73'; Hammill 88' | Report | Russell 6'; Bennett 39' | Stadium: Oakwell; Attendance: 7,163; Referee: Eddie Ilderton |

==== Southern section ====
| 22 August 2017 | Birmingham (2) | 1–2 | Bournemouth (1) | Birmingham |
| 19:45 BST | Kieftenbeld 11' | Report | Fraser 46'; Pugh 68' | Stadium: St Andrew's; Attendance: 8,245; Referee: Geoff Eltringham |

| 22 August 2017 | Brighton & Hove Albion (1) | 1–0 | Barnet (4) | Brighton |
| 19:45 BST | Tilley 53' | Report | | Stadium: Falmer Stadium; Attendance: 11,414; Referee: Steve Martin |

| 22 August 2017 | Cardiff City (2) | 1–2 | Burton Albion (2) | Cardiff, Wales |
| 19:45 BST | Pilkington 76' | Report | Naylor 26'; Fox 70' | Stadium: Cardiff City Stadium; Attendance: 5,820; Referee: John Busby |

| 22 August 2017 | Crystal Palace (1) | 2–1 | Ipswich Town (2) | Selhurst, London |
| 19:30 BST | McArthur 76', 84' | Report | Celina 90+1' | Stadium: Selhurst Park; Attendance: 9,837; Referee: Andy Davies |

| 22 August 2017 | Fulham (2) | 0–1 | Bristol Rovers (3) | Fulham, London |
| 19:45 BST | | Report | Harrison 13' | Stadium: Craven Cottage; Attendance: 6,243; Referee: Dean Whitestone |

| 22 August 2017 | Milton Keynes Dons (3) | 1–4 | Swansea City (1) | Milton Keynes |
| 19:45 BST | Seager 17' | Report | Fer 19', 60'; Abraham 71'; Ayew 86' | Stadium: Stadium mk Attendance: 5,162; Referee: Robert Jones |

| 22 August 2017 | Norwich City (2) | 4–1 | Charlton Athletic (3) | Norwich |
| 19:45 BST | Murphy 21', 52'; Watkins 74'; Trybull 89' | Report | Novak 5' | Stadium: Carrow Road; Attendance: 12,521; Referee: Andy Haines |

| 22 August 2017 | Queens Park Rangers (2) | 1–4 | Brentford (2) | Shepherd's Bush, London |
| 19:45 BST | Furlong 43' | Report | Borysiuk 10' (o.g.); Egan 19'; Maupay 32'; Clarke 83' | Stadium: Loftus Road; Attendance: 9,719; Referee: Chris Sarginson |

| 22 August 2017 | Reading (2) | 3–1 (a.e.t.) | Millwall (2) | Reading |
| 20:00 BST | Bacuna 34'; Evans 105'; Smith 117' | Report | Ferguson 37' | Stadium: Madejski Stadium; Attendance: 7,148; Referee: Charles Breakspear |

| 22 August 2017 | Watford (1) | 2–3 | Bristol City (2) | Watford |
| 19:45 BST | Capoue 47'; Mariappa 90+5' | Report | Hinds 59'; Reid 67'; Eliasson 90+3' | Stadium: Vicarage Road; Attendance: 9,003; Referee: Tim Robinson |

| 23 August 2017 | Cheltenham Town (4) | 0–2 | West Ham United (1) | Cheltenham (Note: Although this match was originally drawn as a home tie for West Ham United, it was agreed to reverse the fixture due to the 2017 World Championships in Athletics taking place at London Stadium.) |
| 19:45 BST | | Report | Sakho 40'; Ayew 43' | Stadium: Whaddon Road; Attendance: 6,259; Referee: Oliver Langford |

| 23 August 2017 | Southampton (1) | 0–2 | Wolverhampton Wanderers (2) | Southampton |
| 19:45 BST | | Report | Batth 67'; Wilson 87' | Stadium: St. Mary's Stadium; Attendance: 17,931; Referee: James Linington |

Note: The numbers in parentheses are the tier for the team during the 2017–18 season.

== Third round ==
=== Entry ===
A total of 32 clubs played in the third round: seven that entered in this round and the 25 winners from the second round. The clubs entering in this round were the seven from the 2017–18 Premier League involved in European competition. The draw for the third round was held on 24 August 2017.

=== Matches ===
The third round draw was made as follows:

| 19 September 2017 | Aston Villa (2) | 0–2 | Middlesbrough (2) | Birmingham |
| 19:45 BST | | Report | Bamford 58' (pen.), 67' | Stadium: Villa Park; Attendance: 11,197; Referee: Steve Martin |

| 19 September 2017 | Bournemouth (1) | 1–0 (a.e.t.) | Brighton & Hove Albion (1) | Bournemouth |
| 19:45 BST | King 99' | Report | | Stadium: Dean Court; Attendance: 10,372; Referee: Kevin Friend |

| 19 September 2017 | Brentford (2) | 1–3 | Norwich City (2) | Brentford, London |
| 19:45 BST | Clarke 90+1' | Report | Vrančić 10' (pen.), 51'; Murphy 68' | Stadium: Griffin Park; Attendance: 4,863; Referee: James Linington |

| 19 September 2017 | Bristol City (2) | 2–0 | Stoke City (1) | Bristol |
| 19:45 BST | Diédhiou 50'; Taylor 60' | Report | | Stadium: Ashton Gate; Attendance: 13,826; Referee: Geoff Eltringham |

| 19 September 2017 | Burnley (1) | 2–2 (a.e.t.) (3–5 p) | Leeds United (2) | Burnley |
| 19:45 BST | Wood 89' (pen.); Brady 90+6' | Report | Sacko 80'; Hernández 90+4' (pen.) | Stadium: Turf Moor; Attendance: 11,799; Referee: Darren Bond |
| | Penalties |
| | Wood (penalty scored); Barnes (penalty scored); Brady (penalty scored); Tarkowski (penalty missed) | | (penalty scored) Lasogga; (penalty scored) Hernández; (penalty scored) Klich; (penalty scored) Alioski; (penalty scored) Dallas |

| 19 September 2017 | Crystal Palace (1) | 1–0 | Huddersfield Town (1) | Selhurst, London |
| 19:45 BST | Sako 13' | Report | | Stadium: Selhurst Park; Attendance: 6,607; Referee: Lee Probert |

| 19 September 2017 | Leicester City (1) | 2–0 | Liverpool (1) | Leicester |
| 19:45 BST | Okazaki 65'; Slimani 78' | Report | | Stadium: King Power Stadium; Attendance: 31,609; Referee: Stuart Attwell |

| 19 September 2017 | Reading (2) | 0–2 | Swansea City (1) | Reading |
| 20:00 BST | | Report | Mawson 52'; J. Ayew 83' | Stadium: Madejski Stadium; Attendance: 8,729; Referee: Andy Davies |

| 19 September 2017 | Tottenham Hotspur (1) | 1–0 | Barnsley (2) | Wembley, London |
| 20:00 BST | Alli 65' | Report | | Stadium: Wembley Stadium; Attendance: 23,826; Referee: Tim Robinson |

| 19 September 2017 | West Ham United (1) | 3–0 | Bolton Wanderers (2) | Stratford, London |
| 19:45 BST | Ogbonna 4'; Sakho 31'; Masuaku 90+4' | Report | | Stadium: London Stadium; Attendance: 35,806; Referee: Simon Hooper |

| 19 September 2017 | Wolverhampton Wanderers (2) | 1–0 (a.e.t.) | Bristol Rovers (3) | Wolverhampton |
| 19:45 BST | Enobakhare 98' | Report | | Stadium: Molineux Stadium; Attendance: 12,740; Referee: Tony Harrington |

| 20 September 2017 | Arsenal (1) | 1–0 | Doncaster Rovers (3) | Holloway, London |
| 19:45 BST | Walcott 25' | Report | | Stadium: Emirates Stadium; Attendance: 44,064; Referee: Scott Duncan |

| 20 September 2017 | Chelsea (1) | 5–1 | Nottingham Forest (2) | Fulham, London |
| 19:45 BST | Kenedy 13'; Batshuayi 19', 53', 86'; Musonda 40' | Report | Darikwa 90+1' | Stadium: Stamford Bridge; Attendance: 40,621; Referee: Chris Kavanagh |

| 20 September 2017 | Everton (1) | 3–0 | Sunderland (2) | Liverpool |
| 19:45 BST | Calvert-Lewin 38', 51'; Niasse 83' | Report | | Stadium: Goodison Park; Attendance: 23,000; Referee: Oliver Langford |

| 20 September 2017 | Manchester United (1) | 4–1 | Burton Albion (2) | Old Trafford, Manchester |
| 20:00 BST | Rashford 5', 17'; Lingard 36'; Martial 60' | Report | Dyer 90+1' | Stadium: Old Trafford; Attendance: 54,256; Referee: Graham Scott |

| 20 September 2017 | West Bromwich Albion (1) | 1–2 | Manchester City (1) | West Bromwich |
| 20:00 BST | Yacob 72' | Report | Sané 3', 77' | Stadium: The Hawthorns; Attendance: 14,953; Referee: Mike Jones |

Note: The numbers in parentheses are the tier for the team during the 2017–18 season.

== Fourth round ==
=== Entry ===
A total of 16 clubs played in the fourth round, all winners from the third round. The draw for the fourth round was held on 20 September 2017.

=== Matches ===
The fourth round draw was made as follows:

| 24 October 2017 | Arsenal (1) | 2–1 (a.e.t.) | Norwich City (2) | Holloway, London |
| 19:45 BST | Nketiah 85', 96' | Report | Murphy 34' | Stadium: Emirates Stadium; Attendance: 58,444; Referee: Andrew Madley |

| 24 October 2017 | Bournemouth (1) | 3–1 | Middlesbrough (2) | Bournemouth |
| 19:45 BST | Simpson 49'; Wilson 75' (pen.); Afobe 83' | Report | Tavernier 56' | Stadium: Dean Court; Attendance: 10,254; Referee: Simon Hooper |

| 24 October 2017 | Bristol City (2) | 4–1 | Crystal Palace (1) | Bristol |
| 19:45 BST | Taylor 34'; Đurić 39'; Bryan 60'; O'Dowda 66' | Report | Sako 21' | Stadium: Ashton Gate Stadium; Attendance: 21,901; Referee: Tim Robinson |

| 24 October 2017 | Leicester City (1) | 3–1 | Leeds United (2) | Leicester |
| 19:45 BST | Iheanacho 30'; Slimani 71'; Mahrez 88' | Report | Hernández 26' | Stadium: King Power Stadium; Attendance: 31,516; Referee: Lee Probert |

| 24 October 2017 | Manchester City (1) | 0–0 (a.e.t.) (4–1 p) | Wolverhampton Wanderers (2) | Manchester |
| 20:00 BST | | Report | | Stadium: Etihad Stadium; Attendance: 50,755; Referee: Kevin Friend |
| | Penalties |
| | De Bruyne (penalty scored); Touré (penalty scored); Sané (penalty scored); Agüero (penalty scored) | | (penalty scored) Bonatini; (penalty missed) N'Diaye; (penalty missed) Coady |

| 24 October 2017 | Swansea City (1) | 0–2 | Manchester United (1) | Swansea |
| 19:45 BST | | Report | Lingard 21', 59' | Stadium: Liberty Stadium; Attendance: 20,083; Referee: Bobby Madley |

| 25 October 2017 | Chelsea (1) | 2–1 | Everton (1) | Fulham, London |
| 19:45 BST | Rüdiger 26'; Willian 90+2' | Report | Calvert-Lewin 90+4' | Stadium: Stamford Bridge; Attendance: 40,655; Referee: Neil Swarbrick |

| 25 October 2017 | Tottenham Hotspur (1) | 2–3 | West Ham United (1) | Wembley, London |
| 20:00 BST | Sissoko 6'; Alli 37' | Report | Ayew 55', 60'; Ogbonna 70' | Stadium: Wembley Stadium; Attendance: 36,168; Referee: Mike Dean |

== Quarter-finals ==
=== Entry ===
A total of eight clubs played in the quarter-finals, all winners from the fourth round. The fifth round draw was held on 26 October 2017.

=== Matches ===
| 19 December 2017 | Arsenal (1) | 1–0 | West Ham United (1) | Holloway, London |
| 19:45 GMT | Welbeck 42' | Report | | Stadium: Emirates Stadium; Attendance: 44,741; Referee: Kevin Friend |

| 19 December 2017 | Leicester City (1) | 1–1 (a.e.t.) (3–4 p) | Manchester City (1) | Leicester |
| 19:45 GMT | Vardy 90+7' (pen.) | Report | B. Silva 26' | Stadium: King Power Stadium; Attendance: 31,562; Referee: Bobby Madley |
| | Penalties |
| | Fuchs (penalty scored); Maguire (penalty scored); Iborra (penalty scored); Vardy (penalty missed); Mahrez (penalty missed) | | (penalty scored) Gündoğan; (penalty scored) Touré; (penalty scored) Nmecha; (penalty scored) Gabriel Jesus |

| 20 December 2017 | Bristol City (2) | 2–1 | Manchester United (1) | Bristol |
| 20:00 GMT | Bryan 51'; Smith 90+3' | Report | Ibrahimović 58' | Stadium: Ashton Gate; Attendance: 26,088; Referee: Mike Dean |

| 20 December 2017 | Chelsea (1) | 2–1 | Bournemouth (1) | Fulham, London |
| 19:45 GMT | Willian 13'; Morata 90+1' | Report | Gosling 90' | Stadium: Stamford Bridge; Attendance: 41,168; Referee: Lee Mason |

== Semi-finals ==
=== Entry ===
A total of four clubs played in the semi-finals, all winners of the quarter-finals. There was no seeding in this round and the draw was held on 20 December at Ashton Gate immediately after Bristol City knocked out defending champions Manchester United in the 5th round.

=== Matches ===
The semi-finals were played over two legs, with each team playing one leg at home. The team that scored the most goals on aggregate over the two legs advanced to the final. If the aggregate score was level after 90 minutes in the second leg of a semi-final two 15-minute periods of extra time were played each way. If the aggregate score in a semi-final was still level at the end of extra time the tie was decided by the away goals rule, i.e. the team that scored most goals away from home over the two legs advanced. If a semi-final tie was still level, the result was determined by a penalty shoot-out.

The lowest ranked side to reach this stage of the competition was Championship club Bristol City.

==== First leg ====
| 9 January 2018 | Manchester City (1) | 2–1 | Bristol City (2) | Manchester |
| 19:45 GMT | De Bruyne 55'; Agüero 90+2' | Report | Reid 44' (pen.) | Stadium: Etihad Stadium; Attendance: 43,426; Referee: Anthony Taylor |

| 10 January 2018 | Chelsea (1) | 0–0 | Arsenal (1) | Fulham, London |
| 20:00 GMT | | Report | | Stadium: Stamford Bridge; Attendance: 40,097; Referee: Martin Atkinson |

==== Second leg ====
| 23 January 2018 | Bristol City (2) | 2–3 (3–5 agg.) | Manchester City (1) | Bristol |
| 19:45 GMT | Pack 64'; Flint 90+4' | Report | Sané 43'; Agüero 49'; De Bruyne 90+6' | Stadium: Ashton Gate; Attendance: 26,003; Referee: Graham Scott |

| 24 January 2018 | Arsenal (1) | 2–1 (2–1 agg.) | Chelsea (1) | Holloway, London |
| 20:00 GMT | Rüdiger 12' (o.g.); Xhaka 60' | Report | Hazard 7' | Stadium: Emirates Stadium; Attendance: 58,964; Referee: Michael Oliver |

== Final ==
The final was played on 25 February 2018 at Wembley Stadium.

25 February 2018
16:30 GMT

| Arsenal | 0–3 | Manchester City |
|---|---|---|
| | Report | Agüero 18'; Kompany 58'; D. Silva 65' |

Wembley Stadium, London
Attendance: 85,671
Referee: Craig Pawson

== Controversies regarding draws ==
There were a number of errors in the draw for the first round. Many fans experienced problems with the sound on the live stream from Thailand, and had to rely on the graphics. However, these contained a number of errors: Charlton Athletic were shown to be drawn in two ties, while a number of other teams including AFC Wimbledon, Brentford, Swindon Town, Norwich City, Forest Green Rovers, Wolverhampton Wanderers and Yeovil Town were all shown to have been given wrong draws. The English Football League later issued a statement apologising for the errors that had been made and stating that the draw had not been compromised with all clubs receiving confirmation of their ties.

Confusion also arose over the televised portion of the second round draw, in which four second round matches were announced with the incorrect location. The cup attracted even further criticism for its draws when it was announced that the third round draw would take place in Beijing at 11:15 China Standard Time (04:15 British Summer Time).

Further errors continued for the draw of the fifth round. This was due to technical problems at Twitter, which led to the draw being delayed for over an hour. The draw finally appeared in a pre-recorded video almost two hours late.

== Top goalscorers ==
| Rank | Player | Club | Goals |
|---|---|---|---|
| 1 | (England) Josh Murphy | Norwich City | 4 |
| 1 | (Spain) Samuel Sáiz | Leeds United | 4 |
| 1 | (Algeria) Islam Slimani | Leicester City | 4 |
| 4 | (Scotland) Ché Adams | Birmingham City | 3 |
| 4 | (Ghana) André Ayew | West Ham United | 3 |
| 4 | (Belgium) Michy Batshuayi | Chelsea | 3 |
| 4 | (Wales) Tom Bradshaw | Barnsley | 3 |
| 4 | (Scotland) Jason Cummings | Nottingham Forest | 3 |
| 4 | (Republic of Ireland) Scott Hogan | Aston Villa | 3 |
| 4 | (England) Jesse Lingard | Manchester United | 3 |
| 4 | (Jamaica) Kemar Roofe | Leeds United | 3 |
| 4 | (Germany) Leroy Sané | Manchester City | 3 |
