= 2017–18 Bristol City F.C. season =

Bristol City
2017–18 season
- Owner: Steve Lansdown
- Chairman: Keith Dawe
- Head Coach: Lee Johnson
- Stadium: Ashton Gate
- Championship: 11th
- FA Cup: Third round
- EFL Cup: Semi-final
- Highest home attendance: 26,088 vs. Manchester United (20 December 2017)
- Lowest home attendance: 17,203 vs. Bolton (26 September 2017)
- Average home league attendance: 20,952
Home colours	Away colours

The 2017–18 season was Bristol City's 120th season as a professional football club and their third consecutive season back in the Championship. Along with competing in the Championship, the club also participated in the FA Cup and EFL Cup, reaching the semi-finals of the latter competition. The season covered the period from 1 July 2017 to 30 June 2018.

== Month by month review ==
=== June ===
On 27 June, Bristol City agreed to sign right-back Eros Pisano on a two-year deal, with it being officially confirmed on 1 July when his contract with Hellas Verona expired. On 28 June, City broke their transfer record to sign striker Famara Diédhiou from Angers for a £5.3 million transfer fee.

=== July ===
On 7 July, Aaron Wilbraham signed a one-year contract with the club. On 13 July, attacking midfielder Lee Tomlin transferred to Cardiff City for an undisclosed fee. On 28 July, defender Nathan Baker, having previously spent the 2015–16 season on loan from Aston Villa, signed for City on a four-year deal for an undisclosed fee.

=== December ===
After beating three other Premier League sides, Bristol City were drawn against holders Manchester United in the quarter-finals of the EFL Cup. The game was played at Ashton Gate on 20 December and marked the first time City and United had met competitively since 1980, when City were last in the top flight. City took the lead through a thunderous Joe Bryan strike just after the second half began. Zlatan Ibrahimović equalised only seven minutes later. City sealed a dramatic and famous win as Korey Smith beat goalkeeper Sergio Romero with a 93rd-minute strike to make it 2–1 to the Robins. At the final whistle, fans invaded the pitch and lifted City players onto their shoulders.

After the match, City manager Lee Johnson said the result was "a historic occasion" and Smith's winner would "live in the memory for many generations". In defeating United, Bristol City became only the second side from a lower division to eliminate four top-flight teams in one League Cup campaign, after Sheffield Wednesday in 1990-91. City were drawn against United's city rivals Manchester City in the semi-finals of the competition, with the first leg at the Etihad Stadium.

On 26 December, Bristol City finished the day second in the Championship table as they defeated Reading 2–0 at home. Jamie Paterson scored the first, before Lloyd Kelly's first goal for City in stoppage time sealed the win. On 28 December, Bristol City lost at home to Wolverhampton Wanderers.

=== January ===
On 9 January, Bristol City travelled to the Premier League leaders to take on Manchester City in the semi-final first leg of the EFL Cup. The 7,680 Bristol City fans who arrived set a record for the most away fans in the Etihad Stadium's history. Manchester City were overwhelming favourites, unbeaten in the Premier League and having won 20 of their 22 matches so far. Bristol City played well and took a shock lead after Bobby Reid won and scored a penalty just before half-time. Kevin De Bruyne scored ten minutes into the second half and Bristol City looked to have secured a memorable draw before substitute Sergio Agüero scored with a 92nd-minute header to seal a 2–1 win.

The return leg was another entertaining affair at a sold out and noisy Ashton Gate, although Manchester City were comfortable for the most part. Leroy Sané scored just before half-time and Agüero scored just after to give Manchester City a 4–1 aggregate lead. Marlon Pack reduced the deficit before Aden Flint scored in injury time to give Bristol City hope. De Bruyne scored shortly after to kill the game, make it 3–2 on the night and 5–3 on aggregate.

After the game, Lee Johnson said Bristol City were a "Premier League club in training." Manchester City manager Pep Guardiola praised Bristol City and Lee Johnson after the two-legged affair: "It was a nice game, beautiful game, and all my credit to Bristol City. Big congratulations. He [Johnson] came here to try to play. They arrived, they created chances".

=== April ===
After a goalless draw against Nottingham Forest, Bristol City could no longer mathematically reach the playoffs, ending their chances of promotion.

A 3–2 home loss to fellow mid-table side Sheffield United on the last day of the season saw City eventually finish 11th. While this was disappointing after being 2nd on Boxing Day, this was the club's highest finish for eight years since 2009-10, when Lee Johnson was playing for the club and his father, Gary Johnson, was manager.

== Transfers ==
=== In ===
Date	Name	From	Fee	Ref
1 July 2017	Famara Diédhiou	Angers	£5,300,000	
1 July 2017	Eros Pisano	Hellas Verona	Free	
28 July 2017	Nathan Baker	Aston Villa	Undisclosed	
8 August 2017	Niclas Eliasson	IFK Norrköping	£1,800,000	
31 August 2017	Luke Steele	Panathinaikos	Free	
31 August 2017	Tyreeq Bakinson	Luton Town	Undisclosed	
31 August 2017	Rory Holden	Derry City	Undisclosed	
20 September 2017	Antoine Semenyo	SGS	Free	
5 January 2018	Liam Walsh	Everton	Undisclosed	

=== Out ===
Date	Name	To	Fee	Ref
30 June 2017	Mark Little	Bolton Wanderers	Released	
13 July 2017	Lee Tomlin	Cardiff City	Undisclosed (~ £2,900,000)	
3 August 2017	Aaron Wilbraham	Bolton Wanderers	Undisclosed	
31 January 2018	Diego De Girolamo	Unattached	Contract terminated by mutual consent	
31 January 2018	Ivan Lučić	Unattached	Contract terminated by mutual consent	

=== Loan in ===
Date	Name	From	End date	Ref
17 August 2017	Cauley Woodrow	Fulham	6 May 2018	
28 August 2017	Jonathan Leko	West Bromwich Albion	2 January 2018	
12 January 2018	Ryan Kent	Liverpool	6 May 2018	
25 January 2018	Loïs Diony	Saint-Étienne	30 June 2018	

=== Loan out ===
Date	Name	To	End date	Ref
28 July 2017	Jake Andrews	Chippenham Town	28 September 2017	
28 July 2017	Aden Baldwin	Weston-super-Mare	28 September 2017	
28 July 2017	Ashley Harper	Weston-super-Mare	29 April 2018	
28 July 2017	Connor Lemonheigh-Evans	Bath City	28 September 2017	
28 July 2017	Shawn McCoulsky	Newport County	6 May 2018	
5 August 2017	Jonny Smith	Solihull Moors	29 April 2018	
10 August 2017	Gustav Engvall	Djurgårdens IF	6 November 2017	
11 August 2017	Cameron Pring	Merthyr Town	11 October 2017	
25 August 2017	Joe Wollacott	Bath City	24 October 2017	
30 August 2017	Diego De Girolamo	Chesterfield	31 January 2018	
30 August 2017	Freddie Hinds	Cheltenham Town	3 January 2018	
30 August 2017	Taylor Moore	Cheltenham Town	6 May 2018	
30 August 2017	Joe Morrell	Cheltenham Town	6 May 2018	
31 August 2017	George Dowling	Torquay United	29 April 2018	
31 August 2017	Scott Golbourne	Milton Keynes Dons	14 January 2018	
28 September 2017	Harvey Smith	Weston-super-Mare	23 November 2017	
19 October 2017	Cameron Pring	Aldershot Town	16 November 2017	
20 October 2017	Cameron Allen	Mangotsfield United	6 January 2018	
24 October 2017	Opi Edwards	Bath City	19 December 2017	
24 October 2017	James Morton	Chippenham Town	1 December 2017	
24 October 2017	Alhaji Sesay	Paulton Rovers	23 November 2017	
16 November 2017	Cameron Pring	Hereford	29 April 2017	
23 November 2017	Max O'Leary	Solihull Moors	1 January 2018	
1 December 2017	James Morton	Bath City	13 January 2018	
1 December 2017	Lochlan Robertson	Cribbs	1 February 2018	
8 December 2017	Joe Wollacott	Woking	8 January 2018	
5 January 2018	Max O'Leary	Solihull Moors	29 April 2018	
18 January 2018	Zak Vyner	Plymouth Argyle	6 May 2018	
19 January 2018	Opi Edwards	Solihull Moors	29 April 2018	
20 January 2018	Antoine Semenyo	Bath City	20 February 2018	
30 January 2018	Kel Akpobire	Guernsey	28 February 2018	
31 January 2018	Jake Andrews	Cheltenham Town	6 May 2018	
31 January 2018	Scott Golbourne	Milton Keynes Dons	6 May 2018	
31 January 2018	Connor Lemonheigh-Evans	Torquay United	29 April 2018	
31 January 2018	Tin Plavotic	Barnet	6 May 2018	

== Pre-season ==
=== Friendlies ===
Pre-season match details
Date	Opponents	Venue	Result	Score F–A	Scorers	Attendance	Ref
8 July 2017	Guernsey	A	W	1–0	Reid	933	
9 July 2017	Bristol Manor Farm	A	W	11–0	Hinds, Pisano, Reid, Brownhill, Morrell, O'Dowda (2), De Girolamo (2), McCoulsky (2)	1,400	
11 July 2017	Bath City	A	W	3–0	Paterson (pen), Reid, Bryan	963	
12 July 2017	Torquay United	A	L	0–2		1,258	
15 July 2017	Yeovil Town	A	W	3–1	Reid (2), Magnússon	2,636	
22 July 2017	Atlético Unión de Güímar	A	W	6–0	Pisano, Diédhiou, Reid (2), Wright, Hinds	—	
25 July 2017	Cheltenham Town	A	W	3–0	Engvall (2), Reid	1,883	
28 July 2017	FC Twente	H	W	2–0	Pack, Bryan	5,330	

== Competitions ==
=== Championship ===
Championship match details
Date	League position	Opponents	Venue	Result	Score F–A	Scorers	Attendance	Ref
5 August 2017	1st	Barnsley	H	W	3–1	Reid (2), Diédhiou	18,742	
12 August 2017	9th	Birmingham City	A	L	1–2	Reid	21,269	
15 August 2017	10th	Brentford	A	D	2–2	Brownhill, Reid	9,811	
19 August 2017	11th	Millwall	H	D	0–0		18,230	
25 August 2017	10th	Aston Villa	H	D	1–1	Paterson	21,542	
9 September 2017	9th	Reading	A	W	1–0	Flint	18,650	
12 September 2017	12th	Wolverhampton Wanderers	A	D	3–3	Flint, Diédhiou (pen), Reid	23,045	
16 September 2017	8th	Derby County	H	W	4–1	Woodrow, Reid (pen), Paterson, Diédhiou	19,473	
23 September 2017	8th	Norwich City	A	D	0–0		25,715	
26 September 2017	7th	Bolton Wanderers	H	W	2–0	Diédhiou, Flint	17,203	
30 September 2017	5th	Ipswich Town	A	W	3–1	Brownhill, Diédhiou, Reid	15,256	
13 October 2017	3rd	Burton Albion	H	D	0–0		18,212	
21 October 2017	6th	Leeds United	H	L	0–3		24,435	
28 October 2017	4th	Sunderland	A	W	2–1	Reid, Đurić	27,317	
31 October 2017	4th	Fulham	A	W	2–0	Reid, Smith	17,634	
4 November 2017	4th	Cardiff City	H	W	2–1	O'Dowda, Flint	21,692	
18 November 2017	4th	Sheffield Wednesday	A	D	0–0		25,916	
22 November 2017	5th	Preston North End	H	L	1–2	Woodrow	17,355	
25 November 2017	5th	Hull City	A	W	3–2	Flint, Reid, Brownhill	14,762	
3 December 2017	3rd	Middlesbrough	H	W	2–1	Bryan, Paterson	18,752	
8 December 2017	3rd	Sheffield United	A	W	2–1	Paterson, Flint	24,409	
16 December 2017	3rd	Nottingham Forest	H	W	2–1	Pack, Bryan	20,128	
23 December 2017	4th	Queens Park Rangers	A	D	1–1	Reid (pen)	13,683	
26 December 2017	2nd	Reading	H	W	2–0	Paterson, Kelly	23,116	
30 December 2017	3rd	Wolverhampton Wanderers	H	L	1–2	Reid	25,540	
1 January 2018	4th	Aston Villa	A	L	0–5		32,604	
13 January 2018	5th	Norwich City	H	L	0–1		21,282	
19 January 2018	4th	Derby County	A	D	0–0		26,525	
27 January 2018	4th	Queens Park Rangers	H	W	2–0	Diédhiou, Bryan	21,492	
2 February 2018	5th	Bolton Wanderers	A	L	0–1		14,172	
10 February 2018	6th	Sunderland	H	D	3–3	Flint, Diédhiou (2)	22,580	
18 February 2018	6th	Leeds United	A	D	2-2	Diédhiou, Reid	28,004	
21 February 2018	6th	Fulham	H	D	1–1	Reid	21,236	
25 February 2018	6th	Cardiff City	A	L	0–1		21,018	
3 March 2018	6th	Sheffield Wednesday	H	W	4–0	Reid (3), Brownhill	22,022	
6 March 2018	7th	Preston North End	A	L	1–2	Diédhiou	11,264	
10 March 2018	7th	Burton Albion	A	D	0–0		4,575	
17 March 2018	7th	Ipswich Town	H	W	1–0	Đurić	21,509	
30 March 2018	7th	Barnsley	A	D	2–2	Diédhiou, Brownhill	12,236	
2 April 2018	7th	Brentford	H	L	0–1		22,049	
7 April 2018	8th	Millwall	A	L	0–2		16,081	
10 April 2018	8th	Birmingham City	H	W	3–1	Pack, Reid, Taylor	20,288	
14 April 2018	11th	Middlesbrough	A	L	1–2	Đurić	24,812	
21 April 2018	10th	Hull City	H	D	5–5	Pack, Diédhiou (2), Reid, Bryan	21,136	
28 April 2018	10th	Nottingham Forest	A	D	0–0		24,722	
6 May 2018	11th	Sheffield United	H	L	2–3	Flint, Bryan	23,902	

==== League table ====
Pos	Team	Pld	W	D	L	GF	GA	GD	Pts
9	Brentford	46	18	15	13	62	52	+10	69
10	Sheffield United	46	20	9	17	62	55	+7	69
11	Bristol City	46	17	16	13	67	58	+9	67
12	Ipswich Town	46	17	9	20	57	60	−3	60
13	Leeds United	46	17	9	20	59	64	−5	60

Source: English Football League
Rules for classification: 1) Points; 2) Goal difference; 3) Number of goals scored

=== FA Cup ===
FA Cup match details
Round	Date	Opponents	Venue	Result	Score F–A	Scorers	Attendance	Ref
Third round	6 January 2018	Watford	A	L	0–3		13,269	

=== EFL Cup ===
EFL Cup match details
Round	Date	Opponents	Venue	Result	Score F–A	Scorers	Attendance	Ref
First round	8 August 2017	Plymouth Argyle	H	W	5–0	Hegeler, Baker, Smith, Hinds, Paterson	9,838	
Second round	22 August 2017	Watford	A	W	3–2	Hinds, Reid, Eliasson	9,003	
Third round	19 September 2017	Stoke City	H	W	2–0	Diédhiou, Taylor	13,826	
Fourth round	24 October 2017	Crystal Palace	H	W	4–1	Taylor, Đurić, Bryan, O'Dowda	21,901	
Quarter-finals	20 December 2017	Manchester United	H	W	2–1	Bryan, Smith	26,088	
Semi-final first leg	9 January 2018	Manchester City	A	L	1–2	Reid (pen)	43,426	
Semi-final second leg	23 January 2018	Manchester City	H	L	2–3	Pack, Flint	26,003	

== Squad statistics ==
Numbers in parentheses denote appearances as substitute.
Players with squad numbers struck through and marked † left the club during the playing season.
Players with names in italics and marked * were on loan from another club for the whole of their season with Bristol City.
Players listed with no appearances have been in the matchday squad but only as unused substitutes.
Key to positions: GK – Goalkeeper; DF – Defender; MF – Midfielder; FW – Forward

No.	Pos.	Nat.	Name	Apps	Goals	Apps	Goals	Apps	Goals	Apps	Goals	Yellow card	Red card
No.	Pos.	Nat.	Name	League		FA Cup		EFL Cup		Total		Discipline	
1	GK	ENG	Frank Fielding	43	0	0	0	3	0	44	0	1	1
2	DF	ITA	Eros Pisano	13 (3)	0	0	0	1	0	14 (3)	0	2	0
3	DF	ENG	Joe Bryan	42 (1)	5	0	0	4 (1)	2	46 (2)	7	12	0
4	DF	ENG	Aden Flint	38 (1)	8	1	0	6	1	45 (1)	9	7	1
5	DF	AUS	Bailey Wright	36	0	0	0	4	0	40	0	7	0
6	DF	ENG	Nathan Baker	34	0	0	0	3 (1)	1	37 (1)	1	7	1
7	MF	ENG	Korey Smith	44 (1)	1	1	0	4 (2)	2	49 (3)	3	5	0
8	MF	ENG	Josh Brownhill	41 (4)	5	0	0	6	0	47 (4)	5	8	0
9	FW	SEN	Famara Diédhiou	28 (4)	13	0	0	3 (1)	1	31 (5)	14	4	0
10	FW	ENG	Matty Taylor	4 (14)	1	1	0	2 (2)	2	7 (16)	3	1	1
11	MF	IRE	Callum O'Dowda	13 (11)	1	0	0	4	1	17 (11)	2	0	0
12	MF	ENG	Liam Walsh	3 (3)	0	0	0	1 (1)	0	4 (4)	0	0	0
13	DF	ENG	Scott Golbourne	0	0	0	0	0	0	0	0	0	0
14	MF	ENG	Bobby Reid	46	19	0	0	4 (2)	2	50 (2)	21	9	0
15	GK	ENG	Luke Steele	3 (2)	0	1	0	4	0	8 (2)	0	0	0
16	FW	SWE	Gustav Engvall	0 (2)	0	0 (1)	0	0	0	0 (3)	0	0	0
18	FW	ENG	Cauley Woodrow *	3 (11)	2	1	0	0	0	4 (11)	2	3	0
19	FW	SWE	Niclas Eliasson	3 (11)	0	1	0	2 (1)	1	6 (12)	1	0	0
20	MF	ENG	Jamie Paterson	34 (7)	5	0	0	3 (2)	1	37 (9)	6	3	0
21	MF	ENG	Marlon Pack	36 (6)	3	0 (1)	0	5	1	41 (7)	4	12	0
22	FW	BIH	Milan Đurić	4 (12)	3	0	0	0 (1)	1	4 (13)	4	2	0
23	DF	ISL	Hörður Björgvin Magnússon	15 (9)	0	1	0	7	0	23 (9)	0	0	0
24	GK	ENG	Max O'Leary	0	0	0	0	0	0	0	0	0	0
25	DF	ENG	Lloyd Kelly	7 (4)	1	1	0	1 (1)	0	9 (5)	1	0	0
26	DF	ENG	Zak Vyner	1	0	1	0	3	0	5	0	0	0
27	FW	CMR	Paul Garita	0	0	0	0	0	0	0	0	0	0
28	MF	ENG	Gary O'Neil	0 (4)	0	0	0	2	0	2 (4)	0	1	0
~~29~~ †	GK	AUT	Ivan Lučić	0	0	0	0	0	0	0	0	0	0
30	MF	ENG	Tyreeq Bakinson	0	0	0	0	0 (1)	0	0 (1)	0	0	0
31	MF	GER	Jens Hegeler	3 (1)	0	0	0	3	1	6 (1)	1	1	0
32	MF	WAL	Joe Morrell	0	0	0	0	0 (1)	0	0 (1)	0	0	0
33	FW	ENG	Freddie Hinds	0 (1)	0	0 (1)	0	2	2	2 (2)	2	0	0
34	MF	WAL	Connor Lemonheigh-Evans	0	0	1	0	0	0	1	0	0	0
35	MF	ENG	Jake Andrews	0	0	0	0	0	0	0	0	0	0
36	FW	NIR	Rory Holden	0	0	0	0	0	0	0	0	0	0
37	MF	ENG	Opi Edwards	0	0	1	0	0	0	1	0	0	0
38	GK	ENG	Joe Wollacott	0	0	0	0	0	0	0	0	0	0
39	FW	FRA	Loïs Diony *	1 (6)	0	0	0	0	0	1 (6)	0	0	0
40	MF	ENG	Ryan Kent *	6 (4)	0	0	0	0 (1)	0	6 (5)	0	1	0
42	FW	ENG	Antoine Semenyo	0 (1)	0	0	0	0	0	0 (1)	0	0	0
~~45~~ †	FW	ENG	Jonathan Leko *	5 (6)	0	0	0	0	0	5 (6)	0	1	0

Players not included in matchday squads
No.	Pos.	Nat.	Name
17	DF	ENG	Taylor Moore
