= Marlon Pack =

English footballer (born 1991)

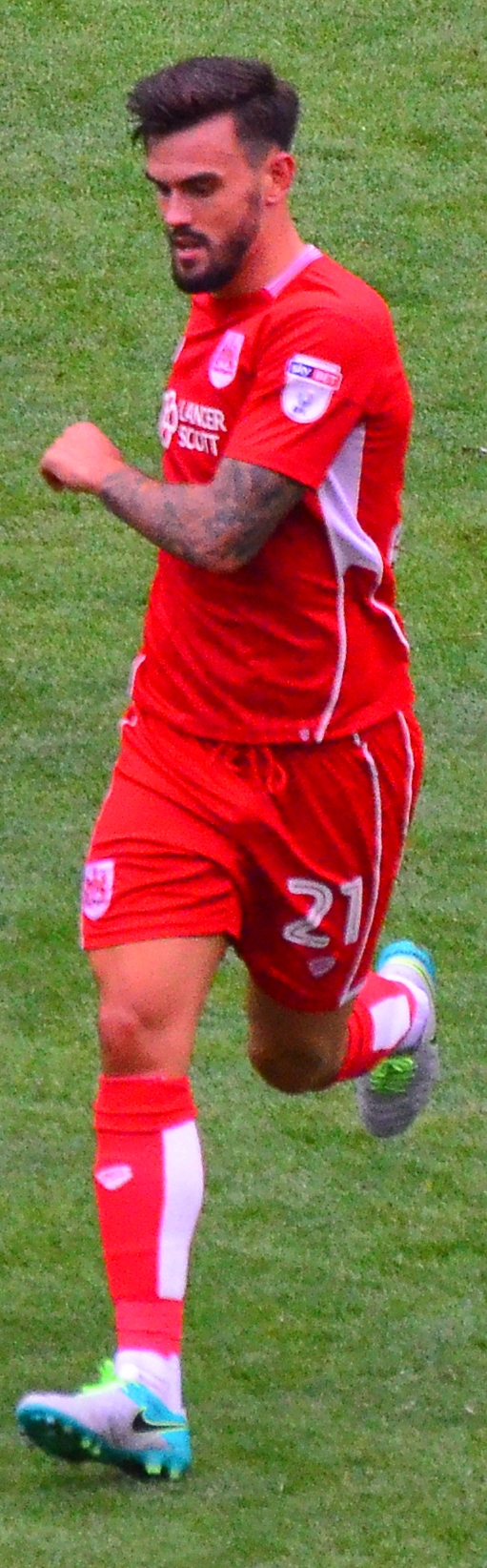
- Pack in 2016

Personal information
- Full name: Marlon Pack
- Date of birth: 25 March 1991 (age 35)
- Place of birth: Portsmouth, England
- Height: 6 ft 2 in (1.88 m)
- Position: Midfielder

Team information
- Current team: Portsmouth
- Number: 7

Youth career
- 2007–2009: Portsmouth

Senior career*
Years	Team	Apps	(Gls)
2009–2011	Portsmouth	1	(0)
2009	→ Wycombe Wanderers (loan)	8	(0)
2010	→ Dagenham & Redbridge (loan)	17	(1)
2010–2011	→ Cheltenham Town (loan)	38	(2)
2011–2013	Cheltenham Town	86	(12)
2013–2019	Bristol City	244	(11)
2019–2022	Cardiff City	100	(5)
2022–	Portsmouth	153	(10)
- * Club domestic league appearances and goals as of 22:02, 14 October 2026 (UTC)

Marlon Pack (born 25 March 1991) is an English professional footballer who plays as a midfielder for and captains EFL Championship club Portsmouth. He formerly played for Bristol City, Cardiff City and Cheltenham Town.

== Career ==
=== Portsmouth ===
Born in Portsmouth, Hampshire, Pack became a first year scholar in the 2007–08 season playing regularly for the academy and occasionally for the reserves. The following season he became a regular in the reserve team and remained a key player in the academy side. By the time he signed a one-year professional contract at the end of the 2008–09 season, he had played more than 50 games for Portsmouth's junior teams. He made his debut in the League Cup against Crystal Palace on 24 August 2010 as an extra time substitute, scoring in the subsequent penalty shoot out.

=== Wycombe Wanderers ===
On 31 August 2009, Pack joined Wycombe Wanderers of Football League One on a one-month youth loan. Pack made his debut in the Football League five days later as a second-half substitute in a narrow loss to Brighton & Hove Albion. He made nine appearances in all competitions for Wycombe, where he remained until 26 October when new manager Gary Waddock chose not to extend the loan further.

=== Dagenham & Redbridge ===
In January 2010, he went on loan to Dagenham & Redbridge. Marlon was scheduled to return to Portsmouth on 6 April 2010 as his maximum 94-day loan spell would have ended at the club. Furthermore, as the loan window had closed Dagenham were unable to renew the loan deal until the end of the Football League season. He scored his first goal for the Daggers in what turned out to be his final appearance for the team, a 3–1 defeat to Port Vale on 5 April 2010.

=== Cheltenham Town ===
Pack signed on a season-long loan for Cheltenham Town on 31 August 2010 making his debut on 4 September in a 3–1 away defeat to Barnet. He was then awarded the player of the month for his performances in November. On 28 December 2010, he scored his first goal for the club in a 4–0 win against Bradford City. Five days later he scored his second goal in a 2–1 victory against Southend United at Roots Hall. On 23 May 2011, he made the loan move permanent, signing from Portsmouth on a free transfer. He scored his first goal of the 2011–12 season on 27 August 2011 in a 3–1 win against Crawley Town. In December 2011 he scored three goals, including goals in back-to-back wins against Luton Town and Southend United, and in a 1–0 win against Rotherham United. He scored his fifth goal of the season in a 4–1 home win against Accrington Stanley on 14 April, before helping Cheltenham secure a play-off position by scoring in a 2–1 victory against Plymouth Argyle on 5 May. In the play-off semi finals Cheltenham faced Torquay United and after winning the home leg 2–0, they won the away leg 2–1 thanks to a late 25-yard free-kick scored by Pack to send them to the final at Wembley Stadium.

=== Bristol City ===
After a trial, Pack signed a two-year deal with League One club Bristol City on 2 August 2013. Although his Cheltenham contract had expired, a compensation fee, agreed at around £100,000, was payable because he was aged under 24. He was given the number 21 shirt. Pack made his Bristol City debut on the opening day of the season, as a second-half substitute in a 2–2 draw with Bradford City.

Pack scored his first goal for the club in a 3–1 win against Coventry City on 18 October 2014.

In May 2015 Pack signed a new two-year contract to remain at the club until the summer of 2017. This was followed by the option for a further year being taken up.

Pack featured heavily as Bristol City reached the semi-finals of the 2017–18 EFL Cup with wins over Premier League opponents Watford, Stoke City, Crystal Palace and Manchester United. Pack scored in the semi-final defeat against Premier League leaders Manchester City. He signed a new three-year contract in July 2018.

Pack departed Bristol City with 283 club appearances, 12 goals and 24 assists. He was replaced as captain by Josh Brownhill.

=== Cardiff City ===
Pack joined Cardiff on 8 August 2019 for an undisclosed fee on a three-year contract, ending his Bristol City captaincy in the process. He made his debut for the side two days later in a 2–1 victory over Luton Town. In August 2019 he suffered a leg injury during a game at Reading, he made his return on 28 September in a 2–2 draw with Hull City. Pack's first goal in a Cardiff shirt came in the following game in a 3–0 win against Queens Park Rangers. On 10 June 2022, Cardiff announced Pack would leave the club when his contract expired on 30 June.

=== Portsmouth ===
On 22 June 2022, Pack returned to his hometown club Portsmouth on a two-year deal having begun his professional career with the League One club. Following the departure of Clark Robertson, Pack was appointed Portsmouth captain ahead of the 2023–24 season. At the EFL Awards, Pack was named in the League One Team of the Season. He was named as Portsmouth's Player of the Season for 2023–24 by The News/Sports Mail following the club's promotion as champions.

On 8 May 2026, the club announced Pack had signed a new one-year contract.

== Career statistics ==
As of match played 14 October 2026

Appearances and goals by club, season and competition
Club	Season	League			FA Cup		League Cup		Other		Total	
Club	Season	Division	Apps	Goals	Apps	Goals	Apps	Goals	Apps	Goals	Apps	Goals
Portsmouth	2009–10	Premier League	0	0	0	0	0	0	—		0	0
Portsmouth	2010–11	Championship	1	0	0	0	1	0	—		2	0
Portsmouth	Total		1	0	0	0	1	0	—		2	0
Wycombe Wanderers (loan)	2009–10	League One	8	0	—		—		1 (Note: Appearances in Football League Trophy)	0	9	0
Dagenham & Redbridge (loan)	2009–10	League Two	17	1	—		—		—		17	1
Cheltenham Town (loan)	2010–11	League Two	38	2	2	0	—		1	0	41	2
Cheltenham Town	2011–12	League Two	43	5	3	1	1	0	6 (Note: Three appearances and one goal in League Two play-offs, three in Football League Trophy)	1	53	7
Cheltenham Town	2012–13	League Two	43	7	4	0	1	0	3 (Note: Two appearances in League Two play-offs, one in Football League Trophy)	0	51	7
Cheltenham Town	Total		124	14	9	1	2	0	10	1	145	16
Bristol City	2013–14	League One	43	0	4	0	3	0	2	0	52	0
Bristol City	2014–15	League One	34	3	5	0	1	0	6	0	46	3
Bristol City	2015–16	Championship	45	1	2	0	1	0	—		48	1
Bristol City	2016–17	Championship	33	2	2	0	4	0	—		39	2
Bristol City	2017–18	Championship	42	3	1	0	5	1	—		48	4
Bristol City	2018–19	Championship	46	2	2	0	0	0	—		48	2
Bristol City	2019–20	Championship	1	0	0	0	0	0	—		1	0
Bristol City	Total		244	11	16	0	14	1	8	0	282	12
Cardiff City	2019–20	Championship	37	2	3	0	0	0	2 (Note: Appearances in Championship play-offs)	0	42	2
Cardiff City	2020–21	Championship	39	2	1	0	1	0	—		41	2
Cardiff City	2021–22	Championship	24	1	2	0	0	0	—		26	1
Cardiff City	Total		100	5	6	0	1	0	2	0	109	5
Portsmouth	2022–23	League One	32	5	1	0	2	0	2 (Note: Appearances in EFL Trophy)	0	37	5
Portsmouth	2023–24	League One	38	3	0	0	1	0	0	0	39	3
Portsmouth	2024–25	Championship	41	0	0	0	0	0	0	0	41	0
Portsmouth	2025–26	Championship	34	2	1	0	0	0	0	0	35	2
Portsmouth	2026–27	Championship	8	0	0	0	0	0	0	0	8	0
Portsmouth	Total		153	10	2	0	3	0	2	0	160	10
Career total			647	41	33	1	21	1	23	1	724	44

== Honours ==
Bristol City

- Football League One: 2014–15
- Football League Trophy: 2014–15

Portsmouth

- EFL League One: 2023–24

Individual

- PFA Team of the Year: 2011–12 League Two, 2012–13 League Two, 2023–24 League One
- EFL League One Team of the Season: 2023–24
- Portsmouth Player of the Season: 2023–24
