= Bobby De Cordova-Reid =

Jamaican footballer (born 1993)

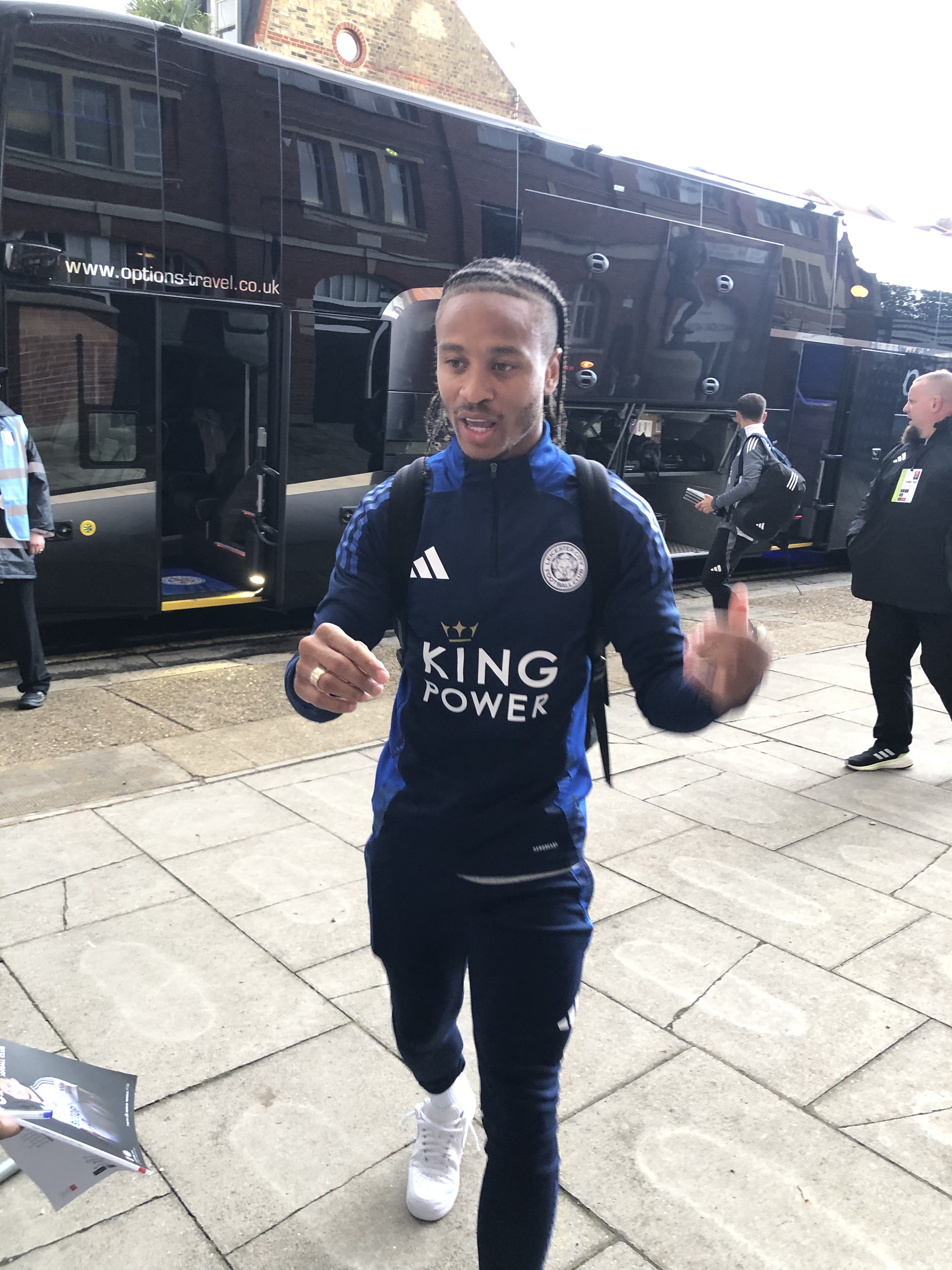
- De Cordova-Reid with Leicester City in 2024

Personal information
- Full name: Bobby Armani De Cordova-Reid
- Date of birth: 2 February 1993 (age 33)
- Place of birth: Bristol, England
- Height: 5 ft 7 in (1.70 m)
- Positions: Forward; left winger

Team information
- Current team: Leicester City
- Number: 14

Youth career
- 2002–2011: Bristol City

Senior career*
| Years | Team | Apps | (Gls) |
| 2011–2018 | Bristol City | 135 | (26) |
| 2011 | → Cheltenham Town (loan) | 1 | (0) |
| 2013 | → Oldham Athletic (loan) | 7 | (0) |
| 2014 | → Plymouth Argyle (loan) | 7 | (0) |
| 2014–2015 | → Plymouth Argyle (loan) | 6 | (2) |
| 2015 | → Plymouth Argyle (loan) | 20 | (1) |
| 2018–2020 | Cardiff City | 28 | (5) |
| 2019–2020 | → Fulham (loan) | 24 | (4) |
| 2020–2024 | Fulham | 159 | (25) |
| 2024– | Leicester City | 70 | (7) |

International career^{‡}
| 2019– | Jamaica | 45 | (7) |
Medal record
Men's football
Representing Jamaica
CONCACAF Nations League
| Bronze medal – third place | 2024 United States | Team |
- * Club domestic league appearances and goals as of 21:12, 10 November 2026 (UTC) ‡ National team caps and goals as of 09:33, 1 April 2026 (UTC)

Bobby Armani De Cordova-Reid (né Reid; born 2 February 1993) is a professional footballer who plays as a forward or left winger for EFL League One club Leicester City. Born in England, he represents Jamaica at international level.

He began his professional career with Bristol City in the Championship and League One, and also had loans to Cheltenham Town, Oldham Athletic and Plymouth Argyle. In 2018, he transferred to Cardiff City, where he played his first season in the Premier League. He then played for Fulham for five seasons, winning the Championship in 2021–22.

De Cordova-Reid made his international debut for Jamaica in 2019. He was selected for three CONCACAF Gold Cups, reaching the semi-finals in 2023, and the 2024 Copa América.

== Early and personal life ==
De Cordova-Reid was born in Bristol, England, and is of Jamaican descent. He grew up in the inner-city neighbourhood of Easton. De Cordova-Reid is a cousin to Anthony McNamee, a fellow footballer whose clubs include Watford and Norwich City. In October 2018 he changed his name from Bobby Reid to Bobby De Cordova-Reid. 'De Cordova' is his mother's name and Reid added it because he "wanted to represent her after the hard work she's done for me".

His elder sister is Labour Member of Parliament Marsha de Cordova.

== Club career ==
=== Bristol City ===
After playing for their youth team, De Cordova-Reid was offered a professional contract by Bristol City on 4 April 2011, and was called up to the first team for the last game of the 2010–11 season, where he made his senior debut. In November 2011, De Cordova-Reid signed on loan for Cheltenham Town until the end of the year. On 25 March 2013, De Cordova-Reid signed on loan for Oldham Athletic until the end of the 2012–13 season.

He signed a one-month loan deal with Plymouth Argyle in September 2014. The loan deal was then extended for a second month, before he was recalled early following injury problems back at Bristol City. After making one appearance for his parent club, he returned on loan to Plymouth later that month. He returned to Plymouth for a third loan spell in January 2015. De Cordova-Reid played 27 times in the Football League Championship the following season, scoring two goals as City finished 18th, avoiding relegation straight back to League One.

De Cordova-Reid featured as Bristol City reached the semi-finals of the 2017–18 EFL Cup with wins over Premier League opponents Watford, Stoke City, Crystal Palace and Manchester United. De Cordova-Reid scored in the semi-final defeat against Premier League leaders Manchester City. With 19 goals, he was joint third top scorer of the Championship season. He was selected in the PFA Team of the Year.

=== Cardiff City ===
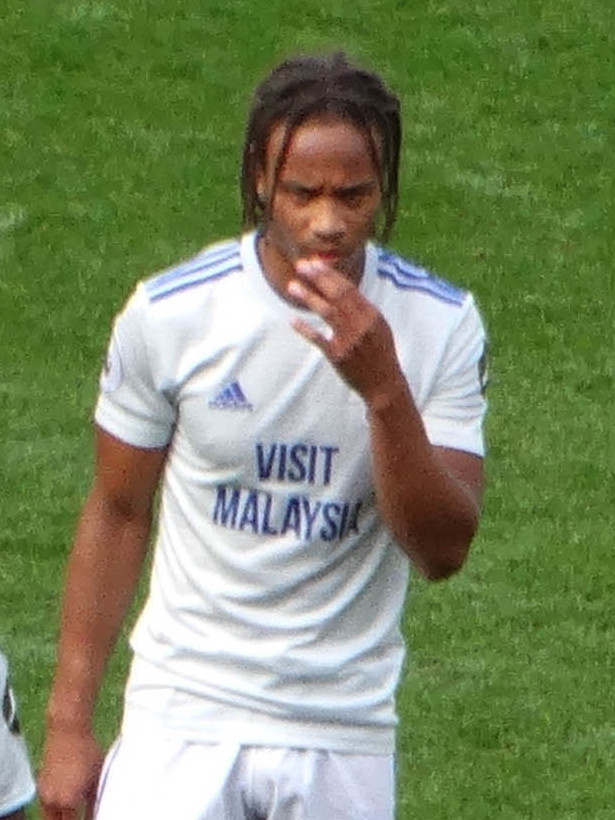
De Cordova-Reid with Cardiff City in 2018

On 28 June 2018, De Cordova-Reid signed for Premier League newcomers, Cardiff City, on a four-year deal for a reported fee of £10 million. He described the 2017–18 season as "crazy". He made his debut for the club on the opening day of the 2018–19 season during a 2–0 defeat to AFC Bournemouth. De Cordova-Reid scored his first goal in a Cardiff shirt in a 4–2 win over Fulham on 20 October. On 2 February 2019, on his 26th birthday and also the first home game since the disappearance of new signing Emiliano Sala, De Cordova-Reid scored both goals of a win over AFC Bournemouth.

=== Fulham ===
In August 2019, De Cordova-Reid moved to Fulham on loan. De Cordova-Reid made his debut in a 2–0 win against Blackburn Rovers in the EFL Championship on 10 August 2019. He scored his first goal for the club in a 3–0 win against Derby County on 26 November 2019. The deal became permanent on 24 January 2020, with De Cordova-Reid signing a three-and-a-half-year contract.

De Cordova-Reid finished the 2020–21 season as Fulham's top scorer but the club were relegated from the Premier League after a single season in the top-flight.

On 14 August 2021, he provided three assists in a 5–1 away win over Huddersfield Town. De Cordova-Reid and Fulham entered into discussions for a new contract at the end of the 2023–24 season.

=== Leicester City ===
On 6 July 2024, De Cordova-Reid signed for newly promoted Premier League club Leicester City on a three-year contract. On 19 August, he made his debut for the club in a 1–1 draw against Tottenham Hotspur in the league. His first goal came on 8 December, where he scored a stoppage time equaliser to draw 2–2 against Brighton.

== International career ==
In June 2019, De Cordova-Reid received an invitation to play for the Jamaica national side for the CONCACAF Gold Cup the following month. That August, he was officially called up for CONCACAF Nations League matches against Antigua and Barbuda and Guyana. He made his debut against the former on 6 September and scored in a 6–0 victory.

At the 2021 CONCACAF Gold Cup, De Cordova-Reid scored from a volley in a 2–0 opening win over Suriname. His goal was named Goal of the Tournament.

== Career statistics ==
=== Club ===
As of match played 10 November 2026

Appearances and goals by club, season and competition
| Club | Season | League | | | FA Cup | | League Cup | | Other | | Total | |
| Club | Season | Division | Apps | Goals | Apps | Goals | Apps | Goals | Apps | Goals | Apps | Goals |
|---|---|---|---|---|---|---|---|---|---|---|---|---|
| Bristol City | 2010–11 | Championship | 1 | 0 | 0 | 0 | 0 | 0 | — | | 1 | 0 |
| Bristol City | 2011–12 | Championship | 0 | 0 | — | | 0 | 0 | — | | 0 | 0 |
| Bristol City | 2012–13 | Championship | 4 | 1 | 1 | 0 | 0 | 0 | — | | 5 | 1 |
| Bristol City | 2013–14 | League One | 24 | 1 | 3 | 0 | 3 | 0 | 2 (Note: Appearances in Football League Trophy) | 0 | 32 | 1 |
| Bristol City | 2014–15 | League One | 2 | 0 | 0 | 0 | 1 | 0 | 0 | 0 | 3 | 0 |
| Bristol City | 2015–16 | Championship | 28 | 2 | 1 | 0 | 1 | 0 | — | | 30 | 2 |
| Bristol City | 2016–17 | Championship | 30 | 3 | 1 | 0 | 4 | 1 | — | | 35 | 4 |
| Bristol City | 2017–18 | Championship | 46 | 19 | 0 | 0 | 6 | 2 | — | | 52 | 21 |
| Bristol City | Total | | 135 | 26 | 6 | 0 | 15 | 3 | 2 | 0 | 158 | 29 |
| Cheltenham Town (loan) | 2011–12 | League Two | 1 | 0 | 0 | 0 | — | | — | | 1 | 0 |
| Oldham Athletic (loan) | 2012–13 | League One | 7 | 0 | — | | — | | — | | 7 | 0 |
| Plymouth Argyle (loan) | 2014–15 | League Two | 33 | 3 | — | | — | | 2 (Note: Appearances in League Two play-offs) | 0 | 35 | 3 |
| Cardiff City | 2018–19 | Premier League | 27 | 5 | 1 | 0 | 1 | 0 | — | | 29 | 5 |
| Cardiff City | 2019–20 | Championship | 1 | 0 | 0 | 0 | 0 | 0 | — | | 1 | 0 |
| Cardiff City | Total | | 28 | 5 | 1 | 0 | 1 | 0 | 0 | 0 | 30 | 5 |
| Fulham (loan) | 2019–20 | Championship | 24 | 4 | 0 | 0 | 1 | 0 | 0 | 0 | 25 | 4 |
| Fulham | 2019–20 | Championship | 17 | 2 | 1 | 0 | 0 | 0 | 3 (Note: Appearances in Championship play-offs) | 0 | 21 | 2 |
| Fulham | 2020–21 | Premier League | 33 | 5 | 2 | 1 | 2 | 1 | — | | 37 | 7 |
| Fulham | 2021–22 | Championship | 41 | 8 | 1 | 0 | 2 | 0 | — | | 44 | 8 |
| Fulham | 2022–23 | Premier League | 35 | 4 | 5 | 0 | 0 | 0 | — | | 40 | 4 |
| Fulham | 2023–24 | Premier League | 33 | 6 | 2 | 1 | 6 | 0 | — | | 41 | 7 |
| Fulham | Total | | 159 | 25 | 11 | 2 | 10 | 1 | 3 | 0 | 183 | 28 |
| Leicester City | 2024–25 | Premier League | 23 | 1 | 2 | 1 | 2 | 0 | — | | 27 | 2 |
| Leicester City | 2025–26 | Championship | 36 | 5 | 0 | 0 | 0 | 0 | – | | 36 | 5 |
| Leicester City | 2026–27 | League One | 11 | 1 | 1 | 0 | 2 | 0 | 3 | 1 | 17 | 2 |
| Leicester City | Total | | 70 | 7 | 3 | 1 | 4 | 0 | 3 | 1 | 80 | 9 |
| Career total | | | 457 | 70 | 21 | 3 | 31 | 4 | 10 | 1 | 519 | 78 |

=== International ===
As of match played 31 March 2026

Appearances and goals by national team and year
| National team | Year | Apps | Goals |
|---|---|---|---|
| Jamaica | 2019 | 4 | 1 |
| Jamaica | 2020 | 2 | 0 |
| Jamaica | 2021 | 8 | 1 |
| Jamaica | 2022 | 3 | 0 |
| Jamaica | 2023 | 10 | 4 |
| Jamaica | 2024 | 9 | 0 |
| Jamaica | 2025 | 7 | 1 |
| Jamaica | 2026 | 2 | 0 |
| Total | | 45 | 7 |

Scores and results list Jamaica's goal tally first, score column indicates score after each De Cordova-Reid goal.

List of international goals scored by Bobby De Cordova-Reid
| No. | Date | Venue | Opponent | Score | Result | Competition |
|---|---|---|---|---|---|---|
| 1 | 6 September 2019 | Montego Bay Sports Complex, Montego Bay, Jamaica | Antigua and Barbuda | 2–0 | 6–0 | 2019–20 CONCACAF Nations League B |
| 2 | 12 July 2021 | Exploria Stadium, Orlando, United States | Suriname | 2–0 | 2–0 | 2021 CONCACAF Gold Cup |
| 3 | 26 March 2023 | Estadio Azteca, Mexico City, Mexico | Mexico | 1–0 | 2–2 | 2022–23 CONCACAF Nations League A |
| 4 | 12 September 2023 | Independence Park, Kingston, Jamaica | Haiti | 2–2 | 2–2 | 2023–24 CONCACAF Nations League A |
| 5 | 12 October 2023 | Kirani James Athletic Stadium, St. George's, Grenada | Grenada | 4–1 | 4–1 | 2023–24 CONCACAF Nations League A |
| 6 | 21 November 2023 | BMO Field, Toronto, Canada | Canada | 3–2 | 3–2 | 2023–24 CONCACAF Nations League A |
| 7 | 14 October 2025 | Independence Park, Kingston, Jamaica | Bermuda | 2–0 | 4–0 | 2026 FIFA World Cup qualification |

== Honours ==
Fulham

- EFL Championship: 2021–22; play-offs: 2020

Individual

- Bristol City Player of the Year: 2017–18
- EFL Team of the Season: 2017–18
- PFA Team of the Year: 2017–18 Championship
- CONCACAF Gold Cup Goal of the Tournament: 2021
