= 2014–15 Bristol City F.C. season =

Bristol City
2014–15 season
- Chairman: Steve Lansdown
- Manager: Steve Cotterill
- Stadium: Ashton Gate
- League One: 1st (promoted)
- FA Cup: Fourth round (eliminated by West Ham United)
- League Cup: First round (eliminated by Oxford United)
- Football League Trophy: Winners
- Top goalscorer: League: Aaron Wilbraham (18); All: Aaron Wilbraham (18)
- Highest home attendance: 13,731 vs Yeovil Town(L1, 26 December 2014)
- Lowest home attendance: 6,145 vs Oxford United(LC, 12 August 2014)
Home colours	Away colours	Third colours

The 2014–15 season was Bristol City's 117th season as a professional football club and their second consecutive season in the 3rd Division of the Football League since their relegation from the Championship.

The club enjoyed a memorable season of success, earning promotion while winning a double of the Football League Trophy, and in doing so becoming the first club to win the trophy three times, and the League One title, the club's first league title in 60 years.

== Squad ==
No.	Name	Position (s)	Nationality	Place of Birth	Date of birth (age)	Club caps	Club goals	Signed from	Date signed	Fee	Contract End
Goalkeepers
1	Frank Fielding	GK	(England)	Blackburn (England)	4 April 1988 (age 38)	77	0	Derby County	26 June 2013	£200,000	30 June 2016
13	David Richards	GK	(Wales)	Abergavenny (Wales)	31 December 1993 (age 32)	0	0	Cardiff City	1 January 2014	Free	30 June 2015
Defenders
2	Mark Little	RB/CB	(England)	Worcester (England)	20 August 1988 (age 37)	45	2	Peterborough United	25 June 2014	Free	30 June 2017
3	Derrick Williams	LB	(Republic of Ireland)	Hamburg (Germany)	17 January 1993 (age 33)	105	3	Aston Villa	24 June 2013	Free	30 June 2016
4	Aden Flint	CB	(England)	Pinxton (England)	11 July 1989 (age 36)	101	18	Swindon Town	11 June 2013	£300,000	30 June 2017
5	Karleigh Osborne	CB	(England)	Southall (England)	19 March 1988 (age 38)	32	1	Millwall	7 January 2014]	Undisclosed	30 June 2016
6	Adam El-Abd	CB	(Egypt)	Brighton (England)	11 September 1984 (age 41)	20	0	Brighton & Hove Albion	16 January 2014	Undisclosed	30 June 2017
17	Greg Cunningham	LB/LM	(Republic of Ireland)	Carnmore (Republic of Ireland)	31 January 1991 (age 35)	106	6	Manchester City	5 July 2012	Undisclosed	30 June 2016
22	Luke Ayling	RB/CB	(England)	London (England)	25 August 1991 (age 34)	59	4	Yeovil Town	8 July 2014	Undisclosed	30 June 2017
24	James Tavernier	RB	(England)	Bradford (England)	31 October 1991 (age 34)	13	3	Wigan Athletic	15 January 2015	Loan	30 June 2015
Midfielders
7	Korey Smith	CM	(England)	Hatfield (England)	31 January 1991 (age 35)	55	2	Oldham Athletic	27 June 2014	Undisclosed	30 June 2017
8	Wade Elliott	CM	(England)	Eastleigh (England)	14 December 1978 (age 47)	61	5	Birmingham City	25 June 2014	Free	30 June 2015
11	Scott Wagstaff	RM/RB	(England)	Maidstone (England)	31 March 1990 (age 36)	80	8	Charlton Athletic	8 July 2013	Free	30 June 2016
14	Bobby Reid	CM/AM	(England)	Bristol (England)	2 February 1993 (age 33)	41	2	Academy	29 April 2011	Trainee	30 June 2016
15	Luke Freeman	RM/LM/CF	(England)	Dartford (England)	22 March 1992 (age 34)	56	7	Stevenage	26 June 2014	Undisclosed	30 June 2017
21	Marlon Pack	RM/CM	(England)	Portsmouth (England)	25 March 1991 (age 35)	97	3	Cheltenham Town	2 August 2013	£100,000	30 June 2015
23	Joe Bryan	LM/LB	(England)	Bristol (England)	17 September 1993 (age 32)	92	10	Academy	1 August 2011	Trainee	30 June 2016
Forwards
10	Jay Emmanuel-Thomas	RW/CF/SS	(England)	London (England)	27 December 1990 (age 35)	104	33	Ipswich Town	8 July 2013	Swap Deal	30 June 2015
18	Aaron Wilbraham	CF	(England)	Knutsford (England)	21 October 1979 (age 46)	43	21	Crystal Palace	2 July 2014	Free	30 June 2015
19	Kieran Agard	CF/WG	(England)	Newham (England)	10 October 1989 (age 36)	46	15	Rotherham United	21 August 2014	Undisclosed	30 June 2017
20	Wesley Burns	ST/RW/CM	(Wales)	Cardiff (Wales)	28 October 1994 (age 31)	37	3	Academy	18 December 2012	Trainee	30 June 2016

=== Statistics ===
As of 15 April 2015

No.	Pos	Nat	Player	Total		League One		FA Cup		League Cup		League Trophy	
No.	Pos	Nat	Player	Apps	Goals	Apps	Goals	Apps	Goals	Apps	Goals	Apps	Goals
1	GK	(England) ENG	Frank Fielding	58	0	46+0	0	5+0	0	1+0	0	6+0	0
2	DF	(England) ENG	Mark Little	43	2	35+2	1	4+0	0	0+0	0	1+1	1
3	DF	(Republic of Ireland) IRL	Derrick Williams	57	3	45+0	2	5+0	0	1+0	0	6+0	1
4	DF	(England) ENG	Aden Flint	57	15	46+0	14	5+0	0	0+0	0	6+0	1
7	MF	(England) ENG	Korey Smith	55	2	44+0	0	4+1	0	0+0	0	6+0	2
8	MF	(England) ENG	Wade Elliott	42	2	26+10	2	2+0	0	1+0	0	1+2	0
10	FW	(England) ENG	Jay Emmanuel-Thomas	48	12	10+26	9	5+0	3	1+0	0	4+2	0
11	MF	(England) ENG	Scott Wagstaff	36	2	2+24	2	3+2	0	1+0	0	3+1	0
13	GK	(Wales) WAL	David Richards	0	0	0+0	0	0+0	0	0+0	0	0+0	0
15	MF	(England) ENG	Luke Freeman	56	7	45+2	7	2+3	0	0+0	0	4+0	0
17	DF	(Republic of Ireland) IRL	Greg Cunningham	32	3	9+15	2	3+0	1	0+0	0	3+2	0
18	FW	(England) ENG	Aaron Wilbraham	44	21	33+4	18	1+1	0	0+1	0	4+0	3
19	FW	(England) ENG	Kieran Agard	46	14	34+4	13	2+2	1	0+0	0	2+2	0
20	FW	(Wales) WAL	Wesley Burns	6	2	0+2	1	0+1	0	0+1	0	2+0	1
21	MF	(England) ENG	Marlon Pack	44	3	21+12	3	3+2	0	1+0	0	4+1	0
22	DF	(England) ENG	Luke Ayling	58	4	46+0	4	5+0	0	1+0	0	5+1	0
23	MF	(England) ENG	Joe Bryan	50	7	39+1	6	3+2	0	1+0	1	3+1	0
24	DF	(England) ENG	James Tavernier (on loan from Wigan Athletic	13	3	9+3	3	0+0	0	0+0	0	1+0	0
Players currently out on loan:
5	DF	(England) ENG	Karleigh Osborne (at Colchester United)	3	0	0+1	0	0+1	0	1+0	0	0+0	0
6	DF	(Egypt) EGY	Adam El-Abd (at Bury)	6	0	0+2	0	1+0	0	1+0	0	1+1	0
14	MF	(England) ENG	Bobby Reid (at Plymouth Argyle)	3	0	0+2	0	0+0	0	1+0	0	0+0	0
Players who have left the club during the season:
9	FW	(England) ENG	Sam Baldock	5	0	4+0	0	0+0	0	1+0	0	0+0	0
9	FW	(England) ENG	Matt Smith (on loan from Fulham)	21	13	11+3	7	4+0	1	0+0	0	3+0	5
12	DF	(England) ENG	Todd Kane (on loan from Chelsea)	7	0	1+4	0	2+0	0	0+0	0	0+0	0
12	MF	(England) ENG	George Saville (on loan from Wolverhampton Wanderers)	10	1	1+7	1	2+0	0	0+0	0	0+0	0
16	MF	(England) ENG	Jordan Wynter	3	0	0+0	0	0+0	0	1+0	0	0+2	0

=== Goalscorers ===
As of 3 May 2015

Rank	No.	Pos.	Name	League One	FA Cup	League Cup	League Trophy	Total
1	18	FW	Aaron Wilbraham	18	0	0	3	21
2	4	DF	Aden Flint	14	0	0	1	15
3	19	FW	Kieran Agard	13	1	0	0	14
4	~~9~~	FW	Matt Smith	7	1	0	5	13
5	10	FW	Jay Emmanuel-Thomas	9	3	0	0	12
6	15	MF	Luke Freeman	7	0	0	0	7
6	23	MF	Joe Bryan	6	0	1	0	7
7	22	DF	Luke Ayling	4	0	0	0	4
9	3	DF	Derrick Williams	2	0	0	1	3
9	17	DF	Greg Cunningham	2	1	0	0	3
9	21	MF	Marlon Pack	3	0	0	0	3
9	24	DF	James Tavernier	3	0	0	0	3
13	2	DF	Mark Little	1	0	0	1	2
13	7	MF	Korey Smith	0	0	0	2	2
13	8	MF	Wade Elliott	2	0	0	0	2
13	11	MF	Scott Wagstaff	2	0	0	0	2
13	20	FW	Wesley Burns	1	0	0	1	2
17	12	MF	George Saville	1	0	0	0	1
Own Goals				1	0	0	0	1
Total				92	6	1	13	112

=== Disciplinary record ===
As of 3 May 2015

No.	Pos.	Name	League One		FA Cup		League Cup		League Trophy		Total	
No.	Pos.	Name	Booked	Sent off (straight red)	Booked	Sent off (straight red)	Booked	Sent off (straight red)	Booked	Sent off (straight red)	Booked	Sent off (straight red)
1	GK	Frank Fielding	1	0	0	0	0	0	1	0	2	0
2	DF	Mark Little	3	0	1	0	0	0	0	0	4	0
3	DF	Derrick Williams	4	1	0	0	0	0	0	0	4	1
4	DF	Aden Flint	1	0	0	0	0	0	0	0	1	0
6	DF	Adam El-Abd	0	0	0	0	1	0	0	0	1	0
7	MF	Korey Smith	5	0	0	0	0	0	0	0	5	0
8	MF	Wade Elliott	2	1	0	0	0	0	0	0	2	1
~~9~~	FW	Sam Baldock	1	0	0	0	0	0	0	0	1	0
~~9~~	FW	Matt Smith	1	0	0	0	0	0	0	0	1	0
11	MF	Scott Wagstaff	2	0	0	0	0	0	0	0	2	0
~~12~~	DF	Todd Kane	1	0	1	0	0	0	0	0	2	0
12	MF	George Saville	2	0	0	0	0	0	0	0	2	0
15	MF	Luke Freeman	2	0	0	0	0	0	1	0	3	0
16	MF	Jordan Wynter	0	0	0	0	0	0	1	0	1	0
17	DF	Greg Cunningham	2	0	0	0	0	0	0	0	2	0
18	FW	Aaron Wilbraham	5	0	0	0	0	0	0	0	5	0
19	FW	Kieran Agard	4	0	0	0	0	0	0	0	4	0
21	MF	Marlon Pack	2	0	0	0	0	0	0	0	2	0
22	DF	Luke Ayling	3	0	0	0	0	0	1	0	4	0
23	MF	Joe Bryan	4	0	0	0	1	0	0	0	5	0
Total			46	2	2	0	2	0	4	0	54	2

=== Contracts ===
No.	Pos.	Nat.	Name	Age	Status	Contract length	Expiry date	Source
13	GK	(Wales)	Dave Richards	20	Signed	1 year	June 2015	BBC Sport
23	MF	(England)	Joe Bryan	20	Signed	2 years	June 2016	BBC Sport
20	FW	(Wales)	Wes Burns	19	Signed	2 years	June 2016	BBC Sport
14	MF	(England)	Bobby Reid	21	Signed	2 years	June 2016	BBC Sport

== Transfers ==
=== In ===
No.	Pos.	Nat.	Name	Age	EU	Moving from	Type	Transfer window	Ends	Transfer fee	Source
8	MF	(England)	Wade Elliott	35	EU	Birmingham City	Free transfer	Summer	2015	Free	
2	DF	(England)	Mark Little	25	EU	Peterborough United	Free transfer	Summer	2017	Free	
15	MF	(England)	Luke Freeman	22	EU	Stevenage	Transfer	Summer	2017	Undisclosed	
7	MF	(England)	Korey Smith	23	EU	Oldham Athletic	Transfer	Summer	2017	Undisclosed	
18	FW	(England)	Aaron Wilbraham	34	EU	Crystal Palace	Free transfer	Summer	2015	Free	
22	DF	(England)	Luke Ayling	22	EU	Yeovil Town	Free transfer	Summer	2017	Free	
19	FW	(England)	Kieran Agard	24	EU	Rotherham United	Transfer	Summer	2017	Undisclosed	

=== Loans in ===
No.	Pos.	Name	Country	Age	Loan club	Started	Ended	Start source	End source
12	DF	Todd Kane	(England)	21	Chelsea	15 November 2014	8 January 2015		
9	FW	Matt Smith	(England)	25	Fulham	27 November 2014	25 January 2015		
12	MF	George Saville	(England)	21	Wolverhampton Wanderers	15 January 2015	18 April 2015		
24	DF	James Tavernier	(England)	23	Wigan Athletic	15 January 2015	30 June 2015		

Sources: For loan start source see "Start source". For loan end source see "End source".
EU = if holds or not a European Union passport; Country: when 2 flags, 1st flag = country that plays for internationally, 2nd flag = country of birth; No. = number on jersey; P = Position (for position name, pause mouse pointer on abbreviation); Name = Name on jersey (for more extensive name, pause mouse pointer on name); In/Out = In: The player came in on loan, Out: The player went out on loan; Loan club = the club that the player moved on loan to or the club that the player came from on loan; Started = the date when the player's loan started; Ended = the date when the player's loan ended.

=== Out ===
No.	Pos.	Name	Country	Age	Type	Moving to	Transfer window	Transfer fee	Apps	Goals	Source
26	DF	Mitch Brundle	(England)	19	Contract ended	Braintree Town	Summer	Free	0	0	
6	DF	Louis Carey	(Scotland) (England)	37	Contract ended	Free agent	Summer	Free	649	15	
4	DF	Liam Fontaine	(England)	28	Contract ended	Hibernian (Scotland)	Summer	Free	294	7	
25	MF	Marvin Elliott	(Jamaica) (England)	29	Contract ended	Crawley Town	Summer	Free	262	26	
—	FW	Kevin Krans	(England)	21	Contract ended	Free agent	Summer	Free	0	0	
19	MF	Stephen Pearson	(Scotland)	31	Contract ended	Motherwell (Scotland)	Summer	Free	74	7	
7	MF	Liam Kelly	(Scotland)	24	Transfer	Oldham Athletic	Summer	Undisclosed	21	0	
2	DF	Brendan Moloney	(Republic of Ireland)	25	Contract terminated	Yeovil Town	Summer	Free	49	0	
13	GK	Elliot Parish	(England)	24	Free transfer	Blackpool	Summer	Free	19	0	
9	FW	Sam Baldock	(England)	25	Transfer	Brighton & Hove Albion	Summer	Undisclosed	83	34	
16	MF	Jordan Wynter	(England)	21	Free transfer	Cheltenham Town	Winter	Free	3	0	

EU = if holds or not a European Union passport; Country: when 2 flags, 1st flag = country that plays for internationally, 2nd flag = country of birth; N = number on jersey; P = Position (for position name, pause mouse pointer on abbreviation); Name = Name on jersey (for more extensive name, pause mouse pointer on name); Age = age on the day of the signing; Moving from = only indicate the club the player was playing before start playing for this club in this season, for the type of the moving see Status column; Moving to = only indicates the club the player is going to play next, for the type of the moving see Status column; Ends = when the player's current contract ends; n/a = Not applicable; Apps = Total number of competitive appearances (including substitute appearances) at the club prior to departure; Goals = Total number of competitive goals scored at the club prior to departure.

=== Loans out ===
No.	Pos.	Name	Country	Age	Loan club	Started	Ended	Start source	End source
16	DF	Jordan Wynter	(England)	20	Cheltenham Town	21 August 2014	22 September 2014		
14	MF	Bobby Reid	(England)	21	Plymouth Argyle	25 September 2014	13 November 2014		
14	MF	Bobby Reid	(England)	21	Plymouth Argyle	26 November 2014	3 January 2015		
6	DF	Adam El-Abd	(Egypt)	30	Bury	26 November 2014	30 June 2015		
20	FW	Wes Burns	(Wales)	20	Oxford United	27 November 2014	2 February 2015		
14	MF	Bobby Reid	(England)	21	Plymouth Argyle	21 January 2015	30 June 2015		
20	FW	Wes Burns	(Wales)	20	Cheltenham Town	2 February 2015	30 June 2015		
5	DF	Karleigh Osborne	(England)	26	Colchester United	26 February 2015	4 May 2015		

Sources: For loan start source see "Start source". For loan end source see "End source".
EU = if holds or not a European Union passport; Country: when 2 flags, 1st flag = country that plays for internationally, 2nd flag = country of birth; No. = number on jersey; P = Position (for position name, pause mouse pointer on abbreviation); Name = Name on jersey (for more extensive name, pause mouse pointer on name); In/Out = In: The player came in on loan, Out: The player went out on loan; Loan club = the club that the player moved on loan to or the club that the player came from on loan; Started = the date when the player's loan started; Ended = the date when the player's loan ended.

== Match details ==
=== Pre-season ===
5 July 2014	Portishead Town	1–6	Bristol City	Portishead
15:00 BST	Sivers		Osborne; Reid; Emmanuel-Thomas; Wagstaff; Hall	Stadium: Bristol Road; Attendance: 1,000

9 July 2014	Weston-super-Mare	2–1	Bristol City	Weston-super-Mare
19:45 BST	Grubb 62'; Mawford 69'	Report	Wilbraham 23'	Stadium: Woodspring Stadium

29 July 2014	Cheltenham Town	1–4	Bristol City	Cheltenham
19:45 BST	Richards 22' (pen.)	Report	Baldock 15'; Wilbraham 67'; Bryan 73'; Flint 77'	Stadium: Whaddon Road

=== League One ===
==== League table ====
Pos	Team	Pld	W	D	L	GF	GA	GD	Pts	Promotion, qualification or relegation
1	Bristol City (C, P)	46	29	12	5	96	38	+58	99	Promotion to Football League Championship
2	Milton Keynes Dons (P)	46	27	10	9	101	44	+57	91	Promotion to Football League Championship
3	Preston North End (O, P)	46	25	14	7	79	40	+39	89	Qualification for League One play-offs (Note: Four teams play for one spot and promotion to Football League Championship.)
4	Swindon Town	46	23	10	13	76	57	+19	79	Qualification for League One play-offs
5	Sheffield United	46	19	14	13	66	53	+13	71	Qualification for League One play-offs

Updated to match(es) played on 3 May 2015. Source: BBC Sport
Rules for classification: 1) Points; 2) Goal difference; 3) Number of goals scored
(C) Champions; (O) Play-off winners; (P) Promoted

==== Results summary ====
Overall								Home						Away					
Pld	W	D	L	GF	GA	GD	Pts	W	D	L	GF	GA	GD	W	D	L	GF	GA	GD
46	29	12	5	96	38	+58	99	16	5	2	48	17	+31	13	7	3	48	21	+27

Last updated: 10 May 2015.
Source: BBC Sport

==== Results by round ====
Round	1	2	3	4	5	6	7	8	9	10	11	12	13	14	15	16	17	18	19	20	21	22	23	24	25	26	27	28	29	30	31	32	33	34	35	36	37	38	39	40	41	42	43	44	45	46
Ground	A	H	H	A	A	H	H	A	A	H	A	H	A	H	A	H	A	H	A	H	A	H	A	H	A	H	A	H	H	H	A	A	H	A	A	A	H	H	H	A	H	A	A	H	A	H
Result	W	W	D	D	W	W	W	W	D	W	D	W	W	D	D	W	L	L	W	W	L	W	W	W	W	W	D	W	L	W	L	W	W	W	W	W	D	W	D	D	W	D	W	D	W	W
Position	1	1	3	4	3	2	1	1	1	1	1	1	1	1	1	1	1	1	1	1	1	1	1	1	2	1	1	1	1	1	1	1	1	1	1	1	1	1	1	1	1	1	1	1	1	1

Updated to match(es) played on 10 May 2015. Source: BBC Sport
A = Away; H = Home; W = Win; D = Draw; L = Loss

==== Matches ====
9 August 1	Sheffield United	1–2	Bristol City	Sheffield
12:15	Higdon 32'; Davies (yellow card) 78'	BBC Report	20' Wilbraham; Little (yellow card) 48'; Smith (yellow card) 51'; 72' Elliott	Stadium: Bramall Lane; Attendance: 19,889; Referee: Paul Tierney

16 August 2	Bristol City	2–1	Colchester United	Bristol
15:00	46', 68' Wilbraham	BBC Report	9' Moncur	Stadium: Ashton Gate; Attendance: 11,626; Referee: Brendan Malone

19 August 3	Bristol City	0–0	Leyton Orient	Bristol
19:45		Report		Stadium: Ashton Gate; Attendance: 11,692; Referee: (England) Simon Hooper

23 August 4	Rochdale	1–1	Bristol City	Rochdale
15:00	Henderson 56'	Report	16' Freeman	Stadium: Spotland Stadium; Attendance: 3,115; Referee: Mark Haywood

31 August 5	Notts County	1–2	Bristol City	Nottingham
13:15	Ismail 13'	Report	60' Wilbraham; 90' (pen) Emmanuel-Thomas	Stadium: Meadow Lane; Attendance: 5,678; Referee: Dean Whitestone

6 September 6	Bristol City	2–0	Scunthorpe United	Bristol
15:00	Flint 52'; Cunningham 83'	Report		Stadium: Ashton Gate; Attendance: 12,007; Referee: Charles Breakspear

13 September 7	Bristol City	3–0	Doncaster Rovers	Bristol
15:00	Wilbraham 13'; Little 30'; Agard 82'	Report	(yellow card) 10' (yellow-red card) 51' Forrester	Stadium: Ashton Gate; Attendance: 11,733; Referee: Michael Bull

16 September 8	Port Vale	0–3	Bristol City	Burslem
19:45		Report	Wilbraham 13', 61'; Flint 48'	Stadium: Vale Park; Attendance: 4,050; Referee: Andy Woolmer

20 September 9	Fleetwood Town	3–3	Bristol City	Fleetwood
15:00	Morris 22'; Proctor 61'; Dobbie 89'	BBC Report	31', 47' (yellow card) 82' Agard; 51' Wilbraham; (yellow card) 80' Smith	Stadium: Highbury Stadium; Attendance: 3,700; Referee: Scott Mathieson

27 September 10	Bristol City	3–2	Milton Keynes Dons	Bristol
15:00	Agard 4', 35' (pen.); Elliott 74'	BBC Report	51' Bowditch; 73' Adobe	Stadium: Ashton Gate; Attendance: 13,119; Referee: Oliver Langford

4 October 11	Walsall	1–1	Bristol City	Walsall
15:00	Downing (yellow card) 40'; Sawyers 85'	Report	Bryan 11'; Agard (yellow card) 21'	Stadium: Bescot Stadium; Attendance: 5,574; Referee: Keith Hill

11 October 12	Bristol City	3–2	Chesterfield	Bristol
15:00	Evatt 9' (o.g.); Williams 46'; Burns 90'	BBC Report	Doyle 25' (pen.), 59' (yellow card) 44'; Clucas (yellow card) 67'; Morsy (yellow card) 74'	Stadium: Ashton Gate; Attendance: 12,558; Referee: Andy Davies

18 October 13	Coventry City	1–3	Bristol City	Coventry
15:00	Miller 76'	BBC Report	11' Pack; 45' Agard; 90' Wagstaff	Stadium: Ricoh Arena; Attendance: 11,888; Referee: Scott Duncan

21 October 14	Bristol City	2–2	Bradford City	Bristol
19:45	Flint 8', 82'	BBC Report	20' Clarke; 85' Routis	Stadium: Ashton Gate; Attendance: 12,548; Referee: Darren Bond

25 October 2014 15	Barnsley	2–2	Bristol City	Barnsley
15:00	Winnall (yellow card) 58' (goal) 59'; Hourihane 68' (pen.)	Report	36' Ayling; 79' Wilbraham	Stadium: Oakwell; Attendance: 9,000; Referee: Darren Deadman

1 November 2014 16	Bristol City	1–0	Oldham Athletic	Bristol
15:00	Agard 57'	BBC Report		Stadium: Ashton Gate; Attendance: 12,696; Referee: Phil Gibbs

15 November 2014 17	Swindon Town	1–0	Bristol City	Swindon
15:00	Smith 78'	BBC Report	Elliott (red card) 3'	Stadium: The County Ground; Attendance: 12,565; Referee: Darren Drysdale

22 November 2014 18	Bristol City	0–1	Preston North End	Bristol
15:00		Report	Robinson 28'; Gallagher (yellow card) 30'; Welsh (yellow card) 60'; Kilkenny (yellow card) 72'; Davies (yellow card) 85'	Stadium: Ashton Gate; Attendance: 13,245; Referee: Roger East

28 November 2014 19	Peterborough United	0–3	Bristol City	Peterborough
19:45	Zakuani (yellow card) 90+3'	Report	Freeman 11', 64'; Wilbraham 16'	Stadium: London Road Stadium; Attendance: 6,804; Referee: Paul Tierney

13 December 2014 20	Bristol City	1–0	Crawley Town	Bristol
15:00	Ayling 87'; Pack (yellow card) 90+3'	Report	Keane (yellow card) 69'	Stadium: Ashton Gate; Attendance: 11,660; Referee: Michael Bull

20 December 2014 21	Crewe Alexandra	1–0	Bristol City	Crewe
15:00	Ikpeazu (yellow card) 45+2'; Ray (yellow card) 53'; Ness 74'	Report	Williams (yellow card) 29' (yellow-red card) 50'	Stadium: Gresty Road; Attendance: 4,927; Referee: Andy Haines

26 December 2014 22	Bristol City	2–1	Yeovil Town	Bristol
15:00	54' Matt Smith; 61' (pen.)Jay Emmanuel-Thomas; (yellow card) 53'; Todd Kane	Report	Ben Nugent 88' (yellow card) 62'; James Berrett (yellow card) 63'; Nathan Smith (yellow card) 64'; Stephen Arthurworrey (yellow card) 81'; Ben Nugent	Stadium: Ashton Gate; Attendance: 13,731; Referee: Kevin Johnson

28 December 2014 23	Gillingham	1–3	Bristol City	Gillingham
15:00	47' Cody McDonald; (yellow card) 58' Brendan Dickenson (yellow card) 79'; Michael Doughty (yellow card) 90'; Joe Martin	Report	34' 44' Matt Smith; 55' Scott Wagstaff; (yellow card) 38'Greg Cunningham; (yellow card) 90+1'Joe Bryan	Stadium: Priestfield Stadium; Attendance: 6,216; Referee: Lee Collins

10 January 2015 24	Bristol City	4–0	Notts County	Bristol
15:00	Bryan 8'; Smith 43'; Emmanuel-Thomas 62'; Williams 84'	Report		Stadium: Ashton Gate; Attendance: 12,817; Referee: Simon Hooper

17 January 2015 25	Scunthorpe United	0–2	Bristol City	Scunthorpe
15:00		Report	Emmanuel-Thomas 35' (pen.); Bryan (yellow card) 62'; Freeman 85'	Stadium: Glanford Park; Attendance: 3,611; Referee: (England) Jeremy Simpson

1 February 2015 26	Bristol City	2–0	Fleetwood Town	Bristol
15:00	K. Smith (yellow card) 28'; M. Smith 52'; Saville (yellow card) 68'; Emmanuel-Thomas 90+2'	Report	Hornby-Forbes (yellow card) 36'; Evans (yellow card) 57'; Jordan (yellow card) 69'; McLaughlin (yellow card) 90+2'	Stadium: Ashton Gate; Attendance: 11,654; Referee: Gavin Ward

7 February 2015 27	Milton Keynes Dons	0–0	Bristol City	Milton Keynes
15:00	McFadzean (yellow card) 58'; Carruthers (yellow card) 86'	Report	Ayling (yellow card) 72'; Bryan (yellow card) 89'	Stadium: Stadium mk Attendance: 15,642; Referee: Craig Pawson

10 February 2015 28	Bristol City	3–1	Port Vale	Bristol
19:45	Emmanuel-Thomas 34'; Bryan 59'; Smith 67'	Report	Birchall (yellow card) 37'; Marshall 77'	Stadium: Ashton Gate; Attendance: 10,890; Referee: Brendan Malone

14 February 2015 29	Bristol City	1–3	Sheffield United	Bristol
15:00	M. Smith 41'; Ayling (yellow card) 55'; Little (yellow card) 74'; Wagstaff (yellow card) 90+7'	Report	Coutts (yellow card) 26'; Basham (yellow card) 34'; Done 54', 77'; Doyle (yellow card) 57'; Murphy 82'	Stadium: Ashton Gate; Attendance: 11,767; Referee: Graham Salisbury

17 February 2015 30	Bristol City	2–0	Peterborough United	Bristol
19:45	Flint 9'; Agard 48'	Report	Smith (yellow card) 34'	Stadium: Ashton Gate; Attendance: 11,101; Referee: Christopher Sarginson

21 February 2015 31	Colchester United	3–2	Bristol City	Colchester
15:00	Lapslie 3'; Bonne 14'; Porter 26'	Report	Tavernier 50'; Flint 61'	Stadium: Colchester Community Stadium; Attendance: 4,300; Referee: Steve Martin

24 February 2015 32	Doncaster Rovers	1–3	Bristol City	Doncaster
19:45 GMT	Main 57'	Report	Freeman 10'; Cunningham 33' (pen.) (yellow card) 73'; Wilbraham 69' (yellow card) 70'; Little (yellow card) 72'; Fielding (yellow card) 81'; Smith (yellow card) 90+2'	Stadium: Keepmoat Stadium; Attendance: 5,495; Referee: Stuart Attwell

28 February 2015 33	Bristol City	1–0	Rochdale	Bristol
15:00 GMT	Wilbraham 14'	BBC Report		Stadium: Ashton Gate; Attendance: 11,841; Referee: James Adcock

3 March 2015 34	Leyton Orient	1–3	Bristol City	London
19:45 GMT	Dagnall 4'	BBC Report	12' Freeman; 21' Flint; 60' Wilbraham	Stadium: Dean Court; Attendance: 4,511; Referee: Iain Williamson

7 March 2015 35	Crawley Town	1–2	Bristol City	Crawley
15:00 GMT	Wordsworth 60'	BBC Report	48' Flint; 84' Ayling	Stadium: Broadfield Stadium; Attendance: 3,333; Referee: Andy D'Urso

10 March 2015 36	Yeovil Town	0–3	Bristol City	Yeovil
19:45 GMT	Arthurworrey (yellow card) 68'	Report	Agard 47'; Freeman 49'; Saville 86'	Stadium: Huish Park; Attendance: 6,591; Referee: Andy Woolmer

14 March 2015 37	Bristol City	0–0	Gillingham	Bristol
15:00 GMT	Freeman (yellow card) 90+2'	Report	Martin (yellow card) 90+2'	Stadium: Ashton Gate; Attendance: 11,601; Referee: David Webb

17 March 2015 38	Bristol City	3–0	Crewe Alexandra	Bristol
19:45 GMT	Wilbraham 32'; Flint 42'; Emmanuel-Thomas 84'	BBC Report	(yellow card) 45' Ikpeazu	Stadium: Ashton Gate; Attendance: 10,719; Referee: Trevor Kettle

28 March 2015 39	Bristol City	2–2	Barnsley	Bristol
15:00 GMT	Pack 13' (pen.); Bryan 84'	Report	Ibehere 44' (yellow card) 74'; Scowen 53'	Stadium: Ashton Gate; Attendance: 11,937; Referee: (England) Mark Brown

3 April 2015 40	Oldham Athletic	1–1	Bristol City	Oldham
15:00 GMT	Winchester 75'	Report	Smith (yellow card) 9'; Wilbraham 71'	Stadium: Boundary Park; Attendance: 4,577; Referee: (England) Seb Stockbridge

7 April 2015 41	Bristol City	3–0	Swindon Town	Bristol
19:45 GMT	Agard 36' (yellow card) 57'; Bryan 80'; Wilbraham 87'	Report	Turnbull (yellow card) 10'; Yaser Kasim (yellow card) 42'; Raphael Rossi Branco (yellow card) 79'	Stadium: Ashton Gate; Attendance: 12,302; Referee: (England) Neil Swarbrick

11 April 2015 42	Preston North End	1–1	Bristol City	Preston, Lancashire
15:00 GMT	King (yellow card) 30'; Beckford 59'; Wiseman (yellow card) 85'	BBC Report	63' Wilbraham	Stadium: Deepdale; Attendance: 16,441; Referee: Bobby Madley

14 April 2015 43	Bradford City	0–6	Bristol City	Bradford
19:45 GMT		BBC Report	17', 73' Tavernier; 35' Bryan; 54' Ayling; 66' Flint; 79' Wilbraham; (yellow card) 85' Saville	Stadium: Valley Parade; Attendance: 12,609; Referee: Stuart Attwell

18 April 2015 44	Bristol City	0–0	Coventry City	Bristol
15:00 GMT	Pack (yellow card) 17'; Bryan (yellow card) 25'	Report	(yellow card) 15' Nouble; (yellow card) 63' Willis; (yellow card) 78' Pennington; (yellow card) 80' O'Brien	Stadium: Ashton Gate; Attendance: 12,093; Referee: (England) David Coote

25 April 2015 45	Chesterfield	0–2	Bristol City	Chesterfield
15:00 GMT	Roberts (yellow card) 86'; Morsy (yellow card) 88'	Report	31' Agard; 59' Flint; (yellow card) 90+3' Elliott	Stadium: Proact Stadium; Attendance: 9,615; Referee: (England) Peter Bankes

3 May 2015 46	Bristol City	8–2	Walsall	Bristol
12:15 GMT	Flint 16', 67', 86'; Emmanuel-Thomas 22' (pen), 63'; Agard 57', 90'; Pack 62'	BBC Report	13', 36' Hiwula; (yellow card) 72' Chambers; (yellow card) 90' Downing	Stadium: Ashton Gate; Attendance: 11,960; Referee: Paul Tierney

=== FA Cup ===
The draw for the first round of the FA Cup was made on 27 October 2014.

8 November 2014 Round One	Gillingham	1–2	Bristol City	Gillingham
15:00	Kedwell 81' (pen.)	Report	40' Cunningham; 77' Emmanuel-Thomas	Stadium: Priestfield Stadium; Attendance: 2,654; Referee: Pat Miller

7 December 2014 Round Two	Bristol City	1–0	AFC Telford United	Bristol
14:00	Agard 90+2'	Report	McDonald (yellow card) 26'; Platt (yellow card) 44'; Parry (yellow card) 60'	Stadium: Ashton Gate; Attendance: 6,678; Referee: Jeremy Simpson

3 January 2015 Round Three	Doncaster Rovers	1–1	Bristol City	Doncaster
15:00	McCullough 50'	Report	75' M Smith	Stadium: Keepmoat Stadium; Attendance: 5,671; Referee: Scott Duncan

13 January 2015 Round Three Replay	Bristol City	2–0	Doncaster Rovers	Bristol
19:45	Emmanuel-Thomas 36' 79'	Report		Stadium: Ashton Gate; Attendance: 6,951; Referee: (England) Darren Bond

25 January 2015 Round Four	Bristol City	0–1	West Ham United	Bristol
14:00		Report	Sakho 81'	Stadium: Ashton Gate; Attendance: 12,682; Referee: (England) Lee Mason

=== League Cup ===
12 August 2014 Round One	Bristol City	1–2	Oxford United	Bristol
19:45	Bryan 2' (yellow card) 22'; El-Abd (yellow card) 70'	Report	55' Morris; Wright (yellow card) 60'; 87' Hylton	Stadium: Ashton Gate; Attendance: 6,145; Referee: Lee Collins

=== Football League Trophy ===
8 October 2014 Round Two	Cheltenham Town	1–3	Bristol City	Cheltenham
19:45	Taylor (yellow card) 61'; Gornell 64'; Marquis (yellow card) 90'	BBC Report	Burns 28'; Smith 56', 84'; Fielding (yellow card) 87'; Wynter (yellow card) 90'	Stadium: Whaddon Road; Attendance: 3,599; Referee: Keith Stroud

11 November 2014 Round Three	Bristol City	2–1	AFC Wimbledon	Bristol
19:45	Wilbraham 73', 77'	BBC Report	84' Francomb	Stadium: Ashton Gate; Attendance: 4,647; Referee: Stuart Attwell

10 December 2014 Area S-Final	Bristol City	2–0	Coventry City	Bristol
19:45	Williams 30'; Wilbraham 75'	Report	Johnson (yellow card) 29'; O'Brien (yellow card) 58'	Stadium: Ashton Gate; Attendance: 5,019; Referee: Steve Martin

6 January 2015 Area Final	Gillingham	2–4	Bristol City	Gillingham
19:45	McDonald 6', 70'	Report	18', 27', 50', 77' Smith	Stadium: Priestfield Stadium; Attendance: 2,368; Referee: Andy D'Urso

29 January 2015 Area Final	Bristol City	1–1 (5–3 agg.)	Gillingham	Bristol
19:45	Smith 17'; Freeman (yellow card) 43'; Ayling (yellow card) 53'	Report	McGlashan 31'; Hoyte (yellow card) 69'; Egan (yellow card) 79'	Stadium: Ashton Gate; Attendance: 8,469; Referee: (England) Graham Scott

22 March 2015 Final	Bristol City	2–0	Walsall	London
15:30	Flint 15'; Little 51'	BBC Report		Stadium: Wembley Stadium; Attendance: 72,315; Referee: Mick Russell

== Overall summary ==
=== Summary ===
Games played	58 (46 League One, 5 FA Cup, 1 League Cup, 6 League Trophy)
Games won	37 (29 League One, 3 FA Cup, 0 League Cup, 5 League Trophy)
Games drawn	14 (12 League One, 1 FA Cup, 0 League Cup, 1 League Trophy)
Games lost	7 (5 League One, 1 FA Cup, 1 League Cup, 0 League Trophy)
Goals scored	112 (92 League One, 6 FA Cup, 1 League Cup, 13League Trophy)
Goals conceded	45 (35 League One, 3 FA Cup, 2 League Cup, 5 League Trophy)
Goal difference	+67
Clean sheets	24 (20 League One, 2 FA Cup, 0 League Cup, 2 League Trophy)
Yellow cards	54 (46 League One, 2 FA Cup, 2 League Cup, 4 League Trophy)
Red cards	2 (2 League One, 0 FA Cup, 0 League Cup, 0 League Trophy)
Worst discipline	Derrick Williams (4 (yellow card) , 1 (red card) )
Best result	W 8–2 vs Walsall (2 May 15)
Worst result	L 1–3 vs Sheffield United (14 Feb 15)
Most appearances	Frank Fielding & Luke Ayling (58)
Top scorer	Aaron Wilbraham (21)
Points	99

=== Score overview ===
Opposition	Home score	Away score	Double
Barnsley	2–2	2–2	No
Bradford City	2–2	6–0	No
Chesterfield	3–2	2–0	Yes
Colchester United	2–1	2–3	No
Coventry City	0–0	3–1	No
Crawley Town	1–0	2–1	Yes
Crewe Alexandra	3–0	0–1	No
Doncaster Rovers	3–0	2–0	Yes
Fleetwood Town	2–0	3–3	No
Gillingham	0–0	3–1	No
Leyton Orient	0–0	3–1	No
Milton Keynes Dons	3–2	0–0	No
Notts County	4–0	2–1	Yes
Oldham Athletic	1–0	1–1	No
Peterborough United	2–0	3–0	Yes
Port Vale	3–1	3–0	Yes
Preston North End	0–1	1–1	No
Rochdale	1–0	1–1	No
Scunthorpe United	2–1	2–0	Yes
Sheffield United	1–3	2–1	No
Swindon Town	3–0	0–1	No
Walsall	8–2	1–1	No
Yeovil Town	2–1	3–0	Yes
