= Freddie Hinds =

English footballer (born 1999)

Personal information
- Full name: Fredrick Peter Hinds
- Date of birth: 28 January 1999 (age 27)
- Place of birth: Potton, England
- Height: 5 ft 9 in (1.76 m)
- Position: Striker

Team information
- Current team: Royston Town F.C. Royston Town F.C.

Youth career
- 2006–2016: Luton Town

Senior career*
Years	Team	Apps	(Gls)
2016–2017	Luton Town	0	(0)
2017–2021	Bristol City	1	(0)
2017–2018	→ Cheltenham Town (loan)	12	(0)
2018	→ Wrexham (loan)	0	(0)
2019	→ Bath City (loan)	17	(2)
2019–2020	→ Colchester United (loan)	0	(0)
2020	→ Bath City (loan)	3	(0)
2021	Hemel Hempstead Town	7	(2)
2021–	Wingate & Finchley	3	(0)
- * Club domestic league appearances and goals as of 23:14, 9 December 2021 (UTC)

Fredrick Peter Hinds (born 28 January 1999) is an English professional footballer who plays as a striker for Isthmian League club Wingate & Finchley.

== Career ==
=== Luton Town ===
Born in Potton, Bedfordshire, Hinds joined Luton Town at the age of seven and progressed through the club's youth system. He was a member of the under-18 team that won the Youth Alliance South East title and the Youth Alliance Cup in 2015–16, and also reached the quarter-finals of the FA Youth Cup, in which they lost 1–0 to Blackburn Rovers. Hinds made his Luton debut on 4 October 2016 in a 2–0 victory over West Bromwich Albion U23s in the EFL Trophy.

=== Bristol City ===
On 31 January 2017, Hinds signed for Championship club Bristol City for an undisclosed fee, signing a two-and-a-half-year contract, with the option of a further year. On 8 August 2017, Hinds made his debut for Bristol City, scoring in a 5–0 victory over Plymouth Argyle in the EFL Cup first round. He scored Bristol City's first goal in the second round two weeks later in a 3–2 away win over Premier League team Watford.

On 30 August 2017, Hinds signed for League Two club Cheltenham Town on loan until January 2018. He returned to Bristol City after the loan expired, having made 14 appearances and scored one goal for Cheltenham.

Hinds joined National League club Wrexham on 27 July 2018 on a season-long loan. However, he made no appearances for the club and his loan was terminated by mutual agreement on 23 November 2018. He joined National League South club Bath City on 4 January 2019 on a one-month loan. The loan was extended until the end of 2018–19 on 5 February.

He joined Colchester United of League Two on 28 August 2019 on loan until January 2020.

=== Non-league ===
Following his release from Bristol City, Hinds joined National League South side, Hemel Hempstead Town ahead of the 2021–22 campaign. In November 2021, he dropped down a division again to sign for Isthmian League Premier Division side Wingate & Finchley.

== Career statistics ==
As of match played 6 November 2021

Appearances and goals by club, season and competition
Club	Season	League			FA Cup		EFL Cup		Other		Total	
Club	Season	Division	Apps	Goals	Apps	Goals	Apps	Goals	Apps	Goals	Apps	Goals
Luton Town	2016–17	League Two	0	0	0	0	0	0	2 (Note: Appearances in EFL Trophy)	0	2	0
Bristol City	2016–17	Championship	0	0	0	0	0	0	—		0	0
Bristol City	2017–18	Championship	1	0	1	0	2	2	—		4	2
Bristol City	2018–19	Championship	0	0	—		—		—		0	0
Bristol City	2019–20	Championship	0	0	0	0	0	0	—		0	0
Bristol City	2020–21	Championship	0	0	0	0	0	0	—		0	0
Bristol City	Total		1	0	1	0	2	2	—		4	2
Cheltenham Town (loan)	2017–18	League Two	12	0	0	0	—		2	1	14	1
Wrexham (loan)	2018–19	National League	0	0	0	0	—		0	0	0	0
Bath City (loan)	2018–19	National League South	17	2	—		—		1 (Note: Appearance in National League South play-offs)	0	18	2
Colchester United (loan)	2019–20	League Two	0	0	0	0	0	0	0	0	0	0
Bath City (loan)	2020–21	National League South	3	0	2	1	—		0	0	5	1
Hemel Hempstead Town	2021–22	National League South	7	2	1	1	—		0	0	8	3
Career total			40	4	4	2	2	2	5	1	51	9
