= Joe Bryan =

English footballer (born 1993)

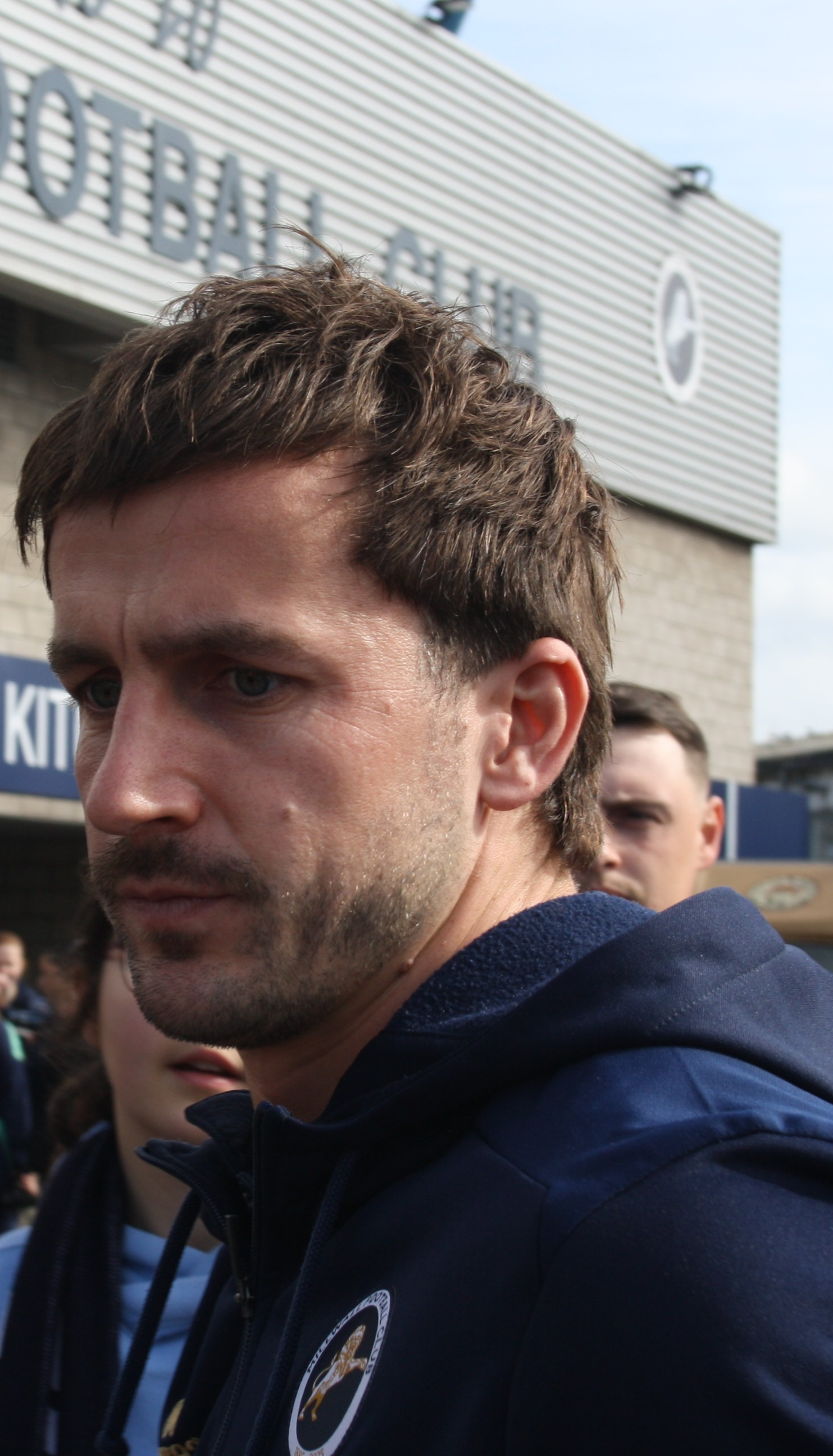
- Bryan in 2026

Personal information
- Full name: Joseph Edward Bryan
- Date of birth: 17 September 1993 (age 33)
- Place of birth: Bristol, England
- Height: 5 ft 8 in (1.73 m)
- Position: Left-back

Youth career
- 2009–2011: Bristol City

Senior career*
Years	Team	Apps	(Gls)
2011–2018	Bristol City	203	(16)
2011–2012	→ Bath City (loan)	4	(1)
2013	→ Plymouth Argyle (loan)	10	(1)
2018–2023	Fulham	105	(3)
2022–2023	→ Nice (loan)	6	(0)
2023–2026	Millwall	81	(3)
Total		399	(24)
- * Club domestic league appearances and goals

Joseph Edward Bryan (born 17 September 1993) is an English former professional footballer who played as a left-back.

He is also capable as a left-sided midfielder and left-sided wing-back. He has also made over 200 appearances for his hometown club Bristol City, as well as having loan spells with Bath City and Plymouth Argyle.

== Club career ==
=== Bristol City ===
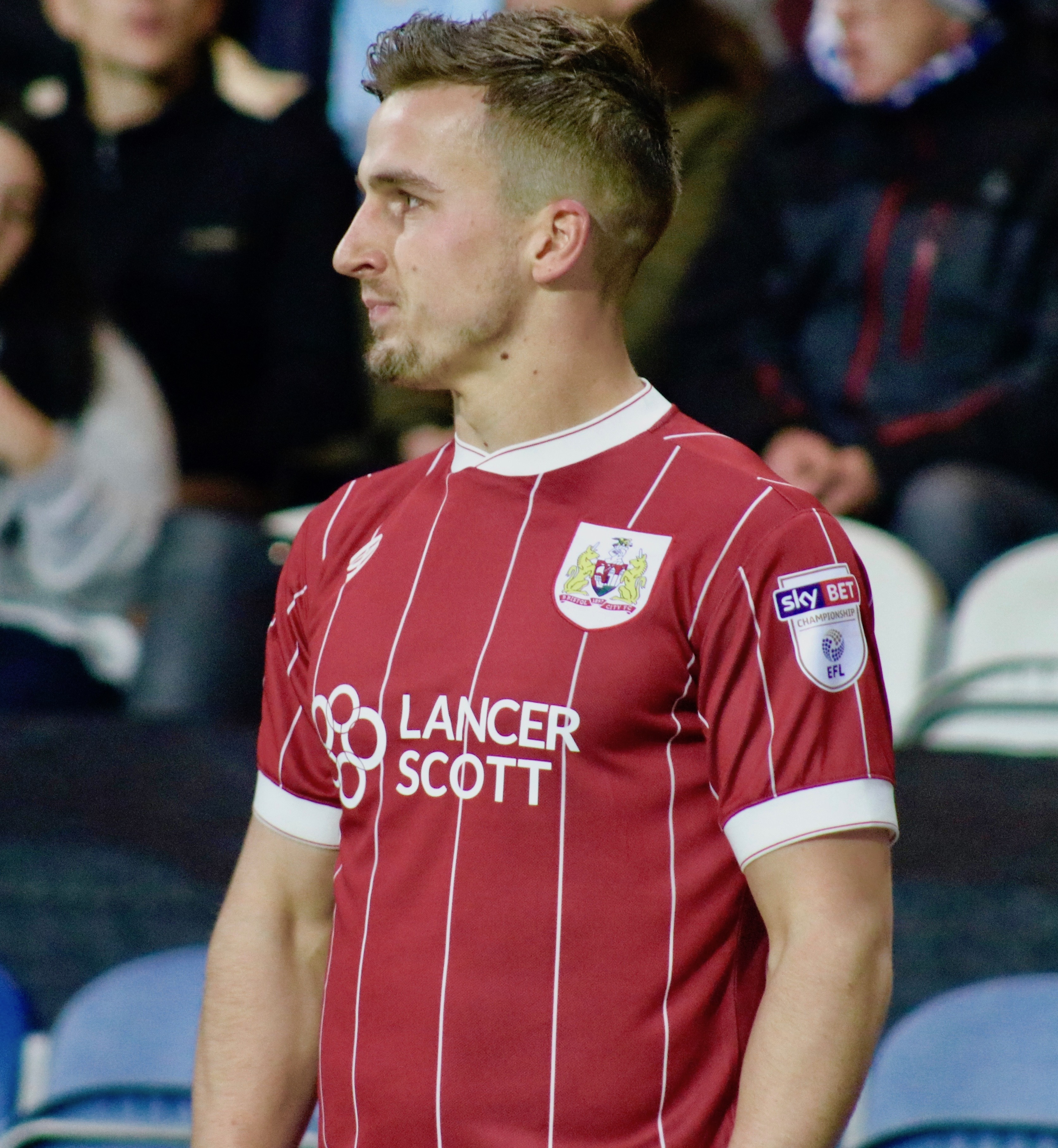
Bryan playing for Bristol City in 2017.

Bryan was born and raised in the area of Bristol. He came through his local team Bristol City's youth levels; signing his first professional contract in 2011, agreeing terms to be a Bristol City player for at least two years.

On 24 November 2011, Bryan joined Conference National side Bath City on a two-month loan deal, effectively lasting until January. He scored in a 3–1 win over AFC Telford United.

He made his professional debut for Bristol City on 6 March 2012, in a 3–2 win over Leicester City at Ashton Gate. In March 2013, he joined Plymouth Argyle on loan until the end of the season. Bryan made his debut for Plymouth the same day against Bradford City and scored his first Football League goal at Chesterfield in April.

He returned to Bristol City at the end of the season having played on the left side of midfield in ten consecutive games for Argyle. Bryan scored his first goal for City in the Bristol derby with Rovers in September, and his first league goal for the club came in November against Crawley Town. In June 2015 he signed a contract extension keeping him at Bristol City until 2019. The 2016–17 campaign saw Joe Bryan become statistically the best left back in the division.

Bryan starred in City's 2017–18 EFL Cup run to the semi-finals, scoring the third goal in a 4–1 win against Premier League side Crystal Palace and then going on to score the first goal in the club's 2–1 win against Manchester United in the 2017–18 EFL Cup quarter-final at Ashton Gate.

=== Fulham ===
On 9 August 2018, Bryan signed for newly promoted Premier League club Fulham for a transfer fee reported to be in the region of £6 million. He had already undergone a medical at then-Championship side Aston Villa, but received a phone call stating Fulham's offer had been accepted, he stated that he was "15, 20 minutes away from signing" for Villa but opted to join Fulham to play Premier League football. He scored his first goal for Fulham in an EFL Cup tie against Millwall on 25 September 2018. On 4 August 2020, Bryan scored twice in extra-time in the Championship play-off final at Wembley Stadium to send Fulham back up to the Premier League after a one-year absence, with the first goal being a long-range direct free kick.

==== Loan to Nice ====
On 31 August 2022, Bryan joined French club Nice on a season-long loan.

=== Millwall ===
On 1 July 2023, Bryan joined Millwall on a free transfer following the expiry of his contract at Fulham.

He was released upon the expiry of his contract at the end of the 2025–26 season., and announced his retirement from professional football in August.

== International career ==
Bryan was selected by the Scotland national under-21 football team in October 2012, but could not play due to a concussion he received playing for Bristol City against Leeds United. He remains eligible for Scotland through his parents but has not been selected for any squads subsequently.

== Personal life ==
Bryan's father, Alan, is a cardiac surgeon, specialising in aortic surgery. In 2017, Alan performed successful surgery on football manager Lee Johnson's father Gary. Coincidentally, Lee was managing Bristol City at that time, and Joe was one of his players. This sparked theories among fans that Joe was only picked into the team because his father saved his manager's father's life. However, he later denied these claims, saying "Hopefully, people will begin to see I'm quite good at football, perhaps."

His sister, Lucy, is a pole vaulter.

== Career statistics ==
As of end of 2025–26 season

Appearances and goals by club, season and competition
Club	Season	League			National cup (Note: Includes FA Cup, Coupe de France)		League cup		Other		Total	
Club	Season	Division	Apps	Goals	Apps	Goals	Apps	Goals	Apps	Goals	Apps	Goals
Bristol City	2011–12	Championship	1	0	0	0	0	0	—		1	0
Bristol City	2012–13	Championship	13	0	0	0	0	0	—		13	0
Bristol City	2013–14	League One	21	2	3	0	2	0	2 (Note: Appearances in Football League Trophy)	1	28	3
Bristol City	2014–15	League One	41	6	4	0	1	1	4	0	50	7
Bristol City	2015–16	Championship	39	2	1	0	0	0	—		40	2
Bristol City	2016–17	Championship	44	1	3	0	2	0	—		49	1
Bristol City	2017–18	Championship	43	5	0	0	5	2	—		48	7
Bristol City	2018–19	Championship	1	0	0	0	0	0	—		1	0
Bristol City	Total		203	16	11	0	10	3	6	1	230	20
Bath City (loan)	2011–12	Conference Premier	4	1	—		—		1 (Note: Appearance in the FA Trophy)	0	5	1
Plymouth Argyle (loan)	2012–13	League Two	10	1	—		—		—		10	1
Fulham	2018–19	Premier League	28	0	0	0	1	1	—		29	1
Fulham	2019–20	Championship	46	1	2	0	1	0	3 (Note: Appearances in Championship play-offs)	2	51	3
Fulham	2020–21	Premier League	16	1	2	0	1	0	—		19	1
Fulham	2021–22	Championship	15	1	2	0	2	0	—		19	1
Fulham	2022–23	Premier League	0	0	0	0	1	0	—		1	0
Fulham	Total		105	3	5	0	6	1	3	2	119	6
Nice (loan)	2022–23	Ligue 1	6	0	1	0	0	0	3 (Note: Appearances in UEFA Europa Conference League)	1	10	1
Millwall	2023–24	Championship	23	2	1	0	1	0	—		25	2
Millwall	2024–25	Championship	39	1	3	0	2	0	—		44	1
Millwall	2025–26	Championship	19	0	1	0	1	0	—		21	0
Millwall	Total		81	3	5	0	4	0	—		90	3
Career total			409	24	22	0	20	4	13	4	464	32

== Honours ==
Bristol City

- Football League One: 2014–15
- Football League Trophy: 2014–15

Fulham

- EFL Championship: 2021–22; play-offs: 2020

Individual

- PFA Team of the Year: 2014–15 League One, 2019–20 Championship
- Football League Young Player of the Month: February 2015
