= Wes Burns =

Welsh footballer

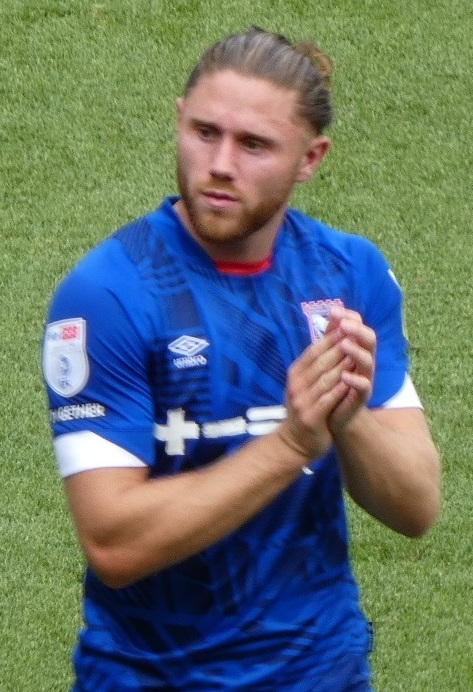
- Burns with Ipswich Town in 2022

Personal information
- Full name: Wesley James Burns
- Date of birth: 23 November 1994 (age 31)
- Place of birth: Cardiff, Wales
- Height: 1.73 m (5 ft 8 in)
- Position: Right winger

Team information
- Current team: Leicester City
- Number: 7

Youth career
- Cardiff City
- 2009–2012: Bristol City

Senior career*
Years	Team	Apps	(Gls)
2012–2017	Bristol City	44	(3)
2012–2013	→ Forest Green Rovers (loan)	6	(1)
2014–2015	→ Oxford United (loan)	9	(1)
2015	→ Cheltenham Town (loan)	14	(4)
2016	→ Fleetwood Town (loan)	14	(5)
2016–2017	→ Aberdeen (loan)	13	(0)
2017–2021	Fleetwood Town	144	(16)
2021–2026	Ipswich Town	150	(28)
2026–	Leicester City	7	(1)

International career^{‡}
2013–2016	Wales U21	18	(6)
2022–	Wales	12	(0)
- * Club domestic league appearances and goals as of 13:45, 25 September 2026 (UTC) ‡ National team caps and goals as of 21:09, 4 October 2026 (UTC)

Wesley James Burns (born 23 November 1994) is a Welsh professional footballer who plays as a right winger for EFL League One club Leicester City and the Wales national team.

Born in Cardiff, Burns started his career at Bristol City, progressing through the club's academy to make his debut in January 2013. During his time at Bristol City he spent time out on loan at Forest Green Rovers, Oxford United, Cheltenham Town, Fleetwood Town and Aberdeen, before joining Fleetwood Town permanently in January 2017. He spent five years at Fleetwood Town, making over one hundred and fifty appearances. He joined Ipswich Town in June 2021. In his first season with the Tractor Boys, Burns earned him a spot in the EFL League One Team of the Season with 12 goals and 6 assists. Burns helped Ipswich to promotion in 2022–23, with 8 goals and 11 assists for the season.

Burns represented the Wales U21 national team between 2013 and 2016. Having previously been called up to the senior Wales squad in 2015 and 2016, he made his international debut for Wales against Poland in the Nations League in June 2022.

== Club career ==
=== Bristol City ===
Burns started his youth career at Cardiff City, but failed to earn an under-16 contract. He was swiftly picked up by Bristol City, which kick-started a rapid rise through their youth team. He signed his first professional contract on 18 December 2012 on a two-and-a-half-year deal, and made his professional debut coming on as a substitute against Leeds United on 19 January 2013.

After his loan spell at Forest Green Rovers came to an end, Burns went on to feature straight away in Bristol City's 1–0 defeat to Birmingham City which confirmed their relegation. Burns then spent the first half of the 2013–14 season on the bench and made his first appearance in the first round against Dagenham & Redbridge, assisting a goal for Jay Emmanuel-Thomas, who scored his second, in a 2–0 win. Burns began to appear in the first team under the management of Steve Cotterill and scored his first Bristol City goal on 4 February 2014, in a 2–1 loss against Coventry City. Burns went on to make twenty appearances, most of which were on the bench, and at the end of the 2013–14 season, Burns was rewarded with a contract extension.

The 2014–15 season saw Burns struggled in the first team, as he was demoted to the substitute bench. Burns scored his first Bristol City goal on 8 October 2014, in a second round of Football League Cup, in a 3–1 win over Cheltenham Town and three days later, Burns scored a winning goal against Chesterfield, which resulted a 3–2 win for Bristol City. After the match, Burns describe this as his best moment of his career. However, Burns suffered ankle injury in mid-November. Just one day after playing for Cheltenham Town in the last game of the season, Burns made his return to Bristol City in the last game of the season, in an 8–2 win over Walsall.

Ahead of the 2015–16 season, Burns expressed determination in hopes of regaining his first team place at Bristol City, with Manager Cotterill was keen to use him in the first team and has no plan of loaning out Burns. However, Burns struggled to regain his first team place, as well as, his struggle to score goals. Nevertheless, Burns scored his first goal of the season on 16 January 2016, in a 1–0 win over Middlesbrough, ending three games without a point. By the time he went out on loan, Burns made fourteen appearances and scoring once. On 13 April 2016, Burns signed a contract extension with the club, keeping him until 2017. Three months later, Burns signed a further contract extension with the club, keeping him for two years.

=== Loan spells ===
On 12 March 2013 he joined Conference side Forest Green Rovers on loan. He scored the winning goal for Forest Green on his debut later that evening against Southport, finding the back of the net in dramatic style in second half stoppage time. He was recalled by Bristol City on 16 April 2013 and was forced to cut his loan short.

On 27 November 2014, Burns was loaned to League Two club Oxford United until the end of the 2014–15 season. It wasn't until on 13 December 2014 for Burns made his Oxford United debut, playing 90 minutes, and set up one of the goals in a 2–1 win over Bury. On 3 January 2013, Burns scored his first Oxford United goal, in a 2–1 loss against Cheltenham Town on 3 January 2015. After his loan ended prematurely on 2 February 2015 By the time he left Oxford United, Burns made nine appearances (three as a substitute) and scored once.

Shortly after leaving Oxford United, Burns was reported to be joining Cheltenham Town on loan until the end of the season. Burns then scored on his debut on 7 February 2015, in a 3–1 loss against Burton Albion and scored his second goal two weeks against Accrington Stanley. Burns then scored two goals in two matches between 7 March 2015 and 13 March 2015 against Mansfield Town and Newport County. Despite suffering ankle injury that kept him out for two matches, Burns played the last two matches for the club, but was unable to help the club, as they were relegated to the National League and returned to his parent club.

On 16 February 2016, Burns joined League One side Fleetwood Town on loan for the remainder of the 2015–16 campaign. New Bristol City Manager Lee Johnson explained his decision to loan out Burns as beneficial on long-term plan. Burns made his Fleetwood Town on 20 February 2016, where he played 15 minutes, in a 2–1 win over Scunthorpe United. Burns scored his first Fleetwood Town goal on 27 February 2016, in a 2–1 win over Coventry City, followed up scoring in the next games, in a 2–1 win over Gillingham. Burns went on to score three more goals against Burton Albion, Swindon Town and Petebrough United. Burns went on to make fourteen appearances and scoring five times for the club, as he helped the club survive relegation in League One.

On 14 July 2016, Burns was loaned to Scottish Premiership side Aberdeen on loan until the end of the 2016–17 season. He made his debut the same day, scoring with his first touch after coming on as an 89th-minute substitute in a 3–0 win against Ventspils in a Europa League Second qualifying round first leg tie. He returned to Bristol City in January 2017.

=== Fleetwood Town ===
On 19 January 2017, Burns returned to Fleetwood Town for an undisclosed fee on a three-and-a-half-year deal, after being on loan at the club earlier in 2016. He made his permanent debut for Fleetwood in a 1–0 win against Coventry City on 21 January. He went on to make 12 appearances during the second-half of the 2016–17 season, helping Fleetwood to reach the League One play-offs.

He became a regular in the first-team during the 2017–18 season. He scored his first goal of the season on 29 August in a 3–0 win in an EFL Trophy group stage match against Leicester U21s. He scored his first league goal of the season on 31 October, netting a late equalizer in a 2–2 draw with Blackburn Rovers. Burns made 38 appearances in all competitions during his first full season at Fleetwood, scoring 5 goals.

Burns scored his first goals of the 2018–19 season on 22 August, scoring a brace in a 5–0 away win against Scunthorpe United. He was a regular started for Fleetwood during the season, showing his versatility as a player by featuring in multiple positions. Fleetwood right-back Lewie Coyle saw Joey Barton convert him into a central midfielder and left back over the second half of the season, so Burns could be converted to playing into Coyle's usual right-back role. In April 2019, Burns signed a new contract with Fleetwood Town, keeping him under contract until the summer of 2021, with the option to extend the deal by an additional year. He made 44 appearances during the 2018–19 season, scoring 8 goals. His performances over the course of the season earned him Fleetwood's Player of the Year award, as well as winning the club's Goal of the Season award for his strike in a 3–2 win against Fleetwood's local rivals Blackpool on 27 October.

He continued to feature regularly for Fleetwood during the 2019–20 season, playing primarily as a right winger. He scored his first goal of the season on 13 November in a 5–2 win against Oldham Athletic in an EFL Trophy tie. Burns features 43 times for Fleetwood over the course of the season, scoring 4 times, including netting late winners against Rochdale and Peterborough United. He helped Fleetwood reach the League One play-offs for the second time since signing permanently for the club.

Burns played primarily as a right wing-back during the 2020–21 season. He scored his first goal of the season in a 5–1 win against Plymouth Argyle on 21 November. He scored 6 goals in 39 appearances for Fleetwood over the course of the 2020–21 season. Fleetwood triggered the option to extend Burns's contract by an additional year in May 2021.

=== Ipswich Town ===
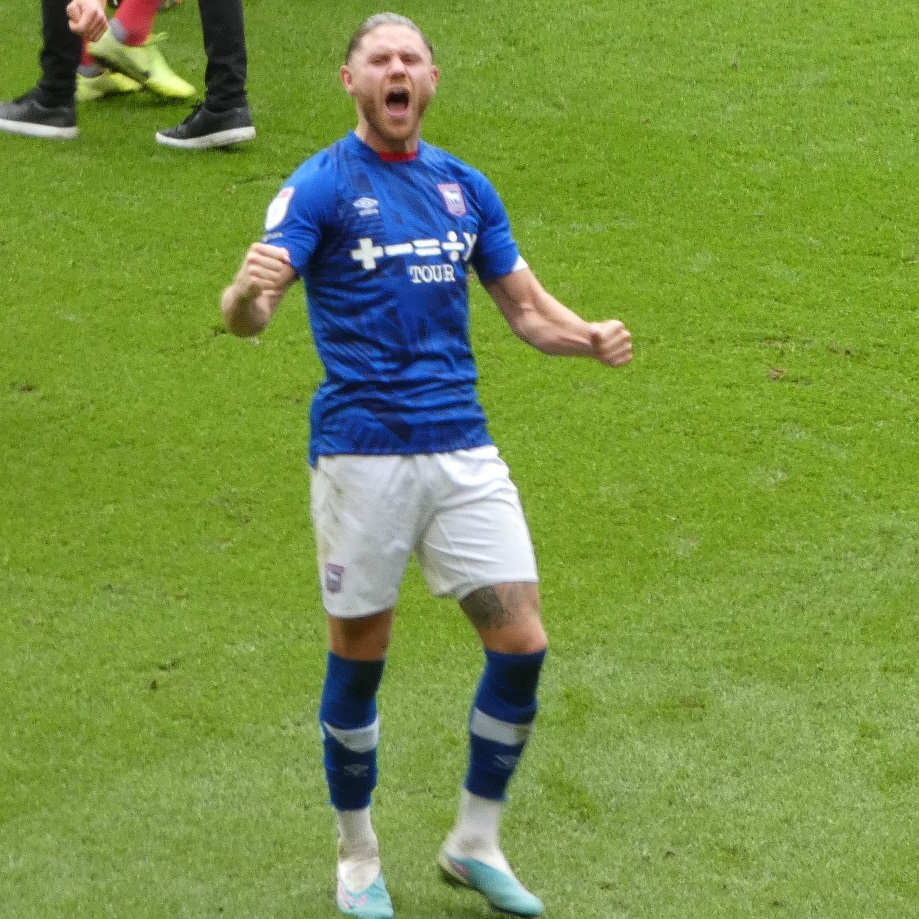
Wes Burns joined Ipswich in 2021 and was a key member of the team that won back-to-back promotions in 2023 and 2024

On 3 June 2021, Burns joined fellow League One side Ipswich Town for an undisclosed fee. He signed a three-year deal with the club. He made his debut for the club on the opening day of the 2021–22 season against Morecambe at Portman Road. Burns scored his first goal for Ipswich in a 2–2 draw against AFC Wimbledon on 28 August. He quickly established himself as a key part of the Ipswich team, initially playing as a winger under Paul Cook before switching to a wing-back role following the arrival of new manager Kieran McKenna in December. A four goal return in January earned him the PFA League One Player of the Month award for the month. Burns enjoyed a highly successful first season at the club, finishing as the club's top goalscorer with 13 goals, as well as providing 6 assists. He was subsequently voted as the club's 2021–22 Player of the Season and was included in EFL League One Team of the Season. On 16 May 2022, Burns signed a new long-term contract, keeping him at the club until 2025, just one year into his initial three-year deal. In a 2–1 victory against Coventry City, Burns scored a goal with the outside of his boot which would later be voted as the EFL Goal of the Season for the 2023–24 season.

=== Leicester City ===
On 6 August 2026, Burns joined newly relegated EFL League One side Leicester City.

== International career ==
In January 2013 Burns, aged 18, was named in the Wales Under-21 squad versus Iceland on 6 February 2013. He made his debut as a second-half substitute and scored the first goal in the 3–0 win. He earned his second under-21s cap in a win over Moldova on 22 March 2013.

On 6 October 2015, Burns received his first call up to the senior Wales side for UEFA Euro 2016 qualifiers against Bosnia and Herzegovina and Andorra as a replacement for the injured David Cotterill. In May 2016, Burns was among twenty-nine players to be called for the club's training squad ahead of UEFA Euro 2016. However, Burns didn't make it to the 23 man squad for the UEFA Euro 2016. Despite this, Burns said he would follow Wales matches in the UEFA Euro 2016.

In May 2022, Burns was called up to the Wales squad for UEFA Nations League games and the 2022 FIFA World Cup qualification play-off final against Ukraine in June. He made his international debut against Poland in the Nations League on 1 June 2022, somewhat surprisingly at left wing back.

== Personal life ==
Educated at Ysgol Gyfun Bro Morgannwg in Barry, Burns is a fluent Welsh language speaker.

== Career statistics ==
=== Club ===
As of match played 15 August 2026

Appearances and goals by club, season and competition
Club	Season	League			National cup (Note: Includes FA Cup)		League cup (Note: Includes EFL Cup, Scottish League Cup)		Other		Total	
Club	Season	Division	Apps	Goals	Apps	Goals	Apps	Goals	Apps	Goals	Apps	Goals
Bristol City	2012–13	Championship	7	0	0	0	0	0	—		7	0
Bristol City	2013–14	League One	20	1	3	0	0	0	0	0	23	1
Bristol City	2014–15	League One	3	1	1	0	1	0	2 (Note: Appearances in Football League Trophy)	1	7	2
Bristol City	2015–16	Championship	14	1	2	0	1	0	—		17	1
Bristol City	2016–17	Championship	0	0	0	0	0	0	—		0	0
Bristol City	Total		44	3	6	0	2	0	2	1	54	4
Forest Green Rovers (loan)	2012–13	Conference Premier	6	1	0	0	—		0	0	6	1
Oxford United (loan)	2014–15	League Two	9	1	—		—		—		9	1
Cheltenham Town (loan)	2014–15	League Two	14	4	—		—		—		14	4
Fleetwood Town (loan)	2015–16	League One	14	5	—		—		—		14	5
Aberdeen (loan)	2016–17	Scottish Premiership	13	0	0	0	4	0	4 (Note: Appearances in UEFA Europa League)	1	21	1
Fleetwood Town	2016–17	League One	10	0	0	0	0	0	2 (Note: Appearances in EFL League One play-offs)	0	12	0
Fleetwood Town	2017–18	League One	28	2	5	0	1	0	4 (Note: Appearance(s) in EFL Trophy)	3	38	5
Fleetwood Town	2018–19	League One	39	7	3	1	1	0	1	0	44	8
Fleetwood Town	2019–20	League One	34	2	3	0	1	0	5 (Note: Three appearances and two goals in EFL Trophy, two appearances in EFL League One play-offs)	2	43	4
Fleetwood Town	2020–21	League One	33	5	1	0	3	0	2	1	39	6
Fleetwood Town	Total		144	16	12	1	6	0	14	6	176	23
Ipswich Town	2021–22	League One	37	12	2	1	0	0	1	0	40	13
Ipswich Town	2022–23	League One	42	8	3	1	1	0	2	0	48	9
Ipswich Town	2023–24	Championship	35	6	2	0	1	0	—		38	6
Ipswich Town	2024–25	Premier League	18	0	1	0	0	0	—		19	0
Ipswich Town	2025–26	Championship	18	2	1	0	0	0	—		19	2
Ipswich Town	Total		150	28	9	2	2	0	3	0	164	30
Leicester City	2026–27	League One	1	0	0	0	1	0	0	0	2	0
Career total			393	58	27	3	15	0	23	8	458	69

=== International ===
As of match played 4 October 2026

Appearances and goals by national team and year
National team	Year	Apps	Goals
Wales	2022	3	0
Wales	2023	3	0
Wales	2024	4	0
Wales	2025	0	0
Wales	2026	2	0
Total		12	0

== Honours ==
Bristol City

- Football League Trophy: 2014–15

Aberdeen

- Scottish League Cup runner-up: 2016–17

Ipswich Town

- EFL League One runner-up: 2022–23
- EFL Championship runner-up: 2023–24, 2025–26

Individual

- Fleetwood Town Player of the Year: 2018–19
- Fleetwood Town Goal of the Season: 2018–19
- PFA Fans' League One Player of the Month: January 2022
- EFL League One Team of the Season: 2021–22
- Ipswich Town Players' Player of the Year: 2021–22
- Ipswich Town Player of the Year: 2021–22
- Ipswich Town Goal of the Year: 2023–24
- EFL Championship Goal of the Month: December 2023
- EFL Goal of the Season: 2023–24
