= 2013–14 Bristol City F.C. season =

Bristol City
2013–14 season
- Chairman: Keith Dawe
- Manager: Sean O'Driscoll (Until 28 November); John Pemberton (caretaker) (From 28 November 2016); Steve Cotterill (From 3 December)
- Stadium: Ashton Gate Stadium
- League One: 12th
- FA Cup: Third round
- League Cup: Third round
- Football League Trophy: Second round
- Top goalscorer: League: Sam Baldock (24); All: Sam Baldock (26)
- Highest home attendance: 17,888 vs Bristol Rovers (Football League Trophy, 4 September 2013)
- Lowest home attendance: 3,763 vs Dagenham & Redbridge (FA Cup, 9 November 2013)
- Average home league attendance: 10,699
Home colours	Away colours

The 2013–14 season was Bristol City's 116th season as a professional football club. It was the first season since 2006–07 that City had played in the third tier of English football, League One, following their relegation from the Championship the previous season.

Sean O'Driscoll, who had overseen City's relegation, remained in charge at Ashton Gate in the early months of the season, until he was sacked and replaced by Steve Cotterill in November 2013.

== League One data ==
=== League table ===
Pos	Team	Pld	W	D	L	GF	GA	GD	Pts
10	Milton Keynes Dons	46	17	9	20	63	65	−2	60
11	Bradford City	46	14	17	15	57	54	+3	59
12	Bristol City	46	13	19	14	70	67	+3	58
13	Walsall	46	14	16	16	49	49	0	58
14	Crawley Town	46	14	15	17	48	54	−6	57

Updated to match(es) played on 3 May 2014. Source: BBC Sport
Rules for classification: 1) Points; 2) Goal difference; 3) Number of goals scored

=== Result summary ===
Overall								Home						Away					
Pld	W	D	L	GF	GA	GD	Pts	W	D	L	GF	GA	GD	W	D	L	GF	GA	GD
46	13	19	14	70	67	+3	58	7	10	6	34	28	+6	6	9	8	36	39	−3

Last updated: 3 May 2014.
Source: BBC

=== Results by round ===
Round	1	2	3	4	5	6	7	8	9	10	11	12	13	14	15	16	17	18	19	20	21	22	23	24	25	26	27	28	29	30	31	32	33	34	35	36	37	38	39	40	41	42	43	44	45	46
Ground	H	A	H	A	A	H	H	A	H	A	A	H	A	H	H	A	H	H	A	H	A	H	H	A	H	A	A	H	H	A	A	H	A	H	A	A	H	A	H	A	H	A	H	A	H	A
Result	D	L	L	D	D	L	D	L	D	D	L	L	W	D	W	D	L	D	L	L	D	W	W	D	D	L	L	W	L	D	W	D	L	W	W	W	D	D	W	L	D	W	W	W	D	D
Position	11	15	18	19	20	21	21	21	19	20	24	24	23	23	20	19	22	22	23	24	24	21	21	23	22	23	23	20	20	22	17	17	21	20	17	15	15	15	13	15	15	13	14	12	12	12

Updated to match(es) played on 3 May 2014. Source:
A = Away; H = Home; W = Win; D = Draw; L = Loss

== Kits ==
Supplier: adidas
Sponsor(s): Blackthorn

Home	Away

Last updated: 7 July 2013.
Source: Historic Football Kits – League One 2013–14

== Squad ==
No.	Name	Position (s)	Nationality	Place of Birth	Date of Birth (Age)	Club caps	Club goals	Int. caps	Int. goals	Date signed	Signed from	Fee	Contract End
Goalkeepers
1	Frank Fielding	GK	(England)	Blackburn	4 April 1988 (aged 26)	–	–	–	–	26 June 2013	Derby County	£200,000	30 June 2016
13	Elliot Parish	GK	(England)	Towcester	20 May 1990 (aged 24)	–	–	–	–	24 July 2013	Cardiff City	Free	30 June 2015
30	Simon Moore	GK	(England)	Sandown	19 May 1990 (aged 24)	–	–	–	–	30 January 2014	Cardiff City	Loan	31 May 2014
32	Dave Richards	GK	(Wales)	Abergavenny	31 December 1993 (aged 20)	–	–	–	–	1 January 2014	Cardiff City	Free	30 June 2015
Defenders
2	Brendan Moloney	RB/CB/LB	(Republic of Ireland)	Killarney	18 January 1989 (aged 25)	17	0	–	–	25 January 2013	Nottingham Forest	Free	30 June 2015
3	Derrick Williams	LB	(Republic of Ireland)		17 January 1993 (aged 21)	–	–	–	–	24 June 2013	Aston Villa	Free	30 June 2016
4	Liam Fontaine	CB/LB	(England)	London	7 January 1986 (aged 28)	287	7	–	–	12 June 2006	Fulham	£200,000	30 June 2014
5	Aden Flint	CB	(England)	Pinxton	11 July 1989 (aged 24)	–	–	–	–	11 June 2013	Swindon Town	£300,000	30 June 2017
6	Louis Carey	CB/RB	(Scotland)	Bristol (England)	22 January 1977 (aged 37)	646	15	–	–	31 January 2005	Coventry City	Free	30 June 2014
17	Greg Cunningham	LB/LM	(Republic of Ireland)	Carnmore	31 January 1991 (aged 23)	31	1	3	0	5 July 2012	Manchester City	Undisclosed	30 June 2016
18	Adam El-Abd	CB	(Egypt)	Brighton (England)	11 September 1984 (aged 29)	–	–	7	0	16 January 2014	Brighton & Hove Albion	Undisclosed	30 June 2017
35	Karleigh Osborne	CB	(England)	Southall	19 March 1988 (aged 26)	–	–	–	–	7 January 2014	Millwall	Undisclosed	30 June 2016
36	Nyron Nosworthy	CB	(Jamaica)	Brixton (England)	11 October 1980 (aged 33)	–	–	10	1	14 March 2014	Watford	Loan	April 2014
Midfielders
7	Liam Kelly	CM/DM/RM	(Scotland)	Milton Keynes (England)	10 February 1990 (aged 24)	19	0	1	0	11 January 2013	Kilmarnock	£220,000	30 June 2016
8	Wade Elliott	LW/CM	(England)	Eastleigh	14 December 1978 (aged 35)	–	–	–	–	28 January 2014	Birmingham City	Loan	1 March 2014
11	Scott Wagstaff	RM	(England)	Maidstone	31 March 1990 (aged 24)	–	–	–	–	8 July 2013	Charlton Athletic	Free	30 June 2016
14	Bobby Reid	CM/AM	(England)	Bristol	2 February 1993 (aged 21)	6	1	–	–	29 April 2011	Academy	Trainee	Undisclosed
15	Joe Bryan	LM/LB	(England)	Bristol	17 September 1993 (aged 20)	13	0	–	–	1 August 2011	Academy	Trainee	30 June 2015
16	Jordan Wynter	DM	(England)	London	19 January 1994 (aged 20)	–	–	–	–	22 May 2013	Arsenal	Free	30 June 2015
19	Stephen Pearson	LM/CM/AM	(Scotland)	Lanark	2 October 1982 (aged 31)	68	6	10	0	6 January 2012	Derby County	Free	30 June 2014
21	Marlon Pack	RM/CM	(England)	Portsmouth	25 March 1991 (aged 23)	–	–	–	–	2 August 2013	Cheltenham Town	£100,000	30 June 2015
25	Marvin Elliott	DM/CM	(Jamaica)	London (England)	15 September 1984 (aged 29)	232	21	6	1	30 July 2007	Millwall	£440,000	30 June 2014
31	Joe Morrell	MF	(Wales)	Ipswich (England)	3 January 1994 (aged 20)	–	–	–	–	3 January 2014	Academy	Trainee	30 June 2016
34	Simon Gillett	CM	(England)	Oxford	6 November 1985 (aged 28)	–	–	–	–	31 September 2013	Nottingham Forest	Loan	31 May 2014
Forwards
9	Sam Baldock	ST/RW	(England)	Buckingham	15 March 1989 (aged 25)	34	10	–	–	21 August 2012	West Ham United	£1,100,000	30 June 2015
10	Jay Emmanuel-Thomas	RW/CF/SS	(England)	London	27 December 1990 (aged 23)	–	–	–	–	8 July 2013	Ipswich Town	Swap Deal	30 June 2015
23	Tyrone Barnett	CF	(England)	Stevenage	28 October 1985 (aged 28)	–	–	–	–	8 January 2014	Peterborough United	Loan	31 May 2014
24	Martin Paterson	CF	(Northern Ireland)	Tunstall (England)	10 May 1987 (aged 27)	–	–	22	3	15 March 2014	Huddersfield Town	Loan	31 May 2014
27	Wesley Burns	ST/RW/CM	(Wales)	Cardiff	28 October 1994 (aged 19)	7	0	–	–	18 December 2012	Academy	Trainee	30 June 2014

=== Statistics ===
As of 3 May 2014

No.	Pos	Nat	Player	Total		League One		FA Cup		League Cup		League Trophy	
No.	Pos	Nat	Player	Apps	Goals	Apps	Goals	Apps	Goals	Apps	Goals	Apps	Goals
1	GK	(England) ENG	Frank Fielding	18	0	16	0	0	0	1	0	1	0
2	DF	(Republic of Ireland) IRL	Brendan Moloney	41	1	27+5	0	3+1	0	3	0	2	1
3	DF	(Republic of Ireland) IRL	Derrick Williams	48	1	40+3	1	2	0	2+1	0	0	0
4	DF	(England) ENG	Liam Fontaine	7	0	2+1	0	2	0	1+1	0	0	0
5	DF	(England) ENG	Aden Flint	43	3	32+2	3	4	0	3	0	2	0
6	DF	(Scotland) SCO	Louis Carey	3	0	1+1	0	0+1	0	0	0	0	0
7	MF	(Scotland) SCO	Liam Kelly	2	0	0+2	0	0	0	0	0	0	0
8	MF	(England) ENG	Wade Elliott (on loan from Birmingham City)	19	3	17+2	3	0	0	0	0	0	0
9	FW	(England) ENG	Sam Baldock	53	26	44+1	24	4	1	2+1	1	0+1	0
10	FW	(England) ENG	Jay Emmanuel-Thomas	55	21	42+4	15	4	4	3	1	1+1	1
11	MF	(England) ENG	Scott Wagstaff	45	6	35+2	5	3+1	0	2	1	2	0
14	MF	(England) ENG	Bobby Reid	32	1	19+5	1	3	0	2+1	0	1+1	0
15	MF	(England) ENG	Joe Bryan	28	3	11+10	2	3	0	2	0	2	1
16	MF	(England) ENG	Jordan Wynter	5	1	2+1	0	0+1	0	1	1	0	0
17	DF	(Republic of Ireland) IRL	Greg Cunningham	44	1	32+5	1	2+2	0	2	0	1	0
18	DF	(Egypt) EGY	Adam El-Abd	14	0	13+1	0	0	0	0	0	0	0
19	MF	(Scotland) SCO	Stephen Pearson	6	1	2+4	1	0	0	0	0	0	0
21	MF	(England) ENG	Marlon Pack	52	0	34+9	0	3+1	0	2+1	0	2	0
23	FW	(England) ENG	Tyrone Barnett (on loan from Peterborough United)	17	1	7+10	1	0	0	0	0	0	0
24	FW	(Northern Ireland) NIR	Martin Paterson (on loan from Huddersfield Town)	8	1	6+2	1	0	0	0	0	0	0
25	MF	(Jamaica) JAM	Marvin Elliott	30	5	16+8	4	3+1	1	2	0	0	0
27	FW	(Wales) WAL	Wesley Burns	23	1	1+19	1	0+3	0	0	0	0	0
30	GK	(England) ENG	Simon Moore (on loan from Cardiff City)	11	0	11	0	0	0	0	0	0	0
31	FW	(England) ENG	Joe Morrell	1	0	0	0	0	0	0	0	1	0
34	MF	(England) ENG	Simon Gillett (on loan from Nottingham Forest)	23	2	21+2	2	0	0	0	0	0	0
35	DF	(England) ENG	Karleigh Osborne	29	1	25+2	1	2	0	0	0	0	0
36	DF	(Jamaica) JAM	Nyron Nosworthy (on loan from Watford)	10	1	10	1	0	0	0	0	0	0
Players currently out on loan:
13	GK	(England) ENG	Elliot Parish (at Newport County)	26	0	19	0	4	0	2	0	1	0
Players who left the club:
8	MF	(Australia) AUS	Neil Kilkenny	5	0	3	0	0	0	1+1	0	0	0
18	FW	(England) ENG	Ryan Taylor	7	0	2+4	0	1	0	0	0	0	0
22	DF	(England) ENG	Nicky Shorey	17	0	11+3	0	1	0	1	0	1	0
23	FW	(England) ENG	Marlon Harewood	17	1	0+12	1	0	0	0+3	0	2	0
24	DF	(England) ENG	James O'Connor (on loan from Derby County	4	0	3	0	0	0	0	0	1	0
28	MF	(Republic of Ireland) IRL	Stephen McLaughlin (on loan from Nottingham Forest)	7	0	0+5	0	0	0	1	0	1	0
30	DF	(England) ENG	Lewis Dunk (on loan from Brighton & Hove Albion)	3	0	2	0	0	0	0	0	1	0

=== Captains ===
No.	P	Name	Country	No. games	Notes
9	FW	Sam Baldock	(England)	52	
23	FW	Marlon Harewood	(England)	2	
25	MF	Marvin Elliott	(Jamaica)	2	
5	DF	Aden Flint	(England)	1	

Last updated: 6 November 2013
Source: Competitive match reports.
Competitive matches only
Matches started as captain only
Country: FIFA nationality; No.: Squad number; P: Position; Name: Player name; No. Games: Number of games started as captain.

=== Goalscorers ===
Rank	No.	Pos.	Name	League One	FA Cup	League Cup	League Trophy	Total
1	9	FW	Sam Baldock	24	1	1	0	26
2	10	FW	Jay Emmanuel-Thomas	15	5	1	1	21
3	11	MF	Scott Wagstaff	5	0	1	0	6
4	25	MF	Marvin Elliott	4	1	0	0	5
5	5	DF	Aden Flint	3	0	0	0	3
5	8	MF	Wade Elliott	3	0	0	0	3
5	15	MF	Joe Bryan	2	0	0	1	3
8	34	MF	Simon Gillett	2	0	0	0	2
9	2	DF	Brendan Maloney	0	0	0	1	1
9	3	DF	Derrick Williams	1	0	0	0	1
9	14	MF	Bobby Reid	1	0	0	0	1
9	16	MF	Jordan Wynter	0	0	1	0	1
9	17	DF	Greg Cunningham	1	0	0	0	1
9	19	MF	Stephen Pearson	1	0	0	0	1
9	~~23~~	FW	Marlon Harewood	1	0	0	0	1
9	23	FW	Tyrone Barnett	1	0	0	0	1
9	24	FW	Martin Paterson	1	0	0	0	1
9	27	FW	Wesley Burns	1	0	0	0	1
9	35	DF	Karleigh Osborne	1	0	0	0	1
9	36	DF	Nyron Nosworthy	1	0	0	0	1
Total				70	7	4	3	84

=== Disciplinary record ===
No.	Pos.	Name	League One		FA Cup		League Cup		League Trophy		Total	
No.	Pos.	Name	Yellow card	Red card	Yellow card	Red card	Yellow card	Red card	Yellow card	Red card	Yellow card	Red card
1	GK	Frank Fielding	0	0	1	0	0	0	0	0	1	0
2	DF	Brendan Moloney	5	0	0	0	0	0	0	0	5	0
3	DF	Derrick Williams	7	0	0	0	0	0	0	0	7	0
5	DF	Aden Flint	4	0	0	0	1	0	0	0	5	0
6	DF	Louis Carey	1	0	0	0	0	0	0	0	1	0
8	MF	Wade Elliott	5	0	0	0	0	0	0	0	5	0
10	FW	Jay Emmanuel-Thomas	2	0	0	0	0	0	0	0	2	0
11	MF	Scott Wagstaff	4	0	1	0	0	0	0	0	5	0
13	GK	Elliott Parish	0	0	1	0	0	0	0	0	1	0
14	MF	Bobby Reid	2	0	0	0	0	0	0	0	2	0
15	MF	Joe Bryan	2	0	0	0	1	0	0	0	3	0
17	DF	Greg Cunningham	5	0	0	0	0	0	1	0	6	0
18	DF	Adam El-Abd	3	1	0	0	0	0	0	0	3	1
21	MF	Marlon Pack	5	0	0	0	0	0	1	0	6	0
~~22~~	DF	Nicky Shorey	1	0	0	0	0	0	0	0	1	0
~~24~~	DF	James O'Connor	0	0	0	0	0	0	1	0	1	0
25	MF	Marvin Elliott	2	0	0	0	0	0	0	0	2	0
27	FW	Wes Burns	1	0	0	0	0	0	0	0	1	0
~~28~~	MF	Stephen McLaughlin	0	0	0	0	0	0	1	0	1	0
~~30~~	DF	Lewis Dunk	0	0	0	0	0	0	1	0	1	0
30	GK	Simon Moore	1	0	0	0	0	0	0	0	1	0
34	MF	Simon Gillett	9	0	0	0	0	0	0	0	9	0
35	DF	Karleigh Osborne	2	1	0	0	0	0	0	0	2	1
Total			60	2	3	0	2	0	5	0	72	2

==== Suspensions served ====
Date	Matches Missed	Player	Reason	Opponents Missed
30 November	3	Karleigh Osborne	(red card) vs Preston North End	Tamworth (FA), Rotherham (H), Notts County (A)
21 December	1	Brendan Maloney	5× (yellow card)	Walsall (H)
26 December	1	Marlon Pack	5× (yellow card)	Stevenage (H)
11 March	3	Adam El-Abd	(red card) vs Peterborough United	Swindon (H)

=== Contracts ===
No.	Pos.	Nat.	Name	Age	Status	Contract length	Expiry date	Source
6	DF	(Scotland) (England)	Louis Carey	36	Signed	1 year	June 2014	
1	GK	(England)	Tom Heaton	27	Rejected	Rejected	June 2013	
5	DF	(Wales) (England)	Lewin Nyatanga	24	Rejected	Rejected	June 2013	

== Transfers ==
=== In ===
No.	Pos.	Nat.	Name	Age	EU	Moving from	Type	Transfer window	Ends	Transfer fee	Source
16	MF	(England)	Jordan Wynter	19	EU	Arsenal	Free transfer	Summer	2015	Free	
5	DF	(England)	Aden Flint	23	EU	Swindon Town	Transfer	Summer	2017	£300,000	
3	DF	(Republic of Ireland)	Derrick Williams	20	EU	Aston Villa	Free transfer	Summer	2016	Free	
1	GK	(England)	Frank Fielding	25	EU	Derby County	Transfer	Summer	2016	£200,000	
10	FW	(England)	Jay Emmanuel-Thomas	22	EU	Ipswich Town	Player Swap	Summer	2015	—^{1}	
11	MF	(England)	Scott Wagstaff	23	EU	Charlton Athletic	Free transfer	Summer	2016	Free	
13	GK	(England)	Elliot Parish	23	EU	Cardiff City (Wales)	Free transfer	Summer	2015	Free	
23	FW	(England)	Marlon Harewood	33	EU	Barnsley	Free transfer	Summer	2014	Free	
21	MF	(England)	Marlon Pack	22	EU	Cheltenham Town	Bosman Transfer	Summer	2015	£100,000	
22	DF	(England)	Nicky Shorey	32	EU	Reading	Free transfer	Summer	2013	Free	
32	GK	(Wales)	Dave Richards	20	EU	Cardiff City (Wales)	Free transfer	Winter	2014	Free	
31	MF	(Wales) (England)	Joe Morrell	17	EU	Bristol City (Youth)	Promoted	Winter	2016	Free	
35	DF	(England)	Karleigh Osborne	25	EU	Millwall	Transfer	Winter	2016	Undisclosed	
18	DF	(Egypt) (England)	Adam El-Abd	29	EU	Brighton & Hove Albion	Transfer	Winter	2017	Undisclosed	
23	FW	(England)	Tyrone Barnett	28	EU	Peterborough United	Loan	Winter	2014	Season Long Loan	

- Total spending: ▼ ~ £600,000+

Notes

^{1} The player swap included Jay Emmanuel-Thomas coming into the club and Paul Anderson leaving for Ipswich Town.

=== Loans in ===
No.	Pos.	Name	Country	Age	Loan club	Started	Ended	Start source	End source
24	DF	James O'Connor	(England)	29	Derby County	2 September	7 January		
28	MF	Stephen McLaughlin	(Republic of Ireland)	23	Nottingham Forest	2 September	2 January		
30	DF	Lewis Dunk	(England)	21	Brighton & Hove Albion	4 October	4 November		
32	GK	Dave Richards	(Wales)	20	Cardiff City	25 October	1 January		
35	DF	Karleigh Osborne	(England)	25	Millwall	1 November	5 January		
8	MF	Wade Elliott	(England)	35	Birmingham City	28 January	31 May		
30	GK	Simon Moore	(England)	24	Cardiff City	30 January	31 May		
36	DF	Nyron Nosworthy	(Jamaica) (England)	33	Watford	14 March	31 May		
24	FW	Martin Paterson	(Northern Ireland)	27	Huddersfield Town	15 March	31 May		

Sources: For loan start source see "Start source". For loan end source see "End source".
EU = if holds or not a European Union passport; Country: when 2 flags, 1st flag = country that plays for internationally, 2nd flag = country of birth; No. = number on jersey; P = Position (for position name, pause mouse pointer on abbreviation); Name = Name on jersey (for more extensive name, pause mouse pointer on name); In/Out = In: The player came in on loan, Out: The player went out on loan; Loan club = the club that the player moved on loan to or the club that the player came from on loan; Started = the date when the player's loan started; Ended = the date when the player's loan ended.

=== Out ===
No.	Pos.	Name	Country	Age	Type	Moving to	Transfer window	Transfer fee	Apps	Goals	Source
39	DF	Matthew Bates	(England)	26	Contract Ended	Free agent	Summer	Free	13	0	
32	GK	Lewis Carey	(England)	20	Contract Ended	Free agent	Summer	Free	0	0	
22	GK	Dean Gerken	(England)	27	Contract Ended	Ipswich Town	Summer	Free	60	0	
1	GK	Tom Heaton	(England)	27	Contract Ended	Burnley	Summer	Free	44	0	
11	MF	Brian Howard	(England)	30	Contract Ended	Free agent	Summer	Free	6	0	
14	MF	Cole Skuse	(England)	27	Contract Ended	Ipswich Town	Summer	Free	307	9	
9	FW	Jon Stead	(England)	30	Contract Ended	Huddersfield Town	Summer	Free	83	20	
3	DF	Mark Wilson	(Scotland)	29	Contract Ended	Free agent	Summer	Free	8	0	
2	DF	Richard Foster	(Scotland)	27	Contract Terminated	Rangers (Scotland)	Summer	Free	52	0	
5	DF	Lewin Nyatanga	(Wales) (England)	24	Contract Ended	Barnsley	Summer	Free	110	4	
21	MF	Paul Anderson	(England)	24	Player Swap	Ipswich Town	Summer	—^{1}	23	3	
16	FW	Steve Davies	(England)	25	Transfer	Blackpool	Summer	£500,000	38	13	
27	MF	Albert Adomah	(Ghana) (England)	25	Transfer	Middlesbrough	Summer	£1,000,000	136	17	
8	MF	Neil Kilkenny	(Australia) (England)	27	Contract Terminated	Preston North End	Winter	Free	72	1	
22	DF	Nicky Shorey	(England)	32	Contract Ended	Portsmouth	Winter	Free	17	0	
18	FW	Ryan Taylor	(England)	25	Contract Terminated	Portsmouth	Winter	Free	39	2	
23	FW	Marlon Harewood	(England)	34	Free transfer	Hartlepool United	Winter	Free	17	1	
20	DF	James Wilson	(Wales)	24	Contract Terminated	Oldham Athletic	Winter	Free	35	1	
37	MF	Toby Ajala	(England)	22	Contract Terminated	Welling United	Winter	Free	2	0	

EU = if holds or not a European Union passport; Country: when 2 flags, 1st flag = country that plays for internationally, 2nd flag = country of birth; N = number on jersey; P = Position (for position name, pause mouse pointer on abbreviation); Name = Name on jersey (for more extensive name, pause mouse pointer on name); Age = age on the day of the signing; Moving from = only indicate the club the player was playing before start playing for this club in this season, for the type of the moving see Status column; Moving to = only indicates the club the player is going to play next, for the type of the moving see Status column; Ends = when the player's current contract ends; n/a = Not applicable; Apps = Total number of competitive appearances (including substitute appearances) at the club prior to departure; Goals = Total number of competitive goals scored at the club prior to departure.
- Total income: ▲ ~ £1,500,000

Notes

^{1} The player swap included Jay Emmanuel-Thomas coming into the club and Paul Anderson leaving for Ipswich Town.

=== Loans out ===
No.	Pos.	Name	Country	Age	Loan club	Started	Ended	Start source	End source
4	DF	Liam Fontaine	(England)	27	Yeovil Town	2 September	4 January		
20	DF	James Wilson	(Wales)	37	Cheltenham Town	13 September	Unknown		
8	MF	Neil Kilkenny	(Australia) (England)	28	Preston North End	14 November	6 January		
26	DF	Mitch Brundle	(England)	19	Cheltenham Town	31 January	31 May		
13	GK	Elliott Parish	(England)	23	Newport County	10 February	March		

Sources: For loan start source see "Start source". For loan end source see "End source".
EU = if holds or not a European Union passport; Country: when 2 flags, 1st flag = country that plays for internationally, 2nd flag = country of birth; No. = number on jersey; P = Position (for position name, pause mouse pointer on abbreviation); Name = Name on jersey (for more extensive name, pause mouse pointer on name); In/Out = In: The player came in on loan, Out: The player went out on loan; Loan club = the club that the player moved on loan to or the club that the player came from on loan; Started = the date when the player's loan started; Ended = the date when the player's loan ended.

== Fixtures and results ==
=== Pre-season ===
3 July 2013 Friendly	Ashton & Backwell United	0–1	Bristol City	Backwell
19:30 BST		Report	Bryan 65'	Stadium: Backwell Recreation Ground

6 July 2013 Friendly	Clevedon Town	2–1	Bristol City	Clevedon
15:00 BST	Brimson 14'; Robbins 17'	Report	Woods 7'	Stadium: Hand Stadium

13 July 2013 Friendly	Bristol City	0–1	Rangers	Bristol
12:30 BST		Report	Macleod 63'	Stadium: Ashton Gate Stadium

20 July 2013 Friendly	Forest Green Rovers	0–1	Bristol City	Nailsworth
15:00 BST		Report	Kelly 10'	Stadium: The New Lawn

24 July 2013 Friendly	Bristol City	1–0	Reading	Bristol
19:45 BST	Adomah 82'			Stadium: Ashton Gate Stadium

27 July 2013 Friendly	Bournemouth	0–0	Bristol City	Bournemouth
15:00 BST		Report		Stadium: Dean Court

=== League One ===
3 August 2013 1	Bristol City	2–2	Bradford City	Bristol
15:00 BST	Wagstaff 13'; Emmanuel-Thomas 58'	Report	33' Wells; 79' McArdle	Stadium: Ashton Gate Stadium; Attendance: 13,862; Referee: Stephen Martin

11 August 2013 2	Coventry City	5–4	Bristol City	Northampton
15:00 BST	Clarke 27'; Wilson 43', 75'; Daniels 45', 87'	Report	55', 74' Baldock; 62' Emmanuel-Thomas; 85' Elliott	Stadium: Sixfields Stadium; Attendance: 2,204

17 August 2013 3	Bristol City	1–2	Wolverhampton Wanderers	Bristol
15:00 BST	Emmanuel-Thomas 53'	Report	22' Sako; 85' Doherty	Stadium: Ashton Gate Stadium; Attendance: 14,393

24 August 2013 4	Milton Keynes Dons	2–2	Bristol City	Milton Keynes
15:00 BST	Bamford 52'; Carruthers 69'	Report	36', 66' Baldock	Stadium: Stadium:mk; Attendance: 7,874

31 August 2013 5	Gillingham	1–1	Bristol City	Gillingham
15:00 BST	Akinfenwa 22'	Report	45' Elliott	Stadium: Priestfield Stadium; Attendance: 5,616; Referee: Russell

7 September 2013	Bristol City	P–P	Shrewsbury Town	Bristol
15:00 BST		Report		Stadium: Ashton Gate Stadium

14 September 2013 6	Bristol City	0–3	Peterborough United	Bristol
15:00 BST		Report	24' Barnett; 51', 88' Assombalonga	Stadium: Ashton Gate Stadium; Attendance: 11,134; Referee: Adcock

17 September 2013 7	Bristol City	1–1	Shrewsbury Town	Bristol
19:45 BST	Emmanuel-Thomas 85'	Report	28' Taylor	Stadium: Ashton Gate Stadium; Attendance: 10,143; Referee: Robinson

21 September 2013 8	Swindon Town	3–2	Bristol City	Swindon
15:00 BST	Ajose 19', 43'; Ranger 87'	Report	9' Flint; 36' Emmanuel-Thomas	Stadium: County Ground; Attendance: 11,598; Referee: Taylor

28 September 2013 9	Bristol City	1–1	Colchester United	Bristol
15:00 BST	Baldock 74'	Report	30' Taylor	Stadium: Ashton Gate Stadium; Attendance: 10,739; Referee: Phillips

5 October 2013 10	Port Vale	1–1	Bristol City	Stoke
15:00 BST	Hughes 90'	Report	Wagstaff 55'	Stadium: Vale Park; Attendance: 6,275; Referee: Stockbridge

12 October 2013	Bristol City	P–P	Crawley Town	Bristol
15:00 BST				Stadium: Ashton Gate Stadium

19 October 2013 11	Crewe Alexandra	1–0	Bristol City	Crewe
15:00 BST	Moore 90' (pen.)	Report		Stadium: Alexandra Stadium; Attendance: 4,781; Referee: Geoff Eltringham

22 October 2013 12	Bristol City	1–2	Brentford	Bristol
19:45 BST	Harewood 90'	Report	79' Saunders; 86' Donaldson	Stadium: Ashton Gate Stadium; Attendance: 10,639; Referee: Phil Gibbs

26 October 2013 13	Carlisle United	2–4	Bristol City	Carlisle
15:00 BST	O'Hanlon 24'; Noble 80'	Report	51', 52', 84' Emmanuel-Thomas; 72' Wagstaff	Stadium: Brunton Park; Attendance: 4,672; Referee: Scott Duncan

2 November 2013 14	Bristol City	1–1	Oldham Athletic	Bristol
15:00 BST	Emmanuel-Thomas 36'	Report	77' James Dayton	Stadium: Ashton Gate Stadium; Attendance: 11,352; Referee: Andy Madley

5 November 2013 15	Bristol City	2–0	Crawley Town	Bristol
19:45 BST	Emmanuel-Thomas 80'; Bryan 87'	Report		Stadium: Ashton Gate Stadium; Attendance: 10,085; Referee: Brendan Malone

16 November 2013 16	Tranmere Rovers	1–1	Bristol City	Tranmere
15:00 BST	Ridehalgh 41'	Report	14' Baldock	Stadium: Prenton Park; Attendance: 4,932; Referee: Kevin Wright

23 November 2013 17	Bristol City	0–1	Sheffield United	Bristol
15:00 GMT		Report	78'og Flint	Stadium: Ashton Gate Stadium; Attendance: 13,220; Referee: Keith Stroud

26 November 2013 18	Bristol City	2–2	Leyton Orient	Bristol
19:45 GMT	Baldock 58'; Cuthbert 73' (o.g.)	Report	23' Mooney; 70' Cox	Stadium: Ashton Gate Stadium; Attendance: 10,659; Referee: Andy Davies

30 November 2013 19	Preston North End	1–0	Bristol City	Preston
15:00 GMT	King 33'; Gallagher (red card) 90+2'	Report	(red card) 90+3' Osborne	Stadium: Deepdale; Attendance: 8,803; Referee: Richard Clark

14 December 2013 20	Bristol City	1–2	Rotherham United	Bristol
15:00 GMT	Reid 82'	Report	3' Dicko; 27' Pringle	Stadium: Ashton Gate Stadium; Attendance: 11,201; Referee: Lee Collins

21 December 2013 21	Notts County	1–1	Bristol City	Nottingham
15:00 GMT	Sheehan 89' (pen.)	Report	41' (pen.) Baldock	Stadium: Meadow Lane; Attendance: 6,523; Referee: Charles Breakspear

26 December 2013 22	Bristol City	1–0	Walsall	Bristol
15:00 GMT	Baldock 41' (pen.)	Report		Stadium: Ashton Gate Stadium; Attendance: 12,031; Referee: David Webb

29 December 2013 23	Bristol City	4–1	Stevenage	Bristol
12:45 GMT	Cunningham 7'; Baldock 12'; Emmanuel-Thomas 69', 72'	Report	74' Zoko	Stadium: Ashton Gate Stadium; Attendance: 12,038; Referee: Jeremey Simpson

11 January 2014 24	Bradford City	1–1	Bristol City	Bradford
15:00 GMT	Hanson 1'	Report	11' Wagstaff	Stadium: Valley Parade; Attendance: 13,050; Referee: Eddie Ilderton

18 January 2014 25	Bristol City	2–2	Milton Keynes Dons	Bristol
15:00 GMT	Baldock 57', 76'	Report	17' Williams; 36' Reeves	Stadium: Ashton Gate Stadium; Attendance: 11,533; Referee: David Phillips

25 January 2014 26	Wolverhampton Wanderers	3–1	Bristol City	Wolverhampton
15:00 GMT	Dicko 10', 44'; Sako 76'	Report	24' (pen.) Baldock	Stadium: Molineux Stadium; Attendance: 18,501; Referee: Nigel Miller

28 January 2014 27	Brentford	3–1	Bristol City	London
19:45 GMT	Flint 9' (o.g.); Judge 26'; Trotta 42'	Report	12' Osborne; El-Abd	Stadium: Griffin Park; Attendance: 6,517; Referee: James Lingington

1 February 2014 28	Bristol City	2–1	Carlisle United	Bristol
15:00 GMT	M Elliott 68', 70'	Report	36' Potts	Stadium: Ashton Gate Stadium; Attendance: 11,029; Referee: Trevor Kettle

4 February 2014 29	Bristol City	1–2	Coventry City	Bristol
19:45 GMT	Burns 82'	Report	7' Moussa; 25' Webster	Stadium: Ashton Gate Stadium; Attendance: 11,272; Referee: Andy Woolmer

8 February 2014 30	Oldham Athletic	1–1	Bristol City	Oldham
15:00 GMT	Philliskirk 5'	Report	10' Flint	Stadium: Boundary Park; Attendance: 3,882; Referee: Darren Deadman

11 February 2014 31	Leyton Orient	1–3	Bristol City	London
19:45 GMT	Lisbie 44'	Report	3' Baldock; 12' Barnett; 76' Flint	Stadium: Matchroom Stadium; Attendance: 3,928; Referee: Carl Berry

15 February 2014 32	Bristol City	2–2	Tranmere Rovers	Bristol
15:00 GMT	Baldock 13'; Williams 78'	Report	19' Cassidy; 80' Koumas	Stadium: Ashton Gate Stadium; Attendance: 11,340; Referee: Michael Bull

22 February 2014 33	Sheffield United	3–0	Bristol City	Sheffield
15:00 GMT	Brayford 43'; Flynn 58'; Baxter 70' (pen.)	Report		Stadium: Brammall Lane; Attendance: 19,271; Referee: Scott Duncan

1 March 2014 34	Bristol City	2–1	Gillingham	Bristol
15:00 GMT	Baldock 27'; Gillett 83'	Report	65' Lee	Stadium: Ashton Gate Stadium; Attendance: 11,422; Referee: Gary Sutton

8 March 2014 35	Shrewsbury Town	2–3	Bristol City	Shrewsbury
15:00 GMT	Mkandawire 41'; Parry 60'	Report	18' Emmanuel-Thomas; 55' (o.g.) Mkandawire; 63' Bryan	Stadium: New Meadow; Attendance: 6,069; Referee: Graham Horwood

11 March 2014 36	Peterborough United	1–2	Bristol City	Peterborough
19:45 GMT	Bostwick 44'	Report	10', 16' Baldock; (red card) 20' El-Abd	Stadium: London Road Stadium; Attendance: 4,352; Referee: Phill Gibbs

15 March 2014 37	Bristol City	0–0	Swindon Town	Bristol
15:00 GMT		Report	(red card) 55' Pritchard	Stadium: Ashton Gate Stadium; Attendance: 14,884; Referee: Trevor Kettle

22 March 2014 38	Colchester United	2–2	Bristol City	Colchester
15:00 GMT	Massey 73'; Sears 79'	Report	8' Paterson; 49' Wagstaff	Stadium: Colchester Community Stadium; Attendance: 3,805; Referee: Steve Rushton

25 March 2014 39	Bristol City	5–0	Port Vale	Bristol
19:45 GMT	Emmanuel-Thomas 16', 45'; Nosworthy 41'; Baldock 45', 74'	Report	(yellow card) 67' (yellow-red card) 68' Dickinson	Stadium: Ashton Gate Stadium; Attendance: 10,940; Referee: Keith Hill

29 March 2014 40	Rotherham United	2–1	Bristol City	Rotherham
15:00 GMT	Tavernier 2', 60'	Report	48' Elliott	Stadium: New York Stadium; Attendance: 8,607; Referee: Gavin Ward

5 April 2014 41	Bristol City	1–1	Preston North End	Bristol
15:00 BST	Elliott 75'	Report	69' King	Stadium: Ashton Gate Stadium; Attendance: 12,537; Referee: Robert Lewis

12 April 2014 42	Walsall	0–1	Bristol City	Walsall
15:00 BST		Report	45' (pen.) Baldock	Stadium: Bescot Stadium; Attendance: 5,110; Referee: Nigel Miller

18 April 2014 43	Bristol City	2–1	Notts County	Bristol
19:45 BST	Baldock 13', 86'	Report	29' Hollis	Stadium: Ashton Gate Stadium; Attendance: 13,427; Referee: Paul Tierney

21 April 2014 44	Stevenage	1–3	Bristol City	Stevenage
15:00 BST	Freeman 85'	Report	42' Elliott; 66' Baldock; 75' Pearson	Stadium: Broadhall Way; Attendance: 2,901; Referee: Lee Collins

26 April 2014 45	Bristol City	0–0	Crewe Alexandra	Bristol
15:00 BST		Report		Stadium: Ashton Gate Stadium; Attendance: 14,477; Referee: Eddie Ilderton

3 May 2014 46	Crawley Town	1–1	Bristol City	Crawley
15:00 BST	Proctor 26'	Report	Gillett 62'	Stadium: Broadfield Stadium; Attendance: 4,405

=== FA Cup ===
9 November 2013 Round 1	Bristol City	3–0	Dagenham & Redbridge	Bristol
15:00 GMT	Emmanuel-Thomas 35', 90'; Elliott 87'	Report		Stadium: Ashton Gate Stadium; Attendance: 3,763; Referee: Andy Woolmer

8 December 2013 Round 2	Tamworth	1–2	Bristol City	Tamworth
15:00 GMT	Todd 90'	Report	36' Emmanuel-Thomas; 83' Baldock	Stadium: The Lamb Ground; Attendance: 2,860; Referee: Andy D'Urso

4 January 2014 Round 3	Bristol City	1–1	Watford	Bristol
15:00 GMT	Emmanuel-Thomas 85'	Report	84' Murray	Stadium: Ashton Gate Stadium; Attendance: 10,165; Referee: Paul Tierney

14 January 2014 Round 3 replay	Watford	2–0	Bristol City	Watford
19:45 GMT	Faraoni 29'; McGugan 64'	Report		Stadium: Vicarage Road; Attendance: 7,302; Referee: Darren Drysdale

=== League Cup ===
6 August 2013 Round 1	Gillingham	0–2	Bristol City	Gillingham
19:45 BST		Report	21' Baldock; 66' Wynter	Stadium: Priestfield Stadium; Attendance: 2,585; Referee: Darren Deadman

27 August 2013 Round 2	Bristol City	2–1	Crystal Palace	Bristol
19:45 BST	Emmanuel-Thomas 59'; Wagstaff 71'	Report	93' Garvan	Stadium: Ashton Gate Stadium; Attendance: 6,816; Referee: I Williamson

24 September 2013 Round 3	Southampton	2–0	Bristol City	Southampton
19:45 BST	Ramírez 15'; Hooiveld 83'	Report		Stadium: St Mary's Stadium; Attendance: 8,539; Referee: Scott

=== League Trophy ===
4 September 2013 Round 1	Bristol City	2–1	Bristol Rovers	Bristol
19:45 BST	Emmanuel-Thomas 12'; Bryan 76'	Report	59' McChrystal	Stadium: Ashton Gate Stadium; Attendance: 17,888; Referee: Simon Hooper

8 October 2013 Round 2	Wycombe Wanderers	2–1	Bristol City	High Wycombe
19:45 BST	Knott 9'; Bloomfield 27'	Report	56' Maloney	Stadium: Bloomfield Road; Referee: Keith Stroud

== Overall summary ==
=== Summary ===
Games played	55 (46 League One, 4 FA Cup, 3 League Cup, 2 League Trophy)
Games won	18 (13 League One, 2 FA Cup, 2 League Cup, 1 League Trophy)
Games drawn	20 (19 League One, 1 FA Cup, 0 League Cup, 0 League Trophy)
Games lost	17 (14 League One, 1 FA Cup, 1 League Cup, 1 League Trophy)
Goals scored	83 (70 League One, 6 FA Cup, 4 League Cup, 3 League Trophy)
Goals conceded	77 (67 League One, 4 FA Cup, 3 League Cup, 3 League Trophy)
Goal difference	+6
Clean sheets	8 (6 League One, 1 FA Cup, 1 League Cup, 0 League Trophy)
Yellow cards	72 (60 League One, 3 FA Cup, 2 League Cup,5 League Trophy)
Red cards	2 (2 League One, 0 FA Cup, 0 League Cup, 0 League Trophy)
Worst discipline	Adam El-Abd (3 (yellow card) , 1 (red card) )
Best result	5–0 vs Port Vale
Worst result	0–3 vs Peterborough United
Most appearances	Jay Emmanuel-Thomas (55 appearances)
Top scorer	Sam Baldock (26 goals)
Points	58

=== Score overview ===
Opposition	Home score	Away score	Double	Point	Agg.
Bradford City	2–2	1–1	No	2	3–3
Brentford	1–2	1–3	No	0	2–5
Carlisle United	2–1	4–2	Yes	6	6–3
Colchester United	1–1	2–2	No	2	3–3
Coventry City	1–2	4–5	No	0	5–7
Crawley Town	2–0	1–1	No	4	3–1
Crewe Alexandra	0–0	0–1	No	1	0–1
Gillingham	2–1	1–1	No	4	3–2
Leyton Orient	2–2	3–1	No	4	5–3
Milton Keynes Dons	2–2	2–2	No	2	4–4
Notts County	2–1	1–1	No	4	3–2
Oldham Athletic	1–1	1–1	No	2	2–2
Peterborough United	0–3	2–1	No	3	2–4
Port Vale	5–0	1–1	No	4	6–1
Preston North End	1–1	0–1	No	1	1–2
Rotherham United	1–2	1–2	No	0	2–4
Sheffield United	0–1	0–3	No	0	0–4
Shrewsbury Town	1–1	3–2	No	4	4–3
Stevenage	4–1	3–1	Yes	6	7–2
Swindon Town	0–0	2–3	No	1	2–3
Tranmere Rovers	2–2	1–1	No	2	3–3
Walsall	1–0	1–0	Yes	6	2–0
Wolverhampton Wanderers	1–2	1–3	No	0	2–5
