= Mitch Brundle =

English footballer (born 1994)

Personal information
- Full name: Mitch Ronnie Brundle
- Date of birth: 4 December 1994 (age 31)
- Place of birth: Croydon, England
- Height: 5 ft 10 in (1.78 m)
- Position: Midfielder

Youth career
- 2011–2012: Yeovil Town

Senior career*
Years	Team	Apps	(Gls)
2012–2013	Yeovil Town	0	(0)
2013–2014	Bristol City	0	(0)
2014	→ Cheltenham Town (loan)	7	(0)
2014–2016	Braintree Town	77	(7)
2016	→ Hemel Hempstead Town (loan)	4	(0)
2016–2017	Gateshead	34	(2)
2017–2019	Dover Athletic	91	(12)
2019–2021	Dagenham & Redbridge	44	(9)
2021–2022	Barnet	22	(3)
2022	Farnborough	14	(0)
2022–2023	Dover Athletic	17	(0)
2024	Lydd Town	9	(2)

Managerial career
- 2023: Dover Athletic
- * Club domestic league appearances and goals as of 18:06, 16 January 2025 (UTC)

Mitch Ronnie Brundle (born 4 December 1994) is an English professional football manager and footballer, who plays as a midfielder.

== Career ==
Brundle was born in Croydon, London. He joined League One club Yeovil Town as a first-year scholar in May 2011, having formerly been a member of the youth systems of Millwall and Cambridge United. Following the completion of his two-year scholarship, he was released along with his fellow scholars.

Following his release by Yeovil, Brundle signed for League One club Bristol City. On 31 January 2014, Brundle joined League Two club Cheltenham Town on loan until the end of the season. Brundle made his Football League debut in a 1–0 victory against Newport County on 22 February 2014. Brundle returned from his loan spell at Cheltenham having made seven appearances for the League Two club. At the end of the 2013–14 season, Brundle was released by Bristol City after failing to make an appearance.

Brundle signed for Conference Premier club Braintree Town on 30 July 2014 on a one-year contract.

On 15 January 2016, Brundle joined National League South club Hemel Hempstead Town on loan for one month.

Brundle signed for Braintree's fellow National League club Gateshead on 27 June 2016 on a one-year contract. He was released by Gateshead after just one season at the club.

Following his release from Gateshead, Brundle signed for fellow National League club Dover Athletic on 28 May 2017 on a two-year contract.

Brundle signed for Dover's National League rivals Dagenham & Redbridge on 26 June 2019 on a two-year contract. He was released by Dagenham along with five others in June 2021 following the expiration of his contract.

Brundle signed for Barnet in July 2021 on a two-year contract. He left the club in January 2022 by mutual consent.

The following month he joined Farnborough. Despite gaining promotion with the club, it was announced that Brundle would leave at the end of his contract in June.

On 2 July 2022, Brundle returned to Dover Athletic following their relegation to the National League South, taking on the role of player/assistant manager. Following the departure of Andy Hessenthaler in January 2023, Brundle was given joint-caretaker charge of the first-team with academy manager Mike Sandmann. He was given the job on a permanent basis on 16 January 2023, making him the youngest manager ever in English football. On 5 December 2023, Brundle was sacked with the club sitting in 23rd position, ten points from safety having accumulated just twelve points from twenty-one matches.

In January 2024, Brundle returned to his playing career with SCEFL Premier Division club Lydd Town.

== Personal life ==
Brundle founded sportswear brand MPR Sports with fellow non-league footballer James Rogers.

== Career statistics ==
As of end of 2023–24 season

Appearances and goals by club, season and competition
Club	Season	League			FA Cup		League Cup		Other		Total	
Club	Season	Division	Apps	Goals	Apps	Goals	Apps	Goals	Apps	Goals	Apps	Goals
Yeovil Town	2011–12	League One	0	0	0	0	0	0	0	0	0	0
Yeovil Town	2012–13	League One	0	0	0	0	0	0	0	0	0	0
Yeovil Town	Total		0	0	0	0	0	0	0	0	0	0
Bristol City	2013–14	League One	0	0	0	0	0	0	0	0	0	0
Cheltenham Town (loan)	2013–14	League Two	7	0	—		—		—		7	0
Braintree Town	2014–15	Conference Premier	43	4	3	0	—		2 (Note: Appearance(s) in FA Trophy)	0	48	4
Braintree Town	2015–16	National League	34	3	3	0	—		2 (Note: Appearances in National League play-offs)	0	39	3
Braintree Town	Total		77	7	6	0	0	0	4	0	87	7
Hemel Hempstead Town (loan)	2015–16	National League South	4	0	—		—		—		4	0
Gateshead	2016–17	National League	34	2	2	1	—		1	0	37	3
Dover Athletic	2017–18	National League	46	4	2	0	—		3	1	51	5
Dover Athletic	2018–19	National League	45	8	2	0	—		3	0	50	8
Dover Athletic	Total		91	12	4	0	—		6	1	101	13
Dagenham & Redbridge	2019–20	National League	27	6	1	0	—		3	2	31	8
Dagenham & Redbridge	2020–21	National League	17	3	3	2	—		0	0	20	5
Dagenham & Redbridge	Total		44	9	4	2	—		3	2	51	13
Barnet	2021–22	National League	22	3	1	0	—		1	0	24	3
Farnborough	2021–22	SFL Premier Division South	14	0	0	0	—		2 (Note: Appearance in SFL Premier Division South play-offs)	0	16	0
Dover Athletic	2022–23	National League South	17	0	1	0	—		1	0	19	0
Lydd Town	2023–24	SCEFL Premier Division	9	2	0	0	—		0	0	9	2
Career total			319	35	18	3	0	0	18	3	355	40
