= 2021–22 Ipswich Town F.C. season =

Ipswich Town
2021–22 season
- Owner: Gamechanger 20 Limited
- Chairman: Mike O'Leary
- Manager: Paul Cook (until 4 December 2021); John McGreal (caretaker) (from 6 December to 16 December 2021); Kieran McKenna (from 16 December 2021)
- Stadium: Portman Road
- League One: 11th
- FA Cup: Second round
- EFL Cup: First round
- EFL Trophy: Second round
- Top goalscorer: League: Wes Burns / Macauley Bonne (12); All: Wes Burns (13)
- Highest home attendance: 29,005 (vs Sunderland, 18 Dec 2021)
- Lowest home attendance: 18,111 (vs Doncaster Rovers, 28 Sep 2021)
- Average home league attendance: 21,779
Home colours	Away colours	Third colours

The 2021–22 season was Ipswich Town's 144th year in their history and third consecutive season in League One. Along with the league, the club also competed in the FA Cup, the EFL Cup and the EFL Trophy. The season covered the period from 1 July 2021 to 30 June 2022.

== Kits ==
Supplier: Adidas / Sponsor: Ed Sheeran (chest), Thank You NHS (back), Mortgagemove (shorts)

Home	Away	Away alt.1	Third

== First-team squad ==
Number	Position(s)	Nationality	Name	Age
Goalkeepers
28	GK	(England)	Christian Walton	9 November 1995 (aged 26)
31	GK	(Czech Republic)	Václav Hladký	14 November 1990 (aged 31)
Defenders
3	LB	(England)	Matt Penney	11 February 1998 (aged 24)
5	CB	(England)	George Edmundson	15 August 1997 (aged 24)
6	CB / RB	(England)	Luke Woolfenden	21 October 1998 (aged 23)
22	LB	(England)	Dominic Thompson	26 July 2000 (aged 21)
24	RB / LB	(England)	Kane Vincent-Young	15 March 1996 (aged 26)
26	CB	(Australia)	Cameron Burgess	21 October 1995 (aged 26)
44	CB / RB / LB	(Saint Lucia)	Janoi Donacien	3 November 1993 (aged 28)
47	CB	(Indonesia)	Elkan Baggott	23 October 2002 (aged 19)
Midfielders
7	RW / RB	(Wales)	Wes Burns	23 November 1994 (aged 27)
8	CM	(Wales)	Lee Evans	24 July 1994 (aged 27)
12	CM	(England)	Tyreeq Bakinson	10 October 1998 (aged 23)
16	AM	(Tunisia)	Idris El Mizouni	26 September 2000 (aged 21)
25	CM	(England)	Tom Carroll	28 May 1992 (aged 30)
43	AM / LW / RW	(Kosovo)	Bersant Celina	9 September 1996 (aged 25)
55	DM	(Egypt)	Sam Morsy (C)	10 September 1991 (aged 30)
Forwards
9	CF	(England)	Joe Pigott	24 November 1993 (aged 28)
10	CF	(England)	James Norwood	5 September 1990 (aged 31)
18	CF	(Zimbabwe)	Macauley Bonne	26 October 1995 (aged 26)
19	CF	(England)	Kayden Jackson	22 February 1994 (aged 28)
21	SS / LW	(England)	Conor Chaplin	16 February 1997 (aged 25)
23	SS / LW / RW	(Nigeria)	Sone Aluko	19 February 1989 (aged 33)
29	LW	(England)	Kyle Edwards	17 February 1998 (aged 24)
Players transferred/loaned out during the season
1	GK	(Czech Republic)	Tomáš Holý	10 December 1991 (aged 30)
4	CM	(England)	Rekeem Harper	8 March 2000 (aged 22)
11	AM / CM	(Scotland)	Scott Fraser	30 March 1995 (aged 27)
12	CF / LW / RW	(England)	Louie Barry	21 June 2003 (aged 18)
14	RW / LW / AM	(Albania)	Armando Dobra	14 April 2001 (aged 21)
15	CB	(Republic of Ireland)	Corrie Ndaba	25 December 1999 (aged 22)
20	CM	(England)	Jon Nolan	22 April 1992 (aged 30)
22	CB	(Democratic Republic of the Congo)	Aristote Nsiala	25 March 1992 (aged 30)
27	LB / LM	(England)	Hayden Coulson	17 June 1998 (aged 23)

== First-team coaching staff ==
Until 4 December:

Position	Name
Manager	(England) Paul Cook
First-team Coach	(England) Gary Roberts
First-team Coach	(England) Francis Jeffers
First-team Coach	(England) Ian Craney
Goalkeeping coach	(England) John Keeley
Director of performance	(England) Andy Rolls
Head of Sports Science	(Australia) Andy Costin
Head of Strength & Conditioning	(England) Ivan Mukandi
First-team Fitness Coach	(England) Jon Ashton
Sports Therapist	(England) Tom Walsh
Head physiotherapist	(England) Matt Byard
Assistant Head Physiotherapist	(England) Alex Chapman
Head of performance Analysis	(England) Will Stephenson
First-team Assistant Analyst	(England) George Buckley
Recruitment Analyst	(England) Alex Hood
Kitman	(England) James Pullen

From 16 December:

Position	Name
Manager	(Northern Ireland) Kieran McKenna
Assistant manager	(England) Martyn Pert
Goalkeeping coach	(Republic of Ireland) Rene Gilmartin
Director of performance	(England) Andy Rolls
Head of Sports Science	(Australia) Andy Costin
Head of Strength & Conditioning	(England) Ivan Mukandi
First-team Fitness Coach	(England) Jon Ashton
Head physiotherapist	(England) Matt Byard
Assistant Head Physiotherapist	(England) Alex Chapman
Head of Analysis	(England) Charlie Turnbull
Head of performance Analysis	(England) Will Stephenson
Recruitment Analyst	(England) Alex Hood
Kitman	(England) James Pullen

== Pre-season friendlies ==
Ipswich Town announced they would play friendlies against Dartford, Bury Town, Stevenage, Crystal Palace, A double-header against Colchester United and Millwall as part of their pre-season preparations.

10 July 2021 Friendly	Dartford	0–1	Ipswich Town	Dartford
13:00 BST		Report	Chirewa 73'	Stadium: Princes Park

13 July 2021 Friendly	Bury Town	1–1 (5–3 p)	Ipswich Town XI	Bury St Edmunds
19:30 BST	Edwards 72'	Report	Humphreys 8'	Stadium: Ram Meadow
	Penalties
	Chambers-Shaw (penalty scored); Mahew (penalty scored); Stafford (penalty scored); Taylor (penalty scored); Edwards (penalty scored)		Moodie (penalty scored); Manly (penalty missed); Osbourne (penalty scored); Nwabueze (penalty scored)

17 July 2021 Friendly	Fulham	2–1	Ipswich Town	London
	Mitrović; Carvalho	Report	Evans	Stadium: Motspur Park; Attendance: 0

20 July 2021 Friendly	Stevenage	Cancelled	Ipswich Town	Needham Market
13:00 BST				Stadium: Bloomfields
Note: Match was cancelled due to Stevenage pulling out.

24 July 2021 Friendly	Ipswich Town	0–1	Crystal Palace	Ipswich
15:00 BST		Report	Zaha 60' (pen.)	Stadium: Portman Road; Attendance: 4,500+

27 July 2021 Friendly	Colchester United	3–3	Ipswich Town	Colchester
19:45 BST	Smith 27'; Nouble 41'; Judge 70'	Report	Pigott 6'; Bonne 29'; Burns 87'	Stadium: JobServe Community Stadium

31 July 2021 Friendly	Ipswich Town	0–3	Millwall	Ipswich
15:00 BST		Report	Afobe 39', 52'; Wallace 56'	Stadium: Portman Road

== Competitions ==
=== League One ===
==== League table ====
Pos	Team	Pld	W	D	L	GF	GA	GD	Pts
7	Plymouth Argyle	46	23	11	12	68	48	+20	80
8	Oxford United	46	22	10	14	82	59	+23	76
9	Bolton Wanderers	46	21	10	15	74	57	+17	73
10	Portsmouth	46	20	13	13	68	51	+17	73
11	Ipswich Town	46	18	16	12	67	46	+21	70
12	Accrington Stanley	46	17	10	19	61	80	−19	61
13	Charlton Athletic	46	17	8	21	55	59	−4	59
14	Cambridge United	46	15	13	18	56	74	−18	58
15	Cheltenham Town	46	13	17	16	66	80	−14	56

Source: EFL Official Website
Rules for classification: 1) Points; 2) Goal difference; 3) Number of goals scored; 4) Head-to-head results; 5) Wins; 6) Away goals; 7) Penalty points based on yellow and red cards received excluding the last four games of the season (sec 9.5); 8) 12-point sending off offences; 9) If the tie affects the automatic promotion or relegation places, a play-off game or games would be held between the two tied teams

==== Results summary ====
Overall								Home						Away					
Pld	W	D	L	GF	GA	GD	Pts	W	D	L	GF	GA	GD	W	D	L	GF	GA	GD
46	18	16	12	67	46	+21	70	11	9	3	38	22	+16	7	7	9	29	24	+5

Last updated: 30 April 2022.

==== Results by matchday ====
Matchday	1	2	3	4	5	6	7	8	9	10	11	12	13	14	15	16	17	18	19	20	21	22	23	24	25	26	27	28	29	30	31	32	33	34	35	36	37	38	39	40	41	42	43	44	45	46
Ground	H	A	A	H	H	H	A	H	H	A	H	A	A	H	A	A	H	A	H	H	A	A	H	H	A	A	H	A	A	H	A	A	H	H	A	A	H	H	A	H	H	A	A	H	A	H
Result	D	L	L	D	D	L	W	D	W	L	W	D	W	W	L	W	D	L	L	W	L	D	D	W	W	L	W	W	L	W	W	D	W	D	D	W	W	D	D	W	L	D	L	D	D	W
Position	9	16	19	20	21	22	19	21	19	19	14	15	13	10	11	9	9	10	13	11	11	12	11	11	10	11	9	8	9	9	9	9	9	9	9	9	9	9	9	9	9	9	10	11	11	11

Updated to match(es) played on 30 April 2022. Source: Statto.com
A = Away; H = Home; W = Win; D = Draw; L = Loss

==== Matches ====
Ipswich's fixtures were announced on 24 June 2021.

7 August 2021 1	Ipswich Town	2–2	Morecambe	Ipswich
15:00 BST	Fraser 61'; Evans (yellow card) 77'; Penney (yellow card) 79'; Norwood (yellow card) 83'; Bonne 90+1'	Report	Stockton 22', 72'; O'Connor (yellow card) 49'; Gibson (yellow card) 75'	Stadium: Portman Road; Attendance: 21,037; Referee: Craig Hicks

14 August 2021 2	Burton Albion	2–1	Ipswich Town	Burton upon Trent
15:00 BST	Taylor (yellow card) 15'; Powell 19'; O'Connor (yellow card) 57'; Akins 86' (pen.); Mancienne (yellow card) 90+2'	Report	Pigott 22'; Fraser (penalty missed) 58'	Stadium: Pirelli Stadium; Attendance: 3,766; Referee: Sam Purkiss

17 August 2021 3	Cheltenham Town	2–1	Ipswich Town	Cheltenham
19:45 BST	Raglan (yellow card) 15'; Wright (yellow card) 29', (goal) 62'; Thomas (yellow card) 64'; Boyle 81'	Report	Penney 9'; Evans (yellow card) 27'	Stadium: Jonny-Rocks Stadium; Attendance: 4,746; Referee: Peter Wright

21 August 2021 4	Ipswich Town	2–2	Milton Keynes Dons	Ipswich
15:00 BST	Bonne 16', 72'; Vincent-Young (yellow card) 50'; Woolfenden (yellow card) 57'	Report	O'Hora (yellow card) 4'; Twine 58'; O'Riley 75'	Stadium: Portman Road; Attendance: 18,622; Referee: Josh Smith

28 August 2021 5	Ipswich Town	2–2	AFC Wimbledon	Ipswich
15:00 BST	Pigott 52' (pen.); Burns 54'; Hladký (yellow card) 79'	Report	Woodyard (yellow card) 16'; Hartigan (yellow card) 45'; Nightingale (yellow card) 52'; Heneghan 58'; Rudoni 90+5'	Stadium: Portman Road; Attendance: 19,051; Referee: David Rock

11 September 2021 6	Ipswich Town	2–5	Bolton Wanderers	Ipswich
15:00 BST	Bonne 5'; Vincent-Young (yellow card) 13'; Santos 30' (o.g.)	Report	Afolayan 10', 45+2'; Doyle 18' (pen.); Isgrove (yellow card) 20'; Jones (yellow card) 24'; Sheehan 47'; Johnston 57'	Stadium: Portman Road; Attendance: 19,267; Referee: Bobby Madley

18 September 2021 7	Lincoln City	0–1	Ipswich Town	Lincoln
15:00 BST	Bishop (yellow card) 74'	Report	Bonne 30'; Burns (yellow card) 59'; Evans (yellow card) 83'	Stadium: LNER Stadium; Attendance: 9,874; Referee: Ben Speedie

25 September 2021 8	Ipswich Town	1–1	Sheffield Wednesday	Ipswich
15:00 BST	El Mizouni (yellow card) 79'; Chaplin 90'; Fraser (yellow card) 90+4'	Report	Adeniran 26'	Stadium: Portman Road; Attendance: 21,338; Referee: Andy Davies

28 September 2021 9	Ipswich Town	6–0	Doncaster Rovers	Ipswich
19:45 BST	Burgess (yellow card) 5'; Bonne 13', 72'; Evans 31', 70', 76'; Edmundson 80'	Report	Dodoo (yellow card) 58'; Smith (yellow card) 58'	Stadium: Portman Road; Attendance: 18,111; Referee: Carl Brook

2 October 2021 10	Accrington Stanley	2–1	Ipswich Town	Accrington
15:00 BST	Bishop 50'; Pell 79'; Hamilton (yellow card) 81'; Conneely (yellow card) 90'	Report	Bonne 38'; Norwood (yellow card) 90'	Stadium: Wham Stadium; Attendance: 2,600; Referee: Martin Coy

9 October 2021 11	Ipswich Town	2–1	Shrewsbury Town	Ipswich
15:00 BST	Chaplin 23'; Burgess (yellow card) 39'; Bonne 54'; Fraser (yellow card) 90+2'; Edmundson (yellow card) 90+3'	Report	Whalley 28'; Pierre (yellow card) 68'	Stadium: Portman Road; Attendance: 19,256; Referee: Will Finnie

16 October 2021 12	Cambridge United	2–2	Ipswich Town	Cambridge
15:00 BST	Brophy 40'; Ironside 88'	Report	Aluko 10', 36'; Chaplin (yellow card) 37'	Stadium: Abbey Stadium; Attendance: 7,944; Referee: Leigh Doughty

19 October 2021 13	Portsmouth	0–4	Ipswich Town	Milton
19:45 BST	Curtis (yellow card) 13'; Harness (yellow card) 18'	Report	Edmundson (yellow card) 29'; Bonne 41'; Chaplin 54'; Aluko 58'; Morsy (yellow card) 72'; Burns 75'	Stadium: Fratton Park; Attendance: 16,301; Referee: Josh Smith

23 October 2021 14	Ipswich Town	2–1	Fleetwood Town	Ipswich
15:00 BST	Chaplin 49'; Morsy (yellow card) 77'; Celina 90+3', (yellow card) 90+4'	Report	Hill (yellow card) 32'; Matete (yellow card) 71'; Johnson (yellow card) 79'; Morton 82'	Stadium: Portman Road; Attendance: 20,099; Referee: Samuel Allison

30 October 2021 15	Plymouth Argyle	2–1	Ipswich Town	Plymouth
15:00 BST	Jephcott 44'; Grant 50'; Garrick (yellow card) 75'	Report	Edmundson 14', (yellow card) 22'; Chaplin (yellow card) 26'; Morsy (yellow card) 56'; Nsiala (yellow card) 75'	Stadium: Home Park; Attendance: 16,087; Referee: Robert Lewis

2 November 2021 16	Wycombe Wanderers	1–4	Ipswich Town	High Wycombe
19:45 BST	Wheeler 17'; Hanlan (yellow card) 55'; Scowen (yellow card) 85'	Report	Celina 27', 90+4' (yellow card) 90+5'; Bonne 51'; Burns 60'; Nsiala (yellow card) 73'	Stadium: Adams Park; Attendance: 6,943; Referee: Lee Swabey

13 November 2021 17	Ipswich Town	0–0	Oxford United	Ipswich
15:00 BST	Morsy (yellow card) 80'; Clements (yellow card) 90+1'	Report	Brannagan (yellow card) 40'	Stadium: Portman Road; Attendance: 21,322; Referee: Scott Oldham

20 November 2021 18	Sunderland	2–0	Ipswich Town	Monkwearmouth
15:00 GMT	Evans (yellow card) 20'; Gooch (yellow card) 34'; Stewart (yellow card) 64'; Winchester (yellow card) 81'; O'Nien 85'; McGeady 90+3' (pen.)	Report	Celina (yellow card) 55'	Stadium: Stadium of Light; Attendance: 31,033; Referee: Tom Nield

23 November 2021 19	Ipswich Town	0–2	Rotherham United	Ipswich
19:45 BST	Morsy (yellow card) 88'	Report	Wiles 24'; Lindsay (yellow card) 40'; Ihiekwe (yellow card) 43'; Ferguson 59'; Barlaser (yellow card) 87'	Stadium: Portman Road; Attendance: 18,221; Referee: Gavin Ward

28 November 2021 20	Ipswich Town	2–1	Crewe Alexandra	Ipswich
15:00 GMT	Offord 3' (o.g.); Celina 45+5'; Clements (yellow card) 50'; Edmundson (yellow card) 88'	Report	Williams (yellow card) 48'; Long 73'	Stadium: Portman Road; Attendance: 18,883; Referee: James Oldham

7 December 2021 21	Charlton Athletic	2–0	Ipswich Town	Charlton
19:45 GMT	Stockley 26'; Pearce (yellow card) 68'; Gilbey 88'	Report	Donacien (yellow card) 29'	Stadium: The Valley; Attendance: 26,376; Referee: Chris Sarginson

11 December 2021 22	Wigan Athletic	1–1	Ipswich Town	Wigan
15:00 GMT	Lang 22', (yellow card) 77'; Darikwa (yellow card) 90+2'	Report	Chaplin (yellow card) 30'; Norwood 77'; Edmundson (yellow card) 83'	Stadium: DW Stadium; Attendance: 10,296; Referee: Trevor Kettle

18 December 2021 23	Ipswich Town	1–1	Sunderland	Ipswich
15:00 BST	Norwood 45+1'; Burns (yellow card) 68'	Report	Broadhead 50'; Winchester (yellow card) 52'; Flanagan (yellow card) 60'; Stewart (yellow card) 62'	Stadium: Portman Road; Attendance: 29,005; Referee: Thomas Bramall

29 December 2021 24	Ipswich Town	1–0	Wycombe Wanderers	Ipswich
19:45 BST	Morsy (yellow card) 8'; Penney (yellow card) 10'; Norwood 44'; Pigott (yellow card) 90+1'	Report	Scowen (yellow card) 90+1'	Stadium: Portman Road; Attendance: 26,456; Referee: Sam Barrott

8 January 2022 25	Gillingham	0–4	Ipswich Town	Gillingham
15:00 BST	O'Keefe (yellow card) 63'; Phillips (yellow card) 69' (yellow-red card) 73'	Report	Norwood 9'; Donacien (yellow card) 11'; Burns 13'; Bonne 23'; Chaplin 85' (pen.)	Stadium: Priestfield Stadium; Attendance: 6,401; Referee: Alan Young

15 January 2022 26	Bolton Wanderers	2–0	Ipswich Town	Horwich
15:00 BST	Williams (yellow card) 13'; Lee 74'; Santos (yellow card) 80'; Afolayan 81'	Report	Walton (yellow card) 40'; Norwood (yellow card) 58'; Burns (yellow card) 73'	Stadium: University of Bolton Stadium; Attendance: 14,020; Referee: Bobby Madley

22 January 2022 27	Ipswich Town	2–1	Accrington Stanley	Ipswich
15:00 BST	Burns 23'; Carroll (yellow card) 52'; Chaplin 65'; Edmundson (yellow card) 87'; Celina (yellow card) 89'	Report	Nottingham (yellow card) 8'; Hamilton 15'; Pell (yellow card) 58'; Longelo (yellow card) 82'	Stadium: Portman Road; Attendance: 20,126; Referee: Geoff Eltringham

25 January 2022 28	AFC Wimbledon	0–2	Ipswich Town	Wimbledon
19:45 BST	McCormick (yellow card) 54'	Report	Edmundson (yellow card) 47'; Burns 61', 86'; Vincent-Young (yellow card) 86' (yellow-red card) 90+5'	Stadium: Plough Lane; Attendance: 8,117; Referee: Lee Swabey

29 January 2022 29	Sheffield Wednesday	1–0	Ipswich Town	Owlerton
15:00 GMT	Johnson 6'; Dean (yellow card) 26'	Report		Stadium: Hillsborough; Attendance: 23,517; Referee: Darren Bond

5 February 2022 30	Ipswich Town	1–0	Gillingham	Ipswich
15:00 GMT	Chaplin 74'	Report	Tutonda (yellow card) 11'	Stadium: Portman Road; Attendance: 20,698; Referee: Stephen Martin

8 February 2022 31	Doncaster Rovers	0–1	Ipswich Town	Doncaster
19:45 BST		Report	Bakinson (yellow card) 25', (goal) 39'; Donacien (yellow card) 83'	Stadium: Keepmoat Stadium; Attendance: 6,383; Referee: Ollie Yates

12 February 2022 32	Milton Keynes Dons	0–0	Ipswich Town	Denbigh
15:00 GMT	Watson (yellow card) 52'; Lewington (yellow card) 54'; Coventry (yellow card) 83'	Report	Thompson (yellow card) 63'; Bakinson (yellow card) 67'; Morsy (yellow card) 88'	Stadium: Stadium MK; Attendance: 15,311; Referee: Oliver Langford

19 February 2022 33	Ipswich Town	3–0	Burton Albion	Ipswich
15:00 BST	Jackson 1'; Evans (yellow card) 27'; Burns 62'; Celina 78'	Report	Blake-Tracy (yellow card) 66'; Niasse (yellow card) 67'	Stadium: Portman Road; Attendance: 20,516; Referee: Carl Brook

22 February 2022 34	Ipswich Town	0–0	Cheltenham Town	Ipswich
19:45 BST	Woolfenden (yellow card) 90+4'	Report	Colkett (yellow card) 64'; Freestone (yellow card) 73'; Williams (yellow card) 84'; Raglan (yellow card) 90+4'	Stadium: Portman Road; Attendance: 21,318; Referee: Andy Davies

26 February 2022 35	Morecambe	1–1	Ipswich Town	Morecambe
15:00 GMT	Wildig 59'	Report	Bonne (yellow card) 62'; Burns 86'; Bakinson (yellow card) 88'	Stadium: The Mazuma Stadium; Attendance: 4,928; Referee: Matt Donohue

5 March 2022 36	Fleetwood Town	0–2	Ipswich Town	Fleetwood
15:00 GMT	Pilkington (yellow card) 63'	Report	Woolfenden (yellow card) 69'; Morsy 72', (yellow card) 74'; Jackson 81'	Stadium: Highbury Stadium; Attendance: 4,190; Referee: Andrew Kitchen

8 March 2022 37	Ipswich Town	2–0	Lincoln City	Ipswich
19:45 GMT	Burns 22'; Jackson 32'; Celina (yellow card) 45+1'	Report	Poole (yellow card) 39'; McGrandles (yellow card) 45+1'; Maguire (yellow card) 45+2'	Stadium: Portman Road; Attendance: 24,989; Referee: Tom Reeves

12 March 2022 38	Ipswich Town	0–0	Portsmouth	Ipswich
15:00 BST	Thompson (yellow card) 77'; Donacien (yellow card) 82'	Report	Thompson (yellow card) 30'; Curtis (yellow card) 77'	Stadium: Portman Road; Attendance: 25,500; Referee: Chris Sarginson

19 March 2022 39	Oxford United	1–1	Ipswich Town	Littlemore
15:00 GMT	Williams (yellow card) 90+2'; McNally 90+5'; Sykes (yellow card) 90+6'	Report	Burns (yellow card) 56'; Celina 70'; Bonne (yellow card) 90+4'	Stadium: The Kassam Stadium; Attendance: 11,029; Referee: Marc Edwards

26 March 2022 40	Ipswich Town	1–0	Plymouth Argyle	Ipswich
15:00 GMT	Morsy (yellow card) 28', (goal) 37'; Burns (yellow card) 63'	Report	Crichlow (yellow card) 76'	Stadium: Portman Road; Attendance: 23,256; Referee: David Rock

2 April 2022 41	Ipswich Town	0–1	Cambridge United	Ipswich
15:00 BST	Norwood (yellow card) 39'; Donacien (yellow card) 75'; Woolfenden (yellow card) 85'; Bonne (yellow card) 90+2'	Report	Smith (yellow card) 39'; Thompson 56' (o.g.); Dunk (yellow card) 81'; May (yellow card) 83'	Stadium: Portman Road; Attendance: 26,515; Referee: Craig Hicks

9 April 2022 42	Shrewsbury Town	1–1	Ipswich Town	Shrewsbury
15:00 BST	Leahy (yellow card) 29'; Pennington (yellow card) 43'; Vela (yellow card) 66'; Whalley 84'; Nurse (yellow card) 87'	Report	Norwood 6'; Morsy (yellow card) 25'; Burgess (yellow card) 45+11' (yellow-red card) 75'; Burns (yellow card) 86'; Donacien (yellow card) 87'	Stadium: Montgomery Waters Meadow; Attendance: 7,682; Referee: Darren Handley

16 April 2022 43	Rotherham United	1–0	Ipswich Town	Rotherham
12:30 BST	Edmonds-Green (yellow card) 63'; Smith 78'	Report	Burns (yellow card) 45'; Celina (yellow card) 45+4'; Norwood (yellow card) 47'; Woolfenden (yellow card) 56'; Aluko (yellow card) 65'	Stadium: AESSEAL New York Stadium; Attendance: 9,394; Referee: Peter Wright

19 April 2022 44	Ipswich Town	2–2	Wigan Athletic	Ipswich
19:45 BST	Morsy (yellow card) 40', (goal) 73'; Woolfenden (yellow card) 42'; Chaplin 61'; Burns (yellow card) 71'; Bakinson (yellow card) 90+6'	Report	Watts (yellow card) 26'; Keane 45', 86'; Lang (yellow card) 60'	Stadium: Portman Road; Attendance: 21,329; Referee: Will Finne

23 April 2022 45	Crewe Alexandra	1–1	Ipswich Town	Crewe
15:00 BST	Lowery (yellow card) 60', (goal) 86'; Griffiths (yellow card) 65'; Sass-Davies (yellow card) 90+5'	Report	Norwood (yellow card) 14'; Bakinson (yellow card) 33'; Thompson (yellow card) 40'; Chaplin 45+2'	Stadium: Mornflake Stadium; Attendance: 4,986; Referee: Simon Mather

30 April 2022 46	Ipswich Town	4–0	Charlton Athletic	Ipswich
12:30 BST	Bakinson 7'; Burns 11', 50'; Norwood 88'	Report	Dobson (yellow card) 48'	Stadium: Portman Road; Attendance: 26,002; Referee: Charles Breakspear

=== FA Cup ===
Ipswich Town were drawn at home to Oldham Athletic in the first round and Barrow in the second round.

6 November 2021 First round	Ipswich Town	1–1	Oldham Athletic	Ipswich
15:00 GMT	Burns 8'; Morsy (yellow card) 34'; Donacien (yellow card) 54'	Report	Keillor-Dunn 41'; Bahamboula (penalty missed) 55', (yellow card) 62'; McGahey (yellow card) 60'	Stadium: Portman Road; Attendance: 8,845; Referee: Neil Hair

16 November 2021 First round replay	Oldham Athletic	1–2	Ipswich Town	Oldham
19:45 GMT	Clarke (yellow card) 22'; McGahey 29'; Keillor-Dunn (yellow card) 59'	Report	Woolfenden (yellow card) 27'; Chaplin 36'; El Mizouni 81'	Stadium: Boundary Park; Referee: Carl Boyeson

4 December 2021 Second round	Ipswich Town	0–0	Barrow	Ipswich
15:00 GMT	El Mizouni (yellow card) 33'; Chaplin (yellow card) 56'; Morsy (yellow card) 71'	Report	Brown (yellow card) 56'	Stadium: Portman Road; Attendance: 6,425; Referee: Sam Purkiss

15 December 2021 Second round replay	Barrow	2–0	Ipswich Town	Barrow-in-Furness
19:45 GMT	Stevens 26'; Gotts 35'	Report	Morsy (yellow card) 66'	Stadium: The Dune Hotel Stadium; Attendance: 2,756; Referee: James Bell

=== EFL Cup ===
Ipswich Town were drawn at home to Newport County in the first round.

10 August 2021 First round	Ipswich Town	0–1	Newport County	Ipswich
19:45 BST	Aluko (yellow card) 21'	Report	Abraham 4'; Livermore (yellow card) 42'; Collins (yellow card) 78'	Stadium: Portman Road; Attendance: 6,144; Referee: Neil Hair

=== EFL Trophy ===
Ipswich were drawn into Group A of the Southern section alongside Colchester United, Gillingham and West Ham United U21s. On July 7, the fixtures for the group stage round was confirmed.

Pos	Div	Team	Pld	W	PW	PL	L	GF	GA	GD	Pts	Qualification
1	L1	Ipswich Town	3	1	1	0	1	3	2	+1	5	Advance to Round 2
2	L2	Colchester United	3	1	0	1	1	1	1	0	4	Advance to Round 2
3	ACA	West Ham United U21	3	2	0	0	1	4	2	+2	3 (Note: West Ham U21 deducted 3 points for fielding an ineligible player in their match with Gillingham.)	
4	L1	Gillingham	3	1	0	0	2	1	4	−3	3	

Source: EFL.com
Notes:

14 September 2021 Group game 1	Ipswich Town	1–2	West Ham United U21	Ipswich
19:45 BST	Norwood 2'; El Mizouni (yellow card) 45+1'; Morsy (yellow card) 87'; Holý (yellow card) 88'	Report	Appiah-Forson 12'; Alese (yellow card) 22'; Oko-Flex (yellow card) 48', (goal) 89' (pen.); Ekwah (yellow card) 52' (yellow-red card) 90+3'	Stadium: Portman Road; Attendance: 4,231; Referee: Charles Breakspear

5 October 2021 Group game 2	Gillingham	0–2	Ipswich Town	Gillingham
19:00 BST	McKenzie (yellow card) 58'; Akehurst (yellow card) 66'	Report	Pigott 43'; Harper (yellow card) 57'; Chaplin 72'; El Mizouni (yellow card) 85'	Stadium: Priestfield Stadium; Attendance: 1,116; Referee: Trevor Kettle

9 November 2021 Group game 3	Ipswich Town	0–0 (4–3 p)	Colchester United	Ipswich
19:45 GMT	Fraser (yellow card) 80'	Report	Coxe (yellow card) 90'	Stadium: Portman Road; Attendance: 8,100; Referee: Paul Howard
	Penalties
	Pigott (penalty missed); Chaplin (penalty scored); Harper (penalty scored); Celina (penalty scored); Aluko (penalty scored)		Sears (penalty missed); Chilvers (penalty scored); Hannant (penalty scored); Coxe (penalty scored); Cooper (penalty missed)

1 December 2021 Second round	Ipswich Town	2–2 (3–4 p)	Arsenal U21	Ipswich
19:45 GMT	Jackson 31', 43'; Donacien (yellow card) 90+1'	Report	Patino (yellow card) 34'; Vincent-Young 68' (o.g.); Balogun 71'; Rekik (yellow card) 83'	Stadium: Portman Road; Attendance: 4,065; Referee: Brett Huxtable
	Penalties
	Evans (penalty scored); Chaplin (penalty scored); Celina (penalty missed); Pigott (penalty missed); Jackson (penalty scored)		Balogun (penalty scored); Oulad M'Hand (penalty scored); Rekik (penalty missed); Biereth (penalty scored); Hutchinson (penalty scored)

== Transfers ==
=== Transfers in ===
Date	Position	Nationality	Name	From	Fee	Ref.
3 June 2021	RW	(Wales)	Wes Burns	(England) Fleetwood Town	Undisclosed	
16 June 2021	MF	(England)	Callum Page	(England) Needham Market	Undisclosed	
25 June 2021	CM	(England)	Rekeem Harper	(England) West Bromwich Albion	Undisclosed (Note: Fee reported as £500,000, potentially rising to £1,000,000 with add-ons)	
28 June 2021	GK	(Czech Republic)	Václav Hladký	(England) Salford City	Undisclosed	
1 July 2021	CM	(Wales)	Lee Evans	(England) Wigan Athletic	Free transfer	
1 July 2021	LB	(England)	Matt Penney	(England) Sheffield Wednesday	Free transfer	
12 July 2021	CF	(England)	Joe Pigott	(England) AFC Wimbledon	Free transfer	
14 July 2021	AM	(Scotland)	Scott Fraser	(England) Milton Keynes Dons	Undisclosed	
27 July 2021	CB	(England)	George Edmundson	(Scotland) Rangers	Undisclosed (Note: Fee reported as £750,000)	
27 July 2021	SS	(England)	Conor Chaplin	(England) Barnsley	Undisclosed (Note: Fee reported as £750,000)	
6 August 2021	SS	(Nigeria)	Sone Aluko	(England) Reading	Free transfer	
9 August 2021	LM	(England)	Kyle Edwards	(England) West Bromwich Albion	Free transfer	
15 August 2021	CB	(Australia)	Cameron Burgess	(England) Accrington Stanley	Undisclosed (Note: Fee reported as £750,000)	
16 August 2021	CM	(England)	Tom Carroll	(England) Queens Park Rangers	Free transfer	
31 August 2021	DM	(Egypt)	Sam Morsy	(England) Middlesbrough	Undisclosed	
27 September 2021	CF	(Australia)	Tete Yengi	(Australia) Newcastle Jets	Free transfer	
19 January 2022	GK	(England)	Christian Walton	(England) Brighton & Hove Albion	Undisclosed	
31 January 2022	GK	(England)	Nick Hayes	(England) Hemel Hempstead Town	Undisclosed	

=== Loans in ===
Date from	Position	Nationality	Name	From	Date until	Ref.
26 June 2021	CF	(Zimbabwe)	Macauley Bonne	(England) Queens Park Rangers	End of season	
6 August 2021	CF	(England)	Louie Barry	(England) Aston Villa	3 January 2022	
9 August 2021	LB	(England)	Hayden Coulson	(England) Middlesbrough	31 January 2022 (Note: On 31 January, Coulson was recalled back to Middlesbrough.)	
30 August 2021	GK	(England)	Christian Walton	(England) Brighton & Hove Albion	19 January 2022 (Note: On 19 January, Walton's loan move was made permanent.)	
31 August 2021	AM	(Kosovo)	Bersant Celina	(France) Dijon	End of season	
20 January 2022	CM	(England)	Tyreeq Bakinson	(England) Bristol City	End of season	
27 January 2022	LB	(England)	Dominic Thompson	(England) Brentford	End of season	

=== Loans out ===
Date from	Position	Nationality	Name	To	Date until	Ref.
31 July 2021	CF	(England)	Tyreece Simpson	(England) Swindon Town	23 January 2022	
21 August 2021	CB	(Republic of Ireland)	Corrie Ndaba	(England) Salford City	End of season	
26 August 2021	DM	(England)	Brett McGavin	(England) King's Lynn Town	End of season	
31 August 2021	RW	(Albania)	Armando Dobra	(England) Colchester United	End of season	
26 October 2021	GK	(Czech Republic)	Tomáš Holý	(England) Cambridge United	2 November 2021	
20 January 2022	LB	(England)	Myles Kenlock	(England) Colchester United	End of season	
27 January 2022	GK	(Czech Republic)	Tomáš Holý	(England) Port Vale	End of season	
31 January 2022	LB	(England)	Bailey Clements	(England) Stevenage	End of season	
31 January 2022	MF	(Republic of Ireland)	Matt Healy	(Republic of Ireland) Cork City	End of season	
31 January 2022	CF	(England)	Ben Morris	(Sweden) GAIS	November 2022	
31 January 2022	CM	(England)	Rekeem Harper	(England) Crewe Alexandra	End of season	
6 April 2022	CF	(Australia)	Tete Yengi	(Finland) Vaasan Palloseura	September 2022	

=== Transfers out ===
Date	Position	Nationality	Name	To	Fee	Ref.
11 June 2021	GK	(Wales)	David Cornell	(England) Peterborough United	Mutual consent	
15 June 2021	CM	(England)	Andre Dozzell	(England) Queens Park Rangers	£1,000,000	
21 June 2021	CF	(England)	Oliver Hawkins	(England) Mansfield Town	Undisclosed	
25 June 2021	RW	(England)	Jack Lankester	(England) Cambridge United	Undisclosed	
28 June 2021	CF	(Republic of Ireland)	Aaron Drinan	(England) Leyton Orient	Undisclosed	
30 June 2021	CF	(England)	Kai Brown	(England) Welling United	Released	
30 June 2021	CF	(England)	Zak Brown	(England) Felixstowe & Walton United	Released	
30 June 2021	CB	(England)	Luke Chambers	(England) Colchester United	Released	
30 June 2021	LW	(Wales)	Gwion Edwards	(England) Wigan Athletic	Free transfer	
30 June 2021	CF	(Australia)	Ben Folami	(Australia) Melbourne Victory	Released	
30 June 2021	DM	(Wales)	Emyr Huws	(England) Colchester United	Released	
30 June 2021	AM	(Republic of Ireland)	Alan Judge	(England) Colchester United	Released	
30 June 2021	DM	(England)	Tristan Nydam	Retired		
30 June 2021	GK	(Wales)	Adam Przybek	(England) Wycombe Wanderers	Released	
30 June 2021	LW	(England)	Freddie Sears	(England) Colchester United	Released	
30 June 2021	DM	(England)	Cole Skuse	(England) Colchester United	Released	
30 June 2021	CM	(France)	Allan Viral	(Norway) Flekkerøy IL	Released	
30 June 2021	LB	(Republic of Ireland)	Stephen Ward	(England) Walsall	Released	
30 June 2021	CB	(Wales)	James Wilson	(England) Plymouth Argyle	Released	
30 June 2021	GK	(England)	Harry Wright	(England) Fleetwood Town	Released	
23 July 2021	CM	(England)	Liam Gibbs	(England) Norwich City	Compensation (Note: Fee reported as £600,000)	
27 July 2021	CM	(England)	Teddy Bishop	(England) Lincoln City	Undisclosed (Note: Fee reported as £220,000)	
10 August 2021	CM	(England)	Flynn Downes	(Wales) Swansea City	Undisclosed (Note: Fee reported as £1,500,000, potentially rising to £2,000,000 with add-ons)	
14 January 2022	CB	(Democratic Republic of the Congo)	Aristote Nsiala	(England) Fleetwood Town	Undisclosed	
31 January 2022	CM	(England)	Jon Nolan	(England) Bristol Rovers	Mutual consent	
31 January 2022	AM	(Scotland)	Scott Fraser	(England) Charlton Athletic	Undisclosed	

=== New contracts ===
==== First-team ====
Date signed	Number	Position	Nationality	Name	Contract length	Expiry	Ref.
27 August 2021	15	CB	(Republic of Ireland)	Corrie Ndaba	2 years	2023	
9 November 2021	16	CM	(Tunisia)	Idris El Mizouni	2.5 years	2024	
18 November 2021	44	RB	(Saint Lucia)	Janoi Donacien	1 year	2023	
16 May 2022	7	RW	(Wales)	Wes Burns	3 years	2025	
17 May 2022	19	CF	(England)	Kayden Jackson	2 years	2024	
18 May 2022	—	CM	(England)	Tommy Hughes	6 months	2022	
18 May 2022	6	CB	(England)	Luke Woolfenden	3 years	2025	

==== Academy ====
Date signed	Number	Position	Nationality	Name	Contract length	Expiry	Ref.
9 June 2021	42	CF	(England)	Ben Morris	1 year	2022	
9 June 2021	33	LB	(England)	Bailey Clements	1 year	2022	
9 June 2021	–	GK	(Poland)	Antoni Bort	1 year	2022	
9 June 2021	–	CB	(England)	Brooklyn Kabongolo	1 year	2022	
9 June 2021	–	CM	(England)	Alfie Cutbush	1 year	2022	
9 June 2021	36	CM	(England)	Fraser Alexander	1 year	2022	
9 June 2021	–	CF	(England)	Harley Curtis	1 year	2022	
16 June 2021	34	CB	(England)	Albie Armin	2 years	2023	
16 June 2021	30	CM	(England)	Cameron Humphreys	2 years	2023	
16 June 2021	–	CF	(Nigeria)	Ola Bello	1 year	2022	
6 July 2021	51	CM	(Republic of Ireland)	Matt Healy	1 year	2022	
6 July 2021	48	CM	(England)	Zanda Siziba	2 years	2023	
6 July 2021	–	CB	(Northern Ireland)	Cameron Stewart	1 year	2022	
21 October 2021	–	CM	(England)	Jack Manly	3 years	2024	
8 June 2022	30	CM	(England)	Cameron Humphreys	3 years	2025	
16 June 2022	47	CB	(Indonesia)	Elkan Baggott	3 years	2025	

== Squad statistics ==
All statistics updated as of end of season

=== Appearances and goals ===
No.	Pos	Nat	Player	Total		League One		FA Cup		EFL Cup		EFL Trophy	
No.	Pos	Nat	Player	Apps	Goals	Apps	Goals	Apps	Goals	Apps	Goals	Apps	Goals
Goalkeepers
28	GK	(England) ENG	Christian Walton	38	0	34	0	4	0	0	0	0	0
31	GK	(Czech Republic) CZE	Václav Hladký	14	0	12	0	0	0	0	0	2	0
Defenders
3	DF	(England) ENG	Matt Penney	26	1	18+4	1	1+1	0	0	0	2	0
5	DF	(England) ENG	George Edmundson	34	2	32	2	2	0	0	0	0	0
6	DF	(England) ENG	Luke Woolfenden	38	0	30+1	0	1+1	0	1	0	4	0
12	DF	(England) ENG	Dominic Thompson	17	0	15+2	0	0	0	0	0	0	0
24	DF	(England) ENG	Kane Vincent-Young	22	0	11+4	0	2+1	0	0	0	4	0
26	DF	(Australia) AUS	Cameron Burgess	27	0	18+3	0	3+1	0	0	0	2	0
34	DF	(England) ENG	Albie Armin	1	0	0	0	0	0	0	0	1	0
44	DF	(Saint Lucia) LCA	Janoi Donacien	48	0	40+3	0	1+2	0	1	0	0+1	0
47	DF	(Indonesia) IDN	Elkan Baggott	2	0	2	0	0	0	0	0	0	0
Midfielders
7	MF	(Wales) WAL	Wes Burns	40	13	34+3	12	2	1	0	0	0+1	0
8	MF	(Wales) WAL	Lee Evans	29	3	26+1	3	1	0	0	0	0+1	0
12	MF	(England) ENG	Tyreeq Bakinson	17	2	14+3	2	0	0	0	0	0	0
16	MF	(Tunisia) TUN	Idris El Mizouni	12	1	3+2	0	3	1	1	0	3	0
25	MF	(England) ENG	Tom Carroll	17	0	8+6	0	1	0	0	0	2	0
30	MF	(England) ENG	Cameron Humphreys	4	0	0+2	0	0+1	0	1	0	0	0
43	MF	(Kosovo) KOS	Bersant Celina	35	6	23+9	6	1	0	0	0	0+2	0
48	MF	(England) ENG	Zanda Siziba	2	0	0	0	0	0	0	0	0+2	0
55	MF	(Egypt) EGY	Sam Morsy	38	3	33+1	3	2+1	0	0	0	1	0
Forwards
9	FW	(England) ENG	Joe Pigott	29	3	10+12	2	1+2	0	0	0	3+1	1
10	FW	(England) ENG	James Norwood	27	7	12+11	6	1	0	0+1	0	1+1	1
18	FW	(Zimbabwe) ZIM	Macauley Bonne	46	12	29+14	12	2	0	1	0	0	0
19	FW	(England) ENG	Kayden Jackson	19	5	7+5	3	2+1	0	0+1	0	3	2
21	FW	(England) ENG	Conor Chaplin	47	11	24+15	9	2+2	1	0	0	2+2	1
23	FW	(Nigeria) NGA	Sone Aluko	36	3	18+12	3	2+2	0	1	0	1	0
29	FW	(England) ENG	Kyle Edwards	22	0	11+7	0	1+1	0	0	0	2	0
Players transferred out during the season
1	GK	(Czech Republic) CZE	Tomáš Holý	3	0	0	0	0	0	1	0	2	0
4	MF	(England) ENG	Rekeem Harper	18	0	6+7	0	1+1	0	0	0	3	0
11	MF	(Scotland) SCO	Scott Fraser	20	1	14+1	1	3	0	0+1	0	0+1	0
12	FW	(England) ENG	Louie Barry	6	0	1+1	0	0	0	1	0	2+1	0
14	MF	(Albania) ALB	Armando Dobra	3	0	1+1	0	0	0	1	0	0	0
15	DF	(Republic of Ireland) IRL	Corrie Ndaba	1	0	0	0	0	0	1	0	0	0
20	MF	(England) ENG	Jon Nolan	0	0	0	0	0	0	0	0	0	0
22	DF	(Democratic Republic of the Congo) COD	Aristote Nsiala	15	0	10+1	0	3	0	0	0	1	0
27	DF	(England) ENG	Hayden Coulson	6	0	6	0	0	0	0	0	0	0
33	DF	(England) ENG	Bailey Clements	8	0	4	0	2	0	1	0	0+1	0
40	DF	(England) ENG	Myles Kenlock	2	0	0	0	0	0	0	0	2	0

Last updated: end of season
Source: Competitions

=== Goalscorers ===
No.	Pos	Nat	Player	League One	FA Cup	EFL Cup	EFL Trophy	Total
7	MF	(Wales)	Wes Burns	12	1	0	0	13
18	FW	(Zimbabwe)	Macauley Bonne	12	0	0	0	12
21	FW	(England)	Conor Chaplin	9	1	0	1	11
10	FW	(England)	James Norwood	6	0	0	1	7
43	MF	(Kosovo)	Bersant Celina	6	0	0	0	6
19	FW	(England)	Kayden Jackson	3	0	0	2	5
8	MF	(Wales)	Lee Evans	3	0	0	0	3
9	FW	(England)	Joe Pigott	2	0	0	1	3
23	FW	(Nigeria)	Sone Aluko	3	0	0	0	3
55	MF	(Egypt)	Sam Morsy	3	0	0	0	3
5	DF	(England)	George Edmundson	2	0	0	0	2
12	MF	(England)	Tyreeq Bakinson	2	0	0	0	2
3	DF	(England)	Matt Penney	1	0	0	0	1
11	MF	(Scotland)	Scott Fraser	1	0	0	0	1
16	MF	(Tunisia)	Idris El Mizouni	0	1	0	0	1
Own goal				2	0	0	0	2
Total				67	3	0	5	75

=== Assists ===
No.	Pos	Nat	Player	League One	FA Cup	EFL Cup	EFL Trophy	Total
7	MF	(Wales)	Wes Burns	6	0	0	0	6
43	MF	(Kosovo)	Bersant Celina	6	0	0	0	6
44	DF	(Saint Lucia)	Janoi Donacien	5	0	0	0	5
55	MF	(Egypt)	Sam Morsy	5	0	0	0	5
18	Fw	(Zimbabwe)	Macauley Bonne	3	1	0	0	4
19	FW	(England)	Kayden Jackson	3	0	0	1	4
24	DF	(England)	Kane Vincent-Young	4	0	0	0	4
8	MF	(Wales)	Lee Evans	3	0	0	0	3
10	FW	(England)	James Norwood	3	0	0	0	3
21	FW	(England)	Conor Chaplin	3	0	0	0	3
3	DF	(England)	Matt Penney	1	0	0	1	2
5	DF	(England)	George Edmundson	2	0	0	0	2
11	MF	(Scotland)	Scott Fraser	2	0	0	0	2
4	MF	(England)	Rekeem Harper	1	0	0	0	1
9	FW	(England)	Joe Pigott	0	0	0	1	1
27	DF	(England)	Hayden Coulson	1	0	0	0	1
30	MF	(England)	Cameron Humphreys	1	0	0	0	1
Total				47	1	0	3	51

=== Clean sheets ===
No.	Nat	Player	League One	FA Cup	EFL Cup	EFL Trophy	Total
1	(Czech Republic)	Tomáš Holý	0	0	0	1	1
28	(England)	Christian Walton	14	1	0	0	15
31	(Czech Republic)	Václav Hladký	3	0	0	1	4
Total			17	1	0	2	20

=== Disciplinary record ===
No.	Pos	Nat	Player	League One		FA Cup		EFL Cup		EFL Trophy		Total	
No.	Pos	Nat	Player	Booked	Sent off (straight red)	Booked	Sent off (straight red)	Booked	Sent off (straight red)	Booked	Sent off (straight red)	Booked	Sent off (straight red)
1	GK	(Czech Republic)	Tomáš Holý	0	0	0	0	0	0	1	0	1	0
3	DF	(England)	Matt Penney	2	0	0	0	0	0	0	0	2	0
4	MW	(England)	Rekeem Harper	0	0	0	0	0	0	1	0	1	0
5	DF	(England)	George Edmundson	7	0	0	0	0	0	0	0	7	0
6	DF	(England)	Luke Woolfenden	6	0	1	0	0	0	0	0	7	0
7	MF	(Wales)	Wes Burns	8	0	0	0	0	0	0	0	8	0
8	MF	(Wales)	Lee Evans	4	0	0	0	0	0	0	0	4	0
9	FW	(England)	Joe Pigott	1	0	0	0	0	0	0	0	1	0
10	FW	(England)	James Norwood	6	0	0	0	0	0	0	0	6	0
11	MF	(Scotland)	Scott Fraser	2	0	0	0	0	0	1	0	3	0
12	MF	(England)	Tyreeq Bakinson	5	0	0	0	0	0	0	0	5	0
16	MF	(Tunisia)	Idris El Mizouni	1	0	1	0	0	0	2	0	4	0
18	FW	(Zimbabwe)	Macauley Bonne	3	0	0	0	0	0	0	0	3	0
21	FW	(England)	Conor Chaplin	3	0	1	0	0	0	0	0	4	0
22	DF	(Democratic Republic of the Congo)	Aristote Nsiala	2	0	0	0	0	0	0	0	2	0
22	DF	(England)	Dominic Thompson	3	0	0	0	0	0	0	0	3	0
23	FW	(Nigeria)	Sone Aluko	1	0	0	0	1	0	0	0	2	0
24	DF	(England)	Kane Vincent-Young	3	1	0	0	0	0	0	0	3	1
25	MF	(England)	Tom Carroll	1	0	0	0	0	0	0	0	1	0
26	DF	(Australia)	Cameron Burgess	3	1	0	0	0	0	0	0	3	1
28	GK	(England)	Christian Walton	1	0	0	0	0	0	0	0	1	0
31	GK	(Czech Republic)	Václav Hladký	1	0	0	0	0	0	0	0	1	0
33	DF	(England)	Bailey Clements	2	0	0	0	0	0	0	0	2	0
43	MF	(Kosovo)	Bersant Celina	6	0	0	0	0	0	0	0	6	0
44	DF	(Saint Lucia)	Janoi Donacien	6	0	1	0	0	0	1	0	8	0
55	MF	(Egypt)	Sam Morsy	11	0	3	0	0	0	1	0	15	0
Total				87	2	7	0	1	0	7	0	102	2

=== Captains ===
No.	Nat	Player	League One	FA Cup	EFL Cup	EFL Trophy	Total	Notes
5	(England)	George Edmundson	4	0	0	0	4	
8	(Wales)	Lee Evans	7	0	0	0	7	
18	(Zimbabwe)	Macauley Bonne	1	0	0	0	1	
22	(Democratic Republic of the Congo)	Aristote Nsiala	0	0	0	1	1	
23	(Nigeria)	Sone Aluko	0	2	0	1	3	
26	(Australia)	Cameron Burgess	0	0	0	1	1	
44	(Saint Lucia)	Janoi Donacien	1	0	1	0	2	
55	(Egypt)	Sam Morsy	33	2	0	1	36	Club captain

== Awards ==
=== Player awards ===
Award	Player	Ref
Player of the Year	(Wales) Wes Burns	
Players' Player of the Year	(Wales) Wes Burns	
Young Player of the Year	(England) Cameron Humphreys	
Goal of the Season	(Kosovo) Bersant Celina	

=== EFL League One Goal of the Month ===
Award	Player	Ref
November	(Kosovo) Bersant Celina	

=== PFA Fans' League One Player of the Month ===
Month	Player	Ref
December	(England) James Norwood	
January	(Wales) Wes Burns	

=== EFL League One Team of the Season ===
Player	Ref
(Wales) Wes Burns	
