= Zanda Siziba =

Zimbabwean footballer (born 2003)

Personal information
- Full name: Zandazenkosi Dumisle Opeyemi Adebayo Siziba
- Date of birth: 19 July 2003 (age 23)
- Place of birth: Hackney, England
- Position: Midfielder

Youth career
- 2012–2016: Dagenham & Redbridge
- 2016–2019: Tottenham Hotspur
- 2019–2020: Ipswich Town

Senior career*
Years	Team	Apps	(Gls)
2020–2023	Ipswich Town	0	(0)
2023	Yeovil Town	6	(1)
2023–2025	York City	14	(2)
2024	→ Blyth Spartans (loan)	6	(3)
2024	→ Spennymoor Town (loan)	6	(1)
2025	→ Hampton & Richmond Borough (loan)	13	(3)
2025–2026	Kidderminster Harriers	11	(1)
2026–	Bedford Town		
- * Club domestic league appearances and goals as of 15:47 29 January 2026 (UTC)

Zandazenkosi Dumisle Opeyemi Adebayo Siziba (born 19 July 2003) is a footballer who plays as a midfielder for National League North club Bedford Town.

== Career ==
After playing for Dagenham & Redbridge and Tottenham Hotspur at youth level, he joined Ipswich Town on a two-year scholarship in 2019.

He made his senior debut for Ipswich Town on 6 October 2020 as a substitute in a 2–0 EFL Trophy victory over Gillingham, before making his full debut against Crawley Town in the EFL Trophy the following month.

On 6 July 2021, Siziba signed his first professional contract with Ipswich, signing a two-year deal with the option of an additional one-year extension.

In March 2023, Siziba signed permanently for National League side Yeovil Town agreeing a two-year deal.

On 30 June 2023, Siziba's contract with Yeovil was terminated by mutual consent and subsequently signed for York City.

On 23 February 2024, Siziba joined Blyth Spartans on an initial one-month loan deal.

In August 2024, he signed for National League North side Spennymoor Town on a short-term loan deal.

In February 2025, he joined National League South side Hampton & Richmond Borough on loan for the remainder of the season.

On 1 August 2025, Siziba joined National League North club Kidderminster Harriers having impressed on trial during pre-season. He departed the club on 2 January 2026 following the expiry of his contract.

On 8 January 2026, Siziba signed for National League North club Bedford Town.

== Style of play ==
Siziba usually plays as a winger but can also play as a deep-lying playmaker. He is right-footed with his style of play having been positively compared to that of Liverpool winger Sadio Mane.

== Personal life ==
He was born in Hackney London

== Career statistics ==
As of match played 3 September 2024

Appearances and goals by club, season and competition
Club	Season	League			FA Cup		EFL Cup		Other		Total	
Club	Season	Division	Apps	Goals	Apps	Goals	Apps	Goals	Apps	Goals	Apps	Goals
Ipswich Town	2020–21	League One	0	0	0	0	0	0	2 (Note: Appearances in EFL Trophy)	0	2	0
Ipswich Town	2021–22	League One	0	0	0	0	0	0	2	0	2	0
Ipswich Town	2022–23	League One	0	0	0	0	0	0	2	0	2	0
Ipswich Town	Total		0	0	0	0	0	0	6	0	6	0
Yeovil Town	2022–23	National League	6	1	—		—		—		6	1
York City	2023–24	National League	15	2	3	0	—		1 (Note: Appearance in FA Trophy)	1	19	3
York City	2024–25	National League	0	0	0	0	—		0	0	0	0
York City	Total		15	2	3	0	—		1	1	19	3
Blyth Spartans (loan)	2023–24	National League North	6	3	—		—		—		6	3
Spennymoor Town (loan)	2024–25	National League North	6	1	—		—		—		6	1
Career total			33	7	3	0	0	0	7	1	43	8
