= Bailey Clements =

English footballer (born 2000)

Personal information
- Full name: Bailey James Clements
- Date of birth: 15 November 2000 (age 25)
- Place of birth: Ipswich, England
- Position: Left-back

Team information
- Current team: King's Lynn Town
- Number: 3

Youth career
- 2008–2019: Ipswich Town

Senior career*
Years	Team	Apps	(Gls)
2019–2022	Ipswich Town	4	(0)
2019–2020	→ Hemel Hempstead Town (loan)	0	(0)
2020–2021	→ Dagenham & Redbridge (loan)	0	(0)
2022	→ Stevenage (loan)	4	(0)
2022–2024	Chesterfield	20	(3)
2024–2025	Hornchurch	15	(0)
2025–	King's Lynn Town	0	(0)
- * Club domestic league appearances and goals as of 15:01, 1 June 2025 (UTC)

Bailey James Clements (born 15 November 2000) is an English professional footballer who plays as a left-back for National League North club King's Lynn Town.

== Career ==
=== Ipswich Town ===
Clements joined the Ipswich Town academy at the age of 7, he progressed through the youth set up at Portman Road, including captaining the club's U16 team. He signed his first professional contract on 18 August 2018, signing an 2-year deal. He made his first-team debut for the club in a 3–1 loss to Luton Town in an EFL Cup first round tie, on 13 August 2019. On 8 November 2019, he joined National League South side Hemel Hempstead Town on a one-month loan deal. On 27 February 2020, Ipswich took up the one-year extension option on Clements' contract, extending his stay at the club until 2021.

==== Dagenham & Redbridge (loan) ====
On 4 September, Clements joined National League side Dagenham & Redbridge on loan until January 2021. He left the Daggers in January 2021 after having appeared just once for the club in a FA Trophy game against Ebbsfleet United.

==== Return to Ipswich ====
In June 2021, Clements signed a new one-year contract at Ipswich, with the option of an additional years' extension. He made his first appearance of the 2021–22 season in a 0–1 EFL Cup defeat against Newport County on 10 August. On 13 November, Clements made his league debut for Ipswich in a 0–0 home draw with Oxford United at Portman Road. Clements was released by the club at the end of the 2021–22 season.

==== Stevenage (loan) ====
On 31 January 2022, Clements joined League Two side Stevenage on loan until the end of the 2021–22 season.

=== Chesterfield ===
On 18 June 2022, Clements agreed to join National League club Chesterfield upon the expiration of his Ipswich Town contract.

=== Hornchurch ===
On 9 August 2024, Clements joined National League South club Hornchurch.

== Career statistics ==
As of match played 19 February 2022

Appearances and goals by club, season and competition
Club	Season	Division	League		FA Cup		EFL Cup		Other		Total	
Club	Season	Division	Apps	Goals	Apps	Goals	Apps	Goals	Apps	Goals	Apps	Goals
Ipswich Town	2019–20	League One	0	0	0	0	1	0	0	0	1	0
Ipswich Town	2020–21	League One	0	0	0	0	0	0	0	0	0	0
Ipswich Town	2021–22	League One	4	0	2	0	1	0	1 (Note: Appearance in EFL Trophy)	0	8	0
Ipswich Town	Total		4	0	2	0	2	0	1	0	9	0
Hemel Hempstead Town (loan)	2019–20	National League South	0	0	0	0	—		0	0	0	0
Dagenham & Redbridge (loan)	2020–21	National League	0	0	0	0	—		1 (Note: Appearance in FA Trophy)	0	1	0
Stevenage (loan)	2021–22	League Two	4	0	—		—		—		4	0
Career total			8	0	2	0	2	0	2	0	14	0

== Honours ==
Chesterfield

- National League: 2023–24
