= List of English football transfers winter 2016–17 =

The 2016–17 winter transfer window for English football transfers opened on 1 January and closed on 1 February 2017. Additionally, players without a club could join at any time, non-League clubs could sign players on loan at any time, and clubs could sign a goalkeeper on an emergency loan if they had no registered goalkeeper available. This list includes transfers featuring at least one Premier League or Championship club which were completed after the end of the summer 2016 transfer window and before the end of the 2016–17 winter window.

== Transfers ==
All clubs without a flag are English. Note that while Cardiff City, Swansea City, Newport County and Wrexham are affiliated with the Football Association of Wales and thus take the Welsh flag, they play in the English football league system, and so their transfers are included here. Guernsey, who also play in the English league system, are affiliated with the Guernsey Football Association but, as this is treated as a County Football Association, the club does not require a flag.

| Date | Name | Moving from | Moving to | Fee |
|---|---|---|---|---|
| 2 September 2016 | (Nigeria) Victor Anichebe | West Bromwich Albion | Sunderland | Free |
| 2 September 2016 | (Republic of Ireland) Brian Murphy | Unattached | (Wales) Cardiff City | Free |
| 2 September 2016 | (Sweden) Zackarias Faour | Manchester City | (Denmark) Midtjylland | Loan |
| 2 September 2016 | (England) Laurence Bilboe | Rotherham United | Mickleover Sports | Loan |
| 5 September 2016 | (Antigua and Barbuda) Dexter Blackstock | Unattached | Rotherham United | Free |
| 6 September 2016 | (Sweden) Joel Ekstrand | Unattached | Bristol City | Free |
| 6 September 2016 | (Netherlands) Urby Emanuelson | Unattached | Sheffield Wednesday | Free |
| 6 September 2016 | (Greece) Charalampos Mavrias | Sunderland | (Germany) Karlsruher SC | Free |
| 7 September 2016 | (Denmark) Nicklas Bendtner | Unattached | Nottingham Forest | Free |
| 7 September 2016 | (Portugal) Mika | (Portugal) Boavista | Sunderland | Undisclosed |
| 8 September 2016 | (France) Mathieu Flamini | Arsenal | Crystal Palace | Free |
| 16 September 2016 | (England) Jack Cowgill | Barnsley | Braintree Town | Loan |
| 21 September 2016 | (England) Wes Brown | Unattached | Blackburn Rovers | Free |
| 21 September 2016 | (England) Billy Whitehouse | Leeds United | Guiseley | Loan |
| 22 September 2016 | (England) Omari Patrick | Unattached | Barnsley | Free |
| 23 September 2016 | (Republic of Ireland) Frank Mulhern | Leeds United | Southport | Loan |
| 23 September 2016 | (Wales) Rabbi Matondo | (Wales) Cardiff City | Manchester City | Undisclosed |
| 27 September 2016 | (Scotland) Harry Souttar | (Scotland) Dundee United | Stoke City | Undisclosed |
| 30 September 2016 | (Nigeria) Josh Debayo | Unattached | Leicester City | Free |
| 30 September 2016 | (Wales) Eli Phipps | (Wales) Cardiff City | Gloucester City | Loan |
| 6 October 2016 | (Iceland) Sindri Scheving | Reading | Cirencester Town | Loan |
| 10 October 2016 | (Canada) Junior Hoilett | Unattached | (Wales) Cardiff City | Free |
| 10 October 2016 | (England) Kuda Muskwe | Rotherham United | Grantham Town | Loan |
| 11 October 2016 | (Ivory Coast) Sol Bamba | Unattached | (Wales) Cardiff City | Free |
| 11 October 2016 | (Morocco) Marouane Chamakh | Unattached | (Wales) Cardiff City | Free |
| 12 October 2016 | (England) Kieran Richardson | Unattached | (Wales) Cardiff City | Free |
| 12 October 2016 | (England) Aden Baldwin | Bristol City | Weston-super-Mare | Loan |
| 13 October 2016 | (England) Mason Warren | Rotherham United | Grantham Town | Loan |
| 14 October 2016 | (England) Tom Rose | Rotherham United | Sheffield | Loan |
| 14 October 2016 | (England) Fabian Bailey | Rotherham United | Sheffield | Loan |
| 21 October 2016 | (England) Charlie Gatter | Burton Albion | Spalding United | Loan |
| 21 October 2016 | (Wales) Jamie Bird | (Wales) Cardiff City | Weston-super-Mare | Loan |
| 21 October 2016 | (Wales) Lloyd Humphries | (Wales) Cardiff City | Weston-super-Mare | Loan |
| 23 October 2016 | (Kenya) Jonah Ayunga | Brighton & Hove Albion | Burgess Hill Town | Loan |
| 24 October 2016 | (Nigeria) Peter Odemwingie | Unattached | Rotherham United | Free |
| 26 October 2016 | (New Zealand) Monty Patterson | Ipswich Town | Braintree Town | Loan |
| 26 October 2016 | (England) Charlie Cooper | Birmingham City | York City | Loan |
| 11 November 2016 | (England) Kuda Muskwe | Rotherham United | Frickley Athletic | Loan |
| 17 November 2016^{[a]} | (England) Tom Barkhuizen | Morecambe | Preston North End | Compensation |
| 17 November 2016 | (England) Shawn McCoulsky | Bristol City | Torquay United | Loan |
| 18 November 2016 | (England) Alex Finney | Unattached | Queens Park Rangers | Free |
| 25 November 2016 | (Sweden) Tim Erlandsson | Nottingham Forest | Barrow | Loan |
| 25 November 2016 | (Wales) Jake Charles | Barnsley | York City | Loan |
| 25 November 2016 | (England) Bailey Vose | Brighton & Hove Albion | Concord Rangers | Loan |
| 26 November 2016 | (Iceland) Axel Óskar Andrésson | Reading | Bath City | Loan |
| 2 December 2016 | (Scotland) Zak Jules | Reading | Braintree Town | Loan |
| 3 December 2016 | (England) Jake Andrews | Bristol City | Guernsey | Loan |
| 3 December 2016 | (England) Kodi Lyons-Foster | Bristol City | Guernsey | Loan |
| 6 December 2016 | (England) Zech Medley | Chelsea | Arsenal | Free |
| 9 December 2016 | (England) Charlie Cooper | Birmingham City | Forest Green Rovers | Loan |
| 12 December 2016^{[a]} | (Republic of Ireland) Andy Boyle | (Republic of Ireland) Dundalk | Preston North End | Free |
| 12 December 2016^{[a]} | (Republic of Ireland) Daryl Horgan | (Republic of Ireland) Dundalk | Preston North End | Free |
| 12 December 2016 | (Wales) Rollin Menayese | (Wales) Cardiff City | Weston-super-Mare | Free |
| 16 December 2016 | (England) Luke McGee | Tottenham Hotspur | Peterborough United | Loan extension |
| 19 December 2016 | (England) Mason Warren | Rotherham United | Matlock Town | Loan |
| 19 December 2016 | (England) Tom Rose | Rotherham United | Sheffield | Loan extension |
| 20 December 2016^{[c]} | (England) Lukas Jutkiewicz | Burnley | Birmingham City | £1m |
| 22 December 2016 | (England) Dion Conroy | Chelsea | Aldershot Town | Loan extension |
| 23 December 2016^{[a]} | (Brazil) Oscar | Chelsea | (China) Shanghai SIPG | £60m |
| 25 December 2016 | (Iceland) Axel Óskar Andrésson | Reading | Bath City | Loan extension |
| 27 December 2016^{[a]} | (Spain) Pablo Maffeo | Manchester City | (Spain) Girona | Loan |
| 27 December 2016^{[a]} | (England) Callum McManaman | West Bromwich Albion | Sheffield Wednesday | Loan |
| 27 December 2016^{[a]} | (Spain) Angeliño | Manchester City | (Spain) Girona | Loan |
| 29 December 2016 | (England) Niall Mason | Aston Villa | Doncaster Rovers | Loan extension |
| 30 December 2016^{[a]} | (England) Jay Dasilva | Chelsea | Charlton Athletic | Loan |
| 31 December 2016^{[a]} | (England) Hiram Boateng | Crystal Palace | Northampton Town | Loan |
| 31 December 2016^{[a]} | (Jamaica) Chris Humphrey | Preston North End | (Scotland) Hibernian | Free |
| 31 December 2016^{[a]} | (England) Jake Kean | Sheffield Wednesday | Mansfield Town | Loan |
| 31 December 2016^{[a]} | (Netherlands) Elvis Manu | Brighton & Hove Albion | (Netherlands) Go Ahead Eagles | Loan |
| 31 December 2016^{[a]} | (England) Jack Storer | Birmingham City | Yeovil Town | Loan |
| 31 December 2016^{[a]} | (Democratic Republic of the Congo) David Tutonda | (Wales) Cardiff City | Barnet | Free |
| 31 December 2016^{[b]} | (Netherlands) Marco van Ginkel | Chelsea | (Netherlands) PSV | Loan |
| 31 December 2016 | (England) Dean Henderson | Manchester United | Grimsby Town | Loan extension |
| 1 January 2017 | (England) Stuart Beavon | Burton Albion | Coventry City | Free |
| 1 January 2017 | (Italy) Diego De Girolamo | Bristol City | Cheltenham Town | Loan |
| 1 January 2017 | (England) Jonathan Edwards | Hull City | Accrington Stanley | Loan |
| 1 January 2017 | (England) Jaanai Gordon | West Ham United | (Wales) Newport County | Loan |
| 1 January 2017 | (England) Manny Onariase | Brentford | Cheltenham Town | Loan |
| 1 January 2017 | (Republic of Ireland) Callum Reilly | Burton Albion | Coventry City | Loan |
| 1 January 2017 | (England) Harvey Rodgers | Hull City | Accrington Stanley | Loan |
| 1 January 2017 | (Norway) Martin Samuelsen | West Ham United | Peterborough United | Loan |
| 1 January 2017 | (England) Marvin Sordell | Coventry City | Burton Albion | Free |
| 1 January 2017 | (England) Jordan Houghton | Chelsea | Doncaster Rovers | Loan extension |
| 1 January 2017 | (England) Jamal Blackman | Chelsea | Wycombe Wanderers | Loan extension |
| 1 January 2017 | (England) Delial Brewster | Everton | Southport | Loan |
| 1 January 2017 | (England) Max Clark | Hull City | Cambridge United | Loan extension |
| 1 January 2017 | (England) Jason McCarthy | Southampton | Walsall | Loan extension |
| 1 January 2017 | (Scotland) Jack McKay | Leeds United | (Scotland) Airdrieonians | Loan |
| 2 January 2017 | (England) Joey Barton | (Scotland) Rangers | Burnley | Free |
| 2 January 2017 | (England) Ben Davies | Preston North End | Fleetwood Town | Loan |
| 2 January 2017 | (England) Conor Grant | Everton | Doncaster Rovers | Loan |
| 3 January 2017 | (England) Dominic Ball | Rotherham United | Peterborough United | Loan |
| 3 January 2017 | (Republic of Ireland) Josh Cullen | West Ham United | Bradford City | Loan extension |
| 4 January 2017 | (Benin) Rudy Gestede | Aston Villa | Middlesbrough | Undisclosed |
| 4 January 2017 | (England) Lee Grant | Derby County | Stoke City | £1.3m |
| 4 January 2017 | (Bosnia and Herzegovina) Milan Đurić | (Italy) Cesena | Bristol City | Undisclosed |
| 4 January 2017 | (Germany) Jens Hegeler | (Germany) Hertha BSC | Bristol City | Undisclosed |
| 4 January 2017 | (England) Luke Varney | Ipswich Town | Burton Albion | Free |
| 4 January 2017 | (Venezuela) Adalberto Peñaranda | Watford | (Spain) Málaga | Loan |
| 4 January 2017 | (England) Jon Flatt | Wolverhampton Wanderers | Barrow | Loan |
| 5 January 2017 | (England) Ademola Lookman | Charlton Athletic | Everton | £11m |
| 5 January 2017 | (Nigeria) Wilfred Ndidi | (Belgium) Genk | Leicester City | £15m |
| 5 January 2017 | (Belgium) Julien De Sart | Middlesbrough | Derby County | Loan |
| 5 January 2017 | (England) Jake Forster-Caskey | Brighton & Hove Albion | Charlton Athletic | Undisclosed |
| 5 January 2017 | (England) Sam Johnstone | Manchester United | Aston Villa | Loan |
| 5 January 2017 | (England) Alex Jones | Birmingham City | Bradford City | Undisclosed |
| 5 January 2017 | (Republic of Ireland) Sean Kavanagh | Fulham | Hartlepool United | Loan |
| 5 January 2017 | (Nigeria) Freddie Ladapo | Crystal Palace | Shrewsbury Town | Loan |
| 5 January 2017 | (Spain) Tomás Mejías | Middlesbrough | (Spain) Rayo Vallecano | Loan |
| 5 January 2017 | (England) Kyle Jameson | Unattached | Chelsea | Free |
| 5 January 2017 | (Finland) Mikael Soisalo | (Finland) Ilves Tampere | Middlesbrough | Undisclosed |
| 5 January 2017 | (England) William Miller | Tottenham Hotspur | Burton Albion | Loan extension |
| 5 January 2017 | (England) Adam Armstrong | Newcastle United | Barnsley | Loan extension |
| 5 January 2017 | (Wales) Connor Lemonheigh-Evans | Bristol City | Bath City | Loan |
| 5 January 2017 | (England) Cameron Pring | Bristol City | Guernsey | Loan |
| 5 January 2017 | (England) Max O'Leary | Bristol City | Bath City | Loan extension |
| 5 January 2017 | (England) Aden Baldwin | Bristol City | Weston-super-Mare | Loan extension |
| 5 January 2017 | (England) Jake Andrews | Bristol City | Guernsey | Loan extension |
| 5 January 2017 | (Republic of Ireland) Sean Long | Reading | Lincoln City | Loan |
| 6 January 2017 | (Norway) Markus Henriksen | (Netherlands) AZ | Hull City | Undisclosed |
| 6 January 2017 | (England) Isaiah Brown | Chelsea | Huddersfield Town | Loan |
| 6 January 2017 | (Australia) Cameron Burgess | Fulham | Bury | Loan |
| 6 January 2017 | (Wales) Morgan Fox | Charlton Athletic | Sheffield Wednesday | Undisclosed |
| 6 January 2017 | (England) Greg Halford | Rotherham United | (Wales) Cardiff City | Undisclosed |
| 6 January 2017 | (England) Ibrahim Meite | Harrow Borough | (Wales) Cardiff City | Undisclosed |
| 6 January 2017 | (England) Taylor Moore | Bristol City | Bury | Loan |
| 6 January 2017 | (England) Luke Murphy | Leeds United | Burton Albion | Loan |
| 6 January 2017 | (England) Lewis Page | West Ham United | Charlton Athletic | Undisclosed |
| 6 January 2017 | (Australia) Bailey Wright | Preston North End | Bristol City | Undisclosed |
| 6 January 2017 | (Spain) Pedro Chirivella | Liverpool | (Netherlands) Go Ahead Eagles | Loan |
| 6 January 2017 | (Nigeria) John Mikel Obi | Chelsea | (China) Tianjin TEDA | Undisclosed |
| 6 January 2017 | (England) Devante Rodney | Sheffield Wednesday | Hartlepool United | Free |
| 6 January 2017 | (Colombia) Joao Rodríguez | Chelsea | (Colombia) Cortuluá | Loan |
| 6 January 2017 | (Netherlands) Lex Immers | (Wales) Cardiff City | (Belgium) Club Brugge | Free |
| 7 January 2017 | (Wales) Craig Davies | Wigan Athletic | Scunthorpe United | Undisclosed |
| 7 January 2017 | (England) Dominic Gape | Southampton | Wycombe Wanderers | Free |
| 7 January 2017 | (Denmark) Jakob Haugaard | Stoke City | Wigan Athletic | Loan |
| 7 January 2017 | (England) Ryan Loft | Tottenham Hotspur | Stevenage | Loan |
| 7 January 2017 | (England) Harry Toffolo | Norwich City | Scunthorpe United | Loan extension |
| 9 January 2017 | (Scotland) Will Boyle | Huddersfield Town | Cheltenham Town | Free |
| 9 January 2017 | (England) Nathan Byrne | Wigan Athletic | Charlton Athletic | Loan |
| 9 January 2017 | (Spain) Pablo Hernández | (Qatar) Al-Arabi | Leeds United | Undisclosed |
| 9 January 2017 | (England) David Nugent | Middlesbrough | Derby County | Undisclosed |
| 9 January 2017 | (United States) Emerson Hyndman | Bournemouth | (Scotland) Rangers | Loan |
| 9 January 2017 | (England) Sean Longstaff | Newcastle United | (Scotland) Kilmarnock | Loan |
| 9 January 2017 | (England) Callum Roberts | Newcastle United | (Scotland) Kilmarnock | Loan |
| 9 January 2017 | (England) Freddie Woodman | Newcastle United | (Scotland) Kilmarnock | Loan |
| 9 January 2017 | (England) Charlie Cooper | Birmingham City | Forest Green Rovers | Loan extension |
| 10 January 2017 | (England) Cohen Bramall | Hednesford Town | Arsenal | £40,000 |
| 10 January 2017 | (Albania) Flo Bojaj | Huddersfield Town | (Wales) Newport County | Loan |
| 10 January 2017 | (England) Ben Gladwin | Queens Park Rangers | Swindon Town | Loan |
| 10 January 2017 | (Democratic Republic of the Congo) Kazenga LuaLua | Brighton & Hove Albion | Queens Park Rangers | Loan |
| 10 January 2017 | (England) Daniel Crowley | Arsenal | (Netherlands) Go Ahead Eagles | Loan |
| 10 January 2017 | (Sweden) Henrik Johansson | (Sweden) Halmstad | Brentford | Undisclosed |
| 10 January 2017 | (Slovakia) Ľubomír Šatka | Newcastle United | (Slovakia) DAC Dunajská Streda | Loan |
| 11 January 2017 | (England) Charlie Colkett | Chelsea | Swindon Town | Loan |
| 11 January 2017 | (England) Fankaty Dabo | Chelsea | Swindon Town | Loan |
| 11 January 2017 | (Scotland) Islam Feruz | Chelsea | Swindon Town | Loan |
| 11 January 2017 | (England) Craig Gardner | West Bromwich Albion | Birmingham City | Loan |
| 11 January 2017 | (England) Callum Guy | Derby County | Port Vale | Loan |
| 11 January 2017 | (Brazil) Sandro | Queens Park Rangers | (Turkey) Antalyaspor | Undisclosed |
| 11 January 2017 | (Spain) Manu García | Manchester City | (Netherlands) NAC Breda | Loan |
| 12 January 2017 | (England) Tom Cleverley | Everton | Watford | Loan |
| 12 January 2017 | (France) Morgan Schneiderlin | Manchester United | Everton | £20m |
| 12 January 2017 | (England) Alex Gilliead | Newcastle United | Bradford City | Loan |
| 12 January 2017 | (England) George Glendon | Manchester City | Fleetwood Town | Undisclosed |
| 12 January 2017 | (Netherlands) Luciano Narsingh | (Netherlands) PSV | (Wales) Swansea City | Undisclosed |
| 12 January 2017 | (England) Alex Pike | West Ham United | Cheltenham Town | Loan |
| 12 January 2017 | (England) Ivan Toney | Newcastle United | Scunthorpe United | Loan |
| 12 January 2017 | (Spain) Jon Toral | Arsenal | (Scotland) Rangers | Loan |
| 12 January 2017 | (Romania) Sergiu Buș | Sheffield Wednesday | (Romania) Astra Giurgiu | Free |
| 12 January 2017 | (Germany) Sebastian Polter | Queens Park Rangers | (Germany) Union Berlin | Undisclosed |
| 12 January 2017 | (England) Ntumba Massanka | Burnley | (Wales) Wrexham | Loan |
| 12 January 2017 | (England) Tarique Fosu | Reading | Colchester United | Loan extension |
| 13 January 2017 | (Brazil) Evandro | (Portugal) Porto | Hull City | Undisclosed |
| 13 January 2017 | (Senegal) Oumar Niasse | Everton | Hull City | Loan |
| 13 January 2017 | (Ghana) Jeffrey Schlupp | Leicester City | Crystal Palace | £12m |
| 13 January 2017 | (Montserrat) Brandon Comley | Queens Park Rangers | Grimsby Town | Loan extension |
| 13 January 2017 | (England) Brandon Goodship | Bournemouth | Yeovil Town | Free |
| 13 January 2017 | (Wales) Tom James | (Wales) Cardiff City | Yeovil Town | Free |
| 13 January 2017 | (Northern Ireland) Daniel Lafferty | Burnley | Sheffield United | Undisclosed |
| 13 January 2017 | (Republic of Ireland) Ian Lawlor | Manchester City | Doncaster Rovers | Undisclosed |
| 13 January 2017 | (England) Jordan Lee | Bournemouth | Torquay United | Loan |
| 13 January 2017 | (England) Joe Maguire | Liverpool | Fleetwood Town | Undisclosed |
| 13 January 2017 | (Slovakia) Marek Rodák | Fulham | Accrington Stanley | Loan |
| 13 January 2017 | (England) Sam Winnall | Barnsley | Sheffield Wednesday | Undisclosed |
| 13 January 2017 | (Italy) Pierluigi Gollini | Aston Villa | (Italy) Atalanta | Loan |
| 13 January 2017 | (Spain) Jozabed | Fulham | (Spain) Celta Vigo | Loan |
| 13 January 2017 | (Wales) Alex Samuel | (Wales) Swansea City | (Wales) Newport County | Loan |
| 13 January 2017 | (England) Dan Lavercombe | Wigan Athletic | (Wales) Rhyl | Loan |
| 13 January 2017 | (Haiti) Duckens Nazon | Unattached | Wolverhampton Wanderers | Free |
| 13 January 2017 | (Netherlands) Ola John | Wolverhampton Wanderers | (Spain) Deportivo La Coruña | Sub-Loan Agreement |
| 14 January 2017 | (England) Callum Connolly | Everton | Wigan Athletic | Loan |
| 16 January 2017 | (France) Aly Cissokho | Aston Villa | (Greece) Olympiacos | Loan |
| 16 January 2017 | (England) Kieffer Moore | Forest Green Rovers | Ipswich Town | Undisclosed |
| 16 January 2017 | (England) Jordan Spence | Unattached | Ipswich Town | Free |
| 16 January 2017 | (Republic of the Congo) Prince Oniangué | Wolverhampton Wanderers | (France) Bastia | Loan |
| 16 January 2017 | (Cameroon) Paul Garita | Bristol City | Plymouth Argyle | Loan extension |
| 16 January 2017 | (England) Craig Tanner | Reading | Plymouth Argyle | Loan extension |
| 16 January 2017 | (England) Nathan Baxter | Chelsea | Solihull Moors | Loan |
| 16 January 2017 | (Brazil) Lucas Piazon | Chelsea | Fulham | Loan extension |
| 16 January 2017 | (England) Matty Templeton | Barnsley | North Ferriby United | Loan |
| 17 January 2017 | (Sweden) Martin Olsson | Norwich City | (Wales) Swansea City | £4m |
| 17 January 2017 | (England) Tom Carroll | Tottenham Hotspur | (Wales) Swansea City | £4.5m |
| 17 January 2017 | (England) Keshi Anderson | Crystal Palace | Northampton Town | Loan |
| 17 January 2017 | (England) Farrend Rawson | Derby County | Coventry City | Loan |
| 17 January 2017 | (England) Joe Riley | Manchester United | Sheffield United | Loan |
| 17 January 2017 | (Wales) Tyler Roberts | West Bromwich Albion | Shrewsbury Town | Loan |
| 17 January 2017 | (England) Tyler Walker | Nottingham Forest | Port Vale | Loan |
| 17 January 2017^{[d]} | (England) Andre Wright | West Bromwich Albion | Yeovil Town | Loan |
| 18 January 2017 | (Portugal) Filipe Melo | Sheffield Wednesday | (Portugal) Paços de Ferreira | Loan |
| 18 January 2017 | (England) Patrick Bamford | Chelsea | Middlesbrough | £5.5m |
| 18 January 2017 | (Wales) Gethin Jones | Everton | Barnsley | Loan |
| 18 January 2017 | (England) Joe Lumley | Queens Park Rangers | Bristol Rovers | Loan |
| 18 January 2017 | (Equatorial Guinea) Emilio Nsue | Middlesbrough | Birmingham City | Undisclosed |
| 18 January 2017 | (Wales) Eli Phipps | (Wales) Cardiff City | Colchester United | Undisclosed |
| 18 January 2017 | (Scotland) Allan McGregor | Hull City | (Wales) Cardiff City | Loan |
| 18 January 2017 | (Portugal) Tiago Ilori | Liverpool | Reading | Undisclosed |
| 19 January 2017 | (Wales) Wes Burns | Bristol City | Fleetwood Town | Undisclosed |
| 19 January 2017 | (England) Jake Cooper | Reading | Millwall | Loan |
| 19 January 2017 | (England) Antony Evans | Everton | Morecambe | Loan |
| 19 January 2017 | (Germany) Fabian Giefer | (Germany) Schalke 04 | Bristol City | Loan |
| 19 January 2017 | (Mali) Cheick Keita | (Italy) Entella | Birmingham City | Undisclosed |
| 19 January 2017 | (England) Richard O'Donnell | Bristol City | Rotherham United | Undisclosed |
| 19 January 2017 | (England) Jed Wallace | Wolverhampton Wanderers | Millwall | Loan |
| 19 January 2017 | (Austria) Andreas Weimann | Derby County | Wolverhampton Wanderers | Loan |
| 19 January 2017 | (Argentina) Bruno Zuculini | Manchester City | (Italy) Verona | Loan |
| 20 January 2017 | (Norway) Omar Elabdellaoui | (Greece) Olympiacos | Hull City | Loan |
| 20 January 2017 | (England) Saido Berahino | West Bromwich Albion | Stoke City | £12m |
| 20 January 2017 | (England) Jake Livermore | Hull City | West Bromwich Albion | £10m |
| 20 January 2017 | (Portugal) José Fonte | Southampton | West Ham United | £8m |
| 20 January 2017 | (Netherlands) Memphis Depay | Manchester United | (France) Lyon | £16m |
| 20 January 2017 | (England) Harvey Barnes | Leicester City | Milton Keynes Dons | Loan |
| 20 January 2017 | (England) Marcus Browne | West Ham United | Wigan Athletic | Loan |
| 20 January 2017 | (England) Sean Clare | Sheffield Wednesday | Accrington Stanley | Loan |
| 20 January 2017 | (Turkey) Kerim Frei | (Turkey) Beşiktaş | Birmingham City | £2.2m |
| 20 January 2017 | (England) Shayon Harrison | Tottenham Hotspur | Yeovil Town | Loan |
| 20 January 2017 | (England) Henri Lansbury | Nottingham Forest | Aston Villa | £2.75m |
| 20 January 2017 | (England) Bryn Morris | Middlesbrough | Shrewsbury Town | Free |
| 20 January 2017 | (England) Sanmi Odelusi | Wigan Athletic | Blackpool | Loan |
| 20 January 2017 | (Wales) Tommy O'Sullivan | (Wales) Cardiff City | Colchester United | Undisclosed |
| 20 January 2017 | (Germany) Collin Quaner | (Germany) Union Berlin | Huddersfield Town | Undisclosed |
| 20 January 2017 | (England) Sam Saunders | Brentford | Wycombe Wanderers | Free |
| 20 January 2017 | (Republic of Ireland) Ryan Sweeney | Stoke City | Bristol Rovers | Loan |
| 20 January 2017 | (England) Ryan Tunnicliffe | Fulham | Wigan Athletic | Loan |
| 20 January 2017 | (England) Scott Wharton | Blackburn Rovers | Cambridge United | Loan |
| 20 January 2017 | (Scotland) Jake Sheppard | Reading | Dagenham & Redbridge | Loan |
| 20 January 2017 | (England) Kuda Muskwe | Rotherham United | Harrogate Town | Loan |
| 20 January 2017 | (England) Ben O'Hanlon | Wolverhampton Wanderers | Nuneaton Town | Loan |
| 20 January 2017 | (England) Harrison Bennett | Reading | Margate | Loan |
| 20 January 2017 | (England) Aaron Hayden | Wolverhampton Wanderers | Bromley | Loan |
| 20 January 2017 | (England) Ollie Shenton | Stoke City | (Wales) Wrexham | Loan |
| 20 January 2017 | (England) Shaun Hobson | Bournemouth | Eastbourne Borough | Loan |
| 21 January 2017 | (Republic of Ireland) Gerry McDonagh | Nottingham Forest | Cambridge United | Loan |
| 22 January 2017 | (England) Brandon Adams | Queens Park Rangers | (Malaysia) Perlis | Loan |
| 22 January 2017 | (England) Nathan Holland | Everton | West Ham United | Undisclosed |
| 23 January 2017 | (Spain) Gerard Deulofeu | Everton | (Italy) Milan | Loan |
| 23 January 2017 | (France) Toumani Diagouraga | Leeds United | Ipswich Town | Loan |
| 23 January 2017 | (Serbia) Lazar Marković | Liverpool | Hull City | Loan |
| 23 January 2017 | (Spain) Toni Martínez | West Ham United | Oxford United | Loan |
| 23 January 2017 | (England) Dan Scarr | Stourbridge | Birmingham City | Undisclosed |
| 23 January 2017 | (England) Fikayo Tomori | Chelsea | Brighton & Hove Albion | Loan |
| 23 January 2017 | (England) Charles Vernam | Derby County | Coventry City | Loan |
| 24 January 2017 | (Netherlands) Tjaronn Chery | Queens Park Rangers | (China) Guizhou Zhiceng | Undisclosed |
| 24 January 2017 | (Italy) Diego Fabbrini | Birmingham City | (Italy) Spezia | Loan |
| 24 January 2017 | (Spain) Luis Hernández | Leicester City | (Spain) Málaga | Undisclosed |
| 24 January 2017 | (England) Connor Ogilvie | Tottenham Hotspur | Stevenage | Loan |
| 25 January 2017 | (Iceland) Birkir Bjarnason | (Switzerland) Basel | Aston Villa | Undisclosed |
| 25 January 2017 | (England) James Bree | Barnsley | Aston Villa | Undisclosed |
| 25 January 2017 | (England) Jamie Hanson | Derby County | Wigan Athletic | Loan |
| 25 January 2017 | (England) Matty James | Leicester City | Barnsley | Loan |
| 25 January 2017 | (Argentina) Mauro Zárate | (Italy) Fiorentina | Watford | Undisclosed |
| 26 January 2017 | (Poland) Ariel Borysiuk | Queens Park Rangers | (Poland) Lechia Gdańsk | Loan |
| 26 January 2017 | (England) Jonny Burn | Middlesbrough | Bristol Rovers | Undisclosed |
| 26 January 2017 | (England) Joseph Fryer | Middlesbrough | Hartlepool United | Loan |
| 26 January 2017 | (Republic of Ireland) Conor Hourihane | Barnsley | Aston Villa | Undisclosed |
| 26 January 2017 | (England) Stephen Humphrys | Fulham | Shrewsbury Town | Loan |
| 26 January 2017 | (England) Rob Hunt | Brighton & Hove Albion | Oldham Athletic | Loan |
| 26 January 2017 | (France) M'Baye Niang | (Italy) Milan | Watford | Loan |
| 26 January 2017 | (Greece) Athanasios Petsos | (Germany) Werder Bremen | Fulham | Loan |
| 26 January 2017 | (England) Steven Taylor | Unattached | Ipswich Town | Free |
| 27 January 2017 | (England) Luke Amos | Tottenham Hotspur | Southend United | Loan |
| 27 January 2017 | (England) Cameron Brannagan | Liverpool | Fleetwood Town | Loan |
| 27 January 2017 | (Wales) Alex Bray | (Wales) Swansea City | Rotherham United | Loan |
| 27 January 2017 | (Denmark) Lasse Vigen Christensen | Fulham | Burton Albion | Loan |
| 27 January 2017 | (England) Dion Conroy | Chelsea | Swindon Town | Undisclosed |
| 27 January 2017 | (England) Russell Griffiths | Everton | (Scotland) Motherwell | Loan |
| 27 January 2017 | (Netherlands) Florian Jozefzoon | (Netherlands) PSV | Brentford | Undisclosed |
| 27 January 2017 | (England) Mark Kitching | Middlesbrough | Rochdale | Loan |
| 27 January 2017 | (Scotland) Kyle McAllister | (Scotland) St Mirren | Derby County | Undisclosed |
| 27 January 2017 | (England) Luke Maxwell | Birmingham City | Grimsby Town | Loan |
| 27 January 2017 | (England) Alex Mowatt | Leeds United | Barnsley | Undisclosed |
| 27 January 2017 | (England) Danny Rowe | Macclesfield Town | Ipswich Town | Undisclosed |
| 27 January 2017 | (Scotland) Robert Snodgrass | Hull City | West Ham United | £10.2m |
| 27 January 2017 | (Portugal) João Teixeira | (Portugal) Benfica | Nottingham Forest | Loan |
| 27 January 2017 | (England) Cauley Woodrow | Fulham | Burton Albion | Loan |
| 28 January 2017 | (England) Sean Goss | Manchester United | Queens Park Rangers | £500,000 |
| 29 January 2017 | (Spain) Bojan | Stoke City | (Germany) Mainz 05 | Loan |
| 30 January 2017 | (Nigeria) Semi Ajayi | (Wales) Cardiff City | Rotherham United | Loan |
| 30 January 2017 | (England) Chuba Akpom | Arsenal | Brighton & Hove Albion | Loan |
| 30 January 2017 | (England) Tyias Browning | Everton | Preston North End | Loan |
| 30 January 2017 | (Portugal) Hélder Costa | (Portugal) Benfica | Wolverhampton Wanderers | £13m |
| 30 January 2017 | (England) Jordan Flores | Wigan Athletic | Blackpool | Loan |
| 30 January 2017 | (England) Luke Freeman | Bristol City | Queens Park Rangers | Undisclosed |
| 30 January 2017 | (Republic of Ireland) Darron Gibson | Everton | Sunderland | Undisclosed |
| 30 January 2017 | (Scotland) Alex Jakubiak | Watford | Wycombe Wanderers | Loan |
| 30 January 2017 | (Portugal) Lucas João | Sheffield Wednesday | Blackburn Rovers | Loan |
| 30 January 2017 | (England) Chris Long | Burnley | Bolton Wanderers | Loan |
| 30 January 2017 | (Austria) Ivan Lučić | Bristol City | (Denmark) AaB | Loan |
| 30 January 2017 | (Republic of Ireland) Joe Murphy | Huddersfield Town | Bury | Loan |
| 30 January 2017 | (Costa Rica) Bryan Oviedo | Everton | Sunderland | Undisclosed |
| 30 January 2017 | (France) Dimitri Payet | West Ham United | (France) Marseille | £25m |
| 30 January 2017 | (England) Stefan Payne | Barnsley | Shrewsbury Town | Loan |
| 30 January 2017 | (Romania) Adrian Popa | (Romania) Steaua București | Reading | Undisclosed |
| 30 January 2017 | (England) Ben Purrington | Plymouth Argyle | Rotherham United | Undisclosed |
| 30 January 2017 | (England) Rekeil Pyke | Huddersfield Town | Colchester United | Loan |
| 30 January 2017 | (Republic of Ireland) Olamide Shodipo | Queens Park Rangers | Port Vale | Loan |
| 30 January 2017 | (England) Aaron Tshibola | Aston Villa | Nottingham Forest | Loan |
| 30 January 2017 | (England) Ben Wilson | (Wales) Cardiff City | Rochdale | Loan |
| 31 January 2017 | (Ghana) Jordan Ayew | Aston Villa | (Wales) Swansea City | Loan |
| 31 January 2017 | (The Gambia) Modou Barrow | (Wales) Swansea City | Leeds United | Loan |
| 31 January 2017 | (Australia) Tom Beadling | Sunderland | Bury | Loan |
| 31 January 2017 | (England) Jacob Bedeau | Bury | Aston Villa | Undisclosed |
| 31 January 2017 | (Algeria) Ismaël Bennacer | Arsenal | (France) Tours | Loan |
| 31 January 2017 | (Poland) Krystian Bielik | Arsenal | Birmingham City | Loan |
| 31 January 2017 | (England) Omar Bogle | Grimsby Town | Wigan Athletic | Undisclosed |
| 31 January 2017 | (England) Marc Bola | Arsenal | Notts County | Loan |
| 31 January 2017 | (Republic of Ireland) Robbie Brady | Norwich City | Burnley | Undisclosed |
| 31 January 2017 | (England) Reece Brown | Birmingham City | Chesterfield | Loan |
| 31 January 2017 | (Northern Ireland) Alex Bruce | Hull City | Wigan Athletic | Loan |
| 31 January 2017 | (England) Tahvon Campbell | West Bromwich Albion | Notts County | Loan |
| 31 January 2017 | (Spain) Sergi Canós | Norwich City | Brentford | Undisclosed |
| 31 January 2017 | (England) Josh Clackstone | Hull City | Notts County | Loan |
| 31 January 2017 | (England) Zach Clough | Bolton Wanderers | Nottingham Forest | £2.5m |
| 31 January 2017 | (England) Harry Cornick | Bournemouth | Gillingham | Loan |
| 31 January 2017 | (Wales) David Cotterill | Birmingham City | Bristol City | Loan |
| 31 January 2017 | (Ivory Coast) Cyriac | (Belgium) KV Oostende | Fulham | Loan |
| 31 January 2017 | (France) Sylvain Deslandes | Wolverhampton Wanderers | Bury | Loan |
| 31 January 2017 | (Netherlands) Mitchell Dijks | (Netherlands) Ajax | Norwich City | Loan |
| 31 January 2017 | (Republic of Ireland) Eoin Doyle | Preston North End | Portsmouth | Loan |
| 31 January 2017 | (England) Calum Dyson | Everton | Grimsby Town | Loan |
| 31 January 2017 | (Australia) Callum Elder | Leicester City | Barnsley | Loan |
| 31 January 2017 | (Netherlands) Marvin Emnes | (Wales) Swansea City | Blackburn Rovers | Loan |
| 31 January 2017 | (France) David Faupala | Manchester City | Chesterfield | Loan |
| 31 January 2017 | (England) Michael Folivi | Watford | Coventry City | Loan |
| 31 January 2017 | (Italy) Manolo Gabbiadini | (Italy) Napoli | Southampton | £14m |
| 31 January 2017 | (Scotland) Matt Gilks | (Scotland) Rangers | Wigan Athletic | Undisclosed |
| 31 January 2017 | (Spain) Jordi Gómez | Wigan Athletic | (Spain) Rayo Vallecano | Undisclosed |
| 31 January 2017 | (England) Lewis Grabban | Bournemouth | Reading | Loan |
| 31 January 2017 | (England) Jorge Grant | Nottingham Forest | Notts County | Loan |
| 31 January 2017 | (England) Jordan Green | Bournemouth | Leyton Orient | Loan |
| 31 January 2017 | (England) Liam Grimshaw | Preston North End | Chesterfield | Loan |
| 31 January 2017 | (Algeria) Adlène Guedioura | Watford | Middlesbrough | Undisclosed |
| 31 January 2017 | (England) Jacob Hanson | Huddersfield Town | Bradford City | Loan |
| 31 January 2017 | (France) Mouez Hassen | (France) Nice | Southampton | Loan |
| 31 January 2017 | (Wales) Ryan Hedges | (Wales) Swansea City | Barnsley | Undisclosed |
| 31 January 2017 | (England) Kaylen Hinds | Arsenal | Stevenage | Loan |
| 31 January 2017 | (England) Scott Hogan | Brentford | Aston Villa | £12m |
| 31 January 2017 | (Wales) Emyr Huws | (Wales) Cardiff City | Ipswich Town | Loan |
| 31 January 2017 | (Nigeria) Odion Ighalo | Watford | (China) Changchun Yatai | £20m |
| 31 January 2017 | (England) Rohan Ince | Brighton & Hove Albion | Swindon Town | Loan |
| 31 January 2017 | (Austria) Arnel Jakupovic | Middlesbrough | (Italy) Empoli | Undisclosed |
| 31 January 2017 | (Wales) Owain Jones | (Wales) Swansea City | Yeovil Town | Loan |
| 31 January 2017 | (England) Osman Kakay | Queens Park Rangers | Chesterfield | Loan |
| 31 January 2017 | (Scotland) Matty Kennedy | (Wales) Cardiff City | Plymouth Argyle | Loan |
| 31 January 2017 | (England) Michael Kightly | Burnley | Burton Albion | Loan |
| 31 January 2017 | (England) Mark Kitching | Middlesbrough | Rochdale | Undisclosed |
| 31 January 2017 | (Netherlands) Tim Krul | Newcastle United | (Netherlands) AZ | Loan |
| 31 January 2017 | (England) Josh Laurent | Hartlepool United | Wigan Athletic | Undisclosed |
| 31 January 2017 | (England) Adam Le Fondre | (Wales) Cardiff City | Bolton Wanderers | Loan |
| 31 January 2017 | (England) Matt Macey | Arsenal | Luton Town | Loan |
| 31 January 2017 | (France) Mikael Mandron | Eastleigh | Wigan Athletic | Undisclosed |
| 31 January 2017 | (England) Ben Marshall | Blackburn Rovers | Wolverhampton Wanderers | Undisclosed |
| 31 January 2017 | (England) Stephy Mavididi | Arsenal | Charlton Athletic | Loan |
| 31 January 2017 | (England) Conor McAleny | Everton | Oxford United | Loan |
| 31 January 2017 | (Northern Ireland) Billy Mckay | Wigan Athletic | (Scotland) Inverness Caledonian Thistle | Loan |
| 31 January 2017 | (Serbia) Luka Milivojević | (Greece) Olympiacos | Crystal Palace | Undisclosed |
| 31 January 2017 | (England) Stuart Moore | Reading | Luton Town | Loan |
| 31 January 2017 | (England) Carlton Morris | Norwich City | Rotherham United | Loan |
| 31 January 2017 | (England) Ravel Morrison | (Italy) Lazio | Queens Park Rangers | Loan |
| 31 January 2017 | (England) Glenn Murray | Bournemouth | Brighton & Hove Albion | Undisclosed |
| 31 January 2017 | (England) Jordon Mutch | Crystal Palace | Reading | Loan |
| 31 January 2017 | (Senegal) Alfred N'Diaye | (Spain) Villarreal | Hull City | Loan |
| 31 January 2017 | (England) Stuart O'Keefe | (Wales) Cardiff City | Milton Keynes Dons | Loan |
| 31 January 2017 | (France) Gabriel Obertan | Unattached | Wigan Athletic | Free |
| 31 January 2017 | (England) Reece Oxford | West Ham United | Reading | Loan |
| 31 January 2017 | (Spain) Alfonso Pedraza | (Spain) Villarreal | Leeds United | Loan |
| 31 January 2017 | (England) Matthew Penney | Sheffield Wednesday | Bradford City | Loan |
| 31 January 2017 | (Austria) Tin Plavotic | Bristol City | Cheltenham Town | Loan |
| 31 January 2017 | (France) Axel Prohouly | Queens Park Rangers | Port Vale | Loan |
| 31 January 2017 | (England) Joe Quigley | Bournemouth | Gillingham | Loan |
| 31 January 2017 | (England) Will Randall | Wolverhampton Wanderers | Walsall | Loan |
| 31 January 2017 | (Italy) Andrea Ranocchia | (Italy) Inter Milan | Hull City | Loan |
| 31 January 2017 | (England) Dominic Samuel | Reading | Ipswich Town | Loan |
| 31 January 2017 | (England) Aaron Simpson | Wolverhampton Wanderers | Portsmouth | Loan |
| 31 January 2017 | (England) Matt Smith | Fulham | Queens Park Rangers | Undisclosed |
| 31 January 2017 | (England) Viv Solomon-Otabor | Birmingham City | Bolton Wanderers | Loan |
| 31 January 2017 | (Senegal) Modou Sougou | Sheffield Wednesday | (Portugal) Moreirense | Loan |
| 31 January 2017 | (England) Matty Taylor | Bristol Rovers | Bristol City | Undisclosed |
| 31 January 2017 | (Wales) Neil Taylor | (Wales) Swansea City | Aston Villa | Undisclosed |
| 31 January 2017 | (Republic of Ireland) Kevin Toner | Aston Villa | Bradford City | Loan |
| 31 January 2017 | (Mali) Molla Wagué | (Italy) Udinese | Leicester City | Loan |
| 31 January 2017 | (England) George Waring | Stoke City | Carlisle United | Loan |
| 31 January 2017 | (England) James Weir | Hull City | Wigan Athletic | Loan |
| 31 January 2017 | (England) Ashley Westwood | Aston Villa | Burnley | Undisclosed |
| 31 January 2017 | (Netherlands) Yanic Wildschut | Wigan Athletic | Norwich City | £7m |
| 31 January 2017 | (Republic of Ireland) Marc Wilson | Bournemouth | West Bromwich Albion | Loan |
| 31 January 2017 | (Poland) Paweł Wszołek | (Italy) Verona | Queens Park Rangers | Undisclosed |
| 31 January 2017 | (England) Ryan Yates | Nottingham Forest | Shrewsbury Town | Loan |
| 1 February 2017 | (United States) Gboly Ariyibi | Chesterfield | Nottingham Forest | Undisclosed |
| 1 February 2017 | (Republic of Ireland) Jack Byrne | Manchester City | Wigan Athletic | Undisclosed |
| 1 February 2017 | (Poland) Kamil Grosicki | (France) Rennes | Hull City | Undisclosed |
| 1 February 2017 | (Serbia) Branislav Ivanović | Chelsea | (Russia) Zenit Saint Petersburg | Undisclosed |
| 1 February 2017 | (Scotland) Ross McCormack | Aston Villa | Nottingham Forest | Loan |
| 1 February 2017 | (Scotland) Jordan Rhodes | Middlesbrough | Sheffield Wednesday | Loan |
| 1 February 2017 | (France) Mamadou Sakho | Liverpool | Crystal Palace | Loan |

- ^{a} Player officially joined his club on 1 January 2017.
- ^{b} Player officially joined his club on 2 January 2017.
- ^{c} Player officially joined his club on 3 January 2017.
- ^{d} Deal was cancelled due to EFL rules.
- ^{e} Player officially joined his club new club at the end of the season.
