= Adam Page (disambiguation) =

Adam Page (born 1991) is an American professional wrestler.

Adam Page may also refer to:

- Adam Page (footballer) (born 1997), English footballer
- Adam Page (musician), Australian multi-instrumentalist and composer, member of Shaolin Afronauts
- Adam Page (sledge hockey) (born 1992), American ice sledge hockey player
