= 2016–17 Bristol City F.C. season =

Bristol City
2016–17 season
- Owner: Steve Lansdown
- Chairman: Keith Dawe
- Head Coach: Lee Johnson
- Stadium: Ashton Gate
- Championship: 17th
- FA Cup: Fourth round
- League Cup: Fourth round
- Top goalscorer: League: Tammy Abraham (23); All: Tammy Abraham (26)
- Highest home attendance: 25,404 vs. Birmingham City (7 May 2017)
- Lowest home attendance: 16,444 vs. Brentford (13 December 2016)
- Average home league attendance: 19,256
Home colours	Away colours

The 2016–17 season was Bristol City's 119th season as a professional football club and their second consecutive season back in the Championship. Along with competing in the Championship, the club also participated in the FA Cup and League Cup. The season covers the period from 1 July 2016 to 30 June 2017.

== First-Team Squad ==
No.	Name	Pos.	Nat.	Place of Birth	Age	Apps	Goals	Signed from	Date signed	Fee	End
Goalkeepers
1	Frank Fielding	GK	(England)	Blackburn	29	128	0	Derby County	26 June 2013	Undisclosed	2018
33	Fabian Giefer	GK	(Germany)	Adenau	27	11	0	Schalke 04	19 January 2017	Loan	2017
Defenders
2	Mark Little	RWB	(England)	Worcester	28	102	2	Peterborough United	25 June 2014	Free	2017
3	Joe Bryan	LB	(England)	Bristol	23	182	13	Academy	1 August 2011	Trainee	2019
4	Aden Flint	CB	(England)	Pinxton	27	200	29	Swindon Town	11 June 2013	£300,000	2020
13	Scott Golbourne	LB	(England)	Bristol	29	55	1	Wolverhampton Wanderers	28 January 2016	Undisclosed	2018
23	Hörður Björgvin Magnússon	CB/LB	(Iceland)	Reykjavík	24	29	1	Juventus	13 July 2016	£2,130,000	2019
26	Zak Vyner	RB	(England)	London	20	6	0	Academy	1 July 2015	Trainee	Undisclosed
27	Adam Matthews	RB	(Wales)	Swansea	25	23	0	Sunderland	28 July 2016	Loan	2017
42	Bailey Wright	CB	(Australia)	Melbourne	24	24	1	Preston North End	6 January 2017	Undisclosed	2019
Midfielders
6	Gary O'Neil	CM	(England)	Beckenham	34	30	1	Norwich City	1 July 2016	Free	2018
7	Korey Smith	CM	(England)	Hatfield, Herts	26	116	2	Oldham Athletic	27 June 2014	Undisclosed	2019
8	Josh Brownhill	CM	(England)	Warrington	21	32	1	Preston North End	1 July 2016	Undisclosed	Undisclosed
11	Callum O'Dowda	WG	(Republic of Ireland)	Kidlington	22	39	0	Oxford United	14 July 2016	£1,000,000	2019
14	Bobby Reid	CM	(England)	Bristol	24	106	8	Academy	29 April 2011	Trainee	2018
21	Marlon Pack	CM	(England)	Portsmouth	26	185	6	Cheltenham Town	2 August 2013	£100,000	2018
31	Jens Hegeler	CM	(Germany)	Cologne	29	15	0	Hertha BSC	4 January 2017	£255,000	2019
32	David Cotterill	RM	(Wales)	Cardiff	29	79	11	Birmingham City	31 January 2017	Loan	2017
Forwards
9	Tammy Abraham	CF	(England)	London	19	48	26	Chelsea	5 August 2016	Loan	2017
10	Lee Tomlin	SS/WG	(England)	Leicester	28	60	13	AFC Bournemouth	5 July 2016	£2,250,000	2019
12	Matty Taylor	CF	(England)	Oxford	27	15	2	Bristol Rovers	31 January 2017	£400,000	2019
18	Aaron Wilbraham	CF	(England)	Knutsford	37	126	34	Crystal Palace	2 July 2014	Free	2017
20	Jamie Paterson	CF/WG	(England)	Coventry	25	24	5	Nottingham Forest	27 August 2016	Undisclosed	2019
22	Milan Đurić	CF	(Bosnia and Herzegovina) (Socialist Federal Republic of Yugoslavia)	Tuzla	27	14	1	Cesena	4 January 2016	£1,500,000	2019
Out on Loan
16	Gustav Engvall	CF	(Sweden)	Kalmar	21	6	0	IFK Göteborg	31 August 2016	£1,360,000	2019
17	Taylor Moore	CB	(England)	Walthamstow	20	7	0	Lens	25 August 2016	£1,500,000	2019
19	Paul Garita	CF	(Cameroon)	Douala	22	1	0	Châteauroux	7 January 2016	£50,000	Undisclosed
24	Max O'Leary	GK	(England)	Bristol	20	2	0	Academy	8 August 2015	Trainee	2018
29	Ivan Lučić	GK	(Austria)	Vienna	22	3	0	Bayern Munich	27 July 2016	Undisclosed	2018
30	Diego De Girolamo	WG	(Italy) (England)	Chesterfield	21	1	0	Sheffield United	7 July 2016	Free	2018

=== Statistics ===
As of 7 May 2017

No.	Pos	Nat	Player	Total		Championship		FA Cup		League Cup	
No.	Pos	Nat	Player	Apps	Goals	Apps	Goals	Apps	Goals	Apps	Goals
1	GK	(England) ENG	Frank Fielding	30	0	27+0	0	2+0	0	1+0	0
2	DF	(England) ENG	Mark Little	34	0	26+2	0	2+0	0	2+2	0
3	DF	(England) ENG	Joe Bryan	49	1	39+5	1	3+0	0	1+1	0
4	DF	(England) ENG	Aden Flint	53	5	46+0	5	3+0	0	4+0	0
6	MF	(England) ENG	Gary O'Neil	30	1	22+7	1	1+0	0	0+0	0
7	MF	(England) ENG	Korey Smith	24	0	21+2	0	1+0	0	0+0	0
8	MF	(England) ENG	Josh Brownhill	32	1	19+8	1	2+1	0	2+0	0
9	FW	(England) ENG	Tammy Abraham	48	26	40+1	23	1+2	0	1+3	3
10	FW	(England) ENG	Lee Tomlin	42	7	30+8	6	1+0	0	1+2	1
11	MF	(Republic of Ireland) IRL	Callum O'Dowda	39	0	15+19	0	1+1	0	3+0	0
12	FW	(England) ENG	Matty Taylor	15	2	9+6	2	0+0	0	0+0	0
13	DF	(England) ENG	Scott Golbourne	24	0	17+2	0	1+0	0	4+0	0
14	MF	(England) ENG	Bobby Reid	35	4	18+12	3	1+0	0	3+1	1
16	FW	(Sweden) SWE	Gustav Engvall	6	0	0+2	0	1+1	0	2+0	0
18	FW	(England) ENG	Aaron Wilbraham	35	5	8+23	4	0+0	0	4+0	1
20	FW	(England) ENG	Jamie Paterson	24	5	16+6	4	1+1	1	0+0	0
21	MF	(England) ENG	Marlon Pack	39	2	29+4	2	0+2	0	4+0	0
22	FW	(Bosnia and Herzegovina) BIH	Milan Đurić	14	1	3+8	1	3+0	0	0+0	0
23	DF	(Iceland) ISL	Hörður Björgvin Magnússon	29	1	26+2	1	1+0	0	0+0	0
26	DF	(England) ENG	Zak Vyner	4	0	3+0	0	1+0	0	0+0	0
27	DF	(Wales) WAL	Adam Matthews	14	0	11+1	0	0+0	0	2+0	0
28	FW	(England) ENG	Shawn McCoulsky	1	0	0+0	0	0+0	0	0+1	0
31	MF	(Germany) GER	Jens Hegeler	15	0	8+4	0	3+0	0	0+0	0
32	MF	(Wales) WAL	David Cotterill	13	2	12+1	2	0+0	0	0+0	0
33	GK	(Germany) GER	Fabian Giefer	11	0	10+0	0	1+0	0	0+0	0
42	DF	(Australia) AUS	Bailey Wright	24	1	21+0	1	3+0	0	0+0	0
Player(s) out on loan:
17	DF	(England) ENG	Taylor Moore	7	0	1+4	0	0+0	0	2+0	0
19	FW	(Cameroon) CMR	Paul Garita	1	0	0+0	0	0+0	0	0+1	0
29	GK	(Austria) AUT	Ivan Lučić	3	0	1+1	0	0+0	0	1+0	0
30	FW	(Italy) ITA	Diego De Girolamo	1	0	0+0	0	0+0	0	0+1	0
Player(s) who left the club during the season:
5	DF	(Republic of Ireland) IRL	Derrick Williams	2	0	0+0	0	0+0	0	2+0	0
5	DF	(Sweden) SWE	Joel Ekstrand	2	0	1+1	0	0+0	0	0+0	0
12	GK	(England) ENG	Richard O'Donnell	11	0	8+0	0	0+1	0	2+0	0
15	MF	(England) ENG	Luke Freeman	20	2	13+4	2	0+0	0	3+0	0
20	DF	(England) ENG	Luke Ayling	1	0	1+0	0	0+0	0	0+0	0
22	FW	(Ivory Coast) CIV	Jonathan Kodjia	4	0	4+0	0	0+0	0	0+0	0

==== Goals ====
As of 7 May 2017

Rank	No.	Nat.	Po.	Name	Championship	FA Cup	League Cup	Total
1	9	(England)	CF	Tammy Abraham	23	0	3	26
2	10	(England)	SS	Lee Tomlin	6	0	1	7
3	4	(England)	CB	Aden Flint	5	0	0	5
3	18	(England)	CF	Aaron Wilbraham	4	0	1	5
3	20	(England)	RW	Jamie Paterson	4	1	0	5
6	14	(England)	CM	Bobby Reid	3	0	1	4
7	12	(England)	CF	Matty Taylor	2	0	0	2
7	~~15~~	(England)	AM	Luke Freeman	2	0	0	2
7	21	(England)	CM	Marlon Pack	2	0	0	2
7	32	(Wales)	RM	David Cotterill	2	0	0	2
12	3	(England)	LB	Joe Bryan	1	0	0	1
12	6	(England)	CM	Gary O'Neil	1	0	0	1
12	8	(England)	CM	Josh Brownhill	1	0	0	1
12	22	(Bosnia and Herzegovina)	CF	Milan Đurić	1	0	0	1
12	23	(Iceland)	CB	Hörður Björgvin Magnússon	1	0	0	1
12	42	(Australia)	CB	Bailey Wright	1	0	0	1
Own Goals					1	0	0	1
Total					59	1	6	66

==== Disciplinary record ====
As of 7 May 2017

Rank	No.	Nat.	Po.	Name	Championship			FA Cup			League Cup			Total		
Rank	No.	Nat.	Po.	Name	Yellow card	(yellow card) (yellow-red card)	Red card	Yellow card	(yellow card) (yellow-red card)	Red card	Yellow card	(yellow card) (yellow-red card)	Red card	Yellow card	(yellow card) (yellow-red card)	Red card
1	3	(England)	LB	Joe Bryan	10	0	0	1	0	0	1	0	0	11	0	0
2	10	(England)	SS	Lee Tomlin	10	0	0	0	0	0	0	0	0	10	0	0
3	21	(England)	CM	Marlon Pack	7	0	0	0	0	0	2	0	0	9	0	0
4	2	(England)	RB	Mark Little	6	0	0	0	0	0	0	0	0	6	0	0
4	6	(England)	CM	Gary O'Neil	5	1	0	0	0	0	0	0	0	5	1	0
6	4	(England)	CB	Aden Flint	4	0	0	0	0	0	1	0	0	5	0	0
6	7	(England)	CM	Korey Smith	5	0	0	0	0	0	0	0	0	5	0	0
8	18	(England)	CF	Aaron Wilbraham	4	0	0	0	0	0	0	0	0	4	0	0
8	31	(Germany)	DM	Jens Hegeler	3	0	0	1	0	0	0	0	0	4	0	0
10	9	(England)	CF	Tammy Abraham	3	0	0	0	0	0	0	0	0	3	0	0
10	14	(England)	CM	Bobby Reid	2	0	0	0	0	0	1	0	0	3	0	0
10	~~15~~	(England)	AM	Luke Freeman	3	0	0	0	0	0	0	0	0	3	0	0
10	20	(England)	RW	Jamie Paterson	2	0	0	1	0	0	0	0	0	3	0	0
10	32	(Wales)	RM	David Cotterill	3	0	0	0	0	0	0	0	0	3	0	0
10	42	(Australia)	CB	Bailey Wright	3	0	0	0	0	0	0	0	0	3	0	0
16	17	(England)	CB	Taylor Moore	0	0	0	0	0	0	2	0	0	2	0	0
17	1	(England)	GK	Frank Fielding	1	0	0	0	0	0	0	0	0	1	0	0
17	~~5~~	(Republic of Ireland)	CB	Derrick Williams	0	0	0	0	0	0	1	0	0	1	0	0
17	8	(England)	CM	Josh Brownhill	1	0	0	0	0	0	0	0	0	1	0	0
17	13	(England)	LB	Scott Golbourne	0	0	0	0	0	0	1	0	0	1	0	0
17	22	(Bosnia and Herzegovina)	CF	Milan Đurić	1	0	0	0	0	0	0	0	0	1	0	0
17	23	(Iceland)	CB	Hörður Björgvin Magnússon	1	0	0	0	0	0	0	0	0	1	0	0
17	27	(Wales)	RB	Adam Matthews	1	0	0	0	0	0	0	0	0	1	0	0
17	33	(Germany)	GK	Fabian Giefer	1	0	0	0	0	0	0	0	0	1	0	0
Total					76	1	0	3	0	0	9	0	0	88	1	0

=== Contracts ===
Date	Position	Nationality	Name	Length	Until	Ref.
7 July 2016	CM	(England)	Korey Smith	3 years	June 2019	
14 July 2016	RW	(Wales)	Wes Burns	2 years	June 2018	
5 September 2016	CM	(England)	Marlon Pack	2 years	June 2018	
2 December 2016	CB	(England)	Aden Flint	4 years	June 2020	
5 January 2017	CB	(England)	Kodi Lyons-Foster	6 months	June 2017	
5 January 2017	CF	(England)	James Difford	6 months	June 2017	
18 January 2017	WG	(Italy) (England)	Diego De Girolamo	1 1/2 years	June 2018	

== Transfers ==
=== In ===
Date	Position	Nationality	Name	From	Fee	Ref.
1 July 2016	CM	ENG	Josh Brownhill	Preston North End	Undisclosed	
1 July 2016	CM	ENG	Gary O'Neil	Norwich City	Free transfer	
5 July 2016	AM	ENG	Lee Tomlin	AFC Bournemouth	£3,000,000	
7 July 2016	CB	ENG	Jack Challis	Birmingham City	Free transfer (Note: Joined the Under-21 squad.)	
7 July 2016	WG	ITA ENG	Diego De Girolamo	Sheffield United	Free transfer	
7 July 2016	CB	ENG	Kodi Lyons-Foster	Aston Villa	Free transfer	
7 July 2016	CM	ENG	Shabazz Omofe	Chelsea	Free transfer	
9 July 2016	GK	BIH CAN	Denis Begovic	Hoffenheim	Free transfer	
13 July 2016	CB	ISL	Hörður Björgvin Magnússon	Juventus	£2,130,000	
14 July 2016	CF	IRL ENG	Callum O'Dowda	Oxford United	£1,000,000 (Note: Transfer fee to rise to a potential of £1.6 million.)	
27 July 2016	GK	AUT	Ivan Lučić	Bayern Munich	Undisclosed	
25 August 2016	CB	ENG	Taylor Moore	Lens	£1,500,000	
27 August 2016	WG	ENG	Jamie Paterson	Nottingham Forest	Undisclosed	
31 August 2016	CF	SWE	Gustav Engvall	IFK Göteborg	£1,360,000	
6 September 2016	CB	SWE	Joel Ekstrand	Watford	Free transfer	
4 January 2017	CF	BIH	Milan Đurić	Cesena	£1,500,000	
4 January 2017	CM	GER	Jens Hegeler	Hertha Berlin	£255,000	
6 January 2017	CB	AUS	Bailey Wright	Preston North End	Undisclosed	
31 January 2017	CF	ENG	Matty Taylor	Bristol Rovers	£400,000	
31 January 2017	CF	ENG	Freddie Hinds	Luton Town	Undisclosed	
31 January 2017	CB	CRO	Tin Plavotic	FC Schalke 04 II	Undisclosed	

Income ▲ – Undisclosed (£10,395,000+)

=== Out ===
Date	Position	Nationality	Name	To	Fee	Ref.
1 July 2016	CB	EGY ENG	Adam El-Abd	Shrewsbury Town	Released	(Note: Following El-Abd's release, he signed for Shrewsbury Town.)
1 July 2016	CB	ENG	Karleigh Osborne	Plymouth Argyle	Released	(Note: Following Osborne's release, he signed for Plymouth Argyle.)
1 July 2016	RM	ENG	Scott Wagstaff	Gillingham	Released	(Note: Following Wagstaff's release, he signed for Gillingham.)
28 July 2016	MF	WAL	Elijah Chilekwa	Worcester City	Free transfer	
11 August 2016	CF	ENG	Kieran Agard	Milton Keynes Dons	Undisclosed	
11 August 2016	RB	ENG	Luke Ayling	Leeds United	£750,000	
26 August 2016	CB	IRL GER	Derrick Williams	Blackburn Rovers	£250,000	
30 August 2016	CF	CIV FRA	Jonathan Kodjia	Aston Villa	£11,000,000	(Note: Transfer fee to rise to a potential of £15 million.)
19 January 2017	RW	WAL	Wes Burns	Fleetwood Town	Undisclosed	
19 January 2017	GK	ENG	Richard O'Donnell	Rotherham United	Undisclosed	
30 January 2017	AM	ENG	Luke Freeman	Queens Park Rangers	Undisclosed	
31 January 2017	CB	SWE	Joel Ekstrand	Rotherham United	Mutual consent	(Note: Following Ekstrand's departure, he signed for Rotherham United.)

Expenditure ▼ – Undisclosed (£12,000,000)

=== Loans in ===
Date	Position	Nationality	Name	From	Date until	Ref.
28 July 2016	RB	WAL	Adam Matthews	Sunderland	End of Season	
5 August 2016	CF	ENG	Tammy Abraham	Chelsea	End of Season	
19 January 2017	GK	GER	Fabian Giefer	Schalke 04	End of Season	
31 January 2017	RM	WAL	David Cotterill	Birmingham City	End of Season	

=== Loans out ===
Date	Position	Nationality	Name	To	Date until	Ref.
14 July 2016	RW	WAL	Wes Burns	Aberdeen	16 January 2017 (Note: On 16 January 2017, Wes Burns' loan at Aberdeen was terminated.)	
August 2016	GK	ENG	Max O'Leary	Bath City	End of Season (Note: O'Leary's loan was extended to the end of the season on 5 January.)	
4 August 2016	MF	ENG	George Dowling	Weston-super-Mare	30 September 2016	
4 August 2016	ST	ENG	Shawn McCoulsky	Weston-super-Mare	30 September 2016	
4 August 2016	CM	WAL	Joe Morrell	Sutton United	2 September 2016	
19 August 2016	LW	ENG	Jonny Smith	Cheltenham Town	2 January 2017	
31 August 2016	CF	CMR	Paul Garita	Plymouth Argyle	January 2017	
31 August 2016	RB	ENG	Zak Vyner	Accrington Stanley	January 2017	
12 October 2016	CB	ENG	Aden Baldwin	Weston-super-Mare	31 May 2017 (Note: Baldwin's loan was extended to May on 5 January.)	
17 November 2016	CF	ENG	Shawn McCoulsky	Torquay United	1 January 2017	
3 December 2016	CF	ENG	Jake Andrews	Guernsey	3 February 2017 (Note: Andrew's loan was extended to 3 February on 5 January.)	
3 December 2016	DF	ENG	Kodi Lyons-Foster	Guernsey	2 January 2016	
1 January 2017	SS	ITA	Diego De Girolamo	Cheltenham Town	End of Season	
5 January 2017	CF	WAL	Connor Lemonheigh-Evans	Bath City	3 February 2017	
5 January 2017	DF	ENG	Cameron Pring	Guernsey	3 February 2017	
6 January 2017	CB	ENG	Taylor Moore	Bury	End of Season	
30 January 2017	GK	AUT	Ivan Lučić	AaB	End of Season	
31 January 2017	CB	CRO	Tin Plavotic	Cheltenham Town	End of Season	

== Competitions ==
=== Pre-season friendlies ===
Win Draw Loss

10 July 2016	Hengrove Athletic	0–7	Bristol City	Hengrove
14:00		Report	Freeman 15'; Flint 25'; Brownhill 36'; Agard 41'; Tomlin 49', 53'; Smith 85'	Stadium: Norton Lane

16 July 2016	Yeovil Town	1–2	Bristol City	Yeovil
15:00	Eaves 57'	Report	Flint 24'; Kodjia 44'	Stadium: Huish Park

20 July 2016	Granada	2–0	Bristol City	La Manga, Spain
19:00 CEST	Gabriel Silva 22'; Machís 59'	Report		Stadium: Pinatar Arena

22 July 2016	UCAM Murcia	1–3	Bristol City	La Manga, Spain
11:00 CEST		Report	Freeman 11'; Garita 28'; Vyner 60'	Stadium: La Manga Stadium

25 July 2016	Cheltenham Town	1–2	Bristol City	Cheltenham
19:45	Wright 87'	Report	Kodjia 9'; Tomlin 63'	Stadium: Whaddon Road

26 July 2016	Bath City	0–1	Bristol City	Bath
19:45		Report	Reid 27'	Stadium: Twerton Park

30 July 2016	Bristol City	0–0	Portsmouth	Bristol
15:00		Report		Stadium: Ashton Gate Stadium; Attendance: 5,317 (721); Referee: Kevin Friend

=== EFL Championship ===
==== League table ====
Pos	Team	Pld	W	D	L	GF	GA	GD	Pts
15	Wolverhampton Wanderers	46	16	10	20	54	58	−4	58
16	Ipswich Town	46	13	16	17	48	58	−10	55
17	Bristol City	46	15	9	22	60	66	−6	54
18	Queens Park Rangers	46	15	8	23	52	66	−14	53
19	Birmingham City	46	13	14	19	45	64	−19	53

Source: English Football League, Soccerway
Rules for classification: 1) Points; 2) Goal difference; 3) Number of goals scored; 4) Points in head-to-head matches; 5) Goal difference in head-to-head matches; 6) Goals scored in head-to-head matches; 7) Play-off.

==== Results summary ====
Overall								Home						Away					
Pld	W	D	L	GF	GA	GD	Pts	W	D	L	GF	GA	GD	W	D	L	GF	GA	GD
46	15	9	22	60	66	−6	54	11	4	8	33	26	+7	4	5	14	27	40	−13

Last updated: 7 May 2017.
Source: Football League Championship

==== Results by matchday ====
Matchday	1	2	3	4	5	6	7	8	9	10	11	12	13	14	15	16	17	18	19	20	21	22	23	24	25	26	27	28	29	30	31	32	33	34	35	36	37	38	39	40	41	42	43	44	45	46
Ground	H	A	A	H	H	A	A	H	A	H	H	A	A	H	A	H	A	A	H	A	H	H	A	A	H	H	A	H	H	A	A	H	H	A	H	H	A	H	A	A	H	H	A	H	A	H
Result	W	W	L	L	W	D	L	D	W	W	W	L	L	W	D	L	L	L	W	L	L	L	L	L	L	L	L	D	W	D	L	L	D	L	D	D	W	W	L	L	W	W	D	W	W	L
Position	5	1	7	10	6	8	12	12	10	5	5	5	6	6	6	9	10	13	11	14	15	16	17	17	18	19	20	20	20	20	20	21	21	21	22	22	21	19	21	21	21	18	18	18	17	17

Updated to match(es) played on 7 May 2017. Source: Statto.com
A = Away; H = Home; W = Win; D = Draw; L = Loss

==== Matches ====
6 August 2016 1	Bristol City	2–1	Wigan Athletic	Ashton Gate, Bristol
15:00 BST	Magnusson 81'; Reid 90'; Tomlin (yellow card) 90+5'	Report	(yellow card) 27' Morgan; 32' Gilbey; (yellow card) 71' Burn; (yellow card) 72' Perkins; (yellow card) 79' Daniels	Stadium: Ashton Gate Stadium; Attendance: 17,635; Referee: James Adcock

13 August 2016 2	Burton Albion	1–2	Bristol City	Burton upon Trent, Staffordshire
15:00 BST	Flanagan (yellow card) 66'; Naylor 88'	Report	(yellow card) 35' Tomlin; 44', 90+5' Abraham	Stadium: Pirelli Stadium; Attendance: 4,579; Referee: David Coote

16 August 2016 3	Norwich City	1–0	Bristol City	Norwich, Suffolk
19:45 BST	Howson 38'; Pinto (yellow card) 50'; Tettey (yellow card) 90'	Report		Stadium: Carrow Road; Attendance: 26,297; Referee: Stuart Atwell

20 August 2016 4	Bristol City	0–1	Newcastle United	Ashton Gate, Bristol
15:00 BST	(yellow card) 33' Freeman; (yellow card) 45' Tomlin; (yellow card) 55' Little		Gayle 19'	Stadium: Ashton Gate Stadium; Attendance: 22,512; Referee: Tony Harrington

27 August 2016 5	Bristol City	3–1	Aston Villa	Bristol
15:00 BST	Bryan (yellow card) 31'; Abraham 59'; Bryan 61'; Tomlin 81'	BBC Report	5' (yellow card) 89'Grealish; (yellow card) 56' Ayew; (yellow card) 57' Chester; (yellow card) 69' de Laet; (yellow card) 74' Elphick; (yellow card) 76' Jedinak; (yellow card) 90+4' Bacuna	Stadium: Ashton Gate Stadium; Attendance: 21,099; Referee: James Lingington

10 September 2016 6	Rotherham United	2–2	Bristol City	Rotherham
15:00 BST	Brown 6'; Flint 58' (o.g.); Camp (yellow card) 74'; Ward (yellow card) 90+1'	Report	(yellow card) 36' Tomlin; 74' Abraham; 83' Reid	Stadium: Aesseal New York Stadium; Attendance: 8,559; Referee: Andy Madley

13 September 2016 7	Sheffield Wednesday	3–2	Bristol City	Sheffield
19:45 BST	Fletcher 52'; Hutchinson (red card) 59'; Bannan 75'; Lee 90+6' (yellow card) 90+6'	Report	Abraham 33', 39'; O'Neil (yellow card) 42' (yellow-red card) 61'; Flint (yellow card) 62'	Stadium: Hillsborough Stadium; Attendance: 24,151; Referee: Darren Bond

17 September 2016 8	Bristol City	1–1	Derby County	Ashton Gate, Bristol
15:00 BST	Wilbraham 90+4'	Report	Anya 44'; (yellow card) 65' Christie; (yellow card) 89' Carson	Stadium: Ashton Gate Stadium; Attendance: 19,451; Referee: Andy Woolmer

24 September 2016 9	Fulham	0–4	Bristol City	London
15:00 BST	Parker (yellow card) 38'; Sigurdsson (yellow card) 75'; McDonald (red card) 79'	Report	10' Abraham; (yellow card) 49' Little; 60' Freeman; 68' Reid; 83' Flint; (yellow card) 84' Paterson	Stadium: Craven Cottage; Attendance: 20,585; Referee: Peter Bankes

27 September 2016 10	Bristol City	1–0	Leeds United	Bristol
19:45 BST	Pack (yellow card) 34', (goal) 59'; Tomlin (yellow card) 45+1'	Report	(yellow card) 44' Jansson; (yellow card) 45+2' Dallas; (yellow card) 59' Hernández; (yellow card) 88' Taylor	Stadium: Ashton Gate Stadium; Attendance: 19,699; Referee: Keith Stroud

1 October 2016 11	Bristol City	2–1	Nottingham Forest	Bristol
15:00 BST	Reid (yellow card) 24'; O'Neil (yellow card) 58'; Abraham 65', (yellow card) 66'; Paterson 68'	BBC Report	(yellow card) 23' Fox; 33' Vellios; (yellow card) 60' Osborn	Stadium: Ashton Gate Stadium; Attendance: 18,922; Referee: Scott Duncan

14 October 2016 12	Cardiff City	2–1	Bristol City	Cardiff
19:45 BST	Whittingham 25' (pen.) (yellow card) 42'; Bennett (yellow card) 37'; Bamba 67'; Gunnarsson (yellow card) 70'; Immers (yellow card) 90+4'	Report	Tomlin 69'; Abraham (yellow card) 70'; Bryan (yellow card) 81'; Little (yellow card) 86'	Stadium: Cardiff City Stadium; Attendance: 22,776; Referee: James Linington

18 October 2016 13	Queens Park Rangers	1–0	Bristol City	Shepherd's Bush, London
19:45 BST	Idrissa Sylla 75'	Report	(yellow card) 61' Tomlin	Stadium: Loftus Road Stadium; Attendance: 12,552; Referee: Andrew Madley

22 October 2016 14	Bristol City	1–0	Blackburn Rovers	Bristol
15:00 BST	Flint (yellow card) 17'; Paterson (yellow card) 20'; Wilbraham 88'	Report	(yellow card) 89' Mulgrew	Stadium: Ashton Gate Stadium; Attendance: 21,452; Referee: Andrew Davies

29 October 2016 15	Barnsley	2–2	Bristol City	Barnsley
15:00 BST	Waktins 21'; Morsy (yellow card) 23'; Kay (yellow card) 42'; Jackson (yellow card) 58'; Hammill 90+1'	Report	(yellow card) 28' Wilbraham; (yellow card) 45+1' Smith; 58' (pen.) Tomlin; (yellow card) 69' Bryan; 76' Abraham	Stadium: Oakwell; Attendance: 11,869; Referee: Geoff Eltringham

5 November 2016 16	Bristol City	0–2	Brighton & Hove Albion	Bristol
17:30 GMT	O'Neil (yellow card) 54'	Report	Sidwell 13'; Murphy 20' (yellow card) 90+3'	Stadium: Ashton Gate Stadium; Attendance: 19,096; Referee: Darren Bond

19 November 2016 17	Birmingham City	1–0	Bristol City	Birmingham
15:00 GMT	Cotterill (yellow card) 59'; Morrison (yellow card) 77'; Adams 81'; Spector (red card) 90'	Report	(yellow card) 88' Pack	Stadium: St Andrew's; Attendance: 18,586; Referee: Tony Harrington

26 November 2016 18	Reading	2–1	Bristol City	Reading
15:00 GMT	McCleary (penalty missed) 13' 13'; Beerens 19' (yellow card) 61'; Moore (yellow card) 48'	Report	Bryan (yellow card) 83'; O'Neil 87'	Stadium: Madejski Stadium; Attendance: 18,778; Referee: Tim Robinson

3 December 2016 19	Bristol City	2–0	Ipswich Town	Bristol
15:00 GMT	Wilbraham (yellow card) 7'; Tomlin 31' (pen.) (yellow card) 38'; Freeman 72'	Report		Stadium: Ashton Gate Stadium; Attendance: 18,309; Referee: Stuart Attwell

10 December 2016 20	Huddersfield Town	2–1	Bristol City	Huddersfield
15:00 GMT	Kachunga 10' (yellow card) 85'; Schindler (yellow card) 32'; Wells 58'	Report	Freeman (yellow card) 31'; Abraham 33'; Fielding (yellow card) 49'	Stadium: The John Smith's Stadium; Attendance: 18,333; Referee: Keith Stroud

13 December 2016 21	Bristol City	0–1	Brentford	Bristol
19:45 GMT	Tomlin (yellow card) 73'; Smith (yellow card) 87'	Report	Colin 69'	Stadium: Ashton Gate Stadium; Attendance: 16,444; Referee: Andy Woolmer

17 December 2016 22	Bristol City	1–2	Preston North End	Bristol
15:00 GMT	Wilbraham 78'	Report	Makienok 21'; McGeady (yellow card) 45+4'; Johnson 85', (yellow card) 90+1'; Pearson (yellow card) 90'	Stadium: Ashton Gate Stadium; Attendance: 18,619; Referee: Simon Hooper

26 December 2016 23	Wolverhampton Wanderers	3–2	Bristol City	Wolverhampton
16:00 GMT	Edwards 3'; Coady (yellow card) 53'; Costa 57'; Cavaleiro 84' (pen.) (yellow card) 90+1'	Report	Matthews (yellow card) 31'; Pack (yellow card) 37'; Abraham 38'; Flint 44'; Freeman (yellow card) 67'	Stadium: Molineux Stadium; Attendance: 24,669; Referee: James Adcock

30 December 2016 24	Ipswich Town	2–1	Bristol City	Ipswich
19:45 GMT	Bru 39'; Pitman (yellow card) 43' (goal) 87'	Report	Abraham 52'; Magnússon (yellow card) 55'; Brownhill (yellow card) 58'	Stadium: Portman Road Stadium; Attendance: 15,640; Referee: David Coote

2 January 2017 25	Bristol City	2–3	Reading	Bristol
15:00 GMT	Abraham 27', 47' (pen.), (yellow card) 62'; Little (yellow card) 64'	Report	(yellow card) 39', (goal) 86', 90+3' Kermorgant; (yellow card) 68' van den Berg; 72' Kelly; (yellow card) 77' Moore	Stadium: Ashton Gate Stadium; Attendance: 20,074; Referee: Roger East

14 January 2017 26	Bristol City	2–3	Cardiff City	Bristol
12:00 GMT	Murphy 51' (o.g.); Abraham 78'; Little (yellow card) 90'	Report	Bamba (yellow card) 35'; Whittingham (yellow card) 62'; Pilkington 74' (pen.), 85'; Harris 82'	Stadium: Ashton Gate Stadium; Attendance: 19,452; Referee: Craig Pawson

21 January 2017 27	Nottingham Forest	1–0	Bristol City	Nottingham
15:00 GMT	Osborn 67' (yellow card) 90+4'; Ward (yellow card) 85'	Report	Little (yellow card) 35'; Hegeler (yellow card) 71'	Stadium: The City Ground; Attendance: 17,418; Referee: Darren Bond

31 January 2017 28	Bristol City	2–2	Sheffield Wednesday	Bristol
19:45 GMT	Tomlin 31' (pen.); Abraham 70'	Report	Forestieri 17'; Loovens (yellow card) 34'; Lees (yellow card) 37'; Bannan (yellow card) 45+3'; Wallace 51'; Reach (yellow card) 74'	Stadium: Ashton Gate Stadium; Attendance: 17,438; Referee: Oliver Langford

4 February 2017 29	Bristol City	1–0	Rotherham United	Bristol
15:00 GMT	Đurić 73'; Cotterill (yellow card) 79'	Report	(yellow card) 90+3' Vaulks	Stadium: Ashton Gate Stadium; Attendance: 18,737; Referee: Peter Bankes

11 February 2017 30	Derby County	3–3	Bristol City	Derby
15:00 GMT	Butterfield (yellow card) 41'; Bent 57', 81'; Keogh (yellow card) 63'; Ince 76'	Report	14' Taylor; 27', 38' Abraham; (yellow card) 58' Bryan; (yellow card) 66' Flint; (yellow card) 83' Đurić; (yellow card) 90+2' Hegeler	Stadium: Pride Park Stadium; Attendance: 28,043; Referee: Andy Davies

14 February 2017 31	Leeds United	2–1	Bristol City	Leeds
19:45 GMT	Wood 28'; Hernández 47'; Ronaldo (yellow card) 71'	Report	Tomlin (yellow card) 29'; Cotterill (yellow card) 44'; Wright (yellow card) 66'; Đurić 90+5'	Stadium: Elland Road; Attendance: 22,402; Referee: Jeremy Simpson

22 February 2017 32	Bristol City	0–2	Fulham	Bristol
19:45 GMT	Hegeler (yellow card) 61'	Report	Piazon 17'; Johansen (yellow card) 45'; Cairney 54'; Ream (yellow card) 71'	Stadium: Ashton Gate; Attendance: 17,272; Referee: Tim Robinson

25 February 2017 33	Newcastle United	2–2	Bristol City	Newcastle upon Tyne
15:00 GMT	Smith 59' (o.g.); Clark 82'	Report	11', (yellow card) 51' Wilbraham; 21' Cotterill	Stadium: St James' Park; Attendance: 52,131; Referee: Chris Kavanagh

28 February 2017 34	Aston Villa	2–0	Bristol City	Birmingham
19:45 GMT	Hutton (yellow card) 43'; Kodjia 54'; Hourihane 59'; Green (yellow card) 82'	Report	Smith (yellow card) 16'; Giefer (yellow card) 19'; Reid (yellow card) 39'; Wright (yellow card) 68'; Bryan (yellow card) 86'	Stadium: Villa Park; Attendance: 28,119; Referee: Simon Hooper

4 March 2017 35	Bristol City	0–0	Burton Albion	Bristol
15:00 GMT	O'Neil (yellow card) 12'	Report	Murphy (yellow card) 39'; Mousinho (yellow card) 66'; Brayford (yellow card) 67'; McFadzean (yellow card) 89'; Palmer (yellow card) 90+2'	Stadium: Ashton Gate Stadium; Attendance: 17,914; Referee: Graham Scott

7 March 2017 36	Bristol City	1–1	Norwich City	Bristol
19:45 GMT	Smith (yellow card) 69'; Wright 78'	Report	Wildschut 39'; Martin (yellow card) 77'; Dijks (yellow card) 79'	Stadium: Ashton Gate Stadium; Attendance: 17,035; Referee: Stephen Martin

11 March 2017 37	Wigan Athletic	0–1	Bristol City	Wigan
15:00 GMT	Gilbey (yellow card) 45+1'; Connolly (yellow card) 57'	Report	Pack (yellow card) 27'; Flint 88'	Stadium: DW Stadium; Attendance: 10,787; Referee: Andrew Madley

17 March 2017 38	Bristol City	4–0	Huddersfield Town	Bristol
19:45 GMT	Tomlin 30'; Abraham 45+13'; Flint 79'; Cotterill 83' (pen.)	Report	Billing (yellow card) 52'	Stadium: Ashton Gate Stadium; Attendance: 16,984; Referee: David Coote

1 April 2017 39	Brentford	2–0	Bristol City	London
15:00 BST	Canós 18'; Vibe 26'	Report	Bryan (yellow card) 12'; O'Neil (yellow card) 35'	Stadium: Griffin Park; Attendance: 11,360; Referee: Simon Hooper

4 April 2017 40	Preston North End	5–0	Bristol City	Preston
19:45 BST	Maxwell (yellow card) 4'; Barkhuizen 25'; McGeady 47' (pen.); Clarke 54'; Robinson 64', 68'; Huntington (yellow card) 90+1'	Report	Pack (yellow card) 34'; Tomlin (yellow card) 73'	Stadium: Deepdale; Attendance: 10,224; Referee: Andrew Madley

8 April 2017 41	Bristol City	3–1	Wolverhampton Wanderers	Bristol
15:00 BST	Paterson 33'; Abraham 39' (pen.), 49'; Flint (yellow card) 63'	Report	Edwards (yellow card) 31'; Böðvarsson 78'	Stadium: Ashton Gate Stadium; Attendance: 20,323; Referee: James Adcock

14 April 2017 42	Bristol City	2–1	Queens Park Rangers	Bristol
15:00 BST	Pack 14' (yellow card) 86'; Paterson 40'	Report	Manning (yellow card) 35'; Luongo (yellow card) 45+1'; Freeman (yellow card) 53'; Mackie (yellow card) 90+2'; Sylla 90+5'	Stadium: Ashton Gate Stadium; Attendance: 20,404; Referee: Jeremy Simpson

17 April 2017 43	Blackburn Rovers	1–1	Bristol City	Blackburn
15:00 BST	Bennett (yellow card) 22'; Williams (yellow card) 54'; Gallagher 71'	Report	Abraham 14'; Wright (yellow card) 49'; Bryan (yellow card) 81'; Cotterill (yellow card) 86'	Stadium: Ewood Park; Attendance: 13,935; Referee: Mike Jones

22 April 2017 44	Bristol City	3–2	Barnsley	Bristol
15:00 BST	Smith (yellow card) 42'; Abraham 53'; Paterson 69'; Flint 74'	Report	(yellow card) 34' Scowen; 37' Mowatt; 64' Moncur	Stadium: Ashton Gate Stadium; Attendance: 18,617; Referee: Scott Duncan

29 April 2017 45	Brighton & Hove Albion	0–1	Bristol City	Brighton
17:30 BST	Skalák (yellow card) 45'	Report	Brownhill 43'; Pack (yellow card) 47'; Bryan (yellow card) 65'	Stadium: Falmer Stadium; Attendance: 30,338; Referee: Oliver Langford

7 May 2017 46	Bristol City	0–1	Birmingham City	Bristol
12:00 BST	Bryan (yellow card) 64'	Report	Adams 16' (yellow card) 56'; Gardner (yellow card) 35'; Maghoma (yellow card) 54'; Grounds (yellow card) 55'; Kuszczak (yellow card) 90+3'; Nsue (yellow card) 90+5'	Stadium: Ashton Gate Stadium; Attendance: 25,404; Referee: Lee Mason

=== FA Cup ===
7 January 2017 Third round	Bristol City	0–0	Fleetwood Town	Bristol
15:00 GMT		Report		Stadium: Ashton Gate Stadium; Attendance: 10,301; Referee: Steve Martin

17 January 2017 Third round replay	Fleetwood Town	0–1	Bristol City	Fleetwood
19:45 GMT	Hunter (yellow card) 90+4'	Report	Paterson 17' (yellow card) 33'; Hegeler (yellow card) 77'; Bryan (yellow card) 87'	Stadium: Higbury Stadium; Attendance: 2,115; Referee: Carl Boyeson

28 January 2017 Fourth round	Burnley	2–0	Bristol City	Burnley
15:00 GMT	Vokes 45'; Tarkowski (yellow card) 67'; Defour 68'; Darikwa (yellow card) 90+2'	Report		Stadium: Turf Moor; Attendance: 14,921; Referee: Andre Marriner

=== League Cup ===
9 August 2016 First round	Wycombe Wanderers	0–1	Bristol City	High Wycombe, Buckinghamshire
19:45 BST	McGinn (yellow card) 34'; Wood (yellow card) 47'	Report	27' Abraham; (yellow card) 31' Williams	Stadium: Adams Park; Attendance: 1,842; Referee: Lee Collins

23 August 2016 Second round	Scunthorpe United	1–2 (a.e.t.)	Bristol City	Scunthorpe, North Lincolnshire
19:45 BST	Morris 60' (pen.); Dawson (yellow card) 72' van Veen (yellow card) 96'	Report	35' Reid; (yellow card) 65' Golbourne; 97' Abraham	Stadium: Glanford Park; Attendance: 2,397; Referee: Ross Joyce

21 September 2016 Third round	Fulham	1–2	Bristol City	Fulham, London
19:45 BST	Lucas Piazon 14'; Joronen (yellow card) 54'	BBC Report	(yellow card) 28' Pack; 45' Wilbraham; (yellow card) 51' Moore; 90' Abraham	Stadium: Craven Cottage; Attendance: 6,017; Referee: Andy Davies

25 October 2016 Fourth round	Bristol City	1–2	Hull City	Ashton Gate, Bristol
19:45 BST	Bryan (yellow card) 40'; Reid (yellow card) 48'; Flint (yellow card) 65'; Moore (yellow card) 67'; Tomlin 90+3'	Report	Maguire 44'; Davies (yellow card) 45+3'; Dawson 47'	Stadium: Ashton Gate Stadium; Attendance: 16,149; Referee: Keith Stroud

== Summary ==
Games played	53 (46 Championship, 3 FA Cup, 4 League Cup)
Games won	19 (15 Championship, 1 FA Cup, 3 League Cup)
Games drawn	10 (9 Championship, 1 FA Cup, 0 League Cup)
Games lost	24 (22 Championship, 1 FA Cup, 1 League Cup)
Goals scored	67 (60 Championship, 1 FA Cup, 6 League Cup)
Goals conceded	72 (66 Championship, 2 FA Cup, 4 League Cup)
Goal difference	−5
Clean sheets	12 (9 Championship, 2 FA Cup, 1 League Cup)
Yellow cards	89 (77 Championship, 3 FA Cup, 9 League Cup)
Red cards	4 (1 Championship, 2 FA Cup, 1 League Cup)
Worst Discipline	Joe Bryan (11 (yellow card) , 0 (yellow card) (yellow-red card) , 0 (red card) )
Best result	4–0 vs Fulham (24 Sep 16); 4–0 vs Huddersfield Town (17 Mar 17)
Worst result	0–5 vs Preston North End (4 Apr 17)
Most appearances	Aden Flint (53 starts)
Top scorer	Tammy Abraham (26)
Points	54

=== Score overview ===
Opposition	Home score	Away score	Double
Aston Villa	3–1	0–2	No
Barnsley	3–2	2–2	No
Birmingham City	0–1	0–1	No
Blackburn Rovers	1–0	1–1	No
Brentford	0–1	2–0	No
Brighton & Hove Albion	0–2	1–0	No
Burton Albion	0–0	2–1	No
Cardiff City	1–2	2–3	No
Derby County	1–1	3–3	No
Fulham	0–2	4–0	No
Huddersfield Town	4–0	1–2	No
Ipswich Town	2–0	1–2	No
Leeds United	1–0	1–2	No
Newcastle United	0–1	2–2	No
Norwich City	1–1	0–1	No
Nottingham Forest	2–1	0–1	No
Preston North End	1–2	0–5	No
Queens Park Rangers	2–1	0–1	No
Reading	2–3	1–2	No
Rotherham United	1–0	2–2	No
Sheffield Wednesday	2–2	2–3	No
Wigan	2–1	1–0	Yes
Wolverhampton Wanderers	3–1	2–3	No
