= Josh Thomas (footballer, born 1999) =

English footballer

Personal information
- Date of birth: 17 April 1999 (age 27)
- Place of birth: Antrim, Northern Ireland
- Position: Midfielder

Team information
- Current team: Gloucester City
- Number: 8

Youth career
- –2013: Hereford United
- 2013–2016: Cheltenham Town

Senior career*
Years	Team	Apps	(Gls)
2016–2018	Cheltenham Town	0	(0)
2017	→ North Leigh (loan)	8	(0)
2017–2018	→ North Leigh (loan)	8	(0)
2018–	Gloucester City	44	(1)
- * Club domestic league appearances and goals as of 7 August 2020 (UTC)

Josh Thomas (born 17 April 1999) is an English professional footballer who plays as a midfielder for Gloucester City.

== Club career ==
Thomas joined Cheltenham Town in 2013 from Hereford United and signed his first professional deal in May 2017. Prior to this, Thomas enjoyed a short-term loan spell at North Leigh towards the end of the 2016–17 campaign. Thomas went onto make his first-team debut for the Robins during their EFL Trophy tie against Swansea City U23s, which resulted in a 2–1 defeat for Cheltenham, with Thomas featuring for the entire 90 minutes.

On 1 September 2017, Thomas returned to North Leigh on loan until January 2018.

== Career statistics ==
As of match played 4 November 2017.

Club	Season	League			FA Cup		EFL Cup		Other		Total	
Club	Season	Division	Apps	Goals	Apps	Goals	Apps	Goals	Apps	Goals	Apps	Goals
Cheltenham Town	2016–17	League Two	0	0	0	0	0	0	0	0	0	0
Cheltenham Town	2017–18	League Two	0	0	0	0	0	0	1 (Note: Appearance(s) in EFL Trophy)	0	1	0
Cheltenham Town	Total		0	0	0	0	0	0	1	0	1	0
North Leigh (loan)	2016–17	Southern League Division One South & West	8	0	0	0	—		0	0	8	0
North Leigh (loan)	2017–18	Southern League Division One South & West	8	0	2	0	—		1 (Note: Appearance(s) in FA Trophy)	0	11	0
North Leigh (loan)	Total		16	0	2	0	—		1	0	19	0
Career total			16	0	2	0	0	0	2	0	20	0
