= 2017–18 Cheltenham Town F.C. season =

Cheltenham Town
2017–18 season
- Chairman: Paul Baker
- Manager: Gary Johnson
- Stadium: Whaddon Road
- League Two: 17th
- FA Cup: First round (vs. Maidstone United)
- EFL Cup: Second round (vs. West Ham United)
- EFL Trophy: Group stage

The 2017–18 season was Cheltenham Town's 131st season in existence and their second consecutive season in League Two. Along with competing in League Two, the club also participated in the FA Cup, EFL Cup and EFL Trophy.

The season covered the period from 1 July 2017 to 30 June 2018.

== Competitions ==
=== Friendlies ===
Pre-season match details
Date	Opponents	Venue	Result	Score F–A	Scorers	Attendance	Ref
11 July 2017	Oxford City	A	L	1–2	Eisa		
14 July 2017	Bishop's Cleeve	A	W	6–0	Eisa (3), Winchester, Pell, Fondop-Talom	526	
17 July 2017	Evesham United	A	W	3–0	Wright, Eisa	550	
20 July 2017	Bath City	A	L	1–2	Winchester	165	
22 July 2017	Weston-super-Mare	A	L	1–2	Winchester		
25 July 2017	Bristol City	H	L	0–3		1,883	
29 July 2017	Peterborough United	H	L	1–5	Holman (pen)	1,017	

=== League Two ===
League Two match details
Date	League position	Opponents	Venue	Result	Score F–A	Scorers	Attendance	Ref
5 August 2017	18th	Morecambe	A	L	1–2	Eisa	1,450	
12 August 2017	13th	Crawley Town	H	W	1–0	Eisa	2,834	
19 August 2017	20th	Carlisle United	A	L	0–3		4,497	
26 August 2017	23rd	Exeter City	H	L	3–4	Dawson (2), Holman	3,168	
2 September 2017	24th	Stevenage	H	L	0–1		2,694	
9 September 2017	21st	Yeovil Town	A	D	0–0		2,732	
12 September 2017	22nd	Newport County	A	L	0–1		2,916	
16 September 2017	21st	Colchester United	H	W	3–1	Dawson, Eisa, Grimes	2,718	
23 September 2017	21st	Accrington Stanley	A	D	1–1	Eisa	1,321	
26 September 2017	16th	Mansfield Town	H	W	3–0	Graham, Morrell, Wright	2,480	
30 September 2017	13th	Chesterfield	A	W	2–0	Eisa (2)	5,305	
7 October 2017	12th	Swindon Town	H	W	2–1	Graham, Wright	5,050	
14 October 2017	13th	Port Vale	A	L	1–3	Dawson	4,277	
17 October 2017	16th	Grimsby Town	H	L	2–3	Pell, Winchester	2,468	
21 October 2017	12th	Lincoln City	H	W	1–0	Wright	3,312	
28 October 2017	15th	Wycombe Wanderers	A	D	3–3	Graham (2), Winchester	4,165	
11 November 2017	16th	Luton Town	H	D	2–2	Grimes, Boyle	3,900	
18 November 2017	16th	Notts County	A	L	1–3	Winchester	5,809	
21 November 2017	16th	Cambridge United	H	D	0–0		2,266	
25 November 2017	16th	Forest Green Rovers	A	D	1–1	Eisa	3,641	
9 December 2017	15th	Crewe Alexandra	H	W	1–0	Grimes	2,795	
16 December 2017	15th	Coventry City	A	L	1–2	Eisa	6,457	
23 December 2017	14th	Barnet	A	W	2–0	Dawson, Winchester	1,487	
26 December 2017	15th	Yeovil Town	H	L	0–2		3,484	
30 December 2017	15th	Newport County	A	D	1–1	Eisa	3,637	
1 January 2018	17th	Stevenage	A	L	1–4	Eisa	1,989	
6 January 2018	14th	Colchester United	A	W	4–1	Odelusi, Atangana, Sellars, Eisa	1,487	
13 January 2018	16th	Accrington Stanley	H	L	0–2		2,893	
20 January 2018	17th	Mansfield Town	A	L	2–3	Pell (pen), Adebayo	3,483	
27 January 2018	16th	Barnet	H	D	1–1	Eisa	2,609	
3 February 2018	16th	Grimsby Town	A	D	1–1	Boyle	3,352	
10 February 2018	14th	Port Vale	H	W	5–1	Eisa (3), Adebayo, Boyle	2,731	
13 February 2018	15th	Lincoln City	A	L	0–1		7,891	
17 February 2018	16th	Wycombe Wanderers	H	L	0–2		3,513	
24 February 2018	16th	Luton Town	A	D	2–2	Morrell, Eisa	8,453	
6 March 2018	16th	Notts County	H	D	1–1	Morrell	2,273	
10 March 2018	15th	Swindon Town	A	W	3–0	Andrews, Eisa (2)	6,658	
17 March 2018	15th	Chesterfield	H	D	1–1	Graham	2,822	
24 March 2018	15th	Crawley Town	A	W	5–3	Pell (2), Eisa (2), Boyle	2,172	
30 March 2018	15th	Carlisle United	H	L	0–1		3,107	
2 April 2018	15th	Exeter City	A	L	1–2	Winchester	4,420	
7 April 2018	15th	Morecambe	H	W	3–0	Sellars, Boyle, Pell	2,420	
14 April 2018	16th	Forest Green Rovers	H	L	0–1		4,744	
21 April 2018	16th	Cambridge United	A	L	3–4	Lloyd, Eisa (2)	3,853	
28 April 2018	17th	Coventry City	H	L	1–6	Eisa	5,027	
5 May 2018	17th	Crewe Alexandra	A	L	1–2	Lloyd	4,350	

==== League table ====
Pos	Team	Pld	W	D	L	GF	GA	GD	Pts
15	Crewe Alexandra	46	17	5	24	62	75	−13	56
16	Stevenage	46	14	13	19	60	65	−5	55
17	Cheltenham Town	46	13	12	21	67	73	−6	51
18	Grimsby Town	46	13	12	21	42	66	−24	51
19	Yeovil Town	46	12	12	22	59	75	−16	48

Source: BBC Sport
Rules for classification: 1) Points; 2) Goal difference; 3) Number of goals scored

=== FA Cup ===
EFL Cup match details
Round	Date	Opponents	Venue	Result	Score F–A	Scorers	Attendance	Ref
First round	4 November 2017	Maidstone United	H	L	2–4	Dawson, Finney (og)	2,799	

=== EFL Cup ===
EFL Cup match details
Round	Date	Opponents	Venue	Result	Score F–A	Scorers	Attendance	Ref
First round	8 August 2017	Oxford United	A	W	4–3^{[A]}	Eisa (2), Wright (2)	3,179	
Second round	23 August 2017	West Ham United	H	L	0–2		6,259	

=== EFL Trophy ===
EFL Trophy match details
Round	Date	Opponents	Venue	Result	Score F–A	Scorers	Attendance	Ref
Southern Group E	15 August 2017	Swansea City U23s	H	L	1–2	Storer	801	
Southern Group E	3 October 2017	Forest Green Rovers	H	L	1–2	Hinds	1,576	
Southern Group E	7 November 2017	Newport County	A	W	2–1	Graham, Pell	540	

==== Group table ====
Pos	Lge	Team	Pld	W	PW	PL	L	GF	GA	GD	Pts	Qualification
1	ACA	Swansea City U21 (Q)	3	3	0	0	0	6	2	+4	9	Round 2
2	L2	Forest Green Rovers (Q)	3	2	0	0	1	4	3	+1	6	Round 2
3	L2	Cheltenham Town (E)	3	1	0	0	2	4	5	−1	3	
4	L2	Newport County (E)	3	0	0	0	3	2	6	−4	0	

Updated to match(es) played on 7 November 2017. Source: EFL.com
(E) Eliminated; (Q) Qualified to the phase indicated

== Transfers ==
=== In ===
Date	Name	From	Fee	Ref
1 July 2017	Nigel Atangana	Leyton Orient	Free (released)	
1 July 2017	Kevin Dawson	Yeovil Town	Free	
1 July 2017	Jordon Forster	Hibernian	Undisclosed	
1 July 2017	Jamie Grimes	Dover Athletic	Free	
7 July 2017	Mohamed Eisa	Greenwich Borough	Free (released)	
7 July 2017	Jerell Sellars	Aston Villa	Free (released)	
10 August 2017	Brian Graham	Hibernian	Free	
31 August 2017	Scott Flinders	Macclesfield Town	Free (released)	
1 September 2017	Jaanai Gordon	West Ham United	Free (released)	
21 September 2017	Alex Davey	Chelsea	Free (released)	
5 January 2018	Sanmi Odelusi	Colchester United	Free (released)	

=== Out ===
Date	Name	To	Fee	Ref
8 June 2017	Billy Waters	Northampton Town	Undisclosed	
30 June 2017	Jack Barthram	Barrow	Released	
30 June 2017	Liam Davis	Torquay United	Released	
30 June 2017	James Dayton	Leyton Orient	Released	
30 June 2017	Asa Hall	Barrow	Released	
30 June 2017	James Jennings	Wrexham	Released	
30 June 2017	Calum Kitscha	Welling United	Released	
30 June 2017	Jordan Lymn	Evesham United	Released	
30 June 2017	Amari Morgan-Smith	York City	Released	
30 June 2017	Jack Munns	Hartlepool United	Released	
30 June 2017	Daniel Parslow	York City	Released	
30 June 2017	James Rowe	Aldershot Town	Released	
2 January 2018	Daniel O'Shaughnessy	HJK	Released	
4 January 2018	Alex Davey	Boreham Wood	Released	
9 January 2018	Kyle Storer	Solihull Moors	Released	

=== Loan in ===
Date	Name	From	End date	Ref
1 July 2017	Jonathan Flatt	Wolverhampton Wanderers	1 January 2018	
30 August 2017	Freddie Hinds	Bristol City	1 January 2018	
30 August 2017	Taylor Moore	Bristol City	30 June 2018	
30 August 2017	Joe Morrell	Bristol City	30 June 2018	
1 January 2018	Manny Onariase	Rotherham United	30 June 2018	
9 January 2018	Elijah Adebayo	Fulham	30 June 2018	
19 January 2018	Ilias Chatzitheodoridis	Brentford	30 June 2018	
30 January 2018	Joe Rodon	Swansea City	30 June 2018	
31 January 2018	Jake Andrews	Bristol City	30 June 2018	

=== Loan out ===
Date	Name	To	End date	Ref
18 August 2017	Adam Page	Gloucester City	15 September 2017	
1 September 2017	Josh Thomas	North Leigh	1 January 2018	
15 September 2017	Adam Page	Hereford	16 December 2017	
22 September 2017	Dan Holman	Boreham Wood	26 December 2017	
21 November 2017	Alex Davey	Torquay United	1 January 2018	
1 January 2018	Adam Page	Redditch United	1 February 2018	
3 January 2018	Dan Holman	Leyton Orient	30 June 2018	

== Squad statistics ==
Numbers in parentheses denote appearances as substitute.
Players with squad numbers struck through and marked † left the club during the playing season.
Players with names in italics and marked * were on loan from another club for the whole of their season with Cheltenham.
Players listed with no appearances have been in the matchday squad but only as unused substitutes.
Key to positions: GK – Goalkeeper; DF – Defender; MF – Midfielder; FW – Forward

No.	Pos.	Nat.	Name	Apps	Goals	Apps	Goals	Apps	Goals	Apps	Goals	Apps	Goals	Yellow card	Red card
No.	Pos.	Nat.	Name	League		FA Cup		EFL Cup		EFL Trophy		Total		Discipline	
~~1~~ †	GK	ENG	Jonathan Flatt *	4	0	0	0	2	0	1	0	7	0	0	0
2	DF	ENG	Jamie Grimes	41 (2)	3	1	0	2	0	2 (1)	0	46 (3)	3	3	1
3	DF	WAL	Jordan Cranston	17 (5)	0	1	0	2	0	1 (1)	0	21 (6)	0	4	0
~~4~~ †	MF	ENG	Kyle Storer	17 (4)	0	1	0	2	0	1 (2)	1	21 (6)	1	4	0
6	MF	FRA	Nigel Atangana	23 (9)	1	0	0	2	0	1	0	26 (9)	1	4	0
7	MF	ENG	Harry Pell	32 (5)	5	1	0	1 (1)	0	2	1	36 (6)	6	12	0
8	MF	IRL	Kevin Dawson	32 (2)	5	1	1	0 (1)	0	1	0	34 (3)	6	5	1
9	FW	ENG	Daniel Wright	16 (17)	3	0 (1)	0	1 (1)	2	1	0	18 (19)	5	1	2
10	FW	ENG	Dan Holman	0 (2)	1	0	0	1 (1)	0	1	0	2 (3)	1	0	0
11	MF	NIR	Carl Winchester	44	5	1	0	2	0	2 (1)	0	49 (1)	5	3	0
~~14~~ †	DF	FIN	Daniel O'Shaughnessy	5 (5)	0	0	0	0 (1)	0	2	0	7 (6)	0	2	0
14	FW	ENG	Elijah Adebayo *	2 (5)	2	0	0	0	0	0	0	2 (5)	2	0	0
15	DF	ENG	Will Boyle	33 (1)	5	0 (1)	0	2	0	2 (1)	0	37 (3)	5	8	0
16	MF	ENG	Adam Page	0	0	0	0	0 (1)	0	1	0	1 (1)	0	0	0
17	FW	ENG	Jerell Sellars	21 (10)	2	0 (1)	0	1	0	2	0	24 (11)	2	5	0
18	DF	ENG	Matt Bower	0 (3)	0	0	0	0	0	2	0	2 (3)	0	1	0
19	MF	ENG	Josh Thomas	0	0	0	0	0	0	1	0	1	0	0	0
20	FW	SDN	Mohamed Eisa	45	23	1	0	2	2	0 (2)	0	48 (2)	25	2	0
21	FW	SCO	Brian Graham	15 (12)	5	1	0	0 (1)	0	2	1	18 (13)	6	7	0
22	GK	ENG	Rhys Lovett	1	0	0	0	0	0	1	0	2	0	0	0
23	DF	SCO	Jordon Forster	4	0	0	0	2	0	0	0	6	0	0	0
24	GK	ENG	Scott Flinders	41	0	1	0	0	0	1	0	43	0	2	0
25	MF	WAL	Joe Morrell *	38	3	1	0	0	0	0	0	39	3	3	0
26	FW	ENG	Jaanai Gordon	0 (4)	0	0	0	0	0	0	0	0 (4)	0	0	0
~~27~~ †	FW	ENG	Freddie Hinds	1 (11)	0	0	0	0	0	2	1	3 (11)	1	2	0
27	DF	WAL	Joe Rodon *	7 (5)	0	0	0	0	0	0	0	7 (5)	0	0	0
28	DF	ENG	Taylor Moore *	35 (1)	0	1	0	0	0	2	0	38 (1)	0	4	1
~~29~~ †	DF	SCO	Alex Davey	0	0	0	0	0	0	1	0	1	0	1	0
29	FW	ENG	Sanmi Odelusi	3 (6)	1	0	0	0	0	0	0	3 (6)	1	0	0
30	DF	ENG	Manny Onariase *	4 (1)	0	0	0	0	0	0	0	4 (1)	0	0	0
32	MF	ENG	Will Dawes	0	0	0	0	0	0	0	0	0	0	0	0
33	DF	GRE	Ilias Chatzitheodoridis *	18	0	0	0	0	0	0	0	18	0	2	0
34	GK	ENG	Ross Grimshaw	0	0	0	0	0	0	0	0	0	0	0	0
35	MF	ENG	Jake Andrews *	4 (3)	1	0	0	0	0	0	0	4 (3)	1	0	0
46	MF	ENG	Lee Llewelyn	0	0	0	0	0	0	0	0	0	0	0	0
50	MF	ENG	George Lloyd	3 (4)	2	0	0	0	0	1	0	4 (4)	2	0	0

Players not included in matchday squads
No.	Pos.	Nat.	Name
5	DF	AUS	Aaron Downes
31	GK	ENG	Lewis Clayton

== Footnotes ==
A. After extra time.
