= Jerell Sellars =

English footballer

Personal information
- Full name: Jerell Anthony Sellars
- Date of birth: 28 April 1995 (age 31)
- Place of birth: Lincoln, England
- Height: 5 ft 8 in (1.73 m)
- Position: Forward

Youth career
- 2009–2012: Lincoln City
- 2016/2017: Aston Villa

Senior career*
Years	Team	Apps	(Gls)
2015–2017	Aston Villa	0	(0)
2016	→ Wycombe Wanderers (loan)	8	(0)
2017–2018	Cheltenham Town	35	(2)
2018–2021	Östersund	44	(5)
2022–2023	Redditch United	4	(0)
- * Club domestic league appearances and goals

Jerell Anthony Sellars (born 11 December 1995) is an English footballer who plays as a forward.

Sellars is a graduate of the Aston Villa Academy and played on loan at English Football League clubs Wycombe Wanderers and Cheltenham Town before moving to Östersund in Sweden.

== Career ==
=== Aston Villa ===
Sellars joined Aston Villa in 2012 from Lincoln City. He never made a senior appearance and was released in 2017. On 24 March 2016, Sellars followed teammate Benjamin Siegrist by joining League Two side Wycombe Wanderers on loan until the end of the 2015–16 season.

=== Cheltenham Town ===
On 7 July 2017, Sellers joined League Two side Cheltenham Town. On 21 June 2018, it was announced that Sellars would leave Cheltenham at the end of the month upon the expiry of his contract.

=== Östersunds FK ===
On 23 July 2018, Sellars joined the Swedish club Östersund in the top Swedish league Allsvenskan. He scored his first goal in Swedish football on 11 November 2018, in a 3–3 home draw against Hammarby.

=== Redditch United ===
On 4 November 2022, Sellars joined Redditch United.

== Personal life ==
Jerell's step father is former footballer and coach Terry Fleming.

His brother, Tyrell Sellars-Fleming, is in the Scunthorpe United academy.

== Career statistics ==
As of match played 26 September 2021

Appearances and goals by club, season and competition
Club	Season	League			National cup		League cup		Other		Total	
Club	Season	Division	Apps	Goals	Apps	Goals	Apps	Goals	Apps	Goals	Apps	Goals
Aston Villa	2015–16	Premier League	0	0	0	0	0	0	0	0	0	0
Aston Villa	2016–17	Championship	0	0	0	0	0	0	0	0	0	0
Aston Villa	Total		0	0	0	0	0	0	0	0	0	0
Wycombe Wanderers (loan)	2015–16	League Two	8	0	0	0	0	0	0	0	8	0
Cheltenham Town	2017–18	League Two	31	2	1	0	1	0	2	0	35	2
Östersunds FK	2018	Allsvenskan	6	1	0	0	0	0	0	0	6	1
Östersunds FK	2019	Allsvenskan	5	0	3	1	0	0	0	0	8	1
Östersunds FK	2020	Allsvenskan	10	1	0	0	0	0	0	0	10	1
Östersunds FK	2021	Allsvenskan	12	0	5	2	0	0	0	0	17	2
Östersunds FK	Total		33	2	8	3	0	0	0	0	41	5
Career total			72	4	9	3	1	0	2	0	84	7
