= Jaanai Gordon =

English footballer (born 1995)

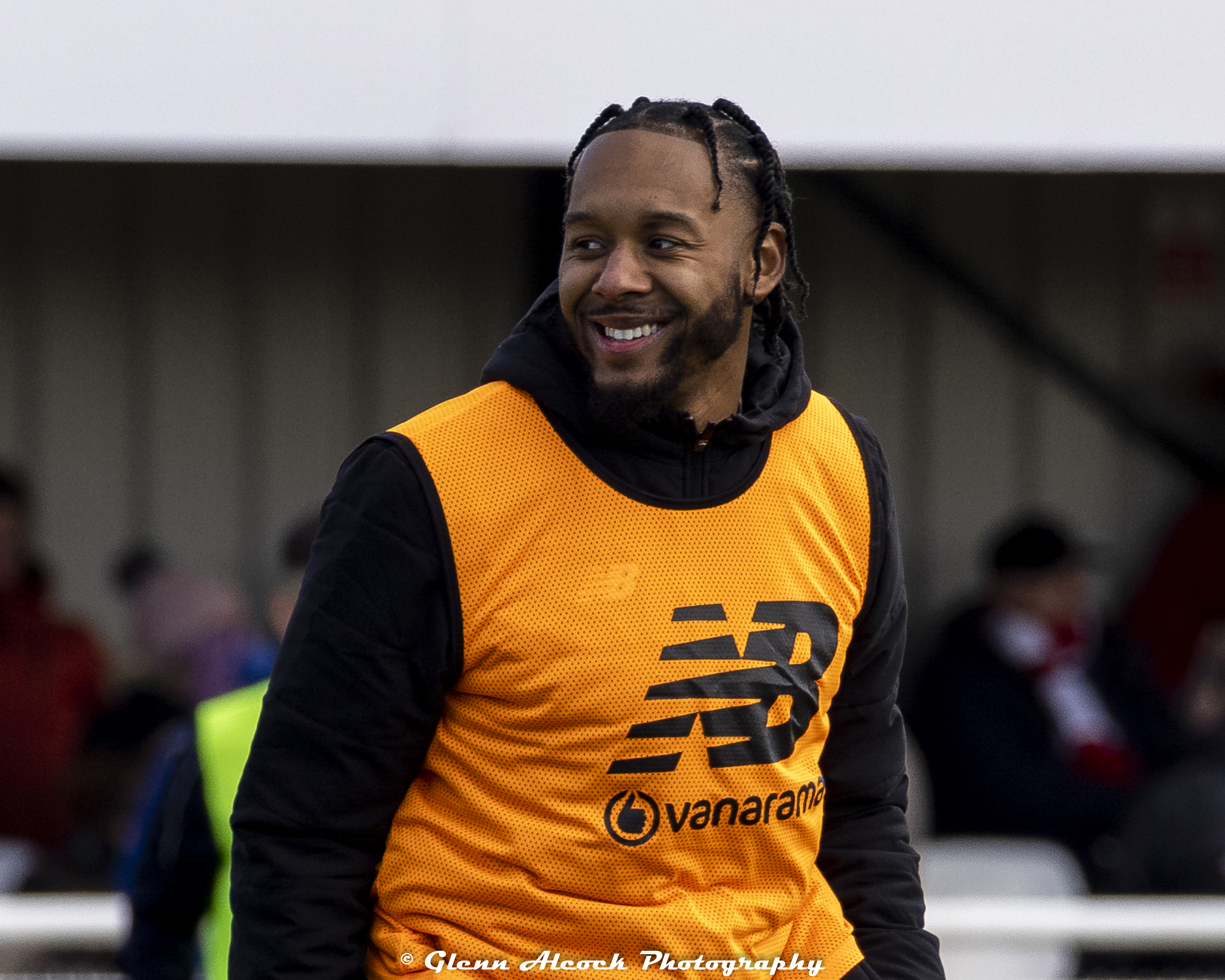
- Gordon in February 2019

Personal information
- Full name: Jaanai Derece Gordon-Hutton
- Date of birth: 7 December 1995 (age 30)
- Place of birth: Northampton, England
- Height: 1.82 m (6 ft 0 in)
- Position: Forward

Team information
- Current team: Alvechurch

Youth career
- –2009: Luton Town
- 2009–2011: Peterborough United

Senior career*
Years	Team	Apps	(Gls)
2011–2014	Peterborough United	4	(0)
2014–2017	West Ham United	0	(0)
2014–2015	→ Chelmsford City (loan)	10	(5)
2015	→ Nuneaton Town (loan)	5	(1)
2016	→ Sligo Rovers (loan)	10	(1)
2017	→ Newport County (loan)	10	(1)
2017–2018	Cheltenham Town	4	(0)
2019	Tamworth	12	(2)
2019	Banbury United	16	(13)
2019–2020	Oxford City	14	(2)
2020	Tamworth	4	(0)
2020–2021	Banbury United	2	(0)
2021	Stratford Town	12	(5)
2021–2022	Hereford	12	(5)
2022	Brackley Town	17	(2)
2022–2023	Boston United	11	(1)
2022–2023	→ Banbury United (loan)	10	(0)
2023–	Alvechurch	0	(0)
- * Club domestic league appearances and goals as of 17:05, 3 July 2023 (UTC)

Jaanai Derece Gordon (born 7 December 1995) is an English professional footballer who plays as a forward for Southern League Premier Division Central club Alvechurch.

== Club career ==
=== Peterborough United ===
Born in Northampton, England, Gordon began his career with Peterborough United in 2009 and appeared twice as an unused substitute in the 2011–12 season, having been a first team regular in the youth and development squads. Gordon then signed his first professional contract, in December 2012 on his 17th birthday. By that time he had already made his first team debut, in a 2–0 home defeat by Wolverhampton Wanderers on 22 September 2012. In November 2013, having made four league appearances for Peterborough, Gordon went on trial with Premier League side West Ham United scoring twice in his opening trial game for West Ham under-18 side against Aston Villa under-18s and another two in a 9–0 defeat of Gillingham in a friendly on 11 November 2013. In November 2013, a West Ham United bid for Gordon was rejected by Peterborough United.

=== West Ham United ===
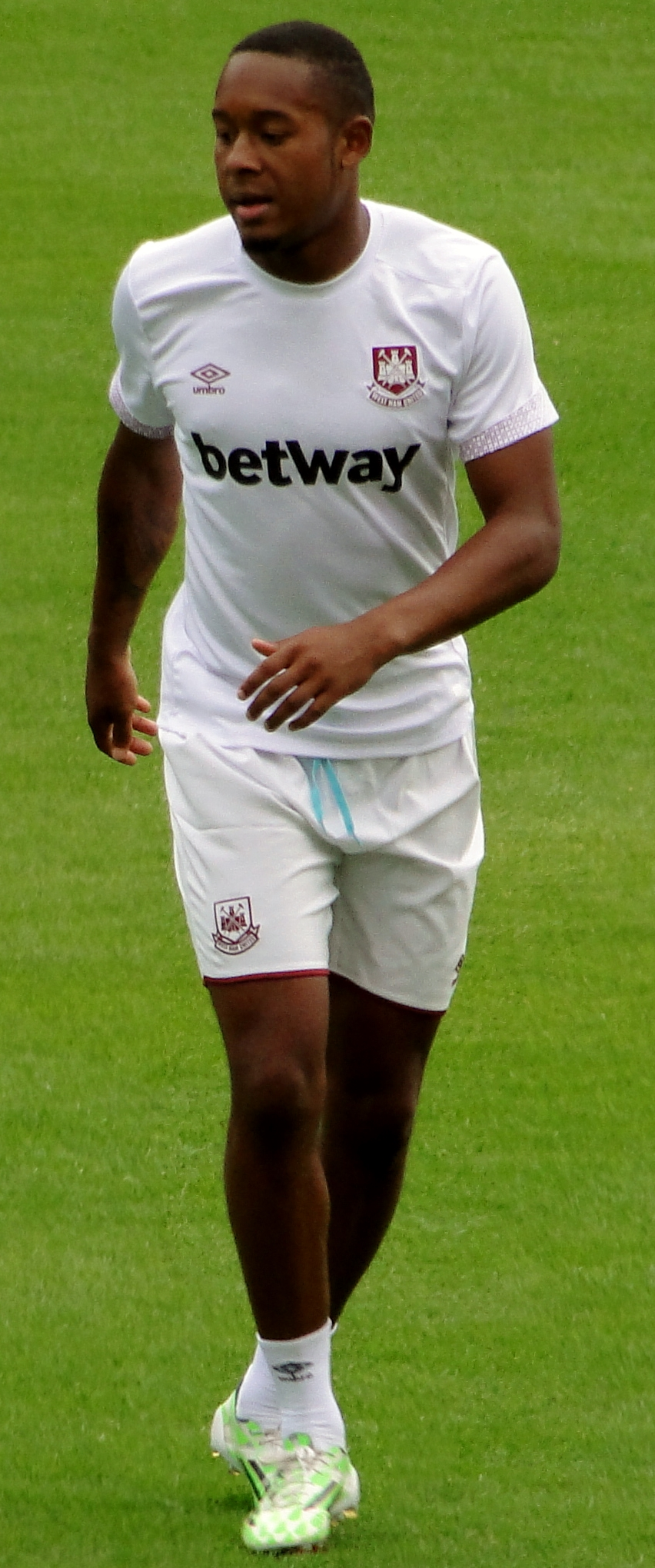
Gordon playing for West Ham United in July 2015.

On 31 December 2013, West Ham United confirmed the signing of Gordon. In January 2014, Gordon was an unused substitute for West Ham's 5–0 FA Cup defeat by Nottingham Forest.

==== Loan spells ====
Gordon joined Chelmsford City on loan for a month on 22 December 2014. Several days later, he scored on his debut, in 5–1 home defeat by Ebbsfleet United. Gordon then scored in his next game, a 5–3 away win against Staines Town, followed up by scoring his third goal, a 2–0 away win against Ebbsfleet United and in his fourth game, a 6–2 home win against Farnborough Town, Gordon scored twice and provided two assists. On 23 January 2015, his loan spell with Chelmsford City was extended by a month. Gordon then ended his loan spell with the club the following month.

On 26 March 2015, Gordon joined Nuneaton Town on loan until 1 May 2015. Gordon made his Nuneaton Town soon after on 28 March 2015, making his first start, in a 2–1 loss against Halifax Town. In his fourth appearance for the club, he scored his first Nuneaton Town goal, in a 1–1 draw against Woking on 18 April 2015. Gordon made his last appearance in the last game of the season, in a 5–3 loss against Chester.

On 18 January 2016, Gordon joined League of Ireland side Sligo Rovers on loan until the end of August ahead of the 2016 League of Ireland season. Gordon made his Sligo Rovers debut in the opening game of the season against Shamrock Rovers, which saw them lose 2–0. Gordon then scored his first goal for the club on 7 May 2016, netting the final goal of the match as Sligo Rovers ran out 4–1 victors at home to Wexford Youths. After making ten appearances and scoring once, Gordon returned to West Ham in June 2016.

On 1 January 2017, Gordon joined League Two side Newport County on loan until the end of the 2016–17 season. He made his debut for Newport in the starting line-up in a 3–1 defeat to Stevenage in League Two on 7 January. Gordon scored his first goal for Newport on 4 February in a League Two 1–1 draw with Cheltenham Town.

=== Cheltenham Town ===
With mutual consent to leave West Ham still in contract, Gordon signed in September 2017 for Cheltenham Town. On 10 May 2018, it was announced that Gordon would leave Cheltenham at the end of his current deal in June 2018 during a long-term injury period which put Gordon out for the foreseeable.

=== Tamworth ===
Gordon joined Southern League Premier Division Central side Tamworth, initially as a trialist on a non-contract, in the hope that he could regain match fitness following on from a long injury lay off during his time at Cheltenham Town.

He played his first game in a Staffordshire FA Senior Cup tie away at Kidsgrove Athletic, which they were defeated 6–0, but following on from the departure of striker Michael Taylor, Gordon was in contention to make his league debut at hone to Bedworth United.

However Gordon's league debut for Tamworth came in the next home game, against St Neots Town on 9 February 2019, coming on as an 81st-minute substitute for Tyrell Waite in a 5–0 victory for the home side.

Gordon scored his first goal for Tamworth on 2 March 2019, scoring the fourth goal in a 4–1 home victory against Halesowen Town.

=== Banbury United ===
On 16 August 2019, Gordon was announced as signing for Southern League Premier Division Central side Banbury United.

=== Oxford City ===
After an impressive start to 2019–20, Gordon was announced as signing for National League South side Oxford City.

=== Tamworth ===
On 19 September 2020, Jaanai was announced as re-signing for Southern League Premier Division Central side Tamworth. Gordon made his second debut the same day as Tamworth drew 1–1 away at Peterborough Sports on the opening day of the season.

=== Stratford Town ===
In August 2021 Gordon signed for Stratford Town. He scored on his debut against Coalville Town on 14 August. On 16 October Gordon scored the equaliser in a 1-1 draw against Boston United in the club's FA Cup 4th Qualifying Round match. Three days later, he scored the opening two goals in the replay as part of a 3-2 victory which saw Stratford qualify for the first round proper of the FA Cup for the first time in their history.

=== Hereford ===
Gordon signed for National League North side Hereford on 16 November 2021 on a dual registration basis.

=== Brackley Town ===
On 22 February 2022, he signed for fellow National League North side Brackley Town after the club had made a seven-day approach for Gordon, even after Hereford offered him more money to stay.

=== Boston United ===
After a second-placed finish before being defeated in the play-offs, Gordon left Brackley at the end of the 2021–22 season to join league rivals Boston United. On 9 December 2022, Gordon rejoined former club Banbury United on loan until 7 March 2023.

=== Alvechurch ===
On 30 June 2023, Gordon signed for Southern League Premier Division Central club Alvechurch.

== Career statistics ==
=== Club ===
As of end of 2022–23 season

Appearances and goals by club, season and competition
Club	Season	League			National Cup		League Cup		Other		Total	
Club	Season	Division	Apps	Goals	Apps	Goals	Apps	Goals	Apps	Goals	Apps	Goals
Peterborough United	2012–13	Championship	3	0	1	0	0	0	0	0	4	0
Peterborough United	2013–14	League One	1	0	0	0	1	0	1 (Note: Appearances in the Football League Trophy)	0	3	0
Peterborough United	Total		4	0	1	0	1	0	1	0	7	0
Chelmsford City (loan)	2014–15	National League South	10	5	0	0	—		0	0	10	5
Nuneaton Borough (loan)	2014–15	Conference Premier	5	1	0	0	—		0	0	5	1
Sligo Rovers (loan)	2016	League of Ireland Premier	12	1	0	0	1	0	0	0	13	1
West Ham United U23s	2016–17	Premier League 2	—						2	0	2	0
Newport County (loan)	2016–17	League Two	10	1	0	0	0	0	0	0	10	1
Cheltenham Town	2017–18	League Two	4	0	0	0	0	0	0	0	4	0
Tamworth	2018–19	Southern League Premier Central	12	2	0	0	—		1	0	13	2
Banbury United	2019–20	Southern League Premier Central	16	13	2	2	—		2 (Note: Appearances in the FA Trophy)	1	20	16
Oxford City	2019–20	National League South	14	2	—		—		—		14	2
Tamworth	2020–21	Southern League Premier Central	4	0	3	2	—		—		7	2
Banbury United	2020–21	Southern League Premier Central	2	0	—		—		1	1	3	1
Stratford Town	2021–22	Southern League Premier Central	12	5	6	4	—		—		18	9
Hereford	2021–22	National League North	12	5	—		—		1	0	13	5
Brackley Town	2021–22	National League North	17	2	—		—		—		17	2
Boston United	2022–23	National League North	11	1	1	1	—		1	1	13	3
Banbury United (loan)	2022–23	National League North	10	0	—		—		0	0	10	0
Career total			155	38	13	9	2	0	9	3	178	50
