= Jonathan Flatt =

English footballer

Personal information
- Full name: Jonathan James Harrison Flatt
- Date of birth: 12 September 1994 (age 32)
- Place of birth: Wolverhampton, England
- Position: Goalkeeper

Team information
- Current team: Wolverhampton Wanderers Academy (goalkeeping coach)

Youth career
- –2014: Wolverhampton Wanderers

Senior career*
Years	Team	Apps	(Gls)
2014–2018	Wolverhampton Wanderers	0	(0)
2014–2015	→ Wrexham (loan)	3	(0)
2015	→ Chesterfield (loan)	0	(0)
2016	→ Cheltenham Town (loan)	10	(0)
2017	→ Barrow (loan)	21	(0)
2017–2018	→ Cheltenham Town (loan)	4	(0)
2018	→ Kidderminster Harriers (loan)	3	(0)
2018–2019	Scunthorpe United	0	(0)
2019–2020	Rushall Olympic		
Total		41	(0)
- * Club domestic league appearances and goals as of 00:00, 7 November 2019 (UTC)

Jonathan James Harrison Flatt (born 12 September 1994) is an English footballer who ended his playing career playing for Southern League Premier Division Central side Rushall Olympic, where he played as a goalkeeper. He is U18 goalkeeper coach at Wolverhampton Wanderers.

== Playing career ==
=== Wolverhampton Wanderers ===
Flatt is a product of Wolverhampton Wanderers' academy, having been at the club since the age of eight. He signed his first professional contract with the club in 2014, but never made a senior appearance in a competitive fixture for them.

He made his senior football debut for Wrexham during a loan spell in 2014 during which he made five appearances in total. He then went out on loan to Chesterfield in 2015, but failed to make an appearance.

He was then loaned out to Cheltenham Town where he made 10 appearances towards the end of the 2015–16 season, helping the club win the National League title.

In January 2017, he joined National League club Barrow on loan for the rest of the 2016–17 season, during which he made 25 appearances in all competitions.

In June 2017, he rejoined Cheltenham Town on a season-long loan, but was recalled 6 months later, after only making 7 appearances in all competitions for the League Two side.

In February 2018, he joined National League North club Kidderminster Harriers on loan for a month.

He was released by Wolves at the end of the 2017–18 season.

=== Scunthorpe United ===
On 10 July 2018, he signed a one-year deal with League One club Scunthorpe United after a successful trial.

He was released by Scunthorpe at the end of the 2018–19 season.

=== Rushall Olympic ===
On 23 August 2019, Flatt was confirmed as signing for Southern League Premier Division Central side Rushall Olympic.

== Coaching career ==
After retiring from professional football, Flatt became a goalkeeping coach at Aston Villa. After 2 years at Villa, Flatt would return to Wolverhampton Wanderers in late 2022 as a goalkeeping coach for the Wolves academy, linking up with Tony Roberts.

== Honours ==
Cheltenham Town

- National League: 2015–16

== Career statistics ==
=== Club ===
As of match played 10 March 2018

Appearances and goals by club, season and competition
Club	Season	League			FA Cup		League Cup		Other		Total	
Club	Season	Division	Apps	Goals	Apps	Goals	Apps	Goals	Apps	Goals	Apps	Goals
Wrexham (loan)	2014–15	Conference Premier	3	0	2	0	~	~	2 (Note: Appearances in the FA Trophy)	0	7	0
Cheltenham Town (loan)	2015–16	Conference Premier	10	0	0	0	~	~	0	0	10	0
Wolverhampton Wanderers U23s	2016–17		~	~	~	~	~	~	1 (Note: Appearance in the EFL Trophy)	0	1	0
Barrow (loan)	2016–17	National League	21	0	1	0	~	~	3	0	25	0
Cheltenham Town (loan)	2017–18	League Two	4	0	0	0	2	0	1	0	7	0
Kidderminster Harriers (loan)	2017–18	National League North	3	0	0	0	0	0	0	0	3	0
Career total			41	0	3	0	2	0	7	0	53	0
