= Adam Page (footballer) =

English footballer

Personal information
- Full name: Adam Richard Page
- Date of birth: 30 May 1997 (age 29)
- Place of birth: Worcester, England
- Height: 1.77 m (5 ft 9 1/2 in)
- Position: Midfielder

Youth career
- 2013–2015: Cheltenham Town

Senior career*
Years	Team	Apps	(Gls)
2015–2018	Cheltenham Town	0	(0)
2015–2016	→ Hereford (loan)	18	(8)
2017	→ Gloucester City (loan)	2	(0)
2017	→ Hereford (loan)	9	(0)
2018	→ Redditch United (loan)	21	(6)
2018	Gloucester City	11	(0)
2018	→ Evesham United (loan)	6	(0)
2018–2019	Rushall Olympic	8	(0)
2019–2020	Evesham United	35	(6)
- * Club domestic league appearances and goals as of 22:21, 7 December 2020 (UTC)

Adam Richard Page (born 30 May 1997) is an English footballer who last played for Evesham United, where he plays as a midfielder.

== Club career ==
Page signed his first professional deal with Cheltenham Town in July 2015, after a two-year spell in the academy on a BTEC scholarship under the tutelage of development manager Alex Penny. Following this, Page joined Midland Football League Premier Division side Hereford on loan. After an impressive spell at Hereford, Page returned to Cheltenham in January 2016, however, then suffered a serious knee injury in July 2016 which ruled him out for the majority of the 2016–17 campaign. Following a successful recovery from a knee injury, Page signed a new one-year deal with Cheltenham for the forthcoming campaign. On 8 August 2017, Page made his debut for Cheltenham during their EFL Cup tie against Oxford United, which resulted in a 4–3 victory for the Robins.

Following two first-team appearances for Cheltenham in the EFL Cup and EFL Trophy, Page joined National League South side Gloucester City until January 2018.

In September 2017, after making just two appearances, he was recalled from his loan with Gloucester City and rejoined Hereford on a loan deal until January. Page's loan was cut short in December 2017, after featuring eighteen times in all competitions including five appearances in their famous FA Cup run.

On 1 January 2018, Page joined Southern League Premier Division side, Redditch United on a one-month loan deal. On the same day, he made his debut against his former club, Hereford, in a 5–2 away defeat. Page went onto appear twenty-two more times, scoring seven goals before returning to Cheltenham at the end of the season.

On 10 May 2018, it was announced that Page would leave Cheltenham at the end of his current deal in June 2018. He then joined Gloucester City for the 2018/19 campaign.

On 22 December 2018, Page left Gloucester City to join Southern League Premier Central club Rushall Olympic.

== Career statistics ==
As of match played 28 April 2018.

Appearances and goals by club, season and competition
Club	Season	League			FA Cup		EFL Cup		Other		Total	
Club	Season	Division	Apps	Goals	Apps	Goals	Apps	Goals	Apps	Goals	Apps	Goals
Cheltenham Town	2017–18	League Two	0	0	—		1	0	1 (Note: Appearance(s) in EFL Trophy)	0	2	0
Gloucester City (loan)	2017–18	National League South	2	0	—		—		0	0	2	0
Hereford (loan)	2017–18	Southern League Premier Division	9	0	5	0	—		4 (Note: Appearance(s) in FA Trophy)	0	18	0
Redditch United (loan)	2017–18	Southern League Premier Division	22	7	—		—		1 (Note: Appearance(s) in Southern League Cup)	0	23	7
Career total			33	7	5	0	1	0	6	0	45	7
