= Jake Andrews (footballer) =

English footballer (born 1997)

Personal information
- Full name: Jake Andrews
- Date of birth: 14 October 1997 (age 29)
- Place of birth: Bath, England
- Position: Midfielder

Team information
- Current team: Swindon Supermarine

Youth career
- –2016: Bristol City

Senior career*
Years	Team	Apps	(Gls)
2016–2019	Bristol City	0	(0)
2016–2017	→ Guernsey (loan)	8	(8)
2017	→ Chippenham Town (loan)	12	(4)
2017	→ Chippenham Town (loan)	10	(1)
2018	→ Cheltenham Town (loan)	7	(1)
2018–2019	→ Torquay United (loan)	29	(10)
2019–2022	Torquay United	76	(10)
2021–2022	→ Havant & Waterlooville (loan)	22	(2)
2022	Havant & Waterlooville	2	(0)
2022–2023	Gloucester City	12	(0)
2022–2023	→ Poole Town (loan)	19	(4)
2023–2024	Swindon Supermarine	37	(8)
2024–2026	Melksham Town	50	(12)
2026–	Westbury United	2	(0)
- * Club domestic league appearances and goals as of 13:40, 7 April 2024 (UTC)

Jake Andrews (born 14 October 1997) is an English professional footballer who plays as a midfielder for Southern League Division One South club Swindon Supermarine.

== Club career ==
On 31 January 2018, Andrews joined League Two side Cheltenham Town on loan until the end of the season. He made his English Football League debut as a substitute in Cheltenham's 5–1 victory over Port Vale, on 10 February 2018.

Andrews is the cousin of former Bristol City, Birmingham City, Derby County, Cheltenham Town coach and current first team coach at Brighton & Hove Albion W.F.C. Alex Penny.

On 9 December 2021, Andrews joined National League South side Havant & Waterlooville on loan until the end of the 2021-22 season. Andrews was released at the end of the 2021–22 season.

On 28 June 2022, Andrews returned to Havant & Waterlooville on a permanent basis.

== Career statistics ==
As of match played 1 April 2024

Appearances and goals by club, season and competition
Club	Season	League			FA Cup		EFL Cup		Other		Total	
Club	Season	Division	Apps	Goals	Apps	Goals	Apps	Goals	Apps	Goals	Apps	Goals
Bristol City	2016–17	Championship	0	0	0	0	0	0	—		0	0
Bristol City	2017–18	Championship	0	0	0	0	0	0	—		0	0
Bristol City	2018–19	Championship	0	0	0	0	0	0	—		0	0
Bristol City	Bristol City total		0	0	0	0	0	0	—		0	0
Guernsey (loan)	2016–17	Isthmian League; Division One South	8	8	0	0	—		0	0	8	8
Chippenham Town (loan)	2016–17	Southern League; Premier Division	12	4	0	0	—		0	0	12	4
Chippenham Town (loan)	2017–18	National League South	10	1	1	0	—		0	0	11	1
Chippenham Town (loan)	Chippenham Town total		22	5	1	0	—		0	0	23	5
Chetlenham Town (loan)	2017–18	League Two	7	1	0	0	0	0	0	0	7	1
Torquay United (loan)	2018–19	National League South	29	10	3	2	—		2 (Note: Appearance(s) in FA Trophy)	0	34	12
Torquay United	2019–20	National League	32	5	1	1	—		1	0	34	6
Torquay United	2020–21	National League	41	5	1	0	—		4	0	46	5
Torquay United	2021–22	National League	3	0	2	1	—		0	0	5	1
Torquay United	Torquay United total		105	20	7	4	—		7	0	119	24
Havant & Waterlooville (loan)	2021–22	National League South	22	2	—		—		0	0	22	2
Havant & Waterlooville	2022–23	National League South	2	0	0	0	—		0	0	2	0
Havant & Waterlooville	Havant & Waterlooville total		24	2	0	0	—		0	0	24	2
Gloucester City	2022–23	National League North	12	0	0	0	—		2	0	14	0
Poole Town (loan)	2022–23	Southern League; Premier Division South	19	4	1	0	—		1 (Note: Appearance in Dorset Senior Cup)	0	21	4
Swindon Supermarine	2023–24	Southern League; Premier Division South	33	7	1	0	—		2	0	36	7
Career total			230	47	10	4	0	0	12	0	252	51
