= Jens Hegeler =

German footballer (born 1988)

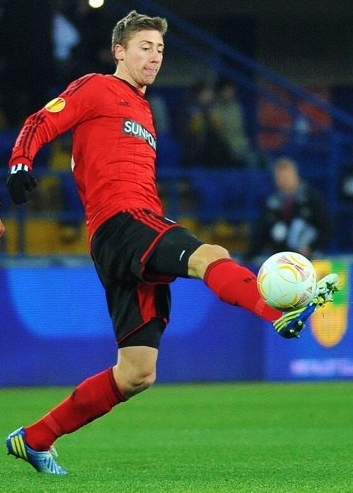
- Hegeler playing for Bayer Leverkusen in 2012

Personal information
- Full name: Jens Hegeler
- Date of birth: 22 January 1988 (age 38)
- Place of birth: Cologne, West Germany
- Height: 1.93 m (6 ft 4 in)
- Position: Midfielder

Youth career
- 1993–1995: SV Westhoven
- 1995–1998: SpVgg Porz
- 1998–2004: 1. FC Köln
- 2004–2005: Yurdumspor Köln
- 2005–2006: VfL Leverkusen
- 2006–2008: Bayer Leverkusen

Senior career*
Years	Team	Apps	(Gls)
2006–2009	Bayer Leverkusen II	38	(5)
2008–2014	Bayer Leverkusen	48	(3)
2009–2010	→ FC Augsburg (loan)	35	(1)
2010–2012	→ 1. FC Nürnberg (loan)	65	(4)
2011	→ 1. FC Nürnberg II (loan)	2	(0)
2014–2017	Hertha BSC	46	(1)
2014	Hertha BSC II	1	(0)
2017–2018	Bristol City	16	(0)
Total		251	(14)

International career
2009	Germany U-21	4	(0)
- * Club domestic league appearances and goals

Jens Hegeler (born 22 January 1988) is a German former professional footballer who played as a midfielder.

== Career ==
=== Youth and early career ===
Hegeler began his career at SV Westhoven in 1993 and moved after two years to SpVgg Porz. He left Porz after three years when he was scouted by 1. FC Köln in 1998. He played six years in Köln's youth team before he moved to Yurdumspor Köln in the German Oberliga in 2004. After one year he left Cologne and moved to VfL Leverkusen. In June 2006 he joined Bayer Leverkusen. He was loaned out to FC Augsburg on 7 January 2009 until the end of the 2009–10 season. In July 2010, he joined 1. FC Nürnberg on a two-season-long loan. Hegeler became a key player in Nürnberg's successful squad and played in every 34 matches of the season. Hegeler returned to Leverkusen at the start of the 2012–13 season.

On 2 October 2013, Hegeler secured a 2–1 win for Leverkusen over Real Sociedad in the Champions League with a stoppage-time free-kick.

=== Hertha BSC ===
On 8 May 2014, he signed a three-year contract with Hertha BSC.

=== Bristol City ===
On 4 January 2017, it was announced by Bristol City that Hegeler had joined them on a 2 1/2-year deal for an undisclosed fee. On 7 January 2017, he made his debut in the FA Cup third-round tie against Fleetwood Town. He scored his first goal for Bristol City in a 5–0 EFL Cup win against Plymouth Argyle on 8 August 2017. On 19 December 2018, it was announced Hegeler had left Bristol City by mutual consent.

== Career statistics ==
Appearances and goals by club, season and competition
Club	Season	League			National cup		League cup		Other		Total	
Club	Season	Division	Apps	Goals	Apps	Goals	Apps	Goals	Apps	Goals	Apps	Goals
Bayer Leverkusen II	2006–07	Regionalliga Nord	1	0	0	0	—		0	0	1	0
Bayer Leverkusen II	2007–08	Oberliga Nordrhein	31	3	1	0	—		0	0	32	3
Bayer Leverkusen II	2008–09	Regionalliga West	6	2	0	0	—		0	0	6	2
Bayer Leverkusen II	Total		38	5	1	0	—		0	0	39	5
Bayer Leverkusen	2007–08	Bundesliga	1	0	0	0	—		0	0	1	0
Bayer Leverkusen	2008–09	Bundesliga	2	0	0	0	—		0	0	2	0
Bayer Leverkusen	2009–10	Bundesliga	0	0	0	0	—		0	0	0	0
Bayer Leverkusen	2010–11	Bundesliga	0	0	0	0	—		0	0	0	0
Bayer Leverkusen	2011–12	Bundesliga	0	0	0	0	—		0	0	0	0
Bayer Leverkusen	2012–13	Bundesliga	27	3	2	1	—		6	1	35	5
Bayer Leverkusen	2013–14	Bundesliga	18	0	3	0	—		5	1	26	1
Bayer Leverkusen	Total		48	3	5	1	—		11	2	64	6
FC Augsburg (loan)	2008–09	2. Bundesliga	11	0	0	0	—		0	0	11	0
FC Augsburg (loan)	2009–10	2. Bundesliga	24	1	4	0	—		2	0	30	1
FC Augsburg (loan)	Total		35	1	4	0	—		2	0	41	1
1. FC Nürnberg (loan)	2010–11	Bundesliga	34	3	4	0	—		0	0	38	3
1. FC Nürnberg (loan)	2011–12	Bundesliga	31	1	3	0	—		0	0	34	1
1. FC Nürnberg (loan)	Total		65	4	7	0	—		0	0	72	4
1. FC Nürnberg II (loan)	2011–12	Regionalliga West	2	0	—		—		—		2	0
Hertha BSC II	2014–15	Regionalliga West	1	0	—		—		—		1	0
Hertha BSC	2014–15	Bundesliga	24	1	2	0	—		0	0	26	1
Hertha BSC	2015–16	Bundesliga	16	0	5	0	—		0	0	21	0
Hertha BSC	2016–17	Bundesliga	6	0	0	0	—		0	0	6	0
Hertha BSC	Total		46	1	7	0	—		0	0	53	1
Bristol City	2016–17	EFL Championship	12	0	3	0	0	0	—		15	0
Bristol City	2017–18	EFL Championship	4	0	0	0	3	1	—		7	1
Bristol City	Total		16	0	3	0	3	1	0	0	22	1
Career total			251	14	27	1	3	1	13	2	294	18
