= Kodi Lyons-Foster =

English footballer (born 1996)

Personal information
- Full name: Kodi Hugh Brian Lyons-Foster
- Date of birth: 19 October 1996 (age 30)
- Place of birth: London, England
- Height: 1.83 m (6 ft 0 in)
- Position: Centre back

Team information
- Current team: Ballymena United (on loan from Coleraine)
- Number: 26

Youth career
- –2013: Tottenham Hotspur
- 2013–2016: Aston Villa
- 2016–2017: Bristol City

Senior career*
Years	Team	Apps	(Gls)
2017–2018	Aldershot Town	6	(0)
2018	→ Whitehawk (loan)	5	(1)
2018	Whitehawk	15	(2)
2018–2019	Braintree Town	39	(1)
2019–2023	Aldershot Town	111	(5)
2022–2023	→ Maidstone United (loan)	9	(0)
2023	→ Welling United (loan)	19	(3)
2023–2024	Tonbridge Angels	27	(4)
2024	Worthing	6	(0)
2024	Hornchurch	3	(0)
2024–2025	Glentoran	27	(2)
2025–	Coleraine	19	(1)
2026–	→ Ballymena United (loan)	2	(0)
- * Club domestic league appearances and goals as of 15 September 2026

Kodi Hugh Brian Lyons-Foster (born 19 October 1996) is an English professional footballer who plays as a centre back for NIFL Premiership club Ballymena United on loan from Coleraine.

== Career ==
Lyons-Foster played in the youth academies of Tottenham Hotspur, Aston Villa and Bristol City. He started his senior career in National League with Aldershot Town in 2017. He played in National League for several clubs until 2024, when he joined Glentoran in Northern Ireland. On 18 May 2025, it was announced that Lyons-Foster would depart from Glentoran and join Coleraine for the 2025–26 NIFL Premiership season.

== Personal life ==
His younger brother Brooklyn is also a professional footballer.
