= Rhys Lovett =

English footballer

- Lovett with Tamworth in September 2026.

Personal information
- Full name: Rhys Lovett
- Date of birth: 15 June 1997 (age 29)
- Place of birth: Birmingham, England
- Height: 1.88 m (6 ft 2 in)
- Position: Goalkeeper

Team information
- Current team: Tamworth
- Number: 39

Youth career
- 2007–2014: Walsall
- 2014: → Aston Villa (loan)
- 2014: → Coventry City (loan)
- 2014–2015: Rochdale

Senior career*
Years	Team	Apps	(Gls)
2015–2020	Cheltenham Town	2	(0)
2015	→ Tiverton Town (loan)	4	(0)
2015–2016	→ Shepton Mallet (loan)	2	(0)
2016–2017	→ Shortwood United (loan)	27	(0)
2020	→ Tiverton Town (loan)	3	(0)
2020–2021	Gloucester City	11	(0)
2021	Maidenhead United	15	(1)
2021–2022	Billericay Town	12	(0)
2022–2024	Torquay United	13	(0)
2024–2025	Welling United	36	(0)
2025–2026	Boston United	26	(0)
2026	Kidderminster Harriers	7	(0)
2026–	Tamworth	3	(0)
- * Club domestic league appearances and goals as of 18:00, 5 September 2026 (UTC)

Rhys Lovett (born 15 June 1997) is an English professional footballer who plays as a goalkeeper for National League club Tamworth.

He spent seven years in the academy at Walsall, from where he was loaned out to the youth teams at Aston Villa and Coventry City. He spent a season with Rochdale's youth-team, before signing with Cheltenham Town in August 2015. From there was loaned out to Tiverton Town, Shepton Mallet and Shortwood United, being named as Shortwood's Player of the Year for the 2016–17 season. He made his first-team debut for Cheltenham in August 2017, but only made a total of seven appearances for the club before he left in June 2020.

== Club career ==
=== Walsall ===
Lovett spent seven years in Walsall's academy, where he had loan spells at Aston Villa and Coventry City.

=== Rochdale ===
Rhys joined Rochdale permanently in 2014.

=== Cheltenham Town ===
He played a pre-season game for Gloucester City in July 2015. Lovett moved on to join Cheltenham Town in August 2015, ahead of their National League campaign.

==== Tiverton Town (loan) ====
Following this, Lovett immediately joined Southern League Division One South & West club Tiverton Town on a short-term loan deal. He made his competitive debut on the opening day of the 2015–16 season, a 2–0 defeat at North Leigh. He played the next three games for Martyn Rogers's "Yellows".

==== Shepton Mallet (loan) ====
He joined Shepton Mallet on a one-month loan on 19 December 2015.

==== Return to Cheltenham Town ====
Upon returning to Cheltenham Town, he remained Gary Johnson's third choice goalkeeper at Cheltenham for the title winning season of 2015–16, behind Dillon Phillips/Jonathan Flatt and Calum Kitscha.

==== Shortwood United (loan) ====
He spent the 2016–17 season on loan at Southern League Division One South & West side Shortwood United, where he was named as the club's Player of the Year.

==== Return to Cheltenham Town ====
He signed a new contract at Cheltenham in April 2018.

He made his first-team debut for Cheltenham on 15 August 2017, in an EFL Trophy tie against Swansea City U23s at Whaddon Road, which resulted in a 2–1 defeat. With regular custodian Scott Flinders undergoing surgery, Lovett made his League Two debut for Cheltenham on the final day of the 2017–18 season, a 2–1 defeat at Crewe Alexandra. He featured in one EFL Trophy game in the 2018–19 campaign and signed a new one-year contract in May 2019. He played four times during the 2019–20 season, replacing Flinders 62 minutes into a 3–0 victory over Oldham Athletic.

==== Tiverton Town (loan) ====
He then returned on loan to Tiverton Town following the signing of loanee Owen Evans.

==== Return to Cheltenham Town ====
He left at the end of his contract in June 2020. He thanked goalkeeping coach Steve Book but said that "Robins" boss Michael Duff told him that he was unable him offer him the first-team games he needed at that point in his career. He had a trial at Port Vale in August 2020.

=== Gloucester City ===
Lovett signed for Gloucester City in October 2020. He played 14 times in all competitions before leaving the club in March 2021 to seek first-team football after the National League North season was declared null and void.

=== Maidenhead United ===
Rhys signed for Maidenhead United on 26 March 2021. He made his debut on 1 May against King's Lynn Town, deputising for the injured Taye Ashby-Hammond. On the final day of the season, he came on as substitute against Boreham Wood to play as a forward, and even scored in the 93rd minute.

=== Billericay Town ===
Lovett left Maidenhead on 17 December 2021, before signing for Billericay Town the same day.

=== Torquay United ===
On 15 July 2022, Lovett returned to the National League to join Torquay United.

=== Welling United ===
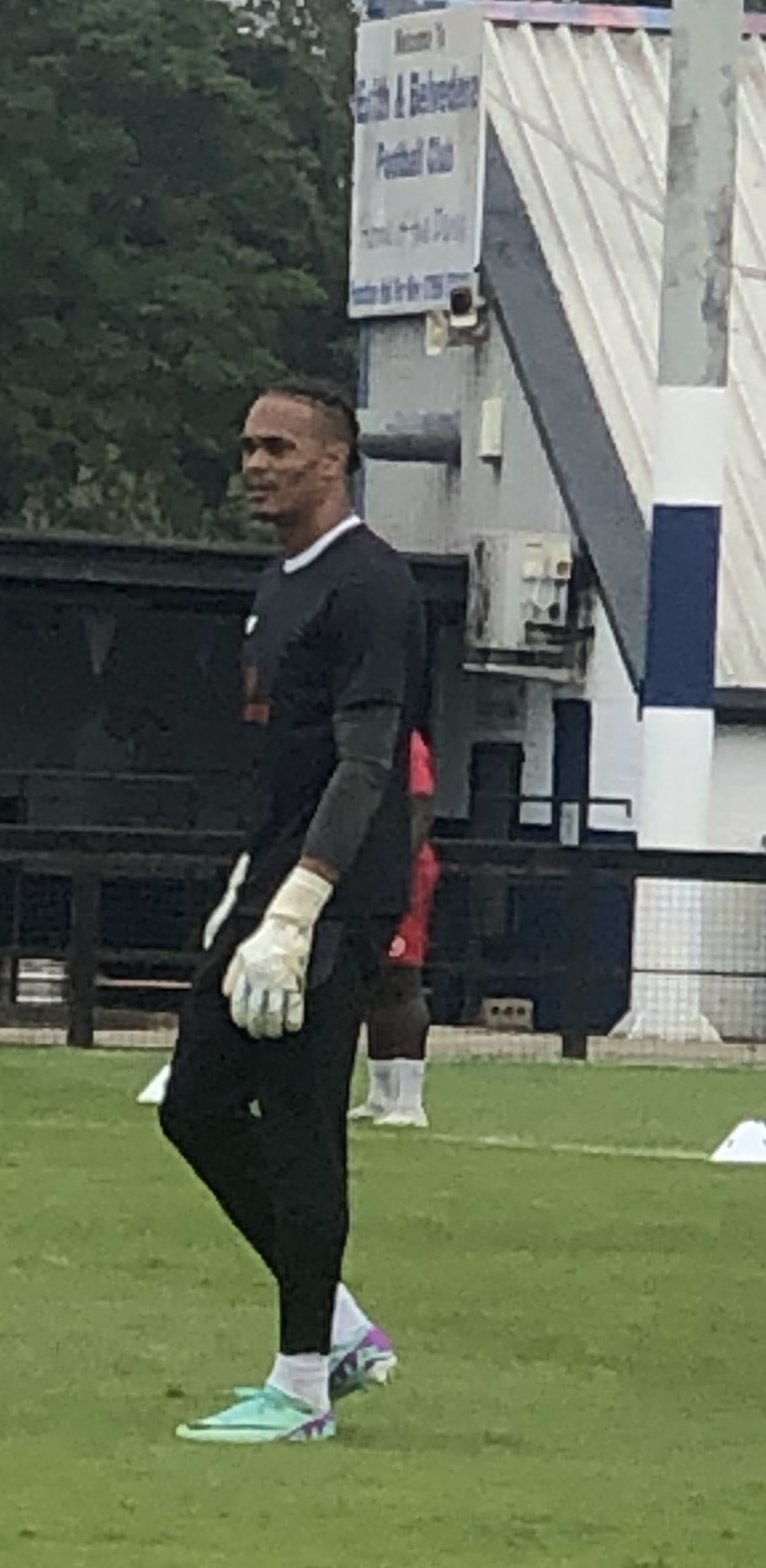
Lovett playing for Welling United in August 2024.

In July 2024, Lovett made his move to National League South club Welling United on a one-year deal. In his first few months with the club, he impressively won two Player of the Month awards, showcasing his exceptional performance and contribution to the team. Lovett helped Welling United win the Kent Senior Cup by keeping a clean sheet in the final against Ebbsfleet United on the 2nd of April 2025. He finished the season gaining Team of the Half Season, winning three Player of the Month awards, and receiving the Manager's Player of the Year, Supporters' Player of the Year, and Players' Player of the Year accolades.

=== Boston United ===
On 27 May 2025, Lovett joined National League side Boston United on an initial one-year deal with the option for a further season.

On 16 August 2025, Rhys made his debut for Boston United, on the opening day of the 2025–26 season, playing the full match and helping his new side to a 3–2 away victory over Aldershot Town. Rhys kept his first clean sheet in the National League for Boston United on 24 September 2025, in a 2–0 home victory over Braintree Town.

Lovett went on to make 26 appearances for Boston United.

=== Kidderminster Harriers ===
In March 2026, he joined National League North club Kidderminster Harriers. On 1 June 2026, Harriers confirmed Lovett would depart on the expiry of his contract.

=== Tamworth ===
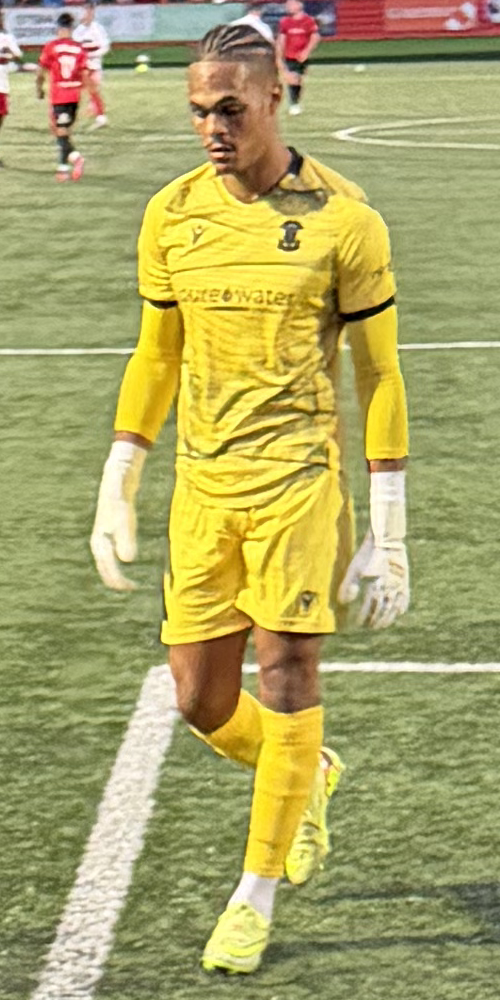
Lovett playing for Tamworth in August 2026.

On 7 August 2026, Lovett joined National League club Tamworth on a one-year deal. Rhys made his debut for Tamworth on 18 August 2026, in a National League Cup fixture at home to Newcastle United. Tamworth won the fixture 5–3. Lovett made his National League debut for Tamworth on 29 August 2026 in a home fixture against Worthing. He played the full match, helping Tamworth achieve their first league victory of the season winning the match 3–2.

== Career statistics ==
As of match played 5 September 2026.

Appearances and goals by club, season and competition
Club	Season	League			FA Cup		EFL Cup		Other		Total	
Club	Season	Division	Apps	Goals	Apps	Goals	Apps	Goals	Apps	Goals	Apps	Goals
Cheltenham Town	2015–16	National League	0	0	0	0	—		0	0	0	0
Cheltenham Town	2016–17	League Two	0	0	0	0	0	0	0	0	0	0
Cheltenham Town	2017–18	League Two	1	0	0	0	0	0	1 (Note: Appearance(s) in EFL Trophy)	0	2	0
Cheltenham Town	2018–19	League Two	0	0	0	0	0	0	1	0	1	0
Cheltenham Town	2019–20	League Two	1	0	0	0	0	0	3	0	4	0
Cheltenham Town	Total		2	0	0	0	0	0	5	0	7	0
Tiverton Town (loan)	2015–16	Southern League Division One South & West	4	0	0	0	—		0	0	4	0
Shepton Mallet (loan)	2015–16	Western Football League Premier Division	2	0	0	0	—		0	0	2	0
Shortwood United (loan)	2016–17	Southern League Division One South & West	27	0	1	0	—		3 (Note: Two appearances in Southern League Cup, one in FA Trophy)	0	31	0
Tiverton Town (loan)	2019–20	Southern League Premier Division South	3	0	0	0	—		0	0	3	0
Gloucester City	2020–21	National League North	11	0	0	0	—		3 (Note: Appearance(s) in FA Trophy)	0	14	0
Maidenhead United	2020–21	National League	5	1	0	0	—		0	0	5	1
Maidenhead United	2021–22	National League	10	0	1	0	—		0	0	11	0
Maidenhead United	Total		15	1	1	0	—		0	0	16	1
Billericay Town	2021–22	National League South	12	0	0	0	—		0	0	12	0
Torquay United	2022–23	National League	7	0	1	0	—		0	0	8	0
Torquay United	2023–24	National League South	6	0	0	0	—		2	0	8	0
Torquay United	Total		13	0	1	0	—		2	0	16	0
Welling United	2024–25	National League South	36	0	0	0	—		0	0	36	0
Boston United	2025–26	National League	26	0	0	0	—		0	0	26	0
Kidderminster Harriers	2025–26	National League North	7	0	0	0	—		0	0	7	0
Tamworth	2026–27	National League	3	0	0	0	—		1 (Note: One appearance in National League Cup)	0	4	0
Career total			161	1	3	0	0	0	14	0	178	1

== Honours ==
Cheltenham Town

- National League: 2015–16

Kidderminster Harriers

- National League North play-offs: 2026

Individual

- Shortwood United Player of the Year: 2016–17
- Welling United Supporters Player of the Year: 2024-25
- Welling United Players Player of the Year: 2024-25
- Welling United Managers Player of the Year: 2024-25
