= Rob Lainton =

English footballer

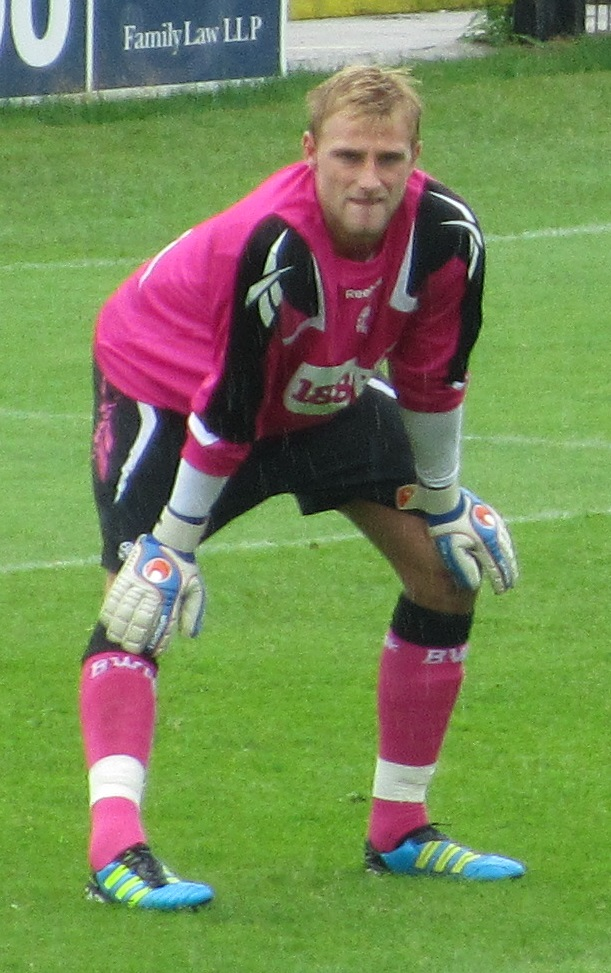
- Lainton playing for Bolton Wanderers during pre-season in 2011

Personal information
- Full name: Robert Paul Lainton
- Date of birth: 12 October 1989 (age 37)
- Place of birth: Ashton-under-Lyne, England
- Height: 6 ft 4 in (1.93 m)
- Position: Goalkeeper

Youth career
- 2004–2010: Bolton Wanderers

Senior career*
Years	Team	Apps	(Gls)
2010–2013	Bolton Wanderers	0	(0)
2013–2016	Bury	31	(0)
2014	→ Burton Albion (loan)	14	(0)
2016–2017	Bury	7	(0)
2017	→ Cheltenham Town (loan)	1	(0)
2017–2018	Port Vale	6	(0)
2018	→ Wrexham (loan)	9	(0)
2018–2024	Wrexham	115	(0)
2025	Altrincham	7	(0)
Total		191	(0)
- * Club domestic league appearances and goals

Robert Paul Lainton (born 12 October 1989) is an English former professional footballer who played as a goalkeeper.

Lainton turned professional at Bolton Wanderers in March 2011 but never played a first-team game for the club. He joined Bury in July 2013 and would go on to play 45 games for the club over the next four seasons, 22 of which came in their 2014–15 promotion campaign out of League Two; he was a free agent for the first half of the 2016–17 season in between being released and re-signed by Bury. He also played 14 games on loan at Burton Albion in the second half of the 2013–14 season and played one game on an emergency loan at Cheltenham Town in April 2017. He signed with Port Vale in June 2017. After struggling with injury during his first season at the club, he was allowed to sign with Wrexham after a spell on loan at the Welsh club. He was named Wrexham's Player of the Season for the 2018–19 campaign. Wrexham won the National League title at the end of the 2022–23 campaign. He spent six years with Wrexham and signed with Altrincham in February 2025.

== Career ==
=== Bolton Wanderers ===
Lainton came through the Academy at Bolton Wanderers, and began the 2009–10 season as the club's first choice goalkeeper in the Premier Reserve League under coach Alan Cork. In March 2011, Lainton signed his first (two-year) professional contract with the club. Although a regular in the first-team squad and on the bench, he never made a senior appearance for the "Trotters". Lainton was also listed on loan on two occasions, but no clubs were interested. Speaking in July 2012, manager Owen Coyle said that Lainton "had a terrible time with injuries last year". Following nine years at the Reebok Stadium, Lainton was released by manager Dougie Freedman in summer 2013.

=== Bury ===
After leaving Bolton Wanderers, Lainton had a trial spell at Championship side Doncaster Rovers. In July 2013, he signed a two-year contract at League Two club Bury after a successful trial to become "Shakers" boss Kevin Blackwell's sixth summer signing. He made his Football League debut in a 2–0 home to Chesterfield at Gigg Lane on 3 August. After making six straight appearances in all competitions from the start of the 2013–14 season, Lainton suffered a shoulder injury. After recovering from his injury, Lainton struggled to make a return to the first-team after being dislodged by newly signed goalkeeper Brian Jensen.

Lainton remained as a second-choice goalkeeper at Bury until 8 February 2014, when he joined divisional rivals Burton Albion on a one-month loan to fill in for injured custodian Dean Lyness; he kept a clean sheet on his debut in a 1–0 victory at Morecambe later that same day. However, ten days later he punched a high ball into his own net to gift Rochdale the equaliser in a 1–1 draw at Spotland; manager Gary Rowett backed Lainton, saying "we write it off and move on". On 11 March, Lainton extended his loan stay with the "Brewers" until the end of the 2013–14 season. Lainton remained the first choice goalkeeper at the Pirelli Stadium, making 14 appearances until he came off as a substitute at half-time after dislocating his thumb during a 1–0 defeat to Northampton Town on 12 April. The injury caused him to miss the last seven matches of the campaign, including the play-off final defeat to Fleetwood Town.

Upon his return to Bury, Lainton competed with Shwan Jalal for the position of first-choice goalkeeper and made his first appearance against his former club Bolton in the opening round of the League Cup, coming on as a substitute for Jalal after he was injured during the match; the game ended in a 3–2 defeat following extra time. Lainton continued to be the first choice goalkeeper for the club until the arrival of Scott Loach and Nick Pope, at which point manager David Flitcroft placed Lainton as second-choice goalkeeper and listed him as available to be loaned out. He stayed put however and made a total of 17 league appearances during the 2014–15 campaign as Bury secured automatic promotion to League One. He signed a new one-year contract in May 2015. He began the 2015–16 season in excellent form after taking over from the injured Christian Walton, and was named in the Football League Team of the Week after making "a number of superb stops" in a 1–0 win at Colchester United on 3 October. However, he was sidelined with a groin tear he picked up in October. He failed to win back his first-team spot after recovering from his injury.

In April 2016, he was told that his Bury contract would not be renewed. He was however, re-signed on a pay-as-you-play deal by Chris Brass in December, and was described as looking "surprisingly sharp" as he kept a clean sheet in a 0–0 draw at Fleetwood Town on Boxing day. The next month he signed a contract to keep him at the club until the end of the 2016–17 season. However, he picked up another injury and lost his first-team place to new signing Joe Murphy. On 7 April 2017, he joined Gary Johnson's Cheltenham Town on a seven-day emergency loan deal, as Calum Kitscha was injured and loanee Scott Brown was unavailable to play against his parent club Wycombe Wanderers. He did not feature at Bury after Lee Clark was appointed manager in February, and was released by the club for a second time three months later.

=== Port Vale ===
Lainton signed a two-year contract with newly-relegated League Two side Port Vale in June 2017. He started the 2017–18 season as the club's first choice goalkeeper, but had to be taken off with a thigh injury at half-time during the opening round of the EFL Cup and was ruled out of action for four weeks. He returned to action for two more games before he was forced to leave a 1–0 defeat at Coventry City early in the second half after damaging his ankle; he was subsequently ruled out of action for two months. Following his return to fitness he found himself on the bench behind Ryan Boot. Manager Neil Aspin put him back into the starting eleven on 27 January in a 2–2 draw with Colchester United at Vale Park, and though Lainton put in a poor display he kept his place for the following home game with Morecambe, and rewarded Aspin's faith in him with an excellent performance a clean sheet in a 0–0 draw. However, after picking up yet another injury he dropped behind Sam Hornby and Ryan Boot in the first-team pecking order by the end of the 2017–18 season and was transfer-listed in May 2018.

=== Wrexham ===
On 6 July 2018, Lainton signed for National League side Wrexham on a season-long loan, where he was expected to compete with Christian Dibble for the first-team spot. He made his debut for Sam Ricketts's "Dragons" on the opening day of the 2018–19 season, and kept a clean sheet after saving a penalty from Inih Effiong during a 1–0 victory at Dover Athletic. On 22 November 2018, Lainton made his move a permanent one as he enjoyed a successful start to life at Wrexham, keeping 14 clean sheets in all competitions in the opening three months of the campaign He was named Wrexham's Player of the Season for 2018–19 after keeping 25 clean sheets in all competitions, with 21 of those being in the league, which equalled the club record. Wrexham qualified for the play-offs under manager Bryan Hughes, where they were knocked out following a home defeat to Eastleigh.

He struggled with injuries in the 2019–20 season, leaving deputy Christian Dibble a chance to stand in his place for some matches. Speaking in March, manager Dean Keates said that "Rob has been outstanding for us, he has made good saves and stuff like that". He made 26 appearances in the 2019–20 season, which was permanently suspended on 26 March due to the COVID-19 pandemic in England, with Wrexham in 20th-place. He featured 26 times in the 2020–21 season as Wrexham missed out on a play-off place after drawing with Dagenham & Redbridge on the last day of the season. He was offered a new contract. He featured 33 times in the 2021–22 campaign, but was ruled out for the rest of the season after undergoing an operation following a wrist fracture and dislocation in March. Manager Phil Parkinson signed Lee Camp to act as back-up to Christian Dibble during Lainton's absence. Lainton made his third appearance of the 2022–23 season in Wrexham's 3–1 replay loss to Sheffield United in the fourth round of the FA Cup.

In February 2023, his contract was extended to the end of the 2023–24 season, with the possibility for it to be further extended for an additional year depending on number of appearances. However, he picked up a knee ligament injury the following month that saw him ruled out of action for six weeks. Wrexham won the National League title to secure a place in the EFL at the end of the 2022–23 season. He missed the entirety of the 2023–24 season with what Parkinson described as "an unusual injury" which was corrected with a knee operation. The team secured promotion into League One, and Lainton was released upon the expiry of his contract.

=== Altrincham ===
On 25 February 2025, Lainton signed for National League side Altrincham. He played nine games before his 2024–25 season came to a premature conclusion due to injury. He was released at the end of the season.

== Style of play ==
Speaking in May 2010, Bolton Wanderers reserve team manager John Henry described Lainton as "an infectious character and a real grafter", "a good all-round keeper... a great shot-stopper and kicks well".

== Career statistics ==
Appearances and goals by club, season and competition
Club	Season	League			FA Cup		EFL Cup		Other		Total	
Club	Season	Division	Apps	Goals	Apps	Goals	Apps	Goals	Apps	Goals	Apps	Goals
Bolton Wanderers	2010–11	Premier League	0	0	0	0	0	0	—		0	0
Bolton Wanderers	2011–12	Premier League	0	0	0	0	0	0	—		0	0
Bolton Wanderers	2012–13	Championship	0	0	0	0	0	0	—		0	0
Bolton Wanderers	Total		0	0	0	0	0	0	0	0	0	0
Bury	2013–14	League Two	4	0	0	0	0	0	0	0	4	0
Bury	2014–15	League Two	17	0	2	0	3	0	0	0	22	0
Bury	2015–16	League One	10	0	0	0	0	0	2 (Note: Appearance(s) in the Football League Trophy)	0	12	0
Bury	2016–17	League One	7	0	0	0	0	0	0	0	7	0
Bury	Total		38	0	2	0	3	0	2	0	45	0
Burton Albion (loan)	2013–14	League Two	14	0	—		—		—		14	0
Cheltenham Town (loan)	2016–17	League Two	1	0	—		—		—		1	0
Port Vale	2017–18	League Two	6	0	0	0	1	0	0	0	7	0
Port Vale	2018–19	League Two	0	0	0	0	0	0	0	0	0	0
Port Vale	Total		6	0	0	0	1	0	0	0	7	0
Wrexham	2018–19	National League	44	0	3	0	—		1 (Note: 1 appearance in the National League play-offs, 1 appearance in the FA Trophy)	0	49	0
Wrexham	2019–20	National League	21	0	2	0	—		0	0	24	0
Wrexham	2020–21	National League	26	0	1	0	—		0	0	27	0
Wrexham	2021–22	National League	28	0	2	0	—		0	0	30	0
Wrexham	2022–23	National League	6	0	1	0	—		0	0	7	0
Wrexham	2023–24	League Two	0	0	0	0	0	0	0	0	0	0
Wrexham	Total		125	0	9	0	0	0	1	0	137	0
Altrincham	2024–25	National League	7	0	—		—		2 (Note: 1 appearance in the FA Trophy and 1 appearance in the National League Cup)	0	9	0
Career total			191	0	11	0	4	0	5	0	213	0

== Honours ==
Bury

- League Two third-place promotion: 2014–15

Wrexham

- National League: 2022–23

Individual

- Wrexham Player of the Season: 2018–19
