= Jack Munns =

English footballer (born 1993)

Personal information
- Full name: Jack Frederick Munns
- Date of birth: 18 November 1993 (age 32)
- Place of birth: Dagenham, England
- Height: 5 ft 5 in (1.66 m)
- Position: Midfielder

Youth career
- Leyton Orient
- –2012: Tottenham Hotspur

Senior career*
Years	Team	Apps	(Gls)
2012–2013	Tottenham Hotspur	0	(0)
2012	→ Aldershot Town (loan)	0	(0)
2013–2015	Charlton Athletic	0	(0)
2015–2017	Cheltenham Town	60	(9)
2017–2018	Hartlepool United	17	(1)
2018–2019	Dagenham & Redbridge	26	(2)
2019–2021	Dover Athletic	41	(1)
2021	Boreham Wood	1	(0)
2021–2022	Billericay Town	21	(0)
2022–2023	Hornchurch	17	(2)
2023	Concord Rangers	11	(0)
2023	Hornchurch	0	(0)
2023	Chatham Town	3	(1)
2023–2024	Canvey Island	19	(0)
2024	Welling United	5	(1)
2024	Brentwood Town	0	(0)
2024–2025	Cheshunt	24	(1)
2025	Potters Bar Town	2	(0)
- * Club domestic league appearances and goals as of 00:16, 21 April 2026 (UTC)

Jack Frederick Munns (born 18 November 1993) is an English professional footballer who plays as a midfielder for Potters Bar Town. He played in the Football League for Cheltenham Town.

== Club career ==
=== Early career ===
After starting his footballing career with Leyton Orient, Munns joined Tottenham Hotspur at a young age. After failing to make a breakthrough at Tottenham, Munns joined League Two side Aldershot Town on a one-month loan deal. However, Munns failed to make an impression under manager Dean Holdsworth, and therefore returned to North London without a senior appearance to his name. On 30 June 2013, Munns was released at the end of his contract with Tottenham.

Preceding his release from Tottenham, Munns joined Championship side Charlton Athletic on a one-year deal. Following an impressive season playing for the Charlton Athletic youth sides, Munns was allocated the squad number 27, for the 2014–15 campaign. Although, Munns appeared on the Charlton bench several times, he failed to make his professional debut under managers Bob Peeters and Guy Luzon.

=== Cheltenham Town ===
On 11 May 2015, Munns joined National League side Cheltenham Town on a one-year deal. On 8 August 2015, Munns made his Cheltenham Town debut in a 1–1 draw against Lincoln City in the opening matchday of the season, scoring the opener within twenty-six minutes. On 3 October 2015, Munns went on to score a hat-trick in a 7–1 thrashing against FC Halifax Town, scoring in the 12th, 91st and 93rd minute. Munns went on to score four more goals in the 2015–16 campaign, as Cheltenham triumphed by winning promotion back into the Football League.

On 9 May 2017, it was announced that Munns would leave Cheltenham upon the expiry of his contract in June 2017.

=== Dagenham & Redbridge ===
On 6 September 2018, he signed for National League side and hometown club Dagenham & Redbridge on a deal until the end of the season, having been on trial. In May 2019, it was announced that he would be released following the expiration of his contract at the end of the 2018–19 campaign.

=== Dover Athletic ===
On 29 May 2019, Munns signed for Dover Athletic on a two-year deal active from 1 July 2019. Following's Dover's decision to not play any more matches in the 2020–21 season, made in late January, and subsequent null and voiding of all results, on 5 May 2021 it was announced that Munns was out of contract and had left the club.

=== Later career ===
In August 2021 he signed for National League side Boreham Wood, making his debut on 21 August in a 2–0 win at Weymouth.

In November 2021 he dropped down a division to sign for National League South side Billericay Town, becoming new manager, Jody Brown's, first signing at the club.

On 1 September 2022, Munns signed for Hornchurch. In February 2023, Munns returned to the National League South with Concord Rangers.

In June 2023, it was announced that Munns had returned to Hornchurch.

On 20 August 2023, Munns signed for Chatham Town.

On 29 March 2024, he joined National League South club Welling United. He departed the club in September 2024.

In November 2024, Munns joined Isthmian League North Division side Brentwood Town, making his debut in an Essex Senior Cup defeat. He joined Isthmian Premier League side Cheshunt later that month, making his debut in a Velocity Cup defeat at Billericay on 19 November.

In July 2025, Munns joined Potters Bar Town, but left the club in September 2025 after two appearances.

== Career statistics ==
As of September 2025

Appearances and goals by club, season and competition
Club	Season	League			FA Cup		League Cup		Other		Total	
Club	Season	Division	Apps	Goals	Apps	Goals	Apps	Goals	Apps	Goals	Apps	Goals
Tottenham Hotspur	2012–13	Premier League	0	0	0	0	0	0	0	0	0	0
Aldershot Town (loan)	2012–13	League Two	0	0	0	0	—		—		0	0
Charlton Athletic	2013–14	Championship	0	0	0	0	0	0	—		0	0
Charlton Athletic	2014–15	Championship	0	0	0	0	0	0	—		0	0
Charlton Athletic	Total		0	0	0	0	0	0	—		0	0
Cheltenham Town	2015–16	National League	42	8	3	0	—		0	0	45	8
Cheltenham Town	2016–17	League Two	18	1	3	0	0	0	4 (Note: Appearances in EFL Trophy)	0	25	1
Cheltenham Town	Total		60	9	6	0	0	0	4	0	70	9
Hartlepool United	2017–18	National League	17	1	2	0	—		0	0	19	1
Dagenham & Redbridge	2018–19	National League	26	2	2	0	—		2 (Note: Appearances in FA Trophy)	0	30	2
Dover Athletic	2019–20	National League	29	1	3	0	—		1	0	33	1
Dover Athletic	2020–21	National League	12	0	1	0	—		0	0	13	0
Dover Athletic	Total		41	1	4	0	—		1	0	46	1
Boreham Wood	2021–22	National League	1	0	0	0	—		—		1	0
Billericay Town	2021–22	National League South	21	0	—		—		2 (Note: Appearances in the Essex Senior Cup)	0	23	0
Hornchurch	2022–23	Isthmian League	17	2	4	1	—		—		21	3
Concord Rangers	2022–23	National League South	11	0	0	0	—		0	0	11	0
Chatham Town	2023–24	Isthmian League Premier Division	3	1	0	0	—		1 (Note: Appearance(s) in Kent Senior Cup)	0	4	1
Canvey Island	2023–24	Isthmian League Premier Division	19	0	0	0	—		2	0	21	0
Welling United	2023–24	National League South	3	1	0	0	—		0	0	3	1
Welling United	2024–25	National League South	2	0	0	0	—		0	0	2	0
Welling United	Total		5	1	0	0	0	0	0	0	5	1
Brentwood Town	2024–25	Isthmian League North Division	0	0	0	0	—		1	0	1	0
Cheshunt	2024–25	Isthmian League Premier Division	24	1	0	0	—		3 (Note: One appearance in Alan Turvey Trophy, two appearances in Herts Senior Cup)	0	27	1
Potters Bar Town	2025–26	Isthmian League Premier Division	2	0	0	0	—		0	0	2	0
Career total			245	18	18	1	0	0	16	0	279	19

== Honours ==
Cheltenham Town

- Vanarama National League: 2015–16

Billericay Town

- Essex Senior Cup: 2021–22
