= Alex Pike =

English footballer

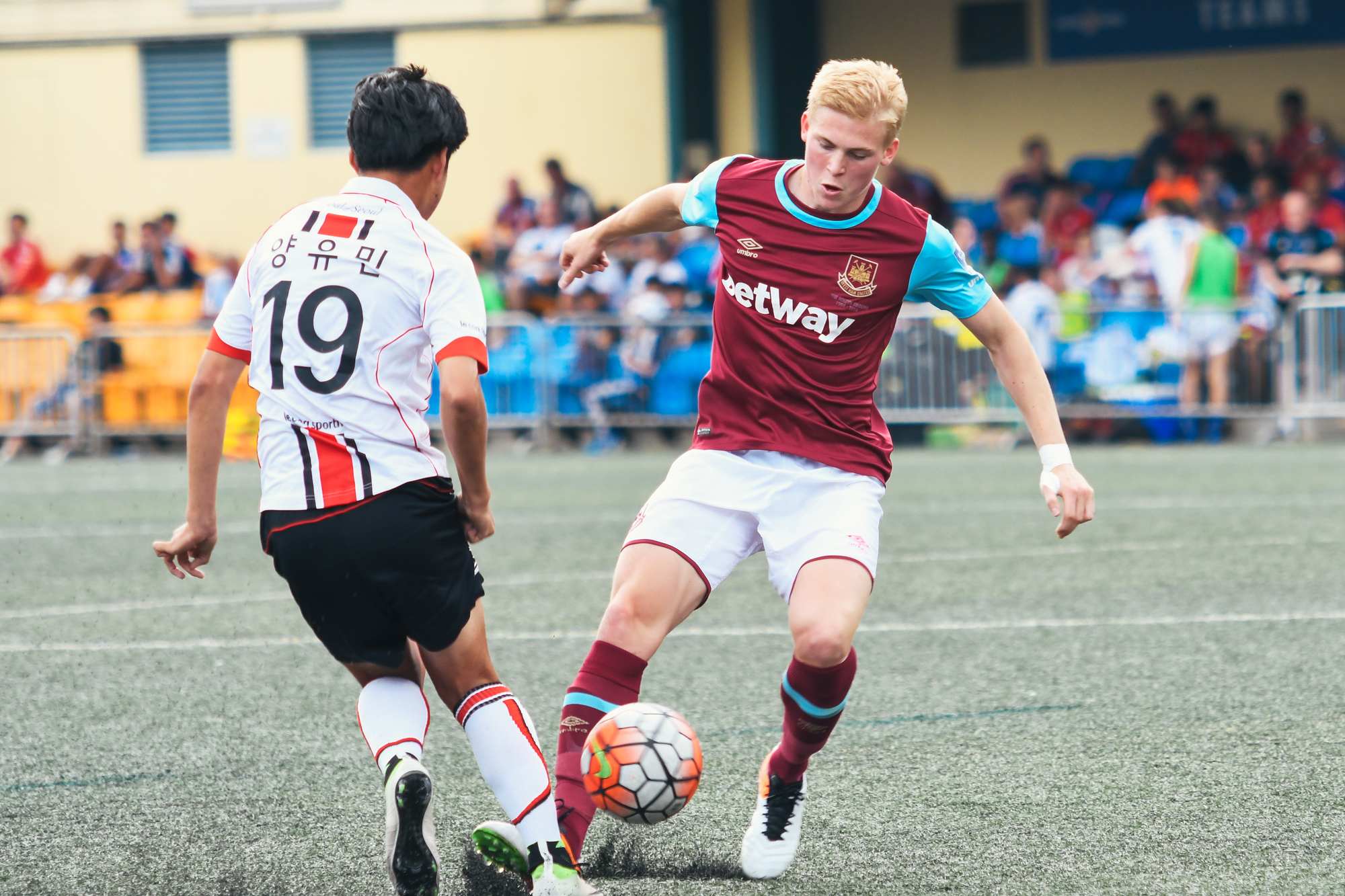

Personal information
- Full name: Alexander George Pike
- Date of birth: 8 February 1997 (age 29)
- Place of birth: Waltham Forest, England
- Position: Right-back

Youth career
- Buckhurst Hill
- 2008–2015: West Ham United

Senior career*
Years	Team	Apps	(Gls)
2015–2018	West Ham United	0	(0)
2017	→ Cheltenham Town (loan)	5	(0)
- * Club domestic league appearances and goals as of 03:34, 4 April 2018 (UTC)

Alexander George Pike (born 8 February 1997) is an English former footballer who played as a defender for West Ham United.

== Career ==
=== West Ham United ===
Pike joined West Ham United as an under-11 team player as a midfielder, joining from non-league side Buckhurst Hill, before converting to play as a right-back as a schoolboy. He was first included in a West Ham matchday squad for their UEFA Europa League second qualifying round first leg fixture away to Birkirkara of Malta on 16 July 2015, remaining an unused substitute in a 1–0 victory at the Boleyn Ground. With manager Slaven Bilić putting priority on the team's Premier League performance, he made an array of changes for their third qualifying round second leg away to FC Astra Giurgiu on 6 August, and Pike made his debut as an added-time substitute for Lewis Page in a 2–1 defeat which saw his team eliminated. In April 2018, after 11 years with the club, his contract was terminated by mutual consent.

=== Cheltenham Town loan ===
On 12 January 2017, Pike joined Cheltenham Town on loan for the rest of the season. Pike made his debut for Cheltenham Town on 14 January 2017 in a 3–0 home win against Accrington Stanley.

== Personal life ==
Following his release from West Ham, Pike quit football in favour of working in the City of London.

== Career statistics ==
Appearances and goals by club, season and competition
Club	Season	League			FA Cup		League Cup		Europe		Total	
Club	Season	Division	Apps	Goals	Apps	Goals	Apps	Goals	Apps	Goals	Apps	Goals
West Ham United	2015–16	Premier League	0	0	0	0	0	0	1	0	1	0
West Ham United	2016–17	Premier League	0	0	0	0	0	0	0	0	0	0
West Ham United	Total		0	0	0	0	0	0	1	0	1	0
Cheltenham Town (loan)	2016–17	League Two	5	0	0	0	0	0	0	0	0	0
Career total			5	0	0	0	0	0	1	0	6	0
