= Kyle Storer =

English footballer (born 1987)

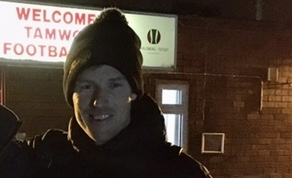
- Storer in January 2020

Personal information
- Full name: Kyle James Storer
- Date of birth: 30 April 1987 (age 39)
- Place of birth: Nuneaton, England
- Position: Midfielder

Team information
- Current team: Alvechurch (player-manager)

Youth career
- –2003: Leicester City

Senior career*
Years	Team	Apps	(Gls)
2003–2004	Bedworth United		
2004–2007	Tamworth	83	(3)
2005	→ Hinckley United (loan)	8	(1)
2007–2008	Hinckley United	25	(3)
2008	Atherstone Town	6	(4)
2008–2011	Nuneaton Town	111	(12)
2011–2015	Kidderminster Harriers	155	(13)
2015	Wrexham	13	(1)
2015–2018	Cheltenham Town	90	(3)
2018–2023	Solihull Moors	177	(3)
2023–2024	Nuneaton Borough	23	(3)
2024–2025	AFC Telford United	31	(2)
2025	Kettering Town	10	(0)
2025–	Alvechurch	0	(0)

Managerial career
- 2024: Nuneaton Borough (player-manager)
- 2025–: Alvechurch
- * Club domestic league appearances and goals as of 23:22, 14 June 2025 (UTC)

Kyle James Storer (born 30 April 1987) is an English footballer who plays as a midfielder for Southern League Premier Division Central club Alvechurch.

== Club career ==
In July 2015, Storer signed for National League club Cheltenham Town. In October 2016, he made his first League Two appearance for the club in a match against Crawley Town.

In January 2018, Storer left Cheltenham Town and signed for National League club Solihull Moors.

In November 2019 he made his 600th career appearance against Oxford City in the FA Cup

Storer departed Solihull Moors in January 2023 after five years with the club. On 9 January 2023, Storer rejoined Nuneaton Borough. In July 2023, Storer was promoted to the role of player/assistant manager.

In January 2024, he was promoted to manager of Nuneaton Borough, when Jimmy Ginnelly stepped down. Following the club's withdrawal from the league two weeks after his appointment, Storer joined AFC Telford United on 23 January 2024. On 14 February 2025, Storer departed Telford, joining Kettering Town. In June 2025, he joined Alvechurch.

== Career statistics ==
As of match played 26 December 2022

Club	Season	League			FA Cup		League Cup (Note: Includes Conference League Cup, EFL Cup)		Other		Total	
Club	Season	Division	Apps	Goals	Apps	Goals	Apps	Goals	Apps	Goals	Apps	Goals
Tamworth	2004–05	Conference National	27	1							27	1
Tamworth	2005–06	Conference National	27	1	5	1	—				32	2
Tamworth	2006–07	Conference National	29	1	3	1	—				32	2
Tamworth	Total		83	3	8	2					91	5
Hinckley United (loan)	2005–06	Conference North	8	1			—				8	1
Hinckley United	2007–08	Conference North	25	3							25	3
Hinckley United	Total		33	4							33	4
Nuneaton Town	2010–11	Conference North	37	12			—		2 (Note: Appearances in Conference play-offs)	1	39	13
Kidderminster Harriers	2011–12	Conference Premier	39	2	1	0	—		4 (Note: Appearance(s) in FA Trophy)	1	44	3
Kidderminster Harriers	2012–13	Conference Premier	36	2	2	0	—		3 (Note: One appearance in FA Trophy, two in Conference play-offs)	0	41	2
Kidderminster Harriers	2013–14	Conference Premier	35	6	7	0	—		0	0	42	6
Kidderminster Harriers	2014–15	Conference Premier	23	3	1	0	—		2	0	26	3
Kidderminster Harriers	Total		133	13	11	0	—		9	2	153	14
Wrexham	2014–15	Conference Premier	13	1	—		—		—		13	1
Cheltenham Town	2015–16	National League	46	3	3	0	—		0	0	49	3
Cheltenham Town	2016–17	League Two	23	0	2	0	0	0	0	0	25	0
Cheltenham Town	2017–18	League Two	21	0	1	0	2	0	3 (Note: Appearances in EFL Trophy)	1	27	1
Cheltenham Town	Total		90	3	6	0	2	0	3	1	101	4
Solihull Moors	2017–18	National League	16	1	—		—		1	0	17	1
Solihull Moors	2018–19	National League	42	2	4	0	—		3	0	49	2
Solihull Moors	2019–20	National League	35	0	3	0	—		2 (Note: One appearance in FA Trophy and one appearance in Scottish Challenge Cup)	40	0	
Solihull Moors	2020–21	National League	40	0	3	0	—		1	0	44	0
Solihull Moors	2021–22	National League	29	0	2	0	—		3 (Note: One appearance in FA Trophy, two appearances in National League play-offs)	0	34	0
Solihull Moors	2022–23	National League	13	0	3	0	—		1	0	17	0
Solihull Moors	Total		175	3	15	0	—		11	0	201	3
Career total			514	26	40	2	2	0	23	3	579	31

== Honours ==
Cheltenham Town

- National League: 2015–16

Individual

- National League Team of the Year: 2015–16
