= Billy Waters (footballer, born 1994) =

English footballer (born 1994)

Personal information
- Full name: Bill Henry Penna Waters
- Date of birth: 15 October 1994 (age 32)
- Place of birth: Epsom, England
- Height: 5 ft 6 in (1.67 m)
- Position: Forward

Team information
- Current team: Chester
- Number: 11

Youth career
- –2013: Crewe Alexandra

Senior career*
Years	Team	Apps	(Gls)
2013–2015	Crewe Alexandra	25	(2)
2015–2017	Cheltenham Town	83	(23)
2017–2020	Northampton Town	39	(2)
2018	→ Cambridge United (loan)	18	(2)
2019	→ Cheltenham Town (loan)	18	(4)
2020	→ Newport County (loan)	6	(0)
2020–2021	Torquay United	28	(6)
2021–2022	FC Halifax Town	44	(17)
2022–2023	Barrow	32	(9)
2023–2025	Wrexham	4	(0)
2024	→ Doncaster Rovers (loan)	11	(0)
2024–2025	→ FC Halifax Town (loan)	18	(5)
2025–2026	Oldham Athletic	13	(1)
2025-2026	→ Altrincham (loan)	1	(0)
2026	→ FC Halifax Town (loan)	1	(0)
2026-	Chester	13	(6)

International career
2022	England C	1	(0)
- * Club domestic league appearances and goals as of 11:00 28 October 2026 (UTC)

Bill Henry Penna Waters (born 15 October 1994) is an English professional footballer who plays as a forward for Chester.

A graduate of the Academy at Crewe Alexandra, he made his debut in the English Football League in November 2013. He was released by the club in May 2015, and moved on to Cheltenham Town, helping the team to win promotion as champions of the National League at the end of the 2015–16 season. He was named as Cheltenham Town Player of the Year in 2017, before he was sold on to Northampton Town in June 2017. He then had spells at Torquay United, FC Halifax Town and Barrow before joining Wrexham. He played just eight games for the Welsh side, being loaned out twice before joining Oldham in January 2025.

== Club career ==
=== Crewe Alexandra ===
Waters was born in Epsom and began his career with Crewe Alexandra. After progressing through the club's academy, he was called up to the first-team by manager Steve Davis in October 2012. Davis explained his decision to promote Waters to the first team, citing his impressive displays in the club's academy. He was an unused substitute five times throughout the 2012–13 season, before signing his first professional contract on a one-year deal in May 2013. Waters spent the first half of the 2013–14 season playing in the club's reserves. He made his professional debut on 26 November, in a 2–1 defeat at Carlisle United, entering the game as a 59th-minute substitute for Mark Ellis. He made his first start on 8 March, and provided an assist for Chuks Aneke, in a 4–2 defeat at Peterborough United. He signed a new two-year contract in June 2014.

Turning 20 early in the 2014–15 season, he stated that his aim was to establish himself in the first-team and he switched shirt number from 29 to 17. Waters made a perfect start to the campaign when he scored his first goal for the "Railwaymen" and set up another goal in a 2–0 win over Barnsley in the first round of the League Cup on 12 August. He scored against the same team four days later in a League One fixture at Gresty Road, though Crewe lost 2–1. His third goal came on 13 September, in a 1–1 draw at Yeovil Town. However he then suffered a dip in form and lost his place in the first-team, ending the campaign with three goals in 21 league and cup appearances, as loan signings Nicky Ajose, Uche Ikpeazu and Lauri Dalla Valle were all preferred. Despite having a year left on his contract, he was released by the club on 8 May 2015.

=== Cheltenham Town ===
On 29 June 2015, Waters joined Cheltenham Town on a one-year contract. He impressed in pre-season and scored a brace in a win against Bristol Rovers. He made his debut for the "Robins" on 8 August, in a 1–1 draw at Lincoln City. He scored his first goals on 12 September, in a 3–2 win over Dover Athletic at Whaddon Road. He then scored three goals in four games between 3 October and 13 October against FC Halifax Town, Braintree Town and Bromley. Later in the season, he scored braces against Guiseley, Southport and Chester. Cheltenham secured promotion as champions of the National League at the end of the season, marking an immediate return to the English Football League after relegation at the end of the 2014–15 season. The Gloucestershire Echo rated Waters 7 out of 10 for the 2015–16 season. He signed a contract extension with the club in May.

He scored 16 goals in 55 appearances as Cheltenham secured their League Two status with a 21st-place finish at the end of the 2016–17 campaign. Waters was voted as the club's Player of the Year and was also named as Players' Player and Young Player of the Year. He was offered a new contract by manager Gary Johnson but Waters rejected the offer in search of a new club.

=== Northampton Town ===
On 8 June 2017, Waters signed a three-year contract at Northampton Town after manager Justin Edinburgh authorised an undisclosed transfer fee to Cheltenham. However Edinburgh left Sixfields after the "Cobblers" lost the opening four games of the League One season, and his successor, Jimmy Floyd Hasselbaink played Waters out of position. On 12 January 2018, Waters joined League Two club Cambridge United on loan until the end of the 2017–18 season. Manager Shaun Derry had promised to play him in his natural position as a striker. Waters scored his first goal of the season on 17 February, in a 3–1 win over Grimsby Town at the Abbey Stadium, in what was caretaker-manager Joe Dunne's first win in charge. He scored his second goal for the "U's" on the final day of the season, a 5–0 home win over Port Vale, which coincidentally was Dunne's first game in charge following his appointment as the club's new permanent manager.

He was one of 3 transfer-listed by Northampton at the end of the 2018–19 season; a further 8 were released.

On 7 January 2020, Waters joined Newport County on loan until the end of the 2019–20 season. He made his debut for Newport County on 18 January 2020 in the 2–0 League Two win against Swindon Town as a second-half substitute.

He was released at the end of the season following the expiration of his contract.

=== Torquay United ===
He signed for National League side Torquay United in October 2020. He was released by the club on 23 June 2021.

=== FC Halifax Town ===
On 8 July 2021, Waters joined FC Halifax Town. He scored his first goal for the club on his debut, a 1–2 defeat to Maidenhead United on 21 August 2021.

=== Barrow ===
On 9 June 2022, Waters joined League Two side Barrow on a two-year deal. Waters was awarded the EFL League Two Player of the Month award for November 2022 having scored four goals in three matches, including a hat-trick in a 3–1 victory over Colchester United.

=== Wrexham ===
On 22 March 2023, Waters signed for Wrexham on a deal until the end of the 2024–25 season. In January 2024, he joined fellow League Two side Doncaster Rovers on loan until the end of the season. In August 2024, he rejoined Halifax on a loan until January 2025. He left Wrexham by mutual agreement in January 2025.

=== Oldham Athletic ===
On 16 January 2025, Waters joined National League side Oldham Athletic on an 18-month deal.

On 4 October 2025, Waters returned to the National League, joining Altrincham on loan until January 2026. In February 2026, he returned to Halifax on loan for the remainder of the season.

=== Chester FC ===
On 19 June 2026, Waters signed for Chester FC on a 2 year deal. He scored his first goal for the club on his debut in a 2-1 victory against Chorley on 8 August 2026.

== International career ==
Waters was placed on the stand-by list for Wales under-21s on two occasions, but did not receive a cap. In March 2016, Waters was called up to the England C squad.

== Personal life ==
In addition to football, Waters is also a talented singer.

== Career statistics ==
As of match played 17 February 2026

Appearances and goals by club, season and competition
Club	Season	League			FA Cup		League Cup		Other		Total	
Club	Season	Division	Apps	Goals	Apps	Goals	Apps	Goals	Apps	Goals	Apps	Goals
Crewe Alexandra	2013–14	League One	9	0	0	0	0	0	0	0	9	0
Crewe Alexandra	2014–15	League One	16	2	2	0	2	1	1 (Note: Appearance in Football League Trophy)	0	21	3
Crewe Alexandra	Total		25	2	2	0	2	1	1	0	30	3
Cheltenham Town	2015–16	National League	37	11	3	0	—		1 (Note: Appearance in FA Trophy)	0	41	11
Cheltenham Town	2016–17	League Two	46	12	3	2	2	0	4 (Note: Appearances in EFL Trophy)	2	55	16
Cheltenham Town	Total		83	23	6	2	2	0	5	2	96	27
Northampton Town	2017–18	League One	17	0	2	0	1	0	3	0	23	0
Northampton Town	2018–19	League Two	15	2	0	0	1	0	4	0	20	2
Northampton Town	2019–20	League Two	7	0	1	0	1	0	4	0	13	0
Northampton Town	Total		39	2	3	0	3	0	11	0	56	2
Cambridge United (loan)	2017–18	League Two	18	2	0	0	0	0	0	0	18	2
Cheltenham Town (loan)	2018–19	League Two	18	4	0	0	0	0	0	0	18	4
Newport County (loan)	2019–20	League Two	6	0	0	0	0	0	0	0	6	0
Torquay United	2020–21	National League	28	6	1	0	—		6 (Note: 4 appearances and 2 goals in FA Trophy, 2 appearances in National League play-offs)	2	35	8
FC Halifax Town	2021–22	National League	44	17	2	2	—		1	0	47	19
Barrow	2022–23	League Two	32	9	1	0	2	0	3	0	38	9
Wrexham	2022–23	National League	1	0	0	0	0	0	0	0	1	0
Wrexham	2023–24	League Two	3	0	0	0	1	0	3	0	7	0
Wrexham	2024–25	League One	0	0	0	0	0	0	0	0	0	0
Wrexham	Total		4	0	0	0	1	0	3	0	8	0
Doncaster Rovers (loan)	2023–24	League Two	11	0	0	0	0	0	0	0	11	0
FC Halifax Town (loan)	2024–25	National League	18	5	1	1	1	0	1	0	21	6
Oldham Athletic	2024–25	National League	13	2	0	0	0	0	0	0	13	2
Oldham Athletic	2025–26	League Two	0	0	0	0	0	0	1	0	1	0
Oldham Athletic	Total		13	2	0	0	0	0	1	0	14	2
Altrincham (loan)	2025–26	National League	1	0	0	0	0	0	0	0	1	0
FC Halifax Town (loan)	2025–26	National League	1	0	0	0	0	0	0	0	1	0
Career total			321	65	16	5	11	1	31	4	355	76

== Honours ==
Cheltenham Town

- National League: 2015–16

Wrexham

- National League: 2022-23
- EFL League Two runner-up: 2023-24

Oldham Athletic

- National League play-ffs: 2024-25

Individual

- Cheltenham Town Player of the Year: 2016–17
- EFL League Two Player of the Month: November 2022
