= 2016–17 Cheltenham Town F.C. season =

Cheltenham Town
2016–17 season
- Chairman: Paul Baker
- Manager: Gary Johnson
- Stadium: Whaddon Road
- League Two: 21st
- FA Cup: Second round
- League Cup: Second round
- Football League Trophy: Third round
Home colours	Away colours

The 2016–17 season was Cheltenham Town's 130th season of existence and their first back in League Two after gaining promotion the previous season. Along with competing in League Two, the club participated in the FA Cup, League Cup and Football League Trophy.

The season covered the period from 1 July 2016 to 30 June 2017.

== Transfers ==
=== In ===
Date from	Position	Nationality	Name	From	Fee	Ref.
1 July 2016	LB	ENG	James Jennings	Forest Green Rovers	Free transfer	
12 July 2016	CB	FIN	Daniel O'Shaughnessy	Brentford	Free transfer	
8 October 2016	LM	SCO	Alex Cooper	St Mirren	Free transfer	
9 January 2017	CB	SCO	Will Boyle	Huddersfield Town	Free transfer	
12 January 2017	RM	NIR	Carl Winchester	Oldham Athletic	Free transfer	
30 January 2017	LB	ENG	Liam Davis	GAIS	Free transfer	

=== Out ===
Date from	Position	Nationality	Name	To	Fee	Ref.
1 July 2016	LB	ENG	James Bowen	Free agent	Released	
1 July 2016	CF	ENG	Bobbie Dale	Gloucester City (Note: Following Bobbie Dale being released, he later signed for Gloucester City.)	Released	
1 July 2016	CM	ENG	Joe Hanks	Gloucester City (Note: Following Joe Hanks being released, he later signed for Gloucester City.)	Released	
1 July 2016	LM	ENG	Zack Kotwica	Gloucester City (Note: Following Zack Kotwica being released, he later signed for Gloucester City.)	Released	
1 July 2016	LB	SCO	George McLennan	Free agent	Released	
1 July 2016	CF	WAL	Eliot Richards	Tampa Bay Rowdies	Undisclosed	
1 July 2016	CB	ENG	Niall Rowe	Free agent	Released	
1 July 2016	CM	ENG	Omari Sterling-James	Solihull Moors (Note: Following Omari Sterling-James being released, he later signed for Solihull Moors.)	Released	
1 July 2016	DM	ENG	Jordan Wynter	Free agent	Released	

=== Loans in ===
Date from	Position	Nationality	Name	From	Date until	Ref.
22 July 2016	CM	ENG	Danny Whitehead	Wigan Athletic	1 January 2017 (Note: On 1 January 2017, Danny Whitehead's loan was terminated by mutual consent.)	
4 August 2016	CB	ENG	Easah Suliman	Aston Villa	3 January 2017	
5 August 2016	GK	ENG	Russell Griffiths	Everton	2 January 2017	
19 August 2016	AM	GHA	Koby Arthur	Birmingham City	2 January 2017	
19 August 2016	LW	WAL	Jonny Smith	Bristol City	2 January 2017	
25 August 2016	RB	ENG	Robert Dickie	Reading	2 January 2017	
1 January 2017	SS	ITA	Diego De Girolamo	Bristol City	End of season	
1 January 2017	CB	NGA	Manny Onariase	Brentford	End of season	
9 January 2017	GK	ENG	Scott Brown	Wycombe Wanderers	End of season	
12 January 2017	RB	ENG	Alex Pike	West Ham United	End of season	
25 January 2017	CF	ENG	Kyle Wootton	Scunthorpe United	End of season	
31 January 2017	DM	CRO	Tin Plavotic	Bristol City	End of season	

=== Loans out ===
Date from	Position	Nationality	Name	To	Date until	Ref.
31 August 2016	LB	ENG	James Jennings	Morecambe	3 January 2017	
6 January 2017	LB	ENG	James Jennings	Wrexham	End of season	
6 January 2017	DF	ENG	Jordan Lymn	North Leigh	3 February 2017	
12 January 2017	CF	ENG	Amari Morgan-Smith	York City	End of season	
12 January 2017	CB	WAL	Daniel Parslow	York City	End of season	

== Competitions ==
=== Pre-season friendlies ===
14 July 2016 Friendly	Cirencester Town	0–3	Cheltenham Town	Cirencester
19:45			Holman 1', 10'; Thomas 85'	Stadium: Corinium Stadium

19 July 2016 Friendly	Cheltenham Town	1–3	Barnsley	Cheltenham
19:45	Holman 83'	Report	Winnall 36', 45'; Tuton 85'	Stadium: Whaddon Road

25 July 2016 Friendly	Cheltenham Town	1–2	Bristol City	Cheltenham
19:45	Wright 87'	Report	Kodjia 9'; Tomlin 63'	Stadium: Whaddon Road

=== League Two ===
==== League table ====
Pos	Team	Pld	W	D	L	GF	GA	GD	Pts	Promotion, qualification or relegation
19	Crawley Town	46	13	12	21	53	71	−18	51	
20	Yeovil Town	46	11	17	18	49	64	−15	50	
21	Cheltenham Town	46	12	14	20	49	69	−20	50	
22	Newport County	46	12	12	22	51	73	−22	48	
23	Hartlepool United (R)	46	11	13	22	54	75	−21	46	Relegation to the National League

Updated to match(es) played on 6 May 2017. Source: BBC Sport
Rules for classification: 1) Points; 2) Goal difference; 3) Number of goals scored
(R) Relegated

==== Matches ====
6 August 2016 1	Cheltenham Town	1–1	Leyton Orient	Cheltenham
15:00 BST	Suliman (yellow card) 36'; Waters 76'	Report	Massey 3'; Atangana (yellow card) 55'; Cornick (yellow card) 90+6'	Stadium: Whaddon Road; Attendance: 3,912; Referee: Lee Probert

13 August 2016 2	Mansfield Town	1–1	Cheltenham Town	Mansfield
15:00 BST	Rose 49' (yellow card) 63'; Clements (yellow card) 89'		O'Shaughnessy 79'	Stadium: Field Mill; Attendance: 2,884

16 August 2016 3	Carlisle United	1–1	Cheltenham Town	Carlisle
19:45 BST	Grainger (yellow card) 71'; Kennedy 89'	Report	Pell 57' (yellow card) 85'; Suliman (yellow card) 64'; Waters (yellow card) 72'	Stadium: Brunton Park; Attendance: 4,203; Referee: Michael Salisbury

20 August 2016 4	Cheltenham Town	0–1	Doncaster Rovers	Cheltenham
15:00 BST	Suliman (yellow card) 18'; Jennings (yellow card) 81'	Report	Marquis 53'; Maroši (yellow card) 57'; Houghton (yellow card) 79'	Stadium: Whaddon Road; Attendance: 2,923 (367 from Doncaster); Referee: Mark Heywood

27 August 2016 5	Cheltenham Town	2–0	Crewe Alexandra	Cheltenham
15:00 BST	Dickie 16'; Dayton 22'; Cranston (yellow card) 90+3'	Report		Stadium: Whaddon Road; Attendance: 2,623; Referee: Brett Huxtable

3 September 2016 6	Plymouth Argyle	1–0	Cheltenham Town	Plymouth
15:00 BST	Garita (yellow card) 55'; Bradley 90+2'	Report	Hall (yellow card) 37'; Wright (yellow card) 45+3'; Rowe (yellow card) 72'	Stadium: Home Park; Attendance: 7,552; Referee: Nicholas Kinseley

10 September 2016 7	Newport County	2–2	Cheltenham Town	Newport
15:00 BST	Parkin 18', 37'; Bignot (yellow card) 34'	Report	Hall 11'; Wright 34' (pen.)	Stadium: Rodney Parade; Attendance: 2,656; Referee: Carl Boyeson

17 September 2016 8	Cheltenham Town	2–3	Notts County	Cheltenham
15:00 BST	Wright (yellow card) 14' (goal) 24'; Pell (yellow card) 20' (goal) 55'	Report	Forte 4' (yellow card) 67'; Dickinson (yellow card) 16'; Milsom (yellow card) 21'; Stead 41', 56'	Stadium: LCI Rail Stadium; Attendance: 3,067; Referee: John Brooks

24 September 2016 9	Yeovil Town	4–2	Cheltenham Town	Yeovil
15:00 BST	Khan 6'; Ward 16'; Dolan 45+1' (yellow card) 73'; Butcher (yellow card) 78'; Eaves 90'; Shephard (yellow card) 90+3'	Report	Downes 41'; Waters 57'; Wright (penalty missed) (yellow card) 90+2'; Pell (yellow card) 90+2'	Stadium: Huish Park Stadium; Attendance: 3,448; Referee: Graham Salisbury

27 September 2016 10	Cheltenham Town	0–0	Stevenage	Cheltenham
19:45 BST	Dickie (yellow card) 34'; Wright (yellow card) 36'; Waters (yellow card) 90+2'	Report	King (yellow card) 76'; Gorman (yellow card) 78'	Stadium: LCI Rail Stadium; Attendance: 2,238; Referee: Robert Jones

1 October 2016 11	Cheltenham Town	1–1	Luton Town	Cheltenham
15:00 BST	Waters (yellow card) 56'; O'Shaughnessy 64'; Downes (yellow card) 77'; Pell (yellow card) 82'	Report	Cuthbert (yellow card) 43'; Hylton 52'	Stadium: LCI Rail Stadium; Attendance: 3,660; Referee: Trevor Kettle

8 October 2016 12	Accrington Stanley	1–1	Cheltenham Town	Accrington
15:00 BST	Gornell 74'	Report	Pell (yellow card) 16'; Dickie (yellow card) 16' (goal) 89'; O'Shaughnessy (yellow card) 23' (yellow-red card) 66'	Stadium: Wham Stadium; Attendance: 1,637; Referee: Nigel Miller

15 October 2016 13	Cheltenham Town	2–1	Crawley Town	Cheltenham
15:00 BST	Waters 3'; Cranston (yellow card) 45'; Munns 62'; Wright (yellow card) 79'; Dayton (yellow card) 85'	Report	McNerney (yellow card) 48'; Young (yellow card) 73'; Kaby Djaló 78'; Tajbakhsh (yellow card) 81'; Boldewijn (yellow card) 86'	Stadium: LCI Rail Stadium; Attendance: 2,678; Referee: Graham Horwood

22 October 2016 14	Grimsby Town	0–1	Cheltenham Town	Cleethorpes
15:00 BST	Andrew (yellow card) 71'	Report	Waters 9'; Pell (yellow card) 70'; Munns (yellow card) 80'; Dayton (yellow card) 85'	Stadium: Blundell Park; Attendance: 4,809; Referee: Darren Deadman

29 October 2016 15	Cheltenham Town	2–2	Blackpool	Cheltenham
15:00 BST	Dickie (yellow card) 9'; Dayton 18'; Downes (yellow card) 34'; Storer (yellow card) 43'; Wright 45+3'; Cranston (yellow card) 53'; Pell (yellow card) 75'	Report	Slocombe (yellow card) 16'; Vassell 45', 47'; Payne (yellow card) 45+3'; Aldred (yellow card) 90+5'	Stadium: LCI Rail Stadium; Attendance: 3,162; Referee: Gavin Ward

12 November 2016 16	Hartlepool United	2–0	Cheltenham Town	Hartlepool
15:00 GMT	Alessandra 45+6'; Bates 79'	Report	Cranston (yellow card) 71'; Downes (yellow card) 79'	Stadium: The Northern Gas and Power Stadium; Attendance: 3,316; Referee: Graham Salisbury

19 November 2016 17	Cheltenham Town	1–1	Portsmouth	Cheltenham
15:00 GMT	Pell (yellow card) 7'; Downes (yellow card) 11'; O'Shaughnessy 65'	Report	Chaplin (yellow card) 52'; Burgess (yellow card) 64'; Baker (yellow card) 78'; Smith 82'	Stadium: LCI Rail Stadium; Attendance: 4,702; Referee: John Brooks

22 November 2016 18	Cheltenham Town	0–3	Colchester United	Cheltenham
19:45 GMT	Pell (yellow card) 42' (yellow-red card) 87'; Cranston (yellow card) 81'	Report	Elokobi (yellow card) 26'; Slater 48'; Dickenson 65'; Eastman 68'	Stadium: LCI Rail Stadium; Attendance: 2,276; Referee: Mark Haywood

26 November 2016 19	Cambridge United	3–1	Cheltenham Town	Cambridge
15:00 GMT	Ikpeazu 7' (yellow card) 62'; Berry 56', 74'	Report	Parslow (yellow card) 32'; Wright (yellow card) 63'; Dayton (yellow card) 64'; Waters 85'	Stadium: The R Costings Abbey Stadium; Attendance: 4,606; Referee: Ross Joyce

10 December 2016 20	Cheltenham Town	1–3	Exeter City	Cheltenham
15:00 GMT	Waters 70'; Dickie (yellow card) 72'; Storer (yellow card) 83'	Report	Watkins (yellow card) 13'; Holmes 55'; Woodman (yellow card) 66'; Wheeler 81', 85' (yellow card) 82'; Ampdau (yellow card) 90+1'	Stadium: LCI Rail Stadium; Attendance: 3,113; Referee: Darren England

17 December 2016 21	Morecambe	1–2	Cheltenham Town	Morecambe
15:00 GMT	Murphy 6'; Kenyon (red card) 39'; Mullin (yellow card) 53'	Report	Cranston (yellow card) 53'; Waters 70'; Pell 71'	Stadium: Globe Arena; Attendance: 1,297; Referee: Michael Salisbury

26 December 2016 22	Cheltenham Town	1–2	Barnet	Cheltenham
15:00 GMT	Wright 44'; Downes (yellow card) 54'; Cranston (yellow card) 67'; Waters (yellow card) 74'; Pell (yellow card) 90+1'	Report	Weston 8'; Johnson (yellow card) 50'; Akinde 51'; Campbell-Ryce (yellow card) 89'	Stadium: LCI Rail Stadium; Attendance: 3,441; Referee: John Busby

30 December 2016 23	Cheltenham Town	0–1	Wycombe Wanderers	Cheltenham
19:45 GMT	Storer (yellow card) 17'	Report	Kashket 9' (yellow card) 38'; Jacobson (yellow card) 90'	Stadium: LCI Rail Stadium; Attendance: 3,761; Referee: Kevin Johnson

2 January 2017 24	Colchester United	2–0	Cheltenham Town	Colchester
15:00 GMT	Eastman 10'; Lapslie (yellow card) 38'; Dickenson 84'	Report	Dickie (yellow card) 29'; Pell (yellow card) 37'	Stadium: Weston Homes Community Stadium; Attendance: 3,840; Referee: Dean Whitestone

14 January 2017 25	Cheltenham Town	3–0	Accrington Stanley	Cheltenham
15:00 GMT	Winchester (yellow card) 52'; Wright 55'; De Girolamo 74'; Waters 78'	Report	Brown (red card) 62'; Donacien (yellow card) 90'; Gornell (yellow card) 90+3'	Stadium: LCI Rail Stadium; Attendance: 2,854; Referee: Lee Swabey

21 January 2017 26	Cheltenham Town	1–2	Plymouth Argyle	Cheltenham
15:00 GMT	Boyle (yellow card) 67'; Holman 85'; Rowe (yellow card) 88'	Report	Bradley 26', 90+1'; Threlkeld (yellow card) 83'; Tanner (yellow card) 90+5'	Stadium: LCI Rail Stadium; Attendance: 4,729; Referee: Ross Joyce

28 January 2017 27	Crewe Alexandra	0–0	Cheltenham Town	Crewe
15:00 GMT		Report	Wright (yellow card) 45'	Stadium: Alexandra Stadium; Attendance: 3,373; Referee: Darren Handley

31 January 2017 28	Luton Town	2–3	Cheltenham Town	Luton
19:45 GMT	Vassell 41'; Davis 72' (o.g.); Justin (yellow card) 90+3'	Report	Boyle 5' (yellow card) 71'; Barthram 28'; Wootton (yellow card) 34'; Waters 60'	Stadium: Kenilworth Road; Attendance: 6,708; Referee: John Busby

4 February 2017 29	Cheltenham Town	1–1	Newport County	Cheltenham
15:00 GMT	Wootton 62'	Report	Gordon 90+3'	Stadium: Whaddon Road; Attendance: 3,763; Referee: Chris Sarginson

11 February 2017 30	Notts County	2–1	Cheltenham Town	Nottingham
15:00 GMT	Yeates (yellow card) 15'; Stead 24'; Duffy 33'; O'Connor (yellow card) 61'	Report	Onariase 87' (yellow card) 90+5'	Stadium: Meadow Lane; Attendance: 7,910; Referee: Michael Salisbury

14 February 2017 31	Stevenage	2–1	Cheltenham Town	Stevenage
19:45 GMT	Godden 18' (pen.) (yellow card) 27'; Lee (yellow card) 44' (yellow-red card) 56'; Wilkinson 50'; Kennedy (yellow card) 63'; Jones (yellow card) 82'	Report	Cranston (yellow card) 19'; Boyle (yellow card) 50'; Pell (yellow card) 82'; Wootton 82'	Stadium: Lamex Stadium; Attendance: 1,930; Referee: Trevor Kettle

18 February 2017 32	Cheltenham Town	2–0	Yeovil Town	Cheltenham
15:00 GMT	Plavotic 48'; Pell (yellow card) 56'; Waters (yellow card) 58' (goal) 63' (pen.); Brown (yellow card) 89'	Report	Eaves (yellow card) 41'; Ward (yellow card) 57'; Butcher (yellow card) 74'; Zoko (yellow card) 88'	Stadium: LCI Rail Stadium; Attendance: 3,347; Referee: Darren England

25 February 2017 33	Leyton Orient	0-1	Cheltenham Town	Leyton
15:00 GMT	Massey (yellow card) 90'	Report	Winchester 21'; Rowe (yellow card) 40'	Stadium: Brisbane Road; Attendance: 4,747; Referee: Nigel Miller

28 February 2017 34	Cheltenham Town	1–0	Carlisle United	Cheltenham
19:45 GMT	Boyle (yellow card) 39'; Wright 85'; Onariase (yellow card) 87'	Report	Proctor (yellow card) 90+1'	Stadium: Whaddon Road; Attendance: 2,433; Referee: Andy Haines

4 March 2017 35	Cheltenham Town	0–0	Mansfield Town	Cheltenham
15:00 GMT	Storer (red card) 18'; Barthram (yellow card) 54'; Davis (yellow card) 60'	Report	Hoban (yellow card) 45+1'; Bennett (yellow card) 90+4'	Stadium: Whaddon Road; Attendance: 2,941; Referee: Charles Breakspear

11 March 2017 36	Doncaster Rovers	2–0	Cheltenham Town	Doncaster
15:00 GMT	Butler 23'; Blair (yellow card) 53'; Marquis 81'	Report	Boyle (red card) 26'	Stadium: Keepmoat Stadium; Attendance: 5,737; Referee: Kevin Johnson

14 March 2017 37	Exeter City	3–0	Cheltenham Town	Exeter
19:45 GMT	Reid 43' (pen.), 51'; Taylor 57'; Woodman (yellow card) 79'; Watkins (yellow card) 90'	Report	Onariase (yellow card) 18'; Winchester (yellow card) 38'; Cranston (yellow card) 90'	Stadium: St James Park; Attendance: 3,539; Referee: Brett Huxtable

18 March 2017 38	Cheltenham Town	0–1	Cambridge United	Cheltenham
15:00 GMT		Report	Elito 2'; Wharton (yellow card) 18'; Berry (yellow card) 90'	Stadium: Whaddon Road; Attendance: 2,905; Referee: Michael Salisbury

25 March 2017 39	Barnet	3–1	Cheltenham Town	Canons Park, London
15:00 GMT	Tutonda (yellow card) 50'; Weston 70'; Akinde 77', 79'	Report	Wright 16'; Winchester (yellow card) 62'	Stadium: The Hive Stadium; Attendance: 1,861; Referee: Chris Sarginson

1 April 2017 40	Cheltenham Town	3-1	Morecambe	Cheltenham
15:00 BST		Report		Stadium: Whaddon Road; Attendance: 2,751; Referee: Gavin Ward

8 April 2017 41	Wycombe Wanderers	3–3	Cheltenham Town	High Wycombe
15:00 BST				Stadium: Adams Park; Attendance: 3,596

14 April 2017 42	Crawley Town	0-0	Cheltenham Town	Crawley
15:00 BST				Stadium: Broadfield Stadium; Attendance: 2,008

17 April 2017 43	Cheltenham Town	2–1	Grimsby Town	Cheltenham
13:00 BST	Boyle 34'; Pell 39'	Report	Berrett 73'	Stadium: Whaddon Road; Attendance: 3,550; Referee: Mark Heywood

22 April 2017 44	Blackpool	3-0	Cheltenham Town	Blackpool
15:00 BST				Stadium: Bloomfield Road; Attendance: 3,775

29 April 2017 45	Cheltenham Town	1-0	Hartlepool United	Cheltenham
15:00 BST				Stadium: Whaddon Road; Attendance: 5,606

6 May 2017 46	Portsmouth	6–1	Cheltenham Town	Portsmouth
17:30 BST	O'Shaughnessy 13' (o.g.); Stevens (yellow card) 52'; Bennett 62'; Naismith 66', 85'; Lowe 72'; Evans 75' (pen.)	Report	Storer (yellow card) 29'; Dayton 78'	Stadium: Fratton Park; Attendance: 17,956; Referee: Chris Sarginson

=== FA Cup ===
5 November 2016 First round	Cheltenham Town	1–1	Crewe Alexandra	Cheltenham
15:00 GMT	Storer (red card) 37'; Waters 58'; Cranston (yellow card) 86'	Report	Davis (yellow card) 6'; Jones 73'	Stadium: LCI Rail Stadium; Attendance: 2,880; Referee: Michael Salisbury

15 November 2016 First round replay	Crewe Alexandra	1–4	Cheltenham Town	Crewe
19:45 GMT	Lowe 64'	Report	Pell 19'; Bartham 36'; Dickie (yellow card) 47'; Waters 52'; Holman 61'	Stadium: Alexandra Stadium; Attendance: 1,711; Referee: Seb Stockbridge

3 December 2016 Second round	Sutton United	2–1	Cheltenham Town	Sutton
15:00 GMT	Tubbs 46'; Deacon (yellow card) 59' (goal) 90+6'; Downer (yellow card) 78'; Bailey (yellow card) 89'; Spence (yellow card) 90+4'	Report	Wright 35'; Cranston (yellow card) 44'; Shaughnessy (yellow card) 60'	Stadium: The Borough Sports Ground; Attendance: 2,224; Referee: Rob Jones

=== EFL Cup ===
9 August 2016 First round	Cheltenham Town	1–0	Charlton Athletic	Cheltenham
19:45 BST	Pell 17'; Holman (yellow card) 61'; Jennings (yellow card) 90+1'	Report	Fox (yellow card) 76'; Crofts (yellow card) 90+4'; Jackson (yellow card) 90+5'	Stadium: Whaddon Road; Attendance: 2,106; Referee: Brendan Malone

23 August 2016 Second round	Newcastle United	2–0	Cheltenham Town	Newcastle upon Tyne
19:45 BST	Pérez 45+2', 47'	Report	Rowe (yellow card) 51'	Stadium: St James' Park; Attendance: 21,972; Referee: Stephen Martin

=== EFL Trophy ===
Pos	Div	Team	Pld	W	PW	PL	L	GF	GA	GD	Pts	Qualification
1	L2	Cheltenham Town	3	2	0	0	1	4	3	+1	6	Advance to Round 2
2	L2	Blackpool	3	1	1	0	1	3	3	0	5	Advance to Round 2
3	ACA	Everton U21	3	1	0	1	1	4	3	+1	4	
4	L1	Bolton Wanderers	3	1	0	0	2	1	3	−2	3	

Source: Sky Sports

30 August 2016 Group stage 1	Blackpool	2–1	Cheltenham Town	Blackpool
19:45 BST	Higham (yellow card) 38'; Vassell 56', 58'		Smith (yellow card) 11'; Jennings 20'; Arthur (yellow card) 81'	Stadium: Bloomfield Road

4 October 2016 Group stage 2	Cheltenham Town	2–1	Everton U23	Cheltenham
19:30 BST	Waters 82'; Wright 83' (pen.)	Report	Kitscha 5' (o.g.)	Stadium: LCI Rail Stadium; Attendance: 1,023; Referee: Lee Probert

8 November 2016 Group stage 3	Cheltenham Town	1–0	Bolton Wanderers	Cheltenham
19:45 GMT	Pell (yellow card) 65'; Morgan-Smith 90+1' (pen.)	Report	Alnwick (yellow card) 90+1'	Stadium: LCI Rail Stadium; Attendance: 1,038; Referee: Kevin Friend

10 January 2017 Second round	Cheltenham Town	6–1	Leicester City U23	Cheltenham
19:45 GMT	De Girolamo 8', 36', 87'; O'Shaughnessy 31'; Pell 65'; Morgan-Smith 80'	Report	Kapustka 12'; Johnson (yellow card) 67'	Stadium: LCI Rail Stadium; Attendance: 1,028; Referee: Brett Huxtable

17 January 2017 Third round	Cheltenham Town	0–1	Bradford City	Cheltenham
19:45 GMT	Rowe (yellow card) 90+2'	Report	Hiwula-Mayifuila 64'; McMahon (yellow card) 80'	Stadium: LCI Rail Stadium; Attendance: 1,081; Referee: Brendan Malone

== Squad statistics ==
Numbers in parentheses denote appearances as substitute.
Players with squad numbers struck through and marked † left the club during the playing season.
Players with names in italics and marked * were on loan from another club for the whole of their season with Cheltenham.
Players listed with no appearances have been in the matchday squad but only as unused substitutes.
Key to positions: GK – Goalkeeper; DF – Defender; MF – Midfielder; FW – Forward

No.	Pos.	Nat.	Name	Apps	Goals	Apps	Goals	Apps	Goals	Apps	Goals	Apps	Goals	Yellow card	Red card
No.	Pos.	Nat.	Name	League		FA Cup		EFL Cup		EFL Trophy		Total		Discipline	
~~1~~ †	GK	ENG	Russell Griffiths *	24	0	3	0	2	0	0	0	29	0	0	0
1	GK	ENG	Scott Brown *	21	0	0	0	0	0	0	0	21	0	2	0
2	DF	ENG	Jack Barthram	22 (7)	1	2	1	0 (1)	0	4	0	28 (8)	2	1	0
3	DF	ENG	James Jennings	2 (1)	0	0	0	0 (1)	0	1	1	3 (2)	0	2	0
4	MF	ENG	Kyle Storer	18 (5)	0	2	0	0	0	0	0	20 (5)	0	4	2
5	DF	AUS	Aaron Downes	15 (5)	1	2	0	0	0	1	0	18 (5)	1	6	0
6	DF	ENG	Daniel Parslow	19 (2)	0	3	0	2	0	3	0	27 (2)	0	1	0
7	MF	ENG	Harry Pell	42	7	3	1	2	1	4 (1)	0	51 (1)	9	16	1
8	FW	ENG	Billy Waters	41 (5)	12	3	2	2	0	4	2	50 (5)	16	5	0
9	FW	ENG	Daniel Wright	34 (7)	9	3	1	2	0	3 (2)	1	42 (9)	11	10	0
10	FW	ENG	Amari Morgan-Smith	4 (13)	0	0 (2)	0	1 (1)	0	2 (2)	2	7 (18)	2	1	0
11	MF	ENG	Jack Munns	8 (10)	1	1 (2)	0	0	0	2 (2)	0	11 (14)	1	2	0
12	GK	ENG	Calum Kitscha	0	0	0	0	0	0	5	0	5	0	0	0
14	MF	ENG	Asa Hall	8 (2)	1	0	0	1	0	1 (1)	0	10 (3)	1	1	0
~~15~~ †	MF	GHA	Koby Arthur *	1 (4)	0	0	0	0 (1)	0	1	0	2 (5)	0	1	0
15	DF	ENG	Will Boyle	21	2	0	0	0	0	2	0	23	2	7	1
17	DF	WAL	Jordan Cranston	30 (8)	0	2	0	2	0	4	0	38 (8)	0	13	1
18	MF	ENG	James Rowe	26 (6)	0	0 (1)	0	1 (1)	0	2 (1)	0	29 (9)	0	5	0
~~19~~ †	MF	SCO	Alex Cooper	1	0	0	0	0	0	0	0	1	0	0	0
19	FW	ENG	Kyle Wootton *	10 (6)	2	0	0	0	0	0	0	10 (6)	2	1	0
20	DF	ENG	Jordan Lymn	0	0	0	0	0	0	0	0	0	0	0	0
21	MF	ENG	James Dayton	10 (18)	3	3	0	1	0	2 (2)	0	16 (20)	3	4	0
22	GK	ENG	Rhys Lovett	0	0	0	0	0	0	0	0	0	0	0	0
~~23~~ †	MF	ENG	Danny Whitehead *	5 (1)	0	0 (1)	0	1	0	1 (1)	0	7 (3)	0	0	0
23	DF	ENG	Manny Onariase *	22	1	0	0	0	0	2	0	24	1	3	0
24	DF	FIN	Daniel O'Shaughnessy	26 (1)	3	2	0	2	0	4 (1)	1	34 (2)	4	3	1
25	DF	ENG	Matt Bower	0	0	0	0	0	0	0	0	0	0	0	0
~~26~~ †	DF	ENG	Easah Suliman *	5 (4)	0	0 (1)	0	2	0	0	0	7 (5)	0	3	0
26	DF	ENG	Alex Pike *	5	0	0	0	0	0	0	0	5	0	0	0
~~27~~ †	MF	ENG	Jonny Smith *	2 (3)	0	0 (1)	0	0 (1)	0	2	0	4 (5)	0	1	0
27	MF	NIR	Carl Winchester	20	1	0	0	0	0	0	0	20	1	3	0
~~28~~ †	DF	ENG	Robert Dickie *	20	2	3	0	0	0	3	0	26	2	4	0
29	MF	ENG	Josh Thomas	0	0	0	0	0	0	0	0	0	0	0	0
30	FW	ENG	Dan Holman	16 (8)	1	1	1	1	0	0 (2)	0	18 (10)	2	3	0
31	GK	ENG	Lewis Clayton	0	0	0	0	0	0	0	0	0	0	0	0
32	DF	CRO	Tin Plavotic *	10 (1)	1	0	0	0	0	0	0	10 (1)	1	0	0
33	DF	ENG	Liam Davis	13 (3)	0	0	0	0	0	0	0	13 (3)	0	2	0
~~34~~ †	GK	ENG	Rob Lainton *	1	0	0	0	0	0	0	0	1	0	0	0
36	FW	ITA	Diego De Girolamo *	4 (1)	1	0	0	0	0	2	3	6 (1)	4	0	0
