= Danny Wright (footballer) =

English footballer

Personal information
- Full name: Daniel Paul Wright
- Date of birth: 10 September 1984 (age 42)
- Place of birth: Norwich, England
- Position: Forward

Team information
- Current team: Gloucester City

Senior career*
Years	Team	Apps	(Gls)
2007–2010	Histon	103	(33)
2010–2011	Cambridge United	44	(10)
2011–2013	Wrexham	73	(21)
2013–2014	Forest Green Rovers	40	(8)
2014–2015	Gateshead	20	(7)
2015	Kidderminister Harriers	16	(4)
2015–2018	Cheltenham Town	117	(34)
2018–2020	Solihull Moors	72	(16)
2020–2022	Torquay United	52	(14)
2022–2023	Havant & Waterlooville	38	(7)
2023–2024	Gloucester City	12	(1)
- * Club domestic league appearances and goals

Daniel Paul Wright (born 10 September 1984) is an English retired footballer who plays as a forward for Gloucester City. He operates in the target man role, using his height to his advantage.

He has played ten seasons in the National League in service of eight clubs, totalling over 100 goals across more than 300 games. He added 74 games and 12 goals in EFL League Two for Cheltenham Town, already in his 30s.

In his career he won the Conference South with Histon in 2007, the FA Trophy with Wrexham in 2013 and the National League for Cheltenham in 2016.

== Career ==
=== Histon ===
Born in Norwich, Norfolk, Wright began his career at nearby Dereham Town of the Eastern Counties Football League. He transferred on deadline day to Histon, and helped them win the Conference South title in 2006–07. After the title had already been sealed, he scored and assisted as they won 2–1 against Sutton United. The Cambridge News wrote:

Although a bit rough around the edges, the striker showed why Histon were prepared to take a gamble on him. He showed strength both on and off the ball, a maturity beyond his years and a deceptive turn of pace to cause the Sutton defence problems all night.

On 8 November 2008, Wright scored the only goal as Histon beat Swindon Town of Football League One in "one of the shocks of the FA Cup first round". He was sent off on 4 April in a 2–1 loss at Oxford United for elbowing their goalkeeper Billy Turley; Histon were leading at that point.

Wright's final season at Histon began on 8 August 2009 with two goals in a 3–0 win at newcomers Gateshead. In his penultimate game the following 5 April, a 1–1 draw away to Kettering Town, he was dismissed after half an hour for shoving James Jennings.

=== Conference years ===
In 2010, Wright moved to another Conference team in Cambridgeshire, Cambridge United, on a three-year deal. He spent one season there, being the top scorer in a struggling team, before leaving to Wrexham for an undisclosed fee on 14 June 2011 to balance the books.

At Wrexham, he scored in each leg of their FA Trophy semi-final 4–2 aggregate win over Gainsborough Trinity in February 2013. In the final at Wembley Stadium on 24 March, he played the full 120 minutes of a 1–1 draw and scored in the penalty shootout win over Grimsby Town.

In May 2013, he left Wrexham and secured a move to Forest Green Rovers where he agreed a two-year contract. He scored his first goal for Forest Green on the opening day of the 2013–14 season in an 8–0 home win over Hyde.

He joined Gateshead on a free transfer on a one-year deal on 29 August 2014. He only remained on Tyneside until 20 January 2015, when he signed for Kidderminster Harriers until the end of the season to be closer to his family in Gloucester.

=== Cheltenham Town ===
Although Kidderminster wanted to keep Wright, he signed a one-year deal at Cheltenham Town on 30 June 2015. His new manager Gary Johnson said that he was the "target man" needed at the club. On 20 February 2016, he scored the only goal in a win at Tranmere Rovers, his eighth in the space of six consecutive games. Cheltenham ended up winning the National League and returning to The Football League after a season's absence. However, Wright missed the conclusion of the season with a retrospective three-match ban for stamping on Grimsby Town goalkeeper James McKeown while celebrating a goal he had set up for Harry Pell in a 3–1 win at Whaddon Road. He spoke to the press at his relief of finally winning the National League after eight previous attempts, and said he wanted a new contract as it was his dream to play in The Football League.

In the 2016–17 season, Wright made his Football League debut at the age of 31, in a 1–1 home draw against Leyton Orient on 6 August. He scored his first goal in the division on 10 September, his 32nd birthday, a penalty in a 2–2 draw at Newport County.

On 10 May 2018, it was announced that Wright would leave Cheltenham at the end of his current deal in June 2018.

=== Solihull Moors ===
After leaving Cheltenham, Wright returned to the National League by signing for Solihull Moors. The club from the West Midlands beat Hereford to his signature. On 9 February 2019 he was one of four players – two on each team – sent off in a brawl at the end of a 1–0 win at Ebbsfleet United. He scored 11 goals in 41 league games in his first season, concluding with one in a 3–2 win over Havant & Waterlooville on 13 April to seal a play-off place.

=== Havant & Waterlooville ===
Wright joined National League South club Havant & Waterlooville in June 2022 following his release from Torquay United.

=== Gloucester City ===
He joined National League North club Gloucester City on a one-year deal.

== Personal life ==
Wright worked as a carpenter while playing for Dereham. In December 2015, his partner Lisa Chew gave birth to their son Ronny 9; the unusual middle name stems from Wright's shirt number.

== Career statistics ==
=== Club ===
As of end of 2021–22 season

Appearances and goals by club, season and competition
Club	Season	League			FA Cup		League Cup		Other		Total	
Club	Season	Division	Apps	Goals	Apps	Goals	Apps	Goals	Apps	Goals	Apps	Goals
Histon	2007–08	Conference Premier	41	15	1	0	---		3 (Note: One appearance in the Conference League Cup and two in the FA Trophy)	0	45	15
Histon	2008–09	Conference Premier	37	10	3	1	---		1 (Note: Appearance in the FA Trophy)	0	41	11
Histon	2008–10	Conference Premier	25	8	0	0	---		0	0	25	8
Histon	Histon total		103	33	4	1	---		4	0	111	34
Cambridge United	2010–11	Conference Premier	44	10	2	0	---		0	0	46	10
Wrexham	2011–12	Conference Premier	32	6	4	1	---		2 (Note: Appearances in the Conference play-offs)	0	38	7
Wrexham	2012–13	Conference Premier	41	15	1	1	---		0	0	42	16
Wrexham	Wrexham total		73	21	5	2	---		2	0	80	23
Forest Green Rovers	2013–14	Conference Premier	40	8	0	0	---		0	0	40	8
Gateshead United	2014–15	Conference Premier	20	7	3	1	---		0	0	23	8
Kidderminster Harriers	2014–15	Conference Premier	16	4	0	0	---		0	0	16	4
Cheltenham Town	2015–16	National League	43	22	1	0	---		0	0	44	22
Cheltenham Town	2016–17	League Two	41	9	3	1	2	0	5 (Note: Appearances in the Football League Trophy)	1	51	11
Cheltenham Town	2017–18	League Two	33	3	1	0	2	2	1	0	37	5
Cheltenham Town	Cheltenham total		117	34	5	1	4	2	6	1	132	38
Solihull Moors	2018–19	National League	41	11	4	1	—		4 (Note: 3 appearances in FA Trophy, one in National League Play Offs)	0	49	12
Solihull Moors	2019–20	National League	31	5	3	0	—		2	0	36	5
Solihull Moors	Solihull Moors Total		72	16	7	1	—		6	0	85	17
Torquay United	2020–21	National League	19	9	2	0	—		2 (Note: Appearance(s) in National League play-offs)	2	23	11
Torquay United	2021–22	National League	33	5	0	0	—		1	1	34	6
Torquay United	Torquay United Total		52	14	2	0	0	0	3	3	57	17
Career total			537	147	28	6	4	2	21	4	590	159

== Honours ==
Histon

- Conference South: 2006–07

Wrexham

- FA Trophy: 2012–13

Cheltenham Town

- National League: 2015–16
