= Calum Kitscha =

English footballer

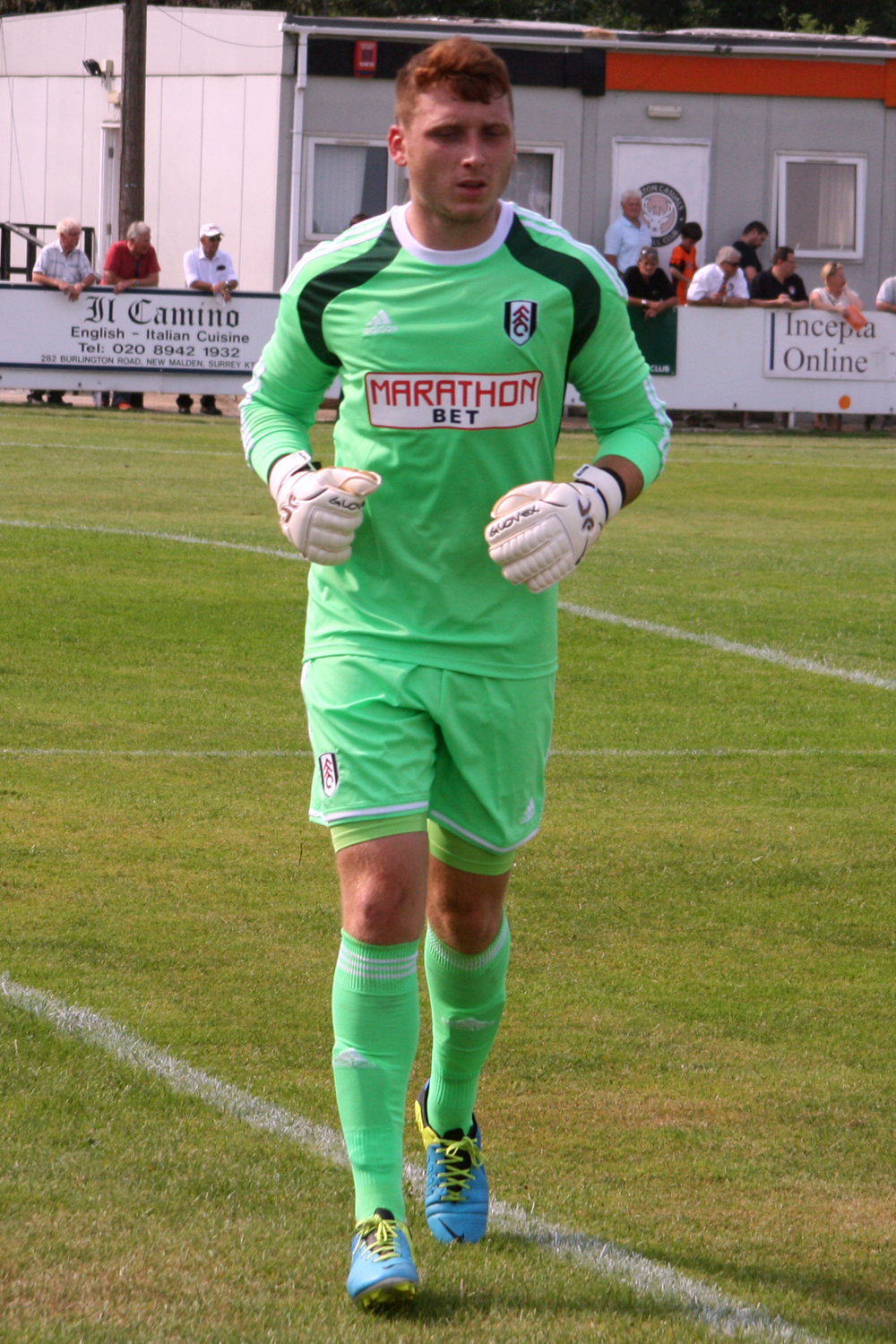
- Kitscha playing for Fulham U21s in July 2014

Personal information
- Full name: Calum Peter O'Connor-Kitscha
- Date of birth: 6 April 1993 (age 33)
- Place of birth: Enfield, England
- Height: 1.88 m (6 ft 2 in)
- Position: Goalkeeper

Team information
- Current team: Ware

Youth career
- –2010: Bishop's Stortford

Senior career*
Years	Team	Apps	(Gls)
2010–2011	Bishop's Stortford		
2011–2014	Histon	65	(0)
2012	→ Walton & Hersham (loan)		
2014–2015	Hayes & Yeading United	22	(0)
2015–2017	Cheltenham Town	1	(0)
2016	→ Worcester City (loan)	4	(0)
2017	Welling United	2	(0)
2018	Bishop's Stortford	13	(0)
2018	Hoddesdon Town	1	(0)
2018–2019	Welling United	27	(0)
2019–	Ware	16	(0)

International career
2014–2015	England C	3	(0)
- * Club domestic league appearances and goals as of 16:35, 8 May 2019 (UTC)

Calum Peter O'Connor-Kitscha (born 6 April 1993) is an English professional footballer who plays as a goalkeeper for Ware.

== Club career ==
After starting his career at Bishop's Stortford, Kitscha joined Conference South side Histon in 2011. Kitscha went onto make over fifty appearances for Histon, before leaving to join Hayes & Yeading United for the 2014–15 campaign. On 9 August 2014, Kitscha made his Hayes & Yeading United debut in their 1–0 away victory against St Albans City. Kitscha went onto make twenty more appearances for Hayes & Yeading that season, operating as a back-up to Grant Smith for the remainder of the campaign.

On 9 July 2015, preceding his release from Hayes & Yeading, Kitscha joined National League side Cheltenham Town on a one-year deal. On 12 December 2015, Kitscha made his Cheltenham Town debut in their FA Trophy tie against Chelmsford City, which resulted in a 3–1 victory. On 30 August 2016, after signing a new one-year deal in June 2016, Kitscha made his Football League debut during an EFL Trophy tie against Blackpool, with the fixture resulting in a 2–1 defeat for the Robins. On 9 May 2017, it was announced that Kitscha would leave Cheltenham upon the expiry of his contract in June 2017.

On 10 November 2017, Kitscha joined National League South side Welling United, following his release from Cheltenham in June. In February 2018, he then joined Bishop's Stortford FC. He played 13 games for the club, before he joined Hoddesdon Town. After a brief spell with Hoddesdon Town, Kitsche re-joined Bishop's Stortford FC. On 24 January 2019, he then joined Ware FC.

== Career statistics ==
As of match played 18 November 2017.

Appearances and goals by club, season and competition
Club	Season	League			FA Cup		League Cup		Other		Total	
Club	Season	Division	Apps	Goals	Apps	Goals	Apps	Goals	Apps	Goals	Apps	Goals
Histon	2011–12	Conference North	2	0	0	0	—		0	0	2	0
Histon	2012–13	Conference North	28	0	1	0	—		0	0	29	0
Histon	2013–14	Conference North	35	0	2	0	—		1 (Note: Appearance(s) in FA Trophy)	0	38	0
Histon	Total		65	0	3	0	—		1	0	69	0
Hayes & Yeading United	2014–15	Conference South	22	0	1	0	—		0	0	23	0
Cheltenham Town	2015–16	National League	1	0	0	0	—		3	0	4	0
Cheltenham Town	2016–17	League Two	0	0	0	0	0	0	5 (Note: Appearance(s) in EFL Trophy)	0	5	0
Cheltenham Town	Total		1	0	0	0	0	0	8	0	9	0
Worcester City (loan)	2015–16	National League North	4	0	0	0	—		0	0	4	0
Welling United	2017–18	National League South	2	0	0	0	—		0	0	2	0
Career total			94	0	4	0	0	0	9	0	107	0

== Honours ==
=== Cheltenham Town ===
Vanarama National League Winners: 2015-16
