= 2020–21 National League =

National League
- Season: 2020–21
- Dates: 3 October 2020 – 29 May 2021
- Champions: Sutton United
- Promoted: Hartlepool United
- Relegated: N/A
- Top goalscorer: (England) Michael Cheek (21 goals)
- Biggest home win: Chesterfield 6–0 Barnet (12 December 2020)
- Biggest away win: Wealdstone 0–6 Maidenhead United (20 April 2021)
- Highest scoring: Wealdstone 2–7 Hartlepool United; 17 April 2021)

The 2020–21 National League season, known as the Vanarama National League for sponsorship reasons, was the sixth season under English football's new title of the National League, the seventeenth season consisting of three divisions, and the forty-second season overall.

The season followed the curtailed 2019–20 season, in which the league phase was uncompleted due to the COVID-19 pandemic and the play-offs only completed by 2 August 2020. Reflecting the late end to the previous season and aiming at maximising the likelihood of fans being present in stadiums when the season starts, the 2020–21 National League began on 3 October 2020. The planned increase of the North and South divisions to 24 teams was scheduled to take place for 2021–22, meaning only two from the North and one from the South were to be relegated to the premier divisions of the Northern Premier League, Southern League Central or South, or Isthmian League. However, on 18 February 2021, the highest spike in UK deaths during the entire COVID-19 pandemic caused the cessation and voidance of the 2020–21 seasons for the North and South divisions, with promotion and relegation being suspended. For that reason, the expansion plans were deferred to 2022–23, when they would be implemented before that season.

== National League ==
National League
- Season: 2020–21

On 16 September 2020, Macclesfield Town folded as a result of debts, and were expelled from the National League on 29 September. As the club folded before the season started, no records were expunged.

Due to Macclesfield's closure, only 23 clubs took part in the 2020–21 season and a maximum of three clubs were to be relegated instead of the usual four. However, on 26 March 2021, having not fulfilled a fixture since 30 January, Dover Athletic's results were expunged and the club deducted 12 points for the 2021–22 season. Therefore the season is set to complete with 22 clubs playing fixtures.

Additionally, when an ongoing spike in UK deaths related to the COVID-19 pandemic led to the National League North and South divisions being declared null and void on 18 February, no teams were relegated this season.

=== Team changes ===
==== To National League ====
Promoted from 2019–20 National League North

- King's Lynn Town
- Altrincham

Promoted from 2019–20 National League South

- Wealdstone
- Weymouth

Relegated from 2019–20 League Two

- Macclesfield Town

==== From National League ====
Promoted to 2020–21 League Two

- Barrow
- Harrogate Town

Relegated to 2020–21 National League North

- AFC Fylde
- Chorley

Relegated to 2020–21 National League South

- Ebbsfleet United

=== Stadia and locations ===
Locations of the 2020–21 National League clubs (Greater London shown in more detail below)
Locations of the 2020–21 National League clubs (Greater London)

Team	Location	Stadium	Capacity
Aldershot Town	Aldershot	Recreation Ground	7,200
Altrincham	Altrincham	Moss Lane	7,700
Barnet	London (Canons Park)	The Hive Stadium	6,418
Boreham Wood	Borehamwood	Meadow Park	4,502
Bromley	London (Bromley)	Hayes Lane	5,300
Chesterfield	Chesterfield	Proact Stadium	10,504
Dagenham & Redbridge	London (Dagenham)	Victoria Road	6,078
Dover Athletic	Dover	Crabble Athletic Ground	5,745
Eastleigh	Eastleigh	Ten Acres	5,250
FC Halifax Town	Halifax	The Shay	10,400
Hartlepool United	Hartlepool	Victoria Park	7,856
King's Lynn Town	King's Lynn	The Walks	8,200
Maidenhead United	Maidenhead	York Road	4,000
Notts County	Nottingham	Meadow Lane	19,588
Solihull Moors	Solihull	Damson Park	5,500
Stockport County	Stockport	Edgeley Park	10,852
Sutton United	London (Sutton)	Gander Green Lane	5,013
Torquay United	Torquay	Plainmoor	6,500
Wealdstone	London (Ruislip)	Grosvenor Vale	4,085
Weymouth	Weymouth	Bob Lucas Stadium	6,600
Woking	Woking	Kingfield Stadium	6,036
Wrexham	Wrexham	Racecourse Ground	10,771
Yeovil Town	Yeovil	Huish Park	9,566

=== Personnel and sponsoring ===
Team	Manager^{1}	Captain	Kit manufacturer	Shirt sponsor
Aldershot Town	Danny Searle	Lewis Kinsella	Erreà	Bridges Estate Agents
Altrincham	Phil Parkinson	Jake Moult	SK Kits	J Davidson Ltd
Barnet	Simon Bassey	James Dunne	Jako	Canon
Boreham Wood	Luke Garrard	Mark Ricketts	Puma	Barnet and Southgate College
Bromley	Andy Woodman	Jack Holland	Macron	Southwark Metals
Chesterfield	James Rowe	Jonathan Smith	Puma	Technique Learning Solutions
Dagenham & Redbridge	Daryl McMahon	Kenny Clark	Nike	West & Coe
Dover Athletic	Andy Hessenthaler	Sam Wood	Kappa	GSH Group
Eastleigh	Ben Strevens	Danny Hollands	Kappa	Utilita
FC Halifax Town	Pete Wild	Nathan Clarke	Adidas	CORE Facility Services (Home); Nuie (Away)
Hartlepool United	Dave Challinor	Ryan Donaldson	O'Neills	Prestige Group Ltd
King's Lynn Town	Ian Culverhouse	Aaron Jones	Kappa	Barsby Produce
Maidenhead United	Alan Devonshire	Alan Massey	Uhlsport	G&L Scientific
Notts County	Ian Burchnall	Michael Doyle	Puma	Sharpes of Nottingham
Solihull Moors	Mark Yates	Kyle Storer	Surridge	John Shepherd Estate Agents
Stockport County	Simon Rusk	Sam Minihan	Puma	Pioneer Group
Sutton United	Matt Gray	Craig Eastmond	Macron	Angel Plastics
Torquay United	Gary Johnson	Asa Hall	Nike	No Sponsor
Wealdstone	Stuart Maynard	Jerome Okimo	Macron	GPF Lewis
Weymouth	Brian Stock	Josh Wakefield	Umbro	Terras Family
Woking	Alan Dowson	Josh Casey	Macron	Abstract Plans
Wrexham	Dean Keates	Shaun Pearson	Macron	Ifor Williams Trailers
Yeovil Town	Darren Sarll	Vacant^{1}	Macron	Adam Stansfield Foundation

1. Yeovil Town club captain Lee Collins died on 31 March 2021 at the age of 32.

=== Managerial changes ===
Team	Outgoing manager	Manner of departure	Date of vacancy	Position in table	Incoming manager	Date of appointment
Barnet	Darren Currie	Resigned	12 August 2020	Pre-season	Peter Beadle	22 August 2020
Weymouth	Mark Molesley	Signed by Southend United	13 August 2020	Pre-season	Brian Stock	4 September 2020
Chesterfield	John Pemberton	Sacked	18 November 2020	21st	James Rowe	26 November 2020
Barnet	Peter Beadle	Sacked	13 December 2020	20th	Tim Flowers	14 December 2020
Stockport County	Jim Gannon	Sacked	21 January 2021	4th	Simon Rusk	27 January 2021
Wealdstone	Dean Brennan	Resigned	2 February 2021	18th	Stuart Maynard	11 March 2021
Solihull Moors	James Shan	Sacked	10 March 2021	17th	Mark Yates	11 March 2021
Barnet	Tim Flowers	Sacked	10 March 2021	22nd	Simon Bassey	7 April 2021
Notts County	Neal Ardley	Sacked	24 March 2021	6th	Ian Burchnall	25 March 2021
Bromley	Neil Smith	Sacked	25 March 2021	7th	Andy Woodman	29 March 2021

=== National League table ===
Pos	Team	Pld	W	D	L	GF	GA	GD	Pts	Promotion, qualification or relegation
1	Sutton United (C, P)	42	25	9	8	72	36	+36	84	Promotion to EFL League Two
2	Torquay United	42	23	11	8	68	39	+29	80	Qualification for the National League play-off semi-finals
3	Stockport County	42	21	14	7	69	32	+37	77	Qualification for the National League play-off semi-finals
4	Hartlepool United (O, P)	42	22	10	10	66	43	+23	76	Qualification for the National League play-off quarter-finals
5	Notts County	42	20	10	12	62	41	+21	70	Qualification for the National League play-off quarter-finals
6	Chesterfield	42	21	6	15	60	43	+17	69	Qualification for the National League play-off quarter-finals
7	Bromley	42	19	12	11	63	53	+10	69	Qualification for the National League play-off quarter-finals
8	Wrexham	42	19	11	12	64	43	+21	68	
9	Eastleigh	42	18	12	12	49	40	+9	66	
10	FC Halifax Town	42	19	8	15	63	54	+9	65	
11	Solihull Moors	42	19	7	16	58	48	+10	64	
12	Dagenham & Redbridge	42	17	9	16	53	48	+5	60	
13	Maidenhead United	42	15	11	16	62	60	+2	56	
14	Boreham Wood	42	13	16	13	52	48	+4	55	
15	Aldershot Town	42	15	7	20	59	66	−7	52	
16	Yeovil Town	42	15	7	20	58	68	−10	52	
17	Altrincham	42	12	11	19	46	60	−14	47	
18	Weymouth	42	11	6	25	45	71	−26	39	
19	Wealdstone	42	10	7	25	49	99	−50	37	
20	Woking	42	8	9	25	42	69	−27	33	
21	King's Lynn Town	42	7	10	25	50	98	−48	31	Reprieved from relegation (Note: Due to the cancellation of both the National North and South seasons, there was no relegation from the National League in the 2020-21 season.)
22	Barnet	42	8	7	27	37	88	−51	31	Reprieved from relegation
23	Dover Athletic	0	0	0	0	0	0	0	0 (Note: Dover Athletic refused to play matches due to a lack of promised funding starting with their fixture on 30 January 2021. On 26 March 2021, it was announced the club would play no part in the rest of the season and all results would be expunged.)	Results expunged
24	Macclesfield Town	0	0	0	0	0	0	0	0 (Note: Macclesfield were deducted 17 points for entering into an insolvency event the previous season, before being expelled from the league on 29 September 2020. At the time of their expulsion before the 2020–21 National League Season, they had played no matches.)	Club expelled and folded

Source: National League official site
Rules for classification: 1) Points; 2) Goal difference; 3) Number of goals scored; 4) Number of matches won; 5) Head-to-head results
(C) Champions; (O) Play-off winners; (P) Promoted

=== Results table ===
Home \ Away	ALD	ALT	BRN	BOR	BRO	CHE	DAG	EAS	HAL	HAR	KIN	MDH	NOT	SOL	STO	SUT	TOR	WEA	WEY	WOK	WRE	YEO
Aldershot	—	2–1	2–1	3–3	2–3	0–1	2–1	1–3	1–3	1–3	1–1	0–0	1–0	1–3	1–2	1–2	1–4	2–0	0–2	3–0	3–0	2–0
Altrincham	1–2	—	2–3	2–3	0–1	3–2	0–1	1–1	0–1	1–1	3–0	2–0	1–1	0–2	1–1	0–4	0–0	2–0	0–0	1–0	1–2	4–3
Barnet	3–1	1–2	—	0–3	1–3	0–2	0–2	1–5	2–1	0–0	0–2	2–0	1–4	0–2	1–2	2–0	0–2	0–0	1–0	0–2	0–2	1–4
Boreham	3–2	0–1	0–0	—	1–1	0–0	0–1	1–2	0–0	2–2	5–1	1–4	2–2	2–2	0–3	0–0	0–0	3–1	1–0	1–0	2–3	2–3
Bromley	2–0	3–1	2–2	1–1	—	1–2	1–0	1–2	1–2	1–0	2–0	2–2	1–0	1–0	0–2	1–3	1–2	2–2	3–2	2–2	1–1	1–2
Chesterfield	0–0	1–0	6–0	0–0	1–2	—	2–1	1–0	1–2	1–2	4–1	1–2	2–3	1–0	1–2	0–1	0–2	0–0	1–0	4–0	2–1	3–0
Dagenham & R	0–2	0–1	1–2	2–2	1–0	2–2	—	2–0	3–0	0–1	3–2	2–1	0–0	3–2	0–2	1–2	1–0	1–0	1–1	3–1	1–1	0–0
Eastleigh	2–2	1–1	3–0	1–0	1–2	0–1	3–0	—	1–0	2–1	0–1	0–1	2–0	1–1	1–0	1–0	2–1	2–0	0–0	0–0	1–1	1–0
Halifax	1–0	3–2	5–2	0–1	1–2	1–2	2–0	3–1	—	1–1	4–2	2–3	1–1	1–0	0–1	2–2	1–2	0–1	3–2	1–0	0–4	1–1
Hartlepool U	2–1	1–1	1–0	1–2	0–0	3–1	2–1	0–0	3–1	—	2–0	2–4	2–0	2–0	4–0	1–0	0–5	3–1	4–0	1–0	0–1	2–1
King's Lynn	4–4	2–0	5–1	0–3	1–4	1–2	0–3	2–1	1–1	2–2	—	0–0	0–1	1–1	0–4	0–1	0–0	2–3	2–2	3–2	0–2	2–2
Maidenhead	2–4	0–1	0–0	0–1	2–2	2–0	2–1	0–1	1–2	0–4	2–3	—	0–4	3–1	0–0	0–3	4–1	4–0	0–1	2–1	2–2	4–2
Notts C	0–1	3–1	4–2	0–1	2–2	0–1	3–1	0–1	1–2	0–1	2–2	2–3	—	2–0	1–0	3–2	0–0	3–0	3–0	1–0	1–0	2–0
Solihull Moors	1–0	4–0	1–0	1–0	0–1	2–1	0–1	2–0	2–1	2–0	5–0	1–1	2–1	—	0–5	0–0	1–2	3–0	2–1	2–1	1–0	5–1
Stockport C	0–0	2–2	2–1	1–1	0–0	2–0	1–1	3–0	2–1	1–1	4–0	2–2	0–0	0–0	—	0–2	2–2	4–0	1–2	1–1	2–0	1–0
Sutton Un	3–1	2–2	1–0	2–0	3–2	0–1	1–1	3–0	1–0	3–0	5–1	3–0	0–1	4–1	1–1	—	0–1	4–1	2–0	3–2	0–0	2–1
Torquay	2–1	1–2	2–2	1–1	0–0	2–1	0–1	3–1	2–3	0–1	1–0	2–1	2–2	2–0	1–0	0–0	—	1–1	2–1	1–0	3–1	6–1
Wealdstone	3–4	1–0	5–1	1–0	0–1	3–2	0–5	0–0	1–2	2–7	3–1	0–6	0–1	1–4	2–5	3–3	1–2	—	2–1	0–1	4–3	0–2
Weymouth	0–3	2–1	0–2	1–3	2–1	1–2	2–3	1–1	1–5	1–0	2–1	2–1	0–1	0–0	1–0	0–1	3–4	4–0	—	0–1	2–3	0–3
Woking	0–1	1–1	4–1	0–0	3–4	1–4	2–0	0–0	0–0	3–0	3–0	0–0	2–4	2–1	1–4	0–1	0–2	2–4	2–4	—	0–4	1–1
Wrexham	1–0	0–1	0–0	2–1	3–0	0–0	2–2	2–2	0–0	0–0	5–3	0–1	0–1	2–1	0–3	4–0	0–1	4–1	2–0	2–0	—	3–0
Yeovil T	3–0	2–0	3–1	1–0	1–2	0–1	1–0	1–3	0–3	1–3	3–1	0–0	2–2	3–0	0–1	1–2	2–1	2–2	3–1	2–1	0–1	—

Updated to match(es) played on unknown. Source: National League Results Grid
Legend: Blue = home team win; Yellow = draw; Red = away team win.
For upcoming matches, an "a" indicates there is an article about the rivalry between the two participants.

=== Play-offs ===
Quarter-finals
5	Notts County	3
6	Chesterfield	2
4	Hartlepool United	3
7	Bromley	2

Semi-finals
2	Torquay United	4
5	Notts County	2
3	Stockport County	0
4	Hartlepool United	1

Final
2	Torquay United	1 (4)
4	Hartlepool United	1 (5)

==== Quarter-finals ====
5 June 2021	Notts County	3–2	Chesterfield	Nottingham
16:00	Wootton 30', 71'; Ellis 90'	Report	Rowe 27'; Mandeville 42'	Stadium: Meadow Lane; Attendance: 4,569

6 June 2021	Hartlepool United	3–2	Bromley	Hartlepool
14:30	Oates 17', 24'; Armstrong 20'	Report	Alabi 48'; Webster 90+3'	Stadium: Victoria Park; Attendance: 1,700

==== Semi-finals ====
12 June 2021	Torquay United	4–2 (a.e.t.)	Notts County	Torquay
12:00	Wright 1', 48'; Hall 102'; Moxey 109' (pen.)	Report	Rodrigues 39'; Chicksen 51'	Stadium: Plainmoor; Attendance: 1,709

13 June 2021	Stockport County	0–1	Hartlepool United	Edgeley
12:00		Report	Oates 76'	Stadium: Edgeley Park; Attendance: 2,758

==== Final ====
20 June 2021
14:00 BST

Torquay United	1–1 (a.e.t.)	Hartlepool United
Covolan 90+5'	Report	Armstrong 35'
Penalties
Waters (penalty missed); Wright (penalty missed); Hall (penalty scored); Lewis (penalty scored); Little (penalty scored); Lemonheigh-Evans (penalty scored); Buse (penalty missed)	4–5	(penalty missed) Featherstone; (penalty missed) Armstrong; (penalty scored) Shelton; (penalty scored) Sterry; (penalty scored) Molyneux; (penalty scored) Elliott; (penalty scored) Donaldson

Ashton Gate Stadium, Bristol
Attendance: 6,606
Referee: Simon Mather

=== Top scorers ===
Rank	Player	Club	Goals
1	(England) Michael Cheek	Bromley	21
2	(England) Danilo Orsi-Dadomo	Maidenhead United	19
3	(England) Kabongo Tshimanga	Boreham Wood	18
4	(England) Alex Reid	Stockport County	16
5	(England) Sam Barratt	Maidenhead United	15
5	(England) Paul McCallum	Dagenham & Redbridge	15
5	(England) Kyle Wootton	Notts County	15
8	(England) Rhys Oates	Hartlepool United	14
8	(England) Isaac Olaofe	Sutton United	14
8	(England) John Rooney	Stockport County	14

=== Hat-tricks ===
Player	For	Against	Result	Date
(England) John Rooney	Stockport County	Wealdstone	5–2	13 October 2020
(England) Danny Parish	Wealdstone	King's Lynn Town	3–2	27 October 2020
(England) Sam Barratt	Maidenhead United	Solihull Moors	3–1	31 October 2020
(England) Danny Wright	Torquay United	Hartlepool United	5–0	31 October 2020
(England) Isaac Olaofe	Sutton United	King's Lynn Town	5–1	14 November 2020
(Netherlands) Akwasi Asante	Chesterfield	Barnet	6–0	12 December 2020
(Republic of Ireland) Rhys Murphy	Yeovil Town	Weymouth	3–1	23 February 2021
(England) Josh Rees	Aldershot Town	Maidenhead United	4–2	23 February 2021
(England) Jimmy Knowles	Notts County	Woking	4–2	5 April 2021
(Wales) Jordan Davies	Wrexham	FC Halifax Town	4–0	13 April 2021
(England) Richie Bennett	Hartlepool United	Wealdstone	7–2	17 April 2021
(England) Danilo Orsi-Dadomo	Maidenhead United	Wealdstone	6–0	20 April 2021
(Bermuda) Justin Donawa	Solihull Moors	Yeovil Town	5–1	24 April 2021
(Republic of Ireland) Joe Quigley	Yeovil Town	Solihull Moors	3–0	27 April 2021
(England) Kabongo Tshimanga	Boreham Wood	King's Lynn Town	5–1	3 May 2021
(England) Sam Barratt	Maidenhead United	Hartlepool United	4–2	8 May 2021
(Republic of Ireland) Jim O'Brien	Notts County	Maidenhead United	4–0	11 May 2021

=== Monthly awards ===
Each month the Motorama National League announces their official Player of the Month and Manager of the Month.

Month	Player of the Month	Club	Manager of the Month	Club
October 2020	(Scotland) Ben House	Eastleigh	(England) Gary Johnson	Torquay United
November 2020	(England) Luke Young	Wrexham	(England) Dean Keates	Wrexham
December 2020	(England) Luke Summerfield	FC Halifax Town	(England) Luke Garrard	Boreham Wood
January 2021	(Albania) Albi Skendi	Yeovil Town	(England) Neal Ardley	Notts County
February 2021	(England) Craig Eastmond	Sutton United	(England) Matt Gray	Sutton United
March 2021	(Colombia) Ángelo Balanta	Dagenham & Redbridge	(England) James Rowe	Chesterfield
April 2021	(Republic of Ireland) Gavan Holohan	Hartlepool United	(England) Gary Johnson	Torquay United
May 2021	(Portugal) Rúben Rodrigues	Notts County	(England) Andy Woodman	Bromley

== National League North ==
National League North
- Season: 2020–21
- Champions: Gloucester City

The National League North in 2020-21 consisted of 22 teams. Due to the initially anticipated expansion to 24 teams for 2021–22, only two teams instead of the usual four were expected to be relegated. However, the knock-on effect of Macclesfield Town's closure might have caused the number of relegated teams to be reduced even further.

Due to an ongoing spike in UK deaths related to the COVID-19 pandemic, the league was declared null and void on 18 February 2021. As a result, all records were expunged and no teams were promoted or relegated.

=== Team changes ===
Following the COVID-19 pandemic-related cancellation of the four step 3 leagues' 2019–20 seasons, no teams were promoted to or relegated from the National League North.

==== To National League North ====
Relegated from 2019–20 National League

- AFC Fylde
- Chorley

==== From National League North ====
Promoted to 2020–21 National League

- King's Lynn Town
- Altrincham

=== Stadia and locations ===
Locations of the 2020–21 National League North clubs

Team	Location	Stadium	Capacity
AFC Fylde	Wesham	Mill Farm Sports Village	6,000
AFC Telford United	Wellington	New Bucks Head	6,300
Alfreton Town	Alfreton	North Street	3,600
Blyth Spartans	Blyth	Croft Park	4,435
Boston United	Boston	Jakemans Community Stadium	5,061
Brackley Town	Brackley	St. James Park	3,500
Bradford (Park Avenue)	Bradford	Horsfall Stadium	3,500
Chester	Chester	Deva Stadium	6,500
Chorley	Chorley	Victory Park	4,100
Curzon Ashton	Ashton-under-Lyne	Tameside Stadium	4,000
Darlington	Darlington	Blackwell Meadows	3,300
Farsley Celtic	Farsley	The Citadel	3,900
Gateshead	Gateshead	Gateshead International Stadium	11,800
Gloucester City	Gloucester	Meadow Park	3,600
Guiseley	Guiseley	Nethermoor Park	4,200
Hereford	Hereford	Edgar Street	5,213
Kettering Town	Burton Latimer	Latimer Park (groundshare with Burton Park Wanderers)	2,400
Kidderminster Harriers	Kidderminster	Aggborough Stadium	6,238
Leamington	Leamington	New Windmill Ground	2,300
Southport	Southport	Haig Avenue	6,008
Spennymoor Town	Spennymoor	The Brewery Field	4,300
York City	York	Bootham Crescent	8,256

=== Managerial changes ===
Team	Outgoing manager	Manner of departure	Date of vacancy	Position in table	Incoming manager	Date of appointment
Gloucester City	James Rowe	Signed by Chesterfield	24 November 2020	1st	Paul Groves	8 December 2020
Spennymoor Town	Jason Ainsley	Mutual consent	10 December 2020	9th	Tommy Miller	10 December 2020

=== National League North table ===
Pos	Team	Pld	W	D	L	GF	GA	GD	Pts
1	Gloucester City	18	10	5	3	36	22	+14	35
2	AFC Fylde	15	9	3	3	26	16	+10	30
3	Chester	17	8	4	5	32	25	+7	28
4	Brackley Town	16	7	6	3	22	19	+3	27
5	Kidderminster Harriers	15	7	4	4	24	17	+7	25
6	Boston United	13	6	5	2	20	10	+10	23
7	Chorley	18	6	5	7	21	24	−3	23
8	York City	13	6	4	3	22	17	+5	22
9	Leamington	15	5	7	3	22	20	+2	22
10	Gateshead	14	6	3	5	17	15	+2	21
11	Farsley Celtic	17	5	6	6	21	26	−5	21
12	Hereford	13	5	5	3	20	16	+4	20
13	Spennymoor Town	13	5	5	3	18	14	+4	20
14	AFC Telford United	17	5	4	8	17	23	−6	19
15	Bradford (Park Avenue)	16	4	6	6	26	30	−4	18
16	Curzon Ashton	17	4	5	8	18	26	−8	17
17	Southport	14	4	4	6	16	19	−3	16
18	Kettering Town	14	3	6	5	21	23	−2	15
19	Darlington	11	4	1	6	17	11	+6	13
20	Guiseley	15	3	3	9	17	22	−5	12
21	Alfreton Town	15	2	6	7	15	27	−12	12
22	Blyth Spartans	14	1	3	10	10	36	−26	6

Source: National League official site
Rules for classification: 1) Points; 2) Goal difference; 3) Number of goals scored; 4) Number of matches won; 5) Head-to-head results

=== Results ===
Home \ Away	FYL	TEL	ALF	BLY	BOS	BRA	BPA	CHE	CHO	CUR	DAR	FAR	GAT	GLO	GUI	HER	KET	KID	LEA	SOU	SPE	YOR
AFC Fylde	—				2–1		3–3		4–0		1–0	2–0					3–2				1–0	
AFC Telford United	0–2	—	0–1			3–0		1–2	0–1	1–1			1–0		2–0					1–1		
Alfreton Town	1–1		—			0–2			1–1		0–2	3–1					3–3				1–1	
Blyth Spartans		1–1		—	0–1							1–1	2–2			0–3				0–3		0–3
Boston United		3–2	2–0		—			0–0	0–2						1–1		2–2					
Brackley Town				2–1		—		1–1	2–1	2–2	2–0			3–2			1–1	0–2			1–0	
Bradford (Park Avenue)		1–2	2–0		1–1		—	3–3	0–0		2–0		1–2						1–3	0–2		4–2
Chester		3–0	3–0					—	1–2	2–1			1–2		1–0	5–3			3–2			
Chorley	3–1								—	1–1		3–2		1–2	1–0			0–2	1–2			
Curzon Ashton	2–0		1–1	0–3			3–0			—	0–3	2–1		0–1					0–3			
Darlington		1–2		6–0			0–1				—							1–3			0–0	
Farsley Celtic		2–0			0–4			2–2			1–0	—	1–0					2–2	1–1			1–1
Gateshead	0–1					2–2				1–0			—	1–0	1–0			0–1		4–1	1–3	
Gloucester City		4–1		6–1	0–0		4–4	2–1	1–1			1–2		—			3–1	3–2	1–0			
Guiseley				4–0		1–3					1–4	2–2		1–2	—	0–1				4–2		
Hereford	2–1					2–0	0–2		2–2					0–1		—	3–3	3–1				
Kettering Town		0–0		2–1		3–1				1–2					1–1		—			0–1		
Kidderminster Harriers			3–0	2–0				1–2		1–0						1–1	0–2	—	1–1			2–2
Leamington	1–1		4–3		0–4	1–1							1–1	1–1		0–0			—			2–1
Southport			1–1		0–1				1–0	2–2		0–1				0–0				—	0–2	2–3
Spennymoor Town							2–2	2–1		3–1		2–1		2–2	0–2						—	
York City	1–3					0–0		2–1	3–1						1–0		2–0				1–1	—

Source: National League North results grid
Legend: Blue = home team win; Yellow = draw; Red = away team win.

=== Top scorers ===
Rank	Player	Club	Goals
1	(Northern Ireland) Matt McClure	Gloucester City	12
2	(England) Lenell John-Lewis	Hereford	9
2	(England) Lewis Knight	Bradford (Park Avenue)	9
2	(England) Sam Osborne	Leamington / AFC Fylde	9
5	(Netherlands) Akwasi Asante	Gloucester City	8
5	(England) Glen Taylor	Spennymoor Town	8
7	(England) Danny Elliott	Chester	7
7	(England) Dominic Knowles	Curzon Ashton	7
7	(England) Sean Newton	York City	7
10	(Republic of Ireland) Shane Byrne	Brackley Town	6
10	(England) Nick Haughton	AFC Fylde	6
10	(England) Ashley Hemmings	Kidderminster Harriers	6
10	(England) Connor Kennedy	Kettering Town	6
10	(England) Callum Powell	Kettering Town	6
10	(England) Jimmy Spencer	Farsley Celtic	6
10	(England) Ben Tollitt	AFC Fylde	6

=== Hat-tricks ===
Player	For	Against	Result	Date
(Northern Ireland) Matt McClure	Gloucester City	Blyth Spartans	6–1	17 October 2020
(England) Gerard Garner	Gateshead	Southport	4–1	21 November 2020
(England) Ben Tollitt	AFC Fylde	Chorley	4–0	2 January 2021

=== Monthly awards ===
Each month the Motorama National League announces their official Player of the Month and Manager of the Month.

Month	Player of the Month	Club	Manager of the Month	Club
October 2020	(Northern Ireland) Matt McClure	Gloucester City	(England) Jim Bentley	AFC Fylde
November 2020	(England) Sam Osborne	Leamington	(England) Jamie Vermiglio	Chorley
December 2020	(England) Ross Fitzsimons	Boston United	(England) Kevin Wilkin	Brackley Town
January 2021	(England) George Glendon	Chester	(England) Paul Holleran	Leamington

== National League South ==
National League South
- Season: 2020–21
- Champions: Dorking Wanderers

The National League South consisted of 21 teams. Following Bury's expulsion from the English Football League in 2019, and the completion of the 2019–20 National League with two northern and one southern teams in the relegation zone, the division was left one team short. With the initially anticipated expansion to 24 teams for 2021–22, only one team was expected to be relegated.

Due to an ongoing spike in UK deaths related to the COVID-19 pandemic, the league was declared null and void on 18 February 2021. As a result, all records were expunged and no teams were promoted or relegated.

=== Team changes ===
Following the COVID-19 pandemic-related cancellation of the four step 3 leagues' 2019–20 seasons, no teams were promoted to or relegated from the National League South.

==== To National League South ====
Relegated from 2019–20 National League

- Ebbsfleet United

==== From National League South ====
Promoted to 2020–21 National League

- Wealdstone
- Weymouth

=== Stadia and locations ===
Locations of the 2020–21 National League South clubs (Greater London area shown in more detail below)
Locations of the 2020–21 National League South clubs (Greater London area)

Team	Location	Stadium	Capacity
Bath City	Bath (Twerton)	Twerton Park	8,840
Billericay Town	Billericay	New Lodge	3,500
Braintree Town	Braintree	Cressing Road	4,085
Chelmsford City	Chelmsford	Melbourne Stadium	3,019
Chippenham Town	Chippenham	Hardenhuish Park	3,000
Concord Rangers	Canvey Island	Thames Road	3,300
Dartford	Dartford	Princes Park	4,100
Dorking Wanderers	Dorking	Meadowbank Stadium	3,000
Dulwich Hamlet	London (East Dulwich)	Champion Hill	3,000
Eastbourne Borough	Eastbourne	Priory Lane	4,151
Ebbsfleet United	Northfleet	Stonebridge Road	4,800
Hampton & Richmond Borough	London (Hampton)	Beveree Stadium	3,500
Havant & Waterlooville	Havant	West Leigh Park	5,300
Hemel Hempstead Town	Hemel Hempstead	Vauxhall Road	3,152
Hungerford Town	Hungerford	Bulpit Lane	2,500
Maidstone United	Maidstone	Gallagher Stadium	4,200
Oxford City	Oxford (Marston)	Court Place Farm	2,000
Slough Town	Slough	Arbour Park	2,000
St Albans City	St Albans	Clarence Park	4,500
Tonbridge Angels	Tonbridge	Longmead Stadium	3,000
Welling United	London (Welling)	Park View Road	4,000

=== Managerial changes ===
Team	Outgoing manager	Manner of departure	Date of vacancy	Position in table	Incoming manager	Date of appointment
Braintree Town	George Borg	Resigned	16 November 2020	21st	Ryan Maxwell	18 November 2020
Billericay Town	Jamie O'Hara	Sacked	3 December 2020	15th	Kevin Watson	7 January 2021
Welling United	Bradley Quinton	Sacked	13 January 2021	21st	Steve Lovell	14 January 2021

=== National League South table ===
Pos	Team	Pld	W	D	L	GF	GA	GD	Pts
1	Dorking Wanderers	18	12	3	3	40	17	+23	39
2	Dartford	19	10	4	5	26	17	+9	34
3	Eastbourne Borough	19	9	6	4	36	26	+10	33
4	Oxford City	17	9	5	3	35	17	+18	32
5	St Albans City	15	9	5	1	22	10	+12	32
6	Hampton & Richmond Borough	17	9	2	6	24	16	+8	29
7	Hungerford Town	19	9	2	8	27	28	−1	29
8	Ebbsfleet United	18	8	4	6	26	24	+2	28
9	Havant & Waterlooville	14	6	2	6	25	21	+4	20
10	Hemel Hempstead Town	18	6	2	10	28	38	−10	20
11	Maidstone United	13	5	4	4	24	18	+6	19
12	Dulwich Hamlet	13	4	4	5	15	17	−2	16
13	Chelmsford City	16	4	4	8	21	25	−4	16
14	Tonbridge Angels	14	5	1	8	16	23	−7	16
15	Billericay Town	17	4	4	9	26	35	−9	16
16	Chippenham Town	14	4	4	6	13	22	−9	16
17	Concord Rangers	14	3	5	6	16	24	−8	14
18	Bath City	13	4	1	8	16	23	−7	13
19	Braintree Town	16	4	1	11	19	34	−15	13
20	Slough Town	12	3	3	6	16	24	−8	12
21	Welling United	14	2	6	6	18	30	−12	12

Source: National League official site
Rules for classification: 1) Points; 2) Goal difference; 3) Number of goals scored; 4) Number of matches won; 5) Head-to-head results

=== Results table ===
Home \ Away	BAT	BIL	BRA	CHE	CHI	CON	DAR	DOR	DUL	EAB	EBB	HAM	H&W	HEM	HUN	MAI	OXF	SLO	STA	TON	WEL
Bath City	—	2–0							1–4				2–1	1–2	0–2						
Billericay Town		—	3–1	3–3		0–1			2–0		1–2	2–6	1–2				1–3	2–0	2–2	0–2	
Braintree Town			—			1–0	2–1	0–4			0–3			3–4	1–2		1–2				1–1
Chelmsford City	3–4		4–2	—	0–2			0–1				0–1				1–0	1–1			0–2	
Chippenham Town	1–1		1–0		—	1–1	1–2				1–2	0–3						2–2			
Concord Rangers	3–2					—		1–3		2–2									1–1		1–1
Dartford	1–0	3–0		1–0			—	2–3		0–1	0–0		2–1		1–1			2–0	0–1	1–0	2–2
Dorking Wanderers	1–2							—	0–0		2–0	0–1		2–1		2–2	3–2	3–1		4–1	5–0
Dulwich Hamlet				0–0	0–2	1–4			—	2–1											
Eastbourne Borough		4–2	4–0	1–1		1–1	3–1	0–3		—	1–1				3–2	2–3			0–1		2–1
Ebbsfleet United						2–1			1–1		—	2–1	0–3		3–2	0–0				0–1	
Hampton & Richmond Borough	1–0						0–0	1–1	1–2	1–2	2–1	—		0–3					0–2		
Havant & Waterlooville				3–1					3–1	1–2	1–2		—	2–3	4–2	2–2	2–1	0–0			
Hemel Hempstead Town		1–4					1–3	1–3	1–1	1–4			2–0	—	0–1		3–5				1–2
Hungerford Town					3–0	1–0	1–2	2–0	0–3			0–1			—	2–1	1–4				
Maidstone United		1–1	0–2			6–0	0–2							4–1		—					2–1
Oxford City	2–0			4–1	1–1				1–0	1–1		0–2			4–0		—		0–0	4–0	0–0
Slough Town	2–1		3–2								0–2			1–0	1–3	2–3		—			4–4
St Albans City			2–1	0–2	3–0						3–2	1–0		1–1	0–0				—	3–1	
Tonbridge Angels			0–2		4–0	2–0				2–2		0–3		1–2	0–2					—	
Welling United		2–2		0–4	0–1						4–3								0–2		—

Source: National League official site
Legend: Blue = home team win; Yellow = draw; Red = away team win.

=== Top scorers ===
Rank	Player	Club	Goals
1	(England) Jason Prior	Dorking Wanderers	15
2	(England) Ryan Seager	Hungerford Town	14
3	(England) Jake Robinson	Billericay Town	12
4	(England) James Roberts	Oxford City	11
4	(England) Chris Whelpdale	Eastbourne Borough	11
6	(England) Rakish Bingham	Ebbsfleet United	9
6	(England) Shaun Jeffers	St Albans City	9
6	(England) Charlie Sheringham	Chelmsford City / Dartford	9
9	(England) Harvey Bradbury	Oxford City	8
9	(England) Tommy Wright	Havant & Waterlooville	8

=== Hat-tricks ===
Player	For	Against	Result	Date
(England) Jake Robinson	Billericay Town	Hemel Hempstead Town	4–1	3 November 2020
(England) Jason Prior	Dorking Wanderers	Tonbridge Angels	4–1	14 November 2020
(England) Tommy Wright	Havant & Waterlooville	Chelmsford City	3–1	5 December 2020
(England) Charlie Sheringham	Dartford	Billericay Town	3–0	12 January 2021

=== Monthly awards ===
Each month the Motorama National League announces their official Player of the Month and Manager of the Month.

Month	Player of the Month	Club	Manager of the Month	Club
October 2020	(England) Mike Jones	Hungerford Town	(England) Steve King	Dartford
November 2020	(England) Jason Prior	Dorking Wanderers	(England) Ian Allinson	St Albans City
December 2020	(England) Tommy Wright	Havant & Waterlooville	(England) David Oldfield	Oxford City
January 2021	(England) Ben Dudzinski	Oxford City	(England) Robbie Simpson	Chelmsford City
