= 2023–24 Ipswich Town F.C. season =

146th season in existence of Ipswich Town FC

Ipswich Town
2023–24 season
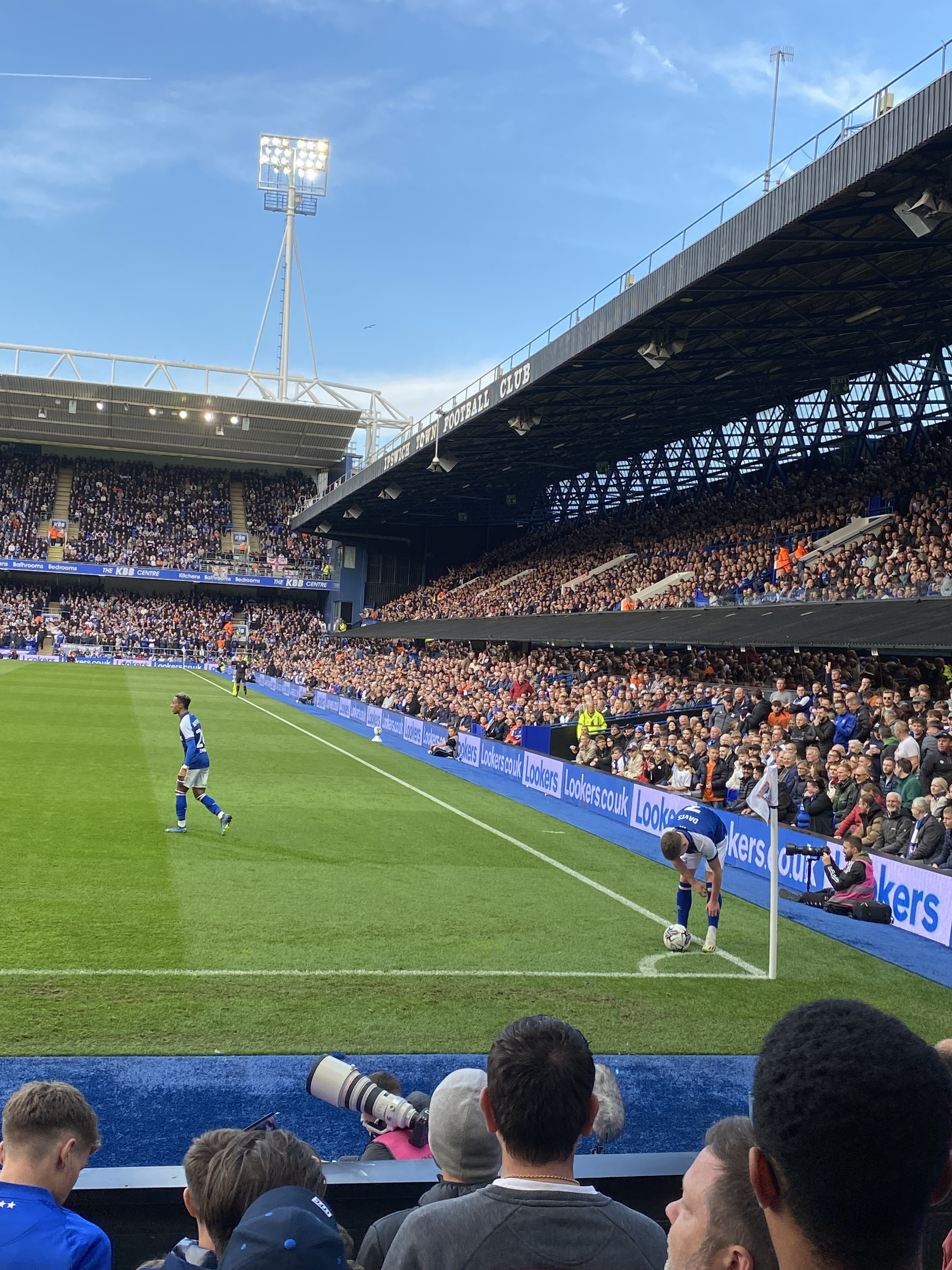
- Owner: Gamechanger 20 Ltd.
- Chairman: Mike O'Leary
- Manager: Kieran McKenna
- Stadium: Portman Road
- Championship: 2nd (promoted)
- FA Cup: Fourth round
- EFL Cup: Fourth round
- Top goalscorer: League: Nathan Broadhead; Conor Chaplin (13 each); All: Nathan Broadhead; Conor Chaplin (13 each)
- Highest home attendance: 29,611 (vs Norwich City, Championship, 16 December 2023)
- Lowest home attendance: 27,070 (vs Hull City, Championship, 3 October 2023)
- Average home league attendance: 28,843
- Biggest win: 6–0 (vs Sheffield Wednesday (H), Championship, 16 March 2024)
- Biggest defeat: 0–4 (vs Leeds United (A), Championship, 23 December 2023)
Home colours	Away colours	Third colours

The 2023–24 season was the 146th season in the existence of Ipswich Town and their first season back in the Championship following their promotion from League One. In addition to the domestic league, the club also competed in the FA Cup and EFL Cup.

Following a 2–0 victory at home to Huddersfield Town on the final matchday of the season, Ipswich confirmed a second-place finish in the Championship, securing back-to-back promotions and a return to the Premier League for the first time in 22 years.

== Season summary ==
=== August ===
Led by head coach Kieran McKenna, Ipswich Town got off to a winning start in their first Championship campaign for four years. McKenna led Ipswich to wins both in their first away game, a 2–1 victory against Sunderland, as well as their first home game, a 2–0 victory against Stoke City. The team also progressed into the second round of the EFL Cup following a 2–0 victory against Bristol Rovers at home, where new signings Cieran Slicker and Jack Taylor both made their debuts, and Taylor scored his first goal. On 19 August, Ipswich went on to claim three points from Loftus Road following a 75th-minute goal from Conor Chaplin to secure a 1–0 victory against Queens Park Rangers. The following week saw Ipswich's first league loss since January, with a 4–3 loss against Leeds United. This brought an end to a club record 21-game undefeated streak, dating back to February. Ipswich then progressed to the third round of the EFL Cup after winning on penalties against Reading.

=== September ===
Kieran McKenna's side started the month with a 3–2 win against Cardiff City on the 2nd of September, coming from behind with a brace from Freddie Ladapo and a goal from Nathan Broadhead. Following the international break, Ipswich gained six more points from a 1–0 away win against Sheffield Wednesday on the 16th of September, and three days later after a 1–0 win at Southampton. On 23 September, Ipswich played Blackburn Rovers at home, securing another 4–3 victory, before drawing 1–1 at the Kirklees Stadium against Huddersfield Town. Ipswich managed to maintain unbeaten in September, gaining thirteen out of a possible fifteen points, and scoring ten goals across five matches.

Ipswich also managed to come back from 2–0 down to win 3–2 against Wolverhampton Wanderers in the EFL Cup third round.

=== October ===
Ipswich's form continued into the next month with a 3–0 home victory against Hull City on 3 October to go top of the league, before going to win 4–2 against Preston North End four days later. The fixture against Rotherham, scheduled for 25 October, was cancelled due to flooding at the New York Stadium, and was rescheduled for Wednesday 7 November. This meant Town could complete a second consecutive unbeaten month, with a 3–2 victory against Plymouth Argyle on 28 October 2023.

=== November ===
Ipswich started off the next month with a Carabao Cup round-of-16 fixture on 1 November against Premier League side Fulham. Eleven changes, and a debut for Axel Tuanzebe for Ipswich resulted in a 1–3 home loss, however attention could now turn to the league, with those being the only fixtures until January. Form started to falter slightly, following a 2–2 draw on 4 November against Wayne Rooney's Birmingham, with Marcus Harness scoring a brace to confirm a point in the final fifteen minutes. This was followed up with another 2–2 draw against Rotherham United F.C on 7 November. Despite this, on 11 November 2023, Ipswich got back to winning ways with a 3–2 win against Swansea City, and went into the international break with 39 points, only below Leicester on goal difference (Leicester +19 GD, Ipswich +15 GD, both on 39 points). A 2–0 defeat at The Hawthorns to West Bromwich Albion ended Ipswich's twelve game unbeaten run, but a 3–1 home win against Millwall on 29 November meant Ipswich ended their month in winning fashion.

=== December ===
Ipswich started December strongly, gaining the maximum nine points from their first three games – a 2–1 home win over Coventry, a 2–0 away victory at Middlesbrough and a 2–1 away victory over Watford. The first East Anglian derby in five years against Norwich City ended 2–2 at Portman Road on 16 December 2023. A downturn in form followed as a result of an ensuing injury crisis, with a 4–0 loss at Elland Road to Leeds United, before a 1–1 home draw against Leicester on Boxing Day and a 0–0 home draw against Queen's Park Rangers.

=== January ===
The first game of the year away against Stoke City ended in a goalless draw. Ipswich, however, found a win in the third round FA Cup against AFC Wimbledon, winning 3–1. Ipswich's form appeared to begin to improve, with a 2–1 home win against Sunderland on 13 January 2024, and a massive 1–1 draw at the King Power Stadium on 22 January to help maintain second place. They then suffered a shock defeat in the fourth round of the FA Cup, losing 2–1 at home to Maidstone United of the sixth tier of English football.

=== February ===
Ipswich's stuttering form in the Championship continued until early February, with a 3–2 away loss against Preston and a 2–2 draw at home to West Brom, dropping to 4th in the table. However, this was put into a stop with four successive victories; with away wins against Millwall and Swansea with scorelines of 0–4 and 1–2 respectively and home wins against Rotherham and Birmingham on scorelines of 4–3 and 3–1 respectively, climbing back to 3rd place.

=== March ===
The campaign in March was excellent, securing a 0–2 away win vs Plymouth and a 3–2 home win over Bristol City. However, Ipswich lost to Cardiff City 2–1 with 2 stoppage time goals pushing them to a defeat. Ipswich then grabbed their biggest home win and biggest win of the season with a 6–0 win over Sheffield Wednesday, being just 1 point off of Leeds and Leicester for top spot heading into in the international break. On March 30, Ipswich secured a 0–1 away win against Blackburn, ending the month on top of the Championship after Leeds drew and Leicester lost their last match of the month respectively.

=== April ===
Kieran McKenna’s side started the month strongly with a 3-2 home win over fellow promotion hopefuls Southampton. This followed with a 1-0 reverse at home in the East Anglian Derby against Norwich City before a run of draws. Ipswich were held by Watford 0-0 and then Middlesbrough 1-1 at home. On the 14th April Kieran McKenna was awarded the Sky Bet Championship Manager of the Season. Ipswich then drew with Hull City 3-3 on the road where George Hirst made his return to the starting 11 from injury with the first goal of the game. The month ended with a 2-1 away win at Coventry City leaving Ipswich needing only a point from their final game of the season to secure back to back promotions and a return to Premier League Football.

=== May ===
The month sparked jubilation in the town of Ipswich as Ipswich Town secured Promotion to the Premier League after a 2-0 home win over Huddersfield Town. This made Ipswich Town the first team to secure back-to-back promotions from League One to the Championship and to the Premier League since Southampton in 2012, the fifth team to earn this honor, and it also ended their 22-year-long wait to the Premier League. The club ended their season in 2nd place with 96 points, one point below Championship winners Leicester City, and set a record for the most points by a team in an English second tier campaign that didn't win the title.

== First-team squad ==
As of 30 June 2024

No.	Player	Position	Nationality	Place of birth	Date of birth (age)	Signed from	Date signed	Fee	Contract end
Goalkeepers
1	Christian Walton	GK	(England)	Wadebridge	9 November 1995 (aged 28)	Brighton & Hove Albion	19 January 2022	Undisclosed	30 June 2024
13	Cieran Slicker	GK	(Scotland)	(England) Oldham	15 September 2002 (aged 21)	Manchester City	8 July 2023	Undisclosed	30 June 2026
31	Václav Hladký	GK	(Czech Republic)	Brno	14 November 1990 (aged 33)	Salford City	1 July 2021	Undisclosed	30 June 2024
32	Nick Hayes	GK	(England)	Clacton-on-Sea	10 April 1999 (aged 25)	Hemel Hempstead Town	31 January 2022	Undisclosed	30 June 2024
Defenders
2	Harry Clarke	RB	(England)	Ipswich	2 March 2001 (aged 23)	Arsenal	19 January 2023	Undisclosed	30 June 2026
3	Leif Davis	LB	(England)	Newcastle upon Tyne	31 December 1999 (aged 24)	Leeds United	25 July 2022	£1,200,000	30 June 2025
4	George Edmundson	CB	(England)	Manchester	15 August 1997 (aged 26)	Rangers	27 July 2021	£875,000	30 June 2025
6	Luke Woolfenden	CB	(England)	Ipswich	21 October 1998 (aged 25)	Academy	1 July 2017	—N/a	30 June 2025
15	Cameron Burgess	CB	(Australia)	(Scotland) Aberdeen	21 October 1995 (aged 28)	Accrington Stanley	15 August 2021	£880,000	30 June 2024
18	Brandon Williams	LB	(England)	Manchester	3 September 2000 (aged 23)	Manchester United	24 August 2023	Loan	31 May 2024
40	Axel Tuanzebe	CB	(Democratic Republic of the Congo)	Bunia	14 November 1997 (aged 26)	Free agent	8 September 2023	—N/a	30 June 2024
44	Janoi Donacien	CB	(Saint Lucia)	Castries	3 November 1993 (aged 30)	Accrington Stanley	3 January 2019	Undisclosed	30 June 2024
Midfielders
5	Sam Morsy	CM	(Egypt)	(England) Wolverhampton	10 September 1991 (aged 32)	Middlesbrough	31 August 2021	Undisclosed	30 June 2024
12	Dominic Ball	DM	(England)	Welwyn Garden City	2 August 1995 (aged 28)	Queens Park Rangers	1 July 2022	Free transfer	30 June 2024
14	Jack Taylor	CM	(Republic of Ireland)	(England) Hammersmith	23 June 1998 (aged 26)	Peterborough United	26 June 2023	£1,500,000	30 June 2026
20	Omari Hutchinson	AM	(England)	(England) Redhill	29 October 2003 (aged 20)	Chelsea	20 July 2023	Loan	30 June 2024
21	Jeremy Sarmiento	AM	(Ecuador)	(Spain) Madrid	16 June 2002 (aged 22)	Brighton & Hove Albion	3 January 2024	Loan	31 May 2024
25	Massimo Luongo	CM	(Australia)	Sydney	25 September 1992 (aged 31)	Middlesbrough	5 January 2023	Free transfer	30 June 2025
28	Lewis Travis	DM	(England)	Whiston	16 October 1997 (aged 26)	Blackburn Rovers	5 January 2024	Loan	31 May 2024
30	Cameron Humphreys	CM	(England)	Colchester	30 October 2003 (aged 20)	Academy	1 July 2022	—N/a	30 June 2026
Forwards
7	Wes Burns	RW	(Wales)	Cardiff	23 November 1994 (aged 29)	Fleetwood Town	1 July 2021	Undisclosed	30 June 2025
10	Conor Chaplin	SS	(England)	Worthing	16 February 1997 (aged 27)	Barnsley	27 July 2021	£875,000	30 June 2026
11	Marcus Harness	RW	(England)	Coventry	24 February 1996 (aged 28)	Portsmouth	15 July 2022	£700,000	30 June 2025
16	Ali Al-Hamadi	CF	(Iraq)	Maysan Governorate	1 March 2002 (aged 22)	AFC Wimbledon	29 January 2024	£1,000,000	30 June 2028
19	Kayden Jackson	CF	(England)	Bradford	22 February 1994 (aged 30)	Accrington Stanley	9 August 2018	£1,800,000	30 June 2024
23	Sone Aluko	RW	(Nigeria)	(England) Hounslow	19 February 1989 (aged 35)	Reading	6 August 2021	Free transfer	30 June 2024
24	Kieffer Moore	CF	(Wales)	(England) Torquay	8 August 1992 (aged 31)	Bournemouth	1 February 2024	Loan	31 May 2024
27	George Hirst	CF	(England)	Sheffield	15 February 1999 (aged 25)	Leicester City	13 July 2023	Undisclosed	30 June 2027
33	Nathan Broadhead	CF	(Wales)	Bangor	5 April 1998 (aged 26)	Everton	9 January 2023	Undisclosed	30 June 2026
51	Gerrard Buabo	CF	(England)	London	24 May 2005 (aged 19)	Academy	2 November 2022	—N/a	30 June 2025
Out on loan
9	Freddie Ladapo	CF	(England)	Romford	1 February 1993 (aged 31)	Rotherham United	1 July 2022	Free transfer	30 June 2025
18	Gassan Ahadme	CF	(Morocco)	(Spain) Vic	17 November 2000 (aged 23)	Burton Albion	1 September 2022	Undisclosed	30 June 2025
22	Idris El Mizouni	CM	(Tunisia)	(France) Paris	26 September 2000 (aged 23)	Academy	1 July 2019	—N/a	30 June 2024
26	Elkan Baggott	CB	(Indonesia)	(Thailand) Bangkok	23 October 2002 (aged 21)	Academy	28 January 2021	—N/a	30 June 2025
28	Panutche Camará	CM	(Guinea-Bissau)	Canchungo	28 February 1997 (aged 27)	Plymouth Argyle	1 September 2022	£580,000	30 June 2024
—N/a	Corrie Ndaba	CB	(Republic of Ireland)	Dublin	25 December 1999 (aged 24)	Cherry Orchard	1 July 2016	Free transfer	30 June 2025

== First-team coaching staff ==
Position	Name
Manager	(Northern Ireland) Kieran McKenna
Assistant Manager	(England) Martyn Pert
First-team Coach	(England) Lee Grant
Goalkeeping Coach	(Republic of Ireland) Rene Gilmartin
Director of Performance	(England) Andy Rolls
Head of Strength & Conditioning	(England) Ivan Mukandi
First-team Fitness Coach	(England) Jon Ashton
Head Physiotherapist	(England) Matt Byard
Rehabilitation Physiotherapist	(England) David Smith
Rehabilitation Physiotherapist	(England) James Heaton
Sports Therapist	(England) Alice Gindrod
Rehabilitation Coach	(England) Luke Sewell
Head of Athletic Performance	(England) Matt Allen
Sports Scientist	(England) Kit Barnes
Head of Analysis	(England) Charlie Turnbull
Head of Performance Analysis	(England) Will Stephenson
Performance Analyst	(England) Morgan Howells
Performance Analyst	(England) Judah Davis
Head of Recruitment	(England) Sam Williams
Recruitment Analyst	(England) Alex Hood
Recruitment Analyst	(England) Jacob Ashton
Kit Manager	(England) James Pullen
Assistant Kit Manager	(England) Lee Owen

== Transfers ==
=== In ===
Date	Pos.	Player	Transferred from	Fee	Ref.
25 May 2023	GK	(England) Charlie Binns	Free agent	—N/a	
26 June 2023	CM	(Republic of Ireland) Jack Taylor	(England) Peterborough United	Undisclosed (Note: Fee reported as £1,500,000)	
1 July 2023	GK	(New Zealand) Henry Gray	(New Zealand) Waterside Karori	Undisclosed	
8 July 2023	GK	(Scotland) Cieran Slicker	(England) Manchester City	Undisclosed	
13 July 2023	CF	(England) George Hirst	(England) Leicester City	Undisclosed (Note: Fee reported as £1,500,000)	
8 September 2023	CB	(Democratic Republic of the Congo) Axel Tuanzebe	Free agent	—N/a	
29 January 2024	CF	(Iraq) Ali Al-Hamadi	(England) AFC Wimbledon	Undisclosed (Note: Fee reported as £1,000,000)	

=== Out ===
Date	Pos.	Player	Transferred to	Fee	Ref.
28 June 2023	CM	(England) Rekeem Harper	(England) Burton Albion	Mutual consent	
30 June 2023	DM	(England) Fraser Alexander	(England) Bishop's Stortford	Released	
30 June 2023	CB	(England) Albie Armin	(England) Leiston	Released	
30 June 2023	GK	(England) Joel Coleman	(England) Bolton Wanderers	Released	
30 June 2023	CB	(England) Daniel Cousens	(England) AFC Sudbury	Free transfer	
30 June 2023	CF	(England) Harley Curtis	Free agent	Released	
30 June 2023	CM	(England) Alfie Cutbush	Free agent	Released	
30 June 2023	CM	(Republic of Ireland) Matt Healy	(Belgium) Francs Borains	Released	
30 June 2023	LB	(England) Max Hudson	Free agent	Released	
30 June 2023	CB	(England) Brooklyn Kabongolo	Free agent	Released	
30 June 2023	CB	(Republic of Ireland) Richard Keogh	(England) Wycombe Wanderers	Released	
30 June 2023	LB	(England) Matt Penney	Free agent	Released	
30 June 2023	GK	(Wales) Lewis Ridd	(England) Derby County	Released	
30 June 2023	RB	(England) Kane Vincent-Young	(England) Wycombe Wanderers	Released	
21 July 2023	CF	(England) Joe Pigott	(England) Leyton Orient	Mutual consent	
24 August 2023	LB	(Jamaica) Greg Leigh	(England) Oxford United	Undisclosed	
18 September 2023	CM	(England) Tawanda Chirewa	(England) Wolverhampton Wanderers	Compensation	
1 January 2024	CF	(Australia) Tete Yengi	(Scotland) Livingston	Undisclosed	
12 January 2024	LW	(England) Kyle Edwards	(England) Oxford United	Mutual consent	
2 February 2024	CB	(England) Zak Bradshaw	(England) Lincoln City	Free Transfer	
2 February 2024	CM	(Wales) Lee Evans	(England) Portsmouth	Mutual Consent	

=== Loaned in ===
Date from	Pos.	Player	Loaned from	Date to	Ref.
20 July 2023	AM	(Jamaica) Omari Hutchinson	(England) Chelsea	End of season	
24 August 2023	LB	(England) Brandon Williams	(England) Manchester United	End of season	
31 August 2023	CF	(England) Dane Scarlett	(England) Tottenham Hotspur	27 December 2023 (Note: On 27 December, Scarlett was recalled back to Tottenham Hotspur.)	
3 January 2024	AM	(Ecuador) Jeremy Sarmiento	(England) Brighton & Hove Albion	End of season	
5 January 2024	DM	(England) Lewis Travis	(England) Blackburn Rovers	End of season	
1 February 2024	CF	(Wales) Kieffer Moore	(England) Bournemouth	End of season	

=== Loaned out ===
Date from	Pos.	Player	Loaned to	Date to	Ref.
1 July 2023	CB	(Republic of Ireland) Corrie Ndaba	(Scotland) Kilmarnock	End of season	
1 July 2023	CF	(Morocco) Gassan Ahadme	(England) Cambridge United	End of season	
5 July 2023	GK	(England) Danny Cullum	(England) Bury Town	End of season	
5 July 2023	CM	(Tunisia) Idris El Mizouni	(England) Leyton Orient	End of season	
18 July 2023	CM	(Guinea-Bissau) Panutche Camará	(England) Charlton Athletic	End of season	
31 July 2023	CB	(Northern Ireland) Cameron Stewart	(Scotland) Cove Rangers	End of season	
26 August 2023	CM	(England) Jack Manly	(England) Leiston	End of season	
1 September 2023	LM	(England) Kyle Edwards	(England) Oxford United	12 January 2024 (Note: On 12 January, Edwards returned from his loan spell at Oxford United and left the club by mutual consent.)	
7 October 2023	GK	(England) Nick Hayes	(England) Southend United	14 October 2023	
19 January 2024	CF	(England) Freddie Ladapo	(England) Charlton Athletic	End of season	
1 February 2024	CB	(Indonesia) Elkan Baggott	(England) Bristol Rovers	End of season	
24 February 2024	AM	(England) Osman Foyo	(England) Welling United	23 March 2024	

=== New contracts ===
==== Coaching staff ====
Date signed	Nationality	Name	Contract length	Expiry	Ref.
13 September 2023	(England)	Martyn Pert	4 years	2027	
13 September 2023	(England)	Lee Grant	4 years	2027	
13 September 2023	(England)	Charlie Turnbull	4 years	2027	
13 September 2023	(Republic of Ireland)	Rene Gilmartin	4 years	2027	

==== First-team ====
Date signed	Number	Position	Nationality	Name	Contract length	Expiry	Ref.
24 January 2024	25	CM	(Australia)	Massimo Luongo	1 year	2025	

==== Academy ====
Date signed	Number	Pos.	Nationality	Player	Contract length	Expiry	Ref.
11 July 2022	–	GK	(Scotland)	Woody Williamson	Two years	2025	
11 July 2022	–	GK	(Poland)	Antoni Bort	Six months	2024	

== Pre-season and friendlies ==
On 5 June, Ipswich Town announced their first two pre-season friendlies, against Cambridge United and Stevenage. A day later, a third fixture was added, against Felixstowe & Walton United. On June 20, a fourth fixture was confirmed, against Preston North End. A day later, a further addition to the pre-season calendar, against Maidenhead United was added.

Win Draw Loss Fixtures

1 July 2023 Friendly	Felixstowe & Walton United	0–6	Ipswich Town	Felixstowe
13:00 BST		Report	Ladapo (x2); Aluko; Edwards; Jackson; Camará	Stadium: Dellwood Avenue

7 July 2023 Friendly	Maidenhead United	1–2	Ipswich Town	Needham Market
19:45 BST	McCoulsky	Report	Harness; Ladapo	Stadium: Bloomfields

15 July 2023 Friendly	Spartak Trnava	1–2	Ipswich Town	Maria Enzersdorf, Austria
11:00 CEST	Djuricin 56'	Report	Aluko 4'; Harness 46'	Stadium: Motion invest Arena

15 July 2023 Friendly	Admira Wacker	2–2	Ipswich Town	Maria Enzersdorf, Austria
16:00 CEST	Keckeisen 38'; Young 41'	Report	Ladapo 39'; Chaplin 72'	Stadium: Motion invest Arena

19 July 2023 Friendly	Preston North End	1–2	Ipswich Town	Preston
19:00 BST	Rodriguez-Gentile 81'	Report	Chaplin 34'; Hirst 78'	Stadium: Deepdale

22 July 2023 Friendly	Cambridge United	2–1	Ipswich Town	Cambridge
12:00 BST	Janneh 29'; Morrison 90'	Report	Davis 2'	Stadium: Abbey Stadium; Attendance: 2,936 (517 Town fans)

22 July 2023 Friendly	Stevenage	2–1	Ipswich Town	Stevenage
15:00 BST	Reid 6'; Thompson 49'	Report	Hirst 68'	Stadium: The Lamex Stadium

25 July 2023 Friendly	Luton Town	1–1	Ipswich Town	Colchester
19:30 BST	Morris 75' (pen.)	Report	Burns 13'	Stadium: Colchester Community Stadium

28 July 2023 Innsbruck Cup	RB Leipzig	0–1	Ipswich Town	Innsbruck, Austria
14:30 CEST		Report	Hirst 50'	Stadium: Tivoli Stadion Tirol

28 July 2023 Innsbruck Cup	Werder Bremen	1–1	Ipswich Town	Innsbruck, Austria
17:00 CEST	Kownacki 12'	Report	Leigh 54'	Stadium: Tivoli Stadion Tirol

== Competitions ==
=== Overall record ===
Competition	First match	Last match	Starting round	Final position	Record							
Competition	First match	Last match	Starting round	Final position	Pld	W	D	L	GF	GA	GD	Win %
Championship	6 August 2023	4 May 2024	Matchday 1	2nd	46	28	12	6	92	57	+35	60.87
FA Cup	6 January 2024	27 January 2024	Third round	Fourth round	2	1	0	1	4	3	+1	50.00
EFL Cup	9 August 2023	1 November 2023	First round	Fourth round	4	2	1	1	8	7	+1	50.00
Total					52	31	13	8	104	67	+37	59.62

Source: Soccerway

=== Championship ===
==== League table ====
Pos	Team	Pld	W	D	L	GF	GA	GD	Pts	Promotion, qualification or relegation
1	Leicester City (C, P)	46	31	4	11	89	41	+48	97	Promoted to the Premier League
2	Ipswich Town (P)	46	28	12	6	92	57	+35	96	Promoted to the Premier League
3	Leeds United	46	27	9	10	81	43	+38	90	Qualified for the Championship play-offs
4	Southampton (O, P)	46	26	9	11	87	63	+24	87	Qualified for the Championship play-offs
5	West Bromwich Albion	46	21	12	13	70	47	+23	75	Qualified for the Championship play-offs
6	Norwich City	46	21	10	15	79	64	+15	73	Qualified for the Championship play-offs

Source: EFL official website
Rules for classification: 1) Points; 2) Goal difference; 3) Number of goals scored; 4) Head-to-head results; 5) Wins; 6) Away goals; 7) Penalty points (sec 9.5); 8) Number of 12-point sending off offences; 9) Play-off (only if needed to determine promotion/relegation)
(C) Champions; (O) Play-off winners; (P) Promoted

==== Results summary ====
Overall								Home						Away					
Pld	W	D	L	GF	GA	GD	Pts	W	D	L	GF	GA	GD	W	D	L	GF	GA	GD
46	28	12	6	92	57	+35	96	16	6	1	59	32	+27	12	6	5	33	25	+8

Source: Soccerway

==== Results by round ====
Round	1	2	3	4	5	6	7	8	9	10	11	13	14	15	12^{1}	16	17	18	19	20	21	22	23	24	25	26	27	28	30	31	32	33	29^{2}	34	35	36	37	38	39	40	41	42	43	45	44^{3}	46
Ground	A	H	A	H	H	A	A	H	A	H	H	A	H	A	A	H	A	H	H	A	A	H	A	H	H	A	H	A	A	H	A	A	H	H	A	H	A	H	A	H	A	H	H	A	A	H
Result	W	W	W	L	W	W	W	W	D	W	W	W	W	D	D	W	L	W	W	W	W	D	L	D	D	D	W	D	L	D	W	W	W	W	W	W	L	W	W	W	L	D	D	D	W	W
Position	4	1	1	6	2	3	3	2	2	2	2	2	2	2	2	2	2	2	2	2	2	2	2	2	2	2	2	2	4	4	4	4	3	3	2	2	3	3	1	1	2	2	1	3	2	2

Source: Soccerway
A = Away; H = Home; W = Win; D = Draw; L = Loss
Notes:
- ^{1} Matchday 12 (vs Rotherham United) was postponed due to Storm Babet.
- ^{2} Matchday 29 (vs Rotherham United) was postponed due to FA Cup progression.
- ^{3} Matchday 44 (vs Coventry City) was postponed due to Coventry's FA Cup progression.

==== Matches ====
On 22 June, the EFL Championship fixtures were released.

Win Draw Loss Fixtures

6 August 2023 1	Sunderland	1–2	Ipswich Town	Sunderland
17:00 BST	Hume (yellow card) 32' (yellow-red card) 72'; Ballard (yellow card) 80'; Neil 86'	Report	Burns (yellow card) 35'; Broadhead 45+1'; Hirst 53'; Hladký (yellow card) 56'; Morsy (yellow card) 62'	Stadium: Stadium of Light; Attendance: 44,407; Referee: Sam Barrott
Note: Live on Sky Sports

12 August 2023 2	Ipswich Town	2–0	Stoke City	Ipswich
15:00 BST	Woolfenden 23'; Hladký (yellow card) 51'; Donacien (yellow card) 77'; Jackson 81'; Morsy (yellow card) 89'	Report	Rose (yellow card) 20'	Stadium: Portman Road; Attendance: 29,006; Referee: Josh Smith

19 August 2023 3	Queens Park Rangers	0–1	Ipswich Town	Shepherd's Bush
15:00 BST	Smyth (yellow card) 21'; Chair (yellow card) 51'; Field (yellow card) 55'; Colback (yellow card) 90+8'	Report	Luongo (yellow card) 21'; Chaplin 75'	Stadium: Loftus Road; Attendance: 16,790; Referee: Geoff Eltringham

26 August 2023 4	Ipswich Town	3–4	Leeds United	Ipswich
15:00 BST	Rodon 7' (o.g.); Morsy (yellow card) 45+5'; Broadhead 45+7'; Luongo (yellow card) 56'; Woolfenden (yellow card) 87'; Chaplin 90+7'	Report	Rutter 10'; Gnonto 14'; Piroe 19'; Shackleton (yellow card) 52'; Ayling (yellow card) 71'; Sinisterra 75'	Stadium: Portman Road; Attendance: 29,606; Referee: Bobby Madley

2 September 2023 5	Ipswich Town	3–2	Cardiff City	Ipswich
15:00 BST	Clarke (yellow card) 33'; Broadhead 59', (yellow card) 90+6'; Burns (yellow card) 64'; Ladapo 68', 78'; Williams (yellow card) 90'	Report	Ramsey 30'; Tanner (yellow card) 38'; Ralls 52'; Ng (yellow card) 65'; Panzo (yellow card) 87'	Stadium: Portman Road; Attendance: 28,011; Referee: Gavin Ward

16 September 2023 6	Sheffield Wednesday	0–1	Ipswich Town	Owlerton
15:00 BST	Famewo (yellow card) 11'; Paterson (yellow card) 46'; Hendrick (yellow card) 66'	Report	Morsy (yellow card) 9'; Burns (yellow card) 41'; Chaplin 45', (yellow card) 90+4'; Hladký (yellow card) 56'	Stadium: Hillsborough Stadium; Attendance: 25,938; Referee: James Linington

19 September 2023 7	Southampton	0–1	Ipswich Town	Southampton
19:45 BST	Harwood-Bellis (yellow card) 59'; Adams (yellow card) 77'	Report	Hutchinson 30'; Williams (yellow card) 38'; Taylor (yellow card) 52'	Stadium: St Mary's Stadium; Attendance: 27,265; Referee: Josh Smith

23 September 2023 8	Ipswich Town	4–3	Blackburn Rovers	Ipswich
15:00 BST	Clarke 4'; Broadhead 18'; Hirst 25'; Morsy (yellow card) 48'; Hirst (yellow card) 59'; Chaplin (yellow card) 74'; Luongo 79'	Report	Sigurðsson 9', (yellow card) 40'; Moran (yellow card) 31'; Clarke 52' (o.g.); Carter (yellow card) 62'; Szmodics 65'; Travis (yellow card) 72'	Stadium: Portman Road; Attendance: 28,792; Referee: Keith Stroud

30 September 2023 9	Huddersfield Town	1–1	Ipswich Town	Huddersfield
15:00 BST	Nakayama (yellow card) 5'; Thomas (yellow card) 35'; Burgzorg 61'	Report	Burgess (yellow card) 20'; Burns (yellow card) 35'; Davis (yellow card) 52'; Williams 87'	Stadium: John Smith's Stadium; Attendance: 20,000; Referee: Geoff Eltringham

3 October 2023 10	Ipswich Town	3–0	Hull City	Ipswich
19:45 BST	Burns 5'; Chaplin 41'; Harness 65'	Report		Stadium: Portman Road; Attendance: 27,070; Referee: Matt Donohue

7 October 2023 11	Ipswich Town	4–2	Preston North End	Ipswich
15:00 BST	Chaplin 18'; Williams 35'; Broadhead 45+1'; Jackson 78'	Report	Ledson (yellow card) 8'; Lindsay (yellow card) 22'; Frøkjær-Jensen 27'; Browne (yellow card) 31'; Whiteman 52'	Stadium: Portman Road; Attendance: 29,018; Referee: David Webb

25 October 2023 13	Bristol City	0–1	Ipswich Town	Bristol
19:45 BST		Report	Jackson (yellow card) 14'; Broadhead 16'; Morsy (yellow card) 42'; Davis (yellow card) 69'; Hirst (yellow card) 77'	Stadium: Ashton Gate Stadium; Attendance: 22,784; Referee: Tom Nield

28 October 2023 14	Ipswich Town	3–2	Plymouth Argyle	Ipswich
15:00 BST	Luongo (yellow card) 32'; Mumba 45+1' (o.g.); Hirst 54'; Woolfenden (yellow card) 66'; Williams (yellow card) 68'; Edmundson (yellow card) 74'; Harness 86'	Report	Whittaker 7'; Miller (yellow card) 28'; Mumba (yellow card) 62'; Edwards 90+1'	Stadium: Portman Road; Attendance: 29,027; Referee: Gavin Ward

4 November 2023 15	Birmingham City	2–2	Ipswich Town	Birmingham
15:00 BST	Stansfield 13'; Aiwu (yellow card) 28'; Burgess 51' (o.g.); Drameh (yellow card) 49'; Bielik (yellow card) 82'	Report	Burgess (yellow card) 25'; Harness 79', 89'	Stadium: St Andrew's; Attendance: 20,940; Referee: Leigh Doughty

7 November 2023 12	Rotherham United	2–2	Ipswich Town	Rotherham
20:00 BST	Nombe 4'; Revan (yellow card) 76'; Tiéhi 90+1'	Report	Morsy 19', (yellow card) 82'; Taylor 87'	Stadium: New York Stadium; Attendance: 10,800; Referee: Graham Scott
Note: The match was originally scheduled for 20 October 2023, but was postponed due to Storm Babet.

11 November 2023 16	Ipswich Town	3–2	Swansea City	Ipswich
15:00 GMT	Taylor 17'; Chaplin 22', (yellow card) 26'; Hirst 53' (pen.); Scarlett (yellow card) 81'	Report	Fulton 7'; Cullen (yellow card) 26' (yellow-red card) 69'; Walsh (yellow card) 86'; Lowe 90+5'	Stadium: Portman Road; Attendance: 28,925; Referee: Sunny Singh Gill

25 November 2023 17	West Bromwich Albion	2–0	Ipswich Town	West Bromwich
17:30 GMT	Furlong 5'; Diangana (yellow card) 39', (goal) 47'	Report	Williams (yellow card) 60'; Morsy (yellow card) 75'	Stadium: Hawthorns; Attendance: 24,001; Referee: Gavin Ward
Note: Live on Sky Sports

29 November 2023 18	Ipswich Town	3–1	Millwall	Ipswich
20:00 GMT	Chaplin 5'; Luongo 12', (yellow card) 25'; Broadhead 39', (yellow card) 52'	Report	Flemming (yellow card) 37'; Honeyman (yellow card) 46'; De Norre (yellow card) 54'; Nisbet 78'	Stadium: Portman Road; Attendance: 27,702; Referee: Thomas Bramall
Note: Live on Sky Sports

2 December 2023 19	Ipswich Town	2–1	Coventry City	Ipswich
15:00 GMT	Hirst 6'; Luongo (yellow card) 39'; Burns 41'; Williams (yellow card) 89'	Report	Godden (penalty missed) 73'; Sakamoto (yellow card) 79'; Williams 90+6' (o.g.)	Stadium: Portman Road; Attendance: 29,378; Referee: Andrew Kitchen

9 December 2023 20	Middlesbrough	0–2	Ipswich Town	Middlesbrough
15:00 GMT	Crooks (yellow card) 51'	Report	Chaplin 36'; Woolfenden (yellow card) 63'; Hutchinson 67'; Ball (yellow card) 90'; Morsy (yellow card) 90+5'	Stadium: Riverside Stadium; Attendance: 27,960; Referee: Dean Whitestone

12 December 2023 21	Watford	1–2	Ipswich Town	Watford
19:45 GMT	Asprilla 12'; Kayembe (yellow card) 46'; Bayo (yellow card) 84'	Report	Hirst 24', (yellow card) 45'; Chaplin (yellow card) 39'; Luongo (yellow card) 53'; Morsy 80'; Hutchinson (yellow card) 89'	Stadium: Vicarage Road; Attendance: 18,109; Referee: Darren England

16 December 2023 22	Ipswich Town	2–2	Norwich City	Ipswich
12:30 GMT	Broadhead 34'; Burns 60', (yellow card) 77'; Woolfenden (yellow card) 90+6'	Report	Rowe 40', 49'	Stadium: Portman Road; Attendance: 29,611; Referee: Josh Smith

23 December 2023 23	Leeds United	4–0	Ipswich Town	Leeds
12:30 GMT	Struijk 8'; Davis 25' (o.g.); James (yellow card) 34'; Summerville 45' (pen.); Piroe 52'	Report	Clarke (yellow card) 29'; Tuanzebe (yellow card) 60'; Broadhead (yellow card) 65'; Ball (yellow card) 90+1'	Stadium: Elland Road; Attendance: 36,758; Referee: Stephen Martin

26 December 2023 24	Ipswich Town	1–1	Leicester City	Ipswich
19:45 GMT	Harness (yellow card) 61'; Vestergaard 90+3' (o.g.)	Report	Mavididi 25'; Ndidi (yellow card) 54'; Pereira (yellow card) 59'	Stadium: Portman Road; Attendance: 29,410; Referee: Sam Barrott

29 December 2023 25	Ipswich Town	0–0	Queens Park Rangers	Ipswich
19:45 GMT	Chaplin (yellow card) 35'; Woolfenden (yellow card) 52'; Harness (yellow card) 86'	Report	Begović (yellow card) 83'; Larkeche (yellow card) 90'	Stadium: Portman Road; Attendance: 29,100; Referee: David Webb

1 January 2024 26	Stoke City	0–0	Ipswich Town	Stoke-on-Trent
15:00 GMT	Thompson (yellow card) 7' (yellow-red card) 67'; Baker (yellow card) 51'	Report	Morsy (yellow card) 33'; Clarke (yellow card) 89'	Stadium: bet365 Stadium; Attendance: 23,121; Referee: James Bell

13 January 2024 27	Ipswich Town	2–1	Sunderland	Ipswich
17:30 GMT	Clarke (yellow card) 24'; Jackson 33'; Taylor (yellow card) 52'; Edmundson (yellow card) 54'; Burns (yellow card) 60'; Chaplin 75'; Sarmiento (yellow card) 85'	Report	Clarke 26'; Ba (yellow card) 55'; Hume (yellow card) 83'	Stadium: Portman Road; Attendance: 29,291; Referee: Sam Allison
Note: The match was originally scheduled for a 15:00 kick-off, but was pushed back for TV coverage.

22 January 2024 28	Leicester City	1–1	Ipswich Town	Leicester
20:00 GMT	Davis 31' (o.g.); Pereira (yellow card) 84'	Report	Travis (yellow card) 59'; Luongo (yellow card) 65'; Clarke (yellow card) 69'; Sarmiento 89'	Stadium: King Power Stadium; Attendance: 31,794; Referee: Josh Smith
Note: The match was originally scheduled for 20 January 2024, but was moved for TV coverage.

3 February 2024 30	Preston North End	3–2	Ipswich Town	Preston
15:00 GMT	Keane 5', 39'; Edmundson 8' (o.g.)	Report	Moore 75', 87'	Stadium: Deepdale; Attendance: 17,313; Referee: Graham Scott

10 February 2024 31	Ipswich Town	2–2	West Bromwich Albion	Ipswich
12:30 GMT	Morsy (yellow card) 30'; Broadhead 46'; Clarke (yellow card) 49'; Hutchinson 90+3'	Report	Fellows 18'; Furlong (yellow card) 47'; Weimann (yellow card) 56'; Chalobah (yellow card) 66'; Swift 76'	Stadium: Portman Road; Attendance: 29,016; Referee: David Coote
Note: Fixture was originally set for a 15:00 kick-off, but was pushed forward for live Sky Sports coverage.

14 February 2024 32	Millwall	0–4	Ipswich Town	Bermondsey
20:00 GMT	McNamara (yellow card) 60'; Saville (yellow card) 84'; Leonard (yellow card) 88'	Report	Broadhead 24'; Harding 32' (o.g.); Moore 46'; Davis (yellow card) 58'; Al-Hamadi 90+3' (pen.)	Stadium: The Den; Attendance: 15,890; Referee: Sam Barrott
Note: Fixture was originally set for a 19:45 kick-off, but was pushed back for live Sky Sports coverage.

17 February 2024 33	Swansea City	1–2	Ipswich Town	Landore
15:00 GMT	Yates 31'; Naughton (yellow card) 55'	Report	Broadhead 13'; Davis (yellow card) 30'; Chaplin 35'	Stadium: Swansea.com Stadium; Attendance: 16,647; Referee: John Busby

20 February 2024 29	Ipswich Town	4–3	Rotherham United	Ipswich
15:00 GMT	Burns 9', 29'; Moore 14'; Hutchinson 90+5'; Tuanzebe (yellow card) 90+9'	Report	Eaves 2'; Odoffin (yellow card) 8', (goal) 60'; Peltier (yellow card) 62'; Cafú 90+4' (pen.)	Stadium: Portman Road; Attendance: 28,026; Referee: Keith Stroud
Note: Fixture was originally scheduled for 27 January, but was postponed due to Ipswich's FA Cup involvement.

24 February 2024 34	Ipswich Town	3–1	Birmingham City	Ipswich
15:00 GMT	Chaplin 31'; Burgess (yellow card) 43'; Luongo (yellow card) 50'; Morsy (yellow card) 54'; Sarmiento 81'; Hutchinson 90+2'	Report	James 45+1'; Šunjić (yellow card) 75'	Stadium: Portman Road; Attendance: 29,363; Referee: Gavin Ward

2 March 2024 35	Plymouth Argyle	0–2	Ipswich Town	Plymouth
15:00 GMT	Galloway (yellow card) 72'	Report	Sarmiento (yellow card) 59'; Galloway 63' (o.g.); Chaplin (yellow card) 71'; Moore 74'; Travis (yellow card) 78'	Stadium: Home Park; Attendance: 16,871; Referee: Josh Smith

5 March 2024 36	Ipswich Town	3–2	Bristol City	Ipswich
20:00 GMT	Al-Hamadi 62', (penalty missed) 86', (yellow card) 90+1'; Chaplin 80'; Davis 89'	Report	Mehmeti 54'; Conway 77'; McCrorie (yellow card) 79'; O'Leary (yellow card) 85'; Pring (yellow card) 90+3'	Stadium: Portman Road; Attendance: 28,001; Referee: David Webb

9 March 2024 37	Cardiff City	2–1	Ipswich Town	Cardiff
12:30 GMT	Wintle 90+5'; O'Dowda 90+10'	Report	Moore 79'; Hladký (yellow card) 89'	Stadium: Cardiff City Stadium; Attendance: 21,771; Referee: Oliver Langford
Note: Fixture was originally set to kick off at 15:00, but was brought forward for live Sky Sports coverage.

16 March 2024 38	Ipswich Town	6–0	Sheffield Wednesday	Ipswich
15:00 GMT	Hutchinson 15', 49', (yellow card) 34'; Burgess 37'; Broadhead 45+1'; Al-Hamadi 80', 90'	Report	Ihiekwe (yellow card) 32'; Vaulks (yellow card) 86'	Stadium: Portman Road; Attendance: 29,325; Referee: Leigh Doughty

29 March 2024 39	Blackburn Rovers	0–1	Ipswich Town	Blackburn
17:30 GMT	Pickering (yellow card) 6'; Dolan (yellow card) 44'	Report	Davis (yellow card) 3'; Chaplin 9'; Luongo (yellow card) 81'; Jackson (yellow card) 84'	Stadium: Ewood Park; Attendance: 18,235; Referee: Stuart Attwell
Note: Fixture was initially scheduled for a 15:00 kick-off, but was moved for live Sky Sports broadcasting.

1 April 2024 40	Ipswich Town	3–2	Southampton	Ipswich
17:30 BST	Davis 13'; Morsy (yellow card) 16'; Broadhead 68'; Taylor (yellow card) 70'; Sarmiento 90+7'; Chaplin (yellow card) 90+8'	Report	Adams 14'; A. Armstrong 23'; Bree (red card) 85'; Bednarek (yellow card) 90+5'	Stadium: Portman Road; Attendance: 29,393; Referee: Michael Salisbury
Note: Fixture was initially scheduled for a 15:00 kick-off, but was moved for live Sky Sports broadcasting.

6 April 2024 41	Norwich City	1–0	Ipswich Town	Norwich
12:30 BST	Núñez 39'	Report	Tuanzebe (yellow card) 31'	Stadium: Carrow Road; Attendance: 27,001; Referee: Matt Donohue
Note: Fixture was initially scheduled for a 15:00 kick-off, but was moved for live Sky Sports broadcast.

10 April 2024 42	Ipswich Town	0–0	Watford	Ipswich
19:45 BST	Clarke (yellow card) 33'; Moore (yellow card) 57'	Report	Porteous (yellow card) 67'	Stadium: Portman Road; Attendance: 28,589; Referee: Sam Barrott

13 April 2024 43	Ipswich Town	1–1	Middlesbrough	Ipswich
15:00 BST	Luongo 30', (yellow card) 49'; Travis (yellow card) 90+5'	Report	Latte Lath 20'; Howson (yellow card) 57'; Ayling (yellow card) 90+3'	Stadium: Portman Road; Attendance: 28,771; Referee: Sam Allison

27 April 2024 45	Hull City	3–3	Ipswich Town	Kingston upon Hull
20:00 BST	Tufan 40'; Carvalho (yellow card) 45+4'; Delap 56'; Ohio 87'	Report	Hirst 19'; Tuanzebe (yellow card) 36'; Burns (yellow card) 45'; Hutchinson 45+2', 67'; Luongo (yellow card) 54'	Stadium: MKM Stadium; Attendance: 24,298; Referee: Andrew Kitchen
Note: Fixture was initially scheduled for a 15:00 kick-off, but was moved for live Sky Sports broadcast.

30 April 2024 44	Coventry City	1–2	Ipswich Town	Coventry
20:00 BST	Wright 64'; Eccles (yellow card) 90+12'	Report	Moore 8'; Burgess 69'; Morsy (yellow card) 75'	Stadium: Coventry Building Society Arena; Attendance: 26,457; Referee: James Bell/Dean Whitestone*
Note: Fixture was initially scheduled for 20 April, but was postponed due to Coventry's FA Cup involvement. * Referee James Bell was injured in the 55th minute and was replaced by fourth official Dean Whitestone.

4 May 2024 46	Ipswich Town	2–0	Huddersfield Town	Ipswich
12:30 BST	Burns 27'; Hutchinson 48', (yellow card) 86'	Report	Matos (yellow card) 77'	Stadium: Portman Road; Attendance: 29,011; Referee: Simon Hooper

=== FA Cup ===
Ipswich were drawn away to AFC Wimbledon in the third round. They were then drawn at home to Maidstone United, the lowest-ranked team remaining in the competition, in the fourth round.

Win Draw Loss Fixtures

6 January 2024 Third round	AFC Wimbledon	1–3	Ipswich Town	Wimbledon
12:30 GMT	Reeves 17' (pen.); Pell (yellow card) 26' (yellow-red card) 59'	Report	Davison 8' (o.g.); Harness (yellow card) 33'; Tuanzebe 40', (yellow card) 70'; Edmundson (yellow card) 55'; Taylor 90'	Stadium: Plough Lane; Attendance: 8,595; Referee: Matt Donohue

27 January 2024 Fourth round	Ipswich Town	1–2	Maidstone United	Ipswich
12:30 GMT	Sarmiento 56'; Edmundson (yellow card) 76'	Report	Reynolds 43'; Ezennolim (yellow card) 43'; Hoyte (yellow card) 58'; Corne 66'	Stadium: Portman Road; Attendance: 27,273; Referee: Anthony Taylor

=== EFL Cup ===
Ipswich were drawn at home to Bristol Rovers in the first round. They were then drawn away to Reading in the second round, at home to Wolverhampton Wanderers in the third round, and at home to Fulham in the fourth round.

Win Draw Loss Fixtures

9 August 2023 First round	Ipswich Town	2–0	Bristol Rovers	Ipswich
19:45 BST	Taylor 12'; Hutchinson (yellow card) 54'; Aluko 76'	Report		Stadium: Portman Road; Attendance: 15,047; Referee: David Rock

29 August 2023 Second round	Reading	2–2 (1–3 p)	Ipswich Town	Reading
19:45 BST	Williams 2' (o.g.); Craig (yellow card) 76'; Ehibhatiomhan 87'; McIntyre (yellow card) 90+6'	Report	Evans (yellow card) 39'; Humphreys (yellow card) 41', (goal) 45+5'; Ladapo 59'; Edmundson (yellow card) 87'	Stadium: Select Car Leasing Stadium; Attendance: 7,867; Referee: Lewis Smith
	Penalties
	Knibbs (penalty scored); Savage (penalty missed); Vickers (penalty missed); Elliott (penalty missed)		(penalty scored) Chaplin; (penalty scored) Evans; (penalty missed) Aluko; (penalty scored) Taylor

26 September 2023 Third round	Ipswich Town	3–2	Wolverhampton Wanderers	Ipswich
19:45 BST	Evans (yellow card) 16'; Hutchinson 28'; Ladapo 39'; Taylor 58'; Aluko (yellow card) 86'; Baggott (yellow card) 88'	Report	Hwang 4', (yellow card) 45'; Traoré (yellow card) 12'; Toti 15'; Cunha (yellow card) 90+1'	Stadium: Portman Road; Attendance: 20,236; Referee: Sam Barrott

1 November 2023 Fourth round	Ipswich Town	1–3	Fulham	Ipswich
19:45 GMT	Harness (yellow card) 32'; Taylor (yellow card) 38'; Baggott 79'	Report	Wilson 9'; Lukić (yellow card) 38'; Muniz 50'; Cairney 77'; Jiménez (yellow card) 86'; Reed (yellow card) 89'	Stadium: Portman Road; Attendance: 28,221; Referee: Lewis Smith

== Squad statistics ==
=== Appearances and goals ===
No.	Pos	Nat	Player	Total		Championship		FA Cup		EFL Cup	
No.	Pos	Nat	Player	Apps	Goals	Apps	Goals	Apps	Goals	Apps	Goals
Goalkeepers
1	GK	(England) ENG	Christian Walton	4	0	0+1	0	2	0	1	0
13	GK	(Scotland) SCO	Cieran Slicker	2	0	0	0	0	0	2	0
31	GK	(Czech Republic) CZE	Václav Hladký	47	0	46	0	0	0	1	0
Defenders
2	DF	(England) ENG	Harry Clarke	39	1	25+10	1	0+1	0	1+2	0
3	DF	(England) ENG	Leif Davis	44	2	43	2	0+1	0	0	0
4	DF	(England) ENG	George Edmundson	15	0	10	0	2	0	3	0
6	DF	(England) ENG	Luke Woolfenden	42	1	40+1	1	1	0	0	0
15	DF	(Australia) AUS	Cameron Burgess	40	2	38+1	2	0	0	1	0
18	DF	(England) ENG	Brandon Williams	17	2	8+7	2	0	0	2	0
40	DF	(Democratic Republic of the Congo) COD	Axel Tuanzebe	22	1	16+3	0	2	1	1	0
44	DF	(Saint Lucia) LCA	Janoi Donacien	4	0	3	0	0	0	1	0
Midfielders
5	MF	(Egypt) EGY	Sam Morsy	44	2	42	2	2	0	0	0
7	MF	(Wales) WAL	Wes Burns	38	6	31+4	6	0+2	0	0+1	0
11	MF	(Republic of Ireland) IRL	Marcus Harness	39	4	7+27	4	1	0	4	0
12	MF	(England) ENG	Dominic Ball	16	0	1+9	0	1+1	0	4	0
14	MF	(Republic of Ireland) IRL	Jack Taylor	39	4	7+26	2	2	0	4	2
20	MF	(Jamaica) JAM	Omari Hutchinson	50	11	20+24	10	2	0	3+1	1
21	MF	(Ecuador) ECU	Jeremy Sarmiento	22	4	5+15	3	1+1	1	0	0
25	MF	(Australia) AUS	Massimo Luongo	44	3	37+6	3	0	0	0+1	0
28	MF	(England) ENG	Lewis Travis	9	0	4+5	0	0	0	0	0
30	MF	(England) ENG	Cameron Humphreys	8	1	1+1	0	2	0	1+3	1
Forwards
10	FW	(England) ENG	Conor Chaplin	47	13	42+2	13	0+1	0	0+2	0
16	FW	(Iraq) IRQ	Ali Al-Hamadi	14	4	1+13	4	0	0	0	0
19	FW	(England) ENG	Kayden Jackson	33	3	9+20	3	0	0	3+1	0
23	FW	(Nigeria) NGR	Sone Aluko	7	1	0+1	0	1+1	0	1+3	1
24	FW	(Wales) WAL	Kieffer Moore	18	7	14+4	7	0	0	0	0
27	FW	(England) ENG	George Hirst	29	7	24+2	7	0	0	0+3	0
33	FW	(Wales) WAL	Nathan Broadhead	41	13	29+9	13	2	0	0+1	0
51	FW	(England) ENG	Gerrard Buabo	3	0	0+1	0	0+2	0	0	0
Players transferred out during the season
8	MF	(Wales) WAL	Lee Evans	5	0	1+1	0	0	0	3	0
9	FW	(England) ENG	Freddie Ladapo	22	4	2+15	2	1	0	4	2
21	DF	(Jamaica) JAM	Greg Leigh	2	0	0+1	0	0	0	1	0
24	FW	(England) ENG	Dane Scarlett	12	0	0+12	0	0	0	0	0
26	DF	(Indonesia) IDN	Elkan Baggott	4	1	0	0	0	0	3+1	1
32	GK	(England) ENG	Nick Hayes	0	0	0	0	0	0	0	0

Source: Competitions

=== Goalscorers ===
Rank	No.	Pos.	Nat.	Player	Championship	FA Cup	EFL Cup	Total
1	10	FW	(England)	Conor Chaplin	13	0	0	13
1	33	FW	(Wales)	Nathan Broadhead	13	0	0	13
3	20	FW	(Jamaica)	Omari Hutchinson	10	0	1	11
4	27	FW	(England)	George Hirst	7	0	0	7
4	24	FW	(Wales)	Kieffer Moore	7	0	0	7
6	7	MF	(Wales)	Wes Burns	6	0	0	6
7	14	MF	(Republic of Ireland)	Jack Taylor	2	1	2	5
8	11	MF	(Republic of Ireland)	Marcus Harness	4	0	0	4
8	9	FW	(England)	Freddie Ladapo	2	0	2	4
8	16	FW	(Iraq)	Ali Al-Hamadi	4	0	0	4
8	21	MF	(Ecuador)	Jeremy Sarmiento	3	1	0	4
12	19	FW	(England)	Kayden Jackson	3	0	0	3
12	25	MF	(Australia)	Massimo Luongo	3	0	0	3
14	18	DF	(England)	Brandon Williams	2	0	0	2
14	5	MF	(Egypt)	Sam Morsy	2	0	0	2
14	3	DF	(England)	Leif Davis	1	0	0	2
14	15	DF	(Australia)	Cameron Burgess	2	0	0	2
18	2	DF	(England)	Harry Clarke	1	0	0	1
18	6	DF	(England)	Luke Woolfenden	1	0	0	1
18	23	FW	(Nigeria)	Sone Aluko	0	0	1	1
18	26	DF	(Indonesia)	Elkan Baggott	0	0	1	1
18	30	MF	(England)	Cameron Humphreys	0	0	1	1
18	40	DF	(Democratic Republic of the Congo)	Axel Tuanzebe	0	1	0	1
Own goals					5	1	0	6
Totals					91	4	8	103

=== Assists ===
Rank	No.	Pos.	Nat.	Player	Championship	FA Cup	EFL Cup	Total
1	3	DF	(England)	Leif Davis	18	0	0	18
2	10	FW	(England)	Conor Chaplin	8	0	0	8
3	27	FW	(England)	George Hirst	6	0	1	7
4	5	MF	(Egypt)	Sam Morsy	6	0	0	6
5	11	MF	(Republic of Ireland)	Marcus Harness	1	0	3	4
5	19	FW	(England)	Kayden Jackson	3	0	1	4
5	18	FW	(England)	Omari Hutchinson	4	0	0	4
5	7	MF	(Wales)	Wes Burns	4	0	0	4
9	33	FW	(Wales)	Nathan Broadhead	3	0	0	3
9	14	MF	(Republic of Ireland)	Jack Taylor	1	1	1	3
11	4	DF	(England)	George Edmundson	2	0	0	2
12	8	MF	(Wales)	Lee Evans	0	0	1	1
12	15	DF	(Australia)	Cameron Burgess	1	0	0	1
12	30	MF	(England)	Cameron Humphreys	1	0	0	1
12	2	DF	(England)	Harry Clarke	1	0	0	1
12	40	DF	(Democratic Republic of the Congo)	Axel Tuanzebe	1	0	0	1
12	24	FW	(Wales)	Kieffer Moore	1	0	0	1
12	21	MF	(Ecuador)	Jeremy Sarmiento	1	0	0	1
12	6	DF	(England)	Luke Woolfenden	1	0	0	1
Totals					63	1	7	71

=== Clean sheets ===
Rank	No.	Nat.	Player	Championship	FA Cup	EFL Cup	Total
1	31	(Czech Republic)	Václav Hladký	15	0	0	15
2	13	(Scotland)	Cieran Slicker	0	0	1	1
Totals				15	0	1	16

=== Disciplinary record ===
No.	Pos.	Nat.	Player	Championship		FA Cup		EFL Cup		Total	
No.	Pos.	Nat.	Player	Yellow card	Red card	Yellow card	Red card	Yellow card	Red card	Yellow card	Red card
2	DF	(England)	Harry Clarke	7	0	0	0	0	0	7	0
3	DF	(England)	Leif Davis	5	0	0	0	0	0	5	0
4	DF	(England)	George Edmundson	2	0	2	0	1	0	5	0
5	MF	(Egypt)	Sam Morsy	14	0	0	0	0	0	14	0
6	DF	(England)	Luke Woolfenden	5	0	0	0	0	0	5	0
7	MF	(Wales)	Wes Burns	7	0	0	0	0	0	7	0
8	MF	(Wales)	Lee Evans	0	0	0	0	1	0	1	0
10	FW	(England)	Conor Chaplin	7	0	0	0	0	0	7	0
11	MF	(Republic of Ireland)	Marcus Harness	2	0	1	0	1	0	4	0
12	MF	(England)	Dominic Ball	2	0	0	0	0	0	2	0
14	MF	(Republic of Ireland)	Jack Taylor	3	0	0	0	1	0	4	0
15	DF	(Australia)	Cameron Burgess	3	0	0	0	0	0	3	0
16	FW	(Iraq)	Ali Al-Hamadi	1	0	0	0	0	0	1	0
18	DF	(England)	Brandon Williams	5	0	0	0	0	0	5	0
19	FW	(England)	Kayden Jackson	2	0	0	0	0	0	2	0
20	MF	(Jamaica)	Omari Hutchinson	3	0	0	0	1	0	4	0
21	MF	(Ecuador)	Jeremy Sarmiento	2	0	0	0	0	0	2	0
23	MF	(Nigeria)	Sone Aluko	0	0	0	0	1	0	1	0
24	FW	(Wales)	Kieffer Moore	1	0	0	0	0	0	1	0
25	MF	(Australia)	Massimo Luongo	11	0	0	0	0	0	11	0
26	DF	(Indonesia)	Elkan Baggott	0	0	0	0	1	0	1	0
27	FW	(England)	George Hirst	3	0	0	0	0	0	3	0
28	MF	(England)	Lewis Travis	3	0	0	0	0	0	3	0
30	MF	(England)	Cameron Humphreys	0	0	0	0	1	0	1	0
31	GK	(Czech Republic)	Václav Hladký	4	0	0	0	0	0	4	0
33	FW	(Wales)	Nathan Broadhead	3	0	0	0	0	0	3	0
40	DF	(Democratic Republic of the Congo)	Axel Tuanzebe	4	0	1	0	0	0	5	0
44	DF	(Saint Lucia)	Janoi Donacien	1	0	0	0	0	0	1	0
Totals				100	0	4	0	8	0	112	0

=== Captains ===
Rank	No.	Nat.	Player	Championship	FA Cup	EFL Cup	Total	Notes
1	5	(Egypt)	Sam Morsy	42	2	0	44	Club captain
2	8	(Wales)	Lee Evans	1	0	3	4	
3	5	(England)	Conor Chaplin	2	0	0	2	
4	25	(Australia)	Massimo Luongo	1	0	0	1	
4	23	(Nigeria)	Sone Aluko	0	0	1	1	

== Awards ==
=== Player awards ===
Award	Player	Ref.
Player of the Year	(Egypt) Sam Morsy	
Young Player of the Year	(England) Fin Barbrook	
Women's Player of the Year	(England) Sophie Peskett	
Goal of the Season	(Wales) Wes Burns	

=== EFL Championship Manager of the Month ===
Month	Manager	Ref.
September	(Northern Ireland) Kieran McKenna	
March	(Northern Ireland) Kieran McKenna	

=== EFL Championship Player of the Month ===
Month	Player	Ref.
February	(Jamaica) Omari Hutchinson	

=== EFL Championship Goal of the Month ===
Award	Player	Ref.
December	(Wales) Wes Burns	

=== EFL Championship Goal of the Season ===
Player	Ref.
(Wales) Wes Burns	

=== EFL Championship Team of the Season ===
Player	Ref.
(England) Leif Davis	
(Northern Ireland) Kieran McKenna	

=== League Managers Association Awards ===
Award	Winner	Ref.
Manager of the Year	(Northern Ireland) Kieran McKenna	
Championship Manager of the Year	(Northern Ireland) Kieran McKenna	
