= Brandon Williams (footballer) =

English footballer (born 2000)

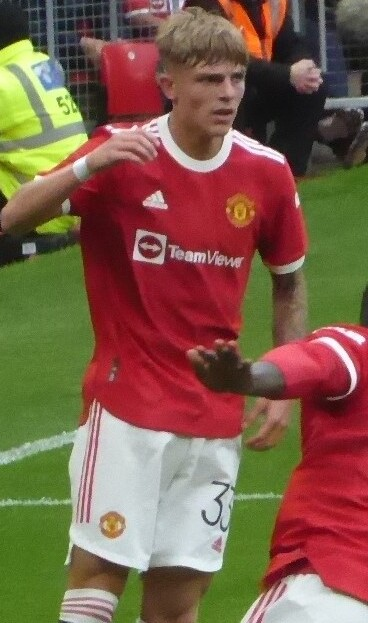
- Williams playing for Manchester United in 2021

Personal information
- Full name: Brandon Paul Brian Williams
- Date of birth: 3 September 2000 (age 26)
- Place of birth: Manchester, England
- Height: 6 ft 0 in (1.82 m)
- Position: Full-back

Team information
- Current team: Rotherham United
- Number: 33

Youth career
- 2008–2019: Manchester United

Senior career*
Years	Team	Apps	(Gls)
2019–2024	Manchester United	21	(1)
2021–2022	→ Norwich City (loan)	26	(0)
2023–2024	→ Ipswich Town (loan)	15	(2)
2025–2026	Hull City	1	(0)
2026–	Rotherham United	2	(0)

International career
2019	England U20	4	(0)
2020	England U21	1	(0)
- * Club domestic league appearances and goals as of 18:11, 31 October 2026 (UTC)

Brandon Paul Brian Williams (born 3 September 2000) is an English professional footballer who plays as a defender for EFL League Two club Rotherham United. Although he mainly plays as a left-back, he has also been used as a right-back.

Williams is a graduate of Manchester United's youth academy and made his first-team debut for the club in September 2019. During his time at the club, he spent time on loan at Norwich City and Ipswich Town, before departing Manchester United in 2024.

He has represented England at under-20 and under-21 levels.

== Early life ==
Williams was born on 3 September 2000 in Manchester. He grew up in the Harpurhey area where he attended nearby secondary school Co-op Academy Manchester.

== Club career ==
=== Manchester United ===
Williams was included in the Manchester United travelling squad for the UEFA Champions League match against Paris Saint-Germain in March 2019, but was not named in the match squad. He made his first-team debut on 25 September as a substitute in an EFL Cup match against Rochdale. He made his first start on 3 October in the UEFA Europa League match against AZ. Williams signed a new long-term contract on 17 October, keeping him at the club until June 2022. He made his Premier League debut on 20 October against Liverpool at Old Trafford as a late substitute. With Ashley Young suspended and Luke Shaw injured, Williams was handed his first league start on 10 November against Brighton & Hove Albion, playing 90 minutes before being substituted for Marcos Rojo in injury time; he was voted Man of the Match by his club's fans. On 24 November, Williams scored his first goal for Manchester United in a 3–3 draw with Sheffield United.

On 4 August 2020, Williams signed a new four-year deal at United, with the option to extend a further year.

On 5 June 2024, Manchester United announced he would leave the club in the summer when his contract expired.

==== Loan to Norwich City ====
On 23 August 2021, Williams joined Norwich City on loan for the duration of the 2021–22 season. On 28 August, Williams made his debut against Leicester City in a 2–1 loss.

==== Loan to Ipswich Town ====
On 24 August 2023, Williams joined Ipswich Town on loan for the 2023–24 season. On 26 August, Williams made his debut for the club against Leeds United in a 4–3 loss. On 30 September, he scored his first goal for Ipswich against Huddersfield Town in a 1–1 draw.

=== Hull City ===
On 15 August 2025, Williams signed a one-year deal with EFL Championship side Hull City as a free agent. He made his debut for the Tigers on 23 August, coming off the bench to replace Joe Gelhardt in a 3–0 home loss to Blackburn Rovers. On 3 February 2026, Williams left the club by mutual consent.

=== Rotherham United ===
On 23 October 2026, following a prolonged trial period since pre-season, Williams joined League Two club Rotherham United on a three-month deal.

== International career ==
On 30 August 2019, Williams received his first England call-up for the under-20 squad ahead of fixtures against the Netherlands and Switzerland. He made his debut during the 0–0 draw with the Netherlands at the stadium of Shrewsbury Town on 5 September.

On 5 October 2020, Williams received his first call-up to the England U21 squad. Williams started and made his debut in a 3–3 draw against Andorra U21 on 7 October.

== Personal life ==
Williams' mother runs a greasy spoon cafe called Snack Attack at Harpurhey Market, with a number of photos and newspaper clippings about his career adorning the walls.

On 20 August 2023, Williams was involved in a traffic collision near Handforth. He was subsequently charged with dangerous driving and driving without insurance. On 14 March 2025, Williams pleaded guilty at Chester Crown Court to dangerous driving and driving without third party insurance.

On 3 May 2024, Williams was disqualified from driving after accumulating 30 points on his licence.

On 23 May 2025, he was sentenced to a 14-month jail term, suspended for two years.

== Career statistics ==
As of 7 November 2026

Appearances and goals by club, season and competition
Club	Season	League			FA Cup		EFL Cup		Europe		Other		Total	
Club	Season	Division	Apps	Goals	Apps	Goals	Apps	Goals	Apps	Goals	Apps	Goals	Apps	Goals
Manchester United U21	2019–20	—	—		—		—		—		1 (Note: Appearance in EFL Trophy)	0	1	0
Manchester United	2019–20	Premier League	17	1	6	0	5	0	8 (Note: Appearances in UEFA Europa League)	0	—		36	1
Manchester United	2020–21	Premier League	4	0	2	0	2	0	6 (Note: Two appearances in UEFA Champions League, four appearances in UEFA Europa League)	0	—		14	0
Manchester United	2022–23	Premier League	0	0	0	0	1	0	0	0	—		1	0
Manchester United	Total		21	1	8	0	8	0	14	0	—		51	1
Norwich City (loan)	2021–22	Premier League	26	0	2	0	1	0	—		—		29	0
Ipswich Town (loan)	2023–24	Championship	15	2	0	0	2	0	—		—		17	2
Hull City	2025–26	Championship	1	0	0	0	—		—		—		1	0
Rotherham United	2026–27	League Two	2	0	1	0	—		—		1	0	4	0
Career total			65	3	11	0	11	0	14	0	2	0	103	3

== Honours ==
Manchester United

- FA Cup runner-up: 2022–23
- UEFA Europa League runner-up: 2020–21

Ipswich Town

- EFL Championship runner-up: 2023–24
