= Gerrard Buabo =

English footballer

Personal information
- Full name: Gerrard Bantu Buabo
- Date of birth: 24 May 2005 (age 21)
- Place of birth: Redbridge, England
- Height: 1.85 m (6 ft 1 in)
- Position: Forward

Team information
- Current team: Ipswich Town
- Number: 51

Youth career
- Ipswich Town

Senior career*
Years	Team	Apps	(Gls)
2021–	Ipswich Town	1	(0)
2021	→ Bury Town (loan)	3	(1)
- * Club domestic league appearances and goals as of 11:30, 7 January 2024 (UTC)

Gerrard Bantu Buabo (born 24 May 2005) is an English professional footballer who plays as a forward for Premier League club Ipswich Town.

== Career ==
Buabo helped the youth-team at Ipswich Town to reach the semi-finals of the FA Youth Cup in the 2020–21 campaign. On 10 September 2021, he joined Bury Town on loan after Ben Chenery's side hit an injury crisis. He made his first-team debut at Ipswich Town on 20 September 2022, coming on as an 86th-minute substitute for Freddie Ladapo in a 2–0 win over Arsenal U21 in the EFL Trophy. He turned professional with the club two months later.

== Career statistics ==
As of match played 27 January 2024

Appearances and goals by club, season and competition
Club	Season	League			FA Cup		EFL Cup		Other		Total	
Club	Season	Division	Apps	Goals	Apps	Goals	Apps	Goals	Apps	Goals	Apps	Goals
Ipswich Town	2021–22	EFL League One	0	0	0	0	0	0	0	0	0	0
Ipswich Town	2022–23	EFL League One	0	0	1	0	0	0	1 (Note: Includes appearance(s) in the EFL Trophy)	0	2	0
Ipswich Town	2023–24	Championship	1	0	2	0	0	0	—		3	0
Ipswich Town	Total		1	0	3	0	0	0	1	0	5	0
Bury Town (loan)	2021–22	Isthmian League North	3	1	—		—		1 (Note: Includes appearance(s) in the FA Trophy)	0	4	1
Career total			4	1	3	0	0	0	2	0	9	1

== Honors ==
Ipswich Town

- EFL Championship runner-up: 2023–24
