= Luke Woolfenden =

English footballer

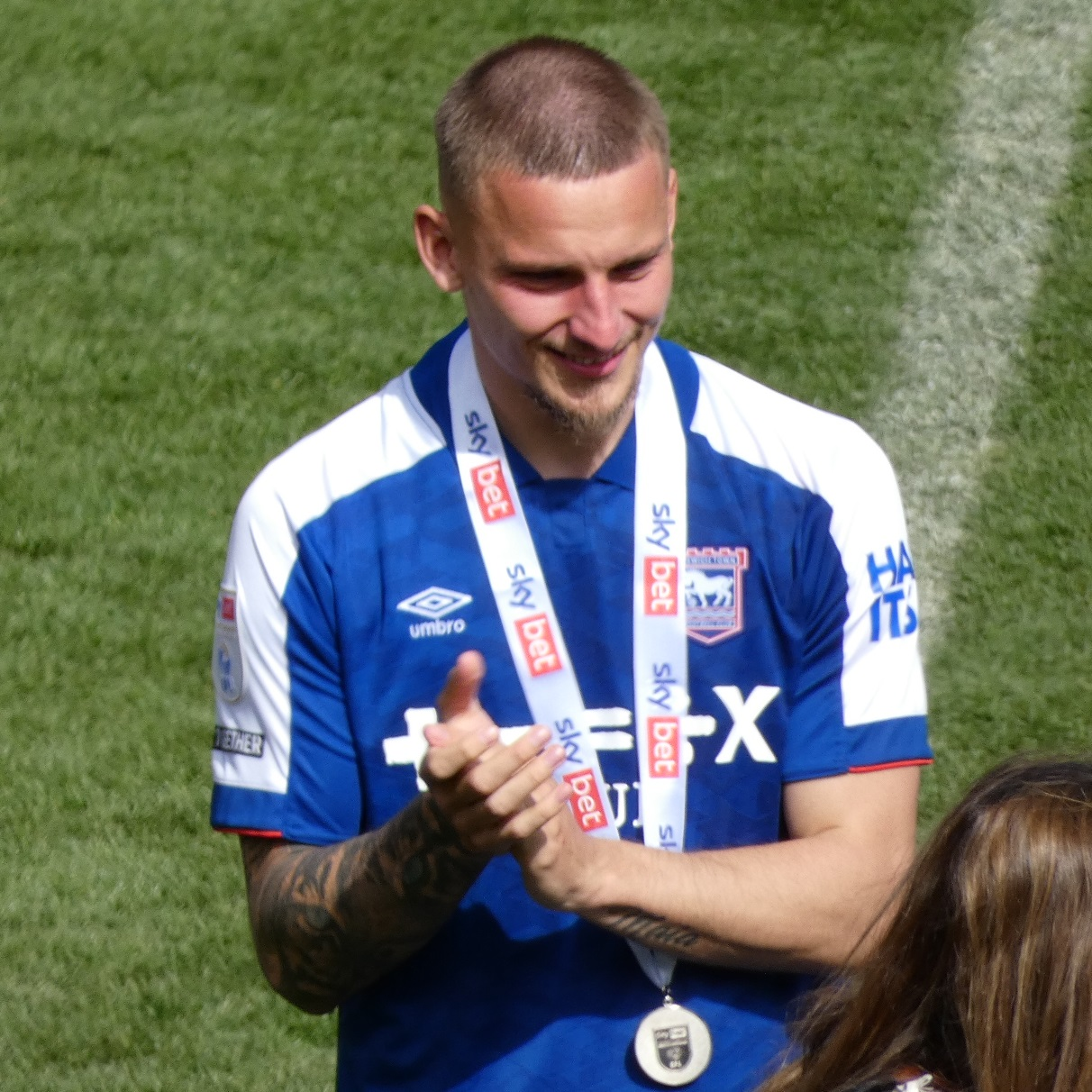
- Woolfenden with Ipswich Town in 2024

Personal information
- Full name: Luke Matthew Woolfenden
- Date of birth: 21 October 1998 (age 28)
- Place of birth: Ipswich, England
- Height: 6 ft 4 in (1.93 m)
- Positions: Centre-back; right-back

Team information
- Current team: Coventry City
- Number: 26

Youth career
- 2009–2017: Ipswich Town

Senior career*
Years	Team	Apps	(Gls)
2017–2025	Ipswich Town	187	(5)
2017–2018	→ Bromley (loan)	20	(1)
2018–2019	→ Swindon Town (loan)	32	(2)
2025–	Coventry City	17	(0)
- * Club domestic league appearances and goals as of 18:50, 18 November 2025 (UTC)

Luke Matthew Woolfenden (born 21 October 1998) is an English professional footballer who plays as a defender for Premier League club Coventry City. Primarily a centre-back, he can also play as a right-back.

Woolfenden is a graduate of the Ipswich Town youth academy, making his senior debut for the club in 2017. He spent time on loan at Bromley during the 2017–2018 season and Swindon Town during the 2018–2019 season.

== Early life ==
Luke Matthew Woolfenden was born in Ipswich, England and grew up in Chantry. He attended East Bergholt High School.

== Club career ==
=== Ipswich Town ===
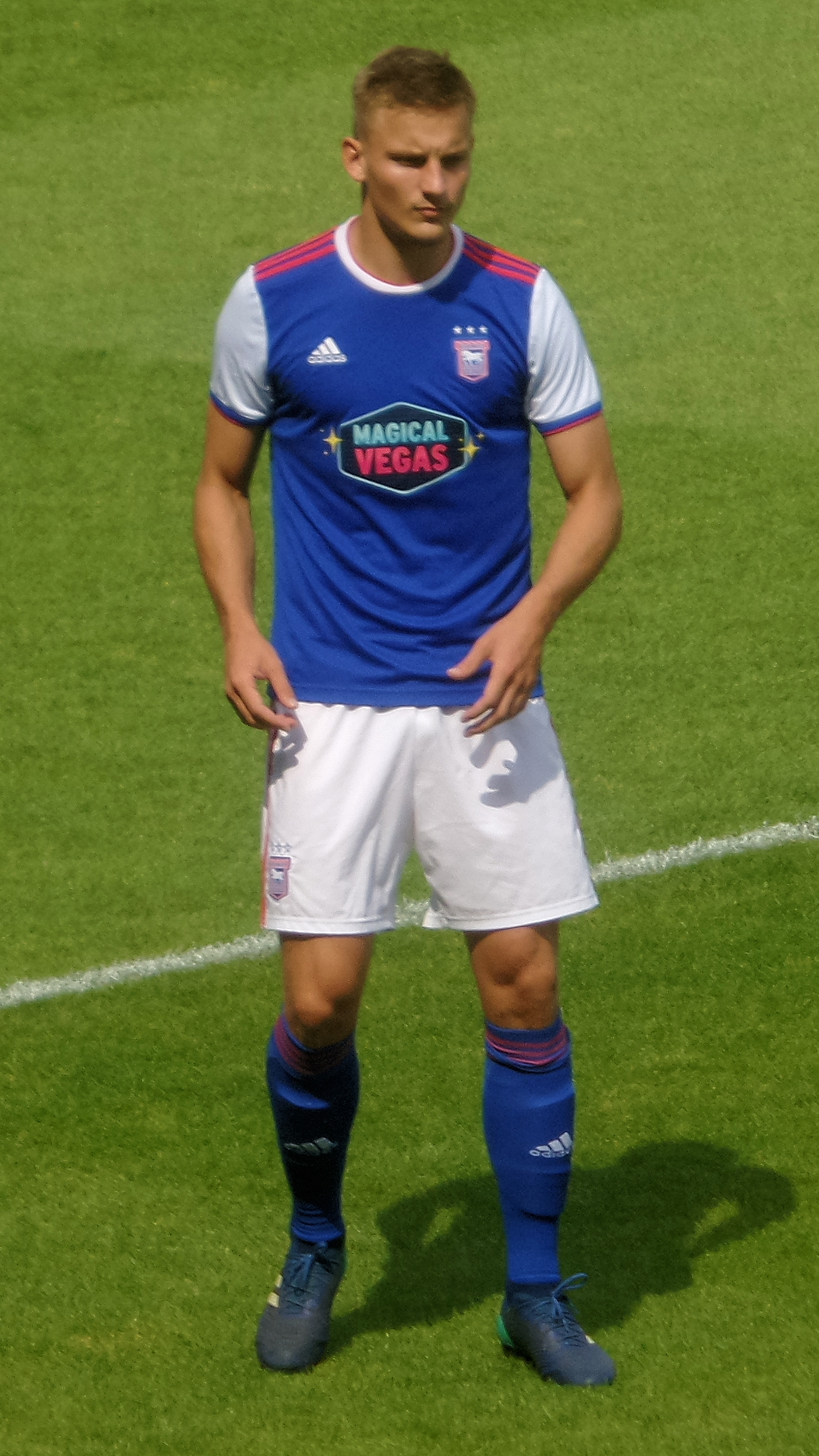
Woolfenden playing for Ipswich Town in 2018

Woolfenden joined the Ipswich Town academy at the age of 11. He became a full academy player with Town in July 2015, signing a two-year scholarship. He signed his first professional contract in June 2017, signing a one-year contract with the option of an additional year extension. He went on to make his full senior debut in a 2–0 win over Luton Town in the League Cup first round on 8 August 2017. In September 2017, Woolfenden signed a new contract with Ipswich, signing a two-year contract with the option of an additional one-year extension.

==== Bromley (loan) ====
In December 2017 he joined Bromley on a month's loan. He made his debut for Bromley against Macclesfield Town on 23 December. On 27 April 2018, Woolfenden was recalled from his loan spell at Bromley. He made 17 starts and three sub appearances, scoring once, for the Ravens having joined them just before Christmas.

==== Swindon Town (loan) ====
On 31 August 2018, Woolfenden joined League Two side Swindon Town on loan until the end of the season. He scored his first goal for the club in a 1–2 loss to Bury on 15 September 2018.

=== Coventry City ===
On 1 September 2025, he joined EFL Championship club Coventry City on a three-year deal.

== Career statistics ==
As of match played 2 May 2026

Appearances and goals by club, season and competition
Club	Season	League			FA Cup		EFL Cup		Other		Total	
Club	Season	Division	Apps	Goals	Apps	Goals	Apps	Goals	Apps	Goals	Apps	Goals
Ipswich Town	2017–18	Championship	2	0	—		2	0	—		4	0
Ipswich Town	2018–19	Championship	1	0	—		0	0	—		1	0
Ipswich Town	2019–20	League One	31	1	2	0	0	0	3 (Note: Appearances in EFL Trophy)	0	36	1
Ipswich Town	2020–21	League One	25	1	0	0	1	0	2	0	28	1
Ipswich Town	2021–22	League One	31	0	2	0	1	0	4	0	38	0
Ipswich Town	2022–23	League One	41	2	3	0	1	0	2	0	47	2
Ipswich Town	2023–24	Championship	41	1	1	0	0	0	—		42	1
Ipswich Town	2024–25	Premier League	15	0	3	0	0	0	—		18	0
Ipswich Town	2025–26	Championship	0	0	—		1	0	—		1	0
Ipswich Town	Total		187	5	11	0	6	0	11	0	215	5
Bromley (loan)	2017–18	National League	20	1	0	0	—		6 (Note: Appearances in FA Trophy)	0	26	1
Swindon Town (loan)	2018–19	League Two	32	2	2	0	—		2	0	36	2
Coventry City	2025–26	Championship	17	0	1	0	—		—		18	0
Coventry City	2026–27	Premier League	0	0	0	0	—		—		0	0
Coventry City	Total		17	0	1	0	—		—		18	0
Career total			256	8	14	0	6	0	19	0	295	8

== Honours ==
Ipswich Town

- EFL Championship second-place promotion: 2023–24
- EFL League One second-place promotion: 2022–23

Coventry City

- EFL Championship: 2025–26
