= Omari Hutchinson =

English footballer (born 2003)

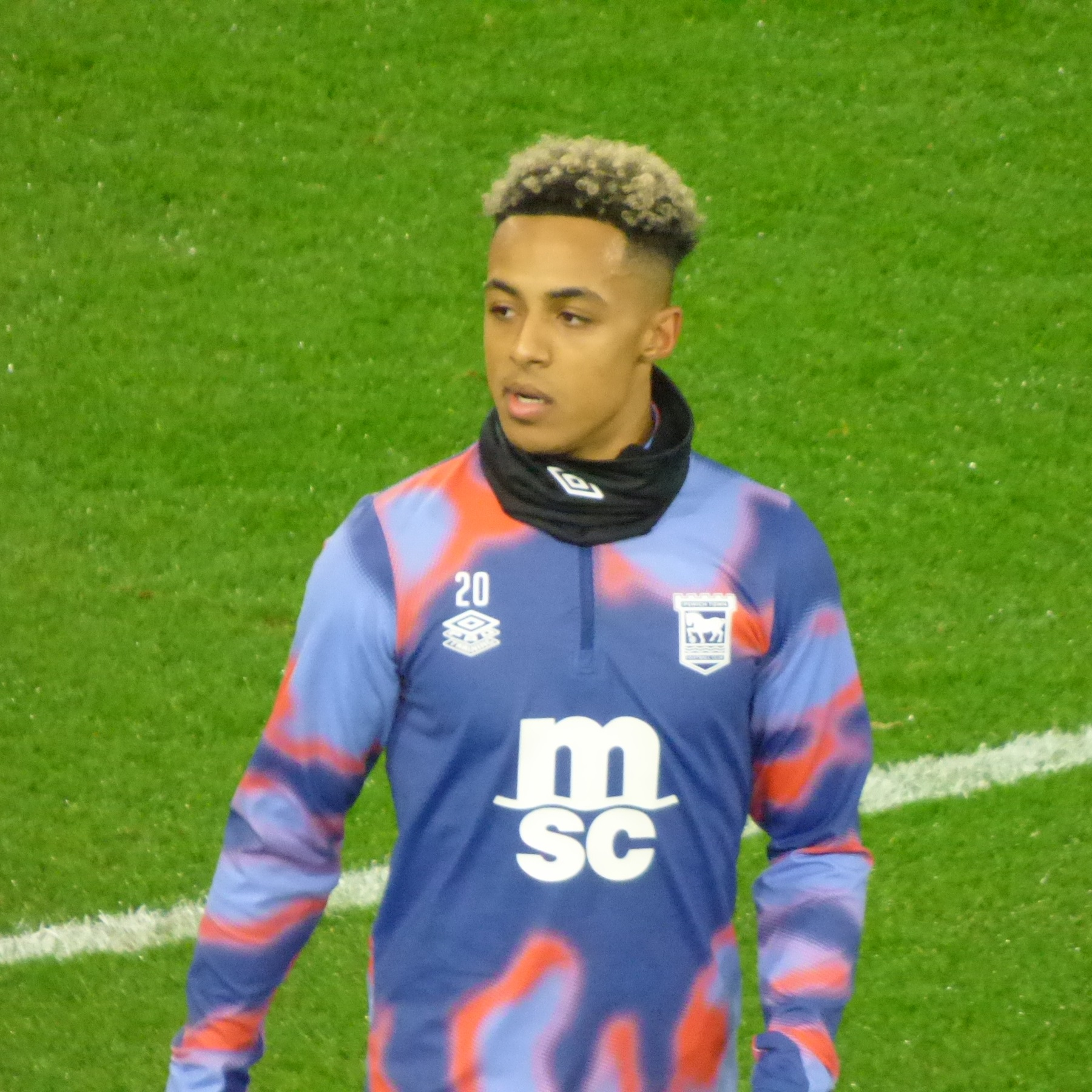
- Hutchinson with Ipswich Town in 2024

Personal information
- Full name: Omari Elijah Giraud-Hutchinson
- Date of birth: 30 October 2003 (age 23)
- Place of birth: Redhill, England
- Height: 5 ft 9 in (1.74 m)
- Positions: Winger; attacking midfielder

Team information
- Current team: AC Milan (on loan from Nottingham Forest)
- Number: 20

Youth career
- 2008–2012: Chelsea
- 2012–2014: Charlton Athletic
- 2015–2022: Arsenal
- 2022–2023: Chelsea

Senior career*
| Years | Team | Apps | (Gls) |
| 2023–2024 | Chelsea | 1 | (0) |
| 2023–2024 | → Ipswich Town (loan) | 44 | (10) |
| 2024–2025 | Ipswich Town | 31 | (3) |
| 2025– | Nottingham Forest | 31 | (1) |
| 2026– | → AC Milan (loan) | 7 | (1) |

International career^{‡}
| 2020 | England U17 | 3 | (0) |
| 2021 | England U19 | 1 | (0) |
| 2023 | Jamaica | 2 | (0) |
| 2024–2025 | England U21 | 10 | (3) |
Medal record
Men's football
Representing England
UEFA European Under-21 Championship
| Winner | 2025 Slovakia |
- * Club domestic league appearances and goals as of 22:50, 8 November 2026 (UTC) ‡ National team caps and goals as of 19:13, 29 June 2025 (UTC)

Omari Elijah Giraud-Hutchinson (born 30 October 2003) is an English professional footballer who plays as a winger or attacking midfielder for Serie A club AC Milan, on loan from Premier League club Nottingham Forest.

== Early life ==
Hutchinson was born in Redhill, England. He grew up in South London along with his older brother O'Shaye, who has played for non-League football clubs Burgess Hill Town, East Grinstead Town and Ramsgate.

== Club career ==
=== Early career ===
Hutchinson began his career with Chelsea, joining in 2008. In a video posted on Chelsea's official website in late July 2023, Hutchinson's father stated that he had been released twice by Chelsea as a child. In 2012, he was scouted and signed by Charlton Athletic while playing football in the Addicks car park as his brother, Oshaye, was training with the youth team. While at Charlton, he caught the eye of North-London rivals Arsenal, having impressed in a game against them.

After two years with Charlton, Hutchinson left the club and trials with Arsenal, Tottenham Hotspur and Brentford followed, but ultimately led to nothing. Hutchinson took a year-long break from academy football to play futsal with his friends, before joining Arsenal at under-12 level. Hutchinson also stated that he spent time with Crystal Palace prior to joining Arsenal.

At the age of twelve, Hutchinson took part in a South-London tournament hosted by Brazilian football legend Pelé, who praised Hutchinson for his skills. At the tournament, he also met football content creators F2Freestylers, who invited him to star in a video on their YouTube channel. The video, showcasing Hutchinson's skills, has amassed over four million views.

In November 2020, Hutchinson signed his first professional contract with Arsenal. He was handed a place on the bench for the Arsenal senior team for the first time in their 1–0 FA Cup defeat to Nottingham Forest on 9 January 2022.

=== Return to Chelsea ===
On 16 July 2022, Hutchinson rejoined Chelsea. He made his professional debut on 5 January 2023 in a 1–0 home defeat against Manchester City, coming on as a second-half substitute.

==== Loan to Ipswich Town ====
On 20 July 2023, Hutchinson agreed to join newly promoted Championship side Ipswich Town on a season-long loan. Despite being unable to fully cement himself in the starting eleven, he was awarded the EFL Championship Player of the Month award for February 2024 having scored three injury-time goals, also contributing two assists.

=== Ipswich Town ===
After helping the club gain promotion to the Premier League after 22 years away, Hutchinson rejoined Ipswich Town on 30 June 2024 and signed a five-year contract for a club-record fee. On 24 November 2024, Hutchinson scored his first Premier League goal in a 1–1 home draw against Manchester United. On 30 December 2024, Hutchinson scored in a 2–0 home league victory over his former club Chelsea to secure the club's first Premier League home win since 2002. He scored his third Premier League goal in a 4–1 home loss to Tottenham Hotspur on 22 February 2025.

=== Nottingham Forest ===
On 16 August 2025, Premier League club Nottingham Forest announced the signing of Hutchinson, on a five-year contract for a fee of £37,500,000.

==== Loan to AC Milan ====
On 31 August 2026, he joined Italian club club AC Milan, on loan for the 2026–27 season with the option to make the move permanent.

== International career ==
Born in England, Hutchinson is of Jamaican descent. He is a youth international for England, having represented England Under-17 in February 2020. The following year he played in qualifiers for England U19.

Hutchinson was called up to the Jamaica national team in May 2022, and made his unofficial debut in a 6–0 loss to Catalonia in the same month. In November 2022, Hutchinson was told by Chelsea not to report for international duty with Jamaica, so that he could be involved in first team matches with The Blues. He made his first official start for Jamaica in a 1–0 loss in a friendly to Trinidad and Tobago on 11 March 2023.

In August 2024, Hutchinson was called up to the England U21 side. He made his debut for that age group during a dramatic 2–1 win over Ukraine at Dean Court on 11 October 2024. Four days later he scored his first international goal during their last qualifier against Azerbaijan at Ashton Gate.

Hutchinson was included in the England squad for the 2025 UEFA European Under-21 Championship. He scored a goal in the final as England defeated Germany 3–2 after extra time to win the tournament.

== Media ==
Hutchinson was involved in the Amazon Original sports docuseries All or Nothing: Arsenal, which documented the club by spending time with the coaching staff and players behind the scenes both on and off the field throughout their 2021–22 season.

== Career statistics ==
=== Club ===
As of match played 8 November 2026

Appearances and goals by club, season and competition
| Club | Season | League | | | National cup (Note: Includes FA Cup) | | League cup (Note: Includes EFL Cup) | | Europe | | Other | | Total | |
| Club | Season | Division | Apps | Goals | Apps | Goals | Apps | Goals | Apps | Goals | Apps | Goals | Apps | Goals |
|---|---|---|---|---|---|---|---|---|---|---|---|---|---|---|
| Arsenal U21 | 2021–22 | — | | | — | | — | | — | | 4 (Note: Appearances in EFL Trophy) | 2 | 4 | 2 |
| Chelsea U21 | 2022–23 | — | | | — | | — | | — | | 4 | 1 | 4 | 1 |
| Chelsea | 2022–23 | Premier League | 1 | 0 | 1 | 0 | 0 | 0 | 0 | 0 | — | | 2 | 0 |
| Ipswich Town (loan) | 2023–24 | Championship | 44 | 10 | 2 | 0 | 4 | 1 | — | | — | | 50 | 11 |
| Ipswich Town | 2024–25 | Premier League | 31 | 3 | 0 | 0 | 1 | 0 | — | | — | | 32 | 3 |
| Nottingham Forest | 2025–26 | Premier League | 31 | 1 | 1 | 0 | 1 | 0 | 8 (Note: Appearances in UEFA Europa League) | 0 | — | | 41 | 1 |
| Nottingham Forest | 2026–27 | Premier League | 0 | 0 | — | | 1 | 0 | — | | — | | 1 | 0 |
| Nottingham Forest | Total | | 31 | 1 | 1 | 0 | 2 | 0 | 8 | 0 | — | | 42 | 1 |
| AC Milan (loan) | 2026–27 | Serie A | 7 | 1 | 0 | 0 | — | | 4 | 0 | — | | 11 | 1 |
| Career total | | | 114 | 15 | 4 | 0 | 7 | 1 | 12 | 0 | 8 | 3 | 145 | 19 |

=== International ===
As of match played 14 March 2023

Appearances and goals by national team and year
| National team | Year | Apps | Goals |
|---|---|---|---|
| Jamaica | 2023 | 2 | 0 |
| Total | | 2 | 0 |

== Honours ==
Ipswich Town

- EFL Championship runner-up: 2023–24

England U21

- UEFA European Under-21 Championship: 2025

Individual

- EFL Championship Player of the Month: February 2024
- Ipswich Town Young Player of the Year: 2023–24
