= Leif Davis =

English footballer (born 1999)

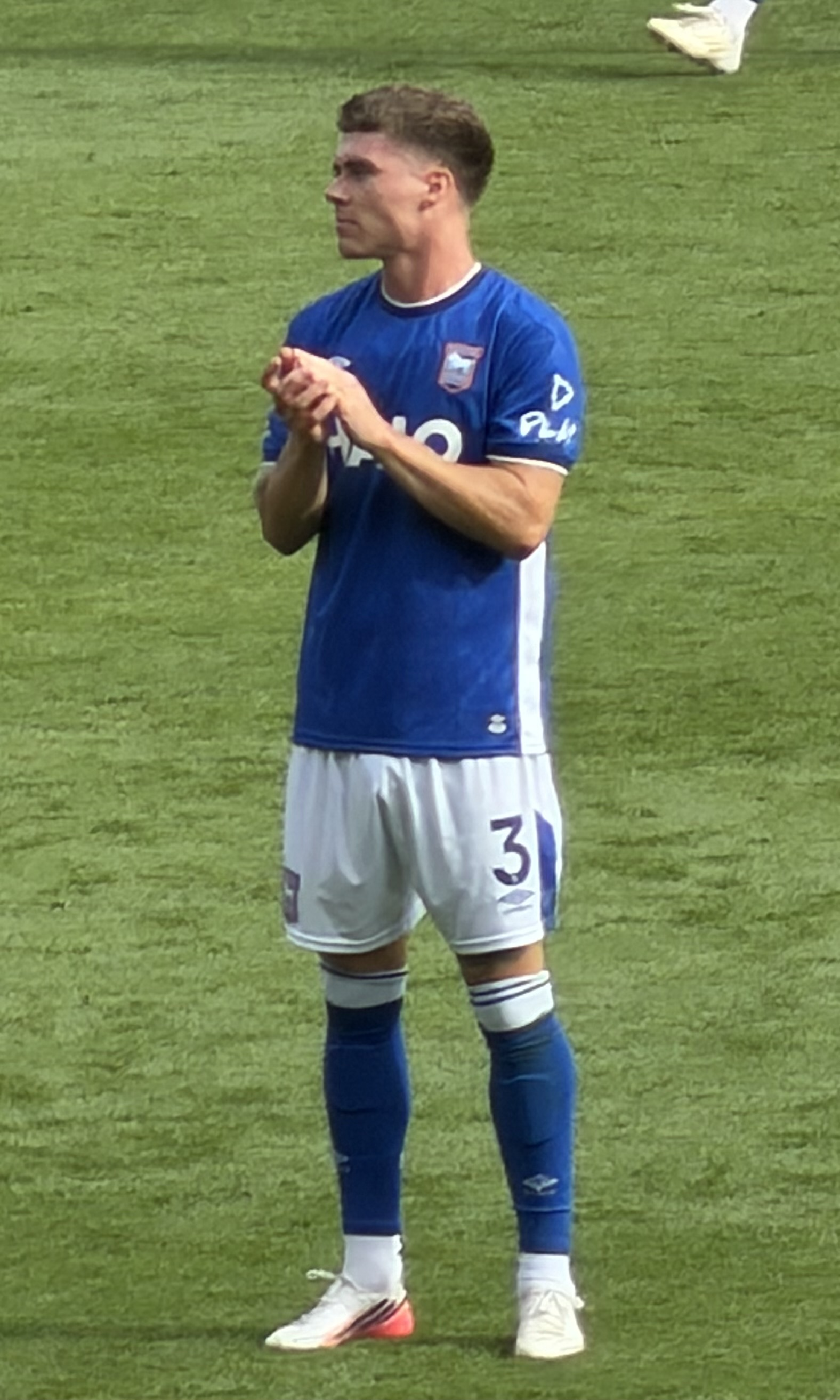
- Davis with Ipswich Town in 2026

Personal information
- Full name: Leif Davis
- Date of birth: 31 December 1999 (age 26)
- Place of birth: Newcastle upon Tyne, England
- Height: 6 ft 0 in (1.82 m)
- Position: Left-back

Team information
- Current team: Ipswich Town
- Number: 3

Youth career
- 2015–2016: Wallsend Boys Club
- 2016–2018: Morecambe
- 2018: Leeds United

Senior career*
Years	Team	Apps	(Gls)
2018–2022	Leeds United	9	(0)
2021–2022	→ AFC Bournemouth (loan)	12	(0)
2022–	Ipswich Town	160	(10)
- * Club domestic league appearances and goals as of 21:02, 12 September 2026 (UTC)

Leif Davis (born 31 December 1999) is an English professional footballer who plays as a left-back for Premier League club Ipswich Town.

Born in Newcastle upon Tyne, Davis spent time in the youth systems at Wallsend Boys Club and Morecambe before joining Leeds United in 2018. He helped Leeds win promotion to the Premier League in 2020. He spent a loan spell at AFC Bournemouth during the 2021–22 season, where he also won promotion to the Premier League. In 2022, Davis signed for Ipswich Town, helping the side win promotion to the EFL Championship in his first season at the club in the 2022–23 campaign, and an immediate subsequent promotion to the Premier League in the 2023–24 season.

== Club career ==
=== Early career ===
Born in Newcastle upon Tyne, Davis started his career at English youth football club Wallsend Boys Club in Wallsend, North Tyneside.

On 27 June 2016, Davis joined Morecambe where he spent two years as a scholar, progressing through the ranks of the club's academy.

=== Leeds United ===
On 4 July 2018, Davis joined EFL Championship side Leeds United under head coach Marcelo Bielsa for an undisclosed fee, where he initially linked up with the Leeds academy.

After impressing for Leeds' Under 23s side, Davis was promoted to the first team and was named as an unused substitute on several occasions by head coach Bielsa before making his debut for the club on 23 December 2018, when he started in a 3–2 win against Aston Villa at Villa Park after Barry Douglas fell ill before kickoff.

Davis was regularly named as an unused substitute on the bench for the first team squad in the Championship, but still featured regularly for Carlos Corberán's Leeds United Under 23s side over the course of the 2018–19 season, that won the PDL Northern League 2018–19 season and became the national Professional Development League champions by beating Birmingham City on penalties in the final in May 2019.

With Davis potentially set for a spell in the first team towards the end of the 2018–19 season, after injuries to left-backs Barry Douglas and Ezgjan Alioski, Davis himself was ruled out for the remainder of the season, including Leeds' play-off campaign, after knee surgery in April. Davis made a total of five appearances during his first season of senior football at Leeds.

Davis made his first appearance of the 2019–20 season as a second-half substitute in a 3–1 away win against Bristol City on the opening day of the season. He went on to make a total of three substitute appearances in the league during the season, as well as two starts in the EFL Cup. After the English professional football season was paused in March 2020 due to the impact of COVID-19, the season was resumed during June, where Davis earned promotion with Leeds to the Premier League and also become the EFL Championship Champions for the 2019–20 season in July after the successful resumption of the season.

His first start of the 2020–21 season came on 16 September 2020 in Leeds' 1–1 draw against Hull City in the EFL Cup. Hull went on to win 9–8 on penalties. Davis made his Premier League debut for Leeds, as a second-half substitute in Leeds' 1–1 draw with Manchester City on 3 October 2020. He made a total of 4 appearances in all competitions as Leeds finished 9th in the club's first season back in the Premier League since 2004.

Davis also featured a number of times for Leeds' U23 side which won the Premier League 2 Division 2 title for the 2020–21 season.

==== AFC Bournemouth (loan) ====
On 27 July 2021, Davis joined Championship side AFC Bournemouth on a season-long loan deal. He made his debut for the club coming on as a late sub in the Cherries 2–1 win over Nottingham Forest on 14 August. Davis then made his first start for Bournemouth in an unfamiliar right wing role, in a 2–0 away win at Birmingham City on 18 August. Davis made 15 appearances in all competitions during the 2021–22 season, with 12 of those appearances coming in the league as he helped Bournemouth achieve promotion to the Premier League following a second-placed finish in the Championship.

=== Ipswich Town ===
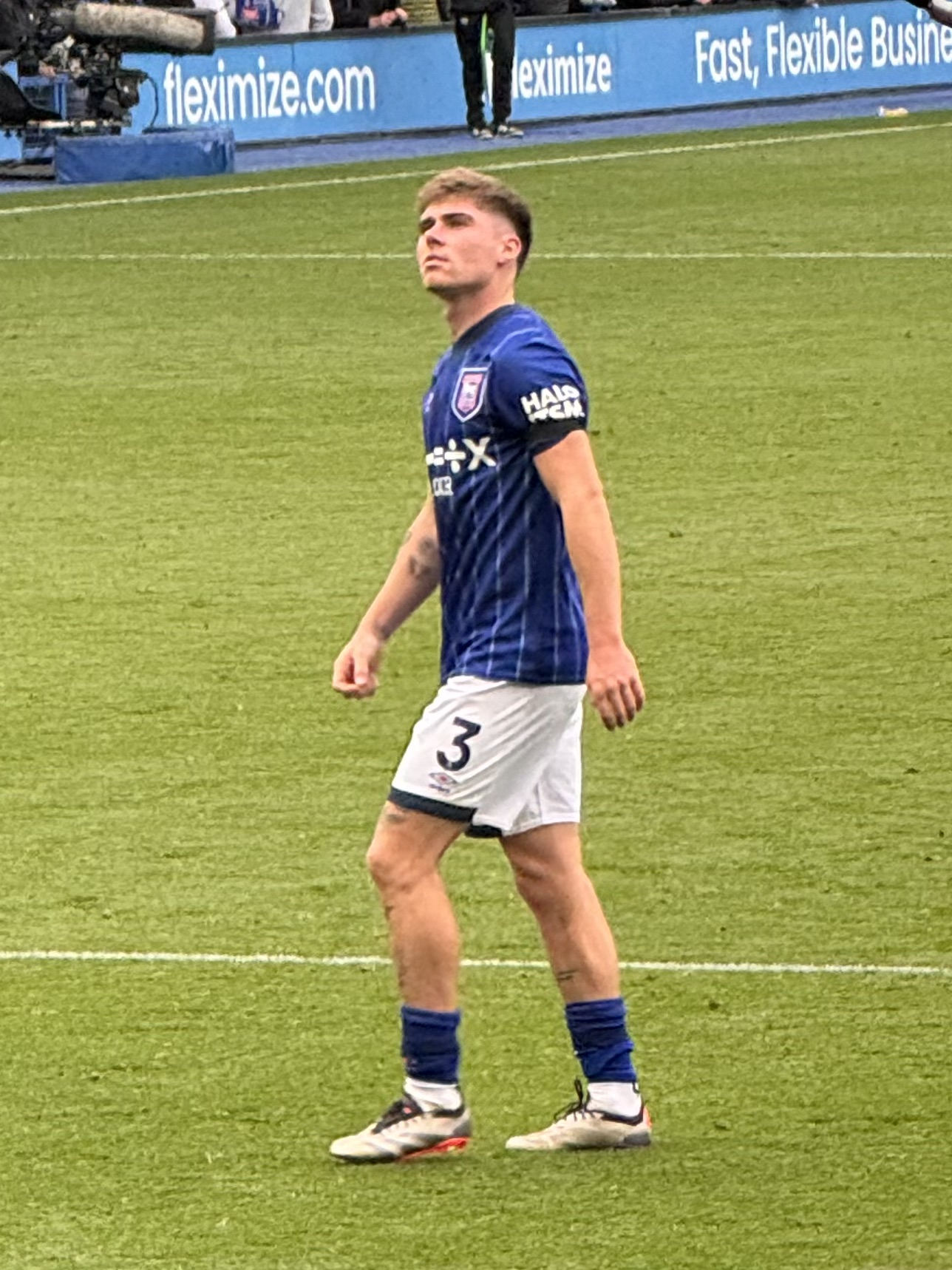
Davis playing for Ipswich Town in 2024

On 25 July 2022, Davis joined Ipswich Town on a three-year contract for a seven-figure fee. He made his debut five days later on the opening day of the 2022–23 season in a 1–1 draw against Bolton Wanderers at Portman Road. He quickly established himself as the first choice left-back at Ipswich. He scored his first goal for the club in a 1–2 away defeat against Oxford United on 21 January 2023. Davis was an integral member of the team during the 2022–23 season with Ipswich, making 46 appearances across all competitions, scoring 3 league goals and getting 14 league assists in total, and helping the club win promotion from EFL League One following a second-placed league finish. His form throughout the season earned him a place in both the EFL League One Team of the Season and the PFA League One Team of the Year.

Davis continued to be a key player for Ipswich throughout the 2023–24 season, making 43 league starts and contributing 18 assists, a record number of assists by a defender in a Championship season, as well as scoring crucial goals in 3–2 home wins against Bristol City and Southampton in the later stages of the season. He helped Ipswich earn a second successive promotion as Ipswich won promotion to the Premier League as Championship runners-up. His performances throughout the season saw him included in the EFL Championship Team of the Season and PFA Championship Team of the Year as well as being named as Ipswich's Players' Player of the Year and being nominated for the PFA Championship Player of the Season award.

Following Ipswich's promotion to the Premier League, Davis signed a new contract with Ipswich until 2028 on 21 October 2024. He scored his first Premier League goal for Ipswich in a 1–1 home draw on 2 November 2024 against Leicester City: a stunning 55th-minute volley which was cancelled out by Jordan Ayew in the 94th minute. The goal was nominated for the Premier League Goal of the Month award for November.

== Style of play ==
Davis predominantly plays as a left-back. During his time at Leeds United, he was converted by then Leeds United Under 23s manager Carlos Corberán to also play as a centre-back. Davis describes his style of play as "a modern-day, attacking left-back". Davis is known for his crossing ability and set piece taking and his ability to create chances and provide assists.

== Personal life ==
Outside of football, Davis has expressed an interest in becoming an aircraft pilot. He often uses Microsoft Flight Simulator in his spare time and has stated that he would like to train for a pilot licence after he retires from playing football.

== Career statistics ==
As of match played 12 September 2026

Appearances and goals by club, season and competition
Club	Season	League			FA Cup		EFL Cup		Other		Total	
Club	Season	Division	Apps	Goals	Apps	Goals	Apps	Goals	Apps	Goals	Apps	Goals
Leeds United	2018–19	Championship	4	0	1	0	0	0	0	0	5	0
Leeds United	2019–20	Championship	3	0	0	0	2	0	—		5	0
Leeds United	2020–21	Premier League	2	0	1	0	1	0	—		4	0
Leeds United	Total		9	0	2	0	3	0	0	0	14	0
Leeds United U21	2020–21	—	—		—		—		2 (Note: Appearance(s) in EFL Trophy)	0	2	0
AFC Bournemouth (loan)	2021–22	Championship	12	0	2	0	1	0	—		15	0
Ipswich Town	2022–23	League One	43	3	2	0	0	0	1	0	46	3
Ipswich Town	2023–24	Championship	43	2	1	0	0	0	—		44	2
Ipswich Town	2024–25	Premier League	33	1	0	0	0	0	—		33	1
Ipswich Town	2025–26	Championship	37	2	0	0	1	0	—		38	2
Ipswich Town	2026–27	Premier League	4	2	0	0	1	0	—		5	2
Ipswich Town	Total		160	10	3	0	2	0	1	0	166	10
Career total			181	10	7	0	6	0	3	0	197	10

== Honours ==
Leeds United

- EFL Championship: 2019–20

AFC Bournemouth

- EFL Championship runner-up: 2021–22

Ipswich Town

- EFL Championship runner-up: 2023–24, 2025–26
- EFL League One runner-up: 2022–23

Individual

- EFL League One Team of the Season: 2022–23
- PFA Team of the Year: 2022–23 League One, 2023–24 Championship
- EFL Championship Team of the Season: 2023–24
- The Athletic Championship Team of the Season: 2023–24
- Ipswich Town Players' Player of the Year: 2023–24
