= Harley Curtis =

English footballer (born 2002)

Personal information
- Full name: Harley William Curtis
- Date of birth: 23 October 2002 (age 24)
- Place of birth: Ipswich, England
- Position: Forward

Team information
- Current team: Bury Town

Youth career
- 2019–2021: Ipswich Town

Senior career*
Years	Team	Apps	(Gls)
2021–2023	Ipswich Town	0	(0)
2023	→ Braintree Town (loan)	2	(0)
2023–2024	Chesterfield	6	(0)
2024	→ King's Lynn Town (loan)	4	(0)
2024	Needham Market	7	(0)
2024–2025	Leiston	14	(0)
2025	Ipswich Wanderers	5	(0)
2025–	Bury Town	0	(0)
- * Club domestic league appearances and goals as of 06:03, 8 February 2025 (UTC)

Harley William Curtis (born 23 October 2002) is an English semi-professional footballer who plays as a forward for Isthmian League Division One North side Bury Town.

== Career ==
=== Ipswich Town ===
Curtis joined Ipswich Town after a successful trial in December 2018. He signed a two-year scholarship contract in July 2019.

Curtis featured in the 2020/2021 FA Youth Cup and scored the winner against Fulham in the third round. Ipswich made it to the semi-finals of the competition before losing 2–1 to Liverpool.

On 11 June 2021, Curtis signed his first professional contract, signing a one-year deal.

On 30 June 2023, Curtis left the club when his contract expired.

==== Braintree Town (loan) ====
On 24 March 2023, Curtis joined Braintree Town on loan until the end of the season. He made his debut the following day, coming off the bench in a 2–0 loss to Taunton Town in the National League South.

He made one more appearance off the bench before returning to Ipswich at the end of the season.

=== Chesterfield ===
On 20 July 2023, Curtis joined National League club Chesterfield who were managed by former Ipswich boss Paul Cook.

On 14 October 2023, Curtis made his debut in the FA Cup Fourth Qualifying Round against Kettering Town, coming off the bench in a 5–0 win.

Curtis made his league debut for the club, coming off the bench in a 4–0 win against York City in the National League.

==== King's Lynn Town (loan) ====
On 4 January 2024, Curtis joined King's Lynn Town on loan for an initial one-month deal. He made his debut two day later, starting in a 1–0 home loss to Darlington in the National League North.

=== Needham Market ===
In July 2024, Curtis signed for newly promoted National League North club Needham Market.

== Career statistics ==
As of end of 2023–24 season

Appearances and goals by club, season and competition
Club	Season	League			FA Cup		EFL Cup		Other		Total	
Club	Season	Division	Apps	Goals	Apps	Goals	Apps	Goals	Apps	Goals	Apps	Goals
Ipswich Town	2021–22	League One	0	0	0	0	0	0	0	0	0	0
Ipswich Town	2022–23	League One	0	0	0	0	0	0	0	0	0	0
Ipswich Town	Total		0	0	0	0	0	0	0	0	0	0
Braintree Town (loan)	2022–23	National League South	2	0	0	0	—		—		2	0
Chesterfield	2023–24	National League	6	0	1	0	—		1 (Note: Appearance(s) in FA Trophy)	1	8	1
King's Lynn Town (loan)	2023–24	National League North	4	0	0	0	—		—		4	0
Career total			12	0	1	0	0	0	1	1	14	1

== Honours ==
Chesterfield

- National League: 2023–24
