= 2023–24 EFL Championship =

20th season of the Football League Championship

EFL Championship
- Season: 2023–24
- Dates: 4 August 2023 – 4 May 2024
- Champions: Leicester City; 2nd Championship title 8th 2nd tier title
- Promoted: Leicester City; Ipswich Town; Southampton
- Relegated: Birmingham City; Huddersfield Town; Rotherham United
- Matches: 552
- Goals: 1,480 (2.68 per match)
- Top goalscorer: Sammie Szmodics (Blackburn Rovers) (27 goals)
- Biggest home win: Ipswich Town 6–0; Sheffield Wednesday (16 March 2024)
- Biggest away win: Stoke City 0–5; Leicester City (3 February 2024)
- Highest scoring: Southampton 4–4; Norwich City (12 August 2023); Plymouth Argyle 6–2; Norwich City (23 September 2023); Southampton 5–3; Huddersfield Town (10 February 2024)
- Longest winning run: Leeds United; Leicester City (9 games)
- Longest unbeaten run: Southampton (22 games)
- Longest winless run: Rotherham United (15 games)
- Longest losing run: Rotherham United (9 games)
- Highest attendance: 44,407; Sunderland 1–2; Ipswich Town (6 August 2023)
- Lowest attendance: 9,221; Rotherham United; 1–2 Bristol City (4 October 2023)
- Total attendance: 12,717,037
- Average attendance: 23,038

The 2023–24 EFL Championship (also referred to as the Sky Bet Championship for sponsorship reasons) was the 8th season of the EFL Championship under its current title and the 32nd season under its current league division format.

== Team changes ==
The following teams have changed division since the 2022–23 season:

=== To Championship ===
Promoted from League One

- Plymouth Argyle
- Ipswich Town
- Sheffield Wednesday

Relegated from the Premier League

- Leicester City
- Leeds United
- Southampton

=== From Championship ===
Promoted to the Premier League

- Burnley
- Sheffield United
- Luton Town

Relegated to League One

- Reading
- Blackpool
- Wigan Athletic

== Stadiums ==
Locations of the 2023–24 EFL Championship teams

Team	Location	Stadium	Capacity
Birmingham City	Birmingham	St Andrew's	29,409
Blackburn Rovers	Blackburn	Ewood Park	31,367
Bristol City	Bristol	Ashton Gate Stadium	27,000
Cardiff City	Cardiff	Cardiff City Stadium	33,280
Coventry City	Coventry	Coventry Building Society Arena	32,609
Huddersfield Town	Huddersfield	Kirklees Stadium	24,121
Hull City	Kingston upon Hull	MKM Stadium	25,586
Ipswich Town	Ipswich	Portman Road	29,673
Leeds United	Leeds	Elland Road	37,608
Leicester City	Leicester	King Power Stadium	32,262
Middlesbrough	Middlesbrough	Riverside Stadium	34,742
Millwall	London (South Bermondsey)	The Den	20,146
Norwich City	Norwich	Carrow Road	27,359
Plymouth Argyle	Plymouth	Home Park	17,900
Preston North End	Preston	Deepdale	23,404
Queens Park Rangers	London (White City)	Loftus Road	18,439
Rotherham United	Rotherham	New York Stadium	12,021
Sheffield Wednesday	Sheffield	Hillsborough Stadium	34,835
Southampton	Southampton	St Mary's Stadium	32,384
Stoke City	Stoke-on-Trent	bet365 Stadium	30,089
Sunderland	Sunderland	Stadium of Light	49,000
Swansea City	Swansea	Swansea.com Stadium	21,088
Watford	Watford	Vicarage Road	22,200
West Bromwich Albion	West Bromwich	The Hawthorns	26,850

== Personnel and sponsoring ==
Team	Manager	Captain	Kit manufacturer	Shirt sponsor (chest)	Shirt sponsor (back)	Shirt sponsor (sleeve)	Shorts sponsor
Birmingham City	(England) Tony Mowbray (on leave, medical) (England) Gary Rowett (interim head coach)	(England) Dion Sanderson	(United States) Nike	Undefeated	Undefeated	Birmingham City Foundation	Knighthead Annuity & Life Assurance Company
Blackburn Rovers	(England) John Eustace	(Scotland) Dominic Hyam	(Italy) Macron	Totally Wicked	Watson Ramsbottom Solicitors	Venky's	Venky's
Bristol City	(England) Liam Manning	(England) Matty James	(Republic of Ireland) O'Neills	Huboo	GoSkippy	Watches of Bath	Digital NRG
Cardiff City	(Turkey) Erol Bulut	(England) Joe Ralls	(United States) New Balance	Visit Malaysia	Spreadex Sports	Watches of Bath	None
Coventry City	(England) Mark Robins	(Scotland) Liam Kelly	(Denmark) Hummel	King of Shaves	Coventry Building Society	XL Motors	G&R Scaffolding
Huddersfield Town	(Germany) André Breitenreiter	(England) Jonathan Hogg	(England) Umbro	Utilita (Home & Away) Utilita Giving (Third)	SportsBroker	Marc Darcy	PCSpecialist
Hull City	(England) Liam Rosenior	(England) Lewie Coyle	(Italy) Kappa	Corendon Airlines	McVitie's	Anex Tour	None
Ipswich Town	(Northern Ireland) Kieran McKenna	(Egypt) Samy Morsy	(England) Umbro	+–=÷× Tour	Ipswich Town Foundation	HaloITSM	YourHome.co.uk
Leeds United	(Germany) Daniel Farke	(Scotland) Liam Cooper	(Germany) Adidas	BOXT	AMT Auto	Flamingo Land	None
Leicester City	(Italy) Enzo Maresca	(England) Jamie Vardy	(Germany) Adidas	King Power	None	Sabeco Brewery	None
Middlesbrough	(England) Michael Carrick	(England) Jonathan Howson	(Italy) Erreà	Unibet	Host & Stay	BOXT Life	BOXT Life
Millwall	(England) Neil Harris	(England) Shaun Hutchinson	(Italy) Erreà	Huski Chocolate	Wiggett Group	Cremello Currency Management	None
Norwich City	(United States) David Wagner	(Scotland) Grant Hanley	(Spain) Joma	Lotus Cars	Sekura.id	Gran Canaria	3B Data Security
Plymouth Argyle	(England) Neil Dewsnip (interim head coach)	(England) Joe Edwards	(Germany) Puma	Bond Timber	Project 35	Vertu Motors	Retain Limited
Preston North End	(England) Ryan Lowe	(Republic of Ireland) Alan Browne	(England) Castore	PAR Group	PAR Group	None	None
Queens Park Rangers	(Spain) Martí Cifuentes	(Bosnia and Herzegovina) Asmir Begović	(Italy) Erreà	Convivia Group	CopyBet	MyGuava	Hyde Park Construction
Rotherham United	(Scotland) Steve Evans	(England) Sean Morrison	(Germany) Puma	Rotherham Hospice	Burrows Toyota	Instantprint	Mears Group
Sheffield Wednesday	(Germany) Danny Röhl	(Scotland) Barry Bannan	(Italy) Macron	Cirata^{1}	TriggerHub.org	Triggerhub.org	BLU Steel
Southampton	(Scotland) Russell Martin	(England) Jack Stephens	(Denmark) Hummel	Sportsbet.io	Draper Tools	Mairon Freight UK	None
Stoke City	(England) Steven Schumacher	(England) Josh Laurent	(Italy) Macron	bet365	Stoke City Community Trust	None	None
Sunderland	(England) Mike Dodds (interim head coach)	(Northern Ireland) Corry Evans	(United States) Nike	Spreadex Sports	Vertu Motors	Hays Travel	Eleven Sports Media
Swansea City	(England) Luke Williams	(England) Matt Grimes	(Spain) Joma	Reviva Coffee (Home); Westacres (Away & Third)	Swansea Building Society	Visit Central Florida	The Wave 96.4 FM (Home); Miles Hire (Away); Maggie's Swansea (Third)
Watford	(England) Tom Cleverley	(Austria) Daniel Bachmann	(Spain) Kelme	MrQ.com	Corpay	None	None
West Bromwich Albion	(Spain) Carlos Corberán	(England) Jed Wallace	(Germany) Puma	Ideal Heating	Mr Vegas	BarberBoss	None

1. Sheffield Wednesday's shirt sponsor was Eyup until 9 February 2024 when the deal was ended prematurely.

== Managerial changes ==
Team	Outgoing manager	Manner of departure	Date of vacancy	Position in table	Incoming manager	Date of appointment
Watford	(England) Chris Wilder	End of contract	8 May 2023	Pre-season	(France) Valérien Ismaël	10 May 2023
Cardiff City	(France) Sabri Lamouchi	End of contract	16 May 2023	Pre-season	(Turkey) Erol Bulut	3 June 2023
Southampton	(Spain) Rubén Sellés	End of contract	28 May 2023	Pre-season	(Scotland) Russell Martin	21 June 2023
Leeds United	(England) Sam Allardyce	Mutual consent	2 June 2023	Pre-season	(Germany) Daniel Farke	4 July 2023
Leicester City	(England) Dean Smith	End of contract	16 June 2023	Pre-season	(Italy) Enzo Maresca	16 June 2023
Sheffield Wednesday	(Jamaica) Darren Moore	Mutual consent	19 June 2023	Pre-season	(Spain) Xisco Muñoz	4 July 2023
Swansea City	(Scotland) Russell Martin	Signed by Southampton	21 June 2023	Pre-season	(Northern Ireland) Michael Duff	22 June 2023
Huddersfield Town	(England) Neil Warnock	Resigned	20 September 2023	16th	(Jamaica) Darren Moore	21 September 2023
Sheffield Wednesday	(Spain) Xisco Muñoz	Sacked	4 October 2023	24th	(Germany) Danny Röhl	13 October 2023
Birmingham City	(England) John Eustace	Sacked	9 October 2023	6th	(England) Wayne Rooney	11 October 2023
Millwall	(England) Gary Rowett	Mutual consent	18 October 2023	15th	(England) Joe Edwards	6 November 2023
Queens Park Rangers	(England) Gareth Ainsworth	Sacked	28 October 2023	23rd	(Spain) Martí Cifuentes	30 October 2023
Bristol City	(England) Nigel Pearson	Sacked	29 October 2023	15th	(England) Liam Manning	7 November 2023
Rotherham United	(England) Matt Taylor	Sacked	13 November 2023	22nd	(England) Leam Richardson	11 December 2023
Swansea City	(Northern Ireland) Michael Duff	Sacked	4 December 2023	18th	(England) Luke Williams	5 January 2024
Sunderland	(England) Tony Mowbray	Sacked	4 December 2023	9th	(England) Michael Beale	18 December 2023
Stoke City	(Scotland) Alex Neil	Sacked	10 December 2023	20th	(England) Steven Schumacher	19 December 2023
Plymouth Argyle	(England) Steven Schumacher	Signed by Stoke City	19 December 2023	16th	(England) Ian Foster	5 January 2024
Birmingham City	(England) Wayne Rooney	Sacked	2 January 2024	20th	(England) Tony Mowbray	8 January 2024
Huddersfield Town	(Jamaica) Darren Moore	Sacked	29 January 2024	21st	(Germany) André Breitenreiter	15 February 2024
Blackburn Rovers	(Denmark) Jon Dahl Tomasson	Mutual consent	9 February 2024	18th	(England) John Eustace	9 February 2024
Sunderland	(England) Michael Beale	Sacked	19 February 2024	10th	(England) Mike Dodds (interim head coach)	19 February 2024
Millwall	(England) Joe Edwards	Sacked	21 February 2024	21st	(England) Neil Harris	21 February 2024
Watford	(France) Valérien Ismaël	Sacked	9 March 2024	13th	(England) Tom Cleverley (Note: Cleverley was initially named interim head coach before being appointed as permanent head coach on 24 April 2024.)	9 March 2024
Birmingham City	(England) Tony Mowbray	Temporary medical leave of absence	19 March 2024	21st	(England) Gary Rowett (interim head coach)	19 March 2024
Plymouth Argyle	(England) Ian Foster	Sacked	1 April 2024	21st	(England) Neil Dewsnip (interim head coach)	1 April 2024
Rotherham United	(England) Leam Richardson	Sacked	17 April 2024	24th	(Scotland) Steve Evans	17 April 2024

== League table ==
Pos	Team	Pld	W	D	L	GF	GA	GD	Pts	Promotion, qualification or relegation
1	Leicester City (C, P)	46	31	4	11	89	41	+48	97	Promoted to the Premier League
2	Ipswich Town (P)	46	28	12	6	92	57	+35	96	Promoted to the Premier League
3	Leeds United	46	27	9	10	81	43	+38	90	Qualified for the Championship play-offs
4	Southampton (O, P)	46	26	9	11	87	63	+24	87	Qualified for the Championship play-offs
5	West Bromwich Albion	46	21	12	13	70	47	+23	75	Qualified for the Championship play-offs
6	Norwich City	46	21	10	15	79	64	+15	73	Qualified for the Championship play-offs
7	Hull City	46	19	13	14	68	60	+8	70	
8	Middlesbrough	46	20	9	17	71	62	+9	69	
9	Coventry City	46	17	13	16	70	59	+11	64	
10	Preston North End	46	18	9	19	56	67	−11	63	
11	Bristol City	46	17	11	18	53	51	+2	62	
12	Cardiff City	46	19	5	22	53	70	−17	62	
13	Millwall	46	16	11	19	45	55	−10	59	
14	Swansea City	46	15	12	19	59	65	−6	57	
15	Watford	46	13	17	16	61	61	0	56	
16	Sunderland	46	16	8	22	52	54	−2	56	
17	Stoke City	46	15	11	20	49	60	−11	56	
18	Queens Park Rangers	46	15	11	20	47	58	−11	56	
19	Blackburn Rovers	46	14	11	21	60	74	−14	53	
20	Sheffield Wednesday	46	15	8	23	44	68	−24	53	
21	Plymouth Argyle	46	13	12	21	59	70	−11	51	
22	Birmingham City (R)	46	13	11	22	50	65	−15	50	Relegated to EFL League One
23	Huddersfield Town (R)	46	9	18	19	48	77	−29	45	Relegated to EFL League One
24	Rotherham United (R)	46	5	12	29	37	89	−52	27	Relegated to EFL League One

Source: EFL official website
Rules for classification: 1) Points; 2) Goal difference; 3) Number of goals scored; 4) Head-to-head results; 5) Wins; 6) Away goals; 7) Penalty points (sec 9.5); 8) Number of 12-point sending off offences; 9) Play-off (only if needed to determine promotion/relegation)
(C) Champions; (O) Play-off winners; (P) Promoted; (R) Relegated

== Results ==
Home \ Away	BIR	BLB	BRC	CAR	COV	HUD	HUL	IPS	LEE	LEI	MID	MIL	NOR	PLY	PNE	QPR	ROT	SHW	SOU	STO	SUN	SWA	WAT	WBA
Birmingham City	—	1–0	0–0	0–1	3–0	4–1	0–2	2–2	1–0	2–3	0–1	1–1	1–0	2–1	1–0	0–0	0–0	2–1	3–4	1–3	2–1	2–2	0–1	3–1
Blackburn Rovers	4–2	—	2–1	1–0	0–0	1–1	1–2	0–1	0–2	1–4	2–1	1–1	1–1	1–1	1–2	1–2	2–2	1–3	0–0	3–1	1–3	0–1	1–2	2–1
Bristol City	0–2	5–0	—	0–1	1–0	1–1	3–2	0–1	0–1	1–0	3–2	0–1	1–2	4–1	1–1	0–1	2–0	1–0	3–1	2–3	1–0	1–0	1–1	0–0
Cardiff City	0–1	0–0	2–0	—	3–2	1–0	1–3	2–1	0–3	0–2	1–4	1–0	2–3	2–2	0–2	1–2	2–0	2–1	2–1	2–1	0–2	2–0	1–1	0–1
Coventry City	2–0	1–0	2–2	1–2	—	1–1	2–3	1–2	2–1	3–1	3–0	2–1	1–1	1–0	0–3	1–2	5–0	2–0	1–1	0–0	0–0	2–2	3–3	0–2
Huddersfield Town	1–1	3–0	1–1	0–4	1–3	—	1–2	1–1	1–1	0–1	1–2	1–0	0–4	1–1	1–3	2–1	2–0	4–0	1–1	2–2	1–0	0–4	0–0	1–4
Hull City	1–1	3–2	1–1	3–0	1–1	1–0	—	3–3	0–0	2–2	2–2	1–0	1–2	1–1	1–0	3–0	4–1	4–2	1–2	0–2	0–1	0–1	1–2	1–1
Ipswich Town	3–1	4–3	3–2	3–2	2–1	2–0	3–0	—	3–4	1–1	1–1	3–1	2–2	3–2	4–2	0–0	4–3	6–0	3–2	2–0	2–1	3–2	0–0	2–2
Leeds United	3–0	0–1	2–1	2–2	1–1	4–1	3–1	4–0	—	3–1	3–2	2–0	1–0	2–1	2–1	1–0	3–0	0–0	1–2	1–0	0–0	3–1	3–0	1–1
Leicester City	2–1	0–2	1–0	2–1	2–1	4–1	0–1	1–1	0–1	—	1–2	3–2	3–1	4–0	3–0	1–2	3–0	2–0	5–0	2–0	1–0	3–1	2–0	2–1
Middlesbrough	1–0	0–0	1–2	2–0	1–3	1–1	1–2	0–2	3–4	1–0	—	0–1	3–1	0–2	4–0	0–2	1–1	2–0	2–1	0–2	1–1	2–0	3–1	1–0
Millwall	1–0	1–2	0–1	3–1	0–3	1–1	2–2	0–4	0–3	1–0	1–3	—	1–0	1–0	1–1	2–0	3–0	0–2	0–1	1–0	1–1	0–3	1–0	1–1
Norwich City	2–0	1–3	1–1	4–1	2–1	2–0	2–1	1–0	2–3	0–2	1–2	3–1	—	2–1	0–0	1–0	5–0	3–1	1–1	1–0	1–0	2–2	4–2	2–0
Plymouth Argyle	3–3	3–0	0–1	3–1	2–2	3–1	1–0	0–2	0–2	1–0	3–3	0–2	6–2	—	0–1	1–1	3–2	3–0	1–2	2–1	2–0	1–3	3–3	0–3
Preston North End	2–1	2–2	2–0	1–2	3–2	4–1	0–0	3–2	2–1	0–3	2–1	1–1	0–1	2–1	—	0–2	3–0	0–1	2–2	1–2	2–1	2–1	1–5	0–4
Queens Park Rangers	2–1	0–4	0–0	1–2	1–3	1–1	2–0	0–1	4–0	1–2	0–2	2–0	2–2	0–0	1–0	—	2–1	0–2	0–1	4–2	1–3	1–1	1–2	2–2
Rotherham United	0–0	2–2	1–2	5–2	2–0	0–0	1–2	2–2	1–1	1–2	1–0	2–1	2–1	0–1	1–1	1–1	—	0–1	0–2	0–1	1–1	1–2	0–1	0–2
Sheffield Wednesday	2–0	3–1	2–1	1–2	1–2	0–0	3–1	0–1	0–2	1–1	1–1	0–4	2–2	1–0	0–1	2–1	2–0	—	1–2	1–1	0–3	1–1	0–0	3–0
Southampton	3–1	4–0	1–0	2–0	2–1	5–3	1–2	0–1	3–1	1–4	1–1	1–2	4–4	2–1	3–0	2–1	1–1	4–0	—	0–1	4–2	5–0	3–2	2–1
Stoke City	1–2	0–3	4–0	0–0	0–1	1–1	1–3	0–0	1–0	0–5	2–0	0–0	0–3	3–0	0–2	1–0	4–1	0–1	0–1	—	2–1	1–1	1–0	2–2
Sunderland	3–1	1–5	0–0	0–1	0–3	1–2	0–1	1–2	1–0	0–1	0–4	0–1	3–1	3–1	2–0	0–0	2–1	0–2	5–0	3–1	—	1–2	2–0	2–1
Swansea City	1–1	2–1	1–2	2–0	1–1	1–1	2–2	1–2	0–4	1–3	1–2	0–1	2–1	0–1	2–1	0–1	1–0	3–0	1–3	3–0	0–0	—	0–1	1–0
Watford	2–0	0–1	1–4	0–1	1–2	1–2	0–0	1–2	2–2	1–2	2–3	2–2	3–2	0–0	0–0	4–0	5–0	1–0	1–1	1–1	1–0	1–1	—	2–2
West Bromwich Albion	1–0	4–1	2–0	2–0	2–1	1–2	3–1	2–0	1–0	1–2	4–2	0–0	1–0	0–0	3–0	2–0	2–0	1–0	0–2	1–1	0–1	3–2	2–2	—

Source: efl.com
Legend: Blue = home team win; Yellow = draw; Red = away team win.
For upcoming matches, an "a" indicates there is an article about the rivalry between the two participants.

== Play-offs ==
Semi-finals
3	Leeds United	0	4	4
6	Norwich City	0	0	0
4	Southampton	0	3	3
5	West Bromwich Albion	0	1	1

Final
3	Leeds United	0
4	Southampton	1

=== Semi-finals ===
First leg

12 May 2024
12:00 BST

Norwich City	0–0	Leeds United
	Report

Carrow Road, Norwich
Attendance: 26,982
Referee: Josh Smith
12 May 2024
14:15 BST

West Bromwich Albion	0–0	Southampton
	Report

The Hawthorns, West Bromwich
Attendance: 25,367
Referee: Sam Barrott

Second leg

16 May 2024
20:00 BST

Leeds United	4–0	Norwich City
Gruev 7'; Piroe 20'; Rutter 40'; Summerville 68'	Report

Elland Road, Leeds
Attendance: 36,384
Referee: Jarred Gillett

Leeds United won 4–0 on aggregate.

17 May 2024
20:00 BST

Southampton	3–1	West Bromwich Albion
Smallbone 49'; A. Armstrong 78', 86' (pen.)	Report	Kipré 90+7'

St Mary's Stadium, Southampton
Attendance: 30,712
Referee: Tim Robinson

Southampton won 3–1 on aggregate.

=== Final ===
26 May 2024
15:00 BST

Leeds United	0–1	Southampton
	Report	A. Armstrong 24'

Wembley Stadium, London
Attendance: 85,862
Referee: John Brooks

== Season statistics ==
=== Top scorers ===
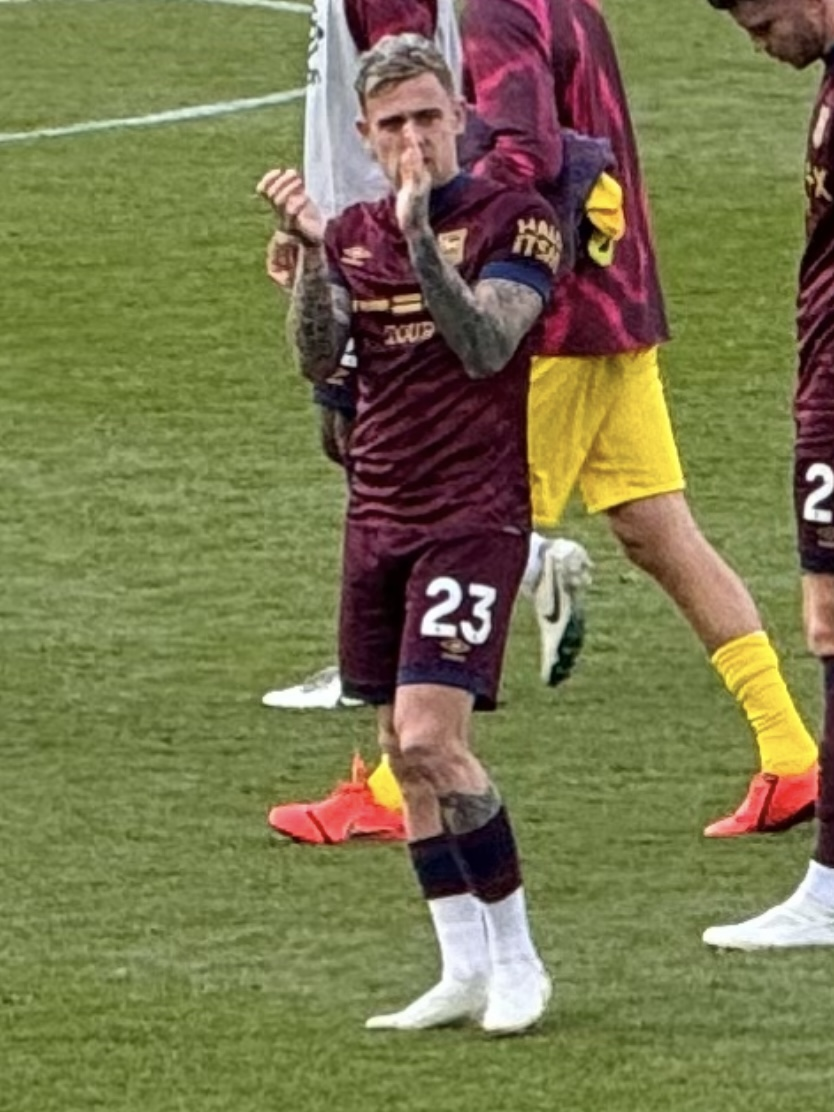
Sammie Szmodics of Blackburn Rovers was the season's top goalscorer, having scored 27 goals.

Rank	Player	Club	Goals
1	(Republic of Ireland) Sammie Szmodics	Blackburn Rovers	27
2	(England) Adam Armstrong^{3}	Southampton	24
3	(Netherlands) Crysencio Summerville^{1}	Leeds United	20
4	(England) Morgan Whittaker	Plymouth Argyle	19
5	(England) Jamie Vardy	Leicester City	18
6	(Scotland) Ché Adams	Southampton	16
6	(Ivory Coast) Emmanuel Latte Lath	Middlesbrough	16
6	(United States) Josh Sargent	Norwich City	16
6	(United States) Haji Wright	Coventry City	16
10	(England) Jack Clarke	Sunderland	15

- ^{1} Includes 1 goal in The Championship play-offs.
- ^{3} Includes 3 goals in The Championship play-offs.

==== Hat-tricks ====
Player	For	Against	Result	Date
(Turkey) Ozan Tufan	Hull City	Sheffield Wednesday	4–2 (H)	12 August 2023
(England) Morgan Whittaker	Plymouth Argyle	Norwich City	6–2 (H)	23 September 2023
(England) Ellis Simms	Coventry City	Rotherham United	5–0 (H)	5 March 2024
(Montenegro) Milutin Osmajić	Preston North End	Huddersfield Town	4–1 (H)	9 April 2024
(Ghana) Abdul Fatawu	Leicester City	Southampton	5–0 (H)	23 April 2024

=== Clean sheets ===
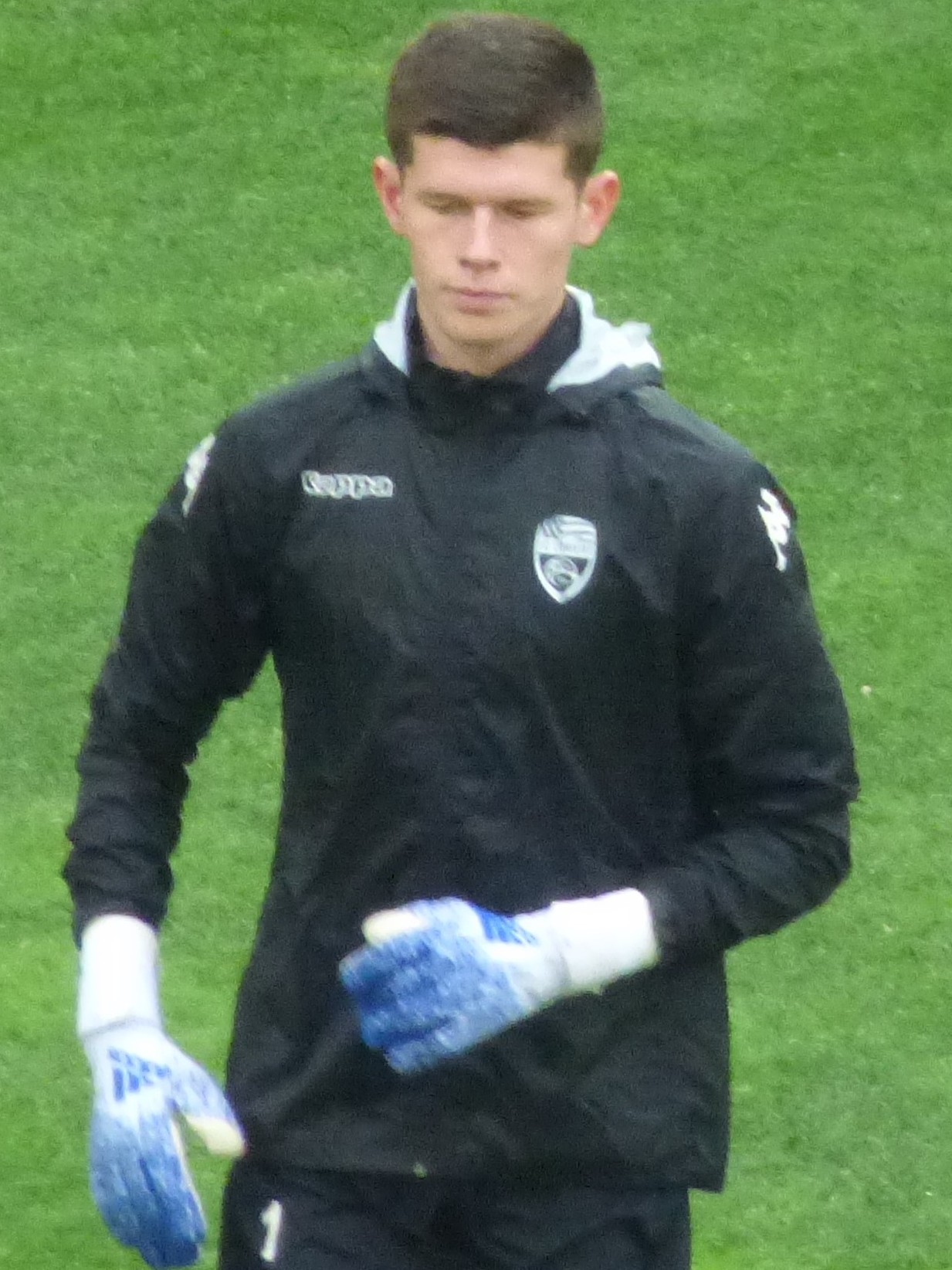
Leeds United's Illan Meslier shared the Golden Glove Award with West Bromwich Albion's Alex Palmer, with both goalkeepers keeping 18 clean sheets during the regular season.

Rank	Player	Club	Clean sheets
1	(France) Illan Meslier^{2}	Leeds United	20
2	(England) Alex Palmer^{1}	West Bromwich Albion	19
3	(Czech Republic) Václav Hladký	Ipswich Town	15
4	(Bosnia and Herzegovina) Asmir Begović	Queens Park Rangers	13
4	(Denmark) Mads Hermansen	Leicester City	13
4	(Republic of Ireland) Max O'Leary	Bristol City	13
4	(England) Anthony Patterson	Sunderland	13
8	(Scotland) Angus Gunn^{1}	Norwich City	12
8	(Montenegro) Matija Sarkic	Millwall	12

- ^{1} Includes 1 clean sheet in The Championship play-offs.
- ^{2} Includes 2 clean sheets in The Championship play-offs.

=== Discipline ===
==== Player ====
- Most yellow cards: 14
  - (Egypt) Sam Morsy (Ipswich Town)
  - (Scotland) Ryan Porteous (Watford)
- Most red cards: 3
  - (England) Liam Kitching (Coventry City)

==== Club ====
- Most yellow cards: 110
  - Preston North End
- Most red cards: 5
  - Blackburn Rovers
  - Sheffield Wednesday
- Fewest yellow cards: 71
  - Bristol City
- Fewest red cards: 0
  - Ipswich Town

== Awards ==
=== Monthly ===
Month	Manager of the Month		Player of the Month		Reference
August	(Italy) Enzo Maresca	Leicester City	(Brazil) Gabriel Sara	Norwich City	
September	(Northern Ireland) Kieran McKenna	Ipswich Town	(England) Jack Clarke	Sunderland	
October	(Italy) Enzo Maresca	Leicester City	(Netherlands) Crysencio Summerville	Leeds United	
November	(Germany) Daniel Farke	Leeds United	(Republic of Ireland) Sammie Szmodics	Blackburn Rovers	
December	(Italy) Enzo Maresca	Leicester City	(England) Stephy Mavididi	Leicester City	
January	(Germany) Daniel Farke	Leeds United	(England) Morgan Whittaker	Plymouth Argyle	
February	(Germany) Daniel Farke	Leeds United	(England) Omari Hutchinson	Ipswich Town	
March	(Northern Ireland) Kieran McKenna	Ipswich Town	(Republic of Ireland) Mikey Johnston	West Bromwich Albion	
April	(Italy) Enzo Maresca	Leicester City	(Ivory Coast) Emmanuel Latte Lath	Middlesbrough	

=== Annual ===
Award	Winner	Club
Player of the Season	(Netherlands) Crysencio Summerville	Leeds United
Young Player of the Season	(England) Archie Gray	Leeds United
Apprentice of the Season	(England) Archie Gray	Leeds United

Championship Team of the Season

Pos.	Player	Club	Ref.
GK	(Denmark) Mads Hermansen	Leicester City	
RB	(England) Kyle Walker-Peters	Southampton	
CB	(Wales) Ethan Ampadu	Leeds United	
CB	(England) Jacob Greaves	Hull City	
LB	(England) Leif Davis	Ipswich Town	
CM	(Brazil) Gabriel Sara	Norwich City	
CM	(England) Kiernan Dewsbury-Hall	Leicester City	
FW	(England) Morgan Whittaker	Plymouth Argyle	
FW	(Netherlands) Crysencio Summerville	Leeds United	
FW	(Republic of Ireland) Sammie Szmodics	Blackburn Rovers	
FW	(France) Georginio Rutter	Leeds United	
Manager	(Northern Ireland) Kieran McKenna	Ipswich Town	

== Attendances ==
Sunderland drew the highest average home attendance in the 2023–24 edition of the EFL Championship.

#	Football club	Home games	Average attendance
1	Sunderland	23	41,028
2	Leeds United	23	35,989
3	Leicester City	23	31,238
4	Southampton	23	29,373
5	Ipswich Town	23	28,845
6	Middlesbrough	23	26,905
7	Sheffield Wednesday	23	26,762
8	Norwich City	23	26,077
9	Coventry City	23	25,468
10	West Bromwich Albion	23	24,057
11	Bristol City	23	22,813
12	Stoke City	23	22,742
13	Hull City	23	21,980
14	Cardiff City	23	21,213
15	Birmingham City	23	21,180
16	Huddersfield Town	23	19,418
17	Watford	23	18,876
18	Preston North End	23	16,720
19	Queens Park Rangers	23	16,678
20	Swansea City	23	16,574
21	Millwall	23	16,540
22	Plymouth Argyle	23	16,507
23	Blackburn Rovers	23	15,583
24	Rotherham United	23	10,674
