= 2026–27 Bury F.C. season =

Bury
2026–27 season
- Chairman: Gareth Castick
- Manager: Anthony Johnson
- Stadium: Gigg Lane
- NPL Premier Division: 8th
- FA Cup: 4th Qualifying Round Replay
- FA Trophy: 2nd Round
- Top goalscorer: League: (Wales) Kai Evans (6 Goals); All: (Wales) Kai Evans (13 Goals)
- Highest home attendance: 4,910 vs Harrogate Town 17 October 2026 (FA Cup); 3,640 vs Redcar Athletic 21 November 2026
- Lowest home attendance: 2,959 vs Avro 3 November 2026; 1,933 vs Gainsborough Trinity 26 September 2026 (FA Trophy)
- Average home league attendance: 3,358
- Biggest win: Bury 8–0 Wythenshawe 5 September 2026 FA Cup; Bury 7–0 Ilkeston Town 29 August 2026
- Biggest defeat: Darlington 4–0 Bury 14 November 2026 (FA Trophy)
- All statistics correct as of 21 November 2026.

The 2026–27 season is Bury F.C.'s first in the Northern Premier League Premier Division, following their promotion the previous season.

== Transfers and contracts ==
=== In ===
Date from	Position	Nationality	Name	From	Fee	Ref.
13 May 2026	FW	(England)	Anthony Dudley	(England) Radcliffe	Free	
13 May 2026	CM	(England)	George Glendon	(England) Radcliffe	Free	
3 June 2026	DF	(England)	James Melhado	(England) Warrington Town	Free	
6 July 2026	FW	(England)	Oliver Hodgson	(England) Bacup Borough	Free	
6 July 2026	GK	(England)	Bradley Sullivan	(England) Padiham	Free	
15 July 2026	MF	(England)	Freddie Machell	(England) Padiham	Free	
28 July 2026	LB	(Republic of Ireland)	John Clarke	(England) Reading	Free	
30 July 2026	LW	(Nigeria)	Jesurun Uchegbulam	(England) Matlock Town	Free	
7 August 2026	DF	(England)	Charlie Cox	(England) Ramsbottom United	Free	
7 August 2026	GK	(England)	Harvey Hampson	(England) Matlock Town	Free	
26 September 2026	CM	(England)	Daniel Adshead	(England) Boston United	Free	
17 October 2026	AM	(England)	Brad Mundy	(England) 1874 Northwich	Free	
17 October 2026	ST	(England)	Dom Telford	(England) Gateshead	Free	
22 October 2026	MF/FW	(England)	Ryley Smith	(England) Avro	Free	

=== Loaned In ===
Date from	Position	Nationality	Name	From	Date until	Ref.
6 November 2026	CB	(England)	Calum Hudson	(England) Barnsley	28 days December 4, 2026	

=== Loaned out ===
Date from	Position	Nationality	Name	To	Date until	Ref.
6 July 2026	GK	(England)	Bradley Sullivan	(England) Wythenshawe Town	End of Season	
15 July 2026	MF	(England)	Freddie Machell	(England) Clitheroe	January 2027	
30 July 2026	FW	(England)	Oliver Hodgson	(England) Longridge Town	Unknown	
7 August 2026	GK	(England)	Harvey Hampson	(England) Atherton Laburnum Rovers	Unknown	
11 September 2026	MF	(Nigeria)	Jesurun Uchegbulam	(England) Hyde United	December 2026	

=== Out ===
Date from	Position	Nationality	Name	Reason	To	Fee	Ref.
22 May 2026	ST	(England)	Lewis Rawsthorn	Transfer	(England) Stalybridge Celtic	Undisclosed	
5 June 2026	MF	(England)	Regan Riley	Mutual Departure	(England) Bamber Bridge	NA	
9 June 2026	MF	(Portugal)	Bebeto Gomes	Transfer	(England) Stafford Rangers	NA	
14 June 2026	GK	(England)	Russel Saunders	Mutual Departure	(England) Stafford Rangers	NA	
9 September 2026	DF	(England)	Aiden Walker	Mutual Consent	NA	NA	

=== Released / Out of Contract ===
Date	Position	Nationality	Name	Subsequent Club	Join Date	Ref.
28 April 2026	DF	(England)	Scott Duxbury	(England) Bradford (Park Avenue)	July 1, 2026	
1 May 2026	MF	(England)	Cameron Fogerty	(England) Stalybridge Celtic	July 1, 2026	
1 May 2026	MF	(England)	Brad Carroll	(England) Workington	July 1, 2026	
1 May 2026	MF	(England)	Callum Spooner	(England) Ashton United	July 1, 2026	
1 May 2026	FW	(England)	Gavin Massey	NA	NA	
1 May 2026	FW	(England)	Veron Parny	NA	NA	
1 May 2026	MF	(England)	Jordan Lazenbury	(England) Chadderton	July 1, 2026	

== Pre-season and friendlies ==
Win Draw Loss Fixtures

3 July 2026	Tottington United	0–3	Bury FC XI	Tottington
19:45 BST		Report	McCullion 45+1'; Evans 51'; Touray 72'	Stadium: Ideal Building Systems Stadium

6 July 2026	Bacup Borough	3–5	Bury	Bacup
19:45 BST	11'; 30'; 39'	Report	Hodgson 13'; Trialist A 15'; Touray 28', 34'; Gould 73'	Stadium: West View

11 July 2026	Clitheroe	2–2	Ashton Athletic	Clitheroe
12:00 BST	Dent 81', 88'	Report	Pedro 39', 76'	Stadium: EcoGiants Stadium

11 July 2026	Chorley	1–2	Bury	Chorley
15:00 BST	Whitehouse 11'	Report	Evans 49'; Threlkeld 73'	Stadium: Victory Park

13 July 2025	Elton Vale	1–2	Bury FC XI	Bury
19:30 BST	34'	Report	Hodgson 22'; Machell 58'	Stadium: Elton Vale Sports Club; Attendance: 664

17 July 2025	FC Isle of Man	1–3	Bury	Ramsey
19:30 BST	Pinnington 68'	Report	Touray 38'; Robinson 85'	Stadium: Ballacloan Stadium

19 July 2025	Bury	2–1	Radcliffe	Ramsey
19:30 BST	Carr 58'; Evans 70' (pen.)		Partington 76'	Stadium: Ballacloan Stadium

21 July 2025	Bury	4–0	Wigan Athletic	Bury
19:45 BST	Pedro 32'; Trialist H 64', 85'; Trialist C 89'	Report		Stadium: Gigg Lane; Attendance: 1,062

25 July 2025	Bury	0–2	Morecambe	Bury
15:00 BST		Report	Collis 1', 20'	Stadium: Gigg Lane; Attendance: 1,649

28 July 2025	Accrington Stanley	1–0	Bury	Accrington
19:30 BST	Caton 55'	Report		Stadium: Wham Stadium; Attendance: 959

1 August 2025	Bury	3–1	Radcliffe	Bury
15:00 BST	Carr 13'; White 84'; Touray 87'	Report	Hulme 20'	Stadium: Gigg Lane; Attendance: 2,361

== Competitions ==
=== Overall record ===
Competition	First match	Last match	Starting round	Final position	Record							
Competition	First match	Last match	Starting round	Final position	Pld	W	D	L	GF	GA	GD	Win %
NPL Premier Division	8 August 2026	17 April 2026	Matchday 1	TBD	18	9	3	6	38	24	+14	50.00
FA Cup	5 September 2026	20 October 2026	First qualifying round	Fourth Qualifying Round Replay	5	3	1	1	17	6	+11	60.00
FA Trophy	26 September 2026	TBD	Second round Proper	TBD	3	1	1	1	6	7	−1	33.33
Manchester Cup	TBA	TBA	TBD	TBA	0	0	0	0	0	0	+0	—
Total					26	13	5	8	61	37	+24	50.00

Last updated: 21 November 2026
Source: Competitions

=== Northern Premier League Premier Division ===
==== League table ====
Pos	Team	Pld	W	D	L	GF	GA	GD	Pts	Promotion, qualification or relegation
6	Avro	19	11	2	6	46	34	+12	35	Qualification for the play-off quarter-finals (Note: Six teams play for one spot and promotion to the National League North)
7	Gainsborough Trinity	19	10	2	7	36	28	+8	32	Qualification for the play-off quarter-finals
8	Bury	18	9	3	6	38	25	+13	30	
9	Workington	19	9	3	7	32	29	+3	30	
10	Warrington Town	18	8	5	5	31	26	+5	29	

Updated to match(es) played on 21 November 2026. Source: NPL official site
Rules for classification: 1) points; 2) goal difference; 3) number of goals scored; 4) number of matches won; 5) head-to-head results

==== Matches ====
Win Draw Loss Fixtures

8 August 2026 1	Redcar Athletic	0–0	Bury	Redcar
15:00 BST	Rowe (yellow card) 25'; Hawkins (yellow card) 25'	Report	White (yellow card) 26'; Pedro (yellow card) 32'; Sloane (yellow card) 56'	Stadium: Green Lane; Attendance: 1,417; Referee: Thomas James

11 August 2026 2	Bury	3–2	Curzon Ashton	Bury
19:45 BST	Carr 33'; Graham (yellow card) 63'; Touray 65'; Neild 76' (yellow card) 89'	Report	Weston 41', 45'; Roberts (yellow card) 63'; Nolan (yellow card) 78'	Stadium: Gigg Lane; Attendance: 3,496; Referee: Umar Ahmed

15 August 2026 3	Bury	1–0	Warrington Rylands 1906	Bury
19:45 BST	Pedro 31' (red card) 90+5'; Graham (yellow card) 79'; Sloane (yellow card) 80'; Navarro (yellow card) 88'	Report	Hall (yellow card) 90+5'; Hardcastle (yellow card) 90+5'	Stadium: Gigg Lane; Attendance: 3,637; Referee: Ciaran Williams

18 August 2026 4	Guiseley	3–2	Bury	Guiseley
15:00 BST	Martin 26', 32' (yellow card) 88'; Thewlis 90'; Staniland (yellow card) 90+4'	Report	Pedro 3'; Evans 7'; Isherwood (yellow card) 90'	Stadium: Nethermoor Park; Attendance: 1,370; Referee: Joseph Morrell

22 August 2026 5	Gainsborough Trinity	0–1	Bury	Gainsborough
15:00 BST	Brown (yellow card) 66'		Sloane 89'	Stadium: The Northolme; Attendance: 1,288

25 August 2026 6	Bury	0–1	Lancaster City	Bury
15:00 BST	Isherwood (yellow card) 45+1'; Sloane (yellow card) 79'	Report	Yawson 10'; Sanogo (yellow card) 68'	Stadium: Gigg Lane; Attendance: 3,467; Referee: Adam Watson

29 August 2026 7	Bury	7–0	Ilkeston Town	Bury
15:00 BST	Robinson 19'; Evans 22' (pen.); Graham 25', 54'; Carr 38', 89' (pen.); Touray 64'	Report	Joyce (yellow card) 11'	Stadium: Gigg Lane; Attendance: 3,322; Referee: Alexander Beckett

31 August 2026 8	Hyde United	2–1	Bury	Hyde
15:00 BST	McCarthy 22'; Ditchfield (yellow card) 40'; Gardner (yellow card) 42'; Redshaw 70'; Martin (yellow card) 73'	Report	Glendon 45+1'	Stadium: Ewen Fields; Attendance: 2,167; Referee: Adam Boubrahmi

12 September 2026 9	Bury	4–0	Emley AFC	Bury
15:00 BST	Robinson 26'; Carr 30'; Evans 36', 53'	Report	Lindley (yellow card) 36'	Stadium: Gigg Lane; Attendance: 3,471; Referee: Tom Wall

6 October 2026 12	Stockton Town	1–0	Bury	Stockton-on-Tees
19:45 BST	Rooney (yellow card) 31'; Nouble 89'	Report	Sloane (yellow card) 69'	Stadium: Bishopton Road West; Attendance: 785; Referee: Thomas James

10 October 2026 13	Alfreton Town	2–3	Bury	Alfreton
19:45 BST	Ligendza 45'; Robson (yellow card) 52'; Odunaiya 68'; Grumley (yellow card) 84'	Report	Stepans 18' (yellow card) 89'; Robinson 24' (pen.) (yellow card) 67'; Evans (yellow card) 82'; Pedro 88'	Stadium: North Street; Attendance: 982; Referee: Callum Timperley

13 October 2026 14	Bury	P–P	Leek Town	Bury
15:00 BST				Stadium: Gigg Lane
Note: match was postponed

17 October 2026 15	Bury	P–P	Cleethorpes Town	Bury
15:00 BST				Stadium: Gigg Lane
Note: match was postponed due to Bury's advancement in the FA Cup Qualifying Rounds

20 October 2026 10	Quorn	P–P	Bury	Quorn
15:00 BST				Stadium: Farley Way Stadium
Note: Match was originally scheduled for 19 September 2026, but was postponed due to Bury's advancement in the FA Cup Qualifying Rounds, then was postponed again due to Bury's 4th qualifying round Replay at Harrogate Town

24 October 2026 16	Warrington Town	P–P	Bury	Warrington
15:00 GMT				Stadium: Cantilever Park
Note: match was postponed due to Bury's advancement in the FA Trophy

27 October 2026 14	Bury	5–3	Leek Town	Bury
19:45 BST	Robinson 20'; Evans 24', 30'; Carroll (yellow card) 47'; Touray 65'; Telford 73'	Report	Buckley (yellow card) 30'; Holding (yellow card) 54'; Griffiths 77'; Weir 79' (yellow card) 81'; Pantner (yellow card) 82'; Hurst 88' (pen.)	Stadium: Gigg Lane; Attendance: 3,016; Referee: Jason Smith

31 October 2026 17	Bury	1–2	Workington	Bury
15:00 GMT	Neild (yellow card) 50'; Touray 54'; Threlkeld (red card) 61'	Report	Dickenson (yellow card) 45+2'; Rigby 58'; Stephenson 65'	Stadium: Gigg Lane; Attendance: 3,514; Referee: Adam Watson

3 November 2026 11	Bury	2–2	Avro	Bury
19:45 BST	Melhado 48'; Graham 50'; Pedro (yellow card) 68'		Lowe 43', 46'; Harrop (yellow card) 54'; Hickman (yellow card) 72'; Kenny (yellow card) 82'	Stadium: Gigg Lane; Attendance: 2,959; Referee: Daniel McDonald
Note: Match was originally scheduled for 3 October 2026, but was postponed due to Bury's advancement in the FA Cup Qualifying Rounds

7 November 2026 18	Bamber Bridge	0–1	Bury	Bamber Bridge
19:45 GMT	Molloy (red card) 41'; Broughton (yellow card) 87'	Report	Isherwood 45+2'	Stadium: Irongate; Attendance: 1,419; Referee: Ben Cotton

10 November 2026 15	Bury	1–0	Cleethorpes Town	Bury
15:00 BST	Robinson (yellow card) 36'; Stepans 90'; Carr (yellow card) 90+2'	Report	Ravenhill (red card) 39'; Bramwell (yellow card) 44'; (yellow card) 77'; Battersby (yellow card) 87'	Stadium: Gigg Lane; Attendance: 3,061; Referee: Christopher Porter
Note: match was originally postponed due to Bury's advancement in the FA Cup Qualifying Rounds

14 November 2026 19	Ashton United	P–P	Bury	Ashton-under-Lyne
15:00 GMT				Stadium: Hurst Cross
Note: match was postponed due to Bury's advancement to the 2nd round of the FA Trophy

17 November 2026 10	Quorn	5–4	Bury	Quorn
19:45 BST	Beswick (yellow card) 2'; Goodson 20', 48', 60'; Friend 45', 87'; Pennant (yellow card) 56'; Shaw (yellow card) 69'	Report	Graham 17', 25' (yellow card) 69'; Hudson (yellow card) 23'; Robinson 38'; Nield (yellow card) 62'; Stepans 90+1'	Stadium: Farley Way Stadium; Attendance: 742; Referee: Benjamin Stott
Note: Match was originally scheduled for 19 September 2026, but was postponed due to Bury's advancement in the FA Cup Qualifying Rounds, then was postponed again due to Bury's 4th qualifying round Replay at Harrogate Town

21 November 2026 20	Bury	2–2	Redcar Athletic	Bury
15:00 GMT	Pedro 55'; Stepans 57'; Melhado (yellow card) 87'		Fletcher 18', 38' (yellow card) 55'	Stadium: Gigg Lane; Attendance: 3,640; Referee: Francis Sibley

28 November 2026 21	Curzon Ashton	v	Bury	Ashton-under-Lyne
15:00 GMT				Stadium: Tameside Stadium

5 December 2026 22	Bury	v	Guiseley	Bury
15:00 GMT				Stadium: Gigg Lane

12 December 2026 23	Ilkeston Town	v	Bury	Ilkeston
15:00 GMT				Stadium: New Manor Ground

19 December 2026 24	Bury	v	Whitby Town	Bury
15:00 GMT				Stadium: Gigg Lane

26 December 2026 25	FC United of Manchester	v	Bury	Moston
15:00 GMT				Stadium: Broadhurst Park

2 January 2027 26	Bury	v	Hyde United	Bury
15:00 GMT				Stadium: Gigg Lane

9 January 2027 27	Bury	v	Ashton United	Bury
15:00 GMT				Stadium: Gigg Lane

16 January 2027 28	Warrington Rylands 1906	v	Bury	Warrington
15:00 GMT				Stadium: Gorsey Lane

23 January 2027 29	Emley AFC	v	Bury	Emley
15:00 GMT				Stadium: Fantastic Media Welfare Ground

30 January 2027 30	Bury	v	Quorn	Bury
15:00 GMT				Stadium: Gigg Lane

6 February 2027 31	Avro	v	Bury	Oldham
15:00 GMT				Stadium: Whitebank Stadium

13 February 2027 32	Bury	v	Stockton Town	Bury
15:00 GMT				Stadium: Gigg Lane

20 February 2027 33	Leek Town	v	Bury	Leek
15:00 GMT				Stadium: Harrison Park

27 February 2027 34	Bury	v	Stockton Town	Bury
15:00 GMT				Stadium: Gigg Lane

6 March 2027 35	Cleethorpes Town	v	Bury	Grimsby
15:00 GMT				Stadium: Clee Road

13 March 2027 36	Bury	v	Warrington Town	Bury
15:00 GMT				Stadium: Gigg Lane

20 March 2027 37	Bury	v	Gainsborough Trinity	Bury
15:00 GMT				Stadium: Gigg Lane

26 March 2027 38	Lancaster City	v	Bury	Lancaster
15:00 BST				Stadium: The Giant Axe

29 March 2027 39	Bury	v	FC United of Manchester	Bury
15:00 BST				Stadium: Gigg Lane

3 April 2027 40	Whitby Town	v	Nantwich Town	Whitby
15:00 BST				Stadium: Turnbull Ground

10 April 2027 41	Workington	v	Bury	Workington
15:00 BST				Stadium: Borough Park

17 April 2027 42	Bury	v	Bamber Bridge	Bury
15:00 BST				Stadium: Gigg Lane

=== F.A. Cup ===
Win Draw Loss Fixtures

5 September 2026 1st Qualifying Round	Bury	8–0	Wythenshawe	Bury
15:00 BST	Pye 31', 45+4'; Carr 37'; Evans 41', 44', 77'; Touray 45+1'; Robinson 49'			Stadium: Gigg Lane; Attendance: 2,332

19 September 2026 2nd Qualifying Round	Bury	5–1	Workington	Bury
15:00 BST	Evans 39', 45+4'; Touray 59', 64'; Stepans 84'		Grayson 17'	Stadium: Gigg Lane; Attendance: 2,532

3 October 2026 3rd Qualifying Round	Bury	2–1	Bromsgrove Sporting	Bury
15:00 BST	Glendon 7'; Touray 59'; Carroll (yellow card) 62'		Doyle-Charles (yellow card) 52'; Harrison 90+1'	Stadium: Gigg Lane; Attendance: 3,342

17 October 2026 4th Qualifying Round	Bury	1–1	Harrogate Town	Bury
12:30 BST	Neild (yellow card) 7'; Evans 41'; Sloane (yellow card); Robinson (yellow card)		McGuckin 39'; Craig (yellow card) 45'; Hmami (yellow card) 63'; McGowan (yellow card) 76'	Stadium: Gigg Lane; Attendance: 4,910

20 October 2026 4th Qualifying Round Replay	Harrogate Town	3–1	Bury	Harrogate
19:45 BST	Dolaghan 12'; Hmami (yellow card) 65'; Taylor 88', 90+4'		Touray 68'	Stadium: Wetherby Road; Attendance: 2,610

=== FA Trophy ===
Win Draw Loss Fixtures

26 September 2026 3rd Qualifying Round	Bury	3–3 (6–5 p)	Gainsborough Trinity	Bury
15:00 BST	Dudley 24' (yellow card) 27'; Isherwood (yellow card) 50'; Navarro 55'; Evans 89'	Report	Butroid 71' (pen.); Simpson 90+3'; Kokkinos 90+5'	Stadium: Gigg Lane; Attendance: 1,933; Referee: Declan O'Regan
	Penalties
	Robinson (penalty scored); Dudley (penalty scored); Glendon (penalty scored); Sloane (penalty scored); Evans (penalty missed); Melhado (penalty scored); Pye (penalty scored)		(penalty scored) Butroid; (penalty missed) Williams; (penalty scored) Jackson; (penalty scored) Simpson; (penalty missed) Kokkinos

24 October 2026 1st Round	Bury	3–0	Prescott Cables	Bury
15:00 BST	Glendon 6'; Telford 26'; Pedro 65'	Report		Stadium: Gigg Lane; Attendance: 1,970; Referee: Neil Howlett

14 November 2026 2nd Round	Darlington	4–0	Bury	Darlington
15:00 BST	Beck 2', 65', 69', 75'	Report		Stadium: Blackwell Meadows; Attendance: 1,717; Referee: Luke Hood

=== Manchester Premier Cup ===
Win Draw Loss Fixtures

2026	v
15:00 BST

== Squad statistics ==
=== Appearances and goals ===
As of 21 November 2026

No.	Pos	Nat	Player	Total		NPL PD		FA Cup		FA Trophy		Manchester Cup	
No.	Pos	Nat	Player	Apps	Goals	Apps	Goals	Apps	Goals	Apps	Goals	Apps	Goals
1	GK	(England) ENG	Mitch Allen	26	0	18+0	0	5+0	0	3+0	0	0+0	0
	DF	(England) ENG	Aiden Walker	1	0	0+0	0	0+1	0	0+0	0	0+0	0
	DF	(England) ENG	Connor Pye	16	2	3+8	0	3+0	2	2+0	0	0+0	0
6	DF	(England) ENG	James Neild	23	1	17+1	1	5+0	0	0+0	0	0+0	0
	DF	(Republic of Ireland) IRL	John Clarke	0	0	0+0	0	0+0	0	0+0	0	0+0	0
	DF	(England) ENG	Charlie Cox	0	0	0+0	0	0+0	0	0+0	0	0+0	0
2	DF	(England) ENG	James Melhado	23	1	8+7	1	1+4	0	3+0	0	0+0	0
3	DF	(England) ENG	Bailey Sloane	19	1	15+0	1	3+0	0	1+0	0	0+0	0
	DF	(England) ENG	Testimony Igbinoghene	1	0	0+0	0	0+0	0	1+0	0	0+0	0
	DF	(England) ENG	Ollie Younger	0	0	0+0	0	0+0	0	0+0	0	0+0	0
	DF	(England) ENG	Louis Isherwood	20	1	9+5	1	2+2	0	2+0	0	0+0	0
	DF	(England) ENG	Calum Hudson	5	0	4+0	0	0+0	0	1+0	0	0+0	0
	MF	(England) ENG	Daniel Adshead	2	0	0+0	0	0+0	0	2+0	0	0+0	0
	MF	(England) ENG	Bobby Carroll	15	0	10+0	0	5+0	0	0+0	0	0+0	0
	MF	(England) ENG	Louis White	1	0	1+0	0	0+0	0	0+0	0	0+0	0
4	MF	(England) ENG	Leo Graham	23	5	18+0	5	4+0	0	1+0	0	0+0	0
	MF	(England) ENG	Luca Navarro	11	1	1+7	0	0+2	0	1+0	1	0+0	0
7	MF	(England) ENG	Owen Robinson	24	6	16+1	5	5+0	1	1+1	0	0+0	0
	MF	(England) ENG	Ryley Smith	3	0	3+0	0	0+0	0	0+0	0	0+0	0
8	MF	(England) ENG	George Glendon	21	3	8+7	1	3+0	1	3+0	1	0+0	0
	MF	(Nigeria) NGR	Jesurun Uchegbulam	6	0	0+5	0	0+1	0	0+0	0	0+0	0
5	MF	(England) ENG	Oscar Threlkeld	16	0	11+0	0	5+0	0	0+0	0	0+0	0
	MF	(England) ENG	Brad Mundy	0	0	0+0	0	0+0	0	0+0	0	0+0	0
	DF	(Democratic Republic of the Congo) COD	Toto Nsiala	0	0	0+0	0	0+0	0	0+0	0	0+0	0
9	FW	(England) ENG	Djavan Pedro	17	5	9+4	4	0+2	0	2+0	1	0+0	0
11	FW	(Latvia) LAT	Rustam Stepans	21	5	14+1	4	1+3	1	2+0	0	0+0	0
	FW	(England) ENG	Anthony Dudley	8	1	1+4	0	0+2	0	1+0	1	0+0	0
	FW	(Wales) WAL	Momodou Touray	23	9	9+6	4	4+1	5	2+1	0	0+0	0
10	FW	(England) ENG	Tom Carr	22	5	12+5	4	3+0	1	1+1	0	0+0	0
	FW	(Wales) WAL	Kai Evans	19	13	10+2	6	5+0	6	0+2	1	0+0	0
	FW	(England) ENG	Oliver Hodgson	0	0	0+0	0	0+0	0	0+0	0	0+0	0
	FW	(England) ENG	Dom Telford	7	2	1+4	1	0+0	0	2+0	1	0+0	0
	FW	(England) ENG	Murat Aydogan	2	0	0+1	0	0+0	0	1+0	0	0+0	0
	MF	(England) ENG	Liam Gould	1	0	0+0	0	0+0	0	0+1	0	0+0	0
	DF	(England) ENG	Charlie Cox	1	0	0+0	0	0+0	0	0+1	0	0+0	0
	DF	(England) ENG	Harrison Aubrey-Williams	2	0	0+0	0	0+0	0	0+2	0	0+0	0
	MF	(England) ENG	Brad Mundy	3	0	0+1	0	0+0	0	0+2	0	0+0	0
	FW	(England) ENG	Tyler James	0	0	0+0	0	0+0	0	0+0	0	0+0	0
	MF	(England) ENG	Harry Connolly	1	0	0+0	0	0+0	0	0+1	0	0+0	0
	DF	(England) ENG	Aaron Potter	1	0	0+0	0	0+0	0	0+1	0	0+0	0
	FW	(England) ENG	Charlie Jackson	1	0	0+0	0	0+1	0	0+0	0	0+0	0
