= 2022–23 Salford City F.C. season =

Salford City
2022–23 season
- Owner: Project 92 Ltd.
- Chairman: Karen Baird
- Manager: Neil Wood
- Stadium: Peninsula Stadium
- League Two: 7th
- FA Cup: First round
- EFL Cup: First round
- EFL Trophy: Quarter-finals
- Top goalscorer: League: Conor McAleny (9); All: Conor McAleny; Matt Smith (both 9)
- Highest home attendance: 3,924 (vs. Bradford City, 15 October)
- Lowest home attendance: 578 (vs. Bradford City, 22 November)
- Average home league attendance: 2,427
- Biggest win: 5–2 (vs. Mansfield Town, 25 February)
- Biggest defeat: 1–5 (vs. Bolton Wanderers, 9 August)

The 2022–23 season is the 83rd season in the existence of Salford City Football Club and the club's fourth consecutive season in League Two. In addition to the league, they will also compete in the 2022–23 FA Cup, the 2022–23 EFL Cup and the 2022–23 EFL Trophy.

== Transfers ==
=== In ===
Date	Pos	Player	Transferred from	Fee	Ref
28 June 2022	CM	(Scotland) Elliot Watt	(England) Bradford City	Undisclosed	
1 July 2022 (Note: The transfer was announced on 17 June, and would become official on July 1 once his St Johnstone contract expired)	CF	(Scotland) Callum Hendry	(Scotland) St Johnstone	Free Transfer	
1 July 2022	CM	(Scotland) Stevie Mallan	(Turkey) Yeni Malatyaspor	Free Transfer	
8 July 2022	CB	(Republic of Ireland) Josh O'Brien	(England) Watford	Free Transfer	
8 July 2022	CF	(Republic of Ireland) Colin Oppong	(England) Ipswich Town	Free Transfer	
8 July 2022	CM	(England) Adam Porter	(England) Stoke City	Free Transfer	
18 July 2022	CB	(Wales) Ryan Leak	(England) Burton Albion	Undisclosed	
22 July 2022	AM	(Angola) Elliot Simões	(France) Nancy	Undisclosed	
26 July 2022	CB	(England) Richard Nartey	(England) Burnley	Free Transfer	
1 September 2022	AM	(England) Odin Bailey	(England) Birmingham City	Undisclosed	
13 January 2023	CF	(England) Callum Morton	(England) Fleetwood Town	Undisclosed	
26 January 2023	RM	(Republic of Ireland) Shane McLoughlin	(England) Morecambe	Free Transfer	
23 March 2023	CB	(Jamaica) Adrian Mariappa	Free agent	—N/a	

=== Out ===
Date	Pos	Player	Transferred to	Fee	Ref
30 June 2022	CB	(France) Cerny Ando	Unattached	Released	
30 June 2022	CM	(England) Luke Burgess	(England) Oldham Athletic	Released	
30 June 2022	CM	(England) Hayden Campbell	Unattached	Released	
30 June 2022	CF	(England) Tom Elliott	Unattached	Released	
30 June 2022	CF	(England) Oli Fannon	Unattached	Released	
30 June 2022	RB	(United States) Tylor Golden	(England) Halifax Town	Released	
30 June 2022	CF	(England) Ian Henderson	(England) Rochdale	Released	
30 June 2022	LW	(England) Ashley Hunter	(England) Morecambe	Released	
30 June 2022	CM	(England) Liam Loughlan	Unattached	Released	
30 June 2022 (Note: The transfer was announced on 16 June, and would become official once his contract at the club expired)	RB	(Scotland) Donald Love	(England) Morecambe	Free transfer	
30 June 2022	CM	(England) Ben Rydel	(England) Radcliffe	Released	
30 June 2022	DF	(England) Anton Smith	Unattached	Released	
30 June 2022	CF	(Wales) Momodou Touray	(England) Marine	Released	
30 June 2022	CM	(Montserrat) Matty Willock	Unattached	Released	
11 July 2022	LM	(England) Josh Morris	(Scotland) Motherwell	Mutual consent	
26 July 2022	CB	(England) Jordan Turnbull	(England) Tranmere Rovers	Free Transfer	
2 August 2022	MF	(England) Donovan Lescott	(England) Blackpool	Undisclosed	
31 August 2022	CF	(England) Brandon Thomas-Asante	(England) West Bromwich Albion	Undisclosed	
14 January 2023	GK	(Wales) Tom King	(England) Northampton Town	Undisclosed	

=== Loans in ===
Date	Pos	Player	Loaned from	On loan until	Ref
23 August 2022	CF	(Switzerland) Lorent Tolaj	(England) Brighton & Hove Albion	31 January 2023 (Note: On 31 January, Tolaj was recalled to Brighton)	
26 August 2022	DM	(England) Jack Jenkins	(England) Leeds United	End of Season	
1 September 2022	GK	(Australia) Jacob Chapman	(England) Huddersfield Town	1 January 2023	
1 September 2022	CM	(Northern Ireland) Ethan Galbraith	(England) Manchester United	End of Season	
4 January 2023	GK	(England) Alex Cairns	(England) Fleetwood Town	End of Season	
30 January 2023	LW	(England) Louie Barry	(England) Aston Villa	End of Season	
31 January 2023	GK	(Uganda) Giosue Bellagambi	(England) Huddersfield Town	End of Season	

=== Loans out ===
Date	Pos	Player	Loaned to	On loan until	Ref
15 August 2022	MF	(England) Djavan Pedro	(England) Marine	1 January 2023	
20 August 2022	CF	(Republic of Ireland) Colin Oppong	(England) Boston United	20 September 2022	
3 September 2022	CM	(Wales) Matt Sargent	(England) Buxton	1 January 2023	(Note: On 7 October, Sargent's loan at Buxton was extended until January.)
8 September 2022	CF	(Wales) Marcus Dackers	(England) Southend United	8 October 2022	
29 September 2022	RW	(England) Kelly Nmai	(England) Warrington Rylands	6 February 2023 (Note: On 2 December, Nmai's loan at Warrington was extended by a further month) (Note: On 6 January, Nmai's loan at Warrington was extended again)	
7 October 2022	GK	(England) Joel Torrance	(England) Warrington Rylands	1 January 2023	
25 November 2022	RB	(England) James Melhado	(England) Hereford	1 January 2023	
2 December 2022	CF	(Republic of Ireland) Colin Oppong	(England) Truro City	1 January 2023	
12 December 2022	CB	(Republic of Ireland) Josh O'Brien	(England) AFC Telford United	14 March 2023 (Note: On 10 January, O'Brien's loan at Telford was extended by a further month. On February 14, the loan was extended again by a further month)	
6 January 2023	CF	(Wales) Marcus Dackers	(England) Woking	End of Season	
20 January 2023	CF	(England) Djavan Pedro	(England) Stalybridge Celtic	End of season	
26 January 2023	DF	(England) Jacob Lara	(England) Stalybridge Celtic	Work Experience	
28 January 2023	CF	(Republic of Ireland) Colin Oppong	(England) Hereford	25 February 2023	
17 February 2023	MF	(England) Alfie Henderson	(England) Stalybridge Celtic	End of Season	
24 February 2023	CM	(Wales) Matt Sargent	(England) Warrington Rylands	21 April 2023	
1 March 2023	RW	(England) Kelly Nmai	(England) Chester	End of Season	
1 March 2023	GK	(England) Joel Torrance	(England) Skelmersdale United	End of Season	
3 March 2023	LB	(England) Kevin Berkoe	(England) Maidstone United	End of Season	
17 March 2023	CF	(Republic of Ireland) Colin Oppong	(England) Warrington Rylands	End of Season	
17 March 2023	CM	(England) Adam Porter	(England) Ashton United	End of Season	
23 March 2023	MF	(England) Liam Humbles	(England) Nantwich Town	End of Season	

== Pre-season and friendlies ==
On May 24, Salford City announced their first pre-season fixture, with a trip to Chorley scheduled for 12 July. Two days later, a home friendly against Blackpool was confirmed. A third friendly match was confirmed, against Warrington Rylands 1906. On 7 June, a second home pre-season match, against Rotherham United was added to the schedule. A further two matches were added to the schedule, against Newcastle Town and Barrow. On July 12, the Ammies announced they would take part in two out of three 45-minute games against Hertha BSC and FC Halifax Town behind-closed-doors at St George's Park National Football Centre.

Win Draw Loss Fixtures

2 July 2022 Friendly	Newcastle Town	1–3	Salford City	Newcastle-under-Lyme
15:00 BST		Report	Smith 4', 28'; Thomas-Asante 55'	Stadium: Lyme Valley Park

9 July 2022 Friendly	Warrington Rylands 1906	2–7	Salford City	Warrington
15:00 BST	Trialist (?)	Report	McAleny (?); Thomas-Asante (?); Dackers (?); Lund (?); Watson (?)	Stadium: Gorsey Lane

12 July 2022 Friendly	Chorley	3–0	Salford City	Chorley
19:45 BST	Johnson 23'; Wilson 37'; Hall 41'			Stadium: Victory Park

13 July 2022 Friendly	Salford City	1–1	Rotherham United	Salford
19:00 BST	McAleny 15'		Kayode 90+1'	Stadium: Peninsula Stadium

16 July 2022 Friendly	Salford City	0–1	Hertha BSC	Burton upon Trent
TBA BST		Report	Torunarigha 28'	Stadium: St George's Park National Football Centre; Attendance: 0 (behind-closed-doors)
Note: 45-minute match.

16 July 2022 Friendly	Salford City	3–0	FC Halifax Town	Burton upon Trent
TBA BST	Hendry (?); Watson 28'; McAleny (?)	Report		Stadium: St George's Park National Football Centre; Attendance: 0 (behind-closed-doors)
Note: 45-minute match.

19 July 2022 Friendly	Salford City	0–1	Blackpool	Salford
19:00 BST		Report	Yates 49'	Stadium: The Peninsula Stadium

23 July 2022 Friendly	Barrow	0-1	Salford City	Barrow-in-Furness
13:00 BST			Hendry 90'	Stadium: Holker Street

== Competitions ==
=== League Two ===
==== League table ====
Pos	Team	Pld	W	D	L	GF	GA	GD	Pts	Promotion, qualification or relegation
4	Stockport County	46	22	13	11	65	37	+28	79	Qualification for League Two play-offs
5	Carlisle United (O, P)	46	20	16	10	66	43	+23	76	Qualification for League Two play-offs
6	Bradford City	46	20	16	10	61	43	+18	76	Qualification for League Two play-offs
7	Salford City	46	22	9	15	72	54	+18	75	Qualification for League Two play-offs
8	Mansfield Town	46	21	12	13	72	55	+17	75	
9	Barrow	46	18	8	20	47	53	−6	62	
10	Swindon Town	46	16	13	17	61	55	+6	61	

Source: EFL Official Website
Rules for classification: 1) Points; 2) Goal difference; 3) Number of goals scored; 4) Head-to-head results; 5) Wins; 6) Away goals; 7) Penalty points (sec 9.5); 8) 12-point sending off offences
(O) Play-off winners; (P) Promoted

==== Results summary ====
Overall								Home						Away					
Pld	W	D	L	GF	GA	GD	Pts	W	D	L	GF	GA	GD	W	D	L	GF	GA	GD
46	22	9	15	72	54	+18	75	10	5	8	28	23	+5	12	4	7	44	31	+13

Last updated: 8 May 2023.
Source: [ Soccerway]

==== Results by round ====
Round	1	2	3	4	5	6	7	8	9	10	11	12	13	14	15	16	17	18	19	20	21	22	23	24	25	26	27	28	29	30	31	32	33	34	35	36	37	38	39	40	41	42	43	44	45	46
Ground	H	A	H	A	A	H	H	A	H	A	H	A	H	H	A	A	A	H	H	A	H	A	A	H	H	A	A	H	H	A	H	H	A	A	H	A	H	A	A	H	A	H	H	A	A	H
Result	W	D	W	W	L	W	D	W	L	W	D	W	L	L	W	L	L	D	L	W	D	W	L	W	W	D	L	W	W	L	D	L	W	D	W	L	W	W	D	L	W	L	W	W	W	L
Position	5	7	3	1	6	4	4	4	6	5	5	4	7	8	5	8	8	9	9	8	10	8	11	7	5	5	5	5	5	5	6	7	6	7	6	7	7	6	7	8	7	8	7	6	6	7

Updated to match(es) played on 8 May 2023. Source: [ Soccerway]
A = Away; H = Home; W = Win; D = Draw; L = Loss; P = Postponed

==== Matches ====
Win Draw Loss Fixtures

On 23 June, the league fixtures were announced.

30 July 2022 1	Salford City	2–0	Mansfield Town	Salford
15:00 BST	Hendry 5'; Thomas-Asante 28'; Lowe (yellow card) 36'; King (yellow card) 69'	Report		Stadium: The Peninsula Stadium; Attendance: 2,721; Referee: Adam Herczeg

6 August 2022 2	Swindon Town	0–0	Salford City	Swindon
15:00 BST	McKirdy (yellow card) 14' (yellow-red card) 43'; Baudry (yellow card) 15'; Shade (yellow card) 19'; Wakeling (yellow card) 36'; Reed (yellow card) 55'; Darcy (yellow card) 69'; MacDonald (yellow card) 74'	Report	Bolton (yellow card) 58'	Stadium: The County Ground; Attendance: 9,158; Referee: Andy Woolmer

13 August 2022 3	Salford City	3–0	Crewe Alexandra	Salford
15:00 BST	Nartey (yellow card) 14'; McAleny 17'; Watt (yellow card) 44'; Thomas-Asante 50', 53'	Report	Mellor (yellow card) 29'; Sambou (red card) 31'; Baker-Richardson (yellow card) 90+2'	Stadium: Moor Lane; Attendance: 2,119; Referee: Craig Hicks

16 August 2022 4	Newport County	2–3	Salford City	Newport
19:45 BST	Demetriou (yellow card) 18'; Lewis (yellow card) 39'; Bennett 72'; Bogle (yellow card) 73', (goal) 75'	Report	Nartey (yellow card) 10'; Bolton 54'; Norman 57' (o.g.); Vassell (yellow card) 74'; Leak 83'	Stadium: Rodney Parade; Attendance: 3,678; Referee: Sunny Gill

20 August 2022 5	Doncaster Rovers	2–1	Salford City	Doncaster
15:00 BST	Hurst 45+1', 63'	Report	Thomas-Asante 10'; Hendry (yellow card) 41'; Lund (yellow card) 44'; Watt (yellow card) 90+9'	Stadium: Eco-Power Stadium; Attendance: 6,057; Referee: Andrew Kitchen

27 August 2022 6	Salford City	1–0	Stevenage	Salford
15:00 BST	Watson 90'	Report	Piergianni (yellow card) 55'	Stadium: Moor Lane; Attendance: 2,023; Referee: Darren Drysdale

3 September 2022 7	Salford City	2–2	Crawley Town	Salford
15:00 BST	Hendry 3'; Watson 56'; Galbraith (yellow card) 90+3'	Report	Mason (yellow card) 19'; Nichols 29'; Hessenthaler (yellow card) 34'; Francillette 66'; Fellows (yellow card) 90+4'; Powell (yellow card) 90+8'; Bremang (yellow card) 90+8'	Stadium: Moor Lane; Attendance: 2,099; Referee: Seb Stockbridge

10 September 2022	Rochdale	Postponed	Salford City	Rochdale
15:00 BST				Stadium: Crown Oil Arena
Note: Fixture was postponed as a mark of respect following the passing of Queen Elizabeth II.

13 September 2022 8	Harrogate Town	0–1	Salford City	Harrogate
19:45 BST	Coley (yellow card) 24'	Report	Leak (yellow card) 19'; Watt (yellow card) 53'; Touray (yellow card) 63'; Lund 90+3'	Stadium: The EnviroVent Stadium; Attendance: 1,350; Referee: Ben Toner

17 September 2022 9	Salford City	0–1	Tranmere Rovers	Salford
15:00 BST	Hendry (yellow card) 45+1'; Watt (yellow card) 87'	Report	Hawkes 34'; Turnbull (yellow card) 45+1'; Hemmings (yellow card) 55'	Stadium: Moor Lane; Attendance: 3,175; Referee: David Rock

24 September 2022 10	Sutton United	1–2	Salford City	Sutton
15:00 BST	Neufville 62'; Wilson (red card) 68'	Report	Watt (yellow card) 44'; Chapman (yellow card) 52'; Vassell (yellow card) 68'; Lund 80'; Watson 87'; Hendry (yellow card) 90+5'; Beautyman (yellow card) 90+7'	Stadium: VBS Community Stadium; Attendance: 4,404; Referee: Robert Lewis

1 October 2022 11	Salford City	1–1	Grimsby Town	Salford
15:00 BST	Vassell 2'	Report	Richardson 29'; Clifton (yellow card) 62'	Stadium: Moor Lane; Attendance: 3,521; Referee: Marc Edwards

8 October 2022 12	Northampton Town	0–1	Salford City	Northampton
15:00 BST	Pinnock (yellow card) 53'; Fox (yellow card) 87'	Report	Galbraith 45+1'	Stadium: Sixfields Stadium; Attendance: 5,577; Referee: Lee Swabey

15 October 2022 13	Salford City	0–1	Bradford City	Salford
15:00 BST	Galbraith (yellow card) 18'	Report	Cook 13'; Angol (yellow card) 89'	Stadium: Moor Lane; Attendance: 3,924; Referee: Geoff Eltringham

22 October 2022 14	Salford City	0–2	Stockport County	Salford
15:00 BST	Eastham (yellow card) 40'; Galbraith (yellow card) 53'	Report	Collar 45+2'; Madden 78'	Stadium: Moor Lane; Attendance: 3,633; Referee: Scott Oldham

25 October 2022 15	Hartlepool United	0–2	Salford City	Hartlepool
19:45 BST		Report	Leak 26'; Watt (yellow card) 54'; Galbraith 90+3'	Stadium: Suit Direct Stadium; Attendance: 3,707; Referee: Darren Handley

29 October 2022 16	Leyton Orient	1–0	Salford City	Leyton
15:00 BST	Smyth 14' (yellow card) 90+1'	Report	Lund (yellow card) 26'; Touray (yellow card) 36'; Bailey (yellow card) 90+1'	Stadium: Breyer Group Stadium; Attendance: 7,676; Referee: Will Finnie

8 November 2022 17	Rochdale	1–0	Salford City	Spotland
19:45 GMT	Odoh (yellow card) 61'; Henderson 80'	Report	Galbraith (yellow card) 61'	Stadium: Spotland; Attendance: 2,355; Referee: Peter Wright

12 November 2022 18	Salford City	0–0	AFC Wimbledon	Salford
15:00 GMT	Vassell (yellow card) 40'; Bolton (yellow card) 78'; Watt (yellow card) 90+3'	Report	Kalambayi (yellow card) 40'	Stadium: Moor Lane; Attendance: 2,591; Referee: Ross Joyce

19 November 2022 19	Salford City	1–4	Carlisle United	Salford
15:00 GMT	Nartey (yellow card) 45+2'; Smith 52'; Leak (yellow card) 65'; Hendry (yellow card) 84'	Report	Dennis 3', 80'; Guy (yellow card) 42', (goal) 67'; Whelan 72'	Stadium: Moor Lane; Attendance: 3,454; Referee: Sunny Gill

3 December 2022 20	Gillingham	0–3	Salford City	Gillingham
15:00 GMT	Reeves (yellow card) 53'	Report	Vassell 54'; Watson 61'; Hendry 75'	Stadium: MEMS Priestfield Stadium; Attendance: 3,854; Referee: Paul Howard

10 December 2022	Salford City	Postponed	Walsall	Salford
15:00 GMT				Stadium: Moor Lane
Note: Fixture was postponed due to a frozen pitch.

17 December 2022	Colchester United	Postponed	Salford City	Colchester
15:00 GMT				Stadium: JobServe Community Stadion
Note: Fixture was postponed due to a frozen pitch.

26 December 2022 21	Salford City	1–1	Barrow	Salford
15:00 GMT	Smith 26'; Hendry (red card) 37'; Galbraith (yellow card) 58'; Vassell (yellow card) 90+3'	Report	Ray (yellow card) 54'; Neal (yellow card) 61'; Warren (yellow card) 64'; Stevens 79'	Stadium: Peninsula Stadium; Attendance: 2,881; Referee: Thomas Parsons

29 December 2022 22	Grimsby Town	1–4	Salford City	Cleethorpes
19:45 GMT	Khan 21'; Glennon (yellow card) 22'	Report	Smith 1', 34', 40'; Galbraith 30'	Stadium: Blundell Park; Attendance: 6,178; Referee: Carl Boyeson

1 January 2023 23	Bradford City	3–2	Salford City	Bradford
15:00 GMT	Vassell 8' (o.g.); Oliver 26'; Wright (yellow card) 41'; Chapman (yellow card) 55'; Platt (yellow card) 59'; Eisa 68'; Walker (yellow card) 90+4'	Report	McAleny 13', 60'; Nartey (yellow card) 87'; Watt (yellow card) 90+4'	Stadium: University of Bradford Stadium; Attendance: 17,521; Referee: Neil Hair

7 January 2023 24	Salford City	2–1	Northampton Town	Salford
12:30 GMT	Galbraith 9', (yellow card) 56'; McAleny 33'	Report	Hoskins 22'; Pinnock (yellow card) 60'	Stadium: Peninsula Stadium; Attendance: 2,753; Referee: Robert Lewis

14 January 2023 25	Salford City	2–0	Sutton United	Salford
15:00 GMT	McAleny 9', 45+1'; Smith (yellow card) 61'; Leak (yellow card) 65'; Touray (yellow card) 89'	Report	Milsom (penalty missed) 70'; Eastmond (yellow card) 76'; Bugiel (yellow card) 89'	Stadium: Peninsula Stadium; Attendance: 2,228; Referee: Lee Swabey

21 January 2023	Barrow	Postponed	Salford City	Barrow-in-Furness
15:00 GMT				Stadium: Holker Street
Note: Fixture was postponed on referee's Sam Barrott decision.

24 January 2023 26	Colchester United	1–1	Salford City	Colchester
19:45 GMT	Kelleher 63'	Report	McAleny 49'	Stadium: JobServe Community Stadium; Attendance: 2,748; Referee: Paul Howard

28 January 2023 27	Crawley Town	3–2	Salford City	Crawley
15:00 GMT	Telford 25'; Conroy 34'; Jenks (yellow card) 52', (goal) 59'; Ogungbo (yellow card) 81'; Gladwin (yellow card) 90'	Report	Watson 78'; Lund 90+3'; Galbraith (yellow card) 90+5'	Stadium: Broadfield Stadium; Attendance: 2,600; Referee: David Rock

31 January 2023 28	Salford City	1–0	Walsall	Salford
19:45 GMT	Smith 5'; Leak (yellow card) 46'; Galbraith (yellow card) 71'; Cairns (yellow card) 90+6'	Report	White (yellow card) 51'; Maddox (yellow card) 85'	Stadium: Peninsula Stadium; Attendance: 3,255; Referee: Darren Handley

4 February 2023 29	Salford City	2–1	Rochdale	Salford
15:00 GMT	Smith 10', (yellow card) 90+11'; McAleny 63'; Watson (yellow card) 81'	Report	Quigley 81' (pen.); Taylor (yellow card) 90+6'	Stadium: Peninsula Stadium; Attendance: 3,167; Referee: Bobby Madley

11 February 2023 30	Tranmere Rovers	1–0	Salford City	Birkenhead
15:00 GMT	Morris 22'; O'Connor (yellow card) 32'; Turnbull (yellow card) 40'	Report	Touray (yellow card) 37'; Watson (yellow card) 53'	Stadium: Prenton Park; Attendance: 6,516; Referee: James Oldham

14 February 2023 31	Salford City	1–1	Harrogate Town	Salford
19:45 GMT	Lund 81'	Report	Sutton (yellow card) 22'; Muldoon 50'; Burrell (yellow card) 69'	Stadium: Peninsula Stadium; Attendance: 1,615; Referee: Seb Stockbridge

18 February 2023 32	Salford City	1–2	Swindon Town	Salford
15:00 GMT	Watson 4', (yellow card) 59'; Watt (yellow card) 48'	Report	Wakeling 26'; Watt 55' (o.g.); Wakeling (yellow card) 70'; Hutton (yellow card) 88'	Stadium: Peninsula Stadium; Attendance: 3,008; Referee: Will Finnie

25 February 2023 33	Mansfield Town	2–5	Salford City	Mansfield
15:00 GMT	Perch (yellow card) 13'; Keillor-Dunn 36'; Clarke (yellow card) 52'; Bowery (yellow card) 78', (goal) 88'; Johnson (yellow card) 83'	Report	Lund 18', 56'; Hendry 21'; Lowe (yellow card) 28'; Bolton 50'; Vassell 81'	Stadium: One Call Stadium; Attendance: 6,868; Referee: Marc Edwards

28 February 2023 34	Barrow	1–1	Salford City	Barrow-in-Furness
19:45 GMT	Kay (yellow card) 20'; Vassell 70' (o.g.)	Report	Watson 12' (pen.); Bolton (yellow card) 59'; Touray (yellow card) 62'; Leak (yellow card) 83'	Stadium: So Legal Stadium; Attendance: 3,076; Referee: Scott Oldham

4 March 2023 35	Salford City	3–1	Newport County	Salford
15:00 GMT	Hendry 45+1'; McAleny 46'; Smith 90+5'	Report	Charsley 29'; Moriah-Welsh (yellow card) 45+3'	Stadium: The Peninsula Stadium; Attendance: 2,394; Referee: Charles Breakspear

11 March 2023 36	Crewe Alexandra	4–3	Salford City	Crewe
19:45 GMT	Agyei 31' (pen.), 90', (yellow card) 90'; Tabiner 40'; O'Riordan 87', (yellow card) 89'; Finnigan (yellow card) 90+7'	Report	Barry 19'; Hendry 45'; Mallan 85'	Stadium: Mornflake Stadium; Attendance: 4,311; Referee: Ben Speedie

18 March 2023 37	Salford City	3–1	Doncaster Rovers	Kersal
15:00 GMT	Bolton 12', 59'; Mallan 38'; Galbraith (yellow card) 73'; Leak (yellow card) 90+3'	Report	Rowe (yellow card) 4'; Miller 14'	Stadium: The Peninsula Stadium; Attendance: 3,148; Referee: Neil Hair

25 March 2023 38	Stevenage	1–3	Salford City	Stevenage
15:00 GMT	Norris (yellow card) 58', (goal) 90'; Roberts (yellow card) 82'	Report	Leak (yellow card) 42'; Mallan 65'; Cairns (yellow card) 80'; Hendry 80'; Smith 90+2'	Stadium: The Lamex Stadium; Attendance: 3,749; Referee: Darren Drysdale

31 March 2023 39	Stockport County	1–1	Salford City	Edgeley
19:45 BST	Lemonheigh-Evans 6'; Hussey (yellow card) 71'	Report	Hendry 51'; Mallan (yellow card) 67'	Stadium: Edgeley Park; Attendance: 10,305; Referee: Adam Herczeg

7 April 2023 40	Salford City	0–2	Leyton Orient	Kersal
15:00 BST	Mariappa (yellow card) 42'; Touray (yellow card) 54'; Lund (yellow card) 90+4'; Watt (yellow card) 90+6'	Report	Sotiriou 22', (yellow card) 74'; Moncur 35'; Smyth (yellow card) 62'; Sweeney (yellow card) 90+4'; El Mizouni (yellow card) 90+6'	Stadium: The Peninsula Stadium; Attendance: 3,412; Referee: Darren Handley

10 April 2023 41	AFC Wimbledon	2–3	Salford City	Wimbledon
15:00 BST	McAteer 7', (yellow card) 90+1'; Little (yellow card) 45+2'; Pearson (yellow card) 45+4'; Al-Hamadi 58'	Report	Galbraith (yellow card) 45+4'; McAleny 55'; Watt (yellow card) 79'; Hendry (penalty missed) 90+2', 90+5', 90+6', (yellow card) 90+7'	Stadium: Cherry Red Records Stadium; Attendance: 7,239; Referee: Bobby Madley

15 April 2023 42	Salford City	0–1	Colchester United	Kersal
15:00 BST	McAleny (yellow card) 45'; Vassell (yellow card) 62'; Hendry (yellow card) 90+4'	Report	Chilvers 22'; Tovide (yellow card) 56'; Ashley (yellow card) 63'; Hall (yellow card) 85'	Stadium: The Peninsula Stadium; Attendance: 2,333; Referee: Andy Haines

18 April 2023 43	Salford City	2–0	Hartlepool United	Kersal
19:45 BST	Smith 14'; Barry 28'	Report	Umerah (yellow card) 40'; Hamilton (yellow card) 90+2'	Stadium: The Peninsula Stadium; Attendance: 2,139; Referee: Ollie Yates

22 April 2023 44	Walsall	2–3	Salford City	Bescot
15:00 BST	McEntee (yellow card) 40'; Low (yellow card) 54'; Monthé (yellow card) 54'; Matt 62'; Wilkinson 90+5'	Report	Hendry 6'; Barry (red card) 53'; Mallan (yellow card) 82'; McAleny 88'; Lund 90+7'	Stadium: Poundland Bescot Stadium; Attendance: 5,208; Referee: Andrew Kitchen

29 April 2023 45	Carlisle United	2–3	Salford City	Carlisle
15:00 BST	Guy (yellow card) 16'; Edmondson (yellow card) 45+1'; Garner 77', (yellow card) 78'; Mellish (red card) 83'; Dennis 85' (pen.), (yellow card) 86'	Report	Hendry 23'; Bolton 28', 88'; Touray (yellow card) 52'; Watt (yellow card) 83'; McAleny (yellow card) 84'	Stadium: Brunton Park; Attendance: 10,927; Referee: Sebastian Stockbridge

8 May 2023 46	Salford City	0–1	Gillingham	Salford
15:00 BST	Mallan (yellow card) 86'; Watt (yellow card) 87'	Report	Ehmer (yellow card) 11'; Tutonda (yellow card) 61'; Alexander 84' (pen.)	Stadium: Moor Lane; Attendance: 3,519; Referee: Rebecca Welch

=== League Two play-offs ===
13 May 2023 Semi-final 1st leg	Salford City	1–0	Stockport County	Salford
19:45 BST	Smith 17'	Report		Stadium: Moor Lane; Attendance: 3,923; Referee: Tom Nield

20 May 2023 Semi-final 2nd leg	Stockport County	2–1 (a.e.t.) (3–1 p)	Salford City	Stockport
12:30 BST	Olaofe 68'; Stretton 115'	Report	Mallan 112'	Stadium: Edgeley Park; Attendance: 10,023; Referee: Ben Toner
	Penalties
	Madden (penalty scored); Croasdale (penalty missed); Collar (penalty scored); Sarcevic (penalty scored)		(penalty missed) Lund; (penalty missed) Mariappa; (penalty scored) Barry; (penalty missed) Mallan

=== FA Cup ===
The Ammies were drawn away to Peterborough United in the first round.

Win Draw Loss Fixtures

5 November 2022 First round	Peterborough United	0–0	Salford City	Peterborough
15:00 BST	Marriott (yellow card) 36'	Report	Galbraith (yellow card) 53'	Stadium: Weston Homes Stadium; Attendance: 4,031; Referee: Tom Nield

16 November 2022 First round replay	Salford City	0–3	Peterborough United	Salford
19:45 GMT	Watt (yellow card) 56'; Hendry (yellow card) 81'	Report	Mason-Clark 39'; Marriott 78', 83'	Stadium: Moor Lane; Attendance: 1,059; Referee: Ben Toner

=== EFL Cup ===
Win Draw Loss Fixtures

Salford were drawn away to Bolton Wanderers in the first round.

9 August 2022 First round	Bolton Wanderers	5–1	Salford City	Horwich
19:45 BST	Kachunga 31'; Böðvarsson 42'; Sadlier 61'; Bradley 77'; Afolayan 86'; Thomason (red card) 90+2'	Report	Thomas-Asante 23'; Vassell (yellow card) 70'; Watson (yellow card) 74'; Bolton (yellow card) 82'	Stadium: University of Bolton Stadium; Attendance: 6,505; Referee: John Brooks

=== EFL Trophy ===
Salford were drawn at home to Bradford City in the second round and to Port Vale in the third round.

Pos	Div	Team	Pld	W	PW	PL	L	GF	GA	GD	Pts	Qualification
1	L2	Salford City	3	1	2	0	0	4	3	+1	7	Advance to Round 2
2	L1	Accrington Stanley	3	1	1	1	0	6	5	+1	6	Advance to Round 2
3	L2	Rochdale	3	1	0	2	0	6	5	+1	5	
4	ACA	Liverpool U21	3	0	0	0	3	3	6	−3	0	

Source: EFL.com

Win Draw Loss Fixtures

30 August 2022 Group stage	Salford City	2–1	Liverpool U21s	Salford
19:30 BST	Berkoe 45'; Jenkins 59'; O'Brien (yellow card) 90+6'	Report	Quansah (yellow card) 18'; Stewart 88'	Stadium: Moor Lane; Attendance: 773; Referee: Andy Haines

20 September 2022 Group stage	Salford City	0–0 (4–2 p)	Accrington Stanley	Salford
19:30 BST	O'Brien (yellow card) 41'; Jenkins (yellow card) 80'; Chapman (yellow card) 90+5'	Report	Tharme (yellow card) 53'; Sloane (yellow card) 82'; Clark (yellow card) 90+4'	Stadium: Moor Lane; Attendance: 722; Referee: Thomas Kirk
	Penalties
	Smith (penalty scored); Hendry (penalty scored); Tolaj (penalty scored); Galbraith (penalty scored)		Savin (penalty missed); McConville (penalty scored); Coyle (penalty scored); Martin (penalty missed)

18 October 2022 Group stage	Rochdale	2–2 (2–4 p)	Salford City	Spotland
19:00 BST	Henderson 42'; Kelly 90+4'	Report	Simões 69' (yellow card) 84'; Hendry 71'; Watt (yellow card) 88'	Stadium: Spotland; Attendance: 1,203; Referee: Anthony Backhouse
	Penalties
	Henderson (penalty missed); Keohane (penalty missed); Brierley (penalty scored); Kelly (penalty scored)		Hendry (penalty scored); Watt (penalty scored); Watson (penalty scored); Bailey (penalty scored)

22 November 2022 Second round	Salford City	1–0	Bradford City	Salford
19:30 GMT	Tolaj 35'; Hendry (yellow card) 76'; Bailey (yellow card) 80'	Report		Stadium: Moor Lane; Attendance: 578; Referee: Tom Reeves

13 December 2022 Third round	Salford City	Postponed	Port Vale	Salford
19:00 GMT				Stadium: Moor Lane
Note: Fixture was postponed due to a frozen pitch.

20 December 2022 Third round	Salford City	1–0	Port Vale	Salford
19:30 GMT	Smith 10'; Galbraith (yellow card) 66'; Tolaj (yellow card) 80'; Bolton (yellow card) 90+6'	Report	Garrity (yellow card) 54'	Stadium: Moor Lane; Attendance: 743; Referee: Anthony Backhouse

10 January 2023 Quarter-final	Cheltenham Town	3–1	Salford City	Cheltenham
19:45 GMT	Southwood (yellow card) 36'; Broom 45'; Bradbury (yellow card) 45+3'; Taylor (yellow card) 55'; Sercombe 65'; Goodwin 66'	Report	Hendry 13'; Vassell (yellow card) 45+3'	Stadium: The Completely Suzuki Stadium; Attendance: 1,874; Referee: Carl Brook
