= 2021–22 Salford City F.C. season =

Salford City
2021–22 season
- Chairman: Karen Baird
- Manager: Gary Bowyer
- Stadium: Moor Lane
- League Two: 10th
- FA Cup: Second round
- EFL Cup: First round
- EFL Trophy: Group stage
- Top goalscorer: League: Brandon Thomas-Asante (11); All: Brandon Thomas-Asante (13)
- Highest home attendance: 3,765 (vs. Mansfield Town, 2 May)
- Lowest home attendance: 427 (vs. Leeds United U21, 2 November)
- Average home league attendance: 2,152
- Biggest win: 5–1 (vs. Scunthorpe United, 19 March)
- Biggest defeat: 0–3 (vs. Colchester United, 22 January)
Home colours	Away colours	Third colours

The 2021–22 season is Salford City's 82nd year in their history and third consecutive season in League Two. Along with the league, the club will also compete in the FA Cup, the EFL Cup and the EFL Trophy. The season covers the period from 1 July 2021 to 30 June 2022.

== Pre-season friendlies ==
Salford City announced they would play friendlies against Atherton Collieries, Derby County, Curzon Ashton and Lincoln City as part of their pre-season preparations.

10 July 2021 Friendly	Atherton Collieries	0–3	Salford City	Atherton
15:00 BST		Report	Henderson 4', 17'; Burgess 82'	Stadium: Skuna Stadium

24 July 2021 Friendly	Salford City	2–1	Derby County	Salford
15:00 BST	Morris 20' (pen.); Elliott 52'		Turnbull 76' (o.g.)	Stadium: Peninsula Stadium

27 July 2021 Friendly	Curzon Ashton	0–1	Salford City	Ashton-under-Lyne
19:45 BST			Hunter 78'	Stadium: Tameside Stadium

31 July 2021 Friendly	Salford City	0–2	Lincoln City	Salford
15:00 BST			Scully 4' (pen.); Hopper 67'	Stadium: Peninsula Stadium

== Competitions ==
=== League Two ===
==== League table ====
Pos	Team	Pld	W	D	L	GF	GA	GD	Pts	Promotion, qualification or relegation
7	Mansfield Town	46	22	11	13	67	52	+15	77	Qualification for League Two play-offs
8	Sutton United	46	22	10	14	69	53	+16	76	
9	Tranmere Rovers	46	21	12	13	53	40	+13	75	
10	Salford City	46	19	13	14	60	46	+14	70	
11	Newport County	46	19	12	15	67	58	+9	69	
12	Crawley Town	46	17	10	19	56	66	−10	61	
13	Leyton Orient	46	14	16	16	62	47	+15	58	

Source: EFL Official Website
Rules for classification: 1) Points; 2) Goal difference; 3) Number of goals scored; 4) Head-to-head results; 5) Wins; 6) Away goals; 7) Penalty points (sec 9.5); 8) 12-point sending off offences

==== Results summary ====
Overall								Home						Away					
Pld	W	D	L	GF	GA	GD	Pts	W	D	L	GF	GA	GD	W	D	L	GF	GA	GD
46	19	13	14	60	46	+14	70	10	9	4	33	21	+12	9	4	10	27	25	+2

Last updated: 7 May 2022.

==== Results by matchday ====
Matchday	1	2	3	4	5	6	7	8	9	10	11	12	13	14	15	16	17	18	19	20	21	22	23	24	25	26	27	28	29	30	31	32	33	34	35	36	37	38	39	40	41	42	43	44	45	46
Ground	H	H	A	H	H	A	H	A	H	A	A	H	H	A	H	A	A	H	H	A	H	A	H	A	A	H	A	A	H	A	A	A	H	A	A	H	H	H	A	H	H	A	H	A	H	A
Result	D	D	L	L	W	L	W	L	D	W	L	W	D	L	L	D	W	D	W	L	W	W	D	L	W	L	W	L	W	D	W	W	D	D	D	W	W	W	W	L	W	L	D	W	D	L
Position	11	14	16	21	16	20	14	17	19	15	17	15	13	17	19	17	16	16	11	17	13	12	11	13	10	10	9	10	10	10	10	11	11	11	11	11	11	11	9	10	8	11	9	8	10	10

Updated to match(es) played on 7 May 2022. Source: Statto.com
A = Away; H = Home; W = Win; D = Draw; L = Loss

==== Matches ====
Salford City's league fixtures were announced on 24 June 2021.

7 August 2021 1	Salford City	1–1	Leyton Orient	Salford
15:00 BST	Willock 41'; Turnbull (yellow card) 80'	Report	Beckles 33'; Pratley (yellow card) 88'	Stadium: Peninsula Stadium; Attendance: 1,968; Referee: Andrew Kitchen

14 August 2021 2	Salford City	0–0	Sutton United	Salford
15:00 BST	McAleny (yellow card) 42'; Lowe (yellow card) 61'; Elliott (yellow card) 90+3'	Report	Davis (yellow card) 62'	Stadium: Peninsula Stadium; Attendance: 1,460; Referee: Sam Barrott

17 August 2021 3	Crawley Town	2–1	Salford City	Crawley
19:45 BST	Nadesan 38'; Payne (yellow card) 50'; Hessenthaler 75'	Report	Henderson 7'	Stadium: The People's Pension Stadium; Attendance: 2,167; Referee: David Rock

21 August 2021 4	Salford City	0–1	Swindon Town	Salford
15:00 BST	Lund (yellow card) 90+5'	Report	Iandolo (yellow card) 27'; Payne 49'; Grant (yellow card) 52'; Reed (yellow card) 80'; Williams (yellow card) 89'	Stadium: Peninsula Stadium; Attendance: 2,229; Referee: Tom Reeves

28 August 2021 5	Salford City	3–0	Newport County	Salford
15:00 BST	Wright 1'; McAleny 18'; Henderson 30', (yellow card) 60'; Touray (yellow card) 32'; Morris (yellow card) 41'; N'Mai (yellow card) 90+1'	Report	Abraham (yellow card) 45+3'; Upson (yellow card) 72'; Norman (yellow card) 74'	Stadium: Peninsula Stadium; Referee: Ben Speedie

4 September 2021 6	Carlisle United	2–1	Salford City	Carlisle
15:00 BST	Dickenson 8'; Abrahams (yellow card) 29'; Clough (yellow card) 37'; Mellish 60'; Guy (yellow card) 84'	Report	Turnbull (yellow card) 39'; Morris 44'; Lowe (yellow card) 70'	Stadium: Brunton Park; Attendance: 4,671; Referee: Martin Coy

11 September 2021 7	Salford City	1–0	Bradford City	Salford
15:00 BST	Shephard (yellow card) 68'; Lund 90'	Report	Ridehalgh (yellow card) 13'; Watt 27'; O'Connor (yellow card) 69'	Stadium: Moor Lane; Referee: Jeremy Simpson

18 September 2021 8	Tranmere Rovers	2–0	Salford City	Birkenhead
15:00 BST	Morris 13' (pen.); Hawkes (yellow card) 41'; Spearing (red card) 45+1'; Clarke (yellow card) 45+5'; Nevitt 48'	Report	Touray (red card) 20'; Lowe (yellow card) 50'; Hunter (yellow card) 75'	Stadium: Prenton Park; Attendance: 5,854; Referee: Sam Purkiss

25 September 2021 9	Salford City	2–2	Northampton Town	Salford
15:00 BST	Hunter (yellow card) 8'; Lund 24'; Lowe (yellow card) 90'; Eastham 90+3'	Report	Lewis 16'; Rose (yellow card) 45+2'; Pinnock 77'	Stadium: Peninsula Stadium; Attendance: 2,037; Referee: Anthony Backhouse

2 October 2021 10	Colchester United	0–2	Salford City	Colchester
15:00 BST	Jasper (yellow card) 90+2'	Report	Thomas-Asante 10', (yellow card) 59' (yellow-red card) 88'; Elliott 25'; Turnbull (yellow card) 38'; Lund (yellow card) 50'	Stadium: JobServe Community Stadium; Attendance: 2,566; Referee: Craig Hicks

9 October 2021 11	Walsall	2–1	Salford City	Bescot
15:00 BST	Phillips 1'; Labadie (yellow card) 31'; Wilkinson 90+5'; Menayese (yellow card) 90+6'	Report	Lund (yellow card) 73'; Eastham 78'; Hunter (yellow card) 79'	Stadium: Banks's Stadium; Attendance: 5,005; Referee: Trevor Kettle

16 October 2021 12	Salford City	2–0	Hartlepool United	Salford
15:00 BST	Elliott 3', (yellow card) 44'; Turnbull (yellow card) 72'; Willock 86'; Thomas-Asante (yellow card) 90+5'	Report	Featherstone (yellow card) 47'; Sterry (yellow card) 81'	Stadium: Peninsula Stadium; Attendance: 2,448; Referee: Peter Wright

19 October 2021 13	Salford City	0–0	Rochdale	Salford
19:45 GMT	Willock (yellow card) 32'; Lowe (yellow card) 50'; Touray (yellow card) 70'	Report	Broadbent (yellow card) 17'; O'Keeffe (yellow card) 68'	Stadium: Peninsula Stadium; Attendance: 2,173; Referee: Seb Stockbridge

24 October 2021 14	Forest Green Rovers	3–1	Salford City	Nailsworth
15:00 BST	Moore-Taylor (yellow card) 8'; Cadden 45+1'; Wilson 71'; Aitchison 90+3'	Report	Touray (yellow card) 15'; Thomas-Asante 17'; Elliott (yellow card) 35'; Lund (yellow card) 43'	Stadium: The Fully Charged New Lawn; Attendance: 2,245; Referee: Andy Woolmer

30 October 2021 15	Salford City	1–2	Exeter City	Salford
15:00 BST	Elliott 79'	Report	Key (yellow card) 29'; Dieng (yellow card) 43'; Jay 53'; Ripley 90+3' (o.g.)	Stadium: Peninsula Stadium; Attendance: 1,892; Referee: John Busby

13 November 2021 16	Scunthorpe United	1–1	Salford City	Scunthorpe
15:00 GMT	Loft (yellow card) 32', (goal) 37'; Kenyon (yellow card) 45+2'; Perry (yellow card) 47'	Report	Lowe (yellow card) 45+2'; N'Mai (yellow card) 56'; McAleny 59'; Thomas-Asante (yellow card) 62'	Stadium: Sands Venue Stadium; Attendance: 2,614; Referee: Josh Smith

20 November 2021 17	Harrogate Town	0–2	Salford City	Harrogate
15:00 GMT	Page (yellow card) 39'	Report	Lund 37', (yellow card) 83'; Lowe 74'; Love (yellow card) 81'	Stadium: EnviroVent Stadium; Attendance: 2,814; Referee: Charles Breakspear

23 November 2021 18	Salford City	1–1	Bristol Rovers	Salford
19:45 GMT	Thomas-Asante (yellow card) 39', (goal) 90+5'; Willock (red card) 41'; Love (yellow card) 48'; Elliott (yellow card) 80'; Hunter (red card) 89'	Report	Nicholson 14'; Anderton (yellow card) 33'	Stadium: Peninsula Stadium; Attendance: 1,740; Referee: Ben Toner

27 November 2021 19	Salford City	2–0	Oldham Athletic	Salford
15:00 GMT	Eastham (yellow card) 2'; Lund 45+1'; Thomas-Asante 77', (yellow card) 90+2'; Turnbull (yellow card) 80'	Report	Hart (yellow card) 45'; Hope (yellow card) 79'; Stobbs (yellow card) 87'	Stadium: Peninsula Stadium; Attendance: 3,242; Referee: Paul Howard

11 December 2021 20	Mansfield Town	2–1	Salford City	Mansfield
15:00 GMT	Hawkins (yellow card) 20'; Oates 36'; McLaughlin 45'; Lapslie (yellow card) 69'	Report	Lund 9'; Lowe (yellow card) 18'	Stadium: One Call Stadium; Attendance: 4,113; Referee: Anthony Backhouse

18 December 2021 21	Salford City	1–0	Stevenage	Salford
15:00 GMT	Hunter (yellow card) 7'; Turnbull 34'	Report	Prosser (yellow card) 69'; Osborne (yellow card) 90+4'	Stadium: Peninsula Stadium; Attendance: 1,375; Referee: Tom Reeves

8 January 2022 22	Newport County	0–2	Salford City	Neport
15:00 GMT	Norman (yellow card) 72'	Report	Azaz 44' (o.g.); Thomas-Asante 52'; Lund (yellow card) 72'	Stadium: Rodney Parade; Attendance: 0 (Behind-closed-doors); Referee: Brett Huxtable

11 January 2022 23	Salford City	1–1	Tranmere Rovers	Salford
19:45 GMT	Oteh 29'; Wright (yellow card) 66'; Vassell (yellow card) 69'; Eastham (yellow card) 71'; Morris (yellow card) 77'	Report	Glatzel 70'; Davies (yellow card) 90+2'	Stadium: Peninsula Stadium; Attendance: 2,273; Referee: Ross Joyce

15 January 2022 24	Bradford City	2–1	Salford City	Bradford
15:00 GMT	Watson 57' (o.g.); O'Connor 85'	Report	Eastham (yellow card) 31'; Thomas-Asante 35', (red card) 43'; Vassell (yellow card) 45+5'; Love (yellow card) 65'	Stadium: Utilita Energy Stadium; Referee: James Oldham

18 January 2022 25	Port Vale	0–1	Salford City	Burslem
19:45 GMT	Walker (yellow card) 90+3'; Gibbons (yellow card) 90+3'	Report	Ndaba (yellow card) 28'; Elliott 50'; Kelly (yellow card) 86'	Stadium: Vale Park; Attendance: 4,311; Referee: James Bell

22 January 2022 26	Salford City	0–3	Colchester United	Salford
15:00 GMT	Turnbull (yellow card) 50'; Watson (yellow card) 54'	Report	Chambers 30'; Kenlock 33'; Huws (yellow card) 61'; Andrews 82'	Stadium: Peninsula Stadium; Referee: Ollie Yates

25 January 2022 27	Barrow	0–2	Salford City	Barrow-in-Furness
19:45 GMT	Platt (yellow card) 59'; Brough (yellow card) 72'	Report	Love (yellow card) 38'; Turnbull (yellow card) 52'; Hunter 60'; Shephard (yellow card) 72'; Hutton 90+2' (o.g.)	Stadium: The Dune Hotel Stadium; Attendance: 3,510; Referee: Andy Haines

29 January 2022 28	Northampton Town	1–0	Salford City	Sixfields
15:00 GMT	Lewis 12'	Report	Lowe (yellow card) 35'; Ndaba (yellow card) 66'	Stadium: PTS Academy Stadium; Attendance: 5,237; Referee: Tom Nield

1 February 2022 29	Salford City	2–1	Carlisle United	Salford
19:45 GMT	Watson 52' (pen.); Smith 71'	Report	Feeney (yellow card) 62'; Patrick 67'; Riley (yellow card) 82'	Stadium: Peninsula Stadium; Attendance: 2,059; Referee: Simon Mather

8 February 2022 30	Sutton United	0–0	Salford City	Sutton
19:45 GMT	John (yellow card) 52'; Milsom (yellow card) 84'	Report	Ndaba (yellow card) 86'	Stadium: Borough Sports Ground; Attendance: 2,491; Referee: Lee Swabey

12 February 2022 31	Leyton Orient	0–2	Salford City	Leyton
15:00 GMT		Report	Shephard 50'; Vassell 60'	Stadium: Breyer Group Stadium; Attendance: 4,427; Referee: Ben Speedie

26 February 2022 32	Swindon Town	1–2	Salford City	Swindon
15:00 GMT	McKirdy 55'	Report	Shephard 65'; Kelly (yellow card) 71'; Watson 86'	Stadium: The County Ground; Attendance: 10,153; Referee: John Busby

5 March 2022 33	Salford City	1–1	Forest Green Rovers	Salford
15:00 GMT	Smith 7'; Vassell (yellow card) 48'; Turnbull (yellow card) 63'	Report	Stevens 53'; Matt (yellow card) 63'; Adams (yellow card) 71'	Stadium: Peninsula Stadium; Attendance: 1,987; Referee: Declan Bourne

12 March 2022 34	Exeter City	0–0	Salford City	Exeter
15:00 GMT		Report	Turnbull (yellow card) 35'	Stadium: St James Park; Attendance: 5,775; Referee: Andy Woolmer

15 March 2022 35	Rochdale	1–1	Salford City	Spotland
19:45 GMT	Ball 27'; Kelly (yellow card) 72'	Report	Lund 66'	Stadium: Crown Oil Arena; Attendance: 2,041; Referee: Chris Sarginson

19 March 2022 36	Salford City	5–1	Scunthorpe United	Salford
15:00 GMT	Smith 17'; Thomas-Asante 45+1', 67', (yellow card) 68', (goal) 81'; Kelly 77'	Report	Nuttall 61'; Feeney (yellow card) 80'	Stadium: Peninsula Stadium; Attendance: 1,972; Referee: Peter Wright

26 March 2022 37	Salford City	2–1	Walsall	Salford
15:00 GMT	Turnbull (yellow card) 33'; Smith 45'; Watson 66' (pen.)	Report	Menayese 34'; Rodney (yellow card) 55'; Kinsella (yellow card) 72'; Monthé (yellow card) 83'	Stadium: The Peninsula Stadium; Attendance: 2,584; Referee: Anthony Backhouse

29 March 2022 38	Salford City	2–1	Crawley Town	Salford
19:45 BST	Thomas-Asante 18', (yellow card) 43'; Hunter (yellow card) 37'; Turnbull 77'	Report	Ferry (yellow card) 58'; Tilley (yellow card) 60'; Nichols 82'	Stadium: The Peninsula Stadium; Attendance: 1,290; Referee: Marc Edwards

2 April 2022 39	Hartlepool United	0–2	Salford City	Hartlepool
15:00 BST		Report	Ndaba 19'; Lowe 28'; Hunter (yellow card) 44'; Love (yellow card) 90+1'	Stadium: The Suit Direct Stadium; Attendance: 4,949; Referee: Darren Drysdale

5 April 2022 40	Salford City	0–1	Port Vale	Salford
19:45 BST	Hunter (yellow card) 20'; Smith (yellow card) 24'; Love (yellow card) 68'; Lund (yellow card) 69'	Report	Proctor (yellow card) 12'; Walker (yellow card) 17'; Charsley 59'; Benning (yellow card) 87'	Stadium: Peninsula Stadium; Referee: Darren Handley

9 April 2022 41	Salford City	2–0	Harrogate Town	Salford
15:00 BST	Lowe (yellow card) 58'; Smith 70', 75'	Report	Burrell (yellow card) 18'	Stadium: Peninsula Stadium; Referee: Andrew Kitchen

15 April 2022 42	Bristol Rovers	1–0	Salford City	Horfield
15:00 BST	Finley (yellow card) 45+3'; Evans (yellow card) 62'; E. Anderson 75'; H. Anderson (yellow card) 90+3'	Report	Touray (yellow card) 24'; Kelly (yellow card) 44'; Ndaba (yellow card) 59'	Stadium: Memorial Stadium; Attendance: 9,590; Referee: Dean Whitestone

18 April 2022 43	Salford City	2–2	Barrow	Salford
15:00 BST	Watson 23'; Lund (yellow card) 75'; Henderson 89'	Report	Beadling (yellow card) 30'; Brown (yellow card) 45+2'; Gordon 66'; Amadi-Holloway 83'	Stadium: The Peninsula Stadium; Attendance: 2,575; Referee: Andy Haines

23 April 2022 44	Oldham Athletic	1–2	Salford City	Oldham
15:00 BST	Keillor-Dunn 33' (pen.)	Report	Smith 8'; Turnbull (yellow card) 32'; Thomas-Asante 45+3', (yellow card) 78'	Stadium: Boundary Park; Attendance: 5,752; Referee: Bobby Madley

2 May 2022 45	Salford City	2–2	Mansfield Town	Salford
12:30 BST	Turnbull 2', (yellow card) 13'; Lund 52'; Love (yellow card) 63'; Kelly (yellow card) 87'; Lowe (yellow card) 90+1'	Report	O'Toole (yellow card) 4'; McLaughlin 15', 45+3' (pen.)	Stadium: Peninsula Stadium; Attendance: 3,765; Referee: Seb Stockbridge

7 May 2022 46	Stevenage	4–2	Salford City	Stevenage
15:00 BST	Vassell 23' (o.g.); Reid 43'; Bostwick 49', (yellow card) 90+2'; List 80'	Report	Shephard 14'; Ndaba 67'	Stadium: The Lamex Stadium; Attendance: 3,558; Referee: Martin Coy

=== FA Cup ===
Salford City were drawn away to Dagenham & Redbridge in the first round and at home to Chesterfield in the second round.

8 November 2021 First round	Dagenham & Redbridge	0–1	Salford City	Dagenham
19:45 GMT	Clark (yellow card) 90+7'	Report	Turnbull 3', (yellow card) 66'; Touray (yellow card) 72'	Stadium: Victoria Road; Attendance: 2,330; Referee: David Rock

5 December 2021 Second round	Salford City	0–2	Chesterfield	Salford
17:15 GMT	Lund (yellow card) 8'	Report	Mandeville 28'; Kellerman 86'	Stadium: Peninsula Stadium; Attendance: 1,997; Referee: Ross Joyce

=== EFL Cup ===
10 August 2021 First round	Derby County	3–3 (5–3 p)	Salford City	Derby
19:45 BST	Ebosele (yellow card) 42'; Hutchinson 43'; Kazim-Richards 71' (pen.); Jóźwiak (yellow card) 77'; Morrison 82'	Report	Turnbull 8', (yellow card) 18'; Morris 14', 74' (pen.)	Stadium: Pride Park Stadium; Referee: James Bell
	Penalties
	Shinnie (penalty scored); Kazim-Richards (penalty scored); Brown (penalty scored); Forsyth (penalty scored); Watson (penalty scored)		Morris (penalty scored); Burgess (penalty missed); Touray (penalty scored); Lund (penalty scored)
Note: Live on Sky Sports

=== EFL Trophy ===
Pos	Div	Team	Pld	W	PW	PL	L	GF	GA	GD	Pts	Qualification
1	L2	Tranmere Rovers	3	3	0	0	0	9	3	+6	9	Advance to Round 2
2	L2	Oldham Athletic	3	1	0	0	2	5	6	−1	3	Advance to Round 2
3	L2	Salford City	3	1	0	0	2	5	6	−1	3	
4	ACA	Leeds United U21	3	1	0	0	2	7	11	−4	3	

Source: EFL.com

31 August 2021 Group game 1	Oldham Athletic	1–0	Salford City	Oldham
19:00 BST	Piergianni 43'	Report	Denny (yellow card) 52'; Sargent (yellow card) 60'	Stadium: Boundary Park; Attendance: 1,915; Referee: James Oldham

5 October 2021 Group game 2	Salford City	0–2	Tranmere Rovers	Salford
19:00 BST	Love (yellow card) 56'	Report	Watson 16'; Dieseruvwe (yellow card) 68'; Macdonald (yellow card) 70'; Knight-Percival (yellow card) 76'; Merrie (yellow card) 82'; Walker 86'	Stadium: Peninsula Stadium; Attendance: 720; Referee: Ollie Yates

2 November 2021 Group game 3	Salford City	5–3	Leeds United U21	Salford
19:00 GMT	Shephard (yellow card) 11'; Thomas-Asante 26', 59'; Touray 32'; Oteh 39'; Turnbull 70', (yellow card) 76'	Report	Dean 9'; Greenwood (yellow card) 23', (goal) 35'; Mullen (yellow card) 61'; Bate 68'	Stadium: Peninsula Stadium; Attendance: 427; Referee: Rebecca Welch

== Transfers ==
=== Transfers in ===
Date	Position	Nationality	Name	From	Fee	Ref.
1 July 2021	CM	(Wales)	Marcus Dackers	(England) Brighton & Hove Albion	Free transfer	
1 July 2021	CM	(Northern Ireland)	Matty Lund	(England) Rochdale	Free transfer	
1 July 2021	CF	(England)	Conor McAleny	(England) Oldham Athletic	Free transfer	
1 July 2021	RB	(England)	James Melhado	(England) Newcastle Town	Free transfer	
1 July 2021	LM	(England)	Josh Morris	(England) Fleetwood Town	Free transfer	
1 July 2021	RB	(Wales)	Liam Shephard	(Wales) Newport County	Free transfer	
7 July 2021	GK	(Wales)	Tom King	(Wales) Newport County	Free transfer	
24 July 2021	GK	(England)	Joel Torrance	(England) Altrincham	Free transfer	
4 August 2021	CM	(Montserrat)	Matty Willock	(England) Gillingham	Free transfer	
31 August 2021	RB	(Scotland)	Donald Love	(England) Shrewsbury Town	Free transfer	
25 September 2021	CF	(England)	Aramide Oteh	(England) Queens Park Rangers	Free transfer	
12 November 2021	CB	(England)	Theo Vassell	(Wales) Wrexham	Free transfer	
14 January 2022	DM	(England)	Ryan Watson	(England) Tranmere Rovers	Undisclosed	
19 January 2022	CF	(England)	Matt Smith	(England) Millwall	Free transfer	
31 January 2022	RM	(England)	Luke Bolton	(England) Manchester City	Undisclosed	

=== Loans in ===
Date from	Position	Nationality	Name	From	Date until	Ref.
30 July 2021	GK	(England)	Zach Jeacock	(England) Birmingham City	End of season	
17 August 2021	RW	(Republic of Ireland)	Tyreik Wright	(England) Aston Villa	End of season	
21 August 2021	CB	(Republic of Ireland)	Corrie Ndaba	(England) Ipswich Town	End of season	
28 August 2021	CF	(England)	D'Mani Mellor	(England) Manchester United	End of season	
30 August 2021	CB	(England)	Andy Smith	(England) Hull City	14 January 2022	
12 January 2022	CM	(Scotland)	Stephen Kelly	(Scotland) Rangers	End of season	
25 March 2022	GK	(England)	Frank Fielding	(England) Stoke City	1 April 2022	

=== Loans out ===
Date from	Position	Nationality	Name	To	Date until	Ref.
14 January 2022	LB	(England)	Kevin Berkoe	(England) Altrincham	February 2022	
14 January 2022	CF	(Wales)	Marcus Dackers	(England) Chester	February 2022	
20 January 2022	RB	(England)	James Melhado	(England) Ashton United		
20 January 2022	CM	(Wales)	Matt Sargent	(England) Ashton United		
22 January 2022	CF	(Wales)	Momodou Touray	(England) Hereford	End of season	
27 January 2022	CF	(England)	Tom Elliott	(England) Bradford City	End of season	

=== Transfers out ===
Date	Position	Nationality	Name	To	Fee	Ref.
28 June 2022	GK	(Czech Republic)	Václav Hladký	(England) Ipswich Town	Undisclosed	
30 June 2021	LW	(Portugal)	Bruno Andrade	(England) Stevenage	Mutual consent	
30 June 2021	CF	(England)	Luke Armstrong	(England) Harrogate Town	Undisclosed	
30 June 2021	LW	(Scotland)	George Boyd	Retired	—N/a	
30 June 2021	RB	(England)	Tom Clarke	(England) Fleetwood Town	Released	
30 June 2021	CF	(England)	Emmanuel Dieseruvwe	(England) Tranmere Rovers	Released	
30 June 2021	CB	(England)	Harry Ditchfield	(England) Hyde United	Released	
30 June 2021	CM	(England)	Alex Doyle	(England) Marine	Released	
30 June 2021	CB	(England)	Sam Fielding	(England) York City	Released	
30 June 2021	CM	(Republic of Ireland)	Darron Gibson		Released	
30 June 2021	FW	(England)	Ryan Ghaly		Released	
30 June 2021	CF	(Wales)	Dan Hawkins	(Republic of Ireland) Shelbourne	Released	
30 June 2021	LB	(England)	Dan Jones	(England) Port Vale	Released	
30 June 2021	MF	(England)	Daniel Jones		Released	
30 June 2021	DF	(England)	Phil Perry		Released	
30 June 2021	MF	(England)	Tom Shepherd		Released	
30 June 2021	MF	(England)	Will Shepherd	(England) Mossley	Released	
30 June 2021	RB	(England)	Oscar Threlkeld	(England) Bradford City	Released	
30 June 2021	MF	(England)	Jaden Timmis		Released	
30 June 2021	CM	(Republic of Ireland)	Richie Towell	(Republic of Ireland) Shamrock Rovers	Released	
30 June 2021	GK	(Wales)	Max Williams		Released	
30 June 2021	CF	(England)	James Wilson	(England) Port Vale	Released	
11 January 2022	DM	(England)	Alex Denny	(Wales) The New Saints	Undisclosed	
24 January 2022	CF	(England)	Aramide Oteh		End of contract	
