= Jack Jenkins (English footballer) =

English footballer

Personal information
- Full name: Jack Jenkins
- Date of birth: 26 November 2001 (age 24)
- Place of birth: Leeds, England
- Height: 1.90 m (6 ft 3 in)
- Position: Midfielder

Team information
- Current team: Bedford Town (on loan from FC Halifax Town)

Youth career
- Garforth Villa
- –2020: Leeds United

Senior career*
Years	Team	Apps	(Gls)
2020–2024	Leeds United	0	(0)
2022–2023	→ Salford City (loan)	4	(0)
2023–2024	→ Scunthorpe United (loan)	9	(0)
2024–	FC Halifax Town	60	(0)
2026–	→ Bedford Town (loan)	1	(0)
- * Club domestic league appearances and goals as of 18:51, 31 March 2026 (UTC)

Jack Jenkins (born 26 November 2001) is an English professional footballer who plays as a midfielder for Bedford Town on loan from National League club FC Halifax Town.

== Career ==
After playing for Garforth Villa at youth level, and coming through Leeds United's academy, Jenkins signed a two-year scholarship with the club in April 2018. Jenkins signed his first professional contract on 15 January 2019, with the contract lasting until the summer of 2021. He signed a new contract in November 2019, lasting until summer 2023. He played for Leeds United U21s against Barrow in the EFL Trophy on 5 October 2020. He was first named on the Leeds bench on 7 November 2020 for a fixture against Crystal Palace. Jenkins made his senior Leeds debut on 10 January 2021 in the 3–0 FA Cup third round defeat against Crawley Town as a half-time substitute. On 8 September 2023, Jenkins joined Scunthorpe United on loan until January 2024.

On 31 January 2024, Jenkins joined National League club FC Halifax Town on a permanent deal.

In March 2026, Jenkins joined National League North club Bedford Town on a one-month loan.

On 5 May 2026, Halifax announced they would be releasing the player.

== Style of play ==
Jenkins is right-footed. He typically plays as a box-to-box midfielder. He can also play as a defensive midfielder.

== Career statistics ==
As of 31 January 2024

Appearances and goals by club, season and competition
Club	Season	League			FA Cup		EFL Cup		Other		Total	
Club	Season	Division	Apps	Goals	Apps	Goals	Apps	Goals	Apps	Goals	Apps	Goals
Leeds United	2020–21	Premier League	0	0	1	0	0	0	0	0	1	0
Leeds United	2021–22	Premier League	0	0	0	0	0	0	0	0	0	0
Leeds United	2022–23	Premier League	0	0	0	0	0	0	0	0	0	0
Leeds United	2023–24	Championship	0	0	0	0	0	0	0	0	0	0
Leeds United	Total		0	0	1	0	0	0	0	0	1	0
Leeds United U21	2020–21	—			—		—		2 (Note: Appearance(s) in EFL Trophy)	0	2	0
Leeds United U21	2021–22	—			—		—		1	0	1	0
Leeds United U21	Total				—		—		3	0	3	0
Salford City (loan)	2022–23	League Two	4	0	2	0	0	0	5	1	11	1
Scunthorpe United (loan)	2023–24	National League North	9	0	2	0	—		0	0	11	0
Career total			13	0	5	0	0	0	8	1	26	1
