= Ryan Leak =

English footballer (born 1998)

Personal information
- Full name: Ryan David Leak
- Date of birth: 28 February 1998 (age 28)
- Place of birth: Burton upon Trent, England
- Height: 6 ft 3 in (1.91 m)
- Position: Centre-back

Team information
- Current team: Walsall
- Number: 26

Youth career
- 2005–2016: Wolverhampton Wanderers

Senior career*
Years	Team	Apps	(Gls)
2016–2019	Wolverhampton Wanderers	0	(0)
2017–2018	→ The New Saints (loan)	12	(1)
2018	→ AFC Telford United (loan)	2	(0)
2018–2019	→ Jumilla (loan)	30	(0)
2019–2021	Burgos	25	(0)
2021–2022	Burton Albion	16	(0)
2022–2023	Salford City	38	(2)
2023–2025	Ross County	49	(0)
2026–	Walsall	6	(0)

International career
2014–2015	Wales U17	2	(0)
- * Club domestic league appearances and goals as of 21 December 2025

Ryan David Leak (born 28 February 1998) is a professional footballer who plays as a centre-back for EFL League Two club Walsall. He is a former Wales under-17's international.

== Career ==
Born in Burton Upon Trent, Leak joined Wolverhampton Wanderers academy at the age of 7 staying at the club for 14 years, progressing through the ranks, before making his debut for the U23 side in 2016 in a 3–2 victory over Crewe Alexandra in the EFL Trophy.

He went on to enjoy three loan spells, the first being a short loan to The New Saints in the Cymru Premier, where he made 12 appearances, scoring a solitary goal in a 5–2 victory against Carmarthen Town. After a short unsuccessful loan at AFC Telford United, a third loan spell took him abroad to Spain, where he joined FC Jumilla on a season long loan for the 2018–19 Segunda División B, making 30 appearances.

Leak left Wolves at the end of the 2018–19 season, after 14 years, and joined fellow Segunda División B side Burgos CF, where he played 25 games over the following two seasons.

After leaving Burgos, Leak joined Burton Albion on trial, before signing a two-year deal with the club in July 2021.

On 18 July 2022, Leak joined League Two club Salford City for an undisclosed fee, signing a two-year deal. A year later, he signed for Scottish club Ross County. Leak left county on 1 June 2025 after making 58 appearances for the club.

On 21 July 2026, Leak joined League Two club Walsall on a one year deal with the option of a further year.

== Personal life ==
Ryan is the brother of Kidderminster Harriers defender Tom Leak.

== Career statistics ==
As of match played 4 November 2026

Appearances and goals by club, season and competition
Club	Season	League			Domestic Cup		League Cup		Other		Total	
Club	Season	Division	Apps	Goals	Apps	Goals	Apps	Goals	Apps	Goals	Apps	Goals
Wolverhampton Wanderers U23s	2016–17		~	~	~	~	~	~	1 (Note: Appearances in EFL Trophy)	0	1	0
Wolverhampton Wanderers	2017–18	EFL Championship	0	0	0	0	0	0	—		0	0
Wolverhampton Wanderers	2018–19	Premier League	0	0	0	0	0	0	—		0	0
Wolverhampton Wanderers	Total		0	0	0	0	0	0	0	0	0	0
The New Saints (loan)	2017–18	Welsh Premier League	12	1	0	0	0	0	2 (Note: Appearances in Scottish Challenge Cup)	0	14	1
AFC Telford United (loan)	2017–18	National League North	2	0	0	0	0	0	—		2	0
Jumilla (loan)	2018–19	Segunda División B	30	0	0	0	—		—		30	0
Burgos	2019–20	Segunda División B					—		—			
Burgos	2020–21	Segunda División B			1	0	—		—		1	0
Burgos	Total				1	0					1	0
Burton Albion	2021–22	EFL League One	16	0	2	1	1	0	3	0	22	1
Salford City	2022–23	EFL League Two	38	2	2	0	1	0	6	0	47	2
Ross County	2023–24	Scottish Premiership	33	0	1	0	2	0	2 (Note: Appearances in Scottish Premiership play-offs)	0	38	0
Ross County	2024–25	Scottish Premiership	16	0	0	0	4	0	—		20	0
Ross County	Total		49	0	1	0	6	0	2	0	58	0
Walsall	2026–27	EFL League Two	6	0	0	0	1	0	1	0	8	0
Career Total			153	3	6	1	9	0	15	0	183	4

== Honours ==
The New Saints

- Welsh Premier League: 2017–18

Burgos CF

- Promotion to La Liga 2: 2020–21
