= Matt Sargent =

Welsh footballer

Personal information
- Full name: Matthew Rhys Sargent
- Date of birth: 24 July 2001 (age 25)
- Place of birth: Bodelwyddan, Wales
- Position: Midfielder

Team information
- Current team: Radcliffe

Youth career
- 2012–2018: Wrexham

Senior career*
Years	Team	Apps	(Gls)
2018–2020	Wrexham	1	(0)
2019–2020	→ Airbus (loan)	17	(1)
2020–2023	Salford City	0	(0)
2020	→ Widnes (loan)	3	(1)
2021	→ Matlock Town (loan)	8	(0)
2022	→ Ashton United (loan)	7	(0)
2022	→ Chester (loan)	11	(1)
2022	→ Buxton (loan)	14	(0)
2023	→ Warrington Rylands	10	(3)
2023–2026	Radcliffe	105	(9)

International career
2017	Wales U16	1	(0)
2017	Wales U17	5	(0)
- * Club domestic league appearances and goals as of 18:30, 11 September 2024 (UTC)

Matthew Rhys Sargent (born 24 July 2001) is a Welsh footballer who plays as a midfielder for National League North club Radcliffe.

A product of the Wrexham academy, he made his first team debut in 2018, and the following season spent time on loan at Cymru Premier team Airbus. Following his release by Wrexham in 2020, he joined Salford City. During his time at Salford, he has been loaned out to non-league clubs Widnes, Matlock Town, Ashton United and Chester. Internationally, Sargent has represented Wales at youth level, making a total of three appearances in 2017 for the U16 and U17 sides.

== Career ==
=== Club career ===
Born in Bodelwyddan, Wales, Sargent is a product of the Wrexham academy, having joined aged 11 from Accrington Stanley. His first appearance at youth level came in October 2016 in the Football League Youth Alliance, and he scored his first goal in January 2018. Sargent made his Wrexham senior debut on 15 December of the same year, coming on as a late substitute in the 3–0 first round win in the FA Trophy against Boston United. His league debut came on the final day of the 2018–19 National League regular season, starting in a 2–1 win against Harrogate Town at the age of 17. Wrexham manager Bryan Hughes praised Sargent for his performance, describing it as "magnificent" and that he "didn't look out of place".

On 9 May, he signed his first professional contract, a one-year deal following the completion of his scholarship, and said Hughes' faith gave him confidence to progress. During pre-season of the 2019–20 season, Sargent was told by Hughes he had every chance of making it as a Wrexham first-team player, but in August was loaned out to Cymru Premier team Airbus until January. On 18 September, he received a red card for a bad tackle during a defeat to Barry Town United, and subsequently missed three games. Sargent returned to Wrexham when his loan deal ended in January 2020, and was released at the end of his contract in June.

He signed for EFL League Two team Salford City in October of their 2020–21 season, and moved on loan to Widnes of the Northern Premier League Division One West in the same month, making his debut on 24 October as a substitute in a 1–1 with Trafford. His first goal for the club came a week later, scoring the only goal of the game against Mossley at the DCBL Stadium, described by The Non-League Paper as a "thunderbolt". Upon returning to Salford, he made his debut on 8 December in the EFL Trophy second round fixture against the Leicester City Under-21 team, in which Salford were eliminated from the competition on penalties following a 3–3 draw. On 8 October 2021, having made two further appearances in the EFL Trophy during the 2021–22 season, he was loaned out to Matlock Town of the Northern Premier League. Sargent made his debut for The Gladiators the following day, starting the game against Atherton Collieries in midfield until being substituted in the 54th minute of an eventual 2–1 defeat.

In January 2022, he joined Ashton United on loan. He followed this up with another loan spell, joining Chester in mid-March. He scored on his debut for the club, just 87 seconds into his first game as the club beat Kettering Town 4–0 on 19 March.

In October 2022, he joined Buxton on loan.

Sargent was released by Salford at the end of the 2022–23 season. Following his departure, he joined Northern Premier League Premier Division club Radcliffe.

=== International career ===
Internationally, Sargent has represented Wales at youth level for the U16 and U17 teams, both during 2017. He made his first and only appearance for the U16's on 30 April, starting in a 1–1 draw with San Marino. In September, Sargent was called up for the Wales U17 double-header in Llanelli against Scotland, and started the first of the two games, a 2–0 defeat. The following month, he was called up for the 2018 UEFA European Under-17 Championship qualification matches against Hungary, Kosovo, and Netherlands, starting the match against Kosovo.

== Career statistics ==
As of 11 September 2024

Club	Season	League			National Cup		League Cup		Other		Total	
Club	Season	Division	Apps	Goals	Apps	Goals	Apps	Goals	Apps	Goals	Apps	Goals
Wrexham	2018–19	National League	1	0	0	0	—		1 (Note: Appearance(s) in FA Trophy)	0	2	0
Wrexham	2019–20	National League	0	0	0	0	—		0	0	0	0
Wrexham	Total		1	0	0	0	—		1	0	2	0
Airbus (loan)	2019–20	Cymru Premier	17	1	0	0	—		0	0	17	1
Salford City	2020–21	League Two	0	0	0	0	0	0	1 (Note: Appearance(s) in EFL Trophy)	0	1	0
Salford City	2021–22	League Two	0	0	0	0	0	0	2	0	2	0
Salford City	2022–23	League Two	0	0	0	0	0	0	1	0	1	0
Salford City	Total		0	0	0	0	—		4	0	4	0
Widnes (loan)	2020–21	NPL Division One North	3	1	0	0	—		0	0	3	1
Matlock Town (loan)	2021–22	NPL Premier Division	5	0	0	0	—		3	1	8	1
Ashton United (loan)	2021–22	NPL Premier Division	7	0	0	0	—		0	0	7	0
Chester (loan)	2021–22	National League North	11	1	0	0	—		0	0	11	1
Buxton (loan)	2022–23	National League North	10	0	0	0	—		4	0	14	0
Warrington Rylands (loan)	2022–23	NPL Premier Division	10	3	0	0	—		0	0	10	3
Radcliffe	2023–24	NPL Premier Division	24	4	0	0	—		3 (Note: Two appearances in FA Trophy, one appearance and one goal in Lancashire FA Challenge Trophy)	1	27	5
Radcliffe	2024–25	National League North	42	3	0	0	—		6	0	48	3
Radcliffe	2025–26	National League North	26	1	0	0	—		4	0	30	1
Radcliffe	Total		92	8	0	0	—		13	1	105	9
Career totals			156	14	0	0	0	0	25	2	181	16
