= Kevin Glendon =

English footballer & manager (born 1961)

Personal information
- Full name: Kevin William Glendon
- Date of birth: 21 June 1961 (age 65)
- Place of birth: Manchester, England
- Position: Midfielder

Senior career*
| Years | Team | Apps | (Gls) |
| 1979–1980 | Manchester City | 0 | (0) |
| 1980–1981 | Crewe Alexandra | 4 | (0) |
| 1981–1983 | Hyde United | 94 | (7) |
| 1983–1984 | Burnley | 4 | (0) |
| 1984 | Witton Albion | 5 | (0) |
| 1984–1986 | Mossley | 95 | (9) |
| 1986–1987 | Northwich Victoria | | |
| 1987 | Macclesfield Town | 14 | (0) |
| 1987–1989 | Hyde United | 42 | (7) |
| 1990 | Macclesfield Town | 1 | (0) |

Managerial career
- 1990–2010: Radcliffe Borough
- * Club domestic league appearances and goals

Kevin William Glendon (born 21 June 1961) is an English former professional association footballer who played as a midfielder. After his retirement from playing, he spent 20 years in charge of Radcliffe Borough.

Glendon was with Manchester City before joining Crewe Alexandra. He played four times in the 1980–81 season before joining Hyde United. He joined Burnley in December 1983, but was limited to four league appearances there as well and, after being released in May 1984, joined Witton Albion. He joined Mossley in September 1984, where he remained until being transferred to Northwich Victoria, for a fee of £200, in October 1986.

He became the regional director of coaching for the players' union, quitting in 1990 to become the full-time manager of Radcliffe Borough. In September 2010, Glendon resigned as manager of Radcliffe, ending a 20-year relationship with the club.

His son George is also a professional footballer.
