= Stainton Park =

Football ground in Radcliffe, Greater Manchester, England

Coordinates: 53°34′3.299″N 2°20′26.542″W

Stainton Park, currently known as the Neuven Stadium for sponsorship purposes, is a football ground in Radcliffe, Greater Manchester, which has hosted Radcliffe F.C. since 1970. It has a capacity of 3,500 (350 seated).

Prior to 1970, the Club had played its home games at a ground at Bright Street, Radcliffe, until the site was selected for redevelopment.

After a 12-month period in which Radcliffe Borough were forced to play their Lancashire Combination games outside the town (at the Whitehouse Sports Ground, Crumpsall) the Club were then able to move to the current site at Red Bank, Pilkington Road, Radcliffe, which was subsequently named Stainton Park after Mr. Henry Stainton, a local builder and the Club's president.

The first competitive fixture at the new ground is understood to have been Radcliffe Borough's home Lancashire Combination league fixture against Wigan Rovers on Saturday 6 September 1969. A Lancashire Combination Cup tie against Formby had been scheduled for the previous Saturday, but was called off late due to the pitch having been deemed to be unfit.

The ground record attendance for a match involving Radcliffe was the Bank Holiday Monday game (28 August 2023) game when 2,338 fans turned up to watch Radcliffe defeat FC United of Manchester 5-0.

2,473 spectators were at the venue on Saturday 17 September 2005 for a North West Counties League Division Two fixture between Castleton Gabriels and FC United of Manchester.

The ground has in recent years been upgraded with floodlights, an all-weather pitch, terracing, and a sports clinic. The ground has always been known as Stainton Park but has been officially renamed Neuven Stadium for its sponsorship by Neuven Solutions Limited. Radcliffe FC have had a ground-sharing agreement with Bury AFC since August 2020 although this arrangement ended during the first half of 2023 with the Bury club having now moved back to Gigg Lane after a temporary ground share at Mossley.
