= Corrie Ndaba =

Irish footballer

Personal information
- Full name: Corrie Richard Ndaba
- Date of birth: 25 December 1999 (age 26)
- Place of birth: Dublin, Ireland
- Height: 6 ft 2 in (1.88 m)
- Positions: Centre-back; left-back

Team information
- Current team: Lecce
- Number: 3

Youth career
- Palmerstown
- Cherry Orchard
- 2016–2019: Ipswich Town

Senior career*
Years	Team	Apps	(Gls)
2019–2024	Ipswich Town	0	(0)
2019	→ Hemel Hempstead Town (loan)	1	(0)
2019–2020	→ Chelmsford City (loan)	0	(0)
2021	→ Ayr United (loan)	13	(0)
2021–2022	→ Salford City (loan)	29	(2)
2022–2023	→ Burton Albion (loan)	7	(0)
2023	→ Fleetwood Town (loan)	8	(0)
2023–2024	→ Kilmarnock (loan)	28	(1)
2024–2025	Kilmarnock	36	(1)
2025–	Lecce	16	(0)

International career^{‡}
2016	Republic of Ireland U18	1	(0)
2026–	Republic of Ireland	2	(0)
- * Club domestic league appearances and goals as of 11:47, 2 September 2026 ‡ National team caps and goals as of 03:09, 6 June 2026 (UTC)

Corrie Richard Ndaba (born 25 December 1999) is an Irish professional footballer who plays as a centre-back or left-back for Serie A club Lecce and the Republic of Ireland national team.

Ndaba made his professional debut while on loan with Scottish club Ayr United, and was voted as the Supporters Player of the Year while on loan to Salford City, and has also spent time at Burton Albion.

== Club career ==
=== Youth career ===
Ndaba is from the Dublin suburb of Palmerstown and began playing football with local club Palmerstown FC, before moving to nearby academy club Cherry Orchard, where he went on to earn his move to England.

=== Ipswich Town ===
Ndaba joined the Ipswich Town Academy as a scholar in 2016. He featured regularly for Ipswich's U23s during the 2018–19 season as Ipswich won the Professional Development League South Division. He signed his first professional contract in February 2019, signing a three-year deal with the option of an additional year extension. Upon signing the contract, Ipswich manager Paul Lambert said that because Ndaba was left-footed, he had a chance to make it at the club if he improved his physique.

In November, it was announced that he was to move on loan to National League South team Chelmsford City for one month, but the move was delayed due to financial difficulties suffered by Chelmsford. Instead, he and teammate Bailey Clements were sent on loan to Hemel Hempstead Town for a month, where they were managed by former Ipswich player Sammy Moore. After his loan at Hemel Hempstead ended, he finally joined Chelmsford for a month. In January 2020, he was set to move on loan to Scottish Championship team Ayr United with teammate Aaron Drinan, but the move fell through due to his two prior loan spells earlier in the season.

Ndaba made his first-team debut for Ipswich on 5 September 2020, featuring as a second-half substitute in a 3–0 home win over Bristol Rovers in the EFL Cup. On 7 January 2021, Ndaba joined Ayr United on loan from the remainder of the 2020–21 season. He made his debut for Ayr on 23 January, keeping a clean sheet in a 0–0 draw away at Dunfermline Athletic. Ndaba was one of several Ayr defenders described by manager David Hopkin as "embarrassing" following a 3–0 defeat to Dundee on 6 April. He made 14 appearances during his loan spell at Ayr. Ndaba described his time at Ayr as "a good experience for me", adding that the football was "very physical up there and as a young centre-half it's good for me to experience that".

It's been unbelievable for me, I don't really have words to describe it. The love they've shown throughout the whole season, I've never experienced anything like this, so I can only thank them. Chanting my name every game, even in the town, it's just unbelievable.

— Ndaba talking about being a fan favourite at Salford City

==== Salford City (loan) ====
On 21 August 2021, Ndaba moved on loan to League Two team Salford City. On 27 August, he signed a new two-year contract with Ipswich, extending his stay at the club until 2023 with the option of an additional one-year extension. Speaking to the East Anglian Daily Times, Ndaba said his loan move was necessary for experience; "I'm physically ready but there are a lot of things you need to learn. This loan will benefit me and give me a better chance", and noting that the football played is "physical but we try to play as well... it's a mixture of that and it's going to benefit me". On 3 April 2022, he scored his first senior goal, the opening goal in a 2–0 away win against Hartlepool United. At the end of Salford's season, Ndaba was voted as the Supporters' Player of the Year. In total, he made 30 appearances in both his natural position of centre-back and at left-back, where he earned rave reviews, and scored two goals.

==== Burton Albion, Fleetwood Town and Kilmarnock loans ====
On 27 July 2022, Ndaba signed a new three-year contract with Ipswich Town. On 19 August 2022, Ndaba signed for Burton Albion on a season-long loan. On 31 January 2023, Ndaba's loan was terminated and he joined Fleetwood Town until the end of the season. On 22 June 2023, Ndaba joined Scottish Premiership side Kilmarnock on loan until the end of the 2023–24 season.

=== Kilmarnock ===
On 30 July 2024, Ndaba signed for Scottish Premiership Kilmarnock on a three-year deal.

=== Lecce ===
On 28 July 2025, Ndaba signed for Serie A club Lecce on an initial three-year deal for an undisclosed fee.

== International career ==
Born in Ireland, Ndaba is of South African descent. He won one cap for the Republic of Ireland U18 side in 2016. In March 2019, he was called up by Stephen Kenny to the Republic of Ireland U21 squad for European Championships qualifiers. Ndaba made his senior Republic of Ireland debut on 28 May 2026, replacing Liam Scales from the bench in a 1–0 win over Qatar at the Aviva Stadium.

== Style of play ==
Ndaba began his career as a centre midfielder at Cherry Orchard, but was converted to a centre defender upon signing for Ipswich. He is a quick player, who uses his strength and good positional sense to perform well in defence. He is a left-footed player, and was a captain in youth football due to his vocal nature. His manager at Ayr United, Mark Kerr, described him as "a big, strong, athletic defender who is quick and good on the ball", and his manager at Salford, Gary Bowyer, described him similarly as a player with "great pace, he's a ball-playing centre-half, but he's competitive as well". Former Ipswich manager Paul Cook praised his willingness to get involved, saying "he's naturally aggressive, he wants to engage and have contact". In 2021, Ndaba described himself as "a modern-day centre-half. I can play, I'm aggressive, I'm tall, so I have a bit of everything really".

== Career statistics ==
=== Club ===
As of match played on 31 August 2026

Appearances and goals by club, season and competition
Club	Season	League			National cup (Note: Includes FA Cup, Scottish Cup, Coppa Italia)		League cup (Note: Includes EFL Cup, Scottish League Cup)		Continental		Other		Total	
Club	Season	Division	Apps	Goals	Apps	Goals	Apps	Goals	Apps	Goals	Apps	Goals	Apps	Goals
Ipswich Town	2018–19	Championship	0	0	0	0	0	0	—		—		0	0
Ipswich Town	2019–20	League One	0	0	0	0	0	0	—		0	0	0	0
Ipswich Town	2020–21	League One	0	0	0	0	1	0	—		3 (Note: Appearance(s) in EFL Trophy)	0	4	0
Ipswich Town	2021–22	League One	0	0	0	0	1	0	—		0	0	1	0
Ipswich Town	2022–23	League One	0	0	0	0	0	0	—		0	0	0	0
Ipswich Town	2023–24	Championship	0	0	0	0	0	0	—		—		0	0
Ipswich Town	Total		0	0	0	0	2	0	—		3	0	5	0
Hemel Hempstead Town (loan)	2019–20	National League South	1	0	0	0	—		—		0	0	1	0
Chelmsford City (loan)	2019–20	National League South	0	0	0	0	—		—		0	0	0	0
Ayr United (loan)	2020–21	Scottish Championship	13	0	1	0	0	0	—		0	0	14	0
Salford City (loan)	2021–22	League Two	29	2	0	0	0	0	—		2	0	31	2
Burton Albion (loan)	2022–23	League One	7	0	2	0	0	0	—		2	0	11	0
Fleetwood Town (loan)	2022–23	League One	8	0	0	0	0	0	—		0	0	8	0
Kilmarnock (loan)	2023–24	Scottish Premiership	28	1	3	0	6	0	—		—		37	1
Kilmarnock	2024–25	Scottish Premiership	36	1	1	0	0	0	1 (Note: Appearance(s) in UEFA Conference League)	0	—		38	1
Kilmarnock	2025–26	Scottish Premiership	—		—		1	0	—		—		1	0
Kilmarnock	Total		36	1	1	0	1	0	1	0	—		39	1
Lecce	2025–26	Serie A	14	0	1	0	—		—		—		15	0
Lecce	2026–27	Serie A	2	0	0	0	—		—		—		2	0
Lecce	Total		16	0	1	0	—		—		—		17	0
Career total			138	4	8	0	9	0	1	0	7	0	163	4

=== International ===
As of match played on 5 June 2026

Appearances and goals by national team and year
National team	Year	Apps	Goals
Republic of Ireland
Republic of Ireland	2026	2	0
Total		2	0

== Honours ==
Individual

- Salford City Player of the Year: 2021–22
