= Ollie Younger =

English footballer

Personal information
- Full name: Oliver James Younger
- Date of birth: 14 November 1999 (age 27)
- Place of birth: Skipton, England
- Height: 6 ft 0 in (1.83 m)
- Position: Centre back

Youth career
- 2007–2018: Burnley

Senior career*
Years	Team	Apps	(Gls)
2018–2020	Burnley	0	(0)
2020	→ St Patrick's Athletic (loan)	2	(0)
2020–2022	Sunderland	1	(0)
2022–2023	Doncaster Rovers	16	(0)
2026–	Bury	0	(0)
- * Club domestic league appearances and goals as of 12:52, 15 November 2026 (UTC)

Oliver James Younger (born 14 November 1999) is an English professional footballer who plays as a centre back for Northern Premier League side Bury. He started his career with Burnley, where he spent time on loan at St Patrick's Athletic, before moving on to Sunderland and Doncaster Rovers.

== Career ==
=== Early career ===
He began his career with Burnley in 2007, aged 7 years old. He grew up a fan of the club and was a season ticket holder at the club for 15 years. He was in the same youth teams as England U21 international Dwight McNeil.

=== Burnley ===
On 10 February 2018, Younger alongside fellow youth teammate Dwight McNeil were included in Sean Dyche's first team squad for the Premier League game away to Swansea City. Younger signed his first professional contract with the club in April 2018, signing a 2 year deal.

==== St Patrick's Athletic loan ====
On 13 February 2020, the day before their first game of the season, it was announced that Younger had signed for League of Ireland Premier Division side St Patrick's Athletic on loan until 31 July. He made his debut in senior football in a 2–0 win away to Sligo Rovers in which Younger was sent off after receiving 2 yellow cards within 5 minutes of each other. His next appearance came against Cork City at Richmond Park and resulted in more bad luck for Younger as he was hospitalized after receiving 10 minutes of treatment on the pitch following an elbow to the jaw which saw him lose consciousness. This proved to be his last appearance for the club as the league was postponed due to the COVID-19 pandemic and did not resume until after Younger's loan spell at the club was up.

=== Sunderland ===
It was announced in September 2020 that Younger had signed for Sunderland, initially linking up with their under-23 side. He made his Sunderland first team debut on 10 November 2020, in a 2–1 loss to Fleetwood Town in the EFL Trophy. Younger made his league debut for the club on 6 March 2021, playing at right-back in a 2–0 win over Rochdale at the Stadium of Light. On the 14th March 2021, Younger won the first silverware of his senior career as he was an unused substitute in a 1–0 win over Tranmere Rovers in the 2021 EFL Trophy Final at Wembley Stadium, having made 3 appearances in the competition on the way to the final.

=== Doncaster Rovers ===
On 19 January 2022, Younger joined League One's bottom side Doncaster Rovers on an eighteen-month deal. He made 16 appearances for the club by the end of the season, as they were relegated to EFL League Two. Younger suffered a long term injury during pre-season ahead of the 2022–23 season, snapping his hamstring. In February 2023, just weeks ahead of his return to playing, he suffered a relapse of the hamstring injury in the final stages of his recovery, which would rule him out for the rest of the season. On 19 May 2023, it was announced that Younger would be released by the club following the end of his contract, but was invited back for pre-season training in an aim to help him regain his fitness.

=== Bury ===
After three-and-a-half years without a club, Younger signed for Northern Premier League Premier Division side Bury in November 2026.

== Career statistics ==
As of match played 23 April 2022

Club	Season	League			National Cup		League Cup		Other		Total	
Club	Season	Division	Apps	Goals	Apps	Goals	Apps	Goals	Apps	Goals	Apps	Goals
Burnley	2017–18	Premier League	0	0	0	0	0	0	—		0	0
Burnley	2018–19	Premier League	0	0	0	0	0	0	0 (Note: Appearances in UEFA Europa League)	0	0	0
Burnley	2019–20	Premier League	0	0	0	0	0	0	—		0	0
Burnley	Total		0	0	0	0	0	0	0	0	0	0
St Patrick's Athletic (loan)	2020	LOI Premier Division	2	0	—		—		—		2	0
Sunderland	2020–21	League One	1	0	0	0	0	0	3 (Note: Appearances in EFL Trophy)	0	4	0
Sunderland	2021–22	League One	0	0	0	0	1	0	4	0	5	0
Sunderland	Total		1	0	0	0	1	0	7	0	9	0
Doncaster Rovers	2021–22	League One	16	0	—		—		—		16	0
Doncaster Rovers	2022–23	League Two	0	0	0	0	0	0	0	0	0	0
Doncaster Rovers	Total		16	0	0	0	0	0	0	0	16	0
Bury	2026–27	NPL Premier Division	0	0	—		—		0	0	0	0
Career Total			19	0	0	0	1	0	7	0	27	0

== Honours ==
Sunderland

- EFL Trophy: 2020–21
