= Radcliffe F.C. =

Association football club in Greater Manchester, England

Coordinates: 53°34′3.299″N 2°20′26.542″W

Radcliffe
- Full name: Radcliffe Football Club
- Nickname: The Boro
- Founded: 24 May 1949
- Ground: Stainton Park, Radcliffe
- Capacity: 3,500 (350 seated)
- Chairman: Billy Quarmby
- Manager: Grant Shenton
- League: National League North
- 2025–26: National League North, 13th of 24
- Website: www.radcliffefc.com
Home colours	Away colours	Third colours

Radcliffe Football Club (formerly Radcliffe Borough) is an English football club based in Radcliffe, Greater Manchester, where they play their home games at Stainton Park. The club was formed on 24 May 1949 and currently plays in the National League North, the sixth tier of the English football league system, after winning the 2023–24 Northern Premier League Premier Division title. Radcliffe won the Northern Premier League First Division in 1996–97, reached the first round of the FA Cup for the only time in its history in 2000, and won league playoffs in 2003 and 2019. The club changed its name to Radcliffe Football Club for the 2018–19 season.

== History ==
The club was formed on 24 May 1949 at the Owd Tower Inn in Radcliffe by Jack Pickford and a committee of 17 and became a member of the South East Lancashire Football League. It had two players (Tommy Entwistle and Bert Nutter), £1.2s.6d (£1.12½p) in the bank, and no ground, but arranged to lease a field off Ashworth Street for two years. In 1951–52 the club moved across Eton Hill Road to a pitch on Betley Street leased from the Earl of Wilton. The following year the club turned the pitch 180 degrees parallel with Bright Street which became the name of the ground.

After a short period in the South East Lancashire League, the club joined the Manchester League, playing against the 'A' teams of four professional clubs: Manchester United, Manchester City, Stockport County and Bury. The home game against Manchester Utd was lost 5-1 but three weeks later Boro’ won the return game at The Cliff 1-0 against the Busby Babes - their only home defeat in two seasons. In 1955–56, Boro’ had their best finish in second place and in 1956–57 they finished third. In 1958–59, they reached the Manchester Junior Cup Final at Old Trafford losing to Cheadle Rovers by the only goal. Five days later they faced Cheadle Rovers again, in the William Gilgryst Cup Final at Bury; the game finished 0–0 after which the Cup was shared for six months each. In 1961–62, Boro’ again reached the Gilgryst Cup Final against Buxton Reserves at Ashton United's ground but lost 1–2 AET.

In 1963–64 the Club joined the Lancashire Combination Division 2, a great wish of club founder Jack Pickford. In August 1966, the club was informed it would have to leave Bright Street and find another ground after the Earl of Wilton decided to sell the land to the Ministry of Housing. In 1968–69, having been refused a site on Bury Road in Radcliffe, the club moved to the White House sports ground on Middleton Road (outside Bowker Vale tram stop), owned by Manchester Corporation Transport Dept. A new ground was then found in Stainton Park; the old wooden stands were brought from Bright Street and erected at the new ground and a pitch was laid in June 1969.

In 1970, Radcliffe won the League Cup and finished third in the league. After one further season it was accepted into the Cheshire County League, but throughout the rest of the 1970s the team struggled and were finally relegated to Div 2 in 1979–80. The Cheshire County League subsequently became the North West Counties League and that change saw an upturn in fortunes for 'The Boro'.

The first season again brought success when Radcliffe secured the Second Division championship in front of a then record Stainton Park crowd of 1,468. After one season in the First Division, Radcliffe lifted the First Division championship in 1985 and made the step up into the newly formed Northern Premier League First Division in 1987. After many years of consolidation in the league, and at times, fighting against relegation, the 1995–96 season saw an upturn in the club's fortunes, both on and off the pitch. The club, for the first time in its history, reached the last 16 of the FA Trophy, narrowly losing to Football Conference side, Gateshead 2–1.

Radcliffe achieved its highest honour in the 1996–97 season, winning the Northern Premier League First Division title by two points from local rivals Leigh RMI. The club's stay in tier six lasted only one season.

The club reached the first round of the FA Cup in 2000, losing 1–4 to York City in a match played at Gigg Lane, the home of Bury, in front of a crowd of 2,495. Boro again missed out on promotion in the 2001–02 season. After leading the division until February, a poor run to the end of the season meant the club entered the newly formed play-offs, losing to Bamber Bridge in the semi-final at Irongate.

In the 2002–03 season Boro missed out on the championship by two points to Alfreton Town, and reached the 4th qualifying round of the FA Cup, losing to Chester City in front of 1,138 at Stainton Park. Promotion was finally won via the play-offs. Boro beat North Ferriby United in the semi-final and Chorley in the final at Stainton Park, winning 4–2 on penalties after Chorley scored two goals in the last 10 minutes to make it 2–2 and take the game into extra time. Boro's Jody Banim got 46 goals in the season.

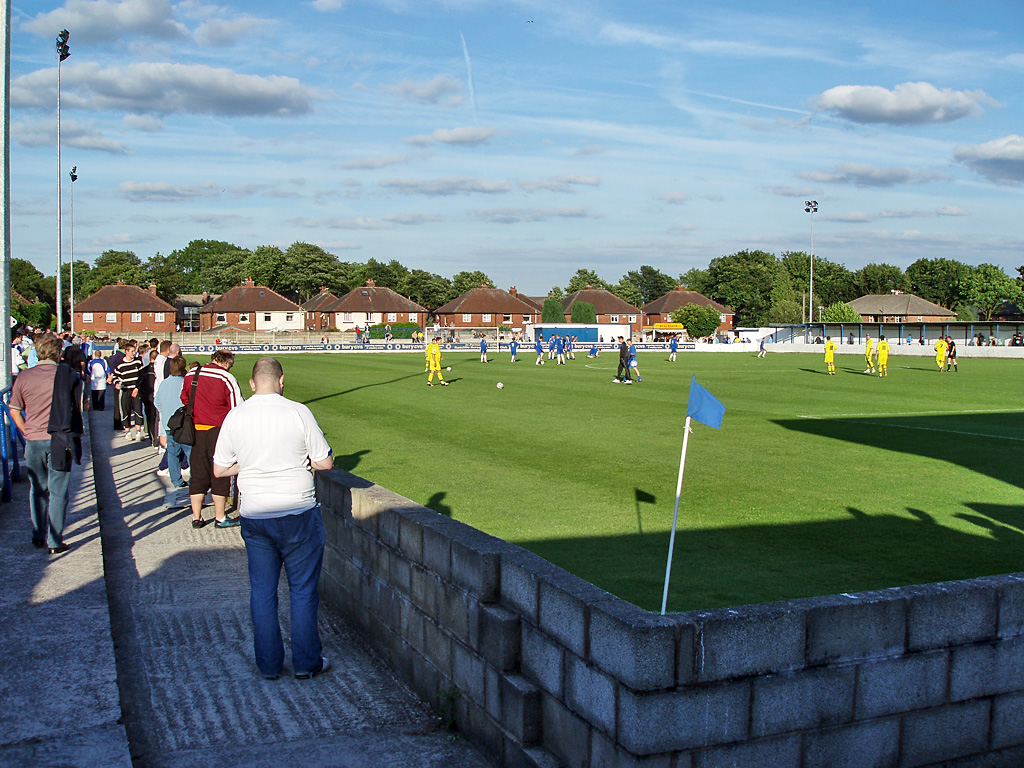
Stainton Park during a friendly against neighbours Bury in 2006

With Boro back in the Northern Premier League Premier Division and a place in the newly formed Conference North up for grabs, promotion was the obvious aim. By November Boro were sixth thanks to 22 goals by Jody Banim, who set an English record by scoring in 14 consecutive games. Boro sold Banim to Conference promotion chasers Shrewsbury Town for a record fee of £20,000 in December 2003, and, without his goals, the club slid down the table eventually finishing 19th. In the relegation play-offs, Boro beat Whitby Town on penalties 8–7 in the quarter-finals, before bowing out to Burscough in the semi-finals. As a result, the club returned to tier seven following a pyramid restructure.

In 2004–05, the club finished ninth in the Northern Premier League. The club continued to be near the play-offs and solid midtable finishes followed but after four seasons were relegated back to the First Division in 2007, where the club remained until 2019.

In 2016, Paul Hilton, a new chairman took the reins. Off the field, investment was given to the stadium, including a new stand at the Pilkington Road end, a new press area, a new director's area, a new covered turnstile block, a TV gantry, boardroom, club shop, sponsors lounge and social club. The club changed name, officially dropping 'Borough', in 2018, having earlier reached the 2017 Lancashire Cup Final. With a new manager in charge (Jon Macken, with assistant Frank Sinclair) from October 2017, the club progressed and was promoted via the play-offs back to the Northern Premier League in 2019. The 2023–24 season saw Radcliffe crowned champions of the Northern Premier League Premier Division, earning promotion to the National League North for the first time and a return to Step 2 of the National League System after a 20-year absence.

== Women's team ==
In 1994-95, the first Radcliffe Borough Ladies team appeared at Stainton Park, after Bury Girls & Ladies joined the club and changed their name accordingly. The women competed in the North West Women's Regional League for three seasons under the Radcliffe Borough name, before re-establishing their links with Bury F.C. and taking Bury's name in 1997.

History somewhat repeated itself in 2023–24 when Bury Foundation Women established links with Radcliffe FC, moved to Stainton Park and changing their name to Radcliffe Women. They currently compete in the North West Women's Regional League under the management of Steve Jones, with a reserve team in the Lancashire Women's County League and an under-18s side in the Greater Manchester Women's Football League.

In the intervening years Blackburn Rovers W.F.C. played for a few seasons at Radcliffe's ground, Stainton Park.

== Players ==
As of 17 August 2026

Note: Flags indicate national team as defined under FIFA eligibility rules; some limited exceptions apply. Players may hold more than one non-FIFA nationality.

No.	Pos.	Nation	Player
1	GK	ENG	Tom Donaghy
2	MF	SKN	Michael Nottingham
3	DF	SCO	Callum McFadzean
4	DF	ENG	Rick Smith
5	DF	ENG	Tom Davies
6	DF	SKN	Lois Maynard
7	MF	ENG	Brad Jackson
8	MF	WAL	Matt Sargent
9	FW	ENG	Jordan Hulme
10	FW	IRL	Michael Afuye
11	FW	ENG	Jon Taylor
12	DF	IRL	Josh Seary
13	GK	ENG	Ellis Craven
14	FW	ENG	Kyle Hawley

No.	Pos.	Nation	Player
15	DF	ENG	Brad Roscoe
16	FW	ENG	Tyler James
17	FW	ENG	Rio Clegg
18	MF	ENG	Ben Collins
19	GK	ENG	Dylan Halford
20	FW	ENG	Max McCarthy
21	DF	ENG	Charlie Wheeler
22	MF	ENG	Danny Greenfield
23	MF	ENG	Jude Oyibo
24	MF	ENG	Harley O'Grady-Macken
25	DF	ENG	Luke Partington
27	DF	ENG	George Mercer
30	GK	ENG	Frankie Valentine

== Notable players ==
The following players played for Radcliffe/Boro and later went on to sign for clubs in the Football League, Scottish Football League, MLS, A-League, I-League or played internationally while at the club.

- (England) Gary Curtis
- (England) Craig Dawson
- (England) Steve Fleet
- (Bermuda) Kole Hall
- (Saint Kitts and Nevis) Raheem Hanley
- (England) Niell Hardy
- (England) Brian Hart
- (England) Jimmy Hayman
- (England) Kevin Hulme
- (England) Bob Hutchinson
- (The Gambia) Lamin Jagne
- (Saint Kitts and Nevis) Lois Maynard
- (England) Jack McIntyre
- (England) Paul Mullin
- (England) Billy Myerscough
- (Belgium) Tunde Owolabi
- (England) Andy Parry
- (Northern Ireland) Rory Patterson
- (England) Gary Pierce
- (England) Dennis Jones
- (England) Edward Rayner
- (England) Mark Redshaw
- (England) Domaine Rouse
- (England) Darren Sheridan
- (England) Jordan Slew
- (Hong Kong) Sean Tse
- (South Korea) Isaac Lee
- (Republic of Ireland) Abimbola Obasoto
- (Bermuda) Blayz Borgesson

The following players have played at the highest level of English football or internationally and later turned out for the Boro.

- (England) Gordon Armstrong
- (England) Arthur Barnard
- (England) Peter Barnes
- (England) Ian Bishop
- (England) Frankie Bunn
- (England) Len Cantello
- (England) Gordon Clayton
- (England) Nick Culkin
- (Guyana) Neil Danns
- (England) Mike Flynn
- (England) John Foster
- (Scotland) Tommy Heron
- (England) Gordon Hill
- (England) Fred Hill
- (England) Paul Gascoigne
- (Scotland) David Goodwillie
- (Turkey) Jem Karacan
- (England) Alan Kennedy
- (England) Dave Lennard
- (England) Chris Makin
- (Scotland) Trevor Ross
- (England) Lee Sharpe
- (England) Darren Sheridan
- (England) Neil Whitworth
- (England) Frank Worthington
- (Saint Kitts and Nevis) Michael Nottingham

== Honours ==
=== League ===
- Northern Premier League Premier Division
  - Champions: 2023–24
- Northern Premier League Division One
  - Champions: 1996–97
  - Play-off winners: 2002–03 2018–19
- North West Counties League First Division
  - Champions: 1984–85
- North West Counties League Second Division
  - Champions: 1982–83
- North West Counties League Reserve Division
  - Champions: 1986–87
- Manchester Football League Division Two
  - Runners-up: 1965–66
- Northern Football Combination
  - Winners: 1991–92
- South East Lancashire League Division One
  - Runners-up: 1949–50, 1950-51
- South East Lancashire League Division Two
  - Champions: 1950–51

=== Cup ===
- FA Cup Best - First Round Proper: 2000–01
- FA Trophy Best - Third Round (Last 16) : 1995–96
- FA Vase Best - Fourth Round: 1993–94
- Lancashire FA County Cup
  - Finalists: 2008–09, 2016–17
- Manchester Premier Cup
  - Winners: 2007–08, 2022–23
  - Finalists: 1997–98
- Manchester Senior Cup
  - Finalists: 1972-73
- Manchester Junior Cup
  - Finalists: 1958–59
- Northern Premier League President's Cup
  - Finalists: 2007–08
- North West Counties League Challenge Cup
  - Finalists: 1984–85
- Lancashire Combination League Cup
  - Winners: 1969–70
- Lancashire Combination League George Watson Trophy
  - Finalists: 1970–71
- Manchester League Gylchrist Cup
  - Winners: 1958–59 (joint)
  - Finalists: 1961–62
- South East Lancashire League Shield
  - Winners: 1949–50, 1950–51, 1951–52
- South East Lancashire League Moore Cup
  - Winners: 1950–51, 1952–53, 1954–55
- Bury Amateur League Cup
  - Winners: 1949–50

=== Players ===
The club has performed exceptionally well in the Northern Premier League's Player awards since their inception in 2011. The following players have picked up the following prizes:

- Jordan Hulme - Player of Season (Premier) - 2023–24, Team of the Season (Premier) - 2023–24, Third in Supporters Player award - 2023–24
- Elliot Rokka – Young Player of the Season (North Division) – 2017, Supporters Player Runner Up - 2017. Team of the Season - 2017
- Tunde Owolabi – League Supporters Player of the Season – 2019, Team of the Season - 2019
- Nick Culkin – Team of the Season - 2011, 2012
- Sheldon Barrington – Academy Player of the Season - 2019
- Callum Grogan – Team of the Season - 2019

9 Players were also represented in the Northern Premier League's Top 100 players named for its 50th Anniversary - Andy Johnston (7th), Craig Dawson (14th), Steve Howson (50th), Karl Marginson (62nd), Jody Banim (65th), Cieran Kilheeney (66th), Dave Ryan (68th), Colin Little (69th), Simon Carden (93rd). Craig Dawson and Steve Howson were both named as centre halves in the Northern Premier League 50th Anniversary XI.

== Managers ==
- John Pearson (1949–1953)
- John Bradshaw (1953–1954)
- David Robbie (1954–1955)
- Harry Cunliffe (1955–1963)
- Archie Lennon (1963–1964)
- John Pimlott (1964–1968)
- Les Grimsditch (1968–1969)
- Ray Gill (1969–1973)
- Don Wilson (1973–1974)
- Ken Wright (1974–1978)
- Tommy McLoughlin (1978–1979)
- George Jones (1979–1980)
- Dave Morris (1980–1986)
- Frank O'Kane (1986–1987)
- Ken Bridge (1988–1989)
- Len Cantello (1989–1990)
- Ken Wright (June-Nov 1990)
- Kevin Glendon (1990–2006)
- Frankie Bunn (March–May 1998)*
- Mike Farrelly (Dec 2001–2002)*
- Andy Johnston (2006-2007)
- Peter Coyne (2007-2008)
- Kevin Glendon (2008–2010)
- Gerry Luczka (2010–2011)
- Benny Phillips (2011–2013)
- Kevin Glendon (2013–2014)
- Paul McGuire (2014–2015)
- Bill Prendergast (2015)
- Danny Johnson (2015–2016)
- Bill Prendergast (2016–2017)
- Joe Gibbons (Apr-Sept 2017)
- Jon Macken (2017–2020)
- Lee Fowler (2020–2021)
- Bobby Grant (2021–2023)
- Anthony Johnson and Bernard Morley (2023–2026)
- Bernard Morley (2026)
- Grant Shenton (2026–present)

== Statistics and records ==
=== Appearances ===
- Simon Kelly has made the most appearances for the club, making 502 starts.

=== Goals ===
- Ian Lunt has scored the most goals for the club, scoring 147 times.
- The record for the most goals in a season is 46 by Jody Banim.

=== Biggest win ===
11-0 v New Mills - Cheshire County League Division Two - Wed 21 April 1982

=== Biggest defeat ===
11-0 v Witton Albion - Cheshire County League Division One - Sat 28 October 1978

=== Attendances ===
- The highest home attendance was during the 2024/25 FA Cup, where their first ever competitive meeting against Bury FC ended up with a sold out attendance of 2800.

=== Transfer fees ===
- The highest transfer fee received was from Shrewsbury Town for £20,000 for Jody Banim; however, the club has received more in add on fees from the sale of Craig Dawson to Rochdale AFC although the total sum remains undisclosed.
- The highest transfer fee paid was for Gary Walker for whom they paid £5,000 to Buxton.

=== Cup runs ===
- Best FA Cup performance: First round, 2000–01
- Best FA Trophy performance: Fourth round, 2023–24, 2024–25
- Best FA Vase performance: Fourth round 1993–94 (replay)
