= Jordan Hulme =

English footballer (born 1990)

Personal information
- Date of birth: 23 November 1990 (age 35)
- Place of birth: Ramsbottom, England
- Height: 6 ft 0 in (1.83 m)
- Position: Forward

Team information
- Current team: Radcliffe

Youth career
- Bolton Wanderers

Senior career*
Years	Team	Apps	(Gls)
- CMB Sports Club
2007	Darwen		
2008	Walshaw Sports Club		
- Shevington
2009	Leigh Genesis		
2010	Ashton Athletic		
2010-2011	Padiham		
2011	Clitheroe		
2012–2015	Ramsbottom United	98	(31)
2014	New Orleans Jesters		
2015–2017	Salford City	120	(31)
2017–2020	Altrincham	139	(70)
2020–2022	Fylde	22	(3)
2021–2022	→ Ashton United (loan)	4	(0)
2022	→ Altrincham(loan)	14	(2)
2022–2023	Altrincham	30	(5)
2023–	Radcliffe	59	(17)
- * Club domestic league appearances and goals

Jordan Hulme (23 November 1990) is an English footballer who plays as a forward for Radcliffe and has represented various teams in the English football league system.

== Career ==
=== Early career ===
Born in Ramsbottom, At 5 years old he was considered by many as one of the players of his generation. Hulme started his career at Padiham after playing for a number of junior sides and spending time in the youth system of Bolton Wanderers.

Whilst a student he turned out for a number of sides including Darwen F.C., Shevington, Leigh Genesis and Ashton Athletic where he was often deployed as a full back.

=== Ramsbottom United ===
Hulme signed for Ramsbottom United in January 2012 after impressing then managers Anthony Johnson and Bernard Morley the previous year in a rare defeat for The Rams.

Hulme enjoyed promotion from the North West Counties Premier Division is his first season at Ramsbottom which saw the side back in the 8th tier of English football for the first time since 1995.

Hulme enjoyed further success at Ramsbottom two years later when under Johnson and Morley the club earned their second promotion in three years following a 3–2 extra time win over Bamber Bridge in the Division One North play-off final.

=== New Orleans Jesters ===
That summer, Hulme and Ramsbottom teammate Phil Dean crossed the Atlantic to sign for New Orleans Jesters of the National Premier Soccer League where his side reached the Southeast Conference Playoff final before losing to eventual NPSL runners up Chattanooga FC .

=== Salford City ===
January 2015 saw Ramsbottom management duo Johnson and Morley join Salford City, who the year previous had been taken over by former Manchester United players Nicky Butt, Ryan Giggs, Gary Neville, Phil Neville, Paul Scholes and businessman Peter Lim, taking with them a number of Ramsbottom players, including Hulme.

Hulme spent two and a half seasons at Salford City, scoring 31 goals for the club as they won the NPL Division One North title in his first season and go on to earn back to back promotions by winning the NPL Premier Division play-offs in 2015–16.

Hulme notched double figures in his first season at step six, scoring 10 goals as Salford City finished 4th in the National League North and lost out in the playoffs.

=== Altrincham ===
Hulme departed Salford City in the summer and signed for recently relegated Northern Premier League side Altrincham, helping them return to the National League North at the first time of asking, finishing the side's top goalscorer and claiming the Brandon Hire Step 3/4 Player of the Year award.

During three seasons with The Robins Hulme amassed 70 goals across 139 games as Altrincham twice reached the National League North play-offs, winning them in 2020 to reach the National League for the first time in nine years.

=== Fylde ===
Despite reaching level 5 for the first time in his career, Hulme departed Altrincham in October 2020 for a 'substantial' undisclosed fee, dropping back down into National League North again to sign for Jim Bentley's Fylde who were seeking an instant return to the National League.

Hulme failed to hit the heights of his previous season's in the National League North and after less than a year, and having only scored three goals, he joined Ashton United on a 28-day loan in September 2021.

=== Altrincham ===
Following his short stint at Ashton United, Hulme rejoined Altrincham on loan in January 2022, which saw him finally appear in the National League where he scored two goals in 13 games before making the move permanent in the summer.

=== Radcliffe ===
Hulme was reunited with managerial duo Anthony Johnson and Bernard Morley the following year as he joined Radcliffe, again opting to drop down into the Northern Premier League where he won the Step 3/4 Player of the Year and the Northern Premier League, repeating the feat he achieved in 2018.

== Personal life ==
In 2019, Hulme joined former Salford City teammate Gareth Seddon as co-host of football podcast I Had Trials Once, focused on the trials and tribulations of being non-league footballers.

Over the next six years the podcast has featured many notable guests including Sam Allardyce, Charlie Adam, Matt Jarvis and David Dunn.

I Had Trials Once was awarded Gold at the Football Content Awards in 2024.

His father Martin 'Tommy' Hulme also played for Ramsbottom United when Jordan was a child

== Honours ==
Ramsbottom United

- North West Counties Premier Division

Salford City

- NPL Division One North

Altrincham

- Northern Premier League

Radcliffe

- Northern Premier League

Individual

- Step 3/4 Player of the Year 2018, 2024
- Radcliffe Supporters' Player of the Season 2024
