= David Ryan =

David or Dave Ryan may refer to:

== Sportspeople ==
- Dave Ryan (Australian footballer) (1885–1957), Australian rules footballer
- Dave Ryan (boxer) (born 1983), British boxer
- Dave Ryan (rugby union) (born 1986), Irish rugby union player
- David Ryan (footballer) (born 1957), English soccer player
- Dave Ryan (sportscaster) (born 1967), American play-by-play announcer
- Dave Ryan (American football) (1923–1988), American football quarterback

== Others ==
- David Ryan (Medal of Honor) (1836–1896), Indian Wars Medal of Honor recipient
- Dave Ryan (politician), mayor of Pickering, Ontario
- Dave Ryan (motorsport) (born 1954), former McLaren sporting director
- Dave "Chico" Ryan (1948–1998), musician
- Dave Ryan (radio), morning host of KDWB-FM, Minneapolis, MN
- David Ryan, drummer with The Lemonheads
