= James Melhado =

English footballer

Personal information
- Full name: James Joseph Melhado
- Date of birth: 29 January 2001 (age 25)
- Position: Defender

Team information
- Current team: Warrington Town

Youth career
- 2007–2016: Wolverhampton Wanderers
- 2017–2019: Burton Albion

Senior career*
Years	Team	Apps	(Gls)
2019–2021	Newcastle Town	17	(1)
2019–2020	→ Hanley Town (loan)	12	(1)
2021–2023	Salford City	0	(0)
2022	→ Ashton United (loan)	5	(0)
2022	→ AFC Telford United (loan)	13	(0)
2022	→ Hereford (loan)	3	(0)
2023–2024	Truro City		
2024–2025	Nantwich Town		
2025–	Warrington Town		
- * Club domestic league appearances and goals as of 16:01, 28 September 2025 (UTC)

James Joseph Melhado (born 29 January 2001) is an English professional footballer who plays as a defender for Warrington Town.

== Career ==
=== Early career ===
Melhado played youth football for Wolverhampton Wanderers for nine years until he was released by the club in late 2016. He then joined the youth set-up at Burton Albion.

His senior career began with spells in non-league football with Newcastle Town, and Hanley Town.

=== Salford City ===
He turned professional with Salford City in July 2021, signing a two-year contract. He made his debut for the club on 31 August 2021 in the EFL Trophy.

In January 2022 he joined Ashton United on loan. In February 2022 he joined AFC Telford United on loan.

On 25 November 2022 Melhado joined National League North club Hereford on a one-month loan. However the loan ended early in December 2022 after Melhado tore his hamstring.

Melhado was released by Salford at the end of the 2022–23 season.

=== Non-League ===
On 6 June 2023, Melhado was announced to have agreed to join newly promoted National League South club Truro City on a free transfer. In July 2024 he signed for Nantwich Town. In June 2025 he signed for Warrington Town.
