= 2020 EFL Trophy final =

2020 EFL Trophy Final
- Event: 2019–20 EFL Trophy
Portsmouth	Salford City
0	0
- After extra time Salford City won 4–2 on penalties
- Date: 13 March 2021
- Venue: Wembley Stadium, London
- Man of the Match: Václav Hladký
- Referee: Carl Boyeson
- Attendance: 0

The 2020 EFL Trophy Final (known for sponsorship reasons as the 2020 Papa John's Trophy Final) was a football match played at Wembley Stadium on 13 March 2021. It decided the winners of the 2019–20 EFL Trophy, the 36th edition of the competition, a knock-out tournament for the 48 teams in League One and League Two and 16 category one academy sides.

The final was contested by Portsmouth from League One, the defending champions and thus making their second successive final appearance, and Salford City from League Two, who made their finals debut.

Portsmouth and Salford City had never played against each other before this EFL Trophy Final meeting.

The final, which was originally scheduled for 5 April 2020, was postponed because of the effects of the COVID-19 pandemic in the United Kingdom and eventually rescheduled for 13 March 2021. The delay meant that Salford held the trophy only until the following day, when the 2021 final took place.

== Route to the final ==
=== Portsmouth ===
Pos	Div	Team	Pld	W	PW	PL	L	GF	GA	GD	Pts	Qualification
1	L1	Portsmouth	3	2	1	0	0	6	3	+3	8	Advance to Round 2
2	L1	Oxford United	3	2	0	1	0	8	4	+4	7	Advance to Round 2
3	ACA	Norwich City U21	3	1	0	0	2	4	6	−2	3	
4	L2	Crawley Town	3	0	0	0	3	2	7	−5	0	

Source: EFL.com

3 September 2019 Group stage	Portsmouth	1–0	Crawley Town	Portsmouth
19:45 BST	Pitman 70'	Report		Stadium: Fratton Park

14 September 2019 Group stage	Portsmouth	3–1	Norwich City U21	Portsmouth
12:30 BST	Harrison 10', 60'; Flint 44'	Report	Scully 67'	Stadium: Fratton Park

8 October 2019 Group stage	Oxford United	2–2 (4–5 p)	Portsmouth	Oxford
19:30 BST	Taylor 21'; Dickie 90+1'		Lethbridge 33'; Walkes 85'	Stadium: Kassam Stadium; Attendance: 1548
	Penalties
	Sole (penalty scored); Brannagan (penalty scored); Hall (penalty scored); Sykes (penalty scored); Ruffels (penalty missed); Agyei (penalty missed); Long (penalty missed)		Evans (penalty scored); Harrison (penalty scored); Close (penalty missed); Williams (penalty scored); Downing (penalty scored); Walkes (penalty missed); Haunstrup (penalty scored)

3 December 2019 Round 2	Portsmouth	2–1	Northampton Town	Portsmouth
19:45 GMT	Maloney 39'; Harness 62'		Harriman 12'	Stadium: Fratton Park

7 January 2020 Round 3	Walsall	1–2	Portsmouth	Walsall
19:45 GMT	Lavery 86' (pen.)	Report	Marquis 23'; Harrison 82'	Stadium: Bescot Stadium; Attendance: 1,082

21 January 2020 Quarter-Final	Portsmouth	2–1	Scunthorpe United	Portsmouth
19:45 GMT	Marquis 13'; McGeehan 66'	Report	Eisa 62'	Stadium: Fratton Park; Attendance: 5,832

18 February 2020 Semi-Final	Portsmouth	3–2	Exeter City	Portsmouth
19:45 GMT	Harness 86'; McGeehan 90+1'; Marquis 90+6'	Report	Taylor 79'; Burgess 89' (o.g.)	Stadium: Fratton Park; Attendance: 14,735; Referee: Craig Hicks

=== Salford City ===
Pos	Div	Team	Pld	W	PW	PL	L	GF	GA	GD	Pts	Qualification
1	L2	Salford City	2	2	0	0	0	4	0	+4	6	Advance to Round 2
2	L1	Tranmere Rovers	2	1	0	0	1	2	3	−1	3	Advance to Round 2
3	ACA	Aston Villa U21	2	0	0	0	2	1	4	−3	0	
4	—	Bury (Note: This group originally included the expelled Bury.)	0	0	0	0	0	0	0	0	0	Automatically eliminated from competition

Source: EFL.com
Notes:

3 September 2019 Group stage	Salford City	2–0	Aston Villa U21	Salford
19:45 BST	Lloyd 80' (pen.); Rooney 82'	Report		Stadium: Moor Lane; Attendance: 916

12 November 2019 Group stage	Tranmere Rovers	0–2	Salford City	Birkenhead
19:45 GMT		Report	Threlkeld 2'; Hogan 56'	Stadium: Prenton Park; Attendance: 1,196; Referee: James Adcock

3 December 2019 Round 2	Salford City	3–0	Wolverhampton Wanderers U21	Salford
19:45 GMT	Armstrong 43', 47'; Towell 87'	Report		Stadium: Moor Lane; Attendance: 505

7 January 2020 Round 3	Salford City	3–0	Port Vale	Salford
19:45 GMT	Burgess 35'; Armstrong 79'; Jervis 84'	Report		Stadium: Moor Lane; Attendance: 630

21 January 2020 Quarter-Final	Salford City	2–1	Accrington Stanley	Salford
19:45 GMT	Burgess 45+3'; Elliott 49'	Report	Finley 11'	Stadium: Moor Lane; Attendance: 1,401

19 February 2020 Semi-Final	Newport County	0–0 (5–6 p)	Salford City	Newport
19:45 GMT		Report		Stadium: Rodney Parade; Attendance: 4,070; Referee: Anthony Backhouse
	Penalties
	Demetriou (penalty scored); Sheehan (penalty scored); Abrahams (penalty missed); Labadie (penalty scored); Dolan (penalty scored); Matt (penalty scored); Inniss (penalty missed)		Rooney (penalty scored); Touray (penalty scored); Jervis (penalty scored); Conway (penalty scored); Thomas-Asante (penalty missed); Gibson (penalty scored); Wilson (penalty scored)

== Match ==
13 March 2021
15:00 GMT

Portsmouth	0–0 (a.e.t.)	Salford City
	Report
Penalties
Williams (penalty missed); Curtis (penalty missed); Brown (penalty scored); Raggett (penalty scored)	2–4	(penalty scored) Burgess; (penalty scored) Dieseruvwe; (penalty scored) Thomas-Asante; (penalty scored) Lowe

Wembley Stadium, London
Attendance: 0
Referee: Carl Boyeson

Portsmouth	Salford City

GK	1	(Scotland) Craig MacGillivray
RB	13	(England) James Bolton	(yellow card) 73'
CB	6	(England) Jack Whatmough
CB	20	(England) Sean Raggett
LB	21	(England) Charlie Daniels		(substituted off) 45'
RM	7	(Australia) Ryan Williams
CM	4	(England) Tom Naylor	(yellow card) 95'
CM	16	(Scotland) George Byers		(substituted off) 73'
LM	23	(England) Harvey White		(substituted off) 45'
CF	26	(England) Jordy Hiwula-Mayifuila		(substituted off) 45'
CF	9	(England) John Marquis		(substituted off) 105'
Substitutes:
GK	22	(England) Lewis Ward
DF	8	(England) Ben Close		(substituted on) 73'
DF	15	(Denmark) Rasmus Nicolaisen
DF	3	(England) Lee Brown	(yellow card) 114'	(substituted on) 45'
MF	11	(Republic of Ireland) Ronan Curtis		(substituted on) 45'
MF	19	(England) Marcus Harness		(substituted on) 45'
MF	24	(England) Michael Jacobs		(substituted on) 105'
Manager:
(Wales) Kenny Jackett

GK	1	(Czech Republic) Václav Hladký
RB	6	(England) Tom Clarke		(substituted off) 115'
CB	5	(England) Ashley Eastham
CB	16	(England) Jordan Turnbull
LB	3	(The Gambia) Ibou Touray	(yellow card) 119'
DM	4	(England) Jason Lowe	(yellow card) 90+1'
DM	18	(England) Oscar Threlkeld
RM	17	(Republic of Ireland) Richie Towell	(yellow card) 14'	(substituted off) 99'
LM	10	(England) Ashley Hunter		(substituted off) 74'
MF	37	(England) Brandon Thomas-Asante
CF	19	(England) James Wilson		(substituted off) 87'
Substitutes:
GK	31	(England) William Hayden Evans
DF	35	(England) Sam Fielding
MF	15	(England) Luke Burgess		(substituted on) 87'
MF	33	(England) Liam Loughlan		(substituted on) 115'
MF	36	(Wales) Dan Hawkins
FW	20	(England) Emmanuel Dieseruvwe		(substituted on) 99'
FW	35	(Portugal) Bruno Andrade		(substituted on) 74'
Manager:
(England) Richie Wellens
