= Di'Shon Bernard =

Jamaican footballer (born 2000)

Personal information
- Full name: Di'Shon Joel Bernard
- Date of birth: 14 October 2000 (age 26)
- Place of birth: Wandsworth, England
- Height: 6 ft 2 in (1.89 m)
- Position: Centre-back

Team information
- Current team: Sheffield Wednesday
- Number: 5

Youth career
- –2017: Chelsea
- 2017–2019: Manchester United

Senior career*
Years	Team	Apps	(Gls)
2019–2023	Manchester United	0	(0)
2020–2021	→ Salford City (loan)	30	(2)
2021–2022	→ Hull City (loan)	26	(0)
2023	→ Portsmouth (loan)	10	(0)
2023–	Sheffield Wednesday	64	(3)

International career^{‡}
2023–	Jamaica	19	(1)
Medal record
Men's football
Representing Jamaica
CONCACAF Nations League
Bronze medal – third place	2024 United States	Team
- * Club domestic league appearances and goals as of 21:57, 20 November 2026 (UTC) ‡ National team caps and goals as of 23:31, 18 November 2024 (UTC)

Di'Shon Joel Bernard (born 14 October 2000) is a professional footballer who plays as a centre-back for EFL League One club Sheffield Wednesday. Born in England, he plays for the Jamaica national team.

Bernard joined the Manchester United youth system in 2017. He made his professional debut for the club in a UEFA Europa League game against Astana in November 2019. He has also spent time on loan at Salford City, where he made 31 appearances in the 2020–21 season, and Hull City.

== Club career ==
=== Manchester United ===
Bernard joined the Manchester United academy at the age of 16 in 2017, having previously progressed through Chelsea's youth system. He made his senior debut in a Europa League match against Astana on 28 November 2019, however he scored an own goal as United lost 2–1.

On 12 June 2023, it was announced that Bernard will be leaving Manchester United when his contract expires on 30 June.

==== Loans ====
Bernard moved on loan to League Two club Salford City on 16 October 2020. His Salford debut came on 24 October, being brought on in the 61st minute as a substitute for Oscar Threlkeld in a 1–1 draw with Crawley Town. He scored his first goal for the club on 2 December, scoring a header in stoppage time in a 2–1 loss to Carlisle United. On 15 January 2021, the loan was extended to the end of the season. Bernard would say that going out on loan to Salford was vital to his development as a player, and was hoping that by doing so he could follow in the footsteps of Axel Tuanzebe, who became a first-team regular after several loan spells. He was cup-tied for Salford's victory in the 2020 EFL Trophy Final which was played in March 2021.

On 30 July 2021, Bernard signed a season-long loan deal with Championship club Hull City. He made his debut on 10 August 2021, in an EFL Cup first round match against Wigan Athletic which went to penalties after a 1–1 draw.

On 31 January 2023, Bernard joined League One club Portsmouth on loan until the end of the 2022–23 season.

=== Sheffield Wednesday ===
On 31 July 2023, Bernard signed for Championship club Sheffield Wednesday. Bernard made his Sheffield Wednesday debut in the EFL Cup against Stockport County and his first league start later that month against Cardiff City. Following the end of the 2023–24 season, the club had offered Bernard a new contract.

He signed a new contract to stay at the club on 18 July 2024. He scored his maiden Owls goal against Blackpool on 17 September 2024 in the EFL Cup. His first Championship goal came against Cardiff City in November 2024. In February 2025, he injured his knee against West Bromwich Albion, with manager Danny Röhl confirming he would require surgery and miss the rest of the season out injured. The injury saw him miss the entirety of the 2025–26 season which saw Sheffield Wednesday relegated to League One.

He made his long-awaited return on 22 September 2026, starting the EFL Trophy game against Salford City, playing an hour. In November, he scored his first goal since his injury against Plymouth Argyle, carrying the ball from deep and crashing a shot off the post to make it 3–0.

== International career ==
Born in England, Bernard is Jamaican by descent. He debuted for the Jamaica national team in a 2–1 friendly loss to Qatar on 15 June 2023. Soon after his debut, he was named to the final 23-man squad for the 2023 CONCACAF Gold Cup.

== Career statistics ==
=== Club ===
As of 20 November 2026

Appearances and goals by club, season and competition
Club	Season	League			FA Cup		EFL Cup		Europe		Other		Total	
Club	Season	Division	Apps	Goals	Apps	Goals	Apps	Goals	Apps	Goals	Apps	Goals	Apps	Goals
Manchester United U21	2019–20	—	—		—		—		—		4 (Note: Appearance(s) in EFL Trophy)	0	4	0
Manchester United U21	2020–21	—	—		—		—		—		2	0	2	0
Manchester United U21	2022–23	—	—		—		—		—		1	0	1	0
Manchester United U21	Total		—		—		—		—		7	0	7	0
Manchester United	2019–20	Premier League	0	0	0	0	0	0	1 (Note: Appearance in UEFA Europa League)	0	—		1	0
Manchester United	2020–21	Premier League	0	0	0	0	0	0	0	0	—		0	0
Manchester United	2021–22	Premier League	0	0	0	0	0	0	0	0	—		0	0
Manchester United	2022–23	Premier League	0	0	0	0	0	0	0	0	—		0	0
Manchester United	Total		0	0	0	0	0	0	1	0	—		1	0
Salford City (loan)	2020–21	League Two	30	2	1	0	0	0	—		—		31	2
Hull City (loan)	2021–22	Championship	26	0	1	0	1	0	—		—		28	0
Portsmouth (loan)	2022–23	League One	10	0	—		—		—		—		10	0
Sheffield Wednesday	2023–24	Championship	32	0	3	0	1	0	—		—		36	0
Sheffield Wednesday	2024–25	Championship	27	2	1	0	3	1	—		—		31	3
Sheffield Wednesday	2025–26	Championship	0	0	0	0	0	0	—		—		0	0
Sheffield Wednesday	2026–27	League One	5	1	1	0	0	0	—		1	0	7	1
Sheffield Wednesday	Total		64	3	5	0	4	1	0	0	1	0	74	4
Career total			129	5	7	0	5	1	1	0	8	0	150	6

=== International ===
As of match played 18 November 2024

National team	Year	Apps	Goals
Jamaica	2023	11	1
Jamaica	2024	8	0
Total		19	1

Scores and results list Jamaica's goal tally first, score column indicates score after each Bernard goal.

List of international goals scored by Di'Shon Bernard
No.	Date	Venue	Opponent	Score	Result	Competition
1	2 July 2023	Levi's Stadium, Santa Clara, United States	Saint Kitts and Nevis	3–0	5–0	2023 CONCACAF Gold Cup
