= Redditch United F.C. =

Association football club in Redditch, England

Redditch United
- Full name: Redditch United Football Club
- Nickname: The Reds
- Founded: 1891; 135 years ago (as Redditch Town)
- Ground: Valley Stadium, Redditch
- Capacity: 5,000 (250 seating)
- Coordinates: 52.3078°N 1.9516°W
- Chairman: David Faulkner
- Manager: Jimmy Fry
- League: Southern League Premier Division Central
- 2025–26: Southern League Premier Division Central, 7th of 22
- Website: redditchunited.co.uk
Home colours	Away colours	Third colours

Redditch United Football Club is an English football club based in Redditch, Worcestershire. The club participates in the Southern League Premier Division Central and play their home games at the Valley Stadium.

== History ==
They were originally called Redditch and joined the Birmingham and District League in 1921. After the war, they played in the Birmingham Combination, and were champions in 1953, before returning to the Birmingham and District.

In 1971, they changed their name to Redditch United and the following season joined the Southern League. In 1975–76, they won Division One North and were promoted to the Premier Division. In 1978–79, they finished eighth in the league, and became founder members of the Alliance Premier League. However, they finished bottom in their first season, and dropped into the Southern League's Midland Division.

After finishing as runners-up in 1985–86, the club were promoted to the Premier Division, where they remained until relegation in 1989. The following season, they reached the first round of the FA Cup, losing 3–1 to Merthyr Tydfil. In 2003–04, the club won the Southern League Western Division, and then joined Conference North.

On 17 March 2011, businessman Chris Swan took over the club, after a previous attempt to purchase Kidderminster Harriers fell through. A short time later, in May 2011, the club was relegated from the Conference North after finishing bottom of the division.

Redditch United returned to the Southern Premier Division for the 2011-12 season following their relegation the previous season. At the end of the 2015-16 season, the club finished second in the division under the management of Liam McDonald, but were denied promotion after losing in the play-off semi-finals to Leamington on penalty kicks.

== Players ==
=== Current squad ===
As of 8 September 2026

Note: Flags indicate national team as defined under FIFA eligibility rules; some limited exceptions apply. Players may hold more than one non-FIFA nationality.

Pos.	Nation	Player
GK	NIR	Rory Brown
GK	ENG	Joe Neeson
DF	ENG	Alex Foreshaw
DF	ENG	Will Grewal-Pollard
DF	ENG	Kynan Murchison
DF	ENG	Morgan Owen
DF	ENG	Joel Shambrook
DF	ENG	Jenson Sumnall
MF	ENG	Robbie Bunn (captain)
MF	ENG	Shan Fernando

Pos.	Nation	Player
MF	ENG	Billy Fielding
MF	ENG	Charlie Knowles
MF	ENG	Liam Loughlan
MF	ENG	Aram Soleman
FW	ENG	Aaron Bishop
FW	ENG	Omari Brown
FW	ENG	Tyler Bruck
FW	ENG	Alex Cameron
FW	ENG	Danny King
FW	ENG	Dan Sweeney

The Southern Football League does not use a squad numbering system.

== Management and coaching staff ==
=== Current staff ===
As of 8 September 2026

Position	Name
Manager	(England) Jimmy Fry
Assistant Manager	(England) Charlie Tonks
Head of Recruitment	(England) Ben Faulkner
Goalkeeper Coach	(England) Dan Hollings
Sports Therapist	(England) Chloe Allen

== Records ==
=== Redditch FC ===
- Best FA Cup performance: 1st round replay, 1960–61

=== Redditch United FC ===
- Best FA Cup performance: 1st round, 1971–72 (replay)
- Best FA Trophy performance: 4th round, 1998–99

== Honours ==
- Birmingham Combination
  - Champions: 1913–14, 1932–33, 1952–53
- Birmingham & District League
  - Southern Division champions: 1954–55
- Southern League
  - Division One North champions: 1975–76
  - Western Division champions: 2003–04
- Birmingham Senior Cup
  - Winners: 1925, 1932, 1939, 1977, 2005,
- Worcestershire Senior Cup
  - Winners: 1894, 1930, 1975, 1976, 2008, 2014
- Staffordshire Senior Cup
  - Winners: 1991
- Worcester Royal Infirmary Cup
  - Winners: 1999

== See also ==
- Redditch United F.C. players
- Redditch United F.C. managers
