= Hayden Campbell =

English footballer

Personal information
- Full name: Hayden Matthew Campbell
- Date of birth: 3 June 2002 (age 24)
- Place of birth: Stafford, England
- Height: 5 ft 10 in (1.79 m)
- Position: Midfielder

Team information
- Current team: Leek Town

Youth career
- 2009–2019: Port Vale

Senior career*
Years	Team	Apps	(Gls)
2019–2020	Port Vale	0	(0)
2019–2020	→ Kidsgrove Athletic (loan)		
2020–2022	Salford City	0	(0)
2020	→ Marine (loan)	1	(0)
2021	→ FC United of Manchester (loan)	6	(0)
2021–2022	→ Stalybridge Celtic (loan)	3	(1)
2022	→ Altrincham (loan)	3	(0)
2022–2023	Marine	19	(10)
2023	Curzon Ashton	18	(7)
2023	Macclesfield	3	(1)
2023–2024	Curzon Ashton	25	(2)
2024	Rushall Olympic	7	(0)
2024–	Leek Town (Note: Statistics for the 2025–26 season not known.)		
- * Club domestic league appearances and goals as of 11:20, 26 April 2026 (UTC)

Hayden Matthew Campbell (born 3 June 2002) is an English semi-professional footballer who plays as a midfielder for Northern Premier League Premier Division club Leek Town.

Campbell began his career at Port Vale before joining Salford City in September 2020. From Salford he was loaned out to Kidsgrove Athletic, Marine, FC United of Manchester, Stalybridge Celtic and Altrincham, before he joined Marine permanently in August 2022. He signed for Curzon Ashton in January 2023 and rejoined the club later in the year following a brief spell with Macclesfield. He later played for Rushall Olympic and Leek Town.

== Career ==
=== Port Vale ===
Campbell began his career at Port Vale, moving on loan to Northern Premier League Division One South East club Kidsgrove Athletic on 18 December 2019.

=== Salford City ===
He signed for Salford City on 23 September 2020. He made his senior debut for the "Ammies" on 10 November, coming on as a 59th-minute substitute for Oscar Threlkeld in a 2–1 victory at Rochdale in the group stages of the EFL Trophy. He moved on loan to Marine in December 2020, making two appearances in all competitions for them.

He moved on loan to Northern Premier League Premier Division club FC United of Manchester in September 2021, and in November was loaned to Stalybridge Celtic. He made his debut against Bootle in the FA Trophy, scoring the opening goal of a 3–3 draw, following which Stalybridge won a penalty shoot-out.

On 25 March 2022, Campbell joined National League side Altrincham on loan for the remainder of the 2021–22 season. He made three substitute appearances for the club, featuring for a total of 54 minutes. Salford released him at the end of the 2021–22 season.

=== Non-League ===
On 11 August 2022, Campbell signed for Marine, now in the Northern Premier League Premier Division. He scored 11 goals from 25 games in the first half of the 2022–23 campaign, including a hat-trick in a 4–0 win over Atherton Collieries at Rossett Park on 27 September. On 13 January 2023, he joined National League North side Curzon Ashton following a seven-day notice of approach. He scored seven goals in 18 games in the second half of the 2022–23 season.

He joined Northern Premier League Premier Division club Macclesfield in May 2023, before returning to Curzon Ashton in October of the same year. He played 25 league games in the 2023–24 season. Curzon secured a play-off place; they were eliminated by Chorley after a penalty shoot-out in the quarter-finals, with Campbell missing one of the penalties.

In June 2024, Campbell signed for fellow National League North side Rushall Olympic. In October 2024, he joined Northern Premier League Premier Division side Leek Town. He scored 12 goals in 34 games throughout the 2024–25 season. At the end of the 2025–26 campaign, he scored the final goal in the history of Borough Park as Leek recorded a 1–0 victory at Workington.

== Style of play ==
Campbell is a ball-playing central midfielder who has good passing and distribution skills.

== Personal life ==
His father, Warren Campbell, played non-League football for Leek Town.

== Career statistics ==
As of end of the 2025–26 season

Appearances and goals by club, season and competition
Club	Season	League			FA Cup		Other		Total	
Club	Season	Division	Apps	Goals	Apps	Goals	Apps	Goals	Apps	Goals
Port Vale	2019–20	League Two	0	0	0	0	0	0	0	0
Salford City	2019–20	League Two	0	0	0	0	2 (Note: Appearance(s) in the EFL Trophy.)	0	2	0
Salford City	2020–21	League Two	0	0	0	0	1	0	1	0
Salford City	Total		0	0	0	0	3	0	3	0
Marine (loan)	2020–21	NPL Division One North West	1	0	0	0	1 (Note: Appearance in the FA Trophy.)	0	2	0
FC United of Manchester (loan)	2021–22	NPL Premier Division	6	0	0	0	0	0	6	0
Stalybridge Celtic (loan)	2021–22	NPL Premier Division	3	1	0	0	2	1	5	2
Altrincham (loan)	2021–22	National League	3	0	0	0	0	0	3	0
Marine	2022–23	NPL Premier Division	19	10	2	1	4 (Note: Three appearances in the FA Trophy and one appearance in the Liverpool Senior Cup.)	0	25	11
Curzon Ashton	2022–23	National League North	18	7	0	0	0	0	18	7
Macclesfield	2023–24	NPL Premier Division	3	1	2	0	1	1	6	2
Curzon Ashton	2023–24	National League North	25	2	0	0	1 (Note: Appearance(s) in the play-offs.)	0	26	2
Rushall Olympic	2024–25	National League North	7	0	2	0	0	0	9	0
Leek Town	2024–25	NPL Premier Division	31	9	0	0	3 (Note: Appearance(s) in the Staffordshire Senior Cup.)	3	34	12
Leek Town	2025–26	NPL Premier Division								
Leek Town	2026–27	NPL Premier Division	0	0	0	0	0	0	0	0
