= Václav Hladký =

Czech footballer (born 1990)

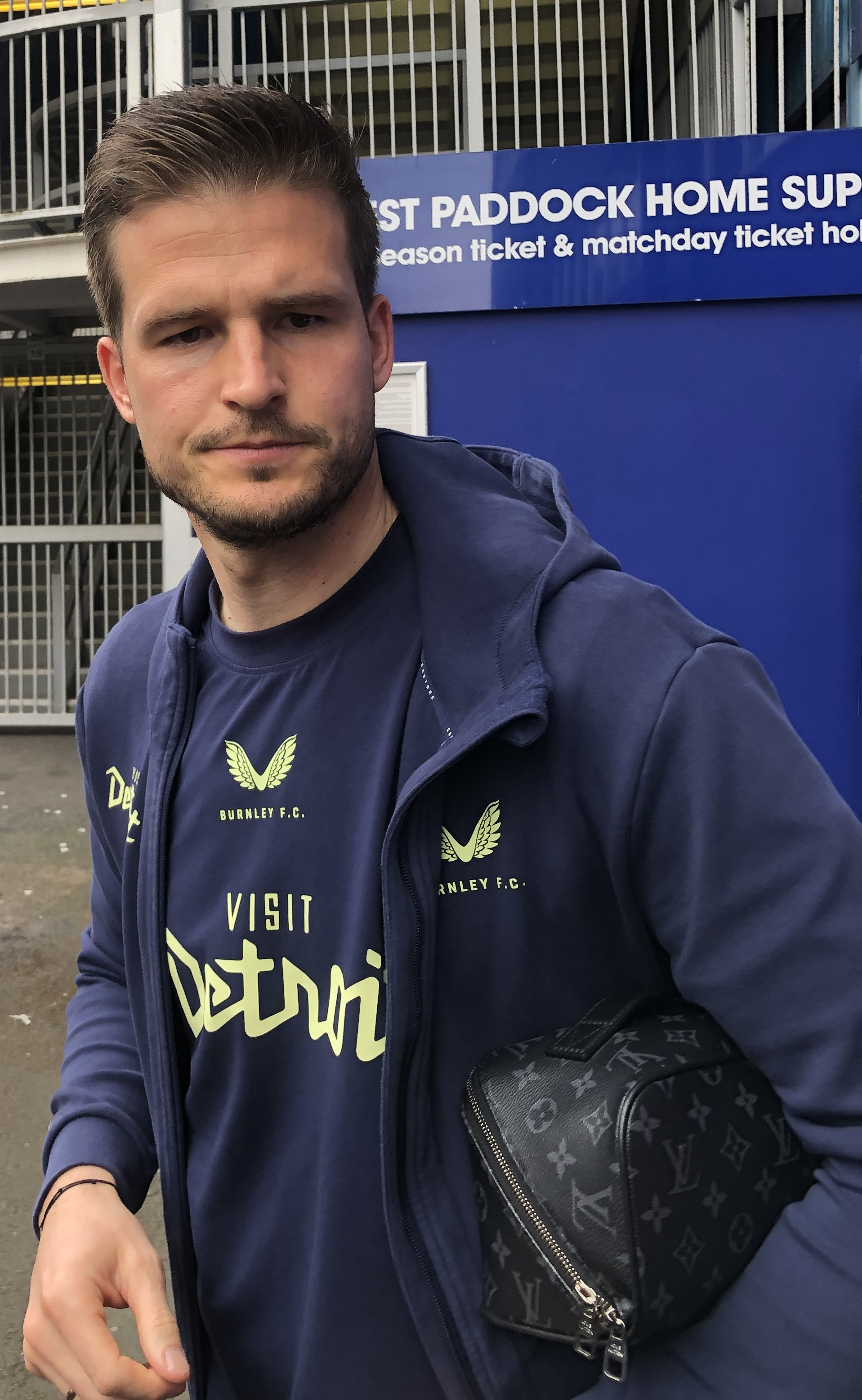
- Hladký in 2025

Personal information
- Date of birth: 14 November 1990 (age 35)
- Place of birth: Brno, Czechoslovakia
- Height: 1.92 m (6 ft 4 in)
- Position: Goalkeeper

Youth career
- 1996–2003: FC Sparta Brno
- 2003–2004: FK Šardice
- 2004–2009: Zbrojovka Brno

Senior career*
Years	Team	Apps	(Gls)
2006–2011	Zbrojovka Brno B	45	(0)
2009	→ Břeclav (loan)	15	(0)
2010	→ Břeclav (loan)	9	(0)
2011	→ Sparta Brno (loan)	1	(0)
2011–2015	Zbrojovka Brno	42	(0)
2015–2019	Slovan Liberec	31	(0)
2019–2020	St Mirren	47	(0)
2020–2021	Salford City	46	(0)
2021–2024	Ipswich Town	59	(0)
2024–2026	Burnley	1	(0)
Total		295	(0)

International career
2005–2006	Czech Republic U16	8	(0)
2006–2007	Czech Republic U17	7	(0)
2007–2008	Czech Republic U18	7	(0)
2008–2009	Czech Republic U19	7	(0)
2011	Czech Republic U20	1	(0)
- * Club domestic league appearances and goals as of 23:13, 18 August 2024 (UTC)

Václav Hladký (born 14 November 1990) is a Czech former professional footballer who last played as a goalkeeper for EFL Championship side Burnley. He has previously played for Zbrojovka Brno and Slovan Liberec in his homeland, St Mirren in Scotland, Salford City and Ipswich Town in England. He has represented his country at youth level up to under-20.

== Career ==
=== Zbrojovka Brno ===
Having signed in 2012, he spent his first year as second choice goalkeeper behind Radek Petr, but was made first choice in 2013. He made his début on the opening day of 2013–14 season against FK Jablonec, managing to keep a clean sheet. During his time at the club, Brno goalkeeping coach Luboš Přibyl compared him to fellow Czech goalkeeper Petr Čech. On 18 October 2014, he was sent off against Sparta Prague. During the 2014–15 season he was dropped from the team after a series of mistakes, and by the end of the season declared he wanted to leave the club having fallen behind Dušan Melichárek as the club's number one.

=== Slovan Liberec ===
After signing in 2015, Hladký was second choice goalkeeper for over two years, initially behind Tomáš Koubek, signed on loan from Sparta Prague at the same time. He was selected for four league games in the autumn and was praised for his performances, which including keeping a clean sheet against Sparta Prague, and against Fastav Zlín in the Czech Cup.

He would remain backup, initially behind Martin Dúbravka, and then behind Ondřej Kolář, before getting his opportunity in the spring of 2018. He would be dropped the following season for Filip Nguyen, signed from second division Vlašim.

=== St Mirren ===
After falling back down the pecking order at Slovan Liberec, Hladký signed for St Mirren on an 18-month deal in January 2019. He quickly became a fan favourite at St Mirren Park, with goalkeeping coach Jamie Langfield saying he could be the player to keep St Mirren in the Scottish Premiership. He made the BBC's Scottish Premiership team of the week following his performance in a 1–1 draw with Heart of Midlothian.

On 26 May, St Mirren played out a 1–1 in the play-off final against Dundee United, meaning the two teams would play a penalty shootout; Hladký saved three of the four penalties he faced as St Mirren won the shootout 2–0 and therefore staying in the Premiership. Hladký dedicated the victory to his best friend Josef Šural, who died in a bus crash a month prior, and credited Langfield, St Mirren manager Oran Kearney and chief executive Tony Fitzpatrick for supporting him during the difficult moments.

In the summer, St Mirren rejected a £200k offer from Qarabağ, with new manager Jim Goodwin declaring him the best goalkeeper in the league. In June 2020, Hladký left Saints when he rejected the offer of a new contract.

=== Salford City ===
In August 2020 he joined EFL League Two side Salford City on a two-year contract. On his competitive début, an EFL Cup first round match against Rotherham United, he saved a penalty from Joe Mattock to send Salford through 4–2 after a shoot-out. In the delayed 2020 EFL Trophy Final played on 13 March 2021, Hladky saved the decisive penalty from Ronan Curtis to help Salford win 4–2 on penalties, having drawn 0–0 in normal time against Portsmouth.

Hladky was awarded the League Two Golden Glove award; he kept 22 clean sheets throughout the season, the most in the division, and he was named in the League Two Team of the Year by the Professional Footballers' Association as well as the EFL's League Two Team of the Season. Hladky's performances also saw him voted Salford's player of the season by the clubs' supporters, while Sky Sports named him in their team of the year for conceding 34 goals and saving 77.2% of shots faced, both league highs.

=== Ipswich Town ===
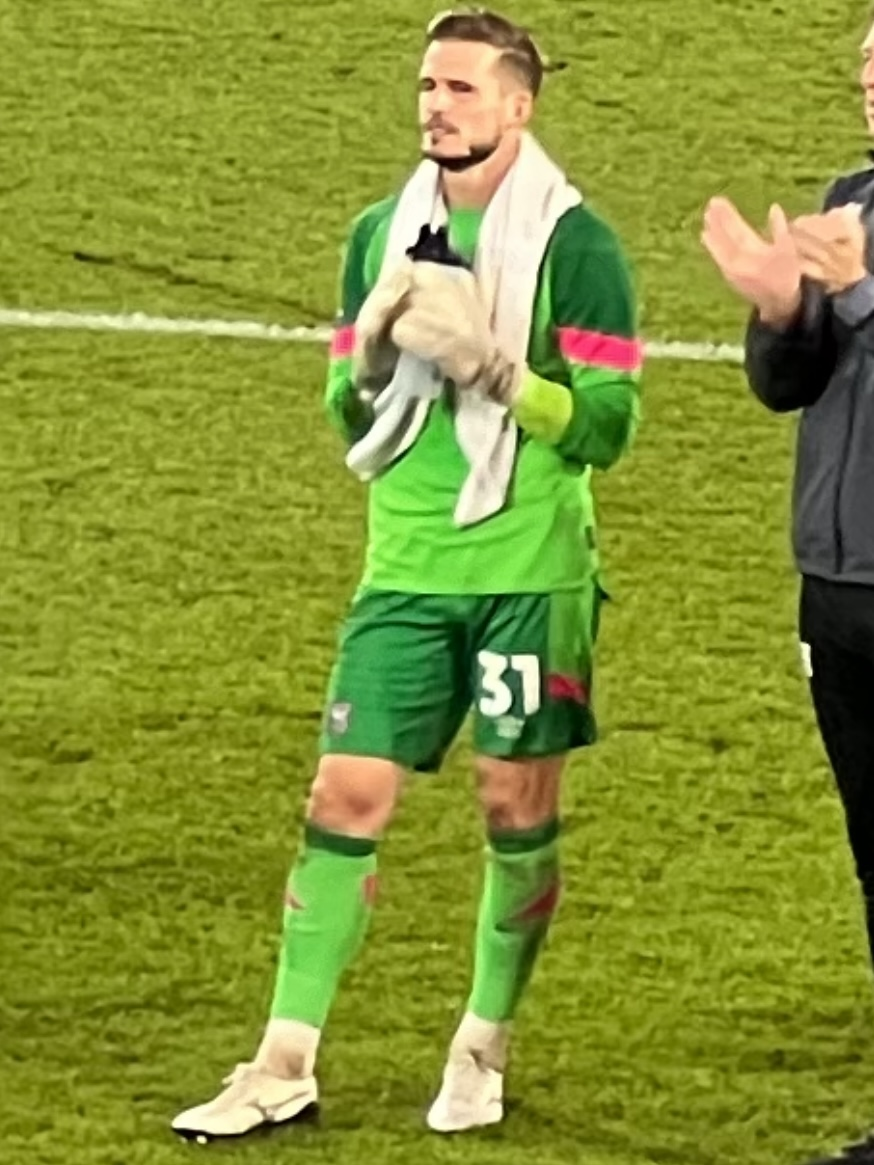
Hladký with Ipswich Town in 2023.

After just one season with Salford, Hladky was signed by Ipswich Town, signing a three-year contract.

After a disappointing start Hladky was replaced as first choice by Christian Walton. He remained the back-up until an injury in to Walton during pre-season gave him his chance as first choice for the 2023–24 season. A string of impressive performance meant that he kept Walton out of the team when he returned from injury, going on to play in all 46 of Ipswich's league games as the club clinched promotion to the Premier League.

On 3 June 2024, Ipswich said it had offered Hladky a new contract, but on 1 July it was announced that he had left the club after three years.

=== Burnley ===
On 19 July 2024, it was announced that Hladký has signed for Championship club Burnley on a two-year contract. On 10 June 2026 the club announced he was being released.

== Career statistics ==
As of match played 1 March 2025

Appearances and goals by club, season and competition
Club	Season	League			National cup (Note: Includes Czech Cup, Scottish Cup, FA Cup)		League cup (Note: Includes Scottish League Cup, EFL Cup)		Europe		Other		Total	
Club	Season	Division	Apps	Goals	Apps	Goals	Apps	Goals	Apps	Goals	Apps	Goals	Apps	Goals
Zbrojovka Brno	2012–13	Czech First League	1	0	0	0	—		—		—		1	0
Zbrojovka Brno	2013–14	Czech First League	25	0	4	0	—		—		—		29	0
Zbrojovka Brno	2014–15	Czech First League	16	0	0	0	—		—		—		16	0
Zbrojovka Brno	Total		42	0	4	0	—		—		—		46	0
Slovan Liberec	2015–16	Czech First League	5	0	5	0	—		0	0	0	0	10	0
Slovan Liberec	2016–17	Czech First League	2	0	3	0	—		1 (Note: Appearance in UEFA Europa League)	0	—		6	0
Slovan Liberec	2017–18	Czech First League	15	0	1	0	—		—		—		16	0
Slovan Liberec	2018–19	Czech First League	9	0	0	0	—		—		—		9	0
Slovan Liberec	Total		31	0	9	0	—		1	0	0	0	41	0
St Mirren	2018–19	Scottish Premiership	17	0	2	0	0	0	—		2 (Note: Appearances in the Scottish Premiership play-offs)	0	21	0
St Mirren	2019–20	Scottish Premiership	30	0	4	0	4	0	—		—		38	0
St Mirren	Total		47	0	6	0	4	0	—		2	0	59	0
Salford City	2020–21	League Two	46	0	2	0	2	0	—		3 (Note: Appearances in EFL Trophy) (Note: Includes appearance in the 2019–20 EFL Trophy final which was postponed until 13 March 2021 due to the COVID-19 pandemic.)	0	53	0
Ipswich Town	2021–22	League One	12	0	0	0	0	0	—		2	0	14	0
Ipswich Town	2022–23	League One	1	0	4	0	1	0	—		4	0	10	0
Ipswich Town	2023–24	Championship	46	0	0	0	1	0	—		—		47	0
Ipswich Town	Total		59	0	4	0	2	0	—		6	0	71	0
Burnley	2024–25	Championship	1	0	3	0	1	0	—		—		5	0
Burnley	2025–26	Premier League	0	0	0	0	0	0	—		—		0	0
Burnley	Total		1	0	3	0	1	0	—		—		5	0
Career total			226	0	28	0	9	0	1	0	11	0	275	0

== Honours ==
Salford City

- EFL Trophy: 2019–20

Ipswich Town

- EFL League One runner-up: 2022–23
- EFL Championship runner-up: 2023–24

Individual

- EFL League Two Golden Glove: 2020–21
- EFL League Two Team of the Season: 2020–21
- PFA Team of the Year: 2020–21 League Two
- Salford City Player of the Season: 2020–21
