= Tylor Golden =

English footballer (born 1999)

Personal information
- Full name: Tylor Reed Golden
- Date of birth: 8 November 1999 (age 27)
- Place of birth: Ipswich, England
- Height: 1.74 m (5 ft 9 in)
- Position: Defender

Team information
- Current team: Altrincham
- Number: 23

Youth career
- 2014–2017: Wigan Athletic

Senior career*
Years	Team	Apps	(Gls)
2017–2020	Wigan Athletic	0	(0)
2019	→ Droylsden (loan)	4	(0)
2019–2020	→ Nantwich Town (loan)		
2020–2022	Salford City	9	(0)
2021	→ Notts County (loan)	0	(0)
2022–2024	FC Halifax Town	78	(3)
2024–	Altrincham	87	(7)
- * Club domestic league appearances and goals as of 22:51, 18 August 2024 (UTC)

Tylor Golden (born 8 November 1999) is an English professional footballer who plays as a defender for Altrincham.

== Club career ==
=== Early career and Wigan Athletic ===
Born in Ipswich, Suffolk to parents Tony and Tania, Golden moved to Myrtle Beach, South Carolina, United States in 2000. Golden moved back to Ipswich, England in 2008 and spent a year with Ipswich Town alongside his brother Deven. After spells with Manchester City, Rochdale and Blackburn Rovers, Golden joined Wigan Athletic in 2014, and was included as a substitute for the senior team for the first time for a match against Scunthorpe United in October 2017. He made his first-team debut during their EFL Trophy tie against Middlesbrough U23s later in the month, setting up a goal for mentor Noel Hunt in a 4–1 victory. Golden signed his first professional contract in April 2018. In 2019, he had spells on loan at Droylsden, where he made four appearances, and Nantwich Town before being released by Wigan at the end of June 2020.

=== Salford City ===
On 31 August 2020, it was announced that Golden had joined the development squad of League Two side Salford City. He made his competitive début for the club on 9 September in an EFL Trophy game against Manchester United Under-21s. Golden made his Football League début on 26 September, playing the whole match and helping to keep a clean sheet in a 0–0 draw against Forest Green Rovers, and he received praise from manager Graham Alexander for his "flawless" performance.

On 22 February 2021, Golden joined National League side Notts County on a one-month loan deal. He made only one appearance for County, against Oxford City in the FA Trophy, where he scored an own-goal and was criticised for his performance by County fans. During the match, Golden suffered an injury and eventually returned to Salford at the end of April without playing another match.

He was released by Salford at the end of the 2021–22 season.

=== FC Halifax Town ===
In July 2022 he signed for FC Halifax Town.

== Style of play ==
Former Salford manager Graham Alexander has described him as a player who sticks to his defensive tasks but who enjoys going forward and being directly involved in the game, as well as showing the "right enthusiasm and attitude towards the game". Neal Ardley, his manager at Notts County, said he was a player who would "run up and down that line as much as he physically can" and that he is "physically robust, puts himself about and defends for his life".

== Career statistics ==
As of match played 16 March 2024

Appearances and goals by club, season and competition
Club	Season	League			FA Cup		EFL Cup		Other		Total	
Club	Season	Division	Apps	Goals	Apps	Goals	Apps	Goals	Apps	Goals	Apps	Goals
Wigan Athletic	2017–18	League One	0	0	0	0	0	0	2 (Note: Appearances in EFL Trophy)	0	2	0
Wigan Athletic	2018–19	Championship	0	0	0	0	0	0	—		0	0
Wigan Athletic	2019–20	Championship	0	0	0	0	0	0	—		0	0
Wigan Athletic	Total		0	0	0	0	0	0	2	0	2	0
Droylsden (loan)	2018–19	Northern Premier League Division One West	4	0	0	0	—		—		4	0
Nantwich Town (loan)	2019–20	Northern Premier League Premier Division	No data									
Salford City	2020–21	League Two	7	0	1	0	0	0	4	0	12	0
Salford City	2021–22	League Two	2	0	0	0	1	0	3	0	6	0
Salford City	Total		9	0	1	0	1	0	10	0	21	0
Notts County (loan)	2020–21	National League	0	0	0	0	—		1 (Note: Appearance(s) in FA Trophy)	0	1	0
Halifax Town	2022–23	National League	36	2	2	0	—		6	0	44	2
Halifax Town	2023–24	National League	34	1	1	0	—		1	0	36	1
Halifax Town	Total		70	3	3	0	—		7	0	80	3
Career total			83	3	4	0	1	0	19	0	107	3

== Honours ==
Halifax Town

- FA Trophy: 2022–23
