= Brandon Thomas-Asante =

Ghanaian association football player

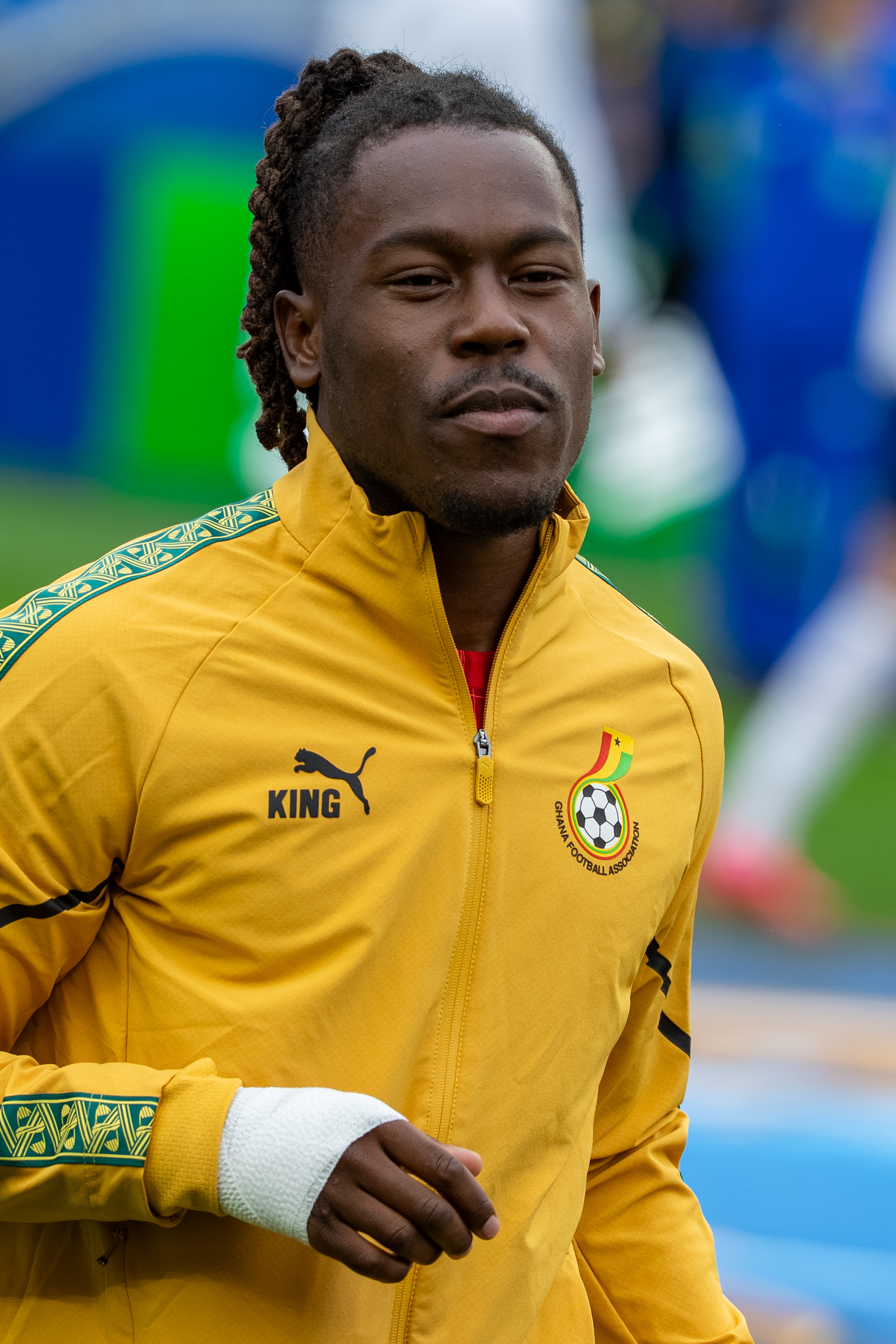
- Thomas-Asante with Ghana in 2026

Personal information
- Full name: Solomon Brandon Michael Clarke Thomas-Asante
- Date of birth: 29 December 1998 (age 27)
- Place of birth: Milton Keynes, England
- Height: 1.80 m (5 ft 11 in)
- Position: Forward

Team information
- Current team: Coventry City
- Number: 23

Youth career
- 2011–2016: Milton Keynes Dons

Senior career*
Years	Team	Apps	(Gls)
2016–2019	Milton Keynes Dons	22	(0)
2018–2019	→ Sutton United (loan)	8	(0)
2019	→ Oxford City (loan)	15	(3)
2019	Ebbsfleet United	3	(0)
2019–2022	Salford City	107	(26)
2022–2024	West Bromwich Albion	72	(18)
2024–	Coventry City	79	(17)

International career^{‡}
2024–	Ghana	12	(1)
- * Club domestic league appearances and goals as of 22:20, 21 August 2026 (UTC) ‡ National team caps and goals as of 29 September 2026 (UTC)

Solomon Brandon Michael Clarke Thomas-Asante (born 29 December 1998) is a professional footballer who plays as a centre forward for Premier League club Coventry City. Born in England, he plays for the Ghana national team.

Thomas-Asante began his career with Milton Keynes Dons, where he made his professional debut aged in 2016 aged 17. After spells on loan with Sutton United and Oxford City, he left Milton Keynes in 2019, spending a short spell at Ebbsfleet United before signing for Salford City. While at Salford, he won his first trophy, the 2019–20 EFL Trophy.

== Club career ==
=== Milton Keynes Dons ===
Thomas-Asante joined Milton Keynes Dons' academy at the age of 12, progressing through various age groups and into the club's development squad. On 6 August 2016, following an impressive pre-season, he made his debut for the first team, featuring as a substitute in the 75th minute in a 1–0 away win to Shrewsbury Town. On 12 September, Thomas-Asante signed professional terms with the club, signing a one-year deal with an option of a further year. On 5 November, he scored his first professional goal for the club, scoring in a 3–2 home FA Cup first round win over Spennymoor Town. On 2 May 2017, following an impressive first season as a professional, Thomas-Asante was awarded the club's Academy Player of the Year for 2016–17. On 14 June, Thomas-Asante's contract was extended until summer 2018, and on 26 January 2018 was extended a further year until the summer of 2019.

==== Loans, departure, spell with Ebbsfleet United ====
After a brief loan spell with National League club Sutton United, Thomas-Asante joined National League South club Oxford City in late January 2019 until the end of the season, eventually going on to make 15 appearances and scoring three goals. Following limited first team opportunities during the 2018–19 season, Thomas-Asante confirmed on 11 May he would be leaving Milton Keynes following the expiry of his contract in June.

After a spell on trial with Swindon Town, Thomas-Asante signed for National League club Ebbsfleet United on 9 August 2019.

=== Salford City ===
He then signed for Salford City making his debut for the club on 3 September 2019 in a EFL Trophy match against Aston Villa Under 21's. He made his league debut for the club as a substitute on 14 September. His first goal for the club came on Boxing Day, scoring Salford's second in the 12th minute of a 3–1 victory against Crewe Alexandra. He finished the 2019–20 campaign with six goals from 26 appearances in all competitions.

On 28 November 2020, Thomas-Asante received the first red-card of his career for a reckless foul on Newport County goalkeeper Tom King, as Salford exited the FA Cup at the second round. He scored his first goal of the season against Leicester City U23s in the EFL Trophy group match that ended in a 3–3 draw after 90 minutes, eventually losing 9–8 on penalties in which he converted his penalty. He played for Salford in the delayed 2020 EFL Trophy final at Wembley Stadium against Portsmouth. Thomas-Asante converted his penalty in the shootout as Salford won the final. On 19 March 2022, Thomas-Asante scored his first career hat-trick in a 5–1 home victory over Scunthorpe United.

=== West Bromwich Albion ===
On 31 August 2022, Thomas-Asante signed for EFL Championship club West Bromwich Albion on a three-year contract for a fee reported to be in the region of £300,000, rejecting a move to Birmingham City. On 2 September 2022, Thomas-Asante made his debut and scored his first goal, a 98th-minute equaliser for West Brom in a 1–1 home draw against Burnley. Thomas-Asante finished his first West Brom season as the club's top goalscorer of the season with 9 goals, 7 of which in the league. His volley against Stoke City in November was voted as West Brom's 2022–23 goal of the season.

=== Coventry City ===
On 1 August 2024, Thomas-Asante signed for Championship club Coventry City on a four-year contract for an undisclosed fee. On 3 August, he made his debut in a pre-season friendly against SV Werder Bremen who compete in the Bundesliga. On 27 August, Thomas-Asante scored his first goal for Coventry City in a 1–0 win against Oxford United in the second round of the EFL Cup. On 1 October, Thomas-Asante scored his first league goal for Coventry City in a 3–0 win against Blackburn Rovers.

In the following season, Thomas-Asante was named EFL Championship Player of the Month for October 2025 having scored six goals in as many matches as Coventry topped the league. In total, he scored 13 goals across 32 games in a season which saw Frank Lampard's Sky Blues top the Championship and win promotion to the Premier League for the first time in their history.

== International career ==
In December 2023, Thomas-Asante was pre-called up by the Ghana national football team for the 2023 Africa Cup of Nations.

He made his debut for the Ghana national team on 10 June 2024 in a World Cup qualifier against the Central African Republic at the Baba Yara Stadium. He substituted Mohammed Kudus in the 89th minute of a 4–3 Ghana victory. He scored his first goal for Ghana during a 2–1 defeat against Nigeria during the 2025 Unity Cup on 28 May 2025.

On 2 June 2026, Thomas-Asante was named in head coach Carlos Queiroz's 26-man squad for the 2026 FIFA World Cup. He made two appearances at the tournament, coming on as a substitute in group stage games against Panama and Croatia.

== Personal life ==
Brandon Thomas-Asante was born on 27 December 1998, in Milton Keynes, England, to a Ghanaian father and a Jamaican mother. As a youth, Thomas-Asante was a keen street dancer.

== Career statistics ==
=== Club ===
As of match played 21 November 2026

Appearances and goals by club, season and competition
Club	Season	League			FA Cup		League Cup		Other		Total	
Club	Season	Division	Apps	Goals	Apps	Goals	Apps	Goals	Apps	Goals	Apps	Goals
Milton Keynes Dons	2016–17	League One	6	0	1	1	2	0	3 (Note: Appearance(s) in EFL Trophy)	0	12	1
Milton Keynes Dons	2017–18	League One	15	0	1	0	1	0	4	1	21	1
Milton Keynes Dons	2018–19	League Two	1	0	0	0	0	0	1	0	2	0
Milton Keynes Dons	Total		22	0	2	1	3	0	8	1	35	2
Sutton United (loan)	2018–19	National League	8	0	—		—		2 (Note: Appearances in FA Trophy)	1	10	1
Oxford City (loan)	2018–19	National League South	15	3	—		—		0	0	15	3
Ebbsfleet United	2019–20	National League	3	0	0	0	—		0	0	3	0
Salford City	2019–20	League Two	20	6	1	0	—		5	0	26	6
Salford City	2020–21	League Two	42	5	2	0	2	0	4	1	50	6
Salford City	2021–22	League Two	39	11	1	0	0	0	3	2	43	13
Salford City	2022–23	League Two	6	4	0	0	1	1	0	0	7	5
Salford City	Total		107	26	4	0	3	1	12	3	126	30
West Bromwich Albion	2022–23	Championship	33	7	2	2	0	0	—		35	9
West Bromwich Albion	2023–24	Championship	39	11	1	0	1	1	2 (Note: Appearances in Championship play-offs)	0	43	12
West Bromwich Albion	Total		72	18	3	2	1	1	2	0	78	21
Coventry City	2024–25	Championship	36	4	2	0	3	2	2	0	43	6
Coventry City	2025–26	Championship	32	13	0	0	2	0	—		34	13
Coventry City	2026–27	Premier League	11	0	0	0	1	0	—		12	0
Coventry City	Total		79	17	2	0	5	2	2	0	89	19
Career total			306	64	11	3	12	4	26	5	356	76

=== International ===
As of match played 29 September 2026

Appearances and goals by national team and year
National team	Year	Apps	Goals
Ghana	2024	2	0
Ghana	2025	5	1
Ghana	2026	5	0
Total		12	1

Ghana score listed first, score column indicates score after each Thomas-Assante goal.

List of international goals scored by Brandon Thomas-Assante
No.	Date	Venue	Cap	Opponent	Score	Result	Competition
1	28 May 2025	Brentford Community Stadium, London, England	3	Nigeria	1–2	1–2	2025 Unity Cup

== Honours ==
Salford City

- EFL Trophy: 2019–20

Coventry City

- EFL Championship: 2025–26

Ghana

- Unity Cup third place: 2025

Individual

- Milton Keynes Dons Academy Player of the Year: 2016–17
- EFL Championship Player of the Month: October 2025
- EFL Championship Goal of the Month: November 2022
- PFA Championship Fans' Player of the Month: October 2025
- Salford City Goal of the Month: October 2021, November 2021
- West Bromwich Albion Goal of the Season: 2022–23
