= Alex Denny =

English footballer

Personal information
- Full name: Alexander James Denny
- Date of birth: 12 April 2000 (age 26)
- Place of birth: Chester, England
- Height: 6 ft 1 in (1.86 m)
- Position: Defensive midfielder

Youth career
- –2017: Everton

Senior career*
Years	Team	Apps	(Gls)
2017–2020	Everton	0	(0)
2020–2022	Salford City	9	(0)
2021	→ Morecambe (loan)	6	(0)
2022	The New Saints	10	(0)

International career^{‡}
2016–2017	England U17	10	(0)
2018	England U18	5	(0)
- * Club domestic league appearances and goals as of 18:02, 9 April 2022 (UTC) ‡ National team caps and goals as of 28 March 2018

Alexander James Denny (born 12 April 2000) is an English professional footballer who plays as a defensive midfielder. He last played for The New Saints.

== Club career ==
On 6 December 2017, Denny was named in Everton's first team squad for the Europa League match away to Apollon Limassol. A day later, he made his first-team debut, coming on as a 91st-minute substitute in a 3–0 win.

In the summer of 2020 he joined Salford City as a member of their development squad. He made his competitive debut for the club on 9 September 2020 in a EFL Trophy game against Manchester United Under-21s.

On 1 February 2021, Denny joined League Two side Morecambe on loan for the remainder of the 2020–21 season.

On 11 January 2022, Denny signed for Cymru Premier side The New Saints. He was not offered a new contract at the end of the season.

== International career ==
Denny has made numerous appearances for England U17, making his debut against Croatia U17 in September 2016. Denny also played in the 2017 under-17 European Championship for England who reached the final, he started in the semi-final and final.

Denny also featured five times for England U18s.

== Career statistics ==
=== Club ===
As of match played 18 April 2022

Appearances and goals by club, season and competition
Club	Season	League			FA Cup		League Cup		Other		Total	
Club	Season	Division	Apps	Goals	Apps	Goals	Apps	Goals	Apps	Goals	Apps	Goals
Everton	2017–18	Premier League	0	0	0	0	0	0	1 (Note: Appearance in UEFA Europa League)	0	1	0
Everton U21	2019–20	—	—		—		—		3 (Note: Appearance(s) in EFL Trophy)	0	3	0
Salford City	2020–21	League Two	9	0	0	0	0	0	3	0	12	0
Salford City	2021–22	League Two	0	0	0	0	0	0	3	0	3	0
Morecambe (loan)	2020–21	League Two	6	0	0	0	0	0	0	0	4	0
The New Saints	2021–22	Cymru Premier	10	0	2	0	0	0	0	0	12	0
Career total			23	0	2	0	0	0	10	0	35	0

== Honours ==
England U17

- UEFA European Under-17 Championship runner-up: 2017

Everton U23s

- Premier League Cup: 2018–19

The New Saints

- Cymru Premier: 2021–22
