= 2020–21 Salford City F.C. season =

Salford City
2020–21 season
- Chairman: Karen Baird
- Manager: Graham Alexander (until 12 October); Richie Wellens (between 4 November–22 March); Gary Bowyer (from 23 March)
- Stadium: Moor Lane
- League Two: 8th
- FA Cup: Second round
- EFL Cup: Second round
- EFL Trophy: Second round
- Top goalscorer: League: Ian Henderson (17 goals); All: Ian Henderson (18 goals)
Home colours	Away colours	Third colours

The 2020–21 season is Salford City's 81st season in their history and the second consecutive season in EFL League Two. Along with League Two, the club participated in the FA Cup, EFL Cup and EFL Trophy.

The season covers the period from 1 July 2020 to 30 June 2021.

== Squad statistics ==
=== Appearances and goals ===
No.	Pos	Nat	Player	Total		League 2		FA Cup		League Cup		League Trophy	
No.	Pos	Nat	Player	Apps	Goals	Apps	Goals	Apps	Goals	Apps	Goals	Apps	Goals
1	GK	(Czech Republic) CZE	Václav Hladký	53	0	46+0	0	2+0	0	2+0	0	3+0	0
2	DF	(Wales) WAL	Tom James	4	0	2+2	0	0+0	0	0+0	0	0+0	0
3	MF	(The Gambia) GAM	Ibou Touray	51	1	45+1	1	1+0	0	2+0	0	2+0	0
4	MF	(England) ENG	Jason Lowe	49	0	44+1	0	1+0	0	2+0	0	1+0	0
5	DF	(England) ENG	Ashley Eastham	45	1	38+1	1	2+0	0	2+0	0	2+0	0
6	DF	(England) ENG	Tom Clarke	35	2	27+5	2	0+1	0	1+0	0	1+0	0
7	FW	(England) ENG	Luke Armstrong	8	0	1+3	0	0+1	0	1+1	0	1+0	0
8	MF	(Republic of Ireland) IRL	Darron Gibson	7	0	4+1	0	0+0	0	1+1	0	0+0	0
9	DF	(England) ENG	Tom Elliott	19	0	3+11	0	0+0	0	0+2	0	2+1	0
10	MF	(England) ENG	Ashley Hunter	47	8	37+4	7	1+1	0	2+0	0	1+1	1
11	MF	(Portugal) POR	Bruno Andrade	27	2	8+11	0	0+2	1	1+1	0	3+1	1
12	DF	(Jamaica) JAM	Di'Shon Bernard	31	2	27+3	2	1+0	0	0+0	0	0+0	0
14	FW	(Scotland) SCO	George Boyd	13	0	2+9	0	2+0	0	0+0	0	0+0	0
15	MF	(England) ENG	Luke Burgess	19	3	7+10	3	0+0	0	0+0	0	1+1	0
16	DF	(England) ENG	Jordan Turnbull	50	1	35+7	1	2+0	0	1+1	0	4+0	0
17	MF	(Republic of Ireland) IRL	Richie Towell	27	3	16+8	3	0+0	0	1+0	0	2+0	0
18	DF	(England) ENG	Oscar Threlkeld	41	0	29+6	0	1+1	0	2+0	0	2+0	0
19	FW	(England) ENG	James Wilson	29	8	17+7	7	1+0	0	1+0	0	3+0	1
20	FW	(England) ENG	Emmanuel Dieseruvwe	20	4	1+13	0	1+1	1	0+0	0	0+4	3
21	GK	(England) ENG	Nick Hayes	1	0	0+0	0	0+0	0	0+0	0	1+0	0
23	DF	(England) ENG	Kevin Berkoe	3	0	0+0	0	1+0	0	0+0	0	2+0	0
24	MF	(England) ENG	Martin Smith	7	0	1+3	0	0+0	0	0+0	0	3+0	0
24	MF	(England) ENG	Robbie Gotts	23	3	20+3	3	0+0	0	0+0	0	0+0	0
25	MF	(Northern Ireland) NIR	Joey Jones	1	0	0+1	0	0+0	0	0+0	0	0+0	0
25	DF	(Scotland) SCO	Paul Coutts	19	0	14+5	0	0+0	0	0+0	0	0+0	0
27	FW	(England) ENG	Hayden Campbell	2	0	0+0	0	0+0	0	0+0	0	0+2	0
28	MF	(England) ENG	Alex Denny	12	0	4+5	0	0+0	0	0+0	0	3+0	0
29	FW	(Wales) WAL	Matt Sargent	1	0	0+0	0	0+0	0	0+0	0	1+0	0
30	DF	(England) ENG	Harry Ditchfield	1	0	0+0	0	0+0	0	0+0	0	0+1	0
31	GK	(United States) USA	William Evans	1	0	0+0	0	0+0	0	0+0	0	1+0	0
32	DF	(England) ENG	Tylor Golden	12	0	6+1	0	1+0	0	0+0	0	4+0	0
33	MF	(England) ENG	Liam Loughlan	4	0	0+0	0	0+0	0	0+0	0	2+2	0
34	MF	(England) ENG	Alex Doyle	1	0	0+0	0	0+0	0	0+0	0	1+0	0
35	DF	(England) ENG	Sam Fielding	4	0	0+0	0	1+0	0	0+0	0	2+1	0
36	FW	(Wales) WAL	Dan Hawkins	4	0	0+0	0	1+0	0	0+0	0	3+0	0
37	FW	(Ghana) GHA	Brandon Thomas-Asante	50	6	27+15	5	2+0	0	1+1	0	4+0	1
38	MF	(England) ENG	Will Shepherd	1	0	0+0	0	0+0	0	0+0	0	0+1	0
39	FW	(Wales) WAL	Momodou Touray	1	0	0+0	0	0+0	0	0+0	0	0+1	0
40	FW	(England) ENG	Ian Henderson	49	18	45+1	17	1+0	0	2+0	1	0+0	0

== Transfers ==
=== Transfers in ===
Date	Position	Nationality	Name	From	Fee	Ref.
14 July 2020	CB	(England)	Tom Clarke	(England) Preston North End	Free transfer	
17 July 2020	RW	(England)	Ashley Hunter	(England) Fleetwood Town	Undisclosed	
22 July 2020	DM	(England)	Jason Lowe	(England) Bolton Wanderers	Free transfer	
28 July 2020	CB	(England)	Jordan Turnbull	(England) Northampton Town	Free transfer	
29 July 2020	CF	(England)	Ian Henderson	(England) Rochdale	Free transfer	
22 August 2020	GK	(Czech Republic)	Václav Hladký	(Scotland) St Mirren	Free transfer	
31 August 2020	DM	(England)	Alex Denny	(England) Everton	Free transfer	
31 August 2020	RB	(United States)	Tylor Golden	(England) Wigan Athletic	Free transfer	
31 August 2020	GK	(England)	Nick Hayes	(England) Norwich City	Free transfer	
31 August 2020	CM	(England)	Liam Loughlan	(England) Leicester City	Free transfer	
31 August 2020	CF	(Wales)	Momodou Touray	(Wales) Newport County	Free transfer	
3 November 2020	LW	(Scotland)	George Boyd	(England) Peterborough United	Free transfer	

=== Loans in ===
Date	Position	Nationality	Name	From	Date until	Ref.
16 October 2020	CB	(England)	Di'Shon Bernard	(England) Manchester United	January 2021	
15 January 2021	RB	(England)	Robbie Gotts	(England) Leeds United	End of season	
18 January 2021	RB	(Wales)	Tom James	(Scotland) Hibernian	End of season	
21 January 2021	CM	(Scotland)	Paul Coutts	(England) Fleetwood Town	End of season	

=== Loans out ===
Date	Position	Nationality	Name	To	Date until	Ref.
25 August 2020	CM	(England)	Luke Burgess	(England) AFC Fylde	1 January 2021	
11 September 2020	LB	(England)	Dan Jones	(England) Harrogate Town	End of season	
8 December 2020	CF	(England)	Luke Armstrong	(England) Hartlepool United	End of season	
1 February 2021	DM	(England)	Alex Denny	(England) Morecambe	End of season	
22 February 2021	RB	(England)	Tylor Golden	(England) Notts County	23 March 2021	

=== Transfers out ===
Date	Position	Nationality	Name	To	Fee	Ref.
1 July 2020	LB	(England)	Josh Askew	(England) Boston United	Released	
1 July 2020	DF	(England)	Max Broughton	(United States) SIU Edwardsville Cougars	Free transfer	
1 July 2020	LW	(Scotland)	Craig Conway	(Scotland) St Johnstone	Released	
1 July 2020	CM	(England)	Kieran Glynn	(England) Scarborough Athletic	Released	
1 July 2020	GK	(Wales)	Kyle Letheren	(England) Chesterfield	Released	
1 July 2020	GK	(England)	Chris Neal	(England) AFC Fylde	Released	
1 July 2020	CM	(Northern Ireland)	Michael O'Connor	(Northern Ireland) Glenavon	Released	
1 July 2020	CB	(Montserrat)	Nathan Pond	(England) AFC Fylde	Released	
1 July 2020	RW	(England)	Devante Rodney	(England) Port Vale	Released	
1 July 2020	CM	(England)	Mark Shelton	(England) Hartlepool United	Released	
1 July 2020	RB	(Gibraltar)	Scott Wiseman	(Gibraltar) Lincoln Red Imps	Released	
2 August 2020	CB	(England)	Carl Piergianni	(England) Oldham Athletic	Undisclosed	
3 August 2020	CM	(England)	Danny Whitehead	(England) Port Vale	Free transfer	
29 August 2020	CF	(England)	Kamar Moncrieffe	(England) Clitheroe	Free transfer	
3 September 2020	AM	(England)	Luke Duffy	(England) Warrington Town	Free transfer	
3 September 2020	RW	(England)	Danny Lloyd	(England) Tranmere Rovers	Mutual consent	
6 September 2020	CB	(England)	Tyrell Warren	(England) Boston United	Free transfer	
6 September 2020	CF	(Ivory Coast)	Florian Yonsian	(England) Trafford	Free transfer	
9 November 2020	CM	(Northern Ireland)	Joey Jones	(England) Dagenham & Redbridge	Mutual consent	
14 January 2021	CM	(England)	Martin Smith	(England) Chesterfield	Free transfer	
8 February 2021	GK	(England)	Nick Hayes	(England) Hemel Hempstead Town	Free transfer	

== Pre-season ==
22 August 2020 Friendly	Salford City	1–3	Preston North End	Salford
15:00 BST	Hunter 28'	Report	Sinclair 22'; Bodin 24'; Harrop 86'	Stadium: The Peninsula Stadium; Referee: Scott Oldham

25 August 2020 Friendly	Stockport County	1–0	Salford City	Stockport
15:00 BST	Reid 82'	Report		Stadium: Edgeley Park; Attendance: 0

29 August 2020 Friendly	Salford City	0–1	Accrington Stanley	Salford
15:00 BST			Cassidy 52' (pen.)	Stadium: The Peninsula Stadium; Attendance: 0

== Competitions ==
=== EFL League Two ===
==== League table ====
Pos	Team	Pld	W	D	L	GF	GA	GD	Pts	Promotion, qualification or relegation
4	Morecambe (O, P)	46	23	9	14	69	58	+11	78	Qualification for League Two play-offs
5	Newport County	46	20	13	13	57	42	+15	73	Qualification for League Two play-offs
6	Forest Green Rovers	46	20	13	13	59	51	+8	73	Qualification for League Two play-offs
7	Tranmere Rovers	46	20	13	13	55	50	+5	73	Qualification for League Two play-offs
8	Salford City	46	19	14	13	54	34	+20	71	
9	Exeter City	46	18	16	12	71	50	+21	70	
10	Carlisle United	46	18	12	16	60	51	+9	66	
11	Leyton Orient	46	17	10	19	53	55	−2	61	
12	Crawley Town	46	16	13	17	56	62	−6	61	

Updated to match(es) played on 31 May 2021. Source: EFL Official Website
Rules for classification: 1) Points; 2) Goal difference; 3) Number of goals scored; 4) Head-to-head results; 5) Wins; 6) Away goals; 7) Penalty points (sec 9.5); 8) 12-point sending off offences
(O) Play-off winners; (P) Promoted

==== Results summary ====
Overall								Home						Away					
Pld	W	D	L	GF	GA	GD	Pts	W	D	L	GF	GA	GD	W	D	L	GF	GA	GD
46	19	14	13	54	34	+20	71	11	11	1	36	15	+21	8	3	12	18	19	−1

Last updated: 8 May 2021.
Source: BBC

==== Results by matchday ====
Matchday	1	2	3	4	5	6	7	8	9	10	11	12	13	14	15	16	17	18	19	20	21	22	23	24	25	26	27	28	29	30	31	32	33	34	35	36	37	38	39	40	41	42	43	44	45	46
Ground	H	A	H	A	H	A	H	H	H	A	A	H	H	A	A	H	H	A	H	A	A	A	A	H	A	H	H	H	A	A	H	H	A	H	A	A	H	A	H	H	A	A	H	A	A	H
Result	D	W	D	W	D	L	W	D	W	L	L	W	W	L	W	D	D	W	W	L	L	W	D	D	L	W	W	D	L	D	W	D	L	D	L	L	D	W	W	L	D	W	W	W	L	W
Position	9	4	7	3	5	11	7	8	9	10	11	8	7	9	7	8	9	7	6	8	8	5	5	5	8	9	4	5	8	9	7	9	9	9	9	11	11	10	9	10	11	9	8	7	9	8

Updated to match(es) played on 8 May 2021. Source: 11v11 for league tables and fixtures
A = Away; H = Home; W = Win; D = Draw; L = Loss

==== Matches ====
Win Draw Loss Postponed

The 2020–21 season fixtures were released on 21 August.

12 September 2020 1	Salford City	2–2	Exeter City	Salford
15:00 BST	Henderson 2'; Elliott (yellow card) 54'; Hunter 69'	Report	Jay 22'; Randall 35'	Stadium: Peninsula Stadium; Attendance: 0 Referee: Sam Barrott

19 September 2020 2	Grimsby Town	0–4	Salford City	Cleethorpes
15:00 BST	Tilley (yellow card) 48'; Öhman (red card) 90+2'	Report	Hunter (yellow card) 28'; Henderson 32' (pen.), 63' (pen.), 76'; Towell (yellow card) 56' (goal) 90+3' (pen.); Touray (yellow card) 89'	Stadium: Blundell Park; Attendance: 0 Referee: Declan Bourne

26 September 2020 3	Salford City	0–0	Forest Green Rovers	Salford
15:00 BST	Turnbull (yellow card) 18'; Hunter (yellow card) 84'	Report	Cadden (yellow card) 59'	Stadium: Peninsula Stadium; Attendance: 0 Referee: Thomas Bramall

3 October 2020 4	Stevenage	0–1	Salford City	Stevenage
15:00 BST	Newton (yellow card) 70'	Report	Hunter 2'; Turnbull (yellow card) 19'; Golden (yellow card) 48'	Stadium: The Lamex Stadium; Attendance: 0 Referee: Craig Hicks

10 October 2020 5	Salford City	2–2	Tranmere Rovers	Salford
15:00 BST	Towell 2'; Wilson 20'	Report	Khan (yellow card) 6'; Morris (yellow card) 45+1' (goal) 86'; Lewis (yellow card) 48' (goal) 90+3'	Stadium: Moor Lane; Attendance: 0 Referee: Sam Allison

17 October 2020 6	Port Vale	1–0	Salford City	Burslem
15:00 BST	Rodney (yellow card) 16'; Montaño 86'	Report	Henderson (penalty missed) 38'	Stadium: Vale Park; Attendance: 0 Referee: James Adcock

20 October 2020 7	Salford City	3–0	Southend United	Salford
19:45 BST	Lennon 26' (o.g.); Clarke (yellow card) 50'; Wilson 58'; Henderson 63'; Thomas-Asante (yellow card) 71'	Report	Olayinka (yellow card) 27'; Dieng (yellow card) 43'; Lennon (yellow card) 45+1'; Taylor (yellow card) 81'; Demetriou (yellow card) 90+1'	Stadium: Moor Lane; Attendance: 0 Referee: Carl Boyeson

24 October 2020 8	Salford City	1–1	Crawley Town	Salford
15:00 BST	Threlkeld (yellow card) 38'; Wilson 57'; Clarke (yellow card) 76'; Thomas-Asante (yellow card) 81'	Report	Hesketh (yellow card) 34'; Powell (yellow card) 37'; Francomb 72'	Stadium: Moor Lane; Attendance: 0 Referee: Andy Haines

31 October 2020 9	Salford City	2–0	Oldham Athletic	Salford
15:00 GMT	Wilson 24'; Lowe (yellow card) 30'; Hunter 73'; Thomas-Asante (yellow card) 80'	Report	Borthwick-Jackson (yellow card) 31'	Stadium: Moor Lane; Attendance: 0 Referee: Anthony Backhouse

3 November 2020 10	Cambridge United	2–1	Salford City	Cambridge
19:00 GMT	Iredale 43'; Ironside 49' (pen.)	Report	Henderson 31'; Hunter (yellow card) 85'; Lowe (yellow card) 90+2'	Stadium: Abbey Stadium; Attendance: 0 Referee: Declan Bourne

13 November 2020 11	Bolton Wanderers	2–0	Salford City	Horwich
19:45 BST	Doyle 24'; Turnbull 68' (o.g.)	Report		Stadium: University of Bolton Stadium; Attendance: 0 Referee: Darren Drysdale

21 November 2020 12	Salford City	3–0	Bradford City	Salford
15:00 GMT	Burgess 8', 45+1'; Henderson 21'; Hunter (yellow card) 48'	Report	Richards-Everton (yellow card) 2'	Stadium: Moor Lane; Attendance: 0 Referee: Carl Brook

24 November 2020 13	Salford City	2–1	Morecambe	Salford
19:00 GMT	Denny (yellow card) 6'; Smith (yellow card) 10'; Henderson (yellow card) 28'; Andrade (yellow card) 36'; Hunter 41', 44'; Elliott (yellow card) 86'	Report	Lavelle (yellow card) 40'; Stockton 54'; Songo'o (yellow card) 60'; Cooney (yellow card) 90+3'	Stadium: Moor Lane; Attendance: 0 Referee: Neil Hair

2 December 2020 14	Carlisle United	2–1	Salford City	Carlisle
19:00 GMT	Guy (yellow card) 2'; Alessandra 33'; Mellish (yellow card) 36'; Kayode (yellow card) 45'; Bennett 56'; Tanner (yellow card) 66'	Report	Touray (yellow card) 64'; Bernard (yellow card) 88' (goal) 90'	Stadium: Brunton Park; Attendance: 2,000; Referee: Graham Salisbury

5 December 2020 15	Barrow	0–1	Salford City	Barrow-in-Furness
15:00 GMT	Quigley (yellow card) 21'	Report	Clarke (yellow card) 7'; Hunter 49'; Towell (yellow card) 80'; Smith (yellow card) 90+3'; Lowe (yellow card) 90+4'	Stadium: Furness Building Society Stadium; Attendance: 819; Referee: Tom Nield

12 December 2020 16	Salford City	0–0	Cheltenham Town	Salford
15:00 GMT	Henderson (yellow card) 58'	Report		Stadium: Moor Lane; Attendance: 0 Referee: Ben Toner

15 December 2020 17	Salford City	1–1	Newport County	Salford
19:00 GMT	Clarke 44'; Henderson (penalty missed) 56'; Threlkeld (yellow card) 75'; Hladký (yellow card) 87'; Touray (yellow card) 90+3'	Report	Willmott (yellow card) 56'; Shephard (yellow card) 81'; Sheehan 90+4' (pen.)	Stadium: Moor Lane; Attendance: 0 Referee: Ross Joyce

19 December 2020 18	Harrogate Town	0–1	Salford City	Harrogate
15:00 GMT	Kirby (yellow card) 36'; Burrell (yellow card) 43'; Fallowfield (yellow card) 82'	Report	Wilson 17'; Eastham (yellow card) 81'	Stadium: The EnviroVent Stadium; Attendance: 0 Referee: Trevor Kettle

26 December 2020 19	Salford City	2–0	Walsall	Salford
15:00 GMT	Wilson 16'; Hunter (yellow card) 49'; Touray (yellow card) 54'; Burgess 87'	Report		Stadium: Moor Lane; Attendance: 0 Referee: Scott Oldham

2 January 2021 20	Leyton Orient	1–0	Salford City	Leyton
15:00 GMT	Johnson 31'; Brophy (yellow card) 62'; Ling (yellow card) 85'	Report	Lowe (yellow card) 35'	Stadium: Breyer Group Stadium; Attendance: 0 Referee: Carl Brook

5 January 2021 21	Mansfield Town	2–1	Salford City	Mansfield
19:00 GMT	Lapslie 15'; Bowery 30'	Report	Hunter (yellow card) 65'; Eastham (yellow card) 72'; Bernard 90+1'	Stadium: One Call Stadium; Attendance: 0 Referee: Will Finnie

12 January 2021 22	Scunthorpe United	0–1	Salford City	Scunthorpe
19:00 GMT		Report	Henderson 89'	Stadium: Sands Venue Stadium; Attendance: 0 Referee: Martin Coy

16 January 2021 23	Newport County	0–0	Salford City	Newport
15:00 GMT	Sheehan (red card) 58'; Bennett (yellow card) 78'	Report		Stadium: Rodney Parade; Attendance: 0 Referee: Anthony Backhouse

22 January 2021 24	Salford City	2–2	Harrogate Town	Salford
19:00 GMT	Gotts 21'; James (yellow card) 49'; Lowe (yellow card) 56'; Touray (yellow card) 67'; Thomas-Asante 70'; Hladký (yellow card) 90+4'	Report	Muldoon 37'; Francis 90+3'	Stadium: Peninsula Stadium; Attendance: 0 Referee: Marc Edwards

30 January 2021 25	Oldham Athletic	2–1	Salford City	Oldham
15:00 GMT	Bahamboula 75'; Clarke (yellow card) 76'; Keillor-Dunn 90+2'	Report	Henderson 9'; Coutts (yellow card) 72'	Stadium: Boundary Park; Attendance: 0 Referee: Thomas Bramall

9 February 2021 26	Salford City	4–1	Cambridge United	Salford
17:30 GMT	Henderson 19', 69'; Towell 33'; Gotts 42'	Report	Mullin 71'	Stadium: Moor Lane; Attendance: 0 Referee: Ollie Yates

16 February 2021 27	Salford City	1–0	Barrow	Salford
19:00 GMT	Henderson 29'; Hunter (yellow card) 70'; Coutts (yellow card) 90+6'	Report	Thomas (yellow card) 74'; Banks (yellow card) 81'	Stadium: Moor Lane; Attendance: 0 Referee: Trevor Kettle

20 February 2021 28	Salford City	1–1	Carlisle United	Salford
15:00 GMT	Touray (yellow card) 17'; Turnbull (yellow card) 58'; Wilson 79'	Report	Tanner 11'; Bennett (yellow card) 45+1'; Mellish (yellow card) 55'	Stadium: Moor Lane; Attendance: 0 Referee: Kevin Johnson

23 February 2021 29	Morecambe	2–1	Salford City	Morecambe
18:30 GMT	Songo'o (yellow card) 49'; Lavelle (yellow card) 90'; Mendes Gomes 90+4'; Wildig 90+6'	Report	Thomas-Asante 45+1'; Threlkeld (yellow card) 90+2'; Turnbull (yellow card) 90+5'; Hladký (yellow card) 90+9'	Stadium: Mazuma Stadium; Attendance: 0 Referee: Seb Stockbridge

27 February 2021 30	Southend United	0–0	Salford City	Southend-on-Sea
15:00 GMT	Hackett-Fairchild (yellow card) 14'; McCormack (yellow card) 79'	Report	Gotts (yellow card) 61'	Stadium: Roots Hall; Attendance: 0 Referee: Dean Whitestone

2 March 2021 31	Salford City	1–0	Port Vale	Salford
19:00 GMT	Henderson 45', (yellow card) 53'; Lowe (yellow card) 47'; Touray (yellow card) 62'	Report	Gibbons (yellow card) 4'; Brisley (yellow card) 90+3'	Stadium: Moor Lane; Attendance: 0 Referee: Tom Nield

6 March 2021 32	Salford City	1–1	Scunthorpe United	Salford
15:00 GMT	Touray (yellow card) 14'; Clarke 33'; Thomas-Asante (yellow card) 68'; Henderson (yellow card) 88'	Report	van Veen (yellow card) 21'; Rowe (yellow card) 34'; Eisa 43' (pen.); Hippolyte (yellow card) 45+1'	Stadium: Moor Lane; Attendance: 0 Referee: Allan Young

9 March 2021 33	Crawley Town	1–0	Salford City	Crawley
19:00 GMT	Nichols 21'; Nadesan (yellow card) 49'	Report	Coutts (yellow card) 24'; Thomas-Asante (yellow card) 42'; Towell (yellow card) 61'	Stadium: The People's Pension Stadium; Attendance: 0 Referee: Sam Allison

16 March 2021 34	Salford City	0–0	Colchester United	Salford
19:00 GMT	Eastham (yellow card) 42'; Turnbull (yellow card) 82'	Report	Smith (yellow card) 19'	Stadium: Moor Lane; Attendance: 0 Referee: Scott Oldham

20 March 2021 35	Cheltenham Town	2–0	Salford City	Cheltenham
15:00 GMT	Long 3'; Sercombe (yellow card) 16', (goal) 41'; Thomas (yellow card) 64'	Report		Stadium: Whaddon Road Ground; Attendance: 0 Referee: Lee Swabey

27 March 2021 36	Exeter City	1–0	Salford City	Exeter
13:00 GMT	Jay 34'; Willmott (yellow card) 79'; Hartridge (yellow card) 90+4'; Bowman (yellow card) 90+4'	Report	Hladký (yellow card) 89'; Turnbull (yellow card) 90+2'	Stadium: St James Park; Attendance: 0 Referee: Antony Coggins

2 April 2021 37	Salford City	1–1	Grimsby Town	Salford
15:00 BST	Lowe (yellow card) 26'; Touray (yellow card) 73', (goal) 88'	Report	Clifton 2', (yellow card) 19'; Payne (yellow card) 50'; Matete (yellow card) 73'	Stadium: Moor Lane; Attendance: 0 Referee: Declan Bourne

5 April 2021 38	Forest Green Rovers	0–2	Salford City	Nailsworth
15:00 BST	Adams (yellow card) 55'	Report	Henderson 38', 77'; Threlkeld (yellow card) 46'; Thomas-Asante (yellow card) 64'	Stadium: The Innocent [Insert Name Here] Stadium; Attendance: 0 Referee: Sam Purkiss

10 April 2021 39	Salford City	2–1	Stevenage	Salford
15:00 BST	Thomas-Asante 52'; Lowe (yellow card) 60'; Henderson 76'	Report	Vancooten (yellow card) 55'; Wildin 56'	Stadium: Moor Lane; Attendance: 0 Referee: Andy Haines

13 April 2021 40	Salford City	0–1	Bolton Wanderers	Salford
19:00 BST	Clarke (yellow card) 23'; Burgess (yellow card) 80'; Hunter (yellow card) 87'	Report	Isgrove 23'; Lee (yellow card) 29'; Williams (yellow card) 45'; Thomason (yellow card) 76'	Stadium: Moor Lane; Attendance: 0 Referee: Robert Lewis

17 April 2021 41	Tranmere Rovers	0–0	Salford City	Birkenhead
12:30 BST	Woolery (yellow card) 34'; Khan (yellow card) 36'	Report	Turnbull (yellow card) 60'; Dieseruvwe (yellow card) 90'	Stadium: Prenton Park; Attendance: 0 Referee: Bobby Madley

20 April 2021 42	Walsall	0–2	Salford City	Bescot
19:00 BST		Report	Henderson 19'; Turnbull 57'; Gotts (yellow card) 90+5'; Thomas-Asante (yellow card) 90+5'	Stadium: Banks's Stadium; Attendance: 0 Referee: Peter Wright

24 April 2021 43	Salford City	2–0	Mansfield Town	Salford
15:00 BST	Hunter 5'; Henderson (yellow card) 30', (goal) 62', (penalty missed) 74'; Towell (red card) 68'	Report	Stone (yellow card) 73'	Stadium: Moor Lane; Attendance: 0 Referee: James Oldham

27 April 2021 44	Bradford City	0–1	Salford City	Bradford
19:00 BST	O'Connor (yellow card) 18'; Cooke (yellow card) 66'; Wood (yellow card) 90+1'	Report	Henderson 90+1'	Stadium: Utilita Energy Stadium; Attendance: 0 Referee: Ross Joyce

1 May 2021 45	Colchester United	1–0	Salford City	Colchester
15:00 BST	Bohui 68'; Sarpong-Wiredu (yellow card) 72'	Report	Bernard (yellow card) 15' (yellow-red card) 32'; Turnbull (yellow card) 79'; Eastham (yellow card) 82'; Threlkeld (yellow card) 86'; Hunter (red card) 90+5'	Stadium: JobServe Community Stadium; Attendance: 0 Referee: Leigh Doughty

8 May 2021 46	Salford City	3–0	Leyton Orient	Salford
16:00 BST	Boyd (penalty missed) 14'; Gotts 42'; Thomas-Asante 50', 66'; Golden (yellow card) 68'	Report	Happe (yellow card) 14'; Akinola (yellow card) 80'	Stadium: Moor Lane; Attendance: 0 Referee: Darren Drysdale

=== FA Cup ===
The draw for the first round was made on Monday 26, October. The second round draw was revealed on Monday, 9 November by Danny Cowley.

Win Draw Loss

7 November 2020 First round	Salford City	2–0 (a.e.t.)	Hartlepool United	Salford
15:00 GMT	Lowe (yellow card) 62'; Hunter (yellow card) 87'; Bernard (yellow card) 91'; Andrade 105+1'; Hladký (yellow card) 117'; Dieseruvwe 120+3'	Report	Ofosu (yellow card) 13'	Stadium: Moor Lane; Attendance: 0 Referee: Carl Boyeson

28 November 2020 Second round	Newport County	3–0	Salford City	Newport
13:00 GMT	Proctor 56'; Amond 75' (pen.); Bennett (yellow card) 90+1'; Janneh 90+2'	Report	Thomas-Asante (red card) 47'; Turnbull (yellow card) 79'; Hunter (yellow card) 80'	Stadium: Rodney Parade; Attendance: 0 Referee: Kevin Johnson

=== EFL Cup ===
Win Draw Loss

The first round draw was made on 18 August, live on Sky Sports, by Paul Merson. The draw for both the second and third round were confirmed on September 6, live on Sky Sports by Phil Babb.

5 September 2020 First round	Salford City	1–1 (4–2 p)	Rotherham United	Salford
15:00 BST	Henderson 84' (pen.)	Report	Blackman (yellow card) 83'; Crooks 90+5'	Stadium: The Peninsula Stadium; Attendance: 0 Referee: James Oldham
	Penalties
	Touray (penalty scored); Henderson (penalty scored); Gibson (penalty scored); Thomas-Asante (penalty scored)		Vassell (penalty missed); Ladapo (penalty scored); Sadlier (penalty scored); Mattock (penalty missed)

16 September 2020 Second round	Everton	3–0	Salford City	Walton
20:15 BST	Keane 8'; Sigurðsson 74'; Kean 87' (pen.)	Report	Turnbull (yellow card) 58'; Thomas-Asante (yellow card) 67'	Stadium: Goodison Park; Attendance: 0 Referee: Marc Edwards

=== EFL Trophy ===
Win Draw Loss

The regional group stage draw was confirmed on 18 August. The second round draw was made by Matt Murray on 20 November, at St Andrew's.

Pos	Div	Team	Pld	W	PW	PL	L	GF	GA	GD	Pts	Qualification
1	L2	Salford City	3	2	0	0	1	4	7	−3	6	Advance to Round 2
2	ACA	Manchester United U21	3	1	1	0	1	6	4	+2	5	Advance to Round 2
3	L1	Rochdale	3	1	0	1	1	3	3	0	4	
4	L2	Morecambe	3	1	0	0	2	5	4	+1	3	

Source: EFL.com

8 September 2020 Group stage	Salford City	0–6	Manchester United U21	Salford
19:45 BST	Doyle (yellow card) 6'; Denny (yellow card) 68'	Report	Mejbri 8' (yellow card) 79'; Puigmal 29'; Helm 46', 73'; McCann 70'; Elanga 74'	Stadium: Moor Lane; Attendance: 0 Referee: Peter Wright

29 September 2020 Group stage	Salford City	2–0	Morecambe	Salford
19:45 BST	Wilson 44'; Thomas-Asante (yellow card) 75'; Touray (yellow card) 79'; Hunter 90+2'	Report	Knight-Percival (yellow card) 1'; Hendrie (yellow card) 43'	Stadium: Moor Lane; Attendance: 0 Referee: James Bell

10 November 2020 Group stage	Rochdale	1–2	Salford City	Rochdale
19:00 GMT	Beesley 8'; Rathbone (yellow card) 80'; O'Connell (yellow card) 90+6'	Report	Andrade 53'; Golden (yellow card) 57'; Dieseruvwe 82' (pen.); Burgess (yellow card) 90+4'	Stadium: Spotland; Attendance: 0 Referee: Bobby Madley

8 December 2020 Second round	Salford City	3–3 (5–6 p)	Leicester City U21	Salford
19:00 GMT	Thomas-Asante (penalty missed) 24' 24'; Golden (yellow card) 48'; Dieseruvwe 59', 78'	Report	Muskwe 64', 69'; Flynn 83'	Stadium: Moor Lane; Attendance: 0 Referee: James Oldham
	Penalties
	Dieseruvwe (penalty missed); Loughlan (penalty scored); Smith (penalty scored); Campbell (penalty scored); Thomas-Asante (penalty scored); Hawkins (penalty scored); Fielding (penalty missed)		Wright (penalty scored); Hulme (penalty scored); Reghba (penalty missed); Muskwe (penalty scored); Suengchitthawon (penalty scored); McAteer (penalty scored); Leshabela (penalty scored)
