= Ibou Touray =

English-Gambian footballer (born 1994)

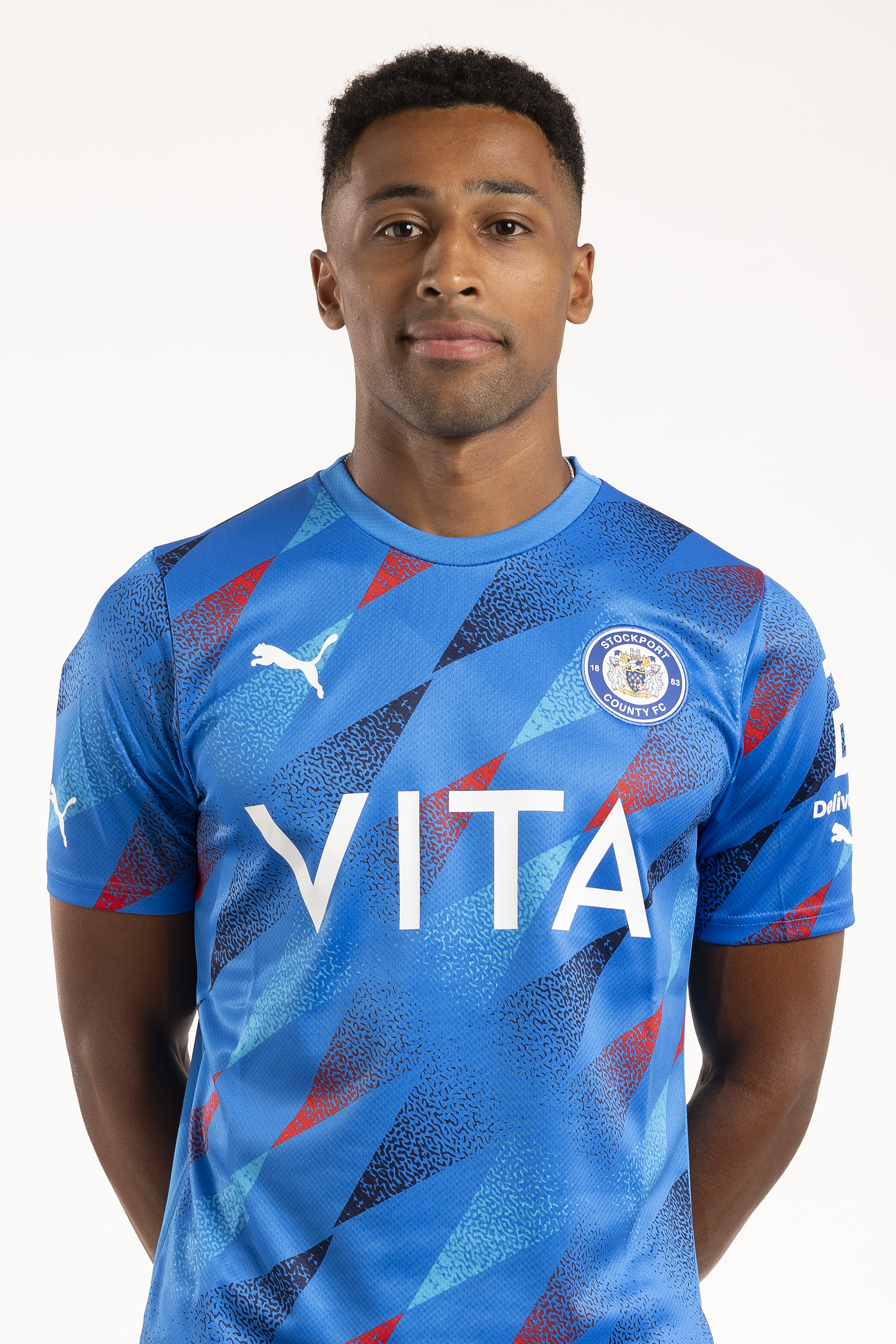
- Touray with Stockport County in the 2023–24 season

Personal information
- Full name: Ibou Omar Touray
- Date of birth: 24 December 1994 (age 31)
- Place of birth: Liverpool, England
- Height: 1.77 m (5 ft 10 in)
- Position: Left back

Team information
- Current team: Bradford City
- Number: 3

Youth career
- 2011–2014: Everton

Senior career*
| Years | Team | Apps | (Gls) |
| 2014–2015 | Chester | 19 | (0) |
| 2015–2016 | Rhyl | 29 | (2) |
| 2016–2017 | Nantwich Town | 38 | (0) |
| 2017–2023 | Salford City | 237 | (8) |
| 2023–2025 | Stockport County | 75 | (1) |
| 2025– | Bradford City | 56 | (0) |

International career^{‡}
| 2015– | Gambia | 23 | (0) |
- * Club domestic league appearances and goals as of 13:15, 22 November 2026 (UTC) ‡ National team caps and goals as of 21:07, 17 September 2024 (UTC)

Ibou Omar Touray (born 24 December 1994) is a professional footballer who plays as a left back for EFL League One club Bradford City. Born in England, he plays for the Gambia national team.

Touray began his career with local team Everton, but left in 2014 having made no appearances for the first team. He spent successive seasons in the lower leagues with Chester, Rhyl, and Nantwich Town, before signing for National League North team Salford City in 2017. He helped them achieve back to back promotions in his first two seasons, first to the National League and then to League Two, the first time Salford had reached the English Football League in their history. He is the longest serving player in the clubs' history, and helped the club win the 2020 EFL Trophy Final. During his final season, he served as the team captain.

Born in England, Touray represents Gambia internationally, qualifying through his father. He made his international debut for Gambia in 2015, and represented his country at the 2021 Africa Cup of Nations, their first ever major international tournament, helping them to reach the quarter-finals.

== Club career ==
=== Everton ===
Born in Toxteth, Liverpool, Touray started his career at Everton, having joined the club in 2011. He was close to joining Liverpool before joining Everton instead. After progressing through Everton's youth system, he signed his first professional contract at the club in July 2013. Although he was given a number 40 shirt in the 2013–14 season, he was released by the club in May 2014.

=== Chester ===
After leaving Everton in the summer, Touray went on trial at Tranmere Rovers. After the trial was unsuccessful, he joined Chester on 13 September 2014, having caught the eye of manager Steve Burr during a pre-season game between Tranmere and Chester.

After appearing as an unused substitute against Woking, Touray made his Chester debut three days after joining the club, coming on as a first half substitute in a 2–0 win over Southport. After making his Chester debut, Touray quickly established himself in the starting eleven at the club, playing in the left-midfield position. His performance attracted attention from League One side Oldham Athletic, where he was loaned out. He appeared on the substitute bench on two occasions. After returning, he appeared in every match until he was sent-off for a "wild challenge" on Nicky Clee, in a 4–1 loss to Altrincham on 31 December 2014. After he served a three match suspension Touray lost his first team place for the rest of the season and was released by the club.

=== Rhyl ===
After leaving Chester, Touray moved to Wales when he joined Rhyl.

Touray made his Rhyl debut in the opening game of the season, in a 1–1 draw against Bangor City on 21 August 2015, being selected for the starting 11. After making his Rhyl debut, he established himself in the starting eleven for the side despite missing out one game through suspension. It wasn't until 9 April 2016 Touray scored his first goals, in a 5–0 win over Port Talbot Town. Rhyl had not won in 16 matches and faced accusations of match fixing due to suspicious betting patterns. After one season at Rhyl, Touray was released in May 2016.

=== Nantwich Town ===
After being released by Rhyl, he signed for Nantwich Town. His move came after at a recommendation from the club's manager Dave Cooke.

Touray made his Nantwich Town debut in the opening game of the season, in a 1–1 draw against Ashton United. Throughout the season, Touray established himself in the starting eleven at Nantwich Town as a left-back. He'a also played a role when the club won 5–3 in the penalty shootout to the final of Cheshire Senior Cup against Warrington Town. However, the club went on to lose the final after losing to Crewe Alexandra 3–2.

After making 41 appearances in all competitions, Touray was awarded the club's Young Player of the Year.

=== Salford City ===
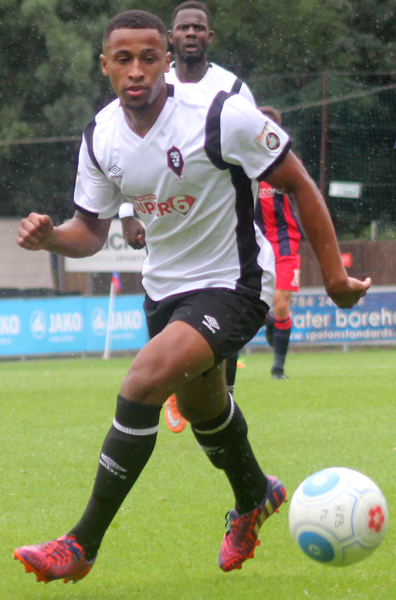
Touray playing for Salford City in 2017.

He's resilient, trains every single day to his maximum... He's learning more and more about the game, certainly as a full-back and the many challenges you face. When a player is as fit as he possibly can be, he understands what's required from him in the team and he goes out and commits every day, anything can happen for him in a positive way.

— Touray's manager at Salford City Graham Alexander praising his character in 2019

In May 2017, he signed for Salford City. Touray made his Salford City debut in the opening game of the season, in a 2–0 loss against Darlington. At the conclusion of the 2018–19 season as Salford earned back-to-back promotions into the Football League, Touray scored Salford's third goal in the 2019 National League play-off final, a 3–0 victory against AFC Fylde at Wembley Stadium on 11 May 2019. In 2021, he played in the delayed 2020 EFL Trophy final against Portsmouth, helping keep a clean sheet in a 0–0 draw before Salford won the resulting penalty shoot-out.

Following an impressive 2020–21 season, Touray was named in the 2020–21 EFL League Two Team of the Season at the league's annual awards ceremony. In June 2021, Touray signed a new two-year contract; Touray and manager Gary Bowyer both cited a connection with Salford's supporters as being key to the new deal. He made his 200th appearance for The Ammies against Bristol Rovers in November 2021, cementing his record as the club's modern-day record appearance holder.

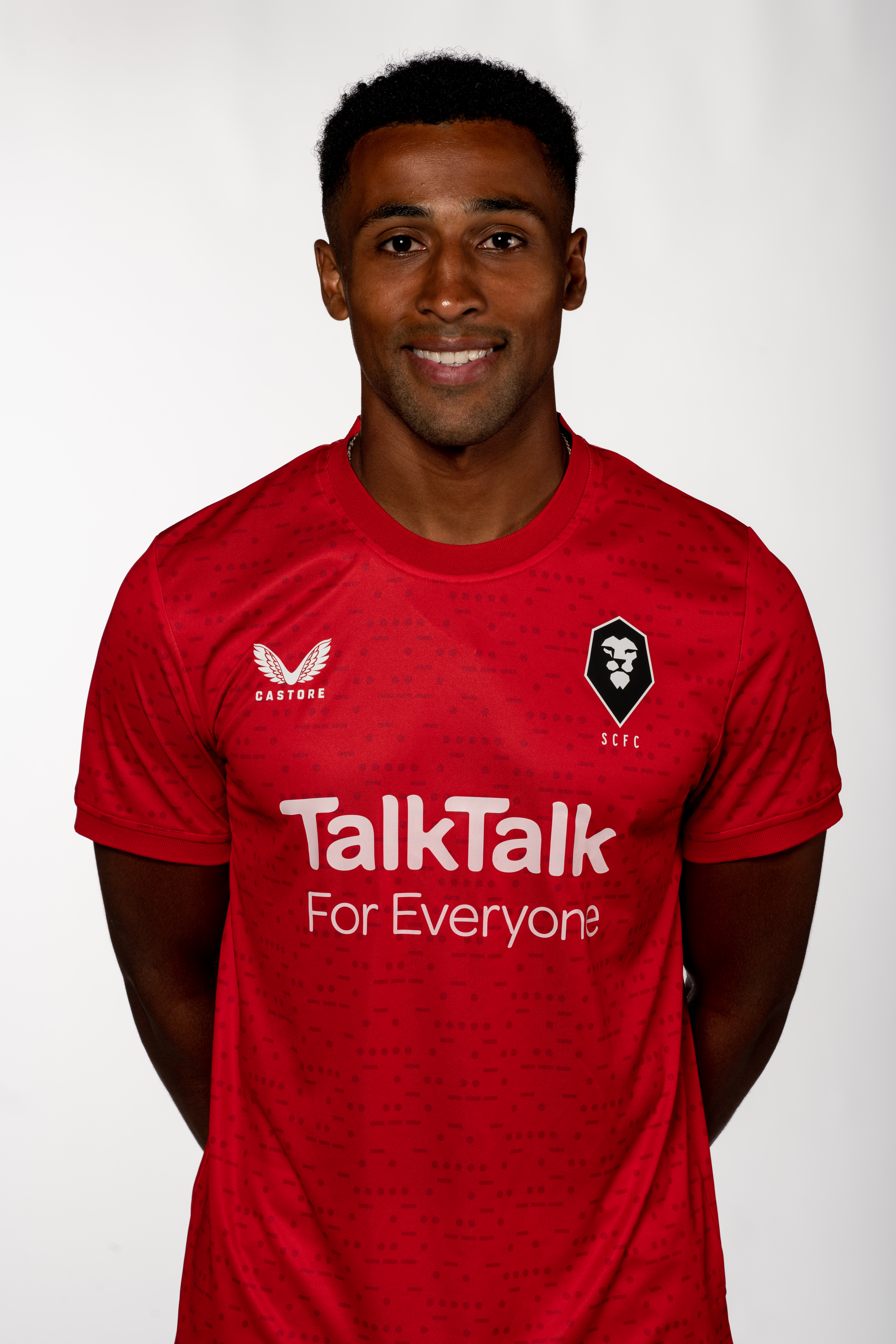
Touray with Salford City in the 2022–23 season

In January 2023, he made his 250th Salford appearance in a 2–0 league win against Sutton United. Along with teammate Elliot Watt, Touray was named in the EFL League Two Team of the Season for the 2022–23 season.

=== Stockport County ===
In June 2023, it was announced that he would sign for Stockport County on 1 July 2023. Touray scored his first goal for The Hatters against former club Salford at Moor Lane on 14 March 2024, scoring his teams' first to help overcome a two-goal deficit.

On 20 May 2025, the club announced they had offered Touray a new contract. Three weeks later however, the club announced Touray would be leaving once his contract expired.

=== Bradford City ===
On 20 June 2025, it was announced that Touray would join Bradford City on 1 July 2025, being unveiled in the club's photo shoot for their new away kit. Bradford's manager Graham Alexander had previously managed Touray at Salford, and Alexander said that Touray would fit in with his new club.

He scored his first goal for the club on 12 August 2025, scoring the opening goal in a 2–1 win away at Blackburn Rovers in the EFL Cup.

In October 2025, Touray praised his teammates after a run of good form, saying the players were not going to get distracted. After a lull in form, he said in late November that the team were again improving. In February 2026 he spoke about the pressure the team were under as they challenged for promotion, and in April said his experience would help in the play-offs.

At the start of the 2026–27 season, Touray played as a wing back to cover for the injured Tyreik Wright. He was critical of both himself and his teammates following the 3–0 defeat at home to rivals Huddersfield Town on 31 October 2026.

== International career ==
He made his international debut for Gambia in 2015. Touray is eligible for Gambia through his father, who moved to England aged 16, and is one of several of the Gambian diaspora called up who helped the country's results improve. In a 2021 interview, Touray said that his proudest moment in international football was when Gambia drew 1–1 with Algeria, who at the time were unbeaten in over two years.

Touray played in the 2021 Africa Cup of Nations, his national team's first continental tournament, where they made the quarter-final. He described representing the country at the tournament, as well as visiting the residency of Adama Barrow, the President of the Gambia, as "surreal". He missed the knockout stage match against Guinea through illness.

At the 2023 Africa Cup of Nations, Touray became the first Stockport County player to feature at a major international tournament.

He was recalled by Gambia in September 2026 for forthcoming African Cup of Nations qualifying matches. He said it was "unbelievable" to be recalled.

== Career statistics ==
=== Club ===
As of match played 21 November 2026

Appearances and goals by club, season and competition
| Club | Season | League | | | National Cup | | League Cup | | Other | | Total | |
| Club | Season | Division | Apps | Goals | Apps | Goals | Apps | Goals | Apps | Goals | Apps | Goals |
|---|---|---|---|---|---|---|---|---|---|---|---|---|
| Chester | 2014–15 | Conference Premier | 19 | 0 | 1 | 0 | — | | 3 (Note: Two appearances in FA Trophy, one appearance and one goal in Cheshire Senior Cup) | 1 | 23 | 1 |
| Rhyl | 2015–16 | Welsh Premier League | 29 | 2 | 0 | 0 | — | | 0 | 0 | 29 | 2 |
| Nantwich Town | 2016–17 | NPL Premier Division | 38 | 0 | 5 | 0 | 1 | 0 | 9 (Note: Three appearances in FA Trophy, five appearances in Cheshire Senior Cup, one appearance in NPL Premier Division play-offs) | 0 | 53 | 0 |
| Salford City | 2017–18 | National League North | 39 | 0 | 0 | 0 | — | | 0 | 0 | 39 | 0 |
| Salford City | 2018–19 | National League | 45 | 3 | 3 | 0 | — | | 4 (Note: Two appearances in FA Trophy, two appearances in National League play-offs) | 0 | 52 | 3 |
| Salford City | 2019–20 | League Two | 35 | 4 | 2 | 1 | 1 | 0 | 4 (Note: Appearance(s) in EFL Trophy) | 0 | 42 | 5 |
| Salford City | 2020–21 | League Two | 46 | 1 | 1 | 0 | 2 | 0 | 2 (Note: Includes appearance in the 2020 EFL Trophy final which was postponed until 13 March 2021 due to the COVID-19 pandemic) | 0 | 51 | 1 |
| Salford City | 2021–22 | League Two | 27 | 0 | 2 | 0 | 1 | 0 | 2 | 1 | 32 | 1 |
| Salford City | 2022–23 | League Two | 45 | 0 | 2 | 0 | 1 | 0 | 8 (Note: Six appearances in EFL Trophy, two appearances in League Two play-offs) | 0 | 56 | 0 |
| Salford City | Total | | 237 | 8 | 10 | 1 | 5 | 0 | 20 | 1 | 272 | 10 |
| Stockport County | 2023–24 | League Two | 32 | 1 | 2 | 0 | 1 | 0 | 3 | 0 | 38 | 1 |
| Stockport County | 2024–25 | League One | 43 | 0 | 3 | 0 | 1 | 0 | 3 (Note: One appearance in the EFL Trophy, two appearances in the EFL League One play-offs) | 0 | 50 | 0 |
| Stockport County | Total | | 75 | 1 | 3 | 0 | 1 | 0 | 3 | 0 | 88 | 1 |
| Bradford City | 2025–26 | League One | 42 | 0 | 1 | 0 | 3 | 1 | 6 (Note: Four appearances in the EFL Trophy, two appearances in the play-offs) | 0 | 52 | 1 |
| Bradford City | 2026–27 | League One | 14 | 0 | 1 | 0 | 4 | 0 | 0 | 0 | 19 | 0 |
| Bradford City | Total | | 56 | 0 | 2 | 0 | 7 | 1 | 6 | 0 | 71 | 1 |
| Career total | | | 454 | 11 | 23 | 1 | 15 | 1 | 44 | 2 | 536 | 15 |

=== International ===
Appearances and goals by national team and year
| National team | Year | Apps | Goals |
|---|---|---|---|
| Gambia | 2015 | 1 | 0 |
| Gambia | 2016 | 2 | 0 |
| Gambia | 2019 | 3 | 0 |
| Gambia | 2021 | 2 | 0 |
| Gambia | 2022 | 9 | 0 |
| Gambia | 2023 | 4 | 0 |
| Gambia | 2024 | 3 | 0 |
| Total | | 23 | 0 |

== Honours ==
Salford City

- National League play-offs: 2019
- National League North: 2017–18
- EFL Trophy: 2019–20

Stockport County

- EFL League Two: 2023–24

Individual

- Salford City Player of the Season: 2019–20
- EFL League Two Team of the Season: 2020–21, 2022–23
- PFA Team of the Year: 2022–23 League Two, 2023–24 League Two
