= Alex Doyle (footballer, born 2001) =

English footballer

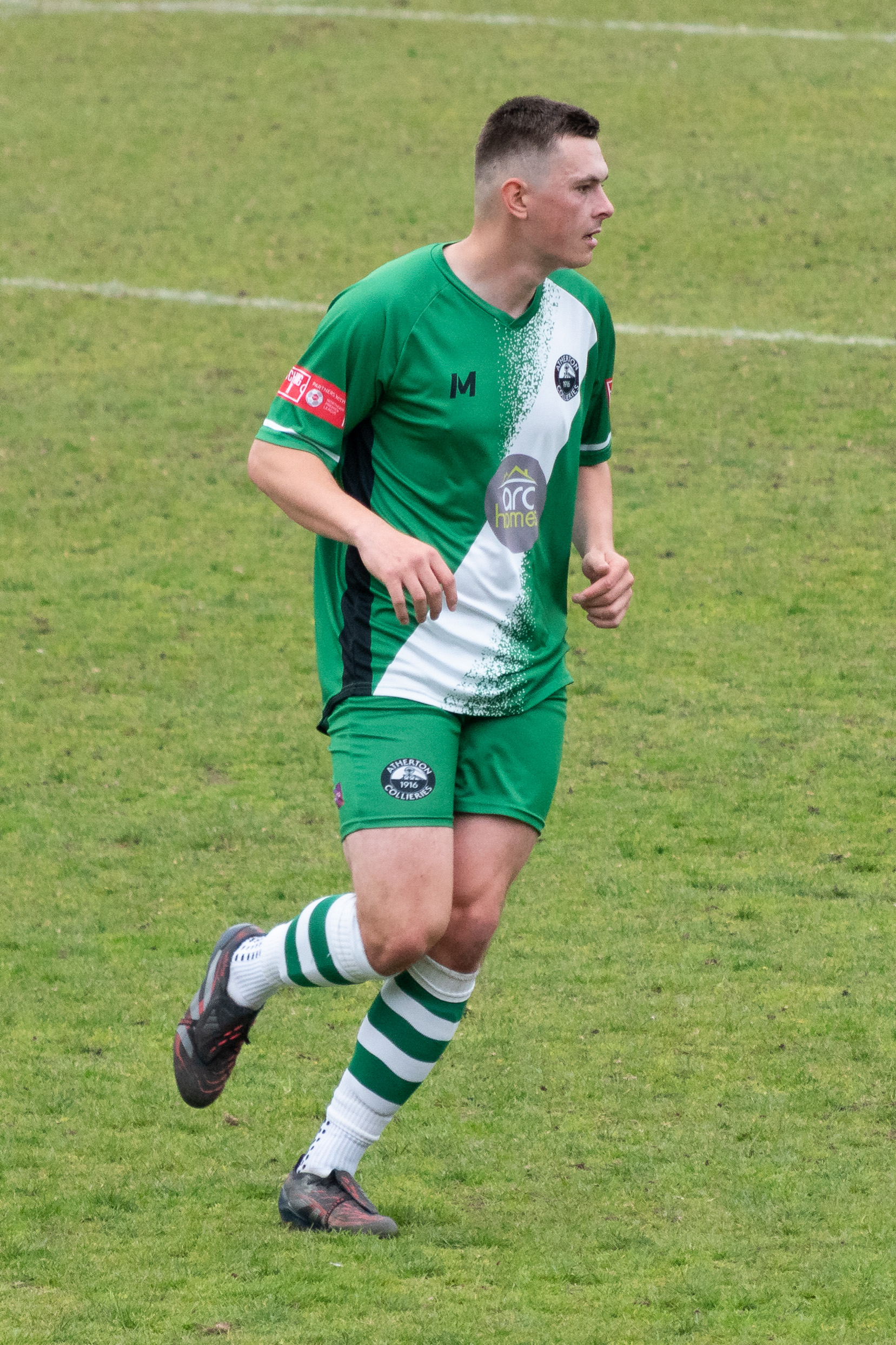
- Doyle playing for Atherton Collieries in 2025

Personal information
- Full name: Alex Matthew Doyle
- Date of birth: 17 February 2001 (age 25)
- Place of birth: Salford, England
- Position: Midfielder

Youth career
- 2017–2018: Salford City

Senior career*
| Years | Team | Apps | (Gls) |
| 2018–2021 | Salford City | 2 | (0) |
| 2020–2021 | → Marine (loan) | 4 | (0) |
| 2021–2023 | Marine | 41 | (3) |
| 2023 | → Colne (loan) | | |
| 2023–2024 | Colne | | |
| 2024–2026 | Atherton Collieries | 74 | (4) |
- * Club domestic league appearances and goals as of 15:16, 4 May 2023 (UTC)

Alex Matthew Doyle (born 17 February 2001) is an English footballer who played as a midfielder for Northern Premier League Division One West club Atherton Collieries (2024-2026)

He began his career with Salford City, where he made his debut in 2018, and was the club's first academy graduate to play in the English Football League. He is the older brother of Manchester City defender Callum Doyle.

== Career ==
Doyle is a product of the Salford City academy. He made his English Football League debut on 14 September 2019. He was awarded a professional contract with the club in the summer of 2019 after being a member of Academy92 which included studying a two-year programme at Trafford College.

In September 2020 he joined Marine on loan. At the end of the 2020–21 season, it was announced that he would be leaving Salford City. In July 2021 he joined Marine. On 15 August, Doyle scored on his second Marine debut, the team's second in a 3–1 on the opening day of the season against Newcastle Town. He joined Colne on loan for a month in February 2023. He left Marine in May 2023.

In July 2024, Doyle joined Northern Premier League Division One West club Atherton Collieries.

== Career statistics ==
As of match played 29 November 2020

Appearances and goals by club, season and competition
| Club | Season | League | | | FA Cup | | EFL Cup | | Other | | Total | |
| Club | Season | Division | Apps | Goals | Apps | Goals | Apps | Goals | Apps | Goals | Apps | Goals |
|---|---|---|---|---|---|---|---|---|---|---|---|---|
| Salford City | 2017–18 | National League North | 1 | 0 | 0 | 0 | — | | 0 | 0 | 1 | 0 |
| Salford City | 2018–19 | National League | 0 | 0 | 0 | 0 | — | | 4 (Note: Two appearances in the FA Trophy; two appearances in the Manchester Premier Cup) | 0 | 4 | 0 |
| Salford City | 2019–20 | League Two | 1 | 0 | 0 | 0 | 0 | 0 | 1 (Note: Appearance in the EFL Trophy) | 0 | 2 | 0 |
| Salford City | 2020–21 | League Two | 0 | 0 | 0 | 0 | 0 | 0 | 1 | 0 | 1 | 0 |
| Salford City | Total | | 2 | 0 | 0 | 0 | 0 | 0 | 6 | 0 | 8 | 0 |
| Marine (loan) | 2020–21 | Northern Premier League Division One North West | 4 | 0 | 5 | 0 | — | | 2 (Note: Appearances in the FA Trophy) | 0 | 11 | 0 |
| Career total | | | 6 | 0 | 5 | 0 | 0 | 0 | 8 | 0 | 19 | 0 |
