= Dan Hawkins (footballer) =

Welsh footballer (born 2001)

Personal information
- Full name: Daniel Thomas Hawkins
- Date of birth: 22 April 2001 (age 25)
- Place of birth: Cardiff, Wales
- Position: Forward

Team information
- Current team: Haverfordwest County
- Number: 10

Youth career
- Swansea City
- Hull City

Senior career*
Years	Team	Apps	(Gls)
2019–2021	Salford City	0	(0)
2019	→ Marine (loan)	4	(1)
2019–2020	→ Stafford Rangers (loan)	9	(0)
2021	Finn Harps	11	(1)
2022	Shelbourne	5	(1)
2023–	Haverfordwest County	105	(17)

International career
- Wales Youth
- * Club domestic league appearances and goals as of 07:51, 8 November 2026 (UTC)

Daniel Thomas Hawkins (born 22 April 2001) is a Welsh professional footballer who plays as a forward for Cymru Premier club Haverfordwest County.

== Club career ==
Born in Cardiff, Hawkins spent time with Swansea City and Hull City before signing for Salford City. He spent loan spells at Marine and Stafford Rangers during the 2019–20 season.

He made his senior debut for Salford on 9 September 2020, in the EFL Trophy. At the end of the 2020–21 season, it was announced that he would be leaving the club.

In July 2021 he signed for League of Ireland Premier Division club Finn Harps. He left the club at the end of the season after 11 league appearances and 1 goal.

Hawkins signed for newly promoted club Shelbourne ahead of the 2022 season.

In March 2023 he returned to Wales, signing with Haverfordwest County.

== International career ==
Hawkins is a Wales youth international.

== Honours ==
Salford City

- EFL Trophy: 2019–20
