= Luke Burgess (footballer) =

English footballer (born 1999)

Personal information
- Full name: Luke Eugene Carroll-Burgess
- Date of birth: 3 March 1999 (age 27)
- Place of birth: Liverpool, England
- Height: 1.75 m (5 ft 9 in)
- Position: Midfielder

Team information
- Current team: Southport
- Number: 20

Youth career
- –2013: Everton
- 2013–2017: Wigan Athletic

Senior career*
Years	Team	Apps	(Gls)
2017–2020	Wigan Athletic	0	(0)
2018	→ Chorley (loan)	1	(0)
2018–2019	→ Barrow (loan)	25	(1)
2020–2022	Salford City	18	(3)
2020	→ Fylde (loan)	1	(0)
2022–2023	Oldham Athletic	11	(1)
2023	→ Altrincham (loan)	6	(0)
2023–	Southport	34	(6)
- * Club domestic league appearances and goals as of 16:50, 20 July 2023 (UTC)

Luke Eugene Carroll-Burgess (born 3 March 1999) is an English professional footballer who plays as a midfielder for National League North club Southport.

== Club career ==
Burgess joined Wigan Athletic in 2013, after progressing through the Everton youth ranks. After signing his first professional deal in the 2017–18 pre-season, Burgess made his Wigan debut during their EFL Cup tie against Blackpool, which resulted in a 2–1 victory for the Latics.

In March 2018 Burgess joined Chorley on loan for the rest of the season, and scored his first senior goal in a 3–2 win over Clitheroe in the final of the Lancashire FA Challenge Trophy.

On the eve of the 2018–19 season Burgess joined Barrow on an initial 28 day loan. Burgess scored during an FA Cup tie against former club Chorley, but Barrow lost the match 3–2. In January 2019 he extended his loan spell at Barrow until the end of the season. At the end of March he was recalled from loan.

He was offered a contract beyond May 2019 by the club.

In January 2020 he joined Salford City. and was named in the match day squad on 21 January against Accrington Stanley in a Football League Trophy match. He was confirmed as a member of the club's development team for the 2020–21 season and that he would be on going out on loan to AFC Fylde until January 2021. On 4 October, Burgess scored on his Fylde début, scoring in the last minute of a 4–2 victory against Hyde United in an FA Cup qualifying match. In October, he returned to Salford early, and made his first start for the club on 21 November against Bradford City, opening the scoring in the eighth minute before scoring a solo goal just before half-time, which was said to be reminiscent of Salford co-owner Ryan Giggs and described as a "moment of brilliance".

He was released by Salford at the end of the 2021–22 season.

On 28 June 2022, Burgess joined recently relegated National League club Oldham Athletic on a two-year contract. On 23 March 2023, he completed a loan move to Altrincham until the end of the season. He was released by Oldham in July.

== Career statistics ==
As of match played 13 April 2021

Appearances and goals by club, season and competition
Club	Season	League			FA Cup		EFL Cup		Other		Total	
Club	Season	Division	Apps	Goals	Apps	Goals	Apps	Goals	Apps	Goals	Apps	Goals
Wigan Athletic	2017–18	League One	0	0	0	0	2	0	3 (Note: Appearances in the EFL Trophy)	0	5	0
Wigan Athletic	2017–18	Championship	0	0	0	0	0	0	0	0	0	0
Wigan Athletic	Total		0	0	0	0	2	0	3	0	5	0
Chorley (loan)	2017–18	National League North	1	0	0	0	—		2 (Note: Appearances in the Lancashire FA Challenge Trophy)	1	3	1
Barrow (loan)	2018–19	National League	25	1	1	1	—		1 (Note: Appearance in the FA Trophy)	0	27	2
Salford City	2019–20	League Two	0	0	0	0	0	0	0	0	0	0
Salford City	2020–21	League Two	14	3	0	0	0	0	2	0	16	3
Salford City	Total		14	3	0	0	0	0	2	0	16	3
Fylde (loan)	2020–21	National League	1	0	3	1	—		—		4	1
Career total			41	4	4	2	2	0	8	1	55	7

== Honours ==
Salford City

- EFL Trophy: 2019–20
