= Sam Fielding =

English association football player

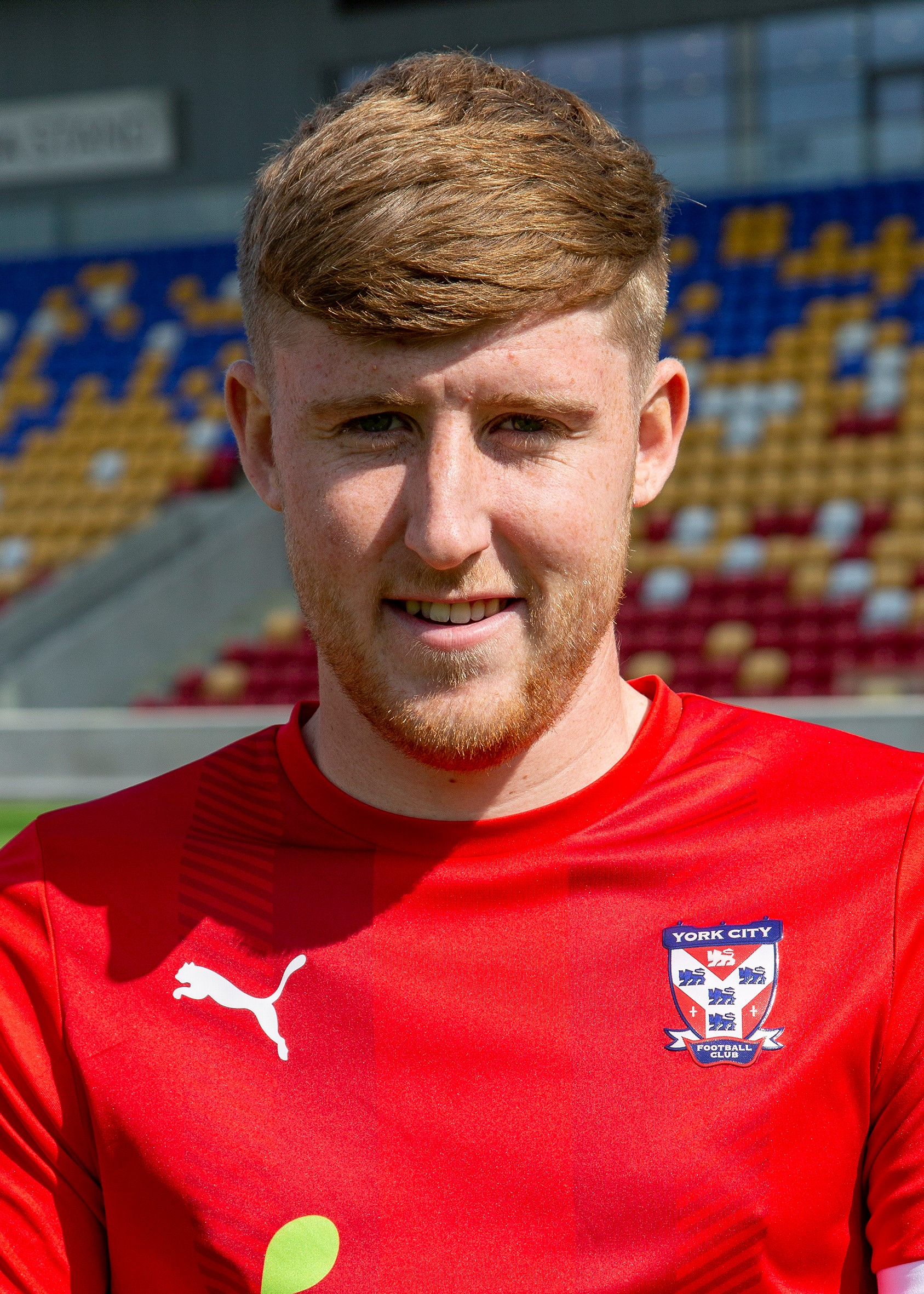
- Fielding with York City in 2021

Personal information
- Full name: Samuel Harry Fielding
- Date of birth: 2 November 1998 (age 28)
- Place of birth: York, England
- Position: Midfielder

Team information
- Current team: Chorley

Youth career
- –2016: York City

Senior career*
Years	Team	Apps	(Gls)
2016–2017	York City	1	(0)
2017–2020	Barnsley	0	(0)
2020–2021	Salford City	0	(0)
2021–2022	York City	9	(0)
2022–2023	Bradford (Park Avenue)	65	(3)
2023–2024	Spennymoor Town	27	(1)
2024	→ Hyde United (loan)	5	(0)
2024–2025	Farsley Celtic	26	(0)
2025–2026	Marine	53	(3)
2026–	Chorley	0	(0)
- * Club domestic league appearances and goals as of 16:50, 20 July 2026 (UTC)

Samuel Harry Fielding (born 2 November 1998) is an English footballer who plays as a midfielder for National League North club Chorley.

== Club career ==
Born in York, Fielding began his career with York City, and made his debut on 8 October 2016 against Braintree Town, playing 90 minutes in a 1–1 draw. He made a second appearance the following week in a FA Cup qualifying game against Curzon Ashton. He was praised for his mentality and described by the York Press as "one for the future", and was offered a new contract at the end of the season. but made the move to fellow Yorkshire side Barnsley. He signed a contract extension with Barnsley in 2019, but was released a year later.

He signed for EFL League Two side Salford City in September, and made his début for the club on 29 September in the EFL Trophy against Morecambe. He was an 85th-minute substitute for James Wilson as Salford City won 2–0. At the end of the 2020–21 season, it was announced that he would be leaving the club.

Following his release from Salford, he returned to National League North side York City, following a successful trial period.

On 22 January 2022, Fielding signed an 18-month contract with National League North side Bradford (Park Avenue).

Following Bradford (Park Avenue)'s relegation at the end of the 2022–23, Fielding remained in the National League North with Spennymoor Town. In March 2024, he joined Northern Premier League Premier Division club Hyde United on loan until the end of the season.

In June 2024, Fielding joined fellow National League North side Farsley Celtic following his departure from Spennymoor Town. He departed the club by mutual consent in February 2025. On 24 February, he joined Marine. He departed Marine at the end of the 2025–26 season.

In July 2026, Fielding joined National League North club Chorley.

== Career statistics ==
As of 23 February 2025

Appearances and goals by club, season and competition
Club	Season	League			FA Cup		EFL Cup		Other		Total	
Club	Season	Division	Apps	Goals	Apps	Goals	Apps	Goals	Apps	Goals	Apps	Goals
York City	2016–17	National League	1	0	1	0	—		0	0	2	0
Salford City	2020–21	League Two	0	0	1	0	0	0	3 (Note: Appearances in EFL Trophy)	0	4	0
York City	2021–22	National League North	9	0	4	0	—		1 (Note: Appearance(s) in FA Trophy)	0	14	0
Bradford (Park Avenue)	2021–22	National League North	20	1	—		—		0	0	20	1
Bradford (Park Avenue)	2022–23	National League North	45	2	1	0	—		1	0	47	2
Bradford (Park Avenue)	Total		65	3	1	0	0	0	1	0	67	3
Spennymoor Town	2023–24	National League North	27	1	2	0	—		1	0	30	1
Hyde United (loan)	2023–24	Northern Premier League Premier Division	5	0	0	0	—		0	0	5	0
Farsley Celtic	2024–25	National League North	26	0	1	0	—		1	0	28	0
Career total			133	4	10	0	0	0	7	0	150	4

== Honours ==
Salford City

- EFL Trophy: 2019–20
