= Liam Loughlan =

English footballer

Personal information
- Full name: Liam Loughlan
- Date of birth: 24 April 2002 (age 24)
- Place of birth: Leicester, England
- Position: Midfielder

Team information
- Current team: Long Eaton United

Youth career
- –2020: Leicester City

Senior career*
Years	Team	Apps	(Gls)
2020–2022	Salford City	3	(0)
2021	→ Farsley Celtic (loan)	5	(0)
2021	→ Ashton United (loan)	1	(0)
2023	Ilkeston Town	0	(0)
2024-	Long Eaton United	31	(8)
- * Club domestic league appearances and goals as of 17:58, 17 April 2022 (UTC)

Liam Loughlan (born 24 April 2002) is an English footballer who plays as a midfielder for Long Eaton United.

== Career ==
Loughlan was born in Leicester.

He started his career at the academy of Leicester City, playing for their under-18 team in the 2019–20 season. He joined Salford City's development squad during the summer of 2020, and made his competitive debut for the club on 9 September in a EFL Trophy game against Manchester United Under-21s. On 8 October 2021, he moved on loan to National League North team Farsley Celtic. He was released by Salford at the end of the 2021–22 season.

In October 2023, Loughlan signed for NPL Premier Division club Ilkeston Town.

In March 2024, he signed for Southern Premier League Central team Long Eaton United on dual registration. Loughlan made 7 appearances for The Blues, scoring 1 goal - in a 3–3 draw against St Ives Town.

In the summer of 2024, Loughlan made his switch to Long Eaton a permanent one, and has made himself a key figure for the club over the first half of the 24/25 season. On 4 January 2025, Loughlan scored twice in a 3–2 win at Quorn - the first double he has scored for the club.

== Career statistics ==
As of match played 19 March 2022

Appearances and goals by club, season and competition
Club	Season	League			FA Cup		League Cup		Other		Total	
Club	Season	Division	Apps	Goals	Apps	Goals	Apps	Goals	Apps	Goals	Apps	Goals
Salford City	2020–21	League Two	0	0	0	0	0	0	4 (Note: Appearances in EFL Trophy)	0	4	0
Salford City	2021–22	League Two	3	0	0	0	0	0	1 (Note: Appearances in EFL Trophy)	0	4	0
Salford City	Total		3	0	0	0	0	0	5	0	8	0
Farsley Celtic F.C. (loan)	2021–22	National League North	0	0	0	0	0	0	0	0	0	0
Long Eaton United	2024–25	Northern Premier League Division One Midlands	24	7	2	0	—		3	1	29	8
Career total			0	7	0	0	0	0	8	1	37	8

== Honours ==
Salford City

- EFL Trophy: 2019–20
