= Oscar Threlkeld =

English footballer (born 1994)

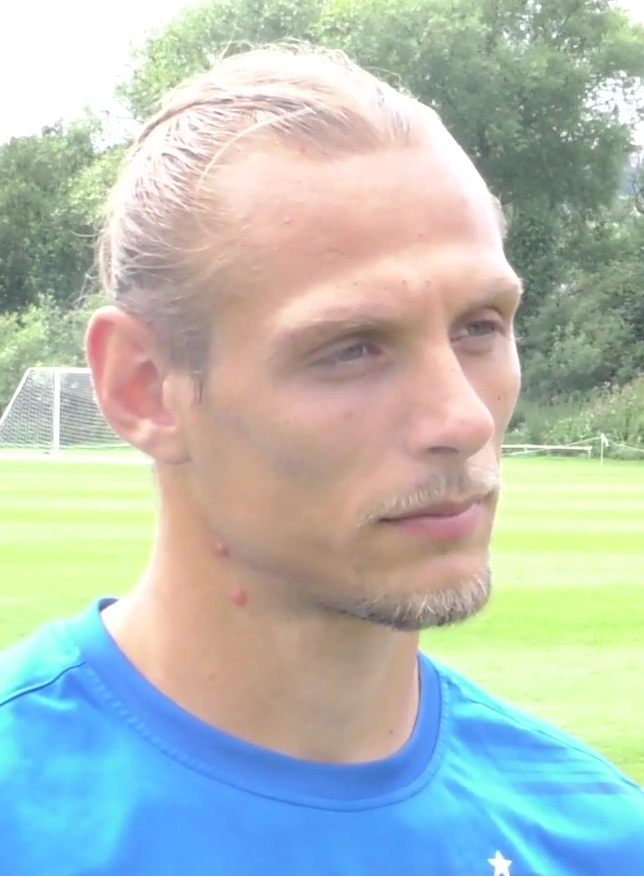
- Threlkeld in 2021

Personal information
- Full name: Oscar George Threlkeld
- Date of birth: 15 February 1994 (age 32)
- Place of birth: Radcliffe, Greater Manchester, England
- Positions: Defender; midfielder

Team information
- Current team: Bury

Youth career
- –2014: Bolton Wanderers

Senior career*
Years	Team	Apps	(Gls)
2014–2016	Bolton Wanderers	9	(0)
2015–2016	→ Plymouth Argyle (loan)	25	(1)
2016–2018	Plymouth Argyle	60	(2)
2018–2019	Waasland-Beveren	2	(0)
2019	→ Plymouth Argyle (loan)	12	(1)
2019–2021	Salford City	43	(0)
2021–2023	Bradford City	22	(0)
2022–2023	→ Oldham Athletic (loan)	7	(1)
2023–2024	Morecambe	2	(0)
2024–2025	Torquay United	47	(0)
2025–	Bury	26	(2)
- * Club domestic league appearances and goals as of 11:53, 19 September 2025 (UTC)

Oscar George Threlkeld (born 15 February 1994) is an English professional footballer who plays for Northern Premier League Division One West side Bury. Originally a centre-back, Threlkeld's versatility has also seen him play as a full-back and a defensive midfielder.

== Career ==
=== Bolton Wanderers ===
Threkleld came through Bolton Wanderers' academy and made his debut for the team on 26 April 2014 when he started in a 3–1 away win against Sheffield Wednesday. At the end of the 2015–16 season, the club confirmed that he would be leaving when his contract expired at the end of June.

=== Plymouth Argyle ===
On 27 August 2015, Threlkeld signed on loan for Plymouth Argyle until 2 January. He made his debut for the club as an 83rd-minute substitute in a 3–2 win at AFC Wimbledon in the Football League Trophy, replacing Gregg Wylde. He scored his first career goal in a 2–1 defeat in the Devon derby against Exeter City on 21 November 2015. Threlkeld's loan expired in January 2016, but was promptly extended until the end of the regular season. The terms of his loan meant he was unable to play for Argyle in the play-offs that season.

Threlkeld was released by Bolton and on 2 July 2016 he was signed on a permanent deal by Argyle. That season, Argyle won promotion from the EFL League Two as runners-up, with Threlkeld scoring two goals: in a 2–1 defeat away to Morecambe, and in a 2–0 win at home to Crawley Town.

In the 2017–18 season Threlkeld made 26 appearances as Argyle missed out on the League One play-offs by three points.

=== Waasland-Beveren ===
Threlkeld was offered a new contract by Plymouth Argyle at the end of the 2017–18 season, but he chose to reject the offer and sign a three-year deal with Belgian First Division A side Waasland-Beveren.

Threlkeld made his debut for Beveren on 3 August 2018 in a 0–0 draw with Standard Liège, where he received a booking in the 90+3rd minute.

==== Return to Argyle ====
On 8 January 2019, Threlkeld rejoined Plymouth Argyle on a temporary deal until the end of the season, with him set to return to Beveren once the season had ended.

=== Salford City ===
Threlkeld joined Salford City on 3 June 2019 on a two-year contract. He scored his first goal for Salford in an EFL Trophy tie against Tranmere Rovers on 12 November 2019. At the end of the 2020–21 season, it was announced that he would be leaving the club.

=== Bradford City ===
On 20 June 2021, Threlkeld agreed to join Bradford City upon the expiration of his Salford contract, officially joining the club on 1 July 2021.

He moved on loan to Oldham Athletic in August 2022.

In May 2023 it was announced that he would leave Bradford City when his contract expired on 30 June.

=== Morecambe ===
It was announced on 23 November 2023 that Threlkeld agreed to join Morecambe on a short-term deal until January.

=== Torquay United ===
On 4 June 2024, Threlkeld joined National League South side Torquay United on a one-year contract. He had captained the club in 2024/25, but on 2 June 2025, Threlkeld left the club by mutual consent.

=== Bury ===
In September 2025, Threlkeld joined Northern Premier League Division One West side Bury.

== Career statistics ==
As of end of 2024–25 season

Appearances and goals by club, season and competition
Club	Season	League			National cup		League cup		Other		Total	
Club	Season	Division	Apps	Goals	Apps	Goals	Apps	Goals	Apps	Goals	Apps	Goals
Bolton Wanderers	2013–14	Championship	2	0	0	0	0	0	0	0	2	0
Bolton Wanderers	2014–15	Championship	4	0	0	0	2	0	0	0	6	0
Bolton Wanderers	2015–16	Championship	3	0	0	0	0	0	0	0	3	0
Bolton Wanderers	Total		9	0	0	0	2	0	0	0	11	0
Plymouth Argyle (loan)	2015–16	League Two	25	1	1	0	0	0	2 (Note: Appearance(s) in EFL Trophy)	0	28	1
Plymouth Argyle	2016–17	League Two	36	2	4	0	1	0	1	0	42	2
Plymouth Argyle	2017–18	League One	24	0	0	0	1	0	1	0	26	0
Plymouth Argyle	Total		60	2	4	0	2	0	2	0	68	2
Waasland-Beveren	2018–19	Pro League	2	0	0	0	0	0	0	0	2	0
Plymouth Argyle (loan)	2018–19	League One	12	1	0	0	0	0	0	0	12	1
Salford City	2019–20	League Two	18	0	2	0	1	0	7	1	28	1
Salford City	2020–21	League Two	35	0	2	0	2	0	1	0	40	0
Salford City	Total		53	0	4	0	3	0	8	1	68	1
Bradford City	2021–22	League Two	22	0	2	0	0	0	3	0	27	0
Bradford City	2022–23	League Two	0	0	0	0	0	0	0	0	0	0
Bradford City	Total		22	0	2	0	0	0	3	0	27	0
Oldham Athletic (loan)	2022–23	National League	8	1	0	0	–		–		8	1
Morecambe	2023–24	League Two	2	0	1	0	0	0	0	0	3	0
Torquay United	2024–25	National League South	38	0	0	0	0	0	1 (Note: Appearance in National League South play-off)	0	39	0
Career total			241	5	12	0	7	0	16	1	266	6

== Honours ==
Plymouth Argyle

- EFL League Two runner-up: 2016–17

Salford City

- EFL Trophy: 2019–20
