= 2025–26 Bury F.C. season =

Bury
2025–26 season
- Chairman: Gareth Castick
- Manager: Dave McNabb (until 2 December 2025); Tim Lees (caretaker) (17 December to 11 February 2026); Anthony Johnson (from 11 February 2026)
- Stadium: Gigg Lane
- NPL West: 1st
- FA Cup: Preliminary round
- FA Trophy: Second Round Qualifying
- Manchester Premier Cup: Quarter-final
- Top goalscorer: League: Kai Evans (16 Goals); All: Kai Evans (18 Goals)
- Highest home attendance: 7,052 vs Witton Albion (18 April 2026); NPL West
- Lowest home attendance: 1,751 vs Wythenshawe Town (6 September 2025); FA Trophy
- Average home league attendance: 3,698
- Biggest win: 9–0 vs Trafford (H), 7 February 2026
- Biggest defeat: 0–7 vs Runcorn Linnets (A), 4 October 2025, FA Trophy
- All statistics correct as of 15 November 2025.

The 2025–26 season is Bury F.C.'s first in the Northern Premier League West Division, following their promotion the previous season.

== Transfers and contracts ==
=== In ===
Date from	Position	Nationality	Name	From	Fee	Ref.
13 May 2025	CB	(England)	Scott Duxbury	(England) Radcliffe	Free	
13 May 2025	AM	(England)	Callum Spooner	(England) Hyde United	Free	
27 May 2025	AM	(England)	Owen Robinson	(England) Marine	Undisclosed Compensation Fee	
7 June 2025	FB	(England)	Kieran Lloyd	(Wales) Bala Town	Free	
8 June 2025	CM	(England)	Kieran Glynn	(England) Hereford	Free	
17 June 2025	ST	(England)	Kai Evans	(England) Nantwich Town	Undisclosed Fee	
17 July 2025	CF	(England)	Gabriel Johnson	(England) Guiseley	Free	
22 July 2025	CB	(England)	Louis Isherwood	(England) Widnes	Free	
31 July 2025	W	(England)	Ryan Atkinson	(England) Chester	NA	
4 September 2025	W	(England)	Gavin Massey	(England) AFC Fylde	NA	
12 September 2025	DF	(England)	Reece Kendall	(England) Cleethorpes Town	NA	
18 September 2025	CB	(England)	Oscar Threlkeld	(England) Torquay United	NA	
10 October 2025	CB	(England)	James Neild	(England) Warrington Rylands	NA	
10 October 2025	AM	(England)	Owen Barker	(England) Everton	NA	
20 December 2025	CB	(Malta)	Luke Tabone	(England) Southport	NA	
23 December 2025	DF	(England)	Bailey Sloane	(England) Marine	NA	
31 December 2025	ST	(England)	Lewis Rawsthorn	(England) Radcliffe	NA	
8 January 2026	FW	(Wales)	Momodou Touray	(England) Southport	NA	
22 January 2026	FW	(England)	Joe Piggott	(England) Atherton Collieries	NA	
23 January 2026	CB	(Democratic Republic of the Congo)	Toto Nsiala	(England) Shrewsbury Town	NA	
18 February 2026	AM	(England)	Luca Navarro	(England) Ashton United	NA	
25 February 2026	WI	(England)	Veron Parny	(England) Clitheroe	NA	
20 March 2026	AM	(England)	Jordan Lazenbury	(England) West Didsbury & Chorlton	NA	
26 March 2026	CM	(England)	Louis White	(England) Ashton United	NA	
26 March 2026	FW	(England)	Tom Carr	(England) Chorley	NA	

=== Out ===
Date from	Position	Nationality	Name	Reason	To	Fee	Ref.
17 June 2025	FW	(Republic of Ireland)	Bryan Ly	Transfer	(England) Wythenshawe	Undisclosed Fee	
12 September 2025	FB	(England)	Kieran Lloyd	Transfer	(England) Hyde United	Free	
10 October 2025	CM	(England)	Aaron Chalmers	Transfer	(England) Wythenshawe	Free	
18 November 2025	CF	(England)	Gabriel Johnson	Transfer	(England) Emley AFC	Free	
12 December 2025	CM	(England)	Josh Gregory	Left	NA	NA	
16 December 2025	DF	(England)	Reece Kendall	Transfer	(England) Tadcaster Albion	Free	
26 December 2025	DF	(England)	Kieran Glynn	Mutual Departure		NA	
20 March 2026	FW	(England)	Joe Piggott	Mutual Departure		NA	

=== Loaned in ===
Date from	Position	Nationality	Name	From	Date Until	Ref.
22 August 2025	MF	(England)	Regan Riley	(England) Radcliffe	End of Season	
21 November 2025	AM	(England)	Leo Graham	(England) Wigan Athletic	9 March 2026	
20 December 2025	CB	(Malta)	Luke Tabone	(England) Southport	January 17, 2026 28 day loan	

=== Loaned out ===
Date from	Position	Nationality	Name	To	Date until	Ref.
31 July 2025	W	(England)	Ryan Atkinson	(England) Northwich Victoria	Unknown	
23 August 2025	CM	(England)	Brad Carroll	(England) Clitheroe	20 September 2025	
16 October 2025	CB	(England)	Scott Duxbury	(England) Hyde United	November 13, 2025	
17 October 2025	AM	(England)	Tyler James	(England) Padiham	Unknown	
8 January 2026	ST	(England)	Djavan Pedro	(England) Southport	25 February 2026	
27 January 2026	CB	(England)	Scott Duxbury	(England) Hyde United	End of Season	
2 March 2026	CB	(England)	Aiden Walker	(England) Hednesford Town	30 March 2026	
26 March 2026	CM	(England)	Regan Riley	(England) Stafford Rangers	26 August 2026	

=== Released / Out of Contract ===
Date	Position	Nationality	Name	Subsequent Club	Join Date	Ref.
15 April 2025	MF	(England)	Nicky Adams	NA	NA	
4 May 2025	DF	(England)	Will Calligan	(England) Wythenshawe	July 1, 2025	
4 May 2025	FW	(England)	Ruben Jerome	(England) Stalybridge Celtic	July 1, 2025	
4 May 2025	DF	(England)	Reece Kendall	(England) Cleethorpes Town	July 1, 2025	
4 May 2025	MF	(England)	Sam Coughlan	(United States) Saint Louis Billikens	August 1, 2025	
4 May 2025	FW	(England)	Lewis-Simon Byrne	NA	NA	
4 May 2025	FW	(England)	Morgan Homson-Smith	(United Arab Emirates) Dubai Irish	NA	
4 May 2025	FW	(England)	Louis Jeanne		NA	
4 May 2025	DF	(England)	Courtney Meppen-Walters	NA	NA	
4 May 2025	DF	(England)	Gareth Peet	NA	NA	

== Pre-season and friendlies ==
Win Draw Loss Fixtures

5 July 2025	Atherton L.R.	1–1	Bury	Atherton
14:00 BST	Hunter 19'	Report	Evans 77'	Stadium: Crilly Park; Attendance: 530

12 July 2025	Bury	3–1	Chester	Bury
15:00 BST	Pedro 13', 51' (pen.); Trialist B 76'	Report	Mottley-Henry 47'	Stadium: Gigg Lane; Attendance: 1,678

15 July 2025	Bury	2–1	Ashton Athletic	Bury
19:45 BST	James 10'; Pye 75'	Report	Nicholson 19' (pen.)	Stadium: Gigg Lane; Attendance: 667

19 July 2025	Buxton	1–1	Bury	Buxton
15:00 BST	Campbell 41'	Report	Glynn 35'; Pedro (yellow card) 52'; Chalmers (yellow card) 52'; Duxbury (yellow card) 61'	Stadium: Silverlands; Attendance: 669

22 July 2025	Bury	9–3	Cheadle Town	Bury
19:45 BST	Robinson 8', 32', 34'; Pedro 26', 44' (pen.), 54', 65' (yellow card) 87'; James 49'; Duxbury 54'	Report	Njie 24', 62'; Morton 74'	Stadium: Gigg Lane; Attendance: 596

26 July 2025	Radcliffe	3–2	Bury	Radcliffe
15:00 BST	Hulme 27', 82', 89'	Report	Pedro 32', 53'	Stadium: Stainton Park; Attendance: 1,702

29 July 2025	Bury	3–1	Wigan Athletic XI	Bury
19:45 BST	James 16', 53', 69'	Report	Graham 29'	Stadium: Gigg Lane; Attendance: 1,249

== Competitions ==
=== Overall record ===
Competition	First match	Last match	Starting round	Final position	Record							
Competition	First match	Last match	Starting round	Final position	Pld	W	D	L	GF	GA	GD	Win %
NPL West	9 August 2025	25 April 2026	Matchday 1	Winners	42	27	9	6	86	36	+50	64.29
FA Cup	2 August 2025	19 August 2025	Extra Preliminary	Preliminary Replay	3	1	1	1	7	3	+4	33.33
FA Trophy	6 September 2025	4 October 2025	First Round Qualifying	Second Round Qualifying	2	1	0	1	2	8	−6	50.00
Manchester Cup	24 November 2025	13 January 2026	First Round	Second Round	2	1	0	1	5	4	+1	50.00
Total					49	30	10	9	100	51	+49	61.22

Source: Competitions

=== Northern Premier League Division One West ===
==== League table ====
Pos	Team	Pld	W	D	L	GF	GA	GD	Pts	Promotion, qualification or relegation
1	Bury (C, P)	42	27	9	6	86	36	+50	90	Promotion to the Premier Division
2	Avro (O, P)	42	27	7	8	94	41	+53	88	Qualification for the play-offs
3	Stalybridge Celtic	42	25	7	10	88	55	+33	82	Qualification for the play-offs
4	Runcorn Linnets	42	23	11	8	76	45	+31	80	Qualification for the play-offs
5	Lower Breck	42	22	9	11	88	62	+26	75	Qualification for the play-offs

Source: NPL official site
Rules for classification: 1) points; 2) goal difference; 3) number of goals scored; 4) number of matches won; 5) head-to-head results
(C) Champions; (O) Play-off winners; (P) Promoted

==== Matches ====
Win Draw Loss Fixtures

9 August 2025 1	Bury	1–0	Newcastle Town	Bury
15:00 BST	Walker 87'; Fogerty (yellow card) 90+6'	Report	Lawson (yellow card) 42'; Matthews (yellow card) 90+3'; Cadeau (yellow card) 90+4'; Earley (yellow card) 90+5'	Stadium: Gigg Lane; Attendance: 3,631

13 August 2025 2	Avro	1–1	Bury	Oldham
19:45 BST	Djankpata 30'; Maphosa (yellow card) 75'	Report	Isherwood 42'; Duxbury (yellow card) 77'; Stepans (yellow card) 88'	Stadium: Whitebank Stadium; Attendance: 1,320

23 August 2025 3	Congleton Town	0–0	Bury	Congleton
15:00 BST	Hartshorn (yellow card) 17'	Report	Riley (yellow card) 30'	Stadium: Cleric Stadium; Attendance: 910; Referee: Daniel Hitchell

25 August 2025 4	Bury	0–2	Stalybridge Celtic	Bury
15:00 BST	Gregory (yellow card) 46'; Johnson (yellow card) 67'; Riley (yellow card) 75'	Report	Newell 42' (yellow card) 71'; Jerome 45+2'; Scarisbrick (red card) 59'; Johnson (yellow card) 82'	Stadium: Gigg Lane; Attendance: 3,299

9 September 2025 5	Bury	1–0	Runcorn Linnets	Bury
19:45 BST	Isherwood (yellow card) 16'; Stepans 53'; Walker (yellow card) 90'	Report	Foulds (yellow card) 20'; Rosenblatt (yellow card) 47'; Wylie (yellow card) 69'; Rain (yellow card) 80'; Brooke (yellow card) 90+4'	Stadium: Gigg Lane; Attendance: 2,908
Note: Originally scheduled for 19 August 2025. Postponed due to Bury's FA Cup schedule.

13 September 2025 6	Bury	3–0	Shifnal Town	Bury
15:00 BST	Pye (yellow card) 51'; Pedro 57'; Stepans 80'; James 90+4'	Report		Stadium: Gigg Lane; Attendance: 3,104

27 September 2025 7	Bury	3–2	Stafford Rangers	Bury
15:00 BST	Evans 51'; Johnson 67'; Stepans (yellow card) 90' (goal) 90+2'	Report	Birch 20'; Fallon (yellow card) 24'; Cockerline 60'; O'Neil (yellow card) 73'; Sherratt (yellow card) 90+7'	Stadium: Gigg Lane; Attendance: 3,509

7 October 2025 8	Trafford	0–1	Bury	Flixton
19:45 BST	Jones (yellow card) 3'; Molloy (yellow card) 67'	Report	Glynn 48' (pen.); Fogerty (yellow card) 60'; Pedro (yellow card) 66'	Stadium: Shawe View Stadium; Attendance: 1,176

11 October 2025 9	Bury	4–0	Chasetown	Bury
15:00 BST	Massey 9'; Evans 19', 33'; Pedro 26' (yellow card); Kendall (yellow card) 90+2'	Report	Evans (yellow card) 46'; Butlin (yellow card) 60'	Stadium: Gigg Lane; Attendance: 3,407

14 October 2025 10	Bury	5–2	Wythenshawe Town	Bury
19:45 BST	Pedro 6', 30', 33'; Threlkeld (yellow card); Stepans 10', 54'; Kendall (yellow card) 73'	Report	Taylor (yellow card) 15'; Hewitson (yellow card) 45+1'; Woods 74'; Nixon 79'	Stadium: Gigg Lane; Attendance: 2,742

18 October 2025 11	Sporting Khalsa	2–0	Bury	Willenhall
15:00 BST	Kourouiyanni 25'; Landell 90+5'	Report	Pye (yellow card) 58'; Pedro (yellow card) 89'	Stadium: Aspray Arena; Attendance: 785

21 October 2025 12	Mossley	2–1	Bury	Mossley
15:00 BST	Fawns 20'; Graham (yellow card) 36'; Mugalula 50'	Report	Pedro (yellow card) 55'; Isherwood 66'; Neild (yellow card) 88'	Stadium: Seel Park; Attendance: 1,032
Note: Match was originally set to be played 20 September 2025, but was postponed due to Bury's FA Trophy schedule.

25 October 2025 13	Vauxhall Motors	3–3	Bury	Ellesmere Port
15:00 BST	Sambor 2'; Jebrin (yellow card) 31'; Rushton 33'; Deer 69'	Report	James 6', 88'; Pedro 67' (pen.)	Stadium: Rivacre Park; Attendance: 939

1 November 2025 14	Bury	2–0	Kidsgrove Athletic	Bury
15:00 GMT	James 57'; Evans 64'			Stadium: Gigg Lane; Attendance: 3,055

8 November 2025 15	Bootle	1–1	Bury	Bootle
15:00 GMT	Hodkinson (yellow card) 16' (goal) 45+2'; Roberts (yellow card) 49'		Riley (yellow card) 31'; Pedro 54'	Stadium: New Bucks Park; Attendance: 920

11 November 2025 16	Nantwich Town	1–4	Bury	Nantwich
19:45 BST	Saunders 79'	Report	Stepans 10', 41'; Pedro (yellow card) 32'; Evans 52', 74'; Barker (yellow card) 90'	Stadium: Weaver Stadium; Attendance: 1,045
Note: Originally scheduled for 30 September 2025. Postponed due to Bury's FA Trophy schedule

15 November 2025 17	Bury	0–2	Lower Breck	Bury
15:00 GMT	Stepans (yellow card) 73'		(yellow card) 48'; Cherera 75'; Hughes 80'	Stadium: Gigg Lane; Attendance: 3,883

19 November 2025 18	Darlaston Town	1–2	Bury	Darlaston
19:45 BST	Pearson 24'; Corns (yellow card) 62'; Foreshaw (yellow card) 83'; Spragg (yellow card) 90+6'	Report	James (yellow card) 3'; Threlkeld 45+3' (yellow card) 85'; Gomes (yellow card) 50'; Evans 60'; Gregory (yellow card) 85'	Stadium: Bentley Sports Pavilion; Attendance: 364
Note: Match was originally going to be played 4 October 2025 but was postponed to 19 November 2025.

22 November 2025 19	Witton Albion	3–0	Bury	Northwich
15:00 GMT	Duckworth 45+3' (yellow card) 50'; Garbutt 54'; Brazel (yellow card) 58'; Kelly (red card) 66'; Leta 79'	Report	Carroll (yellow card) 49'	Stadium: Wincham Park; Attendance: 945

29 November 2025 20	Bury	0–0	Atherton Collieries	Bury
15:00 GMT	Pedro (yellow card) 90+4'			Stadium: Gigg Lane; Attendance: 3,000

13 December 2025 21	Bury	2–1	Mossley	Bury
15:00 GMT	Lees 9' (o.g.); Graham (yellow card) 72'; Massey 75'		Stringer 24' (yellow card) 65'	Stadium: Gigg Lane; Attendance: 3,030

20 December 2025 22	Newcastle Town	0–1	Bury	Newcastle-under-Lyme
15:00 GMT	Jones (yellow card) 89'		Stepans 22' (pen.); Pedro (yellow card) 40'; Carroll (yellow card) 51'	Stadium: Lyme Valley Stadium; Attendance: 762

26 December 2025 23	Bury	2–0	Clitheroe	Bury
15:00 GMT	Gomes (yellow card) 34'; Stepans 42' (pen.); Pedro (yellow card) 55'; Graham 57'			Stadium: Gigg Lane; Attendance: 5,337

1 January 2026 24	Stalybridge Celtic	2–6	Bury	Stalybridge
15:00 GMT	Chalmers (yellow card) 48'; Leonard 59'; Byrne (yellow card) 74'; Monks (yellow card) 75'; Horan 83'; Doyle (yellow card) 90+5'		Evans 2', 27', 72' (pen.); Rawsthorn 18'; Robinson 21'; Graham 77' (pen.)	Stadium: Bower Fold; Attendance: 2,114

10 January 2026 25	Bury	1–1	Avro	Bury
15:00 GMT	Rawsthorn 21'; Tabone (yellow card) 22'; Spooner (yellow card) 67'	Report	Modi (yellow card) 19'; Fitzpatrick 63' (pen.)	Stadium: Gigg Lane; Attendance: 3,739

17 January 2026 26	Bury	2–2	Darlaston Town	Bury
15:00 GMT	Rawsthorn 10'; Sloane (yellow card) 45+3'; Foggerty (yellow card) 45+3'; Touray 59'; Carroll (yellow card) 86'; Neild (yellow card) 90+8'; Isherwood (red card) 90+8'		Knowles 22'; Cook (yellow card) 33' (yellow-red card) 90+8'; Foreshaw (yellow card) 55'; Pearson (yellow card) 74'; Gill 62' (yellow card) 77' (red card) 90+8'; Chesterton (yellow card) 90'	Stadium: Gigg Lane; Attendance: 3,039

24 January 2026 27	Stafford Rangers	2–2	Bury	Stafford
15:00 GMT	Birch 27'; Flowers (yellow card) 39'; Burns (yellow card) 85'; Anderson 90+2'		Touray (yellow card) 35' (goal) 89'; Sloane 54'	Stadium: Marston Road; Attendance: 1,521

31 January 2026 28	Chasetown	0–1	Bury	Chasetown
15:00 GMT	Clarke (yellow card) 44'		Graham 33'; Carroll (yellow card) 66'	Stadium: The Scholars Ground; Attendance: 936

7 February 2026 29	Bury	9–0	Trafford	Bury
15:00 GMT	Sloane 9', 22', 40'; Evans 15', 76'; Graham 28' (pen.); Robinson 45+4'; Touray 48', 55'		Opawole (red card) 7'; Sloan (yellow card) 32'	Stadium: Gigg Lane; Attendance: 3,236

14 February 2026 30	Wythenshawe Town	0–1	Bury	Wythenshawe
15:00 GMT	Rhodes (yellow card) 27'; McWilliams (yellow card) 73'		Evans 17'; Gomes (yellow card) 31'; Stepans (yellow card) 81'	Stadium: Ericstan Park; Attendance: 1,075

18 February 2026 31	Shifnal Town	0–2	Bury	Shifnal
19:45 GMT	Jarman (yellow card) 58'; Monteiro (yellow card) 63'; Hall (yellow card) 90+1'		Carroll (yellow card) 45'; Touray (yellow card) 59'; Sloane 61'; Stepans 76'; Fogerty (yellow card) 90'	Stadium: Phoenix Park; Attendance: 549
Note: Originally scheduled for 6 December 2025 but match was postponed due to a frozen pitch. Was rescheduled for 3 January 2026 but was again postponed due to a frozen pitch.

21 February 2026 32	Bury	2–0	Sporting Khalsa	Bury
15:00 GMT	Stepans 8'; Touray 41'		Gill (yellow card) 78'	Stadium: Gigg Lane; Attendance: 3,486

27 February 2026 33	Lower Breck	0–3	Bury	Anfield
19:45 GMT	Burns (yellow card) 12'; Millington (yellow card) 16'; Cookson (yellow card) 68'; Barrow (yellow card) 80'		Evans (yellow card) 12'; Neild (yellow card) 42'; Touray 58' (yellow card) 71'; Pedro 66'; Carroll (yellow card) 69'; Rawsthorn 90+3'; Allen (yellow card) 90+3'	Stadium: Anfield Sports and Community Centre; Attendance: 1,286

7 March 2026 34	Bury	0–2	Vauxhall Motors	Bury
15:00 GMT	Evans (yellow card) 90+4'		Solomon-Davies (yellow card) 14'; Rushton 21'; Grogan (yellow card) 36'; Ellison 53'	Stadium: Gigg Lane; Attendance: 3,772

14 March 2026 35	Kidsgrove Athletic	0–2	Bury	Kidsgrove
15:00 GMT	Howse (yellow card) 19'; Hardeman (yellow card) 62'; Falding (yellow card) 68'		Evans 5'; Touray 69' (pen.); Sloane (yellow card) 87'	Stadium: Hollinwood Road; Attendance: 1,952

21 March 2026 36	Bury	2–1	Bootle	Bury
15:00 GMT	Evans 44'; Touray 53'; Fogerty (yellow card) 64'; Gomes (yellow card) 88'		Roberts (yellow card) 34'; Hodkinson 57'	Stadium: Gigg Lane; Attendance: 3,685

28 March 2026 37	Runcorn Linnets	0–3	Bury	Runcorn
15:00 GMT	Welsh (yellow card) 6' (yellow-red card) 88'; Arsan (yellow card) 45+2'; Mersin (yellow card) 46'; Rain (yellow card) 78'		Lazenbury 10'; Stepans (yellow card) 18'; Touray 21'; Gomes 26'	Stadium: Millbank Linnets Stadium; Attendance: 1,570

3 April 2026 38	Bury	4–1	Congleton Town	Bury
15:00 BST	Stepans (yellow card) 35'; Navarro 73', 75'; Rawsthorn 80', 84'		McCarthy 8'; Williams (yellow card) 69'	Stadium: Gigg Lane; Attendance: 4,790

6 April 2026 39	Clitheroe	1–1	Bury	Clitheroe
15:00 BST	Briggs 53'; McConville (yellow card) 88'		Evans 90+2'	Stadium: Shawbridge; Attendance: 2,375

11 April 2026 40	Bury	1–0	Nantwich Town	Bury
15:00 BST	Touray (yellow card) 36'; Evans (yellow card) 46'; Carr 58'			Stadium: Gigg Lane; Attendance: 3,948

18 April 2026 41	Bury	4–1	Witton Albion	Bury
15:00 BST	White (yellow card) 15'; Robinson 31'; Neild 41'; Evans (yellow card) 52'; Stepans 65'; Threlkeld 90+5'		Leta 17'; Edwards (yellow card) 38'; Lawrie (yellow card) 86'	Stadium: Gigg Lane; Attendance: 7,052

25 April 2026 42	Atherton Collieries	0–3	Bury	Atherton
15:00 BST	Nock (red card) 28'		Isherwood 9'; Threlkeld 53'; Pedro 90+1'	Stadium: Alder House; Attendance: 1,950

=== FA Cup ===
Win Draw Loss Fixtures

2 August 2025 Extra Preliminary	Bury	6–0	South Liverpool	Bury
15:00 BST	James 10', 13'; Pedro 26' (pen.), 57'; Pye 39'; Evans (yellow card) 81' (goal) 86'	Report		Stadium: Gigg Lane; Attendance: 1,873

16 August 2025 Preliminary	Stalybridge Celtic	1–1	Bury	Stalybridge
15:00 BST	Irlam 47'	Report	Pedro (yellow card) 18'; Evans 26'; Gomes (yellow card) 44'	Stadium: Bower Fold; Attendance: 1,525

19 August 2025 Preliminary Replay	Bury	0–2	Stalybridge Celtic	Bury
15:00 BST	Pedro (yellow card) 36'; Walker (yellow card) 65' (yellow-red card) 88'	Report	Jerome 44'; Scarisbrick (yellow card) 65'; Smales-Braithwaite 90+2'	Stadium: Gigg Lane; Attendance: 1,973

=== FA Trophy ===
Win Draw Loss Fixtures

6 September 2025 First Round Qualifying	Bury	Void; 3–1	Wythenshawe Town	Bury
15:00 BST	Gabriel 4', 16'; Evans 21'	Report	49'; Hart (yellow card) 51'; Matthews (yellow card) 83'	Stadium: Gigg Lane; Attendance: 1,751
Note: Match was voided and replayed because Bury fielded an ineligible player. Original match ended 3–1 to Bury.

16 September 2025 First Round Qualifying Replay	Wythenshawe Town	1–2	Bury	Wythenshawe
19:45 BST	Rhami 32'; (yellow card) 90+2'	Report	Gregory 5'; Evans (yellow card); Pye (yellow card) 28'; Riley (yellow card) 55'; Pedro 90+3'	Stadium: Ericstan Park; Attendance: 347

20 September 2025 Second Round Qualifying	Runcorn Linnets	Abandoned; 1–1	Bury	Runcorn
15:00 BST	Bakkor 7'		Pedro 17'	Stadium: APEC Taxis Stadium; Attendance: 1,005
Note: Match abandoned due to pitch conditions. Score was 1–1 at time of abandonment. Match was rescheduled.

4 October 2025 Second Round Qualifying	Runcorn Linnets	7–0	Bury	Runcorn
15:00 BST	Arsan 28' (pen.); Rosenblatt 44', 86'; Grady 47'; Crane 50', 90+1' (pen.); Dwyer (yellow card) 67'; Rooney 70'; Foulds (yellow card) 74'	Report	Gaulton (yellow card); Hopkins (yellow card) 57'; Hayhurst (yellow card) 82'	Stadium: APEC Taxis Stadium; Attendance: 825

=== Manchester Premier Cup ===
24 November 2025 First Round	Maine Road	2–4	Bury	Chorlton-cum-Hardy
19:45 BST	Sali (yellow card) 34'; Schofield 90+1', 90+4'	Report	James 5', 57'; McCullion 28'; Johnrose 48'; Carroll (yellow card) 90'	Stadium: Brantingham Road; Attendance: 240

13 January 2026 Quarter-final	Curzon Ashton	2–1	Bury	Ashton-under-Lyne
19:45 BST	Weston 61'; Darby 87'	Report	Touray 44'	Stadium: Tameside Stadium; Referee: Jack Churchill

== Squad statistics ==
=== Appearances and goals ===
As of 25 April 2026

No.	Pos	Nat	Player	Total		NPL West		FA Cup		FA Trophy		Manchester Cup	
No.	Pos	Nat	Player	Apps	Goals	Apps	Goals	Apps	Goals	Apps	Goals	Apps	Goals
1	GK	(England) ENG	Mitch Allen	47	0	42+0	0	3+0	0	1+1	0	0+0	0
	GK	(England) ENG	Samuel Grady	1	0	0+0	0	0+0	0	1+0	0	0+0	0
	GK	(England) ENG	Russell Saunders	4	0	0+0	0	0+0	0	2+0	0	2+0	0
5	DF	(England) ENG	Aaron Chalmers	7	0	3+1	0	1+1	0	1+0	0	0+0	0
	DF	(England) ENG	Aiden Walker	11	1	7+1	1	3+0	0	0+0	0	0+0	0
3	DF	(England) ENG	Connor Pye	27	1	13+9	0	3+0	1	2+0	0	0+0	0
	DF	(England) ENG	Scott Duxbury	8	0	5+1	0	2+0	0	0+0	0	0+0	0
	DF	(England) ENG	Kieran Lloyd	2	0	1+0	0	0+0	0	0+1	0	0+0	0
4	DF	(England) ENG	James Neild	30	0	28+1	0	0+0	0	0+0	0	0+1	0
	DF	(England) ENG	Reece Kendall	11	0	6+4	0	0+0	0	1+0	0	0+0	0
	DF	(Malta) MLT	Luke Tabone	5	0	4+0	0	0+0	0	0+0	0	1+0	0
	DF	(England) ENG	Bailey Sloane	15	5	13+1	5	0+0	0	0+0	0	1+0	0
5	DF	(England) ENG	Louis Isherwood	41	3	33+3	3	2+0	0	2+0	0	1+0	0
2	MF	(Portugal) POR	Bebeto Gomes	45	1	34+6	1	2+1	0	2+0	0	0+0	0
	MF	(England) ENG	Bobby Carroll	38	0	23+8	0	2+1	0	2+1	0	1+0	0
	MF	(England) ENG	Brad Carroll	1	0	0+0	0	0+1	0	0+0	0	0+0	0
	MF	(England) ENG	Leo Graham	17	3	15+1	3	0+0	0	0+0	0	0+1	0
	MF	(England) ENG	Jordan Lazenbury	1	1	1+0	1	0+0	0	0+0	0	0+0	0
	MF	(England) ENG	Louis White	6	0	6+0	0	0+0	0	0+0	0	0+0	0
	MF	(England) ENG	Josh Gregory	22	1	6+9	0	0+3	0	3+0	1	1+0	0
	MF	(England) ENG	Luca Navarro	11	2	2+9	2	0+0	0	0+0	0	0+0	0
	MF	(England) ENG	Callum Spooner	17	0	7+7	0	2+0	0	0+0	0	1+0	0
6	MF	(England) ENG	Cameron Fogerty	37	0	22+9	0	3+0	0	2+0	0	1+0	0
	MF	(England) ENG	Owen Robinson	18	3	13+5	3	0+0	0	0+0	0	0+0	0
	MF	(England) ENG	Regan Riley	27	0	11+12	0	0+0	0	2+1	0	1+0	0
	MF	(England) ENG	Owen Barker	8	0	1+7	0	0+0	0	0+0	0	0+0	0
	MF	(England) ENG	Jordan Lazenbury	4	0	2+2	0	0+0	0	0+0	0	0+0	0
	DF	(England) ENG	Oscar Threlkeld	26	3	22+3	3	0+0	0	1+0	0	0+0	0
	DF	(Democratic Republic of the Congo) COD	Toto Nsiala	2	0	0+2	0	0+0	0	0+0	0	0+0	0
	MF	(England) ENG	Ryan Atkinson	3	0	0+1	0	0+0	0	1+0	0	1+0	0
	MF	(England) ENG	Josh Ashe	1	0	0+0	0	0+0	0	0+0	0	1+0	0
	FW	(England) ENG	Gavin Massey	12	2	6+4	2	0+0	0	1+1	0	0+0	0
9	FW	(England) ENG	Djavan Pedro	33	13	21+6	9	3+0	2	2+1	2	0+0	0
	FW	(Latvia) LVA	Rustam Stepans	44	12	29+10	12	2+1	0	1+0	0	1+0	0
	FW	(England) ENG	Lewis Rawsthorn	12	6	5+7	6	0+0	0	0+0	0	0+0	0
9	FW	(Wales) WAL	Momodou Touray	18	9	16+1	8	0+0	0	0+0	0	1+0	1
	FW	(England) ENG	Joe Piggott	6	0	4+2	0	0+0	0	0+0	0	0+0	0
	FW	(England) ENG	Veron Parny	2	0	1+1	0	0+0	0	0+0	0	0+0	0
	FW	(England) ENG	Tom Carr	6	1	6+0	1	0+0	0	0+0	0	0+0	0
	FW	(England) ENG	Tyler James	23	8	5+11	4	1+2	2	2+1	0	1+0	2
10	FW	(England) ENG	Kieran Glynn	23	1	13+5	1	0+2	0	2+1	0	0+0	0
10	FW	(Wales) WAL	Kai Evans	47	19	33+8	16	3+0	2	1+1	1	1+0	0
	FW	(England) ENG	Gabriel Johnson	16	3	4+8	1	2+1	0	1+0	2	0+0	0
	DF	(England) ENG	Faeth Abdulkader	1	0	0+0	0	0+0	0	1+0	0	0+0	0
	DF	(England) ENG	Jaylen Peters-Webbe	2	0	0+0	0	0+0	0	1+0	0	0+1	0
	DF	(England) ENG	Frazer Gaulton	2	0	0+0	0	0+0	0	1+0	0	1+0	0
	DF	(England) ENG	Oliver Brooks Hopkins	1	0	0+0	0	0+0	0	1+0	0	0+0	0
	MF	(England) ENG	Daniel Hayhurst	2	0	0+0	0	0+0	0	1+0	0	0+1	0
	FW	(England) ENG	Destin Vika	2	0	0+0	0	0+0	0	1+0	0	0+1	0
	MF	(England) ENG	Freddie Ackerley	2	0	0+0	0	0+0	0	1+0	0	0+1	0
	FW	(England) ENG	Alex Mather	2	0	0+0	0	0+0	0	1+0	0	0+1	0
	MF	(England) ENG	Liam Gould	2	0	0+0	0	0+0	0	1+0	0	1+0	0
	FW	(England) ENG	Gerald McCullion	4	1	0+1	0	0+0	0	1+0	0	1+1	1
		(England) ENG	George Whitwell	1	0	0+0	0	0+0	0	0+1	0	0+0	0
		(England) ENG	Adam Cooke	1	0	0+0	0	0+0	0	0+1	0	0+0	0
		(England) ENG	Jayden Jones	1	0	0+0	0	0+0	0	0+1	0	0+0	0
		(England) ENG	Avian Fennell	1	0	0+0	0	0+0	0	0+1	0	0+0	0
		(England) ENG	Joe Lynchey	1	0	0+0	0	0+0	0	0+0	0	1+0	0
		(England) ENG	Jaylen Webbe	1	0	0+0	0	0+0	0	0+0	0	1+0	0
		(England) ENG	Patrick Johnrose	1	1	0+0	0	0+0	0	0+0	0	1+0	1
		(England) ENG	Matty Read	1	0	0+0	0	0+0	0	0+0	0	0+1	0
		(England) ENG	Jack O'Malley	1	0	0+0	0	0+0	0	0+0	0	0+1	0
