= 2024–25 Bury F.C. season =

Bury
2024–25 season
- Chairman: Gareth Castick
- Manager: Dave McNabb
- Stadium: Gigg Lane
- North West Counties Football League Premier Division: 1st
- FA Cup: Fourth Qualifying Round
- FA Vase: First Round
- Manchester FA Premier Cup: First Round
- League Challenge Cup: Second Round
- Top goalscorer: League: Djavan Pedro (24 Goals); All: Djavan Pedro (24); Rustam Stepans (24 Goals Each)
- Highest home attendance: 8,719 vs Burscough (19 April 2025); North West Counties Premier Division
- Lowest home attendance: 392 vs Chadderton (18 November 2024); League Challenge Cup
- Average home league attendance: 3,315
- Biggest win: 8–0 vs Longridge Town (H), 16 November 2024
- Biggest defeat: 0–4 vs West Didsbury & Chorlton (A), 4 January 2025

The 2024–25 season was Bury F.C.'s second in the North West Counties Premier Division. They became league champions and were promoted to the Northern Premier League West Division.

== Transfers and contracts ==
=== In ===
Date from	Position	Nationality	Name	From	Fee	Ref.
5 June 2024	CF	(England)	Ruben Jerome	(England) Emley	Free	
5 June 2024	CF	(England)	Iyrwah Gooden	(England) Emley	Free	
6 June 2024	GK	(England)	Tom Stewart	(England) Lancaster City	Free	
7 June 2024	LB	(England)	Will Calligan	(England) Stockport Town	Free	
7 June 2024	MF	(Portugal)	Bebeto Gomes	(England) Skelmersdale United	Free	
8 June 2024	CB	(Nigeria)	Efe Ambrose	(Scotland) Queen of the South	Free	
8 June 2024	CM	(England)	Bobby Carroll	(England) Workington	Free	
8 June 2024	RW	(England)	Morgan Homson-Smith	(England) Longridge Town	Free	
9 June 2024	AM	(Latvia)	Rustam Stepans	(England) Charnock Richard	Free	
9 June 2024	AM	(Republic of Ireland)	Bryan Ly	(England) Wythenshawe	Free	
11 June 2025	CM	(England)	Lewis Earl	(England) Marine	Free	
16 June 2024	CB	(England)	Macauley Wilson	(England) Bamber Bridge	Free	
20 June 2024	CM	(England)	Brad Carroll	(England) Lancaster City	Free	
22 June 2024	CM	(England)	Josh Gregory	(England) Prescot Cables	Free	
13 July 2024	WI	(England)	Jack Dunn	(England) Marine	Free	
16 July 2024	FB	(England)	Connor Pye	(England) Sunderland	Free	
10 August 2024	FW	(England)	Lewis Alessandra	(England) Hyde United	Free	
10 August 2024	MF	(England)	Cameron Fogerty	(England) Witton Albion	Free	
23 August 2024	CB	(England)	Ben Hockenhull	(England) Tranmere Rovers	Free	
23 August 2024	GK	(England)	Mitch Allen	(England) Prescot Cables	Free	
16 October 2024	AM	(England)	Patrick Jarrett	(Scotland) Queen’s Park	Free	
23 October 2024	ST	(England)	Djavan Pedro	(England) Buxton	Free	
25 November 2024	ST	(England)	Djavan Pedro	(England) Buxton	Free	
2 December 2024	WI	(Wales)	Nicky Adams	(England) Radcliffe	Free	
6 December 2024	CB	(England)	Aaron Chalmers	(England) Stalybridge Celtic	Free	
18 December 2024	CB	(England)	Eoin Charles	(England) Droylsden	Free	
18 December 2024	DF	(England)	Courtney Meppen-Walter	(England) Nantwich Town	Undisclosed Fee	
3 January 2025	FW	(England)	Lewis Byrne	(England) Chadderton	Free	
17 January 2025	DF	(England)	Louis Jeanne	(England) Wythenshawe Town	Free	
17 January 2025	AM	(England)	Tyler James	(England) Padiham	Free	
28 January 2025	DF	(England)	Aiden Walker	(England) Farsley Celtic	Free	
7 February 2025	LB	(England)	Reece Kendall	(England) Matlock Town	Free	
23 August 2025	CB	(England)	Ben Hockenhull	(England) Tranmere Rovers	Free	
23 August 2025	GK	(England)	Mitch Allen	(England) Prescot Cables	Free	
16 October 2025	AM	(England)	Patrick Jarrett	(Scotland) Queen’s Park	Free	

=== Out ===
Date from	Position	Nationality	Name	Reason	To	Fee	Ref.
18 May 2024	DF	(England)	Oli Jepson	declined contract renewal	(England) Stafford Rangers	Free	
18 May 2024	DF	(England)	Harry Wright	declined contract renewal	(England) Wythenshawe	Undisclosed Fee	
18 May 2024	FW	(England)	Keenan Ferguson	Loan Expired	(England) Wythenshawe	NA	
18 May 2024	FW	(England)	Ollie Kilner	Loan Expired	(England) Wythenshawe	NA	
18 May 2024	FW	(England)	Miles Storey	Loan Expired	(England) Colne	NA	
23 August 2024	CB	(Nigeria)	Efe Ambrose	Departed	(England) Workington	NA	
29 August 2024	FW	(England)	Connor Comber	Departed	NA	NA	
13 September 2024	FW	(England)	Macauley Wilson	Mutual Consent	(England) Bamber Bridge	Free	
29 September 2024	GK	(England)	Tom Stewart	Departed	NA	NA	
4 October 2024	FW	(England)	Andy Briggs	Dual Registration	(England) Widnes	Free	
20 November 2024	WI	(England)	Iyrwah Gooden	Dual Registration	(England) Bradford (Park Avenue)	Free	
23 November 2024	FW	(England)	Andy Briggs	Transfer	(England) West Didsbury & Chorlton	Free	
30 November 2024	FW	(England)	Lewis Alessandra	Retirement	NA	NA	
28 December 2024	FW	(England)	Max Harrop	Transfer	Witton Albion	free	
16 January 2025	CB	(England)	Ben Hockenhull	Exploring new opportunities	(England) Curzon Ashton	Free	
16 January 2025	WI	(England)	Jack Dunn	Left	NA	NA	
16 January 2025	AM	(England)	Patrick Jarrett	left on permanent basis	NA	NA	
16 January 2025	FW	(England)	Andy Briggs	Retirement	NA	NA	
16 January 2025	FW	(England)	Andy Briggs	Retirement	NA	NA	
15 April 2025	MF	(England)	Nicky Adams	Retirement	NA	NA	

=== Loaned in ===
Date from	Position	Nationality	Name	From	Date Until	Ref.
23 October 2024	ST	(England)	Djavan Pedro	(England) Buxton	January 2025	

=== Loaned out ===
Date from	Position	Nationality	Name	To	Date until	Ref.
1 November 2024	WI	(England)	Jack Dunn	(England) Longridge Town	End of Season	
16 January 2025	RW	(England)	Brad Carroll	(England) Longridge Town	16 February 2025	
24 January 2025	CM	(England)	Brad Carroll	(England) Clitheroe	21 February 2025	
30 January 2025	DF	(England)	Courtney Meppen-Walter	(England) Stalybridge Celtic	19 April 2025	
5 March 2025	FW	(Zimbabwe)	Alex Cherera	(England) Widnes	2 April 2025	

=== Released / Out of Contract ===
Date	Position	Nationality	Name	Subsequent Club	Join Date	Ref.
18 May 2024	DF	(England)	Oliver Jepson	(England) Stafford Rangers	May 23, 2024	
18 May 2024	DF	(England)	Harry Wright	(England) Wythenshawe	July 1, 2025	
18 May 2024	ST	(England)	Jacob Holland-Wilkinson	(England) Chorley	August 2, 2024	
18 May 2024	FW	(England)	Arthur Lomax	(England) Cleethorpes Town	July 1, 2025	
18 May 2024	LB	(England)	Joe Maguire	NA	August 1, 2025	
18 May 2024	FW	(England)	Dean Pinnington	NA	NA	

=== New Contract ===
Date	Position	Nationality	Name	signed on	Contracted until	Ref.
18 May 2024	FW	(Zimbabwe)	Alex Cherera	18 May 2024	NA	
18 May 2024	MF	(England)	Sam Coughlan	18 May 2024	NA	
18 May 2024	DF	(England)	Max Harrop	18 May 2024	NA	

== Pre-season and friendlies ==
Win Draw Loss

2 July 2024	Emley	0–1	Bury	Emley
14:00 BST		Report	Jerome 68'	Stadium: Welfare Ground; Attendance: 451

6 July 2024	Atherton LR	0–1	Bury	Atherton
19:45 BST		Report	Cherera 11'	Stadium: Crilly Park

9 July 2024	Ashton Town	0–1	Bury	Ashton-in-Makerfield
15:00 BST		Report	Trialist D 24'	Stadium: Edge Green Street

13 July 2024	Hanley Town	C–C	Bury	Hanley
15:00 BST		Report		Stadium: Potteries Park

13 July 2024	Atherton Collieries	1–4	Bury	Atherton
15:00 BST	72'	Report	Dunn 23'; Gomes 60'; Cherera 75', 84'	Stadium: Alder House

16 July 2024	Nantwich Town	1–3	Bury	Nantwich
19:45 BST	36'	Report	Wilson 56'; Gooden 58'; Coughlan 79'	Stadium: Weaver Stadium

19 July 2024	Nelson	0–1	Bury	Nelson
19:30 BST		Report	Coughlan 90'	Stadium: Victoria Park

20 July 2024	Trafford	1–3	Bury	Flixton
15:00 BST	77'	Report	Ly 22'; Couglan 41'; Gooden 46'	Stadium: Shawe View

== Competitions ==
Win Draw Loss

=== League ===
27 July 2024 1	Squires Gate	4–4	Bury	Blackpool
15:00 BST	Ing 9', 65', 73'; Hughes 47'	Report	Gooden 6'; Stepans 34', 42'; Wilson (yellow card) 52'; Ly 64'	Stadium: The Brian Addison Stadium; Attendance: 1,000

30 July 2024 2	Padiham	1–5	Bury	Padiham
19:45 BST	Brownhill 27' (pen.)	Report	Gomes 4', 40'; Gooden 18'; Coughlan 45+4'; Stepans 56'; B. Carroll (yellow card) 76'	Stadium: Arbories Memorial Sports Ground; Attendance: 1,407

10 August 2024 3	Bury	2–2	Irlam	Bury
15:00 BST	Gregory (yellow card) 41'; Jerome 45+5'; Stepans 64' (pen.)	Report	Johnston 28'; Daniels 45+9' (pen.)	Stadium: Gigg Lane; Attendance: 2,947

13 August 2024 4	Abbey Hey	1–7	Bury	Abbey Hey
19:45 BST	Wray 90+6'	Report	Gomes 13'; Jerome (yellow card) 42' (goal) 50', 55', 60'; Stepans 70' (yellow card) 89'; Fogerty 80'; Ambrose 90+2'	Stadium: Abbey Stadium; Attendance: 1,146

20 August 2024 5	Bury	2–0	A.F.C. Liverpool	Bury
19:45 BST	Wilson 12'; Cherera (yellow card) 16'; Ly (yellow card) 76'; Stepans 90+1' (pen.)	Report		Stadium: Gigg Lane; Attendance: 2,566

26 August 2024 6	Bury	3–0	Cheadle Town	Bury
15:00 BST	Cherera 14', 57'; Jerome 57'	Report		Stadium: Gigg Lane; Attendance: 2,744

3 September 2024 7	Bury	2–0	South Liverpool	Bury
19:45 BST	Gomes (yellow card) 17'; Cherera 54'; Stepans 75'	Report		Stadium: Gigg Lane; Attendance: 2,320

7 September 2024 8	F.C. Isle of Man	1–1	Bury	Douglas
18:00 BST	Sherry (yellow card) 45' (yellow-red card) 86'; Doyle 57'	Report	Briggs (yellow card) 90+2'; Cherera (yellow card) 90+4'; Hockenhull 90+6'	Stadium: The Bowl; Attendance: 2,055

10 September 2024 9	Glossop North End	2–4	Bury	Glossop
19:45 BST	Reilly 7' (pen.); Lawless 79'	Report	Ly 34'; Jerome 45+1'; Gregory 58'; Gooden 70'	Stadium: Surrey Street; Attendance: 660

17 September 2024 10	Ramsbottom United	1–1	Bury	Ramsbottom
19:45 BST	Whyte 15'	Report	Gomes (yellow card) 45'; Stepans 76'	Stadium: Harry Williams Riverside Stadium; Attendance: 1,773

24 September 2024 11	Bury	2–1	Stockport Town	Bury
19:45 BST	Jerome (yellow card) 38'; Stepans 54' (pen.); Coughlan 90'	Report	Walsh (red card) 60'; Coughlan 90+2' (o.g.)	Stadium: Gigg Lane; Attendance: 2,381

1 October 2024 12	Bury	3–1	Chadderton	Bury
19:45 BST	Alessandra 24'; Ly 56'; Stepans 61'; Gregory (yellow card)	Report	Dale 75'	Stadium: Gigg Lane; Attendance: 2,413

5 October 2024 13	Longridge Town	1–5	Bury	Longridge
15:00 BST	Smith 55' (pen.)	Report	Coughlan (yellow card) 11'; Pye (yellow card) 34' (goal) 45+2'; Gooden 46'; Gomes (yellow card) 53'; Hockenhall 67'; Ly 75'; Fogerty 88'	Stadium: The Recycling Lives Ground; Attendance: 1,000

8 October 2024 14	Bury	2–2	Glossop North End	Bury
19:45 BST	Stepans 55' (pen.); Ly 64'; Earl (yellow card)	Report	Gallagher 69'; Fisher 78'	Stadium: Gigg Lane; Attendance: 2,558

22 October 2024 15	Charnock Richard	0–2	Bury	Charnock Richard
19:45 BST	Haydock (red card) 41'	Report	Stepans 35' (pen.); B.L. Carroll 45+3'	Stadium: Mossie Park; Attendance: 741

26 October 2024 16	Colne	0–2	Bury	Colne
15:00 BST		Report	Hockenhull 51'; Pye 66'	Stadium: Holt House; Attendance: 1,038

2 November 2024 17	Bury	2–0	Pilkington	Bury
15:00 GMT	Ly 12'; Pedro 70'; Hockenhull (yellow card) 86'	Report		Stadium: Gigg Lane; Attendance: 2,790

5 November 2024 18	Bury	1–1	F.C. St Helens	Bury
19:45 GMT	Pedro 34'; Stepans (yellow card) 51'; Gomes (yellow card) 55'; Hockenhull (yellow card)	Report	Barker 48'	Stadium: Gigg Lane; Attendance: 2,376

9 November 2024 19	A.F.C. Liverpool	0–2	Bury	Crosby
13:00 GMT		Report	Pedro 2', 74' (yellow card) 33'; Pye (yellow card) 18'; Jarrett (yellow card) 90+3'	Stadium: Rossett Park; Attendance: 706

12 November 2024 20	Bury	1–1	Charnock Richard	Bury
19:45 GMT	Pedro (yellow card) 63'; Cherera 71'	Report	Chingwaro 38'	Stadium: Gigg Lane; Attendance: 2,503

16 November 2024 21	Bury	8–0	Longridge Town	Bury
15:00 GMT	Newton 13' (o.g.); Earl 24' (yellow card) 90+1'; Stepans 30'; Pedro 34', 60'; Gomes 40' (yellow card) 66'; Cherera 78'; Jerome 90'	Report		Stadium: Gigg Lane; Attendance: 2,983

23 November 2024 22	Lower Breck	4–3	Bury	Anfield
15:00 GMT	Croughan 16'; Hughes 33', 38'; Millington 76'	Report	Pedro 21'; Hockenhull (yellow card) 34'; Jarrett 79'; Cherera 88'; B.L. Carroll (red card) 90+2'	Stadium: Anfield Sports and Community Centre; Attendance: 556

30 November 2024 23	Burscough	2–4	Bury	Burscough
15:00 GMT	Turner 56'; McCulloch 83'	Report	Pedro 4' (yellow card) 90+6'; Jerome 19'; Ly 29', 38'; Hockenhull (yellow card) 61'	Stadium: The Community Stadium; Attendance: 680

4 December 2024 24	Litherland REMYCA	3–1	Bury	Litherland
19:45 GMT	Corness 31', 76'; Falloh 34'	Report	Jerome (yellow card) 44'; Pedro 49' (yellow card) 62'; Hockenhull (yellow card)	Stadium: Litherland Sports Park; Attendance: 231

7 December 2024 25	Bury	4–0	Colne	Bury
15:00 GMT	Ly 26'; Chalmers 49'; Pedro 53' (yellow card); Coughlan; Jerome (yellow card) 73'; Fogerty (yellow card)	Report		Stadium: Gigg Lane; Attendance: 2,574

10 December 2024 26	Irlam	1–1	Bury	Irlam
19:45 GMT	Langford 62' (red card) 79'	Report	Fogerty 35'; Chalmers (yellow card) 72'	Stadium: Silver Street; Attendance: 650

14 December 2024 27	Bury	3–3	Abbey Hey	Bury
15:00 GMT	Stepans (yellow card) 45'; Gomes 57'; Chalmers 71' (yellow card); Ly 85'; Pye (yellow card) 90+8'	Report	Stanyer 22'; Ankers 78'; Yoak 90+9'	Stadium: Gigg Lane; Attendance: 2,616

20 December 2024 28	Chadderton	2–5	Bury	Oldham
19:45 GMT	Byrne 25'; Worrall 61' (yellow card)	Report	Pedro 14', 31', 45+5', 64'; Chalmers (yellow card) 66'; Jerome (yellow card) 84'; Ly 90+5' (pen.); Peet (yellow card); Fogerty (yellow card)	Stadium: Whitebank Stadium; Attendance: 1,136

26 December 2024 29	Bury	2–2	Ramsbottom United	Bury
15:00 GMT	Pedro 24'; Ly 84' (pen.); Adams (yellow card)	Report	Sephton 18'; Turner 36'	Stadium: Gigg Lane; Attendance: 5,834

28 December 2024 30	Bury	5–2	Prestwich Heys	Bury
15:00 GMT	Fogerty 37'; Cherera 38'; Ly 75' (pen.); Stepans 87', 90+3'	Report	Belcher 26', 71'	Stadium: Gigg Lane; Attendance: 3,843

4 January 2025 31	West Didsbury & Chorlton	4–0	Bury	Chorlton-cum-Hardy
15:00 GMT	Lazenbury 11' Briggs 21' (o.g.) Billingsley 66' Abadaki 80'	Report	Hockenhull (yellow card) 57'	Stadium: The Recreation Ground; Attendance: 1,320

11 January 2025	Bury	P–P	F.C. Isle of Man	Bury
15:00 GMT		Report		Stadium: Gigg Lane

18 January 2025 32	Barnoldswick Town	1–4	Bury	Barnoldswick
15:00 GMT	Procter 90'	Report	Pedro (yellow card) 32'; B.L. Carroll (yellow card) 37'; Stepans 48'; Byrne 65'; Jerome 73'; James 75'	Stadium: Greenberfield Lane; Attendance: 1,004

25 January 2025 33	Bury	3–2	Lower Breck	Bury
15:00 GMT	Pedro 10', 23' (pen.), 27' (yellow card); Fogerty (yellow card); Chalmers (yellow card); Adams (yellow card) 78'; Peet (yellow card) 90+4'	Report	Mitchell 2'; Burns 87'	Stadium: Gigg Lane; Attendance: 3,127

1 February 2025 34	Stockport Town	1–2	Bury	Woodley
15:00 GMT	Atkinson 89'	Report	Pedro 4' (pen.), 25'; Jerome (yellow card) 43'	Stadium: Stockport Sports Village; Attendance: 1,240

4 February 2025 35	Bury	3–2	F.C. Isle of Man	Bury
19:45 GMT	Chalmers 44'; Gregory (yellow card) 57'; Pedro (yellow card) 70' (goal) 90+4'; Stepans 73'; Jeanne (yellow card) 90+2'	Report	Doyle 10', 86'; (yellow card) 69'; (yellow card) 90'	Stadium: Gigg Lane; Attendance: 2,699

8 February 2025 36	Prestwich Heys	0–2	Bury	Prestwich
15:00 GMT		Report	Gregory 23' (yellow card) 61'; Ly 90+4'	Stadium: Adie Moran Park; Attendance: 1,000

15 February 2025 37	Bury	2–1	West Didsbury & Chorlton	Bury
15:00 GMT	Gregory 56'; Pedro 75' (pen.); Fogerty (yellow card) 90'	Report	Lazenbury 48'	Stadium: Gigg Lane; Attendance: 3,724

22 February 2025 38	South Liverpool	0–1	Bury	Aigburth
15:00 GMT		Report	Pedro 4'	Stadium: Jericho Lane; Attendance: 626

1 March 2025 39	Bury	7–0	Litherland REMYCA	Bury
15:00 GMT	Chalmers 11'; Stepans 16'; Pedro (yellow card) 20'; Byrne 37'; Walker 39'; Fogerty 44'; James 46'; Jerome 90+4'	Report		Stadium: Gigg Lane; Attendance: 3,315

8 March 2025 40	Bury	2–0	Barnoldswick Town	Bury
15:00 GMT	Gregory 20'; Byrne 66'	Report		Stadium: Gigg Lane; Attendance: 3,497

15 March 2025 41	F.C. St Helens	0–1	Bury	St Helens
15:00 GMT		Report	Fogerty 43'	Stadium: Windleshaw Sports; Attendance: 1,100

22 March 2025 42	Pilkington	0–2	Bury	St Helens
15:00 GMT		Report	Byrne 55'; B.L. Carroll (yellow card) 87'; Stepans 90+3'	Stadium: Ruskin Drive; Attendance: 882

29 March 2025 43	Bury	3–0	Squires Gate	Bury
15:00 GMT	Stepans 20', 73'; Chalmers (yellow card) 26'; B.L. Carroll (yellow card) 82'; Ly 88'	Report		Stadium: Gigg Lane; Attendance: 3,894

5 April 2025 44	Bury	4–0	Padiham	Bury
15:00 BST	Pedro 4'; James 25', 50', 73'	Report		Stadium: Gigg Lane; Attendance: 3,832

12 April 2025 45	Cheadle Town	0–2	Bury	Moston
15:00 BST		Report	James 3', 54'	Stadium: Broadhurst Park; Attendance: 2,487; Referee: Anthony Ross

19 April 2025 46	Bury	4–0	Burscough	Bury
15:00 BST	Walker 19'; James 23', 58', 63'; Pye (yellow card) 90+2'	Report		Stadium: Gigg Lane; Attendance: 8,719

=== FA Cup ===
3 August 2024 Extra Preliminary	Congleton Town	2–4	Bury	Congleton
15:00 BST	McCarthy 59'; Chadwick 73'	Report	Cherera 38', 56', 65'; Jerome 72'	Stadium: Cleric Stadium; Attendance: 912

17 August 2024 Preliminary	Avro	1–2	Bury	Limeside
15:00 BST	Davidson 58'	Report	Cherera 43'; Fogerty (yellow card) 65'; Alessandra 87'	Stadium: Whitebank Stadium; Attendance: 917

31 August 2024 Q1	Garforth Town	0–2	Bury	Garforth
15:00 BST		Report	Cherera 45'; Alessandra 63'	Stadium: Wheatley Park; Attendance: 1,186

14 September 2024 Q2	Blyth Spartans	0–3	Bury	Blyth
15:00 BST		Report	Cherera 53'; Gomes 69'; Pye 84'	Stadium: Croft Park; Attendance: 1,246

28 September 2024 Q3	Radcliffe	2–3	Bury	Radcliffe
15:00 BST	Dudley 7'; Wardle 87'; Sargent (red card) 90'	Report	Coughlan 56' (yellow card) 61'; Jerome 82' (yellow card) 83'; Ly 90' (pen.); Pye (yellow card) 90+5'	Stadium: Stainton Park; Attendance: 2,800

12 October 2024 Q4	Harborough Town	1–0	Bury	Market Harborough
15:00 BST	Stephens 77' (pen.)	Report	B.L. Carroll (yellow card) 64'; Peet (yellow card)	Stadium: Bowden Park; Attendance: 1,800

=== Manchester FA Premier Cup ===
16 October 2024 1	Abbey Hey	4–2	Bury	Abbey Hey
19:45 BST	Ankers 45', 56'; Clooney 78'; Dickin 83'	Report	Beard 37', 41'; Babayan (red card) 53'; Cantello (yellow card) 73'; Pearce (yellow card) 79'	Stadium: Abbey Stadium; Attendance: 146

=== FA Vase ===
24 August 2024 Q1	Maghull	1–3	Bury	Bury
15:00 BST	Hammill 90+1'	Report	Gooden 50' Gomes 75' Babayan 90+4'	Stadium: Gigg Lane; Attendance: 1,505
Note: match was played at Gigg Lane

21 September 2024 Q2	Bury	3–0	Burscough	Bury
15:00 BST	Jerome 8'; Hockenhull 31'; Stepans 35'; Cherera (yellow card) 65'; Earl (yellow card) 76'	Report		Stadium: Gigg Lane; Attendance: 1,476

19 October 2024 1	Chadderton	1–1 (4–3 p)	Bury	Bury
15:00 BST	Crothers 29'	Report	Stepans 48'; Ly (yellow card) 73'; B.L. Carroll (yellow card)	Stadium: Gigg Lane; Attendance: 1,483
	Penalties
	Schofield (penalty scored); Kenny (penalty scored); Flynn (penalty scored); Byrne (penalty scored)		B.L. Carroll (penalty scored); Peet (penalty scored); Dunn (penalty missed); Stepans (penalty scored); Jarrett (penalty missed)

=== League Challenge Cup ===
18 November 2024 2	Bury	3–4	Chadderton	Bury
19:45 GMT	Dickinson-Grant 42', 47', 53'	Report	Byrne 18'; Bernard 59'; Barlow 65'; Flynn 77'	Stadium: Gigg Lane; Attendance: 392

== Squad statistics ==
=== Appearances and goals ===
As of 19 April 2025

No.	Pos	Nat	Player	Total		NWC Prem		FA Cup		Macron Cup		FA Vase		Manchester Cup	
No.	Pos	Nat	Player	Apps	Goals	Apps	Goals	Apps	Goals	Apps	Goals	Apps	Goals	Apps	Goals
	GK	(England) ENG	Tom Stewart	8	0	6+0	0	2+0	0	0+0	0	0+0	0	0+0	0
	GK	(England) ENG	Mitch Allen	46	0	39+0	0	4+0	0	0+0	0	3+0	0	0+0	0
	GK	(England) ENG	Russell Saunders	2	0	1+0	0	0+0	0	1+0	0	0+0	0	0+0	0
	GK	(England) ENG	Sam Jones	1	0	0+0	0	0+0	0	0+0	0	0+0	0	1+0	0
	GK	(England) ENG	Liam Sergent	1	0	0+0	0	0+0	0	0+1	0	0+0	0	0+0	0
	DF	(England) ENG	Gareth Peet	42	0	22+13	0	5+0	0	0+0	0	2+0	0	0+0	0
	DF	(England) ENG	Will Calligan	11	0	1+6	0	0+3	0	0+0	0	1+0	0	0+0	0
	DF	(England) ENG	Lewis Earl	34	1	16+9	1	6+0	0	0+0	0	2+1	0	0+0	0
	DF	(England) ENG	Macauley Wilson	9	1	5+1	1	0+2	0	0+0	0	0+1	0	0+0	0
	DF	(England) ENG	Connor Pye	50	3	26+16	2	4+1	1	0+0	0	3+0	0	0+0	0
	DF	(Nigeria) NGA	Efe Ambrose	7	1	2+2	1	2+0	0	0+0	0	1+0	0	0+0	0
	DF	(England) ENG	Ben Hockenhull	24	4	22+0	3	0+0	0	0+0	0	2+0	1	0+0	0
	DF	(England) ENG	Aaron Chalmers	18	4	17+1	4	0+0	0	0+0	0	0+0	0	0+0	0
	DF	(England) ENG	Courtney Meppen-Walter	5	0	3+2	0	0+0	0	0+0	0	0+0	0	0+0	0
	DF	(England) ENG	Jack Pearce	1	0	0+0	0	0+0	0	0+0	0	0+0	0	1+0	0
	DF	(England) ENG	Cole Dewhurst	1	0	0+0	0	0+0	0	0+0	0	0+0	0	1+0	0
	DF	(England) ENG	David Oko	2	0	0+0	0	0+0	0	1+0	0	0+0	0	1+0	0
	DF	(England) ENG	Prindi Kimputu	1	0	0+0	0	0+0	0	1+0	0	0+0	0	0+0	0
	DF	(England) ENG	Ethan Bradshaw	1	0	0+0	0	0+0	0	1+0	0	0+0	0	0+0	0
	DF	(England) ENG	Aiden Walker	13	2	12+1	2	0+0	0	0+0	0	0+0	0	0+0	0
	DF	(England) ENG	Blerti Jacaj	1	0	0+0	0	0+0	0	1+0	0	0+0	0	0+0	0
	DF	(England) ENG	Bamba Fall	1	0	0+0	0	0+0	0	0+1	0	0+0	0	0+0	0
	MF	(England) ENG	Sam Coughlan	31	4	11+13	3	3+1	1	0+0	0	3+0	0	0+0	0
	MF	(Portugal) POR	Bebeto Gomes	48	6	37+4	4	5+0	1	0+0	0	1+1	1	0+0	0
	MF	(England) ENG	Bobby Carroll	44	1	35+1	1	6+0	0	0+0	0	2+0	0	0+0	0
	MF	(England) ENG	Brad Carroll	4	0	2+1	0	1+0	0	0+0	0	0+0	0	0+0	0
	MF	(England) ENG	Josh Gregory	35	4	14+11	4	1+5	0	0+0	0	2+1	0	1+0	0
	MF	(England) ENG	Cameron Fogerty	50	6	42+2	6	4+0	0	0+0	0	1+1	0	0+0	0
	MF	(England) ENG	Alik Babayan	10	1	0+7	0	0+0	0	0+0	0	0+2	1	1+0	0
	MF	(England) ENG	Patrick Jarrett	10	1	2+5	1	0+0	0	1+0	0	0+1	0	1+0	0
	MF	(England) ENG	Nicky Adams	17	0	10+7	0	0+0	0	0+0	0	0+0	0	0+0	0
	MF	(England) ENG	Luis Cantello	1	0	0+0	0	0+0	0	0+0	0	0+0	0	1+0	0
	MF	(England) ENG	Tye Turner	1	0	0+0	0	0+0	0	1+0	0	0+0	0	0+0	0
	MF	(England) ENG	William Hayes	1	0	0+0	0	0+0	0	1+0	0	0+0	0	0+0	0
	MF	(England) ENG	Calvin Harper	1	0	0+0	0	0+0	0	0+1	0	0+0	0	0+0	0
	FW	(England) ENG	Andrew Briggs	12	0	0+7	0	0+4	0	0+0	0	0+1	0	0+0	0
	FW	(Zimbabwe) ZIM	Alex Cherera	37	13	15+14	7	5+0	6	0+0	0	1+2	0	0+0	0
	FW	(England) ENG	Iyrwah Gooden	25	5	8+9	4	4+1	0	0+0	0	2+1	1	0+0	0
	FW	(England) ENG	Ruben Jerome	47	13	19+21	10	6+0	2	0+0	0	1+0	1	0+0	0
	FW	(Republic of Ireland) IRL	Bryan Ly	49	16	25+16	15	2+3	1	0+0	0	2+1	0	0+0	0
	FW	(Latvia) LVA	Rustam Stepans	54	24	40+5	22	4+2	0	0+0	0	3+0	2	0+0	0
	FW	(England) ENG	Lewis Alessandra	25	3	9+10	1	2+3	2	0+0	0	1+0	0	0+0	0
	FW	(England) ENG	Jack Dunn	6	0	0+3	0	0+1	0	0+0	0	0+1	0	1+0	0
	FW	(England) ENG	Djavan Pedro	30	24	30+0	24	0+0	0	0+0	0	0+0	0	0+0	0
	FW	(England) ENG	Mamudu Touray Touray	3	0	0+1	0	0+0	0	1+0	0	0+0	0	1+0	0
	FW	(England) ENG	Morgan Homson-Smith	2	0	1+1	0	0+0	0	0+0	0	0+0	0	0+0	0
	FW	(England) ENG	Mason Beard	2	2	0+0	0	0+0	0	1+0	0	0+0	0	1+0	2
	FW	(England) ENG	Shay Fox	1	0	0+0	0	0+0	0	0+0	0	0+0	0	0+1	0
	FW	(England) ENG	Zaid Smith	2	0	0+0	0	0+0	0	0+1	0	0+0	0	0+1	0
	FW	(England) ENG	Jermaine Dickinson-Grant	2	3	0+0	0	0+0	0	1+0	3	0+0	0	0+1	0
	FW	(England) ENG	Lewis-Simon Byrne	14	4	11+3	4	0+0	0	0+0	0	0+0	0	0+0	0
	FW	(England) ENG	Tyler James	14	10	8+6	10	0+0	0	0+0	0	0+0	0	0+0	0
	FW	(England) ENG	Louis Jeanne	10	0	8+2	0	0+0	0	0+0	0	0+0	0	0+0	0
	DF	(England) ENG	Reece Kendall	9	0	6+3	0	0+0	0	0+0	0	0+0	0	0+0	0
	FW	(England) ENG	Eoin Charles	0	0	0+0	0	0+0	0	0+0	0	0+0	0	0+0	0
	FW	(England) ENG	Conor Comber	0	0	0+0	0	0+0	0	0+0	0	0+0	0	0+0	0
	GK	(England) ENG	Sam Grady	0	0	0+0	0	0+0	0	0+0	0	0+0	0	0+0	0
	DF	(England) ENG	Silas Itotayagbon	0	0	0+0	0	0+0	0	0+0	0	0+0	0	0+0	0
	DF	(England) ENG	Cody McCann	0	0	0+0	0	0+0	0	0+0	0	0+0	0	0+0	0
	FW	(England) ENG	Adam Cullen	1	0	0+0	0	0+0	0	0+1	0	0+0	0	0+0	0
