= Aaron Chalmers =

Aaron Chalmers may refer to:

- Aaron Chalmers (footballer)
- Aaron Chalmers (television personality)
