= Joseph Edwards =

Joseph or Joe Edwards may refer to:

== Arts and entertainment ==
- Joseph Edwards Jr. (1737–1783), American silversmith
- Joseph Edwards Carpenter (1813–1885), English playwright and songwriter
- Joseph Edwards (sculptor) (1814–1882), Welsh sculptor
- Joe Edwards (comics) (1921–2007), cartoonist of Lil Jinx in Archie Comics
- Joe Edwards (painter) (1933–2000), Scottish painter
- Joe Edwards (singer/bass player) (fl. 2007–2009), frontman of The Rascals

== Politicians & Businessman ==
- Joe Edwards (Kansas politician) (1954–2014), American state legislator from Kansas
- Joe Edwards (St. Louis) (fl. 1972-present), businessman and community figure from St. Louis, Missouri
- Joseph Edwards (born 2006), British founder and entrepreneur

== Scientists ==
- Joe F. Edwards Jr. (born 1958), American astronaut

== Sportspeople ==
- Joseph H. Edwards (1873–1911), American football player and coach
- Joe Edwards (footballer, born 1907) (1907–1997), English football goalkeeper
- Joe Edwards (football manager) (born 1986), English football manager for Millwall F.C.
- Joe Edwards (footballer, born 1990), English professional football full-back and midfielder for Plymouth Argyle
- Joe Edwards (rugby union) (born 1993), New Zealander and Rugby union player
- Noel Edwards (footballer) (born Joseph Noel Edwards), Welsh footballer

== See also ==
- Jim Joe Edwards (1894–1965), Major League Baseball pitcher
