= Samuel Edwards (silversmith) =

American silversmith (1705–1762)

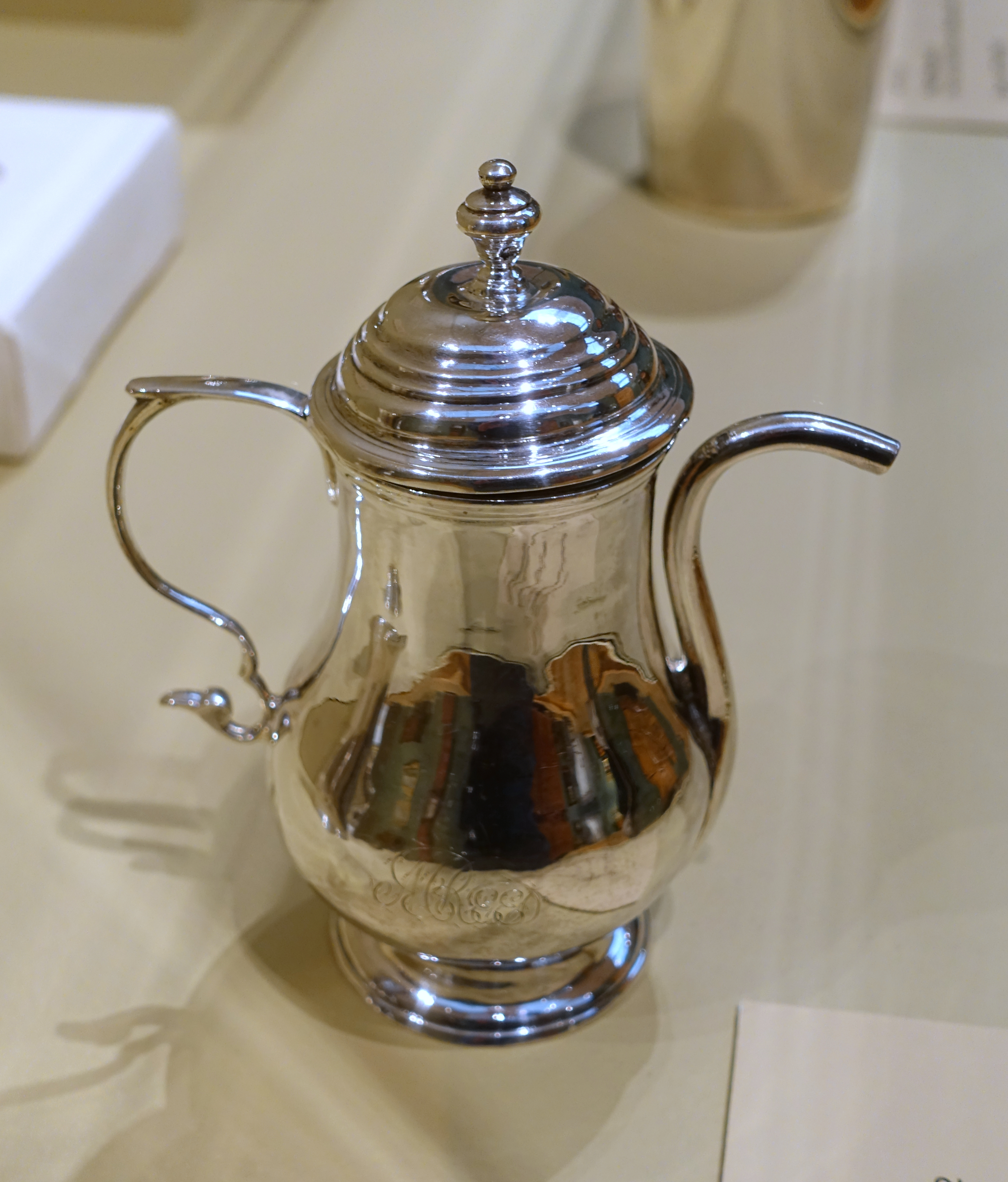
Covered spout cup by Samuel Edwards, c. 1733

Samuel Edwards (June 21, 1705 - April 14, 1762) was a silversmith, active in Boston in the Thirteen Colonies.

Edwards was the son of silversmith John Edwards (1671-1746); his older brother Thomas Edwards was also a silversmith. He married Sarah Smith on August 23, 1733, and was appointed Assessor in 1760. He created pieces for a number of local congregations and received commissions from the General Assembly for presentation pieces, as well as selling silver to individuals. His obituary in the Boston Gazette, April 19, 1762, records that he "... died here after a few Days Illness of a violent Fever, in the 57th Year of his Age, Mr. Samuel Edwards, goldsmith, who, for several Years has been one of the Assesors of the Town; and esteemed as a Man of Integrity, exact and faithful in all his Transactions; His Death is Lamented as a publick Loss." He bequeathed to his nephew, silversmith Joseph Edwards Jr., "a thimble stamp and a swage for tea and large spoons." On June 17, 1765, "Joseph Edwards of Cornhill" advertised in the Boston Gazette the sale of some of the late Samuel Edwards' possessions, including "Gold Beads, a pair Gold Buckles, Gold Buttons, with many other Articles of Gold and Silver, too many to be enumerated."

Edwards' work is collected in the Museum of Fine Arts, Boston, Currier Museum of Art, Art Institute of Chicago, Historic Deerfield, and Metropolitan Museum of Art.
