= Gavin Massey =

English footballer (born 1992)

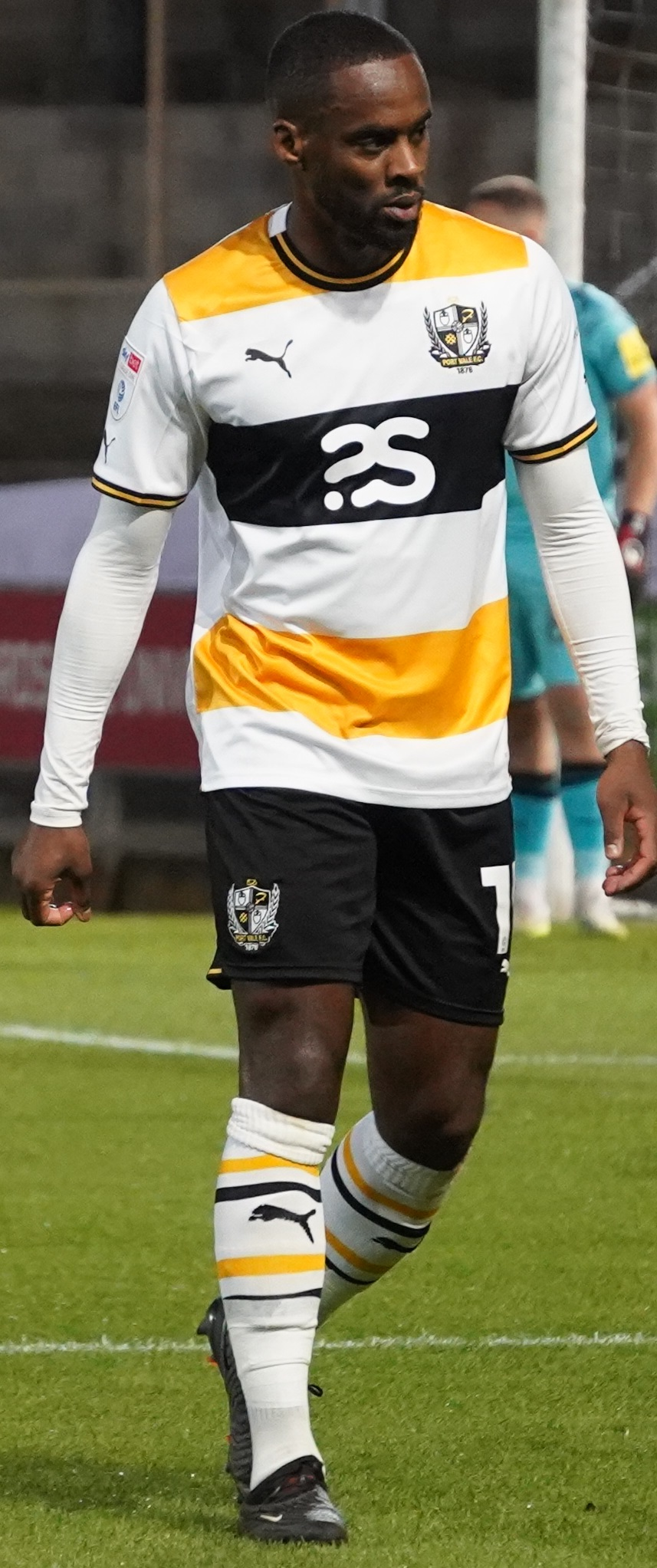
- Massey playing for Port Vale in October 2023

Personal information
- Full name: Gavin Alexander Massey
- Date of birth: 4 October 1992 (age 34)
- Place of birth: Watford, England
- Height: 5 ft 8 in (1.73 m)
- Positions: Winger; forward

Youth career
- 2002–2010: Watford

Senior career*
Years	Team	Apps	(Gls)
2010–2012	Watford	7	(0)
2011	→ Wealdstone (loan)	6	(1)
2011–2012	→ Yeovil Town (loan)	16	(3)
2012	→ Colchester United (loan)	3	(0)
2012	→ Colchester United (loan)	5	(0)
2012–2016	Colchester United	158	(20)
2016–2017	Leyton Orient	36	(8)
2017–2022	Wigan Athletic	142	(12)
2022–2024	Port Vale	81	(3)
2024–2025	AFC Fylde	38	(6)
2025–2026	Bury	10	(2)
Total		502	(55)
- * Club domestic league appearances and goals

Gavin Alexander Massey (born 4 October 1992) is an English former professional footballer who played as a forward or winger. Massey was a versatile attacker who could play as a forward or as a winger.

Massey was one of the first players to progress through the Watford-affiliated Harefield Academy, where he broke into the first team in 2010. During his time with Watford, Massey was loaned to Wealdstone, Yeovil Town and twice to Colchester United. In 2012, Massey joined Colchester permanently, where he made over 150 league appearances. He joined Leyton Orient in the summer of 2016 before signing for Wigan Athletic a year later. He spent five seasons with Wigan, helping them to the League One title in the 2017–18 and 2021–22 seasons and featuring in over 50 Championship matches. He was released from Wigan in June 2022 and joined Port Vale the following month. He spent two seasons with Vale before joining non-League club AFC Fylde for one season and then Bury in September 2025. He retired after winning the Northern Premier League Division One West title with Bury in 2025–26.

== Career ==
=== Watford ===
Born in Watford, Massey grew up within 300 yards (270 m) of Watford Football Club's Vicarage Road stadium. He became one of the first players to progress through the club-affiliated Harefield Academy, which he joined in 2007, having been with the club since the age of nine. He helped the Watford reserve team to the East Division title during the first year of his scholarship in 2010. Following his good form for the youth team and reserve sides, Watford manager Malky Mackay named Massey in his squad for the final game of the 2009–10 season. He made his debut in the Championship match at Coventry City on 2 May 2010, replacing Danny Graham 85 minutes into the game.

After attracting attention from Premier League clubs, including Liverpool, Massey signed a two-year professional contract with Watford in May 2010. Despite the interest, Massey claimed that he "never thought about moving" to Liverpool, as he wished to learn his trade at Watford. He featured in the club's first-team throughout pre-season, claiming a goal in a 3–1 win against Wealdstone on 28 July. During the season, Massey featured for both the under-18 and reserve sides. He scored a hat-trick against Milton Keynes Dons for the under-18 side in November 2010, and on the back of his performances, Mackay once again drafted Massey into his first-team squad, this time for the visit of Sven-Göran Eriksson's Leicester City on 4 December. Massey made his first appearance of the season in the game, replacing Marvin Sordell after 87 minutes of the 3–2 victory. He was brought on as a late substitute during Watford's 4–1 home win over Cardiff City on 28 December, and again in a 3–0 win against Portsmouth on 1 January 2011. Massey then made his first FA Cup outing on 8 January, substituting Sordell after 83 minutes of their 4–1 win over Hartlepool United.

After helping Watford's under-18s to the FA Youth Cup quarter-finals, Massey joined Isthmian League Premier Division side Wealdstone on 7 March 2011 on loan until the end of the season as they chased a play-off place. Massey continued to train with Watford while at Wealdstone, He made his debut for the club the same day, featuring in the 0–0 draw with Tonbridge Angels. Massey scored his first goal for the club on 2 April during a 3–1 defeat to Concord Rangers. Massey was recalled by Watford on 22 April after making six appearances and scoring one goal for Wealdstone.

For the 2011–12 pre-season, Massey once again featured in the opening game, a 2–2 draw with Boreham Wood on 9 July 2011. Shortly afterwards, Massey signed a new contract extension with Watford to keep him at the club until 2013. He made his first appearance of the season under new manager Sean Dyche on 13 August, replacing Craig Forsyth after 87 minutes of Watford's 1–0 home defeat to Derby County. He replaced Chris Iwelumo after 56 minutes of Watford's 4–0 home defeat to West Ham United on 16 August, Massey then made his first appearance in the League Cup on 23 August when he was a half-time substitute for Mark Yeates in the 1–1 draw with Bristol Rovers, a match which Watford eventually lost 4–2 after a penalty shoot-out.

Massey joined League One club Yeovil Town on loan for one month on 12 September 2011. He made his debut as a 67th-minute substitute for Kieran Agard in the Glovers' 1–0 win over Wycombe Wanderers on 13 September. After making three substitute appearances for the club, Yeovil manager Terry Skiverton was keen on extending Massey's loan stay, saying that he had "trained really well" and he would "be getting his chance sooner rather than later". He made his first professional start on 4 October when Yeovil travelled to Bournemouth in the Football League Trophy. He played the full 90 minutes of the 3–2 defeat. Massey's loan was then extended until 6 November, before starting his first league match against Colchester United. He scored his first professional goal in the game on 8 October, putting the ball through the legs of Colchester goalkeeper Ben Williams after just 40 seconds of play. The U's pegged Yeovil back to 2–1, but Massey scored a second to tie the match at 2–2 after 63 minutes.

His loan was extended for a third month on 3 November, keeping him at Huish Park until 11 December. Massey scored his third and final goal for Yeovil two days later, equalising after 29 minutes of a 2–2 draw with Chesterfield. His deal was again extended until 14 January 2012 on 7 December, with Massey beginning to hold down a regular starting position in Terry Skiverton's side. Having made 16 appearances in all competitions, Massey's loan was again extended until mid-February on 4 January 2012.

On 9 January, Yeovil manager Terry Skiverton was demoted to assistant manager, with the club replacing him with Gary Johnson. Subsequently, Massey would make his final appearance for Yeovil on 10 January in their 4–0 reverse at Sheffield United, replacing Steve MacLean after half-time. Despite signing a loan extension the previous week, Johnson decided to allow Massey to return to Watford on 12 January. He left having scored three goals in his 17 games for the club.

=== Colchester United ===
Massey joined Colchester United on a one-month loan on 19 January 2012, the club against which he scored his first professional goals. He became John Ward's first signing of the January transfer window, after taking assurance from Sean Dyche on Massey's quality. Massey made his debut for Colchester as a 54th-minute substitute for Andy Bond on 21 January in a 2–1 defeat to bottom club Chesterfield at the Colchester Community Stadium. He made his third and final appearance on 14 February, playing the full 90 minutes of a 2–1 win over Brentford. Ahead of what was meant to be the last game of his loan spell against his former side Yeovil, Massey was recalled by Watford after Marvin Sordell moved to Bolton Wanderers and with Troy Deeney struggling for fitness. Massey made just three appearances for the U's, due mostly to poor weather and a run of postponements.

Colchester United re-signed Massey on a one-month loan deal on 16 March 2012. He made his second debut the following day as a substitute for Steven Gillespie, when a late Magnus Okuonghae own goal deprived Colchester of all three points in their 1–1 draw with Huddersfield Town. After making five appearances, Massey return to Watford when his loan expired on 16 April, bringing his total appearances to Colchester to eight for the season. Watford manager Sean Dyche said Massey was recalled because of Massey's reduced involvement in his second Colchester spell, having made just two starts and three substitute appearances. On 21 August 2012, Massey joined Colchester United on a permanent basis, signing a three-year deal on a free transfer. Massey said that "there isn't really the same opportunities for the younger players" at Watford following his exit, citing a recent takeover by the Pozzo family.

Massey made his full debut for Colchester on 25 August in a 1–1 draw with Sheffield United, coming on as a substitute for Freddie Sears in the 88th minute, and made his first start of the season in their 2–1 home defeat by Doncaster Rovers on 15 September. After replacing John Ward as manager, Joe Dunne selected Massey to start in his first game as U's boss against Hartlepool United on 29 September. Massey scored his first goal for the club, firing past Hartlepool goalkeeper Scott Flinders to even the scores at 1–1 after 39 minutes. Colchester went on to win 3–1, sealing their first win of the season. He received the first red card of his career on 24 November for a foul on Adam Chicksen as Colchester were beat 5–1 by MK Dons.

Massey's second and third goals for Colchester were scored in their 3–2 win over Portsmouth at Fratton Park on 2 February 2013, putting away a Freddie Sears cross for the opener and scoring their third goal after just 20 minutes. After scoring his fourth goal for the club on 12 March in a 2–2 draw at Coventry City, in the midst of his longest run in the U's starting line-up, Massey said that he was "loving playing football week in, week out and it's all I've ever wanted to do". He scored his fifth goal of the campaign when he headed in the opener from a Bradley Garmston cross in an important 2–1 win over Leyton Orient on 6 April, boosting Colchester's hopes of survival from relegation into League Two. He helped his side to League One safety in the final game of the 2012–13 season, heading in Billy Clifford's effort after it had rebounded off the crossbar to aid Colchester to a 2–0 win over Carlisle United. He said that it was an "unbelievable feeling" to help the club retain their place in League One. Massey ended the season having made 41 appearances and scoring six goals.

The 2013–14 season saw Massey begin his first full pre-season with Colchester. He opened his scoring account in the second game of the season, providing the only goal in a win against Port Vale at the Colchester Community Stadium on 10 August, turning in Jabo Ibehre's rebounded effort from a Chris Neal save. He then suffered a hamstring injury during Colchester's 4–1 defeat by Dagenham & Redbridge in the Football League Trophy on 3 September, leaving him out of action for much of September and early October. After making just a handful of appearances, Massey was ruled out for all of December 2013 and January 2014 with a recurrence of his hamstring injury after limping off from the U's 1–1 draw at Preston North End on 23 November. On 11 February, Massey made his first appearance since 23 November following his hamstring injury, coming on as a substitute in a 2–0 away defeat to Port Vale. He scored his first goal since 10 August in a 2–1 home victory over Coventry City on 8 March. He followed this up with his third goal of the season when he was set up by Marcus Bean in scoring a goal during a 2–2 match with Bristol City on 22 March. Massey's campaign ended with three goals in 31 appearances in a season disrupted by injury.

With manager Joe Dunne departing the club early on in the new season, Massey said that the players "have to take part responsibility for the manager going", while he thanked Dunne for helping him "to play first-team football", having racked up almost 50 appearances under Dunne's stewardship. Massey scored his first goals of the 2014–15 season in a man of the match performance on 11 October as Colchester came from behind to win 2–1 against Fleetwood Town. He grabbed an equaliser with a volley following a cross from Freddie Sears. He then scored with a shot from the edge of the box midway through the second half to seal the U's first home win of the season. New manager Tony Humes said that Massey "scored a great first goal, his first of the season and it was great for him. He also scored a fantastic winning goal and we'll take a lot of positives from this win". Massey also added that "it was an unbelievable game for me — it was definitely the best day of my career". On the back of his performance and with his contract set to expire at the end of the season, Massey signed a contract extension on 16 October to see him through to the summer of 2017. His third of the season was an equalising goal in Colchester's 2–2 away draw with Swindon Town at the County Ground on 25 October.

Massey scored his first cup goal of his professional career when he opened the scoring on 9 November as Colchester defeated Gosport Borough 6–3 in the first round of the FA Cup, driving the ball home from close range. His next goal came as a consolation in the U's 4–1 home defeat to Rochdale on 13 December after coming on as a half-time substitute. Massey's sixth goal of the season helped Colchester to a 2–0 win against relegation rivals Leyton Orient on 24 January 2015, sweeping the ball home after 14 minutes of play. He was involved in all three goals for Colchester's 3–1 home win against Barnsley on 6 April. He poked home Jacob Murphy's cross on 62 minutes to level the scores, then turned provider for Murphy to head in on 80 minutes to give the U's the lead. Six minutes later, he passed through to George Moncur to seal the victory. He scored his eighth goal of the season on 25 April with an equalising goal in the 84th minute of a 3–2 win against Fleetwood Town at Highbury Stadium. After securing League One safety on the final day of the season, Massey won the Colchester United 'Players' Player of the Year' accolade at the club's end of season dinner in May. He was involved in 51 games across the season, scoring eight goals.

Massey scored his first goal of the 2015–16 campaign at Chesterfield in League One on 12 September 2015 when he scored an equalising goal during a 3–3 draw. He scored his second of the season with the opener in Colchester's 2–1 win at home to league leaders Gillingham on 19 September. He scored his third goal five months later in Colchester's 5–2 defeat to Bury on 20 February 2016, before scoring the only goal of the game as Colchester beat Coventry 1–0 at the Ricoh Arena on 29 March. Relegation into League Two was confirmed on 26 April, at which point manager Kevin Keen was sacked. Massey ended the season with four goals in 47 appearances.

=== Leyton Orient ===
Leyton Orient signed Massey on a three-year deal from Colchester for an undisclosed fee on 8 June 2016. Massey said that he only had a brief conversation with manager Andy Hessenthaler but felt as though the club were ready to achieve promotion. He scored on his debut in a 1–1 draw with Cheltenham Town on 6 August. He scored a brace with two close-range efforts in a 3–0 win over Stevenage at Brisbane Road ten days later. Despite being praised for his form by caretaker manager Andy Edwards, he then played 23 games not scoring a goal that he ended in the new year with a run of five goals in six games under new manager Daniel Webb. He ended the 2016–17 season with eight goals in 39 matches as the O's were relegated to the National League after finished 23rd in League Two. He missed the end of the season run-in and did not feature under new manager Omer Riza after being sidelined with a hamstring injury in March.

=== Wigan Athletic ===
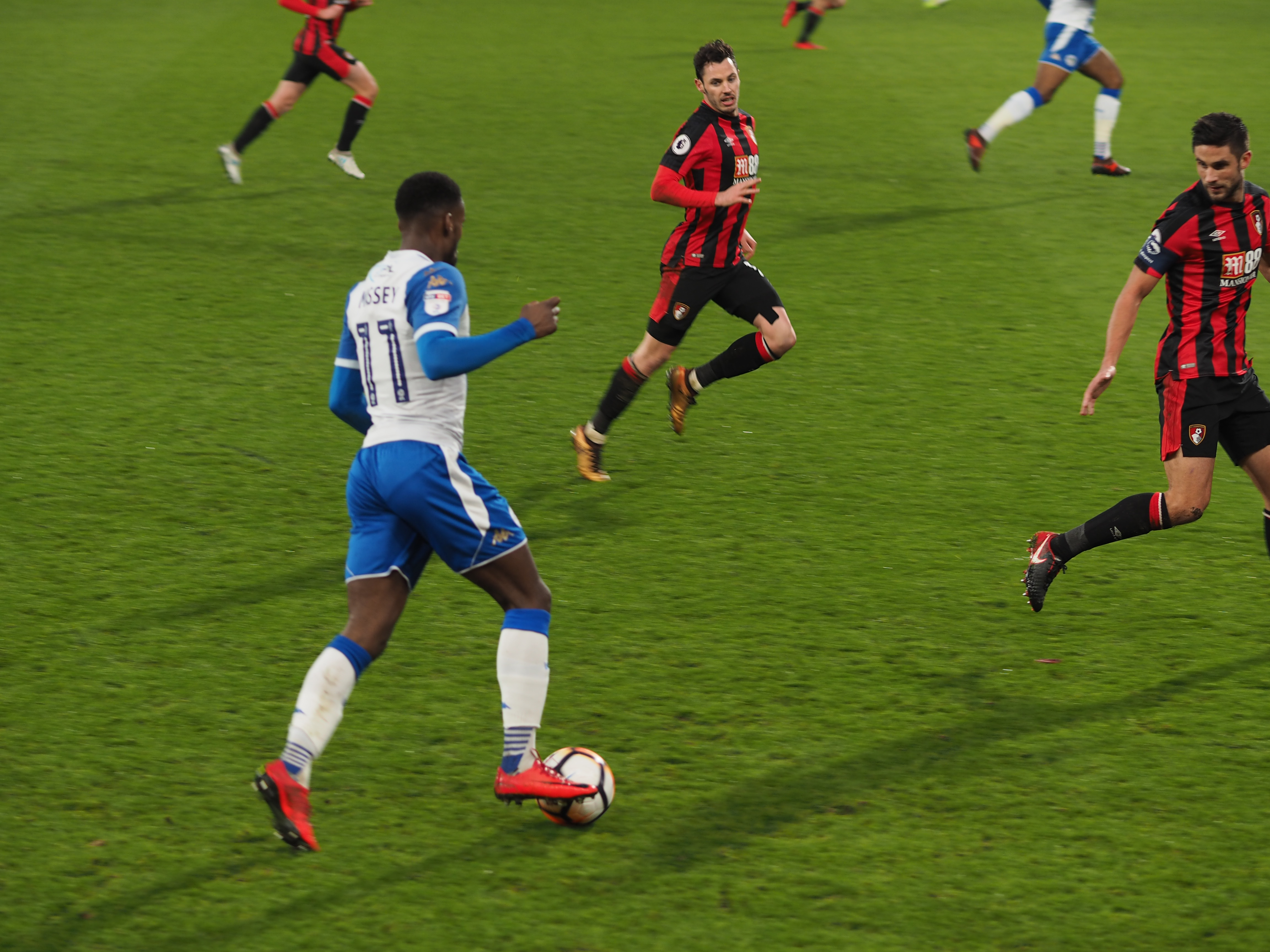
Massey playing for Wigan in 2018.

Following Leyton Orient's relegation to the National League, Massey decided to leave the club to sign for League One club Wigan Athletic on a two-year contract. His first goals for the club came when he scored twice in a 3–0 win at Charlton Athletic on 12 September. He scored another goal four days later in a 3–0 win over Bristol Rovers at the DW Stadium. Wigan reached the quarter-finals of the FA Cup that season, and Massey played all eight of the club's fixtures, including the wins over Premier League clubs Bournemouth, West Ham United and Manchester City, and the quarter-final defeat to Southampton. He also scored six goals in 35 starts and seven substitute appearances in the league as Wigan secured promotion into the Championship as champions of League One.

Massey scored his first Championship goal in a 3–0 victory at Stoke City on 22 August, having also provided the assist for Will Grigg's opening goal of the game. He had to wait another seven months for his next goal, in a 2–1 defeat at Derby County on 5 March. He scored further goals in victories over Bolton Wanderers and Leeds United to take his final tally for the 2018–19 season to five goals in twenty games as Paul Cook's Wigan retained their second tier status with an 18th-place finish. The brace against Leeds at Elland Road all but secured safety from relegation and was described by the local newspaper as "the undoubted highlight of his stay" at the club.

Massey made 23 starts and 10 substitute appearances without scoring a goal in the 2019–20 campaign as Wigan were relegated in 23rd-place after having been deducted 12 points for entering administration. He featured only 17 times in the 2020–21 season. He did not score a goal, as Wigan finished just one place and one point above the League One relegation zone. Massey scored his first goal in over two years with a late consolation goal in a 2–1 home defeat to Lincoln City on 26 October. He scored his final goal for the club in a 6–0 beating of Oldham Athletic in the EFL Trophy on 4 January. He made 46 appearances in the 2021–22 season, scoring two goals, though made only nine league starts as Wigan again secured promotion into the Championship as League One champions. Massey was released in June 2022 after five seasons with the club, having scored 13 goals in 166 club appearances.

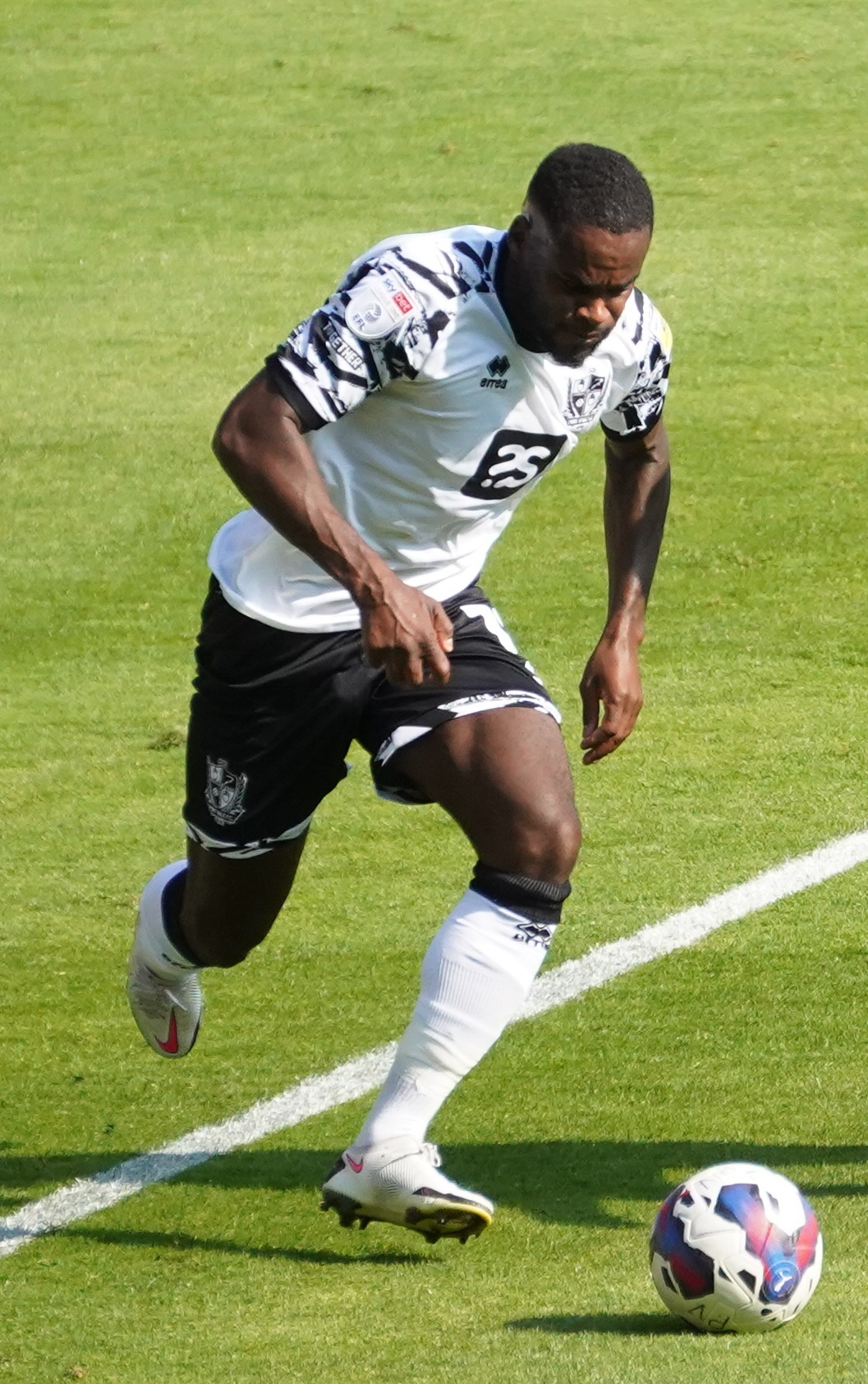
Massey playing for Port Vale in 2022

=== Port Vale ===
Massey joined recently promoted League One club Port Vale on 25 July 2022. The club's director of football, David Flitcroft, said that "he is a person who takes on a leadership role within a dressing room, and his character perfectly fits the mould of what we look for in our players". He was absent from the first-team squad early in the 2022–23 season as manager Darrell Clarke wanted him to building on his fitness levels. He credited Daryl Taylor for bringing him up to speed with one-on-one sessions and, speaking in October, said that he felt "probably the fittest I have felt in a long time". Massey started eleven of the Vale's opening twenty League One matches, and also made six substitute appearances, playing at right-wing-back and in an advanced role. He scored the only goal of the game in the Boxing day fixture at home with Morecambe, a strike from 20 yards (18 m), having played in a variety of positions during the match. In January he was played as a central striker and provided a pre-assist during a 3–1 win at Forest Green Rovers on New Year's Day. Massey finished the campaign with two goals in 47 appearances as the Vale posted an 18th-place finish, with the player concluding that "the start of the season was [good], and the second half has been disappointing".

Speaking on 18 December 2023, manager Andy Crosby said that he took some of the responsibility for the player's "difficult time at the club" as he had played him out of position at the start of the 2023–24 season, but added that he made "his best performance for the club" in a more attacking wing-back role in a 3–2 win over former club Wigan Athletic two days prior. He was not retained by new manager Darren Moore at the end of the season.

=== AFC Fylde ===
On 6 September 2024, Massey joined National League club AFC Fylde, where manager Chris Beech said that "it's a real statement for us to sign someone of this pedigree". Massey commented that "the gaffer has been really positive towards me which I haven't had for a while". On 5 October, he scored his first two goals for the Coasters in a 5–2 win over Aldershot Town at Mill Farm. He scored six goals in 40 games during the 2024–25 campaign, which ended in relegation for the club, and was released upon the expiry of his contract.

=== Bury ===
On 4 September 2025, Massey joined Northern Premier League side Bury. He made his debut whilst still suspended from a sending off he got at AFC Fylde, which led to the game being replayed without him. Bury won promotion as champions at the end of the 2025–26 season. He was released upon the expiry of his contract. In September 2026, Massey announced his retirement.

== Personal life ==
Massey stated in an October 2022 interview that he had no hobbies, saying "I've got two kids that keep me occupied".

== Career statistics ==
As of match played 25 April 2026

Appearances and goals by club, season and competition
Club	Season	League			FA Cup		League Cup		Other		Total	
Club	Season	Division	Apps	Goals	Apps	Goals	Apps	Goals	Apps	Goals	Apps	Goals
Watford	2009–10	Championship	1	0	0	0	0	0	—		1	0
Watford	2010–11	Championship	3	0	1	0	0	0	—		4	0
Watford	2011–12	Championship	3	0	0	0	1	0	—		4	0
Watford	Total		7	0	1	0	1	0	—		9	0
Wealdstone (loan)	2010–11	Isthmian League; Premier Division	6	1	—		—		—		6	1
Yeovil Town (loan)	2011–12	League One	16	3	—		—		1 (Note: Appearances in Football League Trophy)	0	17	3
Colchester United (loan)	2011–12	League One	8	0	—		—		—		8	0
Colchester United	2012–13	League One	40	6	1	0	0	0	0	0	41	6
Colchester United	2013–14	League One	30	3	0	0	0	0	1	0	31	3
Colchester United	2014–15	League One	46	7	3	1	1	0	1	0	51	8
Colchester United	2015–16	League One	42	4	4	0	1	0	0	0	47	4
Colchester United	Total		166	20	8	1	2	0	2	0	178	21
Leyton Orient	2016–17	League Two	36	8	1	0	1	0	1 (Note: Appearance in EFL Trophy)	0	39	8
Wigan Athletic	2017–18	League One	42	6	8	0	0	0	0	0	50	6
Wigan Athletic	2018–19	Championship	20	5	0	0	0	0	—		20	5
Wigan Athletic	2019–20	Championship	31	0	1	0	1	0	—		33	0
Wigan Athletic	2020–21	League One	16	0	1	0	0	0	0	0	17	0
Wigan Athletic	2021–22	League One	33	1	4	0	3	0	6	1	46	2
Wigan Athletic	Total		142	12	14	0	4	0	6	1	166	13
Port Vale	2022–23	League One	41	2	1	0	1	0	4	0	47	2
Port Vale	2023–24	League One	40	1	3	1	4	0	4	0	51	2
Port Vale	Total		81	3	4	1	5	0	8	0	98	4
AFC Fylde	2024–25	National League	38	6	1	0	—		1 (Note: Appearance in FA Trophy)	0	40	6
Bury	2025–26	Northern Premier League; Division One West	10	2	0	0	—		2	0	12	2
Career total			502	55	29	2	13	0	21	1	565	58

== Honours ==
Wigan Athletic

- EFL League One: 2017–18, 2021–22

Bury

- Northern Premier League Division One West: 2025–26
