= Thomas Edwards (silversmith) =

American silversmith (1701–1755)

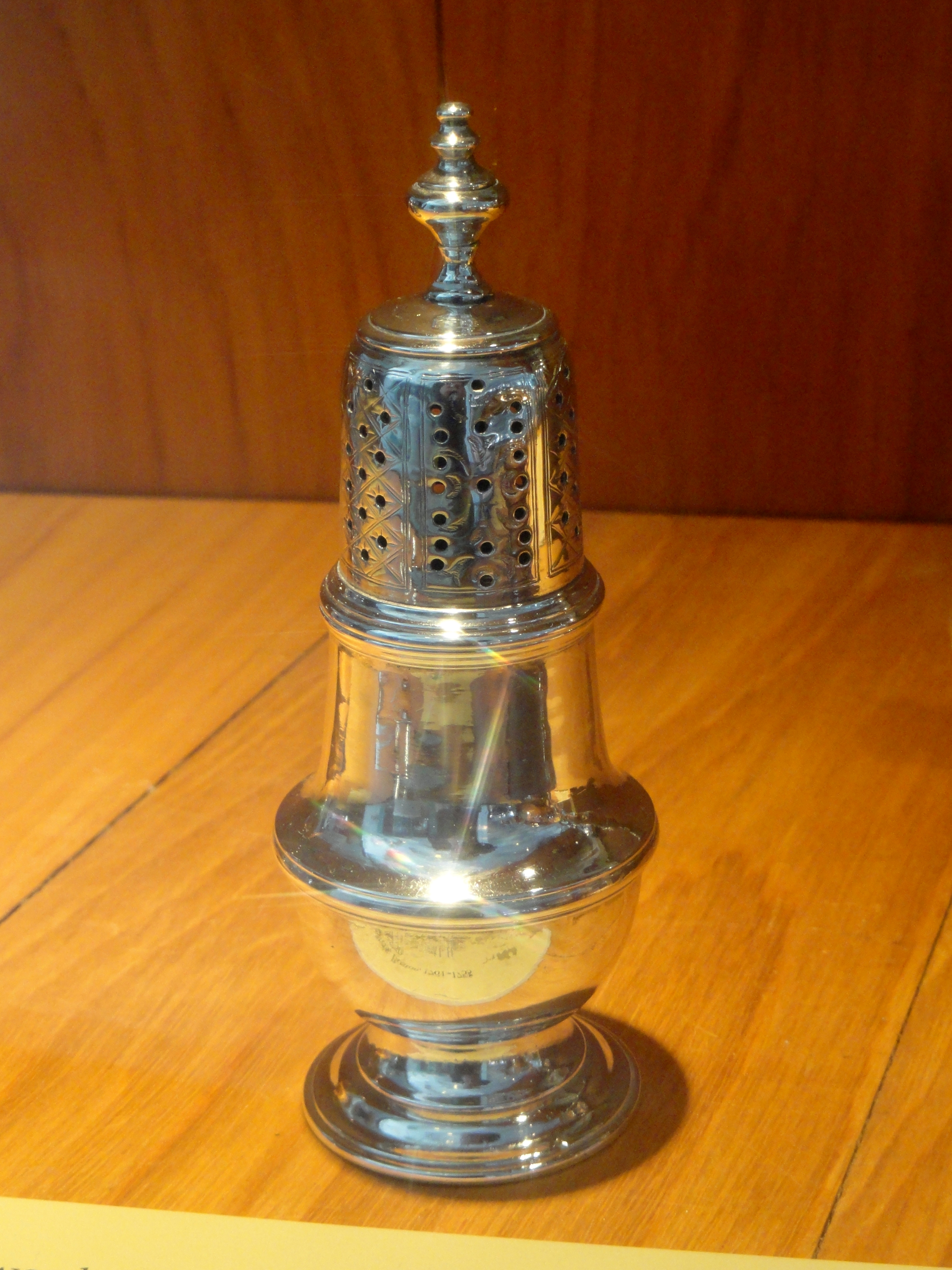
Caster by Thomas Edwards, c. 1750

Thomas Edwards (January 14, 1701 - September 14, 1755) was a prominent silversmith active in colonial Boston, Massachusetts. He was a son of silversmith John Edwards, and advertised in the Boston Weekly News-Letter, May 18, 1746, that he would carry on his father's business "at the shop of the deceased." His younger brother, Samuel Edwards, was also a silversmith, as was his son, Joseph Edwards Jr. Edwards served over time as Third Sergeant (1729), Ensign (1747), Lieutenant (1750), and Captain (1753) of the Ancient and Honorable Artillery Company of Massachusetts. His work is collected in the Museum of Fine Arts, Boston, Brooklyn Museum, and Winterthur Museum.
