= Momodou Touray =

Gambian-born Welsh footballer

Personal information
- Full name: Momodou Touray
- Date of birth: 30 July 1999 (age 27)
- Place of birth: Serekunda, Gambia
- Height: 1.74 m (5 ft 9 in)
- Position: Forward

Team information
- Current team: Bury

Youth career
- Newport County

Senior career*
| Years | Team | Apps | (Gls) |
| 2017–2020 | Newport County | 1 | (0) |
| 2017–2018 | → Merthyr Town (loan) | 7 | (4) |
| 2018–2019 | → Barry Town United (loan) | 31 | (13) |
| 2019 | → Torquay United (loan) | 1 | (0) |
| 2019–2020 | → Barry Town United (loan) | 20 | (3) |
| 2020–2022 | Salford City | 0 | (0) |
| 2020 | → Marine (loan) | 4 | (3) |
| 2021–2022 | → Bath City (loan) | 14 | (1) |
| 2022 | → Hereford (loan) | 18 | (1) |
| 2022–2023 | Marine | 13 | (0) |
| 2023 | → Warrington Rylands (loan) | 10 | (5) |
| 2023–2024 | Warrington Rylands | 36 | (17) |
| 2024–2025 | Chorley | 42 | (6) |
| 2025–2026 | Southport | 0 | (0) |
| 2026– | Bury | 30 | (12) |

International career
| 2017 | Wales U19 | 5 | (2) |
| 2018–2020 | Wales U21 | 6 | (1) |
- * Club domestic league appearances and goals as of 01:41, 15 January 2026 (UTC)

Momodou Touray (born 30 July 1999) is a footballer who plays as a forward for Northern Premier League Premier Division club Bury. Born in the Gambia, he is a former Wales under-21 international.

== Playing career ==
=== Newport County ===
Touray came through the Newport County academy. In August 2017, he joined Merthyr Town on a three month loan and in January 2018 spent time on trial at Premier League club Leicester City. In April 2018 Touray signed his first professional contract with Newport County until June 2019.

Touray made his first team debut for Newport on 5 May 2018, in a 1–1 draw against Carlisle United in the final League Two match of the season at Brunton Park as a second-half substitute.

In July 2018 Touray joined Welsh Premier League side Barry Town United on loan until the end of the 2018–19 season. Touray scored 14 goals for Barry in all competitions and he was selected as the Welsh Premier League Young Player of the Year.

On 2 August 2019 Touray joined Torquay United on a one month loan. On 2 September 2019 he returned to Barry town United on loan until the end of the 2019-20 season.

Touray was released by Newport County at the end of the 2019–20 season.

=== Salford City ===
During the summer of 2020 he trained with Salford City and appeared in a pre-season friendly for the club. It was confirmed later that he had joined the club as a member of their development squad. He made his competitive debut for the club on 9 September 2020 in a EFL Trophy game against Manchester United Under-21s.

In September 2020 he joined Marine on loan until January 2021. In August 2021, he moved on loan to National League South club Bath City until January 2022, and scored 43 minutes into his début on 15 August, scoring the opening goal in a 3–0 win against Billericay Town, but picked up an injury and was substituted after nine minutes against Tonbridge Angels the following matchday.

On 22 January 2022, Touray joined National League North side Hereford on loan for the remainder of the 2021–22 season.

=== Non-League ===
He was released by Salford at the end of the 2021–22 season and then joined Marine. He went on loan to Warrington Rylands in February 2023 for a month. He left Marine in March 2023 following the conclusion of his loan spell and subsequently joined Rylands, where he was the club's top scorer for the 2023-2024 season with 18 goals across all competitions. On 1 June 2024, Touray signed for National League North club Chorley.

In January 2026 Touray signed with Bury, making his debut in the Manchester Premier Cup quarter final against Curzon Ashton. He scored on his debut in an ultimately losing effort for Bury.

== International ==
In October 2017 Touray scored on his debut for Wales under 19's in a 4–3 win against Switzerland. He made his debut for Wales under-21s in the Euro 2019 qualifying 3–1 win against Switzerland on 16 October 2018. In his last qualifying game age wise playing for the under 21s he scored as they beat Moldova in an UEFA U21 Euro 2021 qualifying match.
