= Regan Riley =

English footballer

Personal information
- Full name: Regan David Riley
- Date of birth: 12 November 2002 (age 23)
- Place of birth: Bolton, England
- Height: 1.75 m (5 ft 9 in)
- Position: Central midfielder

Team information
- Current team: Bury

Youth career
- 2011–2019: Bolton Wanderers

Senior career*
Years	Team	Apps	(Gls)
2019–2021	Bolton Wanderers	1	(0)
2021–2024	Norwich City	0	(0)
2024–	Radcliffe	0	(0)
2025-	Bury	23	(0)
- * Club domestic league appearances and goals as of 19:38, 19 September 2024 (UTC)

Regan David Riley (born 12 November 2002) is an English professional footballer who plays as a central midfielder for National League North club Radcliffe.

== Career ==
Riley joined the Bolton Wanderers F.C. Academy when he was nine years old.

On 17 August 2019, Riley made his Bolton Wanderers debut as a second-half substitute in a 5–0 loss away to Tranmere Rovers, in a Bolton team made up largely of youth players, due to financial difficulties. He returned to the U18 for the 20–21 season. Riley was used as a Substitute in the EFL Trophy against Shrewsbury Town, on 6 October 2020. In the 2–1 defeat, he replace Tom White midway through the first-half and completed the game.

On 1 February 2021, Riley joined Championship side Norwich City on a three-year contract. Norwich paid Bolton £250,000. Following the conclusion of the 2023–24 season, Riley departed the club.

On 13 September 2024, Riley joined National League North club Radcliffe on an initial one-year deal with the option for a further twelve months.

== Career statistics ==
As of match played 6 October 2020.

Appearances and goals by club, season and competition
Club	Season	League			FA Cup		League Cup		Other		Total	
Club	Season	Division	Apps	Goals	Apps	Goals	Apps	Goals	Apps	Goals	Apps	Goals
Bolton Wanderers	2019–20	League One	1	0	0	0	0	0	0	0	1	0
Bolton Wanderers	2020–21	League Two	0	0	0	0	0	0	1 (Note: Appearance(s) in the EFL Trophy.)	0	1	0
Norwich City	2020–21	Championship	0	0	0	0	—		—		0	0
Norwich City	2021–22	Premier League	0	0	0	0	0	0	—		0	0
Norwich City	2022–23	Championship	0	0	0	0	0	0	—		0	0
Career total			1	0	0	0	0	0	1	0	2	0
