= Joseph Edwards Jr. =

American silversmith (1737–1783)

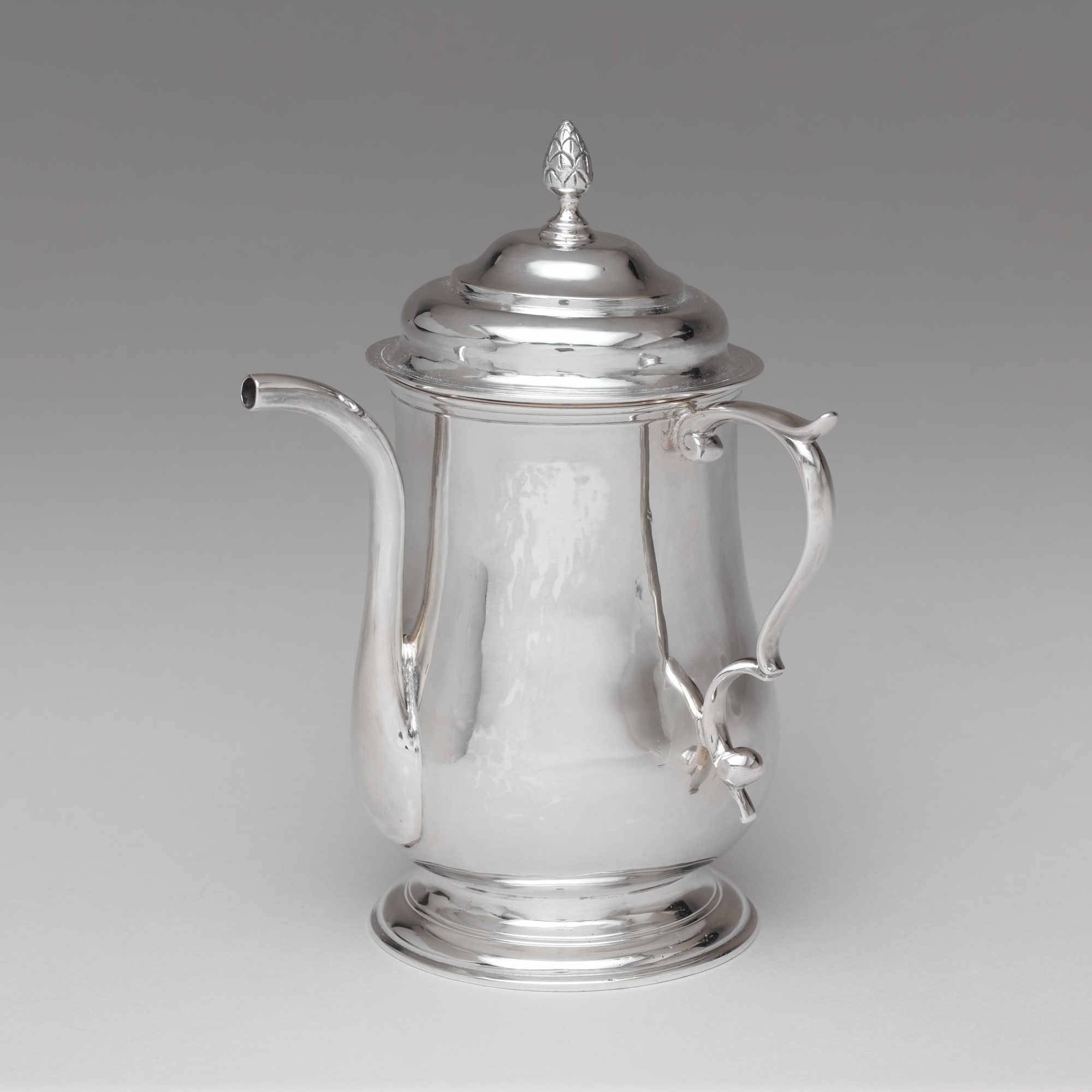
Spout cup by Joseph Edwards Jr., 1782

Joseph Edwards Jr. (November 11, 1737 – April 23, 1783) was an American silversmith, active in Boston.

Edwards was born into a distinguished family of Boston silversmiths. His grandfather, John Edwards (1671-1746), came to Boston in 1688; after his death, he was described in the Boston Evening-Post of April 14, 1746, as "John Edwards, goldsmith" and "a Gentleman of a very fair Character and well respected by all that knew him." Three of his sons - Joseph Edwards (1707-1777) senior, Samuel Edwards, and Thomas Edwards - also became silversmiths. The young Edwards appears to have apprenticed in the family, and advertised his own trade as early as 1758. According to a report in the Boston News-Letter of March 21, 1765, a thief broke into his shop and stole the following items: "34 pairs of wrought Silver Shoe Buckles, 20 pair of similar knee buckles, 6 pair of plain shoe buckles, 2 Silver Snuff Boxes, one with a Tortoise Shell Top, 9 Stock Buckles, 3 gold Necklaces, 5 gold Rings, several pair Stone Buttons, 3 pair brilliant Stone Earings, set in Gold, 5 pair gold cypher earings, several pair of silver cypher earings, several stone Rings; a Box of Gold Beads; 3 child’s Whistles; one pair of gold Buttons and 1 silver Pipe."

His work is collected in the Museum of Fine Arts, Boston, Metropolitan Museum of Art, Museum of Fine Arts, Houston, and Yale University Art Gallery.
