= Luke Tabone =

Maltese footballer

Personal information
- Full name: Luke Tabone
- Date of birth: 8 December 1997 (age 28)
- Place of birth: Malta
- Height: 1.93 m (6 ft 4 in)
- Position: Defender

Team information
- Current team: Victoria Hotspurs

Youth career
- –2016: Nadur Youngsters
- 2016–2018: Burnley

Senior career*
Years	Team	Apps	(Gls)
2018–2021	Nadur Youngsters	8	(1)
2021–2023	Gżira United	54	(1)
2023–2025	Haverfordwest County	47	(1)
2025–2026	Southport	14	(1)
2025–2026	Bury (loan)	5	(0)
2026–	Victoria Hotspurs	0	(0)

International career^{‡}
2024–	Malta	3	(0)
- * Club domestic league appearances and goals as of 22 April 2024 ‡ National team caps and goals as of 14 November 2024

Luke Tabone (born 8 December 1997) is a Maltese footballer who plays as a Defender for Victoria Hotspurs in the Maltese Challenge League and the Malta national team.

== Club career ==
Tabone began his career with the Nadur Youngsters youth team, and in 2016, left for English side Burnley. In 2018, Tabone returned to Nadur where he stayed for the next 3 years, becoming one of the best prospects in Gozitan football, before making a move to Gżira United in 2021. On 7 July 2023, Cymru Premier club Haverfordwest announced the signing of Tabone until the summer of 2025. On 13 June 2025, Southport F.C. announced the signing of Tabone until the summer of 2026, with a one year extension option.

On 8 July 2026, it was announced that Tabone joined Victoria Hotspurs.

== International career ==
Tabone was first called up for Malta in March 2023, for the UEFA European Championship qualifying matches against North Macedonia and Italy, being named on the bench for the former.

Tabone made his debut on 11 June 2024 in Malta's 0–2 loss in a friendly against Greece in Grödig, Austria. He substituted Jean Borg in the 89th minute.

== Career statistics ==
=== Club ===
As of 27 November 2023

Appearances and goals by club and year
Club	Year	Apps	Goals
Nadur Youngsters	2018-19	3	1
Nadur Youngsters	2019-20	3	0
Nadur Youngsters	2020-21	2	0
Gżira United	2021-22	22	0
Gżira United	2022-23	30	1
Haverfordwest	2023-24	18	1
Total		80	3
