= Josh Solomon-Davies =

Saint Lucian footballer

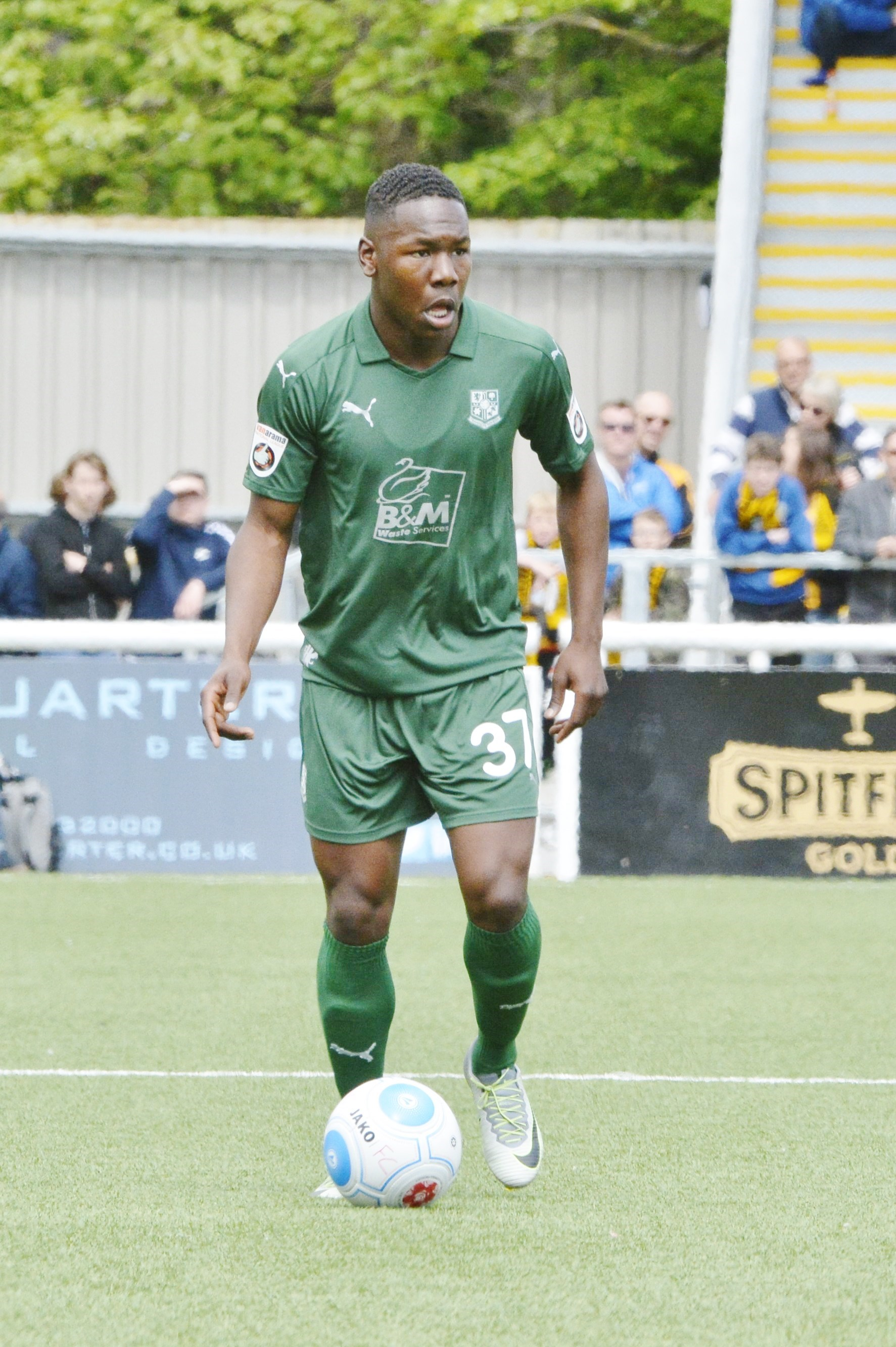
- Solomon-Davies playing with Tranmere Rovers in 2017

Personal information
- Full name: Joshua Solomon-Davies
- Date of birth: 20 November 1999 (age 26)
- Place of birth: Castries, Saint Lucia
- Position: Right back

Team information
- Current team: Vauxhall Motors
- Number: 3

Senior career*
Years	Team	Apps	(Gls)
2017–2018	Tranmere Rovers	2	(0)
2018–2019	Stalybridge Celtic	18	(1)
2019–2023	Marine	110	(2)
2023	Atherton Collieries	4	(2)
2024	Bala Town	5	(0)
2024	Atherton Collieries	10	(0)
2025–	Vauxhall Motors	5	(0)

International career^{‡}
2016-2018	St Lucia U20	6	(0)
2019–	St Lucia	14	(0)
- * Club domestic league appearances and goals as of 30 July 2025 ‡ National team caps and goals as of 23 March 2026

Joshua Solomon-Davies (born 20 November 1999) is a Saint Lucian semi-professional footballer who plays as a right back for Vauxhall Motors and the Saint Lucia national football team. In August 2023 he joined Atherton Collieries of the Northern Premier League. Previously he played for Marine in the Northern Premier League, winning promotion to the Northern Premier League Premier Division at the end of the 2021/22 season following victory in the playoff final.

== Early life ==
Solomon-Davies was born in Saint Lucia to an English father, and moved to England at the age of six. His grandfather, Carlos "Ball" Southwell was a Saint Lucian footballer.

While a pupil at St Anselm's College, Birkenhead (Edmund Rice Trust), he won the national 100 metres final in 11.3 seconds, competing in the English Schools' Athletics Championships, in Bedford, in July 2015, aged 15.

== Career ==
At age 17 Solomon-Davies made his professional debut with Tranmere Rovers in a 1–0 National League win over Maidstone United on 29 April 2017.

The following season, on 24 April 2018, Solomon-Davies made his second senior team appearance for Tranmere Rovers in the home fixture against Solihull Moors, losing 2–1.

Having declined the offer of a professional contract with Tranmere Rovers, Solomon-Davies signed with Stalybridge Celtic on 27 September 2018, on a non-contract basis.

In August 2019, he signed for Marine. Solomon-Davies appeared in every round as Marine F.C. progressed to the Third Round of the FA Cup during the 2020/21 season where they were rewarded with a home tie versus Tottenham Hotspur, the widest gap (167 places) between two competing clubs in FA Cup history. In 2023, he was part of the Marine side which won the Liverpool Senior Cup before leaving the club in May 2023.

== International career ==
On 22 October 2016, Solomon-Davies made his international debut, aged 16, for Saint Lucia's Under-20 team against Haiti in the Caribbean Union qualifying tournament for the 2017 FIFA U-20 World Cup held at the Ergilio Hato Stadium, Curaçao. Solomon-Davies went on to represent Saint Lucia throughout the tournament in subsequent games against Trinidad & Tobago and Cuba.

Solomon-Davies made his senior debut for the Saint Lucia national football team in a 1–0 friendly loss to Grenada on 28 February 2019.

== Career statistics ==
=== Club ===
As of match played 29 November 2020

Club	Season	League			FA Cup		EFL Cup		Other		Total	
Club	Season	Division	Apps	Goals	Apps	Goals	Apps	Goals	Apps	Goals	Apps	Goals
Tranmere Rovers	2016–17	National League	1	0	0	0	—		0	0	1	0
Tranmere Rovers	2017–18	National League	1	0	0	0	—		0	0	1	0
Tranmere Rovers	Total		2	0	0	0	—		0	0	2	0
Stalybridge Celtic	2018–19	Northern Premier League Premier Division	18	1	0	0	—		1 (Note: Appearances in the FA Trophy)	0	19	1
Marine	2019–20	Northern Premier League Division One North West	29	1	4	0	—		3 (Note: One appearance in the FA Trophy; one appearance in the Northern Premier League Challenge Cup; one appearance in the Liverpool Senior Cup)	0	36	1
Marine	2020–21	Northern Premier League Division One North West	2	0	5	0	—		2	0	9	0
Marine	Total		31	1	9	0	—		5	0	45	1
Career total			51	2	9	0	—		6	0	66	2

=== International ===
As of match played 2 March 2019

Appearances and goals by national team and year
National team	Year	Apps	Goals
Saint Lucia	2019	2	0
Total		2	0
