= Tim Lees =

English footballer and coach

Personal information
- Full name: Timothy Martin Lees
- Date of birth: 24 January 1986 (age 40)
- Place of birth: Billinge, Merseyside, England

Youth career
- Years: Team
- Everton
- Bolton Wanderers
2006-2008	Stalybridge Celtic		
2008–2010	Wingate & Finchley	61	(9)
2009	AFC Hayes	27	(6)
2012	Radcliffe Borough	2	(0)

Managerial career
- 2025–2026: Bury (caretaker)

Timothy Martin Lees (born 24 January 1986) is an English football player and football coach. He is currently Assistant Manager of Bury.

== Club career ==
Lees progressed through the Centre of Excellence at Everton and Bolton Wanderers before being released at schoolboy ages. His recorded non league clubs include Stalybridge Celtic, Wingate & Finchley, AFC Hayes, and Radcliffe Borough.

== Coaching career ==
Lees was employed as Technical Coach for Pepsi in 2007, working on worldwide events with players including David Beckham, Thierry Henry and Ronaldinho. In 2008 he worked as Youth Development Phase Lead at England's first daytime training model at Watford FC Academy with the 12-16 age groups. He joined Wigan Athletic in 2010 as Head of Youth Development Phase, working under Roberto Martínez for three years. During this time, he oversaw the transition from a Centre of Excellence to a Category Two academy, while also coaching at Martínez's academy in Balaguer, Spain. In 2013 he took an offer to move to Liverpool football club as part of Brendan Rodgers' academy restructure working alongside Michael Beale, Pepijn Lijnders and Alex Inglethorpe.

Lees was recruited by Kevin Kalish to become Academy Director at North America's St Louis City SC in 2015. Lees managed the u17 and u19 USA Development Programme and was also First Team coach at St Louis. In the club announcement, President Kevin Kalish said “Our staff visited Liverpool's academy in England and in Tim, we have found one of the best youth developers in the world. He has led the pathway of dozens of players who have played Internationally and at Premier League level and Tim will lead our pursuit in becoming the number one club in the country. Having worked under Roberto Martinez, Brendan Rodgers and Pepijn Lijnders, he will embed a clear style of play to the whole Academy.” The club went on to produce several Youth Internationals, homegrown MLS players and won their first US National Championship in 2017.

Lees returned to England in 2019 during the COVID-19 epidemic and became First Team Coach at Warrington Rylands, owned by Wayne Rooney's agent Paul Stretford, winning back-to-back promotions and the FA Vase at Wembley Stadium.

In September 2023, Lees was appointed Assistant Manager of Bury F.C., achieving promotion as the highest-scoring team in England for the 2024/25 season. On 2 December 2025, he stepped in as Caretaker Manager following a restructuring of the club's football staff. During this period, Lees guided Bury on a 10-game unbeaten run, lifting them from sixth to first place in the league. He later returned to his role as Assistant Manager citing personal reasons, with Anthony Johnson appointed permanent manager on 12 February 2026. Bury went on to secure back-to-back title wins for the first time in the club's 141-year history.

== Other career ==
Lees played for England semi-professional Budweiser team at the FIFA 2006 World Cup finals in Germany, selected and managed by Jamie Redknapp. He was later chosen to represent Great Britain in the Channel 4 2006 TV series The Pepsi Max World Challenge, chosen from a pool of 17,000 entrants and open to players not signed to professional football clubs. The series had a $100,000 prize for the winning country and involved David Beckham, Ronaldinho, Thierry Henry, Carlos Puyol, Roberto Carlos and Alessandro Nesta. The show, presented and narrated by Vernon Kay, took place in Rio de Janeiro, Milan, London, Madrid and Cairo. Lees has also directed and choreographed several football commercials and advertisements.
