= Djavan Pedro =

English footballer (born 2003)

Personal information
- Full name: Djavan Michael Pedro
- Date of birth: 5 December 2003 (age 22)
- Position: Striker

Team information
- Current team: Southport

Youth career
- 2020–2021: Salford City

Senior career*
Years	Team	Apps	(Gls)
2021–2024	Salford City	2	(0)
2021	→ City of Liverpool (loan)		
2022	→ Avro (loan)		
202	→ Trafford (loan)		
2022	→ Marine (loan)	13	(1)
2022–2023	→ Radcliffe (loan)	6	(0)
2023	→ Stalybridge Celtic (loan)	17	(4)
2023–2024	→ Warrington Rylands (loan)	21	(2)
2024	Buxton	7	(1)
2024	→ Bury (loan)	7	(7)
2024–	Bury	63	(29)
2026–	→ Southport (loan)	0	(0)
- * Club domestic league appearances and goals as of 19:26, 3 December 2024 (UTC)

Djavan Michael Pedro (born 5 December 2003) is an English professional footballer, who plays as a striker for National League North club Southport on loan from Northern Premier League Premier Division club Bury.

== Career ==
=== Salford City ===
Pedro joined the Salford City youth setup in 2020. While in the youth ranks, Pedro joined City of Liverpool, on a month-long loan, at the start of the 2021–22 season. On his debut, Pedro scored and assisted in a 3–3 draw with Runcorn Linnets. In January 2022, following the conclusion of his loan with City of Liverpool, Pedro joined Avro on a month-long work experience loan. Pedro would make his debut two days later, in a 2–1 victory against Runcorn Town. Pedro would also spend time on loan with Trafford. In July 2022, Pedro would sign a professional contract with Salford, after spending two years in the academy.

==== Marine (loan) ====
Prior to the 2022–23 season, Pedro joined Northern Premier League side, Marine, on a six-month loan deal. He made his debut in a 0–0 draw, against Lancaster City. Pedro scored his first and only goal for Marine in a 2–2 draw against South Shields. Despite agreeing a loan deal until January 2023, Pedro was recalled by Salford in October 2022.

==== Radcliffe (loan) ====
After being recalled from Marine, Pedro joined Radcliffe on a three-month loan deal. He made his debut on the same day, in a 1–1 draw, against Ashton United. Pedro returned to Salford at the expiration of his loan deal.

==== Stalybridge Celtic (loan) ====
In January 2023, Pedro joined Stalybridge Celtic on a month-long loan deal. Pedro made his debut and scored in a 4–0 victory against Nantwich Town. Pedro's loan was extended to the end of the season following his impressive start. Despite scoring, a 4–2 defeat to Marske United confirmed relegation for The Celts. In his final game for Stalybridge Celtic, he scored two goals in a 3–3 draw against Atherton Collieries.

==== Salford first team ====
Pedro made his debut for Salford City as a 56th-minute substitute in a 3–2 defeat to Harrogate Town. He also made a brief appearance against Premier League side, Burnley, in a 4–0 defeat in the League Cup.

In May 2024, Salford City announced that Pedro would depart the club upon the expiration of his contract.

=== Buxton ===
In June 2024, Pedro joined National League North club Buxton.

=== Bury ===
On 23 October 2024, Pedro joined North West Counties Premier Division side Bury on loan until January 2025.

On 25 November 2024, having scored seven goals in nine matches, he signed for the club permanently for an undisclosed fee.

=== Southport ===
On 8 January 2026, it was announced that Pedro would join National League North club Southport on loan until the end of the season.

== Career statistics ==
As of end of 2023–24 season

Appearances and goals by club, season and competition
Club	Season	League			FA Cup		League Cup		Other		Total	
Club	Season	Division	Apps	Goals	Apps	Goals	Apps	Goals	Apps	Goals	Apps	Goals
Salford City	2022–23	League Two	0	0	0	0	0	0	0	0	0	0
Salford City	2023–24	League Two	2	0	0	0	1	0	1 (Note: Appearance(s) in EFL Trophy)	0	4	0
Salford City	Total		2	0	0	0	1	0	1	0	4	0
Marine (loan)	2022–23	Northern Premier League	13	1	2	0	—		1 (Note: Appearance in the FA Trophy)	0	16	1
Radcliffe (loan)	2022–23	Northern Premier League	6	0	0	0	—		0	0	6	0
Stalybridge Celtic (loan)	2022–23	Northern Premier League	17	4	0	0	—		0	0	17	4
Warrington Rylands (loan)	2023–24	NPL Premier Division	20	2	0	0	—		1 (Note: Appearance(s) in NPL Premier Division play-offs)	0	21	2
Career total			58	7	2	0	1	0	3	0	64	7
