= Aaron Chalmers (footballer) =

English footballer (born 1991)

Personal information
- Full name: Aaron Anthony Chalmers
- Date of birth: 2 February 1991 (age 35)
- Place of birth: Manchester, England
- Height: 1.78 m (5 ft 10 in)
- Position: Centre midfielder

Team information
- Current team: Stalybridge Celtic

Youth career
- Bolton Wanderers
- Oldham Athletic

Senior career*
Years	Team	Apps	(Gls)
2007–2008	Oldham Athletic	2	(0)
2009	Macclesfield Town	0	(0)
2009–2010	Hibernian	0	(0)
2010–2011	Mossley	44	(1)
2011	→ Droylsden (loan)	9	(1)
2011–2012	Stockport Sports	54	(11)
2012–2013	Southport	29	(2)
2012	→ Droylsden (loan)	16	(2)
2013–2014	Ashton United	36	(9)
2014	Hyde	19	(3)
2014	Northwich Victoria	5	(1)
2015–2017	Stalybridge Celtic	91	(3)
2017–2019	Ashton United	45	(1)
2019–20??	Buxton		
2022–2024	Prestwich Heys		
2024	Stalybridge Celtic	16	(0)
2024–2025	Bury	24	(4)
2025–2026	Stalybridge Celtic	31	(5)
2026–	Stalybridge Celtic	1	(0)
- * Club domestic league appearances and goals as of 10:53, 12 October 2026 (UTC)

Aaron Anthony Chalmers (born 2 February 1991) is an English association footballer. His predominant position is as a midfielder. He retired at the end of the 2025–26 season but in October 2026 returned to Stalybridge Celtic for his fourth spell.

== Career ==
Born in Manchester, he attended Cedar Mount High School in Gorton. He started his professional career with Oldham Athletic in League One. Chalmers senior squad debut came on 12 April 2008 in a 2–0 win versus Leyton Orient, coming on as a substitute in the 74th minute for Matthew Wolfenden. His contract was cancelled on 2 December 2008 following a breach of discipline.

On 25 March 2009, he joined Macclesfield Town on non-contract terms following a trial with the club. He joined Scottish club Hibernian in 2009, where he played for their Under-19 team in central defence.

He then signed on with Mossley in the summer of 2010. He spent the end of that season on loan at Droylsden before being transfer listed in August 2011.

He was transferred for an undisclosed fee to Woodley Sports a few days later. As part of the deal, Mossley would also receive a percentage of any transfer fee received, should he later leave Woodley. The club was renamed in 2012 as Stockport Sports. On 1 July 2012, he signed for Southport. In September, he went on loan to Droylsden.

On 7 August 2014, Chalmers signed for Conference North newcomers Hyde. He made his debut two days later in a 1–0 defeat to Oxford City.

In September 2014 he joined Northwich Victoria making his club debut in a match against Ossett Town.

He left Stalybridge Celtic at the end of the 2016/17 season.

He subsequently rejoined Aston United, and played for Buxton before he joined Prestwich Heys, becoming club captain and winning player of the year awards, before rejoining Stalybridge Celtic.

In December 2024 he joined Bury.

In early November 2025 he returned to Stalybridge Celtic for a third spell. At the end of the season he announced his retirement from playing. He returned to the club for his fourth spell in October 2026, reversing his decision to retire.
