= List of foreign EFL Championship players =

This is a list of foreign players in the EFL Championship, which commenced play in 2004. The following players must meet both of the following two criteria:

1. Have played at least one Championship game. Players who were signed by Championship clubs, but only played in lower league, cup and/or European games, or did not play in any competitive games at all, are not included.
2. Are considered foreign, i.e., outside Great Britain and Ireland, determined by the following:
- If a player has been capped on international level, the national team is used; if he has been capped by more than one country, the highest level (or the most recent) team is used. These include British/Irish players with dual citizenship.
- If a player has not been capped on international level, his country of birth is used, except those who were born abroad from British/Irish parents or moved to Great Britain/Ireland at a young age, and those who clearly indicated to have switched his nationality to another nation.

Clubs listed are those the player has played at least one Championship game for—and seasons are those the player has played at least one Championship game in. Note that seasons, not calendar years, are used. For example, "2004–06" indicates that the player has played in every season from 2004–05 to 2005–06, but not necessarily every calendar year from 2004 to 2005

The players in Bold are those who are currently playing in Championship.

Last Updated: 17 August 2026

== Afghanistan ==
- **Amin Nabizada** – **Watford** 2024–

== Albania ==
- Astrit Ajdarević – Leicester City, Charlton Athletic 2009–10, 2013–14
- Geraldo Bajrami – Birmingham City 2019–20
- Flo Bojaj – Huddersfield Town 2015–16
- **Armando Broja** – **Burnley** 2026–
- Edgar Çani – Leeds United 2014–15
- Valentin Gjokaj – Derby County 2012–13
- Florian Kamberi – Huddersfield Town 2022–23
- Rey Manaj – Watford 2022–2023
- Anis Mehmeti – Wycombe Wanderers, Bristol City, Ipswich Town 2020–21, 2022–26

== Algeria ==
- Djamel Abdoun – Nottingham Forest 2013–14
- Adil Aouchiche – Sunderland, Portsmouth 2023–25
- Essaïd Belkalem – Watford 2013–14
- Mohamed Belloumi – Hull City 2024–26
- Djamel Belmadi – Southampton 2005–07
- Saïd Benrahma – Brentford 2018–21
- Hamer Bouazza – Watford, Charlton Athletic, Birmingham City, Blackpool, Millwall 2004–06, 2008–12
- Madjid Bougherra – Crewe Alexandra Sheffield Wednesday, Charlton Athletic 2005–08
- Andy Delort – Wigan Athletic 2014–15
- Rafik Djebbour – Nottingham Forest 2013–14
- Adlène Guedioura – Nottingham Forest, Watford, Middlesbrough, Sheffield United 2011–15, 2017–19, 2021–22
- Ahmed Kashi – Charlton Athletic 2015–16
- Salim Kerkar – Charlton Athletic 2012–13
- **Rayan Kolli** – **Queens Park Rangers** 2023–
- Yasser Larouci – Watford 2024–25
- Mehdi Léris – Stoke City 2023–24
- Riyad Mahrez – Leicester City 2013–14
- Karim Matmour – Huddersfield Town 2015–16
- **Camiel Neghli** – **Millwall** – 2024–
- Idriss Saadi – Cardiff City 2015–16
- El Arbi Hillel Soudani – Nottingham Forest 2018–19

== Angola ==
- Jérémie Bela – Birmingham City 2019–22
- Manuel Benson – Burnley, Swansea City 2022–23, 2024–26
- Hélder Costa – Wolverhampton Wanderers, Leeds United 2016–18, 2019–20
- Lucas João – Sheffield Wednesday, Blackburn Rovers, Reading 2015–23
- Rui Marques – Leeds United, Hull City 2005–07
- Elliot Simões – Barnsley 2019–21
- Igor Vetokele – Charlton Athletic 2014–16
- André Vidigal – Stoke City 2023–25

== Antigua and Barbuda ==
- Dexter Blackstock – Plymouth Argyle, Southampton, Derby, Queens Park Rangers, Nottingham Forest, Leeds United, Rotherham United 2004–17
- Justin Cochrane – Crewe 2005–06
- Calaum Jahraldo-Martin – Hull City 2015–16
- Marc Joseph – Hull City 2005–06
- Mikele Leigertwood – Crystal Palace, Sheffield United, Queens Park Rangers, Reading 2005–06, 2007–12, 2013–14
- Josh Parker – Queens Park Rangers, Wycombe Wanderers 2009–11, 2020–21
- Mahlon Romeo – Millwall, Cardiff City 2017–24

== Argentina ==
- Carlos Alcaraz – Southampton 2023–24
- Julio Arca – Sunderland, Middlesbrough 2004–05, 2009–13
- Luciano Becchio – Leeds United, Rotherham United 2010–13, 2014–15
- Federico Bessone – Swansea City, Leeds United, Millwall 2008–11, 2013–14
- Lucas Boyé – Reading 2019–20
- Gerardo Bruna – Blackpool 2011–13
- Emiliano Buendía – Norwich City 2018–19, 2020–21
- Julián Carranza – Leicester City 2025–26
- **Taty Castellanos** – **West Ham United** 2026–
- Luciano Civelli – Ipswich Town 2009–11
- Hugo Colace – Barnsley 2008–11
- Fabricio Coloccini – Newcastle United 2009–10
- Alejandro Faurlín – Queens Park Rangers 2009–11, 2013–14, 2015–16
- Federico Fernández – Swansea City 2018–19
- Paulo Gazzaniga – Fulham 2021–22
- Jonás Gutiérrez – Newcastle United 2009–10
- Emmanuel Ledesma – Queens Park Rangers, Middlesbrough, Rotherham United, Brighton & Hove Albion 2008–09, 2012–16
- Emiliano Martínez – Sheffield Wednesday, Rotherham United, Wolverhampton Wanderers 2013–16
- Jerónimo Morales Neumann – Barnsley 2010–11
- Gino Padula – Queens Park Rangers 2002–05
- Elian Parrino – Sheffield United 2010–11
- **Martín Payero** – Middlesbrough, **Watford** 2021–22, 2026–
- Ignacio Pussetto – Watford 2020–21
- Julián Speroni – Crystal Palace 2004–13
- Mauricio Taricco – West Ham United, Brighton & Hove Albion 2004–05, 2011–12
- Sergio Torres – Peterborough United 2009–10
- Federico Turienzo – Brighton & Hove Albion 2005–06
- Leonardo Ulloa – Brighton & Hove Albion 2012–14
- **Luis Vázquez** – **Birmingham City** 2026–
- Emanuel Villa – Derby County 2008–09
- Claudio Yacob – Nottingham Forest 2018–19
- Bruno Zuculini – Middlesbrough 2015–16

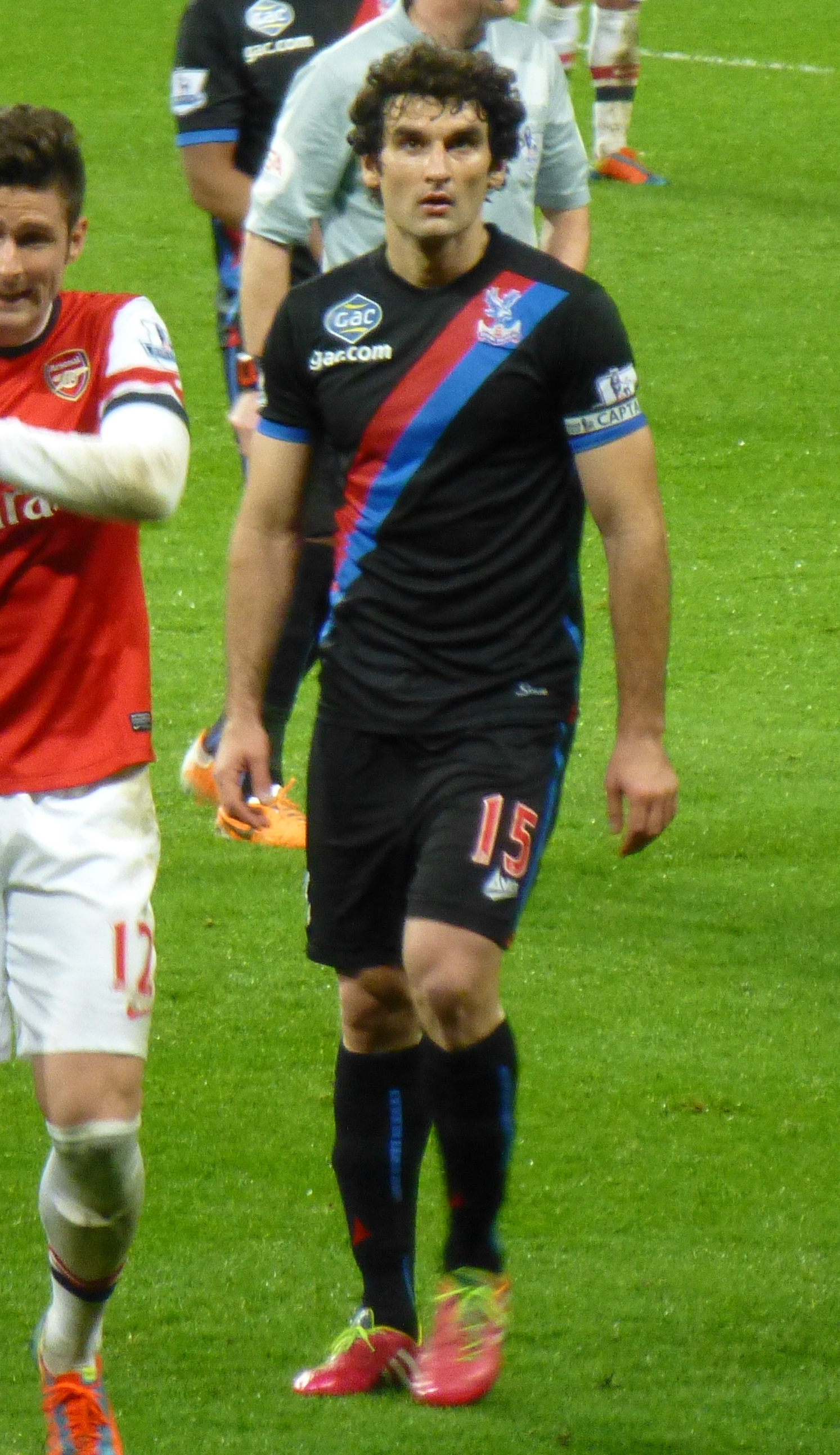
Mile Jedinak captained Crystal Palace to win the Championship play-offs in 2013.

== Australia ==
- **Kealey Adamson** – **Queens Park Rangers** 2025–
- **Daniel Bennie** – **Queens Park Rangers** 2024–
- Nicholas Bilokapic – Huddersfield Town 2022–23
- Raphael Borges Rodrigues – Coventry City 2024–26
- Dean Bouzanis – Reading 2022–23
- **Cameron Burgess** – Fulham, Ipswich Town, **Swansea City** 2014–15, 2023–24, 2025–
- Tim Cahill – Millwall 2017–18
- Nick Carle – Bristol City, Crystal Palace 2007–10
- David Carney – Sheffield United, Norwich City 2007–09
- Jacob Chapman – Huddersfield Town 2023–24
- Alex Cisak – Burnley 2013–14
- Chris Coyne – Luton Town, Colchester United 2005–08
- Jason Davidson – Huddersfield Town 2015–16
- Kenny Dougall – Barnsley, Blackpool 2019–20, 2021–23
- Ryan Edwards – Reading 2014–15
- **Callum Elder** – Brentford, Ipswich Town, Hull City, Derby County, **Lincoln City** 2016–17, 2018–20, 2021–23, 2024–
- Jacob Farrell – Portsmouth 2024–26
- Adam Federici – Reading, Stoke City 2004–06, 2008–12, 2013–15, 2018–20
- John Filan – Wigan Athletic 2004–05
- Ben Folami – Ipswich Town 2017–18
- Hayden Foxe – Leeds United 2006–07
- Tyrese Francois – Fulham 2021–22
- Richard Garcia – West Ham United, Colchester United, Hull City 2004–05, 2006–08, 2010–12
- Tom Glover – Middlesbrough 2023–25
- Joel Griffiths – Leeds United 2005–06
- Paul Henderson – Leicester City 2005–08
- Chris Herd – Bolton Wanderers, Wigan 2014–15
- **Nestory Irankunda** – **Watford** 2025–
- Jackson Irvine – Burton Albion, Hull City 2016–20
- Danny Ireland – Coventry City 2010–11
- Mile Jedinak – Crystal Palace, Aston Villa 2011–13, 2016–19
- Richard Johnson – Queens Park Rangers 2004–05
- Brad Jones – Sheffield Wednesday, Middlesbrough, Derby County 2006–07, 2009–11
- Gethin Jones – Barnsley 2016–17
- Neil Kilkenny – Birmingham City, Leeds United, Bristol City, Preston North End 2006–07, 2010–13, 2015–16
- Patrick Kisnorbo – Leicester City, Leeds United, Ipswich Town 2005–08, 2012–13
- Adrian Leijer – Norwich City, Sheffield United 2008–09, 2010–11
- Shane Lowry – Plymouth Argyle, Leeds United, Sheffield United, Millwall, Birmingham City 2009–14, 2015–16
- **Massimo Luongo** – Ipswich Town, Queens Park Rangers, Sheffield Wednesday, **Millwall** 2012–13, 2015–21, 2023–24, 2025–
- **Hayden Matthews** – **Portsmouth** 2024–
- Trent McClenahan – West Ham United, Scunthorpe United 2004–05, 2010–11
- Scott McDonald – Middlesbrough, Millwall 2009–15
- **Riley McGree** – Birmingham City, **Middlesbrough** 2020–
- Jamie McMaster – Leeds United 2004–05
- James Meredith – Millwall 2017–19
- **Lewis Miller** – **Blackburn Rovers** 2025–
- Aaron Mooy – Huddersfield Town 2016–17, 2019–20
- Kevin Muscat – Millwall 2004–05
- Lucas Neill – Watford, Doncaster Rovers 2013–14
- Tommy Oar – Ipswich Town 2015–16
- Tony Popovic – Crystal Palace 2005–06
- Paul Reid – Brighton & Hove Albion 2004–06
- **Alex Robertson** – **Cardiff City** 2024–25, 2026–
- Tom Rogic – West Bromwich 2022–23
- Samuel Silvera – Middlesbrough, Portsmouth 2023–26
- Josip Skoko – Stoke City 2005–06
- Brad Smith – Cardiff City 2019–20
- Harry Souttar – Stoke City, Leicester City, Sheffield United 2020–26
- Mile Sterjovski – Derby County 2008–09
- Danny Tiatto – Leicester City 2004–07
- **Mohamed Toure** – **Norwich City** 2025–
- Tony Vidmar – Cardiff City 2004–05
- **Thomas Waddingham** – **Portsmouth** 2024–
- Nick Ward – Queens Park Rangers 2006–08
- James Wesolowski – Leicester City 2005–08
- Rhys Williams – Burnley, Middlesbrough, Charlton Athletic 2008–16
- Bailey Wright – Preston North End, Bristol City, Sunderland, Rotherham United 2010–11, 2015–20, 2022–23
- Kusini Yengi – Portsmouth 2024–25
- Ruben Zadkovich – Derby County 2008–09

== Austria ==
- Emanuel Aiwu – Birmingham City 2023–24
- Daniel Bachmann – Watford 2020–21, 2022–25
- Thierno Ballo – Millwall 2025–26
- Moritz Bauer – Stoke City 2018–19
- Guido Burgstaller – Cardiff City 2014–15
- Marco Djuricin – Brentford 2015–16
- Johannes Ertl – Crystal Palace, Sheffield United 2008–11
- Dominik Frieser – Barnsley 2020–22
- Besian Idrizaj – Luton Town, Crystal Palace, Swansea City 2006–08, 2009–10
- Konstantin Kerschbaumer – Brentford 2015–17
- **Christoph Klarer** – **Birmingham City** 2025–
- Christoph Knasmüllner – Barnsley 2017–18
- Ivan Lučić – Bristol City 2016–17
- Michael Madl – Fulham 2015–17
- Stefan Maierhofer – Bristol City, Millwall 2009–10, 2013–14
- **Souleyman Mandey** – **West Bromwich Albion** 2025–
- Georg Margreitter – Wolverhampton Wanderers 2012–13
- Bobby Olejnik – Peterborough United 2012–13
- Emanuel Pogatetz – Middlesbrough 2009–10
- Martin Pušić – Hull City 2011–12
- Marcel Ritzmaier – Barnsley 2019–21
- Samuel Şahin-Radlinger – Barnsley 2019–20
- **Nicolas Schmid** – **Portsmouth** 2024–
- Patrick Schmidt – Barnsley 2019–21
- Michael Sollbauer – Barnsley 2019–21
- Andreas Weimann – Watford, Derby County, Wolverhampton, Bristol City, West Bromwich Albion, Blackburn Rovers 2010–12, 2015–26
- Maximilian Wöber – Leeds United 2024–25
- Hannes Wolf – Swansea City 2021–22

== Bangladesh ==
- **Hamza Choudhury** – Burton Albion, Watford, Leicester City, **Sheffield United** 2016–17, 2022–

== Barbados ==
- Jamal Blackman – Sheffield United, Rotherham United, Huddersfield Town 2017–18, 2020–22
- Nick Blackman – Blackpool, Reading, Derby County 2008–09, 2013–17
- Emmerson Boyce – Crystal Palace, Wigan Athletic 2005–06, 2013–15
- Jonathan Forte – Scunthorpe United, Southampton 2007–08, 2009–12
- **Thierry Gale** – **Bolton Wanderers** 2026–
- Hallam Hope – Sheffield Wednesday 2014–15
- Paul Ifill – Millwall, Sheffield United, Crystal Palace 2004–06, 2007–09
- Mark McCammon – Millwall, Brighton & Hove Albion 2004–06
- Krystian Pearce – Peterborough United 2009–10

== Belgium ==
- Enock Agyei – Burnley 2024–25
- Ameen Al-Dakhil – Burnley 2022–23
- Norman Bassette – Coventry City 2024–25
- Geoffrey Mujangi Bia – Watford 2012–13
- Yoni Buyens – Charlton Athletic 2014–15
- Florent Cuvelier – Peterborough United 2012–13
- Laurens De Bock – Leeds United 2017–18
- Brian De Keersmaecker – Oxford United 2025–26
- Ritchie De Laet – Preston North End, Portsmouth, Leicester City, Middlesbrough, Aston Villa 2010–11, 2012–14, 2015–18
- **Dion De Neve** – **Blackburn Rovers** 2025–
- **Casper De Norre** – **Millwall** 2023–
- Steve De Ridder – Southampton, Bolton Wanderers 2011–13
- Julien De Sart – Middlesbrough, Derby County 2015–17
- Pierre Dwomoh – Watford 2024–26
- **Arne Engels** – **West Ham United** 2026–
- Wout Faes – Leicester City 2023–24, 2025–26
- Faris Haroun – Middlesbrough, Blackpool 2011–14
- Carl Hoefkens – Stoke City, West Bromwich Albion 2005–08
- Junior – Stoke City 2005–06
- Christian Kabasele – Watford 2020–21, 2022–23
- **Thomas Kaminski** – Blackburn Rovers, Luton Town, **Charlton Athletic** 2020–23, 2024–
- Christophe Lepoint – Charlton 2014–15
- Aaron Leya Iseka – Barnsley 2021–22
- Eliot Matazo – Hull City 2024–26
- Isaac Mbenza – Huddersfield Town 2019–21
- Franck Moussa – Leicester City, Doncaster Rovers, Charlton Athletic 2010–12, 2014–16
- Émile Mpenza – Plymouth Argyle 2008–09
- Julien Ngoy – Stoke City 2019–20
- Vadis Odjidja-Ofoe – Norwich City 2014–15
- Tyrese Omotoye – Norwich City 2020–21
- Obbi Oularé – Barnsley 2021–22
- Bob Peeters – Millwall 2004–05
- Sébastien Pocognoli – Brighton & Hove Albion 2016–17
- Dennis Praet – Leicester City 2023–24
- **Largie Ramazani** – Leeds United, **Burnley** 2024–25, 2026–
- Jeffrey Rentmeister – Blackpool 2014–15
- Matz Sels – Newcastle United 2016–17
- Jack Senga – Reading 2022–23
- **Mathis Servais** – **Millwall** 2026–
- **Mike Trésor** – **Burnley** 2026–
- Marnick Vermijl – Sheffield Wednesday, Preston North End 2014–18
- Thibaud Verlinden – Stoke City 2018–21
- Jelle Vossen – Middlesbrough, Burnley 2014–16

== Benin ==
- Sessi D'Almeida – Barnsley 2016–17
- Rudy Gestede – Cardiff City, Blackburn Rovers, Aston Villa, Middlesbrough 2011–15, 2016–20
- Frédéric Gounongbe – Cardiff City 2016–18
- **Andréas Hountondji** – **Burnley** 2024–25, 2026–
- Réda Johnson – Plymouth Argyle, Sheffield Wednesday 2009–10, 2012–14
- Steve Mounié – Huddersfield Town 2019–20

== Bermuda ==
- Ajani Burchall – Bournemouth – 2020–21
- Shaun Goater – Reading, Coventry City 2003–05
- Reggie Lambe – Ipswich Town 2009–11
- Nahki Wells – Huddersfield Town, Queens Park Rangers, Bristol City 2013–17, 2018–25

== Bosnia and Herzegovina ==
- **Anel Ahmedhodžić** – Nottingham Forest, Sheffield United, **Burnley** 2016–17, 2022–23, 2024–25, 2026–
- Asmir Begović – Ipswich Town, Bournemouth, Queens Park Rangers, Leicester City 2009–10, 2020–21, 2023–24, 2025–26
- Muhamed Bešić – Middlesbrough 2017–19
- Milan Đurić – Bristol City 2016–18
- Amir Hadžiahmetović – Hull City 2025–26
- Nikola Katić – Plymouth Argyle 2024–25
- Muhamed Konjić – Derby County 2004–05
- **Vladan Kovačević** – **Norwich City** 2025–
- Mario Vrančić – Norwich City, Stoke City 2017–19, 2020–22

== Brazil ==
- Adryan – Leeds United 2014–15
- Anderson de Silva – Barnsley 2007–10
- **André** – **Wolverhampton Wanderers** 2026–
- Felipe Araruna – Reading 2019–22
- Adriano Basso – Bristol City, Hull City 2006–10, 2011–12
- Léo Bonatini – Wolverhampton, Nottingham Forest 2017–19
- **Neto Borges** – **Middlesbrough**, Bristol City 2024–
- Rafael Cabral – Reading 2019–22
- **Esquerdinha** – **Queens Park Rangers** 2025–
- Evandro – Hull City 2017–19
- Fabio – Cardiff City, Middlesbrough 2014–16, 2017–18
- Heurelho Gomes – Watford 2014–15
- Guly – Southampton 2011–12
- **Igor Julio** – **Burnley** 2026–
- Iriney – Watford 2013–14
- José Júnior – Derby County, Rotherham United 2004–05
- **Pedro Lima** – **Wolverhampton Wanderers** 2026–
- Matheus Martins – Watford 2022–24
- Marquinhos – Norwich City 2022–23
- **Morato** – **West Ham United** 2026–
- André Moritz – Crystal Palace, Bolton Wanderers 2011–14
- Neuton – Watford 2012–13
- João Pedro – Watford 2020–21, 2022–23
- Rodrigo Muniz – Fulham 2021–22
- Matheus Pereira – West Bromwich Albion 2019–20
- Lincoln – Hull City 2024–25
- Gustavo Nunes – Swansea City 2025–26
- Lucas Piazon – Reading, Fulham 2015–18
- **Lucas Pires** – **Burnley** 2024–25, 2026–
- Bruno Ribeiro – Blackburn Rovers 2012–13
- **Ronald** – **Swansea City** 2023–
- Sandro – Queens Park Rangers 2015–16
- Hevertton Santos – Queens Park Rangers 2024–25
- Gabriel Sara – Norwich City – 2022–24
- **Léo Scienza** – **Southampton** 2025–
- Guilherme Siqueira – Sheffield Wednesday 2025–26
- Wellington Silva – Bolton Wanderers 2015–16
- Dennis Souza – Barnsley, Doncaster Rovers 2007–09, 2010–11
- Vinícius Souza – Sheffield United 2024–25
- Emerson Thome – Wigan Athletic, Derby County 2004–06
- Vitinho – Burnley 2022–23, 2024–25
- **Welington** – **Southampton** 2025–
- Wesley – Stoke City 2023–24

== Bulgaria ==
- Nikolay Bodurov – Fulham 2014–16
- Dimitar Evtimov – Nottingham Forest 2013–14, 2015–16
- Ilia Gruev – Leeds United 2023–25
- Sylvester Jasper – Fulham 2019–20
- Radostin Kishishev – Leeds United, Leicester City 2006–08
- Filip Krastev – Oxford United 2025–26
- Martin Petrov – Bolton Wanderers 2012–13
- Simeon Slavchev – Bolton Wanderers 2014–15
- Svetoslav Todorov – Charlton Athletic 2007–09
- Aleksandar Tunchev – Leicester City, Crystal Palace 2009–12

== Burkina Faso ==
- Habib Bamogo – Doncaster Rovers 2011–12
- **Nasser Djiga** – **Wolverhampton Wanderers** 2026–
- **Issa Kaboré** – **Wrexham** 2025–
- **Bertrand Traoré** – **Wolverhampton Wanderers** 2026–

== Burundi ==
- Saido Berahino – Peterborough United, Stoke City 2012–13, 2018–19
- Gaël Bigirimana – Coventry City 2011–12

== Cameroon ==
- Benoît Assou-Ekotto – Queens Park Rangers 2013–14
- Sébastien Bassong – Watford, Norwich City 2014–15, 2016–17
- Gaëtan Bong – Wigan Athletic, Brighton & Hove Albion, Nottingham Forest 2014–17, 2019–22
- Steve Leo Beleck – Watford 2012–13
- André Bikey-Amougou – Reading, Burnley, Bristol City, Middlesbrough, Charlton Athletic 2008–09, 2010–13, 2014–15
- Serge Branco – Queens Park Rangers 2004–05
- Eric Djemba-Djemba – Burnley 2006–07
- Roudolphe Douala – Plymouth Argyle 2008–09
- George Elokobi – Colchester United, Wolverhampton Wanderers, Nottingham Forest, Bristol City 2006–09, 2011–13
- Cedric Evina – Charlton Athletic 2012–14
- Jeando Fuchs – Peterborough United 2021–22
- Geremi – Newcastle United 2009–10
- **Kévin Keben** – **Watford** 2024–
- James Léa Siliki – Middlesbrough 2021–22
- Bryan Mbeumo – Brentford 2019–21
- Harold Moukoudi – Middlesbrough 2019–20
- Danny Namaso – Reading 2018–20
- Olivier Ntcham – Swansea City 2021–23
- Allan Nyom – West Bromwich Albion – 2018–19
- Franck Songo'o – Preston North End, Crystal Palace, Sheffield Wednesday 2006–08
- Patrick Suffo – Coventry City 2004–05
- **Junior Tchamadeu** – **Stoke City** 2023–
- **Jackson Tchatchoua** – **Wolverhampton Wanderers** 2026–
- **Darlin Yongwa** – **Norwich City** 2026–
- André-Frank Zambo Anguissa – Fulham 2021–22

== Canada ==
- Sam Adekugbe – Brighton & Hove Albion 2016–17
- **Ali Ahmed** – **Norwich City** 2025–
- Scott Arfield – Huddersfield Town, Burnley 2012–14, 2015–16
- **Theo Bair** – **Bolton Wanderers** 2026–
- Marc Bircham – Queens Park Rangers 2004–07
- Jim Brennan – Norwich, Southampton 2005–06
- Theo Corbeanu – Blackpool 2022–23
- Jason de Vos – Ipswich Town 2004–08
- David Edgar – Swansea City, Burnley, Birmingham City, Huddersfield Town 2009–15
- **Stephen Eustáquio** – **Swansea City** 2026–
- Doneil Henry – Blackburn Rovers 2014–16
- Lars Hirschfeld – Leicester City – 2004–05
- Junior Hoilett – Queens Park Rangers, Cardiff City, Reading 2013–14, 2015–18, 2019–23
- Iain Hume – Leicester City, Barnsley, Preston North End 2004–11
- Simeon Jackson – Norwich City, Millwall, Blackburn Rovers 2010–11, 2013–14, 2015–16
- Daniel Jebbison – Sheffield United, Watford, Preston North End 2021–23, 2024–26
- **Alfie Jones** – Hull City, **Middlesbrough** 2021–
- Ismaël Koné – Watford 2022–24
- Jamie Knight-Lebel – Bristol City 2023–24
- **Cyle Larin** – **Southampton** 2025–
- Richie Laryea – Nottingham Forest 2021–22
- Jayson Leutwiler – Middlesbrough, Blackburn Rovers 2013–14, 2018–19
- **Liam Millar** – Preston North End, Hull City, **Birmingham City** 2023–
- **Jayden Nelson** – **Bolton Wanderers** 2026–
- Paul Peschisolido – Derby County 2004–07
- Jaime Peters – Ipswich Town 2005–12
- Michael Petrasso – Queens Park Rangers 2013–14, 2015–17
- Adrian Serioux – Millwall 2004–05
- Josh Simpson – Millwall 2004–06
- Kris Twardek – Millwall 2017–18
- Iké Ugbo – Barnsley, Cardiff City, Sheffield Wednesday 2017–18, 2023–26

== Cape Verde ==
- Alessio da Cruz – Sheffield Wednesday 2019–20
- Nuno da Costa – Nottingham Forest 2019–21
- Ryan Mendes – Nottingham Forest 2015–16
- Pelé – Southampton, West Bromwich Albion 2006–08
- Hildeberto Pereira – Nottingham Forest 2016–17
- Georges Santos – Queens Park Rangers 2004–06
- Ricardo Santos – Swansea City 2025–26

== Central African Republic ==
- Habib Habibou – Leeds United 2012–13
- Kelly Youga – Charlton Athletic 2007–09

== Chile ==
- Jean Beausejour – Birmingham City, Wigan Athletic 2011–12, 2013–14
- **Ben Brereton Díaz** – Nottingham Forest, Blackburn Rovers, **Sheffield United**, Derby County, Southampton 2016–23, 2024–
- Juan Delgado – Sheffield Wednesday 2023–24
- Gonzalo Jara – West Bromwich Albion, Brighton & Hove Albion, Nottingham Forest 2009–10, 2011–14
- Marcelino Núñez – Norwich City, Ipswich Town 2022–26
- Vicente Reyes – Norwich City 2024–25
- Francisco Sierralta – Watford 2020–21, 2022–25
- **Lawrence Vigouroux** – **Swansea City** 2024–

== China ==
- Tyias Browning – Wigan Athletic, Preston North End, Sunderland – 2013–14, 2016–18
- Sun Jihai – Sheffield United 2008–09
- Nico Yennaris – Bournemouth, Brentford 2012–13, 2014–19
- Zheng Zhi – Charlton Athletic 2007–09

== Chinese Taipei ==
- Tim Chow – Wigan Athletic 2014–15, 2016–17

== Colombia ==
- Steven Alzate – Hull City 2024–25
- Yáser Asprilla – Watford 2022–24
- Ángelo Balanta – Queens Park Rangers 2007–10
- Óscar Estupiñán – Hull City – 2022–25
- David González – Leeds United, Brighton & Hove Albion, Barsnley 2010–13
- Jefferson Lerma – Bournemouth – 2020–22
- **Yerson Mosquera** – **Wolverhampton Wanderers** 2026–
- Ian Poveda – Leeds United, Blackburn Rovers, Blackpool, Sheffield Wednesday, Sunderland 2019–20, 2021–25
- Gustavo Puerta – Hull City 2024–25
- Hugo Rodallega – Fulham 2014–15
- Carlos Sánchez – Watford 2020–21
- Luis Sinisterra – Leeds United 2023–24
- **Jhon Solís** – **Birmingham City** 2025–
- Devis Vásquez – Sheffield Wednesday 2023–24
- Jhon Viáfara – Southampton 2006–08

== Comoros ==
- Nadjim Abdou – Plymouth Argyle, Millwall 2007–08, 2010–15
- Fouad Bachirou – Nottingham Forest 2020–21
- **Iyad Mohamed** – **Portsmouth** 2026–
- **Rafiki Said** – **Wolverhampton Wanderers** 2026–

== Congo (Republic of the Congo) ==
- Amine Linganzi – Preston North End 2011–12
- Christ Makosso – Luton Town, Oxford United 2024–26
- Maheta Molango – Brighton & Hove Albion 2004–05
- Prince Oniangué – Wolverhampton Wanderers 2016–18
- Christopher Samba – Aston Villa 2017–18

== Congo DR (Democratic Republic of the Congo) ==
- Benik Afobe – Reading, Bolton Wanderers, Millwall, Sheffield Wednesday, Wolverhampton, Stoke City, Bristol City 2011–16, 2017–23
- Britt Assombalonga – Watford, Nottingham Forest, Middlesbrough 2011–12, 2014–21, 2022–23
- Beni Baningime – Wigan, Derby County – 2018–19, 2020–21
- Cédric Baseya – Southampton, Reading 2007–08, 2011–12
- Samuel Bastien – Burnley 2022–23
- Yannick Bolasie – Plymouth Argyle, Bristol City, Crystal Palace, Aston Villa, Middlesbrough, Swansea City 2009–10, 2011–13, 2018–19, 2020–21, 2023–24
- Jordan Botaka – Leeds United 2015–16
- Grady Diangana – West Bromwich Albion 2019–20, 2021–25
- Hérita Ilunga – West Ham United, Doncaster Rovers 2011–12
- Elias Kachunga – Huddersfield Town, Sheffield Wednesday 2016–17, 2019–21
- Aldo Kalulu – Swansea City 2019–20
- Trésor Kandol – Leeds United, Charlton Athletic 2006–07, 2008–09
- Patrick Kanyuka – Queens Park Rangers 2005–08
- **Edo Kayembe** – **Watford** 2022–
- Neeskens Kebano – Fulham, Middlesbrough 2016–18, 2019–22
- Peter Kioso – Luton Town, Rotherham United, Oxford United 2019–20, 2021–25
- Jason Lokilo – Hull City 2023–24
- Kazenga LuaLua – Doncaster Rovers, Newcastle United, Brighton & Hove Albion, Queens Park Rangers, Sunderland, Luton Town 2009–10, 2011–18, 2019–21
- Beryly Lubala – Birmingham City 2017–19
- Lomana LuaLua – Blackpool 2011–12
- Jacques Maghoma – Sheffield Wednesday, Birmingham City 2013–20
- Yves Ma-Kalambay – Swansea City 2010–11
- **Stephy Mavididi** – Preston North End, Leicester City, **Watford** 2017–18, 2023–24, 2025–
- Youssouf Mulumbu – West Bromwich Albion 2009–10, 2015–17
- Yeni Ngbakoto – Queens Park Rangers 2016–17
- Guylain Ndumbu-Nsungu – Cardiff City 2005–06
- Granddi Ngoyi – Leeds United 2014–15
- Aristote Nsiala – Ipswich Town 2018–19
- Pelly Ruddock Mpanzu – Luton Town 2019–23, 2024–25
- Aaron Tshibola – Reading, Aston Villa, Nottingham Forest 2014–17
- Gabriel Zakuani – Stoke City, Peterborough United 2007–08, 2009–10, 2011–13

== Costa Rica ==
- Jewison Bennette – Sunderland 2022–24
- José Miguel Cubero – Blackpool 2014–16
- Bryan Oviedo – Sunderland 2017–18
- Bryan Ruiz – Fulham 2014–15
- Álvaro Saborío – Bristol City 2009–10

== Côte d'Ivoire (Ivory Coast) ==
- Zoumana Bakayogo – Leicester City, Yeovil Town 2013–14
- Sol Bamba – Leicester City, Leeds United, Cardiff City, Middlesbrough 2010–12, 2014–18, 2019–22
- Vakoun Issouf Bayo – Watford 2022–25
- Chris Bedia – Hull City 2024–25
- Jérémie Boga – Birmingham City 2017–18
- Willy Boly – Wolverhampton Wanders 2017–18
- Wilfried Bony – Swansea City 2018–19
- Cyriac – Fulham 2016–17
- Guy Demel – West Ham United 2011–12
- Amad Diallo – Sunderland 2022–23
- Aruna Dindane – Crystal Palace 2012–13
- Seko Fofana – Fulham 2014–15
- Hassane Kamara – Watford 2022–23
- Wilfried Kanga – Cardiff City 2024–25
- **Abdoulaye Kanté** – **Middlesbrough** 2025–
- Cédric Kipré – Wigan Athletic, West Bromwich Albion, Cardiff City, Ipswich Town 2018–20, 2021–24, 2025–26
- Jonathan Kodjia – Bristol City, Aston Villa 2015–19
- **Ghislain Konan** – **Wolverhampton Wanderers** 2026–
- Lamine Koné – Sunderland 2017–18
- **Richard Kone** – **Queens Park Rangers** 2025–
- Emmanuel Latte Lath – Middlesbrough 2023–25
- Abdoulaye Méïté – West Bromwich Albion, Doncaster Rovers 2009–10, 2013–14
- Yakou Méïté – Reading, Cardiff City 2016–17, 2018–25
- Abdul Razak – Portsmouth, Brighton & Hove Albion, Charlton 2011–13
- Yannick Sagbo – Wolverhampton Wanderers 2014–15
- Jean Michaël Seri – Fulham, Hull City 2021–24
- Olivier Tébily – Birmingham City 2006–07
- Christ Tiéhi – Wigan Athletic, Rotherham United 2022–24
- Cheick Tioté – Newcastle United 2016–17
- Malick Yalcouyé – Swansea City 2025–26
- Wilfried Zaha – Crystal Palace 2009–13
- François Zoko – Blackpool 2014–15

== Croatia ==
- Filip Benković – Barnsley, Cardiff City 2019–21
- Ahmet Brković – Luton Town 2005–07
- **Ante Crnac** – **Norwich City** 2024–
- Alen Halilović – Birmingham City, Reading 2020–22
- Nikica Jelavić – Hull City 2015–16
- Lovre Kalinić – Aston Villa 2018–19
- Niko Kranjčar – Queens Park Rangers 2013–14
- Filip Krovinović – West Bromwich Albion, Nottingham Forest 2019–21
- **Jakov Medić** – **Norwich City** 2025–
- **Branimir Mlačić** – **Watford** 2026–
- Ivor Pandur – Hull City 2024–26
- Ivan Paurević – Huddersfield Town 2016–17
- Stipe Perica – Watford 2020–21
- **Adrian Segecic** – **Portsmouth** 2025–
- Simon Sluga – Luton Town 2019–22
- Ivan Šunjić – Birmingham City 2019–22, 2023–24
- Filip Uremović – Sheffield United 2021–22

== Cuba ==
- Onel Hernández – Norwich City, Middlesbrough, Birmingham City, Charlton Athletic 2017–19, 2020–26

== Curaçao ==
- Kemy Agustien – Birmingham City, Swansea City, Crystal Palace, Brighton & Hove Albion 2008–09, 2010–11, 2013–15
- Vurnon Anita – Newcastle United, Leeds United 2016–18
- Juninho Bacuna – Huddersfield Town, Birmingham City 2019–24
- Leandro Bacuna – Aston Villa, Reading, Cardiff City, Watford 2016–23
- **Tahith Chong** – Birmingham City, Luton Town, **Sheffield United** 2021–23, 2024–
- **Sontje Hansen** – **Middlesbrough** 2025–
- Gervane Kastaneer – Coventry City 2020–21
- Cuco Martina – Stoke City 2018–19
- Shelton Martis – West Bromwich Albion, Scunthorpe United, Doncaster Rovers 2009–12
- Shurandy Sambo – Burnley 2024–25

== Cyprus ==
- **Marcus Edwards** – **Burnley** 2024–25, 2026–
- Nicholas Ioannou – Nottingham Forest 2020–21
- **Hector Kyprianou** – **Watford** 2025–
- Alexis Nicolas – Brighton & Hove Albion 2004–06
- Georgios Tofas – Queens Park Rangers 2010–11
- Tom Williams – Peterborough United, Queens Park Rangers, Preston North End, Bristol City 2009–11

== Czech Republic ==
- Roman Bednář – West Bromwich Albion, Leicester City, Blackpool 2007–08, 2009–12
- Patrik Berger – Stoke City 2006–07
- Radek Černý – Queens Park Rangers 2008–13
- Tomáš Egert – Burton Albion 2017–18
- Václav Hladký – Ipswich Town, Burnley 2023–25
- **Matěj Jurásek** – **Norwich City** 2024–
- Tomáš Kalas – Middlesbrough, Fulham, Bristol City 2014–23
- Martin Kolář – Stoke City 2005–06
- Libor Kozák – Aston Villa 2016–17
- **Ladislav Krejčí** – **Wolverhampton Wanderers** 2026–
- Mario Lička – Southampton 2006–08
- **Filip Lissah** – **Swansea City** 2026–
- Marek Matějovský – Reading 2008–10
- Ondřej Mazuch – Hull City 2017–19
- Tomáš Pekhart – Southampton 2008–09
- Pavel Pergl – Preston North End 2006–07
- Daniel Pudil – Watford, Sheffield Wednesday 2012–19
- Tomáš Řepka – West Ham United 2004–05
- Rudi Skácel – Southampton 2006–09
- Jiří Skalák – Brighton & Hove Albion, Millwall 2015–17, 2018–21
- **Tomáš Souček** – **West Ham United** 2026–
- Marek Štěch – Yeovil Town 2013–14
- David Střihavka – Norwich City 2007–08
- Filip Twardzik – Bolton Wanderers 2014–16
- Tomáš Vaclík – Huddersfield Town 2022–23
- **Radek Vítek** – Bristol City, **Middlesbrough** 2025–
- Matěj Vydra – Watford, Reading, Derby County 2012–13, 2014–18
- Jan Žambůrek – Brentford 2018–21

== Denmark ==
- Martin Albrechtsen – West Bromwich Albion, Derby County 2006–09
- Lucas Andersen – Queens Park Rangers 2023–25
- Mads Juel Andersen – Barnsley, Luton Town 2019–22, 2024–25
- Mikkel Andersen – Reading 2014–15
- Casper Ankergren – Leeds United, Brighton & Hove Albion 2006–07, 2011–14
- Mads Bech Sørensen – Brentford 2018–21
- Nicklas Bendtner – Birmingham City, Nottingham Forest 2006–07, 2016–17
- Jens Berthel Askou – Norwich City, Millwall 2010–11
- Philip Billing – Huddersfield Town, Bournemouth 2013–14, 2015–17, 2020–22
- Mikkel Bischoff – Wolverhampton Wanderers, Sheffield Wednesday, Coventry City 2004–07
- Morten Bisgaard – Derby County 2004–07
- Mads Bidstrup – Brentford 2020–21
- Andreas Bjelland – Brentford 2015–18
- Martin Braithwaite – Middlesbrough 2017–19
- Nicolai Brock-Madsen – Birmingham City 2015–16
- **Jacob Bruun Larsen** – **Burnley** 2026–
- Jan Budtz – Wolverhampton Wanderers 2006–07
- Oskar Buur – Wolverhampton Wanderers 2017–18
- Kim Christensen – Barnsley 2007–08
- Lasse Vigen Christensen – Fulham, Burton 2014–17
- Henrik Dalsgaard – Brentford 2017–21
- Adda Djeziri – Blackpool 2012–13
- Lukas Engel – Middlesbrough 2023–25
- Frederik Fisker Nielsen – Sheffield Wednesday 2017–18
- Per Frandsen – Wigan Athletic 2004–05
- **Oscar Fraulo** – **Derby County** 2025–
- Mads Frøkjær-Jensen – Preston North End 2023–26
- Jakob Haugaard – Wigan Athletic 2016–17
- **Mads Hermansen** – Leicester City, **West Ham United** 2023–24, 2026–
- **Daniel Iversen** – **Preston North End**, Stoke City 2020–22, 2023–24, 2025–
- Elias Jelert – Southampton 2025–26
- Brian Jensen – Burnley 2004–09, 2010–13
- **Lukas Jensen** – **Millwall** 2024–25, 2026–
- Mathias Jensen – Brentford 2019–21
- **Mathias Jørgensen** – **Blackburn Rovers** 2025–
- **Luca Kjerrumgaard** – **Watford** 2025–
- Jonas Knudsen – Ipswich Town 2015–19
- Victor Kristiansen – Leicester City 2025–26
- William Kvist – Wigan Athletic 2014–15
- **Mathias Kvistgaarden** – **Norwich City** 2025–
- **Mikkel Ladefoged** – **Lincoln City** 2026–
- Anders Lindegaard – Preston North End 2015–17
- Jonas Lössl – Huddersfield Town 2019–20
- Peter Løvenkrands – Newcastle United, Birmingham City 2009–10, 2012–14
- **Nicolas Madsen** – **Queens Park Rangers** 2024–
- Peter Madsen – Southampton F.C. 2005–06
- Simon Makienok – Charlton Athletic, Preston North End 2015–17
- Emiliano Marcondes – Brentford, Bournemouth, Norwich City 2017–22, 2024–26
- **Pelle Mattsson** – **Norwich City** 2025–
- **Henrik Meister** – **Derby County** 2026–
- Christian Nørgaard – Brentford 2019–21
- Marc Nygaard – Queens Park Rangers 2005–08
- Jeppe Okkels – Preston North End 2024–25
- William Osula – Sheffield United 2021–23
- Henrik Pedersen – Hull City 2006–07
- Kristian Pedersen – Birmingham City, Swansea City, Sheffield Wednesday 2018–22, 2023–24
- **August Priske** – **Birmingham City** 2025–
- Luka Racic – Brentford 2018–20
- Mileta Rajović – Watford 2023–25
- Marco Ramkilde – Queens Park Rangers 2019–20
- **Emil Riis Jakobsen** – Preston North End, **Bristol City** 2020–
- **Mads Roerslev** – Brentford, **Southampton** 2019–21, 2025–
- **Yousef Salech** – **Cardiff City** 2024–25, 2026–
- Kasper Schmeichel – Cardiff City, Coventry City, Leeds United, Leicester City 2007–08, 2010–14
- **Oscar Schwartau** – **Norwich City** 2024–
- Elias Sørensen – Portsmouth 2024–25
- Jakob Sørensen – Norwich City 2020–21, 2022–25
- Lasse Sørensen – Stoke City 2018–20
- Justin Shaibu – Brentford 2016–18
- Casper Sloth – Leeds United 2014–16
- Victor Torp – Coventry City 2023–26
- Jannik Vestergaard – Leicester City 2023–24, 2025–26
- Lasse Vibe – Brentford 2015–18
- Sammy Youssouf – Queens Park Rangers 2005–06
- Philip Zinckernagel – Watford, Nottingham Forest 2020–22
- Kenneth Zohore – Cardiff City, West Bromwich Albion, Millwall 2015–18, 2019–22

== Dominican Republic ==
- Juan Castillo – Birmingham City 2021–22
- Junior Firpo – Leeds United 2023–25

== Ecuador ==
- Ulises de la Cruz – Birmingham City 2008–09
- Aimar Govea – Swansea City 2023–24
- Jefferson Montero – Swansea City, West Bromwich Albion, Birmingham City 2018–20
- Juan Carlos Paredes – Watford 2014–15
- **Jeremy Sarmiento** – West Bromwich Albion, Ipswich Town, Burnley, **Middlesbrough** 2023–
- Joel Valencia – Brentford 2019–20
- Óscar Zambrano – Hull City 2024–25

== Egypt ==
- Adam El-Abd – Brighton & Hove Albion 2004–06, 2011–14
- Ahmed Elmohamady – Hull City, Aston Villa 2012–13, 2015–16, 2017–19
- Ahmed Fathy – Hull City 2012–13
- Gedo – Hull City 2012–13
- Ahmed Hegazi – West Bromwich Albion – 2018–20
- Mido – Barnsley 2012–13
- **Sam Morsy** – Wigan Athletic, Barnsley, Middlesbrough, Ipswich Town, Bristol City, **Blackburn Rovers** 2016–17, 2018–22, 2023–24, 2025–

== Equatorial Guinea ==
- Omar Mascarell – Derby County 2014–15
- Charles Ondo – Huddersfield Town 2022–23

== Estonia ==
- Karl Hein – Reading 2021–22
- Tarmo Kink – Middlesbrough 2010–12
- Mart Poom – Sunderland, Watford 2004–05, 2007–09
- **Rocco Robert Shein** – **Portsmouth** 2026–
- Andrei Stepanov – Watford 2008–09
- Sergei Zenjov – Blackpool 2014–15

== Faroe Islands ==
- Claus Bech Jørgensen – Coventry City, Blackpool 2004–09

== Fiji ==
- **Joshua Laqeretabua** – **Charlton Athletic** 2025–

== Finland ==
- Peter Enckelman – Cardiff City 2006–10
- Marcus Forss – Brentford, Hull City, Middlesbrough 2018–26
- Mikael Forssell – Birmingham City, Leeds United 2005–06, 2011–12
- Aapo Halme – Leeds United, Barnsley 2018–22
- Niko Hämäläinen – Queens Park Rangers 2016–17, 2020–21, 2022–
- Markus Heikkinen – Luton Town 2005–07
- Anssi Jaakkola – Reading 2017–19
- Jussi Jääskeläinen – Wigan Athletic 2016–17
- Jonatan Johansson – Norwich City 2005–06
- Jesse Joronen – Fulham 2014–15
- **Glen Kamara** – Leeds United, **Queens Park Rangers** 2023–24, 2026–
- Toni Kallio – Sheffield United 2009–10
- Joonas Kolkka – Crystal Palace 2005–06
- Peter Kopteff – Stoke City 2005–06
- Toni Koskela – Cardiff City 2004–05
- Shefki Kuqi – Swansea City, Crystal Palace 2009–11
- Thomas Lam – Nottingham Forest 2016–17
- Niki Mäenpää – Brighton & Hove Albion, Bristol City 2016–17, 2018–20
- Sakari Mattila – Fulham 2015–16
- Antti Niemi – Southampton 2005–06
- Jaakko Oksanen – Brentford 2018–20
- Teemu Pukki – Norwich City 2018–19, 2020–21, 2022–23
- Aki Riihilahti – Crystal Palace 2005–06
- Sampsa Timoska – Queens Park Rangers 2007–08
- Mika Väyrynen – Leeds United 2011–12
- **Leo Walta** – **Swansea City** 2025–

== France ==
- Jérémie Aliadière – Wolverhampton Wanderers, Middlesbrough 2005–06, 2009–10
- Jordan Amavi – Aston Villa 2016–17
- Tony Andreu – Norwich City, Rotherham United 2014–16
- Jean-Kévin Augustin – Leeds United 2019–20
- Loick Ayina – Huddersfield Town 2023–24
- El Hadji Ba – Charlton 2015–16
- **Moussa Baradji** – **Blackburn Rovers** 2025–
- Sekou Baradji – Reading 2005–06
- Yoann Barbet – Brentford, Queens Park Rangers 2015–22
- Guillaume Beuzelin – Coventry City 2008–09
- **Gady Beyuku** – **Blackburn Rovers** 2026–
- Maxime Biamou – Coventry City 2020–21
- **Florian Bianchini** – Swansea City, **Portsmouth** 2024–
- **Eric Bocat** – **Stoke City** 2024–
- Bertrand Bossu – Gillingham 2004–05
- Julien Brellier – Norwich City 2007–08
- Jean Calvé – Sheffield United 2010–11
- Etienne Camara – Huddersfield Town 2022–23
- Étienne Capoue – Watford 2020–21
- Florent Chaigneau – Brighton & Hove Albion 2005–06
- Pascal Chimbonda – Queens Park Rangers, Doncaster Rovers 2010–12
- **Lamine Cissé** – **Stoke City** 2025–
- Aly Cissokho – Aston Villa 2016–17
- Maxime Colin – Brentford, Birmingham City 2015–23
- Francis Coquelin – Charlton 2014–15
- **Grégoire Coudert** – **Burnley** 2026–
- Mohamed Coulibaly – Bournemouth 2013–14
- **Soumaïla Coulibaly** – **Watford** 2026–
- **Tristan Crama** – **Millwall** 2024–
- Julien Dacosta – Coventry City 2020–22
- Loïc Damour – Cardiff City 2017–18
- Éric Deloumeaux – Coventry City 2004–05
- Moussa Dembélé – Fulham 2014–16
- Dorian Dervite – Charlton, Bolton Wanderers 2012–16, 2017–18
- Sylvain Deslandes – Wolverhampton Wanders 2015–16, 2017–18
- Mohamed Diaby – Sheffield Wednesday 2023–24
- Toumani Diagouraga – Watford, Peterborough United, Brentford, Leeds United, Ipswich Town 2005–06, 2009–10, 2014–17
- Adama Diakhaby – Huddersfield Town, Nottingham Forest 2019–21
- Alou Diarra – Charlton 2014–16
- Claude Dielna – Sheffield Wednesday 2014–15
- Didier Digard – Middlesbrough 2009–10
- Loïs Diony – Bristol City 2017–18
- **Kyliane Dong** – **Bolton Wanderers** 2026–
- Pierre Ekwah – Sunderland, Watford 2022–24, 2025–26
- Mounir El Haimour – Barnsley 2008–10
- Maxime Estève – Burnley 2024–25
- Jean-Alain Fanchone – Watford 2012–13
- Rod Fanni – Charlton Athletic 2015–16
- Marc-Antoine Fortuné – Doncaster Rovers, Wigan Athletic 2011–12, 2013–15
- David Friio – Plymouth Argyle, Nottingham Forest 2004–05
- **Nolan Galves** – **West Bromwich Albion** 2026–
- Romain Gasmi – Southampton 2008–09
- Gaël Givet – Blackburn Rovers 2012–14
- Luigi Glombard – Cardiff City, Leicester City 2006–07
- Arthur Gnohéré – Queens Park Rangers 2004–05
- Claudio Gomes – Barnsley 2021–22
- Kévin Gomis – Nottingham Forest 2013–14
- Prince-Désir Gouano – Bolton Wanderers 2015–16
- Yoan Gouffran – Newcastle United 2016–17
- Hérold Goulon – Doncaster Rovers 2011–12
- Elliot Grandin – Blackpool 2011–13
- Léandre Griffit – Leeds United, Rotherham United, Crystal Palace 2004–05, 2008–09
- Josuha Guilavogui – Leeds United 2024–25
- Massadio Haïdara – Newcastle United 2016–17
- Jérémy Hélan – Sheffield Wednesday 2012–14
- Will Hondermarck – Barnsley 2021–22
- **Yanis Issoufou** – **Millwall** 2026–
- Jimmy Juan – Ipswich Town 2005–06
- **Mohamadou Kanté** – **West Ham United** 2026–
- Yann Kermorgant – Leicester City, Charlton Athletic, Bournemouth, Reading 2009–10, 2012–18
- Williams Kokolo – Middlesbrough 2021–22
- Ateef Konaté – Nottingham Forest 2021–22
- Anthony Knockaert – Leicester City, Brighton & Hove Albion, Fulham, Nottingham Forest, Huddersfield Town 2012–14, 2015–17, 2019–23
- Bengali-Fodé Koita – Blackburn Rovers 2015–16
- **Billy Koumetio** – **Charlton Athletic** 2026–
- Mathias Kouo-Doumbé – Plymouth Argyle 2004–09
- Ziyad Larkeche – Queens Park Rangers 2023–24
- Romain Larrieu – Plymouth Argyle 2004–10
- Florent Laville – Coventry City 2004–05
- Enzo Le Fée – Sunderland 2024–25
- Maxime Le Marchand – Fulham 2019–20
- Sylvain Legwinski – Ipswich Town 2006–08
- **Léo Leroy** – **Preston North End** 2026–
- Isaac Lihadji – Sunderland 2022–23
- Matthieu Louis-Jean – Norwich City 2005–06
- Yann M'Vila – West Bromwich Albion 2023–24
- **Adilson Malanda** – **Middlesbrough** 2025–
- Mikael Mandron – Wigan Athletic 2016–17
- Mathieu Manset – Reading 2010–12
- Sékou Mara – Southampton 2023–24
- Nicolas Marin – Plymouth Argyle 2008–09
- Malaury Martin – Middlesbrough 2011–13
- Han-Noah Massengo – Bristol City, Burnley 2019–23, 2024–25
- Neal Maupay – Brentford 2017–19
- Youl Mawéné – Preston North End 2004–10
- Fally Mayulu – Bristol City 2024–26
- **Derek Mazou-Sacko** – **Millwall** 2025–
- Loïc Mbe Soh – Nottingham Forest 2020–22
- Joseph Mendes – Reading 2016–18
- Illan Meslier – Leeds United 2019–20, 2023–25
- Édouard Michut – Sunderland 2022–23
- Yohan Mollo – Fulham 2017–18
- Lys Mousset – Sheffield United 2021–22
- Guy Moussi – Nottingham Forest, Millwall, Birmingham City 2008–15
- Yassin Moutaouakil – Charlton Athletic 2007–09
- Jean-Yves Mvoto – Barnsley 2013–14
- Lilian Nalis – Leicester City, Sheffield United, Coventry City, Plymouth Argyle 2004–08
- Paul Nardi – Queens Park Rangers 2024–26
- Alassane N'Diaye – Crystal Palace 2009–11
- David Ngog – Bolton Wanderers 2012–14
- Dany N'Guessan – Leicester City, Millwall 2009–13
- Guylain Ndumbu-Nsungu – Preston North End, Cardiff City 2004–06
- Christian Negouai – Coventry City 2004–05
- Bruno Ngotty – Birmingham City, Leicester City 2006–08
- Niels Nkounkou – Cardiff City 2022–23
- **Rabby Nzingoula** – **West Bromwich Albion** 2026–
- Steven Nzonzi – Stoke City 2025–26
- Gabriel Obertan – Wigan Athletic 2016–17
- Wilson Odobert – Burnley 2024–25
- Fabrice Pancrate – Newcastle United 2009–10
- Timothée Pembélé – Sunderland 2023–24
- **Brayann Pereira** – **West Bromwich Albion** 2026–
- Vincent Péricard – Sheffield United, Plymouth Argyle, Stoke City, Southampton 2005–08
- **Jeremy Petris** – **Watford** 2025–
- Frédéric Piquionne – West Ham United, Doncaster Rovers 2011–12
- Damien Plessis – Doncaster Rovers 2011–12
- Franck Queudrue – Birmingham City 2008–09
- **Ugo Raghouber** – **Burnley** 2026–
- Fabien Robert – Doncaster Rovers 2011–12
- Georginio Rutter – Leeds United 2023–25
- Brice Samba – Nottingham Forest 2019–22
- Yaya Sanogo – Charlton, Huddersfield Town 2015–16, 2020–21
- Amadou Sanokho – Burnley 2004–05
- Vincent Sasso – Sheffield Wednesday 2015–16
- Morgan Schneiderlin – Southampton 2008–09, 2011–12
- Saër Sène – Blackpool 2014–15
- Antoine Sibierski – Norwich City 2008–09
- Moussa Sissoko – Watford 2024–26
- Éric Skora – Preston North End 2004–05
- Youssef Sofiane – Coventry City 2005–06
- Boubakary Soumaré – Leicester City 2025–26
- Jean-Louis Valois – Burnley 2004–05
- Grégory Vignal – Southampton 2007–08
- Romain Vincelot – Brighton & Hove Albion 2011–13
- Rémy Vita – Barnsley 2021–22

== Gabon ==
- Frédéric Bulot – Charlton Athletic 2014–15
- Bruno Ecuele Manga – Cardiff City 2014–18
- **Jacques Ekomié** – **Wrexham** 2026–
- Didier Ndong – Sunderland 2017–18

== Gambia (The Gambia) ==
- **Ebou Adams** – Cardiff City, Derby County, **Portsmouth** 2023–
- Modou Barrow – Nottingham Forest, Blackburn Rovers, Leeds United, Reading 2014–20
- Mustapha Carayol – Middlesbrough, Brighton & Hove Albion, Huddersfield Town, Leeds United, Nottingham Forest, Ipswich Town 2012–18
- Modou Faal – West Bromwich Albion 2022–23
- Saidy Janko – Bolton Wanderers, Barnsley, Nottingham Forest 2014–15, 2016–17, 2018–19
- Saikou Janneh – Bristol City 2020–22
- Omar Koroma – Norwich City 2008–09
- Cherno Samba – Plymouth Argyle 2006–07
- Seyfo Soley – Preston North End 2006–07

== Georgia (Georgia (country)) ==
- **Giorgi Chakvetadze** – **Watford** 2023–
- **Saba Goglichidze** – **Watford** 2025–
- Zurab Khizanishvili – Newcastle United, Reading 2009–11

== Germany ==
- Jordan Amissah – Sheffield United 2022–23
- **Kwadwo Baah** – **Watford** 2024–
- Mike-Steven Bähre – Barnsley 2019–20
- Patrick Bauer – Charlton, Preston North End 2015–16, 2019–25
- Steven Benda – Swansea City, Peterborough United, Millwall 2020–23, 2025–26
- Jordan Beyer – Burnley 2022–23
- **Filip Bilbija** – **Derby County** 2026–
- Eugen Bopp – Nottingham Forest 2004–05
- Julian Börner – Sheffield Wednesday 2019–21
- Leon Dajaku – Sunderland 2022–23
- **Marvin Ducksch** – **Birmingham City** 2025–
- Max Ehmer – Queens Park Rangers 2013–14
- Thomas Eisfeld – Fulham 2014–15
- Marcel Franke – Norwich City 2017–18
- Fabian Giefer – Bristol City 2016–17
- Robert Glatzel – Cardiff City 2019–21
- Akaki Gogia – Brentford 2015–16
- Maximilian Haas – Middlesbrough 2010–11
- Michael Hefele – Huddersfield Town, Nottingham Forest 2016–17, 2018–19
- Jens Hegeler – Bristol City 2016–18
- Rouwen Hennings – Burnley 2015–16
- Philipp Hofmann – Brentford 2015–17
- Lewis Holtby – Blackburn Rovers 2019–21
- Tim Hoogland – Fulham 2014–15
- Uwe Hünemeier – Brighton & Hove Albion 2015–17
- Robert Huth – Middlesbrough 2009–10
- **Caspar Jander** – **Southampton** 2025–
- Vitaly Janelt – Brentford 2020–21
- Reda Khadra – Blackburn Rovers, Sheffield United, Birmingham City 2021–23
- Jan Kirchhoff – Bolton Wanderers 2017–18
- Tom Krauß – Luton Town 2024–25
- Pierre-Michel Lasogga – Leeds United 2017–18
- Toni Leistner – Queens Park Rangers 2018–20
- Moritz Leitner – Norwich City 2017–19
- Chris Löwe – Huddersfield Town 2016–17
- Kilian Ludewig – Barnsley 2019–21
- Marvin Mehlem – Hull City 2024–25
- Heinz Müller – Barnsley 2007–09
- **Phil Neumann** – **Birmingham City** 2025–
- Lukas Nmecha – Preston North End, Middlesbrough 2018–20
- Felix Passlack – Norwich City 2018–19
- Sebastian Polter – Queens Park Rangers 2015–17
- Nick Proschwitz – Hull City, Barnsley, Brentford 2012–15
- Collin Quaner – Huddersfield Town, Ipswich Town 2016–17, 2018–20
- **Joshua Quarshie** – **Southampton** 2025–
- Marco Reich – Derby County, Crystal Palace 2004–07
- Lukas Rupp – Norwich City 2020–21
- Dennis Srbeny – Norwich City 2017–19
- Christopher Schindler – Huddersfield Town 2016–17, 2019–21
- **Keven Schlotterbeck** – **Southampton** 2026–
- Marco Stiepermann – Norwich City 2017–19, 2020–21
- Semir Telalović – Blackburn Rovers 2023–24
- Robert Tesche – Nottingham Forest, Birmingham City 2014–17
- **Omar Haktab Traoré** – **Watford** 2026–
- Tom Trybull – Norwich City, Blackburn Rovers, Blackpool 2017–19, 2020–21, 2022–23
- Andreas Voglsammer – Millwall 2022–23
- Moritz Volz – Ipswich Town 2008–09
- Kai Wagner – Birmingham City 2025–26
- **Max Weiß** – **Burnley** 2026–
- Dominik Werling – Barnsley 2007–08
- Felix Wiedwald – Leeds United 2017–18
- Christoph Zimmermann – Norwich City 2017–19, 2020–21

== Ghana ==
- Salis Abdul Samed – Sunderland 2024–25
- Kelvin Abrefa – Reading 2021–23
- Albert Adomah – Bristol City, Middlesbrough, Aston Villa, Nottingham Forest, Cardiff City, Queens Park Rangers 2010–24
- **Forson Amankwah** – **Norwich City** 2024–
- Kwesi Appiah – Crystal Palace, Reading 2011–13, 2014–15
- Koby Arthur – Birmingham City 2012–15
- Christian Atsu – Newcastle United 2016–17
- André Ayew – Swansea City 2019–21
- **Jordan Ayew** – Aston Villa, Leicester City, **Sheffield United** 2016–17, 2025–
- Michael Baidoo – Plymouth Argyle 2024–25
- Prince Buaben – Watford 2011–13
- Chris Dickson – Charlton Athletic 2007–09
- Caleb Ekuban – Leeds United 2017–18
- Abdul Fatawu – Leicester City 2023–24, 2025–26
- Tariqe Fosu – Reading, Brentford, Stoke City, Rotherham United 2014–15, 2019–21, 2022–23
- Emmanuel Frimpong – Charlton Athletic, Barnsley 2012–14
- **Mohammed Fuseini** – **Derby County** 2026–
- Elvis Hammond – Leicester City 2005–07
- **Tariq Lamptey** – **Queens Park Rangers** 2026–
- Eddie Nketiah – Leeds United 2019–20
- Denis Odoi – Fulham 2016–18, 2019–20, 2021–22
- **Joseph Opoku** – **Swansea City** 2026–
- Ibrahim Osman – Birmingham City 2025–26
- Lloyd Owusu – Reading 2004–05
- Quincy Owusu-Abeyie – Birmingham City, Cardiff City 2008–09
- John Paintsil – Leicester City 2011–12
- **Kwame Poku** – Peterborough United, **Queens Park Rangers** 2021–22, 2025–
- Baba Rahman – Reading 2021–23
- Lloyd Sam – Sheffield Wednesday, Southend United, Charlton Athletic, Leeds United 2006–09, 2010–12
- Jeffrey Schlupp – Leicester City, Norwich City 2011–14, 2025–26
- Antoine Semenyo – Bristol City 2017–23
- Kamaldeen Sulemana – Southampton 2023–24
- Benjamin Tetteh – Hull City 2022–23
- Brandon Thomas-Asante – West Bromwich Albion, Coventry City 2022–26
- Andy Yiadom – Barnsley, Reading 2016–23

== Gibraltar ==
- Danny Higginbotham – Southampton, Stoke City, Nottingham Forest, Ipswich Town 2005–08, 2011–13
- Carlos Richards – Derby County 2021–22
- Scott Wiseman – Hull City, Barnsley 2005–06, 2011–14

== Greece ==
- George Baldock – MK Dons, Sheffield United 2015–16, 2017–19, 2021–23
- Andreas Bouchalakis – Nottingham Forest 2017–18
- Nikos Dabizas – Leicester City 2004–05
- Dimitris Giannoulis – Norwich City 2020–21, 2022–24
- Dimitrios Goutas – Cardiff City 2023–25
- Stefanos Kapino – Nottingham Forest 2017–18
- Nikos Karelis – Brentford 2019–20
- Dimitrios Konstantopoulos – Coventry City, Cardiff City, Swansea City, Middlesbrough 2007–10, 2013–16
- **Konstantinos Mavropanos** – **West Ham United** 2026–
- Dimitrios Pelkas – Hull City 2022–23
- Manolis Siopis – Cardiff City 2023–25
- Kostas Stafylidis – Fulham 2014–15
- Nectarios Triantis – Sunderland 2023–25
- Christos Tzolis – Norwich City 2022–23
- Apostolos Vellios – Blackpool, Nottingham Forest 2013–14, 2016–18

== Grenada ==
- Shandon Baptiste – Brentford, Luton Town 2019–21, 2024–25
- Regan Charles-Cook – Charlton Athletic 2015–16
- Antonio German – Queens Park Rangers 2008–11
- Leon Johnson – Gillingham 2004–05
- Oliver Norburn – Peterborough United 2021–22
- Jason Roberts – Wigan Athletic, Reading 2004–05, 2011–12
- Craig Rocastle – Sheffield Wednesday 2005–06

== Guadeloupe ==
- **Taïryk Arconte** – **Millwall** 2026–
- Dimitri Kevin Cavaré – Barnsley 2017–20
- Pascal Chimbonda – Queens Park Rangers, Doncaster Rovers 2010–12
- Miguel Comminges – Cardiff City 2008–10
- Joël Dielna – Blackpool 2014–15
- Therry Racon – Charlton Athletic, Millwall 2007–09, 2011–13
- Ludovic Sylvestre – Blackpool 2011–13
- Yohann Thuram-Ulien – Charlton Athletic 2013–14
- Ronald Zubar – Wolverhampton Wanderers 2012–13

== Guatemala ==
- Nathaniel Mendez-Laing – Peterborough United, Cardiff City, Middlesbrough, Derby County 2012–13, 2017–18, 2019–21, 2024–25

== Guinea-Bissau ==
- Mamadi Camará – Reading 2020–23
- Marcelo Djaló – Fulham 2017–18
- Carlos Mendes Gomes – Luton Town 2021–22
- Arnaud Mendy – Derby County 2009–10
- Formose Mendy – Blackpool 2014–15
- Pelé – Nottingham Forest, Reading 2018–20
- Alfa Semedo – Nottingham Forest, Reading 2019–21
- Toni Silva – Barnsley 2012–13
- Ronaldo Vieira – Leeds United 2015–18

== Guinea ==
- Sambégou Bangoura – Stoke City 2005–07
- Abdoul Camara – Derby County 2015–17
- Mohammed Camara – Norwich City, Blackpool, Derby County 2007–09
- Ibrahima Cissé – Fulham 2017–18
- Drissa Diallo – Ipswich Town, Sheffield Wednesday 2004–06
- Julian Jeanvier – Brentford 2018–20
- Sory Kaba – Cardiff City 2022–23
- Abdoulaye Kamara – Portsmouth 2024–25
- Bengali-Fodé Koita – Blackburn Rovers 2015–16
- Idrissa Sylla – Queens Park Rangers 2016–19
- Larsen Touré – Ipswich Town 2015–16
- Kamil Zayatte – Hull City, Sheffield Wednesday 2010–11, 2013–15

== Guyana ==
- Matthew Briggs – Peterborough United, Bristol City, Watford, Millwall 2011–13, 2014–15
- Carl Cort – Wolverhampton Wanderers, Leicester City, Norwich City 2004–09
- Leon Cort – Hull City, Crystal Palace, Stoke City, Burnley, Preston North End, Charlton Athletic 2005–08, 2010–11, 2012–14
- Neil Danns – Birmingham City, Crystal Palace, Leicester City, Bristol City, Huddersfield Town, Bolton Wanderers 2006–16
- Stephen Duke-McKenna – Queens Park Rangers 2020–21, 2023–24
- Callum Harriott – Charlton Athletic, Reading 2012–19
- Isaiah Jones – Middlesbrough, Luton Town 2021–25

== Haiti ==
- **Jean-Ricner Bellegarde** – **Wolverhampton Wanderers** 2026–
- Hannes Delcroix – Swansea City 2024–25
- Wilson Isidor – Sunderland 2024–25

== Honduras ==
- Carlo Costly – Birmingham City 2008–09
- Roger Espinoza – Wigan Athletic 2013–15
- Maynor Figueroa – Wigan Athletic 2014–15
- Ramón Núñez – Leeds United, Scunthorpe United 2010–12

== Hungary ==
- Bálint Bajner – Ipswich Town 2014–15
- Béla Balogh – Colchester United 2007–08
- Norbert Balogh – Hull City 2019–20
- Ádám Bogdán – Bolton Wanderers, Wigan Athletic 2012–15, 2016–17
- Gábor Bori – Leicester City 2007–08
- Ákos Buzsáky – Plymouth Argyle, Queens Park Rangers, Barnsley 2004–12
- István Ferenczi – Barnsley 2006–08
- Márton Fülöp – Coventry City, Sunderland, Leicester City, Ipswich Town 2005–07, 2010–11
- Márkó Futács – Portsmouth, Leicester City, Blackpool 2011–13
- Zoltán Gera – West Bromwich Albion 2006–08
- Péter Gulácsi – Hull City 2011–12
- Gábor Gyepes – Wolverhampton Wanderers, Cardiff City 2005–07, 2008–12
- Péter Halmosi – Plymouth Argyle 2006–08
- Tamás Kádár – Newcastle United 2009–10
- Gábor Király – Crystal Palace, Burnley, Fulham 2005–08, 2014–15
- **Márk Kosznovszky** – **Portsmouth** 2025–
- Péter Kurucz – West Ham United 2011–12
- Zsolt Laczkó – Leicester City 2007–08
- Zoltán Lipták – Southampton 2008–09
- Ádám Nagy – Bristol City 2019–21
- Loïc Négo – Charlton Athletic 2013–14
- Tamás Priskin – Watford, Preston North End, Ipswich Town, Queens Park Rangers, Swansea City, Derby County 2007–12
- Péter Rajczi – Barnsley 2006–07
- Dénes Rósa – Wolverhampton Wanderers 2005–09
- **Callum Styles** – Barnsley, Millwall, Sunderland, **West Bromwich Albion** 2019–
- Kornél Szűcs – Plymouth Argyle 2024–25
- Krisztián Timár – Plymouth Argyle 2006–10
- **Balázs Tóth** – **Blackburn Rovers** 2024–
- Dániel Tőzsér – Watford, Queens Park Rangers 2013–16
- József Varga – Middlesbrough 2013–14
- Tamás Vaskó – Bristol City 2007–08

== Iceland ==
- Kári Árnason – Plymouth Argyle, Rotherham United 2009–10, 2014–15
- Jóhann Berg Guðmundsson – Charlton Athletic, Burnley 2014–16, 2022–23, 2024–25
- Birkir Bjarnason – Aston Villa 2016–19
- Jón Daði Böðvarsson – Wolverhampton Wanderers, Reading, Millwall 2016–21
- Gylfi Einarsson – Leeds United 2004–07
- Daníel Leó Grétarsson – Blackpool 2021–22
- Bjarni Guðjónsson – Coventry City, Plymouth Argyle 2004–06
- Joey Guðjónsson – Leicester City, Burnley 2004–09
- **Andri Guðjohnsen** – **Blackburn Rovers** 2025–
- Eiður Guðjohnsen – Bolton Wanderers 2014–15
- Þórður Guðjónsson – Stoke City 2004–06
- Aron Gunnarsson – Coventry City, Cardiff City 2008–13, 2014–18
- Brynjar Gunnarsson – Reading 2005–06, 2008–12
- Patrik Gunnarsson – Brentford 2018–19
- Emil Hallfreðsson – Barnsley 2009–10
- Heiðar Helguson – Watford, Queens Park Rangers, Cardiff City 2004–05, 2008–11, 2012–13
- Hermann Hreiðarsson – Portsmouth, Coventry city 2010–12
- Ívar Ingimarsson – Reading, Ipswich Town 2004–06, 2008–12
- Eggert Jónsson – Wolverhampton Wanderers, Charlton Athletic 2012–13
- Hörður Björgvin Magnússon – Bristol City 2016–18
- Victor Pálsson – Plymouth Argyle 2024–25
- Rúnar Alex Rúnarsson – Cardiff City 2023–24
- Alfons Sampsted – Birmingham City 2025–26
- Björn Sigurðarson – Wolverhampton Wanderers 2012–13, 2015–16
- Arnór Sigurðsson – Blackburn Rovers 2023–25
- Gylfi Sigurðsson – Reading 2008–11
- Hannes Sigurðsson – Stoke City 2005–07
- Ragnar Sigurðsson – Fulham 2016–17
- Stefán Teitur Þórðarson – Preston North End 2024–26
- Gunnar Heiðar Þorvaldsson – Reading 2009–10
- **Willum Þór Willumsson** – **Birmingham City** 2025–

== India ==
- Ryan Williams – Portsmouth, Fulham, Barnsley, Rotherham United 2011–12, 2014–15, 2016–17, 2018–19

== Indonesia ==
- **Elkan Baggott** – **Millwall** 2026–
- Marselino Ferdinan – Oxford United 2024–25
- Joey Pelupessy – Sheffield Wednesday 2017–21
- Ole Romeny – Oxford United 2024–26
- Nathan Tjoe-A-On – Swansea City 2024–25

== Iran ==
- Karim Ansarifard – Nottingham Forest 2018–19
- Ashkan Dejagah – Nottingham Forest 2017–18
- Saeid Ezatolahi – Reading 2018–19
- Saman Ghoddos – Brentford 2020–21
- Reza Ghoochannejhad – Charlton Athletic 2013–14, 2015–16
- Hossein Kaebi – Leicester City 2007–08
- Alex Samizadeh – Bolton 2015–16
- Allahyar Sayyadmanesh – Hull City 2021–24
- Andranik Teymourian – Barnsley 2008–09

== Iraq ==
- Ali Al-Hamadi – Ipswich Town, Stoke City 2023–26
- Yaser Kasim – Brighton & Hove Albion 2011–13

== Israel ==
- Gai Assulin – Brighton & Hove Albion 2011–12
- Tal Ben Haim – Portsmouth, Charlton Athletic 2010–12, 2014–15
- Yossi Benayoun – Queens Park Rangers 2013–14
- Tomer Hemed – Brighton & Hove Albion, Queens Park Rangers, Charlton Athletic 2015–17, 2018–20
- Beram Kayal – Brighton & Hove Albion, Charlton Athletic 2014–17, 2019–20
- Dekel Keinan – Cardiff City, Crystal Palace, Bristol City 2010–12
- **Daniel Peretz** – **Southampton** 2025–
- Ben Sahar – Queens Park Rangers, Sheffield Wednesday 2007–08
- **Manor Solomon** – Leeds United, **West Ham United** 2024–25, 2026–
- Miguel Vítor – Leicester City 2010–11

== Italy ==
- Matteo Alberti – Queens Park Rangers 2008–10
- Gabriele Angella – Watford, Queens Park Rangers 2013–16
- Mirco Antenucci – Leeds United 2014–16
- Cristian Battocchio – Watford 2012–14
- Giuseppe Bellusci – Leeds United 2014–16
- Tommaso Bianchi – Leeds United 2014–16
- Fabio Borini – Swansea City 2010–11
- **Edoardo Bove** – **Watford** 2025–
- Cesare Casadei – Reading, Leicester City 2022–24
- Marco Cassetti – Watford 2012–14
- Samuel Di Carmine – Queens Park Rangers 2008–09
- Nicolao Dumitru – Nottingham Forest 2016–17
- Diego Fabbrini – Watford, Millwall, Birmingham City, Middlesbrough 2013–17
- Davide Faraoni – Watford 2013–14
- Andrea Ferretti – Cardiff City 2005–06
- Fernando Forestieri – Watford, Sheffield Wednesday 2012–20
- Gianluca Frabotta – West Bromwich Albion 2024–25
- Emanuele Gabrieli – Sheffield United 2004–05
- **Laurence Giani** – **Stoke City** 2026–
- Wilfried Gnonto – Leeds United 2023–25
- Pierluigi Gollini – Aston Villa 2016–17
- Luca Koleosho – Burnley 2024–25
- Matteo Lanzoni – Yeovil Town 2013–14
- Arturo Lupoli – Derby County, Norwich City, Sheffield United 2006–07, 2008–09
- Federico Macheda – Doncaster Rovers, Birmingham City, Cardiff City, Nottingham Forest 2013–16
- Vito Mannone – Barnsley, Hull City, Reading 2006–07, 2010–12, 2017–19
- Mauro Milanese – Queens Park Rangers 2005–07
- Marco Motta – Watford, Charlton 2014–16
- Gianni Munari – Watford 2014–15
- Angelo Ogbonna – Watford 2024–25
- Caleb Okoli – Leicester City 2025–26
- João Pedro – Hull City 2024–25
- Alessandro Pellicori – Queens Park Rangers 2009–10
- Davide Petrucci – Peterborough United, Charlton Athletic 2012–14
- Eros Pisano – Bristol City 2017–19
- Francesco Pisano – Bolton Wanderers 2015–16
- **Federico Ravaglia** – **Watford** 2026–
- Generoso Rossi – Queens Park Rangers 2004–05
- Luca Scapuzzi – Portsmouth 2011–12
- Marco Silvestri – Leeds United 2014–17
- Damiano Tommasi – Queens Park Rangers 2008–09
- Marcello Trotta – Watford 2011–12
- Ephraim Yeboah – Bristol City 2023–24

== Jamaica ==
- Rolando Aarons – Newcastle United, Sheffield Wednesday, Huddersfield Town 2016–17, 2018–19, 2020–22
- **Karoy Anderson** – **Charlton Athletic** 2025–
- Michail Antonio – Reading, Sheffield Wednesday, Nottingham Forest 2009–16
- Rodolph Austin – Leeds United 2012–15
- Giles Barnes – Derby County, West Bromwich Albion, Doncaster Rovers 2005–07, 2008–10, 2011–12
- Marcus Bean – Queens Park Rangers 2004–06
- Jermaine Beckford – Leeds United, Leicester City, Huddersfield Town, Bolton Wanderers, Preston North End 2005–07, 2011–17
- **Amari'i Bell** – Birmingham City, Blackburn Rovers, Luton Town, **Charlton Athletic** 2013–14, 2018–23, 2024–
- Trevor Benjamin – Leicester City, Coventry City, Watford 2004–06
- Elliott Bennett – Norwich City, Brighton & Hove Albion, Bristol City, Blackburn Rovers 2014–17, 2018–21
- Di'Shon Bernard – Hull City, Sheffield Wednesday 2020–21, 2023–25
- **Andre Brooks** – Sheffield United, **Norwich City** 2022–23, 2024–
- **Dajaune Brown** – **Derby County** 2024–
- **Rumarn Burrell** – **Queens Park Rangers** 2025–
- Deon Burton – Sheffield Wednesday, Charlton Athletic 2005–09
- Darren Byfield – Gillingham, Bristol City, Doncaster Rovers 2004–05, 2007–09
- **Bailey Cadamarteri** – Sheffield Wednesday, **Wrexham** 2023–24, 2025–
- **Tyreece Campbell** – **Charlton Athletic** 2025–
- Jamal Campbell-Ryce – Rotherham United, Southend United, Barnsley, Bristol City 2004–05, 2006–07, 2007–12
- Jordan Cousins – Charlton Athletic, Queens Park Rangers, Stoke City, Wigan Athletic 2013–21, 2022–23
- Shaun Cummings – West Bromwich Albion, Reading, Millwall F.C. 2009–12, 2013–15
- Omar Daley – Preston North End 2004–05
- Claude Davis – Preston North End, Derby County, Crystal Palace 2004–06, 2008–11
- Simon Dawkins – Derby County 2013–15
- Bobby De Cordova-Reid – Bristol City, Brentford, Cardiff City, Fulham, Leicester City 2010–11, 2012–13, 2015–18, 2019–20, 2021–22, 2025–26
- Clayton Donaldson – Birmingham City, Sheffield United, Bolton Wanderers 2014–19
- Lloyd Doyley – Watford, Rotherham United 2004–06, 2007–16
- Chey Dunkley – Wigan Athletic, Sheffield Wednesday 2018–21
- Marvin Elliott – Millwall, Bristol City 2004–06, 2007–13
- Jason Euell – Southampton, Blackpool, Doncaster Rovers 2007–11
- Damien Francis – Watford 2007–09
- Francino Francis – Watford 2005–06
- Ricardo Fuller – Preston North End, Southampton, Ipswich Town, Stoke City, Charlton Athletic, Blackpool, Millwall 2004–08, 2012–15
- Ricardo Gardner – Preston North End 2010–11
- Marcus Gayle – Watford 2004–05
- Lewis Grabban – Crystal Palace, Millwall, Bournemouth, Norwich City, Reading, Sunderland, Aston Villa, Nottingham Forest 2006–08, 2010–11, 2013–15, 2016–22
- Joel Grant – Watford, Yeovil Town 2005–06, 2013–14
- Andre Gray – Brentford, Burnley, Watford, Queens Park Rangers, Plymouth Argyle 2014–16, 2020–22, 2024–25
- **Demarai Gray** – **Birmingham City** 2013–16, 2025–
- Wes Harding – Birmingham City, Rotherham United, Millwall 2017–21, 2022–26
- Isaac Hayden – Hull City, Newcastle United, Norwich City, Queens Park Rangers, Portsmouth 2015–17, 2022–26
- Barry Hayles – Sheffield United, Millwall, Plymouth Argyle, Leicester City 2004–08
- Michael Hector – Reading, Hull City, Sheffield Wednesday, Fulham 2013–16, 2017–20, 2021–22
- Rico Henry – Brentford 2016–21
- Mason Holgate – West Bromwich Albion, Southampton – 2018–19, 2023–25
- Chris Humphrey – Preston North End 2015–17
- Omari Hutchinson – Ipswich Town 2023–24
- Micah Hyde – Burnley – 2004–07
- Daniel Johnson – Preston North End, Stoke City 2015–25
- David Johnson – Nottingham Forest, Sheffield United 2004–06
- Jermaine Johnson – Sheffield Wednesday 2007–10, 2012–14
- Michael Johnson – Derby County, Sheffield Wednesday 2004–08
- Marlon King – Nottingham Forest, Leeds United, Watford, Coventry City, Birmingham City 2004–06, 2007–08, 2010–13
- Richard Langley – Cardiff City F.C., Queens Park Rangers, Luton Town F.C. 2004–07
- Joel Latibeaudiere – Swansea City, Coventry City 2020–26
- Greg Leigh – Ipswich Town, Oxford United 2023–26
- Dexter Lembikisa – Rotherham United 2023–24
- Kevin Lisbie – Norwich City, Derby County, Colchester United, Ipswich Town, Millwall 2005–06, 2007–09, 2010–11
- Jamal Lowe – Wigan Athletic, Swansea City, Bournemouth, Queens Park Rangers, Sheffield Wednesday 2019–26
- Jamar Loza – Norwich City 2014–15
- Adrian Mariappa – Watford, Reading, Bristol City 2005–06, 2007–12, 2020–21
- Ephron Mason-Clark – Coventry City – 2024–26
- Tyrone Mears – Preston North End, Derby County, Burnley F.C., Bolton Wanderers, 2004–06, 2007, 2008–09, 2010–11, 2012–14
- Jobi McAnuff – West Ham United, Cardiff City, Crystal Palace, Watford, Reading 2004–12, 2013–14
- Garath McCleary – Nottingham Forest, Reading, Wycombe Wanderers 2008–12, 2013–21
- Darren Moore – Derby County, Barnsley 2005–07, 2008–10
- Liam Moore – Leicester City, Brentford, Bristol City, Reading, Stoke City 2011–23
- Wes Morgan – Nottingham Forest, Leicester City 2003–05, 2008–14
- Ravel Morrison – West Ham United, Birmingham City, Queens Park Rangers, Cardiff City, Middlesbrough, Derby County 2011–15, 2016–17, 2019–20, 2021–22
- Nyron Nosworthy – Gillingham F.C., Sunderland, Sheffield United, Watford, Blackpool – 2004–05, 2006–07, 2009–15
- Kasey Palmer – Huddersfield Town, Derby County, Blackburn Rovers, Bristol City, Swansea City, Coventry City, Hull City 2016–26
- Demar Phillips – Stoke City 2007–08
- Ethan Pinnock – Bristol City, Brentford 2017–18, 2019–21
- Darryl Powell – Nottingham Forest 2004–05
- Dane Richards – Burnley 2012–13
- Dujuan Richards – Leicester City 2025–26
- Theo Robinson – Watford, Millwall, Derby County, Huddersfield Town, Doncaster Rovers 2005–06, 2008–09, 2010–14
- Trevor Robinson – Millwall 2004–06
- Kemar Roofe – Leeds United, Derby County 2016–19, 2024–25
- Jon Russell – Huddersfield Town 2021–23
- Ricky Sappleton – Leicester City 2007–08
- Luton Shelton – Sheffield United 2007–08
- Frank Sinclair – Burnley – 2004–07
- Damion Stewart – Queens Park Rangers, Bristol City 2006–12
- Kevin Stewart – Hull City, Blackpool 2017–20, 2021–23
- Cleveland Taylor – Scunthorpe United 2007–08
- O'Neil Thompson – Barnsley 2009–10
- Curtis Tilt – Wigan Athletic 2022–23
- Lee Williamson – Watford, Preston North End, Sheffield United, Blackburn Rovers, Burton Albion 2007–11, 2012–17

== Japan ==
- Yuki Abe – Leicester City 2009–12
- **Kanya Fujimoto** – **Birmingham City** 2025–
- Kyōgo Furuhashi – Birmingham City 2025–26
- Daiki Hashioka – Luton Town 2024–25
- **Reo Hatate** – **Burnley** 2026–
- Ryō Hatsuse – Sheffield Wednesday 2024–25
- **Yū Hirakawa** – **Bristol City**, Hull City 2024–
- Junichi Inamoto – Cardiff City, West Bromwich Albion 2004–05, 2006–07
- **Atsuki Itō** – **Bolton Wanderers** 2026–
- **Tomoki Iwata** – **Birmingham City** 2025–
- Tadanari Lee – Southampton 2011–12
- **Kuryu Matsuki** – **Southampton** 2025–
- Kōji Miyoshi – Birmingham City 2023–24
- **Ryōya Morishita** – **Blackburn Rovers** 2025–
- Yūta Nakayama – Huddersfield Town 2022–24
- **Yuki Ohashi** – **Blackburn Rovers** 2024–
- **Koki Saito** – **Queens Park Rangers** 2024–
- Tatsuhiro Sakamoto – Coventry City 2023–26
- **Tatsuki Seko** – **Stoke City** 2024–
- Yukinari Sugawara – Southampton 2025–26
- Ao Tanaka – Leeds United 2024–25

== Jordan ==
- **Tammer Bany** – **West Bromwich Albion** 2024–

== Kazakhstan ==
- Alexander Merkel – Watford 2013–14
- **Dastan Satpaev** – **Burnley** 2026–

== Kenya ==
- **Sydney Agina** – **Stoke City** 2025–
- Ayub Masika – Reading 2019–20
- Clarke Oduor – Barnsley 2019–22
- **Timothy Ouma** – **Charlton Athletic** 2026–
- **Collins Sichenje** – **Charlton Athletic** 2025–
- **Zak Vyner** – Bristol City, Rotherham United, **Wrexham** 2015–

== Kosovo ==
- Bersant Celina – Ipswich Town, Swansea City, Stoke City 2017–20, 2022–23
- Florent Hadergjonaj – Huddersfield Town 2019–20
- Arijanet Muric – Nottingham Forest, Burnley 2019–20, 2022–23
- Atdhe Nuhiu – Sheffield Wednesday 2013–20
- Milot Rashica – Norwich City – 2022–23

== Latvia ==
- Aleksandrs Cauņa – Watford 2008–09
- **Dennis Cirkin** – Sunderland, **Queens Park Rangers** 2022–25, 2026–
- Kaspars Gorkšs – Blackpool, Queens Park Rangers, Reading, Wolverhampton Wanderers 2007–14
- Vitālijs Maksimenko – Brighton & Hove Albion 2013–14
- Marians Pahars – Southampton 2005–06
- Andrejs Perepļotkins – Derby County 2008–09
- Deniss Rakels – Reading 2015–17

== Liberia ==
- Alex Nimely – Middlesbrough, Coventry City, Crystal Palace 2011–13

== Lithuania ==
- Deimantas Petravičius – Nottingham Forest 2015–16
- Andrius Velička – Bristol City 2009–10
- Marius Žaliūkas – Leeds United 2013–14

== Luxembourg ==
- Danel Sinani – Huddersfield Town, Norwich City, Wigan Athletic 2021–23

== Mali ==
- Mamadou Bagayoko – Doncaster Rovers 2011–12
- Kalifa Cissé – Reading, Bristol City, Derby County 2008–12, 2013–14
- Ismaila Coulibaly – Sheffield United 2022–23
- **Ousmane Diakité** – **West Bromwich Albion** 2024–
- Samba Diakité – Watford 2013–14
- Brahima Diarra – Huddersfield Town 2020–21, 2022–24
- Nouha Dicko – Blackpool, Wolverhampton Wanderers, Hull City 2011–13, 2014–20
- **Mamadou Doumbia** – **Watford** 2024–
- Tongo Doumbia – Wolverhampton Wanderers 2012–13
- Jimmy Kébé – Reading, Leeds United 2008–12, 2013–14
- Cheick Keita – Birmingham City 2016–18
- Modibo Maïga – Queens Park Rangers 2013–14
- Hadi Sacko – Leeds United 2016–18
- Bakary Sako – Wolverhampton Wanderers, West Bromwich 2012–13, 2014–15, 2018–19
- Mamady Sidibé – Gillingham, Stoke City, Sheffield Wednesday 2004–08, 2012–13
- Samba Sow – Nottingham Forest 2019–21
- Adama Traoré – Hull City 2022–24
- **Boubacar Traoré** – **Wolverhampton Wanderers** 2026–
- Djimi Traoré – Birmingham City 2008–09
- Molla Wagué – Nottingham Forest 2018–19
- **Moussa Yeo** – **Swansea City** 2026–

== Malta ==
- Daniel Bogdanović – Barnsley, Sheffield United 2008–11
- Jodi Jones – Coventry City 2021–22
- Michael Mifsud – Coventry City, Barnsley 2007–09
- Joe Muscatt – Bolton Wanderers 2018–19

== Martinique ==
- Sébastien Carole – Brighton and Hove Albion, Leeds United 2005–07
- Julien Faubert – West Ham United 2011–12
- Wesley Jobello – Coventry City – 2020–21
- Frédéric Piquionne – West Ham United, Doncaster Rovers 2011–12
- **Jonathan Varane** – **Queens Park Rangers** 2024–

== Mauritania ==
- Abdoullah Ba – Sunderland 2022–24
- Souleymane Doukara – Leeds United 2014–17
- Djeidi Gassama – Sheffield Wednesday 2023–25
- Aboubakar Kamara – Fulham – 2017–18, 2019–20, 2021–22

== Mauritius ==
- Kévin Bru – Ipswich Town 2014–18

== Mexico ==
- **Edson Álvarez** – **West Ham United** 2026–
- Pablo Barrera – West Ham United 2011–12
- Giovani dos Santos – Ipswich Town 2008–09
- **Raúl Jiménez** – **Wolverhampton Wanderers** 2026–
- Miguel Layún – Watford 2014–15

== Montenegro ==
- Sead Hakšabanović – Stoke City 2023–24
- **Milutin Osmajić** – **Preston North End** 2023–
- Matija Šarkić – Birmingham City, Stoke City, Millwall 2021–24
- **Andrija Vukčević** – **Preston North End** 2025–
- Simon Vukčević – Blackburn Rovers 2012–13
- Elsad Zverotić – Fulham 2014–15
- Matija Sarkic – Aston Villa, Stoke City, Birmingham City, Millwall †

== Montserrat ==
- Brandon Comley – Queens Park Rangers 2016–17
- James Comley – Crystal Palace 2008–09
- Donervon Daniels – Blackpool, Wigan Athletic 2014–15, 2016–17
- Bruce Dyer – Watford, Stoke City, Millwall, Sheffield United 2004–06
- Rohan Ince – Brighton & Hove Albion, Fulham 2013–2016
- Dean Morgan – Reading, Luton Town 2004–07
- Lyle Taylor – Charlton Athletic, Nottingham Forest, Birmingham City 2019–22

== Morocco ==
- Nordin Amrabat – Hull City 2024–25
- Amine Bassi – Barnsley 2021–22
- Zakarya Bergdich – Charlton 2015–16
- **Ilias Chair** – **Queens Park Rangers** 2017–
- Marouane Chamakh – Cardiff City 2016–17
- Adil Chihi – Fulham 2014–15
- Mounir El Hamdaoui – Derby County 2005–06
- Faysal El Idrissi – Coventry City 2006–07
- Bilal El Khannouss – Leicester City 2025–26
- Zakaria Labyad – Fulham 2015–16
- Achraf Lazaar – Newcastle United, Sheffield Wednesday, Watford 2016–17, 2018–19, 2020–21
- **Imran Louza** – **Watford** 2022–
- **Othmane Maamma** – **Watford** 2025–
- Adam Masina – Watford 2020–21
- Ryan Mmaee – Stoke City 2023–25
- Youssef Safri – Norwich City, Southampton 2004–08
- Romain Saïss – Wolverhampton Wanderers 2016–18
- Adel Taarabt – Queens Park Rangers 2008–11
- Anass Zaroury – Burnley, Hull City 2022–25
- Merouane Zemmama – Middlesbrough 2010–13

== Mozambique ==
- Armando Sá – Leeds United 2006–07

== Namibia ==
- **Ryan Nyambe** – Blackburn Rovers, Wigan Athletic, **Derby County** 2016–17, 2018–23, 2024–

== Netherlands ==
- Nathan Aké – Reading 2014–15
- Pim Balkestein – Ipswich Town 2008–10
- **Jaydon Banel** – Derby County, **Burnley** 2025–
- Nacer Barazite – Derby County 2008–09
- Roy Beerens – Reading 2016–18
- **Myron Boadu** – **Watford** 2026–
- George Boateng – Nottingham Forest 2011–12
- Ferrie Bodde – Swansea City 2008–11
- Jeffrey Bruma – Leicester City 2010–11
- Marciano Bruma – Barnsley 2007–09
- Wouter Burger – Stoke City 2023–25
- **Delano Burgzorg** – Huddersfield Town, Middlesbrough, Bristol City, **Preston North End** 2023–
- Ellery Cairo – Coventry City 2007–08
- Ibrahim Cissoko – Plymouth Argyle, Sheffield Wednesday 2024–25
- Pelle Clement – Reading 2017–18
- Jürgen Colin – Norwich City 2005–07
- Arnaut Danjuma – Bournemouth 2020–21
- Chris David – Fulham 2014–15
- Edgar Davids – Crystal Palace 2010–11
- Marten de Roon – Middlesbrough 2017–18
- Ed de Goey – Stoke City 2004–06
- Dorus de Vries – Swansea City, Wolverhampton Wanderers, Nottingham Forest 2008–11, 2012–17
- Mark de Vries – Leicester City 2005–07
- Jordy de Wijs – Hull City, Queens Park Rangers 2018–22
- Arjan de Zeeuw – Coventry City 2007–08
- Mitchell Dijks – Norwich City 2016–17
- Royston Drenthe – Reading, Sheffield Wednesday 2013–15
- Kyle Ebecilio – Nottingham Forest 2015–16
- Carel Eiting – Huddersfield Town 2020–22
- Anwar El Ghazi – Aston Villa, Cardiff City 2018–19, 2024–25
- Abdenasser El Khayati – Queens Park Rangers – 2015–17
- Urby Emanuelson – Sheffield Wednesday 2016–17
- Marvin Emnes – Middlesbrough, Swansea City, Blackburn Rovers 2009–14, 2016–17
- Etiënne Esajas – Sheffield Wednesday 2007–10
- Leroy Fer – Norwich City, Queens Park Rangers, Swansea City 2014–16, 2018–19
- **Zian Flemming** – Millwall, **Burnley** 2022–25, 2026–
- Jimmy Floyd Hasselbaink – Cardiff City 2007–08
- Paul Gladon – Wolverhampton Wanderers 2016–17
- **Kenzo Goudmijn** – **Derby County** 2024–
- Jay-Roy Grot – Leeds United 2017–18
- **Gustavo Hamer** – Coventry City, **Sheffield United** 2020–
- Wesley Hoedt – Watford 2022–24
- **Ki-Jana Hoever** – Stoke City, **Sheffield United** 2022–24, 2025–
- Danny Holla – Brighton & Hove Albion 2014–16
- Jos Hooiveld – Southampton, Norwich City, Millwall 2011–12, 2014–15
- Lex Immers – Cardiff City 2015–17
- Daryl Janmaat – Newcastle United 2016–17
- Collins John – Leicester City, Watford 2007–08
- Ola John – Reading, Wolverhampton Wanderers 2015–17
- **Boy Kemper** – **Queens Park Rangers** 2026–
- Maikel Kieftenbeld – Birmingham City, Millwall 2015–22
- Terence Kongolo – Huddersfield Town, Fulham 2019–20
- Tim Krul – Newcastle United, Norwich City 2009–10, 2018–19, 2020–21, 2022–23
- Michel Kuipers – Brighton & Hove Albion 2004–05
- Michael Lamey – Leicester City 2010–11
- Glenn Loovens – Cardiff City, Sheffield Wednesday 2005–09, 2013–18
- Ian Maatsen – Coventry City, Burnley 2021–23
- Sherjill Mac-Donald – West Bromwich Albion 2007–08
- **Million Manhoef** – **Stoke City** 2023–
- Jahnoah Markelo – Coventry City 2025–26
- Bruno Martins Indi – Stoke City 2018–21
- Azor Matusiwa – Ipswich Town 2025–26
- Erwin Mulder – Swansea City 2018–20
- **Anthony Musaba** – Sheffield Wednesday, **Norwich City** 2023–25, 2026–
- Luciano Narsingh – Swansea City 2018–19
- Noah Ohio – Hull City 2023–24
- Erik Pieters – Stoke City, West Bromwich Albion, Derby County 2018–19, 2023–25
- Stefan Postma – Wolverhampton Wanderers 2005–06
- Berry Powel – Millwall 2005–06
- Iwan Redan – Cardiff City 2006–07
- Karim Rekik – Portsmouth, Blackburn Rovers 2011–13
- **Jaïro Riedewald** – **Sheffield United** 2025–
- Maceo Rigters – Norwich City, Barnsley 2007–09
- Kelle Roos – Rotherham United, Derby County 2015–16, 2018–22
- Ruben Roosken – Oxford United 2025–26
- Robbin Ruiter – Sunderland 2017–18
- Jan-Paul Saeijs – Southampton 2008–09
- **Jenson Seelt** – Sunderland, **Swansea City** 2023–25, 2026–
- Marcel Seip – Plymouth Argyle, Blackpool, Sheffield United 2006–10
- Andwélé Slory – West Bromwich Albion 2009–10
- **Milan Smit** – **Stoke City** 2025–
- Evander Sno – Bristol City 2009–10
- Pascal Struijk – Leeds United 2019–20, 2023–25
- Crysencio Summerville – Leeds United 2023–24
- Hidde ter Avest – Oxford United 2024–26
- Kenny Tete – Fulham 2021–22
- Mike te Wierik – Derby County 2020–21
- Dwight Tiendalli – Middlesbrough 2014–15
- Patrick van Aanholt – Coventry City, Newcastle United, Leicester City 2009–11
- Joost van Aken – Sheffield Wednesday 2017–19, 2020–21
- Joey van den Berg – Reading 2016–18
- Rav van den Berg – Middlesbrough 2023–25
- Sepp van den Berg – Preston North End 2020–22
- Cedric van der Gun – Swansea City 2009–11
- Mike van der Hoorn – Swansea City 2018–20
- Milan van Ewijk – Coventry City 2023–26
- Jan Paul van Hecke – Blackburn Rovers 2021–22
- Sydney van Hooijdonk – Norwich City 2023–24
- Rajiv van La Parra – Wolverhampton Wanders, Brighton & Hove Albion, Huddersfield Town, Middlesbrough 2014–17, 2018–20
- Jos van Nieuwstadt – Doncaster Rovers 2008–09
- Remco van der Schaaf – Burnley 2008–09
- Lars Veldwijk – Nottingham Forest 2014–15
- **Joël Veltman** – **West Ham United** 2026–
- Michael Verrips – Sheffield United 2021–22
- Wout Weghorst – Burnley 2024–25
- Yanic Wildschut – Middlesbrough, Wigan Athletic, Norwich City, Cardiff City, Bolton Wanderers 2014–19
- **Gibson Yah** – **Bristol City** 2026–
- Marvin Zeegelaar – Blackpool 2013–14
- Deyovaisio Zeefuik – Blackburn Rovers 2021–22
- Gianni Zuiverloon – West Bromwich Albion, Ipswich Town 2009–11

== New Zealand ==
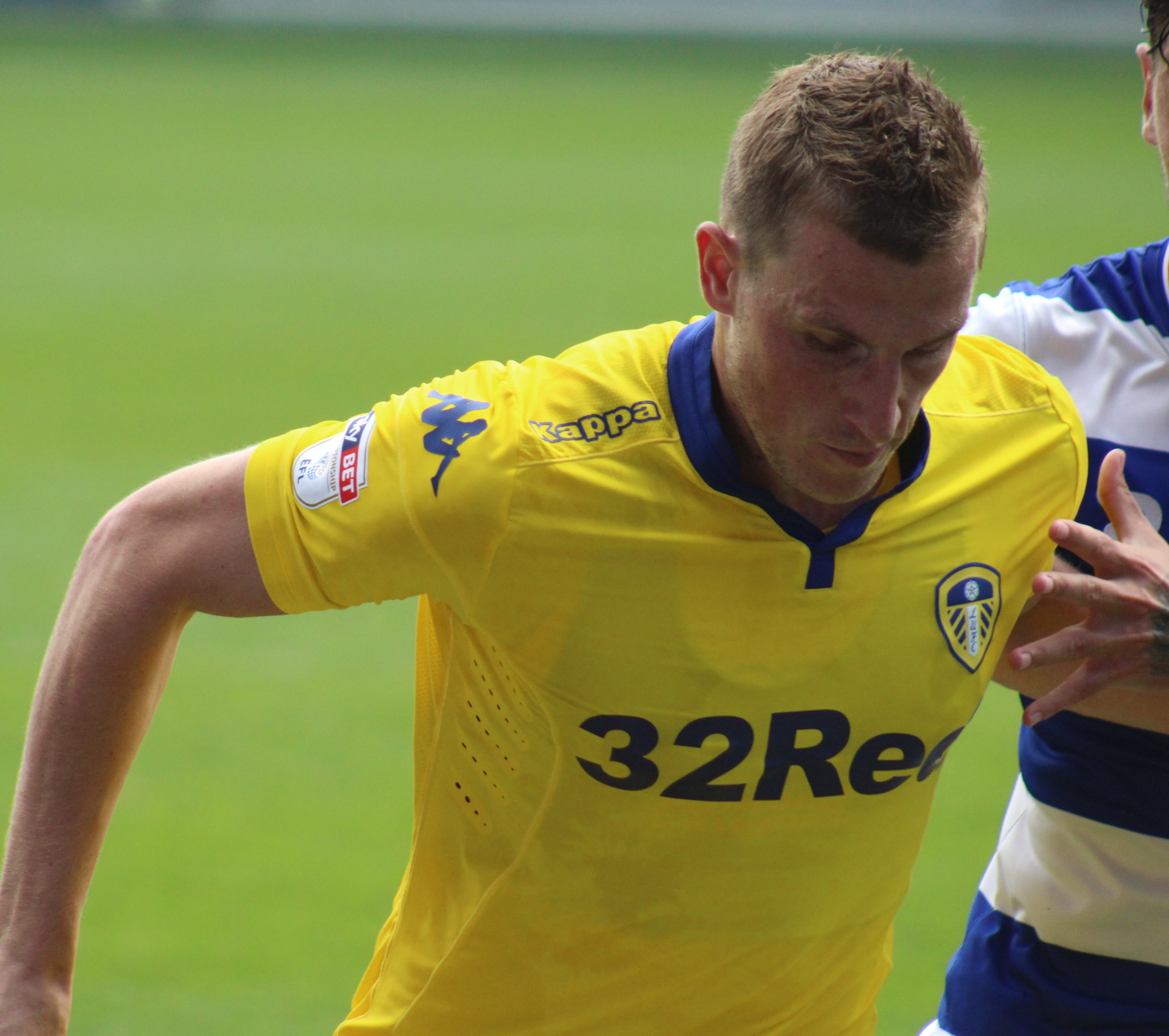
Chris Wood with the Leeds United jersey; he was top goalscorers of the 2016–17 season with 27 goals scored

- **Tyler Bindon** – Sheffield United, **Charlton Athletic** 2025–
- **Luke Brooke-Smith** – **Portsmouth** 2026–
- **Liberato Cacace** – **Wrexham** 2025–
- Henry Cameron – Blackpool 2014–15
- **Max Crocombe** – **Millwall** 2025–
- Rory Fallon – Plymouth Argyle, Ipswich Town 2006–11
- Cameron Howieson – Burnley 2011–12
- **Elijah Just** – **Swansea City** 2026–
- Chris Killen – Norwich City, Middlesbrough 2008–10
- Stefan Marinovic – Bristol City 2018–19
- Winston Reid – West Ham United, Brentford 2011–12, 2020–21
- Tommy Smith – Ipswich Town 2008–18
- **Marko Stamenić** – **Swansea City** 2025–
- Ben Waine – Plymouth Argyle 2023–25
- Chris Wood – West Bromwich Albion, Barnsley, Birmingham City, Bristol City, Millwall, Leicester City, Ipswich Town, Leeds United 2009–17

== Nigeria ==
- Dele Adebola – Coventry City, Bristol City, Nottingham Forest, Hull City 2004–12
- Victor Adeboyejo – Barnsley 2020–22
- Ola Aina – Hull City 2017–18
- Semi Ajayi – Rotherham United, West Bromwich Albion, Hull City – 2016–17, 2018–20, 2021–26
- Ade Akinbiyi – Stoke City, Burnley 2004–06, 2007–09
- David Akintola – Hull City 2025–26
- Hope Akpan – Hull City, Reading, Blackburn Rovers, Burton Albion – 2010–11, 2013–18
- **Ryan Alebiosu** – **Blackburn Rovers** 2025–
- Sone Aluko – Blackpool, Hull City, Fulham, Reading 2008–09, 2012–13, 2015–21
- Sammy Ameobi – Middlesbrough, Cardiff City, Newcastle United, Bolton Wanderers 2012–13, 2015–19
- Shola Ameobi – Stoke City, Newcastle United, Bolton Wanderers 2007–08, 2009–10, 2015–16
- Joe Aribo – Southampton, Leicester City 2023–24, 2025–26
- **Femi Azeez** – Reading, **Millwall** 2020–
- Leon Balogun – Wigan Athletic 2019–20
- Jamilu Collins – Cardiff City 2022–25
- Fisayo Dele-Bashiru – Sheffield Wednesday 2020–21
- Tom Dele-Bashiru – Watford, Reading 2020–26
- Emmanuel Dennis – Watford, Blackburn Rovers 2022–25
- Bright Enobakhare – Wolverhampton Wanders, Wigan Athletic 2015–18, 2019–20
- Peter Etebo – Stoke City 2018–20
- Dickson Etuhu – Blackburn Rovers 2012–14
- Kelvin Etuhu – Leicester City, Cardiff City, Portsmouth, Barnsley 2007–08, 2009–10, 2011–14
- Emmanuel Fernandez – Peterborough United – 2021–22
- Odion Ighalo – Watford 2014–15
- Kelechi Iheanacho – Leicester City, Middlesbrough 2023–25
- Carl Ikeme – Wolverhampton Wanderers, Sheffield United, Queens Park Rangers, Leicester City, Middlesbrough, Doncaster Rovers 2006–07, 2008–13, 2014–17
- Blessing Kaku – Derby County 2004–05
- Samuel Kalu – Watford 2022–23
- Nwankwo Kanu – Portsmouth 2010–12
- David Kasumu – Huddersfield Town 2022–24
- Ademola Lookman – Charlton Athletic 2015–16
- **Josh Maja** – Sunderland, Stoke City, **West Bromwich Albion** 2017–18, 2021–
- Victor Moses – Crystal Palace, Luton Town 2007–10, 2024–25
- Wilfred Ndidi – Leicester City 2023–24
- Mikel John Obi – Middlesbrough, Stoke City 2018–19, 2020–21
- Eric Obinna Chukwunyelu – Reading 2005–06
- Kayode Odejayi – Barnsley 2007–10
- Peter Odemwingie – Bristol City, Rotherham United 2015–17
- Nnamdi Ofoborh – Bournemouth, Wycombe Wanderers 2020–21
- Bartholomew Ogbeche – Middlesbrough 2011–12
- Jay-Jay Okocha – Hull City 2007–08
- **Arthur Okonkwo** – Wrexham, **Charlton Athletic** 2025–
- Michael Olise – Reading 2018–21
- Egutu Oliseh – Queens Park Rangers 2006–07
- Seyi Olofinjana – Wolverhampton Wanderers, Cardiff City, Hull City, Sheffield Wednesday 2004–08, 2010–13
- Kenneth Omeruo – Middlesbrough 2013–15
- Fred Onyedinma – Millwall, Wycombe Wanderers, Luton Town, Rotherham United 2013–15, 2017–19, 2020–24
- Frank Onyeka – Coventry City 2025–26
- **Bright Osayi-Samuel** – Blackpool, Queens Park Rangers, **Birmingham City** 2014–15, 2017–21, 2025–
- **Gabriel Osho** – Reading, Luton Town, **Cardiff City** 2018–20, 2021–23, 2026–
- Danny Shittu – Queens Park Rangers, Watford, Millwall 2004–06, 2007–08, 2010–11 2012–14
- Enoch Showunmi – Luton, Bristol City, Sheffield Wednesday, 2005–06, 2007–08
- Efe Sodje – Southend United 2006–07
- Onome Sodje – Barnsley 2009–10
- Sam Sodje – West Bromwich Albion, Charlton Athletic, Watford – 2006–09
- Viv Solomon-Otabor – Birmingham City 2015–17, 2018–19
- Isaac Success – Watford 2020–21
- Solomon Taiwo – Cardiff City 2009–10, 2011–12
- Muhamed Tijani – Plymouth Argyle 2024–25
- William Troost-Ekong – Watford 2020–21, 2022–23
- Ugo Ukah – Queens Park Rangers 2005–06
- John Utaka – Portsmouth 2010–11
- Taribo West – Plymouth Argyle 2005–06
- Yakubu – Leicester City, Reading 2010–11, 2014–15

== North Macedonia ==
- Ezgjan Alioski – Leeds United 2017–20
- Darko Churlinov – Burnley 2022–23
- Dejan Stojanović – Middlesbrough 2019–20
- Veliče Šumulikoski – Ipswich Town, Preston North End 2008–10

== Norway ==
- Thelo Aasgaard – Wigan Athletic, Luton Town 2022–23, 2024–25
- Torbjørn Agdestein – Brighton & Hove Albion 2011–13
- **Edvin Austbø** – **West Ham United** 2026–
- Eirik Bakke – Leeds United 2004–06
- Sander Berge – Sheffield United 2021–23
- John Carew – West Ham United 2011–12
- Jesper Daland – Cardiff City 2024–25
- Adama Diomande – Hull City 2015–16, 2017–18
- Sindre Walle Egeli – Ipswich Town 2025–26
- Magnus Wolff Eikrem – Cardiff City 2014–15
- Tore André Flo – Leeds United 2006–07
- **Aune Heggebø** – **West Bromwich Albion** 2025–
- Torbjørn Heggem – West Bromwich Albion 2024–26
- Markus Henriksen – Hull City, Bristol City 2017–20
- Jon Olav Hjelde – Nottingham Forest 2004–05
- Leo Hjelde – Rotherham United, Leeds United, Sunderland, Sheffield United 2022–26
- **Felix Horn Myhre** – **West Bromwich Albion** 2026–
- Erik Huseklepp – Portsmouth, Birmingham City 2011–12
- Abdisalam Ibrahim – Scunthorpe United 2010–11
- Steffen Iversen – Crystal Palace 2010–12
- Stefan Johansen – Fulham, West Bromwich, Queens Park Rangers 2016–23
- Christian Kalvenes – Burnley 2008–09
- Joshua King – Preston North End, Hull City, Blackburn Rovers, Bournemouth 2010–15, 2020–21
- Kristoffer Klaesson – Leeds United 2023–24
- **Sondre Langås** – **Derby County** 2024–
- Rocky Lekaj – Sheffield Wednesday 2007–09
- Claus Lundekvam – Southampton 2005–07
- Sivert Mannsverk – Cardiff City 2024–25
- Mats Møller Dæhli – Cardiff City 2014–15
- Thomas Myhre – Sunderland 2004–05
- Lasse Nordås – Luton Town 2024–25
- Ørjan Nyland – Aston Villa, Bournemouth, Reading 2018–19, 2021–22
- Sverre Nypan – Middlesbrough 2025–26
- Leo Skiri Østigård – Coventry City, Stoke City 2020–22
- Jonathan Parr – Crystal Palace, Ipswich Town 2011–13, 2014–16
- Marcus Pedersen – Barnsley 2013–14
- Morten Gamst Pedersen – Blackburn Rovers 2012–13
- Bjørn Helge Riise – Sheffield United, Portsmouth 2010–12
- Thomas Rogne – Wigan Athletic 2013–14
- **Lars-Jørgen Salvesen** – **Derby County** 2024–
- Martin Samuelsen – Blackburn Rovers, Burton Albion, Hull City 2016–18, 2019–20
- **Egil Selvik** – **Watford** 2024–
- Vemund Brekke Skard – Ipswich Town 2005–06
- Jo Tessem – Millwall 2004–05
- Alexander Tettey – Norwich City 2014–15, 2016–19, 2020–21
- Erik Tønne – Sheffield United 2010–11
- **Sondre Tronstad** – **Blackburn Rovers** 2023–
- Fredrik Ulvestad – Burnley 2015–16
- Petter Vaagan Moen – Queens Park Rangers 2010–11
- **David Møller Wolfe** – **Wolverhampton Wanderers** 2026–

== Oman ==
- Ali Al-Habsi – Wigan Athletic, Brighton & Hove Albion, Reading 2013–17

== Pakistan ==
- Zesh Rehman – Norwich City, Queens Park Rangers, Blackpool 2005–09

== Panama ==
- **José Córdoba** – **Norwich City** 2024–

== Paraguay ==
- Javier Acuña – Watford 2013–14
- Gustavo Caballero – Portsmouth 2025–26
- Brian Montenegro – Leeds United 2014–15
- Braian Ojeda – Nottingham Forest 2021–22

== Peru ==
- Cristian Benavente – Milton Keynes Dons 2015–16
- Paolo Hurtado – Reading 2015–16
- Miguel Mostto – Barnsley 2008–09
- Diego Penny – Burnley 2008–09
- Nolberto Solano – Leicester City, Hull City 2009–11
- **Oliver Sonne** – **Burnley** – 2024–25, 2026–

== Philippines ==
- Neil Etheridge – Charlton, Cardiff City, Birmingham City 2014–15, 2017–18, 2019–24

== Poland ==
- Jan Bednarek – Southampton 2023–24
- Bartosz Białkowski – Southampton, Barnsley, Ipswich Town, Millwall 2005–08, 2009–10, 2011–12, 2014–24
- **Daniel Bielica** – **Portsmouth** 2026–
- **Krystian Bielik** – Birmingham City, Derby County, West Bromwich Albion, **Cardiff City** 2016–17, 2019–24, 2025–
- Mateusz Bogusz – Leeds United 2019–20
- Ariel Borysiuk – Queens Park Rangers 2016–17
- Artur Boruc – Bournemouth 2014–15
- Matty Cash – Nottingham Forest 2016–20
- Bartosz Cybulski – Derby County 2021–22
- Tomasz Cywka – Derby County, Reading, Barnsley, Blackpool 2009–15
- Adam Czerkas – Queens Park Rangers 2006–07
- Dariusz Dudka – Birmingham City 2013–14
- Tomasz Frankowski – Wolverhampton Wanderers 2005–06
- Kamil Grabara – Huddersfield Town 2019–20
- Kamil Grosicki – Hull City, West Bromwich Albion 2017–20
- Tomasz Hajto – Southampton, Derby County 2005–06
- Michał Helik – Barnsley, Huddersfield Town, Oxford United 2020–26
- Kamil Jóźwiak – Derby County 2020–22
- Przemysław Kaźmierczak – Derby County 2008–09
- Mateusz Klich – Leeds United 2017–20
- Olaf Kobacki – Sheffield Wednesday 2024–26
- Kamil Kosowski – Southampton 2005–06
- Artur Krysiak – Swansea City 2008–09
- Marcin Kuś – Queens Park Rangers 2005–06
- Tomasz Kuszczak – Watford, Brighton & Hove Albion, Wolverhampton Wanderers, Birmingham City 2011–18
- Radosław Majewski – Nottingham Forest, Huddersfield Town 2009–15
- Piotr Malarczyk – Ipswich Town 2015–16
- Paweł Olkowski – Bolton Wanderers 2018–19
- Piotr Parzyszek – Charlton Athletic 2013–14
- Damien Perquis – Nottingham Forest 2016–17
- Sławomir Peszko – Wolverhampton Wanderers 2012–13
- Przemysław Płacheta – Norwich City, Birmingham City, Swansea City, Oxford United 2020–21, 2022–26
- Tymoteusz Puchacz – Plymouth Argyle 2024–25
- Grzegorz Rasiak – Derby County, Southampton, Watford, Reading 2004–11
- Marek Saganowski – Southampton 2006–09
- Grzegorz Sandomierski – Blackburn Rovers 2012–13
- Bartosz Ślusarski – West Bromwich Albion, Blackpool, Sheffield Wednesday 2007–09
- Jakub Stolarczyk – Leicester City 2023–24, 2025–26
- Marcin Wasilewski – Leicester City 2013–14
- Paweł Wszołek – Queens Park Rangers 2016–19
- Michał Żyro – Wolverhampton Wanderers 2015–16

== Portugal ==
- Bruno Andrade – Queens Park Rangers 2010–11
- Henrique Araújo – Watford 2022–23
- Betinho – Brentford 2014–15
- Cafú – Nottingham Forest, Rotherham United 2020–22, 2023–24
- João Carvalho – Nottingham Forest 2018–20, 2021–22
- Joel Castro Pereira – Huddersfield Town 2020–21
- Quévin Castro – West Bromwich Albion – 2021–22
- Ivan Cavaleiro – Wolverhampton Wanderers, Fulham 2016–18, 2019–20, 2021–22
- Chiquinho – Stoke City 2023–24
- Gil Dias – Nottingham Forest 2018–19
- Tomás Esteves – Reading 2020–21
- Carlos Fangueiro – Millwall 2005–06
- Bruno Fernandes – Sheffield Wednesday 2025–26
- Mateus Fernandes – Southampton 2025–26
- João Ferreira – Watford 2022–23
- Tobias Figueiredo – Nottingham Forest, Hull City 2017–23
- Rafael Floro – Sheffield Wednesday 2013–14
- José Fonte – Crystal Palace, Southampton 2007–10, 2011–12
- Rui Fonte – Crystal Palace, Fulham 2008–09, 2017–18
- **Gonçalo Franco** – **Swansea City** 2024–
- Nuno Gomes – Blackburn Rovers 2012–13
- **Rodrigo Gomes** – **Wolverhampton Wanderers** 2026–
- Tiago Gomes – Blackpool 2012–13
- **Toti Gomes** – **Wolverhampton Wanderers** 2026–
- Diogo Gonçalves – Nottingham Forest 2018–19
- Tiago Ilori – Reading 2016–19
- Paulo Jorge – Blackburn Rovers 2012–13
- Diogo Jota – Wolverhampton Wanderers 2017–18
- Edinho Júnior – Blackburn Rovers 2012–13
- Licá – Nottingham Forest 2016–17
- Leonardo Lopes – Wigan, Hull City 2018–20
- **Mateus Mané** – **Wolverhampton Wanderers** 2026–
- Wanya Marçal – Leicester City 2023–24
- Marco Matias – Sheffield Wednesday 2015–19
- Filipe Melo – Sheffield Wednesday 2015–16
- Nuno Mendes – Plymouth Argyle 2005–06
- Roderick Miranda – Wolverhampton Wanderers 2017–18
- Filipe Morais – Bolton Wanderers 2017–18
- Moreno – Leicester City 2010–11
- Rúben Neves – Wolverhampton Wanderers 2017–18
- Fábio Nunes – Blackburn Rovers 2012–14
- Filipe Oliveira – Preston North End 2004–05
- Nélson Oliveira – Nottingham Forest, Norwich City, Reading 2015–19
- **Pablo** – **West Ham United** 2026–
- **Tiago Parente** – **Swansea City** 2026–
- Hildeberto Pereira – Nottingham Forest 2016–17
- Pedro Pereira – Bristol City 2019–20
- Ricardo Pereira – Leicester City 2023–24, 2025–26
- Ivo Pinto – Norwich City 2016–19
- Domingos Quina – Watford, Fulham, Barnsley 2020–
- **Yuri Ribeiro** – Nottingham Forest, **Blackburn Rovers** 2019–21, 2024–
- Ricardo – Leicester City 2010–11
- Ricardo Rocha – Portsmouth 2010–12
- Rochinha – Bolton Wanderers 2014–15
- **Rúben Rodrigues** – Oxford United, **Bolton Wanderers** 2024–25, 2026–
- Diogo Rosado – Blackburn Rovers 2012–13
- **José Sá** – **Wolverhampton Wanderers** 2026–
- Orlando Sá – Reading 2015–16
- José Semedo – Charlton Athletic, Sheffield Wednesday 2007–09, 2012–17
- Luís Semedo – Sunderland 2023–24
- **Vivaldo Semedo** – **Watford** 2025–
- Tiago Silva – Nottingham Forest 2019–20
- Xande Silva – Nottingham Forest 2021–22
- Sílvio – Wolverhampton Wanderers 2016–17
- Rafa Soares – Fulham 2017–18
- Fábio Tavares – Coventry City 2021–25
- **Sidnei Tavares** – **Blackburn Rovers** 2025–
- Filipe Teixeira – West Bromwich Albion, Barnsley 2007–08, 2009–10
- João Teixeira – Wolverhampton Wanderers 2016–17
- João Carlos Teixeira – Brighton & Hove Albion 2014–15
- Jorge Teixeira – Charlton 2015–17
- Tininho – West Bromwich Albion, Barnsley 2007–08
- Ricardo Vaz Tê – Hull City, Barnsley, West Ham United, Charlton Athletic 2006–07, 2011–12, 2015–16
- Frederico Venâncio – Sheffield Wednesday 2017–18
- Rúben Vinagre – Wolverhampton Wanderers, Hull City 2017–18, 2023–24
- **João Virgínia** – Reading, **Wolverhampton Wanderers** 2019–20, 2026–

== Romania ==
- Sergiu Buș – Sheffield Wednesday 2014–15
- **Andrei Coubiș** – **Lincoln City** 2026–
- Alex Dobre – Wigan Athletic 2019–20
- **Lisav Eissat** – **Bristol City** 2026–
- Ionel Ganea – Wolverhampton Wanderers 2005–06
- Ștefan Iovan – Brighton & Hove Albion 1990–92
- Costel Pantilimon – Nottingham Forest 2017–19
- Adrian Popa – Reading 2016–19
- George Pușcaș – Reading 2019–22
- Gabriel Tamaș – West Bromwich Albion, Doncaster Rovers, Watford, Cardiff 2009–10, 2013–16
- George Țucudean – Charlton Athletic 2014–15

== Russia ==
- Pavel Pogrebnyak – Reading 2013–15

== Saint Kitts and Nevis ==
- Febian Brandy – Swansea City, Rotherham United 2008–09, 2014–15
- Rowan Liburd – Reading 2015–16
- Harry Panayiotou – Leicester City 2011–12
- Romaine Sawyers – Brentford, West Bromwich Albion, Stoke City, Cardiff City 2016–20, 2021–24
- **Tyrese Shade** – **Portsmouth** 2026–

== Saint Lucia ==
- Janoi Donacien – Ipswich Town 2018–19, 2023–24
- **Reeco Hackett-Fairchild** – **Lincoln City** 2026–

== Senegal ==
- Habib Beye – Doncaster Rovers 2011–12
- Papa Bouba Diop – West Ham United, Birmingham City 2011–13
- Henri Camara – Sheffield United 2009–10
- **Madiodio Dia** – **Portsmouth** 2025–
- Bambo Diaby – Barnsley, Preston North End, Sheffield Wednesday 2019–20, 2021–24
- **Papa Amadou Diallo** – **Norwich City** 2025–
- Mohamed Diamé – Hull City, Newcastle United 2015–17
- Salif Diao – Stoke City 2006–08
- **Krépin Diatta** – **Watford** 2026–
- Lamine Diatta – Doncaster Rovers 2011–12
- Famara Diédhiou – Bristol City, Cardiff City 2017–21, 2023–24
- **Seny Dieng** – Queens Park Rangers, **Middlesbrough** 2020–
- El Hadji Diouf – Doncaster Rovers, Leeds United 2011–14
- **El Hadji Malick Diouf** – **West Ham United** 2026–
- Mame Biram Diouf – Stoke City 2018–20
- Khalilou Fadiga – Derby County, Coventry City 2005–07
- Abdoulaye Faye – West Ham United, Hull City 2011–13
- Amdy Faye – Charlton Athletic, Leeds United 2007–08, 2010–11
- Morgaro Gomis – Birmingham City 2011–13
- Magaye Gueye – Millwall 2014–15
- Makhtar Gueye – Blackburn Rovers 2024–26
- Diomansy Kamara – West Bromwich Albion, Leicester City 2006–07, 2010–11
- Mamadou Loum – Reading 2022–23
- **Amadou Mbengue** – Reading, **Queens Park Rangers** 2022–23, 2025–
- Formose Mendy – Watford 2025–26
- Nampalys Mendy – Watford 2025–26
- Guirane N'Daw – Birmingham City, Ipswich Town 2011–13
- Alfred N'Diaye – Wolverhampton Wanderers 2017–18
- Cheikh N'Doye – Birmingham City 2017–19
- Pape Alioune Ndiaye – Stoke City 2018–20
- Iliman Ndiaye – Sheffield United 2021–23
- Ismaïla Sarr – Watford 2020–21, 2022–23
- Naby Sarr – Charlton, Huddersfield Town, Reading 2015–16, 2019–23
- Mamadou Seck – Scunthorpe United 2007–08
- **Kaly Sène** – **Middlesbrough** 2025–
- Abdallah Sima – Stoke City 2021–22
- Ibrahima Sonko – Reading, Portsmouth, Ipswich Town 2004–06, 2010–12
- Modou Sougou – Sheffield Wednesday – 2015–16
- **Djibril Soumaré** – Sheffield United, **Stoke City** 2025–
- Mickaël Tavares – Middlesbrough 2010–11
- Mamadou Thiam – Barnsley 2017–18, 2019–20
- Armand Traoré – Queens Park Rangers 2013–14

== Serbia ==
- Milan Aleksić – Sunderland 2024–25
- Marko Dmitrović – Charlton 2014–15
- Marko Grujić – Cardiff City – 2017–18
- **Mihailo Ivanović** – **Millwall** 2024–
- Nikola Jojić – Stoke City 2023–24
- Goran Lovre – Barnsley 2010–11
- Miloš Luković – Preston North End 2025–26
- David Milinković – Hull City 2018–19
- **Marko Milovanović** – **Portsmouth** 2026–
- Aleksandar Mitrović – Newcastle United, Fulham 2016–18, 2019–20, 2021–22
- Uroš Račić – West Bromwich Albion 2024–25
- Bojan Radulović – Huddersfield Town 2023–24
- Dejan Stefanović – Norwich City 2008–09
- Vladimir Stojković – Nottingham Forest 2016–17
- Dejan Tetek – Reading 2020–23
- **Mirko Topić** – **Norwich City** 2025–
- Duško Tošić – Queens Park Rangers 2009–10
- Miloš Veljković – Middlesbrough, Charlton 2014–16
- Nikola Žigić – Birmingham City 2011–15

== Seychelles ==
- Kevin Betsy – Bristol City 2007–08
- Michael Mancienne – Queens Park Rangers, Wolverhampton Wanderers, Nottingham Forest – 2006–09, 2014–18

== Sierra Leone ==
- Amadou Bakayoko – Coventry City 2020–21
- Al Bangura – Watford, Blackpool 2004–07, 2008–10
- **Alex Bangura** – **Middlesbrough** 2023–24, 2025–
- Mustapha Bundu – Plymouth Argyle 2023–25
- Steven Caulker – Bristol City, Queens Park Rangers, Wigan Athletic 2010–11, 2016–18, 2022–23
- Curtis Davies – Luton Town, West Bromwich Albion, Leicester City, Birmingham City, Hull City, Derby County – 2005–07, 2010–13, 2015–16, 2017–22
- Mustapha Dumbuya – Doncaster Rovers 2009–12
- Tyrese Fornah – Nottingham Forest, Reading, Derby County – 2021–23, 2024–25
- Sullay Kaikai – Blackpool 2016–17
- Osman Kakay – Queens Park Rangers 2016–24
- Kei Kamara – Middlesbrough 2013–14
- Malvin Kamara – Cardiff 2006–07
- Medo Kamara – Bolton Wanderers 2012–15
- Idris Kanu – Peterborough United 2021–22
- **Augustus Kargbo** – **Blackburn Rovers** 2024–
- Josh Koroma – Huddersfield Town 2019–24
- Hindolo Mustapha – West Bromwich Albion 2025–26

== Slovakia ==
- **Róbert Boženík** – **Stoke City** 2025–
- Peter Brezovan – Brighton & Hove Albion 2011–14
- Marek Čech – West Bromwich Albion 2009–10
- Ján Greguš – Bolton Wanderers 2012–13
- Filip Kiss – Cardiff City 2011–13
- Milan Lalkovič – Doncaster Rovers 2011–12
- Marko Maroši – Coventry City 2020–21
- **Ivan Mesík** – **Charlton Athletic** 2026–
- Ľubomír Michalík – Leeds United 2006–07
- **Tomáš Rigo** – **Stoke City** 2025–
- Marek Rodák – Rotherham United, Fulham 2018–20, 2021–22
- Albert Rusnák – Birmingham City 2013–14
- **David Strelec** – **Middlesbrough** 2025–
- Peter Štyvar – Bristol City 2008–09
- Pavol Šuhaj – Crewe Alexandra 2005–06
- Stanislav Varga – Sunderland, Burnley 2006–08

== Slovenia ==
- Žan Benedičič – Leeds United 2014–15
- Žan Celar – Queens Park Rangers 2024–26
- Boštjan Cesar – West Bromwich Albion 2007–08
- Jon Gorenc Stanković – Huddersfield Town 2016–17, 2019–20
- **Tomi Horvat** – **Bristol City** 2025–
- Bojan Jokić – Nottingham Forest 2015–16
- Robert Koren – West Bromwich Albion, Hull City 2007–08, 2009–13
- Jan Mlakar – Queens Park Rangers, Wigan Athletic 2019–20
- Nejc Pečnik – Sheffield Wednesday 2012–13
- Nik Prelec – Oxford United 2025–26
- Andraž Šporar – Middlesbrough – 2021–22
- Jure Travner – Reading 2014–15
- Etien Velikonja – Cardiff City 2012–13
- **Žan Vipotnik** – **Swansea City** 2024–
- Haris Vučkić – Newcastle United, Cardiff City 2009–10, 2011–12

== Somalia ==
- Abdi Sharif – Wigan Athletic 2022–23

== South Africa ==
- Kagisho Dikgacoi – Crystal Palace, Cardiff City 2010–13, 2014–16
- Mark Fish – Ipswich Town 2005–06
- Quinton Fortune – Doncaster Rovers 2009–10
- Lyle Foster – Burnley – 2022–23, 2024–25
- Dean Furman – Doncaster Rovers 2013–14
- Bongani Khumalo – Reading, Doncaster Rovers 2011–12, 2013–14
- **Luke Le Roux** – **Portsmouth** 2025–
- Aaron Mokoena – Portsmouth 2010–12
- Kamohelo Mokotjo – Brentford 2017–20
- Kgosi Ntlhe – Peterborough United 2011–13
- Matty Pattison – Norwich City 2007–08
- Lucas Radebe – Leeds United 2004–05
- Tokelo Rantie – Bournemouth 2013–15
- Bally Smart – Norwich City 2006–07
- **Tylon Smith** – **Queens Park Rangers** 2025–
- Davide Somma – Leeds United 2010–13
- Lars Veldwijk – Nottingham Forest 2014–15, 2016–17

== South Korea ==
- **Bae Jun-ho** – **Stoke City** 2023–
- **Eom Ji-sung** – **Swansea City** 2024–
- Hwang Ui-jo – Norwich City 2023–24
- Jeon Jin-woo – Oxford United 2025–26
- Kim Bo-kyung – Cardiff City, Wigan Athletic 2012–13, 2014–15
- Kim Do-heon – West Bromwich Albion 2007–08
- Lee Chung-yong – Bolton Wanderers 2012–15
- **Paik Seung-ho** – **Birmingham City** 2023–24, 2025–
- Park Chu-young – Watford 2013–14
- Seol Ki-hyeon – Wolverhampton Wanderers 2004–06
- Yang Min-hyeok – Queens Park Rangers, Portsmouth, Coventry City 2024–26
- Yun Suk-young – Queens Park Rangers, Doncaster Rovers, Charlton Athletic 2013–14, 2015–16

== Spain ==
- Raúl Albentosa – Derby County 2014–15
- Manuel Almunia – West Ham United, Watford 2011–14
- Marcos Alonso – Bolton Wanderers 2012–13
- Daniel Ayala – Hull City, Derby County, Nottingham Forest, Middlesbrough, Blackburn Rovers, Rotherham United 2010–11, 2012–16, 2017–24
- Iván Azón – Ipswich Town 2025–26
- Borja Bastón – Swansea City 2019–20
- Guillem Bauzà – Swansea City 2008–10
- Héctor Bellerín – Watford 2013–14
- **Adama Boiro** – **West Ham United** 2026–
- Miguel Ángel Brau – Coventry City 2025–26
- **Iker Bravo** – **Watford** 2026–
- Alberto Bueno – Derby County 2010–11
- **Hugo Bueno** – **Wolverhampton Wanderers** 2026–
- Bruno – Brighton & Hove Albion 2012–17
- Cala – Cardiff City 2014–15
- Iñigo Calderón – Brighton & Hove Albion 2011–16
- Iván Calero – Derby County 2014–15
- Iván Campo – Ipswich Town 2008–09
- Sergi Canós – Brentford, Norwich City 2015–21
- Álvaro Carreras – Preston North End – 2022–23
- José Manuel Casado – Bolton Wanderers 2015–16
- Kiko Casilla – Leeds United 2018–20
- Cristian Ceballos – Charlton 2015–16
- Chema – Nottingham Forest 2019–20
- Adrián Colunga – Brighton & Hove Albion 2014–15
- Pablo Couñago – Ipswich Town, Crystal Palace 2007–11
- Carlos Cuéllar – Norwich City 2014–15
- Damià – Middlesbrough 2014–15
- Marc de Val – Doncaster Rovers 2013–14
- Derik – Bolton Wanderers 2015–16, 2017–18
- Hugo Díaz – Leeds United 2017–18
- José Enrique – Newcastle United 2009–10
- Iago Falque – Southampton 2011–12
- Lamine Fanne – Luton Town 2024–25
- Kiko Femenía – Watford 2020–21
- Álex Fernández – Reading 2015–16
- Miguel Fernández – Birmingham City 2019–20
- Juan Rafael Fuentes – Nottingham Forest 2017–18
- Jesús Gámez – Newcastle United 2016–17
- Javier Garrido – Norwich City 2014–15
- Mario Gaspar – Watford – 2022–23
- Alexandre Geijo – Watford 2012–13
- Álvaro Giménez – Birmingham City 2019–20
- Jordi Gómez – Swansea City, Wigan Athletic, Blackburn Rovers 2008–09, 2013–14, 2015–17
- Esteban Granero – Queens Park Rangers 2013–14
- Javi Guerra – Cardiff City 2014–15
- Miguel Ángel Guerrero – Nottingham Forest 2020–21
- Pablo Hernández – Leeds United 2016–20
- Pablo Ibáñez – Birmingham City 2011–13
- Iñigo Idiakez – Derby County, Southampton, Queens Park Rangers 2004–08
- Mateo Joseph – Leeds United 2023–25
- Jota – Brentford, Birmingham City 2014–19
- Jozabed – Fulham 2016–17
- Kike García – Middlesbrough 2014–16
- Bojan Krkić – Stoke City 2018–19
- **Gaizka Larrazabal** – **Bolton Wanderers** 2026–
- Diego León – Barnsley 2007–09
- Miguel Llera – Blackpool, Sheffield Wednesday 2011–14
- Álex López – Sheffield Wednesday 2015–16
- Cristian López – Huddersfield Town 2013–14
- David López – Brighton & Hove Albion 2012–14
- **Fer López** – **Wolverhampton Wanderers** 2026–
- Jordi López – Queens Park Rangers, Swansea City 2008–11
- Ángel Martínez – Blackpool, Millwall 2011–15
- Eliezer Mayenda – Sunderland 2023–25
- Agus Medina – Birmingham City 2019–20
- Tomás Mejías – Middlesbrough 2013–15
- Ignasi Miquel – Leicester City 2013–14
- Rafa Mir – Wolverhampton Wanderers, Nottingham Forest 2017–18, 2019–20
- Marc Navarro – Watford 2020–21
- Alberto Noguera – Blackpool 2012–13
- Emilio Nsue – Middlesbrough, Birmingham City 2014–18
- Edu Oriol – Blackpool 2014–15
- Joan Oriol – Blackpool 2014–15
- Andrea Orlandi – Swansea City, Brighton & Hove Albion, Blackpool 2008–11, 2012–15
- Dani Pacheco – Norwich City 2010–11
- Rubén Palazuelos – Yeovil Town 2013–14
- Dani Parejo – Queens Park Rangers 2008–09
- Alfonso Pedraza – Leeds United 2016–17
- Ayoze Pérez – Newcastle United 2016–17
- Dani Pinillos – Nottingham Forest, Barnsley 2016–18, 2019–20
- Gorka Pintado – Swansea City 2008–10
- Pipa – Huddersfield Town 2020–22
- Julio Pleguezuelo – Plymouth Argyle 2023–25
- Maurizio Pochettino – Watford 2020–21
- Xavi Quintillà – Norwich City 2020–21
- Iván Ramis – Wigan Athletic 2013–15
- Àngel Rangel – Swansea City, Queens Park Rangers 2008–11, 2018–20
- David Raya – Blackburn Rovers, Brentford 2014–17, 2019–21
- Diego Rico – Bournemouth – 2020–21
- Albert Riera – Watford 2013–14
- Arnau Riera – Sunderland, Southend United 2006–07
- Oriol Riera – Wigan Athletic 2014–15
- Rodrigo Riquelme – Bournemouth 2020–21
- Rubén Rochina – Blackburn Rovers 2012–14
- Rodri – Sheffield Wednesday, Bristol City 2012–13, 2019–20
- David Rodríguez – Brighton & Hove Albion 2013–14
- Oriol Romeu – Southampton 2025–26
- Borja Sainz – Norwich City 2023–25
- Samuel Sáiz – Leeds United 2017–19
- Mikel San José – Birmingham City 2020–21
- Iván Sánchez – Birmingham City 2020–22
- Albert Serrán – Swansea City 2008–11
- Sito – Ipswich Town 2005–08
- Kike Sola – Middlesbrough 2015–16
- Marcos Tébar – Brentford 2014–15
- Jon Toral – Brentford, Birmingham City, Hull City 2014–16, 2017–21
- Adama Traoré – Aston Villa, Middlesbrough 2016–18
- **Kareem Tunde** – **West Bromwich Albion** 2026–
- Juan Ugarte – Crewe Alexandra 2005–06
- **Pol Valentín** – Sheffield Wednesday, **Preston North End** – 2023–
- Borja Valero – West Bromwich Albion 2009–10
- Álex Vallejo – Huddersfield Town 2020–22
- Juan Velasco – Norwich City 2007–08
- Vicente – Brighton & Hove Albion 2011–13
- **Carlos Vicente** – **Birmingham City** 2025–
- Fran Villalba – Birmingham City 2019–20
- Xisco – Newcastle United 2009–10

== Sudan ==
- Mohamed Eisa – Bristol City 2018–19

== Suriname ==
- Radinio Balker – Huddersfield Town 2023–24
- Tjaronn Chery – Queens Park Rangers 2015–17
- Anfernee Dijksteel – Charlton Athletic, Middlesbrough 2019–25
- Danzell Gravenberch – Reading 2016–17
- Florian Jozefzoon – Brentford, Derby County, Rotherham United 2016–21
- Kenneth Paal – Queens Park Rangers 2022–25
- **Joël Piroe** – Swansea City, Leeds United, **West Ham United** 2021–25, 2026–
- Fabian Wilnis – Ipswich Town 2004–08

== Sweden ==
- **Isak Alemayehu** – **Queens Park Rangers** 2025–
- Rami Al Hajj – Plymouth Argyle 2024–25
- Marcus Antonsson – Leeds United 2016–17
- Joel Asoro – Sunderland, Swansea City 2017–19
- Yasin Ayari – Coventry City, Blackburn Rovers 2023–24
- Joachim Björklund – Wolverhampton Wanderers 2004–05
- Jens Cajuste – Ipswich Town 2025–26
- Paweł Cibicki – Leeds United 2017–18
- Bojan Djordjic – Sheffield Wednesday, Plymouth Argyle 2001–02, 2005–07
- Oliver Dovin – Coventry City 2024–25
- **Noah Eile** – **Bristol City** 2025–
- **Hjalmar Ekdal** – **Burnley** – 2022–23, 2026–
- Joel Ekstrand – Watford, Bristol City, Rotherham United 2012–15, 2016–17
- Niclas Eliasson – Bristol City 2017–20
- Gustav Engvall – Bristol City 2016–18
- **Jusef Erabi** – **Preston North End** 2026–
- Patrik Gerrbrand – Leicester City 2005–06
- John Guidetti – Burnley 2010–11
- Viktor Gyökeres – Swansea City, Coventry City 2020–23
- **Axel Henriksson** – **Blackburn Rovers** 2025–
- Markus Holgersson – Wigan Athletic 2013–14
- Tobias Hysén – Sunderland 2006–07
- **Svante Ingelsson** – Sheffield Wednesday, **Stoke City** 2024–
- **Zeidane Inoussa** – **Swansea City** 2025–
- Pontus Jansson – Leeds United, Brentford 2016–21
- Andreas Johansson – Wigan Athletic 2004–05
- Nils-Eric Johansson – Leicester City 2005–07
- **Viktor Johansson** – Rotherham United, **Stoke City** 2020–21, 2022–
- Alexander Kačaniklić – Watford, Burnley, Fulham 2011–13, 2014–15
- Sebastian Larsson – Birmingham City, Hull City 2006–07, 2008–09, 2017–18
- Alexander Milošević – Nottingham Forest 2018–19
- Kerim Mrabti – Birmingham City 2018–20
- Kristoffer Nordfeldt – Swansea City 2018–19
- Robin Olsen – Sheffield United 2021–22
- Jonas Olsson – West Bromwich Albion 2009–10
- Marcus Olsson – Blackburn Rovers, Derby County 2012–19
- Martin Olsson – Blackburn Rovers, Norwich City, Swansea City 2012–13, 2014–15, 2016–17, 2018–19
- Alexander Östlund – Southampton 2005–08
- Kristoffer Peterson – Swansea City 2019–20
- Mathias Ranégie – Watford, Millwall 2013–15
- Björn Runström – Luton Town 2006–07
- Ken Sema – Watford 2020–21, 2022–25
- Rami Shaaban – Brighton & Hove Albion 2004–05
- Fredrik Stoor – Derby County 2009–10
- Michael Svensson – Southampton 2005–09
- **Melker Widell** – **Swansea City** 2025–
- **Jacob Widell Zetterström** – **Derby County** 2024–

== Switzerland ==
- Almen Abdi – Watford, Sheffield Wednesday 2012–15, 2016–18
- **Zeki Amdouni** – **Burnley** 2024–25, 2026–
- Gaetano Berardi – Leeds United 2014–20
- Bruno Berner – Leicester City 2009–12
- Christian Fassnacht – Norwich City 2023–25
- Gelson Fernandes – Leicester City 2011–12
- Michael Frey – Queens Park Rangers – 2023–26
- Eldin Jakupović – Hull City 2012–13, 2015–16
- Pajtim Kasami – Nottingham Forest 2016–17
- Timm Klose – Norwich City, Bristol City 2016–19, 2021–23
- Maheta Molango – Brighton & Hove Albion 2004–05
- Andelko Savić – Sheffield Wednesday 2013–14
- Isaac Schmidt – Leeds United 2024–25
- **Lorent Tolaj** – **Bristol City** 2026–
- Kay Voser – Fulham 2014–15
- Pascal Zuberbühler – West Bromwich Albion 2006–07

== Togo ==
- Floyd Ayité – Fulham 2016–18, 2019–20
- Razak Boukari – Wolverhampton Wanderers 2012–13
- Yoann Folly – Nottingham Forest, Southampton, Preston North End, Sheffield Wednesday, Plymouth Argyle 2004–10
- Gilles Sunu – Derby County 2009–10

== Trinidad and Tobago ==
- Chris Birchall – Coventry City 2006–09
- John Bostock – Crystal Palace, Hull City, Nottingham Forest – 2007–08, 2010–11, 2019–20
- **Rio Cardines** – **Bristol City** 2026–
- Daniel Carr – Huddersfield Town 2013–14
- Ian Cox – Gillingham 2004–05
- Carlos Edwards – Luton Town, Sunderland, Wolverhampton Wanderers, Ipswich Town, Millwall 2005–07, 2009–15
- Gavin Hoyte – Watford 2008–09
- Justin Hoyte – Middlesbrough, Millwall 2009–15
- Clayton Ince – Crewe Alexandra, Coventry City 2004–06
- Stern John – Coventry City, Derby County, Sunderland, Southampton, Bristol City, Crystal Palace, Ipswich Town 2004–10
- Kenwyne Jones – Southampton, Stoke City, Cardiff City, Bournemouth 2004–08, 2014–16
- **Justin Obikwu** – **Queens Park Rangers** 2026–
- Daniel Phillips – Watford 2020–21
- Jlloyd Samuel – Cardiff City 2010–11
- Jason Scotland – Swansea City, Ipswich Town, Barnsley 2008–09, 2010–14
- Jake Thomson – Southampton 2008–09
- Tony Warner – Cardiff City, Leeds United, Norwich City, Barnsley, Scunthorpe United 2004–08, 2010–11
- Dwight Yorke – Sunderland 2006–07

== Tunisia ==
- Aymen Belaïd – Rotherham United 2015–17
- Yohan Benalouane – Nottingham Forest – 2018–20
- **Anis Ben Slimane** – Sheffield United, **Norwich City** 2024–
- Tijani Belaïd – Hull City 2010–11
- Idris El Mizouni – Ipswich Town, Oxford United 2018–19, 2024–25
- Radhi Jaïdi – Birmingham City, Southampton 2008–09, 2011–12
- Wahbi Khazri – Sunderland 2017–18
- **Hannibal Mejbri** – Birmingham City, **Burnley** 2022–23, 2024–25, 2026–
- Bilel Mohsni – Ipswich Town 2012–13
- Mehdi Nafti – Birmingham City 2006–07, 2008–09
- Omar Rekik – Wigan Athletic 2022–23
- Yan Valery – Birmingham City, Sheffield Wednesday 2020–21, 2024–26

== Turkey ==
- Yunus Akgün – Leicester City 2023–24
- Nadir Çiftçi – Portsmouth 2010–11
- Tiago Çukur – Watford 2021–22
- Halil Dervişoğlu – Brentford, Burnley 2019–20, 2022–23
- Enis Destan – Hull City 2025–26
- Kerim Frei – Cardiff City F.C., Birmingham City 2012–13, 2016–17
- Jem Karacan – Reading, Bolton 2008–12, 2013–15, 2017–18
- Colin Kazim-Richards – Brighton & Hove Albion, Blackburn Rovers, Derby County 2005–06, 2012–13, 2020–22
- Anıl Koç – Charlton 2013–14
- **Yunus Emre Konak** – Oxford United, **Lincoln City** 2025–
- Abdülkadir Ömür – Hull City 2023–25
- Erhun Oztumer – Bolton, Charlton 2018–19, 2019–20
- Tuncay Şanlı – Middlesbrough 2009–10
- Doğukan Sinik – Hull City 2022–25
- Tamer Tuna – Charlton 2008–09
- Ozan Tufan – Hull City 2022–24
- Okay Yokuşlu – West Bromwich Albion 2022–24

== Uganda ==
- **Nathan Asiimwe** – **Charlton Athletic** 2026–
- Uche Ikpeazu – Wycombe Wanderers, Middlesbrough, Cardiff City 2020–22
- Jordan Obita – Reading, Wycombe Wanderers 2013–18, 2019–21
- Jayden Onen – Reading 2020–21
- Toby Sibbick – Barnsley 2019–22

== Ukraine ==
- Mykola Kukharevych – Swansea City 2023–24
- Serhiy Rebrov – West Ham United 2004–05
- Nazariy Rusyn – Sunderland 2023–25
- **Maksym Talovyerov** – Plymouth Argyle, **Stoke City** 2024–
- **Ivan Varfolomeyev** – **Lincoln City** 2026–

== United States ==
- Brenden Aaronson – Leeds United 2024–25
- **Patrick Agyemang** – **Derby County** 2025–
- **Max Arfsten** – **Middlesbrough** 2026–
- Gboly Ariyibi – Leeds United 2013–14
- Paul Arriola – Swansea City 2020–21
- **Sebastian Berhalter** – **Middlesbrough** 2026–
- **Luca Bombino** – **Stoke City** 2026–
- Geoff Cameron – Stoke City, Queens Park Rangers 2018–21
- **George Campbell** – **West Bromwich Albion** 2025–
- Reggie Cannon – Queens Park Rangers 2023–24
- Cameron Carter-Vickers – Sheffield United, Ipswich Town, Swansea, Stoke City, Luton Town, Bournemouth 2017–21
- Bobby Convey – Reading 2004–06, 2008–09
- Kenny Cooper – Plymouth Argyle 2009–10
- Vaughn Covil – Hull City 2022–23
- Cody Cropper – Milton Keynes Dons 2015–16
- Luca de la Torre – Fulham 2017–18, 2019–20
- Jay DeMerit – Watford 2004–06, 2007–10
- Daryl Dike – Barnsley, West Bromwich Albion 2020–26
- **Damion Downs** – **Southampton** 2025–
- Conor Doyle – Derby County 2010–13
- Leo Duru – Blackburn Rovers 2024–25
- Robbie Findley – Nottingham Forest 2010–12
- Lynden Gooch – Sunderland, Stoke City 2017–18, 2022–25
- Mike Grella – Leeds United 2010–11
- Brad Guzan – Hull City 2010–11
- Marcus Hahnemann – Reading 2004–06, 2008–09
- Stuart Holden – Bolton Wanderers, Sheffield Wednesday 2012–14
- Duane Holmes – Huddersfield Town, Yeovil Town, Derby County, Preston North End 2013–14, 2015–16, 2018–25
- Matthew Hoppe – Middlesbrough 2022–23
- Ethan Horvath – Nottingham Forest, Luton Town, Cardiff City, Sheffield Wednesday 2021–26
- Emerson Hyndman – Fulham 2014–16
- Eddie Johnson – Cardiff City, Preston North End 2008–09, 2010–11
- Jemal Johnson – Preston North End, Wolverhampton Wanderers, Leeds United 2005–07
- Danny Karbassiyoon – Ipswich Town, Burnley 2004–06
- **Charlie Kelman** – Queens Park Rangers, **Charlton Athletic** 2020–22, 2023–24, 2025–
- Eddie Lewis – Preston North End, Leeds 2004–07
- Eric Lichaj – Leeds United, Nottingham Forest, Hull City 2010–11, 2013–20
- **Kristoffer Lund** – **Birmingham City** 2026–
- **Jack McGlynn** – **Stoke City** 2026–
- Matt Miazga – Reading 2018–20
- **Aidan Morris** – **Middlesbrough** 2024–
- Jordan Morris – Swansea City 2020–21
- Andrija Novakovich – Reading 2014–15, 2019–20
- Matthew Olosunde – Rotherham United, Preston North End 2020–22
- Oguchi Onyewu – Sheffield Wednesday, Charlton 2013–15
- Will Packwood – Birmingham City 2012–15
- **Brandon Powell** – **Blackburn Rovers** 2025–
- **Rokas Pukštas** – **Middlesbrough** 2026–
- Tim Ream – Bolton Wanderers, Fulham 2012–18, 2019–20, 2021–22
- Antonee Robinson – Bolton Wanderers, Wigan Athletic, Fulham 2017–20, 2021–22
- Robbie Rogers – Leeds United 2011–12
- Josh Sargent – Norwich City 2022–26
- Brek Shea – Barnsley, Birmingham City 2013–15
- Frank Simek – Queens Park Rangers, Sheffield Wednesday 2004–10
- Jonathan Spector – Birmingham City 2011–17
- Zack Steffen – Middlesbrough 2022–23
- Jonathan Tomkinson – Norwich City 2022–23
- Auston Trusty – Birmingham City, Sheffield United 2022–23, 2024–25
- Zak Whitbread – Millwall, Norwich City, Leicester City, Derby County 2005–06, 2010–11, 2012–15
- **Caleb Wiley** – Watford, **Preston North End** 2024–
- Danny Williams – Reading, Huddersfield Town 2013–17
- Haji Wright – Coventry City 2023–26
- DeAndre Yedlin – Newcastle United 2016–17
- David Yelldell – Brighton & Hove Albion 2004–05

== Uruguay ==
- Diego Arismendi – Barnsley 2010–11
- Carlos de Pena – Middlesbrough 2015–16
- Javier Chevantón – Queens Park Rangers 2013–14
- Abel Hernández – Hull City 2015–16, 2017–18
- Diego Poyet – Charlton, Huddersfield Town, Milton Keynes Dons 2013–16
- Gastón Ramírez – Middlesbrough 2015–16
- Leandro Rodríguez – Brentford 2015–16
- Cristhian Stuani – Middlesbrough 2015–16

== Venezuela ==
- Fernando Amorebieta – Fulham, Middlesbrough 2014–16
- **Keiber Lamadrid** – **West Ham United** 2026–

== Zambia ==
- Patson Daka – Leicester City 2023–24, 2025–26

== Zimbabwe ==
- Benjani – Portsmouth 2011–12
- Onismor Bhasera – Plymouth Argyle 2009–10
- Macauley Bonne – Charlton Athletic, Queens Park Rangers 2019–21, 2022–23
- Adam Chicksen – Brighton & Hove Albion 2013–15
- **Tawanda Chirewa** – Derby County, **Wolverhampton Wanderers** 2024–25, 2026–
- **Tendayi Darikwa** – Burnley, Nottingham Forest, Wigan Athletic, **Lincoln City** 2015–16, 2017–19, 2022–23, 2026–
- Sean Fusire – Sheffield Wednesday 2025–26
- **Marshall Munetsi** – **Wolverhampton Wanderers** 2026–
- Admiral Muskwe – Wycombe Wanderers, Luton Town 2020–23
- Marvelous Nakamba – Luton Town, Sheffield Wednesday 2022–23, 2024–26
- Joey Phuthi – Sheffield Wednesday 2023–24
- Bradley Pritchard – Charlton Athletic 2012–14
- Andy Rinomhota – Reading, Cardiff City, Rotherham United 2018–25
- **Jordan Zemura** – Bournemouth, **Watford** – 2020–22, 2026–

== Notes ==
1. Born in Algeria
2. Born in Angola
3. Born in Argentina
4. Born in Australia
5. Born in Austria
6. Born in Belgium
7. Born in Bosnia and Herzegovina
8. Born in Bosnia and Herzegovina (then part of SFR Yugoslavia)
9. Born in Brazil
10. Born in Cameroon
11. Born in Cape Verde
12. Born in Croatia (then part of SFR Yugoslavia)
13. Born in Cuba
14. Born in Curaçao (constituent country of the Kingdom of the Netherlands, then part of the Netherlands Antilles)
15. Born in Czech Republic
16. Born in the Democratic Republic of the Congo (then Zaïre)
17. Born in Denmark
18. Born in England
19. Born in France
20. Born in French Guiana (Overseas territory of the French Republic)
21. Born in Georgia
22. Born in Germany
23. Born in Ghana
24. Born in Guadeloupe (Overseas territory of the French Republic)
25. Born in Guinea
26. Born in Guinea-Bissau
27. Born in Hong Kong
28. Born in Iraq
29. Born in Israel
30. Born in Italy
31. Born in Ivory Coast
32. Born in Jamaica
33. Born in Kosovo (then part of SFR Yugoslavia)
34. Born in Lebanon
35. Born in Liberia
36. Born in Libya
37. Born in Mali
38. Born in Mauritania
39. Born in Martinique (Overseas territory of the French Republic)
40. Born in Mozambique
41. Born in Montenegro (then part of FR Yugoslavia)
42. Born in the Netherlands
43. Born in New Caledonia (Overseas territory of the French Republic)
44. Born in Nigeria
45. Born in Poland
46. Born in Portugal
47. Born in the Republic of Ireland
48. Born in the Republic of the Congo
49. Born in Russia
50. Born in Senegal
51. Born in Serbia (then part of SFR Yugoslavia)
52. Born in Serbia (then part of FR Yugoslavia)
53. Born in Singapore
54. Born in Scotland
55. Born in Slovakia (then part of Czechoslovakia)
56. Born in Somalia
57. Born in Spain
58. Born in Suriname
59. Born in Suriname (then part of the Kingdom of the Netherlands)
60. Born in Swaziland
61. Born in Sweden
62. Born in Switzerland
63. Born in Tanzania
64. Born in Thailand
65. Born in Ukraine (then part of the Soviet Union)
66. Born in the United States of America
67. Born in Uzbekistan (then part of the Soviet Union)
68. Born in West Germany (now part of Germany)
69. Capped for the Albania national football team
70. Capped for the Albania national under-21 football team
71. Capped for the Albania national under-19 football team
72. Capped for the Albania national under-17 football team
73. Capped for the Australia men's national soccer team
74. Capped for the Australia men's national under-23 soccer team
75. Capped for the Australia men's national under-20 soccer team
76. Capped for the Australia men's national under-19 soccer team
77. Capped for the Australia men's national under-17 soccer team
78. Capped for the Austria national under-21 football team
79. Capped for the Austria national under-20 football team
80. Capped for the Austria national under-19 football team
81. Capped for the Austria national under-17 football team
82. Capped for the Basque Country national football team
83. Capped for the Belgium national under-23 football team
84. Capped for the Belgium national football team
85. Capped for the Belgium national under-21 football team
86. Capped for the Belgium national under-20 football team
87. Capped for the Belgium national under-19 football team
88. Capped for the Belgium national under-18 football team
89. Capped for the Belgium national under-17 football team
90. Capped for the Belgium national under-16 football team
91. Capped for the Belgium national under-15 football team
92. Capped for the Bosnia and Herzegovina national under-21 football team
93. Capped for the Brazil national under-17 football team
94. Capped for the Canada national under-20 football team
95. Capped for the Catalonia national football team
96. Capped for the Cayman Islands national football team
97. Capped for the Croatia national football team
98. Capped for the Croatia national under-21 football team
99. Capped for the Czech Republic national under-19 football team
100. Capped for the Czech Republic national under-18 football team
101. Capped for the Czech Republic national under-17 football team
102. Capped for the Denmark national under-21 football team
103. Capped for the Denmark national under-20 football team
104. Capped for the Denmark national under-19 football team
105. Capped for the Denmark national under-18 football team
106. Capped for the Denmark national under-17 football team
107. Capped for the England national football team
108. Capped for the England national football B team
109. Capped for the England national football C team
110. Capped for the England national under-21 football team
111. Capped for the England national under-20 football team
112. Capped for the England national under-19 football team
113. Capped for the England national under-18 football team
114. Capped for the England national under-17 football team
115. Capped for the England national under-16 football team
116. Capped for the England national under-15 football team
117. Capped for the Equatorial Guinea national football team
118. Capped for the France national football team
119. Capped for the France national under-21 football team
120. Capped for the France national under-20 football team
121. Capped for the France national under-19 football team
122. Capped for the France national under-18 football team
123. Capped for the France national under-17 football team
124. Capped for the France national under-16 football team
125. Capped for the Galicia national football team
126. Capped for the Germany national under-21 football team
127. Capped for the Germany national under-20 football team
128. Capped for the Germany national under-19 football team
129. Capped for the Germany national under-18 football team
130. Capped for the Germany national under-17 football team
131. Capped for the Germany national under-16 football team
132. Capped for the Germany national under-15 football team
133. Capped for the Great Britain men's Olympic football team
134. Capped for the Greece national under-19 football team
135. Capped for the Israel national under-21 football team
136. Capped for the Israel national under-19 football team
137. Capped for the Israel national under-18 football team
138. Capped for the Israel national under-15 football team
139. Capped for the Italy national under-21 football team
140. Capped for the Montenegro national under-21 football team
141. Capped for the Netherlands national football team
142. Capped for the Netherlands national under-21 football team
143. Capped for the Netherlands national under-20 football team
144. Capped for the Netherlands national under-19 football team
145. Capped for the Netherlands national under-18 football team
146. Capped for the Netherlands national under-17 football team
147. Capped for the Netherlands national under-16 football team
148. Capped for the Netherlands national under-15 football team
149. Capped for the Netherlands Antilles national football team
150. Capped for the Netherlands Antilles national under-20 football team
151. Capped for the Niger national under-17 football team
152. Capped for the Norway national under-21 football team
153. Capped for the Norway national under-17 football team
154. Capped for the Norway national under-16 football team
155. Capped for the Norway national under-15 football team
156. Capped for the Poland national under-20 football team
157. Capped for the Poland national under-19 football team
158. Capped for the Poland national under-18 football team
159. Capped for the Portugal national football team
160. Capped for the Portugal national football B team
161. Capped for the Portugal national under-23 football team
162. Capped for the Portugal national under-21 football team
163. Capped for the Portugal national under-20 football team
164. Capped for the Portugal national under-19 football team
165. Capped for the Portugal national under-18 football team
166. Capped for the Portugal national under-17 football team
167. Capped for the Portugal national under-16 football team
168. Capped for the Republic of Ireland national under-21 football team
169. Capped for the Republic of Ireland national under-19 football team
170. Capped for the Republic of Ireland national under-18 football team
171. Capped for the Republic of Ireland national under-17 football team
172. Capped for the Romania national under-17 football team
173. Capped for the Romania national under-16 football team
174. Capped for the Samoa national under-20 football team
175. Capped for the Samoa national under-17 football team
176. Capped for the Scotland national football B team
177. Capped for the Scotland national under-21 football team
178. Capped for the Scotland national under-20 football team
179. Capped for the Scotland national under-19 football team
180. Capped for the Scotland national under-17 football team
181. Capped for the Serbia national under-17 football team
182. Capped for the Spain national under-21 football team
183. Capped for the Spain national under-20 football team
184. Capped for the Spain national under-19 football team
185. Capped for the Spain national under-18 football team
186. Capped for the Spain national under-17 football team
187. Capped for the Spain national under-16 football team
188. Capped for the Sweden men's national football team
189. Capped for the Sweden national under-23 football team
190. Capped for the Sweden national under-21 football team
191. Capped for the Sweden men's national under-19 football team
192. Capped for the Sweden national under-18 football team
193. Capped for the Sweden men's national under-17 football team
194. Capped for the Sweden national under-16 football team
195. Capped for the Sweden national under-15 football team
196. Capped for the Switzerland national football team
197. Capped for the Switzerland national under-21 football team
198. Capped for the Switzerland national under-20 football team
199. Capped for the Switzerland national under-19 football team
200. Capped for the Switzerland national under-18 football team
201. Capped for the Switzerland national under-17 football team
202. Capped for the Switzerland national under-16 football team
203. Capped for the Switzerland national under-15 football team
204. Capped for the Turkey national under-21 football team
205. Capped for the United States national under-15 football team
206. Capped for the United States national under-19 football team
207. Capped for the Wales national under-21 football team
208. Capped for the Wales national under-19 football team
209. Capped for the Wales national under-17 football team
210. Capped for the Wales national under-16 football team
