= 2023–24 Swansea City A.F.C. season =

112th season in existence of Swansea City AFC

Swansea City
2023–24 season
- Owner: Swansea City Football 2002 Limited
- Chairman: Andy Coleman
- Head coach: Michael Duff (until 4 December 2023); Luke Williams (from 5 January 2024)
- Stadium: Swansea.com Stadium
- Championship: 14th
- FA Cup: Fourth round
- EFL Cup: Second round
- Top goalscorer: League: Jamal Lowe (9); All: Jamal Lowe; Jerry Yates (9 each)
- Highest home attendance: 20,005 (v. Cardiff City, March 16, 2024, EFL Championship)
- Lowest home attendance: 6,923 (v. Northampton, August 8, 2023, Carabao Cup)
- Average home league attendance: 16,586
Home colours	Away colours	Third colours

The 2023–24 season was the 112th season in the history of Swansea City and their sixth consecutive season in the Championship. The club participated in the Championship, the FA Cup, and the EFL Cup.

== First-team squad ==
As of 17 February 2024

No.	Player	Position	Nationality	Place of birth	Date of birth (age)	Previous club	Date signed	Fee	Contract end
Goalkeepers
1	Andy Fisher	GK	(England)	Wigan	12 February 1998 (age 28)	Milton Keynes Dons	11 January 2022	£475,000	30 June 2026
22	Carl Rushworth	GK	(England)	Halifax	2 July 2001 (age 25)	Brighton & Hove Albion	31 July 2023	Loan	31 May 2024
25	Lewis Webb	GK	(Wales)		12 September 2001 (age 25)	Academy	1 July 2020	Trainee	30 June 2024
29	Nathan Broome	GK	(England)	Manchester	3 January 2002 (age 24)	AFC Wimbledon	30 August 2023	Free	30 June 2026
46	Ben Hughes	GK	(Wales)		15 November 2003 (age 22)	Chippenham Town	1 July 2021	Undisclosed	30 June 2024
Defenders
2	Josh Key	RB	(England)	Torquay	19 November 1999 (age 26)	Exeter City	4 July 2023	Undisclosed	30 June 2026
5	Ben Cabango	CB	(Wales)	Cardiff	30 May 2000 (age 26)	Academy	1 July 2019	Trainee	30 June 2025
6	Harry Darling	CB	(England)	Cambridge	8 August 1999 (age 27)	Milton Keynes Dons	1 July 2022	£2,300,000	30 June 2025
14	Josh Tymon	LB	(England)	Kingston upon Hull	22 May 1999 (age 27)	Stoke City	1 September 2023	£1,885,000	30 June 2026
21	Nathan Tjoe-A-On	LB	(Indonesia)	(Netherlands) Rotterdam	22 December 2001 (age 24)	(Netherlands) Excelsior	14 August 2023	£300,000	30 June 2026
23	Nathan Wood	CB	(England)	Ingleby Barwick	31 May 2002 (age 24)	Middlesbrough	1 July 2022	Undisclosed	30 June 2024
26	Kyle Naughton	RB	(England)	Sheffield	17 November 1988 (age 37)	Tottenham Hotspur	22 January 2015	£5,000,000	30 June 2024
30	Harrison Ashby	RB	(Scotland)	(England) Milton Keynes	14 November 2001 (age 24)	Newcastle United	4 August 2023	Loan	31 May 2024
33	Bashir Humphreys	CB	(England)	Exeter	15 March 2003 (age 23)	Chelsea	1 September 2023	Loan	31 May 2024
41	Sam Parker	RB	(Wales)		7 July 2006 (age 20)	Academy	16 August 2023	Trainee	30 June 2026
50	Filip Lissah	CB	(England)		8 December 2004 (age 21)	Chelsea	1 September 2021	Free	30 June 2024
Midfielders
4	Jay Fulton	CM	(Scotland)	(England) Bolton	4 April 1994 (age 32)	(Scotland) Falkirk	31 January 2014	Undisclosed	30 June 2026
7	Joe Allen	CM	(Wales)	Carmarthen	14 March 1990 (age 36)	Stoke City	8 July 2022	Free	30 June 2024
8	Matt Grimes	CM	(England)	Exeter	15 July 1995 (age 31)	Exeter City	3 January 2015	£2,240,000	30 June 2027
18	Charlie Patino	CM	(England)	Watford	17 October 2003 (age 23)	Arsenal	11 August 2023	Loan	31 May 2024
28	Liam Walsh	CM	(England)	Huyton	15 September 1997 (age 29)	Bristol City	5 January 2018	£1,100,000	30 June 2024
31	Ollie Cooper	AM	(Wales)	(England) Derby	14 December 1999 (age 26)	Academy	1 July 2020	Trainee	30 June 2027
36	Ben Lloyd	LM	(Wales)		14 March 2005 (age 21)	Academy	1 July 2022	Trainee	30 June 2026
45	Cameron Congreve	CM	(Wales)	Blaenau Gwent	24 January 2004 (age 22)	Academy	1 July 2022	Trainee	30 June 2025
47	Azeem Abdulai	CM	(Scotland)	Glasgow	9 December 2002 (age 23)	Leicester City	1 July 2021	Free	30 June 2025
48	Joel Cotterill	AM	(Wales)		10 October 2004 (age 22)	Academy	1 July 2022	Trainee	30 June 2026
Forwards
9	Jerry Yates	CF	(England)	Doncaster	10 November 1996 (age 30)	Blackpool	12 July 2023	£2,400,000	30 June 2026
10	Jamal Lowe	RW	(Jamaica)	(England) Harrow	21 July 1994 (age 32)	Bournemouth	1 September 2023	Loan	31 May 2024
11	Josh Ginnelly	LW	(England)	Nuneaton	24 March 1997 (age 29)	(Scotland) Heart of Midlothian	3 July 2023	Free	30 June 2026
12	Jamie Paterson	SS	(England)	Coventry	20 December 1991 (age 34)	Bristol City	6 August 2021	Free	30 June 2024
17	Przemysław Płacheta	LW	(Poland)	Łowicz	23 March 1998 (age 28)	Norwich City	1 February 2024	Undisclosed	30 June 2024
19	Mykola Kuharevich	CF	(Ukraine)	Rivne Oblast	1 July 2001 (age 25)	(France) Troyes	31 July 2023	£1,725,000	30 June 2026
20	Liam Cullen	CF	(Wales)	Kilgetty	23 April 1999 (age 27)	Academy	1 July 2020	Trainee	30 June 2024
24	Charles Sagoe Jr.	LW	(England)	Kingston upon Thames	24 July 2004 (age 22)	Arsenal	1 February 2024	Loan	31 May 2024
35	Ronald	RW	(Brazil)	Corumbá	14 April 2001 (age 25)	(Brazil) Grêmio Anápolis	29 January 2024	£1,275,000	30 June 2027
49	Kyrell Wilson	RW	(England)		1 December 2004 (age 21)	Chelsea	1 July 2021	Free	30 June 2024
Out on Loan
3	Kristian Pedersen	LB	(Denmark)	Ringsted	4 August 1994 (age 32)	(Germany) 1. FC Köln	1 September 2023	Free	30 June 2025
15	Nathanael Ogbeta	LB	(England)	Salford	28 April 2001 (age 25)	Shrewsbury Town	31 January 2022	Undisclosed	30 June 2024

== Transfers ==
=== In ===
Date	Pos	Player	Transferred from	Fee	Ref.
22 June 2023	AM	Glory Nzingo (IRL) †	Stade de Reims (FRA)	Undisclosed	
3 July 2023	LW	Josh Ginnelly (ENG)	Heart of Midlothian (SCO)	Free transfer	
4 July 2023	RM	Maliq Cadogan (ENG) †	Crystal Palace (ENG)	Free transfer	
4 July 2023	RB	Joshua Key (ENG)	Exeter City (ENG)	Undisclosed	
12 July 2023	CF	Jerry Yates (ENG)	Blackpool (ENG)	Undisclosed	
31 July 2023	CF	Mykola Kukharevych (UKR)	Troyes (FRA)	Undisclosed	
14 August 2023	LB	Nathan Tjoe-A-On (INA)	Excelsior (NED)	Undisclosed	
30 August 2023	GK	Nathan Broome (ENG)	AFC Wimbledon (ENG)	Free transfer	
1 September 2023	LB	Kristian Pedersen (DEN)	1. FC Köln (GER)	Undisclosed	
1 September 2023	LB	Josh Tymon (ENG)	Stoke City (ENG)	Undisclosed	
27 November 2023	LW	Yannick Bolasie (COD)	Free agent	—N/a	
1 February 2024	LW	Przemysław Płacheta (POL)	Norwich City (ENG)	Undisclosed	

† signed for Under-21s

=== Out ===
Date	Pos	Player	Transferred to	Fee	Ref.
30 June 2023	CF	Geoffroy Bony (WAL)	Free agent	Released	
30 June 2023	CM	Corey Hurford (WAL)	Free agent	Released	
30 June 2023	CB	Joel Latibeaudiere (JAM)	Coventry City (ENG)	Released	
30 June 2023	CM	Sam Leverett (ENG)	Farsley Celtic (ENG)	Released	
30 June 2023	LB	Ryan Manning (IRL)	Southampton (ENG)	Released	
30 June 2023	CB	Jada Mawongo (SRI)	Free agent	Released	
30 June 2023	CB	David Roberts (ENG)	Free agent	Released	
30 June 2023	CM	Tivonge Rushesha (WAL)	Reading (ENG)	Released	
30 June 2023	GK	Andreas Søndergaard (DEN)	Free agent	Released	
30 June 2023	RW	Tarrelle Whittaker (ENG)	Free agent	Released	
30 June 2023	CM	Daniel Williams (WAL)	The New Saints (WAL)	Released	
30 June 2023	CB	Wasiri Williams (ENG)	Free agent	Released	
1 July 2023	CF	Michael Obafemi (IRL)	Burnley (ENG)	Undisclosed	
12 July 2023	CF	Kyle Joseph (SCO)	Blackpool (ENG)	Undisclosed	
17 July 2023	RW	Morgan Whittaker (ENG)	Plymouth Argyle (ENG)	Undisclosed	
8 August 2023	CM	Olivier Ntcham (CMR)	Samsunspor (TUR)	Undisclosed	
25 August 2023	CF	Joël Piroe (NED)	Leeds United (ENG)	Undisclosed	
30 August 2023	GK	Steven Benda (GER)	Fulham (ENG)	Undisclosed	
1 September 2023	CF	Iwan Morgan (WAL)	Brentford (ENG)	Compensation	
16 January 2024	CB	Brandon Cooper (WAL)	Leyton Orient (ENG)	Undisclosed	
29 January 2024	LW	Yannick Bolasie (COD)	Free agent	Released	

=== Loaned in ===
Date	Pos	Player	Loaned from	Until	Ref.
31 July 2023	GK	Carl Rushworth (ENG)	Brighton & Hove Albion (ENG)	End of season	
4 August 2023	RB	Harrison Ashby (SCO)	Newcastle United (ENG)	End of season	
11 August 2023	CM	Charlie Patino (ENG)	Arsenal (ENG)	End of season	
1 September 2023	CB	Bashir Humphreys (ENG)	Chelsea (ENG)	End of season	
1 September 2023	RW	Jamal Lowe (JAM)	Bournemouth (ENG)	End of season	
7 September 2023	LW	Kristian Fletcher (USA) †	D.C. United (USA)	1 January 2024	
1 February 2024	LW	Charles Sagoe Jr. (ENG)	Arsenal (ENG)	End of season	

† Signed initially for the Under-21s

=== Loaned out ===
Date	Pos	Player	Transferred to	Until	Ref.
2 August 2023	CF	Josh Thomas (WAL)	Port Vale (ENG)	11 January 2024 (Note: On 11 January, Thomas was recalled from his loan spell at Port Vale.)	
28 August 2023	AM	Joel Cotterill (WAL)	Stockport County (ENG)	15 January 2024 (Note: On 15 January, Cotterill returned from his loan spell at Stockport.)	
31 August 2023	CB	Ben Blythe (ENG)	Barry Town United (WAL)	End of season	
1 September 2023	CB	Brandon Cooper (WAL)	Leyton Orient (ENG)	1 January 2024	
26 January 2024	LB	Nathanael Ogbeta (ENG)	Bolton Wanderers (ENG)	End of season	
1 February 2024	CB	Harry Jones (WAL)	Weymouth (ENG)	End of season	
1 February 2024	LB	Kristian Pedersen (DEN)	Sheffield Wednesday (ENG)	End of season	

== Statistics ==
As of 16 September 2023
Players with names in italics and marked * were on loan from another club for the whole of their season with Swansea City.

No.	Pos	Nat	Player	Total		Championship		FA Cup		EFL Cup	
No.	Pos	Nat	Player	Apps	Goals	Apps	Goals	Apps	Goals	Apps	Goals
2	DF	(England) ENG	Joshua Key	8	0	6+0	0	0+0	0	1+1	0
3	DF	(Denmark) DEN	Kristian Pedersen	1	0	1+0	0	0+0	0	0+0	0
4	MF	(Scotland) SCO	Jay Fulton	7	0	5+0	0	0+0	0	0+2	0
5	DF	(Wales) WAL	Ben Cabango	6	0	5+0	0	0+0	0	1+0	0
6	DF	(England) ENG	Harry Darling	8	1	5+1	1	0+0	0	2+0	0
7	MF	(Wales) WAL	Joe Allen	5	0	0+3	0	0+0	0	2+0	0
8	MF	(England) ENG	Matt Grimes	8	1	6+0	0	0+0	0	2+0	1
9	FW	(England) ENG	Jerry Yates	7	2	6+0	2	0+0	0	0+1	0
10	FW	(Jamaica) JAM	Jamal Lowe*	1	0	1+0	0	0+0	0	0+0	0
11	FW	(England) ENG	Josh Ginnelly	6	1	0+4	0	0+0	0	1+1	1
12	FW	(England) ENG	Jamie Paterson	6	1	1+3	0	0+0	0	0+2	1
14	DF	(England) ENG	Josh Tymon	1	0	1+0	0	0+0	0	0+0	0
18	MF	(England) ENG	Charlie Patino*	4	0	4+0	0	0+0	0	0+0	0
19	FW	(Ukraine) UKR	Mykola Kukharevych	5	0	0+3	0	0+0	0	0+2	0
20	FW	(Wales) WAL	Liam Cullen	8	1	2+4	1	0+0	0	2+0	0
22	GK	(England) ENG	Carl Rushworth*	8	0	6+0	0	0+0	0	2+0	0
23	DF	(England) ENG	Nathan Wood	7	1	6+0	1	0+0	0	1+0	0
26	DF	(England) ENG	Kyle Naughton	3	0	1+0	0	0+0	0	2+0	0
30	DF	(Scotland) SCO	Harrison Ashby	7	1	5+0	1	0+0	0	1+1	0
31	MF	(Wales) WAL	Ollie Cooper	6	0	2+2	0	0+0	0	2+0	0
47	MF	(Scotland) SCO	Azeem Abdulai	5	0	0+3	0	0+0	0	1+1	0
Players who left the club during the season:
17	FW	(Netherlands) NED	Joël Piroe	4	2	3+0	0	0+0	0	1+0	2

=== Goals record ===
As of 16 September 2023

Rank	No.	Nat.	Po.	Name	Championship	FA Cup	EFL Cup	Total
1	9	(England)	CF	Jerry Yates	2	0	0	2
1	~~17~~	(Netherlands)	CF	Joël Piroe	0	0	2	2
3	6	(England)	CB	Harry Darling	1	0	0	1
3	8	(England)	CM	Matt Grimes	0	0	1	1
3	11	(England)	LW	Josh Ginnelly	0	0	1	1
3	12	(England)	SS	Jamie Paterson	0	0	1	1
3	20	(Wales)	SS	Liam Cullen	1	0	0	1
3	23	(England)	CB	Nathan Wood	1	0	0	1
3	30	(England)	RB	Harrison Ashby	1	0	0	1
Total					6	0	5	11

=== Disciplinary record ===
As of 16 September 2023

Rank	No.	Nat.	Po.	Name	Championship			FA Cup			EFL Cup			Total		
Rank	No.	Nat.	Po.	Name	Yellow card	(yellow card) (yellow-red card)	Red card	Yellow card	(yellow card) (yellow-red card)	Red card	Yellow card	(yellow card) (yellow-red card)	Red card	Yellow card	(yellow card) (yellow-red card)	Red card
1	11	(England)	LW	Josh Ginnelly	1	0	0	0	0	0	1	0	0	2	0	0
1	12	(England)	SS	Jamie Paterson	2	0	0	0	0	0	0	0	0	2	0	0
1	23	(England)	CB	Nathan Wood	2	0	0	0	0	0	0	0	0	2	0	0
1	26	(England)	RB	Kyle Naughton	1	0	0	0	0	0	1	0	0	2	0	0
5	4	(England)	CM	Jay Fulton	1	0	0	0	0	0	0	0	0	1	0	0
5	5	(Wales)	CB	Ben Cabango	1	0	0	0	0	0	0	0	0	1	0	0
5	6	(England)	CB	Harry Darling	1	0	0	0	0	0	0	0	0	1	0	0
5	7	(Wales)	CM	Joe Allen	1	0	0	0	0	0	0	0	0	1	0	0
5	8	(England)	CM	Matt Grimes	1	0	0	0	0	0	0	0	0	1	0	0
5	31	(Wales)	AM	Ollie Cooper	1	0	0	0	0	0	0	0	0	1	0	0
5	47	(Scotland)	MF	Azeem Abdulai	0	0	0	0	0	0	1	0	0	1	0	0
Total					12	0	0	0	0	0	3	0	0	15	0	0

== Pre-season and friendlies ==
Michael Duff was named Swansea City's new head coach on 22 June. Additionally, there were changes at boardroom level, including the appointment of Andy Coleman as the club's new chairman.

Swansea began their pre-season preparations at a training camp in Alicante, Spain, after announcing pre-season friendlies against Oxford United, Reading and Bristol Rovers. They also hosted behind closed doors friendlies against Haverfordwest County, Brøndby, Swindon Town and Newport County.

Win Draw Loss Fixtures

8 July 2023 Friendly	Swansea City	2–0	Haverfordwest County	Upper Killay
14:00 BST		Report		Stadium: Fairwood Training Ground; Attendance: 0 (Behind closed doors)

11 July 2023 Friendly	Swansea City	0–0	Brøndby	Upper Killay
14:00 BST		Report		Stadium: Fairwood Training Ground; Attendance: 0 (Behind closed doors)

15 July 2023 Friendly	Swansea City	5–0	Swindon Town	Upper Killay
12:00 BST	Wood; Piroe; Thomas (x3)	Report		Stadium: Fairwood Training Ground; Attendance: 0 (Behind closed doors)

18 July 2023 Friendly	Swansea City	5–0	Newport County	Upper Killay
12:00 BST	Cabango; Key; Piroe; Thomas (x2)	Report		Stadium: Fairwood Training Ground; Attendance: 0 (Behind closed doors)

21 July 2023 Friendly	Oxford United	1–0	Swansea City	Littlemore
19:30 BST	Browne 6'	Report		Stadium: Kassam Stadium; Attendance: 3,206 (615 away); Referee: Dean Whitestone

25 July 2023 Friendly	Swansea City	0–2	Bristol Rovers	Landore
19:00 BST		Report	Brown 76'; Marquis 90'	Stadium: Swansea.com Stadium

29 July 2023 Friendly	Reading	0–4	Swansea City	Reading
15:00 BST		Report	Piroe 24', 49'; Yates 52'; Grimes 55'	Stadium: Select Car Leasing Stadium

== Competitions ==
=== Overall record ===
Competition	First match	Last match	Starting round	Final position	Record							
Competition	First match	Last match	Starting round	Final position	Pld	W	D	L	GF	GA	GD	Win %
Championship	5 August 2023	4 May 2024	Matchday 1	14th	46	15	12	19	59	65	−6	32.61
FA Cup	6 January 2024	25 January 2024	Third round	Fourth round	2	1	0	1	2	5	−3	50.00
EFL Cup	8 August 2023	29 August 2023	First round	Second round	2	1	0	1	5	3	+2	50.00
Total					50	17	12	21	66	73	−7	34.00

Source: Soccerway

=== Championship ===
==== League table ====
Pos	Team	Pld	W	D	L	GF	GA	GD	Pts
11	Bristol City	46	17	11	18	53	51	+2	62
12	Cardiff City	46	19	5	22	53	70	−17	62
13	Millwall	46	16	11	19	45	55	−10	59
14	Swansea City	46	15	12	19	59	65	−6	57
15	Watford	46	13	17	16	61	61	0	56
16	Sunderland	46	16	8	22	52	54	−2	56
17	Stoke City	46	15	11	20	49	60	−11	56

Source: EFL official website
Rules for classification: 1) Points; 2) Goal difference; 3) Number of goals scored; 4) Head-to-head results; 5) Wins; 6) Away goals; 7) Penalty points (sec 9.5); 8) Number of 12-point sending off offences; 9) Play-off (only if needed to determine promotion/relegation)

==== Results summary ====
Overall								Home						Away					
Pld	W	D	L	GF	GA	GD	Pts	W	D	L	GF	GA	GD	W	D	L	GF	GA	GD
46	15	12	19	59	65	−6	57	8	5	10	26	28	−2	7	7	9	33	37	−4

Source: Soccerway

==== Results by round ====
Round	1	2	3	4	5	6	7	8	9	10	11	12	13	14	15	16	17	18	19	20	21	22	23	24	25	26	27	28	29	30	31	32	33	34	35	36	37	38	39	40	41	42	43	44	45	46
Ground	H	A	H	A	H	A	A	H	A	H	A	H	H	A	H	A	H	A	H	A	A	H	H	A	A	H	A	H	A	H	A	H	H	A	H	A	A	H	A	H	A	H	H	A	A	H
Result	D	L	D	L	L	L	D	W	W	W	W	L	L	W	D	L	D	L	D	W	D	L	W	L	D	W	D	L	L	L	W	L	L	W	W	D	L	W	D	L	L	W	W	W	D	L
Position	15	18	18	20	22	22	22	21	19	15	12	17	19	13	14	17	17	18	18	16	17	18	16	17	17	16	15	16	17	17	16	17	18	17	15	15	15	15	15	15	15	15	14	14	13	14

Source: Soccerway
A = Away; H = Home; W = Win; D = Draw; L = Loss

==== Matches ====
On 22 June, the EFL Championship fixtures were released.

Win Draw Loss Fixtures

5 August 2023 1	Swansea City	1–1	Birmingham City	Landore
15:00 BST	Yates 76'	Report	Dembélé 45'	Stadium: Swansea.com Stadium; Attendance: 18,051; Referee: James Linington

12 August 2023 2	West Bromwich Albion	3–2	Swansea City	West Bromwich
15:00 BST	Ajayi (yellow card) 18'; Furlong (yellow card) 39'; Rushworth 50' (o.g.); Swift 64' (pen.); Chalobah (yellow card) 90+7'; Palmer (yellow card) 90+8'	Report	Cabango (yellow card) 49'; Cooper (yellow card) 57'; Darling (yellow card) 62' (goal) 74'; Wood (yellow card) 71' (goal) 80'	Stadium: Hawthorns; Attendance: 24,051; Referee: Sam Barrott

19 August 2023 3	Swansea City	1–1	Coventry City	Landore
15:00 BST	Yates 41'; Allen (yellow card) 88'; Grimes (yellow card) 90+3'	Report	Godden 39'; Latibeaudiere (yellow card) 58'	Stadium: Swansea.com Stadium; Attendance: 16,736; Referee: Bobby Madley

26 August 2023 4	Preston North End	2–1	Swansea City	Preston
15:00 BST	Ledson (yellow card) 11'; Browne (yellow card) 48'; Hughes 67'; Holmes 79'	Report	Ashby 33'; Wood (yellow card) 48'	Stadium: Deepdale; Attendance: 14,464; Referee: Josh Smith

2 September 2023 5	Swansea City	1–2	Bristol City	Landore
12:30 BST	Cullen 10'; Naughton (yellow card) 45+2'; Ginnelly (yellow card) 57'; Paterson (yellow card) 90'	Report	Naismith (yellow card) 45+3'; Sykes 48'; Bell 59'; Dickie (yellow card) 86'	Stadium: Swansea.com Stadium; Attendance: 16,676; Referee: Oliver Langford

15 September 2023 6	Cardiff City	2–0	Swansea City	Cardiff
19:45 BST	Tanner 71' (yellow card) 81'; Ramsey 86' (pen.)	Report	Fulton (yellow card) 57'	Stadium: Cardiff City Stadium; Attendance: 28,648; Referee: Sam Barrott

19 September 2023 7	Queens Park Rangers	1–1	Swansea City	White City
19:45 BST	Kakay (yellow card) 67'; Dykes 90+2'	Report	Wood (yellow card) 5'; Ginnelly 7'; Cooper (yellow card) 90+7' (yellow-red card) 90+8'	Stadium: Loftus Road Stadium; Referee: Andrew Kitchen

23 September 2023 8	Swansea City	3–0	Sheffield Wednesday	Landore
15:00 BST	Cullen (yellow card) 21'; Lowe 28' (pen.); Patino (yellow card) 45+6', (goal) 67'; Yates 64'	Report	Valentín (yellow card) 27'; Hendrick (yellow card) 39'	Stadium: Swansea.com Stadium; Attendance: 16,865; Referee: Anthony Backhouse

30 September 2023 9	Millwall	0–3	Swansea City	Bermondsey
15:00 BST	Cooper (yellow card) 22'; Longman (yellow card) 45+3'	Report	Lowe 23' (pen.); Grimes 57'; Rushworth (yellow card) 66'; Cabango (yellow card) 73'; Kukharevych 79'	Stadium: The Den; Attendance: 14,803; Referee: John Busby

4 October 2023 10	Swansea City	2–1	Norwich City	Landore
19:45 BST	Lowe 3' (yellow card) 48'; Key (yellow card) 52'; Cullen (yellow card) 55'; Cooper (yellow card) 76'; Humphreys 83'	Report	Gibson (yellow card) 18'; Sara 22'; Rowe (yellow card) 61'	Stadium: Swansea.com Stadium; Attendance: 14,512; Referee: Tom Nield

7 October 2023 11	Plymouth Argyle	1–3	Swansea City	Plymouth
15:00 BST	Cundle 18'; Whittaker (yellow card) 55'; Kesler-Hayden (yellow card) 79'	Report	Yates 56'; Cooper 68'; Key 90'	Stadium: Home Park; Attendance: 16,463; Referee: Lewis Smith

21 October 2023 12	Swansea City	1–3	Leicester City	Landore
15:00 BST	Cullen (yellow card) 14'; Grimes 20'; Darling (yellow card) 90+8'	Report	Vestergaard 44'; Justin (yellow card) 48'; Pereira (yellow card) 56'; Fatawu 63'; Iheanacho 87'; Dewsbury-Hall (yellow card) 90+8'	Stadium: Swansea.com Stadium; Attendance: 18,509; Referee: Anthony Backhouse

24 October 2023 13	Swansea City	0–1	Watford	Landore
19:45 BST		Report	Livermore (yellow card) 30'; Hoedt (yellow card) 73'; Sema 82'; Kayembe (yellow card) 86'	Stadium: Swansea.com Stadium; Attendance: 14,698; Referee: Andrew Kitchen

28 October 2023 14	Blackburn Rovers	0–1	Swansea City	Blackburn
15:00 BST	Carter (yellow card) 32'; Rankin-Costello (yellow card) 37'; Szmodics (yellow card) 60'; Wharton (yellow card) 63'; Moran (yellow card) 89'	Report	Cullen 28', (yellow card) 50'; Fulton (yellow card) 70'; Ashby (yellow card) 79'	Stadium: Ewood Park; Attendance: 13,102; Referee: Stephen Martin

4 November 2023 15	Swansea City	0–0	Sunderland	Landore
15:00 GMT	Patino (yellow card) 10' (yellow-red card) 30'; Lowe (penalty missed) 45+2'; Fulton (yellow card) 50'; Darling (yellow card) 80'	Report	Rusyn (yellow card) 20'; Ballard (yellow card) 52'; O'Nien (yellow card) 90+3'	Stadium: Swansea.com Stadium; Attendance: 16,974; Referee: Bobby Madley

11 November 2023 16	Ipswich Town	3–2	Swansea City	Ipswich
15:00 GMT	Taylor 17'; Chaplin 22' (yellow card) 26'; Hirst 53' (pen.); Scarlett (yellow card) 81'	Report	Fulton 7'; Cullen (yellow card) 26' (yellow-red card) 69'; Walsh (yellow card) 86'; Lowe 90+5'	Stadium: Portman Road; Attendance: 28,925; Referee: Sunny Gill

25 November 2023 17	Swansea City	2–2	Hull City	Landore
15:00 GMT	Paterson 17'; Yates 23'	Report	Jaden Philogene 48'; Greaves (yellow card) 60'; Morton 68'; Twine (yellow card) 89'	Stadium: Swansea.com Stadium; Attendance: 14,864; Referee: Dean Whitestone

29 November 2023 18	Leeds United	3–1	Swansea City	Leeds
19:45 GMT	Piroe 4'; Rutter 45+3'; James 61'	Report	Paterson 1'; Lowe (yellow card) 73'	Stadium: Elland Road; Attendance: 34,905; Referee: Sam Allison

2 December 2023 19	Swansea City	1–1	Huddersfield Town	Landore
15:00 GMT	Walsh (yellow card) 44'; Patino 90+4'	Report	Cabango 3' (o.g.); Thomas (yellow card) 86'; Kasumu (yellow card) 90+7'	Stadium: Swansea.com Stadium; Attendance: 14,725; Referee: Steve Martin

9 December 2023 20	Rotherham United	1–2	Swansea City	Rotherham
15:00 GMT				Stadium: AESSEAL New York Stadium

12 December 2023 21	Stoke City	1–1	Swansea City	Stoke-on-Trent
19:45 GMT	Laurent (yellow card) 38'; Gooch (yellow card) 42'; Johnson 70' (pen.); Pearson (yellow card) 82'	Report	Cabango (yellow card) 41'; Bolasie (yellow card) 84'; Darling 89'	Stadium: bet365 Stadium; Attendance: 18,555; Referee: David Webb

16 December 2023 22	Swansea City	1–2	Middlesbrough	Landore
15:00 GMT	Lowe 59'; Tymon (yellow card) 62'; Paterson (yellow card) 65'	Report	Greenwood 43'; Howson (yellow card) 64'; Jones (yellow card) 67'; Silvera 78'; Latte Lath (yellow card) 90+4'	Stadium: Swansea.com Stadium; Attendance: 15,084; Referee: James Bell

22 December 2023 23	Swansea City	2–1	Preston North End	Landore
19:45 GMT	Grimes (yellow card) 30'; Lowe (yellow card) 32'; Cabango (yellow card) 38'; Paterson (yellow card) 42', (goal) 60', 90+5'	Report	McCann (yellow card) 45+5'; Millar 67'; Holmes (yellow card) 74'	Stadium: Swansea.com Stadium; Attendance: 15,098; Referee: Robert Madley

26 December 2023 24	Southampton	5–0	Swansea City	Southampton
15:00 GMT	Aribo 17'; Edozie 48'; Fraser 74', 87'; Adams 90+3'	Report		Stadium: St Mary's Stadium; Attendance: 30,279; Referee: Keith Stroud

29 December 2023 25	Coventry City	2–2	Swansea City	Coventry
19:45 GMT	Wright 10'; Binks (yellow card) 26'; Simms 65'	Report	Walsh 7', (yellow card) 36'; Grimes (yellow card) 39'; Tymon (yellow card) 68'; Lowe (yellow card) 79'; Cullen 90+3'	Stadium: The Coventry Building Society Arena; Attendance: 25,807; Referee: Gavin Ward

1 January 2024 26	Swansea City	1–0	West Bromwich Albion	Landore
15:00 GMT	Cabango (yellow card) 18'; Tymon (yellow card) 49'; Cullen 55'	Report		Stadium: Swansea.com Stadium; Attendance: 16,797; Referee: Andy Davies

13 January 2024 27	Birmingham City	2–2	Swansea City	Bordesley
15:00 GMT	Šunjić (yellow card) 29'; Dembélé 38'; Stansfield (yellow card) 45+2'; Hogan (yellow card) 56'; Buchanan (yellow card) 83'; James (yellow card) 90+2', (goal) 90+5'	Report	Darling (yellow card) 36', (goal) 70'; Lowe 58'; Allen (yellow card) 76'	Stadium: St Andrew's Stadium; Attendance: 21,116; Referee: Matt Donohue

20 January 2024 28	Swansea City	1–3	Southampton	Landore
12:30 GMT	Paterson 40'; Fulton (yellow card) 45+2'; Darling (yellow card) 78'	Report	Adams 6'; Harwood-Bellis (yellow card) 17'; Smallbone 20'; Downes 45'; Charles (yellow card) 90+6'	Stadium: Swansea.com Stadium; Attendance: 17,356; Referee: Oliver Langford
Note: Fixture was originally scheduled for 15:00 kick-off, but was moved for TV coverage.

30 January 2024 29	Leicester City	3–1	Swansea City	Leicester
19:45 GMT	Dewsbury-Hall 3' (yellow card) 55'; Mavididi 69' (pen.); Akgün 72'	Report	Wood (yellow card) 68'; Allen 90+5'	Stadium: King Power Stadium; Attendance: 28,025; Referee: Keith Stroud
Note: Fixture was originally scheduled for 27 January, but was postponed due to both sides progression in the FA Cup.

3 February 2024 30	Swansea City	0–1	Plymouth Argyle	Landore
15:00 GMT	Cabango (yellow card) 22'; Cooper (yellow card) 71'	Report	Whittaker 18'; Hazard (yellow card) 71'; Gyabi (yellow card) 76'; Miller (yellow card) 82'	Stadium: Swansea.com Stadium; Attendance: 16,965; Referee: Sam Allison

10 February 2024 31	Hull City	0–1	Swansea City	Kingston upon Hull
15:00 GMT	Morton (yellow card) 27'	Report	Cullen 11'; Cabango (yellow card) 38'; Grimes (yellow card) 83'; Humphreys (yellow card) 87'	Stadium: MKM Stadium; Attendance: 21,017; Referee: Geoff Eltringham

13 February 2024 32	Swansea City	0–4	Leeds United	Landore
19:45 GMT	Wood (yellow card) 28'; Tymon (yellow card) 42'; Allen (yellow card) 68'	Report	Summerville 8'; Piroe 10', (yellow card) 65'; Gnonto 35', 72'	Stadium: Swansea.com Stadium; Attendance: 17,897; Referee: David Webb

17 February 2024 33	Swansea City	1–2	Ipswich Town	Landore
15:00 GMT	Yates 31'; Naughton (yellow card) 55'	Report	Broadhead 13'; Davis (yellow card) 30'; Chaplin 35'	Stadium: Swansea.com Stadium; Attendance: 16,647; Referee: John Busby

24 February 2024 34	Sunderland	1–2	Swansea City	Landore
15:00 GMT	Hume (yellow card) 49'; O'Nien 77'	Report	Ronald 19', 28'; Cabango (yellow card) 50'; Paterson (yellow card) 50'; Darling (yellow card) 90+2'; Tymon (yellow card) 90+4'	Stadium: Swansea.com Stadium; Attendance: 41,777; Referee: Keith Stroud

2 March 2024 35	Swansea City	2–1	Blackburn Rovers	Landore
15:00 GMT	Allen 7'; Paterson 19'; Tymon (yellow card) 72'	Report	McFadzean (yellow card) 15'; Dolan (yellow card) 34'; Szmodics 67'	Stadium: Swansea.com Stadium; Attendance: 15,369; Referee: Rebecca Welch

6 March 2024 36	Watford	1–1	Swansea City	Watford
19:45 GMT	Chakvetadze (yellow card) 45+1'; Livermore (yellow card) 45+3'; Porteous 57', (yellow card) 83'; Andrews (yellow card) 67'	Report	Andrews 18' (o.g.); Tymon (yellow card) 32'; Wood (yellow card) 36'	Stadium: Vicarage Road; Attendance: 16,440; Referee: Tom Nield

10 March 2024 37	Bristol City	1–0	Swansea City	Bristol
12:30 GMT	Sykes (yellow card) 71'; Dickie 73'; Wells (yellow card) 88'	Report	Tymon (yellow card) 63'	Stadium: Ashton Gate Stadium; Attendance: 20,995; Referee: Matt Donohue

16 March 2024 38	Swansea City	2–0	Cardiff City	Landore
12:30 GMT	Darling (yellow card) 17'; Allen (yellow card) 21'; Cullen 34'; Lowe 90+6'	Report	Méïté (yellow card) 17'	Stadium: Swansea.com Stadium; Attendance: 20,005; Referee: David Webb

29 March 2024 39	Sheffield Wednesday	1–1	Swansea City	Owlerton
15:00 BST	Cadamarteri 41'; Diaby (yellow card) 66'	Report	Yates (yellow card) 66'; Lowe 76'	Stadium: Hillsborough Stadium; Attendance: 28,301; Referee: Geoff Eltringham

1 April 2024 40	Swansea City	0–1	Queens Park Rangers	Landore
15:00 BST		Report	Cook 71'	Stadium: Swansea.com Stadium; Attendance: 19,704; Referee: Sam Allison

6 April 2024 41	Middlesbrough	2–0	Swansea City	Middlesbrough
15:00 BST	Latte Lath 45+1', 79'; Ayling (yellow card) 81'; Barlaser (yellow card) 84'	Report	Cooper (yellow card) 78'; Cullen (yellow card) 86'	Stadium: Riverside Stadium; Attendance: 24,780; Referee: Rebecca Welch

10 April 2024 42	Swansea City	3–0	Stoke City	Landore
20:00 BST	Cullen 19', (yellow card) 67'; Paterson (yellow card) 43'; Grimes 53'; Darling (yellow card) 61'; Key 73'	Report	Stevens (yellow card) 38'; Manhoef (yellow card) 61'; Thompson (yellow card) 90'	Stadium: Swansea.com Stadium; Attendance: 14,692; Referee: Keith Stroud
Note: Fixture was initially scheduled for a 19:45 kick-off, but was moved for live Sky Sports broadcast.

13 April 2024 43	Swansea City	1–0	Rotherham United	Landore
15:00 BST	Cooper (yellow card) 54'; Fulton (yellow card) 67'; Rinomhota 74' (o.g.); Grimes (yellow card) 87'	Report	Peltier (yellow card) 30'; Humphreys (yellow card) 34'	Stadium: Swansea.com Stadium; Attendance: 15,327; Referee: Leigh Doughty

21 April 2024 44	Huddersfield Town	0–4	Swansea City	Huddersfield
15:00 BST	Helik (yellow card) 55'; Thomas (yellow card) 90+8'	Report	Paterson (yellow card) 25'; Lowe 73'; Ronald 85'; Yates 90+1'; Walsh 90+8'	Stadium: Kirklees Stadium; Attendance: 18,935; Referee: John Busby

27 April 2024 45	Norwich City	2–2	Swansea City	Norwich
15:00 BST				Stadium: Carrow Road

4 May 2024 46	Swansea City	0–1	Millwall	Landore
12:30 BST				Stadium: Swansea.com Stadium; Attendance: 17,661

=== FA Cup ===
As a Championship side, Swansea entered the competition in the third round and were drawn at home to Morecambe. In the fourth round, they were drawn away to Bournemouth.

Win Draw Loss Fixtures

6 January 2024 Third round	Swansea City	2–0	Morecambe	Landore
17:30 GMT	Patino 47'; Wood (yellow card) 77'; Yates 87'	Report	Mayor (yellow card) 85'; Edwards (yellow card) 89'	Stadium: Swansea.com Stadium; Attendance: 7,670; Referee: Tom Nield

25 January 2024 Fourth round	Bournemouth	5–0	Swansea City	Kings Park
19:45 GMT	Kelly 7'; Scott 10' (yellow card) 79'; Sinisterra 14'; Brooks 35'; Solanke 44' (yellow card) 45'	Report	Wood (yellow card) 6'; Ashby (yellow card) 63'; Allen (yellow card) 66'; Fulton (yellow card) 76'	Stadium: Vitality Stadium; Referee: Darren England

=== EFL Cup ===
The Swans were drawn at home to Northampton Town in the first round and to Bournemouth in the second round.

Win Draw Loss Fixtures

8 August 2023 First round	Swansea City	3–0	Northampton Town	Landore
19:45 BST	Piroe 10', 53'; Ginnelly 90+4'	Report		Stadium: Swansea.com Stadium; Attendance: 6,923; Referee: Peter Wright

29 August 2023 Second round	Swansea City	2–3	Bournemouth	Landore
19:45 BST	Grimes 9' (pen.); Paterson 79'	Report	Brooks 55'; Traorè 68'; Christie 90+1'	Stadium: Swansea.com Stadium; Attendance: 8,785; Referee: Matt Donohue

=== Welsh League Cup ===
Swansea were drawn away against Carmarthen Town in the first round.

Win Draw Loss Fixtures

22 July 2023 First round	Carmarthen Town	0–4	Swansea City	Carmarthen
15:00 BST		Report	Morgan 30', 45'; Lloyd 33'; Nzingo 41'	Stadium: Richmond Park

5 August 2023 Second round	Swansea City	3–1	Caerau Ely	Briton Ferry
14:30 BST	Bates 7'; Wilson 28'; Morgan 54'	Report	Williams 69'	Stadium: Old Road

19 September 2023 Third round	Swansea City	1–1 (5–3 p)	Cardiff City	Swansea, Wales
19:30 BST	Cadogan 25'	Report	Evans 71'	Stadium: Swansea.com Stadium; Referee: Bryn Markham-Jones
	Penalties
	Congreve (penalty scored); Parker (penalty scored); Cadogan (penalty scored); Jenkins (penalty scored); Fletcher (penalty scored)		Crole (penalty scored); Johnson (penalty missed); Ashford (penalty scored); Giles (penalty scored)

23 October 2023 Quarter Final	Swansea City	6–0	Briton Ferry Llansawel (2)	Briton Ferry, Wales
19:45	Jenkins 7', 45+3'; Davies 40', 75'; Fletcher 78', 82'	Report		Stadium: Old Road Welfare Ground; Attendance: 1,028; Referee: Bryn Markham-Jones

3 January 2024 Semi Final	Swansea City	0–0 (5–4 p)	Cardiff Metropolitan University (1)
19:45		Report
