= Nathan Broome =

English footballer (born 2002)

Personal information
- Full name: Nathan Lee Broome
- Date of birth: 3 January 2002 (age 24)
- Place of birth: Warrington, England
- Height: 6 ft 2 in (1.88 m)
- Position: Goalkeeper

Team information
- Current team: Bolton Wanderers
- Number: 13

Youth career
- 2011–2018: Manchester City
- 2018–2019: Stoke City

Senior career*
Years	Team	Apps	(Gls)
2019–2022	Stoke City	0	(0)
2019–2020	→ Mickleover Sports (loan)	18	(0)
2022–2023	AFC Wimbledon	7	(0)
2023–2025	Swansea City	0	(0)
2025	→ Port Vale (loan)	0	(0)
2025–	Bolton Wanderers	0	(0)
2025–2026	→ Rochdale (loan)	4	(0)

International career
2019	England U17	1	(0)
2019	England U18	3	(0)
- * Club domestic league appearances and goals as of 21:21, 11 November 2025 (UTC)

Nathan Lee Broome (born 3 January 2002) is an English professional footballer who plays as a goalkeeper for EFL Championship club Bolton Wanderers.

Broome spent time in the academies of Manchester City and Stoke City. He played on loan at Mickleover Sports and was capped by England up to under-18 level. He signed with AFC Wimbledon in January 2022. He played 13 games in the 2022–23 season and then joined Swansea City in August 2023. He was loaned out to Port Vale for the second half of the 2024–25 season. He joined Rochdale on loan in November 2025.

== Career ==
=== Stoke City ===
Born in Warrington, Broome graduated from St Bede's College through Manchester City in 2018. He joined Manchester City at the age of nine. He left the club's Academy to join the Academy of Stoke City on a free transfer. He played 43 games for the Potters Under-18 and Under-23 teams, helping the Under-18s reach the final of the Premier League Cup in 2020. He faced competition from Tommy Simkin and Josef Bursik to become the club's third-choice goalkeeper. He spent the 2019–20 season on loan at Northern Premier League Premier Division club Mickleover Sports, playing 20 games, before picking up a shoulder injury the following campaign. He later said the loan "was the best time ever" and that he enjoyed "getting beat up every week by 40-year-old men coming to the end of their career smashing you".

=== AFC Wimbledon ===
Broome signed a two-and-a-half-year deal with AFC Wimbledon after joining on a free transfer on 31 January 2022. He had been signed after having impressed Dons goalkeeping coach Ashley Bayes on a week-long trial. Broome made his professional debut on 9 August 2022, in a 2–0 EFL Cup defeat to Gillingham at Plough Lane. He played as the club's goalkeeper in cup competitions until he sustained a minor foot injury. Will Jääskeläinen was signed as cover during his absence. Broome made his League Two debut on 28 March 2023, keeping a clean sheet in a 2–0 victory over Walsall. He then competed with Nik Tzanev for a first-team place for the rest of the 2022–23 season after Tzanev recovered from the injury that caused him to miss the Walsall game. His contract with Wimbledon was terminated by mutual consent on 21 August 2023 as manager Johnnie Jackson explained that Broome was "finding it difficult being away from home and he wanted a new challenge".

=== Swansea City ===
On 30 August 2023, Broome signed a three-year contract with Championship club Swansea City after having impressed head of goalkeeping Martyn Margetson whilst playing for England Under-17 and Under-18. He found himself unable to gain first-team action ahead of Lawrence Vigouroux and Andy Fisher, however.

On 14 January 2025, Broome joined League Two club Port Vale on loan for the remainder of the 2024–25 season as manager Darren Moore lost regular custodian Connor Ripley to paternity leave. He made his debut for the Valiants on 4 February, conceding four goals in a 4–1 defeat to Wrexham in an EFL Trophy match at Vale Park, though Moore blamed the defence for leaving him exposed. He remained on the bench for the remainder of the campaign as Vale secured automatic promotion. He left Swansea at the end of the season.

=== Bolton Wanderers ===
Broome had a trial with Bolton Wanderers in July 2025. He signed a three-year contract with the club later that month. On 29 November 2025, Broome joined National League club Rochdale on a short-term loan deal due to their other goalkeepers being injured. He played four matches, keeping two clean sheets, before returning to Bolton on 6 January.

== Style of play ==
Broome is noted for his agility as a goalkeeper who is good with the ball at his feet.

== Personal life ==
Broome is a Bolton Wanderers fan.

== Career statistics ==
As of match played 30 December 2025

Appearances and goals by club, season and competition
Club	Season	League			FA Cup		EFL Cup		Other		Total	
Club	Season	Division	Apps	Goals	Apps	Goals	Apps	Goals	Apps	Goals	Apps	Goals
Stoke City	2019–20	Championship	0	0	0	0	0	0	—		0	0
Mickleover Sports (loan)	2019–20	Northern Premier League; Premier Division	18	0	0	0	—		2 (Note: One appearances in FA Trophy and one appearance in Derbyshire Senior Cup)	0	20	0
AFC Wimbledon	2021–22	League One	0	0	—		—		—		0	0
AFC Wimbledon	2022–23	League Two	7	0	1	0	1	0	4 (Note: Appearance(s) in EFL Trophy)	0	13	0
AFC Wimbledon	Total		7	0	1	0	1	0	4	0	13	0
Swansea City	2023–24	Championship	0	0	0	0	0	0	—		0	0
Swansea City	2024–25	Championship	0	0	0	0	0	0	—		0	0
Swansea City	Total		0	0	0	0	0	0	0	0	0	0
Port Vale (loan)	2024–25	League Two	0	0	—		—		1	0	1	0
Bolton Wanderers	2025–26	League One	0	0	0	0	0	0	1	0	1	0
Bolton Wanderers	2026–27	Championship	0	0	0	0	0	0	—		0	0
Bolton Wanderers	Total		0	0	0	0	0	0	1	0	1	0
Rochdale (loan)	2025–26	National League	4	0	—		—		0	0	4	0
Career total			29	0	1	0	1	0	8	0	39	0

== Honours ==
Port Vale

- EFL League Two second-place promotion: 2024–25
