= 2022–23 Swansea City A.F.C. season =

Swansea City AFC
2022–23 season
- Owner: Jason Levien & Steven Kaplan (68%); Swansea City Supporters Trust (21.1%)
- Chairman: Julian Winter
- Head coach: Russell Martin
- Stadium: Swansea.com Stadium
- Championship: 10th
- FA Cup: Third round
- EFL Cup: First round
- Top goalscorer: League: Joël Piroe (19); All: Joël Piroe (20)
- Highest home attendance: 19,814 v Cardiff City 23 October 2022
- Lowest home attendance: 10,030 v Bristol City 17 January 2023
- Biggest win: 4–0 v Watford (Home), 29 December 2022
- Biggest defeat: 0–4 v Burnley (Away), 15 October 2022
Home colours	Away colours	Third colours

The 2022–23 season was the 111th season in the existence of Swansea City Association Football Club and the club's fifth consecutive season in the Championship. In addition to the domestic league, they also competed in the FA Cup and EFL Cup.

== Transfers ==
=== In ===
Date	Pos	Player	Transferred from	Fee	Ref.
18 June 2022	CB	Harry Darling (ENG)	Milton Keynes Dons (ENG)	Undisclosed	
28 June 2022	CB	Ben Blythe (ENG)	Doncaster Rovers (ENG)	Undisclosed	
1 July 2022	GK	Archie Matthews (ENG)	Birmingham City (ENG)	Free transfer	
1 July 2022	GK	Remy Mitchell (ENG)	Arsenal (ENG)	Free transfer	
1 July 2022 (Note: The transfer was announced on 10 June, and would become official on 1 July once the transfer window opened)	DF	Wasiri Williams (ENG)	Braintree Town (ENG)	Free transfer	
1 July 2022 (Note: The transfer was announced on 10 June, and would become official on 1 July once the transfer window opened)	CB	Nathan Wood (ENG)	Middlesbrough (ENG)	Undisclosed	
8 July 2022	MF	Joe Allen (WAL)	Stoke City (ENG)	Free transfer	
1 February 2023	LM	Liam Smith (SCO)	Manchester City (ENG)	Undisclosed	
17 February 2023	GK	Andreas Søndergaard (DEN)	Wolverhampton Wanderers (ENG)	Free transfer	

=== Out ===
Date	Pos	Player	Transferred to	Fee	Ref.
30 June 2022	CB	Ryan Bassett (WAL)	Carmarthen Town (WAL)	Released	
30 June 2022	CB	Scott Butler (WAL)	Wrexham (WAL)	Released	
30 June 2022	LW	Rio Campbell (ENG)	Wingate & Finchley (ENG)	Released	
30 June 2022	GK	Nicholas Defreitas-Hansen (DEN)	Atherton Collieries (ENG)	Released	
30 June 2022	AM	Yan Dhanda (ENG)	Ross County (SCO)	Released	
30 June 2022	CM	Josh Edwards (WAL)	Newport County (WAL)	Released	
30 June 2022	CB	Benjamin Erickson (WAL)	Aberystwyth Town (WAL)	Released	
30 June 2022	CB	Cameron Evans (WAL)	Sligo Rovers (IRE)	Released	
30 June 2022	GK	Tyler Evans (WAL)	Briton Ferry Llansawel (WAL)	Released	
30 June 2022	CF	Jaden Forrester (ENG)	Rushall Olympic (ENG)	Released	
30 June 2022	GK	Josh Gould (ENG)	Bath City (ENG)	Released	
30 June 2022	GK	Ben Hamer (ENG)	Watford (ENG)	Released	
30 June 2022	LW	Aaron Hillier (WAL)	Pontypridd United (WAL)	Released	
30 June 2022	LB	Jacob Jones (WAL)	Forest Green Rovers (ENG)	Released	
30 June 2022	AM	Dylan Morgan (ENG)	Taunton Town (ENG)	Released	
30 June 2022	CM	Dylan Perkins (WAL)	Briton Ferry Llansawel (WAL)	Released	
30 June 2022	GK	Jamie Searle (NZL)	Barnsley (ENG)	Released	
30 June 2022	CM	Korey Smith (ENG)	Derby County (ENG)	Released	
7 July 2022	CM	Flynn Downes (ENG)	West Ham United (ENG)	Undisclosed	
15 July 2022	LB	Cian Williams (WAL)	Cardiff Metropolitan University (WAL)	Free transfer	
1 September 2022	CB	Ryan Bennett (ENG)	Cambridge United (ENG)	Mutual consent	
5 January 2023	RW	Jordon Garrick (ENG)	Forest Green Rovers (ENG)	Undisclosed	

=== Loans in ===
Date from	Pos	Player	Loaned from	Date until	Ref.
24 June 2022	LB	Matthew Sorinola (ENG)	Union SG (BEL)	End of season	
29 August 2022	CM	Luke Cundle (ENG)	Wolverhampton Wanderers (ENG)	End of season	
30 August 2022	LW	Armstrong Oko-Flex (IRL)	West Ham United (ENG)	6 January 2023 (Note: On 6 January, Oko-Flex was recalled to West Ham)	
1 September 2022	RB	Fin Stevens (WAL)	Brentford (ENG)	1 January 2023 (Note: On 1 January, Stevens was recalled to Brentford)	

=== Loans out ===
Date from	Pos	Player	Loaned to	Date until	Ref.
20 July 2022	RW	Morgan Whittaker (ENG)	Plymouth Argyle (ENG)	3 January 2023 (Note: On 3 January, Whittaker was recalled from his loan at Plymouth)	
27 July 2022	GK	Lewis Webb (WAL)	Aberystwyth Town (WAL)	1 January 2023	
11 August 2022	RW	Jordon Garrick (ENG)	Lincoln City (ENG)	5 January 2023 (Note: On 5 January, Garrick was recalled from his loan at Lincoln and transferred to Forest Green)	
11 August 2022	CF	Kyle Joseph (SCO)	Oxford United (ENG)	End of season	
1 September 2022	CM	Daniel Williams (WAL)	The New Saints (WAL)	End of season	
3 January 2023	CB	Brandon Cooper (WAL)	Forest Green Rovers (ENG)	End of season	
13 January 2023	GK	Archie Matthews (ENG)	Oxford City (ENG)	End of season	
13 January 2023	LB	Nathanael Ogbeta (ENG)	Peterborough United (ENG)	End of season	
29 January 2023	CF	Michael Obafemi (IRL)	Burnley (ENG)	End of season	
3 February 2023	RW	Tarrelle Whittaker (ENG)	Wealdstone (ENG)	End of season	
21 February 2023	CB	Wasiri Williams (ENG)	Dundalk (IRL)	End of season	

== Pre-season and friendlies ==
On 13 May 2022, newly promoted EFL League One side Bristol Rovers revealed that a behind closed doors friendly away to Swansea was scheduled for 16 July. Swansea City then announced two pre-season friendlies against Plymouth Argyle and Charlton Athletic on 31 May.

Win Draw Loss Fixtures

1 July 2022 Friendly	Swansea City	7–0	Haverfordwest County	Upper Killay
TBA BST	Piroe x3 Cullen x2 Naughton; Paterson	Report		Stadium: Fairwood Training Ground; Attendance: 0 (behind-closed-doors)

5 July 2022 Friendly	Swansea City	0–2	Colchester United	Upper Killay
14:00 BST		Report	Hannant (?); Nouble (?)	Stadium: Fairwood Training Ground; Attendance: 0 (behind-closed-doors)

5 July 2022 Friendly	Swansea City	1–0	Colchester United	Upper Killay
15:30 BST	Latibeaudiere (?)	Report		Stadium: Fairwood Training Ground; Attendance: 0 (behind-closed-doors)

9 July 2022 Friendly	Swansea City	3–2	Forest Green Rovers	Upper Killay
13:00 BST	Obafemi 12'; Naughton 45'; Cullen (?)	Report	Brown (?); Little (?)	Stadium: Fairwood Training Ground; Attendance: 0 (behind-closed-doors)

12 July 2022 Friendly	Plymouth Argyle	1–1	Swansea City	Plymouth
19:30 BST	Hardie 89'	Report	Piroe 6'	Stadium: Home Park; Referee: Lee Swabey

16 July 2022 Friendly	Swansea City	3–2	Bristol Rovers	Upper Killay
13:00 BST	Piroe 8' (pen.); Congreve 10'; Cullen (?)	Report	Collins 14' (pen.); Loft (?)	Stadium: Fairwood Training Ground; Attendance: 0 (behind-closed-doors)

23 July 2022 Friendly	Charlton Athletic	1–2	Swansea City	Charlton
15:00 BST	Darling 4' (o.g.)	Report	Piroe 53'; Manning 85'	Stadium: The Valley; Attendance: 3,345

29 November 2022 Friendly	Heart of Midlothian	1–2	Swansea City	Edinburgh
TBA GMT	Henderson (?)	Report	Fulton 11'; Piroe 13'	Stadium: Tynecastle; Attendance: 0 (behind-closed-doors)

3 December 2022 Friendly	Dundee United	0–2	Swansea City	Dundee
12:00 GMT		Report	Paterson 44'; Manning 70'	Stadium: Tannadice

== Competitions ==
=== Overall record ===
Competition	First match	Last match	Starting round	Final position	Record							
Competition	First match	Last match	Starting round	Final position	Pld	W	D	L	GF	GA	GD	Win %
Championship	30 July 2022	8 May 2023	Matchday 1	10th	46	18	12	16	68	64	+4	39.13
FA Cup	8 January 2023	17 January 2023	Third round	Third round	2	0	1	1	2	3	−1	0.00
EFL Cup	9 August 2022		First round	First round	1	0	1	0	2	2	+0	0.00
Total					49	18	14	17	72	69	+3	36.73

Source: Soccerway

=== Championship ===
==== League table ====
Pos	Team	Pld	W	D	L	GF	GA	GD	Pts
7	Blackburn Rovers	46	20	9	17	52	54	−2	69
8	Millwall	46	19	11	16	57	50	+7	68
9	West Bromwich Albion	46	18	12	16	59	53	+6	66
10	Swansea City	46	18	12	16	68	64	+4	66
11	Watford	46	16	15	15	56	53	+3	63
12	Preston North End	46	17	12	17	45	59	−14	63
13	Norwich City	46	17	11	18	57	54	+3	62

Source: EFL Official Website
Rules for classification: 1) Points; 2) Goal difference; 3) Number of goals scored; 4) Head-to-head results; 5) Wins; 6) Away goals; 7) Penalty points (sec 9.5); 8) 12-point sending off offences

==== Results summary ====
Overall								Home						Away					
Pld	W	D	L	GF	GA	GD	Pts	W	D	L	GF	GA	GD	W	D	L	GF	GA	GD
46	18	12	16	68	64	+4	66	11	4	8	38	32	+6	7	8	8	30	32	−2

Source: Soccerway

==== Results by round ====
Round	1	2	3	4	5	6	7	8	9	10	11	12	13	14	15	16	17	18	19	20	21	22	23	24	25	26	27	28	29	30	31	32	33	34	35	36	37	38	39	40	41	42	43	44	45	46
Ground	A	H	A	H	H	A	A	H	H	H	A	A	H	A	H	H	A	A	H	A	A	H	A	A	H	H	A	A	H	A	H	A	H	H	A	H	A	H	A	H	A	H	H	A	A	H
Result	D	L	W	D	L	L	D	W	L	W	W	W	W	L	W	W	D	L	D	D	D	L	D	L	W	L	W	D	L	L	W	L	L	D	L	L	L	W	W	D	W	W	W	W	D	W
Position	9	22	13	14	20	22	21	17	22	16	11	6	6	8	7	4	6	8	9	8	8	10	10	16	12	15	11	12	13	15	12	12	12	15	17	17	17	16	15	15	14	13	13	12	10	10

Source: Soccerway
A = Away; H = Home; W = Win; D = Draw; L = Loss

==== Matches ====
Win Draw Loss Fixtures

On 23 June, the league fixtures were announced.

30 July 2022 1	Rotherham United	1–1	Swansea City	Rotherham
15:00 BST	Ogbene 16'	Report	Darling 38'	Stadium: AESSEAL New York Stadium; Attendance: 10,454; Referee: Matt Donohue

6 August 2022 2	Swansea City	0–3	Blackburn Rovers	Landore
15:00 BST		Report	Szmodics 39'; Brereton 57'; Travis 84'	Stadium: Swansea.com Stadium; Attendance: 16,632; Referee: Steve Martin

13 August 2022 3	Blackpool	0–1	Swansea City	Blackpool
15:00 BST	Lavery (yellow card) 47'; Yates (penalty missed) 50'	Report	Grimes (yellow card) 63'; Ntcham (yellow card) 77', (goal) 87'; Allen (yellow card) 90+3'	Stadium: Bloomfield Road; Attendance: 11,519; Referee: Andy Woolmer

16 August 2022 4	Swansea City	2–2	Millwall	Landore
19:45 BST	Manning 1', (yellow card) 73'; Obafemi 12', (yellow card) 90+1'	Report	Burey (yellow card) 39'; Mitchell (yellow card) 42'; Malone (yellow card) 65'; Cabango 90+3' (o.g.); Wood 90+5' (o.g.)	Stadium: Swansea.com Stadium; Attendance: 16,068; Referee: Gavin Ward

20 August 2022 5	Swansea City	0–2	Luton Town	Landore
15:00 BST	Obafemi (yellow card) 82'	Report	Campbell 14'; Morris 72'	Stadium: Swansea.com Stadium; Attendance: 16,323; Referee: John Busby

27 August 2022 6	Middlesbrough	2–1	Swansea City	Middlesbrough
15:00 BST	McGree 14'; Mowatt (yellow card) 27'; Crooks 30', (yellow card) 45'; Lenihan (yellow card) 78'; Roberts (yellow card) 84'; Jones (yellow card) 87'	Report	Cabango (yellow card) 74' (yellow-red card) 88'; Piroe 79' (pen.); Wood (yellow card) 80'; O. Cooper (yellow card) 90+2'	Stadium: Riverside Stadium; Attendance: 23,672; Referee: Bobby Madley

31 August 2022 7	Stoke City	1–1	Swansea City	Stoke-on-Trent
19:45 BST	Taylor (yellow card) 59'; Campbell 90+1'	Report	Piroe 6'; Sorinola (yellow card) 78'; Naughton (yellow card) 90'	Stadium: Bet365 Stadium; Attendance: 18,697; Referee: David Webb

3 September 2022 8	Swansea City	1–0	Queens Park Rangers	Landore
15:00 BST	Piroe (penalty missed) 16', 21', (yellow card) 77'; Grimes (yellow card) 34'; Paterson (yellow card) 39'	Report		Stadium: Swansea.com Stadium; Attendance: 15,935; Referee: Oliver Langford

10 September 2022	Birmingham City	Postponed	Swansea City	Bordesley
15:00 BST				Stadium: St Andrew's Stadium
Note: Fixture was postponed as a mark of respect following the passing of Queen Elizabeth II.

13 September 2022 9	Swansea City	0–1	Sheffield United	Landore
19:45 BST	Grimes (yellow card) 63'	Report	Ahmedhodžić (yellow card) 47'; Khadra 90+4'	Stadium: Swansea.com Stadium; Attendance: 15,458; Referee: Darren Bond

17 September 2022 10	Swansea City	3–0	Hull City	Landore
12:30 BST	Manning 61'; Cundle 64'; Wood (yellow card) 77'; Piroe 85'	Report	Slater (yellow card) 45+4'; Docherty (yellow card) 79'	Stadium: Swansea.com Stadium; Attendance: 15,207; Referee: Keith Stroud

1 October 2022 11	West Bromwich Albion	2–3	Swansea City	West Bromwich
15:00 BST	Furlong (yellow card) 43'; Pieters (yellow card) 47'; Livermore 48'; Rogic (yellow card) 53'; Diangana 65'	Report	Sorinola 6'; Manning (yellow card) 41'; Ntcham 71'; Obafemi 89'	Stadium: The Hawthorns; Attendance: 22,369; Referee: Graham Scott

5 October 2022 12	Watford	1–2	Swansea City	Watford
19:45 BST	Sarr 34'; Louza (yellow card) 90+12'	Report	Ntcham 52'; Grimes (yellow card) 67'; Cabango 90+8'; Darling (yellow card) 90+14'; Fulton (yellow card) 90+16'; Latibeaudiere (yellow card) 90+17'; Wood (yellow card) 90+18'	Stadium: Vicarage Road; Attendance: 17,231; Referee: Tim Robinson

8 October 2022 13	Swansea City	2–1	Sunderland	Landore
15:00 BST	O. Cooper 13'; Darling 45+1'; Fulton (yellow card) 54'; Latibeaudiere (yellow card) 90+4'	Report	Neil (yellow card) 16'; Evans (yellow card) 23'; Clarke 51' (yellow card) 90+7'; Embleton (yellow card) 54'; Gooch (yellow card) 90+7'	Stadium: Swansea.com Stadium; Attendance: 18,008; Referee: Gavin Ward

15 October 2022 14	Burnley	4–0	Swansea City	Burnley
15:00 BST	Vitinho 15'; Rodriguez 29' 57'; Zaroury 45+3'; Brownhill (yellow card) 61'	Report	Sorinola (yellow card) 23'; Cabango (yellow card) 34'; Fulton (yellow card) 38'; Latibeaudiere (yellow card) 40'; Piroe (red card) 74'	Stadium: Turf Moor; Attendance: 18,728; Referee: Steve Martin

18 October 2022 15	Swansea City	3–2	Reading	Landore
19:45 BST	Darling 41'; O. Cooper 60'; Latibeaudiere (yellow card) 65'; Fulton 74'	Report	Méïté 26'; Ince 33'; Yiadom (yellow card) 45'	Stadium: Swansea.com Stadium; Attendance: 15,717; Referee: James Bell

23 October 2022 16	Swansea City	2–0	Cardiff City	Landore
12:00 BST	Cooper 38'; Darling (yellow card) 50'; Obafemi (yellow card) 58' (goal) 67'; Cundle (yellow card) 60'	Report	Robinson (red card) 7'; O'Dowda (yellow card) 50'; Ralls (yellow card) 61'; Harris (yellow card) 90+1'	Stadium: Swansea.com Stadium; Attendance: 19,814; Referee: Darren Bond

29 October 2022 17	Bristol City	1–1	Swansea City	Ashton Gate
12:00 BST	Conway 24'; Pring (yellow card) 90+4'	Report	Ntcham 76'	Stadium: Ashton Gate; Attendance: 21,007; Referee: Andre Marriner

1 November 2022 18	Preston North End	1–0	Swansea City	Preston
19:45 GMT	Potts 30'; Ledson (yellow card) 55'; Storey (yellow card) 66'; Browne (yellow card) 73'; McCann (yellow card) 90'	Report	Cabango (yellow card) 11'; Grimes (yellow card) 70'; Oko-Flex (yellow card) 90+5'	Stadium: Deepdale; Attendance: 13,631; Referee: John Busby

5 November 2022 19	Swansea City	2–2	Wigan Athletic	Landore
15:00 GMT	Manning 44' (yellow card) 90+4'; Cooper (yellow card) 64'; Piroe 84' (pen.)	Report	Keane 8' (yellow card) 72'; Naylor 16'; Magennis (yellow card) 83'	Stadium: Swansea.com Stadium; Attendance: 16,644; Referee: Craig Pawson

8 November 2022 20	Birmingham City	2–2	Swansea City	Bordesley
19:45 GMT	Hogan 12'; Deeney (yellow card) 15' (goal) 89'; Bacuna (yellow card) 53'; Sanderson (yellow card) 90+4'	Report	Manning (yellow card) 15'; Ntcham 30'; Grimes 45+2'; Wood (yellow card) 48'; Darling (yellow card) 51'; Fulton (yellow card) 77'	Stadium: St. Andrew's Stadium; Attendance: 15,491; Referee: Andy Woolmer

12 November 2022 21	Huddersfield Town	0–0	Swansea City	Huddersfield
15:00 GMT	Mbete (yellow card) 59'	Report	Ntcham (yellow card) 41'; Oko-Flex (yellow card) 89'	Stadium: The John Smith's Stadium; Attendance: 17,852; Referee: Ben Toner

10 December 2022 22	Swansea City	0–1	Norwich City	Landore
15:00 GMT	Naughton (yellow card) 49'; Wood (yellow card) 90+4'	Report	Pukki 1'; Gibson (yellow card) 9'; Hayden (yellow card) 36'; Idah (yellow card) 84'; Giannoulis (yellow card) 86'; McLean (yellow card) 90+1'	Stadium: Swansea.com Stadium; Attendance: 16,362; Referee: Steve Martin

17 December 2022 23	Coventry City	3–3	Swansea City	Coventry
15:00 GMT	Panzo 29'; Allen 47'; Gyökeres 54'	Report	Wood (yellow card) 20'; Fulton (yellow card) 57', (goal) 76'; Piroe 68'; Cullen 84'	Stadium: Coventry Building Society Arena; Attendance: 17,985; Referee: Robert Jones

27 December 2022 24	Reading	2–1	Swansea City	Reading
17:15 GMT	Carroll 27'; Méïté (penalty missed) 32'; Holmes (yellow card) 40'; Ince 53'; Loum (yellow card) 77'	Report	Cooper (yellow card) 27'; Cabango (yellow card) 66'; Darling (yellow card) 66'; Cullen 71'	Stadium: Select Car Leasing Stadium; Attendance: 15,452; Referee: James Linington

29 December 2022 25	Swansea City	4–0	Watford	Landore
19:45 GMT	Grimes (yellow card) 9'; Darling (yellow card) 28'; Piroe 39', 78'; Fulton (yellow card) 60'; Latibeauduere (yellow card) 64', (goal) 87'; Cullen 74'	Report	Kalu (yellow card) 70'; Bachmann (yellow card) 71'	Stadium: Swansea.com Stadium; Attendance: 17,339; Referee: John Busby

2 January 2023 26	Swansea City	1–2	Burnley	Landore
15:00 GMT	Darling (yellow card) 12'; Cooper 27'; Allen (yellow card) 45+2'; Latibeaudiere (yellow card) 79'	Report	Maatsen 13', 22'; Brownhill (yellow card) 41'; Beyer (yellow card) 58'; Guðmundsson (yellow card) 79'; Benson (yellow card) 90+5'; Barnes (yellow card) 90+5'	Stadium: Swansea.com Stadium; Attendance: 17,699; Referee: Oliver Langford

14 January 2023 27	Sunderland	1–3	Swansea City	Sunderland
15:00 GMT	O'Nien (red card) 18'; Neil 64'; Hume (yellow card) 90+2'	Report	Cabango (yellow card) 19'; Piroe 50', (yellow card) 53'; Latibeaudiere (yellow card) 62'; Cullen 70'; Cooper 78'; Sorinola (yellow card) 88'	Stadium: Stadium of Light; Attendance: 41,030; Referee: Keith Stroud

21 January 2023 28	Queens Park Rangers	1–1	Swansea City	Shepherd's Bush
15:00 GMT	Lowe 27'	Report	Fulton 81'	Stadium: Loftus Road Stadium; Attendance: 16,110; Referee: John Busby

4 February 2023 29	Swansea City	3–4	Birmingham City	Landore
15:00 GMT	Fisher (yellow card) 13'; Piroe 23', 58'; Cullen 29'	Report	Hogan 14' (pen.); Chong 55'; Jutkiewicz 90'; Trusty 90+7'; Mejbri (yellow card) 90+8'; Bacuna (yellow card) 90+10'	Stadium: Swansea.com Stadium; Attendance: 17,247; Referee: Jeremy Simpson

11 February 2023 30	Sheffield United	3–0	Swansea City	Sheffield
15:00 GMT	Berge 21'; Robinson 45', (yellow card) 87'; McAtee (yellow card) 54'; McBurnie 89'	Report	Cabango (yellow card) 56'; Wood (yellow card) 81'; Fulton (yellow card) 88'	Stadium: Bramall Lane; Attendance: 27,800; Referee: Matt Donohue

15 February 2023 31	Swansea City	2–1	Blackpool	Landore
19:45 GMT	Sorinola 21'; Darling (yellow card) 49'; Connolly 73' (o.g.); Manning (yellow card) 81'	Report	Connolly (yellow card) 1'; Patino (yellow card) 39' (yellow-red card) 57'; Carey 70'	Stadium: Swansea.com Stadium; Attendance: 15,345; Referee: Geoff Eltringham

18 February 2023 32	Blackburn Rovers	1–0	Swansea City	Blackburn
15:00 GMT	Thomas (yellow card) 15'; Travis (yellow card) 45'; Ayala 89', (yellow card) 90+4'; Dolan (yellow card) 90+5'	Report	Latibeaudiere (yellow card) 51'; Fulton (yellow card) 88'	Stadium: Ewood Park; Attendance: 12,584; Referee: Thomas Bramall

21 February 2023 33	Swansea City	1–3	Stoke City	Landore
19:45 GMT	Whittaker 2'; Sorinola (yellow card) 27'; Grimes (yellow card) 45+2'; Cabango (yellow card) 46'; Manning (yellow card) 55'	Report	Laurent 15', 19'; Gayle (yellow card) 61'; Baker 90+3'	Stadium: Swansea.com Stadium; Attendance: 15,817; Referee: Andy Woolmer

27 February 2023 34	Swansea City	1–1	Rotherham United	Landore
20:00 GMT	Latibeaudiere (yellow card) 34'; Piroe 42'; Wood (yellow card) 71'; Cabango (yellow card) 81'	Report	Hugill (yellow card) 10'; Ogbene 52'; Hjelde (yellow card) 58'	Stadium: Swansea.com Stadium; Attendance: 15,144; Referee: Gavin Ward

5 March 2023 35	Luton Town	1–0	Swansea City	Luton
15:00 GMT	Morris 39'; Clark (yellow card) 49'; Woodrow (yellow card) 90+5'	Report	Cundle (yellow card) 28'; Cooper (yellow card) 47'	Stadium: Kenilworth Stadium; Attendance: 10,072; Referee: Dean Whitestone

11 March 2023 36	Swansea City	1–3	Middlesbrough	Swansea
15:00 GMT	Piroe 15'; Latibeaudiere (yellow card) 58'; Darling (yellow card) 73'; Fulton (yellow card) 82'	Report	Ramsey 54' (yellow card) 73'; Archer 57'; Akpom 77' (pen.)	Stadium: Swansea.com Stadium; Attendance: 17,021; Referee: Peter Bankes

14 March 2023 37	Millwall	2–1	Swansea City	Bermondsey
19:45 GMT	Cresswell 48'; McNamara (yellow card) 50'; Voglsammer 55'	Report	Darling (yellow card) 42'; Manning 58', (yellow card) 90+5'	Stadium: The Den; Attendance: 12,470; Referee: David Webb

19 March 2023 38	Swansea City	2–0	Bristol City	Swansea
12:30 GMT	Cullen 34'; Ntcham 77'; Manning (yellow card) 82'; Piroe (yellow card) 82'	Report	Wells (yellow card) 74'; Sykes (yellow card) 82'	Stadium: Swansea.com Stadium; Attendance: 16,730; Referee: Jeremy Simpson

1 April 2023 39	Cardiff City	2–3	Swansea City	Leckwith
15:00 BST	Philogene 35'; Rinomhota (yellow card) 58'; Kaba 83'; Kipré (yellow card) 90+7'	Report	Piroe 3', (yellow card) 90'; Cullen 33'; Manning (yellow card) 45+1'; Ntcham (yellow card) 50'; Fulton (yellow card) 55'; Cooper (yellow card) 57'; Cabango 90+9'	Stadium: Cardiff City Stadium; Attendance: 28,232; Referee: Keith Stroud

7 April 2023 40	Swansea City	0–0	Coventry City	Swansea
15:00 BST	Darling (yellow card) 36'; Wood (yellow card) 76'	Report	McFadzean (yellow card) 36'; Gyökeres (yellow card) 87'; Dabo (yellow card) 90+1'	Stadium: Swansea.com Stadium; Attendance: 19,960; Referee: John Busby

10 April 2023 41	Wigan Athletic	0–2	Swansea City	Wigan
15:00 BST	Lang (yellow card) 40'; Hughes (yellow card) 45+3'; Whatmough (yellow card) 90+1'	Report	Piroe 14', 34'; Manning (yellow card) 45+4'	Stadium: DW Stadium; Attendance: 11,634; Referee: Sam Allison

15 April 2023 42	Swansea City	1–0	Huddersfield Town	Landore
15:00 BST	Fulton (yellow card) 5'; Cabango (yellow card) 11'; Piroe (yellow card) 37'; Manning 69'; Fisher (yellow card) 90+5'	Report	Hogg (yellow card) 43'; Rudoni (yellow card) 90'	Stadium: Swansea.com Stadium; Attendance: 16,686; Referee: Matthew Donohue

19 April 2023 43	Swansea City	4–2	Preston North End	Landore
19:45 BST	Piroe 2', 90+4'; Allen 35', (red card) 90'; Darling 44', (yellow card) 90+9'; Cabango (yellow card) 45+1'; Latibeaudiere (yellow card) 82'	Report	Lindsay (yellow card) 30'; Hughes (yellow card) 44'; Cannon 48', (yellow card) 56'; Parrott 71'	Stadium: Swansea.com Stadium; Attendance: 15,433; Referee: Oliver Langford

22 April 2023 44	Norwich City	0–3	Swansea City	Norwich
15:00 BST	McCallum (red card) 42'; Gibbs (yellow card) 81'	Report	Latibeaudiere 23'; Cullen 39'; Ntcham 64'; Grimes (yellow card) 73'	Stadium: Carrow Road; Attendance: 26,135; Referee: David Webb

29 April 2023 45	Hull City	1–1	Swansea City	Kingston upon Hull
15:00 BST	Cabango 3' (o.g.)	Report	Cundle 39'; Manning (yellow card) 43'; Paterson (yellow card) 50'	Stadium: The MKM Stadium; Attendance: 23,036; Referee: Geoff Eltringham

8 May 2023 46	Swansea City	3–2	West Bromwich Albion	Swansea
15:00 BST	Cundle 26'; Ntcham 66'; Cooper (yellow card) 81'; Piroe 90+3'	Report	Yokuslu 13'; Ajayi 54'; Thomas-Asante (yellow card) 76'; Gardner-Hickman (yellow card) 85'	Stadium: Swansea.com Stadium; Attendance: 20,294 (2,000 away); Referee: Keith Stroud

=== FA Cup ===
The Swans were drawn away to Bristol City in the third round.

Win Draw Loss Fixtures

8 January 2023 Third round	Bristol City	1–1	Swansea City	Ashton Gate
12:30 GMT	Naismith (yellow card) 39'; Semenyo 75'; Pring (yellow card) 84'	Report	Piroe 15'; Allen (yellow card) 45+3'; Wood (yellow card) 62'; Darling (yellow card) 69'	Stadium: Ashton Gate; Attendance: 12,145; Referee: Craig Pawson

17 January 2023 Third round replay	Swansea City	1–2 (a.e.t.)	Bristol City	Landore
19:45 GMT	Cooper 73'; Wood (yellow card) 90+4'; Cundle (yellow card) 94'; Latibeaudiere (yellow card) 120+2'	Report	Sykes 62'; Pring (yellow card) 75'; Bell 112'; Semenyo (yellow card) 120+2'	Stadium: Swansea.com Stadium; Attendance: 10,030; Referee: Graham Scott

=== EFL Cup ===
Win Draw Loss Fixtures

The Swans were drawn away to Oxford United in the first round.

9 August 2022 First round	Oxford United	2–2 (5–3 p)	Swansea City	Littlemore
19:45 BST	McGinty (yellow card) 7'; Browne (yellow card) 65'; Rodríguez 72'; Brannagan 90+3'	Report	Fulton 8'; Cullen 25', (yellow card) 82'; Sorinola (yellow card) 76'	Stadium: The Kassam Stadium; Attendance: 4,373; Referee: Thomas Bramall
	Penalties
	Browne (penalty scored); Rodríguez (penalty scored); McGuane (penalty scored); Spasov (penalty scored); Brannagan (penalty scored)		(penalty scored) Cullen; (penalty scored) Ntcham; (penalty scored) Allen; (penalty missed) Sorinola

== Squad statistics ==
As of 8 May 2023
Players with names in italics and marked * were on loan from another club for the whole of their season with Swansea City.

No.	Pos	Nat	Player	Total		Championship		FA Cup		EFL Cup	
No.	Pos	Nat	Player	Apps	Goals	Apps	Goals	Apps	Goals	Apps	Goals
1	GK	(England) ENG	Andy Fisher	27	0	25+1	0	1+0	0	0+0	0
3	DF	(Republic of Ireland) IRL	Ryan Manning	46	5	41+2	5	1+1	0	1+0	0
4	MF	(Scotland) SCO	Jay Fulton	41	4	32+6	3	1+1	0	1+0	1
5	DF	(Wales) WAL	Ben Cabango	46	2	42+1	2	2+0	0	1+0	0
6	DF	(England) ENG	Harry Darling	33	4	26+5	4	0+1	0	1+0	0
7	DF	(Wales) WAL	Joe Allen	28	1	17+8	1	1+1	0	0+1	0
8	MF	(England) ENG	Matt Grimes	46	1	44+0	1	2+0	0	0+0	0
9	FW	(Republic of Ireland) IRL	Michael Obafemi	19	3	12+7	3	0+0	0	0+0	0
10	MF	(Cameroon) CMR	Olivier Ntcham	44	8	21+20	8	1+1	0	0+1	0
12	MF	(England) ENG	Jamie Paterson	23	0	9+14	0	0+0	0	0+0	0
13	GK	(Germany) GER	Steven Benda	23	0	21+0	0	1+0	0	1+0	0
14	FW	(Scotland) SCO	Kyle Joseph	0	0	0+0	0	0+0	0	0+0	0
15	DF	(England) ENG	Nathanael Ogbeta	1	0	0+0	0	0+0	0	1+0	0
16	DF	(Wales) WAL	Brandon Cooper	0	0	0+0	0	0+0	0	0+0	0
17	FW	(Netherlands) NED	Joël Piroe	45	20	43+0	19	2+0	1	0+0	0
18	MF	(England) ENG	Luke Cundle*	34	3	21+11	3	1+1	0	0+0	0
20	FW	(Wales) WAL	Liam Cullen	32	9	15+14	8	1+1	0	1+0	1
21	MF	(Republic of Ireland) IRL	Armstrong Oko-Flex*	13	0	1+12	0	0+0	0	0+0	0
22	DF	(Jamaica) JAM	Joel Latibeaudiere	37	2	30+4	2	2+0	0	1+0	0
23	DF	(England) ENG	Nathan Wood	43	0	40+0	0	2+0	0	0+1	0
24	DF	(Wales) WAL	Fin Stevens*	5	0	0+5	0	0+0	0	0+0	0
26	DF	(England) ENG	Kyle Naughton	26	0	16+9	0	1+0	0	0+0	0
28	MF	(England) ENG	Liam Walsh	7	0	4+3	0	0+0	0	0+0	0
29	DF	(England) ENG	Matthew Sorinola*	31	2	19+10	2	1+0	0	1+0	0
31	MF	(Wales) WAL	Ollie Cooper	44	6	24+17	5	1+1	1	1+0	0
37	MF	(Wales) WAL	Daniel Williams	0	0	0+0	0	0+0	0	0+0	0
41	MF	(Jamaica) JAM	Jordan Garrick	0	0	0+0	0	0+0	0	0+0	0
45	MF	(Wales) WAL	Cameron Congreve	13	0	1+9	0	1+1	0	1+0	0
Players out on loan:
19	FW	(England) ENG	Morgan Whittaker	15	1	2+13	1	0+0	0	0+0	0
