= Nathan Wood (footballer, born 2002) =

English association football player (born 2002)

- Wood with Southampton in 2025

Personal information
- Full name: Nathan Dean Joshua Wood-Gordon
- Date of birth: 31 May 2002 (age 24)
- Place of birth: Ingleby Barwick, England
- Height: 6 ft 2 in (1.88 m)
- Position: Centre-back

Team information
- Current team: Southampton
- Number: 15

Youth career
- TIBS
- –2015: Stockton Town
- 2015–2018: Middlesbrough

Senior career*
Years	Team	Apps	(Gls)
2018–2022	Middlesbrough	5	(0)
2021	→ Crewe Alexandra (loan)	12	(0)
2021	→ Hibernian (loan)	1	(0)
2022–2024	Swansea City	66	(1)
2024–	Southampton	53	(1)

International career^{‡}
2016–2017	England U15		
2017–2018	England U16	1	(0)
2018–2019	England U17	8	(0)
2019	England U18	9	(0)
2021–2022	England U20	5	(0)
2023–2024	England U21	4	(0)
- * Club domestic league appearances and goals as of 16:12, 19 September 2026 (UTC) ‡ National team caps and goals as of 22:08, 23 September 2024 (UTC)

Nathan Dean Joshua Wood-Gordon (born 31 May 2002), known as Nathan Wood, is an English professional footballer who plays as a centre-back for EFL Championship club Southampton.

Wood is a product of the Middlesbrough academy and made his professional debut for the club in August 2018. He had loan spells with Crewe Alexandra and Hibernian before joining Swansea City permanently in 2022. Wood moved to Southampton in July 2024. He has represented his country at youth levels.

== Early life ==
Wood is the son of former Crystal Palace and Middlesbrough player Dean Gordon. He came from an athletic background, having taken part in various sporting competitions throughout 2014 and 2015. Prior to joining the Middlesbrough academy squad in 2015, he played for TIBS and Stockton Town.

He attended Conyers School in Yarm, this led to him featuring in the twelfth episode in the first series of the CBBC educational documentary series Our School in 2014, during this time he was in year 7, his first year in secondary school.

== Club career ==
=== Middlesbrough ===
On 1 July 2018, Wood signed professional terms with Middlesbrough. He would become the club's youngest ever player to make a professional appearance, at 16 years and 72 days, replacing Daniel Ayala in an EFL Cup tie against Notts County on 14 August 2018.

On 1 February 2021, Wood joined League One side Crewe Alexandra on loan for the remainder of the 2020–21 season. He made his Crewe debut in a 2–1 defeat at Swindon Town on 20 February 2021.

On 31 August 2021, Wood moved north of the border to join Scottish Premiership club Hibernian on a season-long loan deal. On 16 October 2021, Wood made his debut for Hibernian, where he played the full game in a 3–0 loss against Dundee United. On 25 November 2021, it was announced that Wood had returned to parent club Middlesbrough for the remainder of his loan spell until January 2022, having only featured once for Hibs.

=== Swansea City ===
On 10 June 2022, Wood joined Swansea City on a two-year contract for an undisclosed fee. Wood's new manager Russell Martin was a long-term admirer and had previously tried to sign the defender when in charge of Milton Keynes Dons.

=== Southampton ===
On 5 July 2024, Wood joined Premier League club Southampton on a four-year contract for an undisclosed fee. He made his debut for the club on 28 August 2024 in a 5–3 away victory against Cardiff City in the EFL Cup. On 4 December 2024, Wood made his Premier League debut in a 5–1 home defeat against Chelsea.

He scored his first goal for the club on 20 December 2025 in a 1–1 draw with Coventry City.

== International career ==
Wood has represented England at U15, U16, U17 and U18 level.

On 6 September 2021, Wood made his debut for the England U20s during a 6–1 victory over Romania U20s at St. George's Park.

On 28 March 2023, Wood made his England U21 debut during a 2–1 defeat to Croatia at Craven Cottage.

== Style of play ==
Wood is known to be a pacey player and has previously played as a left-midfielder as a result of this. He recorded a 100m time of 13.07 seconds when he was aged 13.

== Career statistics ==
As of 19 September 2026

Club	Season	Division	League		National cup (Note: Includes FA Cup, Scottish Cup)		League cup (Note: Includes EFL Cup, Scottish League Cup)		Other		Total	
Club	Season	Division	Apps	Goals	Apps	Goals	Apps	Goals	Apps	Goals	Apps	Goals
Middlesbrough	2018–19	Championship	0	0	0	0	3	0	—		3	0
Middlesbrough	2019–20	Championship	1	0	0	0	1	0	—		2	0
Middlesbrough	2020–21	Championship	4	0	1	0	2	0	—		7	0
Middlesbrough	2021–22	Championship	0	0	1	0	1	0	—		2	0
Middlesbrough	Total		5	0	2	0	7	0	0	0	14	0
Crewe Alexandra (loan)	2020–21	League One	12	0	0	0	0	0	0	0	12	0
Hibernian (loan)	2021–22	Scottish Premiership	1	0	0	0	0	0	0	0	1	0
Swansea City	2022–23	Championship	40	0	2	0	1	0	—		43	0
Swansea City	2023–24	Championship	26	1	2	0	1	0	—		29	1
Swansea City	Total		66	1	4	0	2	0	0	0	72	1
Southampton	2024–25	Premier League	11	0	1	0	3	0	—		15	0
Southampton	2025–26	Championship	35	1	5	0	3	0	2 (Note: Appearances in Championship play-offs)	0	44	1
Southampton	2026–27	Championship	7	0	0	0	1	0	—		8	0
Southampton	Total		53	1	6	0	7	0	2	0	68	1
Career total			137	2	12	0	16	0	2	0	167	2
