= Joe Allen =

Welsh footballer (born 1990)

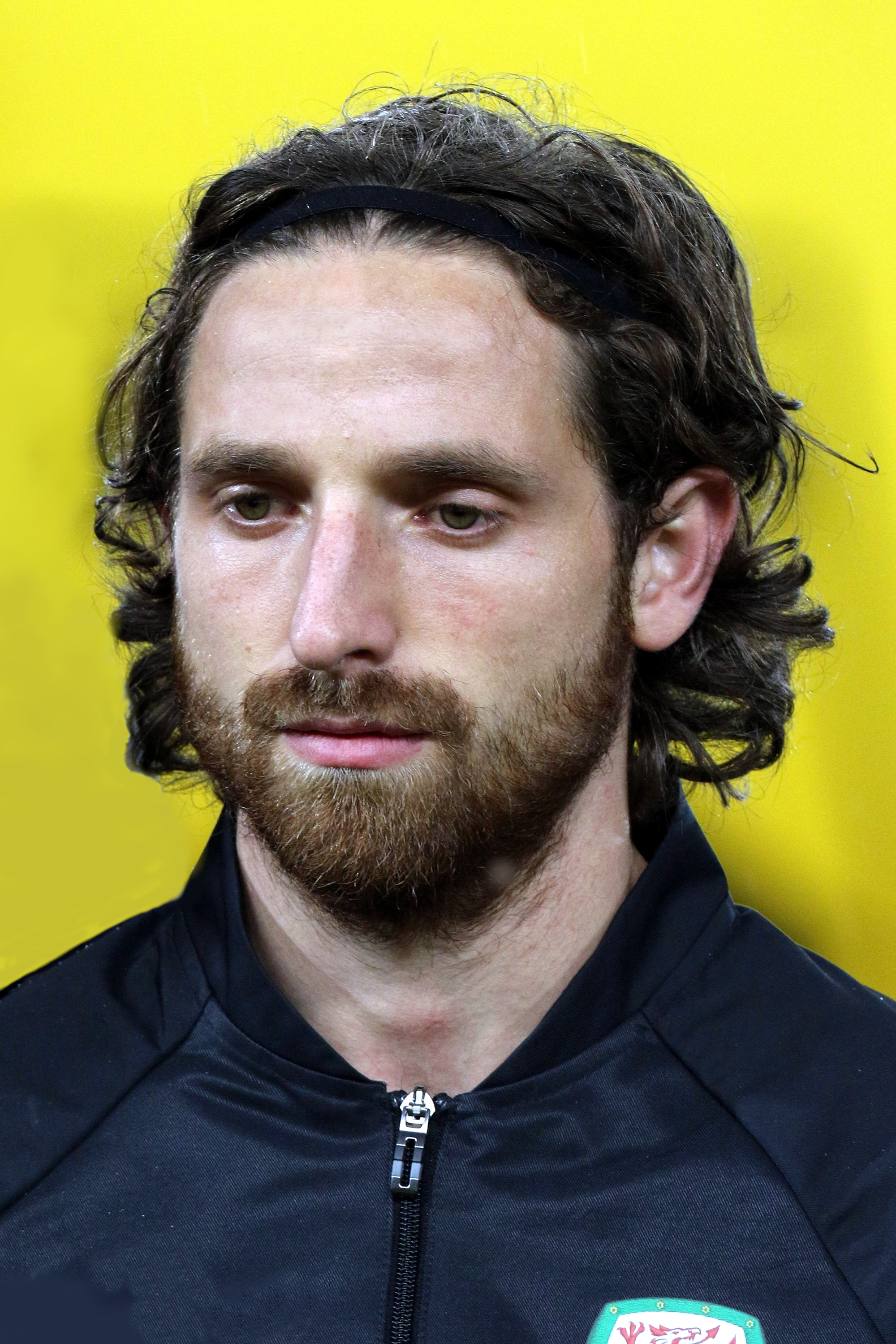
- Allen lining up for Wales in 2016

Personal information
- Full name: Joseph Michael Allen
- Date of birth: 14 March 1990 (age 36)
- Place of birth: Carmarthen, Wales
- Height: 5 ft 7 in (1.70 m)
- Position: Midfielder

Team information
- Current team: Swansea City (first-team coach)

Youth career
- 1997–2000: Tenby
- 2000–2007: Swansea City

Senior career*
Years	Team	Apps	(Gls)
2007–2012	Swansea City	127	(7)
2008	→ Wrexham (loan)	2	(1)
2012–2016	Liverpool	91	(4)
2016–2022	Stoke City	212	(18)
2022–2025	Swansea City	69	(4)
Total		501	(34)

International career
2005–2006	Wales U17	10	(1)
2006–2007	Wales U19	3	(0)
2007–2011	Wales U21	14	(2)
2009–2025	Wales	77	(2)
2012	Great Britain Olympic	5	(0)
Medal record
Men's football
Representing Wales (as player)
UEFA European Championship
Bronze medal – third place	2016 France
- * Club domestic league appearances and goals

Joseph Michael Allen (born 14 March 1990) is a Welsh professional football coach and former player who played as a midfielder. He is first-team coach at EFL Championship club Swansea City.

Allen began his playing career at Swansea, making his first-team debut in January 2007 at age 16. He played in 150 matches across all competitions in six years at the Liberty Stadium, also having a loan at Wrexham. During his time at Swansea, they won two promotions, going from League One to the Premier League. He also represented Great Britain at the 2012 Olympics. In the same year, he joined Liverpool for £15 million, signed by his former Swansea manager Brendan Rodgers. Allen spent four seasons at Anfield, making 132 appearances. In July 2016, he signed for Stoke City for a £13 million transfer fee. After making over 220 appearances for the Potters, he returned to Swansea in 2022.

A full international for Wales from 2009, Allen represented Wales at the UEFA European Championship in 2016 and 2020, helping the team reach the semi-finals of the former tournament. He also helped Wales qualify for the FIFA World Cup in 2022, the nation's first appearance at the competition since 1958.

== Early life ==
Born in Carmarthen, Allen was raised in the Pembrokeshire town of Narberth, and is a former student of Narberth Primary School and Ysgol y Preseli. He is a fluent Welsh language speaker. Allen started his career playing in local team Tenby up to age ten.

== Club career ==
=== Swansea City ===
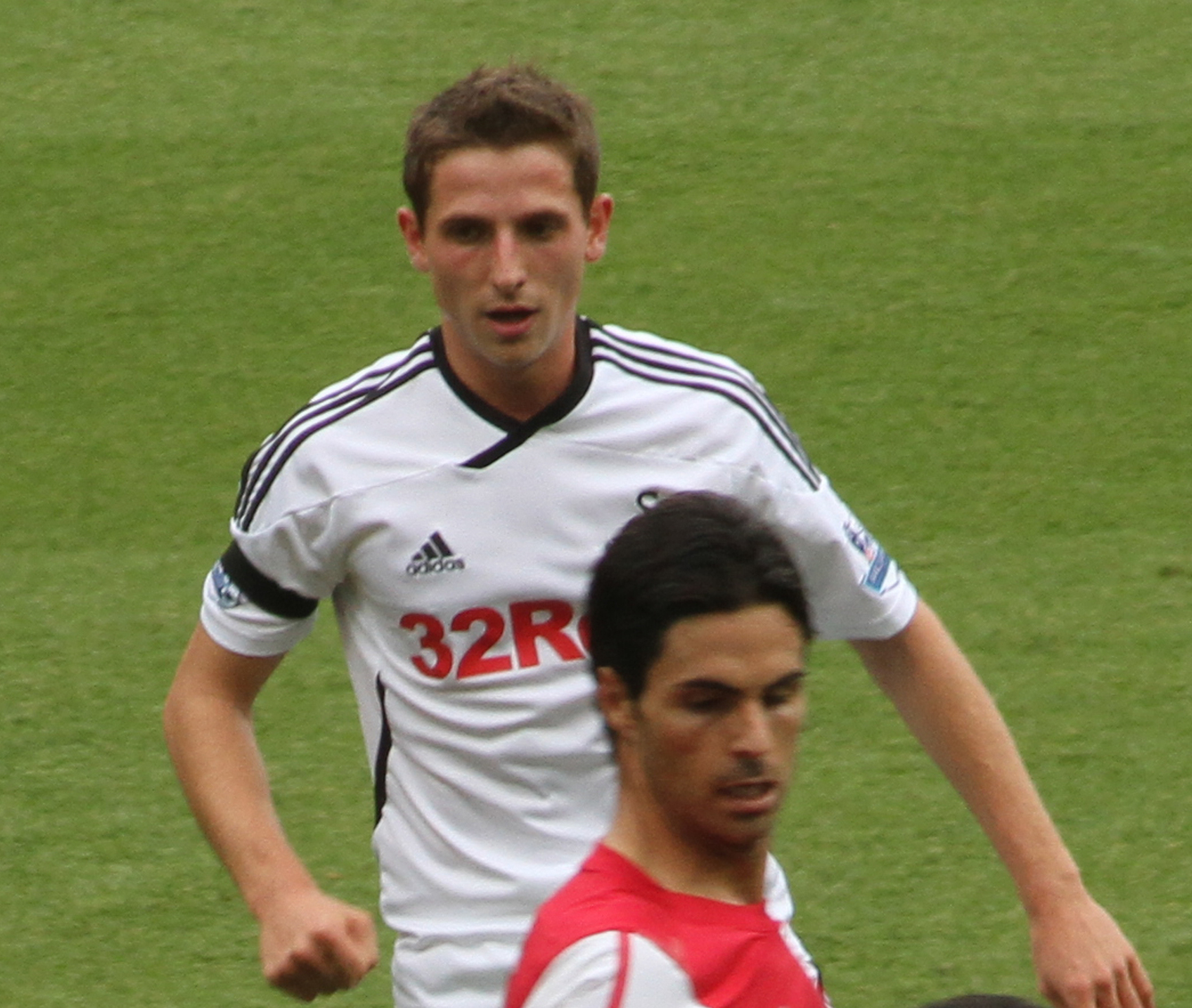
Allen playing for Swansea City in 2011

Allen was part of the Swansea City youth set-up from age nine. As a first-year scholar in the youth team in the 2006–07 season, he featured as an unused first-team substitute in a 3–0 away win over Premier League side Sheffield United in the third round of the FA Cup. Two weeks later, when Allen was just 16, Swansea manager Kenny Jackett gave him his debut in the FAW Premier Cup away tie to local Welsh Premier League side Port Talbot Town. He played the first half of the match as Swansea lost 2–1 after extra time. Allen made his league debut for Swansea as a 75th-minute substitute for Andy Robinson in a 6–3 home defeat to Blackpool on 7 May, the final day of the League One season, as Swansea missed out on a play-off position under new manager and former team captain Roberto Martínez.

Allen made a first start on 14 August 2007 in a 2–0 home win over Walsall in the first round of the League Cup. He was named man of the match for his performance, which included assisting in the first goal by providing a left-footed chipped cross to Paul Anderson. Two days later, Martínez awarded Allen his first professional contract, to keep him at Swansea until 2010. Allen started in the next round of the tournament at home to Reading and again received the man of the match award, despite a 1–0 loss. He made 14 appearances over the campaign, six in the Swans' victorious capture of the League One title.

The following season, Swansea's first in the Championship, Allen struggled to get into the first team due to competition from midfielders Darren Pratley, Ferrie Bodde, Owain Tudur Jones, Jordi Gómez, and Leon Britton. On 7 October, 2008, Allen joined Conference Premier club Wrexham on a one-month loan and scored a goal from 25 yards on his debut for the North Wales team the same day, in a 3–1 win over York City at the Racecourse Ground. His loan was curtailed after only one more match, when he damaged ankle ligaments and was sidelined for a month. Allen returned from the injury in December, entering the Swansea squad at home to Barnsley after regular midfielder Ferrie Bodde had been ruled out for the remainder of the season due to injury. With Swansea 2–0 down and playing poorly, manager Martínez was prompted to bring Allen on from the substitutes' bench. The club went on to earn a late 2–2 draw and despite only playing 25 minutes, Allen once more received the man of the match award. On 5 April, 2009, Allen came on as a 68th-minute substitute for Mark Gower, and 20 minutes later scored his first goal for Swansea in a South Wales derby 2–2 draw away at Cardiff City. At the end of the season, he signed a new three-year contract lasting until 2012.

After frequently being injured in the 2009–10 season, Allen returned to regular first-team football at the start of the 2010–11 season. A string of impressive performances prompted manager Brendan Rodgers to play Allen in the South Wales derby in November 2010, with Allen receiving the man of the match award in the 1–0 win. He played 40 league matches and scored twice over the Championship campaign, and featured for the full 90 minutes as Swansea won promotion with a 4–2 victory over Reading in the play-off final at Wembley Stadium. However, he scored an own goal in that match.

A few days prior to the beginning of the 2011–12 Premier League, Allen signed a new four-year contract with Swansea lasting until 2015. He played 36 out of 38 top-flight fixtures that season, scoring four goals. On 3 December, 2011, he was sent off for two bookings in a 4–2 loss to Blackburn Rovers at Ewood Park.

=== Liverpool ===
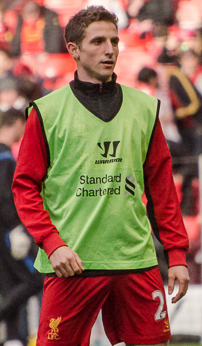
Allen warming up for Liverpool in 2012

On 10 August, 2012, after passing a medical at Melwood, Allen signed a long-term contract with Liverpool in a transfer deal worth £15 million, following Brendan Rodgers' move to Anfield. Allen made his Premier League debut on 18 August, 2012, starting in a 3–0 loss against West Bromwich Albion at The Hawthorns. He started Liverpool's next match of the league campaign against Manchester City, where he was voted man of the match on the club's official website by fans and journalists. He went on to win the Liverpool Player of the Month award for August 2012. Allen scored his first goal for Liverpool on 27 January, 2013, in a 3–2 defeat to Oldham Athletic in the fourth round of the FA Cup. He scored his first European goal on 21 February, in a 3–1 win over Zenit Saint Petersburg in the UEFA Europa League. On 20 March, it was announced Allen would be ruled out for the remainder of the 2012–13 season, with him requiring surgery on his left shoulder.

On 5 May 2014, Allen scored his first goal for Liverpool in the 2013–14 Premier League season with a header from a corner to give Liverpool the lead in a 3–3 draw against Crystal Palace at Selhurst Park. Allen played 26 times for Liverpool in 2013–14 as the side narrowly missed out on the Premier League title. In the 2014–15 season, Allen made 32 appearances as the side finished in sixth position. Allen was praised when he played the full 90 minutes in a 2–1 win against Manchester City, where he outplayed City star Yaya Touré. On 13 April, 2015, Allen scored the second goal in a 2–0 win over Newcastle United, his first at Anfield.

Before the start of the 2015–16 season, Allen suffered an injury during one of the pre-season matches and was ruled out for a month. On 13 January 2016, he scored a last-minute equalizer in a 3–3 home draw against league leaders Arsenal. Thirteen days later, he scored the winning penalty in a shootout against Stoke City to send Liverpool to the 2016 League Cup Final. Allen was an unused substitute for Liverpool as they lost the final on penalties to Manchester City. However, Allen did play in the 2016 UEFA Europa League Final against Sevilla on 18 May, 2016, in Basel, where despite initially taking the lead, Liverpool were defeated 3–1. At the end of the season, Allen expressed his desire to play regular football.

=== Stoke City ===
On 25 July 2016, Allen joined Stoke City on a five-year contract for a reported £13 million transfer fee. He made his Premier League debut for Stoke on 13 August 2016 in a 1–1 draw away at Middlesbrough. Speaking after his move to Stoke, Allen said he "had to move on" from Liverpool in order to receive regular playing time. He scored his first goal for Stoke on 24 September, 2016, in a 1–1 draw against West Bromwich Albion. Allen then scored against Manchester United on 2 October as Stoke earned their first point at Old Trafford since 1980. Allen continued his goal scoring run with both goals in a 2–0 win against Sunderland earning Stoke their first victory of the 2016–17 season. In November 2016, Allen was included in the 40-man shortlist for the UEFA Team of the Year. He scored a vital winning goal against Crystal Palace on 11 February, 2017. Allen made 39 appearances in 2016–17, scoring six goals, as Stoke finished in 13th position. Allen played 38 times in 2017–18, scoring four goals as Stoke suffered relegation to the Championship. Following relegation, Allen said he would be willing to stay with the club.

Allen signed new four-year contract with the Potters in June 2018. Allen was the only member of the squad to play every Championship game in 2018–19, as Stoke failed to mount a promotion challenge finishing in 16th. He scored six goals during the campaign most notably winning ones against Leeds United and his former club Swansea. Stoke began the 2019–20 season in poor form with Allen being sent-off against Bristol City on 14 September, 2019. Allen scored in Michael O'Neill's first match in a 4–2 win against Barnsley which lifted Stoke off the bottom of the table. Allen scored twice against Luton Town on 10 December, 2019, in a 3–0 victory but came in for criticism after he celebrated by cupping his ears at the crowd. Allen was ruled out for the remainder of the season after suffering an achilles tendon rupture on 7 March, 2020, playing against Hull City. In his absence Stoke managed to avoid relegation and finished in 15th position.

Allen returned to match fitness in December 2020, making his return from injury on Boxing day against Coventry City. He went on to play nineteen times in the 2020–21 season, before he suffered another injury set-back in March 2021 whilst on international duty with Wales. Prior to the start of the 2021–22 season, Allen was made captain by Michael O'Neill. Stoke had a frustrating season as after being in the top six for the first half of the campaign a poor second half saw them slip down the table and finish in 14th. Allen left Stoke at the end of the season following the expiration of his contract.

=== Return to Swansea City ===
On 8 July, 2022, Allen returned to his first club Swansea City, signing a two-year contract. Allen made his second debut in a 2–2 draw away to Oxford United in the Carabao Cup. He scored his first goal of the season in a 4–2 win over Preston North End on 19 April 2023. After being replaced in this game, Allen was then involved in an altercation with Preston manager Ryan Lowe, which saw both men sent off.

On 17 May, 2024, Allen agreed a further one-year contract with Swansea. On 4 January, 2024, Allen scored a stoppage time equaliser against West Bromwich Albion. It would be the final goal of his career. On 2 May, 2025, the club announced he would retire at the end of the 2024–25 season and his final game was a 3–3 draw to Oxford United, in which he was replaced by fellow departee, Kyle Naughton.

== International career ==
=== Wales ===
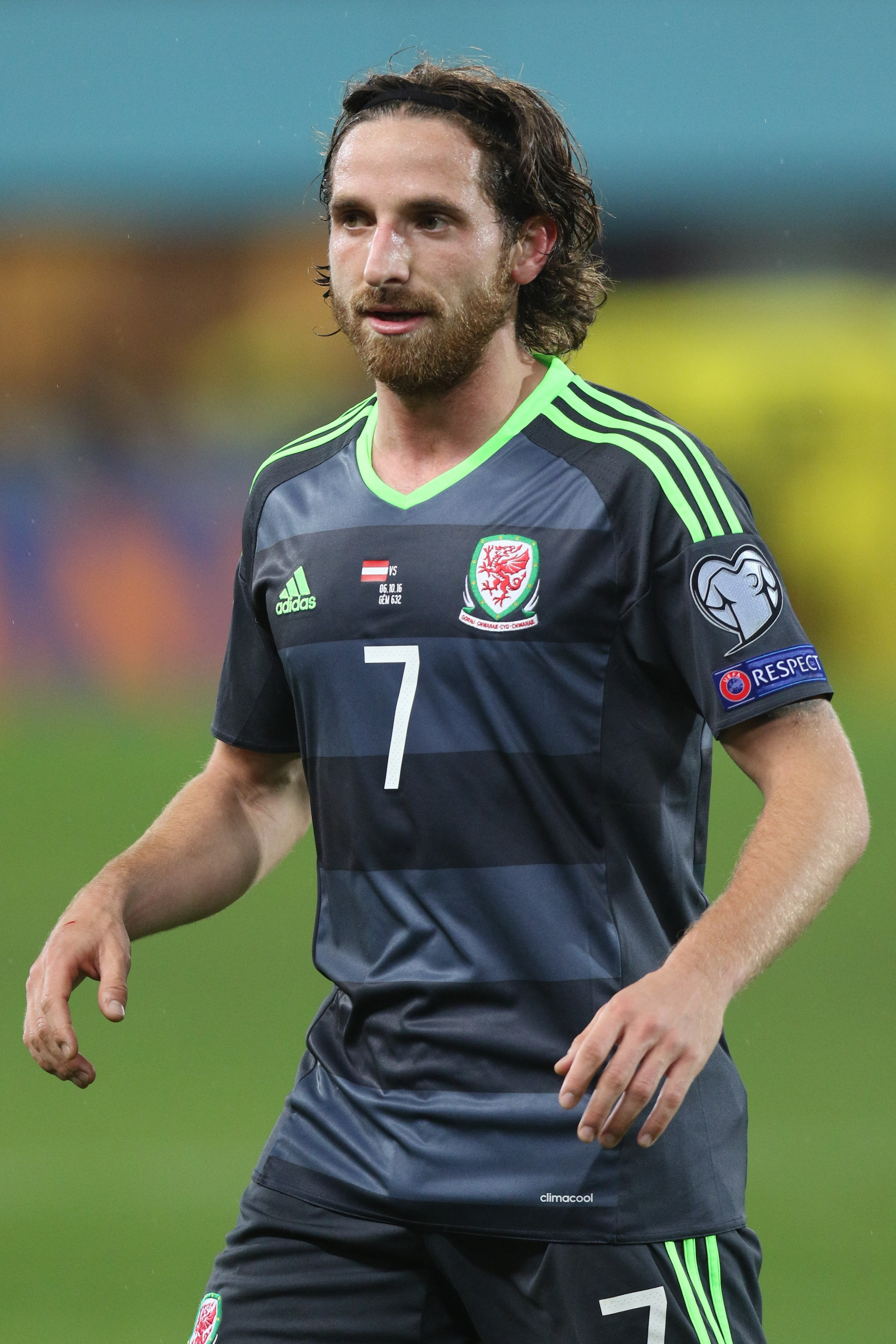
Allen playing for Wales in 2016

Soon after receiving his first professional contract for Swansea City in August 2007, Allen was called up for the Wales under-21 team in a friendly match away to Sweden. He scored the winning goal in a 4–3 victory.

In May 2009, Allen made his debut for the senior Wales team as an 80th-minute substitute for Jack Collison during a friendly against Estonia. Wales, who won 1–0 in Llanelli, were fielding their youngest team ever, with an average age of 21. He made his first start for Wales in a 2–0 UEFA Euro 2012 qualifying Group G match against Switzerland at his club's Liberty Stadium in October 2011. He was awarded the prize for the Wales' Player of the Year for 2012 in October of that year.

Allen captained Wales for the first time in the absence of Ashley Williams through injury on 4 June 2014 against the Netherlands. He played throughout the nation's successful qualification for UEFA Euro 2016. On 13 November, 2015, in a 3–2 home loss to the Dutch, he had a penalty saved by Jasper Cillessen, but Joe Ledley scored from the rebound.

At Euro 2016, Allen set-up Aaron Ramsey's goal in a 3–0 win over Russia on 20 June, which allowed Wales to top their group and advance to the knockout round of the tournament. Wales were eliminated following a 2–0 defeat to eventual champions Portugal in the semi-final on 6 July. Allen was named to the team of the tournament for his performances. In May, 2021, he was selected for the Wales squad for the delayed UEFA Euro 2020 tournament. In November, 2022, he was named in the Wales squad for the 2022 FIFA World Cup in Qatar.

On 7 February, 2023, Allen officially announced his retirement from international football with the Wales national team. In October 2024, Allen was recalled to the Wales national team squad by manager Craig Bellamy following injury to experienced Wales midfielders Aaron Ramsey and Ethan Ampadu.

== Style of play ==
Allen primarily played as a central midfielder and was deployed in a variety of midfield roles during his career. He was known for his passing, ball retention, and ability to link defence and attack. Former Swansea City and Liverpool manager Brendan Rodgers described Allen as the "Welsh Xavi" and the "Welsh Pirlo", citing his vision, composure in possession, passing ability, and influence on the tempo of play.

== Personal life ==
Allen is married to Lacey, with whom he has a son. Inspired by her involvement in animal welfare, he adopts hens to save them when they can no longer lay eggs. Allen's brother Harry lost his hearing at age three due to meningitis, and Joe became ambassador for Action on Hearing Loss Cymru in March 2015. Harry also played football and became captain of the Welsh deaf futsal team.

== Career statistics ==
=== Club ===
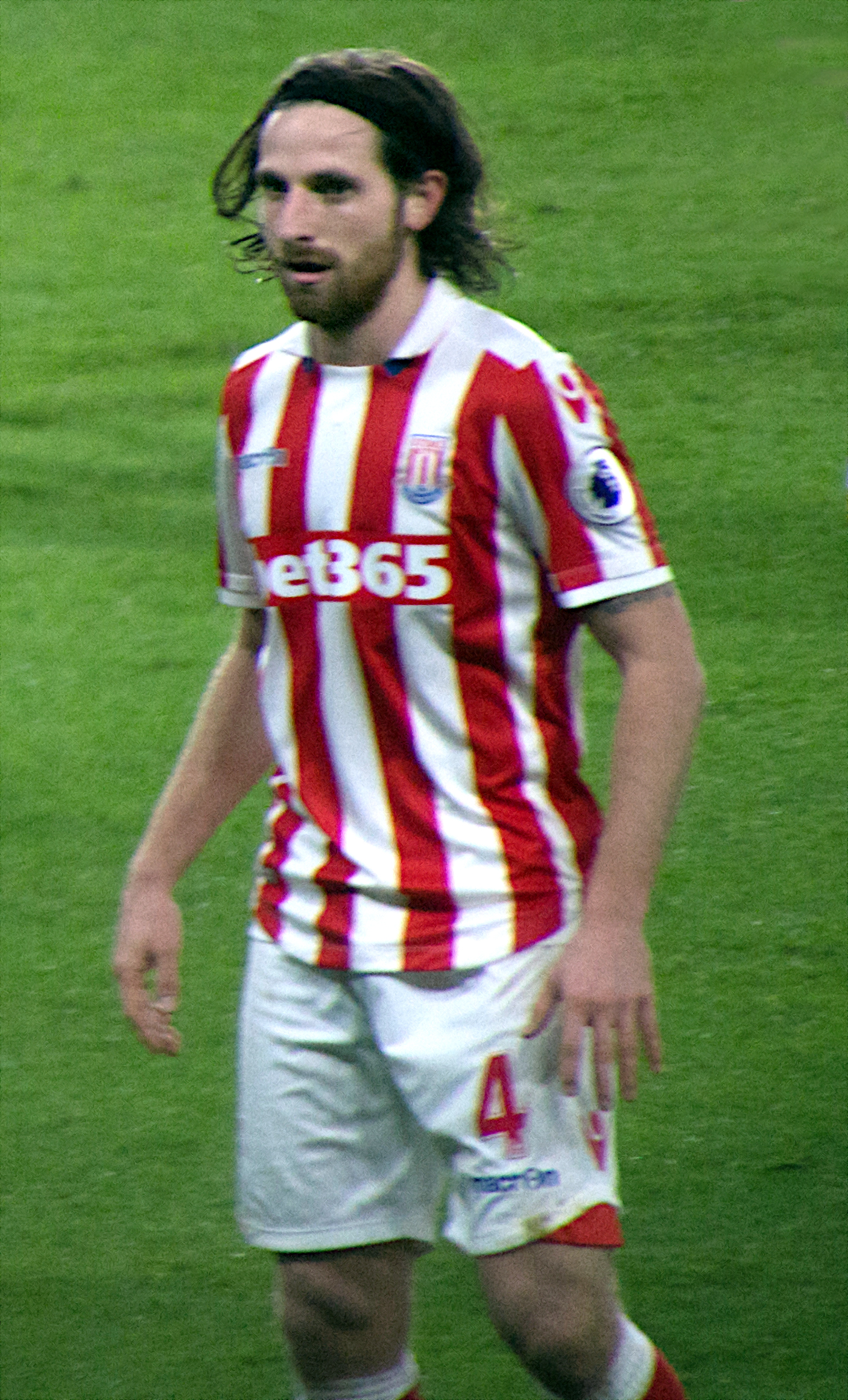
Allen playing for Stoke City in 2016

Appearances and goals by club, season and competition
Club	Season	League			FA Cup		League Cup		Europe		Other		Total	
Club	Season	Division	Apps	Goals	Apps	Goals	Apps	Goals	Apps	Goals	Apps	Goals	Apps	Goals
Swansea City	2006–07	League One	1	0	0	0	0	0	—		0	0	1	0
Swansea City	2007–08	League One	6	0	3	0	2	0	—		3 (Note: Appearances in Football League Trophy)	0	14	0
Swansea City	2008–09	Championship	23	1	2	0	1	0	—		—		26	1
Swansea City	2009–10	Championship	21	0	1	0	0	0	—		—		22	0
Swansea City	2010–11	Championship	40	2	2	0	3	0	—		3 (Note: Appearances in Championship play-offs)	0	48	2
Swansea City	2011–12	Premier League	36	4	2	0	1	0	—		—		39	4
Swansea City	Total		127	7	10	0	7	0	—		6	0	150	7
Wrexham (loan)	2008–09	Conference Premier	2	1	—		—		—		—		2	1
Liverpool	2012–13	Premier League	27	0	2	1	1	0	7 (Note: Appearances in UEFA Europa League)	1	—		37	2
Liverpool	2013–14	Premier League	24	1	1	0	1	0	—		—		26	1
Liverpool	2014–15	Premier League	21	1	5	0	0	0	6 (Note: Four appearances in UEFA Champions League, two appearances in UEFA Europa League)	0	—		32	1
Liverpool	2015–16	Premier League	19	2	2	1	5	0	11	0	—		37	3
Liverpool	Total		91	4	10	2	7	0	24	1	—		132	7
Stoke City	2016–17	Premier League	36	6	1	0	2	0	—		—		39	6
Stoke City	2017–18	Premier League	36	2	1	0	1	2	—		—		38	4
Stoke City	2018–19	Championship	46	6	0	0	0	0	—		—		46	6
Stoke City	2019–20	Championship	35	4	0	0	0	0	—		—		35	4
Stoke City	2020–21	Championship	18	0	1	0	0	0	—		—		19	0
Stoke City	2021–22	Championship	41	0	3	0	0	0	—		—		44	0
Stoke City	Total		212	18	6	0	3	2	—		—		221	20
Swansea City	2022–23	Championship	25	1	2	0	1	0	—		—		28	1
Swansea City	2023–24	Championship	19	2	2	0	2	0	—		—		23	2
Swansea City	2024–25	Championship	17	1	1	0	1	0	—		—		19	1
Swansea City	Total		69	4	5	0	4	0	—		—		78	4
Career total			501	34	31	2	21	2	24	1	6	0	583	39

=== International ===
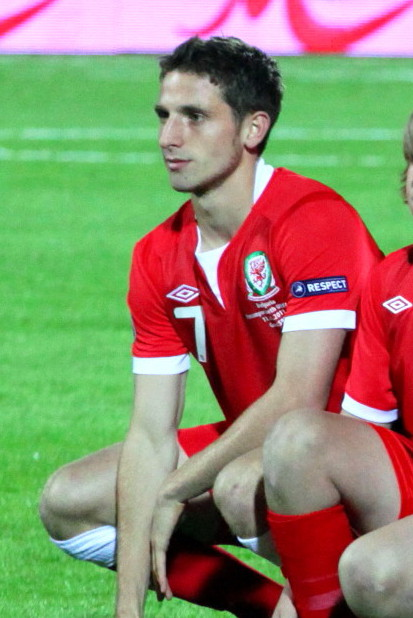
Allen with Wales in 2011

Appearances and goals by national team and year
National team	Year	Apps	Goals
Wales	2009	2	0
Wales	2010	0	0
Wales	2011	4	0
Wales	2012	6	0
Wales	2013	3	0
Wales	2014	4	0
Wales	2015	4	0
Wales	2016	11	2
Wales	2017	6	0
Wales	2018	8	0
Wales	2019	8	0
Wales	2020	0	0
Wales	2021	13	0
Wales	2022	5	0
Wales	2023	0	0
Wales	2024	2	0
Wales	2025	1	0
Total		77	2

Wales' score listed first, score column indicates score after each Allen goal

List of international goals scored by Joe Allen
No.	Date	Venue	Cap	Opponent	Score	Result	Competition
1	5 September 2016	Cardiff City Stadium, Cardiff, Wales	32	Moldova	2–0	4–0	2018 FIFA World Cup qualification
2	6 October 2016	Ernst-Happel-Stadion, Vienna, Austria	33	Austria	1–0	2–2	2018 FIFA World Cup qualification

== Honours ==
Swansea City

- Football League Championship play-offs: 2011

Liverpool

- Football League Cup runner-up: 2015–16
- UEFA Europa League runner-up: 2015–16

Individual

- UEFA European Championship Team of the Tournament: 2016
- Welsh Footballer of the Year: 2012
