= Ben Cabango =

Welsh footballer

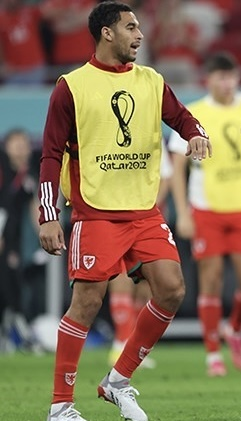
- Cabango with Wales at the 2022 FIFA World Cup

Personal information
- Full name: Benjamin George Cabango
- Date of birth: 30 May 2000 (age 26)
- Place of birth: Cardiff, Wales
- Height: 1.88 m (6 ft 2 in)
- Position: Defender

Team information
- Current team: Swansea City
- Number: 5

Youth career
- Newport County
- Swansea City

Senior career*
Years	Team	Apps	(Gls)
2018–	Swansea City	267	(11)
2018–2019	→ The New Saints (loan)	16	(0)

International career^{‡}
2017	Wales U17	1	(0)
2018–2019	Wales U19	10	(1)
2019	Wales U21	5	(0)
2020–	Wales	20	(0)
- * Club domestic league appearances and goals as of 18:18, 31 October 2026 (UTC) ‡ National team caps and goals as of 22:09, 17 November 2026 (UTC)

Benjamin George Cabango (born 30 May 2000) is a Welsh professional footballer who plays as a defender for EFL Championship club Swansea City, which he captains, and the Wales national team.

== Early life ==
Cabango was born in Cardiff to an Angolan father and a Welsh mother. He has a younger brother named Theo who plays rugby union for Cardiff. He attended Ysgol Gyfun Gymraeg Plasmawr, a Welsh language comprehensive school.

== Club career ==
Cabango began his career as a youth player with local amateur side Maindy Corries, where his father Paolo was a coach, before joining the youth academy at Newport County, where he played from under-13 to under-15 levels. He moved to the academy at Swansea City when he is 14, where he captained the under-19 side to win the FAW Welsh Youth Cup in 2018 and helped the under-23 side reach the final of the Premier League Cup.

In June 2018, Cabango signed his first professional deal with Swansea City, then signed for reigning Welsh Premier League champions The New Saints on a six-month loan deal. He made his senior debut for the side in a 5–0 defeat to Macedonian side KF Shkëndija in the first leg of the first qualifying round of the UEFA Champions League. In the return leg, Cabango scored his first senior goal as The New Saints won 4–0 but were eliminated on aggregate.

On 13 August 2019, he made his professional debut for Swansea in a 3–1 victory over Northampton Town in the first round of the League Cup. He made his league debut as a substitute against Huddersfield Town on 26 November 2019. In March 2020, he signed a new deal with Swansea until 2023.

On 8 July 2020, Cabango scored his first goal for Swansea City in a 3–1 win over Birmingham City. Following Joe Rodon's departure, Cabango became a regular starter, starting 34 games across the season including all 3 matches in the EFL Championship play-offs, as Swansea lost to Brentford in the final. In March 2021, he signed a new contract with Swansea until 2025.

In the 2021–22 season, Cabango was given the number 5 shirt. Cabango scored Swansea's second in a 4–0 victory over South Wales rivals and Cabango's hometown team, Cardiff City as Swansea became the first side to win both South Wales Derbies in a league season. Cabango repeated this feat in the following season, scoring a 99th minute winner in a 3–2 victory at the Cardiff City Stadium, marking a fourth consecutive Swansea City win in the derby.

In December 2024, Cabango signed a new contract with Swansea, until 2028. In January 2025, following an accepted bid for Matt Grimes, Cabango was named club captain.

== International career ==
Cabango made his senior Wales international debut as a second-half substitute during the team's UEFA Nations League League B match against Finland on 3 September 2020, which Wales won 1–0. In May 2021 he was selected for the Wales squad for the delayed UEFA Euro 2020 tournament. In November 2022 he was named in the Wales squad for the 2022 FIFA World Cup in Qatar.

== Personal life ==
Ben Cabango is the elder brother of professional rugby union player Theo Cabango.

== Career statistics ==
=== Club ===
As of match played 17 October 2026

Appearances and goals by club, season and competition
Club	Season	League			National cup (Note: Includes FA Cup, Welsh Cup)		League cup (Note: Includes EFL Cup, Welsh League Cup)		Other		Total	
Club	Season	Division	Apps	Goals	Apps	Goals	Apps	Goals	Apps	Goals	Apps	Goals
Swansea City	2018–19	Championship	0	0	0	0	0	0	—		0	0
Swansea City	2019–20	Championship	21	1	0	0	3	0	2 (Note: Appearance(s) in Championship play-offs)	0	26	1
Swansea City	2020–21	Championship	30	4	2	0	0	0	3	0	35	4
Swansea City	2021–22	Championship	37	1	0	0	2	1	—		39	2
Swansea City	2022–23	Championship	43	2	2	0	1	0	—		46	2
Swansea City	2023–24	Championship	35	0	0	0	1	0	—		36	0
Swansea City	2024–25	Championship	45	2	0	0	2	0	—		47	2
Swansea City	2025–26	Championship	45	1	1	0	1	0	—		47	1
Swansea City	2026–27	Championship	9	0	0	0	1	0	—		10	0
Swansea City	Total		265	11	5	0	11	1	5	0	286	12
The New Saints (loan)	2018–19	Welsh Premier League	16	0	0	0	3	0	6 (Note: Two appearances and one goal in UEFA Champions League, four appearances in UEFA Europa League)	1	25	1
Career total			257	11	5	0	13	1	11	1	286	13

=== International ===
As of match played 17 November 2026

Appearances and goals by national team and year
National team	Year	Apps	Goals
Wales	2020	2	0
Wales	2021	1	0
Wales	2022	2	0
Wales	2023	2	0
Wales	2024	5	0
Wales	2025	3	0
Wales	2026	5	0
Total		20	0
