= Cameron Congreve =

Welsh footballer (born 2004)

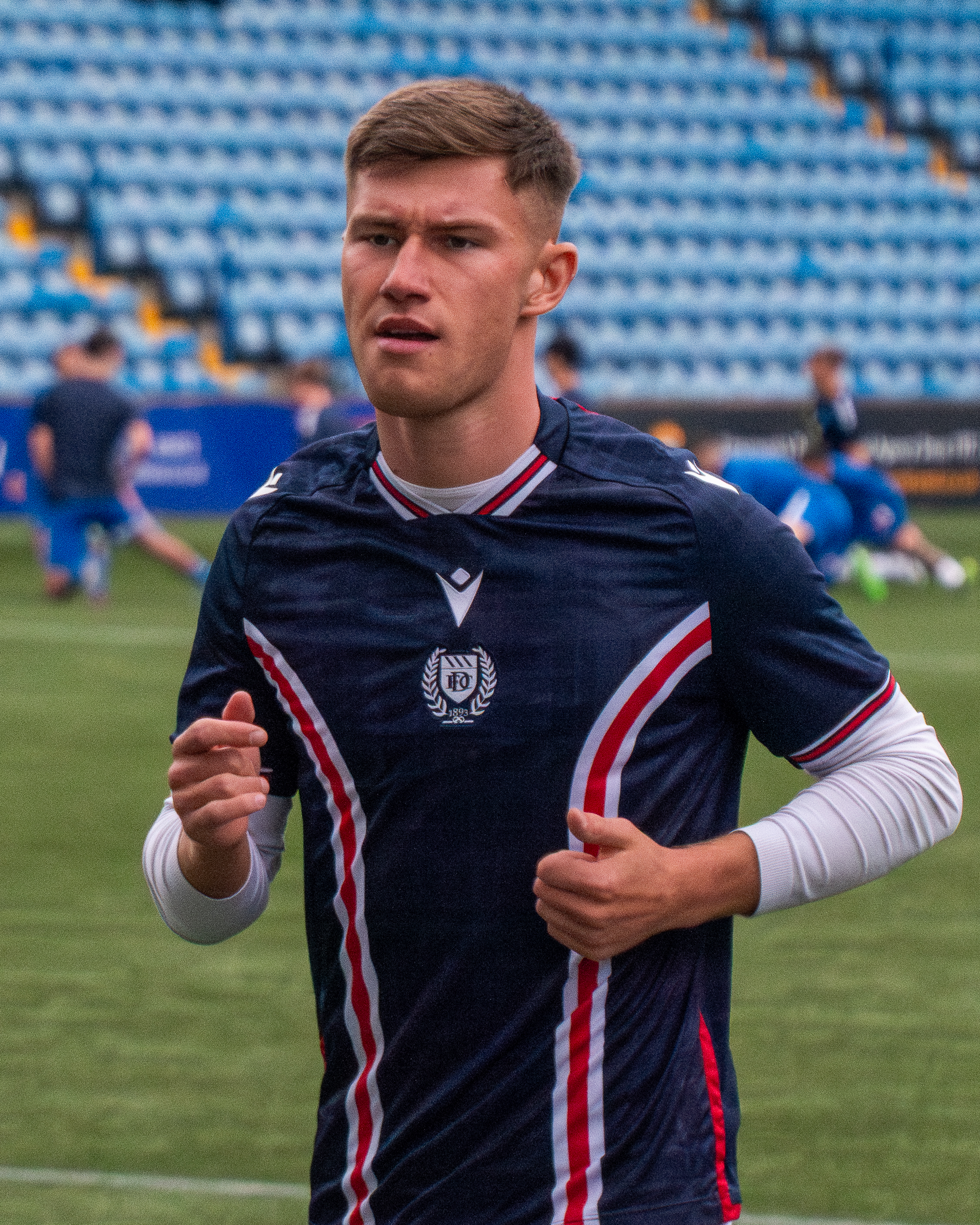
- Congreve warming up for Dundee in 2025

Personal information
- Full name: Cameron Mark Congreve
- Date of birth: 24 January 2004 (age 22)
- Place of birth: Blaenau Gwent, Wales
- Height: 1.80 m (5 ft 11 in)
- Positions: Attacking midfielder; right winger

Team information
- Current team: KVC Westerlo
- Number: 20

Youth career
- 2013–2022: Swansea City

Senior career*
Years	Team	Apps	(Gls)
2022–2026	Swansea City	15	(0)
2024–2025	→ Bromley (loan)	40	(5)
2025–2026	→ Dundee (loan)	34	(3)
2026–	KVC Westerlo	4	(0)

International career^{‡}
2019	Wales U15	1	(0)
2019	Wales U16	2	(1)
2021–2022	Wales U18	6	(4)
2022	Wales U19	3	(1)
2023–	Wales U21	13	(0)
2026–	Wales	2	(0)
- * Club domestic league appearances and goals as of 14:17, 6 September 2026 (UTC) ‡ National team caps and goals as of 19:16, 6 June 2026 (UTC)

Cameron Mark Congreve (born 24 January 2004) is a Welsh professional footballer who plays as an attacking midfielder or right winger for KVC Westerlo and the Wales national team.

== Career ==
Congreve is a youth product of Swansea City, having joined at U9 level. He was named the Swansea Academy Player of the Year for the 2020–21 season. He signed his first professional contract with Swansea City on 10 March 2022, keeping him at the club until at least 2024. He made his professional debut with Swansea in a 1–0 EFL Championship loss to Blackpool on 12 March 2022.

Congreve joined EFL League Two club Bromley on loan for the 2024–25 season. Congreve had a successful season with the Ravens which resulted in 47 appearances and 6 goals, with a personal highlight being his goal against Premier League club Newcastle United in an FA Cup match on 12 January 2025.

On 22 August 2025, Congreve joined Scottish Premiership club Dundee on a season-long loan. He made his debut the following day as a substitute in a league draw away to Kilmarnock. After impressing with an assist the previous week against Motherwell, Congreve received his first start for the Dee on 20 September at home to Livingston and provided two more assists en route to a man of the match performance and a first league win of the season for Dundee. On 13 December, Congreve scored first goal for Dundee in an away draw against Livingston.

On 3 August 2026, Congreve joined Belgian Pro League club KVC Westerlo on a four-year deal for an undisclosed fee.

== International career ==
Congreve is a youth international for Wales, having played for the Wales U18s, having debuted in a 0–0 (2–0) friendly loss to the England U18s on 30 March 2021. On 14 March 2023 he was called up to the Wales national under-21 football team. In May 2026 Congreve was called up to the Wales senior squad for the first time. He made his Wales debut in the 1-1 friendly match draw against Ghana on 2 June 2026.

== Career statistics ==
As of match played 5 September 2026

Appearances and goals by club, season and competition
Club	Season	League			National cup		League cup		Other		Total	
Club	Season	Division	Apps	Goals	Apps	Goals	Apps	Goals	Apps	Goals	Apps	Goals
Swansea	2021–22	EFL Championship	5	0	0	0	0	0	–		5	0
Swansea	2022–23	EFL Championship	10	0	2	0	1	0	–		13	0
Swansea	2023–24	EFL Championship	0	0	0	0	0	0	–		0	0
Swansea	2024–25	EFL Championship	0	0	0	0	0	0	–		0	0
Swansea	2025–26	EFL Championship	0	0	0	0	1	0	–		1	0
Swansea	Total		15	0	2	0	2	0	0	0	19	0
Bromley (loan)	2024–25	EFL League Two	40	5	3	1	1	0	3 (Note: Appearances in EFL Trophy)	0	47	6
Dundee (loan)	2025–26	Scottish Premiership	34	3	2	0	–		0	0	36	3
Westerlo	2026–27	Belgian Pro League	4	0	0	0	–		0	0	4	0
Career total			93	8	7	1	3	0	3	0	106	9

=== International ===
As of match played 6 June 2026

Appearances and goals by national team and year
National team	Year	Apps	Goals
Wales	2026	2	0
Total		2	0
