= Liam Cullen =

Welsh footballer

Personal information
- Full name: Liam Jamie Cullen
- Date of birth: 23 April 1999 (age 27)
- Place of birth: Kilgetty, Wales
- Height: 1.78 m (5 ft 10 in)
- Positions: Forward; attacking midfielder

Team information
- Current team: Leicester City
- Number: 11

Senior career*
Years	Team	Apps	(Gls)
2018–2026	Swansea City	187	(33)
2022	→ Lincoln City (loan)	20	(1)
2026–	Leicester City	10	(3)

International career^{‡}
2014–2016	Wales U17	9	(2)
2016–2017	Wales U19	5	(3)
2017	Wales U20	3	(0)
2018–2020	Wales U21	12	(1)
2023–	Wales	18	(2)
- * Club domestic league appearances and goals as of 16:31, 24 October 2026 (UTC) ‡ National team caps and goals as of 19:19, 14 November 2026 (UTC)

Liam Jamie Cullen (born 23 April 1999) is a Welsh professional footballer who plays as a forward or attacking midfielder for EFL League One club Leicester City and the Wales national team.

== Career ==
=== Early career and loans ===
Cullen joined the Swansea City academy at the age of 8, making his debut for the under-18 side at the age of 13. On 28 August 2018, he made his senior debut as a substitute in 1–0 loss to Crystal Palace in the EFL Cup. He scored his first goal for the club in a 4–1 win against Reading on 22 July 2020, a result which secured them a play-off spot. On 13 January 2022, he joined Lincoln City on loan for the remainder of the season. His first goal for Lincoln would come against Wycombe Wanderers on 12 February.

=== Return to Swansea ===
Following his loan at Lincoln, Cullen returned to Swansea and struggled for game time until scoring an 84th minute equaliser away to Coventry, with Swansea having trailed 3-0 at one point. Cullen scored in his next two matches and ended the season with 9 goals.

Following the departure of Joël Piroe in 2023, Cullen started 30 league games in the 2023-24 season, scoring 7 goals and getting 5 assists. In the 2024-25 season, Cullen was moved into a deeper role, typically playing as an attacking midfielder. Despite this, he finished as Swansea's top scorer with 12 goals.

=== Leicester City ===
On 31 July 2026, Cullen signed a 3-year contract with recently relegated EFL League One club Leicester City for an undisclosed fee.

== International career ==
Having previously played for Wales at under-17, under-19 and under-20 level, Cullen made his debut at under-21 on 12 October 2018, playing 62 minutes in a 2–0 loss to Romania.

In March 2023 he was called up to the Wales senior squad for the Euro 2024 qualifying matches against Croatia and Latvia. He made his senior debut for Wales on 11 October 2023 in the 4–0 friendly win against Gibraltar. He scored his first goals for Wales with a brace in a 4–1 home win over Iceland on 19 November 2024 in the UEFA Nations League.

== Career statistics ==
=== Club ===
As of match played 24 October 2026

Appearances and goals by club, season and competition
Club	Season	League			FA Cup		EFL Cup		Other		Total	
Club	Season	Division	Apps	Goals	Apps	Goals	Apps	Goals	Apps	Goals	Apps	Goals
Swansea City U23	2017–18	—			—		—		2 (Note: Appearance in EFL Trophy)	0	2	0
Swansea City U23	2018–19	—			—		—		3	0	3	0
Swansea City U23	Total		—		—		—		5	0	5	0
Swansea City	2018–19	Championship	0	0	0	0	1	0	—		1	0
Swansea City	2019–20	Championship	6	1	0	0	0	0	—		6	1
Swansea City	2020–21	Championship	13	1	2	2	0	0	1 (Note: Appearance in Championship play-offs)	0	16	3
Swansea City	2021–22	Championship	12	0	1	0	1	0	—		14	0
Swansea City	2022–23	Championship	29	8	2	0	1	1	—		32	9
Swansea City	2023–24	Championship	45	7	2	0	2	0	—		49	7
Swansea City	2024–25	Championship	42	11	1	0	2	1	—		45	12
Swansea City	2025–26	Championship	40	5	1	0	3	0	—		44	5
Total			187	33	9	2	10	2	1	0	207	37
Lincoln City (loan)	2021–22	League One	20	1	—		—		—		20	1
Leicester City	2026–27	League One	10	3	0	0	2	0	0	0	12	3
Career total			217	37	9	2	12	2	6	0	244	41

=== International ===
As of match played 14 November 2026

Appearances and goals by national team and year
National team	Year	Apps	Goals
Wales	2023	1	0
Wales	2024	6	2
Wales	2025	7	0
Wales	2026	4	0
Total		18	2

As of match played 19 November 2024
Wales score listed first, score column indicates score after each Cullen goal

List of international goals scored by Liam Cullen
No.	Date	Venue	Cap	Opponent	Score	Result	Competition	Ref.
1	19 November 2024	Cardiff City Stadium, Cardiff, Wales	7	Iceland	1–1	4–1	2024–25 UEFA Nations League B	
2	19 November 2024	Cardiff City Stadium, Cardiff, Wales	7	Iceland	2–1	4–1	2024–25 UEFA Nations League B	
