= Ollie Cooper =

Wales international footballer

Personal information
- Full name: Oliver Joseph Cooper
- Date of birth: 14 December 1999 (age 26)
- Place of birth: Derby, England
- Height: 1.76 m (5 ft 9 in)
- Position: Midfielder

Team information
- Current team: Notts County (on loan from Swansea City)
- Number: 8

Youth career
- 2011–2021: Swansea City

Senior career*
Years	Team	Apps	(Gls)
2021–	Swansea City	107	(7)
2021–2022	→ Newport County (loan)	33	(1)
2025–2026	→ Wigan Athletic (loan)	9	(1)
2026–	→ Notts County (loan)	8	(3)

International career^{‡}
2017	Wales U19	3	(0)
2019–2020	Wales U21	3	(0)
2023–	Wales	5	(0)
- * Club domestic league appearances and goals as of 14:18, 10 October 2026 (UTC) ‡ National team caps and goals as of 21:06, 14 October 2024 (UTC)

Oliver Joseph Cooper (born 14 December 1999) is a professional footballer who plays as a midfielder for Notts County on loan from EFL Championship club Swansea City, and the Wales national team.

== Career ==
=== Swansea City ===
Cooper joined the Swansea youth academy at under-12 level and signed his first professional contract with the club in February 2019. Cooper made his professional debut with Swansea in a 2–0 FA Cup win over Stevenage on 9 January 2021. He scored his first goal for Swansea on 23 January 2021 in a 5–1 win over Nottingham Forest in the FA Cup fourth round.

==== Newport County (loan) ====
On 31 August 2021, Cooper joined League Two side Newport County on a season-long loan deal, with the option of him returning to his parent club in January 2022. He made his debut for Newport the same day in the starting line-up for the 2–0 win against Plymouth Argyle in the EFL Trophy. Cooper scored his first goal for Newport on 2 October 2021 in the 3–0 League Two win against Scunthorpe United.

==== Wigan Athletic (loan) ====
On 1 September 2025 Cooper joined EFL League One club Wigan Athletic on loan for the remainder of the 2025–26 season. On 2 January 2026, he returned to his parent club.

== International career ==
Ollie Cooper is a former Wales Under-21 international. In November 2022 Cooper and Jordan James were named as travelling back-up players to the senior Wales squad for the 2022 World Cup in Qatar. Cooper made his senior Wales debut on 28 March 2023 as a second-half substitute for Aaron Ramsey in the Euro 2024 qualifying 1–0 win against Latvia.

== Personal life ==
Ollie Cooper is the son of the retired footballer, coach and manager Kevin Cooper. Cooper is engaged to S4C weather presenter Tanwen Cray, they have one child together called Neli. They took part in a reality tv series ("Tanwen & Ollie") showing reality of becoming young parents.

== Career statistics ==
As of 2 January 2026

Club statistics
Club	Season	League			FA Cup		League Cup		Other		Total	
Club	Season	Division	Apps	Goals	Apps	Goals	Apps	Goals	Apps	Goals	Apps	Goals
Swansea City U23s	2018–19	—N/a	—		—		—		3 (Note: Appearances in the EFL Trophy)	0	3	0
Swansea City	2020–21	Championship	3	0	2	1	0	0	—		5	1
Swansea City	2022–23	Championship	41	5	2	1	1	0	—		44	6
Swansea City	2023–24	Championship	34	1	2	0	2	0	—		38	1
Swansea City	2024–25	Championship	28	1	0	0	1	0	—		29	1
Swansea City	2025–26	Championship	0	0	0	0	1	0	—		1	0
Swansea City	Total		106	7	6	2	5	0	0	0	117	9
Newport County (loan)	2021–22	League Two	33	1	1	0	0	0	1	0	35	1
Wigan Athletic (loan)	2025–26	League One	9	1	2	0	1	0	1	0	13	1
Career totals			148	9	9	2	6	0	5	0	168	11
