= Ben Blythe =

English footballer

Personal information
- Full name: Benjamin Elliot Blythe
- Date of birth: 13 January 2002 (age 24)
- Place of birth: Leeds, England
- Position: Defender

Team information
- Current team: Leamington (dual-registration from Spalding United)

Youth career
- –2021: Doncaster Rovers

Senior career*
Years	Team	Apps	(Gls)
2021–2022	Doncaster Rovers	3	(0)
2021	→ Farsley Celtic (loan)	4	(0)
2022–2024	Swansea City	0	(0)
2023–2024	→ Barry Town United (loan)	22	(2)
2024–2025	Bradford (Park Avenue)	30	(2)
2025–	Spalding United	13	(0)
2026	→ Bourne Town (loan)		
2026–	→ Leamington (dual-registration)	2	(0)
- * Club domestic league appearances and goals as of 10:39, 28 February 2026 (UTC)

Benjamin Elliot Blythe (born 13 January 2002) is an English footballer who plays as a defender for Leamington, on dual-registration from Spalding United.

== Career ==
=== Doncaster Rovers ===
Born in Leeds, Blythe signed his first professional contract with Doncaster Rovers in July 2020. He made his senior debut as a substitute in a 4–1 League One defeat to Peterborough United on 9 May 2021. On 22 September 2021, he was sent out on a one-month loan to National League North side Farlsey Celtic. Following his return from loan, he made his first league start on 7 December 2021 at home to Oxford United, but was substituted at half-time as Doncaster lost 2–1.

=== Swansea City ===
In March 2022, it was announced that Blythe would join EFL Championship club Swansea City's under-23 side at the end of the season, having spent a month at the club on trial and that Blythe would continue to train with Swansea until the end of the season. Doncaster manager Gary McSheffrey confirmed that the club would receive a fee and the agreement included add-ons and a sell-on clause.

On 31 August 2023, Blythe joined Cymru Premier club Barry Town United on a season-long loan deal.

Following the conclusion of the 2023–24 season, Blythe departed Swansea City upon the expiration of his contract.

=== Non-League ===
On 30 September 2024, Blyth joined Northern Premier League Division One East club Bradford (Park Avenue).

In February 2026, Blythe joined Leamington on dual-registration from Spalding United.

== Career statistics ==
As of end of 2023–24 season

Appearances and goals by club, season and competition
Club	Season	League			FA Cup		EFL Cup		Other		Total	
Club	Season	Division	Apps	Goals	Apps	Goals	Apps	Goals	Apps	Goals	Apps	Goals
Doncaster Rovers	2020–21	League One	1	0	0	0	0	0	0	0	1	0
Doncaster Rovers	2021–22	League One	2	0	2	0	1	0	1	0	6	0
Doncaster Rovers	Total		3	0	2	0	1	0	1	10	7	0
Farsley Celtic (loan)	2021–22	National League North	4	0	—		—		—		4	0
Swansea City	2023–24	Championship	0	0	0	0	0	0	—		0	0
Barry Town United (loan)	2023–24	Cymru Premier	22	2	1	0	0	0	0	0	23	2
Career total			29	2	3	0	1	0	1	0	34	2
