= Daniel Williams (footballer, born 2001) =

Welsh footballer

Personal information
- Full name: Daniel Patrick Williams
- Date of birth: 19 April 2001 (age 25)
- Place of birth: Wales
- Position: Midfielder

Team information
- Current team: The New Saints
- Number: 14

Youth career
- 2009–2020: Swansea City

Senior career*
Years	Team	Apps	(Gls)
2020–2023	Swansea City	0	(0)
2022	→ Dundalk (loan)	10	(0)
2022–2023	→ The New Saints (loan)	22	(2)
2023–	The New Saints	98	(10)

International career^{‡}
2021–	Wales U21	8	(1)
- * Club domestic league appearances and goals as of 06:42, 7 November 2026 (UTC) ‡ National team caps and goals as of 21:05, 19 January 2023 (UTC)

Daniel Patrick Williams (born 19 April 2001) is a Welsh professional footballer who plays as a midfielder for Cymru Premier club The New Saints.

== Career ==
Williams joined the youth academy of Swansea City as a U8, and signed his first professional contract with the club in the summer of 2019. He made his professional debut with Swansea City in a 3–0 EFL Cup win over Reading on 10 August 2021. He scored his first goal for the club in the following round in a 4-0 win over Plymouth Argyle on 24 August 2021.

In June 2023, Williams signed permanently for Cymru Premier club The New Saints having spent the previous season with the club on loan.

== Career statistics ==
As of match played 1 August 2023

Appearances and goals by club, season and competition
Club	Season	League			National Cup		League Cup		Other		Total	
Club	Season	Division	Apps	Goals	Apps	Goals	Apps	Goals	Apps	Goals	Apps	Goals
Swansea City	2021–22	Championship	0	0	0	0	2	1	—		2	1
Swansea City	2022–23	Championship	0	0	0	0	0	0	—		0	0
Swansea City	Total		0	0	0	0	2	1	—		2	1
Dundalk (loan)	2022	LOI Premier Division	10	0	—		—		—		10	0
The New Saints (loan)	2022–23	Cymru Premier	22	2	4	0	—		1 (Note: Appearance in Scottish Challenge Cup)	0	27	0
The New Saints	2023–24	Cymru Premier	0	0	0	0	0	0	4 (Note: 2 appearance in UEFA Champions League & 2 appearances in UEFA Europa Conference League)	0	4	0
Career total			32	2	4	0	2	1	5	0	43	1
