= Andy Fisher (footballer) =

English footballer (born 1998)

Andrew Fisher
Personal information
- Full name: Andrew Lee Fisher
- Date of birth: 12 February 1998 (age 28)
- Place of birth: Wigan, England
- Height: 6 ft 2 in (1.89 m)
- Position: Goalkeeper

Team information
- Current team: Swansea City
- Number: 1

Youth career
- 2013–2016: Blackburn Rovers

Senior career*
| Years | Team | Apps | (Gls) |
| 2016–2020 | Blackburn Rovers | 0 | (0) |
| 2019 | → FC United of Manchester (loan) | 13 | (0) |
| 2019 | → Northampton Town (loan) | 0 | (0) |
| 2020 | → Milton Keynes Dons (loan) | 0 | (0) |
| 2020–2022 | Milton Keynes Dons | 62 | (0) |
| 2022– | Swansea City | 47 | (0) |
| 2025 | → St Johnstone (loan) | 12 | (0) |
- * Club domestic league appearances and goals as of 2 May 2026 (UTC)

Andrew Lee Fisher (born 12 February 1998) is an English professional footballer who plays as a goalkeeper for EFL Championship club Swansea City.

== Club career ==
=== Blackburn Rovers ===
In January 2016 Fisher signed his first professional contract at Blackburn Rovers penning a two-and-a-half-year deal. On 29 August 2017 he made his first team debut, keeping a clean sheet in a 1–0 EFL Trophy group stage win over Stoke City U21. Two months later, Fisher signed an extended deal keeping him at the club until the summer of 2021.

Over the following two seasons, Fisher found limited first team opportunities and was sent out on loan to FC United of Manchester, Northampton Town and Milton Keynes Dons.

=== Milton Keynes Dons ===
On 16 October 2020, Fisher re-joined former loan club Milton Keynes Dons on a permanent deal, eventually replacing Lee Nicholls as first choice goalkeeper under manager Russell Martin, and continued under Martin's successor, Liam Manning.

=== Swansea City ===
On 11 January 2022, Fisher joined Swansea City on a permanent four-and-a-half-year deal for an undisclosed fee in the region of £400,000.

== Career statistics ==
As of match played 11 January 2026

| Club | Season | League | | | National cup (Note: Includes Scottish FA Cup, FA Cup) | | League cup (Note: Includes Scottish League Cup, EFL Cup) | | Other | | Total | |
| Club | Season | Division | Apps | Goals | Apps | Goals | Apps | Goals | Apps | Goals | Apps | Goals |
|---|---|---|---|---|---|---|---|---|---|---|---|---|
| Blackburn Rovers | 2017–18 | League One | 0 | 0 | 0 | 0 | 0 | 0 | 3 (Note: Appearance(s) in the EFL Trophy.) | 0 | 3 | 0 |
| Blackburn Rovers | 2018–19 | Championship | 0 | 0 | 0 | 0 | 0 | 0 | — | | 0 | 0 |
| Blackburn Rovers | 2019–20 | Championship | 0 | 0 | 0 | 0 | 0 | 0 | — | | 0 | 0 |
| Blackburn Rovers | 2020–21 | Championship | 0 | 0 | 0 | 0 | 1 | 0 | — | | 1 | 0 |
| Blackburn Rovers | Total | | 0 | 0 | 0 | 0 | 1 | 0 | 3 | 0 | 4 | 0 |
| FC United of Manchester (loan) | 2018–19 | National League North | 13 | 0 | 0 | 0 | 0 | 0 | 0 | 0 | 13 | 0 |
| Northampton Town (loan) | 2019–20 | League Two | 0 | 0 | 0 | 0 | 0 | 0 | 3 | 0 | 3 | 0 |
| Milton Keynes Dons (loan) | 2019–20 | League One | 0 | 0 | — | | — | | — | | 0 | 0 |
| Milton Keynes Dons | 2020–21 | League One | 39 | 0 | 0 | 0 | — | | 0 | 0 | 39 | 0 |
| Milton Keynes Dons | 2021–22 | League One | 23 | 0 | 2 | 0 | 0 | 0 | 0 | 0 | 25 | 0 |
| Milton Keynes Dons | Total | | 62 | 0 | 2 | 0 | 0 | 0 | 0 | 0 | 64 | 0 |
| Swansea City | 2021–22 | Championship | 20 | 0 | 0 | 0 | 0 | 0 | 0 | 0 | 20 | 0 |
| Swansea City | 2022–23 | Championship | 26 | 0 | 1 | 0 | 0 | 0 | 0 | 0 | 27 | 0 |
| Swansea City | 2023–24 | Championship | 0 | 0 | 0 | 0 | 0 | 0 | 0 | 0 | 0 | 0 |
| Swansea City | 2024–25 | Championship | 0 | 0 | 0 | 0 | 0 | 0 | 0 | 0 | 0 | 0 |
| Swansea City | 2025–26 | Championship | 0 | 0 | 1 | 0 | 4 | 0 | 0 | 0 | 5 | 0 |
| Swansea City | Total | | 46 | 0 | 2 | 0 | 4 | 0 | 0 | 0 | 52 | 0 |
| St Johnstone (loan) | 2024-25 | Scottish Premiership | 14 | 0 | 4 | 0 | 0 | 0 | 0 | 0 | 18 | 0 |
| Career total | | | 135 | 0 | 8 | 0 | 5 | 0 | 6 | 0 | 154 | 0 |
