= 2026–27 Wycombe Wanderers F.C. season =

140th season in existence of Wycombe Wanderers FC

Wycombe Wanderers
2026–27 season
- Owner: Blue Ocean Partners II Limited 80% Wycombe Wanderers Supporters Trust 10% Dan Rice 10%
- Chairman: Dan Rice
- Head Coach: Tom Hounsell (from 10 October); Tom Hounsell (interim from 8 September); Michael Duff (until 8 September)
- Stadium: Adams Park
- EFL Cup: First round

The 2026–27 season is the 140th season in the history of Wycombe Wanderers Football Club and their sixth consecutive season in League One. In addition to the domestic league, the club would also participate in the FA Cup, the EFL Cup, the EFL Trophy and the Berks & Bucks Senior Cup.

== Managerial changes ==
On 8 September, the club parted company with Michael Duff after a run of disappointing results since the spring. Tom Hounsell was then appointed as interim head coach. Following a positive spell as interim head coach, Hounsell was appointed permanently on 10 October.

== Transfers and contracts ==
=== In ===
Date	Pos.	Player	From	Fee	Ref.
1 July 2026 (Note: The transfer was announced on 3 June, and would become official on July 1 once Hazard's contract at Plymouth Argyle expired.)	GK	(Northern Ireland) Conor Hazard	(England) Plymouth Argyle	Free	
1 July 2026 (Note: The transfer was announced on 9 June, and would become official on July 1 once Macey's contract at Colchester United expired.)	GK	(England) Matt Macey	(England) Colchester United	Free	
3 July 2026	CB	(England) Steve Cook	(England) Queens Park Rangers	Free	
10 July 2026	CF/CAM	(England) Cauley Woodrow	(England) Luton Town	Undisclosed	
15 July 2026	RW	(England) Silko Thomas	(England) Leicester City	Free	
31 August 2026	CF	(England) Jayden Wareham	(England) Exeter City	Undisclosed	
4 September 2026	CAM	(England) Kaylan Hemmings	(England) ECA College	—N/a	
24 September 2026	GK	(England) Joe Wildsmith	(England) West Bromwich Albion	Free	
25 September 2026	CF	(England) Danny Ings	(England) Sheffield United	Free	

=== Out ===
Date	Pos.	Player	To	Fee	Ref.
14 July 2026	RW	(England) James Tilley	(England) AFC Wimbledon	Undisclosed	

=== Loaned in ===
Date	Pos.	Player	From	Loaned until	Ref.
23 July 2026	CF	(England) Emre Tezgel	(England) Stoke City	End of Season	
28 July 2026	RB	(Wales) Sam Parker	(Wales) Swansea City	End of Season	
27 August 2026	LW	(Jamaica) Malik Mothersille	(England) Stockport County	End of Season	

=== Loaned out ===
Date	Pos.	Player	To	Loaned until	Ref.
15 June 2026 (Note: The loan was announced on 12 June and became official on 15 June once the transfer window opened.)	CB	(England) Jack Matton	(England) Aldershot Town	End of season	
26 June 2026	LW	(England) James Berry	(England) Forest Green Rovers	End of season	
21 July 2026	CB	(England) Declan Skura	(England) Walsall	End of season	
25 July 2026	CAM	(Scotland) Alex Lowry	(Scotland) Motherwell	End of season	
22 August 2026	CF	(Switzerland) Bradley Fink	(Scotland) Dundee	End of season	
28 August 2026	CB	(England) Taylor Allen	(England) Salford City	End of season	
9 October 2026	LB	(England) Jackson King	(England) Wimborne Town	9 November 2026	

=== Released / Out of Contract ===
Date	Pos.	Player	Subsequent club	Joined date	Ref.
30 June 2026	GK	(England) Will Norris	(England) Salford City	1 July 2026	
30 June 2026	GK	(England) Shamal George	(England) Bromley	10 July 2026	
30 June 2026	LW	(Angola) André Vidigal	(Portugal) Alverca	21 August 2026	
30 June 2026	RB	(England) Fin Back			
30 June 2026	GK	(Kosovo) Laurence Shala			

=== New Contract ===
Date	Pos.	Player	Contracted until	Ref.
26 June 2026	RW	(Nigeria) Fred Onyedinma	Undisclosed	
17 July 2026	RW	(Nigeria) Micah Olabiyi	Undisclosed (Note: First professional contract)	
17 October 2026	RB	(Scotland) Jack Grimmer	Undisclosed	

=== In ===
Date	Pos.	Player	From	Fee	Ref.
5 May 2026		Jamai Barnes	Wycombe Wanderers U16s		
5 May 2026		Max Collins	Wycombe Wanderers U16s		
5 May 2026		(England) Josh Esho	Wycombe Wanderers U16s		
5 May 2026		(Antigua and Barbuda) Luke Harney-Rogerson	Wycombe Wanderers U16s		
5 May 2026		Noah Hawkins	Wycombe Wanderers U16s		
5 May 2026		Kieran Haynes	Wycombe Wanderers U16s		
5 May 2026		Riley Johnson	Wycombe Wanderers U16s		
5 May 2026		Leo Measoud	Wycombe Wanderers U16s		
5 May 2026		Noel Opurum	Wycombe Wanderers U16s		
2 July 2026	CF	(England) Jahrel McKoy	(England) Cambridge United U18s	Free	

=== Loaned out ===
Date	Pos.	Player	To	Loaned until	Ref.
3 July 2026	LB	(England) Arthur Gregory	(England) Slough Town	End of season	
6 July 2026	CF	(England) Jahiem Dotse	(England) Sholing	4 January 2027	
14 August 2026	CB	(England) Josh Gidaree	(England) Uxbridge	2 January 2027	
14 August 2026	GK	(England) Jonny Pettitt	(England) Aylesbury United	11 September 2026	
14 August 2026	CB	(England) Archie Quinlan	(England) Leverstock Green	11 September 2026	

== Pre-season and friendlies ==
On 4 June, Wycombe announced a behind closed doors friendly with Yeovil Town on Saturday 25th July. Six days later, an away friendly with Farnham Town was confirmed on Tuesday 21st July. On the same day, a home friendly with Portsmouth after the Yeovil Town friendly was confirmed along with a behind closed doors friendly with Queens Park Rangers scheduled on the 21st of July before the Farnham Town fixture. On 16 June, a home friendly with Ipswich Town was confirmed Saturday 1st of August. On 2 July, a behind closed doors friendly with Ebbsfleet United was confirmed on Saturday 11th July.

Win Draw Loss Fixtures

11 July 2026 Friendly	Wycombe Wanderers	4–0	Ebbsfleet United	Marlow
11:30	Olabiyi 8'; Fink 16'; Mullins 35'; Henderson 66'	Report		Stadium: Wycombe Wanderers Training Ground; Attendance: 0 (BCD)

18 July 2026 Friendly	Brighton & Hove Albion	4–1	Wycombe Wanderers	Lancing
14:00 BST	Kostoulas (x2); Osman; Rutter	Report	Harvie	Stadium: American Express Elite Football Performance Centre; Attendance: 0 (BCD)

21 July 2026 Friendly	Queens Park Rangers	1–0	Wycombe Wanderers	Heston
12:00 BST	Kone 80'	Report		Stadium: TSG Elite Training & Performance Centre; Attendance: 0 (BCD)

21 July 2026 Friendly	Farnham Town	2–1	Wycombe Wanderers	Farnham
19:45 BST	Sanders 13'; Dean 53'	Report	McKoy 82'	Stadium: The Memorial Ground

25 July 2026 Friendly	Wycombe Wanderers	3–2	Yeovil Town	Marlow
10:00 BST	Leahy; Boyd-Munce; Fink	Report	Obeng; McCormick	Stadium: Marlow Road Training Ground; Attendance: 0 (BCD)

25 July 2026 Friendly	Wycombe Wanderers	3–1	Portsmouth	High Wycombe
16:00 BST	Henderson 2'; Woodrow 46'; Olabiyi 73'	Report	Waddingham 90'	Stadium: Adams Park; Attendance: 1,820 (578 away)

1 August 2026 Friendly	Wycombe Wanderers	1–2	Ipswich Town	High Wycombe
16:00 BST	Tezgel 56'	Report	Humphreys 75', 90'	Stadium: Adams Park; Attendance: 2,209 (631 Ipswich fans)

5 August 2026 Friendly	Brentford	4–1	Wycombe Wanderers	Osterley
13:00 BST	Damsgaard; Henry; Wilson; Lewis-Potter	Report	Tezgel	Stadium: Brentford FC Training Ground; Attendance: 0 (BCD)

== Competitions ==
=== EFL League One ===
==== League table ====
Pos	Team	Pld	W	D	L	GF	GA	GD	Pts
13	Mansfield Town	14	5	5	4	21	19	+2	20
14	Stevenage	13	5	4	4	18	13	+5	19
15	Wycombe Wanderers	14	4	6	4	24	27	−3	18
16	Burton Albion	16	4	5	7	21	29	−8	17
17	Wigan Athletic	16	5	2	9	15	24	−9	17

Updated to match(es) played on 21 November 2026. Source: EFL Official Website
Rules for classification: 1) Points; 2) Goal difference; 3) Number of goals scored; 4) Head-to-head results; 5) Wins; 6) Away goals; 7) Penalty points (sec 9.5); 8) 12-point sending off offences

==== Results summary ====
Overall								Home						Away					
Pld	W	D	L	GF	GA	GD	Pts	W	D	L	GF	GA	GD	W	D	L	GF	GA	GD
13	4	6	3	20	22	−2	18	2	3	2	12	12	0	2	3	1	8	10	−2

Last updated: 31 October 2026.
Source: Soccerway

==== Results by round ====
Round	1	2	3	4	5	6	7	8	10	11	12	13	14	15^{2}	16	9^{1}	17	18	19	20	21	22	23	24	25	26	27	28	29	30	31	32	33	34	35	36	37	38	39	40	41	42	43	44	45	46
Ground	A	H	A	H	H	A	A	H	H	H	A	A	H	H	A	A	H	A	A	H	A	H	H	A	A	H	H	A	H	A	A	H	A	H	A	H	A	H	A	H	A	H	A	H	A	H
Result	D	D	L	L	D	W	W	D	L	W	D	D	W	P																																
Position	16	16	22	24	23	19	14	12	15	11	15	14	13	P																																
Points	1	2	2	2	3	6	9	10	10	13	14	15	18	P																																

Source: EFL
A = Away; H = Home; W = Win; D = Draw; L = Loss; P = Postponed
Notes:
- ^{1} Matchday 9 (vs. Bromley) was postponed due to international call-ups.
- ^{1} Matchday 15 (vs. Huddersfield Town) was postponed due to international call-ups.

==== Matches ====
On 25 June, the League One fixtures for the season were announced, with Wycombe visiting Blackpool on the opening weekend.

Win Draw Loss Fixtures

15 August 2026 1	Blackpool	1–1	Wycombe Wanderers	Blackpool
12:30 BST	Coulson (yellow card) 16'; Morgan (yellow card) 64'; Munroe 77'	Report	Onyedinma 7', (yellow card) 80'; Henderson (yellow card) 27'; Harvie (yellow card) 84'	Stadium: Bloomfield Road; Attendance: 9,911; Referee: Seb Stockbridge

22 August 2026 2	Wycombe Wanderers	1–1	Plymouth Argyle	High Wycombe
15:00 BST	Henderson (yellow card) 45+1'; Taylor 76'	Report	Evans 25', (yellow card) 80'; Harding (yellow card) 75'; Ibrahim (yellow card) 84'	Stadium: Adams Park; Attendance: 6,065 (inc. 1,539 away fans); Referee: Neil Hair

29 August 2026 3	Stockport County	5–1	Wycombe Wanderers	Edgeley
15:00 BST	Wood 16', 23'; Wootton 56'; Diamond 61'; Mandron 89'	Report	Woodrow 43'	Stadium: Edgeley Park; Attendance: 8,774 (inc. 331 away fans); Referee: Edward Duckworth

1 September 2026 4	Wycombe Wanderers	1–2	Sheffield Wednesday	High Wycombe
19:45 BST	Woodrow 6'; Henderson (yellow card) 79'	Report	Barry 11'; Slattery (yellow card) 44'; Lowe 45+8' (pen.); Bannan (yellow card) 83'	Stadium: Adams Park; Attendance: 6,095 (inc. 1,801 away fans); Referee: David Rock

5 September 2026 5	Wycombe Wanderers	3–3	Milton Keynes Dons	High Wycombe
15:00 BST	Casey 11'; Henderson 31'; Wareham 74'	Report	Gilbey (yellow card) 36'; Collins (yellow card) 41', (goal) 51'; Paterson 55'; Nelson 59'; Ekpiteta (yellow card) 84'	Stadium: Adams Park; Attendance: 5,920 (inc. 1,299 away fans); Referee: Stephen Martin

12 September 2026 6	Leyton Orient	2–3	Wycombe Wanderers	Leyton
12:30 BST	Grimmer 37' (o.g.); Kabia 52'	Report	Wareham 13'; Harvie (yellow card) 30', (goal) 47'; Onyedinma 45+2'; Woodrow (yellow card) 80'; Boyd-Munce (yellow card) 90+1'	Stadium: BetWright Stadium; Attendance: 7,171; Referee: Simon Mather
Note: Fixture was initially scheduled for a 15:00 kick-off, but was brought forward for live Sky Sports broadcasting.

19 September 2026 7	Wigan Athletic	0–1	Wycombe Wanderers	Wigan
15:00 BST	Carragher (yellow card) 25'; Power (yellow card) 36'; Mellish (yellow card) 43'; Gray (yellow card) 61'; Weir (yellow card) 85'; Sze (yellow card) 90+4'	Report	Casey 68'; Henderson (yellow card) 86'	Stadium: Brick Community Stadium; Attendance: 8,643 (inc. 303 away fans); Referee: Dean Whitestone

26 September 2026 8	Wycombe Wanderers	2–2	Reading	High Wycombe
15:00 BST	Casey (yellow card) 30'; Wareham 61'; Harvie (yellow card) 68'; Ings 90'	Report	O'Connor 47'; Lisbie (yellow card) 68'; Brown 80'; Roberts (yellow card) 88'; Ward (yellow card) 90+5'	Stadium: Adams Park; Attendance: 7,191 (inc. 1,834 away fans); Referee: Tom Reeves

10 October 2026 10	Wycombe Wanderers	1–4	Luton Town	High Wycombe
15:00 BST	Grimmer 90+5'		Palmer 16'; Donley 27'; Naismith (yellow card) 40'; Wells 46'; Walsh (yellow card) 76'; Cole 84'	Stadium: Adams Park; Attendance: (inc. 1,759 away fans); Referee: Scott Oldham

17 October 2026 11	Wycombe Wanderers	2–0	Notts County	High Wycombe
15:00 BST	Grimmer (yellow card) 22', (goal) 44'; Onyedinma 86'		Robertson (yellow card) 77'; Gibbons (yellow card) 90+4'	Stadium: Adams Park; Attendance: (inc. 1,104 away fans); Referee: Lewis Sandoe

20 October 2026 12	Cambridge United	2–2	Wycombe Wanderers	Cambridge
19:45 BST	Lavery 78'; Bangura-Williams (yellow card) 84'; Taylor 90+2' (o.g.)	Report	Wareham 44', 61', (yellow card) 51'; Harvie (yellow card) 66'; Henderson (yellow card) 90+5'	Stadium: Cledara Abbey Stadium; Attendance: 5,776; Referee: Andrew Humphries

24 October 2026 13	AFC Wimbledon	1–1	Wycombe Wanderers	Wimbledon
15:00 BST	Stockley 29'; Seddon (yellow card) 67'	Report	Onyedinma 60'	Stadium: Plough Lane Stadium; Attendance: 8,069; Referee: Craig Hicks

31 October 2026 14	Wycombe Wanderers	2–0	Burton Albion	High Wycombe
15:00 BST	Harvie (yellow card) 12'; Wareham 21'; Mothersille (yellow card) 38'; Woodrow 54'	Report	Sibbick (yellow card) 38'	Stadium: Adams Park; Referee: Thomas Parsons

14 November 2026 15	Wycombe Wanderers	Postponed	Huddersfield Town	High Wycombe
15:00 BST				Stadium: Adams Park
Note: Fixture was postponed due to international call-ups.

21 November 2026 16	Oxford United	4–3	Wycombe Wanderers	Oxford
15:00 BST	Emakhu 73'; Brannagan 80' (pen.); Harris 81'; O'Donkor 90+5'; Sibley (yellow card) 90+10'		Wareham 1'; Casey (yellow card) 53' (yellow-red card) 62'; Mothersille 57'; Morley 67'; Leahy (yellow card) 78' (red card); Grimmer (yellow card) 90+7'; Parker (yellow card) 90+9'	Stadium: Kassam Stadium; Attendance: 11,190; Referee: Martin Coy

24 November 2026 9	Bromley	v	Wycombe Wanderers	Bromley
19:45 GMT				Stadium: Copperjax Community Stadium
Note: Fixture was originally scheduled for 3 October, but it was postponed due to international call-ups with the Bromley squad. It was later rescheduled for 24 November.

28 November 2026 17	Wycombe Wanderers	v	Bradford City	High Wycombe
15:00 BST				Stadium: Adams Park

1 December 2026 18	Barnsley	v	Wycombe Wanderers	Barnsley
19:45 BST				Stadium: Oakwell

12 December 2026 19	Mansfield Town	v	Wycombe Wanderers	Mansfield
15:00 BST				Stadium: One Call Stadium

19 December 2026 20	Wycombe Wanderers	v	Doncaster Rovers	High Wycombe
15:00 BST				Stadium: Adams Park

26 December 2026 21	Peterborough United	v	Wycombe Wanderers	Peterborough
15:00 BST				Stadium: Weston Homes Stadium

29 December 2026 22	Wycombe Wanderers	v	Stevenage	High Wycombe
19:45 BST				Stadium: Adams Park

1 January 2027 23	Wycombe Wanderers	v	Leicester City	High Wycombe
15:00 BST				Stadium: Adams Park

9 January 2027 24	Doncaster Rovers	v	Wycombe Wanderers	Doncaster
15:00 BST				Stadium: Club Doncaster Sports Village

16 January 2027 25	Notts County	v	Wycombe Wanderers	Nottingham
15:00 BST				Stadium: Meadow Lane

19 January 2027 26	Wycombe Wanderers	v	Cambridge United	High Wycombe
19:45 BST				Stadium: Adams Park

23 January 2027 27	Wycombe Wanderers	v	AFC Wimbledon	High Wycombe
15:00 BST				Stadium: Adams Park

30 January 2027 28	Burton Albion	v	Wycombe Wanderers	Burton upon Trent
15:00 BST				Stadium: Pirelli Stadium

6 February 2027 29	Wycombe Wanderers	v	Stockport County	High Wycombe
15:00 BST				Stadium: Adams Park

9 February 2027 30	Sheffield Wednesday	v	Wycombe Wanderers	Owlerton
19:45 BST				Stadium: Hillsborough Stadium

13 February 2027 31	MK Dons	v	Wycombe Wanderers	Denbigh
12:30 BST				Stadium: Stadium MK
Note: Fixture was initially scheduled for a 15:00 kick-off, but was brought forward for live Sky Sports broadcasting.

20 February 2027 32	Wycombe Wanderers	v	Leyton Orient	High Wycombe
15:00 BST				Stadium: Adams Park

27 February 2027 33	Huddersfield Town	v	Wycombe Wanderers	Huddersfield
15:00 BST				Stadium: Accu Stadium

6 March 2027 34	Wycombe Wanderers	v	Blackpool	High Wycombe
15:00 BST				Stadium: Adams Park

13 March 2027 35	Plymouth Argyle	v	Wycombe Wanderers	Milehouse
15:00 BST				Stadium: Home Park

20 March 2027 36	Wycombe Wanderers	v	Oxford United	High Wycombe
15:00 BST				Stadium: Adams Park

26 March 2027 37	Leicester City	v	Wycombe Wanderers	Leicester
15:00 BST				Stadium: King Power Stadium

29 March 2027 38	Wycombe Wanderers	v	Peterborough United	High Wycombe
15:00 BST				Stadium: Adams Park

3 April 2027 39	Stevenage	v	Wycombe Wanderers	Stevenage
15:00 BST				Stadium: Broadhall Way

10 April 2027 40	Wycombe Wanderers	v	Mansfield Town	High Wycombe
15:00 BST				Stadium: Adams Park

13 April 2027 41	Reading	v	Wycombe Wanderers	Reading
20:00 BST				Stadium: Select Car Leasing Stadium

17 April 2027 42	Wycombe Wanderers	v	Wigan Athletic	High Wycombe
15:00 BST				Stadium: Adams Park

24 April 2027 43	Luton Town	v	Wycombe Wanderers	Luton
15:00 BST				Stadium: Kenilworth Road

27 April 2027 44	Wycombe Wanderers	v	Bromley	High Wycombe
19:45 BST				Stadium: Adams Park

1 May 2027 45	Bradford City	v	Wycombe Wanderers	Bradford
15:00 BST				Stadium: University of Bradford Stadium

8 May 2027 46	Wycombe Wanderers	v	Barnsley	High Wycombe
12:30 BST				Stadium: Adams Park

=== FA Cup ===
Wycombe were drawn away to Accrington Stanley in the first round and home to Milton Keynes Dons in the second round.

Win Draw Loss Fixtures

7 November 2026 First round	Accrington Stanley	0–2	Wycombe Wanderers	Accrington
15:00 GMT	Whalley (yellow card) 61'; Matthews (yellow card) 87'	Report	Taylor 5', (yellow card) 87'; Harvie 69'	Stadium: Wham Stadium; Attendance: 1,510; Referee: Dale Baines

4 December 2026 Second round	Wycombe Wanderers	v	Milton Keynes Dons	High Wycombe
19:45 GMT				Stadium: Adams Park

=== EFL Cup ===
Wycombe were drawn at home to Stevenage in the first round.

Win Draw Loss Fixtures

7 August 2025 First round	Wycombe Wanderers	1–2	Stevenage	High Wycombe
19:45 BST	Onyedinma (yellow card) 33'; Henderson 39', (yellow card) 79'	Report	Roberts (yellow card) 22'; Kemp 27', (yellow card) 35'; James-Wildin (yellow card) 42'; Piergianni (yellow card) 69'; Magennis 90+5'	Stadium: Adams Park; Attendance: 2,510 (inc. 324 away); Referee: Jamie O'Connor

=== EFL Trophy ===
==== Group Stage ====
Wycombe were drawn against Reading, Bristol Rovers and Chelsea U21 into Southern Group C.

Pos	Div	Team	Pld	W	PW	PL	L	GF	GA	GD	Pts	Qualification
1	L1	Wycombe Wanderers	3	2	0	1	0	7	3	+4	7	Advance to Round 2
2	ACA	Chelsea U21	3	1	1	0	1	5	4	+1	5	Advance to Round 2
3	L1	Reading	3	0	1	1	1	3	5	−2	3	
4	L2	Bristol Rovers	3	0	1	1	1	5	8	−3	3	

Source: EFL

Win Draw Loss Fixtures

18 August 2026 Group stage	Reading	1–1 (3–1 p)	Wycombe Wanderers	Reading
19:00 BST	Savage (yellow card) 56'; Fraser 76', (yellow card) 87'	Report	Quitirna 71'	Stadium: Select Car Leasing Stadium; Attendance: 2,652 (294 away); Referee: Isaac Searle
	Penalties
	Savage (penalty scored); Fraser (penalty scored); Lane (penalty scored)		Tezgel (penalty missed); Boyd-Munce (penalty scored); Hagelskjær (penalty missed); Leahy (penalty missed)

15 September 2026 Group stage	Wycombe Wanderers	2–1	Chelsea U21	High Wycombe
19:00 BST	Morley (yellow card) 60'; Keita 66'; Taylor (yellow card) 77'; Boyd-Munce 85'		Bettoni 90+2'	Stadium: Adams Park; Attendance: 778; Referee: Ben Atkinson

6 October 2026 Group stage	Wycombe Wanderers	4–1	Bristol Rovers	High Wycombe
19:00 BST	Mothersille 4'; Tezgel 22', 87'; Woodrow 33'; Leahy (yellow card) 68'	Report	Leigh (yellow card) 45+3'; Harrison 73'; Sparkes (yellow card) 79'	Stadium: Adams Park; Referee: Harrison Blair

== Wycombe Wanderers PDP Fixtures ==
Win Draw Loss Fixtures

=== Group J ===
Team	Pld	W	D	L	GF	GA	GD	Pts
Brentford	4	3	1	0	9	4	+5	10
Hull City	4	2	2	0	6	2	+4	8
Wycombe Wanderers	3	0	1	2	1	4	−3	1
Derby County	3	0	0	3	3	9	−6	0

Updated to match(es) played on 2 November 2026. Source:

16 August 2026	Brentford	2–0	Wycombe Wanderers	Staines-upon-Thames
12:00 BST	Dasilva 59'; Boni 81'	Report	Stones (yellow card); Cross (yellow card)	Stadium: Wheatsheaf Park; Attendance: 400; Referee: Daniel Blades

13 October 2026	Hull City	0–0	Wycombe Wanderers	North Ferriby
19:00 BST	Yellow card	Report	Yellow card	Stadium: Versa Sportswear Stadium; Referee: Stuart Morland

2 November 2026	Wycombe Wanderers	1–2	Brentford	High Wycombe
19:00 GMT	Tezgel 45+3'	Report	Yarmolyuk 45'; Bobb-Semple 87'	Stadium: Adams Park; Attendance: 113; Referee: Joe Woolmer

27 November 2026	Derby County	v	Wycombe Wanderers	Long Eaton
19:00 GMT				Stadium: Grange Park

1 December 2026	Wycombe Wanderers	v	Derby County	High Wycombe
19:00 GMT				Stadium: Adams Park

9 December 2026	Wycombe Wanderers	v	Hull City	High Wycombe
19:00 GMT				Stadium: Adams Park

=== EFL Youth Alliance League South ===
8 August 2026	Wycombe Wanderers U18s	3–2	Newport County U18s	Harlington
11:00 BST	Trialist 15'; McKoy 36'; Stones 45'; Prempeh-Murray (yellow card) 64'	Report	62' (pen.); 86'	Stadium: Harlington Sports Ground

22 August 2026	Wycombe Wanderers U18s	2–2	Stevenage U18s	Harlington
11:00 BST	Adu (yellow card) 34' (yellow-red card) 85'; Cross 70' (pen.), 90+4'	Report	7'; 43'; (red card) 90+4'	Stadium: Harlington Sports Ground

29 August 2026	Wycombe Wanderers U18s	4–1	Watford U18s	Harlington
11:00 BST	Olabiyi 23'; McKoy 42'; Cross 67', 85'; Harney-Rogerson (yellow card) 75'	Report	29'	Stadium: Harlington Sports Ground

5 September 2026	Wycombe Wanderers U18s	5–3	Cheltenham Town U18s	Harlington
11:00 BST	Gurpinar 27', 32', 50', 66'; Hemmings 38'			Stadium: Harlington Sports Ground

12 September 2026	Leyton Orient U18s	2–4	Wycombe Wanderers U18s	Buckhurst Hill
10:30 BST	Mensah 8', 52'; Cornell (yellow card) 65'; Drayton (yellow card) 78'		Gurpinar 1'; Cross 33'; Hemmings 37'; Stones 75'	Stadium: Buckhurst Hill

29 September 2026	Bromley U18s	0–2	Wycombe Wanderers U18s	Bromley
6:00 BST			Cross 36'; Stones 84'	Stadium: Hayes Lane

3 October 2026	AFC Wimbledon U18s	1–0	Wycombe Wanderers U18s	New Malden
10:30 BST	Adebanjo			Stadium: New Malden Sports Ground

10 October 2026	Wycombe Wanderers U18s	1–3	Northampton Town U18s	Harlington
11:00 BST	Stones 78'	Report	Campbell 23'; Alonge 65'; Misys 88'	Stadium: Harlington Sports Ground

17 October 2026	Portsmouth U18s	1–2	Wycombe Wanderers U18s	Portsmouth
11:00 BST	Thomas	Report	Harney-Rogerson; (o.g.)	Stadium: Copnor Road

24 October 2026	Wycombe Wanderers U18s	2–0	Swindon Town U18s	Harlington
11:00 BST	Gurpinar 32'; Stones			Stadium: Harlington Sports Ground

14 November 2026	Bristol Rovers U18s	1–2	Wycombe Wanderers U18s
11:00 BST		Report

28 November 2026	Wycombe Wanderers U18s	v	Luton Town U18s	Harlington
11:00 BST				Stadium: Harlington Sports Ground

=== EFL Youth Alliance Cup ===
19 September 2026 Group D	Cheltenham Town U18s	3–0	Wycombe Wanderers U18s	Cheltenham
11:00 BST				Stadium: Cheltenham Town Academy Training Ground

13 October 2026 Group D	Luton Town U18s	1–2	Wycombe Wanderers U18s	Luton
12:00 BST	Barnes 18'		Esho 22'; Harney-Rogerson 90+1'	Stadium: Luton Town Academy

=== FA Youth Cup ===
27 October 2026 1st Round	Aldershot Town	2–4	Wycombe Wanderers	Aldershot
19:00 GMT	Kircher; Popa		Cross (pen.); Harney-Rogerson	Stadium: Recreation Ground; Referee: Catalin Tanase

17 November 2026 2nd Round	Wycombe Wanderers	3–0	Leyton Orient	High Wycombe
19:45 GMT	Stones 15'; Cross 42', 82'			Stadium: Adams Park; Attendance: 209

12 December 2026 3rd Round	Wycombe Wanderers	v	Wigan Athletic	High Wycombe
				Stadium: Adams Park

=== Berks & Bucks Senior Cup ===
7th October 2026 Round 2	Winslow United	2–3	Wycombe Wanderers	Winslow
19:45 BST	11'; Woolley 89'	Report	Olabiyi 21'; Stones 55'; McKoy (yellow card) 62'; Cross 90'	Stadium: Elmfields Gate

10th November 2026 Round 3	Ascot United	0–6	Wycombe Wanderers	Ascot
19:45 BST			Stones 20', 32', 44', 82'; McKoy 49'; Gidaree 87'	Stadium: The Racecourse Ground

7th December 2026 Quarterfinals	Wokingham Town	v	Wycombe Wanderers	Wokingham
19:45 BST				Stadium: Lowther Road

== Statistics ==
=== Appearances and goals ===
As of match played 7 November 2026

Players with no appearances are not included on the list; italics indicate a loaned in player

No.	Pos	Nat	Player	Total		League One		FA Cup		EFL Cup		EFL Trophy	
No.	Pos	Nat	Player	Apps	Goals	Apps	Goals	Apps	Goals	Apps	Goals	Apps	Goals
1	GK	(Netherlands) NED	Mikki van Sas	2	0	0+0	0	0+0	0	0+0	0	2+0	0
2	DF	(Scotland) SCO	Jack Grimmer	14	2	8+3	2	0+0	0	0+0	0	1+2	0
3	DF	(Scotland) SCO	Daniel Harvie	14	2	12+0	1	1+0	1	1+0	0	0+0	0
4	MF	(England) ENG	Josh Scowen	14	0	9+4	0	0+0	0	0+0	0	1+0	0
5	MF	(England) ENG	Aaron Morley	14	0	7+3	0	1+0	0	1+0	0	1+1	0
6	DF	(England) ENG	Taylor Allen	1	0	0+0	0	0+0	0	0+0	0	1+0	0
7	FW	(Guinea-Bissau) GBS	Junior Quitirna	9	1	1+4	0	0+0	0	0+1	0	3+0	1
8	MF	(Northern Ireland) NIR	Caolan Boyd-Munce	17	1	9+4	0	0+1	0	0+1	0	1+1	1
9	FW	(Switzerland) SUI	Bradley Fink	2	0	0+1	0	0+0	0	0+0	0	1+0	0
10	MF	(England) ENG	Luke Leahy	10	0	1+5	0	1+0	0	0+0	0	3+0	0
11	FW	(England) ENG	Silko Thomas	11	0	3+4	0	1+0	0	1+0	0	0+2	0
12	FW	(England) ENG	Cauley Woodrow	14	4	8+4	3	0+0	0	1+0	0	1+0	1
15	FW	(England) ENG	Jayden Wareham	10	6	9+0	6	0+1	0	0+0	0	0+0	0
17	DF	(Republic of Ireland) IRL	Dan Casey	12	2	5+3	2	1+0	0	0+0	0	3+0	0
19	FW	(England) ENG	Emre Tezgel	11	2	1+5	0	1+0	0	0+1	0	2+1	2
20	MF	(England) ENG	Ewan Henderson	13	2	9+2	1	0+0	0	1+0	1	0+1	0
21	MF	(Republic of Ireland) IRL	Jamie Mullins	8	0	3+1	0	0+1	0	1+0	0	2+0	0
22	MF	(Wales) WAL	Sam Parker	11	0	3+4	0	1+0	0	1+0	0	2+0	0
23	GK	(Northern Ireland) NIR	Conor Hazard	13	0	12+0	0	0+0	0	1+0	0	0+0	0
26	DF	(England) ENG	Connor Taylor	17	2	12+1	1	1+0	1	1+0	0	2+0	0
27	DF	(England) ENG	Steve Cook	8	0	7+0	0	0+0	0	1+0	0	0+0	0
28	FW	(England) ENG	Danny Ings	4	1	0+2	1	1+0	0	0+0	0	0+1	0
29	FW	(Jamaica) JAM	Malik Mothersille	7	1	3+1	0	1+0	0	0+0	0	2+0	1
33	GK	(England) ENG	Joe Wildsmith	3	0	1+0	0	1+0	0	0+0	0	1+0	0
44	MF	(Nigeria) NGR	Fred Onyedinma	14	4	13+0	4	0+0	0	1+0	0	0+0	0
45	DF	(Denmark) DEN	Anders Hagelskjær	10	0	7+0	0	0+1	0	0+0	0	2+0	0
47	FW	(England) ENG	Kaylan Hemmings	1	0	0+0	0	0+0	0	0+0	0	0+1	0
58	DF	(England) ENG	Jackson King	1	0	0+0	0	0+0	0	0+0	0	0+1	0
61	DF	(England) ENG	Mohamed Keita	2	1	0+0	0	0+0	0	0+0	0	1+1	1
67	FW	(Nigeria) NGR	Micah Olabiyi	1	0	0+0	0	0+0	0	0+0	0	1+0	0
68	MF	(England) ENG	Kyle Cross	3	0	0+0	0	0+1	0	0+0	0	0+2	0

=== Disciplinary record ===
As of match played 7 November 2026

Includes all competitive matches. The list is sorted by squad number when disciplinary points / points per card / number of cards are equal. Players with no cards not included in the list.

Rank	No.	Pos.	Nat.	Name	League One			FA Cup			EFL Cup			EFL Trophy			Total		
Rank	No.	Pos.	Nat.	Name	Yellow card	Second yellow card	Red card	Yellow card	Second yellow card	Red card	Yellow card	Second yellow card	Red card	Yellow card	Second yellow card	Red card	Yellow card	Second yellow card	Red card
1	20	CAM	(Scotland)	Ewan Henderson	5	0	0	0	0	0	1	0	0	0	0	0	6	0	0
2	3	LB	(Scotland)	Daniel Harvie	5	0	0	0	0	0	0	0	0	0	0	0	5	0	0
3	26	CB	(England)	Connor Taylor	0	0	0	1	0	0	0	0	0	1	0	0	2	0	0
3	44	RM	(Nigeria)	Fred Onyedinma	1	0	0	0	0	0	1	0	0	0	0	0	2	0	0
5	2	RB	(Scotland)	Jack Grimmer	1	0	0	0	0	0	0	0	0	0	0	0	1	0	0
5	5	CM	(England)	Aaron Morley	0	0	0	0	0	0	0	0	0	1	0	0	1	0	0
5	8	CM	(Northern Ireland)	Caolan Boyd-Munce	1	0	0	0	0	0	0	0	0	0	0	0	1	0	0
5	10	CM	(England)	Luke Leahy	0	0	0	0	0	0	0	0	0	1	0	0	1	0	0
5	12	CF	(England)	Cauley Woodrow	1	0	0	0	0	0	0	0	0	0	0	0	1	0	0
5	15	CF	(England)	Jayden Wareham	1	0	0	0	0	0	0	0	0	0	0	0	1	0	0
5	17	CB	(Republic of Ireland)	Dan Casey	1	0	0	0	0	0	0	0	0	0	0	0	1	0	0
5	29	LW	(Jamaica)	Malik Mothersille	1	0	0	0	0	0	0	0	0	0	0	0	1	0	0
Total					17	0	0	1	0	0	2	0	0	3	0	0	23	0	0

== Awards ==
=== Player awards ===
==== PFA League One Fans' Player of the Month ====
Month	Player	Result	Ref.
October	(Nigeria) Fred Onyedinma	Nominated	

=== Manager awards ===
==== EFL League One Manager of the Month ====
Month	Manager	Result	Ref.
September	(England) Tom Hounsell	Nominated	
