= 2026–27 Swansea City A.F.C. season =

Swansea City
2026–27 season
- Owner(s): Swansea Football LLC (71.18%); Nigel Morris (12.9%); Swansea City Supporters Society Ltd (6.98%)
- CEO: Tom Gorringe
- Head coach: Vítor Matos (until 18 November); Ashley Williams (interim; from 18 November)
- Stadium: Swansea.com Stadium
- EFL Cup: First round
- Top goalscorer: League: Adam Idah (4); All: Adam Idah (4)
- Highest home attendance: 20,973 (v. West Ham United, EFL Championship, 17 October 2026)
- Lowest home attendance: 11,283 (v. Birmingham City, EFL Cup, 8 August 2026)
- Average home league attendance: 18,167
- Biggest win: 3–0 (v. Derby County, EFL Championship, 29 August 2026)
- Biggest defeat: 3–1 (v. Southampton, EFL Championship, 8 September 2026)

The 2026–27 season is the 115th season in the history of Swansea City Association Football Club and their ninth consecutive season being in the Championship. In addition to the domestic league, the club would also participate in the FA Cup, and the EFL Cup.

== Transfers and contracts ==
=== In ===
Date	Pos.	Player	From	Fee	Ref.
1 July 2026 (Note: The transfer was announced on 10 June, and would become official on July 1 once Welsh's contract at Celtic expired.)	CB	(Scotland) Stephen Welsh	(Scotland) Celtic	Free	
1 July 2026	RW	(Mali) Moussa Yeo	(Austria) Red Bull Salzburg	Undisclosed	
9 July 2026	CM	(England) Staitham Bowen	(England) Brentford	Free	
15 July 2026	LW	(Wales) Joe Davies	(England) Peterborough United	Free	
22 July 2026	CAM	(New Zealand) Elijah Just	(Scotland) Motherwell	£5,000,000	
23 July 2026	LW	(Ghana) Joseph Opoku	(Belgium) Zulte Waregem	£6,000,000 (Note: A potential further £685,000 in add-ons)	
6 August 2026	CF	(Scotland) Ross Stewart	(England) Southampton	Free	
10 August 2026	CB	(England) Gregory Asemokhai	(England) Brentford	Free	
27 August 2026	CM	(Canada) Stephen Eustáquio	(Portugal) Porto	£3,400,000 (Note: A potential further £1,400,000 in add-ons)	
31 August 2026	CM	(England) Tom Iorpenda	(England) Huddersfield Town	£750,000 (Note: A potential further £250,000 in performance related add-ons.)	

=== Loaned in ===
Date	Pos.	Player	From	Loaned until	Ref.
3 August 2026	LB	(Portugal) Tiago Parente	(Portugal) Benfica	End of Season (Note: Option to make move permanent at the conclusion of the loan deal)	
27 August 2026	CB	(Netherlands) Jenson Seelt	(England) Sunderland	End of Season	
1 September 2026	LW	(England) Jeremy Monga	(England) Manchester City	End of Season	

=== Loaned out ===
Date	Pos.	Player	To	Loaned until	Ref.
23 June 2026	CF	(Wales) Morgan Bates	(Scotland) Inverness Caledonian Thistle	End of Season	
17 July 2026	CB	(Scotland) Blair McKenzie	(Republic of Ireland) Waterford	31 December 2026	
28 July 2026	RB	(Wales) Sam Parker	(England) Wycombe Wanderers	End of Season	
3 August 2026	CAM	(Wales) Ollie Cooper	(England) Notts County	End of Season (Note: Option to make the move permanent at the conclusion of the loan deal)	
14 August 2026	RW	(England) Josh Pescatore	(England) Buxton	End of Season	
20 August 2026	CF	(Scotland) Bobby Wales	(Scotland) Dundee	End of Season	
29 August 2026	CM	(Wales) Jacob Cook	(England) Hemel Hempstead Town	2 January 2027	
31 August 2026	CAM	(Finland) Leo Walta	(United States) Los Angeles	31 December 2026	
1 September 2026	RW	(France) Florian Bianchini	(France) Clermont Foot	End of Season	
2 September 2026	CM	(Wales) Daniel Watts	(England) Exeter City	End of Season	
11 September 2026	LW	(Sweden) Zeidane Inoussa	(Poland) Górnik Zabrze	End of Season	
30 September 2026	GK	(Wales) Tom Wright	(Wales) Ammanford	16 October 2026	
26 October 2026	CB	(Wales) Iestyn Jones	(Wales) Briton Ferry Llansawel	31 December 2026	

=== Out ===
Date	Pos.	Player	To	Fee	Ref.
19 June 2026	CB	(Cape Verde) Ricardo Santos	(England) Sheffield Wednesday	Undisclosed	
1 July 2026	CM	(Northern Ireland) Ethan Galbraith	(England) Stoke City	£10,000,000	
31 July 2026	CAM	(Wales) Liam Cullen	(England) Leicester City	Undisclosed	
3 August 2026	RW	(Wales) Cameron Congreve	(Belgium) Westerlo	Undisclosed	
5 August 2026	RW	(England) Kyrell Wilson	(Belgium) Gent	Undisclosed	
3 September 2026	CM	(Wales) Joel Cotterill	(Scotland) St Johnstone	Undisclosed	

=== Released/Out of contract ===
Date	Pos.	Player	Subsequent club	Join date	Ref.
30 June 2026	CF	(Wales) Josh Thomas	(England) Fleetwood Town	1 July 2026	
30 June 2026	GK	(Wales) Kit Margetson	(England) Manchester United	27 July 2026	
30 June 2026	LB	(England) Wahab Ojetoro	(England) Millwall	1 September 2026	
30 June 2026	GK	(Scotland) Evan Anderson			
30 June 2026	CM	(Wales) Mitchell Bates	(Republic of Ireland) Galway United	31 July 2026	
30 June 2026	CDM	(Wales) Callum Deacon			
30 June 2026	GK	(Wales) Isaac Dudding	(Wales) Pontardawe Town	1 July 2026	
30 June 2026	CB	(Wales) Ben Phillips	(Wales) Haverfordwest County	1 July 2026	
30 June 2026	CB	(Wales) Brogan Popham			

=== New contract ===
Date	Pos.	Player	Contract until	Ref.
8 May 2026	GK	(England) Paul Farman	30 June 2027	
29 May 2026	CM	(Wales) Jacob Cook	30 June 2029	
1 July 2026 (Note: The contract agreement was announced on 14 May, and would come into effect on July 1.)	CM	(Wales) Harlan Perry	30 June 2028 (Note: First professional contract)	
2 July 2026	CM	(Wales) Callum Jones	30 June 2028	
6 July 2026	CB	(Wales) Caio Ifans	30 June 2027	
14 July 2026	CM	(Wales) Milo Robinson	30 June 2028	
29 July 2026	CB	(Wales) Carter Heywood	30 June 2029	
3 August 2026	RW	(Wales) Billy Clarke	30 June 2027	

== Pre-season and friendlies ==
On 2 July, Swans announced three pre-season fixtures against Holstein Kiel, VfL Bochum and Udinese during a training camp in Austria, and Leganés.

Win Draw Loss Fixtures

18 July 2026 Friendly	Swansea City	2–2	Holstein Kiel	Kufstein, Austria
16:30 CEST	Ronald 6'; Idah 45'	Report	Zec 19'; Alidou 58'	Stadium: Kufstein Arena

21 July 2026 Friendly	VfL Bochum	2–0	Swansea City	Mittersill, Austria
18:00 CEST	Crimaldi 24'; Taz 45'	Report		Stadium: Fussballplatz Mittersill

24 July 2026 Friendly	Swansea City	2–0	Udinese	Mittersill, Austria
13:00 CEST	Cullen 6'; Just 88'			Stadium: Fussballplatz Mittersill

1 August 2026 Friendly	Swansea City	1–0	Leganés	Landore
15:00 BST	Opoku 43'			Stadium: Swansea.com Stadium; Attendance: 4,979

== Competitions ==
=== Overall record ===
Competition	First match	Last match	Starting round	Final position	Record							
Competition	First match	Last match	Starting round	Final position	Pld	W	D	L	GF	GA	GD	Win %
Championship	15 August 2026	1 May 2027	Matchday 1	TBD	16	8	3	5	24	20	+4	50.00
FA Cup	January 2027	TBD	Third round	TBD	0	0	0	0	0	0	+0	—
EFL Cup	8 August 2026	8 August 2026	First round	First round	1	0	0	1	0	1	−1	0.00
Total					17	8	3	6	24	21	+3	47.06

Last updated: 21 November 2026
Source: Soccerway

=== Championship ===
==== League table ====
Pos	Team	Pld	W	D	L	GF	GA	GD	Pts	Promotion, qualification or relegation
6	Southampton	16	9	4	3	31	15	+16	27 (Note: Southampton were deducted four points due to multiple breaches of EFL regulations related to the unauthorised filming of other clubs' training.)	Qualification for Championship play-off quarter-finals
7	Queens Park Rangers	16	7	6	3	25	18	+7	27	Qualification for Championship play-off quarter-finals
8	Swansea City	16	8	3	5	24	20	+4	27	Qualification for Championship play-off quarter-finals
9	Sheffield United	16	7	4	5	25	19	+6	25	
10	West Ham United	16	6	6	4	38	24	+14	24	

Updated to match(es) played on 22 November 2026. Source: EFL Official Website
Rules for classification: 1) Points; 2) Goal difference; 3) Number of goals scored; 4) Head-to-head results; 5) Wins; 6) Away goals; 7) Penalty points (sec 9.5); 8) Number of 12-point sending off offences; 9) Play-off (only if needed to determine promotion/relegation)

==== Results summary ====
Overall								Home						Away					
Pld	W	D	L	GF	GA	GD	Pts	W	D	L	GF	GA	GD	W	D	L	GF	GA	GD
16	8	3	5	24	20	+4	27	4	3	1	13	5	+8	4	0	4	11	15	−4

Last updated: 21 November 2026.
Source: Soccerway

==== Results by round ====
Round	1	2	3	4	5	6	7	8	9	10	11	12	13	14	15	16	17	18	19	20	21	22	23	24	25	26	27	28	29	30	31	32	33	34
Ground	A	H	A	H	H	A	H	A	H	A	H	A	H	A	A	H	A	H	A	H	A	H	A	H	H	A	A	H	H	A	A	H	H	A
Result	W	D	W	W	D	L	W	W	W	W	L	L	W	L	L	D																		
Position	3	8	3	1	1	3	2	1	1	1	1	2	2	5	6	8																		
Points	3	4	7	10	11	11	14	17	20	23	23	23	26	26	26	27																		

Source: Soccerway
A = Away; H = Home; W = Win; D = Draw; L = Loss

==== Matches ====
On 25 June, the Championship fixtures were revealed.

Win Draw Loss Fixtures

15 August 2026 1	Stoke City	1–2	Swansea City	Stoke-on-Trent
15:00 BST	Bocat 10'; Graham (yellow card) 36'	Report	Opoku 22'; Lissah (yellow card) 53'; Idah 66'; Widell (yellow card) 86'; Tymon (yellow card) 90+1'	Stadium: bet365 Stadium; Attendance: 24,332 (2,765 away); Referee: Oliver Langford

22 August 2026 2	Swansea City	0–0	Sheffield United	Swansea
15:00 BST	Fulton (yellow card) 59'; Lissah (yellow card) 90+5'	Report	Burrows (yellow card) 24'; Tanganga (yellow card) 72'	Stadium: Swansea.com Stadium; Attendance: 17,710; Referee: Tom Nield

29 August 2026 3	Derby County	0–3	Swansea City	Derby
12:30 BST	Langås (yellow card) 69'; Sanderson (yellow card) 79'; Travis (yellow card) 81'	Report	Opoku 2'; Eom Ji-sung 44'; Stamenić (yellow card) 73'; Just (yellow card) 84'; Ronald 90+1'	Stadium: Pride Park Stadium; Attendance: 26,576; Referee: David Webb
Note: Fixture was initially scheduled for a 15:00 kick-off, but was brought forward for live Sky Sports broadcasting.

1 September 2026 4	Swansea City	2–0	Watford	Swansea
19:45 BST	Eom Ji-sung 8'; Idah 29'		Traoré (yellow card) 25'; Kyprianou (yellow card) 68'; Keben (yellow card) 80'; Zemura (yellow card) 90+1'	Stadium: Swansea.com Stadium; Attendance: 16,195; Referee: Edward Duckworth

5 September 2026 5	Swansea City	0–0	Wrexham	Swansea
20:00 BST	Opoku (yellow card) 67'; Cabango (yellow card) 77'; Welsh (yellow card) 88'	Report		Stadium: Swansea.com Stadium; Attendance: 20,056; Referee: Elliot Bell
Note: Fixture was initially scheduled for a 15:00 kick-off, but was pushed back for live Sky Sports broadcasting.

8 September 2026 6	Southampton	3–1	Swansea City	Southampton
19:45 BST	Azaz 9'; Larin 33'; Scienza 78'	Report	Vipotnik 52'	Stadium: St Mary's Stadium; Attendance: 27,299; Referee: Lewis Smith

12 September 2026 7	Swansea City	3–1	Burnley	Swansea
15:00 BST	Idah 13'; Yeo 33', (yellow card) 59'; Vipotnik 68'; Lissah (yellow card) 72'	Report	Ramazani 58'; Pires (yellow card) 59'	Stadium: Swansea.com Stadium; Attendance: 16,390; Referee: James Bell

19 September 2026 8	Lincoln City	1–2	Swansea City	Lincoln
15:00 BST	House (yellow card) 6'; Towler (yellow card) 25'; Hackett 39' (pen.)	Report	Yeo 47'; Eustáquio 51'; Lissah (yellow card) 90'	Stadium: LNER Stadium; Attendance: 10,559; Referee: Anthony Backhouse

10 October 2026 9	Swansea City	2–1	Norwich City	Swansea
12:30 BST	Fulton (yellow card) 22'; Yeo 49'; Idah 59'	Report	Wright 28'; Mattsson (yellow card) 58'	Stadium: Swansea.com Stadium; Attendance: 17,677 (770 away); Referee: Andrew Kitchen
Note: Fixture was initially scheduled for a 15:00 kick-off, but was brought forward for live Sky Sports broadcasting.

13 October 2026 10	Millwall	0–1	Swansea City	Bermondsey
19:45 BST	Mazou-Sacko (yellow card) 23'; Dykes (yellow card) 44'; Sturge (yellow card) 51'		Fulton (yellow card) 15'; Lissah (yellow card) 83'; Ronald 90'	Stadium: The Den; Referee: Edward Duckworth

17 October 2026 11	Swansea City	0–1	West Ham United	Swansea
15:00 BST			Mukasa 34', (yellow card) 41'; Castellanos (yellow card) 81'	Stadium: Swansea.com Stadium; Attendance: 20,973; Referee: Josh Smith

24 October 2026 12	Queens Park Rangers	5–0	Swansea City	Shepherd's Bush
15:00 BST	Kone 2', 9', 15', (yellow card) 16'; Dunne 45+1', 86'; Smyth (yellow card) 59'	Report	Vigouroux (yellow card) 14'; Just (yellow card) 34'; Stamenić (yellow card) 54'	Stadium: MATRADE Loftus Road; Referee: Sam Allison

31 October 2026 13	Swansea City	4–0	Blackburn Rovers	Swansea
15:00 GMT	Eustáquio 11'; Opoku 32'; Lissah 36'; Stewart 59'	Report	Baradji (yellow card) 22'	Stadium: Swansea.com Stadium; Attendance: 16,867; Referee: Gavin Ward

3 November 2026 14	Portsmouth	3–1	Swansea City	Milton
19:45 GMT	Adams (yellow card) 21'; Devlin 36', 90+2'; Poole (yellow card) 83'; Waddingham 98'	Report	Vipotnik 85' (pen.)	Stadium: Fratton Park; Attendance: 18,897; Referee: Matthew Corlett

7 November 2026 15	Birmingham City	2–1	Swansea City	Bordesley
15:00 GMT	Stansfield 29', (yellow card) 54', (goal) 87'; Laird (yellow card) 55'	Report	Stamenić (red card) 26'; Stewart (yellow card) 42'; Fulton (yellow card) 49'; Klarer 65' (o.g.)	Stadium: St Andrew's @ Knighthead Park; Attendance: 28,005; Referee: Anthony Backhouse

21 November 2026 16	Swansea City	2–2	West Bromwich Albion	Swansea
15:00 GMT	Yeo 16'; Just 45+4'; Tymon (yellow card) 45'; Cabango (yellow card) 56'; Opoku (yellow card) 63'; Eustáquio (yellow card) 69'; Lissah (yellow card) 73'		Price 7'; Nzingoula 38', (yellow card) 67'; Pereira (yellow card) 47'; Mepham (yellow card) 61'	Stadium: Swansea.com Stadium; Attendance: 18,092; Referee: Thomas Kirk

24 November 2026 17	Middlesbrough	v	Swansea City	Middlesbrough
19:45 GMT				Stadium: Riverside Stadium

29 November 2026 18	Swansea City	v	Cardiff City	Swansea
12:00 GMT				Stadium: Swansea.com Stadium
Note: Fixture was initially scheduled for a 15:00 kick-off, but was brought forward for live Sky Sports broadcasting.

5 December 2026 19	Bristol City	v	Swansea City	Ashton Gate
12:30 GMT				Stadium: Ashton Gate Stadium
Note: Fixture was initially scheduled for a 15:00 kick-off, but was brought forward following advice from Avon and Somerset Police.

8 December 2026 20	Swansea City	v	Bolton Wanderers	Swansea
19:45 GMT				Stadium: Swansea.com Stadium

12 December 2026 21	Charlton Athletic	v	Swansea City	Charlton
15:00 GMT				Stadium: The Valley

19 December 2026 22	Swansea City	v	Preston North End	Swansea
12:30 GMT				Stadium: Swansea.com Stadium
Note: Fixture was initially scheduled for a 15:00 kick-off, but was brought forward for live Sky Sports broadcasting.

26 December 2026 23	Wolverhampton Wanderers	v	Swansea City	Wolverhampton
15:00 GMT				Stadium: Molineux Stadium

29 December 2026 24	Swansea City	v	Queens Park Rangers	Swansea
19:45 GMT				Stadium: Swansea.com Stadium

1 January 2027 25	Swansea City	v	Charlton Athletic	Swansea
15:00 GMT				Stadium: Swansea.com Stadium

15 January 2027 26	West Ham United	v	Swansea City	Stratford
20:00 GMT				Stadium: London Stadium
Note: Fixture was initially scheduled for 16 January, but was brought forward to the night before for live Sky Sports broadcasting.

23 January 2027 27	Blackburn Rovers	v	Swansea City	Blackburn
15:00 GMT				Stadium: Ewood Park

27 January 2027 28	Swansea City	v	Portsmouth	Swansea
20:00 GMT				Stadium: Swansea.com Stadium
Note: Fixture was initially scheduled for a 19:45 kick-off, but was pushed back fifteen minutes for live Sky Sports broadcasting.

30 January 2027 29	Swansea City	v	Birmingham City	Swansea
12:30 GMT				Stadium: Swansea.com Stadium
Note: Fixture was initially scheduled for a 15:00 kick-off, but was brought forward for live Sky Sports broadcasting.

6 February 2027 30	West Bromwich Albion	v	Swansea City	West Bromwich
15:00 GMT				Stadium: The Hawthorns

13 February 2027 31	Burnley	v	Swansea City	Burnley
15:00 GMT				Stadium: Turf Moor

17 February 2027 32	Swansea City	v	Millwall	Swansea
19:45 GMT				Stadium: Swansea.com Stadium

20 February 2027 33	Swansea City	v	Lincoln City	Swansea
15:00 GMT				Stadium: Swansea.com Stadium

27 February 2027 34	Norwich City	v	Swansea City	Norwich
12:30 GMT				Stadium: Carrow Road
Note: Fixture was initially scheduled for a 15:00 kick-off, but was brought forward for live Sky Sports broadcasting.

=== FA Cup ===
Win Draw Loss Fixtures

=== EFL Cup ===
Swansea were drawn at home to Birmingham City in the first round.

Win Draw Loss Fixtures

8 August 2026 First round	Swansea City	0–1	Birmingham City	Landore
15:00 BST	Widell (yellow card) 21'; Burgess (yellow card) 62'	Report	Priske 44'	Stadium: Swansea.com Stadium; Attendance: 11,283; Referee: Ruebyn Ricardo

== Statistics ==
=== Appearances and goals ===
As of match played 21 November 2026

Players with no appearances are not included on the list; italics indicate a loaned in player

No.	Pos	Nat	Player	Total		Championship		FA Cup		EFL Cup	
No.	Pos	Nat	Player	Apps	Goals	Apps	Goals	Apps	Goals	Apps	Goals
2	DF	(England) ENG	Joshua Key	11	0	4+6	0	0+0	0	0+1	0
3	DF	(Netherlands) NED	Jenson Seelt	7	0	3+4	0	0+0	0	0+0	0
4	MF	(Scotland) SCO	Jay Fulton	16	0	12+3	0	0+0	0	0+1	0
5	DF	(Wales) WAL	Ben Cabango	15	0	12+2	0	0+0	0	1+0	0
6	MF	(New Zealand) NZL	Marko Stamenić	15	0	12+2	0	0+0	0	1+0	0
7	MF	(Sweden) SWE	Melker Widell	17	0	9+7	0	0+0	0	1+0	0
8	FW	(New Zealand) NZL	Elijah Just	16	1	9+6	1	0+0	0	1+0	0
9	FW	(Slovenia) SLO	Žan Vipotnik	17	3	3+13	3	0+0	0	0+1	0
10	FW	(South Korea) KOR	Eom Ji-sung	13	2	6+6	2	0+0	0	0+1	0
14	DF	(England) ENG	Josh Tymon	17	0	16+0	0	0+0	0	1+0	0
15	DF	(Australia) AUS	Cameron Burgess	1	0	0+0	0	0+0	0	1+0	0
17	MF	(Portugal) POR	Gonçalo Franco	9	0	4+5	0	0+0	0	0+0	0
20	DF	(Portugal) POR	Tiago Parente	1	0	0+1	0	0+0	0	0+0	0
21	MF	(Finland) FIN	Leo Walta	2	0	0+1	0	0+0	0	0+1	0
22	GK	(Chile) CHI	Lawrence Vigouroux	17	0	16+0	0	0+0	0	1+0	0
23	DF	(Scotland) SCO	Stephen Welsh	15	0	14+1	0	0+0	0	0+0	0
26	DF	(Czech Republic) CZE	Filip Lissah	16	1	14+1	1	0+0	0	1+0	0
30	FW	(Ghana) GHA	Joseph Opoku	16	3	11+4	3	0+0	0	1+0	0
31	FW	(Scotland) SCO	Ross Stewart	5	1	2+3	1	0+0	0	0+0	0
33	FW	(Republic of Ireland) IRL	Adam Idah	15	4	11+3	4	0+0	0	1+0	0
35	FW	(Brazil) BRA	Ronald	6	2	1+5	2	0+0	0	0+0	0
46	MF	(Canada) CAN	Stephen Eustáquio	10	2	6+4	2	0+0	0	0+0	0
49	FW	(Mali) MLI	Moussa Yeo	14	4	11+2	4	0+0	0	1+0	0

== Awards ==
=== Manager awards ===
==== EFL Championship Manager of the Month ====
Month	Manager	Result	Ref.
August	(Portugal) Vítor Matos	Won	
September	(Portugal) Vítor Matos	Nominated	
