= Cameron Stones =

Cameron Stones may refer to:

- Cam Stones (born 1992), Canadian bobsledder
- Cameron Stones (footballer) (born 2008), English footballer
