= Marko Stamenić =

New Zealand footballer (born 2002)

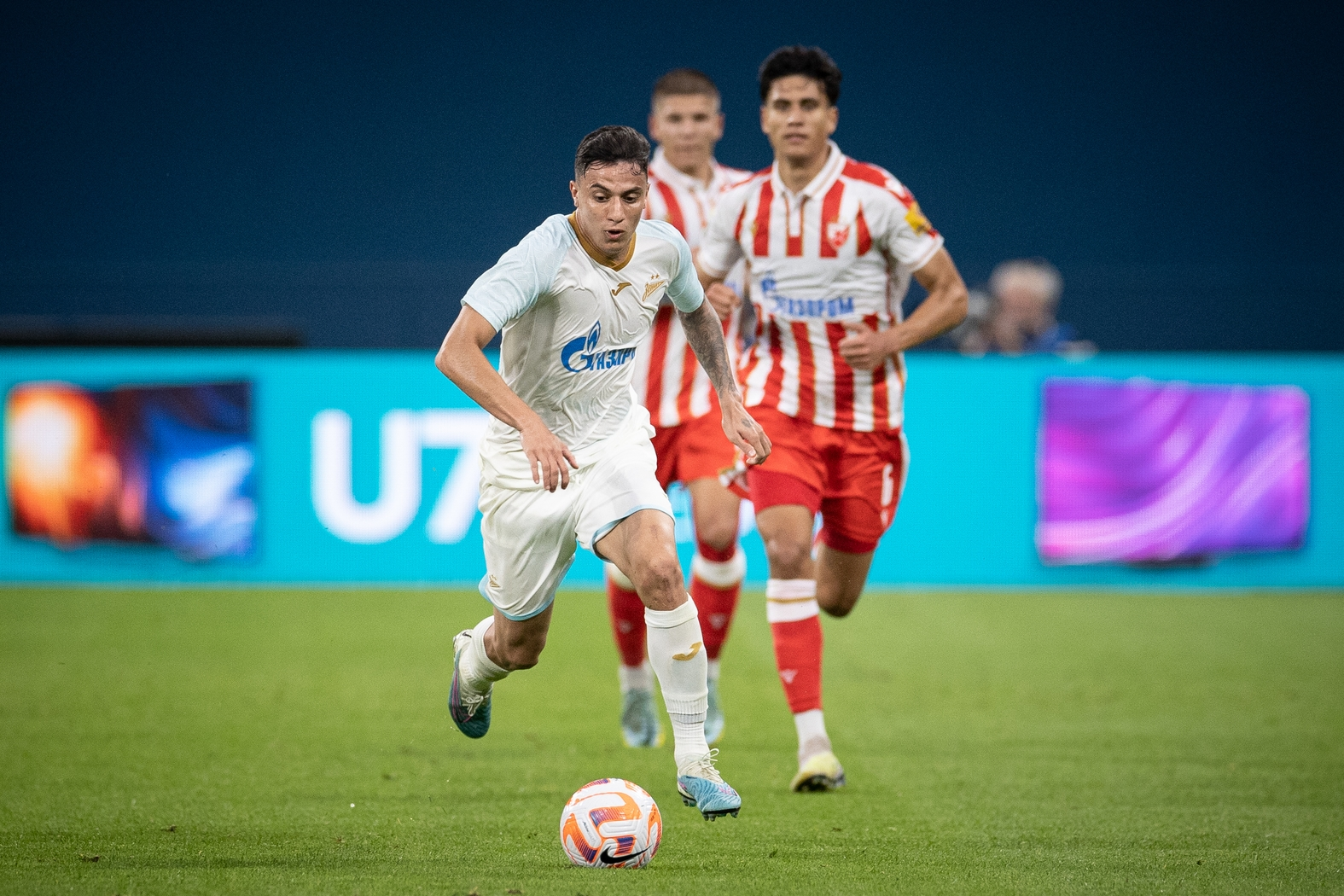
- Stamenić (right) with Red Star Belgrade in 2023

Personal information
- Full name: Marko Seufatu Nikola Stamenić
- Date of birth: 19 February 2002 (age 24)
- Place of birth: Wellington, New Zealand
- Height: 1.88 m (6 ft 2 in)
- Position: Midfielder

Team information
- Current team: Swansea City
- Number: 6

Youth career
- –2013: Stokes Valley
- 2014–2016: Western Suburbs

Senior career*
Years	Team	Apps	(Gls)
2017–2020	Western Suburbs	34	(7)
2019–2020	Team Wellington	7	(1)
2020–2023	Copenhagen	16	(0)
2021–2022	→ HB Køge (loan)	23	(2)
2023–2024	Red Star Belgrade	27	(1)
2024–2025	Nottingham Forest	0	(0)
2024–2025	→ Olympiacos (loan)	14	(0)
2025–	Swansea City	48	(3)

International career^{‡}
2018–2019	New Zealand U17	10	(0)
2021	New Zealand Olympic	3	(0)
2021–	New Zealand	46	(4)
- * Club domestic league appearances and goals as of 24 October 2026 ‡ National team caps and goals as of 5 October 2026

Marko Seufatu Nikola Stamenić (Serbian Cyrillic: Марко Сеуфату Никола Стаменић; born 19 February 2002) is a New Zealand professional footballer who plays as a midfielder for EFL Championship club Swansea City and the New Zealand national team.

Born in Wellington and raised in Stokes Valley, Stamenić graduated from the Olé Football Academy and signed for FC Copenhagen in September 2020 following extended trials. Following sporadic appearances for the club, including in the UEFA Champions League, Stamenić departed to join Red Star Belgrade in 2023.

== Club career ==
=== Western Suburbs ===
Born in Wellington, Stamenić attended St Patrick's College, Silverstream, Wellington. and came through the ranks of the Olé Football Academy. During this time, Stamenić played for Olé-affiliated club Western Suburbs in the Central Premier League, making his debut in 2017 and reaching the final of the 2018 Chatham Cup.

=== Team Wellington ===
Following Olé's affiliation with ISPS Handa Premiership side Team Wellington, Stamenić signed for them on 2 October 2019. He made seven league appearances, scoring one goal on 15 December 2019 against Southern United.

=== Copenhagen ===
Following his standout performances for New Zealand in the 2019 FIFA U-17 World Cup, and despite interest from Brazilian Série A club Flamengo, Stamenić was invited for a three-week trial at Danish Superliga side FC Copenhagen in March 2020. However, following an order from the New Zealand Government for all foreign-based New Zealand citizens to urgently return to the country in response to the COVID-19 pandemic, he was forced to abort the trial. FC Copenhagen retained their interest, and Stamenić eventually returned to Denmark, signing for the club's under-19 team on 1 September 2020.

Stamenić made his debut for the first team on 23 November 2020, starting in a 2–1 Superliga loss to Randers FC.

On 9 January 2023, Copenhagen announced they would not be extending his contract, which expired in June 2023, as Stamenić had elected to explore other opportunities.

=== Red Star Belgrade ===
On 6 February 2023, Red Star Belgrade (Crvena zvezda) announced that they had signed Stamenić on a four-year deal beginning the next season.

=== Nottingham Forest ===
On 21 June 2024, Stamenić signed for English Premier League side Nottingham Forest on a five-year deal, immediately joining Super League Greece side Olympiacos on a season-long loan deal.

=== Swansea City ===
On 20 August 2025, Stamenić departed Nottingham Forest without making a competitive appearance, joining EFL Championship club Swansea City for an undisclosed fee, reported to be over £2 million. On 6 December 2025, he scored his first goal for the club at home to Oxford. On 31 January 2026, Stamenić scored and got an assist in a 2–0 win away to Watford.

== International career ==
=== Under-17 ===
Stamenić made his first appearance for the New Zealand U-17 team coming off the bench in their 0–5 loss to the Solomon Islands at the 2018 OFC U-16 Championship. He then followed that up starting in New Zealand's next matches against Papua New Guinea in the last pool game, Tahiti in the semi-finals and in the final which saw a rematch against the Solomon Islands that New Zealand won 5–4 on penalties.

Stamenić played all three games for New Zealand in their 2019 FIFA U-17 World Cup campaign, finishing third in their group.

=== Senior ===
On 25 June 2021, Stamenić was called up to the New Zealand squad for the delayed 2020 Summer Olympics.

Stamenić made his international debut with the senior New Zealand national team in a 2–1 friendly win over Curaçao on 9 October 2021.

On 14 May 2026, Stamenić was selected in the 26-man squad for the 2026 FIFA World Cup.

== Personal life ==
Stamenić was born in New Zealand to a Serbian father from Novi Sad and a Samoan mother.

== Career statistics ==
=== Club ===
As of 28 August 2026

Appearances and goals by club, season and competition
Club	Season	League			National cup (Note: Includes Danish Cup, Serbian Cup, Greek Football Cup, FA Cup)		League cup (Note: Includes EFL Cup)		Europe		Total	
Club	Season	Division	Apps	Goals	Apps	Goals	Apps	Goals	Apps	Goals	Apps	Goals
Team Wellington	2019–20	NZ Premiership	7	1	—		—		—		7	1
Copenhagen	2020–21	Danish Superliga	1	0	0	0	—		0	0	1	0
Copenhagen	2021–22	Danish Superliga	0	0	0	0	—		0	0	0	0
Copenhagen	2022–23	Danish Superliga	15	0	1	0	—		4 (Note: Appearances in UEFA Champions League)	0	20	0
Copenhagen	Total		16	0	1	0	0	0	4	0	21	0
HB Køge (loan)	2021–22	Danish 1st Division	23	2	0	0	—		—		23	2
Red Star Belgrade	2023–24	Serbian SuperLiga	27	1	4	0	—		4	1	35	2
Nottingham Forest	2024–25	Premier League	0	0	0	0	0	0	—		0	0
Olympiacos (loan)	2024–25	Super League Greece	14	0	5	0	—		4 (Note: Appearances in UEFA Europa League)	0	23	0
Swansea City	2025–26	Championship	36	3	1	0	1	0	—		38	3
Swansea City	2026–27	Championship	3	0	0	0	1	0	—		4	0
Swansea City	Total		39	3	1	0	2	0	4	0	42	0
Career total			126	7	11	0	1	0	12	1	151	8

=== International ===
As of match played on 5 October 2026
Scores and results list New Zealand's goal tally first, score column indicates score after each Stamenić goal.

List of international goals scored by Marko Stamenić
No.	Date	Venue	Opponent	Score	Result	Competition
—	19 June 2023	Sonnensee Stadium, Ritzing, Austria	Qatar	1–0	1–0 (Note: Michael Boxall was racially abused during the first half of the game by a Qatari player. No official action was taken so the team agreed not to come out for the second half of the match.)	Friendly
1	18 November 2024	Mount Smart Stadium, Auckland, New Zealand	Samoa	5–0	8–0	2026 FIFA World Cup qualification
2	10 June 2025	BMO Field, Toronto, Canada	Ukraine	1–1	1–2	2025 Canadian Shield
3	1 October 2026	Nissan Stadium, Yokohama, Japan	Panama	1–0	1–1 (5–3 p)	2026 Kirin Cup Soccer

== Honours ==
Western Suburbs

- Central League: 2017, 2019
- Chatham Cup runner-up: 2018

Copenhagen

- Danish Superliga: 2022–23
- Danish Cup: 2022–23

Red Star Belgrade

- Serbian SuperLiga: 2023–24
- Serbian Cup: 2023–24

Olympiacos

- Super League Greece: 2024–25
- Greek Football Cup: 2024–25
