= Sam Parker (footballer) =

Welsh association football player

Personal information
- Full name: Samuel David Parker
- Date of birth: 7 July 2006 (age 20)
- Place of birth: Cardiff, Wales
- Height: 1.78 m (5 ft 10 in)
- Positions: Right-back; right winger

Team information
- Current team: Wycombe Wanderers (on loan from Swansea City)
- Number: 22

Youth career
- –2023: Swansea City

Senior career*
Years	Team	Apps	(Gls)
2023–	Swansea City	13	(0)
2026–	→ Wycombe Wanderers (loan)	7	(0)

International career^{‡}
2023–	Wales U17	2	(0)
2025–	Wales U19	2	(0)
2025–	Wales U21	3	(0)
- * Club domestic league appearances and goals as of 00:08, 10 October 2026 (UTC) ‡ National team caps and goals as of 00:15 (UTC) 10 October 2025

Samuel David Parker (born 7 July 2006) is a Welsh footballer who plays as a right-back or right winger for EFL League One club Wycombe Wanderers, on loan from EFL Championship side Swansea City. He is a Wales Under-21 International.

== Career ==
Born in Cardiff, Parker progressed through the academy at Swansea City having joined the club at eight years-old. He signed his first professional contract aged 17 years-old in August 2023, agreeing to a three-year deal.

Parker made his debut for the Swansea City senior side in December 2023 in the EFL Championship, in a 2–2 draw away against Coventry City. After his debut, manager Alan Sheehan praised him, saying "He's 17 years of age…I've liked him from the minute I came into the club. I've seen him in the academy and I just think if you're good enough, you're old enough". In April 2024, manager Luke Williams admitted that the club and player were "quite a long way apart" in contract negotiations with Parker having turned down a new deal. On 29 August 2024, Parker signed a new four-year contract with the club.

On 28 July 2026, Parker signed for EFL League One club Wycombe Wanderers on a season-long loan.

== International career ==
In 2023, he was called up by Wales U17. He made his debut for Wales U17 in February 2023 against Israel U17, and made his first start shortly afterwards at the 2023 UEFA European Under-17 Championship against Ireland U17. On 6 June 2025 Parker made his Wales under-21 debut in a friendly match against Norway.

== Career statistics ==
As of 21 April 2026

Appearances and goals by club, season and competition
Club	Season	League			FA Cup		League Cup		Other		Total	
Club	Season	Division	Apps	Goals	Apps	Goals	Apps	Goals	Apps	Goals	Apps	Goals
Swansea City	2023–24	Championship	2	0	1	0	0	0	—		3	0
Swansea City	2024–25	Championship	7	0	0	0	0	0	—		7	0
Swansea City	2025–26	Championship	4	0	0	0	2	0	—		6	0
Swansea City	2026–27	Championship	0	0	0	0	0	0	—		0	0
Swansea City	Total		13	0	1	0	2	0	0	0	16	0
Wycombe Wanderers (loan)	2026–27	League One	0	0	0	0	0	0	0	0	0	0
Career total			13	0	1	0	2	0	0	0	16	0
