= Joseph Opoku =

Ghanaian footballer (born 2005)

Personal information
- Full name: Joseph Amankwaah Opoku
- Date of birth: 8 August 2005 (age 21)
- Place of birth: Ghana
- Height: 1.72 m (5 ft 8 in)
- Position: Winger

Team information
- Current team: Swansea City
- Number: 30

Youth career
- Great Corinthians FC

Senior career*
Years	Team	Apps	(Gls)
2024	Jong Essevee	1	(0)
2024–2026	Zulte Waregem	59	(13)
2026–	Swansea City	12	(3)

International career^{‡}
2025	Ghana U20	4	(1)
2026–	Ghana	1	(0)
- * Club domestic league appearances and goals as of 20:24, 31 October 2026 (UTC) ‡ National team caps and goals as of 22 May 2026

Joseph Amankwaah Opoku (born 8 August 2005) is a Ghanaian professional footballer who plays as a winger for EFL Championship club Swansea City and the Ghana national team.

== Club career ==
=== Zulte Waregem ===
A youth product of the Ghanaian club Great Corinthians FC, Opoku joined Zulte Waregem on 30 August 2024 on a 2-year contract. He helped Zulte Waregem win the 2024–25 Challenger Pro League and earned promotion to the Belgian Pro League. On 25 July 2025, he extended his contract for 2 more years, with an option to extend for 2 additional years. He was named the "Jupiler Pro League Player of the Month" for April 2026.

=== Swansea City ===
On 23 July 2026, Opoku signed for Swansea City in the EFL Championship on a 4-year contract with an option for a further 12 months. Opoku scored his first goal for the club on 16 August 2026 against Stoke City in an opening day victory.

== International career ==
Opoku was part of the Ghana U20s at the 2025 U-20 Africa Cup of Nations. He was called up to the senior Ghana national team for a set of friendlies in May 2026.

== Career statistics ==
As of match played 2 September 2026

Appearances and goals by club, season and competition
Club	Season	League			National cup (Note: Includes Belgian Cup, FA Cup)		League cup (Note: Includes EFL Cup)		Other		Total	
Club	Season	Division	Apps	Goals	Apps	Goals	Apps	Goals	Apps	Goals	Apps	Goals
Zulte Waregem	2024–25	Challenger Pro League	26	3	1	0	—		—		27	3
Zulte Waregem	2025–26	Belgian Pro League	33	10	1	0	—		—		34	10
Zulte Waregem	Total		59	13	2	0	—		—		61	13
Swansea City	2026–27	EFL Championship	4	2	0	0	1	0	—		5	2
Career total			63	15	2	0	1	0	0	0	66	15

== Honours ==
Zulte Waregem

- Challenger Pro League: 2024–25

Individual

- Belgian Pro League Player of the Month: April 2026
