= Filip Lissah =

Czech-English footballer (born 2004)

Personal information
- Full name: Filip Augustus Lissah
- Date of birth: 8 December 2004 (age 21)
- Place of birth: London, England
- Height: 1.82 m (6 ft 0 in)
- Position: Defender

Team information
- Current team: Swansea City
- Number: 26

Youth career
- –2021: Chelsea
- 2021–2023: Swansea City

Senior career*
Years	Team	Apps	(Gls)
2023–	Swansea City	12	(1)
2025–2026	→ Falkirk (loan)	27	(2)

International career^{‡}
2026–	Czech Republic U21	3	(1)
- * Club domestic league appearances and goals as of 00:37, 1 November 2026 (UTC) ‡ National team caps and goals as of 25 September 2026

Filip Augustus Lissah (born 8 December 2004) is a professional footballer who plays as a defender for EFL Championship club Swansea City. Born in England, he has represented the Czech Republic at youth level.

== Early life ==
Lissah was born on 8 December 2004 in England. Of Barbadian and Czech descent through his parents, he grew up in Kingston upon Thames, England.

== Club career ==
=== Swansea City ===
Lissah started his career with Chelsea, before joining Swansea City in the summer of 2021. He signed his first professional contract with Swansea City on 5 December 2022, penning a deal until 2025. He made his professional debut for the club on 25 January 2024, in a 5–0 defeat to Bournemouth in the FA Cup. On 27 March 2024, he signed a new three-year contract with the club until 2027.

On 1 September 2025, Lissah joined Scottish Premiership side Falkirk on a season-long loan. He made his debut for the club on 27 September 2025, in a 3–0 defeat to Hearts. He scored his first goal for the club on 3 January 2026, in a 1–0 win against Aberdeen.

Lissah made his league debut with Swansea City on 15 August 2026, in a 2–1 win against Stoke City in the Championship.

== International career ==
Lissah is a Czech Republic youth international. During the spring of 2026, he played for the Czech Republic national under-21 football team for 2027 UEFA European Under-21 Championship qualification.

== Style of play ==
Lissah plays as a defender. Scottish newspaper The Scotsman wrote in 2026 that "despite being a defender, he has the ability to create... he's defensively strong too".

== Career statistics ==
As of match played 31 October 2026

Appearances and goals by club, season and competition
Club	Season	League			National Cup (Note: Includes FA Cup, Scottish Cup)		League Cup (Note: Includes EFL Cup, Scottish League Cup)		Other		Total	
Club	Season	Division	Apps	Goals	Apps	Goals	Apps	Goals	Apps	Goals	Apps	Goals
Swansea City	2023–24	Championship	0	0	1	0	0	0	—		1	0
Swansea City	2024–25	Championship	0	0	0	0	0	0	—		0	0
Swansea City	2025–26	Championship	0	0	0	0	0	0	—		0	0
Swansea City	2026–27	Championship	12	1	0	0	1	0	—		13	1
Swansea City	Total		12	1	1	0	1	0	0	0	14	1
Falkirk (loan)	2025–26	Scottish Premiership	27	2	4	0	0	0	—		31	2
Career total			39	3	5	0	1	0	0	0	45	3
