= Tom Hounsell =

English football manager (born 1990)

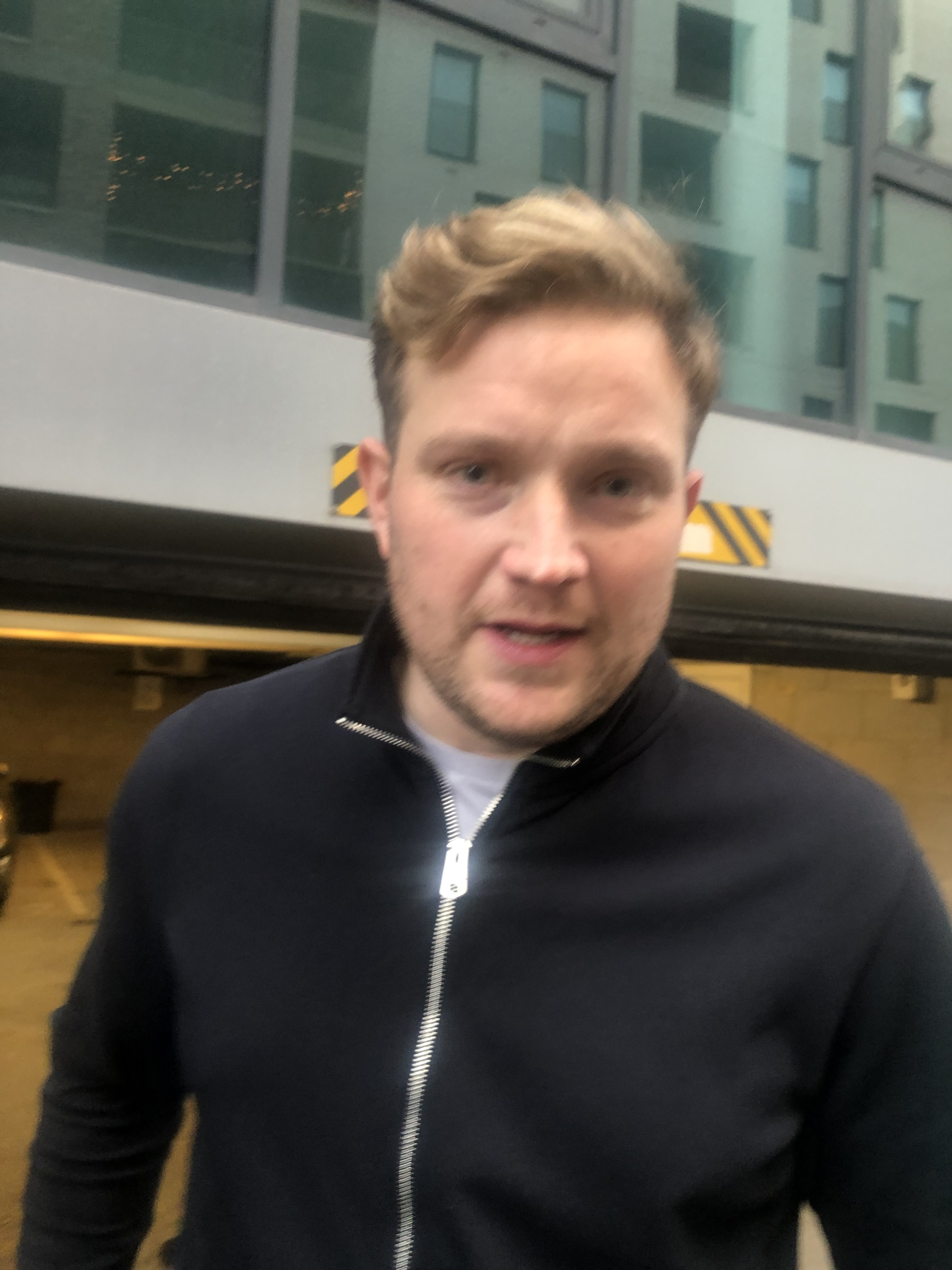
- Hounsell in 2024

Team information
- Current team: Wycombe Wanderers (head coach)

Managerial career
- Years: Team
- 2024: Burton Albion (caretaker)
- 2026–: Wycombe Wanderers

Tom Hounsell is an English professional football manager who is the head coach of EFL League One club Wycombe Wanderers.

== Career ==
=== Burton Albion ===
Hounsell is a former director of football programmes at St Mary's University, Twickenham, and worked at Fulham's academy before being appointed assistant manager of Burton Albion in EFL League One in June 2024. The new manager appointed was Mark Robinson, who moved from Chelsea's development squad. The pair were appointed by Burton's new owners, the Nordic Football Group (NFG). Robinson was sacked on 23 October with the club bottom, with four points from 11 games and no wins; Hounsell was named interim manager.

On 9 November, his team won 2–0 at home to Shrewsbury Town to secure their first win of the season at the fourteenth attempt. On 5 December, NFG said that Hounsell was being considered for the job on a permanent basis, having taken the club off last place in the table. On 17 December 2024, after a 4–0 defeat to Stevenage in the EFL Trophy a week prior, and following the appointment of Gary Bowyer, Hounsell opted to leave the club. He finished his managing career at Burton Albion having been in charge for 12 games.

=== Wycombe Wanderers ===
In February 2025, Hounsell was hired at fellow League One club Wycombe Wanderers, as a first-team coach under new head coach Mike Dodds. On 8 September 2026, Michael Duff was sacked and Hounsell was appointed interim head coach. Four days later, his team won 3–2 away to Leyton Orient on his debut, for their first win of the season. With two wins and a draw, he was nominated for the division's Manager of the Month, which went to Leam Richardson of Reading. On 10 October, with a record of four wins and a draw, he was appointed permanently.

== Managerial statistics ==
As of match played 21 November 2026

Managerial record by team and tenure
Team	From	To	Record					Ref.
Team	From	To	P	W	D	L	Win %	Ref.
Burton Albion (interim)	23 October 2024	17 December 2024	12	4	3	5	33.33	
Wycombe Wanderers	8 September 2026	present	12	7	3	2	58.33	
Total			24	11	6	7	45.83	
