= Cameron Stones (footballer) =

English association football player

Personal information
- Full name: Cameron Thomas Emlyn Stones
- Date of birth: 4 November 2008 (age 17)
- Place of birth: England
- Position: Midfielder

Team information
- Current team: Wycombe Wanderers
- Number: 64

Youth career
- –2023: Watford
- 2023–2025: Queens Park Rangers
- 2025: Wycombe Wanderers

Senior career*
Years	Team	Apps	(Gls)
2025–	Wycombe Wanderers	1	(0)
- * Club domestic league appearances and goals as of 16:55, 4 July 2026 (UTC)

Cameron Thomas Emlyn Stones (born 4 November 2008) is an English professional footballer who plays as a midfielder for EFL League One club Wycombe Wanderers.

== Career ==
=== Early career and Wycombe Wanderers ===
Stones progressed through the youth systems of Watford and Queens Park Rangers before joining Wycombe Wanderers ahead of the 2025–26 season. He made his senior debut for Wycombe in a 1–0 away victory over Leyton Orient in the EFL Cup, playing 70 minutes before being substituted.

On 14 November 2025, Stones signed his first professional contract, five months after joining the club as a scholar. He went on to make four appearances in all competitions during his debut season.

== Career statistics ==
As of match played 25 April 2026

Appearances and goals by club, season and competition
Club	Season	League			FA Cup		EFL Cup		Other		Total	
Club	Season	Division	Apps	Goals	Apps	Goals	Apps	Goals	Apps	Goals	Apps	Goals
Wycombe Wanderers	2025–26	League One	1	0	0	0	2	0	1 (Note: Appearances in EFL Trophy)	0	4	0
Wycombe Wanderers	2026–27	League One	0	0	0	0	0	0	0	0	0	0
Career total			1	0	0	0	2	0	1	0	4	0
