= Tiago Parente (footballer, born 2006) =

Portuguese footballer

Personal information
- Full name: Tiago Miguel Geraldes Parente
- Date of birth: 12 June 2006 (age 20)
- Place of birth: Bragança, Portugal
- Position: Left-back

Team information
- Current team: Swansea City (on loan from Benfica)
- Number: 20

Youth career
- –2018: FC Mãe d'Água
- 2018–2024: Benfica

Senior career*
Years	Team	Apps	(Gls)
2024–	Benfica B	33	(0)
2024–	Benfica	0	(0)
2026–	→ Swansea City (loan)	1	(0)

International career^{‡}
2023	Portugal U17	4	(0)
2023–2024	Portugal U18	11	(0)
2024–2025	Portugal U19	10	(0)
2025–	Portugal U20	12	(0)
- * Club domestic league appearances and goals as of 12:44, 31 October 2026 (UTC) ‡ National team caps and goals as of 14:37, 22 September 2026 (UTC)

Tiago Miguel Geraldes Parente (born 12 June 2006) is a Portuguese professional footballer who plays as a left-back for EFL Championship club Swansea City, on loan from Benfica.

== Club career ==
Born in Bragança, Parente started his career at FC Mãe d'Água, before joining Benfica on 5 June 2018, aged 12. In October 2022, he signed his first professional contract. He was a national youth champion in 2022–23, and the following season he played between the under-23 team, with five appearances in the UEFA Youth League, and Benfica B; his debut for the latter was on 17 May 2024, coming on as a substitute in a 5–2 win in a Liga Portugal 2 fixture against Porto B. In July 2024, he signed a new contract and was called up for training with the first team. Aged 18, he had his first call-up for a first-team match on 27 November 2024, away to Monaco in the UEFA Champions League; he was unused in the 3–2 win.

On 3 August 2026, Parente moved on a season-long loan to Swansea City in the EFL Championship, with an option to make the deal permanent; he was signed by compatriot manager Vítor Matos. He made his debut on 31 October in a 4–0 home win over Blackburn Rovers as a 72nd-minute substitute for Josh Tymon, and was praised by Matos.

== International career ==
Parente was one of eight Benfica players in the 20-member Portugal under-17 squad for the 2023 UEFA European Under-17 Championship in Hungary.

In September 2025, Parente was called up for the first time by manager Oceano Cruz for the Portugal national under-20 team, ahead of matches against the Czech Republic and Poland.
