= Swansea City A.F.C. =

Association football club in Swansea, Wales

Swansea City
- Full name: Swansea City Association Football Club
- Nicknames: The Swans; Yr Elyrch (Welsh); The Jacks
- Founded: 1912; 114 years ago, as Swansea Town
- Ground: Swansea.com Stadium
- Capacity: 21,000
- Owner(s): Swansea Football LLC (71.18%) Nigel Morris (12.9%) Swansea City Supporters Society Ltd (6.98%)
- CEO: Tom Gorringe
- Head coach: Ashley Williams (interim)
- League: EFL Championship
- 2025–26: EFL Championship, 11th of 24
- Website: swanseacity.com
Home colours

Swansea City Association Football Club (/ˈswɒnzi/ SWON-zee; Welsh: Clwb Pêl-droed Dinas Abertawe) is a professional football club based in Swansea, Wales. They compete in the EFL Championship, the second tier of English football. The club was founded in 1912 as Swansea Town but changed their name in 1970 to reflect Swansea's new status as a city. They have played their home matches at the Swansea.com Stadium (formerly known as the Liberty Stadium) since 2005, having previously played at the Vetch Field since their founding.

Swansea entered the Southern League in 1912 before joining the Football League in 1920. They won the Third Division South title in 1925 and 1949, but fell into the Fourth Division after relegations in 1965 and 1967. Swansea won three promotions in four seasons to reach the First Division in 1981, finishing sixth in the top flight (a club record), but were back in the Fourth Division by 1986. The club won the Third Division title in 2000 but narrowly avoided relegation to the Conference in 2003. They won their fourth league title in 2008 after winning League One.

In 2011, Swansea were promoted to the Premier League and won the League Cup two years later, qualifying for the UEFA Europa League. It was the first major trophy in the club's history; their other trophies include ten Welsh Cups, two Football League Trophies and two FAW Premier Cups. The club also qualified for the European Cup Winners' Cup seven times between 1961 and 1991. They were relegated from the Premier League in 2018, and have since played in the Championship.

Swansea's climb from the fourth division of English football to the Premier League is chronicled in the 2014 film, Jack to a King – The Swansea Story. Several players have won caps for their country while playing for the club, including for the Wales national football team. The Swansea City Supporters' Trust owns shares in the club; their involvement was hailed by Supporters Direct in 2012 as "the most high-profile example of a supporters' trust in the direct running of a club".

== History ==
=== Early years (1912–1945) ===
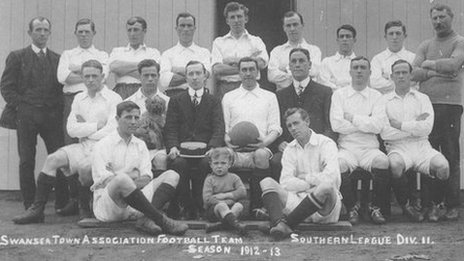
The Swansea Town team during its first season, 1912–13

Following an increasing interest in football in the Swansea area, the town's first professional football club, Swansea Town, was established in 1912. John William Thorpe, a local solicitor, was elected the club's first chairman. Players were recruited from around the United Kingdom and the team joined the Southern League Second Division under the club's first player-manager, Walter Whittaker. Swansea joined several other clubs in the division, including Cardiff City, who were Swansea's first professional league opponents. The match, played on 7 September 1912 at Swansea's Vetch Field, ended in a 1–1 draw with Billy Ball scoring Swansea's first goal.

During their first season, Swansea won the Welsh Cup, the Welsh league and came third in the Southern League Second Division. The following season, the club reached the first round proper of the FA Cup and finished fourth in the league. John William Bartlett took over from Whittaker in 1914. Under his leadership, the club beat reigning English champions Blackburn Rovers 1–0 in the first round of the 1914–15 FA Cup, with Swansea's goal coming from Ben Beynon.

After the First World War, the football leagues were restructured and the club began to compete in the new Third Division of the Football League in 1920. Swansea won their first championship in 1925 under manager Joe Bradshaw after winning the Third Division (South). The following season, they reached the semi-final of the FA Cup and finished fifth in the league. After Bradshaw left the club, Swansea were without a manager until 1927, when James Thompson was appointed. The club experienced financial strain over the next few years, with players being sold for cheaper alternatives; Thompson resigned in 1931. Despite this, Swansea won the Welsh Cup again in the 1931–32 season. The club had further financial difficulties in the 1930s but avoided relegation under manager Neil Harris before the Second World War began.

=== Post-war (1945–1970) ===
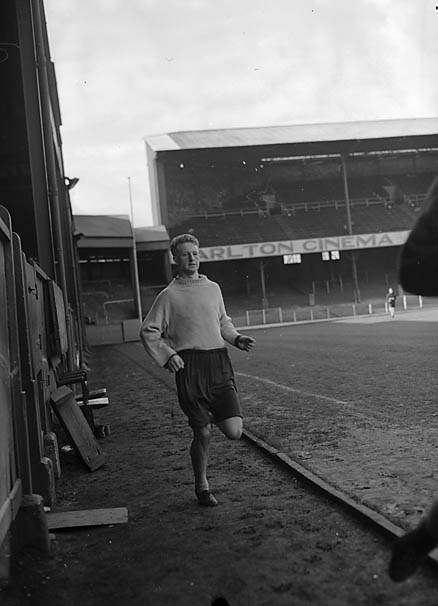
Ivor Allchurch scored 164 goals in 445 appearances for the Swans between 1947–1958 and 1965–1968

When football resumed after the war, Swansea were relegated to the Third Division in 1947 but were promoted back to the Second Division as champions in 1949. During the following seasons, Swansea saw several young players break through to the senior team, including the club's eventual captain Ivor Allchurch. The club cultivated strong local support during this period, with high attendances at league games, such as a record home league attendance against Leeds United in 1955. The club continued to struggle financially, however, but they again avoided relegation on the last day of the 1957–58 season.

In 1960, Swansea played their first match in the League Cup and won the Welsh Cup the following year, qualifying for the Cup Winners' Cup. This made Swansea the first Welsh club to enter a European competition. Manager Trevor Morris also led the club to the semi-final of the FA Cup in 1964, following a run which included a 2–1 away win against Liverpool in the quarter-final. Swansea were relegated back to the Third Division the following season and the financial situation at the club became critical.

Despite finishing seventeenth in the league under Glyn Davies, the club won the Welsh Cup again and qualified for their second European adventure. In 1967, however, the club were relegated to the Fourth Division, the first time in the club's history. Despite this, Swansea saw the highest attendance at the Vetch Field (32,796) for their game against Arsenal in the FA Cup in 1968, which Swansea lost. Tragedy struck the club in January 1969 when players Roy Evans and Brian Purcell were killed in a car crash on the way to a game.

=== Success and decline (1970–1986) ===
Chart showing the progress of Swansea City A.F.C. through the English football league system

After Swansea became a city in 1969, the club changed their name to Swansea City in early 1970. Roy Bentley's side celebrated by securing promotion back to the Third Division. After mid-table finishes at the end of the following two seasons, the club made a poor start to the 1972–73 season, which saw Bentley being replaced by Harry Gregg. Gregg failed to stop the team's decline and the club was back in the Fourth Division for the 1973–74 season. He was replaced by Harry Griffiths, the club's physiotherapist who had also played for Swansea. Financial issues continued to plague the club and Swansea were forced to apply for re-election to the Football League.

Swansea failed to win promotion in 1977, and Griffiths resigned the following year despite a positive start to the season. He was replaced by John Toshack. Swansea were promoted in 1978, and Toshack led the club to the Second Division the following season and the First Division in 1981. They beat Preston North End 3–1 to guarantee their promotion, with goals from Tommy Craig, Leighton James and Jeremy Charles. Swansea's four-year rise to the top division became a record in English football, held jointly with Wimbledon. Swansea also won the Welsh Cup that season, qualifying for Europe for the first time since the 1965–66 season.

The club's first match in the top flight was a 5–1 win against Leeds United, and they also defeated Tottenham Hotspur, Arsenal, Liverpool and Manchester United during the season. Swansea were top of the league with twelve games to play, but finished sixth. They won the Welsh Cup again to qualify for Europe. Despite being relegated to the Second Division the following season, Swansea enjoyed success in Europe after defeating Braga and winning 12–0 against Sliema Wanderers, a club record result. Swansea were subsequently defeated by Paris-Saint Germain. Amid financial pressures, Toshack left the club in October 1983, returned eight weeks later, but left Swansea again in 1984 with the team back in the Third Division.

By 1985, the club was battling for its survival and was issued a winding-up order. Local people raised money for the club, and Manchester United played a friendly match which raised £45,000. The club was saved by Peter Howard, Harry Hyde, Bobby Jones, Mel Nurse and Dave Savage (who came to be known as the "Famous Five"), along with local businessman Doug Sharpe, although the change of ownership was not enough to prevent relegation to the Fourth Division in 1986.

=== Promotions, relegations and last years at the Vetch Field (1986–2005) ===
Swansea were promoted from the Fourth Division in 1988 after winning the play-offs. The club won the Welsh Cup again in 1989 and 1991 to qualify for Europe. After a period of relative stability, Swansea reached the play-off semi-finals of the new Second Division in 1993 before making their first appearance at Wembley Stadium a year later, when they defeated Huddersfield Town to win the Football League Trophy.

After Jan Mølby became player-manager, the club was relegated to the lowest division, although they made it to another Wembley play-off final in 1997, which they lost. Chairman Sharpe sold the club, and Swansea saw several managers during this period. Following another unsuccessful play-off semi-final in 1999, Swansea won the Third Division in 2000. However, the 1–1 draw at Rotherham United, which confirmed Swansea as Third Division champions, was overshadowed by the death of supporter Terry Coles, who was trampled to death by a police horse before the game.

In July 2001, following relegation back to the Third Division, the club was sold to managing director Mike Lewis for £1. One month later, the Swansea City Supporters' Trust was formed. Lewis subsequently sold his stake to a consortium of Australian businessmen behind the Brisbane Lions football team, fronted by Tony Petty, again for £1. After supporter demonstrations against Petty's management, during which he attempted to sack seven players to cut costs, the club was sold to a local consortium led by Mel Nurse. Huw Jenkins was named chairman in January 2002.

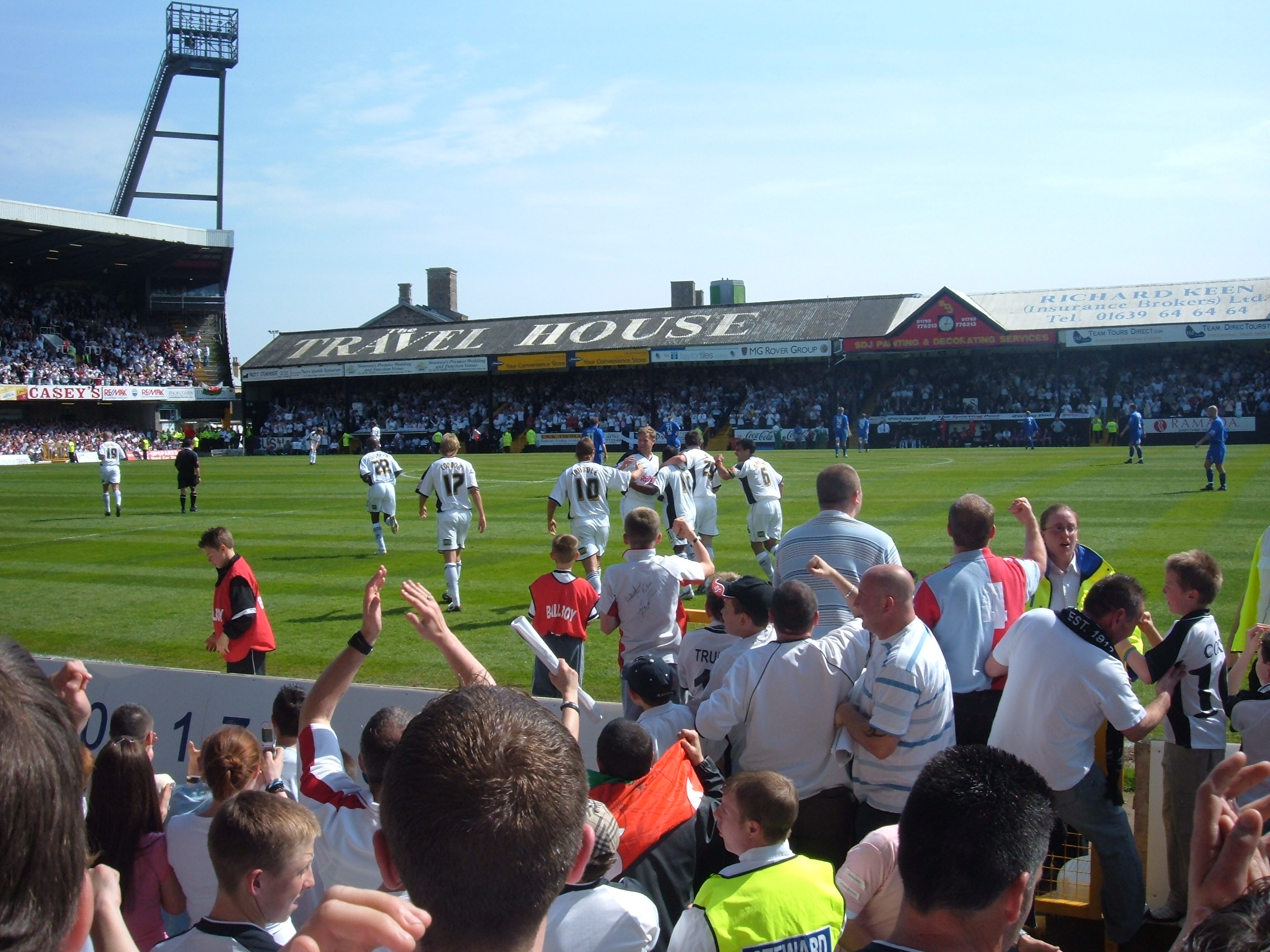
Swansea fans and players celebrate the last league goal to be scored at the Vetch Field

Swansea were also struggling on the pitch. The new ownership sought to keep the team in the Football League, and Brian Flynn was named manager in late 2002. With the signings of new players including Roberto Martínez and Leon Britton, Flynn kept Swansea in the Football League following their victory against Hull City on the last day of the 2002–03 season. Despite a positive start to the following season, Kenny Jackett replaced Flynn in 2004. Jackett led Swansea to League One promotion in the club's final season at the Vetch Field. They also won the FAW Premier Cup on the last day at the Vetch.

=== Move to the Liberty Stadium and return to the top flight (2005–2016) ===
The club moved to the new Liberty Stadium in July 2005, with the first league game being a 1–0 win against Tranmere Rovers. In the first season at the stadium, Swansea won the Football League Trophy for the first time since 1994 and the FAW Premier Cup for a second successive year. The club also reached the League One play-off final, but lost to Barnsley.

Roberto Martínez, Swansea's former captain, replaced Jackett as manager in 2007 mid-season. He led Swansea to Championship promotion as League One champions in 2008 while implementing a possession-based style of play at the club. When Martínez left Swansea in 2009, Paulo Sousa replaced him before leaving himself in 2010. Before Sousa's departure, Swansea player Besian Idrizaj suffered a heart attack while on international duty; the club retired the number 40 shirt in his memory.

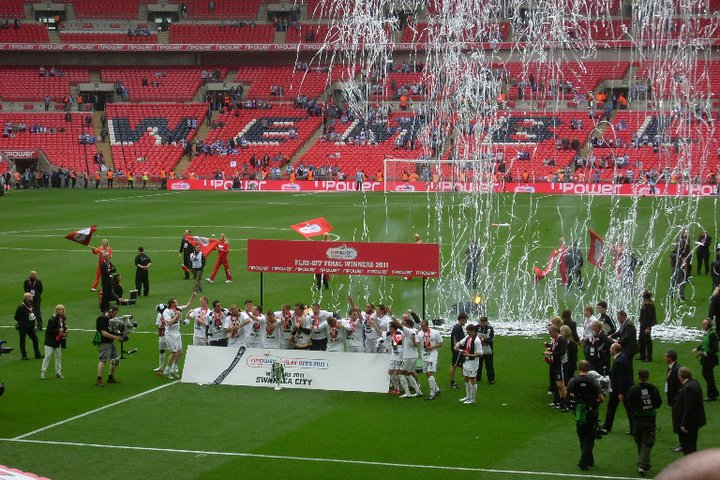
Swansea City celebrate promotion to the Premier League at Wembley Stadium

Brendan Rodgers replaced Sousa and led the club to the Premier League in 2011 after defeating Reading 4–2 in the play-off final, with Scott Sinclair scoring a hat-trick. Swansea became the first Welsh team to play in the Premier League since its formation in 1992. Ahead of their debut season, the club signed Danny Graham from Watford for a then-record fee of £3.5 million. They defeated Arsenal, Liverpool and Manchester City, the eventual champions, at home during the season. Swansea finished eleventh in the league, but Rodgers left to manage Liverpool at the end of the season.

The Swansea City A.F.C. centenary crest used during the 2012–13 season

Rodgers was replaced by Michael Laudrup for the 2012–13 season, which was the club's centenary season. Laudrup's first league game ended in a 5–0 victory over Queens Park Rangers away at Loftus Road. Swansea then beat West Ham United 3–0 at the Liberty Stadium, with Michu scoring his third goal in two games. This saw Swansea top of the Premier League; it was the first time since March 1982 the team had been at the summit of the top tier. After cup victories against Liverpool and Chelsea, Swansea beat Bradford City 5–0 in the 2013 Football League Cup final, which was the biggest win in the final of the competition. It was Swansea's first major piece of silverware in England and qualified them for the 2013–14 UEFA Europa League. Swansea finished the Premier League season in ninth place, and Michu was the club's top scorer in all competitions with 22 goals. That summer, they paid a club record transfer fee of £12 million for striker Wilfried Bony from Vitesse Arnhem.

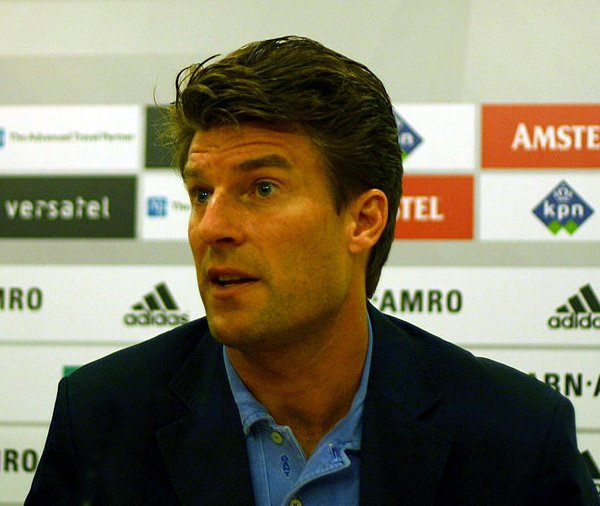
Michael Laudrup led Swansea to the Europa League and a top half finish in the Premier League

Swansea enjoyed initial success in Europe, beating Spanish side Valencia 3–0 at the Mestalla Stadium in September 2013. Two months later, they lost the first Welsh derby in the Premier League to Cardiff City following a 1–0 defeat. In February 2014, Laudrup was dismissed after poor form and accusations of financial impropriety involving his agent Bayram Tutumlu. Defender Garry Monk, a Swansea player since 2004, was named as his replacement. In Monk's first game, Swansea beat Cardiff 3–0 at the Liberty Stadium. Despite holding Rafael Benítez's Napoli to a 0–0 draw in the first leg of the Europa League Round of 32, Swansea exited the competition after losing 3–1 in the second leg at the Stadio San Paolo on 27 February 2014.

Bony was sold to Manchester City for a record sale of £25 million in January 2015, with add-ons reportedly leading to £28 million. This deal eclipsed the record fee Swansea received from Liverpool for Joe Allen at £15 million. At the time of the sale, Bony was the club's top scorer with 34 goals in all competitions, and the league's top scorer for the 2014 calendar year, with 20 goals. Swansea finished eighth in the league at the end of the 2014–15 season with 56 points, their highest position and points haul for a Premier League season, and second highest finish in the top flight of all time. During the season, they produced league doubles over Arsenal and Manchester United, becoming only the third team in Premier League history to do so. Monk was sacked the following season after poor form and replaced by Francesco Guidolin.

=== American ownership and return to the Championship (2016–present) ===
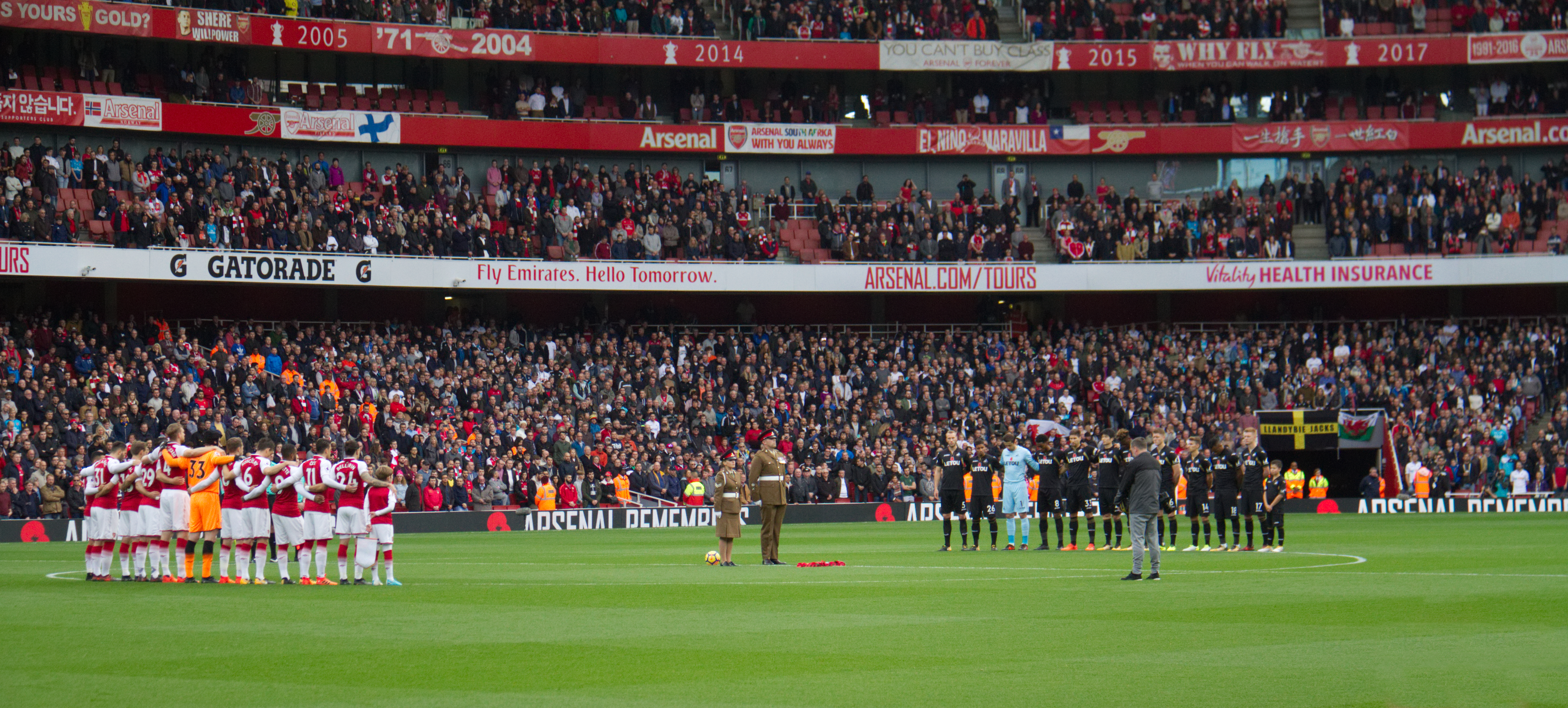
Swansea line up against Arsenal at the Emirates Stadium in 2017

In July 2016, an American consortium led by Jason Levien and Steven Kaplan bought a controlling interest in the club, but chairman Huw Jenkins remained. Three months later, Guidolin was dismissed and replaced by Bob Bradley, which was the first time a Premier League club had hired an American manager. Bradley was dismissed after 85 days; he won only two of his eleven games. He was replaced by Paul Clement, who secured Swansea's Premier League status in May 2017. A poor first half of the 2017–18 season saw Clement dismissed and replaced by Carlos Carvalhal. Despite consecutive league home wins against Liverpool (1–0), Arsenal (3–1), Burnley (1–0), and West Ham (4–1), Swansea were winless in their last nine league games (losing five) under Carvalhal, leaving them in eighteenth place on the final day of the season. They were relegated on 13 May 2018, following a 2–1 defeat to already-relegated Stoke City.

The first season back in the Championship produced a tenth-place finish under new manager Graham Potter, including a quarter-final appearance in the FA Cup. Jenkins resigned as chairman amid criticism over the club's sale to the American consortium in 2016 and relegation from the Premier League. After Potter left to manage Brighton, former England U17 manager Steve Cooper replaced him. In September 2019, Swansea sat at the top of the table after an unbeaten first month; this was the club's best start to a season in 41 years. On the final day of the season, Swansea defeated Reading 4–1 to finish sixth, moving into the play-offs ahead of Nottingham Forest on goal difference, but were later defeated by Brentford in the semi-final second leg.

At the end of the 2020–21 season, Swansea finished fourth in the league and secured a play-off place for a second consecutive season. They progressed to the play-off final after defeating Barnsley 2–1 on aggregate, but lost to Brentford at Wembley Stadium. After Cooper left the club, Russell Martin became head coach in 2021, leading the team to mid-table finishes before moving to Southampton in 2023. The following seasons saw several managers hired and dismissed, with the team struggling in the league. Swansea also saw changes in ownership when Levien and Kaplan sold their majority shareholding in November 2024. In the following months, Real Madrid footballer Luka Modrić, American rapper Snoop Dogg, and lifestyle mogul Martha Stewart joined the club's new ownership group.

== Stadium ==
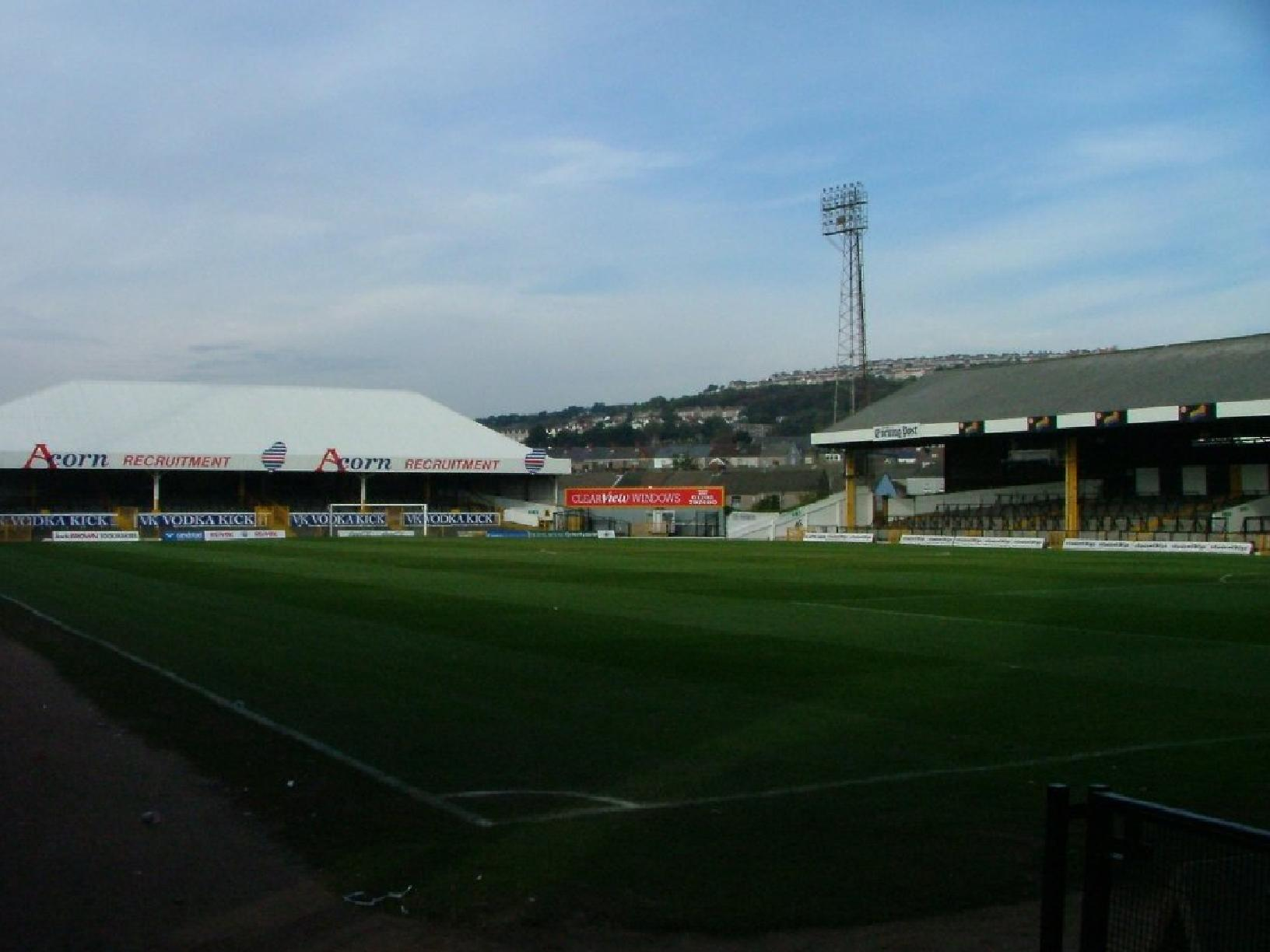
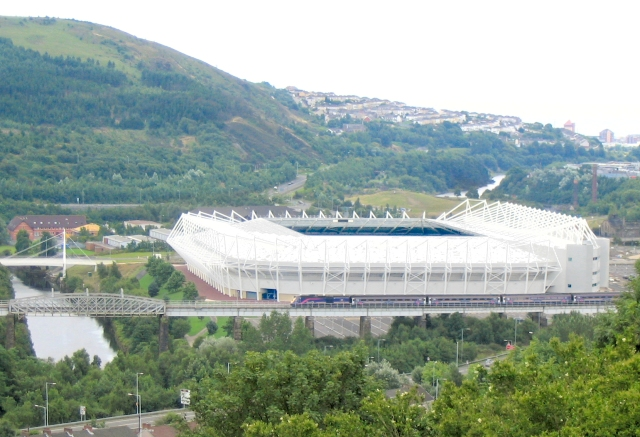
The Vetch Field (left) was the home of Swansea City for 93 years, while the Liberty Stadium opened in 2005 and was renamed the Swansea.com Stadium in 2021

The Vetch Field was Swansea's home ground between 1912, the year the club was founded, and 2005. The ground saw a record attendance of 32,796 in a 1968 FA Cup fourth-round game against Arsenal. The final game at the Vetch was Swansea's win against Wrexham in the 2004–05 FAW Premier Cup.

On 10 July 2005, Swansea's new home ground, the Liberty Stadium, was officially opened. The first game to be played at the stadium was Swansea's friendly game against Fulham. The Liberty became the first Premier League stadium in Wales when Swansea were promoted to the Premier League. Aside from being the home of Swansea City, the stadium has hosted Welsh international football matches and has also been the home of the Ospreys rugby team. It was renamed the Swansea.com Stadium on 9 August 2021, following a 10-year naming rights agreement. As of September 2025, the stadium's capacity is 21,000.

== Rivalries ==
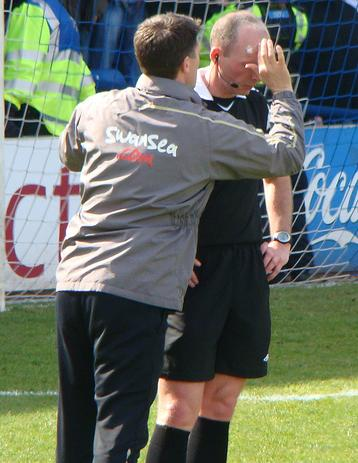
Referee Mike Dean receiving treatment after being struck by a projectile in a South Wales derby

Swansea City's main rivals are Cardiff City. Matches between the two clubs are known as the South Wales derbies. The rivalry has been described as among the most hostile in British football, particularly after the 1960s. In a 2009 match, referee Mike Dean was struck on the head by a coin thrown from the crowd in the 2–2 draw between the clubs.

While Cardiff have won more derby matches, neither team had completed the league double until the 2021–22 season. During the season, Swansea won 3–0 and 4–0 to become the first side to complete the double in the derby's 110-year history. The following season, Swansea beat Cardiff 2–0 at home and 3–2 in the away game, which marked a fourth consecutive derby win and a second consecutive league double.

Swansea City and Bristol City have also been described as rivals.

== Identity ==
=== Nicknames ===
People from Swansea are nicknamed Jacks, a nickname also associated with the football club. According to Swansea University history professor Martin Johnes, Jack was a nickname for sailors, who would be described in other cities by their hometown, hence "Swansea Jack". A famed local canine lifeguard in the 1930s was coincidentally named Swansea Jack, helping popularise the name further. Johnes said that the association of the Jack nickname with Swansea's people and football club is evident from after World War II.

=== Kits and crests ===
Swansea's crest for the 2021–22 season, based on a design used until 1998. The background colour was altered to light blue in 2022–23 before the 1998 design was reinstated.

Upon foundation in 1912, Swansea Town adopted white shirts and shorts due to Swansea RFC, a rugby union team. Secondary colours on the home kit have predominantly been black, with orange in the 1960s and red in the 1990s and 2000s. In 2012–13, the club celebrated their centenary with a copper-trimmed kit and a commemorative crest.

When new owners Silver Shield took over in 1998, they changed the club crest as the bird on it was not universally recognisable as a swan, and the background was blue, the colour of rivals Cardiff City. In 2021, to mark the 40th anniversary of the club's first promotion to the top flight in 1981, Swansea City reintroduced the badge that had preceded the 1998 design. Though it was not used on kits until the 1990s, it was used on stationery and merchandise in the 1980s. The 1998 crest was reintroduced to kits in 2023.

=== Kit manufacturers and sponsors ===
Period	Kit manufacturer	Shirt sponsor
1975–1979	Bukta	none
1979–1981	Adidas	none
1981–1984	Patrick	none
1984–1985	Hummel	Diversified Products (DP)
1986–1989	Admiral Sportswear	Diversified Products (DP)
1989–1991	Spall Sports	Diversified Products (DP)
1991–1992	Spall Sports	none
1992–1993	Matchwinner	ACTION
1993–1995	Matchwinner	Gulf
1995–1996	Le Coq Sportif	Gulf
1996–1997	Le Coq Sportif	South Wales Evening Post
1997–1999	New Balance	Silver Shield
1999–2000	New Balance	M&P Bikes
2000–2001	Bergoni	Stretchout
2001–2004	Bergoni	The Travel House
2004–2005	Bergoni	RE/MAX
2005–2007	Macron	The Travel House
2007–2008	Macron	swansea.com
2008–2009	Umbro	swansea.com
2009–2011	Umbro	32Red
2011–2013	Adidas	32Red
2013–2016	Adidas	GWFX
2016–2017	Joma	BETEAST
2017–2018	Joma	LeTou
2018–2019	Joma	Bet UK
2019–2020	Joma	YOBET
2020–2022	Joma	Swansea University
2022–2023	Joma	Westacres (Home); Swansea University (Away); Owens (Third)
2023–2025	Joma	Reviva (Home); Westacres (Away and Third)
2025–2026	Joma	Reviva (Home and Away); Gulf (Third)
2026–future	Joma	AG1

== European record ==
Swansea City's scores are given first in all scorelines.

Season	Competition	Round	Opponent	Home	Away	Aggregate	Refs
1961–62	UEFA Cup Winners' Cup	Preliminary round	(East Germany) Motor Jena	2–2	1–5	3–7	
1966–67	UEFA Cup Winners' Cup	First round	(Bulgaria) Slavia Sofia	1–1	0–4	1–5	
1981–82	UEFA Cup Winners' Cup	First round	(East Germany) Lokomotive Leipzig	0–1	1–2	1–3	
1982–83	UEFA Cup Winners' Cup	Preliminary round	(Portugal) Braga	3–0	0–1	3–1	
1982–83	UEFA Cup Winners' Cup	First round	(Malta) Sliema Wanderers	12–0	5–0	17–0	
1982–83	UEFA Cup Winners' Cup	Second round	(France) Paris Saint-Germain	0–1	0–2	0–3	
1983–84	UEFA Cup Winners' Cup	Preliminary round	(East Germany) Magdeburg	1–1	0–1	1–2	
1989–90	UEFA Cup Winners' Cup	First round	(Greece) Panathinaikos	2–3	3–3	5–6	
1991–92	UEFA Cup Winners' Cup	First round	(France) AS Monaco	1–2	0–8	1–10	
2013–14	UEFA Europa League	Third qualifying round	(Sweden) Malmö FF	4–0	0–0	4–0	
2013–14	UEFA Europa League	Play-off round	(Romania) Petrolul Ploiești	5–1	1–2	6–3	
2013–14	UEFA Europa League	Group stage	(Russia) Kuban Krasnodar	1–1	1–1	2nd place	
2013–14	UEFA Europa League	Group stage	(Switzerland) St. Gallen	1–0	0–1	2nd place	
2013–14	UEFA Europa League	Group stage	(Spain) Valencia	0–1	3–0	2nd place	
2013–14	UEFA Europa League	Round of 32	(Italy) Napoli	0–0	1–3	1–3	

== Players ==
=== Current squad ===
As of 11 September 2026

Note: Flags indicate national team as defined under FIFA eligibility rules; some limited exceptions apply. Players may hold more than one non-FIFA nationality.

No.	Pos.	Nation	Player
1	GK	ENG	Andy Fisher
2	DF	ENG	Joshua Key
3	DF	NED	Jenson Seelt (on loan from Sunderland)
4	MF	SCO	Jay Fulton
5	DF	WAL	Ben Cabango (captain)
6	MF	NZL	Marko Stamenić
7	MF	SWE	Melker Widell
8	MF	NZL	Elijah Just
9	FW	SLO	Žan Vipotnik
10	FW	KOR	Eom Ji-sung
12	FW	ENG	Jeremy Monga (on loan from Manchester City)
14	DF	ENG	Josh Tymon
15	DF	AUS	Cameron Burgess

No.	Pos.	Nation	Player
16	MF	ENG	Tom Iorpenda
17	MF	POR	Gonçalo Franco
20	DF	POR	Tiago Parente (on loan from Benfica)
22	GK	CHI	Lawrence Vigouroux
23	DF	SCO	Stephen Welsh
26	DF	CZE	Filip Lissah
29	GK	ENG	Paul Farman
30	FW	GHA	Joseph Opoku
31	FW	SCO	Ross Stewart
33	FW	IRL	Adam Idah
35	FW	BRA	Ronald
46	MF	CAN	Stephen Eustáquio
49	MF	MLI	Moussa Yeo

=== Out on loan ===
Note: Flags indicate national team as defined under FIFA eligibility rules; some limited exceptions apply. Players may hold more than one non-FIFA nationality.

No.	Pos.	Nation	Player
—	FW	WAL	Morgan Bates (on loan at Inverness Caledonian Thistle until 30 June 2027)
—	DF	WAL	Sam Parker (on loan at Wycombe Wanderers until 30 June 2027)
—	MF	WAL	Ollie Cooper (on loan at Notts County until 30 June 2027)
—	MF	FIN	Leo Walta (on loan at Los Angeles until January 2027)
—	FW	FRA	Florian Bianchini (on loan at Clermont Foot until 30 June 2027)
—	FW	SWE	Zeidane Inoussa (on loan at Górnik Zabrze until 30 June 2027)

No.	Pos.	Nation	Player
—	FW	ENG	Josh Pescatore (at Buxton until 30 June 2027)
—	DF	SCO	Blair McKenzie (at Waterford until 31 December 2026)
—	FW	SCO	Bobby Wales (at Dundee until 30 June 2027)
—	MF	WAL	Jacob Cook (at Hemel Hempstead until January 2027)
—	MF	WAL	Daniel Watts (at Exeter City until 30 June 2027)

=== Retired numbers ===
Note: Flags indicate national team as defined under FIFA eligibility rules; some limited exceptions apply. Players may hold more than one non-FIFA nationality.

No.	Pos.	Nation	Player
40	FW	AUT	Besian Idrizaj (2009–10) – posthumous honour)

== Club officials and backroom staff ==
=== Club officials ===
As of 12 September 2025

Shareholders who own 10% or more of the issued share capital include Swansea Football LLC (controlled by Brett Cravatt and Jason Cohen) and Nigel Morris, while Swansea City Supporters Society Ltd is also a shareholder. Luka Modrić and Snoop Dogg are co-owners and investors.

Position	Name
Honorary club president	Alan Curtis
Chief executive officer	Tom Gorringe
Directors	Andy Coleman; Brett Cravatt; Jason Cohen; George Popstefanov; Chris Sznewajs; Tyler Morse; Nigel Morris; Todd Marcelle; Keith English; Martin Morgan; Paul Meller (Supporter Director); Diane Hughes

=== First-team staff ===
As of 18 November 2026

Position	Name
Head coach	Ashley Williams (interim)
Assistant coaches	Vacant
First-team coaches	Kristian O'Leary; Leon Britton; Joe Allen
Head of goalkeeping	Pedro Pereira
Head of medical	Dr. Jez McCluskey
Head physiotherapist	Thomas Gittoes
Head analyst	Gonçalo Ricca
First-team kit manager	Michael Eames

=== Academy staff ===
As of 8 December 2025

Position	Name
Academy manager	Ryan Davies
Head of operations	Rebecca Gigg
Head of coaching	Liam McGarry
Under 21s coach	Anthony Wright
Under 18s coach	Joe Roberts
Head of youth development phase	Matthew Layton

=== Managers ===
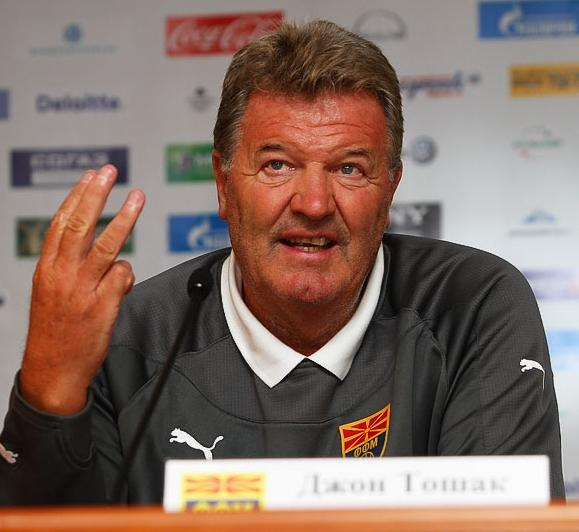
John Toshack managed Swansea between 1978 and 1984

Swansea City's first professional manager was Walter Whittaker, who was appointed in 1912. In the club's first season, Whittaker led Swansea to their first Welsh Cup win. The club's longest-serving manager, in terms of tenure, was Haydn Green, who held the position for eight years, four months and 14 days, spanning the entirety of World War II. Trevor Morris, who oversaw the most games at Swansea, was also the first manager to lead a Welsh club in Europe, qualifying for the 1961–62 Cup Winners' Cup.

John Toshack, Swansea City's most successful manager with three league promotions and three Welsh Cup wins, led the club to their highest league finish, sixth place in the 1981–82 First Division. Appointed in February 1996, the Dane Jan Mølby became Swansea's first foreign manager and took them to the 1996–97 Division Three play-off final, which they lost. In 2011, Swansea achieved promotion to the Premier League under Brendan Rodgers, becoming the first Welsh team to play in the division since its formation in 1992. During the club's centenary year (2012–13), they won the League Cup for the first time under Michael Laudrup, the first major English trophy in Swansea's 100-year history.

== Records and statistics ==
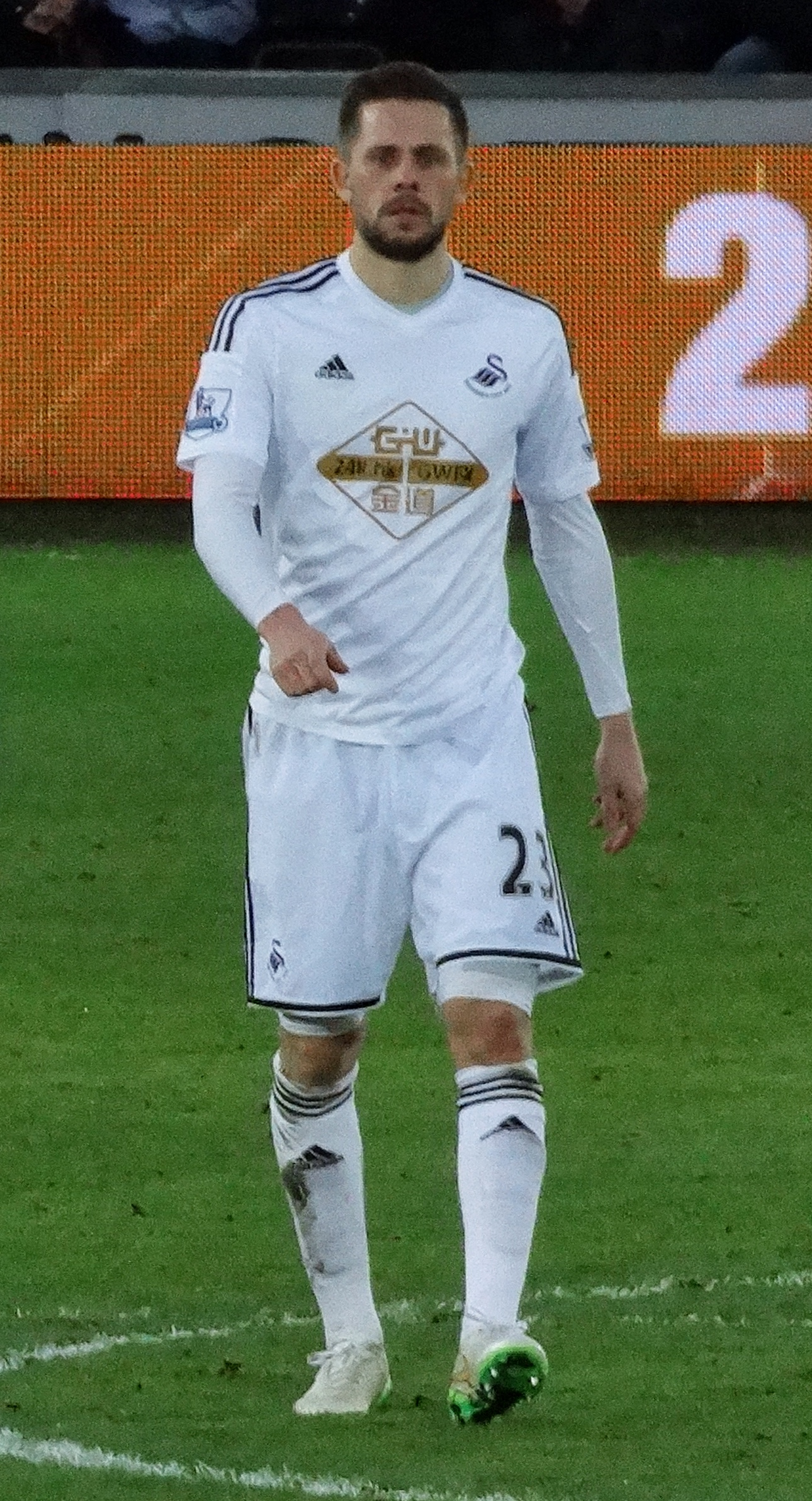
Gylfi Sigurðsson is Swansea's most expensive sale; he was the club's top scorer in the Premier League, with 34 goals

Wilfred Milne holds the record for Swansea appearances, having played 586 matches between 1920 and 1937, closely followed by Roger Freestone with 563 between 1991 and 2004. The player who has won the most international caps while at the club is Ashley Williams with 50 for Wales.

The goalscoring record is held by Ivor Allchurch, with 166 goals, scored between 1947 and 1958 and between 1965 and 1968. Cyril Pearce holds the record for the most league goals scored in a season, in 1931–32, with 35 league goals in the Second Division.

The club's widest victory margin was 12–0, a scoreline which they achieved once in the European Cup Winners' Cup, against Sliema in 1982. They have lost by an eight-goal margin on two occasions, once in the FA Cup, beaten 0–8 by Liverpool in 1990 and once in the European Cup Winners' Cup, beaten 0–8 by AS Monaco in 1991. Swansea's 8–1 win against Notts County in the FA Cup in 2018 is their largest winning margin of the competition, and the largest winning margin at their home ground, the Liberty Stadium.

Swansea's home attendance record was set at the fourth round FA Cup tie against Arsenal on 17 February 1968, with 32,796 fans attending the Vetch Field. The club broke their transfer record to re-sign André Ayew from West Ham United in January 2018 for a fee of £18 million. The most expensive sale is Gylfi Sigurðsson who joined Everton in August 2017 for a fee believed to be £45 million.

== Honours ==
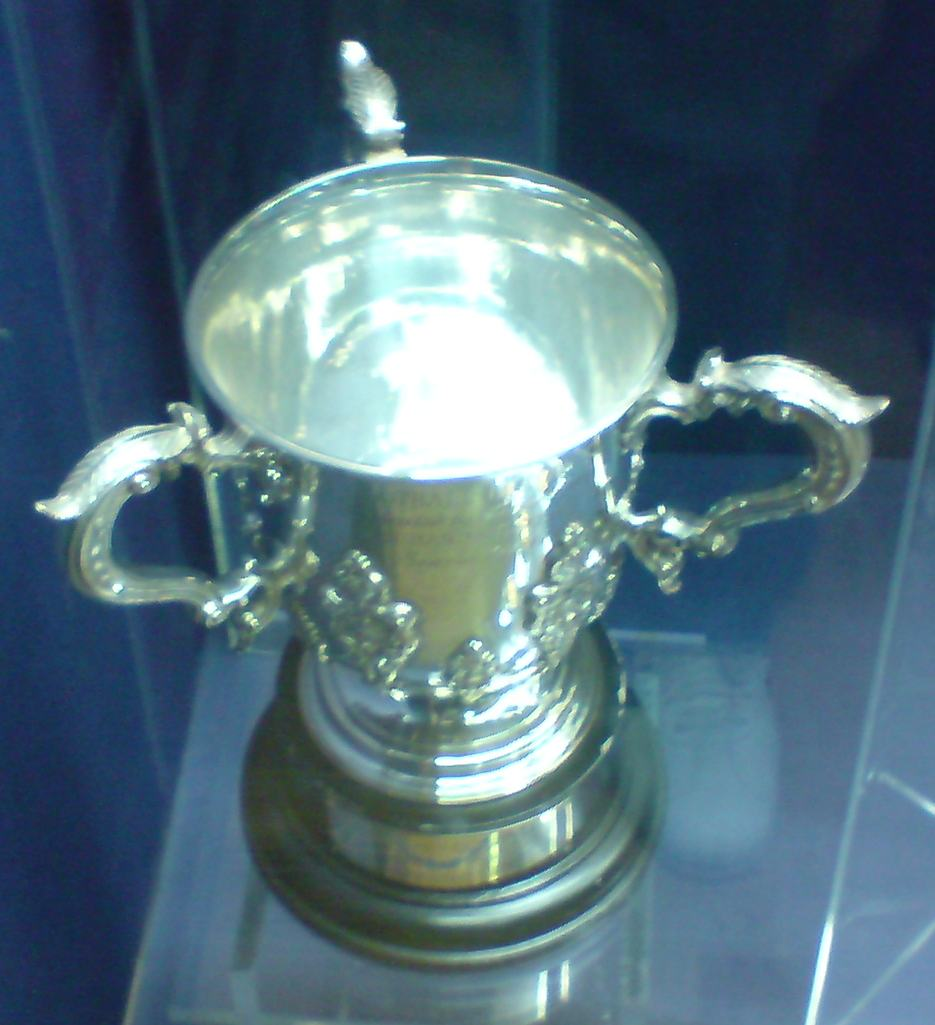
Swansea won the League Cup in 2013, their first major trophy in England

Swansea City's first trophy was the Welsh Cup, which they won as Swansea Town in 1913. Their first league honour came in 1925, when they won the 1924–25 Football League Third Division South title. Since then, Swansea have gone on to win the League Cup once, the Football League Trophy twice and the Welsh Cup a further nine times. They have also qualified for UEFA Cup Winners' Cup seven times and the UEFA Europa League once.

Swansea City's honours include the following:

League

- Second Division / Championship (level 2)
  - Promoted: 1980–81
  - Play-off winners: 2011
- Third Division South / Third Division / League One (level 3)
  - Champions: 1924–25, 1948–49, 2007–08
  - Promoted: 1978–79
- Fourth Division / Third Division / League Two (level 4)
  - Champions: 1999–2000
  - Promoted: 1969–70, 1977–78, 2004–05
  - Play-off winners: 1988

Cup

- Football League Cup
  - Winners: 2012–13
- Football League Trophy
  - Winners: 1993–94, 2005–06
- Welsh Cup
  - Winners (10): 1912–13, 1931–32, 1949–50, 1960–61, 1965–66, 1980–81, 1981–82, 1982–83, 1988–89, 1990–91
- FAW Premier Cup
  - Winners: 2004–05, 2005–06
