= 2024–25 Swansea City A.F.C. season =

113th season in existence of Swansea City AFC

Swansea City
2024–25 season
- Owner: Swansea City Football 2002 Ltd
- Chairman: Andy Coleman
- Head Coach: Luke Williams (until 17 February); Alan Sheehan (from 17 February)
- Stadium: Swansea.com Stadium
- Championship: 11th
- FA Cup: Third Round
- EFL Cup: Second Round
- Top goalscorer: League: Liam Cullen (11); All: Liam Cullen (12)
- Highest home attendance: 20,174 (v. Cardiff City, EFL Championship, 25 August 2024)
- Lowest home attendance: 6,000 (v. Wycombe Wanderers F.C., EFL Cup, 28 August 2024)
- Average home league attendance: 15,499
- Biggest win: 3–0 (v. Preston North End, 17 August 2024, EFL Championship)
- Biggest defeat: 5–1 (v. Norwich City, 25 January 2025, EFL Championship)
Home colours

The 2024–25 season was the 113th season in the history of Swansea City Association Football Club and their seventh consecutive season in the Championship. In addition to the domestic league, the club would also participate in the FA Cup, and the EFL Cup.

== Transfers ==
=== In ===
Date	Pos.	Player	From	Fee	Ref.
12 July 2024	CM	Gonçalo Franco (POR)	Moreirense (POR)	Undisclosed	
15 July 2024	LW	Eom Ji-sung (KOR)	Gwangju (KOR)	Undisclosed	
15 July 2024	GK	Lawrence Vigouroux (CHI)	Burnley (ENG)	Undisclosed	
1 August 2024	CF	Žan Vipotnik (SVN)	Bordeaux (FRA)	Undisclosed	
14 August 2024	RB	Zac Jeanes (ENG) (Note: Signed initially for the Under-21s)	Worthing (ENG)	Free	
23 August 2024	RW	Florian Bianchini (FRA)	Bastia (FRA)	Undisclosed	
28 August 2024	GK	Jon McLaughlin (SCO)	Rangers (SCO)	Free	
1 November 2024	RB	Cyrus Christie (IRL)	Hull City (ENG)	Free	
31 January 2025	CM	Melker Widell (SWE)	AaB (DEN)	Undisclosed	

=== Out ===
Date	Pos.	Player	To	Fee	Ref.
5 July 2024	CB	Nathan Wood (ENG)	Southampton (ENG)	Undisclosed	
22 January 2025	CB	Azeem Abdulai (SCO)	Leyton Orient (ENG)	Undisclosed	
31 January 2025	DM	Matt Grimes (ENG)	Coventry City (ENG)	Undisclosed	

=== Loaned in ===
Date	Pos.	Player	From	Date until	Ref.
23 August 2024	CB	Nelson Abbey (ENG)	Olympiacos (GRE)	3 January 2025 (Note: On 3 January, Abbey was recalled back to parent club Olympiacos)	
30 August 2024	AM	Myles Peart-Harris (JAM)	Brentford (ENG)	End of season	
24 January 2025	CB	Hannes Delcroix (BEL)	Burnley (ENG)	End of season	
3 February 2025	CM	Lewis O'Brien (ENG)	Nottingham Forest (ENG)	End of season	

=== Loaned out ===
Date	Pos.	Player	To	Date until	Ref.
2 July 2024	CF	Jerry Yates (ENG)	Derby County (ENG)	End of season	
3 July 2024	RW	Maliq Cadogan (GUY)	Kidderminster Harriers (ENG)	1 January 2025	
30 July 2024	AM	Joel Cotterill (WAL)	Swindon Town (ENG)	End of season	
2 August 2024	CM	Cameron Congreve (WAL)	Bromley (ENG)	End of season	
3 August 2024	CF	Mykola Kukharevych (UKR)	Hibernian (SCO)	End of season	
23 August 2024	LW	Liam Smith (SCO)	Partick Thistle (SCO)	24 January 2025 (Note: On 24 January, Smith was recalled back from his loan at Partick)	
30 August 2024	CF	Josh Thomas (WAL)	Bromley (ENG)	17 January 2025 (Note: On 17 January, Thomas was recalled back from his loan at Bromley and subsequently loaned to Drogheda)	
9 September 2024	CB	Harry Jones (WAL)	Weymouth (ENG)	3 February 2025 (Note: On 3 February, Jones was recalled back from his loan at Weymouth and subsequently departed the club by mutual consent)	
3 January 2025	CM	Mitchell Bates (WAL)	Truro City (ENG)	End of season	
7 January 2025	GK	Andy Fisher (ENG)	St Johnstone (SCO)	End of season	
7 January 2025	GK	Ben Hughes (WAL)	Caernarfon Town (WAL)	End of season	
10 January 2025	GK	Evan Watts (WAL)	Galway United (IRL)	31 December 2025	
14 January 2025	GK	Nathan Broome (ENG)	Port Vale (ENG)	End of season	
17 January 2025	CF	Josh Thomas (WAL)	Drogheda United (IRL)	31 December 2025	
24 January 2025	RW	Kyrell Wilson (ENG)	Yeovil Town (ENG)	End of season	
31 January 2025	CM	Melker Widell (SWE)	AaB (DEN)	End of season	
14 February 2025	AM	Glory Nzingo (IRL)	Carolina Core (USA)	31 December 2025	

=== Released/Out of contract ===
Date	Pos.	Player	Subsequent club	Join date	Ref.
30 June 2024	GK	Archie Matthews (ENG)	Wealdstone (ENG)	1 July 2024	
30 June 2024	LB	Nathanael Ogbeta (ENG)	Plymouth Argyle (ENG)	1 July 2024	
30 June 2024	RB	Cameron Llewellyn (WAL)	Newport County (WAL)	1 July 2024	
30 June 2024	RM	Joe Thomas (WAL)	Newport County (WAL)	1 July 2024	
30 June 2024	GK	Ewan Griffiths (WAL)	Cardiff City (WAL)	4 July 2024	
30 June 2024	CM	Charlie Veevers (ENG)	Burnley (ENG)	11 July 2024	
30 June 2024	LW	Przemysław Płacheta (POL)	Oxford United (ENG)	15 July 2024	
30 June 2024	LB	Lincoln McFayden (ENG)	AFC Fylde (ENG)	17 July 2024	
30 June 2024	CM	Joshua Carey (WAL)	Colwyn Bay (WAL)	1 August 2024	
30 June 2024	CB	Kai Ludvigsen (WAL)	Penybont (WAL)	1 August 2024	
30 June 2024	CF	Ruben Davies (WAL)	Bath City (ENG)	9 August 2024	
30 June 2024	CM	Liam Walsh (ENG)	Luton Town (ENG)	20 August 2024	
30 June 2024	CB	Jack Cooper (WAL)	Cambrian United (WAL)	24 August 2024	
30 June 2024	LB	Kian Jenkins (WAL)	Briton Ferry Llansawel (WAL)	30 August 2024	
30 June 2024	CB	Ben Blythe (ENG)	Bradford (Park Avenue) (ENG)	30 September 2024	
30 June 2024	GK	Remy Mitchell (ENG)	Aylesbury United (ENG)	15 November 2024	
30 June 2024	GK	Lewis Webb (WAL)	Newport County (WAL)	2 January 2025	
30 June 2024	CF	Rohan Davies (WAL)	Baglan Dragons (WAL)	25 January 2025	
24 January 2025	LW	Liam Smith (SCO)	Queen of the South (SCO)	24 January 2025	
3 February 2025	CB	Harry Jones (WAL)			

== Pre-season and friendlies ==
On 4 July, Swansea City announced their first pre-season friendly, against 1. FC Köln as part of a week-long training camp in Austria. Eleven days later, a second fixture in Austria was confirmed, against Vardar.

13 July 2024 Friendly	Swansea City	3–1	Swindon Town	Fairwood
14:00 BST	Cullen 13'; Grimes (pen.); Kukharevych	Report	Brown	Stadium: Swansea City Training Ground; Attendance: 0 (behind-closed-doors)

19 July 2024 Friendly	Swansea City	2–2	Bristol Rovers	Fairwood
17:00 BST	Grimes 2' (pen.); Thomas (?)	Report	Sinclair 9' (?)	Stadium: Swansea City Training Ground; Attendance: 0 (behind-closed-doors)

24 July 2024 Friendly	1. FC Köln	2–1	Swansea City	Bad Waltersdorf, Austria
16:00 CEST (15:00 BST)	Lemperle 10', 14'	Report	Cabango 41'	Stadium: Thermenstadion

27 July 2024 Friendly	Vardar	1–1	Swansea City	Friedberg, Austria
13:00 CEST (12:00 BST)	Dianessy	Report	Franco	Stadium: Sportzentrum Friedberg

3 August 2024 Friendly	Swansea City	3–0	Rio Ave	Landore
15:00 BST	Fulton; Naughton; Grimes	Report		Stadium: Swansea.com Stadium; Attendance: 5,439; Referee: Tom Owen

== Competitions ==
=== Championship ===
==== League table ====
Pos	Team	Pld	W	D	L	GF	GA	GD	Pts
9	West Bromwich Albion	46	15	19	12	57	47	+10	64
10	Middlesbrough	46	18	10	18	64	56	+8	64
11	Swansea City	46	17	10	19	51	56	−5	61
12	Sheffield Wednesday	46	15	13	18	60	69	−9	58
13	Norwich City	46	14	15	17	71	68	+3	57

Source: English Football League
Rules for classification: 1) Points; 2) Goal difference; 3) Number of goals scored; 4) Head-to-head results; 5) Wins; 6) Away goals; 7) Penalty points (sec 9.5); 8) Number of 12-point sending off offences; 9) Play-off (only if needed to determine promotion/relegation)

==== Matches ====
On 26 June, the Championship fixtures were announced.

Win Draw Loss Fixtures

10 August 2024 1	Middlesbrough	1–0	Swansea City	Middlesbrough
12:30 BST	Latte Lath 25' (pen.); Engel (yellow card) 39'	Report	Cabango (yellow card) 14'; Franco (yellow card) 43'; Tymon (yellow card) 76'; Thomas (yellow card) 90+4'	Stadium: Riverside Stadium; Attendance: 26,610; Referee: Sam Allison

17 August 2024 2	Swansea City	3–0	Preston North End	Landore
15:00 BST	Grimes 40'; Abdulai (yellow card) 59', (goal) 61'; Vipotnik 83'	Report	Frøkjær-Jensen (yellow card) 34'; Ledson (yellow card) 43'; Whiteman (yellow card) 63'	Stadium: Swansea.com Stadium; Attendance: 14,037; Referee: Stephen Martin

25 August 2024 3	Swansea City	1–1	Cardiff City	Landore
15:00 BST	Cullen 10'; Allen (yellow card) 90+7'; Darling (yellow card) 90+10'	Report	Robinson 79'; Ng (yellow card) 90+10'; Colwill (yellow card) 90+10'	Stadium: Swansea.com Stadium; Attendance: 20,174; Referee: Oliver Langford
Note: Fixture was initially scheduled for 24 August, but was moved for live Sky Sports broadcast.

31 August 2024 4	West Bromwich Albion	1–0	Swansea City	West Bromwich
15:00 BST	Molumby (yellow card) 10', (goal) 45+1'; Ajayi (yellow card) 20'; Heggem (yellow card) 36'; Palmer (yellow card) 87'	Report	Tymon (yellow card) 87'	Stadium: The Hawthorns; Attendance: 24,975; Referee: Anthony Backhouse

14 September 2024 5	Swansea City	1–0	Norwich City	Landore
15:00 BST	Amankwah 4' (o.g.); Darling (yellow card) 53'; Key (yellow card) 88'	Report	Núñez (yellow card) 45+1'; McLean (yellow card) 48'; Duffy (yellow card) 67'	Stadium: Swansea.com Stadium; Attendance: 14,097; Referee: John Busby

21 September 2024 6	Coventry City	1–2	Swansea City	Coventry
15:00 BST	Ronald 34' (o.g.); Thomas-Asante (yellow card) 52'; Eccles (yellow card) 90'	Report	Cullen 8'; Cooper 32'; Tymon (yellow card) 86'; Franco (yellow card) 86'; Fulton (yellow card) 90+5'	Stadium: Coventry Building Society Arena; Attendance: 26,273; Referee: James Linington

29 September 2024 7	Swansea City	1–1	Bristol City	Landore
15:00 BST	Cabango 15'; Naughton (yellow card) 49'	Report	Twine (yellow card) 56'; Knight 76'; Sykes (yellow card) 90+2'; Wells (yellow card) 90+4'	Stadium: Swansea.com Stadium; Attendance: 16,328; Referee: Josh Smith
Note: Fixture was initially scheduled for 28 September, but was moved for live Sky Sports broadcast.

2 October 2024 8	Sheffield United	1–0	Swansea City	Sheffield
19:45 BST	Hamer (yellow card) 21'; Tymon 44' (o.g.); Souttar (yellow card) 57'; Peck (yellow card) 90+4'	Report	Tymon (yellow card) 31'; Bianchini (yellow card) 82'	Stadium: Bramall Lane; Attendance: 25,112; Referee: Leigh Doughty

5 October 2024 9	Swansea City	0–0	Stoke City	Swansea
15:00 BST		Report	Burger (yellow card) 14'; Moran (yellow card) 63'; Wilmot (yellow card) 90+8'; Gibson (yellow card) 90+10'	Stadium: Swansea.com Stadium; Attendance: 14,546; Referee: Andy Davies

19 October 2024 10	Blackburn Rovers	1–0	Swansea City	Blackburn
15:00 BST	Dolan 13'; Beck (yellow card) 60'	Report	Franco (yellow card) 8'; Key (yellow card) 41'	Stadium: Ewood Park; Attendance: 13,550; Referee: David Webb

22 October 2024 11	Sheffield Wednesday	0–0	Swansea City	Owlerton
19:45 BST		Report	Ronald (yellow card) 7'; Fulton (yellow card) 66'; Darling (yellow card) 87'; Peart-Harris (yellow card) 90+4'	Stadium: Hillsborough Stadium; Attendance: 22,452; Referee: Matt Donohue

26 October 2024 12	Swansea City	0–1	Millwall	Landore
15:00 BST	Cullen (yellow card) 60'	Report	Wintle (yellow card) 40'; Esse (yellow card) 41'; Leonard (yellow card) 89'; De Norre 90'; Ivanović (yellow card) 90+3'	Stadium: Swansea.com Stadium; Attendance: 15,119; Referee: John Busby

2 November 2024 13	Oxford United	1–2	Swansea City	Littlemore
12:30 GMT	Sibley (yellow card) 32'; Scarlett 88'	Report	Vipotnik 38'; Bianchini 80'; Tymon (yellow card) 84'	Stadium: Kassam Stadium; Attendance: 11,454; Referee: Michael Salisbury
Note: Fixture was initially scheduled for a 15:00 kick-off, but was moved for live Sky Sports broadcast.

5 November 2024 14	Swansea City	1–0	Watford	Landore
20:00 GMT	Peart-Harris 35', (yellow card) 79'; Grimes (yellow card) 40'; Franco (yellow card) 44'	Report	Ebosele (yellow card) 26'; Sierralta (yellow card) 45'	Stadium: Swansea.com Stadium; Referee: Josh Smith
Note: Fixture was initially scheduled for a 19:45 kick-off, but was moved for live Sky Sports broadcast.

10 November 2024 15	Burnley	1–0	Swansea City	Burnley
15:00 GMT	J. Cullen (yellow card) 32'; Rodriguez 90+4'	Report	Ronald (yellow card) 61'; L. Cullen (yellow card) 86'; Cabango (yellow card) 90+6'	Stadium: Turf Moor; Referee: David Webb
Note: Fixture was initially scheduled for a 9 November, but was moved due to Burnley playing the Thursday prior.

24 November 2024 16	Swansea City	3–4	Leeds United	Landore
15:00 GMT	Darling 8'; Cullen 45+3'; Bianchini 90'; Peart-Harris; (yellow card) 90+2'	Report	Solomon 20', 73'; Cabango 55' (o.g.); James (yellow card) 53'; Byram (yellow card) 57'; Gnonto 90+1'	Stadium: Swansea.com Stadium; Referee: Dean Whitestone
Note: Fixture was initially scheduled for 23 November, but was moved for live Sky Sports broadcast.

27 November 2024 17	Derby County	1–2	Swansea City	Derby
20:00 GMT	Elder (yellow card) 34'; Mendez-Laing 65' (pen.); Nelson (yellow card) 88'; Thompson (yellow card) 90+1'	Report	Vipotnik 2'; Ronald 14'; Peart-Harris (yellow card) 73'	Stadium: Pride Park Stadium; Attendance: 25,141; Referee: Ben Toner
Note: Fixture was initially scheduled for a 19:45 kick-off, but was moved for live Sky Sports broadcast.

30 November 2024 18	Swansea City	2–2	Portsmouth	Landore
15:00 GMT	Cabango (yellow card) 9'; Cullen (yellow card) 35', (goal) 53'; Ogilvie 45+2' (o.g.)	Report	Pack (yellow card) 1'; Ritchie 25', (yellow card) 35'; Murphy 45'; Blair (yellow card) 71'; Dozzell (yellow card) 83'	Stadium: Swansea.com Stadium; Attendance: 15,404; Referee: Will Finnie

7 December 2024 19	Luton Town	1–1	Swansea City	Luton
15:00 GMT	Adebayo 17'	Report	Grimes 64'	Stadium: Kenilworth Road; Attendance: 11,264; Referee: James Bell

10 December 2024 20	Plymouth Argyle	1–2	Swansea City	Plymouth
19:45 GMT	Bundu 44'	Report	Fulton 44'; Cullen 60'; Key (yellow card) 20'; Peart-Harris (yellow card) 90+3'; Vipotnik (yellow card) 90+4'	Stadium: Home Park; Attendance: 15,305; Referee: Stephen Martin

14 December 2024 21	Swansea City	2–3	Sunderland	Landore
15:00 GMT	Vipotnik 5'; Cullen 17'; Cabango (yellow card) 22'	Report	Bellingham (yellow card) 16', (goal) 75'; Ballard 28'; Cirkin (yellow card) 52'; Neil 73'; Rigg (yellow card) 89'; Isidor (yellow card) 90+2'	Stadium: Swansea.com Stadium; Attendance: 15,791; Referee: Andy Davies

21 December 2024 22	Hull City	2–1	Swansea City	Landore
12:30 GMT	João Pedro 34'; Coyle (yellow card) 43'; Puerta (yellow card) 75'; Burstow 80'; Simons (yellow card) 90+4'	Report	Darling 42'; Grimes (yellow card) 74'; Cullen (yellow card) 90+3'	Stadium: Swansea.com Stadium; Attendance: 20,024; Referee: Thomas Bramall
Note: Fixture was initially scheduled for a 15:00 kick-off, but was moved for live Sky Sports broadcast.

26 December 2024 23	Swansea City	3–0	Queens Park Rangers	Landore
15:00 GMT	Cullen 12', 28', (yellow card) 64'; Franco 33'; Eom Ji-sung (yellow card) 50'	Report	Morgan (yellow card) 34'; Paal (yellow card) 37'; Varane (yellow card) 81'	Stadium: Swansea.com Stadium; Attendance: 15,843; Referee: Ben Toner

29 December 2024 24	Swansea City	2–1	Luton Town	Landore
15:00 GMT	Franco 38'; Peart-Harris 90+1'; Grimes (yellow card) 90+6'	Report	Morris 5'; McGuinness (yellow card) 30'; Johnson (yellow card) 31' (yellow-red card) 68'; Clark (yellow card) 60'	Stadium: Swansea.com Stadium; Attendance: 16,414; Referee: Farai Hallam

1 January 2025 25	Portsmouth	4–0	Swansea City	Milton
15:00 GMT	Murphy 22'; Lane 29'; Pack (yellow card) 44'; Towler 61'; Bishop 78'	Report		Stadium: Fratton Park; Attendance: 20,427; Referee: James Linington

4 January 2025 26	Swansea City	1–1	West Bromwich Albion	Landore
12:30 GMT	Darling (yellow card) 62'; Allen 90+2'; Peart-Harris (yellow card) 90+6'	Report	Diakité (yellow card) 1'; Styles (yellow card) 50'; Molumby (yellow card) 61'; Fellows 66'; Holgate (yellow card) 90+5'	Stadium: Swansea.com Stadium; Attendance: 14,729; Referee: Sam Allison
Note: Fixture was initially scheduled for a 15:00 kick-off, but was moved for live Sky Sports broadcast.

18 January 2025 27	Cardiff City	3–0	Swansea City	Leckwith
12:30 GMT	Robinson 47', 51'; Goutas 67'; Ralls (yellow card) 90'	Report	Grimes (yellow card) 45+5'; Cullen (yellow card) 81'; Bianchini (yellow card) 88'; Cabango (yellow card) 90'	Stadium: Cardiff City Stadium; Attendance: 26,536; Referee: James Bell
Note: Fixture was initially scheduled for a 15:00 kick-off, but was moved for live Sky Sports broadcasting.

21 January 2025 28	Swansea City	1–2	Sheffield United	Landore
19:45 GMT	Bianchini 7'; Darling (red card) 50'; Ronald (yellow card) 65'; Tymon (yellow card) 68'; Cabango (yellow card) 90+4'	Report	Norrington-Davies (yellow card) 20'; Hamer (yellow card) 42'; Brewster 47'; Peck (yellow card) 62'; Burrows 68' (pen.); Ahmedhodžić (yellow card) 83'	Stadium: Swansea.com Stadium; Attendance: 13,373; Referee: Dean Whitestone

25 January 2025 29	Norwich City	5–1	Swansea City	Norwich
12:30 GMT	Sargent 44', 63'; Schwartau (yellow card) 53'; Marcondes (yellow card) 61', (goal) 86'; Dobbin 76'; Crnac 84'	Report	Cullen 62'; Fulton (yellow card) 90+4'	Stadium: Carrow Road; Attendance: 25,713; Referee: Thomas Bramall
Note: Fixture was initially scheduled for a 15:00 kick-off, but was moved for live Sky Sports broadcasting.

1 February 2025 30	Swansea City	0–2	Coventry City	Landore
15:00 GMT	Delcroix (yellow card) 12'; Christie (yellow card) 41'	Report	Simms 17'; Thomas-Asante 44'	Stadium: Swansea.com Stadium; Attendance: 15,189; Referee: Sam Allison

9 February 2025 31	Bristol City	0–1	Swansea City	Ashton Gate
12:00 GMT		Report	Tymon 55'	Stadium: Ashton Gate; Attendance: 21,554; Referee: John Busby
Note: Fixture was initially scheduled for 8 February, but was moved for live Sky Sports broadcasting.

12 February 2025 32	Swansea City	0–1	Sheffield Wednesday	Landore
19:45 GMT		Report	Smith 66'; Cissoko (yellow card) 89'; Chalobah (yellow card) 90'	Stadium: Swansea.com Stadium; Attendance: 14,149; Referee: Elliot Bell

15 February 2025 33	Stoke City	3–1	Swansea City	Stoke-on-Trent
15:00 GMT	Pearson (yellow card) 41'; Burger 64'; Bae Jun-ho 73'; Baker (yellow card) 78', (goal) 90+3'; Moran (yellow card) 85'	Report	Tymon 61'; Cabango (yellow card) 63'	Stadium: Bet365 Stadium; Attendance: 21,256; Referee: Dean Whitestone

22 February 2025 34	Swansea City	3–0	Blackburn Rovers	Landore
15:00 GMT	Vipotnik 39'; Peart-Harris 45+2'; Cullen 62'	Report	Brittain (yellow card) 64'; Dolan (yellow card) 76'	Stadium: Swansea.com Stadium; Attendance: 13,788; Referee: Gavin Ward

4 March 2025 35	Preston North End	0–0	Swansea City	Preston
19:45 GMT		Report		Stadium: Deepdale; Attendance: 12,838; Referee: Stephen Martin
Note: Fixture was initially scheduled for 1 March but was rearranged due to Preston's FA Cup involvements.

8 March 2025 36	Swansea City	1–0	Middlesbrough	Landore
15:00 GMT	Eom Ji-sung 26'; Franco (yellow card) 43'	Report	Dijksteel (yellow card) 28'	Stadium: Swansea.com Stadium; Attendance: 13,986; Referee: Ruebyn Ricardo

12 March 2025 37	Watford	1–0	Swansea City	Watford
19:45 GMT	Sissoko 27'; Louza (yellow card) 42'; Selvik (yellow card) 72'; Kayembe (yellow card) 88'	Report	Cabango (yellow card) 48'; Cullen (yellow card) 88'	Stadium: Vicarage Road; Attendance: 16,739; Referee: Jeremy Simpson

15 March 2025 38	Swansea City	0–2	Burnley	Landore
15:00 GMT	Fulton (yellow card) 74'	Report	Brownhill 4'; Anthony 22'	Stadium: Swansea.com Stadium; Attendance: 13,679; Referee: Oliver Langford

29 March 2025 39	Leeds United	2–2	Swansea City	Leeds
15:00 GMT	Aaronson 1'; Ampadu (yellow card) 34'; Gnonto 86' (yellow card) 87'; Tanaka (yellow card) 90+2'	Report	Delcroix (yellow card) 39'; Darling 64'; Franco (yellow card) 70'; O'Brien (yellow card) 83'; Vipotnik 90+6'; Cullen (yellow card) 90+7'	Stadium: Elland Road; Attendance: 35,574; Referee: Ben Toner

5 April 2025 40	Swansea City	1–0	Derby County	Landore
15:00 BST	Eom Ji-sung 79'	Report	Forsyth (yellow card) 67'; Harness (yellow card) 82'	Stadium: Swansea.com Stadium; Attendance: 16,501; Referee: Andy Davies

9 April 2025 41	Swansea City	3–0	Plymouth Argyle	Landore
19:45 BST	O'Brien 4'; Darling 22'; Key 35'	Report	Randell (yellow card) 21'; Pleguezuelo (yellow card) 72'	Stadium: Swansea.com Stadium; Attendance: 14,978; Referee: Stephen Martin

12 April 2025 42	Sunderland	0–1	Swansea City	Sunderland
15:00 BST	Mepham (yellow card) 31'; Hume (yellow card) 60'	Report	O'Brien (yellow card) 31'; Cabango 58', (yellow card) 74'; Fulton (yellow card) 62'	Stadium: Stadium of Light; Attendance: 42,362; Referee: Farai Hallam

18 April 2025 43	Swansea City	1–0	Hull City	Landore
15:00 BST	Allen (yellow card) 27'; Vipotnik 51' (pen.); Fulton (yellow card) 72'	Report	McLoughlin (yellow card) 3'; Gelhardt (yellow card) 13'; Crooks (yellow card) 86' (yellow-red card) 90+1'	Stadium: Swansea.com Stadium; Attendance: 18,775; Referee: Ben Toner

21 April 2025 44	Queens Park Rangers	1–2	Swansea City	Shepherd's Bush
15:00 BST	Ashby (yellow card) 40'; Dembele 72'		Fox (o.g.); Darling 55'; Tymon (yellow card) 90+1'	Stadium: Loftus Road; Attendance: 16,351; Referee: Tom Nield

26 April 2025 45	Millwall	1–0	Swansea City	Bermondsey
15:00 BST	Saville 38'; Azeez (yellow card) 63'	Report	Eom Ji-sung (yellow card) 32'	Stadium: The Den; Attendance: 17,239; Referee: Benjamin Speedie

3 May 2025 46	Swansea City	3–3	Oxford United	Landore
12:30 BST	Eom Ji-sung 23'; Ronald 57'; Cullen 82'	Report	Leigh 40'; Matos (yellow card) 48'; Helik 62'; Płacheta 90+3'; Brannagan (yellow card) 90+5'	Stadium: Swansea.com Stadium; Attendance: 19,672; Referee: James Bell
Note: Fixture was initially scheduled for a 15:00 kick-off, but all EFL Championship final matchday fixtures were moved to an earlier kick-off.

=== FA Cup ===
Swansea City entered the FA Cup at the third round stage, and were drawn away to Southampton.

Win Draw Loss Fixtures

12 January 2025 Third round	Southampton	3–0	Swansea City	Southampton
16:30 GMT	Sulemana 20'; Dibling 35', 65'; Manning (yellow card) 90+2'	Report	Grimes (yellow card) 60'; Allen (yellow card) 78'	Stadium: St Mary's Stadium; Referee: Tony Harrington

=== EFL Cup ===
On 27 June, the draw for the first round was made, with Swansea being drawn at home against Gillingham. In the second round, they were drawn at home to Wycombe Wanderers.

Win Draw Loss Fixtures

13 August 2024 First round	Swansea City	3–1	Gillingham	Landore
19:45 BST	Pedersen (yellow card) 19'; Ronald 24'; Abdulai (yellow card) 50', (goal) 90+6'; Cullen 70'	Report	Williams (red card) 51'; Hawkins 87'	Stadium: Swansea.com Stadium; Attendance: 6,019; Referee: David Rock

28 August 2024 Second round	Swansea City	0–1	Wycombe Wanderers	Landore
19:45 BST	Bianchini (yellow card) 36'	Report	Kone 40'; Harvie (yellow card) 85'; Hartridge (yellow card) 86'	Stadium: Swansea.com Stadium; Referee: Ben Toner

== Statistics ==
=== Appearances and goals ===
Players with no appearances are not included on the list
Italics indicate a loaned in player

No.	Pos	Nat	Player	Total		Championship		FA Cup		EFL Cup	
No.	Pos	Nat	Player	Apps	Goals	Apps	Goals	Apps	Goals	Apps	Goals
2	DF	(England) ENG	Joshua Key	47	1	39+6	1	1+0	0	0+1	0
3	DF	(Denmark) DEN	Kristian Pedersen	2	0	0+0	0	0+0	0	2+0	0
4	MF	(Scotland) SCO	Jay Fulton	34	1	13+18	1	0+1	0	2+0	0
5	DF	(Wales) WAL	Ben Cabango	47	2	45+0	2	0+0	0	1+1	0
6	DF	(England) ENG	Harry Darling	39	5	38+1	5	0+0	0	0+0	0
7	MF	(Wales) WAL	Joe Allen	27	1	8+17	1	0+1	0	0+1	0
8	MF	(England) ENG	Lewis O'Brien	16	1	16+0	1	0+0	0	0+0	0
9	FW	(Slovenia) SLO	Žan Vipotnik	44	7	23+19	7	0+0	0	2+0	0
10	FW	(South Korea) KOR	Eom Ji-sung	40	3	28+9	3	1+0	0	1+1	0
11	FW	(England) ENG	Josh Ginnelly	4	0	0+3	0	0+1	0	0+0	0
14	DF	(England) ENG	Josh Tymon	48	2	44+1	2	1+0	0	0+2	0
17	MF	(Portugal) POR	Gonçalo Franco	42	2	39+1	2	1+0	0	0+1	0
19	FW	(France) FRA	Florian Bianchini	38	3	8+28	3	1+0	0	1+0	0
20	FW	(Wales) WAL	Liam Cullen	45	12	35+7	11	0+1	0	0+2	1
21	DF	(Indonesia) IDN	Nathan Tjoe-A-On	3	0	0+1	0	0+0	0	2+0	0
22	GK	(Chile) CHI	Lawrence Vigouroux	48	0	46+0	0	0+0	0	2+0	0
23	DF	(England) ENG	Cyrus Christie	12	0	2+9	0	1+0	0	0+0	0
25	MF	(Jamaica) JAM	Myles Peart-Harris	30	3	18+11	3	1+0	0	0+0	0
26	DF	(England) ENG	Kyle Naughton	26	0	9+14	0	1+0	0	2+0	0
28	DF	(Belgium) BEL	Hannes Delcroix	12	0	10+2	0	0+0	0	0+0	0
31	MF	(Wales) WAL	Ollie Cooper	29	1	10+18	1	0+0	0	1+0	0
33	GK	(Scotland) SCO	Jon McLaughlin	1	0	0+0	0	1+0	0	0+0	0
35	FW	(Brazil) BRA	Ronald	49	3	43+3	2	1+0	0	1+1	1
36	MF	(Wales) WAL	Ben Lloyd	2	0	0+2	0	0+0	0	0+0	0
41	DF	(Wales) WAL	Sam Parker	7	0	0+7	0	0+0	0	0+0	0
44	FW	(Wales) WAL	Josh Thomas	1	0	0+1	0	0+0	0	0+0	0
Player(s) who featured whilst on loan but returned to parent club on loan during the season:
32	DF	(England) ENG	Nelson Abbey	1	0	0+0	0	0+0	0	1+0	0
Player(s) who featured but departed the club permanently during the season:
8	MF	(England) ENG	Matt Grimes	32	2	29+0	2	1+0	0	2+0	0
47	MF	(Scotland) SCO	Azeem Abdulai	20	2	2+15	1	0+1	0	2+0	1
