= 2025–26 Swansea City A.F.C. season =

English football club season

Swansea City
2025–26 season
- Owner(s): Swansea Football LLC (majority); Nigel Morris (14.04%); Swansea City Supporters Society Ltd (7.59%)
- Chief executive: Tom Gorringe
- Head coach: Alan Sheehan (until 11 November); Vítor Matos (from 24 November)
- Stadium: Swansea.com Stadium
- Championship: 11th
- FA Cup: Third round
- EFL Cup: Fourth round
- Top goalscorer: League: Žan Vipotnik (23); All: Žan Vipotnik (25)
- Highest home attendance: 20,490 (v. Manchester City, EFL Cup, 29 October 2025)
- Lowest home attendance: 5,095 (v. Crawley Town, EFL Cup, 12 August 2025)
- Average home league attendance: 16,029
- Biggest win: 4–0 (v. Sheffield Wednesday, Championship, 8 February 2026)
- Biggest defeat: 1–4 (v. Ipswich Town, Championship, 8 November 2025); 0–3 (v. Bristol City, Championship, 22 November 2025); 0–3 (v. Ipswich Town, Championship, 28 February 2026); 0–3 (v. Coventry City, Championship, 21 March 2026)
Home colours

The 2025–26 season was the 114th season in the history of Swansea City Association Football Club and their eighth consecutive season in the Championship. In addition to the domestic league, the club also participated in the FA Cup and the EFL Cup.

== Managerial changes ==
On 11 November, Alan Sheehan was sacked as head coach after 32 games in official charge and a win percentage of 40.63%. Thirteen days later, Vítor Matos was appointed as the new head coach on a three-and-a-half-year contract from Marítimo.

== Transfers and contracts ==
=== In ===
Date	Pos.	Player	From	Fee	Ref.
1 June 2025 (Note: The transfer was announced on 5 May, and would become official on 1 June once the transfer window has reopened)	LW	(Sweden) Zeidane Inoussa	(Sweden) BK Häcken	Undisclosed	
1 June 2025 (Note: The transfer was announced on 18 May, and would become official on 1 June once the transfer window has reopened)	CF	(Scotland) Bobby Wales	(Scotland) Kilmarnock	Compensation	
5 June 2025	CB	(Scotland) Blair McKenzie (Note: Signed initially for the Under-21s)	(Scotland) Aberdeen	Undisclosed	
1 July 2025 (Note: The transfer was announced on 14 June, and would become official on 1 July once his contract at Ipswich had expired)	CB	(Australia) Cameron Burgess	(England) Ipswich Town	Free	
1 July 2025 (Note: The transfer was announced on 6 June, and would become official on 1 July once his contract at Bolton had expired)	CB	(Cape Verde) Ricardo Santos	(England) Bolton Wanderers	Free	
4 July 2025	CM	(Northern Ireland) Ethan Galbraith	(England) Leyton Orient	£1,500,000	
10 July 2025	CF	(Wales) Caleb Demery	(Wales) Briton Ferry Llansawel	Undisclosed	
8 August 2025	GK	(England) Evan Anderson	(England) Brentford	Free	
8 August 2025	GK	(England) Paul Farman	(England) Barrow	Free	
20 August 2025	CDM	(New Zealand) Marko Stamenić	(England) Nottingham Forest	Undisclosed	
1 September 2025	CF	(Republic of Ireland) Adam Idah	(Scotland) Celtic	£7,000,000	
9 January 2026	RB	(England) Joel Ward	(England) Crystal Palace	Free	
2 February 2026	GK	(Republic of Ireland) Joe Collins	(Republic of Ireland) Bohemian	Undisclosed	

Expenditure: ▼ ~ £8,500,000 (not inc. any undisclosed transfers)

=== Out ===
Date	Pos.	Player	To	Fee	Ref.
17 June 2025	CF	(Ukraine) Mykola Kukharevych	(Slovakia) Slovan Bratislava	Undisclosed	
1 August 2025	CF	(England) Jerry Yates	(England) Luton Town	Undisclosed	
29 January 2026	CAM	(Republic of Ireland) Glory Nzingo	(Republic of Ireland) St Patrick's Athletic	Free Transfer	

=== Loaned in ===
Date	Pos.	Player	From	Date until	Ref.
6 August 2025	CB	(England) Kaelan Casey	(England) West Ham United	16 January 2026 (Note: On 16 January, Casey was recalled to West Ham United from his initial season-long loan)	
14 August 2025	CM	(Ivory Coast) Malick Yalcouyé	(England) Brighton & Hove Albion	31 May 2026	
2 September 2025	RW	(Angola) Manuel Benson	(England) Burnley	29 January 2026 (Note: On 29 January, Benson was recalled to Burnley from his initial season-long loan)	
2 September 2025	LB	(England) Ishé Samuels-Smith	(England) Chelsea	16 April 2026 (Note: On 16 April, Samuels-Smith returned to parent club Chelsea due to sustaining a hamstring injury which ruled him out for the remainder of the season)	
22 January 2026	LW	(Brazil) Gustavo Nunes	(England) Brentford	31 May 2026	
2 February 2026	CAM	(Finland) Leo Walta	(Sweden) Sirius	31 May 2026 (Note: Includes an obligation to buy)	

=== Loaned out ===
Date	Pos.	Player	To	Date until	Ref.
14 July 2025 (Note: The loan was announced on 20 June, and would become official on 14 July)	GK	(Wales) Kit Margetson	(Wales) Connah's Quay Nomads	31 May 2026	
23 July 2025	CB	(England) Jack Fanning	(Wales) Briton Ferry Llansawel	31 May 2026 (Note: On 13 January, Fanning's loan at Briton Ferry Llansawel was extended until the end of the season)	
28 July 2025	CAM	(Wales) Ben Lloyd	(Wales) Newport County	31 May 2026 (Note: On 13 January, Lloyd's loan at Newport County was extended until the end of the season)	
31 July 2025	RW	(France) Florian Bianchini	(England) Portsmouth	31 May 2026	
8 August 2025	DM	(Wales) Jacob Cook	(Wales) Connah's Quay Nomads	31 May 2026	
22 August 2025	LM	(Wales) Cameron Congreve	(Scotland) Dundee	31 May 2026	
29 August 2025	RW	(England) Kyrell Wilson	(Scotland) Falkirk	31 May 2026	
30 August 2025	LW	(Ecuador) Aimar Govea	(Spain) Girona	27 January 2026 (Note: On 27 January, Govea's initial season-long loan at Girona was terminated)	
1 September 2025	CM	(Wales) Joel Cotterill	(England) Bristol Rovers	6 January 2026 (Note: On 6 January, Cotterill was recalled from his season-long loan at Bristol Rovers)	
1 September 2025	CB	(England) Filip Lissah	(Scotland) Falkirk	31 May 2026	
2 September 2025	CM	(Wales) Mitchell Bates	(Wales) Briton Ferry Llansawel	31 May 2026	
12 December 2025	CM	(Wales) Harlan Perry	(Wales) Cardiff Metropolitan University	12 March 2026	
12 December 2025	CB	(Wales) Brogan Popham	(Wales) Cardiff Metropolitan University	12 March 2026	
8 January 2026	LB	(Wales) Sebastian Dabrowski	(England) Chippenham Town	31 May 2026	
14 January 2026	CM	(Wales) Joel Cotterill	(Scotland) Dundee	31 May 2026	
19 January 2026	CF	(Wales) Josh Thomas	(Republic of Ireland) Derry City	30 June 2026	
23 January 2026	CB	(England) Arthur Parker	(Republic of Ireland) Galway United	30 June 2026	
23 January 2026	GK	(Wales) Evan Watts	(Republic of Ireland) Galway United	30 June 2026	
2 February 2026	CF	(Scotland) Bobby Wales	(England) Huddersfield Town	31 May 2026	

=== Released/Out of contract ===
Date	Pos.	Player	Subsequent club	Join date	Ref.
30 June 2025	CB	(England) Harry Darling	(England) Norwich City	1 July 2025	
30 June 2025	GK	(Wales) Ben Hughes	(England) Cambridge United	1 July 2025	
30 June 2025	RB	(Wales) Osian Williams	(Wales) Baglan Dragons	18 July 2025	
30 June 2025	LB	(Indonesia) Nathan Tjoe-A-On	(Netherlands) Willem II	21 July 2025	
30 June 2025	CF	(Kenya) Sammy Henia-Kamau	(England) Hull City	31 July 2025	
30 June 2025	AM	(Wales) Aidan Higgins	(Wales) Denbigh Town	2 August 2025	
30 June 2025	RB	(Republic of Ireland) Cyrus Christie	(England) Bolton Wanderers	1 September 2025	
30 June 2025	GK	(Scotland) Jon McLaughlin	(England) Middlesbrough	1 September 2025	
30 June 2025	LB	(Denmark) Kristian Pedersen	(Denmark) Fredericia	18 September 2025	
30 June 2025	RW	(Guyana) Maliq Cadogan	(England) Peterborough Sports	20 September 2025	
30 June 2025	CB	(England) Richard Faakye	(England) Peterborough Sports	20 September 2025	
30 June 2025	CB	(Wales) Kiel Higginson	(United States) Butler Bulldogs	July 2025	
30 June 2025	GK	(Wales) Sam Seager	(Wales) Cardiff Metropolitan University	7 August 2025	
30 June 2025	CM	(Wales) Joe Allen	Retired		
30 June 2025	RB	(England) Kyle Naughton	Retired		
22 July 2025	GK	(England) Nathan Broome	(England) Bolton Wanderers	22 July 2025	
2 September 2025	LW	(England) Josh Ginnelly	(Azerbaijan) Turan Tovuz	24 January 2026	
2 February 2026	RB	(England) Zac Jeanes	(England) Worthing	14 February 2026	

=== New contract ===
Date	Pos.	Player	Contract until	Ref.
24 June 2025	CB	(England) Jack Fanning	30 June 2026	
11 July 2025	CM	(Wales) Ramon Rees-Siso	30 June 2027 (Note: First professional contract) (Note: Option of an additional year)	
14 July 2025	DM	(Wales) Callum Deacon	30 June 2026	
16 July 2025	RB	(Wales) Thomas Searle	Undisclosed	
19 July 2025	RW	(England) Josh Pescatore	30 June 2027	
25 July 2025	CF	(Wales) Morgan Bates	30 June 2027	
28 July 2025	CAM	(Wales) Ben Lloyd	30 June 2027	
22 August 2025	LM	(Wales) Cameron Congreve	30 June 2028	
1 September 2025	CM	(Wales) Joel Cotterill	30 June 2027	
3 October 2025	LB	(England) Josh Tymon	30 June 2029	
3 October 2025	GK	(Chile) Lawrence Vigouroux	30 June 2028	
13 January 2026	CB	(England) Jack Fanning	30 June 2027	
12 February 2026	GK	(England) Andy Fisher	30 June 2028	
12 February 2026	CM	(Scotland) Jay Fulton	30 June 2028	
13 February 2026	RW	(Wales) Yori Griffith	30 June 2029	
2 March 2026	CAM	(Wales) Thomas Woodward	30 June 2029	
5 March 2026	CB	(Wales) Iestyn Jones	30 June 2028	
20 March 2026	CF	(Slovenia) Žan Vipotnik	30 June 2030	

== Pre-season and friendlies ==
On 30 April, Swansea City announced they would face Exeter City in a pre-season testimonial for Pierce Sweeney. A week-long training camp in Murcia was also confirmed, along with a friendly against Stevenage. A third friendly was later added, against Cheltenham Town. On 19 June, a home friendly against Ligue 1 side Lorient was announced.

Win Draw Loss Fixtures

12 July 2025 Friendly	Swansea City	5–0	Kidderminster Harriers	Fairwood
15:00 BST	Franco (x2); Ronald; Inoussa; Eom Ji-sung	Report		Stadium: Fairwood Training Ground; Attendance: 0 (behind-closed-doors)

19 July 2025 Friendly	Swansea City	3–2	Stevenage	San Pedro del Pinatar, Spain
12:00 CEST	Trialist 5' (o.g.); Wales 38'; Vipotnik 66'	Report	Sweeney 47'; Trialist 57'	Stadium: Pinatar Arena

23 July 2025 Friendly	Cheltenham Town	2–1	Swansea City	Cheltenham
19:00 BST	Trialist 49'; Angol 80'	Report	Willcox 54' (o.g.)	Stadium: Whaddon Road; Attendance: 1,820 (905 away); Referee: John Durkin

26 July 2025 Friendly	Exeter City	1–0	Swansea City	Exeter
13:00 BST	Cox 47'	Report		Stadium: St James Park; Attendance: 3,948 (626 away)

2 August 2025 Friendly	Swansea City	1–3	Lorient	Landore
15:00 BST	Cullen 64'	Report	Pagis 23', 31'; Bamba 42' (pen.)	Stadium: Swansea.com Stadium; Attendance: 6,063; Referee: Iwan Griffith

== Competitions ==
=== Overall record ===
Competition	First match	Last match	Starting round	Final position	Record							
Competition	First match	Last match	Starting round	Final position	Pld	W	D	L	GF	GA	GD	Win %
Championship	9 August 2025	2 May 2026	Matchday 1	11th	46	18	10	18	57	59	−2	39.13
FA Cup	11 January 2026		Third round	Third round	1	0	1	0	2	2	+0	0.00
EFL Cup	12 August 2025	29 October 2025	First round	Fourth round	4	2	1	1	8	7	+1	50.00
Total					51	20	12	19	67	68	−1	39.22

Source: Soccerway

=== Championship ===
==== League table ====
Pos	Team	Pld	W	D	L	GF	GA	GD	Pts
9	Norwich City	46	19	8	19	63	56	+7	65
10	Birmingham City	46	17	13	16	57	56	+1	64
11	Swansea City	46	18	10	18	57	59	−2	64
12	Bristol City	46	17	11	18	59	59	0	62
13	Sheffield United	46	18	6	22	66	66	0	60

Source: EFL Official Website
Rules for classification: 1) Points; 2) Goal difference; 3) Number of goals scored; 4) Head-to-head results; 5) Wins; 6) Away goals; 7) Penalty points (sec 9.5); 8) Number of 12-point sending off offences; 9) Play-off (only if needed to determine promotion/relegation)

==== Results summary ====
Overall								Home						Away					
Pld	W	D	L	GF	GA	GD	Pts	W	D	L	GF	GA	GD	W	D	L	GF	GA	GD
46	18	10	18	57	59	−2	64	11	6	6	34	27	+7	7	4	12	23	32	−9

Source: Soccerway

==== Results by round ====
Round	1	2	3	4	5	6	7	8	9	10	11	12	13	14	15	16	17	18	19	20	21	22	23	24	25	26	27	28	29	30	31	32	33	34	35	36	37	38	39	40	41	42	43	44	45	46
Ground	A	H	H	A	H	A	H	A	H	A	H	H	A	A	H	A	H	A	H	H	A	H	A	A	H	A	H	H	A	A	H	A	H	H	A	H	A	A	H	A	H	A	H	A	A	H
Result	L	W	D	W	D	L	D	W	L	D	L	W	D	L	L	L	L	L	W	W	L	W	L	W	W	L	D	W	L	W	W	L	W	D	L	W	W	L	L	D	D	W	L	W	D	W
Position	21	15	13	7	7	11	13	8	12	13	16	13	16	17	18	20	19	21	20	18	19	19	20	18	16	17	16	16	16	15	15	16	15	15	16	14	11	11	14	16	15	14	15	10	11	11
Points	0	3	4	7	8	8	9	12	12	13	13	16	17	17	17	17	17	17	20	23	23	26	26	29	32	32	33	36	36	39	42	42	45	46	46	49	52	52	52	53	54	57	57	60	61	64

Source: Soccerway
A = Away; H = Home; W = Win; D = Draw; L = Loss

==== Matches ====
On 26 June, the Championship fixtures were released.

Win Draw Loss Fixtures

9 August 2025 1	Middlesbrough	1–0	Swansea City	Middlesbrough
15:00 BST	Silvera (yellow card) 10'; Fry 51'; Ayling (yellow card) 90+7'	Report	Fulton (yellow card) 29'; Franco (yellow card) 41'; Galbraith (yellow card) 60'; Burgess (yellow card) 90+6'; Cullen (yellow card) 90+7'	Stadium: Riverside Stadium; Attendance: 26,036 (685 away); Referee: Farai Hallam

16 August 2025 2	Swansea City	1–0	Sheffield United	Swansea
15:00 BST	Ronald (yellow card) 23', (goal) 66'	Report	Hamer (yellow card) 16'; Campbell (yellow card) 45+5'; Soumaré (yellow card) 70'	Stadium: Swansea.com Stadium; Attendance: 15,816; Referee: Thomas Kirk

23 August 2025 3	Swansea City	1–1	Watford	Swansea
12:30 BST	Stamenić (yellow card) 54'; Vipotnik 82'; Galbraith (yellow card) 90+4'; Tymon (yellow card) 90+7'	Report	Irankunda 35'; Kyprianou (yellow card) 39'; Ngakia (yellow card) 70'; Morris (yellow card) 90+4'; Andrews (yellow card) 90+9'; Baah (yellow card) 90+10'	Stadium: Swansea.com Stadium; Attendance: 15,543; Referee: Stephen Martin
Note: Fixture was originally scheduled for a 15:00 kick-off, but was moved live Sky Sports broadcasting.

30 August 2025 4	Sheffield Wednesday	0–2	Swansea City	Sheffield
15:00 BST		Report	Franco (yellow card) 30'; Galbraith (yellow card) 34'; Vipotnik 50'; Ronald 81'	Stadium: Hillsborough Stadium; Attendance: 19,740; Referee: Anthony Backhouse

13 September 2025 5	Swansea City	2–2	Hull City	Swansea
15:00 BST	Vipotnik 40'; Tymon (yellow card) 52'; Ronald 57'	Report	McBurnie 45'; Hughes (yellow card) 88'; Egan 90+7'	Stadium: Swansea.com Stadium; Attendance: 15,152; Referee: David Webb

20 September 2025 6	Birmingham City	1–0	Swansea City	Birmingham
12:30 BST	Klarer (yellow card) 12'; Allsop (yellow card) 18'; Gray (yellow card) 34'; Osayi-Samuel (yellow card) 40'; Paik (yellow card) 83'; Dykes 90+4'	Report	Inoussa (yellow card) 56'; Tymon (yellow card) 82'; Cabango (yellow card) 86'; Stamenić (yellow card) 90+4'	Stadium: St. Andrew's; Attendance: 27,441; Referee: John Busby
Note: Fixture was originally scheduled for a 15:00 kick-off, but was moved live Sky Sports broadcasting.

27 September 2025 7	Swansea City	1–1	Millwall	Swansea
12:30 BST	Vipotnik 12'; Cabango (yellow card) 23'	Report	Coburn 45+1'; Bryan (yellow card) 62'; Leonard (yellow card) 81'	Stadium: Swansea.com Stadium; Attendance: 14,942; Referee: Dean Whitestone
Note: Fixture was originally scheduled for a 15:00 kick-off, but was moved live Sky Sports broadcasting.

30 September 2025 8	Blackburn Rovers	1–2	Swansea City	Blackburn
19:45 BST	Cantwell 28'; McLoughlin (yellow card) 36'; Tronstad (yellow card) 79'; Cantwell (yellow card) 87'	Report	Franco 44'; Cullen 67'; Tymon (yellow card) 72'; Burgess (yellow card) 75'	Stadium: Ewood Park; Attendance: 11,013; Referee: Leigh Doughty

4 October 2025 9	Swansea City	1–3	Leicester City	Swansea
15:00 BST	Idah 70' (pen.); Cabango (yellow card) 71'; Burgess (yellow card) 82'	Report	James 13'; Thomas (yellow card) 76'; Fatawu 77'; Vestergaard 85'	Stadium: Swansea.com Stadium; Attendance: 16,601; Referee: David Webb

18 October 2025 10	Southampton	0–0	Swansea City	Southampton
12:30 BST		Report	Stamenić (yellow card) 34'; Cabango (yellow card) 43'; Vipotnik (yellow card) 50'; Fulton (yellow card) 90+6'	Stadium: St Mary's Stadium; Attendance: 27,256; Referee: Josh Smith
Note: Fixture was originally scheduled for a 15:00 kick-off, but was rescheduled for live Sky Sports broadcasting.

22 October 2025 11	Swansea City	0–1	Queens Park Rangers	Swansea
19:45 BST	Yalcouyé (red card) 34'; Idah (yellow card) 41'	Report	Burrell 18'; Dunne (yellow card) 29'; Cook (yellow card) 35'; Kone (yellow card) 87'; Chair (yellow card) 90+2'	Stadium: Swansea.com Stadium; Attendance: 14,254; Referee: John Busby

25 October 2025 12	Swansea City	2–1	Norwich City	Swansea
15:00 BST	Vipotnik 6'; Cullen (yellow card) 45+1'; Stamenić (yellow card) 66'; Vipotnik 69'; Burgess (yellow card) 90+7'	Report	Makama 42'; Mattsson (yellow card) 65'	Stadium: Swansea.com Stadium; Attendance: 14,729; Referee: Adam Herczeg

1 November 2025 13	Charlton Athletic	1–1	Swansea City	Swansea
15:00 GMT	Kelman 46'	Report	Idah 64'	Stadium: Swansea.com Stadium; Attendance: 20,405; Referee: David Webb

5 November 2025 14	Preston North End	2–1	Swansea City	Preston
19:45 GMT	Small 8', (yellow card) 61'; Whiteman (yellow card) 48'; Osmajić 49'; Hughes (yellow card) 82'	Report	Eom Ji-sung 80'; Samuels-Smith (yellow card) 90+2'	Stadium: Deepdale; Attendance: 15,911; Referee: Anthony Backhouse

8 November 2025 15	Swansea City	1–4	Ipswich Town	Swansea
15:00 GMT	Tymon (yellow card) 26'; Inoussa (yellow card) 30'; Galbraith (yellow card) 33'; Samuels-Smith (yellow card) 34'; Franco 50'; Cabango (yellow card) 71'	BBC report	Núñez (yellow card) 24'; J. Clarke 36'; Burgess 55', 81' (o.g.); Taylor (yellow card) 70'; Azón 76'; Matusiwa (yellow card) 80'	Stadium: Swansea.com Stadium; Attendance: 16,783; Referee: Edward Duckworth

22 November 2025 16	Bristol City	3–0	Swansea City	Bristol
12:30 GMT	Dickie 4'; Riis 31'; McCrorie (yellow card) 49'; Randell (yellow card) 52'; Hirakawa 82'	Report		Stadium: Ashton Gate; Attendance: 23,842; Referee: Josh Smith
Note: Fixture was originally scheduled for a 15:00 kick-off, but was following safety requests from both clubs.

25 November 2025 17	Swansea City	1–2	Derby County	Landore
19:45 GMT	Galbraith 90'	Report	Ward 34'; Salvesen 53'; Brereton Díaz (yellow card) 82'; Elder (yellow card) 90+4'	Stadium: Swansea.com Stadium; Attendance: 14,251; Referee: Andrew Kitchen

29 November 2025 18	West Bromwich Albion	3–2	Swansea City	West Bromwich
15:00 GMT	Heggebø 47', 52'; Molumby 85'	BBC report	Vipotnik 1'; Galbraith 11'	Stadium: The Hawthorns; Attendance: 22,200; Referee: Tom Nield

6 December 2025 19	Swansea City	2–0	Oxford United	Landore
15:00 GMT	Stamenić 40'; Tymon (yellow card) 43', (goal) 45+4'; Franco (yellow card) 61'	Report	Harris (yellow card) 43'; Krastev (yellow card) 45'; Currie (yellow card) 75'; Lankshear (yellow card) 84'	Stadium: Swansea.com Stadium; Attendance: 17,318; Referee: Anthony Backhouse

9 December 2025 20	Swansea City	1–0	Portsmouth	Landore
19:45 GMT	Cabango (yellow card) 13'; Franco (yellow card) 45+1'; Cullen 78'	Report	Swift (yellow card) 61'; Williams (yellow card) 66'; Pack (yellow card) 90+3'	Stadium: Swansea.com Stadium; Attendance: 18,163; Referee: Tom Reeves

13 December 2025 21	Stoke City	2–1	Swansea City	Stoke-on-Trent
12:30 GMT	Thomas (yellow card) 27', (goal) 60'; Pearson 42', (yellow card) 44'; Tchamadeu (yellow card) 85'	Report	Cullen (yellow card) 17'; Stamenić (yellow card) 53'; Franco (yellow card) 55'; Vipotnik 77'; Widell (yellow card) 90+2'	Stadium: bet365 Stadium; Attendance: 23,089; Referee: Ruebyn Ricardo
Note: Fixture was originally scheduled for a 15:00 kick-off, but was rescheduled for live Sky Sports broadcasting.

19 December 2025 22	Swansea City	2–1	Wrexham	Swansea
20:00 GMT	Stamenić (yellow card) 20'; Vipotnik 70'; Galbraith (yellow card) 72'; Idah 90+1'		Burgess , 14' (o.g.); Thomason (yellow card) 18'; McClean (yellow card) 42'	Stadium: Swansea.com Stadium; Attendance: 20,368; Referee: Oliver Langford
Note: Fixture was originally scheduled for 20 December, but was rescheduled for live Sky Sports broadcasting.

26 December 2025 23	Coventry City	1–0	Swansea City	Foleshill
15:00 GMT	Mason-Clark 44'	Report	Stamenić (yellow card) 11'; Inoussa (yellow card) 63'	Stadium: Coventry Building Society Arena; Attendance: 30,139; Referee: Sam Allison

29 December 2025 24	Oxford United	0–1	Swansea City	Littlemore
19:45 GMT	Goodrham (yellow card) 13'; Currie (yellow card) 69'	Report	Vipotnik 13'; Widell (yellow card) 35'; Inoussa (yellow card) 53'; Stamenić (yellow card) 73'; Eom Ji-sung (yellow card) 75'	Stadium: Kassam Stadium; Attendance: 11,413; Referee: Adam Herczeg

1 January 2026 25	Swansea City	1–0	West Bromwich Albion	Landore
15:00 GMT	Tymon (yellow card) 68'; Fulton 74', (yellow card) 90+4'	Report	Campbell (yellow card) 2'; Styles (yellow card) 26'; Mowatt (yellow card) 31'; Iling-Junior (yellow card) 45'; Diakité (yellow card) 53'	Stadium: Swansea.com Stadium; Attendance: 17,416; Referee: James Linington

4 January 2026 26	Millwall	2–1	Swansea City	Bermondsey
15:00 GMT	Ivanović 38'; Neghli (yellow card) 66'; Sturge (yellow card) 72'; Taylor 90+2'	Report	Cabango 47'	Stadium: The Den; Attendance: 14,242 (953 away); Referee: John Busby

17 January 2026 27	Swansea City	1–1	Birmingham City	Landore
17:30 GMT	Vipotnik 21'	Report	Roberts 72'	Stadium: Swansea.com Stadium; Attendance: 16,753; Referee: Tom Nield
Note: Fixture was initially scheduled for a 15:00 kick-off, but was rescheduled for live Sky Sports broadcasting.

20 January 2026 28	Swansea City	3–1	Blackburn Rovers	Landore
19:45 GMT	Vipotnik 21', 63' O'Riordan 50' (o.g.)	Report	Jørgensen 35'	Stadium: Swansea.com Stadium; Attendance: 13,897; Referee: Anthony Blackhouse

24 January 2026 29	Hull City	2–1	Swansea City	Kingston upon Hull
15:00 GMT	McBurnie 24' (pen.); Famewo (yellow card) 32'; Slater 39'; Millar (yellow card) 48'; Dowell (yellow card) 90+4'	Report	Burgess (yellow card) 22'; Cullen 59'; Key (yellow card) 70'	Stadium: MKM Stadium; Attendance: 21,912; Referee: Josh Smith

31 January 2026 30	Watford	0–2	Swansea City	Watford
15:00 GMT	Louza (yellow card) 53'; Irankunda (red card) 90+2'	Report	Burgess (yellow card) 7'; Stamenić 55'; Key 80'; Cullen (yellow card) 90+2'	Stadium: Vicarage Road; Attendance: 18,691; Referee: Matt Corlett

8 February 2026 31	Swansea City	4–0	Sheffield Wednesday	Landore
12:01 GMT	Cabango (yellow card) 12'; Franco 19'; Stamenić (yellow card) 42'; Vipotnik 70', 79'; Yalcouyé 88'	Report	Heskey (yellow card) 69'; Nakamba (yellow card) 90'	Stadium: Swansea.com Stadium; Attendance: 16,776; Referee: Thomas Kirk
Note: Fixture was initially scheduled for 7 February, but was rescheduled for live Sky Sports broadcasting.

14 February 2026 32	Derby County	2–0	Swansea City	Derby
15:00 GMT	Agyemang (yellow card) 27', (goal) 67'; Brewster 47'; Clarke (yellow card) 51'	Report	Stamenić (yellow card) 44'; Cabango (yellow card) 76'	Stadium: Pride Park Stadium; Attendance: 27,841; Referee: Andrew Kitchen

21 February 2026 33	Swansea City	1–0	Bristol City	Swansea
15:00 GMT	Vipotnik 26'; Widell (yellow card) 44'; Fulton (yellow card) 87'	Report	Earthy (yellow card) 45+1'; Armstrong (yellow card) 72'; Bird (yellow card) 90'; Twine (yellow card) 90+2'	Stadium: Swansea.com Stadium; Attendance: 18,009; Referee: Will Finnie
Note: Fixture was originally scheduled for a 15:00 kick-off, but was following safety requests from both clubs.

24 February 2026 34	Swansea City	1–1	Preston North End	Landore
19:45 GMT	Tymon (yellow card) 56'; Key (yellow card) 82'; Cullen (yellow card) 90+5'	Report	Jebbison 26'; Dobbin (yellow card) 64'; McCann (yellow card) 88'	Stadium: Swansea.com Stadium; Attendance: 20,233; Referee: David Webb

28 February 2026 35	Ipswich Town	3–0	Swansea City	Ipswich
15:00 GMT	Mehmeti 3', (yellow card) 39'; Azón 41'; Hirst 74'	Report		Stadium: Portman Road; Attendance: 27,594; Referee: Anthony Backhouse

7 March 2026 36	Swansea City	2–0	Stoke City	Landore
15:00 GMT	Ronald (yellow card) 34'; Vipotnik 53'; Franco (yellow card) 67'; Cullen 90+2'	Report	Thomas (yellow card) 23' (yellow-red card) 36'; Cissé (yellow card) 30'; Talovierov (yellow card) 79'; Tchamadeu (yellow card) 85'	Stadium: Swansea.com Stadium; Attendance: 16,147; Referee: Ruebyn Ricardo

10 March 2026 37	Portsmouth	1–2	Swansea City	Milton
19:45 GMT	Brown 64'; Dia (yellow card) 69'	Report	Galbraith 26'; Vipotnik (yellow card) 33'; Key 39'; Ward (yellow card) 71'	Stadium: Fratton Park; Attendance: 18,508 (536 away); Referee: Gavin Ward

13 March 2026 38	Wrexham	2–0	Swansea City	Wrexham
20:00 GMT	Broadhead 25'; Cullen 88' (o.g.)	Report	Yalcouyé (yellow card) 62'; Tymon (yellow card) 77'	Stadium: Racecourse Ground; Attendance: 10,641 (1,283 away); Referee: Tom Nield
Note: Fixture was initially scheduled for 14 March, but was rearranged for Sky Sports broadcasting.

21 March 2026 39	Swansea City	0–3	Coventry City	Landore
17:15 GMT	Galbraith (yellow card) 30'; Fulton (yellow card) 31'; Stamenić (yellow card) 89'	Report	Thomas-Asante 32' (pen.); Grimes 38'; Sakamoto 43'; Onyeka (yellow card) 72'	Stadium: Swansea.com Stadium; Attendance: 17,732; Referee: Stephen Martin
Note: Fixture was initially scheduled for a 15:00 kick-off, but was pushed back for Sky Sports broadcasting.

3 April 2026 40	Sheffield United	3–3	Swansea City	Sheffield
15:00 BST	Hamer 16'; Burrows 53'; Cannon 64'; Seriki (yellow card) 90+3'	Report	Vipotnik 24' (pen.); Yalcouyé (yellow card) 45'; Idah 75'; Eom Ji-sung 82'	Stadium: Bramall Lane; Attendance: 26,457; Referee: Dean Whitestone

6 April 2026 41	Swansea City	2–2	Middlesbrough	Landore
17:30 BST	Vipotnik 20' (pen.); Vipotnik 45+4' (pen.); Franco (yellow card) 24'; Eom (yellow card) 65'; Yalcouyé (yellow card) 90+5'	Report	Bangura 12'; McGree (yellow card) 45+5'; Browne (yellow card) 62'; Conway 75' (pen.); Conway (yellow card) 90'	Stadium: Swansea.com Stadium
Note: Fixture was initially scheduled for a 15:00 kick-off, but was pushed back for Sky Sports broadcasting.

11 April 2026 42	Leicester City	0–1	Swansea City	Leicester
15:00 BST	Vestergaard (yellow card) 10'; Thomas (yellow card) 59'	Report	Vipotnik 53'	Stadium: King Power Stadium; Attendance: 27,386; Referee: Sam Allison

18 April 2026 43	Swansea City	1–2	Southampton	Landore
15:00 BST	Stamenić 20'; Franco (yellow card) 23'; Widell (yellow card) 25'	Report	Azaz (yellow card) 18'; Downes (yellow card) 25'; Charles 57'; Archer 90'	Stadium: Swansea.com Stadium; Attendance: 17,776; Referee: Oliver Langford

22 April 2026 44	Queens Park Rangers	1–2	Swansea City	Shepherd's Bush
19:45 BST	Morgan (yellow card) 23'; Adamson (yellow card) 55'; Norrington-Davies (yellow card) 60', (goal) 90'	Report	Ronald 2', (yellow card) 90+2'; Vipotnik 80' (pen.)	Stadium: Loftus Road; Attendance: 13,835; Referee: Leigh Doughty

25 April 2026 45	Norwich City	1–1	Swansea City	Norwich
15:00 BST	Mattsson (yellow card) 59'; Fisher (yellow card) 64'; Ahmed (yellow card) 69'; McLean 83' (pen.)	Report	Stamenić (yellow card) 25'; Eom Ji-sung (yellow card) 43'; Vipotnik 53' (pen.); Tymon (yellow card) 67'; Widell (yellow card) 78'; Vigouroux (yellow card) 81'	Stadium: Carrow Road; Attendance: 26,454; Referee: Thomas Parsons

2 May 2026 46	Swansea City	3–1	Charlton Athletic	Landore
12:30 BST	Idah 74', 82'; Walta 88'	Report	Leaburn 79'	Stadium: Swansea.com Stadium; Attendance: 19,245; Referee: Will Finnie

=== FA Cup ===
Swansea were drawn at home to West Bromwich Albion in the third round.

Win Draw Loss Fixtures

11 January 2026 Third round	Swansea City	2–2 (a.e.t.) (5–6 p)	West Bromwich Albion	Landore
14:30 GMT	Eom Ji-sung 48'; Inoussa 112'	Report	Maja 53'; Wallace 108'	Stadium: Swansea.com Stadium; Attendance: 9,918; Referee: Elliot Bell
	Penalties
	Cabango (penalty scored); Fulton (penalty scored); Galbraith (penalty scored); Burgess (penalty scored); Inoussa (penalty scored); Wales (penalty missed); Yalcouyé (penalty missed)		Heggebø (penalty scored); Price (penalty scored); Styles (penalty scored); Grant (penalty scored); Wallace (penalty scored); Mepham (penalty missed); Bostock (penalty scored)

=== EFL Cup ===
Swansea were drawn at home to Crawley Town in the first round, Plymouth Argyle in the second round, Nottingham Forest in the third round and Manchester City in the fourth round.

Win Draw Loss Fixtures

12 August 2025 First round	Swansea City	3–1	Crawley Town	Landore
19:00 BST	Ronald 4'; Wales 67'; Galbraith 90+4'	Report	Flint (yellow card) 54'; Tshimanga 75'; Holohan (red card) 83'	Stadium: Swansea.com Stadium; Attendance: 5,095; Referee: Benjamin Speedie

26 August 2025 Second round	Swansea City	1–1 (5–3 p)	Plymouth Argyle	Landore
19:45 BST	Vipotnik 22'; Fulton (yellow card) 80'		Sarpong-Wiredu 45'; Roberts (yellow card) 76'	Stadium: Swansea.com Stadium; Attendance: 7,279; Referee: Elliot Bell
	Penalties
	Vipotnik (penalty scored); Galbraith (penalty scored); Cullen (penalty scored); Cabango (penalty scored); Widell (penalty scored)		(penalty scored) Tolaj; (penalty missed) Sorinola; (penalty scored) Watts; (penalty scored) Mumba

17 September 2025 Third round	Swansea City	3–2	Nottingham Forest	Landore
20:00 BST	Galbraith (yellow card) 31'; Burgess (yellow card) 55', (goal) 68', 90+7'; Key (yellow card) 58'; Widell (yellow card) 88'; Vipotnik 90+3'	Report	Igor Jesus 15', 45+1'; Savona (yellow card) 54'; Gibbs-White (yellow card) 74'	Stadium: Swansea.com Stadium; Attendance: 11,354; Referee: Bobby Madley

29 October 2025 Fourth round	Swansea City	1–3	Manchester City	Landore
19:45 GMT	Franco 12'; Idah (yellow card) 22'	Report	Aït-Nouri (yellow card) 17'; Doku 39'; Marmoush 77'; Cherki 90+3'	Stadium: Swansea.com Stadium; Attendance: 20,490; Referee: Jarred Gillett

== Statistics ==
=== Appearances and goals ===
Players with no appearances are not included on the list; italics indicate a loaned in player

No.	Pos	Nat	Player	Total		Championship		FA Cup		EFL Cup	
No.	Pos	Nat	Player	Apps	Goals	Apps	Goals	Apps	Goals	Apps	Goals
1	GK	(England) ENG	Andy Fisher	6	0	1+0	0	1+0	0	4+0	0
2	DF	(England) ENG	Joshua Key	34	2	22+8	2	0+1	0	2+1	0
4	MF	(Scotland) SCO	Jay Fulton	34	1	13+18	1	0+1	0	1+1	0
5	DF	(Wales) WAL	Ben Cabango	47	1	45+0	1	1+0	0	0+1	0
6	MF	(New Zealand) NZL	Marko Stamenić	38	3	29+7	3	1+0	0	1+0	0
7	MF	(Sweden) SWE	Melker Widell	43	0	18+20	0	1+0	0	3+1	0
8	MF	(Ivory Coast) CIV	Malick Yalcouyé	36	1	10+23	1	0+1	0	1+1	0
9	FW	(Slovenia) SLO	Žan Vipotnik	49	25	35+9	23	1+0	0	2+2	2
10	FW	(South Korea) KOR	Eom Ji-sung	48	3	31+13	2	1+0	1	2+1	0
14	DF	(England) ENG	Josh Tymon	50	1	44+1	1	1+0	0	3+1	0
15	DF	(Australia) AUS	Cameron Burgess	51	2	46+0	0	0+1	0	4+0	2
17	MF	(Portugal) POR	Gonçalo Franco	49	4	39+6	3	1+0	0	2+1	1
18	FW	(Brazil) BRA	Gustavo Nunes	12	0	5+7	0	0+0	0	0+0	0
20	FW	(Wales) WAL	Liam Cullen	43	5	17+23	5	0+0	0	0+3	0
21	MF	(Finland) FIN	Leo Walta	10	1	3+7	1	0+0	0	0+0	0
22	GK	(Chile) CHI	Lawrence Vigouroux	45	0	45+0	0	0+0	0	0+0	0
23	DF	(Cape Verde) CPV	Ricardo Santos	1	0	0+1	0	0+0	0	0+0	0
24	FW	(Scotland) SCO	Bobby Wales	6	1	0+4	0	0+1	0	0+1	1
25	DF	(England) ENG	Joel Ward	16	0	3+12	0	0+1	0	0+0	0
27	FW	(Sweden) SWE	Zeidane Inoussa	29	1	12+13	0	0+1	1	3+0	0
30	MF	(Northern Ireland) NIR	Ethan Galbraith	44	4	36+3	3	1+0	0	3+1	1
31	MF	(Wales) WAL	Oli Cooper	2	0	0+1	0	0+0	0	1+0	0
33	FW	(Republic of Ireland) IRL	Adam Idah	27	6	6+19	6	0+0	0	2+0	0
35	FW	(Brazil) BRA	Ronald	49	5	35+10	4	1+0	0	1+2	1
41	DF	(Wales) WAL	Sam Parker	6	0	4+0	0	0+0	0	2+0	0
44	MF	(Wales) WAL	Thomas Woodward	1	0	0+1	0	0+0	0	0+0	0
45	MF	(Wales) WAL	Cameron Congreve	1	0	0+0	0	0+0	0	0+1	0
46	DF	(England) ENG	Arthur Parker	1	0	0+0	0	0+0	0	0+1	0
Players who featured but departed the club permanently during the season:
16	DF	(England) ENG	Ishé Samuels-Smith	8	0	3+3	0	0+0	0	2+0	0
21	FW	(Angola) ANG	Manuel Benson	8	0	1+5	0	0+0	0	1+1	0
26	DF	(England) ENG	Kaelan Casey	13	0	3+5	0	1+0	0	4+0	0
