= Zeidane Inoussa =

Swedish footballer (born 2002)

Personal information
- Date of birth: 13 May 2002 (age 24)
- Place of birth: Hässelby-Vällingby, Sweden
- Height: 1.77 m (5 ft 10 in)
- Position: Winger

Team information
- Current team: Górnik Zabrze (on loan from Swansea City)
- Number: 27

Youth career
- 2016–2019: Brommapojkarna
- 2019–2020: Caen

Senior career*
Years	Team	Apps	(Gls)
2020–2022	Caen II	13	(2)
2020–2023	Caen	7	(0)
2022	→ Real Murcia (loan)	11	(4)
2022–2023	→ Real Murcia (loan)	16	(0)
2023	→ Valencia CF Mestalla (loan)	16	(2)
2023	Brommapojkarna	10	(5)
2024–2025	BK Häcken	23	(6)
2025–	Swansea City	25	(0)
2026–	→ Górnik Zabrze (loan)	4	(0)

International career
2018	Sweden U17	3	(0)
2021	Sweden U19	4	(0)
2024	Sweden U21	4	(0)
- * Club domestic league appearances and goals as of 25 October 2026

Zeidane Inoussa (born 13 May 2002) is a Swedish professional footballer who plays as a winger for Polish club Górnik Zabrze, on loan from EFL Championship club Swansea City.

== Club career ==
=== Early career ===
Inoussa made his professional debut with Caen in 3–0 Ligue 2 win over Rodez AF on 12 September 2020.

On 31 January 2022, Inoussa joined Real Murcia in Spain on loan. On 18 July 2022, he returned to Real Murcia on a new loan for the 2022–23 season. On 31 January 2023, Inoussa moved on a new loan to Valencia CF Mestalla.

=== Swansea City ===
On 5 May 2025, Swansea City announced the permanent signing of Inoussa from BK Häcken on a five-year contract, starting on 1 July 2025. He made his debut on 9 August 2025, coming on as a second-half substitute in a 0–1 loss against Middlesbrough. His first start would come in a 3–1 EFL Cup first round win against Crawley Town.

==== Loan to Górnik Zabrze ====
On 11 September 2026, Inoussa joined Ekstraklasa club Górnik Zabrze on a season-long loan.

== International career ==
Born in Sweden, Inoussa is of Beninese descent. He has been a youth international for Sweden.

== Career statistics ==
As of match played 11 January 2026

Club	Season	League			National cup (Note: Includes Coupe de France, Copa del Rey, Svenska Cupen, FA Cup)		League cup (Note: Includes EFL Cup)		Continental		Other		Total	
Club	Season	Division	Apps	Goals	Apps	Goals	Apps	Goals	Apps	Goals	Apps	Goals	Apps	Goals
Caen II	2019–20	National 3	1	1	—		—		—		—		1	1
Caen II	2020–21	National 2	6	1	—		—		—		—		6	1
Caen II	2021–22	National 2	6	0	—		—		—		—		6	0
Caen II	Total		13	2	—		—		—		—		13	2
Caen	2020–21	Ligue 2	3	0	1	0	—		—		—		4	0
Caen	2021–22	Ligue 2	4	0	0	0	—		—		—		4	0
Caen	Total		7	0	1	0	—						8	0
Real Murica (loan)	2021–22	Segunda RFEF	12	4	0	0	—		—		—		12	4
Real Murica (loan)	2022–23	Primera Federación	16	0	1	0	—		—		—		17	0
Real Murica (loan)	Total		28	4	1	0	—		—		—		29	4
Valencia CF Mestalla (loan)	2022–23	Segunda Federación	16	2	0	0	—		—		—		16	2
Brommapojkarna	2023	Allsvenskan	10	5	0	0	—		—		2 (Note: Appearances in Allsvenskan play-off)	0	12	5
BK Häcken	2024	Allsvenskan	22	6	7	2	—		6 (Note: Appearances in UEFA Conference League)	3	—		35	11
BK Häcken	2025	Allsvenskan	1	0	0	0	—		0	0	—		1	0
BK Häcken	Total		23	6	7	2	—		6	3	—		36	11
Swansea City	2025–26	Championship	24	0	1	1	3	0	—		—		28	1
Górnik Zabrze (loan)	2026–27	Ekstraklasa	0	0	0	0	—		—		—		0	0
Total			121	19	10	3	3	0	6	3	2	0	144	25
