= Bobby Wales =

Scottish footballer (born 2005)

Personal information
- Full name: Bobby James Wales
- Date of birth: 23 June 2005 (age 21)
- Place of birth: Hurlford, Scotland
- Position: Forward

Team information
- Current team: Dundee (on loan from Swansea City)
- Number: 9

Youth career
- Hurlford Boys Club
- –2022: Kilmarnock

Senior career*
Years	Team	Apps	(Gls)
2022–2025	Kilmarnock	38	(3)
2023–2024	→ Alloa Athletic (loan)	27	(12)
2025–	Swansea City	4	(0)
2026	→ Huddersfield Town (loan)	5	(0)
2026–	→ Dundee (loan)	5	(0)

International career^{‡}
2021–2022	Scotland U17	5	(0)
2022–2023	Scotland U18	4	(1)
2022–2024	Scotland U19	14	(2)
2024–	Scotland U21	3	(1)
- * Club domestic league appearances and goals as of 17:10, 19 September 2026 (UTC) ‡ National team caps and goals as of 10:24, 21 May 2025 (UTC)

Bobby James Wales (born 23 June 2005) is a Scottish professional footballer who plays as a forward for Scottish Premiership club Dundee, on loan from EFL Championship club Swansea City.

== Career ==
=== Kilmarnock ===
Wales grew up watching the side at Rugby Park. He played for local club Hurlford United's youth side Hurlford Boys' Club, where he was scouted by Kilmarnock's under-18s coach Craig Clark. Wales signed his first professional contract with Kilmarnock on 17 July 2021. He immediately started playing for the U18s, making his debut in a 2–1 win over Hearts U18s. He scored his first goal at that level in a 2–1 win over Hamilton Academical U18s.

Wales made his Scottish Challenge Cup debut for Kilmarnock B against Cowdenbeath, and was among the scorers as his side won 3–0. He made his Scottish Premiership debut on 29 October 2022, coming on as a 90th-minute substitute for Ash Taylor in a 1–0 loss to St. Johnstone. He had to wait for two months before he got his first start for Killie, replacing Innes Cameron, who injured himself before kick-off; Kilmarnock lost 3–1 to Heart of Midlothian. Wales made 10 appearances in the 2022–23 campaign, including two starts, but scored no goals. He did score 25 times, however, in the development squads, including two in the SPFL Reserve Cup final against Dunfermline Athletic. He was awarded the Rising Academy Star award at the end of the season.

Wales was loaned to Scottish League One club Alloa Athletic in September 2023.

=== Swansea City ===
On 18 May 2025, Wales agreed to sign for Championship club Swansea City, having agreed a compensation package with Kilmarnock. He signed a four-year deal with the club, officially joining when the transfer window opens on 1 June. He made his debut on 12 August 2025, scoring and providing an assist in a 3–1 EFL Cup first round victory over Crawley Town.

==== Dundee (loan) ====
After a loan the previous season to EFL League One club Huddersfield Town, on 20 August 2026 Wales returned to the Scottish Premiership the following season on a season-long loan with Dundee. He made his debut off the bench on 22 August in an away victory in the Dundee derby.

== International career ==
Bobby Wales was called up to the Scotland under-17 side in their bid to qualify for the UEFA Under-17 Championship in Israel. He made his debut on 30 October 2021, in a 3–2 victory against Albania U17. Scotland U17 qualified and Wales was called up once again for the tournament itself; He featured twice – a 3–1 loss to Denmark U17 and a 1–0 loss to Sweden U17. Scotland U17 were eliminated without winning a game.

Wales was then called up to the Scotland under-19 side as they attempted to reach the UEFA Under-19 Championship in Malta. He made his debut on 16 November 2022 in a 1–0 loss against Iceland U19. Scotland U19 qualified and Wales was called up once again for the tournament itself (he was also selected for two friendlies beforehand, and scored in a 2–2 draw with Wales U19). Wales played in Scotland U19's opening game of the tournament on 6 September 2023, a 3–0 loss to Belgium U19.

== Career statistics ==
As of match played 19 September 2026

Appearances and goals by club, season and competition
Club	Season	League			National cup (Note: Includes Scottish FA Cup, FA Cup)		League cup (Note: Includes Scottish League Cup, EFL Cup)		Other		Total	
Club	Season	Division	Apps	Goals	Apps	Goals	Apps	Goals	Apps	Goals	Apps	Goals
Kilmarnock	2022–23	Scottish Premiership	10	0	0	0	0	0	0	0	10	0
Kilmarnock	2023–24	Scottish Premiership	0	0	0	0	0	0	0	0	0	0
Kilmarnock	2024–25	Scottish Premiership	28	3	1	1	1	0	0	0	30	4
Kilmarnock	Total		38	3	1	1	1	0	0	0	40	4
Kilmarnock B	2022–23	—			—		—		2 (Note: Appearance(s) in the Scottish Challenge Cup)	2	2	2
Kilmarnock B	2023–24	—			—		—		1	1	1	1
Kilmarnock B	Total		—		—		—		3	3	3	3
Alloa Athletic (loan)	2023–24	Scottish League One	27	12	0	0	0	0	0	0	27	12
Swansea City	2025–26	Championship	4	0	1 (Note: Wales was an extra-time substitute in the 11 January 2026 FA Cup loss to West Bromwich Albion; this was not recorded by Soccerbase)	0	1	1	0	0	6	1
Swansea City	2026–27	Championship	0	0	0	0	0	0	0	0	0	0
Swansea City	Total		4	0	1	0	1	1	0	0	6	1
Huddersfield Town (loan)	2025–26	EFL League One	5	0	0	0	0	0	1 (Note: Appearance(s) in the EFL Trophy)	0	6	0
Dundee (loan)	2026–27	Scottish Premiership	5	0	0	0	—		0	0	5	0
Career total			79	15	2	1	2	1	4	3	87	20
