= Žan Vipotnik =

Slovenian footballer (born 2002)

Personal information
- Date of birth: 18 March 2002 (age 24)
- Place of birth: Celje, Slovenia
- Height: 1.85 m (6 ft 1 in)
- Position: Forward

Team information
- Current team: Swansea City
- Number: 9

Youth career
- 2008–2014: Dravinja
- 2014–2020: Maribor

Senior career*
Years	Team	Apps	(Gls)
2020–2023	Maribor	39	(20)
2021	→ Gorica (loan)	17	(1)
2022	→ Triglav Kranj (loan)	12	(9)
2023–2024	Bordeaux	37	(10)
2024–	Swansea City	102	(33)

International career^{‡}
2017	Slovenia U15	4	(2)
2017–2018	Slovenia U16	7	(1)
2018–2019	Slovenia U17	10	(1)
2019	Slovenia U18	2	(0)
2020	Slovenia U19	1	(0)
2022	Slovenia U21	3	(0)
2023–	Slovenia	32	(6)
- * Club domestic league appearances and goals as of 22 November 2026 ‡ National team caps and goals as of 16 November 2026

Žan Vipotnik (born 18 March 2002) is a Slovenian professional footballer who plays as a forward for EFL Championship club Swansea City and the Slovenia national team.

== Club career ==
=== Early career ===
Vipotnik began his career at his hometown club Dravinja, and later joined the academy of Slovenian giants Maribor. He scored 58 goals for the under-15 team in the 2016–17 season, and was equally successful in the later stages of his youth career, scoring 53 goals in 50 games for the under-17 team and 31 goals in 25 games for the under-19 team.

He made his senior debut for Maribor on 8 July 2021, after being named in the starting eleven in the UEFA Europa Conference League match against Urartu. He spent most of 2021 and 2022 on loan, first with top division club Gorica, and later with Triglav Kranj in the second division.

Vipotnik made a breakthrough in the 2022–23 season. He started the season in Maribor mostly as a substitute, but slowly made his way into the starting eleven and scored his first league goal in the 11th round against Gorica. Despite this, he finished the season as the league's top scorer with 20 goals.

=== Bordeaux ===
In July 2023, Vipotnik transferred to Ligue 2 side Bordeaux for a reported transfer fee of about €3 million. He scored ten goals for the side, but off-the-field issues saw the club enter administration at the end of the 2023–24 season and give up their professional status, releasing Vipotnik as a free agent.

=== Swansea City ===
On 1 August 2024, Vipotnik joined Championship side Swansea City on a four-year deal. On 17 August, he scored his first goal for the club after coming off the bench in a 3–0 victory over Preston. In his first season, he netted 7 goals in 42 league appearances.

He began his second season with the Swans much more prolifically, surpassing his previous season's total in all competitions by October after scoring a brace against Norwich City. After scoring another brace against Blackburn Rovers on 20 January, he became the league's outright top scorer. Amid good performances, having scored 17 league goals by the end of March, and despite interest from Premier League teams, Vipotnik signed a new contract with Swansea, tying him to the club until the summer of 2030. He ultimately finished the season with 23 league goals and won the league's top scorer award, and was also named in the Championship's Team of the Season.

== International career ==
Between 2017 and 2022, Vipotnik represented Slovenia in all youth levels from under-15 to under-21 and made more than 25 appearances for all teams combined. In March 2023, he was called up to the Slovenian senior team by manager Matjaž Kek for the UEFA Euro 2024 qualifying matches against Kazakhstan and San Marino. Vipotnik made his full international debut on 23 March in an away game against Kazakhstan, where he entered the game in the 70th minute and scored the winning goal for Slovenia eight minutes later in a 2–1 win. By doing so, he became the second youngest player to score for Slovenia, behind only Benjamin Šeško, at the age of 21 years and 5 days.

Vipotnik was included in Slovenia's 26-man squad for UEFA Euro 2024. He made one appearance at the final tournament, playing the last fifteen minutes in the group stage draw against Serbia.

== Career statistics ==
=== Club ===
As of match played 21 November 2026

Appearances and goals by club, season and competition
Club	Season	League			National cup (Note: Includes Slovenian Cup, Coupe de France, FA Cup)		League cup (Note: Includes EFL Cup)		Continental		Other		Total	
Club	Season	Division	Apps	Goals	Apps	Goals	Apps	Goals	Apps	Goals	Apps	Goals	Apps	Goals
Maribor	2020–21	Slovenian PrvaLiga	0	0	0	0	—		—		—		0	0
Maribor	2021–22	Slovenian PrvaLiga	9	0	0	0	—		3 (Note: Appearances in UEFA Europa Conference League)	0	—		12	0
Maribor	2022–23	Slovenian PrvaLiga	30	20	4	3	—		4 (Note: One appearance in UEFA Champions League, two appearances in UEFA Europa League, one appearance in UEFA Europa Conference League)	0	—		38	23
Maribor	Total		39	20	4	3	—		7	0	—		50	23
Gorica (loan)	2020–21	Slovenian PrvaLiga	17	1	0	0	—		—		—		17	1
Triglav Kranj (loan)	2021–22	Slovenian Second League	12	9	0	0	—		—		2 (Note: Appearances in PrvaLiga play-off)	1	14	10
Bordeaux	2023–24	Ligue 2	37	10	3	0	—		—		—		40	10
Swansea City	2024–25	Championship	42	7	0	0	2	0	—		—		44	7
Swansea City	2025–26	Championship	44	23	1	0	4	2	—		—		49	25
Swansea City	2026–27	Championship	16	3	0	0	1	0	—		—		17	3
Swansea City	Total		102	33	1	0	7	2	—		—		110	35
Career total			207	73	8	3	7	2	7	0	2	1	231	79

=== International ===
As of match played 16 November 2026

Appearances and goals by national team and year
National team	Year	Apps	Goals
Slovenia	2023	8	2
Slovenia	2024	7	0
Slovenia	2025	7	1
Slovenia	2026	10	3
Total		32	6

Scores and results list Slovenia's goal tally first, score column indicates score after each Vipotnik goal.

List of international goals scored by Žan Vipotnik
No.	Date	Venue	Opponent	Score	Result	Competition
1	23 March 2023	Astana Arena, Astana, Kazakhstan	Kazakhstan	2–1	2–1	UEFA Euro 2024 qualifying
2	10 September 2023	San Marino Stadium, Serravalle, San Marino	San Marino	1–0	4–0	UEFA Euro 2024 qualifying
3	5 September 2025	Stožice Stadium, Ljubljana, Slovenia	Sweden	2–2	2–2	2026 FIFA World Cup qualification
4	31 March 2026	Podgorica City Stadium, Podgorica, Montenegro	Montenegro	1–1	3–2	Friendly
5	31 March 2026	Podgorica City Stadium, Podgorica, Montenegro	Montenegro	3–2	3–2	Friendly
6	3 October 2026	Thermoplan Arena, Lucerne, Switzerland	Switzerland	1–0	1–2	2026–27 UEFA Nations League B

== Honours ==
Individual

- Slovenian PrvaLiga Player of the Year: 2022–23
- Slovenian PrvaLiga top goalscorer: 2022–23
- Slovenian PrvaLiga Team of the Year: 2022–23
- EFL Championship top goalscorer: 2025–26
- EFL Championship Team of the Season: 2025–26
- Swansea City Player of the Year: 2025–26
- PFA Team of the Year: 2025–26 Championship
