= Odin Samuels-Smith =

Jamaican footballer

Personal information
- Full name: Odin Darren Samuels-Smith
- Date of birth: 5 June 2006 (age 20)
- Place of birth: Manchester, England
- Height: 1.83 m (6 ft 0 in)
- Position: Centre-back

Team information
- Current team: Everton

Youth career
- 2015–2025: Everton

Senior career*
Years	Team	Apps	(Gls)
2025–	Everton	0	(0)
2025–2026	→ Marine (loan)	12	(0)

International career^{‡}
2026–	Jamaica	1	(0)
- * Club domestic league appearances and goals as of 22:36, 31 May 2026 (UTC) ‡ National team caps and goals as of 22:36, 31 May 2026 (UTC)

Odin Darren Samuels-Smith (born 5 June 2006) is a professional footballer who plays as a centre-back for Premier League side Everton. Born in England, he plays for the Jamaica national team.

== Club career ==
Samuels-Smith joined Everton's academy at Under-12 level, progressing through the youth ranks at Goodison Park. A versatile defender, he is capable of operating at right-back, centre-back and left-back. During the 2023–24 season he made 23 appearances for Everton Under-18s, as well as earning two appearances in Premier League 2 for the Under-21s. On 17 August 2024, Samuels-Smith signed his first professional contract with Everton, penning a two-year deal until June 2026.

In October 2025, Samuels-Smith joined Marine of the National League North on loan, making his debut against Worksop Town. He made 15 appearances for the club before returning to Everton in January 2026 to rejoin the Under-21 setup.

== International career ==
Born in England, Samuels-Smith is of Jamaican descent and holds dual-citizenship. He was called up to the Jamaica national team for the 2026 Unity Cup.

== Personal life ==
Samuels-Smith is the twin brother of Ishé Samuels-Smith, a defender who left Everton's academy in 2023 to join Chelsea.
