= Ishé Samuels-Smith =

English footballer (born 2006)

Personal information
- Full name: Ishé Barrington Samuels-Smith
- Date of birth: 5 June 2006 (age 20)
- Place of birth: Manchester, England
- Height: 1.82 m (6 ft 0 in)
- Positions: Left-back; left wing-back

Team information
- Current team: Notts County (on loan from Chelsea)
- Number: 26

Youth career
- 2015–2023: Everton
- 2023–2025: Chelsea

Senior career*
Years	Team	Apps	(Gls)
2025	Strasbourg	0	(0)
2025–	Chelsea	0	(0)
2025–2026	→ Swansea City (loan)	6	(0)
2026–	→ Notts County (loan)	8	(0)

International career^{‡}
- England U15
2021–2022	England U16	6	(0)
2022–2023	England U17	21	(1)
2023–2024	England U18	7	(0)
2024–	England U19	1	(0)
2025–	England U20	1	(0)
- * Club domestic league appearances and goals as of 19:58, 1 November 2026 (UTC) ‡ National team caps and goals as of 13:42, 9 October 2025 (UTC)

Ishé Barrington Samuels-Smith (born 5 June 2006) is an English footballer who plays as a left-back or left wing-back for EFL League One club Notts County, on loan from Premier League club Chelsea.

== Club career ==
Born in Manchester, Samuels-Smith joined the academy of Everton at the age of nine. He progressed through the academy, and in September 2022 was named by English newspaper The Guardian as the best player of his age group at Everton. On 8 November of the same year, then-manager Frank Lampard named Samuels-Smith on the bench as Everton faced AFC Bournemouth in the third round of the EFL Cup. Following Lampard's sacking in January 2023, new manager Sean Dyche called Samuels-Smith up to the bench again in April of the same year, though he again failed to feature as Everton lost 3–1 to Fulham.

Having initially been linked with Samuels-Smith in July 2022, fellow Premier League club Chelsea were reported to have agreed a three-year deal with Samuels-Smith in July 2023, with a £4 million bid made. This deal was later officially confirmed on 8 July.

On 30 July 2025, Samuels-Smith joined Ligue 1 club Strasbourg on a permanent transfer. On 2 September, his transfer to Strasbourg was reversed and he returned to Chelsea, before joining Championship club Swansea City on a season-long loan.

On 11 August 2026, he joined League One club Notts County on a season-long loan.

== International career ==
Samuels-Smith has represented England from under-15 to under-18 level. He was a member of the squad that finished fifth at the 2023 UEFA European Under-17 Championship and his performances during the competition led to his inclusion in the team of the tournament.

On 6 September 2023, Samuels-Smith made his England U-18 debut during a 2–0 defeat to France in Limoges.

On 2 November 2023, Samuels-Smith was included in the England squad for the 2023 FIFA U-17 World Cup.

On 4 September 2024, Samuels-Smith made his England U19 debut during a 2–2 draw with Italy in Nedelišće.

On 5 September 2025, Samuels-Smith made his U20 debut during a 2-1 defeat to Italy at the SMH Group Stadium.

== Personal life ==
Samuels-Smith has a twin brother, Odin, who plays for Everton.

== Career statistics ==
As of match played 21 March 2026

Appearances and goals by club, season and competition
Club	Season	League			National cup (Note: Includes Coupe de France, FA Cup)		League cup (Note: Includes EFL Cup)		Other		Total	
Club	Season	Division	Apps	Goals	Apps	Goals	Apps	Goals	Apps	Goals	Apps	Goals
Everton U21	2022–23	—							4 (Note: Appearances in EFL Trophy)	0	4	0
Chelsea U21	2023–24	—			—		—		0	0	0	0
Chelsea U21	2024–25	—			—		—		3	0	3	0
Chelsea U21	Total		0	0	0	0	0	0	7	0	7	0
Strasbourg	2025–26	Ligue 1	0	0	0	0	—		0	0	0	0
Chelsea	2025–26	Premier League	0	0	0	0	0	0	0	0	0	0
Swansea City (loan)	2025–26	EFL Championship	6	0	0	0	2	0	—		8	0
Career total			6	0	0	0	2	0	7	0	15	0

== Honours ==
England U18s

- 2024 U18 Pinatar Super Cup

Individual

- UEFA European Under-17 Championship Team of the Tournament: 2023
