= 2024–25 Kilmarnock F.C. season =

Kilmarnock Football Club season

Kilmarnock
2024–25 season
- Chairman: Billy Bowie
- Manager: Derek McInnes (until 15 May); Chris Burke (interim)
- Stadium: Rugby Park
- Premiership: 9th
- Scottish Cup: Fourth round
- League Cup: Second round
- Europa League: Second qualifying round
- Conference League: Play-off round
- Top goalscorer: League: Bruce Anderson (11); All: Bruce Anderson (11)
- Highest home attendance: 10,410 vs. Cercle Brugge, Europa League, 25 July 2024
- Lowest home attendance: 4,601 vs. Motherwell, Premiership, 8 January 2025
- Average home league attendance: 6,358
Home colours	Away colours	Third colours

The 2024–25 season was the 146th season of competitive association football and the 12th season in the Scottish Professional Football League played by Kilmarnock Football Club, a professional football club based in Kilmarnock, Ayrshire, Scotland. The club competed in the top tier of Scottish football for the third consecutive season.

== Results and fixtures ==
=== Pre-season friendlies ===
Kilmarnock's score is shown first in each case.

Kilmarnock preseason results
Date	Venue	Opponents	Score	Kilmarnock scorers	Att.	Ref.
29 June 2024	Marbella Football Centre, San Pedro Alcántara (N)	Cerro Porteño	0–2		0	
3 July 2024	Rugby Park, Kilmarnock (H)	The New Saints	5–0	Anderson (3), Cameron, Lyons	0	
11 July 2024	Somerset Park, Ayr (A)	Ayr United	2–3	Lyons 43', Deas 72'		
14 July 2024	Beechwood Park, Auchinleck (A)	Auchinleck Talbot	4–0	Brown, Lyons, Anderson, Wales	0	
19 July 2024	Rugby Park, Kilmarnock (H)	Barrow	5–0	Wright 25', Armstrong 47' (pen.), 65' (pen.), Watkins 49', Murray 66'		

=== Scottish Premiership ===
Kilmarnock's score is shown first in each case.

Kilmarnock in the 2024–25 Scottish Premiership
Date	Venue	Opponents	Score	Kilmarnock scorers	Att.	Ref.
4 August 2024	Celtic Park, Glasgow (A)	Celtic	0–4		58,712	
11 August 2024	Rugby Park, Kilmarnock (H)	St Johnstone	0–3		4,843	
24 August 2024	Pittodrie Stadium, Aberdeen (A)	Aberdeen	0–2		16,146	
1 September 2024	Rugby Park, Kilmarnock (H)	Hibernian	1–1	Anderson 90+2' (pen.)	7,763	
14 September 2024	St Mirren Park, Paisley (A)	St Mirren	2–2	Watkins 11', Ayunga 71' (o.g.)	6,957	
28 September 2024	Rugby Park, Kilmarnock (H)	Dundee United	3–3	Watson 47', 58', Watkins 64'	6,257	
5 October 2024	Dens Park, Dundee (A)	Dundee	3–2	Kennedy 86', 90+4', Anderson 88'	5,316	
20 October 2024	Rugby Park, Kilmarnock (H)	Rangers	1–0	Watkins 87'	8,924	
26 October 2024	Victoria Park, Dingwall (A)	Ross County	1–2	Ndaba 39'	3,419	
30 October 2024	Tynecastle Park, Edinburgh (A)	Heart of Midlothian	2–1	Kennedy 58', Vassell 63'	18,402	
3 November 2024	Dens Park, Dundee (A)	Dundee	2–3	Anderson 24', Kennedy 40'	5,014	
10 November 2024	Rugby Park, Kilmarnock (H)	Celtic	0–2		8,657	
23 November 2024	McDiarmid Park, Perth (A)	St Johnstone	0–1		1,872	
30 November 2024	Rugby Park, Kilmarnock (H)	Dundee	1–1	Wales 80'	5,454	
4 December 2024	Ibrox Stadium, Glasgow (A)	Rangers	0–6		44,188	
7 December 2024	Tannadice Park, Dundee (A)	Dundee United	1–1	Anderson 90+5' (pen.)	8,402	
15 December 2024	Rugby Park, Kilmarnock (H)	Heart of Midlothian	1–0	Anderson 18' (pen.)	5,474	
20 December 2024	Fir Park, Motherwell (A)	Motherwell	1–1	Polworth 74'	4,966	
26 December 2024	Rugby Park, Kilmarnock (H)	Aberdeen	4–0	Vassell 18', Watson 59', Cameron 87', Anderson 90+3'	6,846	
29 December 2024	Easter Road, Edinburgh (A)	Hibernian	0–1		19,265	
2 January 2025	Rugby Park, Kilmarnock (H)	St Mirren	2–0	Anderson 8', 65' (pen.)	6,603	
5 January 2025	Rugby Park, Kilmarnock (H)	Ross County	0–1		5,426	
8 January 2025	Rugby Park, Kilmarnock (H)	Motherwell	0–0		4,601	
25 January 2025	Tynecastle Park, Edinburgh (A)	Heart of Midlothian	2–3	Wales 50', Murray 67'	18,677	
1 February 2025	Rugby Park, Kilmarnock (H)	Dundee United	1–0	Watkins 72'	5,661	
15 February 2025	Rugby Park, Kilmarnock (H)	St Johnstone	3–1	Polworth 9', Murray 56', Wales 60'	5,479	
22 February 2025	Pittodrie Stadium, Aberdeen (A)	Aberdeen	0–1		16,993	
26 February 2025	Rugby Park, Kilmarnock (H)	Rangers	2–4	Wright 11', Lyons 14'	8,751	
1 March 2025	Victoria Park, Dingwall (A)	Ross County	0–1		3,385	
15 March 2025	Rugby Park, Kilmarnock (H)	Hibernian	1–1	Murray 90+2'	6,703	
29 March 2025	St Mirren Park, Paisley (A)	St Mirren	1–5	Anderson 88' (pen.)	7,542	
5 April 2025	Rugby Park, Kilmarnock (H)	Motherwell	2–0	Murray 22', Wright 53'	5,671	
12 April 2025	Celtic Park, Glasgow (A)	Celtic	1–5	Armstrong 29'	58,712	
26 April 2025	Rugby Park, Kilmarnock (H)	Ross County	2–0	Anderson 36', Donnelly 69'	5,425	
3 May 2025	McDiarmid Park, Perth (A)	St Johnstone	2–0	Watson 12', Armstrong 53' (pen.)	5,191	
10 May 2025	Rugby Park, Kilmarnock (H)	Dundee	3–2	Armstrong 31' (pen.), Anderson 77', Deas 90+1'	5,669	
14 May 2025	Fir Park, Motherwell (A)	Motherwell	0–3		4,941	
18 May 2025	Rugby Park, Kilmarnock (H)	Heart of Midlothian	0–1		6,601	

=== Scottish Cup ===
Kilmarnock's score is shown first in each case.

Kilmarnock in the 2024–25 Scottish Cup
Date	Round	Venue	Opponents	Score	Kilmarnock scorers	Att.	Ref.
18 January 2025	Fourth round	Celtic Park, Glasgow (A)	Celtic	1–2	Wales 45+1’	40,916	

=== Scottish League Cup ===
Kilmarnock's score is shown first in each case.

Kilmarnock in the 2024–25 League Cup
Date	Round	Venue	Opponents	Score	Kilmarnock scorers	Att.	Ref.
18 August 2024	Second round	Fir Park, Motherwell (A)	Motherwell	0–1 (a.e.t.)		4,371	

=== UEFA Europa League ===
Kilmarnock's score is shown first in each case.

Kilmarnock in the 2024–25 Europa League
Date	Round	Venue	Opponents	Score	Kilmarnock scorers	Att.	Ref.
25 July 2024	Second qualifying round first leg	Rugby Park, Kilmarnock (H)	(Belgium) Cercle Brugge	1–1	Watson 70'	10,410	
1 August 2024	Second qualifying round second leg	Jan Breydel Stadium, Bruges (A)	(Belgium) Cercle Brugge	0–1		10,230	

=== UEFA Conference League ===
Kilmarnock's score is shown first in each case.

Kilmarnock in the 2024–25 Conference League
Date	Round	Venue	Opponents	Score	Kilmarnock scorers	Att.	Ref.
8 August 2024	Third qualifying round first leg	Rugby Park, Kilmarnock (H)	(Norway) Tromsø	2–2	Vassell 6', Wales 90+2'	6,995	
15 August 2024	Third qualifying round second leg	Romssa Arena, Tromsø (A)	(Norway) Tromsø	1–0	Skjærvik 11' (o.g.)	5,891	
22 August 2024	Play-off round first leg	Parken, Copenhagen (A)	(Denmark) Copenhagen	0–2		17,056	
29 August 2024	Play-off round second leg	Rugby Park, Kilmarnock (H)	(Denmark) Copenhagen	1–1	Watkins 16'	8,083	

== Squad statistics ==
No.	Pos.	Name	Premiership		Scottish Cup		League Cup		Europe		Total		Discipline	
No.	Pos.	Name	Apps	Goals	Apps	Goals	Apps	Goals	Apps	Goals	Apps	Goals	Yellow card	Red card
1	GK	(Republic of Ireland) Kieran O'Hara	19	0	1	0	1	0	2	0	23	0	2	0
2	DF	(Scotland) Jack Burroughs	12	0	0	0	0	0	2	0	14	0	0	0
3	DF	(Republic of Ireland) Corrie Ndaba	36	1	1	0	0	0	1	0	38	1	5	0
4	DF	(Wales) Joe Wright	28	2	1	0	1	0	6	0	36	2	8	2
5	DF	(Scotland) Lewis Mayo	37	0	1	0	1	0	6	0	45	0	2	0
6	DF	(Scotland) Robbie Deas	32	1	1	0	1	0	4	0	38	1	6	1
7	MF	(Scotland) Rory McKenzie	19	0	1	0	1	0	3	0	24	0	0	0
8	MF	(Northern Ireland) Brad Lyons	30	1	1	0	1	0	6	0	38	1	5	1
9	FW	(Northern Ireland) Kyle Vassell	25	2	0	0	1	0	6	1	32	4	2	0
10	MF	(Northern Ireland) Matty Kennedy	19	4	0	0	1	0	6	0	26	4	3	0
11	MF	(Scotland) Daniel Armstrong	33	3	1	0	0	0	6	0	40	3	8	1
12	MF	(Scotland) David Watson	35	4	1	0	1	0	5	1	42	5	3	0
14	MF	(Scotland) Gary Mackay-Steven	10	0	0	0	1	0	2	0	13	0	0	0
15	MF	(Scotland) Fraser Murray	33	4	1	0	1	0	4	0	39	4	3	0
16	MF	(Scotland) Kyle Magennis	12	0	0	0	0	0	0	0	12	0	2	0
17	DF	(Scotland) Stuart Findlay	17	0	0	0	1	0	6	0	24	0	3	1
18	FW	(Scotland) Innes Cameron	21	1	0	0	0	0	1	0	22	1	0	0
19	FW	(Scotland) Bruce Anderson	28	11	1	0	1	0	3	0	33	11	1	0
20	GK	(Scotland) Robby McCrorie	19	0	1	0	0	0	4	0	24	0	1	0
21	DF	(Scotland) Calvin Ramsay	8	0	0	0	0	0	0	0	8	0	0	0
22	MF	(Northern Ireland) Liam Donnelly	25	1	1	0	1	0	6	0	33	1	8	2
23	FW	(Wales) Marley Watkins	30	4	1	0	1	0	3	1	35	5	3	0
24	FW	(Scotland) Bobby Wales	28	3	1	1	1	0	4	1	34	5	2	0
31	MF	(Scotland) Liam Polworth	26	2	1	0	1	0	4	0	32	2	3	0
37	MF	(Scotland) Cole Burke	2	0	0	0	0	0	0	0	2	0	1	0
51	DF	(England) Oliver Bainbridge	6	0	0	0	1	0	2	0	9	0	1	0

== Club statistics ==
=== Competition overview ===
Competition	First match	Last match	Record							
Competition	First match	Last match	Pld	W	D	L	GF	GA	GD	Win %
Scottish Premiership	4 August 2024	18 May 2025	38	12	8	18	45	64	−19	31.58
Scottish Cup	18 January 2025	18 January 2025	1	0	0	1	1	2	−1	0.00
Scottish League Cup	18 August 2024	18 August 2024	1	0	0	1	0	1	−1	0.00
UEFA Europa League	25 July 2024	1 August 2024	2	0	1	1	1	2	−1	0.00
UEFA Conference League	8 August 2024	29 August 2024	4	1	2	1	4	5	−1	25.00
Total			46	13	11	22	51	74	−23	28.26

Source: Competitions

=== League table ===
Pos	Team	Pld	W	D	L	GF	GA	GD	Pts	Qualification or relegation (Note: Teams play each other three times (33 matches), before the league is split into two groups (the top six and the bottom six).)
7	Heart of Midlothian	38	15	7	16	52	47	+5	52	
8	Motherwell	38	14	7	17	46	63	−17	49	
9	Kilmarnock	38	12	8	18	45	64	−19	44	
10	Dundee	38	11	8	19	57	77	−20	41	
11	Ross County (R)	38	9	10	19	37	65	−28	37	Qualification for the Premiership play-off final

Rules for classification: 1) Points; 2) Goal difference; 3) Goals scored; 4) Head-to-head points; 5) Head-to-head goal difference; 6) Play-off (only if deciding champion, UEFA competitions qualification, second stage group allocation or relegation).
(R) Relegated

== Transfers ==
=== Transfers in ===
Date	Position	Name	Previous club	Fee	Ref.
29 May 2024	FW	Bruce Anderson	Livingston	Free	
10 July 2024	GK	Robby McCrorie	Rangers	Undisclosed	
30 July 2024	DF	(Republic of Ireland) Corrie Ndaba	(England) Ipswich Town	Undisclosed	

=== Transfers out ===
Date	Position	Name	Subsequent Club	Fee	Ref
22 May 2024	MF	Kerr McInroy	(Republic of Ireland) Shelbourne	Free	
22 May 2024	MF	Aaron Quigg	Annan Athletic	Free	
22 May 2024	MF	Steven Warnock		Free	
22 May 2024	DF	(England) Jack Sanders	St Johnstone	Free	
19 July 2024	FW	Greg Stewart	(India) Mohun Bagan SG	Free	
14 January 2025	DF	Lewis Mackle	Hurlford United	Free	

=== Loans in ===
Date	Position	Name	From	End date	Ref.
4 June 2024	DF	Stuart Findlay	(England) Oxford United	31 May 2025	
2 August 2024	DF	(England) Oliver Bainbridge	(England) Sunderland	1 January 2025	
20 August 2024	DF	Jack Burroughs	(England) Coventry City	1 January 2025	
13 January 2025	DF	Calvin Ramsay	(England) Liverpool	31 May 2025	
3 February 2025	DF	(England) Tom Wilson-Brown	(England) Leicester City	31 May 2025	

=== Loans out ===
Date	Position	Name	To	End date	Ref.
10 July 2024	FW	Zander Craik	Queen of the South	1 January 2025	
21 July 2024	GK	Corey Armour	Auchinleck Talbot	31 May 2025	
12 August 2024	DF	Andrew Miller	Auchinleck Talbot	31 May 2025	
13 August 2024	DF	Lewis Mackle	Hurlford United	1 January 2025	
24 August 2024	GK	Dylan Brown	Kilwinning Rangers	31 May 2025	
11 September 2024	DF	(Canada) Ethan Brown	Dumbarton	1 January 2025	
13 September 2024	GK	Aidan Glavin	Elgin City	31 May 2025	
13 September 2024	FW	Kian Leslie	Elgin City	31 May 2025	
25 October 2024	DF	Ruari Ellis	Broxburn Athletic	31 May 2025	
24 January 2025	DF	Euan Bowie	Kilwinning Rangers	31 May 2025	
31 January 2025	FW	Aaron Brown	Annan Athletic	31 May 2025	
6 February 2025	FW	Zander Craik	East Kilbride	31 May 2025	
20 February 2025	DF	Ben Brannan	Inverness CT	31 May 2025	
