= Florian Bianchini =

French footballer (born 2001)

Personal information
- Date of birth: 25 June 2001 (age 25)
- Place of birth: Reims, France
- Height: 1.77 m (5 ft 10 in)
- Position: Forward

Team information
- Current team: Clermont (on loan from Swansea City)
- Number: 7

Youth career
- 2007–2008: Montreuilloise
- 2008–2014: Réveil Nogentais
- 2014–2016: Château-Thierry
- 2016–2018: Amiens

Senior career*
Years	Team	Apps	(Gls)
2018–2020	Amiens II	13	(6)
2020–2023	Amiens	19	(0)
2021–2022	→ Avranches (loan)	31	(3)
2021–2022	→ Avranches II (loan)	1	(0)
2022–2023	→ Châteauroux (loan)	17	(2)
2023–2024	Bastia	29	(5)
2023	Bastia II	1	(0)
2024–	Swansea City	36	(3)
2025–2026	→ Portsmouth (loan)	10	(0)
2026–	→ Clermont (loan)	4	(1)

International career
2019	France U19	3	(1)
- * Club domestic league appearances and goals as of 4 September 2026

Florian Bianchini (born 25 June 2001) is a French professional footballer who plays as a forward for Ligue 2 club Clermont on loan from EFL Championship club Swansea City.

== Club career ==
=== France ===
Bianchini made his professional debut with Amiens in a 0–0 Ligue 2 tie with Châteauroux on 19 September 2020.

On 1 September 2022, Bianchini was loaned by Châteauroux.

He played for Bastia during the 2023–24 season, where he scored five goals for the club.

=== Swansea City and loans to Portsmouth and Clermont Foot 63 ===
On 23 August 2024, Bianchini signed for EFL Championship club Swansea City on a four year deal. He initially struggled for gametime, making just four substitute appearances in the league by 18 October 2024. Being described by head coach Luke Williams as someone who he was sure was "going to become a very good player for [Swansea]", he would begin to receive more gametime following a six-week knee injury to Eom Ji-sung. Bianchini scored his first goal for the club on 2 November 2024, in a 1-2 win against Oxford United. During his debut campaign, he would go onto score two more goals and make a total of 36 league appearances, though just eight of them were starts.

On 31 July 2025, Bianchini signed for fellow Championship club Portsmouth on a season-long loan. He made just ten league appearances during the season, six of which were starts, and would play his final game for the club on 26 November 2025, in a 3-0 loss away to Sheffield United. This was partly because of persistent issues with tendonitis in his knee, resulting in him being de-registered from Portsmouth's 25-man league squad on 11 February 2026. Furthermore, Portsmouth did not have an option to terminate Bianchini's loan spell, and Swansea City were unwilling to recall the forward.

Upon his return to Swansea City, he was left out of a pre-season training camp squad that traveled to Austria, and did not receive a squad number, putting his future at the club in doubt. On 1 September 2026, Bianchini joined Ligue 2 club Clermont Foot 63 on a season-long loan deal.

== Personal life ==
Bianchini is of Corsican descent through his grandfather.

== Career statistics ==
As of match played 26 November 2025

Appearances and goals by club, season and competition
Club	Season	League			National cup (Note: Includes Coupe de France, FA Cup)		League cup (Note: Includes EFL Cup)		Other		Total	
Club	Season	Division	Apps	Goals	Apps	Goals	Apps	Goals	Apps	Goals	Apps	Goals
Amiens II	2018–19	Championnat National 3	2	0	—		—		—		2	0
Amiens II	2019–20	Championnat National 3	8	1	—		—		—		8	1
Amiens II	2020–21	Championnat National 3	3	5	—		—		—		3	5
Amiens II	Total		13	6	—		—		—		13	6
Amiens	2020–21	Ligue 2	16	0	2	0	—		—		18	0
Amiens	2021–22	Ligue 2	0	0	0	0	—		—		0	0
Amiens	2022–23	Ligue 2	3	0	0	0	—		—		3	0
Amiens	Total		19	0	2	0	—		—		21	0
Avranches (loan)	2021–22	Championnat National	31	3	0	0	—		—		31	3
Avranches II (loan)	2021–22	Championnat National 3	1	0	—		—		—		1	0
Châteauroux (loan)	2022–23	Championnat National	17	2	3	1	—		—		20	3
Bastia II	2023–24	Championnat National 3	1	0	—		—		—		1	0
Bastia	2023–24	Ligue 2	28	5	1	0	—		—		29	5
Bastia	2024–25	Ligue 2	1	0	0	0	—		—		1	0
Bastia	Total		29	5	1	0	—		—		30	5
Swansea City	2024–25	EFL Championship	36	3	1	0	1	0	—		36	3
Portsmouth (loan)	2025–26	EFL Championship	10	0	0	0	1	0	—		11	0
Clermont Foot 63 (loan)	2026–27	Ligue 2	0	0	0	0	—		—		0	0
Career total			164	20	7	1	3	0	0	0	174	21
