= Melker Widell =

Swedish footballer (born 2002)

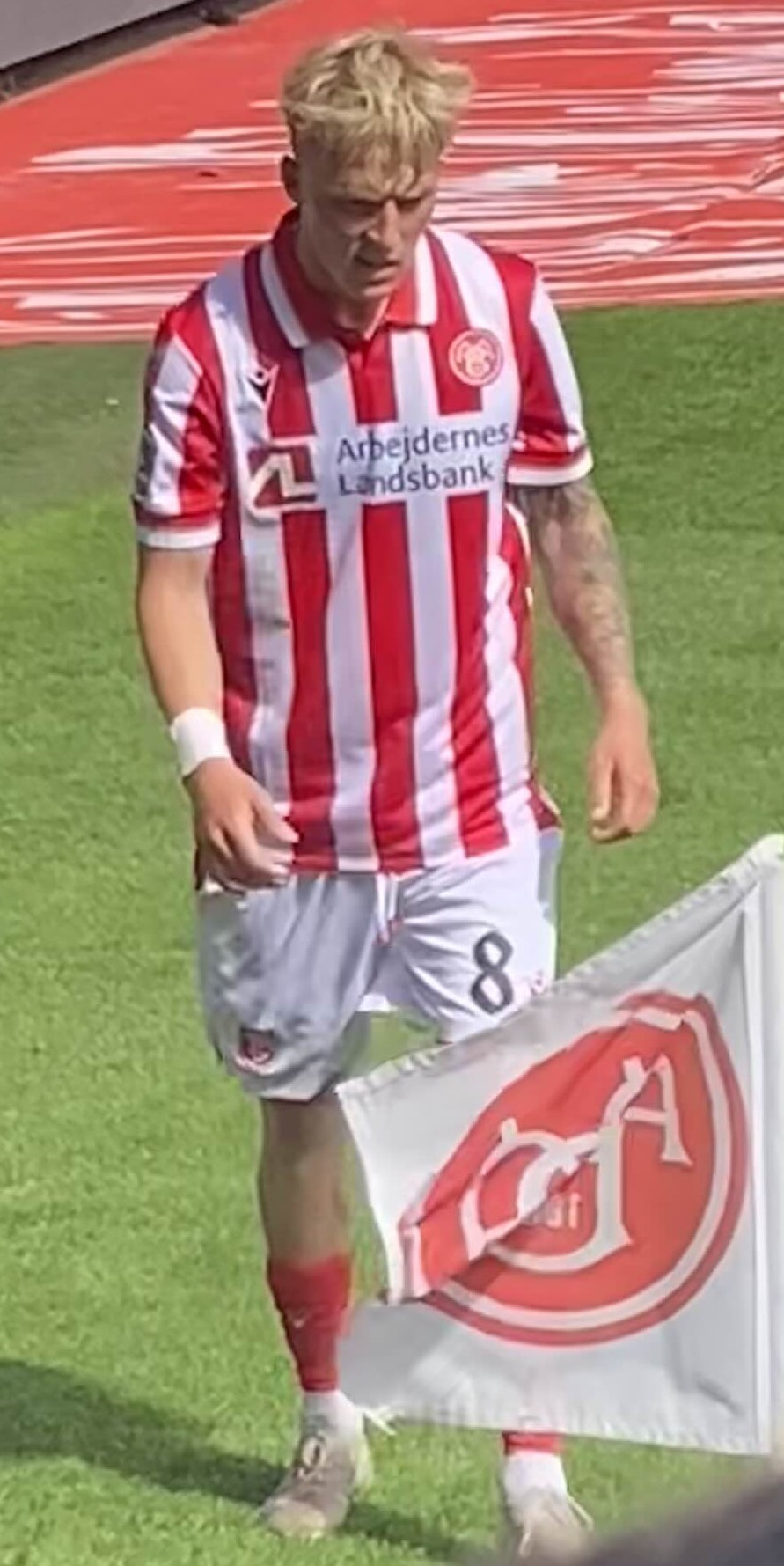
- Widell playing for AaB in 2025

Personal information
- Full name: Viktor Melker Widell
- Date of birth: 19 April 2002 (age 24)
- Place of birth: Billeberga, Sweden
- Height: 1.81 m (5 ft 11 in)
- Position: Midfielder

Team information
- Current team: Swansea City
- Number: 7

Youth career
- –2015: IK Wormo
- 2015–2016: LB07
- 2016–2021: Malmö FF

Senior career*
Years	Team	Apps	(Gls)
2022	Malmö FF	0	(0)
2022	→ BK Olympic (loan)	27	(3)
2023	Landskrona BoIS	14	(1)
2023–2025	AaB	44	(7)
2025–	Swansea City	51	(0)
2025	→ AaB (loan)	11	(2)

International career^{‡}
2018	Sweden U17	3	(0)
2023–2024	Sweden U21	9	(1)
2025–	Sweden	1	(0)
- * Club domestic league appearances and goals as of 31 October 2026 ‡ National team caps and goals as of 22:21, 25 March 2025 (UTC)

Viktor Melker Widell (born 19 April 2002) is a Swedish professional footballer who plays either in central midfield or as a winger for EFL Championship club Swansea City.

== Early life ==
Widell was born 19 April 2002. His father, Mikael, was a footballer, and played as a goalkeeper in the minor leagues of Swedish football. His younger brother, Casper Widell, currently plays for the Dutch team Excelsior in the Eredivisie.

Widell played youth football in Malmö FF.

== Club career ==
On 18 July 2023, Widell joined Danish club AaB on a 3-year deal.

On 31 January 2025, Widell joined EFL Championship club Swansea City on a four-year deal for an undisclosed fee, and was loaned back to AaB for the remainder of the 2024–25 season.

== International career ==
On 16 November 2023, Widell made his debut for the Sweden U21 during a 3–0 victory over Finland U21s, where he played the whole match on the central midfield. He made his full international debut for the Sweden national team on 25 March 2025, replacing Benjamin Nygren in the 86th minute of a friendly 5–1 win against the Northern Ireland.

== Career statistics ==
=== Club ===
As of match played 24 January 2026

Appearances and goals by club, season and competition
Club	Season	League			National cup (Note: Includes Svenska Cupen, Danish Cup, FA Cup)		League cup (Note: Includes EFL Cup)		Other		Total	
Club	Season	Division	Apps	Goals	Apps	Goals	Apps	Goals	Apps	Goals	Apps	Goals
Malmö FF	2022	Allsvenskan	0	0	0	0	—		—		0	0
BK Olympic (loan)	2022	Ettan	27	3	0	0	—		—		27	3
Landskrona BoIS	2023	Superettan	14	1	2	2	—		—		16	3
AaB	2023–24	Danish 1st Division	28	6	3	4	—		—		31	10
AaB	2024–25	Danish Superliga	27	3	4	0	—		—		31	3
AaB	Total		55	9	7	4	—		—		62	13
Swansea City	2025–26	EFL Championship	23	0	1	0	4	0	—		28	0
Career total			119	13	10	6	4	0	0	0	133	19

=== International ===
As of match played 25 March 2025

Appearances and goals by national team and year
National team	Year	Apps	Goals
Sweden	2025	1	0
Total		1	0
