= Eom Ji-sung =

South Korean footballer (born 2002)

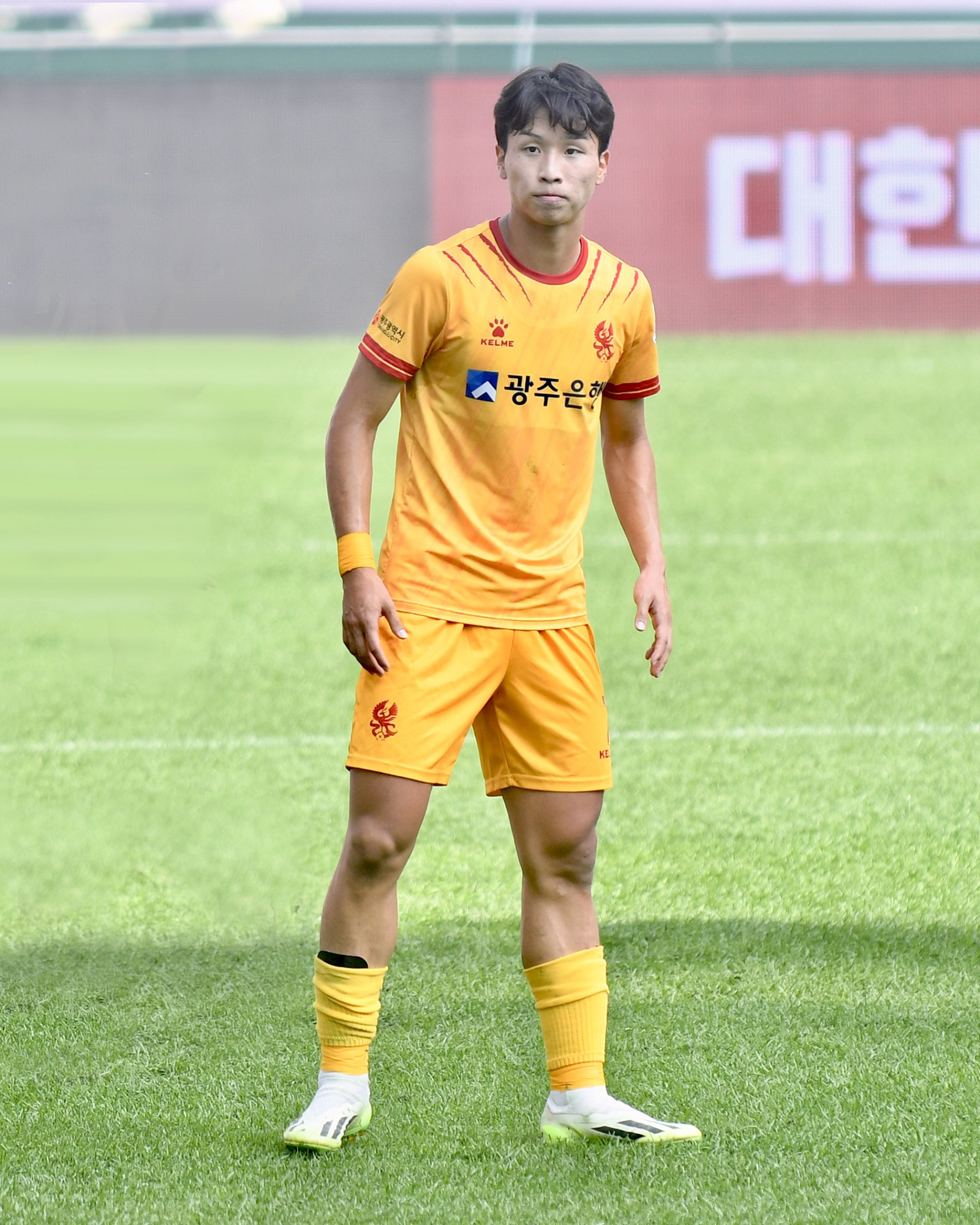
- Eom in 2023

Personal information
- Date of birth: 9 May 2002 (age 24)
- Place of birth: Gimje, South Korea
- Height: 1.78 m (5 ft 10 in)
- Position: Winger

Team information
- Current team: Swansea City
- Number: 10

Youth career
- 2012–2014: Iri Dongsan Elementary School
- 2015: Jungni Middle School
- 2016–2017: Gochangbuk Middle School
- 2018–2020: Gwangju FC (Note: Played for Kumho High School, which was an academy of Gwangju FC.)

Senior career*
Years	Team	Apps	(Gls)
2021–2024	Gwangju FC	108	(20)
2024–	Swansea City	93	(7)

International career^{‡}
2019	South Korea U17	5	(1)
2021–	South Korea U23	20 (Note: Includes five appearances and four goals as an overage player in Asian Games.)	(6)
2022–	South Korea	13	(2)
Medal record
Men's football
Representing South Korea
Asian Games
Gold medal – first place	2026 Aichi–Nagoya
WAFF U-23 Championship
Winner	2024 Saudi Arabia
- * Club domestic league appearances and goals as of 22 November 2026 ‡ National team caps and goals as of 17 November 2026

- Eom Ji-sung
- Hangul: 엄지성
- Hanja: 嚴智星
- RR: Eom Jiseong
- MR: Ŏm Chisŏng
- IPA: [ʌm.d͡ʑi.sʌŋ]

Eom Ji-sung (Korean: 엄지성; born 9 May 2002) is a South Korean footballer currently playing as a winger for EFL Championship club Swansea City and the South Korea national team.

== Club career ==
=== Gwangju FC ===
In 2021, Eom joined the senior team of K League 1 club Gwangju FC. He experienced relegation in his first professional season, but helped Gwangju win the K League 2 the next year. After his contribution to the club's promotion was acknowledged, he was selected for the league's Best XI as well as the Young Player of the Year Award.

=== Swansea City ===
On 15 July 2024, Eom signed for EFL Championship club Swansea City on a four-year deal for an undisclosed fee, reported to be in the region of £1 million by local media. On 8 March 2025, he scored his first goal for the club against Middlesbrough. After his first season at Swansea City, he confessed his performances during the season did not satisfy himself and he had difficulty adapting to a large gap between the level of EFL Championship and K League. But he said he gradually felt his improvement and was finally motivated at the Championship.

== International career ==
In January 2022, Eom was selected for the South Korea national team for the first time ahead of their off-season training. In a friendly against Iceland on 15 January, he made his senior international debut and scored a goal.

Eom was called up to the South Korea squad for the 2026 FIFA World Cup. He played two Group A matches as a substitute.

Eom was selected as one of three overage players for South Korea under-23s for the 2026 Asian Games. He had four goals and four assists in five matches of the tournament including the only goal in the 1–0 final win over Japan, leading his country to win its fourth consecutive title. He qualified for exemption from compulsory military service as an Asian Games gold medalist.

== Style of play ==
He enjoys playing one-on-one with the opposing defender due to his good sense of touch and dribbling skills. He receives the ball from the side and moves to the centre, preferring to play the role of a right-footed winger who mainly plays on the left.

== Career statistics ==
=== Club ===
As of 22 November 2026

Club	Season	League			National cup (Note: Includes Korea Cup, FA Cup)		League cup (Note: Appearances in the EFL Cup)		Other		Total	
Club	Season	Division	Apps	Goals	Apps	Goals	Apps	Goals	Apps	Goals	Apps	Goals
Gwangju FC	2021	K League 1	37	4	0	0	—		—		37	4
Gwangju FC	2022	K League 2	28	9	0	0	—		—		28	9
Gwangju FC	2023	K League 1	28	5	0	0	—		—		28	5
Gwangju FC	2024	K League 1	15	2	0	0	—		—		15	2
Gwangju FC	Total		108	20	0	0	—		—		108	20
Swansea City	2024–25	Championship	37	3	1	0	2	0	—		40	3
Swansea City	2025–26	Championship	44	2	1	1	3	0	—		48	3
Swansea City	2026–27	Championship	12	2	0	0	1	0	—		13	2
Swansea City	Total		93	7	2	1	6	0	—		101	8
Career total			201	27	2	1	6	0	—		209	28

=== International ===
As of match played 17 November 2026

Appearances and goals by national team and year
National team	Year	Apps	Goals
South Korea	2022	1	1
South Korea	2024	2	0
South Korea	2025	3	1
South Korea	2026	7	0
Career total		13	2

Scores and results list South Korea's goal tally first, score column indicates score after each Eom goal.

List of international goals scored by Eom Ji-sung
No.	Date	Venue	Opponent	Score	Result	Competition
1	15 January 2022	Mardan Sports Complex, Antalya, Turkey	Iceland	5–1	5–1	Friendly
2	14 October 2025	Seoul World Cup Stadium, Seoul, South Korea	Paraguay	1–0	2–0	Friendly

== Honours ==
Gwangju FC

- K League 2: 2022

South Korea U23

- WAFF U-23 Championship: 2024
- Asian Games: 2026

Individual

- K League Young Player of the Month: August 2021, August 2023
- K League 2 Young Player of the Year: 2022
- K League 2 Best XI: 2022
- Asian Games top goalscorer: 2026
