= 2024–25 Sheffield United F.C. season =

136th season in existence of Sheffield United FC

Sheffield United
2024–25 season
- Owner: Abdullah Bin Mosaad Al Saud (until December 2024); COH Sport (from December 2024)
- Chairman: Yusuf Giansiracusa (until December 2024) Steven Rosen; Helmy Eltoukhy (from December 2024)
- Manager: Chris Wilder
- Stadium: Bramall Lane
- Championship: 3rd
- Play-offs: Runners-up
- FA Cup: Third round
- EFL Cup: Second round
- Top goalscorer: League: Tyrese Campbell (10); All: Tyrese Campbell (11)
- Highest home attendance: 31,127 (10 November 2024 vs. Sheffield Wednesday)
- Lowest home attendance: 6,126 (9 January 2025 vs. Cardiff City)
- Average home league attendance: 28,087
Home colours	Away colours	Third colours

The 2024–25 season was the 136th season in the history of Sheffield United and their first season back in the Championship following relegation from the Premier League the previous season. In addition to the domestic league, the club also participated in the FA Cup, and the EFL Cup.

== Transfers ==
=== In ===
Date	Pos.	Player	From	Fee	Ref.
4 July 2024	RB	(England) Jamie Shackleton	(England) Leeds United	Free	
11 July 2024	LB	(England) Sam McCallum	(England) Norwich City	Free	
15 July 2024	CF	(Wales) Kieffer Moore	(England) Bournemouth	Undisclosed	
15 July 2024	AM	(England) Callum O'Hare	(England) Coventry City	Free	
19 July 2024	GK	(Republic of Ireland) Henry Molyneux (Note: Signed initially for the Under-21s)	(England) Charlton Athletic	Free	
27 July 2024	LB	(England) Harrison Burrows	(England) Peterborough United	Undisclosed	
11 August 2024	CF	(England) Tyrese Campbell	(England) Stoke City	Free	
15 August 2024	GK	(England) Michael Cooper	(England) Plymouth Argyle	Undisclosed	
5 November 2024	CB	(England) Jamal Baptiste	(England) Manchester City	Free	
23 January 2025	CF	(Republic of Ireland) Tom Cannon	(England) Leicester City	Undisclosed	
3 February 2025	LW	(Peru) Jefferson Cáceres	(Peru) Melgar	Undisclosed	
3 February 2025	LW	(Nigeria) Christian Nwachukwu	(Bulgaria) Botev Plovdiv	Undisclosed	
10 February 2025	LB	(England) Lennon Patterson	(England) Wolverhampton Wanderers	Free	

=== Out ===
Date	Pos	Player	To	Fee	Ref.
11 July 2024	CF	(England) Cameron Archer	(England) Aston Villa	Undisclosed	
21 July 2024	RB	(England) Jayden Bogle	(England) Leeds United	Undisclosed	
22 July 2024	CF	(Ivory Coast) Bénie Traoré	(Switzerland) Basel	Undisclosed	
8 August 2024	CF	(Denmark) William Osula	(England) Newcastle United	Undisclosed	
30 August 2024	CB	(United States) Auston Trusty	(Scotland) Celtic	Undisclosed	
3 January 2025	CM	(Mali) Ismaila Coulibaly	(Austria) LASK	Undisclosed	
13 January 2025	CM	(Tunisia) Anis Ben Slimane	(England) Norwich City	Undisclosed	
4 February 2025	CF	(England) Kurtis Havenhand	(England) Birmingham City	Free	

=== Loaned in ===
Date	Pos.	Player	From	Date until	Ref.
6 August 2024	CB	(Australia) Harry Souttar	(England) Leicester City	End of Season	
7 August 2024	RB	(England) Alfie Gilchrist	(England) Chelsea	End of Season	
16 August 2024	RW	(England) Jesurun Rak-Sakyi	(England) Crystal Palace	End of Season	
20 January 2025	LW	(Chile) Ben Brereton Diaz	(England) Southampton	End of Season	
27 January 2025	DM	(Bangladesh) Hamza Choudhury	(England) Leicester City	End of Season	
29 January 2025	RB	(England) Harry Clarke	(England) Ipswich Town	End of Season	
3 February 2025	CB	(England) Rob Holding	(England) Crystal Palace	End of Season	

=== Loaned out ===
Date	Pos.	Player	To	Date until	Ref.
26 July 2024	CB	(England) Miguel Freckleton	(England) Swindon Town	End of Season	
2 August 2024	RB	(Republic of Ireland) Sam Curtis	(England) Peterborough United	2 January 2025 (Note: On 2 January, Curtis was recalled back from his loan at Peterborough)	
30 August 2024	CM	(Tunisia) Anis Ben Slimane	(England) Norwich City	13 January 2025 (Note: On 13 January, Ben Slimane joined Norwich on a permanent basis)	
30 August 2024	CF	(England) Antwoine Hackford	(England) Port Vale	End of Season	
Summer 2024	CB	(Lithuania) Dovydas Sasnauskas	(England) Buxton	January 2025	
9 September 2024	GK	(Croatia) Ivo Grbić	(Turkey) Çaykur Rizespor	End of Season	
17 January 2025	RB	(Republic of Ireland) Sam Curtis	(Scotland) St Johnstone	End of Season	
3 February 2025	CM	(Wales) Owen Hampson	(Scotland) Dunfermline Athletic	End of Season	
3 February 2025	SS	(England) Louie Marsh	(England) Fleetwood Town	End of Season	

=== Released / Out of Contract ===
Date	Pos.	Player	Subsequent club	Join date	Ref.
30 June 2024	RB	(Greece) George Baldock	(Greece) Panathinaikos	1 July 2024	
30 June 2024	CM	(England) George Dickinson	(England) Hull City	1 July 2024	
30 June 2024	GK	(England) Wes Foderingham	(England) West Ham United	1 July 2024	
30 June 2024	LB	(England) Max Lowe	(England) Sheffield Wednesday	1 July 2024	
30 June 2024	CM	(England) Ben Osborn	(England) Derby County	1 July 2024	
30 June 2024	CF	(England) Daniel Jebbison	(England) Bournemouth (Note: Paid a £1,500,000 compensation training fee)	10 July 2024	
30 June 2024	CF	(Scotland) Oli McBurnie	(Spain) Las Palmas	25 July 2024	
30 June 2024	CB	(England) Ben Drake	(England) Millwall	2 August 2024	
30 June 2024	CM	(Northern Ireland) Oliver Norwood	(England) Stockport County	23 August 2024	
30 June 2024	CB	(England) Chris Basham	Retired	28 August 2024	
30 June 2024	CB	(Republic of Ireland) John Egan	(England) Burnley	10 September 2024	
30 June 2024	GK	(Germany) Jordan Amissah	(Scotland) Ross County	6 December 2024	

== Pre-season and friendlies ==
On 24 May, Sheffield United announced their initial pre-season plans, including four matches against York City, Chesterfield, Harrogate Town and Rotherham United. A fifth was later added, against Huddersfield Town.

Win Draw Loss Fixtures

13 July 2024 Friendly	York City	1–2	Sheffield United	Huntington
12:30 BST	Sinclair 9'	Report	Oné 27'; Osula 76'	Stadium: York Community Stadium; Attendance: 4,755
Note: Kick-off was brought forward from 15:00 due to a horse race meeting in York on the same day.

20 July 2024 Friendly	Chesterfield	0–3	Sheffield United	Chesterfield
15:00 BST		Report	Osula 21'; Dozzell 79'; Hampson 89'	Stadium: SMH Group Stadium; Attendance: 7,619

23 July 2024 Friendly	Harrogate Town	1–4	Sheffield United	Harrogate
19:00 BST	Muldoon 23'		Brooks 11'; O'Hare 35'; Hampson 68'; Marsh 89'	Stadium: Wetherby Road

27 July 2024 Friendly	Rotherham United	1–2	Sheffield United	Rotherham
15:00 BST	Hungbo 48'	Report	Souza 10'; Marsh 89'	Stadium: New York Stadium; Attendance: 6,291

2 August 2024 Friendly	Huddersfield Town	1–1	Sheffield United	Huddersfield
19:45 BST	Wiles 5'	Report	Ahmedhodžić 50'	Stadium: Kirklees Stadium

== Competitions ==
=== Overall record ===
Competition	First match	Last match	Starting round	Record							
Competition	First match	Last match	Starting round	Pld	W	D	L	GF	GA	GD	Win %
Championship	9 August 2024	3 May 2025	Matchday 1	46	28	8	10	63	36	+27	60.87
FA Cup	9 January 2025	9 January 2025	Third round	1	0	0	1	0	1	−1	0.00
EFL Cup	13 August 2024	27 August 2024	First round	2	1	0	1	4	3	+1	50.00
Championship Play-Offs	8 May 2025		First round	3	2	0	1	7	2	+5	66.67
Total				52	31	8	13	74	42	+32	59.62

Source: Soccerway

=== Championship ===
==== League table ====
Pos	Team	Pld	W	D	L	GF	GA	GD	Pts	Promotion, qualification or relegation
1	Leeds United (C, P)	46	29	13	4	95	30	+65	100	Promotion to the Premier League
2	Burnley (P)	46	28	16	2	69	16	+53	100	Promotion to the Premier League
3	Sheffield United	46	28	8	10	63	36	+27	90 (Note: Sheffield United were deducted two points for defaulting on payments to other clubs during the 2022–23 and 2023–24 seasons, with a further two points suspended.)	Qualified for the Championship play-offs
4	Sunderland (O, P)	46	21	13	12	58	44	+14	76	Qualified for the Championship play-offs
5	Coventry City	46	20	9	17	64	58	+6	69	Qualified for the Championship play-offs

Source: English Football League
Rules for classification: 1) Points; 2) Goal difference; 3) Number of goals scored; 4) Head-to-head results; 5) Wins; 6) Away goals; 7) Penalty points (sec 9.5); 8) Number of 12-point sending off offences; 9) Play-off (only if needed to determine promotion/relegation)
(C) Champions; (O) Play-off winners; (P) Promoted

==== Results summary ====
Overall								Home						Away					
Pld	W	D	L	GF	GA	GD	Pts	W	D	L	GF	GA	GD	W	D	L	GF	GA	GD
46	28	8	10	63	36	+27	92	15	4	4	33	17	+16	13	4	6	30	19	+11

Last updated: 25 April 2025.
Source: Soccerway

==== Results by round ====
Round	1	2	3	4	5	6	7	8	9	10	11	12	13	14	15	16	17	18	19	20	21	22	23	24	25	26	27	28	29	30	31	32	33	34	35	36	37	38	39	40	41	42	43	44	45	46
Ground	A	H	A	H	A	H	A	H	H	A	A	H	A	A	H	A	H	H	A	A	H	A	H	H	A	A	H	A	H	A	H	H	A	H	A	H	H	A	H	A	H	A	H	A	A	H
Result	W	D	D	W	W	W	D	W	W	L	L	W	W	W	W	D	W	W	D	W	W	W	L	D	L	W	W	W	L	W	W	W	W	L	W	W	D	W	W	L	L	L	W	L	W	D
Position	10	14	11	8	6	5	6	3	2	4	5	4	3	2	2	3	2	1	1	1	1	1	2	2	3	3	2	2	2	2	2	2	2	2	2	2	2	2	1	2	3	3	3	3	3	3

Source: Soccerway
A = Away; H = Home; W = Win; D = Draw; L = Loss
Notes:
- ^{1} Sheffield United were deducted two points before the season started.

==== Matches ====
On 26 June, the Championship fixtures were announced.

Win Draw Loss Fixtures

9 August 2024 1	Preston North End	0–2	Sheffield United	Preston
20:00 BST	Lindsay (yellow card) 80'	Report	Arblaster 12'; Hamer 55'	Stadium: Deepdale; Attendance: 17,948; Referee: Robert Madley

17 August 2024 2	Sheffield United	2–2	Queens Park Rangers	Sheffield
15:00 BST	Hamer 6', (yellow card) 72'; Moore 13'; Vinícius (yellow card) 31'	Report	Clarke-Salter (yellow card) 11'; Varane (yellow card) 45+1'; Dunne 55'; Colback (yellow card) 79' (yellow-red card) 83'; Dykes 88'	Stadium: Bramall Lane; Attendance: 27,527; Referee: Anthony Backhouse

24 August 2024 3	Norwich City	1–1	Sheffield United	Norwich
15:00 BST	Sargent 22'; Duffy (yellow card) 28'; Amankwah (yellow card) 30'; Núñez (yellow card) 50'; Stacey (yellow card) 52'; McLean (yellow card) 74'	Report	Arblaster 32'; Vinícius (yellow card) 41'; Brooks (yellow card) 67'	Stadium: Carrow Road; Attendance: 26,373; Referee: Josh Smith

1 September 2024 4	Sheffield United	1–0	Watford	Sheffield
15:00 BST	Bachmann 2' (o.g.); Moore (penalty missed) 16'; O'Hare (yellow card) 83'; Ahmedhodžić (yellow card) 85'; Hamer (yellow card) 90+3'; Souttar (yellow card) 90+4'; Cooper (yellow card) 90+5'	Report	Larouci (yellow card) 49'; Sierralta (yellow card) 52'; Jebbison (yellow card) 90+4'	Stadium: Bramall Lane; Attendance: 26,914; Referee: Andrew Kitchen
Note: Fixture was initially scheudled for 31 August, but was moved for live Sky Sports broadcast.

13 September 2024 5	Hull City	0–2	Sheffield United	Kingston upon Hull
20:00 BST	Burns (yellow card) 45+2'	Report	Arblaster (yellow card) 7'; Hamer 15', (yellow card) 27'; McCallum 66'; Brooks (yellow card) 75'; Gilchrist (yellow card) 81'	Stadium: MKM Stadium; Attendance: 22,403; Referee: Peter Bankes
Note: Fixture was initially scheudled for 14 September, but was moved for live Sky Sports broadcast.

21 September 2024 6	Sheffield United	1–0	Derby County	Sheffield
15:00 BST	Vinícius (yellow card) 38'; Hamer 53'; Ahmedhodžić (yellow card) 56'; Moore (yellow card) 86'	Report	Cashin (yellow card) 50'; Elder (yellow card) 80'	Stadium: Bramall Lane; Attendance: 28,685; Referee: Andy Madley

28 September 2024 7	Portsmouth	0–0	Sheffield United	Portsmouth
15:00 BST	McIntyre (yellow card) 2'; Blair (yellow card) 86'	Report	Ahmedhodžić (yellow card) 41'; Vinícius (yellow card) 90+6'	Stadium: Fratton Park; Attendance: 20,330; Referee: Matt Donohue

2 October 2024 8	Sheffield United	1–0	Swansea City	Sheffield
19:45 BST	Hamer (yellow card) 21'; Tymon 44' (o.g.); Souttar (yellow card) 57'; Peck (yellow card) 90+4'	Report	Tymon (yellow card) 31'; Bianchini (yellow card) 82'	Stadium: Bramall Lane; Attendance: 25,112; Referee: Leigh Doughty
Note: Fixture was initially scheudled for 1 October, but was moved due to Swansea playing the Sunday prior.

5 October 2024 9	Sheffield United	2–0	Luton Town	Sheffield
15:00 BST	Rak-Sakyi 12', 52'; Ahmedhodžić (yellow card) 27'; Arblaster (yellow card) 33'	Report	Walters (yellow card) 29'	Stadium: Bramall Lane; Attendance: 27,925; Referee: John Brooks

18 October 2024 10	Leeds United	2–0	Sheffield United	Leeds
20:00 BST	Struijk 69'; Joseph 90'; Firpo (yellow card) 84'	Report	Vinícius (yellow card) 60'; Arblaster (yellow card) 87'	Stadium: Elland Road; Attendance: 36,695; Referee: Lewis Smith

23 October 2024 11	Middlesbrough	1–0	Sheffield United	Middlesbrough
20:00 BST	Latte Lath 80'	Report	Hamer (yellow card) 75'	Stadium: Riverside Stadium; Attendance: 24,303; Referee: Andy Davies
Note: Fixture was initially scheudled for a 19:45 kick-off, but was moved for live Sky Sports broadcast.

26 October 2024 12	Sheffield United	2–0	Stoke City	Sheffield
15:00 BST	Moore 14'; Ahmedhodžić (yellow card) 36'; Campbell (yellow card) 45+2', (goal) 50'; Vinícius (yellow card) 47'; Brewster (yellow card) 75'	Report	Gibson (yellow card) 45'; Koumas (yellow card) 82'	Stadium: Bramall Lane; Attendance: 28,575; Referee: Ben Toner

2 November 2024 13	Blackburn Rovers	0–2	Sheffield United	Blackburn
12:30 GMT	Gueye (yellow card) 75'	Report	Burrows 16'; Robinson (yellow card) 43'; O'Hare (yellow card) 50'; Campbell 64'	Stadium: Ewood Park; Referee: Oliver Langford
Note: Fixture was initially scheudled for a 15:00 kick-off, but was moved for live Sky Sports broadcast.

5 November 2024 14	Bristol City	1–2	Sheffield United	Bristol
19:45 GMT	Mehmeti 75'; Dickie (red card) 90+5'	Report	Cooper (yellow card) 74'; Oné 86', (yellow card) 90+9'; Burrows 90+8'	Stadium: Ashton Gate Stadium; Attendance: 18,736; Referee: John Busby

10 November 2024 15	Sheffield United	1–0	Sheffield Wednesday	Sheffield
12:00 GMT	Burrows (yellow card) 26'; Campbell 50'	Report	Bannan (yellow card) 41'; Valery (yellow card) 57'; Charles (yellow card) 90'	Stadium: Bramall Lane; Attendance: 31,127; Referee: Lewis Smith
Note: Fixture was initially scheudled for 9 November, but was moved for live Sky Sports broadcast.

23 November 2024 16	Coventry City	2–2	Sheffield United	Coventry
12:30 GMT	Bassette 22' (yellow card) 45'; Thomas 80'; Thomas-Asante (yellow card) 60'; Eccles (yellow card) 72'; Rudoni (yellow card) 81'	Report	Campbell 13'; Rak-Sakyi 80'; Ahmedhodžić (red card) 44'; Burrows (yellow card) 60'; Peck (yellow card) 79'	Stadium: Coventry Building Society Arena; Attendance: 28,057; Referee: Darren Bond
Note: Fixture was initially scheduled for a 15:00 kick-off, but was moved for live Sky Sports broadcast.

26 November 2024 17	Sheffield United	3–0	Oxford United	Sheffield
19:45 GMT	O'Hare 10'; Campbell 26'; Rak-Sakyi 58'; Seriki (yellow card) 87'	Report	Goodrham (yellow card) 33'	Stadium: Bramall Lane; Attendance: 25,574; Referee: Leigh Doughty

29 November 2024 18	Sheffield United	1–0	Sunderland	Sheffield
20:00 GMT	Robinson (yellow card) 28'; Souttar (yellow card) 35' (yellow-red card) 45+2'; Hamer (yellow card) 75'; Davies 83', (yellow card) 90+5'; Oné (yellow card) 90+1'	Report	Roberts (penalty missed) 29'; Mepham (red card) 40'; O'Nien (yellow card) 65'; Ballard (yellow card) 90+3'	Stadium: Bramall Lane; Attendance: 28,465; Referee: Gavin Ward
Note: Fixture was initially scheudled for 30 November, but was moved for live Sky Sports broadcast.

8 December 2024 19	West Bromwich Albion	2–2	Sheffield United	West Bromwich
15:00 GMT	Heggem 24', (yellow card) 81'; Fellows 62'; Johnston (yellow card) 66'	Report	Rak-Sakyi (yellow card) 32'; O'Hare 35'; Campbell 37'; Hamer (yellow card) 45'; Gilchrist (yellow card) 48'; Peck (yellow card) 88'	Stadium: The Hawthorns; Attendance: 24,930; Referee: David Webb
Note: Fixture was initially scheudled for 7 December, but was moved for live Sky Sports broadcast.

11 December 2024 20	Millwall	0–1	Sheffield United	Bermondsey
19:45 GMT		Report	Brewster 42'; Robinson (yellow card) 84'; Gilchrist (yellow card) 90+5'	Stadium: The Den; Attendance: 12,734; Referee: Matt Donohue
Note: Fixture was initially scheudled for 10 December, but was moved due to Sheffield United playing the Sunday prior.

14 December 2024 21	Sheffield United	2–0	Plymouth Argyle	Sheffield
15:00 GMT	Hamer 19'; Moore 88' (pen.)	Report	Szűcs (yellow card) 60'; Gyabi (yellow card) 68'	Stadium: Bramall Lane; Attendance: 27,237; Referee: Farai Hallam

21 December 2024 22	Cardiff City	0–2	Sheffield United	Cardiff
15:00 GMT	Siopis (yellow card) 27'; Méïté (yellow card) 45+1'; Bagan (yellow card) 61'	Report	Moore 65', 73'; Peck (yellow card) 50'	Stadium: Cardiff City Stadium; Attendance: 18,312; Referee: Darren Bond

26 December 2024 23	Sheffield United	0–2	Burnley	Sheffield
15:00 GMT	Hamer (yellow card) 36'; Gilchrist (yellow card) 52'; Souttar (yellow card) 59'	Report	Cullen (yellow card) 20'; Brownhill 43'; Flemming 53'	Stadium: Bramall Lane; Attendance: 30,580; Referee: Oliver Langford

29 December 2024 24	Sheffield United	1–1	West Bromwich Albion	Sheffield
12:30 GMT	Brooks 23', (yellow card) 69'; Hamer (yellow card) 40'; Davies (yellow card) 45+2'	Report	Grant 45+1'; Johnston (yellow card) 68'; Styles (yellow card) 86'	Stadium: Bramall Lane; Attendance: 29,123; Referee: Stuart Attwell
Note: Fixture was initially scheudled for a 15:00 kick-off, but was moved for live Sky Sports broadcast.

1 January 2025 25	Sunderland	2–1	Sheffield United	Sunderland
20:00 GMT	Mayenda 27'; Isidor 35', (yellow card) 73'; Hume (yellow card) 52'; O'Nien (yellow card) 77'; Alese (yellow card) 86'	Report	Moore (penalty missed) 14'; O'Nien 32' (o.g.); Robinson (yellow card) 88'	Stadium: Stadium of Light; Attendance: 42,276; Referee: Matt Donohue
Note: Fixture was initially scheudled for a 15:00 kick-off, but was moved for live Sky Sports broadcast.

4 January 2025 26	Watford	1–2	Sheffield United	Watford
15:00 GMT	Ngakia 20'; Louza (yellow card) 42'; Pollock (yellow card) 45+3'	Report	Hamer 13'; Davies (yellow card) 42'; Brooks 53'	Stadium: Vicarage Road; Attendance: 19,937; Referee: David Webb

18 January 2025 27	Sheffield United	2–0	Norwich City	Sheffield
15:00 GMT	Burrows 22', 59' (pen.); Gilchrist (yellow card) 50'	Report	Marcondes (yellow card) 59'; Doyle (yellow card) 88'	Stadium: Bramall Lane; Attendance: 28,239; Referee: Josh Smith

21 January 2025 28	Swansea City	1–2	Sheffield United	Swansea
19:45 GMT	Bianchini 7'; Ronald (yellow card) 65'; Tymon (yellow card) 68'; Cabango (yellow card) 90+4'	Report	Norrington-Davies (yellow card) 20'; Hamer (yellow card) 42'; Brewster 47'; Peck (yellow card) 62'; Burrows 68'; Ahmedhodžić (yellow card) 83'	Stadium: Swansea.com Stadium; Attendance: 13,373; Referee: Dean Whitestone

24 January 2025 29	Sheffield United	0–3	Hull City	Sheffield
20:00 GMT		Report	Crooks 6'; Jacob 63', (yellow card) 81'; Slater (yellow card) 65'; Burrows 88' (o.g.)	Stadium: Bramall Lane; Attendance: 27,448; Referee: Andrew Kitchen
Note: Fixture was initially scheudled for 25 January, but was moved for live Sky Sports broadcasting.

1 February 2025 30	Derby County	0–1	Sheffield United	Derby
15:00 GMT	Harness (yellow card) 70'	Report	Brereton Díaz 49'; Vinícius Souza (yellow card) 70'	Stadium: Pride Park Stadium; Attendance: 29,472; Referee: Tom Nield

8 February 2025 31	Sheffield United	2–1	Portsmouth	Sheffield
15:00 GMT	Hamer 24'; Brereton Díaz (yellow card) 42'; Rak-Sakyi 73'; Clarke (yellow card) 77'; Peck (yellow card) 86'; Ahmedhodžić (yellow card) 90'	Report	Atkinson (yellow card) 25'; Ogilvie 27'	Stadium: Bramall Lane; Attendance: 29,104; Referee: Oliver Langford

12 February 2025 32	Sheffield United	3–1	Middlesbrough	Sheffield
20:00 GMT	Rak-Sakyi 32'; Robinson (yellow card) 43'; Cooper (yellow card) 44'; Brereton Díaz 75'; Ahmedhodžić 87'	Report	Azaz (yellow card) 34'; Edmundson (yellow card) 43'; Burgzorg 45' (pen.); Ayling (yellow card) 73'	Stadium: Bramall Lane; Attendance: 27,124; Referee: Matthew Donohue
Note: Fixture was initially scheudled for a 19:45 kick-off, but was moved for live Sky Sports broadcasting.

15 February 2025 33	Luton Town	0–1	Sheffield United	Luton
15:00 GMT	Nakamba (yellow card) 62'	Report	Ahmedhodžić (yellow card) 22', (goal) 79'; Souza (yellow card) 30'; Clarke (yellow card) 33'	Stadium: Kenilworth Road; Attendance: 11,461; Referee: Lewis Smith

24 February 2025 34	Sheffield United	1–3	Leeds United	Sheffield
20:00 GMT	Meslier 14' (o.g.); Hamer (yellow card) 68'	Report	Tanaka (yellow card) 65', (goal) 89'; Firpo 72'; Piroe 90'	Stadium: Bramall Lane; Attendance: 29,702; Referee: David Webb
Note: Fixture was initially scheudled for 22 February, but was moved for live Sky Sports broadcasting.

1 March 2025 35	Queens Park Rangers	1–2	Sheffield United	Shepherd's Bush
15:00 GMT	Dunne (yellow card) 49'; Frey 72' (pen.); Colback (yellow card) 78'; Lloyd (yellow card) 86'	Report	Brereton Díaz 10', (yellow card) 75'; Choudhury (yellow card) 14'; Campbell 54'; Ahmedhodžić (yellow card) 62'	Stadium: Loftus Road; Attendance: 17,346; Referee: Thomas Kirk

8 March 2025 36	Sheffield United	1–0	Preston North End	Sheffield
15:00 GMT	Campbell 56'	Report	Þórðarson (yellow card) 31'; Porteous (yellow card) 61'; Greenwood (yellow card) 69'; Gibson (yellow card) 90+4'	Stadium: Bramall Lane; Attendance: 27,136; Referee: John Busby

11 March 2025 37	Sheffield United	1–1	Bristol City	Sheffield
20:00 GMT	Campbell 61'; Robinson (yellow card) 90+6'	Report	Sykes 90'; Tanner (yellow card) 90+2'; Dickie (yellow card) 90+6'; Pring (yellow card) 90+8'	Stadium: Bramall Lane; Attendance: 25,070; Referee: Stephen Martin
Note: Fixture was initially scheudled for 12 March, but was moved for live Sky Sports broadcasting.

16 March 2025 38	Sheffield Wednesday	0–1	Sheffield United	Sheffield
12:30 GMT	Paterson (yellow card) 18'; Gassama (yellow card) 59'; Johnson (yellow card) 86'	Report	Brereton Díaz (yellow card) 18'; Seriki (yellow card) 56'; Brewster 64'; Ahmedhodžić (yellow card) 89'	Stadium: Hillsborough Stadium; Attendance: 33,827; Referee: Andrew Kitchen
Note: Fixture was initially scheudled for 15 March, but was pushed back a day.

28 March 2025 39	Sheffield United	3–1	Coventry City	Sheffield
20:00 GMT	Hamer 19'; Campbell 30'; Brewster 62'; Brereton Díaz (yellow card) 65'	Report	Thomas (yellow card) 17'; Allen (yellow card) 65'; Rudoni 90+2'	Stadium: Bramall Lane; Attendance: 30,803; Referee: Oliver Langford
Note: Fixture was initially scheudled for 29 March, but was moved for live Sky Sports broadcasting.

5 April 2025 40	Oxford United	1–0	Sheffield United	Oxford
15:00 BST	Dembélé 38'; ter Avest (yellow card) 52'; Płacheta (yellow card) 74'	Report	Ahmedhodžić (yellow card) 60'; Robinson (yellow card) 90+4'; Hamer (yellow card) 90+6'	Stadium: Kassam Stadium; Attendance: 11,496; Referee: James Linington

8 April 2025 41	Sheffield United	0–1	Millwall	Sheffield
19:45 BST		Report	Coburn 21'; Bryan (yellow card) 45+1'	Stadium: Bramall Lane; Attendance: 25,775; Referee: Sam Allison

12 April 2025 42	Plymouth Argyle	2–1	Sheffield United	Plymouth
12:30 BST	Hardie 81'; Tijani 88'; Pleguezuelo (yellow card) 90+6'	Report	Rak-Sakyi 44'; Clarke (yellow card) 64'	Stadium: Home Park; Attendance: 16,565; Referee: Oliver Langford
Note: Fixture was initially scheduled for a 15:00 kick-off, but was moved for live Sky Sports broadcast.

18 April 2025 43	Sheffield United	2–0	Cardiff City	Sheffield
17:30 BST	Hamer 33'; Choudhury (yellow card) 69'; Brereton Díaz 87'	Report	Fish (yellow card) 25'	Stadium: Bramall Lane; Attendance: 28,201; Referee: Tony Harrington
Note: Fixture was initially scheudled for a 15:00 kick-off, but was moved for live Sky Sports broadcasting.

21 April 2025 44	Burnley	2–1	Sheffield United	Burnley
17:30 BST	Brownhill 28', 44' (pen.); Pires (yellow card) 67'	Report	Hamer (yellow card) 27'; Cannon 37'; Robinson (yellow card) 45+1'; Brewster (yellow card) 90+6'	Stadium: Turf Moor; Attendance: 21,486; Referee: David Webb
Note: Fixture was initially scheudled for a 15:00 kick-off, but was moved for live Sky Sports broadcasting.

25 April 2025 45	Stoke City	0–2	Sheffield United	Stoke-on-Trent
20:00 BST	Pearson (yellow card) 22'; Wilmot (yellow card) 56'; Johansson (yellow card) 58'	Report	Campbell (yellow card) 25'; McCallum 38', (yellow card) 51'; Brooks 87'	Stadium: Bet365 Stadium; Attendance: 24,460; Referee: Jarred Gillett
Note: Fixture was initially scheudled for 26 April, but was moved for live Sky Sports broadcasting.

3 May 2025 46	Sheffield United	1–1	Blackburn Rovers	Sheffield
12:30 BST	Holding (yellow card) 57'; Ahmedhodžić 59'; Davies (yellow card) 78'	Report	Ōhashi 50'	Stadium: Bramall Lane; Attendance: 30,556; Referee: Farai Hallam

==== Play-offs ====
Sheffield United finished 3rd in the regular season, and faced sixth-placed Bristol City in the semi-finals.

Win Draw Loss Fixtures

8 May 2025 Semi-finals First leg	Bristol City	0–3	Sheffield United	Bristol
20:00 BST	Dickie (red card) 45+2'	Report	Burrows 45+3' (pen.); Peck (yellow card) 64'; Brooks 73'; O'Hare 79'	Stadium: Ashton Gate; Attendance: 25,652; Referee: Oliver Langford

12 May 2025 Semi-finals Second leg	Sheffield United	3–0 (6–0 agg.)	Bristol City	Sheffield
20:00 BST	Moore 41'; Hamer 52'; O'Hare 83'	Report	Cornick (yellow card) 90'	Stadium: Bramall Lane; Attendance: 26,543; Referee: Peter Bankes

==== Championship final ====
24 May 2025
15:01 BST

Sheffield United	1–2	Sunderland
Campbell 25'	Report	Mayenda 76'; Watson 90+5'

Wembley Stadium, London
Attendance: 82,718
Referee: Chris Kavanagh

=== FA Cup ===
Sheffield United entered the competition in the third round, and were drawn at home to Cardiff City.

Win Draw Loss Fixtures

9 January 2025 Third round	Sheffield United	0–1	Cardiff City	Sheffield
19:00 GMT		Report	Ashford 19'	Stadium: Bramall Lane; Attendance: 6,126; Referee: Adam Herczeg

=== EFL Cup ===
On 27 June, the draw for the first round was made, with Sheffield United being drawn at home against Wrexham. In the second round, they were drawn away to Barnsley.

Win Draw Loss Fixtures

13 August 2024 First round	Sheffield United	4–2	Wrexham	Sheffield
20:00 BST	Trusty 35'; Brunt 57' (o.g.); Brewster (penalty missed) 69'; Marsh 69'; Slimane 85'; Peck (yellow card) 90+4'	Report	Boyle 29'; McClean (yellow card) 42'; Revan 90+3'; Marriott (yellow card) 90+5'	Stadium: Bramall Lane; Attendance: 11,446; Referee: Keith Stroud

27 August 2024 Second round	Barnsley	1–0	Sheffield United	Barnsley
19:45 BST	de Gevigney (yellow card) 27'; Watters 52'	Report	Marsh (yellow card) 39'	Stadium: Oakwell; Attendance: 10,739; Referee: Tom Reeves

== Statistics ==
=== Appearances and goals ===
As of match played 24 May 2025

Players with no appearances are not included on the list
Italics indicate a loaned in player

No.	Pos	Nat	Player	Total		Championship		FA Cup		EFL Cup		Championship Play-offs	
No.	Pos	Nat	Player	Apps	Goals	Apps	Goals	Apps	Goals	Apps	Goals	Apps	Goals
1	GK	(England) ENG	Michael Cooper	46	0	43	0	0	0	0	0	3	0
2	DF	(England) ENG	Alfie Gilchrist	31	0	26+3	0	1	0	0+1	0	0	0
3	DF	(England) ENG	Sam McCallum	36	2	9+24	2	1	0	1	0	0+1	0
4	MF	(England) ENG	Ollie Arblaster	12	2	11+1	2	0	0	0	0	0	0
5	DF	(England) ENG	Rob Holding	11	0	4+6	0	0	0	0	0	0+1	0
6	DF	(Australia) AUS	Harry Souttar	22	0	20+1	0	0	0	1	0	0	0
7	FW	(England) ENG	Rhian Brewster	42	4	16+20	4	1	0	2	0	2+1	0
8	MF	(Netherlands) NED	Gustavo Hamer	46	10	36+5	9	0	0	0+2	0	3	1
9	FW	(Wales) WAL	Kieffer Moore	30	6	18+9	5	0	0	0	0	3	1
10	MF	(England) ENG	Callum O'Hare	47	4	38+6	2	0	0	0	0	0+3	2
11	FW	(England) ENG	Jesurun Rak-Sakyi	36	7	22+12	7	0	0	1	0	0+1	0
13	GK	(Croatia) CRO	Ivo Grbic	1	0	0	0	0	0	1	0	0	0
14	DF	(England) ENG	Harrison Burrows	49	6	39+5	5	1	0	0+1	0	3	1
15	DF	(Bosnia and Herzegovina) BIH	Anel Ahmedhodžić	42	3	35+3	3	0	0	1	0	3	0
16	DF	(England) ENG	Jamie Shackleton	12	0	2+10	0	0	0	0	0	0	0
17	GK	(Wales) WAL	Adam Davies	5	0	3	0	1	0	1	0	0	0
18	DF	(England) ENG	Harry Clarke	6	0	6	0	0	0	0	0	0	0
19	DF	(England) ENG	Jack Robinson	38	0	31+3	0	0+1	0	0	0	3	0
20	FW	(Chile) CHI	Ben Brereton Diaz	18	4	13+4	4	0	0	0	0	0+1	0
21	MF	(Brazil) BRA	Vinícius Souza	37	0	32+2	0	0	0	0	0	3	0
22	MF	(England) ENG	Tom Davies	16	1	6+7	1	0	0	0	0	0+3	0
23	FW	(England) ENG	Tyrese Campbell	37	11	20+13	10	0	0	0+1	0	2+1	1
24	MF	(Bangladesh) BAN	Hamza Choudhury	19	0	13+3	0	0	0	0	0	3	0
26	DF	(England) ENG	Jamal Baptiste	2	0	0+1	0	1	0	0	0	0	0
28	FW	(Republic of Ireland) IRL	Tom Cannon	17	1	7+8	1	0	0	0	0	1+1	0
33	DF	(Wales) WAL	Rhys Norrington-Davies	17	0	2+12	0	1	0	1+1	0	0	0
34	FW	(England) ENG	Louie Marsh	3	1	0	0	1	0	2	1	0	0
35	MF	(England) ENG	Andre Brooks	28	4	10+12	3	1	0	0+2	0	1+2	1
38	DF	(England) ENG	Femi Seriki	27	0	8+17	0	0	0	1	0	0+1	0
39	FW	(Scotland) SCO	Ryan Oné	14	1	2+10	1	1	0	0+1	0	0	0
41	FW	(England) ENG	Billy Blacker	2	0	0+1	0	1	0	0	0	0	0
42	MF	(England) ENG	Sydie Peck	47	0	32+10	0	0	0	2	0	3	0
43	DF	(England) ENG	Harry Boyes	1	0	0	0	0	0	1	0	0	0
44	MF	(England) ENG	Owen Hampson	3	0	0	0	0+1	0	2	0	0	0
45	DF	(England) ENG	Sai Sachdev	2	0	0+1	0	0	0	1	0	0	0
53	DF	(England) ENG	Sam Colechin	1	0	0	0	0+1	0	0	0	0	0
Player(s) who featured but departed the club permanently during the season:
5	DF	(United States) USA	Auston Trusty	3	1	1	0	0	0	1+1	1	0	0
25	MF	(Tunisia) TUN	Anis Ben Slimane	4	1	0+3	0	0	0	1	1	0	0
29	MF	(Mali) MLI	Ismaila Coulibaly	2	0	0	0	0	0	2	0	0	0

=== Goals ===
As of match played 24 May 2025

Rank	No.	Nat.	Pos.	Player	Championship	FA Cup	EFL Cup	Championship Play-offs	Total
1	23	(England)	FW	Tyrese Campbell	10	0	0	1	11
2	8	(Netherlands)	MF	Gustavo Hamer	9	0	0	1	10
3	11	(England)	FW	Jesurun Rak-Sakyi	7	0	0	0	7
4=	9	(Wales)	FW	Kieffer Moore	5	0	0	1	6
4=	14	(England)	DF	Harrison Burrows	5	0	0	1	6
6=	7	(England)	FW	Rhian Brewster	4	0	0	0	4
6=	10	(England)	MF	Callum O'Hare	2	0	0	2	4
6=	20	(Chile)	FW	Ben Brereton Diaz	4	0	0	0	4
6=	35	(England)	MF	Andre Brooks	3	0	0	1	4
10	15	(Bosnia and Herzegovina)	DF	Anel Ahmedhodžić	3	0	0	0	3
11=	3	(England)	DF	Sam McCallum	2	0	0	0	2
11=	4	(England)	MF	Ollie Arblaster	2	0	0	0	2
13=	22	(England)	MF	Tom Davies	1	0	0	0	1
13=	28	(Republic of Ireland)	FW	Tom Cannon	1	0	0	0	1
13=	39	(Scotland)	FW	Ryan Oné	1	0	0	0	1
13=	5	(United States)	DF	Auston Trusty	0	0	1	0	1
13=	25	(Tunisia)	MF	Anis Ben Slimane	0	0	1	0	1
13=	34	(England)	FW	Louie Marsh	0	0	1	0	1
Own goals					4	0	1	0	5
Totals					63	0	4	7	74
