= 2026–27 Sheffield United F.C. season =

English football club season

Sheffield United
2026–27 season
- Chairman: Steven Rosen; Helmy Eltoukhy
- Manager: Chris Wilder
- Stadium: Bramall Lane
- Championship: 9th
- FA Cup: Third round
- EFL Cup: Third round
- Top goalscorer: League: Patrick Bamford (5); All: Patrick Bamford (6)
- Highest home attendance: 27,684 vs Birmingham City (15 August 2026)
- Lowest home attendance: 25,714 vs Bolton Wanderers, (1 September 2026)
| Home colours | Away colours | Third colours |

The 2026–27 season is the 138th season in the history of Sheffield United and their third consecutive season in the Championship. In addition to the domestic league, the club would also participate in the FA Cup, and the EFL Cup.

== Transfers and contracts ==
=== In ===
| Date | Pos. | Player | From | Fee | Ref. |
|---|---|---|---|---|---|
| 24 June 2026 | CF | (England) Covarne Leon | (England) Basford United | Free transfer | |
| 15 July 2026 | CB | (England) Ben Purches | (England) Bournemouth | Free | |
| 20 July 2026 | RB | (Republic of Ireland) Matt Doherty | (England) Wolverhampton Wanderers | Free | |
| 31 August 2026 | CDM | (Bangladesh) Hamza Choudhury | (England) Leicester City | Undisclosed | |
| 8 September 2026 | CF | (Ghana) Jordan Ayew | (England) Leicester City | Free | |

=== Out ===
| Date | Pos | Player | To | Fee | Ref. |
|---|---|---|---|---|---|
| 25 June 2026 | LW | (Jamaica) Andre Brooks | (England) Norwich City | £8,000,000 | |
| 2 August 2026 | LW | (Nigeria) Christian Nwachukwu | (Azerbaijan) Sabah FK | £500,000 | |
| 11 August 2026 | CM | (Netherlands) Gustavo Hamer | (England) Coventry City | £6,000,000 | |
| 1 September 2026 | GK | (Croatia) Ivo Grbić | (Bulgaria) Ludogorets Razgrad | £850,000 | |
| 1 September 2026 | CAM | (England) Callum O'Hare | (Wales) Wrexham | £6,500,000 | |
| 3 September 2026 | CF | (Eritrea) Siem Eyob-Abraha | (Poland) Cracovia | Undisclosed | |

=== Loaned in ===
| Date | Pos. | Player | From | Until | Ref. |
|---|---|---|---|---|---|
| 8 July 2026 | RW | (England) Romelle Donovan | (England) Brentford | End of Season | |
| 11 August 2026 | DM | (England) Kalvin Phillips | (England) Manchester City | End of Season | |
| 28 August 2026 | FW | (Chile) Ben Brereton Díaz | (England) Southampton | End of Season | |
| 1 September 2026 | CB | (Republic of Ireland) Liam Kitching | (England) Coventry City | End of Season | |

=== Loaned out ===
| Date | Pos. | Player | To | Loaned until | Ref. |
|---|---|---|---|---|---|
| 2 July 2026 | CM | (England) Alex Matos | (Turkey) Göztepe | End of Season | |
| 3 July 2026 | GK | (England) Luke Faxon | (England) Boston United | 4 January 2027 | |
| 15 July 2026 | RB | (Bulgaria) Mihail Polendakov | (Bulgaria) Ludogorets Razgrad | End of Season | |
| 21 July 2026 | RB | (England) Sai Sachdev | (England) Boston United | 4 January 2027 | |
| 27 July 2026 | CB | (England) Zain Tahir | (England) Oldham Athletic | End of Season | |
| 28 July 2026 | LB | (England) Jili Buyabu | (England) Rotherham United | End of Season | |
| 6 August 2026 | CB | (England) Max Asante-Boakye | (England) Matlock Town | 3 October 2026 (Note: On 4 September, Asante-Boakye's initial one-month loan was extended by another month.) | |
| 11 August 2026 | GK | (England) Benjamin Grainger | (England) Hallam | 8 September 2026 | |
| 31 August 2026 | SS | (England) Louie Marsh | (England) Chesterfield | End of Season | |
| 1 September 2026 | RB | (Republic of Ireland) Sam Curtis | (England) Cambridge United | End of Season | |
| 8 September 2026 | RW | (Nigeria) Ehije Ukaki | (Bulgaria) Botev Plovdiv | End of Season | |
| 8 September 2026 | CB | (Sweden) Nils Zätterström | (Poland) Raków Częstochowa | End of Season (Note: Obligation to make move permanent should certain criteria being met.) | |
| 27 October 2026 | CM | (England) Sam Aston | (England) Buxton | 27 November 2026 | |
| 7 November 2026 | CF | (England) Arlo Coubrough | (England) Leverstock Green | 7 December 2026 | |

=== Released / Out of Contract ===
| Date | Pos. | Player | Subsequent club | Joined date | Ref. |
|---|---|---|---|---|---|
| 30 June 2026 | CM | (Wales) Owen Hampson | (England) Hartlepool United | 1 July 2026 | |
| 30 June 2026 | LB | (England) Dylan Tawodzera | (England) Huddersfield Town | 8 July 2026 | |
| 30 June 2026 | CB | (Scotland) Evan Easton | (Scotland) Airdrieonians | 11 July 2026 | |
| 30 June 2026 | LWB | (England) Frankie Jones | (England) Derby County | 17 July 2026 | |
| 30 June 2026 | CF | (England) Danny Ings | (England) Wycombe Wanderers | 25 September 2026 | |
| 30 June 2026 | CM | (England) Jackson Blaize | | | |
| 30 June 2026 | CM | (England) Tom Davies | | | |
| 30 June 2026 | CF | (England) Marshall Francis | | | |
| 30 June 2026 | LB | (England) Franklyn Gordon | | | |
| 30 June 2026 | GK | (England) Liam Hall | | | |
| 30 June 2026 | CF | (England) Riley McLachlan | | | |
| 30 June 2026 | CB | (England) Jayden Prunty | | | |
| 30 June 2026 | RB | (England) Jack Waldron | | | |
| 30 June 2026 | CB | (England) Ben Mee | Retired | | |

=== New Contract ===
| Date | Pos. | Player | Contract expiry | Ref. |
|---|---|---|---|---|
| 18 May 2026 | GK | (Wales) Adam Davies | 30 June 2027 | |
| 2 July 2026 | CDM | (Netherlands) Jaïro Riedewald | 30 June 2027 (Note: Option of an extra year) | |
| 15 July 2026 | CF | (England) Arlo Coubrough | Undisclosed (Note: First professional contract) | |
| 15 July 2026 | GK | (England) Benjamin Grainger | Undisclosed | |
| 15 July 2026 | CF | (Scotland) Cole Hay | Undisclosed | |
| 15 July 2026 | CF | (England) Matthew Poppleton | Undisclosed | |
| 14 August 2026 | CF | (England) Tyrese Campbell | 30 June 2028 | |

== Pre-season and friendlies ==
On 29 May, The Blades announced their first pre-season friendly against 2. Bundesliga side VfL Bochum. Three days later, the club confirmed their completed schedule with further fixtures against FC Halifax Town, Chesterfield, Huddersfield Town and Rotherham United. On 29 June, a behind closed doors fixture against Levante in Spain was added.

Win Draw Loss Fixtures

| 4 July 2026 Friendly | FC Halifax Town | 1–3 | Sheffield United | Halifax |
| 15:00 BST | Coates 63' | Report | Cannon 18'; Campbell 71'; Hamer 90+1' | Stadium: The Shay Stadium; Attendance: 1,862 (inc. 1,113 Blades fans) |

| 11 July 2026 Friendly | Chesterfield | 0–0 | Sheffield United | Whittington Moor |
| 15:00 BST | | Report | | Stadium: SMH Group Stadium; Attendance: 5,882 |

| 17 July 2026 Friendly | Levante | 1–2 | Sheffield United | Valencia, Spain |
| 10:00 CEST | Brugué 80' | Report | Seriki 2'; McCallum 7' | Attendance: 0 (BCD) |

| 21 July 2026 Friendly | Sheffield United | 3–1 | Huddersfield Town | Shirecliffe |
| 12:00 BST | Cannon 60' (pen.); McCallum 67'; Chong 75' | Report | Smith-Sway 3' | Stadium: Randox Health Academy; Attendance: 0 (BCD) |

| 25 July 2026 Friendly | Rotherham United | 0–2 | Sheffield United | Rotherham |
| 15:00 BST | | Report | Chong 43'; O'Hare 53' | Stadium: New York Stadium |

| 1 August 2026 Friendly | VfL Bochum | 0–0 | Sheffield United | Bochum, Germany |
| 16:00 CEST | | Report | Riedewald (yellow card) 33'; McCallum (yellow card) 39' | Stadium: Vonovia Ruhrstadion; Attendance: 11,304 |

== Competitions ==
=== Overall record ===
| Competition | First match | Last match | Starting round | Final position | Record | | | | | | | |
| Competition | First match | Last match | Starting round | Final position | Pld | W | D | L | GF | GA | GD | Win % |
|---|---|---|---|---|---|---|---|---|---|---|---|---|
| Championship | August 2026 | May 2027 | Matchday 1 | TBC | 16 | 7 | 4 | 5 | 25 | 19 | +6 | 43.75 |
| FA Cup | January 2027 | TBC | Third round | TBC | 0 | 0 | 0 | 0 | 0 | 0 | +0 | — |
| EFL Cup | August 2026 | TBC | First round | TBC | 3 | 2 | 0 | 1 | 5 | 2 | +3 | 66.67 |
| Total | | | | | 19 | 9 | 4 | 6 | 30 | 21 | +9 | 47.37 |

Last updated: 15 August 2026
Source: Soccerway

=== Championship ===
==== League table ====
| Pos | Team | Pld | W | D | L | GF | GA | GD | Pts | Promotion, qualification or relegation |
|---|---|---|---|---|---|---|---|---|---|---|
| 7 | Queens Park Rangers | 16 | 7 | 6 | 3 | 25 | 18 | +7 | 27 | Qualification for Championship play-off quarter-finals |
| 8 | Swansea City | 16 | 8 | 3 | 5 | 24 | 20 | +4 | 27 | Qualification for Championship play-off quarter-finals |
| 9 | Sheffield United | 16 | 7 | 4 | 5 | 25 | 19 | +6 | 25 | |
| 10 | West Ham United | 16 | 6 | 6 | 4 | 38 | 24 | +14 | 24 | |
| 11 | Norwich City | 16 | 8 | 0 | 8 | 34 | 25 | +9 | 24 | |

Updated to match(es) played on 21 November 2026. Source: EFL Official Website
Rules for classification: 1) Points; 2) Goal difference; 3) Number of goals scored; 4) Head-to-head results; 5) Wins; 6) Away goals; 7) Penalty points (sec 9.5); 8) Number of 12-point sending off offences; 9) Play-off (only if needed to determine promotion/relegation)

==== Results summary ====
| Overall | | | | | | | | Home | | | | | | Away | | | | | |
| Pld | W | D | L | GF | GA | GD | Pts | W | D | L | GF | GA | GD | W | D | L | GF | GA | GD |
|---|---|---|---|---|---|---|---|---|---|---|---|---|---|---|---|---|---|---|---|
| 16 | 7 | 4 | 5 | 25 | 19 | +6 | 25 | 4 | 2 | 2 | 13 | 7 | +6 | 3 | 2 | 3 | 12 | 12 | 0 |

Last updated: 21 November 2026.
Source: Soccerway

==== Results by round ====
| Round | 1 | 2 | 3 | 4 | 5 | 6 | 7 | 8 | 9 | 10 | 11 | 12 | 13 | 14 | 15 | 16 | 17 | 18 | 19 | 20 | 21 | 22 | 23 | 24 | 25 | 27 | 28 | 29 | 30 | 26^{1} | 31 | 32 | 33 |
|---|---|---|---|---|---|---|---|---|---|---|---|---|---|---|---|---|---|---|---|---|---|---|---|---|---|---|---|---|---|---|---|---|---|
| Ground | H | A | A | H | H | A | H | A | H | A | A | H | H | A | A | H | H | A | H | A | H | A | H | A | A | H | A | H | H | A | A | H | H |
| Result | D | D | D | W | L | W | L | L | W | L | W | D | W | W | L | W | | | | | | | | | | | | | | | | | |
| Position | 16 | 15 | 14 | 9 | 15 | 10 | 14 | 17 | 14 | 15 | 11 | 12 | 10 | 9 | 10 | 9 | | | | | | | | | | | | | | | | | |
| Points | 1 | 2 | 3 | 6 | 6 | 9 | 9 | 9 | 12 | 12 | 15 | 16 | 19 | 22 | 22 | 25 | | | | | | | | | | | | | | | | | |

Source: Soccerway
A = Away; H = Home; W = Win; D = Draw; L = Loss; P = Postponed

==== Matches ====
On 25 June, the Championship fixtures were revealed.

Win Draw Loss Fixtures

| 15 August 2026 1 | Sheffield United | 0–0 | Birmingham City | Sheffield |
| 17:30 BST | | Report | | Stadium: Bramall Lane; Attendance: 27,684; Referee: Gavin Ward |

| 22 August 2026 2 | Swansea City | 0–0 | Sheffield United | Landore |
| 15:00 BST | Fulton (yellow card) 59'; Lissah (yellow card) 90+5' | Report | Burrows (yellow card) 24'; Tanganga (yellow card) 72' | Stadium: Swansea.com Stadium; Attendance: 17,710; Referee: Tom Nield |

| 29 August 2026 3 | Cardiff City | 2–2 | Sheffield United | Leckwith |
| 15:00 BST | Moylan 2', (yellow card) 33'; Robertson (yellow card) 4'; Ashford 38' | | Cannon 4' (pen.); O'Hare 7'; McGuinness (yellow card) 10'; Peck (yellow card) 75' | Stadium: Cardiff City Stadium; Attendance: 21,036; Referee: Josh Busby |

| 1 September 2026 4 | Sheffield United | 3–2 | Bolton Wanderers | Sheffield |
| 19:45 BST | Tanganga 4'; Bamford 68'; Donovan 90+3' | | Simons 1'; Larrazabal (yellow card) 39'; McAtee (yellow card) 49'; Dalby 67' | Stadium: Bramall Lane; Attendance: 25,714; Referee: Tony Harrington |

| 5 September 2026 5 | Sheffield United | 1–3 | Norwich City | Sheffield |
| 15:00 BST | Bamford 23'; Kitching (yellow card) 45+1'; Norrington-Davies (yellow card) 55' | Report | Musaba 8'; McConville (yellow card) 38'; Fisher (yellow card) 38'; Touré 44', (yellow card) 44'; Kvistgaarden 62' | Stadium: Bramall Lane; Attendance: 26,519; Referee: Josh Smith |

| 8 September 2026 6 | Blackburn Rovers | 1–2 | Sheffield United | Blackburn |
| 19:45 BST | Montgomery 20', (yellow card) 59' | Report | Cannon 35'; Peck 44'; Donovan (yellow card) 48'; Tanganga (yellow card) 76' | Stadium: Ewood Park; Attendance: 11,188; Referee: Matt Donohue |

| 13 September 2026 7 | Sheffield United | 0–1 | Wolverhampton Wanderers | Sheffield |
| 12:00 BST | McCallum (yellow card) 2'; Tanganga (yellow card) 48' | Report | Krejčí (yellow card) 17'; Jiménez 90' | Stadium: Bramall Lane; Attendance: 26,244; Referee: Robert Jones |
Note: Fixture was initially scheduled for 12 September, but was rescheduled for live Sky Sports.

| 19 September 2026 8 | Stoke City | 2–1 | Sheffield United | Stoke-on-Trent |
| 12:30 BST | Devenny (yellow card) 32'; Talovierov (yellow card) 43'; Bocat (yellow card) 63'; Galbraith (yellow card) 63'; McGlynn 78'; Gallagher 86' | | Phillips (yellow card) 10', (goal) 51'; Arblaster (yellow card) 54'; Kitching (yellow card) 63'; Norrington-Davies (yellow card) 69' | Stadium: bet365 Stadium; Attendance: 23,360; Referee: Tim Robinson |
Note: Fixture was initially scheduled for a 15:00 kick-off, but was brought forward for live Sky Sports.

| 10 October 2026 9 | Sheffield United | 3–0 | Lincoln City | Sheffield |
| 15:00 BST | McCallum (yellow card) 15'; Kitching (yellow card) 39'; Bamford 43', 77'; Chong 52'; Tanganga (yellow card) 67'; Peck (yellow card) 75' | | McGrandles (yellow card) 26'; Elerewe (yellow card) 67'; Bayliss (yellow card) 76' | Stadium: Bramall Lane; Attendance: 27,180; Referee: Josh Smith |

| 14 October 2026 10 | Portsmouth | 3–2 | Sheffield United | Milton |
| 19:45 BST | Meghoma (yellow card) 27'; Swanson 41'; Segečić 54'; Schmid (yellow card) 60'; Adams (yellow card) 82', (goal) 89' | | Choudhury (yellow card) 35' (red card) 44'; Tanganga 59'; McCallum (yellow card) 60'; Cannon 67' | Stadium: Fratton Park; Attendance: 18,446; Referee: Oliver Langford |

| 17 October 2026 11 | Bristol City | 0–1 | Sheffield United | Ashton Gate |
| 15:00 BST | De Keersmaecker (yellow card) 90+6' | | Arblaster 5'; Bamford (yellow card) 90+10' | Stadium: Ashton Gate Stadium; Attendance: 22,016; Referee: Ben Speedie |

| 24 October 2026 12 | Sheffield United | 1–1 | Derby County | Sheffield |
| 12:30 BST | Kitching (yellow card) 64'; Peck (yellow card) 75'; Bamford 79' | Report | Nyambe (yellow card) 17'; Clark 37', (yellow card) 90+4'; Sanderson (yellow card) 50' (red card) 66' | Stadium: Bramall Lane; Attendance: 26,424; Referee: Steve Martin |
Note: Fixture was initially scheduled for a 15:00 kick-off, but was brought forward for live Sky Sports broadcasting.

| 30 October 2026 13 | Sheffield United | 1–0 | Wrexham | Sheffield |
| 20:00 GMT | Brereton Díaz 30'; Kitching (yellow card) 55'; Phillips (yellow card) 67' | Report | Doyle (yellow card) 27' | Stadium: Bramall Lane; Attendance: 26,512; Referee: David Webb |
Note: Fixture was initially scheduled for 31 October, but was brought forward to the night prior for live Sky Sports broadcasting.

| 3 November 2026 14 | Preston North End | 2–3 | Sheffield United | Preston |
| 19:45 GMT | Leroy 2', (yellow card) 66'; Lang 76' | Report | Peck 27', 37', 45+1' | Stadium: Deepdale; Attendance: 13,723; Referee: John Busby |

| 7 November 2026 15 | Charlton Athletic | 2–1 | Sheffield United | Charlton |
| 15:00 GMT | Alli 12'; McNamara (yellow card) 32'; Bindon (yellow card) 36'; Mwamba (yellow card) 38'; Rankin-Costello (yellow card) 60'; Godden 79' | Report | Ayew 25'; Choudhury (yellow card) 35' | Stadium: The Valley; Referee: Matt Corlett |

| 21 November 2026 16 | Sheffield United | 4–0 | Watford | Sheffield |
| 15:00 GMT | Kitching (yellow card) 2'; Brereton Díaz 5', 8', (yellow card) 51'; Donovan (yellow card) 21'; Ayew 61'; Choudhury (yellow card) 75'; Peck 84'; Tanganga (yellow card) 87'; Cannon (yellow card) 90' | Report | Coulibaly (yellow card) 5'; Payero (yellow card) 8'; Traoré (yellow card) 54'; Pollock (yellow card) 71'; Keben (yellow card) 80'; Mlačić (yellow card) 81'; Bove (yellow card) 86' | Stadium: Bramall Lane; Attendance: 25,119; Referee: Tim Robinson |

| 24 November 2026 17 | Sheffield United | v | Southampton | Sheffield |
| 19:45 GMT | | | | Stadium: Bramall Lane |

| 28 November 2026 18 | Queens Park Rangers | v | Sheffield United | Shepherd's Bush |
| 15:00 GMT | | | | Stadium: MATRADE Loftus Road |

| 4 December 2026 19 | Sheffield United | v | West Ham United | Sheffield |
| 20:00 GMT | | | | Stadium: Bramall Lane |
Note: Fixture was initially scheduled for 5 December, but was brought forward to the night prior for live Sky Sports broadcasting.

| 8 December 2026 20 | Millwall | v | Sheffield United | Bermondsey |
| 19:45 GMT | | | | Stadium: The Den |

| 12 December 2026 21 | Sheffield United | v | Burnley | Sheffield |
| 15:00 GMT | | | | Stadium: Bramall Lane |

| 18 December 2026 22 | West Bromwich Albion | v | Sheffield United | West Bromwich |
| 20:00 GMT | | | | Stadium: The Hawthorns |
Note: Fixture was initially scheduled for 19 December, but was brought forward to the night prior for live Sky Sports broadcasting.

| 26 December 2026 23 | Sheffield United | v | Middlesbrough | Sheffield |
| 12:30 GMT | | | | Stadium: Bramall Lane |
Note: Fixture was initially scheduled for a 15:00 kick-off, but was brought forward for live Sky Sports broadcasting.

| 29 December 2026 24 | Derby County | v | Sheffield United | Derby |
| 19:45 GMT | | | | Stadium: Pride Park Stadium |

| 1 January 2027 25 | Burnley | v | Sheffield United | Burnley |
| 17:30 GMT | | | | Stadium: Turf Moor |
Note: Fixture was initially scheduled for a 15:00 kick-off, but was pushed back for live Sky Sports broadcasting.

| 16 January 2027 26 | Sheffield United | v | Bristol City | Sheffield |
| 15:00 GMT | | | | Stadium: Bramall Lane |

| 23 January 2027 27 | Wrexham | v | Sheffield United | Wrexham |
| 15:00 GMT | | | | Stadium: STōK Cae Ras |

| 26 January 2027 28 | Sheffield United | v | Preston North End | Sheffield |
| 19:45 GMT | | | | Stadium: Bramall Lane |

| 30 January 2027 29 | Sheffield United | v | Charlton Athletic | Sheffield |
| 15:00 GMT | | | | Stadium: Bramall Lane |

| 6 February 2027 30 | Watford | v | Sheffield United | Watford |
| 12:30 GMT | | | | Stadium: Vicarage Road |
Note: Fixture was initially scheduled for a 15:00 kick-off, but it was brought forward for live Sky Sports broadcasting.

| 13 February 2027 31 | Wolverhampton Wanderers | v | Sheffield United | Wolverhampton |
| 15:00 GMT | | | | Stadium: Molineux Stadium |

| 16 February 2027 32 | Sheffield United | v | Portsmouth | Sheffield |
| 19:45 GMT | | | | Stadium: Bramall Lane |

| 20 February 2027 33 | Sheffield United | v | Stoke City | Sheffield |
| 12:30 GMT | | | | Stadium: Bramall Lane |
Note: Fixture was initially scheduled for a 15:00 kick-off, but it was brought forward for live Sky Sports broadcasting.

=== FA Cup ===
As a Championship side, Sheffield United enter the FA Cup in the third round.

Win Draw Loss Fixtures

=== EFL Cup ===
Sheffield United were drawn away to Mansfield Town in the first round, Blackburn Rovers in the second round and Fleetwood Town in the third round.

Win Draw Loss Fixtures

| 9 August 2026 First round | Mansfield Town | 0–3 | Sheffield United | Mansfield |
| 16:00 BST | Reed (yellow card) 63'; Thompson (yellow card) 87' | Report | Bamford 4'; Seriki (yellow card) 37'; McGuinness 71'; O'Hare 89' | Stadium: One Call Stadium; Attendance: 6,908; Referee: Stephen Martin |

| 25 August 2026 Second round | Blackburn Rovers | 1–2 | Sheffield United | Blackburn |
| 19:45 BST | Afolayan 55' | Report | Cannon 20'; Donovan 81' | Stadium: Ewood Park; Attendance: 6,826; Referee: David Webb |

| 16 September 2026 Third round | Fleetwood Town | 1–0 | Sheffield United | Fleetwood |
| 19:45 BST | McCann (yellow card) 23'; Evans (yellow card) 53'; Norrington-Davies 57' (o.g.) | | Norrington-Davies (yellow card) 90+1' | Stadium: Highbury Stadium; Attendance: 2,348; Referee: Ben Speedie |

== Statistics ==
=== Appearances and goals ===
As of match played 7 November 2026

Players with no appearances are not included on the list; italics indicate loaned in player

| No. | Pos | Nat | Player | Total | | Championship | | FA Cup | | EFL Cup | |
| No. | Pos | Nat | Player | Apps | Goals | Apps | Goals | Apps | Goals | Apps | Goals |
|---|---|---|---|---|---|---|---|---|---|---|---|
| 1 | GK | (England) ENG | Michael Cooper | 17 | 0 | 15+0 | 0 | 0+0 | 0 | 2+0 | 0 |
| 2 | DF | (Republic of Ireland) IRL | Matt Doherty | 5 | 0 | 0+2 | 0 | 0+0 | 0 | 2+1 | 0 |
| 3 | DF | (England) ENG | Sam McCallum | 12 | 0 | 8+3 | 0 | 0+0 | 0 | 0+1 | 0 |
| 4 | MF | (England) ENG | Oliver Arblaster | 16 | 1 | 5+8 | 1 | 0+0 | 0 | 1+2 | 0 |
| 5 | DF | (England) ENG | Japhet Tanganga | 17 | 2 | 15+0 | 2 | 0+0 | 0 | 2+0 | 0 |
| 7 | MF | (England) ENG | Joe Rothwell | 10 | 0 | 6+1 | 0 | 0+0 | 0 | 3+0 | 0 |
| 8 | MF | (Bangladesh) BAN | Hamza Choudhury | 11 | 0 | 11+0 | 0 | 0+0 | 0 | 0+0 | 0 |
| 9 | FW | (Republic of Ireland) IRL | Tom Cannon | 17 | 4 | 9+5 | 3 | 0+0 | 0 | 3+0 | 1 |
| 10 | FW | (Ghana) GHA | Jordan Ayew | 8 | 1 | 3+4 | 1 | 0+0 | 0 | 0+1 | 0 |
| 11 | FW | (England) ENG | Romelle Donovan | 16 | 2 | 8+5 | 1 | 0+0 | 0 | 2+1 | 1 |
| 14 | DF | (England) ENG | Harrison Burrows | 8 | 0 | 6+1 | 0 | 0+0 | 0 | 0+1 | 0 |
| 15 | DF | (Republic of Ireland) IRL | Liam Kitching | 10 | 0 | 10+0 | 0 | 0+0 | 0 | 0+0 | 0 |
| 16 | DF | (England) ENG | Jamie Shackleton | 6 | 0 | 0+5 | 0 | 0+0 | 0 | 0+1 | 0 |
| 17 | GK | (Wales) WAL | Adam Davies | 1 | 0 | 0+0 | 0 | 0+0 | 0 | 1+0 | 0 |
| 19 | MF | (Curaçao) CUW | Tahith Chong | 10 | 1 | 7+2 | 1 | 0+0 | 0 | 1+0 | 0 |
| 22 | FW | (Chile) CHI | Ben Brereton Díaz | 14 | 1 | 12+1 | 1 | 0+0 | 0 | 0+1 | 0 |
| 23 | FW | (England) ENG | Tyrese Campbell | 12 | 0 | 2+8 | 0 | 0+0 | 0 | 2+0 | 0 |
| 25 | DF | (Republic of Ireland) IRL | Mark McGuinness | 14 | 1 | 7+4 | 0 | 0+0 | 0 | 3+0 | 1 |
| 26 | FW | (Scotland) SCO | Ryan Oné | 4 | 0 | 0+3 | 0 | 0+0 | 0 | 0+1 | 0 |
| 27 | MF | (England) ENG | Kalvin Phillips | 12 | 1 | 6+5 | 1 | 0+0 | 0 | 0+1 | 0 |
| 30 | DF | (Wales) WAL | Rhys Norrington-Davies | 10 | 0 | 3+4 | 0 | 0+0 | 0 | 3+0 | 0 |
| 33 | DF | (England) ENG | Jamal Baptiste | 5 | 0 | 2+2 | 0 | 0+0 | 0 | 1+0 | 0 |
| 34 | FW | (England) ENG | Louie Marsh | 1 | 0 | 0+0 | 0 | 0+0 | 0 | 1+0 | 0 |
| 38 | DF | (England) ENG | Femi Seriki | 9 | 0 | 2+5 | 0 | 0+0 | 0 | 1+1 | 0 |
| 42 | MF | (England) ENG | Sydie Peck | 17 | 4 | 13+2 | 4 | 0+0 | 0 | 1+1 | 0 |
| 44 | MF | (Netherlands) NED | Jaïro Riedewald | 9 | 0 | 3+4 | 0 | 0+0 | 0 | 2+0 | 0 |
| 45 | FW | (England) ENG | Patrick Bamford | 13 | 6 | 10+1 | 5 | 0+0 | 0 | 1+1 | 1 |
Players who featured but departed the club permanently during the season:
| 10 | MF | (England) ENG | Callum O'Hare | 5 | 2 | 3+0 | 1 | 0+0 | 0 | 1+1 | 1 |

=== Disciplinary record ===
As of match played 7 November 2026

Includes all competitive matches. The list is sorted by squad number when disciplinary points / points per card / number of cards are equal. Players with no cards not included in the list.

| Rank | No. | Pos. | Nat. | Name | Championship | | | FA Cup | | | EFL Cup | | | Total | | |
| Rank | No. | Pos. | Nat. | Name | Yellow card | Second yellow card | Red card | Yellow card | Second yellow card | Red card | Yellow card | Second yellow card | Red card | Yellow card | Second yellow card | Red card |
|---|---|---|---|---|---|---|---|---|---|---|---|---|---|---|---|---|
| 1 | 15 | CB | (Republic of Ireland) | Liam Kitching | 5 | 0 | 0 | 0 | 0 | 0 | 0 | 0 | 0 | 5 | 0 | 0 |
| 2 | 5 | CB | (England) | Japhet Tanganga | 4 | 0 | 0 | 0 | 0 | 0 | 0 | 0 | 0 | 4 | 0 | 0 |
| 3 | 3 | LB | (England) | Sam McCallum | 3 | 0 | 0 | 0 | 0 | 0 | 0 | 0 | 0 | 3 | 0 | 0 |
| 3 | 8 | CDM | (Bangladesh) | Hamza Choudhury | 1 | 1 | 0 | 0 | 0 | 0 | 0 | 0 | 0 | 1 | 1 | 0 |
| 3 | 30 | RB | (Wales) | Rhys Norrington-Davies | 2 | 0 | 0 | 0 | 0 | 0 | 1 | 0 | 0 | 3 | 0 | 0 |
| 3 | 42 | CM | (England) | Sydie Peck | 3 | 0 | 0 | 0 | 0 | 0 | 0 | 0 | 0 | 3 | 0 | 0 |
| 7 | 27 | CDM | (England) | Kalvin Phillips | 2 | 0 | 0 | 0 | 0 | 0 | 0 | 0 | 0 | 2 | 0 | 0 |
| 8 | 4 | CM | (England) | Oliver Arblaster | 1 | 0 | 0 | 0 | 0 | 0 | 0 | 0 | 0 | 1 | 0 | 0 |
| 8 | 11 | RW | (England) | Romelle Donovan | 1 | 0 | 0 | 0 | 0 | 0 | 0 | 0 | 0 | 1 | 0 | 0 |
| 8 | 14 | LB | (England) | Harrison Burrows | 1 | 0 | 0 | 0 | 0 | 0 | 0 | 0 | 0 | 1 | 0 | 0 |
| 8 | 25 | CB | (Republic of Ireland) | Mark McGuinness | 1 | 0 | 0 | 0 | 0 | 0 | 0 | 0 | 0 | 1 | 0 | 0 |
| 8 | 38 | RB | (England) | Femi Seriki | 0 | 0 | 0 | 0 | 0 | 0 | 1 | 0 | 0 | 1 | 0 | 0 |
| 8 | 45 | CF | (England) | Patrick Bamford | 1 | 0 | 0 | 0 | 0 | 0 | 0 | 0 | 0 | 1 | 0 | 0 |
| Total | | | | | 26 | 1 | 0 | 0 | 0 | 0 | 1 | 0 | 0 | 27 | 1 | 0 |
