= 2025–26 Sheffield United F.C. season =

English football club season

Sheffield United
2025–26 season
- Chairman: Steven Rosen; Helmy Eltoukhy
- Manager: Rubén Sellés (until 14 September); Chris Wilder (from 15 September)
- Stadium: Bramall Lane
- Championship: 13th
- FA Cup: Third round
- EFL Cup: First round
- Top goalscorer: League: Patrick Bamford (12); All: Patrick Bamford (13)
- Highest home attendance: 30,457 (22 February 2026 vs Sheffield Wednesday)
- Lowest home attendance: 26,529 (10 November 2024 vs Queens Park Rangers)
Home colours	Away colours	Third colours

The 2025–26 season was the 137th season in the history of Sheffield United and their second consecutive season in the Championship. In addition to the domestic league, the club also participated in the FA Cup and the EFL Cup.

== Managerial changes ==
Prior to the season starting, the club and Chris Wilder mutually agreed to terminate his contract as manager. He was quickly replaced by Rubén Sellés who signed a three-year contract as the manager. Ruben Selles lost his first five games in a row, the worst start in Sheffield United's history and was relieved of his duites on 14 September 2025. A day later, the club re-appointed Chris Wilder as manager on a two-year contract.

== Transfers and contracts ==
=== In ===
Date	Pos.	Player	From	Fee	Ref.
11 June 2025	RW	(Nigeria) Ehije Ukaki	(Bulgaria) Botev Plovdiv	Undisclosed	
7 July 2025	CB	(England) Max Asante-Boakye	(England) Aston Villa	Free	
22 July 2025	RB	(Bulgaria) Mihail Polendakov	(Bulgaria) PFC Septemvri Sofia	Undisclosed	
22 August 2025	CB	(Sweden) Nils Zätterström	(Sweden) Malmö	£2,850,000	
27 August 2025	CF	(England) Danny Ings	(England) West Ham United	Free	
28 August 2025	CB	(England) Japhet Tanganga	(England) Millwall	£7,500,000	
29 August 2025	CAM	(Curaçao) Tahith Chong	(England) Luton Town	Undisclosed	
1 September 2025	CM	(England) Alex Matos	(England) Chelsea	Undisclosed	
1 September 2025	CB	(Republic of Ireland) Mark McGuinness	(England) Luton Town	Undisclosed	
1 September 2025	CB	(England) Ben Mee	(England) Brentford	Free	
3 October 2025	GK	(England) Liam Hall	(Wales) Wrexham	Free	
17 October 2025	CDM	(Netherlands) Jaïro Riedewald	(Belgium) Royal Antwerp	Free	
13 November 2025	CF	(England) Patrick Bamford	(England) Leeds United	Free	
2 February 2026	CM	(England) Joe Rothwell	(Scotland) Rangers	Undisclosed	

Expenditure: ▼ ~ £10,350,000

=== Out ===
Date	Pos	Player	To	Fee	Ref.
5 July 2025	DM	(Brazil) Vinícius Souza	(Germany) Wolfsburg	£13,000,000	
24 July 2025	CB	(Jamaica) Miguel Freckleton	(Scotland) St Mirren	Undisclosed	
5 August 2025	CB	(Bosnia and Herzegovina) Anel Ahmedhodžić	(Netherlands) Feyenoord	£15,600,000	
5 August 2025	CF	(Wales) Kieffer Moore	(Wales) Wrexham	£2,000,000	
15 August 2025	LW	(Peru) Jefferson Cáceres	(Scotland) Dunfermline Athletic	Undisclosed	
1 September 2025	CB	(England) Jack Robinson	(England) Birmingham City	£175,000	

Income: ▲ ≈ £30,775,000 (all fees converted into GBP)

=== Loaned in ===
Date	Pos.	Player	From	Date until	Ref.
4 July 2025	CB	(New Zealand) Tyler Bindon	(England) Nottingham Forest	31 May 2026	
22 July 2025	LW	(England) Louie Barry	(England) Aston Villa	3 January 2026 (Note: On 3 January, Barry was recalled to his parent club Aston Villa)	
4 August 2025	CM	(Senegal) Djibril Soumaré	(Portugal) Braga	31 May 2026 (Note: The deal includes an obligation to buy upon certain criteria being met)	
22 August 2025	CB	(England) Ben Godfrey	(Italy) Atalanta	3 January 2026 (Note: On 3 January, Godfrey was recalled to his parent club Atalanta)	
1 September 2025	RW	(Republic of Ireland) Chiedozie Ogbene	(England) Ipswich Town	31 May 2026	
8 January 2026	RB	(Netherlands) Ki-Jana Hoever	(England) Wolverhampton Wanderers	31 May 2026	
2 February 2026	LB	(Norway) Leo Hjelde	(England) Sunderland	31 May 2026	
2 February 2026	DM	(England) Kalvin Phillips	(England) Manchester City	31 May 2026	

=== Loaned out ===
Date	Pos.	Player	To	Date until	Ref.
21 July 2025	CF	(England) Billy Blacker	(England) Tranmere Rovers	31 May 2026	
7 August 2025	GK	(Croatia) Ivo Grbić	(Turkey) Fatih Karagümrük	31 May 2026	
25 August 2025	LB	(Wales) Rhys Norrington-Davies	(England) Queens Park Rangers	31 May 2026	
29 August 2025	CB	(England) Jamal Baptiste	(England) Rotherham United	31 May 2026	
3 January 2026	CB	(Republic of Ireland) Sam Curtis	(England) Chesterfield	31 May 2026	
12 January 2026	SS	(England) Louie Marsh	(Scotland) Falkirk	31 May 2026	
23 January 2026	CB	(Sweden) Nils Zätterström	(Italy) Genoa	31 May 2026	
28 January 2026	CF	(Scotland) Ryan Oné	(England) Lincoln City	31 May 2026	
1 February 2026	RW	(Nigeria) Ehije Ukaki	(Greece) Atromitos	31 May 2026	
7 February 2026	LW	(Nigeria) Christian Nwachukwu	(Turkey) Serikspor	31 May 2026	

=== Released / Out of Contract ===
Date	Pos.	Player	Subsequent club	Join date	Ref.
30 June 2025	LB	(England) Mekhi Haughton-Parris	(United States) Kentucky Wildcats	1 July 2025	
30 June 2025	GK	(Republic of Ireland) Henry Molyneux	(England) Chatham Town	1 July 2025	
30 June 2025	LB	(England) Harry Boyes	(England) Southend United	2 July 2025	
30 June 2025	CF	(England) Rhian Brewster	(England) Derby County	1 August 2025	
30 June 2025	AM	(England) Ethan Cummings	(England) Abbey Hey		

=== New Contract ===
Date	Pos.	Player	Contract until	Ref.
6 June 2025	CB	(England) Jamal Baptiste	Undisclosed	
7 July 2025	CAM	(England) Jackson Blaize	Undisclosed (Note: First professional contract)	
7 July 2025	CM	(England) Archie Christie-Crainie	Undisclosed	
7 July 2025	RB	(England) Sam Colechin	Undisclosed	
7 July 2025	CF	(Eritrea) Siem Eyob-Abraha	Undisclosed	
7 July 2025	RB	(Wales) Zach Giggs	Undisclosed	
7 July 2025	GK	(England) Coby Hewitson	Undisclosed	
7 July 2025	CDM	(England) Theo Howard	Undisclosed	
7 July 2025	CM	(England) Frankie Jones	Undisclosed	
7 July 2025	CB	(England) Seth Okyere	Undisclosed	
7 July 2025	RM	(England) Aaron Reid	Undisclosed	
9 July 2025	CF	(Scotland) Jevan Beattie	Undisclosed	
9 July 2025	CB	(Lithuania) Dovydas Sasnauskas	Undisclosed	
26 September 2025	RB	(United States) Keehan Barret-Underwood	Undisclosed	
26 September 2025	CB	(England) Alfie Hough	Undisclosed	
15 December 2025	CDM	(Netherlands) Jaïro Riedewald	30 June 2026 (Note: Option of a further year)	
11 January 2026	CF	(England) Patrick Bamford	30 June 2027	

== Pre-season and friendlies ==
On 10 June, Sheffield United announced four pre-season friendlies against York City, Rotherham United, Burton Albion and Chesterfield, along with a training camp in Girona. A behind closed doors fixture against Nice was also added to the schedule.

Win Draw Loss Fixtures

15 July 2025 Friendly	York City	2–6	Sheffield United	Huntington
19:00 BST	Hunt 65'; Fallowfield 69'	Report	Ahmedhodžić 20'; Brooks 22'; Campbell 40'; Oné 49', 83'; Moore 73'	Stadium: York Community Stadium

19 July 2025 Friendly	Rotherham United	0–5	Sheffield United	Rotherham
15:00 BST		Report	Oné 15'; Campbell 49'; Brooks 63'; Cannon 72'; O'Hare 85'	Stadium: New York Stadium

22 July 2025 John Brayford testimonial	Burton Albion	1−2	Sheffield United	Burton upon Trent
19:45 BST	Beesley 19'	Report	Oné 50'; Moore 90'	Stadium: Pirelli Stadium

26 July 2025 Friendly	Chesterfield	1–4	Sheffield United	Chesterfield
15:00 BST	Bonis 37'	Report	Cáceres 4'; Ukaki 13'; Ahmedhodžić 32'; Cannon 52'	Stadium: SMH Group Stadium

30 July 2025 Friendly	Nice	3–2	Sheffield United	Nice, France
18:00 CEST	Sanson 44'; Moffi 68'; Burrows 79' (o.g.)	Report	Campbell 28'; Ukaki 73'	Stadium: OGCN Training and Academy Center; Attendance: 0 (behind closed doors)

== Competitions ==
=== Overall record ===
Competition	First match	Last match	Starting round	Final position	Record							
Competition	First match	Last match	Starting round	Final position	Pld	W	D	L	GF	GA	GD	Win %
Championship	9 August 2025	2 May 2026	Matchday 1	13th	46	18	6	22	66	66	+0	39.13
FA Cup	11 January 2026		Third round	Third round	1	0	0	1	3	4	−1	0.00
EFL Cup	13 August 2025		First round	First round	1	0	0	1	1	2	−1	0.00
Total					48	18	6	24	70	72	−2	37.50

Source: Soccerway

=== Championship ===
==== League table ====
Pos	Team	Pld	W	D	L	GF	GA	GD	Pts
11	Swansea City	46	18	10	18	57	59	−2	64
12	Bristol City	46	17	11	18	59	59	0	62
13	Sheffield United	46	18	6	22	66	66	0	60
14	Preston North End	46	15	15	16	55	62	−7	60
15	Queens Park Rangers	46	16	10	20	61	73	−12	58

Source: EFL Official Website
Rules for classification: 1) Points; 2) Goal difference; 3) Number of goals scored; 4) Head-to-head results; 5) Wins; 6) Away goals; 7) Penalty points (sec 9.5); 8) Number of 12-point sending off offences; 9) Play-off (only if needed to determine promotion/relegation)

==== Results summary ====
Overall								Home						Away					
Pld	W	D	L	GF	GA	GD	Pts	W	D	L	GF	GA	GD	W	D	L	GF	GA	GD
46	18	6	22	66	66	0	60	9	4	10	38	33	+5	9	2	12	28	33	−5

Source: Soccerway

==== Results by round ====
Round	1	2	3	4	5	6	7	8	9	10	11	12	13	14	15	16	17	18	19	20	21	22	23	24	25	27	28	29	30	26^{1}	31	32	33	34	35	36	37	38	39	40	41	42	43	44	45	46
Ground	H	A	H	A	A	H	A	H	A	H	A	A	H	A	H	A	H	A	H	H	A	H	A	A	H	A	A	H	A	H	H	A	H	H	A	H	A	A	H	H	A	H	A	H	H	A
Result	L	L	L	L	L	L	W	L	L	W	W	L	L	L	D	W	W	W	W	D	L	W	L	W	W	L	L	W	D	W	L	W	W	L	W	D	L	D	L	D	L	W	W	L	L	W
Position	24	24	24	24	24	24	24	24	24	23	21	22	22	23	22	22	21	19	18	17	18	18	19	17	15	17	17	17	17	15	16	15	14	16	13	11	13	15	17	17	17	17	12	14	15	13
Points	0	0	0	0	0	0	3	3	3	6	9	9	9	9	10	13	16	19	22	23	23	26	26	29	32	32	32	35	36	39	39	42	45	45	48	49	49	50	50	51	51	54	57	57	57	60

Source: Soccerway
A = Away; H = Home; W = Win; D = Draw; L = Loss; P = Postponed
Notes:
- ^{1} Matchday 26 (v. Oxford United) was postponed due to a frozen pitch.

==== Matches ====
The league fixtures were released on 26 June 2025.

Win Draw Loss Fixtures

9 August 2025 1	Sheffield United	1–4	Bristol City	Sheffield
17:30 BST	Campbell 14'	Report	Twine 5', 51'; McCrorie 26'; Mehmeti 46'	Stadium: Bramall Lane; Attendance: 28,033; Referee: Josh Smith

16 August 2025 2	Swansea City	1–0	Sheffield United	Swansea
15:00 BST	Ronald (yellow card) 23', (goal) 66'	Report	Hamer (yellow card) 16'; Campbell (yellow card) 45+5'; Soumaré (yellow card) 70'	Stadium: Swansea.com Stadium; Attendance: 15,816; Referee: Thomas Kirk

23 August 2025 3	Sheffield United	0–1	Millwall	Sheffield
15:00 BST	Robinson (yellow card) 46'; Hamer (yellow card) 63'; Barry (yellow card) 79'; Campbell (yellow card) 79'; Peck (yellow card) 90+2'	Report	Cundle 38'; Luongo (yellow card) 41'; Neghli (yellow card) 59'	Stadium: Bramall Lane; Attendance: 26,835; Referee: John Busby

30 August 2025 4	Middlesbrough	1–0	Sheffield United	Middlesbrough
12:30 BST	Conway 64'	Report	Peck (yellow card) 18'; Brooks (yellow card) 25'; Hamer (yellow card) 62'	Stadium: Riverside Stadium; Attendance: 26,610; Referee: Lewis Smith
Note: Fixture was initially scheduled for a 15:00 kick-off, but was moved for live Sky Sports broadcast.

12 September 2025 5	Ipswich Town	5–0	Sheffield United	Ipswich
20:00 BST	Philogene 20', 51', 68'; Hirst 61'; J. Clarke 78'	Report	McGuinness (yellow card) 54'; Tanganga (yellow card) 90'	Stadium: Portman Road; Attendance: 28,012; Referee: Farai Hallam
Note: Fixture was initially scheduled for 13 September, but was moved for live Sky Sports broadcast.

20 September 2025 6	Sheffield United	0–1	Charlton Athletic	Sheffield
15:00 BST	Hamer (yellow card) 41'	Report	Bell (yellow card) 39'; Bree (yellow card) 77'; Olaofe 90', (yellow card) 90+1'	Stadium: Bramall Lane; Attendance: 30,165; Referee: Ben Toner

27 September 2025 7	Oxford United	0–1	Sheffield United	Oxford
15:00 BST	Vaulks (yellow card) 84'	Report	O'Hare 65'; Burrows (yellow card) 75'	Stadium: Kassam Stadium; Attendance: 11,352; Referee: Ben Speedie

30 September 2025 8	Sheffield United	1–2	Southampton	Sheffield
19:45 BST	Campbell 28', (yellow card) 36'; Tanganga (yellow card) 45+4'; Peck (yellow card) 90+1'	Report	Manning (yellow card) 37'; Armstrong (penalty missed) 45+5', (yellow card) 67'; Charles (yellow card) 46'; Stewart 51', 58'; Wood (yellow card) 90+5'	Stadium: Bramall Lane; Attendance: 27,053; Referee: Adam Herczeg

4 October 2025 9	Hull City	1–0	Sheffield United	Kingston upon Hull
12:30 BST	Akintola 30'; McBurnie (yellow card) 60'; Egan (yellow card) 88'	Report	O'Hare (yellow card) 46'; McGuinness (yellow card) 60'; Burrows (penalty missed) 88'	Stadium: MKM Stadium; Attendance: 21,030; Referee: Gavin Ward
Note: Fixture was initially scheduled for a 15:00 kick-off, but was moved for live Sky Sports broadcast.

18 October 2025 10	Sheffield United	1–0	Watford	Sheffield
15:00 BST	O'Hare 59'	Report	Keben (yellow card) 54'	Stadium: Bramall Lane; Attendance: 27,431; Referee: Bobby Madley

21 October 2025 11	Blackburn Rovers	1–3	Sheffield United	Blackburn
19:45 BST	Ōhashi 40'; Gardner-Hickman (yellow card) 61'	Report	Henriksson 54' (o.g.); Peck (yellow card) 61'; Burrows 70'; Campbell 90+2'	Stadium: Ewood Park; Attendance: 12,104; Referee: David Webb

24 October 2025 12	Preston North End	3–2	Sheffield United	Preston
20:00 BST	Offiah (yellow card) 29'; Dobbin 45+4'; Tanganga 46' (o.g.); Jebbison 58'; Þórðarson (yellow card) 83'; Storey (yellow card) 85'; Armstrong (yellow card) 90+3'	Report	Brooks 10'; O'Hare 16'; Riedewald (yellow card) 34'	Stadium: Deepdale; Attendance: 16,542; Referee: Farai Hallam
Note: Fixture was initially scheduled for 25 October, but was moved for live Sky Sports broadcast.

1 November 2025 13	Sheffield United	1–3	Derby County	Sheffield
15:00 GMT	Soumaré (yellow card) 62'; Mee (yellow card) 69'; O'Hare 73'	Report	Morris 24', 46', 63' (pen.); Forsyth (yellow card) 35'	Stadium: Bramall Lane; Attendance: 28,473; Referee: Michael Salisbury

4 November 2025 14	Coventry City	3–1	Sheffield United	Coventry
20:00 GMT	Dasilva (yellow card) 27'; Sakamoto (yellow card) 37', (goal) 49'; Thomas 60'; Torp (yellow card) 88'; Thomas-Asante 90+5'	Report	McCallum (yellow card) 11', (goal) 25'; Mee (yellow card) 68'	Stadium: Coventry Building Society Arena; Attendance: 29,589; Referee: James Linington
Note: Fixture was initially scheduled for a 19:45 kick-off, but was moved for live Sky Sports broadcast.

8 November 2025 15	Sheffield United	0–0	Queens Park Rangers	Sheffield
15:00 GMT		Report	Mbengue (yellow card) 45+2'; Varane (yellow card) 63'	Stadium: Bramall Lane; Attendance: 26,529; Referee: Lewis Smith

23 November 2025 16	Sheffield Wednesday	0–3	Sheffield United	Sheffield
12:00 GMT	Iorfa (yellow card) 36'; Fusire (yellow card) 45'; Amass (yellow card) 64'	Report	Campbell 11', 48'; Cannon 90+1'	Stadium: Hillsborough Stadium; Attendance: 32,740; Referee: David Webb
Note: Fixture was initially scheduled for 22 November, but was moved for live Sky Sports broadcast.

26 November 2025 17	Sheffield United	3–0	Portsmouth	Sheffield
19:45 GMT	Peck 41' (pen.); Bamford 54'; Hamer 73'	Report	Devlin (red card) 39'; Kosznovszky (yellow card) 71'	Stadium: Bramall Lane; Attendance: 23,785; Referee: Leigh Doughty

29 November 2025 18	Leicester City	2–3	Sheffield United	Leicester
12:30 GMT	Mavididi 53'; Soumaré (yellow card) 68'; James 83', (yellow card) 89'	Report	Cannon 2'; Riedewald 4'; Peck 32'; McCallum (yellow card) 90+2'	Stadium: King Power Stadium; Attendance: 28,834; Referee: Anthony Backhouse
Note: Fixture was initially scheduled for a 15:00 kick-off, but was moved for live Sky Sports broadcast.

6 December 2025 19	Sheffield United	4–0	Stoke City	Sheffield
15:00 GMT	McGuinness 10'; Seriki 40'; Bamford 44'; Brooks (yellow card) 68'; Peck 77' (pen.)	Report	Tchamadeu (yellow card) 33'; Phillips (yellow card) 75'	Stadium: Bramall Lane; Attendance: 28,044; Referee: Stephen Martin

9 December 2025 20	Sheffield United	1–1	Norwich City	Sheffield
19:45 GMT	Seriki (yellow card) 33'; Ings 50'; Soumaré (yellow card) 77'	Report	Medić (yellow card) 29'; Springett (yellow card) 48'; Soumaré 65' (o.g.); Mattsson (yellow card) 85'	Stadium: Bramall Lane; Attendance: 25,577; Referee: Josh Smith

12 December 2025 21	West Bromwich Albion	2–0	Sheffield United	West Bromwich
20:00 GMT	Heggebø 50'; Grant 61'	Report	Tanganga (yellow card) 65'	Stadium: The Hawthorns; Attendance: 22,217; Referee: Matt Donohue
Note: Fixture was initially scheduled for 13 December, but was moved for live Sky Sports broadcast.

20 December 2025 22	Sheffield United	3–0	Birmingham City	Sheffield
15:00 GMT	Bindon 5'; Hamer 28'; Bamford 51'; Tanganga (yellow card) 90+3'	Report	Neumann (yellow card) 2'; Klarer (yellow card) 11'; Doyle (red card) 18'; Anderson (yellow card) 25'	Stadium: Bramall Lane; Attendance: 28,271; Referee: Simon Hooper

26 December 2025 23	Wrexham	5–3	Sheffield United	Wrexham
17:30 GMT	Bindon 9' (o.g.); Moore 28', 76'; Longman 51', (yellow card) 67'; Windass 81' (pen.)	Report	Bamford 7', 15'; O'Hare 24'; Hamer (yellow card) 65'; Bindon (yellow card) 80'	Stadium: Racecourse Ground; Attendance: 10,611; Referee: Andrew Kitchen
Note: Fixture was initially scheduled for a 15:00 kick-off, but was moved for live Sky Sports broadcast.

29 December 2025 24	Stoke City	1–2	Sheffield United	Stoke-on-Trent
19:45 GMT	Wilmot 65'; Pearson (red card) 88'	Report	Riedewald 47'; Cannon 53'; Seriki (yellow card) 76'	Stadium: Bet365 Stadium; Attendance: 24,206; Referee: John Busby

1 January 2026 25	Sheffield United	3–1	Leicester City	Sheffield
17:30 GMT	Tanganga 36'; Cannon 52'; Seriki (yellow card) 84'; O'Hare 88'	Report	Fatawu (yellow card) 26'; Mavididi (yellow card) 65'; James 90+2'	Stadium: Bramall Lane; Attendance: 29,644; Referee: Farai Hallam
Note: Fixture was initially scheduled for a 15:00 kick-off, but was moved for live Sky Sports broadcast.

17 January 2026 27	Charlton Athletic	1–0	Sheffield United	Charlton
15:00 GMT	Bree (yellow card) 42'; Carey 46'; Jones (yellow card) 52'; Campbell (yellow card) 74'; Rankin-Costello (yellow card) 78'	Report	Soumaré (red card) 35'; Tanganga (red card) 45+2'; Seriki (yellow card) 90+4'	Stadium: The Valley; Attendance: 19,647; Referee: Oliver Langford

21 January 2026 28	Southampton	1–0	Sheffield United	Southampton
19:45 GMT	Scienza 7', (yellow card) 55'; Charles (yellow card) 90+3'; Jander (yellow card) 90+7'	Report	O'Hare (yellow card) 53'	Stadium: St Mary's Stadium; Attendance: 25,967; Referee: Thomas Kirk

24 January 2026 29	Sheffield United	3–1	Ipswich Town	Sheffield
15:00 GMT	O'Hare 38'; Brooks 45+4'; Bamford 66', (yellow card) 75'	Report	Walton (yellow card) 39'; Furlong (yellow card) 45+4'; Kipré (yellow card) 48'; Clarke 60'; Greaves (yellow card) 76'	Stadium: Bramall Lane; Attendance: 28,638; Referee: Tom Nield

31 January 2026 30	Millwall	1–1	Sheffield United	Bermondsey
15:00 GMT	Ivanović 19'; Cooper (yellow card) 78'; De Norre (yellow card) 84'	Report	Brooks 17'; McGuinness (yellow card) 69'	Stadium: The Den; Attendance: 18,007; Referee: Lewis Smith

3 February 2026 26	Sheffield United	3–1	Oxford United	Sheffield
19:45 GMT	Arblaster (yellow card) 17'; Peck 41', (yellow card) 90+1'; Brooks 66'; Ogbene 83'; Cannon (yellow card) 88'	Report	Peart-Harris 13'; Vaulks (yellow card) 43'; Brannagan (yellow card) 76'; Makosso (yellow card) 80'; Konak (yellow card) 90+1'	Stadium: Bramall Lane; Attendance: 26,436; Referee: Anthony Backhouse
Note: Fixture was originally scheduled for a 15:00 kick-off on 4 January, but was moved to 12:00 for live Sky Sports broadcast, and later postponed due to a frozen pitch.

9 February 2026 31	Sheffield United	1–2	Middlesbrough	Sheffield
20:00 GMT	Brooks (yellow card) 65'; Bamford 73'; Phillips (yellow card) 76'; Rothwell (red card) 80'; Hamer (yellow card) 90+2'	Report	Conway 19'; McGree 45'; Brittain (yellow card) 69'; Gilbert (yellow card) 77'	Stadium: Bramall Lane; Attendance: 27,764; Referee: Gavin Ward
Note: Fixture was initially scheduled for 7 February, but was rescheduled for live Sky Sports broadcasting.

14 February 2026 32	Portsmouth	0–1	Sheffield United	Milton
15:00 GMT	Swift (yellow card) 25'	Report	Hamer (yellow card) 45+3'; Soumaré (yellow card) 48'; Phillips (yellow card) 89'; Brooks 90'; Hoever (yellow card) 90+7'	Stadium: Fratton Park; Attendance: 20,092 (1,375 away); Referee: James Linington

22 February 2026 33	Sheffield United	2–1	Sheffield Wednesday	Sheffield
12:00 GMT	Bamford 2'; Burrows 19'; Phillips (red card) 49'; Arblaster (yellow card) 85'	Report	Heskey (yellow card) 16'; Ingelsson (yellow card) 26'; McNeill 53', (yellow card) 65'; Cooper (yellow card) 62'; Otegbayo (yellow card) 82' (yellow-red card) 90'; Moses (yellow card) 90+4'	Stadium: Bramall Lane; Attendance: 30,457; Referee: Josh Smith
Note: Fixture was initially scheduled for 21 February, but was rescheduled for live Sky Sports broadcasting.

25 February 2026 34	Sheffield United	1–2	Coventry City	Sheffield
19:45 GMT	Tanganga (yellow card) 9'; Burrows 48'; Brooks (yellow card) 83'; Campbell (yellow card) 84'	Report	Mason-Clark (yellow card) 9'; Wright 52'; Rudoni 57'; Dasilva (yellow card) 59'	Stadium: Bramall Lane; Attendance: 27,696; Referee: John Busby

28 February 2026 35	Queens Park Rangers	0–2	Sheffield United	Shepherd's Bush
15:00 GMT	Smyth (yellow card) 80'; Morgan (yellow card) 90+3'	Report	O'Hare 13'; Campbell 33'; Hamer (yellow card) 79'; Brooks (yellow card) 90+5'	Stadium: Loftus Road; Attendance: 17,376; Referee: Tom Nield

7 March 2026 36	Sheffield United	1–1	West Bromwich Albion	Sheffield
15:00 GMT	Riedewald (yellow card) 47'; Campbell 53' (o.g.); Hamer (yellow card) 90+5'	Report	Taylor (yellow card) 80'; Campbell 83'	Stadium: Bramall Lane; Attendance: 28,307; Referee: Dean Whitestone

11 March 2026 37	Norwich City	2–1	Sheffield United	Norwich
19:45 GMT	McLean (yellow card) 44'; Stacey 68'; Mattsson (yellow card) 72'; Amankwah 84'	Report	Riedewald 21'; Peck (yellow card) 77'; Hoever (yellow card) 90+3'	Stadium: Carrow Road; Attendance: 25,503 (752 away); Referee: Ben Toner
Note: Fixture was initially scheduled for 10 March, but was rearranged due to Norwich being in FA Cup involvements on the preceding Sunday.

14 March 2026 38	Birmingham City	1–1	Sheffield United	Bordesley
15:00 GMT	Ducksch 25'; Robinson (yellow card) 28'; Klarer (yellow card) 62'	Report	Seriki (red card) 23'; Peck (penalty missed) 30'; Brooks (yellow card) 45+2'; Bamford 45+3'; Tanganga (yellow card) 67'; Burrows (yellow card) 72'; Davies (yellow card) 90+4'	Stadium: St Andrew's; Attendance: 27,588; Referee: Tim Robinson

21 March 2026 39	Sheffield United	1–2	Wrexham	Sheffield
15:00 GMT	Brooks 49'; Riedewald (yellow card) 61'	Report	Windass 54'; Dobson (yellow card) 56'; Smith 78', (yellow card) 79'; Doyle (yellow card) 82'	Stadium: Bramall Lane; Attendance: 27,997; Referee: Sam Allison

3 April 2026 40	Sheffield United	3–3	Swansea City	Sheffield
15:00 GMT	Hamer 16'; Burrows 53'; Cannon 64'; Seriki (yellow card) 90+3'	Report	Vipotnik 24' (pen.); Yalcouyé (yellow card) 45'; Idah 75'; Eom Ji-sung 82'	Stadium: Bramall Lane; Attendance: 26,457; Referee: Dean Whitestone

6 April 2026 41	Bristol City	1–0	Sheffield United	Bristol
15:00 BST	Pring (yellow card) 4'; Sykes 23'	Report	Cannon (yellow card) 20'; Brooks (yellow card) 66'; Bamford (yellow card) 69'	Stadium: Ashton Gate; Attendance: 21,858; Referee: Lewis Smith

11 April 2026 42	Sheffield United	2–1	Hull City	Sheffield
15:00 BST	McGuinness (yellow card) 66'; Tanganga (yellow card) 84'; Hamer 85' (pen.); Ings 88'	Report	McBurnie 5'; Lunstram (yellow card) 66' (yellow-red card) 75'; Ajayi (yellow card) 72'; McBurnie (yellow card) 75'; Pandur (yellow card) 84'; Egan (yellow card) 84'; Coyle (yellow card) 90+7'	Stadium: Bramall Lane; Attendance: 27,850; Referee: John Brooks

18 April 2026 43	Watford	0–2	Sheffield United	Watford
15:00 BST	Louza (yellow card) 26'; Pollock (yellow card) 90+7'	Report	Bamford 50', 59'; Hamer (yellow card) 65'; Ings (yellow card) 75'; Peck (yellow card) 81'; Chong (yellow card) 90+1'	Stadium: Vicarage Road; Attendance: 18,495; Referee: John Busby

22 April 2026 44	Sheffield United	1–3	Blackburn Rovers	Sheffield
19:45 BST	Tanganga (yellow card) 15'; Burrows 57'; Hamer (yellow card) 58'	Report	Ōhashi 12', 45'; Morishita 32', (yellow card) 53'; Ribeiro (yellow card) 82'; Cashin (yellow card) 90+4'; Cantwell (yellow card) 90+4'	Stadium: Bramall Lane; Attendance: 25,987; Referee: Farai Hallam

25 April 2026 45	Sheffield United	2–3	Preston North End	Sheffield
15:00 BST	Hamer 71' (pen.); Bamford 82'	Report	Lindsay 5', 20'; Thompson (yellow card) 16'; Vukčević (yellow card) 32'; Dobbin 76'; Iversen (yellow card) 82'	Stadium: Bramall Lane; Attendance: 27,115; Referee: Andrew Kitchen

2 May 2026 46	Derby County	1–2	Sheffield United	Derby
12:30 BST	Szmodics 5', (yellow card) 90+7'; Langås (yellow card) 18'; Clarke (yellow card) 26'; Clark (yellow card) 89'	Report	Burrows (yellow card) 45+2'; Tanganga (yellow card) 54'; Cannon 62'; Peck 69'; Chong (yellow card) 90+7'	Stadium: Pride Park Stadium; Attendance: 32,538; Referee: Tom Nield

=== FA Cup ===
As a Championship side, Sheffield United entered the FA Cup in the third round, and were drawn at home to League One side Mansfield Town.

Win Draw Loss Fixtures

11 January 2026 Third round	Sheffield United	3–4	Mansfield Town	Sheffield
14:30 GMT	Hamer 20'; Soumaré (yellow card) 54'; Bamford 61'; Moriah-Welsh 65' (o.g.); Campbell (yellow card) 73'	Report	Reed 13', 44'; Akins 50'; Oates 57'; Oshilaja (yellow card) 89'	Stadium: Bramall Lane; Attendance: 17,514; Referee: Gavin Ward

=== EFL Cup ===
As a Championship side, Sheffield United entered the EFL Cup in the first round, and were drawn away to Championship club Birmingham City.

Win Draw Loss Fixtures

13 August 2025 First round	Birmingham City	2–1	Sheffield United	Birmingham
20:00 BST	Furuhashi 5'; Stansfield (yellow card) 73', (goal) 87'; Klarer (yellow card) 90+3'	Report	Robinson (yellow card) 14'; Hamer 72', (yellow card) 90+6'	Stadium: St Andrew's; Attendance: 16,357; Referee: Gavin Ward

== Statistics ==
=== Appearances and goals ===
Players with no appearances are not included on the list; italics indicate loaned in player

No.	Pos	Nat	Player	Total		Championship		FA Cup		EFL Cup	
No.	Pos	Nat	Player	Apps	Goals	Apps	Goals	Apps	Goals	Apps	Goals
1	GK	(England) ENG	Michael Cooper	34	0	34+0	0	0+0	0	0+0	0
2	DF	(England) ENG	Japhet Tanganga	40	1	40+0	1	0+0	0	0+0	0
3	DF	(England) ENG	Sam McCallum	21	1	15+5	1	0+0	0	1+0	0
4	MF	(England) ENG	Oliver Arblaster	22	0	9+12	0	1+0	0	0+0	0
5	DF	(Norway) NOR	Leo Hjelde	8	0	2+6	0	0+0	0	0+0	0
6	DF	(New Zealand) NZL	Tyler Bindon	26	1	22+3	1	0+0	0	0+1	0
7	FW	(Republic of Ireland) IRL	Tom Cannon	37	6	19+17	6	0+0	0	1+0	0
8	MF	(Netherlands) NED	Gustavo Hamer	39	7	27+10	5	1+0	1	0+1	1
9	FW	(England) ENG	Danny Ings	24	2	5+18	2	1+0	0	0+0	0
10	MF	(England) ENG	Callum O'Hare	46	8	41+4	8	0+0	0	1+0	0
11	MF	(Jamaica) JAM	Andre Brooks	41	6	28+11	6	0+1	0	0+1	0
12	DF	(Netherlands) NED	Ki-Jana Hoever	16	0	5+10	0	1+0	0	0+0	0
14	DF	(England) ENG	Harrison Burrows	45	5	30+14	5	1+0	0	0+0	0
15	DF	(England) ENG	Ben Mee	16	0	14+1	0	1+0	0	0+0	0
16	DF	(England) ENG	Jamie Shackleton	3	0	0+3	0	0+0	0	0+0	0
17	GK	(Wales) WAL	Adam Davies	15	0	12+1	0	1+0	0	1+0	0
18	MF	(Senegal) SEN	Djibril Soumaré	27	0	13+12	0	1+0	0	1+0	0
19	FW	(Republic of Ireland) IRL	Chiedozie Ogbene	13	1	9+4	1	0+0	0	0+0	0
20	FW	(Nigeria) NGR	Ehije Ukaki	1	0	0+0	0	0+0	0	1+0	0
22	MF	(England) ENG	Tom Davies	11	0	3+7	0	0+1	0	0+0	0
23	FW	(England) ENG	Tyrese Campbell	36	6	21+13	6	1+0	0	0+1	0
24	MF	(Curaçao) CUW	Tahith Chong	22	0	7+14	0	1+0	0	0+0	0
25	DF	(Republic of Ireland) IRL	Mark McGuinness	26	1	21+4	1	1+0	0	0+0	0
26	FW	(Scotland) SCO	Ryan Oné	7	0	0+6	0	0+0	0	1+0	0
27	MF	(England) ENG	Kalvin Phillips	3	0	2+1	0	0+0	0	0+0	0
28	MF	(England) ENG	Alex Matos	8	0	3+5	0	0+0	0	0+0	0
29	DF	(Republic of Ireland) IRL	Sam Curtis	1	0	0+0	0	0+0	0	1+0	0
33	DF	(Wales) WAL	Rhys Norrington-Davies	1	0	1+0	0	0+0	0	0+0	0
34	FW	(England) ENG	Louie Marsh	1	0	0+0	0	0+0	0	1+0	0
37	DF	(Lithuania) LTU	Dovydas Sasnauskas	1	0	0+0	0	0+0	0	1+0	0
38	DF	(England) ENG	Femi Seriki	39	1	29+9	1	0+1	0	0+0	0
42	MF	(England) ENG	Sydie Peck	41	5	36+4	5	0+0	0	0+1	0
44	MF	(Netherlands) NED	Jaïro Riedewald	26	3	20+5	3	0+1	0	0+0	0
45	FW	(England) ENG	Patrick Bamford	29	13	22+6	12	0+1	1	0+0	0
48	MF	(England) ENG	Joe Rothwell	10	0	4+6	0	0+0	0	0+0	0
Players who featured but departed the club during the season:
5	DF	(England) ENG	Ben Godfrey	4	0	4+0	0	0+0	0	0+0	0
19	DF	(England) ENG	Jack Robinson	4	0	2+1	0	0+0	0	1+0	0
27	FW	(England) ENG	Louie Barry	9	0	6+3	0	0+0	0	0+0	0

=== Goals ===
Rank	No.	Nat.	Pos.	Player	Championship	FA Cup	EFL Cup	Total
1	45	ENG	FW	Patrick Bamford	12	1	0	13
2	10	ENG	MF	Callum O'Hare	8	0	0	8
3	8	NED	MF	Gustavo Hamer	5	1	1	7
4=	7	IRL	FW	Tom Cannon	6	0	0	6
4=	11	JAM	MF	Andre Brooks	6	0	0	6
4=	23	ENG	FW	Tyrese Campbell	6	0	0	6
7	14	ENG	DF	Harrison Burrows	5	0	0	5
7	42	ENG	MF	Sydie Peck	5	0	0	5
9=	44	NED	MF	Jaïro Riedewald	3	0	0	3
10=	9	ENG	FW	Danny Ings	2	0	0	2
11=	2	ENG	DF	Japhet Tanganga	1	0	0	1
11=	3	ENG	DF	Sam McCallum	1	0	0	1
11=	6	NZL	DF	Tyler Bindon	1	0	0	1
11=	11	IRL	FW	Chiedozie Ogbene	1	0	0	1
11=	25	IRL	DF	Mark McGuinness	1	0	0	1
11=	38	ENG	DF	Femi Seriki	1	0	0	1
Own goals					2	1	0	3
Totals					66	3	1	70
