= Femi Seriki =

English footballer

Personal information
- Full name: Oluwafemi Ibrahim Seriki
- Date of birth: 28 April 2002 (age 24)
- Place of birth: Manchester, England
- Height: 1.83 m (6 ft 0 in)
- Position: Wing-back

Team information
- Current team: Sheffield United
- Number: 38

Youth career
- –2019: Bury

Senior career*
Years	Team	Apps	(Gls)
2018–2019	Bury	0	(0)
2019–	Sheffield United	71	(1)
2021	→ Beerschot (loan)	1	(0)
2022	→ Boston United (loan)	11	(0)
2022–2023	→ Rochdale (loan)	29	(0)
2024	→ Rotherham United (loan)	10	(0)
- * Club domestic league appearances and goals as of 11:12, 11 November 2026 (UTC)

Oluwafemi "Femi" Ibrahim Seriki (born 28 April 2003) is an English professional footballer who plays as a right-back for EFL Championship club Sheffield United.

== Club career ==
Seriki started at Bury's academy and had a couple of appearances on their bench before Bury left the English football league in 2019. He transferred to Sheffield United on 26 September 2019. He made his professional debut with Sheffield United as a late sub in a 1–0 Premier League loss to Newcastle United on 19 May 2021. Two days later he signed his first professional contract.

On 12 August 2021, Seriki joined Sheffield United's sister club Beerschot on a season-long loan deal. In November 2021, it was revealed that Seriki had been recalled from his loan spell.

On 22 March 2022, Seriki joined National League North side Boston United on a youth loan for the remainder of the 2021–22 season.

On 15 July 2022, Seriki joined Rochdale on a season-long loan.

On 1 February 2024, Seriki joined Rotherham United on loan until the end of the season.

On 6 December 2025, Seriki scored the first goal of his professional career as Sheffield United defeated Stoke City 4–0 at Bramall Lane.

== Personal life ==
Born in England, Seriki is of Nigerian descent. He has one sister called Seun.

== Career statistics ==
As of match played 25 August 2026

Appearances and goals by club, season and competition
Club	Season	League			FA Cup		League Cup		Other		Total	
Club	Season	Division	Apps	Goals	Apps	Goals	Apps	Goals	Apps	Goals	Apps	Goals
Bury	2018–19	League Two	0	0	0	0	0	0	0	0	0	0
Sheffield United	2019–20	Premier League	0	0	0	0	0	0	—		0	0
Sheffield United	2020–21	Premier League	1	0	0	0	0	0	—		1	0
Sheffield United	2021–22	Championship	1	0	0	0	0	0	0	0	1	0
Sheffield United	2022–23	Championship	0	0	0	0	0	0	—		0	0
Sheffield United	2023–24	Premier League	0	0	1	0	1	0	—		2	0
Sheffield United	2024–25	Championship	25	0	0	0	1	0	1 (Note: Appearance in EFL Championship play-offs)	0	27	0
Sheffield United	2025–26	Championship	38	1	1	0	0	0	—		39	1
Sheffield United	2026–27	Championship	2	0	0	0	2	0	—		4	0
Sheffield United	Total		67	1	2	0	4	0	1	0	74	1
Beerschot (loan)	2021–22	Pro League	1	0	0	0	—		—		1	0
Boston United (loan)	2021–22	National League North	11	0	0	0	0	0	3 (Note: Appearances in National League North play-offs)	0	14	0
Rochdale (loan)	2022–23	League Two	29	0	1	0	2	0	3 (Note: Appearances in EFL Trophy)	0	35	0
Rotherham United (loan)	2023–24	Championship	10	0	—		—		—		10	0
Career total			118	1	3	0	6	0	7	0	134	1
