= Djibril Soumaré =

Senegalese footballer (born 2003)

Personal information
- Full name: El Hadji Djibril Soumaré
- Date of birth: 7 January 2003 (age 23)
- Place of birth: Dakar, Senegal
- Height: 1.85 m (6 ft 1 in)
- Position: Defensive midfielder

Team information
- Current team: Stoke City
- Number: 27

Youth career
- 2020–2022: Sahel Atlantic Academy
- 2021–2022: → Braga (loan)
- 2022–2023: Braga

Senior career*
Years	Team	Apps	(Gls)
2023–2024	Braga B	27	(0)
2023–2026	Braga	0	(0)
2024–2025	→ Nacional (loan)	23	(1)
2025–2026	→ Sheffield United (loan)	25	(0)
2026–	Stoke City	16	(0)

International career^{‡}
2022	Senegal U23	4	(0)
- * Club domestic league appearances and goals as of 20:40, 21 November 2026 (UTC) ‡ National team caps and goals as of 04:04, 27 February 2025 (UTC)

El Hadji Djibril Soumaré (born 7 January 2003) is a Senegalese professional footballer who plays as a defensive midfielder for EFL Championship club Stoke City.

== Career ==
=== Braga ===
A youth product of the Senegalese academy club Sahel Atlantic, Soumaré was loaned to the Braga U19s for the 2021–22 season. On 3 June 2022, he formally transferred to Braga on a four-year contract, and was first assigned to their B-team in Liga 3. In June 2023, he was promoted to Braga's senior team. He debuted with the senior Braga team in a 4–1 UEFA Champions League qualifier victory against Serbian side TSC on 15 August 2023. He played in a 2–0 Taça de Portugal win over Rebordosa on 19 October 2023. He made the matchday squad as Braga won the 2024 Taça da Liga final on 27 January 2024.

In July 2024, Soumaré's contract with Braga was extended until 2028 and he was loaned to Primeira Liga rivals Nacional for the 2024–25 season. He played 25 times for the Madeira-based club, scoring once in a 3–1 victory against AVS. On 4 August 2025, Soumaré was loaned out to EFL Championship club Sheffield United for the 2025–26 season. Soumaré played 27 times for the Blades, as they finished in 13th position.

=== Stoke City ===
Soumaré joined Championship side Stoke City on 25 June 2026, signing a three-year contract.

== International career ==
Soumaré was called up to the Senegal U23s for a set of 2023 U-23 Africa Cup of Nations qualification matches in October 2022.

== Career statistics ==
As of match played 21 November 2026

Appearances and goals by club, season and competition
Club	Season	League			National cup (Note: Includes Taça de Portugal and FA Cup)		League cup (Note: Includes Taça da Liga and EFL Cup)		Europe		Other		Total	
Club	Season	Division	Apps	Goals	Apps	Goals	Apps	Goals	Apps	Goals	Apps	Goals	Apps	Goals
Braga B	2023–24	Liga 3	27	0	—		—		—		—		27	0
Braga	2023–24	Primeira Liga	0	0	1	0	0	0	1 (Note: Appearance(s) in UEFA Champions League)	0	—		2	0
Braga	2024–25	Primeira Liga	0	0	0	0	0	0	0	0	—		0	0
Braga	2025–26	Primeira Liga	0	0	0	0	0	0	0	0	—		0	0
Braga	Total		0	0	1	0	0	0	1	0	—		2	0
Nacional (loan)	2024–25	Primeira Liga	23	1	1	0	1	0	—		—		25	1
Sheffield United (loan)	2025–26	Championship	25	0	1	0	1	0	—		—		27	0
Stoke City	2026–27	Championship	16	0	0	0	2	0	—		—		18	0
Career total			91	1	3	0	4	0	1	0	0	0	99	1

== Honours ==
Braga

- Taça da Liga: 2023–24
