= Tahith Chong =

Curaçaoan footballer (born 1999)

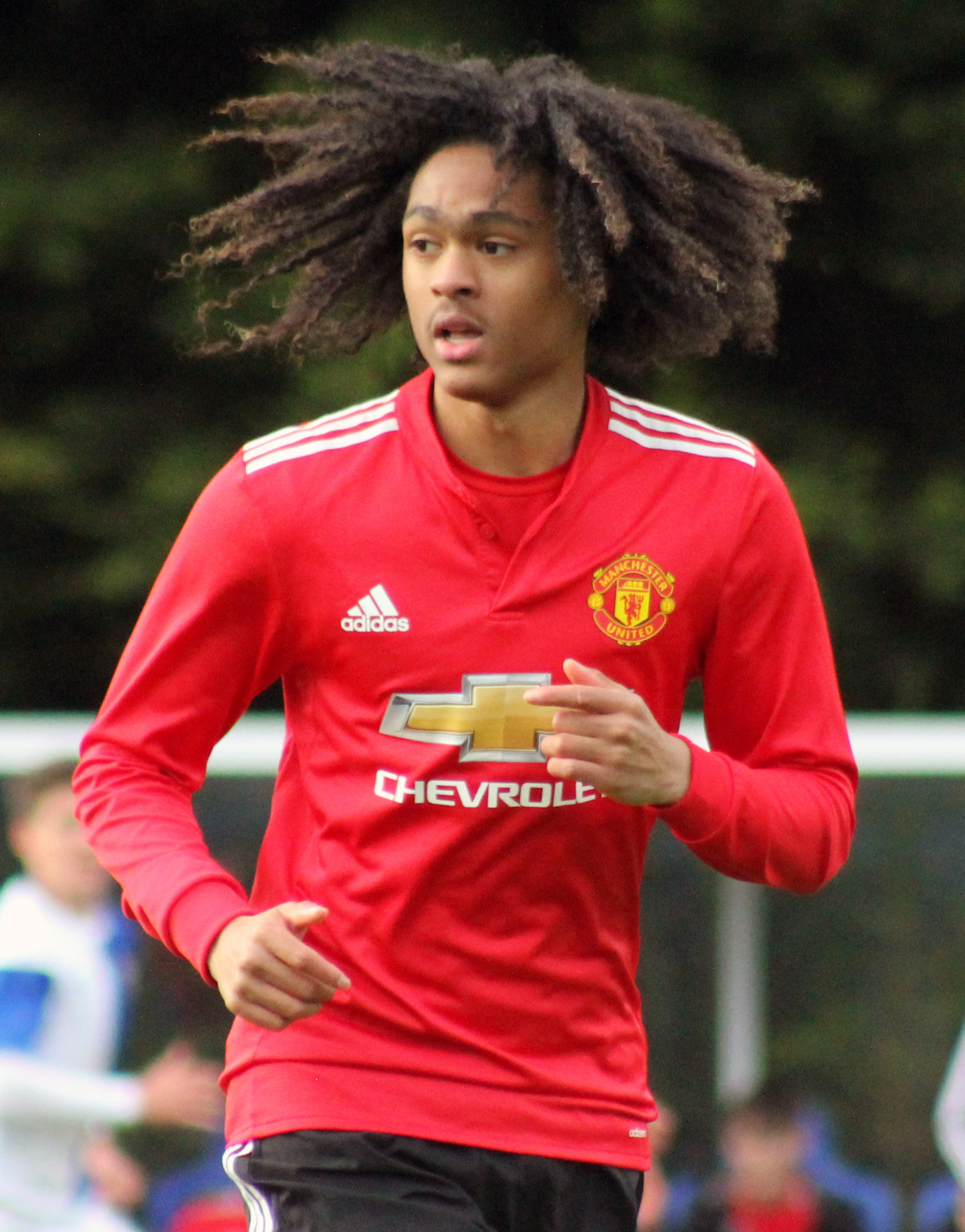
- Chong playing for Manchester United U18s in 2017

Personal information
- Full name: Tahith Jose Girigorio Djorkaef Chong
- Date of birth: 4 December 1999 (age 26)
- Place of birth: Willemstad, Curaçao, Netherlands Antilles
- Height: 1.85 m (6 ft 1 in)
- Positions: Wide midfielder; attacking midfielder

Team information
- Current team: Sheffield United
- Number: 24

Youth career
- Atlétiko Saliña
- –2016: Feyenoord
- 2016–2019: Manchester United

Senior career*
Years	Team	Apps	(Gls)
2019–2022	Manchester United	5	(0)
2020–2021	→ Werder Bremen (loan)	13	(0)
2021	→ Club Brugge (loan)	10	(0)
2021–2022	→ Birmingham City (loan)	20	(1)
2022–2023	Birmingham City	38	(4)
2023–2025	Luton Town	63	(6)
2025–	Sheffield United	31	(1)

International career^{‡}
2013–2014	Netherlands U15	4	(1)
2014–2015	Netherlands U16	11	(1)
2015–2016	Netherlands U17	15	(2)
2016	Netherlands U19	7	(0)
2018	Netherlands U20	4	(1)
2018–2019	Netherlands U21	6	(0)
2025–	Curaçao	12	(4)
- * Club domestic league appearances and goals as of 22:29, 21 November 2026 (UTC) ‡ National team caps and goals as of 21:14, 1 October 2026 (UTC)

Tahith Jose Girigorio Djorkaef Chong (born 4 December 1999) is a Curaçaoan professional footballer who plays as a wide midfielder or attacking midfielder for EFL Championship club Sheffield United and the Curaçao national team.

Chong joined the Manchester United Academy aged 16, after progressing through the Feyenoord youth system. He won both the Jimmy Murphy Young Player of the Year and Denzil Haroun Reserve Player of the Year awards at United. He made his professional debut in 2019, in an FA Cup game against Reading. In August 2020, he joined Werder Bremen on a season-long loan, which was cut short in January 2021 to facilitate a loan move to Club Brugge. He spent the 2021–22 season on loan at Birmingham City, joined the club on a four-year contract in September 2022, and moved on to Luton Town in July 2023. After two seasons with Luton Town, Chong signed for Sheffield United in August 2025.

Chong made more than 40 appearances for the Netherlands national youth teams from under-15 to under-21 level, before switching to Curaçao in 2025. He represented Curaçao at the 2026 FIFA World Cup.

== Early life ==
Chong was born in Willemstad, Curaçao, which was then part of the Netherlands Antilles. He is of Chinese descent. His middle name "Djorkaef" is in reference to Youri Djorkaeff, who Chong's father was a big fan of. He was scouted by Feyenoord while playing for Atlétiko Saliña in Willemstad.

== Club career ==
=== Early career ===
Chong joined the youth ranks of Eredivisie club Feyenoord aged 10, and had attracted interest from several Premier League clubs by the age of 16. In September 2014, Chong took part in the Manchester Premier Cup at the Carrington Training Ground, where he was spotted by Manchester United scouts. In early 2016, Chong was on the verge of joining Chelsea.

=== Manchester United ===
==== Youth ====
In April 2016, Chong announced that he was to join Manchester United after Feyenoord failed to "make a plan" for him. The transfer was made official three months later upon receiving international clearance. Initially linking up with the Under-18s, Chong scored his club's only goal of their 2016–17 FA Youth Cup campaign as they suffered a third round exit to Southampton. The following month, he was ruled out for the remainder of the season after suffering a cruciate ligament injury. Making his return 10 months later for the Under-23s, Chong went on to be named the Jimmy Murphy Young Player of the Year in May 2018.

==== Senior ====
In July 2018, Chong was called up to the first team for their pre-season tour in the United States. In their opening game, he featured as a second-half substitute in a 1–1 draw against Club América, followed by starting in their goalless draw against the San Jose Earthquakes. On 23 October, he was named as an unused substitute for the first time in United's 1–0 defeat to Juventus in the Champions League. Following the appointment of Ole Gunnar Solskjær as caretaker manager, Chong made his competitive debut replacing Juan Mata in a 2–0 FA Cup victory against Reading on 5 January. At the end of the season, he was named the Denzil Haroun Reserve Player of the Year award, becoming the first player since Giuseppe Rossi to win the award the year after being named the Jimmy Murphy Young Player of the Year. On 9 March 2020, Chong signed a new contract to keep him at the club until 2022, with the option to extend a further year.

==== Werder Bremen and Club Brugge loans ====
On 16 August 2020, Chong joined Bundesliga club Werder Bremen on a season-long loan. On 12 September, he scored his first goal in his first competitive match for Werder Bremen against FC Carl Zeiss Jena in the DFB-Pokal. Chong's loan was cut short in January 2021. Chong joined Belgian First Division A club Club Brugge on loan on 30 January, and scored on his debut four days later in a Belgian Cup game against Olsa Brakel.

==== Birmingham City (loan) ====
On 9 July 2021, Chong joined Birmingham City on a season-long loan. However, he spent pre-season ahead of the 2021–22 campaign at his parent club, and joined Birmingham in time for the start of the Championship season. He made his debut for Birmingham in a 1–0 win over Sheffield United on 7 August, and two weeks later, he made two assists in a 5–0 win over Luton Town. On 2 November 2021, Chong returned to Manchester United for his rehabilitation following surgery on a serious groin injury. He returned to Birmingham in February 2022, and two minutes into his first start after his return, away to Bristol City, he opened the scoring in a 2–1 win; it was his only goal for the club. He lasted another month before a hamstring injury kept him out until the last match of the season.

=== Birmingham City ===
On 1 September 2022, Chong signed a four-year contract with Birmingham City for an undisclosed fee.

=== Luton Town ===
On 14 July 2023, Chong signed for newly promoted Premier League side Luton Town for an undisclosed fee. On 5 November 2023, he scored his first Premier League goal in a 1–1 draw against Liverpool.

=== Sheffield United ===
On 29 August 2025, Chong joined EFL Championship side Sheffield United on a four-year deal after Luton were relegated the previous season.

== International career ==
Chong played youth international football for the Netherlands at under-15, under-16, under-17, under-19, under-20 and under-21 levels. He played for the under-17 national team at the 2016 UEFA European Under-17 Championship and scored the only goal in the quarter-final victory against Sweden.

In June 2021, Chong accepted a call-up to the Curaçao national team for their 2021 CONCACAF Gold Cup preliminary squad. However, he was not included in the final squad, which subsequently withdrew from the tournament due to an outbreak of COVID-19.

On 26 August 2025, Chong's request to switch international allegiance to Curaçao was approved by FIFA.

Chong was named in the 26-man Curaçao squad for the 2026 FIFA World Cup. He was the only player born in Curaçao, with all 25 of his teammates born on mainland Netherlands. On 14 June 2026, he played in their opening match against Germany, which resulted in a 7–1 loss.

== Career statistics ==
=== Club ===
As of match played 14 October 2026

Appearances and goals by club, season and competition
Club	Season	League			National cup (Note: Includes FA Cup, DFB-Pokal, Belgian Cup)		League cup (Note: Includes EFL Cup)		Europe		Other		Total	
Club	Season	Division	Apps	Goals	Apps	Goals	Apps	Goals	Apps	Goals	Apps	Goals	Apps	Goals
Manchester United	2018–19	Premier League	2	0	1	0	0	0	1 (Note: Appearance in UEFA Champions League)	0	—		4	0
Manchester United	2019–20	Premier League	3	0	2	0	1	0	6 (Note: Appearances in UEFA Europa League)	0	—		12	0
Manchester United	2020–21	Premier League	0	0	0	0	0	0	0	0	—		0	0
Manchester United	2021–22	Premier League	0	0	0	0	0	0	0	0	—		0	0
Manchester United	Total		5	0	3	0	1	0	7	0	0	0	16	0
Manchester United U21	2019–20	—			—		—		—		4 (Note: Appearances in EFL Trophy)	2	4	2
Werder Bremen (loan)	2020–21	Bundesliga	13	0	2	1	—		—		—		15	1
Club Brugge (loan)	2020–21	Belgian Pro League	10	0	3	1	—		0	0	—		13	1
Birmingham City (loan)	2021–22	Championship	20	1	0	0	0	0	—		—		20	1
Birmingham City	2022–23	Championship	38	4	3	0	—		—		—		41	4
Birmingham City	Total		58	5	3	0	0	0	0	0	0	0	61	5
Luton Town	2023–24	Premier League	33	4	4	1	1	0	—		—		38	5
Luton Town	2024–25	Championship	30	2	0	0	1	0	—		—		31	2
Luton Town	Total		63	6	4	1	2	0	0	0	0	0	69	7
Sheffield United	2025–26	Championship	21	0	1	0	0	0	—		—		22	0
Sheffield United	2026–27	Championship	4	1	0	0	1	0	—		—		5	1
Sheffield United	Total		25	1	1	0	1	0	0	0	0	0	27	1
Career total			174	12	16	3	4	0	7	0	4	2	205	17

=== International ===
As of match played 1 October 2026

Appearances and goals by national team and year
National team	Year	Apps	Goals
Curaçao	2025	2	2
Curaçao	2026	10	2
Total		12	4

Scores and results list Curaçao's goal tally first, score column indicates score after each Chong goal.

List of international goals scored by Tahith Chong
No.	Date	Venue	Opponent	Score	Result	Competition
1	9 September 2025	Ergilio Hato Stadium, Willemstad, Curaçao	Bermuda	1–0	3–2	2026 FIFA World Cup qualification
2	9 September 2025	Ergilio Hato Stadium, Willemstad, Curaçao	Bermuda	2–0	3–2	2026 FIFA World Cup qualification
3	30 May 2026	Hampden Park, Glasgow, Scotland	Scotland	1–0	1–4	Friendly
4	24 September 2026	Ricardo Saprissa Aymá, San José, Costa Rica	Costa Rica	2–3	4–3	2026–27 CONCACAF Nations League A

== Honours ==
Club Brugge

- Belgian First Division A: 2020–21

Individual

- UEFA European Under-17 Championship Team of the Tournament: 2016
- Jimmy Murphy Young Player of the Year: 2017–18
- Denzil Haroun Reserve Player of the Year: 2018–19
- Premier League 2 Player of the Month: December 2019
