= Harrison Burrows =

English footballer

Personal information
- Full name: Harrison James Burrows
- Date of birth: 12 January 2002 (age 24)
- Place of birth: Murrow, England
- Height: 1.80 m (5 ft 11 in)
- Positions: Left-back; left wing-back

Team information
- Current team: Sheffield United
- Number: 14

Youth career
- 2008–2019: Peterborough United

Senior career*
Years	Team	Apps	(Gls)
2019–2024	Peterborough United	148	(14)
2024–	Sheffield United	95	(10)
- * Club domestic league appearances and goals as of 22:28, 21 November 2026 (UTC)

Harrison James Burrows (born 12 January 2002) is an English professional footballer who plays as a left-back or left wing-back for EFL Championship club Sheffield United.

== Career ==
=== Peterborough United ===
Burrows joined the Peterborough United academy at the age of six after attending a development centre. Burrows went on to feature in a pre-season friendly against Ipswich Town in 2017 at just 15 years old. The midfielder signed his first professional contract in January 2019, making his debut for the club in August 2019 in an EFL Cup match against Oxford United. He went on to make his full league debut, aged just 17, in a 4–0 win against MK Dons. During the 2023–24 season, at the age of 22, Burrows was named as Peterborough's club captain. In the 2024 EFL Trophy final, Burrows captained his side and scored two goals in six minutes in a 2–1 win against Wycombe Wanderers at Wembley Stadium. At the end of the 2023–24 season, Burrows was included in the League One Team of the Season and was also named as the division's Player of the Season.

=== Sheffield United ===
On 27 July 2024, Burrows signed for Championship club Sheffield United for an undisclosed fee on a four-year contract. On 2 November 2024, Burrows scored his first goal for Sheffield United in a 2–0 away win over Blackburn Rovers at Ewood Park.

== Career statistics ==
As of match played 22 August 2026

Appearances and goals by club, season and competition
Club	Season	League			FA Cup		League Cup		Other		Total	
Club	Season	Division	Apps	Goals	Apps	Goals	Apps	Goals	Apps	Goals	Apps	Goals
Peterborough United	2019–20	League One	4	0	2	0	1	0	3 (Note: Appearances in EFL Trophy)	0	10	0
Peterborough United	2020–21	League One	21	1	0	0	0	0	6	0	27	1
Peterborough United	2021–22	Championship	37	3	2	0	1	0	0	0	40	3
Peterborough United	2022–23	League One	41	4	3	0	0	0	6 (Note: Appearance(s) in EFL Trophy & League One play-offs)	0	50	4
Peterborough United	2023–24	League One	45	6	4	1	2	0	7	5	58	12
Peterborough United	Total		148	14	11	1	4	0	22	5	185	20
Sheffield United	2024–25	Championship	43	5	1	0	1	0	3 (Note: Appearances in EFL Championship play-offs)	1	48	6
Sheffield United	2025–26	Championship	44	5	1	0	0	0	—		45	5
Sheffield United	2026–27	Championship	2	0	0	0	1	0	—		3	0
Sheffield United	Total		89	10	2	0	2	0	3	1	96	11
Career total			237	24	13	1	6	0	25	6	281	31

== Honours ==
Peterborough United

- EFL Trophy: 2023–24

Individual

- EFL League One Team of the Season: 2023–24
- EFL League One Player of the Season: 2023–24
- EFL Championship Team of the Season: 2024–25
