= Sydie Peck =

English footballer

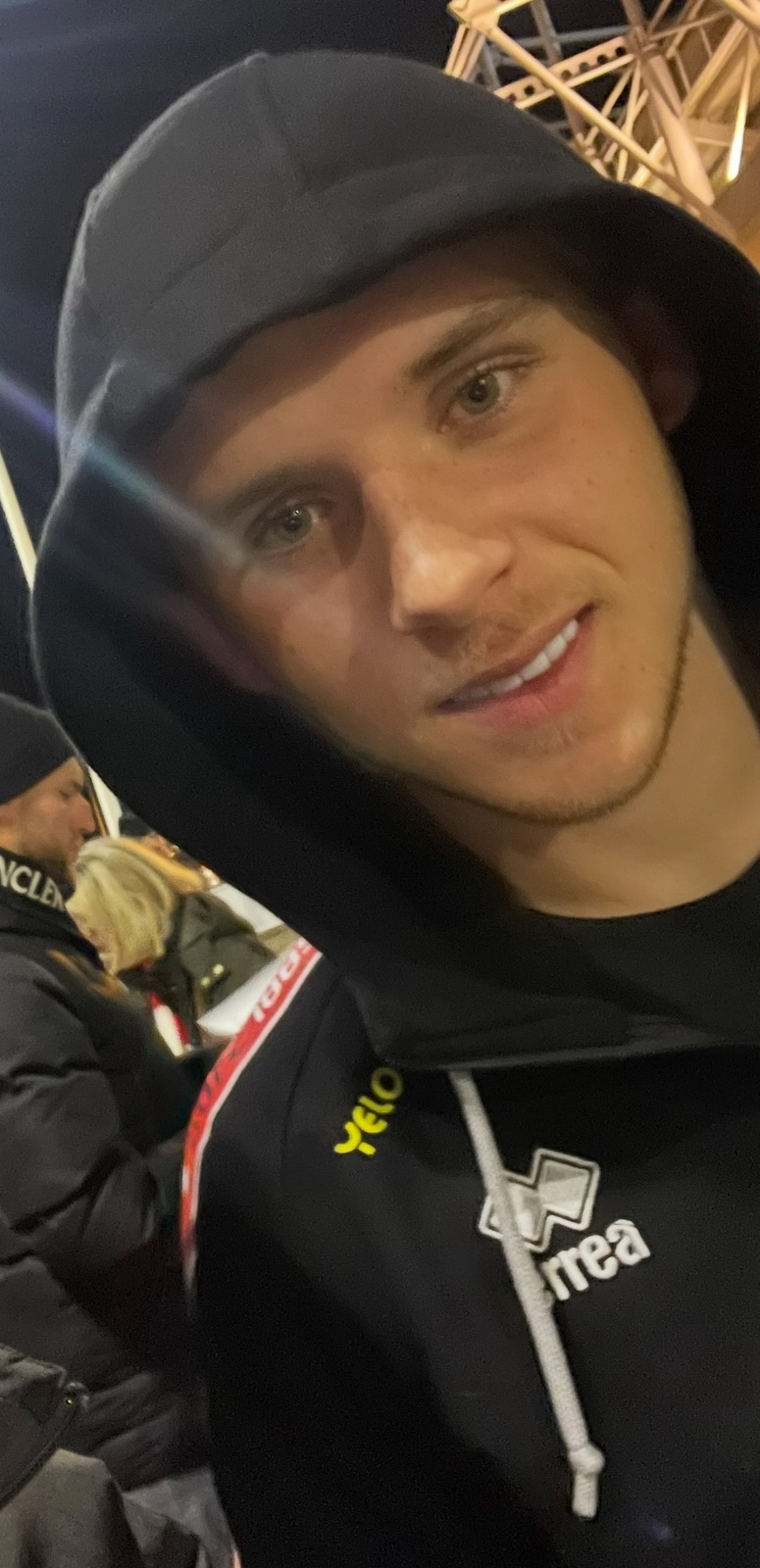
- Sydie Peck in 2024.

Personal information
- Full name: Sydie Frederick Peck
- Date of birth: 13 September 2004 (age 22)
- Place of birth: Enfield, London, England
- Height: 5 ft 8 in (1.73 m)
- Position: Midfielder

Team information
- Current team: Sheffield United
- Number: 42

Youth career
- 2010–2021: Arsenal
- 2021–2022: Sheffield United

Senior career*
Years	Team	Apps	(Gls)
2022–	Sheffield United	99	(10)
2022–2023	→ Oldham Athletic (loan)	9	(0)

International career^{‡}
2022	England U17	2	(0)
2024–2025	England U20	4	(2)
2025–	England U21	11	(0)
- * Club domestic league appearances and goals as of 22:32, 21 November 2026 (UTC) ‡ National team caps and goals as of 23:57, 16 November 2026 (UTC)

Sydie Frederick Peck (born 13 September 2004) is an English professional footballer who plays as a midfielder for EFL Championship club Sheffield United.

== Club career ==
=== Sheffield United ===
Peck is a youth product of Arsenal and moved over to the academy of Sheffield United on 15 July 2021. He joined Oldham Athletic on a short-term loan in the National League on 11 November 2022. After an impressive start where he played all of the available matches for Oldham, he extended his loan for another month on 9 January 2023. On 30 January 2023, he was recalled to his parent club Sheffield United after making 9 appearances for Oldham Athletic.

Peck debuted with Sheffield United as a substitute in a 1–0 Premier League win over Brentford on 9 December 2023. On 17 August 2024, he signed a new four-year contract with the club. He scored his first goal for the club on 26 November 2025, in a 3–0 win against Portsmouth. He scored his first career hat-trick on 3 November 2026, scoring all three goals in a 3–2 win against Preston North End.

== International career ==
Peck was called up to the England U17s in June 2022. On 15 November 2024, Peck made a goalscoring England U20 debut during a 4–0 win over Germany at Chesterfield.

Peck made his debut for England U21 in a 2–0 victory against Kazakhstan on 8 September 2025 as a substitute.

== Career statistics ==
As of match played 21 November 2026

Appearances and goals by club, season and competition
Club	Season	League			FA Cup		EFL Cup		Other		Total	
Club	Season	Division	Apps	Goals	Apps	Goals	Apps	Goals	Apps	Goals	Apps	Goals
Sheffield United	2022–23	Championship	0	0	0	0	0	0	0	0	0	0
Sheffield United	2023–24	Premier League	1	0	0	0	0	0	—		1	0
Sheffield United	2024–25	Championship	42	0	0	0	2	0	3 (Note: Appearances in EFL Championship play-offs)	0	47	0
Sheffield United	2025–26	Championship	40	5	0	0	1	0	—		41	5
Sheffield United	2026–27	Championship	16	5	0	0	2	0	—		18	5
Sheffield United	Total		99	10	0	0	5	0	3	0	107	10
Oldham Athletic (loan)	2022–23	National League	9	0	0	0	—		—		9	0
Career total			108	10	0	0	5	0	3	0	116	10
