= Andre Brooks =

Jamaican footballer (born 2003)

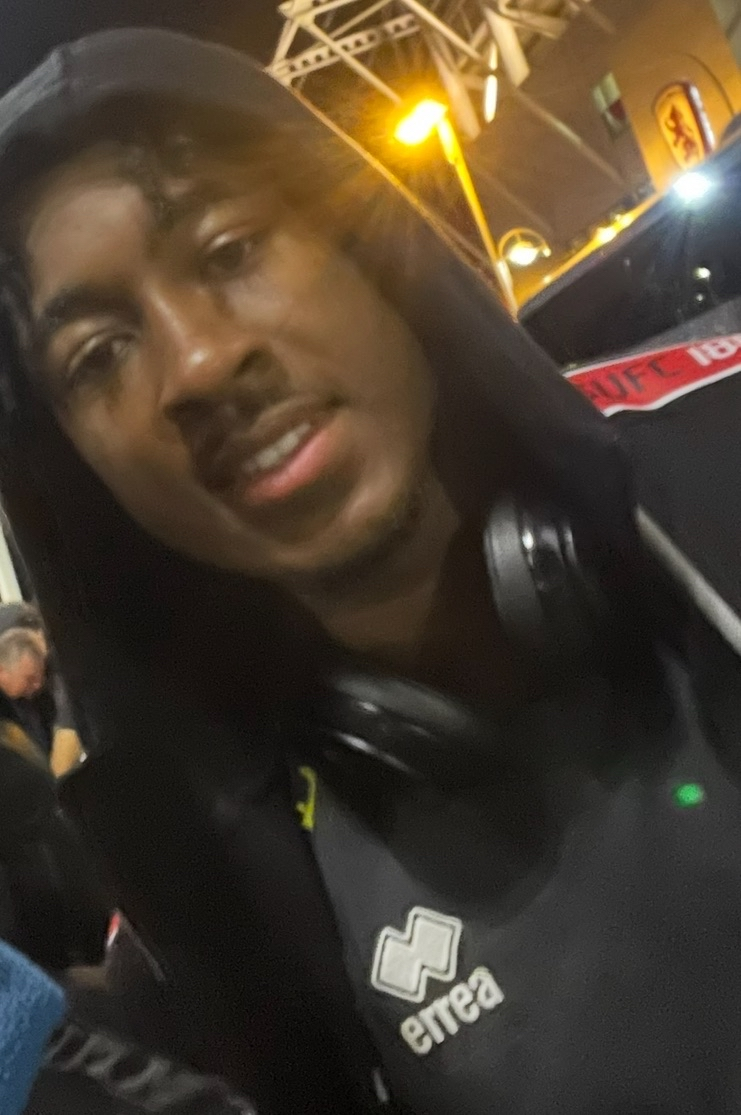
- Brooks in 2024.

Personal information
- Full name: Andre Chance Brooks
- Date of birth: 20 August 2003 (age 23)
- Place of birth: Sheffield, England
- Height: 1.80 m (5 ft 11 in)
- Position: Winger

Team information
- Current team: Norwich City
- Number: 11

Youth career
- 2011–2022: Sheffield United

Senior career*
Years	Team	Apps	(Gls)
2022–2026	Sheffield United	82	(9)
2022	→ Bradford (Park Avenue) (loan)	7	(1)
2026–	Norwich City	5	(2)

International career^{‡}
2026–	Jamaica	1	(0)
- * Club domestic league appearances and goals as of 7 September 2026 (UTC) ‡ National team caps and goals as of 14:25, 27 March 2026 (UTC)

Andre Chance Brooks (born 20 August 2003) is a professional footballer who plays as a winger for EFL Championship club Norwich City. Born in England, he plays for the Jamaica national team.

== Career ==
=== Sheffield United ===
Born in Sheffield and educated at King Edward VII School, Brooks joined the youth academy of Sheffield United at the age of 8. He signed his first professional contract with the club on 21 May 2021 and was originally a part of their development side. On 6 August 2022, he joined Bradford (Park Avenue) on loan in the National League, where he had seven appearances and scored one goal. He returned to Sheffield United in September 2022. He made his professional debut as a late substitute in a 5–2 EFL Championship win over Burnley on 5 November 2022.

=== Norwich City ===
On 25 June 2026, Brooks signed for EFL Championship side Norwich City on a five-year deal for an undisclosed transfer fee. He scored his first goal for Norwich in a 4–1 victory over MK Dons in the first round of the Carabao Cup on 8 August 2026.

== International career ==
Born in England, Brooks has dual British-Jamaican citizenship. He was called up to the Jamaica national team for a 2026 FIFA World Cup qualification match in March 2026.

== Career statistics ==
=== Club ===
As of match played 1 September 2026

Appearances and goals by club, season and competition
Club	Season	League			FA Cup		League Cup		Other		Total	
Club	Season	Division	Apps	Goals	Apps	Goals	Apps	Goals	Apps	Goals	Apps	Goals
Bradford	2022–23	National League North	7	1	0	0	0	0	—		7	1
Sheffield United	2022–23	EFL Championship	1	0	0	0	0	0	—		1	0
Sheffield United	2023–24	Premier League	20	0	2	0	1	0	—		23	0
Sheffield United	2024–25	EFL Championship	22	3	1	0	2	0	3 (Note: Appearances in EFL Championship play-offs)	1	28	4
Sheffield United	2025–26	EFL Championship	39	6	1	0	1	0	—		41	6
Sheffield United	Total		82	9	4	0	4	0	3	1	93	10
Norwich City	2026–27	EFL Championship	4	2	0	0	2	1	—		6	3
Career total			93	12	4	0	6	1	3	1	106	14

=== International ===
As of match played 26 March 2026

Appearances and goals by national team and year
National team	Year	Apps	Goals
Jamaica	2026	1	0
Total		1	0
