= Dovydas Sasnauskas =

Lithuanian footballer (born 2007)

Personal information
- Full name: Dovydas Sasnauskas
- Date of birth: 16 February 2007 (age 19)
- Place of birth: London, England
- Position: Defender

Team information
- Current team: Sheffield United

Youth career
- –2023: Chelsea
- 2023–: Sheffield United

Senior career*
Years	Team	Apps	(Gls)
2024–	Sheffield United	0	(0)
2024–2025	→ Buxton (loan)	4	(0)

International career^{‡}
2023	Lithuania U16	5	(0)
2023	Lithuania U17	3	(0)
2024–2025	Lithuania U18	1	(0)
2024–2025	Lithuania U19	8	(1)
2025–	Lithuania U21	2	(0)
- * Club domestic league appearances and goals ‡ National team caps and goals as of 9 September 2025

Dovydas Sasnauskas (born 16 February 2007) is an Lithuanian footballer who plays as a defender for EFL Championship club Sheffield United. Born in England to Lithuanian parents. He plays for the Lithuania at youth level.

== Club career ==
Sasnauskas started his career with Chelsea's youth development squad before signing for Sheffield United's youth development squad in 2023. He signed his first senior professional contract in July 2024. Later in 2024, he joined Buxton on loan in the National League North where he made four appearances for the Bucks. He was recalled from his loan spell in January 2025 due to injuries at his parent club.

In July 2025, Sasnauskas signed a new long-term contract with the Blades. Sasnauskas made his senior debut for Sheffield United on 14 August 2025 starting in 2–1 defeat to Birmingham City in the League Cup. An error from Sasnauskas led to Birmingham City scoring the opening goal in the defeat at St Andrew's Stadium.

== Style of play ==
Sasnauskas plays as a centre-half.

== Personal life ==
Sasnauskas was born in England to Lithuanian parents and he speaks Lithuanian.

== Career statistics ==
Appearances and goals by club, season and competition
Club	Season	League			FA Cup		League Cup		Other		Total	
Club	Season	Division	Apps	Goals	Apps	Goals	Apps	Goals	Apps	Goals	Apps	Goals
Buxton (loan)	2024–25	NL North	4	0	0	0	0	0	0	0	4	0
Sheffield United	2025–26	EFL Championship	0	0	0	0	1	0	0	0	1	0
Career total			4	0	0	0	1	0	0	0	5	0

== Honours ==
Estonia U19

- U19 Baltic Cup runner-up: 2025
