= Ehije Ukaki =

Nigerian footballer (born 2004)

Personal information
- Full name: Ehije Success Ukaki
- Date of birth: 2 October 2004 (age 22)
- Place of birth: Ubaja, Nigeria
- Height: 1.77 m (5 ft 9 1/2 in)
- Position: Winger

Team information
- Current team: Botev Plovdiv (on loan from Sheffield United)
- Number: 44

Youth career
- 2022–2024: FDC Vista

Senior career*
Years	Team	Apps	(Gls)
2024–2025	Botev Plovdiv	47	(7)
2025–	Sheffield United	0	(0)
2026	→ Atromitos (loan)	16	(1)
2026–	→ Botev Plovdiv (loan)	0	(0)
- * Club domestic league appearances and goals as of 00:07, 24 August 2026 (UTC)

Ehije Ukaki (born 2 October 2004) is a Nigerian professional footballer who plays as a winger for Bulgarian First League club Botev Plovdiv, on loan from Sheffield United.

== Club career ==
On 19 January 2024, Ukaki signed a contract with Botev Plovdiv, coming from Vista Academy. On 30 July 2024 he scored his first league goal.

On 11 June 2025, Ukaki signed for English EFL Championship club Sheffield United for an undisclosed fee, signing a three-year contract. In September 2026, he returned to Botev Plovdiv for the remainder of the season.

== Career statistics ==
As of end of 2024–25 season

Appearances and goals by club, season and competition
Club	Season	League			National Cup		League Cup		Other		Total	
Club	Season	Division	Apps	Goals	Apps	Goals	Apps	Goals	Apps	Goals	Apps	Goals
Botev Plovdiv	2023–24	First League	13	0	4	0	―		―		17	0
Botev Plovdiv	2024–25	First League	34	7	2	0	―		5 (Note: Two appearances in UEFA Europa League, two appearances in UEFA Conference League and one appearance in Bulgarian Supercup)	0	41	7
Total			47	7	6	0	0	0	5	0	58	7
Sheffield United	2025–26	EFL Championship	0	0	0	0	1	0	―		1	0
Career total			47	7	6	0	1	0	5	0	59	7

== Honours ==
Botev Plovdiv

- Bulgarian Cup
  - Winner: 2023–24
