= Jefferson Cáceres =

Peruvian footballer (born 2002)

Personal information
- Full name: Jefferson Justo Cáceres Chávez
- Date of birth: 22 August 2002 (age 24)
- Place of birth: Lima, Peru
- Height: 1.70 m (5 ft 7 in)
- Position: Winger

Team information
- Current team: Melgar
- Number: 16

Youth career
- –2018: Esther Grande
- 2019–2020: Melgar

Senior career*
Years	Team	Apps	(Gls)
2020–2024	Melgar	36	(8)
2023	→ Binacional (loan)	21	(4)
2025	Sheffield United	0	(0)
2025–2026	Dunfermline Athletic	13	(0)
2026–	Melgar	1	(0)

International career^{‡}
2023	Peru U23	1	(0)
- * Club domestic league appearances and goals as of 15 March 2026 ‡ National team caps and goals as of 12 December 2023

Jefferson Justo Cáceres Chávez (born 22 August 2002) is a Peruvian professional footballer who plays as a winger for Liga 1 club Melgar.

== Club career ==
Nicknamed La Bala, Cáceres joined the youth academy of Peruvian side Esther Grande. In 2019, he joined the youth academy of Peruvian side Melgar and was promoted to the club's senior team in 2020. While playing for them, he played in the Copa Sudamericana.

Ahead of the 2023 season, he was sent on loan to Peruvian side Binacional until 2024, where he returned to Melgar. Subsequently, he signed for English side Sheffield United on 3 February 2025. However, Cáceres did not make any appearances for them before signing a two-year contract with Dunfermline Athletic on 15 August 2025.

== Career statistics ==
=== Club ===
As of match played 15 March 2026.

Club	Division	Season	League		Cup		Continental		Total	
Club	Division	Season	Apps	Goals	Apps	Goals	Apps	Goals	Apps	Goals
Melgar	Liga 1	2020	0	0	—		0	0	0	0
Melgar	Liga 1	2021	8	0	1	0	2	0	11	0
Melgar	Liga 1	2022	4	0	—		0	0	4	0
Melgar	Liga 1	2024	24	8	—		0	0	24	8
Melgar	Liga 1	2026	1	0	—		0	0	1	0
Melgar	Total		37	8	1	0	2	0	40	8
Binacional	Liga 1	2023	21	4	—		1	0	22	4
Sheffield United	EFL Championship	2024-25	0	0	—		—		0	0
Dunfermline Athletic	Scottish Championship	2025-26	13	0	1	0	—		14	0
Career total			71	12	2	0	3	0	76	12

== Style of play ==
Cáceres plays as a winger and is right-footed. Besides winger, he can play as a midfielder or as a forward.

== Honours ==
FBC Melgar

- Torneo Apertura 2022
