= 2023–24 Sheffield United F.C. season =

135th season in existence of Sheffield United FC

Sheffield United
2023–24 season
- Chairman: Yusuf Giansiracusa
- Manager: Paul Heckingbottom (until 5 December); Chris Wilder (from 5 December)
- Stadium: Bramall Lane
- Premier League: 20th (relegated)
- FA Cup: Fourth round
- EFL Cup: Second round
- Top goalscorer: League: Ben Brereton Díaz; Oli McBurnie (6 each); All: Ben Brereton Díaz; Oli McBurnie (6 each)
- Highest home attendance: 31,543 (vs Manchester United, 21 October 2023)
- Lowest home attendance: 11,040 (vs Lincoln City, 30 August 2023)
- Average home league attendance: 30,011
- Biggest win: 4–0 vs Gillingham (away) (6 January 2024)
- Biggest defeat: 0–8 vs Newcastle United (home) (24 September 2023)
| Home colours | Away colours | Third colours |

The 2023–24 season was the 135th season in the history of Sheffield United and their first season in the Premier League since the 2020–21 season following their promotion from the Championship in the previous season. The club also participated in the FA Cup and the EFL Cup.

Following a 4–2 loss to Manchester United on 24 April, Sheffield United broke the record of 89 goals conceded in a 38-game Premier League season set by Derby County in the 2007–08 season. Three days later, the club were officially relegated back to the Championship following a 5–1 defeat away to Newcastle United. This defeat left the Blades on 16 points, 10 fewer than 17th-placed Nottingham Forest with only three matches remaining.

On 4 May, following a 3–1 home defeat against Nottingham Forest, the club equaled Swindon Town's record of most goals conceded in the Premier League in 1993–94, with 100. A week later, on 11 May, they surpassed the previous record with a 1–0 away defeat against Everton. Furthermore, they became the first Premier League club to lose at least one match against all 19 of their opponents in a single season; Wolverhampton Wanderers later became the second club to do so during the 2025–26 season.

On the final matchday of the season, Sheffield United suffered a 3–0 home defeat to Tottenham Hotspur, setting a new record of 104 goals conceded. This also resulted in a goal difference of –69, matching Derby County's negative record from the aforementioned 2007–08 season. Additionally, they set new records for goals conceded at home with 57, surpassing Aston Villa's record from the 1935–36 season, and recorded a home goal difference of –38.

== Squad ==
As of 18 February 2024

| No. | Player | Position | Nat. | Place of birth | Date of birth (age) | Previous club | Date signed | Fee | Contract end |
Goalkeepers
| 1 | Adam Davies | GK | (Wales) | (Germany) Rinteln | 17 July 1992 (age 34) | (England) Stoke City | 25 January 2022 | £300,000 | 30 June 2024 |
| 13 | Ivo Grbić | GK | (Croatia) | Split | 18 January 1996 (age 30) | (Spain) Atlético Madrid | 26 January 2024 | Undisclosed | 30 June 2027 |
| 18 | Wes Foderingham | GK | (England) | Hammersmith | 14 January 1991 (age 35) | (Scotland) Rangers | 27 July 2020 | Free | 30 June 2024 |
| 37 | Jordan Amissah | GK | (Germany) | Herne | 2 August 2001 (age 25) | (Germany) Borussia Dortmund | 4 July 2018 | Free | 30 June 2024 |
Defenders
| 2 | George Baldock | RB | (Greece) | (England) Buckingham | 9 March 1993 (age 33) | (England) Milton Keynes Dons | 1 July 2017 | £740,000 | 30 June 2024 |
| 3 | Max Lowe | LB | (England) | South Normanton | 11 May 1997 (age 29) | (England) Derby County | 7 September 2020 | £3,850,000 | 30 June 2024 |
| 5 | Auston Trusty | CB | (United States) | Media | 12 August 1998 (age 28) | (England) Arsenal | 3 August 2023 | £5,000,000 | 30 June 2027 |
| 6 | Chris Basham | CB | (England) | Hebburn | 20 July 1988 (age 38) | (England) Blackpool | 1 July 2014 | Free | 30 June 2024 |
| 12 | John Egan | CB | (Republic of Ireland) | Cork | 20 October 1992 (age 34) | (England) Brentford | 19 July 2018 | £4,500,000 | 30 June 2024 |
| 15 | Anel Ahmedhodžić | CB | (Bosnia and Herzegovina) | (Sweden) Malmö | 26 March 1999 (age 27) | (Sweden) Malmö FF | 6 July 2022 | £4,500,000 | 30 June 2026 |
| 19 | Jack Robinson | LB | (England) | Warrington | 1 September 1993 (age 33) | (England) Nottingham Forest | 21 January 2020 | Undisclosed | 30 June 2025 |
| 20 | Jayden Bogle | RB | (England) | Reading | 27 July 2000 (age 26) | (England) Derby County | 7 September 2020 | £3,850,000 | 30 June 2024 |
| 27 | Yasser Larouci | LB | (Algeria) | El Oued | 1 January 2001 (age 25) | (France) Troyes | 17 July 2023 | Loan | 31 May 2024 |
| 29 | Sam Curtis | RB | (Republic of Ireland) | Navan | 1 December 2005 (age 20) | (Republic of Ireland) St Patrick's Athletic | 25 January 2024 | Undisclosed | 30 June 2027 |
| 30 | Mason Holgate | CB | (England) | Doncaster | 22 October 1996 (age 30) | (England) Everton | 1 February 2024 | Loan | 31 May 2024 |
| 33 | Rhys Norrington-Davies | LB | (Wales) | (Saudi Arabia) Riyadh | 22 April 1999 (age 27) | (Wales) Swansea City | 1 July 2017 | Undisclosed | 30 June 2024 |
Midfielders
| 8 | Gustavo Hamer | CM | (Netherlands) | (Brazil) Itajai | 24 June 1997 (age 29) | (England) Coventry City | 12 August 2023 | Undisclosed | 30 June 2027 |
| 16 | Oliver Norwood | CM | (Northern Ireland) | (England) Burnley | 12 April 1991 (age 35) | (England) Brighton & Hove Albion | 4 January 2019 | £2,000,000 | 30 June 2024 |
| 21 | Vinícius Souza | DM | (Brazil) | Rio de Janeiro | 17 June 1999 (age 27) | (Belgium) Lommel | 9 August 2023 | £10,300,000 | 30 June 2027 |
| 22 | Tom Davies | CM | (England) | Liverpool | 30 June 1998 (age 28) | (England) Everton | 16 August 2023 | Free | 30 June 2026 |
| 23 | Ben Osborn | LM | (England) | Derby | 5 August 1994 (age 32) | (England) Nottingham Forest | 26 July 2019 | £3,500,000 | 30 June 2024 |
| 24 | Ollie Arblaster | CM | (England) | Sheffield | 5 May 2004 (age 22) | Academy | 1 July 2021 | Trainee | 30 June 2024 |
| 25 | Anis Ben Slimane | CM | (Tunisia) | (Denmark) Copenhagen | 16 March 2001 (age 25) | (Denmark) Brøndby | 13 July 2023 | Undisclosed | 30 June 2026 |
| 28 | James McAtee | CM | (England) | Salford | 18 October 2002 (age 24) | (England) Manchester City | 1 September 2023 | Loan | 31 May 2024 |
| 35 | Andre Brooks | LM | (England) | Sheffield | 20 August 2003 (age 23) | Academy | 1 July 2021 | Trainee | 30 June 2027 |
| 43 | Evan Easton | DM | (Scotland) | | 14 January 2005 (age 21) | (Scotland) Celtic | 11 September 2023 | Free | 30 June 2025 |
Forwards
| 7 | Rhian Brewster | CF | (England) | Chadwell Heath | 1 April 2000 (age 26) | (England) Liverpool | 2 October 2020 | £26,000,000 | 30 June 2025 |
| 9 | Oliver McBurnie | CF | (Scotland) | (England) Leeds | 4 June 1996 (age 30) | (Wales) Swansea City | 2 August 2019 | £17,500,000 | 30 June 2024 |
| 10 | Cameron Archer | CF | (England) | Walsall | 9 December 2001 (age 24) | (England) Aston Villa | 27 August 2023 | £18,500,000 | 30 June 2027 |
| 11 | Ben Brereton Díaz | LW | (Chile) | (England) Stoke-on-Trent | 18 April 1999 (age 27) | (Spain) Villarreal | 5 January 2024 | Loan | 31 May 2024 |
| 32 | William Osula | CF | (Denmark) | Aarhus | 4 August 2003 (age 23) | Academy | 1 July 2021 | Trainee | 30 June 2027 |
| 34 | Louie Marsh | SS | (England) | Sheffield | 16 October 2003 (age 23) | Academy | 1 July 2022 | Trainee | 30 June 2026 |
| 36 | Daniel Jebbison | CF | (England) | (Canada) Oakville | 11 July 2003 (age 23) | Academy | 1 July 2021 | Trainee | 30 June 2024 |
| 45 | Billy Blacker | LW | (England) | | 25 May 2006 (age 20) | Academy | 18 February 2024 | Trainee | 30 June 2024 |
Out on Loan
| 11 | Bénie Traoré | CF | (Ivory Coast) | Ouragahio | 30 November 2002 (age 23) | (Sweden) BK Häcken | 18 July 2023 | Undisclosed | 30 June 2027 |
| 17 | Ismaila Coulibaly | CM | (Mali) | | 25 December 2000 (age 25) | (Norway) Sarpsborg 08 | 8 September 2020 | £1,750,000 | 30 June 2024 |
| 38 | Femi Seriki | RB | (England) | Manchester | 28 April 2002 (age 24) | (England) Bury | 24 September 2019 | Undisclosed | 30 June 2027 |
| 39 | Antwoine Hackford | CF | (England) | Arbourthorne | 20 March 2004 (age 22) | Academy | 1 July 2021 | Trainee | 30 June 2026 |
| 40 | Jili Buyabu | LB | (England) | Enfield | 9 August 2003 (age 23) | (England) Hornchurch | 21 December 2021 | Undisclosed | 30 June 2024 |
| —N/a | Sai Sachdev | RB | (England) | Leicester | 23 October 2004 (age 22) | Academy | 1 July 2022 | Trainee | 30 June 2024 |

== Squad statistics ==
=== Appearances and goals ===
Updated 19 May 2024

| No. | Pos | Nat | Player | Total | | Premier League | | FA Cup | | EFL Cup | |
| No. | Pos | Nat | Player | Apps | Goals | Apps | Goals | Apps | Goals | Apps | Goals |
Goalkeepers
| 1 | GK | (Wales) WAL | Adam Davies | 1 | 0 | 0 | 0 | 0 | 0 | 1 | 0 |
| 13 | GK | (Croatia) CRO | Ivo Grbić | 10 | 0 | 9 | 0 | 1 | 0 | 0 | 0 |
| 18 | GK | (England) ENG | Wes Foderingham | 31 | 0 | 29+1 | 0 | 1 | 0 | 0 | 0 |
| 37 | GK | (Germany) GER | Jordan Amissah | 0 | 0 | 0 | 0 | 0 | 0 | 0 | 0 |
Defenders
| 2 | DF | (Greece) GRE | George Baldock | 13 | 0 | 11+2 | 0 | 0 | 0 | 0 | 0 |
| 3 | DF | (England) ENG | Max Lowe | 10 | 0 | 4+6 | 0 | 0 | 0 | 0 | 0 |
| 5 | DF | (United States) USA | Auston Trusty | 36 | 0 | 30+4 | 0 | 1 | 0 | 1 | 0 |
| 6 | DF | (England) ENG | Chris Basham | 9 | 0 | 3+5 | 0 | 0 | 0 | 1 | 0 |
| 12 | DF | (Republic of Ireland) IRL | John Egan | 7 | 0 | 6 | 0 | 0 | 0 | 1 | 0 |
| 15 | DF | (Bosnia and Herzegovina) BIH | Anel Ahmedhodžić | 32 | 2 | 29+2 | 2 | 1 | 0 | 0 | 0 |
| 19 | DF | (England) ENG | Jack Robinson | 35 | 1 | 32+2 | 1 | 1 | 0 | 0 | 0 |
| 20 | DF | (England) ENG | Jayden Bogle | 36 | 3 | 32+2 | 3 | 1 | 0 | 1 | 0 |
| 27 | DF | (France) FRA | Yasser Larouci | 12 | 0 | 5+5 | 0 | 0+1 | 0 | 1 | 0 |
| 29 | DF | (Republic of Ireland) IRL | Sam Curtis | 1 | 0 | 0+1 | 0 | 0 | 0 | 0 | 0 |
| 30 | DF | (England) ENG | Mason Holgate | 10 | 0 | 9+1 | 0 | 0 | 0 | 0 | 0 |
| 33 | DF | (Wales) WAL | Rhys Norrington-Davies | 7 | 0 | 2+3 | 0 | 2 | 0 | 0 | 0 |
| 40 | DF | (England) ENG | Jili Buyabu | 1 | 0 | 0 | 0 | 0 | 0 | 0+1 | 0 |
Midfielders
| 8 | MF | (Netherlands) NED | Gustavo Hamer | 38 | 5 | 34+2 | 4 | 2 | 1 | 0 | 0 |
| 16 | MF | (Northern Ireland) NIR | Oliver Norwood | 30 | 1 | 16+11 | 1 | 2 | 0 | 1 | 0 |
| 21 | MF | (Brazil) BRA | Vinícius Souza | 38 | 1 | 29+7 | 1 | 0+2 | 0 | 0 | 0 |
| 22 | MF | (England) ENG | Tom Davies | 9 | 0 | 2+7 | 0 | 0 | 0 | 0 | 0 |
| 23 | MF | (England) ENG | Ben Osborn | 26 | 0 | 14+10 | 0 | 1+1 | 0 | 0 | 0 |
| 25 | MF | (Tunisia) TUN | Anis Slimane | 15 | 0 | 4+11 | 0 | 0 | 0 | 0 | 0 |
| 28 | MF | (England) ENG | James McAtee | 32 | 5 | 20+10 | 3 | 1+1 | 2 | 0 | 0 |
| 24 | MF | (England) ENG | Oliver Arblaster | 12 | 0 | 11+1 | 0 | 0 | 0 | 0 | 0 |
| 35 | MF | (England) ENG | Andre Brooks | 23 | 0 | 12+8 | 0 | 1+1 | 0 | 1 | 0 |
| 42 | MF | (England) ENG | Sydie Peck | 1 | 0 | 0+1 | 0 | 0 | 0 | 0 | 0 |
Forwards
| 7 | FW | (England) ENG | Rhian Brewster | 14 | 0 | 3+10 | 0 | 0+1 | 0 | 0 | 0 |
| 9 | FW | (Scotland) SCO | Oli McBurnie | 23 | 6 | 15+6 | 6 | 0+1 | 0 | 1 | 0 |
| 10 | FW | (England) ENG | Cameron Archer | 32 | 4 | 21+8 | 4 | 2 | 0 | 1 | 0 |
| 11 | FW | (Chile) CHI | Ben Brereton Díaz | 16 | 6 | 14 | 6 | 1+1 | 0 | 0 | 0 |
| 32 | FW | (Denmark) DEN | William Osula | 24 | 3 | 9+12 | 0 | 2 | 3 | 0+1 | 0 |
| 36 | FW | (Canada) CAN | Daniel Jebbison | 1 | 0 | 0+1 | 0 | 0 | 0 | 0 | 0 |
| 39 | FW | (England) ENG | Antwoine Hackford | 2 | 0 | 0+2 | 0 | 0 | 0 | 0 | 0 |
Player(s) out on loan:
| 11 | FW | (Ivory Coast) CIV | Bénie Traoré | 8 | 0 | 3+4 | 0 | 0 | 0 | 0+1 | 0 |
| 17 | MF | (Mali) MLI | Ismaila Coulibaly | 1 | 0 | 0 | 0 | 0 | 0 | 1 | 0 |
| 34 | FW | (England) ENG | Louie Marsh | 1 | 0 | 0 | 0 | 0 | 0 | 0+1 | 0 |
| 39 | DF | (England) ENG | Sai Sachdev | 0 | 0 | 0 | 0 | 0 | 0 | 0 | 0 |
Players who left the club:
| 4 | MF | (Scotland) SCO | John Fleck | 4 | 0 | 1+3 | 0 | 0 | 0 | 0 | 0 |
| 14 | DF | (England) ENG | Luke Thomas | 13 | 0 | 11+1 | 0 | 1 | 0 | 0 | 0 |

==== Goals ====
As of 4 May 2024

| Rank | No. | Nat. | Pos. | Player | Premier League | FA Cup | EFL Cup | Total |
|---|---|---|---|---|---|---|---|---|
| 1 | 9 | (Scotland) | FW | Oli McBurnie | 6 | 0 | 0 | 6 |
| 1 | 11 | (Chile) | FW | Ben Brereton Díaz | 6 | 0 | 0 | 6 |
| 2 | 8 | (Netherlands) | MF | Gustavo Hamer | 4 | 1 | 0 | 5 |
| 2 | 28 | (England) | MF | James McAtee | 3 | 2 | 0 | 5 |
| 3 | 10 | (England) | FW | Cameron Archer | 4 | 0 | 0 | 4 |
| 4 | 20 | (England) | DF | Jayden Bogle | 3 | 0 | 0 | 3 |
| 4 | 32 | (Denmark) | FW | William Osula | 0 | 3 | 0 | 3 |
| 5 | 15 | (Bosnia and Herzegovina) | DF | Anel Ahmedhodžić | 2 | 0 | 0 | 2 |
| 6 | 16 | (Northern Ireland) | MF | Oliver Norwood | 1 | 0 | 0 | 1 |
| 6 | 21 | (Brazil) | MF | Vinícius Souza | 1 | 0 | 0 | 1 |
| 6 | 19 | (England) | DF | Jack Robinson | 1 | 0 | 0 | 1 |
| Own goals | | | | | 4 | 0 | 0 | 4 |
| Totals | | | | | 35 | 6 | 0 | 41 |

== Transfers ==
=== In ===
| Date | Pos. | Player | Transferred from | Fee | Ref. |
|---|---|---|---|---|---|
| 13 July 2023 | CM | (Tunisia) Anis Slimane | (Denmark) Brøndby | Undisclosed | |
| 18 July 2023 | CF | (Ivory Coast) Bénie Traoré | (Sweden) BK Häcken | Undisclosed | |
| 3 August 2023 | CB | (United States) Auston Trusty | (England) Arsenal | Undisclosed | |
| 9 August 2023 | DM | (Brazil) Vinícius Souza | (Belgium) Lommel | Undisclosed | |
| 12 August 2023 | CM | (Netherlands) Gustavo Hamer | (England) Coventry City | Undisclosed | |
| 16 August 2023 | CM | (England) Tom Davies | (England) Everton | Free transfer | |
| 27 August 2023 | CF | (England) Cameron Archer | (England) Aston Villa | Undisclosed | |
| 2 September 2023 | CF | (Scotland) Ryan Oné † | (Scotland) Hamilton Academical | Undisclosed | |
| 11 September 2023 | DM | (Scotland) Evan Easton † | (Scotland) Celtic | Free transfer | |
| 11 September 2023 | CM | (England) Jay Tinsdale † | (England) Bradford City | Free transfer | |
| 25 January 2024 | RB | (Republic of Ireland) Sam Curtis | (Republic of Ireland) St Patrick's Athletic | Undisclosed | |
| 26 January 2024 | GK | (Croatia) Ivo Grbić | (Spain) Atlético Madrid | Undisclosed | |

† Signed initially for the development squad

=== Out ===
| Date | Pos. | Player | Transferred to | Fee | Ref. |
|---|---|---|---|---|---|
| 14 June 2023 | CM | (England) George Broadbent | (England) Doncaster Rovers | Undisclosed | |
| 30 June 2023 | LB | (England) Tom Angell | (England) Basford United | Released | |
| 30 June 2023 | AM | (Tunisia) Hassan Ayari | Free agent | Released | |
| 30 June 2023 | CB | (France) Jean Belehouan | Free agent | Released | |
| 30 June 2023 | CB | (England) Kyron Gordon | Free agent | Released | |
| 30 June 2023 | GK | (England) Henry Hampshaw | (England) Stocksbridge Park Steels | Released | |
| 30 June 2023 | GK | (England) Callum Hiddleston | Free agent | Released | |
| 30 June 2023 | CB | (England) Jack O'Connell | Retired | Retired | |
| 30 June 2023 | CF | (England) Johnny Oluleye | Free agent | Released | |
| 30 June 2023 | CF | (England) Billy Sharp | (United States) LA Galaxy | Released | |
| 30 June 2023 | CB | (England) Joe Starbuck | Free agent | Released | |
| 30 June 2023 | LB | (Republic of Ireland) Enda Stevens | (England) Stoke City | Released | |
| 30 June 2023 | CB | (England) Luther Williams | Free agent | Released | |
| 2 July 2023 | RM | (England) Theo Williams | (England) Fleetwood Town | Free transfer | |
| 4 July 2023 | GK | (England) Jake Eastwood | (England) Grimsby Town | Undisclosed | |
| 4 July 2023 | CM | (England) Zak Brunt | (England) Barnet | Undisclosed | |
| 1 August 2023 | CF | (Senegal) Iliman Ndiaye | (France) Marseille | Undisclosed | |
| 9 August 2023 | DM | (Norway) Sander Berge | (England) Burnley | Undisclosed | |
| 17 November 2023 | GK | (England) Marcus Dewhurst | (England) Wealdstone | Free Transfer | |
| 4 January 2024 | CM | (England) Harrison Neal | (England) Carlisle United | Undisclosed | |
| 1 February 2024 | CM | (Scotland) John Fleck | (England) Blackburn Rovers | Free Transfer | |
| 1 February 2024 | CB | (England) Finley Potter | (England) Fleetwood Town | Undisclosed | |
| 23 February 2024 | CB | (France) Nicksoen Gomis | (United States) Toronto | Undisclosed | |

=== Loaned in ===
| Date | Pos. | Player | Loaned from | Until | Ref. |
|---|---|---|---|---|---|
| 17 July 2023 | LB | (France) Yasser Larouci | (France) Troyes | End of season | |
| 31 August 2023 | LB | (England) Luke Thomas | (England) Leicester City | 12 January 2024 (Note: On 12 January, Thomas returned to Leicester early from his season-long loan.) | |
| 1 September 2023 | CM | (England) James McAtee | (England) Manchester City | End of season | |
| 5 January 2024 | LW | (Chile) Ben Brereton Díaz | (Spain) Villarreal | End of season | |
| 1 February 2024 | CB | (England) Mason Holgate | (England) Everton | End of season | |

=== Loaned out ===
| Date | Pos. | Player | Loaned to | Until | Ref. |
|---|---|---|---|---|---|
| 13 July 2023 | LB | (England) Harry Boyes | (England) Wycombe Wanderers | 12 January 2024 (Note: On 12 January, Boyes returned early from his loan at Wycombe.) | |
| 17 July 2023 | CM | (England) Oliver Arblaster | (England) Port Vale | 29 December 2023 (Note: On 29 December, Arblaster was recalled early from his loan at Port Vale.) | |
| 17 July 2023 | CB | (England) Finley Potter | (England) Barnet | 1 February 2024 (Note: On 1 February, Potter was recalled early from his loan at Barnet and subsequently signed for Fleetwood.) | |
| 17 July 2023 | GK | (England) Dylan Wharton | (England) Gainsborough Trinity | End of season | |
| 14 August 2023 | CM | (England) Harrison Neal | (England) Stevenage | 3 January 2024 (Note: On 3 January, Neal returned early from his season-long loan at Stevenage.) | |
| 18 August 2023 | CM | (England) Frankie Maguire | (England) Chester | 2 January 2024 | |
| 1 September 2023 | SS | (England) Louie Marsh | (England) Doncaster Rovers | 10 January 2024 (Note: On 10 January, Marsh returned early from his season-long loan at Doncaster.) | |
| 4 January 2024 | CF | (Ivory Coast) Bénie Traoré | (France) Nantes | End of season | |
| 12 January 2024 | LB | (England) Harry Boyes | (England) Fleetwood Town | End of Season | |
| 15 January 2024 | RB | (England) Sai Sachdev | (England) Oldham Athletic | End of Season | |
| 18 January 2024 | CM | (England) Frankie Maguire | (England) Chorley | End of season | |
| 1 February 2024 | LB | (England) Jili Buyabu | (Scotland) Motherwell | End of Season | |
| 1 February 2024 | CF | (England) Antwoine Hackford | (England) Burton Albion | End of season | |
| 1 February 2024 | RB | (England) Femi Seriki | (England) Rotherham United | End of Season | |
| 2 February 2024 | CM | (Mali) Ismaila Coulibaly | (Sweden) AIK | End of season | |

== Pre-season and friendlies ==
On 1 June, Sheffield United announced three pre-season friendlies, against Chesterfield, Rotherham United and Derby County along with a training camp in Europe. A home friendly against VfB Stuttgart was later confirmed. Also revealed was a behind-closed-doors fixture versus Girona. On 7 July, a sixth and final friendly was announced, against Estoril.

Win Draw Loss Fixtures

| 15 July 2023 Friendly | Chesterfield | 0–2 | Sheffield United | Chesterfield |
| 15:00 BST | | Report | Ndiaye 52'; Osborn 59' | Stadium: Technique Stadium; Attendance: 9,476 |

| 19 July 2023 Friendly | Estoril | 0–0 | Sheffield United | Alcabideche, Portugal |
| 19:30 WEST; 19:30 BST | | Report | | Stadium: Estádio António Coimbra da Mota |

| 25 July 2023 Friendly | Rotherham United | 1–0 | Sheffield United | Rotherham |
| 19:00 BST | Trialist 12' | Report | | Stadium: AESSEAL New York Stadium |

| 26 July 2023 Friendly | Sheffield United | 0–2 | Girona | Manchester |
| 13:00 BST | | Report | Sávio 74'; Torre 90+3' | Stadium: Academy Stadium; Attendance: 0 |

| 29 July 2023 Friendly | Derby County | 1–3 | Sheffield United | Derby |
| 15:00 BST | Smith 58' | Report | Ben Slimane 18'; Baldock 82'; Ndiaye 84' | Stadium: Pride Park Stadium |

| 5 August 2023 Friendly | Sheffield United | 0–3 | VfB Stuttgart | Sheffield |
| 13:00 BST | | Report | Guirassy 9', 14', 59' | Stadium: Bramall Lane; Attendance: 10,732 |

== Competitions ==
=== Overall record ===
| Competition | First match | Last match | Starting round | Final position | Record | | | | | | | |
| Competition | First match | Last match | Starting round | Final position | Pld | W | D | L | GF | GA | GD | Win % |
|---|---|---|---|---|---|---|---|---|---|---|---|---|
| Premier League | 12 August 2023 | 19 May 2024 | Matchday 1 | 20th | 38 | 3 | 7 | 28 | 35 | 104 | −69 | 7.89 |
| FA Cup | 6 January 2024 | 27 January 2024 | Third round | Fourth round | 2 | 1 | 0 | 1 | 6 | 5 | +1 | 50.00 |
| EFL Cup | 30 August 2023 | | Second round | Second round | 1 | 0 | 1 | 0 | 0 | 0 | +0 | 0.00 |
| Total | | | | | 41 | 4 | 8 | 29 | 41 | 109 | −68 | 9.76 |

Source: Soccerway

=== Premier League ===
==== League table ====
| Pos | Team | Pld | W | D | L | GF | GA | GD | Pts | Qualification or relegation |
|---|---|---|---|---|---|---|---|---|---|---|
| 16 | Brentford | 38 | 10 | 9 | 19 | 56 | 65 | −9 | 39 | |
| 17 | Nottingham Forest | 38 | 9 | 9 | 20 | 49 | 67 | −18 | 32 (Note: Nottingham Forest were deducted four points for breaching profitability and sustainability rules. The club appealed the decision but were unsuccessful.) | |
| 18 | Luton Town (R) | 38 | 6 | 8 | 24 | 52 | 85 | −33 | 26 | Relegation to EFL Championship |
| 19 | Burnley (R) | 38 | 5 | 9 | 24 | 41 | 78 | −37 | 24 | Relegation to EFL Championship |
| 20 | Sheffield United (R) | 38 | 3 | 7 | 28 | 35 | 104 | −69 | 16 | Relegation to EFL Championship |

Source: Premier League
Rules for classification: 1) Points; 2) Goal difference; 3) Goals scored; 4) If the champions, relegated teams or qualified teams for UEFA competitions cannot be determined by rules 1 to 3, rules 4.1 to 4.3 are applied – 4.1) Points gained in head-to-head record between such teams; 4.2) Away goals scored in head-to-head record between such teams; 4.3) Play-offs
(R) Relegated

==== Results summary ====
| Overall | | | | | | | | Home | | | | | | Away | | | | | |
| Pld | W | D | L | GF | GA | GD | Pts | W | D | L | GF | GA | GD | W | D | L | GF | GA | GD |
|---|---|---|---|---|---|---|---|---|---|---|---|---|---|---|---|---|---|---|---|
| 38 | 3 | 7 | 28 | 35 | 104 | −69 | 16 | 2 | 4 | 13 | 19 | 57 | −38 | 1 | 3 | 15 | 16 | 47 | −31 |

Source: Soccerway

==== Results by round ====
| Round | 1 | 2 | 3 | 4 | 5 | 6 | 7 | 8 | 9 | 10 | 11 | 12 | 13 | 14 | 15 | 16 | 17 | 18 | 19 | 20 | 21 | 22 | 23 | 24 | 25 | 26 | 27 | 28 | 30 | 31 | 32 | 33 | 34 | 29^{2} | 35 | 36 | 37 | 38 |
|---|---|---|---|---|---|---|---|---|---|---|---|---|---|---|---|---|---|---|---|---|---|---|---|---|---|---|---|---|---|---|---|---|---|---|---|---|---|---|
| Ground | H | A | H | H | A | H | A | A | H | A | H | A | H | A | H | H | A | A | H | A | H | A | H | A | H | A | H | A | H | A | H | A | H | A | A | H | A | H |
| Result | L | L | L | D | L | L | L | L | L | L | W | D | L | L | L | W | L | D | L | L | D | L | L | W | L | L | L | D | D | L | D | L | L | L | L | L | L | L |
| Position | 16 | 16 | 17 | 17 | 17 | 20 | 20 | 20 | 20 | 20 | 20 | 18^{1} | 18 | 20 | 20 | 20 | 20 | 20 | 20 | 20 | 20 | 20 | 20 | 20 | 20 | 20 | 20 | 20 | 20 | 20 | 20 | 20 | 20 | 20 | 20 | 20 | 20 | 20 |
| Points | 0 | 0 | 0 | 1 | 1 | 1 | 1 | 1 | 1 | 1 | 4 | 5 | 5 | 5 | 5 | 8 | 8 | 9 | 9 | 9 | 10 | 10 | 10 | 13 | 13 | 13 | 13 | 14 | 15 | 15 | 16 | 16 | 16 | 16 | 16 | 16 | 16 | 16 |

Source: Soccerway
A = Away; H = Home; W = Win; D = Draw; L = Loss
Notes:
- ^{1} Sheffield United were originally 19th at the end of Matchday 12. On 17 November 2023, Everton were deducted 10 points, subsequently bringing Sheffield United up to 18th.
- ^{2} Matchday 29 (v. Manchester United) was postponed due to Manchester United's FA Cup involvements.

==== Matches ====
On 15 June, the Premier League fixtures were released.

Win Draw Loss Fixtures

| 12 August 2023 1 | Sheffield United | 0–1 | Crystal Palace | Sheffield |
| 15:00 BST | Osula (yellow card) 16'; Ahmedhodžić (yellow card) 57'; Ben Slimane (yellow card) 86' | Report | Édouard 49' | Stadium: Bramall Lane; Attendance: 31,194; Referee: John Brooks |

| 18 August 2023 2 | Nottingham Forest | 2–1 | Sheffield United | West Bridgford |
| 19:45 BST | Awoniyi 3'; Boly (yellow card) 36'; Aurier (yellow card) 44'; Wood 89' | Report | Norwood (yellow card) 45+2'; Hamer 48', (yellow card) 72'; Osborn (yellow card) 86' | Stadium: City Ground; Attendance: 29,432; Referee: Peter Bankes |

| 27 August 2023 3 | Sheffield United | 1–2 | Manchester City | Sheffield |
| 14:00 BST | Baldock (yellow card) 45+4'; Osula (yellow card) 59'; Vinícius (yellow card) 77'; Egan (yellow card) 83'; Bogle 85' | Report | Haaland (penalty missed) 37', 63'; Rodri 88' | Stadium: Bramall Lane; Attendance: 31,336; Referee: Jarred Gillett |

| 2 September 2023 4 | Sheffield United | 2–2 | Everton | Sheffield |
| 12:30 BST | Archer 33'; Pickford 45+3' (o.g.); Ahmedhodžić (yellow card) 49' | Report | Branthwaite (yellow card) 9'; Doucouré 14', (yellow card) 73'; Danjuma 55' | Stadium: Bramall Lane; Attendance: 31,124; Referee: Andrew Madley |

| 16 September 2023 5 | Tottenham Hotspur | 2–1 | Sheffield United | Tottenham |
| 15:00 BST | Van de Ven (yellow card) 49'; Maddison (yellow card) 63'; Solomon (yellow card) 69'; Bissouma (yellow card) 86'; Richarlison 90+8', (yellow card) 90+16'; Kulusevski 90+10'; Perišić (yellow card) 90+13' | Report | Basham (yellow card) 29'; Archer (yellow card) 41'; Foderingham (yellow card) 45'; McBurnie (yellow card) 56' (yellow-red card) 90+14'; Robinson (yellow card) 63'; Hamer 73'; Davies (yellow card) 90+2' | Stadium: Tottenham Hotspur Stadium; Attendance: 61,706; Referee: Peter Bankes |

| 24 September 2023 6 | Sheffield United | 0–8 | Newcastle United | Sheffield |
| 16:30 BST | Ahmedhodžić (yellow card) 28'; Robinson (yellow card) 34'; Ben Slimane (yellow card) 75'; Egan (yellow card) 90+4' | Report | Longstaff 21'; Burn 31'; Botman 35'; Wilson 56'; Gordon 61'; Almirón 68'; Bruno Guimarães 73'; Isak 87' | Stadium: Bramall Lane; Attendance: 30,568; Referee: Stuart Attwell |

| 30 September 2023 7 | West Ham United | 2–0 | Sheffield United | Stratford |
| 15:00 BST | Bowen 24'; Souček 37'; Álvarez (yellow card) 40' | Report | McAtee (yellow card) 32' | Stadium: London Stadium; Attendance: 62,459; Referee: Graham Scott |

| 7 October 2023 8 | Fulham | 3–1 | Sheffield United | Fulham |
| 15:00 BST | Palhinha (yellow card) 50'; Decordova-Reid 53'; Foderingham 76' (o.g.); Willian 90+2' | Report | Robinson 68' (o.g.); McBurnie (yellow card) 73'; Norwood (yellow card) 90+1' | Stadium: Craven Cottage; Attendance: 24,361; Referee: Sam Barrott |

| 21 October 2023 9 | Sheffield United | 1–2 | Manchester United | Sheffield |
| 20:00 BST | McBurnie 34' (pen.); Thomas (yellow card) 37'; Trusty (yellow card) 45'; Vinícius (yellow card) 62' | Report | McTominay 28'; Dalot 77'; Evans (yellow card) 82' | Stadium: Bramall Lane; Attendance: 31,543; Referee: Michael Oliver |

| 28 October 2023 10 | Arsenal | 5–0 | Sheffield United | Holloway |
| 15:00 BST | Nketiah 28', 50', 58'; Vieira 88' (pen.); Tomiyasu 90+6' | Report | Osborn (yellow card) 60'; Bogle (yellow card) 70'; Norwood (yellow card) 87' | Stadium: Emirates Stadium; Attendance: 60,153; Referee: Tim Robinson |

| 4 November 2023 11 | Sheffield United | 2–1 | Wolverhampton Wanderers | Sheffield |
| 15:00 GMT | Baldock (yellow card) 22'; Archer 72'; Hamer (yellow card) 89'; Norwood 90+10' (pen.) | Report | Dawson (yellow card) 49'; Doyle (yellow card) 58'; Silva (yellow card) 82'; Bellegarde 89' | Stadium: Bramall Lane; Attendance: 29,454; Referee: Robert Jones |

| 12 November 2023 12 | Brighton & Hove Albion | 1–1 | Sheffield United | Brighton and Hove |
| 14:00 GMT | Adingra 6', (yellow card) 66'; Buonanotte (yellow card) 45+3'; Dahoud (red card) 69'; Baleba (yellow card) 77' | Report | Bogle (yellow card) 45+2'; Webster 74' (o.g.); Robinson (yellow card) 88' | Stadium: Falmer Stadium; Attendance: 31,367; Referee: John Brooks |

| 25 November 2023 13 | Sheffield United | 1–3 | Bournemouth | Sheffield |
| 15:00 GMT | Norwood (yellow card) 22'; Thomas (yellow card) 51'; Baldock (yellow card) 69'; Robinson (yellow card) 70'; McBurnie 90+7' | Report | Tavernier 12', 51'; Kluivert 45+3'; Billing (yellow card) 70' | Stadium: Bramall Lane; Attendance: 30,208; Referee: Andrew Madley |

| 2 December 2023 14 | Burnley | 5–0 | Sheffield United | Burnley |
| 15:00 GMT | Rodriguez 1'; Bruun Larsen 29'; O'Shea (yellow card) 38'; Beyer (yellow card) 67'; Amdouni 73'; Koleosho 75'; Brownhill 80' | Report | Fleck (yellow card) 34'; McBurnie (yellow card) 37' (yellow-red card) 45+1'; Thomas (yellow card) 43'; Osula (yellow card) 64'; Ahmedhodžić (yellow card) 72'; Hamer (yellow card) 72' | Stadium: Turf Moor; Attendance: 20,891; Referee: Chris Kavanagh |

| 6 December 2023 15 | Sheffield United | 0–2 | Liverpool | Sheffield |
| 19:30 GMT | Norwood (yellow card) 90' | Report | Endō (yellow card) 34'; Van Dijk 37'; Konaté (yellow card) 62'; Núñez (yellow card) 84'; Szoboszlai 90+4' | Stadium: Bramall Lane; Attendance: 31,406; Referee: Simon Hooper |

| 9 December 2023 16 | Sheffield United | 1–0 | Brentford | Sheffield |
| 15:00 BST | Trusty (yellow card) 17'; McAtee 45+1'; Osula (yellow card) 51'; Bogle (yellow card) 82'; Robinson (yellow card) 90+1'; Foderingham (yellow card) 90+2' | Report | Onyeka (yellow card) 29' | Stadium: Bramall Lane; Attendance: 28,509; Referee: Stuart Attwell |

| 16 December 2023 17 | Chelsea | 2–0 | Sheffield United | Fulham |
| 15:00 GMT | Gallagher (yellow card) 52'; Palmer 54'; Jackson 61' | Report | McAtee (yellow card) 42'; Hamer (yellow card) 63'; Lowe (yellow card) 74' | Stadium: Stamford Bridge; Attendance: 39,559; Referee: Andrew Madley |

| 22 December 2023 18 | Aston Villa | 1–1 | Sheffield United | Birmingham |
| 20:00 GMT | Bailey (yellow card) 49'; Zaniolo (yellow card) 90+5', (goal) 90+7'; Cash (yellow card) 90+10' | Report | Larouci (yellow card) 51'; Bogle (yellow card) 69'; Archer 87'; Trusty (yellow card) 90+9' | Stadium: Villa Park; Attendance: 41,651; Referee: Anthony Taylor |

| 26 December 2023 19 | Sheffield United | 2–3 | Luton Town | Sheffield |
| 15:00 GMT | Ahmedhodžić (yellow card) 14', (goal) 69'; Hamer (yellow card) 41'; McBurnie 61'; Baldock (yellow card) 78'; Robinson (yellow card) 79'; Norwood (yellow card) 90+4' | Report | Doughty 17'; Robinson 77' (o.g.); Ben Slimane 81' (o.g.) | Stadium: Bramall Lane; Attendance: 31,041; Referee: Sam Allison |

| 30 December 2023 20 | Manchester City | 2–0 | Sheffield United | Manchester |
| 15:00 GMT | Rodri 14'; Kovačić (yellow card) 43'; Álvarez 61' | Report | Bogle (yellow card) 89' | Stadium: City of Manchester Stadium; Attendance: 53,108; Referee: David Coote |

| 21 January 2024 21 | Sheffield United | 2–2 | West Ham United | Sheffield |
| 14:00 GMT | Hamer (yellow card) 38'; Brereton Díaz 44'; Brooks (yellow card) 68'; Ahmedhodžić (yellow card) 75'; Brewster (red card) 90+3'; McBurnie 90+13' (pen.) | Report | Cornet 28'; Ward-Prowse (yellow card) 42', (goal) 79' (pen.); Coufal (yellow card) 90+3' (yellow-red card) 90+7' | Stadium: Bramall Lane; Attendance: 29,164; Referee: Michael Salisbury |

| 30 January 2024 22 | Crystal Palace | 3–2 | Sheffield United | Selhurst |
| 20:00 GMT | Eze 17', 27'; Olise 67'; Lerma (yellow card) 90+13' | Report | Brereton Díaz 1'; McAtee 20'; Trusty (yellow card) 40'; Robinson (yellow card) 42'; Norrington-Davies (yellow card) 90+5'; Ahmedhodžić (yellow card) 90+13' | Stadium: Selhurst Park; Attendance: 24,781; Referee: Tony Harrington |

| 3 February 2024 23 | Sheffield United | 0–5 | Aston Villa | Sheffield |
| 17:30 GMT | Bogle (yellow card) 44' | Report | McGinn 12'; Watkins 16'; Bailey 20'; Tielemans 30'; Moreno 47' | Stadium: Bramall Lane; Attendance: 28,978; Referee: Paul Tierney |

| 10 February 2024 24 | Luton Town | 1–3 | Sheffield United | Luton |
| 15:00 GMT | Morris (yellow card) 41', (goal) 52' (pen.) | Report | Holgate (yellow card) 10'; Hamer (yellow card) 26'; Archer 30'; McAtee 36' (pen.); Vinícius 72' | Stadium: Kenilworth Road; Attendance: 11,138; Referee: Chris Kavanagh |

| 18 February 2024 25 | Sheffield United | 0–5 | Brighton & Hove Albion | Sheffield |
| 14:00 GMT | Holgate (red card) 13'; Davies (yellow card) 90+3' | Report | Buonanotte 20', (yellow card) 56'; Welbeck 24'; Lamptey (yellow card) 45+6'; Robinson 75' (o.g.); Adingra 78', 85'; Gilmour (yellow card) 90'; Verbruggen (yellow card) 90+3' | Stadium: Bramall Lane; Attendance: 29,522; Referee: Stuart Attwell |

| 25 February 2024 26 | Wolverhampton Wanderers | 1–0 | Sheffield United | Wolverhampton |
| 13:30 GMT | Sarabia 30'; Semedo (yellow card) 72'; Toti (yellow card) 90+6' | Report | Ahmedhodžić (yellow card) 72' | Stadium: Molineux Stadium; Attendance: 30,789; Referee: Darren Bond |

| 4 March 2024 27 | Sheffield United | 0–6 | Arsenal | Sheffield |
| 20:00 GMT | Bogle (yellow card) 29' | Report | Ødegaard 5'; Bogle 13' (o.g.); Martinelli 15'; Havertz 25'; Rice 39'; White 58' | Stadium: Bramall Lane; Attendance: 29,980; Referee: Sam Barrott |
Note: Fixture was originally scheduled for 2 March, but was moved for live Sky Sports broadcast.

| 9 March 2024 28 | Bournemouth | 2–2 | Sheffield United | Bournemouth |
| 15:00 GMT | Kerekz (yellow card) 10'; Solanke (penalty missed) 14'; Smith (yellow card) 15'; Ouattara 74'; Mepham (yellow card) 88'; Ünal 90+1' | Report | Hamer 27', (yellow card) 36'; McBurnie (yellow card) 61'; Robinson 64'; Grbić (yellow card) 72'; Brereton Díaz (yellow card) 80'; Norwood (yellow card) 88' | Stadium: Dean Court; Attendance: 11,074; Referee: Anthony Taylor |

| 30 March 2024 30 | Sheffield United | 3–3 | Fulham | Sheffield |
| 15:00 GMT | Brereton Díaz 58', 70'; Holgate (yellow card) 61'; McBurnie 68'; Norwood (yellow card) 90+9'; Hamer (yellow card) 90+10'; Bogle (yellow card) 90+12' | Report | Palhinha 62'; Decordova-Reid 86'; Muniz 90+3'; Bassey (yellow card) 90+10' | Stadium: Bramall Lane; Attendance: 30,010; Referee: Tim Robinson |

| 4 April 2024 31 | Liverpool | 3–1 | Sheffield United | Liverpool |
| 19:30 BST | Núñez 17'; Mac Allister 76'; Gakpo 90' | Report | Bradley 58' (o.g.); McBurnie (yellow card) 87' | Stadium: Anfield; Attendance: 60,055; Referee: Stuart Attwell |
Note: Fixture was initially scheduled for 2 April, but was moved for live TNT Sports broadcast.

| 7 April 2024 32 | Sheffield United | 2–2 | Chelsea | Sheffield |
| 17:30 BST | Bogle 32'; Brereton Díaz (yellow card) 52'; Robinson (yellow card) 58'; Arblaster (yellow card) 89'; McBurnie 90+3'; Ahmedhodžić (yellow card) 90+8' | Report | Thiago Silva 11'; Chalobah (yellow card) 41'; Madueke 66'; Cucurella (yellow card) 86' | Stadium: Bramall Lane; Attendance: 28,638; Referee: Robert Jones |
Note: Fixture was initially scheduled for 6 April, but was moved due to the Liverpool game being moved to the Thursday. Following deliberation with Chelsea, Sheffield Council and South Yorkshire Police the kick-off time moved back to 17:30.

| 13 April 2024 33 | Brentford | 2–0 | Sheffield United | Brentford |
| 15:00 BST | Maupay (yellow card) 7'; Janelt (yellow card) 41'; Arblaster 63' (o.g.); Roerslev (yellow card) 88'; Onyeka 90+3' | Report | Brereton Díaz (yellow card) 45' | Stadium: Brentford Community Stadium; Attendance: 17,115; Referee: Sam Barrott |

| 20 April 2024 34 | Sheffield United | 1–4 | Burnley | Sheffield |
| 15:00 BST | Hamer 52'; Osborn (yellow card) 76' | Report | Bruun Larsen 38'; Assignon 40'; Foster 58'; Guðmundsson 71' | Stadium: Bramall Lane; Attendance: 28,964; Referee: Andrew Madley |

| 24 April 2024 29 | Manchester United | 4–2 | Sheffield United | Trafford |
| 20:00 BST | Maguire 42'; Fernandes 61' (pen.), 81'; Højlund 85' | Report | Bogle 35'; Holgate (yellow card) 37'; Brereton Díaz 50' | Stadium: Old Trafford; Attendance: 73,549; Referee: Michael Salisbury |
Note: Fixture was originally scheduled for 16 March, but was postponed due to Manchester United's FA Cup progression.

| 27 April 2024 35 | Newcastle United | 5–1 | Sheffield United | Newcastle upon Tyne |
| 15:00 BST | Isak 26', 61' (pen.); Bruno Guimarães 54'; Osborn 65' (o.g.); Wilson 72' | Report | Ahmedhodžić 5' | Stadium: St James' Park; Attendance: 52,196; Referee: Tony Harrington |

| 4 May 2024 36 | Sheffield United | 1–3 | Nottingham Forest | Sheffield |
| 15:00 BST | Brereton Díaz 17' (pen.); Ahmedhodžić (yellow card) 75' (yellow-red card) 90+6' | Report | Montiel (yellow card) 16'; Hudson-Odoi 27', 65'; Yates 51' | Stadium: Bramall Lane; Attendance: 28,516; Referee: Chris Kavanagh |

| 11 May 2024 37 | Everton | 1–0 | Sheffield United | Liverpool |
| 15:00 BST | Doucouré 31'; Calvert-Lewin (yellow card) 36' | Report | Robinson (yellow card) 36'; Arblaster (yellow card) 54' | Stadium: Goodison Park; Attendance: 39,221; Referee: Stuart Attwell |

| 19 May 2024 38 | Sheffield United | 0–3 | Tottenham Hotspur | Sheffield |
| 16:00 BST | Vinícius (yellow card) 37'; Robinson (yellow card) 90+3' | Report | Kulusevski 14', 65'; Porro 59' | Stadium: Bramall Lane; Attendance: 29,116; Referee: Andrew Madley |

=== FA Cup ===
Sheffield United entered in the third round, and were drawn away to Gillingham. They were then drawn at home to Brighton & Hove Albion in the fourth round.

Win Draw Loss Fixtures

| 6 January 2024 Third round | Gillingham | 0–4 | Sheffield United | Gillingham |
| 15:00 GMT | Coleman (yellow card) 82' | Report | Osula 14', 39'; Thomas (yellow card) 41'; McAtee 83', 87' | Stadium: Priestfield Stadium; Attendance: 8,809; Referee: Darren Bond |

| 27 January 2024 Fourth round | Sheffield United | 2–5 | Brighton & Hove Albion | Sheffield |
| 15:00 GMT | Norwood (yellow card) 10'; Hamer 44', (yellow card) 45+7'; Osula 45+8' | Report | Buonanotte 14'; João Pedro 29' (pen.), 52' (pen.), 67'; Webster (yellow card) 55'; Welbeck 90+7' | Stadium: Bramall Lane; Attendance: 18,391; Referee: Sunny Singh Gill |

=== EFL Cup ===
Sheffield United entered in the second round, and were drawn at home to Lincoln City.

Win Draw Loss Fixtures

| 30 August 2023 Second round | Sheffield United | 0–0 (2–3 p) | Lincoln City | Sheffield |
| 19:45 BST | Coulibaly (yellow card) 56' | Report | Burroughs (yellow card) 74'; Erhahon (yellow card) 77'; Eyoma (yellow card) 78' | Stadium: Bramall Lane; Attendance: 11,040; Referee: Paul Tierney |
| | Penalties |
| | Norwood (penalty scored); Marsh (penalty missed); Osula (penalty scored); Traoré (penalty missed); Egan (penalty missed) | | (penalty scored) Mandroiu; (penalty missed) Bishop; (penalty scored) Hamilton; (penalty scored) Sørensen |
