= Oliver Norwood =

English footballer (born 1991)

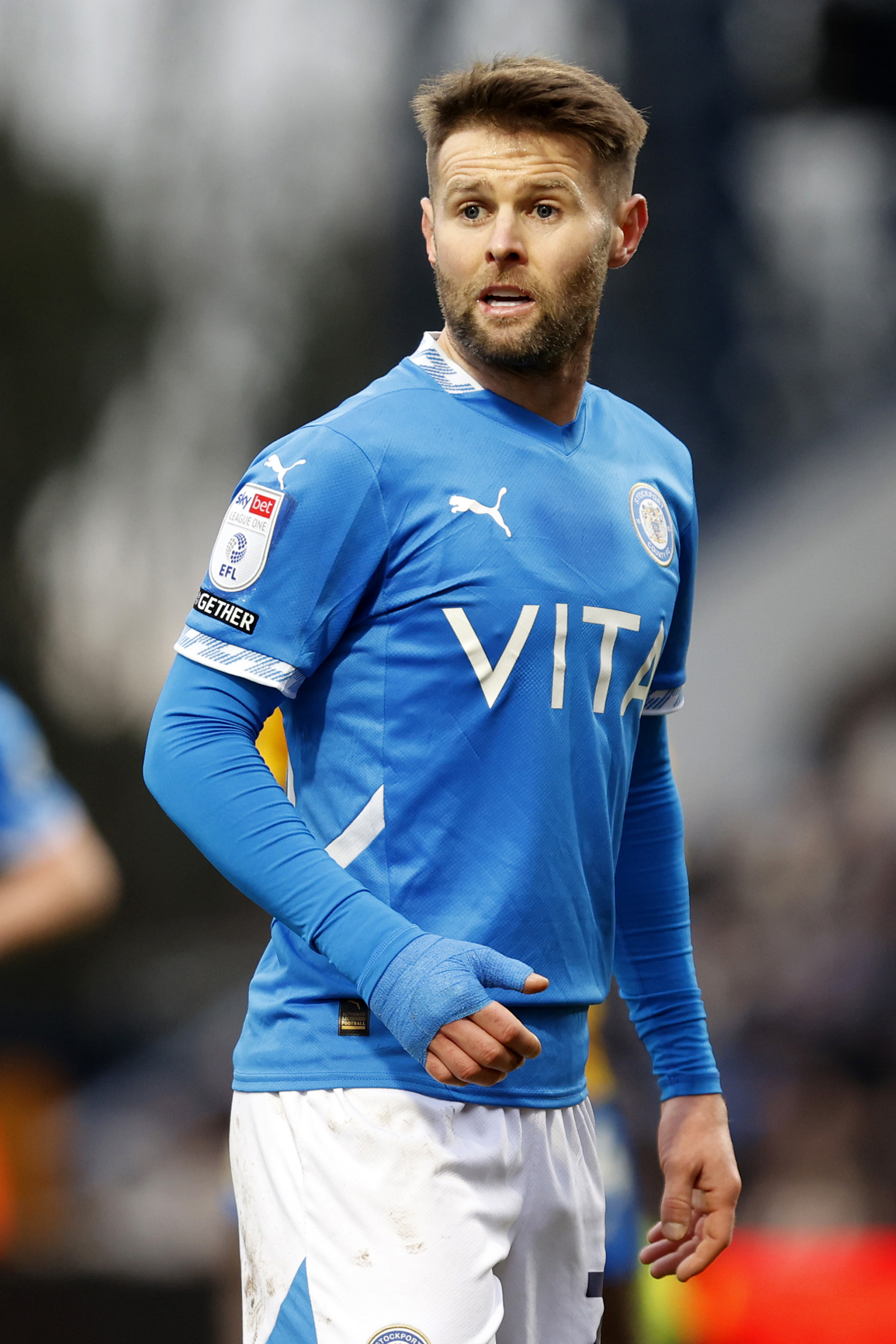
- Norwood playing for Stockport County in 2024

Personal information
- Full name: Oliver James Norwood
- Date of birth: 12 April 1991 (age 35)
- Place of birth: Burnley, England
- Height: 5 ft 11 in (1.80 m)
- Position: Defensive midfielder

Team information
- Current team: Stockport County
- Number: 10

Youth career
- 2007–2009: Manchester United

Senior career*
Years	Team	Apps	(Gls)
2009–2012	Manchester United	0	(0)
2010	→ Carlisle United (loan)	6	(0)
2011–2012	→ Scunthorpe United (loan)	15	(1)
2012	→ Coventry City (loan)	18	(2)
2012–2014	Huddersfield Town	80	(8)
2014–2016	Reading	81	(4)
2016–2019	Brighton & Hove Albion	33	(0)
2017–2018	→ Fulham (loan)	36	(5)
2018–2019	→ Sheffield United (loan)	23	(2)
2019–2024	Sheffield United	207	(6)
2024–	Stockport County	95	(12)

International career
2006–2007	England U16	9	(2)
2007	England U17	3	(0)
2010–2011	Northern Ireland U19	7	(3)
2009–2012	Northern Ireland U21	11	(4)
2009	Northern Ireland B	1	(0)
2010–2018	Northern Ireland	57	(0)
- * Club domestic league appearances and goals as of 00:13, 25 October 2026 (UTC)

Oliver James Norwood (born 12 April 1991) is a professional footballer who plays as a defensive midfielder for and captains EFL League One club Stockport County.

Norwood began his career with Manchester United, and had loan spells at Carlisle United, Scunthorpe United and Coventry City before moving permanently to Huddersfield Town and then Reading. He then achieved three consecutive promotions to the Premier League with three clubs: Brighton, Fulham and Sheffield United between 2017 and 2019 respectively, and again with the latter in 2023.

Although he was born in England, and represented the nation at under-17 level, he subsequently represented Northern Ireland at every level from under-19 to the senior team.

== Club career ==
=== Manchester United ===
==== Early career ====
Born in Burnley, Lancashire, Norwood began his football career playing for his brother's team in his home town. He was spotted by Manchester United scouts when he was 6 years old and joined the club at the age of 7. After eight appearances for Manchester United's under-18s side in 2005–06 and 2006–07, he joined the club as a trainee in July 2007. He became a regular in the under-18s team in 2007–08, scoring twice in 22 appearances, and he made his debut for the reserve team in a 2–1 away win over Middlesbrough on 6 November 2007. The following season, he scored nine goals in 28 appearances for the under-18s, as well as appearing a further 10 times for the reserves. His form prompted the club to sign him on a professional contract in July 2009.

==== 2009–10 season ====
2009–10 was a big season for Norwood, as he made the full step up to the reserve team and also received his first call-up to the first-team for their Champions League group stage match away to Wolfsburg. However, although he made the trip to Germany, Norwood was not named in the 18-man match-day squad.

==== Carlisle United (loan) ====
On 16 September 2010, Norwood signed for Carlisle United on a one-month emergency loan contract, following a knee injury to Carlisle captain Paul Thirlwell. He made his debut for the Cumbrian side on 18 September 2010 in a 0–0 draw at home to Brighton & Hove Albion, playing the full 90 minutes of the game. Norwood made a total of seven appearances during his loan spell, with six coming in the league, before his stay was cut short by injury in October 2010.

==== Scunthorpe United (loan) ====
On 24 August 2011, Norwood signed for Scunthorpe United on a six-month loan. He made his debut for Scunthorpe in the side's 2–1 League Cup second round defeat at home to Newcastle United the following day on 25 August when he played the full 90 minutes plus extra time. His league debut came just two days later with another start in a 3–2 defeat away at Sheffield Wednesday on 27 August. His first league goal of the season came in Scunthorpe's draw at home to Huddersfield Town on 25 October, scoring the opener on 10 minutes; the game ended 2–2. Norwood received the first red card of his career in Scunthorpe's 3–2 away defeat to Notts County on 26 November, when he was sent off for a foul on Jeff Hughes. Norwood played a total of 16 starts and scored once during his loan spell before returning to parent club Manchester United in January 2012.

==== Coventry City (loan) ====
Norwood completed a loan switch to Championship side Coventry City on the January 2012 deadline day, and remained on loan until the end of the season. Norwood made his Coventry City debut in the team's 3–2 home defeat to Ipswich Town on 4 February, coming on as a 25th-minute substitute for David Bell; his first start for the club came in their next game: a 2–0 defeat on 11 February away to Reading. On 21 March, he scored a stoppage-time equaliser against Cardiff to earn a point for the Sky Blues. He scored his second Coventry City goal in the 2–0 home win against Portsmouth on 24 March 2012.

=== Huddersfield Town ===
At the end of the 2011–12 season, Norwood confirmed that he was rejecting Manchester United's offer of a contract extension to pursue first-team football. In June 2012, Manchester United agreed compensation packages for Norwood with Championship clubs Barnsley and Huddersfield Town. Norwood rejected Barnsley's offer on 29 June, and he signed a three-year contract with Huddersfield later that day. He made his league debut in a 1–0 away defeat to Cardiff City on 17 August. Norwood scored his first goal for the Terriers with the opener in a 3–1 win over Sheffield Wednesday at Hillsborough Stadium on 19 September.

=== Reading ===
On 19 August 2014, Norwood was spotted in the crowd at the Madejski Stadium watching his current club, Huddersfield Town, playing the club he would soon join. He had his medical the following day, and then agreed personal terms the day after that. The fee was described by Huddersfield as a "significant and undisclosed fee". Norwood made his Reading debut as a second-half substitute in the 4–0 defeat by Nottingham Forest on 23 August 2014.

=== Brighton & Hove Albion ===
On 3 August 2016, Norwood signed a three-year contract with Brighton & Hove Albion. On 16 August, Norwood made his debut in the 3–0 win over Rotherham United.

During the 2016–17 season, he played 33 times as Brighton & Hove Albion earned promotion to the Premier League after finishing as runners-up to Newcastle United in the Championship.

==== Fulham (loan) ====
In July 2017, Norwood joined EFL Championship side Fulham on a season-long loan deal following Brighton's promotion to the Premier League. He scored his first goal for Fulham in a 2–1 loss at Burton Albion on 16 September 2017.

During his loan spell, Norwood scored 5 goals and played 41 times for Fulham in all competitions including playing in the playoff final, as Fulham earned promotion to Premier League after winning the 2018 Championship play-off final against Aston Villa at Wembley Stadium on 26 May 2018.

==== Loan to Sheffield United and permanent move ====
On 13 August 2018, Norwood joined Sheffield United in an initial loan deal, with the transfer due to be made permanent in January 2019. He made his debut for the club the following day against Hull City in a league cup tie. The Blades lost 5–4 on penalties following a 1–1 draw with Norwood being the only player to miss in the penalty shoot-out. He scored his first goal for the club in a 4–1 win over Aston Villa on 1 September 2018, netting a free-kick.

On 4 January 2019, Norwood made his deal with Sheffield United permanent. In March, he was selected to the 2018–19 Championship Team of the Season. On 28 April, Norwood and Sheffield United were promoted to the Premier League. On 10 June 2020, Norwood signed a new three-year contract with the club.

On 4 November 2023, he scored a penalty in the tenth minute of stoppage time to grant Sheffield United a 2–1 win over Wolverhampton Wanderers, to be his club's first victory after 11 matches in the 2023–24 season.

On 29 May 2024, Sheffield United announced that Norwood would be leaving the club in the summer when his contract would expire.

=== Stockport County ===
On 23 August 2024, Norwood joined newly promoted League One club Stockport County on a three-year deal following a successful trial period.

On 7 July 2026, Norwood signed a new contract with Stockport County extending his stay at the club until at least June 2028. On 7 August, Norwood was appointed captain of Stockport for the 2026–27 season.

== International career ==
=== England youth ===
Although he was born in England, Norwood's heritage is Northern Irish; it is this heritage that has allowed him to represent both England and Northern Ireland in international football. He was first called up to the England under-17 team in September 2007 ahead of their 2008 UEFA Under-17 Championship qualifying matches against Malta, Estonia and Portugal in Estonia from 21 to 26 October 2007. He appeared in all three fixtures, his debut coming in the 6–0 win over Malta on 21 October, in which he came on as a 61st-minute substitute for Harry Forrester. However, the match against Portugal would prove to be his final appearance for an England team.

=== Northern Ireland youth & B teams ===
Norwood made his first appearance for a Northern Ireland team at "B" international level, in a 3–0 defeat away to Scotland B on 6 May 2009; he came on as a substitute for Niall McGinn in the 67th minute, and forced a fingertip save from Scotland goalkeeper David Marshall with a 30-yard free-kick three minutes later. His under-21 debut followed three months later, when he came on as a substitute for Corry Evans in a 2–1 away defeat to Portugal on 12 August 2009. Norwood received national media attention in November 2009 after he scored free-kicks against both Germany and the Czech Republic's under-21 teams.

Norwood's reverse progression through the Northern Irish national teams was completed in May 2010, when he appeared for the under-19 side in the 2010 UEFA Under-19 Championship elite qualifying round. In his first match for the under-19s, against Russia, he scored two goals in the last 10 minutes to salvage a draw after Northern Ireland went 2–0 down shortly into the second half. He then followed this up with a penalty to open the scoring against Italy two days later, only for Italy to win the match 3–2.

=== Northern Ireland senior team ===
Norwood made his debut for the Northern Ireland senior side on 11 August 2010, in a 2–0 friendly defeat away to Montenegro. He came on as a second-half substitute for Sammy Clingan, and in the final few minutes attempted to chip the Montenegrin goalkeeper Mladen Božović, only to send the ball over the bar. He started for the first time in the senior team when Northern Ireland lost 3–0 to Italy on their last game in UEFA Euro 2012 qualifiers.

Norwood retired from international football on 19 August 2019, aged 28.

== Style of play ==
Norwood is a central midfielder, known for his passing and ability to dictate tempo. He is renowned as a free-kick and set piece specialist and for scoring goals from long range.

== Career statistics ==
=== Club ===
As of match played 24 October 2026

Appearances and goals by club, season and competition
Club	Season	League			FA Cup		League Cup		Other		Total	
Club	Season	Division	Apps	Goals	Apps	Goals	Apps	Goals	Apps	Goals	Apps	Goals
Manchester United	2009–10	Premier League	0	0	0	0	0	0	0	0	0	0
Manchester United	2010–11	Premier League	0	0	0	0	0	0	0	0	0	0
Manchester United	2011–12	Premier League	0	0	—		—		0	0	0	0
Manchester United	Total		0	0	0	0	0	0	0	0	0	0
Carlisle United (loan)	2010–11	League One	6	0	—		—		1 (Note: Appearance(s) in Football League/EFL Trophy)	0	7	0
Scunthorpe United (loan)	2011–12	League One	15	1	1	0	1	0	1	0	18	1
Coventry City (loan)	2011–12	Championship	18	2	—		—		—		18	2
Huddersfield Town	2012–13	Championship	39	3	4	0	0	0	—		43	3
Huddersfield Town	2013–14	Championship	40	5	2	1	3	0	—		45	6
Huddersfield Town	2014–15	Championship	1	0	—		1	0	—		2	0
Huddersfield Town	Total		80	8	6	1	4	0	—		90	9
Reading	2014–15	Championship	38	1	4	1	—		—		42	2
Reading	2015–16	Championship	43	3	5	0	2	0	—		50	3
Reading	Total		81	4	9	1	2	0	—		92	5
Brighton & Hove Albion	2016–17	Championship	33	0	1	0	3	0	—		37	0
Brighton & Hove Albion	2017–18	Premier League	0	0	—		—		—		0	0
Brighton & Hove Albion	2018–19	Premier League	0	0	—		—		—		0	0
Brighton & Hove Albion	Total		33	0	1	0	3	0	—		37	0
Fulham (loan)	2017–18	Championship	36	5	1	0	1	0	3 (Note: Appearance(s) in Championship play-offs)	0	41	5
Sheffield United (loan)	2018–19	Championship	23	2	0	0	1	0	—		24	2
Sheffield United	2018–19	Championship	20	1	0	0	0	0	—		20	1
Sheffield United	2019–20	Premier League	38	1	2	1	1	1	—		41	3
Sheffield United	2020–21	Premier League	32	0	4	0	1	0	—		37	0
Sheffield United	2021–22	Championship	44	1	1	0	2	0	2	0	49	1
Sheffield United	2022–23	Championship	46	2	4	1	1	0	—		51	3
Sheffield United	2023–24	Premier League	27	1	0	0	1	0	—		28	1
Sheffield United	Total		207	6	11	2	6	1	2	0	226	9
Stockport County	2024–25	League One	42	3	3	0	0	0	4 (Note: Two appearances and one goal in EFL Trophy, two appearances and one goal in the EFL League One play-offs)	2	49	5
Stockport County	2025–26	League One	41	8	1	1	2	0	6 (Note: Three appearances in EFL League One play-offs; three appearances, two goals in EFL Trophy)	2	50	11
Stockport County	2026–27	League One	12	1	0	0	1	0	0	0	13	1
Stockport County	Total		95	12	4	1	3	0	10	4	112	17
Career total			594	40	33	5	21	1	17	4	665	50

=== International ===
Appearances and goals by national team and year
National team	Year	Apps	Goals
Northern Ireland	2010	1	0
Northern Ireland	2011	4	0
Northern Ireland	2012	4	0
Northern Ireland	2013	5	0
Northern Ireland	2014	7	0
Northern Ireland	2015	9	0
Northern Ireland	2016	13	0
Northern Ireland	2017	9	0
Northern Ireland	2018	5	0
Total		57	0

== Honours ==
Brighton & Hove Albion

- EFL Championship runner-up: 2016–17

Fulham

- EFL Championship play-offs: 2018

Sheffield United

- EFL Championship runner-up: 2018–19, 2022–23

Stockport County

- EFL Trophy runner-up: 2025–26

Individual

- PFA Team of the Year: 2018–19 Championship, 2025–26 League One
- EFL League One Team of the Season: 2025–26
