= Jack Robinson (footballer, born 1993) =

English footballer (born 1993)

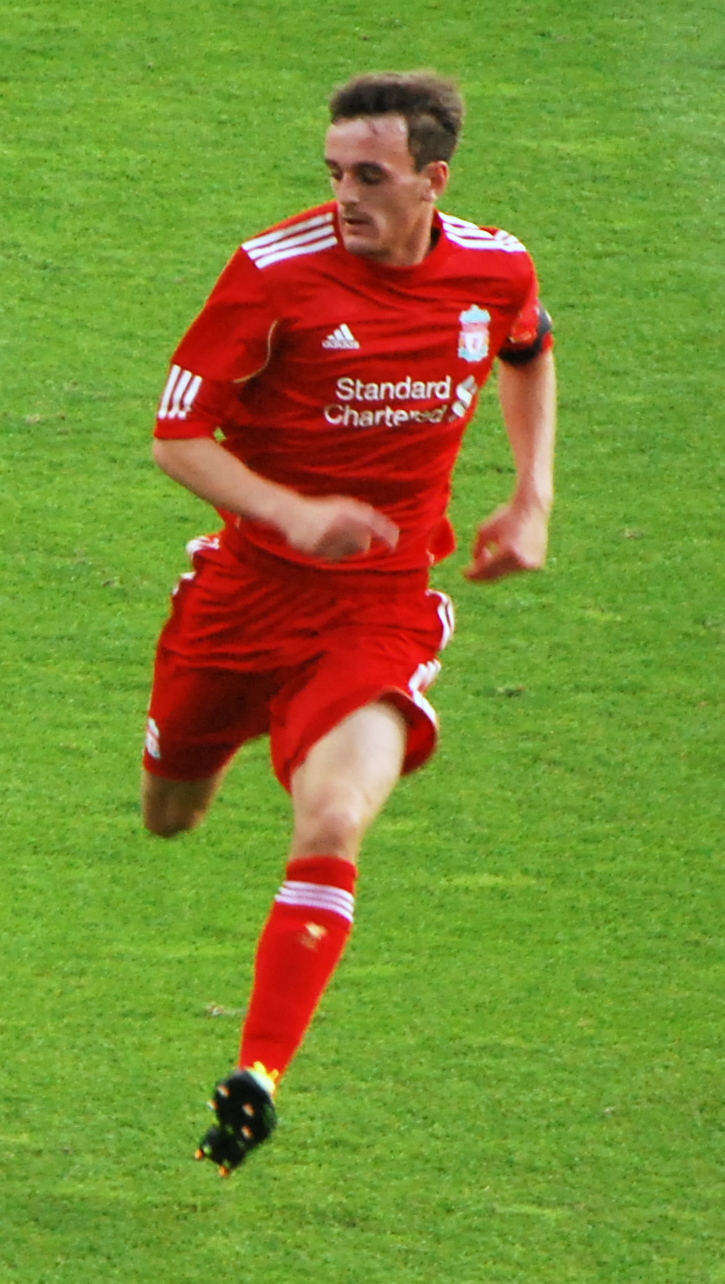
- Robinson playing for Liverpool in 2011

Personal information
- Full name: Jack Robinson
- Date of birth: 1 September 1993 (age 33)
- Place of birth: Warrington, England
- Height: 5 ft 11 in (1.80 m)
- Position: Defender

Team information
- Current team: Derby County
- Number: 14

Youth career
- 2002–2010: Liverpool

Senior career*
| Years | Team | Apps | (Gls) |
| 2010–2014 | Liverpool | 3 | (0) |
| 2013 | → Wolverhampton Wanderers (loan) | 11 | (0) |
| 2013–2014 | → Blackpool (loan) | 34 | (0) |
| 2014–2018 | Queens Park Rangers | 39 | (2) |
| 2014–2015 | → Huddersfield Town (loan) | 30 | (0) |
| 2018–2020 | Nottingham Forest | 56 | (2) |
| 2020–2025 | Sheffield United | 142 | (7) |
| 2025–2026 | Birmingham City | 15 | (1) |
| 2026– | Derby County | 4 | (1) |

International career
| 2008 | England U16 | 1 | (0) |
| 2009–2010 | England U17 | 5 | (0) |
| 2010 | England U18 | 1 | (0) |
| 2011–2012 | England U19 | 12 | (1) |
| 2012–2014 | England U21 | 10 | (1) |
- * Club domestic league appearances and goals as of 22:07, 6 November 2026 (UTC)

Jack Robinson (born 1 September 1993) is an English professional footballer who plays as a defender for EFL Championship club Derby County.

Robinson made his senior debut for Liverpool at the age of 16 years and 250 days, which at the time made him the club's youngest ever player. He has also played for Queens Park Rangers, Nottingham Forest, Sheffield United, and Birmingham City, with prior loan stints at Wolverhampton Wanderers, Blackpool, and Huddersfield Town.

A former English youth international across multiple ranks, Robinson has been capped by England at under-21 level.

== Career ==
=== Liverpool ===
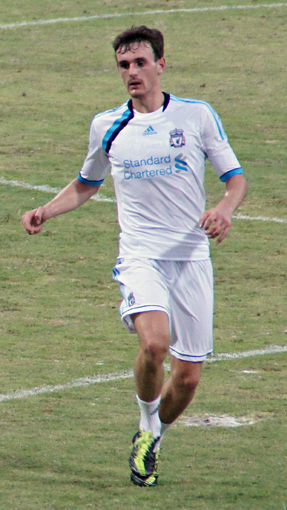
Robinson training with Liverpool in 2011

Robinson was born in Warrington, Cheshire. Having progressed through Liverpool's academy system, he made his senior debut on 9 May 2010 as a late substitute at Hull City in manager Rafael Benítez's final game in charge of the club. Robinson's appearance made him the youngest player to have played in a first team match for the club, at age 16 years and 250 days, breaking Max Thompson's 36-year-old record. This record was subsequently broken by Jerome Sinclair in September 2012.

Robinson was registered as an under-21 player for the 2010–11 season. His first appearance of the season came in April 2011 in a 1–1 draw at Arsenal as a replacement for the injured Fábio Aurélio; his performance against Theo Walcott in this game earned him a place in the BBC Sport pundit Garth Crooks's team of the week. One week later, on 23 April 2011, he started his first ever game for the Reds in a 5–0 victory against Birmingham City.

With the signing of left-back José Enrique in summer 2011, Robinson's chances of first team action became even more restricted. He made only two appearances during the 2011–12 season, both in League Cup ties: a 3–1 away win at Exeter on 24 August 2011 and a 2–1 win at Brighton & Hove Albion on 21 September 2011. In October 2011, he signed a new long-term contract with Liverpool, but his season was ruined by injury as firstly he underwent surgery on a foot problem, then suffered a groin injury.

With the departure of Fábio Aurélio in summer 2012 and the arrival of Brendan Rodgers as manager, Robinson was promoted to second choice left-back. On 23 August 2012, he made his first European appearance for Liverpool as he started their 1–0 UEFA Europa League win at Hearts of Midlothian. He also started in the next Europa League game against Udinese, as well as featuring in all four of the club's matches in the domestic cup competitions during the season.

With opportunities at Anfield limited, so as to gain first team experience, Robinson was loaned out to Championship side Wolverhampton Wanderers in February 2013 for the remainder of the 2012–13 season. He went straight into the Wolves starting line-up in place of the experienced Stephen Ward and soon established himself as a key player in their ultimately unsuccessful battle against relegation.

==== Loan to Blackpool ====
On 1 August 2013, Robinson joined Championship side Blackpool on a season-long youth loan. He made his debut for the club two days later against Doncaster Rovers, coming on as a 65th-minute substitute for Bob Harris in a 1–3 win. He made his full debut in Blackpool's West Lancashire derby League Cup first round opener against Preston North End, completing the full 90 minutes in a 1–0 defeat. Robinson started and finished all four of Blackpool's next four fixtures against Barnsley, Middlesbrough, Reading and Watford, picking up a yellow card in the latter.

In Robinson's next start for Blackpool, against AFC Bournemouth on 14 September 2013, he was sent off for a second bookable offence in the 59th minute with the score at 1–2, which finished in favour of Blackpool. After missing Blackpool's next match away at Millwall on 17 September 2013 through suspension, he was put straight back into the starting line-up for the club's 2–2 draw at home to Leicester City on 21 September 2013. He then went on to start all of Blackpool's next three league fixtures, picking up a yellow card in the Tangerines 1–1 draw away at Huddersfield Town on 27 September 2013 and playing the full 90 minutes in the clubs back-to-back goalless draws against Bolton Wanderers and Charlton Athletic respectively.

=== Queens Park Rangers ===
On 28 August 2014, Robinson joined Queens Park Rangers and was sent out on loan the same day as signing.

==== Loan to Huddersfield Town ====
Immediately after signing for QPR, Robinson joined Huddersfield Town for the 2014–15 season. He made his Town debut two days later in the 4–2 defeat against Watford at Vicarage Road. He made the left-back position his own after a difficult start, but his loan ended early after he jarred his knee in the 1–1 draw against Birmingham City on 14 March 2015. A scan later revealed he needed surgery ruling him out for between 9–12 months, prematurely ending his loan with the Terriers.

==== QPR return ====
After an injury laden beginning to his Rangers career, including recovering from the knee injury which had ruled Robinson out for several months, the 17–18 season saw Robinson cement his place in the Rangers first team playing out of position at centre half. He scored his first two career goals in an away win against Birmingham City on 16 December 2017.

On 26 June 2018, Robinson left the club after rejecting a new contract to stay at Queens Park Rangers.

=== Nottingham Forest ===
On 30 June 2018, Robinson joined Nottingham Forest on an initial two-year deal.

=== Sheffield United ===
On 21 January 2020, Robinson signed for Sheffield United for an undisclosed fee on a two-and-a-half-year deal. Chris Wilder said of Robinson that he has "got a great pedigree and he will make our squad stronger". He made his debut for Sheffield United in an FA Cup tie against Millwall on 25 January.

Robinson helped the club win promotion to the Premier League at the end of the 2022–23 season, al the club were relegated again after finishing 20th the following season.

=== Derby County ===
On 17 October 2026, Robinson signed a short-term contract with EFL Championship side Derby County. He made his debut for the club in a 1–1 draw against former club Sheffield United on 24 October. Robinson scored his first goal for Derby County on 6 November, in a 3–1 victory over Bolton Wanderers.

== International career ==
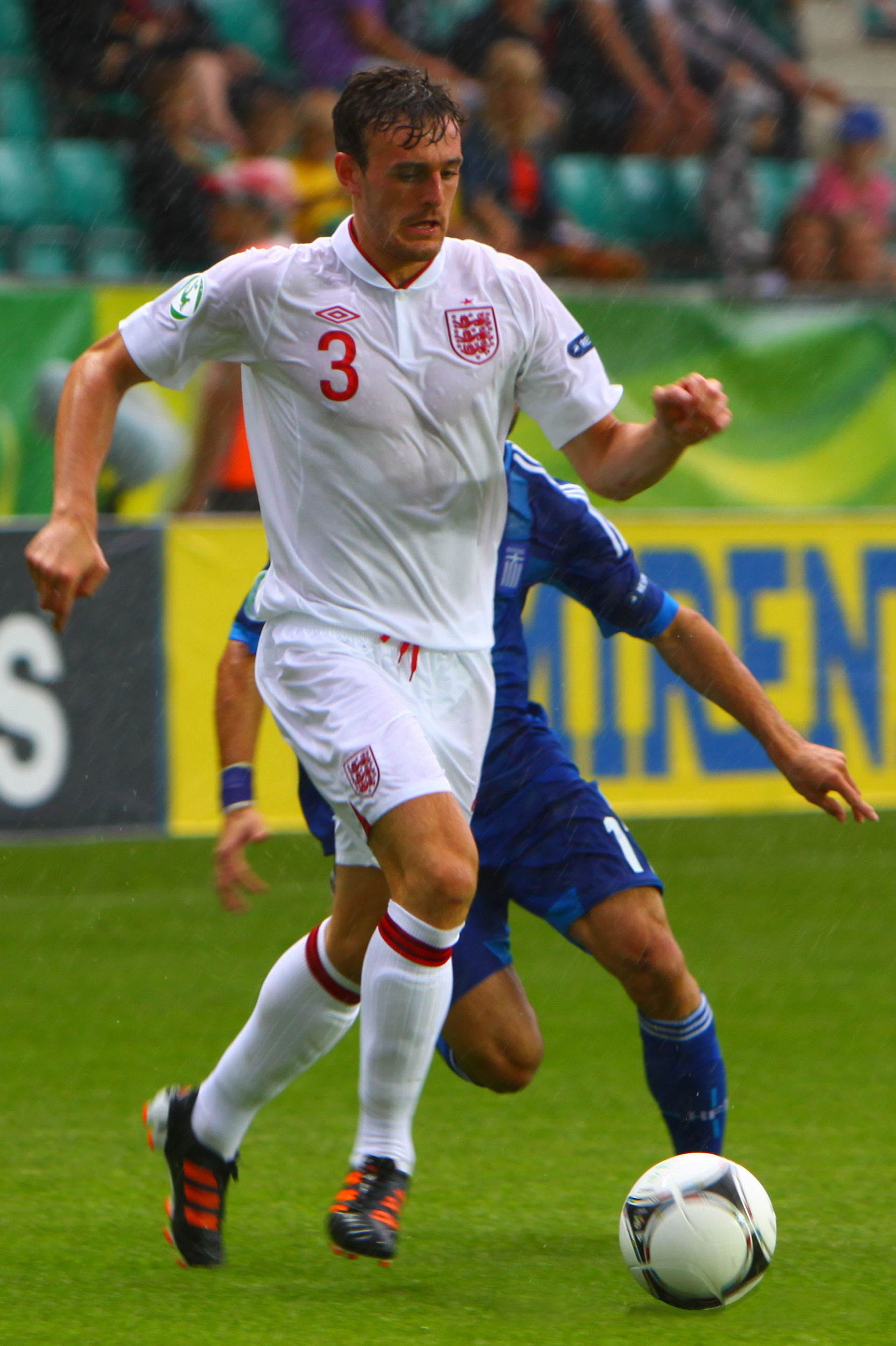
Robinson playing for England U19 against Greece in 2012

Robinson has represented England at various youth levels up until England U21s.

Having regained his fitness following a groin injury, Robinson was selected by England for the 2012 Under-19 European Championships in Estonia. He played in all four of England's matches during the tournament as they were eliminated at the semi-final stage.

== Career statistics ==
As of match played 6 November 2026

Appearances and goals by club, season and competition
| Club | Season | League | | | FA Cup | | League Cup | | Other | | Total | |
| Club | Season | Division | Apps | Goals | Apps | Goals | Apps | Goals | Apps | Goals | Apps | Goals |
|---|---|---|---|---|---|---|---|---|---|---|---|---|
| Liverpool | 2009–10 | Premier League | 1 | 0 | 0 | 0 | 0 | 0 | 0 | 0 | 1 | 0 |
| Liverpool | 2010–11 | Premier League | 2 | 0 | 0 | 0 | 0 | 0 | 0 | 0 | 2 | 0 |
| Liverpool | 2011–12 | Premier League | 0 | 0 | 0 | 0 | 2 | 0 | — | | 2 | 0 |
| Liverpool | 2012–13 | Premier League | 0 | 0 | 2 | 0 | 2 | 0 | 2 (Note: Appearance(s) in UEFA Europa League) | 0 | 6 | 0 |
| Liverpool | 2013–14 | Premier League | 0 | 0 | 0 | 0 | 0 | 0 | — | | 0 | 0 |
| Liverpool | Total | | 3 | 0 | 2 | 0 | 4 | 0 | 2 | 0 | 11 | 0 |
| Wolverhampton Wanderers (loan) | 2012–13 | Championship | 11 | 0 | 0 | 0 | 0 | 0 | — | | 11 | 0 |
| Blackpool (loan) | 2013–14 | Championship | 34 | 0 | 1 | 0 | 1 | 0 | — | | 36 | 0 |
| Queens Park Rangers | 2014–15 | Premier League | 0 | 0 | 0 | 0 | 0 | 0 | — | | 0 | 0 |
| Queens Park Rangers | 2015–16 | Championship | 1 | 0 | 0 | 0 | 0 | 0 | — | | 1 | 0 |
| Queens Park Rangers | 2016–17 | Championship | 7 | 0 | 0 | 0 | 0 | 0 | — | | 7 | 0 |
| Queens Park Rangers | 2017–18 | Championship | 31 | 2 | 1 | 0 | 2 | 0 | — | | 34 | 2 |
| Queens Park Rangers | Total | | 39 | 2 | 1 | 0 | 2 | 0 | — | | 42 | 2 |
| Huddersfield Town (loan) | 2014–15 | Championship | 30 | 0 | 1 | 0 | 0 | 0 | — | | 31 | 0 |
| Nottingham Forest | 2018–19 | Championship | 38 | 2 | 0 | 0 | 2 | 0 | — | | 40 | 2 |
| Nottingham Forest | 2019–20 | Championship | 18 | 0 | 0 | 0 | 1 | 0 | — | | 19 | 0 |
| Nottingham Forest | Total | | 56 | 2 | 0 | 0 | 3 | 0 | — | | 59 | 2 |
| Sheffield United | 2019–20 | Premier League | 6 | 0 | 3 | 0 | 0 | 0 | — | | 9 | 0 |
| Sheffield United | 2020–21 | Premier League | 11 | 0 | 0 | 0 | 1 | 0 | — | | 12 | 0 |
| Sheffield United | 2021–22 | Championship | 27 | 3 | 1 | 0 | 2 | 0 | 2 (Note: Appearances in Championship play-offs) | 0 | 32 | 3 |
| Sheffield United | 2022–23 | Championship | 27 | 3 | 5 | 0 | 0 | 0 | — | | 32 | 3 |
| Sheffield United | 2023–24 | Premier League | 34 | 1 | 1 | 0 | 0 | 0 | — | | 35 | 1 |
| Sheffield United | 2024–25 | Championship | 34 | 0 | 1 | 0 | 0 | 0 | 3 | 0 | 38 | 0 |
| Sheffield United | 2025–26 | Championship | 3 | 0 | 0 | 0 | 1 | 0 | — | | 4 | 0 |
| Sheffield United | Total | | 142 | 7 | 11 | 0 | 4 | 0 | 5 | 0 | 162 | 7 |
| Birmingham City | 2025–26 | Championship | 15 | 1 | 1 | 0 | — | | — | | 16 | 1 |
| Derby County | 2026–27 | Championship | 4 | 1 | 0 | 0 | — | | — | | 4 | 1 |
| Career total | | | 334 | 13 | 17 | 0 | 15 | 0 | 7 | 0 | 372 | 14 |

== Honours ==
Sheffield United

- EFL Championship: 2022–23, runner-up
