= Oli McBurnie =

Scottish footballer (born 1996)

- McBurnie in 2026

Personal information
- Full name: Oliver Robert McBurnie
- Date of birth: 4 June 1996 (age 30)
- Place of birth: Leeds, England
- Height: 6 ft 2 in (1.88 m)
- Position: Striker

Team information
- Current team: Hull City
- Number: 9

Youth career
- –2010: Leeds United
- 2010–2013: Bradford City

Senior career*
Years	Team	Apps	(Gls)
2013–2015	Bradford City	15	(0)
2015	→ Chester (loan)	4	(1)
2015	→ Chester (loan)	10	(4)
2015–2019	Swansea City	58	(22)
2015	→ Newport County (loan)	3	(3)
2016	→ Bristol Rovers (loan)	5	(0)
2018	→ Barnsley (loan)	17	(9)
2019–2024	Sheffield United	146	(26)
2024–2025	Las Palmas	34	(3)
2025–	Hull City	48	(21)

International career^{‡}
2014–2015	Scotland U19	4	(1)
2015–2017	Scotland U21	12	(2)
2018–	Scotland	22	(0)
- * Club domestic league appearances and goals as of 15:59, 22 November 2026 (UTC) ‡ National team caps and goals as of 16 November 2026

Oliver Robert McBurnie (born 4 June 1996) is a professional footballer who plays as a striker for Premier League club Hull City and the Scotland national football team.

After playing youth football for Leeds United, McBurnie began his career with Bradford City, spending two loan spells at Chester. He later signed for Swansea City, spending time on loan at Newport County, Bristol Rovers and Barnsley.

Born in England to Scottish parents, he represents Scotland at international level, making his senior debut in March 2018. He won 16 caps between then and 2021, but then went five years without being selected. He was recalled in September 2026.

== Early life ==
McBurnie was born in Leeds, West Yorkshire. He grew up in the suburb of Garforth, attending Garforth Academy. He still lived in Garforth as of July 2020.

== Club career ==
=== Bradford City ===
McBurnie started at Leeds United's academy from a young age, playing with the likes of Lewie Coyle and Tyler Denton in the youth setup, before he was released at under-14s level. He joined Bradford City's academy, but played for Manchester United in the 2013 Milk Cup.

McBurnie was given a three-year professional contract by Bradford on 23 August 2013. In November 2013, Bradford City manager Phil Parkinson stated that he was considering involving McBurnie with the club's first team squad. He made his professional debut on 9 November 2013, in the FA Cup, appearing as a substitute. He later spoke about his desire for further first-team action, and made his first senior start on 26 December 2013, at the age of 17.

He was offered a new contract by the club at the end of the 2013–14 season. McBurnie later spoke about his first season as a professional, describing it as "ridiculous." He also spoke about his excitement ahead of the 2014–15 season. In September 2014, Parkinson told McBurnie to "step up to the plate" and make the most of the first-team appearances he was making following an injury to regular starter James Hanson. In October 2014, Parkinson hinted that McBurnie would be sent out on loan.

McBurnie joined Chester on a one-month loan deal on 22 January 2015. He was recalled early, returning to Bradford on 20 February following injuries to several first-team players. Parkinson thought the loan spell had been beneficial to McBurnie's development. He re-joined Chester on loan on 6 March.

=== Swansea City ===
On 13 July 2015, McBurnie joined Swansea City on a three-year deal for an undisclosed fee, later revealed to be £250,000. Later that month he made his first appearances for Swansea in under-21 matches in Holland.

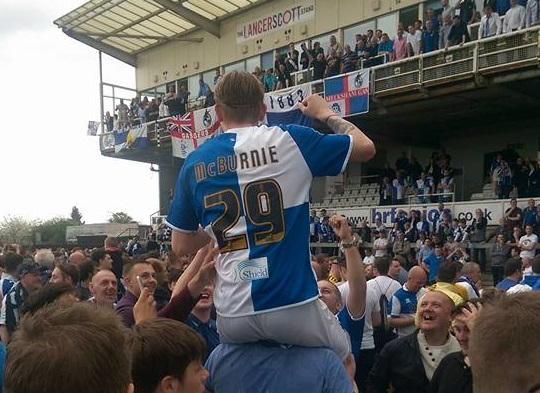
McBurnie celebrating with Bristol Rovers fans following the club's promotion from League Two

In November 2015, McBurnie joined League Two club Newport County on an initial one-month loan. McBurnie made his debut for Newport on 28 November in a league game against Luton Town, scoring a hat-trick after coming on as a 58th-minute substitute. While the loan had been earlier extended until January 2016, he was recalled by Swansea on 24 December 2015. On 7 March 2016, he joined Bristol Rovers on loan for the remainder of the 2015–16 season.

On 23 August 2016, McBurnie scored twice on his debut for Swansea's first team in the second-round 2016–17 EFL Cup tie against Peterborough United. The match finished 1–3 in Swansea's favour. His performance was praised by ex-Swansea player Warren Feeney. McBurnie won the Premier League 2 'Player of the Month' award for January 2017. In November 2016, McBurnie signed a one-year contract extension at the Liberty Stadium until June 2019.

McBurnie appeared as a substitute in Swansea's first three matches of the 2017–18 Premier League. On 31 August 2017, the last day of the English summer transfer window, a loan to Championship club Barnsley for the rest of the season was agreed. However, despite training with Barnsley the transfer was not completed, due to an issue with the paperwork and he returned to Swansea. Upon returning to Swansea under Paul Clement he played for Swansea's Under-23s scoring 10 goals in 7 games, before earning a recall to the first team under new manager Carlos Carvalhal, where he made 12 appearances including starting against Liverpool and Newcastle.

On 31 January 2018, he moved on loan to Barnsley, then managed by Paul Heckingbottom. He scored his first goal for Barnsley in a 1–1 draw with Sheffield Wednesday on 10 February 2018. After scoring six goals in his first eight games at Barnsley, McBurnie was named the Championship Player of the Month for February and also received a call up to the Scotland squad for his form. On 28 April 2018, McBurnie won Barnsley's Player Of The Year award.

McBurnie returned to Swansea at the end of the season, and stated that he would use his Championship experience to help fire them to promotion. After speculation strongly linking him with moves to either Leeds United or Rangers, on 12 July 2018 he signed a new three-year contract extension at Swansea City with the option of a fourth year. McBurnie scored his first league goal for Swansea in their first match of the 2018–19 season a 2–1 victory against Sheffield United.

=== Sheffield United ===
In July 2019, McBurnie was the subject of a transfer bid from Sheffield United, which was rejected by Swansea. Later that month Sheffield United increased their bid, which Swansea accepted.

On 2 August 2019, McBurnie signed for Sheffield United on a four-year deal for a fee of £17.5 million, potentially rising to £20 million. The fee set a new club record for Sheffield United and a new record for a transfer involving a Scottish player, until it was beaten a few days later by Kieran Tierney's £25 million move from Celtic to Arsenal. McBurnie's former club Bradford City were set to receive a "windfall" from his sale, later confirmed to be around £2 million.

On 24 November 2019, he scored the equaliser as Sheffield United drew 3–3 with Manchester United at Bramall Lane. The goal was challenged by VAR but upheld. He finished the 2019–20 season as Sheffield United's joint highest goalscorer along with Lys Mousset on six goals. In April 2022, he suffered a foot injury and was ruled out for "months".

On 26 August 2022, he scored his first league goal in 43 games (since December 2020), and his first in any competition for 11 months, scoring the equaliser in a 1–1 draw away at Luton Town. He finished the 2022–23 season with 15 goals in all competitions as United were promoted back to the Premier League.

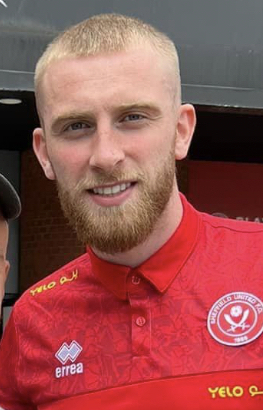
McBurnie with Sheffield United in 2023

On 21 January 2024, he converted an equalising penalty in a 2–2 home draw against West Ham United. The goal was timed at 102:08, the latest Premier League goal on record.

He was released by the club on expiration of his contract on 1 July 2024.

=== Las Palmas ===
On 25 July 2024, McBurnie signed for La Liga club Las Palmas, signing a three-year contract. Later that year, on 3 December, he scored his first goals for the club by netting a brace in a 2–1 away win over CE Europa in the Copa del Rey. On 6 April 2025, he scored his first La Liga goal in a 3–1 defeat against Real Sociedad. He left the club in July 2025.

=== Hull City ===
On 6 August 2025, McBurnie returned to England, joining Championship club Hull City on a three-year deal with a club option for a further year. He made his debut on 9 August, the opening day of the season, when he came off the bench as a 71st-minute substitute for Kyle Joseph in a 0–0 away draw to Coventry City. He scored his first goal for the club in the First Round of the EFL Cup on 12 August in a 3–3 draw away at Wrexham. A run of five goals and one assist in four matches saw him named Championship Player of the Month for September 2025. On 23 May 2026, he scored a stoppage-time winner against Middlesbrough in the Championship play-off final, sealing a 1–0 victory and earning his club promotion to the Premier League for the first time in nine years.

== International career ==
=== Youth career ===
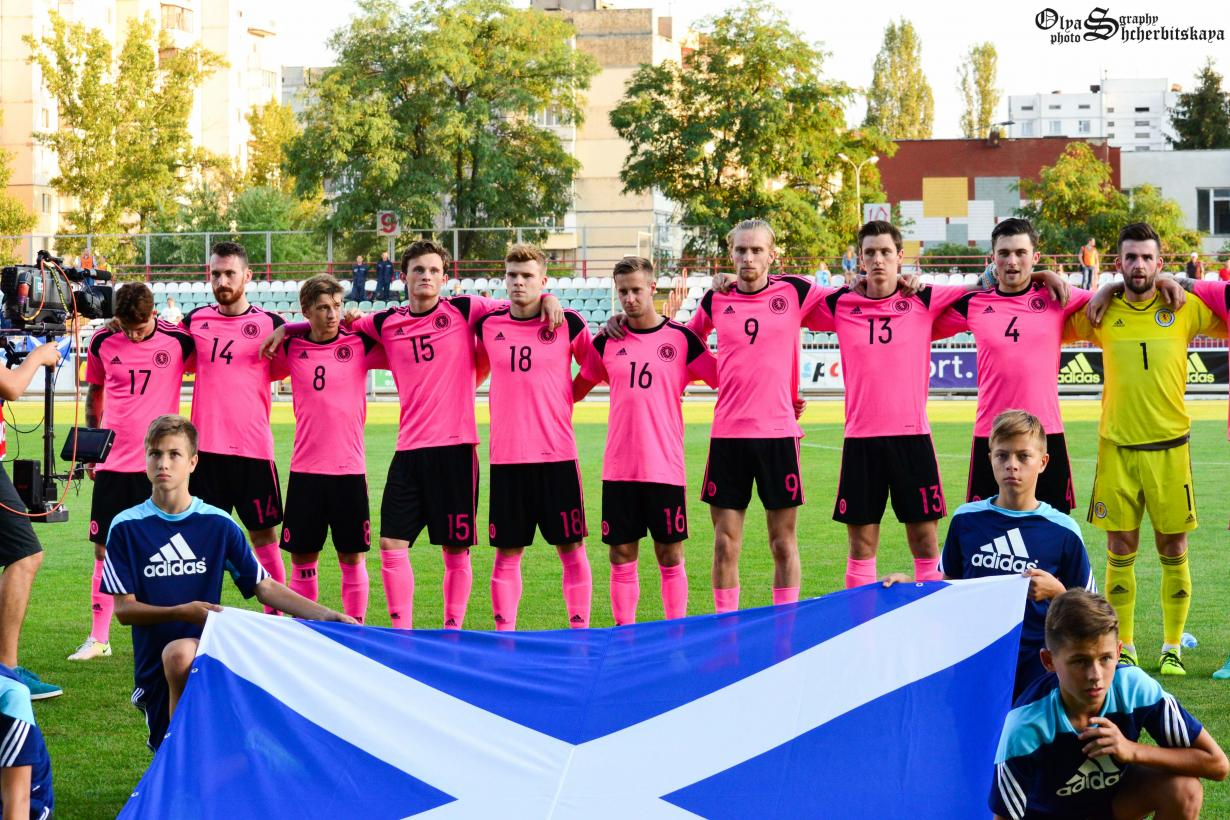
McBurnie (No 9) with Scotland U21s in Ukraine, 2016

Despite being born and raised in Leeds, McBurnie has always considered himself Scottish and never had any interest in playing for England. "I never really had any choice. All my family are from Glasgow. My brother Zander and I always got brought up as being Scottish. We would go into school on a dress-down day and we would wear our Scotland tops," he told The Press and Journal. "It seems a bit alien to me when people say I'm English, but with the accent I guess it comes with the territory. We were brought up Scottish. We were brought up to celebrate when England got knocked out of the World Cup. That was my childhood."

In September 2013, McBurnie was called up for a training camp by the Scotland under-19 national team. McBurnie was called up to the Scotland under-19 squad in November 2014. He made his debut in a 1–1 draw against the Netherlands. in April 2015 he was praised by under-19 manager Ricky Sbragia, and subsequently by club manager Phil Parkinson. He scored 1 goals in 4 appearances for the under-19s.

McBurnie moved up to the under-21 team in 2015, and he made twelve appearances at that level, scoring two goals.

=== Senior career ===
McBurnie was selected for the senior national squad for the first time in March 2018, by new Scotland manager Alex McLeish. He made his full international debut on 23 March, in a 1–0 defeat to Costa Rica. He then took part in Scotland's mini tour of Latin America (defeats to Peru and Mexico) two months later.

In March 2019, following "his breakthrough campaign for Swansea", McBurnie said he was ready to "stake a claim for a Scotland striking role".

In September 2019, McBurnie stated his commitment to the national team following a video posted on social media. His dedication to the Scotland national team was questioned again in August 2020, after he withdrew from the squad but then played in a club match. He was defended by Scotland manager Steve Clarke. McBurnie was further criticised in November 2020, and was again defended by Clarke.

In November 2020, McBurnie played in both of Scotland's UEFA Euro 2020 play-off matches (against Israel and Serbia), scoring in the penalty shoot-out win in the latter, which qualified Scotland for their first major tournament in over 20 years.

In May 2021, he was not selected to the Scotland squad for the delayed UEFA Euro 2020 tournament due to injury.

McBurnie did not receive a call-up for the following five years, until he was recalled in September 2026 by new manager Sebastien Pocognoli. He said he was "eternally grateful" to Pocognoli for recalling him.

== Personal life ==
McBurnie was a boyhood fan of Scottish football club Rangers.

In October 2019, McBurnie was charged with drink-driving. In July 2020 he was fined £28,500 and banned from driving for 16 months.

In January 2020, McBurnie was warned by the Football Association for his conduct amongst Swansea City supporters whilst attending the South Wales derby when he allegedly made a rude gesture towards Cardiff City fans.

In February 2021, McBurnie offered to pay for the funeral of a 26-year-old Swansea City fan who died.

On 10 May 2021, Sheffield United announced they would investigate a video being circulated on social media which appeared to show McBurnie involved in a fight. North Yorkshire Police said that a 24-year-old man had been arrested in connection with an incident where a 21-year-old victim sustained facial injuries. The following month, North Yorkshire Police said that the case had been concluded, with a penalty notice and caution issued to two of the men involved in the incident.

In May 2022, police announced an investigation into a video allegedly showing McBurnie 'stamping' on a fan, with McBurnie saying he was trying to step over the person. In June 2022, McBurnie and Sheffield United teammate Rhian Brewster were charged with common assault by Nottinghamshire Police "in relation to disorder at the conclusion of a game at the City Ground on 17 May 2022". Both players "strenuously denied" the allegations. The charges against Brewster were dropped in July 2022, but remained against McBurnie. In August 2022 it was announced that the case against McBurnie would proceed to trial, after he pleaded not guilty to an assault charge. On 15 December 2022, McBurnie was found not guilty of the charge.

== Career statistics ==
=== Club ===
As of match played 22 November 2026

Appearances and goals by club, season and competition
Club	Season	League			National cup (Note: Includes FA Cup, Copa del Rey)		League cup (Note: Includes Football League/EFL Cup)		Other		Total	
Club	Season	Division	Apps	Goals	Apps	Goals	Apps	Goals	Apps	Goals	Apps	Goals
Bradford City	2013–14	League One	8	0	1	0	0	0	0	0	9	0
Bradford City	2014–15	League One	7	0	1	0	2	0	1 (Note: Appearance(s) in Football League/EFL Trophy)	0	11	0
Bradford City	Total		15	0	2	0	2	0	1	0	20	0
Chester (loan)	2014–15	Conference Premier	14	5	—		—		0	0	14	5
Swansea City	2015–16	Premier League	0	0	0	0	0	0	—		0	0
Swansea City	2016–17	Premier League	5	0	0	0	1	2	—		6	2
Swansea City	2017–18	Premier League	11	0	0	0	1	0	—		12	0
Swansea City	2018–19	Championship	42	22	2	2	0	0	—		44	24
Swansea City	Total		58	22	2	2	2	2	0	0	62	26
Newport County (loan)	2015–16	League Two	3	3	0	0	—		—		3	3
Bristol Rovers (loan)	2015–16	League Two	5	0	—		—		0	0	5	0
Swansea City U21s	2016–17	—			—		—		4	5	4	5
Barnsley (loan)	2017–18	Championship	17	9	—		—		—		17	9
Sheffield United	2019–20	Premier League	36	6	2	0	2	0	—		40	6
Sheffield United	2020–21	Premier League	23	1	1	0	1	0	—		25	1
Sheffield United	2021–22	Championship	28	0	0	0	2	1	0	0	30	1
Sheffield United	2022–23	Championship	38	13	3	2	0	0	—		41	15
Sheffield United	2023–24	Premier League	21	6	1	0	1	0	—		23	6
Sheffield United	Total		146	26	7	2	6	1	0	0	159	29
Las Palmas	2024–25	La Liga	34	3	1	2	—		—		35	5
Hull City	2025–26	Championship	37	17	1	0	1	1	3 (Note: Appearances in Championship play-offs)	1	42	19
Hull City	2026–27	Premier League	11	4	0	0	0	0	0	0	11	4
Hull City	Total		48	21	1	0	1	1	3	1	53	23
Career total			341	90	13	6	11	4	8	6	372	105

=== International ===
As of match played 16 November 2026

Appearances and goals by national team and year
National team	Year	Apps	Goals
Scotland	2018	6	0
Scotland	2019	3	0
Scotland	2020	6	0
Scotland	2021	1	0
Scotland	2026	6	0
Total		22	0

== Honours ==
Swansea City U23

- Premier League Cup: 2016–17

Hull City

- EFL Championship play-offs: 2026

Individual

- EFL Championship Player of the Month: February 2018, September 2025
- Barnsley Player of the Year: 2017–18
- Hull City Player of the Year: 2025–26

== See also ==
- List of Scotland international footballers born outside Scotland
