= Anel Ahmedhodžić =

Bosnian footballer (born 1999)

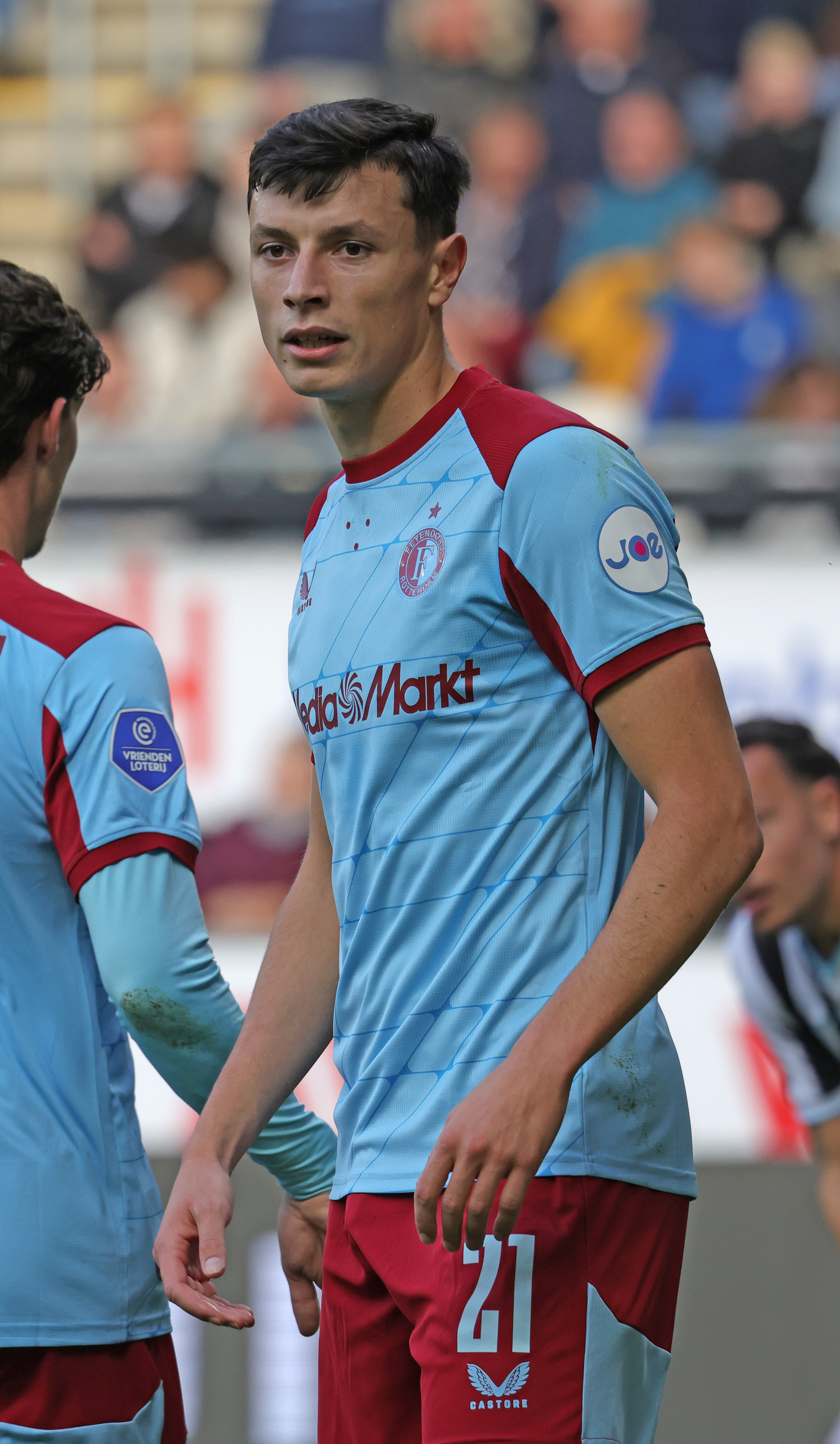
- Ahmedhodžić playing for Feyenoord in 2025

Personal information
- Date of birth: 26 March 1999 (age 27)
- Place of birth: Malmö, Sweden
- Height: 1.95 m (6 ft 5 in)
- Position: Centre-back

Team information
- Current team: Burnley
- Number: 15

Youth career
- 2004–2016: Malmö FF
- 2016: Nottingham Forest

Senior career*
Years	Team	Apps	(Gls)
2016–2019	Nottingham Forest	1	(0)
2019–2022	Malmö FF	55	(3)
2019–2020	→ Hobro IK (loan)	19	(1)
2022	→ Bordeaux (loan)	15	(0)
2022–2025	Sheffield United	103	(11)
2025–2026	Feyenoord	26	(0)
2026–	Burnley	6	(0)

International career
2014–2016	Sweden U17	24	(0)
2016–2018	Sweden U19	16	(3)
2019	Sweden U21	7	(0)
2020	Sweden	1	(0)
2020–2024	Bosnia and Herzegovina	24	(1)
- * Club domestic league appearances and goals as of 09:08, 14 October 2026 (UTC)

Anel Ahmedhodžić (pronounced [ǎnel ǎxmedxodʒitɕ]; born 26 March 1999) is a professional footballer who plays as a centre-back for EFL Championship club Burnley. Born in Sweden, he played for the Bosnia and Herzegovina national team.

Ahmedhodžić started his professional career at Nottingham Forest, before joining Malmö FF in 2019, who loaned him to Hobro IK later that year and to Bordeaux in 2022. Later that year, he moved to Sheffield United. Ahmedhodžić was transferred to Feyenoord in 2025. The following year, he signed with Burnley.

Ahmedhodžić made his senior international debut for Bosnia and Herzegovina in 2020, earning over 20 caps until 2024.

== Club career ==
=== Nottingham Forest ===
Ahmedhodžić started playing football at his hometown club Malmö FF, before joining the youth academy of English team Nottingham Forest in January 2016. He made his professional debut against Newcastle United on 30 December at the age of 17.

=== Malmö FF ===
In January 2019, Ahmedhodžić returned to Malmö FF on a contract until December 2022. He made his official debut for the squad against AIK on 30 June.

In July, he was sent on a season-long loan to Danish side Hobro IK, but was recalled in January 2020. On 21 July 2019, he scored his first professional goal against Esbjerg.

In April 2020, Ahmedhodžić signed a new three-year deal with Malmö FF. On 5 August, he scored his first goal for the team in a triumph over Helsingborgs IF. He won his first trophy with the club on 8 November, when they were crowned league champions.

Ahmedhodžić debuted in the UEFA Champions League against Juventus on 14 September 2021.

In January 2022, he was loaned to French outfit Bordeaux until the end of the season.

=== Sheffield United ===
In July, Ahmedhodžić was transferred to Sheffield United for an undisclosed fee. He made his competitive debut for the team on 6 August against Millwall. On 17 August, he scored his first goal for Sheffield United in a defeat of Sunderland.

Ahmedhodžić was an important piece in Sheffield United's promotion to the Premier League, which was sealed on 26 April.

In December, he was named club captain.

He played his 100th game for the squad against Queens Park Rangers on 1 March 2025.

=== Feyenoord ===
In August 2025, Ahmedhodžić moved to Dutch outfit Feyenoord on a four-year contract. He debuted officially for the side in a UEFA Champions League qualifier against Fenerbahçe on 6 August. A week later, he made his league debut against NAC Breda.

=== Burnley ===
In August 2026, Ahmedhodžić signed a four-year deal with Burnley.

== International career ==
After representing Sweden at all youth levels, Ahmedhodžić made his senior international debut in a friendly game against Moldova on 9 January 2020. However, in August, he decided that he would play for Bosnia and Herzegovina in the future.

In September, his request to change sports citizenship from Swedish to Bosnian was approved by FIFA. Later that month, he received his first senior call up, for the UEFA Euro 2020 qualifying play-offs against Northern Ireland and 2020–21 UEFA Nations League A matches against the Netherlands and Poland. He debuted against Northern Ireland on 8 October.

On 12 October 2021, in a 2022 FIFA World Cup qualifier against Ukraine, he scored his first senior international goal.

Technical director of the national team, Emir Spahić, announced on 13 September 2024 that Ahmedhodžić will not be called up in the future due to indiscipline, thus ending his international career.

== Personal life ==
Ahmedhodžić married his long-time girlfriend Marijana Cecillia in July 2022. Together they have two sons named Isak and Benjamin.

== Career statistics ==
=== Club ===
As of match played 13 October 2026

Appearances and goals by club, season and competition
Club	Season	League			National cup (Note: Includes Svenska Cupen, FA Cup, KNVB Cup)		League cup (Note: Includes EFL Cup)		Continental		Other		Total	
Club	Season	Division	Apps	Goals	Apps	Goals	Apps	Goals	Apps	Goals	Apps	Goals	Apps	Goals
Nottingham Forest	2016–17	Championship	1	0	0	0	0	0	—		—		1	0
Nottingham Forest	2018–19	Championship	0	0	0	0	0	0	—		—		0	0
Nottingham Forest	Total		1	0	0	0	0	0	—		—		1	0
Malmö FF	2019	Allsvenskan	1	0	2	0	—		0	0	—		3	0
Malmö FF	2020	Allsvenskan	29	2	6	0	—		6 (Note: Appearances in UEFA Europa League)	0	—		41	2
Malmö FF	2021	Allsvenskan	25	1	3	0	—		12 (Note: Appearances in UEFA Champions League)	0	—		40	1
Malmö FF	Total		55	3	11	0	—		18	0	—		84	3
Hobro IK (loan)	2019–20	Danish Superliga	19	1	0	0	—		—		—		19	1
Bordeaux (loan)	2021–22	Ligue 1	15	0	—		—		—		—		15	0
Sheffield United	2022–23	Championship	34	6	5	1	1	0	—		—		40	7
Sheffield United	2023–24	Premier League	31	2	1	0	0	0	—		—		32	2
Sheffield United	2024–25	Championship	38	3	0	0	1	0	—		3 (Note: Appearances in Championship play-offs)	0	42	3
Sheffield United	Total		103	11	6	1	2	0	—		3	0	114	12
Feyenoord	2025–26	Eredivisie	26	0	1	0	—		9 (Note: Two appearances in UEFA Champions League; seven appearances in UEFA Europa League)	0	—		36	0
Burnley	2026–27	Championship	6	0	0	0	1	0	—		—		7	0
Career total			225	15	18	1	3	0	27	0	3	0	276	16

=== International ===
Appearances and goals by national team and year
National team	Year	Apps	Goals
Sweden
Sweden	2020	1	0
Sweden	Total	1	0
Bosnia and Herzegovina
Bosnia and Herzegovina	2020	2	0
Bosnia and Herzegovina	2021	10	1
Bosnia and Herzegovina	2022	6	0
Bosnia and Herzegovina	2023	3	0
Bosnia and Herzegovina	2024	3	0
Bosnia and Herzegovina	Total	24	1
Career total		25	1

Scores and results list Bosnia and Herzegovina's goal tally first, score column indicates score after each Ahmedhodžić goal.

List of international goals scored by Anel Ahmedhodžić
No.	Date	Venue	Cap	Opponent	Score	Result	Competition
1	12 October 2021	Arena Lviv, Lviv, Ukraine	10	Ukraine	1–1	1–1	2022 FIFA World Cup qualification

== Honours ==
Malmö FF

- Allsvenskan: 2020, 2021

=== Individual ===
- Lincolnshire Blades Supporters Club Player of the Season: 2022–23
- EFL Championship Team of the Season: 2022–23
- PFA Team of the Year: Championship 2022–23
