= 2022–23 Sheffield United F.C. season =

Sheffield United
2022–23 season
- Owner: Abdullah bin Musaid Al Saud
- Chairman: Yusuf Giansiracusa
- Manager: Paul Heckingbottom
- Stadium: Bramall Lane
- Championship: 2nd (promoted)
- FA Cup: Semi-finals
- EFL Cup: First round
- Top goalscorer: League: Iliman Ndiaye (14); All: Iliman Ndiaye; Oli McBurnie (15 each)
- Highest home attendance: 30,780 (vs Preston North End, 29 April 2023)
- Lowest home attendance: 20,310 (vs Wrexham, 7 February 2023)
- Average home league attendance: 28,654
Home colours	Away colours	Third colours

The 2022–23 season was the 134th season in the existence of Sheffield United Football Club and the club's second consecutive season in the Championship. In addition to the league, they also competed in the FA Cup, the EFL Cup. On 26 April, following a 2–0 win at home against West Bromwich Albion, Sheffield United were promoted to the Premier League.

== Squad statistics ==
=== Appearances and goals ===
Updated 9 May 2023

No.	Pos	Nat	Player	Total		Championship		FA Cup		EFL Cup	
No.	Pos	Nat	Player	Apps	Goals	Apps	Goals	Apps	Goals	Apps	Goals
Goalkeepers
1	GK	(Wales) WAL	Adam Davies	10	0	6+1	0	3	0	0	0
18	GK	(England) ENG	Wes Foderingham	44	0	40	0	3	0	1	0
Defenders
2	DF	(Greece) GRE	George Baldock	40	1	33+3	1	3+1	0	0	0
3	DF	(Republic of Ireland) IRL	Enda Stevens	13	0	9+3	0	1	0	0	0
5	DF	(England) ENG	Jack O'Connell	0	0	0	0	0	0	0	0
6	DF	(England) ENG	Chris Basham	35	0	18+11	0	4+2	0	0	0
12	DF	(Republic of Ireland) IRL	John Egan	51	3	44+1	2	5	1	1	0
13	DF	(England) ENG	Max Lowe	32	1	24+2	1	2+3	0	1	0
15	DF	(Bosnia and Herzegovina) BIH	Anel Ahmedhodžić	40	7	32+2	6	5	1	1	0
19	DF	(England) ENG	Jack Robinson	32	3	25+2	3	5	0	0	0
20	DF	(England) ENG	Jayden Bogle	24	3	16+4	2	2+2	1	0	0
26	DF	(Republic of Ireland) IRL	Ciaran Clark	11	2	7+3	2	0	0	0+1	0
33	DF	(Wales) WAL	Rhys Norrington-Davies	15	0	15	0	0	0	0	0
34	DF	(England) ENG	Kyron Gordon	2	0	1	0	0	0	1	0
38	DF	(England) ENG	Jili Buyabu	1	0	0+1	0	0	0	0	0
39	DF	(England) ENG	Sai Sachdev	1	0	0+1	0	0	0	0	0
Midfielders
4	MF	(Scotland) SCO	John Fleck	29	1	14+12	1	1+1	0	1	0
8	MF	(Norway) NOR	Sander Berge	43	7	34+3	6	3+2	1	0+1	0
16	MF	(Northern Ireland) NIR	Oliver Norwood	51	3	39+7	2	3+1	1	1	0
17	MF	(Mali) MLI	Ismaila Coulibaly	6	0	0+1	0	2+3	0	0	0
22	MF	(England) ENG	Tommy Doyle	38	4	21+12	3	4	1	0+1	0
23	MF	(England) ENG	Ben Osborn	24	1	10+10	1	3	0	0+1	0
28	MF	(England) ENG	James McAtee	43	9	21+16	9	5	0	1	0
30	MF	(England) ENG	Oliver Arblaster	5	0	1+3	0	0	0	1	0
35	MF	(England) ENG	Andre Brooks	4	0	0+1	0	1+2	0	0	0
Forwards
7	FW	(England) ENG	Rhian Brewster	17	1	5+11	1	0	0	1	0
9	FW	(Scotland) SCO	Oli McBurnie	41	15	25+13	13	2+1	2	0	0
10	FW	(England) ENG	Billy Sharp	45	3	14+24	2	2+4	1	0+1	0
29	FW	(Senegal) SEN	Iliman Ndiaye	52	15	43+3	14	4+2	1	0	0
32	FW	(Denmark) DEN	William Osula	2	0	0+2	0	0	0	0	0
36	FW	(England) ENG	Daniel Jebbison	19	2	5+11	1	3	1	0	0
Player(s) out on loan:
37	GK	(Germany) GER	Jordan Amissah	1	0	0+1	0	0	0	0	0
Players who left the club:
11	MF	(Germany) GER	Reda Khadra	16	1	4+11	1	0	0	1	0

==== Goals ====
As of 9 May 2023

Rank	No.	Nat.	Po.	Name	Championship	FA Cup	EFL Cup	Total
1	29	(Senegal)	FW	Iliman Ndiaye	14	1	0	15
1	9	(Scotland)	FW	Oli McBurnie	13	2	0	15
2	28	(England)	MF	James McAtee	9	0	0	9
3	8	(Norway)	MF	Sander Berge	6	1	0	7
3	15	(Bosnia and Herzegovina)	DF	Anel Ahmedhodžić	6	1	0	7
4	22	(England)	MF	Tommy Doyle	3	1	0	4
5	19	(England)	DF	Jack Robinson	3	0	0	3
5	20	(England)	DF	Jayden Bogle	2	1	0	3
5	16	(Northern Ireland)	MF	Oliver Norwood	2	1	0	3
5	12	(Republic of Ireland)	DF	John Egan	2	1	0	3
5	10	(England)	FW	Billy Sharp	2	1	0	3
6	36	(England)	FW	Daniel Jebbison	1	1	0	2
6	26	(Republic of Ireland)	DF	Ciaran Clark	2	0	0	2
7	13	(England)	DF	Max Lowe	1	0	0	1
7	11	(Germany)	MF	Reda Khadra	1	0	0	1
7	7	(England)	FW	Rhian Brewster	1	0	0	1
7	23	(England)	MF	Ben Osborn	1	0	0	1
7	2	(Greece)	DF	George Baldock	1	0	0	1
7	4	(Scotland)	MF	John Fleck	1	0	0	1
Own goals					2	1	0	3
Total					73	12	0	85

== Transfers ==
=== Transfers in ===
Date	Pos	Player	Transferred from	Fee	Ref
6 July 2022	CB	(Bosnia and Herzegovina) Anel Ahmedhodžić	(Sweden) Malmö	Undisclosed	

=== Loans in ===
Date	Pos	Player	Loaned from	On loan until	Ref
4 July 2022	MF	(England) Tommy Doyle	(England) Manchester City	End of Season	
13 July 2022	CB	(Republic of Ireland) Ciaran Clark	(England) Newcastle United	End of Season	
26 July 2022	AM	(Germany) Reda Khadra	(England) Brighton & Hove Albion	10 January 2023 (Note: On 10 January, Khadra was recalled to Brighton)	
4 August 2022	AM	(England) James McAtee	(England) Manchester City	End of Season	

=== Transfers out ===
Date	Pos	Player	Transferred to	Fee	Ref
13 June 2022	GK	(Netherlands) Michael Verrips	(Netherlands) Fortuna Sittard	Free Transfer	
29 June 2022	CF	(Scotland) Oliver Burke	(Germany) Werder Bremen	Undisclosed	
30 June 2022	DF	(England) Beau Anderson	Unattached	Released	
30 June 2022	FW	(England) Tyrese Bailey-Green	Unattached	Released	
30 June 2022	FW	(Belize) Angelo Cappello	(England) Halifax Town	Released	
30 June 2022	DF	(Republic of Ireland) Harvey Cullinan	Unattached	Released	
30 June 2022	AM	(England) Luke Freeman	(England) Luton Town	Released	
30 June 2022	CF	(Republic of Ireland) David McGoldrick	(England) Derby County	Released	
30 June 2022	CF	(France) Lys Mousset	(Germany) VfL Bochum	Released	
30 June 2022	MF	(England) Ethan Slater	Unattached	Released	
31 August 2022	FW	(England) Will Lankshear	(England) Tottenham Hotspur	Undisclosed	
1 September 2022	DF	(Poland) Kacper Łopata	(England) Southend United	Undisclosed	
11 February 2023	CF	(Albania) Leonardo Gaxha	(Republic of Ireland) Kerry	Free Transfer	

=== Loans out ===
Date	Pos	Player	Loaned to	On loan until	Ref
27 June 2022	DF	(England) Harry Boyes	(England) Forest Green Rovers	2 January 2023 (Note: On 2 January, Boyes was recalled from his loan at Forest Green)	
5 July 2022	GK	(England) Jake Eastwood	(Scotland) Ross County	6 January 2023 (Note: On 6 January, Eastwood was recalled from his loan with Ross County)	
12 July 2022	GK	(England) Marcus Dewhurst	(England) Scunthorpe United	12 January 2023 (Note: On 12 January, Dewhurst returned from his loan spell at Scunthorpe early)	
12 July 2022	MF	(England) Harrison Neal	(England) Barrow	End of Season	
15 July 2022	RB	(England) Femi Seriki	(England) Rochdale	End of Season	
16 July 2022	CB	(France) Jean Belehouan	(England) Boston United	1 January 2023	
25 July 2022	MF	(England) Zak Brunt	(England) Boreham Wood	End of Season	
1 September 2022	CF	(Denmark) William Osula	(England) Derby County	4 January 2023 (Note: On 4 January, Osula was recalled from his loan at Derby)	
23 September 2022	CM	(England) George Broadbent	(England) Boreham Wood	1 January 2023	
22 October 2022	RB	(England) Joe Starbuck	(England) Kidderminster Harriers	22 November 2022	
7 December 2022	RB	(England) Joe Starbuck	(England) Boston United	7 January 2023	
6 January 2023	GK	(Germany) Jordan Amissah	(England) Burton Albion	End of Season	
6 January 2023	LB	(England) Harry Boyes	(England) Lincoln City	End of Season	
12 January 2023	GK	(England) Jake Eastwood	(England) Rochdale	End of Season	
31 January 2023	CB	(France) Nicksoen Gomis	(Belgium) Beerschot	End of Season	
17 February 2023	CB	(England) Finley Potter	(England) Barnet	End of Season	

== Pre-season and friendlies ==
On June 1, Sheffield United announced their pre-season plans, along with a training camp in Lisbon. During the Blades time in Portugal they confirmed they would face Casa Pia. A behind-closed-doors meeting with Mansfield Town was later added to the schedule.

Win Draw Loss Fixtures

8 July 2022 Friendly	Casa Pia	1–2	Sheffield United	Lisbon, Portugal
18:00 WEST	Godwin 4'	Report	Berge 32'; Jebbison 63'	Stadium: Estádio Pina Manique

12 July 2022 Friendly	Sheffield United	6–0	Lincoln City	Shirecliffe
11:00 BST	Osula 5', 11'; Osborn 67'; Berge 81'; Brewster 98', 104'	Report		Stadium: Shirecliffe; Attendance: 0 (Behind closed doors)

16 July 2022 Friendly	Scunthorpe United	3–2	Sheffield United	Scunthorpe
12:30 BST	Daniel 21', 40'; Beestin 33'	Report	Brewster 74'; Ndiaye 79'	Stadium: Glanford Park

19 July 2022 Friendly	Mansfield Town	3–0	Sheffield United	Mansfield
19:00 BST	Boateng 65', 80'; Oates 71'	Report		Stadium: One Call Stadium; Attendance: 0 (behind-closed-doors); Referee: Declan Bourne

22 July 2022 Friendly	Burton Albion	0–3	Sheffield United	Burton upon Trent
19:30 BST		Report	Jebbison 31', 40'; Stevens 63'	Stadium: Pirelli Stadium; Attendance: 1,524; Referee: James Beard

23 July 2022 Friendly	Barnsley	2–1	Sheffield United	Barnsley
15:00 BST	Aitchison 57'; Benson 81'	Report	Cundy 45+1' (o.g.)	Stadium: Oakwell

== Competitions ==
=== Overall record ===
Competition	First match	Last match	Starting round	Record							
Competition	First match	Last match	Starting round	Pld	W	D	L	GF	GA	GD	Win %
Championship	1 August 2022	8 May 2023	Matchday 1	46	28	7	11	73	39	+34	60.87
FA Cup	7 January 2023	22 April 2023	Third round	6	4	1	1	12	9	+3	66.67
EFL Cup	11 August 2022	11 August 2022	First round	1	0	0	1	0	1	−1	0.00
Total				53	32	8	13	85	49	+36	60.38

Last updated: pre-season
Source: [ Soccerway]

=== Championship ===
==== League table ====
Pos	Team	Pld	W	D	L	GF	GA	GD	Pts	Promotion, qualification or relegation
1	Burnley (C, P)	46	29	14	3	87	35	+52	101	Promotion to Premier League
2	Sheffield United (P)	46	28	7	11	73	39	+34	91	Promotion to Premier League
3	Luton Town (O, P)	46	21	17	8	57	39	+18	80	Qualification for Championship play-offs
4	Middlesbrough	46	22	9	15	84	56	+28	75	Qualification for Championship play-offs
5	Coventry City	46	18	16	12	58	46	+12	70	Qualification for Championship play-offs
6	Sunderland	46	18	15	13	68	55	+13	69	Qualification for Championship play-offs

Source: EFL Official Website
Rules for classification: 1) Points; 2) Goal difference; 3) Number of goals scored; 4) Head-to-head results; 5) Wins; 6) Away goals; 7) Penalty points (sec 9.5); 8) 12-point sending off offences
(C) Champions; (O) Play-off winners; (P) Promoted

==== Results summary ====
Overall								Home						Away					
Pld	W	D	L	GF	GA	GD	Pts	W	D	L	GF	GA	GD	W	D	L	GF	GA	GD
46	28	7	11	73	39	+34	91	16	3	4	47	19	+28	12	4	7	26	20	+6

Last updated: 4 May 2023.
Source: [ Soccerway]

==== Results by round ====
Round	1	2	3	4	5	6	7	8	9	10	11	12	13	14	15	16	17	18	19	20	21	22	23	24	25	26	27	28	29	30	31	32	33	34	35	36	37	38	39	40	41	42	43	44	45	46
Ground	A	H	A	H	H	A	H	A	A	A	H	H	A	H	A	H	A	A	H	H	A	H	A	H	A	A	H	H	A	H	H	A	H	A	A	H	A	A	H	A	H	H	H	H	A	A
Result	L	W	D	W	W	D	W	W	W	W	D	L	L	D	L	D	W	W	W	L	W	W	W	W	W	D	W	W	D	W	L	L	W	L	W	L	W	W	W	L	W	W	W	W	L	W
Position	23	7	9	4	1	2	1	1	1	1	1	1	1	2	4	5	4	3	3	3	2	2	2	2	2	2	2	2	2	2	2	2	2	2	2	2	2	2	2	2	2	2	2	2	2	2

Updated to match(es) played on 4 May 2023. Source: [ Soccerway]
A = Away; H = Home; W = Win; D = Draw; L = Loss; P = Postponed

==== Matches ====
Win Draw Loss Fixtures

On 23 June, the league fixtures were announced.

1 August 2022 1	Watford	1–0	Sheffield United	Watford
20:00 BST	Sierralta (yellow card) 25'; Cleverley (yellow card) 45+2'; Pedro (yellow card) 49', (goal) 56'; Kamara (yellow card) 90+5'	Report	Clark (yellow card) 14'; Fleck (yellow card) 24'; Berge (yellow card) 90+2'	Stadium: Vicarage Road; Attendance: 19,536; Referee: Josh Smith

6 August 2022 2	Sheffield United	2–0	Millwall	Sheffield
15:00 BST	Ndiaye 7'; Berge 22'; Clark (yellow card) 82'; Norrington-Davies (yellow card) 90+3'; Foderingham (yellow card) 90+4'	Report	Bennett (yellow card) 45'; McNamara (yellow card) 90+3'	Stadium: Bramall Lane; Attendance: 27,738; Referee: David Coote

14 August 2022 3	Middlesbrough	2–2	Sheffield United	Middlesbrough
14:00 BST	McGree (yellow card) 11'; Akpom 14', 82'; Fry (yellow card) 45+1'	Report	Berge 2'; Sharp (yellow card) 11'; Norrington-Davies (yellow card) 19'; Giles 68' (o.g.); Fleck (yellow card) 90+1'	Stadium: Riverside Stadium; Attendance: 26,056; Referee: Andre Marriner

17 August 2022 4	Sheffield United	2–1	Sunderland	Sheffield
20:00 BST	Ahmedhodžić 33'; Lowe 47'; McBurnie (yellow card) 90+4'	Report	Neil (red card) 31'; Gooch 55', (yellow card) 72'; O'Nien (yellow card) 64'; Matete (yellow card) 90+4'; Wright (yellow card) 90+7'	Stadium: Bramall Lane; Attendance: 28,197; Referee: James Linington

20 August 2022 5	Sheffield United	3–0	Blackburn Rovers	Sheffield
15:00 BST	Norwood 31'; Lowe (yellow card) 41'; Ahmedhodžić (yellow card) 51'; Ndiaye 73', 79', (yellow card) 79'	Report	Gallagher (yellow card) 51'; Brereton Díaz (yellow card) 56'	Stadium: Bramall Lane; Attendance: 27,850; Referee: Leigh Doughty

26 August 2022 6	Luton Town	1–1	Sheffield United	Luton
20:00 BST	Morris 10'	Report	Baldock (yellow card) 15'; McAtee (yellow card) 23'; McBurnie 53', (yellow card) 54'; Ndiaye (yellow card) 73'	Stadium: Kenilworth Road; Attendance: 9,882; Referee: David Webb

30 August 2022 7	Sheffield United	4–0	Reading	Sheffield
19:45 BST	McBurnie 11'; Ahmedhodžić 46', 81'; Ndiaye 62'	Report		Stadium: Bramall Lane; Attendance: 27,810; Referee: Gavin Ward

4 September 2022 8	Hull City	0–2	Sheffield United	Kingston upon Hull
15:00 BST	Figueiredo (yellow card) 90+8'	Report	McBurnie 20'; Ahmedhodžić (yellow card) 58'; Berge 75'; Brewster (yellow card) 90+8'	Stadium: MKM Stadium; Attendance: 20,426; Referee: Matt Donohue

13 September 2022 9	Swansea City	0–1	Sheffield United	Landore
19:45 BST	Grimes (yellow card) 63'	Report	Ahmedhodžić (yellow card) 47'; Khadra 90+4'	Stadium: Swansea.com Stadium; Attendance: 15,458; Referee: Darren Bond

17 September 2022 10	Preston North End	0–2	Sheffield United	Preston
15:00 BST	Lindsay (yellow card) 15'	Report	Ndiaye 40'; Egan (yellow card) 73'; McBurnie 75', (yellow card) 76'; Norwood (yellow card) 90+3'	Stadium: Deepdale; Attendance: 18,412; Referee: Jeremy Simpson

1 October 2022 11	Sheffield United	1–1	Birmingham City	Sheffield
15:00 BST	McBurnie (yellow card) 52' (goal) 64'; Norwood (yellow card) 76'; Bogle (yellow card) 90+3'	Report	Longelo (yellow card) 21'; Bielik (yellow card) 52'; Deeney 70'; Mejbri (yellow card) 85'	Stadium: Bramall Lane; Attendance: 29,927; Referee: Darren Bond

4 October 2022 12	Sheffield United	0–1	Queens Park Rangers	Sheffield
19:45 BST	Egan (yellow card) 22'	Report	Willock 51'; Balogun (yellow card) 76'; Dunne (yellow card) 82'	Stadium: Bramall Lane; Attendance: 26,636; Referee: James Linington

8 October 2022 13	Stoke City	3–1	Sheffield United	Stoke-on-Trent
15:00 BST	Wilmot 4' (yellow card) 86'; Jagielka 45+4'; Fosu (yellow card) 61'; Delap 90+1'; Campbell (yellow card) 90+3'	Report	Brewster 28'; Norrington-Davies (yellow card) 90+5'	Stadium: Bet365 Stadium; Attendance: 22,008; Referee: Peter Bankes

15 October 2022 14	Sheffield United	3–3	Blackpool	Sheffield
15:00 BST	McAtee 8' (yellow card) 45+1'; Ndiaye 24'; Baldock (yellow card) 56'; Ahmedhodžić (yellow card) 72'; Norwood (yellow card) 72' (goal) 90+8'; Doyle (yellow card) 77'; Brewster (penalty missed) 88'; Foderingham (red card) 90+9'	Report	Yates 30' 42'; Dougall 50'; Ekpiteta (yellow card) 55' (yellow-red card) 78'; Thompson (yellow card) 66' (yellow-red card) 81'	Stadium: Bramall Lane; Attendance: 28,458; Referee: David Webb

19 October 2022 15	Coventry City	1–0	Sheffield United	Coventry
19:45 BST	Sheaf (yellow card) 40'; Dabo (yellow card) 42'; Bidwell (yellow card) 58'; McFadzean (yellow card) 76'; Waghorn 87' (pen.)	Report	McAtee (yellow card) 38'	Stadium: The Coventry Building Society Arena; Attendance: 17,913; Referee: Keith Stroud

22 October 2022 16	Sheffield United	2–2	Norwich City	Sheffield
15:00 BST	Sharp (yellow card) 57'; Osborn 62'; McBurnie 71'	Report	Pukki 3' 16' (penalty missed) 88'; Hayden (yellow card) 45+3'; Cantwell (yellow card) 45+4'; Hanley (yellow card) 53'; Giannoulis (yellow card) 70'; Gibbs (yellow card) 79'	Stadium: Bramall Lane; Attendance: 30,035; Referee: Josh Smith

29 October 2022 17	West Bromwich Albion	0–2	Sheffield United	West Bromwich
12:30 BST		Report	Ndiaye 11'; McBurnie 23'; Ahmedhodžić (yellow card) 38'	Stadium: The Hawthorns; Attendance: 22,270; Referee: Dean Whitestone

1 November 2022 18	Bristol City	0–1	Sheffield United	Ashton Gate
20:00 BST	Scott (yellow card) 40'; James (yellow card) 51'; Tanner (red card) 90+6'; Williams (yellow card) 90+7'	Report	Ndiaye 49' (yellow card) 70'; McAtee (yellow card) 62'; Egan (yellow card) 81'; Clark (yellow card) 86'; Baldock (yellow card) 90+7'	Stadium: Ashton Gate; Attendance: 17,437; Referee: Stephen Martin

5 November 2022 19	Sheffield United	5–2	Burnley	Sheffield
12:30 GMT	Stevens (yellow card) 26'; Ndiaye 30'; McBurnie 48', 74' (yellow card) 77'; Robinson 64'; Ahmedhodžić 69'	Report	Benson 17', 45'; Cullen (yellow card) 53'; Tella (yellow card) 77'; Cork (yellow card) 80'	Stadium: Bramall Lane; Attendance: 28,924; Referee: Darren Bond

8 November 2022 20	Sheffield United	0–1	Rotherham United	Sheffield
19:45 GMT	Sharp (yellow card) 71'; Norwood (yellow card) 90+5'	Report	Wiles 38'; Peltier (yellow card) 44'; Johansson (yellow card) 45'; Harding (yellow card) 45+2'	Stadium: Bramall Lane; Attendance: 30,700; Referee: Keith Stroud

12 November 2022 21	Cardiff City	0–1	Sheffield United	Leckwith
15:00 GMT		Report	Baldock 64'; Stevens (yellow card) 79'	Stadium: Cardiff City Stadium; Attendance: 18,700; Referee: Matt Donohue

10 December 2022 22	Sheffield United	1–0	Huddersfield Town	Sheffield
15:00 GMT	Sharp 15'; Baldock (yellow card) 73'; Ahmedhodžić (yellow card) 83'	Report	Thomas (yellow card) 31'; Hogg (yellow card) 59'	Stadium: Bramall Lane; Attendance: 27,794; Referee: Darren Bond

19 December 2022 23	Wigan Athletic	1–2	Sheffield United	Wigan
20:00 GMT	Tilt (yellow card) 15'; Broadhead 65'	Report	Egan 8', (yellow card) 40'; Sharp (yellow card) 15', (goal) 56'; Clark (yellow card) 67'	Stadium: DW Stadium; Attendance: 11,556; Referee: Dean Whitestone

26 December 2022 24	Sheffield United	3–1	Coventry City	Sheffield
15:00 GMT	McAtee 35'; Egan (yellow card) 41' (yellow-red card) 77'; Clark 52'; Doyle 71'	Report	Sheaf (yellow card) 24'; Gyökeres (penalty missed) 48', 75'; Bidwell (yellow card) 60'; Palmer (yellow card) 68'	Stadium: Bramall Lane; Attendance: 29,651; Referee: Matt Donohue

29 December 2022 25	Blackpool	1–2	Sheffield United	Blackpool
20:15 GMT	Ekpiteta 55'	Report	Berge 18'; McAtee 49'	Stadium: Bloomfield Road; Attendance: 14,395; Referee: Peter Bankes

2 January 2023 26	Queens Park Rangers	1–1	Sheffield United	Shepherd's Bush
20:00 GMT	Chair 11'; Field (yellow card) 57'; Dunne (yellow card) 86'	Report	Foderingham (yellow card) 39'; Jebbison (yellow card) 90+2'; Egan 90+6'	Stadium: Loftus Road Stadium; Attendance: 14,151; Referee: Josh Smith

14 January 2023 27	Sheffield United	3–1	Stoke City	Sheffield
15:00 GMT	Ndiaye 9'; Bogle 33', (yellow card) 61', (goal) 90'; Egan (yellow card) 63'	Report	Powell 45+1'; Laurent (yellow card) 56'; Souttar (yellow card) 90+3'	Stadium: Bramall Lane; Attendance: 29,644; Referee: Michael Salisbury

20 January 2023 28	Sheffield United	1–0	Hull City	Sheffield
19:45 GMT	Jebbison 4'; Ahmedhodžić (yellow card) 11'; Doyle (yellow card) 20'; Norwood (yellow card) 35'; Robinson (yellow card) 83'; McBurnie (yellow card) 85'; Bogle (yellow card) 90'	Report	Estupiñán (yellow card) 58'; Tetteh (red card) 84'; Connolly (yellow card) 90+1'	Stadium: Bramall Lane; Attendance: 29,271; Referee: Darren Bond

4 February 2023 29	Rotherham United	0–0	Sheffield United	Rotherham
12:30 GMT	Rathbone (yellow card) 78'	Report	Ahmedhodžić (yellow card) 56'	Stadium: AESSEAL New York Stadium; Attendance: 11,485; Referee: Graham Scott

11 February 2023 30	Sheffield United	3–0	Swansea City	Sheffield
15:00 GMT	Berge 21'; Robinson 45', (yellow card) 87'; McAtee (yellow card) 54'; McBurnie 89'	Report	Cabango (yellow card) 56'; Wood (yellow card) 81'; Fulton (yellow card) 88'	Stadium: Bramall Lane; Attendance: 27,800; Referee: Matt Donohue

15 February 2023 31	Sheffield United	1–3	Middlesbrough	Sheffield
20:00 GMT	McBurnie 5', (yellow card) 74'; Ahmedhodžić (yellow card) 63'; Bogle (yellow card) 86'	Report	Smith (yellow card) 14'; Akpom 25'; Archer 48', 74'; Howson (yellow card) 57'; Crooks (yellow card) 90+3'	Stadium: Bramall Lane; Attendance: 29,084; Referee: Andre Marriner

18 February 2023 32	Millwall	3–2	Sheffield United	Bermondsey
12:30 GMT	Bradshaw 6', 63', 88'; Flemming (yellow card) 45+1'; Cooper (yellow card) 59'; Honeyman (yellow card) 90+5'	Report	Doyle 39'; Berge (yellow card) 45+2'; McBurnie (yellow card) 76'; Bogle (yellow card) 78'; McAtee 82'; Robinson (yellow card) 90+2'	Stadium: The Den; Attendance: 15,571; Referee: Stephen Martin

25 February 2023 33	Sheffield United	1–0	Watford	Sheffield
15:00 GMT	Ahmedhodžić (yellow card) 17'; Lowe (yellow card) 34'; Porteous 73' (o.g.)	Report	Hoedt (yellow card) 12'; Porteous (yellow card) 51'; Koné (yellow card) 70'	Stadium: Bramall Lane; Attendance: 29,132; Referee: Keith Stroud

5 March 2023 34	Blackburn Rovers	1–0	Sheffield United	Blackburn
12:30 GMT	Pickering 5'; Szmodics (yellow card) 71'; Gallagher (yellow card) 77'	Report	Basham (yellow card) 48'; Norwood (yellow card) 67'; Egan (yellow card) 89'	Stadium: Ewood Park; Attendance: 16,464; Referee: Josh Smith

7 March 2023 35	Reading	0–1	Sheffield United	Reading
20:00 GMT	Yiadom (yellow card) 40'; Ince (yellow card) 45+2'	Report	Ndiaye 60'	Stadium: Select Car Leasing Stadium; Attendance: 9,897; Referee: Dean Whitestone

11 March 2023 36	Sheffield United	0–1	Luton Town	Sheffield
15:00 GMT	Bogle (yellow card) 23'; Lowe (yellow card) 90+5'	Report	Morris 53'	Stadium: Bramall Lane; Attendance: 28,006; Referee: Leigh Doughty

15 March 2023 37	Sunderland	1–2	Sheffield United	Sunderland
20:00 GMT	Hume (yellow card) 27'; Michut 30', (yellow card) 71'; Ballard (yellow card) 90+5'	Report	Robinson (yellow card) 20'; Lowe (yellow card) 24'; Doyle (yellow card) 35', (goal) 61'; McAtee 45+1'; Ahmedhodźić (yellow card) 55'	Stadium: Stadium of Light; Attendance: 37,490; Referee: Matt Donohue

1 April 2023 38	Norwich City	0–1	Sheffield United	Norwich
15:00 BST	Aarons (yellow card) 32'; Sara (yellow card) 34'; McLean (yellow card) 90+5'	Report	Baldock (yellow card) 32'; Berge (yellow card) 50'; McAtee 62'; Ndiaye (yellow card) 90+5'	Stadium: Carrow Road; Attendance: 26,801; Referee: Darren Bond

7 April 2023 39	Sheffield United	1–0	Wigan Athletic	Sheffield
15:00 BST	Ndiaye 8'; Fleck (yellow card) 86'; Ahmedhodžić (yellow card) 90+3'	Report	Tiéhi (yellow card) 39'	Stadium: Bramall Lane; Attendance: 29,026; Referee: Andy Davies

10 April 2023 40	Burnley	2–0	Sheffield United	Burnley
20:00 BST	Harwood-Bellis (yellow card) 10'; Guðmundsson 60', 70'	Report	Foderingham (red card) 17'; Egan (yellow card) 28'; Bogle (yellow card) 59'; Ndiaye (yellow card) 72'	Stadium: Turf Moor; Attendance: 21,506; Referee: Michael Salisbury

15 April 2023 41	Sheffield United	4–1	Cardiff City	Sheffield
12:30 BST	Lowe (yellow card) 17'; McAtee 24'; Berge (yellow card) 38'; Robinson 54'; Baldock (yellow card) 57'; Ndiaye 80'; Clark 85'	Report	Simpson (yellow card) 4'; Kaba 19' (pen.); O'Dowda (yellow card) 52'	Stadium: Bramall Lane; Attendance: 27,768; Referee: David Webb

18 April 2023 42	Sheffield United	1–0	Bristol City	Sheffield
19:45 BST	McAtee 77'; Baldock (yellow card) 90+3'	Report	Pring (yellow card) 54'; Cornick (yellow card) 60'; O'Dowda (yellow card) 52'	Stadium: Bramall Lane; Attendance: 26,476; Referee: Geoff Eltringham

26 April 2023 43	Sheffield United	2–0	West Bromwich Albion	Sheffield
20:00 BST	Berge 58'; Ahmedhodžić 76'; Egan (yellow card) 84'	Report	Pieters (yellow card) 26'	Stadium: Bramall Lane; Attendance: 30,050; Referee: Dean Whitestone

29 April 2023 44	Sheffield United	4–1	Preston North End	Sheffield
15:00 BST	Ahmedhodžić 36'; Fleck 72'; Ndiaye 75', (yellow card) 76'; McBurnie 90+5', (yellow card) 90+6'	Report	Parrott (yellow card) 59'; Delap 63'	Stadium: Bramall Lane; Attendance: 30,780; Referee: Stephen Martin

4 May 2023 45	Huddersfield Town	1–0	Sheffield United	Huddersfield
19:45 BST	Ward 59'; Rudoni (yellow card) 85'	Report	Egan (yellow card) 22'; Doyle (yellow card) 90+1'	Stadium: John Smith's Stadium; Attendance: 20,172; Referee: John Busby

8 May 2023 46	Birmingham City	1–2	Sheffield United	Birmingham
15:00 BST	Dean (yellow card) 71'; Sanderson 79'	Report	McBurnie 53'; McAtee 56'	Stadium: St Andrew's; Attendance: 18,853; Referee: David Webb

=== FA Cup ===
The Blades were drawn away to Millwall in the third round and to Wrexham in the fourth round.

Win Draw Loss Fixtures

7 January 2023 Third round	Millwall	0–2	Sheffield United	Bermondsey
15:00 GMT	McNamara (yellow card) 18'	Report	Jebbison 23'; Bogle 36', (yellow card) 72'	Stadium: The Den; Attendance: 7,268; Referee: John Brooks

29 January 2023 Fourth round	Wrexham	3–3	Sheffield United	Wrexham
16:30 GMT	Jones 50'; Young (yellow card) 56'; O'Connor 61'; McFadzean (yellow card) 64'; Tozer (yellow card) 71'; Mullin 86'	Report	McBurnie 2'; Egan (yellow card) 45+7', (goal) 90+5'; Norwood 65'; Jebbison (red card) 71'; Bogle (yellow card) 90+1'	Stadium: Racecourse Ground; Attendance: 9,949; Referee: Dean Whitestone

7 February 2023 Fourth round replay	Sheffield United	3–1	Wrexham	Sheffield
19:45 GMT	Coulibaly (yellow card) 45+2'; Ahmedhodžić 50'; Egan (yellow card) 75'; Berge (yellow card) 90+3', (goal) 90+6'; Sharp 90+4'	Report	Mullin 59' (pen.), (penalty missed) 72'	Stadium: Bramall Lane; Attendance: 20,310; Referee: Leigh Doughty

1 March 2023 Fifth round	Sheffield United	1–0	Tottenham Hotspur	Sheffield
19:55 GMT	Baldock (yellow card) 47'; Ndiaye 79'; Lowe (yellow card) 85'	Report	Sarr (yellow card) 56'	Stadium: Bramall Lane; Attendance: 28,308; Referee: John Brooks

19 March 2023 Quarter-finals	Sheffield United	3–2	Blackburn Rovers	Sheffield
12:00 GMT	Robinson (yellow card) 21'; Gallagher 28' (o.g.); McBurnie 81'; Doyle 90+1'	Report	Brereton Díaz 21' (pen.); Szmodics 60'; Carter (yellow card) 62'	Stadium: Bramall Lane; Attendance: 25,814; Referee: Tim Robinson

22 April 2023 Semi-finals	Manchester City	3–0	Sheffield United	Wembley
16:45 BST	Mahrez 43' (pen.), 61', 66'	Report	Norwood (yellow card) 74'	Stadium: Wembley Stadium; Attendance: 69,603; Referee: Stuart Attwell

=== EFL Cup ===
Win Draw Loss Fixtures

Sheffield United were drawn away to West Bromwich Albion in the first round.

11 August 2022 First round	West Bromwich Albion	1–0	Sheffield United	West Bromwich
20:00 BST	Grant 73'	Report		Stadium: The Hawthorns; Attendance: 6,747; Referee: David Webb
