= Westfield =

Westfield may refer to:

== Places ==
=== Australia ===
- Westfield, Western Australia

=== Canada ===
- Grand Bay-Westfield, New Brunswick
- Westfield, Nova Scotia

=== New Zealand ===
- Westfield, New Zealand

=== United Kingdom ===
==== England ====
- Westfield, Cumbria, a location
- Westfield, East Sussex
- Westfield, Hampshire, a location
- Westfield, Herefordshire, a location
- Westfield, Norfolk
- Westfield, Redcar, North Yorkshire
- Westfield, York, North Yorkshire
- Westfield, Somerset
- Westfield, Sheffield, South Yorkshire
- Westfield, Woking, Surrey
- Westfield, Bradford, West Yorkshire
- Westfield, Kirklees, a location in West Yorkshire

==== Scotland ====
- Westfield, Angus, a location
- Westfield, Highland
- Westfield, Cumbernauld, North Lanarkshire
- Westfield, West Lothian

=== United States ===
- Westfield, Alabama, former settlement near Fairfield, Alabama
- Westfield, Illinois
- Westfield, Indiana, a city in Hamilton County
- Westfield, Iowa
- Westfield, Maine
- Westfield, Massachusetts
- Westfield, New Jersey
- Westfield, New York, a town
- Westfield (village), New York
- Westfield, Staten Island, a former town
- Westfield, North Carolina, in Surry County
- Westfield, Pennsylvania
- Westfield, Texas
- Westfield, Vermont
- Westfield, West Virginia
- Westfield, Wisconsin, a village
- Westfield, Marquette County, Wisconsin, a town
- Westfield, Sauk County, Wisconsin, a town
- Westfield Center, Ohio
- Westfield Corners, Illinois
- Westfield River, in Massachusetts
- Westfield Township (disambiguation)

== Education ==
- Westfield College, a former constituent college of the University of London
- Westfield State University, a public university in Westfield, Massachusetts
- Westfield School (disambiguation), several schools
- Westfield High School (disambiguation), several schools in the United States

== Sports ==
- Westfield F.C. (Surrey), football club in Woking, Surrey
- Westfield F.C. (Sussex), football club in Westfield, East Sussex
- Westfield Sydney to Melbourne Ultramarathon, a former marathon race

== Other uses ==
- Westfield Group, a retail property group that owned shopping centres in several countries; formed in 1960 and split in 2014
  - Scentre Group, formed in a corporate spin-off in 2014, operating Australian and New Zealand shopping centres
  - Westfield Corporation, formed in a corporate spin-off in 2014 and defunct in 2018
  - Unibail-Rodamco-Westfield, formed in a corporate merger in 2018
    - Westfield London, a shopping centre in White City, London, England
    - Westfield Stratford City, a shopping centre near the Olympic Park in Stratford, London, England
- Westfield (surname)
- Westfield (guitars), a Scottish-based guitar company, started in 1989
- Westfield Health, a health insurance company based in the UK
- Westfield Insurance
- Westfield Sportscars
- USS Westfield (1861), a sidewheel steam ferryboat during the American Civil War
- "Westfield", a song by Bladee from Red Light
- Westfield, Beverley, historic building in the East Riding of Yorkshire, in England
