= Bramall Lane =

Football stadium in Sheffield, England

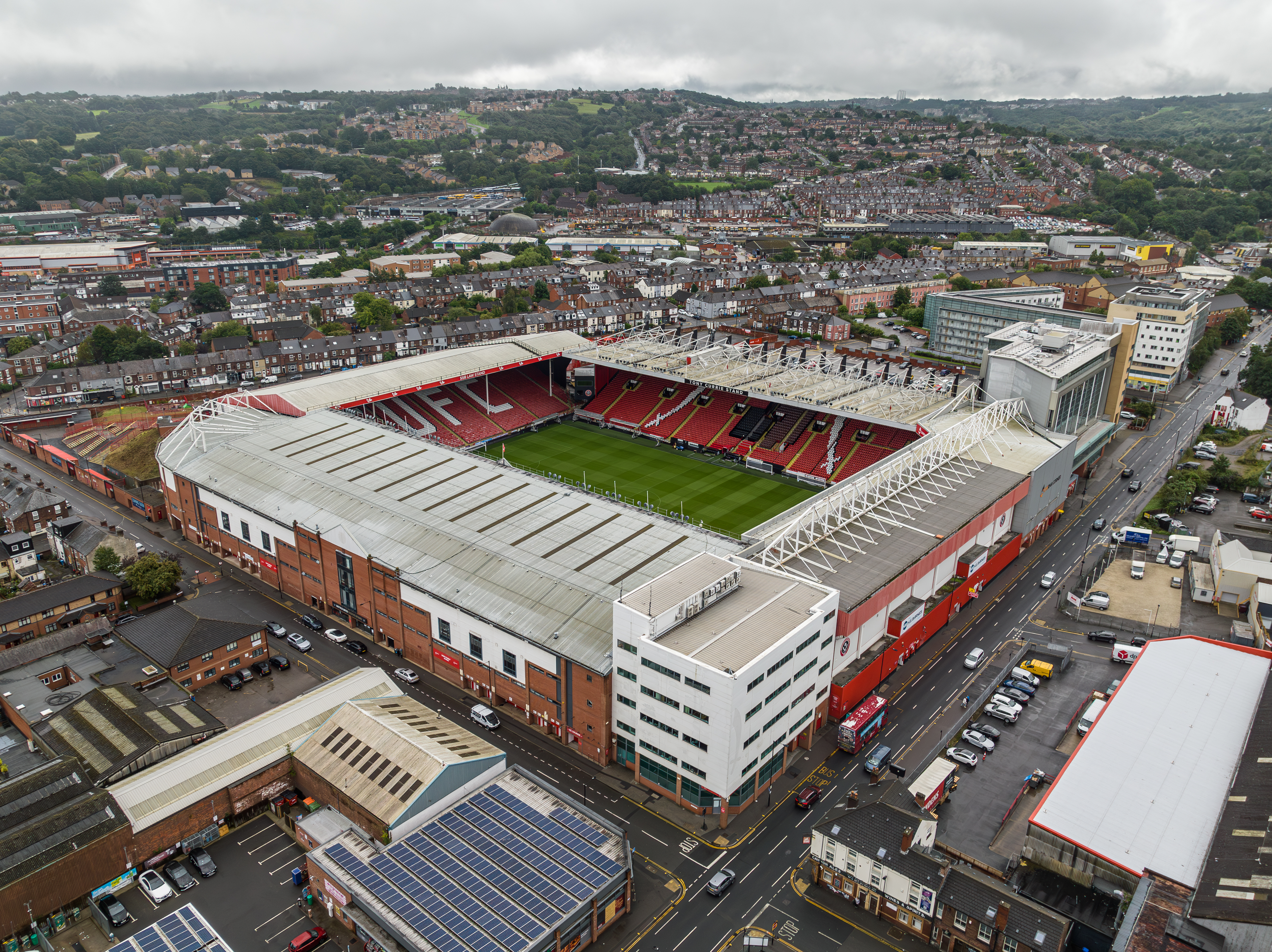
- Bramall Lane in 2023
- Interactive map of Bramall Lane
- Full name: Bramall Lane Stadium
- Location: Highfield, Sheffield; England; S2 4SU
- Coordinates: 53°22′13″N 1°28′15″W
- Owner: Sheffield United
- Capacity: 32,050
- Surface: Desso GrassMaster
- Field size: 101 by 68 metres (110.5 by 74.4 yd)
- Public transit: Sheffield; B P Granville Road or Park Grange Croft

Construction
- Groundbreaking: 1855
- Opened: 30 April 1855
- Renovated: 1966 (Bramall Lane Stand built); 1975 (South Stand built); 1991 (Kop seated); 1994 (all-seated); 1996 (John St Stand rebuilt); 2006 (concourses in Bramall Lane Stand redeveloped)
- Expanded: 2001 (Kop Corner built); 2006 (Westfield Health Stand built)
- Architect: (John St Stand) Ward McHugh Associates

Tenants
- Yorkshire CCC (1855–1973); Sheffield F.C. (1873–1884); The Wednesday Cricket Club (1880–1887); Sheffield United (1889–present)

Ground information
- Country: England

International information
- Only men's Test: 3 July 1902: England v Australia
- As of 1 January 2017; Source: Cricinfo

Bramall Lane is a football stadium in Sheffield, South Yorkshire, England, which is the home of Sheffield United.

The stadium was originally a cricket ground, built on a road named after the Bramall family of file and graver manufacturers. The Bramalls owned The Old White House, on the corner of Bramall Lane and Cherry Street, and the Sheaf House, now a pub, that still stands at the top of Bramall Lane.

It was the largest stadium in Sheffield in the 19th century, and hosted the city's most significant matches, including the final of the world's first football tournament, first floodlit match and several matches between the Sheffield and London Football Associations that led to the unification of their respective rules. It was also used by The Wednesday F.C. (later called Sheffield Wednesday) and Sheffield FC. It has been the home of Sheffield United since the club's establishment in 1889. It is the oldest major stadium in the world still hosting professional association football matches.

Bramall Lane is one of only two grounds (the other being the Oval) which has hosted England football internationals (five games before 1930), an England Test cricket match (in 1902, against Australia) and an FA Cup Final (the 1912 replay, in which Barnsley beat West Bromwich Albion 1–0). It also regularly hosted FA Cup semi-finals and replays between 1889 and 1938. In 2022, it hosted UEFA Women's Euro 2022 matches, including the semi-final between England and Sweden.

The ground has also hosted rugby league games for the Sheffield Eagles, as well as for the delayed 2021 Rugby League World Cup in 2022. The ground also hosted a Billy Graham revival meeting in 1985, rock concerts by Bruce Springsteen in 1988, a friendly match for the 150th anniversary of Sheffield FC when they played Inter Milan in 2007, a Travis Pastrana Motor cross event in 2016, an IBF Welterweight title boxing match featuring Sheffield United fan Kell Brook in 2017, the Women's League Cup final and a Rod Stewart concert in 2019, and Def Leppard and Mötley Crüe rock concerts in 2023. The stadium has also been used to host England men's and women's senior and youth teams in friendly and competitive matches.

The record attendance at the ground is 68,287, set during an FA Cup fifth round tie between Sheffield United and Leeds United on 15 February 1936. The ground was extensively renovated in the wake of the Taylor Report and has an all-seated capacity of 32,050.

== History ==
Bramall Lane (Sheffield)

=== Cricket ===
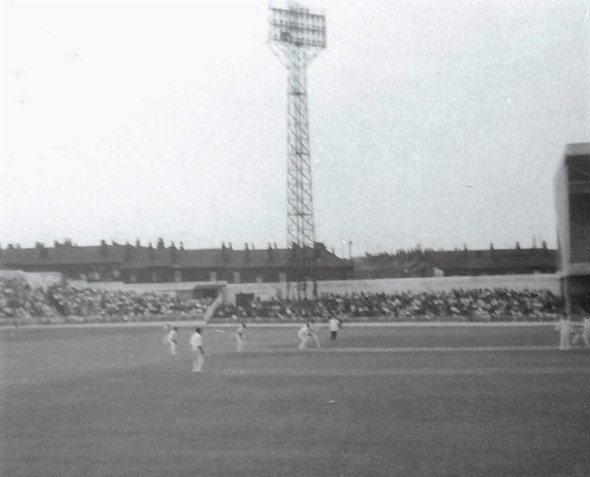
Cricket at Bramall Lane in 1965

Bramall Lane opened as a cricket ground in 1855, having been leased by Michael Ellison from the Duke of Norfolk at an annual rent of £70. The site was then away from the city's industrial area, and relatively free from smoke. It was built to host the matches of local cricket clubs and originally had six clubs playing there, one of whom was the Wednesday Cricket Club, which was founded in 1820 and turned out to be the direct forerunner of Sheffield Wednesday Football Club.

Bramall Lane opened on 30 April 1855 as a cricket ground with a match between "The Eleven" and "The Twenty Two", The Eleven, despite being the senior team, lost by an innings and 28 runs.

A team representing Yorkshire played the first county match at the ground, on 27 August 1855 against Sussex, but lost by an innings and 117 runs.

Although the first county game had been played eight years earlier, the official Yorkshire County Cricket Club was not formed until 1863. The idea came from Ellison, who was using his own finances to support the club, in order to improve Bramall Lane's financial position as the county's headquarters. It was the club's headquarters until 1893, when they moved to Headingley in Leeds.

In 1897, Jack Brown and John Tunnicliffe recorded a first wicket score of 378 against Sussex — a ground record that stands to this day. Brown's score of 311 and Yorkshire's innings of 681–5 declared were also records when the cricket ground closed. Other notable scores include 582–7 against Surrey in 1935 and 579 against the touring South Africa team in 1951. Six other scores in excess of 500 were made. In contrast there were a host of scores under 100, mainly in the 19th century, although Derbyshire's paltry total of 20 in 1939 remains the lowest ever score. Nottinghamshire were dismissed for 24 in 1888, but Kent bowled Yorkshire out for 30 during a match in 1865. Many of the low totals were made on rain affected, uncovered wickets.

The ground hosted a single Test match in 1902, against Australia, which England lost by 143 runs. Australia won thanks to a century by Clem Hill and the bowling of Saunders and Noble, who each took five wickets in England's first innings of 145 and Noble and Trumble who took six and four wickets respectively to bowl the home team out for 195 second time around. The defeat was blamed on the poor light at the ground; a product of smoke emitted by local factories. Attendances were poor and the experiment was never repeated.

In addition, Jack Brown's triple century 10 double centuries were scored on the ground. Len Hutton scored unbeaten two double centuries, a 280 not out against Hampshire in 1939 and 271 not out against Derbyshire in 1937. W Barber posted 255 against Surrey in 1935 while the great Indian batsman V.S. Hazare scored 244 not out for the Indian tourists in the first season after World War II.

Among many notable partnerships W. Barber and Maurice Leyland amassed 346 for the second wicket against Middlesex in 1932 and the aforementioned V.S. Hazare and Vinoo Mankad put on 322 for the Indians against Yorkshire for the 4th wicket in 1946. Only one century was scored in list A one-day cricket at Bramall Lane, John Hampshire's 108 against Nottinghamshire in 1970 in the Sunday League.

Three bowlers took all ten wickets in an innings at Bramall Lane, the feat being more common in the annals of first-class cricket than many imagine. The great Australian leg spinner Clarrie Grimmett took 10 for 37 for the tourists in 1930 while TF Smailes took all 10 for 47 for Yorkshire against Derbyshire in 1939. G. Wootton took 10 for 54 for an All England Eleven v Yorkshire in 1865 while 9 other bowlers took 9 wickets in an innings there, including a haul of 9 for 12 by the great Yorkshire slow left armer Hedley Verity.

The best match bowling figures at the ground, 16 for 114, were recorded by G. Burton of Middlesex against Yorkshire in 1888 while Hedley Verity took a remarkable 15 for 38 against Kent in 1936. Len Braund took 15 for 71 for Somerset in 1902 while W. G. Grace showed his youthful talent with the ball with a haul of 15 for 79 for Gloucestershire in 1872.

D. Hunter of Surrey dismissed caught five batsmen and stumped another in one innings in 1891 while Yorkshire stalwart Jimmy Binks completed 5 dismissals in an innings 3 times.

The two ends of the ground were known as the Pavilion End and the Football Ground End. Between 1863 and 1973, Yorkshire played 391 first class matches, including 339 County Championship matches at Bramall Lane. Yorkshire's last match at the ground took place on 4, 6 and 7 August 1973, a drawn game against Lancashire. The construction of the South Stand began soon after, over the cricket square, finally enclosing the football pitch on all four sides. Yorkshire's cricket games in Sheffield moved to Abbeydale Park.

=== International centuries ===
One Test century has been scored at the venue.

No.	Score	Player	Team	Balls	Opposing team	Date	Result
1	119	Clem Hill	Australia	NA	England	3 July 1902	Won

=== International five-wicket hauls ===
Five five-wicket hauls have been taken at the venue.

No.	Bowler	Date	Team	Opposing team	Inn	Overs	Runs	Wkts	Econ	Result
1	Sydney Barnes	3 July 1902	England	Australia	1	20	49	6	2.45	Lost
2	Jack Saunders	3 July 1902	Australia	England	2	15.3	50	5	3.22	Won
3	Monty Noble	3 July 1902	Australia	England	2	19	51	5	2.68	Won
4	Wilfred Rhodes	3 July 1902	England	Australia	3	17.1	63	5	3.66	Lost
5	Monty Noble	3 July 1902	Australia	England	4	21	52	6	2.47	Won

=== Football ===
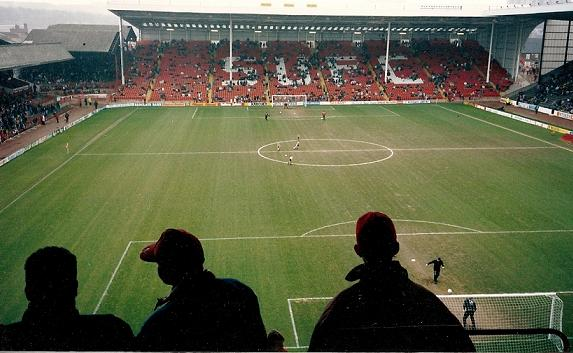
Bramall Lane in 1992. The old John Street terrace is at the left of the picture.

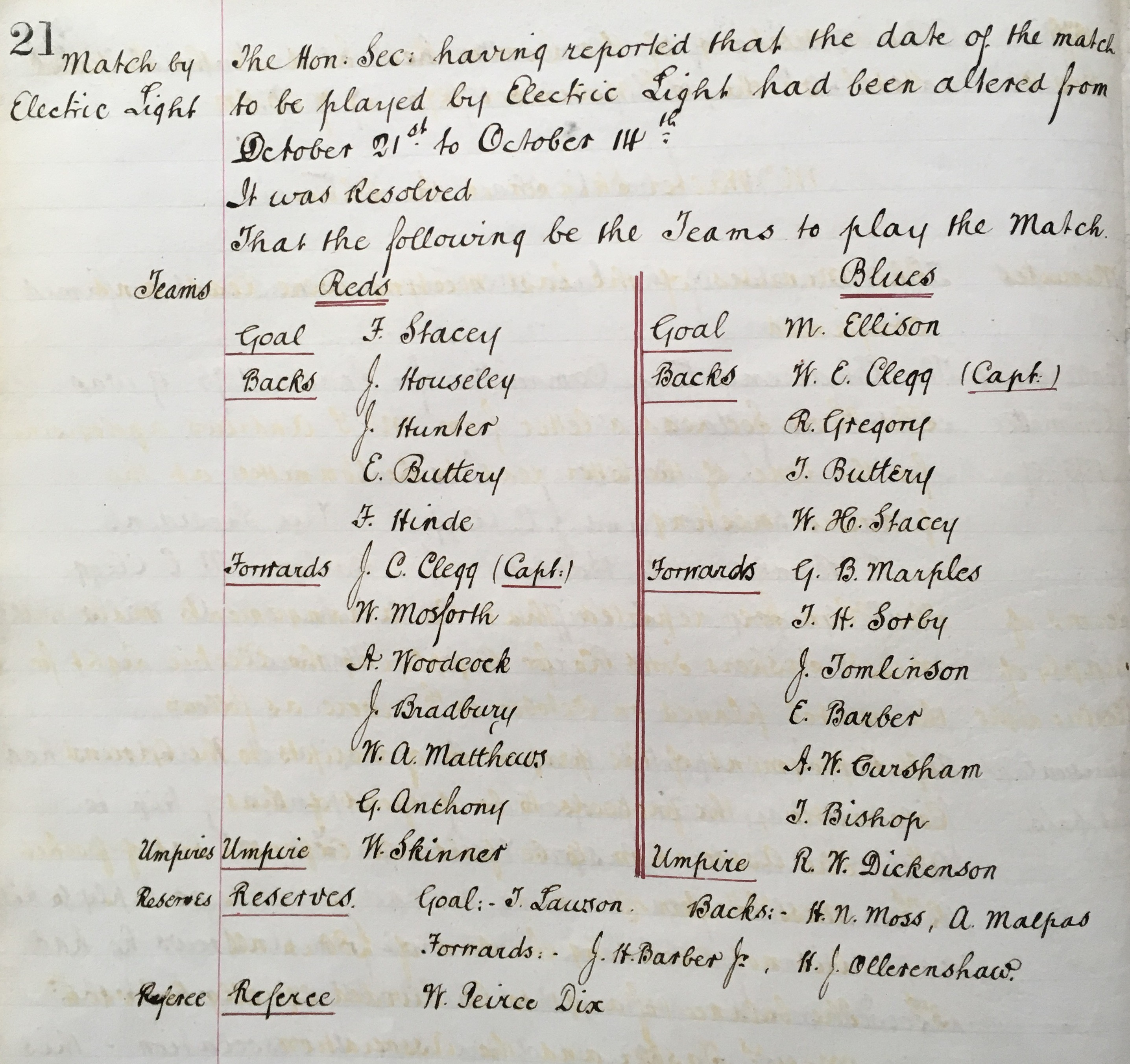
A page from the Sheffield FA handbook showing the team selection for the first ever floodlit game. The majority of players were members of the Wednesday F.C. club

The ground hosted its first football match on 29 December 1862, between Sheffield and Hallam. The game was played to raise money for the Lancashire Distress Fund during the cotton famine and ended 0–0.

As Sheffield's primary sporting stadium, it held all the most important local matches. Bramall Lane hosted the semi-final, final and second-place playoff of the 1867 Youdan Cup (won by Hallam). This was followed by the Cromwell Cup a year later, which was won by a newly formed team called The Wednesday. By 1877, a crowd of 8,000 watched The Wednesday beat Hallam in the Sheffield Challenge Cup. Bramall Lane effectively became The Wednesday's permanent home between 1880 and the opening of their new stadium at Olive Grove in 1887.

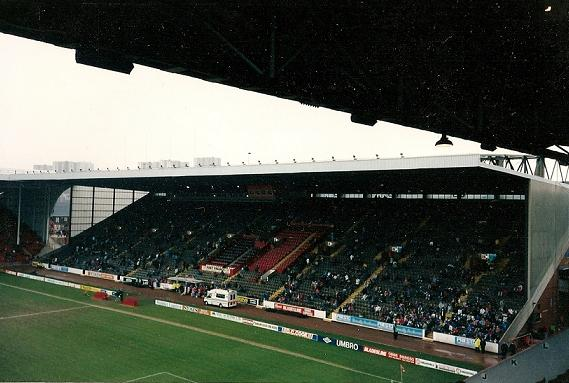
Bramall Lane in 1992

The first inter-association match, between the FA (often referred to as the London FA) and Sheffield FA, was also held at Bramall Lane on 2 December 1871. It was won 3–1 by the home side, who also arranged a number of games with other Associations including regular fixtures against the Glasgow FA (the first in 1874 and the last in 1957).

On 22 March 1889, six days after 22,688 people paid to watch the FA Cup semi-final between Preston North End and West Bromwich Albion, it was decided to create a home football team to play at Bramall Lane. It was named Sheffield United after the cricket team.

=== International matches ===
Bramall Lane was regularly used for international matches before the construction of a national stadium in London. The world's first ever floodlit football match took place at Bramall Lane on 14 October 1878 in front of an attendance of over 20,000. England's match against Scotland on 10 March 1883 was the first match between these two countries outside London or Glasgow. Bramall Lane is the second-oldest football venue in the world still capable of hosting international matches, after the Racecourse Ground in Wrexham.

Date		Result		Competition
4 October 1883	England	2–3	Scotland	Friendly (men)
5 February 1887	England	7–0	Ireland	British Home Championship
29 April 1889	England	4–0	Wales	British Home Championship
4 April 1903	England	1–2	Scotland	British Home Championship
20 October 1930	England	5–1	Ireland	British Home Championship
7 April 1990	England	1–0	Belgium	Euro 1991 qualifying group stage
9 March 1997	England	6–0	Scotland	Friendly (women)
3 December 2024	England	1–0	Switzerland	Friendly (women)

=== UEFA Women's Euro 2022 ===
Bramall Lane was one of several venues used for the UEFA Women's Euro 2022 tournament. It was used to host Group C matches, alongside Leigh Sports Village, and a semi-final, which involved England.

Date	Home	Away	Result	Attendance	Stage
9 July 2022	Netherlands	Sweden	1–1	21,342	UEFA Women's Euro 2022 Group B
13 July 2022	Sweden	Switzerland	2–1	12,914	UEFA Women's Euro 2022 Group B
17 July 2022	Switzerland	Netherlands	1–4	22,596	UEFA Women's Euro 2022 Group B
26 July 2022	England	Sweden	4–0	28,624	UEFA Women's Euro 2022 Semi Final

=== Milestones ===
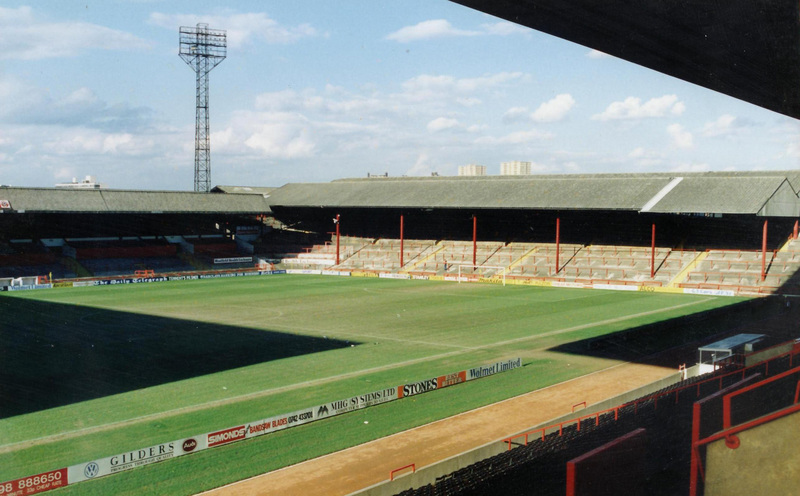
Bramall Lane in 1989, with the old John Street terrace on the left and the Kop terrace on the right

- 1855: The ground at Bramall Lane built for cricket.
- 1878: First floodlit game played between "Reds" and "Blues" (the first competitive floodlit game was held at Mansfield Town's Field Mill ground).
- 1889 Sheffield United Football Club founded.
- 1896: A new John Street Stand built with room for 6,000 both seated and standing.
- 1897: A new Shoreham Street Stand built.
- 1900: A new cricket pavilion built.
- 1901: Cycle track removed.
- 1911: Roof added to the Bramall Lane End.
- 1935: Roof added to the Kop. Running track built in front of John Street Stand.
- 1940: The ground damaged in Sheffield Blitz. John Street was badly affected and the Kop roof damaged.
- 1953: Floodlights installed.
- 1962: One floodlight collapsed and the Shoreham Street stand was damaged during the Great Sheffield Gale.
- 1966: Bramall Lane Stand opened.
- 1975: South Stand opened.
- 1981: Cricket pavilion demolished.
- 1991: Seats installed in Kop.
- 1994: John Street demolished. Seats added to lower tier of Bramall Lane End.
- 1995: New pylon-less floodlights installed.
- 1996: New John Street Stand opened.
- 2001: New corner stand holding 1,000 fans opened between Shoreham Street and John Street.
- 2002: Blades Enterprise Centre is built between John Street and Bramall Lane.
- 2005: Wooden seats removed from South Stand.
- 2006: New corner opens between Cherry Street and Bramall Lane. Bramall Lane end cantilevered.
- 2008: New hotel built on the corner of the south stand and Bramall Lane end.
- 2015: Desso pitch installed, bringing to an end around 153 years of football being played on a traditional surface.

== The ground today ==
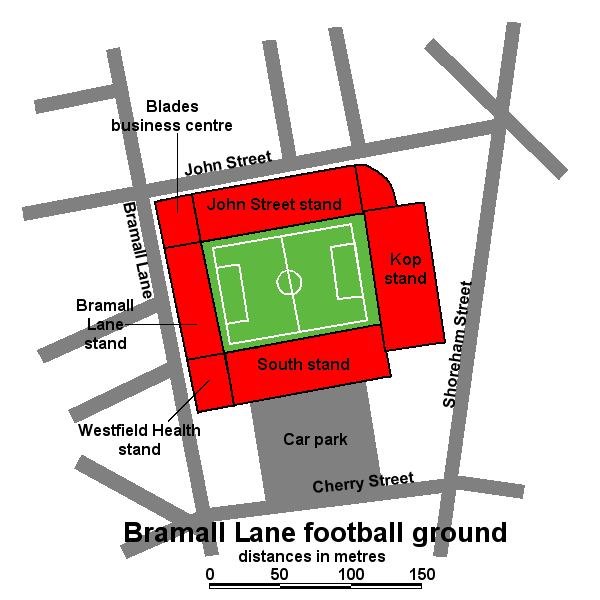
Plan view of the stadium and surrounding roads

=== The stands and layout ===
The ground has been an all-seater stadium since 1994 and comprises four stands and two corner infill sections in the north-east and south-west corners. The north-west corner (as well as a lot of the land under the John Street Stand) contains the Blades Enterprise Centre. The south-west corner behind the Bramall Lane corner stand is a four-star hotel built in 2008.

==== Bramall Lane Stand ====
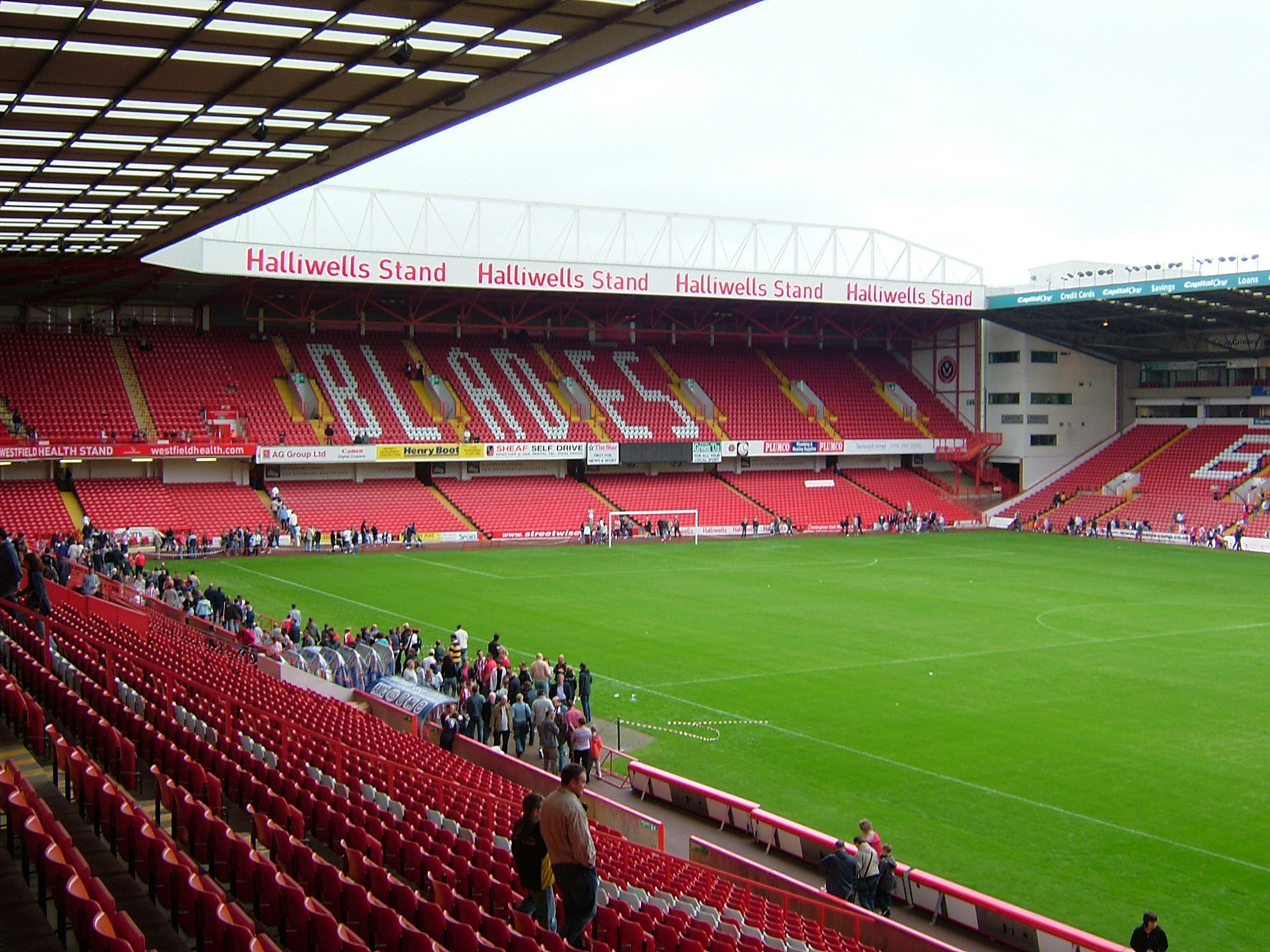
The Bramall Lane Stand, with the Blades Business Centre (right)

This is the oldest existing stand at Bramall Lane, this two-tiered structure was opened in 1966 behind the goal at the Bramall Lane end, opposite the Kop. The bottom tier is generally occupied by away fans whilst the upper tier, which links into the south-west corner infill stand, is given to home fans (although part of the upper tier may be offered to away fans for cup fixtures if demand is sufficient). During the 2005–06 season, the outside of the Bramall Lane Stand was reclad in red-and-white, with the stand sponsors and the club crest on the outside of the stand, while the wooden seats of the upper tier were replaced with newer plastic seats with the words "BLADES" written into them. When the corner infill stand was built during the close season, the roof over the Bramall Lane Stand was extended toward the pitch to provide better cover for the lower tier and to remove the supporting pillars from the upper tier. There are approximately 2,700 seats in the upper tier, and 2,990 in the lower, giving a total capacity of 5,680. This stand had for many years housed a basic LCD scoreboard and clock between the upper and lower tiers, however at the start of the 2006–07 season both were replaced by a modern colour video scoreboard.

The stand was temporarily known as the "Jessica Ennis Stand" following the 2012 Olympics but was renamed after sponsors in 2015. Ennis-Hill had threatened to remove her name from the stand following controversy over the club's decision to re-sign Ched Evans after his release from prison.

==== The Tony Currie Stand ====
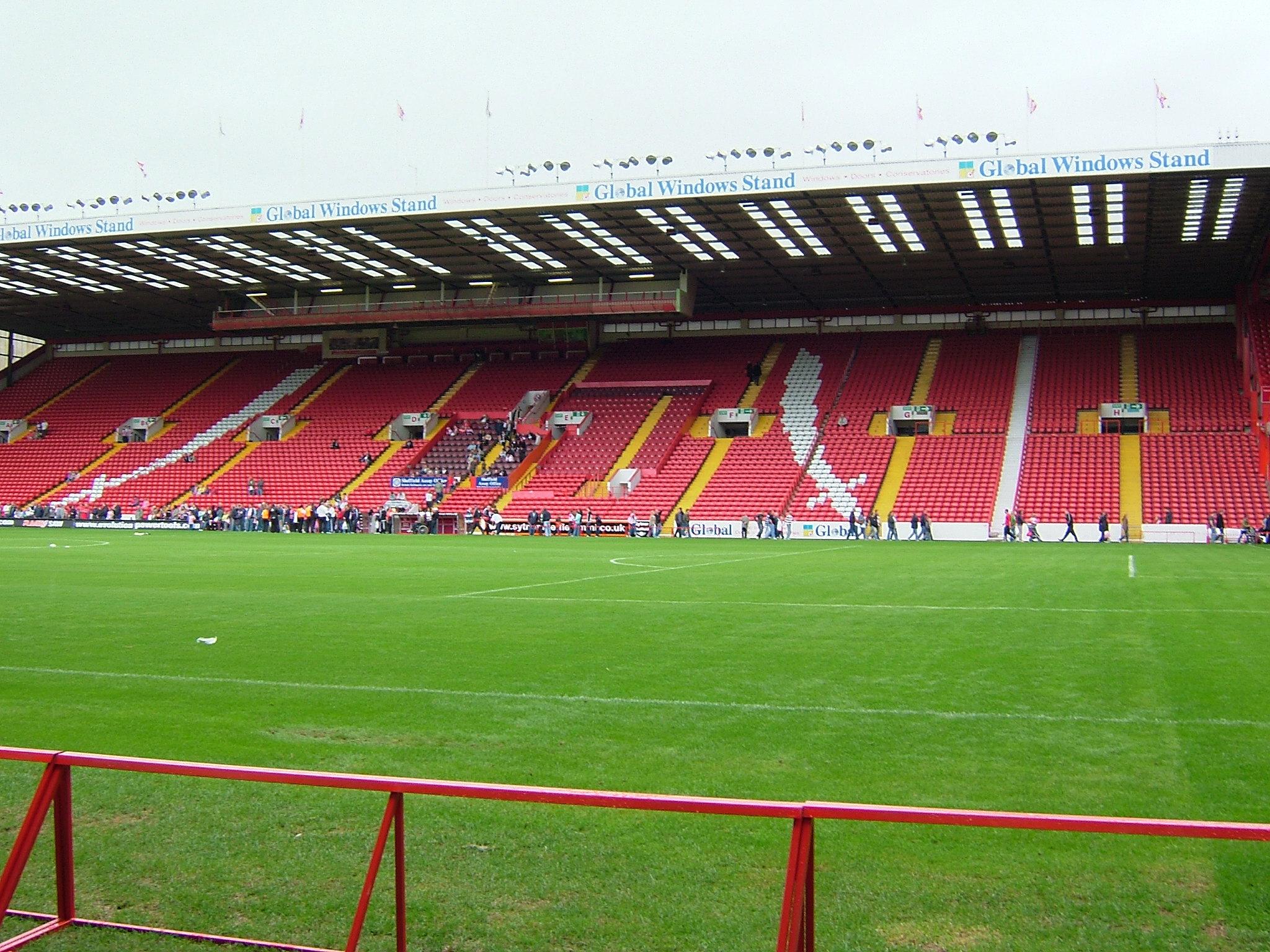
The South Stand, showing the new seats with sword emblems.

Located off Cherry Street, The Tony Currie Stand opened in August 1975. In 2018, the stand was named after Sheffield United legend Tony Currie. The Stand is also known as the "South Stand", although some fans still refer to it as the "Laver Stand" (after the stand's long-term sponsors in the 1990s) or even the "New Stand" by many older fans since there was no stand on the South end of the pitch until 1975, where previously it was used as the cricket pitch's outfield.

During the 2005–06 season, this stand was renovated, with a re-clad of the outside of the stand and the old wooden seats replaced by newer red plastic seats and white plastic seats forming an emblem of two swords. The box-seats were also upgraded. This stand holds approximately 7,500 fans, and most of the ground's amenities, including the box office, Blades Superstore, Platinum Suite, "Legends of the Lane" museum, "1889" award-winning restaurant (formerly known as Bosworth's of Bramall Lane), the former police control centre (now relocated to the Blades Enterprise Centre between the Bramall Lane and John Street Stands), newly refurbished reception, press box, players entrance, administrative offices and television gantry attached to the roof of the stand.

The bottom of the stand, facing into the club car park, has been made into a fans "Wall of Fame". Built of the ground's signature mark red bricks, each one is etched with an individual supporters' name or nickname. The wall was launched as a commercial venture by the club in the 1990s and is still offered today for other sections of the ground. Within the car park situated adjacent to the stand on Cherry Street, statutes were erected in 2010 commemorating Joe Shaw, holder of United's attendance record with 714 appearances, and Derek Dooley, former club chairman.

==== The Kop Stand ====
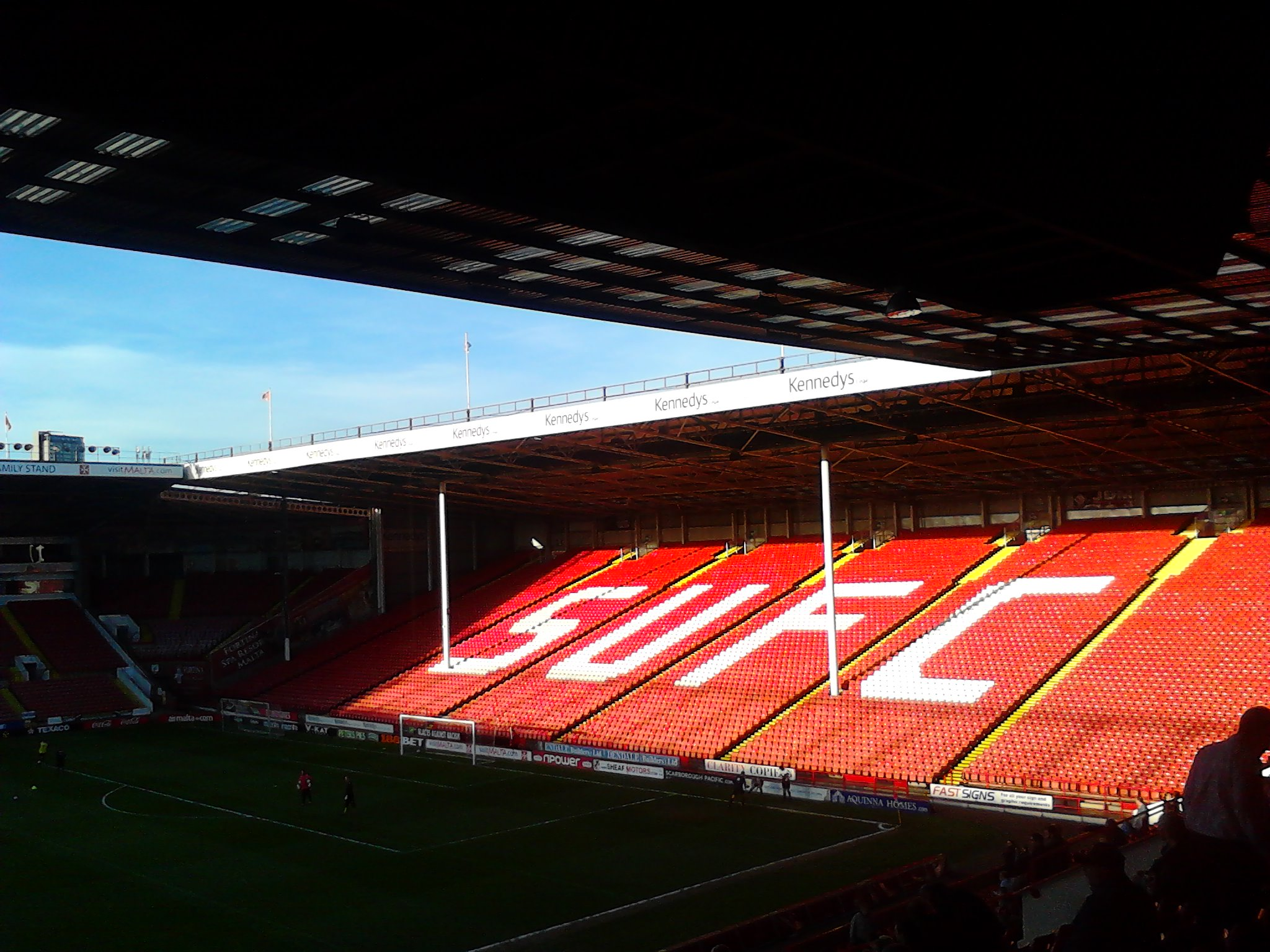
The Kop

Located on Shoreham Street, The Kop has been seated since 1991, this is the area in which the most boisterous home fans sit, such that former assistant manager (1999–2003) and manager (2008–10) Kevin Blackwell named the noise coming from this stand as the "Bramall Roar" after the 2003 play-off semi-final second-leg against Nottingham Forest, which the Blades won 4–3, coming from 0–2 down. The stand is currently sponsored by Kennedy's Law and, was formerly sponsored by Hallam FM. The stand itself is built into a hillside situated behind the goal, at the east end of the stadium. This places the stand along Shoreham Street, hence the often-heard chant of "Shoreham boys we are here oh oh oh oh, Shoreham boys we are here oh oh oh oh etc" coming from this stand on matchdays. It has the club's initials "SUFC" written into the seats, and holds 10,221 fans, making this the largest stand at Bramall Lane. The facilities are of lower quality in the Kop because there is no indoor concourse, although an outdoor bar was completed in September 2007 to complement the fast-food takeaway, but in spite of this it is still a firm favourite amongst the fans, and usually full on matchday.

==== John Street Stand ====
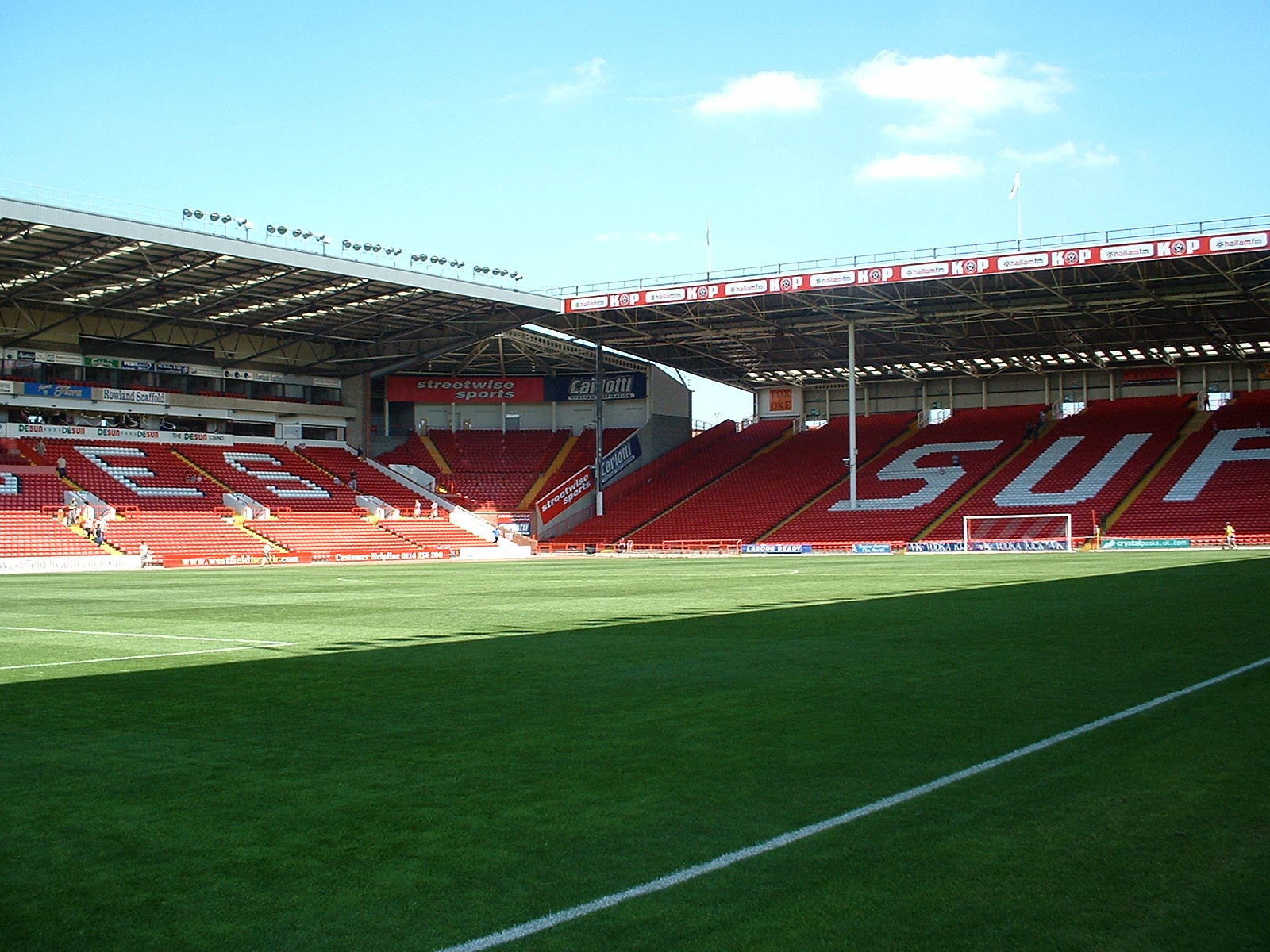
The John Street Stand on the left

The John Street stand, also known as the DSM Roofing stand for sponsorship reasons, is used as a family enclosure for home fans and is situated along the north side of the pitch. It was completed in 1966 to replace the previous terrace demolished two years prior. It has the word "BLADES" written in the seats and holds just under 7,000 fans. The stand also contains a row of wheelchair-accessible spaces along the pitch, along with the ground's 31 executive boxes, the International Bar and both the Tony Currie and 1889 suites, which provide the majority of Sheffield United's hospitality provision on matchdays.

==== John Street Corner ====
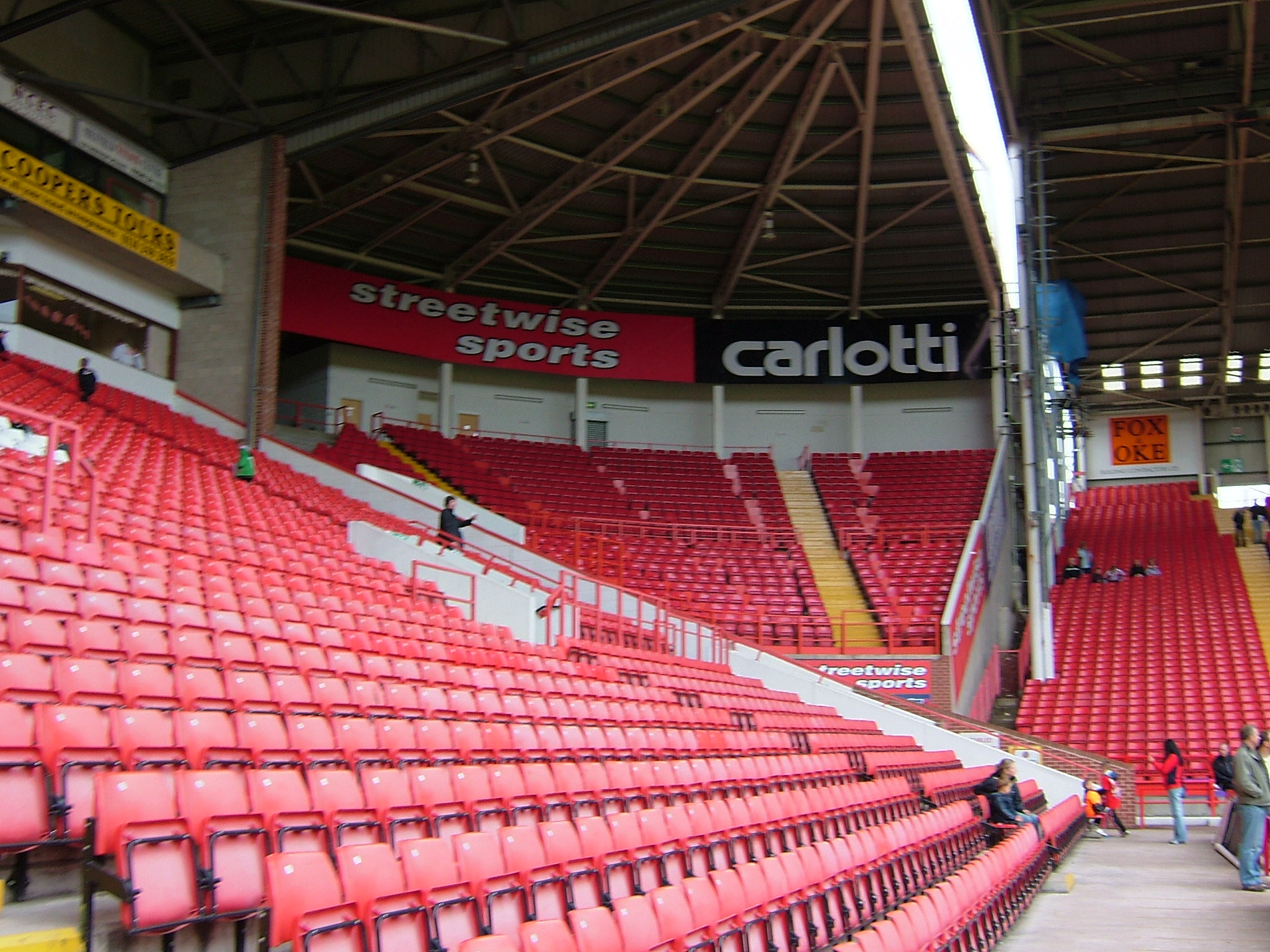
The John Street Corner, with Kop (right) and John Street Stand (foreground)

Also called the Northeast Corner and formerly known as the Pukka Pies Stand after its sponsorship deal, this stand was completed in 2001 and is between the Kop and the John Street stand. It is fully linked to the John Street Stand and is also used as a family enclosure holding around 900 fans (after the installation of new restricted-view seats after the 2006–07 campaign. This section of the ground has always been part of the Kop stand structure and the lower half was historically used as a family standing enclosure until it was demolished as part of the main Kop re-development.

==== Bramall Lane Corner ====
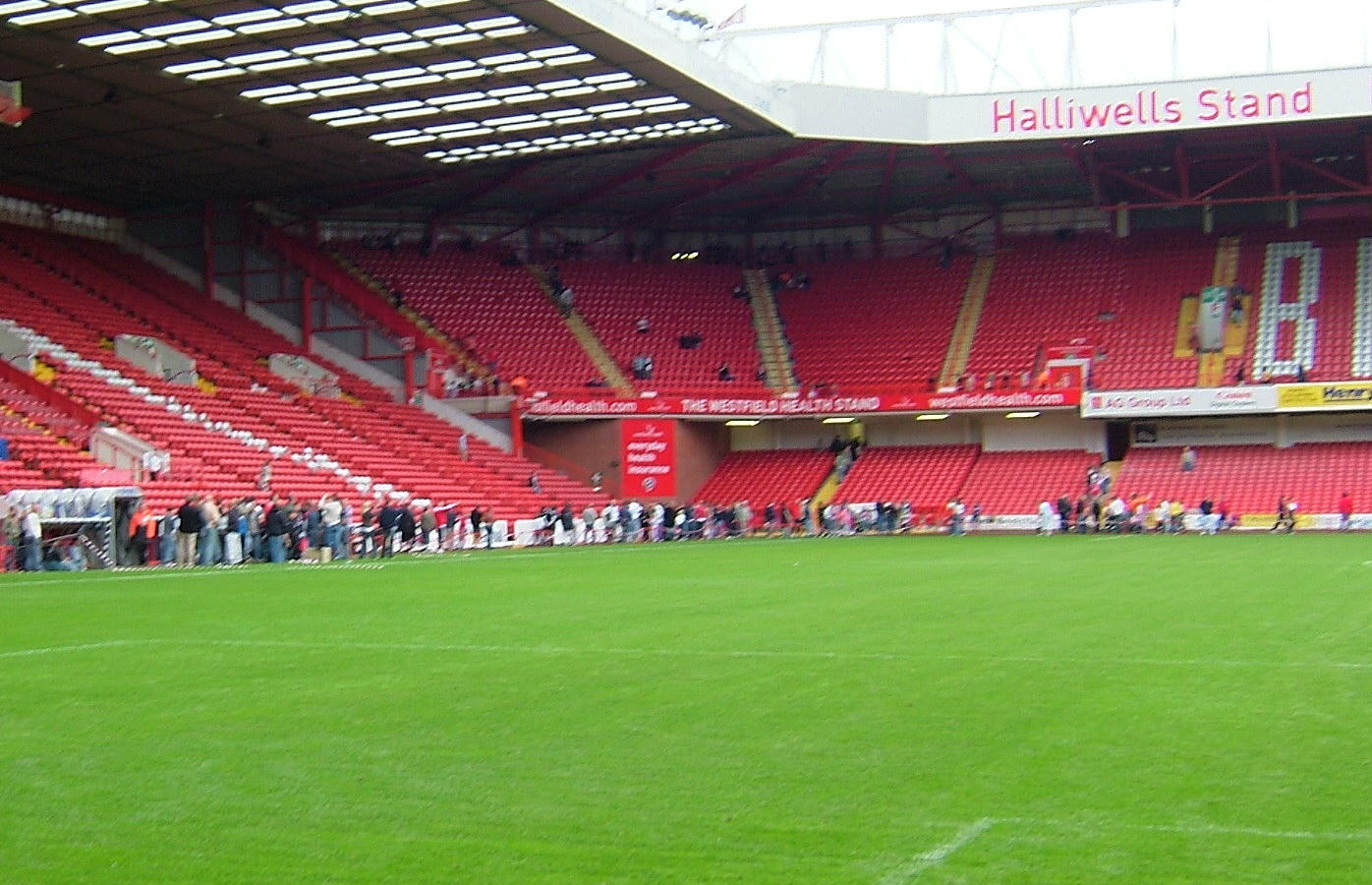
The Bramall Lane corner, with South Stand (left) and Bramall Lane End (right)

Also known as the "new" corner infill, this stand is in the south-west corner of the stadium, between the Bramall Lane Stand and the South Stand and was sponsored by Westfield Health. It is linked to the Bramall Lane Stand (upper tier), sharing its facilities, turnstiles and exits. It is always used by home fans, and reputedly has the best views of the ground. The stand holds approximately 2,000 fans. Built just behind the stand is a four-star hotel.

=== Blades Enterprise Centre ===
The north-west corner is filled in by rentable offices, known as the Blades Enterprise Centre, one of many examples of United diversifying their off-the-field activities to maximise income streams. Completed in 2002, the Enterprise Centre provides office space for smaller and new companies in the block between the John Street and Bramall Lane Stands, and also underneath the John Street Stand itself.

=== Hotel ===
The stadium has an enviable central location close to the city centre. In order to maximise the earnings potential of the land around the stadium in June 2007 work began to build a 158 bedroomed 4-star Millennium and Copthorne Hotel behind the new Westfield stand. The new hotel opened its doors in November 2008, but subsequently closed in June 2020. Hilton were chosen as the new operator of the hotel in 2021, with a DoubleTree branded hotel opening in August 2024.

== Current and ongoing work ==
At the Shareholders' meeting in November 2007 the club announced that it intended to extend the back of the Kop stand with an additional 3,200 seats and remove the pillars holding up the roof. The revised stand capacity is likely to be about 13,400, slightly less than the Holte End at Villa Park.

The club also planned a major upgrade to the Kop facilities and covering of the concourse areas, in tandem with a plan to build student accommodation at the back of the Kop and a large business centre (office block) between the Kop and South stand.

In the same meeting, the club announced that its long-term ambitions are to add an additional 6,000 seats to the South Stand with the intentions of taking the overall stadium capacity to just over 44,000, however this expansion would depend on demand in the Premier League and any potential 2018 World Cup venue bid. United PLC Former Chairman Kevin McCabe stated that he would build Bramall Lane's extensions to any specifications laid down by the FA with a view to the ground hosting matches should England be successful in winning their World Cup bid. However, on 16 December 2009, the FA announced that Hillsborough Stadium (home of rivals Sheffield Wednesday) would be Sheffield's venue in the event that a World Cup is awarded to England and Sheffield is named a host city. Following this announcement Sheffield United's Chief Executive, Trevor Birch, made it known that all planned redevelopment work had been put on hold until the club was able to regain and maintain Premier League status. The plans were later revived in 2017, with a planning application for the expansion of the South Stand submitted in 2018. As of 2024, work is yet to begin.

New proposals for the currently open corner between the Kop and South Stand were revealed in 2017, with the plans including the construction of a block of residential flats and a new, larger club shop.

== Attendance ==
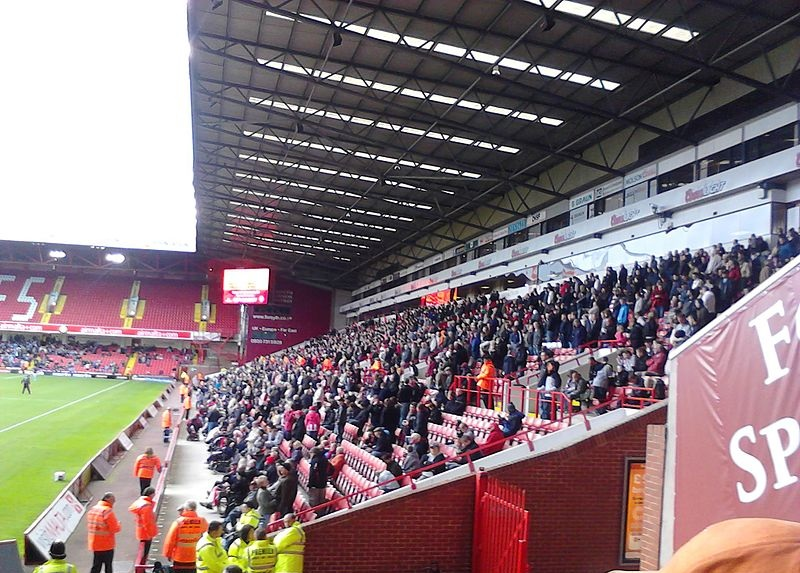
The John Street Stand before a Championship game v. Coventry City in 2010

The record attendance stands at 68,287 for the Sheffield United v. Leeds United FA Cup fifth round tie, played on 15 February 1936.

The record attendance since the 1994 introduction of all spectators being seated is 32,604 at the Sheffield United v. Wigan Athletic game in the Premier League, on 13 May 2007.

In the 2007–2008 season, Sheffield United had the best average attendance in the Championship. The following season Sheffield United had the second-best average attendance in the league of 26,023.

=== Average league attendances ===
This is the average league attendances stretching back to the 2009–10 season for Sheffield United home matches at Bramall Lane. Sheffield United away games and any home cup matches are excluded.

- 2009–2010: 25,120
- 2010–2011: 20,632
- 2011–2012: 18,702
- 2012–2013: 18,612
- 2013–2014: 17,507
- 2014–2015: 19,805
- 2015–2016: 19,803
- 2016–2017: 21,892
- 2017–2018: 26,854
- 2018–2019: 26,175
- 2019–2020: 24,370

== Location and transport ==
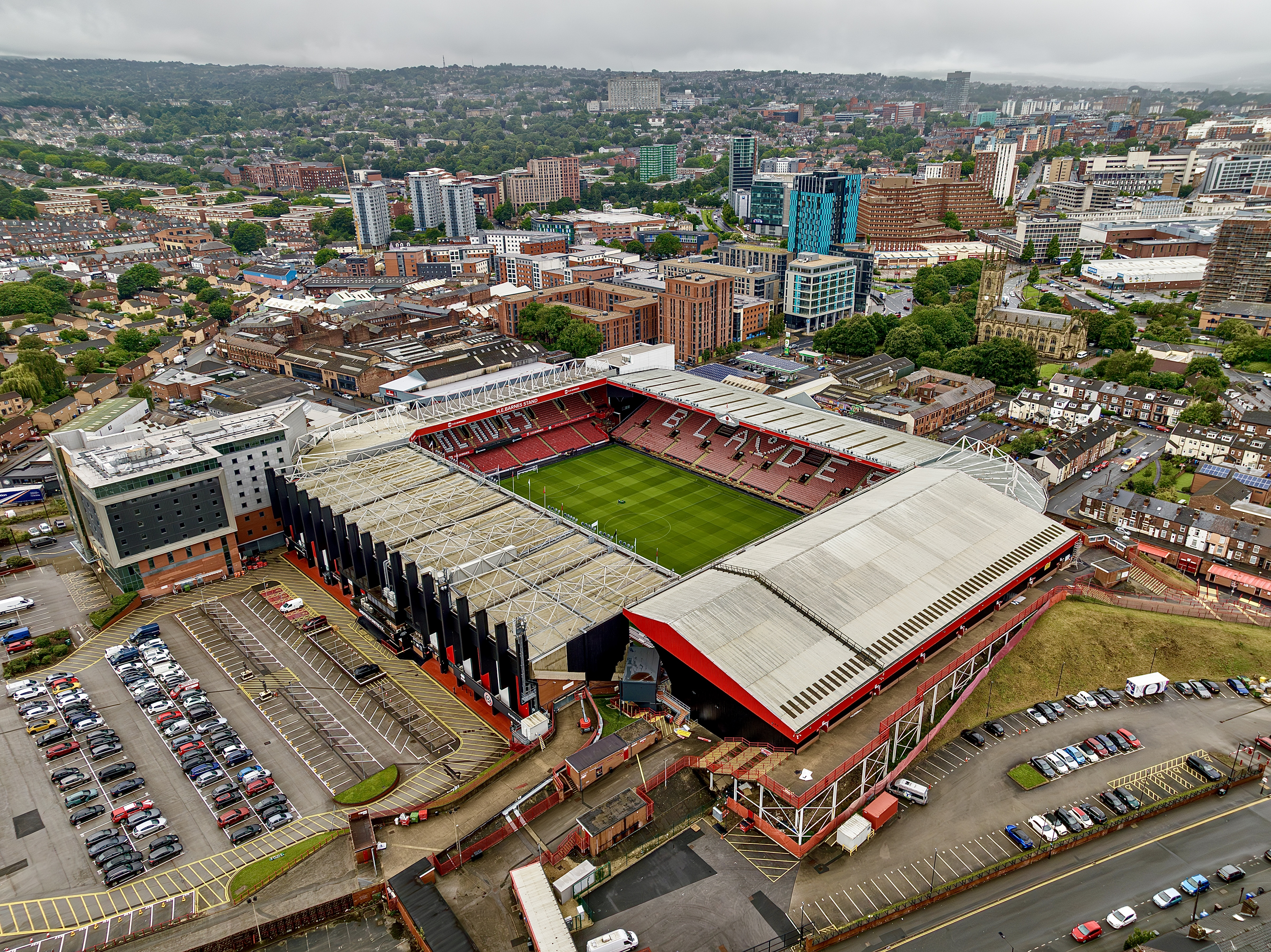
Bramall Lane, set against Sheffield’s skyline

Bramall Lane is located in the district of Highfield, south of Sheffield city centre. Heading south from Junction 4 of the A61 Sheffield Inner Ring Road which surrounds the city centre.

On match days Bramall Lane closes off to most traffic shortly before and after matches, with traffic diverted to Shoreham Street, or towards London Road or onto the A61. This is to ensure the safety of the public, as Bramall Lane is a main road labelled as the A621 and the turnstiles on Bramall Lane are only a few metres away from the road. Also this enables the away fans' coaches and team coaches to approach/leave the stadium unimpeded (usually with a police escort from/to Park Square roundabout) and avoid a bottleneck scenario.

=== Public transport ===
Sheffield station (Train and Tram) and Sheffield Interchange (Bus and Coach) are under a mile from the ground.

Sheffield's light rail tram network, called the Supertram, runs to the east of the ground. Granville Road or Park Grange Croft are the nearest tram stops, located half a mile from the ground. These stops are served by the Blue and Purple routes, both of which go to/from the city centre.

There are bus links outside the ground with bus stops on Shoreham Street and Bramall Lane. Other bus stops located near the ground are on Charlotte Road, Queens Road and London Road. All buses from these locations will go to/from the city centre.

=== Cycling ===
The stadium is located near Route 6 of the National Cycle Network with numerous cycle paths and lanes surrounding the stadium which connect to it. Bramall Lane roundabout has an underpass for easy access to/from the city centre for cycles and pedestrians, with Bramall Lane itself having an on-road cycle lane running its length. Shorham Street is a signed cycle route and St. Mary's Gate (A61 ring road) has a traffic free cycle path. There are various secured and unsecured bike parking facilities close to the ground.

== See also ==
- Lists of stadiums
