= Westfield Township, Illinois =

Westfield Township, Illinois may refer to one of the following townships:

- Westfield Township, Bureau County, Illinois
- Westfield Township, Clark County, Illinois

See also

- Westfield Township (disambiguation)
