= Westfield School =

Westfield School may refer to:

== United Kingdom ==
- Westfield School, Bourne, in Lincolnshire
- Westfield School, Bourne End, a special school in Buckinghamshire
- Westfield School, Newcastle upon Tyne, in Tyne and Wear
- Westfield School, Sheffield, in South Yorkshire
- Westfield Community Technology College, in Watford, Hertfordshire
- Westfield Primary School, in Berkhamsted, Hertfordshire
- Former name of Westfield Academy, Yeovil, in Somerset

== United States ==
- The Westfield School, a private PK-12 school in Perry, Georgia
- Westfield Community School, a K-8 school in Algonquin, Illinois

== See also ==
- Westfield High School (disambiguation)
- Westfield Schools (disambiguation)
