= Sheffield United F.C. =

Association football club in England

Sheffield United
- Full name: Sheffield United Football Club
- Nickname: The Blades
- Founded: 22 March 1889; 137 years ago
- Stadium: Bramall Lane
- Capacity: 32,050
- Owner: COH Sports
- Chairman: Steven Rosen and Helmy Eltoukhy
- Manager: Chris Wilder
- League: EFL Championship
- 2025–26: EFL Championship, 13th of 24
- Website: sufc.co.uk
Home colours	Away colours	Third colours

Sheffield United Football Club is a professional football club based in Sheffield, South Yorkshire, England. The club competes in the second tier of English football. Nicknamed "the Blades" due to Sheffield's history of cutlery production, the team have played home games at Bramall Lane since their formation. For most of the club's history, Sheffield United have played in red and white striped shirts with black shorts. Their main rivals are Sheffield Wednesday, with whom they contest the Steel City derby.

Sheffield United was formed as an offshoot of Sheffield United Cricket Club in 1889. Following strong performances in the Midland League and Northern League, they were invited to become a founding member of the Football League Second Division in 1892. They won promotion to the First Division at the end of the 1892–93 season, the first team to do so, and went on to be crowned English football champions in 1897–98. United went on to win the FA Cup on four occasions: 1899, 1902, 1915 and 1925; and were beaten finalists in 1901. They spent 41 years in the top-flight before being relegated in 1934. United finished as FA Cup runners-up in 1936 and were promoted as runners-up of the Second Division in 1938–39.

United won the Second Division title in 1952–53, following relegation in 1949. They spent the next three decades between the First and Second Divisions, winning promotions in 1960–61 and 1970–71 after relegations in 1956 and 1968. However, a slow decline saw the club drop to the fourth tier by 1981, though they would win an immediate promotion as Fourth Division champions in 1981–82; this achievement meant that Sheffield United are one of only five sides to have won all four professional divisions of English football. Promoted in 1983–84, they recovered from relegation in 1988 to win consecutive promotions into the top-flight at the end of the 1989–90 campaign.

Sheffield United were founding members of the Premier League in the 1992–93 season, during which they scored the first ever goal of the competition. They were relegated in 1994 and after losing play-off finals in 1997 and 2003, the club finally regained their Premier League status at the end of the 2005–06 campaign under the stewardship of manager Neil Warnock. However, United were relegated the following year and dropped into League One in 2011. They spent six seasons in the third tier, losing in three play-off campaigns, before manager Chris Wilder led the club to promotion as champions in 2016–17. Promotion to the Premier League followed in 2018–19, though they returned to the Championship in 2021. The club played in the Premier League following a promotion from the EFL Championship in the 2022–23 season, but were relegated in the following season.

== History ==
=== Formation and glory years (1888–1975) ===
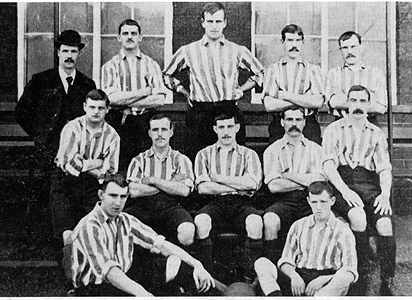
The United team from 28 September 1895 before a match against Stoke City

The club was formed by members of the Sheffield United Cricket Club, formed in 1854 and the first English sports club to use 'United' in its name. Sheffield United's predominant nickname is "The Blades", a reference to Sheffield's status as the major producer of cutlery in the United Kingdom. United's original nickname was in fact "The Cutlers" from 1889 to 1912. City rivals Wednesday held the nickname "The Blades" in their early years, however in 1907 Wednesday officially became "The Owls", in reference to their new ground in Owlerton, and United would later claim "The Blades" nickname for themselves.

Sheffield United officially formed on 22 March 1889 at the Adelphi Hotel, Sheffield (now the site of the Crucible Theatre) by the President of the Cricket Club, Sir Charles Clegg. The Wednesday had moved from Bramall Lane to their own ground at Olive Grove after a dispute over gate receipts and the tenants of Bramall Lane needed to create a new team to generate income. Sir Charles Clegg was incidentally also the president of The Wednesday.

Undoubtedly United's heyday was the 30-year period from 1895 to 1925, when they were champions of England in 1897–98 and runners-up in 1896–97 and 1899–1900, and FA Cup winners in 1899, 1902, 1915 and 1925. United have not won a trophy since 1925, bar those associated with promotion from lower leagues, their best performances in the cup competitions being several semi-final appearances in the FA Cup and League Cup.

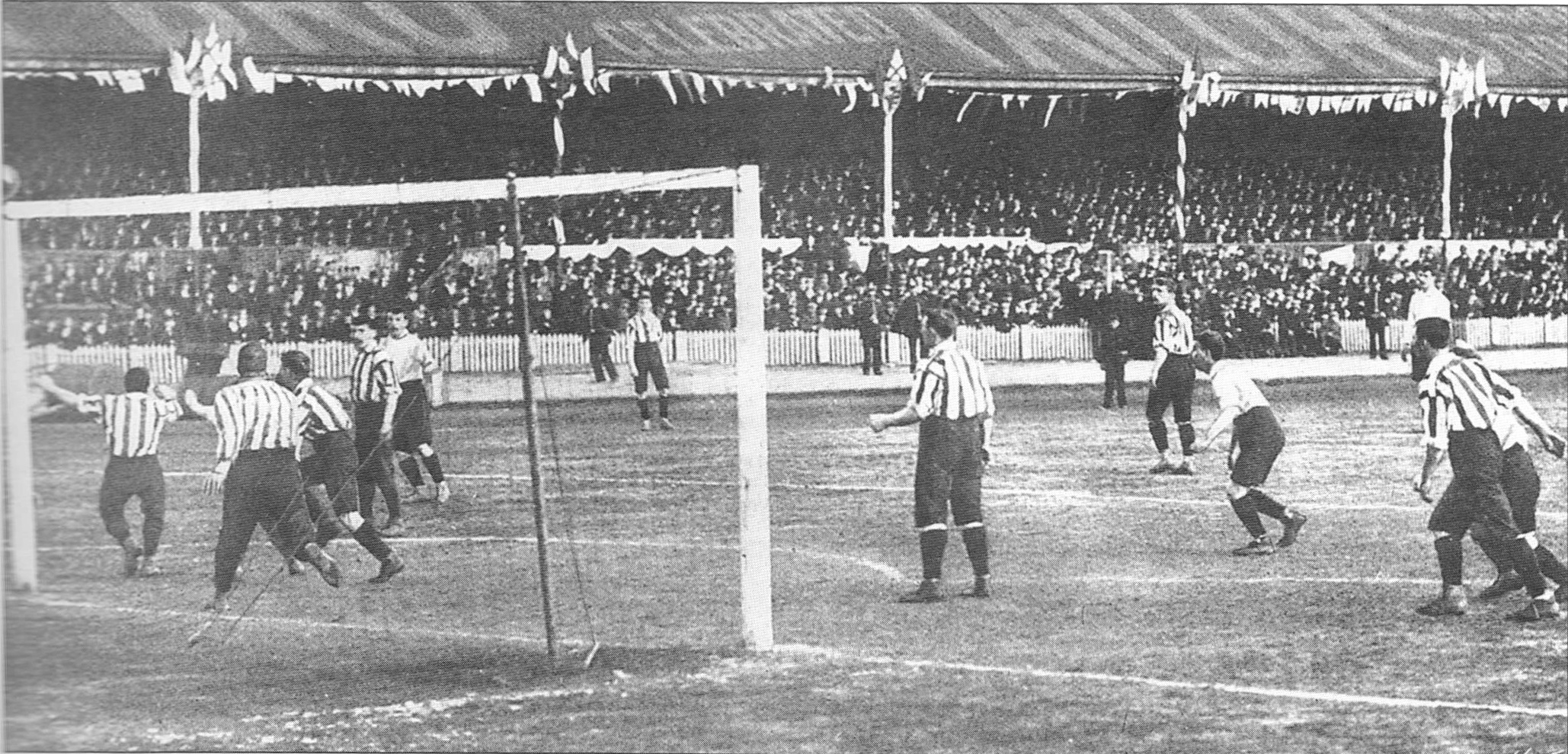
United conceding the third goal in the 1901 FA Cup Final against Tottenham Hotspur at Burnden Park in Bolton

=== Fall from grace and brief revival (1975–1994) ===
Their darkest days came between 1975 and 1981. After finishing sixth in the First Division at the end of the 1974–75 season, they were relegated to the Second Division the following season, and three years after that setback they fell into the Third Division. They reached an absolute low in 1981 when they were relegated to the Fourth Division, but were champions in their first season in the league's basement division and two years afterwards they won promotion to the Second Division.

They fell back into the Third Division in 1988, but new manager Dave Bassett masterminded a quick revival which launched the Blades towards one of the most successful eras in their history. Successive promotions in the aftermath of the 1988 relegation saw them return to the First Division in 1990 after a 14-year exile. They survived at this level for four seasons (being founder members of the new Premier League in 1992 after peaking with a ninth-place finish in the last season of the old First Division) and reached an F.A. Cup semi-final in the 1992–93 season before being relegated in 1994.

=== Financial trouble and fall to League One (1994–2013) ===
Chart of Sheffield United's Performances

They remained outside the top flight for the next 12 years, although they qualified for the play-offs under Bassett's successor Howard Kendall in 1997 and caretaker manager Steve Thompson in 1998. They were struggling at the wrong end of Division One when Neil Warnock was appointed manager in December 1999, and a financial crisis was preventing the club from being able to boost their squad, but in 2002–03 they enjoyed their most successful season for a decade, reaching the semi-finals of both domestic cups and also reaching the Division One play-off final, where they were beaten 3–0 by Wolverhampton Wanderers. Three years later, however, Warnock delivered a Premier League return as the Blades finished runners-up in the re-branded Championship. They lasted just one season back amongst the elite, before being relegated from the Premier League amidst the controversy surrounding Carlos Tevez, the player who was controversially signed by West Ham United and whose performances played a big part in their remarkable escape from relegation. Neil Warnock resigned as manager after the Blades went down. The team also purchased Chinese club Chengdu Wuniu in 2006, and redesigned the club crest in the style of the Sheffield United badge and renamed the team "Chengdu Blades". The team were dissolved in 2015.

The club struggled to come to terms with life back in the Championship, with a spiralling wage bill not being matched by the quality of the players brought in, and a succession of managers within a short period of time. The Blades reached the Championship playoff final in 2009 under Kevin Blackwell, but a period of decline then set in. The 2010–11 season proved disastrous, with the club employing three different managers in the span of a season, which ultimately ended in relegation to League One under Micky Adams, meaning they would play in the third tier of English football for the first time since 1989. United qualified for the League One play-offs in 2011–12 and 2012–13 but lost in the final and semi-final respectively.

=== Saudi takeover and return to the top flight (2013–2024) ===
In September 2013, Abdullah bin Mosaad Al Saud of the House of Saud had bought a 50 per cent stake in United's parent company "Blades Leisure Ltd". Both parties, at that time, agreed to include a "roulette notice" mechanism to end their arrangement when they no longer wished to work together. In 2014, United reached the FA Cup semi-finals at Wembley Stadium but lost 5–3 to Hull City. In 2014–15, the team reached the quarter-finals of the FA Cup and semi-finals of the Football League Cup. United secured promotion back to the second tier in the 2016–17 season under the management of lifelong United fan and former player Chris Wilder, winning the League One title with 100 points. In late 2017, co-owner Kevin McCabe served a roulette notice on Prince Abdullah, giving him the option to sell his 50 per cent at £5 million or buy McCabe's 50 per cent for the same price. Prince Abdullah chose to buy but McCabe refused to sell, a decision that ended up before the High Court of Justice.

In the 2018–19 season, Sheffield United achieved automatic promotion to the Premier League. United's first season back in the Premier League, despite being tipped by many for relegation, produced a ninth-place finish. Despite this, ownership disputes between Prince Abdullah and McCabe continued. In September 2019, after 20 months of litigation, the High Court issued its judgment, requiring McCabe's company to sell its shares in United. McCabe sought permission to appeal from the High Court and Court of Appeal but both appeals were rejected. As a result, Prince Abdullah became the sole beneficial owner of the club. The club had a very poor start to the 2020–21 season, winning just one of their opening 18 matches. Wilder left the club by mutual consent in March 2021. He was replaced by Paul Heckingbottom as caretaker manager, who could not prevent relegation at the end of the season.

In May 2021, the club appointed Slaviša Jokanović as the new manager, making him the first overseas manager the club's history. However, Jokanović was dismissed in November 2021 after a poor start to the season and Heckingbottom was reappointed as manager, this time on a permanent basis. Heckingbottom appointed former Sheffield United players Stuart McCall and Jack Lester as part of his coaching team. The 2021–22 season resulted in a fifth-place finish in the Championship, losing in the play-off semi-finals to Nottingham Forest on penalties. During the following season, Nigerian businessman Dozy Mmobuosi failed with an attempted £90 million takeover of the financially troubled club having reportedly paid a near-£10 million non-refundable deposit. By the end of the season, Heckingbottom had guided United back to the Premier League, securing automatic promotion with a second-place finish. The team also reached the FA Cup semi-finals, losing 3–0 to Manchester City at Wembley Stadium.

Sheffield United's return to the Premier League for the 2023–24 season proved to be difficult and by early December they sat at the bottom of the league. The club's board decided to dismiss Heckingbottom, replacing him with former Blades manager Chris Wilder. Despite the managerial change, the team's poor form continued and their relegation back to the Championship was confirmed on 27 April 2024 following a 5–1 loss to Newcastle United. On 11 May 2024, after conceding the 101st goal of their campaign in a 1–0 defeat to Everton, Sheffield United set a new record for the most goals conceded in a single Premier League season, breaking Swindon Town's record of 100 from the 1993–94 season. On the final matchday of the season, the club lost 3–0 to Tottenham Hotspur at home, finalising their new record of 104 goals conceded, in addition to a goal difference of −69, matching Derby County's record from the 2007–08 season. Furthermore, they set new records for goals conceded at home with 57, surpassing Aston Villa's record from the 1935–36 season, and recorded a home goal difference of −38.

=== Championship years (2024–present) ===
In December 2024, an American consortium, COH Sports, led by businessmen Steven Rosen and Helmy Eltoukhy, completed a takeover, ending Prince Abdullah's five-year ownership of the club. In the 2024–25 season, the Blades finished third in the EFL Championship, narrowly failing to win automatic promotion, and lost to Sunderland in the playoff final in extra time. Wilder's contact was terminated in June 2025. Wilder was reappointed on a two-year contract on 15 September 2025, following the dismissal of Rubén Sellés after a poor start to the season, and the Blades finished the 2025–26 Championship season in 13th place. In July 2026, Prince Abdullah claimed he was owed £35m by COH Sports and issued a winding-up petition against the consortium which the owners did not contest; after a brief High Court hearing on 19 August 2026, a 12-points deduction remained a possibility while Rosen and Eltoukhy could face action from the Independent Football Regulator. In October 2026, club CEO Stephen Bettis said the club did not expect to receive an EFL points deduction as the club had not gone into insolvency; the EFL said matters were still ongoing.

== Kits, colours and crest ==
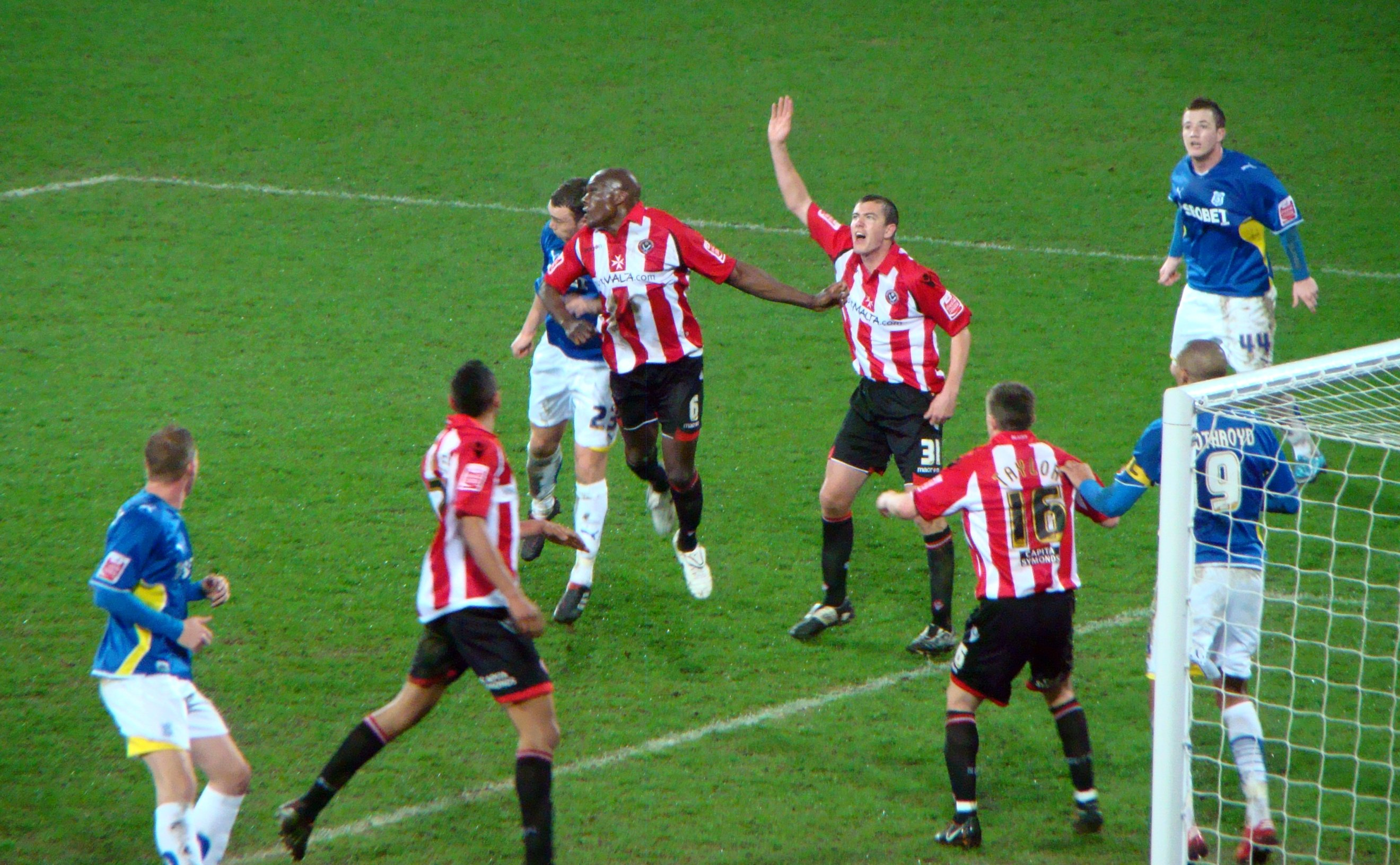
Sheffield United playing against Cardiff City in 2010

Sheffield United have played in red and white stripes for most of their history, but began playing in white shirts and blue shorts. They briefly played in narrow red stripes for the 1890–91 season, before returning to all-white the following year. The stripes returned in the 1892–93 season, with black shorts replacing the blue in 1904. The shirts remained largely unchanged until collars were first removed in 1955, replaced by V-necks until the 1966–67 season (when white socks were also used), and from here on the neck style varied. The club had the alternative nickname of the Sugarsticks in the 1920s, due to the rock candy-like shirt.

The traditional red and white stripes remained until the 1974–75 season, when elements of black were added, until the 1979–81 and 82 season kit. This was white with a red breast, and with thin stripes down either side, and was created to accommodate the logo of the club's principal sponsor, Cantor's, a local furniture shop. This was to be replaced by a striped kit, with the sponsor Bentley's (1981–82) and Renault (1982–83) written vertically down a white stripe over the left-hand side. Their kits continued to feature striped shirts, albeit with various aids to accommodate their sponsors, including a yellow square for Laver from 1988 to 1992 (the 1990–92 shirt also featured narrow black stripes through each white stripe) and a black hoop, also for Laver in the 1994–95 season. Then came the diamond kit, which was so badly received that the club reverted to stripes the following season. Since then, red and white stripes and black socks with varying trim have been the order of the day, with black shorts for all but the 2002–05 seasons, when white and then red were tried. The club also every few seasons opt to put thin black stripes between the red and white stripes. Sheffield United's home colours were the inspiration for the kit of Irish club, Derry City. In 1934, Derry City adopted the stripes, while Billy Gillespie was manager of the club, in recognition of Gillespie's achievements at Sheffield United.

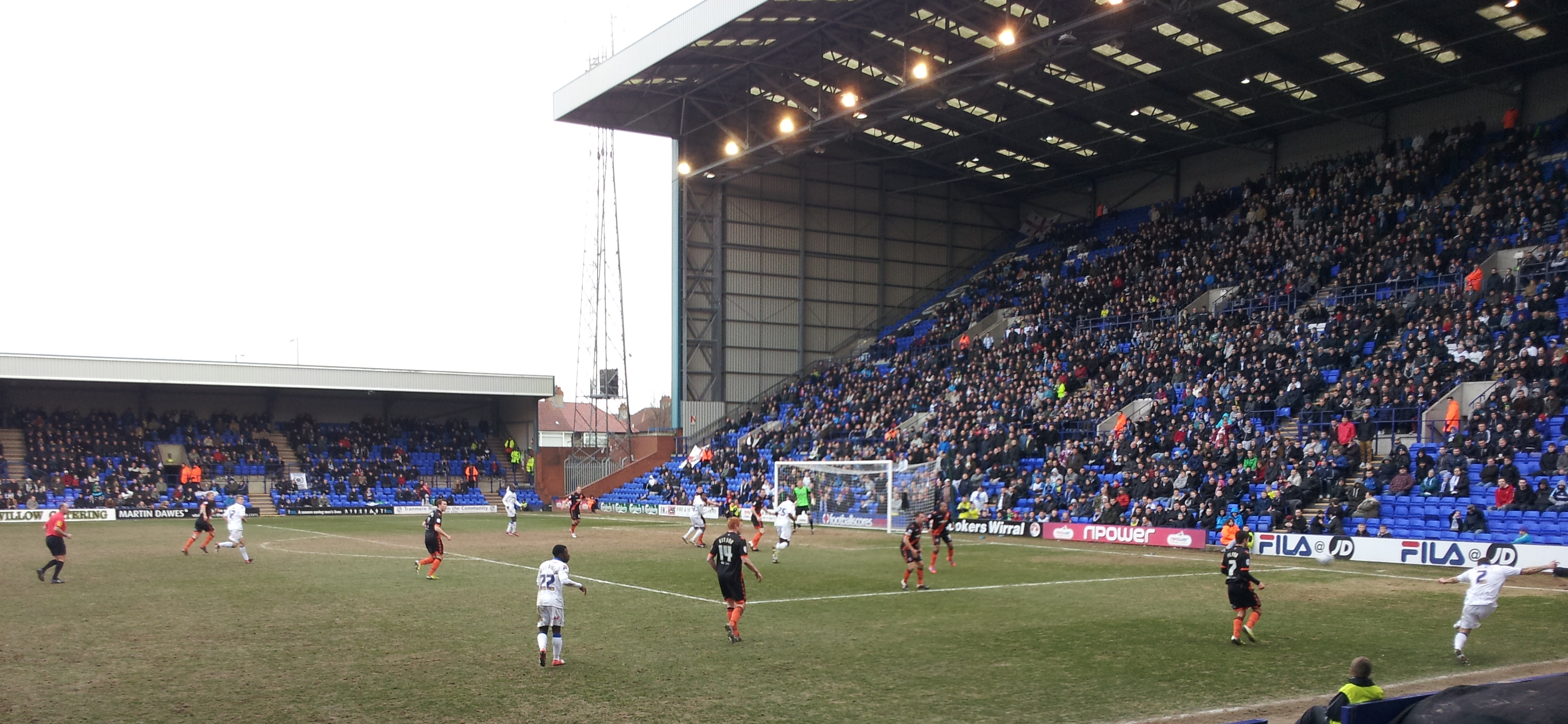
Sheffield United plays away to Tranmere Rovers in 2013.

The first time a crest appeared on the shirt was in the 1891–92 season, when a red crest appeared on the white shirt, but this disappeared the following season. United used the city of Sheffield's coat of arms from 1965 to 1977, when a new crest was used, introduced by former manager Jimmy Sirrel, but designed apparently over 20 years previously by former player Jimmy Hagan. This consisted of two white crossed swords, or blades, the club's nickname, with a Yorkshire Rose above, on a black background. This is surrounded by a red ring with "Sheffield United F.C." written around the top and "1889", the year the club was founded, underneath. This has been altered very slightly a few times, with a simple black embroidered crest appearing on shirts from 1987 to 1990, and an all-white crest on a red-edged black shield for the 1992–99 seasons, but reverted to its original form in 2000.

=== Shirt sponsors and manufacturers ===
Year	Kit manufacturer	Main shirt sponsor	Secondary sponsor
1973–1975	Umbro	None	None
1975–1979	Admiral	None	None
1979–1981	Hobott	Cantor's	None
1981–1982	Hobott	Bentleys	None
1982–1983	Hobott	Renault	None
1983–1985	Umbro	Simonds	None
1985–1995	Umbro	Arnold Laver	None
1995–1997	Avec	Wards	None
1997–1999	Le Coq Sportif	Wards	None
1999–2000	Le Coq Sportif	Blades	None
2000–2002	Patrick	Midas Games	None
2002–2004	Le Coq Sportif	Desun	None
2004–2006	Le Coq Sportif	HFS Loans	None
2006–2007	Le Coq Sportif	Capital One	None
2007–2008	Le Coq Sportif	Capital One	Valad
2008–2009	Le Coq Sportif	VisitMalta.com	Valad
2009–2011	Macron	VisitMalta.com	Capita
2011–2012	Macron	Westfield Health (Home); Gilder Group/Volkswagen (Away)	Nexis Holdings PLC
2012–2013	Macron	Westfield Health (Home); Redtooth (Away)	GCI Com
2013–2014	Macron	VSports (Home); Top Spring (Away)	Football Manager; Shebang
2014–2016	Adidas	John Holland Sales	DBL Logistics
2016–2017	Adidas	Alpha Rooms	Door Deals
2017–2018	Adidas	Teletext Holidays	Door Deals
2018–2019	Adidas	Ramsdens Currency	Door Deals
2019–2021	Adidas	Union Standard Group	Union Standard Group
2021–2022	Adidas	Randox	Door Deals
2022–2023	Erreà	Randox	Ultimate Champions
2023–2024	Erreà	CFI Financial Group	Gtech
2024–2025	Erreà	Maneki	DR CINIK
2025–2026	Erreà	Midnite	Village Hotel Club
2026–2027	Adidas	Midnite	Village Hotel Club

== Ground ==
Bramall Lane
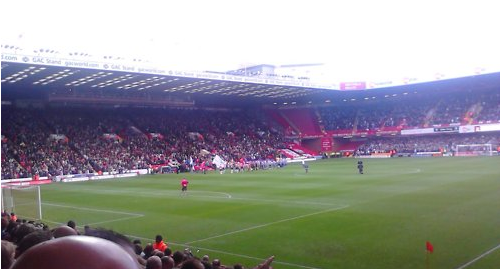
- A near-full capacity South Stand and adjacent Bramall Lane Stand at Bramall Lane
- Interactive map of Bramall Lane
- Location: Sheffield, South Yorkshire, England
- Coordinates: 53°22′13″N 1°28′15″W
- Owner: Sheffield United
- Capacity: 31,884

Construction
- Opened: 30 April 1855

Sheffield United play at Bramall Lane, near the centre of Sheffield. Bramall Lane is the oldest major league ground anywhere in the world, having hosted its first game in 1862, a match between Hallam and Sheffield Club. Bramall Lane also hosted the world's first ever floodlit football match on 14 October 1878 with two teams picked from the Sheffield Football Association. The power for the lights was provided by two generators. The crowd was 20,000 and the score 2–0.

Bramall Lane was originally a cricket ground and in 1855 it was leased to Sheffield United Cricket Club (founded in 1854) by the Duke of Norfolk. The ground was opened with a cricket match on 30 April 1855 and later became a shared cricket/football venue. After Yorkshire County Cricket Club was founded in 1863, it was their main venue in the nineteenth century. They continued to use the ground for some matches each season until 7 August 1973, after which construction work began to convert Bramall Lane into a specialist football stadium.

The ground has seen expansion in recent years, with the 2006 completion of a 3,000 seat corner stand, Bramall Lane is now an all-seater stadium fit for the Premier League holding 31,884.

In March 2009 the club were officially granted permission to expand the stadium once again, over two phases. The first phase would have seen the Kop being extended to increase the ground's capacity up to approximately 37,000. It would also have seen the removal of the main supporting pillars and a giant screen installed as part of the stand's roof. The second phase would have seen the Valad Stand (formerly Arnold Laver Stand) also extended, bringing the total capacity to a 40,000 all seater. The expansion would also have had a secondary focus of being available for selection for FIFA World Cup matches in 2018 or 2022, if England's bid were to be successful. However, on 16 December 2009 The Football Association announced that should England's 2018/2022 World Cup bid be successful then any games played in Sheffield would be staged at Sheffield Wednesday's Hillsborough Stadium. In light of this United's former chief executive, Trevor Birch, made it known that all planned ground redevelopment had been put on hold until the club was able to regain and maintain Premiership status.

A revised application for the redevelopment of Kop was submitted in 2015, which would see 3,215 seats added to the stand's current capacity. Further plans were revealed in 2017 for the development of the corner between the Kop and South Stand, which would see the construction of residential flats and a new club store.

== Supporters and rivalries ==
Sheffield United derive support from a broad cross-section of the city and its environs, with branches of the official supporters' club running from Swinton, Kiveton Park, Retford, and Eckington. Further afield, supporters groups also exist in Essex, the Republic of Ireland, the Netherlands, and Australia, amongst others.

A 2013 study of posts on social networking site Twitter found that Sheffield United fans had the most positive interactions with the official account of their club out of any in English football. Sheffield United were also found to have the most 'obsessed' fans in the 2006–07 Premier League, with supporters reportedly thinking about the team 110 times a day on average.

United have a number of celebrity supporters including:

- Sean Bean, actor
- Kell Brook, boxer
- Richard Caborn, Labour Party politician
- Joe Elliott, singer-songwriter and musician
- Jessica Ennis-Hill, Olympic gold-medallist
- Flea, singer and actor
- Matt Fitzpatrick, golfer
- Paul Goodison, Olympic gold-medallist
- Paul Heaton, musician
- Mark Labbett, Chaser on TV quiz show The Chase
- Michael Palin, writer and television presenter
- Joe Root, England cricketer
- Juan Sebastián Verón, former Argentina international footballer
- Kevin McCabe, Businessman, property developer and former owner and chairman of Sheffield United F.C.

=== Rivalries ===
Sheffield United have numerous rivalries, mostly with other Yorkshire clubs. The most notable rivalry is with their city neighbours Sheffield Wednesday, with whom they contest the Steel City derby (named after the steel industry for which the city of Sheffield is globally famous).

Sheffield United's next main regional rival is Leeds United from West Yorkshire. This is known as a Yorkshire derby match (the two cities of Sheffield and Leeds are the largest two cities in Yorkshire). Other local rivalries are shared with the professional clubs of South Yorkshire: Barnsley, Doncaster Rovers and Rotherham United. These matches are known as South Yorkshire derbies.

Sheffield United also have a rivalry with Nottingham Forest. This can be attributed to the miners' strikes of the 1980s, where workers in the pits of Nottinghamshire did not join the strike (known locally as scabbing) while miners from Yorkshire did.

West Ham United have also become fierce rivals due to the 'Tevez saga' and the following lawsuit charges.

=== Chants ===
Like many English clubs, Sheffield United supporters have a wide variety of chants and songs. The most famous of these is The Greasy Chip Butty Song, sung to the tune of John Denver's 'Annie's Song'.

== Records and statistics ==
- Record League victory: 10–0 away v Port Vale, Division Two, 10 December 1892 and 10–0 home v Burnley, Division One, 19 January 1929
- Record Cup victory: 6–0 home v Leyton Orient, FA Cup 1st Round 6 November 2016
- Record League defeat: 0–8 home v Newcastle United, Premier League, 24 September 2023
- Record Cup defeat: 0–13 home v Bolton Wanderers, FA Cup 2nd round, 1 February 1890
- Highest home attendance: 68,287 v Leeds United, FA Cup 5th round, 15 February 1936
- Most league appearances: Joe Shaw made 631 appearances between 1948 and 1966
- Most goals scored overall: Harry Johnson scored 201 goals in 313 games between 1919 and 1930
- Most goals scored in a Season: Jimmy Dunne 41 goals from 41 appearances, Division One, 1930–31
- Record Transfer Fee Paid: £23.5 million for Rhian Brewster from Liverpool on 2 October 2020
- Record Transfer Fee Received: £11.5 million for David Brooks to AFC Bournemouth on 1 July 2018

=== League history ===
Chart of table positions of United since joining the Football League

1892–1893 Division 2; 1893–1934 Division 1; 1934–1939 Division 2; 1946–1949 Division 1; 1949–1953 Division 2; 1953–1956 Division 1	1956–1961 Division 2; 1961–1968 Division 1; 1968–1971 Division 2; 1971–1976 Division 1; 1976–1979 Division 2; 1979–1981 Division 3	1981–1982 Division 4; 1982–1984 Division 3; 1984–1988 Division 2; 1988–1989 Division 3; 1989–1990 Division 2; 1990–1992 Division 1	1992–1994 Premier League; 1994–2004 Division 1; 2004–2006 Championship; 2006–2007 Premier League; 2007–2011 Championship; 2011–2017 League One	2017–2019 Championship; 2019–2021 Premier League; 2021–2023 Championship; 2023–2024 Premier League; 2024– Championship

- Seasons spent at Level 1 of the football league system: 62
- Seasons spent at Level 2 of the football league system: 44
- Seasons spent at Level 3 of the football league system: 11
- Seasons spent at Level 4 of the football league system: 1

Sheffield United: League standings for last 10 seasons
Season	League	Pos	P	W	D	L	F	A	Pts
2016–17	League One	1	46	30	10	6	92	47	100
2017–18	Championship	10	46	19	8	15	57	49	65
2018–19	Championship	2	46	26	11	9	78	41	89
2019–20	Premier League	9	38	14	12	12	39	39	54
2020–21	Premier League	20	38	7	2	29	20	63	23
2021–22	Championship	5	46	21	12	13	63	45	75
2022–23	Championship	2	46	28	7	11	73	39	91
2023–24	Premier League	20	38	3	7	28	35	104	16
2024–25	Championship	3	46	28	8	10	63	36	90
2025–26	Championship	13	46	18	6	22	66	66	60

== Players ==
=== First-team squad ===
As of 8 September 2026

Note: Flags indicate national team as defined under FIFA eligibility rules; some limited exceptions apply. Players may hold more than one non-FIFA nationality.

No.	Pos.	Nation	Player
1	GK	ENG	Michael Cooper
2	DF	IRL	Matt Doherty
3	DF	ENG	Sam McCallum
4	MF	ENG	Ollie Arblaster
5	DF	ENG	Japhet Tanganga (captain)
7	MF	ENG	Joe Rothwell
8	MF	BAN	Hamza Choudhury
9	FW	IRL	Tom Cannon
10	FW	GHA	Jordan Ayew
11	FW	ENG	Romelle Donovan (on loan from Brentford)
14	DF	ENG	Harrison Burrows
15	DF	IRL	Liam Kitching (on loan from Coventry City)
16	DF	ENG	Jamie Shackleton
17	GK	WAL	Adam Davies
19	FW	CUW	Tahith Chong

No.	Pos.	Nation	Player
22	FW	CHI	Ben Brereton Díaz (on loan from Southampton)
23	FW	ENG	Tyrese Campbell
25	DF	IRL	Mark McGuinness
26	FW	SCO	Ryan Oné
27	MF	ENG	Kalvin Phillips (on loan from Manchester City)
30	DF	WAL	Rhys Norrington-Davies
31	GK	ENG	Tommy Betts
33	DF	ENG	Jamal Baptiste
38	DF	ENG	Femi Seriki
42	MF	ENG	Sydie Peck
44	MF	NED	Jaïro Riedewald
45	FW	ENG	Patrick Bamford
—	MF	ENG	Billy Blacker
—	GK	ENG	Benjamin Grainger
—	DF	LTU	Dovydas Sasnauskas

=== Out on loan ===
Note: Flags indicate national team as defined under FIFA eligibility rules; some limited exceptions apply. Players may hold more than one non-FIFA nationality.

No.	Pos.	Nation	Player
21	DF	SWE	Nils Zätterström (at Raków Częstochowa until the end of the season)
28	MF	ENG	Alex Matos (at Göztepe until 30 June 2027)
31	MF	ENG	Luke Faxon (at Boston United until 1 January 2027)
34	FW	ENG	Louie Marsh (at Chesterfield until the end of the season)
—	DF	ENG	Max Asante-Boakye (at Matlock Town until 3 October 2026)
—	DF	ENG	Jili Buyabu (at Rotherham United until the end of the season)

No.	Pos.	Nation	Player
—	DF	IRL	Sam Curtis (at Cambridge United until the end of the season)
—	DF	BUL	Mihail Polendakov (at Ludogorets Razgrad until the end of the season)
-	DF	ENG	Sai Sachdev (at Boston United until 4 January 2027)
-	MF	NGR	Ehije Ukaki (at Botev Plovdiv until the end of the season)
—	DF	ENG	Zain Tahir (at Oldham Athletic until the end of the season)

== Player of the Year ==
Last five winners
Year	Position	Name
2021–22	Midfielder	(England) Morgan Gibbs-White
2022–23	Midfielder	(Senegal) Iliman Ndiaye
2023–24	Midfielder	(Netherlands) Gustavo Hamer
2024–25	Goalkeeper	(England) Michael Cooper
2025–26	Midfielder	(England) Callum O'Hare

A 'Player of the Year' award has been presented since 1967 to recognise the player who has made the greatest contribution to the club over the course of the season. Initially organised by the Official Supporters Club the award was voted for by their members although it was presented as an official club award. In recent years the award has been presented at a gala 'End of Season' award ceremony and dinner, usually held at the end of April, and voting has been widened to include a broader section of the club's fanbase. The first winner of the award was long serving goalkeeper Alan Hodgkinson. The player with the most award wins is striker Alan Woodward on four occasions between 1970 and 1978. The longest gap between wins by a player is seven years; Keith Edwards had two spells with the club and won the award during both, in 1977 and 1984. Harry Maguire and Phil Jagielka have won the award on three consecutive occasions. The award was shared between two players for the first time in 2017, with Billy Sharp and John Fleck receiving the award. The award was won by an overseas born player consecutive times for the first time in 2024, Iliman Ndiaye in 2023 and Gustavo Hamer in 2024.

== Development squads and women's team ==
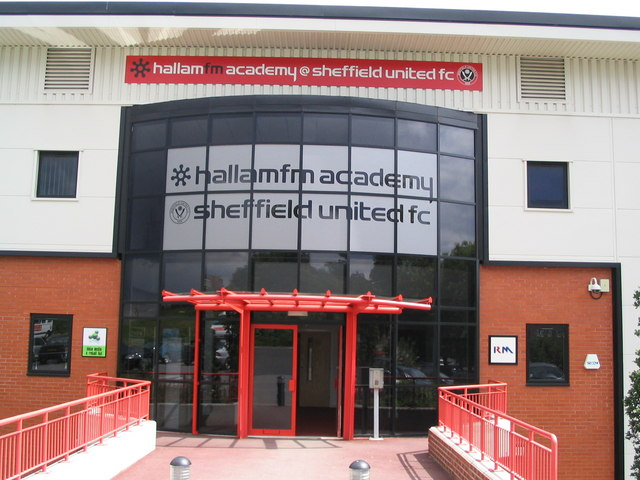
The Sheffield United F.C. Academy & Training ground at Shirecliffe

=== Academy ===
Sheffield United's Academy is responsible for youth development at the club. It has produced such players as Manchester City defender Kyle Walker and defender Phil Jagielka, both England internationals, and also Swansea City defender Kyle Naughton, Burnley full back Matthew Lowton, Manchester United defender and club captain Harry Maguire and current club captain Billy Sharp. The academy building and training facilities in the Sheffield suburb of Shirecliffe were opened in 2002 by then Minister for Sport Richard Caborn. Sheffield United Academy U18s currently play in the Professional Development League at the Shirecliffe ground at Firshill Crescent, and finished as runners-up in the 2011 FA Youth Cup. In addition, SteelPhalt are the sponsor of the Shirecliffe-based Academy, and are also the major sponsor of Sheffield United Women.

=== Under 23s ===
Sheffield United U23s currently compete in the Professional Development League, playing home games at various venues, including Bramall Lane and Stocksbridge Park Steels FC. The club have fielded a reserve team since 1893, when the reserves played in 'Sheffield League Division One'.

=== United Women ===
Sheffield United also have a Women's team, formerly known as Sheffield United Ladies, who play in the FA Women's Championship after having been promoted in the 2017–18 season from the FA Women's National League. Sheffield United Women also have a Development team and numerous junior teams as part of the Regional Talent Club and an additional grassroots arm.

== Management ==
=== Coaching staff and support staff ===
Role	Name
Manager	Chris Wilder
Assistant Manager	Michael Collins
First Team Coach	Matt Prestridge
First Team Coach	Phil Jones
First Team Coach	Gary McSheffrey
Goalkeeping Coach	Matt Duke
Head of Performance	Tom Little
First Team Sport Scientist	Lee McMahon
First Team S&C Coach	Nathan Winder
Head of Recruitment	Mike Allen
Academy Manager	Derek Geary
Lead U21s Coach
Lead U18s Coach	Jim O'Brien
Foundation Phase Lead Coach	Matt Morley
Physiotherapist	Steve Humphries
Kit Manager	Carl Hopwood

=== Owners, directors and executives ===
Role	Name
Owner	COH Sports
Co-chairmen	Steven Rosen; Helmy Eltoukhy
Board of Directors	Steven Rosen; Helmy Eltoukhy; Joe Russo; Len Komoroski; Terry Ahern; Pejman Nozad; Stephen Bettis
Chief Executive Officer	Stephen Bettis
Operations Director	Dave McCarthy
Head of Football Administration	Carl Shieber

== Managers ==
At its formation in 1889 United did not employ what would today be termed a manager, the side was coached by a trainer and a football committee selected the team and decided upon tactics (this was a continuation of the structure of Sheffield United Cricket Club from which the football team had been formed). They did appoint Joseph Wostinholm to the position of club secretary and he was responsible for the day-to-day running of the club, matchday organisation and dealing with players and contracts. Wostinholm oversaw a period of rapid growth for the team, culminating in 1898 when United won their only First Division championship, after which he retired. Wostinholm was replaced by John Nicholson as secretary and he would remain in post for over thirty years until his death in 1932. Nicholson presided over the most successful period in the club's history as United became a leading force in English football, winning the FA Cup four times and regularly challenged at the top of the league but a second Division One title for the club eluded him.

=== A new era ===
Following the death of John Nicholson (who died whilst travelling to an away match in Birmingham) the United board turned to Chesterfield manager Teddy Davison to become the club's first real manager. The team were in decline however and were soon relegated for the first time in their history. Davison gradually rebuilt the side with astute signings and young players and regained top flight status, but the club's post-war financial problems would hamper team building for years to come. Davison retired in 1952 and prompted the club to appoint Rotherham United manager Reg Freeman as his successor. Freeman stabilised the team but fell ill and died in 1955 after which United turned to the inexperienced Joe Mercer but he struggled to cope with a team in decline and departed for Aston Villa in 1958. United then appointed Chester manager John Harris who inherited a talented but under performing side which he transformed into a promotion team, returning to Division One in 1961. Harris built a side based on local players and stabilised them in the top flight but financial issues soon prompted the sale of key players and United were eventually relegated once more. Harris opted to 'move upstairs' to become 'general manager' and handed the role of team manager to Arthur Rowley but he was sacked after one season following disappointing results. Harris returned as manager and guided the side to promotion once more but after a good start back in the top flight Harris' confidence faded and he stepped down in 1973 to 'move upstairs' for the second time.

=== Rapid decline ===
Experienced Blackburn Rovers manager Ken Furphy was the man United turned to replace John Harris. He initially did well but the team was ageing and there was little money to replace players. After a good finish in his first season a disastrous string of results the following year led to Furphy's sacking in October 1975. Jimmy Sirrel was recruited from Notts County but he proved unpopular with both the players and fans and could not halt the decline, overseeing relegation and then being sacked in September 1977 with United at the bottom of Division Two. The ambitious and colourful Harry Haslam was handed the reins and although many of his ideas were ahead of their time he built an ageing side based on 'star' players at the end of their career. Now in the Third Division performances deteriorated still further and Haslam stepped down due to illness in January 1981. World Cup winner and then United player Martin Peters was promoted to the position of manager but United were relegated to Division Four at the end of the season and Peters resigned.

=== Moving on up ===
With a new ambitious board in place United recruited Ian Porterfield as manager in June 1981. He had an immediate impact, winning the Division Four championship in his first season and taking the club back into the second tier two years later on a meagre budget. Despite this many fans were unhappy with the style of football and odd team selections and Porterfield was sacked in 1986 following supporter protests. Coach Billy McEwan was promoted to the position of manager but failed to improve the standard of play and with attendances falling and the team in danger of relegation once more he was sacked in January 1988. United now turned to the colourful character of Dave Bassett who had most recently had a short, unsuccessful spell as manager of Watford. It was to prove an astute appointment as although he could not prevent relegation in his first season he built a solid, hard working team on a small budget and won back to back promotions, returning the club to the top flight and achieving regular mid-table finishes. With the formation of the Premier League United's old financial problems and willingness to sell star players without replacing them meant the side eventually succumbed to relegation and when an immediate return was not forthcoming Basset was sacked in December 1995.

=== Comings and goings ===
The following years proved a turbulent time for United as they chased the ambition of Premiership football. Experienced Howard Kendall was recruited as manager and undertook a complete rebuilding of the side but left in June 1997 to take over at Everton. Player-coach Nigel Spackman was promoted to replace Kendall but after initial promise he quit after only eight months citing boardroom interference. This was to become a recurring theme and replacement Steve Bruce would leave after only one season citing the same reasons. Adrian Heath then proved a disastrous appointment and lasted only six months before being sacked with United looking more likely to be relegated than promoted. The Blades then turned to experienced lower league manager Neil Warnock who managed to stave off relegation and began to rebuild the side on a meagre budget. Warnock proved a divisive figure with fans, but after a number of mid-table finishes he achieved promotion back to the Premiership in 2006. The side were relegated the following season, prompting the board not to renew Warnock's contract.

Just like Adrian Heath, the appointment of Bryan Robson in 2007 proved an unpopular and unsuccessful one and he was sacked after less than a year following poor results and intense fan pressure. Former assistant manager Kevin Blackwell was appointed as Robson's replacement but despite reaching the play-off finals in his first full season, the team was in decline and he was sacked after only two games of the 2010–11 season. Worse was to come, however, as player-coach Gary Speed was briefly promoted to manager but left after only a few months to take over the Welsh national side. Micky Adams then became the third full-time manager of the season, overseeing a disastrous run of results which saw United relegated and Adams sacked after only six months in charge.

With United in the third tier once more, Danny Wilson was appointed as manager in June 2011, despite protests from United fans over his previous association with cross-town rivals Sheffield Wednesday. Wilson guided the club to the League One play-off final in his first full season in charge, only to lose to Huddersfield Town after a famous penalty shootout in which Huddersfield missed their first three penalties. Despite the club challenging for promotion the following season, a poor run of results led to Wilson's departure in April 2013, being replaced by Chris Morgan until the end of the season.

After a long search for a new boss, former Scotland defender David Weir was appointed as Wilson's long-term replacement. Weir's tenure was short-lived however, as he was sacked in October of the same year, having won only one of 13 games in charge. After Chris Morgan had overseen the team for a brief time, Nigel Clough was appointed as Weir's permanent successor in October 2013. Clough guided the Blades to finish seventh in the table narrowly missing the play-offs after having been bottom of the table at the start of February and also led United to an FA Cup semi-final against Hull City which the Blades lost 5–3 after twice taking the lead in the first half.

The following season saw Clough guide the Blades to fifth place in the league, thus qualifying for the play-offs and also led them to a first League Cup semi-final in 12 years, with the Blades ultimately losing to Tottenham Hotspur 3–2 on aggregate. United failed to gain promotion through the play-offs after losing to Swindon Town 2–1 in the first leg and drawing 5–5 in the second leg (7–6 on aggregate).

Following their failure to gain promotion, Clough was sacked on 25 May 2015 and on 2 June 2015, former Scunthorpe United, Southampton and Reading boss Nigel Adkins was appointed as the new Blades manager. However, his appointment only lasted one season as the Blades (who were in 2nd place after the first five matches) ultimately finished in 11th place, the club's lowest finish in the third tier since 1983. Adkins was duly sacked on 12 May 2016.

Atkins was quickly replaced by former Northampton Town manager and former Blades player Chris Wilder, who oversaw United's promotion from League One in 2017, after six years in the division, and its subsequent return to the Premier League in 2019.

United went on to finish ninth in their first season back in the top flight, but the following 2020–21 season was a completely different story. On 13 March 2021, Wilder left the club by mutual consent, with the club bottom of the Premier League, with 14 points from 28 games. U23 coach Paul Heckingbottom took interim charge of the team until the end of the season but United were still relegated.

On 27 May 2021, former Fulham boss Slaviša Jokanović was appointed by United on a three-year deal, becoming the club's first manager from overseas. However he was sacked on 25 November 2021, after United had only won six of 19 Championship games.

Heckingbottom was subsequently appointed manager of Sheffield United, this time on a permanent basis, and eventually guided United to the FA Cup semi-finals in 2023, and back to the Premier League for the 2023–24 season.

United struggled on their return to the Premier League for the 2023–24 season and by early December the team was bottom of the League. Paul Heckingbottom was sacked and replaced by former Blades manager, Chris Wilder.

== Honours ==
League

- First Division (level 1)
  - Champions: 1897–98
  - Runners-up: 1896–97, 1899–1900
- Second Division / Championship (level 2)
  - Champions: 1952–53
  - 2nd place promotion (8): 1892–93, 1938–39, 1960–61, 1970–71, 1989–90, 2005–06, 2018–19, 2022–23
- Third Division / League One (level 3)
  - Champions: 2016–17
  - 2nd place promotion: 1988–89
  - 3rd place promotion: 1983–84
- Fourth Division (level 4)
  - Champions: 1981–82
- Football League North
  - Champions: 1945–46

Sheffield United are the fourth club to have won a championship title in each of England's four professional leagues after Burnley, Preston North End and Wolverhampton Wanderers.

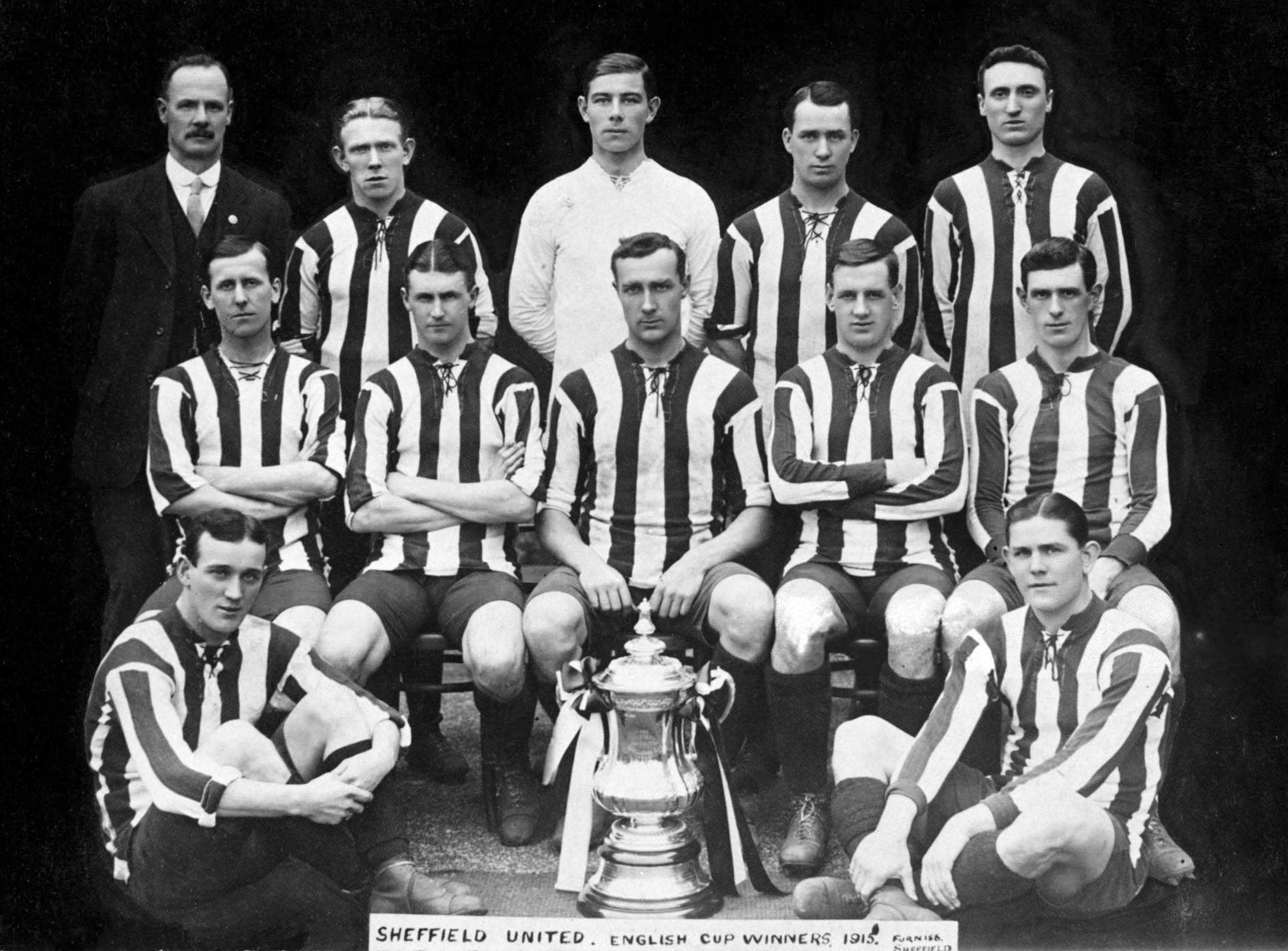
Sheffield United posing with the 1915 FA Cup

Cup

- FA Cup
  - Winners: 1898–99, 1901–02, 1914–15, 1924–25
  - Runners-up: 1900–01, 1935–36
- Sheriff of London Charity Shield
  - Winners: 1898 (shared)

== In media and popular culture ==
BBC Radio Sheffield is the current radio broadcaster of live commentaries of matches within the catchment area of the station. Available on FM Radio frequencies: 88.6 MHz, 94.7 MHz & 104.1 MHz. DAB Radio and Freeview channel 734.

Sheffield United's in-house media label SUTV broadcast matches available to stream through their website.

United were, along with Arsenal, the first team to be featured in a live radio commentary. The Division One fixture between the two sides on 22 January 1927 was broadcast by the BBC. Club captain Billy Gillespie scored United's goal in the 1–1 draw and listeners were provided with a numbered map of the pitch via the Radio Times to aid their understanding of where play was taking place. The area in front of the goalkeeper was numbered 1, with the game providing the first use of the phrase "back to square one."

A number of films and television programmes have included references to Sheffield United:

- 1977 Sheffield United are referenced by Brian Blessed's character in a third series episode of the BBC post-apocalyptic drama series Survivors from the 1970s. Blessed's character also wears a Sheffield United scarf throughout.
- 1990, the BBC produced a six-part documentary series named United that followed the fortunes of the club towards the end of the 1989–90 season, in which they achieved automatic promotion to the top flight of English football.
- 1996 film When Saturday Comes stars real-life United fan Sean Bean as a part-time Hallam FC player who is scouted by Sheffield United, who then goes on to play in a FA Cup semi-final.
- 1997 British comedy film The Full Monty is set in Sheffield and the character Gaz is seen wearing a replica United shirt at one part of the film, and promises his son a ticket for a game at Bramall Lane between Sheffield United and Manchester United.
- 2004 Walt Disney film National Treasure which stars Sean Bean, and Nicolas Cage as the lead character. There is a scene where Bean's character is writing on a yellow notepad. Near the top right corner of the notepad is a doodle of the Sheffield United club emblem, the crossed blades and a dot to represent the Yorkshire rose.
- 2005 film Batman Begins features a child wearing a 1990s Blades shirt.
- 2012 television drama Prisoners' Wives also references the club.

== International links ==
In January 2006, Sheffield United became the first foreign club to take over a Chinese team when they purchased the football club Chengdu F.C., based in the city of Chengdu, China. The club was renamed the Chengdu Blades, after their new owners. Sheffield United shirts were sold in China, and Chengdu shirts were sold in Sheffield, increasing revenue streams for both clubs. United sold on their share of the Chinese side in 2010, following Chengdu's implication in a match-fixing scandal and increasing financial pressures on the English club.

In February 2008, Kevin McCabe, the club's chairman, finalised an agreement with Budapest-based Ferencváros to buy its football team, and also negotiated with the Hungarian government to purchase and develop the ground around Stadion Albert Flórián. A match was played in Budapest to celebrate the link-up. McCabe left the Fenecváros board in January 2011.

The Blades also have operating, business and exchange of ideas links with Central Coast Mariners of Australia and White Star Woluwé of Belgium. In November 2020, they took over the Calicut, Kerala based club Quartz FC which plays in the third tier of Indian Football and rebranded it as Kerala United FC.

=== Affiliated clubs ===
- (Republic of Ireland) Arklow Town
- (Belgium) Beerschot
- (England) Buxton
- (Australia) Central Coast Mariners
- (Argentina) Estudiantes
- (Turkey) Fenerbahce SK
- (Brazil) São Paulo
- (Norway) Strindheim IL
- (Belgium) White Star Woluwé
- (India) Kerala United FC
- (United Arab Emirates) Al Hilal United (2020–present)
- (France) LB Châteauroux (2021–present)

== Bibliography ==
- Clarebrough, Denis (30 September 1997). Sheffield United Football Club. Chalford Publishing. ISBN 0-7524-1059-8.
- Clarebrough, Denis; Kirkham, Andrew (1 January 1999). Sheffield United Football Club 1889–1999: A Complete Record. Sheffield United Football Club. ISBN 978-0950858821.
- Matthews, Tony (15 December 2003). The Official Encyclopaedia of Sheffield United Football Club. Britespot Publishing Ltd. ISBN 1-904103-19-7.
- Pack, Andy; Cookson, Kevin (1 June 2006). Destination Premiership. J W Northend Ltd. ISBN 978-0901100672.
- Armstrong, Gary; Garrett, John (1 December 2007). Sheffield United Football Club – The Biography. Hallamshire Publications Ltd. ISBN 978-1-874718-65-9.
- Phillips, Darren (22 October 2010). The Sheffield United Miscellany. The History Press Ltd. ISBN 978-0752457185.
- Clarebrough, Denis; Kirkham, Andrew (1 September 2012). Sheffield United: The Complete Record. DB Publishing. ISBN 978-1780910192.
- Johnson, Nick (17 September 2012). Match of My Life: Twelve Stars Relive Their Greatest Games Sheffield United. Pitch Publishing Ltd. ISBN 978-1908051721.
- Hall, Danny (8 September 2018). He's One Of Our Own: The Story Of Chris Wilder's Blades Revolution. Vertical Editions. ISBN 978-1908847102.
- Gillan, Don (2 March 2019). Sheffield United Season Scrapbook 1897/98: T'First Proper Champions. Independently Published. ISBN 978-1798567364.
- Allsop, Alan (9 May 2019). You Fill Up My Senses: The Joy and Despair of Following Sheffield United. CreateSpace Independent Publishing Platform. ISBN 978-1097573707.
- Hall, Danny (31 July 2019). 'We're not going to Wembley'. Vertical Editions. ISBN 978-1908847140.
- Anson, Matt (16 September 2019). Greatest Games Sheffield United Blades' Fifty Finest Matches. Pitch Publishing. ISBN 9781785315503.
