= Westfield High School =

Westfield High School may refer to:

- Westfueld High School (Birmingham, Alabama), former high school for African Americans in Westfield, Alabama
- The Westfield School, Perry, Georgia
- Westfield High School (Westfield, Indiana)
- Westfield High School (Massachusetts), Westfield, Massachusetts
- Westfield Technical Academy, Westfield, Massachusetts
- Westfield High School (New Jersey)
- Westfield High School (Harris County, Texas)
- Westfield High School (Virginia)
- Westfields Sports High School, Sydney, Australia
- West Field High School, Taylor, UT, USA

== See also ==
- Westfield School (disambiguation)
- Westfield Schools (disambiguation)
