= Westfield Township =

Westfield Township may refer to:

== Illinois ==
- Westfield Township, Bureau County, Illinois
- Westfield Township, Clark County, Illinois

== Iowa ==
- Westfield Township, Fayette County, Iowa
- Westfield Township, Plymouth County, Iowa

== Minnesota ==
- Westfield Township, Dodge County, Minnesota

== North Carolina ==
- Westfield Township, Surry County, North Carolina

== North Dakota ==
- Westfield Township, Steele County, North Dakota, in Steele County, North Dakota

== Ohio ==
- Westfield Township, Medina County, Ohio
- Westfield Township, Morrow County, Ohio

== Pennsylvania ==
- Westfield Township, Pennsylvania

== See also ==
- Westfield (disambiguation)
