= Westfield Schools =

Westfield Schools may refer to:

- The Westfield School, a private PK-12 school in Perry, Georgia, United States.
- Westfield Public Schools, a public school district in Union County, New Jersey, United States.

== See also ==
- Westfield Schools (disambiguation)
- Westfield High School (disambiguation)
