= Trevor Birch =

English footballer (born 1958)

Personal information
- Date of birth: 16 February 1958 (age 68)
- Place of birth: Liverpool, England
- Position: Midfielder

Youth career
- 1974–1979: Liverpool

Senior career*
Years	Team	Apps	(Gls)
1979–1980	Shrewsbury Town	25	(4)
1980–1981	Chester	31	(0)
1981–1982	Marine		
1982–1983	Runcorn	31	(2)
1987–1988	Northwich Victoria	6	(0)
- * Club domestic league appearances and goals

Trevor Birch (born 16 February 1958) is an English chartered accountant, football executive, and former professional footballer. He is chief executive of the English Football League. Birch has been an executive at several clubs, including Tottenham Hotspur, Swansea City, Chelsea, Leeds United, Everton, Derby County, and Sheffield United. Birch has worked at Ernst & Young, BDO International, and Duff & Phelps.

== Playing career ==
Birch started out as an apprentice footballer aged 16 when he joined Liverpool in 1974. He left to join Shrewsbury Town in 1979 for a then club record fee of £50,000. He also had a brief spell at Chester after which he retired from playing professionally. He then enrolled at Liverpool Polytechnic aged 24 and gained a first class degree in Accountancy before qualifying as a chartered accountant with Ernst & Young. He also continued to play semi-professionally with clubs including Marine, Runcorn, and Northwich Victoria.

== Financial career ==
In 2002, Birch left Ernst & Young to become chief executive of Chelsea, where he led the £180 million sale to Roman Abramovich in 2003. After the sale, Birch chose not to stay at the club and in October that year was appointed Chief Executive of Leeds United, overseeing the takeover by a local consortium. He then moved to Everton in June 2004 to become chief executive. Birch was given the task of overhauling the Merseyside club's finances, but resigned after a disagreement over strategy with the board and major shareholders.

Since then Birch has been a partner at Deloitte, and held chief executive roles at Derby County and Sheffield United. He was Chief Operating Officer of Sportfive, the largest football rights agency in Europe, until 2009.

He returned to the accountancy profession in 2011 and undertook the role of administrator at financially troubled Portsmouth. Under his stewardship the club was sold to the Pompey Supporters' Trust, with Birch performing a similar feat as administrator at Heart of Midlothian in 2013. He subsequently undertook an advisory role to the Board at Bolton Wanderers in late 2015 which finished in March 2016 on the sale of the club.

He joined the global valuation and corporate finance advisors Duff & Phelps as a managing director in January 2017, having previously led the professional sports group at global advisory firm BDO International.

In March 2017 Portsmouth confirmed that they had retained the services of Mr. Birch during a period of negotiations with Mike Eisner and his investment vehicle Tornante regarding a takeover of the club.

He became chairman of Swansea City on 18 March 2019.

He became Director of Football at Tottenham on 1 September 2020. He left to join the English Football League as chief executive in January 2021.
