= Westfield, West Virginia =

Unincorporated community in West Virginia, US

Coordinates: 39°06′20″N 80°27′19″W

Westfield is an unincorporated community in Lewis County, in the U.S. state of West Virginia.

Westfield was founded in 1817.
