= Arnold Laver =

British timber merchant

Arnold Laver & Co Ltd
- Type: Privately held company
- Industry: Timber
- Founded: 1920
- Founder: Arnold Laver
- Headquarters: Sheffield, United Kingdom
- Number of locations: 15 timber depots in the UK
- Area served: United Kingdom
- Key people: Patrick Guest (managing director)
- Services: Importer and distributor of timber and timber-based products
- Revenue: £139 million (2018)
- Owner: Cairngorm Capital
- Number of employees: 750 (2018)
- Website: laver.co.uk

Arnold Laver was a British timber merchant based in Sheffield, United Kingdom. At its height, the company was one of the largest timber merchants trading in the UK, operating 15 timber depots across the UK and employed almost 700 people.

== History ==
The business was founded in 1920 by Arnold Laver, a veteran of the First World War. Together with his brother James (known as Jim) and using a hand cart, Laver's initial business model involved customers paying in advance for the wood, which was then purchased and delivered to their premises. In its first year, Laver made enough money to buy a horse, named Charlie, to help with the deliveries. In 1925, Arnold Laver began negotiations to purchase a much larger site on Bramall Lane; two years later, the new Olympic Sawmills opened. This site became the company's head office in later years, with the main depot moving to the old goods-yard off Queens road as the firm expanded.

The saw mill on Bramall Lane/Shoreham Street has been redeveloped as Arnold Laver's new head office and Anchor Point, a residential complex, which has been built above the offices on the site of the old offices and saw mill. The site is next door to Sheffield United's ground and their hotel development, the company being the club's primary sponsor from 1985 until 1995. The company also redeveloped its site on Queens Road in 2002 and it is now occupied by a B&Q superstore. The Olympic sawmill and trade outlet moved to a new site at Mosborough.

The company supplied timber and timber based products to a wide range of customers and sectors, including many of the largest civil engineers, the Ministry of Defence, shop-fitters and supplied 50 percent of all the timber and sheet materials used in building the 2012 Summer Olympics venues. A large proportion of its timber was sourced from Eastern Europe.

In 1960, Arnold Laver & Co Ltd diversified and established Laver Leisure, a series of holiday home park in and around Skegness, with over 1,400 seasonal holiday homes across 11 different parks.

In the mid-2000s, the company recorded record-breaking profits; this was attributed to a recent investment strategy focused on its production facilities.

In December 2007, the company underwent a management buy-in, led by the founder's grandson, Andrew Laver (managing director), Mark Bower (finance director) and the senior management team who were joined by Nigel Petrie, the buy-in candidate and non-executive director. The management acquired the company from the Laver family trust, with financing provided by Yorkshire Bank.

Following the onset of the Great Recession, the firm opted to favour its activities in the leisure and property markets over the weakened private construction sector.

In July 2016, one of the company's warehouses in Sheffield caught fire; six fire crews were deployed to contain the blaze and avert more serious losses.

In November 2018, the British private equity firm Cairngorm Capital acquired Arnold Laver as part of its buy-and-build strategy to create The National Timber Group. This group was formed with the aim of consolidating the highly fragmented specialist UK timber merchant market. Arnold Laver's previous shareholders retained ownership of the company's existing property and leisure interests.

In November 2025, following a period of economic hardship and the accumulation of £17 million in debt, Arnold Laver entered into administration; 561 staff were instantly made redundant and 13 of the group branches were closed, the remaining staff and branches continued to trade while a buyer was sought for the company. Over the following six months, several branches were sold off to competing firms, such as Premier Forest Products and Howarth Timber & Building Supplies; this approach has reportedly saved at least 160 jobs.

== Depots ==
The company operated numerous locations across the UK:

- Borehamwood
- Bradford
- Bristol
- Hull
- Kidderminster
- Leeds
- London
- Manchester
- Newcastle
- Oldbury, West Midlands
- Peterborough
- Reading
- Sheffield Central
- Sheffield mama
