= Westfield (surname) =

Westfield is an English surname. Notable people with the surname include:

- Bob Westfield (1907–1970), New Zealand-born Australian rugby union player
- Ernest Westfield (1939–2020), American baseball player
- Frankie Westfield (born 2005), American soccer player
- Mervyn Westfield (born 1988), English cricketer
- Robert Westfield (born 1972), American writer
- Thomas Westfield (1573–1644), Bishop of Bristol, member of the Westminster Assembly

== Fictional characters ==
- Paul Westfield, a DC Comics character

== See also ==
- Charles Westfield Coker (born 1933), the former president and CEO of Sonoco Products Company of Hartsville, South Carolina, US
