= Westfield, Illinois =

Westfield
- Village
- Location of Westfield in Clark County, Illinois.
- Coordinates: 39°27′20″N 87°59′57″W
- Country: United States
- State: Illinois
- County: Clark

Area
  - Total: 0.98 sq mi (2.53 km^{2})
  - Land: 0.98 sq mi (2.53 km^{2})
  - Water: 0 sq mi (0.00 km^{2})
- Elevation: 764 ft (233 m)

Population (2020)
  - Total: 536
  - Density: 547.9/sq mi (211.54/km^{2})
- Time zone: UTC-6 (CST)
  - Summer (DST): UTC-5 (CDT)
- ZIP Code(s): 62474
- Area code: 217
- FIPS code: 17–80281
- GNIS feature ID: 2400151
- Website: westfieldillinois.com

Westfield is a village in Westfield Township, Clark County, Illinois, United States. The population was 536 at the 2020 census, down from 601 at the 2010 census.

== History ==
The village of Westfield was laid out in 1839, and a post office opened there on June 18, 1840. The community did not incorporate until August 31, 1875. Westfield College operated here from 1865 until 1914. The school was founded by the Church of the United Brethren in Christ in 1861 as a seminary, then was incorporated as a coeducational college in 1865. The peak enrollment was 160, in 1909. However, enrollment declined sharply thereafter, and financial problems forced the school to close in 1914. The building was used as the Westfield Township high school from 1914 until being destroyed by fire in 1917.

== Geography ==
According to the 2021 census gazetteer files, Westfield has a total area of 0.98 square miles (2.54 km^{2}), all land.

== Demographics ==
Historical population
Census	Pop.	Note	%±
1880	647		—
1890	510		−21.2%
1900	820		60.8%
1910	927		13.0%
1920	933		0.6%
1930	646		−30.8%
1940	678		5.0%
1950	661		−2.5%
1960	636		−3.8%
1970	678		6.6%
1980	733		8.1%
1990	676		−7.8%
2000	678		0.3%
2010	601		−11.4%
2020	536		−10.8%
U.S. Decennial Census

As of the 2020 census there were 536 people, 248 households, and 154 families residing in the village. The population density was 548.06 inhabitants per square mile (211.61/km^{2}). There were 250 housing units at an average density of 255.62 units per square mile (98.70 units/km^{2}). The racial makeup of the village was 97.01% White, 0.93% African American, 0.19% Native American, and 1.87% from two or more races. Hispanic or Latino of any race were 0.75% of the population.

There were 248 households, out of which 27.8% had children under the age of 18 living with them, 49.19% were married couples living together, 4.44% had a female householder with no husband present, and 37.90% were non-families. 33.87% of all households were made up of individuals, and 24.19% had someone living alone who was 65 years of age or older. The average household size was 2.79 and the average family size was 2.30.

The village's age distribution consisted of 20.0% under the age of 18, 10.2% from 18 to 24, 14.8% from 25 to 44, 28.3% from 45 to 64, and 26.8% who were 65 years of age or older. The median age was 48.0 years. For every 100 females, there were 104.3 males. For every 100 females age 18 and over, there were 115.1 males.

The median income for a household in the village was $53,421, and the median income for a family was $54,605. Males had a median income of $32,794 versus $22,411 for females. The per capita income for the village was $26,040. About 4.5% of families and 6.8% of the population were below the poverty line, including 4.4% of those under age 18 and 9.2% of those age 65 or over.

=== Schools ===
Westfield is part of the Casey-Westfield School District. The district has two buildings all in the city of Casey, IL. Monroe Elementary (K-6) and Casey-Westfield Jr-Sr High School (7–12).

=== Churches ===
Westfield is served by two churches. The Westfield United Methodist Church is the result of the merger of the Methodist Church and the Evangelical United Brethren (EUB) Church in 1968. The new church uses the building built by the EUB church in 1918 at the corner of Madison and Elm Streets. The Westfield Baptist Church has moved into the former Methodist Church building at the corner of State and Fulton Streets. The original wood frame Baptist Church building has been converted to a private home.
