= Westfield Township, Clark County, Illinois =

Westfield Township
- Township
- Location in Clark County

- Clark County's location in Illinois
- Coordinates: 39°27′31″N 87°57′38″W
- Country: United States
- State: Illinois
- County: Clark
- Established: November 7, 1854

Area
  - Total: 17.8 sq mi (46 km^{2})
  - Land: 17.79 sq mi (46.1 km^{2})
  - Water: 0.01 sq mi (0.026 km^{2}) 0.06%
- Elevation: 679 ft (207 m)

Population (2020)
  - Total: 658
  - Density: 37.0/sq mi (14.3/km^{2})
- Time zone: UTC-6 (CST)
  - Summer (DST): UTC-5 (CDT)
- ZIP codes: 61933, 62442, 62474
- FIPS code: 17-023-80294

Westfield Township is one of fifteen townships in Clark County, Illinois, USA. As of the 2020 census, its population was 658 and it contained 306 housing units.

== Geography ==
According to the 2010 census, the township has a total area of 17.8 square miles (46 km^{2}), of which 17.79 square miles (46.1 km^{2}) (or 99.94%) is land and 0.01 square miles (0.026 km^{2}) (or 0.06%) is water.

=== Cities, towns, villages ===
- Westfield

=== Cemeteries ===
The township contains these four cemeteries: Conrad Baptist, Good Hope, Maple Hill and Methodist.

=== Major highways ===
- Illinois Route 49

== Demographics ==
As of the 2020 census there were 658 people, 308 households, and 202 families residing in the township. The population density was 37.02 inhabitants per square mile (14.29/km^{2}). There were 306 housing units at an average density of 17.22 per square mile (6.65/km^{2}). The racial makeup of the township was 97.57% White, 0.76% African American, 0.15% Native American, 0.00% Asian, 0.00% Pacific Islander, 0.00% from other races, and 1.52% from two or more races. Hispanic or Latino of any race were 0.61% of the population.

There were 308 households, out of which 27.60% had children under the age of 18 living with them, 55.19% were married couples living together, 3.57% had a female householder with no spouse present, and 34.42% were non-families. 28.90% of all households were made up of individuals, and 19.50% had someone living alone who was 65 years of age or older. The average household size was 2.33 and the average family size was 2.77.

The township's age distribution consisted of 20.0% under the age of 18, 8.1% from 18 to 24, 14.7% from 25 to 44, 28.9% from 45 to 64, and 28.2% who were 65 years of age or older. The median age was 47.9 years. For every 100 females, there were 109.6 males. For every 100 females age 18 and over, there were 108.3 males.

The median income for a household in the township was $58,095, and the median income for a family was $63,542. Males had a median income of $34,943 versus $23,167 for females. The per capita income for the township was $28,057. About 3.5% of families and 5.4% of the population were below the poverty line, including 3.5% of those under age 18 and 6.9% of those age 65 or over.

Historical population
Census	Pop.	Note	%±
2010	720		—
2020	658		−8.6%
U.S. Decennial Census

== School districts ==
- Casey-Westfield Community Unit School District 4c

== Political districts ==
- Illinois' 15th congressional district
- State House District 109
- State Senate District 55
