= Westfield Health =

British health and wellbeing company

- Industry: Health and Wellbeing, Insurance
- Founded: 1919
- Headquarters: Sheffield, UK
- Website: www.westfieldhealth.com

Formed in 1919, Westfield Health is a British health and wellbeing company, which provides wellbeing services, mental health support, gym management and health insurance. Westfield Health works in partnership with academics at the Advanced Wellbeing Research Centre.

== Background ==
Westfield Health has donated more than 15 million dollars to the NHS and other charities since 1996.

In January 2020, Westfield Health acquired European fitness and wellbeing firm High Five Health Promotion. This was the group's third acquisition in two years following previous acquisitions of a wellbeing firm and a cash plan provider UK Healthcare.

The group's headquarters are in Sheffield, UK.

== Awards ==
In 2005, Westfield Health won the ‘Best Health Cash Plan Provider’ and 'Winner of the Health Insurance' awards for two years. The company's two main offerings, the Good4You Plan for individuals and the Advantage Plan for company staff, were both relaunched with new and updated features.

In September 2016, Westfield Health won the ‘Best Health Cash Plan Provider’ award in the Moneyfacts Awards 2016 for a fifth consecutive year. The company also introduced the Hospital Treatment Insurance category to the sector, which provides cover for private treatment for a range of non-urgent surgical and medical procedures.

== See also ==
- Private healthcare in the United Kingdom
