= The Westfield School =

Private Christian school in Perry, Georgia, United States

Location
- Perry, Georgia, Georgia; 32.4388812°N 83.7620221°W

Information
- Former name: Perry Christian Day School; Westfield Schools
- Type: Private
- Founded: 1969; 57 years ago
- Headmaster: Mr William Carrol
- Grades: PK-12
- Campus size: 28-acre (11 ha)
- Mascot: Buzz the Hornet
- Website: www.westfieldschool.org
- Last updated: 8 January 2018

The Westfield School is a private Christian school in Perry, Georgia, United States. It is located off U.S. Highway 41 South. It educates students in grades PK-12, in three schools.

The Westfield School was originally founded as the Perry Christian Day School as part of the segregation academy movement against the federal court-ordered integration of Houston County public schools.

== History ==
Perry Christian Day School was established in 1969 as a segregation academy. It changed its name to the Westfield Schools in 1971 and to the Westfield School in 2007.

The lower school, middle school, high school, arts and sciences building, administrative building, and another building that houses the cafeteria, gym, weight room, coaches' offices, dressing rooms, and a computer lab are all part of the 28-acre (11 ha) campus.
