= History of Sheffield United F.C. =

History of an English football club

The history of Sheffield United Football Club, an English football club based in Sheffield, dates back to the club's formation in 1889.

== Formative years ==
Sheffield United Football Club was formed at Bramall Lane on 22 March 1889 by the Sheffield United Cricket Club at the suggestion of its president, Sir Charles Clegg. Clegg was a famous local sportsman, Chairman of the Sheffield FA and also chairman of Sheffield Wednesday, who had been the tenants at Bramall Lane from 1881 to 1887 but had vacated after a dispute over rent. Due to the lost revenue the decision was taken to form a football branch of the Cricket club thus United were established.

The Sheffield United cricket club itself had been going at Bramall Lane since 1854 and was the first English sports club to use United in its name after a number of local clubs were unable to self-sustain and merged. It has been suggested that some of The Blades original players came from an earlier amateur side called Norfolk F.C., who played in the Youdan Cup.

The team was formed six days after a crowd of 22,688 paid to watch the FA Cup semi-final played at Bramall Lane between Preston North End and West Bromwich Albion, with gate receipts of £574. Charles Stokes, a member of the Ground Committee saw the financial possibilities of a permanent football team and they were a professional club almost from the start. They played their first game against Notts Rangers of the Midland Counties League on 7 September 1889 losing 4–1 at Meadow Lane. Their first game at Bramall Lane did not come until 28 September 1889 against Birmingham St George's of the Football Alliance which they also lost 4–0.

United's first season was composed of friendlies and local cup matches, but notable for them reaching the second round of the FA Cup at their first attempt by beating Football League side Burnley 2–1 at home. However, the next cup game against Bolton Wanderers gave United their record defeat 13–0 and persuaded the committee that regular competitive league games were required.

They joined the Midland Counties League for the 1890–91 season, finishing fifth. This season was the first time that the club introduced a red stripe to their shirts, having played their first season in all-white shirts. Unhappy at being overlooked for the Football Alliance and no longer satisfied with the Midland, they then competed the following season in the Northern League finishing third. At the end of the season they applied to join the Football League First Division, which was expanding from 14 to 16 clubs for the 1892 season, but polled only 5 votes and were instead admitted as one of the twelve founder members of the Second Division with the Alliance clubs, replacing Birmingham St George's which had folded.

== The glory years (1890s–1930s) ==
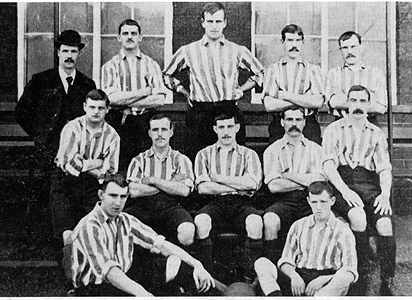
The Sheffield United team in 1895

United made waves straight away by securing promotion to the First Division in 1892–93, after finishing second to Small Heath and beating Accrington 1–0 in the Test Match on 22 April.

United enjoyed an unbroken 37-season spell in the top flight (which remains a record for a newly promoted team) winning the League Championship in 1897–98 and were runners up in 1896–97 and 1899–1900. After the League Championship, United played and won an unofficial two-legged "Champions of Great Britain" title against Celtic, who had won that year's Scottish League Championship. Despite this, the 1898–99 season was one of struggle, when United finished 16th out of 18, just one place above the (at the time) two relegation places – the first poor title defence in English League history.

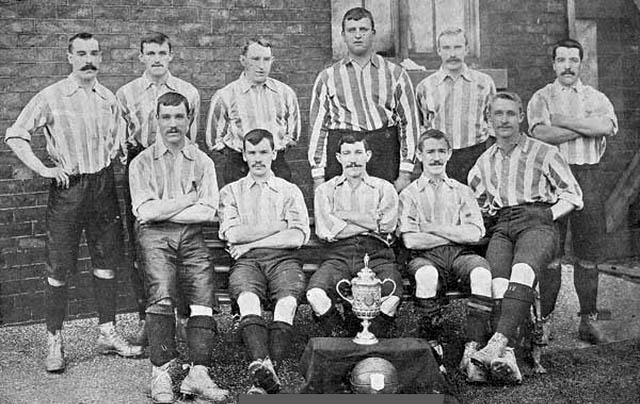
The 1899 team that won the FA Cup

They won their first FA Cup Final on 15 April 1899, beating Derby County 4–1 at Crystal Palace, returning to the London venue to play Tottenham Hotspur on 20 April 1901. Despite Spurs being a Southern League club, they took The Blades to a replay with a 1–1 draw. Seven days later, at Burnden Park in Bolton, the London side won 3–1 in the replay.

United returned to Crystal Palace the following year on 19 April 1902, and were again taken to a replay. This time Southampton (also from the Southern League) drew 1–1 but the replay exactly a week later, on the same ground was won 2–1 by the Blades.

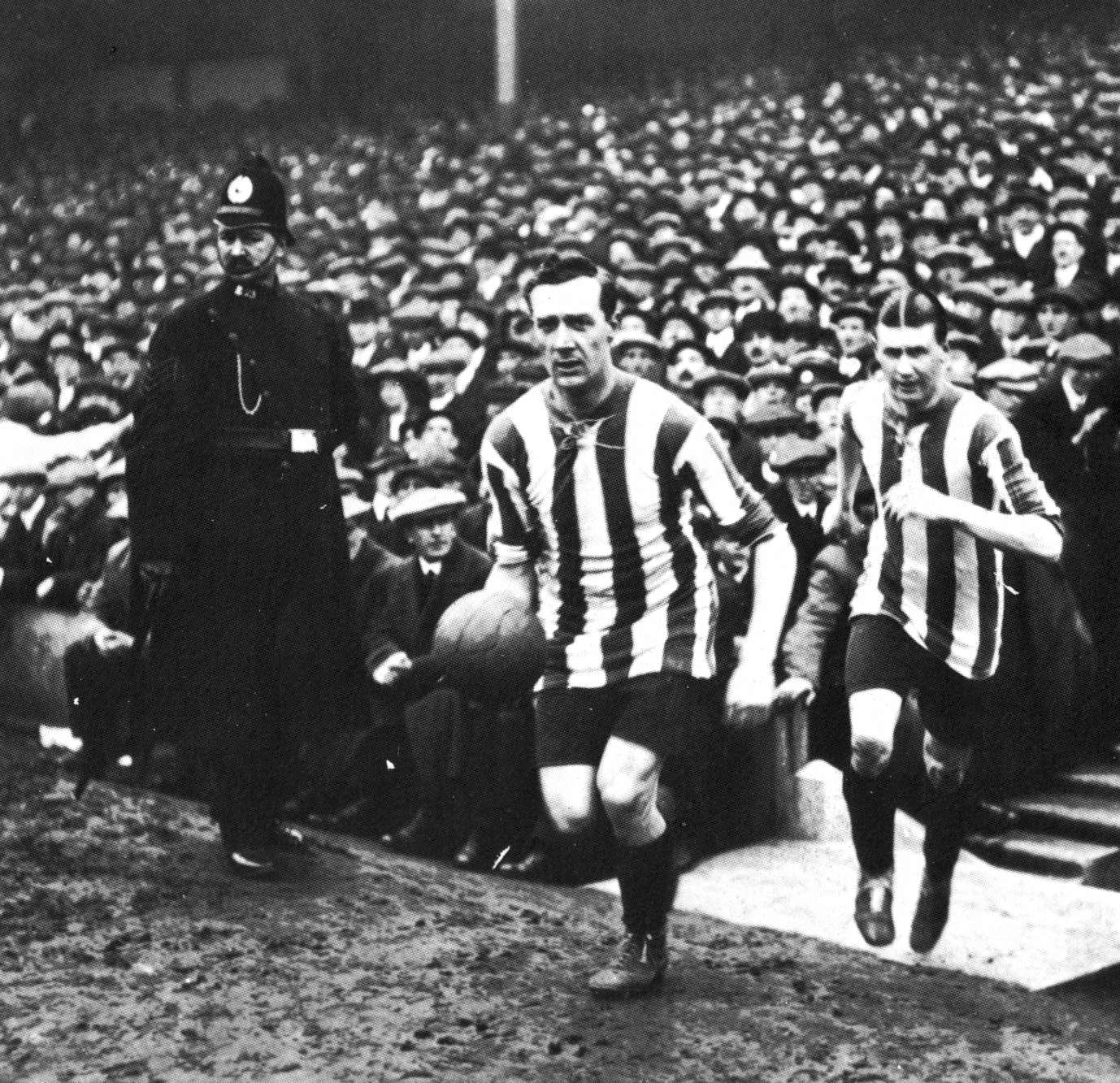
Captain George Utley leads Sheffield United out for the 1915 FA Cup final

The next final appearance came on 24 April 1915 at Old Trafford when United beat Chelsea 3–0 to win "The Khaki Cup final", the last game before the Football League and FA Cup competition was suspended until the end of the First World War.

The fourth and final win came with their first Wembley Cup Final, beating Cardiff City 1–0 on 25 April 1925. Their last appearance in a final came on 25 April 1936, losing 1–0 to Arsenal.

== Disappointment and relegation (late 1930s) ==
After several close shaves – including the 1898–99 title defence mentioned above, 1919–20, when they won just 6 matches, and 1929–30, when a 5–1 win at Old Trafford on the final day pulled them out of the bottom spot – they finished bottom of the First Division in 1934 and were relegated for the first time.

A contributing factor to relegation was the decision to sell Irish centre forward Jimmy Dunne, who scored over 140 goals for the club in just six seasons, to Arsenal early in the 1933–4 season. Dunne scored over 30 top division goals in each of 3 consecutive seasons between 1930–1 and 1932–3, a feat which was not performed again until Alan Shearer managed it in 1993–96. This included 41 goals in 1930–31, which remains the club record and also the record single season tally by an Irishman.

During the 1920s United equalled their record victory with a 10–0 home win against Burnley in January 1930, and also beat Cardiff City 11–2 in 1926. Their record league defeat, 3–10 at Middlesbrough, occurred in their relegation season.

They fell just short in promotion battles in 1936 and 1938 – finishing third in the Second Division on each occasion – but it was third time lucky when they pipped local rivals Sheffield Wednesday for second spot in 1939, winning their last game 6–1 against Tottenham. They started the 1939–40 season brightly before World War II curtailed the campaign.

== Post-war (1940s–1950s) ==
The restart of League competition after the war came a year too late for The Blades as they won League North – a regional competition featuring the Northern clubs from the top two Divisions – in 1945–46. This good form carried over into the following year with a 6th-place finish, combined with reaching the FA Cup Quarter-finals.

This good form was not to last, as the club were relegated again in 1948–49, and suffered the agony of missing out on an instant promotion the following season when Wednesday gained revenge for 1939 and pipped them for second place and promotion on goal average with a 0–0 draw at home to Tottenham Hotspur when a scoring draw or defeat would have sent The Blades up instead.

After a couple of middling seasons, featuring many goals (including 7–3 and 3–1 wins against the Owls in the Steel City Derby 1951–2), but inconsistent results, Teddy Davison ended his 20-year managerial career at the Lane. He was replaced by Reg Freeman, who guided the Blades to the Second Division Championship in 1952–53, scoring 97 goals along the way. Two seasons of struggle, but survival, in the First Division followed before Freeman died in the summer of 1955. His replacement, Joe Mercer, was unable to stave off relegation in 1956.

== Revival (1960s–mid 1970s) ==
Mercer left the club in 1958 to join Aston Villa (who were promptly relegated) and was replaced by former Chelsea captain John Harris, who inherited a team with a backbone of good homegrown talent, including Joe Shaw, a centre half who played over 600 games for the club, and Alan Hodgkinson, a young goalkeeper capped five times by England (he remains England's youngest ever goalkeeper) who also went on to play over 600 league games, and half-back Graham Shaw. The team was always in the promotion frame and had some good cup runs, reaching the quarter-finals in 1959 and 1960, and finally achieved promotion in 1961 as runners up to Ipswich Town. In the same season, they reached the FA Cup semi finals but went down 0–2 to Leicester City in a second replay after two scoreless draws.

Sheffield United's most memorable post-war run was in 1971, where they ended the season with six victories and five draws to win promotion from Division Two. The following season United took the First Division by storm. Led by such players as Tony Currie, Alan Woodward, Eddie Colquhoun, Len Badger, Ted Hemsley, Trevor Hockey, Alan Hodgkinson, Gil Reece and Bill Dearden they played the first ten games without defeat, recording eight victories and two draws. With one League Cup victory during this period, United had an unbeaten run of 22 matches. They finally lost the top spot in Division One in a memorable encounter with Manchester United at Old Trafford on 2 October 1971, The Blades losing out 2–0 on that occasion. The memorable goal scored by George Best six minutes from the end is still replayed on television to this day.

The remarkable success in the early 1970s brought to a head the long-standing argument about the desirability of playing football and cricket at the same ground and a decision was taken to build a new stand to provide a fourth side to what was essentially a three-sided stadium. This stand (originally known as 'The South Stand') with a seating capacity of 7746 people, was opened in 1975.

== Lower division football (late 1970s–late 1980s) ==
Unfortunately, the completion of the new stand coincided with a slump in fortunes on the field, despite the team finishing that season sixth in Division One. The failure to qualify for the UEFA Cup by one point after failing to beat Birmingham City at St Andrew's in the final game of the season was followed by relegation to the Second Division in 1976.

Relegation was a financial disaster, and the drop in season ticket sales meant limited funds for strengthening the team. The club's bank was reluctant to give additional loans on top of the debt on the new South Stand. Revenue from the transfer of club legend Tony Currie and season ticket sales was quickly swallowed up and the bank declined to make further loans unless they could be underwritten by personal guarantees from Board members.

Jimmy Sirrel left on 27 September 1977, with United next to bottom of the Second Division, and was replaced on a temporary basis by Cec Coldwell who had previously taken control between the reign of John Harris and Ken Furphy. Results picked up but the lack of funds for new players was matched by the lack of reserve players suitable for the step up to the first team.

A bad run in January led to the appointment of Harry Haslam, a 'wheeler dealer' who had successfully managed a Luton Town side in similar circumstances for nine years. "Happy Harry" brought in Danny Bergara, a Uruguayan as Assistant Manager.

With a reputation for finding talent, Haslam brought in a number of players, most notably Alex Sabella but was forced to sell promising players such as Keith Edwards, Imre Varadi and Simon Stainrod. Alan Woodward left for the United States as did Bruce Rioch whose short loan spell brought a mini-revival in the club's fortunes.

The 1978–79 season ended with relegation to the Third Division. United's first ever season outside the top two divisions started promisingly, but their early form soon burned out, and the team spent the rest of the season in mid-table, never threatening the promotion places. 1980–81 saw another good start, with the team at the top of the table at Christmas. Haslam's health started to fail at this point though, and he was eventually forced to stand down in mid-January. 1966 World Cup winner Martin Peters succeeded him, but then the team went into free fall, winning only three of the last sixteen games and were relegated to the Fourth Division. The 1981 relegation came as a result of a last minute miss from a penalty kick in the final game of the season against Walsall, who would have been relegated instead had the kick (by Don Givens) been successful.

Having dropped to the lowest level, United appointed Ian Porterfield from neighbours Rotherham United to help them start the recovery, and with investment from a willing boardroom, United went on to become Fourth Division Champions in 1982, with 92 points – a new record due to the change of 3 points being awarded for a win in the 1981–82 season. United's top goalscorer that season was Keith Edwards, re-signed from Hull City, who linked up well with Bob Hatton, and later that season, Colin Morris (signed from Blackpool), who was to become part of a renowned partnership that would delight Bramall Lane crowds well into the mid-1980s. Edwards won an Adidas Golden Boot for his contribution – his 35 goals being a large part of United's success. The Golden Boot is now on show at United's "Legends of the Lane" exhibition.

United's promotion in 1982 saw them initially struggle in the Third Division, and finish in the lower reaches of the league in the 1982–83 season. By applying themselves to the cause, along with a number of additions to the side, including the signings of Paul Stancliffe and Glenn Cockerill from Lincoln City, the 1983–84 season saw the Blades cruise into the top 3 – which they would not drop out of all season. They were challenged for the promotion spots by Hull City, who by their final match were 3 goals behind them and 3 points behind. Hull's final match of that season was on a weekday at Burnley, and the Tigers went into the game knowing that 3 goals would be enough. Many United fans travelled to Turf Moor for the game, and were biting their nails when Hull cruised into a 2-goal lead, but try as they may, City could not find a third and United were up again to Division 2 – their second promotion in 3 seasons. Keith Edwards was top goalscorer again this season.

United seemed content to bide their time in the Second Division, but scared fans initially by finishing 18th in season 1984–85 in a poor first season back. Further financial backing saw Porterfield and the Blades make a push for promotion in season 1985–86, when manager Porterfield went for experience to get the Blades up, signing veterans Ken McNaught, Peter Withe, Phil Thompson and Ray Lewington. This led the Blades to gain the nickname "Dad's Army" because of the combined ages of the 4 players signed (they were all in their 30s). Fans were unhappy that crowd favourite Edwards was dropped to the bench in favour of his "aged" colleagues. United's start was actually very bright that season however, and after a 3–0 win away to early season promotion favourites Portsmouth, were fancied for another climb to the top tier. However, injury and bad results saw the club's fortunes falter, and the crowd's anger turn on Porterfield, who after a 5–2 defeat to Norwich, was sacked after a car-park demonstration.

Although linked with a number of high-profile managers, United promoted from within, and made Youth Team manager Billy McEwan first team manager in March 1986. Although he soon restored Edwards to the side, the talented forward became disillusioned, and at the end of the 1985–86 season, left for rivals Leeds United for £125,000, and the club finished in 7th position.

McEwan's first full season in charge saw the Blades finish in a disappointing 9th place, but saw the Blades debut of future Manchester City, Everton and Bradford City player, Peter Beagrie, signed from Middlesbrough. The following season saw him trying to mix youth with talent, by giving debuts to future Blackburn star Chris Marsden and to Charlton Athletic and Grimsby Town legend Clive Mendonca, but results saw the club drop into the bottom half of the table, and McEwan tendered his resignation on New Years Day 1988 after an embarrassing 5–0 defeat at home to Oldham Athletic.

Danny Bergara took charge as Caretaker Manager again for the match against Maidstone United in the FA Cup in January 1988, but at the following away game at Bournemouth in the League, a manager who'd recently resigned from his role at Watford was spotted taking more than a passing interest in the action on the pitch. Three days later, he became manager. That man was Dave Bassett ...

== Dave Bassett era (1988–1995) ==
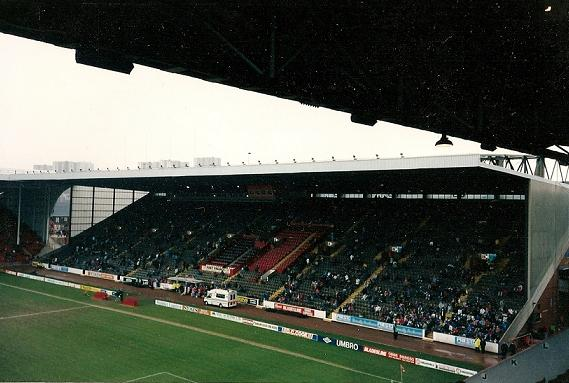
Sheffield United vs Manchester United, on the opening day of the Premiership season in 1992

Dave Bassett took charge on 21 January 1988 shortly before the club's relegation to the Third Division, via a loss in the playoffs against Bristol City. He then masterminded two successive promotions which saw them in the First Division for the 1990–91 season – the first in season 1988–89. Bassett's inspired signings of Tony Agana and Brian Deane were instrumental in getting the Blades finished in 2nd place that year, with the pair weighing in with over 20 goals each.

The following season saw United battle with rivals Leeds United for the top spot all season, with Leeds only becoming Champions on the final day. They were the subject of a BBC2 documentary "United", shown over a 6-week period towards the end of the 1989–90 season, with the fortunes of the club being played out in front of an audience of millions. The BBC got their fairytale ending – United gaining promotion on a glorious day at Leicester, winning 5–2 with goals from Paul Wood, Brian Deane, Wilf Rostron, and 2 from Tony Agana. This season also saw the rise of the chant "Ooh Ah Bob Booker" in adulation of 32-year-old Bob Booker, signed by Bassett from Brentford in 1989 but soon a hero to fans of the club. This would later be borrowed for Eric Cantona, but Booker maintains in the book "Match of My Life – Sheffield United" by Nick Johnson, that the chant was originally started by fans of the club. They reached the quarter-finals of the FA Cup, losing 1–0 at home to eventual winners Manchester United.

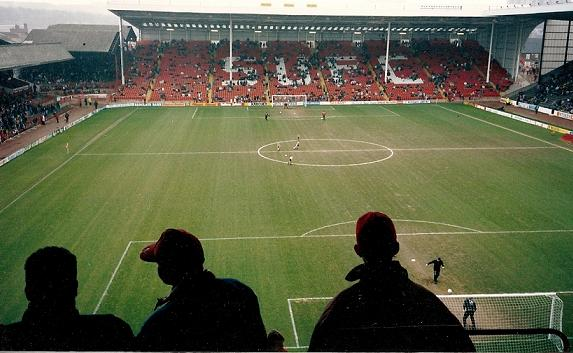
Sheffield United vs Manchester United, on the opening day of the Premiership Season in 1992

From 1990, Sheffield United were in the top division of English football for four seasons – including the first two Premier League campaigns. They failed to win any of their first 17 league games in 1990–91 and seemed set for an immediate return to the Second Division, only to recover dramatically and comfortably achieve survival in 13th place. A slow start followed at the beginning of the 1991–92 season, but Bassett's team recaptured their form and finished an impressive ninth, comfortably qualifying for a place in the new Premier League for the 1992–93 season.

Brian Deane scored the first ever Premiership goal on 15 August 1992, five minutes into the 2–1 home win over Manchester United. Despite spending most of the first half of the season in the relegation zone, they showed the form of a title-winning team in the second half of the season, with only Arsenal matching them for points won in the New year. They also ended Manchester United's double bid with a 2–1 win at Bramall Lane in the FA Cup fifth round, going on to reach the semi-finals, where they lost to local rivals Sheffield Wednesday.

Brian Deane was sold to Leeds United in the summer of 1993, and the Blades were unable to find a suitable replacement. They found it increasingly difficult to score goals in 1993–94, and were relegated on the final day of the season when a last minute goal gave Chelsea a 3–2 win. 1994–95 saw the Blades finish eighth in Division One – not enough for even a playoff place. By December 1995, Bassett had stepped down as manager of a side at the foot of the Division One table, and the club's new board of directors appointed Howard Kendall as the man faced with the task of saving the club from relegation.

== Pushing for promotion (1995–2006) ==
Dave Bassett resigned as manager in November 1995 to be replaced by Howard Kendall, who was at the helm for 18 months before being lured back to Everton for his third spell as manager at the end of the 1996–97 season, just a few weeks after Sheffield United blew the chance of a return to the Premiership by losing 1–0 to Crystal Palace in the Division One Play-Off Final.

Over the next two-and-a-half years, Sheffield United had three unsuccessful managers – Nigel Spackman, Steve Bruce and Adrian Heath – although they reached the FA Cup semi final again in 1998. In December 1999 the club turned to Neil Warnock in a bid to re-establish the club as promotion challengers. At this time the club was over £20m in debt and the priority was cutting costs, so Warnock's first three seasons in charge ended in mid-table finishes in Division One.

2002–03 was a promising season for Sheffield United, when they reached the semi-finals of the FA Cup and League Cup, losing both ties to Premiership clubs, (Arsenal and Liverpool, respectively). They also reached the Division One playoff final, but were beaten 3–0 by Wolverhampton Wanderers at the Millennium Stadium.

In both 2003–04 and 2004–05, Sheffield United narrowly missed out on a place in the playoffs for promotion to the Premier League finishing 8th in both seasons.

2005–06 was the team's twelfth straight season at the second level of the English football pyramid – a period longer than any other team currently in the Championship, and their longest spell in any Division since 1934.

After beating Cardiff 1–0 on Good Friday and never being outside of the top two places all season, United required only one point from their final three games to secure their promotion. Results later that evening meant only Leeds United could in theory catch Sheffield United, but the following day, 15 April 2006, they failed to beat Reading at Elland Road. After many disappointments in the previous few seasons, Sheffield United finally won promotion back into the Premiership.

=== A season of Premiership football ===
Sheffield United finished 18th in the Premiership, and were relegated to the Championship after just one season back in the top flight.

In total, they won ten games during this season, seven at home and three away. Their 2–1 home victory against Middlesbrough on 30 September was their first Premiership victory since April 1994. The first away win of the season came against Newcastle United on 4 November. The remaining victories came against Charlton Athletic (home), Watford (home and away), West Ham United (home), Wigan Athletic (away), Arsenal (home), Fulham (home) and Tottenham Hotspur (home).

They lost just five home games, to Reading, Chelsea, Newcastle United and both Manchester clubs.

United's Premiership top scorer was Rob Hulse with eight goals. Danny Webber, Phil Jagielka and Jon Stead each scored four goals. Keith Gillespie, Stephen Quinn, Christian Nadé scored two goals apiece. Colin Kazım-Richards, Chris Morgan and Michael Tonge each score once.

On 24 October 2006, a second string side was knocked out of the League Cup at the third round stage by Championship side Birmingham City, suffering a 4–2 defeat at Bramall Lane. A similarly understrength team had narrowly beaten Bury of League Two in the previous round. In the FA Cup third round, United lost 3–0 at home to League One side Swansea City.

During the game against Chelsea at Stamford Bridge on 17 March 2007, Hulse suffered a broken leg in a collision with Chelsea's goalkeeper Petr Čech and was ruled out for the rest of the season. This coincided with a poor run of form that saw United slide down the table and into relegation trouble.

On 14 April, after losing three games in succession, United climbed out of the relegation zone by beating fellow relegation battlers West Ham United 3–0 at Bramall Lane. A week later, the club drew 1–1 away to 18th place rivals Charlton Athletic and were well-placed to retain their status.

On 13 May, Sheffield United played Wigan Athletic at home in the last game of the season, needing to avoid defeat to ensure Premiership status. United lost 2–1, meaning both clubs finished on 38 points. By virtue of Wigan's goal difference being one better than United's, they stayed up at the Blades' expense. Even with this result, a defeat for West Ham against Manchester United at Old Trafford would have seen the Blades safe and the Hammers relegated, but West Ham recorded a 1–0 victory to guarantee their survival.

Sheffield United mounted a legal challenge against their relegation on the basis that West Ham should have been docked points over irregularities with the transfers of Carlos Tevez and Javier Mascherano. West Ham were fined £5.5 million instead of having points deducted. However, Sheffield United failed in their appeal and started the 200708 season in the Championship. A claim for compensation against West Ham was finally settled out of court in August 2013, with Sheffield United reportedly receiving £10m payable in instalments over a five-year period.

== Relegations (2007–2016) ==
Neil Warnock resigned shortly after the relegation, ending a near-eight year reign as manager. Bryan Robson was named as his successor, but was sacked on 14 February 2008 following a goalless draw at previous club West Bromwich Albion, with the Blades languishing in the bottom half of the Championship. Having turned down the chance to become Director of Football at Bramall Lane, Robson left the club altogether.

Kevin Blackwell, who had been assistant manager to Warnock in the first four seasons of his reign, was named as Robson's successor until the end of the season. In the final stages of the season a marked improvement in form was achieved and the Blades finished ninth. Indeed, the play-offs were not mathematically out of reach until the end of the last match of the season. He was confirmed as the permanent successor to Robson with two games of the season remaining, signing a 3-year contract. From Blackwell's initial appointment until the end of the season, only Hull City gained more points than the Blades.

On 25 May 2009, Sheffield United came up against Burnley in the Championship Play-Off final. They lost the match 1–0 and were forced to stay in the Championship for at least the following year. Jamie Ward was sent off during the match after receiving two yellow cards and Lee Hendrie received a red card after the match.

The Championship campaign started well for The Blades, drawing 1–1 away at Cardiff on the opening day of the season. However, results since then have not been favourable, recording six losses in the first nine games of the season. Kevin Blackwell was subsequently sacked as manager after two league games, with Gary Speed taking over, before leaving to manage Wales after a matter of months. After a caretaker spell by John Carver, the club subsequently appointed Micky Adams, without an improvement in results, leaving the Blades bottom of the table by early April. On 30 April 2011, Sheffield United were relegated to League One after the results of relegation rivals Doncaster Rovers and Crystal Palace meant that a 2–2 draw at home to Barnsley was of no relevance.

Following relegation, Adams was dismissed as manager and replaced by Danny Wilson, a controversial appointment considering his past spell managing cross-city rivals Wednesday. Ironically, Wednesday would narrowly pip United to automatic promotion that season, as a late run of poor form saw the Blades finish third. They went into the play-offs, but were ultimately defeated by another Yorkshire side, Huddersfield Town. Wilson left late into the 2012–13 season with the club in the play-offs but well off the automatic promotion race. Chris Morgan was appointed as temporary manager for the remainder of the season, and a fifth-place finish saw them enter the play-offs again, where despite a 1–0 win at Bramall Lane in the first leg they were ultimately eliminated by eventual play-off winners Yeovil Town.

David Weir was appointed as the club's new manager over the summer and heavily backed with funds by the board, but despite a promising opening-day win over Notts County, a disastrous run of form saw the Blades bottom of the table by the end of September, leading to Weir being dismissed and eventually replaced by Nigel Clough. The rest of the 2013–14 season was a considerable improvement, as the club finished seventh and were only kept out of the play-offs by their dismal early-season form, though the real story was a run to the semi-finals of the FA Cup, where they were ultimately eliminated 5–3 by Hull City. 2014–15 would be a similar story, with strong cup runs, including to the fourth round of the FA Cup and the semi-finals of the League Cup, and a fifth-place finish in League One. However, a 7–6 aggregate elimination by Swindon Town saw Clough dismissed as manager, with the board feeling he had taken the club as far as he could. Nigel Adkins succeeded him as manager, but the 2015–16 season saw the Blades struggle for league form, never seriously challenging for promotion at any point in the campaign and ultimately finishing eleventh, their lowest league finish since 1983, which saw Adkins' term as manager cut short after just a year.

== Promotions (2016–present) ==
Former player Chris Wilder was appointed as manager over the summer, and despite a four-game winless run at the start of the season, finally managed to turn things around for the Blades. The club broke into the top two in mid-November and never left the automatic promotion places, eventually securing a return to the Championship on 8 April 2017. On 15 April they secured the League One title when Bolton Wanderers, their closest challenger, lost 1–0 at Oldham Athletic, the Blades becoming the fourth club to win all four tiers of professional English football after Wolverhampton Wanderers in 1988, Burnley in 1992, and Preston North End in 1996, all of them having won the fourth-tier title. Sheffield United was also the first of these clubs to not be among the founding members of the original English Football League. The Blades finished the season with a club record 100 points after defeating Chesterfield 3–2 on the final day of the season.

=== Two returns to the Premier League ===
In September 2013, Abdullah bin Musaid Al Saud of the House of Saud had bought a 50 per cent stake in United's parent company "Blades Leisure Ltd". Both parties, at that time, agreed to include a "roulette notice" mechanism to end their arrangement when they no longer wished to work together. In late 2017, co-owner Kevin McCabe served a roulette notice on Prince Abdullah, giving him the option to sell his 50 per cent at £5 million or buy McCabe's 50 per cent for the same price. Prince Abdullah chose to buy but McCabe refused to sell, a decision that ended up before the High Court of Justice.

In the 2018–19 season, Sheffield United achieved automatic promotion to the Premier League. United's first season back in the Premier League, despite being tipped by many for relegation, produced a ninth-place finish. Despite this, ownership disputes between Prince Abdullah and McCabe continued. In September 2019, after 20 months of litigation, the High Court issued its judgment, requiring McCabe's company to sell its shares in United. McCabe sought permission to appeal from the High Court and Court of Appeal but both appeals were rejected. As a result, Prince Abdullah became the sole beneficial owner of the club. In the 2020–21 season, the club made a very poor start to the season, taking just one win in their opening eighteen matches. Wilder left the club by mutual consent in March 2021. He was replaced by Paul Heckingbottom as caretaker manager, who could not prevent relegation at the end of the season. In May 2021, the club appointed Slaviša Jokanović as the new manager, making him the first overseas manager the club's history. However, Jokanović was dismissed in November 2021 after a poor start to the season and Heckingbottom was reappointed as manager, this time on a permanent basis. Heckingbottom appointed former Sheffield United players Stuart McCall and Jack Lester as part of his coaching team. The 2021–22 season resulted in a fifth place finish in the Championship, losing in the play-off semi-finals to Nottingham Forest on penalties. During the following season, Nigerian businessman Dozy Mmobuosi failed with an attempted £90 million takeover of the financially troubled club having reportedly paying a near-£10 million non-refundable deposit. By the end of the season, Heckingbottom had guided United back to the Premier League, securing automatic promotion with a second place finish. The team also reached the F.A. Cup Semi-final, losing 3–0 to Manchester City at Wembley Stadium.

Sheffield United's return to the Premier League for the 2023–24 season proved to be difficult and by early December they sat at the bottom of the league. The club's board decided to dismiss Heckingbottom, replacing him with former Blades manager Chris Wilder. Despite the managerial change, the team's poor form continued and their relegation back to the Championship was confirmed on 27 April 2024 following a 5–1 loss to Newcastle United. On 11 May 2024, after conceding the 101st goal of their campaign in a 1–0 defeat to Everton, Sheffield United set a new record for the most goals conceded in a single Premier League season, breaking Swindon Town's record of 100 from the 1993–94 season. On the final matchday of the season, the club lost 3–0 to Tottenham Hotspur at home, finalising their new record of 104 goals conceded, in addition to a goal difference of −69, matching Derby County's record from the 2007–08 season. Furthermore, they set new records for goals conceded at home with 57, surpassing Aston Villa's record from the 1935–36 season, and recorded a home goal difference of −38.

=== Championship years (2024-present) ===
In December 2024, an American consortium, COH Sports, led by businessmen Steven Rosen and Helmy Eltoukhy, completed a takeover, ending Prince Abdullah's five-year ownership of the club. In the 2024–25 season, the Blades finished third in the EFL Championship, narrowly failing to win automatic promotion, and lost to Sunderland in the playoff final in extra time. Wilder's contact was terminated in June 2025. Wilder was reappointed on a two-year contract on 15 September 2025, following the dismissal of Rubén Sellés after a poor start to the season, and the Blades finished the 2025–26 Championship season in 13th place. In July 2026, Prince Abdullah claimed he was owed £35m by COH Sports and issued a winding-up petition against the consortium.

== Chairmen of Sheffield United F.C. ==
- Michael Ellison (1889-96)
- Charles Stokes (1896-1913)
- Tom Bott (1913-20)
- Joseph Smith (1920)
- Walter Sissons (1921-30)
- Alfred Cattell (1930-33)
- Albert Platt (1933-49)
- George Marlow (1949-53)
- Frank Copestake (1953-55)
- E. Senior Atkin (1955-57)
- Harold Blacow Yates (1957-61)
- Dick Wragg (1961-76)
- John Hassall (1976-81)
- Reg Brealey (1981-91)
- Paul Woolhouse (1991-92)
- Alan Laver (1992-93)
- Reg Brealey (1993-96)
- Mike McDonald (1996-98)
- Kevin McCabe (1998-99)
- Derek Dooley (1999-2006)
- Terry Robinson (2006-08)
- Kevin McCabe (2008-10)
- Chris Steer (2010-12)
- Dave Green (2012-13)
- Kevin McCabe and Abdullah bin Musa'ad Al Saud (2013-14)
- Kevin McCabe and Jim Phipps (2014-16)
- Kevin McCabe (2016-19)
- Musa’ad bin Khalid Al Saud (2019-21)
- Yusuf Giansiracusa (2021-24)
- Steven Rosen and Helmy Eltoukhy (2024-present)
