= Guardant Health =

American biotechnology company

Guardant Health, Inc.
- Type: Public
- Traded as: Nasdaq: GH
- Industry: Biotechnology
- Founded: 2012; 14 years ago
- Founders: Helmy Eltoukhy; AmirAli Talasaz
- Headquarters: Palo Alto, California, United States
- Key people: Helmy Eltoukhy (co-CEO); AmirAli Talasaz (co-CEO)
- Revenue: ▲US$982 million (2025)
- Net income: ▲ −US$416 million (2025)
- Number of employees: 1,400 (2022)
- Website: guardanthealth.com

Guardant Health, Inc. is an American biotechnology company based in Palo Alto, California. Co-founders Helmy Eltoukhy and AmirAli Talasaz serve as co-chief executive officers.

== History ==
The American biotechnology company Guardant Health, which produces liquid biopsy tests to detect cancer from mutations and other modifications in blood samples, was co-founded by Helmy Eltoukhy and AmirAli Talasaz during 2012–2013. According to John Dorfman of the Pittsburgh Tribune-Review, Talasaz and Eltoukhy discovered a technique which "involves detecting and monitoring tumor fragments circulating in the patient's bloodstream", as an alternative to traditional tissue biopsies. The duo met at Stanford University in 2002 and worked together at Illumina, until Talasaz left in 2012.

Early in its history, Guardant Health acquired multiple patents by Swiss biochemist Maurice Stroun, who became a founding advisor. In 2015, the company had 40 patents and was developing a blood test to "identify all classes of actionable tumor genomic alterations", according to VentureBeat. Guardant Health said the test would be the "first and only comprehensive biopsy-free cancer test available". In 2016, the company announced clinical trial results demonstrating the test "detected disease-associated genetic mutations that were also present in 94% to 100% of the solid tissues extracted from the study's subjects".

The company's U.S. initial public offering in 2018 raised $237.5 million, valuing Guardant Health at $3.3 billion. In December 2022, Guardant Health announced the results of a study on its blood-based screening test for colorectal cancers, which it began in 2019. The study included 20,000 participants identified as having an average risk for colorectal cancer. Results showed the test was 83 percent accurate at detecting the presence of cancer, with a 10 percent false positivity rate. Bloomberg reported that the results were short of the 85 percent accuracy rate that investors expected, and the company's stock price fell following the news. A competitor's stool-based test for the same cancer is 92 percent accurate.

=== Funding ===
Guardant Health raised approximately $550 million in funding in its first six years. Aydin Senkut was an early investor. The company raised $30 million in 2014, including $10 million from Sequoia Capital. In 2015, Guardant Health raised $50 million in a venture round led by Lightspeed Venture Partners. The funding was used for infrastructure and growing operations. Guardant Health's Series D round in January 2017 raised approximately $100 million, bringing total funding to $190 million.

In 2017, the company raised $360 million in a round led by a subsidiary of SoftBank Group. The funding supports an attempt to sequence the DNA of 1 million cancer patients in five years, bring to market a blood test to screen for early signs of cancer, and a blood test to detect residual disease in cancer survivors. Guardant Health and SoftBank formed the joint venture to expand the use of Guardant360 in Africa, Asia, and the Middle East. The joint venture, called Guardant Health AMEA, launched in 2018 and was purchased by Guardant Health for approximately $178 million in 2022.

== Corporate affairs ==
=== Business model and operations ===
Guardant Health earns revenue from test fees purchased by third-party insurance companies and drug developers. The company generated $374 million in revenue in 2021. Guardant Health has approximately 1,400 employees, including approximately 900 in California, as of 2022.

In July 2020, Guardant Health signed a lease for two levels at the former Hewlett Packard Enterprise headquarters in Palo Alto. The lease agreement was the largest in Silicon Valley for the year to date, and the company has since moved its corporate headquarters to the approximately 250,000-square-foot Palo Alto space. The offices in Torrey Pines, San Diego are Guardant Health's largest outside Palo Alto and Redwood City at 37,000 square feet. The company has labs and 55 employees in San Diego as of 2022.

=== Leadership ===
Talasaz has served on Guardant Health's board of directors since January 2013, occupying the chairman role until August 2021. He was the company's president and chief technology officer, as of 2014. He held the president, chief financial officer, and chief operating officer positions in 2019, when he and Eltoukhy collectively held 12 percent of the company's stock. In 2021, both spent $10 million to purchase additional shares of the company.

Talasaz and Eltoukhy are co-chief executive officers as of 2022. Richard B. Lanman joined in 2014 as the chief medical officer (CMO). Craig Eagle was named CMO in 2021.

== Products ==
Guardant Health has partnered with the National Cancer Institute and large pharmaceutical companies on product improvement. The business began selling Guardant360 tests to oncologists in 2014. Medicare began covering the test for select lung cancer patients in 2018, prior to Food and Drug Administration approval (which is not required) in 2020. By 2019, the Guardant360 genomic test, which requires two blood samples and examines 73 genes, had been used for 50 types of cancer by 6,000 oncologists to assess samples from 100,000 patients. The test had also been used by 50 biopharmaceutical companies for drug development purposes. In late 2019, the Guardant360 test received expanded Medicare coverage for solid tumors.

Guardant Health launched Project Lunar, which studied hundreds of "pre-symptomatic, high-risk" people for breast, colorectal, lung, ovarian, and pancreatic cancer, in May 2016 in collaboration with the University of California, San Francisco, the Seoul-based Samsung Medical Center, the University of Colorado, and the University of Pennsylvania. The GuardantOMNI test launched in 2017 and has been used for biopharmaceutical research. Guardant Health launched the early-stage cancer assay called Lunar for academic and biopharmaceutical research in 2019.

Japan's Ministry of Health, Labour and Welfare granted regulatory approval of Guardant360 CDx as a companion diagnostic "for identifying patients with metastatic non-small cell lung cancer who may benefit from treatment with Lumakras (sotorasib)" in late 2021. The agency granted regulatory approval of the test in 2022 for patients with "advanced solid tumors" and as a companion diagnostic "to identify patients with microsatellite instability-high (MSI-High) solid tumors who may benefit from Keytruda (pembrolizumab) and patients with MSI-High advanced colorectal cancer who may benefit from Opdivo (nivolumab)".

In 2021, Guardant Health introduced Guardant Reveal, the first blood-only liquid biopsy test for the detection of residual and recurrent disease in colorectal cancer (CRC). The test helps oncologists improve the management of early-stage CRC patients by detecting circulating tumor DNA (ctDNA) in blood after surgery to identify patients with residual disease who may benefit most from adjuvant therapy, and by detecting recurrence earlier than current standard-of-care methods like carcinoembryonic antigen (CEA) tests or imaging.

In 2022, Guardant Health enrolled the first patient in the Screening for High-Frequency Malignant Disease (SHIELD) Lung study to evaluate its blood-based screening technology for lung cancer. Guardant Health also launched a colon cancer detection test called Shield. The company partnered with the Vall d'Hebron Institute of Oncology to launch the first blood-based cancer testing services in Barcelona in mid 2022. Guardant Health also licensed cancer tests to the clinical laboratory company Adicon for research testing in China. In 2024 Guardant's Shield, colon cancer test received FDA approval. In May 2025, coverage by TIME magazine reported that the test was covered by Medicare and has had 6,400 tests administered since its approval in July of 2024. On May 27, 2026, the American Cancer Society included it as an option for colon cancer screenings.

== Litigation ==
Guardant Health sued Foundation Medicine over patents in 2019–2020. In 2021, Guardant Health licensed intellectual property to Foundation Medicine for $25 million in a settlement. In 2022, Illumina sued Guardant Health and its co-founders in Delaware federal court over trade secrets. Illumina accused the duo of incorporating Guardant Health anonymously in 2011 while working at Illumina and stealing confidential documents related to DNA sequencing technology to acquire 35 patents. In response, Guardant Health rejected the claims, accused Illumina of attempting to eliminate competitors, and asked for a suit dismissal. In 2023, the two companies settled, signed a long-term supply agreement, and agreed to share specimen samples for cancer research.

== Giving ==
As of Feb. 11th, 2026, Guardant was the leading donor, to James Van Der Beek's Family Go Fund Me to the amount of $25,000, following his death from Colorectal Cancer.
