= AmirAli Talasaz =

American CEO

- Born: August 3, 1979
- Education: Doctor of Philosophy
- Alma mater: Stanford University
- Occupation: Entrepreneur, chief executive officer, electrical engineer, researcher, chair
- Employer: Guardant Health; Illumina (2009–2012)

AmirAli Talasaz is an entrepreneur in the field of clinical diagnostics. He founded the startup Auriphex Biosciences and is co-founder and co-chief executive officer of Guardant Health.

== Education ==
Talasaz studied electrical engineering at Sharif University in Tehran and later attended Stanford University from 2001 to 2007, where he earned a Doctor of Philosophy degree. Prior to attending Stanford, he was introduced to Ronald W. Davis of the university's Genome Technology Center by Mostafa Ronaghi, who later became chief technology officer at Illumina, Inc.

== Career ==
Talasaz is an electrical engineer and researcher. Leena Rao of TechCrunch has described him as a "serial" entrepreneur in the fields of clinical research and sample preparation. Talasaz worked at the Genome Technology Center until 2009, when he founded Auriphex Biosciences, which developed methods for isolating cancer cells from blood. He also worked for Illumina from March 2009 to June 2012.

In 2012-2013, Talasaz and Helmy Eltoukhy co-founded Guardant Health, which developed liquid biopsy technology to detect and analyze cancer DNA with a simple blood test rather than a tissue biopsy, The duo met at Stanford in 2002 and worked together at Illumina, until Talasaz left in 2012. According to John Dorfman of the Pittsburgh Tribune-Review, Talasaz and Eltoukhy discovered a liquid biopsy technique which "involves detecting and monitoring tumor fragments circulating in the patient's bloodstream", as an alternative to traditional tissue biopsies. Talasaz was first the president and chief technology officer of Guardant Health. He held the president, chief financial officer, and chief operating officer positions in 2019, when he and Eltoukhy collectively held 12 percent of Guardant Health's stock. In 2021, both spent $10 million to purchase additional shares of the company. Talasaz and Eltoukhy are now co-chief executive officers.

In 2020, the Guardant360 CDx became the first FDA-approved liquid biopsy for comprehensive genomic profiling (CGP) across all solid tumors and as a companion diagnostic to detect EGFR mutations in non-small cell lung cancer. By 2026, the Guardant360 CDX liquid biopsy had FDA approval for 25 different companion diagnostic applications.

In 2022, Illumina sued Guardant Health and its co-founders in Delaware federal court over trade secrets. Illumina accused the duo of incorporating Guardant Health anonymously in 2011, while working at Illumina and stealing confidential documents related to DNA sequencing technology to acquire 35 patents. In response, Guardant Health rejected the claims, accused Illumina of attempting to eliminate competitors, and asked for a suit dismissal. In 2023, the two companies settled, signed a long-term supply agreement, and agreed to share specimen samples for cancer research.

Guardant Health's SHIELD blood test was approved by the FDA in 2024, the first liquid biopsy approved as a primary early detection option for colorectal cancer. The blood test can be ordered by doctors as an alternative to more invasive screening tests like colonoscopies or stool-based tests for average-risk adults aged 45 and older. Dr. Talasaz leads the early cancer detection division of Guardant Health.

=== Board service and recognition ===
Talasaz has served on Guardant Health's board of directors since January 2013, occupying the chairman role until August 2021. He also serves on the board of uLab Systems, and is a founding member of the World Innovations Network.

In 2017, Talasaz and Eltoukhy ranked number 37 in Fortune magazine's "40 Under 40" list. The duo were also included in Time magazine's 2018 "Health Care 50" list, which recognizes people for transforming health care.

== See also ==
- List of Stanford University people
