= Kevin McCabe (businessman) =

British businessman

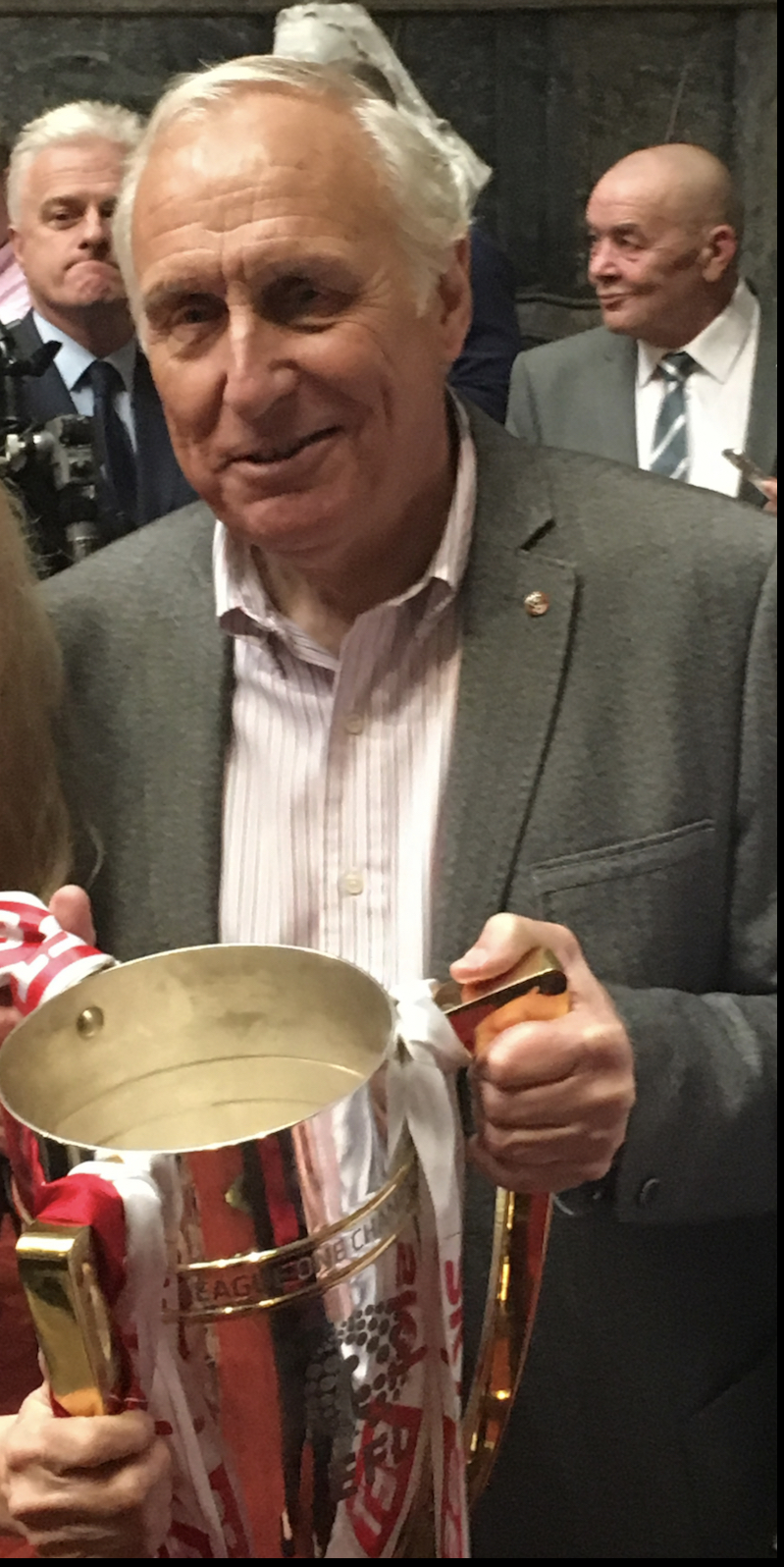
- McCabe with the Sky Bet League One Trophy in 2017
- Born: Kevin Charles McCabe; 25 April 1948 (age 78); Sheffield, West Riding of Yorkshire, England
- Occupations: Former owner of Sheffield United F.C.; President of Scarborough Group International; Businessman
- Known for: English property businessman and former owner and chairman of Sheffield United F.C.

Owner of Sheffield United
- In office 1998–2019

19th, 22nd and 25th Chairman of Sheffield United
- In office 1998–1999
- Preceded by: Mike McDonald
- Succeeded by: Derek Dooley
- In office 2008–2010
- Preceded by: Terry Robinson
- Succeeded by: Chris Steer
- In office 2013–2019
- Preceded by: David Green
- Succeeded by: Musa’ad bin Khalid Al Saud

Owner of Chengdu Blades
- In office 2006–2010

Owner of Ferencvarosi TC
- In office 2008–2011

Co-owner of Central Coast Mariners
- In office 2008–2011

Kevin Charles McCabe (born 25 April 1948) is a British property developer and businessman from Sheffield, England. He is the founder and president of Scarborough Group International, a property investment and development company with operations across the United Kingdom, Europe, and Asia. Through his business career, McCabe has been involved in large-scale commercial and mixed-use developments, contributing to urban regeneration projects in several cities.

McCabe is also known for his long-standing involvement in professional football. He served as owner and chairman of Sheffield United F.C. from 1998 to 2019, a period during which the club experienced promotion to the Premier League, significant redevelopment of Bramall Lane stadium, and expansion into international markets. This included football-related investments and partnerships in countries such as China, Hungary, and Australia.

In addition to his business and football interests, McCabe is also an author. In 2024, he published his memoir, Mucky Boots: Triumphs, Trials and Tragedies of a Football Club Owner, which recounts his experiences in property development and football club ownership.

McCabe has received several honours in recognition of his contributions to business and the Yorkshire region. These include an international fellowship award in 2010, an honorary doctorate from the University of Sheffield, and the Business Enterprise Award at the Yorkshire Awards in 2025.

== Career ==
Kevin McCabe is a British businessman and property developer, best known as the founder of Scarborough Group International, a property investment and development company with operations in the United Kingdom and overseas.

McCabe began his career working in the construction industry before moving into property development. He went on to establish Scarborough Group, which developed a portfolio of commercial and residential projects across the UK and internationally, including ventures in Europe, the Middle East, and Asia.

In addition to his property interests, McCabe is widely known for his involvement in professional football. He became chairman of Sheffield United F.C. in 1998 and later owner, overseeing the club’s operations for more than two decades.

During his tenure, the club experienced promotion to the Premier League and invested in infrastructure including stadium development and youth facilities. McCabe also pursued international expansion of the Sheffield United brand, establishing affiliated clubs and partnerships abroad, particularly in China.

His ownership period also included a number of high-profile disputes and challenges, including the fallout from the Carlos Tevez affair and a legal dispute with co-owner Prince Abdullah bin Mosaad bin Abdulaziz Al Saud. In 2019, a High Court ruling resulted in McCabe losing control of the club.

Alongside his business and football activities, McCabe has been involved in a range of regeneration and investment projects, particularly in Sheffield, contributing to the city’s economic development.

== Scarborough Group ==
McCabe began his career in the construction industry as a quantity surveyor in Sheffield before moving to Scotland in the early 1970s to work for Teesland Development Company. He later established his own property businesses during the 1970s, which formed the foundation of the Scarborough Group.

In June 2007, McCabe sold his entire 60 per cent stake in Scamp Holdings Ltd, a subsidiary of Scarborough Group that owned a real estate investment management operation, together with a significant portfolio of real estate across Europe, to the Australian company, Valad. Following the deal McCabe retained a position on the board until his resignation in October 2009 after receiving the final $56.5 million payment for the European property assets.

In 2024, Scarborough Group International revived a management services platform inspired by McCabe’s earlier Teesland business, offering third party development management services.

Later that year, McCabe was shortlisted for the Lifetime Achievement Award at the UK Family Business Awards.

== Sheffield United ==
McCabe served as chairman and owner of Sheffield United from 1999 and remained involved with the club for around two decades. In 2019, following a dispute with co-owner Abdullah bin Mosaad Al Saud, the High Court ruled that McCabe was required to sell his 50% stake in the club for £5 million under a contractual “Russian roulette” clause.

A subsequent negligence claim brought by McCabe’s companies against the law firm Shepherd and Wedderburn over the drafting of the agreement was dismissed in 2023, although the court found the firm had been negligent in several respects.

In 2024, McCabe published a memoir about his time running Sheffield United F.C. titled Mucky Boots: Trials and Tragedies of a Football Club Owner, written with Peter Beeby.

A supporter of Sheffield United, McCabe formed a £50 million joint venture between Sheffield United and Scarborough Holdings to invest in low-risk commercial property. United Scarborough, a £50 million property joint-venture with his Scarborough property vehicle, sold two properties for a £1.6 million profit, £800,000 of which expanded the 2006–07 profit/loss margin.

Sheffield United acquired a 90% controlling stake in Chengdu Football Club in January 2006, and changed the name of the club to Chengdu Blades Football Club. Then in November 2010 it was reported by various media sources that the club was to sell the majority of its stake in Chengdu Blades as Sheffield United announced losses of nearly £19 million.

=== Carlos Tevez and West Ham United ===
In May 2007, McCabe launched a legal fight against an independent commission's decision not to punish West Ham United F.C. with a points deduction after the signing of Carlos Tevez and Javier Mascherano. which was believed to be breaching rules governing the ownership of football players. Sheffield United were relegated from English football Premier League on the final day of 2006–07 season. McCabe said that Sheffield United would turn to the European Commission for compensation if an independent arbitration panel failed to overturn their relegation from the Premiership.

A statement made by the committee on 17 June explained that "Sheffield United are asking the arbitral panel to determine two matters. The first, is whether the decision by the independent disciplinary commission on 27 April to fine West Ham, rather than dock points, was legally flawed such as to require the issue to be determined afresh by a disciplinary commission at some point in the future. The second is whether the Premier League acted unlawfully by not de-registering Tevez. Fulham are seeking similar relief. The arbitral panel have no power to decide what the penalty to be imposed upon West Ham should be. This will be within the exclusive remit of the disciplinary commission, if one is convened as a result of the arbitral panel's decision."

A two-day arbitration tribunal was held on 18 June 2007 to examine the decision by an independent committee set up by the Premier League not to dock West Ham United league points for breaching rules governing the ownership of football players.

McCabe and Sheffield United subsequently lost their arbitration appeal after the tribunal found in favour of the FA Premier League on both issues and dismissed the claims of Sheffield United. The three-man panel did not have the power to change West Ham's punishment but could have ordered a new independent commission to judge the case. The tribunal said they had "sympathy" with "the Blades", while West Ham had been "deliberately deceitful" and yet remained in the Premier League.

As a result of the hearing, McCabe announced that Sheffield United would be "going to the High Court to appeal". McCabe accepted that Sheffield United will not be reinstated to the Premier League, but would be looking for up to £50 million in compensation.

On 13 July 2007, Sheffield United lost its High Court appeal against the Premier League. An arbitration panel upheld the original decision not to dock West Ham points over the transfers of Tevez and Mascherano. The Blades went into the High Court hearing seeking to prove that the arbitration panel made an "error in law" by not ordering a new disciplinary commission to deal with the affair – but the High Court rejected the argument. McCabe continued to insist the club is due compensation, and indicated "other avenues that I think may be worth pursuing" after the High Court ruling.

Sheffield United initiated legal proceedings against West Ham United on 16 August 2007, for substantial compensation after the club was relegated from the Premier League in 2006–07 season. United have estimated the cost of their relegation at between £30 million and £50 million. The Blades subsequently failed in this High Court bid to force the Premier League to take disciplinary action against West Ham, and claim West Ham failed to disclose vital information at the hearing. However, West Ham deny Sheffield United's claims.

On 7 November 2007 McCabe confirmed that Sheffield United's case for compensation following their relegation from the Premier League would be heard by a Football Association tribunal in mid-2008. Having failed in their attempt to have the original punishment overturned, United will seek monetary recognition and a financial settlement. On 23 September 2008, McCabe revealed that the independent tribunal had finally ruled in his club's favour, finding that West Ham United F.C. did breach a duty to Sheffield United and should pay damages in an amount sufficient to compensate Sheffield United for the losses it suffered as a result of that breach of duty It was also revealed that the tribunal will decide on the amount of compensation to be paid at a later sitting.

In a statement on their club website West Ham United said that they would take legal advice before deciding whether to appeal the decision. On 15 October 2008, West Ham United filed an appeal with the Court of Arbitration for Sport. Subsequently, Sheffield United filed a response which denied the jurisdiction of the Court of Arbitration for Sport. The FA supported Sheffield United's position in a letter to the Court of Arbitration for Sport which stated that 'The FA's position is that any award made by an arbitration tribunal convened under FA Rules is final and binding on the parties. FA Rules do not provide for right of appeal to CAS'. On 10 November 2008, a hearing took place in the High Court in which Sheffield United were successful in their application for a temporary injunction to prevent West Ham United's appeal to the Court of Arbitration for Sport.

It was announced on 8 January 2009 that the FA and Premier League would launch a new inquiry into the conduct of West Ham United over the Carlos Tevez affair, in light of the findings of the independent tribunal which found that West Ham United were in further breach of Premier League rules after the independent disciplinary commission's decision of 27 April 2007 On 16 March 2009 Sheffield United and West Ham United announced that they had reached an out-of-court settlement. It has been reported that West Ham have agreed to pay between £15–£25 million although the actual figures have not been made public.

In a joint statement, Scott Duxbury, the West Ham chief executive and Kevin McCabe said: "Both clubs are pleased to announce that a satisfactory settlement for compensation has been reached which brings the dispute between Sheffield United and West Ham United to an end. The tribunal will not be resuming."

=== Saudi investment ===
On 30 August 2013 McCabe announced that Sheffield United had reached a deal with a foreign investor who will become equal owners of the club and will provide new funds. On 3 September it was confirmed that Saudi Prince Abdullah bin Mosaad Al Saud of the royal House of Saud and whose brother was a former President of Al-Hilal FC had bought a 50% stake in United's parent company 'Blades Leisure Ltd' for the fee of £1 with the promise of providing "substantial new capital" with the aim of returning the Blades to the Premier League as "quickly as possible".

In late 2017, McCabe served a roulette notice on Prince Abdullah, giving him the option to sell his 50 per cent at £5 million or buy McCabe's 50 per cent for the same price. Prince Abdullah chose to buy but McCabe refused to sell, a decision that ended up before the High Court of Justice, Business and Property Courts of England and Wales. In September 2019, after 20 months of litigation, the High Court issued its judgment, requiring McCabe's company to sell its shares in Blades. McCabe sought permission to appeal from the High Court and Court of Appeal but both appeals were rejected. As a result, Prince Abdullah became the sole beneficial owner of the club.

== Football ownership and involvement oversees ==
=== Chengdu Blades ===
In 2006 Chendu Taihe were bought by Kevin McCabe, McCabe renamed the club Chengdu Blades and changed their logo to be modelled on Sheffield United's own logo to two crossed steel swords and changed the kit to red and white stripes to reflect Sheffield United. Furthermore, the club's reserve team were also sent to Hong Kong and renamed "Sheffield United (Hong Kong)".

=== Ferencvárosi TC ===
On 14 February 2008 Kevin McCabe the chairman of Sheffield United Public limited company acquired a tender to purchase Hungarian football club Ferencvárosi TC. Ferencváros' real estate was bought for £8.45 million by McCabe's Hungarian company Esplanade Limited liability company with a view to start paying off the £5 million debt. Ferencváros Torna Club officially agreed to sell the football club, Ferencváros Labdarúgó ZRt. to Esplanade Kft., McCabe's company in Hungary in April 2008. McCabe relinquished his ownership of the club in 2011.

=== Central Coast Mariners ===
In 2009 Kevin McCabe invested $1 million into A-League club Central Coast Mariners and soon after joined the board of the club. Kevin McCabe helped the Mariners to develop a new academy as a way of bringng in youth talent. McCabe wanted to use Central Coast Mariners as a way of bringing Australian talent to Sheffield United, one player who did arrive at Bramall Lane from Australia as a result of McCabe's links was David Carney who was signed from Sydney FC, Carney showed potential under Bryan Robson however failed to get game time with Robson's replacement Kevin Blackwell. Sheffield United also used their links with Australia as a way of loaning out their own youth players from Sheffield to help them develop, United would also sell the Mariners players with the most notable being Nick Montgomery who went on to play for the Mariners 113 times in the A-league and also both captain and manage the club.

== Publications ==
=== Mucky Boots ===
Mucky Boots: Triumphs, Trials and Tragedies of a Football Club Owner is a 2024 memoir by Kevin McCabe with Peter Beeby, published by Pitch Publishing.

The book provides a detailed account of McCabe’s two decades as owner and chairman of Sheffield United F.C. It recounts his upbringing near Bramall Lane, his early career in property development, and his decision to take over the club.

According to publisher descriptions, Mucky Boots is a “warts-and-all” narrative of football club ownership, covering key events such as McCabe’s disputes with co-owner Prince Abdullah, the appointment of manager Chris Wilder, and the club’s promotion to the Premier League. The book also traces McCabe’s broader personal and professional journey, beginning with his early life working on building sites and later building a global property business before his involvement in football.

Mucky Boots was released in hardback on 2 September 2024 by Pitch Publishing.

== Honours and recognition ==
McCabe received an international fellowship award in 2010 in recognition of his contribution to business and sporting links between the United Kingdom and China.

He was awarded an honorary doctorate by the University of Sheffield in recognition of his contributions to business and the city.

In 2024, he was shortlisted for a Lifetime Achievement Award at the UK Family Business Awards.

In 2025, McCabe was awarded the Business Enterprise Award at the Yorkshire Awards, presented by The Yorkshire Society, recognising his contributions to the Yorkshire economy and business community.
