= Wealthminder =

Wealthminder is a software company founded by CEO Rich Ellinger.

== History ==
Wealthminder was founded in 2012 by Saba co-founder Rich Ellinger and is headquartered in McLean, VA.

Initially started as a tool to help self-directed individual investors create a financial plan and get investment advice, Wealthminder pivoted in 2015 to providing tools and services to help individual investors and financial advisors find each other.

Wealthminder's board included angel investor and serial entrepreneur Bobby Yazdani.

Its advisory board included financial planner, author and founder of the Garrett Planning Network, Sheryl Garrett, as well as president of Impact Communications Marie Swift.

On February 15, 2017, Wealthminder was acquired by AdvisorEngine.

As of November 2024, Wealthminder has been decommissioned.

== Services ==
=== Practice Management Software ===
Wealthminder's financial planning and practice management software enabled clients to enter data about their goals, existing assets, future savings and willingness to accept risk. It then helped financial advisors create a financial plan and set of recommendations / advice for their client. Clients had online access to their plan and both parties could monitor process against the plan.

=== Advisor Marketplace ===
Wealthminder also provided a directory of information about financial advisors on its site to enable consumers to research and compare financial advisors. In addition, it allowed consumers to request proposals from the fee-only fiduciary advisors that participate in its network.

== Investment and Finances ==
Wealthminder raised a $1.45M seed round in May 2015. Notable investors included venture capital firms Signatures Capital and Geenvisor Capital.
