= 2020–21 Sheffield United F.C. season =

Sheffield United
2020–21 season
- Chairman: Musa’ad bin Khalid Al Saud
- Manager: Chris Wilder (until 13 March); Paul Heckingbottom (interim, from 13 March)
- Stadium: Bramall Lane
- Premier League: 20th (relegated)
- FA Cup: Quarter-finals
- EFL Cup: Second round
- Top goalscorer: League: David McGoldrick (8); All: David McGoldrick (9)
Home colours	Away colours	Third colours

The 2020–21 Sheffield United Football Club season was the club's 132nd season in existence and the club's 2nd consecutive season in the top flight of English football. In addition to the domestic league, Sheffield United participated in this season's editions of the FA Cup and the EFL Cup.

Sheffield United suffered a disastrous start to the season. With just 2 points in their first 17 fixtures, Sheffield United set a record for the worst-ever Premier League start not including administrative point deductions. They also broke the Premier League record of most consecutive games without a win to start the season, with 17. Previously, the record was held by the 2012–13 Queens Park Rangers squad.

Things marginally improved after Matchday 18, when Sheffield United defeated Newcastle United 1–0 on 12 January 2021 at Bramall Lane. Two further wins followed, including a shock away win against Manchester United. However, Sheffield United remained bottom of the table and they were eventually officially relegated on 17 April 2021 following a 1–0 away defeat at Wolves - thus ending the Blades' two-year status in the English top flight. The team manager Chris Wilder resigned towards the end of the season, following reported clashes with the club ownership and board. He was replaced by interim manager Paul Heckingbottom (previously under 23's manager).

== Kits ==
Home	Home alt.1	Home alt.2	Away	Away alt.1	Third	Third alt.1	Third alt.3

== Squad ==
=== Appearances and goals ===
Updated 23 May 2021

No.	Pos	Nat	Player	Total		Premier League		FA Cup		League Cup	
No.	Pos	Nat	Player	Apps	Goals	Apps	Goals	Apps	Goals	Apps	Goals
Goalkeepers
1	GK	(England) ENG	Aaron Ramsdale	42	0	38	0	4	0	0	0
18	GK	(England) ENG	Wes Foderingham	1	0	0	0	0	0	1	0
25	GK	(England) ENG	Simon Moore	0	0	0	0	0	0	0	0
Defenders
2	DF	(England) ENG	George Baldock	34	0	32	0	1+1	0	0	0
3	DF	(Republic of Ireland) IRL	Enda Stevens	32	0	30	0	2	0	0	0
5	DF	(England) ENG	Jack O'Connell	2	0	2	0	0	0	0	0
6	DF	(England) ENG	Chris Basham	35	1	31	0	3	1	0+1	0
12	DF	(Republic of Ireland) IRL	John Egan	34	0	30+1	0	3	0	0	0
13	DF	(England) ENG	Max Lowe	11	0	6+2	0	1+1	0	1	0
15	DF	(England) ENG	Phil Jagielka	12	0	6+4	0	1	0	1	0
19	DF	(England) ENG	Jack Robinson	12	0	10+1	0	0	0	1	0
20	DF	(England) ENG	Jayden Bogle	21	3	12+4	2	4	1	1	0
22	DF	(Wales) WAL	Ethan Ampadu	29	0	23+2	0	3	0	1	0
29	DF	(England) ENG	Kean Bryan	15	1	12+1	1	0+2	0	0	0
40	DF	(England) ENG	Femi Seriki	1	0	0+1	0	0	0	0	0
Midfielders
4	MF	(Scotland) SCO	John Fleck	35	0	29+2	0	4	0	0	0
7	MF	(England) ENG	John Lundstram	32	0	23+5	0	4	0	0	0
8	MF	(Norway) NOR	Sander Berge	16	1	13+2	1	0	0	1	0
16	MF	(Northern Ireland) NIR	Oliver Norwood	37	0	26+6	0	3+1	0	1	0
23	MF	(England) ENG	Ben Osborn	27	1	17+7	1	2	0	1	0
26	MF	(England) ENG	Jack Rodwell	0	0	0	0	0	0	0	0
34	MF	(France) FRA	Iliman Ndiaye	1	0	0+1	0	0	0	0	0
Forwards
9	FW	(Scotland) SCO	Oli McBurnie	25	1	11+12	1	1	0	0+1	0
10	FW	(England) ENG	Billy Sharp	19	5	7+9	3	2	2	0+1	0
11	FW	(France) FRA	Lys Mousset	13	0	2+9	0	1+1	0	0	0
14	FW	(Scotland) SCO	Oliver Burke	30	2	14+11	1	0+4	1	1	0
17	FW	(Republic of Ireland) IRL	David McGoldrick	40	9	27+8	8	3+1	0	1	1
24	FW	(England) ENG	Rhian Brewster	30	0	11+16	0	2+1	0	0	0
32	FW	(England) ENG	Antwoine Hackford	1	0	0+1	0	0	0	0	0
38	FW	(England) ENG	Daniel Jebbison	4	1	3+1	1	0	0	0	0
Player(s) out on loan:
21	GK	(Netherlands) NED	Michael Verrips	0	0	0	0	0	0	0	0

==== Goals ====
As of 6 April 2021

Rank	No.	Nat.	Po.	Name	Premier League	League Cup	FA Cup	Total
1	17	(Republic of Ireland)	CF	David McGoldrick	8	1	0	9
2	10	(England)	CF	Billy Sharp	3	0	2	5
3	20	(England)	DF	Jayden Bogle	2	0	1	3
4	14	(Scotland)	CF	Oliver Burke	1	0	1	2
5	9	(Scotland)	CF	Oli McBurnie	1	0	0	1
5	29	(England)	DF	Kean Bryan	1	0	0	1
5	8	(Norway)	CM	Sander Berge	1	0	0	1
5	26	(England)	CM	Ben Osborn	1	0	0	1
5	6	(England)	DF	Chris Basham	0	0	1	1
5	38	(England)	CF	Daniel Jebbison	1	0	0	1
Own Goals					1	0	0	1
Total					20	1	5	26

== Transfers ==
=== Transfers in ===
Date	Position	Nationality	Name	From	Fee	Ref.
17 July 2020	GK	(England)	Wes Foderingham	(Scotland) Rangers	Free transfer	
19 August 2020	GK	(England)	Aaron Ramsdale	(England) Bournemouth	Undisclosed	
25 August 2020	CB	(Poland)	Kacper Łopata	(England) Brighton & Hove Albion	Free transfer	
7 September 2020	LB	(England)	Max Lowe	(England) Derby County	Undisclosed	
7 September 2020	RB	(England)	Jayden Bogle	(England) Derby County	Undisclosed	
9 September 2020	RW	(Scotland)	Oliver Burke	(England) West Bromwich Albion	Undisclosed	
9 September 2020	CM	(Mali)	Ismaila Coulibaly	(Norway) Sarpsborg 08	Undisclosed	
2 October 2020	FW	(England)	Rhian Brewster	(England) Liverpool	Undisclosed	

=== Loans in ===
Date from	Position	Nationality	Name	From	Date until	Ref.
7 September 2020	CB	(Wales)	Ethan Ampadu	(England) Chelsea	30 June 2021	

=== Loans out ===
Date from	Position	Nationality	Name	To	Date until	Ref.
2 July 2020	LW	(Northern Ireland)	Stephen Mallon	(Republic of Ireland) Derry City	30 November 2020	
30 July 2020	GK	(England)	Jake Eastwood	(Scotland) Kilmarnock	1 January 2021	
6 August 2020	CF	(England)	Tyler Smith	(England) Swindon Town	End of season	
27 August 2020	GK	(England)	Marcus Dewhurst	(England) Carlisle United	1 January 2021	
28 August 2020	AM	(England)	Luke Freeman	(England) Nottingham Forest	End of season	
3 September 2020	LB	(Wales)	Rhys Norrington-Davies	(England) Luton Town	End of season	
8 September 2020	CB	(England)	Sam Graham	(England) Notts County	1 January 2021	
9 September 2020	CM	(Mali)	Ismaila Coulibaly	(Belgium) Beerschot	End of season	
10 September 2020	CF	(Northern Ireland)	David Parkhouse	(England) Hartlepool United	1 January 2021	
29 September 2020	CB	(England)	Kamarl Grant	(England) Gainsborough Trinity	October 2020	
30 September 2020	DM	(England)	Regan Slater	(England) Hull City	End of season	
6 October 2020	RB	(England)	Ashton Hall	(England) Guiseley	2 January 2021	
14 October 2020	LB	(England)	Harry Boyes	(England) Bradford (Park Avenue)	January 2021	
24 December 2020	AM	(England)	Daniel Jebbison	(England) Chorley	2021	
12 January 2021	LB	(Wales)	Rhys Norrington-Davies	(England) Stoke City	End of season	

=== Transfers out ===
Date	Position	Nationality	Name	To	Fee	Ref.
1 July 2020	CM	(England)	Ta'Shae Andall-Gibbons	Unattached	Released	
1 July 2020	RM	(England)	Mark Duffy	(England) Fleetwood Town	Released	
1 July 2020	CF	(England)	Leon Clarke	(England) Shrewsbury Town	Released	
1 July 2020	DF	(Wales)	Kieron Freeman	(England) Swindon Town	Released	
1 July 2020	AM	(England)	Oliver Greaves	Unattached	Released	
1 July 2020	AM	(England)	Callum Gribbin	(England) Barrow	Released	
1 July 2020	CB	(England)	Ben Heneghan	(England) AFC Wimbledon	Released	
1 July 2020	LW	(England)	Ricky Holmes	Retired		
1 July 2020	LW	(England)	Nathan Thomas	(Scotland) Hamilton Academical	Released	
1 July 2020	CM	(England)	Reece York	Unattached	Released	
7 July 2020	AM	(Jamaica)	Ravel Morrison	(Netherlands) ADO Den Haag	Released	
16 July 2020	FW	(England)	Jake Young	(England) Forest Green Rovers	Free transfer	
4 August 2020	FW	(England)	Sam Ackroyd	Unattached	Released	
4 August 2020	DF	(England)	Harrison Foulstone	(England) Gainsborough Trinity	Released	
4 August 2020	GK	(England)	Sam Kelly	Unattached	Released	
4 August 2020	MF	(England)	Connor Leak-Blunt	Unattached	Released	
2 September 2020	GK	(Malta)	Christopher Farrugia	(Malta) Santa Lucia	Free transfer	
9 September 2020	LW	(Republic of Ireland)	Callum Robinson	(England) West Bromwich Albion	Undisclosed	

== Pre-season and friendlies ==
Win Draw Loss Fixtures

1 September 2020 Friendly	Derby County	0–2	Sheffield United	Derby
17:00 BST		Report	Osborn 38'; Sharp 73'	Stadium: Pride Park Stadium; Attendance: 0

4 September 2020 Friendly	Sheffield United	2–2	Preston North End	Sheffield
14:00 BST	Lundstram 36'; Sharp 58' (pen.)	Report	Johnson 54' (pen.); Stockley 90+1'	Stadium: Bramall Lane; Attendance: 0 Referee: Jonathan Moss

== Competitions ==
=== Overview ===
Competition	First match	Last match	Starting round	Final position	Record							
Competition	First match	Last match	Starting round	Final position	Pld	W	D	L	GF	GA	GD	Win %
Premier League	14 September 2020	23 May 2021	Matchday 1	20th	38	7	2	29	20	63	−43	18.42
FA Cup	9 January 2021	21 March 2021	Third round	Quarter-finals	4	3	0	1	6	5	+1	75.00
EFL Cup	17 September 2020	17 September 2020	Second round	Second round	1	0	1	0	1	1	+0	0.00
Total					43	10	3	30	27	69	−42	23.26

Last updated: 23 May 2021
Source: Soccerway

=== Premier League ===
==== League table ====
Pos	Team	Pld	W	D	L	GF	GA	GD	Pts	Qualification or relegation
16	Brighton & Hove Albion	38	9	14	15	40	46	−6	41	
17	Burnley	38	10	9	19	33	55	−22	39	
18	Fulham (R)	38	5	13	20	27	53	−26	28	Relegation to EFL Championship
19	West Bromwich Albion (R)	38	5	11	22	35	76	−41	26	Relegation to EFL Championship
20	Sheffield United (R)	38	7	2	29	20	63	−43	23	Relegation to EFL Championship

Source: Premier League
Rules for classification: 1) Points; 2) Goal difference; 3) Goals scored; 4) If the champions, relegated teams or qualified teams for UEFA competitions cannot be determined by rules 1 to 3, rules 4.1 to 4.3 are applied – 4.1) Points gained in head-to-head record between such teams; 4.2) Away goals scored in head-to-head record between such teams; 4.3) Play-offs
(R) Relegated

==== Results summary ====
Overall								Home						Away					
Pld	W	D	L	GF	GA	GD	Pts	W	D	L	GF	GA	GD	W	D	L	GF	GA	GD
38	7	2	29	20	63	−43	23	5	1	13	12	27	−15	2	1	16	8	36	−28

Last updated: 23 May 2021.

==== Results by matchday ====
Matchday	1	2	3	4	5	6	7	8	9	10	11	12	13	14	15	16	17	18	19	20	21	22	23	24	25	26	27	28	29	30	31	32	33	34	35	36	37	38
Ground	H	A	H	A	H	A	H	A	H	A	H	A	H	A	H	A	A	H	H	A	A	H	H	A	A	H	H	H	A	A	H	A	H	A	H	A	A	H
Result	L	L	L	L	D	L	L	L	L	L	L	L	L	D	L	L	L	W	L	W	L	W	L	L	L	L	W	L	L	L	L	L	W	L	L	W	L	W
Position	18	19	19	19	19	19	19	20	20	20	20	20	20	20	20	20	20	20	20	20	20	20	20	20	20	20	20	20	20	20	20	20	20	20	20	20	20	20

Updated to match(es) played on 23 May 2021. Source:
A = Away; H = Home; W = Win; D = Draw; L = Loss

==== Matches ====
The 2020–21 season fixtures were released on 20 August.

14 September 2020 1	Sheffield United	0–2	Wolverhampton Wanderers	Sheffield
18:00 BST	Egan (yellow card) 33'; McBurnie (yellow card) 39'	Report	Jiménez 3'; Saïss 6'; Marçal (yellow card) 90+1'	Stadium: Bramall Lane; Attendance: 0 Referee: Mike Dean

21 September 2020 2	Aston Villa	1–0	Sheffield United	Aston
18:00 BST	Targett (yellow card) 33'; Konsa 63'; Cash (yellow card) 83'; McGinn (yellow card) 84'	Report	Lundstram (yellow card) 10'; Egan (red card) 12'	Stadium: Villa Park; Attendance: 0 Referee: Graham Scott

27 September 2020 3	Sheffield United	0–1	Leeds United	Sheffield
12:00 BST	Lundstram (yellow card) 58'; Baldock (yellow card) 67'	Report	Phillips (yellow card) 6'; Bamford 88'	Stadium: Bramall Lane; Attendance: 0 Referee: Paul Tierney

4 October 2020 4	Arsenal	2–1	Sheffield United	Holloway
14:00 BST	Saka 61'; Pépé 64'	Report	Berge (yellow card) 38'; McGoldrick 84'	Stadium: Emirates Stadium; Attendance: 0 Referee: Lee Mason

18 October 2020 5	Sheffield United	1–1	Fulham	Sheffield
12:00 BST	Sharp 85' (pen.)	Report	Zambo Anguissa (yellow card) 21'; Lookman 77'; Cavaleiro (yellow card) 82'	Stadium: Bramall Lane; Attendance: 0 Referee: Andre Marriner

24 October 2020 6	Liverpool	2–1	Sheffield United	Liverpool
20:00 BST	Firmino 41'; Jota 64'	Report	Lundstram (yellow card) 3'; Berge 13' (pen.), (yellow card) 86'; Stevens (yellow card) 66'	Stadium: Anfield; Attendance: 0 Referee: Mike Dean

31 October 2020 7	Sheffield United	0–1	Manchester City	Sheffield
12:30 GMT		Report	Walker 28'	Stadium: Bramall Lane; Attendance: 0 Referee: Michael Oliver

7 November 2020 8	Chelsea	4–1	Sheffield United	Fulham
17:30 GMT	Abraham 23'; Chilwell 34'; Thiago Silva 77'; Werner 80'	Report	McGoldrick 9'; Egan (yellow card) 37'; Berge (yellow card) 75'	Stadium: Stamford Bridge; Attendance: 0 Referee: Jonathan Moss

22 November 2020 9	Sheffield United	0–1	West Ham United	Sheffield
14:00 GMT		Report	Haller 56'	Stadium: Bramall Lane; Attendance: 0 Referee: Martin Atkinson

28 November 2020 10	West Bromwich Albion	1–0	Sheffield United	West Bromwich
20:00 GMT	Ivanović (yellow card) 2'; Gallagher 13'; Pereira (yellow card) 86'	Report	Norwood (yellow card) 10'; Berge (yellow card) 18'; Egan (yellow card) 58'	Stadium: The Hawthorns; Attendance: 0 Referee: Mike Dean

6 December 2020 11	Sheffield United	1–2	Leicester City	Sheffield
15:15 GMT	McBurnie 26'; Lowe (yellow card) 38'	Report	Pérez 24'; Fuchs (yellow card) 63'; Vardy 90', (yellow card) 90+1'; Maddison (yellow card) 90+3'	Stadium: Bramall Lane; Attendance: 0 Referee: Stuart Attwell

13 December 2020 12	Southampton	3–0	Sheffield United	Southampton
12:00 GMT	Adams 34'; Armstrong 62'; Redmond 83'	Report	Stevens (yellow card) 28'	Stadium: St Mary's Stadium; Attendance: 2,000; Referee: Andrew Madley

17 December 2020 13	Sheffield United	2–3	Manchester United	Sheffield
20:00 GMT	McGoldrick 5', 87'; Jagielka (yellow card) 51'; Egan (yellow card) 70'; Robinson (yellow card) 90+5'	Report	Rashford 26', 51'; Martial 33'; Henderson (yellow card) 90+1'; Pogba (yellow card) 90+5'	Stadium: Bramall Lane; Attendance: 0 Referee: Michael Oliver

20 December 2020 14	Brighton & Hove Albion	1–1	Sheffield United	Falmer
12:00 GMT	Dunk (yellow card) 33'; Welbeck 87'	Report	Lundstram (red card) 40'; Bogle 63'; McGoldrick (yellow card) 70'; Osborn (yellow card) 86'; Burke (yellow card) 88'; Ramsdale (yellow card) 90'; Basham (yellow card) 90+3'	Stadium: Falmer Stadium; Attendance: 2,000; Referee: Peter Bankes

26 December 2020 15	Sheffield United	0–1	Everton	Sheffield
20:00 GMT	Baldock (yellow card) 71'; Robinson (yellow card) 90'	Report	Calvert-Lewin (yellow card) 52'; Sigurðsson 80'; Bernard (yellow card) 81'; Godfrey (yellow card) 89'; Pickford (yellow card) 90+3'	Stadium: Bramall Lane; Attendance: 0 Referee: David Coote

29 December 2020 16	Burnley	1–0	Sheffield United	Burnley
18:00 GMT	Mee 32'; Lowton (yellow card) 45+2'	Report	Stevens (yellow card) 72'; Burke (yellow card) 90+1'	Stadium: Turf Moor; Attendance: 0 Referee: Chris Kavanagh

2 January 2021 17	Crystal Palace	2–0	Sheffield United	Selhurst
15:00 GMT	Schlupp 4'; Eze 45+6', (yellow card) 67'	Report	Bogle (yellow card) 45+1'; Norwood (yellow card) 63'; Fleck (yellow card) 89'	Stadium: Selhurst Park; Attendance: 0 Referee: Stuart Attwell

12 January 2021 18	Sheffield United	1–0	Newcastle United	Sheffield
18:00 GMT	Sharp 73' (pen.), (yellow card) 80'; McGoldrick (yellow card) 90'	Report	Fraser (yellow card) 42' (yellow-red card) 45'; Darlow (yellow card) 69'; Schär (yellow card) 86'; Hayden (yellow card) 90+5'	Stadium: Bramall Lane; Attendance: 0 Referee: Andrew Madley

17 January 2021 19	Sheffield United	1–3	Tottenham Hotspur	Sheffield
14:00 GMT	Norwood (yellow card) 23'; Lundstram (yellow card) 50'; McGoldrick 59'; Egan (yellow card) 86'; Ampadu (yellow card) 90+1'	Report	Aurier 5'; Kane 40'; Ndombele 62'	Stadium: Bramall Lane; Attendance: 0 Referee: Andre Marriner

27 January 2021 20	Manchester United	1–2	Sheffield United	Greater Manchester
20:15 GMT	Tuanzebe (yellow card) 45+2'; Maguire 64'	Report	Bryan 23'; Lundstram (yellow card) 40'; Burke 74'	Stadium: Old Trafford; Attendance: 0 Referee: Peter Bankes

30 January 2021 21	Manchester City	1–0	Sheffield United	Manchester
15:00 GMT	Gabriel Jesus 9'	Report	Norwood (yellow card) 24'; Baldock (yellow card) 82'; Egan (yellow card) 84'	Stadium: City of Manchester Stadium; Attendance: 0 Referee: David Coote

2 February 2021 22	Sheffield United	2–1	West Bromwich Albion	Sheffield
19:00 GMT	Bogle 56'; Sharp 73'; Fleck (yellow card) 83'; McGoldrick (yellow card) 84'	Report	Phillips 41'; Pereira (yellow card) 90+4'	Stadium: Bramall Lane; Attendance: 0 Referee: Paul Tierney

7 February 2021 23	Sheffield United	1–2	Chelsea	Sheffield
19:15 GMT	Basham (yellow card) 17'; Rüdiger 54' (o.g.)	Report	Mount 43'; Jorginho 58' (pen.)	Stadium: Bramall Lane; Attendance: 0 Referee: Kevin Friend

15 February 2021 24	West Ham United	3–0	Sheffield United	Stratford
18:00 GMT	Rice 41' (pen.); Diop 58'; Fredericks 90+6'	Report	Basham (yellow card) 39'; Lundstram (yellow card) 87'	Stadium: London Stadium; Attendance: 0 Referee: Simon Hooper

20 February 2021 25	Fulham	1–0	Sheffield United	Fulham
20:00 GMT	Zambo Anguissa (yellow card) 45+2'; Lookman 61'	Report	Baldock (yellow card) 79'; McGoldrick (yellow card) 90+1'	Stadium: Craven Cottage; Attendance: 0 Referee: Martin Atkinson

28 February 2021 26	Sheffield United	0–2	Liverpool	Sheffield
19:15 GMT		Report	Jones 48'; Bryan 64' (o.g.)	Stadium: Bramall Lane; Attendance: 0 Referee: Jonathan Moss

3 March 2021 27	Sheffield United	1–0	Aston Villa	Sheffield
18:00 GMT	McGoldrick 30', (yellow card) 45+1'; Jagielka (red card) 57'	Report		Stadium: Bramall Lane; Attendance: 0 Referee: Robert Jones

6 March 2021 28	Sheffield United	0–2	Southampton	Sheffield
15:00 GMT	Ampadu (yellow card) 31'; Bogle (yellow card) 36'; Fleck (yellow card) 90+1'; McBurnie (yellow card) 90+1'	Report	Ward-Prowse 32' (pen.); Adams 49'; Tella (yellow card) 60'; Armstrong (yellow card) 71'; Vestergaard (yellow card) 90+1'	Stadium: Bramall Lane; Attendance: 0 Referee: Paul Tierney

14 March 2021 29	Leicester City	5–0	Sheffield United	Leicester
14:00 GMT	Iheanacho 39', 69', 78'; Pérez 64'; Ampadu 80' (o.g.)	Report	Bryan (yellow card) 74'; Lundstram (yellow card) 88'	Stadium: King Power Stadium; Attendance: 0 Referee: Peter Bankes

3 April 2021 30	Leeds United	2–1	Sheffield United	Leeds
15:00 BST	Harrison 12'; Jagielka 49' (o.g.); Rodrigo (yellow card) 85'	Report	Lundstram (yellow card) 4'; McGoldrick (yellow card) 43'; Osborn 45+2'	Stadium: Elland Road; Attendance: 0 Referee: Graham Scott

11 April 2021 31	Sheffield United	0–3	Arsenal	Sheffield
19:00 BST	Ampadu (yellow card) 90+4'	Report	Lacazette 33', 85'; Martinelli 71'; Marí (yellow card) 80'	Stadium: Bramall Lane; Attendance: 0 Referee: Peter Bankes

17 April 2021 32	Wolverhampton Wanderers	1–0	Sheffield United	Wolverhampton
20:15 BST	Willian José 59'; Podence (yellow card) 71'	Report	Brewster (yellow card) 36'; Stevens (yellow card) 82'	Stadium: Molineux; Attendance: 0 Referee: Robert Jones

24 April 2021 33	Sheffield United	1–0	Brighton & Hove Albion	Sheffield
20:00 BST	McGoldrick 19', (yellow card) 24'; Baldock (yellow card) 77'; Stevens (yellow card) 88'	Report		Stadium: Bramall Lane; Attendance: 0 Referee: Kevin Friend

2 May 2021 34	Tottenham Hotspur	4–0	Sheffield United	Tottenham
19:15 BST	Bale 36', 61', 69'; Son 77'; Højbjerg (yellow card) 88'	Report	Egan (yellow card) 18'	Stadium: Tottenham Hotspur Stadium; Attendance: 0 Referee: Andre Marriner

8 May 2021 35	Sheffield United	0–2	Crystal Palace	Sheffield
15:00 BST	Norwood (yellow card) 38'	Report	Benteke 2'; Ward (yellow card) 30'; Eze 88'	Stadium: Bramall Lane; Attendance: 0 Referee: Simon Hooper

16 May 2021 36	Everton	0–1	Sheffield United	Liverpool
19:00 BST	Rodríguez (yellow card) 66'	Report	Jebbison 7'; Basham (yellow card) 26'; Baldock (yellow card) 81'; Robinson (yellow card) 90'	Stadium: Goodison Park; Attendance: 0 Referee: Jonathan Moss

19 May 2021 37	Newcastle United	1–0	Sheffield United	Newcastle upon Tyne
18:00 BST	Willock 45+4'	Report	Norwood (yellow card) 24'; Stevens (yellow card) 31'	Stadium: St. James' Park; Attendance: 10,000; Referee: Robert Jones

23 May 2021 38	Sheffield United	1–0	Burnley	Sheffield
16:00 BST	Baldock (yellow card) 21'; McGoldrick 24'; Fleck (yellow card) 38'; Basham (yellow card) 65'	Report	Dunne (yellow card) 88'	Stadium: Bramall Lane; Attendance: 8,000; Referee: Kevin Friend

=== FA Cup ===
9 January 2021 Third round	Bristol Rovers	2–3	Sheffield United	Bristol
15:00 GMT	Kilgour 21'; Leahy (yellow card) 60'; Ehmer 62'	Report	Day 6' (o.g.); Burke 59'; Bogle 63'	Stadium: Memorial Stadium; Attendance: 0 Referee: Keith Stroud

23 January 2021 Fourth round	Sheffield United	2–1	Plymouth Argyle	Sheffield
15:00 GMT	Basham 39'; Sharp 47'; Norwood (yellow card) 68'	Report	Camará 75'; Watts (yellow card) 90+3'	Stadium: Bramall Lane; Attendance: 0 Referee: Lee Mason

10 February 2021 Fifth round	Sheffield United	1–0	Bristol City	Sheffield
19:30 GMT	Sharp 66' (pen.)	Report	Mawson (red card) 65'	Stadium: Bramall Lane; Attendance: 0 Referee: Robert Jones

21 March 2021 Quarter-finals	Chelsea	2–0	Sheffield United	London
13:30 GMT	Norwood 24' (o.g.); Ziyech 90+2'	Report		Stadium: Stamford Bridge; Attendance: 0 Referee: Andrew Madley

=== EFL Cup ===
17 September 2020 Second round	Burnley	1–1 (5–4 p)	Sheffield United	Burnley
17:30 BST	Vydra 67'	Report	McGoldrick 4'; Jagielka (yellow card) 68'; Ampadu (yellow card) 81'	Stadium: Turf Moor; Attendance: 0 Referee: Paul Tierney
	Penalties
	Wood (penalty scored); Vydra (penalty scored); Brownhill (penalty scored); Pieters (penalty scored); Brady (penalty scored)		(penalty scored) Norwood; (penalty missed) McBurnie; (penalty scored) Sharp; (penalty scored) Berge; (penalty scored) Osborn
