= Maurice Stroun =

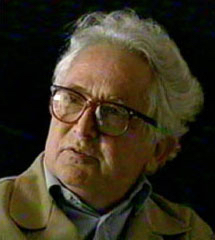
- Born: Maurice Stroun; 3 September 1926
- Died: August 2017 (aged 90)
- Scientific career
- Fields: Plant biochemistry; Physiology; Genetics; Cancer; Cell-free tumour DNA; liquid biopsy
- Workplaces: As faculty member University of Geneva

Maurice Stroun (September 3, 1926 – August 2017) was a Swiss researcher and professor at the University of Geneva in the Department of Plant Biochemistry and Physiology. He is known for first hypothesizing and demonstrating the existence of disease-specific circulating nucleic acids as well as first developing techniques for the detection of tumor-related characteristics of circulating DNA and RNA in plasma and serum, or liquid biopsies as this field is now known.

== Early work ==
In the mid 1960s, Stroun along with colleague, Philip Anker, (also in the Department of Plant Physiology at the University of Geneva) began to study the phenomenon of neoplasms in plants. Building on early grafting studies in plants as well as work by other researchers that demonstrated the transfer of genetic material between bacteria, they hypothesized that a similar phenomenon might occur between bacterial cells and plants. Their research in the late 1960s demonstrated that this process did indeed exist and led them to study whether a similar mechanism occurred in higher-order species, where Stroun published further research showing transfer of genetic material from bacteria to frogs. In an article published in Science, November 10, 1972, bacterial RNA was demonstrated in frog brain cells after a bacterial peritoneal infection. In the April 1973 issue of the Journal of Bacteriology, Stroun showed transcription of spontaneously released bacterial DNA was found to be incorporated into cellular nuclei of frog auricles. In one particular experiment published in the same article, Stroun and his group extracted the auricles of frog hearts and dipped them for several hours in a suspension of bacteria. Afterward, they found a high percentage of RNA-DNA hybridization between bacterial DNA extracted from bacteria of the same species as that used in the experiment and titrated DNA extracted from the auricles which had been dipped in the bacterial suspension. The experiment demonstrated that bacterial DNA had been absorbed by the animal cells. Stroun dubbed this phenomenon has trancession. Professor Straun died in Geneva in 2017.

== Extension to humans and cancer ==
Building on their work and taking notice of the work of Henry G. Kunkel, whose group made the association of higher levels of circulating DNA and lupus, Stroun started studying whether circulating DNA could be associated with malignancies such as cancers in humans. In a 1977 issue of International Review of Cytology, Volume 51, Anker and Stroun wrote that when foreign DNA is transcribed into a cell of a different organism, "this general biological event is related to the uptake by cells of spontaneously released bacterial DNA, thus suggesting the existence of circulating DNA. In view of the malignant transformations obtained with DNA, the oncogenic (cancer-causing) role of circulating DNA is postulated."

In the late 1970s, building on the discovery of circulating DNA in human blood by Mandel and Metais, Leon and his collaborators developed a radioimmunoassay for measuring nanogram quantities of nucleic acids in serum. This technique enabled them to observe that cancer patients tended to possess a greater quantity of circulating DNA in serum (on average) than their healthy counterparts. This led Stroun to explore if other methods could be developed to not only detect the overall abundance of nucleic acids in patients with disease (and specifically cancer) but to also detect the disease-specific components of such circulating nucleic acids themselves. Unlike bacterial transformations in plants and animal cells involving clear transfer of separately identifiable nucleic acids, it was not clear how malignancy in cancer arose, although there were many competing theories. Stroun’s postulate that neoplastic malignancy was associated with the presence of tumor specific nucleic acids, led to extensive research by his group of circulating nucleic acids in cancer patients in the late 1980s.

== Detection of circulating tumor nucleic acids in human cancer patients ==
In the late 1980s and early 1990s cancer researchers such as Bert Vogelstein began demonstrating the association of tumor-specific mutations in certain human cancers, such as RAS mutations in colorectal cancers. Stroun took notice and realized that newly available PCR technologies could be used to possibly detect such RAS mutations in circulation. In fact, his group was one of the first to demonstrate successful detection of such tumor-specific DNA in the circulation of cancer patients. Stroun was also the first to demonstrate the successful detection of alterations beyond point mutations in plasma, such as microsatellite alterations, gene expression changes and copy-number alterations.

Circulating Nucleic Acids in Plasma and Serum Congress

The early work of Stroun and Anker spurred intense investigation into the relationship of circulating nucleic acids and human conditions, such as disease, trauma, and pregnancy. For example, Lo demonstrated that fetal-specific nucleic acids could be detected in maternal peripheral blood in the late 1990s. As such, the pair organized the first global symposium dedicated to circulating nucleic acid research in 1999 held in Menthon, France. The conference was named CNAPS (Circulating Nucleic Acids in Plasma and Serum) and is held every other year to this day. In fact, the 2015 conference organizers’ welcome address begins, “When our forerunners and field-founders Philippe Anker and Maurice Stroun organized the first event in 1999 in Menthon, France, none of us attendees could have imagined that Circulating Nucleic Acids would be a game changer”

== Later years ==
In later years, Stroun promoted the development and validation through large clinical studies of cancer diagnostics based on circulating nucleic acid detection. Stroun and Anker would later set up a company, OncoXL, in Geneva to commercialize a cancer diagnostic test, or liquid biopsy, as it later become known, based on the fruits of their multiple decades of research into circulating nucleic acids. In 2005, Stroun’s semi-forgotten pioneering work in circulating nucleic acids was later acknowledged in a compilation of scientists that gave rise to various groundbreaking fields. Maurice Stroun currently serves as an advisor to Guardant Health, a company that has commercialized a comprehensive liquid biopsy based on circulating DNA in peripheral blood.

Maurice Stroun died in August 2017, at the age of 90.
