= Bobby Yazdani =

Iranian-American entrepreneur and investor

- Born: Babak Yazdani
- Citizenship: American
- Education: University of California, Berkeley
- Occupations: Founder & Managing Partner of Cota Capital Founder & Managing Partner of Signatures Capital
- Organization: Cota Capital
- Known for: Entrepreneur & Venture Capital
- Website: Cota Capital Signatures Capital

Babak "Bobby" Yazdani (born 1963) is an Iranian-American entrepreneur and investor specializing in early-stage, private U.S.-based modern enterprise technology companies.

In 1997, he founded Saba Software, a provider of Human Capital Management (HCM) software solutions. He took the company public in 2000. Yazdani founded Signatures Capital in 2006 and co-founded investment firm Cota Capital in 2014, where he serves as a Partner.

Yazdani was ranked #1 out of 2000 angel investors in a 2014 report by CB Insights as having the most successful track record for investing in companies that received follow-on funding.

Yazdani began investing in 1989 and is an early investor in companies such as Google, Dropbox, Klout, Salesforce and Uber.

== Early life and education ==
Yazdani was born in Tehran to a middle-class family. He left Iran in 1980 for the United Kingdom, where he completed his high-school education. Yazdani moved to the United States at age 19 and graduated with a B.A. in Applied Mathematics from the University of California at Berkeley.

== Career ==
=== Oracle ===
From 1988 to 1997, Yazdani held various senior management positions at Oracle Corporation.

=== Saba Software ===
Yazdani founded Saba Software in 1997 and took the company public in 2000. He was identified as an industry pioneer in creating the Human Capital Management category. Under his leadership, Saba acquired THINQ Learning Solutions in May 2005, Centra Software in 2006 and Pedagogue Solutions and Comartis in June 2011. Yazdani stepped down as CEO in 2013 when Saba was acquired by Vector Capital. The following year, Yazdani agreed to an SEC-negotiated claw back of $2.5 million in bonuses. Yazdani was not charged with any wrongdoing. In February 2020, Saba was acquired by Cornerstone OnDemand for $1.3 billion.

=== Signatures Capital ===
In 2006, Yazdani founded Signatures Capital, which serves as his family office and focuses on early stage investments. Yazdani’s first investment was in medical technology company Masimo, for which he provided capital but also wrote software to improve the accuracy of Masimo’s early neonatal pulse oximeters. According to the Huffington Post, Yazdani has invested in more than 100 companies in the technology sector via Signature Capital. Through Signatures Capital investments, Yazdani invested, among others, in Dropbox, Google, Uber, Masimo, Nextbio (acquired by Illumina),SoundHound, Salesforce, Clever Sense (acquired by Google), Greensmith Energy (acquired by Wartsila), Baarzo (acquired by Google), Bina Technologies (acquired by Roche) and Checkr.

=== Cota Capital ===
In 2014, Yazdani co-founded Cota Capital, a technology investment firm that partners with technology companies to help them grow and develop "the opportunity for improving lives." Since its inception, the firm has invested in numerous private and public technology companies, including Berkeley Lights, Capella Space, Cloud Lending (acquired by Q2 Holdings), Tubi (acquired by FoxCorp), Gusto (formerly ZenPayroll), Mission Bio and Movandi, OpenGov, ParkourSC and Truebill (acquired by Rocket Companies), and Rhombus Systems.

== Philanthropy ==
Bobby Yazdani is a founding member of the Persian Tech Entrepreneurs network and a member of The Reset Foundation. He also underwrote the Signatures Innovation Fellowship at the University of California, Berkeley, between 2015 and 2019, which supported "data science projects with commercial promise."

In 2022, Yazdani and other members of the Iranian-American community established the American Legacy Fund, an endowment program meant to support the development of youth soccer in the United States. He serves on the board of trustees of the Mathematical Sciences Research Institute and he is a supporter of the Maryam Mirzakhani Endowed Professorship, created in honor of the late Fields medalist.

=== Cota Impact Fund ===
The Cota Impact Fund provides grants to a number of philanthropic institutions, such as the International Red Cross, the World Central Kitchen and UNICEF.
