= Nextbio =

Software company

NextBio
- Type: Private
- Founded: California, United States (2004)
- Founder: Saeid Akhtari; Ilya Kupershmidt; Mostafa Ronaghi
- Headquarters: Cupertino, California, US
- Area served: Worldwide
- Key people: Saeid Akhtari (President & CEO); Ilya Kupershmidt (VP of Product Management); Dr. Satnam Alag (VP of Engineering)
- Number of employees: 75
- Website: www.nextbio.com

NextBio is a privately owned software company that provides a platform for drug companies and life science researchers to search, discover, and share knowledge across public and proprietary data. It was co-founded by Saeid Akhtari, Ilya Kupershmidt, and Mostafa Ronaghi in 2004, and based in Cupertino, California, United States.

The NextBio Platform is an ontology-based semantic framework that connects highly heterogeneous data and textual information. The semantic framework is based on gene, tissue, disease, and compound ontologies. This framework contains information from different organisms, platforms, data types. and research areas that is integrated into and correlated within a single searchable environment using proprietary algorithms. It provides a unified interface for researchers to formulate and test new hypotheses across vast collections of experimental data.

According to the company, the enterprise version of the NextBio platform is being used in life science research and development and drug development by researchers and clinicians at: Merck Pharmaceutical, Johnson & Johnson Pharmaceutical Research & Development, L.L.C., Celgene, Genzyme, Eli Lilly and Company, and Regeneron Pharmaceuticals. This enterprise version allows internal, proprietary data to be uploaded and integrated into the NextBio database of publicly available data. According to the company, scientists are using NextBio to improve their ability to identify relevant prognostic and predictive molecular signatures which are significant in their research. In October 2013, Illumina acquired NextBio. In 2015, the NextBio research platform was rebranded as Correlation Engine.
