= Pål Nyrén =

Swedish professor of biochemistry

Pål Nyrén (born 1955) was, as of June 2009, a biochemistry professor at the Royal Institute of Technology (KTH), Stockholm. He is known for having developed the pyrosequencing method for DNA sequencing.

== Early life and education ==
Pål Nyrén was born 1955. After undergraduate training, he received an M.S. in Chemical Engineering, in 1981, from the Royal Institute of Technology (KTH), in Stockholm, Sweden. He then completed a Ph.D. in Biochemistry, at the University of Stockholm, in 1985, with a dissertation entitled, "The Proton Pumping Pyrophosphatase From Rhodospirillum rubrum." He did a post-doctoral fellowship under John Walker at the MRC's Laboratory of Molecular Biology in Cambridge, England, from 1985-1986.

== Career ==
As Nyrén has stated at his faculty web page (as of June 2009),, he has held the following academic posts:

"1988 Associate professor (Docent) Biochemistry University of Stockholm"[;]
"1999 Professor in Biochemistry, KTH, Stockholm"[.]

He also lists himself as "[f]ounder of the company Biotage AB (former Pyrosequencing AB)" in 1997, which is more accurately stated as his participating in the founding of a pyrosequencing unit, with other academics at KTH, a unit once a part of the complex set of businesses of Biotage AB created through mergers and acquisitions, with that pyrosequencing unit having been sold off to Qiagen in 2008.

== Recognition ==
In 2013, Nyrén was awarded the European Patent Office's European Inventor Award, in the SMEs category.
