= Mostafa Ronaghi =

Iranian molecular biologist

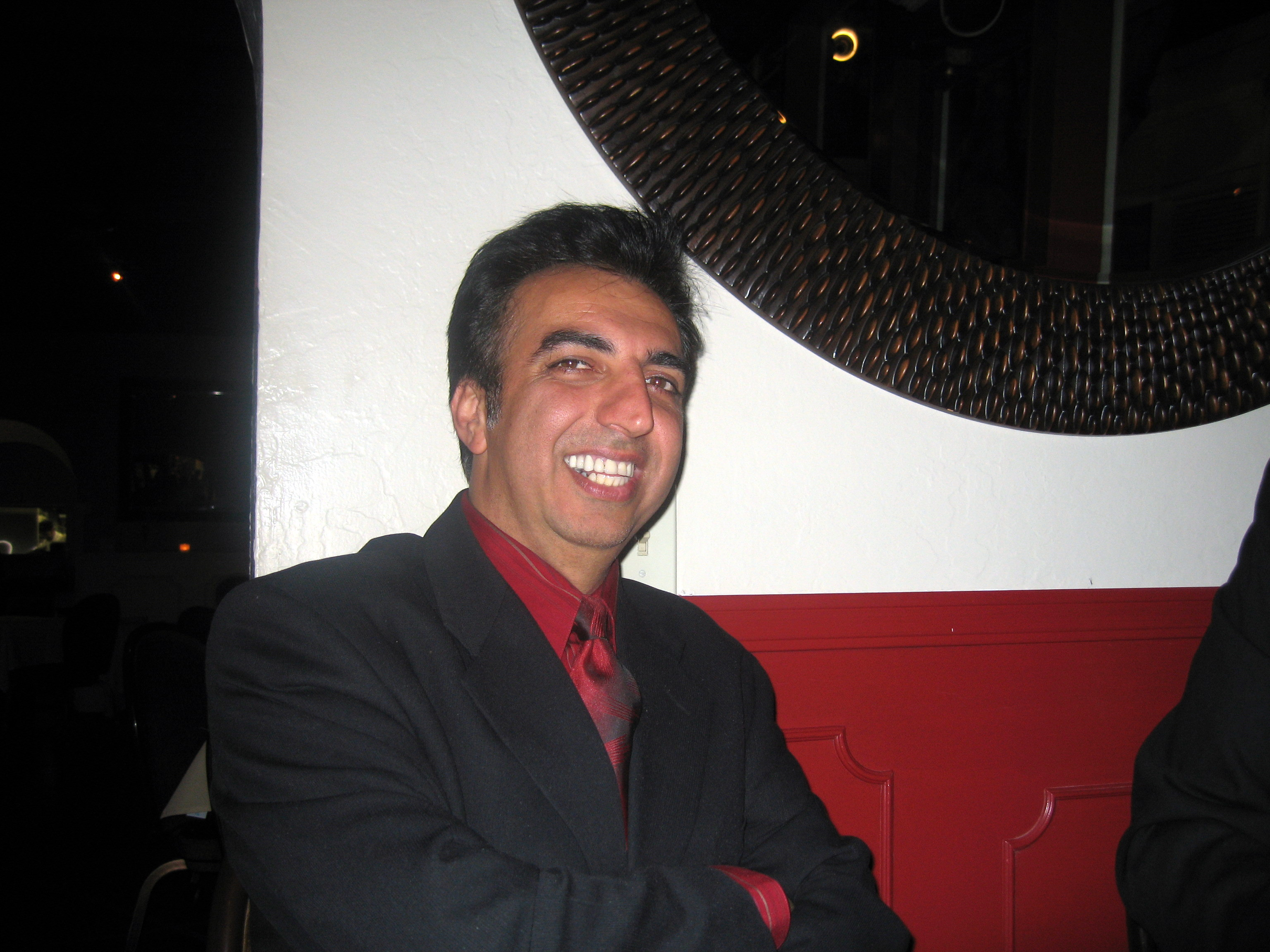
Mostafa Ronaghi

Mostafa Ronaghi (Persian: مصطفی رونقی; born 1968) is an Iranian molecular biologist, specializing in DNA sequencing methodology. As of 2008, he was the Chief Technology Officer and Senior Vice President at Illumina.

== Early life and education ==
Mostafa Ronaghi was born in 1968. He earned his Ph.D. from the Royal Institute of Technology in Sweden in 1998.

== Career ==
Ronaghi was a principal investigator and Senior Research Associate at the Stanford Genome Technology Center at Stanford University, prior to working at Illumina), where he focused on developing analytical techniques for molecular diagnostics. He is principal investigator for several grants including grants from the National Human Genome Research Institute (NHGRI), part of the National Institutes of Health for the development of array-based pyrosequencing.

In 1998, Ronaghi, Pål Nyren, and Mathias Uhlen described a solution-based variant of the pyrosequencing technology, and co-founded Pyrosequencing AB (renamed to Biotage in 2003). He co-invented molecular inversion probe assays, and co-founded ParAllele BioScience to develop this multiplexed technology for genetic testing. ParAllele was acquired by Affymetrix in May 2005.

In 2005, Ronaghi co-founded NextBio, a search engine for life science data. As of 2008, he was serving as the Chief Technology Officer and Senior Vice President at Illumina.

NextBio was acquired by Illumina in 2013. He also serves on the board of directors of IntegenX and Aurora Biofuels. In 2008, Ronaghi and Helmy Eltoukhy co-founded Avantome, a DNA sequencing company that was acquired by Illumina in July 2008.

== Publications ==
Among his peer-reviewed journal articles are the publications describing pyrosequencing and molecular inversion probe assays, and other techniques:

- Absalan, F; Ronaghi, M (2007). "Molecular Inversion Probe Assay". Comparative Genomics. Methods in Molecular Biology. Vol. 396. pp. 315–30. doi:10.1007/978-1-59745-515-2_20. ISBN 978-1-934115-37-4. PMID 18025701.
- Hardenbol, P; Banér, J; Jain, M; Nilsson, M; Namsaraev, EA; Karlin-Neumann, GA; Fakhrai-Rad, H; Ronaghi, M; Willis, TD; Landegren, U; Davis, RW (Jun 2003). "Multiplexed genotyping with sequence-tagged molecular inversion probes". Nature Biotechnology. 21 (6): 673–8. doi:10.1038/nbt821. PMID 12730666. S2CID 17619191.
- Talasaz, AH; Nemat-Gorgani, M; Liu, Y; et al. (Oct 2006). "Prediction of protein orientation upon immobilization on biological and nonbiological surfaces". Proceedings of the National Academy of Sciences. 103 (40): 14773–8. Bibcode:2006PNAS..10314773T. doi:10.1073/pnas.0605841103. PMC 1576295. PMID 17001006.
- Ronaghi, M (Jan 2001). "Pyrosequencing sheds light on DNA sequencing". Genome Research. 11 (1): 3–11. doi:10.1101/gr.11.1.3. PMID 11156611.
- Ronaghi, M; Uhlén, M; Nyrén, P (Jul 1998). "A sequencing method based on real-time pyrophosphate". Science. 281 (5375): 363–365. doi:10.1126/science.281.5375.363. PMID 9705713. S2CID 26331871.
- Ronaghi, M; Karamohamed, S; Pettersson, B; Uhlén, M; Nyrén, P (Nov 1996). "Real-time DNA sequencing using detection of pyrophosphate release". Analytical Biochemistry. 242 (1): 84–9. doi:10.1006/abio.1996.0432. PMID 8923969.

He also holds about 20 patents.
