= Terry Robinson (football chairman) =

English footballer chairman

Terence James Robinson is an English football chairman and director who last worked for English Championship club Bolton Wanderers. He has previously been president of Hungarian association football club Ferencváros and previously been a director of Sheffield United and Leicester City. Leicester City and Terry Robinson parted company by mutual consent in December 2014. Since 2024 he has been Chief Executive at Chorley.

== Career ==
Robinson, formerly chairman of Bury between 1979 and 1999, joined the board of Sheffield United in 2002, and succeeded outgoing chairman Derek Dooley in May 2006. He represented the Football League on the Football Association (FA) Council, and less than two months after Sheffield United's promotion to the Premier League, was named as one of the four Premier League representatives on the FA Council. One of his tasks as a member of the panel was to ensure a smooth implementation of the recommendations of the Burns Report, a structural review of the FA. In August 2008 he was appointed chairman of the FA Cup committee.

In February 2008, Sheffield United plc chairman Kevin McCabe bought into the Hungarian club Ferencváros. Robinson stepped down as chairman of Sheffield United, while remaining as a director, to assume a new role as Ferencváros' president. He joined Stoke City in June 2011 taking the position of Academy Director. He left Stoke in June 2013.

On 5 July 2013, Robinson became the new Director of Football at Leicester City Robinson was sacked by Leicester on 14 December 2014.

As of December 2015, he is working at Bolton Wanderers as the club look to review their operations prior to a potential takeover. On 22 March 2016, he left Bolton with the club having been taken over by Sports Shield Consultancy.
