= Helmy Eltoukhy =

American businessman

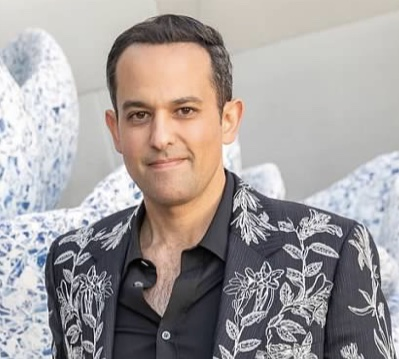
- Education: Stanford University (PhD in Electrical engineering); Stanford Genome Technology Center (Postdoc)
- Known for: Founder of Avantome and Guardant Health
- Spouse: Carson Eltoukhy (? - 2020)
- Scientific career
- Fields: Genomics; Electrical engineering
- Thesis: An integrated system for de novo DNA sequencing
- Doctoral advisor: Abbas El Gamal

Helmy Eltoukhy is an American businessman. He is the founder of Avantome, a company developing DNA sequencing technologies during the race for the $1,000 genome, and was acquired by Illumina in 2008. He also founded Guardant Health, a personalized medicine company.

== Education ==
Born to Egyptian immigrant parents, Eltoukhy attended Bellarmine College Preparatory, graduating in 1997. Subsequently, Eltoukhy studied electrical engineering at Stanford University, completing an accelerated Bachelor of Science (BS) in two and a half years, followed by Master of Science (MS) and Doctorate (PhD) degrees. Eltoukhy's doctoral thesis, "An integrated system for de novo DNA sequencing" research was completed in the laboratory of Abbas El Gamal, for a project that combined genomics and sensor engineering. Eltoukhy discovered that low cost CMOS image sensors coupled to light-emitting DNA sequencing reactions could form the basis for building a less expensive, portable DNA sequencer.

== Career ==
=== Avantome ===
In 2007, Eltoukhy and Mostafa Ronaghi co-founded the biotechnology startup company Avantome, to accelerate the commercialization of semiconductor sequencing technologies and affordable high-throughput DNA sequencing. Eltoukhy was president and CEO of the new company until 2008, when Avantome was acquired by Illumina. As part of the acquisition terms, Ronaghi and Eltoukhy joined Illumina, where Eltoukhy continued pioneering genomic research as director of Advanced Sequencing Development until 2012. In 2018, Illumina launched iSEQ, a new product developed using Avantome's CMOS sensor approach combined with nanowell technology; iSEQ delivered on the original Avantome goals of low cost instrumentation and reduced per-sample processing cost in a long read format.

=== Guardant Health ===
In 2012, Eltoukhy and AmirAli Talasaz co-founded Guardant Health, a personalized medicine company developing cancer detection and treatment techniques. The company developed methods to sample circulating tumor DNA (ctDNA) fragments using blood samples, as an liquid biopsy alternative to traditional tissue biopsies.

The company raised one billion dollars in financing. Guardant360, a liquid biopsy product for cancer screening, was released in 2014. The test scans for circulating tumor DNA genes in patient blood samples. It was adopted by some oncologists, and to pair advanced cancer patients with clinical trial opportunities. The Food and Drug Administration granted Guardant360 the fast track status in 2018.

In 2017, a venture capital funding round raised $360 million. Guardant Health subsequently expanded into global operations. In January 2019, Guardant Health entered a partnership with pharmaceutical company AstraZeneca to develop companion diagnostics. That October, the company started ECLIPSE, a 10,000 patient colorectal cancer study to evaluate the effectiveness of blood tests in colorectal cancer screening.

Guardant's blood-based in vitro diagnostic test for detecting colorectal cancer, Shield, received FDA approval in July 2024.

== Personal life ==
Helmy Eltoukhy was born and raised in the San Francisco Bay Area. He is currently in the process of legally dissolving his marriage to Carson Eltoukhy.

In December 2024, Eltoukhy was announced as co-chairman of English football club Sheffield United alongside fellow American businessman Steve Rosen. The club was taken over by the consortium group COH Sports led by Eltoukhy and Rosen. In July 2026, former owner Prince Abdullah claimed he was owed £35m by COH Sports and issued a winding-up petition against the consortium which the owners did not contest. Rosen and Eltoukhy could face action from the Independent Football Regulator.

== Recognition ==
Eltoukhy was named to Time Magazine's inaugural 50 Most Influential People in Healthcare in 2018, Fortune's 40 under 40 in 2017, and the San Francisco Business Times 40 under 40 in 2019. He has served as an invited speaker or panelist at the World Economic Forum, Fortune Brainstorm Health 2017, and The Business of Personalized Medicine Summit 2018.
