= Musaad bin Khalid Al Saud =

Saudi prince and businessman (born 1993)

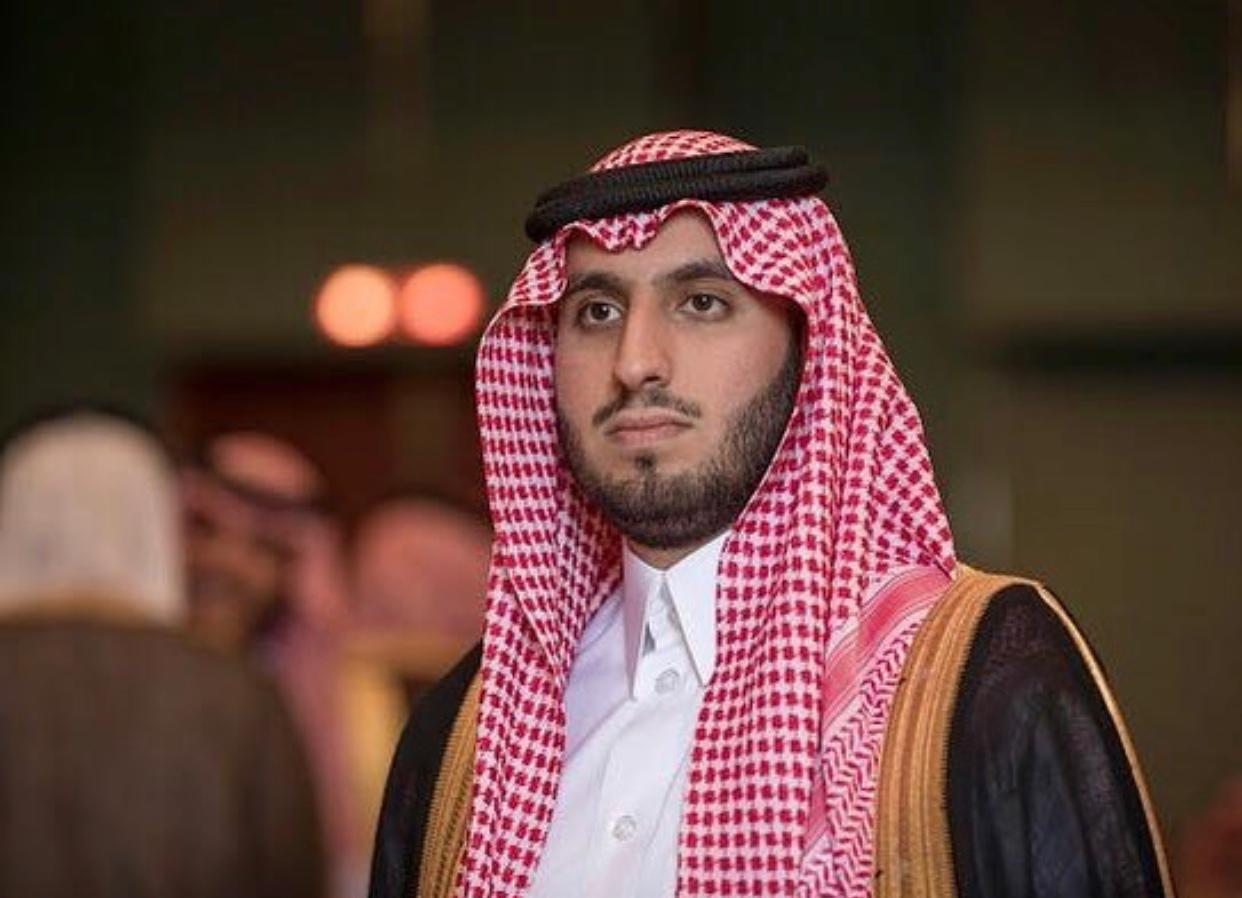
- Born: 20 January 1993 (age 33); Riyadh, Saudi Arabia
Names
- Musaʽad bin Khalid bin Musaʽad bin ʽAbdulrahman Al Saʽud
- House: House of Saud
- Father: Khalid bin Musaʽad bin ʽAbdulrahman Al Saʽud
- Mother: Abeer bint Faisal bin ʽAbdulrahman Al Sudairi

Musaʽad bin Khalid bin Musaʽad bin ʽAbdulrahman Al Saʽud (Arabic: مساعد بن خالد بن مساعد بن عبدالرحمن آل سعود) is a Saudi prince and businessman. He is the son of Prince Khalid Bin Musa’ad bin Abdulrahman Al Saud, a prominent Saudi businessman in real estate. His mother is Princess Abeer bint Faisal bin Abdulrahman bin Ahmad Al Sudairy.

== Early life and education ==
Musa’ad was born on 20 January 1993 in Riyadh, Saudi Arabia. His grandfather from his father's side is Prince Musa’ad bin Abdulrahman Al Saud, who served as the minister of interior and the minister of finance. He was the younger brother of King Abdulaziz bin Abdulrahman Al Saud, the founder of Saudi Arabia. His grandfather from his mother's side is Faisal bin Abdulrahman bin Ahmed Al Sudairi, former deputy governor of Al Jawf and former and first undersecretary of interior ministry for security affairs in the. Later he focused his career in business in the fields of construction, real estate, and farming.

Musa’ad holds a bachelor of science degree in business administration with a major in project management from Al Faisal University. He speaks Arabic, English, and Italian.

== Business activities and positions held ==
In 2010, Musa’ad established a leading football academy focusing on the development of youth players. It was also used as a training facility for other football teams in Riyadh, Saudi Arabia.

In 2015, Musa’ad was a member of the consultant team, Prince Abdullah Bin Musa’ad Bin Abdulaziz Al Saud had during his time as the President of the General Sports Authority in Saudi Arabia.

In 2016, Musa’ad joined Ernst & Young. He held three positions during his time there: Consultant, Senior Consultant in Strategy & Customer, and EY's Sport & Entertainment Sector Manager at EY MENA Advisory Services.

Musa’ad was the chairman of Sheffield United F.C. from 2019 to 2021 and is the director of K Beerschot VA.

He currently holds a 67% majority stake in Club Universidad de Chile, where his strategic vision focuses on consolidating the club's status among Latin America's elite teams. A key initiative under his management is the "Estadio Arena Azul" project, a megastructure involving an estimated investment of US$200 million, with construction planned between 2027 and 2031.

== Personal life ==
Musa’ad has four sisters; Princess Sarah, Princess Hala, Princess Munirah, and Princess Al Johara.

Musa’ad married to Princess Latifa bint Abdullah bin Musa’ad bin Abdulaziz Al Saud in 2015.
