= 2023–24 Stoke City F.C. season =

2023-24 season of Stoke City FC

Stoke City
2023–24 season
- Joint-Chairman: John Coates and Peter Coates
- Manager: Alex Neil (until 10 December); Steven Schumacher (from 19 December)
- Stadium: bet365 Stadium
- Championship: 17th
- FA Cup: Third round
- EFL Cup: Third round
- Top goalscorer: League: André Vidigal (6); All: André Vidigal (7)
- Highest home attendance: 28,243 v Bristol City (4 May 2024)
- Lowest home attendance: 18,555 v Swansea City (12 December 2023)
Home colours	Away colours	Third colours

The 2023–24 season was Stoke City's 107th season in the Football League, and the 47th in the second tier.

Stoke had a very busy summer transfer window bringing in 18 new players most of which were foreign players in a new recruitment strategy brought in by technical director Ricky Martin. Despite an opening day 4–1 win against Rotherham United it quickly became apparent that Stoke had assembled an unbalanced squad which struggled to score goals or keep clean sheets. Alex Neil was sacked in December after winning just six of the first 20 games and was replaced by Plymouth Argyle manager Steven Schumacher. Schumacher encountered discipline problems within the squad which resulted in Ricky Martin being sacked and after more poor results they ended February in the relegation zone. Six wins in the final 12 matches saw Stoke retain their Championship status, finishing in 17th position.

== Pre-season ==
Stoke announced their retained list on 10 May 2023 with Sam Clucas, Demeaco Duhaney, Aden Flint, Morgan Fox, Phil Jagielka, Tashan Oakley-Boothe and Nick Powell departing the club following the end of their contracts whilst Gabriel Adebambo, Jacob Holland-Wilkinson, Tommy Jackson, George Lewis, Dan Malone, Luke Redfern, Josh Roney and Douglas James-Taylor departed from the under-21 team. Goalkeepers Jack Bonham, Frank Fielding and Blondy Nna Noukeu all signed one-year contract extensions. First-team coach John O'Shea left the club on 12 May 2023 to focus on his Republic of Ireland FA role. Under-21s manager Kevin Russell and under-18s manager Richard Walker both departed the club after working with the academy for over a decade. Crewe Alexandra assistant manager Alex Morris was appointed under-21 head coach. Ryan Shawcross returned to the club as academy coach and Jared Dublin was appointed Head of Recruitment. Former loanee Paul Gallagher joined the club from Preston as first-team coach.

Enda Stevens was the first signing of the summer on 5 July, joining after his release from Sheffield United. Ben Pearson returned on a permanent four-year deal from AFC Bournemouth. Free agents Michael Rose and Daniel Johnson arrived on free transfers. Ki-Jana Hoever returned on loan from Wolves along with Portuguese winger Chiquinho. A second Portuguese winger, André Vidigal arrived from Marítimo for an undisclosed fee. Goalkeeper Mark Travers joined on a season-long loan from AFC Bournemouth. On 28 July, two strikers signed, Brazilian Wesley from Aston Villa and Moroccan Ryan Mmaee from Hungarian side Ferencváros.

Stoke began their pre-season schedule with a trip to Notts County and came away with a comfortable 5–1 victory with Tyrese Campbell getting a first-half hat-trick. The squad then spent a week at a training camp in Benidorm, Spain ending with a 1–1 draw against Segunda División side Levante. Stoke lost 3–0 at Derby County on 22 July in what was a testimonial for Derby's Craig Forsyth. City beat Burton Albion 1–0 to win the Bass Charity Vase, Jacob Brown scoring the only goal. Stoke ended pre-season with a 1–0 home defeat against Everton, Amadou Onana scoring with the last kick of the match.

8 July 2023 Friendly	Notts County	1–5	Stoke City	Nottingham
15:00 BST	Langstaff 41'	Report	Sparrow 16'; Campbell 20', 37', 43'; Wright-Phillips 60'	Stadium: Meadow Lane; Attendance: 4,267 (1,352 away)

15 July 2023 Friendly	Levante	1–1	Stoke City	La Nucia, Alicante
18:00 CEST	Cantero 23'	Report	Campbell 62'	Stadium: Estadi Olímpic Camilo Cano

22 July 2023 Craig Forsyth Testimonial	Derby County	3–0	Stoke City	Derby
15:00 BST	Nelson 19'; Collins 26'; Mendez-Laing 41'	Report		Stadium: Pride Park; Attendance: 9,119

25 July 2023 Bass Charity Vase	Burton Albion	0–1	Stoke City	Burton-on-Trent
17:45 BST		Report	Brown 54'	Stadium: Pirelli Stadium; Attendance: 2,295

29 July 2023 Friendly	Stoke City	0–1	Everton	Stoke-on-Trent
15:00 BST		Report	Onana 90+5'	Stadium: bet365 Stadium

== Championship ==
=== August ===
Stoke began the 2023–24 season at home to Rotherham United with Alex Neil giving starts to eight of his new signings. First-half goals from Ki-Jana Hoever and a brace from new winger André Vidigal saw Stoke 3–0 up at half time. Lee Peltier pulled one back for the Millers but their hopes of a comeback were ended when Cafú was sent-off for two bookable offences. Jacob Brown made it 4–1 in the 90th minute. Brown was then sold to newly promoted Premier League side Luton Town. The first away match of the campaign ended in a 2–0 defeat against newly promoted Ipswich Town. They then beat Watford 1–0 with Vidigal scoring in the 53rd minute with a half-volley. Stoke continued their foreign recruitment bringing in Algerian forward Mehdi Léris, Dutch midfielder Wouter Burger Serbian winger Nikola Jojić and South Korean midfielder Bae Jun-ho. Stoke lost 1–0 to Millwall on 26 August, Kevin Nisbet scoring the only goal.

=== September ===
On transfer deadline day Stoke brought in American defender Lynden Gooch from Sunderland, winger Sead Hakšabanović on loan from Celtic, and young prospect Junior Tchamadeu from Colchester United whilst Josh Tymon left for Swansea City. A tight game against Preston North End was settled by a Will Keane brace early in the second half with his first being a controversial penalty. Stoke were defeated for a third game in row following the international break, losing 1–0 at Norwich City. Stoke's poor start to the season continued with a 2–2 draw away at Huddersfield Town and a 3–1 loss at home to Hull City. Stoke looked to heading towards another defeat after going 2–0 down at Bristol City but fought back with goals from Léris and Hakšabanović before academy graduate Nathan Lowe scored a 90th-minute winner.

=== October ===
Stoke faced relegated sides Southampton and Leicester City at the beginning of October, losing both 1–0 and 2–0 respectively to leave the team just above the relegation zone before the international break. Alex Neil faced his former club Sunderland following on 21 October. Ryan Mmaee gave Stoke an early lead but Sunderland equalised soon after through former loanee Jack Clarke. Stoke regained the lead straight after half-time with Luke McNally scoring his first goal for the club, and City held on to claim the win. Against Leeds United, with the match goalless after 75 minutes Patrick Bamford missed a penalty and Stoke went on to win the game after Wesley's header hit the crossbar and went in off Whites defender, Pascal Struijk. Prior to the Middlesbrough match Stoke suffered a blow as Bournemouth had an exceptional circumstances recall request for Mark Travers approved by the Premier League. Jack Bonham returned in goal as Stoke won 2–0 with goals from Michael Rose and Mehdi Léris in what was only their second win at the Riverside Stadium.

=== November ===
Stoke made it five games unbeaten with back-to-back goalless draws against Cardiff City and Coventry City. After the final international break of the year Stoke were well beaten 3–0 at home by Blackburn. The team put in an ill-disciplined performance away at Queens Park Rangers picking up seven yellow cards with Enda Stevens being sent-off for two bookable offences, Stoke did lead 2–1 but went on to lose 4–2.

=== December ===
Stoke lost again conceding in the final moments against Plymouth Argyle to lose 2–1 which increased the pressure on Alex Neil. City suffered another late defeat this time against bottom of the table Sheffield Wednesday, which prompted an angry reaction from supporters. Alex Neil was sacked the following day along with his assistant Martin Canning. Paul Gallagher took caretaker charge of the team against Swansea City where a late header from Harry Darling cancelled out Daniel Johnson's penalty. Stoke gained a hard-fought point away at promotion chasing West Bromwich Albion on 17 December. On 19 December Stoke appointed Plymouth Argyle manager Steven Schumacher as the team's new head coach along with Mark Hughes as his assistant, First Team Coach Peter Cavanagh and Goalkeeper Coach Darren Behcet. Schumacher's first game in charge saw Stoke play out a goalless draw with Millwall. He got his first win on boxing day at Wayne Rooney's Birmingham City, Gooch, Thompson Vidigal earning Stoke a 3–1 win and their first at St Andrew's since 1988. Stoke ended 2023 with a 1–1 draw away at Watford who were reduced to ten-men early in the second half after Vakoun Bayo was sent-off for lashing out at McNally.

=== January ===
Stoke began 2024 with another goalless home draw this time against promotion-chasing Ipswich Town this after Jordan Thompson was sent-off in the second half for dissent. City then earned a first victory at Rotherham United's New York Stadium with Lewis Baker scoring a long-range free-kick just before half-time. This was then followed by a 2–1 defeat against Birmingham City with a goal coming from Jordan Thompson and a 3–1 loss at Sunderland with an own goal coming from Jenson Seelt. In the January transfer window Stoke brought in goalkeeper Daniel Iversen, midfielder Luke Cundle and forwards Niall Ennis and Million Manhoef whilst Tommy Simkin, Emre Tezgel, D'Margio Wright-Phillips left on loans and Dwight Gayle had his contract terminated early.

=== February ===
Stoke were easily beaten at home by top of the table Leicester City 5–0. City lost a fourth match in a row, 3–1 at Blackburn Rovers prompting an angry reaction from the large travelling support shouting "Your not fit to wear the shirt!" The team managed to gain a vital 1–0 against relegation rivals Queens Park Rangers on 14 February with a goal from Wouter Burger, but lost 1–0 again three days later to Coventry City. Technical director Ricky Martin was sacked by John Coates and replaced by Jonathan Walters on an interim basis. Stoke dropped into the relegation zone for the first time this season with a 2–1 defeat at Cardiff City with a goal coming from Bae Jun-ho.

=== March ===
Walters issued a rallying call to supporters ahead of the final 12 games of the season. It had the desired effect as Stoke beat Middlesbrough 2–0 with goals from Bae Jun-ho and Lewis Baker, however results elsewhere meant Stoke remained in the bottom three. Three days later Stoke lost 1–0 at promotion chasing Leeds United and had Ben Pearson sent-off late on for two bookable offences. On 5 March Stoke announced plans to move the away section at the bet365 stadium and install safe standing. They then secured a late 2–1 victory against Preston North End to move up to 19th with an own goal coming from Andrew Hughes and a tap in by Luke Mcnally. They were easily beaten 3–0 by Norwich city a week later. After the international break Stoke beat Hull City 2–0 on Good Friday with goals from Josh Laurent and Ki-Jana Hoever to move five points clear of the relegation zone.

=== April ===
On Easter Monday Stoke drew 1–1 with relegation rivals Huddersfield Town, with Ki-Jana Hoever curling in a shot on 50 minutes, cancelling out Bojan Radulović's opener. Stoke then took on midlands rivals West Bromwich Albion on 7 April. The Baggies went 2–0 up through Mikey Johnston and Jed Wallace before Million Manhoef scored his first goal for the club and Vidigal fired in the rebound after his penalty was saved by Alex Palmer to earn Stoke a 2–2 draw. Stoke put in an abject performance away at Swansea, losing 3–0. The Potters then faced another relegation rival, Sheffield Wednesday at Hillsborough. Liam Palmer gave Wednesday the lead before Luke Cundle came off the bench to level the scores. Stoke secured a vital 3–0 win against Schumacher's former team Plymouth Argyle with goals from Burger, Hoever and Manhoef. The Potters secured their Championship status for the 2024–25 season with a 1–0 victory against play-off bound Southampton, Tyrese Campbell scoring the only goal.

=== May ===
Stoke ended the 2023–24 campaign with a comfortable 4–0 victory over Bristol City with goals from Campbell, Cundle and a brace from Manhoef.

=== Results ===
5 August 2023 1	Stoke City	4–1	Rotherham United	Stoke-on-Trent
15:00 BST	Hoever 5'; Vidigal 45+3', 45+8'; Brown 90'	Report	Peltier 46'	Stadium: bet365 Stadium; Attendance: 22,601; Referee: John Busby

12 August 2023 2	Ipswich Town	2–0	Stoke City	Ipswich
15:00 BST	Woolfenden 23'; Jackson 81'	Report		Stadium: Portman Road; Attendance: 29,006; Referee: Josh Smith

19 August 2023 3	Stoke City	1–0	Watford	Stoke-on-Trent
15:00 BST	Vidigal 53'	Report		Stadium: bet365 Stadium; Attendance: 21,193; Referee: James Bell

26 August 2023 4	Millwall	1–0	Stoke City	Bermondsey, London
15:00 BST	Nisbet 38'	Report		Stadium: The Den; Attendance: 15,254; Referee: David Webb

2 September 2023 5	Stoke City	0–2	Preston North End	Stoke-on-Trent
15:00 BST		Report	Keane 51' (pen.), 57'	Stadium: bet365 Stadium; Attendance: 22,957; Referee: Matt Donohue

16 September 2023 6	Norwich City	1–0	Stoke City	Norwich
15:00 BST	Stacey 44'	Report		Stadium: Carrow Road; Attendance: 25,816; Referee: Oliver Langford

20 September 2023 7	Huddersfield Town	2–2	Stoke City	Huddersfield
19:45 BST	Pearson 31'; Rudoni 68'	Report	Johnson 33'; Wilmot 62'	Stadium: Kirklees Stadium; Attendance: 18,791; Referee: Darren Bond

24 September 2023 8	Stoke City	1–3	Hull City	Stoke-on-Trent
12:00 BST	Vidigal 77'	Report	Connolly 30'; Traoré 32'; Slater 73'	Stadium: bet365 Stadium; Attendance: 21,142; Referee: Thomas Bramall

30 September 2023 9	Bristol City	2–3	Stoke City	Bristol
15:00 BST	Bell 5'; Wells 15'	Report	Léris 20'; Hakšabanović 47'; Lowe 89'	Stadium: Ashton Gate; Attendance: 21,117; Referee: Jeremy Simpson

3 October 2023 10	Stoke City	0–1	Southampton	Stoke-on-Trent
19:45 BST		Report	S. Armstrong 41'	Stadium: bet365 Stadium; Attendance: 20,002; Referee: James Bell

7 October 2023 11	Leicester City	2–0	Stoke City	Leicester
15:00 BST	Iheanacho 24'; Vardy 79'	Report		Stadium: King Power Stadium; Attendance: 31,589; Referee: Geoff Eltringham

21 October 2023 12	Stoke City	2–1	Sunderland	Stoke-on-Trent
15:00 BST	Mmaee 7'; McNally 47'	Report	Clarke 10'	Stadium: bet365 Stadium; Attendance: 25,512; Referee: Graham Scott

25 October 2023 13	Stoke City	1–0	Leeds United	Stoke-on-Trent
19:45 BST	Struijk 80' (o.g.)	Report		Stadium: bet365 Stadium; Attendance: 25,871; Referee: Paul Tierney

28 October 2023 14	Middlesbrough	0–2	Stoke City	Middlesbrough
15:00 BST		Report	Rose 8'; Léris 37'	Stadium: Riverside Stadium; Attendance: 26,732; Referee: Andrew Kitchen

4 November 2023 15	Stoke City	0–0	Cardiff City	Stoke-on-Trent
15:00 GMT		Report		Stadium: bet365 Stadium; Attendance: 23,089; Referee: Oliver Langford

11 November 2023 16	Coventry City	0–0	Stoke City	Coventry
15:00 GMT		Report		Stadium: Coventry Building Society Arena; Attendance: Anthony Backhouse; Referee: 25,003

25 November 2023 17	Stoke City	0–3	Blackburn Rovers	Stoke-on-Trent
15:00 GMT		Report	S. Wharton 4'; Moran 86'; Szmodics 90+1'	Stadium: bet365 Stadium; Attendance: 22,652; Referee: Andrew Kitchen

28 November 2023 18	Queens Park Rangers	4–2	Stoke City	Shepherd's Bush, London
19:45 GMT	Dykes 11' (pen.), 79'; Pearson 89' (o.g.); Willock 90+4'	Report	Mmaee 45'; Burger 59'	Stadium: Loftus Road; Attendance: 16,901; Referee: James Linington

2 December 2023 19	Plymouth Argyle	2–1	Stoke City	Plymouth
15:00 GMT	Bundu 43'; Randell 90+7'	Report	Campbell 23'	Stadium: Home Park; Attendance: 16,371; Referee: Sam Barrott

9 December 2023 20	Stoke City	0–1	Sheffield Wednesday	Stoke-on-Trent
15:00 GMT		Report	Musaba 90+1'	Stadium: bet365 Stadium; Attendance: 22,347; Referee: David Coote

12 December 2023 21	Stoke City	1–1	Swansea City	Stoke-on-Trent
19:45 GMT	Johnson 70' (pen.)	Report	Darling 89'	Stadium: bet365 Stadium; Attendance: 18,555; Referee: David Webb

17 December 2023 22	West Bromwich Albion	1–1	Stoke City	West Bromwich
12:00 GMT	Thomas-Asante 35'	Report	Gooch 12'	Stadium: The Hawthorns; Attendance: 23,298; Referee: Andrew Kitchen

23 December 2023 23	Stoke City	0–0	Millwall	Stoke-on-Trent
15:00 GMT		Report		Stadium: bet365 Stadium; Attendance: 21,409; Referee: Geoff Eltringham

26 December 2023 24	Birmingham City	1–3	Stoke City	Birmingham
17:15 GMT	Stansfield 69'	Report	Thompson 12'; Gooch 31'; Vidigal 53'	Stadium: St Andrew's; Attendance: 21,640; Referee: Robert Madley

29 December 2023 25	Watford	1–1	Stoke City	Watford
19:45 GMT	Livermore 15'	Report	Mmaee 34'	Stadium: Vicarage Road; Attendance: 19,643; Referee: Scott Oldham

1 January 2024 26	Stoke City	0–0	Ipswich Town	Stoke-on-Trent
15: GMT		Report		Stadium: bet365 Stadium; Attendance: 23,121; Referee: James Bell

13 January 2024 27	Rotherham United	0–1	Stoke City	Rotherham
15:00 GMT		Report	Baker 45+4'	Stadium: New York Stadium; Attendance: 11,002; Referee: Keith Stroud

20 January 2024 28	Stoke City	1–2	Birmingham City	Stoke-on-Trent
15:00 GMT	Thompson 70'	Report	Stansfield 10'; Bacuna 49'	Stadium: bet365 Stadium; Attendance: 25,058; Referee: Sam Barrott

27 January 2024 29	Sunderland	3–1	Stoke City	Sunderland
15:00 GMT	Burstow 43'; Ba 49'; Ekwah 70'	Report	Seelt 74' (o.g.)	Stadium: Stadium of Light; Attendance: 41,394; Referee: Andy Davies

3 February 2024 30	Stoke City	0–5	Leicester City	Stoke-on-Trent
15:00 GMT		Report	Daka 27', 66' (pen.); McAteer 30'; Vardy 73', 90+8' (pen.)	Stadium: bet365 Stadium; Attendance: 22,657; Referee: Lewis Smith

10 February 2024 31	Blackburn Rovers	3–1	Stoke City	Blackburn
15:00 GMT	Dolan 7', 37'; Szmodics 20'	Report	Ennis 39'	Stadium: Ewood Park; Attendance: 15,104; Referee: Gavin Ward

14 February 2024 32	Stoke City	1–0	Queens Park Rangers	Stoke-on-Trent
19:45 GMT	Burger 45'	Report		Stadium: bet365 Stadium; Attendance: 19,307; Referee: Andrew Kitchen

17 February 2024 33	Stoke City	0–1	Coventry City	Stoke-on-Trent
15:00 GMT		Report	Simms 51'	Stadium: bet365 Stadium; Attendance: 22,866; Referee: James Bell

24 February 2024 34	Cardiff City	2–1	Stoke City	Cardiff
15:00 GMT	Etete 5'; Grant 32'	Report	Bae Jun-ho 41'	Stadium: Cardiff City Stadium; Referee: Anthony Backhouse

2 March 2024 35	Stoke City	2–0	Middlesbrough	Stoke-on-Trent
15:00 GMT	Bae Jun-ho 40'; Baker 71'	Report		Stadium: bet365 Stadium; Attendance: John Busby; Referee: 21,673

5 March 2024 36	Leeds United	1–0	Stoke City	Leeds
19:45 GMT	James 33'	Report		Stadium: Elland Road; Attendance: 36,118; Referee: Oliver Langford

9 March 2024 37	Preston North End	1–2	Stoke City	Preston
15:00 GMT	Osmajić 68'	Report	Hughes 64' (o.g.); McNally 87'	Stadium: Deepdale; Attendance: 17,253; Referee: Josh Smith

16 March 2024 38	Stoke City	0–3	Norwich City	Stoke-on-Trent
15:00 GMT		Report	Sargent 24'; Sara 28'; Barnes 60'	Stadium: bet365 Stadium; Attendance: 21,887; Referee: Gavin Ward

29 March 2024 39	Hull City	0–2	Stoke City	Kingston upon Hull
15:00 GMT		Report	Laurent 69'; Hoever 90+3'	Stadium: MKM Stadium; Attendance: 24,601; Referee: Graham Scott

1 April 2024 40	Stoke City	1–1	Huddersfield Town	Stoke-on-Trent
15:00 BST	Hoever 50'	Report	Radulović 45'	Stadium: bet365 Stadium; Attendance: 23,917; Referee: Rebecca Welch

6 April 2024 41	Stoke City	2–2	West Bromwich Albion	Stoke-on-Trent
15:00 BST	Manhoef 68'; Vidigal 78'	Report	Johnston 24'; Wallace 57'	Stadium: bet365 Stadium; Attendance: 22,339; Referee: Andrew Kitchen

10 April 2024 42	Swansea City	3–0	Stoke City	Swansea
20:00 BST	Cullen 19'; Grimes 53' (pen.); Key 73'	Report		Stadium: Swansea.com Stadium; Attendance: 14,692; Referee: Keith Stroud

13 April 2024 43	Sheffield Wednesday	1–1	Stoke City	Sheffield
15:00 BST	Palmer 68'	Report	Cundle 76'	Stadium: Hillsborough; Attendance: 32,041; Referee: Stephen Martin

20 April 2024 44	Stoke City	3–0	Plymouth Argyle	Stoke-on-Trent
15:00 BST	Hoever 43'; Manhoef 45+2'; Burger 90+3'	Report		Stadium: bet365 Stadium; Attendance: 24,674; Referee: Bobby Madley

27 April 2024 45	Southampton	0–1	Stoke City	Southampton
15:00 BST		Report	Campbell 36'	Stadium: St Mary's Stadium; Attendance: 30,584; Referee: David Webb

4 May 2024 46	Stoke City	4–0	Bristol City	Stoke-on-Trent
12:30 BST	Cundle 25'; Campbell 45'; Manhoef 45+2', 49'	Report		Stadium: bet365 Stadium; Attendance: 28,243; Referee: Sam Barrott

=== League table ===
Pos	Team	Pld	W	D	L	GF	GA	GD	Pts
14	Swansea City	46	15	12	19	59	65	−6	57
15	Watford	46	13	17	16	61	61	0	56
16	Sunderland	46	16	8	22	52	54	−2	56
17	Stoke City	46	15	11	20	49	60	−11	56
18	Queens Park Rangers	46	15	11	20	47	58	−11	56
19	Blackburn Rovers	46	14	11	21	60	74	−14	53
20	Sheffield Wednesday	46	15	8	23	44	68	−24	53

Source: EFL official website
Rules for classification: 1) Points; 2) Goal difference; 3) Number of goals scored; 4) Head-to-head results; 5) Wins; 6) Away goals; 7) Penalty points (sec 9.5); 8) Number of 12-point sending off offences; 9) Play-off (only if needed to determine promotion/relegation)

=== Results by round ===
Round	1	2	3	4	5	6	7	8	9	10	11	12	13	14	15	16	17	18	19	20	21	22	23	24	25	26	27	28	29	30	31	32	33	34	35	36	37	38	39	40	41	42	43	44	45	46
Ground	H	A	H	A	H	A	A	H	A	H	A	H	H	A	H	A	H	A	A	H	H	A	H	A	A	H	A	H	A	H	A	H	H	A	H	A	A	H	A	H	H	A	A	H	A	H
Result	W	L	W	L	L	L	D	L	W	L	L	W	W	W	D	D	L	L	L	L	D	D	D	W	D	D	W	L	L	L	L	W	L	L	W	L	W	L	W	D	D	L	D	W	W	W
Position	2	13	8	10	16	19	19	20	16	18	21	20	17	11	13	14	16	17	20	20	19	19	19	18	19	19	17	19	19	20	20	19	19	22	22	22	19	19	17	18	18	19	20	17	18	17

Updated to match(es) played on 1 April 2024. Source: Soccerway
A = Away; H = Home; W = Win; D = Draw; L = Loss; P = Postponed

== FA Cup ==
As a Championship side, Stoke entered the competition in the third round and were drawn at home to Brighton & Hove Albion.

6 January 2024 Third Round	Stoke City	2–4	Brighton & Hove Albion	Stoke-on-Trent
15:00 GMT	van Hecke 16' (o.g.); Baker 63' (pen.)	Report	Estupiñán 45+6'; Dunk 52'; João Pedro 71', 80'	Stadium: bet365 Stadium; Attendance: 17,032; Referee: Paul Tierney

== EFL Cup ==
Stoke were drawn at home to West Bromwich Albion in the first round, winning 2–1 after an own goal by Albion keeper, Josh Griffiths and a winning goal from André Vidigal just after Brandon Thomas-Asante had equalised. Stoke progressed past Rotherham United in the second round, winning 6–1 with Wouter Burger, Mehdi Léris and Ryan Mmaee scoring their first goals for the club. Stoke were eliminated by Premier League side Bournemouth in the third round.

8 August 2023 First Round	Stoke City	2–1	West Bromwich Albion	Stoke-on-Trent
19:45 BST	Griffiths 27' (o.g.); Vidigal 65'	Report	Thomas-Asante 64'	Stadium: bet365 Stadium; Attendance: 10,583; Referee: Geoff Eltringham

29 August 2023 Second Round	Stoke City	6–1	Rotherham United	Stoke-on-Trent
19:45 BST	Burger 2'; Mmaee 18'; Laurent 29', 55'; Campbell 43'; Léris 72'	Report	Morrison 22'	Stadium: bet365 Stadium; Attendance: 9,410; Referee: Michael Salisbury

27 September 2023 Third Round	Bournemouth	2–0	Stoke City	Bournemouth
19:45 BST	Solanke 51'; Rothwell 54'	Report		Stadium: Dean Court; Attendance: 10,282; Referee: Graham Scott

== Squad statistics ==
No.	Pos.	Name	Championship		FA Cup		EFL Cup		Total		Discipline	
No.	Pos.	Name	Apps	Goals	Apps	Goals	Apps	Goals	Apps	Goals	Yellow card	Red card
1	GK	(Republic of Ireland) Mark Travers	13	0	0	0	1	0	14	0	1	0
1	GK	(Denmark) Daniel Iversen	18	0	1	0	0	0	19	0	0	0
2	DF	(United States) Lynden Gooch	19(10)	2	0	0	1	0	20(10)	2	3	0
3	DF	(Republic of Ireland) Enda Stevens	18(3)	0	0	0	0	0	19(3)	0	7	1
4	MF	(England) Ben Pearson	22(7)	0	0	0	2(1)	0	24(8)	0	12	1
5	DF	(Scotland) Michael Rose	35(2)	1	1	0	2(1)	0	37(3)	1	6	0
6	MF	(Netherlands) Wouter Burger	31(8)	3	1	0	1	1	33(8)	4	11	0
7	MF	(Portugal) André Vidigal	18(11)	6	0(1)	0	0(1)	1	18(13)	7	2	0
8	MF	(England) Lewis Baker	12(8)	2	1	1	0	0	13(8)	3	3	0
9	FW	(Scotland) Jacob Brown	1	1	0	0	0	0	1	1	1	0
10	FW	(England) Tyrese Campbell	14(9)	3	0	0	1	1	15(9)	4	3	0
11	FW	(England) Dwight Gayle	4(5)	0	0	0	0(3)	0	4(8)	0	0	0
12	MF	(Jamaica) Daniel Johnson	19(7)	2	1	0	1(1)	0	21(8)	2	5	0
13	GK	(Republic of Ireland) Jack Bonham	14	0	0	0	2	0	16	0	0	0
14	DF	(England) Josh Tymon	1(1)	0	0	0	2	0	3(1)	0	0	0
14	FW	(England) Niall Ennis	7(7)	1	0	0	0	0	7(7)	1	1	0
15	MF	(Northern Ireland) Jordan Thompson	23(9)	2	0	0	2(1)	0	25(10)	2	13	1
16	DF	(England) Ben Wilmot	23(2)	1	1	0	3	0	27(2)	1	9	0
17	DF	(Netherlands) Ki-Jana Hoever	35(5)	4	1	0	3	0	39(5)	4	5	0
18	FW	(Brazil) Wesley	5(15)	0	1	0	2	0	8(15)	0	1	0
19	FW	(Morocco) Ryan Mmaee	17(7)	3	0(1)	0	2	1	19(8)	4	1	0
20	MF	(Portugal) Chiquinho	1(2)	0	0	0	1	0	2(2)	0	0	0
20	FW	(Montenegro) Sead Hakšabanović	11(8)	1	1	0	0	0	12(8)	1	1	0
21	MF	(Serbia) Nikola Jojić	0(1)	0	0	0	0(2)	0	0(3)	0	0	0
22	MF	(South Korea) Bae Jun-ho	25(13)	2	1	0	1	0	27(13)	2	3	0
23	DF	(Republic of Ireland) Luke McNally	36(2)	2	0(1)	0	1(1)	0	37(4)	2	8	0
24	DF	(Cameroon) Junior Tchamadeu	9(6)	0	0	0	0	0	9(6)	0	4	0
25	MF	(England) Luke Cundle	11(5)	2	0	0	0	0	11(5)	2	2	0
26	DF	(Republic of Ireland) Ciaran Clark	3	0	0	0	0	0	3	0	1	0
27	MF	(Algeria) Mehdi Léris	18(12)	2	1	0	2	1	21(12)	3	5	0
28	MF	(England) Josh Laurent	30(7)	1	0	0	2(1)	2	32(8)	3	8	0
29	MF	(England) D'Margio Wright-Phillips	0	0	0	0	0	0	0	0	0	0
30	MF	(England) Sol Sidibe	0(4)	0	0(1)	0	1(2)	0	1(7)	0	1	0
34	GK	(England) Frank Fielding	0	0	0	0	0	0	0	0	0	0
35	FW	(England) Nathan Lowe	3(10)	1	0(1)	0	0(1)	0	3(12)	1	0	0
38	MF	(Scotland) Liam McCarron	0	0	0(1)	0	0	0	0(1)	0	0	0
42	FW	(Netherlands) Million Manhoef	9(5)	4	0	0	0	0	9(5)	4	2	0
45	GK	(England) Tommy Simkin	1	0	0	0	0	0	1	0	0	0
Own goals			—	3	—	1	—	1	—	5	—	

== Transfers ==
=== In ===
Date	Pos.	Name	From	Fee	Ref.
5 July 2023	DF	(Republic of Ireland) Enda Stevens	(England) Sheffield United	Free Transfer	
8 July 2023	MF	(England) Ben Pearson	(England) Bournemouth	Undisclosed	
17 July 2023	DF	(Scotland) Michael Rose	(England) Coventry City	Free Transfer	
19 July 2023	MF	(Jamaica) Daniel Johnson	(England) Preston North End	Free Transfer	
24 July 2023	MF	(Portugal) André Vidigal	(Portugal) Marítimo	Undisclosed	
28 July 2023	FW	(Brazil) Wesley	(England) Aston Villa	Undisclosed	
28 July 2023	FW	(Morocco) Ryan Mmaee	(Hungary) Ferencváros	Undisclosed	
22 August 2023	MF	(Serbia) Nikola Jojić	(Serbia) Mladost Lučani	Undisclosed	
22 August 2023	MF	(Algeria) Mehdi Léris	(Italy) Sampdoria	Undisclosed	
25 August 2023	MF	(Netherlands) Wouter Burger	(Switzerland) FC Basel	Undisclosed	
31 August 2023	MF	(South Korea) Bae Jun-ho	(South Korea) Daejeon Hana Citizen	Undisclosed	
1 September 2023	MF	(United States) Lynden Gooch	(England) Sunderland	Undisclosed	
1 September 2023	DF	(Cameroon) Junior Tchamadeu	(England) Colchester United	Undisclosed	
10 October 2023	DF	(Republic of Ireland) Ciaran Clark	Free agent	Free	
16 January 2024	GK	(New Zealand) Scott Morris	(New Zealand) Christchurch United	Undisclosed	
26 January 2024	MF	(Republic of Ireland) Darius Lipsiuc	(Republic of Ireland) St Patrick's Athletic	Undisclosed	
1 February 2024	FW	(Netherlands) Million Manhoef	(Netherlands) Vitesse	Undisclosed	
1 February 2024	FW	(England) Niall Ennis	(England) Blackburn Rovers	Undisclosed	

=== Out ===
Date	Pos.	Name	To	Fee	Ref.
30 June 2023	MF	(Republic of Ireland) Gabriel Adebambo	Unattached	Released	
30 June 2023	MF	(England) Sam Clucas	(England) Rotherham United	Released	
30 June 2023	DF	(England) Demeaco Duhaney	(Turkey) İstanbulspor	Released	
30 June 2023	DF	(England) Aden Flint	(England) Mansfield Town	Released	
30 June 2023	DF	(Wales) Morgan Fox	(England) Queens Park Rangers	Released	
30 June 2023	FW	(England) Jacob Holland-Wilkinson	Unattached	Released	
30 June 2023	GK	(England) Tommy Jackson	Unattached	Released	
30 June 2023	DF	(England) Phil Jagielka	Retired		
30 June 2023	FW	(England) Douglas James-Taylor	(England) Walsall	Released	
30 June 2023	DF	(England) George Lewis	(England) Leek Town	Released	
30 June 2023	MF	(Wales) Dan Malone	Unattached	Released	
30 June 2023	DF	(England) Taylor McMahon	(England) Stockport County	Free transfer	
30 June 2023	MF	(England) Tashan Oakley-Boothe	(England) Blackpool	Released	
30 June 2023	MF	(England) Nick Powell	(England) Stockport County	Released	
30 June 2023	DF	(England) Luke Redfern	(England) Halesowen Town	Released	
30 June 2023	DF	(Northern Ireland) Josh Roney	Unattached	Released	
3 August 2023	DF	(England) Connor Taylor	(England) Bristol Rovers	Undisclosed	
10 August 2023	FW	(Scotland) Jacob Brown	(England) Luton Town	Undisclosed	
1 September 2023	DF	(England) Josh Tymon	(Wales) Swansea City	Undisclosed	
29 September 2023	FW	(England) Justin Iwobi	(England) FC Halifax Town	Free transfer	
15 December 2023	DF	(Scotland) Lewis Macari	(England) Notts County	Free transfer	
1 February 2024	FW	(England) Dwight Gayle	(England) Derby County	Contract terminated	

=== Loans in ===
Date from	Pos.	Name	From	Date to	Ref.
21 July 2023	DF	(Netherlands) Ki-Jana Hoever	(England) Wolverhampton Wanderers	End of Season	
22 July 2023	MF	(Portugal) Chiquinho	(England) Wolverhampton Wanderers	1 September 2023 (Note: On 1 September, Chiquinho was recalled to Wolverhampton Wanderers and loaned to Famalicão)	
27 July 2023	GK	(Republic of Ireland) Mark Travers	(England) AFC Bournemouth	27 October 2023 (Note: On 27 October, Travers was recalled by AFC Bournemouth)	
2 August 2023	DF	(Republic of Ireland) Luke McNally	(England) Burnley	End of Season	
1 September 2023	FW	(Montenegro) Sead Hakšabanović	(Scotland) Celtic	End of Season	
5 January 2024	GK	(Denmark) Daniel Iversen	(England) Leicester City	End of Season	
9 January 2024	MF	(England) Luke Cundle	(England) Wolverhampton Wanderers	End of Season	

=== Loans out ===
Date from	Pos.	Name	To	On loan until	Ref.
19 July 2023	GK	(England) Tommy Simkin	(England) Solihull Moors	10 November 2023 (Note: On 10 November, Simkin was recalled by Stoke.)	
27 July 2023	DF	(England) Tom Edwards	(England) Huddersfield Town	End of Season	
4 August 2023	MF	(England) Sonny Singh	(England) Hereford	18 October 2023 (Note: On 18 October, Singh returned from his loan at Hereford, earlier than planned.)	
9 August 2023	GK	(England) Alfie Brooks	(Wales) Colwyn Bay	End of Season	
1 September 2023	DF	(Wales) Matt Baker	(Wales) Newport County	End of Season	
1 September 2023	DF	(Scotland) Lewis Macari	(England) Notts County	1 January 2024	
1 September 2023	DF	(Republic of Ireland) David Okagbue	(England) Walsall	End of Season	
5 September 2023	MF	(Wales) Tom Sparrow	(England) Chester	28 November 2023	
21 November 2023	DF	(Jamaica) Luke Badley-Morgan	(England) Rushall Olympic	12 December 2023	
21 November 2023	MF	(England) Sonny Singh	(England) Rushall Olympic	12 December 2023	
12 January 2024	GK	(England) Tommy Simkin	(England) Forest Green Rovers	End of Season	
1 February 2024	FW	(England) Emre Tezgel	(England) Milton Keynes Dons	End of Season	
2 February 2024	FW	(New Zealand) Adam Watson	(England) Hanley Town	1 March 2024	
2 February 2024	FW	(England) D'Margio Wright-Phillips	(Belgium) Beerschot	End of Season	
