= 2022–23 Stoke City F.C. season =

Stoke City
2022–23 season
- Joint-Chairman: John Coates and Peter Coates
- Manager: Michael O'Neill (until 25 August); Dean Holden (interim) (until 27 August); Alex Neil (from 28 August)
- Stadium: bet365 Stadium
- Championship: 16th
- FA Cup: Fifth round
- EFL Cup: First round
- Top goalscorer: League: Tyrese Campbell (9); All: Jacob Brown; Tyrese Campbell (9 each)
- Highest home attendance: 23,970 v Hull City (11 February 2023)
- Lowest home attendance: 17,427 v Blackburn Rovers (10 March 2023)
Home colours	Away colours	Third colours

The 2022–23 season was Stoke City's 106th season in the Football League, and the 46th in the second tier.

In the summer of 2022, Stoke, restricted by Financial Fair Play brought in free transfers and loans. After a poor start one win in the opening five matches Michael O'Neill was sacked by the board and replaced by Sunderland manager Alex Neil. After beating Preston North End on 15 October, Stoke went on a run of three wins in 15 which saw them in danger of being involved in a relegation fight. High scoring victories over Blackburn Rovers, Coventry, Huddersfield Town, Reading, Sunderland and Swansea City pulled Stoke clear of trouble and into mid-table. Stoke's home form during the season was one the worst in the league with 12 defeats, 10 of which were by a single goal margin.

== Pre-season and friendlies ==
In February 2022 Stoke announced a five-year multi-million pound refurbishment programme for the bet365 Stadium and the Clayton Wood Training Ground beginning in the summer of 2022 with the replacement of 8,400 seats in the Franklyn Stand and regeneration of The Players' Lounge and Delilah’s Bar. Leaving the club in the transfer window were Benik Afobe, Joe Allen, James Chester, Alfie Doughty, Steven Fletcher, Tom Ince, Christian Norton, Tashan Oakley-Boothe, Tommy Smith and Mario Vrančić. Whilst coming into the team were Harry Clarke, Aden Flint, Dwight Gayle, Gavin Kilkenny, Josh Laurent, Liam McCarron and Will Smallbone.

The squad returned to Clayton Wood for pre-season training on 20 June and played a behind closed doors match against Leeds United on 2 July, they then spent a week at a training camp in Cork, Ireland. On 9 July Stoke beat League of Ireland First Division side Cork City 2–0 at Turners Cross. City then faced three League One teams, losing 2–0 to Accrington Stanley and Bristol Rovers whilst drawing 1–1 with Fleetwood Town. Stoke ended an unimpressive pre-season with a 2–1 defeat at Heart of Midlothian.

Date	Opponent	Venue	Result	Scorers	Report
9 July 2022	Cork City	A	2–0	Wright-Phillips 21', Brown 86'	Report
13 July 2022	Accrington Stanley	A	0–2		Report
16 July 2022	Fleetwood Town	H	1–1	Campbell 36'	Report
19 July 2022	Bristol Rovers	A	0–2		Report
23 July 2022	Heart of Midlothian	A	1–2	Campbell 90'	Report
2 December 2022	Nottingham Forest	N	2–1	Cook 65' (o.g.), Campbell 77'	Report

== Championship ==
=== July & August ===
Stoke lost their opening game 2–0 away at Millwall with both of the Lions' goals coming from unmarked Charlie Cresswell headers. The first home game of the season was won 2–0 against Blackpool with goals from Harry Clarke and Jacob Brown. After exiting the EFL Cup, City suffered a 3–1 defeat at Huddersfield Town with Lewis Baker missing a first half penalty. City were second-best against Middlesbrough and looked to be heading for a 2–1 defeat before a late header from D'Margio Wright-Phillips earned Stoke a fortunate 2–2 draw. Stoke's poor start to the season continued as they lost 1–0 at home to newly promoted Sunderland on 20 August. O'Neill was then sacked by the club four days later. The next day Stoke were given permission by Sunderland to speak to Alex Neil. Dean Holden took caretaker charge of the match against Blackburn Rovers as a long range goal from Baker earned Stoke their first away win of the season. On 28 August Alex Neil was appointed manager on a three-year contract. Neil's first match in charge was at home against Swansea City. Swansea took and early lead through Joël Piroe and after wasteful finishing Stoke finally equalised in stoppage time through Tyrese Campbell.

=== September ===
On transfer deadline day Stoke brought in right-back Dujon Sterling on a season-long loan from Chelsea. Stoke lost 2–1 at Reading with both the Royals goals coming from defensive errors. After the match Neil was critical of his sides lack of fitness. The team responded with a comfortable 3–0 victory at Hull City with a brace from Baker. They ended September with a goalless draw away at Queens Park Rangers.

=== October ===
After the international break Stoke were out-played by Watford, losing 4–0, their heaviest home defeat for five years. Three-days later a late header from Harry Clarke earned Stoke a 1–1 draw away at Burnley. Stoke then beat the early league leaders, Sheffield United 3–1 with goals from Wilmot, Phil Jagielka and a first professional league goal from Liam Delap. City put in a commanding away performance at Preston North End, winning 2–0 with goals from Campbell and Will Smallbone. They then lost 1–0 at home against Rotherham United despite having 29 shots at goal. Stoke lost to Coventry in a similar manner, controlling possession but failing to create any meaningful chances and were hit twice on the counter-attack. They ended October with a third straight defeat, going down 3–1 at Norwich.

=== November ===
Stoke beat Wigan Athletic 1–0 on 2 November, with a goal from Josh Tymon on his return from Injury. They then lost a third straight home match 2–1 against Birmingham. Three days later they ended that run with a 2–0 victory against Luton Town with early goals from Powell and an own goal from Tom Lockyer, The game also marked Harry Souttar's return from injury after a year out. Stoke put in a poor performance against West Brom, losing 2–0 before the season took a four week break due to the 2022 FIFA World Cup.

=== December ===
During the break Stoke went on a warm weather training camp in Dubai and played a friendly against Nottingham Forest at Loughborough University, winning 2–1. Stoke returned to Championship football on 10 December with a home match against Cardiff City. Ryan Wintle scored early on for the Bluebirds but two quick goals from Campbell and Delap put Stoke into a 2–1 lead but a late goal from Callum Robinson earned Cardiff a point. The following week Stoke came from behind to beat Bristol City 2–1 at Ashton Gate. On Boxing Day, Stoke came from behind twice to draw 2–2 with Rotherham United. Stoke ended 2022 with a home defeat against league leaders Burnley, Josh Cullen scoring the only goal.

=== January ===
Stoke began 2023 with a home clash against Preston North End. Ched Evans scored the only goal of a poor quality game in second half injury time. Neil decided to let first team coach and club legend Rory Delap leave the club and also ended the loan of his son Liam Delap. On 14 January, Joe Bursik joined Belgian side Club Brugge and later on Stoke went on to lose 3–1 to promotion chasing Sheffield United. Loanees Harry Clarke and Tariqe Fosu both returned to their parent clubs before Stoke ended a run of three successive defeats with an emphatic 4–0 win over Reading. Neil added more loan players to his squad, goalkeeper Matija Sarkic, defenders Ki-Jana Hoever and Axel Tuanzebe, midfielders Bersant Celina and Ben Pearson whilst Harry Souttar completed a £15 million move to Leicester City.

=== February ===
New signings Celina and Sarkic made their first league start away at in-form Luton Town as Pelly Ruddock Mpanzu scored the only goal of the game, this was followed by a drab goalless draw against Hull City. Stoke then took on bottom of the table Huddersfield Town, winning 3–0 with goals from Jagielka, Brown and late penalty from Baker whilst the Terriers had Will Boyle sent-off for two bookable offences. Stoke lost 1–0 to another bottom of the table side Blackpool, Ian Poveda scoring the only goal in the seventh minute. They made amends two-days later beating Swansea City 3–1 with Josh Laurent scoring his first goals for the club. Stoke ended February with 1–0 defeat against play-off chasing Millwall, Zian Flemming scoring the only goal early into the match.

=== March ===
Alex Neil made his first return to Sunderland on 4 March where he was given a hostile reception. His team won easily, beating the Black Cats 5–1 with a brace from both Campbell and Gayle. Next up were promotion chasing Blackburn Rovers and Stoke continued their goalscoring form with Ki-Jana Hoever scoring his first goals for the club and a strike from Campbell, putting the team into a 3–0 lead before late Rovers goals made a nervy finish but Stoke saw out a 3–2 victory. Four-days later Hoever scored again as Stoke came from behind to draw 1–1 at Middlesbrough. Stoke ended March with a frustrating goalless draw against Norwich City after they were denied by an inspired performance from former loanee goalkeeper Angus Gunn.

=== April ===
Following the international break Stoke produced one of the best performances of the season beating Coventry City 4–0 at the Coventry Building Society Arena with goals from Brown, Campbell, Hoever and Smallbone. On Good Friday Bristol City were the opposition and despite Powell giving Stoke a first half lead The Robins mounted a comeback winning 2–1 and then on Easter Monday Stoke played out a drab goalless draw away at Birmingham City. Stoke's poor home form continued with back-to-back defeats against West Bromwich Albion and Wigan Athletic. City drew 1–1 at Cardiff with Jack Bonham saving a penalty from Sory Kaba and lost a 11th home match of the campaign against Queens Park Rangers.

=== May ===
Stoke ended a forgettable campaign with a 2–0 defeat away at Watford to finish in 16th position.

=== Results ===
Match	Date	Opponent	Venue	Result	Attendance	Scorers	Report
1	30 July 2022	Millwall	A	0–2	15,341		Report
2	6 August 2022	Blackpool	H	2–0	23,612	Clarke 33', Brown 77'	Report
3	13 August 2022	Huddersfield Town	A	1–3	18,618	Baker 56'	Report
4	17 August 2022	Middlesbrough	H	2–2	18,345	Brown 19', Wright-Phillips 90+1'	Report
5	20 August 2022	Sunderland	H	0–1	21,230		Report
6	27 August 2022	Blackburn Rovers	A	1–0	13,371	Baker 27'	Report
7	31 August 2022	Swansea City	H	1–1	18,697	Campbell 90+1'	Report
8	4 September 2022	Reading	A	1–2	12,292	Wilmot 40'	Report
9	13 September 2022	Hull City	A	3–0	15,627	Baker (2) 25', 64', Wilmot 45'	Report
10	17 September 2022	Queens Park Rangers	A	0–0	14,174		Report
11	2 October 2022	Watford	H	0–4	19,905		Report
12	5 October 2022	Burnley	A	1–1	18,131	Clarke 87'	Report
13	8 October 2022	Sheffield United	H	3–1	22,008	Wilmot 4', Jagielka 45+4', Delap 90+1'	Report
14	15 October 2022	Preston North End	A	2–0	17,498	Smallbone 58', Campbell 66'	Report
15	18 October 2022	Rotherham United	H	0–1	18,036		Report
16	22 October 2022	Coventry City	H	0–2	22,453		Report
17	29 October 2022	Norwich City	A	1–3	26,159	Powell 90+2'	Report
18	2 November 2022	Wigan Athletic	A	1–0	10,223	Tymon 62'	Report
19	5 November 2022	Birmingham City	H	1–2	22,459	Baker 75' (pen)	Report
20	8 November 2022	Luton Town	H	2–0	18,095	Powell 3', Lockyer 13' (o.g.)	Report
21	12 November 2022	West Bromwich Albion	A	0–2	23,728		Report
22	10 December 2022	Cardiff City	H	2–2	20,111	Campbell 11', Delap 18'	Report
23	17 December 2022	Bristol City	A	2–1	15,617	Delap 45+2', Brown 57'	Report
24	26 December 2022	Rotherham United	A	2–2	11,517	Campbell 61', Peltier 80' (o.g.)	Report
25	30 December 2022	Burnley	H	0–1	21,464		Report
26	2 January 2023	Preston North End	H	0–1	20,034		Report
27	14 January 2023	Sheffield United	A	1–3	29,644	Powell 45+1'	Report
28	21 January 2023	Reading	H	4–0	19,157	Smallbone 11', Campbell 57', Brown 80', Gayle 83'	Report
29	4 February 2023	Luton Town	A	0–1	10,031		Report
30	11 February 2023	Hull City	H	0–0	23,970		Report
31	15 February 2023	Huddersfield Town	H	3–0	17,700	Jagielka 13', Brown 73', Baker 90+4' (pen)	Report
32	18 February 2023	Blackpool	A	0–1	13,238		Report
33	21 February 2023	Swansea City	A	3–1	15,817	Laurent (2) 15', 19', Baker 90+3'	Report
34	25 February 2023	Millwall	H	0–1	19,773		Report
35	4 March 2023	Sunderland	A	5–1	43,064	Laurent 41', Campbell (2) 53', 57', Gayle (2) 68', 76'	Report
36	10 March 2023	Blackburn Rovers	H	3–2	17,427	Hoever (2) 24', 43', Campbell 75'	Report
37	14 March 2023	Middlesbrough	A	1–1	24,779	Hoever 45'	Report
38	18 March 2023	Norwich City	H	0–0	22,102		Report
39	1 April 2023	Coventry City	A	4–0	23,625	Brown 6', Campbell 40', Smallbone 71', Hoever 77'	Report
40	7 April 2023	Bristol City	H	1–2	22,826	Powell 36'	Report
41	10 April 2023	Birmingham City	A	0–0	17,413		Report
42	15 April 2023	West Bromwich Albion	H	1–2	23,486	Brown 30'	Report
43	18 April 2023	Wigan Athletic	H	0–1	17,726		Report
44	22 April 2023	Cardiff City	A	1–1	20,058	Laurent 16'	Report
45	29 April 2023	Queens Park Rangers	H	0–1	22,486		Report
46	8 May 2023	Watford	A	0–2	20,100		Report

==== League table ====
Pos	Team	Pld	W	D	L	GF	GA	GD	Pts
13	Norwich City	46	17	11	18	57	54	+3	62
14	Bristol City	46	15	14	17	55	56	−1	59
15	Hull City	46	14	16	16	51	61	−10	58
16	Stoke City	46	14	11	21	55	54	+1	53
17	Birmingham City	46	14	11	21	47	58	−11	53
18	Huddersfield Town	46	14	11	21	47	62	−15	53
19	Rotherham United	46	11	17	18	49	60	−11	50

Source: EFL Official Website
Rules for classification: 1) Points; 2) Goal difference; 3) Number of goals scored; 4) Head-to-head results; 5) Wins; 6) Away goals; 7) Penalty points (sec 9.5); 8) 12-point sending off offences

== FA Cup ==
Stoke City were drawn away at EFL League Two side Hartlepool United in the third Round, winning 3–0 with Hartlepool scoring two own goals and 3–1 at home to Stevenage in the fourth round. Premier League side Brighton & Hove Albion were the visitors in the fifth round, winning 1–0 with a first half strike from Evan Ferguson.

Round	Date	Opponent	Venue	Result	Attendance	Scorers	Report
R3	8 January 2023	Hartlepool United	A	3–0	4,340	Murray 16' (o.g.), Brown 43', Menayese 48' (o.g.)	Report
R4	29 January 2023	Stevenage	H	3–1	14,392	Brown 3', Laurent 73', Baker 80' (pen)	Report
R5	28 February 2023	Brighton & Hove Albion	H	0–1	12,949		Report

== EFL Cup ==
Stoke were drawn away to Morecambe in the first round, and they lost 5–3 on penalties following a goalless draw.

Round	Date	Opponent	Venue	Result	Attendance	Scorers	Report
R1	9 August 2022	Morecambe	A	0–0 (3–5 pens)	2,806		Report

== Squad statistics ==
No.	Pos.	Name	Championship		FA Cup		EFL Cup		Total		Discipline	
No.	Pos.	Name	Apps	Goals	Apps	Goals	Apps	Goals	Apps	Goals	Yellow card	Red card
1	GK	(England) Josef Bursik	16	0	0	0	0	0	16	0	1	0
1	GK	(Montenegro) Matija Sarkic	8	0	0	0	0	0	8	0	0	0
2	DF	(England) Harry Clarke	9(9)	2	1	0	0(1)	0	10(10)	2	2	0
3	DF	(Wales) Morgan Fox	35(5)	0	1(1)	0	1	0	37(6)	0	2	0
4	DF	(England) Aden Flint	9	0	0	0	0	0	9	0	1	0
5	DF	(Australia) Harry Souttar	7	0	0	0	0	0	7	0	4	0
5	DF	(England) Axel Tuanzebe	3(1)	0	1	0	0	0	4(1)	0	1	0
6	DF	(England) Phil Jagielka	26(1)	2	1(1)	0	1	0	28(2)	2	0	0
7	MF	(England) Sam Clucas	5(7)	0	0(1)	0	1	0	6(8)	0	0	0
8	MF	(England) Lewis Baker	30(14)	7	1(2)	1	1	0	32(16)	8	7	0
9	FW	(Scotland) Jacob Brown	30(8)	7	3	2	1	0	34(8)	9	9	0
10	FW	(England) Tyrese Campbell	30(11)	9	2	0	1	0	33(11)	9	4	0
11	FW	(England) Dwight Gayle	31(4)	3	0(1)	0	0(1)	0	31(6)	3	3	0
13	GK	(Republic of Ireland) Jack Bonham	23(1)	0	3	0	1	0	27(1)	0	0	0
14	DF	(England) Josh Tymon	19(9)	1	3	0	0	0	22(9)	1	2	0
15	MF	(Northern Ireland) Jordan Thompson	19(15)	0	3	0	1	0	23(15)	0	7	0
16	DF	(England) Ben Wilmot	39	3	2	0	0	0	41	3	6	0
17	FW	(England) Liam Delap	14(8)	3	1	0	0	0	15(8)	3	6	0
17	DF	(Netherlands) Ki-Jana Hoever	11(4)	4	1(1)	0	0	0	12(5)	4	0	0
18	MF	(Republic of Ireland) Will Smallbone	38(5)	3	1(1)	0	0(1)	0	39(7)	3	2	0
20	DF	(England) Dujon Sterling	24(2)	0	2	0	0	0	26(2)	0	2	0
22	MF	(Republic of Ireland) Gavin Kilkenny	1(2)	0	0	0	1	0	2(2)	0	1	0
22	MF	(England) Ben Pearson	14	0	0	0	0	0	14	0	8	1
23	MF	(Kosovo) Bersant Celina	3(3)	0	1(1)	0	0	0	4(4)	0	0	0
24	MF	(Ghana) Tariqe Fosu	13(7)	0	0	0	0	0	13(7)	0	3	0
25	MF	(England) Nick Powell	9(16)	4	1	0	0	0	10(16)	4	3	0
28	MF	(England) Josh Laurent	28(3)	4	3	1	0(1)	0	31(4)	5	7	0
29	MF	(England) D'Margio Wright-Phillips	0(7)	1	0	0	0(1)	0	0(8)	1	0	0
32	DF	(England) Connor Taylor	11(3)	0	2(1)	0	1	0	14(4)	0	4	0
33	DF	(Scotland) Lewis Macari	0	0	0(1)	0	0	0	0(1)	0	0	0
34	GK	(England) Frank Fielding	0	0	0	0	0	0	0	0	0	0
37	FW	(England) Emre Tezgel	0(3)	0	0(1)	0	0	0	0(4)	0	0	0
39	MF	(Wales) Tom Sparrow	1(1)	0	0	0	1	0	2(1)	0	0	0
45	FW	(England) Nathan Lowe	0(1)	0	0(1)	0	0	0	0(2)	0	0	0
Own goals			—	2	—	2	—	0	—	4	—	

== Transfers ==
=== In ===
Date	Pos.	Name	From	Fee	Ref.
29 June 2022	DF	(Scotland) Liam McCarron	(England) Leeds United	Undisclosed	
1 July 2022	DF	(England) Aden Flint	(Wales) Cardiff City	Free	
1 July 2022	MF	(England) Josh Laurent	(England) Reading	Free	
7 July 2022	FW	(Republic of Ireland) Dara McGuinness	(Republic of Ireland) Shamrock Rovers	Undisclosed	
7 July 2022	FW	(England) Kahrel Reddin	(England) Aston Villa	Undisclosed	
7 July 2022	MF	(England) Sonny Singh	(England) Sunderland	Undisclosed	
22 July 2022	FW	(England) Dwight Gayle	(England) Newcastle United	Free	
1 August 2022	GK	(England) Tommy Jackson	(England) Walsall	Free	
15 August 2022	FW	(Sweden) Edwin Andersson	(England) Chelsea	Free	
15 August 2022	FW	(England) Jacob Holland-Wilkinson	(England) Preston North End	Free	
15 August 2022	MF	(England) Ben Kershaw	(England) Rochdale	Free	
26 August 2022	DF	(Jamaica) Luke Badley-Morgan	(England) Chelsea	Free	
26 August 2022	DF	(England) Luke Redfern	(England) Burton Albion	Free	

=== Out ===
Date	Pos.	Name	To	Fee	Ref.
20 June 2022	MF	(England) Alfie Doughty	(England) Luton Town	Undisclosed	
28 June 2022	FW	(Democratic Republic of the Congo) Benik Afobe	(England) Millwall	Undisclosed	
30 June 2022	DF	(Wales) James Chester	(England) Derby County	Released	
30 June 2022	MF	(Wales) Joe Allen	(Wales) Swansea City	Released	
30 June 2022	DF	(England) Kieran Coates	(England) Chester	Released	
30 June 2022	FW	(Scotland) Steven Fletcher	(Scotland) Dundee United	Released	
30 June 2022	GK	(Scotland) Robbie Hemfrey	(England) Rotherham United	Released	
30 June 2022	MF	(England) Tom Ince	(England) Reading	Released	
30 June 2022	MF	(England) Pat Jarrett	(Scotland) Queens Park	Released	
30 June 2022	FW	(England) Max McCarthy	Unattached	Released	
30 June 2022	FW	(Wales) Christian Norton	(England) Cheltenham Town	Released	
30 June 2022	MF	(England) Adam Porter	(England) Salford City	Released	
30 June 2022	DF	(England) Tommy Smith	(England) Middlesbrough	Released	
8 July 2022	FW	(Republic of Ireland) Ethon Varian	(Republic of Ireland) Bohemian	Free	
26 July 2022	DF	(England) Will Forrester	(England) Port Vale	Undisclosed	
15 September 2022	MF	(Nigeria) Peter Etebo	(Greece) Aris Thessaloniki	Undisclosed	
9 January 2023	FW	(England) Will Goodwin	(England) Cheltenham Town	Undisclosed	
10 January 2023	DF	(Wales) Eddy Jones	(England) Altrincham	Undisclosed	
14 January 2023	GK	(England) Josef Bursik	(Belgium) Club Brugge	Undisclosed	
31 January 2023	DF	(Australia) Harry Souttar	(England) Leicester City	Undisclosed	

=== Loans in ===
Date from	Pos.	Name	From	Date to	Ref.
20 June 2022	DF	(England) Harry Clarke	(England) Arsenal	19 January 2023 (Note: On 19 January, Clarke was recalled back to Arsenal and was sold to Ipswich Town)	
2 July 2022	MF	(Republic of Ireland) Gavin Kilkenny	(England) AFC Bournemouth	31 January 2023 (Note: On 31 January, Kilkenny was recalled back to Bournemouth and loaned to Charlton)	
23 July 2022	MF	(Republic of Ireland) Will Smallbone	(England) Southampton	End of Season	
16 August 2022	FW	(Ghana) Tariqe Fosu	(England) Brentford	20 January 2023 (Note: On 20 January, Fosu was recalled back to Brentford and loaned to Rotherham United)	
18 August 2022	FW	(England) Liam Delap	(England) Manchester City	12 January 2023 (Note: On 12 January, Delap was recalled back to Manchester City and loaned to Preston North End)	
1 September 2022	DF	(England) Dujon Sterling	(England) Chelsea	End of Season	
25 January 2023	GK	(Montenegro) Matija Sarkic	(England) Wolverhampton Wanderers	End of Season	
26 January 2023	MF	(Kosovo) Bersant Celina	(France) Dijon	End of Season	
27 January 2023	DF	(Netherlands) Ki-Jana Hoever	(England) Wolverhampton Wanderers	End of Season	
31 January 2023	MF	(England) Ben Pearson	(England) AFC Bournemouth	End of Season	
31 January 2023	DF	(England) Axel Tuanzebe	(England) Manchester United	End of Season	

=== Loans out ===
Date from	Pos.	Name	To	On loan until	Ref.
18 June 2022	MF	(Bosnia and Herzegovina) Mario Vrančić	(Croatia) HNK Rijeka	End of season	
27 June 2022	MF	(England) Tashan Oakley-Boothe	(England) Lincoln City	End of season	
1 July 2022	FW	(England) Douglas James-Taylor	(England) Walsall	End of season	
19 July 2022	FW	(England) Will Goodwin	(England) Torquay United	1 January 2023	
26 July 2022	GK	(England) Tommy Simkin	(England) AFC Fylde	31 August 2022	
1 September 2022	DF	(England) Tom Edwards	(England) Barnsley	16 January 2023 (Note: On 16 January, Edwards returned from his loan at Barnsley due to a serious knee injury)	
1 September 2022	MF	(Scotland) Liam McCarron	(England) Port Vale	End of season	
2 September 2022	DF	(Wales) Eddy Jones	(England) Altrincham	1 January 2023	
2 September 2022	MF	(Wales) Dan Malone	(England) Altrincham	1 January 2023	
2 September 2022	DF	(Republic of Ireland) David Okagbue	(England) Oldham Athletic	8 January 2023 (Note: On 29 September, Okagbue's loan at Oldham was extended until January 8)	
9 September 2022	DF	(England) Demeaco Duhaney	(Turkey) İstanbulspor	End of season	
24 September 2022	GK	(Cameroon) Blondy Nna Noukeu	(England) Southend United	7 March 2023 (Note: In January, Nna Noukeu's loan was extended to the end of February 2023, On 3 April it was extended again for a further 28 days but four days later he was recalled by Stoke.)	
7 January 2023	DF	(Wales) Tom Sparrow	(Scotland) Hamilton Academical	30 June 2023	
27 January 2023	DF	(Wales) Matt Baker	(Wales) Newport County	30 June 2023	
27 January 2023	DF	(England) Aden Flint	(England) Sheffield Wednesday	30 June 2023	
31 January 2023	MF	(England) D'Margio Wright-Phillips	(England) Northampton Town	30 June 2023	
17 February 2023	MF	(Wales) Dan Malone	(England) AFC Fylde	30 June 2023	
