= Sonny Singh =

English footballer (born 2004)

Personal information
- Full name: Sonny Lakhraj Lohia Singh
- Date of birth: 13 February 2004 (age 22)
- Position: Midfielder

Team information
- Current team: Barwell

Youth career
- Leicester City
- –2022: Sunderland

Senior career*
Years	Team	Apps	(Gls)
2022–2024	Stoke City	0	(0)
2023	→ Hereford (loan)	3	(0)
2023–2024	→ Rushall Olympic (loan)	5	(0)
2024	→ Woking (loan)	0	(0)
2025–	Barwell	25	(0)
- * Club domestic league appearances and goals as of 22:13, 12 March 2026 (UTC)

Sonny Lakhraj Lohia Singh (born 13 February 2004) is an English semi-professional footballer who plays as a midfielder for Northern Premier League Division One Midlands club Barwell.

== Career ==
Born in the Midlands, England, Singh started his youth career with Leicester City, before moving to Sunderland and featuring for their U18 side in the U18 Premier League. On 5 July 2022, Singh signed for Stoke City. He played for the club's U18 side in the U18 Premier League, before graduating to the U21 side and featuring in the Premier League 2. On 4 August 2023, Singh joined National League North club Hereford on loan until 1 January 2024. He returned to Stoke on 18 October, after making four appearances.

In November 2023, he joined National League North club Rushall Olympic on a one-month loan deal. On 31 March 2024, it was announced that Singh had agreed to join National League side Woking on loan until the end of the season. He was released by Stoke at the end of the 2023–24 season.

== Career statistics ==
As of match played 31 March 2024

Appearances and goals by club, season and competition
Club	Season	League			FA Cup		League Cup		Other		Total	
Club	Season	Division	Apps	Goals	Apps	Goals	Apps	Goals	Apps	Goals	Apps	Goals
Stoke City	2022–23	EFL Championship	0	0	0	0	0	0	0	0	0	0
Hereford (loan)	2023–24	National League North	3	0	1	0	—		—		4	0
Rushall Olympic (loan)	2023–24	National League North	5	0	—		—		—		5	0
Woking (loan)	2023–24	National League	0	0	—		—		—		0	0
Career total			8	0	1	0	0	0	0	0	9	0
