= Ki-Jana Hoever =

Dutch footballer (born 2002)

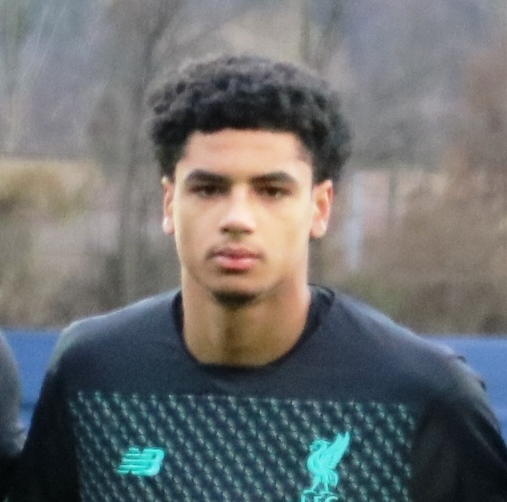
- Hoever lining up for Liverpool in 2019

Personal information
- Full name: Ki-Jana Delano Hoever
- Date of birth: 18 January 2002 (age 24)
- Place of birth: Amsterdam, Netherlands
- Height: 1.83 m (6 ft 0 in)
- Positions: Right-back; centre-back

Team information
- Current team: Sparta Prague
- Number: 25

Youth career
- 2008-2010: SC Buitenveldert
- 2010–2018: Ajax
- 2018–2019: Liverpool

Senior career*
Years	Team	Apps	(Gls)
2019–2020	Liverpool	0	(0)
2020–2026	Wolverhampton Wanderers	28	(0)
2022–2023	→ PSV (loan)	5	(0)
2022–2023	→ Jong PSV (loan)	2	(0)
2023–2024	→ Stoke City (loan)	55	(8)
2024–2025	→ Auxerre (loan)	30	(1)
2026	→ Sheffield United (loan)	15	(0)
2026–	Sparta Prague	5	(0)

International career
2017	Netherlands U15	4	(0)
2017–2018	Netherlands U16	6	(0)
2018–2019	Netherlands U17	18	(5)
2019–2021	Netherlands U18	3	(0)
2021–2022	Netherlands U21	5	(1)
- * Club domestic league appearances and goals as of 25 October 2026

Ki-Jana Delano Hoever (/kiːˈdʒɑːnə/ kee-JAWN-ə; born 18 January 2002) is a Dutch professional footballer who plays as a right-back or right wing-back for Czech First League club Sparta Prague.

== Early life ==
Ki-Jana Delano Hoever was born on 18 January 2002 in Amsterdam, Netherlands. He is of Surinamese descent. His father, a former American football player, named him after former NFL running back Ki-Jana Carter.

== Early career ==
After being spotted at local club SC Buitenveldert, Hoever started out in the youth ranks at Ajax in 2010. Hoever played 13 times and scored two goals in the Under-17 Eredivisie during the 2017–18 season. Described as equally comfortable playing at centre-half and right-back, Hoever completed his move to Liverpool in August 2018 from Ajax but had to wait until September 2018 for international clearance. As he had not signed a professional contract, Liverpool only had to pay a minimal compensation and Ajax were reported to be bitterly disappointed to lose the player. Fellow English clubs Manchester City, Manchester United and Chelsea were also reportedly interested in making the signing. Hoever made his first Liverpool appearance in a 4–1 win for the under-18s against Newcastle on 15 September. Following that he was given a substitute appearance in the Reds' UEFA Youth League match at home to Paris Saint-Germain that ended in a 5–2 win on 18 September 2018. He later played the full 90 minutes at centre-half in the 5–0 win over Napoli that sealed Liverpool's U18s place in the knockout stages of that tournament.

By November 2018, Hoever had his U23s debut as a wide right midfielder against league leaders Everton at Goodison Park, which Liverpool won. His performance earned praise from U23 manager Neil Critchley, who said, "I thought his calmness and assurance, his decision-making, his intelligence without the ball, it was terrific. I was very impressed with him indeed." Hoever made further appearances at right-back for the U23s including receiving plaudits for his performance in a 4–1 win against the reigning Premier League 2 champions Arsenal.

== Club career ==
=== Liverpool ===
In December 2018 Hoever began training with the Liverpool first team, with manager Jürgen Klopp describing him as "confident" and "a joy to watch." Hoever was given the squad number 51 ahead of the FA Cup game against Wolverhampton Wanderers at Molineux Stadium on 7 January 2019. He started the match on the bench, but replaced an injured Dejan Lovren at centre-back in the opening minutes. Hoever's appearance made him the youngest ever Liverpool player in the FA Cup and their third youngest in any competition.

He signed a long-term professional contract with the club on 31 July 2019.

His first professional goal came on 25 September 2019 in an EFL Cup match against Milton Keynes Dons. Upon scoring, at the age of 17 years, eight months and 10 days, Hoever became the fourth-youngest player to find the back of the net for Liverpool, behind Ben Woodburn, Michael Owen and Jordan Rossiter.

=== Wolverhampton Wanderers ===
On 19 September 2020, Hoever completed a £9 million transfer to Wolverhampton Wanderers. Hoever made his first appearance in the Premier League, and his debut for Wolves, as a second-half substitute in a 4–0 defeat away to West Ham United on 27 September 2020. He made his debut Molineux appearance for Wolves in the team's next match, a 1–0 victory in the Premier League over Fulham on 4 October, also as a second-half substitute.

Hoever made his full Premier League debut away to Manchester United on 29 December 2020, a game which Wolves lost narrowly to a deflection in added time.

==== Loan to PSV ====
On 23 June 2022, Hoever joined PSV on a season-long loan.

==== Loan to Stoke City ====
On 27 January 2023, Hoever joined Championship club Stoke City on loan until the end of the season. On 10 March 2023 he scored his first goals for the club, netting twice in a 3–2 home victory over Blackburn Rovers. Hoever made 17 appearances, scoring four goals from full back, becoming a popular player among the supporters during his short time at the club. Hoever returned to Stoke on loan for the 2023–24 season. He scored on the opening day of the season in a 4–1 win against Rotherham United. Stoke were involved in a relegation fight throughout the campaign with Hoever making some mistakes leading to opposition goals. Stoke's and Hoever's form picked up towards the end of the season and they secured their Championship status in the penultimate game against Southampton.

==== Loan to Auxerre ====
On 21 August 2024, Hoever joined newly promoted Ligue 1 club Auxerre on a season-long loan deal.

==== Loan to Sheffield United ====
After spending the first half of the 2025–26 season as part of Wolves' squad in the Premier League, on 8 January 2026, Hoever was sent on loan to EFL Championship side Sheffield United until the end of the season.

=== Sparta Prague ===
On 25 August 2026, Hoever left Wolves and signed for Czech First League club Sparta Prague for an undisclosed fee.

== International career ==
Born in the Netherlands, Hoever is of Surinamese descent. Hoever is a Netherlands U17 international, scoring three goals in his first five games. He participated in the U17 European Championships in Ireland in 2019, a tournament which the Netherlands won. Hoever started as the Netherlands beat Italy in the final with a scoreline of 4–2, a game which saw Hoever hit the post from a free-kick, which provided the assist for the Dutch's second goal.

== Career statistics ==
As of match played 2 May 2026

Appearances and goals by club, season and competition
Club	Season	League			National cup (Note: Includes FA Cup)		League cup (Note: Includes EFL Cup)		Europe		Other		Total	
Club	Season	Division	Apps	Goals	Apps	Goals	Apps	Goals	Apps	Goals	Apps	Goals	Apps	Goals
Liverpool	2018–19	Premier League	0	0	1	0	0	0	0	0	—		1	0
Liverpool	2019–20	Premier League	0	0	1	0	2	1	0	0	0	0	3	1
Liverpool	2020–21	Premier League	0	0	—		—		—		0	0	0	0
Liverpool	Total		0	0	2	0	2	1	0	0	0	0	4	1
Wolverhampton Wanderers	2020–21	Premier League	12	0	3	0	—		—		—		15	0
Wolverhampton Wanderers	2021–22	Premier League	8	0	0	0	2	0	—		—		10	0
Wolverhampton Wanderers	2025–26	Premier League	8	0	—		0	0	—		—		8	0
Wolverhampton Wanderers	Total		28	0	3	0	2	0	—		—		33	0
Wolverhampton Wanderers U21	2020–21	—	—		—		—		—		3 (Note: Appearances in EFL Trophy)	0	3	0
PSV Eindhoven (loan)	2022–23	Eredivisie	5	0	0	0	—		2 (Note: Appearances in UEFA Europa League)	0	1 (Note: Appearance in Johan Cruyff Shield)	0	8	0
Jong PSV (loan)	2022–23	Eerste Divisie	2	0	—		—		—		—		2	0
Stoke City (loan)	2022–23	Championship	15	4	2	0	0	0	—		—		17	4
Stoke City (loan)	2023–24	Championship	40	4	1	0	3	0	—		—		44	4
Stoke City (loan)	Total		55	8	3	0	3	0	—		—		61	8
Auxerre (loan)	2024–25	Ligue 1	29	1	0	0	—		—		—		29	1
Sheffield United (loan)	2025–26	Championship	15	0	1	0	—		—		0	0	16	0
Sparta Prague	2026–27	Czech First League	0	0	0	0	—		0	0	—		0	0
Career total			134	9	9	0	7	1	2	0	4	0	156	10

== Honours ==
Liverpool

- UEFA Champions League: 2018–19
- UEFA Super Cup: 2019
- FIFA Club World Cup: 2019

PSV

- Johan Cruyff Shield: 2022

Netherlands U17

- UEFA European Under-17 Championship: 2019

Individual

- UEFA European Under-17 Championship Team of the Tournament: 2019
