= Ben Wilmot =

English footballer (born 1999)

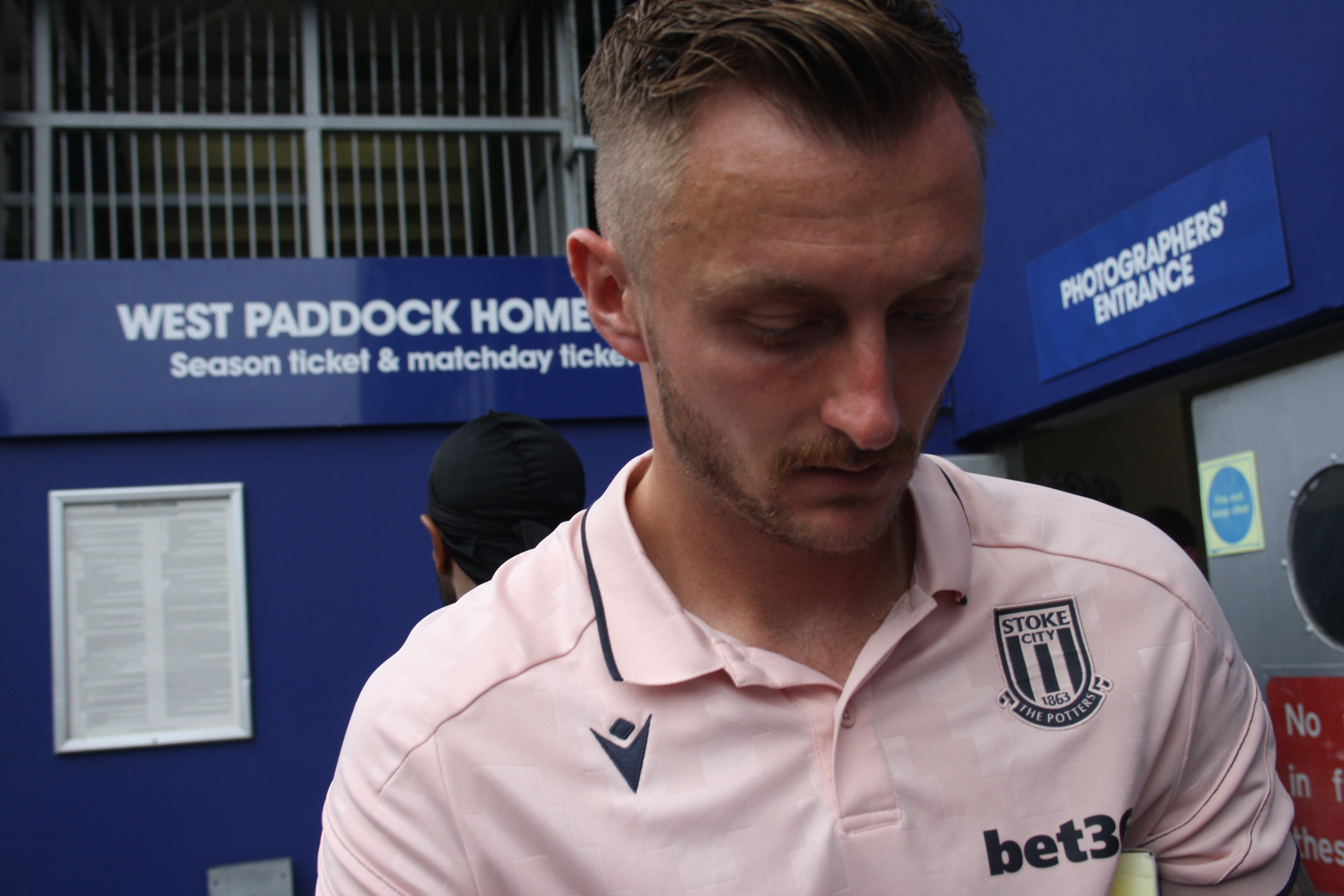
- Wilmot in 2025

Personal information
- Full name: Benjamin Lewis Wilmot
- Date of birth: 4 November 1999 (age 27)
- Place of birth: Stevenage, England
- Height: 6 ft 2 in (1.88 m)
- Position: Centre-back

Team information
- Current team: Stoke City
- Number: 16

Youth career
- –2014: Hitchin Town
- 2014–2017: Stevenage

Senior career*
Years	Team	Apps	(Gls)
2017–2018	Stevenage	10	(0)
2018–2021	Watford	27	(1)
2019	→ Udinese (loan)	5	(0)
2019–2020	→ Swansea City (loan)	21	(2)
2021–	Stoke City	188	(14)

International career
2018	England U19	2	(0)
2018–2019	England U20	2	(0)
2019–2021	England U21	4	(1)
- * Club domestic league appearances and goals as of 20:35, 21 November 2026 (UTC)

Benjamin Lewis Wilmot (born 4 November 1999) is an English professional footballer who plays as a centre-back for EFL Championship club Stoke City.

Wilmot began playing football in the academies at Hitchin Town and Stevenage, breaking into Stevenage's first team during the 2017–18 season. He signed for Watford in May 2018 and was loaned to Serie A club Udinese in January 2019. In July 2019, he joined Championship club Swansea City on loan. Wilmot returned to Watford and helped the club earn promotion to the Premier League during the 2020–21 season. He signed for Stoke City in June 2021. Internationally, Wilmot has represented England at under-19, under-20, and under-21 level.

== Early life ==
Born in Stevenage, Hertfordshire, Wilmot is the son of former Stevenage goalkeeper Richard Wilmot, who made over 150 appearances for the club. He attended Hitchin Boys' School and played in the youth teams at Hitchin Town.

== Club career ==
=== Stevenage ===
Wilmot joined Stevenage as an academy scholar, and progressed through the youth system of his hometown club. As a first-year scholar, he signed his first professional contract with Stevenage in April 2017, after playing regularly throughout the club's FA Youth Cup run in the 2016–17 season.

He made his first-team debut on 3 October 2017, playing the whole match in central defence as Stevenage drew 0–0 away at Milton Keynes Dons in the EFL Trophy. Wilmot established himself as a first-team regular in January 2018, helping Stevenage keep three clean sheets in six matches. During the January 2018 transfer window, the club's chairman Phil Wallace stated that Stevenage had rejected three bids from Premier League clubs for Wilmot, including a £500,000 offer from Watford, whilst Tottenham Hotspur offered "slightly less". Wilmot did not feature in any matches from the start of April 2018 until the remainder of the season with a transfer nearing completion. He made 15 appearances during the season.

=== Watford ===
Wilmot signed for Premier League club Watford on 24 May 2018, for an undisclosed fee on a five-year contract. Stevenage stated that the transfer constituted a club record fee received and that the total could increase significantly based on Wilmot's future appearances. Wilmot made his first-team debut for Watford in the club's EFL Cup tie away to Reading on 29 August 2018, starting and playing the full match in a 2–0 victory.

==== Loan spells ====
Wilmot joined Serie A club Udinese on loan on 31 January 2019 for the remainder of the 2018–19 season. He made his debut for Udinese in a 4–1 defeat away to Juventus on 8 March 2019, playing the first half of the match. Wilmot made five appearances for Udinese during the loan spell.

Ahead of the 2019–20 season, on 25 July 2019, Wilmot joined Championship club Swansea City on a season-long loan. He made his Swansea debut in a 3–1 home victory over Northampton Town in the EFL Cup on 13 August 2019, playing the whole match. Wilmot made only two appearances in the opening two months of the season, eventually making his Championship debut as a late substitute in a 2–1 away win at Charlton Athletic on 2 October 2019. He scored his first goal for the club in the South Wales derby; his first-half header proved decisive in an eventual 1–0 victory on 27 October 2019. Wilmot sustained a knee injury in Swansea's 1–1 draw with Millwall on 30 June 2020, being substituted in the 83rd minute. The injury ruled him out of the remainder of the 2019–20 season, and he returned to Watford to undergo rehabilitation. He made 23 appearances during the loan agreement at Swansea, scoring two goals.

==== Return to Watford ====
With Watford having been relegated to the Championship the previous season, Wilmot began the 2020–21 season as a regular starter. He scored his first goal for Watford in a 1–1 draw against Queens Park Rangers on 21 November 2020. Wilmot played 27 times during a season in which Watford secured promotion back into the Premier League after finishing in second place in the Championship.

=== Stoke City ===
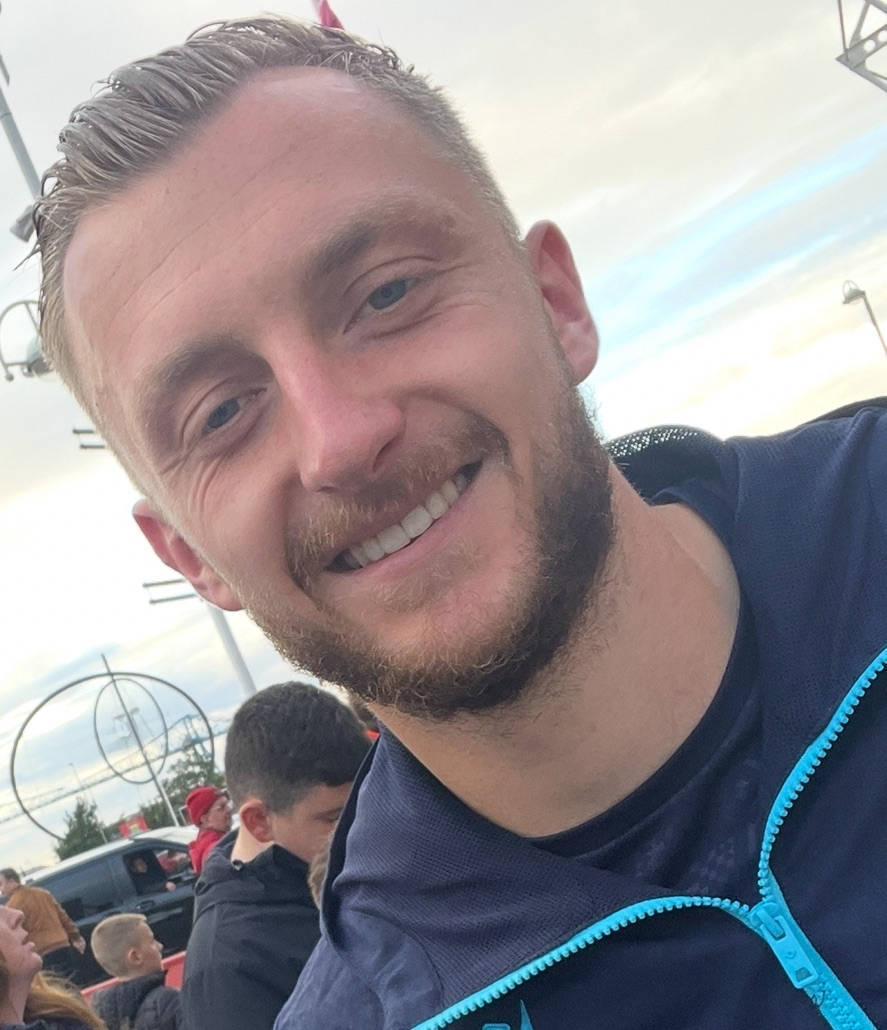
Wilmot pictured during his time at Stoke City in 2024.

Described as playing "a pivotal role" in Watford's automatic promotion-winning season, Wilmot attracted transfer interest from a number of clubs. He signed for Championship club Stoke City for an undisclosed fee on 24 June 2021, agreeing a four-year contract. He scored his first goal for the club, a 30-yard strike, in a 2–1 home defeat to Preston North End on 3 January 2022, a goal that won the Championship Goal of the Month award for January and was later nominated for the EFL Goal of the Season award. Wilmot made 39 appearances during the 2021–22 season as Stoke finished 14th in the Championship. He was voted the club's Player of the Year for the 2022–23 season, having made 41 appearances and scored three goals. Wilmot sustained a season-ending back fracture in a match against West Bromwich Albion on 17 April 2023.

Wilmot signed a three-year contract extension with Stoke on 12 May 2023. Having started the 2023–24 season as a regular in the first team, Wilmot sustained a knee injury after colliding with the goalpost in a match against Southampton in October 2023, which limited him to 29 appearances. During the 2024–25 season, Wilmot formed a central defensive partnership with Ashley Phillips, making 42 appearances as Stoke avoided relegation on the final day of the season.

Appointed captain by Mark Robins for the 2025–26 season, Wilmot scored twice in a 2–2 draw with Leicester City on 21 February 2026. He made 37 appearances as Stoke finished 17th, although his season ended prematurely through injury. Stoke exercised a 12-month extension clause in his contract in May 2026.

== International career ==
Wilmot was called up to represent the England under-19 team in March 2018 for their three 2018 UEFA European under-19 Championship qualification matches in Skopje. He was the only player in the squad not contracted to a club playing in the top two divisions of English football. Wilmot made his England under-19 debut in a 3–0 victory over Latvia on 24 March 2018, appearing as an 84th-minute substitute. In doing so, he became the first Stevenage player to represent England at youth level.

Wilmot was included in the England under-21 squad on 30 August 2019. Wilmot received another call-up in October 2019 and made his under-21 debut in a 2–2 draw against Slovenia under-21s in Maribor on 11 October 2019, coming on as a second-half substitute. He scored his first goal at under-21 level during a 3–1 victory over Andorra under-21s at Molineux on 13 November 2020.

Through FIFA's grandparent rule, Wilmot is also eligible to represent the Republic of Ireland.

== Style of play ==
Described as a "ball-playing midfielder" during his time in the youth system at Stevenage, Wilmot later moved into central defence, where he was deployed during his breakthrough season with the club's first team. Following his transfer to Watford, manager Javi Gracia stated that Wilmot "has the intelligence" to play in a holding midfield role positioned in front of the two central defenders. He was subsequently utilised there during the 2018–19 season for both Watford and Udinese. Wilmot considers himself primarily a defender, although he has stated he is also comfortable playing in midfield. He has said he does not model his game on any other player, but instead "takes inspiration from technically-gifted players" such as Sergio Busquets.

== Career statistics ==
As of match played 21 November 2026

Appearances and goals by club, season and competition
Club	Season	League			National cup (Note: Includes FA Cup)		League cup (Note: Includes EFL Cup)		Other		Total	
Club	Season	Division	Apps	Goals	Apps	Goals	Apps	Goals	Apps	Goals	Apps	Goals
Stevenage	2016–17	League Two	0	0	0	0	0	0	0	0	0	0
Stevenage	2017–18	League Two	10	0	3	0	0	0	2 (Note: Appearances in the EFL Trophy)	0	15	0
Stevenage	Total		10	0	3	0	0	0	2	0	15	0
Watford	2018–19	Premier League	2	0	2	0	2	0	—		6	0
Watford	2019–20	Premier League	0	0	0	0	—		—		0	0
Watford	2020–21	Championship	25	1	1	0	1	0	—		27	1
Watford	Total		27	1	3	0	3	0	0	0	33	1
Udinese (loan)	2018–19	Serie A	5	0	—		—		—		5	0
Swansea City (loan)	2019–20	Championship	21	2	0	0	2	0	—		23	2
Stoke City	2021–22	Championship	35	1	2	0	2	0	—		39	1
Stoke City	2022–23	Championship	39	3	2	0	0	0	—		41	3
Stoke City	2023–24	Championship	25	1	1	0	3	0	—		29	1
Stoke City	2024–25	Championship	39	3	1	0	2	0	—		42	3
Stoke City	2025–26	Championship	34	3	2	0	1	0	—		37	3
Stoke City	2026–27	Championship	16	3	0	0	2	0	—		18	3
Stoke City	Total		188	14	8	0	10	0	0	0	206	14
Career total			251	17	14	0	15	0	2	0	282	17

== Honours ==
Individual

- EFL League Two Apprentice of the Year: 2017–18
- Stoke City Player of the Year: 2022–23
