= Jared Dublin =

American association football analyst

- Born: Jared Dublin
- Education: UC Berkeley; University of Liverpool
- Occupations: Association football analyst Association football scout

Jared Dublin is an American association football analyst and scout.

He has previously worked for several clubs across England, including Hull City, Reading, Sheffield United, and Stoke City.

== Biography ==
Dublin is American. Between 2010 and 2013, he studied Sociology at UC Berkeley. After graduating, he worked firstly for SoftLayer and later Google, spending both jobs stationed in San Francisco. In 2016, Dublin changed careers and undertook a Football Industries MBA at the University of Liverpool for a year.

Following this, he signed for Sheffield United as a recruitment analyst and first team scout. He became the club's Chief Scout in June 2019. Dublin left the Blades in favour of becoming the Head of Scouting at Reading in February 2023, a role that he would ultimately leave after just five months. On 26 June 2023, he joined Stoke City to become their Head of Recruitment. However, after the conclusion of the 2023–24 season Dublin once again moved on.

On 14 August 2024, it was announced that the outgoing Dublin was to become the Head of Recruitment at Hull City, whilst his predecessor, Lee Darnbrough, had made the reverse move to Stoke only a month prior. In October 2024, Hull's vice-chairman Tan Kesler left the club, and as a part of a major management reshuffle, Dublin was promoted to become Hull's new sporting director. Despite promotion to the Premier League at the end of the 2025–26 campaign, the club parted ways with Dublin on 6 July 2026. It was later revealed by some outlets that a salary disagreement had led to Dublin's sudden departure.
