= Josh Laurent =

English footballer (born 1995]

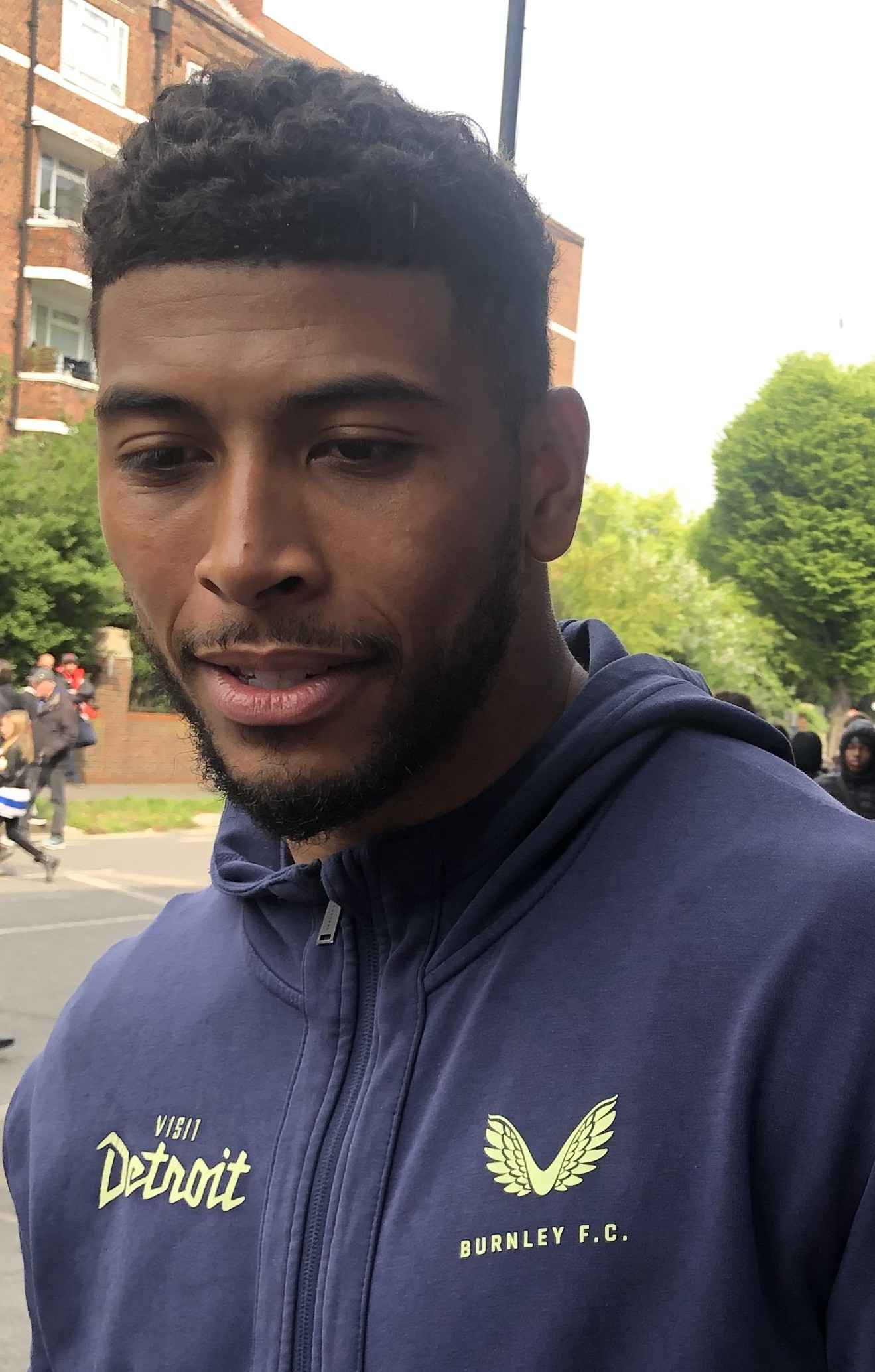
- Laurent with Burnley in 2025.

Personal information
- Full name: Joshua Ishaele Jacob-Heron Hunt-Laurent
- Date of birth: 6 May 1995 (age 31)
- Place of birth: Leytonstone, England
- Height: 6 ft 2 in (1.88 m)
- Positions: Midfielder; centre-back; right wing-back

Team information
- Current team: Burnley
- Number: 29

Youth career
- Chelsea
- Redbridge
- –2012: Wycombe Wanderers
- 2012–2013: Queens Park Rangers

Senior career*
Years	Team	Apps	(Gls)
2013–2015	Queens Park Rangers	0	(0)
2014	→ Braintree Town (loan)	16	(0)
2015–2016	Brentford	0	(0)
2015	→ Newport County (loan)	3	(0)
2016–2017	Hartlepool United	28	(1)
2017–2018	Wigan Athletic	1	(0)
2017–2018	→ Bury (loan)	22	(1)
2018–2020	Shrewsbury Town	73	(4)
2020–2022	Reading	86	(5)
2022–2024	Stoke City	72	(5)
2024–	Burnley	89	(4)
- * Club domestic league appearances and goals as of 09:39, 8 November 2026 (UTC)

Joshua Ishaele Jacob-Heron Hunt-Laurent (born 6 May 1995), known simply as Josh Laurent, is an English professional footballer who plays as a midfielder, centre-back or right wing-back for EFL Championship club Burnley.

Laurent began his professional career with Queens Park Rangers in 2013. After a loan spell at Braintree Town he moved on to Brentford in January 2015 and was loaned out to Newport County. In January 2016, Laurent joined Hartlepool United on a free transfer. He went on to play for Wigan Athletic, Bury and Shrewsbury Town before earning a move to Championship side Reading in July 2020. In his first season with the Royals Laurent won the clubs player of the season award. After two years with Reading, Laurent joined Stoke City in June 2022.

== Club career ==
=== Early career ===
Laurent was born in Leytonstone and attended Beal High School. Laurent began his career in the youth systems at Chelsea, Redbridge (where his father Burt was coach) and Wycombe Wanderers and signed a scholarship deal with the latter club in 2011. After a trial with Premier League club Liverpool.

=== Queens Park Rangers ===
Laurent moved into the academy at Queens Park Rangers prior to the beginning of the 2012–13 season. He made 20 appearances in the youth team's victorious 2012–13 Professional U18 Development League 2 campaign and played the full 90 minutes of the 1–0 win over Huddersfield Town in the final. Laurent signed his first professional contract in May 2013, a one-year deal. Laurent continued to play in the Development Squad through the 2013–14 and 2014–15 seasons.

Laurent signed for Conference Premier side Braintree Town on a one-month loan on 17 February 2014. He made the first senior appearance of his career with a start in a 2–2 draw with Kidderminster Harriers five days later. Laurent won praise for his performances from manager Alan Devonshire and remained at Cressing Road for a second month, before departing after his 16th appearance on 12 April.

He departed QPR on 14 January 2015. The departure of Laurent caused a "reaction" at Loftus Road, with the supporters questioning the club's commitment to its younger players. On 23 January, Rangers' Head of Football Operations Les Ferdinand revealed that he had been unable to convince Laurent that there was a pathway from the Development Squad to the first team.

=== Brentford ===
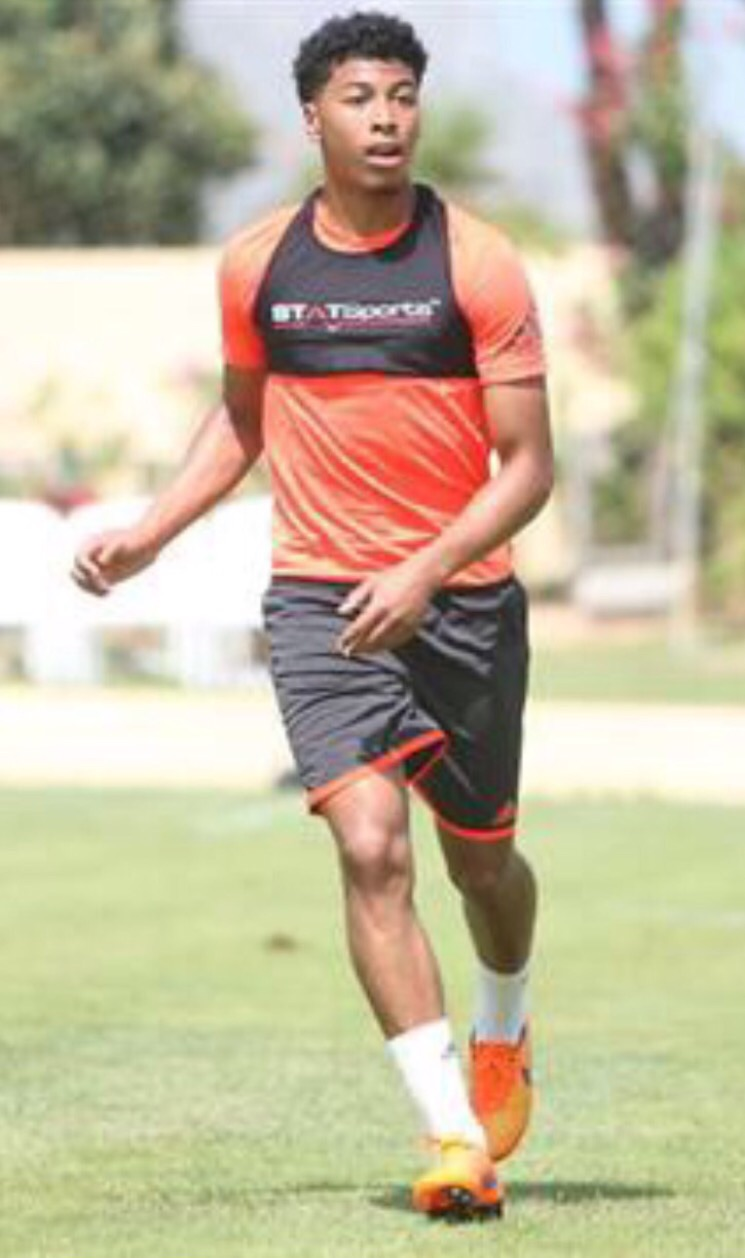
Laurent training with Brentford in 2015.

On 14 January 2015, Laurent moved across West London to sign for Championship side Brentford on a one-and-a-half-year Development Squad deal for an undisclosed fee. Laurent signed for League Two side Newport County on a 28-day youth loan on 19 August 2015, which was later extended to 14 October. He made his debut (the first Football League appearance of his career) as a 74th-minute substitute for Scott Boden in a 3–2 defeat to Leyton Orient three days later. He made his first start for the club on 1 September, playing the opening 73 minutes of the Exiles' shootout defeat to Swindon Town in the Football League Trophy first round. Laurent was left out of incoming manager John Sheridan's first squad on 3 October and was recalled by Brentford five days later, having made four appearances. He made his only first team appearance in the League Cup first round versus Oxford United on 11 August, playing the full 90 minutes of the 4–0 defeat. Laurent failed to feature in another first team squad before his contract was terminated by mutual consent on 1 February 2016. He made 21 appearances and scored five goals for the Development Squad.

=== Hartlepool United ===
On 1 February 2016, Laurent joined League Two club Hartlepool United on a free transfer. Laurent scored his first and only goal for the club in a 3–1 defeat to Leyton Orient on 22 October 2016 and remained with the club until February 2017, by which time he had made 33 appearances.

=== Wigan Athletic ===
On 1 February 2017, Laurent joined Championship club Wigan Athletic on a two-and-a-half-year contract for an undisclosed fee. He made just one appearance before the end of the 2016–17 season, at the end of which the Latics were relegated to League One. He scored his only goal for Wigan in a 2–1 EFL Cup win against Blackpool on 8 August 2017. On 31 August 2017, Bury signed Laurent on loan for the rest of the 2017–18 season. He played 22 games for the Shakers scoring once as they suffered relegation to League Two.

=== Shrewsbury Town ===
On 23 July 2018, Laurent joined League One side Shrewsbury Town on a two-year deal. He was a first-team regular during his first season at the club, making a notable contribution in the third-round of the FA Cup, where he both won the penalty that led to Shrewsbury's equaliser and then went on to score the winning goal against Championship side Stoke City. Laurent became a free agent after his contract expired at the end of the 2019–20 EFL League One season.

=== Reading ===
On 28 July 2020, Laurent joined Championship club Reading on a two-year contract. He scored his first goal for Reading in a 4–2 win over Blackburn Rovers on 27 October 2020. Laurent made 46 appearances, scoring three goals in 2020–21 as the Royals missed out on a play-off position finishing in seventh. Prior to Reading's last game of the season, on 8 May 2021, Laurent was announced as the clubs player of the season. In 2021–22, Laurent played 42 times as Reading struggled at the foot of table, finishing four points above the relegation zone.

=== Stoke City ===
On 21 June 2022, Laurent joined Stoke City a three-year contract. He scored his first goal for Stoke on 29 January 2023 in an FA Cup tie against Stevenage. He scored his first league goals in a 3–1 win against Swansea City on 21 February 2023. In the 2022–23 season, Laurent scored five goals in 36 appearances as Stoke finished in 16th. He was appointed club captain by Alex Neil ahead of the 2023–24 season, taking over from Lewis Baker. Laurent made 40 appearances for Stoke in 2023–24 as the team avoided relegation, finishing in 17th.

=== Burnley ===
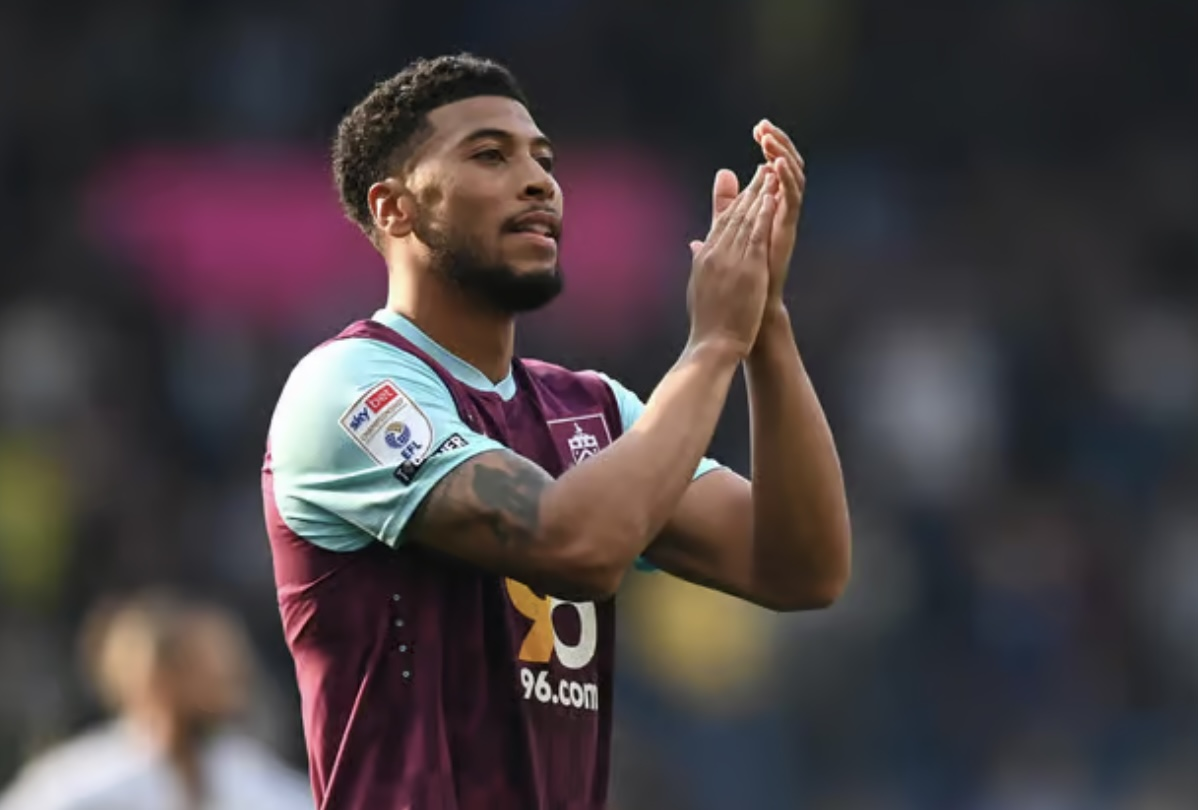
Laurent with Burnley in 2025

Laurent signed for Burnley on 30 August 2024 for an undisclosed fee on a two-year contract.

== Career statistics ==
As of match played 7 November 2026

Appearances and goals by club, season and competition
Club	Season	League			FA Cup		League Cup		Other		Total	
Club	Season	Division	Apps	Goals	Apps	Goals	Apps	Goals	Apps	Goals	Apps	Goals
Braintree Town (loan)	2013–14	Conference Premier	16	0	—		—		—		16	0
Brentford	2015–16	Championship	0	0	0	0	1	0	—		1	0
Newport County (loan)	2015–16	League Two	3	0	—		—		1 (Note: Appearance(s) in EFL Trophy)	0	4	0
Hartlepool United	2015–16	League Two	3	0	—		—		—		3	0
Hartlepool United	2016–17	League Two	25	1	2	0	1	0	2	0	30	1
Hartlepool United	Total		28	1	2	0	1	0	2	0	33	1
Wigan Athletic	2016–17	Championship	1	0	—		—		—		1	0
Wigan Athletic	2017–18	League One	0	0	—		2	1	1	0	3	1
Wigan Athletic	Total		1	0	—		2	1	1	0	4	1
Bury (loan)	2017–18	League One	22	1	0	0	—		—		22	1
Shrewsbury Town	2018–19	League One	42	2	7	2	1	0	1	0	51	4
Shrewsbury Town	2019–20	League One	31	2	7	2	0	0	4	0	42	4
Shrewsbury Town	Total		73	4	14	4	1	0	5	0	93	8
Reading	2020–21	Championship	45	3	0	0	1	0	—		46	3
Reading	2021–22	Championship	41	2	1	0	0	0	—		42	2
Reading	Total		86	5	1	0	1	0	—		88	5
Stoke City	2022–23	Championship	32	4	3	1	1	0	—		36	5
Stoke City	2023–24	Championship	37	1	0	0	3	2	—		40	3
Stoke City	2024–25	Championship	3	0	—		1	0	—		4	0
Stoke City	Total		72	5	3	1	5	2	—		80	8
Burnley	2024–25	Championship	42	2	2	0	—		—		44	2
Burnley	2025–26	Premier League	33	1	2	1	1	0	—		36	2
Burnley	2026–27	Championship	14	1	0	0	2	0	—		16	1
Burnley	Total		89	4	4	1	3	0	—		96	5
Career total			390	20	24	6	14	3	9	0	437	29

== Honours ==
Individual

- Reading Player of the Season: 2020–21
