= Frank Fielding =

English footballer (born 1988)

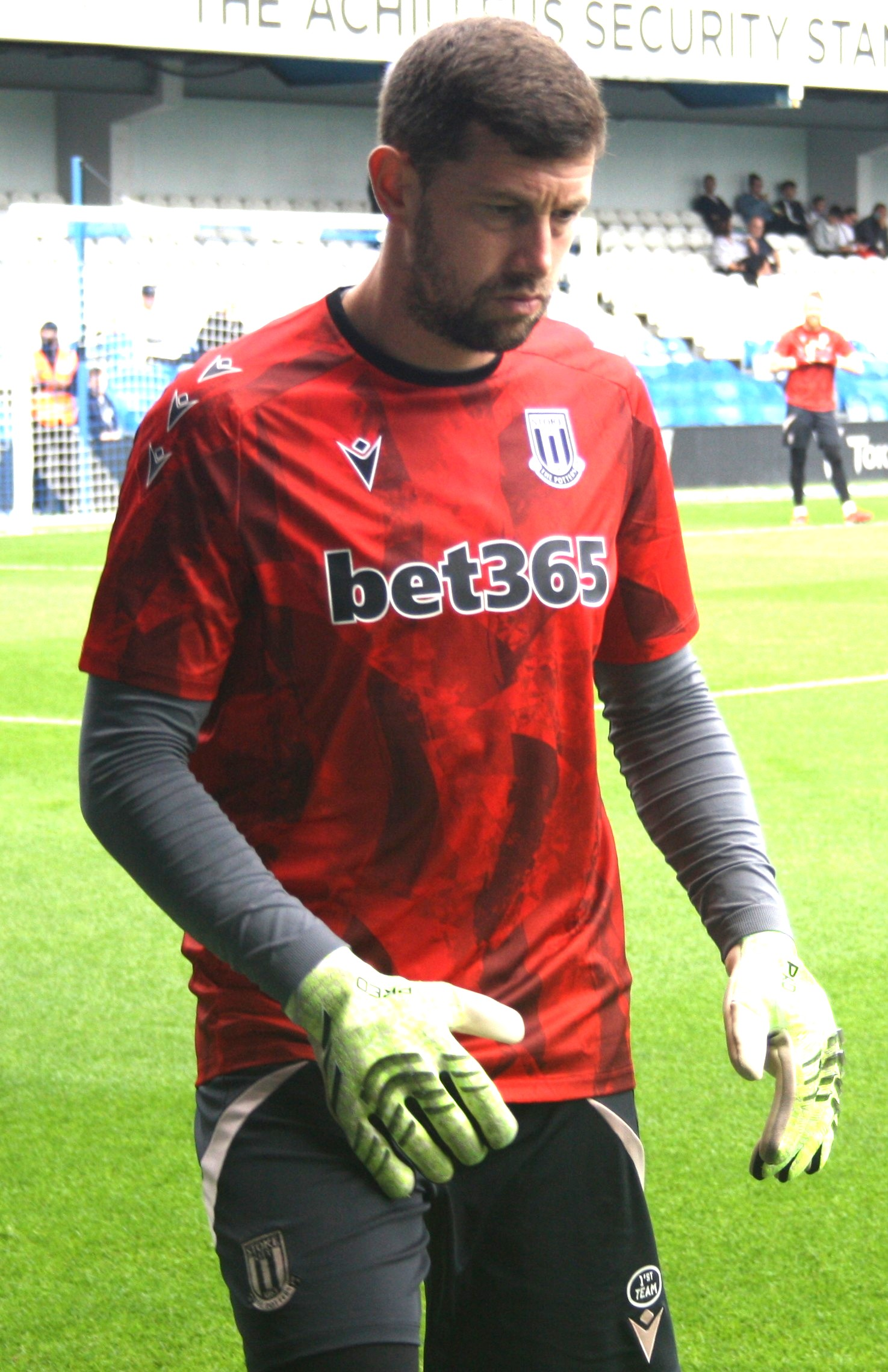
- Frank Fielding in 2025.

Personal information
- Full name: Francis David Fielding
- Date of birth: 4 April 1988 (age 38)
- Place of birth: Blackburn, England
- Height: 5 ft 11 in (1.80 m)
- Position: Goalkeeper

Team information
- Current team: Stoke City
- Number: 34

Youth career
- 2004–2007: Blackburn Rovers

Senior career*
Years	Team	Apps	(Gls)
2007–2011	Blackburn Rovers	0	(0)
2007	→ Wycombe Wanderers (loan)	15	(0)
2008	→ Wycombe Wanderers (loan)	21	(0)
2008	→ Northampton Town (loan)	12	(0)
2009	→ Rochdale (loan)	23	(0)
2009	→ Leeds United (loan)	0	(0)
2010	→ Rochdale (loan)	18	(0)
2010	→ Derby County (loan)	10	(0)
2011	→ Derby County (loan)	6	(0)
2011–2013	Derby County	60	(0)
2013–2019	Bristol City	158	(0)
2019–2021	Millwall	1	(0)
2021–	Stoke City	0	(0)
2022	→ Salford City (loan)	2	(0)

International career
2007	England U19	2	(0)
2008–2011	England U21	12	(0)
- * Club domestic league appearances and goals as of 17:59, 30 March 2022 (UTC)

Francis David Fielding (born 4 April 1988) is an English professional footballer who plays as a goalkeeper for EFL Championship club Stoke City.

He began his career at Blackburn Rovers in the Premier League. He spent time on loan at Wycombe Wanderers, Northampton Town, Rochdale, Leeds United, and Derby County, before making a permanent move to Derby County. In 2013, he signed for Bristol City, spending six years with the club until 2019. Since then he has been back-up goalkeeper at Millwall and Stoke City.

Fielding has played internationally for England twice at under-19 and twelve times at under-21 level.

== Club career ==
=== Blackburn Rovers ===
Born in Blackburn, Lancashire, Fielding is a product of Blackburn Rovers Academy. He joined League Two side Wycombe Wanderers on 28 September 2007 on a three-month loan deal alongside Bolton Wanderers' Polish goalkeeper Przemysław Kazimierczak. The deal was made due to Wycombe having injury problems with both first team goalkeepers Scott Shearer and Jamie Young. Fielding made his debut a day after signing on loan, keeping a clean sheet in a 1–0 win at Bradford City. His loan was extended until the end of the season on 10 January 2008 and he managed to keep his place after the return to fitness of Young. He then joined Northampton Town on loan for three months on 9 September where he made 12 appearances before returning to Blackburn. Fielding moved out on loan again, this time to Rochdale on 6 January 2009, where he starred before eventually featuring in an unsuccessful playoff attempt, losing to Gillingham in the semi-finals. On 2 February, Fielding extended his stay with Rochdale until the end of the 2008–09 season.

On 29 September 2009, Fielding joined Leeds United on a one-month emergency loan to cover for the injured Shane Higgs. He was named as an unused substitute in Leeds' game against Carlisle. After being unable to displace Casper Ankergren, On 26 October, Leeds announced they would not be renewing his loan and he returned to Blackburn. On 1 February 2010, Fielding returned to Rochdale on loan until the end of the 2009–10 season and made his debut in the 1–0 defeat at Bury, eventually helping Rochdale to a third-place finish and promotion to League One.

Fielding again started the 2010–11 season out of the first team picture as Paul Robinson's understudy. He was linked with a move to Championship side Derby County. The interest caused Fielding to issue a "come-and-get-me" plea, stating "It is the worst feeling when you are training all week and not playing - so if anyone wants me on loan, I'm available!" He joined Derby on a four-week emergency loan on 15 October 2010 and went straight into the squad for the home match against Preston North End the next day, keeping a clean sheet on his debut as the team ran out 3–0 winners. The loan was extended for an additional month on 13 November, after his seven appearances had reaped three clean sheets and 15 points from a possible 21 as Derby moved to fourth in the table. After Stephen Bywater returned from his wrist injury, Fielding returned to Blackburn in December. He was then named on the subs bench for Blackburn to cover from Mark Bunn when Paul Robinson picked up an injury. In February 2011, after Bywater and Saul Deeney picked up injuries, Fielding returned to Derby on loan. Though the deal was initially announced as being until the end of the 2010–11 season, Fielding's two month emergency loan deal with the club in October and November meant that he could only remain at the club for an additional month, with his second stay ending after the away fixture at Crystal Palace on 19 March 2011, though Fielding would train with the Derby squad for the remainder of the season.

Having left Derby 7th in the table, Fielding returned to the club in 19th after it had claimed only six points from the thirteen fixtures since his departure. In his first five games back at Derby, Fielding kept two clean sheets helping The Rams to an important wins against Sheffield United and Swansea City and draws with Barnsley and Crystal Palace. The 8 points from six games played in Fielding's second loan spell, came in stark contrast to the mere six point return from the 12 games since Fielding's previous loan spell finished.

=== Derby County ===
On 9 May 2011, it was announced that Fielding had signed a three-year deal with Derby, for a fee of £400,000. On 17 September 2011, Fielding was sent off after 67 seconds in the East Midlands derby match against Nottingham Forest, despite this Derby still won the match 2–1. Fielding featured in every minute of Derby's first team action since the game he missed against Millwall in September 2011 but this run was ended on 21 April 2012, in the penultimate game at Portsmouth when Fielding was substituted off at half-time due to a groin injury, which ruled him out of the final game of the season at home to Peterborough United. Fielding kept 12 clean sheets in the 47 games he played in during the 2011–12 season and finished 3rd in the fans Player of the Season vote.

Fielding started the first ten games 2012–13 season, keeping his 1st clean sheet against local rivals Nottingham Forest, resulting in a 1–0 victory at the City Ground. Fielding missed the game against Brighton & Hove Albion on 6 October 2012 due to a groin injury. Clough was hopeful that Fielding would return for the game against former club Blackburn Rovers on 20 October 2012. However, Fielding was ruled out for a further month. Fielding returned to the first team squad 17 November however, Fielding had to be content with a place on the substitutes bench as he lost his place in the first team to Adam Legzdins. Therefore, Fielding was limited to playing as an overage goalkeeper in the under-21 league, Clough did praise Fielding and said he was getting closer to regaining his place. In March 2013, Fielding regained his place in the starting eleven in Derby's 2–1 win against Leicester City after a 30-game absence lasting five and a half months. In April 2013 five weeks after his return, Fielding was sent off for a professional foul in Derby's 3–1 win against Peterborough United, Fielding's second red card for Derby After Derby signed Burnley keeper Lee Grant in May, Fielding was made available for transfer with a year left on his contract. In June, Derby accepted a transfer bid of £200,000 for Fielding from Bristol City.

=== Bristol City ===
On 26 June 2013, Fielding joined Bristol City, who had just been relegated to League One. He made his debut on 3 August 2013, in a 2–2 draw against Bradford City. The club made a disastrous start to the season, winning just four points from their opening eight games as Fielding conceded nineteen goals. He was subsequently replaced as first choice 'keeper by Elliot Parish. Fielding played in all of the Robins 58 fixtures in 2014–15 helping them to the League One title and victory in the 2015 Football League Trophy final. His performances during the season earned him a place on the League One PFA Team of the Year. He signed a new contract with Bristol City in August 2015. He missed most of the 2016–17 season due to having surgery on an ankle ligament injury. After being a regular in 2017–18, he lost his place to Niki Mäenpää in 2018–19 and was released at the end of the season.

=== Millwall ===
On 28 June 2019, Fielding joined Millwall. He made his debut on 3 August 2019 but was replaced in the 43rd minute of Millwall's 1–0 opening day victory against Preston North End due to injury. Fielding spent two seasons at Millwall as back-up to Bartosz Białkowski and was released in June 2021.

=== Stoke City ===
On 1 December 2021, Fielding joined Stoke City on a short-term contract to provide cover following an injury to Josef Bursik. In January 2022, Fielding signed a contract extension keeping him at the club for the remainder of the 2021–22 season. On 25 March 2022, Fielding joined Salford City on a seven-day emergency loan. Fielding signed a one-year contract with Stoke for the 2022–23 season. He remained with Stoke in 2023–24 and signed another one-year deal in May 2024. Fielding played his first game for Stoke on 13 August 2024, keeping a clean sheet in a 2–0 EFL Cup victory at Carlisle United. His contract was extended in May 2025 for another year, and again in May 2026.

== International career ==
Fielding was capped twice by the England under-19s, playing in games against the Netherlands and Czech Republic in May 2007. He made his England under-21 debut on 18 November 2008, replacing the injured Joe Lewis in the 33rd minute at Bramall Lane against the Czech Republic. Fielding received his first England call-up on 10 August 2010 for the friendly against Hungary, after Ben Foster withdrew from the squad. England won the match 2–1, with Fielding an unused substitute. Fielding was called up to the under-21 squad for the 2011 UEFA European Under-21 Championship. Although Fielding was 23 at the time of his call up, he was under 21 when the qualification phase began, making him eligible for the tournament. Fielding played the full 90 minutes of a pre-tournament friendly against the Norway under-21s on 5 June, keeping a clean sheet as England won 2–0.

== Career statistics ==
As of match played 13 August 2024

Appearances and goals by club, season and competition
Club	Season	League			FA Cup		League Cup		Other		Total	
Club	Season	Division	Apps	Goals	Apps	Goals	Apps	Goals	Apps	Goals	Apps	Goals
Blackburn Rovers	2007–08	Premier League	0	0	0	0	0	0	—		0	0
Blackburn Rovers	2008–09	Premier League	0	0	0	0	0	0	—		0	0
Blackburn Rovers	2009–10	Premier League	0	0	0	0	0	0	—		0	0
Blackburn Rovers	2010–11	Premier League	0	0	0	0	0	0	—		0	0
Blackburn Rovers	Total		0	0	0	0	0	0	—		0	0
Wycombe Wanderers (loan)	2007–08	League Two	36	0	1	0	0	0	2 (Note: Appearances in League Two play-offs)	0	39	0
Northampton Town (loan)	2008–09	League One	12	0	2	0	1	0	0	0	15	0
Rochdale (loan)	2008–09	League Two	23	0	0	0	0	0	2	0	25	0
Leeds United (loan)	2009–10	League One	0	0	0	0	0	0	0	0	0	0
Rochdale (loan)	2009–10	League Two	18	0	0	0	0	0	0	0	18	0
Derby County (loan)	2010–11	Championship	16	0	0	0	0	0	—		0	0
Derby County	2011–12	Championship	44	0	2	0	1	0	—		47	0
Derby County	2012–13	Championship	16	0	0	0	1	0	—		17	0
Derby County	Total		76	0	2	0	2	0	—		80	0
Bristol City	2013–14	League One	16	0	0	0	1	0	1 (Note: Appearance(s) in Football League Trophy)	0	18	0
Bristol City	2014–15	League One	46	0	5	0	1	0	6	0	58	0
Bristol City	2015–16	Championship	21	0	1	0	0	0	—		22	0
Bristol City	2016–17	Championship	27	0	2	0	1	0	—		30	0
Bristol City	2017–18	Championship	43	0	0	0	3	0	—		46	0
Bristol City	2018–19	Championship	5	0	2	0	0	0	—		7	0
Bristol City	Total		158	0	10	0	6	0	7	0	181	0
Millwall	2019–20	Championship	1	0	0	0	0	0	—		1	0
Millwall	2020–21	Championship	0	0	2	0	0	0	—		2	0
Millwall	Total		1	0	2	0	0	0	0	0	3	0
Stoke City	2021–22	Championship	0	0	0	0	0	0	—		0	0
Stoke City	2022–23	Championship	0	0	0	0	0	0	—		0	0
Stoke City	2023–24	Championship	0	0	0	0	0	0	—		0	0
Stoke City	2024–25	Championship	0	0	0	0	1	0	—		1	0
Stoke City	2025–26	Championship	0	0	0	0	0	0	—		0	0
Stoke City	2026–27	Championship	0	0	0	0	0	0	—		0	0
Stoke City	Total		0	0	0	0	1	0	—		1	0
Salford City (loan)	2021–22	League Two	2	0	0	0	0	0	—		2	0
Career total			326	0	17	0	10	0	11	0	364	0

== Honours ==
Rochdale

- Football League Two third-place promotion: 2009–10

Bristol City

- Football League One: 2014–15
- Football League Trophy: 2014–15

Individual

- PFA Team of the Year: 2014–15 League One
