= Bae Jun-ho =

South Korean footballer (born 2003)

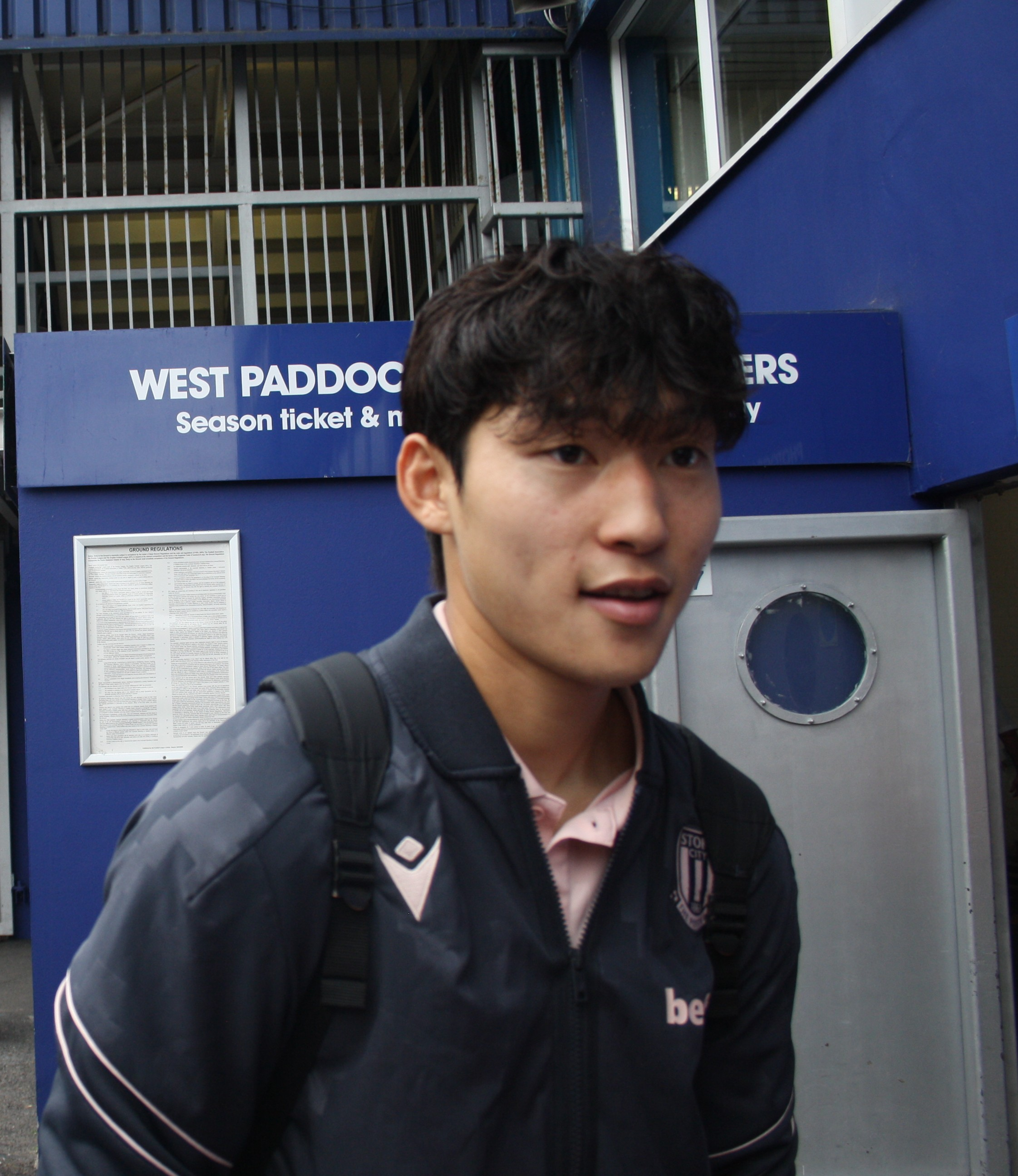
- Bae Jun-ho with Stoke City in 2025.

Personal information
- Date of birth: 21 August 2003 (age 23)
- Place of birth: Daegu, South Korea
- Height: 1.80 m (5 ft 11 in)
- Positions: Attacking midfielder; left winger

Team information
- Current team: Stoke City
- Number: 10

Youth career
- 2013–2014: Daegu FC (Note: Played for Daegu FC U12 in 2013, and Daegu Sinheung Elementary School in 2014, which were academies of Daegu FC.)
- 2015–2016: Daegu Banyawol Elementary School
- 2016–2019: Daeryun Middle School
- 2019–2021: Cheonan Jeil High School
- 2021: Pyeongtaek Jinwee

Senior career*
Years	Team	Apps	(Gls)
2022	Daejeon Hana Citizen B	17	(5)
2022–2023	Daejeon Hana Citizen	25	(3)
2023–	Stoke City	133	(7)

International career^{‡}
2022–2023	South Korea U20	21	(5)
2024–	South Korea U23	8	(1)
2024–	South Korea	13	(2)
Medal record
Men's football
Representing South Korea
Asian Games
Gold medal – first place	2026 Aichi–Nagoya
WAFF U-23 Championship
Winner	2024 Saudi Arabia
- * Club domestic league appearances and goals as of 20:34, 21 November 2026 (UTC) ‡ National team caps and goals as of 3 October 2026 (UTC)

- Bae Jun-ho
- Hangul: 배준호
- Hanja: 裵峻浩
- RR: Bae Junho
- MR: Pae Chunho
- IPA: [pɛ.d͡ʑun.ɦo]

Bae Jun-ho (Korean: 배준호; born 21 August 2003) is a South Korean professional footballer who plays as an attacking midfielder or left winger for EFL Championship club Stoke City and the South Korea national team.

Bae began his professional career with Daejeon Hana Citizen, helping them gain promotion to K League 1 in the 2022 season. After impressing in his debut season in the Korean top flight and for the South Korea U20 team, he moved to European football with English Championship club Stoke City in August 2023.

== Club career ==
=== Daejeon Hana Citizen ===
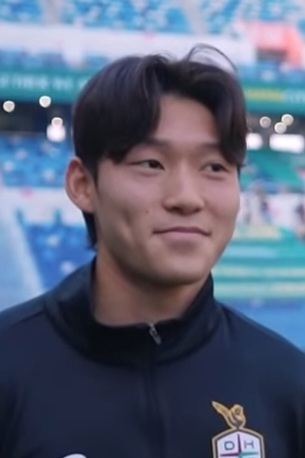
Bae Jun-ho with Daejeon Hana Citizen in 2023.

Bae started his career in the academy of Daegu FC. Afterwards, he attended Daegu Banyawol Elementary School, Daeryun Middle School, Cheonan Jeil High School and Jinwee High School. While playing for Pyeongtaek Jinwee, the football club of Jinwee High School, he was considered one of his country's best talents. In January 2022, following interest from a number of clubs across Europe, as well as former club Daegu, he signed for K League 2 side Daejeon Hana Citizen. He made eleven appearances in his first season with Daejeon as he helped his team win the promotion play-offs against Gimcheon Sangmu. In the 2023 season, Bae received more playing time in K League 1, as he continued his integration into the squad from the reserve team. On 27 August 2023, Daejeon officially announced that they had reached an agreement with EFL Championship side Stoke City for the transfer of Bae on a permanent deal.

=== Stoke City ===
On 31 August 2023, Bae joined Stoke City for an undisclosed fee on a four-year contract. He scored his first goal in English football on 24 February 2024 in a 2–1 defeat against Cardiff City and followed this up a week later in a 2–0 victory against Middlesbrough. In the 2023–24 season, Bae made 40 appearances as Stoke successfully avoided relegation, finishing in 17th position. He was named the club's Player of the Year in his first season at Stoke City. In the 2024–25 season Bae was a regular starter under three different managers, playing 49 times as Stoke avoided relegation on the final day. Bae was again a regular in 2025–26 under Mark Robins, making 45 appearances but he came in for criticism for his lack of goals and assists.

== International career ==
After representing South Korea at under-19 level in a number of friendlies, Bae was called up to the under-20 squad for the 2023 AFC U-20 Asian Cup qualification. Having scored in two qualifiers against Mongolia and Malaysia, he was called up to the 2023 AFC U-20 Asian Cup. Although South Korea failed to win the tournament by being knocked out in the semi-finals by Uzbekistan, Bae was still praised for his performances.

Bae was called up to the under-20 squad for the 2023 FIFA U-20 World Cup. He started quietly in the tournament, but South Korea finished fourth under his influence. When he scored one and provided an assist in a 3–2 victory against Ecuador, Ecuadorian manager Miguel Bravo described him as a "Brazilian". Italian manager Carmine Nunziata defeated South Korea in the semi-finals, but he was also attracted to Bae's performance.

On 6 June 2024, Bae scored a goal in a FIFA World Cup qualifier against Singapore, where he made his senior international debut. In May 2026, he was selected for the South Korea squad for the 2026 FIFA World Cup. However, he was injured by Molik Khan's unsportsmanlike tackle in a 5–0 friendly win over Trinidad and Tobago on 30 May, and stayed on the bench throughout the tournament.

== Style of play ==
An attacking midfielder who is comfortable using both feet, Bae has been regarded for his passing range and dribbling, as well as his balance and stamina.

== Personal life ==
Bae has cited fellow South Korean Hwang In-beom, as well as Kevin De Bruyne, as his biggest footballing role-models.

== Career statistics ==
=== Club ===
As of matches played 21 November 2026

Appearances and goals by club, season and competition
Club	Season	League			National cup (Note: Appearances in the FA Cup and Korean FA Cup)		League cup (Note: Appearances in the EFL Cup)		Other		Total	
Club	Season	Division	Apps	Goals	Apps	Goals	Apps	Goals	Apps	Goals	Apps	Goals
Daejeon Hana Citizen B	2022	K4 League	17	5	—		—		—		17	5
Daejeon Hana Citizen	2022	K League 2	8	1	1	0	—		2 (Note: Appearances in K League 2 promotion play-offs)	0	11	1
Daejeon Hana Citizen	2023	K League 1	17	2	0	0	—		—		17	2
Daejeon Hana Citizen	Total		25	3	1	0	—		2	0	28	3
Stoke City	2023–24	Championship	38	2	1	0	1	0	—		40	2
Stoke City	2024–25	Championship	45	3	2	0	2	0	—		49	3
Stoke City	2025–26	Championship	42	2	2	1	1	0	—		45	3
Stoke City	2026–27	Championship	8	0	0	0	1	0	—		9	0
Stoke City	Total		133	7	5	1	5	0	—		143	8
Career total			175	15	6	1	5	0	2	0	188	16

=== International ===
As of match played 30 May 2026

Appearances and goals by national team and year
National team	Year	Apps	Goals
South Korea
South Korea	2024	6	2
South Korea	2025	5	0
South Korea	2026	2	0
Career total		13	2

Scores and results list South Korea's goal tally first.

List of international goals scored by Bae Jun-ho
No.	Date	Venue	Opponent	Score	Result	Competition
1	6 June 2024	National Stadium, Kallang, Singapore	Singapore	6–0	7–0	2026 FIFA World Cup qualification
2	14 November 2024	Jaber Al-Ahmad International Stadium, Kuwait City, Kuwait	Kuwait	3–1	3–1	2026 FIFA World Cup qualification

== Honours ==
South Korea U23

- WAFF U-23 Championship: 2024
- Asian Games: 2026

Individual

- K League All-Star: 2023
- Stoke City Player of the Year: 2023–24
