= Tyrese Campbell =

English footballer (born 1999)

Personal information
- Full name: Tyrese Kai Campbell
- Date of birth: 28 December 1999 (age 26)
- Place of birth: Cheadle Hulme, England
- Height: 1.83 m (6 ft 0 in)
- Position: Forward

Team information
- Current team: Sheffield United
- Number: 23

Youth career
- 2014–2016: Manchester City
- 2016–2018: Stoke City

Senior career*
Years	Team	Apps	(Gls)
2018–2024	Stoke City	146	(31)
2019	→ Shrewsbury Town (loan)	15	(5)
2024–	Sheffield United	78	(16)

International career
2015	England U17	3	(0)
2019	England U20	2	(2)
- * Club domestic league appearances and goals as of 22:31, 21 November 2026 (UTC)

Tyrese Kai Campbell (born 28 December 1999) is an English professional footballer who plays as a forward for EFL Championship club Sheffield United.

Previously a youth player at Manchester City, he began his senior career at Stoke City, where he played 164 games and scored 36 goals. In 2024, at the end of his contract, he transferred to Sheffield United.

== Early life ==
Campbell was born in Cheadle Hulme, Greater Manchester and attended the private Cheadle Hulme School. His father Kevin (1970–2024) played for Arsenal, Everton, Nottingham Forest and West Bromwich Albion.

== Club career ==
=== Stoke City ===
Campbell began his career with Manchester City's Academy before turning down the chance to turn professional with the club in the summer of 2016. He instead signed a contract with Stoke City with a fee of £1.75 million being set at a tribunal. He was a prolific goalscorer with Stoke under-18s in 2016–17 as he helped them reach the FA Youth Cup semi-final. He was promoted to train with the first team in February 2018 after impressing manager Paul Lambert in training.

Campbell made his professional debut on 24 February 2018 in a 1–1 draw at Leicester City in the Premier League. He made a further three substitute appearances towards the end of the 2017–18 season as Stoke were relegated to the EFL Championship. He made his first start for Stoke on 15 January 2019 in a FA Cup match against Shrewsbury Town, scoring twice in a 3–2 defeat.

On 31 January 2019, Campbell was loaned to Shrewsbury for the remainder of the EFL League One season. He made his debut two days later in a 3–0 home loss to Luton Town, in which he started and was substituted for Stefan Payne after 63 minutes. He scored his first league goal on 16 February, opening a 1–1 home draw with Burton Albion. He played 15 times for the Shrews, scoring five goals and helping them secure League One safety. His performances for Shrewsbury earned him the EFL Young Player of the Month award for February 2019.

Campbell scored his first Championship goal on 19 October 2019 in a 2–0 win against Fulham. He made little impact under Nathan Jones, mainly used as a substitute. Following the arrival of Michael O'Neill in November 2019, he worked his way back into the side and scored vital goals against Sheffield Wednesday, Huddersfield Town and West Bromwich Albion, helping Stoke move out the relegation zone at the turn of the new year.

Campbell signed a new four-and-a-half-year contract with Stoke on 24 January 2020, after turning down offers from a number of other clubs. The season extended into June due to the COVID-19 pandemic and he played in all the remaining matches and scored twice against relegation rivals Barnsley on 4 July 2020. He ended the campaign with nine goals from 37 appearances as Stoke avoided relegation and finished in 15th position.

Campbell began the 2020–21 season in good form, scoring the winning goal against Brentford on 24 October 2020, and scoring twice in a 4–3 victory against Huddersfield Town on 21 November. By the beginning of December, he had scored seven goals and provided five assists in 19 appearances. A knee injury against Cardiff City on 8 December ended his season.

Campbell was out for ten months, returning against Bournemouth on 19 October 2022. He struggled to regain his form in the 2021–22 season, scoring five goals in 30 appearances. In the 2022–23 season, He scored nine goals in 44 appearances as Stoke finished in 16th. In the 2023–24 season, he scored only four goals in 24 appearances, two of which came in the final two games of the season which secured Stoke's Championship status. Following the end of the campaign Stoke announced that his contract would not be renewed.

=== Sheffield United ===
Campbell joined Sheffield United on 11 August 2024, signing a three-year contract. He scored his first goal for the Blades on 26 October in a 2–0 home win over his former club Stoke; Stoke City condemned a "small minority" of their fans for chanting about the recent death of Campbell's father. Campbell was named EFL Championship Player of the Month for March 2025 having scored in four out of five matches. He scored in the 2025 EFL Championship play-off final to put Sheffield United 1–0 up against Sunderland, who came back to win 2–1.

On 14 August 2026, Campbell signed a new contract extension with Sheffield United, committing his future to the club until the summer of 2028.

== International career ==
Having previously represented England at U16 and U17 level, Campbell received his first call-up for the U20 squad on 8 November 2019. He scored twice in a 4–0 victory over Portugal in the U20 Elite League on 14 November 2019.

== Career statistics ==
As of match played 8 September 2026

Appearances and goals by club, season and competition
Club	Season	League			FA Cup		EFL Cup		Other		Total	
Club	Season	Division	Apps	Goals	Apps	Goals	Apps	Goals	Apps	Goals	Apps	Goals
Stoke City U23	2016–17	—	—		—		—		1 (Note: Appearance(s) in EFL Trophy)	0	1	0
Stoke City U23	2017–18	—	—		—		—		3	0	3	0
Stoke City U23	2018–19	—	—		—		—		4	2	4	2
Stoke City U23	Total		—		—		—		8	2	8	2
Stoke City	2017–18	Premier League	4	0	0	0	0	0	—		4	0
Stoke City	2018–19	Championship	3	0	2	2	1	0	—		6	2
Stoke City	2019–20	Championship	33	9	1	0	3	0	—		37	9
Stoke City	2020–21	Championship	16	6	0	0	3	1	—		19	7
Stoke City	2021–22	Championship	26	4	3	1	1	0	—		30	5
Stoke City	2022–23	Championship	41	9	2	0	1	0	—		44	9
Stoke City	2023–24	Championship	23	3	0	0	1	1	—		24	4
Stoke City	Total		146	31	8	3	10	2	—		164	36
Shrewsbury Town (loan)	2018–19	League One	15	5	0	0	0	0	—		15	5
Sheffield United	2024–25	Championship	33	10	0	0	1	0	3 (Note: Appearances in EFL Championship play-offs)	1	37	11
Sheffield United	2025–26	Championship	34	6	0	0	1	0	0	0	35	6
Sheffield United	2026–27	Championship	5	0	0	0	1	0	0	0	6	0
Sheffield United	Total		72	16	0	0	3	0	3	1	78	17
Career total			233	52	8	3	13	2	11	3	265	60

== Honours ==
Individual

- EFL Championship Player of the Month: March 2025
