= Nikola Jojić =

Serbian footballer (born 2003)

Personal information
- Full name: Nikola Jojić
- Date of birth: 15 September 2003 (age 23)
- Place of birth: Čačak, Serbia and Montenegro
- Height: 1.83 m (6 ft 0 in)
- Positions: Attacking midfielder; winger

Team information
- Current team: Start
- Number: 8

Youth career
- Mladost Lučani

Senior career*
Years	Team	Apps	(Gls)
2020–2023	Mladost Lučani	44	(9)
2023–2026	Stoke City	1	(0)
2024–2025	→ Mladost Lučani (loan)	12	(1)
2025	→ Gorica (loan)	3	(0)
2025–2026	→ Radomlje (loan)	31	(8)
2026–	Start	0	(0)

International career
2022	Serbia U19	3	(0)
2023–	Serbia U21	1	(0)
- * Club domestic league appearances and goals as of 11:21, 22 August 2026 (UTC)

Nikola Jojić (Serbian Cyrillic: Никола Јојић; born 15 September 2003) is a Serbian professional footballer who plays as an attacking midfielder or winger for Start.

== Career ==
=== Mladost Lučani ===
Jojić was born in Čačak and began his career with Mladost Lučani, making his Serbian SuperLiga debut at the age of 16 on 24 July 2021 against Red Star Belgrade. He scored his first professional goals in a 2–1 win against Spartak Subotica on 20 May 2022. Jojić had a break-out season in 2022–23 as he was fully integrated into the first team and went on score eight goals in 38 appearances.

=== Stoke City ===
On 22 August 2023, Jojić signed for Championship club Stoke City on a four-year deal for an undisclosed fee. He made his league debut in England coming on as a late substitute against Preston North End on 2 September 2023. Jojić spent the rest of the 2023–24 season with the under-21 team without making much of an impact.

After struggling for game time with the under-21 team Jojić returned to Mladost Lučani for the 2024–25 season. After making 14 appearances back at Mladost, Jojić moved on to Croatian Football League side Gorica in February 2025 on loan for the remainder of the 2024–25 season. Jojić only made three appearances for Gorica. In July 2025 he joined Slovenian PrvaLiga side Radomlje on loan. He played 34 times for Radomlje, scoring nine goals as they finished in sixth position. His contract at Stoke was terminated by mutual consent in July 2026.

=== IK Start ===
In August 2026, Jojić signed for Norwegian Eliteserien side Start.

== Career statistics ==
As of match played 17 May 2026

Appearances and goals by club, season and competition
Club	Season	League			National cup (Note: Includes Serbian Cup)		League cup (Note: Includes EFL Cup)		Other		Total	
Club	Season	Division	Apps	Goals	Apps	Goals	Apps	Goals	Apps	Goals	Apps	Goals
Mladost Lučani	2021–22	Serbian SuperLiga	5	2	0	0	—		—		5	2
Mladost Lučani	2022–23	Serbian SuperLiga	37	7	1	1	—		—		38	8
Mladost Lučani	2023–24	Serbian SuperLiga	2	0	0	0	—		—		2	0
Mladost Lučani	Total		44	9	1	1	—		—		45	10
Stoke City	2023–24	EFL Championship	1	0	0	0	1	0	—		2	0
Stoke City	2024–25	EFL Championship	0	0	0	0	0	0	—		0	0
Stoke City	2025–26	EFL Championship	0	0	0	0	0	0	—		0	0
Stoke City	Total		1	0	0	0	1	0	—		2	0
Mladost Lučani (loan)	2024–25	Serbian SuperLiga	12	1	2	0	—		—		14	1
Gorica (loan)	2024–25	Croatian Football League	3	0	0	0	—		—		3	0
Radomlje (loan)	2025–26	Slovenian PrvaLiga	31	8	3	1	—		—		34	9
Start	2026	Eliteserien	0	0	0	0	—		—		0	0
Career total			91	18	6	2	1	0	0	0	98	20

== Honours ==
Individual

- Serbian SuperLiga Player of the Week: 2021–22 (Round 37)
