= Jacob Holland-Wilkinson =

English footballer (born 2002)

Personal information
- Full name: Jacob Holland-Wilkinson
- Date of birth: 30 October 2002 (age 23)
- Place of birth: Bury, England
- Height: 1.78 m (5 ft 10 in)
- Position: Forward

Team information
- Current team: Ramsbottom United

Youth career
- Preston North End

Senior career*
Years	Team	Apps	(Gls)
2020–2022	Preston North End	0	(0)
2021–2022	→ AFC Fylde (loan)	?	(?)
2021–2022	→ Bamber Bridge F.C. (loan)	?	(?)
2022–2023	Stoke City F.C.	0	(0)
2022–2023	→ Lancaster City F.C.	6	(0)
2022–2023	→ Stoke City F.C. Under-21s	16	(4)
2023–2024	Lancaster City F.C.	21	(3)
2023-2024	Athletic De Brave U21	10	(11)
2023–2024	Bury F.C.	10	(4)
2023–2025	Chorley	0	(0)
2024–2025	→ Widnes F.C. (loan)	?	(?)
2024–2025	→ Lancaster City F.C. (loan)	4	(0)
2025-	Ramsbottom United	20	(15)
- * Club domestic league appearances and goals

Jacob Holland-Wilkinson (born 30 October 2002) is an English semi-professional footballer who plays as a forward for North West Counties Football League club Ramsbottom United.

== Career ==
Holland-Wilkinson started his career in the Preston North End academy at the age of 14. During his time there, he was loaned out to AFC Fylde and Bamber Bridge F.C. to gain experience, though he did not make any first-team appearances.

In 2022, Holland-Wilkinson was signed by Stoke City F.C., although he did not make any senior team appearances. He featured prominently in their Under-21 side, making 16 appearances and scoring 4 goals. During his time at Stoke, he was also loaned out to Lancaster City F.C., where he played 6 matches without scoring.

At the start of the 2023/2024 season, Holland-Wilkinson signed for Lancaster City F.C. where he was a consistent face in the starting XI making 21 appearances. He made the move to Bury F.C. on 16 January 2024 to "bolster the engine room" as the club entered the latter stage of the season.

On 2 August 2024, Chorley announced their signing of Holland-Wilkinson. He has since been loaned to Lancaster City F.C..

On 19 June 2025, Ramsbottom United signed Holland-Wilkinson.
