= Luke Badley-Morgan =

Jamaica association football player (born 2003)

Personal information
- Full name: Luke Bailey Badley-Morgan
- Date of birth: 22 October 2003 (age 23)
- Position: Defender

Youth career
- –2022: Chelsea
- 2022: Stoke City

Senior career*
Years	Team	Apps	(Gls)
2022–2025	Stoke City	0	(0)
2023–2024	→ Rushall Olympic (loan)	7	(1)
2024–2025	→ Airdrieonians (loan)	13	(0)

International career
2019	England U17	2	(0)
2022	Jamaica U20	5	(0)
- * Club domestic league appearances and goals as of 00:15 3 June 2025 (UTC)

Luke Bailey Badley-Morgan (born 22 October 2003) is a Jamaican footballer who plays as a defender.

== Early life ==
Badley-Morgan played youth football for Senrab F.C on Wanstead Flats before playing for the youth academy of Chelsea.

== Club career ==
A left-sided centre-back, in 2022 he left the academy at Chelsea and signed for Stoke City ahead of the 2022-23 season. In November 2023, he signed on loan for National League North side Rushall Olympic.

In August 2024, he joined Scottish Championship side Airdrieonians on loan. He made his debut that month for Airdrie in the Scottish Championship against Queens Park.

== International career ==
In June 2022, he was included in the Jamaica national under-20 football team squad for the CONCACAF Under-20 Championship. The following summer he was included in the Jamaica senior team's provisional squad for the 2023 CONCACAF Gold Cup.
