= 2026–27 Stoke City F.C. season =

English football club season

Stoke City
2026–27 season
- Chairman: John Coates
- Manager: Mark Robins
- Stadium: bet365 Stadium
- Championship: 4th
- EFL Cup: Second round
- Top goalscorer: League: Ethan Galbraith (3); All: Ethan Galbraith (3)
Home colours	Away colours	Third colours

The 2026–27 season is Stoke City's 110th season in the Football League, the 50th in the second tier and ninth consecutive in the Championship.

== Pre-season and friendlies ==
Stoke City have a new club crest for the 2026–27 season based on the one used from 1977 to 1992, featuring a bottle kiln, Staffordshire knot, foundation year and red and white stripes. Stoke confirmed their retained list on 14 May, departing the club were veteran midfielders Lewis Baker and Steven Nzonzi whilst Milan Smit loan move was made permanent. On 22 May Stuart Harvey was appointed as the clubs new technical director. On 9 June, Arsenal U21 head coach Max Porter, was appointed as assistant manager.

Stoke played pre-season friendlies against Braga, Crewe Alexandra, Everton, Sheffield Wednesday and Valencia.

10 July 2026 Friendly	Stoke City	0–1	Braga	Burton upon Trent
14:00 BST		Report	Tıknaz 84'	Stadium: St George's Park National Football Centre

18 July 2026 Friendly	Crewe Alexandra	1–1	Stoke City	Crewe
15:00 BST	Thibaut 76'	Report	Gallgher 43'	Stadium: Mornflake Stadium

25 July 2026 Friendly	Stoke City	2–0	Sheffield Wednesday	Vienna, Austria
13:00 BST	Gallagher 10'; Cissé 47'	Report		Stadium: ÖFB Campus

25 July 2026 Friendly	Stoke City	4–0	Sheffield Wednesday	Vienna, Austria
14:00 BST	Weaver 9' (o.g.); Smit 43', 47'; Rigo 51'	Report		Stadium: ÖFB Campus

28 July 2026 Friendly	Stoke City	1–0	Everton	Stoke-on-Trent
19:45 BST	Kelly 59'	Report		Stadium: bet365 Stadium

1 August 2026 Friendly	Stoke City	1–1	Valencia	Stoke-on-Trent
18:30 BST	Monferrer 55' (o.g.)	Report	Danjuma 12'	Stadium: bet365 Stadium

3 October 2026 Friendly	Stoke City	1–0	Notts County	Trent Vale
13:00 BST	Bombino	Report		Stadium: Clayton Wood Training Ground; Attendance: 0 (BCD)

== Championship ==
=== August ===
For the first game of the season against Swansea City, Mark Robins gave debuts to new signings Ethan Galbraith, Luke Graham and Svante Ingelsson. Despite Eric Bocat giving Stoke an early lead, Swansea produced a comeback win with goals from Joseph Opoku and Adam Idah. The first away match of the campaign was at Southampton with new signings George Hirst and Ben Johnson starting. The Saints took an early lead through Larin before Ethan Galbraith scored his first goal for Stoke. Southampton won the game late on with goals from last season's loanee Divin Mubama and a penalty from Ryan Manning. Despite taking an early lead against midlands rivals Wolverhampton Wanderers, Stoke went on to lose 4–1.

=== September ===
On transfer deadline day Stoke brought in left-back Luca Bombino, and midfielders Justin Devenny and Jack McGlynn, taking their net spend over the summer to over £30 million whilst Sorba Thomas moved on to Hull City for a 'significant' undisclosed fee. On the same day Stoke managed to claim their first win of the season, beating Norwich City 1–0. Four days later they claimed a comfortable 4–0 victory over Charlton Athletic with Devenny scoring twice on his debut whilst Hirst headed in his first goal for Stoke. Their away struggles continued at Cardiff City as after Ben Johnson had given Stoke the lead, Cardiff equalised though Joel Colwill and had a number of opportunities to score, hitting the post three times as Stoke hung on for a fortunate point. Stoke put a much better performance in their next away game at Watford ending their away game winless run with a 2–1 victory, new signing Jack McGlynn scoring his first goal for the club. They then came from a goal behind to beat Sheffield United 2–1 with a long range strike from McGlynn and a volley from Gallagher, moving Stoke up to seventh position going into the extended international break.

=== October ===
Following the break Stoke travelled to newly promoted Bolton Wanderers, managed by former manager Steven Schumacher. Stoke were reduced to ten men early into the match after Maksym Talovierov brought down Kyliane Dong. Despite this City came away with a 2–1 victory their first at Bolton's Toughsheet Community Stadium. Stoke's six game unbeaten run was ended by promotion favourites Middlesbrough, after twice coming from behind, a stoppage time goal from Neto Borges earned Boro a 3–2 win. Stoke then beat Derby County 1–0 with Luke Graham, scoring his first goal in English football. City then played out an uneventful goalless draw with Bristol City with the match played in stormy conditions. Stoke ended October with a comfortable 2–0 victory over bottom of the table Preston North End, with goals from Wilmot and McGlynn.

=== November ===
Stoke defeated Blackburn Rovers 2–1, with McGlynn scoring a long range free-kick and then an own goal by Moussa Baradji who bundled the ball past Balázs Tóth. Andri Guðjohnsen pulled one back for Rovers and also had a goal ruled out for a foul on Wilmot. Stoke made it five away wins in a row for the first time since 1947, after coming from behind to beat Portsmouth 2–1. Prior to the match against Birmingham City, tributes were paid to Peter Dobing and Gudjon Thordarson. Stoke won the match 1–0 with George Hirst slotting past James Beadle just after half-time though they had to defend the last 30 miniutes with ten men after Luca Bombino was shown a second yellow card for a clumsy foul on Patrick Roberts.

=== Matches ===
15 August 2026 1	Stoke City	1–2	Swansea City	Stoke-on-Trent
15:00 BST	Bocat 10'	Report	Opoku 22'; Idah 66'	Stadium: bet365 Stadium; Attendance: 24,332; Referee: Oliver Langford

22 August 2026 2	Southampton	3–1	Stoke City	Southampton
15:00 BST	Larin 8'; Mubama 89'; Manning 90+4'	Report	Galbraith 26'	Stadium: St Mary's Stadium; Attendance: 29,185; Referee: Steve Martin

29 August 2026 3	Wolverhampton Wanderers	4–1	Stoke City	Wolverhampton
12:30 BST	Gomes 19', 22'; Jiménez 55' (pen.); James 85'	Report	Gallagher 2'	Stadium: Molineux Stadium; Attendance: 30,334; Referee: Tom Nield
Note: Fixture was initially scheduled for a 15:00 kick-off, but was brought forward for live Sky Sports.

1 September 2026 4	Stoke City	1–0	Norwich City	Stoke-on-Trent
20:00 BST	Galbraith 13'	Report		Stadium: bet365 Stadium; Attendance: 20,140; Referee: Andrew Kitchen
Note: Fixture was initially scheduled for a 19:45 kick-off, but was pushed back for live Sky Sports.

5 September 2026 5	Stoke City	4–0	Charlton Athletic	Stoke-on-Trent
12:30 BST	Devenny 15' (pen.), 41'; Galbraith 22'; Hirst 25'	Report		Stadium: bet365 Stadium; Attendance: 21,071; Referee: Bobby Madley
Note: Fixture was initially scheduled for a 15:00 kick-off, but was brought forward for live Sky Sports.

8 September 2026 6	Cardiff City	1–1	Stoke City	Cardiff
19:45 BST	J. Colwill 63'	Report	Johnson 22'	Stadium: Cardiff City Stadium; Attendance: 18,088

12 September 2026 7	Watford	1–2	Stoke City	Watford
15:00 BST	Nabizada 90+1'	Report	McGlynn 45+4'; Bocat 57'	Stadium: Vicarage Road; Attendance: 18,296

19 September 2026 8	Stoke City	2–1	Sheffield United	Stoke-on-Trent
12:30 BST	McGlynn 78'; Gallagher 86'	Report	Phillips 51'	Stadium: bet365 Stadium; Attendance: 23,360; Referee: Tim Robinson
Note: Fixture was initially scheduled for a 15:00 kick-off, but was brought forward for live Sky Sports.

10 October 2026 9	Bolton Wanderers	1–2	Stoke City	Bolton
15:00 BST	Bair 90+2'	Report	Cissé 45+4'; Wilmot 62'	Stadium: Toughsheet Community Stadium; Attendance: 26,018

13 October 2026 10	Stoke City	2–3	Middlesbrough	Stoke-on-Trent
20:00 BST	Borges 50' (o.g.); Boženík 85'	Report	Brittain 48'; Lankshear 73'; Borges 90+1'	Stadium: bet365 Stadium; Attendance: 22,538
Note: Fixture was initially scheduled for a 19:45 kick-off, but was pushed back for live Sky Sports broadcasting.

17 October 2026 11	Derby County	0–1	Stoke City	Derby
15:00 BST		Report	Graham 49'	Stadium: Pride Park Stadium; Attendance: 28,814

24 October 2026 12	Stoke City	0–0	Bristol City	Stoke-on-Trent
15:00 BST		Report		Stadium: bet365 Stadium; Attendance: 22,390; Referee: James Bell

31 October 2026 13	Stoke City	2–0	Preston North End	Stoke-on-Trent
12:30 GMT	Wilmot 29'; McGlynn 53'	Report		Stadium: bet365 Stadium; Attendance: 21,772; Referee: Adam Herczeg
Note: Fixture was initially scheduled for a 15:00 kick-off, but was brought forward for live Sky Sports broadcasting.

3 November 2026 14	Blackburn Rovers	1–2	Stoke City	Blackburn
19:45 GMT	Guðjohnsen 87'	Report	McGlynn 43'; Baradji 68' (o.g.)	Stadium: Ewood Park; Attendance: 13,825

7 November 2026 15	Portsmouth	1–2	Stoke City	Portsmouth
12:30 GMT	Shade 6'	Report	McGlynn 43'; Wilmot 77'	Stadium: Fratton Park; Attendance: 20,306
Note: Fixture was initially scheduled for a 15:00 kick-off, but was brought forward for live Sky Sports broadcasting.

21 November 2026 16	Stoke City	1–0	Birmingham City	Stoke-on-Trent
15:00 GMT	Hirst 48'	Report		Stadium: bet365 Stadium; Attendance: 26,913

25 November 2026 17	Stoke City	v	Millwall	Stoke-on-Trent
20:00 GMT				Stadium: bet365 Stadium
Note: Fixture was initially scheduled for a 19:45 kick-off, but was pushed back for live Sky Sports broadcasting.

28 November 2026 18	West Ham United	v	Stoke City	Stratford, London
15:00 GMT				Stadium: London Stadium

5 December 2026 19	Stoke City	v	Queens Park Rangers	Stoke-on-Trent
15:00 GMT				Stadium: bet365 Stadium

9 December 2026 20	Lincoln City	v	Stoke City	Lincoln
19:45 GMT				Stadium: Sincil Bank

12 December 2026 21	Stoke City	v	West Bromwich Albion	Stoke-on-Trent
12:30 GMT				Stadium: bet365 Stadium
Note: Fixture was initially scheduled for a 15:00 kick-off, but was brought forward for live Sky Sports broadcasting.

19 December 2026 22	Burnley	v	Stoke City	Burnley
15:00 GMT				Stadium: Turf Moor

26 December 2026 23	Stoke City	v	Wrexham	Stoke-on-Trent
15:00 GMT				Stadium: bet365 Stadium

29 December 2026 24	Bristol City	v	Stoke City	Bristol
19:45 GMT				Stadium: Ashton Gate

1 January 2027 25	West Bromwich Albion	v	Stoke City	West Bromwich
15:00 GMT				Stadium: The Hawthorns

16 January 2027 26	Stoke City	v	Derby County	Stoke-on-Trent
12:30 GMT				Stadium: bet365 Stadium

23 January 2027 27	Preston North End	v	Stoke City	Preston
20:00 GMT				Stadium: Deepdale

26 January 2027 28	Stoke City	v	Blackburn Rovers	Stoke-on-Trent
19:45 GMT				Stadium: bet365 Stadium

30 January 2027 29	Stoke City	v	Portsmouth	Stoke-on-Trent
15:00 GMT				Stadium: bet365 Stadium

6 February 2027 30	Birmingham City	v	Stoke City	Birmingham
15:00 GMT				Stadium: St Andrew's

13 February 2027 31	Stoke City	v	Watford	Stoke-on-Trent
15:00 GMT				Stadium: bet365 Stadium

16 February 2027 32	Middlesbrough	v	Stoke City	Middlesbrough
19:45 GMT				Stadium: Riverside Stadium

20 February 2027 33	Sheffield United	v	Stoke City	Sheffield
12:30 GMT				Stadium: Bramall Lane

27 February 2027 34	Stoke City	v	Bolton Wanderers	Stoke-on-Trent
15:00 GMT				Stadium: bet365 Stadium

3 March 2027 35	Stoke City	v	Southampton	Stoke-on-Trent
19:45 GMT				Stadium: bet365 Stadium

6 March 2027 36	Swansea City	v	Stoke City	Swansea
15:00 GMT				Stadium: Swansea.com Stadium

13 March 2027 37	Stoke City	v	West Ham United	Stoke-on-Trent
15:00 GMT				Stadium: bet365 Stadium

16 March 2027 38	Queens Park Rangers	v	Stoke City	Shepherd's Bush, London
19:45 GMT				Stadium: Loftus Road

20 March 2027 39	Wrexham	v	Stoke City	Wrexham
15:00 GMT				Stadium: Racecourse Ground

3 April 2027 40	Stoke City	v	Burnley	Stoke-on-Trent
15:00 BST				Stadium: bet365 Stadium

6 April 2027 41	Stoke City	v	Cardiff City	Stoke-on-Trent
19:45 BST				Stadium: bet365 Stadium

10 April 2027 42	Charlton Athletic	v	Stoke City	Charlton, London
15: BST				Stadium: The Valley

17 April 2027 43	Stoke City	v	Wolverhampton Wanderers	Stoke-on-Trent
15:00 BST				Stadium: bet365 Stadium

20 April 2027 44	Norwich City	v	Stoke City	Norwich
19:45 BST				Stadium: Carrow Road

24 April 2027 45	Stoke City	v	Lincoln City	Stoke-on-Trent
15:00 BST				Stadium: bet365 Stadium

1 May 2027 46	Millwall	v	Stoke City	Bermondsey, London
12:30 BST				Stadium: The Den

=== League table ===
Pos	Team	Pld	W	D	L	GF	GA	GD	Pts	Promotion, qualification or relegation
1	Middlesbrough	16	9	5	2	32	19	+13	32	Promotion to the Premier League
2	Stoke City	16	10	2	4	25	18	+7	32	Promotion to the Premier League
3	Wolverhampton Wanderers	16	9	4	3	28	19	+9	31	Qualification for Championship play-off semi-finals
4	Birmingham City	16	8	5	3	28	15	+13	29	Qualification for Championship play-off semi-finals
5	West Bromwich Albion	16	8	5	3	25	17	+8	29	Qualification for Championship play-off quarter-finals

Updated to match(es) played on 22 November 2026. Source: EFL Official Website
Rules for classification: 1) Points; 2) Goal difference; 3) Number of goals scored; 4) Head-to-head results; 5) Wins; 6) Away goals; 7) Penalty points (sec 9.5); 8) Number of 12-point sending off offences; 9) Play-off (only if needed to determine promotion/relegation)

== FA Cup ==
Stoke will enter the 2026–27 FA Cup in the third round.

January 2027 Third round	v

== EFL Cup ==
Stoke beat EFL League Two side Oldham Athletic in the first round before losing on penalties to Premier League side Hull City in the second round.

8 August 2026 First round	Stoke City	2–0	Oldham Athletic	Stoke-on-Trent
15:00 BST	Norburn 48' (o.g.); Boženík 82'	Report		Stadium: bet365 Stadium; Attendance: 10,157

25 August 2026 Second round	Stoke City	1–1 (4–5 p)	Hull City	Stoke-on-Trent
19:45 BST	Boženík 39'	Report	Dowell 45'	Stadium: bet365 Stadium; Attendance: 7,141; Referee: Josh Busby
	Penalties
	Thomas (penalty scored); Gallagher (penalty scored); Lawal (penalty scored); Hirst (penalty missed); Soumaré (penalty scored)		(penalty scored) Morita; (penalty scored) McNair; (penalty scored) Stroud; (penalty scored) Millar; (penalty scored) Belloumi

== Squad statistics ==
As of match played 21 November 2026

No.	Pos.	Name	Championship		FA Cup		EFL Cup		Total		Discipline	
No.	Pos.	Name	Apps	Goals	Apps	Goals	Apps	Goals	Apps	Goals	Yellow card	Red card
1	GK	(Sweden) Viktor Johansson	16	0	0	0	1	0	17	0	1	0
2	DF	(England) Ben Johnson	15	1	0	0	1	0	16	1	0	0
3	DF	(England) Aaron Cresswell	0	0	0	0	0	0	0	0	0	0
4	MF	(England) Ben Pearson	0(2)	0	0	0	1	0	1(2)	0	0	0
5	DF	(Scotland) Luke Graham	14	1	0	0	2	0	16	1	3	0
6	MF	(Sweden) Svante Ingelsson	1(4)	0	0	0	1	0	2(4)	0	0	1
7	MF	(United States) Jack McGlynn	10(2)	5	0	0	0	0	10(2)	5	1	0
8	MF	(Northern Ireland) Ethan Galbraith	14	3	0	0	2	0	16	3	6	0
9	FW	(Slovakia) Róbert Boženík	4(8)	1	0	0	1(1)	2	5(9)	3	2	0
10	MF	(South Korea) Bae Jun-ho	5(3)	0	0	0	0(1)	0	5(4)	0	2	0
11	FW	(France) Lamine Cissé	6(2)	1	0	0	1	0	7(2)	1	0	0
13	MF	(Northern Ireland) Justin Devenny	10(2)	2	0	0	0	0	10(2)	2	1	0
14	MF	(England) Ato Ampah	0	0	0	0	0	0	0	0	0	0
15	FW	(Scotland) George Hirst	6(9)	2	0	0	0(1)	0	6(10)	2	3	0
16	DF	(England) Ben Wilmot	16	3	0	0	2	0	18	3	1	0
17	DF	(France) Eric Bocat	10(2)	2	0	0	1	0	11(2)	2	1	0
18	MF	(Republic of Ireland) Bosun Lawal	9(1)	0	0	0	1(1)	0	10(2)	0	4	0
19	MF	(Slovakia) Tomáš Rigo	1(3)	0	0	0	1	0	2(3)	0	0	0
20	FW	(England) Sam Gallagher	4(3)	2	0	0	1(1)	0	5(4)	2	2	0
21	DF	(United States) Luca Bombino	5(7)	0	0	0	0	0	5(7)	0	1	1
22	DF	(Cameroon) Junior Tchamadeu	2(7)	0	0	0	0	0	2(7)	0	1	0
23	DF	(England) Ben Gibson	1	0	0	0	0	0	1	0	0	0
24	GK	(England) Josh Griffiths	0	0	0	0	1	0	1	0	0	0
27	MF	(Senegal) Djibril Soumaré	14(2)	0	0	0	0(2)	0	14(4)	0	3	0
34	GK	(England) Frank Fielding	0	0	0	0	0	0	0	0	0	0
40	DF	(Ukraine) Maksym Talovierov	5(5)	0	0	0	0(1)	0	5(6)	0	2	1
42	FW	(Netherlands) Million Manhoef	4(3)	0	0	0	2	0	6(3)	0	0	0
52	DF	(United States) Freddie Anderson	0	0	0	0	0(1)	0	0(1)	0	0	0
52	DF	(Italy) Laurence Giani	0	0	0	0	1	0	1	0	0	0
58	FW	(England) Tyler Martin	0(1)	0	0	0	0	0	0(1)	0	0	0
Own goals			—	2	—	0	—	1	—	3	—	
Players who featured but departed the club permanently during the season:
7	MF	(Wales) Sorba Thomas	3	0	0	0	2	0	5	0	1	0

== Transfers ==
=== In ===
Date	Pos.	Name	From	Fee	Ref.
15 June 2026 (Note: The transfer was announced on 14 May, and would become official on June 15 once the transfer window opened.)	FW	(Netherlands) Milan Smit	(Netherlands) Go Ahead Eagles	£4,800,000	
25 June 2026	MF	(Senegal) Djibril Soumaré	(Portugal) Braga	£3,400,000	
25 June 2026	GK	(England) Josh Griffiths	(England) West Bromwich Albion	Undisclosed	
1 July 2026	MF	(Northern Ireland) Ethan Galbraith	(Wales) Swansea City	£10,000,000	
1 July 2026	MF	(Sweden) Svante Ingelsson	(England) Sheffield Wednesday	£1,000,000	
2 July 2026	DF	(Scotland) Luke Graham	(Scotland) Dundee	£2,000,000	
28 July 2026	FW	(England) Paul Makavore	(England) Walsall	Free	
28 July 2026	MF	(Scotland) George Morrison	(England) Fleetwood Town	Undisclosed	
28 July 2026	FW	(England) Jack Newall	(England) Burton Albion	Free	
28 July 2026	DF	(England) Will Thompson	(England) Nottingham Forest	Free	
20 August 2026	FW	(Scotland) George Hirst	(England) Ipswich Town	Undisclosed	
1 September 2026	DF	(United States) Luca Bombino	(United States) San Diego	£3,700,000	
1 September 2026	MF	(United States) Jack McGlynn	(United States) Houston Dynamo	Undisclosed	
1 September 2026	MF	(Northern Ireland) Justin Devenny	(England) Crystal Palace	Undisclosed	
4 September 2026	FW	(Wales) Louie Bradbury	(England) Manchester United	Undisclosed	
Total				£24,900,000	

=== Out ===
Date	Pos.	Name	To	Fee	Ref.
26 June 2026	DF	(Republic of Ireland) Jake Griffin	(England) Chester	Free transfer	
27 June 2026	MF	(Republic of Ireland) Darius Lipsiuc	(England) Notts County	Undisclosed	
30 June 2026	MF	(England) Lewis Baker	(Turkey) Bursaspor	Released	
30 June 2026	MF	(France) Steven Nzonzi	(France) USL Dunkerque	Released	
30 June 2026	FW	(Scotland) Kieron Willox	(Scotland) Elgin City	Released	
7 July 2026	FW	(Serbia) Nikola Jojić	(Norway) Start	Mutual consent	
16 August 2026	MF	(Japan) Tatsuki Seko	(Japan) Urawa Red Diamonds	Undisclosed	
1 September 2026	MF	(Wales) Sorba Thomas	(England) Hull City	Undisclosed	

=== Loans in ===
Date from	Pos.	Name	From	Until	Ref.
21 August 2026	DF	(England) Ben Johnson	(England) Ipswich Town	End of Season	

=== Loans out ===
Date from	Pos.	Name	To	Loaned until	Ref
25 June 2026	GK	(England) Tommy Simkin	(England) Doncaster Rovers	End of Season	
7 July 2026	DF	(Kenya) Sydney Agina	(England) Forest Green Rovers	3 October 2026 (Note: On 3 October, Agina was recalled back from his initial half-season loan at Forest Green Rovers, and subsequently joined Tamworth on a one-month loan.)	
14 July 2026	FW	(England) Nathan Lowe	(Scotland) Hibernian	End of Season	
21 July 2026	GK	(England) True Grant	(England) FC Halifax Town	End of Season	
23 July 2026	FW	(England) Emre Tezgel	(England) Wycombe Wanderers	End of Season	
28 July 2026	FW	(England) Chinonso Chibueze	(England) South Shields	25 January 2027	
30 July 2026	FW	(England) Favour Fawunmi	(England) Oldham Athletic	End of Season	
8 August 2026	MF	(England) Ruben Curley	(England) Morecambe	3 January 2027	
14 August 2026	FW	(Netherlands) Milan Smit	(Germany) Darmstadt 98	End of Season	
30 September 2026	MF	(Republic of Ireland) Gabriel Kelly	(England) Tamworth	1 November 2026	
3 October 2026	DF	(Kenya) Sydney Agina	(England) Tamworth	1 November 2026	

== Awards ==
=== Player Awards ===
==== EFL Championship Manager of the Month ====
Month	Player	Result	Ref.
September	(England) Mark Robins	Nominated	

==== EFL Championship Goal of the Month ====
Month	Player	Opposition	Result	Ref.
September	(United States) Jack McGlynn	v. Sheffield United	Nominated	
September	(England) Sam Gallagher	v. Sheffield United	Won	
