= Róbert Boženík =

Slovak footballer (born 1999)

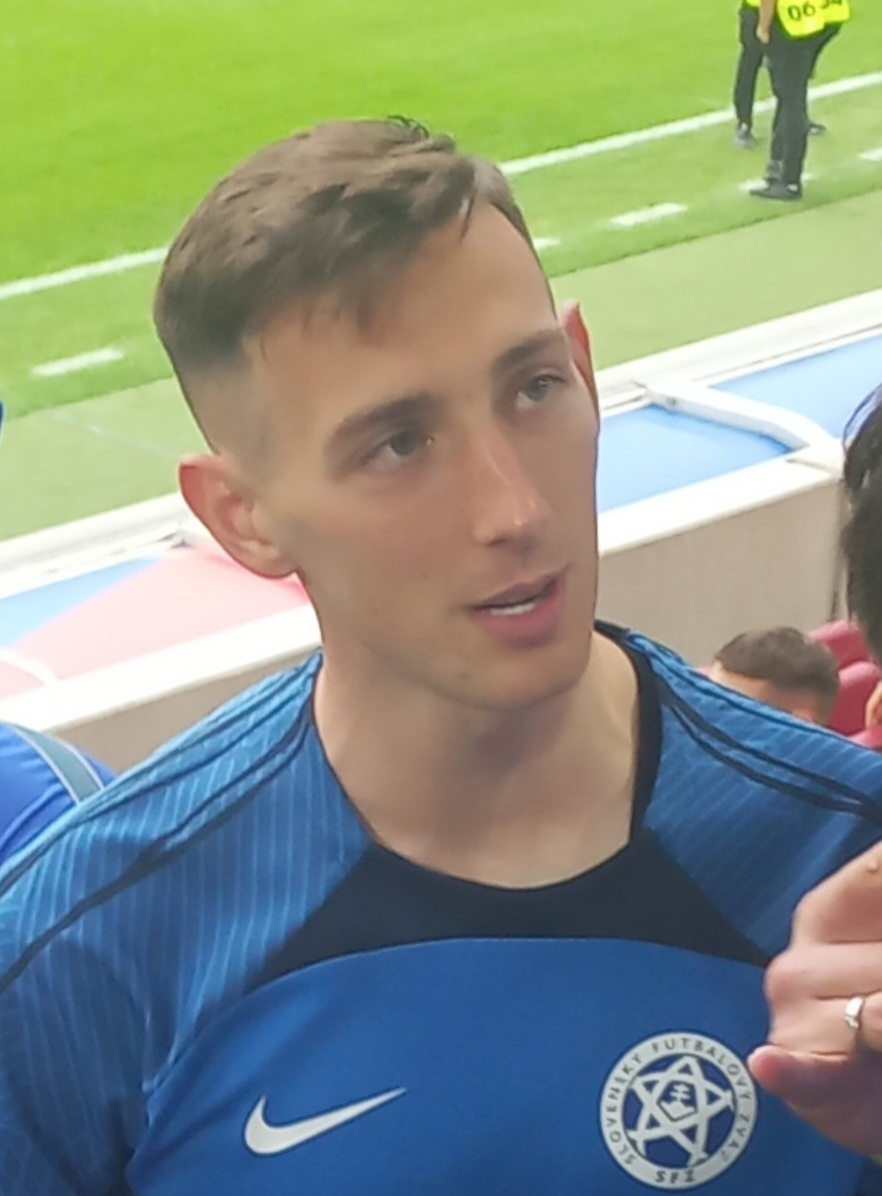
- Boženík with Slovakia at UEFA Euro 2024

Personal information
- Date of birth: 18 November 1999 (age 27)
- Place of birth: Terchová, Slovakia
- Height: 1.88 m (6 ft 2 in)
- Position: Striker

Team information
- Current team: Stoke City
- Number: 9

Youth career
- FK Terchová
- 2009–2016: Žilina

Senior career*
Years	Team	Apps	(Gls)
2016–2019	Žilina B	25	(8)
2017–2020	Žilina	48	(16)
2020–2023	Feyenoord	22	(3)
2021–2022	→ Fortuna Düsseldorf (loan)	20	(2)
2022–2023	→ Boavista (loan)	23	(4)
2023–2025	Boavista	64	(13)
2025–	Stoke City	34	(2)

International career^{‡}
2015	Slovakia U16	1	(0)
2016–2017	Slovakia U18	10	(4)
2017–2018	Slovakia U19	8	(3)
2018	Slovakia U20	4	(0)
2018–2019	Slovakia U21	3	(1)
2019–	Slovakia	61	(9)
- * Club domestic league appearances and goals as of 17:48, 7 November 2026 (UTC) ‡ National team caps and goals as of 16 November 2026

Róbert Boženík (born 18 November 1999) is a Slovak professional footballer who plays as a striker for EFL Championship club Stoke City and the Slovakia national team.

Boženík began his career with Žilina, scoring 15 goals in 2018–19 which saw him join Dutch Eredivisie club Feyenoord in January 2020. He struggled for game time at De Kuip, and spent the 2021–22 season on loan at Fortuna Düsseldorf and the 2022–23 season at Portuguese side Boavista. He joined Boavista permanently in July 2023 and then moved on to Championship side Stoke City in July 2025.

== Club career ==
=== MŠK Žilina ===
Boženík made his professional Fortuna Liga debut for Žilina against Nitra on 28 July 2018, scoring the winning goal in the 54th minute, after an assist by Jakub Holúbek. He was named Fortuna Liga's player of the month for October 2018. Boženík was also praised for his successful spell and crowned one of the league's greatest talents after the autumn part of the 2018–19 season by experts in the media. On 1 December 2018, MŠK had announced a contract extension until June 2022. In the final round of the main part of the Fortuna Liga season, Boženík replaced Filip Balaj in the 76th minute and scoring the decisive goal, ending in a 2–1 victory for MSK Žilina against ŽP Šport Podbrezová. At the Slovnaft Cup against FC Spartak Trnava, Boženík was also one of the players who missed a penalty in the shoot-out. However, in the league, it took him 2 1/2 months to score again, scoring two against Ružomberok in final match of the season, in a 4–2 victory. Overall, Boženík completed the season with 15 goals in 39 competitive games for Žilina.

Based on past season's performances, Boženík was expected to rank among Fortuna Liga's leading top scorers in the new season as well. On 21 September 2019, Boženík scored against competition's newcomer FK Pohronie, securing the 2–1 victory alongside Filip Kaša. At the Slovnaft Cup, Boženík came on as a tactical substitute to avoid an upset elimination in a match against Odeva Lipany, earning a 1–0 victory for Žilina after a goal by Patrik Myslovič. During a yellow card suspension, he played single 2. Liga fixture against Komárno (1–1) for MŠK reserve squad on 27 October 2019, secured the point for MŠK with a late equaliser.

=== Feyenoord ===
On 27 January 2020, Boženík signed a 4 1/2-year contract with Dutch club Feyenoord for a fee of €4.6 million. As his preferred number 9 jersey was taken by Danish forward Nicolai Jørgensen, Boženík had opted for number 19. He made his Eredivisie debut on 1 February 2020 in a 3–1 home victory against Emmen. Boženík scored his first goal for the club on 16 February 2020, putting Feyenoord up 3–4 in the 88th minute in the away game against PEC Zwolle to secure the three points.

=== Boavista ===
On 13 July 2022, Boženík moved to Boavista on loan with a possible buy option. He signed for the club permanently on 11 July 2023 with a three-year contract. Boženík opened the 2023–24 season with two goals against defending champions Benfica in the opening round of the season, in a 3–2 victory. By the sixth matchday, Boženík recorded five goals in five games. The club, which was expected to battle for relegation lost form in later rounds of the season and completed the campaign ranked fifteenth of eighteen. Sevilla's reported interested in Boženík during winter transfer window had failed to materialise. In his second season with Boavista, Boženík was declared Player of the Year 2023–24 by the club, scoring eleven goals of which nine were in league fixtures, and he extended his contract with the club until June 2026.

=== Stoke City ===
Boženík joined EFL Championship side Stoke City in July 2025, signing a three-year contract. He got his first start in a 0–0 draw against Walsall in the first round of the EFL Cup, which Stoke won 4–3 on penalties. Boženík scored his first goal for Stoke City in a 1–0 league victory against Hull City, tapping in a shot from the back post after a cross from Lamine Cisse. However, Boženík was injured at the start of the second half after a hard fall on his shoulder. During the lengthy treatment, he needed oxygen and finally left the field in the 54th minute with tears in his eyes and a fixed left hand. He returned to the squad for the final few matches of the 2025–26 season.

== International career ==
On 7 June 2019, Boženík debuted for the Slovak senior squad in a friendly match against Jordan. He scored his first international goal in a friendly match against Hungary on 9 September 2019. In the third friendly match against Paraguay on 13 October 2019, Boženík came on as a substitute to Adam Nemec.

== Style of play ==
Boženík was described as a "complete forward with a good mix of technique and physical ability", by football podcaster Carter Phillips, highlighting that while he can prove himself as a striker, he is also valuable in setting-up play. Phillips compared Boženík to Petar Musa. Meanwhile, Pedro Cadima of O Jogo spoke highly of Boženík's mobility, self-sacrifice and dedication to fulfilling defensive roles, as he has to "contribute to the equilibrium of the team", while noticing that the role of an alternate striker in his first seasons with Boavista may have caused issues with his confidence.

== Career statistics ==
=== Club ===
As of match played 7 November 2026

Appearances and goals by club, season and competition
Club	Season	League			National cup (Note: Includes DFB-Pokal, KNVB Cup, FA Cup, Slovak Cup, Taça de Portugal)		League cup (Note: Includes EFL Cup, Taça da Liga)		Europe		Total	
Club	Season	Division	Apps	Goals	Apps	Goals	Apps	Goals	Apps	Goals	Apps	Goals
Žilina B	2015–16	Slovak 2. liga	2	0	—		—		—		2	0
Žilina B	2016–17	Slovak 2. liga	11	1	—		—		—		11	1
Žilina B	2017–18	Slovak 2. liga	11	6	—		—		—		11	6
Žilina B	2019–20	Slovak 2. liga	1	1	—		—		—		1	1
Žilina B	Total		25	8	—		—		—		25	8
Žilina	2017–18	Slovak 1. liga	0	0	2	1	—		0	0	2	1
Žilina	2018–19	Slovak 1. liga	32	13	7	2	—		—		39	15
Žilina	2019–20	Slovak 1. liga	16	3	1	0	—		—		17	3
Žilina	Total		48	16	10	3	—		0	0	58	19
Feyenoord	2019–20	Eredivisie	5	2	1	1	—		0	0	6	3
Feyenoord	2020–21	Eredivisie	16	1	0	0	—		0	0	16	1
Feyenoord	2021–22	Eredivisie	1	0	0	0	—		5 (Note: Appearances in UEFA Conference League)	0	6	0
Feyenoord	Total		22	3	1	1	—		5	0	28	4
Fortuna Düsseldorf (loan)	2021–22	2. Bundesliga	20	2	1	0	—		0	0	21	2
Boavista (loan)	2022–23	Primeira Liga	23	4	1	0	3	0	—		27	4
Boavista	2023–24	Primeira Liga	31	8	2	2	1	0	—		34	10
Boavista	2024–25	Primeira Liga	33	5	1	0	0	0	—		33	5
Boavista	Total		87	17	4	2	4	0	—		95	19
Stoke City	2025–26	Championship	22	1	0	0	2	0	—		24	1
Stoke City	2026–27	Championship	12	1	0	0	2	2	—		14	3
Stoke City	Total		34	2	0	0	4	2	—		38	4
Career total			236	48	16	6	8	2	5	0	265	56

=== International ===
As of match played 16 November 2026

Appearances and goals by national team and year
National team	Year	Apps	Goals
Slovakia	2019	8	4
Slovakia	2020	5	0
Slovakia	2021	9	1
Slovakia	2022	7	0
Slovakia	2023	8	1
Slovakia	2024	11	1
Slovakia	2025	7	0
Slovakia	2026	6	2
Total		61	9

Scores and results list Slovakia's goal tally first, score column indicates score after each Boženík goal.

List of international goals scored by Róbert Boženík
No.	Date	Venue	Cap	Opponent	Score	Result	Competition
1	9 September 2019	Groupama Arena, Budapest, Hungary	4	Hungary	2–1	2–1	UEFA Euro 2020 qualification
2	13 October 2019	Tehelné pole, Bratislava, Slovakia	6	Paraguay	1–0	1–1	Friendly
3	16 November 2019	Stadion Rujevica, Rijeka, Croatia	7	Croatia	1–0	1–3	UEFA Euro 2020 qualification
4	19 November 2019	Štadión Antona Malatinského, Trnava, Slovakia	8	Azerbaijan	1–0	2–0	UEFA Euro 2020 qualification
5	1 September 2021	Stožice Stadium, Ljubljana, Slovenia	17	Slovenia	1–0	1–1	2022 FIFA World Cup qualification
6	19 November 2023	Bilino Polje, Zenica, Bosnia and Herzegovina	37	Bosnia and Herzegovina	1–1	2–1	UEFA Euro 2024 qualification
7	9 June 2024	Štadión Antona Malatinského, Trnava, Slovakia	40	Wales	2–0	4–0	Friendly
8	5 June 2026	Košická Futbalová Aréna, Košice, Slovakia	57	Montenegro	1–0	2-2	Friendly
9	16 November 2026	Astana Arena, Astana, Kazakhstan	61	Kazakhstan	1–1	2–2	2026–27 Nations League C

== Honours ==
Individual

- Peter Dubovský Award: 2019
