= Tomáš Rigo =

Slovak footballer (born 2002)

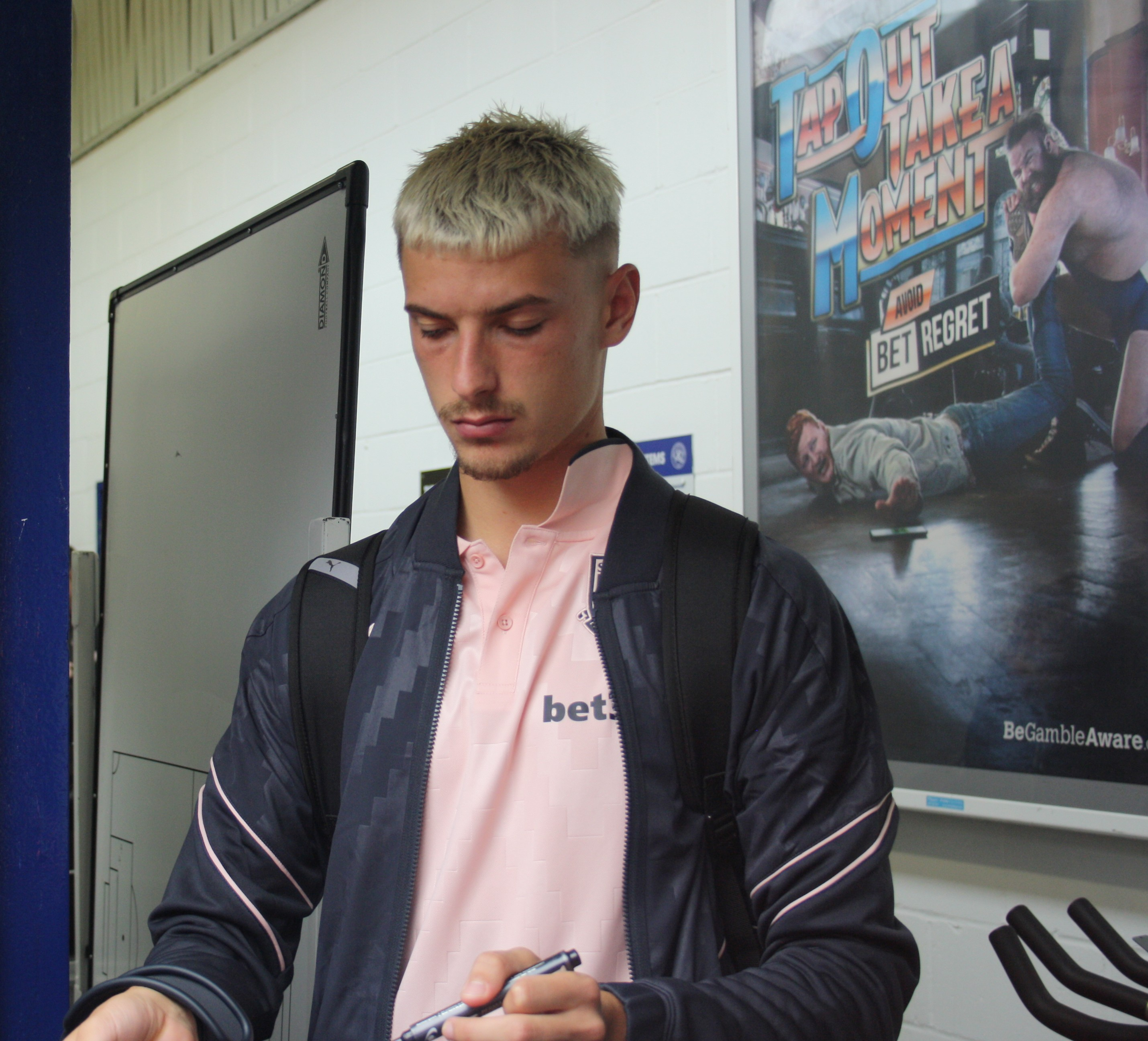
- Rigo in 2025

Personal information
- Full name: Tomáš Rigo
- Date of birth: 3 July 2002 (age 24)
- Place of birth: Poprad, Slovakia
- Height: 1.80 m (5 ft 11 in)
- Position: Midfielder

Team information
- Current team: Stoke City
- Number: 19

Youth career
- 2012–2013: FAM Poprad
- 2013–2014: FK Poprad
- 2014–2016: Tatran Prešov
- 2016–2018: Ružomberok
- 2018–2020: Slavia Prague

Senior career*
Years	Team	Apps	(Gls)
2020–2023	Slavia Prague	1	(0)
2020	Slavia Prague B	5	(0)
2021–2023	→ Vlašim (loan)	57	(10)
2023–2025	Baník Ostrava	66	(5)
2025–	Stoke City	35	(1)

International career^{‡}
2018–2020	Slovakia U18	4	(1)
2019	Slovakia U19	1	(0)
2022–2025	Slovakia U21	13	(1)
2024–	Slovakia	17	(3)
- * Club domestic league appearances and goals as of 22:01, 3 November 2026 (UTC) ‡ National team caps and goals as of 18 November 2026

Tomáš Rigo (born 3 July 2002) is a Slovak professional footballer who plays as a midfielder for EFL Championship club Stoke City.

Rigo began his career with Czech side Slavia Prague progressing through their youth academy to make his professional debut in December 2020. He spent two seasons on loan in the Czech National Football League with Vlašim before joining Baník Ostrava in June 2023. After two years at the Městský stadion Rigo moved to EFL Championship side Stoke City.

== Club career ==
=== Early life and career ===
Rigo was born in Poprad, Slovakia and he grew up playing youth football for FAM Poprad, FK Poprad, Tatran Prešov, and Ružomberok. At 16 years old, Rigo joined Czech side Slavia Prague.

=== Slavia Prague ===
Rigo made his professional debut with Slavia Prague in a UEFA Europa League group stage match against Bayer 04 Leverkusen in December 2020. He signed a professional four-year contract with Slavia Prague on 28 January 2021. At the start of the 2021–22 season, Rigo was one of nine Slavia Prague players to play on loan at Vlašim, making seven starts and scoring once by the middle of September in the Czech second tier. He helped Vlašim reach the promotion play-offs where they lost 5–2 on aggregate to Teplice.

=== Baník Ostrava ===
On 28 June 2023, Rigo signed a long-term contract with Baník Ostrava. The same year on 17 December, he made his league debut in a 2–3 loss against his former club, Slavia Prague. Rigo went on to play the full match in a 1–0 victory against FK Pardubice on 17 March 2024. Rigo extended his contract with Baník in February 2025, signing until December 2028.

=== Stoke City ===
On 30 August 2025, Rigo signed a four-year contract with EFL Championship club Stoke City. He debuted for the team in a 1–0 league win against Birmingham City coming on off the bench in the 71st minute. Rigo scored his first goal for Stoke in a 2–1 loss against Middlesbrough, firing a dipping shot from outside the box at Boro goalkeeper Sol Brynn, who let it slip through his hands to give Stoke the opener in the 15th minute. In the 2025–26 season Rigo made 33 appearances as Stoke finished in 17th position.

== International career ==
Having represented Slovakia at under-18 and under-21 level, Rigo received his first call-up to the Slovakia senior team for friendly matches against Austria and Norway in March 2024. Rigo was named in Slovakia's provisional squad for UEFA Euro 2024 on 28 May 2024, making his debut on 5 June in a friendly match against San Marino and scoring the opening goal in a 4–0 victory. He was named in the final 26-man squad for the final Euro 2024 tournament in Germany but did not make an appearance.

== Style of play ==
His playing style has been compared to that of Bastian Schweinsteiger and Cesc Fàbregas by Czech media.

== Career statistics ==
=== Club ===
As of match played 3 November 2026

Appearances and goals by club, season and competition
Club	Season	League			National Cup (Note: Includes Czech Cup, FA Cup)		League Cup (Note: Includes EFL Cup)		Other		Total	
Club	Season	Division	Apps	Goals	Apps	Goals	Apps	Goals	Apps	Goals	Apps	Goals
Slavia Prague	2020–21	Czech First League	1	0	1	0	—		1 (Note: Appearances in UEFA Europa League)	0	3	0
Slavia Prague B	2020–21	ČFL	5	0	—		—		—		5	0
Vlašim (loan)	2021–22	Czech National Football League	28	7	2	1	—		2 (Note: Appearances in Czech National Football League promotion play-offs)	0	32	8
Vlašim (loan)	2022–23	Czech National Football League	29	3	2	2	—		—		31	5
Vlašim (loan)	Total		57	10	4	3	—		2	0	63	13
Baník Ostrava	2023–24	Czech First League	31	3	2	0	—		—		33	3
Baník Ostrava	2024–25	Czech First League	31	1	4	2	—		3 (Note: Appearances in UEFA Conference League)	0	38	3
Baník Ostrava	2025–26	Czech First League	4	1	0	0	—		6 (Note: Two appearances in UEFA Europa League and four in UEFA Conference League)	0	10	1
Baník Ostrava	Total		66	5	6	2	—		9	0	81	7
Stoke City	2025–26	EFL Championship	31	1	2	0	0	0	—		33	1
Stoke City	2026–27	EFL Championship	4	0	0	0	1	0	—		5	0
Stoke City	Total		35	1	2	0	1	0	—		38	1
Career total			164	16	13	5	1	0	12	0	190	21

=== International ===
As of match played 16 November 2026

Appearances and goals by national team and year
National team	Year	Apps	Goals
Slovakia	2024	5	1
Slovakia	2025	6	1
Slovakia	2026	6	1
Total		17	3

==== International goals ====
No.	Date	Venue	Opponent	Score	Result	Competition
1.	5 June 2024	Wiener Neustadt Arena, Wiener Neustadt, Austria	San Marino	1–0	4–0	Friendly
2.	7 September 2025	Stade de Luxembourg, Luxembourg City, Luxembourg	Luxembourg	1–0	1–0	2026 FIFA World Cup qualification
3.	2 October 2026	Tórsvøllur, Tórshavn, Faroe Islands	Faroe Islands	1–0	1–1	2026–27 UEFA Nations League C
