= Tyler Martin (footballer) =

English association football player (born 2005)

Personal information
- Full name: Tyler Emmanuel Alexander Martin
- Date of birth: 25 December 2007 (age 18)
- Place of birth: Liverpool, England
- Position: Forward

Team information
- Current team: Stoke City
- Number: 58

Youth career
- 2021–2026: Liverpool
- 2026: Stoke City

Senior career*
Years	Team	Apps	(Gls)
2026–	Stoke City	1	(0)
- * Club domestic league appearances and goals as of 14:03, 29 August 2026 (UTC)

Tyler Emmanuel Alexander Martin (born 25 December 2007) is an English professional footballer who plays as a forward for EFL Championship club Stoke City.

== Club career ==
Martin joined the Liverpool academy at the age of 13 and progressed through the youth teams up to under-18 level. In February 2026, Martin joined Stoke City's U21 squad following a successful trial period. Martin made his Championship debut on 29 August 2026, coming on as a late substitute in a 4–1 defeat away at Wolverhampton Wanderers.

== Career statistics ==
As of match played 29 August 2026

Appearances and goals by club, season and competition
Club	Season	League			FA Cup		League Cup		Other		Total	
Club	Season	Division	Apps	Goals	Apps	Goals	Apps	Goals	Apps	Goals	Apps	Goals
Stoke City	2026–27	Championship	1	0	0	0	0	0	—		1	0
Career total			1	0	0	0	0	0	0	0	1	0
