= Jaden Mears =

English association football player (born 2005)

Personal information
- Full name: Jaden Jamil Mears
- Date of birth: 1 May 2006 (age 20)
- Place of birth: Liverpool, England
- Position: Right-back

Team information
- Current team: Stoke City
- Number: 57

Youth career
- 2012–2018: Everton
- 2018–2025: Stoke City

Senior career*
Years	Team	Apps	(Gls)
2025–	Stoke City	0	(0)
- * Club domestic league appearances and goals as of 21:48, 12 August 2025 (UTC)

Jaden Jamil Mears (born 1 May 2006) is an English professional footballer who plays as a right-back for EFL Championship club Stoke City.

== Club career ==
Mears began his career with Stoke City progressing through the club's academy from under-12 level, making his professional debut on 12 August 2025 in a EFL Cup victory against Walsall. In November 2025, Mears signed a new contract with Stoke until the summer of 2027.

== Personal life ==
His father, Tyrone Mears, is a former professional footballer.

== Career statistics ==
As of match played 26 August 2025

Appearances and goals by club, season and competition
Club	Season	League			FA Cup		League Cup		Other		Total	
Club	Season	Division	Apps	Goals	Apps	Goals	Apps	Goals	Apps	Goals	Apps	Goals
Stoke City	2025–26	Championship	0	0	0	0	2	0	—		2	0
Career total			0	0	0	0	2	0	0	0	2	0
