= Ato Ampah =

English footballer (born 2006)

Personal information
- Full name: Ato Bondze Ampah
- Date of birth: 22 April 2006 (age 20)
- Place of birth: Accra, Ghana
- Height: 1.76 m (5 ft 9 in)
- Position: Winger

Team information
- Current team: Stoke City
- Number: 14

Youth career
- 2016–2024: Chelsea

Senior career*
Years	Team	Apps	(Gls)
2024–2026	Chelsea	0	(0)
2026–	Stoke City	0	(0)

International career^{‡}
2024	England U18	1	(0)
2025–	England U20	1	(0)
- * Club domestic league appearances and goals ‡ National team caps and goals as of 15:28, 15 November 2025 (UTC)

Ato Bondze Ampah (born 22 April 2006) is a professional footballer who plays as a winger for EFL Championship club Stoke City. Born in Ghana, he is a youth international for England.

== Club career ==
=== Chelsea ===
Born in Ghana, Ampah moved to London, England with his family at the age of seven and began playing grassroots football. He joined the Chelsea academy at under-11 level in 2016. On 28 April 2023, Ampah signed his professional contract with Chelsea. On 12 December 2024, having been selected as part of a young squad for the 2024–25 UEFA Conference League league phase match against Astana, Ampah made his professional debut as a second-half substitute.

=== Stoke City ===
On 2 February 2026, Ampah joined Championship club Stoke City for an undisclosed fee, signing a three-and-a-half year contract.

== International career ==
Ampah has represented England at under-18 level. He is also eligible to represent Ghana.

On 14 November 2025, Ampah made his England U20 during a 1–1 draw with Japan at the Eco-Power Stadium.

== Career statistics ==
=== Club ===
As of match played 12 December 2024

Appearances and goals by club, season and competition
Club	Season	League			FA Cup		EFL Cup		Europe		Other		Total	
Club	Season	Division	Apps	Goals	Apps	Goals	Apps	Goals	Apps	Goals	Apps	Goals	Apps	Goals
Chelsea U21	2023–24	—			—		—		—		1 (Note: Appearances in EFL Trophy)	0	1	0
Chelsea U21	2024–25	—			—		—		—		3	0	3	0
Chelsea U21	Total		—		—		—		—		4	0	4	0
Chelsea	2024–25	Premier League	0	0	0	0	0	0	1 (Note: Appearances in UEFA Conference League)	0	0	0	1	0
Chelsea	2025–26	Premier League	0	0	0	0	0	0	0	0	0	0	0	0
Chelsea	Total		0	0	0	0	0	0	1	0	0	0	1	0
Stoke City	2025–26	Championship	0	0	0	0	0	0	—		—		0	0
Stoke City	2026–27	Championship	0	0	0	0	0	0	—		—		0	0
Stoke City	Total		0	0	0	0	0	0	0	0	0	0	0	0
Career total			0	0	0	0	0	0	1	0	4	0	5	0

== Honours ==
Chelsea

- UEFA Conference League: 2024–25
