= Sydney Agina =

English association football player (born 2006)

Personal information
- Full name: Sydney Cesc Jean Agina
- Date of birth: 31 August 2007 (age 19)
- Place of birth: Manchester, England
- Position: Defender

Team information
- Current team: Tamworth (on loan from Stoke City)

Youth career
- 2014–2026: Stoke City

Senior career*
Years	Team	Apps	(Gls)
2026–	Stoke City	5	(0)
2026	→ Forest Green Rovers (loan)	4	(0)
2026–	→ Tamworth (loan)	0	(0)

International career^{‡}
2026–	Kenya	1	(0)
- * Club domestic league appearances and goals as of 12:18, 3 October 2026 (UTC) ‡ National team caps and goals as of 12:01, 8 June 2026 (UTC)

Sydney Cesc Jean Agina (born 31 August 2007) is a professional footballer who plays as a defender for National League club Tamworth on loan from EFL Championship club Stoke City. Born in England, he represents the Kenya national team.

== Club career ==
Agina joined the Stoke City academy at under-8 level, progressing through to sign scholarship forms in June 2023. He signed a two-year professional contract in the summer of 2025. Agina spent 2025–26 pre-season with the first-team and went out to their training camp in Spain. He made his Championship debut on 10 March 2026 against Ipswich Town, coming on as a substitute in the 70th minute in a 3–3 draw. On 7 July, Agina signed a new two-year contract with Stoke and joined National League side Forest Green Rovers on loan until January 2027. Following a change in manager at Forest Green, Agnia's loan was cut short and he moved on to Tamworth for a months loan.

== International career ==
Agina was called up by Benni McCarthy for the Kenya national team in May 2026.

== Personal life ==
Agina, was born in England to Kenyan parents.

== Career statistics ==
=== Club ===
As of match played 31 August 2026

Appearances and goals by club, season and competition
Club	Season	League			FA Cup		EFL Cup		Other		Total	
Club	Season	Division	Apps	Goals	Apps	Goals	Apps	Goals	Apps	Goals	Apps	Goals
Stoke City	2025–26	Championship	5	0	0	0	0	0	—		5	0
Stoke City	2026–27	Championship	0	0	0	0	0	0	—		0	0
Stoke City	Total		5	0	0	0	0	0	0	0	5	0
Forest Green Rovers (loan)	2026–27	National League	4	0	0	0	0	0	0	0	4	0
Tamworth (loan)	2026–27	National League	0	0	0	0	0	0	0	0	0	0
Career total			9	0	0	0	0	0	0	0	9	0

=== International ===
As of match played 7 June 2026

Appearances and goals by national team and year
National team	Year	Apps	Goals
Kenya	2026	1	0
Total		1	0
