= Sam Gallagher (footballer, born 1995) =

English footballer

Personal information
- Full name: Samuel James Gallagher
- Date of birth: 15 September 1995 (age 31)
- Place of birth: Crediton, England
- Height: 6 ft 4 in (1.94 m)
- Positions: Striker; winger

Team information
- Current team: Stoke City
- Number: 20

Youth career
- 2006–2012: Plymouth Argyle
- 2012–2013: Southampton

Senior career*
Years	Team	Apps	(Gls)
2013–2019	Southampton	22	(1)
2015–2016	→ Milton Keynes Dons (loan)	13	(0)
2016–2017	→ Blackburn Rovers (loan)	43	(11)
2017–2018	→ Birmingham City (loan)	33	(6)
2019–2024	Blackburn Rovers	176	(34)
2024–	Stoke City	48	(7)

International career
2013	Scotland U19	3	(1)
2014	England U19	3	(1)
2015	England U20	4	(1)
- * Club domestic league appearances and goals as of 20:38, 21 November 2026 (UTC)

Samuel James Gallagher (born 15 September 1995) is an English professional footballer who plays as a striker for EFL Championship club Stoke City.

Originally a member of the Plymouth Argyle youth academy, Gallagher joined Southampton in 2012 and earned a call-up to the first team at the beginning of the 2013–14 season. He spent time out on loan at Milton Keynes Dons, Blackburn Rovers and Birmingham City before he joined Blackburn on a permanent basis in July 2019. He stayed at Ewood Park for five years scoring 37 goals in 188 games before joining Stoke City in July 2024.

== Club career ==
=== Early career ===
Gallagher was born in Crediton, Devon, and originally played for the Plymouth Argyle youth academy. He also played for the Devon County Football Association alongside Ollie Watkins.

=== Southampton ===
In April 2012 he joined Southampton amidst reported interest from fellow Premier League clubs Everton and Newcastle United. The striker made his debut for the Southampton first team on 6 November 2013 in the League Cup against Sunderland, coming on as a 79th-minute substitute for Gastón Ramírez. He later scored a second-half hat-trick against local rivals Portsmouth in a 7–0 victory in the FA Youth Cup in December. Gallagher continued to make semi-regular substitute appearances for the first team, before scoring his first senior goal against Championship side Yeovil Town in the FA Cup on 25 January 2014. He made his full senior debut for the club on 28 January when he started in a league match against leaders Arsenal, coming close to scoring his first league goal on a number of occasions. He scored his first Premier League goal on 15 March 2014, in a 4–2 win against Norwich City. On 10 May 2014, Gallagher was awarded a long-term contract extension with the Saints until the summer of 2018.

==== Milton Keynes Dons (loan) ====
On 29 July 2015, Gallagher joined Championship side Milton Keynes Dons on loan for the 2015–16 season. Gallagher made his debut for MK Dons in a 4–1 win away to Rotherham United on 8 August. On 6 January 2016, having failed to score in 15 appearances, he was recalled by Southampton.

==== Blackburn Rovers (loan) ====
On 11 August 2016, Gallagher joined Championship side Blackburn Rovers on a season-long loan deal. He scored his first goal for Blackburn in a 2–2 draw with Burton Albion on 20 August. On 20 October, Blackburn's manager, Owen Coyle, expressed his desire to sign Gallagher on a permanent contract, after he scored five goals from nine starting appearances. He finished the season with 12 goals from 47 appearances – 11 from 43 in the league – as Blackburn were relegated to League One.

==== Birmingham City (loan) ====
Gallagher joined another Championship club, Birmingham City, on 21 August 2017 on loan for the 2017–18 season. As one of 13 new arrivals in a squad whose manager, Harry Redknapp, was sacked a few weeks later, Gallagher had an unsettling start to the season. He made his debut on 26 August playing as a lone striker in Birmingham's 2–0 home defeat against Reading; according to the Birmingham Mail's reporter, he "was totally starved of service". His first goal, deflected off defender Michael Dawson in stoppage time in a 6–1 loss at Hull City with incoming manager Steve Cotterill watching from the stands, took nine appearances to arrive. He welcomed Cotterill's fitness regime, and accepted that team selection would be based on the likelihood of those selected being able to make an impact. Amid speculation that the club might try to end his loan early, he was given a chance on the wing – a position he had played with Blackburn – after Isaac Vassell sustained a long-term injury.

He was then moved into the centre, and on 16 December, in a 2–1 defeat at home to Queens Park Rangers, he was the Birmingham Mail's man of the match, as he touched home the rebound from Maikel Kieftenbeld's shot as well as making a contribution defensively. Gallagher opened the scoring in the next match, away to Sunderland, and was sent off for two yellow cards – one for simulation, the second for a foul – as Birmingham held on for a draw. After serving his one-match ban, the scoring spree continued with a goal in four of the six matches up to the end of January – two wins and a draw in the league, and the only goal of the FA Cup third-round tie against Burton Albion. When Garry Monk took over in early March, he used Gallagher from the bench in his first match and partnering Lukas Jutkiewicz in a two-man attack in the next, after which a calf injury kept him out until the last three matches of the season. He was a substitute in the first two, and started alongside Jutkiewicz in the last, a 3–1 win at home to Fulham that ensured Championship survival. His six goals made him the team's top league goalscorer.

=== Blackburn Rovers ===
On 13 July 2019, Gallagher joined Blackburn Rovers on a four-year deal for an undisclosed fee. Under former Rovers manager Tony Mowbray, who departed the club in June 2022, Gallagher often found himself being played on the wings by Mowbray, instead of his natural central position, playing 3,469 minutes on the wing from a total of 7,429 minutes played under his former manager. The decision to play Gallagher out wide caused frustration amongst some Blackburn fans, frustration which continued under new head coach Jon Dahl Tomasson. In his five seasons at Ewood Park, Gallagher made 188 appearances, scoring 37 goals.

=== Stoke City ===
Gallagher joined Stoke City on 31 July 2024 for an undisclosed fee, signing a three-year contract. He scored his first goal for Stoke on 2 October 2024 in a 6–1 victory against Portsmouth. Gallagher struggled with injuries in 2024–25, making 22 appearances, as Stoke avoided relegation on the final day. His injury problems continued in 2025–26, making 20 appearances of which just four were starts.

== International career ==
Gallagher has a Glaswegian father, and played three games for Scotland at under-19 level. In February 2014 shortly after his father's death, Gallagher switched allegiance to his birth country, England. On 24 February 2014, he was called up by the England under-19s for a friendly match against Turkey. He made his debut in the game, which England won 3–0.

== Career statistics ==
As of match played 21 November 2026

Appearances and goals by club, season and competition
Club	Season	League			FA Cup		League Cup		Other		Total	
Club	Season	Division	Apps	Goals	Apps	Goals	Apps	Goals	Apps	Goals	Apps	Goals
Southampton	2013–14	Premier League	18	1	1	1	1	0	—		20	2
Southampton	2014–15	Premier League	0	0	0	0	0	0	—		0	0
Southampton	2018–19	Premier League	4	0	1	0	1	0	—		6	0
Southampton	Total		22	1	2	1	2	0	—		26	2
Milton Keynes Dons (loan)	2015–16	Championship	13	0	0	0	2	0	—		15	0
Blackburn Rovers (loan)	2016–17	Championship	43	11	2	1	2	0	—		47	12
Birmingham City (loan)	2017–18	Championship	33	6	1	1	0	0	—		34	7
Blackburn Rovers	2019–20	Championship	42	6	1	0	1	1	—		44	7
Blackburn Rovers	2020–21	Championship	39	8	0	0	0	0	—		39	8
Blackburn Rovers	2021–22	Championship	37	9	1	0	1	0	—		39	9
Blackburn Rovers	2022–23	Championship	34	8	4	0	1	0	—		39	8
Blackburn Rovers	2023–24	Championship	24	3	2	1	1	1	—		27	5
Blackburn Rovers	Total		176	34	8	1	4	2	—		188	37
Stoke City	2024–25	Championship	22	3	0	0	0	0	—		22	3
Stoke City	2025–26	Championship	19	2	1	0	0	0	—		20	2
Stoke City	2026–27	Championship	7	2	0	0	2	0	—		9	2
Stoke City	Total		48	7	1	0	2	0	—		51	7
Career total			335	59	14	4	12	2	—		361	65

== Honours ==
Southampton U21

- U21 Premier League Cup: 2014–15
