= 2025–26 Stoke City F.C. season =

English football club season

Stoke City
2025–26 season
- Chairman: John Coates
- Manager: Mark Robins
- Stadium: bet365 Stadium
- Championship: 17th
- FA Cup: Fourth round
- EFL Cup: Second round
- Top goalscorer: Sorba Thomas (10)
- Highest home attendance: 27,421 v Coventry City (8 November 2025)
- Lowest home attendance: 20,153 v Oxford United (25 February 2026)
- Average home league attendance: 23,698
Home colours	Away colours	Third colours

The 2025–26 season was Stoke City's 109th season in the Football League, and the 49th in the second tier.

The summer of 2025 again saw Stoke very active in the transfer market and a high turnover of players. Stoke began the season well and after 14 games played they were in 2nd position, however by December an injury crisis began to take hold and results and performances dropped off. In the second half of the season Stoke fell out of play-off contention and back into a more familiar mid-table position, finishing in 17th.

== Pre-season ==
After avoiding relegation on the final day of the 2024–25 season, manager Mark Robins quickly released his retained list. leaving the club were Lynden Gooch, Michael Rose, Enda Stevens and Jordan Thompson whilst Lewis Baker signed a one-year extension. Stoke made their first signing of the summer, bringing in Welsh winger Sorba Thomas from Huddersfield Town on a three-year contract. Also coming into the team were veteran left-back Aaron Cresswell, Ukrainian centre-back Maksym Talovierov, Slovak forward Róbert Boženík and the return of Steven Nzonzi. Jamie Donley, Divin Mubama and Ashley Phillips joined on season-long loans. Departing the club were Wouter Burger, and Sol Sidibe.

Stoke played friendlies against Brighton & Hove Albion, Burnley, Crewe Alexandra, Liverpool, Shrewsbury Town and Wolverhampton Wanderers.

9 July 2025 Friendly	Stoke City	0–1	Shrewsbury Town	Stoke-on-Trent
13:00 BST		Report	Stewart	Stadium: Clayton Wood Training Ground; Attendance: 0 (behind closed doors)

16 July 2025 Friendly	Stoke City	1–3	Brighton & Hove Albion	Marbella, Andalusia, Spain
18:00 BST	Baker 38' (pen.)	Report	Mitoma 35'; Coppola 47'; Rutter 90+1'	Stadium: Marbella Football Centre; Attendance: 0 (behind closed doors)

20 July 2025 Friendly	Liverpool	5–0	Stoke City	Liverpool
	Chiesa; Ngumoha; Núñez	Report		Stadium: Melwood; Attendance: 0 (behind closed doors)

23 July 2025 Friendly	Crewe Alexandra	1–2	Stoke City	Crewe
19:30 BST	March 10' (pen.)	Report	Lawal 21'; Thomas 34'	Stadium: Gresty Road

26 July 2025 Friendly	Stoke City	1–1	Wolverhampton Wanderers	Stoke-on-Trent
15:00 BST	Bae Jun-ho 44'	Report	Hwang Hee-chan 75'	Stadium: bet365 Stadium

2 August 2025 Friendly	Stoke City	1–0	Burnley	Stoke-on-Trent
15:00 BST	Wilmot 13'	Report		Stadium: bet365 Stadium

== Championship ==
=== August ===
Stoke began their 2025–26 Championship campaign at home against Derby County. Stoke came from a goal down to beat the Rams 3–1 with late debut goals from Divin Mubama and Sorba Thomas. The first away game against Sheffield Wednesday at Hillsborough was played with the home supporters protesting against their owner Dejphon Chansiri. His lack of funding lead to Wednesday starting the season with a threadbare squad and Stoke took full advantage, winning 3–0 with a brace from Million Manhoef and another for Mubama. Stoke won their third game in a row against relegated Southampton, despite having Mubama sent-off for two bookable offences. Their winning start came to an end after losing 1–0 to midlands rivals West Bromwich Albion after Nat Phillips capitalised on a dropped catch by Johansson. Stoke's final transfer activity saw them bring in Slovak midfielder Tomáš Rigo from Czech side Baník Ostrava.

=== September ===
Following the international break, new signing Rigo started as Stoke took on promoted Birmingham City. Bosun Lawal scored his first Stoke goal, a looping header over the stranded Ryan Allsop to earn a narrow 1–0 victory. Stoke were then beaten by the same scoreline away at Queens Park Rangers. In their next home match against Norwich City, Stoke dominated for long periods but went behind after slack defending allowed Jovon Makama to score from close range. Thomas equalised soon after half time and despite having 23 shots on goal Stoke were unable to score a second. They ended September with a goalless draw against early Championship leaders Middlesbrough, although Lawal suffered a hamstring injury.

=== October ===
Stoke drew a third game in a row after Augustus Kargbo cancelled out Manhoef's opener away at Blackburn Rovers. Following the second international break Stoke took on newly promoted Wrexham in what was the first league meeting between the sides since 2002. Stoke had an early let off as Ryan Longman missed an open goal before a cross from Sorba Thomas deceived Wrexham keeper Arthur Okonkwo. They were then beaten 2–0 by Millwall with early goals from Femi Azeez and Tristan Crama. A closely fought game away at Portsmouth was settled in the 70th minute after a cross from Thomas was headed into his own net by Hayden Matthews.

=== November ===
Mubama scored an early tap-in against Bristol City before being gifted a second goal by Robins goalkeeper Radek Vítek who failed to collect a loose ball. Mubama then set up Manhoef to make it 3–0 before half-time. In the second half Mubama completed his hat-trick and Junior Tchamadeu scored a rare goal whilst Mark Sykes got a late consolation for Bristol City. Stoke then eased to a 3–0 win away at Oxford United with a brace from Baker and Steven Nzonzi scoring his first since his return. With Stoke in 2nd position the faced the early league leaders, Coventry City. In what was a tight match between the top two it was settled by a late overhead kick by Ephron Mason-Clark. On 21 November, Robins and his coaching staff signed new three-and-a-half year contracts with the club. After the final international break of the year Stoke travelled to Leicester City where they were 2–0 down at half time after goals from Stephy Mavididi and Patson Daka. Bae Jun-ho pulled one back just after half-time but Stoke were unable to find an equaliser with former keeper Asmir Begović making some important saves. Sorba Thomas scored twice from crosses against Charlton Athletic in a 3–0 victory. Stoke ended November with a 2–1 defeat against Hull City to slip down to 4th.

=== December ===
Stoke were well beaten 4–0 by a rejuvenated Sheffield United in the first game in December. The team dropped out of the play-off places for the first time this season after losing 1–0 at Ipswich Town after an early goal from Jaden Philogene. They recovered the following week beating Swansea City 2–1 with Ben Pearson scoring his first goal for the club. Stoke then suffered another narrow defeat, losing 1–0 at Watford. On Boxing Day, Stoke played out a drab goalless draw with Preston North End. 2025 was ended with a 2–1 defeat against Sheffield United.

=== January ===
2026 began with the news that Tommy Simkin had been recalled from his loan at Leyton Orient after it was revealed that Viktor Johansson had injured his shoulder. Simkin went straight into the starting line-up at Hull City and was able to keep a clean sheet as Róbert Boženík scored his first Stoke goal, although he suffered a dislocated shoulder early in the second half, which led to 17 minutes of injury time. Stoke then defeated relegation threatened Norwich City 2–0 with late goals from Gallagher and Thomas. Goalkeeper Gavin Bazunu, joined Stoke on loan for the remainder of the season and he went straight into the starting line-up on as City played out an uneventful goalless draw with Queens Park Rangers where they lost Divin Mubama to a serious ankle injury. The injury crisis continued as Bazunu picked up a thigh injury in training. Simkin came back into the team against promotion chasing Middlesbrough, Stoke taking a first half lead through Tomáš Rigo's first goal in English football but Boro turned the game around in the second half to win by two goals to one. A patched up Stoke team managed to come from a goal behind to draw 1–1 away at Birmingham City. Stoke ended January with a poor performance against Southampton, losing 2–0.

In the Winter transfer window Stoke brought in goalkeeper Gavin Bazunu, wingers Ato Ampah and Jesurun Rak-Sakyi, and Dutch striker Milan Smit, whilst departing the club were Jack Bonham, Jaden Dixon and André Vidigal.

=== February ===
The slide down the table continued with a dour goalless draw at West Bromwich Albion and a narrow defeat at Charlton Athletic. Assistant manager Paul Nevin departed the club on 17 February less than three months after signing a new contract. The first team moved into a new £10 million facility at their Clayton Wood Training Ground. Despite Ben Wilmot giving Stoke an early lead against relegation threatened Leicester City a woeful second half saw them fall 2–1 behind before Wilmot scored again to salvage a 2–2 draw. Stoke ended their winless run with a 2–1 victory over struggling Oxford United with Lamine Cissé and Jesurun Rak-Sakyi, scoring their first Championship goals for the Potters. Stoke looked set for a hard-fought point away at top of the table Coventry City but were defeated by a stoppage time goal at the Coventry Building Society Arena for a second season running.

=== March ===
Stoke slipped to a 2–0 defeat at Swansea City in their next game, as Sorba Thomas was sent-off in the first half for two bookable offences. The Potters then hosted promotion contenders Ipswich Town in a mid-week fixture and took a 2–0 half time lead after Milan Smit scored his first goal in England football and a goal from Bae Jun-ho. However a scored half fight back from Ipswich saw them leading until the final moments when Smit converted a stoppage time penalty to draw the game 3–3. City then defeated Watford 3–1 with a brace from Manhoef and a rare strike from Sam Gallagher. Any faint hopes of launching a late run for the play-offs were all but ended in a poor performance at Preston North End, going down 3–1 despite Thomas giving Stoke an early lead. After the match Mark Robins said the players had let the supporters down.

=== April ===
Over the Easter weekend Stoke beat beleaguered Sheffield Wednesday 2–0, and lost by the same scoreline to play-off chasing Derby County. An equaliser from Rak-Sakyi earned City a point against Michael O'Neill's Blackburn Rovers. Two further defeats against promotion chasing teams, Wrexham and Millwall followed. Stoke lost the final home match of another poor season 3–1 against Portsmouth, prompting an angry reaction from supporters, whilst Mark Robins vowed to "move people on who are mercenary, don't want to train and don't want to work hard".

=== May ===
Goalkeeper Viktor Johansson signed a new four-year contract with Stoke, before the final game of the season. Stoke lost 2–0 to Bristol City to end the 2025–26 season in 17th position, their eighth consecutive bottom half finish.

=== Matches ===
9 August 2025 1	Stoke City	3–1	Derby County	Stoke-on-Trent
15:00 BST	Baker 70'; Mubama 90+5'; Thomas 90+9'	Report	Morris 60'	Stadium: bet365 Stadium; Attendance: 25,746

16 August 2025 2	Sheffield Wednesday	0–3	Stoke City	Sheffield
15:00 BST		Report	Manhoef 2', 69'; Mubama 46'	Stadium: Hillsborough; Attendance: 21,683

23 August 2025 3	Southampton	1–2	Stoke City	Southampton
15:00 BST	Harwood-Bellis 79'	Report	Baker 54'; Thomas 75'	Stadium: St Mary's Stadium; Attendance: 28,922

30 August 2025 4	Stoke City	0–1	West Bromwich Albion	Stoke-on-Trent
12:30 BST		Report	Phillips 14'	Stadium: bet365 Stadium; Attendance: 22,183; Referee: Dean Whitestone

13 September 2025 5	Stoke City	1–0	Birmingham City	Stoke-on-Trent
15:00 BST	Lawal 21'	Report		Stadium: bet365 Stadium; Attendance: 24,676; Referee: Michael Salisbury

20 September 2025 6	Queens Park Rangers	1–0	Stoke City	Shepherd's Bush, London
12:30 BST	Vale 75'	Report		Stadium: Loftus Road; Attendance: 16,481; Referee: Tim Robinson

27 September 2025 7	Stoke City	1–1	Norwich City	Stoke-on-Trent
15:00 BST	Thomas 48'	Report	Makama 26'	Stadium: bet365 Stadium; Attendance: 25,200

30 September 2025 8	Middlesbrough	0–0	Stoke City	Middlesbrough
19:45 BST		Report		Stadium: Riverside Stadium; Attendance: 24,707

4 October 2025 9	Blackburn Rovers	1–1	Stoke City	Blackburn
12:30 BST	Kargbo 82'	Report	Manhoef 49'	Stadium: Ewood Park; Attendance: 14,751

18 October 2025 10	Stoke City	1–0	Wrexham	Stoke-on-Trent
15:00 BST	Thomas 36'	Report		Stadium: bet365 Stadium; Attendance: 27,254

21 October 2025 11	Millwall	2–0	Stoke City	Bermondsey, London
19:45 BST	Azeez 10'; Crama 21'	Report		Stadium: The Den; Attendance: 13,792

25 October 2025 12	Portsmouth	0–1	Stoke City	Portsmouth
12:30 BST		Report	Matthews 70' (o.g.)	Stadium: Fratton Park; Attendance: 20,164

1 November 2025 13	Stoke City	5–1	Bristol City	Stoke-on-Trent
15:00 GMT	Mubama 4', 22', 67'; Manhoef 25'; Tchamadeu 47'	Report	Sykes 82'	Stadium: bet365 Stadium; Attendance: 23,241

4 November 2025 14	Oxford United	0–3	Stoke City	Oxford
19:45 GMT		Report	Baker 10', 48'; Nzonzi 32'	Stadium: Kassam Stadium; Attendance: 10,362

8 November 2025 15	Stoke City	0–1	Coventry City	Stoke-on-Trent
15:00 GMT		Report	Mason-Clark 86'	Stadium: bet365 Stadium; Attendance: 27,421

22 November 2025 16	Leicester City	2–1	Stoke City	Leicester
15:00 GMT	Mavididi 23'; Daka 45'	Report	Bae Jun-ho 48'	Stadium: King Power Stadium; Attendance: 29,897

25 November 2025 17	Stoke City	3–0	Charlton Athletic	Stoke-on-Trent
19:45 GMT	Thomas 3', 34'; Manhoef 5'	Report		Stadium: bet365 Stadium; Attendance: 21,105

29 November 2025 18	Stoke City	1–2	Hull City	Stoke-on-Trent
12:30 GMT	Thomas 17'	Report	Ajayi 48'; Gelhardt 90'	Stadium: bet365 Stadium; Attendance: 22,331

6 December 2025 19	Sheffield United	4–0	Stoke City	Sheffield
15:00 GMT	McGuinness 10'; Seriki 40'; Bamford 44'; Peck 77' (pen.)	Report		Stadium: Bramall Lane; Attendance: 28,044

10 December 2025 20	Ipswich Town	1–0	Stoke City	Ipswich
19:45 GMT	Philogene 2'	Report		Stadium: Portman Road; Attendance: 27,008

13 December 2025 21	Stoke City	2–1	Swansea City	Stoke-on-Trent
12:30 GMT	Pearson 42'; Thomas 60'	Report	Vipotnik 77'	Stadium: bet365 Stadium; Attendance: 23,089

20 December 2025 22	Watford	1–0	Stoke City	Watford
15:00 GMT	Kjerrumgaard 74'	Report		Stadium: Vicarage Road; Attendance: 19,285

26 December 2025 23	Stoke City	0–0	Preston North End	Stoke-on-Trent
15:00 GMT		Report		Stadium: bet365 Stadium; Attendance: 26,314; Referee: Thomas Kirk

29 December 2025 24	Stoke City	1–2	Sheffield United	Stoke-on-Trent
19:45 GMT	Wilmot 65'	Report	Riedewald 47'; Cannon 53'	Stadium: bet365 Stadium; Attendance: 24,206

1 January 2026 25	Hull City	0–1	Stoke City	Kingston upon Hull
15:00 GMT		Report	Boženík 39'	Stadium: MKM Stadium; Attendance: 23,152; Referee: Craig Pawson

4 January 2026 26	Norwich City	0–2	Stoke City	Norwich
15:00 GMT		Report	Gallagher 75'; Thomas 82'	Stadium: Carrow Road; Attendance: 25,656

17 January 2026 27	Stoke City	0–0	Queens Park Rangers	Stoke-on-Trent
15:00 GMT		Report		Stadium: bet365 Stadium; Attendance: 22,045

21 January 2026 28	Stoke City	1–2	Middlesbrough	Stoke-on-Trent
20:00 GMT	Rigo 15'	Report	Browne 48'; Conway 59'	Stadium: bet365 Stadium; Attendance: 20,992; Referee: Adam Herczeg

24 January 2026 29	Birmingham City	1–1	Stoke City	Birmingham
15:00 GMT	Iwata 42'	Report	Neumann 71' (o.g.)	Stadium: St Andrew's; Attendance: 27,904

31 January 2026 30	Stoke City	0–2	Southampton	Stoke-on-Trent
12:30 GMT		Report	Azaz 10'; Downes 52'	Stadium: bet365 Stadium; Attendance: 23,529

7 February 2026 31	West Bromwich Albion	0–0	Stoke City	West Bromwich
15:00 GMT		Report		Stadium: The Hawthorns

11 February 2026 32	Charlton Athletic	1–0	Stoke City	Charlton, London
19:45 GMT	Campbell 81'	Report		Stadium: The Valley; Attendance: 14,836

21 February 2026 33	Stoke City	2–2	Leicester City	Stoke-on-Trent
12:30 GMT	Wilmot 3', 89'	Report	Mukasa 52'; Winks 76'	Stadium: bet365 Stadium; Attendance: 23,997

25 February 2026 34	Stoke City	2–1	Oxford United	Stoke-on-Trent
20:00 GMT	Cissé 36'; Rak-Sakyi 57'	Report	Brown 44'	Stadium: bet365 Stadium; Attendance: 20,153

28 February 2026 35	Coventry City	2–1	Stoke City	Coventry
15:00 GMT	Wright 12'; Rudoni 90+4'	Report	Gibson 45+4'	Stadium: Coventry Building Society Arena; Attendance: 31,516

7 March 2026 36	Swansea City	2–0	Stoke City	Swansea
15:00 GMT	Vipotnik 53'; Cullen 90+2'	Report		Stadium: Swansea.com Stadium

10 March 2026 37	Stoke City	3–3	Ipswich Town	Stoke-on-Trent
20:00 GMT	Smit 35', 90+6' (pen.); Bae Jun-ho 44'	Report	Bocat 49' (o.g.); Taylor 64'; Hirst 82'	Stadium: bet365 Stadium; Attendance: 22,330

14 March 2026 38	Stoke City	3–1	Watford	Stoke-on-Trent
15:00 GMT	Manhoef 28', 77'; Gallagher 85'	Report	Irankunda 81'	Stadium: bet365 Stadium; Attendance: 22,085

20 March 2026 39	Preston North End	3–1	Stoke City	Preston
20:00 GMT	Devine 15', 60'; Osmajić 57'	Report	Thomas 4'	Stadium: Deepdale; Attendance: 16,604

3 April 2026 40	Stoke City	2–0	Sheffield Wednesday	Stoke-on-Trent
15:00 BST	Rak-Sakyi 32'; Cissé 57'	Report		Stadium: bet365 Stadium; Attendance: 25,450

6 April 2026 41	Derby County	2–0	Stoke City	Derby
15:00 BST	Banel 54'; Morris 89'	Report		Stadium: Pride Park; Attendance: 31,095

11 April 2026 42	Stoke City	1–1	Blackburn Rovers	Stoke-on-Trent
15:00 BST	Ribeiro 56' (o.g.)	Report	Forshaw 21'	Stadium: bet365 Stadium; Attendance: 22,718

18 April 2026 43	Wrexham	2–0	Stoke City	Wrexham
15:00 BST	Thomason 31'; Windass 33'	Report		Stadium: Racecourse Ground; Attendance: 10,633

21 April 2026 44	Stoke City	1–3	Millwall	Stoke-on-Trent
19:45 BST	Taylor 60' (o.g.)	Report	Neghli 20'; Azeez 55'; Coburn 69'	Stadium: bet365 Stadium; Attendance: 20,961

25 April 2026 45	Stoke City	1–3	Portsmouth	Stoke-on-Trent
15:00 BST	Cissé 48'	Report	Segečić 32', 66', 82'	Stadium: bet365 Stadium; Attendance: 24,894

2 May 2026 46	Bristol City	2–0	Stoke City	Bristol
12:30 BST	Burgzorg 1'; Bell 88'	Report		Stadium: Ashton Gate; Attendance: 24,671

=== League table ===
Pos	Team	Pld	W	D	L	GF	GA	GD	Pts
15	Queens Park Rangers	46	16	10	20	61	73	−12	58
16	Watford	46	14	15	17	53	65	−12	57
17	Stoke City	46	15	10	21	51	56	−5	55
18	Portsmouth	46	14	13	19	49	64	−15	55
19	Charlton Athletic	46	13	14	19	44	58	−14	53

Source: EFL Official Website
Rules for classification: 1) Points; 2) Goal difference; 3) Number of goals scored; 4) Head-to-head results; 5) Wins; 6) Away goals; 7) Penalty points (sec 9.5); 8) Number of 12-point sending off offences; 9) Play-off (only if needed to determine promotion/relegation)

=== Results by round ===
Round	1	2	3	4	5	6	7	8	9	10	11	12	13	14	15	16	17	18	19	20	21	22	23	24	25	26	27	28	29	30	31	32	33	34	35	36	37	38	39	40	41	42	43	44	45	46
Ground	H	A	A	H	H	A	H	A	A	H	A	A	H	A	H	A	H	H	A	A	H	A	H	H	A	A	H	H	A	H	A	A	H	H	A	A	H	H	A	H	A	H	A	H	H	A
Result	W	W	W	L	W	L	D	D	D	W	L	W	W	W	L	L	W	L	L	L	W	L	D	L	W	W	D	L	D	L	D	L	D	W	L	L	D	W	L	W	L	D	L	L	L	L
Position	2	1	1	3	2	2	3	3	5	3	6	5	3	2	3	3	2	4	6	8	7	8	10	10	9	8	7	8	10	12	13	14	16	13	14	15	16	13	15	12	13	16	17	17	17	17
Points	3	6	9	9	12	12	13	14	15	18	18	21	24	27	27	27	30	30	30	30	33	33	34	34	37	40	41	41	42	42	43	43	44	47	47	47	48	51	51	54	54	55	55	55	55	55

Source: Soccerway
A = Away; H = Home; W = Win; D = Draw; L = Loss

== FA Cup ==
Stoke were drawn at home to Coventry City in the third round and to Fulham in the fourth round.

10 January 2026 Third round	Stoke City	1–0	Coventry City	Stoke-on-Trent
15:00 GMT	Cissé 88'	Report		Stadium: bet365 Stadium; Attendance: 13,894

15 February 2026 Fourth round	Stoke City	1–2	Fulham	Stoke-on-Trent
14:00 GMT	Bae Jun-ho 19'	Report	Kevin 55'; Reed 84'	Stadium: bet365 Stadium; Attendance: 14,871; Referee: Josh Smith

== EFL Cup ==
Stoke were drawn at home to Walsall in the first round and to Bradford City in the second round.

12 August 2025 First round	Stoke City	0–0 (4–3 p)	Walsall	Stoke-on-Trent
19:45 BST		Report		Stadium: bet365 Stadium; Attendance: 8,809
	Penalties
	Baker (penalty scored); Donley (penalty scored); Mubama (penalty missed); Bae Jun-ho (penalty scored); Bonham (penalty scored)		Matt (penalty scored); Stuttle (penalty missed); Flint (penalty scored); Jellis (penalty scored); Adomah (penalty missed)

26 August 2025 Second round	Stoke City	0–3	Bradford City	Stoke-on-Trent
19:45 BST		Report	Swan 12'; Halliday 31'; Lapslie 61'	Stadium: bet365 Stadium; Attendance: 9,947

== Squad statistics ==
As of match played 2 May 2026

No.	Pos.	Name	Championship		FA Cup		EFL Cup		Total		Discipline	
No.	Pos.	Name	Apps	Goals	Apps	Goals	Apps	Goals	Apps	Goals	Yellow card	Red card
1	GK	(Sweden) Viktor Johansson	25	0	0	0	0	0	25	0	2	0
3	DF	(England) Aaron Cresswell	22(3)	0	0(1)	0	0	0	22(4)	0	2	0
4	MF	(England) Ben Pearson	22(9)	1	1(1)	0	1	0	24(10)	1	12	1
7	MF	(Wales) Sorba Thomas	45	10	1(1)	0	0	0	46(1)	10	9	1
8	MF	(England) Lewis Baker	14(3)	4	0	0	0(1)	0	14(4)	4	3	0
9	FW	(England) Divin Mubama	20(6)	5	1	0	0(1)	0	21(7)	5	2	1
10	MF	(South Korea) Bae Jun-ho	32(10)	2	1(1)	1	0(1)	0	33(11)	3	2	0
11	FW	(Slovakia) Róbert Boženík	9(13)	1	0	0	2	0	11(13)	1	2	0
12	MF	(Japan) Tatsuki Seko	26(17)	0	2	0	1(1)	0	29(18)	0	5	0
13	GK	(Republic of Ireland) Jack Bonham	0	0	0	0	2	0	2	0	0	0
14	MF	(England) Ato Ampah	0	0	0	0	0	0	0	0	0	0
14	MF	(Northern Ireland) Jamie Donley	0(4)	0	0	0	2	0	2(4)	0	0	0
15	MF	(France) Steven Nzonzi	17(13)	1	0(1)	0	0	0	17(14)	1	2	0
16	DF	(England) Ben Wilmot	33(1)	3	2	0	0(1)	0	35(2)	3	5	0
17	DF	(France) Eric Bocat	21(8)	0	1	0	2	0	24(8)	0	0	0
18	MF	(Republic of Ireland) Bosun Lawal	25(2)	1	1	0	2	0	28(2)	1	6	1
19	MF	(Slovakia) Tomáš Rigo	20(11)	1	2	0	0	0	22(11)	1	2	0
20	FW	(England) Sam Gallagher	4(15)	2	0(1)	0	0	0	4(16)	2	0	0
21	MF	(England) Jesurun Rak-Sakyi	8(7)	2	0(1)	0	0	0	8(8)	2	3	0
22	DF	(Cameroon) Junior Tchamadeu	23(3)	1	0	0	0	0	23(3)	1	12	0
23	DF	(England) Ben Gibson	7(6)	1	0	0	1(1)	0	8(7)	1	1	0
25	GK	(England) Tommy Simkin	15	0	2	0	0	0	17	0	2	0
26	DF	(England) Ashley Phillips	36(4)	0	2	0	2	0	40(4)	0	4	1
29	FW	(France) Lamine Cissé	19(15)	3	2	1	0	0	21(15)	4	5	0
31	GK	(Republic of Ireland) Gavin Bazunu	6	0	0	0	0	0	6	0	0	0
34	GK	(England) Frank Fielding	0	0	0	0	0	0	0	0	0	0
40	DF	(Ukraine) Maksym Talovierov	13(3)	0	2	0	1	0	16(3)	0	8	0
42	FW	(Netherlands) Million Manhoef	33(12)	7	1(1)	0	1	0	35(13)	7	3	0
46	MF	(England) Will Smith	0	0	0	0	0(2)	0	0(2)	0	0	0
49	FW	(Netherlands) Milan Smit	6(7)	2	1	0	0	0	7(7)	2	0	0
50	DF	(Kenya) Sydney Agina	3(2)	0	0	0	0	0	3(2)	0	1	0
54	DF	(Republic of Ireland) Raphael-Pijus Otegbayo	2(1)	0	0	0	0	0	2(1)	0	0	0
56	MF	(England) Favour Fawunmi	0(2)	0	0	0	2	0	2(2)	0	1	0
57	DF	(England) Jaden Mears	0	0	0	0	2	0	2	0	0	0
58	MF	(England) Chinonso Chibueze	0	0	0	0	1	0	1	0	0	0
Own goals			—	4	—	0	—	0	—	4	—	

== Transfers ==
=== In ===
Date	Pos.	Name	From	Fee	Ref.
7 June 2025	MF	(Wales) Sorba Thomas	(England) Huddersfield Town	Undisclosed	
5 July 2025	DF	(Ukraine) Maksym Talovierov	(England) Plymouth Argyle	Undisclosed	
10 July 2025	DF	(England) Aaron Cresswell	(England) West Ham United	Free	
24 July 2025	FW	(Slovakia) Róbert Boženík	(Portugal) Boavista	Undisclosed	
8 August 2025	MF	(France) Steven Nzonzi	(Iran) Sepahan	Free	
14 August 2025	FW	(France) Lamine Cissé	(France) Bastia	Undisclosed	
15 August 2025	GK	(England) Caleb Clothier	(Switzerland) Zürich	Free	
15 August 2025	FW	(England) Jerome Osei	(England) Crystal Palace	Free	
25 August 2025	GK	(England) True Grant	(England) Manchester City	Undisclosed	
30 August 2025	MF	(Slovakia) Tomáš Rigo	(Czech Republic) Baník Ostrava	Undisclosed	
2 February 2026	MF	(England) Ato Ampah	(England) Chelsea	Undisclosed	
2 February 2026	FW	(England) Tyler Martin	(England) Liverpool	Free	

=== Out ===
Date	Pos.	Name	To	Fee	Ref.
25 June 2024	FW	(England) Niall Ennis	(England) Blackpool	Undisclosed	
30 June 2024	FW	(England) Dean Adekoya	Unattached	Released	
30 June 2024	GK	(England) Alfie Brooks	(England) AFC Telford United	Released	
30 June 2024	DF	(United States) Lynden Gooch	(England) Huddersfield Town	Released	
30 June 2024	MF	(England) Jack Griffiths	Unattached	Released	
30 June 2024	DF	(Republic of Ireland) Christy Grogan	(England) Stockport County	Released	
30 June 2024	FW	(England) Keke Jeffers	Unattached	Released	
30 June 2024	DF	(Scotland) Michael Rose	(England) Salford City	Released	
30 June 2024	DF	(Republic of Ireland) Enda Stevens	Unattached	Released	
30 June 2024	MF	(Northern Ireland) Jordan Thompson	(England) Preston North End	Released	
22 July 2025	MF	(Netherlands) Wouter Burger	(Germany) TSG 1899 Hoffenheim	Undisclosed	
1 August 2025	MF	(England) Sol Sidibe	(Netherlands) PSV Eindhoven	Undisclosed	
20 August 2025	FW	(Morocco) Ryan Mmaee	(Cyprus) Omonia	Mutual Consent	
9 January 2026	FW	(Portugal) André Vidigal	Unattached	Mutual Consent	
14 January 2026	GK	(Republic of Ireland) Jack Bonham	(England) Bolton Wanderers	Undisclosed	
2 February 2026	DF	(England) Jaden Dixon	(England) Arsenal	Undisclosed	
2 February 2026	FW	(England) Lewis Bailey	(England) Southampton	Undisclosed	

=== Loans in ===
Date from	Pos.	Name	From	Date to	Ref.
5 July 2025	FW	(England) Divin Mubama	(England) Manchester City	31 May 2026	
23 July 2025	DF	(England) Ashley Phillips	(England) Tottenham Hotspur	31 May 2026	
6 August 2025	MF	(Northern Ireland) Jamie Donley	(England) Tottenham Hotspur	1 January 2026 (Note: On 1 January, Donley was recalled to his parent club Tottenham Hotspur and loaned to Oxford United)	
13 January 2026	GK	(Republic of Ireland) Gavin Bazunu	(England) Southampton	31 May 2026	
25 January 2026	FW	(Netherlands) Milan Smit	(Netherlands) Go Ahead Eagles	31 May 2026 (Note: Conditional obligation to buy when loan deal ends)	
2 February 2026	FW	(England) Jesurun Rak-Sakyi	(England) Crystal Palace	31 May 2026	

=== Loans out ===
Date from	Pos.	Name	To	Date until	Ref
15 July 2025	MF	(Republic of Ireland) Darius Lipsiuc	(England) Solihull Moors	31 May 2026 (Note: On 5 January, Lipsiuc's loan at Solihull was extended until the end of the season)	
18 July 2025	GK	(England) Tommy Simkin	(England) Leyton Orient	1 January 2026 (Note: On 1 January, Simkin was recalled by Stoke)	
24 July 2025	FW	(England) Emre Tezgel	(England) Crewe Alexandra	31 May 2026	
29 July 2025	MF	(Poland) Wiktor Gromek	(Poland) Jastrzębie	4 January 2026	
29 July 2025	FW	(Serbia) Nikola Jojić	(Slovenia) Radomlje	31 May 2026	
30 July 2025	FW	(England) Nathan Lowe	(England) Stockport County	6 January 2026 (Note: On 6 January, Lowe's season-long loan at Stockport was terminated due to injury)	
22 August 2025	FW	(England) Pedro Nzau	(England) Mickleover	20 September 2025	
30 August 2025	DF	(Republic of Ireland) Jake Griffin	(England) FC Halifax Town	27 September 2025	
5 September 2025	FW	(England) Adriel Walker	(England) Forest Green Rovers	31 October 2025	
26 December 2025	FW	(England) Adriel Walker	(England) Buxton	23 January 2026	
8 January 2026	DF	(United States) Freddie Anderson	(England) Barrow	30 June 2026	
16 January 2026	MF	(Scotland) Kieron Willox	(Scotland) Inverness Caledonian Thistle	30 June 2026	
30 January 2026	FW	(England) Nathan Lowe	(England) Wycombe Wanderers	30 June 2026	
2 February 2026	FW	(England) Favour Fawunmi	(England) Leyton Orient	30 June 2026 (Note: On 2 April, Fawunmi's loan at Leyton Orient was terminated due to injury)	
20 February 2026	MF	(England) Ruben Curley	(England) Curzon Ashton	30 June 2026	
