= Sorba Thomas =

Wales international footballer (born 1999)

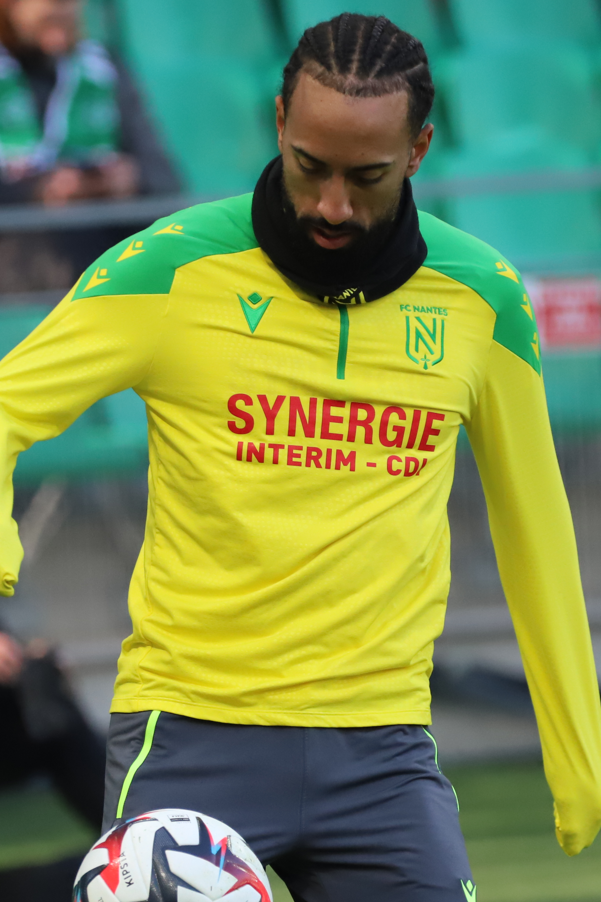
- Thomas with Nantes in 2025

Personal information
- Full name: Benjamin Sorba William Thomas
- Date of birth: 25 January 1999 (age 27)
- Place of birth: Barking, England
- Height: 1.85 m (6 ft 1 in)
- Position: Left winger

Team information
- Current team: Hull City
- Number: 7

Youth career
- 2012–2015: West Ham United
- 2015–2017: Boreham Wood

Senior career*
Years	Team	Apps	(Gls)
2016–2021	Boreham Wood	77	(8)
2018	→ Cheshunt (loan)	2	(0)
2021–2025	Huddersfield Town	114	(7)
2023	→ Blackburn Rovers (loan)	17	(0)
2024–2025	→ Nantes (loan)	25	(1)
2025–2026	Stoke City	48	(10)
2026–	Hull City	1	(0)

International career^{‡}
2021–	Wales	32	(3)
- * Club domestic league appearances and goals as of 13:23, 29 August 2026 (UTC) ‡ National team caps and goals as of 22:14, 17 November 2026 (UTC)

Benjamin Sorba William Thomas (born 25 January 1999) is a professional footballer who plays as a left winger for Premier League club Hull City. Born in England, he plays for the Wales national team.

After leaving the West Ham United Academy at 16, Thomas played for National League side Boreham Wood until he was signed by Championship side Huddersfield Town in January 2021. Thomas helped the Terriers reach the 2022 EFL Championship play-off final, losing to Nottingham Forest. He spent time out on loan at Blackburn Rovers and French Ligue 1 side Nantes before joining Stoke City in June 2025.

== Club career ==
=== Early life & career ===
Thomas was born in Barking, London and attended St Margaret's Primary School and Eastbury Community School. He played football for Barking & Dagenham District Schools team. He began playing at West Ham United's Academy before being released at 16.

=== Boreham Wood ===
Thomas joined the youth academy of Boreham Wood at the age of 16. He began his senior career at Boreham Wood aged 17. He was an instrumental part of the under-18 side that reached the FA Youth Cup second round in 2016–17, which included a win over English Football League side Northampton Town. In January 2018, he spent a month on loan at Isthmian League North side Cheshunt. Whilst in the youth team at Boreham Wood, Thomas worked at JD Sports in Oxford Circus and also as a scaffolder. Thomas made his debut in the first team in September 2017 and came on as a substitute in the 2018 National League play-off final as Boreham Wood lost 2–1 to Tranmere Rovers. He became a regular under Luke Garrard in 2018–19 and 2019–20. His performances attracted the attentions of English Football League clubs and in January 2021 a bid was accepted by Boreham Wood from Huddersfield Town.

=== Huddersfield Town ===
On 13 January 2021, Thomas signed a contract with Huddersfield Town until the end of 2023–24 season with the club having the option of a further year's extension. He made his professional debut for Huddersfield in a 3–2 EFL Championship loss to Wycombe Wanderers on 13 February 2021. In the first Championship game of the 2021–22 season, a 1–1 draw with Derby County on 7 August 2021, Thomas got his first assist, supplying a cross from a free kick which was headed in by Naby Sarr. In the following game, a 5–1 home defeat to Fulham, he overhit a backpass which ultimately resulted in Fulham's opening goal, but later provided the assist for Huddersfield's only goal from a corner kick, Matty Pearson scoring with a header. On 28 August 2021, he scored his first goal (as well as providing two assists) in a 4–0 home victory against Reading: he took possession of the ball at the halfway line, dribbled into the penalty area and placed a low shot past the goalkeeper. On 10 September 2021, Thomas was awarded EFL Championship Player of the Month for August 2021. On 19 May 2022, one week before the 2022 EFL Championship play-off final, Thomas signed a new long-term contract with the club until summer 2026 with the club option to extend for a further year. Huddersfield lost the final 1–0 to Nottingham Forest.

In 2022–23 Huddersfield struggled at the lower end of the Championship, and on 25 January 2023, Thomas joined play-off chasing Blackburn Rovers on loan for the remainder of the 2022–23 season. He played 17 times for Rovers as they missed out on a top six finish on goal difference. Thomas was a regular back at Huddersfield in 2023–24, making 42 appearances, as the Terriers suffered relegation to League One. On 30 July 2024, Thomas joined French Ligue 1 club Nantes on loan for the 2024–25 season. Thomas played 27 times for Les Canaris, scoring once in a 2–2 draw against Saint-Étienne on 29 September 2024.

=== Stoke City ===
Thomas joined Stoke City on 7 June 2025, signing a three-year contract for an undisclosed fee. He scored on his debut in a 3–1 victory over Derby County on 9 August 2025. Thomas became a key player in the team under Mark Robins as Stoke made a good start of the 2025–26 season and were in play-off contention up until December 2025.He played 34 times in 2025–26, scoring four goals as Stoke finished in 17th. Thomas scored twice in a 3–0 win against Charlton Athletic on 25 November 2025 with both his goals being attempted crosses. In the second half of the campaign Stoke lost their form and drifted down the table and ended up finishing in 17th position. Thomas ended the season with ten goals from 47 appearances and provided 12 assists and was voted Player of the Year. He was also included the 2025–26 EFL Championship Team of the Season.

=== Hull City ===
On 1 September 2026, Thomas joined Premier League newcomers Hull City for an undisclosed fee, signing a four-year contract.

== International career ==
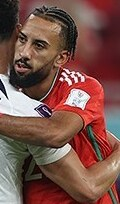
Thomas playing for Wales at the 2022 FIFA World Cup.

In March 2020, Thomas was called up to the England C team for the first time for a fixture against Wales C team however this match was postponed due to the COVID-19 pandemic.

On 28 September 2021, Thomas was called up into the senior Wales squad for the first time for their 2022 World Cup qualifiers against Czech Republic and Estonia. He made his international debut for Wales on 8 October 2021 as a second-half substitute in the 2–2 draw against Czech Republic, and completed his first full 90 minutes three days later in the match against Estonia. In November 2022 he was named in the Wales squad for the 2022 FIFA World Cup in Qatar. Thomas scored his first goal for Wales on 9 June 2025 in the 4-3 World Cup Qualifying match defeat to Belgium.

== Personal life ==
Thomas was born in England to a Sierra Leonean father and Welsh mother. He qualifies to play for Wales through his mother who was born in Newport. Thomas was involved in a single vehicle crash close to Hull City's training ground on the morning of 11 September 2026 and was unharmed.

== Career statistics ==
=== Club ===
As of match played 29 August 2026

Appearances and goals by club, season and competition
Club	Season	League			National cup (Note: Includes FA Cup, Coupe de France)		League cup (Note: Includes EFL Cup)		Other		Total	
Club	Season	Division	Apps	Goals	Apps	Goals	Apps	Goals	Apps	Goals	Apps	Goals
Boreham Wood	2017–18	National League	3	0	0	0	—		5 (Note: Two appearances in National League play-offs, one appearance in FA Trophy; two appearances in Hertfordshire Senior Cup)	0	8	0
Boreham Wood	2018–19	National League	32	0	2	0	—		3 (Note: Two appearances in FA Trophy; one appearance in Scottish Challenge Cup)	0	37	0
Boreham Wood	2019–20	National League	32	5	1	0	—		3 (Note: Two appearances in National League play-offs; one appearance in FA Trophy)	0	36	5
Boreham Wood	2020–21	National League	10	3	4	0	—		0	0	14	3
Boreham Wood	Total		77	8	7	0	—		11	0	95	8
Cheshunt (loan)	2017–18	Isthmian League North	2	0	—		—		—		2	0
Huddersfield Town	2020–21	Championship	7	0	—		—		—		7	0
Huddersfield Town	2021–22	Championship	43	3	3	0	2	0	3 (Note: Appearance(s) in Championship play-offs)	0	51	3
Huddersfield Town	2022–23	Championship	23	0	1	0	1	0	—		25	0
Huddersfield Town	2023–24	Championship	41	4	1	0	0	0	—		42	4
Huddersfield Town	2024–25	League One	0	0	0	0	0	0	0	0	0	0
Huddersfield Town	Total		114	7	5	0	3	0	3	0	125	7
Blackburn Rovers (loan)	2022–23	Championship	17	0	0	0	0	0	—		17	0
Nantes (loan)	2024–25	Ligue 1	25	1	2	0	—		—		27	1
Stoke City	2025–26	Championship	45	10	2	0	0	0	—		47	10
Stoke City	2026–27	Championship	3	0	0	0	2	0	—		5	0
Stoke City	Total		48	10	2	0	2	0	0	0	52	10
Hull City	2026–27	Premier League	0	0	0	0	0	0	—		0	0
Career total			283	25	16	0	5	0	14	0	318	26

=== International ===
As of match played 17 November 2026

Appearances and goals by national team and year
National team	Year	Apps	Goals
Wales	2021	2	0
Wales	2022	5	0
Wales	2023	1	0
Wales	2024	6	0
Wales	2025	9	1
Wales	2026	9	2
Total		32	3

Scores and results list Wales' goal tally first.

List of international goals scored by Sorba Thomas
No.	Date	Venue	Cap	Opponent	Score	Result	Competition
1	9 June 2025	King Baudouin Stadium, Brussels, Belgium	18	Belgium	2–3	3–4	2026 FIFA World Cup qualification
2	31 March 2026	Cardiff City Stadium, Cardiff, Wales	25	Northern Ireland	1–1	1–1	Friendly
3	17 November 2026	Cardiff City Stadium, Cardiff, Wales	32	Portugal	2–1	2–3	2026–27 UEFA Nations League A

== Honours ==
Individual

- EFL Championship Player of the Month: August 2021
- EFL Championship Team of the Year: 2025–26
- Stoke City Player of the Year: 2025–26

== See also ==
- List of Wales international footballers born outside Wales
