= Ben Pearson (footballer) =

English footballer

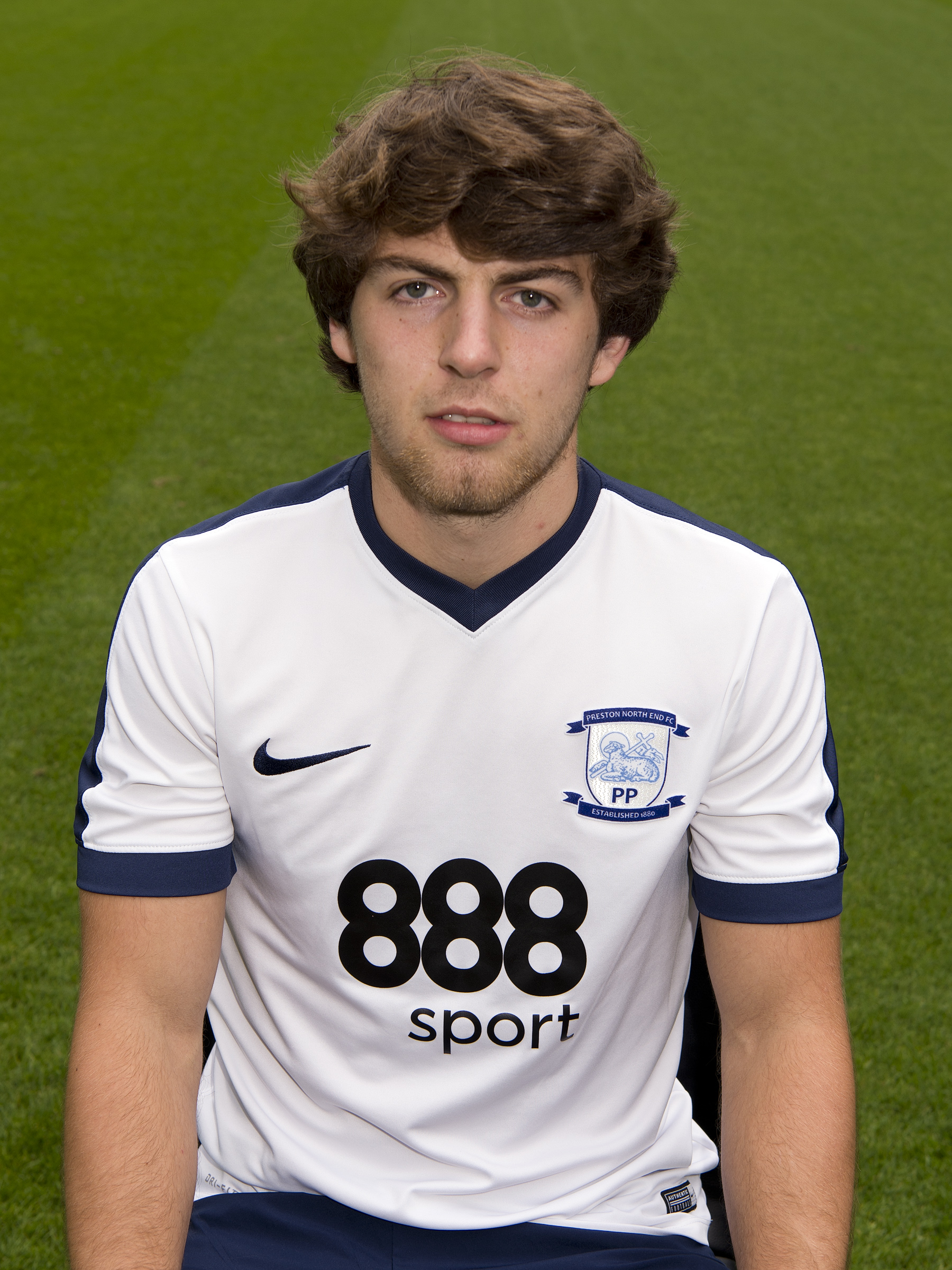
- Pearson with Preston North End in 2016

Personal information
- Full name: Benjamin David Pearson
- Date of birth: 4 January 1995 (age 31)
- Place of birth: Oldham, England
- Height: 5 ft 9 in (1.76 m)
- Position: Midfielder

Team information
- Current team: Stoke City
- Number: 4

Youth career
- –2004: Boundary Park Juniors
- 2004–2014: Manchester United

Senior career*
| Years | Team | Apps | (Gls) |
| 2014–2016 | Manchester United | 0 | (0) |
| 2015–2016 | → Barnsley (loan) | 45 | (2) |
| 2016–2021 | Preston North End | 158 | (2) |
| 2021–2023 | AFC Bournemouth | 46 | (0) |
| 2023 | → Stoke City (loan) | 14 | (0) |
| 2023– | Stoke City | 75 | (1) |

International career
| 2011 | England U16 | 4 | (0) |
| 2011 | England U17 | 4 | (0) |
| 2013 | England U18 | 1 | (0) |
| 2013 | England U19 | 8 | (2) |
| 2014 | England U20 | 1 | (0) |
- * Club domestic league appearances and goals as of 15:58, 12 September 2026 (UTC)

Benjamin David Pearson (born 4 January 1995) is an English professional footballer at EFL Championship club Stoke City.

Pearson began his career at Manchester United's academy. He spent time out on loan at Barnsley, before signing for Preston North End in January 2016. Pearson spent five years at Deepdale before joining AFC Bournemouth in January 2021. He helped the Cherries gain promotion to the Premier League in the 2021–22 season. In January 2023, he joined Stoke City on a five-month loan before making it permanent in the summer of 2023.

He has also represented England at youth international level, playing for the under-16s, under-17s, under-18s, under-19s and under-20s.

== Club career ==
=== Manchester United ===
Pearson was born in Oldham, and attended Christ Church Primary School and Crompton House CE School. After playing youth football with Boundary Park Juniors he joined Manchester United's academy as a nine-year-old in July 2004. Pearson was a regular for the Manchester United under-18s, and his performances earned him the Jimmy Murphy Young Player of the Year award for 2012–13.

Pearson joined League One side Barnsley on a one-month loan on 8 January 2015. Two days later, he made his professional debut, playing the full 90 minutes of a 2–0 home win over Yeovil Town. He scored his first senior goal in Barnsley's game at home to Port Vale on 31 January, scoring their second just after half-time in a 2–1 win. His loan spell was extended by one month in February 2015 and on 9 March 2015 it was confirmed that he would remain at Barnsley until the end of the 2014–15 season. Pearson re-joined Barnsley on a six-month loan deal on 18 July 2015. Pearson made 29 appearances for the Tykes in 2015–16 before returning to Manchester United in January 2016.

=== Preston North End ===
On 11 January 2016, he signed for Championship side Preston North End for an undisclosed fee. He made 15 appearances in the remainder of the 2015–16 season as North End finished in 11th. Pearson scored his first goal for the club on 1 October 2016, opening the scoring in a 2–0 victory over Aston Villa. He signed a new three-and-a-half-year contract with Preston in December 2016. In 2016–17 Preston again finished in 11th position with Pearson missing six matches due being shown a yellow card 16 times. He was sent-off for the first time in his career in a goalless draw at Leeds United on 12 August 2017. In October 2017 Pearson signed another contract extension until summer 2021. Pearson was booked 15 times in 35 appearances in 2017–18 as North End missed out on a play-off spot on the final day of the season.

Pearson's disciplinary problems continued in 2018–19 as he picked up 14 yellow cards and was sent-off on three occasions with Pearson stating that his mother had stopped coming to watch him play. His discipline improved in 2019–20 and he was able to make 38 appearances as Preston ended up four points off a play-off spot in ninth. Pearson picked up an ankle injury in December 2020.

=== AFC Bournemouth ===
Pearson joined AFC Bournemouth for an undisclosed fee on 29 January 2021, signing a three-and-a-half-year contract. Pearson made 20 appearances for the Cherries in 2020–21 as they finished in sixth place but lost in the Championship play-offs to Brentford. The 2021–22 season was a far more successful season for Bournemouth as they gained promotion to the Premier League in 2nd place. Pearson made 26 appearances with most of them coming from the substitute bench as he was behind Philip Billing, Lewis Cook and Jefferson Lerma in the pecking order. Pearson was unable to force his way into the team following promotion was made available for loan by Gary O'Neil in January 2023.

=== Stoke City ===
Pearson joined Stoke City on loan for the remainder of the 2022–23 season on 31 January 2023, linking up with former Preston manager Alex Neil. Pearson made 14 appearances for Stoke, as the team finished in 16th position. Pearson completed a permanent move to Stoke on 8 July 2023, signing a four-year contract for an undisclosed fee. Pearson was booked ten times before December 2023, resulting in a three-match ban. He played 32 times in 2023–24 as Stoke avoided relegation. Pearson's season was ended early due to a hamstring injury. He underwent hamstring surgery in June 2024 meaning he missed the start of the 2024–25 season. He made his return from injury ten months later in February 2025. He went on to play 14 times in 2024–25 as Stoke avoided relegation on the final day. Pearson scored his first goal for Stoke in a 2–1 victory against Swansea City on 13 December 2025. Pearson made 34 appearances in 2025–26, as Stoke finished in 17th position.

== International career ==
Pearson made his international debut for the England Under-16s in a 2–1 win at home to Scotland on 30 March 2011. He made three more appearances for the Under-16s, against Uruguay, the United Arab Emirates and Guinea. Before the end of the year, he made four appearances for the Under-17s, including wins over Italy and the Netherlands. Pearson was called-up to the England Under-18s in March 2013, he was asked to lead the national team for their 1–0 defeat away to Belgium on 30 March. He only made the one appearance for the Under-18s before making the step up to Under-19 level in May 2013, making his debut against Georgia on 24 May. He played in all three of England's qualifying round matches ahead of the 2014 UEFA European Under-19 Championship, scoring twice in a 7–0 win over Andorra as England finished top of their group ahead of Switzerland and Slovenia. He made one appearance for the England Under-20s in October 2014, a 3–2 win over the Netherlands, in which he was substituted by Harrison Reed in the first minute of injury time.

== Career statistics ==
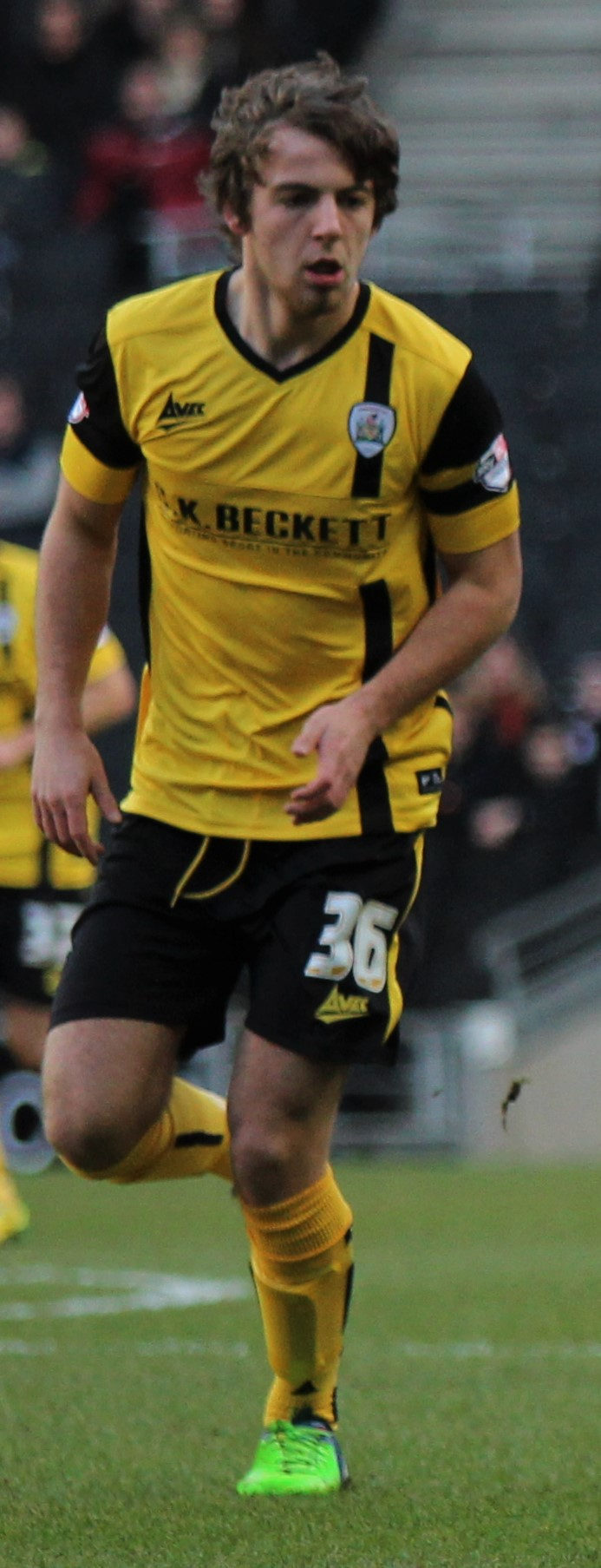
Pearson playing for Barnsley in January 2015.

As of match played 12 September 2026

Appearances and goals by club, season and competition
| Club | Season | League | | | FA Cup | | League Cup | | Other | | Total | |
| Club | Season | Division | Apps | Goals | Apps | Goals | Apps | Goals | Apps | Goals | Apps | Goals |
|---|---|---|---|---|---|---|---|---|---|---|---|---|
| Manchester United | 2014–15 | Premier League | 0 | 0 | 0 | 0 | 0 | 0 | — | | 0 | 0 |
| Manchester United | 2015–16 | Premier League | 0 | 0 | 0 | 0 | 0 | 0 | 0 | 0 | 0 | 0 |
| Manchester United | Total | | 0 | 0 | 0 | 0 | 0 | 0 | 0 | 0 | 0 | 0 |
| Barnsley (loan) | 2014–15 | League One | 22 | 1 | 0 | 0 | 0 | 0 | — | | 22 | 1 |
| Barnsley (loan) | 2015–16 | League One | 23 | 1 | 1 | 0 | 2 | 0 | 3 (Note: Appearances in EFL Trophy) | 1 | 29 | 2 |
| Barnsley (loan) | Total | | 45 | 2 | 1 | 0 | 2 | 0 | 3 | 1 | 51 | 3 |
| Preston North End | 2015–16 | Championship | 15 | 0 | 0 | 0 | 0 | 0 | — | | 15 | 0 |
| Preston North End | 2016–17 | Championship | 31 | 1 | 1 | 0 | 2 | 0 | — | | 34 | 1 |
| Preston North End | 2017–18 | Championship | 35 | 0 | 0 | 0 | 0 | 0 | — | | 35 | 0 |
| Preston North End | 2018–19 | Championship | 30 | 0 | 0 | 0 | 2 | 0 | — | | 32 | 0 |
| Preston North End | 2019–20 | Championship | 38 | 1 | 0 | 0 | 0 | 0 | — | | 38 | 1 |
| Preston North End | 2020–21 | Championship | 9 | 0 | 0 | 0 | 2 | 0 | — | | 11 | 0 |
| Preston North End | Total | | 158 | 2 | 1 | 0 | 6 | 0 | — | | 165 | 2 |
| Bournemouth | 2020–21 | Championship | 16 | 0 | 2 | 0 | 0 | 0 | 2 (Note: Two appearances in the Championship play-offs) | 0 | 20 | 0 |
| Bournemouth | 2021–22 | Championship | 23 | 0 | 2 | 0 | 1 | 0 | — | | 26 | 0 |
| Bournemouth | 2022–23 | Premier League | 7 | 0 | 0 | 0 | 2 | 0 | — | | 9 | 0 |
| Bournemouth | Total | | 46 | 0 | 4 | 0 | 3 | 0 | 2 | 0 | 55 | 0 |
| Stoke City (loan) | 2022–23 | Championship | 14 | 0 | 0 | 0 | 0 | 0 | — | | 14 | 0 |
| Stoke City | 2023–24 | Championship | 29 | 0 | 0 | 0 | 3 | 0 | — | | 32 | 0 |
| Stoke City | 2024–25 | Championship | 13 | 0 | 1 | 0 | 0 | 0 | — | | 14 | 0 |
| Stoke City | 2025–26 | Championship | 31 | 1 | 2 | 0 | 1 | 0 | — | | 34 | 1 |
| Stoke City | 2026–27 | Championship | 2 | 0 | 0 | 0 | 1 | 0 | — | | 3 | 0 |
| Stoke City | Total | | 89 | 1 | 3 | 0 | 5 | 0 | — | | 97 | 1 |
| Career total | | | 338 | 5 | 9 | 0 | 16 | 0 | 5 | 1 | 368 | 6 |

== Honours ==
AFC Bournemouth

- Championship runner-up: 2021–22

Individual

- Jimmy Murphy Young Player of the Year: 2012–13
