= Jaden Dixon =

English footballer (born 2007)

Personal information
- Full name: Jaden Benjamin James Dixon
- Date of birth: 7 May 2007 (age 19)
- Place of birth: Havering, England
- Positions: Centre-back; right-back

Team information
- Current team: Arsenal
- Number: 40

Youth career
- –2022: Tottenham Hotspur
- 2022–2026: Stoke City

Senior career*
Years	Team	Apps	(Gls)
2024–2026	Stoke City	2	(0)
2026–	Arsenal	0	(0)

International career^{‡}
2024	England U17	2	(0)
2024–	England U18	11	(0)
2025–	England U19	5	(0)
- * Club domestic league appearances and goals as of 16:53, 3 June 2025 (UTC) ‡ National team caps and goals as of 09:56, 16 October 2025 (UTC)

Jaden Benjamin James Dixon (born 7 May 2007) is an English professional footballer who plays as a centre-back or right-back for Premier League club Arsenal.

== Club career ==
=== Stoke City ===
Dixon joined Stoke City from Tottenham Hotspur in the summer of 2022. He commented that he was helped by the coaching of Ryan Shawcross. He captained the Stoke U21 side at times during the 2023–24 season. He signed his first professional contract with the club in May 2024, agreeing to a three-year deal. Dixon made his professional debut in the EFL Cup against Carlisle United on 13 August 2024.

=== Arsenal ===
On 2 February 2026, Dixon joined Premier League side Arsenal for an undisclosed fee.

== International career ==
Born in England, Dixon is of Jamaican descent through his father and Turkish Cypriot descent through his mother. He made his international debut for the England U17s in European U17 Championship qualifiers in March 2024 against Northern Ireland U17. He was included in the squad for the 2024 UEFA European Under-17 Championship and made his only appearance of the tournament as a substitute in their opening game against France.

On 4 September 2024, Dixon made his England U18 debut against Portugal in Limoges.

Dixon made his U19 debut during a 2–0 win over Ukraine at Pinatar Arena on 3 September 2025.

== Career statistics ==
As of match played 7 March 2026

Appearances and goals by club, season and competition
Club	Season	League			FA Cup		EFL Cup		Europe		Other		Total	
Club	Season	Division	Apps	Goals	Apps	Goals	Apps	Goals	Apps	Goals	Apps	Goals	Apps	Goals
Stoke City	2024–25	Championship	2	0	0	0	4	0	—		—		6	0
Stoke City	2025–26	Championship	0	0	0	0	0	0	—		—		0	0
Stoke City	Total		2	0	0	0	4	0	—		—		6	0
Arsenal	2025–26	Premier League	0	0	1	0	0	0	0	0	—		1	0
Career total			2	0	1	0	4	0	0	0	0	0	7	0
