= Eric Bocat =

French footballer (born 1999)

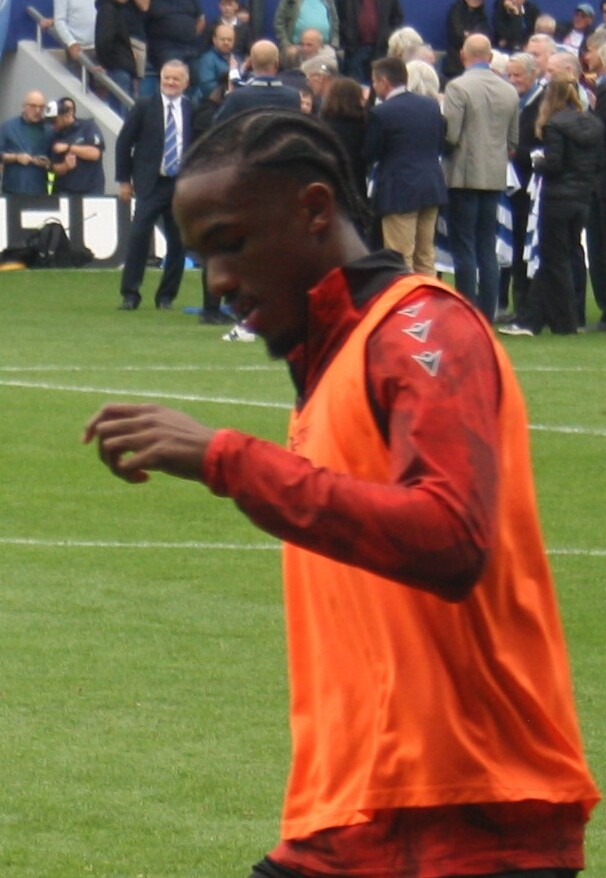
- Bocat in 2025

Personal information
- Full name: Eric-Junior Doriane Magate Kom Baga Bocat
- Date of birth: 16 July 1999 (age 27)
- Place of birth: Paris, France
- Height: 1.82 m (6 ft 0 in)
- Position: Left-back

Team information
- Current team: Stoke City
- Number: 17

Youth career
- 2009–2014: Val d'Europe
- 2015–2017: US Torcy
- 2017–2018: Dijon
- 2018–2019: Brest
- 2019–2020: Lille

Senior career*
Years	Team	Apps	(Gls)
2017–2018	Dijon B	11	(0)
2018–2019	Brest B	24	(0)
2019–2020	Lille B	20	(0)
2020	Lille	0	(0)
2020–2022	Mouscron	33	(1)
2022–2024	Sint-Truiden	59	(2)
2024–	Stoke City	71	(2)
- * Club domestic league appearances and goals as of 20:36, 21 November 2026 (UTC)

Eric-Junior Doriane Magate Kom Baga Bocat (born 16 July 1999) is a French professional footballer who plays as a left-back for EFL Championship club Stoke City.

== Career ==
=== Early career ===
Bocat was born in Paris and began playing football with youth teams Val d'Europe and US Torcy in Seine-et-Marne before joining the Dijon academy. He made eleven appearances for Dijon's B team in 2017–18 and 24 appearances for Brest's B team in 2018–19 before he joined Lille in August 2019. Bocat played for Lille's B team 20 times in the Championnat National 2 during the 2019–20 campaign and made his senior debut in a Coupe de France round of 16 tie against SAS Épinal which ended in a shock 2–1 defeat.

=== Mouscron ===
Bocat left Lille on 1 August 2020 and signed for Belgian top flight club Mouscron. He only made nine appearances in 2020–21 as Mouscron suffered relegation to the First Division B amid severe financial problems. He was a regular in 2021–22, playing 27 times as Mouscron's situation worsened and they were declared bankrupt at the end of the season.

=== Sint-Truiden ===
After two seasons at Mouscron, Bocat signed for Belgian Pro League side Sint-Truiden in July 2022. In his first season at Stayen, Bocat made 25 appearances as Sint-Truiden finished in a mid-table position of 12th. In 2023–24, Bocat only missed three games as the team finished ninth and competed in the European play-offs.

=== Stoke City ===
On 26 June 2024, Bocat joined English Championship side Stoke City for an undisclosed fee, reported to be around €1.5 million, plus €500,000 in add-ons, signing a four-year deal. Following the announcement of the transfer it was revealed that they had looked into signing the defender the previous transfer window, instead using the budget to prioritise the signing of a forward player, Million Manhoef. Bocat had a stop-start first season in English football, making 34 appearances in 2024–25, as Stoke avoided relegation on the final day. In the 2025–26 season, Bocat had competition for the left-back spot from the experienced Aaron Cresswell and was linked with a return to Belgium.

== Personal life ==
Born in France, Bocat is of Central African and Senegalese descent.

== Career statistics ==
As of match played 21 Novemer 2026

Appearances and goals by club, season and competition
Club	Season	League			National cup (Note: Includes Belgian Cup, Coupe de France and FA Cup)		League cup (Note: Includes Coupe de la Ligue and EFL Cup)		Other		Total	
Club	Season	Division	Apps	Goals	Apps	Goals	Apps	Goals	Apps	Goals	Apps	Goals
Dijon B	2017–18	Championnat National 3	11	0	—		—		—		11	0
Brest B	2018–19	Championnat National 3	24	0	—		—		—		24	0
Lille B	2019–20	Championnat National 2	20	0	—		—		—		20	0
Lille	2019–20	Ligue 1	0	0	1	0	0	0	0	0	1	0
Mouscron	2020–21	Belgian First Division A	8	0	1	0	—		—		9	0
Mouscron	2021–22	Belgian First Division B	25	1	2	0	—		—		27	1
Mouscron	Total		33	1	3	0	—		—		36	1
Sint-Truiden	2022–23	Belgian Pro League	22	0	3	0	—		—		25	0
Sint-Truiden	2023–24	Belgian Pro League	37	2	1	0	—		—		38	2
Sint-Truiden	Total		59	2	4	0	—		—		63	2
Stoke City	2024–25	Championship	30	0	0	0	4	0	—		34	0
Stoke City	2025–26	Championship	29	0	1	0	2	0	—		32	0
Stoke City	2026–27	Championship	12	2	0	0	1	0	—		13	2
Stoke City	Total		71	2	1	0	7	0	—		79	2
Career total			218	5	9	0	7	0	0	0	234	5
