= Chinonso Chibueze =

English association football player (born 2006)

Personal information
- Full name: Chinonso McAnthony Abi Chibueze
- Date of birth: 28 January 2006 (age 20)
- Place of birth: Lewisham, England
- Position: Winger

Team information
- Current team: South Shields (on loan from Stoke City)

Youth career
- –2016: Fulham
- 2016–2024: Chelsea
- 2024–2025: Stoke City

Senior career*
Years	Team	Apps	(Gls)
2025–	Stoke City	0	(0)
2026–	→ South Shields (loan)	0	(0)
- * Club domestic league appearances and goals as of 21:48, 12 August 2025 (UTC)

Chinonso McAnthony Abi Chibueze (born 28 January 2006) is an English professional footballer who plays as a winger for National League North side South Shields on loan from EFL Championship club Stoke City.

== Club career ==
Chibueze was born in London and joined the Chelsea academy from Fulham at under-10 level. He progressed through the youth teams at Chelsea until he joined Stoke City in September 2024, linking up with their under-21 squad. He made his professional debut on 26 August 2025 in a EFL Cup match against Bradford City, playing the full 90 minutes in a 3–0 defeat.

In July 2026, Chibueze joined National League North side South Shields on loan until 25 January 2027.

== Personal life ==
Chibueze is of Nigerian descent through his parents. His brother Kelechi is also a footballer who has played in the youth teams at Chelsea, Leicester City and Sunderland. Kelechi quit playing football at the age of 22 after he became disillusioned with the sport after poor treatment from the coaches at Leicester.

== Career statistics ==
As of match played 26 August 2025

Appearances and goals by club, season and competition
Club	Season	League			FA Cup		League Cup		Other		Total	
Club	Season	Division	Apps	Goals	Apps	Goals	Apps	Goals	Apps	Goals	Apps	Goals
Stoke City	2025–26	Championship	0	0	0	0	1	0	—		1	0
Career total			0	0	0	0	1	0	0	0	1	0
