= Divin Mubama =

English footballer (born 2004)

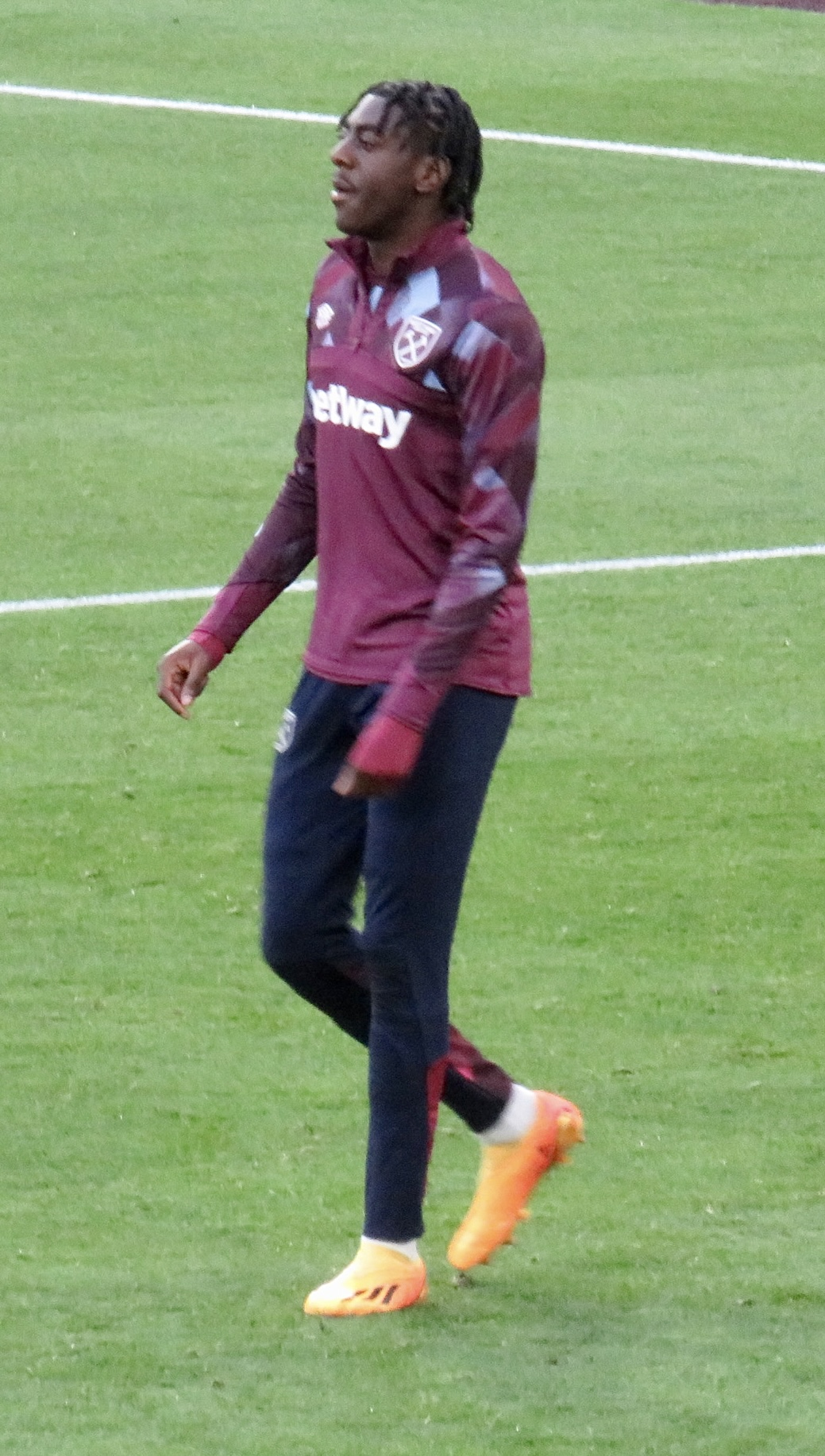
- Mubama with West Ham United in 2023

Personal information
- Full name: Divin Saku Mubama
- Date of birth: 25 October 2004 (age 22)
- Place of birth: Newham, England
- Height: 6 ft 0 in (1.83 m)
- Position: Forward

Team information
- Current team: Southampton (on loan from Manchester City)
- Number: 28

Youth career
- 2013–2022: West Ham United

Senior career*
Years	Team	Apps	(Gls)
2022–2024	West Ham United	8	(0)
2024–	Manchester City	1	(0)
2025–2026	→ Stoke City (loan)	26	(5)
2026–	→ Southampton (loan)	14	(2)

International career^{‡}
2019	England U15	3	(1)
2019–2020	England U16	8	(2)
2021–2022	England U18	7	(3)
2022–2023	England U19	5	(0)
2023–2025	England U20	6	(1)
2025–	England U21	12	(6)
- * Club domestic league appearances and goals as of 15:44, 21 November 2026 (UTC) ‡ National team caps and goals as of 20:44, 16 November 2026 (UTC)

Divin Saku Mubama (born 25 October 2004) is an English professional footballer who plays as a forward for EFL Championship club Southampton, on loan from Premier League club Manchester City.

== Club career ==
=== West Ham United ===
Mubama was born in Newham, London and attended St Bonaventure's. Mubama joined the West Ham United Academy at the age of eight. On 28 October 2021, Mubama signed his first professional contract with the club. On 3 November 2022, Mubama made his debut for West Ham in a UEFA Conference League tie against Romanian club FCSB. West Ham won the game 3–0 with Mubama's header diverted into his own goal by FCSB's Joyskim Dawa for West Ham's second goal.

On 16 March 2023, he scored his first senior competitive goal in the UEFA Conference League in a 4–0 win against AEK Larnaca, after coming on as a substitute. Mubama was a member of the team which won the 2023 FA Youth Cup, defeating Arsenal 5–1 at the Emirates Stadium in April 2023. Having scored a hat-trick in the previous round against Southampton, Mubama finished top-scorer in the competition.

On 30 June 2024, West Ham announced that Mubama would leave the club at the end of his contract finishing that day.

=== Manchester City ===
On 29 August 2024, Mubama confirmed he had signed for Manchester City. West Ham received a £2 million compensation fee as part of Mubama's move. He made his Man City debut on 11 January 2025, starting and then scoring in a 8–0 FA Cup third round home victory over EFL League Two side Salford City.

==== Stoke City (loan) ====
On 5 July 2025, Mubama joined EFL Championship club Stoke City on loan for the 2025–26 season. On 9 August, he marked his debut for the club with a goal, scoring the second in a 3–1 home win against Derby County in the opening game of the season. He scored his first hat-trick in senior football on 1 November 2025 in a 5–1 victory against Bristol City. His season was disrupted after a serious leg injury he suffered against Queens Park Rangers on 17 January 2026.

==== Southampton (loan) ====
On 11 August 2026, Mubama joined Southampton on a season-long loan. He made his debut for the club on 16 August in a 2–1 defeat against Watford after he replaced Cyle Larin in the 70th minute.

== International career ==
Born in England, Mubama is of DR Congolese descent. He has represented England at under-15, under-16, under-18, under-19, under-20 and under-21 level.

On 12 October 2023, Mubama made his England U20 debut during a 2–0 away defeat to Romania. He scored his only goal at this age level in a draw with Switzerland.

On 29 August 2025, Mubama was called up to the England under-21s. He made his debut during their opening 2027 UEFA European Under-21 Championship qualification win away to Kazakhstan on 8 September 2025. In their next qualifier he scored his first goal during a victory against Moldova.

== Personal life ==
Mubama attended St Bonaventure's in Forest Gate, the same school that Jermain Defoe, Chris Hughton and Chuba Akpom attended.

== Career statistics ==
As of match played 21 November 2026

Appearances and goals by club, season and competition
Club	Season	League			FA Cup		EFL Cup		Europe		Other		Total	
Club	Season	Division	Apps	Goals	Apps	Goals	Apps	Goals	Apps	Goals	Apps	Goals	Apps	Goals
West Ham United U21s	2022–23	—			—		—		—		2 (Note: Appearance(s) in EFL Trophy)	0	2	0
West Ham United U21s	2023–24	—			—		—		—		2	2	2	2
West Ham United U21s	Total		—		—		—		—		4	2	4	2
West Ham United	2022–23	Premier League	3	0	1	0	0	0	2 (Note: Appearances in UEFA Europa Conference League)	1	—		6	1
West Ham United	2023–24	Premier League	5	0	2	0	1	0	4 (Note: Appearances in UEFA Europa League)	0	—		12	0
West Ham United	Total		8	0	3	0	1	0	6	1	—		18	1
Manchester City U21s	2024–25	—			—		—		—		1	0	1	0
Manchester City	2024–25	Premier League	1	0	1	1	0	0	0	0	0	0	2	1
Stoke City (loan)	2025–26	Championship	26	5	1	0	1	0	—		—		28	5
Southampton (loan)	2026–27	Championship	14	2	0	0	1	0	—		—		15	2
Career total			49	7	5	1	3	0	6	1	5	2	68	11

== Honours ==
West Ham United U18

- FA Youth Cup: 2022–23
- U18 Premier League South: 2023

West Ham United

- UEFA Conference League: 2022–23

Individual

- West Ham United Young Player of the Year: 2022–23
