= Lamine Cissé =

French footballer (born 2003)

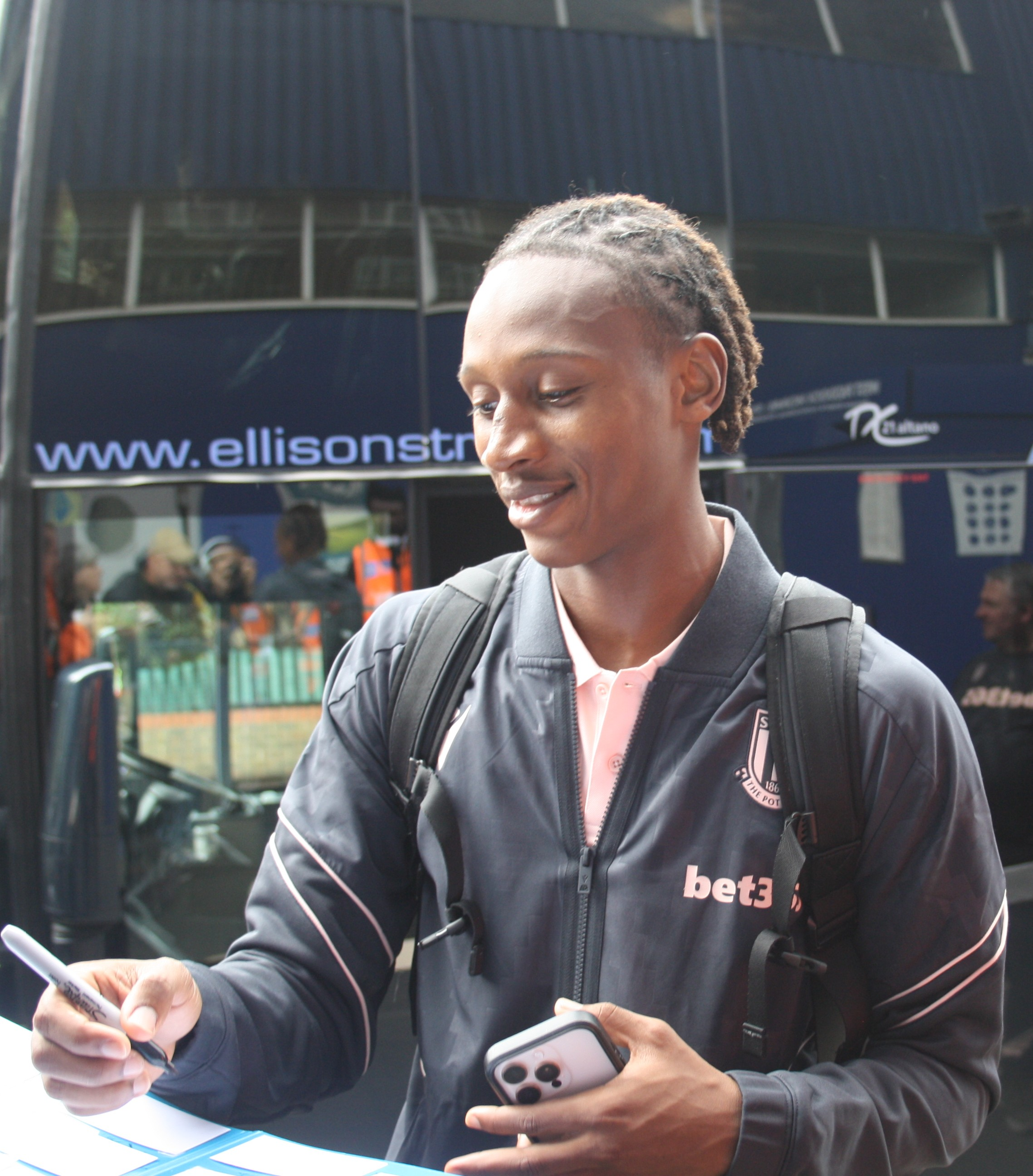
- Cissé in 2025.

Personal information
- Full name: Mohammed Lamine Cissé
- Date of birth: 15 February 2003 (age 23)
- Place of birth: Créteil, France
- Height: 1.78 m (5 ft 10 in)
- Position: Winger

Team information
- Current team: Stoke City
- Number: 11

Youth career
- 2011–2016: Ivry
- 2016–2017: Montrouge
- 2017–2018: Boulogne-Billancourt
- 2018–2021: Nancy

Senior career*
Years	Team	Apps	(Gls)
2021–2024	Nancy	72	(9)
2024	Nancy B	2	(3)
2024–2025	Bastia	31	(9)
2025–	Stoke City	42	(4)

International career
2018–2019	France U16	5	(0)
2021–2022	France U19	15	(3)
2022–2023	France U20	5	(1)
- * Club domestic league appearances and goals as of 19:31, 24 October 2026 (UTC)

Mohammed Lamine Cissé (born 15 February 2003) is a French professional footballer who plays as a winger for EFL Championship club Stoke City.

== Club career ==
=== Nancy ===
Cissé was born in Créteil, Île-de-France and played youth team football with Ivry, Montrouge and Boulogne-Billancourt before joining Nancy's academy in 2018. On 20 April 2021, Cissé signed his first professional contract with Nancy. He made his senior debut in a 3–1 Ligue 2 loss to Valenciennes on 1 May 2021. He broke into the first team at Nancy in 2021–22, making 23 appearances as the team suffered relegation to the Championnat National. After two seasons in the third tier Cissé left Nancy in June 2024 at the end of his contract.

=== Bastia ===
Cissé joined Ligue 2 side Bastia on 20 June 2024, signing a three-year contract. Cissé had a breakthrough season in Corsica, scoring 11 goals in 33 games in 2024–25 helping Bastia finish in 8th position.

=== Stoke City ===
Cissé signed for EFL Championship side Stoke City on 14 August 2025 for an undisclosed fee on a four-year contract. Cissé scored his first goal in English football in the FA Cup against Coventry City, a half-volley from 25 yards in the 88th minute. Cissé mainly played a make shift centre forward in the second half of the season due to injuries to Stoke's other forwards. He played 34 times in 2025–26, scoring four goals as Stoke finished in 17th.

== International career ==
Born in France, Cissé is of Guinean descent. He is a youth international for France.

== Career statistics ==
As of match played 24 October 2026

Appearances and goals by club, season and competition
Club	Season	League			National cup (Note: Includes Coupe de France, FA Cup)		League cup (Note: Includes EFL Cup)		Other		Total	
Club	Season	Division	Apps	Goals	Apps	Goals	Apps	Goals	Apps	Goals	Apps	Goals
Nancy	2020–21	Ligue 2	1	0	0	0	—		—		1	0
Nancy	2021–22	Ligue 2	21	2	2	0	—		—		23	2
Nancy	2022–23	Championnat National	29	4	0	0	—		—		29	4
Nancy	2023–24	Championnat National	21	3	0	0	—		—		21	3
Nancy	Total		72	9	2	0	—		—		74	9
Nancy B	2023–24	Championnat National 3	2	3	—		—		—		2	3
Bastia	2024–25	Ligue 2	31	9	2	2	—		—		33	11
Stoke City	2025–26	Championship	34	3	2	1	0	0	—		36	4
Stoke City	2026–27	Championship	8	1	0	0	1	0	—		9	1
Stoke City	Total		42	4	2	1	1	0	—		45	5
Career total			147	25	6	3	1	0	0	0	154	28
