= William Smith =

William, Willie, Will, Bill, or Billy Smith may refer to:

== Academia ==
- William Smith (Master of Clare College, Cambridge) (1556–1615), English academic
- William Smith (antiquary) (c. 1653–1735), English antiquary and historian of University College, Oxford
- William Smith (judge, born 1728) (1728–1793), historian and judge
- William Smith (scholar) (1711–1787), English classical scholar and Anglican Dean of Chester
- William Smith (Episcopal priest) (1727–1803), Scottish-born first provost of University of Pennsylvania
- William Pitt Smith (1760–1796), American physician, educator and theological writer
- William Andrew Smith (1802–1870), American college president and clergyman
- William Smith (lexicographer) (1813–1893), English editor and publisher of dictionaries
- William Robertson Smith (1846–1894), Scottish philologist, physicist, archaeologist and Biblical critic
- William Benjamin Smith (1850–1934), American professor of mathematics at Tulane University
- William Ramsay Smith (1859–1937), Australian anthropologist
- William George Smith (1866–1918), Scottish psychologist
- William Hall Smith (1866–after 1920), President of Mississippi Agricultural and Mechanical College, 1916–1920
- William Cunningham Smith (1871–1943), American academic of English literature, university administrator and writer
- William Roy Smith (1876–1938), American academic historian
- William Charles Smith (1881–1972), English musicologist
- William Newton-Smith (1943–2023), Anglo-Canadian philosopher of science

== Arts and entertainment ==
=== Fictional characters ===
- Bill Smith, in the Canadian TV comedy program The Red Green Show, played by Rick Green
- Billy Smith, in the US late-night live sketch comedy variety show Saturday Night Live, played by Fred Armisen
- Billy Smith, in the UK TV soap opera Coronation Street
- Will Smith (The Fresh Prince of Bel-Air), TV series character
- Will Smith (Home and Away), in the Australian TV soap opera Home and Away, played by Zac Drayson
- Will Smith, child character in Wee Sing The Best Christmas Ever!

=== Architecture ===
- William Smith (architect) (1817–1891), Scottish architect
- William Crawford Smith (1837–1899), American architect
- W. Wheeler Smith (c. 1838–1908), American architect and real estate developer

=== Film, television, and theatre ===
- William "Gentleman" Smith (1730–1819), English stage star
- William Henry Smith (1806–1872), American author of 1844 temperance play The Drunkard
- William Smith (American actor) (1933–2021), American character performer
- William Smith (17th-century actor) (died 1696), British actor
- William Smith (teacher) (1939–2024), South African television science and mathematics presenter
- Will Smith (comedian) (born 1971), English actor and writer
- Will Smith (born 1968), American actor, rapper, and film producer
- Billy J. Smith (1946–2019), Australian television and radio presenter

=== Graphic arts ===
- William Thompson Russell Smith (1812–1896), Scottish-American painter
- William Collingwood Smith (1815–1887), English painter
- William Brooke Smith (before 1880–1908), American artist
- William Twigg-Smith (1883–1950), New Zealand artist
- William E. Smith (artist) (1913–1997), African American illustrator
- W. Eugene Smith (1918–1978), American photojournalist
- William Craig Smith (1918–1986), American art director
- William Arthur Smith (1918–1989), American artist

=== Literature ===
- William Smith (poet) (before 1570–after 1606), English sonneteer
- William Gardner Smith (1927–1974), African-American novelist
- William Hart-Smith (1911–1990), New Zealand/Australian poet
- William Henry Smith (1806–1872), American author of 1844 temperance play The Drunkard
- William Jardine Smith (1834–1884), Australian writer and editor
- William Jay Smith (1918–2015), American poet
- William Tyler Smith (1815–1873), English obstetrician, medical writer and journalist
- William Wragg Smith (1808–1875), American planter, lawyer, naturalist, translator and poet
- Will Smith (comedian) (born 1971), English actor and writer
- Will Smith, American tech journalist, 2010 founder of Tested.com

=== Music ===
- Barkin' Bill Smith (1928–2000), American Chicago blues singer
- Bill Smith (Canadian musician) (born 1938), Canadian record producer, musician, writer, editor
- Bill Smith (English musician) (born 1940), founding member of the Quarrymen
- Bill Smith (jazz musician) (1926–2020), folk jazz clarinetist, professor of music at the University of Washington
- Major Bill Smith (1922–1994), American record producer and executive
- William Smith (composer) (1603–1645), English composer from the city of Durham
- William "Smitty" Smith (1944–1997), keyboardist and session musician
- Willie "Big Eyes" Smith (1936–2011), blues drummer and singer
- Willie "Long Time" Smith, dates unknown, Chicago blues pianist and singer
- Willie Smith (alto saxophonist) (1910–1967), jazz alto saxophonist
- Willie "the Lion" Smith (1893–1973), jazz pianist
- William Oscar Smith, jazz double bassist and music educator
- Billo Smith (William David Smith, 1897–1973), Australian musician and bandleader
- Will Smith (born 1968), American actor, rapper, and film producer

=== Other people in arts and entertainment ===
- Bill Smith (jewelry designer) (born 1933), first African American recipient of Coty Award
- Willi Smith (1948–1987), American fashion designer

== Business ==
- William Smith (businessman) (1818–1912), nurseryman and donor to Hobart and William Smith Colleges
- William Smith (Nova Scotia politician) (died 1779), merchant, judge and politician in Nova Scotia
- William Alexander Smith (Boys' Brigade) (1854–1914), founder of the Boys' Brigade
- William Haslam Smith (1891–1958), businessman and political figure in Nova Scotia, Canada
- William Henry Smith (1792–1865), entrepreneur whose business was about both newsagents and book shops, father of William Henry Smith (1825–1891)
- William Lyman Smith (1878–1964), telephone businessman and Wisconsin political figure
- William Reardon Smith (1856–1935), British shipowner
- Willie Reardon Smith (1887–1950), British shipowner
- William Wensley Smith (1887–1955), founder of W. W. Smith Insurance Ltd
- W. Wheeler Smith (c. 1838–1908), American architect and real estate developer

== Criminals and criminally accused ==
- William Kennedy Smith (born 1960), physician and Kennedy family scion who was acquitted of rape in 1991
- William Scott Smith (born 1959), American serial killer and kidnapper
- William Smith (murderer) (1957–2005), executed by the State of Ohio in 2005
- William Trickett Smith II (born 1981), American drug trafficker convicted of murdering his wife in Peru in 2007, son of lawyer William Trickett Smith

== Law ==
=== United States and American colonies ===
==== Federal courts ====
- William E. Smith (judge) (born 1959), judge on the US District Court for the District of Rhode Island
- William Francis Smith (1904–1968), judge of the US Court of Appeals for the Third Circuit

==== State supreme courts ====
- William W. Smith (Arkansas judge) (1838–1888), justice of the Arkansas Supreme Court
- William A. Smith (Iowa judge) (1870–1958), justice of the Iowa Supreme Court
- William A. Smith (Kansas judge) (1888–1968), associate justice of the Kansas Supreme Court
- William Redwood Smith (1851–1935), associate justice of the Kansas Supreme Court

==== Other people in law in the United States and American colonies ====
- William Smith (New York politician, born 1720) (1720–1799), New York politician and judge
- William Owen Smith (1848–1929), lawyer involved in overthrow of the Kingdom of Hawaii
- William Smith (judge, born 1728) (1728–1793), historian, chief justice of the Province of New York, and chief justice of the Province of Quebec and later Lower Canada
- William Smith (judge, born 1697) (1697–1769), father of John Smith, Doctor Thomas Smith, Joshua Hett Smith, and chief justice William Smith
- William "Tangier" Smith (1655–1705), chief justice of the Province of New York from 1692
- William Trickett Smith (1937–2021), American lawyer who was disbarred

=== In other countries ===
- William Smith (judge, born 1728) (1728–1793), historian, chief justice of the Province of New York, and chief justice of the Province of Quebec and later Lower Canada
- William Smith (Nova Scotia politician) (died 1779), merchant, judge and politician in Nova Scotia
- Sir William Cusack-Smith, 2nd Baronet (1766–1836), Irish baronet, politician, and judge
- Sir William James Smith (1853–1912), British judge who served as the chief justice of the Supreme Court of Cyprus, British Guiana and the Transvaal
- William Nimmo Smith, Lord Nimmo Smith (born 1942), former senator of the College of Justice and judge of the Supreme Courts of Scotland

== Military ==
=== United Kingdom ===
- William Smith (Royal Navy officer) (died 1756), served as commander-in-chief of the Jamaica Station and rose to rear admiral
- William Danvers Smith, 2nd Viscount Hambleden (1868–1928), known as Frederick Smith, officer in the British Army
- William Douglas Smith (1865–1939), British general
- Sir Sidney Smith (Royal Navy officer) (William Sidney Smith, 1764–1840), British admiral
- William Thomas Smith (1896–1994), World War I flying ace
- William Watson Smith (1892–?), World War I flying ace
- William Smith (c. 1872–1941), master of the SS Sauternes, English merchant seaman killed in World War II

=== United States and American colonies ===
==== US Army ====
- William Duncan Smith (1825–1862), US Army officer and Confederate general
- William Farrar Smith (1824–1903), Union Army general
- William F. Smith (US Army Air Corps), piloted the US Army Air Corps B-25 Billy Mitchell Bomber that crashed into the Empire State Building
- William H. Smith (Medal of Honor) (1847–1877), American Indian Wars soldier and Medal of Honor recipient
- William Ruthven Smith (1868–1941), US Army officer
- William Smith (Medal of Honor, 1869) (1838–?), American Indian Wars soldier and Medal of Honor recipient
- William Smith (paymaster general) (1831–1912), US Army officer
- William Sooy Smith (1830–1916), American Civil War general

==== Other services ====
- William Smith (patriot) (1746–1787), commanding officer of the Lincoln minutemen in the battles of Lexington and Concord
- William D. Smith (admiral) (1933–2020), US Navy admiral
- William Smith (Medal of Honor, 1864) (1826–?), American Civil War sailor and Medal of Honor recipient
- William Smith (ship captain) (1768–1846), American ship captain and Revolutionary War veteran
- William W. Smith (admiral) (1888–1966), US Navy admiral during World War II
- William Y. Smith (1925–2016), US Air Force general

=== Other countries ===
- William Duncan Smith (1825–1862), US Army officer and Confederate general
- William James Lanyon Smith, New Zealand naval officer
- William Osborne Smith (1833–1887), first acting commissioner of the North West Mounted Police, Canada
- William Smith (Virginia governor) (1797–1887), governor of Virginia (1846–1849, 1864–1865) and Confederate general

== Politics and government ==
=== Australia ===
- William Collard Smith (1830–1894), treasurer in colonial Victoria (Australia)
- William Laird Smith (1869–1942), Australian representative for Denison, 1910–1922 and Minister for the Navy, 1920–1921
- William Forgan Smith (1887–1953), premier of the Australian state of Queensland, 1932–1942
- William Kennedy Smith (Australian politician) (1888–1933)

=== Canada ===
- William Smith (Nova Scotia politician) (died 1779), merchant, judge and politician in Nova Scotia
- Amor De Cosmos (William Alexander Smith, 1825–1897), premier of British Columbia
- William Henry Smith (Canadian politician) (1826–1890), lawyer and political figure in Nova Scotia, Canada
- William Smith (Ontario politician) (1847–1931), member of Canadian House of Commons 1887–1921
- William C. Smith (politician) (1875–1968), politician from Alberta, Canada
- William Haslam Smith (1891–1958), businessman and political figure in Nova Scotia, Canada
- William Duncan Smith (politician) (1899–1977), Canadian politician in the Legislative Assembly of British Columbia
- Bill Smith (Alberta politician) (born 1934), former mayor of Edmonton
- William Smith (Newfoundland politician) (1910–1965), politician in Newfoundland
- J. William Smith (1868–1937), member of the Legislative Assembly of New Brunswick

=== United Kingdom ===
- William Goldsmith alias Smith (died 1517), MP for Gloucester
- William Smith (fl. 1553–54), MP for Newport (Cornwall)
- William Smith (died 1591), MP for Wells
- William Smith (MP for Ripon) (1550–1626)
- William Smith (MP for Aylesbury) (1568–1620), MP for Aylesbury, 1604
- William Smith (British civil servant) (1721–1803), of Chichester, UK, treasurer of the ordnance
- William Smith (abolitionist) (1756–1835), grandfather of Florence Nightingale, dissenter and British MP
- William Smith of Carbeth Guthrie (1787–1871), Lord Provost of Glasgow
- William Henry Smith (1825–1891), MP and cabinet minister (First Lord of the Admiralty, war secretary)
- William Masters Smith (1802–1861), member of parliament for West Kent
- William Smith (1849–1913), member of parliament for North Lonsdale, 1892–1895
- William Smith, 3rd Viscount Hambleden (1903–1948), British peer
- William Smith, 4th Viscount Hambleden (1930–2012), British peer
- William Smith (loyalist) (1954–2016), Northern Irish loyalist politician

=== United States ===
==== Federal office ====
- William Smith (judge, born 1697) (1697–1769), Attorney General of New York
- William Smith (Maryland politician) (1728–1814), member of the U.S. House of Representatives from Maryland (1789–1791)
- William Smith (South Carolina politician, born 1751) (1751–1837), member of the U.S. House of Representatives from South Carolina (1797–1798)
- William Smith (South Carolina politician, born 1762) (1762–1840), U.S. senator from South Carolina (1815–1830)
- William Smith (Virginia representative), member of the U.S. House of Representatives from Virginia (1821–1827)
- William Alden Smith (1859–1932), member of the U.S. House of Representatives (1895–1906) and U.S. senator (1905–1918) from Michigan
- William Alexander Smith (politician) (1828–1888), member of the U.S. House of Representatives from North Carolina (1873–1874)
- William Ephraim Smith (1829–1890), member of the Confederate (1863–1865) and U.S. (1875–1881) House of Representatives from Georgia
- William French Smith (1917–1990), U.S. attorney general (1981–1985)
- William Jay Smith (Tennessee politician) (1823–1913), member of the U.S. House of Representatives from Tennessee
- William Loughton Smith (1758–1812), member of the U.S. House of Representatives from South Carolina (1789–1798)
- William N. H. Smith (1812–1889), member of the U.S. House of Representatives from North Carolina (1859–1860)
- William Orlando Smith (1859–1932), member of the U.S. House of Representatives from Pennsylvania (1903–1906)
- William Robert Smith (1863–1924), member of the U.S. House of Representatives from Texas (1903–1916)
- William Russell Smith (1815–1896), member of the U.S. House of Representatives from Alabama (1851–1856)
- William Stephens Smith (1755–1816), member of the U.S. House of Representatives from New York (1813–1816) and son-in-law of President John Adams

==== Governors and lieutenant governors ====
- William Smith (Virginia governor) (1797–1887), governor of Virginia (1846–1849, 1864–1865) and Confederate general
- William E. Smith (politician) (1824–1883), governor of Wisconsin (1878–1882)
- William Grover Smith (1857–1921), lieutenant governor of Colorado, 1889–1891
- William Hugh Smith (1826–1899), governor of Alabama (1868–1870)

==== Other state and local offices ====
- William Smith (Delaware politician), state politician from Delaware
- William Smith (Illinois politician), member of the Illinois House of Representatives
- William Smith (New York politician, born 1720) (1720–1799), New York politician and judge
- William Smith (Oregon politician), Oregon state senator (1890s)
- William Burns Smith (1844–1917), mayor of Philadelphia
- William C. Smith Jr. (born 1982), Maryland state legislator
- William Ernest Smith (1890–1973), mayor of Murray, Utah, 1946–1947
- William F. Smith (New York politician) (1901–1950), member of the New York State Assembly (1926–1933)
- William H. Smith (Connecticut politician) (1842–1915), warden of the Borough of Norwalk, Connecticut
- William Henry Smith (American politician) (1833–1896), newspaper editor and politician, Ohio secretary of state 1865–1868
- William J. Smith (Maryland politician) (1850–1906), American politician
- William L. Smith (barber) (1878–?), Socialist barber from Milwaukee who served three terms in the Wisconsin State Assembly
- William Lyman Smith (1878–1964), telephone businessman who served one term in the Wisconsin State Assembly and two in the Wisconsin State Senate
- William M. Smith, speaker of the Illinois House of Representatives
- William Pruden Smith (1876–1923), American lawyer and mayor of Miami
- William R. Smith (Utah politician) (1826–1894), member of the Utah Territory House of Representatives
- William Roy Smith (politician) (1920–1993), American politician from Virginia
- William Rudolph Smith (1787–1868), politician in the states of Pennsylvania and Wisconsin
- William T. Smith (1916–2010), member of the New York State Senate

=== Other countries ===
- William Smith (registrar) (1816–1895), Ghanaian civil servant
- Sir William Cusack-Smith, 2nd Baronet (1766–1836), Irish baronet, politician, and judge
- William Ephraim Smith (1829–1890), member of the Confederate (1863–1865) and U.S. (1875–1881) House of Representatives from Georgia
- William Mein Smith (1798–1869), key actor in the early settlement of New Zealand's capital city, Wellington
- William Cowper Smith (1843–1911), Liberal Party member of parliament in New Zealand

== Religion ==
- William Smith (minister) (died 1647), buried in the Prophet's Grave near Largs, North Ayrshire, Scotland
- William Smith (Archdeacon of Armagh) (died 1673), English priest in Ireland
- William Smith (Provost of St Andrew's Cathedral, Aberdeen), 18th-century Scottish priest
- William Smith (Latter Day Saints) (1811–1893), younger brother of Joseph Smith, Jr. and himself a Mormon leader
- William Smith (bishop) (1819–1892), Catholic archbishop of St. Andrews and Edinburgh
- William Smith (monsignor) (1939–2009), Catholic theologian
- William Andrew Smith (1802–1870), American college president and clergyman
- William Angie Smith (1894–1974), bishop of the Methodist Church and the United Methodist Church
- William Carr Smith (1857–1930), Church of England clergyman
- William Pitt Smith (1760–1796), American physician, educator and theological writer
- William R. Smith (Utah politician) (1826–1894), Mormon leader in Davis County, Utah Territory
- William Robertson Smith (1846–1894), Scottish philologist, physicist, archaeologist and Biblical critic
- William Saumarez Smith (1836–1909), Anglican bishop/archbishop of Sydney

== Science, engineering, and medicine ==
=== Botany and ecology ===
- William Smith (conservationist) (1852–1942), New Zealand gardener, naturalist and conservationist
- William Gardner Smith (botanist) (1866–1928), Scottish botanist and ecologist
- William Wragg Smith (1808–1875), American planter, lawyer, naturalist, translator and poet
- William Wright Smith (1875–1956), Scottish botanist and horticulturalist

=== Medicine and psychology ===
- William Smith (physician), Scottish American physician
- William George Smith (1866–1918), Scottish psychologist
- William Pitt Smith (1760–1796), American physician, educator and theological writer
- William R. Smith (physician) (born 1973), American emergency physician and wilderness medicine consultant
- William Robert Smith (physician) (1850–1932), British public health expert
- William Tyler Smith (1815–1873), English obstetrician, medical writer and journalist
- Willie W. Smith (1907–1989), American physiologist

=== Other fields in science and engineering ===
- Bill Smith (Motorola engineer) (1929–1993), one of the creators of Six Sigma
- William Smith (geologist) (1769–1839), English geologist

== Sports ==
=== American football ===
- Bill Smith (American football, born 1912) (1912–1999), end
- Earthquake Smith (William Gerald Smith, 1926–2009), tackle and end
- Billy Ray Smith Jr. (1961–2026)
- Billy Ray Smith Sr. (1935–2001)
- Billy Smith (running back) (born c. 1970)
- Wee Willie Smith (American football) (1910–1996)
- William F. Smith (American football) (1888–?), college player and coach
- Willie Smith (American football coach) (1931–2016), head college football coach for the North Carolina Central University Eagles
- Willie Smith (offensive tackle, born 1937)
- Willie Smith (offensive tackle, born 1986)
- Willie Smith (tight end) (born 1964)
- Will Smith (defensive end) (1981–2016)
- Will Smith (linebacker, born 1992)

=== Association football ===
- Bill Smith (footballer, born 1887) (1887–1929), English footballer with Brentford, Southampton and Halifax Town
- Bill Smith (footballer, born 1897) (1897–?), English footballer with Durham City and York City
- Bill Smith (footballer, born 1906) (1906–1979), English footballer with Norwich City and Exeter City
- Bill Smith (footballer, born 1926) (1926–2014), English footballer with Birmingham City and Blackburn Rovers
- Bill Smith (footballer, born 1938), Scottish footballer with Raith Rovers and Darlington
- Bill Smith (soccer), Canadian soccer player, active 1943–1963
- Billy Smith (footballer, born 1872) (1872–?), English footballer with Wolverhampton Wanderers
- Billy Smith (footballer, born 1873) (1873–1914), Scottish footballer for Newcastle United
- Billy Smith (footballer, born 1882) (1882–?), English footballer for West Bromwich Albion and Birmingham
- Billy Smith (footballer, born 1895) (1895–1951), English footballer with Huddersfield Town
- Billy Smith (footballer, born 1900) (1900–?), English footballer with Hartlepool United, Huddersfield Town and Rochdale
- Billy Smith (footballer, born 1906) (1906–1963), English footballer with South Shields, Portsmouth and Stockport County
- Billy Smith (Scottish footballer) (1931–2009), Scottish footballer with Aberdeen
- Buxton Smith (William Smith), English footballer with Buxton and Manchester City
- Stockport Smith (William Smith), English footballer with Stockport and Manchester United
- William A. Smith (footballer), English footballer with Blackburn Rovers
- William Smith (footballer, born 1865) (1865–?), English goalkeeper with Burnley
- William Smith (footballer, born 1868) (1868–1907), English footballer with Lincoln City, Loughborough, Notts County and Nottingham Forest
- William Smith (footballer, born 1886) (1886–1956), footballer with Bradford City and Stoke
- William Smith (footballer, born 1903) (1903–?), English footballer
- William Smith (Scottish footballer), footballer with Hibernian
- Willie Smith (footballer, born 1909), Scottish footballer see List of AFC Bournemouth players
- Willie Smith (footballer, born 1943), Scottish footballer with Brentford
- Willie Smith (footballer, born 1948), English footballer with Wimbledon
- Will Smith (footballer, born 1998), English footballer for Harrogate Town
- Will Smith (footballer, born 2005), English footballer for Stoke City
- W. J. Smith (1893–1957), known as Billy, football manager, Aston Villa

=== Baseball ===
- Big Bill Smith (1869–?), Negro leagues baseball catcher and manager
- Bill Smith (baseball executive) (born 1958), Minnesota Twins general manager
- Bill Smith (baseball manager), National Association player-manager for the Baltimore Marylands
- Bill Smith (pitcher) (1934–1997), American left-handed pitcher in Major League Baseball, 1958–59; 1962
- Bill Smith (outfielder) (1865–1886), American baseball outfielder for the 1884 Cleveland Blues
- Billy Smith (baseball coach) (1930–2024), American minor league first baseman and manager and Major League coach and scout
- Billy Smith (1980s pitcher) (1954–2025), American pitcher in Major League Baseball, 1981
- Billy Smith (1880s pitcher) (1861–1928), American right-handed pitcher in Major League Baseball, 1886
- Billy Smith (second baseman) (born 1953), American infielder in Major League Baseball, 1975–79; 1981
- Willie Smith (outfielder) (1939–2006), American outfielder in Major League Baseball, 1963–1971
- Willie Smith (third baseman), American third baseman in Negro league baseball, 1938
- Willie Smith (1940s pitcher), American pitcher in Negro league baseball, 1948
- Willie Smith (1990s pitcher) (born 1967), American pitcher in Major League Baseball, 1994
- Will Smith (pitcher) (born 1989), American pitcher in Major League Baseball
- Will Smith (catcher) (born 1995), American baseball catcher
- Dark Night Smith (William C. Smith), American pitcher in Negro league baseball, 1920–1924

=== Basketball ===
- Bill Smith (basketball, born 1939) (1939–2023), American basketball player
- Wee Willie Smith (1911–1992), American basketball player
- William Smith (basketball, born 1949), American basketball player
- Willie Smith (basketball) (born 1953), American professional basketball player

=== Cricket ===
- Bill Smith (cricketer) (1937–2018), English cricketer
- William Brook-Smith (1885–1952), New Zealand cricketer
- William Smith (cricketer, born 1839) (1839–1897), first class cricketer for Yorkshire
- William Smith (cricketer, born 1875) (1875–1942), first-class cricketer for London County
- William Smith (cricketer, born 1882) (1882–?), English cricketer
- William Smith (cricketer, born 1900) (1900–1990), English cricketer
- William Smith (cricketer, born 1902) (1902–1937), Scottish cricketer
- William Smith (Kent cricketer) (1819–1883), English cricketer
- William Smith (Somerset cricketer) (1871–1946), English cricketer
- Willie Smith (cricketer) (1885–1964), English cricketer
- Will Smith (cricketer) (born 1982), English cricketer

=== Rugby football ===
- Bill Smith, Australian rugby league footballer in the Bulimba Cup
- Bill Smith, rugby league right wing of the 1950s for Whitehaven
- Billy Smith (rugby league, born 1942) (1942–2026), Australian rugby league footballer
- Billy Smith (rugby league, born 1999), Professional rugby league footballer
- W. Smith (rugby league) (1886–1918), Australian rugby league footballer
- Will Smith (rugby league) (born 1992), Australian rugby league footballer
- William Smith (rugby union) (1881–1945), New Zealand rugby union player
- Bill Smith (rugby league) (1904–1987), Australian rugby league footballer

=== Track and field ===
- Bill Smith (fell runner) (1936–2011), fell runner and author on the sport
- Willie Smith (hurdler) (born 1977), Namibian track and field hurdler
- Willie Smith (sprinter) (1956–2020), American 400 metres runner

=== Other individual sports ===
- Bill Smith (motorcyclist) (born 1935), former Grand Prix motorcycle road racer
- Bill Smith (poker player) (1934–1996), professional poker player
- Bill Smith (swimmer) (1924–2013), two-time gold medalist in the 1948 Olympic games
- Mysterious Billy Smith (1871–1937), Canadian boxer
- William Alexander Smith (boxer) (1904–1955), South African boxer of the 1920s
- William Smith (cyclist, born 1893) (1893–1958), South African Olympic cyclist
- William Smith (cyclist, born 2004), British cyclist
- William Smith (sport shooter) (1877–1953), Canadian Olympic sport shooter
- William Smith (wrestler) (1928–2018), 1952 Olympic gold medalist
- Willie Smith (billiards player) (1886–1982), English professional player of snooker and English billiards
- Willie Smith (golfer) (1876–1916), Scottish golfer

=== Other team-only sports ===
- Bill Smith (Australian rules footballer) (1936–2010), Australian rules footballer for Fitzroy
- Billy Smith (Australian footballer) (1894–1953), played with North Melbourne in the Victorian Football League
- Billy Dee Smith (born 1982), Canadian former professional lacrosse player
- Billy Smith (ice hockey) (born 1950), Canadian ice hockey goaltender
- Will Smith (ice hockey) (born 2005), American ice hockey forward
- William Smith (field hockey) (1886–1937), British field hockey player who competed in the 1920 Summer Olympics
- Willie Smith (hurler) (born 1944), Irish hurler

== Other persons ==
- William Smith (conservationist) (1852–1942), New Zealand gardener, naturalist and conservationist
- William Smith (mariner) (1790–1847), British mariner and discoverer of the South Shetland Islands
- William Smith (shearer) (1896–1947), perhaps the most skilled sheep-shearer in the first half of the 20th century
- William Smith (surveyor), fl. 1726, English
- William Alexander Smith (Boys' Brigade) (1854–1914), founder of the Boys' Brigade
- William Wragg Smith (1808–1875), American planter, lawyer, naturalist, translator and poet
- Bill Smith (chef), American chef
- Bill Smith (scuba diver), participated in the effort to recover Bluebird K7

== See also ==
- Hobart and William Smith Colleges, a private liberal arts college in Geneva, New York
- William Smith House (disambiguation), several buildings
- Billy Ray Smith (disambiguation)
- Will Smith (disambiguation)
- Willard Smith (disambiguation)
- William Smyth (disambiguation)
- William Smythe (disambiguation)
- William Schmidt (disambiguation)
- Wilhelm Schmidt (disambiguation)
- List of people with surname Smith
- Willie Mae Ford Smith (1904–1994), American musician and Christian evangelist
