= William W. Smith =

William W. Smith may refer to:

- William W. Smith (admiral) (1888–1966), United States Navy admiral during World War II
- William W. Smith (Arkansas judge) (1838–1888), justice of the Arkansas Supreme Court
- William Watson Smith (1892–?), World War I flying ace
- William Wensley Smith (1887–1955), founder of W. W. Smith Insurance Ltd
- William Wright Smith (1875–1956), Scottish botanist and horticulturalist
- W. Wheeler Smith (William Wheeler Smith) (c. 1838–c. 1908), American architect and real estate developer

== See also ==
- Willie W. Smith, American physiologist
- William Smith (disambiguation)
