= Will Smith (disambiguation) =

Will Smith (born 1968) is an American rapper, actor, and film producer.

Will Smith may also refer to:

== People ==
- Will Smith (catcher) (born 1995), American baseball catcher
- Will Smith (comedian) (born 1971), British comedian, actor and writer
- Will Smith (cricketer) (born 1982), English cricketer
- Will Smith (defensive end) (1981–2016), American football defensive end
- Will Smith (footballer, born 1998), English footballer for Harrogate Town
- Will Smith (ice hockey) (born 2005), American ice hockey forward
- Will Smith (journalist), American tech journalist
- Will Smith (linebacker, born 1992), American football linebacker
- Will Smith (pitcher) (born 1989), American pitcher in Major League Baseball
- Will Smith (rugby league) (born 1992), Australian rugby league player
- Will Smith (footballer, born 2005), English footballer for Stoke City
- Will Carrick-Smith (born 1992), rugby player

== Fictional characters ==
- Will Smith (The Fresh Prince of Bel-Air), from American sitcom The Fresh Prince of Bel-Air, based on the real-life rapper
- Will Smith (Home and Away), from Australian soap opera Home and Away
- Will Smith, child character in Wee Sing The Best Christmas Ever!

== See also ==
- Willard Smith (disambiguation)
- William Smith (disambiguation)
- Willi Smith (1948–1987), American fashion designer
