= William D. Smith =

William D. Smith may refer to:

- William Danvers Smith, 2nd Viscount Hambleden (1868–1928), known as Frederick Smith, officer in the British Army
- William Douglas Smith (1865–1939), British general
- William D. Smith (admiral) (1933–2020), United States Navy admiral
- William Duncan Smith (1825–1862), United States Army officer and Confederate general
- William Duncan Smith (politician) (1899–1977), Canadian politician in the Legislative Assembly of British Columbia
- William D. "Smitty" Smith (1944–1997), keyboardist and session musician

== See also ==
- William Smith (disambiguation)
