= William C. Smith =

William C. Smith may refer to:

- William Charles Smith (1881–1971), English musicologist
- William Craig Smith (1918–1986), American art director
- William Crawford Smith (1837–1899), American architect and Confederate veteran
- Sir William Cusack-Smith, 2nd Baronet (1766–1836), Irish baronet, politician, and judge
- William Cunningham Smith (1871–1943), American academic, university administrator, and writer
- William C. Smith (politician) (1875–1968), Alberta MLA
- William C. Smith Jr. (born 1982), American politician in the Maryland State Senate

== See also ==
- William Smith (disambiguation)
