= William F. Smith =

William F. Smith may refer to:

- William F. Smith (American football) (1888–?), American college football player and coach
- William F. Smith (New York politician) (1901–1950), American lawyer and politician
- William Farrar Smith (1824–1903), Union Army general
- William Francis Smith (1904–1968), U.S. District Court judge
- William French Smith (1917–1990), U.S. Attorney General
- William Forgan Smith (1887–1952), Premier of the Australian state of Queensland
- William F. Smith, Jr. (died 1945), lieutenant colonel in the U.S. Army Air Forces who died in the 1945 Empire State Building B-25 crash

== See also ==
- William Smith (disambiguation)
