= William Smyth (disambiguation) =

William Smyth (c. 1460–1514) was an English bishop.

William Smyth may also refer to:

== Politics ==
- Sir William Smyth, 1st Baronet (c.1616–1696), English politician
- William Smyth (Irish politician), UK MP for the Irish constituency of County Westmeath, 1801–1808
- William Smyth (congressman) (1824–1870), American politician
- William Smyth (Australian politician) (1846–1899), Australian politician for electoral district of Gympie
- William Ross Smyth (1857–1932), Canadian politician
- William James Smyth (1886–1950), labour member of the Senate of Northern Ireland

== Sports ==
- William Smyth (rugby union) (1886–1937), Irish international rugby union player
- Bill Smyth (umpire) (1916–2007), Australian cricket umpire
- Billy Smyth (1925–2005), Northern Irish footballer
- Bill Smyth (American football) (1922–1966), American football player

== Religion ==
- William Edmund Smyth (1858–1950), Anglican bishop in England and South Africa
- William Smyth (Irish bishop) (1642–1705), Anglican bishop in Ireland
- William Blood Smyth, archdeacon of Killaloe, 1927–1938
- William Smyth (priest, born 1683) (1683–1759), dean of Ardfert and archdeacon of Meath
- William Smyth (priest, born 1662) (1662–1710), Irish Anglican priest, archdeacon of Connor
- Sir William Smyth, 6th Baronet (c. 1719–1777), English landowner and clergyman

== Other ==
- William Smyth (architect) (died 1490), English Gothic architect
- William Smyth (academic administrator) (1582–1658), English academic administrator at the University of Oxford
- William Smyth (historian) (1765–1849), English historian
- William Henry Smyth (1788–1865), British astronomer and admiral
- William Smyth (professor) (1797–1868), American mathematician

== See also ==
- William Smythe (disambiguation)
- William Smith (disambiguation)
