= John Wright Bowles =

John Wright Bowles was an Anglican priest in Ireland.

Bowles was born in County Cork and educated at Trinity College, Dublin. He was ordained deacon in 1846 and priest in 1848. Bowles was the incumbent at Nenagh. He was Archdeacon of Killaloe from 1884 until his death on 24 August 1888.
