= St. Nicholas Collegiate Reformed Protestant Dutch Church =

Demolished church in Manhattan, New York (1872–1949)

Coordinates: 40°45′27″N 73°58′42″W

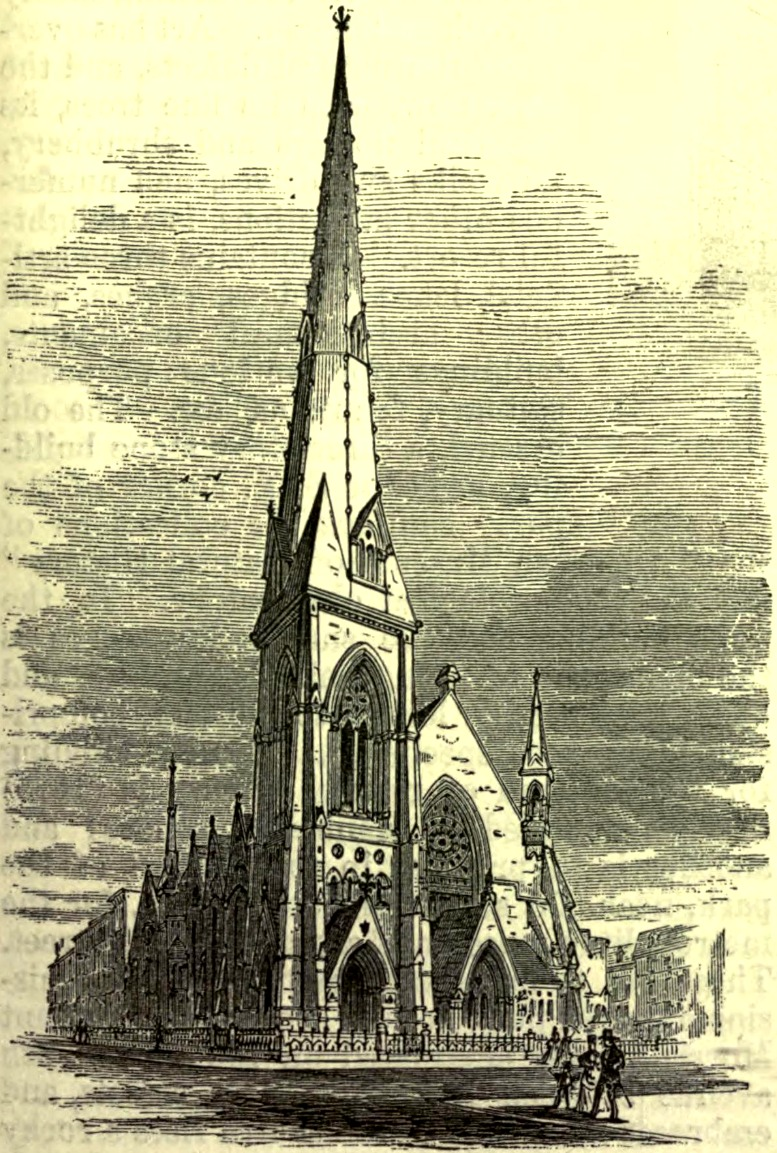
- From The American Cyclopædia of 1879
- Interactive map of the St. Nicholas Collegiate Reformed Protestant Dutch Church area

General information
- Architectural style: Gothic Revival architecture
- Location: New York City, United States
- Construction started: ?
- Completed: 1872
- Demolished: 1949
- Cost: ?

Technical details
- Structural system: Brownstone Gothic

Design and construction
- Architect: W. Wheeler Smith

St. Nicholas Collegiate Reformed Protestant Dutch Church was a Reformed Protestant Dutch church in Midtown Manhattan, New York City, which was Manhattan's oldest congregation when it was demolished in 1949. The church was on the northwest corner of Fifth Avenue and 48th Street near Rockefeller Center. The church was built in 1872 to Gothic Revival designs in brownstone by architect W. Wheeler Smith and "distinguished by an elegantly tapered spire that, according to John A. Bradley in The New York Times, 'many declare…the most beautiful in this country.'" The congregation dated to 1628.

St Nicholas's was the New York City church attended by Theodore Roosevelt, and a memorial service was held for him on January 30, 1919.

In the 1920s, during the construction of Rockefeller Center, the governing body of the Reformed Protestant Dutch Churches of New York considered putting the church up for sale, which prompted an early preservation campaign in New York with the Rev. Dr, Joseph R. Sizoo, the church's minister, arguing that the church was "a shrine" and its sale would put the dollar sign before the cross. Despite initial success, the pastor, Rev. Dr. Malcolm James MacLeod, later reneged on the church's intention to sell to the Rockefeller complex for as much as $7 million. The tension between the minister with congregation and the pro-sale church governing body led most of the congregation and Sizoo to leave. The governing body pitched the sale again in 1946, and after "considerable public debate", a deal was made in 1949. The church was demolished to make way for the Sinclair Oil Company Building at 596 (now 600) Fifth Avenue.

The bell of the church came from the Middle Collegiate Church, built in the 1830s on Lafayette Place (now Lafayette Street) after it was abandoned. After the demolition of St Nicholas's, the bell was relocated to the New Middle Collegiate Church on Second Avenue, Manhattan.
