= Gavin Berkeley =

Archdeacon of Killaloe

The Ven. Gavin Berkeley (1626–1691) was an English clergyman appointed in 1652 by Oliver Cromwell to administer the ecclesiastical needs of the district around Killaloe: he was Archdeacon of Killaloe from 1661 to 1667.
