= Edmond Knox =

Irish Anglican priest

Edmond Dalrymple Hesketh Knox was a 19th-century Anglican priest in Ireland.

The son of Bishop Edmund Knox, he was born in County Down and educated at Trinity College, Dublin. He held livings in Upper Badoney; Rathronan and Kilflyn. He became Archdeacon of Killaloe in 1832. In 1858 a wills and administration document records him as a lunatic yet he is recorded in the 1868 Crockford's as still being Archdeacon.
