= Ernest Murray =

Ernest Cyril Murray was an English-Irish Anglican Archdeacon who served in Ireland.

Murray was educated at King's College, London and ordained in 1933. He served at St Luke, Belfast (Curate); St. Columba's College, Hazaribagh (lecturer); the SPG (secretary, Ireland); Shinrone (incumbent); Upper Ormond (rural dean); and Killaloe Cathedral (canon). He was Archdeacon of Killaloe from 1954 to 1974.
