= Alexander Hyatt King =

English musicologist and bibliographer (1911–1995)

Alexander Hyatt King, also known as Alec Hyatt King, (18 July 1911 in Beckenham, London – 10 March 1995 in Southwold, Suffolk) was an English musicologist and bibliographer, who was a music librarian of the British Museum and leading scholar on Wolfgang Amadeus Mozart.

== Education and career ==
King was educated at Dulwich College and King's College, Cambridge.

He began his career at the British Museum as a cataloguer in February 1934; a post he remained in until December 1944 when he succeeded William Charles Smith as Superintendent of the Music Room. He remained in that position until 1973 when he was named Music Librarian of the Reference Division at the British Library. He also concurrently served as the British Museum's Deputy Keeper of the Department of Printed Books from 1959 until his retirement in 1976. He was involved in the early days of the British Institute of Recorded Sound: as chairman in 1952 he helped find accommodation for the collection within the British Museum.

He held the Sandars Readership in Bibliography in 1961, lecturing on British music collectors.

Hyatt King married art historian Evelyn Davies in 1943 and there were two sons. In the 1950s, they were living at 19, Rudall Crescent, London, NW3. He moved to Southwold in Suffolk for his final years and is buried in Reydon churchyard.

== Selected bibliography ==
See Scott 2001 for a complete bibliography

- King, A. Hyatt. (1970). Mozart: A Biography: With a Survey of Books, Editions & Recordings. [Hamden, Conn.]: Archon Books : C. Bingley.
- King, Alexander Hyatt (1979). Printed Music in the British Museum: an Account of the Collections, the Catalogues, and their Formation, up to 1920. London: Clive Bingley. OCLC 833669674.
- —— (1983). A Wealth of Music: In the Collections of the British Library (Reference Division) and the British Museum. London: Clive Bingley. ISBN 978-0-85157-330-4. OCLC 864878373.
- —— (1984). A Mozart Legacy: Aspects of the British Library Collections. London: British Library. ISBN 978-0-7123-0044-5. OCLC 11773359.
