= 361 Broadway =

Building in Manhattan, New York

- U.S. National Register of Historic Places
- New York State Register of Historic Places
- New York City Landmark
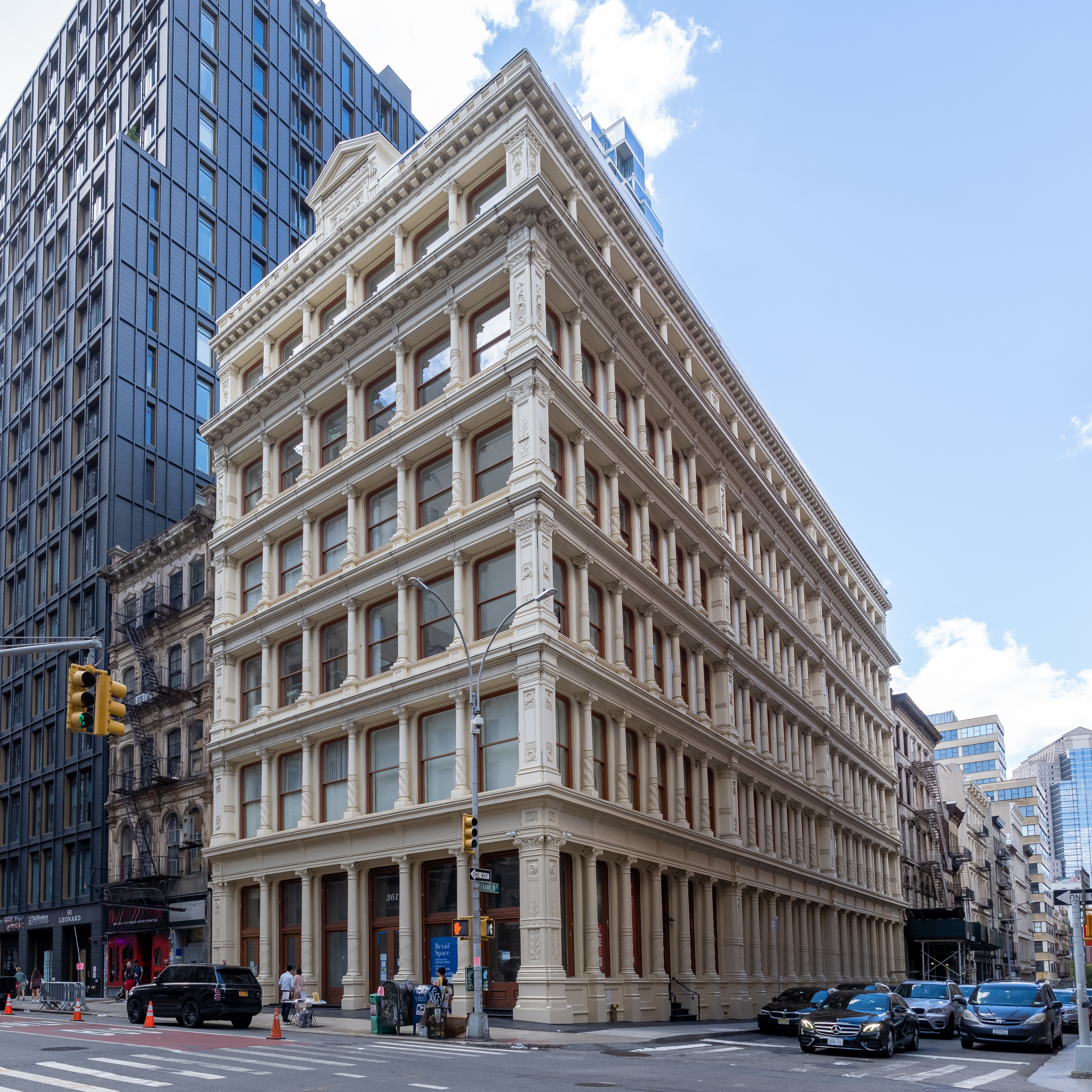

- Location within Lower Manhattan Location within New York City Location within New York Location within the United States
- Location: 361 Broadway at Franklin Street, Manhattan, New York City
- Coordinates: 40°43′03″N 74°00′14″W
- Built: 1881–1882
- Architect: W. Wheeler Smith (original); Shigeru Ban (renovation architect)
- Architectural style: Italianate
- NRHP reference No.: 83001718
- NYSRHP No.: 06101.001401
- NYCL No.: 1225

Significant dates
- Added to NRHP: September 15, 1983
- Designated NYSRHP: March 13, 1983
- Designated NYCL: July 27, 1982

Cast Iron House (361 Broadway) at the corner of Franklin Street and Broadway in the Tribeca neighborhood of Manhattan, New York City, formerly known as the James White Building, was built in 1881–82 and was designed by W. Wheeler Smith in the Italianate style. It features a cast-iron facade, and is a good example of late cast-iron architecture. The building was renovated by architect Joseph Pell Lombardi in 2000, and a restoration of the facade began in 2009. The building once housed the offices of Scientific American from 1884 to 1915, but it was primarily used in connection with the textile trade.

The building was designated a New York City landmark on July 27, 1982, and was added to the National Register of Historic Places on September 15, 1983.

In 2014, Shigeru Ban Architects announced plans to convert the James White Building into a 13-unit luxury condominium building, known as the Cast Iron House. A gut renovation was completed in 2021, with contemporary double-height living spaces inserted behind the restored cast-iron façade. As part of the project, the existing floor slabs were removed, and the six-story structure was expanded to seven stories. A two-story penthouse structure, with two duplex apartments, was installed on the roof of 361 Broadway using a Vierendeel truss system. To avoid adding stress to the historic façade, the independent structural system was devised to manage the additional load of the new penthouse floor using the existing foundation.

== See also ==
- List of New York City Landmarks
- National Register of Historic Places listings in Manhattan below 14th Street
