= William Smith (cricketer, born 1882) =

English cricketer

Personal information
- Full name: William John Smith
- Born: 13 May 1882; Freasley, Warwickshire, England
- Batting: Right-handed
- Bowling: Right-arm fast-medium

Domestic team information
- Years: Team
- 1906: Warwickshire

Career statistics
Competition	First-class
Matches	1
Runs scored	0
Batting average	0.00
100s/50s	–/–
Top score	0
Balls bowled	138
Wickets	2
Bowling average	46.50
5 wickets in innings	–
10 wickets in match	–
Best bowling	2/83
Catches/stumpings	–/–
- Source: Cricinfo, 27 December 2011

William John Smith (13 May 1882 – date of death unknown) was an English cricketer. Smith was a right-handed batsman who bowled right-arm fast-medium. He was born at Freasley, Warwickshire.

Smith made a single first-class appearance for Warwickshire against Hampshire at Edgbaston in the 1906 County Championship. Hampshire made 261 in their first-innings, with Smith taking the wickets of Phil Mead and William Jephson to finish with figures of 2/83 from 21 overs. In response Warwickshire made 493 in their first-innings, with Smith being dismissed for a duck by Mead. Hampshire ended their second-innings, in which Smith bowled 2 wicketless overs, on 64/1. The match ended in a draw. This was his only major appearance for Warwickshire.
