= Clinton College (Tennessee) =

Clinton College was a private college in New Middleton, Smith County, Tennessee. It was established in 1830 as Porter's Hill Academy.

== History ==
Clinton College was founded as a college for young men by Francis Haynes Gordon in 1830 as Porter's Hill Academy and assumed the final name in 1833. By February 1842 Clinton College had failed.

== Notable alumni ==
- Edmund Pettus
- Simon Pollard Hughes, Jr.
