= William Smythe =

William Smythe may refer to:

- W. E. Smythe (William Ellsworth Smythe, 1861–1922), journalist, writer and founder of the Little Landers movement
- William Smythe (physicist) (1893–1988), American physicist and mentor of six Nobel Prize laureates
- William James Smythe (1816–1887), general and colonel-commandant of the Royal Artillery
- William Smythe (academic), Oxford college head
- Harry Smythe (William Henry Smythe, 1904–1980), pitcher in Major League Baseball
- William Smythe of the Smythe baronets
- William Smythe (geophysicist) and namesake of Smythe Shoulder

== See also ==
- William Smyth (disambiguation)
- William Smith (disambiguation)
