= Simon P. Hughes Jr. =

15th governor of Arkansas

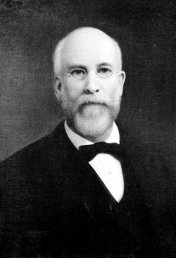

Associate Justice of the Arkansas Supreme Court
- In office 1889–1904
- Preceded by: Elhanan J. Searle
- Succeeded by: Edgar A. McCulloch

15th Governor of Arkansas
- In office January 17, 1885 – January 8, 1889
- Preceded by: James H. Berry
- Succeeded by: James P. Eagle

14th Attorney General of Arkansas
- In office 1874–1876
- Preceded by: J. L. Witherspoon
- Succeeded by: W. F. Henderson

Member of the Arkansas House of Representatives from the Monroe County district
- In office November 5, 1866 – April 2, 1868
- Preceded by: E. Wilds
- Succeeded by: Constituency abolished

Personal details
- Born: April 14, 1830 Smith County, Tennessee, U.S.
- Died: June 29, 1906 (aged 76) Little Rock, Arkansas, U.S.
- Resting place: Mount Holly Cemetery, Little Rock, Arkansas, U.S. 34°44′15.3″N 92°16′42.5″W
- Party: Whig (before 1860); Democratic (1860–1906)
- Spouse: Ann E. Blakemore (m. 1857)
- Children: 9
- Education: Clinton College

Military service
- Allegiance: Confederate States
- Branch/service: Confederate States Army
- Years of service: 1862–1865
- Rank: Lieutenant-Colonel
- Unit: 23d Arkansas Infantry
- Battles/wars: American Civil War

Simon P. Hughes, Jr. (April 14, 1830 – June 29, 1906) was an American lawyer, jurist, and politician who served as the 15th governor of Arkansas from 1885 to 1889. He previously served as an officer of the Confederate States Army in the Western and Trans-Mississippi theaters of the American Civil War.

== Early life and education ==
Simon P. Hughes, Jr. was born in Smith County, Tennessee, the son of Simon P. Hughes and Mary Hubbard Hughes. Hughes Sr., originally from Prince Edward County, Virginia, was a farmer, sheriff and a member of the Tennessee legislature from 1842 to 1843, Mary Hubbard was a native of Oglethorpe County, Georgia. In 1842, Mary Hughes died and the family moved to Bowie County, Texas. Hughes Sr. died in Texas in 1844, making Hughes at orphan at the age of fourteen.

Hughes moved to Arkansas in December 1849, and was educated at Sylvan Academy and Clinton College in Tennessee. In 1853, Hughes was elected sheriff of Monroe County, Arkansas and served for two years. Hughes was admitted to the bar in Arkansas in 1857, and started private practice in Clarendon, Arkansas. During the American Civil War, he was elected captain in the 23d Arkansas Infantry of the Confederate States Army rising to the rank of lieutenant-colonel. Later in the war, following a reorganization of the 23d Arkansas, Hughes enlisted as a private in Charles L. Morgan's Independent Texas Cavalry unit.

== Political career ==
Following the war, Hughes served in the Arkansas House of Representatives from 1866 to 1867, and was a delegate to the 1874 Arkansas Constitutional Convention. Hughes formed a law practice with William W. Smith in Clarendon, Arkansas and became involved in Democratic politics. He was elected to the post of Arkansas Attorney General and served from 1874 to 1877. He was elected governor of Arkansas, being sworn in, in January 1885. He was reelected in 1886. During his terms, public executions were abolished in Arkansas and the sale of liquor was restricted.

In 1889, he was elected to the Arkansas Supreme Court as an associate justice and served in that capacity for sixteen years.

== Death ==
Hughes died in Little Rock, Arkansas, and is buried in historic Mount Holly Cemetery at Little Rock.

Arkansas House of Representatives
Preceded by E. Wilds	Member of the Arkansas House of Representatives from Monroe County; 1866–1868	Constituency abolished
Party political offices
Preceded by James Henderson Berry	Democratic nominee for Governor of Arkansas; 1884, 1886	Succeeded by James Philip Eagle
Political offices
Preceded by James Henderson Berry	Governor of Arkansas; 1885–1889	Succeeded by James Philip Eagle
Preceded by Elhanan J. Searle	Justice of the Arkansas Supreme Court; 1889–1904	Succeeded by Edgar A. McCulloch
