= David Murray (educator) =

American educator and government adviser in Meiji period Japan

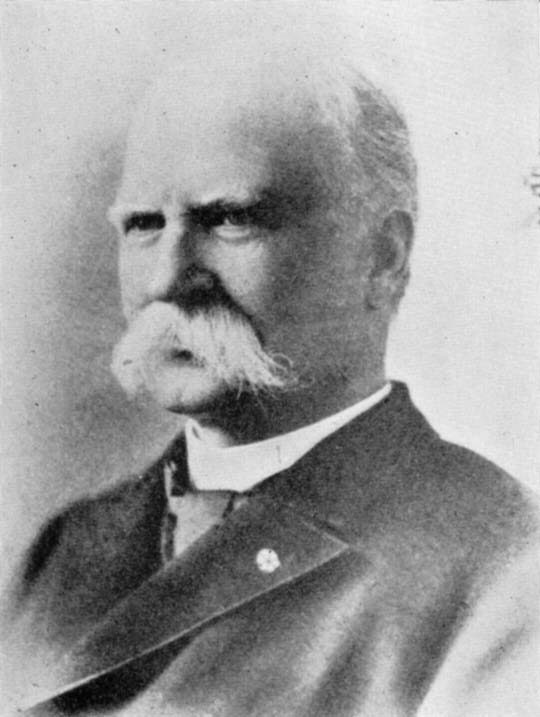
- Born: October 15, 1830; Bovina, New York
- Died: March 6, 1905 (aged 74); New Brunswick, New Jersey
- Occupation: Educator

David Murray (ダビッド・モルレー, Dabiddo Morurē; October 15, 1830 – March 6, 1905) was an American educator and government adviser in Meiji period Japan.

== Early life ==
Murray graduated from Union College in 1852.

== Educator ==
During 1857–1863, Murray was as principal of The Albany Academy in New York. From 1863 to 1873, he was a professor of mathematics, natural philosophy and astronomy at Rutgers College in New Jersey. Together with George Cook, Murray developed a full science curriculum at Rutgers, and successfully lobbied for Rutgers to be named the state's land grant college. Their 1864-67 surveys established the marine boundary between New York and New Jersey, and their 1872 survey fixed the land boundary between New York and New Jersey. Murray was also responsible for the building of Rutgers' first astronomical observatory, the Daniel S. Schanck Observatory. In 1873, Murray departed Rutgers to become the educational advisor for the Japanese government. After his return, Murray served on the Rutgers College board of trustees from 1892 until his death in 1905.

In Japan, he was Superintendent of Educational Affairs in the Imperial Ministry of Education from 1873 through 1879.

== Selected works ==
In a statistical overview derived from writings by and about David Murray, OCLC/WorldCat encompasses roughly 40+ works in 100+ publications in 2 languages and 1,000+ library holdings.

- Petroleum its History and Properties. 1862.
- Manual of Land Surveying : with Tables. New York J.W. Schermerhorn. 1875.
- Japanese Education, Introductory chapter. 1876.
- The Story of Japan. Story of the Nations. NY: G. P. Putnam's Sons. 1894.
- The Development of Modern Education in Japan (1904)
- Japan. Continuing the History to the Close of 1905, with the Provisions of the Treaty of Portsmouth Between Russia and Japan (1906)
