= Daniel S. Schanck Observatory =

Historical astronomical observatory in New Brunswick, New Jersey

Coordinates: 40°29′57.7″N 74°26′43″W

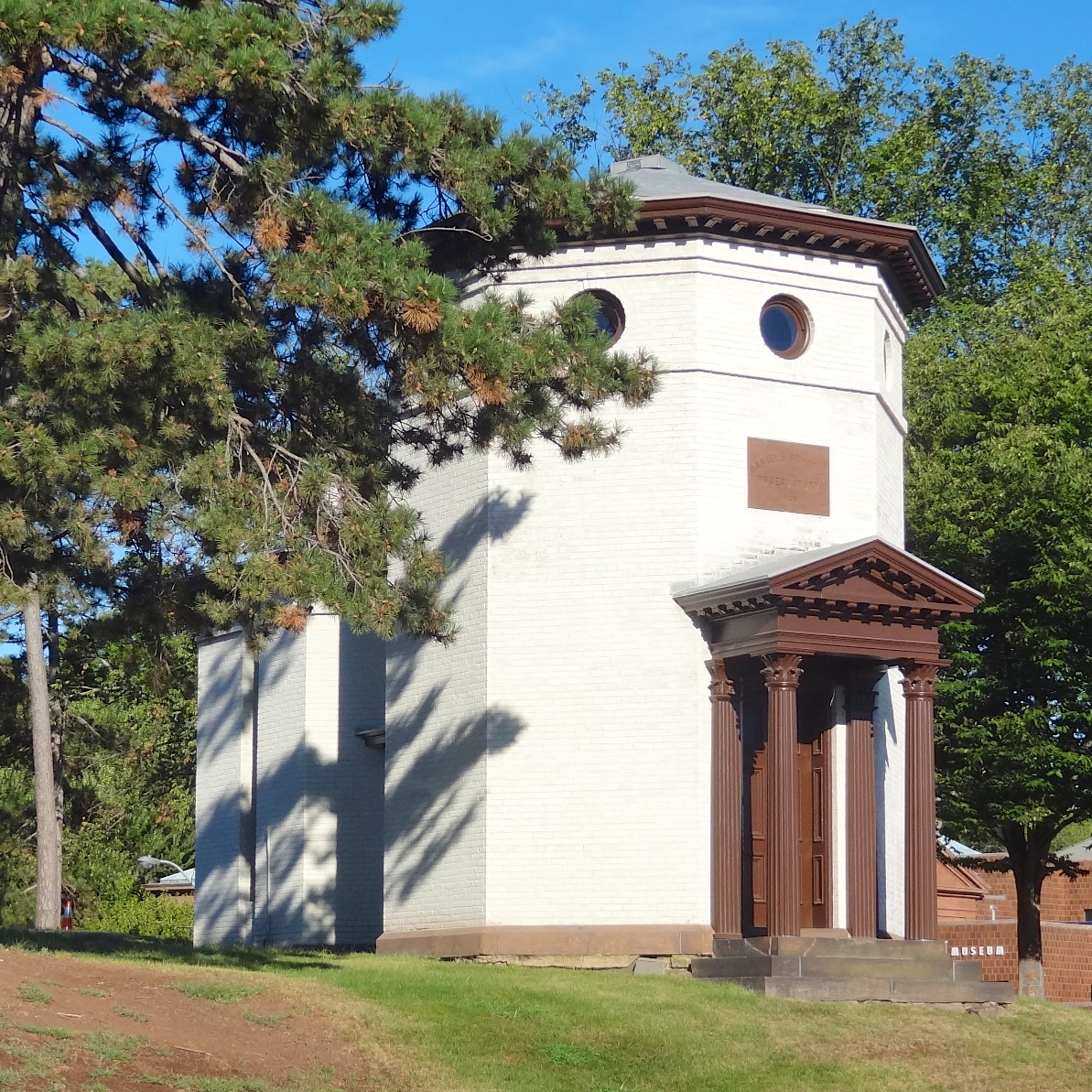
The Daniel S. Schanck Observatory as seen from George Street in 2014.

The Daniel S. Schanck Observatory is an historical astronomical observatory on the Queens Campus of Rutgers University in New Brunswick, New Jersey, United States. It is located on George Street near the corner with Hamilton Street, opposite the parking lot adjacent to Kirkpatrick Chapel, and to the northeast of Old Queens and Geology Hall.

The two-story observatory was designed by architect Willard Smith in the Roman Revival style and modeled after the Tower of the Winds in Athens, which dates from 50 BC. The cornerstone of the Observatory was placed in 1865 and construction was completed in 1866, making it tied for the seventh oldest observatory in the U.S. (alongside the Vassar College Observatory). It was named after New York City businessman Daniel S. Schanck, who donated a large portion of the funds to construct and equip the observatory. Outfitted with telescopes, clocks, and other scientific equipment donated to Rutgers, the Schanck Observatory served as the university's first building of science and was used to provide instruction to its students from the mid-nineteenth through the late-twentieth centuries.

As part of the Queens Campus, the Schanck Observatory was included on the New Jersey Register of Historic Places and the National Register of Historic Places in 1973. It was last used by the faculty to teach astronomy in 1979. The building was renovated in 2016 through a joint project of The Cap & Skull Society, an honors and service organization at Rutgers, and the Rutgers School of Arts and Sciences, and is jointly managed by them. The scientific centerpiece of the observatory, a 150-mm (6-inch) equatorial refractor telescope manufactured by Georges Prin of Paris and donated to Rutgers College by John Wyckoff Mettler in 1929, was restored to operation during 2016-2018 through the efforts of Rutgers alumni, friends of the university, and Rutgers' Department of Physics and Astronomy. Since the completion of the renovation of the building, alumni and volunteers have hosted daytime guided tours of the historic observatory and vintage telescope on special occasions, such as Rutgers Day.

== History, architecture, and use ==
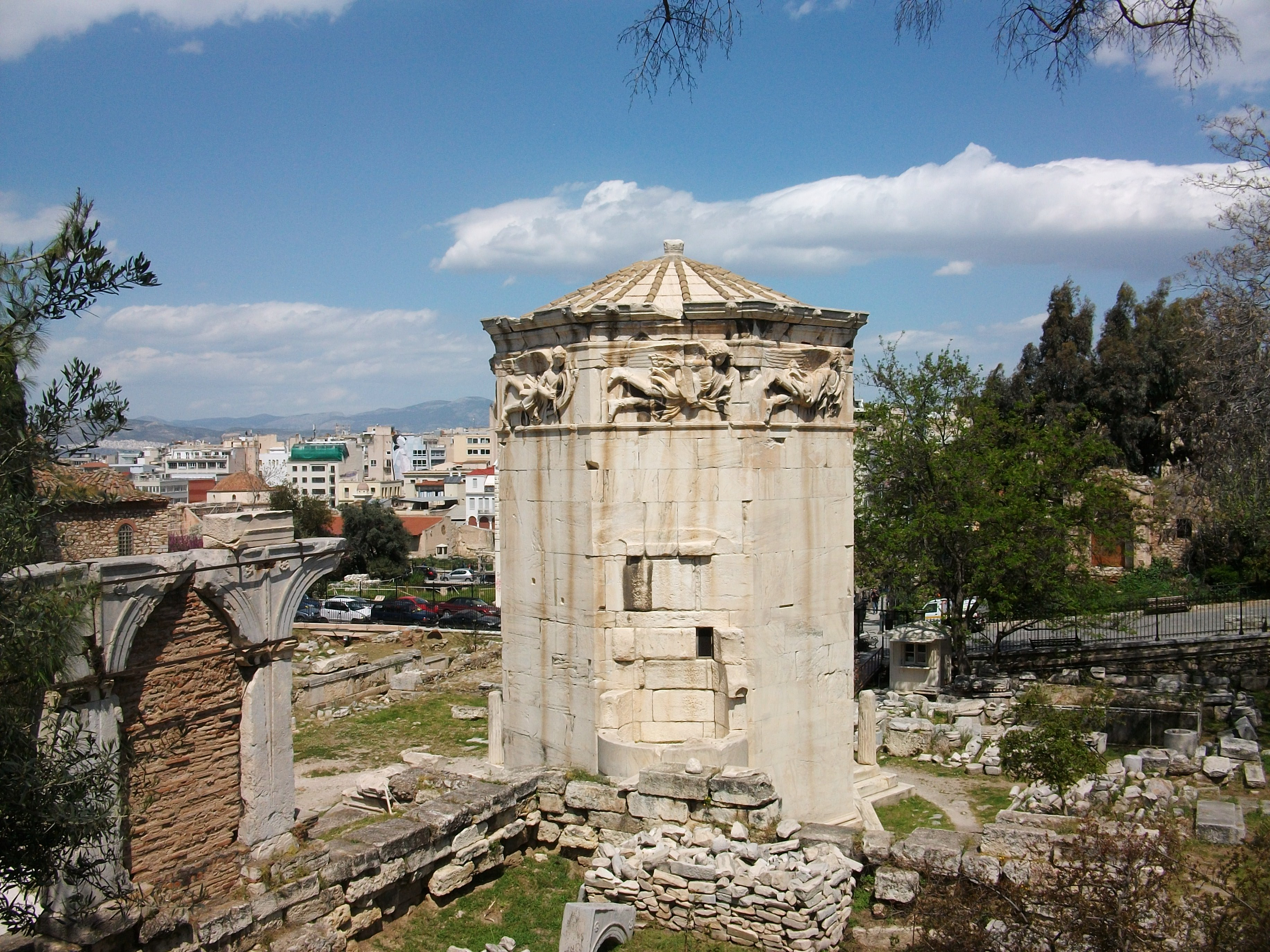
The octagonal building of the observatory was designed after the Tower of the Winds (pictured) in Athens, Greece

In 1864, Rutgers College (Note: Founded as Queen's College in 1766 and renamed after benefactor Henry Rutgers in 1825, Rutgers College subsequently would be renamed Rutgers University in 1924 and Rutgers, The State University of New Jersey in 1945.) was named New Jersey's sole land grant college which provided federal funding under the Morrill Act of 1862 for the development of engineering, scientific, agricultural, and military education. Previously, the college's curriculum focused on the classics and liberal arts. David Murray (1830–1905), professor of mathematics, natural philosophy and astronomy, proposed building the school's first astronomical observatory to the college's president, William Henry Campbell (1808–1890), and its board of trustees. It would be the college's fourth building and the first building dedicated solely to science at Rutgers. (Note: According to Robbins, and McCormick, supra, Rutgers built (1) Old Queens for classrooms, faculty housing, and a small chapel; (2) a house for the school's president; (3) Van Nest Hall to house the school's two literary societies, and (4) the Schanck Observatory, an astronomical observatory.)

The cost of construction and equipment amounted to US$6,166 (2013: US$86,845.07), (Note: This inflation adjustment calculation projects that $1 in 1865 would have $14.08 in purchasing power in 2013 (conversion factor: 0.071), using data compiled by Oregon State University Political Science professor Robert Sahr in "Inflation Conversion Factors for years 1774 to estimated 2023, in dollars of recent years" reflecting final 2012 CPI (2.29594 in dollars of 1982–84). Last update May 15, 2013. Retrieved September 2, 2013.) of which US$2,400 (2013: US$33,802.82) was donated by Daniel S. Schanck (1812–1872). Schanck, a New York City businessman with roots in Monmouth County, New Jersey, was not an alumnus of the college, but was convinced to donate after being approached by friends of the college. Several years later, his son, Daniel S. Schanck (1853–1901), would enroll in the college's scientific course, and earn a bachelor's degree (Sc.B) in 1875.

In 1865, the trustees hired architect Willard Smith who provided a plan for a small two-story octagonal Roman Revival building designed after the Tower of the Winds, a first-century BC structure located in the agora of Athens, Greece that housed an ancient water clock and sundial. The observatory was constructed from "painted brick, with wood cornices and entrance porch, brownstone floor and steps" and featured a "small gable roofed Corinthian entrance porch with columns at the front corners, flat pilasters against the wall, entablature, and pediment." Rutgers equipped the observatory with "a 6.5-inch equatorial refracting telescope, a meridian circle with four-inch object glass for transit observations, a sidereal clock, a mean solar clock...chronograph, repeating circle, and other instruments." Some of the equipment was donated by private individuals and by the college's two literary societies, the Peithessophian and Philoclean Societies.

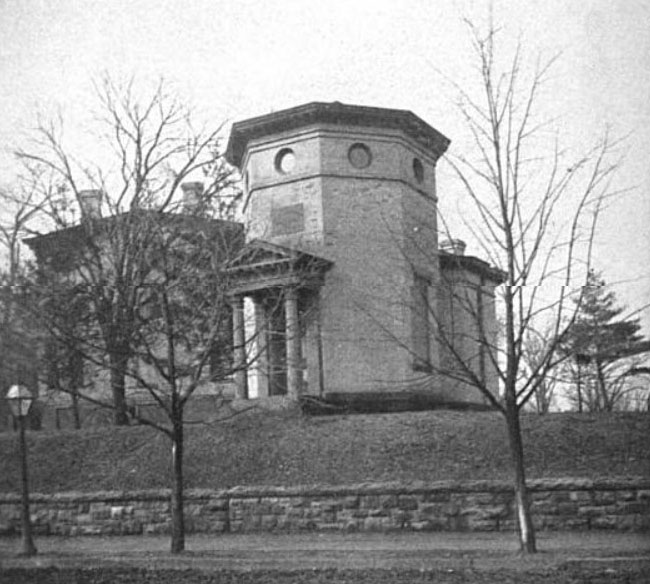
The Daniel S. Schanck Observatory as seen from George Street in c. 1901. In the background is the President's House, which was demolished in 1944.

The Schanck Observatory was dedicated on June 18, 1866, with an address given by Joseph P. Bradley (1813–1892), a Rutgers College alumnus (AB 1836) and prominent attorney who four years later was installed as an Associate Justice on the Supreme Court of the United States. The observatory has experienced several periods of use and neglect during the twentieth century. Physics and Astronomy professor Paul L. Leath indicated that the observatory very accurately measured time through precise measurements of the transit of the sun.

The observatory fell out of use before 1960, but was revived by Prof. Maurice Bazin of the Physics Department and used by student members of the Rutgers Astronomical Society between 1968 and 1976. It was last used for the instruction of students by Prof. Terry Matilsky during 1976–1979. The university's astronomy department operates a modern observatory—the Robert A. Schommer Astronomical Observatory—that is located on the roof of the Serin Physics Laboratory (built 1963) on the Busch Campus. The Schommer Observatory houses a 0.5 meter telescope that was installed in 1996.

As one of the six extant buildings on the university's Queens Campus, the oldest buildings at Rutgers, the Schanck Observatory was included on the New Jersey Register of Historic Places and the National Register of Historic Places in 1973.

The building fell into disrepair, and its equipment was damaged after several acts of vandalism in which unknown persons illegally entered the building and stole key components of the telescope. A restoration of the observatory building by Wu & Associates of Cherry Hill, New Jersey, was completed in 2012.

== See also ==
- List of astronomical observatories
