= Donat O'Kennedy =

Donat O'Kennedy was Archdeacon then Bishop of Killaloe from 1231 until 1252.
