= Edmund Pettus =

American politician (1821–1907)

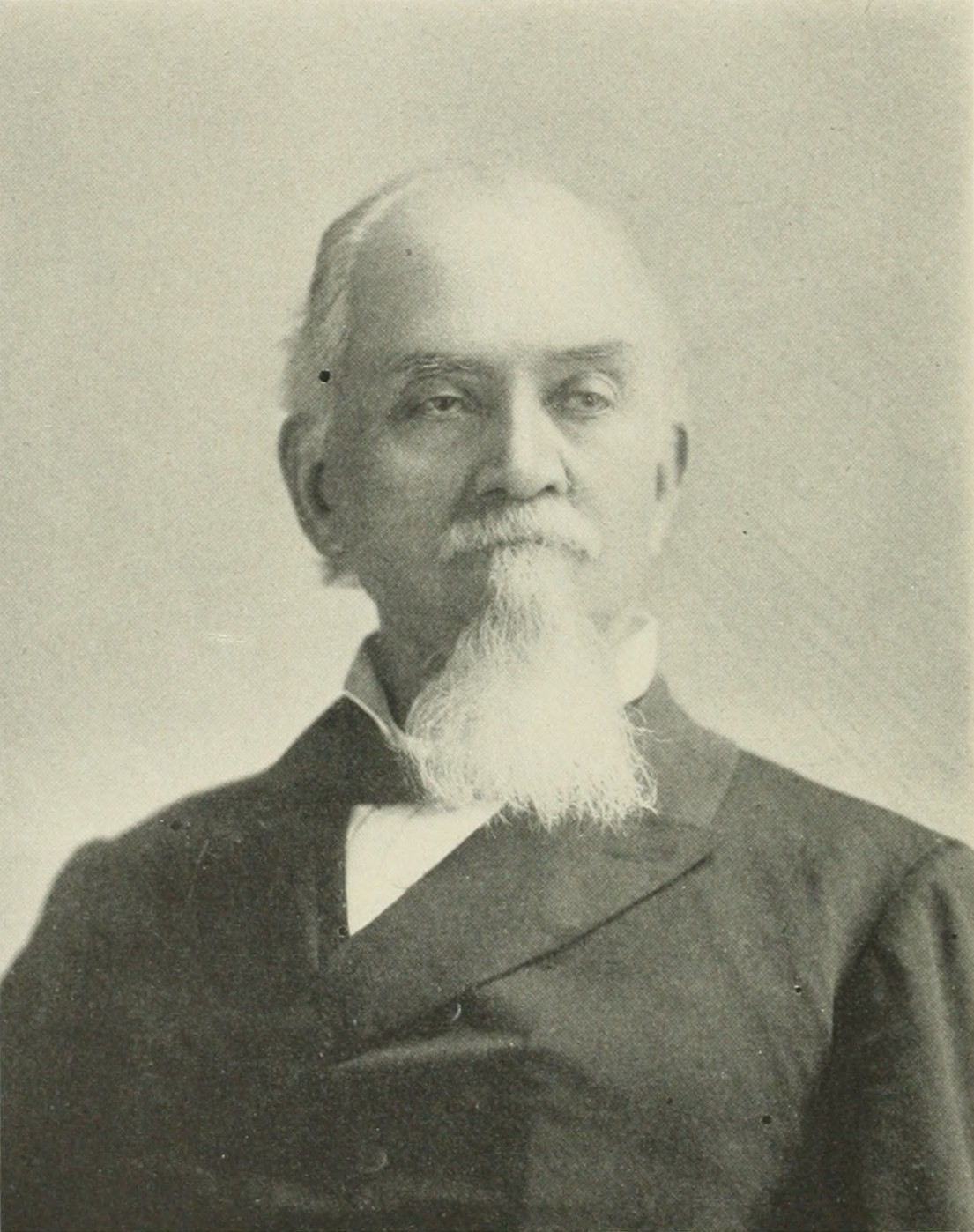
- Pettus in 1899

United States Senator from Alabama
- In office March 4, 1897 – July 27, 1907
- Preceded by: James L. Pugh
- Succeeded by: Joseph F. Johnston

Personal details
- Born: Edmund Winston Pettus; July 6, 1821 Limestone County, Alabama, U.S.
- Died: July 27, 1907 (aged 86) Hot Springs, North Carolina, U.S.
- Party: Democratic
- Relations: John J. Pettus (brother); Caroline Randall Williams (great-great granddaughter)
- Education: Clinton College

Military service
- Allegiance: United States; Confederate States
- Branch/service: United States Volunteers; Confederate States Army
- Years of service: 1847–1849 (U.S.); 1861–1865 (C.S.)
- Rank: Lieutenant (U.S.); Brigadier-General (C.S.)
- Battles/wars: Mexican–American War; American Civil War: Stones River Campaign (POW); Vicksburg Campaign (POW); Chattanooga Campaign; Atlanta Campaign; Campaign of the Carolinas (WIA) (POW)

Edmund Winston Pettus (July 6, 1821 – July 27, 1907) was an American lawyer, politician and military officer who represented Alabama in the United States Senate from 1897 to 1907. He served as a senior officer of the Confederate States Army, commanding infantry in the Western Theater of the American Civil War. After the war, he was Grand Dragon, or supreme leader, of the Ku Klux Klan, which terrorized and often killed African Americans.

A bridge across the Alabama River in Selma, built in 1940, was named after him. According to Smithsonian, "The bridge was named for him, in part, to memorialize his history, of restraining and imprisoning African Americans in their quest for freedom after the Civil War". In 1965, the bridge became a landmark of the civil rights movement.

== Early life and career ==
Edmund Pettus was born in 1821 in Limestone County, Alabama. He was the youngest of nine children of John Pettus and Alice Taylor Winston, a brother of John J. Pettus, and a distant cousin of Jefferson Davis. Pettus was educated in local public schools, and later graduated from Clinton College located in Smith County, Tennessee.

Pettus then studied law under William Cooper in Tuscumbia, Alabama and was admitted to the bar in 1842. Shortly afterward, he settled in Gainesville and began practicing as a lawyer. On June 27, 1844, Pettus married Mary L. Chapman, with whom he had three sons, two of whom died in infancy, and two daughters. Also that year he was elected solicitor for the seventh Judicial Circuit of Alabama.

During the Mexican–American War in 1846–48, Pettus served as a lieutenant with the Alabama Volunteers, and after the end of hostilities he moved to California.

By 1853, he returned to Alabama, serving again in the seventh circuit as solicitor. He was appointed a judge in that circuit in 1855 until resigning in 1858. Pettus then relocated to the now extinct town of Cahaba in Dallas County, Alabama, where he again took up work as a lawyer.

== American Civil War ==
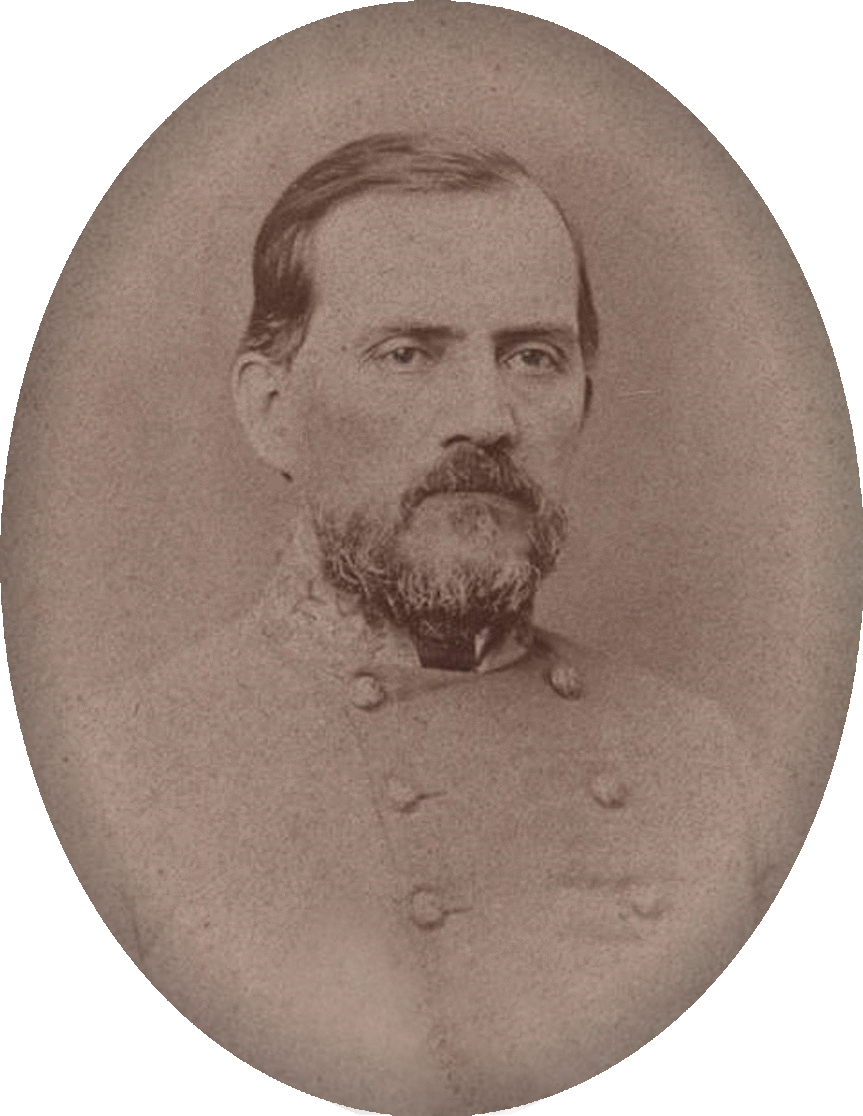
Pettus in uniform, ca. 1863

In 1861, Pettus, an enthusiastic champion of the Confederate cause and of slavery, was a Democratic Party delegate to the secession convention in Mississippi, where his brother John was serving as governor. Pettus helped organize the 20th Alabama Infantry, and was elected as one of its first officers. On September 9, he was made the regiment's major, and on October 8, he became its lieutenant colonel.

Pettus served in the Western Theater of the American Civil War. During the Stones River Campaign, he was captured by Union soldiers on December 29, 1862, and exchanged a short time later for Union soldiers. Pettus was captured again on May 1, 1863, while part of the surrendered garrison that had been defending Port Gibson in Mississippi. He managed to escape and return to his own lines. Pettus was promoted to colonel on May 28, and given command of the 20th Alabama.

During the 1863 Vicksburg Campaign, Pettus and his regiment were part of the force defending Confederate control of the Mississippi River. When the garrison surrendered on July 4, Pettus was again a prisoner until his exchange on September 12. Six days later he was promoted to the rank of brigadier general, and on November 3 he was given brigade command in the Army of Tennessee. Pettus and his brigade participated in the Chattanooga Campaign, posted on the extreme southern slope of Missionary Ridge on November 24, and fought during the action the following day.

Pettus and his command took part in the 1864 Atlanta Campaign, fighting in the battles of Kennesaw Mountain on June 27, Atlanta on July 22, and Jonesborough from August 31 to September 1. Beginning on December 17, he temporarily led a division in the Army of Tennessee. During the 1865 Campaign of the Carolinas, Pettus was sent to defend Columbia, South Carolina, and fought at Bentonville from March 19–21. Pettus was wounded in this fight, hit in his right leg during the battle's first day. On May 2 he was paroled from Salisbury, North Carolina, and, four months after the Confederacy surrendered, Pettus was pardoned by U.S. President Andrew Johnson on October 20.

== Later life and career ==
After the war, Edmund Pettus returned to Alabama and resumed his law practice in Selma. Pettus served as chairman of the state delegation to the Democratic National Convention for more than two decades. In 1877, during the final year of Reconstruction, Pettus was named Grand Dragon of the Alabama Ku Klux Klan. With earnings from his law practice, he bought farm land.

In 1896, at the age of 75, Pettus ran for the U.S. Senate as a Democrat and won, beating incumbent James L. Pugh. The state legislature, rather than state voters, elected United States senators at that time. His campaign relied on his successes in organizing and popularizing the Alabama Klan and his prominent opposition to the constitutional amendments following the Civil War that elevated former slaves to the status of free citizens. On March 4, 1897, he began service in the U.S. Senate. The state legislature re-elected him on January 26, 1903, and January 22, 1907. This term would begin two years later in 1909.

Pettus died at Hot Springs, North Carolina, in the summer of 1907, at age 86, while still in office and elected for the next term. He is buried in Live Oak Cemetery in Selma.

== Legacy ==
Military historian Ezra J. Warner wrote that Pettus was "a fearless and dogged fighter and distinguished himself on many fields in the western theater of war" and after his promotion to a general officer "he followed with conspicuous bravery every forlorn hope which the Confederacy offered..." Likewise historian Jon L. Wakelyn summed up his military career by saying " … he volunteered for service in the Confederate Army and distinguished himself in the western command." As a U.S. senator, Pettus was "the last of the Confederate brigadiers to sit in the upper house of the national Congress."

=== Edmund Pettus Bridge ===
In 1940, a bridge across the Alabama River in Selma was named after him. In 1965, it became a civil rights movement landmark when 525 to 600 civil rights marchers on their way from Selma to Montgomery tried to cross the bridge, but were turned back and attacked by Alabama state troopers and members of the Ku Klux Klan. This event has since been called Bloody Sunday.

In 2020, Pettus’ great-great-granddaughter Caroline Randall Williams, Vanderbilt University writer-in-residence, proposed renaming the bridge after John Lewis because "We name things after honorable Americans to commemorate their legacies. That bridge is named after a treasonous American who cultivated and prospered from systems of degradation and oppression before and after the Civil War."

Writing in the New York Times, Williams argued:

I don’t just come from the South. I come from Confederates. I’ve got rebel-gray blue blood coursing my veins. My great-grandfather Will was raised with the knowledge that Edmund Pettus was his father. Pettus, the storied Confederate general, the grand dragon of the Ku Klux Klan, the man for whom Selma’s Bloody Sunday Bridge is named. So I am not an outsider who makes these demands. I am a great-great-granddaughter […] [Here’s] the thing: our ancestors don’t deserve your unconditional pride. Yes, I am proud of every one of my black ancestors who survived slavery. They earned that pride, by any decent person’s reckoning. But I am not proud of the white ancestors whom I know, by virtue of my very existence, to be bad actors.

— ”You Want a Confederate Monument? My Body Is a Confederate Monument,” Caroline Randall Williams

At least one other Pettus descendant, Dave Pettus, supports renaming the bridge "Bloody Sunday Bridge."

== See also ==
- List of Confederate States Army generals
- List of members of the United States Congress who died in office (1900–1949)

U.S. Senate
Preceded by James L. Pugh	U.S. senator (Class 3) from Alabama; 1897–1907; Served alongside: John T. Morgan, John H. Bankhead	Succeeded by Joseph F. Johnston
Honorary titles
Preceded by Daniel T. Jewett	Oldest living U.S. senator October 7, 1906 – July 27, 1907	Succeeded by John Conness
