= William Schmidt =

William Schmidt may refer to:

- William Schmidt (composer) (1926–2009), American composer of classical music
- William A. Schmidt (1902–1992), Wisconsin state senator
- William "Burro" H. Schmidt (1871–1954), builder of the Burro Schmidt Tunnel
- William R. Schmidt (1889–1966), United States Army officer
- Bill Schmidt (born 1947), American Olympic javelin thrower
- Billy Schmidt (1887–1975), Australian rules footballer
- Billy Schmidt (baseball) (1861–1928), American baseball player
- William Schmidt (pitcher) (born 2005), American baseball player

== See also ==
- Wilhelm Schmidt (disambiguation)
- William Smith (disambiguation)
