= Wilhelm Schmidt =

Wilhelm Schmidt may refer to:

- Wilhelm Schmidt (engineer) (1858–1924), German engineer and inventor, nicknamed Hot Steam Schmidt due to his work with superheated steam
- Wilhelm Schmidt (historian) (1817–1901), Austrian-Moravian historian who has written on Romanian culture
- Wilhelm Schmidt (linguist) (1868–1954), Austrian linguist and anthropologist
- Wilhelm Adolf Schmidt (1812–1887), German historian
- Wilhelm Matthäus Schmidt (1883–1936), Austrian climatologist
- Wilhelm Schmidt (politician, born 1888), member of the WAV and later the DP, Germany
- Wilhelm Schmidt (politician, born 1898), member of the NSDAP, Germany
- Wilhelm Schmidt (politician, born 1944), member of the SPD, Germany

== See also ==
- William Schmidt (disambiguation)
- William Smith (disambiguation)
