= Billy Ray Smith =

Billy Ray Smith may refer to:

- Billy Ray Smith Sr. (1935–2001), American football defensive lineman
- Billy Ray Smith Jr. (1961–2026), American football linebacker for the San Diego Chargers
- Billy Ray Smith (politician) (1944–2026), American politician from Kentucky

== See also ==
- Billy Smith (disambiguation)
