= William Blood Smyth =

Archdeacon of Killaloe

William Augustine Blood Smyth MA was Archdeacon of Killaloe from 1927 until 1938.

Smyth was educated at Trinity College, Dublin and ordained in 1878. He served at Kenmare, Oldham and Lisson Grove (curacies); Kilgarvan, Dromod, Ballingarry and Kilfieragh (incumbencies). He was Canon of Killaloe from 1902 until 1913; and Treasurer from 1913 to 1927. He was a Prebendary of St Patrick's Cathedral, Dublin from 1920 and 1927. He was Rural Dean of O'Mullod from 1922; and the incumbent at Kilnasoolagh from 1922.
