= William Pitt Smith =

American physician, educator and theological writer

William Pitt Smith (1760 – 1796) was a U.S. physician, educator and theological writer.

Smith began his career serving in the General Hospital Department of the Continental Army during the American Revolution. He became Professor of Materia Medica at Columbia College in 1792.

Smith authored two books that espoused the tenets of Universalism: The Universalist; in Seven Letters to Amyntor (1787) and Observations on Conventions (1793). In his books, Smith argued that the notion of infinite and universal sin contradicted God's basic nature. Smith's writing also spoke positively of deism, noting its practitioners were "of amiable characters, or sense, learning and morality", and he argued that Universalism could serve as a bridge to connect the theological separation between deists and Christians.

Smith was elected as a member of the New York State legislature in January 1796, where he argued for the abolition of slavery. However, his political term was brief, as he died in February 1796 following complications from pneumonia.
