= O'Mullod =

Coordinates: 52.8667°N 8.4630°W

O'Mullod (Gaelic: Ui Bloid) was a sinecure benefice (Patron: Earl of Egremont) in the Diocese of Killaloe, County Clare, Province of Munster, Ireland.
