= William Smyth (priest, born 1683) =

Anglican priest

William Smyth, (1683–1759) was an 18th-century Anglican priest in Ireland.

Bishop Thomas Smyth, he was born in Raphoe and educated at Trinity College, Dublin. Smith was Dean of Ardfert from 1728 and Archdeacon of Meath holding both posts until 1732.
