= William Smith (shearer) =

Australian sheep shearer

William "Deucem" Smith
- Born: 1896; Bourke, New South Wales, Australia
- Died: 1947
- Occupation: Sheep shearer

William "Deucem" Smith (1896–1947) was an Australian sheep shearer. His character and skill with the shears earned him a reputation as the greatest shearer of the first half of the twentieth century.

== Life ==
Deucem was born of the Muruwari Aboriginal tribe in Bourke, New South Wales, in 1896. He sheared throughout New South Wales and southern Queensland between 1912 and 1947.

Deucem had five children: Bill, Val, Shirley, Larry and Gordon. All of his boys became shearers, taught by their father.

The nickname Deucem was coined in 1912 with the (successful) declaration that he would "deuce [out-shear] all the back-bent, bagbooted jumbuck barbers" at the Dunlop shearing shed at Darling.

Deucem spent the latter years of his life in Victoria and continued to use the nickname "Deucem" until his death.

He was interred at the Sprinvale Botanical Cemetery under the "full" name William Deucem Smith on 20 January 1949.

Deucem is survived by around 200 relatives living in and around Canberra, plus those around Bourke and Brewarrina NSW

== Shearing ==
He spent much of his professional life working the shearing sheds around Top Naas, Lanyon, Tuggeranong and Uriarra. Deucem's shearing feats include:

- consistently high tallies at a time when the difficult-to-shear Vermont Merino was introduced,
- shearing 290 stud merino two-tooth hoggets in a single day in 1936 at Mirrool Park, near Griffith, and
- shearing 1430 sheep in one week with a broken right thumb.

Deucem's shearing prowess is touted in the essay Champion Shearers of Australia (D'Arcy Niland, February 1943):

Rated as one of the greatest shearers in the world, who time out of number has eclipsed records and cleaned up the best of his natural competitors... Smith is regarded as more than a champion - a phenomenon. Even rival champions pay direct tributes to him. They talk in the sheds about how he bowled over champ after champ like ninepins. Near Drysdale, Deucem Smith, with a broken thumb on his right hand, the hand in which the handpiece is held, shore a week's tally of 1430.

== Legacy ==
In April 2005, Deucem was inducted into the Australian Shearer's Hall of Fame in Hay, NSW, the first Aboriginal person to be honoured. The hall honours shearers with exceptional skill, character and contribution to the shearing industry. His family donated the Hall of Fame silver shears trophy to the Australian Institute of Aboriginal and Torres Strait Islander Studies.

In June 2006, Deucem's skill as a shearer was recognised in the form of a plaque unveiled by the ACT Chief Minister, Jon Stanhope. The plaque forms part of the Canberra Heritage Trails project that tells the story of Canberra from the time of the Ngunnawal people onward.

A documentary about Deucem's life has been green lit and is currently in pre-production. It is being produced by Deucem's great-grandson Benjamin Smith, who is also working on a screenplay for a feature film of his ancestor's life.
