= Freasley =

Village in Warwickshire, England

Coordinates: 52.597°N 1.645°W

Freasley is a small village in Warwickshire, England. It has a church and a Grade II listed Hall.
