= William Wragg Smith =

American lawyer

William Wragg Smith (1808—1875) was the son of the U.S. statesman William Loughton Smith. He was a gentleman planter, lawyer, naturalist, translator and poet. He was the second-to-last owner of the Smith-Wragg Plantation, the last being his wife Mary Theresa Hedley Smith and their children, who moved to New York. He was also a founding member of the Elliott Natural History Society; Elliott was a founder of the Smithsonian Institution.

He authored several works, including:

- "The Last Canto of Childe Harold's Pilgrimage, translated and amplified from the French of Alphonse de Lamartine" [and other minor poems] (1842).
- "Autumn Coloring, Fall of the Leaf, Winter Habit of Trees and Shrubs in the Lower Country of South Carolina."
- "Sketch of the Seminole War and Sketches during a Campaign. By a Lieutenant of the Left Wing", which was published anonymously but subsequently attributed to "W.W. Smith" in some cases, and M.M. Cohen in others (some sources suggests the Cohen attribution was a mistake.) This book deals with wartime events, Florida botany, as well as Seminole language and customs.
- "Flora of the Lower Country of South Carolina Reviewed" (1859)
