= Willard Smith =

Willard Smith may refer to:

- Will Smith (born 1968), American musician and actor
- Willard J. Smith (1910–2000), U.S. Coast Guard commandant
- Willard M. Smith (1840–1918), American Medal of Honor recipient
- Willard G. Smith (1827–1903), Utah territorial legislator
- Willard Smith (high jumper) (1924–1992), winner of the high jump at the 1944 USA Outdoor Track and Field Championships
- Elias Willard Smith (1816–1886), American architect and civil engineer.
- Willard Smith, contestant on Survivor: Palau (2005)
