= W. Wheeler Smith =

American architect

William Wheeler Smith
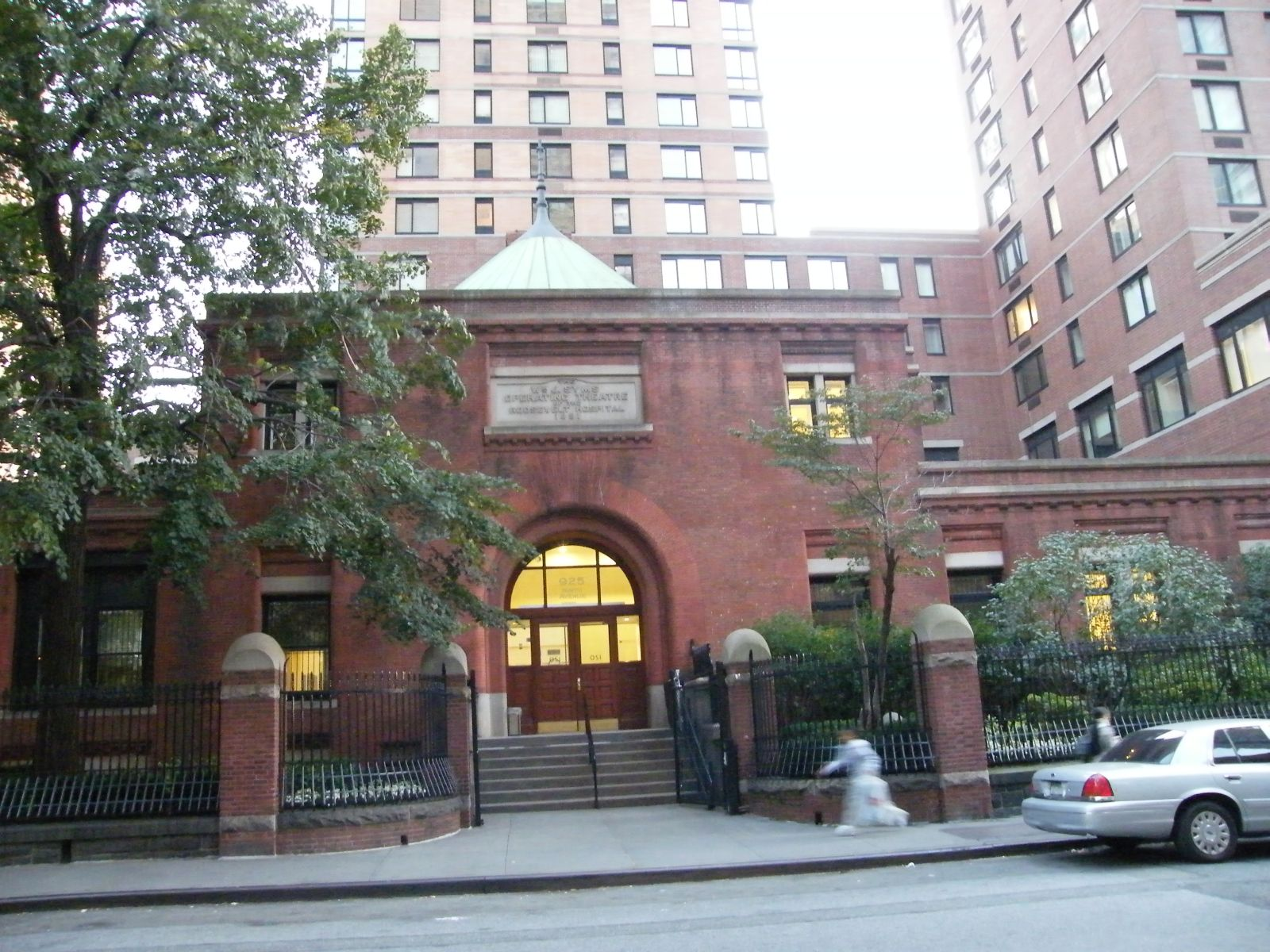
- William J. Syms Operating Theater of Roosevelt Hospital in Manhattan, New York
- Born: c. 1838
- Died: April 5th, 1908; New York City, New York
- Other name: W. Wheeler Smith
- Known for: Architect

William Wheeler Smith, AIA, (c. 1838- April 5, 1908) professionally known as "W. Wheeler Smith," was an American architect and developer active in late-nineteenth- and early-twentieth-century New York City. His home office (used at the end of his career) was located at 17 East 77th Street, New York City. He previously occupied 971 Madison Avenue.

Smith was a self-made millionaire and noted philanthropist. "He started as an apprentice in an architect's office and worked his way to the front rank of New York architects."

The most valuable properties he owned were 3, 5, and 7 Wall Street, 84 Broadway, "which were valued by Mr. Smith at $3,500,000 and on which is a mortgage of $1,400,000, and 71 Wall Street, valued at $550,000. A few years before Mr. Smith's death he decided to bequeath the revenue from the building at 71 Wall Street to the Association of the Relief of Respectable, Aged, and Indigent Females, at Amsterdam Avenue and 104th Street, and he made such a provision in his will, (which was revoked by a later codicil)."

== Works ==
His 1872 Gothic Revival design of St. Nicholas Collegiate Reformed Protestant Dutch Church, a Reformed Protestant Dutch church in Midtown, Manhattan, located on the northwest corner of Fifth Avenue and Forty-eight Street, built in brownstone was “distinguished by an elegantly tapered spire that, according to John A. Bradley in the New York Times, ‘many declare…the most beautiful in this country.’” The congregation dated back to 1628. After “considerable public debate,” the church was demolished in 1949 for the Sinclair Oil Building.

Smith designed the "long-since demolished College of Physicians and Surgeons" of Roosevelt Hospital. He continued his work at the hospital and in 1892 designed the Syms Operating Theater in Roosevelt Hospital, now a teaching amphitheater and the oldest part of the evolving hospital. "'The finest structure in the world for surgical operations,' according to Harper's Weekly," Funding was donated by William J. Syms, a retired gun merchant. It prominently features an 1892 glass roof that lights the operating theater with 184 seats. "The mildly Romanesque building was one where 'beauty of exterior has been sacrificed to utility of interior,' according to Harper's Weekly." Constructed of deep red brick, with granite trim, the building has little decoration, but its unusual great, semiconical skylight on top of a small brick box is memorable. The last operation occurred in 1941. It is still freestanding, even as the tower surrounds it and is now a New York City Landmark.

Many of his work was speculative. He designed the building at the southwest corner of Wall and New streets, erected 1899, on land leased from George R. Read for $65,000 annual rent, with original tenants The Equitable Trust Company, Federal Trust Company, and a prominent banking house. The same property had been reported four years earlier in 1895 as being mortgaged by Smith for $1,200,000 from the firm of Kuhn, Loeb, & Co., extending northward from the same corner property, had a frontage of 31 feet on Broadway, Union Trust Company Building, and a depth of over 106 feet to New Street. The frontage on the latter is nearly 59 feet and on Wall Street 39.5 feet. Taken in connection with the southeast corner of Wall Street and Broadway, it makes a compact spot. The corner is owned by the Benjamin D. Silliman (lawyer) estate, and there is supposed to be an understanding between the owners of the two parcels that both will act in unison. It was reported months ago that a large office building would be constructed on the combined plots. The property was reported owned by Smith in 1901 when the Hanover National Bank occupied its basement as its own Hanover National Bank Building headquarters were under construction on Nassau and Pine Streets. The lease negotiated by George R. Read, agent for the property. He held the building until his death and bequeathed it with the Eagle Building on Pearl Street to Columbia University but Columbia's trustees declined the gift and his estate executor's held on to it until 1916 when it went into foreclosure. The property was L-shaped and hugged what became the most expensive per square foot real estate plot in the world, sold in 1905 for $4 a square inch.

As a "contractor for foundation," he designed the 10-story brick and stone lofts at Nos 497 to 501 Park Street, (and Nos 37 to 41 Pearl Street) in 1901 for owner Harry C Hollenbeck of 441 Pearl Street. The foundation was John J Tucker of 37 West 12th Street and the project cost $400,000.

In 1903, Smith began working with John Corley Westervelt and William E Austin on several projects including Childs Restaurants. officially becoming Smith, Westervelt & Austin, architectural firm. This firm would dissolve in 1906 and Westervelt & Austin continued without Smith for two more years.

== Private life ==
He was married to Catherine Hever Brewer (d.Mar 16, 1916). He married his wife in the Dutch Reformed church that he designed. He frequently appeared in the society pages and was a member of several boards and councils, including the Council of New York University.

At the time of his death at age 70, he had no children nor relatives apart from his wife. As a condition of his will, Smith "left a fortune to St. Luke's Hospital." He had a "three-million-dollar estate" through his real estate investments that his wife decided she would not challenge provided she was left with $700 a month instead of $200,000 a year. An additional collection of small bequests to servants and distant relatives did not exceed $20,000. Smith wished the funds to be used to build a sanitarium for poor convalescents. Smith had wanted to design the memorial he would enable but was too ill to do so. Unfortunately St. Luke's was never to receive their bequest.

Four years after Smith's death, the largest tenant at 7 Wall Street, Banker's Trust, vacated their lease to go across the street to a newly built flagship building, taking many of 7 Wall Streets tenants with them. This was the last blow for a property at the crossroads of the financial world once valued at $3,000,000. In 1913, the Equitiable Life Assurance Society began foreclosure proceedings on 7 Wall Street for non-payment of a $300,000 mortgage due in 1910. Upon the death of Catherine H.B.Smith, who fought the foreclosure for 3 years, St. Luke's was unable to claim any of the properties bequeathed to them in Smith's will. The foreclosure suit entangled all of the Smith estate properties and Columbia University, as the owner of St. Luke's, chose not to become involved in a suit that had grown to more than $1,500,000.

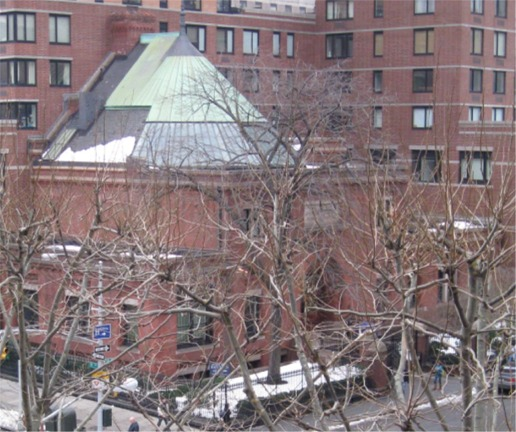
William J. Syms Operating Theater of Charles McBurney (surgeon) at Roosevelt Hospital

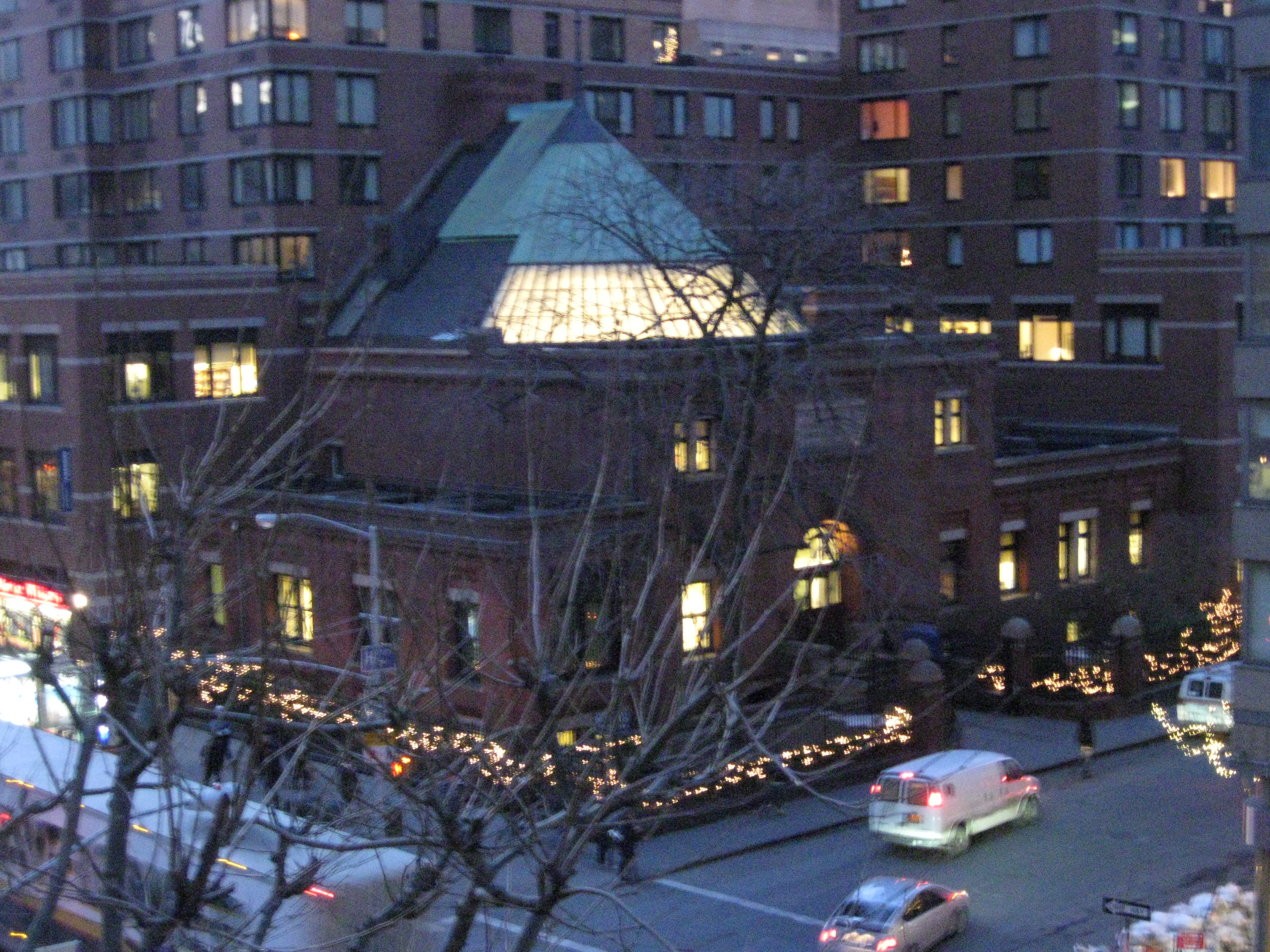
William J. Syms Operating Theater at Roosevelt Hospital showing glass skylight that illuminated operations before incandescent lighting was invented.

== Works ==
- St. Nicholas Collegiate Reformed Protestant Dutch Church (1872, demolished 1949)
- The former Ludwig Brothers Dry Goods Store (1878), 34-42 West 14th Street between Fifth and Sixth Avenues (enlarged 1899 by Louis Korn)
- The Sunday School of the Reformed Church of Greenpoint, now the St. Elias Greek Rite Roman Catholic Church (Brooklyn, New York) (1879).
- The former James J. White Building (1881–1882), now 361 Broadway, southwest corner of Franklin Street
- The College of Physicians and Surgeons of Roosevelt Hospital (1895, demolished)
- William J. Syms Operating Theater (1892) of Roosevelt Hospital, New York City, southwest corner of 59th Street and Ninth Ave.
- Sloane Maternity Hospital of the New-York College of Physicians and Surgeons(1886)
- 7 Wall Street with extension on 84 Broadway, the 12-story building at the southwest corner of Wall and New streets, erected 1899, on land leased from George R. Read for $65,000 annual rent, with original tenants The Equitable Trust Company, Federal Trust Company, and a prominent banking house. Upon Smith's death, he bequeathed this and the Eagle Building on Pearl Street to Columbia University, but the trustees declined the gift and it was held by the United States Trust Company until foreclosure in 1916.
- 497-501 Park Street (1901)
- The Charles T. Yerkes Mansion at the southeast corner of Fifth Avenue and Sixty-eighth Street (originally designed by architect H. S. Cobb). Smith altered and enlarged with a three-story extension built "at the rear and connected with the present dwelling. The cost of the improvement has been estimated by the architect at $75,000."
