= William George Smith =

Scottish psychologist

William George Smith (1866–1918) was an early Scottish psychologist.

== Education ==
Smith studied at George Watson's College, Edinburgh. He then proceeded to the University of Edinburgh from which he graduated with an MA in Philosophy in 1889. He then worked as an assistant to the philosopher Henry Calderwood for two years before proceeding to the University of Leipzig where he worked under Wilhelm Wundt. His doctorate thesis was on "Mediate association of ideas". He then conducted research at European and American institutions including the universities of Strasbourg and Freiburg and Harvard University.

== Career ==
In 1895 he was appointed to faculty at Smith College, Northampton, Massachusetts but returned to Britain in 1901 to take charge of the newly established Department of Experimental Psychology in connection with the Pathological Laboratory of the London County Council Asylum at Claybury. Here he conducted research on association and memory.

He was also appointed Lecturer in Experimental Psychology at King's College London.

In 1903, he became a founding member of the British Psychological Society.

In the same year, he moved to the University of Liverpool as Lecturer-in-Charge of Experimental Psychology, the first full-time appointment in the subject at this University.

In 1906, Smith was appointed the Combe Lectureship in General and Experimental Psychology at the University of Edinburgh. This was the first established post in psychology at the university.His inaugural lecture was entitled ‘The scope of modern psychology’.
