= Billy Smith (footballer, born 1872) =

English footballer

Personal information
- Full name: William Smith
- Date of birth: 1872
- Place of birth: Bilston, England
- Position: Inside forward

Senior career*
Years	Team	Apps	(Gls)
1895–1896	Willenhall		
1896–1899	Wolverhampton Wanderers	58	(19)
1899–1908	Portsmouth		
1908	Gosport United		
Total		58	(19)
- * Club domestic league appearances and goals

William Smith (1872–unknown) was an English footballer who played in the Football League for Wolverhampton Wanderers.
