= Billy Smith (running back) =

American football player

Profile
- Position: Running back

Personal information
- Born: c. 1970; Detroit, Michigan, U.S.
- Listed height: 6 ft 0 in (1.83 m)
- Listed weight: 195 lb (88 kg)

Career information
- High school: Henry Ford (Detroit, MI)
- College: Central Michigan (1988–1991)

Billy Smith (born c. 1970) is a former American football running back for the Central Michigan Chippewas from 1988 to 1992. Smith began his career at Michigan Stte as a defensive back before converting to fullback and then to tailback. He had consecutive 1000-yard rushing seasons with 1,047 yards in 1990 and 1,440 yards in 1991. He ranked fifth in the country among major-college players in rushing yards for the 1991 season. On September 15, 1991, he led Central Michigan to an upset victory over Michigan State with 162 rushing yards and two touchdowns on 40 carries. He completed his college career with 2,772 rushing yards, 266 receiving yards, 191 kickoff return yards, and 10 touchdowns. Smith was inducted into the Central Michigan Athletics Hall of Fame in 2008.
