= Elias Willard Smith =

American architect

- Born: 1814 or 1816; Albany, New York
- Died: 1886; Washington, DC
- Education: Rensselaer Polytechnic Institute
- Occupation: Architect
- Buildings: Daniel S. Schanck Observatory

Elias Willard Smith (1814/1816–1886) was an American architect and civil engineer. He was born in 1814 or 1816 (sources differ) in Albany, New York, and died in 1886 in Washington, DC. He was educated as an engineer, at the Rensselaer Polytechnic Institute. As a graduation present from his father, he undertook a trip from St. Louis to the Rocky Mountains and back (1839–1840). During this trip, he recorded his observations in a journal, which was handed down in his family and later published in various scholarly venues.

After returning from the Rocky Mountains expedition and until the Civil War, Smith practiced engineering, having some connection with the water works in Detroit and Chicago. While living in Detroit, Smith practiced architecture, and notably Dankmar Adler studied with him before 1861. After the Civil War, he moved to Virginia, first to Williamsburg and then to Georgetown. During this period he performed some work for the Washington Gas Works.

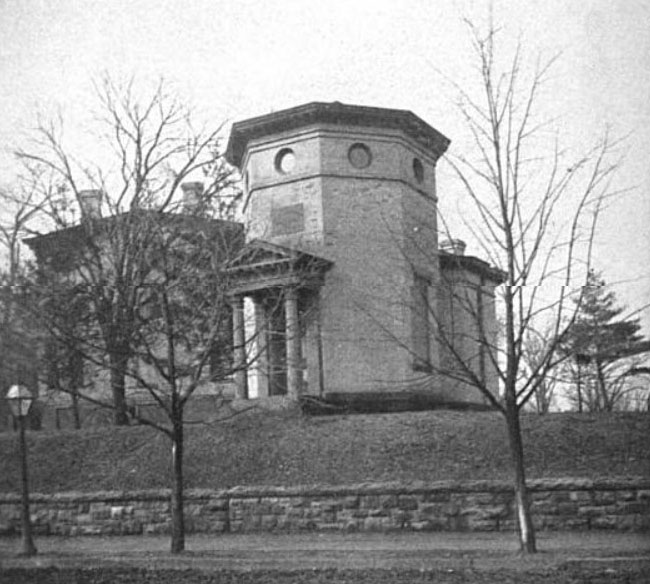
Daniel S Schanck Observatory

In 1865, Smith designed the Daniel S. Schanck Observatory for Rutgers College (now Rutgers University).
