= William Duncan Smith =

Former United States Army Officer and Confederate General

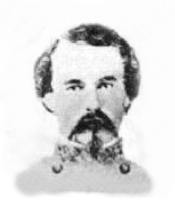
- William Duncan Smith
- Born: July 28, 1825; Augusta, Georgia
- Died: October 4, 1862 (aged 37); Charleston, South Carolina
- Burial place: City Cemetery, Augusta
- Military career
- Allegiance: United States of America; Confederate States of America
- Service years: 1842–1861 (USA); 1861–1862 (CSA)
- Rank: Captain (USA); Brigadier General (CSA)
- Conflicts: Mexican–American War; American Civil War: Battle of Secessionville

William Duncan Smith (July 28, 1825 – October 4, 1862) was a career United States Army officer who fought in the Mexican–American War. Later he served as a Confederate general during the American Civil War, and he died in the second year of the war from yellow fever.

== Early life and career ==
Smith was born in Augusta, Georgia, in 1825. He entered the United States Military Academy in West Point in July 1842, and graduated four years later, standing 35th out of 59 cadets. He was appointed a brevet second lieutenant in the 2nd U.S. Dragoons, and was promoted to second lieutenant on August 18, 1847.

Smith served during the Mexican-American War, and was wounded in the Battle of Molino del Rey on September 8, 1847, one of the conflict's bloodiest engagements. After the war with Mexico ended he was promoted to first lieutenant on August 18, 1851. His final promotion in the U.S. Army came on June 4, 1858, to the rank of captain. He was in Europe on a leave of absence from the Army from 1859 to 1861.

== Civil War service and death ==
Choosing to follow his home state and the Confederate cause, Smith resigned his U.S. commission on January 28, 1861. He entered service in the Confederate States Army on March 16 as a captain in the cavalry, but transferred to the infantry that same day, also with a promotion to major. Shortly afterward he was assigned to the 1st Georgia Regular Infantry Regiment.

Smith was made the Assistant Adjutant General of the Defenses of Savannah, Georgia on June 25. He was promoted to colonel on July 14 and given command of the 20th Georgia Infantry. On March 7, 1862 he was confirmed a brigadier general and assigned to the 1st Brigade of the Confederate District of Georgia in the Department of South Carolina & Georgia from April 30 to July 8. During this period he led one of the wings of Brig. Gen. "Shanks" Evans's army that won the Battle of James Island (Battle of Secessionville). He was then given command of the First Subdistrict of the District of South Carolina (same department) until his death on October 4.

Smith died of yellow fever on duty in Charleston, South Carolina. His body has brought back to his home town, and he was buried in Augusta's City Cemetery.

== See also ==
- List of American Civil War generals (Confederate)
