= William F. Smith (American football) =

American football player and coach

Biographical details
- Born: April 7, 1888; Gurnee, Pennsylvania, U.S.

Playing career
- 1904: Mansfield
- 1906–1907: Indiana Normal

Coaching career (HC unless noted)
- 1908–1917: Indiana Normal (assistant)
- 1914–1918: Indiana Normal
- 1923–1926: Punxsutawney Area HS (PA)

William Francis Smith (born April 7, 1888) was an American college football player and coach. He served as the head coach at Indiana University of Pennsylvania from 1914 to 1918.
