= William D. Smith (admiral) =

United States admiral (1933–2020)

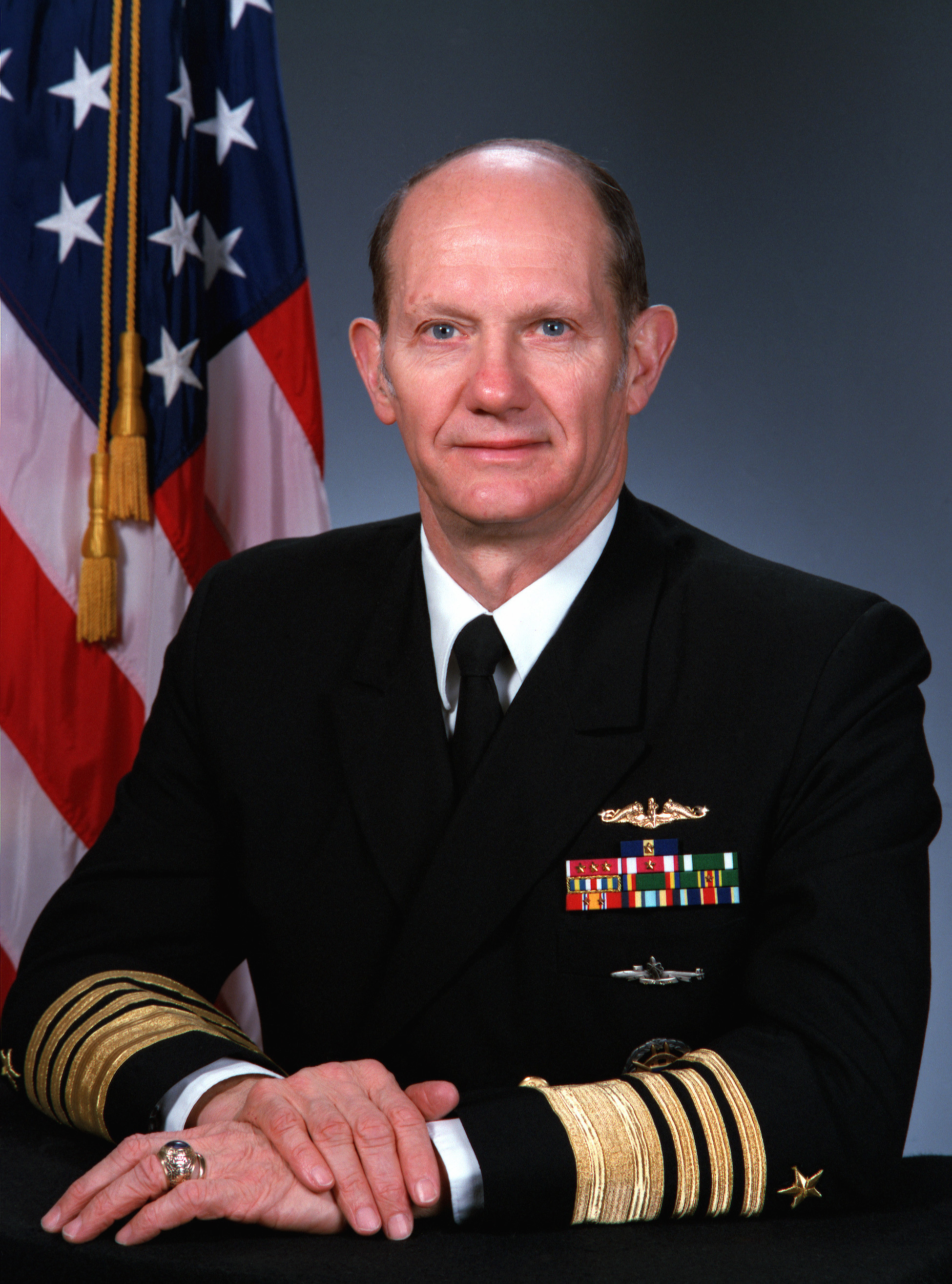
- Admiral William D. Smith
- Born: February 9, 1933; Denver, Colorado, US
- Died: September 9, 2020 (aged 87)
- Military career
- Allegiance: United States of America
- Branch: United States Navy
- Service years: 1955–1993
- Rank: Admiral

William Dee Smith (February 9, 1933 – September 9, 2020) was a United States Navy four star admiral who served as United States Military Representative, NATO Military Committee (USMILREP) between 1991 & 1993. Smith retired in 1993 and died in 2020.
