= Willie W. Smith =

American physiologist

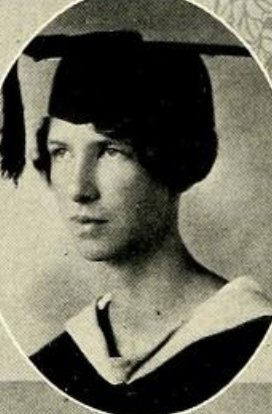
- Willie White Smith, from the 1927 yearbook of Agnes Scott College
- Born: Willie White Smith; 1907
- Died: August 29, 1989 (aged 81–82)
- Education: Agnes Scott College, Columbia University
- Scientific career
- Fields: Physiology, radiobiology
- Workplaces: National Institutes of Health
- Thesis: Contracture in the Gastrocnemius of the Frog (1938)
- Doctoral advisor: Frank H. Pike

Willie White Smith (1907 – August 29, 1989) was an American physiologist specialized in radiobiology. She researched the effects of radiation on bone marrow and the production of white blood cells at the National Institutes of Health.

== Education ==
Smith was born in 1907, in Thomson, Georgia. She had 4 brothers and 3 sisters. She graduated from Agnes Scott College in 1927. She earned a Ph.D. from Columbia University in 1938. Her dissertation was titled Contracture in the Gastrocnemius of the Frog. Frank H. Pike was Smith's doctoral advisor and electrophysiologist Horatio Burt Williams provided departmental support.

== Career and research ==
Smith began her career at NIH in 1943, in a laboratory that eventually became a part of the National Institute of Arthritis and Metabolic Diseases. Her first research projects concerned the acute toxicity of DDT, soon to be used by American troops in Italy and North Africa, and of methyl chloride—a substitute refrigerant and ingredient in synthetic rubber. Later, Smith guided a young radiologist through some experimental work, after which she began her radiobiology studies of the effects of radiation. The young radiologist— Robert Q. Marston—went on to become the Director of NIH from 1968 to 1973. In those early days of investigating the damaging effects of radiation, Smith studied the influence of environmental factors (altitude, temperature, hypoxia, exercise), endocrine factors and dietary factors on the effects of radiation and recovery from sublethal doses. She went on to study the role of infection in death from radiation, and the effects of antibiotics and the body's own cellular defenses in countering radiation. In the early 1950's she was invited to witness an atomic bomb test in Nevada and examine the blast area. The test was set up to simulate an A-bomb explosion in a residential area. In 1953 Smith and her colleagues were transferred to the laboratory of biophysics (later to become the laboratory of physiology) in the National Cancer Institute (NCI) where she continued her studies of the effects of radiation on bone marrow and the production of white blood cells.

Smith published in numerous journals, reviewed manuscripts for Radiation Research, JNCI, and Science, and served on numerous professional committees. She retired in 1977.

== Personal life ==
In 1941, Smith lived in Wilmington, Delaware. She was an avid gardener. In keeping with this hobby, she was presented with a hybrid rhododendron upon her retirement. In the latter part of her life, White lived in Baltimore and Chevy Chase. She died of pneumonia on August 29, 1989.

== Selected works ==
- Smith, Willie W.; Finkelstein, Norma; Smith, Homer W. (August 1940). "Renal Excretion of Hexitols (sorbitol, Mannitol, and Dulcitol) and Their Derivatives (sorbitan, Isomannide, and Sorbide) and of Endogenous Creatinine-Like Chromogen in Dog and Man". Journal of Biological Chemistry. 135 (1): 231–250. doi:10.1016/S0021-9258(18)73180-3. ISSN 0021-9258.
- Smith, Willie W.; Alderman, Ilo M.; Gillespie, Ruth E. (September 1957). "Increased Survival in Irradiated Animals Treated With Bacterial Endotoxins". American Journal of Physiology. Legacy Content. 191 (1): 124–130. doi:10.1152/ajplegacy.1957.191.1.124. ISSN 0002-9513. PMID 13478698.
- Smith, Willie W.; Alderman, Ilo M.; Gillespie, Ruth E. (February 1958). "Hematopoietic Recovery Induced by Bacterial Endotoxin in Irradiated Mice". American Journal of Physiology. Legacy Content. 192 (3): 549–556. doi:10.1152/ajplegacy.1958.192.3.549. ISSN 0002-9513. PMID 13520954.
- Mechanic, Richard C.; Frei, Emil; Landy, Maurice; Smith, Willie W. (January 1962). "Quantitative Studies of Human Leukocytic and Febrile Response to Single and Repeated Doses of Purified Bacterial Endotoxin" (PDF). The Journal of Clinical Investigation. 41 (1): 162–172. doi:10.1172/JCI104459. ISSN 0021-9738. PMC 289206. PMID 14471951.
