= John A. Bradley =

American general

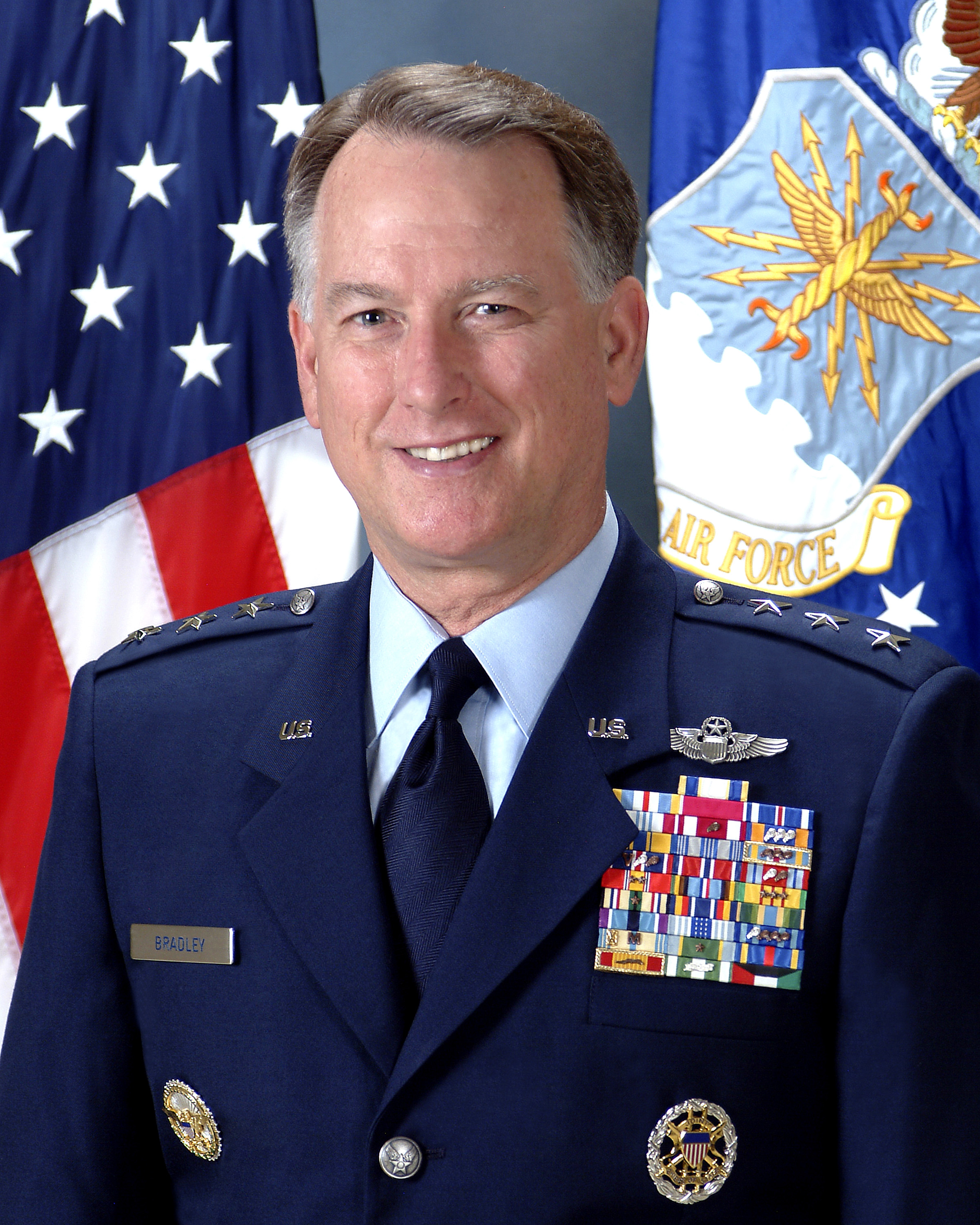
- Born: c. 1945 (age 80–81); Lebanon, Tennessee, U.S.
- Military career
- Allegiance: United States of America
- Branch: United States Air Force
- Service years: 1967–2008
- Rank: Lieutenant General

John A. Bradley (born c. 1945) was a lieutenant general in the United States Air Force who served as Commander of the United States Air Force Reserve Command, Headquarters U.S. Air Force, Washington D.C., and commander, Headquarters Air Force Reserve, a separate operating agency located at Robins Air Force Base, Georgia. As chief of Air Force Reserve, he served as the principal adviser on Reserve matters to the Air Force Chief of Staff. As commander of AFRES, he had full responsibility for the supervision of U.S. Air Force Reserve units around the world.

== Personal ==
In the 2024 United States presidential election, Bradley endorsed Kamala Harris.
