= Will Smith (footballer, born 2005) =

English footballer (born 2005)

Personal information
- Full name: William Thomas Smith
- Date of birth: 30 November 2005 (age 20)
- Place of birth: Stoke-on-Trent, England
- Position: Midfielder

Youth career
- 2022–2024: Stoke City

Senior career*
Years	Team	Apps	(Gls)
2024–2026	Stoke City	0	(0)
2026	→ Mickleover (loan)		
- * Club domestic league appearances and goals as of 16:53, 17 August 2024 (UTC)

William Thomas Smith (born 30 November 2005) is an English professional footballer who plays as a midfielder.

== Club career ==
Smith began his career with Stoke City progressing through the club's academy, making his professional debut on 27 August 2024 in a 5–0 EFL Cup victory away at Middlesbrough. Smith made a further two appearances in the EFL Cup in 2025–26. On 12 March 2026, Smith joined Northern Premier League Division One Midlands side Mickleover on a one-month loan. Smith left Stoke at the end of the 2025–26 season after not having his contract renewed. Smith joined Nantwich Town on 8 September 2026.

== Career statistics ==
As of match played 26 August 2025

Appearances and goals by club, season and competition
Club	Season	League			FA Cup		EFL Cup		Other		Total	
Club	Season	Division	Apps	Goals	Apps	Goals	Apps	Goals	Apps	Goals	Apps	Goals
Stoke City	2024–25	Championship	0	0	0	0	1	0	—		1	0
Stoke City	2025–26	Championship	0	0	0	0	2	0	—		2	0
Career total			0	0	0	0	3	0	0	0	3	0
