= Will Smith (footballer, born 1998) =

English footballer (born 1998)

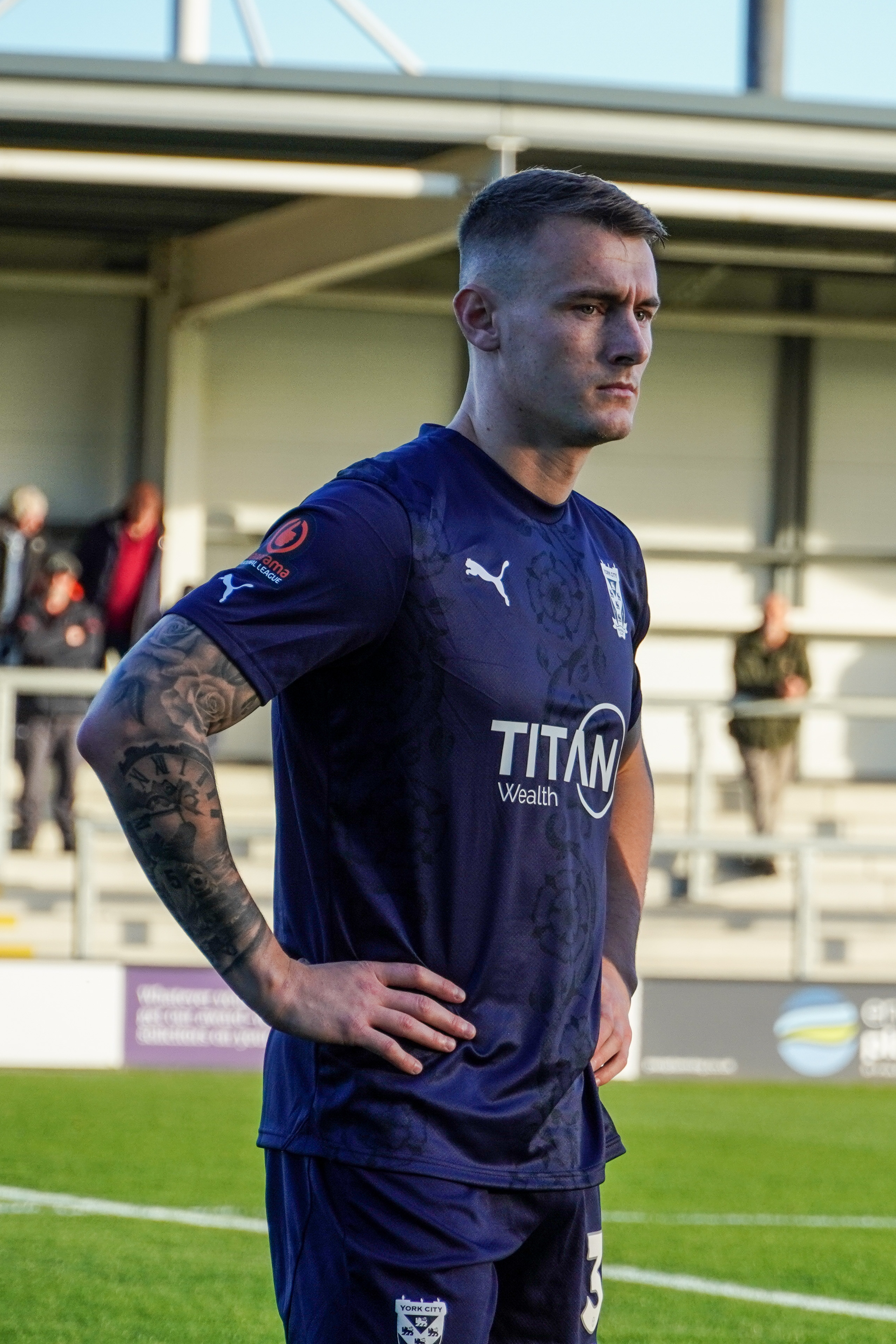
- Smith in 2023

Personal information
- Full name: William Owen Smith
- Date of birth: 4 November 1998 (age 27)
- Place of birth: Leeds, England
- Height: 6 ft 0 in (1.84 m)
- Position: Defender

Team information
- Current team: Morecambe
- Number: 5

Youth career
- Barnsley

Senior career*
Years	Team	Apps	(Gls)
2018–2019	Barnsley	0	(0)
2018–2019	→ Darlington (loan)	14	(1)
2019–2024	Harrogate Town	85	(5)
2023	→ Scunthorpe United (loan)	13	(3)
2023–2024	→ York City (loan)	27	(1)
2024–2026	FC Halifax Town	56	(5)
2026–	Morecambe	9	(1)
- * Club domestic league appearances and goals as of 07:54, 13 September 2026 (UTC)

William Owen Smith (born 4 November 1998) is an English professional footballer who plays as a defender for National League North club Morecambe.

Smith made his senior debut for Barnsley in the EFL Trophy in 2018, and spent time on loan at National League North club Darlington in 2018–19. He joined Harrogate Town in 2019, and helped them win the 2019–20 FA Trophy and gain promotion to the Football League for the first time in the club's history. He played regularly, injury permitting, during his first three seasons with Harrogate, and then spent time on loan to Scunthorpe United in 2022–23 and York City in 2023–24. Released by Harrogate in 2024, he signed for FC Halifax Town.

== Career ==
Smith was born in Leeds, West Yorkshire. He took up a scholarship with Barnsley in 2015, and was named Academy Player of the Year for the 2015–16 season. He turned professional in May 2017, and signed a new one-year contract in July 2018. Smith made his senior debut for Barnsley on 13 November 2018 in the EFL Trophy.

In December, Smith and Barnsley team-mate Romal Palmer joined National League North club Darlington on a 28-day youth loan. Smith played the whole of all six of Darlington's matches during the initial loan, which was then extended to the end of the season.

He was offered a new contract by Barnsley at the end of the 2018–19 season, but chose instead to leave the club and sign for Harrogate Town of the National League. According to Harrogate manager Simon Weaver, Smith showed at Darlington that he could cope with the physicality of men's football: "He's brave. He's a proper defender. He doesn't mind putting his head in there where it hurts and he knows how to defend his six-yard box. He's a big strong boy, but at the same time, he possesses that quality that the modern breed of centre-half has to have in his locker and can play football."

Smith started 36 of a possible 37 league matches as Harrogate finished second in a 2019–20 National League season truncated by the COVID-19 pandemic. In the play-offs, his header led to Jack Muldoon's goal by which Harrogate beat Boreham Wood in the play-off semi-final, and in the final, despite "not [having] a straightforward afternoon up against the imposing physical presence of Kyle Wootton", he helped his team beat Notts County 3–1 and gain promotion into the Football League for the first time in their history. Smith was also on the winning side in that season's FA Trophy, whose final was not played until May 2021.

He remained a regular starter in League Two, was reportedly "in the form of his life", and scored his first Football League goal on 31 October, but in the next match, he fell awkwardly after an aerial challenge and was taken to hospital with his neck in a brace. He suffered mild whiplash, but was out for nearly three months with torn tendons at the top of a hamstring. He returned to his regular spot in the starting eleven and helped his team retain their Football League status, but suffered a dead leg in 2021 pre-season and lost his place to the experienced new signing Rory McArdle. He played throughout October before undergoing surgery on a double hernia and did not return to the starting eleven until mid-February 2022.

On 17 February 2023, Smith returned to the National League when he joined Scunthorpe United on an initial one-month loan. Having scored three goals in six matches, the loan was extended until the end of the season, during which time he played in a further seven matches without scoring. He played once more for Harrogate – in an 8–0 EFL Cup defeat at home to Blackburn Rovers – before joining National League club York City on 25 September 2023 on a month's loan, which was extended for a further month in October. In January 2024, his loan was extended until the end of the season.

He was released by Harrogate at the end of the 2023–24 season, and signed for National League club FC Halifax Town.

In June 2026, Smith joined Morecambe on a two-year deal following their relegation to the National League North.

== Career statistics ==
As of match played 22 February 2025

Appearances and goals by club, season and competition
Club	Season	League			FA Cup		League Cup		Other		Total	
Club	Season	Division	Apps	Goals	Apps	Goals	Apps	Goals	Apps	Goals	Apps	Goals
Barnsley	2018–19	League One	0	0	0	0	0	0	1 (Note: Appearance(s) in EFL Trophy)	0	1	0
Darlington (loan)	2018–19	National League North	14	1	—		—		—		14	1
Harrogate Town	2019–20	National League	36	2	2	0	—		8 (Note: Two appearances in National League play-offs, six appearances and one goal in the FA Trophy. Because of the COVID-19 pandemic, the semi-finals and final of the 2019–20 FA Trophy were not played until the 2020–21 season.)	1	46	3
Harrogate Town	2020–21	League Two	32	2	0	0	2	0	1	0	35	2
Harrogate Town	2021–22	League Two	17	1	0	0	0	0	4	0	21	1
Harrogate Town	2022–23	League Two	0	0	0	0	0	0	0	0	0	0
Harrogate Town	2023–24	League Two	0	0	0	0	1	0	0	0	1	0
Harrogate Town	Total		85	5	2	0	3	0	13	1	103	6
Scunthorpe United (loan)	2022–23	National League	13	3	—		—		—		13	3
York City (loan)	2023–24	National League	27	1	4	0	—		—		31	1
FC Halifax Town	2024–25	National League	33	1	1	0	—		2 (Note: Appearances in National League Cup)	0	36	1
Career total			172	11	7	0	3	0	16	1	196	12

== Honours ==
Harrogate Town

- National League play-offs: 2020
- FA Trophy: 2019–20
