= William W. Smith (Arkansas judge) =

Arkansas Supreme Court justice (1838–1888)

William W. Smith (1838 – December 18, 1888) was a justice of the Arkansas Supreme Court from 1882 until his death in 1888.

He was born near Cokesbury, South Carolina. He graduated from the South Carolina College in 1859, and in 1860 moved to Arkansas and settled in Monroe County, just prior to the start of the American Civil War. He traveled to Richmond and joined Colonel Gregg's first regiment of South Carolina volunteers.

After his term of enlistment he joined the 23rd Arkansas Infantry Regiment under command of Colonel C. W. Adams, with Simon P. Hughes as lieutenant-colonel. He went in as orderly sergeant and soon became captain of his company. He was captured at Port Hudson.

When the war ended Smith returned to Clarendon, Arkansas. In 1867 he formed a law firm in partnership with Col. Hughes. The partnership continued until Hughes was elected Arkansas Attorney General in 1874.

In 1877, Smith moved to Helena, Arkansas and worked at law until 1882 when he received the Democratic Party nomination for associate justice of the Arkansas Supreme Court. He succeeded William M. Harrison upon election in September of that year to serve a term of eight years. Since that time his residence continued in Helena, as the discharge of his duties required him to be there.

He died in Little Rock of consumption (tuberculosis) at age 50.

Political offices
Preceded by William M. Harrison	Justice of the Arkansas Supreme Court; 1882–1888	Succeeded by Monte H. Sandels
