= William Charles Smith =

English musicologist

William Charles Smith (22 July 1881 – 20 November 1972) was an English musicologist who specialized in musical bibliographies. His particular area of interest was 17th and 18th century musical figures that were active in England. Considered an authority on the life and works of George Frideric Handel, he notably published several books on the famous composer. Smith also had a large private collection of Handel works, some of them original manuscripts. He was also interested in chronicling the work of English music engravers and publishers of the period.

Smith was born in London. From 1900 to 1944 he was on staff of the British Museum, serving as Assistant Keeper of Printed Books from 1920 – 1944. He died in Bromley in 1972 at the age of 91.

== Sources ==
- https://www.oxfordmusiconline.com/grovemusic/view/10.1093/gmo/9781561592630.001.0001/omo-9781561592630-e-0000026021
- New General Catalog of Old Books and Authors
- Sadie, S. (ed.) (1980) The New Grove Dictionary of Music & Musicians, [vol. # 17].
- William Charles Smith

== Selection ==
- A Bibliography of the Musical Works Published by John Walsh during the Years 1695–1720. London 1948 und 1968.
- Concerning Handel: his Life and Works. London 1948.
- Mit Charles Humphries: Music Publishing in the British Isles. London 1954 und 1970.
- The Italian Opera and Contemporary Ballet in London, 1789–1820. London 1955.
- Handel: a Descriptive Catalogue of the Early Editions. London 1960 und 1970.
- A Handelian's Notebook. London 1965.
- Mit Charles Humphries: A Bibliography of the Musical Works Published by the Firm of John Walsh during the Years 1721–1766. London 1968.
