= Archdeacon of Killaloe =

Province of Dublin
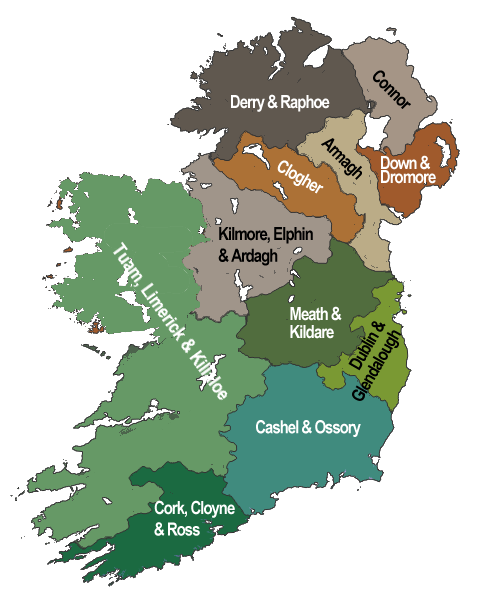
- Church: Church of Ireland
- Metropolitan bishop: Archbishop of Dublin
- Cathedral: Christ Church Cathedral, Dublin
- Dioceses: 5

The Archdeacon of Killaloe was a senior ecclesiastical officer within the Diocese of Killaloe until 1752; and then within the Diocese of Killaloe and Kilfenora until 1832 when it became the Diocese of Killaloe and Clonfert. As such he was responsible for the disciplinary supervision of the clergy within the diocese.

The archdeaconry can trace its history from Donat O'Kennedy, the first known incumbent, who became Bishop of Killaloe in 1231 to the last discrete holder William Augustine Blood Smyth who retired in 1938.
