= 2024–25 Stoke City F.C. season =

2024-25 season of Stoke City FC

Stoke City
2024–25 season
- Chairman: John Coates
- Manager: Steven Schumacher (until 16 September); Ryan Shawcross (interim) (until 18 September); Narcís Pèlach (from 18 September until 27 December); Ryan Shawcross (interim); Mark Robins (from 1 January)
- Stadium: bet365 Stadium
- Championship: 18th
- FA Cup: Fourth round
- EFL Cup: Fourth round
- Top goalscorer: League: Tom Cannon (9); All: Tom Cannon (10)
- Highest home attendance: 29,163 v Sheffield Wednesday (18 April 2025)
- Lowest home attendance: 19,679 v Bristol City (22 October 2024)
- Average home league attendance: 22,804
Home colours	Away colours	Third colours

The 2024–25 season was Stoke City's 108th season in the Football League, and the 48th in the second tier.

After keeping Stoke up the previous season Steven Schumacher was given the summer to improve his squad for the 2024–25 campaign, however after only five matches he was surprisingly sacked and replaced by inexperienced Spanish coach Narcís Pèlach. This proved to be a poor decision as he only won three of his 19 matches in charge leading to his dismissal in December. Former Coventry City manager Mark Robins took over and he was able to keep Stoke up on the final day finishing two points above the relegation zone in 18th position.

== Pre-season ==
The day after the end of the 2023–24 season Stoke announced that Tyrese Campbell, Ciaran Clark and Wesley would be leaving following the end of their contracts whilst Jordan Thompson had his extended by one-year. Stoke's first signing of the summer was Swedish goalkeeper Viktor Johansson on a three-year deal from Rotherham United. Head of recruitment Jared Dublin left the club in May 2024 and was replaced the following month by [ee Darnbrough from Hull City. Defender Ben Gibson was the second player to arrive, joining on a free after leaving Norwich City. French full-back Eric Bocat joined on 26 June 2024 from Belgian side Sint-Truiden. Forward Sam Gallagher joined from Blackburn Rovers on 31 July 2024. in early August it was announced that John Coates had become outright owner of the club following demerger implemented by bet365.

Stoke played friendlies against AZ Alkmaar, Bolton Wanderers, Chester, Cork City, Crewe Alexandra and Stockport County.

11 July 2024 Friendly	Chester	0–3	Stoke City	Chester
19:45 BST		Report	Tezgel 13', 45'; Ennis 85'	Stadium: Deva Stadium

17 July 2024 Friendly	Cork City	0–5	Stoke City	Cork, Ireland
19:45 BST		Report	Burger 23'; Bae Jun-ho 25', 29'; Sidibe 74'; Johnson 80'	Stadium: Turners Cross

23 July 2024 Friendly	Crewe Alexandra	1–2	Stoke City	Crewe
19:30 BST	Sanders 2'	Report	Vidigal 62', 87'	Stadium: Gresty Road

27 July 2024 Friendly	Stockport County	1–0	Stoke City	Stockport
14:00 BST	Wootton 31'	Report		Stadium: Edgeley Park

30 July 2024 Friendly	Bolton Wanderers	0–1	Stoke City	Bolton
19:30 BST		Report	Manhoef 34'	Stadium: Toughsheet Community Stadium

3 August 2024 Friendly	Stoke City	0–1	AZ Alkmaar	Stoke-on-Trent
15:00 BST		Report	Parrott 48'	Stadium: bet365 Stadium

== Championship ==
=== August ===
Stoke began their 2024–25 campaign at home against Coventry City, Lewis Baker scoring the only goal with ten minutes remaining. A second half collapse the following week saw Stoke lose 3–0 at Watford with a brace from Edo Kayembe. For the visit of Midlands rivals West Bromwich Albion Schumacher gave a first league start for Liverpool loanee Lewis Koumas. The Baggies scored early through Karlan Grant before Koumas, equalised for his first league goal in professional football. However straight from the kick-off West Brom regained the lead via Josh Maja and they went on to see out the win. On transfer deadline day leaving the club were midfielders Lewis Baker, Daniel Johnson and Josh Laurent whilst joining the team was Japanese defensive midfielder Tatsuki Seko and forward Tom Cannon. Stoke ended August with a 1–0 win at Plymouth Argyle, Million Manhoef scoring past Conor Hazard.

=== September ===
Following the international break Stoke put in a poor performance away at newly promoted Oxford United losing 1–0, Idris El Mizouni scoring just after half time. Head coach Steven Schumacher was sacked two days later along with his coaching staff. Stoke moved quickly to bring in Spanish coach Narcís Pèlach from Norwich City for his first head coach role. His first game ended in a 3–1 defeat against Hull City with the Tigers scoring three second half goals after Wilmot had given Stoke the lead. City were outplayed by Middlesbrough a week later, losing 2–0 with Boro having 26 shots on Stoke's goal.

=== October ===
Stoke earned their first win under Pèlach in emphatic fashion, beating newly promoted Portsmouth 6–1 with Tom Cannon, scoring four goals becoming the first Stoke player to do so since Peter Thorne in March 2000. Gallagher and Moran also scored their first goals for the club. The team then played out a goalless draw away at Swansea City. After the second international break, Stoke took on promotion contenders Norwich City, Ante Crnac gave the Canaries the lead before a curling effort from Manhoef earned Stoke a point. Three days later Stoke hosted Bristol City and despite making a strong start, going 2–0 up from Koumas and Moran the Robins controlled the match and ended up having 28 shots on Johansson's goal with a brace from Nahki Wells bringing them level. Stoke ended October with a 2–0 defeat at promotion favourites Sheffield United.

=== November ===
Derby County made the short journey across the A50 and conceded an early penalty after Jacob Widell Zetterström brought down Tom Cannon, who converted from the spot. Stoke gifted the Rams an equaliser following a mix up between Gibson and Johansson before Gibson made amends heading in a late corner. Stoke then travelled to Blackburn, coming away with a 2–0 victory with goals from Manhoef and another penalty from Cannon. City then drew 1–1 with in-form Millwall after Gibson cancelled out Josh Coburn's opener. Following the final international break of the year Stoke drew 1–1 with Queens Park Rangers at Loftus Road with Žan Celar missing a penalty. Stoke then played out a drab goalless draw with Preston North End who had goalkeeper Freddie Woodman sent off late on for handling outside his area. Stoke ended November with a 2–0 defeat against promotion contenders Burnley.

=== December ===
Stoke took early leads against Sunderland and Luton Town but went on to lose 2–1 with late goals pilling the pressure on head coach Narcís Pèlach. Stoke again took an early lead at home to Cardiff City through Moran but the Bluebirds equalised via Anwar El Ghazi. Ben Gibson scored an own goal before he headed in a last minute free kick to salvage a 2–2 draw. Stoke then put in an awful performance away at Sheffield Wednesday. In an uneventful first half the Owls had defender Di'Shon Bernard sent off for two bookable offences. Despite playing against ten men for the second half Stoke went on to lose 2–0 with Cannon missing a penalty. Stoke were outplayed by Leeds United on boxing day, losing 2–0. Pèlach was sacked by Stoke on 27 December 2024 after only winning three out of his nineteen games in charge. Ryan Shawcross took caretaker charge of the final game of 2024 against Sunderland, Tom Cannon scoring in the 92nd minute to end Stoke's nine game winless run.

=== January ===
On New Year's Day, Stoke appointed Mark Robins on a three-and-a-half year contract, with Paul Nevin and James Rowberry as his assistants. Stoke later, drew 0–0 with promotion chasing Burnley who had Hannibal Mejbri sent off late on for treading on Tchamadeu. Robins' first game in charge was against bottom of the table, Plymouth Argyle which ended in a frustrating goalless draw. Stoke suffered a setback when Leicester decided to recall Tom Cannon and so Nathan Lowe was recalled from a productive spell at Walsall. Lowe was sent straight into the starting line-up away at West Bromwich Albion and he scored inside the opening ten minutes, Grady Diangana brought Albion level after and Stoke held on for a 1–1 draw. Left-back Josh Wilson-Esbrand was brought in on loan from Manchester City and went into the team to face Portsmouth at Fratton Park. He gave away a penalty after five minutes and Stoke never recovered going on to lose 3–1. Stoke's final match of January saw them play out another drab goalless home draw this time against Oxford United.

=== February ===
Striker Ali Al-Hamadi joined on loan from Ipswich Town until the end of the season. He scored on his debut helping Stoke to a 2–1 comeback win over Hull City. Following their FA Cup exit Stoke put in another poor away performance, going down 2–0 at Bristol City with Anis Mehmeti scoring both goals. Stoke then came from behind to beat Swansea City 3–1 with Lewis Baker, lobbing Swans goalkeeper Lawrence Vigouroux from his own half. The team failed to build on his though losing to Norwich City and Middlesbrough.

=== March ===
March began with another goalless home draw this time against Watford. Robins returned to his old club Coventry on 8 March, Stoke making a poor start going 2–0 down after 30 minutes. They improved greatly in the second half and a brace from Sam Gallagher looked to have earned a draw but a last minute strike from Bobby Thomas condemned Stoke to a 3–2 defeat. Four days later Stoke were able to grind out a narrow win over Blackburn Rovers with Ali Al-Hamadi scoring the only goal of the game. A turgid game against Millwall looked to be heading for a goalless draw before the Lions were scored a controversial penalty in the final minute. Following the international break, Stoke entered the final eight fixtures just one place above the relegation zone. Stoke claimed a vital 3–1 victory against Queens Park Rangers on 29 March.

=== April ===
Stoke were unable to pull away from the bottom as they could only draw 1–1 at Preston North End and at home to relegation rivals Luton Town, with Stoke again conceding in stoppage-time. Stoke then picked up a vital 1–0 win over Cardiff City with Will Fish conceding a late own goal. On Good Friday against Sheffield Wednesday, Stoke recorded their highest attendance for a Championship fixture at the bet365 Stadium, with 29,163 tickets sold. the team were able to gain a 2–0 victory thanks to a tap in from Manhoef and a bizarre error by Wednesday keeper Pierce Charles who booted an attempted clearance straight at Ben Wilmot. On Easter Monday, Stoke were well beaten by Premier League bound Leeds United and then by 3rd place Sheffield United four days later to leave them going into the final day of the season two points above the relegation zone.

=== May ===
Stoke played out a goalless draw with fellow relegation rivals Derby County on the final day, a result which was enough for both sides to remain in the Championship for the 2025–26 season.

=== Matches ===
10 August 2024 1	Stoke City	1–0	Coventry City	Stoke-on-Trent
12:30 BST	Baker 78'	Report		Stadium: bet365 Stadium; Attendance: 25,037

17 August 2024 2	Watford	3–0	Stoke City	Watford
15:00 BST	Kayembe 47', 73'; Andrews 49'	Report		Stadium: Vicarage Road; Attendance: 18,789

24 August 2024 3	Stoke City	1–2	West Bromwich Albion	Stoke-on-Trent
15:00 BST	Koumas 29'	Report	Grant 18'; Maja 31'	Stadium: bet365 Stadium; Attendance: 24,371

31 August 2024 4	Plymouth Argyle	0–1	Stoke City	Plymouth
15:00 BST		Report	Manhoef 83'	Stadium: Home Park; Attendance: 16,934

14 September 2024 5	Oxford United	1–0	Stoke City	Oxford
12:30 BST	El Mizouni 48'	Report		Stadium: Kassam Stadium; Attendance: 11,507

20 September 2024 6	Stoke City	1–3	Hull City	Stoke-on-Trent
20:00 BST	Wilmot 30'	Report	Palmer 63'; Slater 77'; Wilmot 79' (o.g.)	Stadium: bet365 Stadium; Attendance: 23,366; Referee: Ben Toner

28 September 2024 7	Middlesbrough	2–0	Stoke City	Middlesbrough
15:00 BST	Doak 34'; Hackney 73'	Report		Stadium: Riverside Stadium; Attendance: 24,610

2 October 2024 8	Stoke City	6–1	Portsmouth	Stoke-on-Trent
19:45 BST	Cannon 13', 43', 48' (pen.), 51'; Gallagher 45+1'; Moran 53'	Report	O'Mahony 29'	Stadium: bet365 Stadium; Attendance: 20,824; Referee: Tom Nield

5 October 2024 9	Swansea City	0–0	Stoke City	Swansea
15:00 BST		Report		Stadium: Swansea.com Stadium; Attendance: 14,546

19 October 2024 10	Stoke City	1–1	Norwich City	Stoke-on-Trent
15:00 BST	Manhoef 45+6'	Report	Crnac 45'	Stadium: bet365 Stadium; Attendance: 23,002

22 October 2024 11	Stoke City	2–2	Bristol City	Stoke-on-Trent
19:45 BST	Koumas 2'; Moran 14'	Report	Wells 50', 52'	Stadium: bet365 Stadium; Attendance: 19,679

26 October 2024 12	Sheffield United	2–0	Stoke City	Sheffield
15:00 BST	Moore 14'; Campbell 50'	Report		Stadium: Bramall Lane; Attendance: 28,575

2 November 2024 13	Stoke City	2–1	Derby County	Stoke-on-Trent
12:30 GMT	Cannon 9' (pen.); Gibson 82'	Report	Johansson 68' (o.g.)	Stadium: bet365 Stadium; Attendance: 24,511

6 November 2024 14	Blackburn Rovers	0–2	Stoke City	Blackburn
19:45 GMT		Report	Manhoef 57'; Cannon 85' (pen.)	Stadium: Ewood Park; Attendance: 13,144

9 November 2024 15	Stoke City	1–1	Millwall	Stoke-on-Trent
12:30 GMT	Gibson 60'	Report	Coburn 42'	Stadium: bet365 Stadium; Attendance: 21,060

23 November 2024 16	Queens Park Rangers	1–1	Stoke City	Shepherd's Bush, London
15:00 GMT	Gibson 68' (o.g.)	Report	Cannon 24'	Stadium: Loftus Road; Attendance: 15,688

26 November 2024 17	Stoke City	0–0	Preston North End	Stoke-on-Trent
19:45 GMT		Report		Stadium: bet365 Stadium; Attendance: 19,805

30 November 2024 18	Stoke City	0–2	Burnley	Stoke-on-Trent
15:00 GMT		Report	Rodriguez 52'; Brownhill 78' (pen.)	Stadium: bet365 Stadium; Attendance: 22,994

7 December 2024 19	Sunderland	2–1	Stoke City	Sunderland
12:30 GMT	Watson 7', 86'	Report	Koumas 6'	Stadium: Stadium of Light; Attendance: 35,300

10 December 2024 20	Luton Town	2–1	Stoke City	Luton
19:45 GMT	Morris 24'; Adebayo 90'	Report	Cannon 6'	Stadium: Kenilworth Road; Attendance: 10,537

14 December 2024 21	Stoke City	2–2	Cardiff City	Stoke-on-Trent
15:00 GMT	Moran 17'; Gibson 90+5'	Report	El Ghazi 32'; Gibson 68' (o.g.)	Stadium: bet365 Stadium; Attendance: 20,847

21 December 2024 22	Sheffield Wednesday	2–0	Stoke City	Sheffield
12:30 GMT	Windass 52'; Paterson 76'	Report		Stadium: Hillsborough; Attendance: 26.743

26 December 2024 23	Stoke City	0–2	Leeds United	Stoke-on-Trent
20:00 GMT		Report	Piroe 42', 63'	Stadium: bet365 Stadium; Attendance: 24,738

29 December 2024 24	Stoke City	1–0	Sunderland	Stoke-on-Trent
15:00 GMT	Cannon 90+2'	Report		Stadium: bet365 Stadium; Attendance: 23,654

1 January 2025 25	Burnley	0–0	Stoke City	Burnley
15:00 GMT		Report		Stadium: Turf Moor; Attendance: 20,119

4 January 2025 26	Stoke City	0–0	Plymouth Argyle	Stoke-on-Trent
12:30 GMT		Report		Stadium: bet365 Stadium; Attendance: 26,168

18 January 2025 27	West Bromwich Albion	1–1	Stoke City	West Bromwich
15:00 GMT	Diangana 71'	Report	Lowe 9'	Stadium: The Hawthorns; Attendance: 25,695

22 January 2025 28	Portsmouth	3–1	Stoke City	Portsmouth
19:45 GMT	Bishop 5' (pen.); Lang 9'; Ogilvie 49'	Report	Wilmot 27'	Stadium: Fratton Park; Attendance: 19,388

25 January 2025 29	Stoke City	0–0	Oxford United	Stoke-on-Trent
12:30 GMT		Report		Stadium: bet365 Stadium; Attendance: 22,911

1 February 2025 30	Hull City	1–2	Stoke City	Kingston upon Hull
15:00 GMT	Matazo 6'	Report	Al-Hamadi 43'; Moran 74'	Stadium: MKM Stadium; Attendance: 21,709

12 February 2025 31	Bristol City	2–0	Stoke City	Bristol
19:45 GMT	Mehmeti 11', 73'	Report		Stadium: Ashton Gate; Attendance: 18,457

15 February 2025 32	Stoke City	3–1	Swansea City	Stoke-on-Trent
15:00 GMT	Burger 64'; Bae Jun-ho 73'; Baker 90+3'	Report	Tymon 61'	Stadium: bet365 Stadium; Attendance: 21,256

22 February 2025 33	Norwich City	4–2	Stoke City	Norwich
15:00 GMT	Dobbin 32'; Sargent 48', 71'; Tchamadeu 78' (o.g.)	Report	Baker 45+2', 90+7' (pen.)	Stadium: Carrow Road; Attendance: 26,267

25 February 2025 34	Stoke City	1–3	Middlesbrough	Stoke-on-Trent
19:45 GMT	Bae Jun-ho 45'	Report	Forss 20'; Azaz 52'; Conway 73'	Stadium: bet365 Stadium; Attendance: 20,141

1 March 2025 35	Stoke City	0–0	Watford	Stoke-on-Trent
15:00 GMT		Report		Stadium: bet365 Stadium; Attendance: 21,894

8 March 2025 36	Coventry City	3–2	Stoke City	Coventry
12:30 GMT	Torp 22', 31'; Thomas 90+7'	Report	Gallagher 65', 86'	Stadium: Coventry Building Society Arena; Attendance: 30,011

12 March 2025 37	Stoke City	1–0	Blackburn Rovers	Stoke-on-Trent
20:00 GMT	Al-Hamadi 19'	Report		Stadium: bet365 Stadium; Attendance: 20,194

15 March 2025 38	Millwall	1–0	Stoke City	Bermondsey, London
12:30 GMT	Ivanović 90+4' (pen.)	Report		Stadium: The Den; Attendance: 16,799

29 March 2025 39	Stoke City	3–1	Queens Park Rangers	Stoke-on-Trent
15:00 GMT	Bae Jun-ho 21'; Tchamadeu 44'; Manhoef 54'	Report	Yang Min-hyeok 78'	Stadium: bet365 Stadium; Attendance: 23,192

5 April 2025 40	Preston North End	1–1	Stoke City	Preston
15:00 BST	Kesler-Hayden 11'	Report	Baker 75' (pen.)	Stadium: Deepdale; Attendance: 17,341

8 April 2025 41	Stoke City	1–1	Luton Town	Stoke-on-Trent
19:45 BST	Baker 74'	Report	Alli 90+1'	Stadium: bet365 Stadium; Attendance: 21,226

12 April 2025 42	Cardiff City	0–1	Stoke City	Cardiff
15:00 BST		Report	Fish 85' (o.g.)	Stadium: Cardiff City Stadium; Attendance: 20,658

18 April 2025 43	Stoke City	2–0	Sheffield Wednesday	Stoke-on-Trent
15:00 BST	Manhoef 21'; Wilmot 61'	Report		Stadium: bet365 Stadium; Attendance: 29,163

21 April 2025 44	Leeds United	6–0	Stoke City	Leeds
15:00 BST	Piroe 2', 8', 20', 41'; Firpo 26'; Gnonto 59'	Report		Stadium: Elland Road; Attendance: 36,644

25 April 2025 45	Stoke City	0–2	Sheffield United	Stoke-on-Trent
20:00 BST		Report	McCallum 38'; Brooks 87'	Stadium: bet365 Stadium; Attendance: 24,460; Referee: Jarred Gillett

3 May 2025 46	Derby County	0–0	Stoke City	Derby
12:30 BST		Report		Stadium: Pride Park; Attendance: 32,471

=== League table ===
Pos	Team	Pld	W	D	L	GF	GA	GD	Pts
16	Portsmouth	46	14	12	20	58	71	−13	54
17	Oxford United	46	13	14	19	49	65	−16	53
18	Stoke City	46	12	15	19	45	62	−17	51
19	Derby County	46	13	11	22	48	56	−8	50
20	Preston North End	46	10	20	16	48	59	−11	50

Source: English Football League
Rules for classification: 1) Points; 2) Goal difference; 3) Number of goals scored; 4) Head-to-head results; 5) Wins; 6) Away goals; 7) Penalty points (sec 9.5); 8) Number of 12-point sending off offences; 9) Play-off (only if needed to determine promotion/relegation)

== FA Cup ==
Stoke City entered the FA Cup in the third round, and were drawn away to Sunderland. Stoke progressed 2–1 with an extra time goal from Niall Ennis. In the fourth round against Cardiff City, Stoke made a comeback from 2–0 down to lead 3–2 before Cardiff equalised and sent the game into a penalty shoot out which the Bluebirds progressed 4–2.

11 January 2025 Third round	Sunderland	1–2 (a.e.t.)	Stoke City	Sunderland
15:00 GMT	Aleksić 64'	Report	Cannon 4' (pen.); Ennis 112'	Stadium: Stadium of Light; Attendance: 15,774; Referee: Elliot Bell

8 February 2025 Fourth round	Stoke City	3–3 (a.e.t.) (2–4 p)	Cardiff City	Stoke-on-Trent
15:00 GMT	Koumas 42', 46'; Baker 57' (pen.)	Report	Colwill 8', 68'; Salech 19'	Stadium: bet365 Stadium; Attendance: 12,641; Referee: Thomas Kirk
	Penalties
	Tezgel (penalty scored); Seko (penalty missed); Rose (penalty missed); Burger (penalty scored)		(penalty scored) Ralls; (penalty missed) Salech; (penalty scored) Chambers; (penalty scored) Willock; (penalty scored) Colwill

== EFL Cup ==
Stoke were drawn away against League Two side Carlisle United in the first round, academy graduates Freddie Anderson and Emre Tezgel each scored their first professional goals for the club in a 2–0 victory. In the second round, Stoke faced Championship rivals Middlesbrough at the Riverside Stadium. Stoke fielded their youngest ever team with an average age of under 21 and they put in a clinical performance winning 5–0 with goals from Tezgel, Koumas, Mmaee and a brace from Manhoef. Ryan Shawcross took caretaker charge of the third round tie against Fleetwood Town, managed by Charlie Adam. A late goal from Rhys Bennett sent the tie to penalties after Michael Rose had given Stoke the lead. Johansson saved two Fleetwood pens as Stoke progressed 2–1. Stoke were knocked out of the EFL Cup by Southampton in the fourth round, losing 3–2.

13 August 2024 First Round	Carlisle United	0–2	Stoke City	Carlisle
19:30 BST		Report	Anderson 48'; Tezgel 79'	Stadium: Brunton Park; Attendance: 4,441

27 August 2024 Second Round	Middlesbrough	0–5	Stoke City	Middlesbrough
19:15 BST		Report	Tezgel 14'; Mmaee 57'; Koumas 60'; Manhoef 65', 69'	Stadium: Riverside Stadium; Attendance: 17,408

17 September 2024 Third Round	Stoke City	1–1 (2–1 p)	Fleetwood Town	Stoke-on-Trent
19:30 BST	Rose 54'	Report	Bennett 90+1'	Stadium: bet365 Stadium; Attendance: 8,927
	Penalties
	Cannon (penalty missed); Tezgel (penalty scored); Sidibe (penalty scored); Burger (penalty missed)		Patterson (penalty missed); Graydon (penalty missed); Odubeko (penalty missed); Bonds (penalty scored); Broom (penalty missed)

29 October 2024 Fourth Round	Southampton	3–2	Stoke City	Southampton
19:45 GMT	Harwood-Bellis 19'; Armstrong 35' (pen.); Bree 88'	Report	Phillips 45'; Cannon 54'	Stadium: St Mary's; Attendance: 16,092; Referee: Lewis Smith

== Squad statistics ==
As of match played 3 May 2025

No.	Pos.	Name	Championship		FA Cup		EFL Cup		Total		Discipline	
No.	Pos.	Name	Apps	Goals	Apps	Goals	Apps	Goals	Apps	Goals	Yellow card	Red card
1	GK	(Sweden) Viktor Johansson	46	0	1	0	2	0	49	0	5	0
2	DF	(United States) Lynden Gooch	12(8)	0	0(1)	0	0(2)	0	12(11)	0	3	0
3	DF	(Republic of Ireland) Enda Stevens	13(5)	0	1(1)	0	1	0	15(6)	0	2	0
4	MF	(England) Ben Pearson	8(5)	0	0(1)	0	0	0	8(6)	0	5	0
5	DF	(Scotland) Michael Rose	13(9)	0	1	0	2	1	16(9)	1	3	0
6	MF	(Netherlands) Wouter Burger	37(2)	1	2	0	2(2)	0	41(4)	1	11	0
7	MF	(Angola) André Vidigal	0(10)	0	1	0	1	0	2(10)	0	0	0
8	MF	(England) Lewis Baker	16(3)	6	2	1	1	0	19(3)	7	3	0
9	FW	(Republic of Ireland) Tom Cannon	22	9	1	1	1(1)	1	24(1)	11	3	0
9	FW	(Iraq) Ali Al-Hamadi	11(4)	2	0	0	0	0	11(4)	2	2	0
10	MF	(South Korea) Bae Jun-ho	37(8)	3	1(1)	0	1(1)	0	39(10)	3	6	0
11	FW	(Wales) Lewis Koumas	26(17)	3	2	2	3(1)	1	31(18)	6	5	0
12	MF	(Jamaica) Daniel Johnson	0(1)	0	0	0	1	0	1(1)	0	1	0
12	MF	(Japan) Tatsuki Seko	18(7)	0	1(1)	0	1	0	20(8)	0	0	0
13	GK	(Republic of Ireland) Jack Bonham	0	0	1	0	1	0	2	0	0	0
14	FW	(England) Niall Ennis	1(8)	0	0(1)	1	1(1)	0	2(10)	1	0	0
15	MF	(Northern Ireland) Jordan Thompson	13(10)	0	0	0	2(1)	0	15(11)	0	7	0
16	DF	(England) Ben Wilmot	36(3)	3	1	0	1(1)	0	38(4)	3	9	0
17	DF	(France) Eric Bocat	23(7)	0	0	0	2(2)	0	25(9)	0	1	0
18	MF	(Republic of Ireland) Bosun Lawal	1(6)	0	0(1)	0	0	0	1(7)	0	0	0
19	FW	(Morocco) Ryan Mmaee	1(2)	0	0	0	1	1	2(2)	1	0	0
20	FW	(England) Sam Gallagher	9(13)	3	0	0	0	0	9(13)	3	4	0
22	DF	(Cameroon) Junior Tchamadeu	35(6)	1	2	0	2	0	39(6)	1	12	0
23	DF	(England) Ben Gibson	22(2)	3	1	0	0	0	23(2)	3	7	0
24	MF	(Republic of Ireland) Andrew Moran	26(9)	4	1	0	2(1)	0	29(10)	4	10	0
26	DF	(England) Ashley Phillips	35	0	1	0	3	1	39	1	6	0
28	MF	(England) Josh Laurent	3	0	0	0	0(1)	0	3(1)	0	3	0
30	MF	(England) Sol Sidibe	3(5)	0	0(1)	0	4	0	7(6)	0	0	0
33	DF	(England) Josh Wilson-Esbrand	4(2)	0	1	0	0	0	5(2)	0	0	0
34	GK	(England) Frank Fielding	0	0	0	0	1	0	1	0	0	0
35	FW	(England) Nathan Lowe	5(5)	1	0	0	0	0	5(5)	1	1	0
37	FW	(England) Emre Tezgel	2(10)	0	1(1)	0	1(2)	2	4(13)	2	1	0
41	DF	(England) Jaden Dixon	0(2)	0	0	0	4	0	4(2)	0	0	0
42	FW	(Netherlands) Million Manhoef	28(6)	5	0	0	2(2)	2	30(8)	7	2	0
43	DF	(United States) Freddie Anderson	0	0	0	0	1	1	1	1	0	0
46	MF	(England) Will Smith	0	0	0	0	0(1)	0	0(1)	0	0	0
50	MF	(Republic of Ireland) Darius Lipsiuc	0	0	0	0	0(1)	0	0(1)	0	0	0
56	MF	(England) Favour Fawunmi	0	0	0(1)	0	0	0	0(1)	0	0	0
Own goals			—	1	—	0	—	0	—	1	—	

== Transfers ==
=== In ===
Date	Pos.	Name	From	Fee	Ref.
18 May 2024 (Note: The transfer was announced on 18 May, and would become official on 14 June once the transfer window re-opens)	GK	(Sweden) Viktor Johansson	(England) Rotherham United	Undisclosed	
8 June 2024 (Note: The transfer was announced on 8 June, and would become official on 1 July once his Norwich City contract expired)	DF	(England) Ben Gibson	(England) Norwich City	Free	
26 June 2024	DF	(France) Eric Bocat	(Belgium) Sint-Truiden	Undisclosed	
5 July 2024	MF	(England) Chinonso Chibueze (Note: Signed initially for the Under-21s)	(England) Chelsea	Free	
5 July 2024	GK	(England) Noah Cooper	(England) Arsenal	Free	
5 July 2024	DF	(Ghana) Francis Gyimah	(England) Liverpool	Free	
5 July 2024	MF	(Scotland) Kieron Willox	(Scotland) Rangers	Free	
26 July 2024	MF	(Poland) Wiktor Gromek	(Italy) Lecce	Undisclosed	
26 July 2024	FW	(Wales) Japhet Matondo	(Wales) Cardiff City	Undisclosed	
31 July 2024	FW	(England) Sam Gallagher	(England) Blackburn Rovers	Undisclosed	
12 August 2024	MF	(Republic of Ireland) Bosun Lawal	(Scotland) Celtic	Undisclosed	
30 August 2024	MF	(Japan) Tatsuki Seko	(Japan) Kawasaki Frontale	Undisclosed	
3 February 2024	MF	(England) Ruben Curley	(England) Manchester United	Undisclosed	
5 February 2025	FW	(England) Adriel Walker	(England) West Bromwich Albion	Free	
7 February 2025	FW	(England) Favour Fawunmi	(England) West Ham United	Free	

=== Out ===
Date	Pos.	Name	To	Fee	Ref.
30 June 2024	FW	(England) Tyrese Campbell	(England) Sheffield United	Released	
30 June 2024	DF	(Republic of Ireland) Ciaran Clark	Unattached	Released	
30 June 2024	DF	(England) Tom Curl	Unattached	Released	
30 June 2024	DF	(England) Tom Edwards	(England) Salford City	Released	
30 June 2024	DF	(England) Ian Kamga	(England) Watford	Released	
30 June 2024	MF	(England) Ben Kershaw	(England) Hyde United	Released	
30 June 2024	GK	(Cameroon) Blondy Nna Noukeu	(England) Sunderland	Released	
30 June 2024	FW	(England) Kahrel Reddin	(England) Altrincham	Released	
30 June 2024	MF	(England) Sonny Singh	Unattached	Released	
30 June 2024	MF	(Wales) Tom Sparrow	(Scotland) Motherwell	Released	
30 June 2024	FW	(Brazil) Wesley	(Turkey) Fatih Karagümrük	Released	
30 June 2024	FW	(England) D'Margio Wright-Phillips	(Belgium) Beerschot	Released	
1 July 2024	DF	(Wales) Matt Baker	(Wales) Newport County	Compensation	
4 July 2024	DF	(Republic of Ireland) David Okagbue	(England) Walsall	Compensation	
1 August 2024	DF	(Scotland) Liam McCarron	(England) Northampton Town	Undisclosed	
13 August 2024	MF	(Algeria) Mehdi Léris	(Italy) Pisa	Undisclosed	
29 August 2024	MF	(Jamaica) Daniel Johnson	(Turkey) Fatih Karagümrük	Contract terminated	
29 August 2024	MF	(Iraq) Ali Hayder	(England) Macclesfield	Free	
30 August 2024	MF	(England) Josh Laurent	(England) Burnley	Undisclosed	
27 January 2025	FW	(Republic of Ireland) Dara McGuinness	(Republic of Ireland) Finn Harps	Free	

=== Loans in ===
Date from	Pos.	Name	From	Date to	Ref.
10 August 2024	FW	(Wales) Lewis Koumas	(England) Liverpool	30 June 2025	
16 August 2024	MF	(Republic of Ireland) Andrew Moran	(England) Brighton & Hove Albion	30 June 2025	
23 August 2024	DF	(England) Ashley Phillips	(England) Tottenham Hotspur	30 June 2025	
30 August 2024	FW	(Republic of Ireland) Tom Cannon	(England) Leicester City	15 January 2025 (Note: On 15 January, Cannon was recalled back to his parent club Leicester City and sold to Sheffield United)	
22 January 2025	DF	(England) Josh Wilson-Esbrand	(England) Manchester City	30 June 2025	
24 January 2025	FW	(Iraq) Ali Al-Hamadi	(England) Ipswich Town	30 June 2025	

=== Loans out ===
Date from	Pos.	Name	To	On loan until	Ref.
2 July 2024	GK	(England) Tommy Simkin	(England) Walsall	End of Season	
22 August 2024	FW	(England) Nathan Lowe	(England) Walsall	12 January 2025 (Note: On 12 January, Lowe was recalled back from his loan at Walsall)	
23 August 2024	DF	(Jamaica) Luke Badley-Morgan	(Scotland) Airdrieonians	End of Season	
29 August 2024	MF	(England) Lewis Baker	(England) Blackburn Rovers	8 January 2025 (Note: On 8 January, Baker was recalled back from his loan at Blackburn)	
4 September 2024	FW	(Morocco) Ryan Mmaee	(Austria) Rapid Wien	3 February 2025 (Note: On 3 February, Mmaee's loan with Rapid Wien was terminated by mutual consent)	
6 September 2024	MF	(Serbia) Nikola Jojić	(Serbia) Mladost Lučani	17 February 2025 (Note: On 17 February, Jojić was recalled back from his season-long loan at Mladost Lučani and subsequently joined Gorica on loan)	
10 September 2024	FW	(Republic of Ireland) Dara McGuinness	(England) Leek Town	4 January 2025	
4 October 2024	FW	(New Zealand) Adam Watson	(England) Hanley Town	8 December 2024	
8 November 2024	FW	(England) Keke Jeffers	(England) Torquay United	2 January 2025	
9 December 2024	FW	(New Zealand) Adam Watson	(England) Witton Albion	6 January 2025	
7 December 2024	DF	(Republic of Ireland) Jake Griffin	(England) Brackley Town	14 January 2025	
17 December 2024	DF	(Republic of Ireland) Christy Grogan	(England) Wythenshawe Town	14 January 2025	
17 January 2025	FW	(England) Dean Adekoya	(England) Runcorn Linnets	15 February 2025	
23 January 2025	DF	(United States) Freddie Anderson	(Republic of Ireland) Cork City	1 November 2025	
30 January 2025	FW	(England) Niall Ennis	(England) Blackpool	30 June 2025	
3 February 2025	MF	(Republic of Ireland) Darius Lipsiuc	(England) Walsall	30 June 2025	
17 February 2025	FW	(Serbia) Nikola Jojić	(Croatia) Gorica	30 June 2025	
1 March 2025	FW	(England) Josh Maskall	(England) Mickleover	29 March 2025	
5 March 2025	FW	(England) Keke Jeffers	(England) Ashton United	30 June 2025	
