= 2024–25 EFL Championship =

21st season of EFL Championship

EFL Championship
- Season: 2024–25
- Dates: 9 August 2024 – 3 May 2025
- Champions: Leeds United; 2nd Championship title 5th 2nd tier title
- Promoted: Leeds United; Burnley; Sunderland
- Relegated: Luton Town; Plymouth Argyle; Cardiff City
- Matches: 552
- Goals: 1,353 (2.45 per match)
- Top goalscorer: Joël Piroe (Leeds United) (19 goals)
- Best goalkeeper: James Trafford (Burnley) (29 clean sheets)
- Biggest home win: Leeds United; 7–0 Cardiff City (1 February 2025)
- Biggest away win: Plymouth Argyle; 0–5 Burnley (22 January 2025); Queens Park Rangers; 0–5 Burnley (26 April 2025)
- Highest scoring: Sheffield Wednesday; 2–6 Watford (2 November 2024); Oxford United; 2–6 Middlesbrough (23 November 2024); Norwich City; 3–5 Portsmouth (18 April 2025); West Bromwich Albion; 5–3 Luton Town (3 May 2025)
- Longest winning run: Blackburn Rovers; Leeds United (6 games)
- Longest unbeaten run: Burnley (33 games)
- Longest winless run: Plymouth Argyle (15 games)
- Longest losing run: Derby County (7 games)
- Highest attendance: 46,530; Sunderland 1–1 (a.e.t.); Coventry City (Play-off semi-final 2nd leg) (13 May 2025)
- Lowest attendance: 10,213; Oxford United 1–0; Hull City (5 November 2024)
- Total attendance: 12,169,962
- Average attendance: 22,047

The 2024–25 EFL Championship (referred to as the Sky Bet Championship for sponsorship reasons) was the 9th season of the EFL Championship under its current title and the 33rd season under its current league division format.

== Team changes ==
The following teams have changed division since the 2023–24 season:

=== To Championship ===
Promoted from League One

- Portsmouth
- Derby County
- Oxford United

Relegated from the Premier League

- Luton Town
- Burnley
- Sheffield United

=== From Championship ===
Promoted to the Premier League

- Leicester City
- Ipswich Town
- Southampton

Relegated to League One

- Birmingham City
- Huddersfield Town
- Rotherham United

== Stadiums and locations ==
Locations of the 2024–25 EFL Championship teams

Team	Location	Stadium	Capacity
Blackburn Rovers	Blackburn	Ewood Park	31,000
Bristol City	Bristol	Ashton Gate	27,000
Burnley	Burnley	Turf Moor	21,944
Cardiff City	Cardiff	Cardiff City Stadium	33,280
Coventry City	Coventry	Coventry Building Society Arena	32,609
Derby County	Derby	Pride Park Stadium	32,956
Hull City	Kingston upon Hull	MKM Stadium	25,586
Leeds United	Leeds	Elland Road	37,608
Luton Town	Luton	Kenilworth Road	12,056
Middlesbrough	Middlesbrough	Riverside Stadium	34,742
Millwall	London (Bermondsey)	The Den	20,146
Norwich City	Norwich	Carrow Road	27,359
Oxford United	Oxford	Kassam Stadium	12,500
Plymouth Argyle	Plymouth	Home Park	17,900
Portsmouth	Portsmouth	Fratton Park	20,899
Preston North End	Preston	Deepdale	23,408
Queens Park Rangers	London (Shepherd's Bush)	Loftus Road	18,439
Sheffield United	Sheffield (Highfield)	Bramall Lane	32,050
Sheffield Wednesday	Sheffield (Hillsborough)	Hillsborough Stadium	39,732
Stoke City	Stoke-on-Trent	bet365 Stadium	30,089
Sunderland	Sunderland	Stadium of Light	49,000
Swansea City	Swansea	Swansea.com Stadium	21,088
Watford	Watford	Vicarage Road	22,200
West Bromwich Albion	West Bromwich	The Hawthorns	26,850

== Personnel and sponsoring ==
Team	Manager	Captain	Kit manufacturer	Shirt sponsor (chest)	Shirt sponsor (back)	Shirt sponsor (sleeve)	Shorts sponsor
Blackburn Rovers	(France) Valérien Ismaël	(England) Lewis Travis	Macron	Watson Ramsbottom Solicitors	Multevo	Venky's	Venky's
Bristol City	(England) Liam Manning	(Republic of Ireland) Jason Knight	O'Neills	Robins Foundation^{1}	GoSkippy	Watches of Bath	DNRG
Burnley	(England) Scott Parker	(England) Josh Brownhill	Castore	96.com	Bristol Street Motors	None	Rapidz
Cardiff City	(Wales) Aaron Ramsey (interim)	(England) Joe Ralls	New Balance	Visit Malaysia	Quinnbet	Watches of Bath	None
Coventry City	(England) Frank Lampard	(England) Ben Sheaf	Hummel	Monzo	King of Shaves	Mercury xRM	G&R Scaffolding
Derby County	(England) John Eustace	(Guatemala) Nathaniel Mendez-Laing	Puma	FanHub	HSG UK	Tonic Weight Loss Surgery	HSG UK
Hull City	(Spain) Rubén Sellés	(England) Lewie Coyle	Kappa	Corendon Airlines	Safiport	Anex Tour	Sportsbet.io
Leeds United	(Germany) Daniel Farke	(Wales) Ethan Ampadu	Adidas	Red Bull	AMT Auto	BOXT Life	None
Luton Town	(England) Matt Bloomfield	(Wales) Tom Lockyer	Umbro	Utilita	Toureen Group (H)/Ryebridge (A)	Star Platforms (H)Switchshop (A)	None
Middlesbrough	(England) Michael Carrick	(England) Jonny Howson	Erreà	Unibet	Host & Stay	BOXT Life	BOXT Life
Millwall	(Scotland) Alex Neil	(England) Shaun Hutchinson	Erreà	MyGuava	Wiggett Group	None	None
Norwich City	(England) Jack Wilshere (interim)	(Scotland) Kenny McLean	Joma	Blakely Clothing	Sekura.id	Gran Canaria	3B Data Security
Oxford United	(England) Gary Rowett	(England) Elliott Moore	Macron	Baxi	Polythene UK	Caprinos Pizza	Rocktree Group
Plymouth Argyle	(Austria) Miron Muslić	(England) Joe Edwards	Puma	Classic Builders	Project 35	Vertu Motors	Retain Limited
Portsmouth	(England) John Mousinho	(England) Marlon Pack	Nike	University of Portsmouth	TotalAV	BeeBu	Richmond Motor Group
Preston North End	(England) Paul Heckingbottom	(England) Benjamin Whiteman	Castore	PAR Group	None	PAR Group	None
Queens Park Rangers	(Spain) Martí Cifuentes	(England) Steve Cook	Erreà	CopyBet	Xtra Maintenance	MyGuava	None
Sheffield United	(England) Chris Wilder	(England) Jack Robinson	Erreà	Maneki	CarMats	Dr. Cinik	None
Sheffield Wednesday	(Germany) Danny Röhl	(Scotland) Barry Bannan	Macron	Mockba Modular	Mr Vegas Casino	None	None
Stoke City	(England) Mark Robins	(England) Ben Gibson	Macron	bet365	Stoke City Community Trust	None	None
Sunderland	(France) Régis Le Bris	(England) Dan Neil	Hummel	Spreadex Sports	Valhalla.game	Seriös Group	None
Swansea City	(Republic of Ireland) Alan Sheehan	(Wales) Ben Cabango	Joma	Reviva Coffee (H); Westacres (A)	Swansea Building Society	Visit Central Florida	First Grade Projects
Watford	(England) Tom Cleverley	(Austria) Daniel Bachmann	Kelme	MrQ.com	Koka	University of Hertfordshire	Asus
West Bromwich Albion	(Scotland) James Morrison (interim)	(England) Jed Wallace	Macron	Ideal Heating	Mega Riches Casino	BarberBoss	None

1. Bristol City's shirt sponsor was Huboo until 13 February 2025 when the deal was ended prematurely.

== Managerial changes ==
Team	Outgoing manager	Manner of departure	Date of vacancy	Position in the table	Incoming manager	Date of appointment
Plymouth Argyle	(England) Neil Dewsnip	End of interim spell	4 May 2024	Pre-season	(England) Wayne Rooney	25 May 2024
Sunderland	(England) Mike Dodds	End of interim spell	4 May 2024	Pre-season	(France) Régis Le Bris	22 June 2024
Hull City	(England) Liam Rosenior	Sacked	7 May 2024	Pre-season	(Germany) Tim Walter	31 May 2024
Norwich City	(United States) David Wagner	Sacked	17 May 2024	Pre-season	(Denmark) Johannes Hoff Thorup	30 May 2024
Burnley	(Belgium) Vincent Kompany	Signed by Bayern Munich	29 May 2024	Pre-season	(England) Scott Parker	5 July 2024
Preston North End	(England) Ryan Lowe	Mutual consent	12 August 2024	23rd	(England) Paul Heckingbottom	20 August 2024
Stoke City	(England) Steven Schumacher	Sacked	16 September 2024	13th	(Spain) Narcís Pèlach	18 September 2024
Cardiff City	(Turkey) Erol Bulut	Sacked	22 September 2024	24th	(Turkey) Omer Riza (Note: Riza was officially appointed as manager until the end of the season on 5 December 2024, but on 19 April 2025 was sacked.)	23 September 2024
Coventry City	(England) Mark Robins	Sacked	7 November 2024	17th	(England) Frank Lampard	28 November 2024
Hull City	(Germany) Tim Walter	Sacked	27 November 2024	22nd	(Spain) Rubén Sellés	6 December 2024
Millwall	(England) Neil Harris	Mutual consent	14 December 2024	13th	(Scotland) Alex Neil	30 December 2024
Oxford United	(England) Des Buckingham	Sacked	15 December 2024	20th	(England) Gary Rowett	20 December 2024
West Bromwich Albion	(Spain) Carlos Corberán	Signed by Valencia	24 December 2024	7th	(England) Tony Mowbray	17 January 2025
Stoke City	(Spain) Narcís Pèlach	Sacked	27 December 2024	19th	(England) Mark Robins	1 January 2025
Plymouth Argyle	(England) Wayne Rooney	Mutual consent	31 December 2024	24th	(Austria) Miron Muslić	10 January 2025
Luton Town	(Wales) Rob Edwards	Mutual consent	9 January 2025	20th	(England) Matt Bloomfield	14 January 2025
Derby County	(England) Paul Warne	Sacked	7 February 2025	22nd	(England) John Eustace	13 February 2025
Blackburn Rovers	(England) John Eustace	Signed by Derby County	13 February 2025	5th	(France) Valérien Ismaël	25 February 2025
Swansea City	(England) Luke Williams	Sacked	17 February 2025	17th	(Republic of Ireland) Alan Sheehan (Note: Sheehan was officially appointed as manager until the end of the season on 26 March 2025, and was then appointed permanently on 30 April 2025.)	18 February 2025
Cardiff City	(Turkey) Omer Riza	Sacked	19 April 2025	23rd	(Wales) Aaron Ramsey (interim)	19 April 2025
West Bromwich Albion	(England) Tony Mowbray	Sacked	21 April 2025	10th	(Scotland) James Morrison (interim)	21 April 2025
Norwich City	(Denmark) Johannes Hoff Thorup	Sacked	22 April 2025	14th	(England) Jack Wilshere (interim)	22 April 2025

== League table ==
Pos	Team	Pld	W	D	L	GF	GA	GD	Pts	Promotion, qualification or relegation
1	Leeds United (C, P)	46	29	13	4	95	30	+65	100	Promotion to the Premier League
2	Burnley (P)	46	28	16	2	69	16	+53	100	Promotion to the Premier League
3	Sheffield United	46	28	8	10	63	36	+27	90 (Note: Sheffield United were deducted two points for defaulting on payments to other clubs during the 2022–23 and 2023–24 seasons, with a further two points suspended.)	Qualified for the Championship play-offs
4	Sunderland (O, P)	46	21	13	12	58	44	+14	76	Qualified for the Championship play-offs
5	Coventry City	46	20	9	17	64	58	+6	69	Qualified for the Championship play-offs
6	Bristol City	46	17	17	12	59	55	+4	68	Qualified for the Championship play-offs
7	Blackburn Rovers	46	19	9	18	53	48	+5	66	
8	Millwall	46	18	12	16	47	49	−2	66	
9	West Bromwich Albion	46	15	19	12	57	47	+10	64	
10	Middlesbrough	46	18	10	18	64	56	+8	64	
11	Swansea City	46	17	10	19	51	56	−5	61	
12	Sheffield Wednesday	46	15	13	18	60	69	−9	58	
13	Norwich City	46	14	15	17	71	68	+3	57	
14	Watford	46	16	9	21	53	61	−8	57	
15	Queens Park Rangers	46	14	14	18	53	63	−10	56	
16	Portsmouth	46	14	12	20	58	71	−13	54	
17	Oxford United	46	13	14	19	49	65	−16	53	
18	Stoke City	46	12	15	19	45	62	−17	51	
19	Derby County	46	13	11	22	48	56	−8	50	
20	Preston North End	46	10	20	16	48	59	−11	50	
21	Hull City	46	12	13	21	44	54	−10	49	
22	Luton Town (R)	46	13	10	23	45	69	−24	49	Relegation to EFL League One
23	Plymouth Argyle (R)	46	11	13	22	51	88	−37	46	Relegation to EFL League One
24	Cardiff City (R)	46	9	17	20	48	73	−25	44	Relegation to EFL League One

Source: English Football League
Rules for classification: 1) Points; 2) Goal difference; 3) Number of goals scored; 4) Head-to-head results; 5) Wins; 6) Away goals; 7) Penalty points (sec 9.5); 8) Number of 12-point sending off offences; 9) Play-off (only if needed to determine promotion/relegation)
(C) Champions; (O) Play-off winners; (P) Promoted; (R) Relegated

== Results ==
Home \ Away	BLA	BRI	BUR	CAR	COV	DER	HUL	LEE	LUT	MID	MIL	NOR	OXF	PLY	POR	PNE	QPR	SHU	SHW	STO	SUN	SWA	WAT	WBA
Blackburn Rovers	—	3–0	0–1	1–2	0–2	4–2	0–1	1–0	2–0	0–2	4–1	1–1	2–1	2–0	3–0	2–1	2–0	0–2	2–2	0–2	2–2	1–0	2–1	0–0
Bristol City	2–1	—	0–1	1–1	1–1	1–0	1–1	0–0	1–0	2–1	4–3	2–1	2–1	4–0	3–0	2–2	1–1	1–2	0–0	2–0	2–1	0–1	2–1	2–1
Burnley	1–1	1–0	—	5–0	2–0	0–0	2–0	0–0	4–0	1–1	3–1	2–1	1–0	1–0	2–1	0–0	0–0	2–1	4–0	0–0	0–0	1–0	2–1	1–1
Cardiff City	1–3	1–1	1–2	—	1–1	2–1	1–0	0–2	1–2	0–2	1–0	2–1	1–1	5–0	2–0	0–2	0–2	0–2	1–1	0–1	0–2	3–0	1–1	0–0
Coventry City	3–0	1–0	1–2	2–2	—	1–2	2–1	0–2	3–2	2–0	0–0	0–1	3–2	4–0	1–0	2–1	1–0	2–2	1–2	3–2	3–0	1–2	2–1	2–0
Derby County	2–1	3–0	0–0	1–0	2–0	—	1–1	0–1	0–1	1–0	0–1	2–3	0–0	1–1	4–0	2–0	2–0	0–1	1–2	0–0	0–1	1–2	0–2	2–1
Hull City	0–1	1–1	1–1	4–1	1–1	0–1	—	3–3	0–1	0–1	0–0	1–1	2–1	2–0	1–1	2–1	1–2	0–2	0–2	1–2	0–1	2–1	1–1	1–2
Leeds United	1–1	4–0	0–1	7–0	3–0	2–0	2–0	—	3–0	3–1	2–0	2–0	4–0	3–0	3–3	2–1	2–0	2–0	3–0	6–0	2–1	2–2	2–1	1–1
Luton Town	0–1	3–1	1–4	1–0	1–0	2–1	1–0	1–1	—	0–0	0–1	0–1	2–2	1–1	1–0	0–0	1–2	0–1	2–1	2–1	1–2	1–1	3–0	1–1
Middlesbrough	0–1	0–2	0–0	1–1	0–3	1–0	3–1	0–1	5–1	—	1–0	0–0	2–1	2–1	2–2	1–1	2–1	1–0	3–3	2–0	2–3	1–0	0–1	2–0
Millwall	1–0	0–2	1–0	2–2	0–1	1–1	0–1	1–0	0–1	1–0	—	3–1	0–1	1–0	2–1	3–1	2–1	0–1	3–0	1–0	1–1	1–0	2–3	1–1
Norwich City	2–2	0–2	1–2	4–2	2–1	1–1	4–0	1–1	4–2	3–3	2–1	—	1–1	6–1	3–5	0–1	1–1	1–1	2–3	4–2	0–0	5–1	4–1	1–0
Oxford United	1–0	1–1	0–0	3–2	2–3	1–1	1–0	0–1	3–2	2–6	1–1	2–0	—	2–0	0–2	3–1	1–3	1–0	1–3	1–0	2–0	1–2	1–0	1–1
Plymouth Argyle	2–1	2–2	0–5	1–1	3–1	2–3	1–1	1–2	3–1	3–3	5–1	2–1	1–1	—	1–0	3–3	0–1	2–1	0–3	0–1	3–2	1–2	2–2	2–1
Portsmouth	1–0	3–0	0–0	2–1	4–1	2–2	1–1	1–0	0–0	2–1	0–1	0–0	1–1	1–2	—	3–1	2–1	0–0	1–2	3–1	1–3	4–0	1–0	0–3
Preston North End	0–0	1–3	0–0	2–2	1–0	1–1	1–0	1–1	1–0	2–1	1–1	2–2	1–1	1–2	2–1	—	1–2	0–2	3–1	1–1	0–0	0–0	3–0	1–1
Queens Park Rangers	2–1	1–1	0–5	0–0	1–1	4–0	1–3	2–2	2–1	1–4	1–1	3–0	2–0	1–1	1–2	2–1	—	1–2	0–2	1–1	0–0	1–2	3–1	1–3
Sheffield United	1–1	1–1	0–2	2–0	3–1	1–0	0–3	1–3	2–0	3–1	0–1	2–0	3–0	2–0	2–1	1–0	2–2	—	1–0	2–0	1–0	1–0	1–0	1–1
Sheffield Wednesday	0–1	2–2	0–2	1–1	1–2	4–2	0–1	0–2	1–1	2–1	2–2	2–0	0–1	4–0	1–1	1–1	1–1	0–1	—	2–0	1–2	0–0	2–6	3–2
Stoke City	1–0	2–2	0–2	2–2	1–0	2–1	1–3	0–2	1–1	1–3	1–1	1–1	0–0	0–0	6–1	0–0	3–1	0–2	2–0	—	1–0	3–1	0–0	1–2
Sunderland	0–1	1–1	1–0	2–1	2–2	2–0	0–1	2–2	2–0	1–0	1–0	2–1	2–0	2–2	1–0	1–1	0–1	2–1	4–0	2–1	—	0–1	2–2	0–0
Swansea City	3–0	1–1	0–2	1–1	0–2	1–0	1–0	3–4	2–1	1–0	0–1	1–0	3–3	3–0	2–2	3–0	3–0	1–2	0–1	0–0	2–3	—	1–0	1–1
Watford	1–0	1–0	1–2	1–2	1–1	2–1	1–0	0–4	2–0	2–1	1–2	0–1	1–0	0–0	2–1	1–2	0–0	1–2	1–1	3–0	2–1	1–0	—	2–1
West Bromwich Albion	0–2	2–0	0–0	0–0	2–0	1–3	1–1	0–0	5–3	0–1	0–0	2–2	2–0	1–0	5–1	3–1	1–0	2–2	2–1	1–1	0–1	1–0	2–1	—

Source: BBC Sport
Legend: Blue = home team win; Yellow = draw; Red = away team win.
For upcoming matches, an "a" indicates there is an article about the rivalry between the two participants.

== Play-offs ==
=== Bracket ===
Semi-finals
3	Sheffield United	3	3	6
6	Bristol City	0	0	0
4	Sunderland (a.e.t.)	2	1	3
5	Coventry City	1	1	2

Final
3	Sheffield United	1
4	Sunderland	2

=== Semi-finals ===
First leg

8 May 2025
20:00 BST

Bristol City	0–3	Sheffield United
	Report	Burrows 45+3' (pen.); Brooks 73'; O'Hare 79'

Ashton Gate, Bristol
Attendance: 25,652
Referee: Oliver Langford
9 May 2025
20:00 BST

Coventry City	1–2	Sunderland
Rudoni 70'	Report	Isidor 68'; Mayenda 88'

Coventry Building Society Arena, Coventry
Attendance: 31,293
Referee: John Busby

Second leg

12 May 2025
20:00 BST

Sheffield United	3–0	Bristol City
Moore 41'; Hamer 52'; O'Hare 83'	Report

Bramall Lane, Sheffield
Attendance: 26,543
Referee: Peter Bankes

Sheffield United won 6–0 on aggregate.

13 May 2025
20:00 BST

Sunderland	1–1 (a.e.t.)	Coventry City
Ballard 120+2'	Report	Mason-Clark 76'

Stadium of Light, Sunderland
Attendance: 46,530
Referee: Andrew Madley

Sunderland won 3–2 on aggregate.

=== Final ===
24 May 2025
15:01 BST

Sheffield United	1–2	Sunderland
Campbell 25'	Report	Mayenda 76'; Watson 90+5'

Wembley Stadium, London
Attendance: 82,718
Referee: Chris Kavanagh

== Season statistics ==
=== Top scorers ===
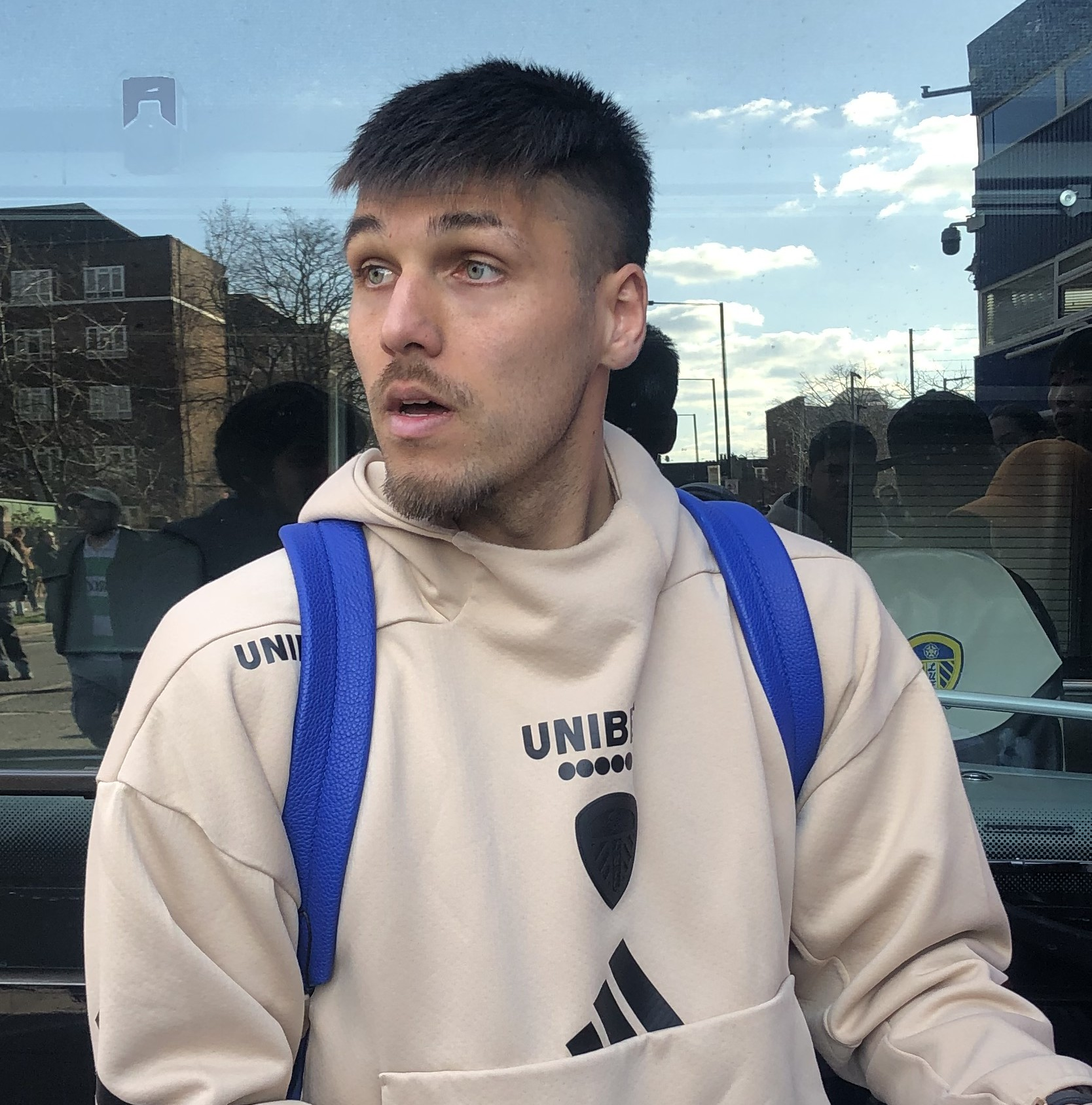
Joël Piroe of Leeds United was the season's top goalscorer, having scored 19 goals.

Rank	Player	Club	Goals
1	(Suriname) Joël Piroe	Leeds United	19
2	(England) Josh Brownhill	Burnley	18
2	(Spain) Borja Sainz	Norwich City	18
4	(United States) Josh Sargent	Norwich City	15
5	(Scotland) Tommy Conway	Middlesbrough	13
5	(Haiti) Wilson Isidor^{1}	Sunderland	13
5	(England) Josh Windass	Sheffield Wednesday	13
8	(Republic of Ireland) Finn Azaz	Middlesbrough	12
8	(Netherlands) Zian Flemming	Burnley	12
8	(Serbia) Mihailo Ivanović	Millwall	12
8	(Wales) Daniel James	Leeds United	12
8	(Nigeria) Josh Maja	West Bromwich Albion	12
8	(Albania) Anis Mehmeti	Bristol City	12
8	(Denmark) Emil Riis Jakobsen	Preston North End	12
8	(Republic of Ireland) Callum Robinson	Cardiff City	12
8	(United States) Haji Wright	Coventry City	12

- ^{1} Includes 1 goal in The Championship play-offs.

=== Hat-tricks ===
Player	For	Against	Result	Date
(Nigeria) Josh Maja	West Bromwich Albion	Queens Park Rangers	3–1 (A)	10 August 2024
(Spain) Borja Sainz	Norwich City	Derby County	3–2 (A)	28 September 2024
(Republic of Ireland) Tom Cannon^{4}	Stoke City	Portsmouth	6–1 (H)	2 October 2024
(Ivory Coast) Vakoun Bayo^{4}	Watford	Sheffield Wednesday	6–2 (A)	2 November 2024
(Ivory Coast) Emmanuel Latte Lath	Middlesbrough	Oxford United	6–2 (A)	23 November 2024
(Spain) Borja Sainz	Norwich City	Plymouth Argyle	6–1 (H)	26 November 2024
(England) Callum Lang^{4}	Portsmouth	Coventry City	4–1 (H)	21 December 2024
(United States) Haji Wright	Coventry City	Sunderland	3–0 (H)	15 March 2025
(England) Colby Bishop	Portsmouth	Norwich City	5–3 (A)	18 April 2025
(Suriname) Joël Piroe^{4}	Leeds United	Stoke City	6–0 (H)	21 April 2025

Note: ^{4} – player scored 4 goals

=== Clean sheets ===
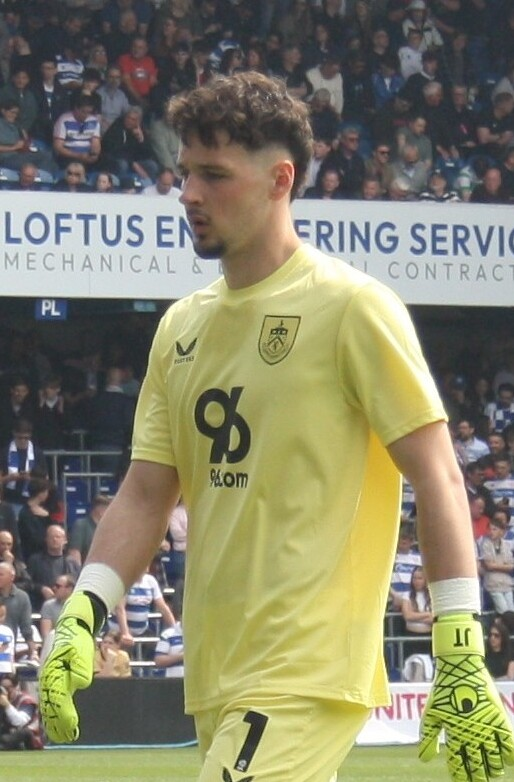
James Trafford of Burnley won The Golden Glove, having kept 29 clean sheets, equalling the record for a goalkeeper in a single English football league season.

Rank	Player	Club	Clean sheets
1	(England) James Trafford	Burnley	29
2	(England) Michael Cooper^{2}	Sheffield United	23
3	(France) Illan Meslier	Leeds United	21
4	(Denmark) Lukas Jensen	Millwall	14
4	(Sweden) Viktor Johansson	Stoke City	14
4	(England) Anthony Patterson	Sunderland	14
4	(Chile) Lawrence Vigouroux	Swansea City	14
8	(England) Jamie Cumming	Oxford United	13
8	(England) Aynsley Pears	Blackburn Rovers	13
8	(England) Freddie Woodman	Preston North End	13

- ^{2} Includes 2 clean sheets in The Championship play-offs.

=== Discipline ===
==== Player ====
- Most yellow cards: 13
  - (Netherlands) Gustavo Hamer (Sheffield United)
- Most red cards: 3
  - (England) Liam Walsh (Luton Town)

==== Club ====
- Most yellow cards: 116
  - Portsmouth
- Most red cards: 7
  - Luton Town
- Fewest yellow cards: 67
  - Middlesbrough
- Fewest red cards: 0
  - Derby County
  - Leeds United
  - Oxford United
  - Stoke City

== Awards ==
=== Monthly ===
Month	Manager of the Month		Player of the Month		Reference
August	(France) Régis Le Bris	Sunderland	(Wales) Mark Harris	Oxford United	
September	(England) Chris Wilder	Sheffield United	(Spain) Borja Sainz	Norwich City	
October	(France) Régis Le Bris	Sunderland	(Spain) Borja Sainz	Norwich City	
November	(England) Chris Wilder	Sheffield United	(Republic of Ireland) Finn Azaz	Middlesbrough	
December	(Germany) Daniel Farke	Leeds United	(Jamaica) Ephron Mason-Clark	Coventry City	
January	(England) Gary Rowett	Oxford United	(England) James Trafford	Burnley	
February	(Germany) Daniel Farke	Leeds United	(Wales) Daniel James	Leeds United	
March	(England) Chris Wilder	Sheffield United	(England) Tyrese Campbell	Sheffield United	
April	(England) Scott Parker	Burnley	(England) Josh Brownhill	Burnley	

=== Annual ===
Award	Winner	Club
Player of the Season	(Netherlands) Gustavo Hamer	Sheffield United
Young Player of the Season	(England) Jobe Bellingham	Sunderland
Apprentice of the Season	(England) Chris Rigg	Sunderland

Championship Team of the Season

Pos.	Player	Club	Ref.
GK	(England) James Trafford	Burnley	
RB	(England) Jayden Bogle	Leeds United	
CB	(France) Maxime Estève	Burnley	
CB	(England) CJ Egan-Riley	Burnley	
LB	(England) Harrison Burrows	Sheffield United	
CM	(England) Jobe Bellingham	Sunderland	
CM	(Japan) Ao Tanaka	Leeds United	
AM	(Netherlands) Gustavo Hamer	Sheffield United	
RW	(Wales) Daniel James	Leeds United	
LW	(Spain) Borja Sainz	Norwich City	
FW	(United States) Josh Sargent	Norwich City	
Manager	(England) Scott Parker	Burnley	

== Attendances ==
Sunderland drew the highest average home attendance in the 2024–25 edition of the EFL Championship.

#	Football club	Home games	Average attendance
1	Sunderland	23	40,425
2	Leeds United	23	36,134
3	Derby County	23	29,018
4	Sheffield United	23	28,087
5	Coventry City	23	27,816
6	Sheffield Wednesday	23	26,636
7	Norwich City	23	26,316
8	Middlesbrough	23	25,416
9	West Bromwich Albion	23	25,057
10	Stoke City	23	22,804
11	Bristol City	23	22,423
12	Hull City	23	21,323
13	Portsmouth	23	20,263
14	Burnley	23	19,876
15	Watford	23	19,379
16	Cardiff City	23	19,344
17	Plymouth Argyle	23	16,537
18	Preston North End	23	16,505
19	Blackburn Rovers	23	16,161
20	Queens Park Rangers	23	15,856
21	Swansea City	23	15,503
22	Millwall	23	15,490
23	Luton Town	23	11,555
24	Oxford United	23	11,358
