= Tatsuki Seko =

Japanese footballer (born 1997)

Tatsuki Seko 瀬古 樹
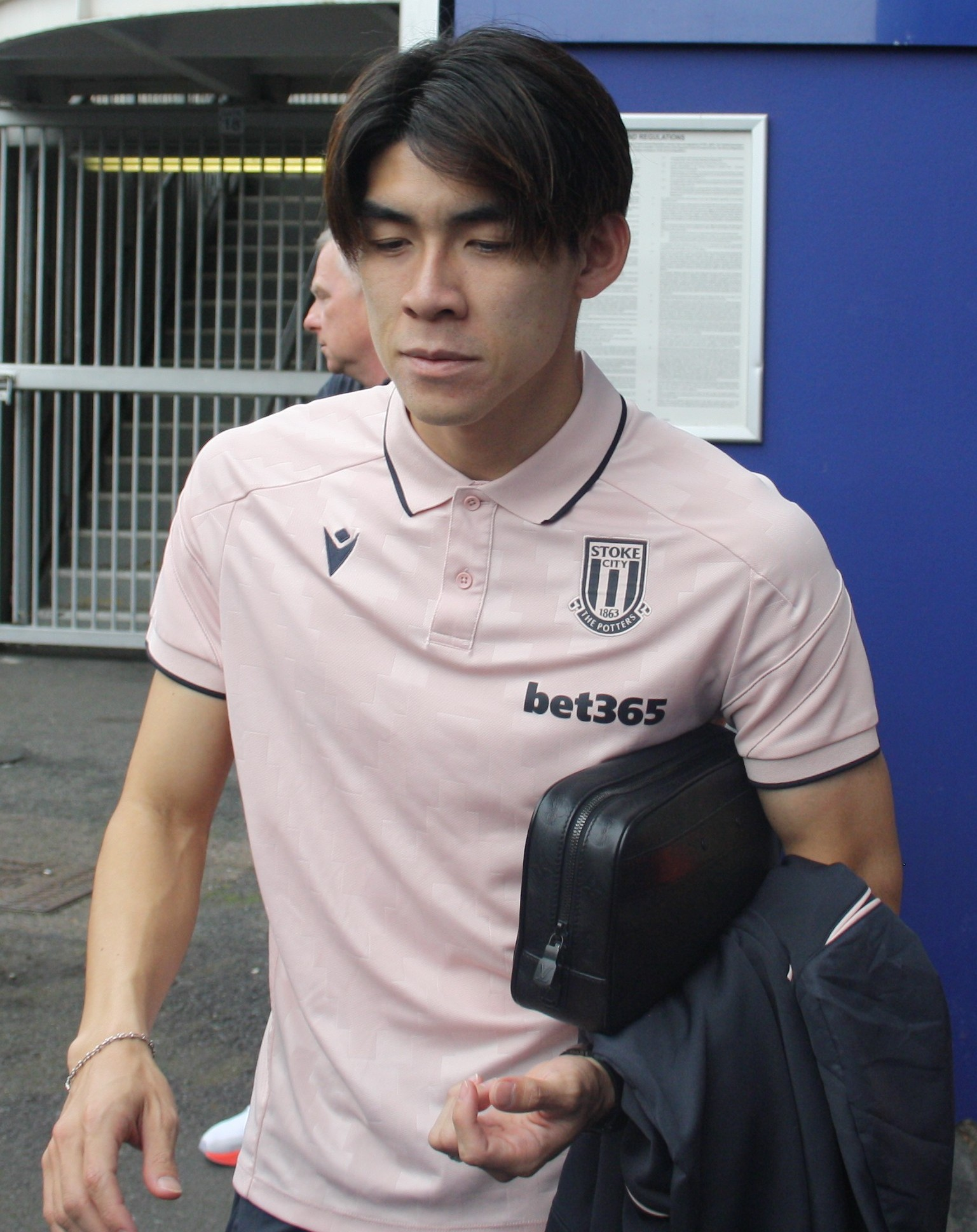
- Seko with Stoke City in 2025.

Personal information
- Full name: Tatsuki Seko
- Date of birth: 22 December 1997 (age 28)
- Place of birth: Adachi, Tokyo, Japan
- Height: 1.75 m (5 ft 9 in)
- Position: Defensive midfielder

Team information
- Current team: Urawa Red Diamonds
- Number: 12

Youth career
- 2008–2015: Mitsubishi Yowa

College career
Years	Team	Apps	(Gls)
2016–2019	Meiji University		

Senior career*
Years	Team	Apps	(Gls)
2020–2021	Yokohama FC	66	(3)
2022–2024	Kawasaki Frontale	66	(1)
2024–2026	Stoke City	68	(0)
2026–	Urawa Red Diamonds	0	(0)
- * Club domestic league appearances and goals as of 13:45, 2 May 2026 (UTC)

Tatsuki Seko (瀬古 樹, Seko Tatsuki; born 22 December 1997) is a Japanese professional footballer who plays as defensive midfielder for J1 League club Urawa Red Diamonds.

== Career ==
=== Early career ===
Seko was born in Adachi, Tokyo and began playing football with the youth teams at Mitsubishi Yowa and in 2015 he was selected to play for the Japan national under-18 team and participated in a training camp. He entered Meiji University in 2016 and was a regular with the football team from his fourth year. In 2019 he rejected an offer from J2 League side Montedio Yamagata and later agreed to turn professional with Yokohama FC in 2020. In August of the same year Seko was approved as a J.League designated special player.

=== Yokohama FC ===
Seko officially joined Yokohama FC on 13 January 2020. He made his J1 League debut on the opening day against Vissel Kobe, scoring in a 1–1 draw, which was Yokohama's first top-flight goal for 13 years. Seko played 36 times in the 2020 J1 League season as relegation was scrapped due to the COVID-19 pandemic and Yokohama finished in 15th place. In the 2021 season Seko played 38 times as Yokohama were relegated finishing in 20th.

=== Kawasaki Frontale ===
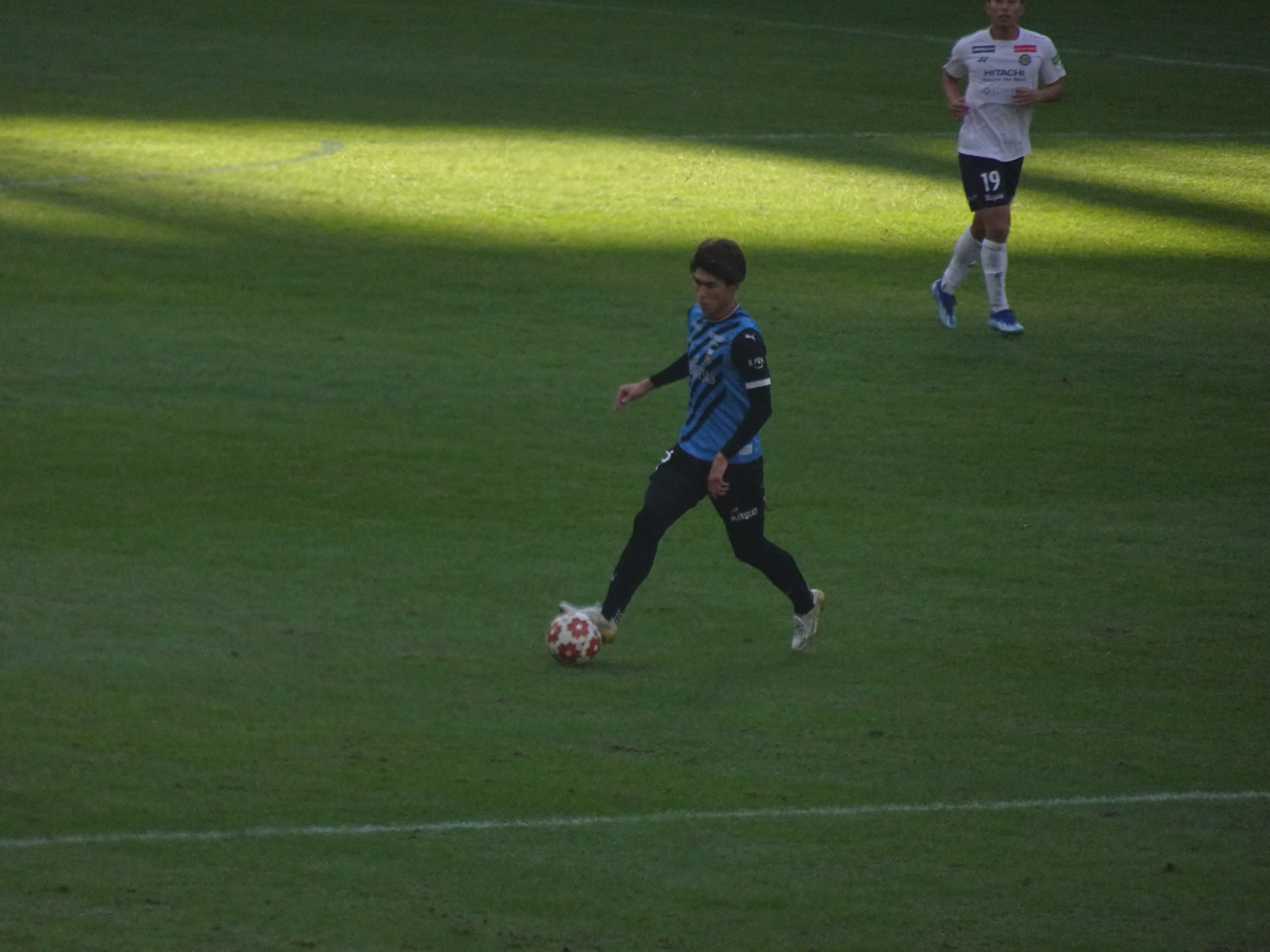
Seko playing for Kawasaki Frontale in 2023.

Following Yokohama's relegation Seko was reported to be wanted by J1 League clubs Nagoya Grampus and Sanfrecce Hiroshima. Eventually league champions Kawasaki Frontale signed Seko on 23 December 2021. He made 19 appearances in the 2022 season as Kawasaki missed out on the league title by two points to Yokohama F. Marinos. In the 2023 season, Seko played 39 times as Frontale finished in 8th position and won the 2023 Emperor's Cup after beating Kashiwa Reysol in the final on penalties. Seko was captain as Kawasaki Frontale defeated Vissel Kobe 1–0 in the 2024 Japanese Super Cup. It was announced by Frontale in August 2024 that Seko had left the team to complete a move abroad.

=== Stoke City ===
Seko signed a three-year contract with EFL Championship club Stoke City on 30 August 2024. Seko made 28 appearances in the 2024–25 season, as Stoke avoided relegation on the final day, finishing in 18th position. Seko played a lot more regularly in 2025–26, making 47 appearances as Stoke again finished in a bottom half position of 17th.

=== Urawa Red Diamonds ===
After two seasons playing in English football, Seko returned to Japan in August 2026, signing for Urawa Red Diamonds.

== Career statistics ==
As of match played 2 May 2026.

Club	Season	League			National cup (Note: Includes Emperor's Cup and FA Cup)		League cup (Note: Includes EFL Cup and J. League Cup)		Contentinal		Other		Total	
Club	Season	Division	Apps	Goals	Apps	Goals	Apps	Goals	Apps	Goals	Apps	Goals	Apps	Goals
Meiji University	2019	—			2	0	—		—		—		2	0
Yokohama FC	2020	J1 League	33	2	0	0	3	0	—		0	0	36	2
Yokohama FC	2021	J1 League	33	1	0	0	5	0	—		0	0	38	1
Yokohama FC	Total		66	3	0	0	8	0	—		0	0	74	3
Kawasaki Frontale	2022	J1 League	13	0	2	1	1	0	2 (Note: Appearances in AFC Champions League)	0	1 (Note: Appearances in Japanese Super Cup)	0	19	1
Kawasaki Frontale	2023	J1 League	28	1	6	2	5	2	0	0	0	0	39	5
Kawasaki Frontale	2024	J1 League	25	0	2	0	0	0	7	1	1	0	35	1
Kawasaki Frontale	Total		66	1	10	3	6	2	9	1	2	0	93	7
Stoke City	2024–25	EFL Championship	25	0	2	0	1	0	—		—		28	0
Stoke City	2025–26	EFL Championship	43	0	2	0	2	0	—		—		47	0
Stoke City	Total		68	0	4	0	3	0	—		—		75	0
Urawa Red Diamonds	2026–27	J1 League	0	0	0	0	0	0	0	0	0	0	0	0
Career total			200	4	16	3	17	2	9	1	2	0	242	10

== Honours ==
Kawasaki Frontale

- Emperor's Cup: 2023
- Japanese Super Cup: 2024
