= Sol Sidibe =

English footballer (born 2007)

Personal information
- Full name: Souleymane Lamine Sidibe
- Date of birth: 10 February 2007 (age 19)
- Place of birth: Paris, France
- Height: 1.84 m (6 ft 0 in)
- Position: Defensive midfielder

Team information
- Current team: Jong PSV

Youth career
- 2015–2023: Stoke City

Senior career*
Years	Team	Apps	(Gls)
2023–2025	Stoke City	12	(0)
2025–	Jong PSV	38	(1)

International career^{‡}
2023	England U17	2	(0)
2024–2025	England U18	11	(0)
2025–2026	England U19	11	(1)
2026-	England U20	1	(0)
- * Club domestic league appearances and goals as of 28 April 2026 ‡ National team caps and goals as of 17:20, 28 September 2026 (UTC)

Souleymane Lamine Sidibe (born 10 February 2007) is a professional footballer who plays as a defensive midfielder for Eerste Divisie club Jong PSV. Born in France, he represents England at youth level.

== Early life ==
Sidibe was born on 10 February 2007 in Paris, France. He moved to the United Kingdom at an early age, growing up in Stoke-on-Trent. He is the son of the Malian international footballer Mamady Sidibé.

== Club career ==
=== Stoke City ===
Sidibe progressed through the Stoke City Academy and agreed a professional contract in July 2023, active from his 17th birthday. He made his professional debut on 5 August 2023 against Rotherham United at the age of 16. Three days later, Sidibe made his first start for the Potters in a 2–1 victory over West Bromwich Albion in the first round of the EFL Cup. He signed a three-year professional contract with Stoke in July 2024.

=== PSV Eindhoven ===
On 1 August 2025, Sidibe joined Dutch side PSV Eindhoven for an undisclosed fee. He was assigned to their reserve team that plays in Eerste Divisie, Jong PSV.

== International career ==
Sidibe is eligible to represent England, France, Mali, or Senegal.

He was called up to the England U15s in September 2021. On 6 September 2023, Sidibe made his England U17 debut during a 3–2 defeat to Portugal at the Pinatar Arena. In May 2024, he was called up for England U18s and made his debut during a 4–2 win over Northern Ireland at St. George's Park.

Sidibe made his England U19 debut during a 2–0 win over Ukraine at Pinatar Arena on 3 September 2025.

He made his debut for the England U20 during a 3-1 win over Italy at the Estadi Olympic Camilo Cano on 25 September 2026.

== Career statistics ==
As of match played 6 March 2026

Appearances and goals by club, season and competition
Club	Season	League			FA Cup		League Cup		Other		Total	
Club	Season	Division	Apps	Goals	Apps	Goals	Apps	Goals	Apps	Goals	Apps	Goals
Stoke City	2023–24	Championship	4	0	1	0	3	0	—		8	0
Stoke City	2024–25	Championship	8	0	1	0	4	0	—		13	0
Stoke City	Total		12	0	2	0	7	0	—		21	0
Jong PSV	2025–26	Eerste Divisie	30	1	—		—		—		30	1
Career total			42	1	2	0	7	0	0	0	51	1
