= Tom Cannon (footballer) =

Irish footballer (born 2002)

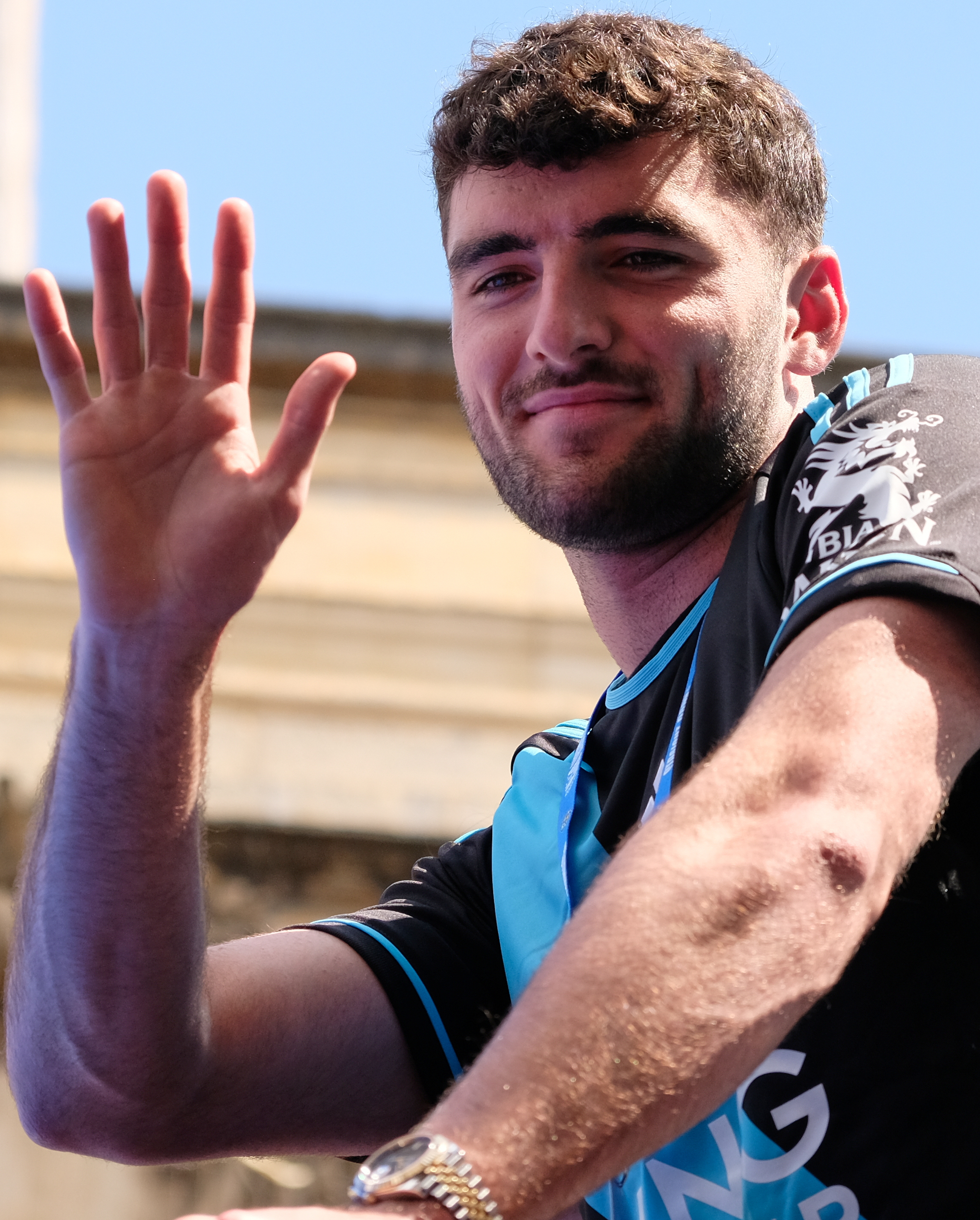
- Cannon with Leicester City in 2024

Personal information
- Full name: Thomas Christopher Cannon
- Date of birth: 28 December 2002 (age 23)
- Place of birth: Aintree, England
- Height: 1.80 m (5 ft 11 in)
- Position: Striker

Team information
- Current team: Sheffield United
- Number: 9

Youth career
- 2012–2022: Everton

Senior career*
Years	Team	Apps	(Gls)
2021–2023	Everton	3	(0)
2023	→ Preston North End (loan)	20	(8)
2023–2025	Leicester City	13	(2)
2024–2025	→ Stoke City (loan)	22	(9)
2025–	Sheffield United	66	(10)

International career^{‡}
2019	Republic of Ireland U19	2	(1)
2022	Republic of Ireland U20	1	(0)
2023	Republic of Ireland U21	1	(1)
2024–	Republic of Ireland	5	(2)
- * Club domestic league appearances and goals as of 21 November 2026 ‡ National team caps and goals as of 2 October 2026

Thomas Christopher Cannon (born 28 December 2002) is a professional footballer who plays as a striker for EFL Championship club Sheffield United. Born in England, he represents the Republic of Ireland national team.

== Club career ==
=== Everton ===
Cannon was born in Aintree and attended Maricourt High School in Maghull. Cannon is a youth product of Everton, having signed with the club at the age of 10. He signed his first professional contract in March 2021, penning a two-year contract until June 2023. He signed a contract extension in August 2022 which would take him to June 2025. He made his senior debut with Everton as a late substitute in a 4–1 EFL Cup loss to AFC Bournemouth on 8 November 2022. Cannon went on to make his Premier League debut as a 74th-minute substitute in Everton's 3–0 away loss to Bournemouth on 12 November 2022.

==== Loan to Preston North End ====
On 10 January 2023, Cannon joined Championship club Preston North End on loan until the end of the season. He made his Championship debut four days later, starting in a 4–0 loss against Norwich City. On 25 February, he scored his first goal for the club, in a 2–1 win against Wigan Athletic. Cannon scored both goals in a 2–0 win against Queens Park Rangers on 7 April 2023. Cannon scored eight goals in 21 appearances for North End as they ended 2022–23 in 12th position.

=== Leicester City ===
On 1 September 2023, Cannon joined Championship club Leicester City on a five-year contract. It was later revealed that a stress fracture in his back had been discovered during his medical. He made his debut for Leicester on 9 December 2023, as a 63rd-minute substitute in a 4–0 win against Plymouth Argyle. On 1 January 2024, he scored his first and second goal for the club, netting twice in a 4–1 home win over Huddersfield Town. He also scored the following week in the FA Cup against Millwall.

==== Loan to Stoke City ====
Cannon joined Stoke City on loan for the 2024–25 season on 30 August 2024. On the 2 October 2024, Cannon scored four goals in a 6–1 win against Portsmouth and in doing so, was the first player to score four goals for Stoke since Peter Thorne in March 2000. After scoring 11 goals in 25 appearances for Stoke, he was recalled by Leicester City on 15 January 2025.

=== Sheffield United ===
On 23 January 2025, Cannon joined fellow Championship club Sheffield United for an undisclosed transfer fee that was reported to be worth up to £10 million.

== International career ==
Cannon received his first call up for the Republic of Ireland Under 19s squad in October 2019 and played in three Under 19 European Championship qualifier matches against Switzerland, Gibraltar and Denmark, scoring his first international goal against Gibraltar. Cannon was next called up to an Under 20s squad in March 2022 and played in a friendly match against an Ireland Amateurs side. His first call up for the Republic of Ireland U21 team came in March 2023, for a friendly against Iceland U21. In May 2023, Cannon was called into a training camp with the Republic of Ireland senior national team by manager Stephen Kenny. In 2023 it was also reported that the English FA approached Cannon to try and convince him to play for England internationally rather than the Republic of Ireland.

On 28 May 2024, Cannon received his first official call-up to the Republic of Ireland senior national team for two friendly matches against Hungary and Portugal, making his debut appearance as a substitute against Portugal.

On 16 May 2026, he scored his first senior goals for Ireland, coming on at half time and scoring the first 2 goals of the game in a 5–0 victory over Grenada in a friendly.

== Career statistics ==
=== Club ===
As of 14 October 2026

Appearances and goals by club, season and competition
Club	Season	League			FA Cup		League Cup		Other		Total	
Club	Season	Division	Apps	Goals	Apps	Goals	Apps	Goals	Apps	Goals	Apps	Goals
Everton U21	2021–22	—	—		—		—		2 (Note: Appearances in EFL Trophy)	0	2	0
Everton U21	2022–23	—	—		—		—		5	5	5	5
Everton U21	Total		—		—		—		7	5	7	5
Everton	2022–23	Premier League	2	0	0	0	1	0	—		3	0
Everton	2023–24	Premier League	1	0	0	0	0	0	—		1	0
Everton	Total		3	0	0	0	1	0	—		4	0
Preston North End (loan)	2022–23	Championship	20	8	1	0	0	0	—		21	8
Leicester City	2023–24	Championship	13	2	3	1	0	0	—		16	3
Leicester City	2024–25	Premier League	0	0	0	0	0	0	—		0	0
Leicester City	Total		13	2	3	1	0	0	—		16	3
Stoke City (loan)	2024–25	Championship	22	9	1	1	2	1	—		25	11
Sheffield United	2024–25	Championship	15	1	—		—		2 (Note: Appearances in EFL Championship play-offs)	0	17	1
Sheffield United	2025–26	Championship	36	6	0	0	1	0	0	0	37	6
Sheffield United	2026–27	Championship	9	3	0	0	3	1	0	0	12	4
Sheffield United	Total		60	10	0	0	4	1	2	0	66	11
Career total			118	29	5	2	7	2	9	5	139	38

=== International ===
As of match played 1 October 2026

Appearances and goals by national team and year
National team	Year	Apps	Goals
Republic of Ireland
Republic of Ireland	2024	2	0
Republic of Ireland	2025	0	0
Republic of Ireland	2026	3	2
Total		5	2

List of international goals scored by Tom Cannon
No.	Date	Venue	Opponent	Score	Result	Competition
1	16 May 2026	Estadio Nueva Condomina, Murcia, Spain	Grenada	1–0	5–0	Friendly
2	16 May 2026	Estadio Nueva Condomina, Murcia, Spain	Grenada	2–0	5–0	Friendly

== Honours ==
Leicester City

- EFL Championship: 2023–24
