= Viktor Johansson =

Swedish footballer (born 1998)

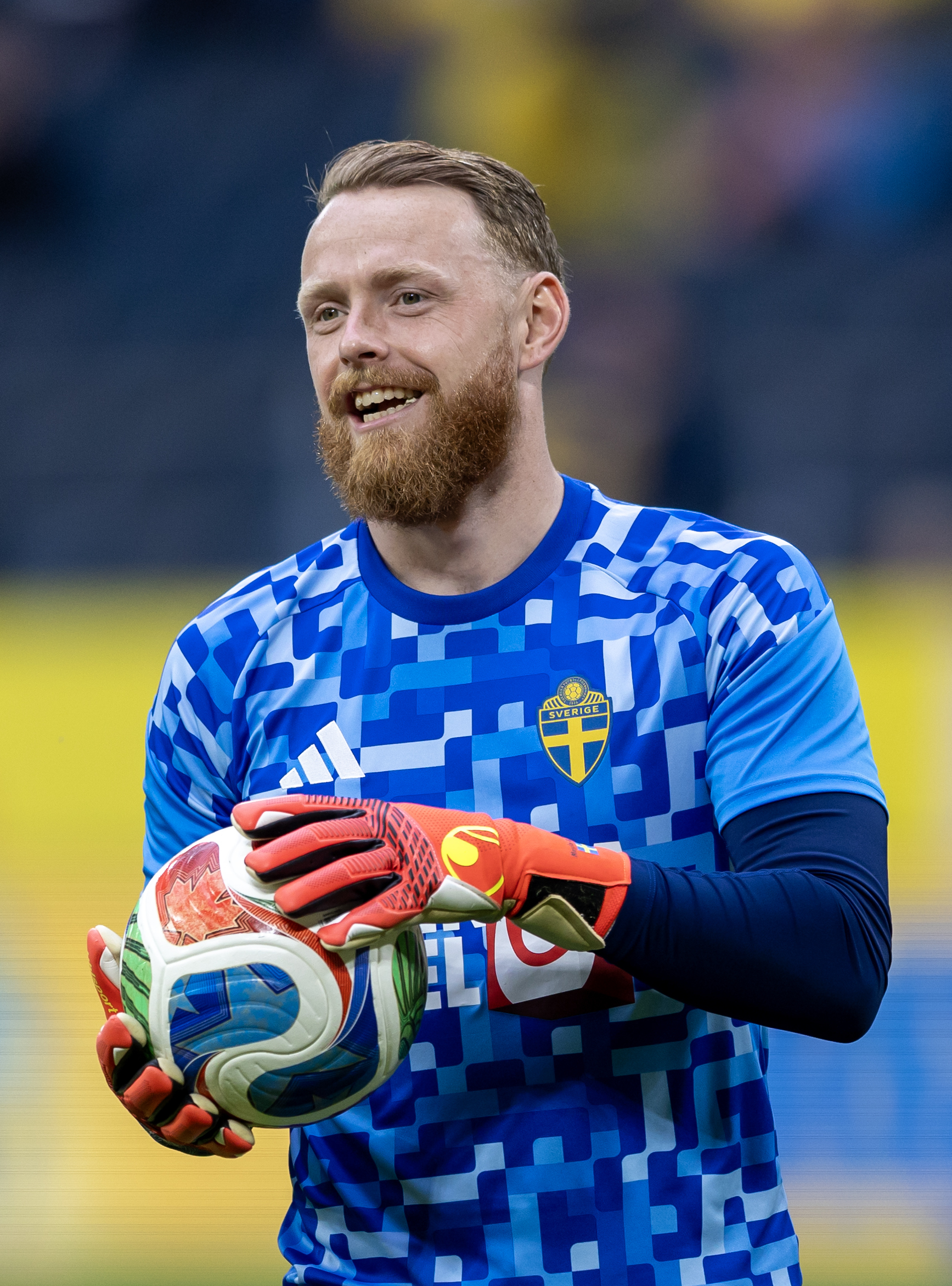
- Johansson with Sweden in 2026

Personal information
- Full name: Tobias Viktor Johansson
- Date of birth: 14 September 1998 (age 28)
- Height: 1.87 m (6 ft 2 in)
- Position: Goalkeeper

Team information
- Current team: Stoke City
- Number: 1

Youth career
- 2010–2012: Stuvsta
- 2012–2015: Hammarby
- 2015–2017: Aston Villa

Senior career*
Years	Team	Apps	(Gls)
2017–2018	Aston Villa	0	(0)
2018	→ Alfreton Town (loan)	9	(0)
2018–2020	Leicester City	0	(0)
2020–2024	Rotherham United	135	(0)
2024–	Stoke City	87	(0)

International career^{‡}
2013	Sweden U17	2	(0)
2016–2018	Sweden U19	8	(0)
2019	Sweden U21	1	(0)
2023–	Sweden	17	(0)
- * Club domestic league appearances and goals as of 20:31, 21 November 2026 (UTC) ‡ National team caps and goals as of 21:38, 14 November 2026 (UTC)

Tobias Viktor Johansson (born 14 September 1998) is a Swedish professional footballer who plays as a goalkeeper for EFL Championship club Stoke City, which he captains, and the Sweden national team.

A product of the Hammarby and Aston Villa academies, Johansson spent two years at Premier League side Leicester City but only appeared in EFL Trophy matches for their U21 side. He joined Rotherham United in September 2020. In 2021–22 he helped Rotherham gain promotion to the Championship and win the EFL Trophy. He spent four seasons at the New York Stadium before leaving for Stoke City in May 2024.

He has represented Sweden at youth and senior international levels.

== Club career ==
=== Early career ===
Johansson spent his early career with Stuvsta, Hammarby, Aston Villa, Alfreton Town and Leicester City.

=== Rotherham United ===
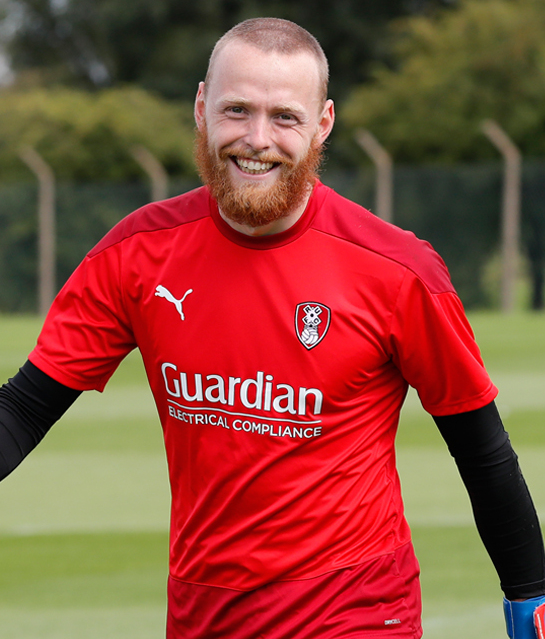
Johansson training with Rotherham United in 2020.

In September 2020 he signed for Rotherham United. He made his first appearance in a 2–1 win at home against Preston North End on 7 November 2020. Johansson was praised for his performances in 2020–21 and he received the club's Young Player of the Year award. Rotherham were relegated on the final day of the season. Johansson helped the club gain an instant return to the Championship in 2021–22 finishing 2nd and also winning the EFL Trophy final at Wembley after beating Sutton United 4–2.

Johansson later recorded the Championship's highest goals prevented statistic of 8.5 goals prevented across the entire season. Johansson was linked with moves away from the club throughout the season but he opted to sign a new contract with the club, running until summer 2025. His performances were recognised by the club and manager, winning his first Player of the Year award. Manager Matt Taylor singled out Johansson as the star performer in the team stating "he's the best goalkeeper in the championship" and his shot stopping ability was at times "in the world class category."

Following relegation in the 2023–24 season, it was reported by The Yorkshire Post that Johansson had a £1 million relegation release clause in his contract. As a thank you to the Rotherham United fans, Johansson paid for 600 free pints of beer prior to the club's last game of the season against Cardiff City.

=== Stoke City ===
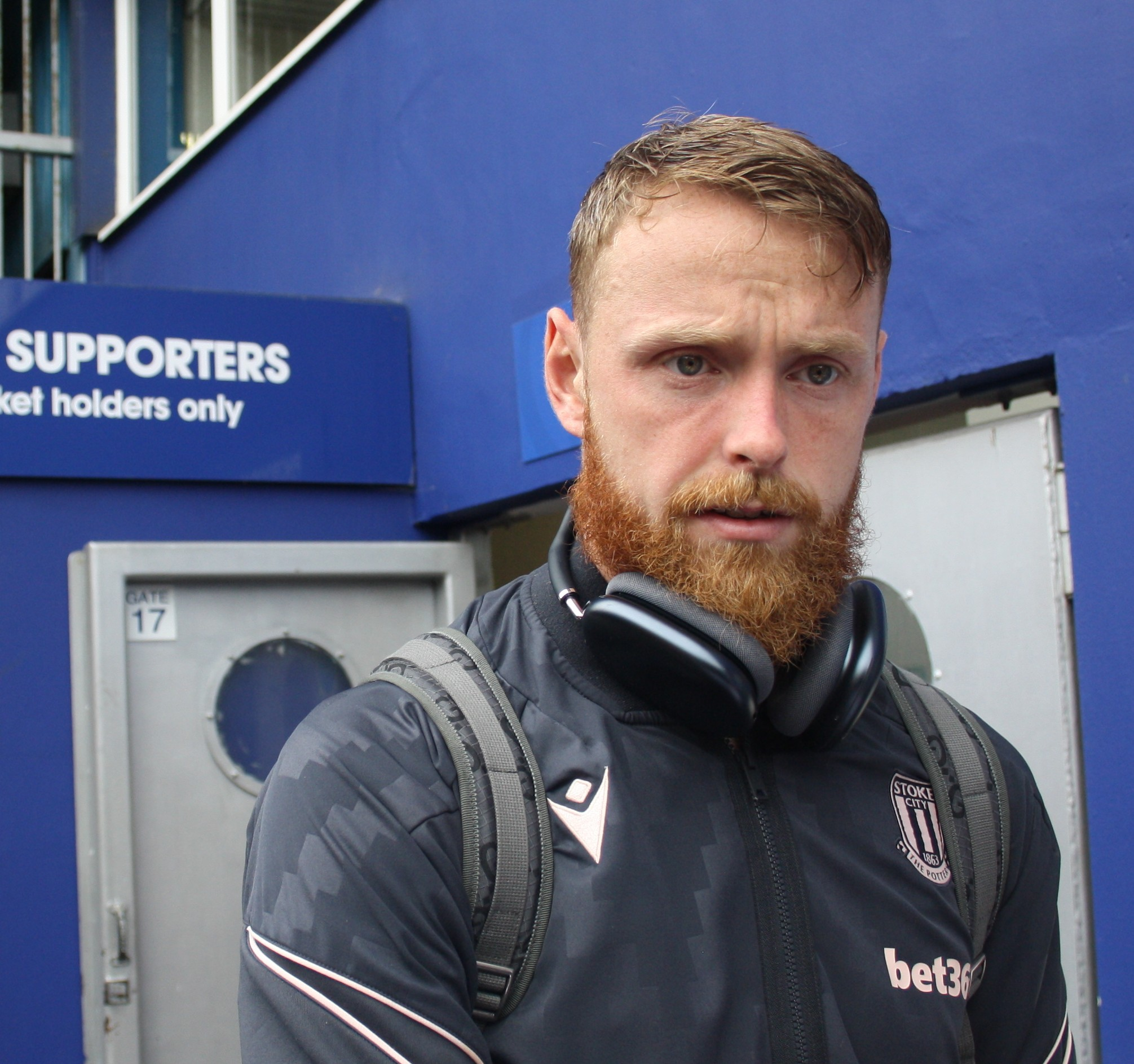
Johansson with Stoke City in 2025

Johansson joined Stoke City on 18 May 2024, signing a three-year contract for an undisclosed fee. Johansson played in all 46 of Stoke's Championship matches in 2024–25, as they avoided relegation on the final day of the season, finishing in 18th. His performances during the season saw him named as player of the year. In 2025–26, Johansson, was an ever-present up until he dislocated his shoulder playing against Sheffield United on 29 December 2025. After undergoing surgery he made his first-team return for the season finale against Bristol City.

On 1 May 2026, Johansson signed a new four-year deal with Stoke. Johansson took over as club captain ahead of the 2026–27 season.

== International career ==
Johansson has represented Sweden at under-17, under-19 and under-21 youth levels. In March 2023, he received his first call-up to the Swedish senior national team for the UEFA Euro 2024 qualifying matches against Belgium and Azerbaijan. Johansson received his first cap for Sweden when he came on at half time against Moldova in October 2023.

He was named in the Sweden squad for the 2026 FIFA World Cup.

== Career statistics ==
=== Club ===
As of match played 21 November 2026

Appearances and goals by club, season and competition
Club	Season	League			National cup		League cup		Other		Total	
Club	Season	Division	Apps	Goals	Apps	Goals	Apps	Goals	Apps	Goals	Apps	Goals
Aston Villa	2017–18	Championship	0	0	0	0	0	0	0	0	0	0
Alfreton Town (loan)	2017–18	National League North	9	0	0	0	—		0	0	9	0
Leicester City	2018–19	Premier League	0	0	0	0	0	0	—		0	0
Leicester City	2019–20	Premier League	0	0	0	0	0	0	—		0	0
Leicester City	Total		0	0	0	0	0	0	—		0	0
Leicester City U21	2018–19	—	—		—		—		2 (Note: Appearances in the EFL Trophy)	0	2	0
Leicester City U21	2019–20	—	—		—		—		4	0	4	0
Leicester City U21	Total		—		—		—		7	0	7	0
Rotherham United	2020–21	Championship	21	0	0	0	0	0	—		21	0
Rotherham United	2021–22	League One	26	0	1	0	1	0	5	0	33	0
Rotherham United	2022–23	Championship	43	0	1	0	0	0	—		44	0
Rotherham United	2023–24	Championship	45	0	1	0	0	0	—		46	0
Rotherham United	Total		135	0	3	0	1	0	5	0	144	0
Stoke City	2024–25	Championship	46	0	1	0	2	0	—		49	0
Stoke City	2025–26	Championship	25	0	0	0	0	0	—		25	0
Stoke City	2026–27	Championship	16	0	0	0	1	0	—		17	0
Stoke City	Total		87	0	1	0	3	0	0	0	91	0
Career total			232	0	4	0	4	0	11	0	250	0

=== International ===
As of 14 November 2026

Appearances and goals by national team and year
National team	Year	Apps	Goals
Sweden
Sweden	2023	1	0
Sweden	2024	6	0
Sweden	2025	5	0
Sweden	2026	5	0
Total		17	0

== Honours ==
Rotherham United

- League One runner-up: 2021–22
- EFL Trophy: 2021–22

Individual

- Rotherham United Young Player of the Season: 2020–21
- Rotherham United Player of the Season: 2022–23, 2023–24
- Stoke City Player of the Year: 2024–25
- Swedish Goalkeeper of the Year: 2024, 2025
