= Narcís Pèlach =

Spanish football coach (born 1988)

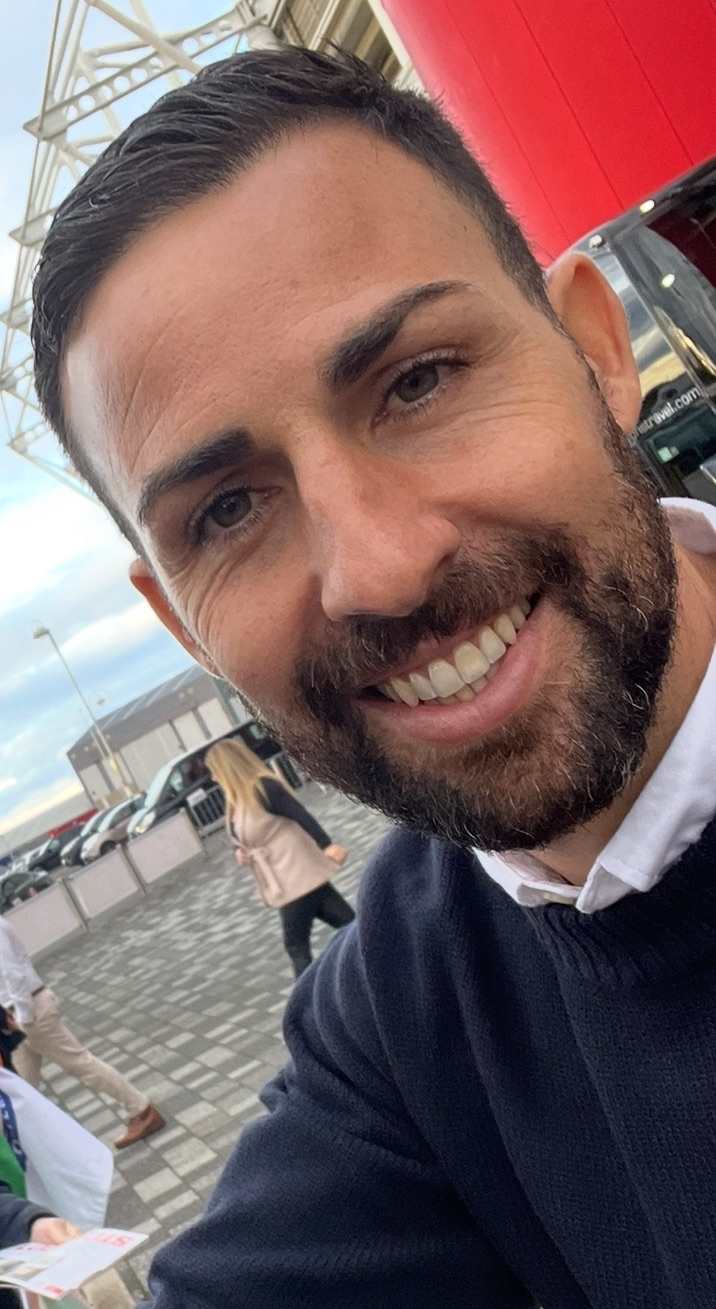
- Pèlach in 2024

Personal information
- Full name: Narcís Pèlach Nadal
- Date of birth: 5 September 1988 (age 38)
- Place of birth: Girona, Spain
- Position: Defender

Team information
- Current team: RB Omiya Ardija (manager)

Youth career
- 1994–2007: Girona

Senior career*
Years	Team	Apps	(Gls)
2007–2010	Cassà		
2010–2011	Manlleu		
2011–2014	Palamós		
2014–2016	Figueres	59	(2)

Managerial career
- 2014–2016: Figueres (youth)
- 2016–2018: Figueres
- 2018–2019: Peralada
- 2022: Huddersfield Town (interim)
- 2023: Huddersfield Town (interim)
- 2024: Stoke City
- 2026–: RB Omiya Ardija
- * Club domestic league appearances and goals

Narcís Pèlach Nadal (born 5 September 1988), sometimes known as Chicho, is a Spanish professional football coach and former player who is the manager of J2 League club RB Omiya Ardija.

== Playing career ==
Pèlach was born in Girona, Catalonia, and joined the youth categories of hometown club Girona at the age of five. He left the side in August 2007, and signed for Tercera División newcomers Cassà.

On 24 June 2010, after Cassá's relegation, Pèlach moved to fellow fourth tier side Manlleu. He joined Palamós in the Primera Catalana in July of the following year, and helped in their promotion back to the fourth division in his first season.

On 29 May 2014, Pèlach and teammate Ritxi signed for Figueres still in the fourth level. He retired in May 2016, aged just 27.

== Coaching career ==
Immediately after joining Figueres, Pèlach started working as a coach of their Juvenil B team, being named in charge of the Juvenil A side on 28 July 2015. On 17 May 2016, after retiring, he was presented as manager of the first team.

On 4 January 2018, Pèlach was presented as Peralada-Girona B manager, with the farm team of Girona playing in Segunda División B. On 6 June 2018, after leading the side to a ninth place finish, he renewed his contract until 2020.

In June 2019, after Peralada's relegation and their affiliation with Girona ended, Pèlach was named Juan Carlos Unzué's assistant at Girona's first team. In October, after Unzué was sacked and José Luis Martí was named the new manager, he and fellow assistant Juan Carlos Moreno were fired from the club.

On 24 July 2020, Pèlach moved abroad for the first time in his career and joined Carlos Corberán's staff at English club Huddersfield Town. He was appointed interim head coach in September 2022, winning his only game in charge, before Mark Fotheringham took over. Pèlach was again named interim manager of Huddersfield in February 2023, replacing Fotheringham. His spell lasted six days, as the club appointed Neil Warnock.

In May 2023, Pèlach joined Norwich City as a first-team coach.

In September 2024, Pèlach was linked in the media to the vacant Stoke City manager job, and was announced as Stoke's new head coach on 18 September 2024, signing a three-year contract. Pèlach was sacked on 27 December 2024 after only winning three of his 19 games in charge.

On 9 January 2025, Pèlach joined Premier League club West Ham United as first-team coach following the appointment of Graham Potter as head coach. Pèlach was sacked by West Ham on 27 September 2025, along with Potter and the rest of his backroom staff.

On 24 June 2026, Pèlach was appointed as the manager of Japanese club RB Omiya Ardija.

== Managerial statistics ==
As of match played 26 December 2024

Managerial record by team and tenure
Team	From	To	Record				
Team	From	To	P	W	D	L	Win %
Huddersfield Town (caretaker)	10 February 2023	15 February 2023 (Note: On 13 February 2023, Huddersfield Town announced that Neil Warnock would be returning as manager on 16 February 2023. Soccerbase uses the date of Neil Warnock's announcement as his start date in the job, so erroneously attributes the match played on 15 February (a 3-0 loss to Stoke City) to Warnock rather than to Pelach, who was manager for that match.)	2	0	0	2	0.00
Stoke City	18 September 2024	27 December 2024	19	3	7	9	15.79
RB Omiya Ardija	24 June 2026	Present	0	0	0	0	—
Total			21	3	7	11	14.29
