= List of Premier League managers =

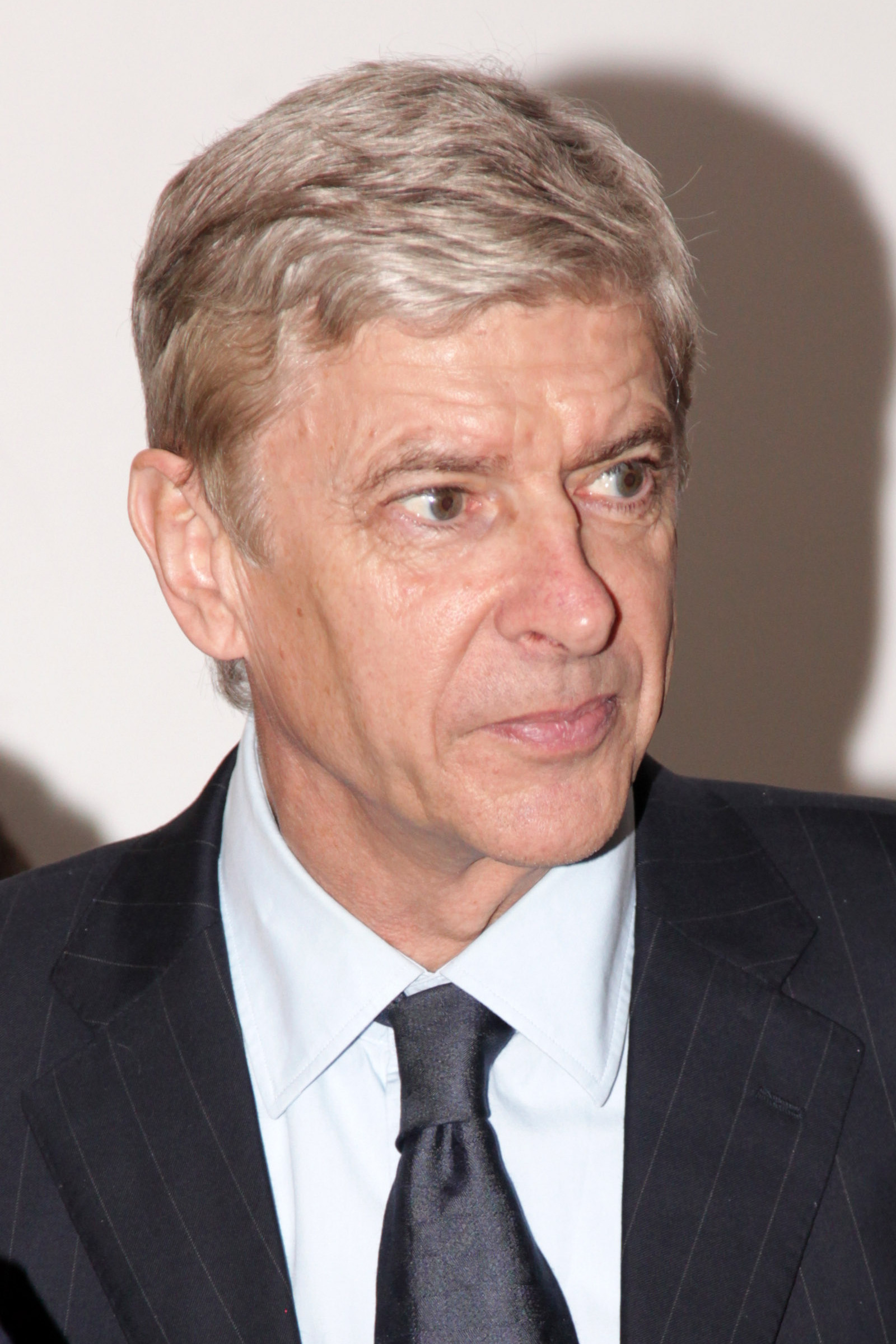
Former Arsenal manager Arsène Wenger has managed more Premier League games than any other manager.

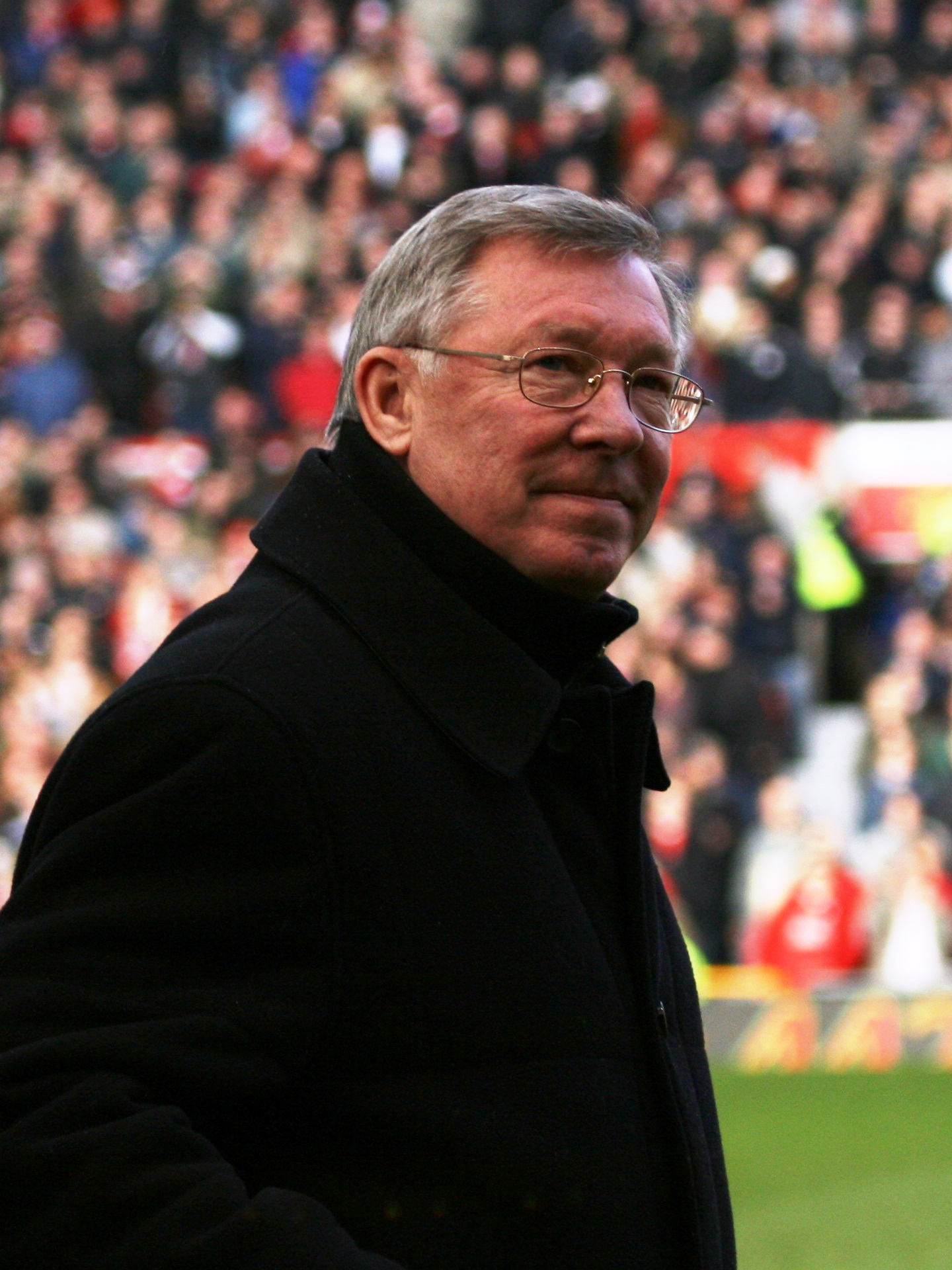
Former Manchester United manager Alex Ferguson has been the most successful manager in the Premier League.

The Premier League is the top tier of professional football in England. The league was formed in 1992 as a replacement for the original Football League First Division. To date, there have been 328 managers in charge of the 51 clubs which have played in the Premier League. 286 of those are permanent appointments, and 123 of them in a caretaker/interim capacity.

Arsène Wenger holds the record for most games managed in the Premier League with 828, all with Arsenal, which he managed between 1996 and 2018. Alex Ferguson won the most games, with 528 wins during his time as manager of Manchester United. Sam Allardyce has managed the most teams in the Premier League, having taken charge of nine different clubs: Bolton Wanderers, Newcastle United, Blackburn Rovers, West Ham United, Sunderland, Crystal Palace, Everton, West Bromwich Albion and Leeds United. The season with the highest number of managers was the 2022–23 season, with 39 managers.

Thirteen managers have won the Premier League since the competition's inception in 1992. The most successful manager is Ferguson, who won 13 titles – more than twice as many as any other manager – with Manchester United between 1993 and 2013. He's followed by Pep Guardiola, who won six titles between 2018 and 2024, followed by Wenger and Jose Mourinho with three each, as managers of Arsenal and Chelsea respectively. Mourinho is the youngest manager to win the Premier League, he was 42 years and 94 days old when he led Chelsea to the title in 2005. Mikel Arteta is the only Premier League manager to win a title with the club he previously played for as a player.

Many of the managers listed below served as caretaker managers in the period between a managerial departure and appointment. Several of these, however, went on to secure a permanent managerial post.

== Managers ==
The list of managers includes everyone who has managed clubs while they were in the Premier League, whether in a permanent or temporary role. Caretaker managers are listed only when they managed the team for at least one match in that period.

The dates of appointment and departure may fall outside the club's period in the Premier League, for example, Ron Atkinson was appointed as Aston Villa manager in 1991 (before the Premier League was formed in 1992) and remained in his position through the Premier League's establishment. Similarly, Wolverhampton Wanderers' first spell in the Premier League lasted for only one season (2003–04) but manager Dave Jones remained in his position until November 2004.

Key
†	Incumbent manager
‡	Caretaker manager
§	Incumbent but no longer in Premier League
Present*	up to date as of 18 November 2026

Managers
Name	Nat.	Club	From	Until	Duration (days)	Years in League	Ref.
George Graham	(Scotland)	Arsenal	14 May 1986	21 February 1995	3205	1992–1995	
Stewart Houston ‡	(Scotland)	Arsenal	22 February 1995	8 June 1995	106	1995	
Bruce Rioch	(Scotland)	Arsenal	8 June 1995	12 August 1996	431	1995–1996	
Stewart Houston ‡	(Scotland)	Arsenal	12 August 1996	13 September 1996	32	1996	
Pat Rice ‡	(Northern Ireland)	Arsenal	13 September 1996	30 September 1996	17	1996	
Arsène Wenger	(France)	Arsenal	1 October 1996	13 May 2018	7894	1996–2018	
Unai Emery	(Spain)	Arsenal	23 May 2018	29 November 2019	555	2018–2019	
Freddie Ljungberg ‡	(Sweden)	Arsenal	29 November 2019	21 December 2019	22	2019	
Mikel Arteta †	(Spain)	Arsenal	22 December 2019	Present*	2521	2019–	
Ron Atkinson	(England)	Aston Villa	7 June 1991	10 November 1994	1252	1992–1994	
Jim Barron ‡	(England)	Aston Villa	11 November 1994	24 November 1994	14	1994	
Brian Little	(England)	Aston Villa	25 November 1994	24 February 1998	1187	1994–1998	
John Gregory	(England)	Aston Villa	25 February 1998	24 January 2002	1429	1998–2002	
John Deehan ‡	(England)	Aston Villa	24 January 2002	5 February 2002	12	2002	
Stuart Gray ‡	(England)	Aston Villa	24 January 2002	5 February 2002	12	2002	
Graham Taylor	(England)	Aston Villa	5 February 2002	14 May 2003	463	2002–2003	
David O'Leary	(Republic of Ireland)	Aston Villa	20 May 2003	19 July 2006	1156	2003–2006	
Martin O'Neill	(Northern Ireland)	Aston Villa	5 August 2006	9 August 2010	1465	2006–2010	
Kevin MacDonald ‡	(Scotland)	Aston Villa	9 August 2010	8 September 2010	30	2010	
Gérard Houllier	(France)	Aston Villa	8 September 2010	1 June 2011	266	2010–2011	
Gary McAllister ‡	(Scotland)	Aston Villa	23 April 2011	22 May 2011	29	2011	
Alex McLeish	(Scotland)	Aston Villa	17 June 2011	14 May 2012	332	2011–2012	
Paul Lambert	(Scotland)	Aston Villa	2 June 2012	11 February 2015	985	2012–2015	
Scott Marshall ‡	(Scotland)	Aston Villa	11 February 2015	14 February 2015	3	2015	
Tim Sherwood	(England)	Aston Villa	14 February 2015	25 October 2015	253	2015	
Kevin MacDonald ‡	(Scotland)	Aston Villa	25 October 2015	2 November 2015	8	2015	
Rémi Garde	(France)	Aston Villa	2 November 2015	29 March 2016	148	2015–2016	
Eric Black ‡	(Scotland)	Aston Villa	30 March 2016	2 June 2016	65	2016	
Dean Smith	(England)	Aston Villa	10 October 2018	7 November 2021	1124	2019–2021	
Steven Gerrard	(England)	Aston Villa	11 November 2021	20 October 2022	343	2021–2022	
Aaron Danks ‡	(England)	Aston Villa	21 October 2022	31 October 2022	10	2022	
Unai Emery †	(Spain)	Aston Villa	24 October 2022	Present*	1484	2022–	
Danny Wilson	(Northern Ireland)	Barnsley	2 June 1994	7 July 1998	1496	1997–1998	
Steve Bruce	(England)	Birmingham City	12 December 2001	23 November 2007	2172	2002–2006; 2007	
Eric Black ‡	(Scotland)	Birmingham City	23 November 2007	27 November 2007	4	2007	
Alex McLeish	(Scotland)	Birmingham City	28 November 2007	12 June 2011	1496	2007–2008; 2009–2011	
Kenny Dalglish	(Scotland)	Blackburn Rovers	12 October 1991	21 June 1995	1348	1992–1995	
Ray Harford	(England)	Blackburn Rovers	25 June 1995	25 October 1996	488	1995–1996	
Tony Parkes	(England)	Blackburn Rovers	25 October 1996	1 June 1997	219	1996–1997	
Roy Hodgson	(England)	Blackburn Rovers	1 June 1997	21 November 1998	538	1997	
Brian Kidd	(England)	Blackburn Rovers	4 December 1998	3 November 1999	334	1998–1999	
Graeme Souness	(Scotland)	Blackburn Rovers	14 March 2000	6 September 2004	1637	2001–2004	
Mark Hughes	(Wales)	Blackburn Rovers	15 September 2004	3 June 2008	1357	2004–2008	
Paul Ince	(England)	Blackburn Rovers	22 June 2008	16 December 2008	177	2008	
Sam Allardyce	(England)	Blackburn Rovers	17 December 2008	13 December 2010	726	2008–2010	
Steve Kean	(Scotland)	Blackburn Rovers	13 December 2010	28 September 2012	655	2010–2012	
Ian Holloway	(England)	Blackpool	21 May 2009	3 November 2012	1262	2010–2011	
Roy McFarland	(England)	Bolton Wanderers	20 June 1995	2 January 1996	227	1995–1996	
Colin Todd	(England)	Bolton Wanderers	2 January 1996	22 September 1999	1328	1996; 1997–1998	
Sam Allardyce	(England)	Bolton Wanderers	19 October 1999	29 April 2007	2749	2001–2007	
Sammy Lee	(England)	Bolton Wanderers	30 April 2007	7 October 2007	160	2007	
Archie Knox ‡	(Scotland)	Bolton Wanderers	17 October 2007	25 October 2007	8	2007	
Gary Megson	(England)	Bolton Wanderers	25 October 2007	30 December 2009	797	2007–2009	
Owen Coyle	(Republic of Ireland)	Bolton Wanderers	8 January 2010	9 October 2012	1005	2010–2012	
Eddie Howe	(England)	Bournemouth	12 October 2012	1 August 2020	2850	2015–2020	
Scott Parker	(England)	Bournemouth	28 June 2021	30 August 2022	428	2022	
Gary O'Neil	(England)	Bournemouth	30 August 2022 (Note: O'Neil served as caretaker manager until 27 November 2022, when he was given a long-term appointment.)	19 June 2023	293	2022–2023	
Andoni Iraola	(Spain)	Bournemouth	19 June 2023	24 May 2026	1070	2023–2026	
Marco Rose †	(Germany)	Bournemouth	1 June 2026	Present*	168	2026–	
Paul Jewell	(England)	Bradford City	6 January 1998	18 June 2000	894	1999–2000	
Chris Hutchings	(England)	Bradford City	18 June 2000	6 November 2000	141	2000	
Stuart McCall ‡	(Scotland)	Bradford City	6 November 2000	20 November 2000	14	2000	
Jim Jefferies	(Scotland)	Bradford City	20 November 2000	24 December 2001	399	2000–2001	
Thomas Frank	(Denmark)	Brentford	16 October 2018	12 June 2025	2431	2021–2025	
Keith Andrews †	(Republic of Ireland)	Brentford	27 June 2025	Present*	507	2025–	
Chris Hughton	(Republic of Ireland)	Brighton & Hove Albion	31 December 2014	13 May 2019	1594	2017–2019	
Graham Potter	(England)	Brighton & Hove Albion	20 May 2019	8 September 2022	1207	2019–2022	
Roberto De Zerbi	(Italy)	Brighton & Hove Albion	18 September 2022 (Note: Andrew Crofts took charge of Brighton & Hove Albion for ten days, however no fixtures were played in this time.)	19 May 2024	1520	2022–2024	
Fabian Hürzeler †	(Germany)	Brighton & Hove Albion	2 July 2024	Present*	867	2024–	
Owen Coyle	(Republic of Ireland)	Burnley	27 November 2007	5 January 2010	770	2009–2010	
Brian Laws	(England)	Burnley	13 January 2010	29 December 2010	350	2010	
Sean Dyche	(England)	Burnley	30 October 2012	15 April 2022	3454	2014–2015; 2016–2022	
Mike Jackson ‡	(England)	Burnley	15 April 2022	22 May 2022	37	2022	
Vincent Kompany	(Belgium)	Burnley	14 June 2022	29 May 2024	715	2023–2024	
Scott Parker	(England)	Burnley	5 July 2024	30 April 2026	664	2025–2026	
Mike Jackson ‡	(England)	Burnley	30 April 2026	24 May 2026	24	2026	
Malky Mackay	(Scotland)	Cardiff City	17 June 2011	27 December 2013	924	2013	
David Kerslake ‡	(England)	Cardiff City	27 December 2013	2 January 2014	6	2013–2014	
Ole Gunnar Solskjær	(Norway)	Cardiff City	2 January 2014	18 September 2014	259	2014	
Neil Warnock	(England)	Cardiff City	5 October 2016	11 November 2019	1132	2018–2019	
Alan Curbishley	(England)	Charlton Athletic	24 July 1991	8 May 2006	5402	1998–1999; 2000–2006	
Iain Dowie	(Northern Ireland)	Charlton Athletic	30 May 2006	13 November 2006	167	2006	
Les Reed	(England)	Charlton Athletic	14 November 2006	24 December 2006	40	2006	
Alan Pardew	(England)	Charlton Athletic	24 December 2006	22 November 2008	699	2006–2007	
Ian Porterfield	(Scotland)	Chelsea	11 June 1991	15 February 1993	615	1992–1993	
David Webb ‡	(England)	Chelsea	15 February 1993	11 May 1993	85	1993	
Glenn Hoddle	(England)	Chelsea	4 June 1993	10 May 1996	1071	1993–1996	
Ruud Gullit	(Netherlands)	Chelsea	10 May 1996	12 February 1998	643	1996–1998	
Gianluca Vialli	(Italy)	Chelsea	12 February 1998	12 September 2000	943	1998–2000	
Graham Rix ‡	(England)	Chelsea	13 September 2000	17 September 2000	4	2000	
Ray Wilkins ‡	(England)	Chelsea	13 September 2000	17 September 2000	4	2000	
Claudio Ranieri	(Italy)	Chelsea	18 September 2000	31 May 2004	1351	2000–2004	
José Mourinho	(Portugal)	Chelsea	2 June 2004	20 September 2007	1205	2004–2007	
Avram Grant	(Israel)	Chelsea	20 September 2007	24 May 2008	238	2007–2008	
Luiz Felipe Scolari	(Brazil)	Chelsea	1 July 2008	9 February 2009	223	2008–2009	
Ray Wilkins ‡	(England)	Chelsea	9 February 2009	16 February 2009	7	2009	
Guus Hiddink ‡	(Netherlands)	Chelsea	16 February 2009	31 May 2009	104	2009	
Carlo Ancelotti	(Italy)	Chelsea	1 July 2009	22 May 2011	720	2009–2011	
André Villas-Boas	(Portugal)	Chelsea	22 June 2011	4 March 2012	256	2011–2012	
Roberto Di Matteo	(Italy)	Chelsea	4 March 2012	21 November 2012	262	2012	
Rafael Benítez ‡	(Spain)	Chelsea	21 November 2012	27 May 2013	187	2012–2013	
José Mourinho	(Portugal)	Chelsea	3 June 2013	17 December 2015	927	2013–2015	
Steve Holland ‡	(England)	Chelsea	17 December 2015	19 December 2015	2	2015	
Guus Hiddink ‡	(Netherlands)	Chelsea	19 December 2015	15 May 2016	148	2015–2016	
Antonio Conte	(Italy)	Chelsea	3 July 2016	13 July 2018	740	2016–2018	
Maurizio Sarri	(Italy)	Chelsea	14 July 2018	16 June 2019	337	2018–2019	
Frank Lampard	(England)	Chelsea	4 July 2019	25 January 2021	571	2019–2021	
Thomas Tuchel	(Germany)	Chelsea	26 January 2021	7 September 2022	588	2021–2022	
Graham Potter	(England)	Chelsea	8 September 2022	2 April 2023	206	2022–2023	
Bruno Saltor ‡	(Spain)	Chelsea	2 April 2023	6 April 2023	4	2023	
Frank Lampard ‡	(England)	Chelsea	6 April 2023	28 May 2023	52	2023	
Mauricio Pochettino	(Argentina)	Chelsea	1 July 2023	21 May 2024	325	2023–2024	
Enzo Maresca	(Italy)	Chelsea	1 July 2024	1 January 2026	549	2024–2026	
Calum McFarlane ‡	(England)	Chelsea	1 January 2026	8 January 2026	7	2026	
Liam Rosenior	(England)	Chelsea	8 January 2026	22 April 2026	104	2026	
Calum McFarlane ‡	(England)	Chelsea	22 April 2026	1 June 2026	40	2026	
Xabi Alonso †	(Spain)	Chelsea	1 July 2026	Present*	138	2026–	
Bobby Gould	(England)	Coventry City	24 June 1992	23 October 1993	486	1992–1993	
Phil Neal	(England)	Coventry City	23 October 1993	14 February 1995	479	1993–1995	
Ron Atkinson	(England)	Coventry City	15 February 1995	5 November 1996	629	1995–1996	
Gordon Strachan	(Scotland)	Coventry City	5 November 1996	10 September 2001	1770	1996–2001	
Frank Lampard †	(England)	Coventry City	28 November 2024	Present*	718	2026–	
Steve Coppell	(England)	Crystal Palace	3 June 1984	17 May 1993	3270	1992–1993	
Alan Smith	(England)	Crystal Palace	3 June 1993	15 May 1995	711	1994–1995	
Steve Coppell	(England)	Crystal Palace	27 February 1997	13 March 1998	379	1997–1998	
Attilio Lombardo ‡	(Italy)	Crystal Palace	13 March 1998	29 April 1998	47	1998	
Tomas Brolin ‡	(Sweden)	Crystal Palace	13 March 1998	29 April 1998	47	1998	
Ron Noades ‡	(England)	Crystal Palace	29 April 1998	10 May 1998	11	1998	
Ray Lewington ‡	(England)	Crystal Palace	29 April 1998	10 May 1998	11	1998	
Iain Dowie	(Northern Ireland)	Crystal Palace	22 December 2003	22 May 2006	882	2004–2005	
Ian Holloway	(England)	Crystal Palace	3 November 2012	23 October 2013	354	2013	
Keith Millen ‡	(England)	Crystal Palace	23 October 2013	23 November 2013	31	2013	
Tony Pulis	(Wales)	Crystal Palace	23 November 2013	14 August 2014	264	2013–2014	
Keith Millen ‡	(England)	Crystal Palace	14 August 2014	27 August 2014	13	2014	
Neil Warnock	(England)	Crystal Palace	27 August 2014	27 December 2014	122	2014	
Keith Millen ‡	(England)	Crystal Palace	27 December 2014	2 January 2015	5	2014–2015	
Alan Pardew	(England)	Crystal Palace	2 January 2015	22 December 2016	720	2015–2016	
Sam Allardyce	(England)	Crystal Palace	23 December 2016	23 May 2017	151	2016–2017	
Frank de Boer	(Netherlands)	Crystal Palace	26 June 2017	11 September 2017	77	2017	
Roy Hodgson	(England)	Crystal Palace	12 September 2017	24 May 2021	1350	2017–2021	
Patrick Vieira	(France)	Crystal Palace	4 July 2021	17 March 2023	621	2021–2023	
Paddy McCarthy ‡	(Republic of Ireland)	Crystal Palace	17 March 2023	21 March 2023	4	2023	
Roy Hodgson	(England)	Crystal Palace	21 March 2023	19 February 2024	335	2023–2024	
Paddy McCarthy ‡	(Republic of Ireland)	Crystal Palace	19 February 2024	19 February 2024	0	2024	
Oliver Glasner	(Austria)	Crystal Palace	19 February 2024	27 May 2026	829	2024–2026	
Pierre Sage	(France)	Crystal Palace	15 June 2026	12 November 2026	150	2026	
Thomas Frank †	(Denmark)	Crystal Palace	16 November 2026	Present*	0	2026–	
Jim Smith	(England)	Derby County	15 June 1995	7 October 2001	2306	1996–2001	
Colin Todd	(England)	Derby County	8 October 2001	14 January 2002	98	2001–2002	
Billy McEwan ‡	(Scotland)	Derby County	14 January 2002	30 January 2002	16	2002	
John Gregory	(England)	Derby County	30 January 2002	21 March 2003	415	2002	
Billy Davies	(Scotland)	Derby County	2 June 2006	26 November 2007	542	2007	
Paul Jewell	(England)	Derby County	28 November 2007	29 December 2008	397	2007–2008	
Howard Kendall	(England)	Everton	5 November 1990	4 December 1993	1125	1992–1993	
Jimmy Gabriel ‡	(Scotland)	Everton	4 December 1993	7 January 1994	35	1993–1994	
Mike Walker	(Wales)	Everton	7 January 1994	8 November 1994	305	1994	
Joe Royle	(England)	Everton	10 November 1994	27 March 1997	868	1994–1997	
Dave Watson ‡	(England)	Everton	1 April 1997	31 May 1997	60	1997	
Howard Kendall	(England)	Everton	27 June 1997	25 June 1998	363	1997–1998	
Walter Smith	(Scotland)	Everton	1 July 1998	13 March 2002	1351	1998–2002	
David Moyes	(Scotland)	Everton	15 March 2002	1 June 2013	4096	2002–2013	
Roberto Martínez	(Spain)	Everton	5 June 2013	12 May 2016	1072	2013–2016	
David Unsworth ‡	(England)	Everton	12 May 2016	14 June 2016	33	2016	
Ronald Koeman	(Netherlands)	Everton	14 June 2016	23 October 2017	496	2016–2017	
David Unsworth ‡	(England)	Everton	23 October 2017	30 November 2017	38	2017	
Sam Allardyce	(England)	Everton	30 November 2017	16 May 2018	167	2017–2018	
Marco Silva	(Portugal)	Everton	31 May 2018	5 December 2019	553	2018–2019	
Duncan Ferguson ‡	(Scotland)	Everton	5 December 2019	21 December 2019	16	2019	
Carlo Ancelotti	(Italy)	Everton	22 December 2019	1 June 2021	527	2019–2021	
Rafael Benítez	(Spain)	Everton	30 June 2021	16 January 2022	200	2021–2022	
Duncan Ferguson ‡	(Scotland)	Everton	18 January 2022	31 January 2022	13	2022	
Frank Lampard	(England)	Everton	31 January 2022	23 January 2023	357	2022–2023	
Sean Dyche	(England)	Everton	30 January 2023	9 January 2025	710	2023–2025	
Leighton Baines ‡	(England)	Everton	9 January 2025	11 January 2025	2	2025	
David Moyes †	(Scotland)	Everton	11 January 2025	Present*	674	2025–	
Jean Tigana	(France)	Fulham	1 July 2000	17 April 2003	1020	2001–2003	
Chris Coleman	(Wales)	Fulham	17 April 2003	11 April 2007	1455	2003–2007	
Lawrie Sanchez	(Northern Ireland)	Fulham	11 April 2007	21 December 2007	254	2007	
Ray Lewington ‡	(England)	Fulham	21 December 2007	30 December 2007	9	2007	
Roy Hodgson	(England)	Fulham	30 December 2007	30 June 2010	913	2007–2010	
Ray Lewington ‡	(England)	Fulham	1 July 2010	29 July 2010	28	2010	
Mark Hughes	(Wales)	Fulham	29 July 2010	1 June 2011	307	2010–2011	
Martin Jol	(Netherlands)	Fulham	7 June 2011	1 December 2013	908	2011–2013	
René Meulensteen	(Netherlands)	Fulham	1 December 2013	14 February 2014	75	2013–2014	
Felix Magath	(Germany)	Fulham	14 February 2014	18 September 2014	216	2014	
Slaviša Jokanović	(Serbia)	Fulham	27 December 2015	14 November 2018	1052	2018	
Claudio Ranieri	(Italy)	Fulham	14 November 2018	28 February 2019	106	2018–2019	
Scott Parker	(England)	Fulham	28 February 2019 (Note: Parker served as caretaker manager until 10 May 2019, when he was given a long-term appointment.)	28 June 2021	851	2019; 2020–2021	
Marco Silva	(Portugal)	Fulham	1 July 2021	2 June 2026	1797	2022–2026	
Álvaro Arbeloa †	(Spain)	Fulham	7 July 2026	Present*	132	2026–	
David Wagner	(United States)	Huddersfield Town	9 November 2015	14 January 2019	1162	2017–2019	
Mark Hudson ‡	(England)	Huddersfield Town	14 January 2019	21 January 2019	7	2019	
Jan Siewert	(Germany)	Huddersfield Town	21 January 2019	16 August 2019	207	2019	
Phil Brown	(England)	Hull City	4 December 2006	15 March 2010	1197	2008–2009	
Iain Dowie	(Northern Ireland)	Hull City	17 March 2010 (Note: Brian Horton and Steve Ashton took charge of Hull for two days, however no fixtures were played in this time.)	9 May 2010	53	2010	
Steve Bruce	(England)	Hull City	8 June 2012	22 July 2016	1505	2013–2015	
Mike Phelan	(England)	Hull City	22 July 2016 (Note: Phelan served as caretaker manager until 13 October 2016, when he was given a long-term appointment.)	3 January 2017	165	2016–2017	
Marco Silva	(Portugal)	Hull City	5 January 2017	25 May 2017	140	2017	
Sergej Jakirović †	(Bosnia and Herzegovina)	Hull City	11 June 2025	Present*	523	2026–	
John Lyall	(England)	Ipswich Town	11 May 1990	5 December 1994	1669	1992–1994	
Paul Goddard ‡	(England)	Ipswich Town	6 December 1994	27 December 1994	21	1994	
John Wark ‡	(Scotland)	Ipswich Town	6 December 1994	27 December 1994	21	1994	
George Burley	(Scotland)	Ipswich Town	28 December 1994	11 October 2002	2844	1994–1995; 2000–2002	
Kieran McKenna	(Northern Ireland)	Ipswich Town	16 December 2021	10 June 2026	1637	2024–2025	
Gary O'Neil †	(England)	Ipswich Town	23 June 2026	Present*	146	2026–	
Howard Wilkinson	(England)	Leeds United	10 October 1988	10 September 1996	2892	1992–1996	
George Graham	(Scotland)	Leeds United	10 September 1996	1 October 1998	751	1996–1998	
David O'Leary	(Republic of Ireland)	Leeds United	1 October 1998	27 June 2002	1365	1998–2002	
Terry Venables	(England)	Leeds United	8 July 2002	21 March 2003	256	2002–2003	
Peter Reid	(England)	Leeds United	21 March 2003	10 November 2003	234	2003	
Eddie Gray ‡	(Scotland)	Leeds United	10 November 2003	21 May 2004	193	2003–2004	
Marcelo Bielsa	(Argentina)	Leeds United	15 June 2018	27 February 2022	1353	2020–2022	
Jesse Marsch	(United States)	Leeds United	28 February 2022	6 February 2023	343	2022–2023	
Michael Skubala ‡	(England)	Leeds United	6 February 2023	21 February 2023	15	2023	
Javi Gracia	(Spain)	Leeds United	21 February 2023	3 May 2023	71	2023	
Sam Allardyce	(England)	Leeds United	3 May 2023	2 June 2023	30	2023	
Daniel Farke †	(Germany)	Leeds United	4 July 2023	Present*	1231	2025–	
Brian Little	(England)	Leicester City	30 May 1991	22 November 1994	1272	1994–1995	
Kevin MacDonald ‡	(Scotland)	Leicester City	22 November 1994	14 December 1994	22	1994	
Mark McGhee	(Scotland)	Leicester City	14 December 1994	7 December 1995	358	1994–1995	
Martin O'Neill	(Northern Ireland)	Leicester City	21 December 1995	1 June 2000	1624	1996–2000	
Peter Taylor	(England)	Leicester City	12 June 2000	30 September 2001	475	2000–2001	
Dave Bassett	(England)	Leicester City	10 October 2001	6 April 2002	178	2001–2002	
Micky Adams	(England)	Leicester City	7 April 2002	11 October 2004	918	2002; 2003–2004	
Nigel Pearson	(England)	Leicester City	15 November 2011	30 June 2015	1323	2014–2015	
Claudio Ranieri	(Italy)	Leicester City	13 July 2015	23 February 2017	591	2015–2017	
Craig Shakespeare	(England)	Leicester City	23 February 2017 (Note: Shakespeare served as caretaker manager until 12 March 2017, when he was given a long-term appointment.)	17 October 2017	236	2017	
Michael Appleton ‡	(England)	Leicester City	17 October 2017	25 October 2017	8	2017	
Claude Puel	(France)	Leicester City	25 October 2017	24 February 2019	487	2017–2019	
Adam Sadler ‡	(England)	Leicester City	24 February 2019	26 February 2019	2	2019	
Mike Stowell ‡	(England)	Leicester City	24 February 2019	26 February 2019	2	2019	
Brendan Rodgers	(Northern Ireland)	Leicester City	27 February 2019	2 April 2023	1495	2019–2023	
Adam Sadler ‡	(England)	Leicester City	2 April 2023	10 April 2023	8	2023	
Mike Stowell ‡	(England)	Leicester City	2 April 2023	10 April 2023	8	2023	
Dean Smith	(England)	Leicester City	10 April 2023	16 June 2023	67	2023	
Steve Cooper	(Wales)	Leicester City	20 June 2024	24 November 2024	157	2024	
Ben Dawson ‡	(England)	Leicester City	24 November 2024	1 December 2024	7	2024	
Ruud van Nistelrooy	(Netherlands)	Leicester City	1 December 2024	27 June 2025	208	2024–2025	
Graeme Souness	(Scotland)	Liverpool	16 April 1991	28 January 1994	1018	1992–1994	
Roy Evans	(England)	Liverpool	28 January 1994	12 November 1998	1749	1994–1998	
Gérard Houllier	(France)	Liverpool	1 July 1998	14 October 2001	1201	1998–2001	
Phil Thompson ‡	(England)	Liverpool	14 October 2001	16 March 2002	153	2001–2002	
Gérard Houllier	(France)	Liverpool	17 March 2002	24 May 2004	799	2002–2004	
Rafael Benítez	(Spain)	Liverpool	16 June 2004	3 June 2010	2178	2004–2010	
Roy Hodgson	(England)	Liverpool	1 July 2010	8 January 2011	191	2010–2011	
Kenny Dalglish	(Scotland)	Liverpool	8 January 2011	16 May 2012	494	2011–2012	
Brendan Rodgers	(Northern Ireland)	Liverpool	1 June 2012	4 October 2015	1220	2012–2015	
Jürgen Klopp	(Germany)	Liverpool	8 October 2015	19 May 2024	3146	2015–2024	
Arne Slot	(Netherlands)	Liverpool	1 June 2024	30 May 2026	728	2024–2026	
Andoni Iraola †	(Spain)	Liverpool	4 June 2026	Present*	165	2026–	
Rob Edwards	(Wales)	Luton Town	17 November 2022	9 January 2025	784	2023–2024	
Peter Reid	(England)	Manchester City	11 November 1990	26 August 1993	1019	1992–1993	
Tony Book ‡	(England)	Manchester City	26 August 1993	28 August 1993	2	1993	
Brian Horton	(England)	Manchester City	28 August 1993	16 May 1995	626	1993–1995	
Alan Ball	(England)	Manchester City	30 June 1995	26 August 1996	423	1995–1996	
Joe Royle	(England)	Manchester City	18 February 1998	21 May 2001	1188	2000–2001	
Kevin Keegan	(England)	Manchester City	24 May 2001	11 March 2005	1387	2002–2005	
Stuart Pearce	(England)	Manchester City	21 March 2005	14 May 2007	784	2005–2007	
Sven-Göran Eriksson	(Sweden)	Manchester City	6 July 2007	2 June 2008	332	2007–2008	
Mark Hughes	(Wales)	Manchester City	4 June 2008	19 December 2009	563	2008–2009	
Roberto Mancini	(Italy)	Manchester City	19 December 2009	13 May 2013	1241	2009–2013	
Brian Kidd ‡	(England)	Manchester City	13 May 2013	14 June 2013	32	2013	
Manuel Pellegrini	(Chile)	Manchester City	14 June 2013	30 June 2016	1112	2013–2016	
Pep Guardiola	(Spain)	Manchester City	1 July 2016	24 May 2026	3614	2016–2026	
Enzo Maresca †	(Italy)	Manchester City	29 June 2026	Present*	140	2026–	
Alex Ferguson	(Scotland)	Manchester United	6 November 1986	1 June 2013	9704	1992–2013	
David Moyes	(Scotland)	Manchester United	1 July 2013	22 April 2014	325	2013–2014	
Ryan Giggs ‡	(Wales)	Manchester United	22 April 2014	11 May 2014	19	2014	
Louis van Gaal	(Netherlands)	Manchester United	14 July 2014	23 May 2016	679	2014–2016	
José Mourinho	(Portugal)	Manchester United	27 May 2016	18 December 2018	935	2016–2018	
Ole Gunnar Solskjær	(Norway)	Manchester United	19 December 2018 (Note: Solskjær served as caretaker manager until 28 March 2019, when he was given a long-term appointment.)	21 November 2021	1068	2018–2021	
Michael Carrick ‡	(England)	Manchester United	21 November 2021	2 December 2021	11	2021	
Ralf Rangnick ‡	(Germany)	Manchester United	3 December 2021	22 May 2022	170	2021–2022	
Erik ten Hag	(Netherlands)	Manchester United	1 June 2022	28 October 2024	880	2022–2024	
Ruud van Nistelrooy ‡	(Netherlands)	Manchester United	28 October 2024	11 November 2024	14	2024	
Ruben Amorim	(Portugal)	Manchester United	11 November 2024	5 January 2026	420	2024–2026	
Darren Fletcher ‡	(Scotland)	Manchester United	5 January 2026	13 January 2026	8	2026	
Michael Carrick	(England)	Manchester United	13 January 2026	12 November 2026	303	2026–2026	
Mauricio Pochettino †	(Argentina)	Manchester United	18 November 2026	Present*	−2	2026–	
Lennie Lawrence	(England)	Middlesbrough	10 July 1991	19 May 1994	1044	1992–1993	
Bryan Robson	(England)	Middlesbrough	31 May 1994	6 December 2000	2381	1995–1997; 1998–2000	
Terry Venables	(England)	Middlesbrough	6 December 2000	12 June 2001	188	2000–2001	
Steve McClaren	(England)	Middlesbrough	12 June 2001	11 May 2006	1794	2001–2006	
Gareth Southgate	(England)	Middlesbrough	7 June 2006	20 October 2009	1231	2006–2009	
Aitor Karanka	(Spain)	Middlesbrough	13 November 2013	16 March 2017	1219	2016–2017	
Steve Agnew ‡	(England)	Middlesbrough	16 March 2017	9 June 2017	85	2017	
Kevin Keegan	(England)	Newcastle United	5 February 1992	8 January 1997	1799	1993–1997	
Terry McDermott ‡	(England)	Newcastle United	8 January 1997	14 January 1997	6	1997	
Kenny Dalglish	(Scotland)	Newcastle United	14 January 1997	27 August 1998	590	1997–1998	
Ruud Gullit	(Netherlands)	Newcastle United	28 August 1998	28 August 1999	365	1998–1999	
Steve Clarke ‡	(Scotland)	Newcastle United	28 August 1999	2 September 1999	5	1999	
Bobby Robson	(England)	Newcastle United	2 September 1999	30 August 2004	1824	1999–2004	
John Carver ‡	(England)	Newcastle United	11 September 2004	13 September 2004	2	2004	
Graeme Souness	(Scotland)	Newcastle United	13 September 2004	2 February 2006	507	2004–2006	
Glenn Roeder	(England)	Newcastle United	2 February 2006	6 May 2007	458	2006–2007	
Nigel Pearson ‡	(England)	Newcastle United	6 May 2007	15 May 2007	9	2007	
Sam Allardyce	(England)	Newcastle United	15 May 2007	9 January 2008	239	2007–2008	
Nigel Pearson ‡	(England)	Newcastle United	9 January 2008	16 January 2008	7	2008	
Kevin Keegan	(England)	Newcastle United	16 January 2008	4 September 2008	232	2008	
Chris Hughton ‡	(Republic of Ireland)	Newcastle United	8 September 2008	28 September 2008	20	2008	
Joe Kinnear	(Republic of Ireland)	Newcastle United	29 September 2008	1 April 2009	184	2008–2009	
Alan Shearer	(England)	Newcastle United	1 April 2009	24 May 2009	53	2009	
Chris Hughton	(Republic of Ireland)	Newcastle United	1 June 2009	6 December 2010	553	2010	
Alan Pardew	(England)	Newcastle United	9 December 2010	2 January 2015	1484	2010–2015	
John Carver	(England)	Newcastle United	2 January 2015 (Note: Carver served as caretaker manager until 26 January 2015, when he was given a long-term appointment.)	10 June 2015	159	2015	
Steve McClaren	(England)	Newcastle United	10 June 2015	11 March 2016	275	2015–2016	
Rafael Benítez	(Spain)	Newcastle United	11 March 2016	30 June 2019	1206	2016; 2017–2019	
Steve Bruce	(England)	Newcastle United	17 July 2019	20 October 2021	826	2019–2021	
Graeme Jones ‡	(England)	Newcastle United	20 October 2021	8 November 2021	19	2021	
Eddie Howe	(England)	Newcastle United	8 November 2021	30 July 2026	1725	2021–2026	
Matthias Jaissle †	(Germany)	Newcastle United	5 August 2026	Present*	103	2026–	
Mike Walker	(Wales)	Norwich City	1 June 1992	6 January 1994	584	1992–1994	
John Deehan	(England)	Norwich City	12 January 1994	31 July 1995	565	1994–1995	
Nigel Worthington	(Northern Ireland)	Norwich City	4 December 2000	2 October 2006	2128	2004–2005	
Paul Lambert	(Scotland)	Norwich City	18 August 2009	2 June 2012	1019	2011–2012	
Chris Hughton	(Republic of Ireland)	Norwich City	7 June 2012	6 April 2014	668	2012–2014	
Neil Adams	(England)	Norwich City	6 April 2014	5 January 2015	213	2014	
Alex Neil	(Scotland)	Norwich City	9 January 2015	10 March 2017	791	2015–2016	
Daniel Farke	(Germany)	Norwich City	25 May 2017	6 November 2021	1626	2019–2020; 2021	
Dean Smith	(England)	Norwich City	15 November 2021	27 December 2022	407	2021–2022	
Brian Clough	(England)	Nottingham Forest	6 January 1975	8 May 1993	6697	1992–1993	
Frank Clark	(England)	Nottingham Forest	12 May 1993	19 December 1996	1317	1994–1996	
Stuart Pearce ‡	(England)	Nottingham Forest	20 December 1996	8 May 1997	139	1996–1997	
Dave Bassett	(England)	Nottingham Forest	8 May 1997	5 January 1999	607	1997; 1998–1999	
Micky Adams ‡	(England)	Nottingham Forest	5 January 1999	11 January 1999	6	1999	
Ron Atkinson	(England)	Nottingham Forest	11 January 1999	16 May 1999	125	1999	
Steve Cooper	(Wales)	Nottingham Forest	21 September 2021	19 December 2023	819	2022–2023	
Nuno Espírito Santo	(Portugal)	Nottingham Forest	20 December 2023	9 September 2025	629	2023–2025	
Ange Postecoglou	(Australia)	Nottingham Forest	9 September 2025	18 October 2025	39	2025	
Sean Dyche	(England)	Nottingham Forest	21 October 2025	12 February 2026	114	2025–2026	
Vítor Pereira	(Portugal)	Nottingham Forest	15 February 2026	2 July 2026	137	2026	
Oliver Glasner †	(Austria)	Nottingham Forest	6 July 2026	Present*	133	2026–	
Joe Royle	(England)	Oldham Athletic	14 July 1982	10 November 1994	4502	1982–1994	
Harry Redknapp	(England)	Portsmouth	25 March 2002	24 November 2004	975	2003–2004	
Velimir Zajec	(Croatia)	Portsmouth	24 December 2004	7 April 2005	104	2004–2005	
Alain Perrin	(France)	Portsmouth	7 April 2005	24 November 2005	231	2005	
Joe Jordan ‡	(Scotland)	Portsmouth	24 November 2005	7 December 2005	13	2005	
Harry Redknapp	(England)	Portsmouth	7 December 2005	25 October 2008	1053	2005–2008	
Joe Jordan ‡	(Scotland)	Portsmouth	25 October 2008	28 October 2008	3	2008	
Tony Adams	(England)	Portsmouth	25 October 2008	9 February 2009	107	2008–2009	
Paul Hart	(England)	Portsmouth	9 February 2009	24 November 2009	288	2009	
Avram Grant	(Israel)	Portsmouth	26 November 2009	21 May 2010	176	2009–2010	
Gerry Francis	(England)	Queens Park Rangers	1 June 1991	11 November 1994	1259	1992–1994	
Ray Wilkins	(England)	Queens Park Rangers	15 November 1994	4 September 1996	659	1994–1996	
Neil Warnock	(England)	Queens Park Rangers	1 March 2010	8 January 2012	678	2011–2012	
Mark Hughes	(Wales)	Queens Park Rangers	10 January 2012	23 November 2012	318	2012	
Mark Bowen ‡	(Wales)	Queens Park Rangers	23 November 2012	24 November 2012	1	2012	
Harry Redknapp	(England)	Queens Park Rangers	24 November 2012	3 February 2015	802	2012–2013; 2014–2015	
Kevin Bond ‡	(England)	Queens Park Rangers	3 February 2015	12 February 2015	9	2015	
Chris Ramsey	(England)	Queens Park Rangers	3 February 2015 (Note: Ramsey served as caretaker manager until 12 February 2015, when he was given a long-term appointment.)	4 November 2015	274	2015	
Steve Coppell	(England)	Reading	9 October 2003	12 May 2009	2042	2006–2008	
Brian McDermott	(England)	Reading	17 December 2009	11 March 2013	1180	2012–2013	
Nigel Adkins	(England)	Reading	26 March 2013	15 December 2014	629	2013	
Dave Bassett	(England)	Sheffield United	2 January 1988	12 December 1995	2901	1992–1994	
Neil Warnock	(England)	Sheffield United	2 December 1999	16 May 2007	2722	2006–2007	
Chris Wilder	(England)	Sheffield United	12 May 2016	13 March 2021	1766	2019–2021	
Paul Heckingbottom ‡	(England)	Sheffield United	13 March 2021	27 May 2021	75	2021	
Paul Heckingbottom	(England)	Sheffield United	25 November 2021	5 December 2023	740	2023	
Chris Wilder	(England)	Sheffield United	5 December 2023	18 June 2025	561	2023–2024	
Trevor Francis	(England)	Sheffield Wednesday	7 June 1991	20 May 1995	1443	1992–1995	
David Pleat	(England)	Sheffield Wednesday	14 June 1995	3 November 1997	873	1995–1997	
Peter Shreeves ‡	(Wales)	Sheffield Wednesday	3 November 1997	14 November 1997	11	1997	
Ron Atkinson	(England)	Sheffield Wednesday	14 November 1997	17 May 1998	184	1997–1998	
Danny Wilson	(Northern Ireland)	Sheffield Wednesday	6 July 1998	21 March 2000	624	1998–2000	
Peter Shreeves ‡	(Wales)	Sheffield Wednesday	21 March 2000	21 June 2000	92	2000	
Ian Branfoot	(England)	Southampton	11 June 1991	10 January 1994	944	1992–1994	
Alan Ball	(England)	Southampton	20 January 1994	2 July 1995	528	1994–1995	
Dave Merrington	(England)	Southampton	14 July 1995	14 June 1996	336	1995–1996	
Graeme Souness	(Scotland)	Southampton	3 July 1996	1 June 1997	333	1996–1997	
Dave Jones	(England)	Southampton	23 June 1997	27 January 2000	948	1997–2000	
Glenn Hoddle	(England)	Southampton	28 January 2000	28 March 2001	425	2000–2001	
Stuart Gray	(England)	Southampton	30 March 2001	21 October 2001	205	2001	
Gordon Strachan	(Scotland)	Southampton	22 October 2001	13 February 2004	844	2001–2004	
Steve Wigley ‡	(England)	Southampton	13 February 2004	4 March 2004	20	2004	
Paul Sturrock	(Scotland)	Southampton	4 March 2004	23 August 2004	172	2004	
Steve Wigley	(England)	Southampton	23 August 2004	10 December 2004	109	2004	
Harry Redknapp	(England)	Southampton	8 December 2004	2 December 2005	359	2004–2005	
Nigel Adkins	(England)	Southampton	12 September 2010	18 January 2013	859	2012–2013	
Mauricio Pochettino	(Argentina)	Southampton	18 January 2013	27 May 2014	494	2013–2014	
Ronald Koeman	(Netherlands)	Southampton	16 June 2014	14 June 2016	729	2014–2016	
Claude Puel	(France)	Southampton	30 June 2016	14 June 2017	349	2016–2017	
Mauricio Pellegrino	(Argentina)	Southampton	23 June 2017	12 March 2018	262	2017–2018	
Mark Hughes	(Wales)	Southampton	14 March 2018	3 December 2018	264	2018	
Kelvin Davis ‡	(England)	Southampton	3 December 2018	5 December 2018	2	2018	
Ralph Hasenhüttl	(Austria)	Southampton	6 December 2018	7 November 2022	1432	2018–2022	
Rubén Sellés ‡	(Spain)	Southampton	7 November 2022	10 November 2022	3	2022	
Nathan Jones	(Wales)	Southampton	10 November 2022	12 February 2023	94	2022–2023	
Rubén Sellés	(Spain)	Southampton	12 February 2023 (Note: Sellés served as caretaker manager until 24 February 2023, when he was given a long-term appointment.)	28 May 2023	105	2023	
Russell Martin	(Scotland)	Southampton	21 June 2023	15 December 2024	543	2024	
Simon Rusk ‡	(Scotland)	Southampton	15 December 2024	23 December 2024	8	2024	
Ivan Jurić	(Croatia)	Southampton	23 December 2024	7 April 2025	105	2024–2025	
Simon Rusk ‡	(Scotland)	Southampton	7 April 2025	25 May 2025	48	2025	
Tony Pulis	(Wales)	Stoke City	15 June 2006	21 May 2013	2532	2008–2013	
Mark Hughes	(Wales)	Stoke City	30 May 2013	6 January 2018	1682	2013–2018	
Eddie Niedzwiecki ‡	(Wales)	Stoke City	8 January 2018	15 January 2018	7	2018	
Paul Lambert	(Scotland)	Stoke City	15 January 2018	18 May 2018	123	2018	
Peter Reid	(England)	Sunderland	29 March 1995	7 October 2002	2749	1996–1997; 1999–2002	
Howard Wilkinson	(England)	Sunderland	10 October 2002	10 March 2003	151	2002–2003	
Mick McCarthy	(Republic of Ireland)	Sunderland	12 March 2003	6 March 2006	1090	2003; 2005–2006	
Kevin Ball ‡	(England)	Sunderland	7 March 2006	31 May 2006	85	2006	
Roy Keane	(Republic of Ireland)	Sunderland	30 August 2006	4 December 2008	827	2007–2008	
Ricky Sbragia	(Scotland)	Sunderland	4 December 2008	24 May 2009	171	2008–2009	
Steve Bruce	(England)	Sunderland	3 June 2009	30 November 2011	910	2009–2011	
Martin O'Neill	(Northern Ireland)	Sunderland	3 December 2011	30 March 2013	483	2011–2013	
Paolo Di Canio	(Italy)	Sunderland	31 March 2013	22 September 2013	175	2013	
Kevin Ball ‡	(England)	Sunderland	22 September 2013	8 October 2013	16	2013	
Gus Poyet	(Uruguay)	Sunderland	8 October 2013	16 March 2015	524	2013–2015	
Dick Advocaat	(Netherlands)	Sunderland	17 March 2015	4 October 2015	201	2015	
Sam Allardyce	(England)	Sunderland	9 October 2015	22 July 2016	287	2015–2016	
David Moyes	(Scotland)	Sunderland	23 July 2016	22 May 2017	303	2016–2017	
Régis Le Bris †	(France)	Sunderland	1 July 2024	Present*	868	2025–	
Brendan Rodgers	(Northern Ireland)	Swansea City	16 July 2010	1 June 2012	686	2011–2012	
Michael Laudrup	(Denmark)	Swansea City	15 June 2012	4 February 2014	599	2012–2014	
Garry Monk	(England)	Swansea City	4 February 2014	9 December 2015	673	2014–2015	
Alan Curtis ‡	(Wales)	Swansea City	9 December 2015	18 January 2016	40	2015–2016	
Francesco Guidolin	(Italy)	Swansea City	18 January 2016	3 October 2016	259	2016	
Bob Bradley	(United States)	Swansea City	3 October 2016	27 December 2016	85	2016	
Alan Curtis ‡	(Wales)	Swansea City	27 December 2016	3 January 2017	7	2016–2017	
Paul Clement	(England)	Swansea City	3 January 2017	20 December 2017	351	2017	
Leon Britton ‡	(England)	Swansea City	20 December 2017	28 December 2017	8	2017	
Carlos Carvalhal	(Portugal)	Swansea City	28 December 2017	18 May 2018	141	2017–2018	
John Gorman	(Scotland)	Swindon Town	4 June 1993	21 November 1994	535	1993–1994	
Doug Livermore	(England)	Tottenham Hotspur	27 May 1992	19 June 1993	388	1992–1993	
Ossie Ardiles	(Argentina)	Tottenham Hotspur	19 June 1993	1 November 1994	500	1993–1994	
Steve Perryman ‡	(England)	Tottenham Hotspur	1 November 1994	15 November 1994	14	1994	
Gerry Francis	(England)	Tottenham Hotspur	15 November 1994	19 November 1997	1100	1994–1997	
Christian Gross	(Switzerland)	Tottenham Hotspur	25 November 1997	5 September 1998	284	1997–1998	
David Pleat ‡	(England)	Tottenham Hotspur	30 August 1998	3 October 1998	24	1998	
Chris Hughton ‡	(Republic of Ireland)	Tottenham Hotspur	7 September 1998	1 October 1998	34	1998	
George Graham	(Scotland)	Tottenham Hotspur	5 October 1998	16 March 2001	893	1998–2001	
David Pleat ‡	(England)	Tottenham Hotspur	16 March 2001	2 April 2001	17	2001	
Glenn Hoddle	(England)	Tottenham Hotspur	2 April 2001	21 September 2003	902	2001–2003	
David Pleat ‡	(England)	Tottenham Hotspur	21 September 2003	3 June 2004	256	2003–2004	
Jacques Santini	(France)	Tottenham Hotspur	3 June 2004	5 November 2004	155	2004	
Martin Jol	(Netherlands)	Tottenham Hotspur	5 November 2004	25 October 2007	1084	2004–2007	
Clive Allen ‡	(England)	Tottenham Hotspur	25 October 2007	29 October 2007	4	2007	
Alex Inglethorpe ‡	(England)	Tottenham Hotspur	25 October 2007	29 October 2007	4	2007	
Juande Ramos	(Spain)	Tottenham Hotspur	27 October 2007	25 October 2008	364	2007–2008	
Clive Allen ‡	(England)	Tottenham Hotspur	25 October 2008	26 October 2008	1	2008	
Harry Redknapp	(England)	Tottenham Hotspur	26 October 2008	13 June 2012	1326	2008–2012	
André Villas-Boas	(Portugal)	Tottenham Hotspur	6 July 2012	16 December 2013	528	2012–2013	
Tim Sherwood	(England)	Tottenham Hotspur	16 December 2013	13 May 2014	148	2013–2014	
Mauricio Pochettino	(Argentina)	Tottenham Hotspur	27 May 2014	19 November 2019	2002	2014–2019	
José Mourinho	(Portugal)	Tottenham Hotspur	20 November 2019	19 April 2021	516	2019–2021	
Ryan Mason ‡	(England)	Tottenham Hotspur	19 April 2021	30 June 2021	72	2021	
Nuno Espírito Santo	(Portugal)	Tottenham Hotspur	30 June 2021	1 November 2021	124	2021	
Antonio Conte	(Italy)	Tottenham Hotspur	2 November 2021	26 March 2023	509	2021–2023	
Cristian Stellini ‡	(Italy)	Tottenham Hotspur	26 March 2023	24 April 2023	29	2023	
Ryan Mason ‡	(England)	Tottenham Hotspur	24 April 2023	28 May 2023	34	2023	
Ange Postecoglou	(Australia)	Tottenham Hotspur	6 June 2023	6 June 2025	731	2023–2025	
Thomas Frank	(Denmark)	Tottenham Hotspur	12 June 2025	11 February 2026	244	2025–2026	
Igor Tudor	(Croatia)	Tottenham Hotspur	14 February 2026	29 March 2026	43	2026	
Roberto De Zerbi †	(Italy)	Tottenham Hotspur	31 March 2026	Present*	230	2026–	
Graham Taylor	(England)	Watford	21 February 1996	1 June 2001	1927	1999–2000	
Aidy Boothroyd	(England)	Watford	29 March 2005	3 November 2008	1315	2006–2007	
Quique Sánchez Flores	(Spain)	Watford	5 June 2015	15 May 2016	345	2015–2016	
Walter Mazzarri	(Italy)	Watford	1 July 2016	21 May 2017	324	2016–2017	
Marco Silva	(Portugal)	Watford	27 May 2017	21 January 2018	239	2017–2018	
Javi Gracia	(Spain)	Watford	21 January 2018	7 September 2019	594	2018–2019	
Quique Sánchez Flores	(Spain)	Watford	7 September 2019	1 December 2019	85	2019	
Hayden Mullins ‡	(England)	Watford	2 December 2019	7 December 2019	5	2019	
Nigel Pearson	(England)	Watford	8 December 2019	19 July 2020	224	2019–2020	
Hayden Mullins ‡	(England)	Watford	19 July 2020	15 August 2020	27	2020	
Xisco Muñoz	(Spain)	Watford	20 December 2020	3 October 2021	287	2021	
Claudio Ranieri	(Italy)	Watford	4 October 2021	24 January 2022	112	2021–2022	
Roy Hodgson	(England)	Watford	25 January 2022	22 May 2022	117	2022	
Gary Megson	(England)	West Bromwich Albion	9 March 2000	26 October 2004	1692	2002–2003; 2004	
Frank Burrows ‡	(Scotland)	West Bromwich Albion	27 October 2004	8 November 2004	12	2004	
Bryan Robson	(England)	West Bromwich Albion	9 November 2004	18 September 2006	678	2004–2006	
Tony Mowbray	(England)	West Bromwich Albion	18 October 2006	16 June 2009	972	2008–2009	
Roberto Di Matteo	(Italy)	West Bromwich Albion	30 June 2009	6 February 2011	586	2010–2011	
Michael Appleton ‡	(England)	West Bromwich Albion	6 February 2011	14 February 2011	8	2011	
Roy Hodgson	(England)	West Bromwich Albion	14 February 2011	13 May 2012	454	2011–2012	
Steve Clarke	(Scotland)	West Bromwich Albion	8 June 2012	14 December 2013	554	2012–2013	
Keith Downing ‡	(England)	West Bromwich Albion	14 December 2013	9 January 2014	26	2013–2014	
Pepe Mel	(Spain)	West Bromwich Albion	9 January 2014	12 May 2014	123	2014	
Alan Irvine	(Scotland)	West Bromwich Albion	14 June 2014	29 December 2014	199	2014	
Rob Kelly ‡	(England)	West Bromwich Albion	29 December 2014	1 January 2015	3	2014–2015	
Tony Pulis	(Wales)	West Bromwich Albion	1 January 2015	20 November 2017	1054	2015–2017	
Gary Megson ‡	(England)	West Bromwich Albion	20 November 2017	29 November 2017	9	2017	
Alan Pardew	(England)	West Bromwich Albion	29 November 2017	2 April 2018	124	2017–2018	
Darren Moore	(Jamaica)	West Bromwich Albion	2 April 2018 (Note: Moore served as caretaker manager until 18 May 2018, when he was given a long-term appointment.)	9 March 2019	341	2018	
Slaven Bilić	(Croatia)	West Bromwich Albion	13 June 2019	16 December 2020	552	2020	
Sam Allardyce	(England)	West Bromwich Albion	16 December 2020	23 May 2021	158	2020–2021	
Billy Bonds	(England)	West Ham United	23 February 1990	10 August 1994	1629	1993–1994	
Harry Redknapp	(England)	West Ham United	10 August 1994	9 May 2001	2464	1994–2001	
Glenn Roeder	(England)	West Ham United	9 May 2001	24 April 2003	715	2001–2003	
Trevor Brooking ‡	(England)	West Ham United	24 April 2003	12 May 2003	18	2003	
Alan Pardew	(England)	West Ham United	20 October 2003	11 December 2006	1148	2005–2006	
Alan Curbishley	(England)	West Ham United	13 December 2006	3 September 2008	630	2006–2008	
Kevin Keen ‡	(England)	West Ham United	3 September 2008	15 September 2008	12	2008	
Gianfranco Zola	(Italy)	West Ham United	15 September 2008	11 May 2010	603	2008–2010	
Avram Grant	(Israel)	West Ham United	3 June 2010	15 May 2011	346	2010–2011	
Kevin Keen ‡	(England)	West Ham United	15 May 2011	1 June 2011	17	2011	
Sam Allardyce	(England)	West Ham United	1 June 2011	24 May 2015	1453	2012–2015	
Slaven Bilić	(Croatia)	West Ham United	9 June 2015	6 November 2017	881	2015–2017	
David Moyes	(Scotland)	West Ham United	7 November 2017	16 May 2018	190	2017–2018	
Manuel Pellegrini	(Chile)	West Ham United	22 May 2018	28 December 2019	585	2018–2019	
David Moyes	(Scotland)	West Ham United	29 December 2019	19 May 2024	1603	2019–2024	
Julen Lopetegui	(Spain)	West Ham United	1 July 2024	8 January 2025	191	2024–2025	
Graham Potter	(England)	West Ham United	9 January 2025	27 September 2025	261	2025	
Nuno Espírito Santo	(Portugal)	West Ham United	27 September 2025	3 November 2026	402	2025–2026	
Paul Jewell	(England)	Wigan Athletic	12 June 2001	14 May 2007	2162	2005–2007	
Chris Hutchings	(England)	Wigan Athletic	14 May 2007	5 November 2007	175	2007	
Frank Barlow ‡	(England)	Wigan Athletic	5 November 2007	26 November 2007	21	2007	
Steve Bruce	(England)	Wigan Athletic	26 November 2007	3 June 2009	555	2007–2009	
Roberto Martínez	(Spain)	Wigan Athletic	15 June 2009	28 May 2013	1443	2009–2013	
Joe Kinnear	(Republic of Ireland)	Wimbledon	19 January 1992	9 June 1999	2698	1992–1999	
Egil Olsen	(Norway)	Wimbledon	9 June 1999	1 May 2000	327	1999–2000	
Terry Burton	(England)	Wimbledon	1 May 2000	25 April 2002	724	2000	
Dave Jones	(England)	Wolverhampton Wanderers	3 January 2001	11 November 2004	1408	2003–2004	
Mick McCarthy	(Republic of Ireland)	Wolverhampton Wanderers	5 August 2006	14 February 2012	2019	2009–2012	
Terry Connor	(England)	Wolverhampton Wanderers	24 February 2012	30 June 2012	127	2012	
Nuno Espírito Santo	(Portugal)	Wolverhampton Wanderers	31 May 2017	23 May 2021	1453	2018–2021	
Bruno Lage	(Portugal)	Wolverhampton Wanderers	9 June 2021	2 October 2022	480	2021–2022	
Steve Davis ‡	(England)	Wolverhampton Wanderers	3 October 2022	13 November 2022	41	2022	
Julen Lopetegui	(Spain)	Wolverhampton Wanderers	14 November 2022	8 August 2023	267	2022–2023	
Gary O'Neil	(England)	Wolverhampton Wanderers	9 August 2023	15 December 2024	494	2023–2024	
Vítor Pereira	(Portugal)	Wolverhampton Wanderers	19 December 2024	2 November 2025	318	2024–2025	
James Collins ‡	(England)	Wolverhampton Wanderers	2 November 2025	12 November 2025	10	2025	
Rob Edwards	(Wales)	Wolverhampton Wanderers	12 November 2025	11 June 2026	211	2025–2026	

=== By club ===
Club	Total
Arsenal	9
Aston Villa	22
Barnsley	1
Birmingham City	3
Blackburn Rovers	10
Blackpool	1
Bolton Wanderers	7
Bournemouth	5
Bradford City	4
Brentford	2
Brighton & Hove Albion	4
Burnley	7
Cardiff City	4
Charlton Athletic	4
Chelsea	31
Coventry City	5
Crystal Palace	24
Derby County	6
Everton	22
Fulham	15
Huddersfield Town	3
Hull City	6
Ipswich Town	6
Leeds United	12
Leicester City	21
Liverpool	12
Luton Town	1
Manchester City	14
Manchester United	14
Middlesbrough	7
Newcastle United	25
Norwich City	9
Nottingham Forest	11
Oldham Athletic	1
Portsmouth	9
Queens Park Rangers	8
Reading	3
Sheffield United	6
Sheffield Wednesday	6
Southampton	27
Stoke City	4
Sunderland	15
Swansea City	10
Swindon Town	1
Tottenham Hotspur	31
Watford	13
West Bromwich Albion	18
West Ham United	17
Wigan Athletic	5
Wimbledon	3
Wolverhampton Wanderers	11

=== By nationality ===
Country	Total appointments	Total individuals
England	250	136
Scotland	64	40
Spain	24	16
Wales	24	12
Italy	22	14
Portugal	19	8
Netherlands	16	11
Ireland	16	8
Northern Ireland	15	8
France	12	9
Germany	11	10
Argentina	7	4
Croatia	5	4
Denmark	4	2
Sweden	3	3
United States	3	3
Norway	3	2
Austria	3	2
Israel	3	1
Australia	2	1
Chile	2	1
Belgium	1	1
Bosnia and Herzegovina	1	1
Brazil	1	1
Jamaica	1	1
Serbia	1	1
Switzerland	1	1
Uruguay	1	1

=== Managers with multiple appointments ===
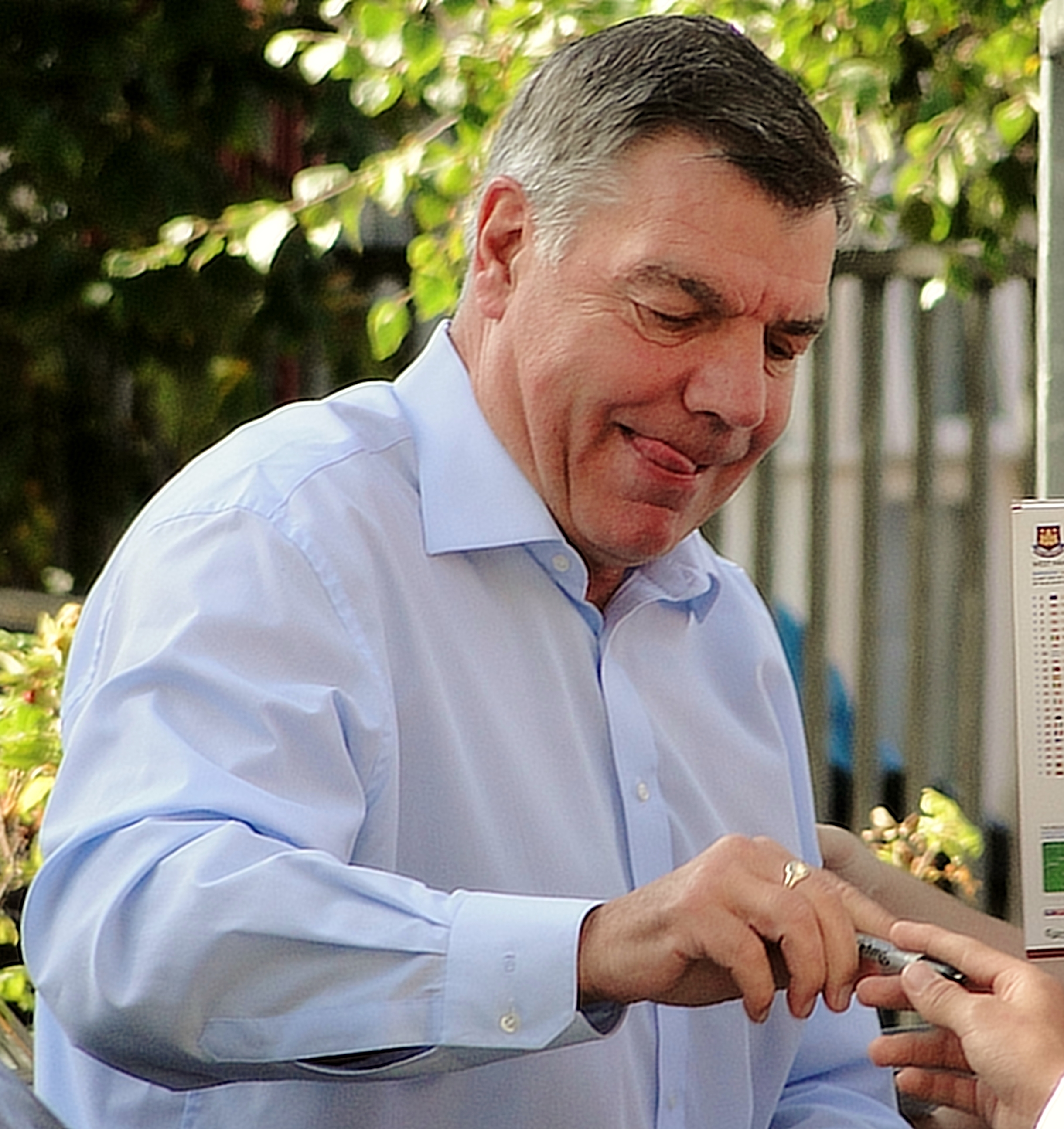
Sam Allardyce has managed the most teams in the Premier League, having taken charge of Bolton Wanderers, Newcastle United, Blackburn Rovers, West Ham United, Sunderland, Crystal Palace, Everton, West Bromwich Albion and Leeds United.

Managers in bold are still active in the Premier League.

Manager	Total appointments	Total clubs
(England) Sam Allardyce	9	9
(England) Roy Hodgson	7	6
(Wales) Mark Hughes	6	6
(England) Harry Redknapp	6	5
(Scotland) **David Moyes**	6	4
(England) Steve Bruce	5	5
(England) Alan Pardew	5	5
(Republic of Ireland) Chris Hughton	5	4
(England) Ron Atkinson	4	4
(Spain) Rafael Benítez	4	4
(Portugal) Nuno Espírito Santo	4	4
(Italy) Claudio Ranieri	4	4
(Portugal) Marco Silva	4	4
(Scotland) Graeme Souness	4	4
(England) Neil Warnock	4	4
(England) **Frank Lampard**	4	3
(Portugal) José Mourinho	4	3
(England) Nigel Pearson	4	3
(England) David Pleat	4	2
(England) Dave Bassett	3	3
(Scotland) Kenny Dalglish	3	3
(Northern Ireland) Iain Dowie	3	3
(England) Sean Dyche	3	3
(Denmark) **Thomas Frank**	3	3
(Scotland) George Graham	3	3
(Israel) Avram Grant	3	3
(England) Glenn Hoddle	3	3
(England) Paul Jewell	3	3
(Scotland) Paul Lambert	3	3
(Northern Ireland) Martin O'Neill	3	3
(England) Scott Parker	3	3
(Argentina) **Mauricio Pochettino**	4	4
(England) Graham Potter	3	3
(Wales) Tony Pulis	3	3
(England) Peter Reid	3	3
(Northern Ireland) Brendan Rodgers	3	3
(England) Joe Royle	3	3
(England) Dean Smith	3	3
(England) **Gary O'Neil**	3	3
(England) Steve Coppell	3	2
(France) Gérard Houllier	3	2
(England) Kevin Keegan	3	2
(England) Ray Lewington	3	2
(Scotland) Kevin MacDonald	3	2
(England) Gary Megson	3	2
(England) Ray Wilkins	3	2
(England) Keith Millen	3	1
(England) Micky Adams	2	2
(England) Nigel Adkins	2	2
(Italy) Carlo Ancelotti	2	2
(England) Michael Appleton	2	2
(England) Alan Ball	2	2
(Croatia) Slaven Bilić	2	2
(Scotland) Eric Black	2	2
(Scotland) Steve Clarke	2	2
(Italy) Antonio Conte	2	2
(Republic of Ireland) Owen Coyle	2	2
(Italy) **Enzo Maresca**	2	2
(England) Alan Curbishley	2	2
(Italy) **Roberto De Zerbi**	2	2
(England) John Deehan	2	2
(Italy) Roberto Di Matteo	2	2
(Wales) Rob Edwards	2	2
(Spain) **Unai Emery**	2	2
(Germany) **Daniel Farke**	2	2
(England) Gerry Francis	2	2
(Spain) Javi Gracia	2	2
(England) John Gregory	2	2
(England) Stuart Gray	2	2
(Netherlands) Ruud Gullit	2	2
(England) Ian Holloway	2	2
(England) Eddie Howe	2	2
(England) Chris Hutchings	2	2
(Netherlands) Martin Jol	2	2
(England) Dave Jones	2	2
(England) Brian Kidd	2	2
(Republic of Ireland) Joe Kinnear	2	2
(Netherlands) Ronald Koeman	2	2
(England) Brian Little	2	2
(Spain) Roberto Martínez	2	2
(Republic of Ireland) Mick McCarthy	2	2
(England) Steve McClaren	2	2
(Scotland) Alex McLeish	2	2
(Republic of Ireland) David O'Leary	2	2
(England) Stuart Pearce	2	2
(Chile) Manuel Pellegrini	2	2
(Portugal) Vítor Pereira	2	2
(Australia) Ange Postecoglou	2	2
(France) Claude Puel	2	2
(England) Bryan Robson	2	2
(England) Glenn Roeder	2	2
(Austria) **Oliver Glasner**	2	2
(England) Tim Sherwood	2	2
(Norway) Ole Gunnar Solskjær	2	2
(Scotland) Gordon Strachan	2	2
(England) Graham Taylor	2	2
(England) Colin Todd	2	2
(England) Terry Venables	2	2
(Portugal) André Villas-Boas	2	2
(Wales) Mike Walker	2	2
(England) Howard Wilkinson	2	2
(Northern Ireland) Danny Wilson	2	2
(Spain) **Andoni Iraola**	2	2
(England) Clive Allen	2	1
(England) Kevin Ball	2	1
(England) Michael Carrick	2	1
(England) John Carver	2	1
(Wales) Alan Curtis	2	1
(Scotland) Duncan Ferguson	2	1
(England) Paul Heckingbottom	2	1
(Netherlands) Guus Hiddink	2	1
(Scotland) Stewart Houston	2	1
(England) Mike Jackson	2	1
(Scotland) Joe Jordan	2	1
(England) Kevin Keen	2	1
(England) Howard Kendall	2	1
(England) Ryan Mason	2	1
(England) Calum McFarlane	2	1
(England) Hayden Mullins	2	1
(Scotland) Simon Rusk	2	1
(England) Adam Sadler	2	1
(Spain) Quique Sánchez Flores	2	1
(Spain) Rubén Sellés	2	1
(Wales) Peter Shreeves	2	1
(England) Mike Stowell	2	1
(England) David Unsworth	2	1
(England) Steve Wigley	2	1
(England) Chris Wilder	2	1

== Most games managed in the Premier League ==
As of 12 November 2026

Current Premier League managers and their current clubs are shown in bold.

Rank	Manager	Nat.	Games	First	Last	Club(s)	Ref.
1	Arsène Wenger	(France)	828	1996	2018	Arsenal (828)	
2	Alex Ferguson	(Scotland)	810	1992	2013	Manchester United (810)	
3	**David Moyes**	(Scotland)	764	2002	2026	**Everton** (494); West Ham United (198); Sunderland (38); Manchester United (34)	
4	Harry Redknapp	(England)	641	1994	2015	West Ham United (269); Portsmouth (158); Tottenham Hotspur (144); Queens Park Rangers (48); Southampton (22)	
5	Sam Allardyce	(England)	541	2001	2023	Bolton Wanderers (226); West Ham United (114); Blackburn Rovers (76); Sunderland (30); West Bromwich Albion (25); Everton (24); Newcastle United (21); Crystal Palace (21); Leeds United (4)	
6	Steve Bruce	(England)	476	2002	2021	Birmingham City (165); Sunderland (89); Newcastle United (84); Hull City (76); Wigan Athletic (62)	
7	Mark Hughes	(Wales)	466	2004	2018	Stoke City (174); Blackburn Rovers (147); Manchester City (55); Fulham (38); Queens Park Rangers (30); Southampton (22)	
8	Roy Hodgson	(England)	416	1997	2024	Crystal Palace (182); Fulham (94); Blackburn Rovers (52); West Bromwich Albion (50); Liverpool (20); Watford (18)	
9	Pep Guardiola	(Spain)	380	2016	2026	Manchester City (380)	
10	Eddie Howe	(England)	369	2015	2026	Bournemouth (190); Newcastle United (179)	
11	José Mourinho	(Portugal)	363	2004	2021	Chelsea (212); Manchester United (93); Tottenham Hotspur (58)	
12	Martin O'Neill	(Northern Ireland)	359	1996	2013	Leicester City (152); Aston Villa (152); Sunderland (55)	
12	Rafael Benítez	(Spain)	359	2004	2022	Liverpool (228); Newcastle United (86); Chelsea (26); Everton (19)	
14	Sean Dyche	(England)	351	2014	2026	Burnley (258); Everton (75); Nottingham Forest (18)	
15	Jürgen Klopp	(Germany)	334	2015	2024	Liverpool (334)	
16	Alan Curbishley	(England)	328	1998	2008	Charlton Athletic (266); West Ham United (62)	
17	Tony Pulis	(Wales)	322	2008	2017	Stoke City (190); West Bromwich Albion (106); Crystal Palace (26)	
18	Alan Pardew	(England)	320	2005	2018	Newcastle United (155); Crystal Palace (74); West Ham United (55); Charlton Athletic (18); West Bromwich Albion (18)	
19	Brendan Rodgers	(Northern Ireland)	312	2011	2023	Leicester City (152); Liverpool (122); Swansea City (38)	
20	Joe Kinnear	(Republic of Ireland)	302	1992	2009	Wimbledon (284); Newcastle United (18)	
Minimum 300 games managed

=== By club ===
Current Premier League managers who hold the record for the club are shown in bold.

Rank	Club	Manager	Nat	Games	Years at club in league
1	Arsenal	Arsène Wenger	(France)	828	1996–2018
2	Manchester United	Alex Ferguson	(Scotland)	810	1992–2013
3	Everton	**David Moyes**	(Scotland)	494	2002–2013, 2025–current
4	Manchester City	Pep Guardiola	(Spain)	380	2016–2026
5	Liverpool	Jürgen Klopp	(Germany)	334	2015–2024
6	Wimbledon	Joe Kinnear	(Republic of Ireland)	284	1992–1999
7	West Ham United	Harry Redknapp	(England)	269	1994–2001
8	Charlton Athletic	Alan Curbishley	(England)	266	1998–1999, 2000–2006
9	Burnley	Sean Dyche	(England)	258	2014–2015, 2016–2022
10	Bolton Wanderers	Sam Allardyce	(England)	226	2001–2007
11	Chelsea	José Mourinho	(Portugal)	212	2004–2007, 2013–2015
12	Tottenham Hotspur	Mauricio Pochettino	(Argentina)	202	2014–2019
13	Derby County	Jim Smith	(England)	197	1996–2001
14	Middlesbrough	Steve McClaren	(England)	190	2001–2006
14	Stoke City	Tony Pulis	(Wales)	190	2008–2013
14	Bournemouth	Eddie Howe	(England)	190	2015–2020
17	Newcastle United	Bobby Robson	(England)	188	1999–2004
18	Crystal Palace	Roy Hodgson	(England)	182	2017–2021, 2023–2024
19	Coventry City	Gordon Strachan	(Scotland)	178	1996–2001
20	Leeds United	Howard Wilkinson	(England)	169	1992–1996
21	Birmingham City	Steve Bruce	(England)	165	2002–2006, 2007
22	Sunderland	Peter Reid	(England)	161	1996–1997, 1999–2002
23	Portsmouth	Harry Redknapp	(England)	158	2003–2004, 2005–2008
24	Leicester City	Martin O'Neill / Brendan Rodgers	(Northern Ireland)	152	1996–2000 / 2019–2023
24	Fulham	Chris Coleman / Marco Silva	(Wales) / (Portugal)	152	2003–2007 / 2022–2026
24	Aston Villa	Martin O'Neill	(Northern Ireland)	152	2006–2010
24	Wigan Athletic	Roberto Martínez	(Spain)	152	2009–2013
24	Brentford	Thomas Frank	(Denmark)	152	2021–2025
29	Southampton	Ralph Hasenhüttl	(Austria)	151	2018–2022
30	Blackburn Rovers	Mark Hughes	(Wales)	147	2004–2008
31	Sheffield Wednesday	Trevor Francis	(England)	126	1992–1995
32	Brighton & Hove Albion	Graham Potter	(England)	120	2019–2022
33	Wolverhampton Wanderers	Nuno Espírito Santo	(Portugal)	114	2018–2021
34	West Bromwich Albion	Tony Pulis	(Wales)	106	2015–2017
35	Ipswich Town	John Lyall	(England)	102	1992–1994
Minimum 100 games managed

== Premier League title-winning managers ==
Rank	Manager	Nat.	Titles	Club(s)	Seasons
1	Alex Ferguson	(Scotland)	13	Manchester United	1992–93, 1993–94, 1995–96, 1996–97, 1998–99, 1999–2000, 2000–01, 2002–03, 2006–07, 2007–08, 2008–09, 2010–11, 2012–13
2	Pep Guardiola	(Spain)	6	Manchester City	2017–18, 2018–19, 2020–21, 2021–22, 2022–23, 2023–24
3	José Mourinho	(Portugal)	3	Chelsea	2004–05, 2005–06, 2014–15
3	Arsène Wenger	(France)	3	Arsenal	1997–98, 2001–02, 2003–04
5	Carlo Ancelotti	(Italy)	1	Chelsea	2009–10
5	Mikel Arteta	(Spain)	1	Arsenal	2025–26
5	Antonio Conte	(Italy)	1	Chelsea	2016–17
5	Kenny Dalglish	(Scotland)	1	Blackburn Rovers	1994–95
5	Jürgen Klopp	(Germany)	1	Liverpool	2019–20
5	Roberto Mancini	(Italy)	1	Manchester City	2011–12
5	Manuel Pellegrini	(Chile)	1	Manchester City	2013–14
5	Claudio Ranieri	(Italy)	1	Leicester City	2015–16
5	Arne Slot	(Netherlands)	1	Liverpool	2024–25

== See also ==
- List of current Premier League and English Football League managers
