= List of Premier League clubs =

The following is a list of clubs who have played in the Premier League since its formation in 1992.

Over that span, 51 teams have played in the Premier League, two of which (Cardiff City and Swansea City) are located in Wales; they play in the English football league system for practical and historical reasons.

Preston North End are the only former top-flight First Division champions who have never played in the Premier League; they are among a group of fourteen clubs, twelve of which are active, that have played in the old First Division but not in the Premier League. By contrast, Barnsley, Bournemouth, Hull City, Reading, Swindon Town and Wigan Athletic never played in the old First Division before being promoted to the Premier League.

Thirteen of the 22 founder members of the Premier League are competing in the 2026–27 season. Six (Arsenal, Chelsea, Everton, Liverpool, Manchester United, and Tottenham Hotspur) have contested every season of the Premier League. The remaining seven (Aston Villa, Coventry City, Crystal Palace, Ipswich Town, Leeds United, Manchester City and Nottingham Forest), were also founder members, though each team has been relegated at least once in the past. Two clubs, Brighton & Hove Albion and Brentford, are not founding members of the Premier League, but have not been relegated since making their debuts in the Premier League after promotion in 2017 and 2021, respectively.

== Table ==
All statistics here refer to time in the Premier League only, with the exception of 'Most Recent Finish' (which refers to all levels of play) and 'Last Promotion' (which refers to the club's last promotion from the second tier of English football). For the 'Top Scorer' column, those in bold still play in the Premier League for the club shown. Premier League teams playing in the current season or confirmed for the next season are indicated in bold, while founding members of the Premier League are shown in italics. A 'spell' refers to a number of consecutive seasons within the league, uninterrupted by relegation. If the longest spell is the current spell, this is shown in bold, and if the highest finish is that of the most recent season, then this is also shown in bold.

| Club | Location | Total seasons | Total spells | Longest spell | Most recent promotion | Most recent relegation | Total seasons absent | Seasons | Current spell | Most recent finish (2025–26) | Highest finish | Top scorer |
|---|---|---|---|---|---|---|---|---|---|---|---|---|
| **Arsenal** | London (Holloway) | 35 | 1 | **35** | 1914–15 (Note: Arsenal finished 5th in Division Two in the 1914–15 season, but the Football League was then suspended until 1919–20 due to the First World War. After the war, Division One was expanded from 20 to 22 clubs and Arsenal was elected to the First Division for the 1919–20 season.) | Never relegated | 0 | **1992–** | 35 | 1st | 1st | Thierry Henry (175) |
| **Aston Villa** | Birmingham (Aston) | 32 | 2 | 24 | 2018–19 | 2015–16 | 3 | 1992–2016; **2019–** | 8 | 4th | 2nd | Ollie Watkins (91) |
| Barnsley | Barnsley | 1 | 1 | 1 | 1996–97 | 1997–98 | 34 | 1997–1998 | 0 | League One; 15th | 19th (relegated) | Neil Redfearn (10) |
| Birmingham City | Birmingham (Bordesley) | 7 | 3 | 4 | 2008–09 | 2010–11 | 28 | 2002–2006; 2007–2008; 2009–2011 | 0 | Championship; 10th | 9th | Mikael Forssell (29) |
| Blackburn Rovers | Blackburn | 18 | 2 | 11 | 2000–01 | 2011–12 | 17 | 1992–1999; 2001–2012 | 0 | Championship; 20th | 1st | Alan Shearer (112) |
| Blackpool | Blackpool | 1 | 1 | 1 | 2009–10 | 2010–11 | 34 | 2010–2011 | 0 | League One; 13th | 19th (relegated) | DJ Campbell (13) |
| Bolton Wanderers | Bolton | 13 | 3 | 11 | 2000–01 | 2011–12 | 22 | 1995–1996; 1997–1998; 2001–2012 | 0 | League One; 5th (promoted) | 6th | Kevin Davies (68) |
| **Bournemouth** | Bournemouth | 10 | 2 | **5** | 2021–22 | 2019–20 | 25 | 2015–2020; **2022–** | 5 | 6th | 6th | Joshua King (48) |
| Bradford City | Bradford | 2 | 1 | 2 | 1998–99 | 2000–01 | 33 | 1999–2001 | 0 | League One; 4th | 17th | Dean Windass (13) |
| **Brentford** | London (Brentford) | 6 | 1 | **6** | 2020–21 | Never relegated | 29 | **2021–** | 6 | 9th | 9th | Yoane Wissa (45) |
| **Brighton & Hove Albion** | Brighton | 10 | 1 | **10** | 2016–17 | Never relegated | 25 | **2017–** | 10 | 8th | 6th | Danny Welbeck (46) |
| Burnley | Burnley | 10 | 5 | 6 | 2024–25 | 2025–26 | 25 | 2009–2010; 2014–2015; 2016–2022; 2023–2024; 2025–2026 | 0 | 19th (relegated) | 7th | Chris Wood (49) |
| Cardiff City | Cardiff | 2 | 2 | 1 | 2017–18 | 2018–19 | 33 | 2013–2014; 2018–2019 | 0 | League One; 2nd (promoted) | 18th (relegated) | Jordon Mutch (7) |
| Charlton Athletic | London (Charlton) | 8 | 2 | 7 | 1999–2000 | 2006–07 | 27 | 1998–1999; 2000–2007 | 0 | Championship; 19th | 7th | Jason Euell (34) |
| **Chelsea** | London (Fulham) | 35 | 1 | **35** | 1988–89 | Never relegated | 0 | **1992–** | 35 | 10th | 1st | Frank Lampard (147) |
| **Coventry City** | Coventry | 10 | 2 | 9 | 2025–26 | 2000–01 | 25 | 1992–2001; **2026–** | 1 | Championship; 1st (promoted) | 11th | Dion Dublin (61) |
| **Crystal Palace** | London (Selhurst) | 18 | 5 | **14** | 2012–13 | 2004–05 | 17 | 1992–1993; 1994–1995; 1997–1998; 2004–2005; **2013–** | 14 | 15th | 10th | Wilfried Zaha (68) |
| Derby County | Derby | 7 | 2 | 6 | 2006–07 | 2007–08 | 28 | 1996–2002; 2007–2008 | 0 | Championship; 8th | 8th | Dean Sturridge (32) |
| **Everton** | Liverpool (Vauxhall) | 35 | 1 | **35** | 1953–54 | Never relegated | 0 | **1992–** | 35 | 13th | 4th | Romelu Lukaku (68) |
| **Fulham** | London (Fulham) | 20 | 4 | 13 | 2021–22 | 2020–21 | 15 | 2001–2014; 2018–2019; 2020–2021; **2022–** | 5 | 11th | 7th | Clint Dempsey (50) |
| Huddersfield Town | Huddersfield | 2 | 1 | 2 | 2016–17 | 2018–19 | 33 | 2017–2019 | 0 | League One; 9th | 16th | Steve Mounié (9) |
| **Hull City** | Kingston upon Hull | 6 | 4 | 2 | 2025–26 | 2016–17 | 29 | 2008–2010; 2013–2015; 2016–2017; **2026–** | 1 | Championship; 6th (promoted) | 16th | Nikica Jelavić (12) |
| **Ipswich Town** | Ipswich | 7 | 4 | 3 | 2025–26 | 2024–25 | 28 | 1992–1995; 2000–2002; 2024–2025; **2026–** | 1 | Championship; 2nd (promoted) | 5th | Marcus Stewart (25) |
| **Leeds United** | Leeds | 17 | 3 | 12 | 2024–25 | 2022–23 | 18 | 1992–2004; 2020–2023; **2025–** | 2 | 14th | 3rd | Mark Viduka (59) |
| Leicester City | Leicester | 18 | 5 | 9 | 2023–24 | 2024–25 | 17 | 1994–1995; 1996–2002; 2003–2004; 2014–2023; 2024–2025 | 0 | Championship; 23rd (relegated) | 1st | Jamie Vardy (145) |
| **Liverpool** | Liverpool (Anfield) | 35 | 1 | **35** | 1961–62 | Never relegated | 0 | **1992–** | 35 | 5th | 1st | Mohamed Salah (191) |
| Luton Town | Luton | 1 | 1 | 1 | 2022–23 | 2023–24 | 34 | 2023–2024 | 0 | League One; 7th | 18th (relegated) | Carlton Morris (11) |
| **Manchester City** | Manchester | 30 | 3 | **25** | 2001–02 | 2000–01 | 5 | 1992–1996; 2000–2001; **2002–** | 25 | 2nd | 1st | Sergio Agüero (184) |
| **Manchester United** | Manchester (Old Trafford) | 35 | 1 | **35** | 1974–75 | Never relegated | 0 | **1992–** | 35 | 3rd | 1st | Wayne Rooney (183) |
| Middlesbrough | Middlesbrough | 15 | 4 | 11 | 2015–16 | 2016–17 | 20 | 1992–1993; 1995–1997; 1998–2009; 2016–2017 | 0 | Championship; 5th | 7th | Hamilton Ricard (31) |
| **Newcastle United** | Newcastle upon Tyne | 32 | 3 | 16 | 2016–17 | 2015–16 | 3 | 1993–2009; 2010–2016; **2017–** | 10 | 12th | 2nd | Alan Shearer (148) |
| Norwich City | Norwich | 10 | 6 | 3 | 2020–21 | 2021–22 | 25 | 1992–1995; 2004–2005; 2011–2014; 2015–2016; 2019–2020; 2021–2022 | 0 | Championship; 9th | 3rd | Chris Sutton (33) |
| **Nottingham Forest** | West Bridgford | 10 | 4 | **5** | 2021–22 | 1998–99 | 25 | 1992–1993; 1994–1997; 1998–1999; **2022–** | 5 | 16th | 3rd | **Chris Wood** (38) |
| Oldham Athletic | Oldham | 2 | 1 | 2 | 1990–91 | 1993–94 | 33 | 1992–1994 | 0 | League Two; 10th | 19th | Graeme Sharp (16) |
| Portsmouth | Portsmouth | 7 | 1 | 7 | 2002–03 | 2009–10 | 28 | 2003–2010 | 0 | Championship; 18th | 8th | Yakubu (28) |
| Queens Park Rangers | London (Shepherd's Bush) | 7 | 3 | 4 | 2013–14 | 2014–15 | 28 | 1992–1996; 2011–2013; 2014–2015 | 0 | Championship; 15th | 5th | Les Ferdinand (60) |
| Reading | Reading | 3 | 2 | 2 | 2011–12 | 2012–13 | 32 | 2006–2008; 2012–2013 | 0 | League One; 12th | 8th | Kevin Doyle (19) |
| Sheffield United | Sheffield (Highfield) | 6 | 4 | 2 | 2022–23 | 2023–24 | 29 | 1992–1994; 2006–2007; 2019–2021; 2023–2024 | 0 | Championship; 13th | 9th | Brian Deane (15) |
| Sheffield Wednesday | Sheffield (Owlerton) | 8 | 1 | 8 | 1990–91 | 1999–2000 | 27 | 1992–2000 | 0 | Championship; 24th (relegated) | 7th | Mark Bright (48) |
| Southampton | Southampton | 25 | 3 | 13 | 2023–24 | 2024–25 | 10 | 1992–2005; 2012–2023; 2024–2025 | 0 | Championship; 4th | 6th | Matt Le Tissier (100) |
| Stoke City | Stoke-on-Trent | 10 | 1 | 10 | 2007–08 | 2017–18 | 25 | 2008–2018 | 0 | Championship; 17th | 9th | Peter Crouch (45) |
| **Sunderland** | Sunderland | 18 | 5 | 10 | 2024–25 | 2016–17 | 17 | 1996–1997; 1999–2003; 2005–2006; 2007–2017; **2025–** | 2 | 7th | 7th | Kevin Phillips (61) |
| Swansea City | Swansea | 7 | 1 | 7 | 2010–11 | 2017–18 | 28 | 2011–2018 | 0 | Championship; 11th | 8th | Gylfi Sigurðsson (34) |
| Swindon Town | Swindon | 1 | 1 | 1 | 1992–93 | 1993–94 | 34 | 1993–1994 | 0 | League Two; 9th | 22nd (relegated) | Jan Åge Fjørtoft (12) |
| **Tottenham Hotspur** | London (Tottenham) | 35 | 1 | **35** | 1977–78 | Never relegated | 0 | **1992–** | 35 | 17th | 2nd | Harry Kane (213) |
| Watford | Watford | 8 | 4 | 5 | 2020–21 | 2021–22 | 27 | 1999–2000; 2006–2007; 2015–2020; 2021–2022 | 0 | Championship; 16th | 11th | Troy Deeney (47) |
| West Bromwich Albion | West Bromwich | 13 | 5 | 8 | 2019–20 | 2020–21 | 22 | 2002–2003; 2004–2006; 2008–2009; 2010–2018; 2020–2021 | 0 | Championship; 21st | 8th | Peter Odemwingie (30) |
| West Ham United | London (Stratford) | 30 | 3 | 14 | 2011–12 | 2025–26 | 5 | 1993–2003; 2005–2011; 2012–2026 | 0 | 18th (relegated) | 5th | Michail Antonio (68) |
| Wigan Athletic | Wigan | 8 | 1 | 8 | 2004–05 | 2012–13 | 27 | 2005–2013 | 0 | League One; 16th | 10th | Hugo Rodallega (24) |
| Wimbledon (Note: Wimbledon relocated from London to Milton Keynes in 2003, and renamed themselves Milton Keynes Dons a year later.) | London (Wimbledon (Note: For the entirety of their time in the Premier League, Wimbledon played their home games at Selhurst Park, the home of Crystal Palace.)) | 8 | 1 | 8 | 1985–86 | 1999–2000 | 27 | 1992–2000 | 0 | Relocated to become MK Dons | 6th | Dean Holdsworth (58) |
| Wolverhampton Wanderers | Wolverhampton | 12 | 3 | 8 | 2017–18 | 2025–26 | 23 | 2003–2004; 2009–2012; 2018–2026 | 0 | 20th (relegated) | 7th | Raúl Jiménez (40) |

The 2006–07 season marked the first occasion former Premier League members were in all three divisions of the Football League following the relegation of Swindon Town to League Two. Since then, other former Premier League clubs relegated to League Two have included Bradford City, Portsmouth, Blackpool, Coventry City, Oldham Athletic and Bolton Wanderers. Oldham became the first former Premier League club to be relegated to the National League during the 2022–23 season.

Norwich City have had the most separate spells in the Premier League, with six, which have lasted from one to three seasons in length.

Three clubs – Luton Town, Notts County and West Ham United – were in the top flight in 1991–92, and so took part in the original negotiations in 1991 that led to the formation of the Premier League, resigning their membership of The Football League along with the other 19 clubs in the top flight. However, the clubs were relegated that season and were thereby not founding Premier League members. West Ham won promotion to the Premier League the following season. Notts County has not returned to the top flight since, even dropping to the National League in 2019. Luton Town also dropped to the National League in 2009, but managed to return to the Football League in 2014 and won promotion to the Premier League in 2023 after play-offs.

== Location of all clubs who have competed in the Premier League ==
Where a club has played at multiple locations, the current location is shown (if they are a current Premier League member), or the location played at during the most recent Premier League season they competed in (if they are currently in the lower divisions).

| Location of Premier League clubs since 1992; Current members (2026–27) in **bold** | Greater London Greater Manchester North West England West Midlands South Yorkshire West Yorkshire |

== Clubs that have competed in the top flight First Division, but not the Premier League ==
Clubs who have competed in the top flight First Division, but not the Premier League

| Club | Town or city | Highest First Division finish | Total seasons | Last relegation | Current status (2026–27) | Level in pyramid |
|---|---|---|---|---|---|---|
| Accrington (Note: The Accrington Stanley club competing today in League Two, as well as its 1891 predecessor, are unrelated to the original Accrington club.) | Accrington | 6th | 5 | 1892–93 | Defunct | – |
| Bradford Park Avenue (Note: The original Bradford Park Avenue went into liquidation in May 1974 and reformed as a Sunday league club. The club was refounded in 1988.) | Bradford (Horton Park) | 9th | 3 | 1920–21 | Northern Premier League Division One East | 8 |
| Bristol City | Bristol (Ashton Gate) | 2nd | 9 | 1979–80 | Championship | 2 |
| Bury (Note: The original Bury F.C. was expelled from the EFL on 27 August 2019. Bury A.F.C. was formed as a phoenix club in December of the same year. Following FA approval of a June 2023 merger between Bury F.C. and Bury A.F.C., the two teams' histories were combined, retroactively counting Bury A.F.C.'s seasons as seasons for Bury F.C.) | Bury | 4th | 22 | 1928–29 | Northern Premier League | 7 |
| Carlisle United | Carlisle | 22nd | 1 | 1974–75 | National League | 5 |
| Darwen (Note: The original Darwen F.C. was wound up in May 2009. A.F.C. Darwen was formed as a phoenix club the same month.) | Darwen | 14th | 2 | 1893–94 | North West Counties League | 10 |
| Glossop North End | Glossop | 18th | 1 | 1899–1900 | North West Counties League | 9 |
| Grimsby Town | Cleethorpes | 5th | 12 | 1947–48 | League Two | 4 |
| Leyton Orient | London (Leyton) | 22nd | 1 | 1962–63 | League One | 3 |
| Millwall | London (New Cross) | 10th | 2 | 1989–90 | Championship | 2 |
| Northampton Town | Northampton | 21st | 1 | 1965–66 | League Two | 4 |
| Notts County | Nottingham | 3rd | 30 | 1991–92 | League Two | 4 |
| Oxford United | Oxford | 18th | 3 | 1987–88 | League One | 3 |
| Preston North End | Preston | 1st | 46 | 1960–61 | Championship | 2 |

== Overall number of seasons in First Division and Premier League ==
The number of seasons that each team has played in the top division between 1888–89 and 2026–27. A total of 65 teams have competed in at least one season of the top division. No team has participated in all 128 seasons; Everton have been absent for the fewest seasons, missing just four for a total of 124 seasons in the top flight. Teams in bold participate in the 2026–27 Premier League. Teams in italic have never competed in the Premier League, only the old First Division.

| Seasons | Clubs |
|---|---|
| 124 | **Everton** |
| 113 | **Aston Villa** |
| 112 | **Liverpool** |
| 110 | **Arsenal** |
| 102 | **Manchester United** |
| 98 | **Manchester City** |
| 95 | **Newcastle United** |
| 92 | **Chelsea**, **Tottenham Hotspur** |
| 88 | **Sunderland** |
| 81 | West Bromwich Albion |
| 73 | Bolton Wanderers |
| 72 | Blackburn Rovers |
| 71 | Wolverhampton Wanderers |
| 68 | West Ham United |
| 66 | Sheffield Wednesday |
| 65 | Derby County |
| 63 | Sheffield United |
| 62 | Stoke City |
| 61 | Middlesbrough, Burnley, **Nottingham Forest** |
| 57 | Birmingham City |
| 56 | Leicester City |
| 55 | **Leeds United** |
| 47 | Southampton |
| 46 | Preston North End |
| 35 | **Coventry City** |
| 33 | Portsmouth |
| 32 | Huddersfield Town, **Fulham** |
| 30 | Notts County |
| 28 | Blackpool, **Ipswich Town** |
| 27 | Norwich City, **Crystal Palace** |
| 26 | Charlton Athletic |
| 23 | Queens Park Rangers |
| 22 | Bury |
| 17 | Cardiff City, Luton Town |
| 14 | Wimbledon, Watford, **Brighton & Hove Albion** |
| 12 | Grimsby Town, Oldham Athletic, Bradford City |
| 11 | **Brentford** |
| 10 | **Bournemouth** |
| 9 | Bristol City, Swansea City |
| 8 | Wigan Athletic |
| 6 | **Hull City** |
| 5 | Accrington |
| 3 | Bradford Park Avenue, Oxford United, Reading |
| 2 | Darwen, Millwall |
| 1 | Glossop North End, Leyton Orient, Northampton Town, Carlisle United, Swindon Town, Barnsley |
