= Adam Sadler =

English football coach (born 1980)

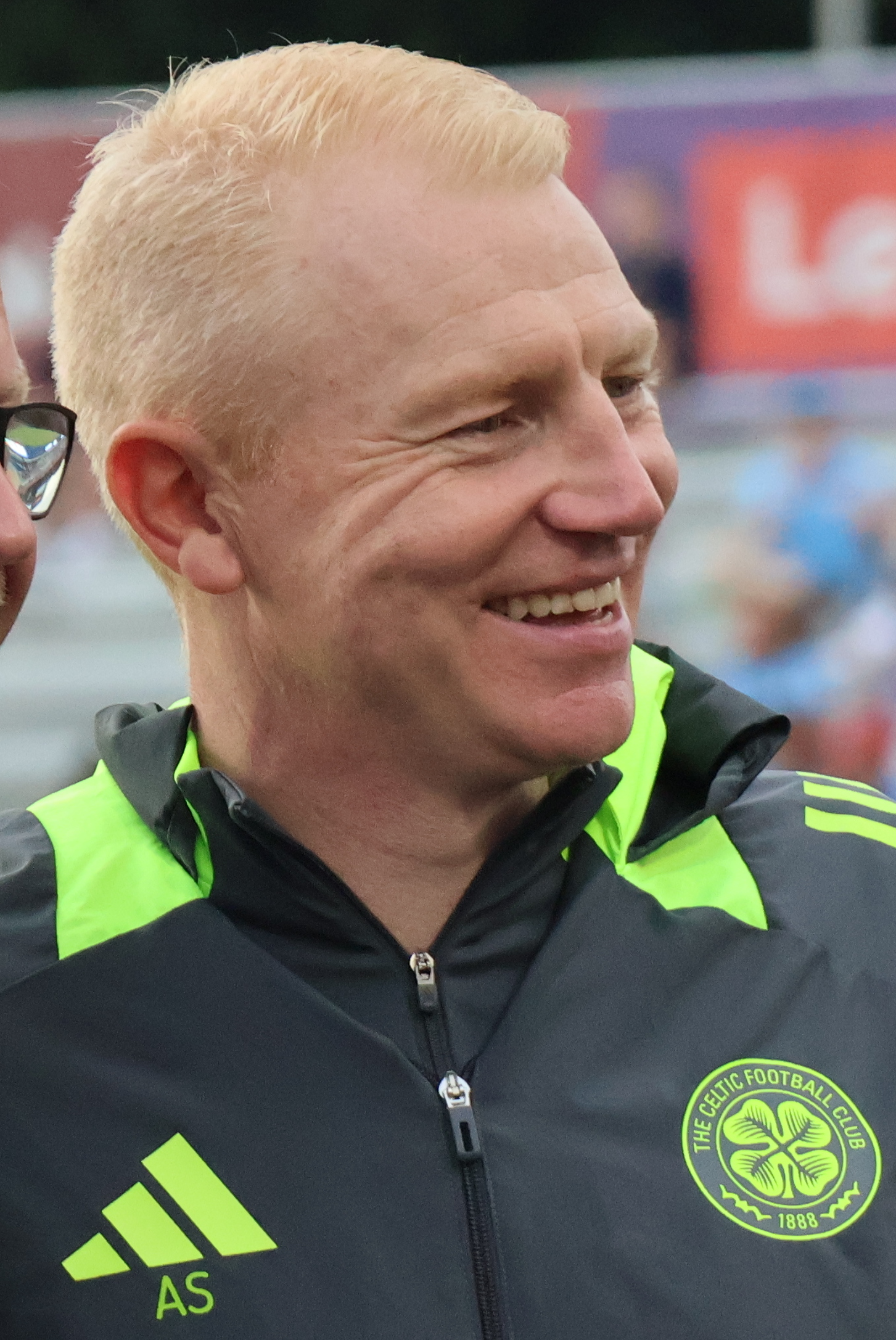
- Sadler with Celtic in 2024

Personal information
- Date of birth: 9 January 1980 (age 46)
- Place of birth: North Shields, England
- Position: Goalkeeper

Team information
- Current team: Radomiak Radom (assistant)

Youth career
- Newcastle United
- 1996–1998: Manchester United
- 1998–1999: Barnsley

Senior career*
Years	Team	Apps	(Gls)
- Gretna
- Blyth Spartans

Managerial career
- 2019: Leicester City (joint-caretaker)
- 2023: Leicester City (joint-caretaker)
- * Club domestic league appearances and goals

Adam Sadler (born 9 January 1980) is an English football coach who is currently the assistant manager of Ekstraklasa club Radomiak Radom.

== Playing career ==
Sadler had stints in the youth academies at Newcastle United, Manchester United and Barnsley before joining Scottish club Gretna. In August 2003, Blyth Spartans signed Sadler.

== Coaching career ==
At the age of 21, Sadler entered coaching, joining Newcastle United in 2001. During his time at the club, Sadler was appointed reserve team manager, helping the side to win the Northumberland Senior Cup. A short spell at Norwich City under Glenn Roeder was followed by a return to North East England, where he was assistant manager at Blyth Spartans, Team Northumbria, and Gateshead. Sadler later joined Plymouth Argyle, eventually becoming first team coach under manager Peter Reid. In August 2011, Sadler joined Manchester City as under-18 coach. Following two years at Manchester City, Sadler took up a coaching role at Ukrainian club Tavriya Simferopol.

=== Leicester City ===
In 2014, Sadler joined Leicester City as a tactical analyst under Nigel Pearson.

In 2018, under the management of Claude Puel, he was appointed as first-team coach. On 26 February 2019, following the sacking of Puel, Sadler and joint-caretaker manager Mike Stowell oversaw a 2–1 home win over Brighton & Hove Albion.

In 2023, following the sacking of Brendan Rodgers, Sadler was once again appointed as joint-caretaker manager with Stowell. They managed the team in a 2–1 home defeat against Aston Villa on 4 April. After the arrival of the new manager Enzo Maresca, he left the club on 30 June.

=== Northern Ireland ===
On 28 August 2021, Sadler joined the backroom staff of the Northern Ireland national team in conjunction with his coaching role at Leicester City.

=== Celtic ===
Sadler was appointed first-team coach at Scottish Premiership club Celtic on 31 December 2023, reuniting with manager Brendan Rodgers. He left the club on 29 October 2025, following the departure of Rodgers.

== Managerial statistics ==
Managerial record by team and tenure
Team	From	To	Record				
Team	From	To	P	W	D	L	Win %
Leicester City (caretaker)	24 February 2019	26 February 2019	1	1	0	0	100.0
Leicester City (caretaker)	2 April 2023	10 April 2023	2	0	0	2	0.0
Total			3	1	0	2	33.3
