= 1999–2000 FA Premier League =

Football season in England

FA Premier League
- Season: 1999–2000
- Dates: 7 August 1999 – 14 May 2000
- Champions: Manchester United; 6th Premier League title 13th English title
- Relegated: Wimbledon; Sheffield Wednesday; Watford
- Champions League: Manchester United; Arsenal; Leeds United
- UEFA Cup: Liverpool; Chelsea; Leicester City
- Intertoto Cup: Aston Villa; Bradford City
- Matches: 380
- Goals: 1,060 (2.79 per match)
- Top goalscorer: Kevin Phillips (30 goals)
- Best goalkeeper: Ed de Goey (16 clean sheets)
- Biggest home win: Newcastle United 8–0 Sheffield Wednesday (19 September 1999)
- Biggest away win: Derby County 0–5 Sunderland (18 September 1999)
- Highest scoring: West Ham United 5–4 Bradford City (12 February 2000); Tottenham Hotspur 7–2 Southampton (11 March 2000)
- Longest winning run: 11 games Manchester United
- Longest unbeaten run: 16 games Chelsea
- Longest winless run: 11 games Sunderland; Watford
- Longest losing run: 8 games Wimbledon
- Highest attendance: 61,619; Manchester United 3–1 Derby County (11 March 2000)
- Lowest attendance: 8,248; Wimbledon 0–2 Sheffield Wednesday (12 April 2000)
- Total attendance: 11,677,585
- Average attendance: 30,730

The 1999–2000 FA Premier League (known as the FA Carling Premiership for sponsorship reasons) was the eighth season of the FA Premier League, and Manchester United secured their sixth Premiership title. Like the previous season, they lost only three league games all season. Unlike in the 1998–99 season, they won by a comfortable margin – 18 points as opposed to a single point.

Manchester United lost their defence of the European Cup following a 3–2 defeat against Real Madrid in the quarter-finals. The club had withdrawn from the 1999–2000 FA Cup to participate in the FIFA World Club Championship at the request of the FA who wanted Manchester United to compete to support England's bid to host the World Cup. Chelsea won the last FA Cup held at Wembley Stadium before its redevelopment. The League Cup final was won by Leicester City, for the second time in four seasons. In Europe, Leeds United reached the UEFA Cup semi-final and Arsenal were on the losing side to Galatasaray in the UEFA Cup final.

Only one newly promoted team suffered relegation: Watford, who finished in last place, and achieved a then record Premiership low of just 24 points (a record since broken by multiple teams), despite a decent start to their campaign which saw them beat both Liverpool (at Anfield) and Chelsea. The most successful promoted team was Sunderland, who finished seventh in the final table and spent much of the season pushing for a place in European competition. Bradford City, back in the top division for the first time since 1922, secured their Premiership survival on the last day of the season with a 1–0 win over Liverpool. The result meant that Liverpool lost out on a Champions League place, and Wimbledon were relegated after 14 years of top-division football. Second-from-bottom Sheffield Wednesday were relegated in their penultimate game of the season, having spent 15 of the previous 16 seasons in the top division. Wednesday's season included an 8–0 defeat at Newcastle. Amazingly Coventry City went all season without an away win but still managed to secure 14th place due to an impressive home record which saw them win 12 out of their 19 matches.

As well as Premiership champions Manchester United and runners-up Arsenal, third placed Leeds United qualified for the 2000–01 Champions League. UEFA Cup places went to fourth placed Liverpool, F.A Cup winners Chelsea, and League Cup winners Leicester City.

Promoted to the Premiership for 2000–01 were First Division champions Charlton Athletic, runners-up Manchester City and playoff winners Ipswich Town. For the first time since the formation of the Premiership, all of the promoted teams had been members of the Premiership before.

== Teams ==
Twenty teams competed in the league – the top seventeen teams from the previous season and the three teams promoted from the First Division. The promoted teams were Sunderland, Bradford City and Watford, who returned after absences of two, seventy-seven and eleven years respectively. This was also both Bradford City and Watford's first season in the Premier League. They replaced Charlton Athletic, Blackburn Rovers and Nottingham Forest, who were relegated to the First Division. Charlton Athletic and Nottingham Forest were immediately relegated after a season's presence, while Blackburn Rovers' seven-year top flight spell came to an end.

=== Stadiums and locations ===
Locations of the 1999–2000 Premier League teams
Greater London Premier League football clubs

Team	Location	Stadium	Capacity
Arsenal	London (Highbury)	Arsenal Stadium	38,419
Aston Villa	Birmingham	Villa Park	42,573
Bradford City	Bradford	Valley Parade	25,136
Chelsea	London (Fulham)	Stamford Bridge	42,055
Coventry City	Coventry	Highfield Road	23,489
Derby County	Derby	Pride Park Stadium	33,597
Everton	Liverpool (Walton)	Goodison Park	40,569
Leeds United	Leeds	Elland Road	40,242
Leicester City	Leicester	Filbert Street	22,000
Liverpool	Liverpool (Anfield)	Anfield	45,522
Manchester United	Manchester	Old Trafford	68,174
Middlesbrough	Middlesbrough	Riverside Stadium	35,049
Newcastle United	Newcastle upon Tyne	St James' Park	52,387
Sheffield Wednesday	Sheffield	Hillsborough Stadium	39,732
Southampton	Southampton	The Dell	15,200
Sunderland	Sunderland	Stadium of Light	49,000
Tottenham Hotspur	London (Tottenham)	White Hart Lane	36,240
Watford	Watford	Vicarage Road	19,920
West Ham United	London (Upton Park)	Boleyn Ground	35,647
Wimbledon	London (Selhurst)	Selhurst Park (Note: Due to Wimbledon lacking a home stadium, they played their home games at Selhurst Park, which is the home stadium of Crystal Palace.)	26,074

=== Personnel and kits ===
Team	Manager	Captain	Kit manufacturer	Shirt sponsor
Arsenal	(France) Arsène Wenger	(England) Tony Adams	Nike	Dreamcast/Sega
Aston Villa	(England) John Gregory	(England) Gareth Southgate	Reebok	LDV Vans
Bradford City	(England) Paul Jewell	(Scotland) Stuart McCall	Asics	JCT600
Chelsea	(Italy) Gianluca Vialli	(England) Dennis Wise	Umbro	Autoglass
Coventry City	(Scotland) Gordon Strachan	(Scotland) Gary McAllister	CCFC Garments	Subaru
Derby County	(England) Jim Smith	(Jamaica) Darryl Powell	Puma	EDS
Everton	(Scotland) Walter Smith	(England) Dave Watson	Umbro	One2One
Leeds United	(Republic of Ireland) David O'Leary	(South Africa) Lucas Radebe	Puma	Packard Bell
Leicester City	(Northern Ireland) Martin O'Neill	(Scotland) Matt Elliott	Fox Leisure	Walkers Crisps
Liverpool	(France) Gérard Houllier	(England) Jamie Redknapp	Reebok	Carlsberg Group
Manchester United	(Scotland) Sir Alex Ferguson	(Republic of Ireland) Roy Keane	Umbro	Sharp
Middlesbrough	(England) Bryan Robson	(England) Paul Ince	Erreà	BT Cellnet
Newcastle United	(England) Bobby Robson	(England) Alan Shearer	Adidas	Newcastle Brown Ale
Sheffield Wednesday	(Wales) Peter Shreeves (caretaker)	(England) Des Walker	Puma	Sanderson
Southampton	(England) Glenn Hoddle	(England) Matt Le Tissier	Saints	Friends Provident
Sunderland	(England) Peter Reid	(England) Steve Bould	Asics	Reg Vardy
Tottenham Hotspur	(Scotland) George Graham	(England) Sol Campbell	Adidas	Holsten
Watford	(England) Graham Taylor	(Wales) Rob Page	Le Coq Sportif	Phones4U
West Ham United	(England) Harry Redknapp	(Northern Ireland) Steve Lomas	Fila	Dr. Martens
Wimbledon	(England) Terry Burton	(Jamaica) Robbie Earle	Lotto	Tiny

- ^{1} The Dreamcast logo appeared on Arsenal's home shirt while the Sega logo appeared on their away shirt.

=== Managerial changes ===
Team	Outgoing manager	Manner of departure	Date of vacancy	Position in table	Incoming manager	Date of appointment
Wimbledon	(Republic of Ireland) Joe Kinnear	Resigned	9 June 1999	Pre-season	(Norway) Egil Olsen	9 June 1999
Newcastle United	(Netherlands) Ruud Gullit	Resigned	28 August 1999	19th	(England) Bobby Robson	2 September 1999
Southampton	(England) Dave Jones	Contract terminated	27 January 2000 (Note: Jones was put on gardening leave on 27 January, with Glenn Hoddle taking over as interim manager. At the end of the season, Jones's contract was terminated, and Hoddle took over the position permanently.)	17th	(England) Glenn Hoddle	28 January 2000
Sheffield Wednesday	(England) Danny Wilson	Sacked	21 March 2000	19th	(Wales) Peter Shreeves (caretaker)	21 March 2000
Wimbledon	(Norway) Egil Olsen	Sacked	1 May 2000	18th	(England) Terry Burton	1 May 2000

== League table ==
Pos	Team	Pld	W	D	L	GF	GA	GD	Pts	Qualification or relegation
1	Manchester United (C)	38	28	7	3	97	45	+52	91	Qualification for the Champions League first group stage
2	Arsenal	38	22	7	9	73	43	+30	73	Qualification for the Champions League first group stage
3	Leeds United	38	21	6	11	58	43	+15	69	Qualification for the Champions League third qualifying round
4	Liverpool	38	19	10	9	51	30	+21	67	Qualification for the UEFA Cup first round (Note: Chelsea qualified for the UEFA Cup as FA Cup winners.)
5	Chelsea	38	18	11	9	53	34	+19	65	Qualification for the UEFA Cup first round
6	Aston Villa	38	15	13	10	46	35	+11	58	Qualification for the Intertoto Cup third round
7	Sunderland	38	16	10	12	57	56	+1	58	
8	Leicester City	38	16	7	15	55	55	0	55	Qualification for the UEFA Cup first round (Note: Leicester City qualified for the UEFA Cup as League Cup winners.)
9	West Ham United	38	15	10	13	52	53	−1	55	
10	Tottenham Hotspur	38	15	8	15	57	49	+8	53	
11	Newcastle United	38	14	10	14	63	54	+9	52	
12	Middlesbrough	38	14	10	14	46	52	−6	52	
13	Everton	38	12	14	12	59	49	+10	50	
14	Coventry City	38	12	8	18	47	54	−7	44	
15	Southampton	38	12	8	18	45	62	−17	44	
16	Derby County	38	9	11	18	44	57	−13	38	
17	Bradford City	38	9	9	20	38	68	−30	36	Qualification for the Intertoto Cup second round
18	Wimbledon (R)	38	7	12	19	46	74	−28	33	Relegation to the Football League First Division
19	Sheffield Wednesday (R)	38	8	7	23	38	70	−32	31	Relegation to the Football League First Division
20	Watford (R)	38	6	6	26	35	77	−42	24	Relegation to the Football League First Division

Source: Premier League
Rules for classification: 1) points; 2) goal difference; 3) number of goals scored.
(C) Champions; (R) Relegated

== Results ==
Home \ Away	ARS	AVL	BRA	CHE	COV	DER	EVE	LEE	LEI	LIV	MUN	MID	NEW	SHW	SOU	SUN	TOT	WAT	WHU	WIM
Arsenal		3–1	2–0	2–1	3–0	2–1	4–1	2–0	2–1	0–1	1–2	5–1	0–0	3–3	3–1	4–1	2–1	1–0	2–1	1–1
Aston Villa	1–1		1–0	0–0	1–0	2–0	3–0	1–0	2–2	0–0	0–1	1–0	0–1	2–1	0–1	1–1	1–1	4–0	2–2	1–1
Bradford City	2–1	1–1		1–1	1–1	4–4	0–0	1–2	3–1	1–0	0–4	1–1	2–0	1–1	1–2	0–4	1–1	3–2	0–3	3–0
Chelsea	2–3	1–0	1–0		2–1	4–0	1–1	0–2	1–1	2–0	5–0	1–1	1–0	3–0	1–1	4–0	1–0	2–1	0–0	3–1
Coventry City	3–2	2–1	4–0	2–2		2–0	1–0	3–4	0–1	0–3	1–2	2–1	4–1	4–1	0–1	3–2	0–1	4–0	1–0	2–0
Derby County	1–2	0–2	0–1	3–1	0–0		1–0	0–1	3–0	0–2	1–2	1–3	0–0	3–3	2–0	0–5	0–1	2–0	1–2	4–0
Everton	0–1	0–0	4–0	1–1	1–1	2–1		4–4	2–2	0–0	1–1	0–2	0–2	1–1	4–1	5–0	2–2	4–2	1–0	4–0
Leeds United	0–4	1–2	2–1	0–1	3–0	0–0	1–1		2–1	1–2	0–1	2–0	3–2	2–0	1–0	2–1	1–0	3–1	1–0	4–1
Leicester City	0–3	3–1	3–0	2–2	1–0	0–1	1–1	2–1		2–2	0–2	2–1	1–2	3–0	2–1	5–2	0–1	1–0	1–3	2–1
Liverpool	2–0	0–0	3–1	1–0	2–0	2–0	0–1	3–1	0–2		2–3	0–0	2–1	4–1	0–0	1–1	2–0	0–1	1–0	3–1
Manchester United	1–1	3–0	4–0	3–2	3–2	3–1	5–1	2–0	2–0	1–1		1–0	5–1	4–0	3–3	4–0	3–1	4–1	7–1	1–1
Middlesbrough	2–1	0–4	0–1	0–1	2–0	1–4	2–1	0–0	0–3	1–0	3–4		2–2	1–0	3–2	1–1	2–1	1–1	2–0	0–0
Newcastle United	4–2	0–1	2–0	0–1	2–0	2–0	1–1	2–2	0–2	2–2	3–0	2–1		8–0	5–0	1–2	2–1	1–0	2–2	3–3
Sheffield Wednesday	1–1	0–1	2–0	1–0	0–0	0–2	0–2	0–3	4–0	1–2	0–1	1–0	0–2		0–1	0–2	1–2	2–2	3–1	5–1
Southampton	0–1	2–0	1–0	1–2	0–0	3–3	2–0	0–3	1–2	1–1	1–3	1–1	4–2	2–0		1–2	0–1	2–0	2–1	2–0
Sunderland	0–0	2–1	0–1	4–1	1–1	1–1	2–1	1–2	2–0	0–2	2–2	1–1	2–2	1–0	2–0		2–1	2–0	1–0	2–1
Tottenham Hotspur	2–1	2–4	1–1	0–1	3–2	1–1	3–2	1–2	2–3	1–0	3–1	2–3	3–1	0–1	7–2	3–1		4–0	0–0	2–0
Watford	2–3	0–1	1–0	1–0	1–0	0–0	1–3	1–2	1–1	2–3	2–3	1–3	1–1	1–0	3–2	2–3	1–1		1–2	2–3
West Ham United	2–1	1–1	5–4	0–0	5–0	1–1	0–4	0–0	2–1	1–0	2–4	0–1	2–1	4–3	2–0	1–1	1–0	1–0		2–1
Wimbledon	1–3	2–2	3–2	0–1	1–1	2–2	0–3	2–0	2–1	1–2	2–2	2–3	2–0	0–2	1–1	1–0	1–1	5–0	2–2	

Source: Premier League
Legend: Blue = home team win; Yellow = draw; Red = away team win.

== Season statistics ==
=== Scoring ===
==== Top scorers ====
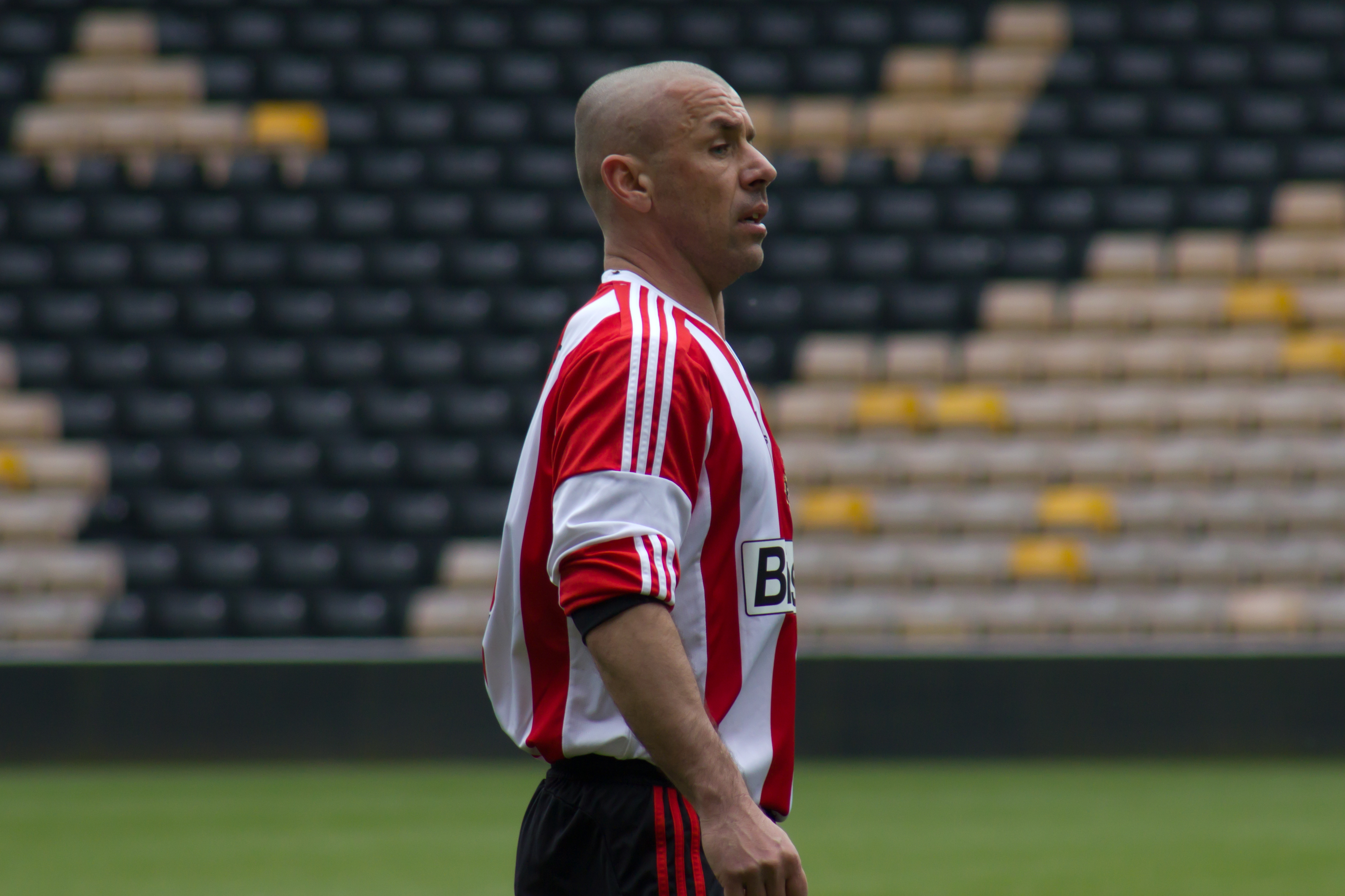
Sunderland's Kevin Phillips was the top scorer, with 30 goals.

Rank	Player	Club	Goals
1	(England) Kevin Phillips	Sunderland	30
2	(England) Alan Shearer	Newcastle United	23
3	(Trinidad and Tobago) Dwight Yorke	Manchester United	20
4	(England) Michael Bridges	Leeds United	19
4	(England) Andy Cole	Manchester United	19
6	(France) Thierry Henry	Arsenal	17
7	(Italy) Paolo Di Canio	West Ham United	16
8	(England) Chris Armstrong	Tottenham Hotspur	14
8	(Norway) Steffen Iversen	Tottenham Hotspur	14
8	(Republic of Ireland) Niall Quinn	Sunderland	14

==== Hat-tricks ====
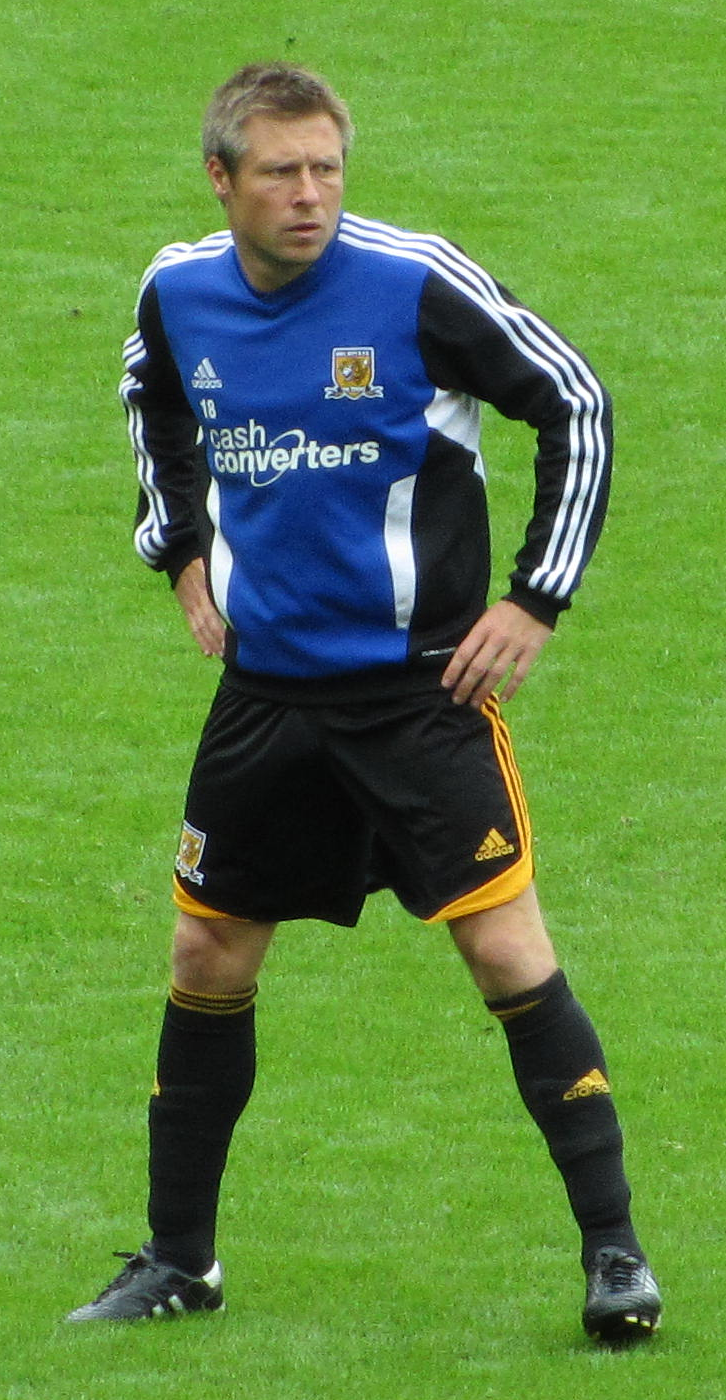
The 1999–2000 Premier League season would see Everton's Nick Barmby score his one and only hat-trick during his professional career.

Player	For	Against	Result	Date	Ref
(England) Michael Bridges	Leeds United	Southampton	3–0 (A)	11 August 1999	
(England) Andy Cole^{4}	Manchester United	Newcastle United	5–1 (H)	30 August 1999	
(England) Kevin Phillips	Sunderland	Derby County	5–0 (A)	18 September 1999	
(England) Alan Shearer^{5}	Newcastle United	Sheffield Wednesday	8–0 (H)	19 September 1999	
(Nigeria) Nwankwo Kanu	Arsenal	Chelsea	3–2 (A)	23 October 1999	
(Netherlands) Marc Overmars	Arsenal	Middlesbrough	5–1 (H)	21 November 1999	
(Norway) Ole Gunnar Solskjær^{4} ^{P}	Manchester United	Everton	5–1 (H)	4 December 1999	
(England) Nick Barmby	Everton	West Ham United	4–0 (A)	26 February 2000	
(England) Stan Collymore	Leicester City	Sunderland	5–2 (H)	5 March 2000	
(Norway) Steffen Iversen	Tottenham Hotspur	Southampton	7–2 (H)	11 March 2000	
(Trinidad and Tobago) Dwight Yorke	Manchester United	Derby County	3–1 (H)	11 March 2000	
(England) Paul Scholes	Manchester United	West Ham United	7–1 (H)	1 April 2000	
(England) Dean Windass	Bradford City	Derby County	4–4 (H)	21 April 2000	

Note: ^{5} Player scored 5 goals; ^{4} Player scored 4 goals; ^{P} Player scored a perfect hat-trick; (H) – Home; (A) – Away

==== Top assists ====
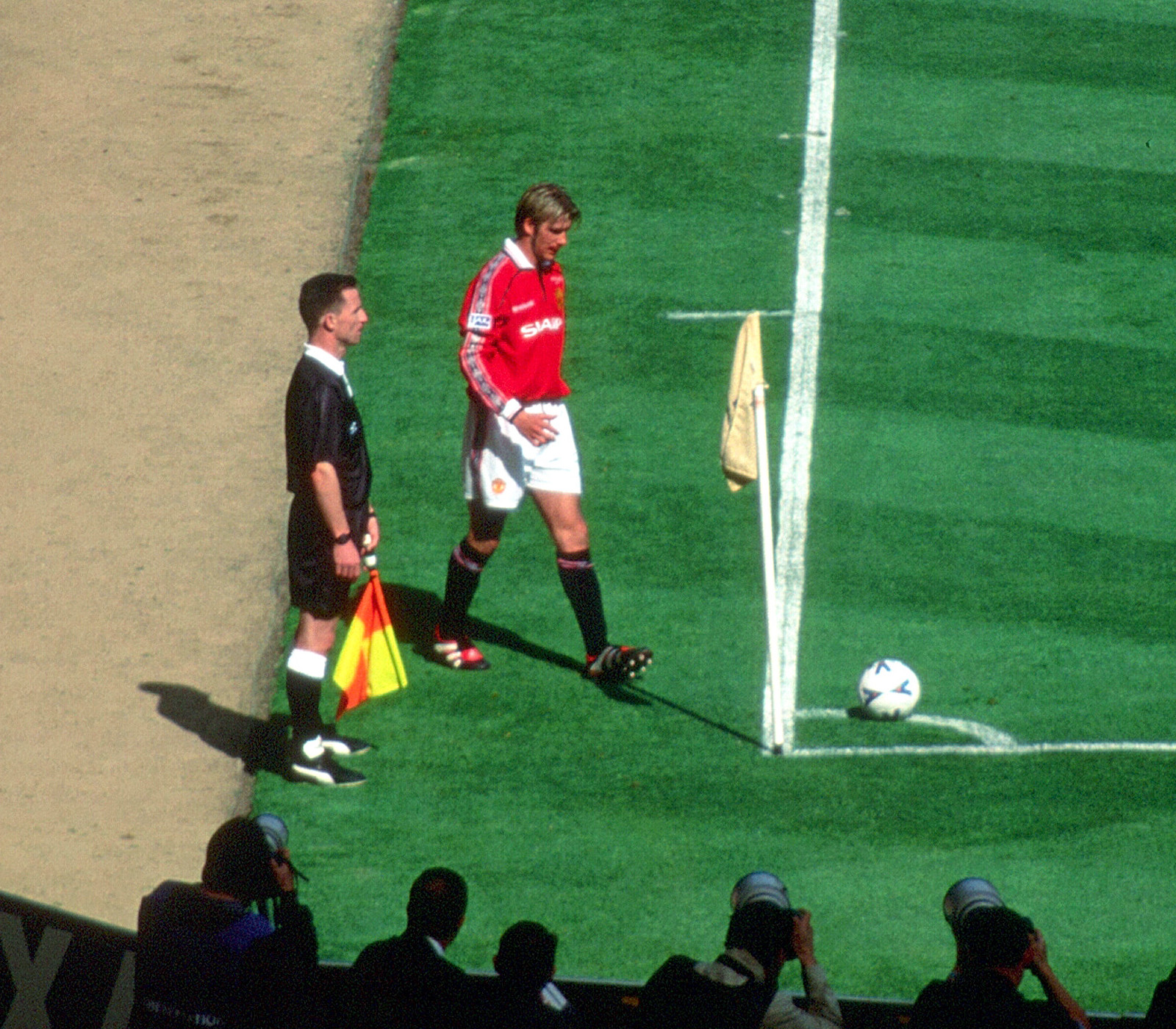
Manchester United's David Beckham was the joint top assist provider with 16 assists for the club in the 1999–2000 Premier League season.

Rank	Player	Club	Assists
1	(England) David Beckham	Manchester United	16
1	(Peru) Nolberto Solano	Newcastle United	16
3	(Italy) Paolo Di Canio	West Ham United	13
4	(Wales) Ryan Giggs	Manchester United	12
5	(Netherlands) Dennis Bergkamp	Arsenal	9
6	(England) Nick Barmby	Everton	8
6	(France) Thierry Henry	Arsenal	8
6	(Norway) Steffen Iversen	Tottenham Hotspur	8
6	(Netherlands) Wim Jonk	Sheffield Wednesday	8
6	(England) Paul Merson	Aston Villa	8

== Awards ==
=== Monthly awards ===
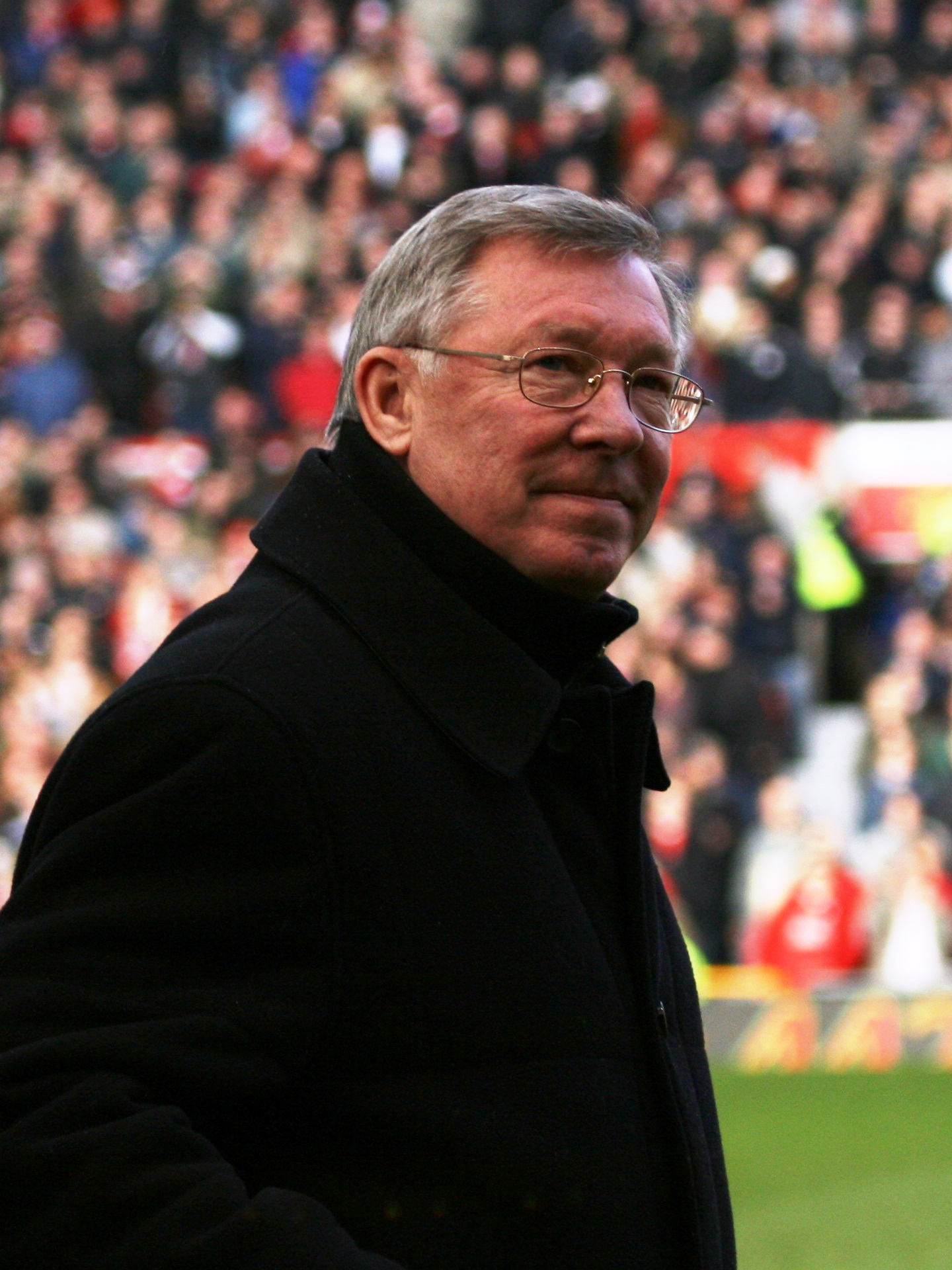
Alex Ferguson was Manager of the Month three times during the 1999–2000 Premier League season, and was later named Manager of the Season.

Month	Manager of the Month		Player of the Month	
Month	Manager	Club	Player	Club
August	(Scotland) Alex Ferguson	Manchester United	(Republic of Ireland) Robbie Keane	Coventry City
September	(Scotland) Walter Smith	Everton	(England) Muzzy Izzet	Leicester City
October	(England) Peter Reid	Sunderland	(England) Kevin Phillips	Sunderland
November	(Northern Ireland) Martin O'Neill	Leicester City	(Finland) Sami Hyypiä	Liverpool
December	(France) Gérard Houllier	Liverpool	(Republic of Ireland) Roy Keane	Manchester United
January	(Northern Ireland) Danny Wilson	Sheffield Wednesday	(England) Gareth Southgate	Aston Villa
February	(England) Bobby Robson	Newcastle United	(England) Paul Merson	Aston Villa
March	(Scotland) Alex Ferguson	Manchester United	(Trinidad and Tobago) Dwight Yorke	Manchester United
April	(Scotland) Alex Ferguson	Manchester United	(France) Thierry Henry	Arsenal

=== Annual awards ===
Award	Winner	Club
Premier League Manager of the Season	(Scotland) Alex Ferguson	Manchester United
Premier League Player of the Season	(England) Kevin Phillips	Sunderland
PFA Players' Player of the Year	(Republic of Ireland) Roy Keane	Manchester United
PFA Young Player of the Year	(Australia) Harry Kewell	Leeds United
FWA Footballer of the Year	(Republic of Ireland) Roy Keane	Manchester United

PFA Team of the Year
Goalkeeper	(England) Nigel Martyn (Leeds United)			
Defence	(Republic of Ireland) Gary Kelly (Leeds United)	(Netherlands) Jaap Stam (Manchester United)	(Finland) Sami Hyypiä (Liverpool)	(Republic of Ireland) Ian Harte (Leeds United)
Midfield	(England) David Beckham (Manchester United)	(Republic of Ireland) Roy Keane (Manchester United)	(France) Patrick Vieira (Arsenal)	(Australia) Harry Kewell (Leeds United)
Attack	(England) Andy Cole (Manchester United)		(England) Kevin Phillips (Sunderland)	

== Attendances ==
No.	Club	Matches	Total attendance	Average
1	Manchester United	19	1,102,323	58,017
2	Liverpool FC	19	837,402	44,074
3	Sunderland AFC	19	776,131	40,849
4	Leeds United	19	743,942	39,155
5	Arsenal FC	19	722,630	38,033
6	Newcastle United	19	690,112	36,322
7	Tottenham Hotspur	19	663,324	34,912
8	Everton FC	19	661,728	34,828
9	Chelsea FC	19	656,110	34,532
10	Middlesbrough FC	19	634,474	33,393
11	Aston Villa	19	602,237	31,697
12	Derby County	19	557,678	29,351
13	West Ham United	19	476,769	25,093
14	Sheffield Wednesday	19	472,253	24,855
15	Coventry City	19	395,369	20,809
16	Leicester City	19	376,720	19,827
17	Watford FC	19	352,338	18,544
18	Bradford City	19	342,572	18,030
19	Wimbledon FC	19	325,974	17,157
20	Southampton FC	19	287,499	15,132
