= Peter Shreeves =

Welsh footballer, manager, and coach

Personal information
- Date of birth: 30 November 1940 (age 85)
- Place of birth: Neath, Wales
- Position: Inside forward

Senior career*
Years	Team	Apps	(Gls)
–1959	Finchley		
1959–1966	Reading	113	(17)
1966–1969	Chelmsford City		
1969–1972	Wimbledon	82	(2)
1972–1973	Stevenage Athletic		
Total		195	(19)

Managerial career
- 1984–1986: Tottenham Hotspur
- 1991–1992: Tottenham Hotspur
- 1997: Sheffield Wednesday (caretaker)
- 2000–2001: Sheffield Wednesday
- 2002–2003: Barnet
- 2009: Grays Athletic (caretaker)
- * Club domestic league appearances and goals

Peter Shreeves (born 30 November 1940) is a Welsh former football player and coach.

== Career ==
Shreeves was born in Neath in South Wales where his mother had been evacuated to during the early stages of World War II, but was brought up in Islington, London. He began his career with non-league Finchley from where he joined Reading in January 1959. He made over 100 league appearances for Reading over the next seven years, but his professional career was curtailed by a broken leg. He left Reading in 1966 to join Southern League club Chelmsford City.

In the summer of 1969, Shreeves joined Wimbledon where he remained until taking up a coaching post at Charlton Athletic in 1974. Later that year he joined Tottenham Hotspur as youth coach. In 1977, Tottenham manager Keith Burkinshaw promoted him to manager of the reserve team, and then as his assistant in 1980.

In June 1984, Shreeves was promoted to the manager's seat after Burkinshaw's resignation and took Spurs to third place in the league at the end of his first season as manager. This would normally have earned them a UEFA Cup place, but the ban on English clubs in European competition began at this time due to the Heysel Stadium disaster. Tottenham finished 10th the following season and Shreeves was sacked in favour of David Pleat in May 1986.

In August that year Shreeves joined the coaching staff at Queens Park Rangers and in December 1988 was made assistant manager after Trevor Francis had been appointed player-manager. He then worked as assistant to Steve Perryman at Watford before working as Wales assistant manager under Terry Yorath.

Shreeves returned to Tottenham as manager in July 1991 after Terry Venables had moved upstairs to become Chief Executive. Tottenham had won the FA Cup under Venables, but Shreeves was sacked after just one season with Tottenham finishing 15th in the league.

From 1993 to 1996 he was assistant manager at Chelsea before Glenn Hoddle became England manager and Ruud Gullit did not include Shreeves in his management team.

Shreeves then became assistant manager to David Pleat at Sheffield Wednesday, and worked alongside subsequent manager Ron Atkinson. He remained for a short while under the next manager, Danny Wilson, but left to re-join Atkinson at Nottingham Forest, where the duo were unable to prevent the club from being relegated. Shreeves acted as interim manager of the club for a short while following Atkinson's retirement at the end of the season, but left upon the arrival of David Platt as manager.

He was out of work until March 2000, when he was asked to return to Sheffield Wednesday as caretaker manager after Danny Wilson was sacked. The Owls were struggling at the bottom of the Premiership, and despite managing a few decent results, Shreeves was unable to prevent relegation. He did not get the manager's job on a permanent basis, but was retained as assistant manager to Paul Jewell, and got the job permanently when Jewell was sacked in February 2001. The Owls were looking in real danger of a second successive relegation at the time, but Shreeves kept them clear, earning the Manager of the Month award for March 2001 in the process. However, he resigned in October 2001 with the Owls struggling in the league.

Shreeves made a return to football as manager of Conference side Barnet in February 2002, earning the Conference Manager of the Month Award for his first month in charge. However, he resigned after just one year in charge, with the Bees struggling to make the Conference play-offs.

In June 2009 Shreeves was appointed Director of Football at Grays Athletic, and the club appointed him as caretaker manager following Gary Phillips being placed on gardening leave on 10 September, until appointing a new manager on 16 September.

On 26 January 2010, Shreeves returned to Barnet as a coach. He left the Bees after Ian Hendon was sacked in April 2010.

== Name ==
There is some confusion about his name. His name is variously spelled "Shreeve" and "Shreeves" in different sources, as he mentions in an interview for the 2008 book "The Boys From White Hart Lane" by Martin Cloake and Adam Powley. The Tottenham Hotspur website still gives the spelling "Shreeves". He says "My real name is Shreeve, but over the years I've had so many people getting it wrong that in the end I thought, 'why not – it's Shreeves.' I've looked in the club handbooks and I see that one year my name is spelt with an 's' at the end, the next it is 'Shreeve'".

== Family ==
In 2020 Peter Shreeves family faced several criminal charges. His daughter Joanne Shreeves, was found guilty of Criminal damage, Common assault and Threatening behaviour at Stratford's magistrates court in 2023. Shreeves was seen on CCTV whilst his daughter Joanne allegedly threw cement at their neighbour's. At Thames magistrates court on 3rd of November 2023, Peter's wife Carole Shreeves was also cautioned for £4,829 of Criminal damage against their neighbours in 2023.
