= 2021–22 EFL Championship =

18th season of the Football League Championship

EFL Championship
- Season: 2021–22
- Dates: 6 August 2021 – 7 May 2022
- Champions: Fulham; 1st Championship title 3rd 2nd tier title
- Promoted: Fulham; Bournemouth; Nottingham Forest
- Relegated: Peterborough United; Derby County; Barnsley
- Matches: 552
- Goals: 1,385 (2.51 per match)
- Top goalscorer: Aleksandar Mitrović (Fulham) (43 goals)
- Biggest home win: Fulham 7–0; Luton Town (2 May 2022)
- Biggest away win: Blackburn Rovers 0–7 Fulham (3 November 2021); Reading 0–7 Fulham (11 January 2022)
- Highest scoring: Sheffield United 6–2 Peterborough United (11 September 2021); Fulham 6–2 Bristol City (15 January 2022); Fulham 6–2; Birmingham City (18 January 2022); Reading 4–4; Swansea City (18 April 2022)
- Longest winning run: Fulham (7 games)
- Longest unbeaten run: Huddersfield Town (17 games)
- Longest winless run: Peterborough United (15 games)
- Longest losing run: Cardiff City (8 games)
- Highest attendance: 32,211; Derby County 2–2 Birmingham City (30 January 2022)
- Lowest attendance: 6,832; Peterborough United 2–3 Swansea City (16 March 2022)
- Total attendance: 9,310,401
- Average attendance: 16,867

The 2021–22 EFL Championship (referred to as the Sky Bet Championship for sponsorship reasons) was the 6th season of the EFL Championship under its current title and the 30th season under its current league division format.

== Team changes ==
The following teams have changed division since the 2020–21 season:

=== To Championship ===
Promoted from League One

- Hull City
- Peterborough United
- Blackpool

Relegated from the Premier League

- Fulham
- West Bromwich Albion
- Sheffield United

=== From Championship ===
Promoted to the Premier League

- Norwich City
- Watford
- Brentford

Relegated to League One

- Wycombe Wanderers
- Rotherham United
- Sheffield Wednesday

== Stadiums ==
Locations of the 2021–22 EFL Championship teams
Greater London EFL Championship football clubs

Team	Location	Stadium	Capacity
Bournemouth	Bournemouth	Dean Court	11,364
Barnsley	Barnsley	Oakwell	23,287
Birmingham City	Birmingham	St Andrew's	29,409
Blackburn Rovers	Blackburn	Ewood Park	31,367
Blackpool	Blackpool	Bloomfield Road	17,338
Bristol City	Bristol	Ashton Gate Stadium	27,000
Cardiff City	Cardiff	Cardiff City Stadium	33,280
Coventry City	Coventry	Coventry Building Society Arena	32,609
Derby County	Derby	Pride Park Stadium	33,600
Fulham	London (Fulham)	Craven Cottage	19,359
Huddersfield Town	Huddersfield	Kirklees Stadium	24,121
Hull City	Kingston upon Hull	MKM Stadium	25,586
Luton Town	Luton	Kenilworth Road	10,356
Middlesbrough	Middlesbrough	Riverside Stadium	34,742
Millwall	London (South Bermondsey)	The Den	20,146
Nottingham Forest	West Bridgford	City Ground	30,445
Peterborough United	Peterborough	London Road Stadium	15,314
Preston North End	Preston	Deepdale	23,404
Queens Park Rangers	London (White City)	Loftus Road	18,439
Reading	Reading	Select Car Leasing Stadium	24,161
Sheffield United	Sheffield	Bramall Lane	32,050
Stoke City	Stoke-on-Trent	bet365 Stadium	30,089
Swansea City	Swansea	Swansea.com Stadium	21,088
West Bromwich Albion	West Bromwich	The Hawthorns	26,850

== Personnel and sponsoring ==
Team	Manager	Captain	Kit manufacturer	Shirt sponsor
Bournemouth	(England) Scott Parker	(England) Lloyd Kelly	(England) Umbro	MSP Capital
Barnsley	(Republic of Ireland) Martin Devaney (Interim)	(England) Cauley Woodrow	(Germany) Puma	The Investment Room
Birmingham City	(England) Lee Bowyer	(England) Troy Deeney	(United States) Nike	BoyleSports
Blackburn Rovers	(England) Tony Mowbray	(Republic of Ireland) Darragh Lenihan	(Italy) Macron	Totally Wicked^{1}
Blackpool	(England) Neil Critchley	(Wales) Chris Maxwell	(Germany) Puma	Blackpool Council (Home: "VisitBlackpool.com"; Away: "Get Vocal")
Bristol City	(England) Nigel Pearson	(England) Dan Bentley	(Denmark) Hummel	MansionBet
Cardiff City	(Wales) Steve Morison	(England) Sean Morrison	(Germany) Adidas	Tourism Malaysia
Coventry City	(England) Mark Robins	(Scotland) Liam Kelly	(Denmark) Hummel	BoyleSports
Derby County	(England) Wayne Rooney	(Wales) Tom Lawrence	(England) Umbro	32Red
Fulham	(Portugal) Marco Silva	(Scotland) Tom Cairney	(Germany) Adidas	World Mobile
Huddersfield Town	(Spain) Carlos Corberán	(England) Jonathan Hogg	(England) Umbro	Utilita
Hull City	(Georgia (country)) Shota Arveladze	(England) Richie Smallwood	(England) Umbro	Giacom
Luton Town	(Wales) Nathan Jones	(England) Sonny Bradley	(England) Umbro	Utilita (home)^{2} Star Platforms (away); Ryebridge (third)
Middlesbrough	(England) Chris Wilder	(England) Jonny Howson	(Denmark) Hummel	32Red
Millwall	(England) Gary Rowett	(Republic of Ireland) Alex Pearce	(Italy) Macron	Huski Chocolate
Nottingham Forest	(Wales) Steve Cooper	(England) Lewis Grabban	(Italy) Macron	BOXT
Peterborough United	(Northern Ireland) Grant McCann	(Grenada) Oliver Norburn	(Germany) Puma	Mick George Group
Preston North End	(England) Ryan Lowe	(Republic of Ireland) Alan Browne	(United States) Nike	PAR Group
Queens Park Rangers	(England) Mark Warburton	(Norway) Stefan Johansen	(Italy) Erreà	Ashville Holdings
Reading	(England) Paul Ince (Interim) (Barbados) Michael Gilkes (Interim)	(England) Michael Morrison	(Italy) Macron	Select Car Leasing
Sheffield United	(England) Paul Heckingbottom	(England) Billy Sharp	(Germany) Adidas	Randox
Stoke City	(Northern Ireland) Michael O'Neill	(England) Lewis Baker	(Italy) Macron	bet365
Swansea City	(Scotland) Russell Martin	(England) Matt Grimes	(Spain) Joma	Swansea University
West Bromwich Albion	(England) Steve Bruce	(England) Jake Livermore	(Germany) Puma	Ideal Heating

1. Blackburn Rovers' shirt sponsor was Recoverite Compression until 18 January 2022 when the deal was ended prematurely.
2. Luton Town's home shirt sponsor was JB Developments until 18 February 2022 when the deal was ended prematurely.

== Managerial changes ==
Team	Outgoing manager	Manner of departure	Date of vacancy	Position in table	Incoming manager	Date of appointment
West Bromwich Albion	(England) Sam Allardyce	Resigned	23 May 2021	Pre-season	(France) Valérien Ismaël	24 June 2021
Sheffield United	(England) Paul Heckingbottom	End of caretaker spell	23 May 2021	Pre-season	(Serbia) Slaviša Jokanović	27 May 2021
Barnsley	(France) Valérien Ismaël	Signed by West Bromwich Albion	24 June 2021	Pre-season	(Austria) Markus Schopp	29 June 2021
Fulham	(England) Scott Parker	Signed by Bournemouth	28 June 2021	Pre-season	(Portugal) Marco Silva	1 July 2021
Bournemouth	(England) Jonathan Woodgate	End of contract	28 June 2021	Pre-season	(England) Scott Parker	28 June 2021
Swansea City	(Wales) Steve Cooper	Mutual consent	21 July 2021	Pre-season	(Scotland) Russell Martin	1 August 2021
Nottingham Forest	(Republic of Ireland) Chris Hughton	Sacked	16 September 2021	24th	(Wales) Steve Cooper	21 September 2021
Cardiff City	(Republic of Ireland) Mick McCarthy	Mutual consent	23 October 2021	21st	(Wales) Steve Morison	12 November 2021
Barnsley	(Austria) Markus Schopp	Sacked	1 November 2021	23rd	(Sweden) Poya Asbaghi	17 November 2021
Middlesbrough	(England) Neil Warnock	Mutual consent	6 November 2021	14th	(England) Chris Wilder	7 November 2021
Sheffield United	(Serbia) Slaviša Jokanović	Sacked	25 November 2021	16th	(England) Paul Heckingbottom	25 November 2021
Preston North End	(Scotland) Frankie McAvoy	Sacked	6 December 2021	18th	(England) Ryan Lowe	7 December 2021
Hull City	(Northern Ireland) Grant McCann	Sacked	25 January 2022	19th	(Georgia (country)) Shota Arveladze	27 January 2022
West Bromwich Albion	(France) Valérien Ismaël	Sacked	2 February 2022	5th	(England) Steve Bruce	3 February 2022
Reading	(Serbia) Veljko Paunović	Mutual consent	19 February 2022	21st	(England) Paul Ince (Interim) (Barbados) Michael Gilkes (Interim)	19 February 2022
Peterborough United	(Scotland) Darren Ferguson	Resigned	20 February 2022	23rd	(Northern Ireland) Grant McCann	24 February 2022
Barnsley	(Sweden) Poya Asbaghi	Mutual consent	24 April 2022	24th	(Republic of Ireland) Martin Devaney (Interim)	24 April 2022

== League table ==
Pos	Team	Pld	W	D	L	GF	GA	GD	Pts	Promotion, qualification or relegation
1	Fulham (C, P)	46	27	9	10	106	43	+63	90	Promotion to the Premier League
2	Bournemouth (P)	46	25	13	8	74	39	+35	88	Promotion to the Premier League
3	Huddersfield Town	46	23	13	10	64	47	+17	82	Qualification for Championship play-offs
4	Nottingham Forest (O, P)	46	23	11	12	73	40	+33	80	Qualification for Championship play-offs
5	Sheffield United	46	21	12	13	63	45	+18	75	Qualification for Championship play-offs
6	Luton Town	46	21	12	13	63	55	+8	75	Qualification for Championship play-offs
7	Middlesbrough	46	20	10	16	59	50	+9	70	
8	Blackburn Rovers	46	19	12	15	59	50	+9	69	
9	Millwall	46	18	15	13	53	45	+8	69	
10	West Bromwich Albion	46	18	13	15	52	45	+7	67	
11	Queens Park Rangers	46	19	9	18	60	59	+1	66	
12	Coventry City	46	17	13	16	60	59	+1	64	
13	Preston North End	46	16	16	14	52	56	−4	64	
14	Stoke City	46	17	11	18	57	52	+5	62	
15	Swansea City	46	16	13	17	58	68	−10	61	
16	Blackpool	46	16	12	18	54	58	−4	60	
17	Bristol City	46	15	10	21	62	77	−15	55	
18	Cardiff City	46	15	8	23	50	68	−18	53	
19	Hull City	46	14	9	23	41	54	−13	51	
20	Birmingham City	46	11	14	21	50	75	−25	47	
21	Reading	46	13	8	25	54	87	−33	41 (Note: Reading were deducted 6 points for breach of profit and sustainability regulations.)	
22	Peterborough United (R)	46	9	10	27	43	87	−44	37	Relegation to EFL League One
23	Derby County (R)	46	14	13	19	45	53	−8	34 (Note: Derby County were deducted 12 points for entering administration, and a further 9 points for financial irregularities.)	Relegation to EFL League One
24	Barnsley (R)	46	6	12	28	33	73	−40	30	Relegation to EFL League One

Source: EFL Official Website
Rules for classification: 1) Points; 2) Goal difference; 3) Number of goals scored; 4) Head-to-head results; 5) Wins; 6) Away goals; 7) Penalty points (sec 9.5); 8) 12-point sending off offences
(C) Champions; (O) Play-off winners; (P) Promoted; (R) Relegated

== Play-offs ==
Semi-finals
3	Huddersfield Town	1	1	2
6	Luton Town	1	0	1
4	Nottingham Forest	2	1	3 (3)
5	Sheffield United	1	2	3 (2)

Final
3	Huddersfield Town	0
4	Nottingham Forest	1

First leg

13 May 2022
19:45

Luton Town	1–1	Huddersfield Town
Bradley 30'	Report	Sinani 12'

Kenilworth Road, Luton
Attendance: 10,005
Referee: Robert Jones
14 May 2022
15:00

Sheffield United	1–2	Nottingham Forest
Berge 90+1'	Report	Colback 10'; Johnson 71'

Bramall Lane, Sheffield
Attendance: 30,225
Referee: Andre Marriner

Second leg

16 May 2022
19:45

Huddersfield Town	1–0	Luton Town
Rhodes 82'	Report

Kirklees Stadium, Huddersfield
Attendance: 23,507
Referee: Peter Bankes

Huddersfield Town won 2–1 on aggregate.

17 May 2022
19:45

Nottingham Forest	1–2 (a.e.t.)	Sheffield United
Johnson 19'	Report	Gibbs-White 47'; Fleck 75'
Penalties
Johnson (penalty scored); Cafú (penalty scored); Cook (penalty scored); Lolley (penalty missed)	3–2	(penalty missed) Norwood; (penalty missed) Hourihane; (penalty scored) Berge; (penalty scored) Ndiaye; (penalty missed) Gibbs-White

City Ground, West Bridgford
Attendance: 29,015
Referee: Michael Oliver

3–3 on aggregate. Nottingham Forest won 3–2 on penalties.

=== Final ===
29 May 2022
16:30 BST

Huddersfield Town	0–1	Nottingham Forest
	Report	Colwill 43' (o.g.)

Wembley Stadium, London
Attendance: 80,019
Referee: Jon Moss

== Results ==
Home \ Away	BOU	BAR	BIR	BLA	BLP	BRI	CAR	COV	DER	FUL	HUD	HUL	LUT	MID	MIL	NTF	PET	PNE	QPR	REA	SHU	STO	SWA	WBA
Bournemouth	—	3–0	3–1	0–2	2–2	3–2	3–0	2–2	2–0	1–1	3–0	0–1	2–1	0–0	1–0	1–0	1–1	1–2	2–1	1–1	2–1	2–1	4–0	2–2
Barnsley	0–1	—	1–1	0–0	0–2	2–0	0–1	1–0	2–1	1–1	1–1	0–2	0–1	3–2	0–1	1–3	0–2	1–3	1–0	1–1	2–3	1–1	0–2	0–0
Birmingham City	0–2	2–1	—	1–2	1–0	3–0	2–2	2–4	2–0	1–4	0–2	0–0	3–0	0–2	2–2	0–3	2–2	0–0	1–2	1–2	1–2	0–0	2–1	1–0
Blackburn Rovers	0–3	2–1	4–0	—	1–1	0–1	5–1	2–2	3–1	0–7	0–0	2–0	2–2	1–0	0–0	0–2	4–0	1–0	1–0	2–0	3–1	0–1	2–1	1–2
Blackpool	1–2	1–0	6–1	2–1	—	3–1	0–2	0–1	0–2	1–0	0–3	1–0	0–3	1–2	1–0	1–4	3–1	2–0	1–1	4–1	0–0	0–1	1–0	0–0
Bristol City	0–2	2–1	1–2	1–1	1–1	—	3–2	1–2	1–0	1–1	2–3	5–0	1–1	2–1	3–2	1–2	1–1	0–0	1–2	2–1	1–1	1–0	0–1	2–2
Cardiff City	0–1	1–1	1–1	0–1	1–1	1–2	—	2–0	1–0	0–1	2–1	0–1	0–1	0–2	3–1	2–1	4–0	0–0	0–1	0–1	2–3	2–1	0–4	0–4
Coventry City	0–3	1–0	0–0	2–2	1–1	3–2	1–0	—	1–1	4–1	1–2	0–2	0–1	2–0	0–1	2–1	3–0	1–1	1–2	2–1	4–1	1–0	1–2	1–2
Derby County	3–2	2–0	2–2	1–2	1–0	1–3	0–1	1–1	—	2–1	1–1	3–1	2–2	0–0	1–2	1–1	1–0	1–0	1–2	1–0	2–0	2–1	0–0	1–0
Fulham	1–1	4–1	6–2	2–0	1–1	6–2	2–0	1–3	0–0	—	1–2	2–0	7–0	1–1	3–0	0–1	2–1	3–0	4–1	1–2	0–1	3–0	3–1	3–0
Huddersfield Town	0–3	2–1	0–0	3–2	3–2	2–0	2–1	1–1	2–0	1–5	—	2–0	2–0	1–2	1–0	0–2	3–0	1–0	2–2	4–0	0–0	1–1	1–1	1–0
Hull City	0–0	0–2	2–0	2–0	1–1	2–2	2–1	0–1	0–1	0–1	0–1	—	1–3	2–0	2–1	1–1	1–2	0–1	0–3	3–0	1–3	0–2	2–0	0–2
Luton Town	3–2	2–1	0–5	0–0	1–1	2–1	1–2	5–0	1–0	1–1	0–0	1–0	—	3–1	2–2	1–0	3–0	4–0	1–2	1–0	0–0	0–1	3–3	2–0
Middlesbrough	1–0	2–0	0–2	1–1	1–2	2–1	2–0	1–0	4–1	0–1	0–2	0–1	2–1	—	1–1	2–0	2–0	1–2	2–3	2–1	2–0	3–1	1–0	2–1
Millwall	1–1	4–1	3–1	1–1	2–1	1–0	2–1	1–1	1–1	1–2	2–0	2–1	0–2	0–0	—	0–1	3–0	0–0	2–0	1–0	1–0	2–1	0–1	2–0
Nottingham Forest	1–2	3–0	2–0	1–2	2–1	2–0	1–2	2–0	2–1	0–4	0–1	2–1	0–0	0–2	1–1	—	2–0	3–0	3–1	4–0	1–1	2–2	5–1	4–0
Peterborough United	0–0	0–0	3–0	2–1	5–0	2–3	2–2	1–4	2–1	0–1	1–1	0–3	1–1	0–4	2–1	0–1	—	0–1	2–1	0–0	0–2	2–2	2–3	0–1
Preston North End	2–1	2–1	1–1	1–4	1–0	2–2	1–2	2–1	0–0	1–1	0–0	1–4	2–0	4–1	1–1	0–0	1–0	—	2–1	2–3	2–2	1–1	3–1	1–1
Queens Park Rangers	0–1	2–2	2–0	1–0	2–1	1–2	1–2	2–0	1–0	0–2	1–0	1–1	2–0	2–2	1–1	1–1	1–3	3–2	—	4–0	1–3	0–2	0–0	1–0
Reading	0–2	1–0	2–1	1–0	2–3	2–3	1–2	2–3	2–2	0–7	3–4	1–1	0–2	1–0	0–1	1–1	3–1	2–1	3–3	—	0–1	2–1	4–4	0–1
Sheffield United	0–0	2–0	0–1	1–0	0–1	2–0	1–0	0–0	1–0	4–0	1–2	0–0	2–0	4–1	1–2	1–1	6–2	2–2	1–0	1–2	—	2–1	4–0	2–0
Stoke City	0–1	1–1	2–2	0–1	0–1	0–1	3–3	1–1	1–2	2–3	2–1	2–0	1–2	0–0	2–0	1–0	2–0	1–2	1–0	3–2	1–0	—	3–0	1–0
Swansea City	3–3	1–1	0–0	1–0	1–1	3–1	3–0	3–1	2–1	1–5	1–0	0–0	0–1	1–1	0–0	1–4	3–0	1–0	0–1	2–3	0–0	1–3	—	2–1
West Bromwich Albion	2–0	4–0	1–0	0–0	2–1	3–0	1–1	0–0	0–0	1–0	2–2	1–0	3–2	1–1	1–1	0–0	3–0	0–2	2–1	1–0	4–0	1–3	0–2	—

Source: "Championship Results". Sky Sports.
Legend: Blue = home team win; Yellow = draw; Red = away team win.
For upcoming matches, an "a" indicates there is an article about the rivalry between the two participants.

== Season statistics ==
=== Scoring ===
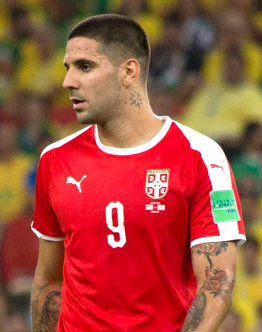
Aleksandar Mitrović won The Golden Boot this season, breaking the record for the most goals scored in a Championship season, with 43 goals. Mitrović also scored the most hat–tricks in the league, with three to his name, helping his club Fulham to the league title and an immediate Premier League return. Mitrović was rewarded by being named The Championship Player of the Season.

==== Top scorers ====
Rank	Player	Club	Goals
1	(Serbia) Aleksandar Mitrović	Fulham	43
2	(England) Dominic Solanke	Bournemouth	29
3	(Chile) Ben Brereton Díaz	Blackburn Rovers	22
3	(Suriname) Joël Piroe	Swansea City	22
3	(Austria) Andreas Weimann	Bristol City	22
6	(England) Karlan Grant	West Bromwich Albion	18
6	(Wales) Brennan Johnson^{1}	Nottingham Forest	18
8	(Sweden) Viktor Gyökeres	Coventry City	17
9	(England) Elijah Adebayo	Luton Town	16
9	(Denmark) Emil Riis Jakobsen	Preston North End	16

- ^{1} Includes 2 goals in The Championship play-offs.

==== Hat-tricks ====
Player	For	Against	Result	Date
(England) John Swift	Reading	Queens Park Rangers	3–3 (H)	11 September 2021
(Chile) Ben Brereton Díaz	Blackburn Rovers	Cardiff City	5–1 (H)	25 September 2021
(Serbia) Aleksandar Mitrović	Fulham	Swansea City	3–1 (H)	29 September 2021
(Serbia) Aleksandar Mitrović	Fulham	West Bromwich Albion	3–0 (H)	30 October 2021
(Austria) Andreas Weimann	Bristol City	Millwall	3–2 (H)	2 January 2022
(Serbia) Aleksandar Mitrović	Fulham	Bristol City	6–2 (H)	15 January 2022
(England) Danny Ward	Huddersfield Town	Reading	4–3 (A)	22 January 2022
(England) Sam Surridge	Nottingham Forest	Swansea City	5–1 (H)	30 April 2022

=== Clean sheets ===
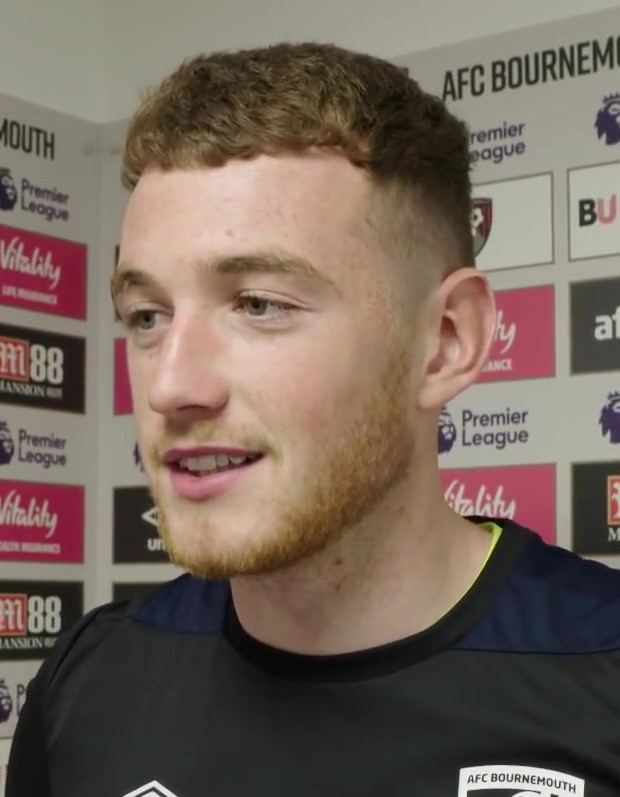
Mark Travers won The Golden Glove in The Championship this season, keeping 20 clean sheets, which helped Bournemouth to automatic promotion.

Rank	Player	Club	Clean sheets
1	(Republic of Ireland) Mark Travers	Bournemouth	20
2	(England) Lee Nicholls^{1}	Huddersfield Town	19
3	(England) Wes Foderingham	Sheffield United	18
4	(England) Sam Johnstone	West Bromwich Albion	15
4	(France) Brice Samba^{1}	Nottingham Forest	15
6	(Poland) Bartosz Białkowski	Millwall	14
6	(Slovakia) Marek Rodák	Fulham	14
8	(Denmark) Daniel Iversen	Preston North End	13
8	(Belgium) Thomas Kaminski	Blackburn Rovers	13
8	(England) Joe Lumley	Middlesbrough	13

- ^{1} Includes 1 clean sheet in The Championship play-offs.

=== Discipline ===
==== Player ====
- Most yellow cards: 16
  - (England) Matt Crooks (Middlesbrough)
- Most red cards: 2
  - (England) Fankaty Dabo (Coventry City)
  - (England) Darnell Furlong (West Bromwich Albion)
  - (England) Gary Gardner (Birmingham City)
  - (Wales) Tom Lawrence (Derby County)
  - (Colombia) Jefferson Lerma (Bournemouth)
  - (England) Jake Livermore (West Bromwich Albion)
  - (Republic of Ireland) Ryan Manning (Swansea City)

==== Club ====
- Most yellow cards: 107
  - Blackburn Rovers
- Most red cards: 7
  - Derby County
  - West Bromwich Albion

== Awards ==
=== Monthly ===
Month	Manager of the Month		Player of the Month		Reference
August	(Portugal) Marco Silva	Fulham	(Wales) Sorba Thomas	Huddersfield Town	
September	(England) Scott Parker	Bournemouth	(Chile) Ben Brereton Díaz	Blackburn Rovers	
October	(England) Scott Parker	Bournemouth	(Serbia) Aleksandar Mitrović	Fulham	
November	(England) Mark Warburton	Queens Park Rangers	(England) Chris Willock	Queens Park Rangers	
December	(England) Chris Wilder	Middlesbrough	(Guyana) Isaiah Jones	Middlesbrough	
January	(Portugal) Marco Silva	Fulham	(Ghana) Antoine Semenyo	Bristol City	
February	(Spain) Carlos Corberán	Huddersfield Town	(Angola) Lucas João	Reading	
March	(Wales) Steve Morison	Cardiff City	(England) Djed Spence	Nottingham Forest	
April	(Wales) Steve Cooper	Nottingham Forest	(Wales) Brennan Johnson	Nottingham Forest	

=== Annual ===
Award	Winner	Club
Player of the Season	(Serbia) Aleksandar Mitrović	Fulham
Young Player of the Season	(Wales) Brennan Johnson	Nottingham Forest
Apprentice of the Season	(Wales) Ryan Howley	Coventry City

Championship Team of the Season

Pos.	Player	Club	Ref.
GK	(England) Lee Nicholls	Huddersfield Town	
CB	(England) Tosin Adarabioyo	Fulham	
CB	(England) Lloyd Kelly	Bournemouth	
CB	(England) Joe Worrall	Nottingham Forest	
RWB	(England) Djed Spence	Nottingham Forest	
CM	(England) Ryan Yates	Nottingham Forest	
CM	(Denmark) Philip Billing	Bournemouth	
LWB	(United States) Antonee Robinson	Fulham	
FW	(Wales) Harry Wilson	Fulham	
FW	(England) Dominic Solanke	Bournemouth	
FW	(Serbia) Aleksandar Mitrović	Fulham	
Manager	(Wales) Nathan Jones	Luton Town	

=== PFA Championship Team of the Year ===
Pos.	Player	Club
GK	(England) Lee Nicholls	Huddersfield Town
DF	(United States) Tim Ream	Fulham
DF	(England) Tosin Adarabioyo	Fulham
DF	(England) Lloyd Kelly	Bournemouth
DF	(England) Djed Spence	Nottingham Forest
MF	(Denmark) Philip Billing	Bournemouth
MF	(Portugal) Fábio Carvalho	Fulham
MF	(Wales) Harry Wilson	Fulham
FW	(Chile) Ben Brereton Díaz	Blackburn Rovers
FW	(England) Dominic Solanke	Bournemouth
FW	(Serbia) Aleksandar Mitrović	Fulham
