= 2018–19 EFL Championship =

EFL Championship
- Season: 2018–19
- Dates: 3 August 2018 – 5 May 2019
- Champions: Norwich City; 1st Championship title 4th 2nd tier title
- Promoted: Norwich City; Sheffield United; Aston Villa
- Relegated: Rotherham United; Bolton Wanderers; Ipswich Town
- Matches: 552
- Goals: 1,473 (2.67 per match)
- Top goalscorer: Teemu Pukki (Norwich City) (29 goals)
- Biggest home win: West Bromwich Albion 7–1 Queens Park Rangers (18 August 2018)
- Biggest away win: Sheffield Wednesday 0–4 Norwich City (3 October 2018); Rotherham United 0–4 West Bromwich Albion (22 December 2018); Bolton Wanderers 0–4 Norwich City (16 February 2019)
- Highest scoring: Aston Villa 5–5 Nottingham Forest (28 November 2018)
- Longest winning run: 10 matches Aston Villa
- Longest unbeaten run: 14 matches Norwich City
- Longest winless run: 14 matches Bolton Wanderers
- Longest losing run: 7 matches Queens Park Rangers
- Highest attendance: 41,696; Aston Villa 1–2 Norwich City (5 May 2019)
- Lowest attendance: 8,018; Rotherham United 2–2 Queens Park Rangers (27 November 2018)
- Total attendance: 10,840,765
- Average attendance: 20,075

The 2018–19 EFL Championship (referred to as the Sky Bet Championship for sponsorship reasons) was the third season of the EFL Championship under its current name, and the twenty-seventh season under its current league structure. Norwich City were crowned champions on the final day, following a 2–1 win over Aston Villa.

== Team changes ==
The following teams had changed division after the 2017–18 season.

=== To Championship ===
Promoted from League One

- Wigan Athletic
- Blackburn Rovers
- Rotherham United

Relegated from Premier League

- Swansea City
- Stoke City
- West Bromwich Albion

=== From Championship ===
Promoted to Premier League

- Wolverhampton Wanderers
- Cardiff City
- Fulham

Relegated to League One

- Barnsley
- Burton Albion
- Sunderland

== Stadiums ==
Locations of the 2018–19 Football League Championship teams
NorthWest Championship football clubs
West Midlands Championship football clubs
London Championship football clubs

Team	Location	Stadium	Capacity
Aston Villa	Birmingham (Aston)	Villa Park	42,790
Birmingham City	Birmingham (Bordesley)	St Andrew's	30,015
Blackburn Rovers	Blackburn	Ewood Park	31,367
Bolton Wanderers	Bolton	University of Bolton Stadium	28,723
Brentford	London (Brentford)	Griffin Park	12,300
Bristol City	Bristol	Ashton Gate	27,000
Derby County	Derby	Pride Park Stadium	33,600
Hull City	Kingston upon Hull	KCOM Stadium	25,586
Ipswich Town	Ipswich	Portman Road	30,300
Leeds United	Leeds	Elland Road	37,890
Middlesbrough	Middlesbrough	Riverside Stadium	34,000
Millwall	London (South Bermondsey)	The Den	20,146
Norwich City	Norwich	Carrow Road	27,244
Nottingham Forest	West Bridgford	City Ground	30,445
Preston North End	Preston	Deepdale	23,408
Queens Park Rangers	London (White City)	Loftus Road	18,439
Reading	Reading	Madejski Stadium	24,161
Rotherham United	Rotherham	New York Stadium	12,021
Sheffield United	Sheffield (Highfield)	Bramall Lane	32,702
Sheffield Wednesday	Sheffield (Owlerton)	Hillsborough Stadium	39,752
Stoke City	Stoke-on-Trent	Bet365 Stadium	30,089
Swansea City	Swansea	Liberty Stadium	21,088
West Bromwich Albion	West Bromwich	The Hawthorns	26,850
Wigan Athletic	Wigan	DW Stadium	25,133

== Personnel and sponsoring ==
Team	Manager	Captain	Kit manufacturer	Sponsor
Aston Villa	(England) Dean Smith	(Wales) James Chester	Luke Sport	32Red
Birmingham City	(England) Garry Monk	(England) Michael Morrison	Adidas	888sport
Blackburn Rovers	(England) Tony Mowbray	(Scotland) Charlie Mulgrew	Umbro	10bet
Bolton Wanderers	(England) Phil Parkinson	(England) David Wheater	Macron	Betfred
Brentford	(Denmark) Thomas Frank	(Saint Kitts and Nevis) Romaine Sawyers	Adidas	LeoVegas
Bristol City	(England) Lee Johnson	(Australia) Bailey Wright	Avon	Dunder
Derby County	(England) Frank Lampard	(England) Curtis Davies	Umbro	32Red
Hull City	(England) Nigel Adkins	(Norway) Markus Henriksen	Umbro	SportPesa
Ipswich Town	(Scotland) Paul Lambert	(England) Luke Chambers	Adidas	Magical Vegas
Leeds United	(Argentina) Marcelo Bielsa	(Scotland) Liam Cooper	Kappa	32Red
Middlesbrough	(Wales) Tony Pulis	(England) George Friend	Hummel	32Red
Millwall	(England) Neil Harris	(Wales) Steve Morison	Macron	TW Drainage
Norwich City	(Germany) Daniel Farke	(Scotland) Grant Hanley	Erreà	LeoVegas
Nottingham Forest	(Northern Ireland) Martin O'Neill	(England) Ben Watson	Macron	BetBright
Preston North End	(Scotland) Alex Neil	(England) Tom Clarke	Nike	32Red
Queens Park Rangers	(England) John Eustace (caretaker)	(Germany) Toni Leistner	Erreà	Royal Panda
Reading	(Portugal) José Gomes	(Republic of Ireland) Paul McShane	Puma	Carabao
Rotherham United	(England) Paul Warne	(England) Richard Wood	Puma	Hodge Clemco
Sheffield United	(England) Chris Wilder	(England) Billy Sharp	Adidas	Ramsdens Currency
Sheffield Wednesday	(England) Steve Bruce	(England) Tom Lees	Elev8	Chansiri
Stoke City	(Wales) Nathan Jones	(England) Ryan Shawcross	Macron	bet365
Swansea City	(England) Graham Potter	(Netherlands) Leroy Fer	Joma	Bet UK
West Bromwich Albion	(England) James Shan (caretaker)	(Northern Ireland) Chris Brunt	Puma	Ideal Boilers
Wigan Athletic	(England) Paul Cook	(Egypt) Sam Morsy	Puma	DW Sports Fitness

== Managerial changes ==
Team	Outgoing manager	Manner of departure	Date of vacancy	Position in table	Incoming manager	Date of appointment
Ipswich Town	(England) Bryan Klug	End of caretaker spell	6 May 2018	Pre-season	(England) Paul Hurst	30 May 2018
Queens Park Rangers	(England) Ian Holloway	Mutual consent	10 May 2018	Pre-season	(England) Steve McClaren	18 May 2018
Swansea City	(Portugal) Carlos Carvalhal	End of contract	18 May 2018	Pre-season	(England) Graham Potter	11 June 2018
Stoke City	(Scotland) Paul Lambert	Resigned	18 May 2018	Pre-season	(England) Gary Rowett	22 May 2018
Derby County	(England) Gary Rowett	Signed by Stoke City	22 May 2018	Pre-season	(England) Frank Lampard	31 May 2018
Leeds United	(England) Paul Heckingbottom	Sacked	1 June 2018	Pre-season	(Argentina) Marcelo Bielsa	15 June 2018
Aston Villa	(England) Steve Bruce	Sacked	3 October 2018	12th	(England) Dean Smith	10 October 2018
Brentford	(England) Dean Smith	Signed by Aston Villa	10 October 2018	7th	(Denmark) Thomas Frank	16 October 2018
Ipswich Town	(England) Paul Hurst	Sacked	25 October 2018	24th	(Scotland) Paul Lambert	27 October 2018
Reading	(England) Paul Clement	Sacked	6 December 2018	21st	(Portugal) José Gomes	22 December 2018
Sheffield Wednesday	(Netherlands) Jos Luhukay	Sacked	21 December 2018	18th	(England) Steve Bruce	2 January 2019
Stoke City	(England) Gary Rowett	Sacked	8 January 2019	14th	(Wales) Nathan Jones	9 January 2019
Nottingham Forest	(Spain) Aitor Karanka	Mutual consent	11 January 2019	7th	(Northern Ireland) Martin O'Neill	14 January 2019
West Bromwich Albion	(Jamaica) Darren Moore	Sacked	9 March 2019	4th	(Croatia) Slaven Bilić	13 June 2019
Queens Park Rangers	(England) Steve McClaren	Sacked	1 April 2019	17th	(England) Mark Warburton	8 May 2019

== League table ==
Pos	Team	Pld	W	D	L	GF	GA	GD	Pts	Promotion, qualification or relegation
1	Norwich City (C, P)	46	27	13	6	93	57	+36	94	Promotion to the Premier League
2	Sheffield United (P)	46	26	11	9	78	41	+37	89	Promotion to the Premier League
3	Leeds United	46	25	8	13	73	50	+23	83	Qualification for Championship play-offs (Note: Four teams play for one spot and promotion to the Premier League.)
4	West Bromwich Albion	46	23	11	12	87	62	+25	80	Qualification for Championship play-offs
5	Aston Villa (O, P)	46	20	16	10	82	61	+21	76	Qualification for Championship play-offs
6	Derby County	46	20	14	12	69	54	+15	74	Qualification for Championship play-offs
7	Middlesbrough	46	20	13	13	49	41	+8	73	
8	Bristol City	46	19	13	14	59	53	+6	70	
9	Nottingham Forest	46	17	15	14	61	54	+7	66	
10	Swansea City	46	18	11	17	65	62	+3	65	
11	Brentford	46	17	13	16	73	59	+14	64 (Note: Brentford were awarded a 1–0 win over Bolton due to Bolton's inability to hold the fixture.)	
12	Sheffield Wednesday	46	16	16	14	60	62	−2	64	
13	Hull City	46	17	11	18	66	68	−2	62	
14	Preston North End	46	16	13	17	67	67	0	61	
15	Blackburn Rovers	46	16	12	18	64	69	−5	60	
16	Stoke City	46	11	22	13	45	52	−7	55	
17	Birmingham City	46	14	19	13	64	58	+6	52 (Note: Birmingham City were deducted 9 points for failure to comply with the EFL profitability and sustainability rules.)	
18	Wigan Athletic	46	13	13	20	51	64	−13	52	
19	Queens Park Rangers	46	14	9	23	53	71	−18	51	
20	Reading	46	10	17	19	49	66	−17	47	
21	Millwall	46	10	14	22	48	64	−16	44	
22	Rotherham United (R)	46	8	16	22	52	83	−31	40	Relegation to EFL League One
23	Bolton Wanderers (R)	46	8	8	30	29	78	−49	32	Relegation to EFL League One
24	Ipswich Town (R)	46	5	16	25	36	77	−41	31	Relegation to EFL League One

Source: Sky Sports Archived 25 September 2019 at the Wayback Machine
Rules for classification: 1) Points; 2) Goal difference; 3) Number of goals scored; 4) Head-to-head results
(C) Champions; (O) Play-off winners; (P) Promoted; (R) Relegated

== Play-offs ==
Semi-finals
3	Leeds United	1	2	3
6	Derby County	0	4	4
4	West Bromwich Albion	1	1	2 (3)
5	Aston Villa	2	0	2 (4)

Final
6	Derby County	1
5	Aston Villa	2

== Results ==
Home \ Away	AST	BIR	BLB	BOL	BRE	BRI	DER	HUL	IPS	LEE	MID	MIL	NOR	NOT	PNE	QPR	REA	ROT	SHU	SHW	STO	SWA	WBA	WIG
Aston Villa	—	4–2	2–1	2–0	2–2	2–1	4–0	2–2	2–1	2–3	3–0	1–0	1–2	5–5	3–3	2–2	1–1	2–0	3–3	1–2	2–2	1–0	0–2	3–2
Birmingham City	0–1	—	2–2	0–1	0–0	0–1	2–2	3–3	2–2	1–0	1–2	0–2	2–2	2–0	3–0	0–0	2–1	3–1	1–1	3–1	2–0	0–0	1–1	1–1
Blackburn Rovers	1–1	2–2	—	2–0	1–0	0–1	2–0	3–0	2–0	2–1	0–1	0–0	0–1	2–2	0–1	1–0	2–2	1–1	0–2	4–2	0–1	2–2	2–1	3–0
Bolton Wanderers	0–2	1–0	0–1	—	0–1	2–2	1–0	0–1	1–2	0–1	0–2	2–1	0–4	0–3	1–2	1–2	1–1	2–1	0–3	0–2	0–0	0–1	0–2	1–1
Brentford	1–0	1–1	5–2	1–0	—	0–1	3–3	5–1	2–0	2–0	1–2	2–0	1–1	2–1	3–0	3–0	2–2	5–1	2–3	2–0	3–1	2–3	0–1	2–0
Bristol City	1–1	1–2	4–1	2–1	1–1	—	0–2	1–0	1–1	0–1	0–2	1–1	2–2	1–1	0–1	2–1	1–1	1–0	1–0	1–2	0–1	2–0	3–2	2–2
Derby County	0–3	3–1	0–0	4–0	3–1	1–1	—	2–0	2–0	1–4	1–1	0–1	1–1	0–0	2–0	2–0	2–1	6–1	2–1	1–1	0–0	2–1	3–1	2–1
Hull City	1–3	2–0	0–1	6–0	2–0	1–1	1–2	—	2–0	0–1	1–1	2–1	0–0	0–2	1–1	2–2	3–1	2–2	0–3	3–0	2–0	3–2	1–0	2–1
Ipswich Town	1–1	1–1	2–2	0–0	1–1	2–3	1–1	0–2	—	3–2	0–2	2–3	1–1	1–1	1–1	0–2	1–2	1–0	1–1	0–1	1–1	0–1	1–2	1–0
Leeds United	1–1	1–2	3–2	2–1	1–1	2–0	2–0	0–2	2–0	—	0–0	3–2	1–3	1–1	3–0	2–1	1–0	2–0	0–1	1–0	3–1	2–1	4–0	1–2
Middlesbrough	0–3	1–0	1–1	2–0	1–2	0–1	1–1	1–0	2–0	1–1	—	1–1	0–1	0–2	1–2	2–0	2–1	0–0	3–0	0–1	1–0	0–0	1–0	2–0
Millwall	2–1	0–2	0–2	1–1	1–1	1–2	2–1	2–2	3–0	1–1	2–2	—	1–3	1–0	1–3	0–0	1–0	0–0	2–3	0–0	0–0	1–2	2–0	2–1
Norwich City	2–1	3–1	2–1	3–2	1–0	3–2	3–4	3–2	3–0	0–3	1–0	4–3	—	3–3	2–0	4–0	2–2	3–1	2–2	2–2	0–1	1–0	3–4	1–0
Nottingham Forest	1–3	2–2	1–2	1–0	2–1	0–1	1–0	3–0	2–0	4–2	3–0	2–2	1–2	—	0–1	0–1	1–0	1–0	1–0	2–1	0–0	2–1	1–1	3–1
Preston North End	1–1	1–0	4–1	2–2	4–3	1–1	0–0	1–2	4–0	0–2	1–1	3–2	3–1	0–0	—	1–0	2–3	1–1	0–1	3–3	2–2	1–1	2–3	4–0
Queens Park Rangers	1–0	3–4	1–2	1–2	3–2	0–3	1–1	2–3	3–0	1–0	2–1	2–0	0–1	0–1	1–4	—	0–0	1–2	1–2	3–0	0–0	4–0	2–3	1–0
Reading	0–0	0–0	2–1	0–1	2–1	3–2	1–2	3–0	2–2	0–3	0–1	3–1	1–2	2–0	2–1	0–1	—	1–1	0–2	1–2	2–2	1–4	0–0	3–2
Rotherham United	1–2	1–3	3–2	1–1	2–4	0–0	1–0	2–3	1–0	1–2	1–2	1–0	1–2	2–1	2–1	2–2	1–1	—	2–2	2–2	2–2	2–1	0–4	1–1
Sheffield United	4–1	0–0	3–0	2–0	2–0	2–3	3–1	1–0	2–0	0–1	1–0	1–1	2–1	2–0	3–2	1–0	4–0	2–0	—	0–0	1–1	1–2	1–2	4–2
Sheffield Wednesday	1–3	1–1	4–2	1–0	2–0	2–0	1–2	1–1	2–1	1–1	1–2	2–1	0–4	3–0	1–0	1–2	0–0	2–2	0–0	—	2–2	3–1	2–2	1–0
Stoke City	1–1	0–1	2–3	2–0	1–1	0–2	2–1	2–0	2–0	2–1	0–0	1–0	2–2	2–0	0–2	2–2	0–0	2–2	2–2	0–0	—	1–0	0–1	0–3
Swansea City	0–1	3–3	3–1	2–0	3–0	0–1	1–1	2–2	2–3	2–2	3–1	1–0	1–4	0–0	1–0	3–0	2–0	4–3	1–0	2–1	3–1	—	1–2	2–2
West Bromwich Albion	2–2	3–2	1–1	1–2	1–1	4–2	1–4	3–2	1–1	4–1	2–3	2–0	1–1	2–2	4–1	7–1	4–1	2–1	0–1	1–1	2–1	3–0	—	2–0
Wigan Athletic	3–0	0–3	3–1	5–2	0–0	1–0	0–1	2–1	1–1	1–2	0–0	1–0	1–1	2–2	2–0	2–1	0–0	1–0	0–3	3–2	0–0	0–0	1–0	—

Source: EFL Official Website
Legend: Blue = home team win; Yellow = draw; Red = away team win.
For upcoming matches, an "a" indicates there is an article about the rivalry between the two participants.

== Top scorers ==
Rank	Player	Club	Goals
1	(Finland) Teemu Pukki	Norwich City	29
2	(England) Tammy Abraham	Aston Villa	25
2	(France) Neal Maupay	Brentford	25
4	(England) Dwight Gayle	West Bromwich Albion	23
4	(England) Billy Sharp	Sheffield United	23
6	(Scotland) Che Adams	Birmingham City	22
6	(England) Jarrod Bowen	Hull City	22
6	(Scotland) Oli McBurnie	Swansea City	22
6	(England) Jay Rodriguez	West Bromwich Albion	22
10	(England) Lewis Grabban	Nottingham Forest	16

== Hat-tricks ==
Player	For	Against	Result	Date	Ref
(England) Lukas Jutkiewicz	Birmingham City	Rotherham United	3–1 (H)	6 October 2018	
(England) Billy Sharp	Sheffield United	Wigan Athletic	4–2 (H)	27 October 2018	
(Scotland) Che Adams	Birmingham City	Hull City	3–3 (H)	10 November 2018	
(England) Tammy Abraham	Aston Villa	Nottingham Forest	5–5 (H) (Note: Player scored 4 goals)	28 November 2018	
(England) Danny Graham	Blackburn Rovers	Sheffield Wednesday	4–2 (H)	1 December 2018	
(England) Dwight Gayle	West Bromwich Albion	Rotherham United	0–4 (A)	22 December 2018	
(England) Billy Sharp	Sheffield United	Aston Villa	3–3 (A)	8 February 2019	
(Scotland) Che Adams	Birmingham City	Queens Park Rangers	3–4 (A)	9 February 2019	
(Algeria) Saïd Benrahma	Brentford	Hull City	5–1 (H)	23 February 2019	
(England) Martyn Waghorn	Derby County	Rotherham United	6–1 (H)	30 March 2019	
(Austria) Andreas Weimann	Bristol City	Sheffield United	2–3 (A)	30 March 2019	
(England) Mason Mount	Derby County	Bolton Wanderers	4–0 (H)	13 April 2019	
(England) Dwight Gayle	West Bromwich Albion	Preston North End	4–1 (H)	13 April 2019	

== Monthly awards ==
Month	Manager of the Month		Player of the Month		Reference
Month	Manager	Club	Player	Club	Reference
August	(Argentina) Marcelo Bielsa	Leeds United	(Jamaica) Kemar Roofe	Leeds United	
September	(Jamaica) Darren Moore	West Bromwich Albion	(England) Dwight Gayle	West Bromwich Albion	
October	(England) Steve McClaren	Queens Park Rangers	(England) Lukas Jutkiewicz	Birmingham City	
November	(Germany) Daniel Farke	Norwich City	(England) Tammy Abraham	Aston Villa	
December	(England) Nigel Adkins	Hull City	(England) Jarrod Bowen	Hull City	
January	(England) Tony Mowbray	Blackburn Rovers	(England) Adam Armstrong	Blackburn Rovers	
February	(England) Chris Wilder	Sheffield United	(Scotland) Ché Adams	Birmingham City	
March	(England) Dean Smith	Aston Villa	(Nigeria) Semi Ajayi	Rotherham United	
April	(England) Chris Wilder	Sheffield United	(England) Dwight Gayle	West Bromwich Albion	

== Attendances ==
No.	Club	Average	Change	Highest	Lowest
1	Aston Villa	36,027	12.2%	41,696	27,331
2	Leeds United	34,033	8.0%	37,004	27,729
3	Nottingham Forest	28,144	14.0%	29,530	25,753
4	Derby County	26,850	-1.2%	32,055	23,580
5	Sheffield United	26,177	-2.5%	30,261	23,400
6	Norwich City	26,014	0.2%	27,040	24,642
7	Stoke City	25,200	-13.9%	28,586	22,078
8	Sheffield Wednesday	24,429	-6.0%	31,630	20,861
9	West Bromwich Albion	24,148	-1.5%	26,548	20,282
10	Middlesbrough	23,217	-9.1%	30,881	21,016
11	Birmingham City	22,483	6.8%	26,631	19,795
12	Bristol City	21,080	0.6%	25,556	18,411
13	Swansea City	18,737	-9.1%	20,860	17,197
14	Ipswich Town	17,765	9.2%	25,690	13,612
15	Reading	14,991	-10.0%	17,458	11,271
16	Bolton Wanderers	14,636	-7.9%	17,811	12,195
17	Blackburn Rovers	14,550	13.4%	21,577	11,818
18	Preston North End	14,160	2.8%	19,912	10,849
19	Queens Park Rangers	13,866	-0.4%	17,609	10,854
20	Millwall	13,636	2.0%	17,195	11,190
21	Hull City	12,165	-22.1%	14,116	10,191
22	Wigan Athletic	11,663	27.4%	15,655	8,848
23	Brentford	10,257	0.2%	12,225	8,903
24	Rotherham United	9,880	16.0%	11,736	8,018
