= Southampton F.C. espionage incident =

2026 association football spying controversy

Image taken by Middlesbrough, showing the Southampton spy recording sessions at their training ground

On 19 May 2026, association football club Southampton were expelled from their scheduled EFL Championship play-off final with Hull City after admitting to spying on three teams' training sessions during the 2025–26 EFL Championship, the second tier of the English football league system. Southampton head coach Tonda Eckert had authorised staff members to infiltrate rival training grounds and film their sessions to inform his tactics, against English Football League (EFL) regulations. The controversy has become known as "Spygate" in English media.

The incidents came to public attention following accusations by Middlesbrough that Southampton had spied on their training sessions prior to their play-off semi-finals, which was won by Southampton. The EFL – which prohibits the viewing of rival training sessions within 72 hours of a match – subsequently investigated the incident, as well as two others involving Oxford United and Ipswich Town. Southampton admitted to all three cases and were barred from competing for promotion to the 2026–27 Premier League, with Middlesbrough taking Southampton's spot in the final against Hull City and the latter ultimately winning promotion. Following the conclusion of the investigation by the EFL, the Football Association (FA) opened its own investigation into Southampton's conduct, specifically against manager Tonda Eckert, and they proceeded to charge him with three counts of rule breaching due to the spying. Eckert subsequently received a six-week suspended ban from professional football.

The play-off expulsion, unsuccessfully appealed by Southampton, has been regarded as one of the largest sporting penalties in modern history, with upwards of £200 million in television revenue awarded to the winner of the final. Critical reactions to the punishment have been mixed, with some pundits supporting the decision and others feeling it was disproportionate. Legal options have been explored by Wrexham and Millwall, whose play-off positions were impacted by the presence of Southampton.

== Background ==
=== EFL play-offs ===
The EFL play-offs take place at the end of each regular English Football League (EFL) season, with the teams positioned third to sixth in each league contesting two semi-finals and a final; the winner of the final promoted to the next tier of the English football league system. The EFL Championship, the second tier of English football, is the top division of the EFL and the play-offs serve as a route of promotion to the Premier League. Due to the Premier League offering upwards of £200 million in broadcasting payments for its members, the Championship play-off final has become known as "the richest game in sports".

=== 2025–26 season ===
Southampton, who had been relegated from the Premier League in 2025, finished the regular 2025–26 season in fourth place in the Championship, two places and seven points ahead of Hull City. They both therefore missed out on the two automatic places for promotion to the Premier League and instead took part in the play-offs to determine the third and final promoted team. Southampton finished four points behind Ipswich Town—who were promoted in second place—and 15 points behind league winners Coventry City, whilst Hull City were 11 points behind Ipswich Town and 22 points behind Coventry City.

Southampton and Middlesbrough were matched together, and played their first semi-final at the Riverside Stadium on 9 May 2026. Middlesbrough dominated the first-half with the home side having 17 shots to Southampton's none but did not score. Southampton improved in the second-half and Taylor Harwood-Bellis headed an effort against the bar and the game finished 0–0. The second leg took place on 12 May at St Mary's Stadium in Southampton. Middlesbrough took the lead in the fifth minute when Riley McGree shot first time from a central position in the box into the bottom corner. Southampton equalised just before half-time with Ross Stewart heading the ball over the line from close range. No further goals were scored in the second-half and the game went to extra time. Southampton scored in the 116th minute when Shea Charles crossed the ball from the right wing which crept in at the far post. The game ended 2–1 to Southampton and also 2–1 on aggregate, provisionally sending Southampton through to the final.

=== 2019 Leeds United espionage controversy ===
In 2019, Leeds United manager Marcelo Bielsa admitted he had sent a spy to Derby County's training ground, after reports emerged in the press that a man was spotted outside the training ground. Leeds were fined £200,000 by the EFL for breach of a portion of Rule 3.4 of EFL Regulations. Following this, the EFL announced a new rule where teams could not watch opposition training up to 72 hours before a game.

== Incident ==
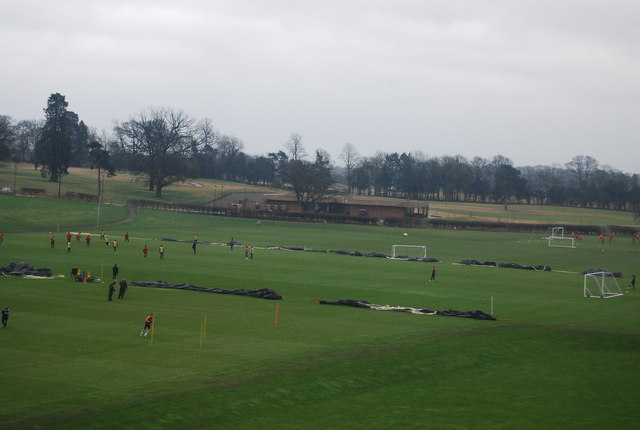
Rockliffe Park, the training ground of Middlesbrough F.C.

On 7 May, two days before the first leg of the play-off semi-final between Middlesbrough and Southampton, a man wearing earphones was seen using a smartphone to film Middlesbrough players and coaching staff training at Rockliffe Park. The man attempted to hide behind a tree outside the training ground, but was spotted by Middlesbrough club staff. When approached, the man refused to identify himself and fled through a nearby golf course, changing into different clothing in the golf club toilets before leaving the area. The incident was dubbed Spygate by the media. The Times reported that the alleged spy was William Salt, an analyst for Southampton.

== Response ==
=== Middlesbrough reaction ===
Middlesbrough subsequently released pictures their staff had taken of the man, matching his identity to William Salt, an analyst intern featured on the Southampton club website; they then reported the incident to the EFL. The following day, Southampton were charged with breaking EFL Regulations 3.4 and 127.1 (Note: EFL Regulation 3.4: "In all matters and transactions relating to The League each Club shall behave towards each other Club and The League with the utmost good faith. Further, each Club shall deliver to the League a copy of the Club Charter signed by the appropriate Director for and on behalf of the Club. The League shall be entitled to publish the Club Charter."; EFL Regulation 127.1: "Without prejudice to the requirements of Regulation 3.4 (that each Club shall behave towards each other Club with the utmost good faith), no Club shall directly or indirectly observe (or attempt to observe) another Club’s training session in the period of 72 hours prior to any match scheduled to be played between those respective Clubs.") in relation to the alleged espionage incident. After the 0–0 draw in the first leg of the play-off semi-final, Middlesbrough head coach Kim Hellberg publicly accused Southampton of cheating; when the Southampton head coach Tonda Eckert was asked "are you a cheat?" by a journalist in a post-match press conference, he did not answer and walked out.

Southampton fans were seen mocking Middlesbrough fans throughout the fixtures with binoculars, which were mimicked by Southampton defender Taylor Harwood-Bellis when celebrating their second-leg goal. In the local press, Dominic Shaw of The Northern Echo argued for Southampton's expulsion from the play-offs, making reference to Northern Premier League side Stockton Town from the seventh-tier of the football pyramid, who in the 2024–25 season were disqualified from the league's play-offs after fielding an ineligible player in the semi-final.

=== EFL investigation and sanctions ===
If found guilty, the potential punishments for Southampton included one of, or a combination of: a fine; a points deduction for the following season; or being expelled from the play-offs. Despite their semi-final defeat after the second leg, Middlesbrough players returned to training at Rockliffe Park on 14 May, delaying the start of their summer break in case they were to advance to the play-off final as a result of disciplinary proceedings against Southampton. Ticket sales for the Championship play-off final commenced on 15 May after a slight delay, despite ongoing uncertainty around Southampton's participation; the EFL were working on the basis that the final would go ahead as planned, while having contingency options in place for all potential scenarios.

A hearing with the EFL Independent Disciplinary Commission took place on 19 May. During that evening, it was announced that Southampton had admitted conducting espionage against Middlesbrough, and they were also charged with conducting espionage prior to regular season matches against Oxford United in December 2025 and against promotion rivals Ipswich Town in April 2026. As a result, Southampton were expelled from the play-offs and Middlesbrough advanced to the final in their place; Southampton were also deducted four points for the following season. The EFL announced that the final would go ahead as scheduled on 23 May at the slightly earlier kick-off time of 15:30 BST, pending the outcome of any appeal process.

==== Independent Disciplinary Commission's written reasons ====
On 21 May, The Independent Disciplinary Commission's written reasons were published. It revealed head coach Tonda Eckert had authorised a "contrived and determined plan" to spy on opponents in a "deplorable approach". An intern claimed he felt pressured to carry out operations. The intern was in the vicinity of Oxford United's training ground on 23 and 24 December 2025 ahead of their match with Southampton on 26 December 2025, and the intern observed training sessions and shared information and footage. The written reasons also revealed an individual, on instructions from coaching and analytical staff, observed and shared footage of Ipswich Town training at National League club Eastleigh's training ground ahead of a match with Southampton the same day. Eckert authorised a spy to visit Middlesbrough's training ground to seek the availability of a key player ahead of their play-off semi final first leg.

Eckert "accepted that he had specifically authorised the observation" which had "seriously violated" the integrity of the competition, whilst a reprimand was placed on Southampton in addition to the expulsion and points deduction due to how junior members of staff were put "under pressure to carry out activities they knew was morally wrong". Southampton initially argued that the conduct was not part of the culture at the club and no video had been captured, transmitted, shared or analysed but subsequently acknowledged that was inaccurate.

=== Southampton appeal ===
Southampton announced on 20 May that they were appealing against the sanctions, with the appeal to be heard later that day. Chief Executive Phil Parsons apologised to the other clubs involved and the Southampton supporters, but described the sanction as "manifestly disproportionate". Play-off final tickets for Middlesbrough fans went on sale online on 20 May; Southampton had already sold out their allocation of 37,604 tickets by the morning of 19 May, which were subsequently refunded. Southampton had hired lawyer Lord Pannick KC to help fight the appeal but it was rejected later that day. Neither the EFL or Southampton had any further opportunity of appeal.

==== League Arbitration Panel's written reasons and Southampton response ====
On 1 June, the League Arbitration Panel's written reasons were published. Within the written reasons, WhatsApp messages revealed how the spying was planned. It also revealed an analyst from Southampton asked if they could be provided with an Eastleigh kit to watch Ipswich training. Footage of the entire training session was sent back to Southampton but Eckert believed someone at Eastleigh had provided the footage.

Upon the release, Southampton issued a statement and said they "accept that the club breached the relevant regulations, and we recognise that the disciplinary bodies were entitled to conclude that proof of sporting advantage was not necessary in order to establish a serious offence". The statement also questioned the composition of the Independent Disciplinary panel.

=== FA investigation ===
On 21 May, the Football Association (FA) opened an investigation into Southampton's conduct to determine if charges should be brought following the decision by the EFL independent disciplinary commission. Unlike the EFL which can only take action against its member clubs, the FA has the ability to punish the individuals involved, and if found guilty, the potential punishment for the individuals include a ban from football. On 22 July 2026, the FA charged Eckert with three breaches of FA rule E3.1 in relation to misconduct between December 2025 and May 2026. Eckert received a six-week ban from all professional football, suspended until the end of 2027–28 season, and a £28,000 fine.

== Reactions ==
Southampton described the EFL sanctions as the largest in history, criticising the punishment as disproportionate. Hull City explored legal options as the club faced a new opponent in the play-off final, and owner Acun Ilicali revealed his lawyers believed the club should be promoted directly to the Premier League; he stated that Hull would take legal action if they lost to Middlesbrough. Wrexham – who finished seventh in the league, missing out on the play-offs – released a statement in which they said they were "monitoring the situation" and waiting for the release of the EFL's full written reasons for any decision, amid reports that they were considering launching legal action against Southampton. Wrexham forward Josh Windass called for the play-offs to be replayed without Southampton. Millwall also considered their legal options.

Various Southampton players reacted on social media, with defender Taylor Harwood-Bellis stating he would "never" have directed a binoculars celebration towards Middlesbrough midfielder Aidan Morris had he known the severity of the situation. Midfielder Léo Scienza apologised to the players and supporters of Hull City and Middlesbrough and stated Southampton supporters "deserved better".

There were mixed reactions to the severity of the punishment Southampton received, with some, such as Paul Robinson, Matt Upson, Troy Deeney, and Andy McDonald supporting the decision. Others, such as Gary Lineker, Alan Shearer, Harry Redknapp, and Alan Whitehead argued the punishment was extreme, harsh or disproportionate.

There were also accusations of bias against a member of the Independent Disciplinary Commission David Winnie – who made one appearance for Middlesbrough in 1994 – primarily on social media, but Winnie dismissed any claims of bias and stated "at no stage was any issue raised by either party regarding my independence or suitability to sit on the commission".

== Aftermath ==
Southampton could face a legal claim from their players who are considering to seek advice from the Professional Footballers' Association (PFA) about having the financial effect of promotion taken away. The club could also face legal action from sponsors for reputational damage.

Businesses in Southampton faced losing money after the club was expelled from the play-off final, including transport, pubs, cafés and hotels. A spokesperson for Southampton Away Travel, an independent business providing travel to away days for Southampton supporters, said "the uncertainty of the club's fate has extended beyond the club itself", whilst pubs near St Mary's Stadium were prepared for an increase in trade before the fixture was cancelled.

On 2 June, Southampton owner Dragan Šolak said he would not dismiss Eckert. The same day, Eckert publicly apologised to the players, staff and supporters.

When the dates for the 2026–27 EFL Championship season were announced, Wrexham mocked Southampton by releasing a graphic of a calendar with a date circled telling people to "check training ground" two days before their match scheduled for 19 September 2026. Birmingham City also made reference to Spygate by releasing a graphic concerning their fixture on 1 September 2026, of the two club's crests cut into a hedge and seen through a pair of binoculars.

== See also ==
- List of -gate scandals and controversies
- Canada Soccer drone spying scandal, a similar controversy involving the Canada women's national team
- 2007 Formula One espionage controversy, a similar controversy in Formula One; also known as "Spygate"
- Houston Astros sign stealing scandal, a similar controversy in baseball; also known as "Spygate"
- Spygate (NFL), a similar controversy in American football; also known as "Spygate"
