= EFL Championship Manager of the Month =

Award in English football

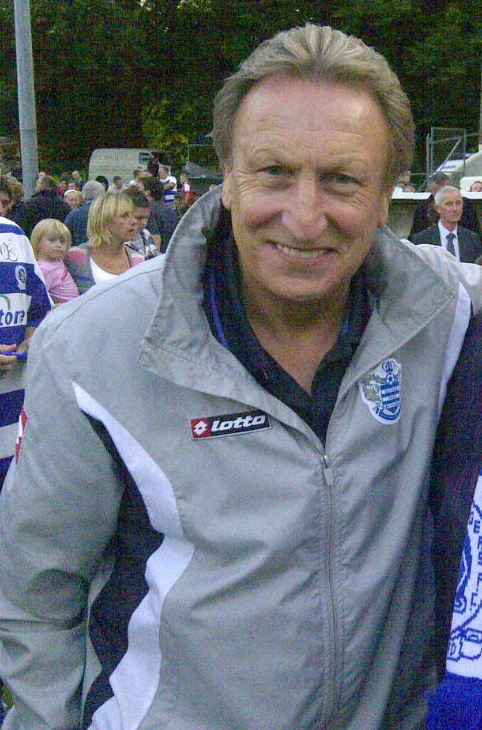
Neil Warnock has won the award 11 times.

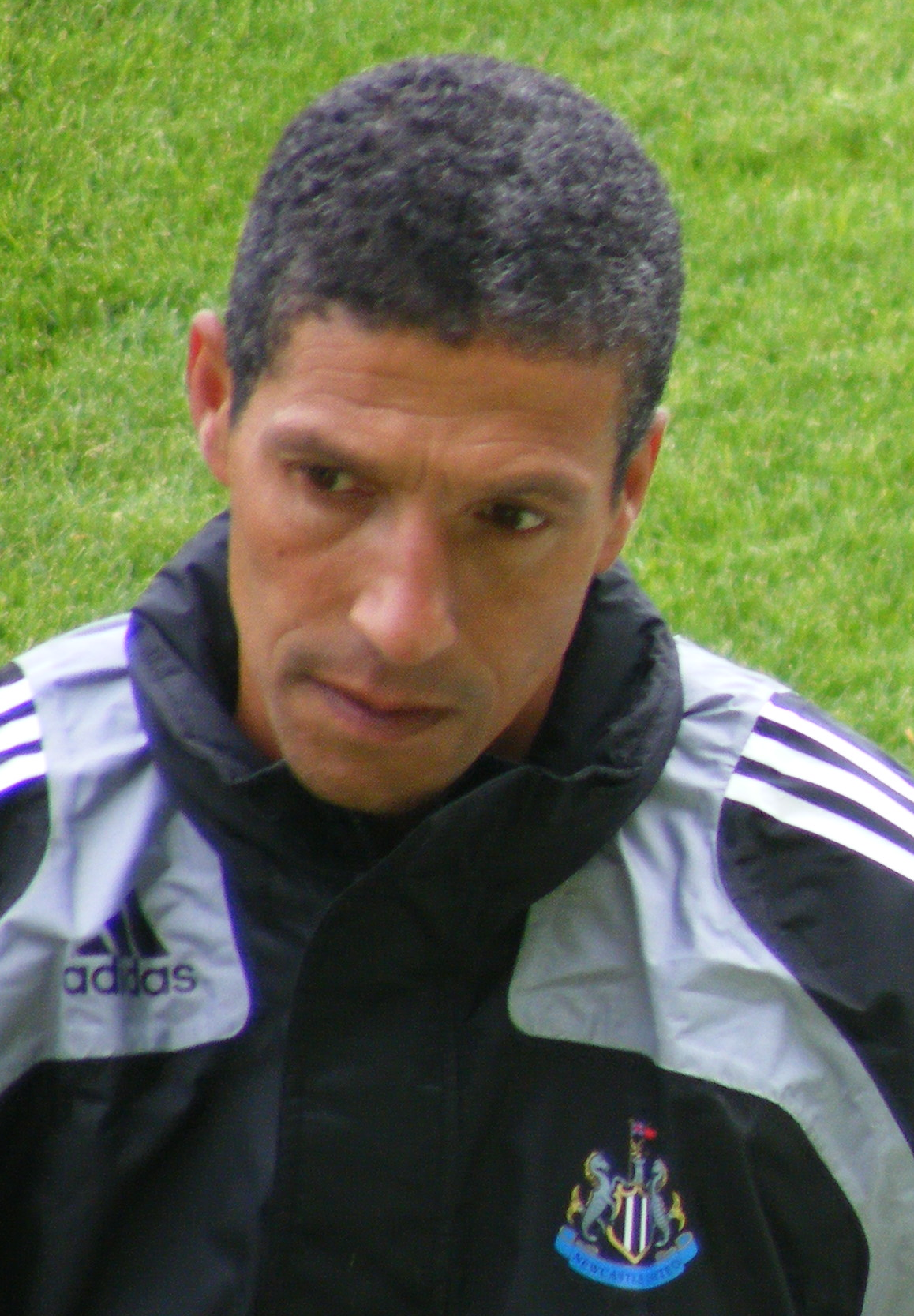
Chris Hughton has won the award 9 times.

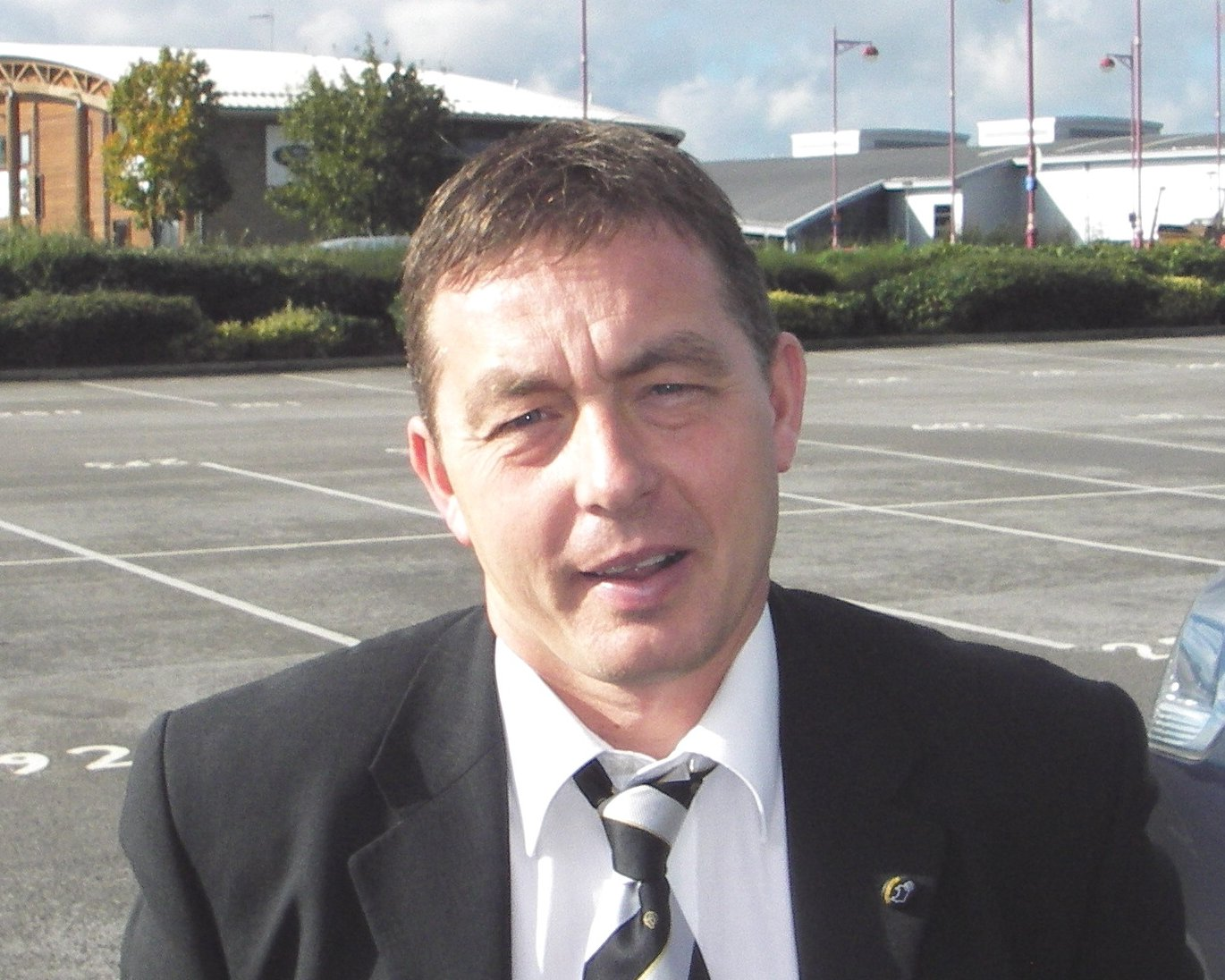
Billy Davies has won the award 7 times.

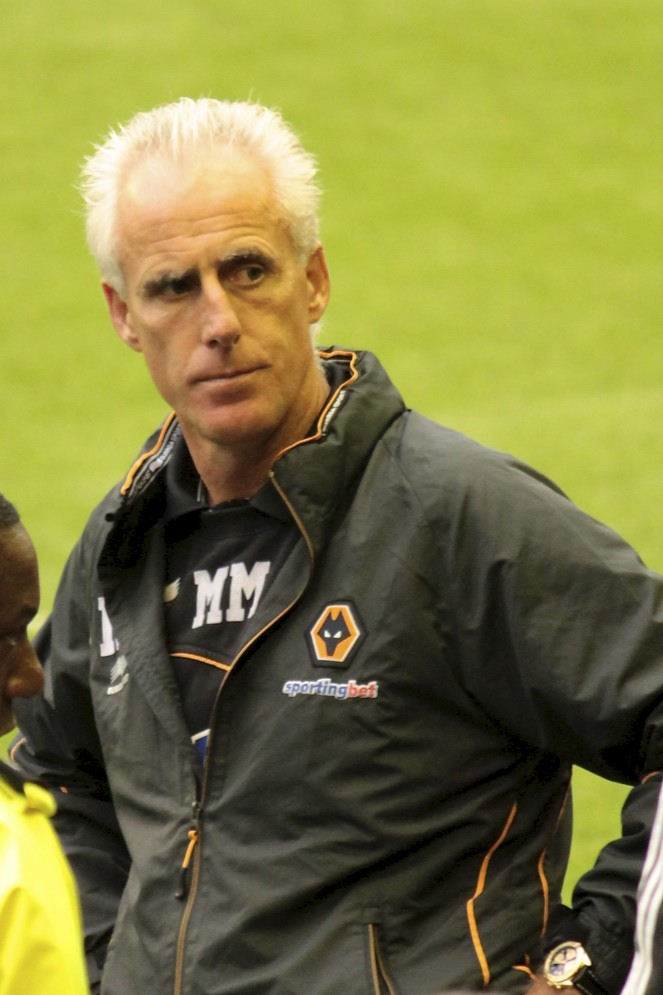
Mick McCarthy has won the award 6 times.

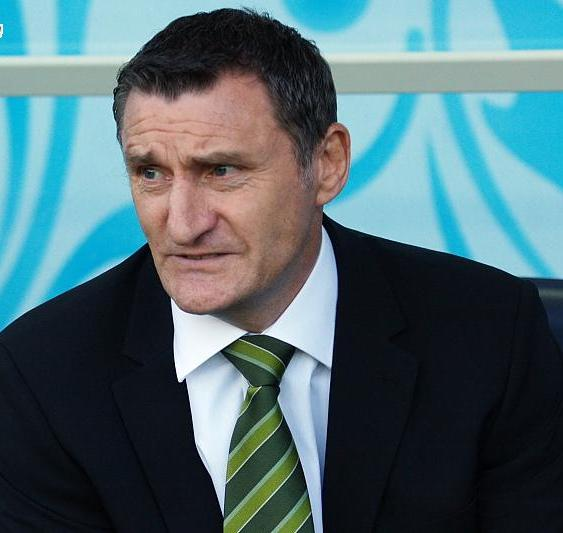
Tony Mowbray has won the award 6 times.

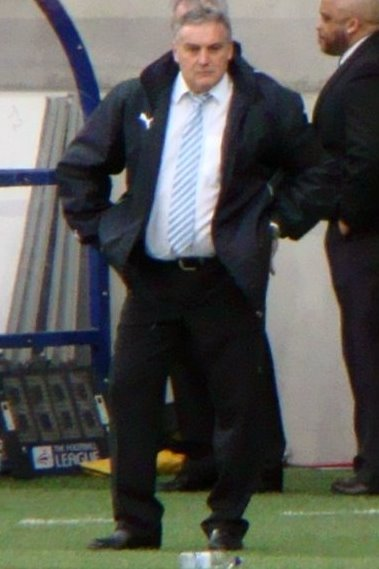
Dave Jones has won the award 5 times.

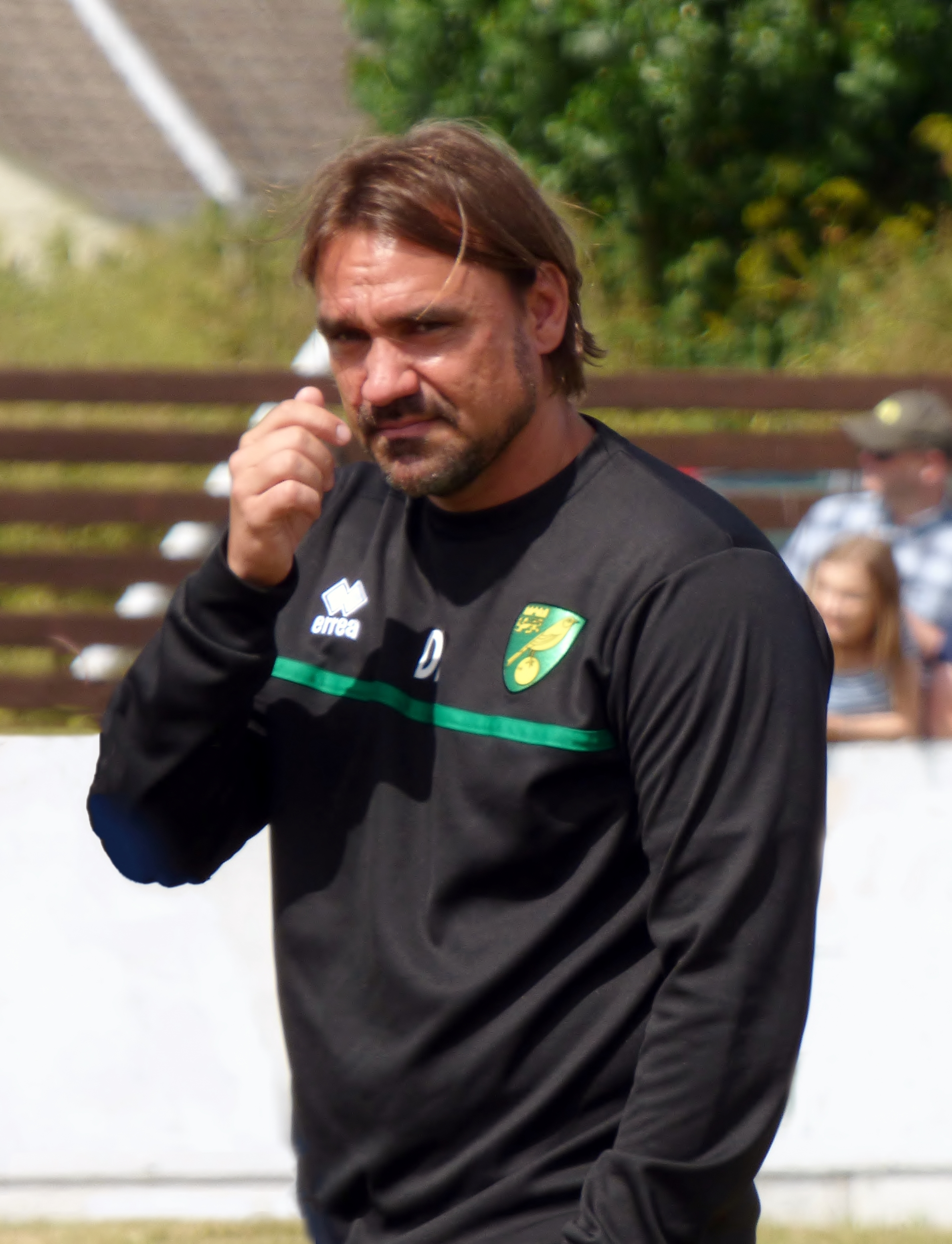
Daniel Farke has won the award 6 times.

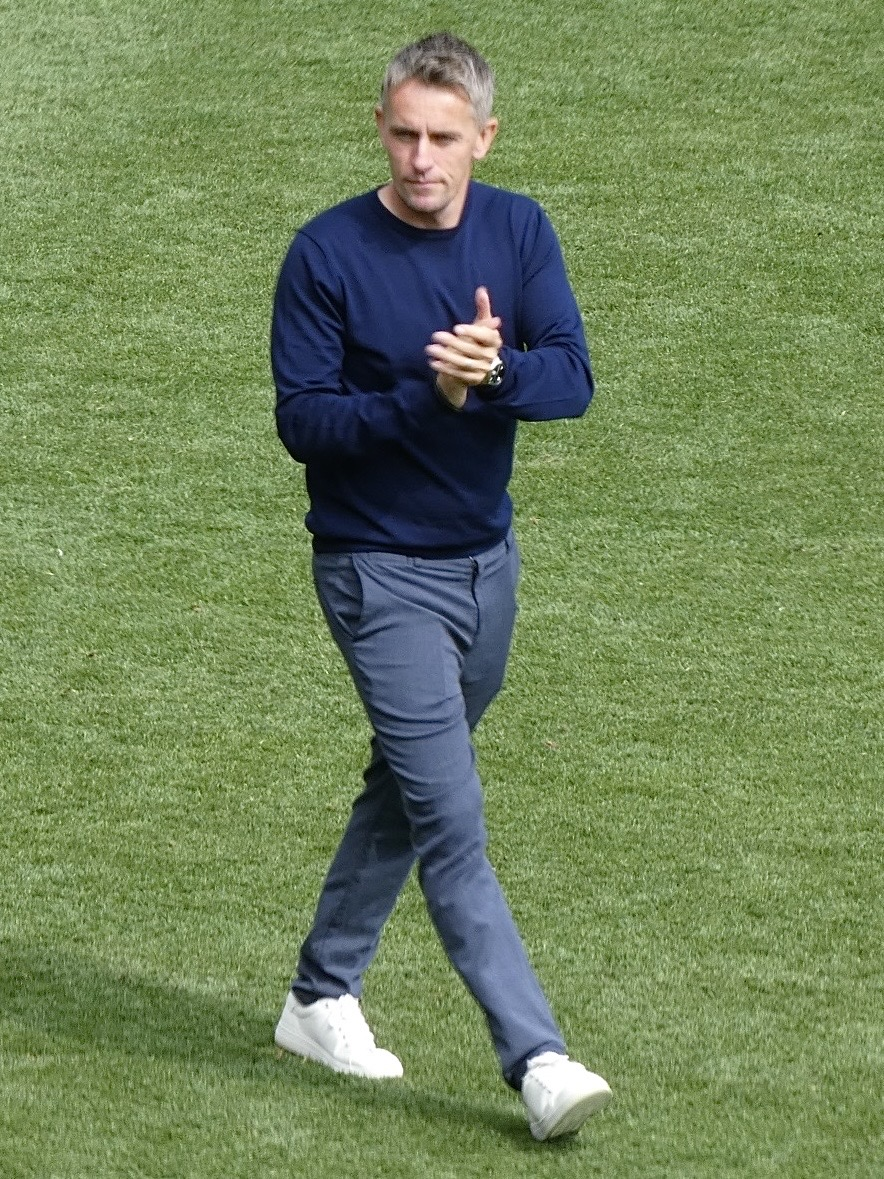
Kieran McKenna has won the award 4 times.

The EFL Championship Manager of the Month is an association football award that recognises the manager adjudged best for each month of the season in the EFL Championship, the second tier of English football. The recipient is chosen by a panel assembled by the League's sponsor and announced alongside the League One and League Two Manager of the Month awards at the beginning of the following month. For sponsorship reasons, from its inception in 2004 until 2010 it was known as the Coca-Cola Manager of the Month award, with the Coca-Cola company sponsoring the league during that period. From the 2010–11 season until the end of the 2012–13 season the league was sponsored by npower and the award was known as the npower Manager of the Month. In July 2013, it was announced that Sky Bet would become the new sponsor of the English Football League, and since August 2013 the award has been known as the Sky Bet Manager of the Month. In November 2017 it was announced that Sky Bet and the EFL had agreed for Sky Bet to continue its sponsorship up until 2024.

Coca-Cola had agreed a three-year deal to become the new sponsor of the English Football League early in 2004, and in June 2004 it was announced that the League would be completely re-branded. The First Division, which had been the second tier of English football since 1992 when 22 clubs broke away to form the Premier League, was renamed The Championship. The Premier League already awarded a Manager of the Month award, since the start of the 1993–94 season, and Coca-Cola introduced a Manager of the Month award for the Championship when they became sponsors at the start of the 2004–05 season; the first recipient was Paul Jewell for his achievements in August 2004 with Wigan Athletic.

Neil Warnock has won the award a record eleven times.

The awards are designed and manufactured in the United Kingdom by bespoke awards company Gaudio Awards.

== List of winners ==
Month	Year (Note: Each year in the table is linked to the corresponding football season.)	Nationality	Manager	Team	Ref
August	2004	England	Paul Jewell	Wigan Athletic	
September	2004	England	Ian Holloway	Queens Park Rangers	
October	2004	England	Paul Jewell	Wigan Athletic	
November	2004	England	Joe Royle	Ipswich Town	
December	2004	England	Neil Warnock	Sheffield United	
January	2005	England	Lennie Lawrence	Cardiff City	
February	2005	Wales	Tony Pulis	Stoke City	
March	2005	Ireland	Mick McCarthy	Sunderland	
April	2005	England	Micky Adams	Coventry City	
August	2005	England	Neil Warnock	Sheffield United	
September	2005	England	Neil Warnock	Sheffield United	
October	2005	England	Steve Coppell	Reading	
November	2005	England	Steve Coppell	Reading	
December	2005	Northern Ireland	Nigel Worthington	Norwich City	
January	2006	Scotland	Billy Davies	Preston North End	
February	2006	England	Aidy Boothroyd	Watford	
March	2006	England	Rob Kelly	Leicester City	
April	2006	Scotland	Billy Davies	Preston North End	
August	2006	England	Dave Jones	Cardiff City	
September	2006	Wales	Geraint Williams	Colchester United	
October	2006	England	Steve Cotterill	Burnley	
November	2006	Scotland	Billy Davies	Derby County	
December	2006	England	Steve Bruce	Birmingham City	
January	2007	Scotland	Billy Davies	Derby County	
February	2007	Ireland	Roy Keane	Sunderland	
March	2007	Ireland	Roy Keane	Sunderland	
April	2007	Wales	Tony Pulis	Stoke City	
August	2007	Northern Ireland	Iain Dowie	Coventry City	
September	2007	England	Tony Mowbray	West Bromwich Albion	
October	2007	England	Aidy Boothroyd	Watford	
November	2007	England	Brian Laws	Sheffield Wednesday	
December	2007	England	Neil Warnock	Crystal Palace	
January	2008	England	Dave Jones	Cardiff City	
February	2008	Wales	Tony Pulis	Stoke City	
March	2008	England	Phil Brown	Hull City	
April	2008	England	Tony Mowbray	West Bromwich Albion	
August	2008	Ireland	Mick McCarthy	Wolverhampton Wanderers	
September	2008	Ireland	Owen Coyle	Burnley	
October	2008	England	Dave Jones	Cardiff City	
November	2008	Ireland	Mick McCarthy	Wolverhampton Wanderers	
December	2008	England	Steve Coppell	Reading	
January	2009	Spain	Roberto Martínez	Swansea City	
February	2009	Wales	Chris Coleman	Coventry City	
March	2009	England	Kevin Blackwell	Sheffield United	
April	2009	Scotland	Alan Irvine	Preston North End	
August	2009	Ireland	Chris Hughton	Newcastle United	
September	2009	Ireland	Chris Hughton	Newcastle United	
October	2009	England	Dave Jones	Cardiff City	
November	2009	Ireland	Chris Hughton	Newcastle United	
December	2009	Scotland	Billy Davies	Nottingham Forest	
January	2010	Scotland	Alan Irvine	Sheffield Wednesday	
February	2010	England	Nigel Pearson	Leicester City	
March	2010	England	Brian McDermott	Reading	
April	2010	Ireland	Chris Hughton	Newcastle United	
August	2010	England	Neil Warnock	Queens Park Rangers	
September	2010	England	Neil Warnock	Queens Park Rangers	
October	2010	England	Dave Jones	Cardiff City	
November	2010	England	Keith Millen	Bristol City	
December	2010	England	Simon Grayson	Leeds United	
January	2011	Scotland	Billy Davies	Nottingham Forest	
February	2011	Northern Ireland	Brendan Rodgers	Swansea City	
March	2011	Scotland	Malky Mackay	Watford	
April	2011	England	Brian McDermott	Reading	
August	2011	Uruguay	Gus Poyet	Brighton & Hove Albion	
September	2011	England	Tony Mowbray	Middlesbrough	
October	2011	Ireland	Chris Hughton	Birmingham City	
November	2011	Scotland	Malky Mackay	Cardiff City	
December	2011	England	Tony Mowbray	Middlesbrough	
January	2012	Ireland	Chris Hughton	Birmingham City	
February	2012	England	Brian McDermott	Reading	
March	2012	England	Brian McDermott	Reading	
April	2012	Wales	Kenny Jackett	Millwall	
August	2012	England	Ian Holloway	Blackpool	
September	2012	Scotland	Dougie Freedman	Crystal Palace	
October	2012	England	Tony Mowbray	Middlesbrough	
November	2012	Wales	Kenny Jackett	Millwall	
December	2012	England	Steve Bruce	Hull City	
January	2013	England	Nigel Pearson	Leicester City	
February	2013	Italy	Gianfranco Zola	Watford	
March	2013	Scotland	Billy Davies	Nottingham Forest	
April	2013	Scotland	Dougie Freedman	Bolton Wanderers	
August	2013	England	Paul Ince	Blackpool	
September	2013	England	Sean Dyche	Burnley	
October	2013	England	Sean Dyche	Burnley	
November	2013	Spain	Óscar García	Brighton & Hove Albion	
December	2013	England	Steve McClaren	Derby County	
January	2014	England	Nigel Pearson	Leicester City	
February	2014	Germany	Uwe Rösler	Wigan Athletic	
March	2014	England	Nigel Pearson	Leicester City	
April	2014	England	Sean Dyche	Burnley	
August	2014	Wales	Kenny Jackett	Wolverhampton Wanderers	
September	2014	Ireland	Mick McCarthy	Ipswich Town	
October	2014	England	Eddie Howe	AFC Bournemouth	
November	2014	England	Mark Warburton	Brentford	
December	2014	England	Eddie Howe	AFC Bournemouth	
January	2015	Spain	Aitor Karanka	Middlesbrough	
February	2015	Scotland	Alex Neil	Norwich City	
March	2015	England	Eddie Howe	AFC Bournemouth	
April	2015	Serbia	Slaviša Jokanović	Watford	
August	2015	Ireland	Chris Hughton	Brighton & Hove Albion	
September	2015	Spain	Aitor Karanka	Middlesbrough	
October	2015	Ireland	Lee Carsley	Brentford	
November	2015	Ireland	Mick McCarthy	Ipswich Town	
December	2015	Spain	Aitor Karanka	Middlesbrough	
January	2016	England	Steve Bruce	Hull City	
February	2016	England	Sean Dyche	Burnley	
March	2016	England	Neil Warnock	Rotherham United	
April	2016	Ireland	Chris Hughton	Brighton & Hove Albion	
August	2016	USA	David Wagner	Huddersfield Town	
September	2016	Scotland	Alex Neil	Norwich City	
October	2016	Spain	Rafael Benítez	Newcastle United	
November	2016	England	Steve McClaren	Derby County	
December	2016	Ireland	Chris Hughton	Brighton & Hove Albion	
January	2017	Netherlands	Jaap Stam	Reading	
February	2017	Germany	David Wagner	Huddersfield Town	
March	2017	Scotland	Paul Lambert	Wolverhampton Wanderers	
April	2017	Portugal	Carlos Carvalhal	Sheffield Wednesday	
August	2017	England	Neil Warnock	Cardiff City	
September	2017	England	Lee Johnson	Bristol City	
October	2017	England	Gary Rowett	Derby County	
November	2017	Portugal	Nuno Espírito Santo	Wolverhampton Wanderers	
December	2017	England	Gary Rowett	Derby County	
January	2018	England	Steve Bruce	Aston Villa	
February	2018	England	Neil Warnock	Cardiff City	
March	2018	England	Neil Warnock	Cardiff City	
April	2018	Serbia	Slaviša Jokanović	Fulham	
August	2018	Argentina	Marcelo Bielsa	Leeds United	
September	2018	Jamaica	Darren Moore	West Bromwich Albion	
October	2018	England	Steve McClaren	Queens Park Rangers	
November	2018	Germany	Daniel Farke	Norwich City	
December	2018	England	Nigel Adkins	Hull City	
January	2019	England	Tony Mowbray	Blackburn Rovers	
February	2019	England	Chris Wilder	Sheffield United	
March	2019	England	Dean Smith	Aston Villa	
April	2019	England	Chris Wilder	Sheffield United	
August	2019	Wales	Steve Cooper	Swansea City	
September	2019	France	Sabri Lamouchi	Nottingham Forest	
October	2019	England	Danny Cowley	Huddersfield Town	
November	2019	Argentina	Marcelo Bielsa	Leeds United	
December	2019	England	Jonathan Woodgate	Middlesbrough	
January	2020	France	Sabri Lamouchi	Nottingham Forest	
February	2020	Croatia	Slaven Bilić	West Bromwich Albion	
June	2020	Denmark	Thomas Frank	Brentford	
July	2020	Argentina	Marcelo Bielsa	Leeds United	
September	2020	Serbia	Veljko Paunović	Reading	
October	2020	England	Neil Warnock	Middlesbrough	
November	2020	Serbia	Vladimir Ivić	Watford	
December	2020	Denmark	Thomas Frank	Brentford	
January	2021	Wales	Steve Cooper	Swansea City	
February	2021	Ireland	Mick McCarthy	Cardiff City	
March	2021	Spain	Xisco Muñoz	Watford	
April	2021	England	Jonathan Woodgate	AFC Bournemouth	
August	2021	Portugal	Marco Silva	Fulham	
September	2021	England	Scott Parker	AFC Bournemouth	
October	2021	England	Scott Parker	AFC Bournemouth	
November	2021	England	Mark Warburton	Queens Park Rangers	
December	2021	England	Chris Wilder	Middlesbrough	
January	2022	Portugal	Marco Silva	Fulham	
February	2022	Spain	Carlos Corberán	Huddersfield Town	
March	2022	Wales	Steve Morison	Cardiff City	
April	2022	Wales	Steve Cooper	Nottingham Forest	
August	2022	England	Paul Heckingbottom	Sheffield United	
September	2022	England	Paul Heckingbottom	Sheffield United	
October	2022	Belgium	Vincent Kompany	Burnley	
November	2022	England	Mark Robins	Coventry City	
December	2022	Belgium	Vincent Kompany	Burnley	
January	2023	Belgium	Vincent Kompany	Burnley	
February	2023	Belgium	Vincent Kompany	Burnley	
March	2023	England	Michael Carrick	Middlesbrough	
April	2023	England	Paul Heckingbottom	Sheffield United	
August	2023	Italy	Enzo Maresca	Leicester City	
September	2023	Northern Ireland	Kieran McKenna	Ipswich Town	
October	2023	Italy	Enzo Maresca	Leicester City	
November	2023	Germany	Daniel Farke	Leeds United	
December	2023	Italy	Enzo Maresca	Leicester City	
January	2024	Germany	Daniel Farke	Leeds United	
February	2024	Germany	Daniel Farke	Leeds United	
March	2024	Northern Ireland	Kieran McKenna	Ipswich Town	
April	2024	Italy	Enzo Maresca	Leicester City	
August	2024	France	Régis Le Bris	Sunderland	
September	2024	England	Chris Wilder	Sheffield United	
October	2024	France	Régis Le Bris	Sunderland	
November	2024	England	Chris Wilder	Sheffield United	
December	2024	Germany	Daniel Farke	Leeds United	
January	2025	England	Gary Rowett	Oxford United	
February	2025	Germany	Daniel Farke	Leeds United	
March	2025	England	Chris Wilder	Sheffield United	
April	2025	England	Scott Parker	Burnley	
August	2025	Wales	Rob Edwards	Middlesbrough	
September	2025	Northern Ireland	Kieran McKenna	Ipswich Town	
October	2025	England	Frank Lampard	Coventry City	
November	2025	England	Frank Lampard	Coventry City	
December	2025	Northern Ireland	Kieran McKenna	Ipswich Town	
January	2026	Sweden	Kim Hellberg	Middlesbrough	
February	2026	Germany	Tonda Eckert	Southampton	
March	2026	Germany	Tonda Eckert	Southampton	
April	2026	Germany	Tonda Eckert	Southampton	
August	2026	Portugal	Vítor Matos	Swansea City	
September	2026	Portugal	Nuno Espírito Santo	West Ham United	
October	2026	Sweden	Kim Hellberg	Middlesbrough	

== Multiple winners ==
Up to and including the October 2026 award.

- The below table lists all the people that have won on more than one occasion.

Rank	Manager	Wins
1st	(England) Neil Warnock	11
2nd	(Republic of Ireland) Chris Hughton	9
3rd	(Scotland) Billy Davies	7
4th	(Germany) Daniel Farke	6
4th	(Republic of Ireland) Mick McCarthy	6
4th	(England) Tony Mowbray	6
4th	(England) Chris Wilder	6
8th	(England) Dave Jones	5
9th	(England) Steve Bruce	4
9th	(England) Sean Dyche	4
9th	(Belgium) Vincent Kompany	4
9th	(Italy) Enzo Maresca	4
9th	(England) Brian McDermott	4
9th	(Northern Ireland) Kieran McKenna	4
9th	(England) Nigel Pearson	4
16th	(Argentina) Marcelo Bielsa	3
16th	(Wales) Steve Cooper	3
16th	(England) Steve Coppell	3
16th	(Germany) Tonda Eckert	3
16th	(England) Paul Heckingbottom	3
16th	(England) Eddie Howe	3
16th	(Wales) Kenny Jackett	3
16th	(Spain) Aitor Karanka	3
16th	(England) Steve McClaren	3
16th	(England) Scott Parker	3
16th	(Wales) Tony Pulis	3
27th	(England) Aidy Boothroyd	2
27th	(Portugal) Nuno Espírito Santo	2
27th	(Denmark) Thomas Frank	2
27th	(Scotland) Dougie Freedman	2
27th	(Sweden) Kim Hellberg	2
27th	(England) Ian Holloway	2
27th	(Scotland) Alan Irvine	2
27th	(England) Paul Jewell	2
27th	(Serbia) Slaviša Jokanović	2
27th	(Republic of Ireland) Roy Keane	2
27th	(France) Sabri Lamouchi	2
27th	(England) Frank Lampard	2
27th	(France) Régis Le Bris	2
27th	(Scotland) Malky Mackay	2
27th	(Scotland) Alex Neil	2
27th	(England) Gary Rowett	2
27th	(England) Mark Warburton	2
27th	(Portugal) Marco Silva	2
27th	(United States) David Wagner	2

== Awards won by nationality ==
Up to and including the October 2026 award.

Country	Wins
England	91
Ireland	19
Scotland	16
Wales	13
Germany	11
Spain	8
Northern Ireland	7
Portugal	6
Italy	5
Belgium	4
Serbia	4
France	4
Argentina	3
Denmark	2
Sweden	2
United States	2
Croatia	1
Jamaica	1
Netherlands	1
Uruguay	1

== Awards won by club ==
Up to and including the October 2026 award.

Club	Wins
Middlesbrough	13
Cardiff City	12
Sheffield United	12
Burnley	11
Leeds United	10
Leicester City	9
Reading	9
Ipswich Town	7
Watford	7
AFC Bournemouth	6
Coventry City	6
Derby County	6
Nottingham Forest	6
Brighton & Hove Albion	5
Newcastle United	5
Queens Park Rangers	5
Sunderland	5
Swansea City	5
Wolverhampton Wanderers	5
Brentford	4
Huddersfield Town	4
Hull City	4
Norwich City	4
West Bromwich Albion	4
Birmingham City	3
Fulham	3
Preston North End	3
Sheffield Wednesday	3
Southampton	3
Stoke City	3
Wigan Athletic	3
Aston Villa	2
Blackpool	2
Bristol City	2
Crystal Palace	2
Millwall	2
Blackburn Rovers	1
Bolton Wanderers	1
Colchester United	1
Oxford United	1
Rotherham United	1
West Ham United	1

== See also ==
- EFL Championship Player of the Month
