= Chris Wilder =

English association football manager (born 1967)

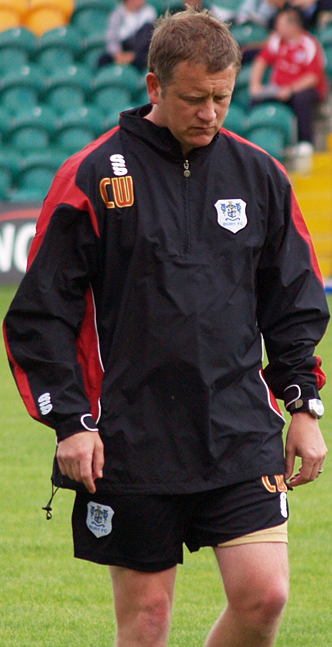
- Wilder in 2008

Personal information
- Full name: Christopher John Wilder
- Date of birth: 23 September 1967 (age 59)
- Place of birth: Stocksbridge, West Riding of Yorkshire, England
- Height: 5 ft 11 in (1.80 m)
- Position: Right-back

Team information
- Current team: Sheffield United (manager)

Youth career
- 1982–1986: Southampton

Senior career*
Years	Team	Apps	(Gls)
1986–1992	Sheffield United	93	(1)
1989	→ Walsall (loan)	4	(0)
1990	→ Charlton Athletic (loan)	1	(0)
1991	→ Charlton Athletic (loan)	2	(0)
1992	→ Leyton Orient (loan)	16	(1)
1992–1996	Rotherham United	132	(11)
1996–1997	Notts County	46	(0)
1997–1998	Bradford City	42	(0)
1998–1999	Sheffield United	12	(0)
1998	→ Northampton Town (loan)	1	(0)
1999	→ Lincoln City (loan)	3	(0)
1999	Brighton & Hove Albion	11	(0)
1999–2001	Halifax Town	51	(1)
Total		414	(14)

Managerial career
- 2001–2002: Alfreton Town
- 2002–2008: Halifax Town
- 2008–2014: Oxford United
- 2014–2016: Northampton Town
- 2016–2021: Sheffield United
- 2021–2022: Middlesbrough
- 2023: Watford
- 2023–2025: Sheffield United
- 2025–: Sheffield United
- * Club domestic league appearances and goals

Christopher John Wilder (born 23 September 1967) is an English professional football manager who formerly played as a right-back. He is the manager of EFL Championship club Sheffield United.

Wilder's extensive professional playing career saw spells at Sheffield United (twice), Rotherham United, Notts County, Bradford City, Brighton & Hove Albion and Halifax Town. He also had loan spells at five clubs.

After retiring, he became a manager and was in charge of Alfreton Town, Halifax Town (their last manager before liquidation), Oxford United, Northampton Town, Sheffield United, Middlesbrough and Watford. He won promotion from the Conference Premier with Oxford via the play-offs in 2010, from League Two as champions with Northampton in 2016, from League One with Sheffield United as champions in 2017, and from the Championship with the same club two years later.

== Early life ==
Christopher John Wilder was born on 23 September 1967 in Stocksbridge, West Riding of Yorkshire (now South Yorkshire).

== Playing career ==
Wilder started his football career as a trainee at Southampton and was released without making it into the first team.

He moved on to Sheffield United in August 1986. In December 1987, defender Wilder was sent off for a crude tackle on Millwall's Jimmy Carter in a season which saw the Sheffield club relegated to the third division. The following season Wilder was on the receiving end, being elbowed in the face. Swansea's Bryan Wade received a three match ban for violent conduct as a result. Wilder was a regular in the team that finished second and therefore clinched promotion back to the second division at the first attempt in the 1988–89 season, and was also part of the squad that gained a further promotion the season after, this time back to the first division, after an absence of fourteen years. Wilder was a regular during the following season back in the first division, but thereafter found appearances harder to come by, hence Wilder left for nearby Rotherham United in 1992, staying for a further four years and amassing his largest number of games and goals for one club.

In 1998, Wilder returned to Sheffield United, and a year later he was brought to Brighton & Hove Albion by Micky Adams before joining Halifax Town that same year.

== Managerial career ==
=== Alfreton Town ===
Wilder began his career in management at Alfreton Town. He took over at the club in late October 2001 and in the 27 weeks he was in charge won four trophies: the Northern Counties (East) League Premier Division, the League Cup, the President's Cup and the Derbyshire Senior Cup.

=== Halifax Town ===
Wilder returned to Halifax Town as manager on 2 July 2002. He replaced caretaker manager Neil Redfearn, who had in turn replaced Alan Little (who left on 8 April after falling ill with appendicitis in March). Halifax had been relegated to the Conference at the end of the season.

Wilder was in charge at Halifax for more than 300 games until the club went into liquidation on 30 June 2008, and he decided to join former Halifax defender Alan Knill, as the assistant manager of Bury.

=== Oxford United ===
After fewer than six months at Gigg Lane, Wilder was appointed as the manager of Conference National club Oxford United on 21 December 2008 (replacing Jim Smith who had been caretaker manager in the wake of Darren Patterson's dismissal), where he only just missed out on a play-off place in his first season. Wilder's first full season in charge of Oxford began successfully and by mid-season they were top of the Conference table by five points with a game in hand. However, Oxford were overtaken by Stevenage, who would go on to win the title and take the automatic promotion place, consigning the Us to the playoffs with Luton Town, Rushden & Diamonds and York City. They defeated Rushden & Diamonds to reach the play-off final, and gained promotion to the Football League by beating York City 3–1.

In their first season back in the Football League in four years, Wilder guided Oxford to mid-table safety. The team finished 12th, in the top half of the table, their highest finish in seven years. The next season Oxford finished ninth, after poor form late in the season led to the team dropping out of the play-off position they had occupied for most of the year. Oxford's chairman Kelvin Thomas gave Wilder his backing, meaning he would remain manager for the 2012–13 season. Despite failing to achieve a play-off place again in Oxford's third season back in the League, and intense speculation about his future at the club, Wilder was offered and accepted a further one-year contract for the 2013–14 season.

On 26 January 2014 he resigned as Oxford manager with the intention of joining League Two rivals Northampton Town as their manager.

=== Northampton Town ===
On 27 January 2014, Wilder was appointed manager of Northampton Town, signing a three-and-a-half-year contract. Wilder successfully battled against relegation to the Conference, after taking over the club in the relegation zone in League 2. He led the side to a mid-table finish in the 2014–15 season, and then to the League Two title the following season with 99 points, despite significant financial difficulties at the club resulting in players and staff not being paid during October and November 2015.

=== Sheffield United ===
On 12 May 2016, Wilder joined his boyhood club Sheffield United as their new manager on a three-year contract, following the parting of company with Nigel Adkins. In the pre-season, despite little financial backing, he was able to bring some new players in, many of which were free transfers. He then made Sheffield born Billy Sharp club captain. However, Wilder's League One managerial debut got off to a poor start, only gaining a single point from the first four games, which left Sheffield United at the bottom of League One. Despite this, the club pushed on and went on to become League One Champions, securing 100 points in the process, a club record.

Wilder began his second season at the club with a 1–0 win for Sheffield United in the Championship against Brentford. In September 2017, United beat city rivals Sheffield Wednesday 4–2 at Hillsborough, a record for goals scored by United against Wednesday at Hillsborough. By the end of October, after defeating Yorkshire rivals Leeds United 2–1 at Elland Road, Sheffield United were top of the Championship.

On 28 April 2019, it was confirmed that Wilder had led the Blades to the Premier League following nearest rival Leeds' 1–1 draw at home. This ensured his second promotion in three years at the club. The achievement earned him the LMA Manager of the Year award.

In July 2019, Wilder signed a new three-year contract with the club. On 10 January 2020, Wilder signed a four-year contract extension with the club. Sheffield United went on to finish ninth in their first season back in the top flight, their best since 1991–92.

On 13 March 2021, Wilder left the club by mutual consent, with the club bottom of the Premier League, with 14 points from 28 games.

=== Middlesbrough ===
On 7 November 2021, Wilder was appointed manager of Middlesbrough after the club parted ways with Neil Warnock. After an unbeaten month which saw Boro win four out of their five matches, Wilder was awarded the EFL Championship Manager of the Month award for December 2021 with his wing-back Isaiah Jones winning the Player of the Month award. Wilder was dismissed on 3 October 2022 with the club in the bottom three of the Championship. They had won only two of 11 league games played in the 2022–23 season.

=== Watford ===
On 7 March 2023, Wilder was appointed manager of Watford on a contract until the end of the season after parting company with Slaven Bilić. On 10 May 2023, Wilder was replaced as head coach by Valérien Ismaël, after Wilder's short-term contract came to an end after the final match of the season.

=== Return to Sheffield United ===
On 5 December 2023, Paul Heckingbottom was dismissed by Sheffield United after a 5–0 loss to Burnley that left the club at the bottom of the Premier League. Wilder was brought in to replace him.

After a 3–2 loss to Crystal Palace on 30 January 2024, Wilder criticised referee Tony Harrington's performance, calling it "ridiculous" and pointing to decisions made against Sheffield United during the game. He went on to criticise one of the assistant referees for eating a sandwich when talking to him after the game, describing it as a "lack of respect". He was fined £11,500 by the FA on 20 February, with them stating that his comments "imply bias and/or attack the integrity of the referee, or referees generally, and/or bring the game into disrepute".

Despite Wilder's return to Bramall Lane, Sheffield United were relegated on 27 April 2024, following their 5–1 defeat by Newcastle United.

Following a strong start to the 2024–25 season, Wilder was named Championship Manager of the Month for September 2024 following ten points from four matches. He was again named manager of the month for November 2024, following a run of 16 points from six games which elevated The Blades to first position in the Championship. He once again received the award for March 2025 following thirteen points from five matches as they continued their hunt for automatic promotion. They finished third in the EFL Championship but lost to Sunderland in the play-off final. After failing to gain promotion to the Premier League, Wilder's contact was terminated in June 2025.

On 15 September 2025, Wilder returned to Sheffield United on a contract until the end of the 2026–27 season following the dismissal of Rubén Sellés. On 30 September, Wilder received a red card for accidentally kicking a ball into a fan at half-time during a game against Southampton.

== Career statistics ==
Appearances and goals by club, season and competition
Club	Season	League			FA Cup		League Cup		Other		Total	
Club	Season	Division	Apps	Goals	Apps	Goals	Apps	Goals	Apps	Goals	Apps	Goals
Sheffield United	1986–87	Second Division	11	0	3	0	0	0	0	0	14	0
Sheffield United	1987–88	Second Division	25	0	0	0	2	0	1 (Note: Appearance in Third Division play-offs)	0	28	0
Sheffield United	1988–89	Third Division	29	1	3	0	5	0	1 (Note: Appearances in Football League Trophy)	0	38	1
Sheffield United	1989–90	Second Division	8	0	0	0	0	0	0	0	8	0
Sheffield United	1990–91	First Division	16	0	1	0	1	0	1 (Note: Appearances in Full Members' Cup)	0	19	0
Sheffield United	1991–92	First Division	4	0	0	0	1	0	0	0	5	0
Sheffield United	Total		93	1	7	0	9	0	3	0	112	1
Walsall (loan)	1989–90	Third Division	4	0	1	0	0	0	2	0	7	0
Charlton Athletic (loan)	1990–91	Second Division	1	0	0	0	0	0	0	0	1	0
Charlton Athletic (loan)	1991–92	Second Division	2	0	0	0	0	0	0	0	2	0
Leyton Orient (loan)	1991–92	Third Division	16	1	0	0	0	0	1	0	17	1
Rotherham United	1992–93	Second Division	32	8	3	0	2	0	1	0	38	8
Rotherham United	1993–94	Second Division	37	2	1	1	3	0	2	0	43	3
Rotherham United	1994–95	Second Division	45	1	3	0	2	0	3	0	53	1
Rotherham United	1995–96	Second Division	18	0	1	0	4	0	1	0	24	0
Rotherham United	Total		132	11	8	1	11	0	7	0	158	12
Notts County	1995–96	Second Division	9	0	0	0	0	0	0	0	9	0
Notts County	1996–97	Second Division	37	0	4	0	2	0	1	0	44	0
Notts County	Total		46	0	4	0	2	0	1	0	53	0
Bradford City	1996–97	First Division	7	0	0	0	0	0	0	0	7	0
Bradford City	1997–98	First Division	35	0	1	0	2	0	0	0	38	0
Bradford City	Total		42	0	1	0	2	0	0	0	45	0
Sheffield United	1997–98	First Division	8	0	0	0	0	0	1 (Note: Appearance in First Division play-offs)	0	9	0
Sheffield United	1998–99	First Division	4	0	0	0	1	0	0	0	5	0
Sheffield United	Total		12	0	0	0	1	0	1	0	14	0
Northampton Town (loan)	1998–99	Second Division	1	0	0	0	0	0	0	0	1	0
Lincoln City (loan)	1998–99	Second Division	3	0	0	0	0	0	0	0	3	0
Brighton & Hove Albion	1999–2000	Third Division	11	0	0	0	2	0	0	0	13	0
Halifax Town	1999–2000	Third Division	31	1	3	0	0	0	1	0	35	1
Halifax Town	2000–01	Third Division	20	0	1	0	1	0	1	0	23	0
Halifax Town	Total		51	1	4	0	1	0	2	0	58	1
Career total			414	14	25	1	28	0	17	0	484	15

== Managerial statistics ==
As of match played 21 November 2026

Managerial record by team and tenure
Team	From	To	Record					Ref.
Team	From	To	P	W	D	L	Win %	Ref.
Halifax Town	2 July 2002	30 June 2008	312	120	77	115	38.5	
Oxford United	21 December 2008	26 January 2014	269	121	70	78	45.0	
Northampton Town	27 January 2014	12 May 2016	126	61	28	37	48.4	
Sheffield United	12 May 2016	13 March 2021	227	106	47	74	46.7	
Middlesbrough	7 November 2021	3 October 2022	45	18	11	16	40.0	
Watford	7 March 2023	10 May 2023	11	3	3	5	27.3	
Sheffield United	5 December 2023	18 June 2025	78	34	13	31	43.6	
Sheffield United	15 September 2025	Present	61	27	10	24	44.3	
Total			1,129	490	259	380	43.4	

== Honours ==
=== Player ===
Individual

- PFA Team of the Year: 1995–96 Second Division

=== Manager ===
Alfreton Town

- Northern Counties East Football League Premier Division: 2001–02
- Northern Counties East Football League League Cup: 2001–02
- Northern Counties East Football League President's Cup: 2001–02
- Derbyshire Senior Cup: 2001–02

Halifax Town

- West Riding County Cup: 2003–04

Oxford United

- Conference Premier play-offs: 2010

Northampton Town

- Football League Two: 2015–16

Sheffield United

- EFL League One: 2016–17
- EFL Championship runner-up: 2018–19

Individual

- Football Conference Manager of the Month: January 2003
- The Football League / EFL Manager of the Season: 2015–16, 2018–19
- LMA League Two Manager of the Year: 2015–16
- LMA League One Manager of the Year: 2016–17
- LMA Special Achievement Award: 2016–17
- LMA Championship Manager of the Year: 2018–19
- LMA Manager of the Year: 2018–19
- EFL Championship Manager of the Month: February 2019, April 2019, December 2021, September 2024, November 2024, March 2025
- EFL League One Manager of the Month: April 2017
- Football League Two Manager of the Month: January 2015, November 2015, January 2016, February 2016

== See also ==
- List of football managers with the most matches
