= Tonda Eckert =

Football coach (born 1993)

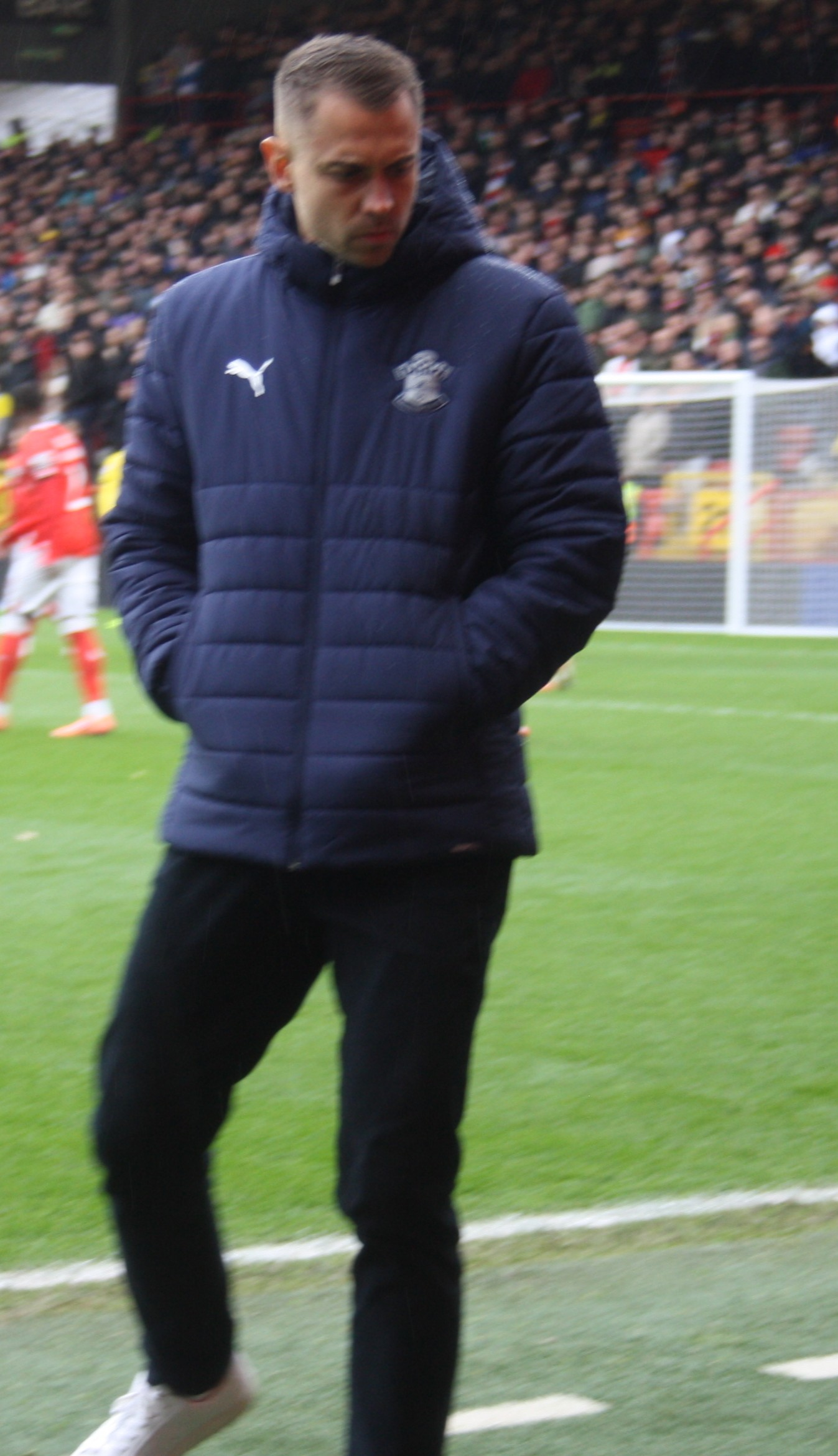
- Eckert with Southampton in 2025

Personal information
- Date of birth: 31 January 1993 (age 33)
- Place of birth: Neukölln, Berlin, Germany
- Position: Central midfielder

Team information
- Current team: Southampton (head coach)

Senior career*
Years	Team	Apps	(Gls)
- Viktoria Arnoldsweiler

Managerial career
- 2025–: Southampton
- * Club domestic league appearances and goals

Tonda Eckert (born 31 January 1993) is a German professional football coach who is the head coach of EFL Championship club Southampton.

== Coaching career ==
=== Early life and career ===
Eckert was born on 31 January 1993 in the Neukölln borough of Berlin, Germany. His father is a retired computer scientist who worked in areas such as blockchain technology and video surveillance.

Eckert aspired to a career in sports, having studied at the Sporthochschule Köln in Cologne. He played football at an amateur level, making several appearances for Viktoria Arnoldsweiler in the Mittelrheinliga (fifth tier) in the spring of 2016. By that time he had already worked for Germany's national team as an analyst at UEFA Euro 2012 and the 2014 FIFA World Cup, also studying the culture of the adversary nation and what it might mean for the DNA of their team.

As a coach, Eckert was assistant coach of the under-17 team at 1. FC Köln from 2013 to 2016, before becoming assistant coach to Marco Rose of Red Bull Salzburg's under-18 team in the 2016–17 season, when the team won the 2016–17 UEFA Youth League. Within the Red Bull group, he moved to RB Leipzig in 2017, where he spent two years as assistant coach of the under-19 team, initially under Robert Klauß and then under Alexander Blessin. In the 2019–20 season, he was assistant coach to Miroslav Klose with FC Bayern Munich's under-17 team.

Moving from his native Germany to England, Eckert was appointed assistant manager to Gerhard Struber (whom he already knew from Salzburg) at Barnsley in August 2020, remaining in post until January 2022. During the same month, he joined Genoa as assistant to Alexander Blessin, staying in Italy for three years and a half, using his time there to get his UEFA Pro Licence.

=== Southampton ===
==== 2025–2026 ====
In July 2025, Eckert was appointed under-21s head coach at Southampton. Following the dismissal of Will Still on 2 November, Eckert was appointed interim head coach of the senior team. His first match as head coach was a 2–1 victory away to Queens Park Rangers on 5 November. This was followed by further victories: 3–1 at home to Sheffield Wednesday on 8 November and 5–1 away to Charlton Athletic on 22 November. On 5 December, Eckert was appointed as manager on a permanent basis. On 13 March 2026, Eckert was awarded the EFL Championship Manager of the Month for February after Southampton picked up 13 points from a possible 15. Continued good form in March saw him win the award for a second consecutive month, picking up 10 out of 12 possible points. Following 14 points from six matches in April, Eckert won the EFL Championship Manager of the Month for a third time in a row.

==== Espionage incident ====
In May 2026, Southampton were accused of improperly recording training sessions of Middlesbrough prior to their EFL Championship play-offs semi-final contest. Southampton initially claimed that the surveillance was implemented without order from club leadership or members of the coaching staff, though they later admitted to spying on Middlesbrough along with two other teams in the EFL Championship. According to The Daily Telegraph, Eckert allegedly took responsibility for the decision to spy on other teams and claimed that he was unaware it was against the FA's rules on scouting opponents. Southampton were expelled from the EFL Championship play-offs and deducted four points for the 2026–27 season as punishment for the rule breaches. It was subsequently reported that the FA was considering charging Eckert with misconduct over the spying scandal.

On 21 May, the Independent Disciplinary Commission's written reasons were published and revealed Eckert had authorised a "contrived and determined plan" to spy on opponents in a "deplorable approach". On 2 June, Southampton owner Dragan Šolak said he would not dismiss Eckert. The same day, Eckert publicly apologised to the players, staff and supporters.

On 22 July, the FA charged Eckert with three breaches of FA rule E3.1 in relation to misconduct between December 2025 and May 2026. On 7 October, Eckert received a six-week ban from all professional football, suspended until the end of 2027–28 season, and a £28,000 fine.

==== 2026–present ====
On 20 November 2026, Eckert signed a three-year contract extension.

== Managerial statistics ==
As of match played 21 November 2026

Managerial record by team and tenure
Team	From	To	Record				
Team	From	To	P	W	D	L	Win %
Southampton	2 November 2025	Present	58	35	13	10	60.3
Total			58	35	13	10	60.3

== Honours ==
Individual

- EFL Championship Manager of the Month: February 2026, March 2026, April 2026
