= Steve Cooper (football manager) =

Welsh football manager (born 1979)

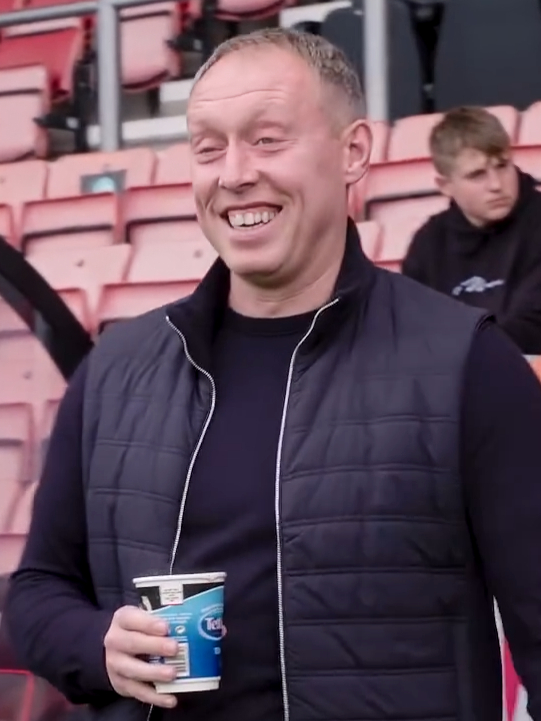
- Cooper with Nottingham Forest in 2022

Personal information
- Full name: Steven Daniel Cooper
- Date of birth: 10 December 1979 (age 46)
- Place of birth: Pontypridd, Wales
- Position: Defender

Senior career*
Years	Team	Apps	(Gls)
1998–1999	Wrexham	0	(0)
1999	Total Network Solutions	4	(1)
2000	Rhyl	4	(0)
2000–2002	Bangor City	57	(3)
2003	Porthmadog		

Managerial career
- 2014–2015: England U16
- 2015–2019: England U17
- 2019–2021: Swansea City
- 2021–2023: Nottingham Forest
- 2024: Leicester City
- 2025–2026: Brøndby
Medal record
Men's football
Representing England (as manager)
FIFA U-17 World Cup
Winner	2017
- * Club domestic league appearances and goals

Steven Daniel Cooper (born 10 December 1979) is a Welsh professional football manager and former player who most recently was the manager of Danish Superliga club Brøndby.

Cooper began his coaching career at Wrexham's academy while playing as a defender in the Welsh football leagues. He moved to Liverpool in 2008 and was appointed manager of their academy in 2011. Cooper joined the England youth set-up in 2014, initially coaching the U16s, before winning the 2017 FIFA U-17 World Cup with the U17s. He became head coach of Swansea City in 2019 before managing Nottingham Forest from 2021 to 2023. He then became the manager of Leicester City.

== Early life ==
Steven Daniel Cooper was born on 10 December 1979 in Pontypridd, Wales, and raised in nearby Hopkinstown. He is the son of Welsh former football referee Keith Cooper. As a youngster, Cooper played football in the Rhondda leagues and was a Liverpool supporter.

== Playing career ==
In the late 1990s, Cooper joined Wrexham but did not make an appearance for the club. He was signed by manager Brian Flynn, who suggested Cooper pursue a coaching career instead of playing professionally. Cooper later played for Total Network Solutions (now called The New Saints), Rhyl, Bangor City and Porthmadog in the Welsh football leagues. He featured for Bangor City in the UEFA Cup against Sartid Smederevo in 2002.

== Managerial career ==
=== Early coaching ===
While a player, Cooper studied for his coaching badges and began coaching at Wrexham's academy. At the age of 27, Cooper obtained his UEFA Pro Licence, becoming one of the youngest coaches to achieve the qualification.

After several years coaching at Wrexham's academy, Cooper became the club's head of youth development. On 3 September 2008, Cooper was appointed as a youth coach at Liverpool, initially taking charge of the under-12s. On 18 July 2011, he was named manager of Liverpool's academy. Cooper coached the under-18s for the 2012–13 season, leading them to the semi-finals of the FA Youth Cup, where they lost to Chelsea. While at Liverpool, Cooper oversaw the development of such players as Raheem Sterling, Trent Alexander-Arnold and Ben Woodburn. In 2013, Cooper joined the FA as a youth coach educator and also taught on the FA Wales A Licence course.

=== England youth ===
On 13 October 2014, Cooper was appointed as manager of the England national under-16 team. The following year, he took charge of the under-17s, coaching players such as Jadon Sancho, Phil Foden and Callum Hudson-Odoi. Cooper led his side to the final of the 2017 UEFA European U17 Championship, where they lost to Spain 4–1 on penalties following a 2–2 draw. Cooper's U17s then won the 2017 FIFA U17 World Cup in October 2017, beating Brazil 3–1 in the semi-final and Spain 5–2 in the final.

The following year, Cooper's side reached the semi-finals of the 2018 UEFA European U17 Championship, where they lost to Netherlands on penalties. They did not qualify for the quarter-finals of the 2019 UEFA European U17 Championship, despite beating Sweden 3–1 in their final group game. During his time at England, Cooper oversaw a specialised coaching model which included in-possession and out-of-possession coaches. He was also responsible for the coaching programme and curriculum for the under-15s. On training young players, Cooper said, "Sometimes I will talk and tell the players my thoughts, but most of the time I facilitate... that's how players learn, as a modern player. The days are gone, for me, where everything is the coach telling the player, that's finished."

=== Swansea City ===
Cooper was appointed head coach of Championship club Swansea City on 13 June 2019 on a three-year contract. His first match was a 2–1 win against Hull City at the Liberty Stadium, with goals from Borja Bastón and Mike van der Hoorn. Cooper was named the EFL's Championship Manager of the Month for August after Swansea's unbeaten start to the season saw them move top of the league, with 16 points from 18. This was Swansea's best start to a season in 41 years.

During the January transfer window, Cooper signed Rhian Brewster, Marc Guéhi and Conor Gallagher (all of whom Cooper had coached in the England set-up) on loan from Liverpool and Chelsea respectively. Following the outbreak of COVID-19 and subsequent pandemic, the Championship season was suspended indefinitely, with Swansea in 11th place and three points from the play-offs. The season restarted on 20 June. On the final day of the season, Swansea beat Reading 4–1 to finish sixth, moving into the play-offs ahead of Nottingham Forest on goal difference. They were defeated by Brentford 3–2 on aggregate in the semi-final.

In his second season, Cooper again led Swansea to the play-offs, despite criticism of his style of play and Swansea's poor form towards the end of the season. They drew 2–2 with Reading on 25 April 2021 to secure their play-off place, with two league games left in the season. This was Cooper's 100th game in charge. Swansea finished 4th in the league but lost the play-off final to Brentford. He left the club by mutual consent in July 2021.

=== Nottingham Forest ===
Cooper was appointed head coach at Championship club Nottingham Forest on 21 September 2021 on a two-year contract. At this point, Nottingham Forest were bottom of the division. Cooper improved Forest's style of play by encouraging them to be confident with the ball and attack in greater numbers. He also improved the mentality of the players – fostering a greater sense of togetherness, and instilling a 'big club mentality'. On 29 May 2022, Cooper led Nottingham Forest to promotion to the Premier League, after a 1–0 win over Huddersfield Town in the Championship play-off final at Wembley Stadium.

On 7 October 2022, he signed a new contract with the club until 2025. On 5 April 2023, after a string of poor results and reports that Cooper was at risk of dismissal, club owner Evangelos Marinakis stated that he still had faith in Cooper, but added results and performances must "improve immediately". Forest secured their Premier League status on 20 May 2023, following a 1–0 home victory against Arsenal.

On 19 December 2023, Cooper was dismissed as manager of Nottingham Forest. A run of just one win in 13 matches had left the club in 17th place in the table. A day later, he was replaced by Nuno Espírito Santo.

=== Leicester City ===
On 20 June 2024, Cooper was appointed as manager of newly promoted Premier League side Leicester City on a three-year contract.

Following a winless run of five games, Cooper was dismissed on 24 November 2024, following a 1–2 home defeat against Chelsea while being managed by Enzo Maresca, the ex-manager of Leicester City. Leicester were 16th in the league table, having only won two of the first twelve matches and being knocked out from the League Cup by Manchester United. It was later announced that Ruud van Nistelrooy would be appointed as his successor and become Leicester City's new manager.

=== Brøndby ===
On 9 September 2025, Cooper was appointed manager of Danish Superliga side Brøndby. In February and March 2026 his team set the unfortunate record for most matches without scoring a goal (6). On 7 April his team finally scored, but would go on to lose 2–1 to FC Nordsjælland, leaving them winless in 10 matches. On 17 April he ended the 11 game winless run with a 6–0 win over Sønderjyske. After losing the UEFA Conference League play-off match to rivals FC Copenhagen he was released of his contract. He left Brøndby with the second lowest points per game ever with 1.32, only behind Auri Skarbalius' 1.29.

== Style of coaching ==
We want to play with purpose, dominate possession, play forward, and get the ball back as quick as we can.

— Cooper on his preferred style of play, 25 October 2017

Cooper likes his teams to play with "good organisation and structure". He prefers his teams to control the game by being brave on the ball and confident when passing. Cooper coaches his teams to have tactical discipline; defensively, he prefers his players to regain possession through composure and aggression.

Cooper cites former Barcelona B coach José Segura as his main influence; the pair worked together at Liverpool's academy. Tactically, Cooper likes to deploy a 4–2–3–1 with two holding midfielders and attacking wing-backs. He has also used a 5–3–2 or 3–5–2 formation to ensure greater defensive stability and more flexibility in attack.

== Managerial statistics ==
As of match played 21 May 2026

Managerial record by team and tenure
Team	From	To	Record					Ref.
Team	From	To	P	W	D	L	Win %	Ref.
England U16	13 October 2014	28 July 2015	8	4	2	2	50.00	
England U17	28 July 2015	13 June 2019	66	45	11	10	68.18	
Swansea City	13 June 2019	21 July 2021	105	47	28	30	44.76	
Nottingham Forest	21 September 2021	19 December 2023	108	42	27	39	38.89	
Leicester City	20 June 2024	24 November 2024	15	3	5	7	20.00	
Brøndby	9 September 2025	22 May 2026	28	10	6	12	35.71	
Total			330	151	79	100	45.76	

== Honours ==
=== Manager ===
England U17

- FIFA U-17 World Cup: 2017
- UEFA European Under-17 Championship runner-up: 2017

Nottingham Forest

- EFL Championship play-offs: 2022

Individual

- EFL Championship Manager of the Month: August 2019, January 2021, April 2022
