= Paul Heckingbottom =

English footballer and manager (born 1977)

Personal information
- Full name: Paul Heckingbottom
- Date of birth: 17 July 1977 (age 49)
- Place of birth: Barnsley, England
- Height: 5 ft 11 in (1.80 m)
- Position: Defender

Youth career
- 1993–1995: Manchester United

Senior career*
Years	Team	Apps	(Gls)
1995–1999	Sunderland	0	(0)
1997–1998	→ Scarborough (loan)	29	(0)
1998–1999	→ Hartlepool United (loan)	5	(1)
1999	→ Darlington (loan)	10	(0)
1999–2002	Darlington	105	(5)
2002–2003	Norwich City	15	(0)
2003–2004	Bradford City	43	(0)
2004–2006	Sheffield Wednesday	42	(4)
2006–2008	Barnsley	49	(1)
2007–2008	→ Bradford City (loan)	23	(0)
2008–2009	Bradford City	30	(0)
2009–2010	Mansfield Town	11	(1)
2010	→ Gateshead (loan)	15	(0)
2010–2011	Gateshead	21	(0)
2011–2012	Harrogate Town	21	(0)
Total		419	(12)

Managerial career
- 2015: Barnsley (caretaker)
- 2016–2018: Barnsley
- 2018: Leeds United
- 2019: Hibernian
- 2021: Sheffield United
- 2021–2023: Sheffield United
- 2024–2026: Preston North End
- * Club domestic league appearances and goals

Paul Heckingbottom (born 17 July 1977) is an English football coach and former player who was most recently the manager of EFL Championship club Preston North End.

After retiring as a player, Heckingbottom trained as a coach. He obtained a position with Barnsley's development squad and, after a successful spell as caretaker manager in which the club won promotion and the EFL Trophy, he was appointed manager in 2016. In February 2018 he moved to Leeds United, but was dismissed during the 2018 close season after 16 games in charge. Heckingbottom then managed Scottish Premiership club Hibernian, but was dismissed in November 2019.

In March 2021, he was appointed interim manager of Sheffield United until the end of the season. After briefly returning to the U23s, he was appointed permanent manager of the club in November 2021, following the dismissal of Slaviša Jokanović. After guiding Sheffield United to promotion from the Championship as runners-up in the 2022–23 season, Heckingbottom was dismissed in December 2023 with the club bottom of the Premier League. In August 2024, he was appointed as manager of EFL Championship club Preston North End.

== Career ==
=== Early career ===
Heckingbottom was born in Barnsley and grew up in nearby Royston. As a child, he was a season-ticket holder at the town's football club, along with his grandfather. He started his football career at Manchester United as a trainee, but joined Sunderland in 1995 after failing to gain a professional contract. He had loan spells at Scarborough, Hartlepool United and Darlington, without featuring for Sunderland, before joining Darlington permanently in 1999. He made 126 appearances, scoring 6 goals, before catching the attention of First Division side Norwich City, who signed him in 2002 on a three-year contract.

Heckingbottom made just 16 appearances for Norwich, including only 7 starts, resulting in him cancelling his contract with the club by mutual consent after just one year. He subsequently signed for Bradford City in July 2003, and was named their Player of the Year at the end of his first season. Bradford, however, were relegated to League One at the end of the 2003–04 season, and Heckingbottom left to join League One club Sheffield Wednesday during the close season.

=== Sheffield Wednesday ===
Heckingbottom was well favoured under both Wednesday managers Chris Turner and Paul Sturrock, making a total of 41 appearances at left back in his first season – more than any other player that year. He also scored four goals, helping the Owls to promotion to the Championship via the play-off final at the end of the 2004–05 season. Due to an injury sustained in pre-season he was put out of contention for the first 16 games of the 2005–06 season. When he returned to fitness, new signing John Hills had begun to make the left back spot his own. An injury to Hills left Heckingbottom able to re-stake his claim on the team, but he only managed a 4-game streak before once again succumbing to injury, this time Peter Gilbert taking his place in the squad. Sturrock allowed Heckingbottom a chance to prove himself in an FA Cup Third Round game against Charlton Athletic. He scored both of Wednesday's goals in the 4–2 defeat at Hillsborough, though this was not enough to establish himself as the club's first-choice left back.

=== Barnsley ===
On 13 January 2006, Heckingbottom was sent on loan, with a view to a permanent move, to his boyhood club Barnsley. He played an important part in the club's promotion campaign and win over Swansea City in the League One play-off final, scoring in the 4–3 penalty shootout victory that secured their promotion to the Championship. Heckingbottom played in 31 games for Barnsley the next season, as they comfortably avoided relegation. He scored once during his spell at Barnsley, in a 1–0 win over Tranmere Rovers on 18 February 2006.

=== Bradford City ===
In July 2007, Heckingbottom returned to Bradford City on loan until 1 January 2008. He played in all 23 league games during his loan spell, missing only an FA Cup tie against Tranmere Rovers through suspension following a red card in a 1–1 draw with Stockport County. A week after his loan deal expired, his contract at Barnsley was cancelled by mutual consent and he signed a permanent 18-month deal at Bradford City. He missed his first league game of the 2007–08 season with four games left, when an ankle injury prevented him from playing against Brentford on 12 April 2008. Heckingbottom's place was taken by Luke O'Brien, who made his Bradford debut in a 2–2 draw.

He played in the club's first nine league games of the 2008–09 season, but was sent off in a 1–1 draw with Luton Town for two bookable offences. His place was again taken by youngster O'Brien, and although Heckingbottom returned for an FA Cup game against Milton Keynes Dons, he suffered tendonitis which kept him out for five months. Bradford opted against offering Heckingbottom a contract extension, and he left the club in May 2009.

=== Non-league career ===
Heckingbottom signed for Conference National club Mansfield Town on 2 June 2009, marking his first foray into the game outside the Football League. He sustained a hamstring injury in pre-season and did not play until October, in a 1–0 win over Forest Green Rovers, 11 months from when he last played a game of football. He became a regular in the Mansfield line-up. He scored his first and only Mansfield goal against Crawley Town on 14 November 2009. On 1 February 2010, Heckingbottom joined Gateshead on loan until the end of the season. making his debut on 13 February away at Hayes & Yeading United.

Heckingbottom signed for Gateshead on a permanent basis on 26 May 2010. He made 23 appearances in all competitions during the 2010–11 season before he was released on 4 May 2011.

He spent the 2011–12 season with Harrogate Town, making 21 appearances in the Conference North without scoring.

== Managerial career ==
=== Barnsley ===
Heckingbottom took the opportunity to gain an academic understanding of football coaching, to set his CV apart from other managers competing for jobs. He completed his BSc (Hons) Sports Coaching at Leeds Metropolitan University in 2013, followed by an MSc in Sport Coaching in 2016, by which point the university had been renamed Leeds Beckett University.

He went on to work as a coach with professional club Barnsley's development squad, and was appointed caretaker manager of the first team after Danny Wilson was sacked in 2015. He was not appointed on a permanent basis in favour of Lee Johnson, though was appointed in the caretaker manager role once again the following year after Johnson left to manage Bristol City. During the latter spell, he guided Barnsley to a 3–2 win against Oxford United in the Football League Trophy final and promotion to the Championship by beating Millwall 3–1 in the League One play-off final. His success as caretaker, leading Barnsley to their first cup final victory since 1912 and promotion to the Championship, led to his being appointed head coach on a permanent basis.

The good form and results continued for the first half of the 2016–17 Championship season, as the club ended 2016 in ninth position. Heckingbottom was awarded Sports Hero of the Year by The Yorkshire Post. Heckingbottom signed a new rolling contract at Barnsley on 2 February 2018, but he left the club days later to take a similar position with Leeds United.

=== Leeds United ===
On 6 February 2018, Heckingbottom was announced as the new head coach of Leeds United on an 18-month contract. In his first match as head coach, Leeds lost 2–1 to Sheffield United, and finished 13th in the 2017–18 EFL Championship league table. Heckingbottom selected youngster Bailey Peacock-Farrell as first-choice goalkeeper and also gave debuts to academy players Tom Pearce, Paudie O'Connor, Hugo Díaz and Ryan Edmondson. Heckingbottom integrated further academy players with the first team during a controversial post-season tour of Myanmar. Heckingbottom was dismissed by Leeds on 1 June 2018, after just four months with the club, and was succeeded by Marcelo Bielsa.

=== Hibernian ===
Heckingbottom was appointed head coach of Scottish Premiership club Hibernian on 13 February 2019. The club went on an unbeaten league run, and Heckingbottom won the Premiership Manager of the Month award for March 2019. Two days later, Heckingbottom won his first Edinburgh derby match as Hibs manager against Hearts at Tynecastle. Hibs finished in fifth position, but Heckingbottom was unhappy that the team "downed tools" in the last few matches of the season.

Hibs won only one of their first eleven league matches in the 2019–20 season. Heckingbottom was dismissed on 4 November following a 5–2 defeat by Celtic in a League Cup semi-final, with the team sitting in 10th place in the league.

=== Sheffield United ===
Heckingbottom was appointed as under-23s lead coach at Sheffield United in July 2020. After first-team manager Chris Wilder left the club by mutual consent in March 2021, with the team bottom of the Premier League and 12 points adrift of safety, Heckingbottom took charge on a deal until the end of the season. United lost 5–0 to Leicester City in his first match in charge, and relegation to the Championship was confirmed after four more defeats. Sheffield United won three of their last six matches, and Heckingbottom was reportedly shortlisted for the permanent position, but former Fulham manager Slaviša Jokanović was appointed instead, with Heckingbottom returning to his previous role as the under-23s manager at the club.

On 25 November 2021, Heckingbottom was appointed manager of Sheffield United for a second spell, this time on a permanent basis, on a four-and-a-half-year deal following the dismissal of Jokanović. In his first game in charge, the Blades beat Bristol City 2–0. The team ended the season in fifth place, subsequently qualifying for the promotion playoffs, though they lost to Nottingham Forest in the semi-finals.

An impressive start to the 2022–23 season saw Heckingbottom awarded the EFL Championship Manager of the Month award for August 2022 after picking up 14 points from a possible 21. Three wins from three away matches saw Heckingbottom claim the award for a second consecutive month.

On 26 April 2023, Sheffield United confirmed their promotion back to the Premier League with a 2–0 home victory over West Bromwich Albion. Following their promotion, he was awarded the Championship Manager of the Month award for April, his third time winning the award across the season.

On 2 December 2023, Sheffield United suffered a 5–0 loss away at relegation rivals Burnley, leading Sheffield United to dismiss Heckingbottom and replace him with Chris Wilder two days later.

=== Preston North End ===
On 20 August 2024, Heckingbottom was appointed as manager of Preston North End following the departure of Ryan Lowe after just one game of the 2024–25 season. On 13 September 2026, Paul Heckingbottom was sacked by Preston North End after two years in charge, with the club 23rd in the Championship.

== Career statistics ==
Appearances and goals by club, season and competition
Club	Season	League			FA Cup		League Cup		Other		Total	
Club	Season	Division	Apps	Goals	Apps	Goals	Apps	Goals	Apps	Goals	Apps	Goals
Sunderland	1996–97	FA Premier League	0	0	0	0	0	0	—		0	0
Sunderland	1997–98	First Division	0	0	—		0	0	—		0	0
Sunderland	1998–99	First Division	0	0	0	0	0	0	—		0	0
Sunderland	Total		0	0	0	0	0	0	—		0	0
Scarborough (loan)	1997–98	Third Division	29	0	0	0	—		1 (Note: Appearance(s) in Football League Trophy)	0	30	0
Hartlepool United (loan)	1998–99	Third Division	5	1	—		—		—		5	1
Darlington (loan)	1998–99	Third Division	10	0	—		—		—		10	0
Darlington	1999–2000	Third Division	45	1	3	1	2	0	4 (Note: One appearance in Football League Trophy, three in Football League Third Division play-offs)	0	54	2
Darlington	2000–01	Second Division	18	1	1	0	2	0	2	0	23	1
Darlington	2001–02	Third Division	42	3	4	0	0	0	2	0	48	3
Darlington	Total		115	5	8	1	4	0	8	0	135	6
Norwich City	2002–03	First Division	15	0	0	0	1	0	—		16	0
Bradford City	2003–04	First Division	43	0	1	0	1	0	—		45	0
Sheffield Wednesday	2004–05	League One	38	4	0	0	1	0	3 (Note: Appearances in League One play-offs)	0	42	4
Sheffield Wednesday	2005–06	Championship	4	0	1	2	0	0	—		5	2
Sheffield Wednesday	Total		42	4	1	2	1	0	3	0	47	6
Barnsley	2005–06	League One	18	1	—		—		3	0	21	1
Barnsley	2006–07	Championship	31	0	1	0	0	0	—		32	0
Barnsley	2007–08	Championship	—		—		—		—		—	
Barnsley	Total		49	1	1	0	0	0	3	0	53	1
Bradford City	2007–08	League Two	44	0	1	0	1	0	1	0	47	0
Bradford City	2008–09	League Two	9	0	1	0	1	0	1	0	12	0
Bradford City	Total		53	0	2	0	2	0	2	0	59	0
Mansfield Town	2009–10	Conference Premier	11	1	3	0	—		1 (Note: Appearance in FA Trophy)	0	15	1
Gateshead (loan)	2009–10	Conference Premier	15	0	—		—		—		15	0
Gateshead	2010–11	Conference Premier	21	0	0	0	—		1	0	22	0
Gateshead	Total		36	0	0	0	—		1	0	37	0
Career total			398	12	16	3	9	0	19	0	442	15

== Managerial statistics ==
As of match played 12 September 2026

Managerial record by team and tenure
Team	From	To	Record					Ref.
Team	From	To	P	W	D	L	Win %	Ref.
Barnsley (caretaker)	12 February 2015	25 February 2015	3	2	0	1	66.7	
Barnsley	6 February 2016	6 February 2018	105	37	28	40	35.2	
Leeds United	6 February 2018	1 June 2018	16	4	4	8	25.0	
Hibernian	13 February 2019	4 November 2019	32	11	12	9	34.4	
Sheffield United	13 March 2021	27 May 2021	11	3	0	8	27.3	
Sheffield United	25 November 2021	5 December 2023	98	49	18	31	50.0	
Preston North End	20 August 2024	13 September 2026	109	30	38	41	27.5	
Total			374	136	100	138	36.4	

== Honours ==
=== Player ===
Sheffield Wednesday

- Football League One play-offs: 2005

Barnsley

- Football League One play-offs: 2006

=== Manager ===
Barnsley

- Football League One play-offs: 2016
- Football League Trophy: 2015–16

Sheffield United

- EFL Championship second-place promotion: 2022–23

Individual

- Football League One Manager of the Month: March 2016
- EFL Championship Manager of the Month: August 2022, September 2022, April 2023
