= 2026–27 EFL Championship =

English football tournament

EFL Championship
- Season: 2026–27
- Dates: 14 August 2026 – 1 May 2027
- Matches: 192
- Goals: 561 (2.92 per match)
- Top goalscorer: Will Lankshear (Middlesbrough) (13 goals)
- Biggest home win: West Ham United; 6–0 Wrexham (11 September 2026)
- Biggest away win: Lincoln City 0–6; West Ham United (14 October 2026)
- Highest scoring: Cardiff City 5–4; Burnley (7 November 2026)
- Longest winning run: Norwich City (5 games)
- Longest unbeaten run: Middlesbrough (11 games)
- Longest winless run: Charlton Athletic (11 games)
- Longest losing run: Norwich City (5 games)
- Highest attendance: 62,264; West Ham United; 1–2 Charlton Athletic (22 August 2026)
- Lowest attendance: 10,165; Lincoln City 0–1; Wrexham (21 November 2026)
- Total attendance: 4,433,370
- Average attendance: 23,090
- All statistics correct as of 22 November 2026.

The 2026–27 EFL Championship (referred to as the Sky Bet Championship for sponsorship purposes) is the 11th season of the EFL Championship under its current title and the 35th season under its current league division format. This is the first season following the expansion of the post season play-offs from four teams to six.

The 2026–27 season consists of 46 matchdays in total, with the fixture list released on 25 June 2026 at 12:00 BST. The opening round of the league commenced between 14–17 August 2026.

== Team changes ==
The following teams changed division since the 2025–26 season:

=== To Championship ===
Promoted from League One

- Lincoln City
- Cardiff City
- Bolton Wanderers

Relegated from the Premier League

- West Ham United
- Burnley
- Wolverhampton Wanderers

=== From Championship ===
Promoted to the Premier League

- Coventry City
- Ipswich Town
- Hull City

Relegated to League One

- Oxford United
- Leicester City
- Sheffield Wednesday

== Stadiums and locations ==
Team	Location	Stadium	Capacity
Birmingham City	Birmingham (Bordesley)	St Andrew's	29,409
Blackburn Rovers	Blackburn	Ewood Park	31,367
Bolton Wanderers	Horwich	Toughsheet Community Stadium	28,723
Bristol City	Bristol	Ashton Gate	26,462
Burnley	Burnley	Turf Moor	21,990
Cardiff City	Cardiff	Cardiff City Stadium	33,280
Charlton Athletic	London (Charlton)	The Valley	27,111
Derby County	Derby	Pride Park Stadium	33,597
Lincoln City	Lincoln	Sincil Bank	11,400
Middlesbrough	Middlesbrough	Riverside Stadium	34,742
Millwall	London (Bermondsey)	The Den	20,146
Norwich City	Norwich	Carrow Road	27,359
Portsmouth	Portsmouth	Fratton Park	20,867
Preston North End	Preston	Deepdale	23,408
Queens Park Rangers	London (Shepherd's Bush)	Loftus Road	18,439
Sheffield United	Sheffield (Highfield)	Bramall Lane	32,050
Southampton	Southampton	St Mary's Stadium	32,384
Stoke City	Stoke-on-Trent	bet365 Stadium	30,089
Swansea City	Swansea	Swansea.com Stadium	21,088
Watford	Watford	Vicarage Road	22,200
West Bromwich Albion	West Bromwich	The Hawthorns	26,850
West Ham United	London (Stratford)	London Stadium	62,500
Wolverhampton Wanderers	Wolverhampton	Molineux Stadium	31,750
Wrexham	Wrexham	Racecourse Ground	10,771

Locations of the 2026–27 EFL Championship teams
Lancashire EFL Championship football clubs
Greater London EFL Championship football clubs

== Personnel and sponsoring ==
Team	Manager(s)	Captain	Kit manufacturer	Shirt sponsor(s)	
Team	Manager(s)	Captain	Kit manufacturer	Main	Other(s)
Birmingham City	(Wales) Chris Davies	(Austria) Christoph Klarer	Nike	Coral	List: Back: Visit Birmingham, Alabama; Sleeve: None; Shorts: SheMed
Blackburn Rovers	(England) Mike Dodds & (Northern Ireland) Damien Johnson (interim)	(England) Todd Cantwell	Umbro	Watson Ramsbottom Solicitors	List: Back: Suits Me; Sleeve: Venky's; Shorts: Venky's
Bolton Wanderers	(England) Steven Schumacher	(Northern Ireland) Eoin Toal	Macron	Victorian Plumbing	List: Back: Ebuyer; Sleeve: Whites Beaconsfield; Shorts: Destinology
Bristol City	(England) Michael Skubala	(Republic of Ireland) Jason Knight	O'Neills	Victorian Plumbing	List: Back: GoSkippy; Sleeve: Exacta Technologies; Shorts: Digital NRG
Burnley	(Switzerland) Fabio Celestini	(Republic of Ireland) Josh Cullen	Castore	Vertu Motors^{1}	List: Back: Trainline; Sleeve: None; Shorts: None
Cardiff City	(Republic of Ireland) Brian Barry-Murphy	(England) Calum Chambers	Castore	Visit Malaysia	List: Back: DragonBet; Sleeve: Affluent Time; Shorts: Nyne Capital
Charlton Athletic	(Wales) Nathan Jones	(England) Lloyd Jones	Reebok	RSK Group	List: Back: University of Greenwich; Sleeve: Christopher Ward; Shorts: None
Derby County	(England) John Eustace	(England) Lewis Travis	Puma	Loaded	List: Back: HSG UK; Sleeve: Tonic Weight Loss Surgery; Shorts: HSG UK
Lincoln City	(England) Chris Cohen & (England) Tom Shaw	(Zimbabwe) Tendayi Darikwa	Oxen	Home: Branston; Away: Nana Tate	List: Back: Gen2 Energy; Sleeve Home: Easy Heat Pumps; Sleeve Away: Logicool; Shorts Home: None; Shorts Away: IFI Group
Middlesbrough	(Sweden) Kim Hellberg	(England) Luke Ayling	Castore	Midnite	List: Back: Perco Foods; Sleeve: Telcoss; Shorts: NOCO
Millwall	(Scotland) Alex Neil	(England) Jake Cooper	Erreà	Wiggett Group	List: Back: Wiggett Group; Sleeve: FXD Capital; Shorts: None
Norwich City	(Belgium) Philippe Clement	(Scotland) Kenny McLean	Joma	Blakely Clothing	List: Back: Green Light Consultancy Group; Sleeve: Willy's Pies; Shorts: BetWright
Portsmouth	(England) John Mousinho	(England) Marlon Pack	Nike	University of Portsmouth	List: Back: Aura.com (H) / TotalAV (A); Sleeve: BeeBu; Shorts: MG Richmond
Preston North End	(Scotland) Graham Alexander	(Northern Ireland) Ali McCann	Castore	SpudBros	List: Back: Pub Casino; Sleeve: CPC; Shorts: Dr. Oetker
Queens Park Rangers	(France) Julien Stéphan	(Republic of Ireland) Jimmy Dunne	Erreà	MrQ	List: Back: Xtra Maintenance; Sleeve: Cubefunder; Shorts: MyGuava Business
Sheffield United	(England) Chris Wilder	(England) Japhet Tanganga	Adidas	Midnite	List: Back: None; Sleeve: Village Hotel Club; Shorts: NOCO
Southampton	(Germany) Tonda Eckert	(England) Jack Stephens	Puma	P&O Cruises	List: Back: Midnite; Sleeve: Garmin; Shorts: Midnite
Stoke City	(England) Mark Robins	(Sweden) Viktor Johansson	Macron	bet365	List: Back: None; Sleeve: Stoke City Foundation; Shorts: None
Swansea City	(Wales) Ashley Williams, (England) Leon Britton, (Wales) Joe Allen, (Wales) Kristian O'Leary (interim)	(Wales) Ben Cabango	Joma	AG1	List: Back: Swansea Building Society; Sleeve: ASI:One by Fetch
Watford	TBC	(England) Mattie Pollock	Kelme	BOXT	List: Back: Koka; Sleeve: University of Hertfordshire; Shorts: Asus
West Bromwich Albion	(Scotland) James Morrison	(United States) George Campbell	Macron	Ideal Heating	List: Back: Mega Riches; Sleeve: BarberBoss; Shorts: None
West Ham United	(England) Scott Parker	(England) Jarrod Bowen	New Balance	BoyleSports	List: Back: Athletes Elevated; Sleeve: Lilley Plummer Risks; Shorts:
Wolverhampton Wanderers	(Portugal) César Peixoto	(Portugal) Toti Gomes	Sudu	Midnite	List: Back: None; Sleeve: Wolf Competitions; Shorts: None
Wrexham	(England) Phil Parkinson	(Scotland) Dominic Hyam	Macron	Firefox	List: Back: Royal Bank of Canada; Sleeve: Nex Playground; Shorts: None

1. Burnley's shirt sponsor was Finotive One until 14 August 2026 when the deal was ended prematurely.

== Managerial changes ==
Team	Outgoing manager	Manner of departure	Date of vacancy	Position in the table	Incoming manager(s)	Date of appointment
Blackburn Rovers	(Northern Ireland) Michael O'Neill	End of contract	2 May 2026	Pre-season	(England) Tony Mowbray	5 June 2026
Bristol City	(England) Roy Hodgson	End of interim spell	2 May 2026	Pre-season	(England) Michael Skubala	29 May 2026
Watford	(England) Edward Still	Sacked	3 May 2026	Pre-season	(Italy) Alessio Dionisi	15 June 2026
Burnley	(England) Mike Jackson	End of interim spell	24 May 2026	Pre-season	(Belgium) Nicky Hayen	10 July 2026
Lincoln City	(England) Michael Skubala	Signed by Bristol City	29 May 2026	Pre-season	(England) Chris Cohen & (England) Tom Shaw	29 May 2026
Wolverhampton Wanderers	(Wales) Rob Edwards	Sacked	11 June 2026	Pre-season	(Portugal) César Peixoto	15 June 2026
Preston North End	(England) Paul Heckingbottom	Sacked	13 September 2026	23rd	(Scotland) Graham Alexander	28 September 2026
Burnley	(Belgium) Nicky Hayen	Sacked	24 October 2026	22nd	(Switzerland) Fabio Celestini	28 October 2026
West Ham United	(Portugal) Nuno Espírito Santo	Sacked	3 November 2026	8th	(England) Scott Parker	4 November 2026
Blackburn Rovers	(England) Tony Mowbray	Resigned	17 November 2026	13th	(England) Mike Dodds & (Northern Ireland) Damien Johnson (interim)	17 November 2026
Swansea City	(Portugal) Vítor Matos	Signed by Strasbourg	18 November 2026	6th	(Wales) Ashley Williams, (England) Leon Britton, (Wales) Joe Allen & (Wales) Kristian O'Leary (interim)	19 November 2026
Watford	(Italy) Alessio Dionisi	Sacked	22 November 2026	21st		

== League table ==
Pos	Team	Pld	W	D	L	GF	GA	GD	Pts	Promotion, qualification or relegation
1	Middlesbrough	16	9	5	2	32	19	+13	32	Promotion to the Premier League
2	Stoke City	16	10	2	4	25	18	+7	32	Promotion to the Premier League
3	Wolverhampton Wanderers	16	9	4	3	28	19	+9	31	Qualification for Championship play-off semi-finals
4	Birmingham City	16	8	5	3	28	15	+13	29	Qualification for Championship play-off semi-finals
5	West Bromwich Albion	16	8	5	3	25	17	+8	29	Qualification for Championship play-off quarter-finals
6	Southampton	16	9	4	3	31	15	+16	27 (Note: Southampton were deducted four points due to multiple breaches of EFL regulations related to the unauthorised filming of other clubs' training.)	Qualification for Championship play-off quarter-finals
7	Queens Park Rangers	16	7	6	3	25	18	+7	27	Qualification for Championship play-off quarter-finals
8	Swansea City	16	8	3	5	24	20	+4	27	Qualification for Championship play-off quarter-finals
9	Sheffield United	16	7	4	5	25	19	+6	25	
10	West Ham United	16	6	6	4	38	24	+14	24	
11	Norwich City	16	8	0	8	34	25	+9	24	
12	Portsmouth	16	6	5	5	21	19	+2	23	
13	Blackburn Rovers	16	6	4	6	24	25	−1	22	
14	Wrexham	16	5	6	5	19	20	−1	21	
15	Cardiff City	16	4	6	6	28	29	−1	18	
16	Millwall	16	5	3	8	23	28	−5	18	
17	Bolton Wanderers	16	5	3	8	21	30	−9	18	
18	Bristol City	16	5	3	8	16	26	−10	18	
19	Charlton Athletic	16	4	5	7	14	25	−11	17	
20	Lincoln City	16	4	3	9	15	27	−12	15	
21	Watford	16	4	3	9	13	27	−14	15	
22	Burnley	16	1	8	7	24	33	−9	11	Relegation to EFL League One
23	Derby County	16	2	4	10	14	32	−18	10	Relegation to EFL League One
24	Preston North End	16	2	3	11	14	31	−17	9	Relegation to EFL League One

Updated to match(es) played on 22 November 2026. Source: EFL Official Website
Rules for classification: 1) Points; 2) Goal difference; 3) Number of goals scored; 4) Head-to-head results; 5) Wins; 6) Away goals; 7) Penalty points (sec 9.5); 8) Number of 12-point sending off offences; 9) Play-off (only if needed to determine promotion/relegation)

== Results ==
Home \ Away	BIR	BLB	BOL	BRI	BUR	CAR	CHA	DER	LIN	MID	MIL	NOR	POR	PNE	QPR	SHU	SOU	STO	SWA	WAT	WBA	WHU	WOL	WRX
Birmingham City	—			2–2						2–2	3–0			4–0	3–0		1–1		2–1				2–2	
Blackburn Rovers		—			a	2–1				2–1	3–1				1–2	1–2		1–2				2–1		2–0
Bolton Wanderers			—	2–3		1–0			0–1	1–5			1–1	2–1				1–2				2–3		
Bristol City		0–1		—		a			0–1		0–2	0–5	2–1			0–1				1–0			1–2	
Burnley		2–2		1–2	—		2–2	1–1		1–1			0–0									2–2	1–2	
Cardiff City	1–0			a	5–4	—	3–1									2–2		1–1	a	5–1		3–3		1–1
Charlton Athletic			0–1	1–1			—	2–1			a	1–3	0–0	1–0	0–0	2–1						a		
Derby County	1–2		3–1			2–2		—				0–4						0–1	0–3		0–1			1–1
Lincoln City	1–3	0–0			4–1				—				1–3				1–1		1–2			0–6		0–1
Middlesbrough				2–0		2–2	3–0		2–1	—	2–2	4–3									3–1		1–0	
Millwall			4–0				a	4–1	2–2		—	3–0			0–1				0–1			2–2		0–3
Norwich City	2–1		3–4		4–1	2–1						—	0–1				0–1			3–2	1–2			
Portsmouth		2–2				2–0		0–2			2–1		—		1–3	3–2	a	1–2	3–1					
Preston North End		2–1		1–3					0–1		0–1			—		2–3	1–0				1–1		1–3	
Queens Park Rangers			0–0		1–1	2–1	a	4–1	2–1	0–1	a			2–2	—				5–0			a		
Sheffield United	0–0		3–2					1–1	3–0			1–3				—				4–0			0–1	1–0
Southampton			0–0	4–1				2–0			5–1		1–0		4–1		—	3–1	3–1					
Stoke City	1–0			0–0			4–0			2–3		1–0		2–0		2–1		—	1–2					
Swansea City		4–0			3–1	a						2–1				0–0			—	2–0	2–2	0–1		0–0
Watford					0–4		2–0		1–0	0–0				2–1			2–1	1–2		—		1–1		
West Bromwich Albion	0–1	3–2			3–1		1–1				3–0				1–1		1–1			1–0	—		a	
West Ham United							1–2	3–0			a			1–1	1–1		2–3				1–3	—	4–2	6–0
Wolverhampton Wanderers		2–2	1–3			3–0	2–1						1–1					4–1		1–0	1–0		—	
Wrexham	1–2				1–1					2–0				4–1			2–1			1–1	1–2		1–1	—

Updated to match(es) played on 22 November 2026. Source: efl.com
Legend: Blue = home team win; Yellow = draw; Red = away team win.
For upcoming matches, an "a" indicates there is an article about the rivalry between the two participants.

== Play-offs ==
=== Bracket ===
Eliminators
5	TBC
8	TBC
6	TBC
7	TBC

Semi-finals
3
Lowest-seeded eliminators winner
4
Highest-seeded eliminators winner

Final

== Season statistics ==
As of 22 November 2026

=== Top scorers ===
Rank	Player	Club	Goals
1	(England) Will Lankshear	Middlesbrough	13
2	(Iceland) Andri Guðjohnsen	Blackburn Rovers	11
3	(Republic of Ireland) Jack Moylan	Cardiff City	10
4	(Canada) Cyle Larin	Southampton	8
5	(England) Jarrod Bowen	West Ham United	7
5	(England) Sam Dalby	Bolton Wanderers	7
5	(Northern Ireland) Isaac Price	West Bromwich Albion	7
8	(Spain) Fer López	Wolverhampton Wanderers	6
8	(Greece) Konstantinos Mavropanos	West Ham United	6
8	(Denmark) August Priske	Birmingham City	6
8	(Denmark) Yousef Salech	Cardiff City	6

=== Hat-tricks ===
Player	For	Against	Result	Date
(Ivory Coast) Richard Kone	Queens Park Rangers	Swansea City	5–0 (H)	24 October 2026
(England) Sydie Peck	Sheffield United	Preston North End	3–2 (A)	3 November 2026
(Republic of Ireland) Jack Moylan	Cardiff City	West Ham United	3–3 (H)	4 November 2026

=== Clean sheets ===
Rank	Player	Club	Clean sheets
1	(England) Michael Cooper	Sheffield United	6
1	(Sweden) Viktor Johansson	Stoke City	6
1	(Chile) Lawrence Vigouroux	Swansea City	6
4	(Czech Republic) Radek Vítek	Middlesbrough	5
5	(England) James Beadle	Birmingham City	4
5	(Northern Ireland) Pierce Charles	Queens Park Rangers	4
5	(Denmark) Mads Hermansen	West Ham United	4
5	(England) Anthony Patterson	Wrexham	4
5	(Israel) Daniel Peretz	Southampton	4
5	(Portugal) José Sá	Wolverhampton Wanderers	4
5	(England) George Wickens	Lincoln City	4

=== Discipline ===
==== Player ====
- Most yellow cards: 6
  - (Northern Ireland) Ethan Galbraith (Stoke City)
  - (Republic of Ireland) Liam Kitching (Sheffield United)
  - (Czech Republic) Filip Lissah (Swansea City)
- Most red cards: 1
  - Twenty-four players

==== Club ====
- Most yellow cards: 47
  - Watford
- Most red cards: 3
  - Lincoln City
  - Stoke City
- Fewest yellow cards: 19
  - Bristol City
  - Middlesbrough
- Fewest red cards: 0
  - Birmingham City
  - Middlesbrough
  - Portsmouth
  - Watford
  - Wolverhampton Wanderers
  - Wrexham

== Awards ==
=== Monthly ===
Month	Manager of the Month		Player of the Month		Ref
August	(Portugal) Vítor Matos	Swansea City	(Canada) Cyle Larin	Southampton	
September	(Portugal) Nuno Espírito Santo	West Ham United	(Greece) Konstantinos Mavropanos	West Ham United	
October	(Sweden) Kim Hellberg	Middlesbrough	(England) Will Lankshear	Middlesbrough	
November					
December					
January					
February					
March					
April					
