= 2025–26 EFL Championship =

English football tournament

EFL Championship
- Season: 2025–26
- Dates: 8 August 2025 – 2 May 2026
- Champions: Coventry City; 1st Championship title Second 2nd tier title
- Promoted: Coventry City; Ipswich Town; Hull City
- Relegated: Oxford United; Leicester City; Sheffield Wednesday
- Matches: 552
- Goals: 1,438 (2.61 per match)
- Best player: Hayden Hackney (Middlesbrough) (Player of the Season)
- Top goalscorer: Žan Vipotnik (Swansea City) (23 goals)
- Best goalkeeper: Carl Rushworth (Coventry City) (17 clean sheets)
- Biggest home win: Coventry City 7–1; Queens Park Rangers (23 August 2025)
- Biggest away win: Sheffield Wednesday; 0–5 Coventry City (4 October 2025); West Bromwich Albion; 0–5 Norwich City (20 January 2026); Bristol City 0–5; Derby County (30 January 2026)
- Highest scoring: Derby County 3–5; Coventry City (16 August 2025); Coventry City 7–1; Queens Park Rangers (23 August 2025); Wrexham 5–3; Sheffield United (26 December 2025); Wrexham 5–3; Ipswich Town (21 February 2026)
- Longest winning run: Southampton (7 games)
- Longest unbeaten run: Southampton (21 games) (Note: 21 games unbeaten includes 19 league games and 2 play-off matches.)
- Longest winless run: Sheffield Wednesday (39 games)
- Longest losing run: Sheffield Wednesday (13 games)
- Highest attendance: 34,988; Middlesbrough 1–1; Bristol City (14 March 2026)
- Lowest attendance: 7,081; Sheffield Wednesday; 0–1 Middlesbrough (22 October 2025)
- Total attendance: 12,208,071
- Average attendance: 22,116

The 2025–26 EFL Championship (referred to as the Sky Bet Championship for sponsorship purposes) was the 10th season of the EFL Championship under its current title and the 34th season under its current league division format.

The 2025–26 season consisted of 33 weekend rounds, 9 midweek rounds and 4 bank holiday rounds.

== Team changes ==
The following teams changed division since the 2024–25 season:

=== To Championship ===
Promoted from League One

- Birmingham City
- Wrexham
- Charlton Athletic

Relegated from the Premier League

- Leicester City
- Ipswich Town
- Southampton

=== From Championship ===
Promoted to the Premier League

- Leeds United
- Burnley
- Sunderland

Relegated to League One

- Luton Town
- Plymouth Argyle
- Cardiff City

== Stadiums and locations ==
Note: Table lists in alphabetical order.

Team	Location	Stadium	Capacity
Birmingham City	Birmingham (Bordesley)	St Andrew's	29,409
Blackburn Rovers	Blackburn	Ewood Park	31,367
Bristol City	Bristol	Ashton Gate	26,462
Charlton Athletic	London (Charlton)	The Valley	27,111
Coventry City	Coventry	Coventry Building Society Arena	32,609
Derby County	Derby	Pride Park	32,926
Hull City	Kingston upon Hull	MKM Stadium	25,586
Ipswich Town	Ipswich	Portman Road	30,056
Leicester City	Leicester	King Power Stadium	32,259
Middlesbrough	Middlesbrough	Riverside Stadium	34,742
Millwall	London (Bermondsey)	The Den	20,146
Norwich City	Norwich	Carrow Road	27,359
Oxford United	Oxford	Kassam Stadium	12,500
Portsmouth	Portsmouth	Fratton Park	20,867
Preston North End	Preston	Deepdale	23,408
Queens Park Rangers	London (Shepherd's Bush)	Loftus Road	18,439
Sheffield United	Sheffield (Highfield)	Bramall Lane	32,050
Sheffield Wednesday	Sheffield (Hillsborough)	Hillsborough Stadium	39,732
Southampton	Southampton	St Mary's Stadium	32,384
Stoke City	Stoke-on-Trent	bet365 Stadium	30,089
Swansea City	Swansea	Swansea.com Stadium	21,088
Watford	Watford	Vicarage Road	22,200
West Bromwich Albion	West Bromwich	The Hawthorns	26,850
Wrexham	Wrexham	Racecourse Ground	10,669

For the 2025–26 season, the combined stadium capacity of the 24 clubs was 640,410, with an average of 26,684.

Locations of the 2025–26 EFL Championship teams
Greater London EFL Championship football clubs

== Personnel and sponsoring ==
Team	Manager	Captain	Kit manufacturer	Shirt sponsor(s)	
Team	Manager	Captain	Kit manufacturer	Main	Other(s)
Birmingham City	(Wales) Chris Davies	(Austria) Christoph Klarer	Nike	Undefeated	List: Back: Visit Birmingham, Alabama; Sleeve: None; Shorts: SheMed
Blackburn Rovers	(Northern Ireland) Michael O'Neill	(England) Todd Cantwell	Macron	Watson Ramsbottom Solicitors	List: Back: Suits Me; Sleeve: Venky's; Shorts: Venky's
Bristol City	(England) Roy Hodgson (interim)	(Republic of Ireland) Jason Knight	O'Neills	Fever	List: Back: GoSkippy; Sleeve: Exacta Technologies; Shorts: Digital NRG
Charlton Athletic	(Wales) Nathan Jones	(Scotland) Greg Docherty	Reebok	RSK Group	List: Back: University of Greenwich; Sleeve: Christopher Ward; Shorts: None
Coventry City	(England) Frank Lampard	(England) Matt Grimes	Hummel	Monzo	List: Back: Monzo Business; Sleeve: XL Motors; Shorts: None
Derby County	(England) John Eustace	(England) Lewis Travis	Puma	FanHub	List: Back: HSG UK; Sleeve: Tonic Weight Loss Surgery; Shorts: HSG UK
Hull City	(Bosnia and Herzegovina) Sergej Jakirović	(England) Lewie Coyle	Kappa	Corendon Airlines	List: Back: None; Sleeve: Anex Tour; Shorts: None
Ipswich Town	(Northern Ireland) Kieran McKenna	(Republic of Ireland) Dara O'Shea	Umbro	Halo Service Solutions	List: Back: None; Sleeve: Tingley Ted's; Shorts: Fleximize
Leicester City	(England) Gary Rowett	(Portugal) Ricardo Pereira	Adidas	BC.GAME	List: Back: None; Sleeve: Bia Saigon; Shorts: None
Middlesbrough	(Sweden) Kim Hellberg	(England) Dael Fry	Castore	Unibet	List: Back: Perco Foods; Sleeve: Telcoss; Shorts: NOCO
Millwall	(Scotland) Alex Neil	(England) Jake Cooper	Erreà	Wiggett Group^{1}	List: Back: Wiggett Group; Sleeve: FXD Capital; Shorts: None
Norwich City	(Belgium) Philippe Clement	(Scotland) Kenny McLean	Joma	Blakely Clothing	List: Back: Green Light Consultancy Group; Sleeve: Willy's Pies; Shorts: BetWright
Oxford United	(England) Matt Bloomfield	(England) Cameron Brannagan	Macron	Baxi	List: Back: None; Sleeve: Caprinos Pizza; Shorts: None
Portsmouth	(England) John Mousinho	(England) Marlon Pack	Nike	University of Portsmouth	List: Back: Aura.com (H) / TotalAV (A); Sleeve: BeeBu; Shorts: MG Richmond
Preston North End	(England) Paul Heckingbottom	(England) Benjamin Whiteman	Castore	SpudBros	List: Back: Pub Casino; Sleeve: CPC; Shorts: None
Queens Park Rangers	(France) Julien Stéphan	(Republic of Ireland) Jimmy Dunne	Erreà	CopyBet	List: Back: Xtra Maintenance; Sleeve: MyGuava; Shorts: MyGuava Business
Sheffield United	(England) Chris Wilder	(England) Japhet Tanganga	Erreà	Midnite	List: Back: None; Sleeve: Village Hotel Club; Shorts: NOCO
Sheffield Wednesday	(Denmark) Henrik Pedersen	(Scotland) Liam Palmer	Macron	Mr Vegas	List: Back: None; Sleeve: None; Shorts: Sheffield Wednesday Supporters Trust
Southampton	(Germany) Tonda Eckert	(England) Jack Stephens	Puma	P&O Cruises	List: Back: Midnite; Sleeve: Garmin; Shorts: Midnite
Stoke City	(England) Mark Robins	(England) Ben Gibson	Macron	bet365	List: Back: None; Sleeve: None; Shorts: None
Swansea City	(Portugal) Vítor Matos	(Wales) Ben Cabango	Joma	Reviva Coffee	List: Back: Swansea Building Society; Sleeve: Visit Central Florida; Shorts: First Grade Projects
Watford	(England) Edward Still	(Morocco) Imrân Louza	Kelme	MrQ.com	List: Back: Koka; Sleeve: University of Hertfordshire; Shorts: Asus
West Bromwich Albion	(Scotland) James Morrison	(England) Jed Wallace	Macron	Ideal Heating	List: Back: Mega Riches; Sleeve: BarberBoss; Shorts: None
Wrexham	(England) Phil Parkinson	(Scotland) Dominic Hyam	Macron	United Airlines	List: Back: Meta Quest; Sleeve: HP; Shorts: None

1. Millwall's shirt sponsor was MyGuava until 22 December 2025 when the deal was ended prematurely.

== Managerial changes ==
Team	Outgoing manager	Manner of departure	Date of vacancy	Position in the table	Incoming manager	Date of appointment
Norwich City	(England) Jack Wilshere	End of interim spell	3 May 2025	Pre-season	(England) Liam Manning	3 June 2025
West Bromwich Albion	(Scotland) James Morrison	End of interim spell	3 May 2025	Pre-season	(England) Ryan Mason	2 June 2025
Watford	(England) Tom Cleverley	Sacked	6 May 2025	Pre-season	(Uruguayan Football Association) Paulo Pezzolano	13 May 2025
Hull City	(Spain) Rubén Sellés	Sacked	15 May 2025	Pre-season	(Bosnia and Herzegovina) Sergej Jakirović	11 June 2025
Southampton	(England) Simon Rusk	End of interim spell	25 May 2025	Pre-season	(England) Will Still	25 May 2025
Bristol City	(England) Liam Manning	Signed by Norwich City	3 June 2025	Pre-season	(Austria) Gerhard Struber	19 June 2025
Middlesbrough	(England) Michael Carrick	Sacked	4 June 2025	Pre-season	(Wales) Rob Edwards	24 June 2025
Sheffield United	(England) Chris Wilder	Mutual consent	18 June 2025	Pre-season	(Spain) Rubén Sellés	18 June 2025
Queens Park Rangers	(Spain) Martí Cifuentes	Mutual consent	24 June 2025	Pre-season	(France) Julien Stéphan	25 June 2025
Leicester City	(Netherlands) Ruud van Nistelrooy	Mutual consent	27 June 2025	Pre-season	(Spain) Martí Cifuentes	15 July 2025
Sheffield Wednesday	(Germany) Danny Röhl	Mutual consent	29 July 2025	Pre-season	(Denmark) Henrik Pedersen	31 July 2025
Sheffield United	(Spain) Rubén Sellés	Sacked	14 September 2025	24th	(England) Chris Wilder	15 September 2025
Watford	(Uruguayan Football Association) Paulo Pezzolano	Sacked	8 October 2025	11th	(Spain) Javi Gracia	8 October 2025
Southampton	(England) Will Still	Sacked	2 November 2025	21st	(Germany) Tonda Eckert (Note: Eckert was initially named interim head coach before being appointed on a permanent basis on 5 December 2025.)	2 November 2025
Norwich City	(England) Liam Manning	Sacked	8 November 2025	23rd	(Belgium) Philippe Clement	18 November 2025
Swansea City	(Republic of Ireland) Alan Sheehan	Sacked	11 November 2025	18th	(Portugal) Vítor Matos	24 November 2025
Middlesbrough	(Wales) Rob Edwards	Signed by Wolverhampton Wanderers	12 November 2025	2nd	(Sweden) Kim Hellberg	24 November 2025
Oxford United	(England) Gary Rowett	Sacked	23 December 2025	22nd	(England) Matt Bloomfield	9 January 2026
West Bromwich Albion	(England) Ryan Mason	Sacked	6 January 2026	18th	(Wales) Eric Ramsay	11 January 2026
Leicester City	(Spain) Martí Cifuentes	Sacked	25 January 2026	14th	(England) Gary Rowett	18 February 2026
Watford	(Spain) Javi Gracia	Resigned	1 February 2026	10th	(England) Edward Still	9 February 2026
Blackburn Rovers	(France) Valérien Ismaël	Mutual consent	2 February 2026	22nd	(Northern Ireland) Michael O'Neill	13 February 2026
West Bromwich Albion	(Wales) Eric Ramsay	Sacked	24 February 2026	21st	(Scotland) James Morrison (Note: Morrison was appointed interim head coach until the end of the season on 4 March 2026, before being appointed on a permanent basis on 30 April 2026.)	24 February 2026
Bristol City	(Austria) Gerhard Struber	Sacked	27 March 2026	16th	(England) Roy Hodgson (interim)	27 March 2026

== League table ==
Pos	Team	Pld	W	D	L	GF	GA	GD	Pts	Promotion, qualification or relegation
1	Coventry City (C, P)	46	28	11	7	97	45	+52	95	Promotion to the Premier League
2	Ipswich Town (P)	46	23	15	8	80	47	+33	84	Promotion to the Premier League
3	Millwall	46	24	11	11	64	49	+15	83	Qualification for the Championship play-offs
4	Southampton (Note: Southampton qualified for the play-offs and defeated Middlesbrough to qualify for the final, but were subsequently disqualified for multiple breaches of EFL regulations related to the unauthorised filming of other clubs' training, with Middlesbrough taking their place in the play-off final.) (D)	46	22	14	10	82	56	+26	80	Qualification for the Championship play-offs
5	Middlesbrough	46	22	14	10	72	47	+25	80	Qualification for the Championship play-offs
6	Hull City (O, P)	46	21	10	15	70	66	+4	73	Qualification for the Championship play-offs
7	Wrexham	46	19	14	13	69	65	+4	71	
8	Derby County	46	20	9	17	67	59	+8	69	
9	Norwich City	46	19	8	19	63	56	+7	65	
10	Birmingham City	46	17	13	16	57	56	+1	64	
11	Swansea City	46	18	10	18	57	59	−2	64	
12	Bristol City	46	17	11	18	59	59	0	62	
13	Sheffield United	46	18	6	22	66	66	0	60	
14	Preston North End	46	15	15	16	55	62	−7	60	
15	Queens Park Rangers	46	16	10	20	61	73	−12	58	
16	Watford	46	14	15	17	53	65	−12	57	
17	Stoke City	46	15	10	21	51	56	−5	55	
18	Portsmouth	46	14	13	19	49	64	−15	55	
19	Charlton Athletic	46	13	14	19	44	58	−14	53	
20	Blackburn Rovers	46	13	13	20	42	56	−14	52	
21	West Bromwich Albion	46	13	14	19	48	58	−10	51 (Note: West Bromwich Albion were deducted two points on 24 April 2026 for breaching PSR rules.)	
22	Oxford United (R)	46	11	14	21	45	59	−14	47	Relegation to EFL League One
23	Leicester City (R)	46	12	16	18	58	68	−10	46 (Note: Leicester City were deducted six points on 5 February 2026 for breaching PSR rules.)	Relegation to EFL League One
24	Sheffield Wednesday (R)	46	2	12	32	29	89	−60	0 (Note: Sheffield Wednesday were deducted twelve points due to filing for administration on 24 October 2025, then deducted a further six points on 1 December 2025 for failing to fulfil payment obligations.)	Relegation to EFL League One

Source: EFL Official Website
Rules for classification: 1) Points; 2) Goal difference; 3) Number of goals scored; 4) Head-to-head results; 5) Wins; 6) Away goals; 7) Penalty points (sec 9.5); 8) Number of 12-point sending off offences; 9) Play-off (only if needed to determine promotion/relegation)
(C) Champions; (D) Disqualified; (O) Play-off winners; (P) Promoted; (R) Relegated

== Results ==
Home \ Away	BIR	BLA	BRI	CHA	COV	DER	HUL	IPS	LEI	MID	MIL	NOR	OXF	POR	PNE	QPR	SHU	SHW	SOU	STO	SWA	WAT	WBA	WRX
Birmingham City	—	0–1	2–1	1–1	3–2	1–1	2–3	1–1	2–1	1–3	4–0	4–1	1–0	4–0	2–1	1–0	1–1	2–2	1–1	1–1	1–0	2–1	0–0	2–0
Blackburn Rovers	1–2	—	1–2	2–2	1–1	1–2	0–1	1–1	0–1	0–0	2–0	0–2	1–1	1–1	1–0	0–1	1–3	1–0	2–1	1–1	1–2	1–1	0–0	0–2
Bristol City	1–0	0–1	—	0–0	0–2	0–5	4–2	1–1	2–2	2–0	0–1	2–4	1–3	5–0	0–2	1–2	1–0	2–0	3–1	2–0	3–0	1–2	0–1	2–2
Charlton Athletic	1–0	3–0	1–2	—	1–1	1–2	2–1	1–2	0–1	1–2	1–1	0–1	1–0	1–3	1–2	0–0	1–0	2–1	1–5	1–0	1–1	1–0	1–0	0–1
Coventry City	3–0	2–0	1–0	3–1	—	3–2	0–0	0–2	2–1	3–1	2–1	1–1	0–0	5–1	3–0	7–1	3–1	0–0	1–2	2–1	1–0	3–1	3–2	3–1
Derby County	1–0	3–1	1–1	1–1	3–5	—	2–1	1–2	1–3	1–0	1–1	1–0	1–0	1–1	0–1	1–0	1–2	2–1	1–1	2–0	2–0	2–3	1–1	1–2
Hull City	1–1	0–3	2–3	1–1	0–0	4–2	—	0–2	2–1	1–4	1–3	2–1	3–2	3–2	2–2	1–3	1–0	3–1	3–1	0–1	2–1	0–0	1–0	2–0
Ipswich Town	2–1	3–0	2–0	0–3	3–0	2–2	1–0	—	1–1	2–2	1–1	3–1	2–1	2–1	1–1	3–0	5–0	3–1	1–1	1–0	3–0	1–1	1–0	0–0
Leicester City	2–0	0–2	2–0	0–2	0–0	2–1	2–2	3–1	—	1–1	1–1	0–2	1–2	1–1	2–2	1–3	2–3	2–1	3–4	2–1	0–1	1–2	2–1	1–1
Middlesbrough	2–1	0–0	1–1	0–1	2–4	2–1	0–1	2–1	1–1	—	1–2	1–0	0–0	0–1	4–0	3–1	1–0	1–0	4–0	0–0	1–0	5–1	2–1	1–1
Millwall	3–0	1–2	2–1	4–0	0–4	1–0	1–3	0–0	1–0	0–3	—	1–2	2–0	1–3	1–1	2–0	1–1	1–0	3–2	2–0	2–1	1–0	3–0	0–2
Norwich City	1–2	2–0	0–1	1–0	2–1	2–1	0–2	0–2	1–2	1–2	1–2	—	1–1	1–1	2–0	3–1	2–1	2–0	2–1	0–2	1–1	0–1	0–1	2–3
Oxford United	0–2	1–0	0–0	1–1	2–2	1–0	1–1	2–1	2–2	1–1	2–2	0–3	—	0–1	1–2	0–0	0–1	4–1	2–1	0–3	0–1	2–0	2–1	0–1
Portsmouth	1–1	2–1	0–1	2–1	1–2	0–1	0–1	2–0	1–0	1–0	3–1	1–2	2–2	—	1–0	1–1	0–1	0–2	1–1	0–1	1–2	2–2	3–0	0–0
Preston North End	0–1	1–2	0–0	2–0	1–1	0–1	0–3	1–0	2–1	2–2	0–2	1–1	1–3	1–0	—	1–1	3–2	3–0	1–3	3–1	2–1	2–2	0–2	1–1
Queens Park Rangers	2–1	1–3	0–0	3–1	2–1	2–3	3–2	1–4	4–1	0–4	1–2	1–2	0–0	6–1	1–1	—	0–2	3–0	1–2	1–0	1–2	2–1	3–1	2–3
Sheffield United	3–0	1–3	1–4	0–1	1–2	1–3	2–1	3–1	3–1	1–2	0–1	1–1	3–1	3–0	2–3	0–0	—	2–1	1–2	4–0	3–3	1–0	1–1	1–2
Sheffield Wednesday	0–2	0–0	0–3	1–1	0–5	0–3	2–2	0–2	1–1	0–1	1–2	1–1	1–2	0–1	2–3	1–1	0–3	—	1–3	0–3	0–2	1–1	2–1	0–1
Southampton	3–1	3–0	2–2	1–1	1–1	2–1	1–2	2–2	3–0	1–1	0–0	1–0	2–0	0–0	0–2	5–0	1–0	3–1	—	1–2	0–0	1–0	3–2	2–1
Stoke City	1–0	1–1	5–1	3–0	0–1	3–1	1–2	3–3	2–2	1–2	1–3	1–1	2–1	1–3	0–0	0–0	1–2	2–0	0–2	—	2–1	3–1	0–1	1–0
Swansea City	1–1	3–1	1–0	3–1	0–3	1–2	2–2	1–4	1–3	2–2	1–1	2–1	2–0	1–0	1–1	0–1	1–0	4–0	1–2	2–0	—	1–1	1–0	2–1
Watford	3–0	0–1	1–1	1–1	0–4	2–0	2–1	0–2	0–0	3–0	0–2	3–2	2–1	1–1	1–1	2–1	0–2	1–1	2–2	1–0	0–2	—	2–1	3–1
West Bromwich Albion	1–1	1–0	1–2	1–1	0–2	0–1	3–0	0–0	1–1	2–3	0–0	0–5	2–1	1–1	2–1	2–1	2–0	0–0	1–1	0–0	3–2	3–0	—	2–2
Wrexham	1–1	1–1	2–0	1–0	3–2	1–1	1–2	5–3	1–1	2–2	0–2	1–2	1–0	2–1	2–1	1–3	5–3	2–2	1–5	2–0	2–0	2–2	2–3	—

Source: efl.com
Legend: Blue = home team win; Yellow = draw; Red = away team win.
For upcoming matches, an "a" indicates there is an article about the rivalry between the two participants.

== Play-offs ==
=== Bracket ===
Semi-finals
3	Millwall	0	0	0
6	Hull City	0	2	2
4	~~Southampton (a.e.t.)~~	~~0~~	~~2~~	~~2~~
5	Middlesbrough	0	1	1

Final
6	Hull City	1
5	Middlesbrough	0

=== Semi-finals ===
First leg

8 May 2026
20:00 BST

Hull City	0–0	Millwall
	Report

MKM Stadium, Kingston upon Hull
Attendance: 24,623
Referee: Gavin Ward
9 May 2026
12:30 BST

Middlesbrough	0–0	Southampton
	Report

Riverside Stadium, Middlesbrough
Attendance: 32,045
Referee: Farai Hallam

Second leg

11 May 2026
20:00 BST

Millwall	0–2	Hull City
	Report	Belloumi 64'; Gelhardt 79'

The Den, London
Attendance: 17,768
Referee: Sam Barrott

Hull City won 2–0 on aggregate.

12 May 2026
20:00 BST

Southampton	2–1 (a.e.t.)	Middlesbrough
Stewart 45+1'; Charles 116'	Report	McGree 5'

St Mary's Stadium, Southampton
Attendance: 30,277
Referee: Andrew Madley

Southampton won 2–1 on aggregate; however, Middlesbrough advanced to the final on walkover after Southampton were disqualified for spying on other teams (see Southampton F.C. espionage incident).

=== Championship Final ===
23 May 2026
15:30 BST

Hull City	1−0	Middlesbrough
McBurnie 90+5'	Report

Wembley Stadium, London
Attendance: 84,506
Referee: Jarred Gillett

== Season statistics ==
=== Top scorers ===
Rank	Player	Club	Goals
1	(Slovenia) Žan Vipotnik	Swansea City	23
2	(Scotland) Oli McBurnie^{1}	Hull City	18
3	(United States) Haji Wright	Coventry City	17
4	(England) Jack Clarke	Ipswich Town	16
4	(England) Josh Windass	Wrexham	16
6	(England) Joe Gelhardt^{1}	Hull City	15
7	(England) Morgan Whittaker	Middlesbrough	14
8	(Scotland) Tommy Conway	Middlesbrough	13
8	(England) Ellis Simms	Coventry City	13
8	(Ghana) Brandon Thomas-Asante	Coventry City	13

- ^{1} Includes 1 goal in the Championship play-offs.

=== Hat-tricks ===
Player	For	Against	Result	Date
(England) Jaden Philogene	Ipswich Town	Sheffield United	5–0 (H)	12 September 2025
(Wales) Kieffer Moore	Wrexham	Coventry City	3–2 (H)	31 October 2025
(England) Carlton Morris	Derby County	Sheffield United	3–1 (A)	1 November 2025
(England) Divin Mubama	Stoke City	Bristol City	5–1 (H)	1 November 2025
(England) Tom Ince	Watford	Birmingham City	3–0 (H)	1 January 2026
(Australia) Mohamed Touré	Norwich City	Oxford United	3–0 (A)	10 February 2026
(United States) Haji Wright	Coventry City	Middlesbrough	3–1 (H)	16 February 2026
(Australia) Mohamed Touré	Norwich City	Bristol City	4–2 (A)	18 April 2026
(Croatia) Adrian Segečić	Portsmouth	Stoke City	3–1 (A)	25 April 2026
(England) Ellis Simms	Coventry City	Watford	4–0 (A)	2 May 2026

=== Clean sheets ===
Rank	Player	Club	Clean sheets
1	(England) Carl Rushworth	Coventry City	17
2	(England) Christian Walton	Ipswich Town	16
3	(England) Sol Brynn^{1}	Middlesbrough	14
3	(Croatia) Ivor Pandur^{3}	Hull City	14
5	(Chile) Lawrence Vigouroux	Swansea City	12
5	(Czech Republic) Radek Vítek	Bristol City	12
7	(Belgium) Thomas Kaminski	Charlton Athletic	11
8	(Nigeria) Arthur Okonkwo	Wrexham	10
8	(Republic of Ireland) Max O'Leary	West Bromwich Albion	10

- ^{1} Includes 1 clean sheet in the Championship play-offs.
- ^{3} Includes 3 clean sheets in the Championship play-offs.

=== Discipline ===
==== Player ====
- Most yellow cards: 13
  - (England) Matt Crooks (Hull City)
- Most red cards: 1
  - Fifty-six players

==== Club ====
- Most yellow cards: 115
  - Hull City
- Most red cards: 6
  - Sheffield United
- Fewest yellow cards: 68
  - Sheffield Wednesday
- Fewest red cards: 1
  - Eleven teams

== Awards ==
=== Monthly ===
Month	Manager of the Month		Player of the Month		Ref
August	(Wales) Rob Edwards	Middlesbrough	(United States) Josh Sargent	Norwich City	
September	(Northern Ireland) Kieran McKenna	Ipswich Town	(Scotland) Oli McBurnie	Hull City	
October	(England) Frank Lampard	Coventry City	(Ghana) Brandon Thomas-Asante	Coventry City	
November	(England) Frank Lampard	Coventry City	(England) Ellis Simms	Coventry City	
December	(Northern Ireland) Kieran McKenna	Ipswich Town	(England) Patrick Bamford	Sheffield United	
January	(Sweden) Kim Hellberg	Middlesbrough	(Republic of Ireland) Alan Browne	Middlesbrough	
February	(Germany) Tonda Eckert	Southampton	(Nigeria) Femi Azeez	Millwall	
March	(Germany) Tonda Eckert	Southampton	(England) Josh Coburn	Millwall	
April	(Germany) Tonda Eckert	Southampton	(Croatia) Adrian Segečić	Portsmouth	

=== Annual ===
Award	Winner	Club
Player Of The Season	(England) Hayden Hackney	Middlesbrough
Young Player Of The Season	(Wales) Jordan James	Leicester City
Apprentice Of The Season	(England) Louis Page	Leicester City

Championship Team Of The Season

Pos.	Player	Club	Ref.
GK	(England) Carl Rushworth	Coventry City	
RB	(Netherlands) Milan van Ewijk	Coventry City	
CB	(France) Tristan Crama	Millwall	
CB	(England) Callum Doyle	Wrexham	
LB	(England) Josh Tymon	Swansea City	
CM	(England) Matt Grimes	Coventry City	
CM	(England) Hayden Hackney	Middlesbrough	
AM	(Nigeria) Femi Azeez	Millwall	
RW	(Wales) Sorba Thomas	Stoke City	
LW	(United States) Haji Wright	Coventry City	
FW	(Slovenia) Žan Vipotnik	Swansea City	
Manager	(England) Frank Lampard	Coventry City	

== Attendances ==
EFL Championship clubs listed by average home league attendance in the 2025–26 season:

Pos	Club	Average attendance
1	Coventry City	30,290
2	Derby County	28,911
3	Leicester City	28,907
4	Southampton FC	28,444
5	Ipswich Town	28,303
6	Sheffield United	27,676
7	Middlesbrough FC	27,622
8	Birmingham City	27,163
9	Norwich City	25,886
10	Sheffield Wednesday	23,828
11	Stoke City	23,698
12	West Bromwich Albion	23,582
13	Bristol City	23,270
14	Hull City	21,400
15	Portsmouth FC	20,120
16	Charlton Athletic	20,066
17	Watford FC	18,613
18	Millwall	17,135
19	Preston North End	16,813
20	Swansea City	16,786
21	Queens Park Rangers	16,675
22	Blackburn Rovers	14,800
23	Oxford United	11,078
24	Wrexham AFC	10,668
