= EFL Championship Player of the Month =

Award in English football

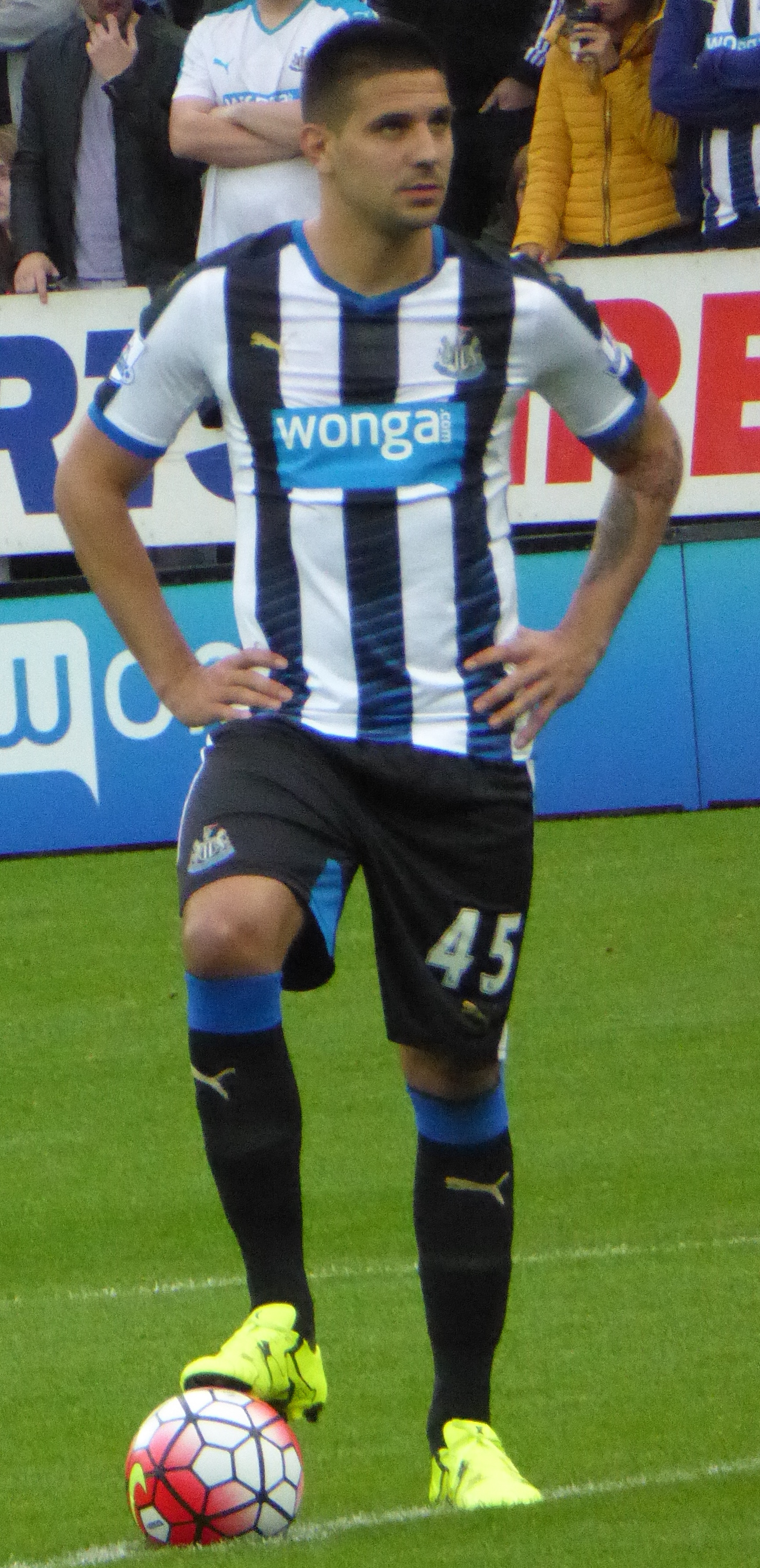
Aleksandar Mitrović has won the award 4 times.

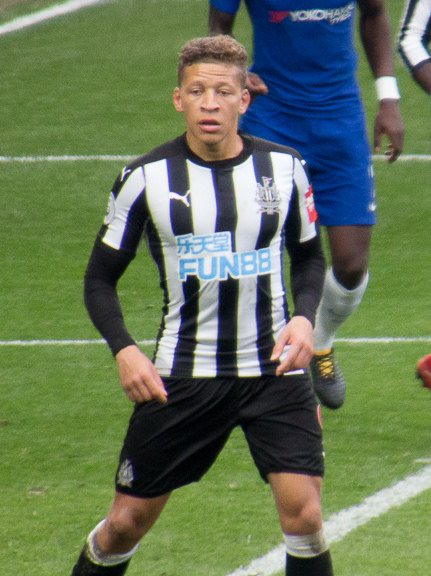
Dwight Gayle has won the award 3 times.

The EFL Championship Player of the Month is an association football award that recognises the player adjudged the best for each month of the season in the EFL Championship, the second tier of English football. Originally named the Football League Championship Player of the Month award, it replaced the First Division Player of the Month as the Championship replaced the Second Division in 2004, and in 2016, when the Football League rebranded itself as the English Football League (EFL), the award was renamed accordingly. For sponsorship reasons, since its inception it has been known as the Coca-Cola Player of the Month award; Coca-Cola sponsored the Football League since 2004 and the deal ended 2010. From the 2010–11 to the 2012–13 season, the Football League was sponsored by NPower, so it was known as the NPower Player of the Month award. As of the 2013–14 season, the league has been sponsored by Skybet, so it is now the SkyBet Player of the Month award. The awards are designed and manufactured in the UK by bespoke awards company Gaudio Awards.

== List of winners ==
- Each year in the table below is linked to the corresponding football season.

Month	Year	Nationality	Player	Team	Ref
August	2004	Nigeria	Ade Akinbiyi	Stoke City	
September	2004	England	Steve Sidwell	Reading	
October	2004	Northern Ireland	Kevin Horlock	Ipswich Town	
November	2004	England	Robbie Blake	Burnley	
December	2004	England	Dean Ashton	Crewe Alexandra	
January	2005	Wales	Danny Gabbidon	Cardiff City	
February	2005	England	Marcus Tudgay	Derby County	
March	2005	England	David Nugent	Preston North End	
April	2005	England	Teddy Sheringham	West Ham United	
August	2005	England	Joleon Lescott	Wolverhampton Wanderers	
September	2005	England	Kevin Nicholls	Luton Town	
October	2005	Senegal	Ibrahima Sonko	Reading	
November	2005	Guinea	Sambégou Bangoura	Stoke City	
December	2005	England	Dave Kitson	Reading	
January	2006	Jamaica	Marlon King	Watford	
February	2006	England	Dennis Wise	Coventry City	
March	2006	Spain	Iñigo Idiakez	Derby County	
April	2006	Jamaica	Ricardo Fuller	Stoke City	
August	2006	Wales	Gareth Bale	Southampton	
September	2006	England	Michael Chopra	Cardiff City	
October	2006	Senegal	Diomansy Kamara	West Bromwich Albion	
November	2006	England	Darel Russell	Stoke City	
December	2006	Wales	Jason Koumas	West Bromwich Albion	
January	2007	England	David Nugent	Preston North End	
February	2007	Ireland	Stephen Ward	Wolverhampton Wanderers	
March	2007	England	Giles Barnes	Derby County	
April	2007	England	Jamie Cureton	Colchester United	
August	2007	Wales	Freddy Eastwood	Wolverhampton Wanderers	
September	2007	England	Darius Henderson	Watford	
October	2007	England	Ryan Shawcross	Stoke City	
November	2007	Scotland	Chris Iwelumo	Charlton Athletic	
December	2007	England	Kevin Phillips	West Bromwich Albion	
January	2008	Wales	Joe Ledley	Cardiff City	
February	2008	Ireland	Liam Lawrence	Stoke City	
March	2008	England	Sylvan Ebanks-Blake	Wolverhampton Wanderers	
April	2008	England	James Beattie	Sheffield United	
August	2008	England	Richard Chaplow	Preston North End	
September	2008	Ireland	Kevin Doyle	Reading	
October	2008	England	Rob Hulse	Derby County	
November	2008	Scotland	Chris Iwelumo	Wolverhampton Wanderers	
December	2008	Ireland	Stephen Hunt	Reading	
January	2009	Wales	Joe Ledley	Cardiff City	
February	2009	Trinidad and Tobago	Jason Scotland	Swansea City	
March	2009	England	Robbie Blake	Burnley	
April	2009	England	Kyle Naughton	Sheffield United	
August	2009	England	Shola Ameobi	Newcastle United	
September	2009	Ireland	Leon Best	Coventry City	
October	2009	England	Peter Whittingham	Cardiff City	
November	2009	England	Darren Ambrose	Crystal Palace	
December	2009	England	Lee Camp	Nottingham Forest	
January	2010	Scotland	Charlie Adam	Blackpool	
February	2010	Scotland	Paul Gallagher	Leicester City	
March	2010	Iceland	Gylfi Sigurðsson	Reading	
April	2010	England	Kevin Nolan	Newcastle United	
August	2010	Morocco	Adel Taarabt	Queens Park Rangers	
September	2010	Scotland	Jamie Mackie	Queens Park Rangers	
October	2010	England	Jay Bothroyd	Cardiff City	
November	2010	England	James Hayter	Doncaster Rovers	
December	2010	England	Danny Graham	Watford	
January	2011	England	Richie Wellens	Leicester City	
February	2011	England	Connor Wickham	Ipswich Town	
March	2011	Ireland	Ian Harte	Reading	
April	2011	Canada	Simeon Jackson	Norwich City	
August	2011	Netherlands	Marvin Emnes	Middlesbrough	
September	2011	England	Matthew Bates	Middlesbrough	
October	2011	England	Nathaniel Clyne	Crystal Palace	
November	2011	England	Billy Sharp	Doncaster Rovers	
December	2011	Scotland	Alex Pearce	Reading	
January	2012	England	Curtis Davies	Birmingham City	
February	2012	Australia	Adam Federici	Reading	
March	2012	England	Garath McCleary	Nottingham Forest	
April	2012	Portugal	Ricardo Vaz Tê	West Ham United	
August	2012	England	Tom Ince	Blackpool	
September	2012	England	Glenn Murray	Crystal Palace	
October	2012	England	Charlie Austin	Burnley	
November	2012	Nigeria	Sone Aluko	Hull City	
December	2012	England	Dwight Gayle	Peterborough United	
January	2013	Czech Republic	Matěj Vydra	Watford	
February	2013	England	Fraizer Campbell	Cardiff City	
March	2013	Scotland	George Boyd	Hull City	
April	2013	England	James Vaughan	Huddersfield Town	
August	2013	England	James Vaughan	Huddersfield Town	
September	2013	England	David McGoldrick	Ipswich Town	
October	2013	England	Danny Ings	Burnley	
November	2013	Scotland	Ross McCormack	Leeds United	
December	2013	England	Danny Drinkwater	Leicester City	
January	2014	England	Adam Le Fondre	Reading	
February	2014	Wales	Sam Vokes	Burnley	
March	2014	England	Ravel Morrison	Queens Park Rangers	
April	2014	Benin	Rudy Gestede	Blackburn Rovers	
August	2014	Angola	Igor Vetokele	Charlton Athletic	
September	2014	England	Tyrone Mings	Ipswich Town	
October	2014	England	Callum Wilson	AFC Bournemouth	
November	2014	England	Andre Gray	Brentford	
December	2014	Ireland	Daryl Murphy	Ipswich Town	
January	2015	England	Lee Tomlin	Middlesbrough	
February	2015	England	Henri Lansbury	Nottingham Forest	
March	2015	England	Troy Deeney	Watford	
April	2015	England	Tom Ince	Derby County	
August	2015	DR Congo	Kazenga LuaLua	Brighton & Hove Albion	
September	2015	England	Jordan Rhodes	Blackburn Rovers	
October	2015	Ireland	Alan Judge	Brentford	
November	2015	Ireland	Daryl Murphy	Ipswich Town	
December	2015	England	Adam Clayton	Middlesbrough	
January	2016	Uruguay	Abel Hernández	Hull City	
February	2016	England	Aden Flint	Bristol City	
March	2016	Wales	Sam Vokes	Burnley	
April	2016	France	Anthony Knockaert	Brighton & Hove Albion	
August	2016	Ireland	Conor Hourihane	Barnsley	
September	2016	Ireland	Scott Hogan	Brentford	
October	2016	Nigeria	Sone Aluko	Fulham	
November	2016	England	Henri Lansbury	Nottingham Forest	
December	2016	England	Sam Winnall	Barnsley	
January	2017	New Zealand	Chris Wood	Leeds United	
February	2017	Ireland	Aiden McGeady	Preston North End	
March	2017	England	Tom Barkhuizen	Preston North End	
April	2017	France	Yann Kermorgant	Reading	
August	2017	England	Nathaniel Mendez-Laing	Cardiff City	
September	2017	England	Aden Flint	Bristol City	
October	2017	Brazil	Léo Bonatini	Wolverhampton Wanderers	
November	2017	England	Leon Clarke	Sheffield United	
December	2017	England	Scott Carson	Derby County	
January	2018	England	Ryan Sessegnon	Fulham	
February	2018	Scotland	Oli McBurnie	Barnsley	
March	2018	Serbia	Aleksandar Mitrović	Fulham	
April	2018	Serbia	Aleksandar Mitrović	Fulham	
August	2018	England	Kemar Roofe	Leeds United	
September	2018	England	Dwight Gayle	West Bromwich Albion	
October	2018	England	Lukas Jutkiewicz	Birmingham City	
November	2018	England	Tammy Abraham	Aston Villa	
December	2018	England	Jarrod Bowen	Hull City	
January	2019	England	Adam Armstrong	Blackburn Rovers	
February	2019	England	Ché Adams	Birmingham City	
March	2019	Nigeria	Semi Ajayi	Rotherham United	
April	2019	England	Dwight Gayle	West Bromwich Albion	
August	2019	Jamaica	Daniel Johnson	Preston North End	
September	2019	England	Chey Dunkley	Wigan Athletic	
October	2019	Serbia	Aleksandar Mitrović	Fulham	
November	2019	England	Jarrod Bowen	Hull City	
December	2019	England	Conor Chaplin	Barnsley	
January	2020	Bermuda	Nahki Wells	Queens Park Rangers	
February	2020	Ireland	Scott Hogan	Birmingham City	
June	2020	England	Jason Pearce	Charlton Athletic	
July	2020	Algeria	Saïd Benrahma	Brentford	
September	2020	England	Bradley Johnson	Blackburn Rovers	
October	2020	England	Ivan Toney	Brentford	
November	2020	Wales	David Brooks	AFC Bournemouth	
December	2020	England	Duncan Watmore	Middlesbrough	
January	2021	England	Matt Crooks	Rotherham United	
February	2021	Finland	Teemu Pukki	Norwich City	
March	2021	England	Alex Mowatt	Barnsley	
April	2021	Netherlands	Arnaut Danjuma	AFC Bournemouth	
August	2021	Wales	Sorba Thomas	Huddersfield Town	
September	2021	Chile	Ben Brereton Díaz	Blackburn Rovers	
October	2021	Serbia	Aleksandar Mitrović	Fulham	
November	2021	England	Chris Willock	Queens Park Rangers	
December	2021	England	Isaiah Jones	Middlesbrough	
January	2022	England	Antoine Semenyo	Bristol City	
February	2022	Angola	Lucas João	Reading	
March	2022	England	Djed Spence	Nottingham Forest	
April	2022	Wales	Brennan Johnson	Nottingham Forest	
August	2022	Colombia	Óscar Estupiñán	Hull City	
September	2022	England	Carlton Morris	Luton Town	
October	2022	England	Jerry Yates	Blackpool	
November	2022	Sweden	Viktor Gyökeres	Coventry City	
December	2022	England	Chuba Akpom	Middlesbrough	
January	2023	Netherlands	Ian Maatsen	Burnley	
February	2023	Wales	Tom Bradshaw	Millwall	
March	2023	Sweden	Viktor Gyökeres	Coventry City	
April	2023	Netherlands	Gustavo Hamer	Coventry City	
August	2023	Brazil	Gabriel Sara	Norwich City	
September	2023	England	Jack Clarke	Sunderland	
October	2023	Netherlands	Crysencio Summerville	Leeds United	
November	2023	Ireland	Sammie Szmodics	Blackburn Rovers	
December	2023	England	Stephy Mavididi	Leicester City	
January	2024	England	Morgan Whittaker	Plymouth Argyle	
February	2024	Jamaica	Omari Hutchinson	Ipswich Town	
March	2024	Ireland	Mikey Johnston	West Bromwich Albion	
April	2024	Ivory Coast	Emmanuel Latte Lath	Middlesbrough	
August	2024	Wales	Mark Harris	Oxford United	
September	2024	Spain	Borja Sainz	Norwich City	
October	2024	Spain	Borja Sainz	Norwich City	
November	2024	Ireland	Finn Azaz	Middlesbrough	
December	2024	England	Ephron Mason-Clark	Coventry City	
January	2025	England	James Trafford	Burnley	
February	2025	Wales	Daniel James	Leeds United	
March	2025	England	Tyrese Campbell	Sheffield United	
April	2025	England	Josh Brownhill	Burnley	
August	2025	United States	Josh Sargent	Norwich City	
September	2025	Scotland	Oli McBurnie	Hull City	
October	2025	Ghana	Brandon Thomas-Asante	Coventry City	
November	2025	England	Ellis Simms	Coventry City	
December	2025	England	Patrick Bamford	Sheffield United	
January	2026	Ireland	Alan Browne	Middlesbrough	
February	2026	Nigeria	Femi Azeez	Millwall	
March	2026	England	Josh Coburn	Millwall	
April	2026	Croatia	Adrian Segečić	Portsmouth	
August	2026	Canada	Cyle Larin	Southampton	
September	2026	Greece	Konstantinos Mavropanos	West Ham United	
October	2026	England	Will Lankshear	Middlesbrough	

== Multiple winners ==
Up to and including the January 2026 award.

- The table lists all the players who have won more than once.

Rank	Player	Wins
1	(Serbia) Aleksandar Mitrović	4
2	(England) Dwight Gayle	3
3	(Nigeria) Sone Aluko	2
3	(England) Robbie Blake	2
3	(England) Jarrod Bowen	2
3	(England) Aden Flint	2
3	(Sweden) Viktor Gyökeres	2
3	(Republic of Ireland) Scott Hogan	2
3	(England) Tom Ince	2
3	(Scotland) Chris Iwelumo	2
3	(England) Henri Lansbury	2
3	(Wales) Joe Ledley	2
3	(Scotland) Oli McBurnie	2
3	(Republic of Ireland) Daryl Murphy	2
3	(England) David Nugent	2
3	(Spain) Borja Sainz	2
3	(England) James Vaughan	2
3	(Wales) Sam Vokes	2

== Awards won by nationality ==
Up to and including the October 2026 award.

Country	Wins
England	105
Ireland	17
Wales	14
Scotland	10
Netherlands	5
Jamaica	4
Nigeria	4
Serbia	4
Spain	3
Angola	2
Brazil	2
Canada	2
France	2
Senegal	2
Sweden	2
Algeria	1
Australia	1
Benin	1
Bermuda	1
Chile	1
Colombia	1
Croatia	1
Czech Republic	1
DR Congo	1
Finland	1
Ghana	1
Greece	1
Guinea	1
Iceland	1
Ivory Coast	1
Morocco	1
New Zealand	1
Northern Ireland	1
Portugal	1
Trinidad and Tobago	1
United States	1
Uruguay	1

== Awards won by club ==
Up to and including the October 2026 award.

Club	Wins
Reading	12
Middlesbrough	11
Burnley	9
Cardiff City	8
Coventry City	8
Hull City	7
Ipswich Town	7
Blackburn Rovers	6
Derby County	6
Fulham	6
Norwich City	6
Nottingham Forest	6
Preston North End	6
Stoke City	6
West Bromwich Albion	6
Wolverhampton Wanderers	6
Barnsley	5
Brentford	5
Leeds United	5
Queens Park Rangers	5
Sheffield United	5
Watford	5
Birmingham City	4
Leicester City	4
Blackpool	3
AFC Bournemouth	3
Bristol City	3
Charlton Athletic	3
Crystal Palace	3
Huddersfield Town	3
Millwall	3
West Ham United	3
Brighton & Hove Albion	2
Doncaster Rovers	2
Luton Town	2
Newcastle United	2
Rotherham United	2
Southampton	2
Aston Villa	1
Colchester United	1
Crewe Alexandra	1
Oxford United	1
Peterborough United	1
Plymouth Argyle	1
Portsmouth	1
Sunderland	1
Swansea City	1
Wigan Athletic	1

== See also ==
- Premier League Player of the Month
- EFL Championship Manager of the Month
- EFL League One Player of the Month
- EFL League Two Player of the Month
