= 2026–27 Premier League =

Football season in England

Premier League
- Season: 2026–27
- Dates: 21 August 2026 – 30 May 2027
- Matches: 109
- Goals: 299 (2.74 per match)
- Top goalscorer: Erling Haaland (9 goals)
- Biggest home win: Brighton & Hove Albion 5–0 Crystal Palace (18 October 2026)
- Biggest away win: Coventry City 0–5 Brighton & Hove Albion (13 September 2026)
- Highest scoring: Manchester City 5–3; Sunderland (20 September 2026) Manchester United 4–4; Aston Villa (8 November 2026)
- Longest winning run: Manchester City (7 games)
- Longest unbeaten run: Aston Villa; Manchester City (7 games)
- Longest winless run: Manchester United (9 games)
- Longest losing run: Crystal Palace (5 games)
- Highest attendance: 74,161; Manchester United 0–1 Manchester City (13 September 2026)
- Lowest attendance: 11,135; Bournemouth 1–1 Everton (29 August 2026)
- Total attendance: 4,422,601
- Average attendance: 40,574
- All statistics correct as of 22 November 2026.

The 2026–27 Premier League is the 35th season of the Premier League and the 128th season of top-flight English football overall. The season began on 21 August 2026 and is scheduled to conclude on 30 May 2027. The full list of fixtures was released at 10:00 BST on 19 June 2026.

The 2026–27 season consists of 33 weekend and five midweek rounds of matches. The summer transfer window opened on 15 June 2026 and closed at 23:00 BST on 1 September 2026. The winter transfer window will open on 1 January 2027 and close at 23:00 GMT on 1 February 2027.

Arsenal are the defending champions.

== Summary ==
=== Developments ===
This season saw the usual opening fixtures and final matchweek postponed by one week due to the 2026 FIFA World Cup taking place during the off-season. The fixtures were published at 10:00 BST on 19 June 2026.

The previous calendar of five international breaks during the season will be reduced to four, with a three week international break between late September and early October occurring for the first time. During the late September–early October international break, it was confirmed by the Premier League that Manchester City were found guilty of a total of 114 charges related to breaching the Premier League's financial regulations between 2009 and 2018 – the club is currently appealing this verdict.

The Premier League implemented a ban on gambling sponsors appearing on the front of match day shirts from the 2026–27 season. This initiative aims to reduce the visibility of betting brands, following pressure regarding gambling normalisation, though betting companies can still sponsor sleeves, training kits, LED signs, and other club partnerships.

== Teams ==
Twenty teams are competing in the league – the top seventeen teams from the previous season and the three teams promoted from the Championship. The promoted teams are Coventry City, Ipswich Town and Hull City, returning to the top flight after absences of twenty-five, one and nine years respectively. The twenty-five years between Coventry City's previous Premier League season and this season was the longest absence for a previous Premier League club in the Premier League era to date. They replaced West Ham United, Burnley and Wolverhampton Wanderers, who were relegated to the Championship after fourteen, one and eight years in the top flight respectively.

=== Stadiums and locations ===
Locations of the 2026–27 Premier League teams
Greater London Premier League football clubs

Note: Table lists in alphabetical order.

Team	Location	Stadium	Capacity
Arsenal	London (Holloway)	Emirates Stadium	60,704
Aston Villa	Birmingham	Villa Park	36,887 (Note: Villa Park's capacity is reduced for the entire season due to redevelopment of the North Stand.)
Bournemouth	Bournemouth	Dean Court	12,357 (Note: Dean Court will undergo redevelopment over the course of the season.)
Brentford	London (Brentford)	Brentford Community Stadium	17,250
Brighton & Hove Albion	Falmer	Falmer Stadium	32,176
Chelsea	London (Fulham)	Stamford Bridge	40,044
Coventry City	Coventry	Coventry Building Society Arena	32,609
Crystal Palace	London (Selhurst)	Selhurst Park	25,194
Everton	Liverpool (Vauxhall)	Hill Dickinson Stadium	52,769
Fulham	London (Fulham)	Craven Cottage	28,107
Hull City	Kingston upon Hull	MKM Stadium	24,983
Ipswich Town	Ipswich	Portman Road	30,056
Leeds United	Leeds	Elland Road	37,633
Liverpool	Liverpool (Anfield)	Anfield	61,276
Manchester City	Manchester (Bradford)	City of Manchester Stadium	61,038
Manchester United	Manchester (Trafford)	Old Trafford	74,158
Newcastle United	Newcastle upon Tyne	St James' Park	52,729
Nottingham Forest	West Bridgford	City Ground	31,212
Sunderland	Sunderland	Stadium of Light	48,095
Tottenham Hotspur	London (Tottenham)	Tottenham Hotspur Stadium	62,850

For the 2026–27 season, the combined stadium capacity of the 20 Premier League clubs is 822,365, with an average of 41,118.

=== Personnel and kits ===
Team	Manager	Captain	Kit manufacturer	Shirt sponsor (chest)	Shirt sponsor (sleeve)
Arsenal	(Spain) Mikel Arteta	(Norway) Martin Ødegaard	(Germany) Adidas	(United Arab Emirates) Emirates	(Israel) Deel, Inc.
Aston Villa	(Spain) Unai Emery	(Scotland) John McGinn	(Germany) Adidas	Visit Rwanda	(Greece) Betano
Bournemouth	(Germany) Marco Rose	(England) Adam Smith	(Denmark) Hummel	(United Kingdom) Vitality	(United Kingdom) MrQ
Brentford	(Republic of Ireland) Keith Andrews	(Republic of Ireland) Nathan Collins	(Spain) Joma	(United States) Indeed	(United Kingdom) Cazoo
Brighton & Hove Albion	(Germany) Fabian Hürzeler	(England) Lewis Dunk	(United States) Nike	(United States) American Express	(United States) Experience Kissimmee
Chelsea	(Spain) Xabi Alonso	(England) Reece James	(United States) Nike	(United States) USDC	(United Kingdom) Sokin
Coventry City	(England) Frank Lampard	(England) Matt Grimes	(Denmark) Hummel	(United Kingdom) Monzo	(China) Geely
Crystal Palace	(Denmark) Thomas Frank	(England) Dean Henderson	(Italy) Macron	(United States) Temporal	(Curaçao) CHEXX
Everton	(Scotland) David Moyes	(England) James Tarkowski	(United Kingdom) Castore	(United Kingdom) CMC Markets	(Curaçao) Stake.com
Fulham	(Spain) Álvaro Arbeloa	(Scotland) Tom Cairney	(Germany) Adidas	(United States) Clickhouse	(Israel) HiBob
Hull City	(Bosnia and Herzegovina) Sergej Jakirović	(England) Lewie Coyle	(United Kingdom) Oxen	(Turkey) Corendon Airlines	(United Kingdom) McVitie's
Ipswich Town	(England) Gary O'Neil	(Republic of Ireland) Dara O'Shea	(United Kingdom) Umbro	(United Kingdom) Halo Service Solutions	(United Kingdom) Play
Leeds United	(Germany) Daniel Farke	(Wales) Ethan Ampadu	(Germany) Adidas	(Austria) Red Bull	(Switzerland) KChat
Liverpool	(Spain) Andoni Iraola	(Netherlands) Virgil van Dijk	(Germany) Adidas	(United Kingdom) Standard Chartered	(United States) Expedia
Manchester City	(Italy) Enzo Maresca	(Portugal) Rúben Dias	(Germany) Puma	(United Arab Emirates) Etihad Airways	(United States) OKX
Manchester United	(Argentina) Mauricio Pochettino	(Portugal) Bruno Fernandes	(Germany) Adidas	(United States) Qualcomm Snapdragon	(United Kingdom) SumUp
Newcastle United	(Germany) Matthias Jaissle	(England) Dan Burn	(Germany) Adidas	(South Africa) KNOX Hydrate	(Saudi Arabia) Noon
Nottingham Forest	(Austria) Oliver Glasner	(England) Ryan Yates	(Germany) Adidas	(United Kingdom) Marex	(Greece) Bally's Intralot
Sunderland	(France) Régis Le Bris	(Switzerland) Granit Xhaka	(Denmark) Hummel	TBC	(Curaçao) Shuffle
Tottenham Hotspur	(Italy) Roberto De Zerbi	(Netherlands) Micky van de Ven	(United States) Nike	(Hong Kong) AIA	(United States) Kraken

=== Managerial changes ===
Team	Outgoing manager	Manner of departure	Date of vacancy	Position in the table	Incoming manager	Date of appointment
Bournemouth	(Spain) Andoni Iraola	End of contract	24 May 2026	Pre-season	(Germany) Marco Rose	1 June 2026
Chelsea	(England) Calum McFarlane	End of interim spell	24 May 2026	Pre-season	(Spain) Xabi Alonso	1 July 2026
Manchester City	(Spain) Pep Guardiola	Resigned	24 May 2026	Pre-season	(Italy) Enzo Maresca	29 June 2026
Crystal Palace	(Austria) Oliver Glasner	End of contract	27 May 2026	Pre-season	(France) Pierre Sage	15 June 2026
Liverpool	(Netherlands) Arne Slot	Sacked	30 May 2026	Pre-season	(Spain) Andoni Iraola	4 June 2026
Fulham	(Portugal) Marco Silva	End of contract	2 June 2026	Pre-season	(Spain) Álvaro Arbeloa	7 July 2026
Ipswich Town	(Northern Ireland) Kieran McKenna	Resigned	10 June 2026	Pre-season	(England) Gary O'Neil	23 June 2026
Nottingham Forest	(Portugal) Vítor Pereira	Sacked	2 July 2026	Pre-season	(Austria) Oliver Glasner	6 July 2026
Newcastle United	(England) Eddie Howe	Resigned	30 July 2026	Pre-season	(Germany) Matthias Jaissle	5 August 2026
Manchester United	(England) Michael Carrick	Sacked	12 November 2026	18th	(Argentina) Mauricio Pochettino	18 November 2026
Crystal Palace	(France) Pierre Sage	Sacked	12 November 2026	20th	(Denmark) Thomas Frank	16 November 2026

== League table ==
Pos	Team	Pld	W	D	L	GF	GA	GD	Pts	Qualification or relegation
1	Arsenal	11	9	1	1	17	7	+10	28	Qualification for the Champions League league phase
2	Brighton & Hove Albion	11	7	1	3	26	9	+17	22	Qualification for the Champions League league phase
3	Manchester City	11	7	1	3	22	14	+8	22	Qualification for the Champions League league phase
4	Liverpool	11	6	3	2	18	10	+8	21	Qualification for the Champions League league phase
5	Bournemouth	11	5	3	3	18	14	+4	18	Qualification for the Europa League league phase (Note: The winners of the 2026–27 FA Cup and the 5th-placed team both qualify for the Europa League. If the FA Cup winners finish in the top five, the 6th-placed team will qualify. If England are one of the two associations with the highest UEFA coefficient points, 5th place will qualify for the Champions League and the other qualifying spots will move down one position.)
6	Leeds United	11	4	5	2	14	9	+5	17	
7	Everton	10	4	4	2	12	10	+2	16	
8	Chelsea	11	5	1	5	20	20	0	16	
9	Tottenham Hotspur	11	4	3	4	12	11	+1	15	
10	Brentford	10	3	5	2	16	11	+5	14	
11	Hull City	11	3	5	3	13	11	+2	14	
12	Aston Villa	11	3	5	3	14	17	−3	14	
13	Newcastle United	11	3	4	4	15	18	−3	13	
14	Coventry City	11	4	0	7	13	21	−8	12	
15	Fulham	11	2	5	4	11	13	−2	11	
16	Ipswich Town	11	3	2	6	15	22	−7	11	
17	Nottingham Forest	11	2	3	6	9	15	−6	9	
18	Sunderland	11	2	3	6	8	17	−9	9	Relegation to EFL Championship
19	Manchester United	11	1	5	5	14	23	−9	8	Relegation to EFL Championship
20	Crystal Palace	11	2	1	8	12	27	−15	7	Relegation to EFL Championship

Updated to match(es) played on 22 November 2026. Source: Premier League
Rules for classification: 1) Points; 2) Goal difference; 3) Goals scored; 4) If the champions, relegated teams or qualified teams for UEFA competitions cannot be determined by rules 1 to 3 following the completion of the competition, rules 4.1 to 4.3 are applied between such teams – 4.1) Head-to-head points; 4.2) Head-to-head away goals; 4.3) Play-off at a neutral site.

== Results ==
Home \ Away	ARS	AVL	BOU	BRE	BHA	CHE	COV	CRY	EVE	FUL	HUL	IPS	LEE	LIV	MCI	MUN	NEW	NFO	SUN	TOT
Arsenal	—					2–1	3–0		2–0		1–0		2–1		a	a				a
Aston Villa	0–1	—		2–2						1–1					2–1			1–2	0–0	
Bournemouth			—	2–2					1–1				2–0	0–1				2–0	2–0	
Brentford				—		3–0				a				1–2				2–0	1–1	3–0
Brighton & Hove Albion	3–0	4–0		2–0	—			5–0					1–1							
Chelsea	a		5–1	a	4–3	—				a	2–2		1–4	a		2–0				0–2
Coventry City					0–5		—	3–2		0–1	0–1						4–1		3–1	
Crystal Palace					a			—				2–3		1–3	1–4		0–2	3–1		
Everton						0–2	3–1	2–0	—			1–0		a		2–2				
Fulham				a		2–3		2–3		—	1–0					1–1	1–1			
Hull City		0–0		1–1	2–0				2–2		—	2–2				2–0				
Ipswich Town			1–2							2–1		—		0–2				1–1	2–1	
Leeds United				1–1		a		0–0					—			1–1	4–1			1–0
Liverpool	0–1				2–0	a			a	0–0				—	0–3	4–0		2–2		
Manchester City	a		2–1		0–1		1–0			1–1		3–2		a	—	a			5–3	
Manchester United	a	4–4	0–3									5–2	a	a	0–1	—				1–1
Newcastle United	2–2	0–1	2–2						0–1		2–1			2–2			—		a	
Nottingham Forest	0–1						0–1						0–1		3–1			—		0–0
Sunderland	0–2				0–2	1–0				1–0			0–0				a		—	
Tottenham Hotspur	a	2–3				a	3–1	2–0	0–0			2–0					0–2			—

Updated to match(es) played on 22 November 2026. Source: Premier League
Legend: Blue = home team win; Yellow = draw; Red = away team win.
For upcoming matches, an "a" indicates there is an article about the rivalry between the two participants.

== Season statistics ==
As of 22 November 2026

=== Top scorers ===
Rank	Player	Club	Goals
1	(Norway) Erling Haaland	Manchester City	9
2	(Sweden) Alexander Isak	Liverpool	7
3	(France) Thierno Barry	Everton	6
3	(Brazil) Evanilson	Bournemouth	6
3	(Senegal) Nicolas Jackson	Aston Villa	6
6	(England) Dominic Calvert-Lewin	Leeds United	5
6	(France) Rayan Cherki	Manchester City	5
6	(Brazil) João Pedro	Chelsea	5
6	(England) Morgan Rogers	Chelsea	5
6	(England) Marcus Tavernier	Bournemouth	5

==== Hat-tricks ====
Player	For	Against	Result	Date
(Portugal) Bruno Fernandes	Manchester United	Ipswich Town	5–2 (H)	30 August 2026
(Netherlands) Brian Brobbey	Sunderland	Manchester City	3–5 (A)	20 September 2026

=== Clean sheets ===
Rank	Player	Club	Clean sheets
1	(Spain) David Raya	Arsenal	7
1	(Netherlands) Bart Verbruggen	Brighton & Hove Albion	7
3	(Brazil) Alisson	Liverpool	5
3	(Czech Republic) Antonín Kinský	Tottenham Hotspur	5
5	(Serbia) Đorđe Petrović	Bournemouth	4
5	(England) Jordan Pickford	Everton	4
5	(Netherlands) Robin Roefs	Sunderland	4
5	(England) James Trafford	Leeds United	4
5	(Greece) Konstantinos Tzolakis	Hull City	4

=== Discipline ===
==== Player ====
- Most yellow cards: 5
  - (Poland) Matty Cash (Aston Villa)
  - (England) Matt Crooks (Hull City)
  - (Spain) Yeremy Pino (Crystal Palace)
- Most red cards: 1
  - Twenty-one players

==== Club ====
- Most yellow cards: 32
  - Hull City
- Fewest yellow cards: 12
  - Coventry City
- Most red cards: 3
  - Brentford
  - Sunderland
- Fewest red cards: 0
  - Arsenal
  - Bournemouth
  - Everton
  - Hull City
  - Leeds United
  - Nottingham Forest

== Awards ==
=== Monthly awards ===
Month	Manager of the Month		Player of the Month		Goal of the Month		Save of the Month		References
Month	Manager	Club	Player	Club	Player	Club	Player	Club	References
August	(Bosnia and Herzegovina) Sergej Jakirović	Hull City	(Brazil) João Pedro	Chelsea	(Sweden) Anthony Elanga	Newcastle United	(England) Jordan Pickford	Everton	
September	(Germany) Fabian Hürzeler	Brighton & Hove Albion	(Germany) Pascal Groß	Brighton & Hove Albion	(England) Lewis Dunk	Brighton & Hove Albion	(Spain) David Raya	Arsenal	
October	(Italy) Roberto De Zerbi	Tottenham Hotspur	(Senegal) Nicolas Jackson	Aston Villa	(Paraguay) Diego Gómez	Brighton & Hove Albion	(Belgium) Mike Penders	Chelsea	
