= Vítor Matos =

Portuguese football manager

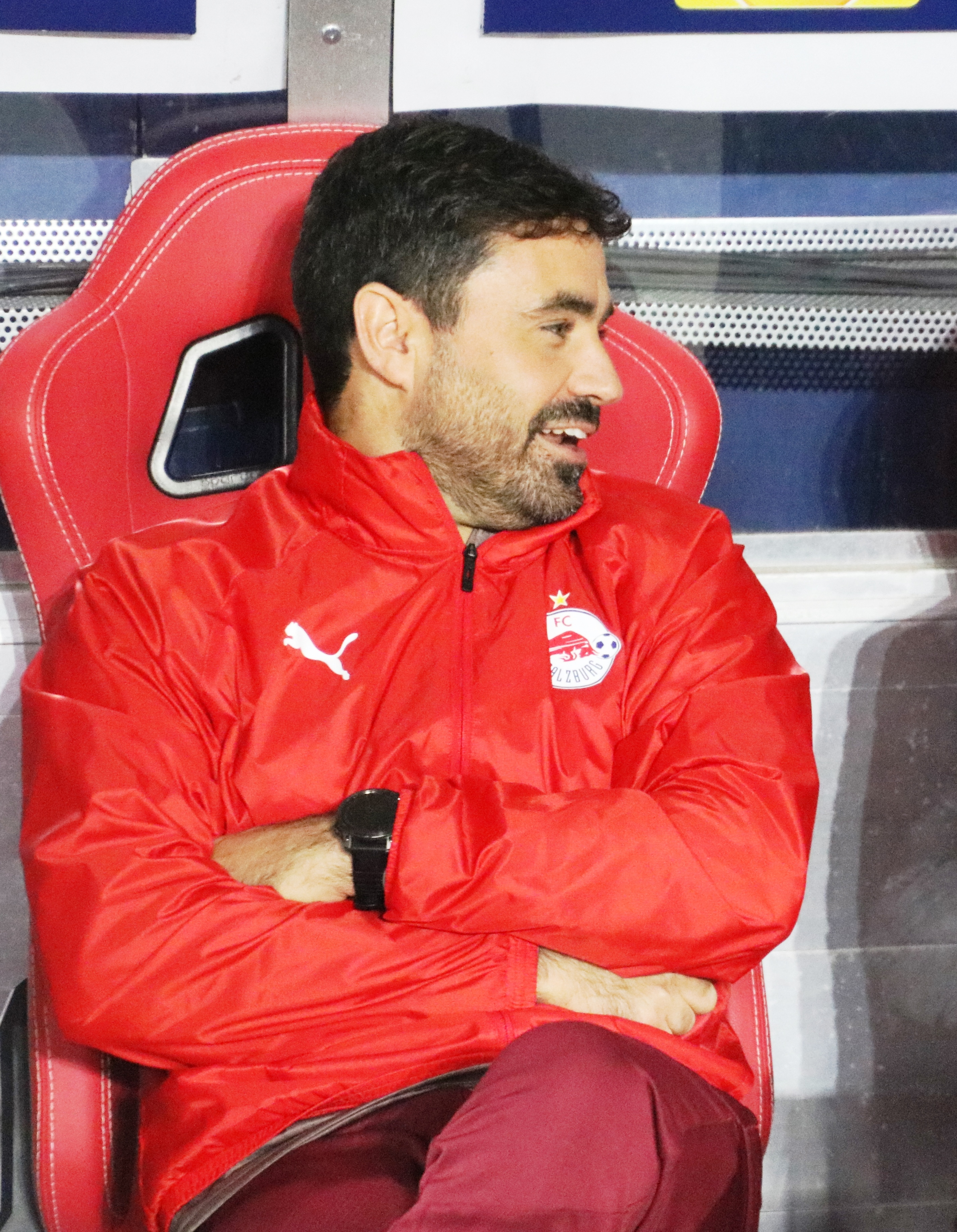
- Matos at Red Bull Salzburg in 2024

Personal information
- Full name: Vítor Emanuel Soares Matos
- Date of birth: 28 March 1988 (age 38)
- Place of birth: Mangualde, Portugal

Team information
- Current team: Strasbourg (head coach)

Youth career
- Years: Team
- 2002–2003: Coimbrões
- 2003–2007: Valadares

Managerial career
- 2025: Marítimo
- 2025–2026: Swansea City
- 2026–: Strasbourg

Vítor Emanuel Soares Matos (born 28 March 1988) is a Portuguese football manager who is the head coach of Ligue 1 club Strasbourg.

Matos began his career coaching youth teams in Portugal, including at Porto. After two years coaching at Shandong Luneng in China, he returned to Porto before joining Premier League club Liverpool as an elite development coach under Jürgen Klopp in 2019. Five years later, Matos joined Pepijn Lijnders as his assistant coach at Red Bull Salzburg.

In 2025, Matos became manager of Liga Portugal 2 club Marítimo, his first job as a head coach of a senior team. For twelve months from November 2025, he was head coach of Swansea City, arriving with the club in 20th in the EFL Championship and leaving with them in 6th.

== Career ==
=== Early career ===
Matos was born in Mangualde in Viseu District, and grew up in Vila Nova de Gaia in the Porto metropolitan area. He played football for Coimbrões and Valadares. At age 15, he was inspired to become a coach when compatriot José Mourinho won the UEFA Champions League for Porto in 2004. After studying in the Netherlands, Matos returned to Portugal aged 21 to manage Valadares' under-19s before moving to Trofense.

In 2011, Matos joined Porto, where he coached the under-9s to under-17s while working as an analyst for the under-19 and B-teams. He had two years in China with Shandong Luneng as their technical coordinator and under-16s coach, leading them to two youth championship titles. Matos then returned to Porto, where he was assistant manager of the B-team in 2018–19.

Matos joined Jürgen Klopp's staff at Liverpool in October 2019 as the club's elite development coach. He was tasked with developing Liverpool's academy players and helping them adapt to the first team. Matos also assisted with training sessions and game planning for the club's under-23s and first team, with Liverpool winning the Premier League during his first season.

In May 2024, Matos was one of twenty candidates to be issued a UEFA Pro Licence by the Football Association of Wales. Later that month, he left Liverpool, alongside Klopp and his assistant, Pepijn Lijnders. Matos then joined Lijnders as his assistant at Red Bull Salzburg in the Austrian Bundesliga, but the pair were dismissed in December 2024 with the team fifth in the league.

=== Marítimo ===
On 12 June 2025, Matos was given his first job as a head coach of a senior team, on a two-year contract at Marítimo in Liga Portugal 2. His release clause was set as €1 million. On his debut on 10 August, he lost 1–0 at home to Lusitânia Lourosa. He won six of his eleven league fixtures for the Madeiran club, taking them to third place in the table.

=== Swansea City ===
On 22 November 2025, Marítimo announced that Matos would join EFL Championship club Swansea City as their new head coach after the club triggered his release clause. He was announced by Swansea two days later, having signed a four-year contract. On his debut on 25 November, the team lost 2–1 at home to Derby County. He achieved his first win in his third game on 6 December, 2–0 against Oxford United at the Swansea.com Stadium. After helping Swansea finish 11th in his first season, he extended his contract to 2030.

Swansea City began the 2026–27 season with two wins and a draw from three games in August, earning Matos the EFL Championship Manager of the Month award. The club were in 6th place and three points off the lead when he left on 18 November.

=== Strasbourg ===
On 18 November 2026, Ligue 1 club Strasbourg announced the signing of Matos. He joined a team who were in 13th after 10 games under Hugo Oliveira. According to BBC Sport, Swansea would receive £5 million in compensation.

== Managerial statistics ==
As of match played 21 November 2026

Managerial record by team and tenure
Team	From	To	Record					Ref.
Team	From	To	P	W	D	L	Win %	Ref.
Marítimo	12 June 2025	24 November 2025	12	6	2	4	50.0	
Swansea City	24 November 2025	18 November 2026	47	22	8	17	46.8	
Strasbourg	18 November 2026	Present	1	0	0	1	0.0	
Total			60	28	10	22	46.7	

== Honours ==
=== Manager ===
Shandong Luneng

- U15 Chinese National Championship: 2017
- U15 SuperLeague Championship: 2017

=== Individual ===
Swansea City

- EFL Championship Manager of the Month: August 2026
