= Gambling advertising =

Promotion of gambling

Gambling advertisement from Australia for a mobile application used to gamble via lottery tickets.

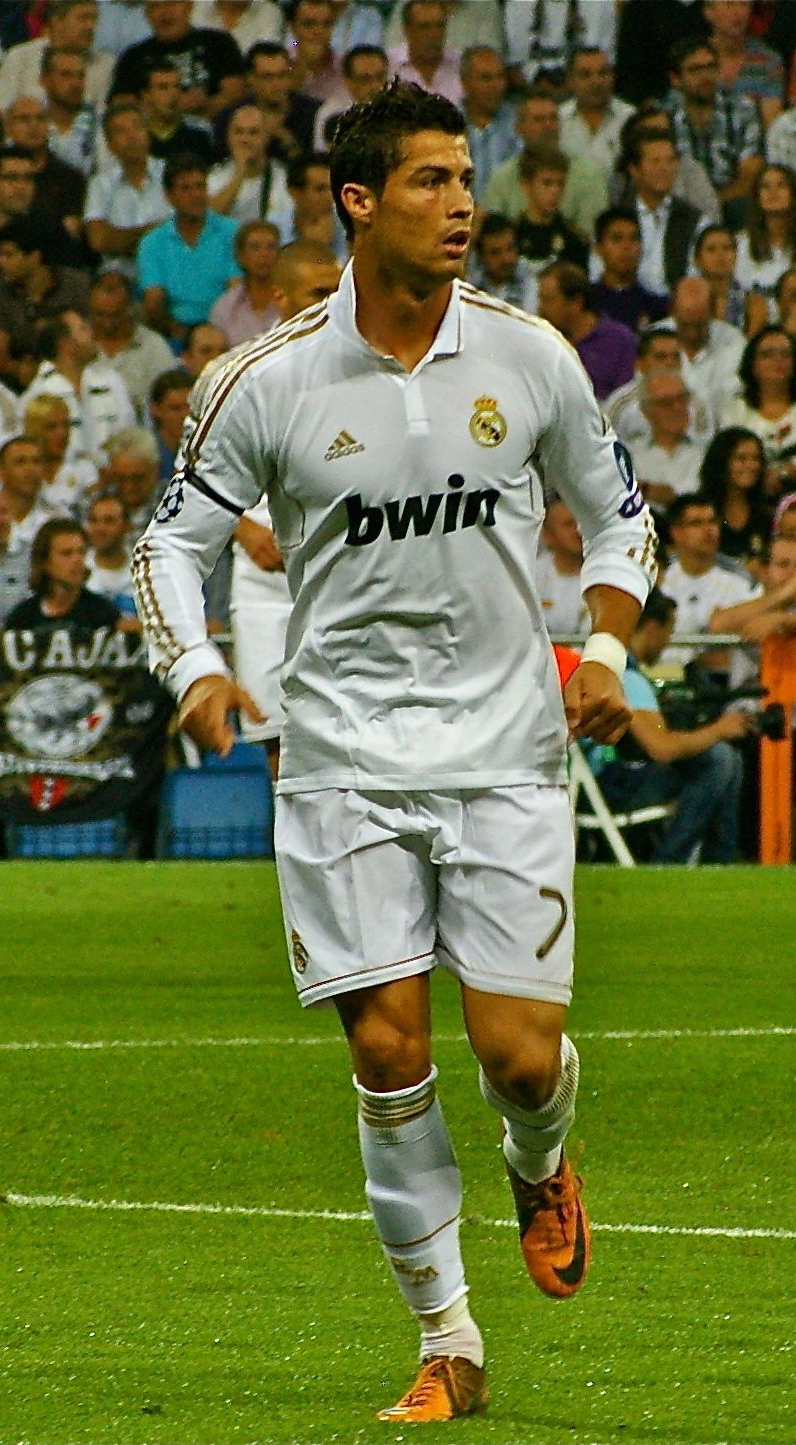
Shirt sponsorship, an example of gambling advertising in sports

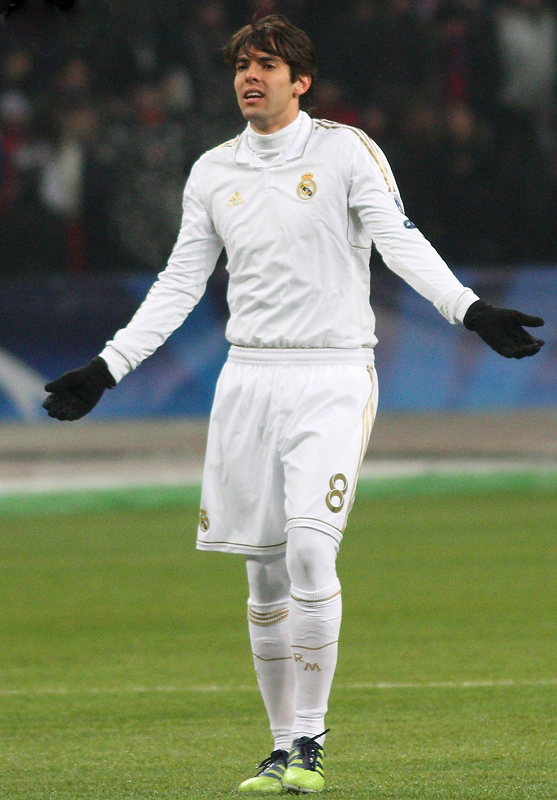
Kaká playing for Real Madrid CF against PFC CSKA Moscow in the UEFA Champions League in 2012. Due to laws around gambling advertising, Real Madrid's usual front shirt sponsor bwin was omitted from their kits during that match

Gambling advertising is the promotion of gambling by casinos, lotteries, video games, bookmakers or other organisations that provide the opportunity to make bets. It is usually conducted through a variety of media or through sponsorship deals, particularly with sporting events or people.

Although not as highly regulated as tobacco advertising and alcohol advertising, in many countries there are strict laws about the way in which such services can be marketed.

Gaming operators often sponsor sporting events, sportspeople or television coverage. For example, Bet365 sponsor snooker players and the Channel 4 coverage of The 2005 Ashes was sponsored by Betfair, both being online betting sites. In other instances, they will do stunts to get public attention. For example, many professional boxers have been sponsored by GoldenPalace.com, and sport temporary Golden Palace tattoos on their bodies.

To get around advertising restrictions, some online poker companies advertise free-play sites, like PartyPoker.net and PokerStars.net, and sometimes even call these free sites "poker schools". These sites restrict access to those of legal age, even though it is not required.

In Australia, the principal gaming agency TAB (Totalisator Agency Board) ran advertisements on TV during the 1990s, under the tagline "The Adrenaline Bet". Since then, the TAB has been restricted from all advertising on television and other media, but is still allowed to print race dividends in the newspapers.

In Europe, partial bans on advertising (for example, ads targeting children) are common. Several European countries, including Poland and Moldova, have banned gambling ads altogether.

From September 2007, the UK banned the advertising of around 1,000 gambling sites because they do not meet the guidelines dictated by the Department for Culture, Media and Sport.

Channel 4 Racing enjoyed a turnaround in its financial fortunes after UK law was changed to allow bookmakers to advertise directly on television; it now contains bookmakers' adverts placed within the programme, shortly before each race.

In 2018, the BBC found links to gambling websites on the sections of the websites of several football clubs.

Private media organizations can also ban gambling advertising, as the Guardian did in June 2023.

The Coalition against Gambling Ads, a UK network campaigning against gambling advertising promotion and sponsorship, has three main lines of argument: gambling advertising is harmful; regulations on gambling advertising don't work; and gambling advertising is ubiquitous.
