= SpudBros =

British baked potato business

- Type: Private
- Industry: Restaurant
- Genre: Food
- Founded: 28 September 2020
- Founder: Jacob Nelson; Harley Nelson
- Number of locations: 24 (2026)
- Area served: United Kingdom; United Arab Emirates
- Key people: Anthony Nelson
- Products: Baked potatoes
- Website: www.spudbrosexpress.com

SpudBros Express, or simply SpudBros, is a British food truck that primarily serves customizable baked potatoes. The company was founded in Preston, Lancashire, in 2020 by Jacob and Harley Nelson after they bought an old food truck. SpudBros has collaborated with several other brands like KFC and Preston North End F.C.. In 2025, they collaborated with EG On The Move to open stations in up to 160 EG On The Move stores.

== History ==
SpudBros Express was founded on 28 September 2020 by brothers Jacob and Harley Nelson in Preston, Lancashire, after the brothers bought an old food truck. The food truck was previously owned by Ernie Rhodes until he passed it down to Keith Roberts. They started making videos on TikTok during the second COVID-19 pandemic lockdown and built a fanbase, later expanding into London, Liverpool and Sheffield.

Their TikTok account was run by their father, Anthony Nelson, (Note: Also known as Tony) who they title the "Spudfather", gaining 60,000 followers. Harley dropped out of college in 2023 to help his father with what he called the "Hot Potato Tram". Jacob quit his job selling coconuts to join the business. In 2023, they rebranded to "SpudBros". In 2025, they announced an expansion in front of the Harris Museum. In June 2025, SpudBros partnered with KFC to create a limited-time baked potato, it was done in tribute to the original restaurant that was opened in 1965. SpudBros sponsored Preston North End F.C. on their shirts in June 2025.

In December 2025, they collaborated with EG On The Move to open stations in over 160 EG On The Move stores. Also in December 2025, they released a single with Vicky McClure to spread dementia awareness. In May 2026, they expanded across Scotland, and in August 2026, they signed a deal with a UAE hospitality firm to expand their operations to the United Arab Emirates. In November 2026, Charles III visited the food truck and tried their food; his choice was cheese and beans.

=== Trademark controversy ===
In late 2025, the SpudBros were in a dispute with another food truck for using the name "The Spud Father". In June 2025, they filed for a trademark of the name "The Spud Father" in honour of their father.
