= The NOCO Company =

Electronics company in the US

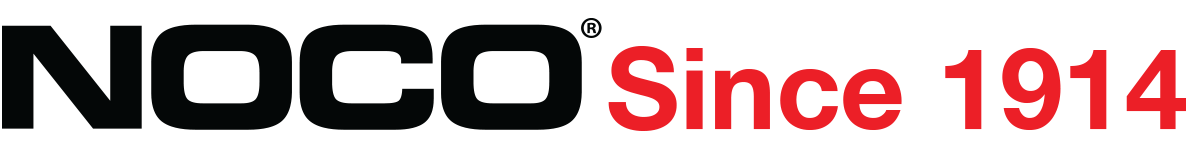
- Trade name: NOCO
- Type: Private
- Industry: Consumer electronics
- Founded: 1914; 112 years ago (as Nook & O'Neill)
- Founder: Joseph Henry Nook Sr.
- Headquarters: Glenwillow, Ohio, U.S.
- Area served: Worldwide
- Key people: William Nook (Chairman & CEO), Jonathan Nook (CVO & President)
- Products: NOCO; NOCO Genius; NOCO XGrid; NOCO Element; ChargeLight; BatteryLife; NCP2
- Revenue: $53.67 million (2015)
- Number of employees: 500 (2016)
- Website: no.co

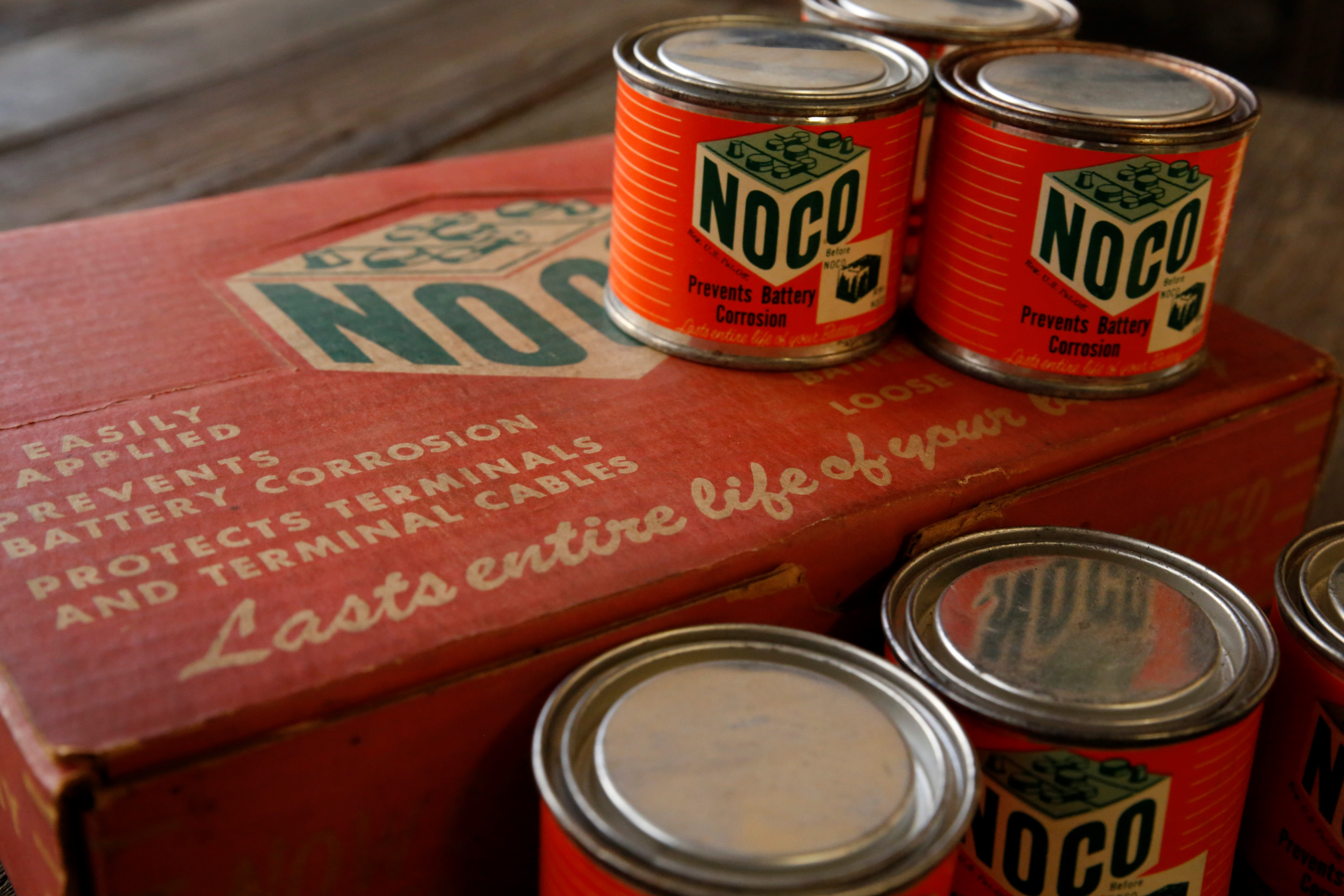
NOCO Company original battery corrosion formula, circa 1920s.

The NOCO Company (commonly referred to as NOCO) is an American privately held multinational corporation that designs, manufactures, and markets consumer electronics, automotive chemicals, plastics and various electrical components.

== Overview ==
NOCO was founded as Nook & O'Neill in 1914. Joseph Henry Nook Sr. was later inducted into the Automotive Hall of Fame. Their original catalog can still be found in various automotive museums and archives. NOCO holds over two dozen patents including a patent for portable vehicle battery jump start apparatus with safety protection.

== Acquisition ==
In 2009, NOCO acquired Advanced Fishing Technologies ("AFT)", a high-tech manufacturer of marine, industrial and photostatic battery management solutions.

== ChargeLight ==
NOCO's ChargeLight was first created from a fully funded Kickstarter campaign, which raised $121,329.

== Genius Boost family ==
The Genius Boost family of lithium jump starters is one of the company's most popular line of products. The GB30 car jump starter was rated 9/10 by TopSpeed and "Good" by Consumer Reports. Production is in Vietnam, Malaysia and China.
