= EFL Championship =

English association football league

- Organising body: English Football League
- Founded: 1892; 134 years ago (as Football League Second Division); 1992; 34 years ago as (Football League First Division); 2004; 22 years ago (as Football League Championship); 2016; 10 years ago (as EFL Championship)
- Country: England
- Other club from: Wales
- Confederation: UEFA
- Chairman: Rick Parry
- Chief Executive Officer: Trevor Birch
- Number of clubs: 24
- Level on pyramid: 2
- Promotion to: Premier League
- Relegation to: EFL League One
- Domestic cup: FA Cup
- League cup: EFL Cup
- International cups: UEFA Europa League (via FA Cup); UEFA Conference League (via EFL Cup)
- Current champions: Coventry City; 1st Championship title 2nd second tier title (2025–26)
- Most championships: Leicester City; (8 titles)
- Broadcaster(s): List of broadcasters
- Sponsor(s): Sky Bet
- Website: Official website
- Current: 2026–27 EFL Championship

The English Football League Championship is the highest division of the English Football League (EFL) and second-highest overall in the English football league system, sitting below the Premier League and contested by 24 professional clubs from England and Wales.

In its present form, the Championship traces its legacy to the original Football League Second Division, which became the First Division in 1992 when the top flight of English football was reorganised as the Premier League. The current competition was intended for the 2004–05 season as the Football League Championship as a rebrand of the First Division. The winning club of this division each season receives the EFL Championship trophy, which was the previous trophy awarded to the winners of the English top-flight prior to the launch of the Premier League. As with other divisions of professional English football, Welsh clubs can be part of this division, thus making it a cross-border league.

Each season, the two top-finishing teams in the Championship are automatically promoted to the Premier League. Up until the 2025/26 season the teams that finished the season in third to sixth place entered a play-off tournament, with the winner gaining promotion to the Premier League. From the 2026/27 season the playoffs also include the teams finishing in seventh and eighth place. The three lowest-finishing teams in the Championship are relegated to League One.

The Championship is the wealthiest non-top-flight football division in the world, the ninth-richest division in Europe, and the 12th best-attended division in world football (with the second highest per-match attendance of any secondary league – after the German 2. Bundesliga). Its average match attendance for the 2022–23 season was 18,787.

Cardiff City have spent more seasons in this division than any other team, and Bristol City, Preston North End and Queens Park Rangers currently hold the longest tenure in this division, having last been absent in the 2014–15 season. Barnsley became the first club to attain 1,000 wins in second-tier English league football with a 2–1 home victory over Coventry City on 3 January 2011. They also became the first club to play 3,000 games in second-level English league football following another 2–1 home victory, this time against Brighton & Hove Albion on 12 March 2013. The current champions of the league are Coventry City.

== History ==
The EFL Championship trophy

Sunderland won the league in the first season since rebranding, with Wigan Athletic finishing second to win promotion to the top flight of English football for the first time in their history. They had only been elected to the Football League in 1978 playing in the fourth tier as recently as 1994 before their promotion. West Ham United won the first Championship play-off final that season, following a 1–0 victory over Preston North End at the Millennium Stadium in Cardiff. The 2004–05 season saw the division announce a total attendance (including postseason) of 9.8 million, the fourth-highest total attendance for a European football division, behind the Premier League (12.88 million), Spain's La Liga (11.57 million) and Germany's Bundesliga (10.92 million). Additionally, Millwall, competing in the inaugural Championship season, qualified for the UEFA Cup, only to lose in the first round. In the 2005–06 season, Reading broke the Football League points record for a season, finishing with 106 points, exceeding the record of 105 set by Sunderland in 1998–99.

Sunderland won their second Championship title in the 2006–07 season, after being relegated from the top division the previous season. On 4 May 2007, Leeds United became the first side since the re-branding of the division to enter administration; they were deducted 10 points and were relegated as a result. On 28 May 2007, Derby County won the first Championship play-off final at the new Wembley Stadium, beating West Bromwich Albion 1–0. West Brom would go on to win the Championship in the following season.

Burnley, who finished fifth in 2009, defeated Sheffield United to earn their first season in the newly branded Premier League, last being in the Football League First Division in 1976.

Crystal Palace became the second Championship club to enter administration in 2010.

After winning the 2011 League Cup final, Birmingham City became the first Championship club to compete in the group stage of the UEFA Cup/Europa League, finishing third in the group, only one point behind Portuguese club Braga. Birmingham City eventually finished fourth in the Championship that season, and would lose to fifth-place Blackpool in the play-off. Wigan Athletic became the second club to participate in the Europa League group stage after winning the 2013 FA Cup, only to accumulate one win and lose their last three group matches.

On 24 May 2014, the Championship play-off final between Derby County and Queens Park Rangers saw the highest crowd for any Championship fixture – 87,348 witnessed a Bobby Zamora stoppage time winner for QPR to win promotion for the London club.

For the 2016–17 season, the Football League was rebranded as the English Football League. The league had a cumulative attendance of more than 11 million – excluding play-off matches – with more than two million watching Newcastle United and Aston Villa home fixtures alone, both of whom had been relegated from the Premier League in the previous season. This was included in the highest crowds for the second to fourth tier in England since the 1958–59 season. Newcastle won the title in 2016–17, while Aston Villa finished 13th, eventually returning to the Premier League in 2019.

On 13 March 2020, Championship play was halted due to the COVID-19 pandemic, with a suspension lasting until 4 April. It was then extended to the end of April, with the league eventually restarting on 20 June. Leeds United were confirmed as champions on 17 July 2020, being promoted to the Premier League for the first time in 16 years.

Brentford, having been in League Two in 2009 and gaining promotion to the Championship five years later, were promoted following a play-off victory against Swansea City on 29 May 2021, after losing the play-off to Fulham the previous year. On 29 May 2022, Nottingham Forest, having been in the Championship for 14 consecutive seasons, ended their 23-year absence from the top flight by beating Huddersfield Town in the play-off final, after being last in the league as late as round 8 of the 2021–22 season.

The EFL Championship took a unique four-week break in November and December 2022 to allow for players to join their national teams at the 2022 FIFA World Cup held in Qatar.

On 30 July 2026, Premier League clubs unanimously approved a proposed 10-year strategic partnership with the EFL, reportedly worth £1.5 billion. The Premier League also stated it already invests £1.6 billion every three years into the wider game and communities.

== League structure ==
The league comprises 24 teams. Over the course of a season, which runs annually from August to the following May (in 2022, the year of a World Cup break in November and December, the league started in July), each team plays twice against the others in the league, once at 'home' and once 'away', resulting in each team competing in 46 games in total. Three points are awarded for a win, one for a draw, and zero for a loss. The teams are ranked in the league table by points gained, then goal difference, then goals scored, and then their head-to-head record for that season (including away goals record). If two or more teams finish the season equal in all these respects, then teams are separated by alphabetical order, unless a promotion, relegation, or play-off place (see below) is at stake, when the teams are separated by a play-off game, though this improbable situation has never arisen in all the years the rule has existed.

== Clubs ==
=== Current members ===
Locations of the 2026–27 EFL Championship teams
Greater London 2026–27 EFL Championship teams

Team	Location	Stadium	Capacity
Birmingham City	Birmingham (Bordesley)	St Andrew's	29,409
Blackburn Rovers	Blackburn	Ewood Park	31,367
Bolton Wanderers	Bolton (Horwich)	Toughsheet Community Stadium	28,723
Bristol City	Bristol	Ashton Gate	26,462
Burnley	Burnley	Turf Moor	21,990
Cardiff City	Cardiff	Cardiff City Stadium	33,280
Charlton Athletic	London (Charlton)	The Valley	27,111
Derby County	Derby	Pride Park Stadium	33,597
Lincoln City	Lincoln	Sincil Bank	10,669
Middlesbrough	Middlesbrough	Riverside Stadium	34,742
Millwall	London (Bermondsey)	The Den	20,146
Norwich City	Norwich	Carrow Road	27,359
Portsmouth	Portsmouth (Milton)	Fratton Park	20,867
Preston North End	Preston	Deepdale	23,408
Queens Park Rangers	London (Shepherd's Bush)	Loftus Road	18,439
Sheffield United	Sheffield (Highfield)	Bramall Lane	32,050
Southampton	Southampton	St Mary's Stadium	32,384
Stoke City	Stoke-on-Trent	bet365 Stadium	30,089
Swansea City	Swansea	Swansea.com Stadium	21,088
Watford	Watford	Vicarage Road	22,200
West Bromwich Albion	West Bromwich	The Hawthorns	26,850
West Ham United	London (Stratford)	London Stadium	62,500
Wolverhampton Wanderers	Wolverhampton	Molineux Stadium	31,750
Wrexham	Wrexham	Racecourse Ground	10,771

=== Seasons in English second tier ===
There are 106 teams that have taken part in 123 English second tier seasons (including the Football League Second Division, the Football League First Division, and the EFL Championship) that were played from the 1892–93 season until the 2026–27 season. The teams in bold compete in the EFL Championship currently, while the teams in italics have never competed in the EFL Championship. The year in parentheses represents the most recent year of participation at this level.

- **78** seasons: Barnsley (2022)
- **65** seasons: Hull City (2026)
- **64** seasons: Leicester City (2026)
- **62** seasons: **Birmingham City** (2027)
- **59** seasons: **Bristol City** (2027)
- **58** seasons: Nottingham Forest (2022)
- **57** seasons: **Derby County** (2027)
- **56** seasons: Fulham (2022)
- **54** seasons: **Middlesbrough** (2027), **Preston North End** (2027)
- **53** seasons: **Cardiff City** (2027)
- **52** seasons: Grimsby Town (2003), Blackpool (2023)
- **51** seasons: **Wolverhampton Wanderers** (2027)
- **50** seasons: **Blackburn Rovers** (2027), **Millwall** (2027), **Stoke City** (2027)
- **49** seasons: **Burnley** (2027), **Sheffield United** (2027)
- **48** seasons: **Charlton Athletic** (2027)
- **46** seasons: Sheffield Wednesday (2026), **Swansea City** (2027)
- **45** seasons: **West Bromwich Albion** (2027)
- **44** seasons: **Norwich City** (2027)
- **43** seasons: Huddersfield Town (2024), **Portsmouth** (2027)
- **42** seasons: Leeds United (2025), Plymouth Argyle (2025)
- **41** seasons: Leyton Orient (1982), Port Vale (2000), **Southampton** (2027)
- **39** seasons: Bury (1999), Luton Town (2025), Ipswich Town (2026)
- **38** seasons: **Queens Park Rangers** (2027)
- **37** seasons: Notts County (1995), Crystal Palace (2013)
- **36** seasons: Oldham Athletic (1997)
- **35** seasons: Coventry City (2026), **Bolton Wanderers** (2027), **Lincoln City** (2027), **Watford** (2027)
- **33** seasons: Sunderland (2025), **West Ham United** (2027)
- **30** seasons: Rotherham United (2024)
- **29** seasons: Bradford City (2004), Reading (2023)
- **28** seasons: Newcastle United (2017)
- **26** seasons: Stockport County (2002)
- **25** seasons: Manchester City (2002)
- **24** seasons: Brighton & Hove Albion (2017)
- **22** seasons: Bradford (Park Avenue) (1950), Manchester United (1975)
- **20** seasons: Chesterfield (1951), Oxford United (2026)
- **19** seasons: Chelsea (1989), Bristol Rovers (1993), Doncaster Rovers (2014)
- **18** seasons: Swindon Town (2000)
- **17** seasons: Brentford (2021)
- **16** seasons: Gainsborough Trinity (1912), Glossop North End (1915), Tottenham Hotspur (1978)
- **15** seasons: Carlisle United (1986), Walsall (2004)
- **13** seasons: Arsenal (1915), Aston Villa (2019)
- **12** seasons: Crewe Alexandra (2006)
- **11** seasons: Liverpool (1962), Tranmere Rovers (2001)
- **10** seasons: Leeds City (1915), Shrewsbury Town (1989)
- **9** seasons: Burton Swifts (1901), Gateshead (1928), Scunthorpe United (2011)
- **8** seasons: Cambridge United (1993), Wigan Athletic (2023)
- **7** seasons: Southend United (2007), Bournemouth (2022)
- **6** seasons: Darwen (1899), Burton United (1907), Wimbledon (2004), Peterborough United (2022), **Wrexham** (2027)
- **5** seasons: Loughborough (1900), Gillingham (2005)
- **4** seasons: Rotherham County (1923), Everton (1954)
- **3** seasons: Rotherham Town (1896), Burton Wanderers (1897), New Brighton Tower (1901), Northampton Town (1967)
- **2** seasons: Northwich Victoria (1894), Darlington (1927), York City (1976), Colchester United (2008), Burton Albion (2018)
- **1** season: Bootle (1893), Middlesbrough Ironopolis (1894), Nelson (1924), Newport County (1947), Hereford United (1977), Mansfield Town (1978), Yeovil Town (2014), Milton Keynes Dons (2016), Wycombe Wanderers (2021)

=== Seasons in EFL Championship ===
There are 59 teams that have taken part in 23 English second tier seasons that were played from the 2004–05 season until the 2026–27 season. The teams in bold compete in the EFL Championship currently. The year in parentheses represents the most recent year of participation at this level.

- **20** seasons: **Cardiff City** (2027), **Derby County** (2027), **Queens Park Rangers** (2027)
- **19** seasons: **Preston North End** (2027)
- **18** seasons: **Bristol City** (2027)
- **17** seasons: Ipswich Town (2026), Sheffield Wednesday (2026), **Birmingham City** (2027), **Middlesbrough** (2027), **Millwall** (2027)
- **16** seasons: Reading (2023), **Watford** (2027)
- **15** seasons: Nottingham Forest (2022), Leeds United (2025), Hull City (2026), **Norwich City** (2027)
- **14** seasons: Coventry City (2026), **Blackburn Rovers** (2027)
- **13** seasons: Barnsley (2022), **Burnley** (2027), **Sheffield United** (2027), **Stoke City** (2027)
- **12** seasons: **Swansea City** (2027)
- **11** seasons: Leicester City (2026), **West Bromwich Albion** (2027), **Wolverhampton Wanderers** (2027)
- **10** seasons: Huddersfield Town (2024)
- **9** seasons: Blackpool (2023), **Charlton Athletic** (2027)
- **8** seasons: Crystal Palace (2013), Brighton & Hove Albion (2017), Rotherham United (2024), Plymouth Argyle (2025), **Southampton** (2027)
- **7** seasons: Brentford (2021), Wigan Athletic (2023), Luton Town (2025), **Bolton Wanderers** (2027)
- **6** seasons: Fulham (2022), Sunderland (2025)
- **5** seasons: Doncaster Rovers (2014), **Portsmouth** (2027)
- **4** seasons: Bournemouth (2022), Peterborough United (2022)
- **3** seasons: Scunthorpe United (2011), Aston Villa (2019), **West Ham United** (2027)
- **2** seasons: Crewe Alexandra (2006), Colchester United (2008), Newcastle United (2017), Burton Albion (2018), Oxford United (2026), **Wrexham** (2027)
- **1** season: Gillingham (2005), Southend United (2007), Yeovil Town (2014), Milton Keynes Dons (2016), Wycombe Wanderers (2021), **Lincoln City** (2027)

== Results ==
=== League champions, runners-up and play-off finalists ===
Season	Champions	Runners-up	Play-off winners	Score	Play-off runners-up
2004–05	Sunderland 94	Wigan Athletic 87	West Ham United 73 (6th)	1–0	Preston North End 75 (5th)
2005–06	Reading 106	Sheffield United 90	Watford 81 (3rd)	3–0	Leeds United 78 (5th)
2006–07	Sunderland 88	Birmingham City 86	Derby County 84 (3rd)	1–0	West Bromwich Albion 76 (4th)
2007–08	West Bromwich Albion 81	Stoke City 79	Hull City 75 (3rd)	1–0	Bristol City 74 (4th)
2008–09	Wolverhampton Wanderers 90	Birmingham City 83	Burnley 76 (5th)	1–0	Sheffield United 80 (3rd)
2009–10	Newcastle United 102	West Bromwich Albion 91	Blackpool 70 (6th)	3–2	Cardiff City 76 (4th)
2010–11	Queens Park Rangers 88	Norwich City^{1} 84	Swansea City 80 (3rd)	4–2	Reading 77 (5th)
2011–12	Reading 89	Southampton 88	West Ham United 86 (3rd)	2–1	Blackpool 75 (5th)
2012–13	Cardiff City 87	Hull City 79	Crystal Palace 72 (5th)	1–0 (a.e.t.)	Watford 77 (3rd)
2013–14	Leicester City 102	Burnley 93	Queens Park Rangers 80 (4th)	1–0	Derby County 85 (3rd)
2014–15	Bournemouth 90	Watford 89	Norwich City 86 (3rd)	2–0	Middlesbrough 85 (4th)
2015–16	Burnley 93	Middlesbrough 89	Hull City 83 (4th)	1–0	Sheffield Wednesday 74 (6th)
2016–17	Newcastle United 94	Brighton & Hove Albion 93	Huddersfield Town 81 (5th)	0–0 (4–3 pen.)	Reading 85 (3rd)
2017–18	Wolverhampton Wanderers 99	Cardiff City 90	Fulham 88 (3rd)	1–0	Aston Villa 83 (4th)
2018–19	Norwich City 94	Sheffield United 89	Aston Villa 76 (5th)	2–1	Derby County 74 (6th)
2019–20	Leeds United 93	West Bromwich Albion 83	Fulham 81 (4th)	2–1 (a.e.t.)	Brentford 81 (3rd)
2020–21	Norwich City 97	Watford 91	Brentford 87 (3rd)	2–0	Swansea City 80 (4th)
2021–22	Fulham 90	Bournemouth 88	Nottingham Forest 80 (4th)	1–0	Huddersfield Town 82 (3rd)
2022–23	Burnley 101	Sheffield United 91	Luton Town 80 (3rd)	1–1 (6–5 pen.)	Coventry City 70 (5th)
2023–24	Leicester City 97	Ipswich Town 96	Southampton 87 (4th)	1–0	Leeds United 90 (3rd)
2024–25	Leeds United 100	Burnley^{2} 100	Sunderland 76 (4th)	2–1	Sheffield United 90 (3rd)
2025–26	Coventry City 95	Ipswich Town 84	Hull City 73 (6th)	1–0	Middlesbrough 80 (5th)

^{1} When Norwich City gained promotion to the Premier League they were the first team to be relegated to, relegated from, promoted to and promoted from the Championship.
^{2} When Burnley were promoted with 100 points they set a record for the most points for a second-placed team; beating the previous record of 96 points by Ipswich Town.

For past winners at this level before 2004, see List of winners of English Football League Championship and predecessors

=== Relegated teams (from Championship to League One) ===
Season	Clubs (Points)
2004–05	Gillingham (50), Nottingham Forest (44), Rotherham United (29)
2005–06	Crewe Alexandra (42), Millwall (40), Brighton & Hove Albion (38)
2006–07	Southend United (42), Luton Town (40), Leeds United (36)
2007–08	Leicester City (52), Scunthorpe United (46), Colchester United (38)
2008–09	Norwich City (46), Southampton (45), Charlton Athletic (39)
2009–10	Sheffield Wednesday (47), Plymouth Argyle (41), Peterborough United (34)
2010–11	Preston North End (42), Sheffield United (42), Scunthorpe United (42)
2011–12	Portsmouth (40), Coventry City (40), Doncaster Rovers (36)
2012–13	Peterborough United (54), Wolverhampton Wanderers (51), Bristol City (41)
2013–14	Doncaster Rovers (44), Barnsley (39), Yeovil Town (37)
2014–15	Millwall (41), Wigan Athletic (39), Blackpool (26)
2015–16	Charlton Athletic (40), Milton Keynes Dons (39), Bolton Wanderers (30)
2016–17	Blackburn Rovers (51), Wigan Athletic (42), Rotherham United (23)
2017–18	Barnsley (41), Burton Albion (41), Sunderland (37)
2018–19	Rotherham United (40), Bolton Wanderers (32), Ipswich Town (31)
2019–20	Charlton Athletic (48), Wigan Athletic (47), Hull City (45)
2020–21	Wycombe Wanderers (43), Rotherham United (42), Sheffield Wednesday (41)
2021–22	Peterborough United (37), Derby County (34), Barnsley (30)
2022–23	Reading (44), Blackpool (44), Wigan Athletic (42)
2023–24	Birmingham City (50), Huddersfield Town (45), Rotherham United (27)
2024–25	Luton Town (49), Plymouth Argyle (46), Cardiff City (44)
2025–26	Oxford United (47), Leicester City (46), Sheffield Wednesday (0)

=== Relegated teams (from Premier League to Championship) ===
Season	Clubs (Points)
2004–05	Crystal Palace (33), Norwich City (33), Southampton (32)
2005–06	Birmingham City (34), West Bromwich Albion (30), Sunderland (15)
2006–07	Sheffield United (38), Charlton Athletic (34), Watford (29)
2007–08	Reading (36), Birmingham City (35), Derby County (11)
2008–09	Newcastle United (34), Middlesbrough (32), West Bromwich Albion (32)
2009–10	Burnley (30), Hull City (30), Portsmouth (19)
2010–11	Birmingham City (39), Blackpool (39), West Ham United (33)
2011–12	Bolton Wanderers (36), Blackburn Rovers (31), Wolverhampton Wanderers (25)
2012–13	Wigan Athletic (36), Reading (28), Queens Park Rangers (25)
2013–14	Norwich City (33), Fulham (32), Cardiff City (30)
2014–15	Hull City (35), Burnley (33), Queens Park Rangers (30)
2015–16	Newcastle United (37), Norwich City (34), Aston Villa (17)
2016–17	Hull City (34), Middlesbrough (28), Sunderland (24)
2017–18	Swansea City (33), Stoke City (33), West Bromwich Albion (31)
2018–19	Cardiff City (34), Fulham (26), Huddersfield Town (16)
2019–20	Bournemouth (34), Watford (34), Norwich City (21)
2020–21	Fulham (28), West Bromwich Albion (26), Sheffield United (23)
2021–22	Burnley (35), Watford (23), Norwich City (22)
2022–23	Leicester City (34), Leeds United (31), Southampton (25)
2023–24	Luton Town (26), Burnley (24), Sheffield United (16)
2024–25	Leicester City (25), Ipswich Town (22), Southampton (12)
2025–26	West Ham United (39), Burnley (22), Wolverhampton Wanderers (20)

=== Promoted teams (from League One to Championship) ===
Season	Clubs (Points)
2004–05	Luton Town (98), Hull City (86), Sheffield Wednesday (Play-off winners) (72)
2005–06	Southend United (82), Colchester United (79), Barnsley (Play-off winners) (72)
2006–07	Scunthorpe United (91), Bristol City (85), Blackpool (Play-off winners) (83)
2007–08	Swansea City (91), Nottingham Forest (82), Doncaster Rovers (Play-off winners) (80)
2008–09	Leicester City (96), Peterborough United (89), Scunthorpe United (Play-off winners) (76)
2009–10	Norwich City (95), Leeds United (86), Millwall (Play-off winners) (85)
2010–11	Brighton & Hove Albion (95), Southampton (92), Peterborough United (Play-off winners) (79)
2011–12	Charlton Athletic (101), Sheffield Wednesday (93), Huddersfield Town (Play-off winners) (81)
2012–13	Doncaster Rovers (84), Bournemouth (83), Yeovil Town (Play-off winners) (77)
2013–14	Wolverhampton Wanderers (103), Brentford (94), Rotherham United (Play-off winners) (86)
2014–15	Bristol City (99), Milton Keynes Dons (91), Preston North End (Play-off winners) (89)
2015–16	Wigan Athletic (87), Burton Albion (85), Barnsley (Play-off winners) (74)
2016–17	Sheffield United (100), Bolton Wanderers (87), Millwall (Play-off winners) (73)
2017–18	Wigan Athletic (98), Blackburn Rovers (96), Rotherham United (Play-off winners) (79)
2018–19	Luton Town (94), Barnsley (91), Charlton Athletic (Play-off winners) (88)
2019–20	Coventry City (88.71), Rotherham United (77.94), Wycombe Wanderers (Play-off winners) (76.35)
2020–21	Hull City (89), Peterborough United (87), Blackpool (Play-off winners) (80)
2021–22	Wigan Athletic (92), Rotherham United (90), Sunderland (Play-off winners) (84)
2022–23	Plymouth Argyle (101), Ipswich Town (98), Sheffield Wednesday (Play-off winners) (96)
2023–24	Portsmouth (97), Derby County (92), Oxford United (Play-off winners) (77)
2024–25	Birmingham City (111), Wrexham (92), Charlton Athletic (Play-off winners) (84)
2025–26	Lincoln City (103), Cardiff City (91), Bolton Wanderers (Play-off winners) (75)

== Top scorers ==
Season	Top scorer(s)	Club(s)	Goals
2004–05	(England) Nathan Ellington	Wigan Athletic	24
2005–06	(Jamaica) Marlon King	Watford	21
2006–07	(England) Jamie Cureton	Colchester United	23
2007–08	(England) Sylvan Ebanks-Blake	Plymouth Argyle; Wolverhampton Wanderers	23
2008–09	(England) Sylvan Ebanks-Blake	Wolverhampton Wanderers	25
2009–10	(England) Peter Whittingham	Cardiff City	20
2009–10	(England) Nicky Maynard	Bristol City	20
2010–11	(England) Danny Graham	Watford	24
2011–12	(England) Rickie Lambert	Southampton	27
2012–13	(England) Glenn Murray	Crystal Palace	30
2013–14	(Scotland) Ross McCormack	Leeds United	28
2014–15	(Republic of Ireland) Daryl Murphy	Ipswich Town	27
2015–16	(England) Andre Gray	Brentford; Burnley	25
2016–17	(New Zealand) Chris Wood	Leeds United	27
2017–18	(Czech Republic) Matěj Vydra	Derby County	21
2018–19	(Finland) Teemu Pukki	Norwich City	29
2019–20	(Serbia) Aleksandar Mitrović	Fulham	26
2020–21	(England) Ivan Toney	Brentford	31
2021–22	(Serbia) Aleksandar Mitrović	Fulham	43
2022–23	(England) Chuba Akpom	Middlesbrough	28
2023–24	(Republic of Ireland) Sammie Szmodics	Blackburn Rovers	27
2024–25	(Suriname) Joël Piroe	Leeds United	19
2025–26	(Slovenia) Žan Vipotnik	Swansea City	23

== Attendances ==
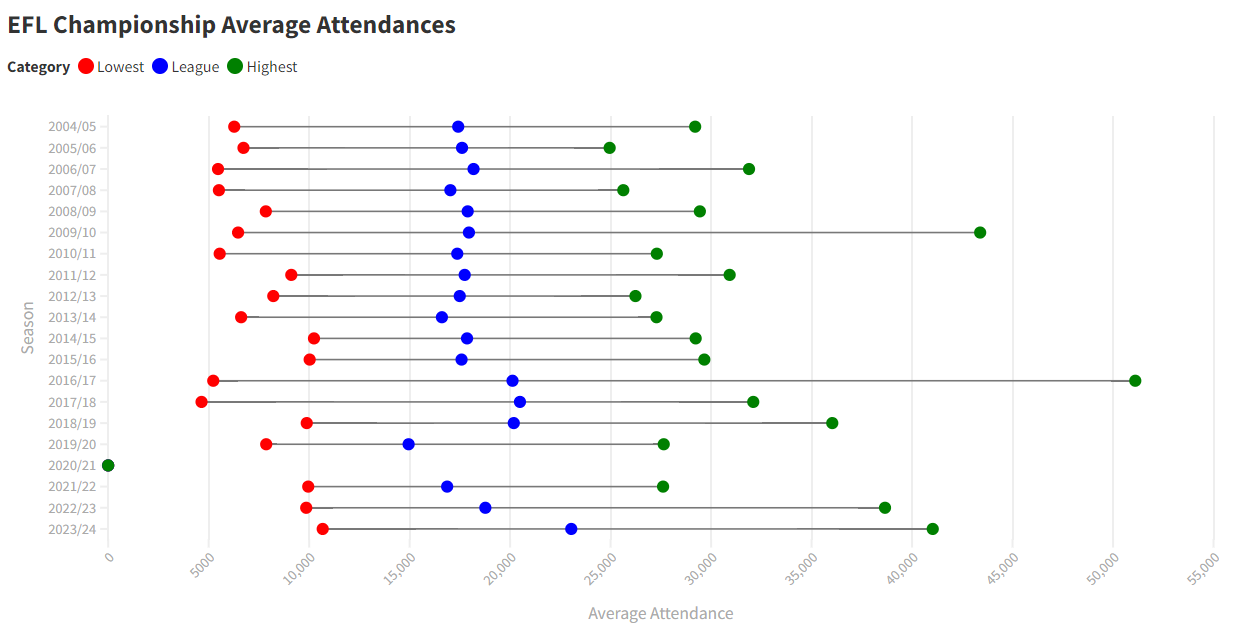

The EFL Championship is the second most-watched second-tier domestic sports league in the World, behind the German 2. Bundesliga (29,081), with an average of 23,048 spectators per game in the 2023–24 season. The Championship is the fifth most watched league in Europe.

The highest average league attendance was in 2023–24 season, when 12.7 million fans attended Championship matches, at an average of 23,048 per game. The lowest average league attendance came in the 2013–14 season, when 9.1 million spectators watched at an average of 16,605 per game. The highest seasonal average for a club was 51,106 for Newcastle United in the 2016–17 season.

Season	League average attendance	Highest average	
Season	League average attendance	Club	Attendance
2004–05	17,417	Leeds United	29,207
2005–06	17,607	Norwich City	24,952
2006–07	18,179	Sunderland	31,887
2007–08	17,027	Sheffield United	25,631
2008–09	17,888	Derby County	29,440
2009–10	17,949	Newcastle United	43,388
2010–11	17,369	Leeds United (2)	27,299
2011–12	17,739	West Ham United	30,923
2012–13	17,493	Brighton & Hove Albion	26,236
2013–14	16,605	Brighton & Hove Albion (2)	27,283
2014–15	17,857	Derby County (2)	29,232
2015–16	17,583	Derby County (3)	29,663
2016–17	20,119	Newcastle United (2)	51,106
2017–18	20,489	Aston Villa	32,097
2018–19	20,269	Aston Villa (2)	36,029
2019–20	18,585	Leeds United (3)	27,643
2020–21	No attendances due to COVID-19 pandemic		
2021–22	16,776	Sheffield United (2)	27,611
2022–23	18,787	Sunderland (2)	38,653
2023–24	23,048	Sunderland (3)	41,158
2024–25	22,057	Sunderland (4)	40,425
2025–26	22,113	Coventry City	30,290

== Historic performance ==
Since the restructuring into the Championship in 2004, 57 teams have spent at least one season in the division, including 13 of the 20 teams in the 2026–27 Premier League. Cardiff City, Derby County and Queens Park Rangers have spent the longest in the league with 20 seasons. The 15-season spell for Ipswich Town between 2004 and 2019 is the longest consecutive spell of any team in the division. The teams with the current longest tenure are Bristol City, Preston North End and Queens Park Rangers, who each have their twelfth consecutive season as a Championship team in the 2026–27 season. Burnley and Norwich City have both had six separate spells in the Championship; the most of any team. There have been 13 different winners of the EFL Championship, with eight teams (Burnley, Leeds United, Leicester City, Newcastle United, Norwich City, Reading, Sunderland and Wolverhampton Wanderers) having won it twice.

Burnley, Hull City and Norwich City have been promoted out of the Championship on four occasions, with four teams (Fulham, Sheffield United, Watford, West Brom) having been promoted on three occasions. Rotherham United have been relegated from the Championship the most times on five occasions, with Wigan Athletic having been relegated the second-most times on four occasions and three teams (Barnsley, Charlton Athletic and Sheffield Wednesday) having been relegated on three occasions. Fourteen teams have been both promoted out of and relegated from the Championship.

Key

- † Teams with this background and symbol in the "Club" column will be competing in the 2026–27 EFL Championship
- ‡ Team will be competing in the 2026–27 Premier League
- The club competed in the EFL Championship during that season (the number is the club's final league position)

Club	Total Seasons	Number of Spells	Longest Spell (Seasons)	Highest Position	Lowest Position	Season																															
Club	Total Seasons	Number of Spells	Longest Spell (Seasons)	Highest Position	Lowest Position	2004–05	2005–06	2006–07	2007–08	2008–09	2009–10	2010–11	2011–12	2012–13	2013–14	2014–15	2015–16	2016–17	2017–18	2018–19	2019–20	2020–21	2021–22	2022–23	2023–24	2024–25	2025–26	2026–27									
Club	Total Seasons	Number of Spells	Longest Spell (Seasons)	Highest Position	Lowest Position	2004–05	2005–06	2006–07	2007–08	2008–09	2009–10	2010–11	2011–12	2012–13	2013–14	2014–15	2015–16	2016–17	2017–18	2018–19	2019–20	2020–21	2021–22	2022–23	2023–24	2024–25	2025–26	2026–27	Aston Villa ‡	3	1	3	4	13	13	4	5
Barnsley	13	3	8	5	24			20	18	20	18	17	21	21	23			14	22		21	5	24														
Birmingham City †	17	4	13	2	22			2		2			4	12	21	10	10	19	19	17	20	18	20	17	22		10										
Blackburn Rovers †	14	2	9	7	22									17	8	9	15	22		15	11	15	8	7	19	7	20										
Blackpool	9	3	4	5	24				19	16	6		5	15	20	24							16	23													
Bolton Wanderers †	7	3	4	7	24									7	14	18	24		21	23																	
Bournemouth ‡	4	2	2	1	10										10	1						6	2														
Brentford ‡	7	1	7	3	11											5	9	10	9	11	3	3															
Brighton & Hove Albion ‡	8	2	6	2	24	20	24						10	4	6	20	3	2																			
Bristol City †	18	2	12	4	24				4	10	10	15	20	24			18	17	11	8	12	19	17	14	11	6	12										
Burnley †	13	6	5	1	17	13	17	15	13	5		8	13	11	2		1							1		2											
Burton Albion	2	1	2	20	23													20	23																		
Cardiff City †	20	4	9	1	24	16	11	13	12	7	4	4	6	1		11	8	12	2		5	8	18	21	12	24											
Charlton Athletic †	9	4	4	9	24				11	24				9	18	12	22				22						19										
Colchester United	2	1	2	10	24			10	24																												
Coventry City ‡	14	2	8	1	23	19	8	17	21	17	19	18	23									16	12	5	9	5	1										
Crewe Alexandra	2	1	2	21	22	21	22																														
Crystal Palace ‡	8	1	8	5	21		6	12	5	15	21	20	17	5																							
Derby County †	20	3	14	3	23	4	20	3		18	14	19	12	10	3	8	5	9	6	6	10	21	23			19	8										
Doncaster Rovers	5	2	4	12	24					14	12	21	24		22																						
Fulham ‡	6	3	4	1	20											17	20	6	3		4		1														
Gillingham	1	1	1	22	22	22																															
Huddersfield Town	10	2	5	3	23									19	17	16	19	5			18	20	3	18	23												
Hull City ‡	15	5	5	2	24		18	21	3			11	8	2			4		18	13	24		19	15	7	21	6										
Ipswich Town ‡	17	3	15	2	24	3	15	14	8	9	15	13	15	14	9	6	7	16	12	24					2		2										
Leeds United ‡	15	3	10	1	24	14	5	24				7	14	13	15	15	13	7	13	3	1				3	1											
Leicester City	11	4	5	1	23	15	16	19	22		5	10	9	6	1										1		23										
Lincoln City †	1	1	1																																		
Luton Town	7	3	4	3	23		10	23													19	12	6	3		22											
Middlesbrough †	17	2	10	2	17						11	12	7	16	12	4	2		5	7	17	10	7	4	8	10	5										
Millwall †	17	3	10	3	23	10	23					9	16	20	19	22			8	21	8	11	9	8	13	8	3										
Milton Keynes Dons	1	1	1	23	23												23																				
Newcastle United ‡	2	2	1	1	1						1							1																			
Norwich City †	15	6	5	1	22		9	16	17	22		2				3		8	14	1		1		13	6	13	9										
Nottingham Forest ‡	15	2	14	3	23	23				19	3	6	19	8	11	14	16	21	17	9	7	17	4														
Oxford United	2	1	2	17	22																					17	22										
Peterborough United	4	3	2	18	24						24		18	22									22														
Plymouth Argyle	8	2	6	10	23	17	14	11	10	21	23														21	23											
Portsmouth †	5	2	3	16	22							16	22													16	18										
Preston North End †	19	2	12	4	22	5	4	7	15	6	17	22					11	11	7	14	9	13	13	12	10	20	14										
Queens Park Rangers †	20	3	12	1	21	11	21	18	14	11	13	1			4		12	18	16	19	13	9	11	20	18	15	15										
Reading	16	3	10	1	22	7	1			4	9	5	1		7	19	17	3	20	20	14	7	21	22													
Rotherham United	8	5	3	19	24	24										21	21	24		22		23		19	24												
Scunthorpe United	3	2	2	20	24				23		20	24																									
Sheffield United †	13	5	4	2	23	8	2		9	3	8	23							10	2			5	2		3	13										
Sheffield Wednesday	17	3	9	4	24		19	9	16	12	22			18	16	13	6	4	15	12	16	24			20	12	24										
Southampton †	8	4	4	2	23		12	6	20	23			2												4		4										
Southend United	1	1	1	22	22			22																													
Stoke City †	13	2	9	2	18	12	13	8	2											16	15	14	14	16	17	18	17										
Sunderland ‡	6	4	3	1	24	1		1											24					6	16	4											
Swansea City †	12	2	9	3	15					8	7	3								10	6	4	15	10	14	11	11										
Watford †	16	4	8	2	18	18	3		6	13	16	14	11	3	13	2						2		11	15	14	16										
West Bromwich Albion †	11	4	7	1	21			4	1		2									4	2		10	9	5	9	21										
West Ham United †	3	3	1	3	6	6							3																								
Wigan Athletic	7	5	2	2	24	2									5	23		23		18	23			24													
Wolverhampton Wanderers †	11	4	5	1	23	9	7	5	7	1				23		7	14	15	1																		
Wrexham †	2	1	2	7	7																						7										
Wycombe Wanderers	1	1	1	22	22																	22															
Yeovil Town	1	1	1	24	24										24																						

== Sponsorships ==
On 30 September 2009, Coca-Cola announced they would end their sponsorship deal with the Football League, which began in 2004, at the end of the 2009–10 season. On 16 March 2010, npower were announced as the new title sponsors of the Football League, and from the start of the 2010–11 Football League season until the end of the 2012–13 season, the Football League Championship was known as the Npower Championship. In 2013, UK bookmaker Sky Bet signed a five-year agreement to sponsor the league, and have remained the sponsor since then.

== See also ==
- English football league system
- EFL Championship Manager of the Month
- List of English football club owners
- List of attendance figures at domestic professional sports leagues – Championship attendance in a worldwide context
- List of professional sports teams in the United Kingdom
