= List of EFL Championship managers =

The EFL Championship is a professional football league in England which is the second tier of the English football league system.

Some of the people have served spells as caretaker (temporary) managers in the period between a managerial departure and appointment.

An asterisk (*) indicates that the manager is currently managing the EFL Championship club his name is next to.

== List of managers by club ==
The dates of appointment and departure may fall outside the club's period in the EFL Championship.

Key
†	Incumbent manager
‡	Caretaker manager
§	Incumbent but no longer in EFL Championship
*	Present up to date as of 8 November 2026

Name	Nat.	Championship club	From	Until	Years in EFLC	Ref.
Roberto Di Matteo	(Italy)	Aston Villa	2 June 2016	3 October 2016	2016	
Steve Bruce	(England)	Aston Villa	12 October 2016	3 October 2018	2016–2018	
Kevin MacDonald ‡	(Scotland)	Aston Villa	3 October 2018	10 October 2018	2018	
Dean Smith	(England)	Aston Villa	10 October 2018	7 November 2021	2018–2019	
Andy Ritchie	(England)	Barnsley	13 May 2005	21 November 2006	2006	
Simon Davey	(Wales)	Barnsley	22 November 2006	29 August 2009	2006–2009	
Mark Robins	(England)	Barnsley	9 September 2009	15 May 2011	2009–2011	
Keith Hill	(England)	Barnsley	1 June 2011	29 December 2012	2011–2012	
David Flitcroft	(England)	Barnsley	30 December 2012 (Note: Flitcroft served as caretaker manager until 13 January 2013, when he was given a long term appointment.)	30 November 2013	2012–2013	
Danny Wilson	(Northern Ireland)	Barnsley	17 December 2013	12 February 2015	2013–2014	
Paul Heckingbottom	(England)	Barnsley	6 February 2016 (Note: Heckingbottom served as caretaker manager until 15 June 2016, when he was given a long term appointment.)	6 February 2018	2016–2018	
Paul Harsley ‡	(England)	Barnsley	6 February 2018	16 February 2018	2018	
José Morais	(Portugal)	Barnsley	16 February 2018	6 May 2018	2018	
Daniel Stendel	(Germany)	Barnsley	6 June 2018	8 October 2019	2019	
Adam Murray ‡	(England)	Barnsley	8 October 2019	20 November 2019	2019	
Gerhard Struber	(Austria)	Barnsley	20 November 2019	6 October 2020	2019–2020	
Adam Murray ‡	(England)	Barnsley	6 October 2020	23 October 2020	2020	
Valérien Ismaël	(France)	Barnsley	23 October 2020	24 June 2021	2020–2021	
Markus Schopp	(Austria)	Barnsley	29 June 2021	1 November 2021	2021	
Joseph Laumann ‡	(Germany)	Barnsley	1 November 2021	17 November 2021	2021	
Poya Asbaghi	(Sweden)	Barnsley	17 November 2021	24 April 2022	2021–2022	
Martin Devaney ‡	(Republic of Ireland)	Barnsley	24 April 2022	15 June 2022	2022	
Steve Bruce	(England)	Birmingham City	12 December 2001	19 November 2007	2006–2007	
Alex McLeish	(Scotland)	Birmingham City	28 November 2007	12 June 2011	2008–2009	
Chris Hughton	(Republic of Ireland)	Birmingham City	22 June 2011	4 June 2012	2011–2012	
Lee Clark	(England)	Birmingham City	27 June 2012	20 October 2014	2012–2014	
Richard Beale ‡	(England)	Birmingham City	20 October 2014	27 October 2014	2014	
Malcolm Crosby ‡	(England)	Birmingham City	20 October 2014	27 October 2014	2014	
Gary Rowett	(England)	Birmingham City	27 October 2014	14 December 2016	2014–2016	
Gianfranco Zola	(Italy)	Birmingham City	14 December 2016	17 April 2017	2016–2017	
Harry Redknapp	(England)	Birmingham City	18 April 2017	16 September 2017	2017	
Lee Carsley ‡	(Republic of Ireland)	Birmingham City	16 September 2017	29 September 2017	2017	
Steve Cotterill	(England)	Birmingham City	29 September 2017	3 March 2018	2017–2018	
Garry Monk	(England)	Birmingham City	4 March 2018	18 June 2019	2018–2019	
Pep Clotet	(Spain)	Birmingham City	18 June 2019 (Note: Clotet served as caretaker manager until 4 December 2019, when he was given a long term appointment.)	8 July 2020	2019–2020	
Craig Gardner ‡	(England)	Birmingham City	8 July 2020	31 July 2020	2020	
Aitor Karanka	(Spain)	Birmingham City	31 July 2020	16 March 2021	2020–2021	
Lee Bowyer	(England)	Birmingham City	16 March 2021	2 July 2022	2021–2022	
John Eustace	(England)	Birmingham City	3 July 2022	9 October 2023	2022–2023	
Wayne Rooney	(England)	Birmingham City	11 October 2023	2 January 2024	2023–2024	
Steve Spooner ‡	(England)	Birmingham City	2 January 2024	8 January 2024	2024	
Tony Mowbray	(England)	Birmingham City	8 January 2024	21 May 2024	2024	
Gary Rowett ‡	(England)	Birmingham City	19 March 2024	7 May 2024	2024	
Chris Davies †	(Wales)	Birmingham City	6 June 2024	Present*	2025–	
Steve Kean	(Scotland)	Blackburn Rovers	22 December 2010	29 September 2012	2012	
Eric Black ‡	(Scotland)	Blackburn Rovers	29 September 2012	31 October 2012	2012	
Henning Berg	(Norway)	Blackburn Rovers	31 October 2012	27 December 2012	2012	
Gary Bowyer ‡	(England)	Blackburn Rovers	27 December 2012	11 January 2013	2012–2013	
Michael Appleton	(England)	Blackburn Rovers	11 January 2013	19 March 2013	2013	
Gary Bowyer ‡	(England)	Blackburn Rovers	19 March 2013	24 May 2013	2013	
Gary Bowyer	(England)	Blackburn Rovers	24 May 2013	10 November 2015	2013–2015	
Paul Lambert	(Scotland)	Blackburn Rovers	15 November 2015	7 May 2016	2015–2016	
Owen Coyle	(Republic of Ireland)	Blackburn Rovers	2 June 2016	21 February 2017	2016–2017	
Tony Mowbray	(England)	Blackburn Rovers	22 February 2017	11 May 2022	2017; 2018–2022	
Jon Dahl Tomasson	(Denmark)	Blackburn Rovers	14 June 2022	9 February 2024	2022–2024	
John Eustace	(England)	Blackburn Rovers	9 February 2024	13 February 2025	2024–2025	
David Lowe ‡	(England)	Blackburn Rovers	13 February 2025	25 February 2025	2025	
Valérien Ismaël	(France)	Blackburn Rovers	25 February 2025	2 February 2026	2025–2026	
Damien Johnson ‡	(Northern Ireland)	Blackburn Rovers	2 February 2026	13 February 2026	2026	
Michael O'Neill	(Northern Ireland)	Blackburn Rovers	13 February 2026	2 May 2026	2026	
Tony Mowbray †	(England)	Blackburn Rovers	5 June 2026	Present*	2026–	
Simon Grayson	(England)	Blackpool	10 November 2005 (Note: Grayson served as caretaker manager until 5 August 2006, when he was given a long term appointment.)	23 December 2008	2007–2008	
Tony Parkes ‡	(England)	Blackpool	24 December 2008	19 May 2009	2008–2009	
Ian Holloway	(England)	Blackpool	21 May 2009	3 November 2012	2009–2010; 2011–2012	
Steve Thompson ‡	(England)	Blackpool	3 November 2012	7 November 2012	2012	
Michael Appleton	(England)	Blackpool	7 November 2012	11 January 2013	2012–2013	
Steve Thompson ‡	(England)	Blackpool	11 January 2013	16 February 2013	2013	
Paul Ince	(England)	Blackpool	16 February 2013	21 January 2014	2013–2014	
Barry Ferguson ‡	(Scotland)	Blackpool	21 January 2014	3 May 2014	2014	
José Riga	(Belgium)	Blackpool	11 June 2014	27 October 2014	2014	
Lee Clark	(England)	Blackpool	30 October 2014	9 May 2015	2014–2015	
Neil Critchley	(England)	Blackpool	2 March 2020	2 June 2022	2021–2022	
Michael Appleton	(England)	Blackpool	17 June 2022	18 January 2023	2022–2023	
Mick McCarthy	(Republic of Ireland)	Blackpool	19 January 2023	8 April 2023	2023	
Stephen Dobbie ‡	(Scotland)	Blackpool	8 April 2023	23 May 2023	2023	
Owen Coyle	(Republic of Ireland)	Bolton Wanderers	8 January 2010	9 October 2012	2012	
Jimmy Phillips ‡	(England)	Bolton Wanderers	9 October 2012	23 October 2012	2012	
Dougie Freedman	(Scotland)	Bolton Wanderers	23 October 2012	3 October 2014	2012–2014	
Neil Lennon	(Northern Ireland)	Bolton Wanderers	12 October 2014	15 March 2016	2014–2016	
Jimmy Phillips ‡	(England)	Bolton Wanderers	15 March 2016	10 June 2016	2016	
Phil Parkinson	(England)	Bolton Wanderers	10 June 2016	22 August 2019	2017–2019	
Steven Schumacher †	(England)	Bolton Wanderers	30 January 2025	Present*	2026–	
Eddie Howe	(England)	Bournemouth	12 October 2012	1 August 2020	2013–2015	
Jason Tindall	(England)	Bournemouth	8 August 2020	3 February 2021	2020–2021	
Jonathan Woodgate	(England)	Bournemouth	3 February 2021 (Note: Woodgate served as caretaker manager until 21 February 2021, when he was given a long term appointment.)	28 June 2021	2021	
Scott Parker	(England)	Bournemouth	28 June 2021	30 August 2022	2021–2022	
Mark Warburton	(England)	Brentford	10 December 2013	1 June 2015	2014–2015	
Marinus Dijkhuizen	(Netherlands)	Brentford	1 June 2015	28 September 2015	2015	
Lee Carsley	(Republic of Ireland)	Brentford	28 September 2015	30 November 2015	2015	
Dean Smith	(England)	Brentford	30 November 2015	10 October 2018	2015–2018	
Thomas Frank	(Denmark)	Brentford	16 October 2018	12 June 2025	2018–2021	
Mark McGhee	(Scotland)	Brighton & Hove Albion	28 October 2003	8 September 2006	2004–2006	
Gus Poyet	(Uruguay)	Brighton & Hove Albion	10 November 2010	23 June 2013	2011–2013	
Óscar García	(Spain)	Brighton & Hove Albion	26 June 2013	12 May 2014	2013–2014	
Sami Hyypiä	(Finland)	Brighton & Hove Albion	6 June 2014	22 December 2014	2014	
Nathan Jones ‡	(Wales)	Brighton & Hove Albion	22 December 2014	31 December 2014	2014	
Chris Hughton	(Republic of Ireland)	Brighton & Hove Albion	31 December 2014	13 May 2019	2014–2017	
Gary Johnson	(England)	Bristol City	23 September 2005	18 March 2010	2007–2010	
Keith Millen ‡	(England)	Bristol City	18 March 2010	2 May 2010	2010	
Steve Coppell	(England)	Bristol City	2 May 2010	12 August 2010	2010	
Keith Millen	(England)	Bristol City	12 August 2010	3 October 2011	2010–2011	
Steve Wigley ‡	(England)	Bristol City	3 October 2011	19 October 2011	2011	
Derek McInnes	(Scotland)	Bristol City	19 October 2011	12 January 2013	2011–2013	
Sean O'Driscoll	(Republic of Ireland)	Bristol City	14 January 2013	28 November 2013	2013	
Steve Cotterill	(England)	Bristol City	3 December 2013	14 January 2016	2013–2014; 2015–2016	
John Pemberton ‡	(England)	Bristol City	14 January 2016	6 February 2016	2016	
Lee Johnson	(England)	Bristol City	6 February 2016	4 July 2020	2016–2020	
Dean Holden	(England)	Bristol City	4 July 2020 (Note: Holden served as caretaker manager until 10 August 2020, when he was given a long term appointment.)	16 February 2021	2020–2021	
Paul Simpson ‡	(England)	Bristol City	16 February 2021	22 February 2021	2021	
Nigel Pearson	(England)	Bristol City	22 February 2021	29 October 2023	2021–2023	
Curtis Fleming ‡	(Republic of Ireland)	Bristol City	29 October 2023	7 November 2023	2023	
Liam Manning	(England)	Bristol City	7 November 2023	3 June 2025	2023–2025	
Gerhard Struber	(Austria)	Bristol City	19 June 2025	27 March 2026	2025–2026	
Roy Hodgson ‡	(England)	Bristol City	27 March 2026	2 May 2026	2026	
Michael Skubala †	(England)	Bristol City	29 May 2026	Present*	2026–	
Steve Cotterill	(England)	Burnley	3 June 2004	8 November 2007	2004–2007	
Steve Davis ‡	(England)	Burnley	8 November 2007	22 November 2007	2007	
Owen Coyle	(Republic of Ireland)	Burnley	22 November 2007	5 January 2010	2007–2009	
Brian Laws	(England)	Burnley	13 January 2010	29 December 2010	2010	
Stuart Gray ‡	(England)	Burnley	29 December 2010	14 January 2011	2010–2011	
Eddie Howe	(England)	Burnley	14 January 2011	12 October 2012	2011–2012	
Terry Pashley ‡	(England)	Burnley	16 October 2012	30 October 2012	2012	
Sean Dyche	(England)	Burnley	30 October 2012	15 April 2022	2012–2014; 2015–2016	
Vincent Kompany	(Belgium)	Burnley	14 June 2022	29 May 2024	2022–2023	
Scott Parker	(England)	Burnley	5 July 2024	30 April 2026	2024–2025	
Nicky Hayen	(Belgium)	Burnley	10 July 2026	24 October 2026	2026	
Fabio Celestini †	(Switzerland)	Burnley	28 October 2026	Present*	2026–	
Nigel Clough	(England)	Burton Albion	7 December 2015	18 May 2020	2016–2018	
Lennie Lawrence	(England)	Cardiff City	18 February 2002	25 May 2005	2004–2005	
Dave Jones	(England)	Cardiff City	25 May 2005	31 May 2011	2005–2011	
Malky Mackay	(Scotland)	Cardiff City	17 June 2011	27 December 2013	2011–2013	
Ole Gunnar Solskjær	(Norway)	Cardiff City	2 January 2014	18 September 2014	2014	
Danny Gabbidon ‡	(Wales)	Cardiff City	18 September 2014	5 October 2014	2014	
Scott Young ‡	(Wales)	Cardiff City	18 September 2014	5 October 2014	2014	
Russell Slade	(England)	Cardiff City	5 October 2014	7 May 2016	2014–2016	
Paul Trollope	(Wales)	Cardiff City	18 May 2016	4 October 2016	2016	
Neil Warnock	(England)	Cardiff City	5 October 2016	11 November 2019	2016–2018; 2019	
Neil Harris	(England)	Cardiff City	16 November 2019	21 January 2021	2019–2021	
Mick McCarthy	(Republic of Ireland)	Cardiff City	22 January 2021	23 October 2021	2021	
Steve Morison	(Wales)	Cardiff City	23 October 2021 (Note: Morison served as caretaker manager until 12 November 2021, when he was given a long term appointment.)	18 September 2022	2021–2022	
Mark Hudson	(England)	Cardiff City	18 September 2022 (Note: Hudson served as caretaker manager until 14 November 2022, when he was given a long term appointment.)	14 January 2023	2022–2023	
Dean Whitehead ‡	(England)	Cardiff City	14 January 2023	27 January 2023	2023	
Sabri Lamouchi	(France)	Cardiff City	27 January 2023	16 May 2023	2023	
Erol Bulut	(Turkey)	Cardiff City	3 June 2023	22 September 2024	2023–2024	
Omer Riza	(Turkey)	Cardiff City	22 September 2024 (Note: Riza served as caretaker manager until 5 December 2024, when he was given a long term appointment.)	19 April 2025	2024–2025	
Aaron Ramsey ‡	(Wales)	Cardiff City	19 April 2025	3 May 2025	2025	
Brian Barry-Murphy †	(Republic of Ireland)	Cardiff City	15 June 2025	Present*	2026–	
Alan Pardew	(England)	Charlton Athletic	24 December 2006	22 November 2008	2007–2008	
Phil Parkinson	(England)	Charlton Athletic	28 November 2008	4 January 2011	2008–2009	
Chris Powell	(England)	Charlton Athletic	14 January 2011	11 March 2014	2012–2014	
José Riga	(Belgium)	Charlton Athletic	11 March 2014	27 May 2014	2014	
Bob Peeters	(Belgium)	Charlton Athletic	27 May 2014	11 January 2015	2014–2015	
Damian Matthew ‡	(England)	Charlton Athletic	11 January 2015	13 January 2015	2015	
Ben Roberts ‡	(England)	Charlton Athletic	11 January 2015	13 January 2015	2015	
Guy Luzon	(Israel)	Charlton Athletic	13 January 2015	24 October 2015	2015	
Karel Fraeye ‡	(Belgium)	Charlton Athletic	26 October 2015	13 January 2016	2015–2016	
José Riga	(Belgium)	Charlton Athletic	14 January 2016	7 May 2016	2016	
Lee Bowyer	(England)	Charlton Athletic	22 March 2018 (Note: Bowyer served as caretaker manager until 6 September 2018, when he was given a long term appointment.)	15 March 2021	2019–2020	
Nathan Jones †	(Wales)	Charlton Athletic	4 February 2024	Present*	2025–	
Geraint Williams	(Wales)	Colchester United	28 June 2006	22 September 2008	2006–2008	
Peter Reid	(England)	Coventry City	6 May 2004	6 January 2005	2004–2005	
Adrian Heath ‡	(England)	Coventry City	6 January 2005	23 January 2005	2005	
Micky Adams	(England)	Coventry City	23 January 2005	17 January 2007	2005–2007	
Adrian Heath ‡	(England)	Coventry City	17 January 2007	19 February 2007	2007	
Iain Dowie	(Northern Ireland)	Coventry City	19 February 2007	11 February 2008	2007–2008	
Frankie Bunn ‡	(England)	Coventry City	11 February 2008	19 February 2008	2008	
John Harbin ‡	(New Zealand)	Coventry City	11 February 2008	19 February 2008	2008	
Chris Coleman	(Wales)	Coventry City	19 February 2008	4 May 2010	2008–2010	
Aidy Boothroyd	(England)	Coventry City	20 May 2010	14 March 2011	2010–2011	
Steve Harrison ‡	(England)	Coventry City	14 March 2011	28 April 2011	2011	
Andy Thorn	(England)	Coventry City	28 April 2011	26 August 2012	2011–2012	
Mark Robins	(England)	Coventry City	6 March 2017	7 November 2024	2020–2024	
Rhys Carr ‡	(Wales)	Coventry City	7 November 2024	28 November 2024	2024	
Frank Lampard §	(England)	Coventry City	28 November 2024	Present*	2024–2026	
Dario Gradi	(England) (Italy)	Crewe Alexandra	1 June 1983	1 July 2007	2004–2006	
Iain Dowie	(Northern Ireland)	Crystal Palace	22 December 2003	22 May 2006	2005–2006	
Peter Taylor	(England)	Crystal Palace	13 June 2006	8 October 2007	2006–2007	
Neil Warnock	(England)	Crystal Palace	11 October 2007	1 March 2010	2007–2010	
Paul Hart	(England)	Crystal Palace	2 March 2010	2 May 2010	2010	
George Burley	(Scotland)	Crystal Palace	17 June 2010	1 January 2011	2010–2011	
Dougie Freedman	(Scotland)	Crystal Palace	12 January 2011	23 October 2012	2011–2012	
Lennie Lawrence ‡	(England)	Crystal Palace	23 October 2012	1 November 2012	2012	
Ian Holloway	(England)	Crystal Palace	3 November 2012	23 October 2013	2012–2013	
George Burley	(Scotland)	Derby County	31 March 2003	8 June 2005	2004–2005	
Phil Brown	(England)	Derby County	24 June 2005	30 January 2006	2005–2006	
Terry Westley	(England)	Derby County	31 January 2006	2 May 2006	2006	
Billy Davies	(Scotland)	Derby County	2 June 2006	26 November 2007	2006–2007	
Paul Jewell	(England)	Derby County	28 November 2007	28 December 2008	2008	
Chris Hutchings ‡	(England)	Derby County	28 December 2008	7 January 2009	2008–2009	
Nigel Clough	(England)	Derby County	8 January 2009	28 September 2013	2009–2013	
Steve McClaren	(England)	Derby County	30 September 2013	25 May 2015	2013–2015	
Paul Clement	(England)	Derby County	1 June 2015	8 February 2016	2015–2016	
Darren Wassall	(England)	Derby County	8 February 2016	27 May 2016	2016	
Nigel Pearson	(England)	Derby County	27 May 2016	27 September 2016	2016	
Chris Powell ‡	(England)	Derby County	27 September 2016	12 October 2016	2016	
Steve McClaren	(England)	Derby County	12 October 2016	12 March 2017	2016–2017	
Gary Rowett	(England)	Derby County	14 March 2017	22 May 2018	2017–2018	
Frank Lampard	(England)	Derby County	31 May 2018	4 July 2019	2018–2019	
Phillip Cocu	(Netherlands)	Derby County	5 July 2019	14 November 2020	2019–2020	
Liam Rosenior ‡	(England)	Derby County	14 November 2020	26 November 2020	2020	
Shay Given ‡	(Republic of Ireland)	Derby County	14 November 2020	26 November 2020	2020	
Justin Walker ‡	(England)	Derby County	14 November 2020	26 November 2020	2020	
Wayne Rooney	(England)	Derby County	14 November 2020 (Note: Rooney served as caretaker manager until 15 January 2021, when he was given a long term appointment.)	24 June 2022	2020–2022	
Paul Warne	(England)	Derby County	22 September 2022	7 February 2025	2024–2025	
Matt Hamshaw ‡	(England)	Derby County	7 February 2025	13 February 2025	2025	
John Eustace †	(England)	Derby County	13 February 2025	Present*	2025–	
Sean O'Driscoll	(Republic of Ireland)	Doncaster Rovers	8 September 2006	23 September 2011	2007–2011	
Dean Saunders	(Wales)	Doncaster Rovers	23 September 2011	7 January 2013	2011–2012	
Paul Dickov	(Scotland)	Doncaster Rovers	20 May 2013	8 September 2015	2013–2014	
Felix Magath	(Germany)	Fulham	14 February 2014	18 September 2014	2014	
Kit Symons ‡	(Wales)	Fulham	18 September 2014	29 October 2014	2014	
Kit Symons	(Wales)	Fulham	29 October 2014	8 November 2015	2014–2015	
Peter Grant ‡	(Scotland)	Fulham	18 November 2015	8 December 2015	2015	
Stuart Gray ‡	(England)	Fulham	8 December 2015	27 December 2015	2015	
Slaviša Jokanović	(Serbia)	Fulham	27 December 2015	14 November 2018	2015–2018	
Scott Parker	(England)	Fulham	28 February 2019 (Note: Parker served as caretaker manager until 10 May 2019, when he was given a long term appointment.)	28 June 2021	2019–2020	
Marco Silva	(Portugal)	Fulham	1 July 2021	2 June 2026	2021–2022	
Andy Hessenthaler	(England)	Gillingham	12 June 2000	23 November 2004	2004	
John Gorman ‡	(Scotland)	Gillingham	23 November 2004	7 December 2004	2004	
Stan Ternent	(England)	Gillingham	7 December 2004	21 May 2005	2004–2005	
Simon Grayson	(England)	Huddersfield Town	20 February 2012	24 January 2013	2012–2013	
Mark Lillis ‡	(England)	Huddersfield Town	24 January 2013	14 February 2013	2013	
Mark Robins	(England)	Huddersfield Town	14 February 2013	10 August 2014	2013–2014	
Mark Lillis ‡	(England)	Huddersfield Town	10 August 2014	3 September 2014	2014	
Chris Powell	(England)	Huddersfield Town	3 September 2014	4 November 2015	2014–2015	
Mark Lillis ‡	(England)	Huddersfield Town	4 November 2015	8 November 2015	2015	
David Wagner	(United States)	Huddersfield Town	9 November 2015	14 January 2019	2015–2017	
Jan Siewert	(Germany)	Huddersfield Town	21 January 2019	16 August 2019	2019	
Mark Hudson ‡	(England)	Huddersfield Town	16 August 2019	9 September 2019	2019	
Danny Cowley	(England)	Huddersfield Town	9 September 2019	19 July 2020	2019–2020	
Danny Schofield ‡	(England)	Huddersfield Town	19 July 2020	23 July 2020	2020	
Carlos Corberán	(Spain)	Huddersfield Town	23 July 2020	7 July 2022	2020–2022	
Danny Schofield	(England)	Huddersfield Town	7 July 2022	14 September 2022	2022	
Paul Harsley ‡	(England)	Huddersfield Town	14 September 2022	28 September 2022	2022	
Narcís Pèlach ‡	(Spain)	Huddersfield Town	14 September 2022	28 September 2022	2022	
Mark Fotheringham	(Scotland)	Huddersfield Town	28 September 2022	8 February 2023	2022–2023	
Narcís Pèlach ‡	(Spain)	Huddersfield Town	8 February 2023	15 February 2023	2023	
Neil Warnock	(England)	Huddersfield Town	16 February 2023	20 September 2023	2023	
Darren Moore	(England)	Huddersfield Town	21 September 2023	29 January 2024	2023–2024	
Jon Worthington ‡	(England)	Huddersfield Town	29 January 2024	15 February 2024	2024	
André Breitenreiter	(Germany)	Huddersfield Town	15 February 2024	10 May 2024	2024	
Peter Taylor	(England)	Hull City	October 2002	13 June 2006	2004–2006	
Phil Parkinson	(England)	Hull City	29 June 2006	4 December 2006	2006	
Phil Brown	(England)	Hull City	4 January 2007	15 March 2010	2007–2008	
Nigel Pearson	(England)	Hull City	29 June 2010	15 November 2011	2010–2011	
Nicky Barmby	(England)	Hull City	15 November 2011 (Note: Barmby served as caretaker manager until 10 January 2012, when he was given a long term appointment.)	8 May 2012	2011–2012	
Steve Bruce	(England)	Hull City	8 June 2012	22 July 2016	2012–2013; 2015–2016	
Leonid Slutsky	(Russia)	Hull City	9 June 2017	3 December 2017	2017	
Nigel Adkins	(England)	Hull City	7 December 2017	21 June 2019	2017–2019	
Grant McCann	(Northern Ireland)	Hull City	21 June 2019	25 January 2022	2019–2020; 2021–2022	
Shota Arveladze	(Georgia (country))	Hull City	27 January 2022	30 September 2022	2022	
Andy Dawson ‡	(England)	Hull City	30 September 2022	3 November 2022	2022	
Liam Rosenior	(England)	Hull City	3 November 2022	7 May 2024	2022–2024	
Tim Walter	(Germany)	Hull City	1 July 2024	27 November 2024	2024	
Andy Dawson ‡	(England)	Hull City	27 November 2024	6 December 2024	2024	
Rubén Sellés	(Spain)	Hull City	6 December 2024	15 May 2025	2024–2025	
Sergej Jakirović §	(Bosnia and Herzegovina)	Hull City	11 June 2025	Present*	2025–2026	
Joe Royle	(England)	Ipswich Town	28 November 2002	11 May 2006	2004–2006	
Jim Magilton	(Northern Ireland)	Ipswich Town	5 June 2006	22 April 2009	2006–2009	
Roy Keane	(Republic of Ireland)	Ipswich Town	23 April 2009	7 January 2011	2009–2011	
Paul Jewell	(England)	Ipswich Town	10 January 2011	24 October 2012	2011–2012	
Chris Hutchings ‡	(England)	Ipswich Town	24 October 2012	1 November 2012	2012	
Mick McCarthy	(Republic of Ireland)	Ipswich Town	1 November 2012	10 April 2018	2012–2018	
Bryan Klug ‡	(England)	Ipswich Town	10 April 2018	30 May 2018	2018	
Paul Hurst	(England)	Ipswich Town	30 May 2018	25 October 2018	2018	
Bryan Klug ‡	(England)	Ipswich Town	25 October 2018	27 October 2018	2018	
Paul Lambert	(Scotland)	Ipswich Town	27 October 2018	28 February 2021	2018–2019	
Kieran McKenna	(Northern Ireland)	Ipswich Town	16 December 2021	10 June 2026	2023–2024; 2025–2026	
Kevin Blackwell	(England)	Leeds United	1 June 2004	20 September 2006	2004–2006	
John Carver ‡	(England)	Leeds United	21 September 2006	23 October 2006	2006	
David Geddis ‡	(England)	Leeds United	23 October 2006	20 September 2006	2006	
Dennis Wise	(England)	Leeds United	20 September 2006	29 January 2008	2006–2007	
Simon Grayson	(England)	Leeds United	23 December 2008	1 February 2012	2010–2012	
Neil Redfearn ‡	(England)	Leeds United	1 February 2012	18 February 2012	2012	
Neil Warnock	(England)	Leeds United	18 February 2012	1 April 2013	2012–2013	
Brian McDermott	(England)	Leeds United	12 April 2013	30 May 2014	2013–2014	
David Hockaday	(England)	Leeds United	12 June 2014	28 August 2014	2014	
Neil Redfearn ‡	(England)	Leeds United	28 August 2014	23 September 2014	2014	
Darko Milanič	(Slovenia)	Leeds United	23 September 2014	25 October 2014	2014	
Neil Redfearn	(England)	Leeds United	1 November 2014	20 May 2015	2014–2015	
Uwe Rösler	(Germany)	Leeds United	20 May 2015	19 October 2015	2015	
Steve Evans	(Scotland)	Leeds United	19 October 2015	31 May 2016	2015–2016	
Garry Monk	(England)	Leeds United	2 June 2016	25 May 2017	2016–2017	
Thomas Christiansen	(Spain)	Leeds United	15 June 2017	4 February 2018	2017–2018	
Paul Heckingbottom	(England)	Leeds United	6 February 2018	1 June 2018	2018	
Marcelo Bielsa	(Argentina)	Leeds United	15 June 2018	27 February 2022	2018–2020	
Daniel Farke §	(Germany)	Leeds United	4 July 2023	Present*	2023–2025	
Micky Adams	(England)	Leicester City	4 April 2002	11 October 2004	2004	
Dave Bassett ‡	(England)	Leicester City	11 October 2004	31 October 2004	2004	
Craig Levein	(Scotland)	Leicester City	29 October 2004	25 January 2005	2004–2007	
Rob Kelly	(England)	Leicester City	25 January 2006 (Note: Kelly served as caretaker manager until 13 February 2006, when he was given a long term appointment.)	11 April 2007	2005–2006	
Nigel Worthington	(England)	Leicester City	11 April 2007	25 May 2007	2007	
Martin Allen	(England)	Leicester City	25 May 2007	29 August 2007	2007	
Steve Beaglehole ‡	(England)	Leicester City	29 August 2007	13 September 2007	2007	
Jon Rudkin ‡	(England)	Leicester City	29 August 2007	13 September 2007	2007	
Mike Stowell ‡	(England)	Leicester City	29 August 2007	13 September 2007	2007	
Gary Megson	(England)	Leicester City	13 September 2007	24 October 2007	2007	
Frank Burrows ‡	(England)	Leicester City	24 October 2007	22 November 2007	2007	
Gerry Taggart ‡	(England)	Leicester City	24 October 2007	22 November 2007	2007	
Ian Holloway	(England)	Leicester City	22 November 2007	23 May 2008	2007–2008	
Nigel Pearson	(England)	Leicester City	20 June 2008	29 June 2009	2009–2010	
Paulo Sousa	(Portugal)	Leicester City	7 July 2010	1 October 2010	2010	
Sven-Göran Eriksson	(Sweden)	Leicester City	3 October 2010	25 October 2011	2010–2011	
Mike Stowell ‡	(England)	Leicester City	25 October 2011	15 November 2011	2011	
Nigel Pearson	(England)	Leicester City	15 November 2011	30 June 2015	2011–2014	
Enzo Maresca	(Italy)	Leicester City	16 June 2023	3 June 2024	2023–2024	
Martí Cifuentes	(Spain)	Leicester City	15 July 2025	25 January 2026	2025–2026	
Andy King ‡	(Wales)	Leicester City	25 January 2026	18 February 2026	2026	
Gary Rowett	(England)	Leicester City	18 February 2026	2 May 2026	2026	
Chris Cohen †	(England)	Lincoln City	29 May 2026	Present*	2026–	
Tom Shaw †	(England)	Lincoln City	29 May 2026	Present*	2026–	
Mike Newell	(England)	Luton Town	23 June 2003	15 March 2007	2005–2007	
Brian Stein ‡	(England)	Luton Town	15 March 2007	27 March 2007	2007	
Kevin Blackwell	(England)	Luton Town	27 March 2007	16 January 2008	2007	
Graeme Jones	(England)	Luton Town	7 May 2019	24 April 2020	2019–2020	
Mick Harford ‡	(England)	Luton Town	24 April 2020	28 May 2020	2020	
Nathan Jones	(Wales)	Luton Town	28 May 2020	10 November 2022	2020–2022	
Mick Harford ‡	(England)	Luton Town	10 November 2022	17 November 2022	2022	
Rob Edwards	(Wales)	Luton Town	17 November 2022	9 January 2025	2022–2023; 2024–2025	
Richie Kyle ‡	(England)	Luton Town	9 January 2025	14 January 2025	2025	
Paul Trollope ‡	(Wales)	Luton Town	9 January 2025	14 January 2025	2025	
Matt Bloomfield	(England)	Luton Town	14 January 2025	6 October 2025	2025	
Gareth Southgate	(England)	Middlesbrough	7 June 2006	21 October 2009	2009	
Colin Cooper ‡	(England)	Middlesbrough	22 October 2009	26 October 2009	2009	
Gordon Strachan	(Scotland)	Middlesbrough	26 October 2009	18 October 2010	2009–2010	
Steve Agnew ‡	(England)	Middlesbrough	18 October 2010	26 October 2010	2010	
Tony Mowbray	(England)	Middlesbrough	26 October 2010	21 October 2013	2010–2013	
Aitor Karanka	(Spain)	Middlesbrough	13 November 2013	16 March 2017	2013–2016	
Garry Monk	(England)	Middlesbrough	9 June 2017	23 December 2017	2017	
Craig Liddle ‡	(England)	Middlesbrough	23 December 2017	26 December 2017	2017	
Tony Pulis	(Wales)	Middlesbrough	26 December 2017	17 May 2019	2017–2019	
Jonathan Woodgate	(England)	Middlesbrough	14 June 2019	23 June 2020	2019–2020	
Neil Warnock	(England)	Middlesbrough	23 June 2020	6 November 2021	2020–2021	
Chris Wilder	(England)	Middlesbrough	7 November 2021	3 October 2022	2021–2022	
Leo Percovich ‡	(Uruguay)	Middlesbrough	3 October 2022	24 October 2022	2022	
Michael Carrick	(England)	Middlesbrough	24 October 2022	4 June 2025	2022–2025	
Rob Edwards	(Wales)	Middlesbrough	24 June 2025	12 November 2025	2025	
Adi Viveash ‡	(England)	Middlesbrough	12 November 2025	26 November 2025	2025	
Kim Hellberg †	(Sweden)	Middlesbrough	26 November 2025	Present*	2025–	
Dennis Wise	(England)	Millwall	15 October 2003	9 May 2005	2004–2005	
Colin Lee	(England)	Millwall	27 July 2005	21 December 2005	2005	
Dave Tuttle	(England)	Millwall	21 December 2005	20 April 2006	2005–2006	
Tony Burns ‡	(England)	Millwall	12 April 2006	May 2006	2006	
Alan McLeary ‡	(England)	Millwall	12 April 2006	May 2006	2006	
Kenny Jackett	(Wales)	Millwall	6 November 2007	7 May 2013	2010–2013	
Steve Lomas	(Northern Ireland)	Millwall	6 June 2013	26 December 2013	2013	
Scott Fitzgerald ‡	(England)	Millwall	26 December 2013	6 January 2014	2013–2014	
Neil Harris ‡	(England)	Millwall	26 December 2013	6 January 2014	2013–2014	
Ian Holloway	(England)	Millwall	6 January 2014	10 March 2015	2014–2015	
Neil Harris	(England)	Millwall	10 March 2015 (Note: Harris served as caretaker manager until 29 April 2015, when he was given a long term appointment.)	3 October 2019	2015; 2017–2019	
Adam Barrett ‡	(England)	Millwall	3 October 2019	21 October 2019	2019	
Gary Rowett	(England)	Millwall	21 October 2019	18 October 2023	2019–2023	
Adam Barrett ‡	(England)	Millwall	18 October 2023	6 November 2023	2023	
Joe Edwards	(England)	Millwall	6 November 2023	21 February 2024	2023–2024	
Neil Harris	(England)	Millwall	21 February 2024	14 December 2024	2024	
David Livermore ‡	(England)	Millwall	16 December 2024	30 December 2024	2024	
Alex Neil †	(Scotland)	Millwall	30 December 2024	Present*	2024–	
Karl Robinson	(England)	Milton Keynes Dons	10 May 2010	23 October 2016	2015–2016	
Chris Hughton	(Republic of Ireland)	Newcastle United	1 June 2009 (Note: Hughton served as caretaker manager until 27 October 2009, when he was given a long term appointment.)	7 December 2010	2009–2010	
Rafael Benítez	(Spain)	Newcastle United	11 March 2016	30 June 2019	2016–2017	
Nigel Worthington	(Northern Ireland)	Norwich City	4 December 2000 (Note: Worthington served as caretaker manager until 2 January 2001, when he was given a long term appointment.)	1 October 2006	2005–2006	
Martin Hunter ‡	(England)	Norwich City	2 October 2006	13 October 2006	2006	
Peter Grant	(Scotland)	Norwich City	13 October 2006	9 October 2007	2006–2007	
Jim Duffy ‡	(Scotland)	Norwich City	9 October 2007	30 October 2007	2007	
Glenn Roeder	(England)	Norwich City	30 October 2007	16 January 2009	2007–2009	
Bryan Gunn	(Scotland)	Norwich City	16 January 2009 (Note: Gunn served as caretaker manager until 21 January 2009, when he was given a long term appointment.)	13 August 2009	2009	
Paul Lambert	(Scotland)	Norwich City	18 August 2009	2 June 2012	2010–2011	
Neil Adams	(England)	Norwich City	6 April 2014	5 January 2015	2014–2015	
Alex Neil	(Scotland)	Norwich City	9 January 2015	10 March 2017	2015; 2016–2017	
Alan Irvine ‡	(Scotland)	Norwich City	10 March 2017	25 May 2017	2017	
Daniel Farke	(Germany)	Norwich City	25 May 2017	6 November 2021	2017–2019; 2020–2021	
Dean Smith	(England)	Norwich City	15 November 2021	27 December 2022	2022	
Steve Weaver ‡	(England)	Norwich City	27 December 2022	6 January 2023	2022–2023	
Allan Russell ‡	(Scotland)	Norwich City	27 December 2022	6 January 2023	2022–2023	
David Wagner	(United States)	Norwich City	6 January 2023	17 May 2024	2023–2024	
Johannes Hoff Thorup	(Denmark)	Norwich City	30 May 2024	22 April 2025	2024–2025	
Jack Wilshere ‡	(England)	Norwich City	22 April 2025	3 May 2025	2025	
Liam Manning	(England)	Norwich City	3 June 2025	8 November 2025	2025	
Ryan Garry ‡	(England)	Norwich City	8 November 2025	18 November 2025	2025	
Philippe Clement †	(Belgium)	Norwich City	18 November 2025	Present*	2025–	
Colin Calderwood	(Scotland)	Nottingham Forest	30 May 2006	26 December 2008	2007–2008	
John Pemberton ‡	(England)	Nottingham Forest	26 December 2008	31 December 2008	2008	
Billy Davies	(Scotland)	Nottingham Forest	1 January 2009	12 June 2011	2009–2011	
Steve McClaren	(England)	Nottingham Forest	13 June 2011	2 October 2011	2011	
Steve Cotterill	(England)	Nottingham Forest	14 October 2011	12 July 2012	2011–2012	
Sean O'Driscoll	(Republic of Ireland)	Nottingham Forest	19 July 2012	26 December 2012	2012	
Alex McLeish	(Scotland)	Nottingham Forest	27 December 2012	5 February 2013	2012–2013	
Billy Davies	(Scotland)	Nottingham Forest	7 February 2013	24 March 2014	2013–2014	
Gary Brazil ‡	(England)	Nottingham Forest	24 March 2014	3 May 2014	2014	
Stuart Pearce	(England)	Nottingham Forest	1 July 2014	1 February 2015	2014–2015	
Dougie Freedman	(Scotland)	Nottingham Forest	1 February 2015	13 March 2016	2015–2016	
Paul Williams ‡	(England)	Nottingham Forest	13 March 2016	12 May 2016	2016	
Philippe Montanier	(France)	Nottingham Forest	27 June 2016	14 January 2017	2016–2017	
Gary Brazil ‡	(England)	Nottingham Forest	14 January 2017	14 March 2017	2017	
Mark Warburton	(England)	Nottingham Forest	14 March 2017	31 December 2017	2017	
Gary Brazil ‡	(England)	Nottingham Forest	31 December 2017	8 January 2018	2017–2018	
Aitor Karanka	(Spain)	Nottingham Forest	8 January 2018	11 January 2019	2018–2019	
Simon Ireland ‡	(England)	Nottingham Forest	11 January 2019	15 January 2019	2019	
Martin O'Neill	(Northern Ireland)	Nottingham Forest	15 January 2019	28 June 2019	2019	
Sabri Lamouchi	(France)	Nottingham Forest	28 June 2019	6 October 2020	2019–2020	
Chris Hughton	(Republic of Ireland)	Nottingham Forest	6 October 2020	16 September 2021	2020–2021	
Steven Reid ‡	(Republic of Ireland)	Nottingham Forest	16 September 2021	21 September 2021	2021	
Steve Cooper	(Wales)	Nottingham Forest	21 September 2021	19 December 2023	2021–2022	
Des Buckingham	(England)	Oxford United	16 November 2023	15 December 2024	2024	
Gary Rowett	(England)	Oxford United	20 December 2024	23 December 2025	2024–2025	
Craig Short ‡	(England)	Oxford United	23 December 2025	9 January 2026	2025–2026	
Matt Bloomfield	(England)	Oxford United	9 January 2026	20 June 2026	2026	
Darren Ferguson	(Scotland)	Peterborough United	20 January 2007	9 November 2009	2009	
Mark Cooper	(Scotland)	Peterborough United	14 November 2009	1 February 2010	2009–2010	
Jim Gannon	(Republic of Ireland)	Peterborough United	2 February 2010	6 April 2010	2010	
Gary Johnson	(England)	Peterborough United	6 April 2010	10 January 2011	2010	
Darren Ferguson	(Scotland)	Peterborough United	12 January 2011	21 February 2015	2011–2013	
Darren Ferguson	(Scotland)	Peterborough United	26 January 2019	20 February 2022	2021–2022	
Matthew Etherington ‡	(England)	Peterborough United	22 February 2022	24 February 2022	2022	
Grant McCann	(Northern Ireland)	Peterborough United	24 February 2022	4 January 2023	2022	
Bobby Williamson	(England)	Plymouth Argyle	20 April 2004	6 September 2005	2004–2005	
Tony Pulis	(Wales)	Plymouth Argyle	25 September 2005	14 June 2006	2005–2006	
Ian Holloway	(England)	Plymouth Argyle	28 June 2006	21 November 2007	2006–2007	
Paul Sturrock	(Scotland)	Plymouth Argyle	27 November 2007	10 December 2009	2007–2009	
Paul Mariner	(England)	Plymouth Argyle	10 December 2009	6 May 2010	2009–2010	
Steven Schumacher	(England)	Plymouth Argyle	7 December 2021	19 December 2023	2023	
Neil Dewsnip ‡	(England)	Plymouth Argyle	19 December 2023	5 January 2024	2023–2024	
Ian Foster	(England)	Plymouth Argyle	5 January 2024	1 April 2024	2024	
Neil Dewsnip ‡	(England)	Plymouth Argyle	1 April 2024	25 May 2024	2024	
Wayne Rooney	(England)	Plymouth Argyle	25 May 2024	31 December 2024	2024	
Kevin Nancekivell ‡	(England)	Plymouth Argyle	31 December 2024	10 January 2025	2024–2025	
Miron Muslić	(Austria)	Plymouth Argyle	10 January 2025	31 May 2025	2025	
Steve Cotterill	(England)	Portsmouth	18 June 2010	14 October 2011	2010–2011	
Guy Whittingham ‡	(England)	Portsmouth	14 October 2011	10 November 2011	2011	
Michael Appleton	(England)	Portsmouth	10 November 2011	7 November 2012	2011–2012	
John Mousinho †	(England)	Portsmouth	23 January 2023	Present*	2024–	
Billy Davies	(Scotland)	Preston North End	29 August 2004	2 June 2006	2004–2006	
Paul Simpson	(England)	Preston North End	17 June 2006	13 November 2007	2006–2007	
Alan Irvine	(Scotland)	Preston North End	20 November 2007	29 December 2009	2007–2009	
Rob Kelly ‡	(England)	Preston North End	29 December 2009	6 January 2010	2009–2010	
Darren Ferguson	(Scotland)	Preston North End	6 January 2010	29 December 2010	2010	
Phil Brown	(England)	Preston North End	6 January 2011	14 December 2011	2011	
Simon Grayson	(England)	Preston North End	18 February 2013	29 June 2017	2015–2017	
Alex Neil	(Scotland)	Preston North End	4 July 2017	21 March 2021	2017–2021	
Frankie McAvoy	(Scotland)	Preston North End	21 March 2021 (Note: McAvoy served as caretaker manager until 10 May 2021, when he was given a long term appointment.)	6 December 2021	2021	
Ryan Lowe	(England)	Preston North End	7 December 2021	12 August 2024	2021–2024	
Mike Marsh ‡	(England)	Preston North End	12 August 2024	18 August 2024	2024	
Paul Heckingbottom	(England)	Preston North End	20 August 2024	13 September 2026	2024–2026	
Jason Euell †	(Jamaica)	Preston North End	13 September 2026	28 September 2026	2026	
Graham Alexander †	(Scotland)	Preston North End	28 September 2026	Present*	2026–	
Ian Holloway	(England)	Queens Park Rangers	26 February 2001	6 February 2006	2004–2006	
Gary Waddock	(Republic of Ireland)	Queens Park Rangers	6 February 2006	20 September 2006	2006	
John Gregory	(England)	Queens Park Rangers	20 September 2006	1 October 2007	2006–2007	
Mick Harford ‡	(England)	Queens Park Rangers	1 October 2007	29 October 2007	2007	
Luigi De Canio	(Italy)	Queens Park Rangers	29 October 2007	14 May 2008	2007–2008	
Iain Dowie	(Northern Ireland)	Queens Park Rangers	14 May 2008	24 October 2008	2008	
Gareth Ainsworth ‡	(England)	Queens Park Rangers	24 October 2008	19 November 2008	2008	
Paulo Sousa	(Portugal)	Queens Park Rangers	19 November 2008	9 April 2009	2008–2009	
Gareth Ainsworth ‡	(England)	Queens Park Rangers	9 April 2009	3 June 2009	2009	
Jim Magilton	(Northern Ireland)	Queens Park Rangers	3 June 2009	16 December 2009	2009	
Steve Gallen ‡	(Republic of Ireland)	Queens Park Rangers	16 December 2009	17 December 2009	2009	
Marc Bircham ‡	(Canada)	Queens Park Rangers	16 December 2009	17 December 2009	2009	
Paul Hart	(England)	Queens Park Rangers	17 December 2009	15 January 2010	2009–2010	
Mick Harford ‡	(England)	Queens Park Rangers	14 January 2010	1 March 2010	2010	
Neil Warnock	(England)	Queens Park Rangers	1 March 2010	8 January 2012	2010–2011	
Harry Redknapp	(England)	Queens Park Rangers	24 November 2012	3 February 2015	2013–2014	
Chris Ramsey	(England)	Queens Park Rangers	12 February 2015	4 November 2015	2015	
Neil Warnock ‡	(England)	Queens Park Rangers	4 November 2015	4 December 2015	2015	
Jimmy Floyd Hasselbaink	(Netherlands)	Queens Park Rangers	4 December 2015	5 November 2016	2015–2016	
Ian Holloway	(England)	Queens Park Rangers	11 November 2016	10 May 2018	2016–2018	
Steve McClaren	(England)	Queens Park Rangers	18 May 2018	1 April 2019	2018–2019	
John Eustace ‡	(England)	Queens Park Rangers	1 April 2019	8 May 2019	2019	
Mark Warburton	(England)	Queens Park Rangers	8 May 2019	1 June 2022	2019–2022	
Michael Beale	(England)	Queens Park Rangers	1 June 2022	28 November 2022	2022	
Paul Hall ‡	(Jamaica)	Queens Park Rangers	28 November 2022	11 December 2022	2022	
Neil Critchley	(England)	Queens Park Rangers	11 December 2022	19 February 2023	2022–2023	
Gareth Ainsworth	(England)	Queens Park Rangers	21 February 2023	28 October 2023	2023	
Martí Cifuentes	(Spain)	Queens Park Rangers	30 October 2023	24 June 2025	2023–2025	
Julien Stéphan †	(France)	Queens Park Rangers	25 June 2025	Present*	2025–	
Steve Coppell	(England)	Reading	9 October 2003	12 May 2009	2004–2006; 2008–2009	
Brendan Rodgers	(Northern Ireland)	Reading	5 June 2009	16 December 2009	2009	
Brian McDermott	(England)	Reading	17 December 2009	11 March 2013	2009–2012	
Nigel Adkins	(England)	Reading	26 March 2013	15 December 2014	2013–2014	
Steve Clarke	(Scotland)	Reading	15 December 2014	4 December 2015	2014–2015	
Martin Kuhl ‡	(England)	Reading	4 December 2015	17 December 2015	2015	
Brian McDermott	(England)	Reading	17 December 2015	27 May 2016	2015–2016	
Jaap Stam	(Netherlands)	Reading	13 June 2016	21 March 2018	2016–2018	
Paul Clement	(England)	Reading	23 March 2018	6 December 2018	2018	
Scott Marshall ‡	(England)	Reading	6 December 2018	22 December 2018	2018	
José Manuel Gomes	(Portugal)	Reading	22 December 2018	9 October 2019	2018–2019	
Mark Bowen	(Wales)	Reading	14 October 2019	29 August 2020	2019–2020	
Veljko Paunović	(Serbia)	Reading	29 August 2020	19 February 2022	2020–2022	
Paul Ince	(England)	Reading	19 February 2022 (Note: Ince served as caretaker manager until 16 May 2022, when he was given a long term appointment.)	11 April 2023	2022–2023	
Noel Hunt ‡	(Republic of Ireland)	Reading	11 April 2023	8 May 2023	2023	
Ronnie Moore	(England)	Rotherham United	24 May 1997	31 January 2005	2004–2005	
Alan Knill ‡	(England)	Rotherham United	31 January 2005	7 April 2005	2005	
Mick Harford	(England)	Rotherham United	7 April 2005	10 December 2005	2005	
Steve Evans	(Scotland)	Rotherham United	9 April 2012	28 September 2015	2014–2015	
Eric Black ‡	(Scotland)	Rotherham United	28 September 2015	9 October 2015	2015	
Neil Redfearn	(England)	Rotherham United	9 October 2015	8 February 2016	2015–2016	
Neil Warnock	(England)	Rotherham United	11 February 2016	18 May 2016	2016	
Alan Stubbs	(England)	Rotherham United	1 June 2016	19 October 2016	2016	
Kenny Jackett	(Wales)	Rotherham United	21 October 2016	28 November 2016	2016	
Paul Warne	(England)	Rotherham United	28 November 2016 (Note: Warne served as caretaker manager until 13 January 2017, when he was given a long term appointment.)	22 September 2022	2016–2017; 2018–2019; 2020–2021; 2022	
Richard Wood ‡	(England)	Rotherham United	30 September 2022	4 October 2022	2022	
Lee Peltier ‡	(England)	Rotherham United	30 September 2022	4 October 2022	2022	
Matt Taylor	(England)	Rotherham United	4 October 2022	13 November 2023	2022–2023	
Scott Brown ‡	(England)	Rotherham United	14 November 2023	11 December 2023	2023	
Wayne Carlisle ‡	(Northern Ireland)	Rotherham United	14 November 2023	11 December 2023	2023	
Dan Green ‡	(England)	Rotherham United	14 November 2023	11 December 2023	2023	
Leam Richardson	(England)	Rotherham United	11 December 2023	17 April 2024	2023–2024	
Steve Evans	(Scotland)	Rotherham United	17 April 2024	30 March 2025	2024	
Nigel Adkins	(England)	Scunthorpe United	6 November 2006	12 September 2010	2007–2008; 2009–2010	
Ian Baraclough	(England)	Scunthorpe United	24 September 2010	16 March 2011	2010–2011	
Tony Daws ‡	(England)	Scunthorpe United	16 March 2011	31 March 2011	2011	
Alan Knill	(Wales)	Scunthorpe United	31 March 2011	29 October 2012	2011	
Neil Warnock	(England)	Sheffield United	2 December 1999	17 May 2007	2004–2006	
Bryan Robson	(England)	Sheffield United	22 May 2007	14 February 2008	2007–2008	
Kevin Blackwell	(England)	Sheffield United	14 February 2008	14 August 2010	2008–2010	
Gary Speed	(Wales)	Sheffield United	16 August 2010	14 December 2010	2010	
Micky Adams	(England)	Sheffield United	30 December 2010	10 May 2011	2010–2011	
Chris Wilder	(England)	Sheffield United	12 May 2016	13 March 2021	2017–2019	
Slaviša Jokanović	(Serbia)	Sheffield United	27 May 2021	25 November 2021	2021	
Paul Heckingbottom	(England)	Sheffield United	25 November 2021	5 December 2023	2021–2023	
Chris Wilder	(England)	Sheffield United	5 December 2023	18 June 2025	2024–2025	
Rubén Sellés	(Spain)	Sheffield United	18 June 2025	14 September 2025	2025	
Chris Wilder †	(England)	Sheffield United	15 September 2025	Present*	2025–	
Paul Sturrock	(Scotland)	Sheffield Wednesday	23 September 2004	19 October 2006	2005–2006	
Sean McAuley ‡	(England)	Sheffield Wednesday	19 October 2006	6 November 2006	2006	
Brian Laws	(England)	Sheffield Wednesday	6 November 2006	13 December 2009	2006–2009	
Sean McAuley ‡	(England)	Sheffield Wednesday	13 December 2009	8 January 2010	2009–2010	
Alan Irvine	(Scotland)	Sheffield Wednesday	8 January 2010	3 February 2011	2010	
Dave Jones	(England)	Sheffield Wednesday	1 March 2012	1 December 2013	2012–2013	
Stuart Gray	(England)	Sheffield Wednesday	1 December 2013 (Note: Gray served as caretaker manager until 25 January 2014, when he was given a long term appointment.)	11 June 2015	2013–2015	
Carlos Carvalhal	(Portugal)	Sheffield Wednesday	30 June 2015	24 December 2017	2015–2017	
Lee Bullen ‡	(Scotland)	Sheffield Wednesday	24 December 2017	7 January 2018	2017–2018	
Jos Luhukay	(Netherlands)	Sheffield Wednesday	8 January 2018	21 December 2018	2018	
Lee Bullen ‡	(Scotland)	Sheffield Wednesday	21 December 2018	2 January 2019	2018–2019	
Steve Agnew ‡	(England)	Sheffield Wednesday	2 January 2019	31 January 2019	2019	
Stephen Clemence ‡	(England)	Sheffield Wednesday	2 January 2019	31 January 2019	2019	
Steve Bruce	(England)	Sheffield Wednesday	1 February 2019	15 July 2019	2019	
Lee Bullen ‡	(Scotland)	Sheffield Wednesday	29 July 2019	6 September 2019	2019	
Garry Monk	(England)	Sheffield Wednesday	6 September 2019	9 November 2020	2019–2020	
Tony Pulis	(Wales)	Sheffield Wednesday	13 November 2020	28 December 2020	2020	
Neil Thompson ‡	(England)	Sheffield Wednesday	28 December 2020	1 March 2021	2020–2021	
Darren Moore	(Jamaica)	Sheffield Wednesday	1 March 2021	19 June 2023	2021	
Xisco Muñoz	(Spain)	Sheffield Wednesday	4 July 2023	4 October 2023	2023	
Neil Thompson †	(England)	Sheffield Wednesday	4 October 2023	13 October 2023	2023	
Danny Röhl	(Germany)	Sheffield Wednesday	13 October 2023	29 July 2025	2023–2025	
Henrik Pedersen	(Denmark)	Sheffield Wednesday	31 July 2025	25 October 2026	2025–2026	
Harry Redknapp	(England)	Southampton	8 December 2004	2 December 2005	2005	
Dave Bassett ‡	(England)	Southampton	2 December 2005	23 December 2005	2005	
Dennis Wise ‡	(England)	Southampton	2 December 2005	23 December 2005	2005	
George Burley	(Scotland)	Southampton	23 December 2005	23 January 2008	2005–2008	
Jason Dodd ‡	(England)	Southampton	23 January 2008	13 February 2008	2008	
John Gorman ‡	(Scotland)	Southampton	23 January 2008	13 February 2008	2008	
Nigel Pearson	(England)	Southampton	13 February 2008	30 May 2008	2008	
Jan Poortvliet	(Netherlands)	Southampton	30 May 2008	23 January 2009	2009	
Mark Wotte	(Netherlands)	Southampton	23 January 2009	9 June 2009	2009	
Nigel Adkins	(England)	Southampton	12 September 2010	18 January 2013	2011–2012	
Russell Martin	(Scotland)	Southampton	21 June 2023	15 December 2024	2023–2024	
Will Still	(Belgium)	Southampton	25 May 2025	2 November 2025	2025	
Tonda Eckert ‡	(Germany)	Southampton	2 November 2025 (Note: Eckert served as caretaker manager until 5 December 2025, when he was given a long term appointment.)	Present*	2025–	
Steve Tilson	(England)	Southend United	20 November 2003	4 July 2010	2006–2007	
Tony Pulis	(Wales)	Stoke City	2 November 2002	28 June 2005	2004–2005	
Johan Boskamp	(Netherlands)	Stoke City	28 June 2005	15 June 2006	2005–2006	
Tony Pulis	(Wales)	Stoke City	15 June 2006	21 May 2013	2006–2008	
Gary Rowett	(England)	Stoke City	22 May 2018	8 January 2019	2018–2019	
Nathan Jones	(Wales)	Stoke City	9 January 2019	1 November 2019	2019	
Rory Delap ‡	(Republic of Ireland)	Stoke City	1 November 2019	8 November 2019	2019	
Michael O'Neill	(Northern Ireland)	Stoke City	8 November 2019	25 August 2022	2019–2022	
Dean Holden ‡	(Republic of Ireland)	Stoke City	25 August 2022	28 August 2022	2022	
Alex Neil	(Scotland)	Stoke City	28 August 2022	10 December 2023	2022–2023	
Paul Gallagher ‡	(Scotland)	Stoke City	10 December 2023	19 December 2023	2023	
Steven Schumacher	(England)	Stoke City	19 December 2023	16 September 2024	2023–2024	
Ryan Shawcross ‡	(England)	Stoke City	16 September 2024	18 September 2024	2024	
Narcís Pèlach	(Spain)	Stoke City	18 September 2024	27 December 2024	2024	
Ryan Shawcross ‡	(England)	Stoke City	27 December 2024	2 January 2025	2024–2025	
Mark Robins †	(England)	Stoke City	2 January 2025	Present*	2025–	
Mick McCarthy	(Republic of Ireland)	Sunderland	12 March 2003	6 March 2006	2004–2005	
Niall Quinn	(Republic of Ireland)	Sunderland	25 July 2006	30 August 2006	2006	
Roy Keane	(Republic of Ireland)	Sunderland	28 August 2006	4 December 2008	2006–2007	
Simon Grayson	(England)	Sunderland	29 June 2017	31 October 2017	2017	
Billy McKinlay ‡	(Scotland)	Sunderland	31 October 2017	19 November 2017	2017	
Robbie Stockdale ‡	(Scotland)	Sunderland	31 October 2017	19 November 2017	2017	
Chris Coleman	(Wales)	Sunderland	19 November 2017	29 April 2018	2017–2018	
Robbie Stockdale ‡	(Scotland)	Sunderland	30 April 2018	25 May 2018	2018	
Alex Neil	(Scotland)	Sunderland	11 February 2022	28 August 2022	2022	
Tony Mowbray	(England)	Sunderland	30 August 2022	4 December 2023	2022–2023	
Mike Dodds ‡	(England)	Sunderland	4 December 2023	18 December 2023	2023	
Michael Beale	(England)	Sunderland	18 December 2023	19 February 2024	2023–2024	
Mike Dodds ‡	(England)	Sunderland	19 February 2024	4 May 2024	2024	
Régis Le Bris §	(France)	Sunderland	1 July 2024	Present*	2024–2025	
Roberto Martínez	(Spain)	Swansea City	24 February 2007	15 June 2009	2008–2009	
Paulo Sousa	(Portugal)	Swansea City	23 June 2009	5 July 2010	2009–2010	
Brendan Rodgers	(Northern Ireland)	Swansea City	16 July 2010	30 May 2012	2010–2011	
Graham Potter	(England)	Swansea City	11 June 2018	20 May 2019	2018–2019	
Steve Cooper	(Wales)	Swansea City	13 June 2019	21 July 2021	2019–2021	
Russell Martin	(Scotland)	Swansea City	1 August 2021	21 June 2023	2021–2023	
Michael Duff	(Northern Ireland)	Swansea City	22 June 2023	4 December 2023	2023	
Alan Sheehan ‡	(Republic of Ireland)	Swansea City	4 December 2023	5 January 2024	2023–2024	
Luke Williams	(England)	Swansea City	5 January 2024	17 February 2025	2024–2025	
Alan Sheehan	(Republic of Ireland)	Swansea City	17 February 2025 (Note: Sheehan served as caretaker manager until 30 April 2025, when he was given a long term appointment.)	11 November 2025	2025	
Darren O'Dea ‡	(Republic of Ireland)	Swansea City	20 November 2025	24 November 2025	2025	
Vítor Matos †	(Portugal)	Swansea City	24 November 2025	Present*	2025–	
Ray Lewington	(England)	Watford	June 2002	29 March 2005	2004–2005	
Aidy Boothroyd	(England)	Watford	29 March 2005	3 November 2008	2005–2008	
Malky Mackay ‡	(Scotland)	Watford	4 November 2008	28 November 2008	2008	
Brendan Rodgers	(Northern Ireland)	Watford	24 November 2008	5 June 2009	2008–2009	
Malky Mackay	(Scotland)	Watford	15 June 2009	17 June 2011	2009–2011	
Sean Dyche	(England)	Watford	21 June 2011	3 July 2012	2011–2012	
Gianfranco Zola	(Italy)	Watford	7 July 2012	16 December 2013	2012–2013	
Giuseppe Sannino	(Italy)	Watford	18 December 2013	31 August 2014	2013–2014	
Óscar García	(Spain)	Watford	2 September 2014	29 September 2014	2014	
Billy McKinlay	(Scotland)	Watford	29 September 2014	7 October 2014	2014	
Slaviša Jokanović	(Serbia)	Watford	7 October 2014	5 June 2015	2014–2015	
Vladimir Ivić	(Serbia)	Watford	15 August 2020	19 December 2020	2020	
Xisco Muñoz	(Spain)	Watford	20 December 2020	3 October 2021	2020–2021	
Rob Edwards	(Wales)	Watford	23 May 2022	26 September 2022	2022	
Slaven Bilić	(Croatia)	Watford	26 September 2022	7 March 2023	2022–2023	
Chris Wilder	(England)	Watford	7 March 2023	10 May 2023	2023	
Valérien Ismaël	(France)	Watford	10 May 2023	9 March 2024	2023–2024	
Tom Cleverley	(England)	Watford	9 March 2024 (Note: Cleverley served as caretaker manager until 24 April 2024, when he was given a long term appointment.)	6 May 2025	2024–2025	
Paulo Pezzolano	(Uruguay)	Watford	13 May 2025	8 October 2025	2025	
Javi Gracia	(Spain)	Watford	8 October 2025	1 February 2026	2025–	
Charlie Daniels ‡	(England)	Watford	1 February 2026	9 February 2026	2026	
Edward Still	(England)	Watford	9 February 2026	3 May 2026	2026	
Alessio Dionisi †	(Italy)	Watford	15 June 2026	Present*	2026–	
Bryan Robson	(England)	West Bromwich Albion	9 November 2004	18 September 2006	2006	
Nigel Pearson ‡	(England)	West Bromwich Albion	18 September 2006	16 October 2006	2006	
Craig Shakespeare ‡	(England)	West Bromwich Albion	16 October 2006	18 October 2006	2006	
Tony Mowbray	(England)	West Bromwich Albion	18 October 2006	16 June 2009	2006–2008	
Roberto Di Matteo	(Italy)	West Bromwich Albion	30 June 2009	6 February 2011	2009–2010	
Darren Moore	(Jamaica)	West Bromwich Albion	2 April 2018 (Note: Moore served as caretaker manager until 18 May 2018, when he was given a long term appointment.)	9 March 2019	2018–2019	
James Shan ‡	(England)	West Bromwich Albion	9 March 2019	13 June 2019	2019	
Slaven Bilić	(Croatia)	West Bromwich Albion	13 June 2019	16 December 2020	2019–2020	
Valérien Ismaël	(France)	West Bromwich Albion	24 June 2021	2 February 2022	2021–2022	
Steve Bruce	(England)	West Bromwich Albion	3 February 2022	10 October 2022	2022	
Richard Beale ‡	(England)	West Bromwich Albion	10 October 2022	25 October 2022	2022	
Carlos Corberán	(Spain)	West Bromwich Albion	25 October 2022	24 December 2024	2022–2024	
Chris Brunt ‡	(Northern Ireland)	West Bromwich Albion	24 December 2024	17 January 2025	2024–2025	
Tony Mowbray	(England)	West Bromwich Albion	17 January 2025	21 April 2025	2025	
James Morrison ‡	(Scotland)	West Bromwich Albion	21 April 2025	3 May 2025	2025	
Ryan Mason	(England)	West Bromwich Albion	2 June 2025	6 January 2026	2025–2026	
James Morrison ‡	(Scotland)	West Bromwich Albion	6 January 2026	11 January 2026	2026	
Eric Ramsay	(Wales)	West Bromwich Albion	11 January 2026	24 February 2026	2026	
James Morrison †	(Scotland)	West Bromwich Albion	24 February 2026 (Note: Morrison served as caretaker manager until 30 April 2026, when he was given a long term appointment.)	Present*	2026–	
Alan Pardew	(England)	West Ham United	20 October 2003	11 December 2006	2004–2005	
Sam Allardyce	(England)	West Ham United	1 June 2011	24 May 2015	2011–2012	
Nuno Espírito Santo	(Portugal)	West Ham United	27 September 2025	3 November 2026	2026	
Scott Parker †	(England)	West Ham United	4 November 2026	Present*	2026–	
Paul Jewell	(England)	Wigan Athletic	12 June 2001	14 May 2007	2004–2005	
Owen Coyle	(Republic of Ireland)	Wigan Athletic	14 June 2013	2 December 2013	2013	
Uwe Rösler	(Germany)	Wigan Athletic	7 December 2013	13 November 2014	2013–2014	
Malky Mackay	(Scotland)	Wigan Athletic	19 November 2014	6 April 2015	2014–2015	
Gary Caldwell	(Scotland)	Wigan Athletic	7 April 2015	25 October 2016	2015; 2016	
Graham Barrow ‡	(England)	Wigan Athletic	25 October 2016	2 November 2016	2016	
Warren Joyce	(England)	Wigan Athletic	2 November 2016	13 March 2017	2016–2017	
Graham Barrow ‡	(England)	Wigan Athletic	13 March 2017	29 May 2017	2017	
Paul Cook	(England)	Wigan Athletic	31 May 2017	1 August 2020	2018–2020	
Leam Richardson	(England)	Wigan Athletic	13 November 2020 (Note: Richardson served as caretaker manager until 21 April 2021, when he was given a long term appointment.)	10 November 2022	2022	
Rob Kelly ‡	(England)	Wigan Athletic	10 November 2022	29 November 2022	2022	
Kolo Touré	(Ivory Coast)	Wigan Athletic	29 November 2022	26 January 2023	2022–2023	
Shaun Maloney	(Scotland)	Wigan Athletic	28 January 2023	5 March 2025	2023	
Dave Jones	(England)	Wolverhampton Wanderers	3 January 2001	1 November 2004	2004	
Stuart Gray ‡	(England)	Wolverhampton Wanderers	1 November 2004	7 December 2004	2004	
Glenn Hoddle	(England)	Wolverhampton Wanderers	7 December 2004	1 July 2006	2004–2006	
Mick McCarthy	(Republic of Ireland)	Wolverhampton Wanderers	21 July 2006	13 February 2012	2006–2009	
Ståle Solbakken	(Norway)	Wolverhampton Wanderers	1 July 2012	5 January 2013	2012–2013	
Dean Saunders	(Wales)	Wolverhampton Wanderers	7 January 2013	7 May 2013	2013	
Kenny Jackett	(Wales)	Wolverhampton Wanderers	31 May 2013	29 July 2016	2014–2016	
Walter Zenga	(Italy)	Wolverhampton Wanderers	30 July 2016	25 October 2016	2016	
Rob Edwards ‡	(Wales)	Wolverhampton Wanderers	25 October 2016	5 November 2016	2016	
Paul Lambert	(Scotland)	Wolverhampton Wanderers	5 November 2016	30 May 2017	2016–2017	
Nuno Espírito Santo	(Portugal)	Wolverhampton Wanderers	31 May 2017	24 May 2021	2017–2018	
César Peixoto †	(Portugal)	Wolverhampton Wanderers	15 June 2026	Present*	2026–	
Phil Parkinson †	(England)	Wrexham	1 July 2021	Present*	2025–	
Gareth Ainsworth	(England)	Wycombe Wanderers	24 September 2012	21 February 2023	2020–2021	
Gary Johnson	(England)	Yeovil Town	9 January 2012	4 February 2015	2013–2014	
