= List of current Premier League and English Football League managers =

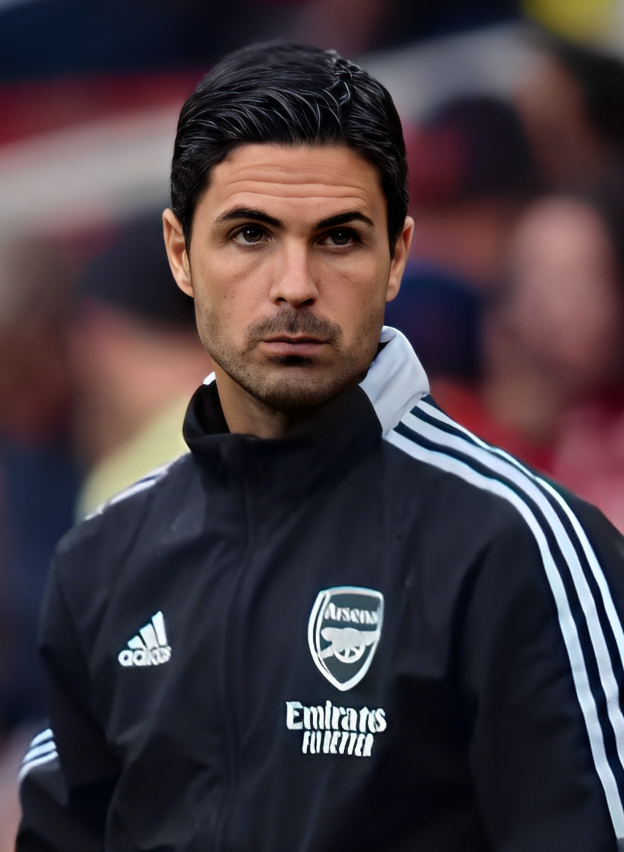
Mikel Arteta (pictured in 2021) has managed Arsenal since 2019, and is currently the longest serving manager in the top 4 divisions.

There are 92 association football teams in the top four divisions of English football, all of which have a manager (sometimes given the title of head coach) unless the position is currently vacant or a caretaker manager is in place. The Premier League and the English Football League (EFL) are the only fully professional football leagues in England. The Premier League is the top tier, and consists of 20 clubs at the top of the English football league system, while the remaining 72 clubs are split into three 24-team divisions of the EFL: the Championship, League One and League Two.

A 2020 study by broadcaster Sky Sports showed the average reign for departing managers in the 2019–20 season was an all-time low of 423 days. Mikel Arteta is currently the longest-serving manager in the top four divisions, having managed Arsenal since December 2019.

This list includes every manager currently managing a club in the Premier League and the EFL in order of the date that they took up the role. Some managers may have had more than one spell in charge at their current club: in such cases it is the start date of the current tenure that is applied.

== Managers ==
Manager	Nation	Date of birth	Club	Division	From	Time as manager	Ref(s)
Mikel Arteta	Spain	26 March 1982	Arsenal	Premier League	22 December 2019	6 years, 333 days	
Nigel Clough	England	19 March 1966	Mansfield Town	League One	6 November 2020	6 years, 14 days	
Phil Parkinson	England	1 December 1967	Wrexham	Championship	1 July 2021	5 years, 142 days	
Dean Brennan	Ireland	17 June 1980	Barnet	League Two	20 September 2021	5 years, 61 days	
Paul Cook	England	22 February 1967	Chesterfield	League Two	10 February 2022	4 years, 283 days	
Richie Wellens	England	26 March 1980	Leyton Orient	League One	9 March 2022	4 years, 256 days	
Johnnie Jackson	England	15 August 1982	AFC Wimbledon	League One	16 May 2022	4 years, 188 days	
Unai Emery	Spain	3 November 1971	Aston Villa	Premier League	1 November 2022	4 years, 19 days	
Lee Bell	England	26 January 1983	Crewe Alexandra	League Two	4 November 2022	4 years, 16 days	
John Mousinho	England	30 April 1986	Portsmouth	Championship	20 January 2023	3 years, 304 days	
Grant McCann	Northern Ireland	14 April 1980	Doncaster Rovers	League One	12 May 2023	3 years, 192 days	
Daniel Farke	Germany	30 October 1976	Leeds United	Premier League	4 July 2023	3 years, 139 days	
Micky Mellon	Scotland	18 March 1972	Oldham Athletic	League Two	13 October 2023	3 years, 38 days	
David Artell	Gibraltar	22 November 1980	Grimsby Town	League Two	27 November 2023	2 years, 358 days	
Danny Cowley	England	22 October 1978	Colchester United	League Two	4 January 2024	2 years, 320 days	
Nathan Jones	Wales	28 May 1973	Charlton Athletic	Championship	4 February 2024	2 years, 289 days	
John Doolan	England	10 November 1968	Accrington Stanley	League Two	4 March 2024	2 years, 261 days	
Alex Revell	England	7 July 1983	Stevenage	League One	17 April 2024	2 years, 217 days	
Chris Davies	Wales	27 March 1985	Birmingham City	Championship	6 June 2024	2 years, 167 days	
Régis Le Bris	France	6 December 1975	Sunderland	Premier League	1 July 2024	2 years, 142 days	
Fabian Hürzeler	Germany	26 February 1993	Brighton & Hove Albion	Premier League	2 July 2024	2 years, 141 days	
Ian Holloway	England	12 March 1963	Swindon Town	League Two	25 October 2024	2 years, 26 days	
Frank Lampard	England	20 June 1978	Coventry City	Premier League	28 November 2024	1 year, 357 days	
Gary Bowyer	England	22 June 1971	Burton Albion	League One	17 December 2024	1 year, 338 days	
Alex Neil	Scotland	9 June 1981	Millwall	Championship	30 December 2024	1 year, 325 days	
Mark Robins	England	22 December 1969	Stoke City	Championship	1 January 2025	1 year, 323 days	
David Moyes	Scotland	25 April 1963	Everton	Premier League	11 January 2025	1 year, 313 days	
Steven Schumacher	England	30 April 1984	Bolton Wanderers	Championship	30 January 2025	1 year, 294 days	
John Eustace	England	3 November 1979	Derby County	Championship	13 February 2025	1 year, 280 days	
Neil Harris	England	12 July 1977	Cambridge United	League One	19 February 2025	1 year, 274 days	
Gareth Ainsworth	England	10 May 1973	Gillingham	League Two	25 March 2025	1 year, 240 days	
Paul Warne	England	8 May 1973	Milton Keynes Dons	League One	15 April 2025	1 year, 219 days	
Sergej Jakirović	Bosnia and Herzegovina	23 December 1976	Hull City	Premier League	11 June 2025	1 year, 162 days	
Tom Cleverley	England	12 August 1989	Plymouth Argyle	League One	13 June 2025	1 year, 160 days	
Brian Barry-Murphy	Ireland	27 July 1978	Cardiff City	Championship	16 June 2025	1 year, 157 days	
Martin Paterson	Northern Ireland	10 May 1987	Notts County	League One	22 June 2025	1 year, 151 days	
Julien Stéphan	France	18 September 1980	Queens Park Rangers	Championship	25 June 2025	1 year, 148 days	
Keith Andrews	Ireland	13 September 1980	Brentford	Premier League	27 June 2025	1 year, 146 days	
Chris Wilder	England	23 September 1967	Sheffield United	Championship	15 September 2025	1 year, 66 days	
Steve Cotterill	England	20 July 1964	Cheltenham Town	League Two	30 September 2025	1 year, 51 days	
Jack Wilshere	England	1 January 1992	Luton Town	League One	13 October 2025	1 year, 38 days	
Leam Richardson	England	19 November 1979	Reading	League One	28 October 2025	1 year, 23 days	
Tonda Eckert	Germany	31 January 1993	Southampton	Championship	2 November 2025	1 year, 18 days	
Philippe Clement	Belgium	22 March 1974	Norwich City	Championship	18 November 2025	1 year, 2 days	
Kim Hellberg	Sweden	1 February 1988	Middlesbrough	Championship	27 November 2025	358 days	
Steve Evans	Scotland	30 October 1962	Bristol Rovers	League Two	16 December 2025	339 days	
Jon Brady	Australia	14 January 1975	Port Vale	League Two	6 January 2026	318 days	
Matt Lawlor	England	20 August 1988	Fleetwood Town	League Two	26 January 2026	298 days	
Gavin Cowan	England	24 May 1981	Shrewsbury Town	League Two	29 January 2026	295 days	
Gary Caldwell	Scotland	12 April 1982	Wigan Athletic	League One	16 February 2026	277 days	
James Morrison	Scotland	25 May 1986	West Bromwich Albion	Championship	24 February 2026	269 days	
Matt Taylor	England	30 January 1982	Exeter City	League Two	3 March 2026	262 days	
Roberto De Zerbi	Italy	6 June 1979	Tottenham Hotspur	Premier League	31 March 2026	234 days	
Daniel Stendel	Germany	4 April 1974	Barnsley	League One	12 May 2026	192 days	
Lee Grant	England	27 January 1983	Walsall	League Two	14 May 2026	190 days	
Chris Hogg	England	12 March 1985	Northampton Town	League Two	18 May 2026	186 days	
Darrell Clarke	England	16 December 1977	Tranmere Rovers	League Two	26 May 2026	178 days	
Martin Drury	England	10 April 1986	Huddersfield Town	League One	27 May 2026	177 days	
Michael Skubala	England	31 October 1982	Bristol City	Championship	29 May 2026	175 days	
Chris Cohen	England	5 March 1987	Lincoln City	Championship	29 May 2026	175 days	
Tom Shaw	England	1 December 1986	Lincoln City	Championship	29 May 2026	175 days	
Marco Rose	Germany	11 September 1976	Bournemouth	Premier League	1 June 2026	172 days	
Andoni Iraola	Spain	22 June 1982	Liverpool	Premier League	4 June 2026	169 days	
Jimmy McNulty	Scotland	13 February 1985	Stockport County	League One	5 June 2026	168 days	
Ian Watson	England	30 December 1985	Rochdale	League Two	9 June 2026	164 days	
Russell Martin	Scotland	4 January 1986	Leicester City	League One	15 June 2026	158 days	
Alessio Dionisi	Italy	1 April 1980	Watford	Championship	15 June 2026	158 days	
César Peixoto	Portugal	12 May 1980	Wolverhampton Wanderers	Championship	15 June 2026	158 days	
Peter Cklamovski	Australia	16 October 1978	Salford City	League Two	18 June 2026	155 days	
Gary O'Neil	England	18 May 1983	Ipswich Town	Premier League	23 June 2026	150 days	
Aaron Ramsey	Wales	26 December 1990	Oxford United	League One	23 June 2026	150 days	
Enzo Maresca	Italy	10 February 1980	Manchester City	Premier League	29 June 2026	144 days	
Alex Bruce	Northern Ireland	28 September 1984	Rotherham United	League Two	29 June 2026	144 days	
Xabi Alonso	Spain	25 November 1981	Chelsea	Premier League	1 July 2026	142 days	
Oliver Glasner	Austria	28 August 1974	Nottingham Forest	Premier League	6 July 2026	137 days	
Álvaro Arbeloa	Spain	17 January 1983	Fulham	Premier League	7 July 2026	136 days	
Scott Lindsey	England	4 May 1972	York City	League Two	27 July 2026	116 days	
Hayden Mullins	England	27 March 1979	Newport County	League Two	31 July 2026	112 days	
Matthias Jaissle	Germany	5 April 1988	Newcastle United	Premier League	5 August 2026	107 days	
Tom Hounsell	England	9 February 1990	Wycombe Wanderers	League One	8 September 2026	73 days	
Graham Alexander	Scotland	10 October 1971	Preston North End	Championship	28 September 2026	53 days	
Robbie Savage	Wales	18 October 1974	Peterborough United	League One	2 October 2026	49 days	
Michael Duff	Northern Ireland	11 January 1978	Bradford City	League One	6 October 2026	45 days	
Kevin Blackwell	England	21 December 1958	Crawley Town	League Two	21 October 2026	30 days	
Fabio Celestini	Switzerland	31 October 1975	Burnley	Championship	28 October 2026	23 days	
Dave Challinor	England	2 October 1975	Sheffield Wednesday	League One	1 November 2026	19 days	
Scott Parker	England	13 October 1980	West Ham United	Championship	4 November 2026	16 days	
Karl Robinson	England	13 September 1980	Bromley	League One	5 November 2026	15 days	
Thomas Frank	Denmark	9 October 1973	Crystal Palace	Premier League	16 November 2026	4 days	
Mike Dodds	England	3 June 1986	Blackburn Rovers	Championship	17 November 2026	3 days	
Mauricio Pochettino	Argentina	2 March 1972	Manchester United	Premier League	18 November 2026	2 days	
Vacant			Swansea City	Championship	18 November 2026	2 days	
Vacant			Blackpool	League One	20 November 2026	0 days	

== See also ==
- List of EFL Championship managers
- List of Premier League managers
- League Managers Association
