= League Managers Association =

English trade association

- Founded: 1992
- Headquarters: St. George's Park, Newborough Road, Needwood, Burton upon Trent, Staffordshire, DE13 9PD, UK
- Location: England
- Key people: Martin O'Neill - Chairman Richard Bevan - Chief Executive
- Affiliations: GFTU
- Website: leaguemanagers.com

The League Managers Association (LMA) is the trade union for Premier League, EFL and national team managers in English association football. The LMA awards the LMA Manager of the Year award annually.

== History ==
The union was founded in 1919 as the Football League Secretaries and Managers Association. Its membership grew gradually, reaching 223 in 1963, and 321 in 1974. In its early years, all of its members were men, with the first women joining in 1971.

== Organisation ==
The League Managers Association is the collective, representative voice of all managers from the Premier League, the Sky Bet Championship and Sky Bet Leagues 1 and 2. The LMA lobbies with the expertise of their members on various matters to football's governing organisations. Representatives of the LMA now sit on various Football Association panels charged with helping to run the game in England. It was set up in 1992 during the period when association football in England was undergoing major changes, including the split of the Premiership from the rest of the football league, and the introduction of satellite television coverage of football by Sky Television.

The president of the LMA is customarily the person serving as the manager of the England national football team, meaning the current president is Thomas Tuchel. Its chief executive is Richard Bevan, and the chairman is Martin O'Neill.

== LMA Institute of Leadership and High Performance ==
In April 2017, the LMA launched the LMA Institute of Leadership and High Performance. It was established to provide ongoing learning and continuous personal development to those working in professional football.

The LMA Institute of Leadership and High Performance encompasses the LMA Diploma in Football Management, which is accredited by the University of Liverpool and is joint funded by the League Managers Association, the Premier League, The Football Association and the Professional Footballers’ Association. The programme has been built after an extensive period of research and analysis across the professional game into the complexities and challenges faced by those who choose to build a career in football management and coaching. It is designed to be delivered on a modular basis, combining two residential summer schools and seven one-day workshops during the course of the year.

== Controversy ==
In August 2014 Malky Mackay and Iain Moody were accused of sending each other racist, sexist and homophobic text messages; the LMA defended Mackay by dismissing his action as "banter" in a press statement which was widely condemned. The LMA later apologised for this. There were calls for LMA chief executive Richard Bevan to resign as a result.

== In popular culture ==
The LMA added their name to a series of football management simulation games, LMA Manager by Codemasters, from 1999 to 2007.

== See also ==
- List of current Premier League and English Football League managers
- List of EFL Championship managers
- List of Premier League managers
