= Kevin Nancekivell =

English footballer (born 1971)

Personal information
- Date of birth: 22 October 1971 (age 55)
- Place of birth: Barnstaple, England
- Position: Attacking midfielder

Team information
- Current team: Plymouth Argyle (First Team Coach)

Senior career*
Years	Team	Apps	(Gls)
1987–1996	Bideford	339	(88)
1996–2000	Tiverton Town	166	(107)
2000–2001	Plymouth Argyle	6	(1)
2001	→ Tiverton Town (loan)	31	(11)
2001–2004	Tiverton Town	140	(44)

Managerial career
- 2013: Plymouth Argyle (joint caretaker)
- 2019: Plymouth Argyle (caretaker)
- 2023–2024: Plymouth Argyle (joint caretaker)
- 2024: Plymouth Argyle (joint caretaker)
- 2024–2025: Plymouth Argyle (joint caretaker)
- * Club domestic league appearances and goals

Kevin Nancekivell (born 22 October 1971) is an English football manager and former player, who is the First Team Coach of EFL League One club Plymouth Argyle.

As a player, Nancekivell was an attacking midfielder. He mainly competed at a semi-professional level, spending most of his career at Tiverton Town, although he did have a short stint as a professional at Argyle.

== Playing career ==
Originally from a farming background Nancekivell played for Bideford before joining Tiverton Town in 1996. He was a regular scorer from midfield, finishing as the club's top goalscorer twice, before being given a chance in the professional game at the age of 28 by Plymouth Argyle manager Kevin Hodges. He made six league appearances as a substitute, scoring his first goal against Hartlepool United on 21 October 2000, but fell out of first team contention after the arrival of Paul Sturrock. Nancekivell re-joined Tiverton Town on loan in January 2001 and returned to Ladysmead permanently that summer. He scored Tiverton's consolation goal in the FA Cup first round defeat against Cardiff City in November 2001.

== Coaching career ==
After retiring, Nancekivell took a job at Plymouth Argyle's youth coaching centre of excellence in 2005. He was promoted to coaching the first team in 2010. In January 2013 he was appointed as joint caretaker manager with Romain Larrieu following the sacking of Carl Fletcher. The duo lost their only game in charge, 4–0 to Port Vale. Nancekivell was released from his contract as First team coach following a backroom reshuffle by new manager John Sheridan however, he was offered an alternative role at the club and on 4 July 2013 he accepted a youth coaching role designed to help with youth team players' progression from the Academy to first-team football while also helping with the progress of some of the newer academy coaches.

In January 2014, Nancekivell was appointed as Professional Development Phase Coach for 17 to 21 year-olds at Torquay United, however following the closure of Torquay's Youth Department in May 2015, he made a return to Plymouth Argyle as Head of Academy Coaching. In June 2017, Nancekivell was awarded his UEFA Pro Licence and in May 2018 he was appointed as a first-team coach at Argyle, following the departure of Craig Brewster. After Derek Adams was sacked in April 2019, Nancekivell was appointed caretaker manager of Plymouth Argyle for their final match of the 2018–19 season. Following the appointment of Ryan Lowe as Plymouth Argyle manager in June 2019, Nancekivell retained his role as first team coach. In July 2021, he graduated from the University of Liverpool with the LMA Diploma in Football Management.

Following the departure of Steven Schumacher as Manager of Plymouth Argyle on 19 December 2023, Nancekivell and Director of Football Neil Dewsnip took joint charge of first-team duties until the appointment of Ian Foster on 5 January 2024. In this period, they managed five fixtures, winning one, losing one, and drawing the rest. Following Foster's dismissal on 1 April 2024, the pair took charge once more until the end of the 2023–24 season, immediately ending a seven-game winless streak and relegating Rotherham United.

In the 2024–25 season Nancekivell took on caretaker duties for the fifth time in his career, following the departure of Wayne Rooney. This time he took over in joint roles with club captain Joe Edwards. The duo managed three games, consisting of two league draws, and tail-ended by an FA Cup Third Round victory away to Brentford F.C. on 11 January 2025. When new head coach Miron Muslic took over, it was confirmed that Nancekivell would remain at the club as part of Muslic's coaching team.

== Personal life ==
Nancekivell grew up on a dairy farm in Bradworthy, North Devon.

He is part of the Horniwinks Racing Syndicate who own racehorse Adaay In Devon.

In January 2025 Kevin was awarded the Freedom of the City of Plymouth for his services to Plymouth Argyle and to the city of Plymouth.
