= Neil Dewsnip =

English footballer and coach

Personal information
- Full name: Neil David Dewsnip
- Date of birth: 13 August 1961 (age 65)
- Place of birth: Whiston, England

Youth career
- Years: Team
- Liverpool

Managerial career
- 2014–2019: England U18
- 2015: England U17
- 2017: England U20
- 2023–2024: Plymouth Argyle (caretaker)
- 2024: Plymouth Argyle (caretaker)

Neil David Dewsnip (born 13 August 1961) is an English football coach.

Dewsnip had been a youth player at Liverpool and later worked as a teacher at a number of schools before becoming a coach. He worked with Everton's academy for 17 years before beginning work with the England national youth teams in 2013, leaving that role in 2019 to join Plymouth Argyle as director of football, where he had two spells as caretaker manager before leaving in 2025.

== Early and personal life ==
Dewsnip was born in Whiston.

His father Jim worked as a coach at Liverpool under manager Bill Shankly.

== Playing and teaching career ==
Dewsnip was a youth player at Liverpool. His father "realised that he would not make the grade as a professional and so he steered him towards the academic route". Dewsnip trained as a PE teacher, attending the Carnegie College of Physical Education for four years, which later became part of Leeds Beckett University.

He began his teaching career in 1983 at Broad Oak High School in Bury, teaching there for a year-and-a-half. He later taught at New Heys Comprehensive School, where two of his former pupils, Karl Robinson and Jim Bentley, would later become managers in the Football League. He also taught at Cardinal Heenan Catholic High School in Liverpool, and taught future professional footballer Steven Gerrard.

== Coaching career ==
Dewsnip had worked at the Everton Academy for 17 years, coaching future England national football team internationals Wayne Rooney, Ross Barkley, Leon Osman and Jack Rodwell, before leaving in July 2013 to work for the Football Association, initially as the technical lead for the England under-17 to under-21 teams.

He was working as the under-18 team manager by September 2014. Whilst still under-18 manager, he managed the under-17 team at the 2015 FIFA U-17 World Cup following the departure of John Peacock, and he also managed the under-20s in their title winning campaign at the 2017 Toulon Tournament.

In August 2021 Dewsnip was part of Bev Priestman's coaching and mentoring team for the Canada women's team that won Gold at the Tokyo 2020 Olympics.

=== Plymouth Argyle ===
In August 2019 he joined then EFL League Two side Plymouth Argyle as a technical consultant. On 30 November of the same year, Dewsnip was formally appointed as director of football at the club, overseeing the club's entire footballing operations.

In December 2023, with the club in the EFL Championship, Dewsnip, supported by first team coach Kevin Nancekivell, took on caretaker manager duties, following the departure of Steven Schumacher to Stoke City. Dewsnip took charge of four games as caretaker, with three score draws against Birmingham City, Cardiff City and Watford, and a defeat to Southampton. On 5 January 2024 Ian Foster was named as the new head coach at Argyle, and despite Dewsnip setting up the team for the following day's match against Sutton United in the FA Cup, it was Foster who was credited as officially 'managing' the team.

Following Ian Foster's sacking on 1 April 2024, Dewsnip, again supported by Kevin Nancekivell, was re-appointed as caretaker manager until the end of the 2023–24 season. At the time of appointment, Argyle sat just one point above the EFL Championship relegation zone, with six games to play. He left Plymouth in January 2025.
