= List of EFL Championship clubs =

The following is a list of clubs who have played in the English Football League: Championship at any time since its formation in 2004 to the current season.

== Table ==
EFL Championship teams confirmed to be playing in the 2026–27 EFL Championship season are indicated in bold. If the longest spell is the current spell, this is indicated in bold, and if the highest finish is that of the most recent season, this is also in bold. A total of 59 teams have played in the Championship.

All statistics here refer to time in the EFL Championship only, with the exception of 'Most recent finish' which refers to all levels of play, and 'Last promotion' which refers to the club's last promotion from the third tier of English football.

Club	Town or city	Total seasons	Total spells	Longest spell	Promotion to league	Promotion from league	Relegation to league	Relegation from league	Years	Most recent finish	Highest finish
Aston Villa	Birmingham	3	1	3	1971–72	2018–19	2015–16	Never Relegated	2016–2019	4th Premier League	4th
Barnsley	Barnsley	13	3	8	2018–19	Never Promoted	Never Relegated	2021–22	2006–2014; 2016–2018; 2019–2022	15th League One	5th
**Birmingham City**	Birmingham	17	4	13	2024–25	2008–09	2010–11	2023–24	2006–2007; 2008–2009; 2011–2024; **2025–**	10th	2nd
**Blackburn Rovers**	Blackburn	14	2	**9**	2017–18	Never Promoted	2011–12	2016–17	2012–2017; **2018–**	20th	7th
Blackpool	Blackpool	9	3	4	2020–21	2009–10	2010–11	2022–23	2007–2010; 2011–2015; 2021–2023	13th League One	5th
**Bolton Wanderers**	Bolton	7	3	4	2025–26	Never Promoted	2011–12	2018–19	2012–2016; 2017–2019; **2026–**	5th (promoted); League One	7th
Bournemouth	Bournemouth	4	2	2	2012–13	2021–22	2019–20	Never Relegated	2013–2015; 2020–2022	6th Premier League	1st
Brentford	London	7	1	7	2013–14	2020–21	Never Relegated	Never Relegated	2014–2021	9th Premier League	3rd
Brighton & Hove Albion	Brighton	8	2	6	2010–11	2016–17	Never Relegated	2005–06	2004–2006; 2011–2017	8th Premier League	2nd
**Bristol City**	Bristol	18	2	**12**	2014–15	Never Promoted	Never Relegated	2012–13	2007–2013; **2015–**	12th	4th
**Burnley**	Burnley	13	6	5	1993–94	2024–25	2025–26	Never Relegated	2004–2009; 2010–2014; 2015–2016; 2022–2023; 2024–2025; **2026–**	19th (relegated); Premier League	1st
Burton Albion	Burton	2	1	2	2015–16	Never Promoted	Never Relegated	2017–18	2016–2018	17th League One	20th
**Cardiff City**	Cardiff	20	4	9	2025–26	2017–18	2018–19	2024–25	2004–2013; 2014–2018; 2019–2025; **2026–**	2nd (promoted); League One	1st
**Charlton Athletic**	London	9	4	4	2024–25	Never Promoted	2006–07	2019–20	2007–2009; 2012–2016; 2019–2020; **2025–**	19th	9th
Colchester United	Colchester	2	1	2	2005–06	Never Promoted	Never Relegated	2007–08	2006–2008	12th League Two	10th
Coventry City	Coventry	14	2	8	2019–20	2025–26	Never Relegated	2011–12	2004–2012; 2020–2026	1st (promoted)	**1st**
Crewe Alexandra	Crewe	2	1	2	2002–03	Never Promoted	Never Relegated	2005–06	2004–2006	11th League Two	21st
Crystal Palace	London	8	1	8	1978–79	2012–13	2004–05	Never Relegated	2005–2013	15th Premier League	5th
**Derby County**	Derby	20	3	14	2023–24	2006–07	2007–08	2021–22	2004–2007; 2008–2022; **2024–**	8th	3rd
Doncaster Rovers	Doncaster	5	2	4	2012–13	Never Promoted	Never Relegated	2013–14	2008–2012; 2013–2014	14th League One	12th
Fulham	London	6	3	4	1998–99	2021–22	2020–21	Never Relegated	2014–2018; 2019–2020; 2021–2022	11th Premier League	1st
Gillingham	Gillingham	1	1	1	1999–2000	Never Promoted	Never Relegated	2004–05	2004–2005	17th League Two	22nd
Huddersfield Town	Huddersfield	10	2	5	2011–12	2016–17	2018–19	2023–24	2012–2017; 2019–2024	9th League One	3rd
Hull City	Hull	15	5	5	2020–21	2025–26	2016–17	2019–20	2005–2008; 2010–2013; 2015–2016; 2017–2020; 2021–2026	6th (promoted)	2nd
Ipswich Town	Ipswich	17	3	15	2022–23	2025–26	2024–25	2018–19	2004–2019; 2023–2024; 2025–2026	2nd (promoted)	**2nd**
Leeds United	Leeds	15	3	10	2009–10	2024–25	2022–23	2006–07	2004–2007; 2010–2020; 2023–2025	14th Premier League	1st
Leicester City	Leicester	11	4	5	2008–09	2023–24	2024–25	2025–26	2004–2008; 2009–2014; 2023–2024; 2025–2026	23rd (relegated)	1st
**Lincoln City**	Lincoln	1	1	**1**	2025–26	Never Promoted	Never Relegated	Never Relegated	**2026–**	1st (promoted); League One	—N/a
Luton Town	Luton	7	3	4	2018–19	2022–23	2023–24	2024–25	2005–2007; 2019–2023; 2024–2025	7th League One	3rd
**Middlesbrough**	Middlesbrough	17	2	**10**	1986–87	2015–16	2016–17	Never Relegated	2009–2016; **2017–**	5th	2nd
**Millwall**	London	17	3	**10**	2016–17	Never Promoted	Never Relegated	2014–15	2004–2006; 2010–2015; **2017–**	3rd	**3rd**
Milton Keynes Dons	Milton Keynes	1	1	1	2014–15	Never Promoted	Never Relegated	2015–16	2015–2016	2nd (promoted); League Two	23rd
Newcastle United	Newcastle	2	2	1	Never Promoted	2016–17	2015–16	Never Relegated	2009–2010; 2016–2017	12th Premier League	1st
**Norwich City**	Norwich	15	6	**5**	2009–10	2020–21	2021–22	2008–09	2005–2009; 2010–2011; 2014–2015; 2016–2019; 2020–2021; **2022–**	9th	1st
Nottingham Forest	Nottingham	15	2	14	2007–08	2021–22	Never Relegated	2004–05	2004–2005; 2008–2022	16th Premier League	3rd
Oxford United	Oxford	2	1	2	2023–24	Never Promoted	Never Relegated	2025–26	2024–2026	22nd (relegated)	17th
Peterborough United	Peterborough	4	3	2	2020–21	Never Promoted	Never Relegated	2021–22	2009–2010; 2011–2013; 2021–2022	18th League One	18th
Plymouth Argyle	Plymouth	8	2	6	2022–23	Never Promoted	Never Relegated	2024–25	2004–2010; 2023–2025	8th League One	10th
**Portsmouth**	Portsmouth	5	2	**3**	2023–24	Never Promoted	2009–10	2011–12	2010–2012; **2024–**	18th	16th
**Preston North End**	Preston	19	2	**12**	2014–15	Never Promoted	Never Relegated	2010–11	2004–2011; **2015–**	14th	4th
**Queens Park Rangers**	London	20	3	**12**	2003–04	2013–14	2014–15	Never Relegated	2004–2011; 2013–2014; **2015–**	15th	1st
Reading	Reading	16	3	10	2001–02	2011–12	2012–13	2022–23	2004–2006; 2008–2012; 2013–2023	12th League One	1st
Rotherham United	Rotherham	8	5	3	2021–22	Never Promoted	Never Relegated	2023–24	2004–2005; 2014–2017; 2018–2019; 2020–2021; 2022–2024	23rd (relegated); League One	19th
Scunthorpe United	Scunthorpe	3	2	2	2008–09	Never Promoted	Never Relegated	2010–11	2007–2008; 2009–2011	5th National League	20th
**Sheffield United**	Sheffield	13	5	4	2016–17	2022–23	2023–24	2010–11	2004–2006; 2007–2011; 2017–2019; 2021–2023; **2024–**	13th	2nd
Sheffield Wednesday	Sheffield	17	3	9	2022–23	Never Promoted	Never Relegated	2025–26	2005–2010; 2012–2021; 2023–2026	24th (relegated)	4th
**Southampton**	Southampton	8	4	4	2010–11	2023–24	2024–25	2008–09	2005–2009; 2011–2012; 2023–2024; **2025–**	4th	2nd
Southend United	Southend-on-Sea	1	1	1	2005–06	Never Promoted	Never Relegated	2006–07	2006–2007	6th National League	22nd
**Stoke City**	Stoke	13	2	**9**	2001–02	2007–08	2017–18	Never Relegated	2004–2008; **2018–**	17th	2nd
Sunderland	Sunderland	6	4	3	2021–22	2024–25	2016–17	2017–18	2004–2005; 2006–2007; 2017–2018; 2022–2025	7th Premier League	1st
**Swansea City**	Swansea	12	2	**9**	2007–08	2010–11	2017–18	Never Relegated	2008–2011; **2018–**	11th	3rd
**Watford**	Watford	16	4	8	1997–98	2020–21	2021–22	Never Relegated	2004–2006; 2007–2015; 2020–2021; **2022–**	16th	2nd
**West Bromwich Albion**	West Bromwich	11	4	**6**	1992–93	2019–20	2020–21	Never Relegated	2006–2008; 2009–2010; 2018–2020; **2021–**	21st	1st
**West Ham United**	London	3	3	**1**	Never Promoted	2011–12	2025–26	Never Relegated	2004–2005; 2011–2012; **2026–**	18th (relegated); Premier League	3rd
Wigan Athletic	Wigan	7	5	2	2021–22	2004–05	2012–13	2022–23	2004–2005; 2013–2015; 2016–2017; 2018–2020; 2022–2023	16th League One	2nd
**Wolverhampton Wanderers**	Wolverhampton	11	4	5	2013–14	2017–18	2025–26	2012–13	2004–2009; 2012–2013; 2014–2018; **2026–**	20th (relegated); Premier League	1st
**Wrexham**	Wrexham	2	1	**2**	2024–25	Never Promoted	Never Relegated	Never Relegated	**2025–**	7th	**7th**
Wycombe Wanderers	High Wycombe	1	1	1	2019–20	Never Promoted	Never Relegated	2020–21	2020–2021	11th League One	22nd
Yeovil Town	Yeovil	1	1	1	2012–13	Never Promoted	Never Relegated	2013–14	2013–2014	16th National League	24th

== Overview of clubs by season ==
Champions	Runners-up	Promoted via play-offs	Relegated

Club	04 05	05 06	06 07	07 08	08 09	09 10	10 11	11 12	12 13	13 14	14 15	15 16	16 17	17 18	18 19	19 20	20 21	21 22	22 23	23 24	24 25	25 26	26 27
Aston Villa													13	4	5								
Barnsley			20	18	20	18	17	21	21	23			14	22		21	5	24					
Birmingham City			2		2			4	12	21	10	10	19	19	17	20	18	20	17	22		10	
Blackburn Rovers									17	8	9	15	22		15	11	15	8	7	19	7	20	
Blackpool				19	16	6		5	15	20	24							16	23				
Bolton Wanderers									7	14	18	24		21	23								
Bournemouth										10	1						6	2					
Brentford											5	9	10	9	11	3	3						
Brighton & Hove Albion	20	24						10	4	6	20	3	2										
Bristol City				4	10	10	15	20	24			18	17	11	8	12	19	17	14	11	6	12	
Burnley	13	17	15	13	5		8	13	11	2		1							1		2		
Burton Albion													20	23									
Cardiff City	16	11	13	12	7	4	4	6	1		11	8	12	2		5	8	18	21	12	24		
Charlton Athletic				11	24				9	18	12	22				22						19	
Colchester United			10	24																			
Coventry City	19	8	17	21	17	19	18	23									16	12	5	9	5	1	
Crewe Alexandra	21	22																					
Crystal Palace		6	12	5	15	21	20	17	5														
Derby County	4	20	3		18	14	19	12	10	3	8	5	9	6	6	10	21	23			19	8	
Doncaster Rovers					14	12	21	24		22													
Fulham											17	20	6	3		4		1					
Gillingham	22																						
Huddersfield Town									19	17	16	19	5			18	20	3	18	23			
Hull City		18	21	3			11	8	2			4		18	13	24		19	15	7	21	6	
Ipswich Town	3	15	14	8	9	15	13	15	14	9	6	7	16	12	24					2		2	
Leeds United	14	5	24				7	14	13	15	15	13	7	13	3	1				3	1		
Leicester City	15	16	19	22		5	10	9	6	1										1		23	
Lincoln City																							
Luton Town		10	23													19	12	6	3		22		
Middlesbrough						11	12	7	16	12	4	2		5	7	17	10	7	4	8	10	5	
Millwall	10	23					9	16	20	19	22			8	21	8	11	9	8	13	8	3	
Milton Keynes Dons												23											
Newcastle United						1							1										
Norwich City		9	16	17	22		2				3		8	14	1		1		13	6	13	9	
Nottingham Forest	23				19	3	6	19	8	11	14	16	21	17	9	7	17	4					
Oxford United																					17	22	
Peterborough United						24		18	22									22					
Plymouth Argyle	17	14	11	10	21	23														21	23		
Portsmouth							16	22													16	18	
Preston North End	5	4	7	15	6	17	22					11	11	7	14	9	13	13	12	10	20	14	
Queens Park Rangers	11	21	18	14	11	13	1			4		12	18	16	19	13	9	11	20	18	15	15	
Reading	7	1			4	9	5	1		7	19	17	3	20	20	14	7	21	22				
Rotherham United	24										21	21	24		22		23		19	24			
Scunthorpe United				23		20	24																
Sheffield United	8	2		9	3	8	23							10	2			5	2		3	13	
Sheffield Wednesday		19	9	16	12	22			18	16	13	6	4	15	12	16	24			20	12	24	
Southampton		12	6	20	23			2												4		4	
Southend United			22																				
Stoke City	12	13	8	2											16	15	14	14	16	17	18	17	
Sunderland	1		1											24					6	16	4		
Swansea City					8	7	3								10	6	4	15	10	14	11	11	
Watford	18	3		6	13	16	14	11	3	13	2						2		11	15	14	16	
West Bromwich Albion			4	1		2									4	2		10	9	5	9	21	
West Ham United	6							3															
Wigan Athletic	2									5	23		23		18	23			24				
Wolverhampton Wanderers	9	7	5	7	1				23		7	14	15	1									
Wrexham																						7	
Wycombe Wanderers																	22						
Yeovil Town										24													
Club	04 05	05 06	06 07	07 08	08 09	09 10	10 11	11 12	12 13	13 14	14 15	15 16	16 17	17 18	18 19	19 20	20 21	21 22	22 23	23 24	24 25	25 26	26 27

== See also ==
- List of Premier League clubs
