= Ian Foster (footballer) =

English footballer (born 1976)

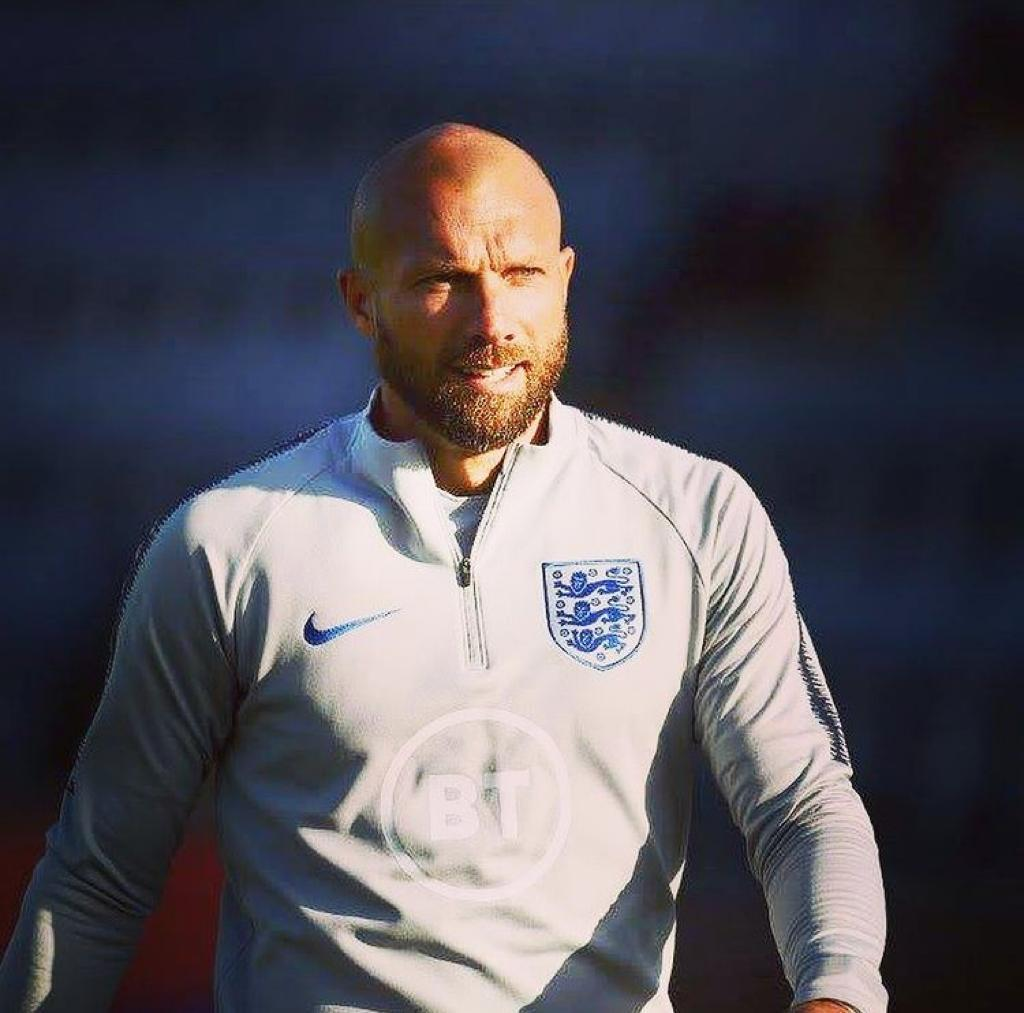

Personal information
- Full name: James Ian Foster
- Date of birth: 11 November 1976 (age 49)
- Place of birth: Whiston, Merseyside, England
- Height: 5 ft 6 in (1.68 m)
- Position: Striker

Team information
- Current team: Jeddah (manager)

Youth career
- Liverpool

Senior career*
Years	Team	Apps	(Gls)
1996–1999	Hereford United	44	(3)
1999–2000	Barrow	28	(7)
2000–2003	Kidderminster Harriers	123	(28)
2003–2004	Chester City	21	(2)
2004–2005	Kidderminster Harriers	41	(9)
2008	Galway United	1	(0)
Total		258	(49)

Managerial career
- 2009: Galway United
- 2009–2011: Dundalk
- 2019–2020: England U18
- 2020–2022: England U19
- 2022–2023: England U20
- 2024: Plymouth Argyle
- 2026–: Jeddah
- * Club domestic league appearances and goals

James Ian Foster (born 11 November 1976) is an English football coach and former professional player, he is the current manager of Saudi First Division League club Jeddah.

== Playing career ==
Foster began his career at the Liverpool FC Academy working under the tutelage of Steve Heighway and Sammy Lee. He spent the majority of his playing career in the lower leagues of English football, enjoying success at clubs such as Hereford United, Chester City and Kidderminster Harriers in League Two and the National League.

== Coaching career ==
=== Galway United ===
Foster joined League of Ireland Premier Division club Galway United in May 2008 as assistant manager to Jeff Kenna. The duo were tasked with retention of the club's Premier Division status, which they duly achieved. Upon Kenna's departure to Saint Patrick's Athletic in January 2009, Foster was appointed manager of the club and led the club once again to Premier Division safety in the 2009 season.

=== Dundalk ===
Following the successful stint at Galway United, Foster was appointed manager of newly promoted Dundalk in December 2009. In his first season in charge, he led the Lilywhites to safety and also to their first Europa League campaign since the 2002–03 season. He remained in post for the 2011 season and again secured Premier Division status for the club whilst also guiding Dundalk to the All Ireland (Setanta) Cup final.

During his time in Ireland, Foster completed a number of coaching qualifications, including the UEFA Pro Licence. As part of the 2011 English FA cohort, he graduated alongside alumni including Ole Gunnar Solskjær and Gianfranco Zola

=== Coventry City ===
Citing family circumstances, Foster returned to England to resume his coaching career. In August 2012, he took on a wide-ranging role at Coventry City working initially with the U18 and then U21 squads. Upon the departure of manager Mark Robins to Huddersfield Town in February 2013, Foster was appointed First Team Coach, initially working alongside Lee Carsley and subsequently Steven Pressley. During his tenure at the club he oversaw the development of a number of players who went on to earn full international honours, including James Maddison, Callum Wilson, John Fleck and Cyrus Christie.

=== Portsmouth ===
In May 2015, Foster was appointed by manager Paul Cook as first team coach at then-League Two Portsmouth. In the season prior to Cook's arrival, the club had finished in 16th in the league, with the new coaching team guiding the club to a play-off position (sixth) in the 2015–16 season. The following season saw Foster play an instrumental role in the title-winning 2016–17 season. Foster left the club in February 2017 to take up a position with the FA.

=== England youth ===
Foster was appointed to the role of National Specialist (Out of Possession) Coach to the England Men's U17 Football Team in February 2017. Working with Steve Cooper and Mike Marsh, the age group embarked on arguably the most successful period in its history. In May 2017, the team qualified for the UEFA Men's U17 European Championships, held in Croatia. They lost the final on penalties to Spain, before gaining revenge in the FIFA Men's U17 World Cup in India, winning the trophy by beating the same opponents in the final 5–2.

May 2018 saw the U17s once again qualify for the European Championships in England, losing in the semi-final on penalties to eventual winners the Netherlands.

The U17s again qualified for the European Championships in 2019 in Ireland, reaching the group stages.

In August 2019, Foster was named as Head Coach of England Men's U18s. Despite a heavily disrupted season due to the COVID-19 pandemic, his first season in charge was a successful one, with a record of 7 wins and 2 draws from 9 games played during international breaks.

Foster subsequently moved up to become Head Coach of England Men's U19s in September 2020. November 2021 saw the team qualify for the Elite Round of the 2022 Under-19 European Championship, topping their qualification group. They went on to win their 3 Elite Round games in March 2022, thus qualifying for the finals in Slovakia in June 2022, and were the only team to qualify from the Elite Round with a 100% win rate. They further boasted the best defensive record in the competition, conceding only one goal in their six qualification matches.

England U19s went on to win to 2022 edition of the U19 European Championships, beating Israel (3–1 AET) in the final at the Anton Malatinský Stadium in Trnava, Slovakia. By virtue of their performance in the tournament, they qualified for the 2023 FIFA U-20 World Cup, due to be held in Indonesia in May–June 2023.

During his time within the England Men's coaching set-up, Foster has played a role in the development of a number of players who have achieved full international status, including Phil Foden, Bukayo Saka, Jadon Sancho, Callum Hudson-Odoi, Mason Greenwood, Conor Gallagher, Emile Smith Rowe and Yunus Musah.

On 16 August 2022, it was confirmed that Foster would take charge of the England U20s ahead of the 2023 FIFA U-20 World Cup.

=== England women ===
Foster also held the role of England senior women's assistant coach, working alongside head coach Phil Neville.

=== Al-Ettifaq ===
On 10 July 2023, Foster left the FA to link up with Steven Gerrard at Saudi Professional League club Al-Ettifaq.

=== Plymouth Argyle ===
On 5 January 2024, Foster was appointed head coach of Championship club Plymouth Argyle. He was relieved of his duties on 1 April 2024 after 1 win in 12 games including a run of 5 straight home defeats without scoring.

== Managerial statistics ==
As of match played 1 April 2024

Managerial record by team and tenure
Team	From	To	Record				
Team	From	To	P	W	D	L	Win %
Galway United	14 January 2009	4 December 2009	41	14	7	20	34.15
Dundalk	5 December 2009	31 December 2011	95	35	23	37	36.84
England U18	1 August 2019	23 September 2020	9	7	2	0	77.78
England U19	24 September 2020	15 August 2022	16	12	2	2	75.00
England U20	16 August 2022	10 July 2023	10	7	2	1	70.00
Plymouth Argyle	5 January 2024	1 April 2024	16	3	4	9	18.75
Total			188	79	40	69	42.02

== Honours ==
As a player

Kidderminster Harriers

- Conference National: 1999–2000

Chester City

- Conference National: 2003–04

As a manager

England U19

- UEFA U19 European Championship: 2022
